= Iker Lecuona =

Spanish motorcycle racer (born 2000)

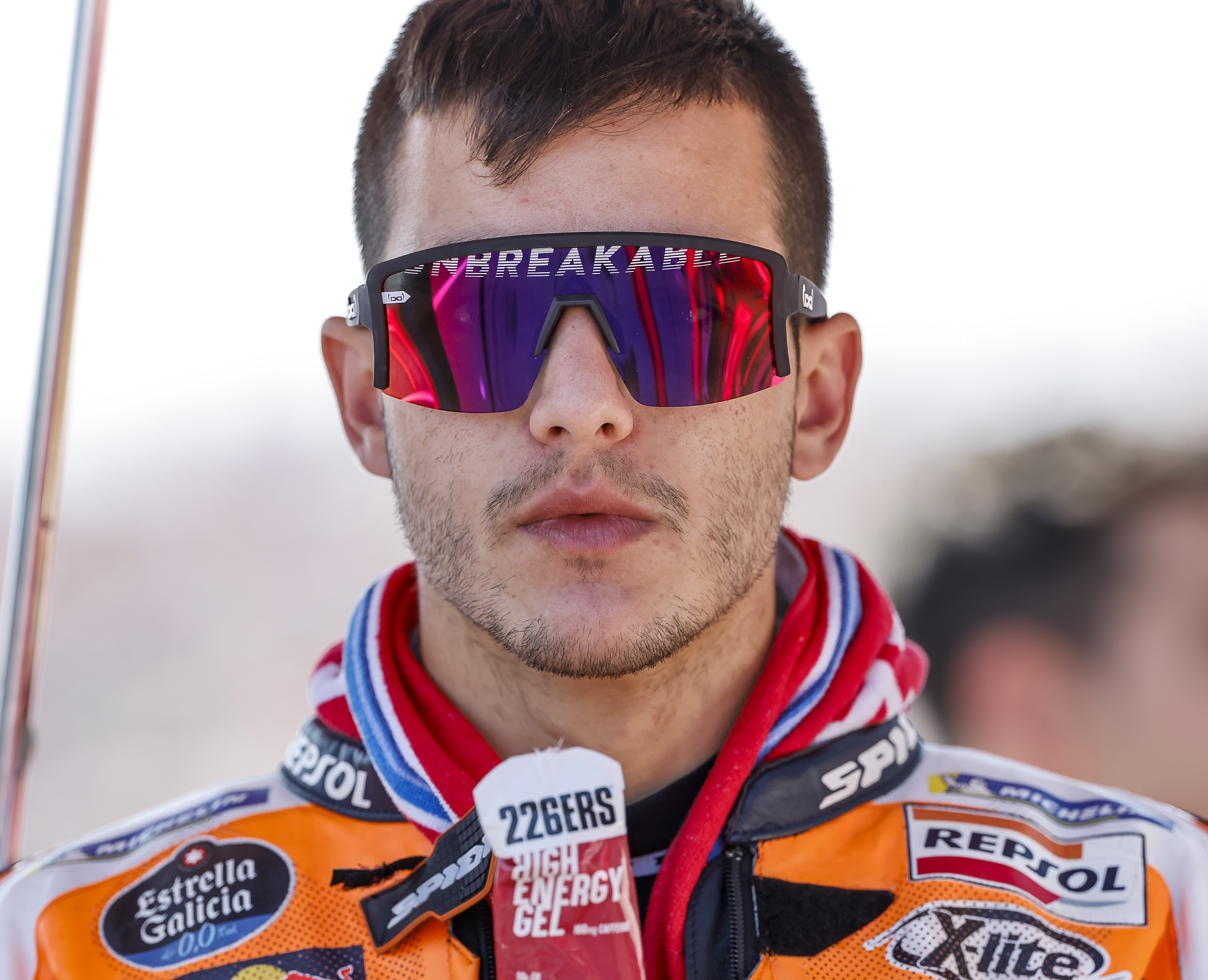
- Lecuona at the 2023 Dutch TT
- Nationality: Spanish
- Born: 6 January 2000 (age 26); Valencia, Spain
- Current team: Aruba.it Racing – Ducati
- Bike number: 7
- Website: ikerlecuona.com
Motorcycle racing career statistics
MotoGP World Championship
Active years	2019–2021, 2023, 2026
Manufacturers	KTM (2019–2021); Honda (2023); Ducati (2026)
Championships	0
2023 championship position	30th (0 pts)
Starts / Wins / Podiums / Poles / F. laps / Points; 41 / 0 / 0 / 0 / 0 / 84
Moto2 World Championship
Active years	2016–2019
Manufacturers	Kalex (2016–2017); KTM (2018–2019)
Championships	0
2019 championship position	12th (90 pts)
Starts / Wins / Podiums / Poles / F. laps / Points; 55 / 0 / 2 / 0 / 0 / 172
Superbike World Championship
Active years	2022–
Manufacturers	Honda (2022–2025); Ducati (2026–)
Championships	0
2026 championship position	2nd (563 pts)
Starts / Wins / Podiums / Poles / F. laps / Points; 155 / 4 / 34 / 2 / 4 / 1132

Iker Lecuona Gascón (born 6 January 2000) is a Spanish motorcycle racer, competing in the Superbike World Championship for the Aruba.it Racing – Ducati team. He finished as championship runner-up in the 2026 season. He previously raced for Honda Racing Corporation, on a CBR1000RR-R from 2022 to 2025. He spent two seasons in MotoGP, from 2020 to 2021 with KTM Tech3.

== Career ==
=== Moto2 World Championship ===
==== CarXpert Interwetten/Technomag Racing Interwetten (2016) ====
In 2016, Lecuona made his debut in the Moto2 World Championship replacing the injured Dominique Aegerter in the CarXpert Interwetten team for two races; later in the season he rejoined the team as the permanent replacement for the same rider.

==== Garage Plus Interwetten (2017) ====
Lecuona suffered serious back and collarbone injuries in a crash during pre-season testing at Jerez and missed the first two races of the 2017 season. That season, Lecuona managed his first point-scoring race at world championship level in the second to last race in Malaysia. He finished 35th in the standings in this rookie Moto2 season.

==== Swiss Innovative Investors (2018) ====
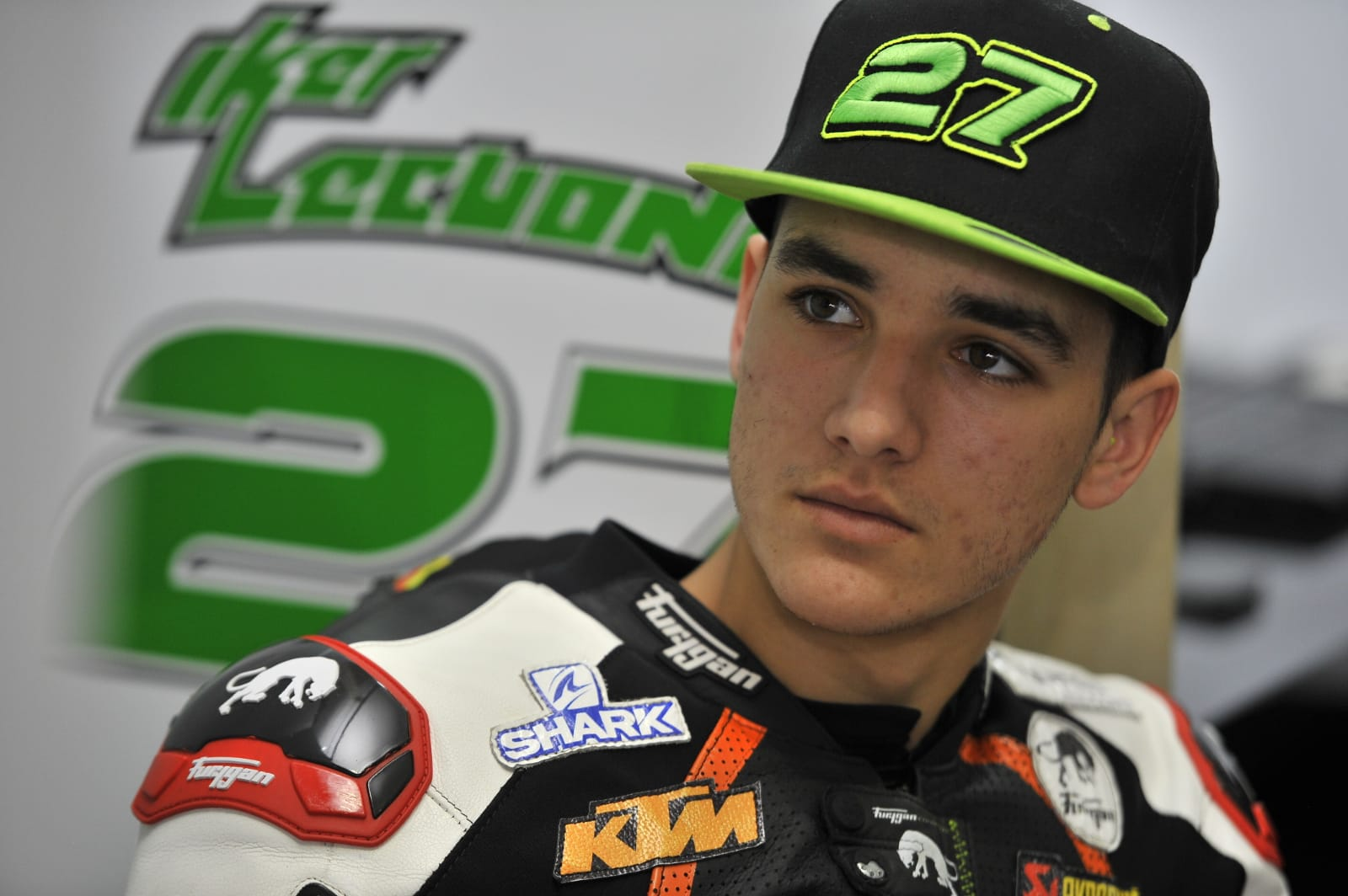
Lecuona at the 2018 Australian Grand Prix

In the final race of the season, at Valencia, Lecuona achieved his first world championship podium, finishing second after fellow KTM rider Miguel Oliveira. A further ten finishes in the point scoring ranks, six of which being top-ten finishes resulted in Lecuona placing 12th in the championship standings.

==== American Racing (2019) ====
2019 saw Lecuona achieve a second podium finish on world championship level. At the 2019 Thailand Grand Prix, Lecuona finished third after fellow KTM rider Brad Binder and Luca Marini.

=== MotoGP World Championship ===
==== Tech3 (2019–2021) ====
Lecuona's first MotoGP outing happened during the 2019 season, after having been announced as a regular rider for the following season with Tech3. In the season finale at Valencia, he replaced Tech3 KTM rider Miguel Oliveira who could not participate after undergoing surgery. Lecuona did not finish the race after crashing and retiring on lap 13 of 27.

Lecuona was signed by Tech3 KTM for the 2020 season, after the surprise departure of Johann Zarco from the KTM Factory Team. Following Zarco's announcement, Brad Binder who was set to join Tech3, was promoted to the factory team, leaving the position at the satellite team next to Miguel Oliveira vacant.

In 2020, Lecuona scored points in seven races, three times finishing in the top-ten (ninth in Aragón and Austria, and tenth in Styria). He was forced to sit out of the European Grand Prix in Valencia, due to Andorran quarantine rules for close contact with individuals who tested positive for COVID-19. His brother – with whom he lived in Andorra – and his personal assistant both tested positive for the virus on 3 November, meaning Lecuona was forced into a mandatory quarantine of ten days minimum. Tech3 elected not to replace him on such short notice. Lecuona also missed the Valencian Grand Prix after he subsequently tested positive for the virus shortly before the beginning of the race weekend, and subsequently the Portuguese Grand Prix on the following weekend. KTM test rider Mika Kallio replaced Lecuona in Portugal.

In 2021, Lecuona remained with Tech3, as per their contract, which would expire at the end of the season. Since his teammate Miguel Oliveira was signed with the KTM Factory Racing Team, former Ducati factory rider Danilo Petrucci was signed to partner Lecuona on a one-year contract. However, both Tech3 teammates were left without a ride for the 2022 season after Red Bull KTM Ajo teammates Remy Gardner and Raúl Fernández showed a dominant performance in the Moto2 World Championship, subsequently both being signed by Tech3 for the 2022 season.

=== Superbike World Championship ===
Following losing his seat in MotoGP, Lecuona secured a deal to join Honda's factory Superbike for the 2022, replacing the departing Álvaro Bautista.

For 2026, Lecuona joined the Aruba.it Racing – Ducati team, replacing Álvaro Bautista. He finished his first season with the Factory Ducati Team in second place in the championship. He won four races, including his first hat-trick of the season at the Italian Round, and finished second on 27 occasions, battling it out with Nicolò Bulega. This was his best result in the Superbike World Championship.

=== Return to MotoGP ===
==== Repsol Honda Team (2023) ====
Lecuona was selected to replace Marc Márquez at the Spanish Grand Prix and Joan Mir at the Dutch TT in the Repsol Honda Team.

==== LCR Honda Castrol (2023) ====
Lecuona was selected to replace Álex Rins at the British, Austrian, Catalan, Malaysian, and Qatar Grand Prix in the LCR Honda Castrol team.

==== BK8 Gresini Racing MotoGP (2026) ====
Lecuona was selected to replace Álex Márquez at the Hungarian and Qatar Grand Prix, as well as Fermín Aldeguer at the British, Australian, and Malaysian Grand Prix in the BK8 Gresini Racing MotoGP team.

==== Ducati Lenovo Team (2026) ====
Lecuona was selected to replace Francesco Bagnaia at the Portuguese Grand Prix in the Ducati Lenovo Team.

=== Suzuka 8 Hours ===
In 2025, Lecuona was scheduled to compete in the Suzuka 8 Hours race. However, he was forced to miss this event after suffering injuries in a multi-rider accident at the Hungarian Superbike race.

== Career statistics ==
=== FIM CEV Moto2 European Championship ===
==== Races by year ====
(key) (Races in bold indicate pole position, races in italics indicate fastest lap)

Year	Bike	1	2	3	4	5	6	7	8	9	10	11	Pos	Pts
2015	Suter	ALG1	ALG2	CAT	ARA1	ARA2	ALB	NAV1; 9	NAV2; 8	JER	VAL1; Ret	VAL2; 11	18th	20
2016	Kalex	VAL1	VAL2	ARA1; 7	ARA2; 7	CAT1; 5	CAT2; 6	ALB; 5	ALG1; 7	ALG2; 5	JER; 7	VAL; 16	6th	79

=== Grand Prix motorcycle racing ===
==== By season ====
Season	Class	Motorcycle	Team	Race	Win	Podium	Pole	FLap	Pts	Plcd
2016	Moto2	Kalex	CarXpert Interwetten	6	0	0	0	0	0	36th
2017	Moto2	Kalex	Garage Plus Interwetten	13	0	0	0	0	2	35th
2018	Moto2	KTM	Swiss Innovative Investors	18	0	1	0	0	80	12th
2019	Moto2	KTM	American Racing	18	0	1	0	0	90	12th
2019	MotoGP	KTM	Red Bull KTM Tech3	1	0	0	0	0	0	NC
2020	MotoGP	KTM	Red Bull KTM Tech3	11	0	0	0	0	27	20th
2021	MotoGP	KTM	Tech3 KTM Factory Racing	18	0	0	0	0	39	20th
2023	MotoGP	Honda	Repsol Honda Team	2	0	0	0	0	0	30th
2023	MotoGP	Honda	LCR Honda Castrol	5	0	0	0	0	0	30th
2026	MotoGP	Ducati	BK8 Gresini Racing MotoGP	4	0	0	0	0	18*	21st*
2026	MotoGP	Ducati	Ducati Lenovo Team	0	0	0	0	0	18*	21st*
Total				**96**	**0**	**2**	**0**	**0**	**256**	

==== By class ====
Class	Seasons	1st GP	1st pod	1st win	Race	Win	Podiums	Pole	FLap	Pts	WChmp
Moto2	2016–2019	2016 Great Britain	2018 Valencia		55	0	2	0	0	172	0
MotoGP	2019–2021, 2023, 2026	2019 Valencia			41	0	0	0	0	84	0
Total	2016–2021, 2023, 2026				**96**	**0**	**2**	**0**	**0**	**256**	**0**

==== Races by year ====
(key) (Races in bold indicate pole position, races in italics indicate fastest lap)

Year	Class	Bike	1	2	3	4	5	6	7	8	9	10	11	12	13	14	15	16	17	18	19	20	21	22	Pos	Pts
2016	Moto2	Kalex	QAT	ARG	AME	SPA	FRA	ITA	CAT	NED	GER	AUT	CZE	GBR; 19	RSM; 21	ARA	JPN; Ret	AUS; Ret	MAL; 22	VAL; 24					36th	0
2017	Moto2	Kalex	QAT	ARG	AME; DNS	SPA; Ret	FRA; DNS	ITA	CAT; 24	NED; 23	GER; 21	CZE; 19	AUT; 21	GBR; Ret	RSM; Ret	ARA; 21	JPN; 17	AUS; 20	MAL; 14	VAL; 18					35th	2
2018	Moto2	KTM	QAT; Ret	ARG; 11	AME; 5	SPA; 9	FRA; Ret	ITA; 13	CAT; 10	NED; 16	GER; 19	CZE; 13	AUT; 10	GBR; C	RSM; 19	ARA; 14	THA; 7	JPN; 8	AUS; Ret	MAL; Ret	VAL; 2				12th	80
2019	Moto2	KTM	QAT; Ret	ARG; 4	AME; Ret	SPA; 10	FRA; 9	ITA; Ret	CAT; Ret	NED; 15	GER; Ret	CZE; 10	AUT; 8	GBR; 11	RSM; 21	ARA; 7	THA; 3	JPN; Ret	AUS; 7	MAL; 6					12th	90
2019	MotoGP	KTM																			VAL; Ret				NC	0
2020	MotoGP	KTM	SPA; Ret	ANC; Ret	CZE; Ret	AUT; 9	STY; 10	RSM; 14	EMI; Ret	CAT; 14	FRA; 15	ARA; 14	TER; 9	EUR	VAL; WD	POR									20th	27
2021	MotoGP	KTM	QAT; 17	DOH; Ret	POR; 15	SPA; 17	FRA; 9	ITA; 11	CAT; Ret	GER; 17	NED; Ret	STY; 15	AUT; 6	GBR; 7	ARA; 11	RSM; Ret	AME; 16	EMI; Ret	ALR; Ret	VAL; 15					20th	39
2023	MotoGP	Honda	POR	ARG	AME	SPA; 16	FRA	ITA	GER	NED; Ret	GBR; 17	AUT; 20	CAT; 16	RSM	IND	JPN	INA	AUS	THA	MAL; 16	QAT; Ret	VAL			30th	0
2026	MotoGP	Ducati	THA	BRA	USA	SPA	FRA	CAT	ITA	HUN; 7	CZE	NED	GER	GBR; Ret	ARA	RSM	AUT	JPN	INA	AUS; C^{9}	MAL; 15	QAT; 10^{9}	POR	VAL	21st*	18*

=== Superbike World Championship ===
==== By season ====
Season	Motorcycle	Team	Race	Win	Podium	Pole	FLap	Pts	Plcd
2022	Honda CBR1000RR-R	Team HRC	30	0	1	1	0	189	9th
2023	Honda CBR1000RR-R	Team HRC	35	0	0	0	0	143	13th
2024	Honda CBR1000RR-R	Team HRC	29	0	1	0	0	134	12th
2025	Honda CBR1000RR-R	Honda HRC	25	0	0	0	0	103	13th
2026	Ducati Panigale V4R	Aruba.it Racing – Ducati	36	4	32	1	4	563	**2nd**
Total			**155**	**4**	**34**	**2**	**4**	**1132**	

==== Races by year ====
(key) (Races in bold indicate pole position) (Races in italics indicate fastest lap)

Year	Bike	1			2			3			4			5			6			7			8			9			10			11			12			Pos	Pts
Year	Bike	R1	SR	R2	R1	SR	R2	R1	SR	R2	R1	SR	R2	R1	SR	R2	R1	SR	R2	R1	SR	R2	R1	SR	R2	R1	SR	R2	R1	SR	R2	R1	SR	R2	R1	SR	R2	Pos	Pts
2022	Honda	SPA; 6	SPA; 8	SPA; 10	NED; 5	NED; 5	NED; 3	POR; 6	POR; 4	POR; 6	ITA; 9	ITA; 5	ITA; 5	GBR; 8	GBR; 7	GBR; 10	CZE; 8	CZE; 7	CZE; Ret	FRA; 9	FRA; 11	FRA; 10	**SPA**; 6	**SPA**; Ret	SPA; 8	POR; 11	POR; 12	POR; 22	ARG; 4	ARG; 6	ARG; 7	INA; DNS	INA; DNS	INA; DNS	AUS	AUS	AUS	9th	189
2023	Honda	AUS; 6	AUS; 8	AUS; 6	INA; 12	INA; 16	INA; 9	NED; Ret	NED; 11	NED; Ret	SPA; 6	SPA; 4	SPA; 9	ITA; 8	ITA; NC	ITA; DNS	GBR; Ret	GBR; 13	GBR; 14	ITA; Ret	ITA; 13	ITA; 10	CZE; 5	CZE; 10	CZE; 12	FRA; 14	FRA; 12	FRA; 11	SPA; 10	SPA; 6	SPA; 6	POR; 8	POR; 5	POR; 7	SPA; 9	SPA; 13	SPA; 16	13th	143
2024	Honda	AUS; DNS	AUS; WD	AUS; WD	SPA; 13	SPA; 21	SPA; Ret	NED; WD	NED; WD	NED; WD	ITA; 10	ITA; 7	ITA; 9	GBR; 13	GBR; 17	GBR; 14	CZE; Ret	CZE; 14	CZE; 10	POR; 12	POR; 14	POR; 13	FRA; 6	FRA; 7	FRA; 10	ITA; 4	ITA; 5	ITA; 6	SPA; 6	SPA; 7	SPA; 8	POR; 3	POR; 8	POR; Ret	SPA; 5	SPA; Ret	SPA; DNS	12th	134
2025	Honda	AUS; DNS	AUS; DNS	AUS; DNS	POR; 11	POR; 9	POR; 8	NED; 5	NED; 14	NED; 7	ITA; Ret	ITA; Ret	ITA; 6	CZE; 7	CZE; 6	CZE; 7	EMI; 9	EMI; 9	EMI; 6	GBR; Ret	GBR; Ret	GBR; 10	HUN; Ret	HUN; DNS	HUN; DNS	FRA	FRA	FRA	ARA	ARA	ARA	POR; Ret	POR; 10	POR; Ret	SPA; 12	SPA; 8	SPA; 9	13th	103
2026	Ducati	AUS; 6	AUS; 9	AUS; 8	POR; 2	POR; 2	POR; 2	NED; 2	NED; 2	NED; 2	HUN; 2	HUN; 2	HUN; 2	CZE; 2	CZE; 2	CZE; 2	ARA; 2	ARA; 2	ARA; 2	EMI; 2	EMI; 2	EMI; 2	GBR; 1	GBR; Ret	GBR; 2	FRA; 2	FRA; 2	FRA; 2	**ITA**; 1	**ITA**; 1	ITA; 1	POR; 2	POR; 2	POR; 2	SPA; 3	SPA; 2	SPA; 2	2nd	563

== Records ==
As of 18 October 2026, Lecuona holds the following records:

WorldSBK

- Most consecutive second-place finishes: 18 (Race 1 2026 Portuguese Round–Race 2 2026 Emilia-Romagna Round)
- Most consecutive second-place finishes in a single season: 18 (Race 1 2026 Portuguese Round–Race 2 2026 Emilia-Romagna Round)
- Most second-place finishes in a single season: 27

== Suzuka 8 Hours results ==
Year	Team	Riders	Bike	Pos
2022	(Japan) Honda Team HRC	(Japan) Tetsuta Nagashima (Japan) Takumi Takahashi	Honda CBR1000RR-R SP	1st
