= 2020 European motorcycle Grand Prix =

(Europe) 2020 European Grand Prix
Race details
- Race 13 of 15 races in the 2020 Grand Prix motorcycle racing season
- Date: 8 November 2020
- Official name: Gran Premio de Europa
- Location: Circuit Ricardo Tormo; Cheste, Valencia, Spain
- Course: Permanent racing facility; 4.005 km (2.489 mi)

MotoGP
Pole position
Rider	(Spain) Pol Espargaró	KTM
Time	1:40.434	
Fastest lap
Rider	(South Africa) Brad Binder	KTM
Time	1:31.884 on lap 22	
Podium
First	(Spain) Joan Mir	Suzuki
Second	(Spain) Álex Rins	Suzuki
Third	(Spain) Pol Espargaró	KTM

Moto2
Pole position
Rider	(Spain) Xavi Vierge	Kalex
Time	1:38.936	
Fastest lap
Rider	(Spain) Héctor Garzó	Kalex
Time	1:35.584 on lap 4	
Podium
First	(Italy) Marco Bezzecchi	Kalex
Second	(Spain) Jorge Martín	Kalex
Third	(Australia) Remy Gardner	Kalex

Moto3
Pole position
Rider	(United Kingdom) John McPhee	Honda
Time	1:52.252	
Fastest lap
Rider	(Spain) Albert Arenas	KTM
Time	1:39.030 on lap 7	
Podium
First	(Spain) Raúl Fernández	KTM
Second	(Spain) Sergio García	Honda
Third	(Japan) Ai Ogura	Honda

The 2020 European motorcycle Grand Prix (officially known as the Gran Premio de Europa) was the thirteenth round of the 2020 Grand Prix motorcycle racing season and the twelfth round of the 2020 MotoGP World Championship. It was held at the Circuit Ricardo Tormo in Cheste on 8 November 2020.

== Background ==
=== Impact of the COVID-19 pandemic ===
The opening rounds of the 2020 championship have been heavily affected by the COVID-19 pandemic. Several Grands Prix were cancelled or postponed after the aborted opening round in Qatar, prompting the Fédération Internationale de Motocyclisme to draft a new calendar. A new calendar based exclusively in Europe was announced on 11 June. The organizers of the Valencian Community Grand Prix have signed a contract with Dorna Sports, owner of the commercial rights of the sport, to host a double stage at Circuit Ricardo Tormo, becoming the fifth circuit to host two consecutive races of the World Championship, and is the third time it takes place in Spain. But unlike the other double events of the season, the original Grand Prix will be preceded by the round introduced by the new calendar. The name chosen is that of the European Grand Prix, which returns to the world championship for the first time since 1995.

=== MotoGP Championship standings before the race ===
After the eleventh round at the Teruel Grand Prix, Joan Mir leads the drivers' standings with 137 points, 14 more than Fabio Quartararo and 19 more than Maverick Viñales. Franco Morbidelli, after the victory in the Teruel stage, gains two positions and is fourth with 112 points and has three points against Andrea Dovizioso, now fifth.

In the constructors' classification, following the 50-point penalty imposed on Yamaha for failing to comply with the protocol that requires unanimous approval from the Motorcycle Sport Manufacturers Association (MSMA) for technical modifications (Yamaha would have changed valve specifications between the freezing of the homologation just before the abandoned round in Qatar and the opening round at Jerez), Ducati is the new leader with 171 points, followed by Suzuki at 163 points and Yamaha, which has lost the championship lead and now third at 158 points. Honda and KTM are fourth and fifth respectively at 143 and 117 points, while Aprilia closes the standings with 36 points.

In the team standings, Team Suzuki Ecstar leads with 242 points. Petronas Yamaha SRT and Monster Energy Yamaha, following the penalties of 37 and 20 points for technical modifications on their bikes, are respectively second (with 198 points) and fifth (with 156 points), the latter relegated by one position and overtaken by KTM Factory Racing by only one point. Ducati Team is third with 180 points.

=== MotoGP Entrants ===
- Stefan Bradl replaced Marc Márquez for the tenth straight race while the latter recovered from injuries sustained in his opening round crash.
- Aprilia test rider and former World Superbike rider Lorenzo Savadori has been announced to replace Bradley Smith for the final three rounds in Valencia and Portugal, subsequently excluding Andrea Iannone from a start in 2020.
- Iker Lecuona is forced to miss the European Grand Prix due to Andorran quarantine rules, after his brother and assistant both tested positive for the SARS-CoV-2 virus. Tech3 elected not to replace him on such short notice.
- After delays to Valentino Rossi's SARS-CoV-2 recovery, Yamaha World Superbike rider Garrett Gerloff was announced initially to replace Rossi at the European Grand Prix. Gerloff completed the Friday sessions of free practice, before two subsequent negative tests from Rossi allowed him to return to the paddock beginning with the third practice session on Saturday.

== Free practice ==
=== MotoGP ===
The first session, held in wet conditions, Jack Miller was the fastest ahead of Franco Morbidelli and Stefan Bradl. In the second session, on a dry track, Miller confirmed his leadership in the standings ahead of Aleix Espargaró and Morbidelli. The third session, held in wet conditions, Johann Zarco set the best time ahead of Maverick Viñales and Takaaki Nakagami.

=== Combined Free Practice 1-2-3 ===
The top ten riders (written in bold) qualified in Q2.

Pos.	No.	Bikers	Constructor	Free practice times		
Pos.	No.	Bikers	Constructor	FP1	FP2	FP3
1	43	(Australia) **Jack Miller**	**Ducati**	1:42.063	**1:32.528**	No time
2	41	(Spain) **Aleix Espargaró**	**Aprilia**	1:43.461	**1:32.620**	1:42.957
3	21	(Italy) **Franco Morbidelli**	**Yamaha**	1:42.530	**1:32.804**	1:42.831
4	30	(Japan) **Takaaki Nakagami**	**Honda**	1:43.230	**1:32.866**	1:41.071
5	44	(Spain) **Pol Espargaró**	**KTM**	1:42.841	**1:32.952**	1:42.506
6	42	(Spain) **Álex Rins**	**Suzuki**	1:43.521	**1:33.157**	1:41.779
7	33	(South Africa) **Brad Binder**	**KTM**	1:42.584	**1:33.259**	1:43.534
8	4	(Italy) **Andrea Dovizioso**	**Ducati**	1:42.959	**1:33.292**	1:42.009
9	20	(France) **Fabio Quartararo**	**Yamaha**	1:44.791	**1:33.337**	1:43.234
10	36	(Spain) **Joan Mir**	**Suzuki**	1:43.728	**1:33.405**	1:41.864
11	12	(Spain) Maverick Viñales	Yamaha	1:43.009	**1:33.410**	1:40.743
12	35	(United Kingdom) Cal Crutchlow	Honda	1:43.925	**1:33.463**	1:41.285
13	88	(Portugal) Miguel Oliveira	KTM	1:42.877	**1:33.483**	1:41.352
14	6	(Germany) Stefan Bradl	Honda	1:42.566	**1:33.504**	1:41.884
15	63	(Italy) Francesco Bagnaia	Ducati	1:43.572	**1:33.515**	1:41.193
16	73	(Spain) Álex Márquez	Honda	1:42.654	**1:33.570**	1:41.589
17	5	(France) Johann Zarco	Ducati	1:42.639	**1:33.739**	1:40.007
18	9	(Italy) Danilo Petrucci	Ducati	1:42.700	**1:33.775**	1:42.824
19	32	(Italy) Lorenzo Savadori	Aprilia	1:44.527	**1:35.661**	1:42.301
20	53	(Spain) Tito Rabat	Ducati	1:44.448	**1:36.690**	1:42.547
21	46	(Italy) Valentino Rossi	Yamaha	No time	No time	**1:41.642**
OFFICIAL MOTOGP COMBINED FREE PRACTICE TIMES REPORT

Fastest session lap

Personal Best lap

Notes

- Garrett Gerloff participated in the first two sessions having been initially chosen by Yamaha as a replacement for Valentino Rossi (his best times were in FP1 1:43.645, in FP2 1:34.107).

In the fourth session Miguel Oliveira was the fastest ahead of Joan Mir and Miller.

== Qualifying ==
=== MotoGP ===
Pos.	No.	Biker	Constructor	Qualifying times		Final grid	Row
Pos.	No.	Biker	Constructor	Q1	Q2	Final grid	Row
1	44	(Spain) Pol Espargaró	KTM	Qualified in Q2	1:40.434	1	1
2	42	(Spain) Álex Rins	Suzuki	Qualified in Q2	1:40.475	2	1
3	30	(Japan) Takaaki Nakagami	Honda	Qualified in Q2	1:40.530	3	1
4	5	(France) Johann Zarco	Ducati	1:40.821	1:40.577	4	2
5	36	(Spain) Joan Mir	Suzuki	Qualified in Q2	1:40.704	5	2
6	41	(Spain) Aleix Espargaró	Aprilia	Qualified in Q2	1:40.893^{1}	9^{2}	3
7	43	(Australia) Jack Miller	Ducati	Qualified in Q2	1:40.893^{1}	6	2
8	88	(Portugal) Miguel Oliveira	KTM	1:40.771	1:41.328	7	3
9	21	(Italy) Franco Morbidelli	Yamaha	Qualified in Q2	1:41.557	8	3
10	33	(South Africa) Brad Binder	KTM	Qualified in Q2	1:41.781	10	4
11	20	(France) Fabio Quartararo	Yamaha	Qualified in Q2	1:41.943	11	4
12	4	(Italy) Andrea Dovizioso	Ducati	Qualified in Q2	1:42.249	12	4
13	6	(Germany) Stefan Bradl	Honda	1:41.010	N/A	13	5
14	73	(Spain) Álex Márquez	Honda	1:41.276	N/A	14	5
15	12	(Spain) Maverick Viñales	Yamaha	1:41.310	N/A	PL^{3}	
16	35	(United Kingdom) Cal Crutchlow	Honda	1:41.311	N/A	15	5
17	63	(Italy) Francesco Bagnaia	Ducati	1:41.395	N/A	16	6
18	46	(Italy) Valentino Rossi	Yamaha	1:42.039	N/A	17	6
19	9	(Italy) Danilo Petrucci	Ducati	1:42.244	N/A	18	6
20	32	(Italy) Lorenzo Savadori	Aprilia	1:42.532	N/A	19	7
21	53	(Spain) Tito Rabat	Ducati	1:43.030	N/A	20	7
OFFICIAL MOTOGP QUALIFYING RESULTS

Notes

- ^1 – Aleix Espargaró and Jack Miller set identical times in Q2; Aleix Espargaró was classified ahead as he set his lap time before Miller.
- ^2 – Aleix Espargaró received a 3-place grid penalty for ignoring blue flags.
- ^3 – Maverick Viñales received a penalty for the start of the pit lane for changing the engine and mounting the sixth of the season.

== Warm up ==
=== MotoGP ===
In the warm up, Joan Mir was the fastest ahead of Aleix Espargaró and Jack Miller.

== Race ==
=== MotoGP ===
Pos.	No.	Rider	Team	Manufacturer	Laps	Time/Retired	Grid	Points
1	36	(Spain) Joan Mir	Team Suzuki Ecstar	Suzuki	27	41:37.297	5	25
2	42	(Spain) Álex Rins	Team Suzuki Ecstar	Suzuki	27	+0.651	2	20
3	44	(Spain) Pol Espargaró	Red Bull KTM Factory Racing	KTM	27	+1.203	1	16
4	30	(Japan) Takaaki Nakagami	LCR Honda Idemitsu	Honda	27	+2.194	3	13
5	88	(Portugal) Miguel Oliveira	Red Bull KTM Tech3	KTM	27	+8.046	7	11
6	43	(Australia) Jack Miller	Pramac Racing	Ducati	27	+8.755	6	10
7	33	(South Africa) Brad Binder	Red Bull KTM Factory Racing	KTM	27	+10.137	10	9
8	4	(Italy) Andrea Dovizioso	Ducati Team	Ducati	27	+10.801	12	8
9	5	(France) Johann Zarco	Esponsorama Racing	Ducati	27	+11.550	4	7
10	9	(Italy) Danilo Petrucci	Ducati Team	Ducati	27	+16.803	18	6
11	21	(Italy) Franco Morbidelli	Petronas Yamaha SRT	Yamaha	27	+17.617	8	5
12	6	(Germany) Stefan Bradl	Repsol Honda Team	Honda	27	+24.350	13	4
13	12	(Spain) Maverick Viñales	Monster Energy Yamaha MotoGP	Yamaha	27	+25.403	PL	3
14	20	(France) Fabio Quartararo	Petronas Yamaha SRT	Yamaha	27	+39.639	11	2
Ret	32	(Italy) Lorenzo Savadori	Aprilia Racing Team Gresini	Aprilia	25	Electronics	19	
Ret	73	(Spain) Álex Márquez	Repsol Honda Team	Honda	23	Accident	14	
Ret	53	(Spain) Tito Rabat	Esponsorama Racing	Ducati	13	Mechanical	20	
Ret	63	(Italy) Francesco Bagnaia	Pramac Racing	Ducati	5	Accident	16	
Ret	35	(United Kingdom) Cal Crutchlow	LCR Honda Castrol	Honda	5	Accident	15	
Ret	46	(Italy) Valentino Rossi	Monster Energy Yamaha MotoGP	Yamaha	4	Engine	17	
Ret	41	(Spain) Aleix Espargaró	Aprilia Racing Team Gresini	Aprilia	0	Accident	9	
Fastest lap: (South Africa) Brad Binder (KTM) – 1:31.884 (lap 22)

=== Moto2 ===
Pos.	No.	Rider	Manufacturer	Laps	Time/Retired	Grid	Points
1	72	(Italy) Marco Bezzecchi	Kalex	25	40:06.441	5	25
2	88	(Spain) Jorge Martín	Kalex	25	+1.941	6	20
3	87	(Australia) Remy Gardner	Kalex	25	+3.553	4	16
4	33	(Italy) Enea Bastianini	Kalex	25	+4.494	15	13
5	7	(Italy) Lorenzo Baldassarri	Kalex	25	+4.648	8	11
6	10	(Italy) Luca Marini	Kalex	25	+5.142	7	10
7	40	(Spain) Héctor Garzó	Kalex	25	+5.224	9	9
8	11	(Italy) Nicolò Bulega	Kalex	25	+8.104	10	8
9	97	(Spain) Xavi Vierge	Kalex	25	+8.746	1	7
10	9	(Spain) Jorge Navarro	Speed Up	25	+11.930	19	6
11	44	(Spain) Arón Canet	Speed Up	25	+12.451	20	5
12	45	(Japan) Tetsuta Nagashima	Kalex	25	+13.209	22	4
13	23	(Germany) Marcel Schrötter	Kalex	25	+13.585	16	3
14	64	(Netherlands) Bo Bendsneyder	NTS	25	+15.528	14	2
15	62	(Italy) Stefano Manzi	MV Agusta	25	+19.284	21	1
16	42	(Spain) Marcos Ramírez	Kalex	25	+20.085	27	
17	57	(Spain) Edgar Pons	Kalex	25	+21.512	23	
18	27	(Indonesia) Andi Farid Izdihar	Kalex	25	+22.965	12	
19	12	(Switzerland) Thomas Lüthi	Kalex	25	+24.769	13	
20	19	(Italy) Lorenzo Dalla Porta	Kalex	25	+34.173	25	
21	99	(Malaysia) Kasma Daniel	Kalex	25	+44.355	24	
22	74	(Poland) Piotr Biesiekirski	NTS	25	+59.450	28	
Ret	22	(United Kingdom) Sam Lowes	Kalex	18	Accident Damage	3	
Ret	35	(Thailand) Somkiat Chantra	Kalex	9	Accident	26	
Ret	24	(Italy) Simone Corsi	MV Agusta	5	Accident	18	
Ret	21	(Italy) Fabio Di Giannantonio	Speed Up	2	Accident	11	
Ret	16	(United States) Joe Roberts	Kalex	1	Accident	2	
Ret	55	(Malaysia) Hafizh Syahrin	Speed Up	1	Accident	17	
DNS	37	(Spain) Augusto Fernández	Kalex		Did not start		
DNS	96	(United Kingdom) Jake Dixon	Kalex		Did not start		
OFFICIAL MOTO2 RACE REPORT

- Augusto Fernández suffered a foot injury in a crash during practice and withdrew from the event.
- Jake Dixon suffered a fractured right wrist in a crash during practice and withdrew from the event.

=== Moto3 ===
Pos.	No.	Rider	Manufacturer	Laps	Time/Retired	Grid	Points
1	25	(Spain) Raúl Fernández	KTM	23	38:29.140	2	25
2	11	(Spain) Sergio García	Honda	23	+0.703	7	20
3	79	(Japan) Ai Ogura	Honda	23	+1.005	8	16
4	14	(Italy) Tony Arbolino	Honda	23	+1.037	17	13
5	40	(South Africa) Darryn Binder	KTM	23	+13.392	9	11
6	99	(Spain) Carlos Tatay	KTM	23	+13.424	13	10
7	82	(Italy) Stefano Nepa	KTM	23	+16.719	24	9
8	52	(Spain) Jeremy Alcoba	Honda	23	+16.824	29	8
9	12	(Czech Republic) Filip Salač	Honda	23	+16.964	15	7
10	71	(Japan) Ayumu Sasaki	KTM	23	+17.088	26	6
11	54	(Italy) Riccardo Rossi	KTM	23	+17.344	6	5
12	16	(Italy) Andrea Migno	KTM	23	+17.467	11	4
13	55	(Italy) Romano Fenati	Husqvarna	23	+17.589	16	3
14	53	(Turkey) Deniz Öncü	KTM	23	+18.191	27	2
15	2	(Argentina) Gabriel Rodrigo	Honda	23	+18.358	12	1
16	6	(Japan) Ryusei Yamanaka	Honda	23	+18.441	30	
17	92	(Japan) Yuki Kunii	Honda	23	+19.128	18	
18	50	(Switzerland) Jason Dupasquier	KTM	23	+19.583	20	
19	9	(Italy) Davide Pizzoli	KTM	23	+27.457	23	
20	70	(Belgium) Barry Baltus	KTM	23	+27.836	22	
21	73	(Austria) Maximilian Kofler	KTM	23	+31.328	21	
22	89	(Malaysia) Khairul Idham Pawi	Honda	23	+31.661	25	
23	13	(Italy) Celestino Vietti	KTM	23	+1:20.533	3	
Ret	23	(Italy) Niccolò Antonelli	Honda	16	Accident	31	
Ret	27	(Japan) Kaito Toba	KTM	16	Power Loss	10	
Ret	24	(Japan) Tatsuki Suzuki	Honda	13	Accident	19	
Ret	7	(Italy) Dennis Foggia	Honda	13	Accident	14	
Ret	5	(Spain) Jaume Masiá	Honda	9	Accident	28	
Ret	17	(United Kingdom) John McPhee	Honda	4	Accident	1	
Ret	21	(Spain) Alonso López	Husqvarna	2	Accident Damage	5	
DSQ	75	(Spain) Albert Arenas	KTM	10	Black flag	4	
OFFICIAL MOTO3 RACE REPORT

- Albert Arenas was black flagged for irresponsible riding.

== Championship standings after the race ==
Below are the standings for the top five riders, constructors, and teams after the round.

=== MotoGP ===
Riders' Championship standings

	Pos.	Rider	Points
	1	(Spain) Joan Mir	162
	2	(France) Fabio Quartararo	125
3	3	(Spain) Álex Rins	125
1	4	(Spain) Maverick Viñales	121
1	5	(Italy) Franco Morbidelli	117

Constructors' Championship standings

	Pos.	Constructor	Points
1	1	(Japan) Suzuki	188
1	2	(Italy) Ducati	181
	3	(Japan) Yamaha	163 (Note: Yamaha scored 213 points as a manufacturer, but were deducted 50 points after failing to respect MSMA technical changes protocols.)
	4	(Austria) KTM	159
	5	(Japan) Honda	130

Teams' Championship standings

Pos.	Team	Points
1	(Japan) Team Suzuki Ecstar	287
2	(Malaysia) Petronas Yamaha SRT	205 (Note: Petronas Yamaha SRT riders scored 242 points, but the team was deducted 37 points after failing to respect MSMA technical changes protocols.)
3	(Italy) Ducati Team	194
4	(Austria) Red Bull KTM Factory Racing	182
5	(Japan) Monster Energy Yamaha MotoGP	159 (Note: Monster Energy Yamaha MotoGP riders scored 179 points, but the team was deducted 20 points after failing to respect MSMA technical changes protocols.)

=== Moto2 ===
Riders' Championship standings

	Pos.	Rider	Points
1	1	(Italy) Enea Bastianini	184
1	2	(United Kingdom) Sam Lowes	178
	3	(Italy) Luca Marini	165
	4	(Italy) Marco Bezzecchi	155
	5	(Spain) Jorge Martín	125

Constructors' Championship standings

Pos.	Constructor	Points
1	(Germany) Kalex	325
2	(Italy) Speed Up	117
3	(Italy) MV Agusta	32
4	(Japan) NTS	11

Teams' Championship standings

Pos.	Team	Points
1	(Italy) Sky Racing Team VR46	320
2	(Belgium) EG 0,0 Marc VDS	240
3	(Finland) Red Bull KTM Ajo	210
4	(Italy) Italtrans Racing Team	189
5	(Germany) Liqui Moly Intact GP	136

=== Moto3 ===
Riders' Championship standings

	Pos.	Rider	Points
	1	(Spain) Albert Arenas	157
	2	(Japan) Ai Ogura	154
	3	(Italy) Celestino Vietti	137
2	4	(Italy) Tony Arbolino	134
1	5	(Spain) Jaume Masiá	133

Constructors' Championship standings

Pos.	Constructor	Points
1	(Japan) Honda	281
2	(Austria) KTM	277
3	(Sweden) Husqvarna	82

Teams' Championship standings

	Pos.	Team	Points
	1	(Luxembourg) Leopard Racing	202
1	2	(Spain) Valresa Aspar Team Moto3	192
1	3	(Italy) Sky Racing Team VR46	188
	4	(Italy) Rivacold Snipers Team	164
2	5	(Finland) Red Bull KTM Ajo	158

== Notes ==
Previous race: 2020 Teruel Grand Prix	FIM Grand Prix World Championship; 2020 season	Next race: 2020 Valencian Grand Prix
Previous race: 1995 European Grand Prix	European motorcycle Grand Prix	Next race: None
