= 2020 Teruel motorcycle Grand Prix =

(Province of Teruel) 2020 Teruel Grand Prix
Race details
- Race 12 of 15 races in the 2020 Grand Prix motorcycle racing season
- Date: 25 October 2020
- Official name: Gran Premio Liqui Moly de Teruel
- Location: MotorLand Aragón; Alcañiz, Spain
- Course: Permanent racing facility; 5.077 km (3.155 mi)

MotoGP
Pole position
Rider	(Japan) Takaaki Nakagami	Honda
Time	1:46.882	
Fastest lap
Rider	(Italy) Franco Morbidelli	Yamaha
Time	1:48.089 on lap 5	
Podium
First	(Italy) Franco Morbidelli	Yamaha
Second	(Spain) Álex Rins	Suzuki
Third	(Spain) Joan Mir	Suzuki

Moto2
Pole position
Rider	(United Kingdom) Sam Lowes	Kalex
Time	1:51.296	
Fastest lap
Rider	(United Kingdom) Sam Lowes	Kalex
Time	1:51.730 on lap 2	
Podium
First	(United Kingdom) Sam Lowes	Kalex
Second	(Italy) Fabio Di Giannantonio	Speed Up
Third	(Italy) Enea Bastianini	Kalex

Moto3
Pole position
Rider	(Spain) Raúl Fernández	KTM
Time	1:57.199	
Fastest lap
Rider	(Spain) Sergio García	Honda
Time	1:57.976 on lap 2	
Podium
First	(Spain) Jaume Masiá	Honda
Second	(Japan) Ayumu Sasaki	KTM
Third	(Japan) Kaito Toba	KTM

The 2020 Teruel motorcycle Grand Prix (officially known as the Gran Premio Liqui Moly de Teruel) was the twelfth round of the 2020 Grand Prix motorcycle racing season and the eleventh round of the 2020 MotoGP World Championship. It was held at the MotorLand Aragón in Alcañiz on 25 October 2020.

At this round, Jaume Masiá with Leopard Racing takes record 800th Grand Prix win for Honda. Beginning with its first world grand prix race in 1961, in the 125cc class of the Spanish Grand Prix, Honda has now achieved an unprecedented 800th grand prix wins.

== Background ==
=== Impact of the COVID-19 pandemic ===
The opening rounds of the 2020 championship have been heavily affected by the COVID-19 pandemic. The Aragon Grand Prix, scheduled in the original calendar on October 4 as the sixteenth race of the season, was brought forward by a week following the initial postponement of the Thailand Grand Prix (later cancelled on July 31) on the first Sunday in October (the Thailand stage was initially scheduled for 22 March as the second leg of the championship). Several Grands Prix were cancelled or postponed after the aborted opening round in Qatar, prompting the Fédération Internationale de Motocyclisme to draft a new calendar. A new calendar based exclusively in Europe was announced on 11 June. The race in Aragon was placed on 18 October as the tenth GP of the season.

The race organizers signed a contract with Dorna Sports, owner of the commercial rights to the sport, to host a second round on the circuit on 25 October (one week after the first race) known as the "Teruel Grand Prix". The race was named for the Teruel province of the autonomous community of Aragon where the MotorLand Aragón is located. The race is the fourth time in the history of the sport that the same venue and circuit track have hosted consecutive World Championship races, and it is the second time it has taken place in Spain.

=== MotoGP Championship standings before the race ===
After the tenth round of the 2020 Aragon Grand Prix, Joan Mir became the new leader of the drivers' classification with 121 points, six more than the previous leader Fabio Quartararo, who in the previous race had closed out of the points zone. Third with 109 points Maverick Viñales, who overtook Andrea Dovizioso, now fourth with 106 points. Fifth is Takaaki Nakagami with 92 points.

In the manufacturers' standings, Yamaha leads with 183 points, followed by Ducati with 160 points. Suzuki is third with 143 points and has overtaken KTM, now fourth at 130. Honda is fifth at 112 points, while Aprilia closes the standings with 35 points.

In the team championship, Team Suzuki Ecstar surpasses Petronas Yamaha SRT with 206 points, with the Malaysian team now second by 4 points less from the leader. Ducati Team and Monster Energy Yamaha follow with 171 and 167 points respectively, and KTM Factory Racing with 144 points.

=== MotoGP Entrants ===
- Stefan Bradl replaced Marc Márquez for the ninth straight race while the latter recovered from injuries sustained in his opening round crash.
- Valentino Rossi tested positive for the SARS-CoV-2 virus on October 15, requiring him to remain in quarantine for a minimum of 10 days under Italian law and forcing him to skip the Teruel round after the Aragon round. Yamaha confirmed that it would not field a replacement for Rossi's bike.

== Free practice ==
=== MotoGP ===
In the first session Álex Márquez was the fastest ahead of Takaaki Nakagami and Joan Mir. In the second session Nakagami preceded Maverick Viñales and Cal Crutchlow. In the third session Franco Morbidelli set the best time ahead of Nakagami and Fabio Quartararo.

=== Combined Free Practice 1-2-3 ===
The top ten riders (written in bold) qualified in Q2.

Pos.	No.	Bikers	Constructor	Free practice times		
Pos.	No.	Bikers	Constructor	FP1	FP2	FP3
1	21	(Italy) **Franco Morbidelli**	**Yamaha**	1:49.100	1:48.612	1:47.333
2	30	(Japan) **Takaaki Nakagami**	**Honda**	1:48.622	1:47.782	1:47.392
3	20	(France) **Fabio Quartararo**	**Yamaha**	1:49.621	1:48.164	1:47.401
4	12	(Spain) **Maverick Viñales**	**Yamaha**	1:49.176	1:47.957	1:47.473
5	73	(Spain) **Álex Márquez**	**Honda**	1:48.184	1:48.443	1:47.546
6	27	(Spain) **Iker Lecuona**	**KTM**	1:49.501	1:48.360	1:47.548
7	42	(Spain) **Álex Rins**	**Suzuki**	1:49.372	1:48.190	1:47.554
8	88	(Portugal) **Miguel Oliveira**	**KTM**	1:49.442	1:48.527	1:47.625
9	35	(United Kingdom) **Cal Crutchlow**	**Honda**	1:49.356	1:48.111	1:47.708
10	36	(Spain) **Joan Mir**	**Suzuki**	1:48.993	1:48.182	1:47.715
11	43	(Australia) Jack Miller	Ducati	1:49.211	1:49.794	1:47.739
12	41	(Spain) Aleix Espargaró	Aprilia	1:49.305	1:48.426	1:47.742
13	33	(South Africa) Brad Binder	KTM	1:49.962	1:48.545	1:47.822
14	4	(Italy) Andrea Dovizioso	Ducati	1:49.512	1:49.240	1:47.878
15	53	(Spain) Tito Rabat	Ducati	1'50.215	1:49.733	1:48.023
16	44	(Spain) Pol Espargaró	KTM	1:49.346	1:48.439	1:48.025
17	9	(Italy) Danilo Petrucci	Ducati	1:49.482	1:48.870	1:48.096
18	63	(Italy) Francesco Bagnaia	Ducati	1'50.251	1:49.319	1:48.134
19	6	(Germany) Stefan Bradl	Honda	1:49.003	1:48.444	1:48.255
20	38	(United Kingdom) Bradley Smith	Aprilia	1:49.727	1:48.810	1:48.471
21	5	(France) Johann Zarco	Ducati	1:49.360	1:48.532	1:48.501
OFFICIAL MOTOGP COMBINED FREE PRACTICE TIMES REPORT

Fastest session lap

Personal Best lap

In the fourth session Viñales was the fastest ahead of Nakagami and Joan Mir.

== Qualifying ==
=== MotoGP ===
Pos.	No.	Biker	Constructor	Qualifying times		Final grid	Row
Pos.	No.	Biker	Constructor	Q1	Q2	Final grid	Row
1	30	(Japan) Takaaki Nakagami	Honda	Qualified in Q2	1:46.882	1	1
2	21	(Italy) Franco Morbidelli	Yamaha	Qualified in Q2	1:46.945	2	1
3	42	(Spain) Álex Rins	Suzuki	Qualified in Q2	1:47.155	3	1
4	12	(Spain) Maverick Viñales	Yamaha	Qualified in Q2	1:47.241	4	2
5	5	(France) Johann Zarco	Ducati	1:47.303	1:47.297	5	2
6	20	(France) Fabio Quartararo	Yamaha	Qualified in Q2	1:47.326	6	2
7	35	(United Kingdom) Cal Crutchlow	Honda	Qualified in Q2	1:47.377	7	3
8	88	(Portugal) Miguel Oliveira	KTM	Qualified in Q2	1:47.509	8	3
9	44	(Spain) Pol Espargaró	KTM	1:47.071	1:47.519	9	3
10	73	(Spain) Álex Márquez	Honda	Qualified in Q2	1:47.603	10	4
11	27	(Spain) Iker Lecuona	KTM	Qualified in Q2	1:47.621	11	4
12	36	(Spain) Joan Mir	Suzuki	Qualified in Q2	1:47.642	12	4
13	41	(Spain) Aleix Espargaró	Aprilia	1:47.372	N/A	13	5
14	43	(Australia) Jack Miller	Ducati	1:47.394	N/A	14	5
15	33	(South Africa) Brad Binder	KTM	1:47.478	N/A	15	5
16	6	(Germany) Stefan Bradl	Honda	1:47.585	N/A	13	6
17	4	(Italy) Andrea Dovizioso	Ducati	1:47.747	N/A	17	6
18	63	(Italy) Francesco Bagnaia	Ducati	1:47.759	N/A	18	6
19	9	(Italy) Danilo Petrucci	Ducati	1:47.855	N/A	19	7
20	53	(Spain) Tito Rabat	Ducati	1:48.114	N/A	20	7
21	38	(United Kingdom) Bradley Smith	Aprilia	1:48.402	N/A	21	7
OFFICIAL MOTOGP QUALIFYING RESULTS

== Warm up ==
=== MotoGP ===
In the warm up, Takaaki Nakagami was the fastest ahead of Franco Morbidelli and Álex Márquez.

== Race ==
=== MotoGP ===
Pos.	No.	Rider	Team	Manufacturer	Laps	Time/Retired	Grid	Points
1	21	(Italy) Franco Morbidelli	Petronas Yamaha SRT	Yamaha	23	41:47.652	2	25
2	42	(Spain) Álex Rins	Team Suzuki Ecstar	Suzuki	23	+2.205	3	20
3	36	(Spain) Joan Mir	Team Suzuki Ecstar	Suzuki	23	+5.376	12	16
4	44	(Spain) Pol Espargaró	Red Bull KTM Factory Racing	KTM	23	+10.299	9	13
5	5	(France) Johann Zarco	Esponsorama Racing	Ducati	23	+12.915	5	11
6	88	(Portugal) Miguel Oliveira	Red Bull KTM Tech3	KTM	23	+12.953	8	10
7	12	(Spain) Maverick Viñales	Monster Energy Yamaha MotoGP	Yamaha	23	+14.262	4	9
8	20	(France) Fabio Quartararo	Petronas Yamaha SRT	Yamaha	23	+14.720	6	8
9	27	(Spain) Iker Lecuona	Red Bull KTM Tech3	KTM	23	+17.177	11	7
10	9	(Italy) Danilo Petrucci	Ducati Team	Ducati	23	+19.519	19	6
11	35	(United Kingdom) Cal Crutchlow	LCR Honda Castrol	Honda	23	+19.708	7	5
12	6	(Germany) Stefan Bradl	Repsol Honda Team	Honda	23	+20.591	16	4
13	4	(Italy) Andrea Dovizioso	Ducati Team	Ducati	23	+22.222	17	3
14	53	(Spain) Tito Rabat	Esponsorama Racing	Ducati	23	+26.496	20	2
15	38	(United Kingdom) Bradley Smith	Aprilia Racing Team Gresini	Aprilia	23	+31.816	21	1
Ret	41	(Spain) Aleix Espargaró	Aprilia Racing Team Gresini	Aprilia	20	Engine	13	
Ret	73	(Spain) Álex Márquez	Repsol Honda Team	Honda	13	Accident	10	
Ret	63	(Italy) Francesco Bagnaia	Pramac Racing	Ducati	5	Engine	18	
Ret	30	(Japan) Takaaki Nakagami	LCR Honda Idemitsu	Honda	0	Accident	1	
Ret	43	(Australia) Jack Miller	Pramac Racing	Ducati	0	Collision	14	
Ret	33	(South Africa) Brad Binder	Red Bull KTM Factory Racing	KTM	0	Collision	15	
Fastest lap: (Italy) Franco Morbidelli (Yamaha) – 1:48.089 (lap 5)

=== Moto2 ===
Pos.	No.	Rider	Manufacturer	Laps	Time/Retired	Grid	Points
1	22	(United Kingdom) Sam Lowes	Kalex	21	39:27.645	1	25
2	21	(Italy) Fabio Di Giannantonio	Speed Up	21	+8.425	4	20
3	33	(Italy) Enea Bastianini	Kalex	21	+10.871	6	16
4	87	(Australia) Remy Gardner	Kalex	21	+12.657	3	13
5	9	(Spain) Jorge Navarro	Speed Up	21	+13.006	2	11
6	88	(Spain) Jorge Martín	Kalex	21	+14.766	12	10
7	96	(United Kingdom) Jake Dixon	Kalex	21	+16.905	7	9
8	37	(Spain) Augusto Fernández	Kalex	21	+17.027	9	8
9	42	(Spain) Marcos Ramírez	Kalex	21	+21.888	5	7
10	16	(United States) Joe Roberts	Kalex	21	+22.951	13	6
11	10	(Italy) Luca Marini	Kalex	21	+24.969	11	5
12	97	(Spain) Xavi Vierge	Kalex	21	+26.206	22	4
13	55	(Malaysia) Hafizh Syahrin	Speed Up	21	+26.317	20	3
14	45	(Japan) Tetsuta Nagashima	Kalex	21	+26.685	25	2
15	24	(Italy) Simone Corsi	MV Agusta	21	+26.899	24	1
16	64	(Netherlands) Bo Bendsneyder	NTS	21	+27.404	10	
17	11	(Italy) Nicolò Bulega	Kalex	21	+30.319	21	
18	19	(Italy) Lorenzo Dalla Porta	Kalex	21	+30.707	23	
19	35	(Thailand) Somkiat Chantra	Kalex	21	+30.980	19	
20	23	(Germany) Marcel Schrötter	Kalex	21	+31.501	16	
21	27	(Indonesia) Andi Farid Izdihar	Kalex	21	+47.953	29	
22	18	(Andorra) Xavi Cardelús	Speed Up	21	+48.375	28	
23	74	(Poland) Piotr Biesiekirski	NTS	21	+1:00.394	30	
Ret	62	(Italy) Stefano Manzi	MV Agusta	20	Accident	18	
Ret	57	(Spain) Edgar Pons	Kalex	19	Accident	15	
Ret	7	(Italy) Lorenzo Baldassarri	Kalex	15	Accident	17	
Ret	40	(Spain) Héctor Garzó	Kalex	10	Accident	8	
Ret	72	(Italy) Marco Bezzecchi	Kalex	3	Accident	14	
Ret	12	(Switzerland) Thomas Lüthi	Kalex	0	Collision	26	
Ret	99	(Malaysia) Kasma Daniel	Kalex	0	Collision	27	
OFFICIAL MOTO2 RACE REPORT

=== Moto3 ===
Pos.	No.	Rider	Manufacturer	Laps	Time/Retired	Grid	Points
1	5	(Spain) Jaume Masiá	Honda	19	37:44.602	7	25
2	71	(Japan) Ayumu Sasaki	KTM	19	+0.051	6	20
3	27	(Japan) Kaito Toba	KTM	19	+0.152	8	16
4	75	(Spain) Albert Arenas	KTM	19	+0.296	5	13
5	13	(Italy) Celestino Vietti	KTM	19	+0.331	3	11
6	17	(United Kingdom) John McPhee	Honda	19	+0.372	17	10
7	53	(Turkey) Deniz Öncü	KTM	19	+0.583	18	9
8	40	(South Africa) Darryn Binder	KTM	19	+0.772	15	8
9	79	(Japan) Ai Ogura	Honda	19	+0.955	10	7
10	14	(Italy) Tony Arbolino	Honda	19	+2.259	2	6
11	21	(Spain) Alonso López	Husqvarna	19	+2.489	21	5
12	25	(Spain) Raúl Fernández	KTM	19	+2.493	1	4
13	12	(Czech Republic) Filip Salač	Honda	19	+2.520	11	3
14	2	(Argentina) Gabriel Rodrigo	Honda	19	+2.686	4	2
15	52	(Spain) Jeremy Alcoba	Honda	19	+2.745	14	1
16	7	(Italy) Dennis Foggia	Honda	19	+2.895	12	
17	99	(Spain) Carlos Tatay	KTM	19	+3.019	20	
18	16	(Italy) Andrea Migno	KTM	19	+3.622	26	
19	55	(Italy) Romano Fenati	Husqvarna	19	+5.448	13	
20	82	(Italy) Stefano Nepa	KTM	19	+5.620	16	
21	70	(Belgium) Barry Baltus	KTM	19	+5.680	23	
22	23	(Italy) Niccolò Antonelli	Honda	19	+6.103	19	
23	6	(Japan) Ryusei Yamanaka	Honda	19	+16.543	25	
24	50	(Switzerland) Jason Dupasquier	KTM	19	+21.606	30	
25	92	(Japan) Yuki Kunii	Honda	19	+21.716	22	
26	9	(Italy) Davide Pizzoli	KTM	19	+21.812	24	
27	89	(Malaysia) Khairul Idham Pawi	Honda	19	+32.799	27	
28	73	(Austria) Maximilian Kofler	KTM	19	+33.600	29	
Ret	24	(Japan) Tatsuki Suzuki	Honda	18	Accident	9	
Ret	11	(Spain) Sergio García	Honda	18	Collision	28	
OFFICIAL MOTO3 RACE REPORT

== Championship standings after the race ==
Below are the standings for the top five riders, constructors, and teams after the round.

=== MotoGP ===
Riders' Championship standings

	Pos.	Rider	Points
	1	(Spain) Joan Mir	137
	2	(France) Fabio Quartararo	123
	3	(Spain) Maverick Viñales	118
2	4	(Italy) Franco Morbidelli	112
1	5	(Italy) Andrea Dovizioso	109

Constructors' Championship standings

Pos.	Constructor	Points
1	(Italy) Ducati	171
2	(Japan) Suzuki	163
3	(Japan) Yamaha	158 (Note: Yamaha scored 208 points as a manufacturer, but were deducted 50 points after failing to respect MSMA technical changes protocols.)
4	(Austria) KTM	143
5	(Japan) Honda	117

Teams' Championship standings

	Pos.	Team	Points
	1	(Japan) Team Suzuki Ecstar	242
1	2	(Malaysia) Petronas Yamaha SRT	198 (Note: Petronas Yamaha SRT riders scored 235 points, but the team was deducted 37 points after failing to respect MSMA technical changes protocols.)
1	3	(Italy) Ducati Team	180
1	4	(Austria) Red Bull KTM Factory Racing	157
1	5	(Japan) Monster Energy Yamaha MotoGP	156 (Note: Monster Energy Yamaha MotoGP riders scored 176 points, but the team was deducted 20 points after failing to respect MSMA technical changes protocols.)

=== Moto2 ===
Riders' Championship standings

	Pos.	Rider	Points
1	1	(United Kingdom) Sam Lowes	178
1	2	(Italy) Enea Bastianini	171
	3	(Italy) Luca Marini	155
	4	(Italy) Marco Bezzecchi	130
	5	(Spain) Jorge Martín	105

Constructors' Championship standings

Pos.	Constructor	Points
1	(Germany) Kalex	300
2	(Italy) Speed Up	111
3	(Italy) MV Agusta	31
4	(Japan) NTS	9

Teams' Championship standings

Pos.	Team	Points
1	(Italy) Sky Racing Team VR46	285
2	(Belgium) EG 0,0 Marc VDS	240
3	(Finland) Red Bull KTM Ajo	186
4	(Italy) Italtrans Racing Team	176
5	(Germany) Liqui Moly Intact GP	133

=== Moto3 ===
Riders' Championship standings

	Pos.	Rider	Points
	1	(Spain) Albert Arenas	157
	2	(Japan) Ai Ogura	138
	3	(Italy) Celestino Vietti	137
2	4	(Spain) Jaume Masiá	133
1	5	(Italy) Tony Arbolino	121

Constructors' Championship standings

Pos.	Constructor	Points
1	(Japan) Honda	261
2	(Austria) KTM	252
3	(Sweden) Husqvarna	79

Teams' Championship standings

	Pos.	Team	Points
	1	(Luxembourg) Leopard Racing	202
	2	(Italy) Sky Racing Team VR46	184
	3	(Spain) Solunion Aspar Team Moto3	183
	4	(Italy) Rivacold Snipers Team	144
1	5	(Japan) Honda Team Asia	138

== Notes ==
Previous race: 2020 Aragon Grand Prix	FIM Grand Prix World Championship; 2020 season	Next race: 2020 European Grand Prix
Previous race: None	Teruel motorcycle Grand Prix	Next race: None
