= 2020 MotoGP World Championship =

72nd running of the MotoGP World Championship

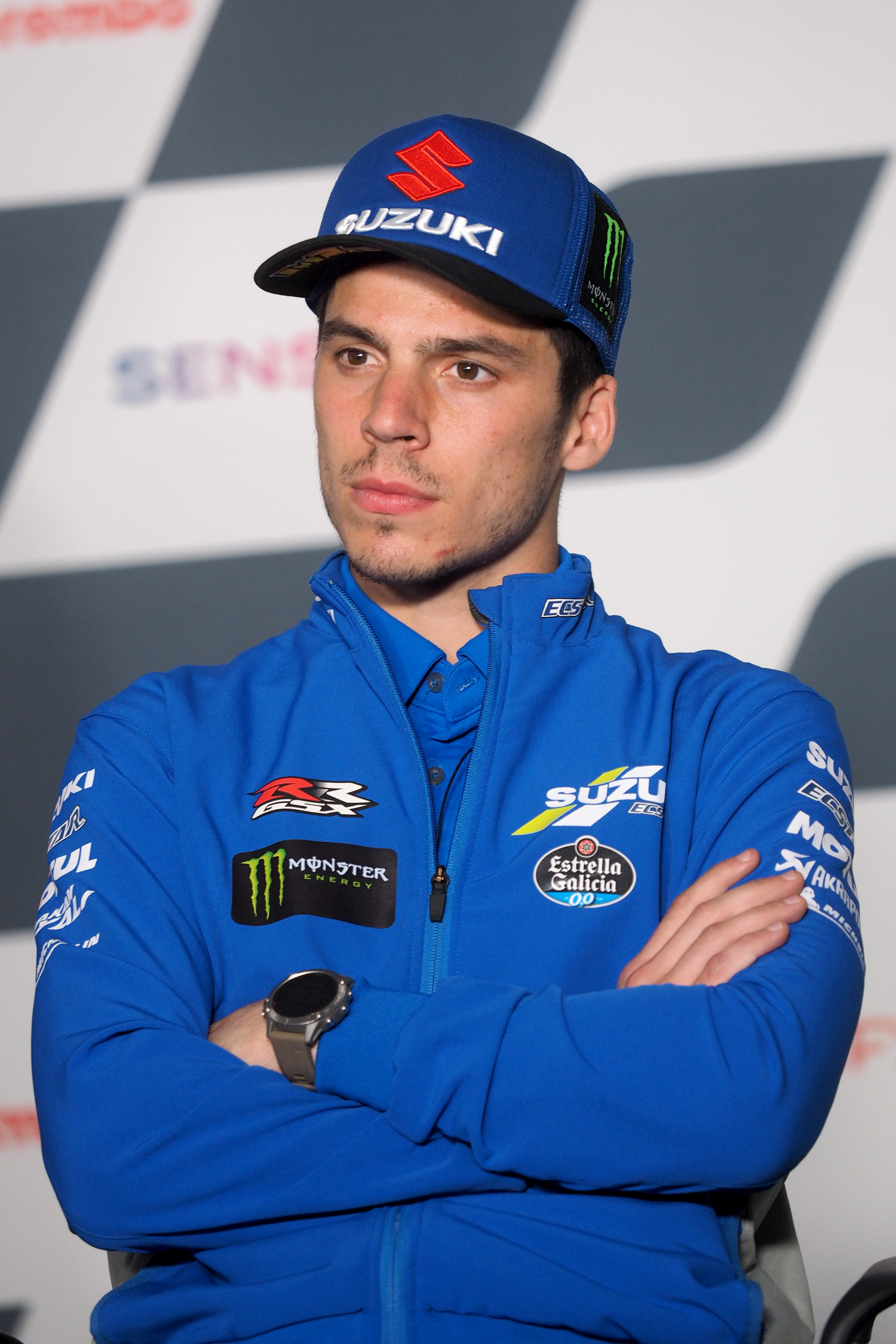
Joan Mir (pictured in 2021) was the 2020 MotoGP World Riders' Champion.

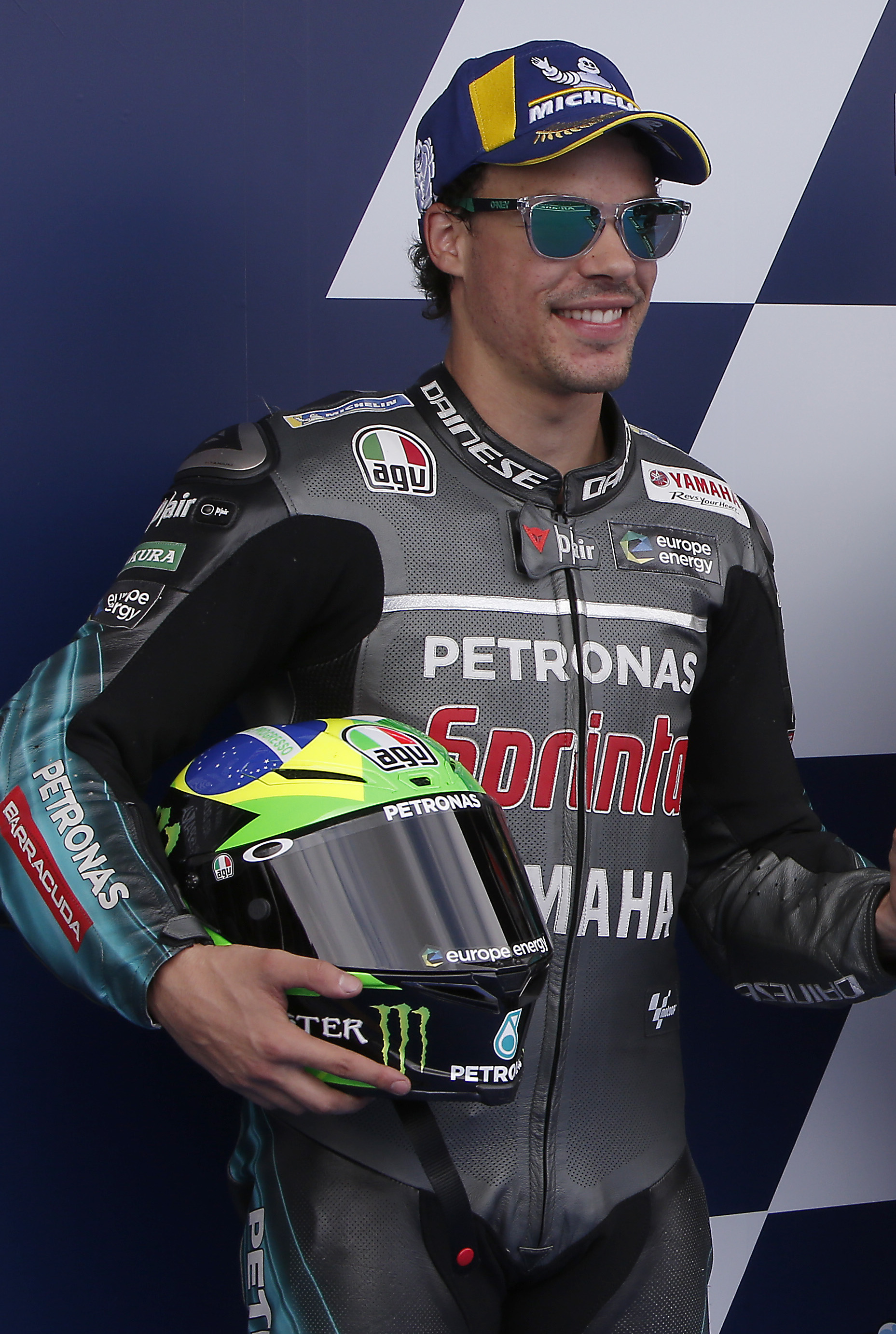
Franco Morbidelli (pictured in 2019) finished runner-up.

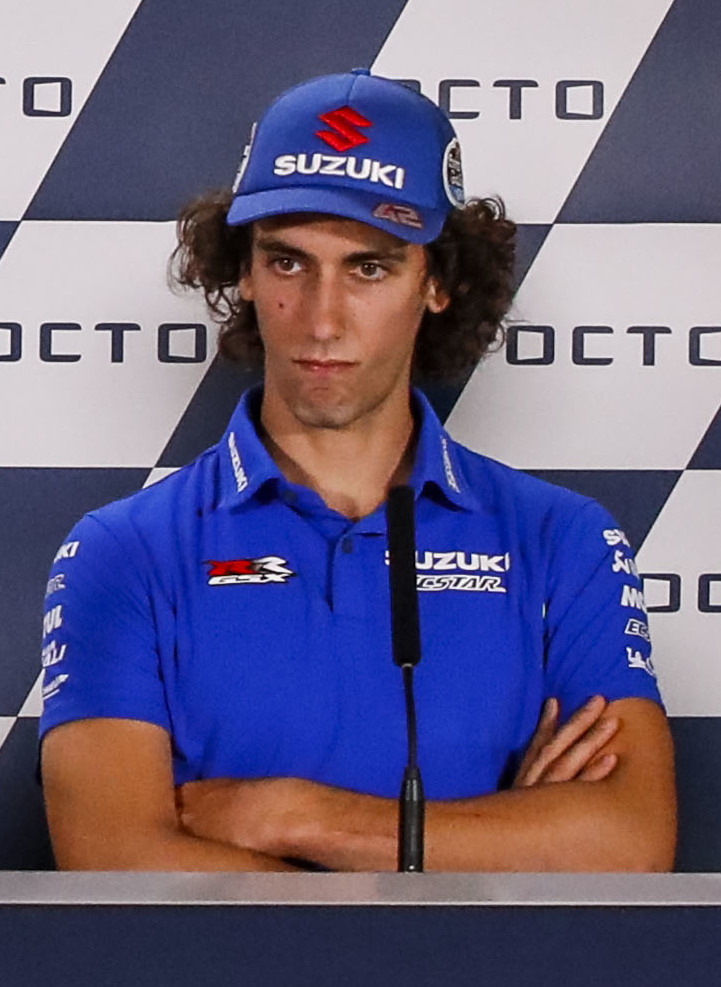
Álex Rins (pictured in 2019) finished third.

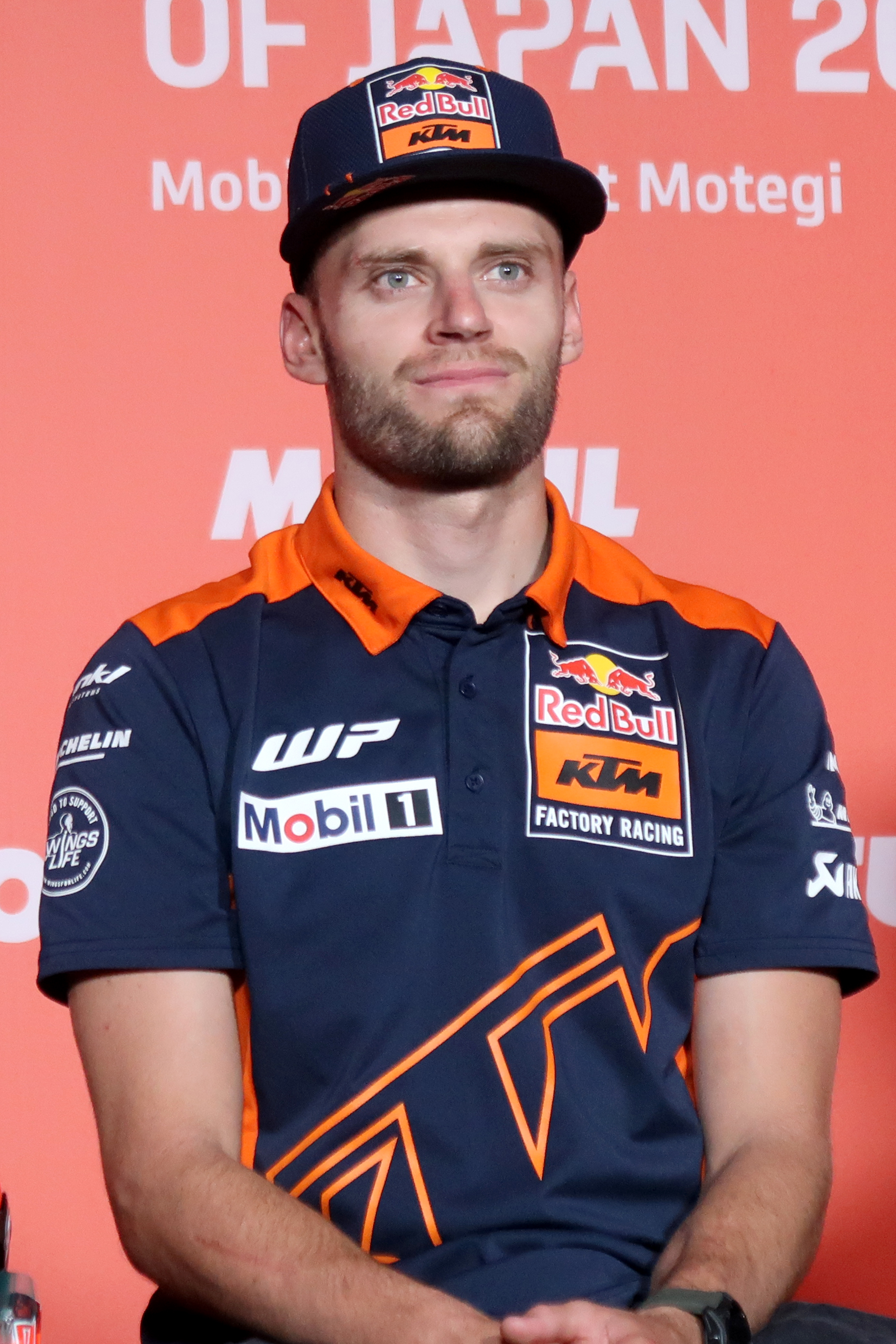
Brad Binder (pictured in 2023), the 2020 MotoGP Rookie of the Year.

The 2020 FIM MotoGP World Championship was the premier class of the 72nd Fédération Internationale de Motocyclisme (FIM) Road Racing World Championship season, the highest level of competition in motorcycle road racing.

The season was notably characterized by the effects of the COVID-19 pandemic, the absence of perennial title favourite and defending champion Marc Márquez due to a serious arm injury, the high number of wins from different riders, teams and constructors, and the Yamaha engine controversy.

Joan Mir secured his maiden MotoGP title and Team Suzuki Ecstar secured their first and only team championship at the penultimate round. Mir's championship was the first for a Suzuki rider since 2000. Mir won the title by 13 points ahead of Franco Morbidelli. Ducati won the constructors' championship following a 50-point deduction for Yamaha, despite having no riders in the championship's top three.

== Season summary ==
Marc Márquez and Repsol Honda Team started the season as the defending World Champion and World Constructors' champions respectively, after they both won their championships in 2019 for the fourth consecutive season. After an opening round crash resulting in a fractured humerus, and an aborted return attempt the following week, Márquez sat out the remainder of the season, meaning he could not win the title for a fifth consecutive time. Former premier class world champion Valentino Rossi had a career-low season, finishing the championship outside of the top 7 for the first time in his career, ending 15th.

By mid-November, Joan Mir secured the riders' title with one win and seven podiums and Team Suzuki Ecstar clinched the teams' championship. Ducati took the constructors' championship in the final round in Portugal, helped by the 50-point penalty handed to Yamaha earlier in the season. This was Ducati's first constructors' title since Casey Stoner's dominant 2007 season.

Riders Fabio Quartararo, Brad Binder, Miguel Oliveira, Franco Morbidelli and Joan Mir won their first premier class victories during the season and KTM took their first wins as a constructor. Five riders taking their inaugural victories in the season surpassed the record set in the 2016 season. In addition, three teams (Petronas SRT, KTM Factory Racing and Tech3, respectively) won their first races in the premier class. Between the Czech Republic and Aragon Grands Prix, different riders won in eight successive races, equalling the previous record set between the 2016 Italian and San Marino Grands Prix. A total of 9 different riders won a race in the season, also matching the record set in 2016. Morbidelli and Quartararo won three races each, Oliveira two, with Binder, Andrea Dovizioso, Maverick Viñales, Danilo Petrucci, Álex Rins and champion Mir (in chronological order) each having won a single race.

When Joan Mir secured the riders' championship title, he became the first Suzuki rider to win the title since Kenny Roberts Jr. in 2000, the first non-Honda or non-Yamaha rider to win the title since Ducati rider Casey Stoner in 2007, as well as the first Moto3 world champion to win the premier class title.

=== COVID-19 pandemic ===
The season calendar was significantly affected by the COVID-19 pandemic, leading to the cancellation or postponement of many races and an overall delay to the start of the season. On 11 June, the rescheduled calendar was confirmed, with the season beginning on 19 July with the Spanish Grand Prix in Jerez. On 31 July, the FIM announced that the remaining flyaway races were to be cancelled, marking the first time since 1986 that the premier class was held entirely within Europe. With a total of only 14 rounds, it was the shortest season of 500cc/MotoGP since 1998.

==== Affected riders ====
- In mid-October, Valentino Rossi became the first premier class rider to test positive for the SARS-CoV-2 virus, forcing him to miss the Aragon and Teruel rounds due to Italian quarantine regulations. A longer-than-expected recovery put his return in Valencia into question, but a pair of negative tests allowed Rossi to rejoin the paddock for the Saturday sessions of the European Grand Prix.
- Iker Lecuona missed the European Grand Prix due to Andorran quarantine rules for close contact with positive-tested individuals, after his brother and assistant both tested positive for the virus. Lecuona later tested positive for the SARS-CoV-2 virus himself, forcing him to miss the Valencian and Portuguese Grands Prix.

=== Yamaha engine controversy ===
Before the European Grand Prix in Valencia, Yamaha and its teams were handed penalties for disregarding the protocol which requires obtaining unanimous approval from the Motorcycle Sport Manufacturers Association (MSMA) for engine technical changes. Yamaha allegedly changed the specification of engine valves between the homologation freeze just before the abandoned Qatar round and the opening round in Jerez, claiming "an internal oversight". As a result, Yamaha was docked 50 points in the manufacturers' championship and the Yamaha factory team and Petronas SRT lost 20 and 37 points respectively, equal to the points scored using the non-compliant engines. No penalty was applied to individual riders' points totals. Yamaha made an official statement accepting the FIM's sanctions and confirmed it would not appeal the decision.

== Teams and riders ==
| Team | Constructor | Motorcycle | No. | Rider | Rounds |
|---|---|---|---|---|---|
| (Italy) Aprilia Racing Team Gresini | Aprilia | RS-GP | 38 | (United Kingdom) Bradley Smith (Note: Aprilia Racing Team Gresini maintained Andrea Iannone as their official entry despite his suspension, pending appeals. Replacement rider entries were made as Iannone was ineligible to participate.) | 1–11 |
| (Italy) Aprilia Racing Team Gresini | Aprilia | RS-GP | 32 | (Italy) Lorenzo Savadori | 12–14 |
| (Italy) Aprilia Racing Team Gresini | Aprilia | RS-GP | 41 | (Spain) Aleix Espargaró | All |
| (Italy) Ducati Team | Ducati | Desmosedici GP20 | 04 | (Italy) Andrea Dovizioso | All |
| (Italy) Ducati Team | Ducati | Desmosedici GP20 | 9 | (Italy) Danilo Petrucci | All |
| (Italy) Pramac Racing | Ducati | Desmosedici GP20 | 43 | (Australia) Jack Miller | All |
| (Italy) Pramac Racing | Ducati | Desmosedici GP20 | 63 | (Italy) Francesco Bagnaia | 1–3, 6–14 |
| (Italy) Pramac Racing | Ducati | Desmosedici GP20 | 51 | (Italy) Michele Pirro | 4–5 |
| (Spain) Hublot Reale Avintia Racing (Spain) Hublot Reale Avintia (Spain) Esponsorama Racing | Ducati | Desmosedici GP19 | 5 | (France) Johann Zarco | All |
| (Spain) Hublot Reale Avintia Racing (Spain) Hublot Reale Avintia (Spain) Esponsorama Racing | Ducati | Desmosedici GP19 | 53 | (Spain) Tito Rabat | All |
| (Monaco) LCR Honda Idemitsu (Monaco) LCR Honda Castrol | Honda | RC213V | 30 | (Japan) Takaaki Nakagami | All |
| (Monaco) LCR Honda Idemitsu (Monaco) LCR Honda Castrol | Honda | RC213V | 35 | (United Kingdom) Cal Crutchlow | 1–6, 8–14 |
| (Japan) Repsol Honda Team | Honda | RC213V | 73 | (Spain) Álex Márquez | All |
| (Japan) Repsol Honda Team | Honda | RC213V | 93 | (Spain) Marc Márquez | 1–2 |
| (Japan) Repsol Honda Team | Honda | RC213V | 6 | (Germany) Stefan Bradl | 3–14 |
| (Austria) Red Bull KTM Factory Racing | KTM | RC16 | 33 | (South Africa) Brad Binder | All |
| (Austria) Red Bull KTM Factory Racing | KTM | RC16 | 44 | (Spain) Pol Espargaró | All |
| (France) Red Bull KTM Tech3 | KTM | RC16 | 27 | (Spain) Iker Lecuona | 1–11, 13 (Note: Iker Lecuona was entered during round 13 but was withdrawn from the race when he tested positive for COVID-19.) |
| (France) Red Bull KTM Tech3 | KTM | RC16 | 82 | (Finland) Mika Kallio | 14 |
| (France) Red Bull KTM Tech3 | KTM | RC16 | 88 | (Portugal) Miguel Oliveira | All |
| (Japan) Team Suzuki Ecstar | Suzuki | GSX-RR | 36 | (Spain) Joan Mir | All |
| (Japan) Team Suzuki Ecstar | Suzuki | GSX-RR | 42 | (Spain) Álex Rins | All |
| (Japan) Monster Energy Yamaha MotoGP | Yamaha | YZR-M1 | 12 | (Spain) Maverick Viñales | All |
| (Japan) Monster Energy Yamaha MotoGP | Yamaha | YZR-M1 | 46 | (Italy) Valentino Rossi | 1–9, 12–14 (Note: Garrett Gerloff initially replaced Valentino Rossi during round 12 and competed in the two Friday practice sessions while Rossi was waiting for his COVID-19 test results, but was withdrawn from the race when Rossi was declared fit to race after testing negative for COVID-19.) |
| (Japan) Monster Energy Yamaha MotoGP | Yamaha | YZR-M1 | 31 | (United States) Garrett Gerloff | 12 |
| (Malaysia) Petronas Yamaha SRT | Yamaha | YZR-M1 | 20 | (France) Fabio Quartararo | All |
| (Malaysia) Petronas Yamaha SRT | Yamaha | YZR-M1 | 21 | (Italy) Franco Morbidelli | All |

Key
Regular rider
Replacement rider

All teams used series-specified Michelin tyres.

=== Rider changes ===
- Johann Zarco and Red Bull KTM Factory Racing announced midway through the 2019 season that they would end their relationship prematurely. Zarco was originally contracted through the end of 2020. His seat was taken by 2016 Moto3 champion Brad Binder, who moved up to MotoGP from KTM's Moto2 program. Binder was originally slotted to replace Hafizh Syahrin at Red Bull KTM Tech3. Instead, fellow KTM Moto2 rider Iker Lecuona was promoted to the MotoGP class to replace Syahrin, who returned to Moto2.
- Three-time MotoGP World Champion Jorge Lorenzo retired at the conclusion of the 2019 season, after 12 seasons in the premier class. He was replaced at Repsol Honda Team by 2019 Moto2 champion Álex Márquez, alongside his brother Marc Márquez. On 30 January 2020, Jorge Lorenzo was confirmed to be returning to Yamaha as a part of the manufacturer's European testing team. Before the start of the season, Lorenzo confirmed that he would make a wildcard entry for Yamaha at the Catalunya round. Due to the COVID-19 response, wildcard entries were later forbidden to minimize paddock personnel.
- Between the Valencia and Jerez 2019 post-season tests, it was announced that Reale Avintia had elected to prematurely terminate Karel Abraham's contract which would have seen him with the team through the end of 2020. Abraham confirmed his retirement from MotoGP after 8 years in the premier class. Johann Zarco joined Reale Avintia in Karel Abraham's place.
- Andrea Iannone was handed a provisional suspension from all FIM-sanctioned events on 17 December 2019 for a failed doping test after the Malaysian Grand Prix. On 31 March 2020, the FIM International Disciplinary Court upheld the suspension and commuted it to an 18-month ban from the beginning of the provisional suspension. Bradley Smith replaced him beginning with the first 2 rounds of 2020, as Iannone awaited the results of his appeal. By mid-August, Iannone's appeal with the Court of Arbitration for Sport (CAS) was postponed until 15 October, meaning Smith would continue as replacement rider at least until the French Grand Prix. On 15 October, the CAS announced that the final decision would be made by mid-November, casting doubts on any return for Iannone before the season finale on 22 November. On 10 November, the CAS announced its decision to extend Iannone's ban from 18 months to a 4-year period.

==== Mid-season changes ====
- Stefan Bradl replaced Marc Márquez from the Czech Republic round onwards while he recovered from injuries sustained in an opening round crash at the Spanish Grand Prix. Márquez did not return for the remainder of the season.
- Ducati test rider Michele Pirro replaced Francesco Bagnaia in both Austrian rounds while Bagnaia recovered from injuries sustained in a crash during practice at the Czech Republic Grand Prix.
- Valentino Rossi tested positive for the SARS-CoV-2 virus on 15 October, requiring him to quarantine for a minimum of 10 days according to Italian law and forcing him to miss the Aragon and Teruel rounds. Yamaha confirmed that they would not field a replacement for Rossi at the Teruel round on 25 October. After delays to Valentino Rossi's SARS-CoV-2 recovery, Yamaha World Superbike rider Garrett Gerloff was announced initially to replace Rossi at the European Grand Prix. Gerloff completed the Friday sessions of free practice, before two subsequent negative tests from Rossi allowed him to return to the paddock beginning with the third practice session on Saturday.
- Aprilia test rider and former World Superbike rider Lorenzo Savadori was announced to replace Bradley Smith for the final three rounds in Valencia and Portugal, subsequently ruling Andrea Iannone out of a start in 2020.
- Tech3 rider Iker Lecuona was forced to sit out of the European Grand Prix in Valencia, due to Andorran quarantine rules for close contact with individuals who tested positive for the SARS-CoV-2 virus. His brother – with whom he lived in Andorra – and his personal assistant both tested positive for the virus on 3 November, meaning Lecuona was forced into a mandatory quarantine of 10 days minimum. Tech3 elected not to replace him on such short notice. Lecuona also missed the Valencian Grand Prix after he subsequently tested positive for the virus shortly before the beginning of the race weekend, and subsequently the Portuguese Grand Prix on the following weekend. KTM factory test rider Mika Kallio replaced Lecuona in Portugal.

== Calendar ==
The following Grands Prix took place in 2020:

| Round | Date | Grand Prix | Circuit |
|---|---|---|---|
| 1 | 19 July | (Spain) Gran Premio Red Bull de España | Circuito de Jerez, Jerez de la Frontera |
| 2 | 26 July | (Andalusia) Gran Premio Red Bull de Andalucía | Circuito de Jerez, Jerez de la Frontera |
| 3 | 9 August | (Czech Republic) Monster Energy Grand Prix České republiky | Brno Circuit, Brno |
| 4 | 16 August | (Austria) myWorld Motorrad Grand Prix von Österreich | Red Bull Ring, Spielberg |
| 5 | 23 August | BMW M Grand Prix of Styria | Red Bull Ring, Spielberg |
| 6 | 13 September | Gran Premio Lenovo di San Marino e della Riviera di Rimini | Misano World Circuit, Misano Adriatico |
| 7 | 20 September | (Emilia-Romagna) Gran Premio Tissot dell'Emilia Romagna e della Riviera di Rimini | Misano World Circuit, Misano Adriatico |
| 8 | 27 September | (Catalonia) Gran Premi Monster Energy de Catalunya | Circuit de Barcelona-Catalunya, Montmeló |
| 9 | 11 October | Shark Helmets Grand Prix de France | Bugatti Circuit, Le Mans |
| 10 | 18 October | (Aragon) Gran Premio Michelin de Aragón | MotorLand Aragón, Alcañiz |
| 11 | 25 October | (Province of Teruel) Gran Premio Liqui Moly de Teruel | MotorLand Aragón, Alcañiz |
| 12 | 8 November | (Europe) Gran Premio de Europa | Circuit Ricardo Tormo, Valencia |
| 13 | 15 November | (Valencian Community) Gran Premio Motul de la Comunitat Valenciana | Circuit Ricardo Tormo, Valencia |
| 14 | 22 November | Grande Prémio MEO de Portugal | Algarve International Circuit, Portimão |

=== Cancelled Grands Prix ===
The following rounds were included on the original calendar, but were cancelled in response to the COVID-19 pandemic:

| Original Date | Grand Prix | Circuit |
|---|---|---|
| 8 March (Note: Night race) | Qatar motorcycle Grand Prix | Lusail International Circuit, Lusail |
| 31 May | (Italy) Italian motorcycle Grand Prix | Mugello Circuit, Scarperia e San Piero |
| 21 June | (Germany) German motorcycle Grand Prix | Sachsenring, Hohenstein-Ernstthal |
| 28 June | (Netherlands) Dutch TT | TT Circuit Assen, Assen |
| 12 July | (Finland) Finnish motorcycle Grand Prix | Kymi Ring, Iitti |
| 30 August | (United Kingdom) British motorcycle Grand Prix | Silverstone Circuit, Silverstone |
| ~~22 March~~; 4 October (Note: The Thailand Grand Prix was originally due to take place on 22 March but was initially rescheduled to 4 October due to the COVID-19 pandemic.) | Thailand motorcycle Grand Prix | Buriram International Circuit, Buriram |
| 18 October | (Japan) Japanese motorcycle Grand Prix | Motegi Circuit, Motegi |
| 25 October | (Australia) Australian motorcycle Grand Prix | Phillip Island Grand Prix Circuit, Phillip Island |
| 1 November | (Malaysia) Malaysian motorcycle Grand Prix | Sepang International Circuit, Sepang |
| ~~5 April~~; 15 November (Note: The Grand Prix of the Americas was originally due to take place on 5 April but was initially rescheduled to 15 November due to the COVID-19 pandemic.) | (United States) Motorcycle Grand Prix of the Americas | Circuit of the Americas, Austin |
| ~~19 April~~; 22 November (Note: The Argentine Grand Prix was originally due to take place on 19 April but was initially rescheduled to 22 November due to the COVID-19 pandemic.) | (Argentina) Argentine Republic motorcycle Grand Prix | Autódromo Termas de Río Hondo, Termas de Río Hondo |

=== Calendar changes ===
- The Finnish Grand Prix was planned to be reintroduced to the calendar after a 38-year absence. The venue hosting the round was planned to be the new Kymi Ring, instead of the Pyynikki Circuit used in 1962 and 1963 or the Imatra Circuit which hosted the round until 1982.
- The Aragon Grand Prix was moved from the last week of September to the first week of October. It was later returned to its original schedule to allow for the rescheduled Thailand Grand Prix.

==== Calendar changes as a reaction to COVID-19 pandemic ====
The season calendar was significantly affected by the COVID-19 pandemic, leading to the cancellation or postponement of many races and an overall delay to the start of the season.

- The Qatar Grand Prix, originally scheduled to be the first round, was cancelled after Qatari quarantine measures were put in place. Travelers coming from Italy or having recently been in Italy would be required to quarantine for two weeks, creating difficulties for the many teams, riders, and suppliers based in Italy. However, the Moto2 and Moto3 races proceeded as planned, as the teams and riders were already in Qatar for their final pre-season test before the quarantine measures were implemented.
- The Thailand Grand Prix was postponed on 2 March due to COVID-19 concerns. It was later planned to take place on 4 October, shifting the Aragon Grand Prix forward by a week.
- The Grand Prix of the Americas was postponed from 5 April to 15 November after the City of Austin implemented a state of emergency. The Valencian Grand Prix was subsequently shifted back by one week to 22 November to accommodate the Austin rescheduling.
- The Argentine Grand Prix was postponed to 22 November, further shifting the finale in Valencia to 29 November.
- The Spanish Grand Prix was postponed on 26 March.
- The French Grand Prix was postponed on 2 April.
- The Italian and Catalan Grands Prix were postponed on 7 April.
- The German Grand Prix was postponed on 17 April after the German government announced a ban of all large gatherings until at least 31 August.
- The Dutch TT was postponed on 23 April after the Dutch government announced a ban on all mass events until at least 1 September.
- The Finnish Grand Prix was postponed on 24 April.
- The German, Dutch, and Finnish rounds were officially cancelled on 29 April. For the first time in the championship's history, the Dutch TT was absent from the calendar.
- The British and Australian rounds were cancelled on 29 May.
- The Japanese round was cancelled on 1 June.
- The Italian round was officially cancelled on 10 June.
- On 11 June, a new schedule based solely within Europe was announced. The season would contain 5 "double-headers" on consecutive weekends at Jerez, Austria, Misano, Aragon, and Valencia to achieve a minimum of 13 races.
- The European Grand Prix returned to the calendar for the first time since 1995, held at Circuit Ricardo Tormo as the first round of the Valencian double-header.
- The Grand Prix of the Americas was officially cancelled on 8 July.
- The Argentine, Thai, and Malaysian rounds were officially cancelled on 31 July.
- On 10 August, the Portuguese Grand Prix was announced to be staging the final race of the 2020 season at the Algarve International Circuit in Portimão. It marked the first Portuguese Grand Prix since 2012, when it was held at the Circuito do Estoril. Portimão has been MotoGP's reserve track since 2017. It also marked the first time since 2001 that the season finale was not held in Valencia.

== Results and standings ==
=== Grands Prix ===
| Round | Grand Prix | Pole position | Fastest lap | Winning rider | Winning team | Winning constructor | Report |
|---|---|---|---|---|---|---|---|
| 1 | (Spain) Spanish motorcycle Grand Prix | (France) Fabio Quartararo | (Spain) Marc Márquez | (France) Fabio Quartararo | (Malaysia) Petronas Yamaha SRT | (Japan) Yamaha | Report |
| 2 | (Andalusia) Andalusian motorcycle Grand Prix | (France) Fabio Quartararo | (France) Fabio Quartararo | (France) Fabio Quartararo | (Malaysia) Petronas Yamaha SRT | (Japan) Yamaha | Report |
| 3 | Czech Republic motorcycle Grand Prix | (France) Johann Zarco | (South Africa) Brad Binder | (South Africa) Brad Binder | (Austria) Red Bull KTM Factory Racing | (Austria) KTM | Report |
| 4 | (Austria) Austrian motorcycle Grand Prix | (Spain) Maverick Viñales | (Spain) Álex Rins | (Italy) Andrea Dovizioso | (Italy) Ducati Team | (Italy) Ducati | Report |
| 5 | (Styria) Styrian motorcycle Grand Prix | (Spain) Pol Espargaró | (Spain) Pol Espargaró | (Portugal) Miguel Oliveira | (France) Red Bull KTM Tech3 | (Austria) KTM | Report |
| 6 | San Marino and Rimini Riviera motorcycle Grand Prix | (Spain) Maverick Viñales | (Italy) Francesco Bagnaia | (Italy) Franco Morbidelli | (Malaysia) Petronas Yamaha SRT | (Japan) Yamaha | Report |
| 7 | (Emilia-Romagna) Emilia Romagna and Rimini Riviera motorcycle Grand Prix | (Spain) Maverick Viñales | (Italy) Francesco Bagnaia | (Spain) Maverick Viñales | (Japan) Monster Energy Yamaha MotoGP | (Japan) Yamaha | Report |
| 8 | (Catalonia) Catalan motorcycle Grand Prix | (Italy) Franco Morbidelli | (France) Fabio Quartararo | (France) Fabio Quartararo | (Malaysia) Petronas Yamaha SRT | (Japan) Yamaha | Report |
| 9 | (France) French motorcycle Grand Prix | (France) Fabio Quartararo | (France) Johann Zarco | (Italy) Danilo Petrucci | (Italy) Ducati Team | (Italy) Ducati | Report |
| 10 | Aragon motorcycle Grand Prix | (France) Fabio Quartararo | (Spain) Álex Rins | (Spain) Álex Rins | (Japan) Team Suzuki Ecstar | (Japan) Suzuki | Report |
| 11 | (Province of Teruel) Teruel motorcycle Grand Prix | (Japan) Takaaki Nakagami | (Italy) Franco Morbidelli | (Italy) Franco Morbidelli | (Malaysia) Petronas Yamaha SRT | (Japan) Yamaha | Report |
| 12 | (Europe) European motorcycle Grand Prix | (Spain) Pol Espargaró | (South Africa) Brad Binder | (Spain) Joan Mir | (Japan) Team Suzuki Ecstar | (Japan) Suzuki | Report |
| 13 | Valencian Community motorcycle Grand Prix | (Italy) Franco Morbidelli | (Australia) Jack Miller | (Italy) Franco Morbidelli | (Malaysia) Petronas Yamaha SRT | (Japan) Yamaha | Report |
| 14 | (Portugal) Portuguese motorcycle Grand Prix | (Portugal) Miguel Oliveira | (Portugal) Miguel Oliveira | (Portugal) Miguel Oliveira | (France) Red Bull KTM Tech3 | (Austria) KTM | Report |

=== Riders' standings ===
Scoring system

Points were awarded to the top fifteen finishers. A rider had to finish the race to earn points.

| Position | 1st | 2nd | 3rd | 4th | 5th | 6th | 7th | 8th | 9th | 10th | 11th | 12th | 13th | 14th | 15th |
| Points | 25 | 20 | 16 | 13 | 11 | 10 | 9 | 8 | 7 | 6 | 5 | 4 | 3 | 2 | 1 |

| Pos. | Rider | Bike | Team | SPA (Spain) | ANC (Andalusia) | CZE (Czech Republic) | AUT (Austria) | STY (Styria) | RSM (San Marino) | EMI (Emilia-Romagna) | CAT (Catalonia) | FRA (France) | ARA (Aragon) | TER (Province of Teruel) | EUR (Europe) | VAL (Valencian Community) | POR (Portugal) | Pts |
|---|---|---|---|---|---|---|---|---|---|---|---|---|---|---|---|---|---|---|
| 1 | (Spain) Joan Mir | Suzuki | Team Suzuki Ecstar | Ret | 5 | Ret | 2 | 4 | 3 | 2 | 2 | 11 | 3 | 3 | 1 | 7 | Ret | 171 |
| 2 | (Italy) Franco Morbidelli | Yamaha | Petronas Yamaha SRT | 5 | Ret | 2 | Ret | 15 | 1 | 9 | 4^{P} | Ret | 6 | 1^{F} | 11 | 1^{P} | 3 | 158 |
| 3 | (Spain) Álex Rins | Suzuki | Team Suzuki Ecstar | DNS | 10 | 4 | Ret^{F} | 6 | 5 | 12 | 3 | NC | 1^{F} | 2 | 2 | 4 | 15 | 139 |
| 4 | (Italy) Andrea Dovizioso | Ducati | Ducati Team | 3 | 6 | 11 | 1 | 5 | 7 | 8 | Ret | 4 | 7 | 13 | 8 | 8 | 6 | 135 |
| 5 | (Spain) Pol Espargaró | KTM | Red Bull KTM Factory Racing | 6 | 7 | Ret | Ret | 3^{P F} | 10 | 3 | Ret | 3 | 12 | 4 | 3^{P} | 3 | 4 | 135 |
| 6 | (Spain) Maverick Viñales | Yamaha | Monster Energy Yamaha MotoGP | 2 | 2 | 14 | 10^{P} | Ret | 6^{P} | 1^{P} | 9 | 10 | 4 | 7 | 13 | 10 | 11 | 132 |
| 7 | (Australia) Jack Miller | Ducati | Pramac Racing | 4 | Ret | 9 | 3 | 2 | 8 | Ret | 5 | Ret | 9 | Ret | 6 | 2^{F} | 2 | 132 |
| 8 | (France) Fabio Quartararo | Yamaha | Petronas Yamaha SRT | 1^{P} | 1^{P F} | 7 | 8 | 13 | Ret | 4 | 1^{F} | 9^{P} | 18^{P} | 8 | 14 | Ret | 14 | 127 |
| 9 | (Portugal) Miguel Oliveira | KTM | Red Bull KTM Tech3 | 8 | Ret | 6 | Ret | 1 | 11 | 5 | Ret | 6 | 16 | 6 | 5 | 6 | 1^{P F} | 125 |
| 10 | (Japan) Takaaki Nakagami | Honda | LCR Honda Idemitsu | 10 | 4 | 8 | 6 | 7 | 9 | 6 | 7 | 7 | 5 | Ret^{P} | 4 | Ret | 5 | 116 |
| 11 | (South Africa) Brad Binder | KTM | Red Bull KTM Factory Racing | 13 | Ret | 1^{F} | 4 | 8 | 12 | Ret | 11 | 12 | 11 | Ret | 7^{F} | 5 | Ret | 87 |
| 12 | (Italy) Danilo Petrucci | Ducati | Ducati Team | 9 | Ret | 12 | 7 | 11 | 16 | 10 | 8 | 1 | 15 | 10 | 10 | 15 | 16 | 78 |
| 13 | (France) Johann Zarco | Ducati | Esponsorama Racing | 11 | 9 | 3^{P} | Ret | 14 | 15 | 11 | Ret | 5^{F} | 10 | 5 | 9 | Ret | 10 | 77 |
| 14 | (Spain) Álex Márquez | Honda | Repsol Honda Team | 12 | 8 | 15 | 14 | 16 | 17 | 7 | 13 | 2 | 2 | Ret | Ret | 16 | 9 | 74 |
| 15 | (Italy) Valentino Rossi | Yamaha | Monster Energy Yamaha MotoGP | Ret | 3 | 5 | 5 | 9 | 4 | Ret | Ret | Ret | | | Ret | 12 | 12 | 66 |
| 16 | (Italy) Francesco Bagnaia | Ducati | Pramac Racing | 7 | Ret | DNS | | | 2^{F} | Ret^{F} | 6 | 13 | Ret | Ret | Ret | 11 | Ret | 47 |
| 17 | (Spain) Aleix Espargaró | Aprilia | Aprilia Racing Team Gresini | Ret | Ret | 10 | 11 | 12 | 13 | Ret | 12 | 14 | 13 | Ret | Ret | 9 | 8 | 42 |
| 18 | (United Kingdom) Cal Crutchlow | Honda | LCR Honda Castrol | DNS | 13 | 13 | 15 | 17 | DNS | | 10 | Ret | 8 | 11 | Ret | 13 | 13 | 32 |
| 19 | (Germany) Stefan Bradl | Honda | Repsol Honda Team | | | 18 | 17 | 18 | 18 | DNS | 17 | 8 | 17 | 12 | 12 | 14 | 7 | 27 |
| 20 | (Spain) Iker Lecuona | KTM | Red Bull KTM Tech3 | Ret | Ret | Ret | 9 | 10 | 14 | Ret | 14 | 15 | 14 | 9 | | WD | | 27 |
| 21 | (United Kingdom) Bradley Smith | Aprilia | Aprilia Racing Team Gresini | 15 | 12 | 17 | 13 | 19 | 19 | 13 | 16 | Ret | 19 | 15 | | | | 12 |
| 22 | (Spain) Tito Rabat | Ducati | Esponsorama Racing | 14 | 11 | 16 | 16 | 21 | Ret | Ret | 15 | Ret | 20 | 14 | Ret | 17 | 18 | 10 |
| 23 | (Italy) Michele Pirro | Ducati | Pramac Racing | | | | 12 | 20 | | | | | | | | | | 4 |
| 24 | (Finland) Mika Kallio | KTM | Red Bull KTM Tech3 | | | | | | | | | | | | | | 17 | 0 |
| 25 | (Italy) Lorenzo Savadori | Aprilia | Aprilia Racing Team Gresini | | | | | | | | | | | | Ret | 18 | Ret | 0 |
| | (Spain) Marc Márquez | Honda | Repsol Honda Team | Ret^{F} | DNS | | | | | | | | | | | | | 0 |
| | (United States) Garrett Gerloff | Yamaha | Monster Energy Yamaha MotoGP | | | | | | | | | | | | WD | | | 0 |
| Pos. | Rider | Bike | Team | SPA (Spain) | ANC (Andalusia) | CZE (Czech Republic) | AUT (Austria) | STY (Styria) | RSM (San Marino) | EMI (Emilia-Romagna) | CAT (Catalonia) | FRA (France) | ARA (Aragon) | TER (Province of Teruel) | EUR (Europe) | VAL (Valencian Community) | POR (Portugal) | Pts |

Race key
| Colour | Result |
|---|---|
| Gold | Winner |
| Silver | 2nd place |
| Bronze | 3rd place |
| Green | Points finish |
| Blue | Non-points finish |
| Blue | Non-classified finish (NC) |
| Purple | Retired (Ret) |
| Red | Did not qualify (DNQ) |
| Black | Disqualified (DSQ) |
| White | Did not start (DNS) |
| White | Withdrew (WD) |
| White | Race cancelled (C) |
| Blank | Did not practice (DNP) |
| Blank | Excluded (EX) |
| Blank | Did not arrive (DNA) |
| Blank | Did not enter (empty cell) |
| Annotation | Meaning |
| P | Pole position |
| F | Fastest lap |
Rider key
| Colour | Meaning |
| Light blue | Rookie rider |

=== Constructors' standings ===
Each constructor received the same number of points as their best placed rider in each race.

| Pos. | Constructor | SPA (Spain) | ANC (Andalusia) | CZE (Czech Republic) | AUT (Austria) | STY (Styria) | RSM (San Marino) | EMI (Emilia-Romagna) | CAT (Catalonia) | FRA (France) | ARA (Aragon) | TER (Province of Teruel) | EUR (Europe) | VAL (Valencian Community) | POR (Portugal) | Pts |
|---|---|---|---|---|---|---|---|---|---|---|---|---|---|---|---|---|
| 1 | (Italy) Ducati | 3 | 6 | 3 | 1 | 2 | 2 | 8 | 5 | 1 | 7 | 5 | 6 | 2 | 2 | 221 |
| 2 | (Japan) Yamaha | 1 | 1 | 2 | 5 | 9 | 1 | 1 | 1 | 9 | 4 | 1 | 11 | 1 | 3 | 204 (Note: Yamaha scored 254 points as a manufacturer, but were deducted 50 points after failing to respect MSMA technical changes protocols.) |
| 3 | (Japan) Suzuki | Ret | 5 | 4 | 2 | 4 | 3 | 2 | 2 | 11 | 1 | 2 | 1 | 4 | 15 | 202 |
| 4 | (Austria) KTM | 6 | 7 | 1 | 4 | 1 | 10 | 3 | 11 | 3 | 11 | 4 | 3 | 3 | 1 | 200 |
| 5 | (Japan) Honda | 10 | 4 | 8 | 6 | 7 | 9 | 6 | 7 | 2 | 2 | 11 | 4 | 13 | 5 | 144 |
| 6 | (Italy) Aprilia | 15 | 12 | 10 | 11 | 12 | 13 | 13 | 12 | 14 | 13 | 15 | Ret | 9 | 8 | 51 |
| Pos. | Constructor | SPA (Spain) | ANC (Andalusia) | CZE (Czech Republic) | AUT (Austria) | STY (Styria) | RSM (San Marino) | EMI (Emilia-Romagna) | CAT (Catalonia) | FRA (France) | ARA (Aragon) | TER (Province of Teruel) | EUR (Europe) | VAL (Valencian Community) | POR (Portugal) | Pts |

=== Teams' standings ===
The teams' standings were based on results obtained by regular and substitute riders.

| Pos. | Team | Bike No. | SPA (Spain) | ANC (Andalusia) | CZE (Czech Republic) | AUT (Austria) | STY (Styria) | RSM (San Marino) | EMI (Emilia-Romagna) | CAT (Catalonia) | FRA (France) | ARA (Aragon) | TER (Province of Teruel) | EUR (Europe) | VAL (Valencian Community) | POR (Portugal) | Pts |
|---|---|---|---|---|---|---|---|---|---|---|---|---|---|---|---|---|---|
| 1 | (Japan) Team Suzuki Ecstar | 36 | Ret | 5 | Ret | 2 | 4 | 3 | 2 | 2 | 11 | 3 | 3 | 1 | 7 | Ret | 310 |
| 1 | (Japan) Team Suzuki Ecstar | 42 | DNS | 10 | 4 | Ret^{F} | 6 | 5 | 12 | 3 | NC | 1^{F} | 2 | 2 | 4 | 15 | 310 |
| 2 | (Malaysia) Petronas Yamaha SRT | 20 | 1^{P} | 1^{P F} | 7 | 8 | 13 | Ret | 4 | 1^{F} | 9^{P} | 18^{P} | 8 | 14 | Ret | 14 | 248 (Note: Petronas Yamaha SRT riders scored 285 points, but the team was deducted 37 points after failing to respect MSMA technical changes protocols.) |
| 2 | (Malaysia) Petronas Yamaha SRT | 21 | 5 | Ret | 2 | Ret | 15 | 1 | 9 | 4^{P} | Ret | 6 | 1^{F} | 11 | 1^{P} | 3 | 248 |
| 3 | (Austria) Red Bull KTM Factory Racing | 33 | 13 | Ret | 1^{F} | 4 | 8 | 12 | Ret | 11 | 12 | 11 | Ret | 7^{F} | 5 | Ret | 222 |
| 3 | (Austria) Red Bull KTM Factory Racing | 44 | 6 | 7 | Ret | Ret | 3^{P F} | 10 | 3 | Ret | 3 | 12 | 4 | 3^{P} | 3 | 4 | 222 |
| 4 | (Italy) Ducati Team | 04 | 3 | 6 | 11 | 1 | 5 | 7 | 8 | Ret | 4 | 7 | 13 | 8 | 8 | 6 | 213 |
| 4 | (Italy) Ducati Team | 9 | 9 | Ret | 12 | 7 | 11 | 16 | 10 | 8 | 1 | 15 | 10 | 10 | 15 | 16 | 213 |
| 5 | (Italy) Pramac Racing | 43 | 4 | Ret | 9 | 3 | 2 | 8 | Ret | 5 | Ret | 9 | Ret | 6 | 2^{F} | 2 | 183 |
| 5 | (Italy) Pramac Racing | 51 | | | | 12 | 20 | | | | | | | | | | 183 |
| 5 | (Italy) Pramac Racing | 63 | 7 | Ret | DNS | | | 2^{F} | Ret^{F} | 6 | 13 | Ret | Ret | Ret | 11 | Ret | 183 |
| 6 | (Japan) Monster Energy Yamaha MotoGP | 12 | 2 | 2 | 14 | 10^{P} | Ret | 6^{P} | 1^{P} | 9 | 10 | 4 | 7 | 13 | 10 | 11 | 178 (Note: Monster Energy Yamaha MotoGP riders scored 198 points, but the team was deducted 20 points after failing to respect MSMA technical changes protocols.) |
| 6 | (Japan) Monster Energy Yamaha MotoGP | 31 | | | | | | | | | | | | WD | | | 178 |
| 6 | (Japan) Monster Energy Yamaha MotoGP | 46 | Ret | 3 | 5 | 5 | 9 | 4 | Ret | Ret | Ret | | | Ret | 12 | 12 | 178 |
| 7 | (France) Red Bull KTM Tech3 | 27 | Ret | Ret | Ret | 9 | 10 | 14 | Ret | 14 | 15 | 14 | 9 | | WD | | 152 |
| 7 | (France) Red Bull KTM Tech3 | 82 | | | | | | | | | | | | | | 17 | 152 |
| 7 | (France) Red Bull KTM Tech3 | 88 | 8 | Ret | 6 | Ret | 1 | 11 | 5 | Ret | 6 | 16 | 6 | 5 | 6 | 1^{P F} | 152 |
| 8 | (Monaco) LCR Honda | 30 | 10 | 4 | 8 | 6 | 7 | 9 | 6 | 7 | 7 | 5 | Ret^{P} | 4 | Ret | 5 | 148 |
| 8 | (Monaco) LCR Honda | 35 | DNS | 13 | 13 | 15 | 17 | DNS | | 10 | Ret | 8 | 11 | Ret | 13 | 13 | 148 |
| 9 | (Japan) Repsol Honda Team | 6 | | | 18 | 17 | 18 | 18 | DNS | 17 | 8 | 17 | 12 | 12 | 14 | 7 | 101 |
| 9 | (Japan) Repsol Honda Team | 73 | 12 | 8 | 15 | 14 | 16 | 17 | 7 | 13 | 2 | 2 | Ret | Ret | 16 | 9 | 101 |
| 9 | (Japan) Repsol Honda Team | 93 | Ret^{F} | DNS | | | | | | | | | | | | | 101 |
| 10 | (Spain) Esponsorama Racing | 5 | 11 | 9 | 3^{P} | Ret | 14 | 15 | 11 | Ret | 5^{F} | 10 | 5 | 9 | Ret | 10 | 87 |
| 10 | (Spain) Esponsorama Racing | 53 | 14 | 11 | 16 | 16 | 21 | Ret | Ret | 15 | Ret | 20 | 14 | Ret | 17 | 18 | 87 |
| 11 | (Italy) Aprilia Racing Team Gresini | 32 | | | | | | | | | | | | Ret | 18 | Ret | 54 |
| 11 | (Italy) Aprilia Racing Team Gresini | 38 | 15 | 12 | 17 | 13 | 19 | 19 | 13 | 16 | Ret | 19 | 15 | | | | 54 |
| 11 | (Italy) Aprilia Racing Team Gresini | 41 | Ret | Ret | 10 | 11 | 12 | 13 | Ret | 12 | 14 | 13 | Ret | Ret | 9 | 8 | 54 |
| Pos. | Team | Bike No. | SPA (Spain) | ANC (Andalusia) | CZE (Czech Republic) | AUT (Austria) | STY (Styria) | RSM (San Marino) | EMI (Emilia-Romagna) | CAT (Catalonia) | FRA (France) | ARA (Aragon) | TER (Province of Teruel) | EUR (Europe) | VAL (Valencian Community) | POR (Portugal) | Pts |
