= 2020 Aragon motorcycle Grand Prix =

2020 Aragon Grand Prix
Race details
- Race 11 of 15 races in the 2020 Grand Prix motorcycle racing season
- Date: 18 October 2020
- Official name: Gran Premio Michelin de Aragón
- Location: MotorLand Aragón; Alcañiz, Spain
- Course: Permanent racing facility; 5.077 km (3.155 mi)

MotoGP
Pole position
Rider	(France) Fabio Quartararo	Yamaha
Time	1:47.076	
Fastest lap
Rider	(Spain) Álex Rins	Suzuki
Time	1:48.404 on lap 3	
Podium
First	(Spain) Álex Rins	Suzuki
Second	(Spain) Álex Márquez	Honda
Third	(Spain) Joan Mir	Suzuki

Moto2
Pole position
Rider	(United Kingdom) Sam Lowes	Kalex
Time	1:51.651	
Fastest lap
Rider	(Spain) Jorge Martín	Kalex
Time	1:52.081 on lap 2	
Podium
First	(United Kingdom) Sam Lowes	Kalex
Second	(Italy) Enea Bastianini	Kalex
Third	(Spain) Jorge Martín	Kalex

Moto3
Pole position
Rider	(Spain) Raúl Fernández	KTM
Time	1:57.681	
Fastest lap
Rider	(South Africa) Darryn Binder	KTM
Time	1:58.070 on lap 5	
Podium
First	(Spain) Jaume Masiá	Honda
Second	(South Africa) Darryn Binder	KTM
Third	(Spain) Raúl Fernández	KTM

The 2020 Aragon motorcycle Grand Prix (officially known as the Gran Premio Michelin de Aragón) was the eleventh round of the 2020 Grand Prix motorcycle racing season and the tenth round of the 2020 MotoGP World Championship. It was held at the MotorLand Aragón in Alcañiz on 18 October 2020.

== Background ==
=== Impact of the COVID-19 pandemic ===
The opening rounds of the 2020 championship have been heavily affected by the COVID-19 pandemic. The Aragon Grand Prix, scheduled in the original calendar on October 4 as the sixteenth race of the season, was brought forward by a week following the initial postponement of the Thailand Grand Prix (later cancelled on July 31) on the first Sunday in October (the Thailand stage was initially scheduled for 22 March as the second leg of the championship). Several Grands Prix were cancelled or postponed after the aborted opening round in Qatar, prompting the Fédération Internationale de Motocyclisme to draft a new calendar. A new calendar based exclusively in Europe was announced on 11 June. The race in Aragon was placed on 18 October as the tenth GP of the season.

=== MotoGP Championship standings before the race ===
After the ninth round at the 2020 French Grand Prix, Fabio Quartararo leads the drivers' championship with 115 points, with a 5-point advantage over Joan Mir. Andrea Dovizioso is third with 97 points, one more than Maverick Viñales, while Takaaki Nakagami is fifth with 81 points.

In the manufacturers' standings, Yamaha leads with 170 points, ahead of Ducati with 151 points. KTM is third with 125 points, seven more than Suzuki. Honda is fifth with 99 points and Aprilia closes the standings with 32 points.

In the team championship, Petronas Yamaha SRT is first with 196 points, followed by Team Suzuki Ecstar and Ducati Team with 165 and 161 points respectively. Monster Energy Yamaha is fourth with 154 points, KTM Factory Racing is fifth with 135 points.

=== MotoGP Entrants ===
- Stefan Bradl replaced Marc Márquez for the eighth straight race while he recovered from injuries sustained in his opening round crash.
- Valentino Rossi tested positive for the SARS-CoV-2 virus on 15 October, requiring him to quarantine for a minimum of 10 days according to Italian law and forcing him to miss the Aragon and Teruel rounds. Yamaha confirmed that they would not field a replacement for Rossi at the Teruel round on 25 October.
- As Rossi and Marc Márquez missed the race, it was the first time since the 1999 Rio de Janeiro Grand Prix that no current or former premier class champion lined up on the grid.

== Free practice ==
=== MotoGP ===
In the first session Maverick Viñales was the fastest ahead of Franco Morbidelli and Fabio Quartararo. The Spaniard confirmed his first position in the second session, while the Petronas Yamaha SRT bikers swapped positions. In the third session Morbidelli was the fastest ahead of Cal Crutchlow and Pol Espargaró.

== Race ==
=== MotoGP ===
Pos.	No.	Rider	Team	Manufacturer	Laps	Time/Retired	Grid	Points
1	42	(Spain) Álex Rins	Team Suzuki Ecstar	Suzuki	23	41:54.391	10	25
2	73	(Spain) Álex Márquez	Repsol Honda Team	Honda	23	+0.263	11	20
3	36	(Spain) Joan Mir	Team Suzuki Ecstar	Suzuki	23	+2.644	6	16
4	12	(Spain) Maverick Viñales	Monster Energy Yamaha MotoGP	Yamaha	23	+2.880	2	13
5	30	(Japan) Takaaki Nakagami	LCR Honda Idemitsu	Honda	23	+4.570	7	11
6	21	(Italy) Franco Morbidelli	Petronas Yamaha SRT	Yamaha	23	+4.756	4	10
7	4	(Italy) Andrea Dovizioso	Ducati Team	Ducati	23	+8.639	13	9
8	35	(United Kingdom) Cal Crutchlow	LCR Honda Castrol	Honda	23	+8.913	3	8
9	43	(Australia) Jack Miller	Pramac Racing	Ducati	23	+9.390	5	7
10	5	(France) Johann Zarco	Esponsorama Racing	Ducati	23	+9.617	16	6
11	33	(South Africa) Brad Binder	Red Bull KTM Factory Racing	KTM	23	+13.200	14	5
12	44	(Spain) Pol Espargaró	Red Bull KTM Factory Racing	KTM	23	+13.689	12	4
13	41	(Spain) Aleix Espargaró	Aprilia Racing Team Gresini	Aprilia	23	+14.598	9	3
14	27	(Spain) Iker Lecuona	Red Bull KTM Tech3	KTM	23	+15.291	15	2
15	9	(Italy) Danilo Petrucci	Ducati Team	Ducati	23	+15.941	8	1
16	88	(Portugal) Miguel Oliveira	Red Bull KTM Tech3	KTM	23	+18.284	18	
17	6	(Germany) Stefan Bradl	Repsol Honda Team	Honda	23	+20.136	21	
18	20	(France) Fabio Quartararo	Petronas Yamaha SRT	Yamaha	23	+21.498	1	
19	38	(United Kingdom) Bradley Smith	Aprilia Racing Team Gresini	Aprilia	23	+25.300	19	
20	53	(Spain) Tito Rabat	Esponsorama Racing	Ducati	23	+25.558	20	
Ret	63	(Italy) Francesco Bagnaia	Pramac Racing	Ducati	2	Accident	17	
Fastest lap: (Spain) Álex Rins (Suzuki) – 1:48.404 (lap 3)

=== Moto2 ===
Pos.	No.	Rider	Manufacturer	Laps	Time/Retired	Grid	Points
1	22	(United Kingdom) Sam Lowes	Kalex	21	39:33.202	1	25
2	33	(Italy) Enea Bastianini	Kalex	21	+4.195	12	20
3	88	(Spain) Jorge Martín	Kalex	21	+4.340	8	16
4	96	(United Kingdom) Jake Dixon	Kalex	21	+9.298	4	13
5	87	(Australia) Remy Gardner	Kalex	21	+14.765	10	11
6	42	(Spain) Marcos Ramírez	Kalex	21	+15.130	5	10
7	40	(Spain) Héctor Garzó	Kalex	21	+15.192	15	9
8	16	(United States) Joe Roberts	Kalex	21	+17.024	11	8
9	45	(Japan) Tetsuta Nagashima	Kalex	21	+19.000	14	7
10	24	(Italy) Simone Corsi	MV Agusta	21	+20.206	18	6
11	37	(Spain) Augusto Fernández	Kalex	21	+22.661	9	5
12	12	(Switzerland) Thomas Lüthi	Kalex	21	+22.692	13	4
13	57	(Spain) Edgar Pons	Kalex	21	+22.995	16	3
14	62	(Italy) Stefano Manzi	MV Agusta	21	+23.301	23	2
15	23	(Germany) Marcel Schrötter	Kalex	21	+23.989	22	1
16	97	(Spain) Xavi Vierge	Kalex	21	+26.747	20	
17	19	(Italy) Lorenzo Dalla Porta	Kalex	21	+26.862	24	
18	11	(Italy) Nicolò Bulega	Kalex	21	+27.686	26	
19	55	(Malaysia) Hafizh Syahrin	Speed Up	21	+27.761	19	
20	7	(Italy) Lorenzo Baldassarri	Kalex	21	+27.892	21	
21	64	(Netherlands) Bo Bendsneyder	NTS	21	+36.250	17	
22	27	(Indonesia) Andi Farid Izdihar	Kalex	21	+44.779	27	
23	35	(Thailand) Somkiat Chantra	Kalex	21	+45.687	25	
24	18	(Andorra) Xavi Cardelús	Speed Up	21	+47.231	28	
25	99	(Malaysia) Kasma Daniel	Kalex	21	+58.178	30	
26	74	(Poland) Piotr Biesiekirski	NTS	21	+1:05.154	29	
27	9	(Spain) Jorge Navarro	Speed Up	18	+3 laps	6	
Ret	72	(Italy) Marco Bezzecchi	Kalex	19	Accident	2	
Ret	21	(Italy) Fabio Di Giannantonio	Speed Up	10	Accident	3	
Ret	10	(Italy) Luca Marini	Kalex	2	Accident	7	
OFFICIAL MOTO2 RACE REPORT

=== Moto3 ===
Pos.	No.	Rider	Manufacturer	Laps	Time/Retired	Grid	Points
1	5	(Spain) Jaume Masiá	Honda	19	37:45.009	17	25
2	40	(South Africa) Darryn Binder	KTM	19	+0.091	11	20
3	25	(Spain) Raúl Fernández	KTM	19	+0.196	1	16
4	55	(Italy) Romano Fenati	Husqvarna	19	+0.327	6	13
5	17	(United Kingdom) John McPhee	Honda	19	+0.368	10	11
6	52	(Spain) Jeremy Alcoba	Honda	19	+0.385	16	10
7	75	(Spain) Albert Arenas	KTM	19	+0.396	3	9
8	24	(Japan) Tatsuki Suzuki	Honda	19	+1.933	5	8
9	13	(Italy) Celestino Vietti	KTM	19	+2.389	2	7
10	7	(Italy) Dennis Foggia	Honda	19	+2.461	20	6
11	27	(Japan) Kaito Toba	KTM	19	+2.966	19	5
12	99	(Spain) Carlos Tatay	KTM	19	+3.020	7	4
13	71	(Japan) Ayumu Sasaki	KTM	19	+4.872	18	3
14	79	(Japan) Ai Ogura	Honda	19	+10.949	8	2
15	53	(Turkey) Deniz Öncü	KTM	19	+10.979	15	1
16	12	(Czech Republic) Filip Salač	Honda	19	+11.172	22	
17	21	(Spain) Alonso López	Husqvarna	19	+13.861	4	
18	23	(Italy) Niccolò Antonelli	Honda	19	+19.761	12	
19	11	(Spain) Sergio García	Honda	19	+21.284	14	
20	92	(Japan) Yuki Kunii	Honda	19	+21.339	25	
21	54	(Italy) Riccardo Rossi	KTM	19	+21.379	27	
22	50	(Switzerland) Jason Dupasquier	KTM	19	+21.440	23	
23	82	(Italy) Stefano Nepa	KTM	19	+21.520	24	
24	6	(Japan) Ryusei Yamanaka	Honda	19	+36.570	30	
25	70	(Belgium) Barry Baltus	KTM	19	+36.628	29	
26	9	(Italy) Davide Pizzoli	KTM	19	+36.676	26	
27	89	(Malaysia) Khairul Idham Pawi	Honda	19	+36.739	28	
Ret	73	(Austria) Maximilian Kofler	KTM	17	Accident	21	
Ret	16	(Italy) Andrea Migno	KTM	8	Accident	13	
Ret	2	(Argentina) Gabriel Rodrigo	Honda	0	Accident	9	
OFFICIAL MOTO3 RACE REPORT

== Championship standings after the race ==
Below are the standings for the top five riders, constructors, and teams after the round.

=== MotoGP ===
Riders' Championship standings

	Pos.	Rider	Points
1	1	(Spain) Joan Mir	121
1	2	(France) Fabio Quartararo	115
1	3	(Spain) Maverick Viñales	109
1	4	(Italy) Andrea Dovizioso	106
	5	(Japan) Takaaki Nakagami	92

Constructors' Championship standings

	Pos.	Constructor	Points
	1	(Italy) Ducati	160
2	2	(Japan) Suzuki	143
	3	(Japan) Yamaha	133 (Note: Yamaha scored 183 points as a manufacturer, but were deducted 50 points after failing to respect MSMA technical changes protocols.)
2	4	(Austria) KTM	130
	5	(Japan) Honda	112

Teams' Championship standings

	Pos.	Team	Points
	1	(Japan) Team Suzuki Ecstar	206
	2	(Italy) Ducati Team	171
	3	(Malaysia) Petronas Yamaha SRT	165 (Note: Petronas Yamaha SRT riders scored 202 points, but the team was deducted 37 points after failing to respect MSMA technical changes protocols.)
1	4	(Japan) Monster Energy Yamaha MotoGP	147 (Note: Monster Energy Yamaha MotoGP riders scored 167 points, but the team was deducted 20 points after failing to respect MSMA technical changes protocols.)
1	5	(Austria) Red Bull KTM Factory Racing	144

=== Moto2 ===
Riders' Championship standings

	Pos.	Rider	Points
1	1	(Italy) Enea Bastianini	155
2	2	(United Kingdom) Sam Lowes	153
2	3	(Italy) Luca Marini	150
1	4	(Italy) Marco Bezzecchi	130
	5	(Spain) Jorge Martín	95

Constructors' Championship standings

Pos.	Constructor	Points
1	(Germany) Kalex	275
2	(Italy) Speed Up	91
3	(Italy) MV Agusta	30
4	(Japan) NTS	9

Teams' Championship standings

Pos.	Team	Points
1	(Italy) Sky Racing Team VR46	280
2	(Belgium) EG 0,0 Marc VDS	207
3	(Finland) Red Bull KTM Ajo	174
4	(Italy) Italtrans Racing Team	160
5	(Germany) Liqui Moly Intact GP	133

=== Moto3 ===
Riders' Championship standings

Pos.	Rider	Points
1	(Spain) Albert Arenas	144
2	(Japan) Ai Ogura	131
3	(Italy) Celestino Vietti	126
4	(Italy) Tony Arbolino	115
5	(United Kingdom) John McPhee	109

Constructors' Championship standings

	Pos.	Constructor	Points
1	1	(Japan) Honda	236
1	2	(Austria) KTM	232
	3	(Sweden) Husqvarna	74

Teams' Championship standings

	Pos.	Team	Points
2	1	(Luxembourg) Leopard Racing	177
1	2	(Italy) Sky Racing Team VR46	173
1	3	(Spain) Gaviota Aspar Team Moto3	170
	4	(Italy) Rivacold Snipers Team	135
1	5	(Italy) Kömmerling Gresini Moto3	133

== Notes ==
Previous race: 2020 French Grand Prix	FIM Grand Prix World Championship; 2020 season	Next race: 2020 Teruel Grand Prix
Previous race: 2019 Aragon Grand Prix	Aragon motorcycle Grand Prix	Next race: 2021 Aragon Grand Prix
