= Red Bull KTM Factory Racing =

KTM factory team

KTM Red Bull
- 2026 name: Red Bull KTM Factory Racing
- Base: Munderfing, Austria
- Principal: Aki Ajo; Pit Beirer
- Rider(s): MotoGP: 33. Brad Binder; 37. Pedro Acosta; 26. Dani Pedrosa (test rider); 44. Pol Espargaro (test rider); 94. Jonas Folger (test rider); 82. Mika Kallio (test rider)
- Motorcycle: KTM RC16
- Tyres: Michelin

Red Bull KTM Factory Racing is the factory team of KTM active in the MotoGP World Championship supported by sponsor, drinks manufacturer Red Bull.

== History ==
=== Development of the RC16 ===
KTM have a well-established presence amongst off-road motorcycle sport and entered MotoGP in the premier class of motorcycle road racing.

In September 2014, Pit Beirer announced that KTM were to start in MotoGP for 2017, even though work on the project had not started. A year and a half before their MotoGP debut, KTM tested their V4 engine for the first time, a configuration designed to use a steel trellis frame chassis only used by this team.

In October 2015, the KTM RC16 was track-tested on for the first time at the Red Bull Ring with Alex Hofmann as the first test rider on the bike. The team carried out further testing at circuits such as Circuit Ricardo Tormo, Circuito de Jerez, Brno Circuit, Misano World Circuit Marco Simoncelli and Mugello Circuit whilst using test riders, Mika Kallio, Randy De Puniet, Karel Abraham and Thomas Lüthi.

=== Presentation and Wildcard ===
The team presented the RC16 to the public for the first time before the start of the 2016 Austrian GP with test riders Kallio and Hofmann doing a couple of laps before announcing that Mika Kallio would have a wildcard entry for the 2016 Valencian GP aboard the RC16, making the official debut race for the machine and KTM into the MotoGP category.

In November 2016, Kallio rode the RC16 as a wildcard at the final race in Valencia, qualifying in 20th place. After initially keeping up with the pace during the opening stages of the race, the bike's rear wheel sensors malfunctioned forcing Kallio to retire from the race.

=== Final Testing ===
Pol Espargaró and Bradley Smith tested the RC16 during the first official winter test, just one day after the final grand prix of 2016 season at Valencia. This was the first time that the pair had ridden KTMs after leaving the Tech 3 team where they had been teammates for three years.

KTM had a private test at the Jerez circuit towards the end of November. Due to Espargaró still being under contract with Yamaha at the time, he was unable to test which meant that Mika Kallio stood in for him. In January and February, KTM took part in the official pre-season tests at Sepang International Circuit and Phillip Island Grand Prix Circuit as well as the final test at Losail International Circuit just two weeks before the first Grand Prix of 2017 in March.

The team unveiled the bike at their headquarters at the end of February along with Red Bull KTM Ajo's Moto3 title defender and their new Moto2 KTM competitor.

=== 2017 Debut Season ===
The team made their debut in the MotoGP category at the 2017 Qatar motorcycle Grand Prix; qualifying in 22nd and 23rd, they were able to finish in 16th and 17th six seconds apart. The team scored their first points in their second grand prix in Argentina, finishing 14th and 15th.

At the 2017 French motorcycle Grand Prix Espargaró finished in 12th place in the race which was the best result until he finished in 11th place in the Dutch TT, and qualified 7th at the 2017 German motorcycle Grand Prix in which Mika Kallio made his second appearance on the RC16 as a wildcard.

Kallio finished 16th whilst Espargaró and Smith collected more points. At the 2017 Czech Republic motorcycle Grand Prix Espargaró finished in 9th which was the team's first top 10 in a MotoGP Grand Prix. Pol would reach this feat again at the 2017 Australian motorcycle Grand Prix.

=== 2018 season ===
Expectations from KTM were to step up their results. This had happened at the start of the season with Espargaró finishing in the points a total of seven times in a row. Smith struggled to get the same start to the season that Espargaró had. At the 2018 Spanish motorcycle Grand Prix it was announced that Johann Zarco would replace Smith for 2019.

During the 2018 German motorcycle Grand Prix Kallio suffered a major knee injury during the practice sessions. Injury would then befall Espargaró who broke his collar bone in a warm-up session in preparation for the 2018 Czech Republic motorcycle Grand Prix.

Smith would be the stand-alone KTM factory rider, with Espargaró trying to return from injury too soon resulting in poor results and even not starting a Grand Prix. After a tough season and not meeting as many expectations, the 2018 Valencian Community motorcycle Grand Prix would become the most successful day in KTM so far in Grand Prix Racing. KTM and Espargaró would, respectively, take both their first podiums in the top class of motorcycle grand prix racing with Smith ending his KTM career with a personal best finish with 8th place in the torrential rain of Valencia.

=== 2019 season ===
In August 2019, contracted rider Johann Zarco announced he would not ride for KTM in 2020. In September 2019, the KTM team announced Zarco would not ride in the remaining six events from 22 September, with test rider Mika Kallio taking his place.

=== 2020 season ===
On 9 August 2020, KTM secured their first MotoGP win, and their first dry weather podium with Brad Binder at the Czech Grand Prix.

== KTM GP Academy ==
The KTM GP Academy was created as a talent filtering system to identify, support, and nurture some prospects from development series like the Red Bull MotoGP Rookies Cup, the Northern Talent Cup, and the Austrian Junior Cup through the learning process of Moto3 and Moto2. The factory-run structure is established with the cooperation of key teams and partners such as Red Bull KTM Ajo and Red Bull KTM Tech3, with the goal of eventually elevating an athlete onto the MotoGP grid. Names like Brad Binder, Augusto Fernandez, Miguel Oliveira, and Remy Gardner have all made full steps through the KTM GP Academy while Pedro Acosta has won two titles in just three seasons of Grand Prix competition.

== Results ==
=== Grand Prix motorcycle racing ===
==== By rider ====
Year	Class	Team name	Bike	Riders	Races	Wins	Podiums	Poles	F. laps	Points	Pos.
2019	MotoGP	Red Bull KTM Factory Racing	KTM RC16	(France) Johann Zarco	13	0	0	0	0	27 (30)	18th
2019	MotoGP	Red Bull KTM Factory Racing	KTM RC16	(Spain) Pol Espargaró	18	0	0	0	0	100	11th
2019	MotoGP	Red Bull KTM Factory Racing	KTM RC16	(Finland) Mika Kallio	6	0	0	0	0	7	26th
2020	MotoGP	Red Bull KTM Factory Racing	KTM RC16	(South Africa) Brad Binder	14	1	1	0	2	87	11th
2020	MotoGP	Red Bull KTM Factory Racing	KTM RC16	(Spain) Pol Espargaró	14	0	5	2	1	135	5th
2021	MotoGP	Red Bull KTM Factory Racing	KTM RC16	(South Africa) Brad Binder	18	1	1	0	0	151	6th
2021	MotoGP	Red Bull KTM Factory Racing	KTM RC16	(Spain) Dani Pedrosa	1	0	0	0	0	6	25th
2021	MotoGP	Red Bull KTM Factory Racing	KTM RC16	(Portugal) Miguel Oliveira	18	1	3	0	1	94	14th
2022	MotoGP	Red Bull KTM Factory Racing	KTM RC16	(South Africa) Brad Binder	20	0	3	0	1	188	6th
2022	MotoGP	Red Bull KTM Factory Racing	KTM RC16	(Portugal) Miguel Oliveira	20	2	2	0	0	149	10th
2023	MotoGP	Red Bull KTM Factory Racing	KTM RC16	(South Africa) Brad Binder	20	0	5	0	1	293	4th
2023	MotoGP	Red Bull KTM Factory Racing	KTM RC16	(Spain) Dani Pedrosa	2	0	0	0	0	32	21st
2023	MotoGP	Red Bull KTM Factory Racing	KTM RC16	(Australia) Jack Miller	20	0	1	0	0	163	11th
2024	MotoGP	Red Bull KTM Factory Racing	KTM RC16	(South Africa) Brad Binder	19	0	1	0	0	217	5th
2024	MotoGP	Red Bull KTM Factory Racing	KTM RC16	(Spain) Pol Espargaró	3	0	0	0	0	12	23rd
2024	MotoGP	Red Bull KTM Factory Racing	KTM RC16	(Spain) Dani Pedrosa	1	0	0	0	0	7	24th
2024	MotoGP	Red Bull KTM Factory Racing	KTM RC16	(Australia) Jack Miller	19	0	0	0	0	87	14th
2025	MotoGP	Red Bull KTM Factory Racing	KTM RC16	(South Africa) Brad Binder	22	0	0	0	0	155	11th
2025	MotoGP	Red Bull KTM Factory Racing	KTM RC16	(Spain) Pedro Acosta	22	0	5	0	1	307	4th
2026	MotoGP	Red Bull KTM Factory Racing	KTM RC16	(South Africa) Brad Binder	19	0	0	0	0	118*	12th*
2026	MotoGP	Red Bull KTM Factory Racing	KTM RC16	(Spain) Pedro Acosta	19	1	7	1	2	309*	4th*

==== MotoGP results ====
(key)

Year	Motorcycle	Tyres	Riders		Races																				Rider's standings		Team standings		Manufacturers' standings	
Year	Motorcycle	Tyres	No.	Name	1	2	3	4	5	6	7	8	9	10	11	12	13	14	15	16	17	18	19	20	Points	Pos	Pts	Pos	Points	Position
2017	KTM RC16	M			QAT	ARG	AME	SPA	FRA	ITA	CAT	NED	GER	CZE	AUT	GBR	RSM	ARA	JPN	AUS	MAL	VAL								
2017	KTM RC16	M	36	(Finland) Mika Kallio									16		10			11				Ret			11	24th	—N/a		69	5th
2017	KTM RC16	M	38	(United Kingdom) Bradley Smith	17	15	16	14	13	20	DNS	Ret	14	Ret	18	17	10	19	17	10	12	11			29	21st	84	10th	69	5th
2017	KTM RC16	M	44	(Spain) Pol Espargaró	16	14	Ret	Ret	12	Ret	18	11	13	9	Ret	11	11	10	11	9	10	Ret			55	17th	84	10th	69	5th
2018	KTM RC16	M			QAT	ARG	AME	SPA	FRA	ITA	CAT	NED	GER	CZE	AUT	GBR	RSM	ARA	THA	JPN	AUS	MAL	VAL							
2018	KTM RC16	M	36	(Finland) Mika Kallio				10			Ret		DNS												6	25th	—N/a		72	5th
2018	KTM RC16	M	38	(United Kingdom) Bradley Smith	18	Ret	16	13	14	14	Ret	17	10	Ret	14	C	16	13	15	12	10	15	8		38	18th	89	9th	72	5th
2018	KTM RC16	M	44	(Spain) Pol Espargaró	Ret	11	13	11	11	11	11	12	Ret	DNS			Ret	DNS	21	13	Ret	Ret	3		51	14th	89	9th	72	5th
2018	KTM RC16	M	76	(France) Loris Baz												C									0	NC	89	9th	72	5th
2019	KTM RC16	M			QAT	ARG	AME	SPA	FRA	ITA	CAT	NED	GER	CZE	AUT	GBR	RSM	ARA	THA	JPN	AUS	MAL	VAL							
2019	KTM RC16	M	5	(France) Johann Zarco	15	15	13	14	13	17	10	Ret	Ret	14	12	Ret	11								27 (30)	18th	134	8th	111	5th
2019	KTM RC16	M	44	(Spain) Pol Espargaró	12	10	8	13	6	9	7	11	12	11	Ret	9	7	DNS	13	11	12	11	10		100	11th	134	8th	111	5th
2019	KTM RC16	M	82	(Finland) Mika Kallio														17	Ret	14	Ret	15	12		7	26th	134	8th	111	5th
2020	KTM RC16	M			SPA	ANC	CZE	AUT	STY	RSM	EMI	CAT	FRA	ARA	TER	EUR	VAL	POR												
2020	KTM RC16	M	33	(South Africa) Brad Binder	13	Ret	1	4	8	12	Ret	11	12	11	Ret	7	5	Ret							87	11th	222	3rd	200	4th
2020	KTM RC16	M	44	(Spain) Pol Espargaró	6	7	Ret	Ret	3	10	3	Ret	3	12	4	3	3	4							135	5th	222	3rd	200	4th
2021	KTM RC16	M			QAT	DOH	POR	SPA	FRA	ITA	CAT	GER	NED	STY	AUT	GBR	ARA	RSM	AME	EMI	ALR	VAL								
2021	KTM RC16	M	33	(South Africa) Brad Binder	14	8	5	Ret	13	5	8	4	12	4	1	6	7	9	9	11	10	7			151	6th	245	6th	205	5th
2021	KTM RC16	M	88	(Portugal) Miguel Oliveira	13	15	16	11	Ret	2	1	2	5	Ret	Ret	16	14	20	11	Ret	Ret	14			94	14th	245	6th	205	5th
2022	KTM RC16	M			QAT	INA	ARG	AME	POR	SPA	FRA	ITA	CAT	GER	NED	GBR	AUT	RSM	ARA	JPN	THA	AUS	MAL	VAL						
2022	KTM RC16	M	33	(South Africa) Brad Binder	2	8	6	13	Ret	10	8	7	8	7	5	11	7	8	4	2	10	10	8	2	188	6th	337	2nd	240	4th
2022	KTM RC16	M	88	(Portugal) Miguel Oliveira	Ret	1	13	18	5	12	Ret	9	9	9	9	6	12	11	11	5	1	12	13	5	149	10th	337	2nd	240	4th

Year	Bike	Tyres	No.	Riders	Race																						Rider's standings		Team standings		Manufacturers standings	
Year	Bike	Tyres	No.	Riders	1	2	3	4	5	6	7	8	9	10	11	12	13	14	15	16	17	18	19	20	21	22	Pts	Pos	Pts	Pos	Pts	Pos
2023	KTM RC16	M			POR	ARG	AME	SPA	FRA	ITA	GER	NED	GBR	AUT	CAT	RSM	IND	JPN	INA	AUS	THA	MAL	QAT	VAL								
2023	KTM RC16	M	26	(Spain) Dani Pedrosa				7^{6}								4^{4}											32	21st	456	4th	373	2nd
2023	KTM RC16	M	33	(South Africa) Brad Binder	6	17^{1}	13^{5}	2^{1}	6^{2}	5	Ret^{6}	4^{5}	3^{9}	2^{2}	Ret^{4}	14^{5}	4^{4}	Ret^{2}	6	4	3^{2}	Ret^{5}	5^{7}	3^{2}			293	4th	456	4th	373	2nd
2023	KTM RC16	M	43	(Australia) Jack Miller	7^{4}	6	Ret^{9}	3^{3}	Ret	7^{6}	6^{3}	Ret	8^{7}	15^{5}	8	Ret	14^{7}	6^{4}	7^{9}	7	16	8^{6}	9	Ret			163	11th	456	4th	373	2nd
2024	KTM RC16	M			QAT	POR	AME	SPA	FRA	CAT	ITA	NED	GER	GBR	AUT	ARA	RSM	EMI	INA	JPN	AUS	THA	MAL	SLD								
2024	KTM RC16	M	26	(Spain) Dani Pedrosa				Ret^{3}																			7	24th	304	6th	327	2nd
2024	KTM RC16	M	33	(South Africa) Brad Binder	2 ^{2}	4	9	6	8	8	10^{6}	6^{6}	9^{8}	Ret^{4}	5^{7}	4^{6}	4^{7}	19 ^{6}	8	6	7	6^{9}	DNS^{7}	6^{9}			217	5th	304	6th	327	2nd
2024	KTM RC16	M	43	(Australia) Jack Miller	21	5^{5}	13^{7}	Ret	Ret^{8}	Ret^{7}	16	11	13	12^{7}	19^{5}	15	8^{8}	16	Ret	10^{8}	11	5	DNS^{8}	13			87	14th	304	6th	327	2nd
2024	KTM RC16	M	44	(Spain) Pol Espargaró							17				11^{9}		10										12	23rd	304	6th	327	2nd
2025	KTM RC16	M			THA	ARG	AME	QAT	SPA	FRA	GBR	ARA	ITA	NED	GER	CZE	AUT	HUN	CAT	RSM	JPN	INA	AUS	MAL	POR	VAL						
2025	KTM RC16	M	33	(South Africa) Brad Binder	8^{8}	7	Ret^{9}	13	6	Ret	14	Ret^{9}	9	11	7^{6}	8	7^{5}	7	Ret^{6}	10	12	4	8	9	5^{9}	8^{8}	155	11th	462	4th	372	3rd
2025	KTM RC16	M	37	(Spain) Pedro Acosta	19^{6}	8^{9}	Ret^{7}	8	7	4	6^{8}	4^{5}	8	4^{9}	Ret^{9}	3^{2}	4^{3}	2	4^{4}	Ret^{5}	17^{3}	2^{5}	5^{3}	2^{3}	3^{2 F}	4^{2}	307	4th	462	4th	372	3rd
2026	KTM RC16	M			THA	BRA	USA	SPA	FRA	CAT	ITA	HUN	CZE	NED	GER	GBR	ARA	RSM	AUT	JPN	INA	AUS	MAL	QAT	POR	VAL						
2026	KTM RC16	M	33	(South Africa) Brad Binder	7^{6}	Ret	12	11^{4}	Ret	7	11	10	12^{9}	11	10	8	10	11	6^{9}	11	11	C^{6}	9^{7}	Ret			118*	12th*	427*	4th*	363*	3rd*
2026	KTM RC16	M	37	(Spain) Pedro Acosta	2^{1}	7^{9}	3^{8}	10	5^{4}	Ret^{P 2}	6^{9}	2^{2}	Ret	Ret^{9}	4^{8}	5^{6}	2^{4}	3^{6}	1^{F}	7	5^{6}	C^{5}	2^{P 1}	6^{6}			309*	4th*	427*	4th*	363*	3rd*
