= 2018 European Talent Cup =

2018 European Talent Cup
Previous:	2017	Next:	2019
Support series: FIM CEV Moto3 Junior World Championship; FIM CEV Moto2 European Championship

The 2018 European Talent Cup is the second season of the European Talent Cup.

== Calendar ==
The following races were scheduled to take place in 2018.

Rnd	Circuit	Date	Pole position	Fastest lap	Winning rider	Winning team
1	(Portugal) Circuito do Estoril	25 March	(Belgium) Barry Baltus	(Spain) Julián Giral	(Belgium) Barry Baltus	Reale Avintia Academy
1	(Portugal) Circuito do Estoril	25 March	(Belgium) Barry Baltus	(Spain) Julián Giral	(Spain) Julián Giral	Talent Team Estrella Galicia 0,0
2	(Spain) Circuit Ricardo Tormo	29 April	(Spain) Daniel Muñoz	(Spain) José Antonio Rueda	(Spain) Francisco Gómez	Larresport Bradol
2	(Spain) Circuit Ricardo Tormo	29 April	(Spain) Daniel Muñoz	(Spain) Daniel Muñoz	(Italy) Matteo Patacca	Sic58 Squadra Corse
3	(Spain) Circuit de Barcelona-Catalunya	10 June	(Italy) Matteo Patacca	(Spain) Julián Giral	(Italy) Matteo Patacca	Sic58 Squadra Corse
4	(Spain) MotorLand Aragón	29 July	(Spain) José Antonio Rueda	(Spain) David Muñoz	(Spain) José Antonio Rueda	Talent Team Estrella Galicia 0,0
4	(Spain) MotorLand Aragón	29 July	(Spain) José Antonio Rueda	(Spain) Fermín Aldeguer	(Spain) David Muñoz	Jerez Andalucia Motor Talent
5	(Spain) Circuito de Jerez	30 September	(Spain) David Salvador	(Spain) David Muñoz	(Italy) Matteo Bertelle	Sic58 Squadra Corse
5	(Spain) Circuito de Jerez	30 September	(Spain) David Salvador	(Spain) José Antonio Rueda	(Italy) Matteo Bertelle	Sic58 Squadra Corse
6	(Spain) Circuito de Albacete	14 October	(Spain) Álex Millán	(Italy) Matteo Bertelle	(Spain) Álex Millán	ARO Racing
7	(Spain) Circuit Ricardo Tormo	25 November	(Spain) José Antonio Rueda	(Italy) Matteo Bertelle	(Spain) Víctor Rodríguez	Laglisse Academy

== Entry list ==
2018 entry list
Team	Bike	No.	Rider
(Netherlands) HDRACING	Honda	3	(Netherlands) Rick Dunnik
(Italy) Marinelli Sniper Team	Honda	4	(Portugal) Kiko Maria
(Italy) Marinelli Sniper Team	Honda	11	(Italy) Mattia Molino
(Finland) Ajo Motorsport	Honda	5	(France) Lorenzo Fellon
(Finland) Ajo Motorsport	Honda	31	(Spain) Adrián Fernández
(Germany) Intact Battery Power MAS-FMT (Germany) Dynavolt Intact GP Junior Team	Honda	6	(Germany) Dirk Geiger
(Germany) Intact Battery Power MAS-FMT (Germany) Dynavolt Intact GP Junior Team	Honda	35	(Germany) Joshua Bauer
(Spain) Jerez Andalucia Motor Talent	Honda	7	(Spain) Daniel Muñoz
(Spain) Jerez Andalucia Motor Talent	Honda	30	(Spain) David Muñoz
(Spain) H43 Team Nobby-Blumaq	Honda	8	(Canada) Jake Hayes
(Spain) H43 Team Nobby-Blumaq	Honda	12	(Finland) Peetu Paavilainen
(Spain) H43 Team Nobby-Blumaq	Honda	57	(Finland) Kenny Koskinen
(Spain) Larresport Bradol	Honda	9	(Spain) Francisco Gómez
(Spain) Larresport Bradol	Honda	24	(France) Matthieu Gregorio
(Spain) Grupo Machado-Came	Honda	10	(Spain) Eduard Melgar
(Spain) Grupo Machado-Came	Honda	34	(Colombia) Nicolás Hernández
(Spain) Grupo Machado-Came	Honda	83	(France) Aurel Nyul
(Spain) Reale Avintia Academy (Spain) Reale Avintia Blumaq HMA	Honda	13	(Germany) Nicolas Czyba
(Spain) Reale Avintia Academy (Spain) Reale Avintia Blumaq HMA	Honda	47	(Belgium) Barry Baltus
(Spain) Reale Avintia Academy (Spain) Reale Avintia Blumaq HMA	Honda	61	(Spain) Iker García
(Spain) Reale Avintia Academy (Spain) Reale Avintia Blumaq HMA	Honda	66	(Spain) Adrián Huertas
(Spain) Reale Avintia Academy (Spain) Reale Avintia Blumaq HMA	Honda	99	(Spain) Carlos Tatay
(Spain) Equipo Punto Moto	Honda	14	(Spain) Carlos Torrecillas
(United Kingdom) KRP	Honda	16	(United Kingdom) Jamie William Davis
(United Kingdom) KRP	Honda	19	(Austria) Andreas Kofler
(Netherlands) Ernst Dubbink Eveno Racing	Honda	17	(Netherlands) Ruben Bijman
(France) CIP Junior Team	Honda	18	(Spain) Ángel Heredia
(France) CIP Junior Team	Honda	22	(France) Clément Rougé
(France) CIP Junior Team	Honda	48	(France) Gabin Planques
(France) CIP Junior Team	Honda	58	(Spain) Iñigo Iglesias
(Spain) Laglisse Academy	Honda	21	(France) Vincent Falcone
(Spain) Laglisse Academy	Honda	91	(Spain) Víctor Rodríguez
(Spain) ARO Racing	Honda	23	(Spain) Álex Millán
(Spain) Dani Rivas Talent Team	Honda	25	(Spain) Luis Miguel Verdugo
(Spain) Honda Impala	Honda	27	(Spain) Alejandro Díez
(Spain) Honda Impala	Honda	43	(Spain) Xavier Artigas
(Italy) Sic58 Squadra Corse	Honda	28	(Italy) Matteo Bertelle
(Italy) Sic58 Squadra Corse	Honda	72	(Italy) Mattia Falzone
(Italy) Sic58 Squadra Corse	Honda	88	(Italy) Matteo Patacca
(Spain) Igax Team	Honda	33	(Czech Republic) Filip Řeháček
(Spain) Igax Team	Honda	50	(Czech Republic) Ondřej Vostatek
(Portugal) Miguel Oliveira Fan Club Racing Team	Honda	37	(Portugal) Pedro Miguel Fragoso
(Spain) Sport&Events Management Academy	Honda	42	(Hungary) Soma Görbe
(Spain) Team Stratos-EMA Competicion	Honda	44	(Brazil) Guilherme Silva Brito
(Belgium) West Racing	Honda	45	(Belgium) Luca De Vleeschauwer
(Spain) Cuna de Campeones	Honda	46	(Spain) David Salvador
(Spain) MRE Talent	Honda	51	(Spain) David Delgado
(Spain) MRE Talent	Honda	69	(Spain) Unai Caldeiro
(Spain) MRE Talent	Honda	89	(Spain) Marcos Uriarte
(Italy) Bester Capital Dubai Junior Team	Honda	54	(Spain) Fermín Aldeguer
(Czech Republic) MK Racing Team	Honda	55	(Czech Republic) Matyáš Konečný
(United Kingdom) Nykos Racing	Honda	64	(Netherlands) Colin Velthuizen
(Spain) FAU55 Racing	Honda	70	(United Kingdom) Joshua Whatley
(Spain) Talent Team Estrella Galicia 0,0	Honda	76	(Spain) Julián Giral
(Spain) Talent Team Estrella Galicia 0,0	Honda	95	(Spain) José Antonio Rueda
(Spain) Talent Team Estrella Galicia 0,0	Honda	96	(Spain) Daniel Holgado
(Italy) Bierreti	Honda	79	(Italy) Salvo Ragusa
(Germany) Prustel Blumaq HMA	Honda	94	(Germany) Marvin Siebdrath

== Championship standings ==
Points were awarded to the top fifteen riders, provided the rider finished the race.

Position	1st	2nd	3rd	4th	5th	6th	7th	8th	9th	10th	11th	12th	13th	14th	15th
Points	25	20	16	13	11	10	9	8	7	6	5	4	3	2	1

Pos.	Rider	EST (Portugal)		VAL (Spain)		CAT (Spain)	ARA (Spain)		JER (Spain)		ALB (Spain)	VAL (Spain)	Pts
1	(Spain) Xavier Artigas	4	7	Ret	7	2	2	5	2	3	5	5	140
2	(Spain) Víctor Rodríguez	12	5	2	6	DNS	4	2	8	5	4	1	135
3	(Spain) David Salvador	8	Ret	Ret	3	8	3^{F}	7	5^{P}	2^{P}	2	8	116
4	(Spain) José Antonio Rueda	17	8	Ret^{F}	13	3	1^{P}	6^{P}	3	Ret^{F}	Ret	2^{P}	98
5	(Italy) Matteo Bertelle	7	Ret	19	15	10	17	4	1	1	Ret^{F}	11^{F}	84
6	(Spain) Adrián Fernández	11	10	4	5	Ret	6	Ret	4	Ret	6	3	84
7	(Italy) Matteo Patacca	6	4	7	1	1^{P}			DNS	DNS	DNS	32	82
8	(Spain) Julián Giral	2^{F}	1^{F}	Ret	Ret	4^{F}	10	12	Ret	Ret	8	DNS	76
9	(Spain) Francisco Gómez	10	2	1	11	18	21	Ret	Ret	18	11	7	70
10	(Spain) Fermín Aldeguer	3	Ret	Ret	Ret	Ret	Ret	Ret^{F}	Ret	4	3	4	58
11	(Spain) Daniel Holgado	Ret	12	3	DSQ	16	25	19	9	7	7	6	55
12	(Belgium) Barry Baltus	1^{P}	3^{P}	10	9								54
13	(Spain) David Muñoz					17	8	1	6^{F}	6	Ret	19	53
14	(Spain) Daniel Muñoz			26^{P}	4^{PF}		7	3	Ret	8	9	18	53
15	(Czech Republic) Ondřej Vostatek	18	9	8	18	19	9	9	11	10	18	9	47
16	(France) Lorenzo Fellon	Ret	Ret	20	16	7	11	8	10	9	10	12	45
17	(Finland) Peetu Paavilainen	Ret	6	Ret	2	15	Ret	10	Ret	DNS		33	37
18	(Spain) Álex Millán	DNQ	DNQ	15	34	35	37	33	26	24	1^{P}	13	29
19	(Spain) Carlos Torrecillas	9	14	Ret	8	Ret	5	Ret	Ret	Ret	Ret	23	28
20	(Germany) Dirk Geiger	16	Ret	11	22	9	19	16	14	11	12	14	25
21	(Spain) Alejandro Díez	19	19	Ret	14	6	12	Ret	12	12	25	DNS	24
22	(Spain) Marcos Uriarte					13	16	14	7	13	Ret	10	23
23	(Spain) Carlos Tatay	5	Ret	5	Ret								22
24	(Spain) Luis Verdugo	22	18	6	Ret	14	Ret	13	19	20	23	16	15
25	(Spain) Miguel Parra					5	13	17	Ret	16			14
26	(France) Clément Rougé	13	17	21	12	11	20	23	22	14		Ret	14
27	(Netherlands) Colin Velthuizen	20	11	22	10	24	38	Ret	Ret	36	Ret	26	11
28	(United Kingdom) Joshua Whatley	28	23	9	19	27	24	29			14	20	9
29	(Spain) Iñigo Iglesias	Ret	16	Ret	Ret	Ret	15	11					6
30	(Spain) Adrián Huertas	DNS	DNS	Ret	17	12			20	22	Ret	15	5
31	(Belgium) Luca de Vleeschauwer			12	25	29	Ret	32	21	23		22	4
32	(Netherlands) Ruben Bijman	DNQ	DNQ	23	30	32	36	26	13	17	Ret	17	3
33	(Netherlands) Rick Dunnik	Ret	Ret	13	28	22	23	25	23	28	21	28	3
34	(Spain) Eduard Melgar						22	Ret	24	30	13		3
35	(Colombia) Nicolás Hernández	Ret	13	Ret	27								3
36	(France) Gabin Planques	14	Ret	28	32	26	27	20	17	27	Ret	38	2
37	(Spain) Ángel Heredia	26	27	18	26	21	14	Ret				DNS	2
38	(France) Matthieu Grégorio	Ret	21	14	20	25							2
39	(Czech Republic) Filip Řeháček	32	28	25	29	28	28	22	Ret	15	15	30	2
40	(Spain) Iker García	Ret	26	17	24	DNQ	18	15	18	19	16	DNQ	1
41	(Austria) Andreas Kofler	24	20	24	Ret	DNQ	35	30	15	21	22	24	1
42	(France) Vincent Falcone	15	Ret			Ret	31	27				25	1
43	(Finland) Kenny Koskinen	Ret	15	Ret	33	33	32	Ret	30	32			1
Pos.	Rider	EST (Portugal)		VAL (Spain)		CAT (Spain)	ARA (Spain)		JER (Spain)		ALB (Spain)	VAL (Spain)	Pts

Colour	Result
Gold	Winner
Silver	Second place
Bronze	Third place
Green	Points classification
Blue	Non-points classification
Blue	Non-classified finish (NC)
Purple	Retired, not classified (Ret)
Red	Did not qualify (DNQ)
Red	Did not pre-qualify (DNPQ)
Black	Disqualified (DSQ)
White	Did not start (DNS)
White	Withdrew (WD)
White	Race cancelled (C)
Blank	Did not practice (DNP)
Blank	Did not arrive (DNA)
Blank	Excluded (EX)

P – Pole position
F – Fastest lap
