= 2025 Aragon motorcycle Grand Prix =

Motorcycle race in Alcañiz

2025 Aragon Grand Prix
Race details
- Race 8 of 22 races in the 2025 Grand Prix motorcycle racing season
- Date: 8 June 2025
- Official name: GoPro Grand Prix of Aragón
- Location: MotorLand Aragón; Alcañiz, Spain
- Course: Permanent racing facility; 5.077 km (3.155 mi)

MotoGP
Pole position
Rider	(Spain) Marc Márquez	Ducati
Time	1:45.704	
Fastest lap
Rider	(Spain) Marc Márquez	Ducati
Time	1:46.705 on lap 21	
Podium
First	(Spain) Marc Márquez	Ducati
Second	(Spain) Álex Márquez	Ducati
Third	(Italy) Francesco Bagnaia	Ducati

Moto2
Pole position
Rider	(Brazil) Diogo Moreira	Kalex
Time	1:49.940	
Fastest lap
Rider	(Brazil) Diogo Moreira	Kalex
Time	1:50.327 on lap 18	
Podium
First	(Turkey) Deniz Öncü	Kalex
Second	(Brazil) Diogo Moreira	Kalex
Third	(Belgium) Barry Baltus	Kalex

Moto3
Pole position
Rider	(Spain) José Antonio Rueda	KTM
Time	1:56.361	
Fastest lap
Rider	(Italy) Luca Lunetta	Honda
Time	1:56.912 on lap 6	
Podium
First	(Spain) David Muñoz	KTM
Second	(Spain) Máximo Quiles	KTM
Third	(Spain) Álvaro Carpe	KTM

The 2025 Aragon motorcycle Grand Prix (officially known as the GoPro Grand Prix of Aragon) was the eighth round of the 2025 Grand Prix motorcycle racing season. All races were held at the MotorLand Aragón in Alcañiz on 8 June 2025.

Luca Marini did not participate in MotoGP as he sustained multiple injuries in a heavy crash while testing for the 2025 Suzuka 8 Hour. He was not be replaced for the Aragon round. In Moto2, Nakarin Atiratphuvapat replaced the injured Mario Aji for Honda Team Asia. Daniel Munoz, normally racing on Forward machinery, was replacing injured Collin Veijer in Aragon at Red Bull KTM Ajo.

== Practice session ==
=== MotoGP ===
==== Combined Free Practice 1-2 ====
Practice times (written in bold) are the fastest times in the session.

Fastest session lap

Pos.	No.	Biker	Team	Constructor	Practice times	
Pos.	No.	Biker	Team	Constructor	P1	P2
1	93	(Spain) Marc Márquez	Ducati Lenovo Team	Ducati	**1:46.974**	1:46.607
2	37	(Spain) Pedro Acosta	Red Bull KTM Factory Racing	KTM	1:48.078	1:46.748
3	21	(Italy) Franco Morbidelli	Pertamina Enduro VR46 Racing Team	Ducati	1:48.319	1:46.772
4	12	(Spain) Maverick Viñales	Red Bull KTM Tech3	KTM	1:48.077	1:46.942
5	33	(South Africa) Brad Binder	Red Bull KTM Factory Racing	KTM	1:48.500	1:47.039
6	72	(Italy) Marco Bezzecchi	Aprilia Racing	Aprilia	1:47.995	1:47.065
7	63	(Italy) Francesco Bagnaia	Ducati Lenovo Team	Ducati	1:48.482	1:47.070
8	20	(France) Fabio Quartararo	Monster Energy Yamaha MotoGP Team	Yamaha	1:48.488	1:47.109
9	54	(Spain) Fermín Aldeguer	BK8 Gresini Racing MotoGP	Ducati	1:48.298	1:47.346
10	73	(Spain) Álex Márquez	BK8 Gresini Racing MotoGP	Ducati	1:47.944	1:47.375
11	42	(Spain) Álex Rins	Monster Energy Yamaha MotoGP Team	Yamaha	1:47.998	1:47.474
12	36	(Spain) Joan Mir	Honda HRC Castrol	Honda	1:48.293	1:47.607
13	43	(Australia) Jack Miller	Prima Pramac Yamaha MotoGP	Yamaha	1:48.587	1:47.634
14	5	(France) Johann Zarco	Castrol Honda LCR	Honda	1:48.488	1:47.672
15	49	(Italy) Fabio Di Giannantonio	Pertamina Enduro VR46 Racing Team	Ducati	1:48.653	1:47.765
16	25	(Spain) Raúl Fernández	Trackhouse MotoGP Team	Aprilia	1:48.930	1:47.832
17	7	(Spain) Augusto Fernández	Yamaha Factory Racing	Yamaha	1:48.592	1:47.858
18	88	(Portugal) Miguel Oliveira	Prima Pramac Yamaha MotoGP	Yamaha	1:49.435	1:47.870
19	23	(Italy) Enea Bastianini	Red Bull KTM Tech3	KTM	1:49.163	1:47.928
20	35	(Thailand) Somkiat Chantra	IDEMITSU Honda LCR	Honda	1:49.471	1:48.905
21	32	(Italy) Lorenzo Savadori	Aprilia Racing	Aprilia	1:50.135	1:49.021
OFFICIAL MOTOGP COMBINED PRACTICE TIMES REPORT

==== Practice ====
The top 10 riders (written in bold) qualified for Q2.

Fastest session lap

Pos.	No.	Biker	Team	Constructor	
Pos.	No.	Biker	Team	Constructor	Time results
1	93	**(Spain) Marc Márquez**	**Ducati Lenovo Team**	**Ducati**	**1:46.397**
2	73	**(Spain) Álex Márquez**	**BK8 Gresini Racing MotoGP**	**Ducati**	**1:46.601**
3	12	**(Spain) Maverick Viñales**	**Red Bull KTM Tech3**	**KTM**	**1:46.953**
4	36	**(Spain) Joan Mir**	**Honda HRC Castrol**	**Honda**	**1:46.953**
5	37	**(Spain) Pedro Acosta**	**Red Bull KTM Factory Racing**	**KTM**	**1:47.000**
6	5	**(France) Johann Zarco**	**CASTROL Honda LCR**	**Honda**	**1:47.058**
7	33	**(South Africa) Brad Binder**	**Red Bull KTM Factory Racing**	**KTM**	**1:47.096**
8	54	**(Spain) Fermín Aldeguer**	**BK8 Gresini Racing MotoGP**	**Ducati**	**1:47.130**
9	63	**(Italy) Francesco Bagnaia**	**Ducati Lenovo Team**	**Ducati**	**1:47.185**
10	21	**(Italy) Franco Morbidelli**	**Pertamina Enduro VR46 Racing Team**	**Ducati**	**1:47.213**
11	72	(Italy) Marco Bezzecchi	Aprilia Racing	Aprilia	1:47.222
12	49	(Italy) Fabio Di Giannantonio	Pertamina Enduro VR46 Racing Team	Ducati	1:47.241
13	23	(Italy) Enea Bastianini	Red Bull KTM Tech3	KTM	1:47.471
14	25	(Spain) Raúl Fernández	Trackhouse MotoGP Team	Aprilia	1:47.480
15	42	(Spain) Álex Rins	Monster Energy Yamaha MotoGP Team	Yamaha	1:47.509
16	43	(Australia) Jack Miller	Prima Pramac Yamaha MotoGP	Yamaha	1:47.552
17	7	(Spain) Augusto Fernández	Yamaha Factory Team	Yamaha	1:47.623
18	20	(France) Fabio Quartararo	Monster Energy Yamaha MotoGP Team	Yamaha	1:47.842
19	32	(Italy) Lorenzo Savadori	Aprilia Racing	Aprilia	1:48.123
20	88	(Portugal) Miguel Oliveira	Prima Pramac Yamaha MotoGP	Yamaha	1:48.290
21	35	(Thailand) Somkiat Chantra	IDEMITSU Honda LCR	Honda	1:48.501
OFFICIAL MOTOGP PRACTICE TIMES REPORT

=== Moto2 ===
==== Combined Practice 1-2 ====
Fastest session lap

Pos.	No.	Biker	Team	Constructor	Practice times	
Pos.	No.	Biker	Team	Constructor	P1	P2
1	53	(Turkey) Deniz Öncü	Red Bull KTM Ajo	Kalex	**1:51.356**	**1:50.190**
2	10	(Brazil) Diogo Moreira	Italtrans Racing Team	Kalex	1:52.586	1:50.491
3	80	(Colombia) David Alonso	CFMoto Inde Aspar Team	Kalex	1:51.395	1:50.780
4	7	(Belgium) Barry Baltus	Fantic Racing Lino Sonego	Kalex	1:52.069	1:50.840
5	21	(Spain) Alonso López	Beta Tools SpeedRS Team	Boscoscuro	1:52.118	1:50.847
6	75	(Spain) Albert Arenas	Italjet Gresini Moto2	Kalex	1:52.359	1:50.848
7	12	(Czech Republic) Filip Salač	Elf Marc VDS Racing Team	Boscoscuro	1:52.125	1:50.935
8	18	(Spain) Manuel González	Liqui Moly Dynavolt Intact GP	Kalex	1:51.385	1:50.965
9	13	(Italy) Celestino Vietti	Beta Tools SpeedRS Team	Boscoscuro	1:52.134	1:50.972
10	44	(Spain) Arón Canet	Fantic Racing Lino Sonego	Kalex	1:51.549	1:50.985
11	24	(Spain) Marcos Ramírez	OnlyFans American Racing Team	Kalex	1:51.583	1:51.026
12	96	(United Kingdom) Jake Dixon	Elf Marc VDS Racing Team	Boscoscuro	1:51.862	1:51.039
13	81	(Australia) Senna Agius	Liqui Moly Dynavolt Intact GP	Kalex	1:51.651	1:51.135
14	11	(Spain) Alex Escrig	Klint Forward Factory Team	Forward	1:52.937	1:51.257
15	17	(Spain) Daniel Muñoz	Red Bull KTM Ajo	Kalex	1:51.896	1:51.305
16	84	(Netherlands) Zonta van den Goorbergh	RW-Idrofoglia Racing GP	Kalex	1:53.035	1:51.336
17	16	(United States) Joe Roberts	OnlyFans American Racing Team	Kalex	1:52.222	1:51.347
18	27	(Spain) Daniel Holgado	CFMoto Inde Aspar Team	Kalex	1:51.871	1:51.359
19	28	(Spain) Izan Guevara	Blu Cru Pramac Yamaha Moto2	Boscoscuro	1:52.190	1:51.416
20	4	(Spain) Iván Ortolá	QJMotor – Frinsa – MSi	Boscoscuro	1:53.331	1:51.481
21	9	(Spain) Jorge Navarro	Klint Forward Factory Team	Forward	1:54.167	1:51.511
22	99	(Spain) Adrián Huertas	Italtrans Racing Team	Kalex	1:53.538	1:51.577
23	14	(Italy) Tony Arbolino	Blu Cru Pramac Yamaha Moto2	Boscoscuro	1:53.265	1:51.723
24	3	(Spain) Sergio García	QJMotor – Frinsa – MSi	Boscoscuro	1:53.187	1:51.758
25	71	(Japan) Ayumu Sasaki	RW-Idrofoglia Racing GP	Kalex	1:52.346	1:51.793
26	92	(Japan) Yuki Kunii	Idemitsu Honda Team Asia	Kalex	1:53.638	1:52.557
27	15	(South Africa) Darryn Binder	Italjet Gresini Moto2	Kalex	1:53.453	1:53.533
28	41	(Thailand) Nakarin Atiratphuvapat	Idemitsu Honda Team Asia	Kalex	1:57.798	1:55.022
OFFICIAL MOTO2 FREE PRACTICE TIMES REPORT

==== Practice ====
The top 14 riders (written in bold) qualified for Q2.

Pos.	No.	Biker	Team	Constructor	Time results
Pos.	No.	Biker	Team	Constructor	P1
1	18	(Spain) **Manuel González**	**Liqui Moly Dynavolt Intact GP**	**Kalex**	**1:50.548**
2	10	(Brazil) **Diogo Moreira**	**Italtrans Racing Team**	**Kalex**	1:50.753
3	53	(Turkey) **Deniz Öncü**	**Red Bull KTM Ajo**	**Kalex**	1:50.839
4	16	(United States) **Joe Roberts**	**OnlyFans American Racing Team**	**Kalex**	1:50.882
5	7	(Belgium) **Barry Baltus**	**Fantic Racing Lino Sonego**	**Kalex**	1:50.964
6	84	(Netherlands) **Zonta van den Goorbergh**	**RW-Idrofoglia Racing GP**	**Kalex**	1:50.990
7	96	(United Kingdom) **Jake Dixon**	**Elf Marc VDS Racing Team**	**Boscoscuro**	1:51.010
8	81	(Australia) **Senna Agius**	**Liqui Moly Dynavolt Intact GP**	**Kalex**	1:51.014
9	27	(Spain) **Daniel Holgado**	**CFMoto Inde Aspar Team**	**Kalex**	1:51.049
10	24	(Spain) **Marcos Ramírez**	**OnlyFans American Racing Team**	**Kalex**	1:51.056
11	44	(Spain) **Arón Canet**	**Fantic Racing Lino Sonego**	**Kalex**	1:51.089
12	75	(Spain) **Albert Arenas**	**Italjet Gresini Moto2**	**Kalex**	1:51.270
13	80	(Colombia) **David Alonso**	**CFMoto Inde Aspar Team**	**Kalex**	1:51.279
14	17	(Spain) **Daniel Muñoz**	**Red Bull KTM Ajo**	**Kalex**	1:51346
15	13	(Italy) Celestino Vietti	Beta Tools SpeedRS Team	Boscoscuro	1:51.388
16	12	(Czech Republic) Filip Salač	Elf Marc VDS Racing Team	Boscoscuro	1:51.393
17	28	(Spain) Izan Guevara	Blu Cru Pramac Yamaha Moto2	Boscoscuro	1:51.449
18	21	(Spain) Alonso López	Beta Tools SpeedRS Team	Boscoscuro	1:51.557
19	14	(Italy) Tony Arbolino	Blu Cru Pramac Yamaha Moto2	Boscoscuro	1:51.626
20	4	(Spain) Iván Ortolá	QJMotor – Frinsa – MSi	Boscoscuro	1:51.634
21	71	(Japan) Ayumu Sasaki	RW-Idrofoglia Racing GP	Kalex	1:51.677
22	11	(Spain) Alex Escrig	Klint Forward Factory Team	Forward	1:51.721
23	99	(Spain) Adrián Huertas	Italtrans Racing Team	Kalex	1:52:030
24	9	(Spain) Jorge Navarro	Klint Forward Factory Team	Forward	1:52.222
25	15	(South Africa) Darryn Binder	Italjet Gresini Moto2	Kalex	1:52.461
26	3	(Spain) Sergio García	QJMotor – Frinsa – MSi	Boscoscuro	1:52.572
27	92	(Japan) Yuki Kunii	Idemitsu Honda Team Asia	Kalex	1:52.794
28	41	(Thailand) Nakarin Atiratphuvapat	Idemitsu Honda Team Asia	Kalex	1:53.366
OFFICIAL MOTO2 PRACTICE TIMES REPORT

=== Moto3 ===
==== Combined Practice 1-2 ====
Fastest session lap

Pos.	No.	Biker	Team	Constructor	Practice times	
Pos.	No.	Biker	Team	Constructor	P1	P2
1	22	(Spain) David Almansa	Leopard Racing	Honda	1:59.104	**1:56.922**
2	28	(Spain) Máximo Quiles	CFMoto Viel Aspar Team	KTM	1:59.131	1:57.049
3	58	(Italy) Luca Lunetta	Sic58 Squadra Corse	Honda	2:00.233	1:57.079
4	31	(Spain) Adrián Fernández	Leopard Racing	Honda	1:59.338	1:57.335
5	99	(Spain) José Antonio Rueda	Red Bull KTM Ajo	KTM	**1:58.014**	1:57.602
6	64	(Spain) David Muñoz	Liqui Moly Dynavolt Intact GP	KTM	1:59.582	1:57.609
7	6	(Japan) Ryusei Yamanaka	Frinsa – MT Helmets – MSI	KTM	2:00.143	1:57.821
8	66	(Australia) Joel Kelso	LEVELUP-MTA	KTM	1:59.428	1:57.868
9	19	(United Kingdom) Scott Ogden	CIP Green Power	KTM	1:59.755	1:57.963
10	36	(Spain) Ángel Piqueras	Frinsa – MT Helmets – MSI	KTM	2:00.048	1:58.076
11	83	(Spain) Álvaro Carpe	Red Bull KTM Ajo	KTM	2:00.194	1:58.152
12	72	(Japan) Taiyo Furusato	Honda Team Asia	Honda	2:01.667	1:58.298
13	82	(Italy) Stefano Nepa	Sic58 Squadra Corse	Honda	2:01.221	1:58.318
14	55	(Switzerland) Noah Dettwiler	CIP Green Power	KTM	2:00.243	1:58.323
15	14	(New Zealand) Cormac Buchanan	Denssi Racing – BOE	KTM	1:59.369	1:58.538
16	21	(South Africa) Ruché Moodley	Denssi Racing – BOE	KTM	1:59.732	1:58.634
17	10	(Italy) Nicola Carraro	Rivacold Snipers Team	Honda	2:00.233	1:58.695
18	94	(Italy) Guido Pini	Liqui Moly Dynavolt Intact GP	KTM	1:58.939	1:58.736
19	5	(Thailand) Tatchakorn Buasri	Honda Team Asia	Honda	N/A	1:58.930
20	73	(Argentina) Valentín Perrone	Red Bull KTM Tech3	KTM	2:00.216	1:59.073
21	71	(Italy) Dennis Foggia	CFMoto Viel Aspar Team	KTM	1:59.574	1:59.148
22	89	(Spain) Marcos Uriarte	GRYD - Mlav Racing	KTM	2:02.202	1:59.172
23	54	(Italy) Riccardo Rossi	Rivacold Snipers Team	Honda	2:00.708	1:59.286
24	12	(Australia) Jacob Roulstone	Red Bull KTM Tech3	KTM	2:01.664	1:59.581
25	32	(Spain) Vicente Pérez	LEVELUP-MTA	KTM	2:01.831	1:59.736
26	8	(United Kingdom) Eddie O'Shea	GRYD - Mlav Racing	Honda	2:02.349	2:00.040
OFFICIAL MOTO3 FREE PRACTICE TIMES REPORT

==== Practice ====
The top 14 riders (written in bold) qualified for Q2.

Pos.	No.	Biker	Team	Constructor	Practice times
Pos.	No.	Biker	Team	Constructor	P1
1	99	(Spain) **José Antonio Rueda**	**Red Bull KTM Ajo**	**KTM**	**1:57.338**
2	64	(Spain) **David Muñoz**	**Liqui Moly Dynavolt Intact GP**	**KTM**	1:57.416
3	22	(Spain) **David Almansa**	**Leopard Racing**	**Honda**	1:57.639
4	83	(Spain) **Álvaro Carpe**	**Red Bull KTM Ajo**	**KTM**	1:57.661
5	31	(Spain) Adrián Fernández	Leopard Racing	Honda	1:57.881
6	66	(Australia) **Joel Kelso**	**LEVELUP-MTA**	**KTM**	1:58.147
7	12	(Australia) **Jacob Roulstone**	**Red Bull KTM Tech3**	**KTM**	1:58.150
8	36	(Spain) **Ángel Piqueras**	**Frinsa – MT Helmets – MSI**	**KTM**	1:58.185
9	10	(Italy) **Nicola Carraro**	**Rivacold Snipers Team**	**Honda**	1:58.398
10	58	(Italy) **Luca Lunetta**	**Sic58 Squadra Corse**	**Honda**	1:58.402
11	73	(Argentina) **Valentín Perrone**	**Red Bull KTM Tech3**	**KTM**	1:58.461
12	19	(United Kingdom) **Scott Ogden**	**CIP Green Power**	**KTM**	1:58.594
13	14	(New Zealand) **Cormac Buchanan**	**Denssi Racing – BOE**	**KTM**	1:58.594
14	21	(South Africa) **Ruché Moodley**	**Denssi Racing – BOE**	**KTM**	1:58.629
15	72	(Japan) Taiyo Furusato	Honda Team Asia	Honda	1:58.647
16	54	(Italy) Riccardo Rossi	Rivacold Snipers Team	Honda	1:58.833
17	71	(Italy) Dennis Foggia	CFMoto Viel Aspar Team	KTM	1:58.926
18	6	(Japan) Ryusei Yamanaka	Frinsa – MT Helmets – MSI	KTM	1:59.091
19	94	(Italy) Guido Pini	Liqui Moly Dynavolt Intact GP	KTM	1:59.156
20	32	(Spain) Vicente Pérez	LEVELUP-MTA	KTM	1:59.208
21	28	(Spain) Máximo Quiles	CFMoto Viel Aspar Team	KTM	1:59.263
22	82	(Italy) Stefano Nepa	Sic58 Squadra Corse	Honda	1:59.712
23	5	(Thailand) Tatchakorn Buasri	Honda Team Asia	Honda	1:59.796
24	8	(United Kingdom) Eddie O'Shea	GRYD - Mlav Racing	Honda	1:59.883
25	55	(Switzerland) Noah Dettwiler	CIP Green Power	KTM	2:00.214
26	89	(Spain) Marcos Uriarte	GRYD - Mlav Racing	KTM	2:00.804
OFFICIAL MOTO3 PRACTICE TIMES REPORT

== Qualifying ==
=== MotoGP ===
Fastest session lap

Pos.	No.	Biker	Team	Constructor	Qualifying times		Final grid	Row
Pos.	No.	Biker	Team	Constructor	Q1	Q2	Final grid	Row
1	93	(Spain) Marc Márquez	Ducati Lenovo Team	Ducati	Qualified in Q2	1:45.704	1	1
2	73	(Spain) Álex Márquez	BK8 Gresini Racing MotoGP	Ducati	Qualified in Q2	1:45.964	2	1
3	21	(Italy) Franco Morbidelli	Pertamina Enduro VR46 Racing Team	Ducati	Qualified in Q2	1:45.984	3	1
4	63	(Italy) Francesco Bagnaia	Ducati Lenovo Team	Ducati	Qualified in Q2	1:46.307	4	2
5	37	(Spain) Pedro Acosta	Red Bull KTM Factory Racing	KTM	Qualified in Q2	1:46.333	5	2
6	33	(South Africa) Brad Binder	Red Bull KTM Factory Racing	KTM	Qualified in Q2	1:46.333	6	2
7	54	(Spain) Fermín Aldeguer	BK8 Gresini Racing MotoGP	Ducati	Qualified in Q2	1:46.360	7	3
8	12	(Spain) Maverick Viñales	Red Bull KTM Tech3	KTM	Qualified in Q2	1:46.434	8	3
9	20	(France) Fabio Quartararo	Monster Energy Yamaha MotoGP Team	Yamaha	1:46.631	1:46.441	9	3
10	49	(Italy) Fabio Di Giannantonio	Pertamina Enduro VR46 Racing Team	Ducati	1:46.610	1:46.703	10	4
11	36	(Spain) Joan Mir	Honda HRC Castrol	Honda	Qualified in Q2	1:46.773	11	4
12	5	(France) Johann Zarco	Castrol Honda LCR	Honda	Qualified in Q2	1:46.775	12	4
13	25	(Spain) Raúl Fernández	Trackhouse MotoGP Team	Aprilia	1:46.711	N/A	13	5
14	43	(Australia) Jack Miller	Prima Pramac Yamaha MotoGP	Yamaha	1:46.737	N/A	14	5
15	42	(Spain) Álex Rins	Monster Energy Yamaha MotoGP Team	Yamaha	1:46.764	N/A	15	5
16	88	(Portugal) Miguel Oliveira	Prima Pramac Yamaha MotoGP	Yamaha	1:47.394	N/A	16	6
17	23	(Italy) Enea Bastianini	Red Bull KTM Tech3	KTM	1:47.453	N/A	17	6
18	7	(Spain) Augusto Fernández	Yamaha Factory Racing	Honda	1:47.474	N/A	18	6
19	32	(Italy) Lorenzo Savadori	Aprilia Racing	Aprilia	1:47.620	N/A	19	7
20	72	(Italy) Marco Bezzecchi	Aprilia Racing	Aprilia	1:47.684	N/A	20	7
21	35	(Thailand) Somkiat Chantra	IDEMITSU Honda LCR	Honda	1:48.284	N/A	21	7
OFFICIAL MOTOGP QUALIFYING TIMES REPORT

=== Moto2 ===
Fastest session lap

Pos.	No.	Biker	Team	Constructor	Qualifying times		Final grid	Row
Pos.	No.	Biker	Team	Constructor	P1	P2	Final grid	Row
1	10	(Brazil) Diogo Moreira	Italtrans Racing Team	Kalex	Qualified in Q2	1:49.940	1	1
2	7	(Belgium) Barry Baltus	Fantic Racing Lino Sonego	Kalex	Qualified in Q2	1:50.162	2	1
3	53	(Turkey) Deniz Öncü	Red Bull KTM Ajo	Kalex	Qualified in Q2	1:50.166	3	1
4	44	(Spain) Arón Canet	Fantic Racing Lino Sonego	Kalex	Qualified in Q2	1:50.220	4	2
5	27	(Spain) Daniel Holgado	CFMoto Inde Aspar Team	Kalex	Qualified in Q2	1:50.407	5	2
6	80	(Colombia) David Alonso	CFMoto Inde Aspar Team	Kalex	Qualified in Q2	1:50.471	6	2
7	12	(Czech Republic) Filip Salač	Elf Marc VDS Racing Team	Boscoscuro	1:50.822	1:50.500	7	3
8	84	(Netherlands) Zonta van den Goorbergh	RW-Idrofoglia Racing GP	Kalex	Qualified in Q2	1:50.502	8	3
9	16	(United States) Joe Roberts	OnlyFans American Racing Team	Kalex	Qualified in Q2	1:50.609	9	3
10	21	(Spain) Alonso López	Folladore SpeedRS Team	Boscoscuro	1:50.509	1:50.669	10	4
11	14	(Italy) Tony Arbolino	Blu Cru Pramac Yamaha Moto2	Boscoscuro	1:50.731	1:50.686	11	4
12	75	(Spain) Albert Arenas	Italjet Gresini Moto2	Kalex	Qualified in Q2	1:50.705	12	4
13	81	(Australia) Senna Agius	Liqui Moly Dynavolt Intact GP	Kalex	Qualified in Q2	1:50.778	13	5
14	96	(United Kingdom) Jake Dixon	Elf Marc VDS Racing Team	Boscoscuro	Qualified in Q2	1:50.796	14	5
15	24	(Spain) Marcos Ramírez	OnlyFans American Racing Team	Kalex	Qualified in Q2	1:50.815	15	5
16	28	(Spain) Izan Guevara	Blu Cru Pramac Yamaha Moto2	Boscoscuro	1:50.600	1:50.925	16	6
17	17	(Spain) Daniel Muñoz	Red Bull KTM Ajo	Kalex	Qualified in Q2	1:50.983	17	6
18	18	(Spain) Manuel González	Liqui Moly Dynavolt Intact GP	Kalex	Qualified in Q2	N/A	18	6
19	13	(Italy) Celestino Vietti	Folladore SpeedRS Team	Boscoscuro	1:51.190	N/A	19	7
20	4	(Spain) Iván Ortolá	QJMotor – Frinsa – MSi	Boscoscuro	1:51.211	N/A	20	7
21	71	(Japan) Ayumu Sasaki	RW-Idrofoglia Racing GP	Kalex	1:51.292	N/A	21	7
22	11	(Spain) Alex Escrig	Klint Forward Factory Team	Forward	1:51.419	N/A	22	8
23	3	(Spain) Sergio García	QJMotor – Frinsa – MSi	Boscoscuro	1:51.482	N/A	23	8
24	99	(Spain) Adrián Huertas	Italtrans Racing Team	Kalex	1:51.497	N/A	24	8
25	9	(Spain) Jorge Navarro	Klint Forward Factory Team	Forward	1:51.516	N/A	28	10
26	92	(Japan) Yuki Kunii	Idemitsu Honda Team Asia	Kalex	1:51.849	N/A	25	9
27	15	(South Africa) Darryn Binder	Italjet Gresini Moto2	Kalex	1:52.000	N/A	26	9
28	41	(Thailand) Nakarin Atiratphuvapat	Idemitsu Honda Team Asia	Kalex	1:53.497	N/A	27	9
OFFICIAL MOTO2 QUALIFYING TIMES REPORT

=== Moto3 ===
Fastest session lap

Pos.	No.	Biker	Team	Constructor	Qualifying times		Final grid	Row
Pos.	No.	Biker	Team	Constructor	P1	P2	Final grid	Row
1	99	(Spain) José Antonio Rueda	Red Bull KTM Ajo	KTM	Qualified in Q2	1:56.361	1	1
2	58	(Italy) Luca Lunetta	Sic58 Squadra Corse	Honda	Qualified in Q2	1:56.387	2	1
3	28	(Spain) Máximo Quiles	CFMoto Inde Aspar Team	KTM	1:57.406	1:56.505	3	1
4	83	(Spain) Álvaro Carpe	Red Bull KTM Ajo	KTM	Qualified in Q2	1:56.763	4	2
5	72	(Japan) Taiyo Furusato	Honda Team Asia	Honda	1:57.808	1:56.868	5	2
6	12	(Australia) Jacob Roulstone	Red Bull KTM Tech3	KTM	Qualified in Q2	1:56.993	6	2
7	22	(Spain) David Almansa	Leopard Racing	Honda	Qualified in Q2	1:57.192	7	3
8	66	(Australia) Joel Kelso	LEVELUP-MTA	KTM	Qualified in Q2	1:57.230	8	3
9	64	(Spain) David Muñoz	Liqui Moly Dynavolt Intact GP	KTM	Qualified in Q2	1:57.335	9	3
10	36	(Spain) Ángel Piqueras	Frinsa – MT Helmets – MSI	KTM	Qualified in Q2	1:57.356	10	4
11	19	(United Kingdom) Scott Ogden	CIP Green Power	KTM	Qualified in Q2	1:57.386	11	4
12	6	(Japan) Ryusei Yamanaka	Frinsa – MT Helmets – MSI	KTM	1:57.771	1:57.433	12	4
13	14	(New Zealand) Cormac Buchanan	Denssi Racing – BOE	KTM	Qualified in Q2	1:57.749	13	5
14	21	(South Africa) Ruché Moodley	Denssi Racing – BOE	KTM	Qualified in Q2	1:57.767	14	5
15	73	(Argentina) Valentín Perrone	Red Bull KTM Tech3	KTM	Qualified in Q2	1:57.896	15	5
16	10	(Italy) Nicola Carraro	Rivacold Snipers Team	Honda	Qualified in Q2	1:58.095	16	6
17	32	(Spain) Vicente Pérez	LEVELUP-MTA	KTM	1:58.776	1:57.823	17	6
18	31	(Spain) Adrián Fernández	Leopard Racing	Honda	Qualified in Q2	N/A		
19	71	(Italy) Dennis Foggia	CFMoto Inde Aspar Team	KTM	1:57.906	N/A	18	6
20	82	(Italy) Stefano Nepa	Sic58 Squadra Corse	Honda	1:57.988	N/A	19	7
21	94	(Italy) Guido Pini	Liqui Moly Dynavolt Intact GP	KTM	1:58.130	N/A	20	7
22	5	(Thailand) Tatchakorn Buasri	Honda Team Asia	Honda	1:58.545	N/A	21	7
23	54	(Italy) Riccardo Rossi	Rivacold Snipers Team	Honda	1:58.816	N/A	22	8
24	8	(United Kingdom) Eddie O'Shea	GRYD - Mlav Racing	Honda	1:59.077	N/A	23	8
25	55	(Switzerland) Noah Dettwiler	CIP Green Power	KTM	1:59.133	N/A	24	8
26	30	(Spain) Marcos Uriarte	GRYD - Mlav Racing	KTM	1:59.202	N/A	25	9
OFFICIAL MOTO3 QUALIFYING TIMES REPORT

== MotoGP Sprint ==
The MotoGP Sprint was held on 7 June 2025.

Pos.	No.	Rider	Team	Manufacturer	Laps	Time/Retired	Grid	Points
1	93	(Spain) Marc Márquez	Ducati Lenovo Team	Ducati	11	19:43.026	1	12
2	73	(Spain) Álex Márquez	BK8 Gresini Racing MotoGP	Ducati	11	+2.080	2	9
3	54	(Spain) Fermín Aldeguer	BK8 Gresini Racing MotoGP	Ducati	11	+4.630	7	7
4	21	(Italy) Franco Morbidelli	Pertamina Enduro VR46 Racing Team	Ducati	11	+5.944	3	6
5	37	(Spain) Pedro Acosta	Red Bull KTM Factory Racing	KTM	11	+6.095	5	5
6	49	(Italy) Fabio Di Giannantonio	Pertamina Enduro VR46 Racing Team	Ducati	11	+6.379	10	4
7	12	(Spain) Maverick Viñales	Red Bull KTM Tech3	KTM	11	+7.213	8	3
8	72	(Italy) Marco Bezzecchi	Aprilia Racing	Aprilia	11	+8.343	20	2
9	33	(South Africa) Brad Binder	Red Bull KTM Factory Racing	KTM	11	+9.982	6	1
10	25	(Spain) Raúl Fernández	Trackhouse MotoGP Team	Aprilia	11	+11.427	13	
11	20	(France) Fabio Quartararo	Monster Energy Yamaha MotoGP Team	Yamaha	11	+13.331	9	
12	63	(Italy) Francesco Bagnaia	Ducati Lenovo Team	Ducati	11	+14.017	4	
13	43	(Australia) Jack Miller	Prima Pramac Yamaha MotoGP	Yamaha	11	+16.494	14	
14	42	(Spain) Álex Rins	Monster Energy Yamaha MotoGP Team	Yamaha	11	+17.202	15	
15	88	(Portugal) Miguel Oliveira	Prima Pramac Yamaha MotoGP	Yamaha	11	+18.287	16	
16	5	(France) Johann Zarco	Castrol Honda LCR	Honda	11	+19.284	12	
17	23	(Italy) Enea Bastianini	Red Bull KTM Tech3	KTM	11	+19.841	17	
18	32	(Italy) Lorenzo Savadori	Aprilia Racing	Aprilia	11	+23.763	19	
19	35	(Thailand) Somkiat Chantra	IDEMITSU Honda LCR	Honda	11	+31.069	21	
Ret	7	(Spain) Augusto Fernández	Yamaha Factory Racing	Yamaha	8	Technical issue	18	
Ret	36	(Spain) Joan Mir	Honda HRC Castrol	Honda	2	Accident damage	11	
Fastest sprint lap: (Spain) Álex Márquez (Ducati) – 1:46.906 (lap 4)
OFFICIAL MOTOGP SPRINT REPORT

== Warm Up ==
=== Warm Up MotoGP ===
Pos.	No.	Biker	Team	Constructor	
Pos.	No.	Biker	Team	Constructor	Time results
1	93	(Spain) Marc Márquez	Ducati Lenovo Team	Ducati	1:46.967
2	73	(Spain) Álex Márquez	BK8 Gresini Racing MotoGP	Ducati	1:46.986
3	37	(Spain) Pedro Acosta	Red Bull KTM Factory Racing	KTM	1:47.054
4	72	(Italy) Marco Bezzecchi	Aprilia Racing	Aprilia	1:47.059
5	23	(Italy) Enea Bastianini	Red Bull KTM Tech3	KTM	1:47.140
6	63	(Italy) Francesco Bagnaia	Ducati Lenovo Team	Ducati	1:47.315
7	54	(Spain) Fermín Aldeguer	BK8 Gresini Racing MotoGP	Ducati	1:47.316
8	12	(Spain) Maverick Viñales	Red Bull KTM Tech3	KTM	1:47.417
9	5	(France) Johann Zarco	CASTROL Honda LCR	Honda	1:47.420
10	33	(South Africa) Brad Binder	Red Bull KTM Factory Racing	KTM	1:47.484
11	21	(Italy) Franco Morbidelli	Pertamina Enduro VR46 Racing Team	Ducati	1:47.624
12	88	(Portugal) Miguel Oliveira	Prima Pramac Yamaha MotoGP	Yamaha	1:47.838
13	43	(Australia) Jack Miller	Prima Pramac Yamaha MotoGP	Yamaha	1:47.845
14	20	(France) Fabio Quartararo	Monster Energy Yamaha MotoGP Team	Yamaha	1:47.845
15	36	(Spain) Joan Mir	Honda HRC Castrol	Honda	1:48.012
16	49	(Italy) Fabio Di Giannantonio	Pertamina Enduro VR46 Racing Team	Ducati	1:48.051
17	25	(Spain) Raúl Fernández	Trackhouse MotoGP Team	Aprilia	1:48.552
18	7	(Spain) Augusto Fernández	Yamaha Factory Racing	Yamaha	1:48.884
19	42	(Spain) Álex Rins	Monster Energy Yamaha MotoGP Team	Yamaha	1:49.203
20	35	(Thailand) Somkiat Chantra	Idemitsu Honda LCR	Honda	1:49.971
21	32	(Italy) Lorenzo Savadori	Aprilia Racing	Aprilia	1:50.948
OFFICIAL MOTOGP WARM UP TIMES REPORT

== Race ==
=== MotoGP ===
Pos.	No.	Rider	Team	Manufacturer	Laps	Time/Retired	Grid	Points
1	93	(Spain) Marc Márquez	Ducati Lenovo Team	Ducati	23	41:11.195	1	25
2	73	(Spain) Álex Márquez	BK8 Gresini Racing MotoGP	Ducati	23	+1.107	2	20
3	63	(Italy) Francesco Bagnaia	Ducati Lenovo Team	Ducati	23	+2.029	4	16
4	37	(Spain) Pedro Acosta	Red Bull KTM Factory Racing	KTM	23	+7.657	5	13
5	21	(Italy) Franco Morbidelli	Pertamina Enduro VR46 Racing Team	Ducati	23	+10.363	3	11
6	54	(Spain) Fermín Aldeguer	BK8 Gresini Racing MotoGP	Ducati	23	+11.889	7	10
7	36	(Spain) Joan Mir	Honda HRC Castrol	Honda	23	+14.938	11	9
8	72	(Italy) Marco Bezzecchi	Aprilia Racing	Aprilia	23	+16.022	20	8
9	49	(Italy) Fabio Di Giannantonio	Pertamina Enduro VR46 Racing Team	Ducati	23	+18.321	10	7
10	25	(Spain) Raúl Fernández	Trackhouse MotoGP Team	Aprilia	23	+19.190	13	6
11	42	(Spain) Álex Rins	Monster Energy Yamaha MotoGP Team	Yamaha	23	+19.646	15	5
12	23	(Italy) Enea Bastianini	Red Bull KTM Tech3	KTM	23	+24.624	17	4
13	7	(Spain) Augusto Fernández	Yamaha Factory Racing	Yamaha	23	+25.986	18	3
14	43	(Australia) Jack Miller	Prima Pramac Yamaha MotoGP	Yamaha	23	+26.761	14	2
15	88	(Portugal) Miguel Oliveira	Prima Pramac Yamaha MotoGP	Yamaha	23	+27.122	16	1
16	35	(Thailand) Somkiat Chantra	IDEMITSU Honda LCR	Honda	23	+37.117	21	
17	32	(Italy) Lorenzo Savadori	Aprilia Racing	Aprilia	23	+43.588	19	
18	12	(Spain) Maverick Viñales	Red Bull KTM Tech3	KTM	23	+1:26.319	8	
Ret	20	(France) Fabio Quartararo	Monster Energy Yamaha MotoGP Team	Yamaha	12	Crashed out	9	
Ret	33	(South Africa) Brad Binder	Red Bull KTM Factory Racing	KTM	11	Crashed out	6	
Ret	5	(France) Johann Zarco	Castrol Honda LCR	Honda	8	Crashed out	12	
Fastest lap: (Spain) Marc Márquez (Ducati) – 1:46.705 (lap 21)
OFFICIAL MOTOGP RACE REPORT

=== Moto2 ===
Pos.	No.	Rider	Team	Manufacturer	Laps	Time/Retired	Grid	Points
1	53	(Turkey) Deniz Öncü	Red Bull KTM Ajo	Kalex	19	35:12.600	3	25
2	10	(Brazil) Diogo Moreira	Italtrans Racing Team	Kalex	19	+0.003	1	20
3	7	(Belgium) Barry Baltus	Fantic Racing Lino Sonego	Kalex	19	+1.949	2	16
4	81	(Australia) Senna Agius	Liqui Moly Dynavolt Intact GP	Kalex	19	+5.196	13	13
5	12	(Czech Republic) Filip Salač	Elf Marc VDS Racing Team	Boscoscuro	19	+5.926	7	11
6	44	(Spain) Arón Canet	Fantic Racing Lino Sonego	Kalex	19	+6.275	4	10
7	16	(United States) Joe Roberts	OnlyFans American Racing Team	Kalex	19	+9.192	9	9
8	24	(Spain) Marcos Ramírez	OnlyFans American Racing Team	Kalex	19	+9.252	15	8
9	18	(Spain) Manuel González	Liqui Moly Dynavolt Intact GP	Kalex	19	+9.296	18	7
10	21	(Spain) Alonso López	Folladore SpeedRS Team	Boscoscuro	19	+12.144	10	6
11	28	(Spain) Izan Guevara	Blu Cru Pramac Yamaha Moto2	Boscoscuro	19	+14.601	16	5
12	75	(Spain) Albert Arenas	Italjet Gresini Moto2	Kalex	19	+15.442	12	4
13	96	(United Kingdom) Jake Dixon	Elf Marc VDS Racing Team	Boscoscuro	19	+15.601	14	3
14	4	(Spain) Iván Ortolá	QJMotor – Frinsa – MSi	Boscoscuro	19	+17.549	20	2
15	17	(Spain) Daniel Muñoz	Red Bull KTM Ajo	Kalex	19	+17.601	17	1
16	84	(Netherlands) Zonta van den Goorbergh	RW-Idrofoglia Racing GP	Kalex	19	+18.658	8	
17	14	(Italy) Tony Arbolino	Blu Cru Pramac Yamaha Moto2	Boscoscuro	19	+19.376	11	
18	13	(Italy) Celestino Vietti	Folladore SpeedRS Team	Boscoscuro	19	+24.741	19	
19	99	(Spain) Adrián Huertas	Italtrans Racing Team	Kalex	19	+24.854	24	
20	3	(Spain) Sergio García	QJMotor – Frinsa – MSi	Boscoscuro	19	+26.598	23	
21	11	(Spain) Alex Escrig	Klint Forward Factory Team	Forward	19	+32.757	22	
22	92	(Japan) Yuki Kunii	Idemitsu Honda Team Asia	Kalex	19	+36.701	25	
23	9	(Spain) Jorge Navarro	Klint Forward Factory Team	Forward	19	+42.372	28	
24	41	(Thailand) Nakarin Atiratphuvapat	Idemitsu Honda Team Asia	Kalex	19	+1:42.053	27	
Ret	71	(Japan) Ayumu Sasaki	RW-Idrofoglia Racing GP	Kalex	13	Crashed out	21	
Ret	15	(South Africa) Darryn Binder	Italjet Gresini Moto2	Kalex	5	Technical	26	
Ret	27	(Spain) Daniel Holgado	CFMoto Inde Aspar Team	Kalex	0	Crashed out	5	
Ret	80	(Colombia) David Alonso	CFMoto Inde Aspar Team	Kalex	0	Crashed out	6	
Fastest lap: (Brazil) Diogo Moreira (Kalex) - 1:50.327 (lap 18)
OFFICIAL MOTO2 RACE REPORT

=== Moto3 ===
Pos.	No.	Rider	Team	Manufacturer	Laps	Time/Retired	Grid	Points
1	64	(Spain) David Muñoz	Liqui Moly Dynavolt Intact GP	KTM	17	33:33.745	9	25
2	28	(Spain) Máximo Quiles	CFMoto Inde Aspar Team	KTM	17	+0.050	3	20
3	83	(Spain) Álvaro Carpe	Red Bull KTM Ajo	KTM	17	+0.381	4	16
4	22	(Spain) David Almansa	Leopard Racing	Honda	17	+0.459	7	13
5	58	(Italy) Luca Lunetta	Sic58 Squadra Corse	Honda	17	+0.636	2	11
6	36	(Spain) Ángel Piqueras	Frinsa – MT Helmets – MSI	KTM	17	+0.690	10	10
7	66	(Australia) Joel Kelso	LEVELUP-MTA	KTM	17	+0.739	8	9
8	99	(Spain) José Antonio Rueda	Red Bull KTM Ajo	KTM	17	+0.860	1	8
9	6	(Japan) Ryusei Yamanaka	Frinsa – MT Helmets – MSI	KTM	17	+1.160	12	7
10	14	(New Zealand) Cormac Buchanan	Denssi Racing – BOE	KTM	17	+1.729	13	6
11	72	(Japan) Taiyo Furusato	Honda Team Asia	Honda	17	+3.639	5	5
12	19	(United Kingdom) Scott Ogden	CIP Green Power	KTM	17	+6.517	11	4
13	73	(Argentina) Valentín Perrone	Red Bull KTM Tech3	KTM	17	+6.581	15	3
14	21	(South Africa) Ruché Moodley	Denssi Racing – BOE	KTM	17	+7.253	14	2
15	71	(Italy) Dennis Foggia	CFMoto Inde Aspar Team	KTM	17	+15.449	18	1
16	55	(Switzerland) Noah Dettwiler	CIP Green Power	KTM	17	+22.739	24	
17	10	(Italy) Nicola Carraro	Rivacold Snipers Team	Honda	17	+22.860	16	
18	54	(Italy) Riccardo Rossi	Rivacold Snipers Team	Honda	17	+23.415	22	
19	94	(Italy) Guido Pini	Liqui Moly Dynavolt Intact GP	KTM	17	+23.531	20	
20	5	(Thailand) Tatchakorn Buasri	Honda Team Asia	Honda	17	+26.687	21	
21	8	(United Kingdom) Eddie O'Shea	GRYD - Mlav Racing	Honda	17	+29.640	23	
22	32	(Spain) Vicente Pérez	LEVELUP-MTA	KTM	17	+48.777	17	
23	89	(Spain) Marcos Uriarte	GRYD - Mlav Racing	KTM	16	+1 lap	25	
NC	82	(Italy) Stefano Nepa	Sic58 Squadra Corse	Honda	12	+5 Laps	19	
Ret	12	(Australia) Jacob Roulstone	Red Bull KTM Tech3	KTM	7	Technical	6	
Fastest lap: (Italy) Luca Lunetta (Honda) - 1:56.912 (lap 6)
OFFICIAL MOTO3 RACE REPORT

== Championship standings after the race ==
Below are the standings for the top five riders, constructors, and teams after the round.

=== MotoGP ===
Riders' Championship standings

	Pos.	Rider	Points
	1	(Spain) Marc Márquez	233
	2	(Spain) Álex Márquez	201
	3	(Italy) Francesco Bagnaia	140
	4	(Italy) Franco Morbidelli	115
1	5	(Italy) Fabio Di Giannantonio	99

Constructors' Championship standings

	Pos.	Constructor	Points
	1	(Italy) Ducati	282
	2	(Japan) Honda	119
1	3	(Austria) KTM	106
1	4	(Italy) Aprilia	103
	5	(Japan) Yamaha	89

Teams' Championship standings

	Pos.	Team	Points
	1	(Italy) Ducati Lenovo Team	373
	2	(Italy) BK8 Gresini Racing MotoGP	274
	3	(Italy) Pertamina Enduro VR46 Racing Team	214
1	4	(Austria) Red Bull KTM Factory Racing	111
1	5	(Monaco) LCR Honda	97

=== Moto2 ===
Riders' Championship standings

	Pos.	Rider	Points
	1	(Spain) Manuel González	118
	2	(Spain) Arón Canet	118
2	3	(Brazil) Diogo Moreira	90
	4	(Belgium) Barry Baltus	89
2	5	(United Kingdom) Jake Dixon	85

Constructors' Championship standings

Pos.	Constructor	Points
1	(Germany) Kalex	183
2	(Italy) Boscoscuro	110
3	(Switzerland) Forward	11

Teams' Championship standings

Pos.	Team	Points
1	(Italy) Fantic Racing Lino Sonego	207
2	(Germany) Liqui Moly Dynavolt Intact GP	195
3	(Belgium) Elf Marc VDS Racing Team	133
4	(Italy) Beta Tools SpeedRS Team	100
5	(Italy) Italtrans Racing Team	95

=== Moto3 ===
Riders' Championship standings

Pos.	Rider	Points
1	(Spain) José Antonio Rueda	149
2	(Spain) Ángel Piqueras	97
3	(Australia) Joel Kelso	86
4	(Spain) Álvaro Carpe	85
5	(Japan) Taiyo Furusato	67

Constructors' Championship standings

Pos.	Constructor	Points
1	(Austria) KTM	200
2	(Japan) Honda	116

Teams' Championship standings

	Pos.	Team	Points
	1	(Finland) Red Bull KTM Ajo	234
	2	(Spain) Frinsa – MT Helmets – MSi	146
	3	(Italy) LevelUp – MTA	133
	4	(Luxembourg) Leopard Racing	117
1	5	(Spain) CFMoto Viel Aspar Team	93

Previous race: 2025 British Grand Prix	FIM Grand Prix World Championship; 2025 season	Next race: 2025 Italian Grand Prix
Previous race: 2024 Aragon Grand Prix	Aragon motorcycle Grand Prix	Next race: 2026 Aragon Grand Prix
