= José Antonio Rueda =

Spanish motorcycle racer (born 2005)

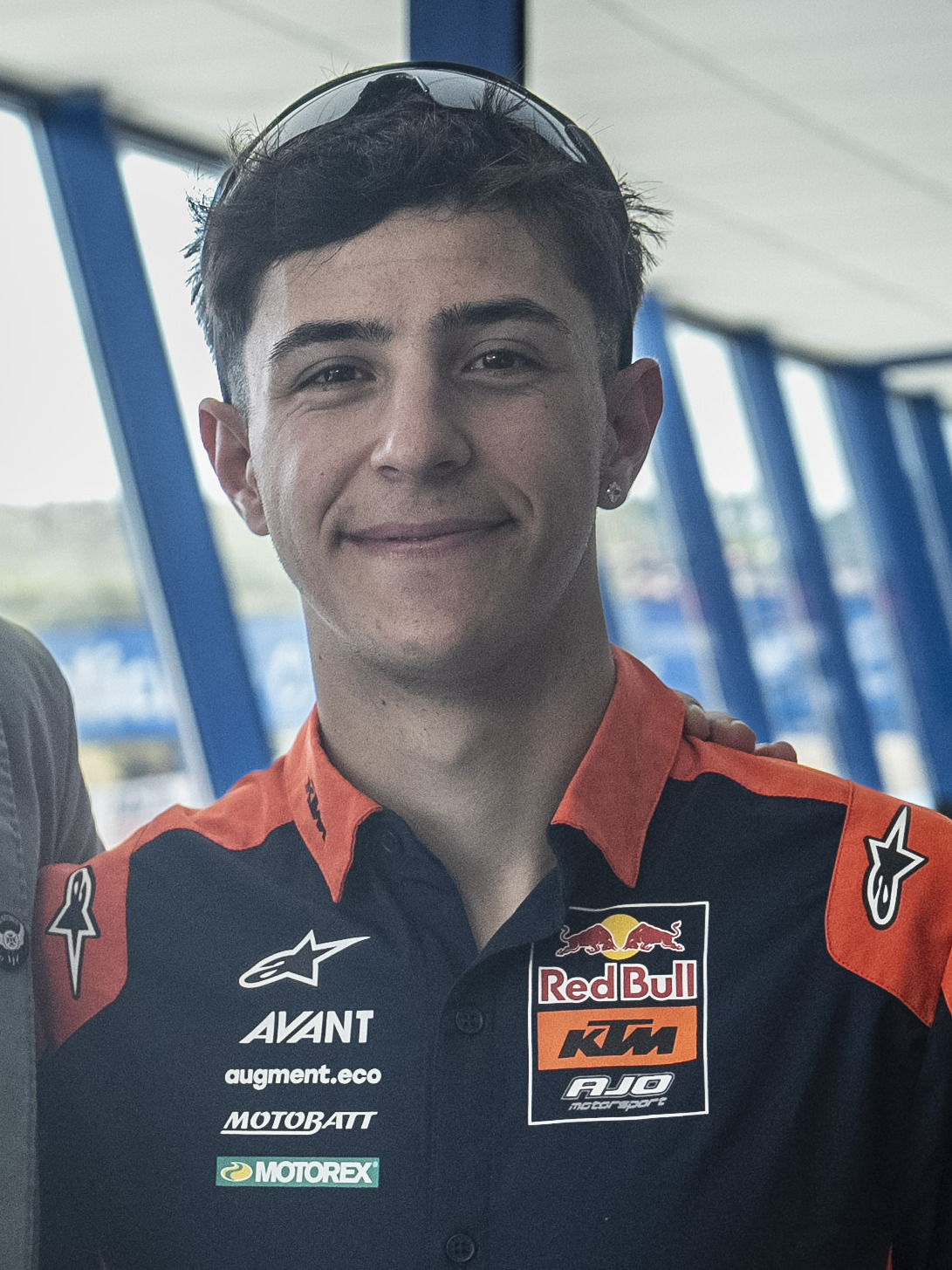
- Rueda in 2025
- Nationality: Spanish
- Born: 29 October 2005 (age 21); Los Palacios y Villafranca, Spain
- Current team: Red Bull KTM Ajo
- Bike number: 98
Motorcycle racing career statistics
Moto2 World Championship
Active years	2026–
Manufacturers	Kalex
Starts / Wins / Podiums / Poles / F. laps / Points; 19 / 0 / 0 / 0 / 0 / 56
Moto3 World Championship
Active years	2021–2025
Manufacturers	Honda (2021–2022); KTM (2023–2025)
Championships	1 (2025)
2025 championship position	1st (365 pts)
Starts / Wins / Podiums / Poles / F. laps / Points; 59 / 11 / 19 / 6 / 6 / 643

José Antonio Rueda Ruiz (born 29 October 2005) is a Spanish motorcycle racer who competes for Red Bull KTM Ajo in the Moto2 World Championship. He is the 2022 JuniorGP and 2022 Red Bull Rookies champion. He won the 2025 Moto3 World Championship after a red flagged Indonesian GP race and became the first Andalusian rider to win a Grand Prix motorcycle racing championship.

== Personal life ==
Rueda was born in Los Chapatales, a hamlet located outside Los Palacios y Villafranca in the Province of Seville.

== Career ==
=== Early career ===
In 2021, Rueda made his debut in the FIM JuniorGP World Championship racing for Honda. In his first season he obtained two podiums and finished eighth in the standings. For the Valencian Community Grand Prix he was called by the Indonesian Racing Gresini team to race in Moto3. He was forced to retire in his debut in the world championship.

The following year, Rueda remained in the JuniorGP series by moving to the Estrella Galicia 0,0 team. His second season proved to be very positive, obtaining five victories and winning the championship. The same year he participated in the MotoGP Rookies Cup, Rueda obtained three victories and became champion ahead of Collin Veijer. He also returned to the world championship, racing in the French Grand Prix for the Rivacold Snipers team, where he finished twenty-first on the Honda NSF250R.

=== Moto3 World Championship ===
For the 2023 season, Rueda was hired by the Red Bull KTM Ajo team for his first full season in Moto3. He immediately proved to be fast from the tests on the Portimão circuit and in the first race of the season in Portimão he obtained his first points in the MotoGP championship, finishing fourth. He achieved his first podium at the Catalan Grand Prix and, with one hundred and twenty-one points, he finished in ninth place.

The following year, Rueda remained with the team for his second full season in Moto3. In Portugal he obtained the pole position and in the race he obtained his second podium in Moto3, finishing second behind Daniel Holgado. Shortly before the Grand Prix of the Americas, the rider was forced to undergo emergency surgery on his appendix. After missing only two Grands Prix, he returned to the world championship and, at the Aragon Grand Prix, he achieved his first world championship victory and then finished the championship in seventh position.

During a sighting lap ahead of the 2025 Malaysian Grand Prix, Rueda crashed heavily into the back of Noah Dettwiler's bike. Both of them suffered severe injuries and were airlifted by helicopter from the track to a local hospital. Rueda suffered a fracture to his hand and a severe concussion.

=== Moto2 World Championship ===
==== Red Bull KTM Ajo (2026–) ====
On 17 September 2025, it was announced that Rueda would move up to Moto2 with the Red Bull KTM Ajo team for the 2026 season, to replace the outgoing Deniz Öncü.

Rueda will remain with Red Bull KTM Ajo into the 2027 season alongside Collin Veijer.

== Career statistics ==
=== European Talent Cup ===
==== Races by year ====
(key) (Races in bold indicate pole position; races in italics indicate fastest lap)

Year	Bike	1	2	3	4	5	6	7	8	9	10	11	Pts	Pos
2018	Honda	EST1; 17	EST2; 8	VAL1; Ret	VAL2; 13	CAT; 3	**ARA1**; 1	**ARA2**; 6	JER1; 3	JER2; Ret	ALB; Ret	**VAL**; 2	4th	98
2019	Honda	**EST**; Ret	**EST**; 7	VAL; 8	VAL; 6	CAT; 5	ARA; 11	ARA; 2	JER; 4	JER; 5	ALB; 1	VAL; 6	4th	122

=== FIM CEV Moto3 Junior World Championship ===
==== Races by year ====
(key) (Races in bold indicate pole position, races in italics indicate fastest lap)

Year	Bike	1	2	3	4	5	6	7	8	9	10	11	12	Pos	Pts
2020	Honda	EST; 22	POR; 22	JER1; 6	JER2; 12	JER3; 11	ARA1; 12	ARA2; 13	ARA3; 10	VAL1; Ret	VAL2; 11	VAL3; 7		12th	46
2021	Honda	EST; 15	VAL1; 10	VAL2; 13	CAT1; 3	CAT2; 6	POR; 4	**ARA**; 2	JER1; Ret	JER2; DNS	RSM; 19	VAL3; Ret	VAL4; 15	8th	70
2022	Honda	**EST**; 2	**VAL1**; 4	**VAL2**; 1	**CAT1**; 1	**CAT2**; 1	JER1; 2	JER1; 1	POR; 1	RSM; 2	ARA; 3	VAL3; 4	VAL4; 5	1st	238

=== Red Bull MotoGP Rookies Cup ===
==== Races by year ====
(key) (Races in bold indicate pole position, races in italics indicate fastest lap)

Year	1	2	3	4	5	6	7	8	9	10	11	12	13	14	Pos	Pts
2022	POR1; 1	POR2; 2	**SPA1**; 1	**SPA2**; 3	MUG1; 11	MUG2; 6	**GER1**; 1	**GER2**; 4	RBR1; 2	RBR2; 4	**ARA1**; 2	**ARA1**; 6	VAL1; 4	VAL2; 7	1st	221

=== Grand Prix motorcycle racing ===
==== By season ====
Season	Class	Motorcycle	Team	Race	Win	Podium	Pole	FLap	Pts	Plcd
2021	Moto3	Honda	Indonesian Racing Gresini Moto3	1	0	0	0	0	0	NC
2022	Moto3	Honda	Rivacold Snipers Team	1	0	0	0	0	0	38th
2023	Moto3	KTM	Red Bull KTM Ajo	20	0	1	0	0	121	9th
2024	Moto3	KTM	Red Bull KTM Ajo	18	1	4	1	2	157	7th
2025	Moto3	KTM	Red Bull KTM Ajo	19	10	14	5	4	365	**1st**
2026	Moto2	Kalex	Red Bull KTM Ajo	19	0	0	0	0	56*	16th*
Total				**78**	**11**	**19**	**6**	**6**	**699**	

==== By class ====
Class	Seasons	1st GP	1st pod	1st win	Race	Win	Podiums	Pole	FLap	Pts	WChmp
Moto3	2021–2025	2021 Valencia	2023 Catalonia	2024 Aragón	59	11	19	6	6	643	1
Moto2	2026–present	2026 Thailand			19	0	0	0	0	56	0
Total	2021–present				**78**	**11**	**19**	**6**	**6**	**699**	**1**

==== Races by year ====
(key) (Races in bold indicate pole position; races in italics indicate fastest lap)

Year	Class	Bike	1	2	3	4	5	6	7	8	9	10	11	12	13	14	15	16	17	18	19	20	21	22	Pos	Pts
2021	Moto3	Honda	QAT	DOH	POR	SPA	FRA	ITA	CAT	GER	NED	STY	AUT	GBR	ARA	RSM	AME	EMI	ALR	VAL; Ret					NC	0
2022	Moto3	Honda	QAT	INA	ARG	AME	POR	SPA	FRA; 21	ITA	CAT	GER	NED	GBR	AUT	RSM	ARA	JPN	THA	AUS	MAL	VAL			38th	0
2023	Moto3	KTM	POR; 4	ARG; 23	AME; 10	SPA; 5	FRA; 9	ITA; 14	GER; 13	NED; 6	GBR; 8	AUT; 11	CAT; 3	RSM; 9	IND; 10	JPN; 10	INA; 5	AUS; 18	THA; 16	MAL; Ret	QAT; 16	VAL; 6			9th	121
2024	Moto3	KTM	QAT; Ret	**POR**; 2	AME; DNS	SPA; WD	FRA; 8	CAT; 3	ITA; 15	NED; 4	GER; Ret	GBR; 9	AUT; 7	ARA; 1	RSM; Ret	EMI; 10	INA; 11	JPN; 5	AUS; 9	THA; 16	MAL; 3	SLD; 4			7th	157
2025	Moto3	KTM	THA; 1	ARG; 3	AME; 1	QAT; Ret	**SPA**; 1	FRA; 1	**GBR**; 1	**ARA**; 8	ITA; 4	**NED**; 1	GER; 3	CZE; 1	AUT; 5	HUN; 5	CAT; 2	RSM; 1	**JPN**; 2	INA; 1	AUS; 1	MAL; DNS	POR	VAL	1st	365
2026	Moto2	Kalex	THA; Ret	BRA; 21	USA; 15	SPA; 20	FRA; 17	CAT; 12	ITA; 13	HUN; 11	CZE; 10	NED; 17	GER; 8	GBR; 19	ARA; 17	RSM; 21	AUT; 12	JPN; 10	INA; 10	AUS; C	MAL; 11	QAT; 8	POR	VAL	16th*	56*

* Season still in progress.
