= 2021 Valencian Community motorcycle Grand Prix =

Eighteenth and final round of the 2021 Grand Prix motorcycle racing season

2021 Valencian Community Grand Prix
Race details
- Race 18 of 18 races in the 2021 Grand Prix motorcycle racing season
- Date: 14 November 2021
- Official name: Gran Premio Motul de la Comunitat Valenciana
- Location: Circuit Ricardo Tormo; Cheste, Valencia, Spain
- Course: Permanent racing facility; 4.005 km (2.489 mi)

MotoGP
Pole position
Rider	(Spain) Jorge Martín	Ducati
Time	1:29.936	
Fastest lap
Rider	(Italy) Francesco Bagnaia	Ducati
Time	1:31.042 on lap 16	
Podium
First	(Italy) Francesco Bagnaia	Ducati
Second	(Spain) Jorge Martín	Ducati
Third	(Australia) Jack Miller	Ducati

Moto2
Pole position
Rider	(Italy) Simone Corsi	MV Agusta
Time	1:34.956	
Fastest lap
Rider	(Spain) Raúl Fernández	Kalex
Time	1:35.356 on lap 16	
Podium
First	(Spain) Raúl Fernández	Kalex
Second	(Italy) Fabio Di Giannantonio	Kalex
Third	(Spain) Augusto Fernández	Kalex

Moto3
Pole position
Rider	(Spain) Pedro Acosta	KTM
Time	1:38.668	
Fastest lap
Rider	(Spain) Xavier Artigas	Honda
Time	1:39.287 on lap 2	
Podium
First	(Spain) Xavier Artigas	Honda
Second	(Spain) Sergio García	Gas Gas
Third	(Spain) Jaume Masià	KTM

The 2021 Valencian Community motorcycle Grand Prix (officially known as the Gran Premio Motul de la Comunitat Valenciana) was the eighteenth and final round of the 2021 Grand Prix motorcycle racing season. It was held at the Circuit Ricardo Tormo in Valencia on 14 November 2021. It was also the final Grand Prix for Valentino Rossi who retired after the season.

In the MotoGP class, Ducati Lenovo Team secured the Teams' Championship, its first since 2007 by making possible the first podium lock-up for Ducati in the MotoGP history with Francesco Bagnaia winning the race ahead of fellow Ducati riders Jorge Martín, who later became Rookie of the Year, and Jack Miller.

In the Moto2 class, Remy Gardner won the Riders' Championship. Remy and his father Wayne became the second father-son World Champions after Kenny Roberts and Kenny Roberts Jr.

In the Moto3 class, KTM secured its fifth Constructors' Championship and its first since 2016.

== Qualifying ==
=== MotoGP ===
Fastest session lap

Pos.	No.	Biker	Constructor	Qualifying times		Final grid	Row
Pos.	No.	Biker	Constructor	Q1	Q2	Final grid	Row
1	89	(Spain) Jorge Martín	Ducati	Qualified in Q2	1:29.936	1	1
2	63	(Italy) Francesco Bagnaia	Ducati	Qualified in Q2	1:30.000	2	1
3	43	(Australia) Jack Miller	Ducati	Qualified in Q2	1:30.325	3	1
4	36	(Spain) Joan Mir	Suzuki	Qualified in Q2	1:30.395	4	2
5	5	(France) Johann Zarco	Ducati	Qualified in Q2	1:30.418	5	2
6	42	(Spain) Álex Rins	Suzuki	1:30.673	1:30.475	6	2
7	33	(South Africa) Brad Binder	KTM	1:30.788	1:30.509	7	3
8	20	(France) Fabio Quartararo	Yamaha	Qualified in Q2	1:30.620	8	3
9	30	(Japan) Takaaki Nakagami	Honda	Qualified in Q2	1:30.644	9	3
10	46	(Italy) Valentino Rossi	Yamaha	Qualified in Q2	1:30.746	10	4
11	21	(Italy) Franco Morbidelli	Yamaha	Qualified in Q2	1:30.781	11	4
12	41	(Spain) Aleix Espargaró	Aprilia	Qualified in Q2	1:31.024	12	4
13	4	(Italy) Andrea Dovizioso	Yamaha	1:30.859	N/A	13	5
14	12	(Spain) Maverick Viñales	Aprilia	1:30.991	N/A	14	5
15	27	(Spain) Iker Lecuona	KTM	1:30.994	N/A	15	5
16	9	(Italy) Danilo Petrucci	KTM	1:31.045	N/A	16	6
17	10	(Italy) Luca Marini	Ducati	1:31.073	N/A	17	6
18	23	(Italy) Enea Bastianini	Ducati	1:31.185	N/A	18	6
19	73	(Spain) Álex Márquez	Honda	1:31.251	N/A	19	7
20	88	(Portugal) Miguel Oliveira	KTM	1:31.319	N/A	20	7
DNP	44	(Spain) Pol Espargaró	Honda	N/A	N/A	N/A	N/A
OFFICIAL MOTOGP QUALIFYING RESULTS

- Pol Espargaró was declared unfit to compete after a crash in free practice.

== Race ==
=== MotoGP ===
Pos.	No.	Rider	Team	Manufacturer	Laps	Time/Retired	Grid	Points
1	63	(Italy) Francesco Bagnaia	Ducati Lenovo Team	Ducati	27	41:15.481	2	25
2	89	(Spain) Jorge Martín	Pramac Racing	Ducati	27	+0.489	1	20
3	43	(Australia) Jack Miller	Ducati Lenovo Team	Ducati	27	+0.823	3	16
4	36	(Spain) Joan Mir	Team Suzuki Ecstar	Suzuki	27	+5.214	4	13
5	20	(France) Fabio Quartararo	Monster Energy Yamaha MotoGP	Yamaha	27	+5.439	8	11
6	5	(France) Johann Zarco	Pramac Racing	Ducati	27	+6.993	5	10
7	33	(South Africa) Brad Binder	Red Bull KTM Factory Racing	KTM	27	+8.437	7	9
8	23	(Italy) Enea Bastianini	Avintia Esponsorama	Ducati	27	+10.933	18	8
9	41	(Spain) Aleix Espargaró	Aprilia Racing Team Gresini	Aprilia	27	+12.651	12	7
10	46	(Italy) Valentino Rossi	Petronas Yamaha SRT	Yamaha	27	+13.468	10	6
11	21	(Italy) Franco Morbidelli	Monster Energy Yamaha MotoGP	Yamaha	27	+14.085	11	5
12	4	(Italy) Andrea Dovizioso	Petronas Yamaha SRT	Yamaha	27	+16.534	13	4
13	73	(Spain) Álex Márquez	LCR Honda Castrol	Honda	27	+17.059	19	3
14	88	(Portugal) Miguel Oliveira	Red Bull KTM Factory Racing	KTM	27	+18.221	20	2
15	27	(Spain) Iker Lecuona	Tech3 KTM Factory Racing	KTM	27	+19.233	15	1
16	12	(Spain) Maverick Viñales	Aprilia Racing Team Gresini	Aprilia	27	+19.815	14	
17	10	(Italy) Luca Marini	Sky VR46 Avintia	Ducati	27	+28.860	17	
18	9	(Italy) Danilo Petrucci	Tech3 KTM Factory Racing	KTM	27	+32.169	16	
Ret	42	(Spain) Álex Rins	Team Suzuki Ecstar	Suzuki	10	Accident	6	
Ret	30	(Japan) Takaaki Nakagami	LCR Honda Idemitsu	Honda	4	Accident	9	
DNS	44	(Spain) Pol Espargaró	Repsol Honda Team	Honda		Did not start		
Fastest lap: (Italy) Francesco Bagnaia (Ducati) – 1:31.042 (lap 16)
Sources:

- Pol Espargaró was declared unfit to compete after a crash in free practice.

=== Moto2 ===
The race, scheduled to be run for 25 laps, was red-flagged due to a first-lap accident involving multiple riders and the resulting oil spill. The race was later restarted over 16 laps with the original starting grid.

Pos.	No.	Rider	Manufacturer	Laps	Time/Retired	Grid	Points
1	25	(Spain) Raúl Fernández	Kalex	16	25:38.612	5	25
2	21	(Italy) Fabio Di Giannantonio	Kalex	16	+0.517	4	20
3	37	(Spain) Augusto Fernández	Kalex	16	+0.786	3	16
4	13	(Italy) Celestino Vietti	Kalex	16	+2.393	2	13
5	44	(Spain) Arón Canet	Boscoscuro	16	+4.978	7	11
6	97	(Spain) Xavi Vierge	Kalex	16	+5.091	12	10
7	22	(United Kingdom) Sam Lowes	Kalex	16	+5.415	10	9
8	9	(Spain) Jorge Navarro	Boscoscuro	16	+5.808	9	8
9	23	(Germany) Marcel Schrötter	Kalex	16	+7.941	13	7
10	87	(Australia) Remy Gardner	Kalex	16	+9.112	8	6
11	45	(Japan) Tetsuta Nagashima	Kalex	16	+9.420	15	5
12	12	(Switzerland) Thomas Lüthi	Kalex	16	+10.355	6	4
13	62	(Italy) Stefano Manzi	Kalex	16	+11.898	19	3
14	42	(Spain) Marcos Ramírez	Kalex	16	+12.088	16	2
15	55	(Malaysia) Hafizh Syahrin	NTS	16	+12.361	14	1
16	96	(United Kingdom) Jake Dixon	Kalex	16	+13.982	22	
17	54	(Spain) Fermín Aldeguer	Boscoscuro	16	+14.022	20	
18	70	(Belgium) Barry Baltus	NTS	16	+14.145	29	
19	35	(Thailand) Somkiat Chantra	Kalex	16	+17.111	24	
20	72	(Italy) Marco Bezzecchi	Kalex	16	+19.273	11	
21	6	(United States) Cameron Beaubier	Kalex	16	+19.426	17	
22	75	(Spain) Albert Arenas	Boscoscuro	16	+19.608	25	
23	14	(Italy) Tony Arbolino	Kalex	16	+19.986	26	
24	11	(Italy) Nicolò Bulega	Kalex	16	+23.805	23	
25	64	(Netherlands) Bo Bendsneyder	Kalex	16	+31.559	21	
Ret	40	(Spain) Héctor Garzó	Kalex	11	Accident	18	
Ret	20	(Indonesia) Dimas Ekky Pratama	Kalex	2	Accident	28	
DNS	24	(Italy) Simone Corsi	MV Agusta	0	Did not restart	1	
DNS	7	(Italy) Lorenzo Baldassarri	MV Agusta	0	Did not restart	27	
DNS	16	(United States) Joe Roberts	Kalex		Did not start		
OFFICIAL MOTO2 RACE REPORT

- Simone Corsi entered the pits at the end of the warm-up lap due to a mechanical problem.

=== Moto3 ===
Pos.	No.	Rider	Manufacturer	Laps	Time/Retired	Grid	Points
1	43	(Spain) Xavier Artigas	Honda	23	38:30.302	17	25
2	11	(Spain) Sergio García	Gas Gas	23	+0.043	10	20
3	5	(Spain) Jaume Masià	KTM	23	+0.232	23	16
4	12	(Czech Republic) Filip Salač	KTM	23	+0.443	5	13
5	53	(Turkey) Deniz Öncü	KTM	23	+0.540	13	11
6	82	(Italy) Stefano Nepa	KTM	23	+1.156	14	10
7	28	(Spain) Izan Guevara	Gas Gas	23	+1.209	3	9
8	99	(Spain) Carlos Tatay	KTM	23	+2.109	11	8
9	23	(Italy) Niccolò Antonelli	KTM	23	+2.185	9	7
10	71	(Japan) Ayumu Sasaki	KTM	23	+2.322	26	6
11	17	(United Kingdom) John McPhee	Honda	23	+2.791	15	5
12 (Note: 1-position penalty for exceeding track limits on the last lap.)	55	(Italy) Romano Fenati	Husqvarna	23	+2.461	8	4
13	7	(Italy) Dennis Foggia	Honda	23	+3.819 (Note: 3-second penalty for irresponsible riding.)	7	3
14	31	(Spain) Adrián Fernández	Husqvarna	23	+13.298	19	2
15	52	(Spain) Jeremy Alcoba	Honda	23	+13.348	12	1
16	54	(Italy) Riccardo Rossi	KTM	23	+13.369	27	
17	27	(Japan) Kaito Toba	KTM	23	+17.249	24	
18	16	(Italy) Andrea Migno	Honda	23	+45.581	4	
19	6	(Japan) Ryusei Yamanaka	KTM	18	+5 laps	22	
Ret	37	(Spain) Pedro Acosta	KTM	22	Accident	1	
Ret	67	(Italy) Alberto Surra	Honda	20	Accident	25	
Ret	24	(Japan) Tatsuki Suzuki	Honda	17	Accident	2	
Ret	92	(Japan) Yuki Kunii	Honda	12	Accident Damage	20	
Ret	66	(Australia) Joel Kelso	KTM	4	Accident	18	
Ret	95	(Spain) José Antonio Rueda	Honda	4	Accident	21	
Ret	20	(France) Lorenzo Fellon	Honda	0	Accident	6	
Ret	40	(South Africa) Darryn Binder	Honda	0	Accident	16	
DNS	19	(Indonesia) Andi Farid Izdihar	Honda		Did not start		
OFFICIAL MOTO3 RACE REPORT

- Andi Farid Izdihar was declared unfit to compete after a crash in free practice.

== Championship standings after the race ==
Below are the standings for the top five riders, constructors, and teams after the round.

=== MotoGP ===
Riders' Championship standings

Pos.	Rider	Points
1	(France) Fabio Quartararo	278
2	(Italy) Francesco Bagnaia	252
3	(Spain) Joan Mir	208
4	(Australia) Jack Miller	181
5	(France) Johann Zarco	173

Constructors' Championship standings

Pos.	Constructor	Points
1	(Italy) Ducati	357
2	(Japan) Yamaha	309
3	(Japan) Suzuki	240
4	(Japan) Honda	214
5	(Austria) KTM	205

Teams' Championship standings

Pos.	Team	Points
1	(Italy) Ducati Lenovo Team	433
2	(Japan) Monster Energy Yamaha MotoGP	380
3	(Japan) Team Suzuki Ecstar	307
4	(Italy) Pramac Racing	288
5	(Japan) Repsol Honda Team	250

=== Moto2 ===
Riders' Championship standings

Pos.	Rider	Points
1	(Australia) Remy Gardner	311
2	(Spain) Raúl Fernández	307
3	(Italy) Marco Bezzecchi	214
4	(United Kingdom) Sam Lowes	190
5	(Spain) Augusto Fernández	174

Constructors' Championship standings

Pos.	Constructor	Points
1	(Germany) Kalex	450
2	(Italy) Boscoscuro	199
3	(Italy) MV Agusta	19
4	(Japan) NTS	11

Teams' Championship standings

	Pos.	Team	Points
	1	(Finland) Red Bull KTM Ajo	618
	2	(Belgium) Elf Marc VDS Racing Team	364
	3	(Italy) Sky Racing Team VR46	303
	4	(Spain) Inde Aspar Team	192
1	5	(Italy) Federal Oil Gresini Moto2	173

=== Moto3 ===
Riders' Championship standings

	Pos.	Rider	Points
	1	(Spain) Pedro Acosta	259
	2	(Italy) Dennis Foggia	216
	3	(Spain) Sergio García	188
1	4	(Spain) Jaume Masiá	171
1	5	(Italy) Romano Fenati	160

Constructors' Championship standings

Pos.	Constructor	Points
1	(Austria) KTM	369
2	(Japan) Honda	360
3	(Spain) Gas Gas	266
4	(Sweden) Husqvarna	166

Teams' Championship standings

	Pos.	Team	Points
	1	(Finland) Red Bull KTM Ajo	430
	2	(Spain) Valresa GasGas Aspar Team	313
	3	(Luxembourg) Leopard Racing	288
1	4	(France) Red Bull KTM Tech3	218
1	5	(Malaysia) Petronas Sprinta Racing	216

== Notes ==
Previous race: 2021 Algarve Grand Prix	FIM Grand Prix World Championship; 2021 season	Next race: 2022 Qatar Grand Prix
Previous race: 2020 Valencian Grand Prix	Valencian Community motorcycle Grand Prix	Next race: 2022 Valencian Grand Prix
