= Ajo Motorsport =

Grand Prix motorcycle racing team

- 2025 name: Moto2: Red Bull KTM Ajo; Moto3: Red Bull KTM Ajo
- Base: Tampere, Finland
- Principal: Niklas Ajo
- Rider(s): Moto2: 95. Collin Veijer; 98. José Antonio Rueda; Moto3: 51. Brian Uriarte; 83. Álvaro Carpe
- Motorcycle: Moto2: Kalex Moto2; Moto3: KTM RC250GP
- Tyres: Moto2: Pirelli; Moto3: Pirelli
- Riders' Championships: Moto2: 2015: Johann Zarco; 2016: Johann Zarco; 2021: Remy Gardner; 2022: Augusto Fernández; 2023: Pedro Acosta; 125cc/Moto3: 125cc: 2008: Mike Di Meglio; 2010: Marc Márquez; Moto3: 2012: Sandro Cortese; 2016: Brad Binder; 2021: Pedro Acosta; 2025 José Antonio Rueda
- Teams' Championships: Moto2: 2018; 2021; 2022; 2023; Moto3: 2021; 2025

Ajo Motorsport is a Finnish Grand Prix motorcycle racing team, currently competing in the Moto2 and Moto3 classes under the name Red Bull KTM Ajo. The team's founder and principal is former racer Aki Ajo. His son, former 125cc/Moto3 rider Niklas Ajo, is the current team principal of the team as Aki Ajo becomes team manager of the factory KTM MotoGP team.

The team debuted in 2001 and took its first win in 2003. Ajo Motorsport has won ten world championship titles; the 125cc championship with Mike Di Meglio in 2008 and Marc Márquez in 2010, the Moto3 championship in 2012 with Sandro Cortese, 2016 with Brad Binder, and 2021 with Pedro Acosta and the Moto2 championship in 2015 and 2016, both with Johann Zarco, 2021 with Remy Gardner, 2022 with Augusto Fernández, and 2023 with Pedro Acosta.

== History ==
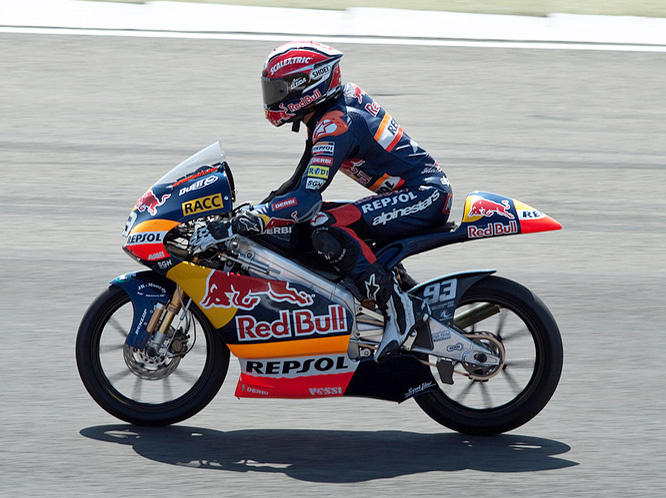
Marc Márquez at the 2010 Dutch TT

The team's debut at a world championship race was at Sachsenring in 2001, where the team entered Mika Kallio as a wildcard rider. The team and Kallio also took part in the competition in Valencia later in the year. The team's bikes were labelled with the Honda brand name, even though the engines were supplied by Ajo. The year 2002 was the first season in which Ajo was a regular competitor in the World Championship, with Kallio as their main rider. Their best result that season was fifth place in Jerez, and Kallio was named "Rookie of the Year", beating riders such as Andrea Dovizioso and Jorge Lorenzo.

In 2003, the team expanded to two bikes, with Kallio being joined by the Japanese competitor Masao Azuma. Kallio then left the team in August after receiving an offer from KTM. He was replaced by Andrea Ballerini. In Australia, the team achieved a 1–2 victory, with Ballerini in first place and Azuma in second. Ajo attributed a large portion of their success to the combination of wet conditions and Bridgestone tyres, which are optimal for damp weather. For the 2004 season, the team had two new riders in Lukáš Pešek and Danish Robbin Harms. The season was a disappointing one for Ajo, as Pešek crashed repeatedly and as Harms suffered several injuries. Pešek moved to the Derbi team for the next season.

Japanese Tomoyoshi Koyama and French Alexis Masbou were Ajo's riders in the 2005 season. Koyama won the "Rookie of the Year" title, the team's second in four years. His best results were second place in Australia and third in Turkey; in overall standings he held eighth place. The team kept the same riders for the following year but obtained new bikes from Malaguti. Both riders suffered many injuries which affected their season. Masbou was only able to ride eight races and did not score any points. Koyama's best result was sixth in Estoril, and he ended in 15th place in the championship standings. In 2007, the team raced with Derbi bikes, driven by Michael Ranseder and Robert Mureșan. Ranseder finished in the points 13 times, while Mureșan failed to score.

Ajo Motorsport continued with Derbi for the 2008 season, with Mike Di Meglio and Dominique Aegerter as their riders. Di Meglio won four races (France, Catalonia, Germany and Australia) and clinched the world championship in Australia, two races before the end of the season. Aegerter finished eighth twice. Sandro Cortese accompanied Dominique Aegerter in 2009. The team scored several podiums this season but did not manage to win any races. In the 2010 season, Ajo Motorsport fielded Marc Márquez, Sandro Cortese and Adrián Martín. The season was a big success for the team. Márquez scored twelve poles and ten victories, and brought the team its second title in three years.

Five riders across two teams were run by Ajo for the 2011 season with the Avant-AirAsia-Ajo team remaining with the Derbi and the Red Bull Ajo Motorsport on Aprilias. Despite missing out on winning the championship, future Moto2 champion Johann Zarco finished second with a run of podiums and a win in Japan on the Derbi. On the Aprilia was future Moto3 champion Danny Kent, and Jonas Folger who also bought the team a podium and a win at the British GP.

The year 2012 was the championship move from 125cc to Moto3 and the team went with the KTM. The season was a full return to form with Sandro Cortese winning the championship with the Red Bull KTM Ajo team taking five wins and nine podiums. Danny Kent also took fourth with consistent point scoring and two wins.

The 2013 season saw Ajo cut back to a single team fielding three riders, and with two wildcards in Malaysia. Luis Salom joined the team to replace the departing Cortese and Kent. Salom managed seven wins and five podiums but this only got him a third overall.

Ajo expanded greatly for 2014 fielding four teams with five full time riders and two wildcards. Jack Miller joined and took second overall missing out on first by only two points. Ajo also took on Husqvarna as a make with the team's founder Aki's son, Niklas, Danny Kent making a return riding them.

The year 2015 saw the Moto3 teams take a cut but expansion into the Moto2 class. The team's entry into Moto2 was spectacular with Johann Zarco rejoining the team and winning the championship taking eight victories, six podiums, and finishing every other race in the points. The Moto3 effort saw another strong season with Brad Binder and Miguel Oliveira joining the team and taking sixth and second respectively in the championship. Bo Bendsneyder also joined for Moto3 to replace the departing Oliveira.

The year 2016 was another excellent season with Zarco winning his second Moto2 championship, and Binder winning the Moto3 championship.

A season of contrasts came in 2017 with Binder and Oliveira joining the Moto2 effort taking 8th and 3rd respectively. They saw three wins and seven podiums between them. The Moto3 team retained Bendsneyder and had Niccolo Antonelli join, and Kent return for two wildcards, however, the season was a disappointment with Bendsneyder being the highest finisher in only 15th.

The year 2018 mirrored the previous season. Binder and Oliveira continued to perform well in Moto2 ultimately taking third and second in the championship with another six wins and eight podiums to their combined tally. Darryn Binder was the only full time Moto3 rider taking 17th with 57 points. Wildcards Raúl Fernández and Can Öncü saw respectable results with a ninth and a win resulting in placements of 28th and 24th overall.

Another near miss came in 2019 with Binder taking second overall by three points. Jorge Martín replaced Oliveira. Can Öncü became a full time rider but could not replicate his previous success managing only eight points across the season. Can's twin brother Deniz Öncü also rode at six events. Ajo also expanded into the MotoE championship and started strong with rider Niki Tuuli winning the opening round but not being able to replicate the success and the Jerez fire putting a stop to the MotoE season.

The shortened 2020 season saw a low for Ajo with no riders managing to finish in the top 3 overall in any class. Ajo switched to Kalex chassis as KTM shut down its Moto2 chassis programme. Tetsuta Nagashima started Moto2 well with a win and scored points across the season to take eighth, and Martín taking two wins and four podiums for fifth. Moto3 saw Raúl Fernández take two wins and two thirds to manage a fourth overall. In the MotoE championship, Niki Tuuli finished the season with a third and a win for sixth overall.

A resounding return to success came in 2021. Fernández was promoted to Moto2 and joined by seasoned Moto2 rider Remy Gardner. Gardner took the championship by four points from rookie Fernández after a season long battle with both taking multiple wins and podiums. The Moto3 team consisted of Jaume Masià and rookie Pedro Acosta. Masià had a reasonable season with two wins and four podiums but Acosta took the championship by storm with six wins and two podiums to make him the second youngest championship winner ever. The team remained in the MotoE class with Hikari Okubo taking 11th overall.

The year 2022 was another strong season for Ajo. Pedro Acosta was promoted to Moto2 and had a strong first season with three wins and two seconds taking him to fifth overall. He was joined by Augusto Fernández whose four wins and five podiums gave him the championship. Masià remained with the team and despite two wins and regular podiums and points only managed sixth. He was joined by Daniel Holgado. Hikari Okubo remained with the team in MotoE and his season long point scoring resulted in a sixth overall.

Augusto Fernandez moved to MotoGP class in 2023, replaced by Albert Arenas as a teammate of Acosta in the Moto2 team. Acosta won the rider's championship with seven wins, while Arenas had a difficult season with only one podium finish, and he left the team at the end of the season. Ajo's Moto3 team had a completely new lineup, with Deniz Öncü and 2022 JuniorGP champion José Antonio Rueda replaced both Holgado and Masia. Öncü and Rueda finished fourth and ninth respectively in the riders standings.

The 2024 season saw a change in Ajo's Moto2 programme, with Moto3 graduate Öncü and Celestino Vietti as its riders. While the team continued with Kalex chassis, their relationship with KTM saw the team (along with Pierer-backed Aspar Team and Intact GP) switched suspension supplier to WP, while other Kalex teams remained with Öhlins.

== Grand Prix motorcycle results ==
=== By rider ===
Year	Class	Team name	Bike	No.	Riders	Races	Wins	Podiums	Poles	F. laps	Points	Pos.
2001	125cc	Red Devil Honda	Honda RS125R	36	(Finland) Mika Kallio	2	0	0	0	0	0	NC
2002	125cc	Red Devil Honda	Honda RS125R	36	(Finland) Mika Kallio	16	0	0	0	0	78	11th
2002	125cc	Red Devil Honda	Honda RS125R	88	(Denmark) Robbin Harms	1	0	0	0	0	0	NC
2003	125cc	Ajo Motorsport	Honda RS125R	8	(Japan) Masao Azuma	16	0	1	0	0	64	16th
2003	125cc	Ajo Motorsport	Honda RS125R	36	(Finland) Mika Kallio	9 (15)	0	0 (1)	0	0	46 (88)	11th
2003	125cc	Ajo Motorsport	Honda RS125R	39	(Japan) Hiroyuki Kikuchi	0	0	0	0	0	0	NC
2003	125cc	Ajo Motorsport	Honda RS125R	50	(Italy) Andrea Ballerini	7	1	1	0	1	25	22nd
2004	125cc	Ajo Motorsport	Honda RS125R	31	(Italy) Max Sabbatani	4	0	0	0	0	0	NC
2004	125cc	Ajo Motorsport	Honda RS125R	38	(Finland) Mikko Kyyhkynen	3	0	0	0	0	0	NC
2004	125cc	Ajo Motorsport	Honda RS125R	52	(Czech Republic) Lukáš Pešek	16	0	0	0	0	20	21st
2004	125cc	Ajo Motorsport	Honda RS125R	69	(Denmark) Robbin Harms	8	0	0	0	0	5	30th
2005	125cc	Ajo Motorsport	Honda RS125R	7	(France) Alexis Masbou	15	0	0	0	0	28	18th
2005	125cc	Ajo Motorsport	Honda RS125R	38	(China) Cheung Wai On	1 (2)	0	0	0	0	0	NC
2005	125cc	Ajo Motorsport	Honda RS125R	71	(Japan) Tomoyoshi Koyama	16	0	2	0	0	119	8th
2006	125cc	Malaguti Ajo Corse	Malaguti 125	7	(France) Alexis Masbou	8	0	0	0	0	0	NC
2006	125cc	Malaguti Ajo Corse	Malaguti 125	40	(Italy) Nico Vivarelli	1 (2)	0	0	0	0	0	NC
2006	125cc	Malaguti Ajo Corse	Malaguti 125	71	(Japan) Tomoyoshi Koyama	13	0	0	0	0	49	15th
2006	125cc	Malaguti Ajo Corse	Malaguti 125	73	(Japan) Kazuya Otani	2	0	0	0	0	0	NC
2006	125cc	Malaguti Ajo Corse	Malaguti 125	90	(Japan) Hiroaki Kuzuhara	2 (7)	0	0	0	0	0 (1)	29th
2006	125cc	Malaguti Ajo Corse	Malaguti 125	95	(Germany) Georg Fröhlich	1 (4)	0	0	0	0	0	NC
2007	125cc	Ajo Motorsport	Derbi RS125R	60	(Austria) Michael Ranseder	17	0	0	0	0	73	12th
2007	125cc	Ajo Motorsport	Derbi RS125R	95	(Romania) Robert Mureșan	16	0	0	0	0	0	NC
2008	125cc	Ajo Motorsport	Derbi RSA125	63	(France) Mike Di Meglio	17	4	9	2	4	264	**1st**
2008	125cc	Ajo Motorsport	Aprilia RS125R	77	(Switzerland) Dominique Aegerter	17	0	0	0	0	45	16th
2008	125cc	Ajo Motorsports Junior Project	Aprilia RS125R	84	(Sweden) Robert Gull	1	0	0	0	0	0	NC
2009	125cc	Ajo Interwetten	Derbi RSA125	11	(Germany) Sandro Cortese	16	0	3	1	2	130	6th
2009	125cc	Ajo Interwetten	Derbi RSA125	77	(Switzerland) Dominique Aegerter	16	0	0	0	0	70.5	13th
2009	125cc	Ajo Motorsport	Honda RS125R	81	(Finland) Eeki Kuparinen	1	0	0	0	0	0	NC
2010	125cc	Avant Mitsubishi Ajo	Derbi RSA125	11	(Germany) Sandro Cortese	17	0	2	1	2	143	7th
2010	125cc	Aeroport de Castello - Ajo	Aprilia RSA125	26	(Spain) Adrián Martín	16	0	0	0	0	35	15th
2010	125cc	Red Bull Ajo Motorsport	Derbi RSA125	93	(Spain) Marc Márquez	17	10	12	12	8	310	**1st**
2011	125cc	Avant-AirAsia-Ajo	Derbi RSA125	5	(France) Johann Zarco	17	1	11	4	5	262	**2nd**
2011	125cc	Avant-AirAsia-Ajo	Derbi RSA125	7	(Spain) Efrén Vázquez	17	0	2	0	0	160	7th
2011	125cc	Airasia–SIC–Ajo	Derbi RSW125	63	(Malaysia) Zulfahmi Khairuddin	17	0	0	0	0	30	18th
2011	125cc	Red Bull Ajo Motorsport	Aprilia RSW125	52	(United Kingdom) Danny Kent	13	0	0	0	0	82	11th
2011	125cc	Red Bull Ajo Motorsport	Aprilia RSA125	52	(United Kingdom) Danny Kent	4	0	0	0	0	82	11th
2011	125cc	Red Bull Ajo Motorsport	Aprilia RSA125	94	(Germany) Jonas Folger	16	1	3	0	0	161	6th
2012	Moto3	Red Bull KTM Ajo	KTM RC250GP	11	(Germany) Sandro Cortese	17	5	15	7	4	325	**1st**
2012	Moto3	Red Bull KTM Ajo	KTM RC250GP	52	(United Kingdom) Danny Kent	17	2	3	1	1	154	4th
2012	Moto3	Red Bull KTM Ajo	KTM RC250GP	61	(Australia) Arthur Sissis	17	0	1	0	0	84	12th
2012	Moto3	AirAsia-SIC-Ajo	KTM RC250GP	63	(Malaysia) Zulfahmi Khairuddin	17	0	2	1	3	128	7th
2013	Moto3	Red Bull KTM Ajo	KTM RC250GP	39	(Spain) Luis Salom	17	7	12	4	5	302	**3rd**
2013	Moto3	Red Bull KTM Ajo	KTM RC250GP	61	(Australia) Arthur Sissis	17	0	0	0	0	59	15th
2013	Moto3	Red Bull KTM Ajo	KTM RC250GP	63	(Malaysia) Zulfahmi Khairuddin	16	0	0	0	0	68	12th
2013	Moto3	Touchline–SIC–Ajo	KTM RC250GP	79	(Malaysia) Aizat Malik	1	0	0	0	0	0	NC
2013	Moto3	Touchline–SIC–Ajo	KTM RC250GP	80	(Malaysia) Hafiq Azmi	1 (4)	0	0	0	0	0	NC
2014	Moto3	Red Bull KTM Ajo	KTM RC250GP	8	(Australia) Jack Miller	18	6	10	8	1	276	**2nd**
2014	Moto3	Red Bull KTM Ajo	KTM RC250GP	98	(Czech Republic) Karel Hanika	18	0	0	0	0	44	18th
2014	Moto3	SIC-Ajo	KTM RC250GP	38	(Malaysia) Hafiq Azmi	18	0	0	0	0	3	28th
2014	Moto3	SIC-Ajo	KTM RC250R	88	(Malaysia) Hafiza Rofa	1	0	0	0	0	0	NC
2014	Moto3	Avant Tecno Husqvarna Ajo	Husqvarna FR250GP	31	(Finland) Niklas Ajo	17	0	0	0	0	52	15th
2014	Moto3	Avant Tecno Husqvarna Ajo	Husqvarna FR250GP	91	(Argentina) Gabriel Rodrigo	1 (7)	0	0	0	0	0	NC
2014	Moto3	Red Bull Husqvarna Ajo	Husqvarna FR250GP	52	(United Kingdom) Danny Kent	18	0	2	1	0	129	8th
2015	Moto2	Ajo Motorsport	Kalex Moto2	5	(France) Johann Zarco	18	8	14	7	1	352	**1st**
2015	Moto3	Red Bull KTM Ajo	KTM RC250GP	41	(South Africa) Brad Binder	18	0	4	0	3	159	6th
2015	Moto3	Red Bull KTM Ajo	KTM RC250GP	44	(Portugal) Miguel Oliveira	17	6	9	1	3	254	**2nd**
2015	Moto3	Red Bull KTM Ajo	KTM RC250GP	98	(Czech Republic) Karel Hanika	18	0	0	0	0	43	18th
2016	Moto2	Ajo Motorsport	Kalex Moto2	5	(France) Johann Zarco	18	7	10	7	4	276	**1st**
2016	Moto2	Ajo Motorsport Academy	Kalex Moto2	45	(Japan) Tetsuta Nagashima	2	0	0	0	0	2	32nd
2016	Moto3	Red Bull KTM Ajo	KTM RC250GP	41	(South Africa) Brad Binder	18	7	14	6	3	319	**1st**
2016	Moto3	Red Bull KTM Ajo	KTM RC250GP	64	(Netherlands) Bo Bendsneyder	18	0	2	0	0	78	14th
2017	Moto2	Red Bull KTM Ajo	KTM RC12	41	(South Africa) Brad Binder	15	0	3	0	2	125	8th
2017	Moto2	Red Bull KTM Ajo	KTM RC12	44	(Portugal) Miguel Oliveira	18	3	9	2	3	241	**3rd**
2017	Moto2	Red Bull KTM Ajo	KTM RC12	88	(Spain) Ricard Cardus	3 (5)	0	0	0	0	7 (7)	29th
2017	Moto3	Red Bull KTM Ajo	KTM RC250GP	23	(Italy) Niccolò Antonelli	16	0	1	0	0	38	18th
2017	Moto3	Red Bull KTM Ajo	KTM RC250GP	64	(Netherlands) Bo Bendsneyder	17	0	0	0	0	65	15th
2017	Moto3	Red Bull KTM Ajo	KTM RC250GP	52	(United Kingdom) Danny Kent	2	0	0	0	0	6	32nd
2018	Moto2	Red Bull KTM Ajo	KTM RC12	41	(South Africa) Brad Binder	18	3	3	1	1	201	**3rd**
2018	Moto2	Red Bull KTM Ajo	KTM RC12	44	(Portugal) Miguel Oliveira	18	3	12	0	1	297	**2nd**
2018	Moto3	Red Bull KTM Ajo	KTM RC250GP	40	(South Africa) Darryn Binder	16	0	1	0	1	57	17th
2018	Moto3	Red Bull KTM Ajo	KTM RC250GP	25	(Spain) Raúl Fernández	1 (4)	0	0	0	0	7 (16)	28th
2018	Moto3	Red Bull KTM Ajo	KTM RC250GP	61	(Turkey) Can Öncü	1	1	1	0	0	25	24th
2019	Moto2	Red Bull KTM Ajo	KTM RC12	41	(South Africa) Brad Binder	19	5	9	0	0	259	**2nd**
2019	Moto2	Red Bull KTM Ajo	KTM RC12	88	(Spain) Jorge Martín	19	0	2	0	1	94	11th
2019	Moto3	Red Bull KTM Ajo	KTM RC250GP	61	(Turkey) Can Öncü	16	0	0	0	1	8	31st
2019	Moto3	Red Bull KTM Ajo	KTM RC250GP	53	(Turkey) Deniz Öncü	5	0	0	0	0	0	35th
2019	MotoE	Ajo MotoE	Energica Ego Corsa	66	(Finland) Niki Tuuli	3	1	1	1	1	26	15th
2019	MotoE	Ajo MotoE	Energica Ego Corsa	44	(France) Lucas Mahias	0	0	0	0	0	0	NC
2020	Moto2	Red Bull KTM Ajo	Kalex Moto2	45	(Japan) Tetsuta Nagashima	15	1	2	0	2	91	8th
2020	Moto2	Red Bull KTM Ajo	Kalex Moto2	88	(Spain) Jorge Martín	13	2	6	1	2	160	5th
2020	Moto2	Red Bull KTM Ajo	Kalex Moto2	54	(Italy) Mattia Pasini	1	0	0	0	0	0	29th
2020	Moto3	Red Bull KTM Ajo	KTM RC250GP	25	(Spain) Raúl Fernández	15	2	4	6	1	159	4th
2020	Moto3	Red Bull KTM Ajo	KTM RC250GP	27	(Japan) Kaito Toba	15	0	1	0	0	41	18th
2020	MotoE	Avant Ajo MotoE	Energica Ego Corsa	66	(Finland) Niki Tuuli	6	1	2	0	2	53	6th
2021	Moto2	Red Bull KTM Ajo	Kalex Moto2	25	(Spain) Raúl Fernández	18	8	12	7	7	307	**2nd**
2021	Moto2	Red Bull KTM Ajo	Kalex Moto2	87	(Australia) Remy Gardner	18	5	12	3	3	311	**1st**
2021	Moto3	Red Bull KTM Ajo	KTM RC250GP	5	(Spain) Jaume Masià	18	1	4	2	2	171	4th
2021	Moto3	Red Bull KTM Ajo	KTM RC250GP	37	(Spain) Pedro Acosta	18	6	8	1	1	259	**1st**
2021	MotoE	Avant Ajo MotoE	Energica Ego Corsa	78	(Japan) Hikari Okubo	7	0	0	0	0	45	11th
2022	Moto2	Red Bull KTM Ajo	Kalex Moto2	37	(Spain) Augusto Fernández	20	4	9	2	5	271.5	**1st**
2022	Moto2	Red Bull KTM Ajo	Kalex Moto2	51	(Spain) Pedro Acosta	18	3	5	1	1	177	5th
2022	Moto3	Red Bull KTM Ajo	KTM RC250GP	5	(Spain) Jaume Masià	20	2	6	0	6	177	6th
2022	Moto3	Red Bull KTM Ajo	KTM RC250GP	96	(Spain) Daniel Holgado	20	0	1	0	0	103	10th
2022	MotoE	Avant Ajo MotoE	Energica Ego Corsa	78	(Japan) Hikari Okubo	12	0	1	0	0	94.5	6th
2023	Moto2	Red Bull KTM Ajo	Kalex Moto2	37	(Spain) Pedro Acosta	20	7	14	3	8	332.5	**1st**
2023	Moto2	Red Bull KTM Ajo	Kalex Moto2	75	(Spain) Albert Arenas	18	0	1	0	0	85	14th
2023	Moto3	Red Bull KTM Ajo	KTM RC250GP	53	(Turkey) Deniz Öncü	20	3	7	4	3	223	4th
2023	Moto3	Red Bull KTM Ajo	KTM RC250GP	99	(Spain) José Antonio Rueda	20	0	1	0	0	121	9th
2024	Moto2	Red Bull KTM Ajo	Kalex Moto2	13	(Italy) Celestino Vietti	17	3	4	2	3	165	7th
2024	Moto2	Red Bull KTM Ajo	Kalex Moto2	53	(Turkey) Deniz Öncü	17	0	1	0	0	49	20th
2024	Moto2	Red Bull KTM Ajo	Kalex Moto2	32	(Germany) Marcel Schrötter	3	0	0	0	0	0	32nd
2024	Moto3	Red Bull KTM Ajo	KTM RC250GP	85	(Spain) Xabi Zurutuza	18	0	0	0	0	13	23rd
2024	Moto3	Red Bull KTM Ajo	KTM RC250GP	99	(Spain) José Antonio Rueda	18	1	4	1	2	157	7th
2024	Moto3	Red Bull KTM Ajo	KTM RC250GP	21	(Spain) Vicente Pérez	3 (6)	0	0	0	0	3 (3)	24th
2024	Moto3	Red Bull KTM Ajo	KTM RC250GP	83	(Spain) Álvaro Carpe	1	0	0	0	0	0	30th
2025	Moto2	Red Bull KTM Ajo	Kalex Moto2	17	(Spain) Daniel Muñoz	11 (13)	0	1	0	1	37 (37)	20th
2025	Moto2	Red Bull KTM Ajo	Kalex Moto2	53	(Turkey) Deniz Öncü	12	2	3	0	0	100	12th
2025	Moto2	Red Bull KTM Ajo	Kalex Moto2	95	(Netherlands) Collin Veijer	20	0	1	0	1	97	15th
2025	Moto3	Red Bull KTM Ajo	KTM RC250GP	51	(Spain) Brian Uriarte	2 (4)	0	0	0	0	3 (11)	28th
2025	Moto3	Red Bull KTM Ajo	KTM RC250GP	83	(Spain) Álvaro Carpe	22	0	4	1	3	215	4th
2025	Moto3	Red Bull KTM Ajo	KTM RC250GP	99	(Spain) José Antonio Rueda	19	10	14	5	4	365	**1st**
2026	Moto2	Red Bull KTM Ajo	Kalex Moto2	95	(Netherlands) Collin Veijer	17	0	2	1	0	89.5*	11th*
2026	Moto2	Red Bull KTM Ajo	Kalex Moto2	98	(Spain) José Antonio Rueda	19	0	0	0	0	56*	16th*
2026	Moto2	Red Bull KTM Ajo	Kalex Moto2	40	(Poland) Milan Pawelec	1	0	0	0	0	0*	35th*
2026	Moto3	Red Bull KTM Ajo	KTM RC250GP	51	(Spain) Brian Uriarte	18	2	6	3	1	207*	4th*
2026	Moto3	Red Bull KTM Ajo	KTM RC250GP	83	(Spain) Álvaro Carpe	19	0	8	1	2	216*	**3rd***

* Season still in progress.

=== By season ===
(key) (Races in bold indicate pole position; races in italics indicate fastest lap)

Season	Class	Team	Motorcycle	Tyre	No.	Rider	1	2	3	4	5	6	7	8	9	10	11	12	13	14	15	16	17	18	19	20	21	22	RC	Points	TC	Points	MC	Points
2001	125cc	Team Red Devil Honda	Honda RS125R				JPN	RSA	SPA	FRA	ITA	CAT	NED	GBR	GER	CZE	POR	VAL	PAC	AUS	MAL	RIO												
2001	125cc	Team Red Devil Honda	Honda RS125R		36	(Finland) Mika Kallio									Ret			Ret											NC	0	—N/a		1st	301
2002	125cc	Red Devil Honda	Honda RS125R	D			JPN	RSA	SPA	FRA	ITA	CAT	NED	GBR	GER	CZE	POR	RIO	PAC	MAL	AUS	VAL												
2002	125cc	Red Devil Honda	Honda RS125R	D	36	(Finland) Mika Kallio	Ret	12	5	8	Ret	9	Ret	Ret	9	10	8	8	6	7	Ret	16							11th	78	—N/a		2nd	285
2002	125cc	Red Devil Honda	Honda RS125R	D	88	(Denmark) Robbin Harms										23													NC	0	—N/a		2nd	285
2003	125cc	Ajo Motorsport	Honda RS125R				JPN	RSA	SPA	FRA	ITA	CAT	NED	GBR	GER	CZE	POR	RIO	PAC	MAL	AUS	VAL												
2003	125cc	Ajo Motorsport	Honda RS125R		8	(Japan) Masao Azuma	17	9	11	10	14	22	Ret	13	Ret	13	13	Ret	13	5	2	15							16th	64	—N/a		2nd	286
2003	125cc	Ajo Motorsport	Honda RS125R		36	(Finland) Mika Kallio	11	7	16	Ret	13	7	11	7	10														11th	88	—N/a		2nd	286
2003	125cc	Ajo Motorsport	Honda RS125R		39	(Japan) Hiroyuki Kikuchi										DNS													NC	0	—N/a		2nd	286
2003	125cc	Ajo Motorsport	Honda RS125R		50	(Italy) Andrea Ballerini										Ret	Ret	Ret	20	19	1	Ret							22nd	25	—N/a		2nd	286
2004	125cc	Ajo Motorsport	Honda RS125R	D			RSA	SPA	FRA	ITA	CAT	NED	RIO	GER	GBR	CZE	POR	JPN	QAT	MAL	AUS	VAL												
2004	125cc	Ajo Motorsport	Honda RS125R	D	31	(Italy) Max Sabbatani													Ret	Ret	25	Ret							NC	0	—N/a		2nd	301
2004	125cc	Ajo Motorsport	Honda RS125R	D	38	(Finland) Mikko Kyyhkynen					25	25	Ret																NC	0	—N/a		2nd	301
2004	125cc	Ajo Motorsport	Honda RS125R	D	52	(Czech Republic) Lukáš Pešek	20	Ret	14	15	Ret	Ret	15	17	12	Ret	8	Ret	17	Ret	12	Ret							21st	20	—N/a		2nd	301
2004	125cc	Ajo Motorsport	Honda RS125R	D	69	(Denmark) Robbin Harms	18	Ret	Ret	Ret				19	17	11	Ret												30th	5	—N/a		2nd	301
2005	125cc	Ajo Motorsport	Honda RS125R				SPA	POR	CHN	FRA	ITA	CAT	NED	GBR	GER	CZE	JPN	MAL	QAT	AUS	TUR	VAL												
2005	125cc	Ajo Motorsport	Honda RS125R		7	(France) Alexis Masbou	Ret	13	21	Ret	10	Ret	5	Ret	DSQ	Ret	20	14	20	10	Ret	Ret							18th	28	—N/a		2nd	304
2005	125cc	Ajo Motorsport	Honda RS125R		38	(China) Cheung Wai On			24																				NC	0	—N/a		2nd	304
2005	125cc	Ajo Motorsport	Honda RS125R		71	(Japan) Tomoyoshi Koyama	Ret	6	5	Ret	5	5	7	Ret	Ret	Ret	4	10	14	2	3	6							8th	119	—N/a		2nd	304
2006	125cc	Malaguti Ajo Corse	Malaguti 125				SPA	QAT	TUR	CHN	FRA	ITA	CAT	NED	GBR	GER	CZE	MAL	AUS	JPN	POR	VAL												
2006	125cc	Malaguti Ajo Corse	Malaguti 125		7	(France) Alexis Masbou	DNS	DNS	20	Ret	29	Ret	Ret	Ret		25	23	DNS											NC	0	—N/a		6th	49
2006	125cc	Malaguti Ajo Corse	Malaguti 125		40	(Italy) Nico Vivarelli																35							NC	0	—N/a		6th	49
2006	125cc	Malaguti Ajo Corse	Malaguti 125		71	(Japan) Tomoyoshi Koyama	12	15	9	9	13	15	DNS			15	16	Ret	12	7	6	14							15th	49	—N/a		6th	49
2006	125cc	Malaguti Ajo Corse	Malaguti 125		73	(Japan) Kazuya Otani														Ret	28								NC	0	—N/a		6th	49
2006	125cc	Malaguti Ajo Corse	Malaguti 125		90	(Japan) Hiroaki Kuzuhara								28	26														29th	1	—N/a		6th	49
2006	125cc	Malaguti Ajo Corse	Malaguti 125		95	(Germany) Georg Fröhlich									32														NC	0	—N/a		6th	49
2007	125cc	Ajo Motorsport	Derbi RS125R	D			QAT	SPA	TUR	CHN	FRA	ITA	CAT	GBR	NED	GER	CZE	RSM	POR	JPN	AUS	MAL	VAL											
2007	125cc	Ajo Motorsport	Derbi RS125R	D	60	(Austria) Michael Ranseder	13	9	12	7	14	11	10	20	9	10	8	10	Ret	9	22	Ret	13						12th	73	—N/a		2nd	199
2007	125cc	Ajo Motorsport	Derbi RS125R	D	95	(Romania) Robert Mureșan	Ret	18	22	26	23	19	24	16	Ret	17	Ret	29	23	Ret	DNQ	23	22						NC	0	—N/a		2nd	199
2008	125cc	Ajo Motorsport	Derbi RSA125	D			QAT	SPA	POR	CHN	FRA	ITA	CAT	GBR	NED	GER	CZE	RSM	IND	JPN	AUS	MAL	VAL											
2008	125cc	Ajo Motorsport	Derbi RSA125	D	63	(France) Mike Di Meglio	4	9	7	2	1	4	1	2	7	1	2	Ret	10	**2**	**1**	5	3						1st	264	—N/a		2nd	319
2008	125cc	Ajo Motorsport	Aprilia RS125R	D	77	(Switzerland) Dominique Aegerter	17	8	12	17	23	24	12	19	16	10	14	8	11	19	Ret	8	Ret						16th	45	—N/a		1st	401
2008	125cc	Ajo Motorsports; Junior Project	Aprilia RS125R	D	84	(Sweden) Robert Gull									27														NC	0	—N/a		1st	401
2009	125cc	Ajo Interwetten	Derbi RSA125	D			QAT	JPN	SPA	FRA	ITA	CAT	NED	GER	GBR	CZE	IND	RSM	POR	AUS	MAL	VAL												
2009	125cc	Ajo Interwetten	Derbi RSA125	D	11	(Germany) Sandro Cortese	3	6	6	12	10	9	**Ret**	6	Ret	6	18	5	2	3	6	8							6th	130	—N/a		2nd	216
2009	125cc	Ajo Interwetten	Derbi RSA125	D	77	(Switzerland) Dominique Aegerter	11	9	9	6	19	20	13	9	8	18	10	15	8	12	14	11							13th	70.5	—N/a		2nd	216
2009	125cc	Ajo Motorsport	Honda RS125R	D	81	(Finland) Eeki Kuparinen								Ret															NC	0	—N/a		4th	25
Season	Class	Team	Motorcycle	Tyre	No.	Rider	1	2	3	4	5	6	7	8	9	10	11	12	13	14	15	16	17	18	19	20	21	22	RC	Points	TC	Points	MC	Points
2010	125cc	Aeroport de Castello - Ajo	Aprilia RSA125	D			QAT	SPA	FRA	ITA	GBR	NED	CAT	GER	CZE	IND	RSM	ARA	JPN	MAL	AUS	POR	VAL											
2010	125cc	Aeroport de Castello - Ajo	Aprilia RSA125	D	26	(Spain) Adrián Martín	20	13	15	WD	16	16	11	Ret	11	Ret	15	11	9	13	11	Ret	Ret						15th	35	—N/a		2nd	348
2010	125cc	Avant Mitsubishi Ajo	Derbi RSA125	D	11	(Germany) Sandro Cortese	5	11	6	**Ret**	6	5	4	3	16	2	5	5	12	6	Ret	Ret	5						7th	143	—N/a		1st	405
2010	125cc	Red Bull Ajo Motorsport	Derbi RSA125	D	93	(Spain) Marc Márquez	**3**	**Ret**	3	1	**1**	**1**	**1**	**1**	7	**10**	1	**Ret**	**1**	**1**	**1**	1	**4**						1st	310	—N/a		1st	405
2011	125cc	Avant-AirAsia-Ajo	Derbi RSA125	D			QAT	SPA	POR	FRA	CAT	GBR	NED	ITA	GER	CZE	IND	RSM	ARA	JPN	AUS	MAL	VAL											
2011	125cc	Avant-AirAsia-Ajo	Derbi RSA125	D	5	(France) Johann Zarco	6	3	3	5	6	2	5	**2**	2	2	5	**2**	2	**1**	**3**	3	Ret						2nd	262	—N/a		2nd	284
2011	125cc	Avant-AirAsia-Ajo	Derbi RSA125	D	7	(Spain) Efrén Vázquez	4	9	6	3	5	5	7	4	Ret	Ret	6	3	4	Ret	4	11	4						7th	160	—N/a		2nd	284
2011	125cc	Airasia–SIC–Ajo	Derbi RSW125	D	63	(Malaysia) Zulfahmi Khairuddin	19	10	11	19	Ret	18	14	18	24	9	19	27	Ret	15	20	7	25						18th	30	—N/a		2nd	284
2011	125cc	Red Bull; Ajo Motorsport	Aprilia RSA125; Aprilia RSW125	D	52	(United Kingdom) Danny Kent	13	4	15	17	11	10	6	15	9	Ret	13	6	6	9	22	10	17						11th	82	—N/a		1st	420
2011	125cc	Red Bull; Ajo Motorsport	Aprilia RSA125	D	94	(Germany) Jonas Folger	5	2	5	6	3	1	8	Ret	7	DNS	9	9	10	6	Ret	6	5						6th	161	—N/a		1st	420
2012	Moto3	Red Bull KTM Ajo	KTM RC250GP	D			QAT	SPA	POR	FRA	CAT	GBR	NED	GER	ITA	IND	CZE	RSM	ARA	JPN	MAL	AUS	VAL											
2012	Moto3	Red Bull KTM Ajo	KTM RC250GP	D	11	(Germany) Sandro Cortese	**3**	3	**1**	6	2	3	**2**	**1**	3	**2**	3	**1**	2	6	1	**1**	2						1st	325	—N/a		1st	346
2012	Moto3	Red Bull KTM Ajo	KTM RC250GP	D	52	(United Kingdom) Danny Kent	8	Ret	8	Ret	20	6	3	Ret	5	12	7	12	4	**1**	6	5	1						4th	154	—N/a		1st	346
2012	Moto3	Red Bull KTM Ajo	KTM RC250GP	D	61	(Australia) Arthur Sissis	7	Ret	13	5	22	8	16	9	Ret	11	14	10	9	11	11	3	19						12th	84	—N/a		1st	346
2012	Moto3	AirAsia-SIC-Ajo	KTM RC250GP	D	63	(Malaysia) Zulfahmi Khairuddin	6	10	4	Ret	8	9	11	6	9	6	Ret	11	Ret	5	**2**	Ret	3						7th	128	—N/a		1st	346
2013	Moto3	Red Bull KTM Ajo	KTM RC250GP	D			QAT	AME	SPA	FRA	ITA	CAT	NED	GER	IND	CZE	GBR	RSM	ARA	MAL	AUS	JPN	VAL											
2013	Moto3	Red Bull KTM Ajo	KTM RC250GP	D	39	(Spain) Luis Salom	**1**	3	2	3	1	**1**	1	2	5	1	1	4	4	**1**	**3**	Ret	14						3rd	302	—N/a		1st	425
2013	Moto3	Red Bull KTM Ajo	KTM RC250GP	D	61	(Australia) Arthur Sissis	8	12	12	13	18	10	8	10	6	14	24	15	9	19	16	16	18						15th	59	—N/a		1st	425
2013	Moto3	Red Bull KTM Ajo	KTM RC250GP	D	63	(Malaysia) Zulfahmi Khairuddin	6	7	7	Ret	11	9	17	16	7	15	20	6	Ret	DNS	11	Ret	13						12th	68	—N/a		1st	425
2013	Moto3	Touchline–SIC–AJO	KTM RC250GP	D	79	(Malaysia) Aizat Malik														Ret									NC	0	—N/a		1st	425
2013	Moto3	Touchline–SIC–AJO	KTM RC250GP	D	80	(Malaysia) Hafiq Azmi														Ret									NC	0	—N/a		1st	425
2014	Moto3	Red Bull KTM Ajo	KTM RC250GP	D			QAT	AME	ARG	SPA	FRA	ITA	CAT	NED	GER	IND	CZE	GBR	RSM	ARA	JPN	AUS	MAL	VAL										
2014	Moto3	Red Bull KTM Ajo	KTM RC250GP	D	8	(Australia) Jack Miller	1	**1**	**3**	**4**	1	Ret	4	**Ret**	**1**	**3**	5	6	**3**	27	5	1	**2**	1					2nd	276	—N/a		1st	384
2014	Moto3	Red Bull KTM Ajo	KTM RC250GP	D	98	(Czech Republic) Karel Hanika	14	10	Ret	19	Ret	10	14	Ret	Ret	13	15	12	Ret	23	12	13	9	10					18th	44	—N/a		1st	384
2014	Moto3	SIC–AJO	KTM RC250GP	D	38	(Malaysia) Hafiq Azmi	Ret	24	16	24	16	Ret	Ret	29	18	24	28	20	23	19	18	18	13	23					28th	3	—N/a		1st	384
2014	Moto3	SIC–AJO	KTM RC250R	D	88	(Malaysia) Hafiza Rofa																	20						NC	0	—N/a		1st	384
2014	Moto3	Avant Tecno; Husqvarna Ajo	Husqvarna FR250GP	D	31	(Finland) Niklas Ajo	26	14	8	10	Ret	5	8	Ret		Ret	12	10	Ret	25	Ret	9	Ret	Ret					15th	52	—N/a		4th	156
2014	Moto3	Avant Tecno; Husqvarna Ajo	Husqvarna FR250GP	D	91	(Argentina) Gabriel Rodrigo									22														NC	0	—N/a		4th	156
2014	Moto3	Red Bull; Husqvarna Ajo	Husqvarna FR250GP	D	52	(United Kingdom) Danny Kent	13	8	9	11	13	15	17	8	5	12	3	9	12	3	**6**	20	4	4					8th	129	—N/a		4th	156
2015	Moto2	Ajo Motorsport	Kalex Moto2	D			QAT	AME	ARG	SPA	FRA	ITA	CAT	NED	GER	IND	CZE	GBR	RSM	ARA	JPN	AUS	MAL	VAL										
2015	Moto2	Ajo Motorsport	Kalex Moto2	D	5	(France) Johann Zarco	8	2	**1**	2	3	2	**1**	**1**	**2**	2	**1**	1	**1**	6	**1**	7	1	7					1st	352	—N/a		1st	445
2015	Moto3	Red Bull KTM Ajo	KTM RC250GP	D	41	(South Africa) Brad Binder	10	5	5	3	Ret	10	9	7	7	8	3	Ret	5	Ret	17	3	2	4					6th	159	—N/a		2nd	341
2015	Moto3	Red Bull KTM Ajo	KTM RC250GP	D	44	(Portugal) Miguel Oliveira	16	Ret	**4**	2	8	1	5	1	DNS	15	8	13	2	1	2	1	1	1					2nd	254	—N/a		2nd	341
2015	Moto3	Red Bull KTM Ajo	KTM RC250GP	D	98	(Czech Republic) Karel Hanika	13	10	7	22	20	28	Ret	8	13	12	26	Ret	21	Ret	8	14	Ret	Ret					18th	43	—N/a		2nd	341
2016	Moto2	Ajo Motorsport	Kalex Moto2	D			QAT	ARG	AME	SPA	FRA	ITA	CAT	NED	GER	AUT	CZE	GBR	RSM	ARA	JPN	AUS	MAL	VAL										
2016	Moto2	Ajo Motorsport	Kalex Moto2	D	5	(France) Johann Zarco	12	1	3	5	24	1	**1**	2	1	**1**	**11**	22	**4**	8	**2**	12	**1**	**1**					1st	276	—N/a		1st	450
2016	Moto2	Ajo Motorsport	Kalex Moto2	D	45	(Japan) Tetsuta Nagashima														23	14								32nd	2	—N/a		1st	450
2016	Moto3	Red Bull KTM Ajo	KTM RC250GP	D	41	(South Africa) Brad Binder	2	3	3	1	1	1	2	12	8	2	Ret	1	1	2	2	1	17	1					1st	319	—N/a		1st	382
2016	Moto3	Red Bull KTM Ajo	KTM RC250GP	D	64	(Netherlands) Bo Bendsneyder	14	22	22	21	16	18	11	9	12	7	7	3	Ret	15	18	10	3	13					14th	78	—N/a		1st	382
2017	Moto2	Ajo Motorsport	KTM RC12	D			QAT	ARG	AME	SPA	FRA	ITA	CAT	NED	GER	CZE	AUT	GBR	RSM	ARA	JPN	AUS	MAL	VAL										
2017	Moto2	Ajo Motorsport	KTM RC12	D	41	(South Africa) Brad Binder	20	9				10	17	13	7	12	7	9	4	5	Ret	2	2	3					8th	125	—N/a		2nd	248
2017	Moto2	Ajo Motorsport	KTM RC12	D	44	(Portugal) Miguel Oliveira	4	**2**	6	3	17	5	3	5	2	3	Ret	8	Ret	**3**	7	1	1	1					3nd	241	—N/a		2nd	248
2017	Moto2	Ajo Motorsport	KTM RC12	D	88	(Spain) Ricard Cardus			14	14	13																		29th	7	—N/a		2nd	248
2017	Moto3	Red Bull KTM Ajo	KTM RC250GP	D	23	(Italy) Niccolò Antonelli	7	Ret	14	22	Ret	16	11	DNS		24	Ret	16	Ret	18	2	Ret	Ret	14					18th	38	—N/a		2nd	266
2017	Moto3	Red Bull KTM Ajo	KTM RC250GP	D	64	(Netherlands) Bo Bendsneyder	26	23	DNS	11	9	12	15	Ret	8	4	Ret	Ret	6	17	9	16	10	12					15th	65	—N/a		2nd	266
2017	Moto3	Red Bull KTM Ajo	KTM RC250GP	D	52	(United Kingdom) Danny Kent					10				Ret														32nd	6	—N/a		2nd	266
2018	Moto2	Ajo Motorsport	KTM RC12	D			QAT	ARG	AME	SPA	FRA	ITA	CAT	NED	GER	CZE	AUT	GBR	RSM	ARA	THA	JPN	AUS	MAL	VAL									
2018	Moto2	Ajo Motorsport	KTM RC12	D	41	(South Africa) Brad Binder	6	Ret	6	6	9	6	6	7	1	6	6	C	8	**1**	4	5	1	8	Ret				3rd	201	1st	498	2nd	345
2018	Moto2	Ajo Motorsport	KTM RC12	D	44	(Portugal) Miguel Oliveira	5	3	3	2	6	1	2	6	4	1	2	C	2	7	3	3	11	2	1				2nd	297	1st	498	2nd	345
2018	Moto3	Red Bull KTM Ajo	KTM RC250GP	D	25	(Spain) Raúl Fernández									9														28th	16	12th	64	2nd	353
2018	Moto3	Red Bull KTM Ajo	KTM RC250GP	D	40	(South Africa) Darryn Binder	Ret	22	13	DNS	11	13	Ret	7		23	19	C	8	18	Ret	3	12	7	19				17th	57	12th	64	2nd	353
2018	Moto3	Red Bull KTM Ajo	KTM RC250GP	D	61	(Turkey) Can Öncü																			1				24th	25	12th	64	2nd	353
2019	Moto2	Red Bull Ajo Motorsport	KTM RC12	D			QAT	ARG	AME	SPA	FRA	ITA	CAT	NED	GER	CZE	AUT	GBR	RSM	ARA	THA	JPN	AUS	MAL	VAL									
2019	Moto2	Red Bull Ajo Motorsport	KTM RC12	D	41	(South Africa) Brad Binder	12	6	Ret	5	4	15	11	2	2	Ret	1	3	6	1	2	12	1	1	1				2nd	259	3rd	353	2nd	281
2019	Moto2	Red Bull Ajo Motorsport	KTM RC12	D	88	(Spain) Jorge Martín	15	Ret	15	Ret	20	16	15	Ret	9	13	7	12	12	9	6	3	2	Ret	5				11th	94	3rd	353	2nd	281
2019	Moto3	Red Bull KTM Ajo	KTM RC250GP	D	53	(Turkey) Deniz Öncü										18	17		16	24	19								35th	0	16th	8	2nd	347
2019	Moto3	Red Bull KTM Ajo	KTM RC250GP	D	61	(Turkey) Can Öncü	18	26	Ret	18	16	18	Ret	16	14	14	Ret	24	WD			18	16	20	12				31st	8	16th	8	2nd	347
2019	MotoE	Ajo MotoE	Energica Ego Corsa	M			GER	AUT	RSM1	RSM2	VAL1	VAL2																						
2019	MotoE	Ajo MotoE	Energica Ego Corsa	M	44	(France) Lucas Mahias					DNS	DNS																	NC	0	—N/a			
2019	MotoE	Ajo MotoE	Energica Ego Corsa	M	66	(Finland) Niki Tuuli	**1**	15	Ret	DNS																			15th	26	—N/a			
Season	Class	Team	Motorcycle	Tyre	No.	Rider	1	2	3	4	5	6	7	8	9	10	11	12	13	14	15	16	17	18	19	20	21	22	RC	Points	TC	Points	MC	Points
2020	Moto2	Red Bull KTM Ajo	Kalex Moto2	D			QAT	SPA	ANC	CZE	AUT	STY	RSM	EMI	CAT	FRA	ARA	TER	EUR	VAL	POR													
2020	Moto2	Red Bull KTM Ajo	Kalex Moto2	D	45	(Japan) Tetsuta Nagashima	1	2	11	11	Ret	4	Ret	23	12	21	9	14	12	12	14								8th	91	3rd	251	1st	375
2020	Moto2	Red Bull KTM Ajo	Kalex Moto2	D	54	(Italy) Mattia Pasini								16															NC	0	3rd	251	1st	375
2020	Moto2	Red Bull KTM Ajo	Kalex Moto2	D	88	(Spain) Jorge Martín	20	**3**	6	8	1	2			Ret	Ret	3	6	2	1	6								5th	160	3rd	251	1st	375
2020	Moto3	Red Bull KTM Ajo	KTM RC250GP	D	25	(Spain) Raúl Fernández	10	6	6	**6**	**9**	8	Ret	**6**	13	7	**3**	**12**	1	3	**1**								4th	159	4th	200	2nd	318
2020	Moto3	Red Bull KTM Ajo	KTM RC250GP	D	27	(Japan) Kaito Toba	14	19	11	11	20	NC	17	9	18	Ret	11	3	Ret	Ret	15								18th	41	4th	200	2nd	318
2020	MotoE	Avant Ajo MotoE	Energica Ego Corsa	M			SPA	ANC	RSM	EMI1	EMI2	FRA	FRA																					
2020	MotoE	Avant Ajo MotoE	Energica Ego Corsa	M	66	(Finland) Niki Tuuli	11	DNS	17	13	12	3	1																6th	53	—N/a			
2021	Moto2	Red Bull KTM Ajo	Kalex Moto2	D			QAT	DOH	POR	SPA	FRA	ITA	CAT	GER	NED	STY	AUT	GBR	ARA	RSM	AME	EMI	ALR	VAL										
2021	Moto2	Red Bull KTM Ajo	Kalex Moto2	D	25	(Spain) Raúl Fernández	5	3	1	5	**1**	**2**	2	**Ret**	**1**	7	1	Ret	1	**1**	**1**	Ret	**2**	1					2nd	307	1st	618	1st	450
2021	Moto2	Red Bull KTM Ajo	Kalex Moto2	D	87	(Australia) Remy Gardner	2	2	3	**4**	2	1	**1**	1	2	**4**	7	1	2	2	Ret	7	1	10					1st	311	1st	618	1st	450
2021	Moto3	Red Bull KTM Ajo	KTM RC250GP	D	5	(Spain) Jaume Masià	1	**9**	9	21	Ret	2	4	Ret	20	4	6	6	10	5	**4**	2	19	3					4th	171	1st	430	1st	369
2021	Moto3	Red Bull KTM Ajo	KTM RC250GP	D	37	(Spain) Pedro Acosta	2	1	1	1	8	8	7	1	4	1	4	11	Ret	7	8	3	1	**Ret**					1st	259	1st	430	1st	369
2021	MotoE	Avant Ajo MotoE	Energica Ego Corsa	M			SPA	FRA	CAT	NED	AUT	RSM1	RSM2																					
2021	MotoE	Avant Ajo MotoE	Energica Ego Corsa	M	78	(Japan) Hikari Okubo	7	Ret	9	8	5	Ret	6																11th	45	—N/a			
2022	Moto2	Red Bull KTM Ajo	Kalex Moto2	D			QAT	INA	ARG	AME	POR	SPA	FRA	ITA	CAT	GER	NED	GBR	AUT	RSM	ARA	JPN	THA	AUS	MAL	VAL								
2022	Moto2	Red Bull KTM Ajo	Kalex Moto2	D	37	(Spain) Augusto Fernández	4	5	Ret	9	Ret	4	1	5	3	1	1	**1**	5	3	**3**	2'	7^{‡}	Ret	4	2			1st	271.5	1st	448.5	1st	477.5
2022	Moto2	Red Bull KTM Ajo	Kalex Moto2	D	51	(Spain) Pedro Acosta	12	9	7	Ret	Ret	20	**Ret**	1	6	2		DNS	4	6	1	7	16	2	Ret	1			5th	177	1st	448.5	1st	477.5
2022	Moto3	Red Bull KTM Ajo	KTM RC250GP	D	5	(Spain) Jaume Masià	Ret	7	Ret	1	2	3	1	17	8	12	Ret	2	18	2	8	Ret	8	15	4	22			6th	177	4th	280	3rd	323
2022	Moto3	Red Bull KTM Ajo	KTM RC250GP	D	96	(Spain) Daniel Holgado	16	9	7	Ret	Ret	9	11	Ret	Ret	6	6	NC	**8**	5	3	Ret	11	Ret	7	10			10th	103	4th	280	3rd	323
2022	MotoE	Avant Ajo MotoE	Energica Ego Corsa	M			SPA1	SPA2	FRA1	FRA2	ITA1	ITA2	NED1	NED2	AUT1	AUT2	RSM1	RSM2																
2022	MotoE	Avant Ajo MotoE	Energica Ego Corsa	M	78	(Japan) Hikari Okubo	6	5	3	6	11	Ret	13	11^{‡}	4	7	7	9											6th	95.5	—N/a			
2023	Moto2	Red Bull KTM Ajo	Kalex Moto2	D			POR	ARG	AME	SPA	FRA	ITA	GER	NED	GBR	AUT	CAT	RSM	IND	JPN	INA	AUS	THA	MAL	QAT	VAL								
2023	Moto2	Red Bull KTM Ajo	Kalex Moto2	D	37	(Spain) Pedro Acosta	1	12	1	2	Ret	1	**1**	3	**3**	**2**	6	1	1	3	1	9	2	2	8	12			1st	328.5	1st	417.5	1st	462.5
2023	Moto2	Red Bull KTM Ajo	Kalex Moto2	D	75	(Spain) Albert Arenas	8	9	12	8	DNS	23	9	9	14	Ret	3	DNS	14	18	15	14	7	8	21	10			15th	79	1st	417.5	1st	462.5
2023	Moto3	Red Bull KTM Ajo	KTM RC250GP	D	53	(Turkey) Deniz Öncü	10	24	6	**9**	6	**2**	1	3	11	1	**11**	3	14	Ret	8	1	**5**	11	3	5			5th	212	3rd	344	1st	394
2023	Moto3	Red Bull KTM Ajo	KTM RC250GP	D	99	(Spain) José Antonio Rueda	4	23	10	5	9	14	13	6	8	11	3	9	10	10	5	18	16	Ret	16	6			9th	111	3rd	344	1st	394
2024	Moto2	Red Bull KTM Ajo	Kalex Moto2	P			QAT	POR	AME	SPA	FRA	CAT	ITA	NED	GER	GBR	AUT	ARA	RSM	EMI	INA	JPN	AUS	THA	MAL	SLD								
2024	Moto2	Red Bull KTM Ajo	Kalex Moto2	P	13	(Italy) Celestino Vietti	9	7	10	9		Ret	7	10	**5**	3	**1**	10	Ret	1	12	7	DNS		1	Ret			7th	165	8th	214	1st	437
2024	Moto2	Red Bull KTM Ajo	Kalex Moto2	P	53	(Turkey) Deniz Öncü	15	20	22	14	18	19	13				11	3	19	Ret	9	17	21	10	7	21			20th	49	8th	214	1st	437
2024	Moto3	Red Bull KTM Ajo	KTM RC250GP	P	21	(Spain) Vicente Peréz	Ret	13		16																			24th	3	7th	173	2nd	333
2024	Moto3	Red Bull KTM Ajo	KTM RC250GP	P	83	(Spain) Álvaro Carpe																				19			30th	0	7th	173	2nd	333
2024	Moto3	Red Bull KTM Ajo	KTM RC250GP	P	85	(Spain) Xabi Zurutuza			13	22	16	19	Ret	19	16	Ret	18	8	18	19	Ret	18	17	18	14	22			23rd	13	7th	173	2nd	333
2024	Moto3	Red Bull KTM Ajo	KTM RC250GP	P	99	(Spain) José Antonio Rueda	Ret	**2**	DNS	WD	8	3	15	4	Ret	9	7	1	Ret	10	11	5	9	16	3	4			20th	49	7th	173	2nd	333
2025	Moto2	Red Bull KTM Ajo	Kalex Moto2	P			THA	ARG	AME	QAT	SPA	FRA	GBR	ARA	ITA	NED	GER	CZE	AUT	HUN	CAT	RSM	JPN	INA	AUS	MAL	POR	VAL						
2025	Moto2	Red Bull KTM Ajo	Kalex Moto2	P	17	(Spain) Daniel Muñoz								15					14	20	3	12	Ret	17	21	7	11	23	20th	37	7th	234	1st	518
2025	Moto2	Red Bull KTM Ajo	Kalex Moto2	P	53	(Turkey) Deniz Öncü	12	14	Ret	2	5	17	19	1	6	Ret	1	13											12th	100	7th	234	1st	518
2025	Moto2	Red Bull KTM Ajo	Kalex Moto2	P	95	(Netherlands) Collin Veijer	20	24	10	13	14	Ret			20	14	16	16	8	5	9	21	10	8	12	9	2	4	15th	97	7th	234	1st	518
2025	Moto3	Red Bull KTM Ajo	KTM RC250GP	P	51	(Spain) Brian Uriarte																					13	17	28th	11	1st	583	1st	540
2025	Moto3	Red Bull KTM Ajo	KTM RC250GP	P	83	(Spain) Álvaro Carpe	2	NC	6	11	8	4	4	3	**2**	4	5	12	10	9	13	10	14	Ret	3	5	5	2	4th	215	1st	583	1st	540
2025	Moto3	Red Bull KTM Ajo	KTM RC250GP	P	99	(Spain) José Antonio Rueda	1	3	1	Ret	**1**	1	**1**	**8**	4	**1**	3	1	5	5	2	1	**2**	1	1	DNS			1st	365	1st	583	1st	540
2026	Moto2	Red Bull KTM Ajo	Kalex Moto2	P			THA	BRA	AME	SPA	FRA	CAT	ITA	HUN	CZE	NED	GER	GBR	ARA	RSM	AUT	JPN	INA	AUS	MAL	QAT	POR	VAL						
2026	Moto2	Red Bull KTM Ajo	Kalex Moto2	P	95	(Spain) Collin Veijer	5	8	Ret	**3**	Ret	Ret	9	23	11	9	9	Ret	Ret	2	DNS		11	C	7	Ret			11th*	89.5*	9th*	145.5*	1st	442.5*
2026	Moto2	Red Bull KTM Ajo	Kalex Moto2	P	98	(Spain) José Antonio Rueda	Ret	21	15	20	17	12	13	11	10	17	8	19	17	21	12	10	10	C	11	8			16th*	56*	9th*	145.5*	1st	442.5*
2026	Moto2	Red Bull KTM Ajo	Kalex Moto2	P	40	(Poland) Milan Pawelec																24							0*	35th*	9th*	145.5*	1st	442.5*
2026	Moto3	Red Bull KTM Ajo	KTM RC250GP	P																											9th*	145.5*	1st	442.5*
2026	Moto3	Red Bull KTM Ajo	KTM RC250GP	P	51	(Spain) Brian Uriarte	6	10	6	10	14	DSQ	1	4	2	6	**1**	19	5	3	**2**	4	**3**	C	9	14			4th*	207*	2nd*	423*	1st	470*
2026	Moto3	Red Bull KTM Ajo	KTM RC250GP	P	83	(Spain) Álvaro Carpe	4	4	**3**	4	Ret	2	2	3	6	Ret	11	2	4	17	3	3	Ret	C	3	5			3rd*	216*	2nd*	423*	1st	470*

* Season still in progress.
