= 2016 FIM CEV Moto3 Junior World Championship =

2016 FIM CEV Moto3 Junior World Championship
Previous:	2015	Next:	2017
Support series: FIM CEV Moto2 European Championship; FIM CEV Superbike European Championship

The 2016 FIM CEV Moto3 Junior World Championship was the fifth CEV Moto3 season and the third under the FIM banner. The season was held over 12 races at 8 meetings, beginning on 17 April at Valencia and finishing on 20 November at the same venue.

== Calendar ==
Round	Date	Circuit	Pole position	Fastest lap	Race winner	Winning constructor	Sources
1	17 April	(Spain) Valencia	(Italy) Lorenzo Dalla Porta	(Spain) Jeremy Alcoba	(Spain) Marcos Ramírez	(Austria) KTM	
1	17 April	(Spain) Valencia	(Italy) Lorenzo Dalla Porta	(Italy) Lorenzo Dalla Porta	(Japan) Kaito Toba	(Japan) Honda	
2	7 May	(France) Le Mans	(Italy) Lorenzo Dalla Porta	(Italy) Lorenzo Dalla Porta	(Italy) Lorenzo Dalla Porta	(Sweden) Husqvarna	
3	29 May	(Spain) Aragón	(Italy) Lorenzo Dalla Porta	(Spain) Marcos Ramírez	(Spain) Marcos Ramírez	(Austria) KTM	
4	12 June	(Spain) Catalunya	(Spain) Alonso López	(Italy) Lorenzo Dalla Porta	(Italy) Lorenzo Dalla Porta	(Sweden) Husqvarna	
4	12 June	(Spain) Catalunya	(Spain) Alonso López	(Italy) Tony Arbolino	(Italy) Lorenzo Dalla Porta	(Sweden) Husqvarna	
5	3 July	(Spain) Albacete	(Italy) Lorenzo Dalla Porta	(Japan) Kaito Toba	(Italy) Lorenzo Dalla Porta	(Sweden) Husqvarna	
6	28 August	(Portugal) Algarve	(Italy) Lorenzo Dalla Porta	(Italy) Lorenzo Dalla Porta	(Spain) Marcos Ramírez	(Austria) KTM	
7	2 October	(Spain) Jerez	(Czech Republic) Karel Hanika	(Czech Republic) Karel Hanika	(Spain) Marcos Ramírez	(Austria) KTM	
7	2 October	(Spain) Jerez	(Czech Republic) Karel Hanika	(Italy) Tony Arbolino	(Italy) Tony Arbolino	(Japan) Honda	
8	20 November	(Spain) Valencia	(Spain) Marcos Ramírez	(Spain) Raúl Fernández	(Spain) Marcos Ramírez	(Austria) KTM	
8	20 November	(Spain) Valencia	(Spain) Marcos Ramírez	(Spain) Jaume Masiá	(Spain) Raúl Fernández	(Sweden) Husqvarna	

== Entry list ==
Team	Bike	No.	Rider	Rounds
(Denmark) Team Jespersen	Honda	4	(Denmark) Simon Jespersen	3
(Denmark) HMA Llimsual Racing	KTM	4	(Czech Republic) Filip Salač	5–6, 8
(Spain) Junior Team Estrella Galicia 0,0	Honda	5	(Spain) Jaume Masiá	1, 3–8
(Spain) Junior Team Estrella Galicia 0,0	Honda	21	(Spain) Alonso López	1–5, 7-8
(Spain) Junior Team Estrella Galicia 0,0	Honda	52	(Spain) Jeremy Alcoba	All
(Germany) Freudenberg Racing Team	KTM	7	(Germany) Tim Georgi	1, 3–8
(Germany) Freudenberg Racing Team	KTM	92	(Czech Republic) Karel Hanika	5–8
(Italy) MotoMex Team Moto3	Mahindra	8	(Mexico) Gabriel Martínez-Ábrego	All
(Spain) Larresport	Honda	9	(Spain) Francisco Gómez	1
(Spain) Larresport	Honda	18	(Spain) Aleix Viu	All
(Spain) Larresport	TSR Honda	29	(France) Lyvann Luchel	1, 3–8
(Spain) Procercasa – 42 Motorsport	KTM	10	(Italy) Filippo Fuligni	All
(Spain) Procercasa – 42 Motorsport	KTM	16	(Spain) Álex Ruiz	1–5, 7-8
(Spain) Procercasa – 42 Motorsport	KTM	43	(Spain) Vicente Pérez	5–8
(Spain) Procercasa – 42 Motorsport	KTM	73	(Italy) Davide Pizzoli	1, 3–4
(Spain) Procercasa – 42 Motorsport	KTM	76	(Kazakhstan) Makar Yurchenko	1–5
(Spain) Procercasa – 42 Motorsport	KTM	99	(France) Enzo Boulom	1–4
(Spain) MRW Mahindra Aspar Team	Mahindra	11	(Spain) Albert Arenas	1–5
(Spain) MRW Mahindra Aspar Team	Mahindra	27	(Spain) Borja Sánchez	6
(Spain) MRW Mahindra Aspar Team	Mahindra	47	(Spain) Aaron Polanco	All
(Spain) Mahindra – Aspar Junior Team	Mahindra	12	(Italy) Marco Bezzecchi	1–7
(Spain) Mahindra – Aspar Junior Team	Mahindra	62	(Italy) Stefano Manzi	1–7
(Netherlands) Dutch Racing Team	Honda	13	(Netherlands) Walid Soppe	All
(Italy) Cruciani Racing	CR016H	14	(Italy) Matteo Ghidini	3–8
(Spain) Grupo Machado-CAME	Honda	19	(Spain) Rufino Florido	1–2
(Spain) Grupo Machado-CAME	Honda	61	(Italy) Matteo Romeo	6
(Spain) Laglisse Academy	Husqvarna	23	(Spain) Raúl Fernández	All
(Spain) Laglisse Academy	Husqvarna	48	(Italy) Lorenzo Dalla Porta	All
(Spain) Laglisse Academy	Husqvarna	73	(Italy) Davide Pizzoli	5–7
(Spain) XCTech	Honda	24	(Australia) Chandler Cooper	1, 3–8
(Spain) XCTech	Honda	66	(Spain) Héctor Garzó	All
(Italy) TM Racing Factory Team	TM	30	(Italy) Edoardo Sintoni	4
(Japan) Asia Talent Team	Honda	31	(Japan) Kazuki Masaki	All
(Japan) Asia Talent Team	Honda	32	(Japan) Kaito Toba	All
(Japan) Asia Talent Team	Honda	33	(Japan) Ayumu Sasaki	All
(Indonesia) Astra Honda Racing Team	Honda	34	(Indonesia) Andi Izdihar	All
Asia Talent Team – AP Honda Racing Thailand	Honda	35	(Thailand) Nakarin Atiratphuvapat	All
(Netherlands) Ernst Dubbink Eveno Racing Team	Honda	36	(Netherlands) Sander Kroeze	4
(Spain) Leopard Junior Stratos	KTM	42	(Spain) Marcos Ramírez	All
(Spain) Leopard Junior Stratos	KTM	67	(Spain) Gerard Riu	All
(Spain) Team H43 Blumaq	BEON Honda	19	(Spain) Rufino Florido	6-8
(Spain) Team H43 Blumaq	BEON Honda	41	(Spain) Marc García	5, 8
(Spain) Team H43 Blumaq	BEON Honda	43	(Spain) Vicente Pérez	2–4
(Italy) Sic58 Squadra Corse	Honda	44	(Italy) Tony Arbolino	All
(Italy) Sic58 Squadra Corse	Honda	55	(Italy) Yari Montella	All
(United Kingdom) Racing Steps Foundation	FTR KTM	69	(United Kingdom) Rory Skinner	1, 3–8
(Sweden) Robnor and Made to Measure	Robnor-Honda	70	(Sweden) Lukas Wendeborn	1, 3, 5
(Italy) Junior Team VR46 Riders Academy	KTM	71	(Italy) Dennis Foggia	All
(Italy) Junior Team VR46 Riders Academy	KTM	72	(Italy) Celestino Vietti	8
(Italy) Miralux Pos Corse	TM	80	(Italy) Bruno Ieraci	4, 8
(Italy) 3570 Racing Team	Mahindra	81	(Italy) Stefano Nepa	1–2
(Italy) MF84 Plus+Ton Althea	KTM	84	(Italy) Nicholas Spinelli	4
(Sweden) STAROL Racing	KTM	88	(Sweden) Johnny Rotvik	1–2, 4–5, 7-8
(Italy) MTR MotoGP Team	GEO	96	(Italy) Manuel Pagliani	3
(Germany) Saxoprint RZT	KTM	97	(Germany) Maximilian Kappler	All
(Italy) Team Pileri Racing	Honda	98	(Italy) Walter Sulis	1, 3–4
(Spain) TMR Came Machado	KTM	99	(France) Enzo Boulom	4–6, 8

== Championship standings ==
Scoring system

Points are awarded to the top fifteen finishers. A rider has to finish the race to earn points.

Position	1st	2nd	3rd	4th	5th	6th	7th	8th	9th	10th	11th	12th	13th	14th	15th
Points	25	20	16	13	11	10	9	8	7	6	5	4	3	2	1

=== Riders' championship ===
Pos.	Rider	Bike	VAL (Spain)		LMS (France)	ARA (Spain)	CAT (Spain)		ALB (Spain)	ALG (Portugal)	JER (Spain)		VAL (Spain)		Pts
1	(Italy) Lorenzo Dalla Porta	Husqvarna	5	3	1	3	1	1	1	2	2	8	13	2	214
2	(Spain) Marcos Ramírez	KTM	1	2	4	1	12	Ret	2	1	1	2	1	13	205
3	(Spain) Raúl Fernández	Husqvarna	Ret	6	9	5	19	6	4	3	3	7	2	1	137
4	(Japan) Kaito Toba	Honda	10	1	2	4	Ret	Ret	3	6	Ret	4	Ret	Ret	103
5	(Spain) Alonso López	Honda	9	10	13	2	2	7	Ret		20	Ret	5	5	87
6	(Japan) Ayumu Sasaki	Honda	4	Ret	10	9	3	4	9	Ret	6	5			83
7	(Italy) Dennis Foggia	KTM	2	Ret	5	7	9	13	Ret	Ret	4	16	Ret	3	79
8	(Spain) Albert Arenas	Mahindra	8	8	11	15	5	3	7		8	DNS	4	Ret	79
9	(Italy) Tony Arbolino	Honda	Ret	15	14	6	Ret	2	10	5	17	1	Ret	DNS	75
10	(Japan) Kazuki Masaki	Honda	12	7	8	10	7	5	8	17	5	14	Ret	12	72
11	(Spain) Jeremy Alcoba	Honda	3	5	6	12	Ret	12	Ret	4	13	18	Ret	6	71
12	(Italy) Stefano Manzi	Mahindra	7	Ret	3	Ret	8	10	6	Ret	7	11			63
13	(Czech Republic) Karel Hanika	KTM							5	Ret	16	3	3	4	56
14	(Russia) Makar Yurchenko	KTM	6	4	15	14	6	11	23		12	21	Ret	Ret	45
15	(Spain) Jaume Masiá	Honda	Ret	Ret		13	4	Ret	15	7	9	15	Ret	Ret	34
16	(Spain) Gerard Riu	KTM	Ret	22	16	16	Ret	Ret	11	8	15	12	6	10	34
17	(Thailand) Nakarin Atiratphuvapat	Honda	Ret	20	7	17	Ret	8	14	10	14	10	Ret	Ret	33
18	(Italy) Marco Bezzecchi	Mahindra	Ret	11	18	8	Ret	15	Ret	9	Ret	6			31
19	(Spain) Vicente Pérez	BeOn			20	25	17	20							30
19	(Spain) Vicente Pérez	KTM							Ret	Ret	10	9	7	8	30
20	(Spain) Aaron Polanco	Mahindra	Ret	16	19	11	Ret	14	12	Ret	11	13	14	11	26
21	(Italy) Yari Montella	Honda	17	21	26	18	10	Ret	18	21	21	20	8	7	23
22	(France) Enzo Boulom	KTM	14	14	12	23	16	17	13	11					16
22	(France) Enzo Boulom	Mahindra											16	19	16
23	(United Kingdom) John McPhee	Peugeot					11	9							12
24	(Spain) Álex Ruiz	KTM	13	9	Ret	27	22	21	17		26	24	DNQ	DNQ	10
25	(Italy) Celestino Vietti Ramus	KTM											9	14	9
26	(Spain) Rufino Florido	Honda	11	12	23										9
26	(Spain) Rufino Florido	BeOn								18	24	Ret	24	Ret	9
27	(Italy) Davide Pizzoli	KTM	Ret	13		20	13	Ret							9
27	(Italy) Davide Pizzoli	Husqvarna							16	13	19	22			9
28	(United Kingdom) Rory Skinner	FTR KTM	Ret	Ret		28	15	DNS	19	Ret	Ret	DNS	27	9	8
29	(Italy) Stefano Nepa	Mahindra	19	23	22										6
29	(Italy) Stefano Nepa	KTM									18	23	10	28	6
30	(United Kingdom) Charlie Nesbitt	KTM											11	16	5
31	(Spain) José Julián García	KTM											12	15	5
32	(Indonesia) Andi Farid Izdihar	Honda	Ret	Ret	17	19	DNS	16	Ret	12	25	19	Ret	Ret	4
33	(Germany) Maximilian Kappler	KTM	16	17	21	21	20	19	20	14	23	25	22	27	2
34	(Italy) Bruno Ieraci	TM					14	Ret					Ret	18	2
35	(Italy) Filippo Fuligni	KTM	15	18	Ret	29	24	22	Ret	16	29	Ret	Ret	23	1
36	(Spain) Daniel Sáez	KTM											15	17	1
37	(Czech Republic) Filip Salač	KTM							Ret	15			20	21	1
	(Netherlands) Walid Soppe	Honda	Ret	DNS	Ret	22	18	18	Ret	Ret	22	17	Ret	DSQ	0
	(Germany) Tim Georgi	KTM	18	19		26	23	24	21	Ret	28	26	17	Ret	0
	(United Kingdom) Taz Taylor	FTR KTM											18	Ret	0
	(Mexico) Gabriel Martínez-Ábrego	Mahindra	22	25	24	34	31	26	24	19	32	Ret	21	Ret	0
	(Italy) Andrea Cavaliere	KTM											19	22	0
	(Spain) Aleix Viu	Honda	20	24	27	32	27	27	22	20	31	27	Ret	Ret	0
	(Japan) Keisuke Kurihara	Honda											23	20	0
	(Italy) Edoardo Sintoni	TM					21	23							0
	(Italy) Walter Sulis	Honda	21	Ret		31	26	Ret							0
	(France) Lyvann Luchel	TSR Honda	25	28		36	Ret	31	28	22	36	31	DNQ	DNQ	0
	(Australia) Chandler Cooper	Honda	DNQ	DNQ		DNQ									0
	(Australia) Chandler Cooper	Kalex KTM					30	30	Ret	23	37	32	DNQ	DNQ	0
	(Spain) Francisco Gómez	Honda	23	Ret											0
	(Spain) Héctor Garzó	Honda	24	27	25	33	25	25	26	Ret	33	28	DNQ	DNQ	0
	(Japan) Hiroki Nakamura	Honda											Ret	24	0
	(Italy) Matteo Romeo	Honda								24					0
	(Italy) Manuel Pagliani	GEO				24									0
	(Italy) Matteo Ghidini	CR016H				30	Ret	DNS	25	Ret	27	Ret	DNQ	DNQ	0
	(Italy) Anthony Groppi	KTM											25	29	0
	(Italy) Riccardo Rossi	Honda											Ret	25	0
	(Spain) Manuel González	Honda									30	Ret	26	26	0
	(Sweden) Johnny Rotvik	KTM	Ret	26	Ret		29	29	27		35	30	DNQ	DNQ	0
	(Sweden) Lukas Wendeborn	Honda	26	Ret		37			29						0
	(Netherlands) Sander Kroeze	Honda					28	28							0
	(Spain) Ángel García	Mahindra									34	29			0
	(Denmark) Simon Jespersen	Honda				35									0
	(Spain) Marc García	BeOn							Ret						0
	(Spain) Marc García	Honda											Ret	Ret	0
	(United Kingdom) Josh Owens	Kalex KTM											Ret	Ret	0
	(Italy) Nicholas Spinelli	KTM					Ret	Ret							0
	(Spain) Borja Sánchez	Mahindra								Ret					0
	(Spain) Ángel Lorente	MIR Racing											DNS	DNS	0
	(Spain) Víctor Rodríguez	Honda											DNQ	DNQ	0
	(Netherlands) Jerry van de Bunt	Honda											DNQ	DNQ	0
	(United States) Daniel Costilla	KTM											DNQ	DNQ	0
	(China) Heng Su	KTM											DNQ	DNQ	0
Pos.	Rider	Bike	VAL (Spain)		LMS (France)	ARA (Spain)	CAT (Spain)		ALB (Spain)	ALG (Portugal)	JER (Spain)		VAL (Spain)		Pts

=== Constructors' championship ===
Pos	Constructor	VAL (Spain)		LMS (France)	ARA (Spain)	CAT (Spain)		ALB (Spain)	ALG (Portugal)	JER (Spain)		VAL (Spain)		Points
1	(Sweden) Husqvarna	5	3	1	3	1	1	1	2	2	7	2	1	237
2	(Austria) KTM	1	2	4	1	6	11	2	1	1	2	1	3	229
3	(Japan) Honda	3	1	2	2	2	2	3	4	5	1	5	5	208
4	(India) Mahindra	7	8	3	8	5	3	6	9	7	6	4	10	123
5	(France) Peugeot						9							7
