= Makar Yurchenko =

Kazakhstani motorcycle racer

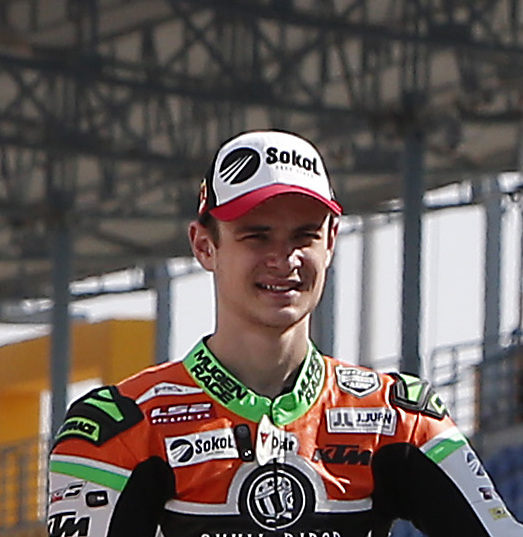
- Yurchenko in 2019
- Nationality: Kazakh
- Born: 29 July 1998 (age 28); Saint Petersburg, Russia
Motorcycle racing career statistics
Moto3 World Championship
Active years	2018–2019
Manufacturers	KTM, Honda
2019 championship position	24th (29 pts)
Starts / Wins / Podiums / Poles / F. laps / Points; 27 / 0 / 0 / 0 / 0 / 38

Makar Borisovich Yurchenko (Russian: Макар Борисович Юрченко; born 29 July 1998) is a Russian-born Kazakh motorcycle racer.

In 2014, 2016, 2017 and 2018, Yurchenko competed in the FIM CEV Moto3 Junior World Championship. In 2014, 2015 and 2016, he was a Red Bull MotoGP Rookies Cup contestant. In 2018 and 2019, he raced in the Moto3 World Championship.

== Career statistics ==
=== Red Bull MotoGP Rookies Cup ===
==== Races by year ====
(key) (Races in bold indicate pole position; races in italics indicate fastest lap)

Year	1	2	3	4	5	6	7	8	9	10	11	12	13	14	Pos	Pts
2014	JER1; 18	JER1; 20	MUG	ASS1	ASS2	SAC1	SAC2	BRN1; 22	BRN2; 18	SIL1	SIL2	MIS; 20	ARA1; 22	ARA2; Ret	NC	0
2015	JER1; 14	JER2; 14	ASS1; 11	ASS2; 9	SAC1; 10	SAC2; 15	BRN1; Ret	BRN2; Ret	SIL1; 8	SIL2; 6	MIS; 14	ARA1; 17	ARA2; 12		15th	47
2016	JER1; 5	JER2; 7	ASS1; DNS	ASS2; Ret	SAC1; 5	SAC2; 6	RBR1; 6	RBR2; 13	BRN1; 5	BRN2; 14	MIS	ARA1; 9	ARA2; 11		8th	79

=== FIM CEV Moto3 Junior World Championship ===
==== Races by year ====
(key) (Races in bold indicate pole position, races in italics indicate fastest lap)

Year	Bike	1	2	3	4	5	6	7	8	9	10	11	12	Pos	Pts
2014	KTM	JER1; 33	JER2; 31	LMS; DNS	ARA	CAT1	CAT2	ALB	NAV	ALG	VAL1	VAL2		NC	0
2016	KTM	VAL1; 6	VAL2; 4	LMS; 15	ARA; 14	CAT1; 6	CAT2; 11	ALB; 23	ALG	JER1; 12	JER2; 21	VAL1; Ret	VAL2; Ret	14th	45
2017	KTM	ALB; 2	**LMS**; 13	CAT1; Ret	CAT2; Ret	VAL1; 11	VAL2; 11	EST; Ret	JER1; 9	JER1; 3	ARA; 13	VAL1	VAL2	10th	59
2018	KTM	EST	VAL1	VAL2	FRA	CAT1	CAT2	ARA; Ret	JER1	JER2	ALB	VAL1	VAL2	30th	7
2018	Husqvarna	EST	VAL1	VAL2	FRA	CAT1	CAT2	ARA	JER1	JER2	ALB; 17	VAL1; Ret	VAL2; 9	30th	7

=== Grand Prix motorcycle racing ===
==== By season ====
Season	Class	Motorcycle	Team	Race	Win	Podium	Pole	FLap	Pts	Plcd
2018	Moto3	KTM	CIP - Green Power	7	0	0	0	0	9	30th
2018	Moto3	Honda	Marinelli Snipers Team	1	0	0	0	0	9	30th
2019	Moto3	KTM	BOE Skull Rider Mugen Race	19	0	0	0	0	29	24th
Total				**27**	**0**	**0**	**0**	**0**	**38**	

==== Races by year ====
(key) (Races in bold indicate pole position; races in italics indicate fastest lap)

Year	Class	Bike	1	2	3	4	5	6	7	8	9	10	11	12	13	14	15	16	17	18	19	Pos	Pts
2018	Moto3	KTM	QAT; 19	ARG; 24	AME; 19	SPA; 14	FRA; 13	ITA; Ret	CAT; 12	NED	GER	CZE	AUT	GBR	RSM	ARA	THA	JPN	AUS			30th	9
2018	Moto3	Honda																		MAL; 17	VAL	30th	9
2019	Moto3	KTM	QAT; 23	ARG; 20	AME; 18	SPA; Ret	FRA; 13	ITA; 15	CAT; Ret	NED; 18	GER; 20	CZE; 13	AUT; 7	GBR; 23	RSM; Ret	ARA; NC	THA; 15	JPN; 11	AUS; 18	MAL; 16	VAL; 9	24th	29
