= Jason Dupasquier =

Swiss motorcycle racer (2001–2021)

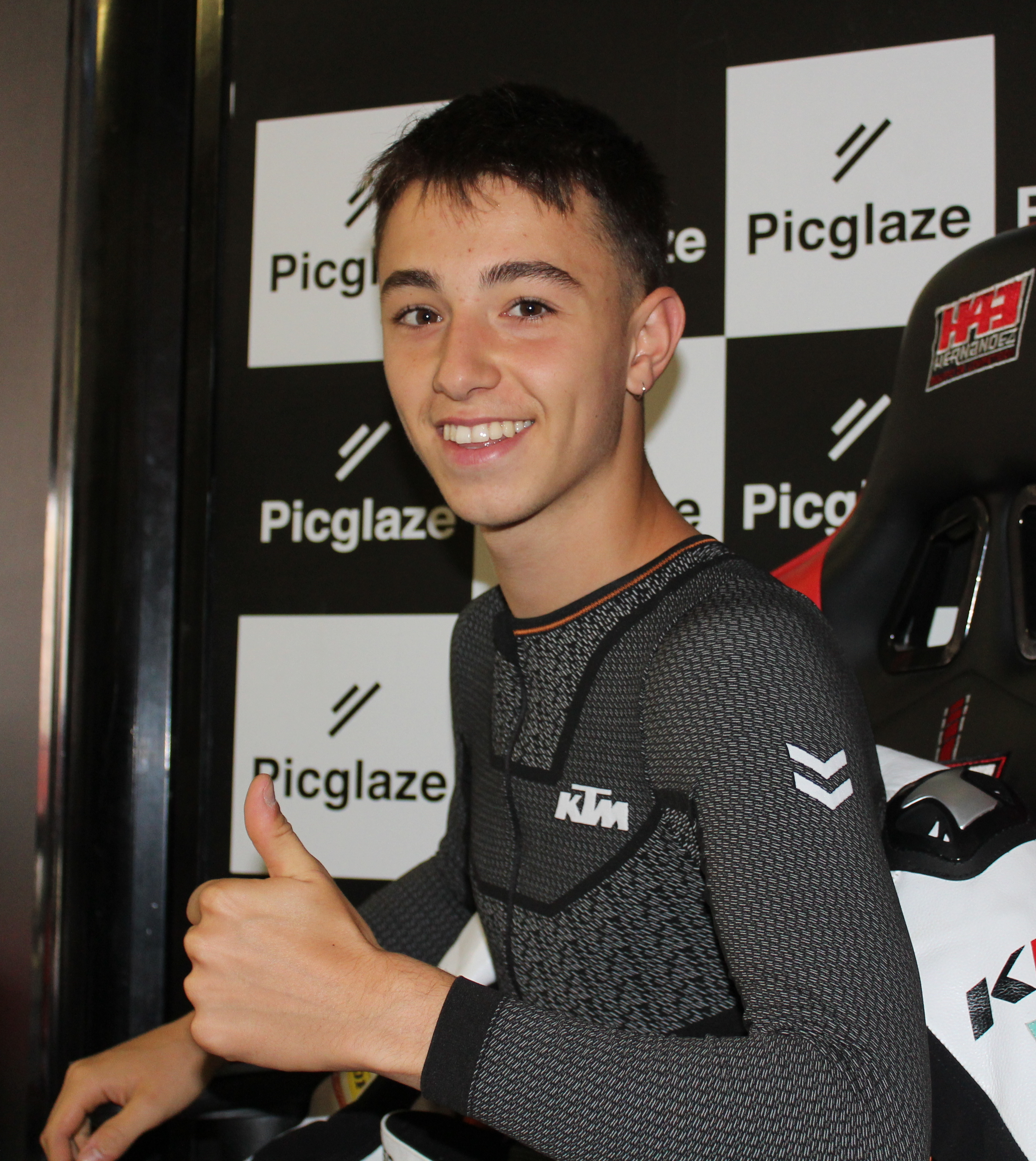
- Dupasquier in 2018
- Nationality: Swiss
- Born: 7 September 2001; Bulle, Switzerland
- Died: 30 May 2021 (aged 19); Florence, Tuscany, Italy
- Bike number: 50 (retired in honour in Moto3)
Motorcycle racing career statistics
Moto3 World Championship
Active years	2020–2021
Manufacturers	KTM
2021 championship position	24th (27 pts)
Starts / Wins / Podiums / Poles / F. laps / Points; 20 / 0 / 0 / 0 / 0 / 27

Jason Dupasquier (French pronunciation: [dʒɛzɔn dypaskje]; 7 September 2001 – 30 May 2021) was a Swiss motorcycle rider who competed in the Moto3 class in the motorcycle world championship until his death after a crash during qualifying at the 2021 Italian motorcycle Grand Prix. He was the son of Motocross rider Philippe Dupasquier.

== Career ==
Dupasquier began his racing career in 2011, where he won multiple SuperMoto Swiss championships and switched to circuit racing in 2016. He was set to debut in the Red Bull Rookies Cup in 2018, but suffered a femur injury that prevented him from doing so. Dupasquier debuted in the Red Bull Rookies Cup in 2019 and was soon awarded a two-year contract as a Moto3 rider, making his Moto3 debut in 2020. He was in his second season in the World Championship's lightweight class and was in the top-ten in the overall rankings going into the weekend at Mugello.

== Death ==
On 29 May 2021, Dupasquier was involved in a crash with Ayumu Sasaki and Jeremy Alcoba near the end of the day's qualifying session at the Mugello circuit of the Italian Grand Prix (Gran Premio d'Italia) in Scarperia.

Dupasquier appeared to fall between turns nine and ten and was hit by his own motorbike, and then by Sasaki's; the session was red-flagged immediately. In a later interview, Alcoba stated that he thought he had also run over Dupasquier. FIM (Fédération Internationale de Motocyclisme) medical intervention vehicles quickly arrived at the site and the rider was treated on the track for about 30 minutes prior to a medical helicopter arriving and airlifting him to hospital.

Dupasquier was taken to Careggi University Hospital, in Florence, Italy, where he underwent "thoracic surgery for a vascular lesion" and was also operated on for a brain injury, according to a statement from the MotoGP World Championship organization. He died from complications of his injuries on 30 May, aged 19, having been declared brain dead and taken off life support in the morning, surrounded by his family and close friends. Dupasquier's team, Prüstel GP, announced it would not be taking part in the day's race. Dupasquier's death was the first during a world championship event since Moto2 rider Luis Salom's fatal crash at Circuit de Barcelona-Catalunya during the second practice session of the 2016 Catalan motorcycle Grand Prix.

The MotoGP grid held a one-minute silence prior to Sunday's Italian Grand Prix. Fabio Quartararo, the world championship leader in the MotoGP class at the time, won the event and, in his victory lap, paused at Dupasquier's accident site (turn 9, Arrabbiata 2) and pointed to the sky. He also waved the Swiss flag when he arrived at the parc fermé.

== Legacy ==
On 18 June 2021, Dupasquier's racing number 50 was retired from the Moto3 class.

Following three teenage deaths during the 2021 motorcycle road racing season with ages 14, 15 and Dupasquier at 19, the organisers FIM and Dorna have introduced new minimum-age requirements from 2023, rising from 16 to 18 in major road racing competitions together with reduced grid sizes, and with other restrictions for lesser series.

== Career statistics ==
=== Red Bull MotoGP Rookies Cup ===
==== Races by year ====
(key) (Races in bold indicate pole position; races in italics indicate fastest lap)

Year	1	2	3	4	5	6	7	8	9	10	11	12	Pos	Pts
2019	JER1; 7	JER2; 4	MUG; 6	ASS1; 8	ASS2; 5	SAC1; 8	SAC2; 5	RBR1; 7	RBR2; 8	MIS; 7	ARA1; Ret	ARA2; 10	8th	102

=== FIM CEV Moto3 Junior World Championship ===
==== Races by year ====
(key) (Races in bold indicate pole position, races in italics indicate fastest lap)

Year	Bike	1	2	3	4	5	6	7	8	9	10	11	12	Pos	Pts
2017	KTM	ALB; 25	LMS; Ret	CAT1; 25	CAT2; 16	VAL1; 19	VAL2; 20	EST; 16	JER1; 22	JER1; 12	ARA; Ret	VAL1; Ret	VAL2; 12	30th	8
2018	KTM	EST; 7	VAL1; Ret	VAL2; DNS	FRA	CAT1	CAT2	ARA	JER1	JER2	ALB; 17	VAL1; 22	VAL2; Ret	29th	9
2019	KTM	EST; 9	VAL1; 10	VAL2; Ret	FRA; 12	CAT1; 18	CAT2; 19	ARA; Ret	JER1; Ret	JER2; 16	ALB; 13	VAL1; 22	VAL2; 15	21st	21

=== Grand Prix motorcycle racing ===
==== By season ====
Season	Class	Motorcycle	Team	Race	Win	Podium	Pole	FLap	Pts	Plcd
2020	Moto3	KTM	CarXpert Prüstel GP	15	0	0	0	0	0	28th
2021	Moto3	KTM	CarXpert Prüstel GP	5	0	0	0	0	27	24th
Total				**20**	**0**	**0**	**0**	**0**	**27**	

==== By class ====
Class	Seasons	1st GP	Race	Win	Podiums	Pole	FLap	Pts	WChmp
Moto3	2020–2021	2020 Qatar	20	0	0	0	0	27	0
Total	2020–2021		**20**	**0**	**0**	**0**	**0**	**27**	**0**

==== Races by year ====
(key) (Races in bold indicate pole position, races in italics indicate fastest lap)

Year	Class	Bike	1	2	3	4	5	6	7	8	9	10	11	12	13	14	15	16	17	18	Pos	Pts
2020	Moto3	KTM	QAT; 25	SPA; 21	ANC; 19	CZE; 23	AUT; 28	STY; 19	RSM; 19	EMI; 23	CAT; 22	FRA; 17	ARA; 22	TER; 24	EUR; 18	VAL; 22	POR; 23				28th	0
2021	Moto3	KTM	QAT; 10	DOH; 11	POR; 12	SPA; 7	FRA; 13	ITA; DNS	CAT	GER	NED	STY	AUT	GBR	ARA	RSM	AME	EMI	ALR	VAL	24th	27

== See also ==
- Rider deaths in motorcycle racing
