= 2017 FIM CEV Moto3 Junior World Championship =

2017 FIM CEV Moto3 Junior World Championship
Previous:	2016	Next:	2018
Support series: FIM CEV Moto2 European Championship; European Talent Cup

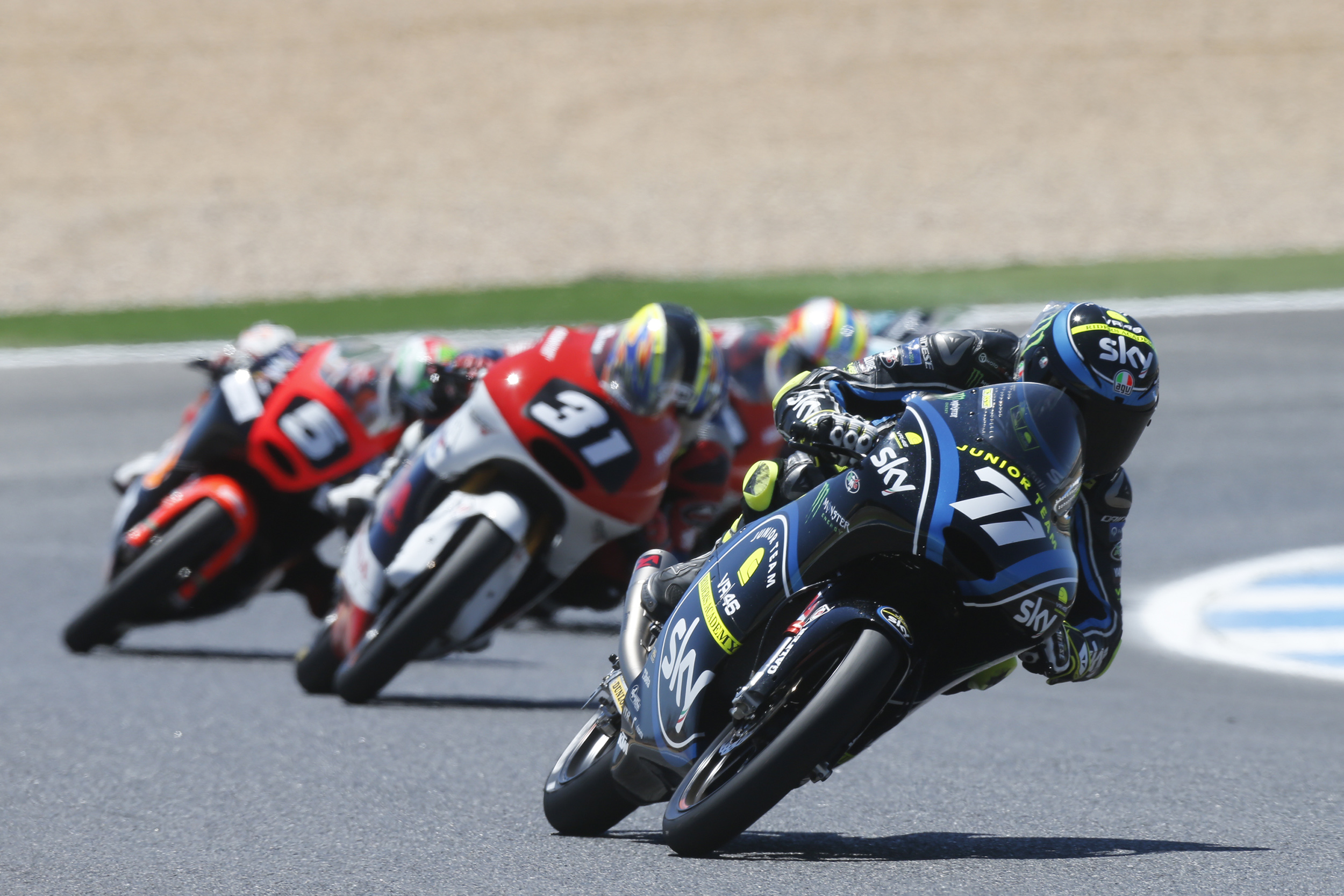
2017 champion Dennis Foggia

The 2017 FIM CEV Moto3 Junior World Championship was the sixth CEV Moto3 season and the fourth under the FIM banner.

== Calendar ==
The following races were scheduled to take place in 2017.

Round	Date	Circuit	Pole position	Fastest lap	Race winner	Winning constructor
1	30 April	(Spain) Albacete	(Thailand) Somkiat Chantra	(Italy) Dennis Foggia	(Spain) Jeremy Alcoba	(Japan) Honda
2	20 May	(France) Le Mans	(Kazakhstan) Makar Yurchenko	(Spain) Jaume Masiá	(Spain) Alonso López	(Japan) Honda
3	18 June	(Spain) Catalunya	(Japan) Kazuki Masaki	(Spain) Jaume Masiá	(Spain) Alonso López	(Japan) Honda
3	18 June	(Spain) Catalunya	(Japan) Kazuki Masaki	(Spain) Jaume Masiá	(Spain) Sergio García	(Japan) Honda
4	9 July	(Spain) Valencia	(Spain) Vicente Pérez	(Italy) Dennis Foggia	(Italy) Dennis Foggia	(Austria) KTM
4	9 July	(Spain) Valencia	(Spain) Vicente Pérez	(Japan) Yuki Kunii	(Italy) Dennis Foggia	(Austria) KTM
5	23 July	(Portugal) Estoril	(Spain) Raúl Fernández	(Japan) Kazuki Masaki	(Italy) Dennis Foggia	(Austria) KTM
6	17 September	(Spain) Jerez	(Spain) Alonso López	(Japan) Kazuki Masaki	(Spain) Alonso López	(Japan) Honda
6	17 September	(Spain) Jerez	(Spain) Alonso López	(Spain) Jaume Masiá	(Japan) Ai Ogura	(Japan) Honda
7	8 October	(Spain) Aragón	(Italy) Dennis Foggia	(Spain) Jaume Masiá	(Spain) Jaume Masiá	(Austria) KTM
8	19 November	(Spain) Valencia	(Spain) Jaume Masiá	(Spain) Sergio García	(Spain) Jaume Masiá	(Austria) KTM
8	19 November	(Spain) Valencia	(Spain) Jaume Masiá	(Spain) Jaume Masiá	(Italy) Dennis Foggia	(Austria) KTM

== Entry list ==
Team	Bike	No.	Rider	Rounds
Promoracing	KTM	2	(China) Heng Su	1–5
Promoracing	KTM	24	(Australia) Chandler Cooper	All
Promoracing	KTM	96	(United States) Brandon Paasch	7
Promoracing	Kalex	65	(United Kingdom) Josh Owens	1–7
(Germany) Dynavolt Intact GP Junior Team	KTM	4	(Germany) Matthias Meggle	1, 3–6
(Spain) Cuna de Campeones	KTM	5	(Spain) Jaume Masiá	All
(Spain) Cuna de Campeones	Mir Racing	84	(Spain) Iván Miralles	1, 3–4, 6–8
(Spain) Cuna de Campeones	Mir Racing	99	(Spain) Ángel Lorente	All
(Germany) Kiefer Racing (Germany) Kiefer	KTM	6	(Germany) Dirk Geiger	7–8
(Germany) Kiefer Racing (Germany) Kiefer	KTM	7	(Germany) Tim Georgi	7–8
(Germany) Kiefer Racing (Germany) Kiefer	KTM	91	(Belgium) Sasha De Vits	8
(Italy) 3570 MTA	Mahindra	7	(Italy) Nicola Carraro	4
(Italy) 3570 MTA	Mahindra	10	(Italy) Nicola Carraro	8
(Italy) 3570 MTA	Mahindra	49	(Italy) Edoardo Sintoni	4
(Italy) 3570 MTA	Mahindra	60	(Italy) Gianluca Sconza	4, 8
(Mexico) MotoMex Team Moto3	KTM	8	(Mexico) Gabriel Martínez-Ábrego	1–7
(Malaysia) Petronas Sprinta Racing	Honda	9	(Malaysia) Kasma Daniel	1–7
(United Kingdom) Racing Steps Foundation/KRP	KTM	11	(United Kingdom) Daniel Jones	1–5, 7–8
(United Kingdom) Racing Steps Foundation/KRP	KTM	69	(United Kingdom) Rory Skinner	1–4, 6–8
(Czech Republic) Montáže Brož Racing Team	KTM	12	(Czech Republic) Filip Salač	1–3, 6–8
(Italy) Junior Team VR46 Riders Academy (Italy) VR46 Mastercamp Team	KTM	13	(Italy) Celestino Vietti	All
(Italy) Junior Team VR46 Riders Academy (Italy) VR46 Mastercamp Team	KTM	22	(Thailand) Apiwat Wongthananon	1–3, 6–8
(Italy) Junior Team VR46 Riders Academy (Italy) VR46 Mastercamp Team	KTM	71	(Italy) Dennis Foggia	All
(Spain) Junior Team Estrella Galicia 0,0	Honda	14	(Spain) Sergio García	All
(Spain) Junior Team Estrella Galicia 0,0	Honda	21	(Spain) Alonso López	All
(Spain) Junior Team Estrella Galicia 0,0	Honda	52	(Spain) Jeremy Alcoba	All
(Spain) Junior Team Estrella Galicia 0,0	Honda	86	(United Kingdom) Charlie Nesbitt	1–2, 4–8
TMR Competición; TMR La Bruixa d'Or	KTM	15	(Italy) Matteo Ghidini	1–4
TMR Competición; TMR La Bruixa d'Or	KTM	54	(Spain) Guillem Erill	8
(Spain) MRW Mahindra Aspar Team	Mahindra	16	(Spain) Álex Ruiz	All
(Spain) MRW Mahindra Aspar Team	Mahindra	23	(Spain) Raúl Fernández	All
JHK T-Shirt	Husqvarna	17	(Italy) Riccardo Rossi	All
JHK T-Shirt	Husqvarna	48	(Italy) Andrea Cavaliere	All
JHK T-Shirt	Husqvarna	77	(Italy) Lorenzo Petrarca	All
(Netherlands) Lagemaat Racing	KTM	18	(Netherlands) Ryan van de Lagemaat	All
(Spain) Mahindra Laglisse Team	Mahindra	19	(Spain) Rufino Florido	All
(Spain) Mahindra Laglisse Team	Mahindra	67	(Spain) Gerard Riu	All
(Spain) FAU55 Racing	KTM	20	(Spain) José Julián García	1–5, 8
(Switzerland) CarXpert Interwetten Junior Moto3	KTM	25	(France) Andy Verdoïa	1–5
(Switzerland) CarXpert Interwetten Junior Moto3	KTM	50	(Switzerland) Jason Dupasquier	All
(Italy) SIC58 Squadra Corse	Honda	27	(Italy) Mattia Casadei	All
(Italy) SIC58 Squadra Corse	Honda	55	(Italy) Yari Montella	All
(Netherlands) Dutch Racing Team	Honda	28	(Netherlands) Loran Faber	All
(Spain) Larresport	Mahindra	29	(France) Lyvann Luchel	1–3, 5–6
CIP	Mahindra	29	(France) Lyvann Luchel	8
British Talent Team	Honda	30	(United Kingdom) Tom Booth-Amos	8
(Japan) Asia Talent Team	Honda	31	(Japan) Kazuki Masaki	All
(Japan) Asia Talent Team	Honda	32	(Japan) Ai Ogura	1–3, 5–8
(Japan) Asia Talent Team	Honda	33	(Japan) Yuki Kunii	1–5, 7–8
(Indonesia) Astra Honda Racing Team	Honda	34	(Indonesia) Andi Farid Izdihar	All
(Thailand) AP Honda Racing Team	Honda	35	(Thailand) Somkiat Chantra	1–2, 6–8
(Germany) Leopard Junior Team (Germany) Leopard Racing	Honda	36	(Spain) Óscar Gutiérrez	8
(Germany) Leopard Junior Team (Germany) Leopard Racing	Honda	47	(Spain) Aarón Polanco	All
(Germany) Leopard Junior Team (Germany) Leopard Racing	Honda	82	(Italy) Stefano Nepa	1–5
(Germany) Leopard Junior Team (Germany) Leopard Racing	KTM	73	(Italy) Davide Pizzoli	6
(Italy) Max Racing Team (Italy) Max Racing Team Mahindra	Mahindra	41	(Spain) Marc García	8
(Italy) Max Racing Team (Italy) Max Racing Team Mahindra	Mahindra	64	(Italy) Alessandro Delbianco	5–6
(Italy) Max Racing Team (Italy) Max Racing Team Mahindra	Mahindra	74	(Italy) Davide Pizzoli	8
(Spain) 42Motorsport	KTM	42	(Italy) Filippo Fuligni	1–5
(Spain) 42Motorsport	KTM	81	(Spain) Aleix Viu	All
Team C - Racer	Kalex	45	(France) Clément Rougé	1–4, 6–8
(Spain) Reale Avintia Academy	KTM	63	(Spain) Vicente Pérez	All
(Spain) Reale Avintia Academy	KTM	66	(Spain) Andreas Pérez	6, 8
(Spain) Reale Avintia Academy	KTM	76	(Kazakhstan) Makar Yurchenko	1–7
Motorsport Kofler	KTM	73	(Austria) Maximilian Kofler	8
NRT Junior Team	KTM	82	(Italy) Stefano Nepa	6–8
(Italy) TM Racing Factory Team	TM	88	(Italy) Brunopalazzese Ieraci	All
(Italy) TM Racing Factory Team	TM	89	(Italy) Kevin Zannoni	8
Kymco Oral Racing Team	Kymco Oral	92	(Italy) Nicholas Spinelli	8

== Championship standings ==
Scoring system

Points are awarded to the top fifteen finishers. A rider has to finish the race to earn points.

Position	**1st**	**2nd**	**3rd**	**4th**	**5th**	**6th**	**7th**	**8th**	**9th**	**10th**	**11th**	**12th**	**13th**	**14th**	**15th**
Points	25	20	16	13	11	10	9	8	7	6	5	4	3	2	1

=== Riders' championship ===
Pos.	Rider	Bike	ALB (Spain)	LMS (France)	CAT (Spain)		VAL (Spain)		EST (Portugal)	JER (Spain)		ARA (Spain)	VAL (Spain)		Pts
1	(Italy) Dennis Foggia	KTM	4	2	8	2	1	1	1	2	Ret	**2**	2	1	221
2	(Spain) Jaume Masiá	KTM	3	Ret	2	3	6	DSQ	4	15	Ret	1	**1**	**3**	142
3	(Spain) Alonso López	Honda	Ret	1	1	Ret	2	Ret	Ret	**1**	**Ret**	9	4	2	135
4	(Spain) Vicente Pérez	KTM	10	6	6	6	**4**	**3**	Ret	5	2	7	3	Ret	121
5	(Spain) Jeremy Alcoba	Honda	1	3	7	Ret	3	2	Ret	6	Ret	6	Ret	4	119
6	(Japan) Kazuki Masaki	Honda	Ret	24	4	4	5	6	2	3	Ret	3	6	27	109
7	(Spain) Sergio García	Honda	7	4	3	1	Ret	7	8	Ret	DNS	20	7	6	99
8	(Japan) Ai Ogura	Honda	Ret	5	Ret	DNS			3	12	1	8	8	5	83
9	(Spain) Aarón Polanco	Honda	12	12	Ret	12	Ret	5	Ret	4	Ret	4	5	Ret	63
10	(Kazakhstan) Makar Yurchenko	KTM	2	**13**	Ret	Ret	11	11	Ret	9	3	13			59
11	(Japan) Yuki Kunii	Honda	Ret	7	5	Ret	8	4	Ret			14	10	8	57
12	(Thailand) Apiwat Wongthananon	KTM	8	9	16	7				16	6	5	Ret	19	45
13	(United Kingdom) Rory Skinner	KTM	9	10	15	5	Ret	17		18	5	16	14	13	41
14	(Spain) José Julián García	KTM	16	23	9	Ret	20	9	6				11	9	36
15	(Spain) Aleix Viu	KTM	Ret	Ret	Ret	8	12	13	9	7	24	Ret	DNS	DNS	31
16	(Italy) Lorenzo Petrarca	Husqvarna	14	15	13	11	10	10	Ret	11	Ret	21	15	15	30
17	(Indonesia) Andi Farid Izdihar	Honda	5	DNS	Ret	27	7	14	Ret	21	15	10	Ret	Ret	29
18	(Italy) Yari Montella	Honda	Ret	Ret	10	Ret	Ret	8	5	20	14	15	Ret	DNS	28
19	(United Kingdom) Charlie Nesbitt	Honda	11	14			Ret	33	7	8	Ret	Ret	12	Ret	28
20	(Thailand) Somkiat Chantra	Honda	**Ret**	8						13	7	17	16	10	26
21	(Italy) Stefano Nepa	Honda	Ret	16	24	15	16	18	12						26
21	(Italy) Stefano Nepa	KTM								14	9	18	9	11	26
22	(Italy) Davide Pizzoli	KTM								10	4				19
22	(Italy) Davide Pizzoli	Mahindra											25	18	19
23	(Spain) Gerard Riu	Mahindra	18	18	12	12	Ret	19	Ret	24	8	22	20	23	16
24	(Italy) Brunopalazzese Ieraci	TM	6	Ret	Ret	Ret	17	16	Ret	26	Ret	11	Ret	DNS	15
25	(Italy) Celestino Vietti	KTM	DNQ	30	11	10	13	15	Ret	35	21	Ret	Ret	Ret	15
26	(Spain) Óscar Gutiérrez	Honda											13	7	12
27	(Czech Republic) Filip Salač	KTM	Ret	11	DNS	DNS				19	13	12	DNQ	DNQ	12
28	(Spain) Raúl Fernández	Mahindra	Ret	DNS	Ret	Ret	9	12	**Ret**	23	Ret	24	17	17	11
29	(Spain) Ángel Lorente	MIR	13	19	19	Ret	Ret	Ret	15	27	10	NC	Ret	20	10
30	(Switzerland) Jason Dupasquier	KTM	25	Ret	25	16	19	20	16	22	12	Ret	Ret	12	8
31	(Malaysia) Kasma Daniel	Honda	21	Ret	Ret	17	Ret	Ret	10	17	Ret	Ret			6
32	(Italy) Mattia Casadei	Honda	15	Ret	17	Ret	Ret	Ret	11	25	16	19	Ret	DNS	6
33	(United Kingdom) Daniel Jones	KTM	17	Ret	18	13	15	Ret	Ret			25	Ret	14	6
34	(Italy) Alessandro Delbianco	Mahindra							Ret	Ret	11				5
35	(France) Andy Verdoïa	KTM	22	Ret	14	14	18	24	Ret						4
36	(Netherlands) Loran Faber	Honda	DNQ	27	22	20	22	31	13	Ret	17	26	21	24	3
37	(Mexico) Gabriel Martínez-Ábrego	KTM	Ret	17	DNS	28	14	26	Ret	29	28	Ret			2
38	(Italy) Riccardo Rossi	Husqvarna	DNQ	25	23	19	Ret	22	14	30	22	31	28	26	2
	(United Kingdom) Tom Booth-Amos	Honda											29	16	0
	(Spain) Álex Ruiz	Mahindra	19	22	20	18	Ret	25	17	32	18	29	23	21	0
	(United Kingdom) Josh Owens	Kalex	Ret	20	Ret	Ret	25	32	18	33	20	27			0
	(Spain) Marc García	Mahindra											18	NC	0
	(Spain) Rufino Florido	Mahindra	DNS	21	Ret	Ret	24	27	19	28	19	30	DNQ	DNQ	0
	(Italy) Kevin Zannoni	TM											19	28	0
	(Netherlands) Ryan van de Lagemaat	KTM	Ret	29	32	25	26	34	20	34	25	Ret	26	29	0
	(Germany) Matthias Meggle	KTM	20		27	Ret	Ret	28	Ret	Ret	26				0
	(Italy) Andrea Cavaliere	Husqvarna	DNQ	31	21	21	28	29	Ret	31	Ret	28	27	30	0
	(Italy) Edoardo Sintoni	Mahindra					21	21							0
	(France) Lyvann Luchel	Mahindra	DNQ	28	31	24			21	36	27		DNQ	DNQ	0
	(Spain) Iván Miralles	MIR	DNQ		28	23	Ret	Ret		Ret	23	32	Ret	22	0
	(Belgium) Sasha De Vits	KTM											22	25	0
	(Australia) Chandler Cooper	KTM	26	32	30	26	DNQ	DNQ	22	Ret	Ret	36	DNQ	DNQ	0
	(Italy) Filippo Fuligni	KTM	DNQ	Ret	29	22	Ret	Ret	Ret						0
	(Italy) Matteo Ghidini	KTM	23	Ret	NC	DNS	23	23							0
	(China) Heng Su	KTM	DNQ	33	DNQ	DNQ	DNQ	DNQ	23						0
	(Germany) Tim Georgi	KTM										23	Ret	DNS	0
	(France) Clément Rougé	Kalex	24	26	26	Ret	Ret	DNS		Ret	Ret	33	DNQ	DNQ	0
	(Austria) Maximilian Kofler	KTM											24	Ret	0
	(Italy) Gianluca Sconza	Mahindra					27	35					DNQ	DNQ	0
	(Italy) Nicola Carraro	Mahindra					Ret	30					Ret	DNS	0
	(Germany) Dirk Geiger	KTM										34	DNQ	DNQ	0
	(United States) Brandon Paasch	KTM										35			0
	(Spain) Andreas Pérez	KTM								Ret	DNS		Ret	DNS	0
	(Italy) Nicholas Spinelli	Kymco Oral											DNQ	DNQ	0
	(Spain) Guillem Erill	KTM											DNQ	DNQ	0
Pos.	Rider	Bike	ALB (Spain)	LMS (France)	CAT (Spain)		VAL (Spain)		EST (Portugal)	JER (Spain)		ARA (Spain)	VAL (Spain)		Pts

Colour	Result
Gold	Winner
Silver	Second place
Bronze	Third place
Green	Points classification
Blue	Non-points classification
Blue	Non-classified finish (NC)
Purple	Retired, not classified (Ret)
Red	Did not qualify (DNQ)
Red	Did not pre-qualify (DNPQ)
Black	Disqualified (DSQ)
White	Did not start (DNS)
White	Withdrew (WD)
White	Race cancelled (C)
Blank	Did not practice (DNP)
Blank	Did not arrive (DNA)
Blank	Excluded (EX)

**Bold** – Pole position
Italics – Fastest lap

=== Constructors' championship ===
Pos	Constructor	ALB (Spain)	LMS (France)	CAT (Spain)		VAL (Spain)		EST (Portugal)	JER (Spain)		ARA (Spain)	VAL (Spain)		Points
1	(Austria) KTM	2	2	2	2	1	1	1	2	2	1	1	1	270
2	(Japan) Honda	1	1	1	1	2	2	2	1	1	3	4	2	259
3	(Sweden) Husqvarna	13	15	13	11	10	9	14	11	22	21	15	15	34
4	(India) Mahindra	18	18	12	12	9	12	17	23	8	22	17	17	27
5	(Italy) TM Racing	6	Ret	Ret	Ret	17	16	Ret	26	Ret	11	19	28	15
6	(Germany) Kalex	24	20	26	Ret	25	32	18	33	20	27	DNQ	DNQ	0
