= 2018 FIM CEV Moto3 Junior World Championship =

2018 FIM CEV Moto3 Junior World Championship
| Previous: | 2017 | Next: | 2019 |
Support series: FIM CEV Moto2 European Championship; European Talent Cup

The 2018 FIM CEV Moto3 Junior World Championship was the seventh CEV Moto3 season and the fifth under the FIM banner.

The season was marred by the death of Andreas Pérez, who died after an accident at the second race of the Catalunya round.

== Calendar ==
The following races were scheduled to take place in 2018.

| Round | Date | Circuit | Pole position | Fastest lap | Race winner | Winning constructor | Sources |
|---|---|---|---|---|---|---|---|
| 1 | 25 March | (Portugal) Estoril | (Italy) Manuel Pagliani | (Switzerland) Jason Dupasquier | (Italy) Manuel Pagliani | (Japan) Honda | |
| 2 | 29 April | (Spain) Valencia | (Spain) Aleix Viu | (Spain) Sergio García | (Spain) Sergio García | (Japan) Honda | |
| 2 | 29 April | (Spain) Valencia | (Spain) Aleix Viu | (Spain) Raúl Fernández | (Spain) Raúl Fernández | (Austria) KTM | |
| 3 | 19 May | (France) Le Mans | (Spain) Aleix Viu | (Japan) Ai Ogura | (Spain) Aleix Viu | (Japan) Honda | |
| 4 | 10 June | (Spain) Catalunya | (Italy) Manuel Pagliani | (Italy) Stefano Nepa | (Spain) Sergio García | (Japan) Honda | |
| 4 | 10 June | (Spain) Catalunya | (Italy) Manuel Pagliani | (Japan) Ai Ogura | (Italy) Manuel Pagliani | (Japan) Honda | |
| 5 | 29 July | (Spain) Aragón | (Belgium) Barry Baltus | (Kazakhstan) Makar Yurchenko | (Spain) Raúl Fernández | (Austria) KTM | |
| 6 | 30 September | (Spain) Jerez | (Spain) Sergio García | (Japan) Ai Ogura | (Japan) Yuki Kunii | (Japan) Honda | |
| 6 | 30 September | (Spain) Jerez | (Spain) Sergio García | (Italy) Manuel Pagliani | (Spain) Sergio García | (Japan) Honda | |
| 7 | 14 October | (Spain) Albacete | (Spain) Raúl Fernández | (Thailand) Somkiat Chantra | (Spain) Raúl Fernández | (Austria) KTM | |
| 8 | 25 November | (Spain) Valencia | (Japan) Yuki Kunii | (Kazakhstan) Makar Yurchenko | (Japan) Ai Ogura | (Japan) Honda | |
| 8 | 25 November | (Spain) Valencia | (Japan) Yuki Kunii | (Spain) Aleix Viu | (Spain) Sergio García | (Japan) Honda | |

== Entry list ==
| Team | Bike | No. | Rider | Rounds |
|---|---|---|---|---|
| (Italy) TM Racing Factory Team 3570 MTA (Italy) 3570 MTA | TM | 3 | (Italy) Kevin Zannoni | 1-4, 6-8 |
| (Italy) TM Racing Factory Team 3570 MTA (Italy) 3570 MTA | TM | 4 | (Italy) Anthony Groppi | 1-3 |
| (Italy) TM Racing Factory Team 3570 MTA (Italy) 3570 MTA | TM | 9 | (Italy) Matteo Ripamonti | 2, 4 |
| (Italy) TM Racing Factory Team 3570 MTA (Italy) 3570 MTA | TM | 74 | (Italy) Davide Pizzoli | |
| (Italy) TM Racing Factory Team 3570 MTA (Italy) 3570 MTA | KTM | 6 | (Japan) Ryusei Yamanaka | 6-8 |
| (Italy) TM Racing Factory Team 3570 MTA (Italy) 3570 MTA | KTM | 60 | (Italy) Gianluca Sconza | 2 |
| (Spain) Cuna de Campeones (Spain) Czech Talent Team Cuna de Campeones | Mir KTM | 5 | (Spain) Álex Toledo | All |
| (Spain) Cuna de Campeones (Spain) Czech Talent Team Cuna de Campeones | KTM | 8 | (Spain) Ángel Lorente | 2-7 |
| (Spain) Cuna de Campeones (Spain) Czech Talent Team Cuna de Campeones | KTM | 12 | (Czech Republic) Filip Salač | All |
| (Spain) Cuna de Campeones (Spain) Czech Talent Team Cuna de Campeones | KTM | 15 | (Spain) Iván Miralles | 1-2, 4-8 |
| (Spain) Reale Avintia Academy | KTM | 7 | (Belgium) Barry Baltus | 3-8 |
| (Spain) Reale Avintia Academy | KTM | 29 | (Italy) Nicholas Spinelli | 8 |
| (Spain) Reale Avintia Academy | KTM | 48 | (Italy) Andrea Cavaliere | 1-4 |
| (Spain) Reale Avintia Academy | KTM | 63 | (Spain) Vicente Pérez | 1-4 |
| (Spain) Reale Avintia Academy | KTM | 66 | (Spain) Adrián Huertas | 5 |
| (Spain) Reale Avintia Academy | KTM | 77 | (Spain) Andreas Pérez | 2-4 |
| (Spain) Reale Avintia Academy | KTM | 83 | (Brazil) Meikon Kawakami | 8 |
| (Spain) Reale Avintia Academy | KTM | 99 | (Spain) Carlos Tatay | 4-8 |
| (Italy) Max Racing Team | KTM | 10 | (Italy) Nicola Carraro | |
| (Italy) Max Racing Team | KTM | 41 | (Spain) Marc García | All |
| (Italy) Max Racing Team | KTM | 74 | (Italy) Davide Pizzoli | 1-4 |
| (Italy) Max Racing Team | KTM | 76 | (Kazakhstan) Makar Yurchenko | 5 |
| (Luxembourg) Leopard Junior Team | Honda | 10 | (Italy) Nicola Carraro | |
| (Luxembourg) Leopard Junior Team | Honda | 47 | (Spain) Aarón Polanco | 1, 3, 6-8 |
| (Luxembourg) Leopard Junior Team | Honda | 74 | (Italy) Davide Pizzoli | 8 |
| (Luxembourg) Leopard Junior Team | Honda | 96 | (Italy) Manuel Pagliani | 1-7 |
| (Spain) Junior Team Estrella Galicia 0,0 | Honda | 11 | (Spain) Sergio García | 1-2, 4-8 |
| (Spain) Junior Team Estrella Galicia 0,0 | Honda | 52 | (Spain) Jeremy Alcoba | All |
| (Spain) Junior Team Estrella Galicia 0,0 | Honda | 86 | (United Kingdom) Charlie Nesbitt | 1-5 |
| (Italy) Junior Team VR46 Riders Academy (Italy) VR46 Mastercamp Team | KTM | 13 | (Italy) Celestino Vietti | 2-5, 7-8 |
| (Italy) Junior Team VR46 Riders Academy (Italy) VR46 Mastercamp Team | KTM | 24 | (Thailand) Apiwat Wongthananon | 1, 3-8 |
| (Italy) Junior Team VR46 Riders Academy (Italy) VR46 Mastercamp Team | KTM | 29 | (Spain) Daniel Valle | 2 |
| (Italy) Junior Team VR46 Riders Academy (Italy) VR46 Mastercamp Team | KTM | 38 | (Italy) Elia Bartolini | 6 |
| (Spain) Ángel Nieto Team | KTM | 16 | (Spain) Álex Ruiz | 1-5 |
| (Spain) Ángel Nieto Team | KTM | 23 | (Spain) Raúl Fernández | All |
| (Netherlands) Lagemaat Racing | KTM | 18 | (Netherlands) Ryan van de Lagemaat | All |
| (Germany) Kiefer Racing DV1 (Germany) Kiefer Racing | KTM | 19 | (Belgium) Sasha De Vits | 1-5 |
| (Germany) Kiefer Racing DV1 (Germany) Kiefer Racing | KTM | 70 | (Germany) Tim Georgi | 1-4 |
| (Germany) Kiefer Racing DV1 (Germany) Kiefer Racing | Honda | 44 | (Germany) Kevin Orgis | 1-6, 8 |
| (Germany) Kiefer Racing DV1 (Germany) Kiefer Racing | Honda | 45 | (Germany) Leon Orgis | 1-5, 8 |
| (Spain) AGR Team | KTM | 20 | (Spain) José Julián García | All |
| (Spain) AGR Team | KTM | 58 | (Spain) Iñigo Iglesias | 7-8 |
| (Spain) AGR Team | KTM | 90 | (United States) Brandon Paasch | 8 |
| (Spain) Laglisse Academy | Husqvarna | 20 | (Spain) José Julián García | All |
| (Spain) Laglisse Academy | Husqvarna | 67 | (Spain) Gerard Riu | All |
| (Spain) Laglisse Academy | Husqvarna | 71 | (Italy) Riccardo Rossi | All |
| (Spain) Laglisse Academy | Husqvarna | 76 | (Kazakhstan) Makar Yurchenko | 8 |
| (Spain) Laglisse Academy | Husqvarna | 83 | (Brazil) Meikon Kawakami | 1-5 |
| (Netherlands) STG Dutch Racing Team | Honda | 28 | (Netherlands) Loran Faber | 1-7 |
| (Japan) Astra Honda Racing Team (Japan) AP Honda Racing Team | Honda | 31 | (Indonesia) Gerry Salim | All |
| (Japan) Astra Honda Racing Team (Japan) AP Honda Racing Team | Honda | 35 | (Thailand) Somkiat Chantra | 1-7 |
| (Japan) Astra Honda Racing Team (Japan) AP Honda Racing Team | Honda | 35 | (Thailand) Tatchakorn Buasri | 8 |
| (Japan) Asia Talent Team | Honda | 32 | (Japan) Ai Ogura | All |
| (Japan) Asia Talent Team | Honda | 33 | (Japan) Yuki Kunii | All |
| (United Kingdom) British Talent Team | Honda | 34 | (United Kingdom) Tom Booth-Amos | 1-3, 5-8 |
| (Malaysia) Petronas Sprinta SIC Junior Team | Honda | 36 | (Malaysia) Izam Ikmal | 2-8 |
| (Malaysia) Petronas Sprinta SIC Junior Team | Honda | 66 | (Malaysia) Danial Syahmi | 4, 6-7 |
| (Malaysia) Petronas Sprinta SIC Junior Team | Honda | 78 | (Malaysia) Idil Fitri Bin Mahadi | 1-3, 8 |
| (Switzerland) Swiss Innovative Investors Junior | KTM | 37 | (Spain) Pedro Acosta | 4-6 |
| (Denmark) Team Jespersen | KTM | 43 | (Denmark) Simon Jespersen | 1-3, 5-8 |
| (Switzerland) Carxpert-KTM-H43 | KTM | 50 | (Switzerland) Jason Dupasquier | 1-2, 7-8 |
| (Finland) Red Bull KTM Ajo | KTM | 53 | (Turkey) Deniz Öncü | All |
| (Finland) Red Bull KTM Ajo | KTM | 61 | (Turkey) Can Öncü | All |
| (Italy) SIC58 Squadra Corse | Honda | 55 | (Italy) Yari Montella | All |
| (Italy) SIC58 Squadra Corse | Honda | 88 | (Italy) Bruno Ieraci | All |
| (United Kingdom) KRP | KTM | 73 | (Austria) Maximilian Kofler | All |
| (Italy) Marinelli Sniper Team | Honda | 81 | (Spain) Aleix Viu | All |
| (Italy) NRT Junior Team | KTM | 82 | (Italy) Stefano Nepa | 2-4, 8 |
| (Spain) FAU55 Racing - El Señor del las Bolsas (Spain) FAU55 Racing | KTM | 87 | (Spain) Fau Cañero | 6 |
| (Spain) FAU55 Racing - El Señor del las Bolsas (Spain) FAU55 Racing | KTM | 94 | (Netherlands) Finn de Bruin | 8 |

== Championship standings ==
Scoring system

Points are awarded to the top fifteen finishers. A rider has to finish the race to earn points.

| Position | **1st** | **2nd** | **3rd** | **4th** | **5th** | **6th** | **7th** | **8th** | **9th** | **10th** | **11th** | **12th** | **13th** | **14th** | **15th** |
| Points | 25 | 20 | 16 | 13 | 11 | 10 | 9 | 8 | 7 | 6 | 5 | 4 | 3 | 2 | 1 |

=== Riders' championship ===
| Pos. | Rider | Bike | EST (Portugal) | VAL (Spain) | | FRA (France) | CAT (Spain) | | ARA (Spain) | JER (Spain) | | ALB (Spain) | VAL (Spain) | | Pts |
|---|---|---|---|---|---|---|---|---|---|---|---|---|---|---|---|
| 1 | (Spain) Raúl Fernández | KTM | 2 | 4 | 1 | 2 | 8 | 4 | 1 | 2 | 5 | **1** | 3 | 4 | 209 |
| 2 | (Spain) Sergio García | Honda | Ret | 1 | DNS | | 1 | 5 | 6 | **Ret** | **1** | Ret | 5 | 1 | 132 |
| 3 | (Italy) Manuel Pagliani | Honda | **1** | 13 | 2 | 6 | **4** | **1** | Ret | 5 | 3 | 8 | | | 131 |
| 4 | (Spain) Jeremy Alcoba | Honda | Ret | 3 | 12 | 9 | 2 | 3 | 2 | 4 | Ret | 11 | 2 | 6 | 131 |
| 5 | (Japan) Ai Ogura | Honda | Ret | Ret | 3 | 3 | 7 | 23 | 4 | Ret | 2 | 7 | 1 | 2 | 128 |
| 6 | (Japan) Yuki Kunii | Honda | 4 | 5 | 4 | 5 | Ret | 9 | 11 | 1 | 4 | 3 | **Ret** | **5** | 125 |
| 7 | (Turkey) Can Öncü | KTM | 15 | 10 | 17 | 28 | 10 | 12 | 3 | 6 | 10 | 2 | 6 | 3 | 95 |
| 8 | (Spain) Aleix Viu | Honda | 12 | **2** | **Ret** | **1** | Ret | 13 | 8 | 3 | Ret | 12 | 4 | 32 | 93 |
| 9 | (Thailand) Somkiat Chantra | Honda | 9 | 6 | 5 | 4 | 12 | 14 | Ret | 12 | Ret | 6 | | | 61 |
| 10 | (Italy) Celestino Vietti | KTM | | Ret | Ret | Ret | 13 | 2 | 5 | | | 29 | 7 | 7 | 52 |
| 11 | (Czech Republic) Filip Salač | KTM | 8 | 9 | Ret | 18 | 22 | 16 | 9 | 9 | 8 | 10 | 8 | 15 | 52 |
| 12 | (Thailand) Apiwat Wongthananon | KTM | Ret | | | 12 | 3 | 8 | Ret | Ret | Ret | 4 | 12 | 11 | 50 |
| 13 | (Spain) Marc García | KTM | 5 | Ret | 11 | 20 | 6 | 6 | 14 | 13 | 12 | 13 | 18 | 14 | 50 |
| 14 | (Turkey) Deniz Öncü | KTM | 24 | Ret | 14 | 14 | 9 | Ret | 7 | 7 | 6 | 32 | 24 | 26 | 39 |
| 15 | (Italy) Riccardo Rossi | Husqvarna | 10 | 7 | 7 | 8 | Ret | 22 | Ret | Ret | 13 | 31 | 13 | 16 | 38 |
| 16 | (Spain) Vicente Pérez | KTM | 3 | Ret | 8 | 7 | Ret | 15 | | | | | | | 34 |
| 17 | (Italy) Yari Montella | Honda | 6 | 11 | 33 | 10 | 15 | 10 | 10 | Ret | Ret | 20 | Ret | Ret | 34 |
| 18 | (Japan) Ryusei Yamanaka | KTM | | | | | | | | 8 | 9 | Ret | 9 | 8 | 30 |
| 19 | (Spain) Gerard Riu | Husqvarna | Ret | 8 | 9 | Ret | 16 | DNS | Ret | 11 | 21 | 14 | 11 | 13 | 30 |
| 20 | (Italy) Bruno Ieraci | Honda | Ret | Ret | Ret | 22 | 11 | Ret | 12 | 10 | 11 | Ret | 14 | 10 | 28 |
| 21 | (Italy) Stefano Nepa | KTM | | 26 | 28 | 23 | 5 | 7 | | | | | 23 | Ret | 20 |
| 22 | (United Kingdom) Tom Booth-Amos | Honda | Ret | DNS | DNS | 40 | | | 26 | 14 | Ret | 5 | Ret | Ret | 13 |
| 23 | (Italy) Davide Pizzoli | KTM | 13 | 24 | 6 | 17 | 19 | 28 | | | | | | | 13 |
| 23 | (Italy) Davide Pizzoli | Honda | | | | | | | | | | | Ret | DNS | 13 |
| 24 | (Spain) Carlos Tatay | KTM | | | | | 14 | DNS | 20 | Ret | 7 | 16 | Ret | Ret | 11 |
| 25 | (Austria) Maximilian Kofler | KTM | 27 | 21 | 19 | 16 | 23 | 31 | 15 | Ret | 17 | 18 | 10 | 12 | 11 |
| 26 | (United Kingdom) Charlie Nesbitt | Honda | Ret | 14 | 10 | 13 | 18 | DNS | 19 | | | | | | 11 |
| 27 | (Italy) Kevin Zannoni | TM | Ret | 12 | 16 | 19 | Ret | 11 | | 15 | 15 | 34 | 28 | 22 | 11 |
| 28 | (Spain) Ángel Lorente | KTM | | Ret | 13 | 11 | Ret | 20 | Ret | 19 | 14 | 24 | | | 10 |
| 29 | (Switzerland) Jason Dupasquier | KTM | 7 | Ret | DNS | | | | | | | 17 | 22 | Ret | 9 |
| 30 | (Kazakhstan) Makar Yurchenko | KTM | | | | | | | Ret | | | | | | 7 |
| 30 | (Kazakhstan) Makar Yurchenko | Husqvarna | | | | | | | | | | | Ret | 9 | 7 |
| 31 | (Belgium) Barry Baltus | KTM | | | | Ret | 17 | 19 | **Ret** | 18 | 18 | 9 | 17 | 18 | 7 |
| 32 | (Spain) José Julián García | KTM | 11 | 15 | Ret | Ret | Ret | Ret | Ret | 20 | Ret | 23 | 19 | 19 | 6 |
| 33 | (Spain) Pedro Acosta | KTM | | | | | Ret | DNS | 13 | 27 | 19 | | | | 3 |
| 34 | (Belgium) Sasha De Vits | KTM | 14 | 18 | 20 | 30 | Ret | 17 | Ret | | | | | | 2 |
| 35 | (Indonesia) Gerry Salim | Honda | Ret | 25 | 27 | 25 | 25 | 21 | 16 | 17 | 16 | 15 | 20 | Ret | 1 |
| 36 | (Germany) Kevin Orgis | Honda | 26 | Ret | Ret | 29 | 21 | 18 | Ret | 16 | Ret | | 15 | DNS | 1 |
| 37 | (Spain) Álex Ruiz | KTM | 21 | 19 | 15 | 31 | 20 | 30 | Ret | | | | | | 1 |
| 38 | (Brazil) Meikon Kawakami | Husqvarna | Ret | 29 | 26 | 15 | 33 | 26 | Ret | | | | | | 1 |
| 38 | (Brazil) Meikon Kawakami | KTM | | | | | | | | | | | 27 | 20 | 1 |
| | (Netherlands) Loran Faber | Honda | 16 | 16 | 18 | 21 | 26 | 24 | 21 | 23 | 22 | 19 | | | 0 |
| | (Spain) Aarón Polanco | Honda | DNS | | | 36 | | | | 22 | 20 | 22 | 16 | 17 | 0 |
| | (Netherlands) Ryan van de Lagemaat | KTM | 17 | 27 | 29 | 26 | 28 | 27 | 25 | Ret | Ret | 21 | Ret | 24 | 0 |
| | (Spain) Álex Toledo | Mir KTM | 23 | 23 | 22 | 27 | 24 | DNS | 17 | 25 | 27 | 25 | 25 | 23 | 0 |
| | (Spain) Daniel Valle | KTM | | 17 | Ret | | | | | | | | | | 0 |
| | (Germany) Tim Georgi | KTM | 18 | Ret | 23 | 32 | DNQ | DNQ | | | | | | | 0 |
| | (Spain) Adrián Huertas | KTM | | | | | | | 18 | | | | | | 0 |
| | (Denmark) Simon Jespersen | KTM | 19 | Ret | 21 | 33 | | | 22 | 26 | 28 | 35 | 26 | 27 | 0 |
| | (Italy) Nicola Carraro | Honda | | 20 | 25 | | Ret | 29 | | | | | | | 0 |
| | (Italy) Nicola Carraro | KTM | | | | | | | | 21 | 24 | 33 | | | 0 |
| | (Germany) Leon Orgis | Honda | 20 | Ret | Ret | 37 | 31 | 34 | 24 | | | | 29 | 28 | 0 |
| | (Italy) Nicholas Spinelli | KTM | | | | | | | | | | | 21 | 21 | 0 |
| | (Spain) Iván Miralles | KTM | 25 | 22 | 24 | | Ret | 32 | 23 | 28 | 26 | 26 | Ret | Ret | 0 |
| | (Italy) Anthony Groppi | TM | 22 | 30 | 31 | 39 | | | | | | | | | 0 |
| | (Italy) Elia Bartolini | KTM | | | | | | | | 23 | 24 | | | | 0 |
| | (Spain) Andreas Pérez | KTM | | Ret | DNS | 24 | 29 | DNS | | | | | | | 0 |
| | (Malaysia) Izam Ikmal | Honda | | Ret | 32 | 38 | 27 | 25 | DNS | Ret | Ret | 27 | 31 | 29 | 0 |
| | (Spain) Iñigo Iglesias | KTM | | | | | | | | | | 28 | Ret | 25 | 0 |
| | (Spain) Fau Cañero | KTM | | | | | | | | Ret | 25 | | | | 0 |
| | (Italy) Andrea Cavaliere | KTM | Ret | 28 | 30 | 34 | 30 | 33 | | | | | | | 0 |
| | (Malaysia) Daniel Syahmi | Honda | | | | | 32 | 35 | | 29 | 29 | 30 | | | 0 |
| | (Malaysia) Idil Fitri Bin Mahadi | Honda | Ret | DNQ | DNQ | Ret | | | | | | | Ret | 30 | 0 |
| | (Thailand) Tatchakorn Buasri | Honda | | | | | | | | | | | 30 | Ret | 0 |
| | (Netherlands) Finn de Bruin | Honda | | | | | | | | | | | 32 | 31 | 0 |
| | (United States) Brandon Paasch | KTM | | | | | | | | | | | Ret | Ret | 0 |
| | (Italy) Matteo Ripamonti | TM | | DNQ | DNQ | | DNQ | DNQ | | | | | | | 0 |
| | (Italy) Gianluca Sconza | KTM | | DNQ | DNQ | | | | | | | | | | 0 |
| Pos. | Rider | Bike | EST (Portugal) | VAL (Spain) | | FRA (France) | CAT (Spain) | | ARA (Spain) | JER (Spain) | | ALB (Spain) | VAL (Spain) | | Pts |

| Colour | Result |
|---|---|
| Gold | Winner |
| Silver | Second place |
| Bronze | Third place |
| Green | Points classification |
| Blue | Non-points classification |
| Blue | Non-classified finish (NC) |
| Purple | Retired, not classified (Ret) |
| Red | Did not qualify (DNQ) |
| Red | Did not pre-qualify (DNPQ) |
| Black | Disqualified (DSQ) |
| White | Did not start (DNS) |
| White | Withdrew (WD) |
| White | Race cancelled (C) |
| Blank | Did not practice (DNP) |
| Blank | Did not arrive (DNA) |
| Blank | Excluded (EX) |

**Bold** – Pole position
Italics – Fastest lap

=== Constructors' championship ===
| Pos | Constructor | EST (Portugal) | VAL (Spain) | | FRA (France) | CAT (Spain) | | ARA (Spain) | JER (Spain) | | ALB (Spain) | VAL (Spain) | | Points |
|---|---|---|---|---|---|---|---|---|---|---|---|---|---|---|
| 1 | (Japan) Honda | 1 | 1 | 2 | 1 | 1 | 1 | 2 | 1 | 1 | 3 | 1 | 1 | 281 |
| 2 | (Austria) KTM | 2 | 4 | 1 | 2 | 3 | 2 | 1 | 2 | 5 | 1 | 3 | 3 | 227 |
| 3 | (Sweden) Husqvarna | 10 | 7 | 7 | 8 | 16 | 22 | Ret | 11 | 13 | 14 | 11 | 9 | 54 |
| 4 | (Italy) TM Racing | Ret | 12 | 16 | 19 | Ret | 11 | | 15 | 15 | 34 | 28 | 22 | 11 |
