= Maximilian Kofler =

Austrian motorcycle racer (born 2000)

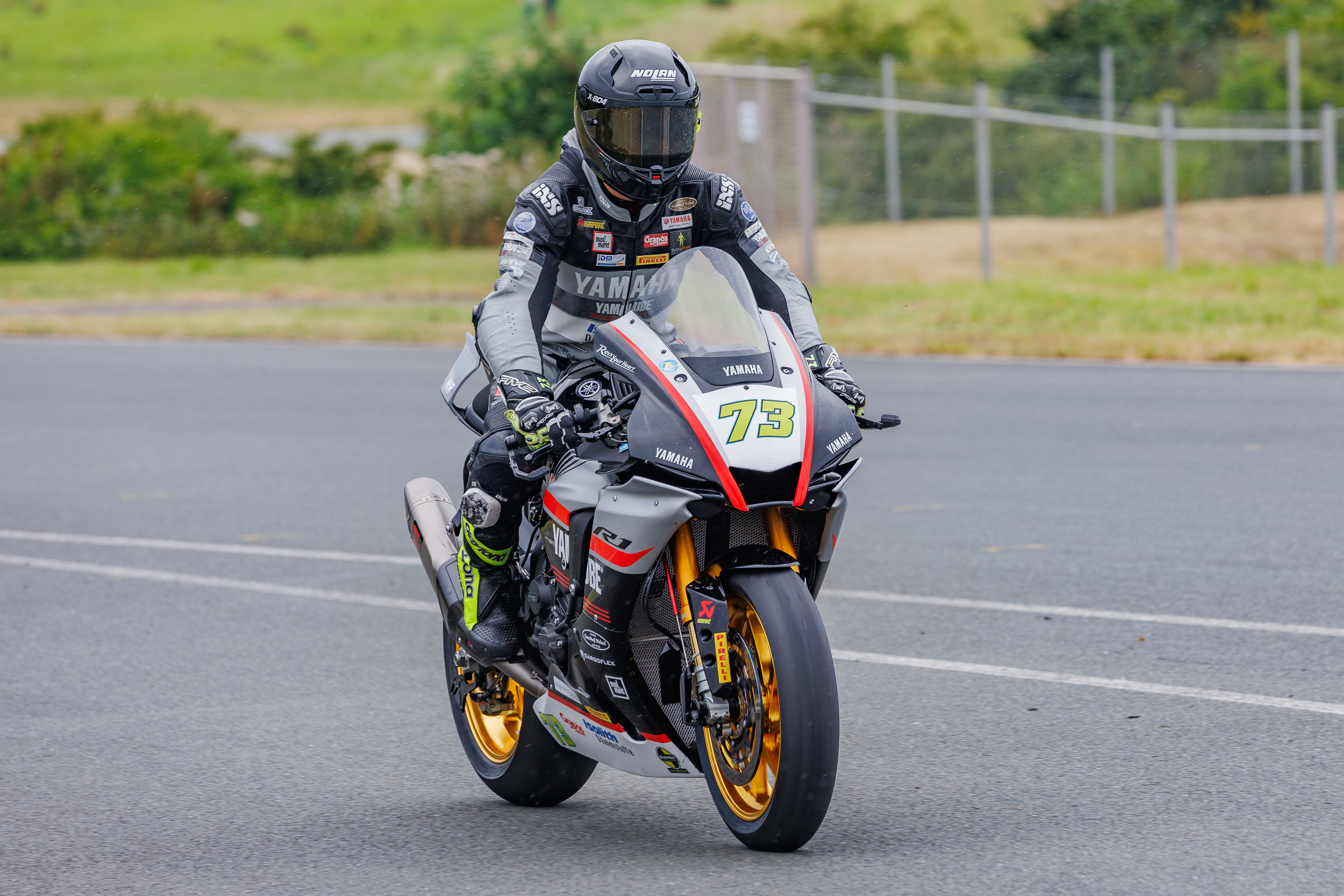
- 2024 at IDM Schleiz
- Nationality: Austrian
- Born: 18 August 2000 (age 26); Vöcklabruck, Austria
- Current team: CM Racing Ducati
- Bike number: 73
Motorcycle racing career statistics
Moto3 World Championship
Active years	2017–2021
Manufacturers	KTM
Championships	0
2021 championship position	26th (10 pts)
Starts / Wins / Podiums / Poles / F. laps / Points; 32 / 0 / 0 / 0 / 0 / 10
Supersport World Championship
Active years	2022–
Manufacturers	Ducati
Championships	0
2023 championship position	36th (4 pts)
Starts / Wins / Podiums / Poles / F. laps / Points; 36 / 0 / 0 / 0 / 0 / 6

Maximilian Kofler (born 18 August 2000) is an Austrian motorcycle rider, contracted to compete in the 2022 Supersport World Championship with CM Racing Ducati.

== Career ==
=== Junior career ===
Kofler started racing bikes at the age of seven and competed in MiniMoto and SuperMoto bikes from 2007 until 2016, winning both Austrian and German championships.

In 2017, Kofler competed in the Italian Moto3 Championship and finished the season eighth in the standings. He graduated to the Moto3 Junior World Championships, where he competed full-time in 2018 and 2019 with limited success, finishing 25th and 17th respectively.

=== Moto3 World Championship ===
==== 2017 ====
Kofler made his debut Grand Prix wild-card appearance during his home round at the Red Bull Ring in 2017, finishing the race in 23rd.

==== 2018 ====
Kofler once again made a one-off appearance in the 2018 season's Austrian GP round, this time finishing in 29th.

==== 2019 ====
Kofler would race in two Grand Prixs in the 2019 season, finishing 20th in Austria, and 28th in Great Britain.

==== 2020 ====
Kofler became a full-time Moto3 Grand Prix rider in 2020, signed by the CIP Green Power team to partner Darryn Binder. Although Kofler did not score a single point during the year, he was retained by the CIP Green Power team for the 2021 season.

==== 2021 ====
The 2021 Moto3 World Championship saw improvements from Kofler, finishing 15th and 14th in the first two races of the year in Doha, Qatar, before a serious accident in Mugello fractured four vertebrae in his chest, causing him to miss an extended time of the season. He returned with a ninth place in Austria, but that was his last point scoring finish of the season, ending the year with only ten points, 26th in the standings. Kofler was not given a new contract for 2022 by Moto3 teams.

=== Supersport World Championship ===
==== 2022 ====
In 2022, Kofler joined the 2022 Supersport World Championship with CM Racing, riding on the Ducati Panigale V2.

== Career statistics ==
=== FIM CEV Moto3 Junior World Championship ===
==== Races by year ====
(key) (Races in bold indicate pole position, races in italics indicate fastest lap)

Year	Bike	1	2	3	4	5	6	7	8	9	10	11	12	Pos	Pts
2017	KTM	ALB	LMS	CAT1	CAT2	VAL1	VAL2	EST	JER1	JER1	ARA	VAL1; 24	VAL2; Ret	NC	0
2018	KTM	EST	VAL1	VAL2	FRA	CAT1; 14	CAT2; DNS	ARA; 20	JER1; Ret	JER2; 7	ALB; 16	VAL1; Ret	VAL2; Ret	25th	11
2019	KTM	EST; 12	VAL1; Ret	VAL2; Ret	FRA; 11	CAT1; 7	CAT2; 10	ARA; 13	JER1; 19	JER2; 15	ALB; Ret	VAL1; 19	VAL2; 10	17th	34

=== Grand Prix motorcycle racing ===
==== By season ====
Season	Class	Motorcycle	Team	Race	Win	Podium	Pole	FLap	Pts	Plcd
2017	Moto3	KTM	Motorsport Kofler E.U.	1	0	0	0	0	0	41st
2018	Moto3	KTM	Motorsport Kofler	1	0	0	0	0	0	46th
2019	Moto3	KTM	Sama Qatar Angel Nieto Team	2	0	0	0	0	0	43rd
2020	Moto3	KTM	CIP Green Power	15	0	0	0	0	0	30th
2021	Moto3	KTM	CIP Green Power	13	0	0	0	0	10	26th
Total				**32**	**0**	**0**	**0**	**0**	**10**	

==== By class ====
Class	Seasons	1st GP	1st Pod	1st Win	Race	Win	Podiums	Pole	FLap	Pts	WChmp
Moto3	2017–2021	2017 Austria			32	0	0	0	0	10	0
Total	2017–2021				**32**	**0**	**0**	**0**	**0**	**10**	**0**

==== Races by year ====
(key) (Races in bold indicate pole position; races in italics indicate fastest lap)

Year	Class	Bike	1	2	3	4	5	6	7	8	9	10	11	12	13	14	15	16	17	18	19	Pos	Pts
2017	Moto3	KTM	QAT	ARG	AME	SPA	FRA	ITA	CAT	NED	GER	CZE	AUT; 23	GBR	RSM	ARA	JPN	AUS	MAL	VAL		41st	0
2018	Moto3	KTM	QAT	ARG	AME	SPA	FRA	ITA	CAT	NED	GER	CZE	AUT; 29	GBR	RSM	ARA	THA	JPN	AUS	MAL	VAL	46th	0
2019	Moto3	KTM	QAT	ARG	AME	SPA	FRA	ITA	CAT	NED	GER	CZE	AUT; 20	GBR; 28	RSM	ARA	THA	JPN	AUS	MAL	VAL	43rd	0
2020	Moto3	KTM	QAT; 27	SPA; 20	ANC; 18	CZE; Ret	AUT; 25	STY; 24	RSM; 22	EMI; 27	CAT; 23	FRA; 21	ARA; Ret	TER; 28	EUR; 21	VAL; Ret	POR; 25					30th	0
2021	Moto3	KTM	QAT; 15	DOH; 14	POR; 21	SPA; 19	FRA; 16	ITA; Ret	CAT	GER	NED	STY; 9	AUT; 22	GBR; 25	ARA; 19	RSM; 22	AME; 17	EMI; 18	ALR	VAL		26th	10

=== Supersport World Championship ===
==== Races by year ====
(key) (Races in bold indicate pole position, races in italics indicate fastest lap)

Year	Bike	1	2	3	4	5	6	7	8	9	10	11	12	13	14	15	16	17	18	19	20	21	22	23	24	Pos	Pts
2022	Ducati	SPA; 22	SPA; Ret	NED; 20	NED; 19	POR; Ret	POR; 16	ITA; 16	ITA; 17	GBR; 19	GBR; Ret	CZE; 17	CZE; Ret	FRA; 24	FRA; 18	SPA; 29	SPA; 25	POR; 23	POR; 14	ARG	ARG	INA	INA	AUS	AUS	34th	2
2023	Ducati	AUS	AUS	INA	INA	NED; 18	NED; 19	SPA; NC	SPA; 24	MIS; 18	MIS; Ret	GBR; 23	GBR; 22	ITA; 17	ITA; 12	CZE; 18	CZE; 20	FRA; 26	FRA; Ret	SPA; 21	SPA; 20	POR; 19	POR; 22	JER	JER	NC	0

* Season still in progress.

=== FIM Endurance World Cup ===
Year	Team	Bike	Tyre	Rider	Pts	TC
2025	(France) Pitlane Endurance #86	Yamaha YZF-R1	**D**	(Belgium) Luca de Vleeschauwer (Austria) Maximilian Kofler (Finland) Kenny Koskinen (France) Samuel Biron	14*	21st*
