= Davide Pizzoli =

Italian motorcycle racer

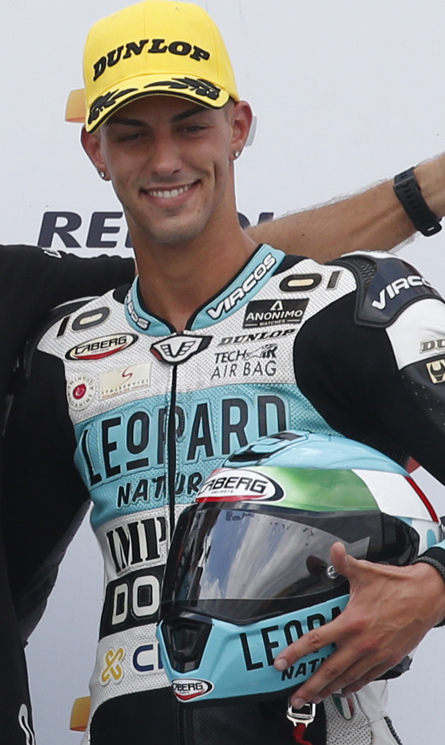
- Pizzoli in 2019
- Nationality: Italian
- Born: 11 September 1999 (age 27); Rome, Italy
- Current team: VFT Racing
- Bike number: 23
Motorcycle racing career statistics
Moto3 World Championship
Active years	2015–2016, 2019–2020
Manufacturers	Husqvarna, KTM, Honda
Championships	0
2020 championship position	29th (0 pts)
Starts / Wins / Podiums / Poles / F. laps / Points; 20 / 0 / 0 / 0 / 0 / 0
Supersport World Championship
Active years	2017, 2021
Manufacturers	MV Agusta, Yamaha
Championships	0
2021 championship position	50th (1 pt)
Starts / Wins / Podiums / Poles / F. laps / Points; 10 / 0 / 0 / 0 / 0 / 3

Davide Pizzoli (born 11 September 1999) is an Italian motorcycle racer. He has competed in the FIM CEV Moto3 Junior World Championship, the Moto3 World Championship and the Supersport World Championship. Pizzolli finished in 50th place on the final standings at 2021 Supersport World Championship.

== Career statistics ==
=== Career highlights ===
- 2021 : Yamaha - VFR Racing (CIV Supersport 600) #23

=== FIM CEV Moto3 Junior World Championship ===
==== Races by year ====
(key) (Races in bold indicate pole position, races in italics indicate fastest lap)

Year	Bike	1	2	3	4	5	6	7	8	9	10	11	12	Pos	Pts
2014	KTM	JER1; 29	JER2; 34	LMS; DNS	ARA	CAT1; 24	CAT2; Ret	ALB; 26	NAV; 26	ALG; 11	VAL1; Ret	VAL2; 22		29th	5
2015	Husqvarna	ALG; 20	LMS; 13	CAT1; 8	CAT2; 19	ARA1; 13	ARA2; 4	ALB; 15	NAV; 5	JER1; Ret	JER2; Ret	VAL1; DNS	VAL2; DNS	13th	39
2016	KTM	VAL1; Ret	VAL2; 13	LMS	ARA; 20	CAT1; 13	CAT2; Ret	ALB	ALG	JER1	JER2	VAL1	VAL2	27th	9
2016	Husqvarna	VAL1	VAL2	LMS	ARA	CAT1	CAT2	ALB; 16	ALG; 13	JER1; 19	JER2; 22	VAL1	VAL2	27th	9
2017	KTM	ALB	LMS	CAT1	CAT2	VAL1	VAL2	EST	JER1; 10	JER1; 4	ARA	VAL1	VAL2	22nd	19
2017	Mahindra	ALB	LMS	CAT1	CAT2	VAL1	VAL2	EST	JER1	JER1	ARA	VAL1; 25	VAL2; 18	22nd	19
2018	KTM	EST; 13	VAL1; 24	VAL2; 6	FRA; 17	CAT1; 19	CAT2; 28	ARA	JER1	JER2	ALB	VAL1	VAL2	23rd	13
2018	Honda	EST	VAL1	VAL2	FRA	CAT1	CAT2	ARA	JER1	JER2	ALB	VAL1; Ret	VAL2; DNS	23rd	13
2019	Honda	EST; Ret	VAL1; 3	VAL2; 8	FRA; Ret	CAT1; 12	CAT2; Ret	ARA; 3	JER1; 15	JER2; 10	ALB; 12	**VAL1**; 12	**VAL2**; Ret	10th	59

=== Grand Prix motorcycle racing ===
==== By season ====
Season	Class	Motorcycle	Team	Race	Win	Podium	Pole	FLap	Pts	Plcd
2015	Moto3	Husqvarna	Husqvarna Factory Laglisse	1	0	0	0	0	0	NC
2016	Moto3	KTM	Procercasa – 42 Motorsport	2	0	0	0	0	0	42nd
2019	Moto3	Honda	SIC58 Squadra Corse	1	0	0	0	0	0	36th
2019	Moto3	KTM	Mugen Race	1	0	0	0	0	0	36th
2020	Moto3	KTM	BOE Skull Rider Facile Energy	15	0	0	0	0	0	29th
Total				**20**	**0**	**0**	**0**	**0**	**0**	

==== By class ====
Class	Seasons	1st GP	1st Pod	1st Win	Race	Win	Podiums	Pole	FLap	Pts	WChmp
Moto3	2015–2016, 2019–2020	2015 Aragon			20	0	0	0	0	0	0
Total	2015–2016, 2019–2020				**20**	**0**	**0**	**0**	**0**	**0**	**0**

==== Races by year ====
(key) (Races in bold indicate pole position; races in italics indicate fastest lap)

Year	Class	Bike	1	2	3	4	5	6	7	8	9	10	11	12	13	14	15	16	17	18	19	Pos	Pts
2015	Moto3	Husqvarna	QAT	AME	ARG	SPA	FRA	ITA	CAT	NED	GER	INP	CZE	GBR	RSM	ARA; 26	JPN	AUS	MAL	VAL		NC	0
2016	Moto3	KTM	QAT	ARG	AME	SPA; 20	FRA; WD	ITA; DNS	CAT; Ret	NED	GER	AUT	CZE	GBR	RSM	ARA	JPN	AUS	MAL	VAL		42nd	0
2019	Moto3	Honda	QAT	ARG	AME	SPA	FRA	ITA	CAT	NED	GER	CZE	AUT	GBR	RSM	ARA; 22						36th	0
2019	Moto3	KTM															THA; 16	JPN	AUS	MAL	VAL	36th	0
2020	Moto3	KTM	QAT; 23	SPA; 23	ANC; Ret	CZE; 24	AUT; 27	STY; 23	RSM; 18	EMI; 26	CAT; Ret	FRA; Ret	ARA; 26	TER; 26	EUR; 19	VAL; 20	POR; 26					29th	0

=== Supersport World Championship ===
==== Races by year ====
(key) (Races in bold indicate pole position; races in italics indicate fastest lap)

Year	Bike	1	2	3	4	5	6	7	8	9	10	11	12	13	14	15	16	17	18	19	20	21	22	23	24	Pos	Pts
2017	MV Agusta	AUS; Ret	THA; 14	SPA; DNS	NED; Ret	ITA; Ret	GBR	ITA	GER	POR	FRA	SPA	QAT													37th	2
2021	Yamaha	SPA; Ret	SPA; Ret	POR; 15	POR; 17	ITA; Ret	ITA; 18	NED	NED	CZE	CZE	SPA	SPA	FRA	FRA	SPA	SPA	SPA	SPA	POR	POR	ARG	ARG	INA	INA	50th	1
