= Tim Georgi =

German motorcycle racer

- Nationality: German
- Born: 16 May 2000 (age 26); Berlin, Germany
- Website: timracing.de
Motorcycle racing career statistics
Moto3 World Championship
| Active years | 2016–2017 |
| Manufacturers | KTM |
| 2017 championship position | 36th (0 pts) |
Starts / Wins / Podiums / Poles / F. laps / Points; 3 / 0 / 0 / 0 / 0 / 0
Supersport 300 World Championship
| Active years | 2017 |
| Manufacturers | Kawasaki |
| Championships | 0 |
| 2017 championship position | 23rd (7 pts) |
Starts / Wins / Podiums / Poles / F. laps / Points; 1 / 0 / 0 / 0 / 0 / 7

Tim Georgi (born 16 May 2000) is a German motorcycle racer. He competes in the FIM CEV Moto3 Junior World Championship aboard a KTM RC250GP. He was the ADAC KTM Junior Cup champion in 2014, the IDM Moto3 Standard champion in 2015 and the ADAC Northern Europe Cup GP champion in 2017. He made his Grand Prix debut in the Moto3 class as a wild-card rider in the 2016 German Grand Prix.

== Career statistics ==
=== FIM CEV Moto3 Junior World Championship ===
==== Races by year ====
(key) (Races in bold indicate pole position, races in italics indicate fastest lap)

| Year | Bike | 1 | 2 | 3 | 4 | 5 | 6 | 7 | 8 | 9 | 10 | 11 | 12 | Pos | Pts |
|---|---|---|---|---|---|---|---|---|---|---|---|---|---|---|---|
| 2016 | KTM | VAL1; 18 | VAL2; 19 | LMS | ARA; 26 | CAT1; 23 | CAT2; 24 | ALB; 21 | ALG; Ret | JER1; 28 | JER2; 26 | VAL1; 17 | VAL2; Ret | NC | 0 |
| 2017 | KTM | ALB | LMS | CAT1 | CAT2 | VAL1 | VAL2 | EST | JER1 | JER1 | ARA; 23 | VAL1; Ret | VAL2; DNS | NC | 0 |
| 2018 | KTM | EST; 18 | VAL1; Ret | VAL2; 23 | FRA; 32 | CAT1; DNQ | CAT2; DNQ | ARA | JER1 | JER2 | ALB | VAL1 | VAL2 | NC | 0 |

=== Grand Prix motorcycle racing ===
==== By season ====
| Season | Class | Motorcycle | Team | Race | Win | Podium | Pole | FLap | Pts | Plcd |
|---|---|---|---|---|---|---|---|---|---|---|
| 2016 | Moto3 | KTM | Freudenberg Racing Team | 1 | 0 | 0 | 0 | 0 | 0 | NC |
| 2017 | Moto3 | KTM | Freudenberg Racing Team | 2 | 0 | 0 | 0 | 0 | 0 | 36th |
| Total | | | | **3** | **0** | **0** | **0** | **0** | **0** | |

==== Races by year ====
| Year | Class | Bike | 1 | 2 | 3 | 4 | 5 | 6 | 7 | 8 | 9 | 10 | 11 | 12 | 13 | 14 | 15 | 16 | 17 | 18 | Pos. | Pts |
|---|---|---|---|---|---|---|---|---|---|---|---|---|---|---|---|---|---|---|---|---|---|---|
| 2016 | Moto3 | KTM | QAT | ARG | AME | SPA | FRA | ITA | CAT | NED | GER; 21 | AUT | CZE | GBR | RSM | ARA | JPN | AUS | MAL | VAL | NC | 0 |
| 2017 | Moto3 | KTM | QAT | ARG | AME | SPA | FRA | ITA | CAT | NED | GER; 24 | CZE; 18 | AUT | GBR | RSM | ARA | JPN | AUS | MAL | VAL | 36th | 0 |

=== Supersport 300 World Championship ===
==== Races by year ====
(key) (Races in bold indicate pole position; races in italics indicate fastest lap)

| Year | Bike | 1 | 2 | 3 | 4 | 5 | 6 | 7 | 8 | 9 | Pos | Pts |
|---|---|---|---|---|---|---|---|---|---|---|---|---|
| 2017 | Yamaha | ARA | ASS | IMO | DON | MIS | LAU; 7 | POR | MAG | JER | 23rd | 9 |
