= 2020 Catalan motorcycle Grand Prix =

(Catalonia) 2020 Catalan Grand Prix
Race details
- Race 9 of 15 races in the 2020 Grand Prix motorcycle racing season
- Date: 27 September 2020
- Official name: Gran Premi Monster Energy de Catalunya
- Location: Circuit de Barcelona-Catalunya; Montmeló, Spain
- Course: Permanent racing facility; 4.627 km (2.875 mi)

MotoGP
Pole position
Rider	(Italy) Franco Morbidelli	Yamaha
Time	1:38.798	
Fastest lap
Rider	(France) Fabio Quartararo	Yamaha
Time	1:40.142 on lap 9	
Podium
First	(France) Fabio Quartararo	Yamaha
Second	(Spain) Joan Mir	Suzuki
Third	(Spain) Álex Rins	Suzuki

Moto2
Pole position
Rider	(Italy) Luca Marini	Kalex
Time	1:43.355	
Fastest lap
Rider	(United Kingdom) Sam Lowes	Kalex
Time	1:43.544	
Podium
First	(Italy) Luca Marini	Kalex
Second	(United Kingdom) Sam Lowes	Kalex
Third	(Italy) Fabio Di Giannantonio	Speed Up

Moto3
Pole position
Rider	(Italy) Tony Arbolino	Honda
Time	1:47.762	
Fastest lap
Rider	(Italy) Romano Fenati	Husqvarna
Time	1:48.702 on lap 3	
Podium
First	(South Africa) Darryn Binder	KTM
Second	(Italy) Tony Arbolino	Honda
Third	(Italy) Dennis Foggia	Honda

The 2020 Catalan motorcycle Grand Prix (officially known as the Gran Premi Monster Energy de Catalunya) was the ninth round of the 2020 Grand Prix motorcycle racing season and the eighth round of the 2020 MotoGP World Championship. It was held at the Circuit de Barcelona-Catalunya in Montmeló on 27 September 2020.

== Background ==
=== Impact of the COVID-19 pandemic ===
The opening rounds of the 2020 championship were heavily affected by the COVID-19 pandemic. Several Grands Prix were cancelled or postponed after the aborted opening round in Qatar, prompting the Fédération Internationale de Motocyclisme to draft a new calendar. On 11 June, a new schedule based solely within Europe was announced. The Catalan Grand Prix, originally scheduled for June 7, was placed on September 27.

=== MotoGP Championship standings before the race ===
After the eighth round at the 2020 Emilia Romagna and Rimini's Coast Grand Prix, Andrea Dovizioso on 83 points, lead the championship by one point over Fabio Quartararo and Maverick Viñales, with Joan Mir a further 4 points behind.

In the Teams' Championship, Petronas Yamaha SRT with 147 points, lead the championship from Monster Energy Yamaha with 141. Suzuki Ecstar Team is third with 124 points, by 9 points over Ducati Team, while Red Bull KTM Factory Racing sat 5th on 110 points.

=== MotoGP Entrants ===
- Stefan Bradl replaced Marc Márquez from the Czech Republic round onwards while he recovered from injuries sustained in his opening round crash.

== Free practice ==
=== MotoGP ===
The first practice session ended with Fabio Quartararo fastest for Petronas Yamaha SRT ahead of Ducati Corse's Andrea Dovizioso and Team Suzuki Ecstar's Joan Mir. The second practice session ended with Franco Morbidelli fastest for Petronas Yamaha SRT, followed by Johann Zarco and Brad Binder.

=== Combined Free Practice 1-2-3 ===
The top ten riders (written in bold) qualified in Q2.

Pos.	No.	Bikers	Constructor	Free practice times		
Pos.	No.	Bikers	Constructor	FP1	FP2	FP3
1	20	(France) **Fabio Quartararo**	**Yamaha**	1:40.431	1:40.860	**1:39.418**
2	25	(Spain) **Maverick Viñales**	**Yamaha**	1:41.105	1:40.208	**1:39.462**
3	88	(Portugal) **Miguel Oliveira**	**KTM**	1:41.592	1:41.028	**1:39.507**
4	9	(Italy) **Danilo Petrucci**	**Ducati**	1:42.059	1:42.257	**1:39.702**
5	5	(France) **Johann Zarco**	**Ducati**	1:41.625	1:39.898	**1:39.709**
6	44	(Spain) **Pol Espargaró**	**KTM**	1:41.833	1:40.474	**1:39.756**
7	21	(Italy) **Franco Morbidelli**	**Yamaha**	1:41.219	1:39.789	**1:39.774**
8	46	(Italy) **Valentino Rossi**	**Yamaha**	1:41.536	1:40.502	**1:39.836**
9	33	(South Africa) **Brad Binder**	**KTM**	1:42.335	1:40.008	**1:39.841**
10	36	(Spain) **Joan Mir**	**Suzuki**	1:41.060	1:40.441	**1:39.862**
11	63	(Italy) Francesco Bagnaia	Ducati	1:41.790	1:41.337	**1:39.897**
12	43	(Australia) Jack Miller	Ducati	1:42.026	1:40.626	**1:39.919**
13	4	(Italy) Andrea Dovizioso	Ducati	1:40.861	1:41.124	**1:39.963**
14	42	(Spain) Álex Rins	Suzuki	1:41.316	1:40.538	**1:40.016**
15	30	(Japan) Takaaki Nakagami	Honda	1:41.609	1:40.412	**1:40.023**
16	35	(United Kingdom) Cal Crutchlow	Honda	1:41.549	1:40.754	**1:40.071**
17	41	(Spain) Aleix Espargaró	Aprilia	1:41.195	1:40.791	**1:40.133**
18	38	(United Kingdom) Bradley Smith	Aprilia	1:41.643	1:41.095	**1:40.226**
19	73	(Spain) Álex Márquez	Honda	1:42.061	1:40.478	**1:40.283**
20	53	(Spain) Tito Rabat	Ducati	1:42.992	1:41.673	**1:40.341**
21	27	(Spain) Iker Lecuona	KTM	1:41.640	**1:40.871**	1:40.977
22	6	(Germany) Stefan Bradl	Honda	1:41.969	1:41.260	**1:40.898**
OFFICIAL MOTOGP COMBINED FREE PRACTICE TIMES REPORT

Fastest session lap

Personal Best lap

== Qualifying ==
=== MotoGP ===
Pos.	No.	Rider	Constructor	Qualifying times		Final grid	Row
Pos.	No.	Rider	Constructor	Q1	Q2	Final grid	Row
1	21	(Italy) Franco Morbidelli	Yamaha	Qualified in Q2	1:38.798	1	1
2	20	(France) Fabio Quartararo	Yamaha	Qualified in Q2	1:39.008	2	1
3	46	(Italy) Valentino Rossi	Yamaha	Qualified in Q2	1:39.129	3	1
4	43	(Australia) Jack Miller	Ducati	1:39.399	1:39.225	4	2
5	12	(Spain) Maverick Viñales	Yamaha	Qualified in Q2	1:39.371	5	2
6	5	(France) Johann Zarco	Ducati	Qualified in Q2	1:39.378	6	2
7	44	(Spain) Pol Espargaró	KTM	Qualified in Q2	1:39.495	7	3
8	36	(Spain) Joan Mir	Suzuki	Qualified in Q2	1:39.628	8	3
9	9	(Italy) Danilo Petrucci	Ducati	Qualified in Q2	1:39.641	9	3
10	33	(South Africa) Brad Binder	KTM	Qualified in Q2	1:39.659	10	4
11	30	(Japan) Takaaki Nakagami	Honda	1:39.547	1:39.713	11	4
12	88	(Portugal) Miguel Oliveira	KTM	Qualified in Q2	1:40.188	12	4
13	42	(Spain) Álex Rins	Suzuki	1:39.751	N/A	13	5
14	63	(Italy) Francesco Bagnaia	Ducati	1:39.777	N/A	14	5
15	41	(Spain) Aleix Espargaró	Aprilia	1:39.973	N/A	15	5
16	35	(United Kingdom) Cal Crutchlow	Honda	1:39.988	N/A	16	6
17	4	(Italy) Andrea Dovizioso	Ducati	1:40.109	N/A	17	6
18	73	(Spain) Álex Márquez	Honda	1:40.164	N/A	18	6
19	27	(Spain) Iker Lecuona	KTM	1:40.490	N/A	19	7
20	6	(Germany) Stefan Bradl	Honda	1:40.721	N/A	20	7
21	38	(United Kingdom) Bradley Smith	Aprilia	1:40.838	N/A	21	7
22	53	(Spain) Tito Rabat	Ducati	1:41.013	N/A	22	8
OFFICIAL MOTOGP QUALIFYING Nr. 1 REPORT
OFFICIAL MOTOGP QUALIFYING Nr. 2 REPORT

== Race ==
=== MotoGP ===
Pos.	No.	Rider	Team	Manufacturer	Laps	Time/Retired	Grid	Points
1	20	(France) Fabio Quartararo	Petronas Yamaha SRT	Yamaha	24	40:33.176	2	25
2	36	(Spain) Joan Mir	Team Suzuki Ecstar	Suzuki	24	+0.928	8	20
3	42	(Spain) Álex Rins	Team Suzuki Ecstar	Suzuki	24	+1.898	13	16
4	21	(Italy) Franco Morbidelli	Petronas Yamaha SRT	Yamaha	24	+2.846	1	13
5	43	(Australia) Jack Miller	Pramac Racing	Ducati	24	+3.391	4	11
6	63	(Italy) Francesco Bagnaia	Pramac Racing	Ducati	24	+3.518	14	10
7	30	(Japan) Takaaki Nakagami	LCR Honda Idemitsu	Honda	24	+3.671	11	9
8	9	(Italy) Danilo Petrucci	Ducati Team	Ducati	24	+6.117	9	8
9	12	(Spain) Maverick Viñales	Monster Energy Yamaha MotoGP	Yamaha	24	+13.607	5	7
10	35	(United Kingdom) Cal Crutchlow	LCR Honda Castrol	Honda	24	+14.483	16	6
11	33	(South Africa) Brad Binder	Red Bull KTM Factory Racing	KTM	24	+14.927	10	5
12	41	(Spain) Aleix Espargaró	Aprilia Racing Team Gresini	Aprilia	24	+15.647	15	4
13	73	(Spain) Álex Márquez	Repsol Honda Team	Honda	24	+17.327	18	3
14	27	(Spain) Iker Lecuona	Red Bull KTM Tech3	KTM	24	+27.066	19	2
15	53	(Spain) Tito Rabat	Esponsorama Racing	Ducati	24	+27.282	22	1
16	38	(United Kingdom) Bradley Smith	Aprilia Racing Team Gresini	Aprilia	24	+28.736	21	
17	6	(Germany) Stefan Bradl	Repsol Honda Team	Honda	24	+32.643	20	
Ret	88	(Portugal) Miguel Oliveira	Red Bull KTM Tech3	KTM	18	Accident	12	
Ret	46	(Italy) Valentino Rossi	Monster Energy Yamaha MotoGP	Yamaha	15	Accident	3	
Ret	44	(Spain) Pol Espargaró	Red Bull KTM Factory Racing	KTM	12	Accident	7	
Ret	5	(France) Johann Zarco	Esponsorama Racing	Ducati	0	Collision	6	
Ret	4	(Italy) Andrea Dovizioso	Ducati Team	Ducati	0	Collision	17	
Fastest lap: (France) Fabio Quartararo (Yamaha) – 1:40.142 (lap 9)

=== Moto2 ===
Pos.	No.	Rider	Manufacturer	Laps	Time/Retired	Grid	Points
1	10	(Italy) Luca Marini	Kalex	22	38:11.103	1	25
2	22	(United Kingdom) Sam Lowes	Kalex	22	+0.981	3	20
3	21	(Italy) Fabio Di Giannantonio	Speed Up	22	+4.399	4	16
4	9	(Spain) Jorge Navarro	Speed Up	22	+5.608	2	13
5	16	(United States) Joe Roberts	Kalex	22	+5.797	7	11
6	33	(Italy) Enea Bastianini	Kalex	22	+6.080	10	10
7	72	(Italy) Marco Bezzecchi	Kalex	22	+8.552	6	9
8	44	(Spain) Arón Canet	Speed Up	22	+9.928	19	8
9	42	(Spain) Marcos Ramírez	Kalex	22	+14.874	8	7
10	23	(Germany) Marcel Schrötter	Kalex	22	+15.058	14	6
11	12	(Switzerland) Thomas Lüthi	Kalex	22	+17.687	11	5
12	45	(Japan) Tetsuta Nagashima	Kalex	22	+18.910	18	4
13	40	(Spain) Héctor Garzó	Kalex	22	+19.017	22	3
14	57	(Spain) Edgar Pons	Kalex	22	+19.315	17	2
15	24	(Italy) Simone Corsi	MV Agusta	22	+20.404	21	1
16	87	(Australia) Remy Gardner	Kalex	22	+24.358	16 (Note: 6-place grid penalty.)	
17	64	(Netherlands) Bo Bendsneyder	NTS	22	+27.561	28	
18	55	(Malaysia) Hafizh Syahrin	Speed Up	22	+36.014	25	
19	27	(Indonesia) Andi Farid Izdihar	Kalex	22	+36.101	29	
20	99	(Malaysia) Kasma Daniel	Kalex	22	+37.659	27	
21	74	(Poland) Piotr Biesiekirski	NTS	22	+1:00.256	30	
Ret	7	(Italy) Lorenzo Baldassarri	Kalex	21	Accident	24	
Ret	37	(Spain) Augusto Fernández	Kalex	20	Accident	12	
Ret	35	(Thailand) Somkiat Chantra	Kalex	20	Accident	26	
Ret	88	(Spain) Jorge Martín	Kalex	14	Mechanical	13	
Ret	97	(Spain) Xavi Vierge	Kalex	7	Accident	9	
Ret	96	(United Kingdom) Jake Dixon	Kalex	5	Throttle Cable	5	
Ret	11	(Italy) Nicolò Bulega	Kalex	3	Exhaust	15	
Ret	19	(Italy) Lorenzo Dalla Porta	Kalex	2	Collision	23	
Ret	62	(Italy) Stefano Manzi	MV Agusta	2	Collision	20	
OFFICIAL MOTO2 RACE REPORT

=== Moto3 ===
Pos.	No.	Rider	Manufacturer	Laps	Time/Retired	Grid	Points
1	40	(South Africa) Darryn Binder	KTM	21	38:32.507	9	25
2	14	(Italy) Tony Arbolino	Honda	21	+0.103	1	20
3	7	(Italy) Dennis Foggia	Honda	21	+0.157	13	16
4	11	(Spain) Sergio García	Honda	21	+0.232	10	13
5	21	(Spain) Alonso López	Husqvarna	21	+0.386	16	11
6	55	(Italy) Romano Fenati	Husqvarna	21	+1.436	15	10
7 (Note: 1-position penalty for exceeding track limits on the last lap.)	5	(Spain) Jaume Masiá	Honda	21	+1.218	5	9
8	13	(Italy) Celestino Vietti	KTM	21	+1.293	17	8
9	23	(Italy) Niccolò Antonelli	Honda	21	+1.928	6	7
10	2	(Argentina) Gabriel Rodrigo	Honda	21	+1.932	3	6
11	79	(Japan) Ai Ogura	Honda	21	+2.012	24	5
12	12	(Czech Republic) Filip Salač	Honda	21	+2.536	7	4
13	25	(Spain) Raúl Fernández	KTM	21	+3.572	2	3
14	82	(Italy) Stefano Nepa	KTM	21	+4.800	25	2
15	6	(Japan) Ryusei Yamanaka	Honda	21	+5.042	26	1
16	70	(Belgium) Barry Baltus	KTM	21	+5.656	31	
17	71	(Japan) Ayumu Sasaki	KTM	21	+6.729	18	
18	27	(Japan) Kaito Toba	KTM	21	+13.556	8	
19	52	(Spain) Jeremy Alcoba	Honda	21	+14.205 (Note: 6-second penalty for failing to serve a double long lap penalty.)	14	
20	54	(Italy) Riccardo Rossi	KTM	21	+14.437	20	
21	92	(Japan) Yuki Kunii	Honda	21	+23.202	29	
22	50	(Switzerland) Jason Dupasquier	KTM	21	+25.032	23	
23	73	(Austria) Maximilian Kofler	KTM	21	+35.469	30	
24	89	(Malaysia) Khairul Idham Pawi	Honda	21	+35.496	27	
Ret	16	(Italy) Andrea Migno	KTM	18	Handling	11	
Ret	99	(Spain) Carlos Tatay	KTM	17	Clutch	21	
Ret	9	(Italy) Davide Pizzoli	KTM	11	Accident	28	
Ret	53	(Turkey) Deniz Öncü	KTM	8	Collision	22	
Ret	20	(Spain) José Julián García	Honda	8	Collision	19	
Ret	17	(United Kingdom) John McPhee	Honda	5	Collision	12	
Ret	75	(Spain) Albert Arenas	KTM	5	Collision	4	
OFFICIAL MOTO3 RACE REPORT

== Championship standings after the race ==
Below are the standings for the top five riders, constructors, and teams after the round.

=== MotoGP ===
Riders' Championship standings

	Pos.	Rider	Points
1	1	(France) Fabio Quartararo	108
2	2	(Spain) Joan Mir	100
	3	(Spain) Maverick Viñales	90
3	4	(Italy) Andrea Dovizioso	84
	5	(Italy) Franco Morbidelli	77

Constructors' Championship standings

	Pos.	Constructor	Points
	1	(Italy) Ducati	126
1	2	(Japan) Suzuki	113
1	3	(Japan) Yamaha	113 (Note: Yamaha scored 163 points as a manufacturer, but were deducted 50 points after failing to respect MSMA technical changes protocols.)
2	4	(Austria) KTM	109
	5	(Japan) Honda	72

Teams' Championship standings

	Pos.	Team	Points
	1	(Japan) Team Suzuki Ecstar	160
3	2	(Malaysia) Petronas Yamaha SRT	148 (Note: Petronas Yamaha SRT riders scored 185 points, but the team was deducted 37 points after failing to respect MSMA technical changes protocols.)
1	3	(Japan) Monster Energy Yamaha MotoGP	128 (Note: Monster Energy Yamaha MotoGP riders scored 148 points, but the team was deducted 20 points after failing to respect MSMA technical changes protocols.)
1	4	(Italy) Ducati Team	123
1	5	(Italy) Pramac Racing	118

=== Moto2 ===
Riders' Championship standings

Pos.	Rider	Points
1	(Italy) Luca Marini	150
2	(Italy) Enea Bastianini	130
3	(Italy) Marco Bezzecchi	114
4	(United Kingdom) Sam Lowes	103
5	(Spain) Jorge Martín	79

Constructors' Championship standings

Pos.	Constructor	Points
1	(Germany) Kalex	225
2	(Italy) Speed Up	82
3	(Italy) MV Agusta	22
4	(Japan) NTS	9

Teams' Championship standings

	Pos.	Team	Points
	1	(Italy) Sky Racing Team VR46	264
	2	(Finland) Red Bull KTM Ajo	151
1	3	(Belgium) EG 0,0 Marc VDS	139
1	4	(Italy) Italtrans Racing Team	135
	5	(Germany) Liqui Moly Intact GP	111

=== Moto3 ===
Riders' Championship standings

	Pos.	Rider	Points
1	1	(Japan) Ai Ogura	122
1	2	(Spain) Albert Arenas	119
	3	(United Kingdom) John McPhee	98
2	4	(Italy) Tony Arbolino	95
1	5	(Italy) Celestino Vietti	94

Constructors' Championship standings

Pos.	Constructor	Points
1	(Japan) Honda	191
2	(Austria) KTM	187
3	(Sweden) Husqvarna	61

Teams' Championship standings

	Pos.	Team	Points
	1	(Spain) Gaviota Aspar Team Moto3	144
3	2	(Luxembourg) Leopard Racing	130
1	3	(Italy) Sky Racing Team VR46	130
1	4	(Japan) Honda Team Asia	122
1	5	(Italy) Kömmerling Gresini Moto3	115

== Notes ==
Previous race: 2020 Emilia Romagna Grand Prix	FIM Grand Prix World Championship; 2020 season	Next race: 2020 French Grand Prix
Previous race: 2019 Catalan Grand Prix	Catalan motorcycle Grand Prix	Next race: 2021 Catalan Grand Prix
