= 2020 Austrian motorcycle Grand Prix =

(Austria) 2020 Austrian Grand Prix
Race details
- Race 5 of 15 races in the 2020 Grand Prix motorcycle racing season
- Date: 16 August 2020
- Official name: myWorld Motorrad Grand Prix von Österreich
- Location: Red Bull Ring; Spielberg, Styria, Austria
- Course: Permanent racing facility; 4.318 km (2.683 mi)

MotoGP
Pole position
Rider	(Spain) Maverick Viñales	Yamaha
Time	1:23.450	
Fastest lap
Rider	(Spain) Álex Rins	Suzuki
Time	1:24.007 on lap 7	
Podium
First	(Italy) Andrea Dovizioso	Ducati
Second	(Spain) Joan Mir	Suzuki
Third	(Australia) Jack Miller	Ducati

Moto2
Pole position
Rider	(Australia) Remy Gardner	Kalex
Time	1:28.681	
Fastest lap
Rider	(Spain) Jorge Martín	Kalex
Time	1:29.102 on lap 2	
Podium
First	(Spain) Jorge Martín	Kalex
Second	(Italy) Luca Marini	Kalex
Third	(Germany) Marcel Schrötter	Kalex

Moto3
Pole position
Rider	(Spain) Raúl Fernández	KTM
Time	1:36.277	
Fastest lap
Rider	(South Africa) Darryn Binder	KTM
Time	1:36.670 on lap 4	
Podium
First	(Spain) Albert Arenas	KTM
Second	(Spain) Jaume Masiá	Honda
Third	(United Kingdom) John McPhee	Honda

The 2020 Austrian motorcycle Grand Prix was the fifth round of the 2020 Grand Prix motorcycle racing season and the fourth round of the 2020 MotoGP World Championship. It was held at the Red Bull Ring in Spielberg on 16 August 2020.

Andrea Dovizioso was the defending race winner, having won the race in 2019. The race was won by Ducati rider Andrea Dovizioso, in what proved to be final victory of his career, with Joan Mir in second for Suzuki, his first podium in MotoGP, while Jack Miller finished third for Pramac Racing.

The race day was notable for an unprecedented series of accidents in the MotoGP and Moto2 category respectively. On lap 4 of the Moto2 race, Enea Bastianini, who was fifth at the moment, suffered a huge highside on the exit of turn 1. Several backmarkers behind Bastianini were able to avoid his stranded bike, which was laying across the circuit on the approach to the back straight into turn 2. However, Hafizh Syahrin, who was running in seventeenth at the moment, came out of the slipstream of Jake Dixon and hit Bastianini's bike at over 200 kph. As a result, Syahrin was sent airborne and landed a further fifty metres ahead of the circuit. Edgar Pons and Andi Farid Izdihar were also involved in this accident. Syahrin was taken to the medical center with the suspicion of a leg injury and was therefore ruled out of the Styrian Grand Prix the next weekend.

The second crash occurred on lap 9 of the MotoGP race involving Johann Zarco and Franco Morbidelli, who came together on the approach to turn 3. By making contact with each other, Morbidelli and Zarco fell off their bikes, with Morbidelli's bike sliding across the grass on the outside of the track in full speed, then slightly taking-off before somersaulting multiple times before flying straight back on track onto the apex of turn 3 and narrowly missing out both Yamaha factory riders Maverick Viñales and Valentino Rossi, who were running in sixth and seventh place respectively. After missing both, the bike itself somersaulted a further multiple times before it came to a rest on the tarmac run-off, being completely destroyed. Zarco's bike however tangentially hit the safer barrier at high-speed and flew above the circuit, also narrowly missing out Viñales.

Both races were immediately red-flagged due to respective track-cleaning actions.

== Background ==
=== Impact of the COVID-19 pandemic ===
The opening rounds of the 2020 championship was heavily affected by the COVID-19 pandemic. Several Grands Prix were cancelled or postponed after the aborted opening round in Qatar, prompting the Fédération Internationale de Motocyclisme to draft a new calendar. However, the Austrian Grand Prix was not impacted by this change and kept its original date.

=== MotoGP Championship standings before the race ===
After the third round at the Czech Grand Prix, Fabio Quartararo on 59 points, leads the championship by 17 points over Maverick Viñales, with Franco Morbidelli a further 28 points behind. In Teams' Championship, Petronas Yamaha SRT with 90 points, lead the championship from Monster Energy Yamaha, who have 69. KTM Factory Racing sit 22 points behind the factory Yamaha in third, and are only 5 points ahead of fourth-placed Ducati Team, who have 42 points, while Esponsorama Racing sit 5th on 35 points.

=== MotoGP Entrants ===
- Stefan Bradl replaced Marc Márquez from the Czech Republic round onwards while he recovered from injuries sustained in his opening round crash.
- Ducati test rider Michele Pirro replaced Francesco Bagnaia in Austria while he recovered from injuries sustained in a crash during practice at the Czech round.

== Qualifying ==
=== Q1 ===
Johann Zarco and Valentino Rossi qualified for Q2.

Pos.	No.	Rider	Manufacturer	Time
1	5	(France) Johann Zarco	Ducati	1'23.865
2	46	(Italy) Valentino Rossi	Yamaha	1'23.891
3	9	(Italy) Danilo Petrucci	Ducati	1'23.915
4	41	(Spain) Aleix Espargaró	Aprilia	1'24.151
5	35	(United Kingdom) Cal Crutchlow	Honda	1'24.228
6	27	(Spain) Iker Lecuona	KTM	1'24.405
7	33	(South Africa) Brad Binder	KTM	1'24.485
8	73	(Spain) Álex Márquez	Honda	1'24.490
9	6	(Germany) Stefan Bradl	Honda	1'24.662
10	38	(United Kingdom) Bradley Smith	Aprilia	1'24.831
11	53	(Spain) Tito Rabat	Ducati	1'25.287
12	51	(Italy) Michele Pirro	Ducati	1'25.431
OFFICIAL MOTOGP Qualifying Nr. 1 REPORT

=== Q2 ===
Pos.	No.	Rider	Manufacturer	Time
1	12	(Spain) Maverick Viñales	Yamaha	1'23.450
2	43	(Australia) Jack Miller	Ducati	1'23.518
3	20	(France) Fabio Quartararo	Yamaha	1'23.537
4	4	(Italy) Andrea Dovizioso	Ducati	1'23.606
5	44	(Spain) Pol Espargaró	KTM	1'23.612
6	36	(Spain) Joan Mir	Suzuki	1'23.673
7	21	(Italy) Franco Morbidelli	Yamaha	1'23.719
8	42	(Spain) Álex Rins	Suzuki	1'23.731
9	5	(France) Johann Zarco	Ducati	1'23.828
10	30	(Japan) Takaaki Nakagami	Honda	1'23.872
11	88	(Portugal) Miguel Oliveira	KTM	1'23.939
12	46	(Italy) Valentino Rossi	Yamaha	1'23.995
OFFICIAL MOTOGP Qualifying Nr. 2 REPORT

== Race ==
=== MotoGP ===
The race, scheduled to be run for 28 laps, was red-flagged after 8 full laps due to an accident involving Johann Zarco and Franco Morbidelli. The race was later restarted over 20 laps with the starting grid determined by the classification of lap 8.

Pos.	No.	Rider	Team	Manufacturer	Laps	Time/Retired	Grid	Points
1	4	(Italy) Andrea Dovizioso	Ducati Team	Ducati	20	28:20.853	4	25
2	36	(Spain) Joan Mir	Team Suzuki Ecstar	Suzuki	20	+1.377	6	20
3	43	(Australia) Jack Miller	Pramac Racing	Ducati	20	+1.549	2	16
4	33	(South Africa) Brad Binder	Red Bull KTM Factory Racing	KTM	20	+5.526	17	13
5	46	(Italy) Valentino Rossi	Monster Energy Yamaha MotoGP	Yamaha	20	+5.837	12	11
6	30	(Japan) Takaaki Nakagami	LCR Honda Idemitsu	Honda	20	+6.403	10	10
7	9	(Italy) Danilo Petrucci	Ducati Team	Ducati	20	+12.498	13	9
8	20	(France) Fabio Quartararo	Petronas Yamaha SRT	Yamaha	20	+12.534	3	8
9	27	(Spain) Iker Lecuona	Red Bull KTM Tech3	KTM	20	+14.117	16	7
10	12	(Spain) Maverick Viñales	Monster Energy Yamaha MotoGP	Yamaha	20	+15.276	1	6
11	41	(Spain) Aleix Espargaró	Aprilia Racing Team Gresini	Aprilia	20	+17.772	14	5
12	51	(Italy) Michele Pirro	Pramac Racing	Ducati	20	+23.271	22	4
13	38	(United Kingdom) Bradley Smith	Aprilia Racing Team Gresini	Aprilia	20	+24.868	20	3
14	73	(Spain) Álex Márquez	Repsol Honda Team	Honda	20	+24.943	18	2
15	35	(United Kingdom) Cal Crutchlow	LCR Honda Castrol	Honda	20	+27.435	15	1
16	53	(Spain) Tito Rabat	Esponsorama Racing	Ducati	20	+28.502	21	
17	6	(Germany) Stefan Bradl	Repsol Honda Team	Honda	20	+28.609	19	
Ret	42	(Spain) Álex Rins	Team Suzuki Ecstar	Suzuki	10	Accident	8	
Ret	44	(Spain) Pol Espargaró	Red Bull KTM Factory Racing	KTM	8	Collision	5	
Ret	88	(Portugal) Miguel Oliveira	Red Bull KTM Tech3	KTM	8	Collision	11	
Ret	21	(Italy) Franco Morbidelli	Petronas Yamaha SRT	Yamaha	0	Did not restart	7	
Ret	5	(France) Johann Zarco	Esponsorama Racing	Ducati	0	Did not restart	9	
Fastest lap: (Spain) Álex Rins (Suzuki) – 1:24.007 (lap 7)

=== Moto2 ===
The race, scheduled to be run for 25 laps, was red-flagged after 3 full laps due to an accident involving Enea Bastianini, Hafizh Syahrin, Edgar Pons, and Andi Farid Izdihar. The race was later restarted over 13 laps.

Pos.	No.	Rider	Manufacturer	Laps	Time/Retired	Grid	Points
1	88	(Spain) Jorge Martín	Kalex	13	19:24.723	2	25
2	10	(Italy) Luca Marini	Kalex	13	+2.195	8	20
3	23	(Germany) Marcel Schrötter	Kalex	13	+4.782	3	16
4	22	(United Kingdom) Sam Lowes	Kalex	13	+7.249	6	13
5	97	(Spain) Xavi Vierge	Kalex	13	+7.325	16	11
6	72	(Italy) Marco Bezzecchi	Kalex	13	+7.771	10	10
7	12	(Switzerland) Thomas Lüthi	Kalex	13	+9.405	9	9
8	37	(Spain) Augusto Fernández	Kalex	13	+9.598	12	8
9	44	(Spain) Arón Canet	Speed Up	13	+10.023	5	7
10	16	(United States) Joe Roberts	Kalex	13	+10.890	11	6
11	7	(Italy) Lorenzo Baldassarri	Kalex	13	+11.170	13	5
12	77	(Switzerland) Dominique Aegerter	NTS	13	+11.803	24	4
13	35	(Thailand) Somkiat Chantra	Kalex	13	+13.002	17	3
14	96	(United Kingdom) Jake Dixon	Kalex	13	+13.385	15	2
15	40	(Spain) Héctor Garzó	Kalex	13	+15.865	21	1
16	11	(Italy) Nicolò Bulega	Kalex	13	+15.897	14	
17	62	(Italy) Stefano Manzi	MV Agusta	13	+15.913	19	
18	42	(Spain) Marcos Ramírez	Kalex	13	+16.222	26	
19	19	(Italy) Lorenzo Dalla Porta	Kalex	13	+18.830	27	
20	24	(Italy) Simone Corsi	MV Agusta	13	+22.614	28	
21	21	(Italy) Fabio Di Giannantonio	Speed Up	13	+25.079	23	
22	64	(Netherlands) Bo Bendsneyder	NTS	13	+29.300	29	
23	99	(Malaysia) Kasma Daniel	Kalex	13	+36.648	30	
Ret	87	(Australia) Remy Gardner	Kalex	4	Accident	1	
Ret	45	(Japan) Tetsuta Nagashima	Kalex	3	Accident	18	
Ret	9	(Spain) Jorge Navarro	Speed Up	0	Accident	7	
Ret	33	(Italy) Enea Bastianini	Kalex	0	Did not restart	4	
Ret	55	(Malaysia) Hafizh Syahrin	Speed Up	0	Did not restart	20	
Ret	57	(Spain) Edgar Pons	Kalex	0	Did not restart	22	
Ret	27	(Indonesia) Andi Farid Izdihar	Kalex	0	Did not restart	25	
OFFICIAL MOTO2 RACE REPORT

=== Moto3 ===
Pos.	No.	Rider	Manufacturer	Laps	Time/Retired	Grid	Points
1	75	(Spain) Albert Arenas	KTM	23	37:25.323	2	25
2	5	(Spain) Jaume Masiá	Honda	23	+0.049	4	20
3	17	(United Kingdom) John McPhee	Honda	23	+0.447	3	16
4 (Note: 1-position penalty for exceeding track limits on the last lap.)	79	(Japan) Ai Ogura	Honda	23	+0.121	13	13
5	13	(Italy) Celestino Vietti	KTM	23	+0.292	5	11
6 (Note: 2-position penalty for exceeding track limits on the last lap.)	40	(South Africa) Darryn Binder	KTM	23	+0.275	22	10
7	14	(Italy) Tony Arbolino	Honda	23	+0.487	8	9
8	53	(Turkey) Deniz Öncü	KTM	23	+1.083	10	8
9	25	(Spain) Raúl Fernández	KTM	23	+1.136	1	7
10	24	(Japan) Tatsuki Suzuki	Honda	23	+1.177	6	6
11	2	(Argentina) Gabriel Rodrigo	Honda	23	+2.221	7	5
12	16	(Italy) Andrea Migno	KTM	23	+1.924	12	4
13	71	(Japan) Ayumu Sasaki	KTM	23	+2.596	16	3
14	52	(Spain) Jeremy Alcoba	Honda	23	+2.228	18	2
15	82	(Italy) Stefano Nepa	KTM	23	+2.609	19	1
16	11	(Spain) Sergio García	Honda	23	+2.866	20	
17	55	(Italy) Romano Fenati	Husqvarna	23	+2.920	30	
18	54	(Italy) Riccardo Rossi	KTM	23	+3.486	9	
19	23	(Italy) Niccolò Antonelli	Honda	23	+4.276 (Note: 3-second penalty.)	15	
20	27	(Japan) Kaito Toba	KTM	23	+4.309	17	
21	7	(Italy) Dennis Foggia	Honda	23	+5.776	11	
22	99	(Spain) Carlos Tatay	KTM	23	+8.485	25	
23	21	(Spain) Alonso López	Husqvarna	23	+10.963	31	
24	6	(Japan) Ryusei Yamanaka	Honda	23	+23.563	21	
25	73	(Austria) Maximilian Kofler	KTM	23	+23.814	26	
26	92	(Japan) Yuki Kunii	Honda	23	+23.970	24	
27	9	(Italy) Davide Pizzoli	KTM	23	+23.929	27	
28	50	(Switzerland) Jason Dupasquier	KTM	23	+24.064	29	
Ret	12	(Czech Republic) Filip Salač	Honda	22	Retired	14	
Ret	70	(Belgium) Barry Baltus	KTM	6	Accident	23	
DNS	89	(Malaysia) Khairul Idham Pawi	Honda	0	Did not start	28	
OFFICIAL MOTO3 RACE REPORT

- Khairul Idham Pawi withdrew from the event due to effects of a broken finger suffered at the previous round in Czech Republic.

== Championship standings after the race ==
Below are the standings for the top five riders, constructors, and teams after the round.

=== MotoGP ===
Riders' Championship standings

	Pos.	Rider	Points
	1	(France) Fabio Quartararo	67
2	2	(Italy) Andrea Dovizioso	56
1	3	(Spain) Maverick Viñales	48
1	4	(South Africa) Brad Binder	41
2	5	(Italy) Valentino Rossi	38

Constructors' Championship standings

	Pos.	Constructor	Points
	1	(Japan) Yamaha	81
1	2	(Italy) Ducati	67
1	3	(Austria) KTM	57
1	4	(Japan) Suzuki	44
1	5	(Japan) Honda	37

Teams' Championship standings

	Pos.	Team	Points
	1	(Malaysia) Petronas Yamaha SRT	98
	2	(Japan) Monster Energy Yamaha MotoGP	86
1	3	(Italy) Ducati Team	76
1	4	(Austria) Red Bull KTM Factory Racing	60
2	5	(Japan) Team Suzuki Ecstar	50

=== Moto2 ===
Riders' Championship standings

	Pos.	Rider	Points
1	1	(Italy) Luca Marini	78
1	2	(Italy) Enea Bastianini	73
3	3	(Spain) Jorge Martín	59
	4	(United Kingdom) Sam Lowes	59
2	5	(Japan) Tetsuta Nagashima	55

Constructors' Championship standings

Pos.	Constructor	Points
1	(Germany) Kalex	125
2	(Italy) Speed Up	48
3	(Italy) MV Agusta	13
4	(Japan) NTS	9

Teams' Championship standings

	Pos.	Team	Points
1	1	(Italy) Sky Racing Team VR46	118
1	2	(Finland) Red Bull KTM Ajo	114
1	3	(Belgium) EG 0,0 Marc VDS	84
1	4	(Italy) Italtrans Racing Team	73
	5	(Spain) Openbank Aspar Team	60

=== Moto3 ===
Riders' Championship standings

	Pos.	Rider	Points
	1	(Spain) Albert Arenas	95
1	2	(United Kingdom) John McPhee	67
1	3	(Japan) Ai Ogura	65
	4	(Japan) Tatsuki Suzuki	50
	5	(Spain) Raúl Fernández	43

Constructors' Championship standings

	Pos.	Constructor	Points
1	1	(Austria) KTM	111
1	2	(Japan) Honda	110
	3	(Sweden) Husqvarna	17

Teams' Championship standings

	Pos.	Team	Points
	1	(Spain) Valresa Aspar Team	108
3	2	(Luxembourg) Leopard Racing	71
1	3	(Italy) Sic58 Squadra Corse	71
2	4	(Malaysia) Petronas Sprinta Racing	67
1	5	(Japan) Honda Team Asia	65

== Notes ==
Previous race: 2020 Czech Republic Grand Prix	FIM Grand Prix World Championship; 2020 season	Next race: 2020 Styrian Grand Prix
Previous race: 2019 Austrian Grand Prix	Austrian motorcycle Grand Prix	Next race: 2021 Austrian Grand Prix
