= FIM Moto3 Junior World Championship =

Motorcycle championship

- Category: Motorcycle sport
- Country: International
- Inaugural event: 2012
- Constructors: KTM, Honda, CFMoto
- Tyre suppliers: Pirelli

FIM Moto3 Junior World Championship, formerly known as FIM JuniorGP World Championship, is a junior class race event organized by Dorna Sports under FIM regulations. It runs under Moto3 regulations and acts as an Moto3 World Championship feeder. This class is restricted to single-cylinder 250 cc four-stroke engines with a maximum bore of 81 mm (3.2 inches). The minimum total weight for motorcycle and rider is 148 kg (326 lb).

== Motorcycle specifications ==
European Talent Cup uses the One Make Bike system so that all racers will use the same motorcycle

Various Bike Technical Data
Dimension	length 1,809 mm x width 560 mm x height 1,307 mm	
Wheelbase	1,219 mm	
Ground clearance	107 mm	
Seat height	729 mm	
Tank capacity	11 liters	
Frame type	Aluminum, twin tube	
Machine type	Liquid cooled 4-stroke engine	
Lubricant type	Semi dry sump, forced pressure and wet sump	
Transmission	6 speed	
Clutch type	Wet multi-plate	
Fuel supply system	PGM-FI	
Suspension	Front	Behind
Suspension	Inverted type telescopic	Swinger, Pro-link
Brake	Front	Behind
Brake	Single disc 296 mm, with 4-piston caliper	Single disc 186 mm, with single piston caliper
Tire size	Front	Behind
Tire size	90/580 R17	120/600 R17

== Sponsor ==
- Repsol
- HRC
- Dell'Orto
- Red Bull
- Dunlop
- Alpinestars
- Prosecco Doc
- Hawkers
- Bridgestone

== Champions ==
- 2012 : (Spain) Álex Márquez
- 2013 : (France) Fabio Quartararo
- 2014 : (France) Fabio Quartararo
- 2015 : (Italy) Nicolò Bulega
- 2016 : (Italy) Lorenzo Dalla Porta
- 2017 : (Italy) Dennis Foggia
- 2018 : (Spain) Raúl Fernández
- 2019 : (Spain) Jeremy Alcoba
- 2020 : (Spain) Izan Guevara
- 2021 : (Spain) Daniel Holgado
- 2022 : (Spain) José Antonio Rueda
- 2023 : (Spain) Ángel Piqueras
- 2024 : (Spain) Álvaro Carpe
- 2025 : (Spain) Brian Uriarte
- 2026 : (Spain) Carlos Cano
