= Circuito de Albacete =

Race track in Albacete, Spain

- Full Circuit (2015–present)

- Original Circuit (1990–2014)
- Location: Albacete, Spain
- Coordinates: 39°0′28.14″N 1°47′45.24″W
- Capacity: 7,200 seats
- Opened: 14 July 1990; 36 years ago
- Major events: Former: FIM CEV Moto3 Junior World Championship (2012–2019); FIA European Truck Racing Championship (1995, 2005–2011); FIM Endurance World Championship (2003–2011); Sidecar World Championship (1999, 2009); Spanish GT Championship (1999–2011); World Series by Nissan (1998–2002); World SBK (1992–1999)
- Website: http://www.circuitoalbacete.es

Full Circuit (2015–present)
- Length: 3.550 km (2.206 mi)
- Turns: 14
- Race lap record: 1:32.096 ( (Chile) Maximilian Scheib, BMW S1000RR, 2016, SBK)

Original Circuit (1990–2014)
- Length: 3.539 km (2.199 mi)
- Turns: 15
- Race lap record: 1:20.423 ( (France) Jean-Christophe Ravier, Dallara SN01, 2002, Formula Nissan)

Circuito de Albacete is a motorsports facility located in Albacete, Spain, opened in 1990. The main circuit is 3.550 km (2.206 mi) long with 14 turns, 8 of them right turns and 6 left turns. The facility can also be configured in two other layouts: a 2.237 km (1.390 mi) long circuit with 8 turns, 5 right and 3 left, and a 1.336 km (0.830 mi) short circuit with 6 turns, 5 right and 1 left.

== Events ==
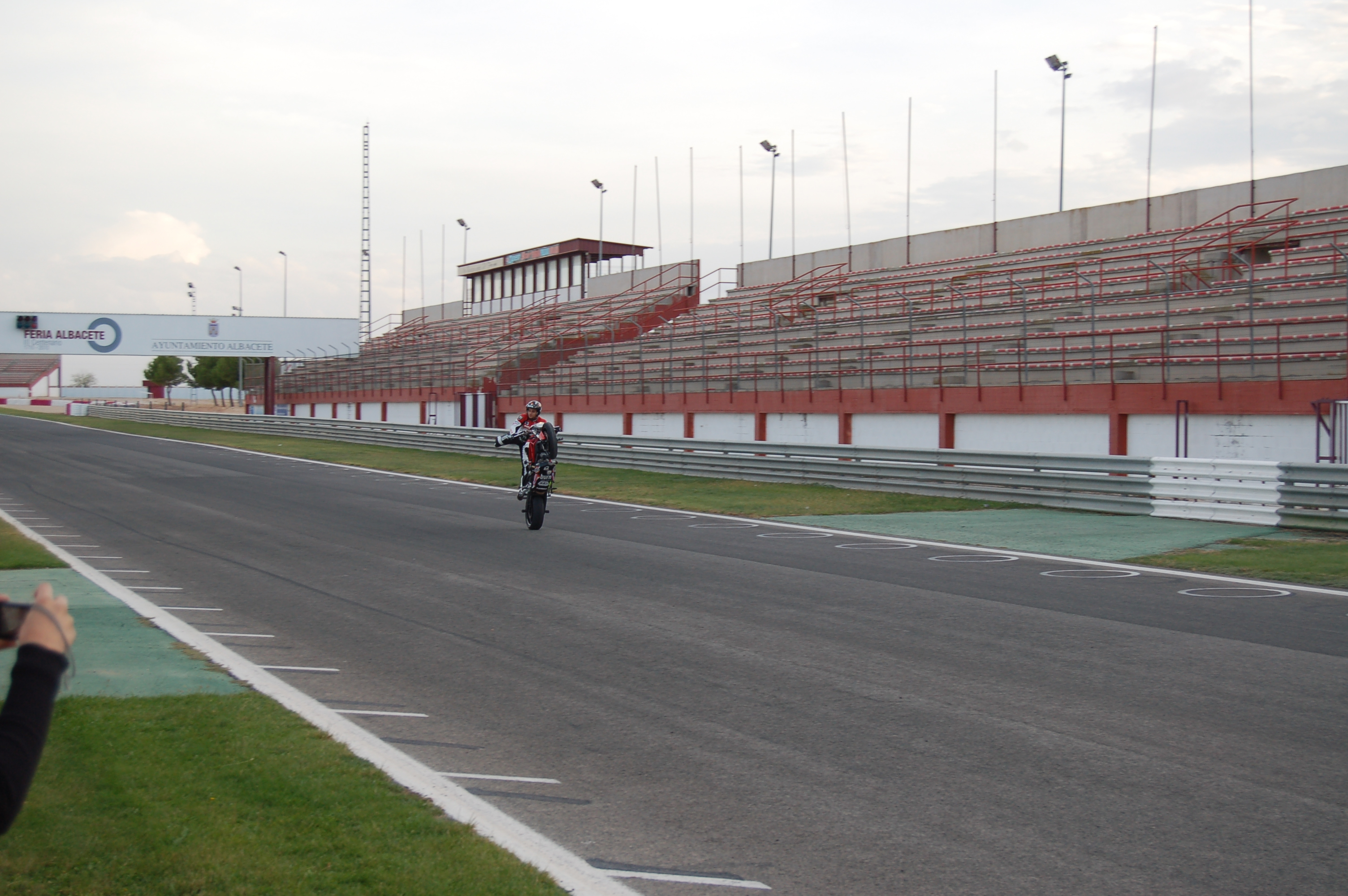
Main stands.

Annual racing events at the facility included the Endurance World Championship and the FIA European Truck Racing Championship.

The facility also used to host a Superbike World Championship round from 1992 until 1999.

== Lap records ==
As of October 2019, the fastest official race lap records at the Circuito de Albacete are listed as:

Category	Time	Driver	Vehicle	Event
Full Circuit (2015–present): 3.550 km (2.206 mi)
Superbike	1:32.096	Maximilian Scheib	BMW S1000RR	2016 Albacete FIM CEV Superbike round
FIM CEV Moto2	1:32.156	Héctor Garzó	Tech3 Mistral 610	2019 Albacete FIM CEV Moto2 round
FIM CEV Moto3	1:35.171	Daniel Holgado	Honda NSF250R	2019 Albacete FIM CEV Moto3 round
Original Circuit (1990–2014): 3.539 km (2.199 mi)
Formula Nissan	1:20.423	Jean-Christophe Ravier	Dallara SN01	2002 Albacete Formula Nissan round
F3000	1:21.940	Andrea Montermini	Reynard 92D	1992 Albacete F3000 round
Formula 3	1:23.286	Borja García	Dallara F300	2004 Albacete Spanish F3 round
GT1 (GTS)	1:29.508	Pedro Chaves	Saleen S7-R	2002 Albacete Spanish GT round
Superbike	1:30.186	Iván Silva	BMW S1000RR	2014 Albacete FIM CEV Superbike round
GT2	1:30.266	Álvaro Parente	Ferrari F430 GT2	2010 Albacete Spanish GT round
GT3	1:31.254	Luis Villalba	Mosler MT900R	2007 Albacete Spanish GT round
FIM CEV Moto2	1:31.283	Román Ramos	Ariane Moto2	2013 1st Albacete FIM CEV Moto2 round
World SBK	1:31.592	Akira Yanagawa	Kawasaki Ninja ZX-7RR	1999 Albacete World SBK round
FIM CEV Moto3	1:33.419	Jorge Navarro	Ioda Honda Moto3	2014 Albacete FIM CEV Moto3 round
World SSP	1:35.618	Pere Riba Cabana	Honda CBR600F	1999 Albacete World SSP round
Truck racing	1:56.468	Jochen Hahn	MAN TGS	2011 Albacete ETRC round
