= 2016 Red Bull MotoGP Rookies Cup =

Motorcycle racing competition

2016 Red Bull MotoGP Rookies Cup
Previous:	2015	Next:	2017

The 2016 Red Bull MotoGP Rookies Cup was the tenth season of the Red Bull MotoGP Rookies Cup. After the selection event held from 16 to 18 October 2015 at Circuito Guadix in Spain and pre-season testing, held from 1 to 4 April 2016 in Jerez, the season began at the same track on 23 April and ended on 25 September at the Ciudad del Motor de Aragón after 13 races. The races, for the fourth year contested by the riders on equal KTM 250cc 4-stroke Moto3 bikes, were held at seven meetings on the Grand Prix motorcycle racing calendar. The championship was won by Japanese rider Ayumu Sasaki at the last race.

== Calendar ==
2016 calendar
Round	Date	Circuit	Pole position	Fastest lap	Race winner	Sources
1	23 April	(Spain) Jerez	(Japan) Kaito Toba	(Russia) Makar Yurchenko	(Spain) Aleix Viu	
1	24 April	(Spain) Jerez	(Japan) Kaito Toba	(Japan) Ayumu Sasaki	(Japan) Ayumu Sasaki	
2	25 June	(Netherlands) Assen	(Spain) Raúl Fernández	(Ukraine) Mykyta Kalinin	(Spain) Raúl Fernández	
2	26 June	(Netherlands) Assen	(Spain) Raúl Fernández	(Spain) Raúl Fernández	(Spain) Raúl Fernández	
3	16 July	(Germany) Sachsenring	(Japan) Ayumu Sasaki	(United Kingdom) Rory Skinner	(Japan) Ayumu Sasaki	
3	17 July	(Germany) Sachsenring	(Japan) Ayumu Sasaki	(Japan) Ayumu Sasaki	(Japan) Kaito Toba	
4	13 August	(Austria) Spielberg	(Spain) Aleix Viu	(Spain) Marc García	(Spain) Marc García	
4	14 August	(Austria) Spielberg	(Spain) Aleix Viu	(Japan) Ayumu Sasaki	(Spain) Aleix Viu	
5	20 August	(Czech Republic) Brno	(Spain) Marc García	(Finland) Patrik Pulkkinen	(Spain) Marc García	
5	21 August	(Czech Republic) Brno	(Spain) Marc García	(Japan) Ayumu Sasaki	(Spain) Marc García	
6	10 September	(San Marino) Misano	(Italy) Mattia Casadei	(Spain) Aleix Viu	(Japan) Ayumu Sasaki	
7	24 September	Aragon	(Japan) Kaito Toba	(Japan) Ayumu Sasaki	(Japan) Kaito Toba	
7	25 September	Aragon	(Japan) Kaito Toba	(Spain) Rufino Florido	(Japan) Ayumu Sasaki	

== Entry list ==
2016 entry list
No.	Rider	Rounds
4	(Finland) Patrik Pulkkinen	All
11	(France) Alexandre Juanes	All
12	(Czech Republic) Filip Salač	All
13	(Netherlands) Walid Soppe	All
14	(Germany) Matthias Meggle	All
18	(Spain) Manuel González	All
19	(Spain) Rufino Florido	All
20	(Italy) Omar Bonoli	All
21	(Netherlands) Victor Steeman	All
22	(Ukraine) Mykyta Kalinin	All
23	(Spain) Raúl Fernández	All
27	(Italy) Mattia Casadei	All
36	(Netherlands) Sander Kroeze	All
40	(United States) Sean Kelly	All
41	(Spain) Marc García	1–5, 7
43	(Colombia) Steward García	All
44	(Germany) Kevin Orgis	All
67	(Japan) Kaito Toba	All
69	(United Kingdom) Rory Skinner	2–7
71	(Japan) Ayumu Sasaki	All
76	(Russia) Makar Yurchenko	1–5, 7
79	(Japan) Ai Ogura	All
81	(Spain) Aleix Viu	All
89	(Italy) Kevin Zannoni	All

== Championship standings ==
Points were awarded to the top fifteen riders, provided the rider finished the race.

Position	1st	2nd	3rd	4th	5th	6th	7th	8th	9th	10th	11th	12th	13th	14th	15th
Points	25	20	16	13	11	10	9	8	7	6	5	4	3	2	1

Pos.	Rider	JER (Spain)		ASS (Netherlands)		SAC (Germany)		RBR (Austria)		BRN (Czech Republic)		MIS (San Marino)	ARA (Aragon)		Pts
1	(Japan) Ayumu Sasaki	2	1	4	2	**1**	**3**	3	2	3	3	1	4	1	250
2	(Spain) Aleix Viu	1	2	Ret	10	3	2	**2**	**1**	2	7	2	2	22	201
3	(Spain) Raúl Fernández	3	13	**1**	**1**	2	4	5	7	4	2	5	7	2	195
4	(Spain) Marc García	DNS	5	2	9	6	5	1	3	**1**	**1**		6	6	170
5	(Japan) Kaito Toba	**Ret**	**Ret**	Ret	7	4	1	4	6	Ret	6	3	**1**	**Ret**	121
6	(United Kingdom) Rory Skinner			Ret	3	9	7	8	9	7	4	6	3	8	103
7	(Spain) Rufino Florido	4	3	Ret	DNS	8	Ret	9	4	8	17	4	18	3	94
8	(Kazakhstan) Makar Yurchenko	5	7	DNS	Ret	5	6	6	13	5	14		9	11	79
9	(Czech Republic) Filip Salač	15	Ret	9	6	10	8	11	10	Ret	11	11	5	5	75
10	(Italy) Mattia Casadei	Ret	11	6	4	7	Ret	16	15	6	12	**8**	10	14	68
11	(Japan) Ai Ogura	Ret	10	3	Ret	11	19	12	11	Ret	20	9	11	4	61
12	(Italy) Omar Bonoli	9	9	7	13	Ret	9	14	12	9	13	12	17	12	57
13	(Germany) Kevin Orgis	13	19	5	Ret	Ret	11	10	5	12	15	10	20	7	56
14	(Finland) Patrik Pulkkinen	14	17	11	16	15	13	7	8	Ret	5	18	8	10	53
15	(Italy) Kevin Zannoni	8	8	Ret	12	12	Ret	13	16	14	16	7	13	20	41
16	(Spain) Manuel González	7	6	12	Ret	17	15	17	18	15	8	16	21	9	40
17	(Colombia) Steward García	12	14	Ret	5	14	12	18	14	10	Ret	21	12	17	35
18	(Netherlands) Walid Soppe	6	4	Ret	Ret	Ret	Ret	15	20	Ret	9	13	Ret	Ret	34
19	(Ukraine) Mykyta Kalinin	11	15	Ret	8	13	10	21	19	18	18	14	14	13	30
20	(Germany) Matthias Meggle	10	12	10	Ret	Ret	DNS	19	Ret	11	10	15	Ret	15	29
21	(Netherlands) Victor Steeman	17	20	8	Ret	19	16	22	23	16	22	19	15	19	9
22	(United States) Sean Kelly	18	16	Ret	15	18	14	20	17	13	19	17	16	16	6
23	(France) Alexandre Juanes	16	18	Ret	11	16	18	23	21	Ret	23	22	Ret	21	5
24	(Netherlands) Sander Kroeze	DNS	DNS	Ret	14	20	17	24	22	17	21	20	19	18	2
Pos.	Rider	JER (Spain)		ASS (Netherlands)		SAC (Germany)		RBR (Austria)		BRN (Czech Republic)		MIS (San Marino)	ARA (Aragon)		Pts

Colour	Result
Gold	Winner
Silver	Second place
Bronze	Third place
Green	Points classification
Blue	Non-points classification
Blue	Non-classified finish (NC)
Purple	Retired, not classified (Ret)
Red	Did not qualify (DNQ)
Red	Did not pre-qualify (DNPQ)
Black	Disqualified (DSQ)
White	Did not start (DNS)
White	Withdrew (WD)
White	Race cancelled (C)
Blank	Did not practice (DNP)
Blank	Did not arrive (DNA)
Blank	Excluded (EX)

**Bold** – Pole position
Italics – Fastest lap
