= 2015 Red Bull MotoGP Rookies Cup =

Motorcycle racing competition

Seasons
- ← 2014 2016 →

The 2015 Red Bull MotoGP Rookies Cup was the ninth season of the Red Bull MotoGP Rookies Cup. After the selection event held from 14 to 16 October 2014 at Circuito Guadix in Spain and pre-season testing, held in April 2015 in Aragon, the season began at Jerez on 2 May and ended on 27 September at the Ciudad del Motor de Aragón after 13 races. The races, for the third year contested by the riders on equal KTM 250cc 4-stroke Moto3 bikes, were held at seven meetings on the Grand Prix motorcycle racing calendar.

Dutch rider Bo Bendsneyder won the championship, securing the title after the Misano race. Bendsneyder started the season with five successive victories, establishing a healthy championship lead. Ultimately, Bendsneyder won eight races during the season, and only finished off the podium on three occasions. Bendsneyder won the championship by 49 points ahead of Italy's Fabio Di Giannantonio, who was a three-time race winner at the Sachsenring, Brno and Aragon. Third place in the championship was decided in the final Aragon race between Silverstone winner Ayumu Sasaki, Marc García – who won the weekend's opening race – and Óscar Gutiérrez. Sasaki finished second to Di Giannantonio in the race to seal third in the championship, while García's fifth place to an eighth place for Gutiérrez ensured fourth in the final standings.

== Calendar ==
2015 calendar
Round	Date	Circuit	Pole position	Fastest lap	Race winner	Sources
1	2 May	(Spain) Jerez	(Netherlands) Bo Bendsneyder	(Italy) Fabio Di Giannantonio	(Netherlands) Bo Bendsneyder	
1	3 May	(Spain) Jerez	(Netherlands) Bo Bendsneyder	(France) Enzo Boulom	(Netherlands) Bo Bendsneyder	
2	26 June	(Netherlands) Assen	(Netherlands) Bo Bendsneyder	(Italy) Fabio Di Giannantonio	(Netherlands) Bo Bendsneyder	
2	27 June	(Netherlands) Assen	(Netherlands) Bo Bendsneyder	(Netherlands) Bo Bendsneyder	(Netherlands) Bo Bendsneyder	
3	11 July	(Germany) Sachsenring	(Spain) Óscar Gutiérrez	(Netherlands) Bo Bendsneyder	(Netherlands) Bo Bendsneyder	
3	12 July	(Germany) Sachsenring	(Spain) Óscar Gutiérrez	(Italy) Fabio Di Giannantonio	(Italy) Fabio Di Giannantonio	
4	15 August	(Czech Republic) Brno	(Italy) Fabio Di Giannantonio	(Spain) Marc García	(Italy) Fabio Di Giannantonio	
4	16 August	(Czech Republic) Brno	(Italy) Fabio Di Giannantonio	(Japan) Ayumu Sasaki	(Netherlands) Bo Bendsneyder	
5	29 August	(United Kingdom) Silverstone	(Netherlands) Bo Bendsneyder	(Spain) Raúl Fernández	(Netherlands) Bo Bendsneyder	
5	30 August	(United Kingdom) Silverstone	(Netherlands) Bo Bendsneyder	(Japan) Ayumu Sasaki	(Japan) Ayumu Sasaki	
6	12 September	(San Marino) Misano	(Netherlands) Bo Bendsneyder	(Spain) Marc García	(Netherlands) Bo Bendsneyder	
7	26 September	Aragon	(United Kingdom) Rory Skinner	(Spain) Raúl Fernández	(Spain) Marc García	
7	27 September	Aragon	(United Kingdom) Rory Skinner	(Italy) Fabio Di Giannantonio	(Italy) Fabio Di Giannantonio	

== Entry list ==
2015 entry list
No.	Rider	Rounds
4	(Finland) Patrik Pulkkinen	All
9	(Netherlands) Robert Schotman	All
13	(Czech Republic) Martin Gbelec	2–7
14	(Italy) Bruno Ieraci	1–4, 6–7
16	(Argentina) Emanuel Aguilar	All
19	(Spain) Rufino Florido	All
20	(Italy) Omar Bonoli	All
21	(Italy) Fabio Di Giannantonio	All
22	(Ukraine) Mykyta Kalinin	All
23	(Spain) Raúl Fernández	All
27	(Italy) Mattia Casadei	All
29	(United States) Gabriel Hernandez	All
37	(Netherlands) Walid Soppe	All
41	(Spain) Marc García	All
44	(Croatia) Martin Vugrinec	All
45	(Australia) Olly Simpson	All
64	(Netherlands) Bo Bendsneyder	All
67	(Japan) Kaito Toba	All
69	(United Kingdom) Rory Skinner	All
71	(Japan) Ayumu Sasaki	All
76	(Russia) Makar Yurchenko	All
81	(Spain) Aleix Viu	All
96	(Spain) Óscar Gutiérrez	All
99	(France) Enzo Boulom	All

== Championship standings ==
Points were awarded to the top fifteen riders, provided the rider finished the race.

Position	1st	2nd	3rd	4th	5th	6th	7th	8th	9th	10th	11th	12th	13th	14th	15th
Points	25	20	16	13	11	10	9	8	7	6	5	4	3	2	1

Pos.	Rider	JER (Spain)		ASS (Netherlands)		SAC (Germany)		BRN (Czech Republic)		SIL (United Kingdom)		MIS (San Marino)	ARA (Aragon)		Pts
1	(Netherlands) Bo Bendsneyder	**1**	**1**	**1**	**1**	1	Ret	2	1	**1**	**3**	**1**	DNS	9	243
2	(Italy) Fabio Di Giannantonio	5	2	2	2	4	1	**1**	**Ret**	2	11	Ret	6	1	194
3	(Japan) Ayumu Sasaki	6	Ret	6	6	2	Ret	6	5	3	1	3	4	2	161
4	(Spain) Marc García	9	8	5	5	3	2	4	3	Ret	Ret	4	1	5	151
5	(Spain) Óscar Gutiérrez	2	6	3	3	**5**	**DNS**	5	2	5	5	10	8	8	148
6	(France) Enzo Boulom	8	5	4	4	9	6	8	4	6	2	7	DNS	10	128
7	(Spain) Raúl Fernández	16	16	9	7	12	4	3	7	4	DNS	2	2	6	121
8	(Australia) Olly Simpson	3	3	Ret	DNS	8	5	17	Ret	7	Ret	6	15	4	84
9	(Japan) Kaito Toba	4	9	10	Ret	7	3	7	6	Ret	Ret	Ret	7	Ret	79
10	(United Kingdom) Rory Skinner	17	17	15	14	18	11	Ret	14	10	4	16	**3**	**3**	61
11	(Netherlands) Robert Schotman	10	13	Ret	10	11	9	10	13	12	9	9	14	11	61
12	(Spain) Rufino Florido	7	4	7	17	Ret	Ret	16	8	Ret	Ret	Ret	5	7	59
13	(Spain) Aleix Viu	13	11	8	20	6	7	11	9	19	Ret	5	DNS	DNS	58
14	(Italy) Mattia Casadei	Ret	10	14	Ret	14	8	9	Ret	9	8	8	12	16	52
15	(Russia) Makar Yurchenko	14	14	11	9	10	15	Ret	Ret	8	6	14	17	12	47
16	(Netherlands) Walid Soppe	11	7	Ret	13	17	Ret	13	10	11	7	15	Ret	20	41
17	(Czech Republic) Martin Gbelec			Ret	11	13	17	14	11	Ret	10	11	9	13	36
18	(Italy) Bruno Ieraci	12	12	13	8	Ret	10	DNS	DNS			12	DNS	15	30
19	(Finland) Patrik Pulkkinen	15	19	12	12	16	13	12	Ret	15	13	17	10	14	28
20	(Italy) Omar Bonoli	Ret	15	Ret	15	15	12	15	12	14	Ret	13	11	17	22
21	(Croatia) Martin Vugrinec	Ret	20	18	Ret	22	14	19	15	13	12	21	13	Ret	13
	(Ukraine) Mykyta Kalinin	19	Ret	17	18	21	Ret	18	16	18	Ret	20	16	18	0
	(United States) Gabriel Hernandez	18	18	Ret	16	20	16	Ret	18	17	Ret	18	Ret	Ret	0
	(Argentina) Emanuel Aguilar	Ret	Ret	16	19	19	18	20	17	16	Ret	19	18	19	0
Pos.	Rider	JER (Spain)		ASS (Netherlands)		SAC (Germany)		BRN (Czech Republic)		SIL (United Kingdom)		MIS (San Marino)	ARA (Aragon)		Pts

Colour	Result
Gold	Winner
Silver	Second place
Bronze	Third place
Green	Points classification
Blue	Non-points classification
Blue	Non-classified finish (NC)
Purple	Retired, not classified (Ret)
Red	Did not qualify (DNQ)
Red	Did not pre-qualify (DNPQ)
Black	Disqualified (DSQ)
White	Did not start (DNS)
White	Withdrew (WD)
White	Race cancelled (C)
Blank	Did not practice (DNP)
Blank	Did not arrive (DNA)
Blank	Excluded (EX)

**Bold** – Pole position
Italics – Fastest lap
