= Raúl Fernández (motorcyclist) =

Spanish motorcycle racer (born 2000)

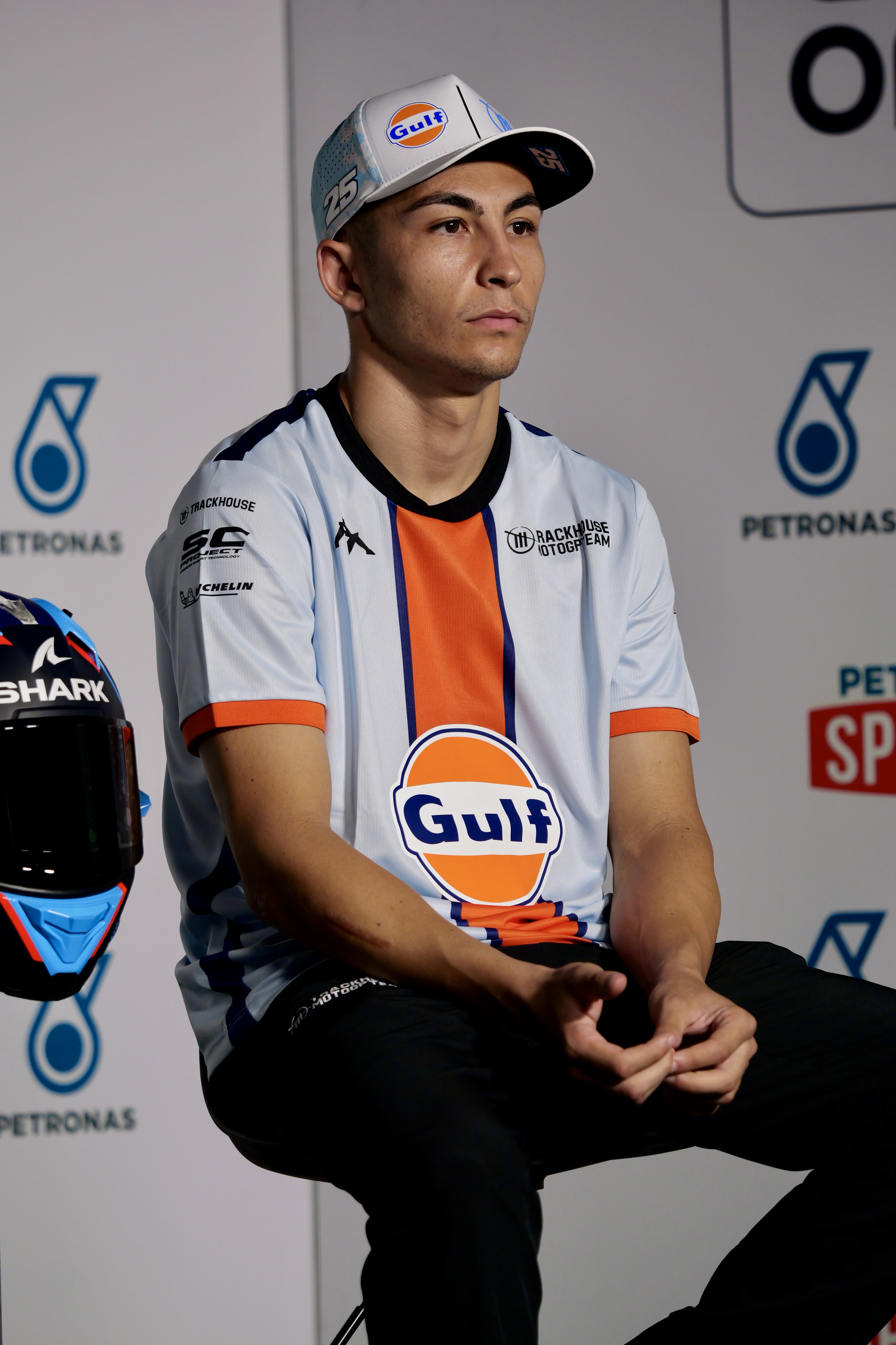
- Fernández at the 2025 Malaysian Grand Prix
- Nationality: Spanish
- Born: 23 October 2000 (age 26); Madrid, Spain
- Current team: SuperFile Trackhouse MotoGP Team
- Bike number: 25
Motorcycle racing career statistics
MotoGP World Championship
Active years	2022–
Manufacturers	KTM (2022); Aprilia (2023–)
Championships	0
2025 championship position	10th (172 pts)
Starts / Wins / Podiums / Poles / F. laps / Points; 95 / 2 / 7 / 1 / 2 / 539
Moto2 World Championship
Active years	2021
Manufacturers	Kalex
Championships	0
2021 championship position	2nd (307 pts)
Starts / Wins / Podiums / Poles / F. laps / Points; 18 / 8 / 12 / 7 / 7 / 307
Moto3 World Championship
Active years	2016–2020
Manufacturers	KTM, Mahindra
Championships	0
2020 championship position	4th (159 pts)
Starts / Wins / Podiums / Poles / F. laps / Points; 42 / 2 / 4 / 6 / 1 / 240

Raúl Fernández González (born 23 October 2000) is a Spanish Grand Prix motorcycle racer competing in the MotoGP World Championship with SuperFile Trackhouse MotoGP Team. His younger brother, Adrián, is also a motorcycle racer. He is 2018 FIM CEV Moto3 Junior World Champion. Raul has the record number of rookie wins (8) in Moto2, after beating Marc Márquez's previous record in the 2021 Moto2 World Championship.

== Career ==
=== Junior career ===
Fernández competed in the 2015 Red Bull MotoGP Rookies Cup, finishing third in Brno, second in Misano, and second in Aragón in his rookie campaign, ending the season seventh in the overall standings, with 121 points. He competed again in 2016, this time finishing on the podium six times (twice first, three times second, and once third), winning two races in Assen (both from pole position), and finishing the season in third overall. He was the 2018 FIM CEV Moto3 Junior World Champion.

=== Moto3 World Championship ===
==== MH6 Team (2016) ====
In the last race of the 2016 Moto3 World Championship, Fernández made his Grand Prix debut at Valencia, as the replacement for the injured María Herrera, scoring championship points with an 11th place.

==== Aspar Team (2017–2019) ====
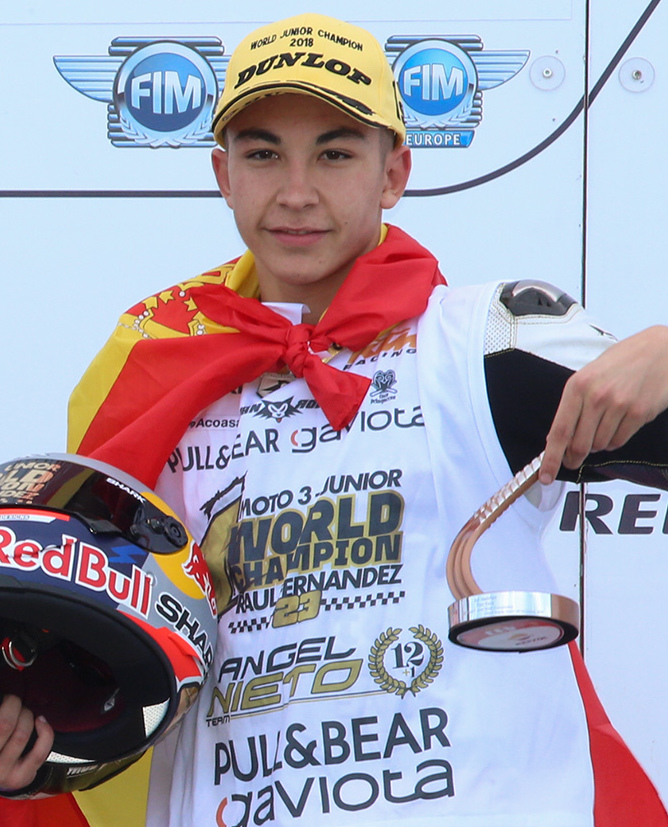
Fernández in 2018

Fernández would make three wild-card round entries for the Mahindra Aspar Team in 2017, finishing 25th in Jerez, retiring in Assen, and finishing 22nd in Germany.

Fernández would once again make four wild-card round entries for the Aspar Team in 2018, this time riding KTM bikes used by the Aspar team. He improved his prior season's results, and earned himself a full time ride for next year with his tenth place in Barcelona, ninth place in Germany, 17th place in Aragón, and 13th place in Valencia.

In his first full year in Moto3, Fernández had a decent rookie season, finishing in the points ten times, finishing in the top-ten six times, with his season's highest being a fifth-place finish in Germany. He ended the 2019 season 21st in the championship standings, with 60 points.

==== Red Bull KTM Ajo (2020) ====
Due to his good performances, Fernández was given a contract by the Red Bull KTM Ajo team for the 2020 season, which saw him steadily improve over the course of the year. He had six pole positions during the season (Czechia, Austria, Misano, Aragón, Valencia, and Portimao), two third places in Aragón and Valencia, and won the European Grand Prix, and Portuguese Grand Prix. He ended the season fourth in the championship standings, with 159 points, just 15 points away from first.

=== Moto2 World Championship ===
==== Red Bull KTM Ajo (2021) ====
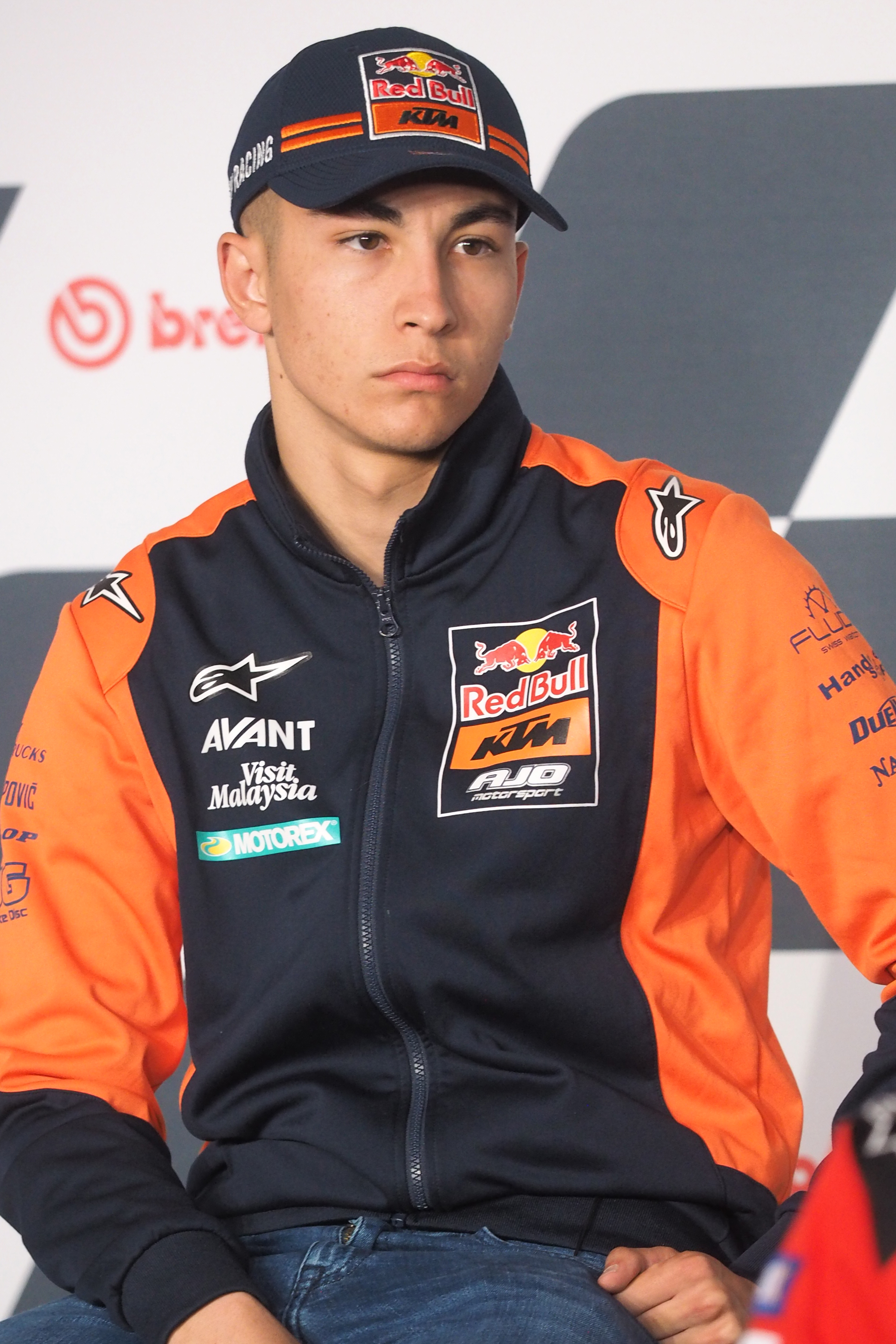
Fernández at the 2021 Algarve Grand Prix

Being promoted to Moto2, but staying with the Red Bull KTM Ajo family, Fernández had the best rookie season ever in Moto2, beating several records of Marc Márquez. He won eight races (Portugal, France, Netherlands, Austria, Aragón, Rimini, USA, and Valencia), had seven pole positions, stood on the podium 12 times, finished outside of the top-seven just the three times he retired from a race (Germany, Great Britain, Misano), and finished second in the standings, just 4 points away from teammate Remy Gardner, who won the title.

=== MotoGP World Championship ===
==== Tech3 KTM Factory Racing (2022) ====
In August 2021, it was announced that both Fernández and Gardner would be promoted to MotoGP, riding for Red Bull KTM Tech3 in the 2022 season. Fernández became just the third rider to be promoted to MotoGP after one lone season in Moto2, following Maverick Viñales, and Joan Mir.

==== RNF MotoGP Team (2023) ====
In August 2022, Fernández signed with RNF Racing for 2023, partnering Miguel Oliveira. Fernández finished the season in 20th place, 25 points behind teammate Oliveira who missed four races due to injury.

==== Trackhouse Racing (2024–) ====
Fernández's 2024 season saw slight improvement, finishing 16th in the rider standings. His standout moment in the season was briefly leading the sprint race at the Catalan Grand Prix. He saw consistent points finishes, and was partnered with rookie Ai Ogura for the 2025 season. He scored his first MotoGP win at the Australian Grand Prix in 2025.

In August 2026, Fernández renewed his contract with Trackhouse for 2027 and 2028. That same weekend, he won at the British Grand Prix for his second MotoGP win.

== Career statistics ==
=== FIM CEV Moto3 Junior World Championship ===
==== Races by year ====
(key) (Races in bold indicate pole position, races in italics indicate fastest lap)

Year	Bike	1	2	3	4	5	6	7	8	9	10	11	12	Pos	Pts
2014	KTM	JER1	JER2	LMS	ARA	CAT1	CAT2	ALB	NAV	ALG	VAL1; Ret	VAL2; Ret		NC	0
2015	KTM	ALG	LMS	CAT1; 13	CAT2; 15	ARA1	ARA2	ALB	NAV	JER1; 9	JER2; 10			14th	35
2015	Husqvarna											VAL1; 6	VAL2; 8	14th	35
2016	Husqvarna	VAL1; Ret	VAL2; 6	LMS; 9	ARA; 5	CAT1; 19	CAT2; 6	ALB; 4	ALG; 3	JER1; 3	JER2; 7	VAL1; 2	VAL2; 1	3rd	137
2017	Mahindra	ALB; Ret	LMS; DNS	CAT1; Ret	CAT2; Ret	VAL1; 9	VAL2; 12	**EST**; Ret	JER1; 23	JER1; Ret	ARA; 24	VAL1; 17	VAL2; 17	28th	11
2018	KTM	EST; 2	VAL1; 4	VAL2; 1	FRA; 2	CAT1; 8	CAT2; 4	ARA; 1	JER1; 2	JER2; 5	**ALB**; 1	VAL1; 3	VAL2; 4	1st	209

=== Red Bull MotoGP Rookies Cup ===
==== Races by year ====
(key) (Races in bold indicate pole position, races in italics indicate fastest lap)

Year	1	2	3	4	5	6	7	8	9	10	11	12	13	Pos	Pts
2015	JER1; 16	JER2; 16	ASS1; 9	ASS2; 7	SAC1; 12	SAC2; 4	BRN1; 3	BRN2; 7	SIL1; 4	SIL2; DNS	MIS; 2	ARA1; 2	ARA2; 6	7th	121
2016	JER1; 3	JER2; 13	**ASS1**; 1	**ASS2**; 1	SAC1; 2	SAC2; 4	RBR1; 5	RBR2; 7	BRN1; 4	BRN2; 2	MIS; 5	ARA1; 7	ARA2; 2	3rd	195

=== Grand Prix motorcycle racing ===
==== By season ====
Season	Class	Motorcycle	Team	Race	Win	Podium	Pole	FLap	Pts	Plcd
2016	Moto3	KTM	MH6 Team	1	0	0	0	0	5	32nd
2017	Moto3	Mahindra	Aspar Team	3	0	0	0	0	0	40th
2018	Moto3	KTM	Ángel Nieto Team Moto3	3	0	0	0	0	9	28th
2018	Moto3	KTM	Red Bull KTM Ajo	1	0	0	0	0	7	28th
2019	Moto3	KTM	Aspar Team	19	0	0	0	0	60	21st
2020	Moto3	KTM	Red Bull KTM Ajo	15	2	4	6	1	159	4th
2021	Moto2	Kalex	Red Bull KTM Ajo	18	8	12	7	7	307	**2nd**
2022	MotoGP	KTM	Tech3 KTM Factory Racing	18	0	0	0	0	14	22nd
2023	MotoGP	Aprilia	CryptoData RNF MotoGP Team	19	0	0	0	0	51	20th
2024	MotoGP	Aprilia	Trackhouse Racing	20	0	0	0	0	66	16th
2025	MotoGP	Aprilia	Trackhouse MotoGP Team	21	1	2	0	1	172	10th
2026	MotoGP	Aprilia	SuperFile Trackhouse MotoGP Team	17	1	5	1	1	236	7th
Total				**155**	**12**	**23**	**14**	**10**	**1086**	

==== By class ====
Class	Seasons	1st GP	1st pod	1st win	Race	Win	Podiums	Pole	FLap	Pts	WChmp
Moto3	2016–2020	2016 Valencia	2020 Aragon	2020 Europe	42	2	4	6	1	240	0
Moto2	2021	2021 Qatar	2021 Doha	2021 Portugal	18	8	12	7	7	307	0
MotoGP	2022–present	2022 Qatar	2025 Australia	2025 Australia	95	2	7	1	2	539	0
Total	2016–present				**146**	**12**	**23**	**14**	**10**	**1086**	**0**

==== Races by year ====
(key) (Races in bold indicate pole position; races in italics indicate fastest lap; ^{superscript} indicates point-scoring sprint position)

Year	Class	Bike	1	2	3	4	5	6	7	8	9	10	11	12	13	14	15	16	17	18	19	20	21	22	Pos	Pts
2016	Moto3	KTM	QAT	ARG	AME	SPA	FRA	ITA	CAT	NED	GER	AUT	CZE	GBR	RSM	ARA	JPN	AUS	MAL	VAL; 11					32nd	5
2017	Moto3	Mahindra	QAT	ARG	AME	SPA; 25	FRA	ITA	CAT	NED; Ret	GER; 22	CZE	AUT	GBR	RSM	ARA	JPN	AUS	MAL	VAL					40th	0
2018	Moto3	KTM	QAT	ARG	AME	SPA	FRA	ITA	CAT; 10	NED	GER; 9	CZE	AUT	GBR	RSM	ARA; 17	THA	JPN	AUS	MAL	VAL; 13				28th	16
2019	Moto3	KTM	QAT; 7	ARG; 15	AME; 7	SPA; Ret	FRA; 10	ITA; 11	CAT; Ret	NED; Ret	GER; 5	CZE; 12	AUT; Ret	GBR; 18	RSM; 10	ARA; 21	THA; 9	JPN; 19	AUS; Ret	MAL; 14	VAL; Ret				21st	60
2020	Moto3	KTM	QAT; 10	SPA; 6	ANC; 6	**CZE**; 6	**AUT**; 9	STY; 8	RSM; Ret	**EMI**; 6	CAT; 13	FRA; 7	**ARA**; 3	**TER**; 12	EUR; 1	VAL; 3	**POR**; 1								4th	159
2021	Moto2	Kalex	QAT; 5	DOH; 3	POR; 1	SPA; 5	**FRA**; 1	**ITA**; 2	CAT; 2	**GER**; Ret	**NED**; 1	STY; 7	AUT; 1	GBR; Ret	ARA; 1	**RSM**; 1	**AME**; 1	EMI; Ret	**ALR**; 2	VAL; 1					2nd	307
2022	MotoGP	KTM	QAT; 18	INA; 17	ARG; 16	AME; 19	POR; DNS	SPA; WD	FRA; Ret	ITA; 21	CAT; 15	GER; 12	NED; Ret	GBR; 21	AUT; 18	RSM; 13	ARA; 20	JPN; 18	THA; 15	AUS; 16	MAL; 15	VAL; 12			22nd	14
2023	MotoGP	Aprilia	POR; Ret	ARG; 14	AME; Ret	SPA; 15	FRA; WD	ITA; 17	GER; 15	NED; 12	GBR; 10	AUT; Ret	CAT; Ret	RSM; 8	IND; 10^{9}	JPN; 9	INA; 13	AUS; 16	THA; 15	MAL; Ret	QAT; 17	VAL; 5			20th	51
2024	MotoGP	Aprilia	QAT; Ret	POR; Ret	AME; 10^{9}	SPA; 11	FRA; 11^{9}	CAT; 6	ITA; 12	NED; 8	GER; 10	GBR; Ret	AUT; Ret	ARA; 16	RSM; 19	EMI; 13	INA; 10	JPN; 15	AUS; 10^{6}	THA; Ret	MAL; 16	SLD; 18			16th	66
2025	MotoGP	Aprilia	THA; Ret	ARG; 15	AME; 12	QAT; 17	SPA; 15	FRA; 7	GBR; 12	ARA; 10	ITA; 7^{8}	NED; 6	GER; 9	CZE; 5^{6}	AUT; 9	HUN; Ret	CAT; 11	RSM; 11^{9}	JPN; 7^{8}	INA; 6^{3}	AUS; 1^{2}	MAL; Ret	POR; DNS	VAL; 2^{4}	10th	172
2026	MotoGP	Aprilia	THA; 3^{3}	BRA; 10	USA; 8^{7}	SPA; 6^{6}	FRA; 8	CAT; 17^{4}	ITA; 8^{1}	HUN; Ret^{4}	CZE; 7^{6}	NED; 2^{1}	GER; 3^{5}	GBR; 1	ARA; Ret^{8}	RSM; 6^{7}	AUT; 12	JPN; 5^{8}	**INA**; 2	AUS; C	MAL; DNS	QAT; 3^{4}	POR	VAL	7th*	258*

* Season still in progress.
