= 2025 Czech motorcycle Grand Prix =

Motorcycle races in Brno

(Czech Republic) 2025 Czech Grand Prix
Race details
- Race 12 of 22 races in the 2025 Grand Prix motorcycle racing season
- Date: 20 July 2025
- Official name: Tissot Grand Prix of Czechia
- Location: Brno Circuit; Brno, Czech Republic
- Course: Permanent racing facility; 5.403 km (3.357 mi)

MotoGP
Pole position
Rider	(Italy) Francesco Bagnaia	Ducati
Time	1:52.303	
Fastest lap
Rider	(Spain) Marc Márquez	Ducati
Time	1:53.691 on lap 15	
Podium
First	(Spain) Marc Márquez	Ducati
Second	(Italy) Marco Bezzecchi	Aprilia
Third	(Spain) Pedro Acosta	KTM

Moto2
Pole position
Rider	(Belgium) Barry Baltus	Kalex
Time	1:58.322	
Fastest lap
Rider	(United States) Joe Roberts	Kalex
Time	1:59.468 on lap 10	
Podium
First	(United States) Joe Roberts	Kalex
Second	(Belgium) Barry Baltus	Kalex
Third	(Spain) Manuel González	Kalex

Moto3
Pole position
Rider	(Italy) Guido Pini	KTM
Time	2:05.019	
Fastest lap
Rider	(Spain) José Antonio Rueda	KTM
Time	2:05.454 on lap 12	
Podium
First	(Spain) José Antonio Rueda	KTM
Second	(Spain) Máximo Quiles	KTM
Third	(Spain) David Muñoz	KTM

The 2025 Czech motorcycle Grand Prix (officially known as the Tissot Grand Prix of Czechia) was the twelfth round of the 2025 Grand Prix motorcycle racing season. All races were held at the Brno Circuit in Brno on 20 July 2025.

This Grand Prix marked the return of MotoGP in Czech Republic, having held the last Grand Prix in 2020.

== Practice session ==
=== MotoGP ===
==== Combined Free Practice 1-2 ====
Fastest session lap

Pos.	No.	Biker	Team	Constructor	Practice times	
Pos.	No.	Biker	Team	Constructor	P1	P2
1	93	(Spain) Marc Márquez	Ducati Lenovo Team	Ducati	1:54.606	1:53.145
2	43	(Australia) Jack Miller	Prima Pramac Yamaha MotoGP	Yamaha	1:55.221	1:53.319
3	49	(Italy) Fabio Di Giannantonio	Pertamina Enduro VR46 Racing Team	Ducati	1:57.103	1:53.600
4	73	(Spain) Álex Márquez	BK8 Gresini Racing MotoGP	Ducati	1:55.371	1:53.613
5	44	(Spain) Pol Espargaró	Red Bull KTM Tech3	KTM	1:56.617	1:53.641
6	20	(France) Fabio Quartararo	Monster Energy Yamaha MotoGP Team	Yamaha	1:56.259	1:53.763
7	37	(Spain) Pedro Acosta	Red Bull KTM Factory Racing	KTM	1:55.679	1:53.826
8	5	(France) Johann Zarco	Castrol Honda LCR	Honda	1:56.541	1:53.926
9	72	(Italy) Marco Bezzecchi	Aprilia Racing	Aprilia	1:55.864	1:53.945
10	36	(Spain) Joan Mir	Honda HRC Castrol	Honda	1:57.715	1:53.965
11	88	(Portugal) Miguel Oliveira	Prima Pramac Yamaha MotoGP	Yamaha	1:56.272	1:54.012
12	1	(Spain) Jorge Martín	Aprilia Racing	Aprilia	1:57.128	1:54.055
13	25	(Spain) Raúl Fernández	Trackhouse MotoGP Team	Aprilia	1:57.431	1:54.093
14	10	(Italy) Luca Marini	Honda HRC Castrol	Honda	1:55.945	1:54.198
15	33	(South Africa) Brad Binder	Red Bull KTM Factory Racing	KTM	1:58.830	1:54.232
16	23	(Italy) Enea Bastianini	Red Bull KTM Tech3	KTM	1:55.598	1:54.237
17	42	(Spain) Álex Rins	Monster Energy Yamaha MotoGP Team	Yamaha	1:56.169	1:54.316
18	63	(Italy) Francesco Bagnaia	Ducati Lenovo Team	Ducati	1:55.259	1:54.333
19	54	(Spain) Fermín Aldeguer	BK8 Gresini Racing MotoGP	Ducati	1:57.921	1:54.507
20	30	(Japan) Takaaki Nakagami	Idemitsu Honda LCR	Honda	1:56.187	1:54.512
21	79	(Japan) Ai Ogura	Trackhouse MotoGP Team	Aprilia	2:11.904	1:54.618
22	7	(Spain) Augusto Fernández	Yamaha Factory Racing Team	Yamaha	1:56.531	1:54.686
OFFICIAL MOTOGP COMBINED PRACTICE TIMES REPORT

==== Practice ====
The top 10 riders (written in bold) qualified for Q2.

Pos.	No.	Biker	Team	Constructor	
Pos.	No.	Biker	Team	Constructor	Time results
1	93	(Spain) **Marc Márquez**	**Ducati Lenovo Team**	**Ducati**	**2:03.935**
2	5	(France) **Johann Zarco**	**CASTROL Honda LCR**	**Honda**	**2:04.404**
3	20	(France) **Fabio Quartararo**	**Monster Energy Yamaha MotoGP Team**	**Yamaha**	**2:04.465**
4	72	(Italy) **Marco Bezzecchi**	**Aprilia Racing**	**Aprilia**	**2:04.492**
5	1	(Spain) **Jorge Martín**	**Aprilia Racing**	**Aprilia**	**2:04.656**
6	43	(Australia) **Jack Miller**	**Prima Pramac Yamaha MotoGP**	**Yamaha**	**2:04.716**
7	36	(Spain) **Joan Mir**	**Honda HRC Castrol**	**Honda**	**2:04.811**
8	23	(Italy) **Enea Bastianini**	**Red Bull KTM Tech3**	**KTM**	**2:04.878**
9	73	(Spain) **Álex Márquez**	**BK8 Gresini Racing MotoGP**	**Ducati**	**2:04.993**
10	37	(Spain) **Pedro Acosta**	**Red Bull KTM Factory Racing**	**KTM**	**2:05.218**
11	25	(Spain) Raúl Fernández	Trackhouse MotoGP Team	Aprilia	2:05.257
12	54	(Spain) Fermín Aldeguer	BK8 Gresini Racing MotoGP	Ducati	2:05.305
13	63	(Italy) Francesco Bagnaia	Ducati Lenovo Team	Ducati	2:05.440
14	42	(Spain) Álex Rins	Monster Energy Yamaha MotoGP Team	Yamaha	2:05.473
15	33	(South Africa) Brad Binder	Red Bull KTM Factory Racing	KTM	2:05.500
16	49	(Italy) Fabio Di Giannantonio	Pertamina Enduro VR46 Racing Team	Ducati	2:05.627
17	44	(Spain) Pol Espargaró	Red Bull KTM Tech3	KTM	2:05.752
18	7	(Spain) Augusto Fernández	Yamaha Factory Racing Team	Yamaha	2:05.799
19	88	(Portugal) Miguel Oliveira	Prima Pramac Yamaha MotoGP	Yamaha	2:05.837
20	79	(Japan) Ai Ogura	Trackhouse MotoGP Team	Aprilia	2:06.308
21	30	(Japan) Takaaki Nakagami	Idemitsu Honda LCR	Honda	2:06.482
22	10	(Italy) Luca Marini	Honda HRC Castrol	Honda	2:06.805
OFFICIAL MOTOGP PRACTICE TIMES REPORT

=== Moto2 ===
==== Combined Practice 1-2 ====
Fastest session lap

Pos.	No.	Biker	Team	Constructor	Practice times	
Pos.	No.	Biker	Team	Constructor	P1	P2
1	16	(United States) Joe Roberts	OnlyFans American Racing Team	Kalex	2:12.746	1:58.444
2	18	(Spain) Manuel González	Liqui Moly Dynavolt Intact GP	Kalex	2:12.204	1:58.859
3	12	(Czech Republic) Filip Salač	Elf Marc VDS Racing Team	Boscoscuro	2:14.403	1:59.103
4	24	(Spain) Marcos Ramírez	OnlyFans American Racing Team	Kalex	2:13.511	1:59.174
5	14	(Italy) Tony Arbolino	Blu Cru Pramac Yamaha Moto2	Boscoscuro	2:11.078	1:59.302
6	7	(Belgium) Barry Baltus	Fantic Racing Lino Sonego	Kalex	2:12.156	1:59.393
7	96	(United Kingdom) Jake Dixon	Elf Marc VDS Racing Team	Boscoscuro	2:12.117	1:59.405
8	27	(Spain) Daniel Holgado	CFMoto Gaviota Aspar Team	Kalex	2:11.849	1:59.431
9	81	(Australia) Senna Agius	Liqui Moly Dynavolt Intact GP	Kalex	2:13.072	1:59.439
10	54	(Italy) Mattia Pasini	Fantic Racing Redemption	Kalex	2:12.940	1:59.458
11	28	(Spain) Izan Guevara	Blu Cru Pramac Yamaha Moto2	Boscoscuro	2:11.508	1:59.471
12	11	(Spain) Álex Escrig	Klint Forward Factory Team	Forward	2:12.214	1:59.571
13	75	(Spain) Albert Arenas	Italjet Gresini Moto2	Kalex	2:12.513	1:59.580
14	13	(Italy) Celestino Vietti	Sync SpeedRS Team	Boscoscuro	2:12.073	1:59.601
15	44	(Spain) Arón Canet	Fantic Racing Lino Sonego	Kalex	2:13.171	1:59.801
16	53	(Turkey) Deniz Öncü	Red Bull KTM Ajo	Kalex	2:12.767	1:59.899
17	21	(Spain) Alonso López	Sync SpeedRS Team	Boscoscuro	2:12.076	1:59.946
18	71	(Japan) Ayumu Sasaki	RW-Idrofoglia Racing GP	Kalex	2:13.761	1:59.994
19	10	(Brazil) Diogo Moreira	Italtrans Racing Team	Kalex	2:13.777	2:00.025
20	80	(Colombia) David Alonso	CFMoto Gaviota Aspar Team	Kalex	2:12.366	2:00.068
21	84	(Netherlands) Zonta van den Goorbergh	RW-Idrofoglia Racing GP	Kalex	2:14.215	2:00.158
22	15	(South Africa) Darryn Binder	Italjet Gresini Moto2	Kalex	2:12.969	2:00.176
23	95	(Netherlands) Collin Veijer	Red Bull KTM Ajo	Kalex	2:13.365	2:00.272
24	99	(Spain) Adrián Huertas	Italtrans Racing Team	Kalex	2:12.279	2:00.283
25	9	(Spain) Jorge Navarro	Klint Forward Factory Team	Forward	2:13.536	2:00.635
26	4	(Spain) Iván Ortolá	QJMotor – Frinsa – MSi	Boscoscuro	2:12.456	2:00.725
27	40	(Poland) Milan Pawelec	AGR Team Fusport	Kalex	2:14.979	2:00.756
28	92	(Japan) Yuki Kunii	Idemitsu Honda Team Asia	Kalex	2:12.991	2:01.142
29	61	(Spain) Eric Fernández	QJMotor – Frinsa – MSi	Boscoscuro	2:14.463	2:01.525
30	23	(Japan) Taiga Hada	Idemitsu Honda Team Asia	Kalex	2:14.054	2:01.744
OFFICIAL MOTO2 FREE PRACTICE TIMES REPORT

==== Practice ====
The top 14 riders (written in bold) qualified for Q2.

Pos.	No.	Biker	Team	Constructor	Time results
Pos.	No.	Biker	Team	Constructor	P1
1	16	(United States) **Joe Roberts**	**OnlyFans American Racing Team**	**Kalex**	**1:59.032**
2	12	(Czech Republic) **Filip Salač**	**Elf Marc VDS Racing Team**	**Boscoscuro**	**1:59.574**
3	18	(Spain) **Manuel González**	**Liqui Moly Dynavolt Intact GP**	**Kalex**	**1:59.604**
4	24	(Spain) **Marcos Ramírez**	**OnlyFans American Racing Team**	**Kalex**	**1:59.719**
5	81	(Australia) **Senna Agius**	**Liqui Moly Dynavolt Intact GP**	**Kalex**	**1:59.771**
6	54	(Italy) **Mattia Pasini**	**Fantic Racing Redemption**	**Kalex**	**1:59.906**
7	44	(Spain) **Arón Canet**	**Fantic Racing Lino Sonego**	Kalex	**1:59.907**
8	96	(United Kingdom) **Jake Dixon**	**Elf Marc VDS Racing Team**	**Boscoscuro**	**1:59.991**
9	21	(Spain) **Alonso López**	**Sync SpeedRS Team**	**Boscoscuro**	**2:00.022**
10	13	(Italy) **Celestino Vietti**	**Sync SpeedRS Team**	**Boscoscuro**	**2:00.090**
11	84	(Netherlands) **Zonta van den Goorbergh**	**RW-Idrofoglia Racing GP**	**Kalex**	**2:00.140**
12	9	(Spain) **Jorge Navarro**	**Klint Forward Factory Team**	**Forward**	**2:00.154**
13	28	(Spain) **Izan Guevara**	**Blu Cru Pramac Yamaha Moto2**	**Boscoscuro**	**2:00.167**
14	95	(Netherlands) **Collin Veijer**	**Red Bull KTM Ajo**	**Kalex**	**2:00.220**
15	53	(Turkey) Deniz Öncü	Red Bull KTM Ajo	Kalex	2:00.234
16	27	(Spain) Daniel Holgado	CFMoto Gaviota Aspar Team	Kalex	2:00.325
17	14	(Italy) Tony Arbolino	Blu Cru Pramac Yamaha Moto2	Boscoscuro	2:00.383
18	80	(Colombia) David Alonso	CFMoto Gaviota Aspar Team	Kalex	2:00.487
19	7	(Belgium) Barry Baltus	Fantic Racing Lino Sonego	Kalex	2:00.506
20	11	(Spain) Álex Escrig	Klint Forward Factory Team	Forward	2:00.667
21	71	(Japan) Ayumu Sasaki	RW-Idrofoglia Racing GP	Kalex	2:00.678
22	75	(Spain) Albert Arenas	Italjet Gresini Moto2	Kalex	2:00.752
23	15	(South Africa) Darryn Binder	Italjet Gresini Moto2	Kalex	2:01.012
24	99	(Spain) Adrián Huertas	Italtrans Racing Team	Kalex	2:01.058
25	4	(Spain) Iván Ortolá	QJMotor – Frinsa – MSi	Boscoscuro	2:01.060
26	92	(Japan) Yuki Kunii	Idemitsu Honda Team Asia	Kalex	2:01.314
26	23	(Japan) Taiga Hada	Idemitsu Honda Team Asia	Kalex	2:02.255
28	10	(Brazil) Diogo Moreira	Italtrans Racing Team	Kalex	2:02.448
29	61	(Spain) Eric Fernández	QJMotor – Frinsa – MSi	Boscoscuro	2:02.848
30	40	(Poland) Milan Pawelec	AGR Team Fusport	Kalex	2:03.130
OFFICIAL MOTO2 PRACTICE TIMES REPORT

=== Moto3 ===
==== Combined Practice 1-2 ====
Fastest session lap

Pos.	No.	Biker	Team	Constructor	Practice times	
Pos.	No.	Biker	Team	Constructor	P1	P2
1	99	(Spain) José Antonio Rueda	Red Bull KTM Ajo	KTM	2:14.677	**2:05.421**
2	31	(Spain) Adrián Fernández	Leopard Racing	Honda	2:14.048	**2:05.654**
3	28	(Spain) Máximo Quiles	CFMoto Valresa Aspar Team	KTM	2:14.614	**2:05.705**
4	71	(Italy) Dennis Foggia	CFMoto Valresa Aspar Team	KTM	2:17.231	**2:05.785**
5	10	(Italy) Nicola Carraro	Rivacold Snipers Team	Honda	2:15.417	**2:05.999**
6	66	(Australia) Joel Kelso	LEVELUP-MTA	KTM	2:16.897	**2:06.080**
7	19	(United Kingdom) Scott Ogden	CIP Green Power	KTM	2:15.000	**2:06.087**
8	94	(Italy) Guido Pini	Liqui Moly Dynavolt Intact GP	KTM	2:15.273	**2:06.155**
9	22	(Spain) David Almansa	Leopard Racing	Honda	2:13.933	**2:06.292**
10	36	(Spain) Ángel Piqueras	Frinsa – MT Helmets – MSI	KTM	2:16.111	**2:06.352**
11	89	(Spain) Marcos Uriarte	LEVELUP-MTA	KTM	2:16.368	**2:06.403**
12	55	(Switzerland) Noah Dettwiler	CIP Green Power	KTM	2:14.599	**2:06.403**
13	6	(Japan) Ryusei Yamanaka	Frinsa – MT Helmets – MSI	KTM	2:15.408	**2:06.429**
14	95	(Argentina) Marco Morelli	Denssi Racing – BOE	KTM	2:16.367	**2:06.462**
15	82	(Italy) Stefano Nepa	Sic58 Squadra Corse	Honda	2:17.289	**2:06.472**
16	64	(Spain) David Muñoz	Liqui Moly Dynavolt Intact GP	KTM	2:15.250	**2:06.495**
17	8	(United Kingdom) Eddie O'Shea	GRYD - Mlav Racing	Honda	2:15.527	**2:06.542**
18	73	(Argentina) Valentín Perrone	Red Bull KTM Tech3	KTM	2:15.105	**2:06.808**
19	83	(Spain) Álvaro Carpe	Red Bull KTM Ajo	KTM	2:17.192	**2:07.087**
20	72	(Japan) Taiyo Furusato	Honda Team Asia	Honda	2:16.268	**2:07.092**
21	54	(Italy) Riccardo Rossi	Rivacold Snipers Team	Honda	2:16.779	**2:07.364**
22	12	(Australia) Jacob Roulstone	Red Bull KTM Tech3	KTM	2:16.392	**2:07.636**
23	25	(Italy) Leonardo Abruzzo	GRYD - Mlav Racing	Honda	2:17.688	**2:07.647**
24	48	(Switzerland) Lennox Phommara	Sic58 Squadra Corse	Honda	2:16.818	**2:07.895**
25	14	(New Zealand) Cormac Buchanan	Denssi Racing – BOE	KTM	**2:14.511**	N/A
OFFICIAL MOTO3 FREE PRACTICE TIMES REPORT

==== Practice ====
The top 14 riders (written in bold) qualified for Q2.

Pos.	No.	Biker	Team	Constructor	Practice times
Pos.	No.	Biker	Team	Constructor	P1
1	83	(Spain) **Álvaro Carpe**	**Red Bull KTM Ajo**	**KTM**	**2:05.840**
2	99	(Spain) **José Antonio Rueda**	**Red Bull KTM Ajo**	**KTM**	**2:05.997**
3	28	(Spain) **Máximo Quiles**	**CFMoto Valresa Aspar Team**	**KTM**	**2:06.174**
4	94	(Italy) **Guido Pini**	**Liqui Moly Dynavolt Intact GP**	**KTM**	**2:06.211**
5	73	(Argentina) **Valentín Perrone**	**Red Bull KTM Tech3**	**KTM**	**2:06.278**
6	64	(Spain) **David Muñoz**	**Liqui Moly Dynavolt Intact GP**	**KTM**	**2:06.330**
7	66	(Australia) **Joel Kelso**	**LEVELUP-MTA**	**KTM**	**2:06.354**
8	71	(Italy) **Dennis Foggia**	**CFMoto Valresa Aspar Team**	**KTM**	**2:06.403**
9	6	(Japan) **Ryusei Yamanaka**	**Frinsa – MT Helmets – MSI**	**KTM**	**2:06.430**
10	19	(United Kingdom) **Scott Ogden**	**CIP Green Power**	**KTM**	**2:06.637**
11	12	(Australia) **Jacob Roulstone**	**Red Bull KTM Tech3**	**KTM**	**2:06.646**
12	10	(Italy) **Nicola Carraro**	**Rivacold Snipers Team**	**Honda**	**2:06.699**
13	22	(Spain) **David Almansa**	**Leopard Racing**	**Honda**	**2:06.709**
14	31	(Spain) **Adrián Fernández**	**Leopard Racing**	**Honda**	**2:06.712**
15	36	(Spain) Ángel Piqueras	Frinsa – MT Helmets – MSI	KTM	2:06.825
16	54	(Italy) Riccardo Rossi	Rivacold Snipers Team	Honda	2:06.914
17	82	(Italy) Stefano Nepa	Sic58 Squadra Corse	Honda	2:06.965
18	95	(Argentina) Marco Morelli	Denssi Racing – BOE	KTM	2:07.107
19	89	(Spain) Marcos Uriarte	LEVELUP-MTA	KTM	2:07.202
20	55	(Switzerland) Noah Dettwiler	CIP Green Power	KTM	2:07.240
21	14	(New Zealand) Cormac Buchanan	Denssi Racing – BOE	KTM	2:07.533
22	72	(Japan) Taiyo Furusato	Honda Team Asia	Honda	2:07.665
23	8	(United Kingdom) Eddie O'Shea	GRYD - Mlav Racing	Honda	2:07.878
24	48	(Switzerland) Lenoxx Phommara	Sic58 Squadra Corse	Honda	2:07.968
25	25	(Italy) Leonardo Abruzzo	GRYD - Mlav Racing	Honda	2:08.308
OFFICIAL MOTO3 PRACTICE TIMES REPORT

== Qualifying ==
=== MotoGP ===
Fastest session lap

Pos.	No.	Biker	Team	Constructor	Qualifying times		Final grid	Row
Pos.	No.	Biker	Team	Constructor	Q1	Q2	Final grid	Row
1	63	(Italy) Francesco Bagnaia	Ducati Lenovo Team	Ducati	1:52.715	1:52.303	1	1
2	93	(Spain) Marc Márquez	Ducati Lenovo Team	Ducati	Qualified in Q2	1:52.522	2	1
3	20	(France) Fabio Quartararo	Monster Energy Yamaha MotoGP Team	Yamaha	Qualified in Q2	1:52.608	3	1
4	72	(Italy) Marco Bezzecchi	Aprilia Racing	Aprilia	Qualified in Q2	1:52.644	4	2
5	36	(Spain) Joan Mir	Honda HRC Castrol	Honda	Qualified in Q2	1:52.763	5	2
6	25	(Spain) Raúl Fernández	Trackhouse MotoGP Team	Aprilia	1:52.775	1:52.796	6	2
7	37	(Spain) Pedro Acosta	Red Bull KTM Factory Racing	KTM	Qualified in Q2	1:52.830	7	3
8	73	(Spain) Álex Márquez	BK8 Gresini Racing MotoGP	Ducati	Qualified in Q2	1:52.850	8	3
9	5	(France) Johann Zarco	Castrol Honda LCR	Honda	Qualified in Q2	1:52.877	9	3
10	43	(Australia) Jack Miller	Prima Pramac Yamaha MotoGP	Yamaha	Qualified in Q2	1:52.980	10	4
11	23	(Italy) Enea Bastianini	Red Bull KTM Tech3	KTM	Qualified in Q2	1:53.317	11	4
12	1	(Spain) Jorge Martín	Aprilia Racing	Aprilia	Qualified in Q2	1:53.614	12	4
13	49	(Italy) Fabio Di Giannantonio	Pertamina Enduro VR46 Racing Team	Ducati	1:52.872	N/A	13	5
14	44	(Spain) Pol Espargaró	Red Bull KTM Tech3	KTM	1:53.021	N/A	14	5
15	42	(Spain) Álex Rins	Monster Energy Yamaha MotoGP Team	Yamaha	1:53.085	N/A	15	5
16	10	(Italy) Luca Marini	Honda HRC Castrol	Honda	1:53.157	N/A	16	6
17	88	(Portugal) Miguel Oliveira	Prima Pramac Yamaha MotoGP	Yamaha	1:53.227	N/A	17	6
18	54	(Spain) Fermín Aldeguer	BK8 Gresini Racing MotoGP	Ducati	1:53.341	N/A	18	6
19	33	(South Africa) Brad Binder	Red Bull KTM Factory Racing	KTM	1:53.561	N/A	19	7
20	30	(Japan) Takaaki Nakagami	Idemitsu Honda LCR	Honda	1:53.562	N/A	20	7
21	79	(Japan) Ai Ogura	Trackhouse MotoGP Team	Aprilia	1:53.737	N/A	21	7
22	7	(Spain) Augusto Fernández	Yamaha Factory Racing Team	Yamaha	1:53.744	N/A	22	8
OFFICIAL MOTOGP QUALIFYING TIMES REPORT

=== Moto2 ===
Fastest session lap

Pos.	No.	Biker	Team	Constructor	Qualifying times		Final grid	Row
Pos.	No.	Biker	Team	Constructor	P1	P2	Final grid	Row
1	7	(Belgium) Barry Baltus	Fantic Racing Lino Sonego	Kalex	1:58.766	1:58.322	1	1
2	16	(United States) Joe Roberts	OnlyFans American Racing Team	Kalex	Qualified in Q2	1:58.342	2	1
3	24	(Spain) Marcos Ramírez	OnlyFans American Racing Team	Kalex	Qualified in Q2	1:58.579	3	1
4	18	(Spain) Manuel González	Liqui Moly Dynavolt Intact GP	Kalex	Qualified in Q2	1:58.711	4	2
5	27	(Spain) Daniel Holgado	CFMoto Inde Aspar Team	Kalex	1:58.980	1:58.805	5	2
6	81	(Australia) Senna Agius	Liqui Moly Dynavolt Intact GP	Kalex	Qualified in Q2	1:58.890	6	2
7	96	(United Kingdom) Jake Dixon	Elf Marc VDS Racing Team	Boscoscuro	Qualified in Q2	1:58.980	7	3
8	54	(Italy) Mattia Pasini	Fantic Racing Redemption	Kalex	Qualified in Q2	1:59.019	8	3
9	12	(Czech Republic) Filip Salač	Elf Marc VDS Racing Team	Boscoscuro	Qualified in Q2	1:59.103	9	3
10	21	(Spain) Alonso López	Folladore SpeedRS Team	Boscoscuro	Qualified in Q2	1:59.143	10	4
11	13	(Italy) Celestino Vietti	Folladore SpeedRS Team	Boscoscuro	Qualified in Q2	1:59.147	11	4
12	28	(Spain) Izan Guevara	Blu Cru Pramac Yamaha Moto2	Boscoscuro	Qualified in Q2	1:59.192	12	4
13	9	(Spain) Jorge Navarro	Klint Forward Factory Team	Forward	Qualified in Q2	1:59.262	13	5
14	4	(Spain) Iván Ortolá	QJMotor – Frinsa – MSi	Boscoscuro	1:59.026	1:59.329	14	5
15	84	(Netherlands) Zonta van den Goorbergh	RW-Idrofoglia Racing GP	Kalex	Qualified in Q2	1:59.348	15	5
16	95	(Netherlands) Collin Veijer	Red Bull KTM Ajo	Kalex	Qualified in Q2	1:59.411	16	6
17	75	(Spain) Albert Arenas	Italjet Gresini Moto2	Kalex	1:58.950	2:00.661	17	6
18	44	(Spain) Arón Canet	Fantic Racing Lino Sonego	Kalex	Qualified in Q2	No time set	18	6
19	14	(Italy) Tony Arbolino	Blu Cru Pramac Yamaha Moto2	Boscoscuro	1:59.186	N/A	19	7
20	80	(Colombia) David Alonso	CFMoto Inde Aspar Team	Kalex	1:59.186	N/A	20	7
21	53	(Turkey) Deniz Öncü	Red Bull KTM Ajo	Kalex	1:59.189	N/A	21	7
22	11	(Spain) Alex Escrig	Klint Forward Factory Team	Forward	1:59.237	N/A	22	8
23	71	(Japan) Ayumu Sasaki	RW-Idrofoglia Racing GP	Kalex	1:59.242	N/A	23	8
24	15	(South Africa) Darryn Binder	Italjet Gresini Moto2	Kalex	1:59.457	N/A	24	8
25	99	(Spain) Adrián Huertas	Italtrans Racing Team	Kalex	1:59.661	N/A	25	9
26	15	(Japan) Taiga Hada	Idemitsu Honda Team Asia	Kalex	2:00.253	N/A	26	9
27	92	(Japan) Yuki Kunii	Idemitsu Honda Team Asia	Kalex	2:00.420	N/A	27	9
28	61	(Spain) Eric Fernández	QJMotor – Frinsa – MSi	Boscoscuro	2:00.500	N/A	28	10
29	40	(Poland) Milan Pawelec	AGR Team Fusport	Kalex	2:00.682	N/A	29	10
OFFICIAL MOTO2 QUALIFYING TIMES REPORT

- Diogo Moreira miss the Qualifying session.

=== Moto3 ===
Fastest session lap

Pos.	No.	Biker	Team	Constructor	Qualifying times		Final grid	Row
Pos.	No.	Biker	Team	Constructor	P1	P2	Final grid	Row
1	94	(Italy) Guido Pini	Liqui Moly Dynavolt Intact GP	KTM	Qualified in Q2	2:05.019	1	1
2	99	(Spain) José Antonio Rueda	Red Bull KTM Ajo	KTM	Qualified in Q2	2:05.045	2	1
3	64	(Spain) David Muñoz	Liqui Moly Dynavolt Intact GP	KTM	Qualified in Q2	2:05.057	3	1
4	22	(Spain) David Almansa	Leopard Racing	Honda	Qualified in Q2	2:05.091	4	2
5	28	(Spain) Máximo Quiles	CFMoto Inde Aspar Team	KTM	Qualified in Q2	2:05.175	5	2
6	71	(Italy) Dennis Foggia	CFMoto Inde Aspar Team	KTM	Qualified in Q2	2:05.188	6	2
7	73	(Argentina) Valentín Perrone	Red Bull KTM Tech3	KTM	Qualified in Q2	2:05.270	7	3
8	31	(Spain) Adrián Fernández	Leopard Racing	Honda	Qualified in Q2	2:05.394	8	3
9	95	(Argentina) Marco Morelli	Denssi Racing – BOE	KTM	2:05.892	2:05.576	9	3
10	36	(Spain) Ángel Piqueras	Frinsa – MT Helmets – MSI	KTM	2:05.384	2:05.601	10	4
11	89	(Spain) Marcos Uriarte	LEVELUP-MTA	KTM	2:05.843	2:05.630	11	4
12	19	(United Kingdom) Scott Ogden	CIP Green Power	KTM	Qualified in Q2	2:05.855	12	4
13	10	(Italy) Nicola Carraro	Rivacold Snipers Team	Honda	Qualified in Q2	2:05.937	13	5
14	83	(Spain) Álvaro Carpe	Red Bull KTM Ajo	KTM	Qualified in Q2	2:06.132	14	5
15	55	(Switzerland) Noah Dettwiler	CIP Green Power	KTM	2:05.902	2:06.259	15	5
16	12	(Australia) Jacob Roulstone	Red Bull KTM Tech3	KTM	Qualified in Q2	2:06.554	16	6
17	6	(Japan) Ryusei Yamanaka	Frinsa – MT Helmets – MSI	KTM	Qualified in Q2	No time set	17	6
18	66	(Australia) Joel Kelso	LEVELUP-MTA	KTM	Qualified in Q2	No time set	18	6
19	82	(Italy) Stefano Nepa	Sic58 Squadra Corse	Honda	2:05.969	N/A	19	7
20	72	(Japan) Taiyo Furusato	Honda Team Asia	Honda	2:05.990	N/A	20	7
21	54	(Italy) Riccardo Rossi	Rivacold Snipers Team	Honda	2:06.037	N/A	21	7
22	8	(United Kingdom) Eddie O'Shea	GRYD - Mlav Racing	Honda	2:06.275	N/A	22	8
23	25	(Italy) Leonardo Abruzzo	GRYD - Mlav Racing	Honda	2:06.685	N/A	23	8
24	48	(Switzerland) Lennox Phommara	Sic58 Squadra Corse	Honda	2:07.143	N/A	24	8
OFFICIAL MOTO3 QUALIFYING TIMES REPORT

- Cormac Buchanan miss the Qualifying due to crash at practice session.

== MotoGP Sprint ==
The MotoGP Sprint was held on 19 July 2025.

Pos.	No.	Rider	Team	Manufacturer	Laps	Time/Retired	Grid	Points
1	93	(Spain) Marc Márquez	Ducati Lenovo Team	Ducati	10	19:05.883	2	12
2	37	(Spain) Pedro Acosta	Red Bull KTM Factory Racing	KTM	10	+0.798	7	9
3	23	(Italy) Enea Bastianini	Red Bull KTM Tech3	KTM	10	+1.324	11	7
4	72	(Italy) Marco Bezzecchi	Aprilia Racing	Aprilia	10	+1.409	4	6
5	20	(France) Fabio Quartararo	Monster Energy Yamaha MotoGP Team	Yamaha	10	+2.292	3	5
6	25	(Spain) Raúl Fernández	Trackhouse MotoGP Team	Aprilia	10	+3.358	6	4
7	63	(Italy) Francesco Bagnaia	Ducati Lenovo Team	Ducati	10	+3.648	1	3
8	5	(France) Johann Zarco	Castrol Honda LCR	Honda	10	+3.920	9	2
9	44	(Spain) Pol Espargaró	Red Bull KTM Tech3	KTM	10	+4.748	14	1
10	33	(South Africa) Brad Binder	Red Bull KTM Factory Racing	KTM	10	+5.902	19	
11	1	(Spain) Jorge Martín	Aprilia Racing	Aprilia	10	+6.000	12	
12	43	(Australia) Jack Miller	Prima Pramac Yamaha MotoGP	Yamaha	10	+6.379	10	
13	88	(Portugal) Miguel Oliveira	Prima Pramac Yamaha MotoGP	Yamaha	10	+7.081	17	
14	54	(Spain) Fermín Aldeguer	BK8 Gresini Racing MotoGP	Ducati	10	+7.612	18	
15	10	(Italy) Luca Marini	Honda HRC Castrol	Honda	10	+8.681	16	
16	79	(Japan) Ai Ogura	Trackhouse MotoGP Team	Aprilia	10	+8.992	21	
17	73	(Spain) Álex Márquez	BK8 Gresini Racing MotoGP	Ducati	10	+9.871	8	
18	42	(Spain) Álex Rins	Monster Energy Yamaha MotoGP Team	Yamaha	10	+9.871	15	
19	36	(Spain) Joan Mir	Honda HRC Castrol	Honda	10	+11.487	5	
Ret	49	(Italy) Fabio Di Giannantonio	Pertamina Enduro VR46 Racing Team	Ducati	4	Crashed out	13	
Ret	30	(Japan) Takaaki Nakagami	IDEMITSU Honda LCR	Honda	1	Accident	20	
Ret	7	(Spain) Augusto Fernández	Yamaha Factory Racing Team	Yamaha	1	Accident	22	
Fastest sprint lap: (Spain) Marc Márquez (Ducati) – 1:53.243 (on lap 4)
OFFICIAL MOTOGP SPRINT REPORT

== Warm Up ==
=== Warm Up MotoGP ===
Fastest session lap

Pos.	No.	Biker	Team	Constructor	
Pos.	No.	Biker	Team	Constructor	Time results
1	93	(Spain) Marc Márquez	Ducati Lenovo Team	Ducati	1:53.634
2	72	(Italy) Marco Bezzecchi	Aprilia Racing	Aprilia	1:53.656
3	73	(Spain) Álex Márquez	BK8 Gresini Racing MotoGP	Ducati	1:53.735
4	20	(France) Fabio Quartararo	Monster Energy Yamaha MotoGP Team	Yamaha	1:53.766
5	88	(Portugal) Miguel Oliveira	Prima Pramac Yamaha MotoGP	Yamaha	1:53.827
6	79	(Japan) Ai Ogura	Trackhouse MotoGP Team	Aprilia	1:53.902
7	33	(South Africa) Brad Binder	Red Bull KTM Factory Racing	KTM	1:53.927
8	23	(Italy) Enea Bastianini	Red Bull KTM Tech3	KTM	1:53.937
9	36	(Spain) Joan Mir	Honda HRC Castrol	Honda	1:53.987
10	44	(Spain) Pol Espargaró	Red Bull KTM Tech3	KTM	1:54.030
11	25	(Spain) Raúl Fernández	Trackhouse MotoGP Team	Aprilia	1:54.067
12	5	(France) Johann Zarco	CASTROL Honda LCR	Honda	1:54.103
13	7	(Spain) Augusto Fernández	Yamaha Factory Racing Team	Yamaha	1:54.152
14	63	(Italy) Francesco Bagnaia	Ducati Lenovo Team	Ducati	1:54.185
15	54	(Spain) Fermín Aldeguer	BK8 Gresini Racing MotoGP	Ducati	1:54.255
16	43	(Australia) Jack Miller	Prima Pramac Yamaha MotoGP	Yamaha	1:54.290
17	49	(Italy) Fabio Di Giannantonio	Pertamina Enduro VR46 Racing Team	Ducati	1:54.346
18	42	(Spain) Álex Rins	Monster Energy Yamaha MotoGP Team	Yamaha	1:54.377
19	1	(Spain) Jorge Martín	Aprilia Racing	Aprilia	1:54.382
20	37	(Spain) Pedro Acosta	Red Bull KTM Factory Racing	KTM	1:54.520
21	10	(Italy) Luca Marini	Honda HRC Castrol	Honda	1:54.694
OFFICIAL MOTOGP WARM UP TIMES REPORT

== Race ==
=== MotoGP ===
Pos.	No.	Rider	Team	Manufacturer	Laps	Time/Retired	Grid	Points
1	93	(Spain) Marc Márquez	Ducati Lenovo Team	Ducati	21	41:04.628	2	25
2	72	(Italy) Marco Bezzecchi	Aprilia Racing	Aprilia	21	+1.753	4	20
3	37	(Spain) Pedro Acosta	Red Bull KTM Factory Racing	KTM	21	+3.366	7	16
4	63	(Italy) Francesco Bagnaia	Ducati Lenovo Team	Ducati	21	+3.879	1	13
5	25	(Spain) Raúl Fernández	Trackhouse MotoGP Team	Aprilia	21	+10.045	6	11
6	20	(France) Fabio Quartararo	Monster Energy Yamaha MotoGP Team	Yamaha	21	+11.039	3	10
7	1	(Spain) Jorge Martín	Aprilia Racing	Aprilia	21	+15.820	12	9
8	33	(South Africa) Brad Binder	Red Bull KTM Factory Racing	KTM	21	+17.371	19	8
9	44	(Spain) Pol Espargaró	Red Bull KTM Tech3	KTM	21	+18.163	14	7
10	43	(Australia) Jack Miller	Prima Pramac Yamaha MotoGP	Yamaha	21	+18.669	10	6
11	54	(Spain) Fermín Aldeguer	BK8 Gresini Racing MotoGP	Ducati	21	+19.781	18	5
12	10	(Italy) Luca Marini	Honda HRC Castrol	Honda	21	+20.778	16	4
13	5	(France) Johann Zarco	LCR Honda Castrol	Honda	21	+20.961	9	3
14	79	(Japan) Ai Ogura	Trackhouse MotoGP Team	Aprilia	21	+21.904	21	2
15	42	(Spain) Álex Rins	Monster Energy Yamaha MotoGP Team	Yamaha	21	+22.563	15	1
16	49	(Italy) Fabio Di Giannantonio	Pertamina Enduro VR46 Racing Team	Ducati	21	+24.729	13	
17	88	(Portugal) Miguel Oliveira	Prima Pramac Yamaha MotoGP	Yamaha	21	+27.640	17	
18	7	(Spain) Augusto Fernández	Yamaha Factory Racing	Yamaha	21	+28.310	22	
Ret	23	(Italy) Enea Bastianini	Red Bull KTM Tech3	KTM	5	Crashed out	11	
Ret	73	(Spain) Álex Márquez	BK8 Gresini Racing MotoGP	Ducati	1	Collision	8	
Ret	36	(Spain) Joan Mir	Honda HRC Castrol	Honda	1	Collision	5	
Fastest lap: (Spain) Marc Márquez (Ducati) – 1:53.691 (lap 15)
OFFICIAL MOTOGP RACE REPORT

=== Moto2 ===
Pos.	No.	Rider	Team	Manufacturer	Laps	Time/Retired	Grid	Points
1	16	(United States) Joe Roberts	OnlyFans American Racing Team	Kalex	18	36:03.441	2	25
2	7	(Belgium) Barry Baltus	Fantic Racing Lino Sonego	Kalex	18	+1.079	1	20
3	18	(Spain) Manuel González	Liqui Moly Dynavolt Intact GP	Kalex	18	+3.625	4	16
4	27	(Spain) Daniel Holgado	CFMoto Inde Aspar Team	Kalex	18	+7.365	5	13
5	13	(Italy) Celestino Vietti	Sync SpeedRS Team	Boscoscuro	18	+7.494	11	11
6	28	(Spain) Izan Guevara	Blu Cru Pramac Yamaha Moto2	Boscoscuro	18	+9.467	12	10
7	24	(Spain) Marcos Ramírez	OnlyFans American Racing Team	Kalex	18	+10.112	3	9
8	12	(Czech Republic) Filip Salač	Elf Marc VDS Racing Team	Boscoscuro	18	+11.193	9	8
9	80	(Colombia) David Alonso	CFMoto Inde Aspar Team	Kalex	18	+14.736	20	7
10	75	(Spain) Albert Arenas	Italjet Gresini Moto2	Kalex	18	+16.214	17	6
11	96	(United Kingdom) Jake Dixon	Elf Marc VDS Racing Team	Boscoscuro	18	+16.482	7	5
12	4	(Spain) Iván Ortolá	QJMotor – Frinsa – MSi	Boscoscuro	18	+17.409	14	4
13	53	(Turkey) Deniz Öncü	Red Bull KTM Ajo	Kalex	18	+17.451	21	3
14	99	(Spain) Adrián Huertas	Italtrans Racing Team	Kalex	18	+18.872	25	2
15	81	(Australia) Senna Agius	Liqui Moly Dynavolt Intact GP	Kalex	18	+19.652	6	1
16	95	(Netherlands) Collin Veijer	Red Bull KTM Ajo	Kalex	18	+21.754	16	
17	15	(South Africa) Darryn Binder	Italjet Gresini Moto2	Kalex	18	+22.285	24	
18	21	(Spain) Alonso López	Sync SpeedRS Team	Boscoscuro	18	+23.112	10	
19	14	(Italy) Tony Arbolino	Blu Cru Pramac Yamaha Moto2	Boscoscuro	18	+23.592	19	
20	84	(Netherlands) Zonta van den Goorbergh	RW-Idrofoglia Racing GP	Kalex	18	+25.786	15	
21	11	(Spain) Alex Escrig	Klint Forward Factory Team	Forward	18	+25.854	22	
22	9	(Spain) Jorge Navarro	Klint Forward Factory Team	Forward	18	+29.101	13	
23	92	(Japan) Yuki Kunii	Idemitsu Honda Team Asia	Kalex	18	+29.662	27	
24	23	(Japan) Taiga Hada	Idemitsu Honda Team Asia	Kalex	18	+48.129	26	
25	61	(Spain) Eric Fernández	QJMotor – Frinsa – MSi	Boscoscuro	18	+1:06.657	28	
Ret	71	(Japan) Ayumu Sasaki	RW-Idrofoglia Racing GP	Kalex	17	Crashed out	23	
Ret	40	(Poland) Milan Pawelec	AGR Team Fusport	Kalex	14	Collision	29	
Ret	10	(Brazil) Diogo Moreira	Italtrans Racing Team	Kalex	5	Entering pit	PL	
Ret	54	(Italy) Mattia Pasini	Fantic Racing Redemption	Kalex	5	Crashed out	8	
Ret	44	(Spain) Arón Canet	Fantic Racing Lino Sonego	Kalex	4	Crashed out	18	
Fastest lap: (United States) Joe Roberts (Kalex) - 1:59.468 (lap 10)
OFFICIAL MOTO2 RACE REPORT

=== Moto3 ===
Pos.	No.	Rider	Team	Manufacturer	Laps	Time/Retired	Grid	Points
1	99	(Spain) José Antonio Rueda	Red Bull KTM Ajo	KTM	16	33:40.677	2	25
2	28	(Spain) Máximo Quiles	CFMoto Inde Aspar Team	KTM	16	+3.471	4	20
3	64	(Spain) David Muñoz	Liqui Moly Dynavolt Intact GP	KTM	16	+3.495	23 (Note: Starting the race from the back of the grid)	16
4	36	(Spain) Ángel Piqueras	Frinsa – MT Helmets – MSI	KTM	16	+3.559	9	13
5	71	(Italy) Dennis Foggia	CFMoto Inde Aspar Team	KTM	16	+3.689	5	11
6	31	(Spain) Adrián Fernández	Leopard Racing	Honda	16	+3.867	7	10
7	22	(Spain) David Almansa	Leopard Racing	Honda	16	+4.420	3	9
8	73	(Argentina) Valentín Perrone	Red Bull KTM Tech3	KTM	16	+5.579	6	8
9	6	(Japan) Ryusei Yamanaka	Frinsa – MT Helmets – MSI	KTM	16	+5.597	16	7
10	94	(Italy) Guido Pini	Liqui Moly Dynavolt Intact GP	KTM	16	+5.985	1	6
11	89	(Spain) Marcos Uriarte	LEVELUP-MTA	KTM	16	+6.459	10	5
12	83	(Spain) Álvaro Carpe	Red Bull KTM Ajo	KTM	16	+10.711	13	4
13	95	(Argentina) Marco Morelli	Denssi Racing – BOE	KTM	16	+10.779	8	3
14	12	(Australia) Jacob Roulstone	Red Bull KTM Tech3	KTM	16	+10.817	15	2
15	19	(United Kingdom) Scott Ogden	CIP Green Power	KTM	16	+10.866	11	1
16	72	(Japan) Taiyo Furusato	Honda Team Asia	Honda	16	+12.088 (Note: 6 seconds penalty due to irresponsible riding - insufficient time to complete double long lap penalty)	18	
17	82	(Italy) Stefano Nepa	Sic58 Squadra Corse	Honda	16	+27.274	17	
18	8	(United Kingdom) Eddie O'Shea	GRYD - Mlav Racing	Honda	16	+27.275	20	
19	55	(Switzerland) Noah Dettwiler	CIP Green Power	KTM	16	+27.281	14	
20	25	(Italy) Leonardo Abruzzo	GRYD - Mlav Racing	Honda	16	+53.032	21	
Ret	10	(Italy) Nicola Carraro	Rivacold Snipers Team	Honda	15	Crashed out	12	
Ret	48	(Switzerland) Lenoxx Phommara	Sic58 Squadra Corse	Honda	5	Crashed out	22	
Ret	54	(Italy) Riccardo Rossi	Rivacold Snipers Team	Honda	4	Crashed out	19	
Fastest lap: (Spain) José Antonio Rueda (Honda) - 2:05.454 (lap 12)
OFFICIAL MOTO3 RACE REPORT

== Championship standings after the race ==
Below are the standings for the top five riders, constructors, and teams after the round.

=== MotoGP ===
Riders' Championship standings

	Pos.	Rider	Points
	1	(Spain) Marc Márquez	381
	2	(Spain) Álex Márquez	261
	3	(Italy) Francesco Bagnaia	213
2	4	(Italy) Marco Bezzecchi	156
1	5	(Italy) Fabio Di Giannantonio	142

Constructors' Championship standings

Pos.	Constructor	Points
1	(Italy) Ducati	430
2	(Italy) Aprilia	187
3	(Austria) KTM	175
4	(Japan) Honda	147
5	(Japan) Yamaha	133

Teams' Championship standings

Pos.	Team	Points
1	(Italy) Ducati Lenovo Team	594
2	(Italy) BK8 Gresini Racing MotoGP	358
3	(Italy) Pertamina Enduro VR46 Racing Team	281
4	(Austria) Red Bull KTM Factory Racing	192
5	(Italy) Aprilia Racing	173

=== Moto2 ===
Riders' Championship standings

	Pos.	Rider	Points
	1	(Spain) Manuel González	188
	2	(Spain) Arón Canet	163
2	3	(Belgium) Barry Baltus	134
1	4	(Brazil) Diogo Moreira	128
1	5	(United Kingdom) Jake Dixon	119

Constructors' Championship standings

Pos.	Constructor	Points
1	(Germany) Kalex	283
2	(Italy) Boscoscuro	161
3	(Switzerland) Forward	13

Teams' Championship standings

	Pos.	Team	Points
	1	(Italy) Fantic Racing Lino Sonego	297
	2	(Germany) Liqui Moly Dynavolt Intact GP	281
	3	(Belgium) Elf Marc VDS Racing Team	185
2	4	(United States) OnlyFans American Racing Team	160
1	5	(Italy) Sync SpeedRS Team	148

=== Moto3 ===
Riders' Championship standings

	Pos.	Rider	Points
	1	(Spain) José Antonio Rueda	228
	2	(Spain) Ángel Piqueras	143
	3	(Spain) Álvaro Carpe	133
2	4	(Spain) Máximo Quiles	126
	5	(Spain) David Muñoz	123

Constructors' Championship standings

Pos.	Constructor	Points
1	(Austria) KTM	300
2	(Japan) Honda	149

Teams' Championship standings

	Pos.	Team	Points
	1	(Finland) Red Bull KTM Ajo	361
	2	(Spain) Frinsa – MT Helmets – MSi	211
1	3	(Spain) CFMoto Gaviota Aspar Team	199
1	4	(Italy) LevelUp – MTA	174
	5	(Germany) Liqui Moly Dynavolt Intact GP	167

== Notes ==
Previous race: 2025 German Grand Prix	FIM Grand Prix World Championship; 2025 season	Next race: 2025 Austrian Grand Prix
Previous race: 2020 Czech Republic Grand Prix	Czech motorcycle Grand Prix	Next race: 2026 Czech Grand Prix
