= Enzo Boulom =

French motorcycle racer

- Nationality: French
- Born: 29 January 1997 (age 29); Laon, France
- Current team: TCP Racing
- Bike number: 25
Motorcycle racing career statistics
Moto3 World Championship
Active years	2016
Manufacturers	KTM, Mahindra
2016 championship position	NC (0 pts)
Starts / Wins / Podiums / Poles / F. laps / Points; 3 / 0 / 0 / 0 / 0 / 0

Enzo Boulom (born 29 January 1997) is a French motorcycle racer. He currently competes in the French Supersport Championship aboard a Yamaha YZF-R6. Boulom has been a competitor in the FIM CEV Moto3 Junior World Championship, the French 125cc/Moto3 Championship, and the Red Bull MotoGP Rookies Cup in 2014 and 2015.

== Career statistics ==
=== Red Bull MotoGP Rookies Cup ===
==== Races by year ====
(key) (Races in bold indicate pole position, races in italics indicate fastest lap)

Year	1	2	3	4	5	6	7	8	9	10	11	12	13	14	Pos	Pts
2014	JER1; 16	JER1; 15	MUG; 14	ASS1; Ret	ASS2; 19	SAC1; 13	SAC2; 14	BRN1; 10	BRN2; 6	SIL1; 15	SIL2; Ret	MIS; 10	ARA1; 14	ARA2; 11	15th	38
2015	JER1; 8	JER2; 5	ASS1; 4	ASS2; 4	SAC1; 9	SAC2; 6	BRN1; 8	BRN2; 4	SIL1; 6	SIL2; 2	MIS; 7	ARA1; DNS	ARA2; 10		6th	128

=== FIM CEV Moto3 Junior World Championship ===
==== Races by year ====
(key) (Races in bold indicate pole position, races in italics indicate fastest lap)

Year	Bike	1	2	3	4	5	6	7	8	9	10	11	12	Pos	Pts
2014	Honda	JER1	JER2	LMS; DNS	ARA	CAT1	CAT2	ALB	NAV	ALG	VAL1; Ret	VAL2; 26		NC	0
2015	Mahindra	ALG	LMS; 12	CAT1	CAT2	ARA1; Ret	ARA2; 10	ALB	NAV	JER1	JER2	VAL1	VAL2	26th	12
2015	Suter	ALG	LMS	CAT1; 14	CAT2; Ret	ARA1	ARA2	ALB	NAV; 17	JER1; DNS	JER2; DNS	VAL1	VAL2	26th	12
2015	FTR Honda	ALG	LMS	CAT1	CAT2	ARA1	ARA2	ALB	NAV	JER1	JER2	VAL1; Ret	VAL2; 23	26th	12
2016	KTM	VAL1; 14	VAL2; 14	LMS; 12	ARA; 23	CAT1; 16	CAT2; 17	ALB; 13	ALG; 11	JER1	JER2	VAL1	VAL2	22nd	16
2016	Mahindra	VAL1	VAL2	LMS	ARA	CAT1	CAT2	ALB	ALG	JER1	JER2	VAL1; 16	VAL2; 19	22nd	16

=== FIM CEV Moto2 Championship ===
==== Races by year ====
(key) (Races in bold indicate pole position) (Races in italics indicate fastest lap)

Year	Bike	1	2	3	4	5	6	7	8	9	10	11	Pos	Pts
2018	Transfiormers	EST1	EST2	VAL	CAT1; DNS	CAT2; DNS	ARA1	ARA2	JER	ALB1	ALB2	VAL	NC	0

=== Grand Prix motorcycle racing ===
==== By season ====
Season	Class	Motorcycle	Team	Race	Win	Podium	Pole	FLap	Pts	Plcd
2016	Moto3	KTM	Procercasa – 42 Motorsport	3	0	0	0	0	0	NC
2016	Moto3	Mahindra	CIP-Unicom Starker	3	0	0	0	0	0	NC
Total				**3**	**0**	**0**	**0**	**0**	**0**	

==== Races by year ====
Year	Class	Bike	1	2	3	4	5	6	7	8	9	10	11	12	13	14	15	16	17	18	Pos.	Pts
2016	Moto3	KTM	QAT	ARG	AME	SPA; 22	FRA; Ret	ITA	CAT	NED	GER	AUT	CZE	GBR	RSM	ARA	JPN	AUS	MAL		NC	0
2016	Moto3	Mahindra																		VAL; 30	NC	0

=== FIM Endurance World Championship ===
Year	Team	Bike	Tyre	Rider	Pts	TC
2025	Team LRP Poland	BMW S1000RR	**D**	(United Kingdom) Michael Dunlop (France) Enzo Boulom (United Kingdom) Danny Webb	6*	17th*
