= Rory Skinner =

British motorcycle racer (born 2001)

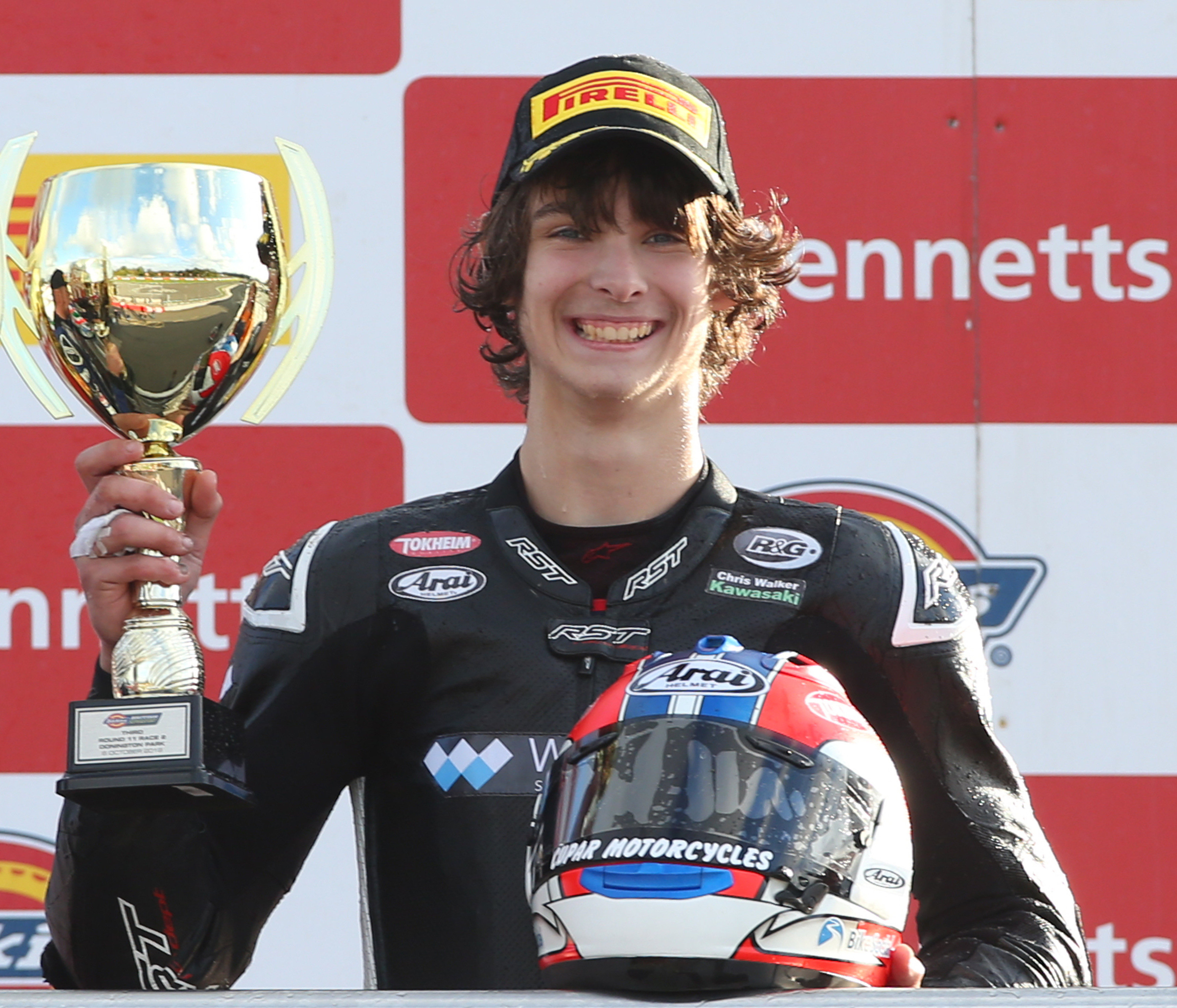
- Skinner at Donington Park on 6 October 2019
- Nationality: British
- Born: 27 September 2001 (age 25); Perth, Scotland, United Kingdom
- Current team: Cheshire Mouldings TAS Racing
- Bike number: 11
- Website: Official website
Motorcycle racing career statistics
Moto2 World Championship
Active years	2022–2023
Manufacturers	Kalex
2023 championship position	28th (2 pts)
Starts / Wins / Podiums / Poles / F. laps / Points; 18 / 0 / 0 / 0 / 0 / 2
British Superbike Championship
Active years	2021–2022, 2024–present
Manufacturers	BMW, Ducati, Kawasaki, Yamaha
Championships	0
2026 championship position	7th (269 points)
Starts / Wins / Podiums / Poles / F. laps / Points; 131 / 3 / 20 / 3 / 4 / 1832
British Supersport Championship
Active years	2019–2020
Manufacturers	Kawasaki, Yamaha
Championships	1 (2020)
2020 championship position	1st (270 pts)
Starts / Wins / Podiums / Poles / F. laps / Points; 36 / 10 / 12 / 6 / 6 / 447

Rory Skinner (born 27 September 2001) is a British motorcycle racer from Perth, Scotland, competing in the 2026 British Superbike Championship with TAS Racing. He is best known for winning the 2020 British Supersport Championship, and was the inaugural champion of the British Talent Cup. Skinner is managed by former MotoGP rider John Hopkins, and has also worked as a motorcycle mechanic prior to his racing career.

Skinner is a former race winner in the Red Bull MotoGP Rookies Cup, as well as the 2014 Dunlop Aprilia Superteens Champion and a multiple mini-moto champion. After the 2019 season in British Supersport on a Kawasaki, for 2020, he moved to Appleyard Yamaha racing. Skinner dominated the 2020 British Supersport Championship, winning the first six races, and was crowned champion after his eighth victory of the season.

For 2021 and 2022, Skinner moved into the British Superbike Championship (BSB). He missed the last two 2022 rounds due to a hand injury sustained when he crashed into the back of another rider in late September. For 2023, Skinner was contracted to race in the Moto2 world championship with American Racing Team, but had a disappointing season, only scoring points once in the 17 races he participated in that year. He was not retained, and returned to racing in British Superbikes.

== Career ==
=== Red Bull MotoGP Rookies Cup ===
On 17 October 2014, the then 13-year-old Skinner was selected as the only British rider to compete in the 2015 Red Bull MotoGP Rookies Cup, following the selection event at the Guadix circuit in Spain.

Skinner ended his debut season in the championship in 10th position, with his best results coming at the final round in Aragon, Spain. On the weekend of his 14th birthday, Skinner qualified on pole position and took third place in each of the two races. It was also confirmed that he would continue in the championship in 2016.

Despite missing the first round of the 2016 championship through injury, Skinner moved up to sixth in the overall standings - scoring third place podium finishes at Assen and Aragon.

Skinner took his first and only Rookies win in the opening race of the 2017 season at Jerez. It was his only podium finish of the season and he slipped back to 12th in the final standings.

At the end of 2017, it was confirmed that Skinner was leaving the Red Bull MotoGP Rookies Cup, having competed in the maximum three seasons allowed under the rules.

=== FIM CEV Moto3 Junior World Championship ===
As well as competing in the Red Bull Rookies MotoGP Cup, Skinner raced in the FIM CEV Moto3 Junior World Championship for the KRP team, as part of the Racing Steps Foundation programme.

Riding a KTM motorcycle, Skinner scored a best result of fifth and finished 13th in the 2017 FIM CEV Moto3 Junior World Championship.

=== British Talent Cup ===
With his time in the Red Bull Rookies complete and Racing Steps Foundation closing its doors, Skinner found himself without a ride for 2018. He was handed a lifeline when Dorna offered him a place in the inaugural British Talent Cup, despite him not having officially applied to join the series. Skinner was fastest in the pre-season test at the Valencia circuit in Spain, and took his first win at the second round in Donington Park.

On 17 November 2018 Skinner became the inaugural British Talent Cup champion at the Valencia circuit in Spain.

=== British Supersport Championship ===
For 2019, British Superbike Championship veteran Chris Walker provided Skinner with a Kawasaki ZX-6R for his privateer campaign. In a team run by his father Mike, the 18-year-old finished the season seventh overall, making him the top ranked rookie and best placed Kawasaki rider. His best result was a third place at Donington Park.

For 2020, Skinner was signed by former Grand Prix racer Robin Appleyard to ride a Yamaha R6, and he dominated the championship. He won the first six races in a row, and secured the championship with two races to spare at Donington Park on 4 October 2020, becoming the series' youngest ever champion at 19 years and seven days old.

=== British Superbike Championship ===
On 28 November 2020, it was announced that Skinner would move up to the British Superbike Championship in 2021, riding for the FS-3 Kawasaki team. In July, Skinner recorded his first podium finishes when twice finishing runner-up at Knockhill.

In 2022 season, Skinner was the third rider to qualify for the end of season 'Showdown' and, at 20 years old, the youngest Title Fighter in the championship's history. He was unable to challenge for the title due to injuries and missed the last two rounds with a broken hand sustained when he crashed into the back of another rider at Oulton Park.

Following Moto2 in 2023, for 2024 Skinner joined with TAS Racing having an unproductive, broken season, suffering crash injuries in May and again, more seriously, in July. Despite this, he took his first win in BSB, at Knockhill in June and for 2025, he signed to remain with TAS Racing, but switching from BMW to Ducati.

=== Moto2 World Championship ===
==== 2022 ====
In 2022, Skinner had two wildcard rides in the Moto2 world championship, organised by John Hopkins with his American Racing team.

==== American Racing Team (2023) ====
In October 2022, Skinner signed to race in the Moto2 world championship for the American Racing team during 2023 and 2024. In late 2023, his contract was terminated with Marcos Ramírez announced as replacement rider.

== Career statistics ==
=== Red Bull MotoGP Rookies Cup ===
==== Races by year ====
(key) (Races in bold indicate pole position; races in italics indicate fastest lap)

Year	1	2	3	4	5	6	7	8	9	10	11	12	13	Pos	Pts
2015	JER1; 17	JER2; 17	ASS1; 15	ASS2; 14	SAC1; 18	SAC2; 11	BRN1; Ret	BRN2; 14	SIL1; 10	SIL2; 4	MIS; 16	**ARA1**; 3	**ARA2**; 3	10th	61
2016	JER1	JER2	ASS1; Ret	ASS2; 3	SAC1; 9	SAC2; 7	RBR1; 8	RBR2; 9	BRN1; 7	BRN2; 4	MIS; 6	ARA1; 3	ARA2; 8	6th	103
2017	JER1; 1	JER2; Ret	ASS1; 5	ASS2; 9	SAC1; 17	SAC2; 15	BRN1; 12	BRN2; Ret	RBR1; Ret	RBR2; 9	MIS; 13	ARA1; 9	ARA2; 7	12th	74

=== FIM CEV Moto3 Junior World Championship ===
==== Races by year ====
(key) (Races in bold indicate pole position, races in italics indicate fastest lap)

Year	Bike	1	2	3	4	5	6	7	8	9	10	11	12	Pos	Pts
2015	FTR KTM	ALG	LMS	CAT1	CAT2	ARA1	ARA2	ALB	NAV; Ret	JER1; 15	JER2; 12	VAL1; 7	VAL2; 5	19th	25
2016	FTR KTM	VAL1; Ret	VAL2; Ret	LMS	ARA; 28	CAT1; 15	CAT2; DNS	ALB; 19	ALG; Ret	JER1; Ret	JER2; DNS	VAL1; 27	VAL2; 9	28th	8
2017	KTM	ALB; 9	LMS; 10	CAT1; 15	CAT2; 5	VAL1; Ret	VAL2; 17	EST	JER1; 18	JER1; 5	ARA; 16	VAL1; 14	VAL2; 13	13th	41

=== British Supersport Championship ===
==== Races by year ====
(key) (Races in bold indicate pole position; races in italics indicate fastest lap)

Year	Bike	1		2		3		4		5		6		7		8		9		10		11		12		Pos	Pts
Year	Bike	R1	R2	R1	R2	R1	R2	R1	R2	R1	R2	R1	R2	R1	R2	R1	R2	R1	R2	R1	R2	R1	R2	R1	R2	Pos	Pts
2019	Kawasaki	SIL; 9	SIL; EX	OUL; 9	OUL; Ret	DON; 5	DON; 5	BRH; Ret	BRH; 9	KNO; 5	KNO; Ret	SNE; 9	SNE; 8	THR; 7	THR; 9	CAD; Ret	CAD; 6	OUL; 9	OUL; 6	ASS; 4	ASS; 4	DON; 16	DON; 3	BRH; 5	BRH; 4	7th	177
2020	Yamaha	**DON**; 1	**DON**; 1	**SNE**; 1	SNE; 1	**SIL**; 1	**SIL**; 1	**OUL**; 2	OUL; 1	**DON**; Ret	DON; 1	**BRH**; 1	BRH; 1													1st	270**

^{**} Season limited to 12 races because of COVID-19 pandemic.

=== British Superbike Championship ===
(key) (Races in bold indicate pole position; races in italics indicate fastest lap)

Year	Bike	1			2			3			4			5			6			7			8				9			10			11			Pos	Pts
Year	Bike	R1	R2	R3	R1	R2	R3	R1	R2	R3	R1	R2	R3	R1	R2	R3	R1	R2	R3	R1	R2	R3	R1	R2	R3	R4	R1	R2	R3	R1	R2	R3	R1	R2	R3	Pos	Pts
2021	Kawasaki	OUL; 13	OUL; 12	OUL; 13	KNO; 5	KNO; 2	**KNO**; 2	BRH; 8	BRH; 6	BRH; 9	THR; 14	THR; 11	THR; Ret	DON; 17	DON; 14	DON; 11	CAD; 9	CAD; Ret	CAD; 12	SNE; 8	SNE; 9	SNE; 15	SIL; 7	SIL; 9	SIL; 16		OUL; 11	OUL; 11	OUL; 10	DON; 10	DON; Ret	DON; 12	BRH; Ret	BRH; Ret	BRH; 7	13th	178
2022	Kawasaki	SIL; 4	SIL; 3	SIL; 4	OUL; 2	OUL; 5	OUL; 4	DON; 7	DON; 8	DON; 4	KNO; 3	KNO; 3	**KNO**; Ret	BRH; 7	BRH; 6	BRH; 9	THR; 7	THR; 7	THR; 9	CAD; 2	CAD; 5	CAD; 5	SNE; DNS	SNE; 11	SNE; DNS		OUL; 8	OUL; DNS	OUL; DNS	DON	DON	DON	BRH	BRH	BRH	8th	1017
2024	BMW	NAV; 5	NAV; Ret		OUL; 8	OUL; DNS	OUL; DNS	DON; WD	DON; WD	DON; WD	KNO; 2	KNO; 1	KNO; 4	SNE; DNS	SNE; WD	SNE; WD	BRH	BRH	BRH	THR; DNS	THR; WD	THR; WD	CAD	CAD	CAD		OUL; 11	OUL; Ret	OUL; DNS	DON; 15	DON; 15	DON; 12	BRH; Ret	BRH; Ret	BRH; DNS	17th	76
2025	Ducati	OUL; 11	OUL; 11	OUL; C	DON; 5	DON; 4	DON; **3**	SNE; Ret	SNE; 2	SNE; 5	KNO; 3	KNO; 2	KNO; 1	BRH; 8	BRH; 6	BRH; 6	THR; 10	THR; 9	THR; 12	CAD; 9	CAD; 10	CAD; Ret	DON; 3	DON; 3	DON; 5	DON; 2	ASS; 14	ASS; 2	ASS; 8	OUL; WD	OUL; WD	OUL; WD	BRH; 4	BRH; Ret	BRH; Ret	7th	292
2026	Yamaha	OUL; 7	OUL; 8	OUL; 6	DON; 6	DON; 6	DON; 7	KNO; 5	KNO; Ret	KNO; 5	SNE; DNS	SNE; 4	SNE; 5	BRH; 9	BRH; 9	BRH; 7	OUL; Ret	OUL; 12	OUL; 7	THR; 2	THR; 6	THR; 5	CAD; 1	CAD; Ret	CAD; Ret		ASS; 6	ASS; DNS	ASS; 7	DON; Ret	DON; Ret	DON; 5	BRH; 6	BRH; 8	BRH; 19	7th	269

=== Grand Prix motorcycle racing ===
==== By season ====
Season	Class	Motorcycle	Team	Race	Win	Podium	Pole	FLap	Pts	Plcd
2022	Moto2	Kalex	American Racing	2	0	0	0	0	0	39th
2023	Moto2	Kalex	American Racing	16	0	0	0	0	2	28th
Total				**18**	**0**	**0**	**0**	**0**	**2**	

==== By class ====
Class	Seasons	1st GP	1st Pod	1st Win	Race	Win	Podiums	Pole	FLap	Pts	WChmp
Moto2	2022–2023	2022 Great Britain			18	0	0	0	0	2	0
Total	2022–2023				**18**	**0**	**0**	**0**	**0**	**2**	**0**

==== Races by year ====
(key) (Races in bold indicate pole position; races in italics indicate fastest lap)

Year	Class	Bike	1	2	3	4	5	6	7	8	9	10	11	12	13	14	15	16	17	18	19	20	Pos	Pts
2022	Moto2	Kalex	QAT	INA	ARG	AME	POR	SPA	FRA	ITA	CAT	GER	NED	GBR; 21	AUT; 21	RSM	ARA	JPN	THA	AUS	MAL	VAL	39th	0
2023	Moto2	Kalex	POR; 22	ARG; Ret	AME; 19	SPA; 24	FRA; Ret	ITA; DNS	GER	NED	GBR; Ret	AUT; 18	CAT; 23	RSM; Ret	IND; 20	JPN; 25	INA; 19	AUS; 12^{‡}	THA; 20	MAL; 20	QAT; 24	VAL; 21	28th	2

^{‡} Half points awarded as less than half of the race distance (but at least three full laps) was completed.
* Season still in progress.
