= Patrik Pulkkinen =

Finnish motorcycle racer

- Nationality: Finnish
- Born: 14 March 2001 (age 25); Helsinki, Finland
Motorcycle racing career statistics
Moto3 World Championship
Active years	2017
Manufacturers	Peugeot
2017 championship position	38th (0 pts)
Starts / Wins / Podiums / Poles / F. laps / Points; 18 / 0 / 0 / 0 / 0 / 0

Patrik Pulkkinen (born 14 March 2001) is a Finnish motorcycle racer. He raced in the 2017 Moto3 World Championship for Peugeot MC Saxoprint team. Pulkkinen was also a competitor in the Red Bull MotoGP Rookies Cup in 2015 and 2016.

== Career statistics ==
=== Red Bull MotoGP Rookies Cup ===
==== Races by year ====
(key)

Season	1	2	3	4	5	6	7	8	9	10	11	12	13	Pos.	Pts
2015	JER; 15	JER; 19	ASS; 12	ASS; 12	SAC; 16	SAC; 13	BRN; 12	BRN; Ret	SIL; 15	SIL; 13	MIS; 17	ARA; 10	ARA; 14	19th	28
2016	JER; 14	JER; 17	ASS; 11	ASS; 16	SAC; 15	SAC; 13	RBR; 7	RBR; 8	BRN; Ret	BRN; 5	MIS; 18	ARA; 8	ARA; 10	14th	53

=== FIM CEV Moto3 Junior World Championship ===
==== Races by year ====
(key) (Races in bold indicate pole position, races in italics indicate fastest lap)

Year	Bike	1	2	3	4	5	6	7	8	9	10	11	12	Pos	Pts
2015	KTM	ALG	LMS	CAT1; 16	CAT2; 23	ARA1	ARA2	ALB	NAV	JER1	JER2	VAL1	VAL2	NC	0

=== Grand Prix motorcycle racing ===
==== By season ====
Season	Class	Motorcycle	Team	Race	Win	Podium	Pole	FLap	Pts	Plcd
2017	Moto3	Peugeot	Peugeot MC Saxoprint	18	0	0	0	0	0	38th
Total				**18**	**0**	**0**	**0**	**0**	**0**	

==== Races by year ====
Year	Class	Bike	1	2	3	4	5	6	7	8	9	10	11	12	13	14	15	16	17	18	Pos.	Pts
2017	Moto3	Peugeot	QAT; Ret	ARG; 26	AME; 27	SPA; 26	FRA; 23	ITA; 27	CAT; 27	NED; 22	GER; 25	CZE; 30	AUT; 24	GBR; 24	RSM; Ret	ARA; 29	JPN; 22	AUS; Ret	MAL; 23	VAL; 29	38th	0
