= 2020 Czech Republic motorcycle Grand Prix =

2020 Czech Republic Grand Prix
Race details
- Race 4 of 15 races in the 2020 Grand Prix motorcycle racing season
- Date: 9 August 2020
- Official name: Monster Energy Grand Prix České republiky
- Location: Brno Circuit; Brno, Czech Republic
- Course: Permanent racing facility; 5.403 km (3.357 mi)

MotoGP
Pole position
Rider	(France) Johann Zarco	Ducati
Time	1:55.687	
Fastest lap
Rider	(South Africa) Brad Binder	KTM
Time	1:57.445 on lap 3	
Podium
First	(South Africa) Brad Binder	KTM
Second	(Italy) Franco Morbidelli	Yamaha
Third	(France) Johann Zarco	Ducati

Moto2
Pole position
Rider	(United States) Joe Roberts	Kalex
Time	2:01.692	
Fastest lap
Rider	(Italy) Enea Bastianini	Kalex
Time	2:02.763 on lap 2	
Podium
First	(Italy) Enea Bastianini	Kalex
Second	(United Kingdom) Sam Lowes	Kalex
Third	(United States) Joe Roberts	Kalex

Moto3
Pole position
Rider	(Spain) Raúl Fernández	KTM
Time	2:08.372	
Fastest lap
Rider	(Spain) Jaume Masiá	Honda
Time	2:08.885 on lap 2	
Podium
First	(Italy) Dennis Foggia	Honda
Second	(Spain) Albert Arenas	KTM
Third	(Japan) Ai Ogura	Honda

The 2020 Czech Republic motorcycle Grand Prix was the fourth round of the 2020 Grand Prix motorcycle racing season and the third round of the 2020 MotoGP World Championship. It was held at the Brno Circuit in Brno on 9 August 2020. Fabio Quartararo was the defending MotoGP race winner who aimed for his second consecutive Grand Prix win, having won the previous round.

In the MotoGP class, Brad Binder took his first victory in the premier class, the first for a South African rider, the first non-European rider to win since Australian Jack Miller in the 2016 Dutch TT, as well the first rookie to win a Grand Prix since Marc Márquez in 2013. With KTM's victory, this race marks the first time a non-Japanese and Italian constructor won a Grand Prix since German constructor König won the 1973 Yugoslavian Grand Prix. In addition, the KTM used the WP Suspension, which is marked the first non-Öhlins suspension to win a race since 2009 Valencian Grand Prix.

== Background ==
=== Impact of the COVID-19 pandemic ===
The opening rounds of the 2020 championship was heavily affected by the COVID-19 pandemic. Several Grands Prix were cancelled or postponed after the aborted opening round in Qatar, prompting the Fédération Internationale de Motocyclisme to draft a new calendar. However, the Czech Republic Grand Prix was not impacted by this change and kept its original date.

=== MotoGP Championship standings before the race ===
After the second round at the Andalusian Grand Prix, Fabio Quartararo on 50 points, leads the championship by ten points over Maverick Viñales, with Andrea Dovizioso a further 14 points behind. In Teams' Championship, Petronas Yamaha SRT with 61 points, lead the championship from Monster Energy Yamaha, who have 56. Ducati Team sit 23 points behind the factory Yamaha in third, and are only 11 points ahead of fourth-placed LCR Honda, who have 22 points, while Pramac Racing sit 5th on 22 points.

=== MotoGP Entrants ===
Stefan Bradl replaced Marc Márquez from the Czech Republic round onwards while he recovered from injuries sustained in his opening round crash.

== MotoGP Qualifying ==
=== Q1 ===
In Q1, Álex Rins set the fastest lap of the session with the factory KTM of Brad Binder 0.6 secs behind. Miguel Oliveira was 0.98 sec behind Rins.

=== Q2 ===
Quartararo initially set a lap of 1.55.990 during his first run. A few minutes later, Johann Zarco recorded a 1.55.687 to secure pole position, and Quartararo achieved second place after crashing on his final run, 0.303 seconds back. Franco Morbidelli was third fastest, 0.311 behind pole position. The rest of the top 10 were: Aleix Espargaró, Maverick Viñales, Pol Espargaró, Brad Binder, Danilo Petrucci, Joan Mir, Valentino Rossi.

This was the first pole position in MotoGP for Esponsorama Racing while being Zarco's 5th overall.

== Race ==
=== MotoGP ===
Pos.	No.	Rider	Team	Manufacturer	Laps	Time/Retired	Grid	Points
1	33	(South Africa) Brad Binder	Red Bull KTM Factory Racing	KTM	21	41:38.764	7	25
2	21	(Italy) Franco Morbidelli	Petronas Yamaha SRT	Yamaha	21	+5.266	3	20
3	5	(France) Johann Zarco	Esponsorama Racing	Ducati	21	+6.470	1	16
4	42	(Spain) Álex Rins	Team Suzuki Ecstar	Suzuki	21	+6.609	11	13
5	46	(Italy) Valentino Rossi	Monster Energy Yamaha MotoGP	Yamaha	21	+7.517	10	11
6	88	(Portugal) Miguel Oliveira	Red Bull KTM Tech3	KTM	21	+7.969	13	10
7	20	(France) Fabio Quartararo	Petronas Yamaha SRT	Yamaha	21	+11.827	2	9
8	30	(Japan) Takaaki Nakagami	LCR Honda Idemitsu	Honda	21	+12.862	17	8
9	43	(Australia) Jack Miller	Pramac Racing	Ducati	21	+15.013	14	7
10	41	(Spain) Aleix Espargaró	Aprilia Racing Team Gresini	Aprilia	21	+15.087	4	6
11	4	(Italy) Andrea Dovizioso	Ducati Team	Ducati	21	+16.455	18	5
12	9	(Italy) Danilo Petrucci	Ducati Team	Ducati	21	+18.506	8	4
13	35	(United Kingdom) Cal Crutchlow	LCR Honda Castrol	Honda	21	+18.736	12	3
14	12	(Spain) Maverick Viñales	Monster Energy Yamaha MotoGP	Yamaha	21	+19.720	5	2
15	73	(Spain) Álex Márquez	Repsol Honda Team	Honda	21	+24.597	21	1
16	53	(Spain) Tito Rabat	Esponsorama Racing	Ducati	21	+29.004	15	
17	38	(United Kingdom) Bradley Smith	Aprilia Racing Team Gresini	Aprilia	21	+32.290	19	
18	6	(Germany) Stefan Bradl	Repsol Honda Team	Honda	21	+55.977	20	
Ret	44	(Spain) Pol Espargaró	Red Bull KTM Factory Racing	KTM	9	Accident	6	
Ret	36	(Spain) Joan Mir	Team Suzuki Ecstar	Suzuki	3	Collision	9	
Ret	27	(Spain) Iker Lecuona	Red Bull KTM Tech3	KTM	3	Collision	16	
DNS	63	(Italy) Francesco Bagnaia	Pramac Racing	Ducati		Did not start		
Fastest lap: (South Africa) Brad Binder (KTM) – 1:57.445 (lap 3)
Sources:

- Francesco Bagnaia suffered a broken tibia in a crash during practice and withdrew from the event.

=== Moto2 ===
Pos.	No.	Rider	Manufacturer	Laps	Time/Retired	Grid	Points
1	33	(Italy) Enea Bastianini	Kalex	19	39:13.926	3	25
2	22	(United Kingdom) Sam Lowes	Kalex	19	+0.423	2	20
3	16	(United States) Joe Roberts	Kalex	19	+5.948	1	16
4	10	(Italy) Luca Marini	Kalex	19	+8.797	10	13
5	37	(Spain) Augusto Fernández	Kalex	19	+9.392	8	11
6	72	(Italy) Marco Bezzecchi	Kalex	19	+10.306	5	10
7	9	(Spain) Jorge Navarro	Speed Up	19	+10.575	11	9
8	88	(Spain) Jorge Martín	Kalex	19	+11.366	6	8
9	55	(Malaysia) Hafizh Syahrin	Speed Up	19	+12.875	4	7
10	44	(Spain) Arón Canet	Speed Up	19	+14.266	15	6
11	45	(Japan) Tetsuta Nagashima	Kalex	19	+15.378	20	5
12	97	(Spain) Xavi Vierge	Kalex	19	+19.031	12	4
13	87	(Australia) Remy Gardner	Kalex	19	+19.282	21	3
14	11	(Italy) Nicolò Bulega	Kalex	19	+19.598	19	2
15	23	(Germany) Marcel Schrötter	Kalex	19	+19.638	7	1
16	21	(Italy) Fabio Di Giannantonio	Speed Up	19	+22.245	9	
17	12	(Switzerland) Thomas Lüthi	Kalex	19	+24.406	25	
18	64	(Netherlands) Bo Bendsneyder	NTS	19	+25.065	17	
19	42	(Spain) Marcos Ramírez	Kalex	19	+25.170	16	
20	57	(Spain) Edgar Pons	Kalex	19	+26.727	26	
21	77	(Switzerland) Dominique Aegerter	NTS	19	+27.004	22	
22	7	(Italy) Lorenzo Baldassarri	Kalex	19	+29.986	18	
23	35	(Thailand) Somkiat Chantra	Kalex	19	+36.034	24	
24	19	(Italy) Lorenzo Dalla Porta	Kalex	19	+36.411	27	
25	27	(Indonesia) Andi Farid Izdihar	Kalex	19	+45.780	28	
Ret	62	(Italy) Stefano Manzi	MV Agusta	11	Accident	13	
Ret	96	(United Kingdom) Jake Dixon	Kalex	10	Rear Brakes	14	
Ret	40	(Spain) Héctor Garzó	Kalex	5	Accident	23	
Ret	99	(Malaysia) Kasma Daniel	Kalex	3	Accident	29	
DNS	24	(Italy) Simone Corsi	MV Agusta		Did not start		
OFFICIAL MOTO2 RACE REPORT

- Simone Corsi suffered a broken toe in a crash during warm-up and was declared unfit to start the race.

=== Moto3 ===
Pos.	No.	Rider	Manufacturer	Laps	Time/Retired	Grid	Points
1	7	(Italy) Dennis Foggia	Honda	18	39:06.370	5	25
2	75	(Spain) Albert Arenas	KTM	18	+0.205	7	20
3	79	(Japan) Ai Ogura	Honda	18	+0.251	4	16
4	23	(Italy) Niccolò Antonelli	Honda	18	+0.381	12	13
5	17	(United Kingdom) John McPhee	Honda	18	+0.509	18	11
6	25	(Spain) Raúl Fernández	KTM	18	+0.808	1	10
7	52	(Spain) Jeremy Alcoba	Honda	18	+0.889	6	9
8	14	(Italy) Tony Arbolino	Honda	18	+1.647	8	8
9	55	(Italy) Romano Fenati	Husqvarna	18	+1.648	9	7
10	82	(Italy) Stefano Nepa	KTM	18	+8.815	14	6
11	27	(Japan) Kaito Toba	KTM	18	+8.828	16	5
12	40	(South Africa) Darryn Binder	KTM	18	+8.849	15	4
13	13	(Italy) Celestino Vietti	KTM	18	+8.866	24	3
14	16	(Italy) Andrea Migno	KTM	18	+8.986	11	2
15	53	(Turkey) Deniz Öncü	KTM	18	+9.089	19	1
16	11	(Spain) Sergio García	Honda	18	+9.124	27	
17	6	(Japan) Ryusei Yamanaka	Honda	18	+9.589	17	
18	99	(Spain) Carlos Tatay	KTM	18	+9.723	22	
19	2	(Argentina) Gabriel Rodrigo	Honda	18	+12.594	2	
20	71	(Japan) Ayumu Sasaki	KTM	18	+12.656	28	
21	70	(Belgium) Barry Baltus	KTM	18	+23.720	21	
22	89	(Malaysia) Khairul Idham Pawi	Honda	18	+23.766	30	
23	50	(Switzerland) Jason Dupasquier	KTM	18	+31.955	29	
24	9	(Italy) Davide Pizzoli	KTM	18	+36.734	31 (Note: Back of the grid start penalty.)	
25	12	(Czech Republic) Filip Salač	Honda	18	+47.046	20	
Ret	5	(Spain) Jaume Masiá	Honda	15	Accident	13	
Ret	92	(Japan) Yuki Kunii	Honda	14	Accident Damage	10	
Ret	24	(Japan) Tatsuki Suzuki	Honda	9	Accident	3	
Ret	21	(Spain) Alonso López	Husqvarna	9	Accident	25	
Ret	73	(Austria) Maximilian Kofler	KTM	8	Accident Damage	26	
Ret	54	(Italy) Riccardo Rossi	KTM	7	Accident	23	
OFFICIAL MOTO3 RACE REPORT

== Championship standings after the race ==
Below are the standings for the top five riders, constructors, and teams after the round.

=== MotoGP ===
Riders' Championship standings

	Pos.	Rider	Points
	1	(France) Fabio Quartararo	59
	2	(Spain) Maverick Viñales	42
7	3	(Italy) Franco Morbidelli	31
1	4	(Italy) Andrea Dovizioso	31
13	5	(South Africa) Brad Binder	28

Constructors' Championship standings

	Pos.	Constructor	Points
	1	(Japan) Yamaha	70
2	2	(Austria) KTM	44
1	3	(Italy) Ducati	42
1	4	(Japan) Honda	27
	5	(Japan) Suzuki	24

Teams' Championship standings

	Pos.	Team	Points
	1	(Malaysia) Petronas Yamaha SRT	90
	2	(Japan) Monster Energy Yamaha MotoGP	69
3	3	(Austria) Red Bull KTM Factory Racing	47
1	4	(Italy) Ducati Team	42
2	5	(Spain) Esponsorama Racing	35

=== Moto2 ===
Riders' Championship standings

	Pos.	Rider	Points
1	1	(Italy) Enea Bastianini	73
1	2	(Italy) Luca Marini	58
2	3	(Japan) Tetsuta Nagashima	55
3	4	(United Kingdom) Sam Lowes	46
1	5	(Spain) Arón Canet	36

Constructors' Championship standings

Pos.	Constructor	Points
1	(Germany) Kalex	100
2	(Italy) Speed Up	41
3	(Italy) MV Agusta	13
4	(Japan) NTS	5

Teams' Championship standings

	Pos.	Team	Points
	1	(Finland) Red Bull KTM Ajo	89
	2	(Italy) Sky Racing Team VR46	88
	3	(Italy) Italtrans Racing Team	73
2	4	(Belgium) EG 0,0 Marc VDS	63
1	5	(Spain) Openbank Aspar Team	53

=== Moto3 ===
Riders' Championship standings

	Pos.	Rider	Points
	1	(Spain) Albert Arenas	70
2	2	(Japan) Ai Ogura	52
	3	(United Kingdom) John McPhee	51
2	4	(Japan) Tatsuki Suzuki	44
2	5	(Spain) Raúl Fernández	36

Constructors' Championship standings

	Pos.	Constructor	Points
1	1	(Japan) Honda	90
1	2	(Austria) KTM	86
	3	(Sweden) Husqvarna	17

Teams' Championship standings

	Pos.	Team	Points
	1	(Spain) Gaviota Aspar Team	82
	2	(Italy) Sic58 Squadra Corse	65
	3	(Italy) Kömmerling Gresini Moto3	58
2	4	(Japan) Honda Team Asia	52
4	5	(Luxembourg) Leopard Racing	51

== Notes ==
Previous race: 2020 Andalusian Grand Prix	FIM Grand Prix World Championship; 2020 season	Next race: 2020 Austrian Grand Prix
Previous race: 2019 Czech Republic Grand Prix	Czech Republic motorcycle Grand Prix	Next race: 2025 Czech Grand Prix
