= Ayumu Sasaki =

Japanese motorcycle racer (born 2000)

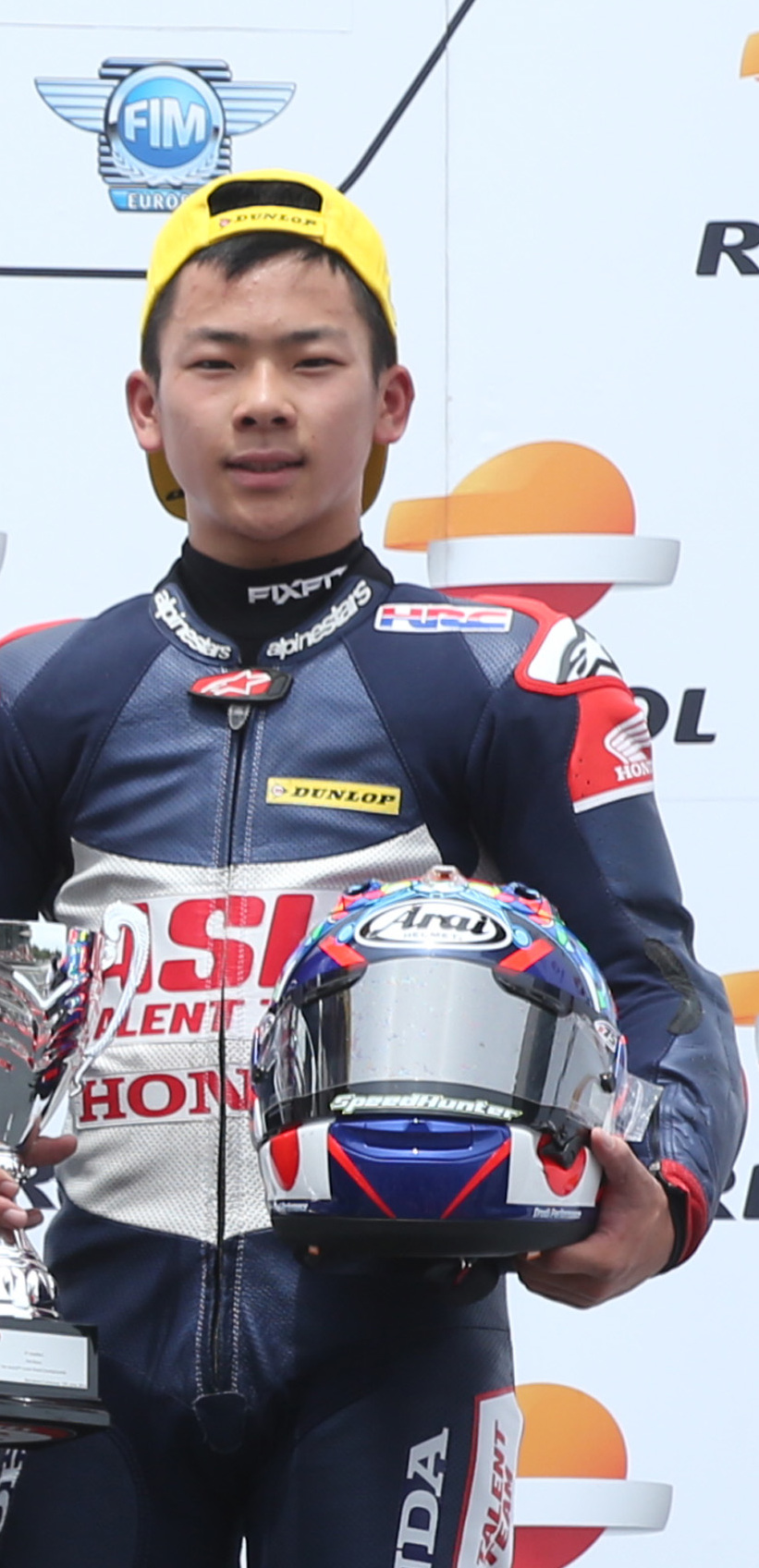
- Sasaki in 2016
- Nationality: Japanese
- Born: October 4, 2000 (age 26); Yokosuka, Japan
- Current team: Momoven Idrofoglia RW Racing Team
- Bike number: 71
Motorcycle racing career statistics
Moto2 World Championship
Active years	2024–
Manufacturers	Kalex
2025 championship position	23rd (24 pts)
Starts / Wins / Podiums / Poles / F. laps / Points; 54 / 0 / 0 / 0 / 0 / 57
Moto3 World Championship
Active years	2016–2023
Manufacturers	Honda (2016–2019); KTM (2020–2021); Husqvarna (2022–2023)
Championships	0
2023 championship position	2nd (268 pts)
Starts / Wins / Podiums / Poles / F. laps / Points; 124 / 3 / 22 / 8 / 8 / 822

Ayumu Sasaki (佐々木 歩夢, Sasaki Ayumu; born October 4, 2000) is a Japanese Grand Prix motorcycle racer currently competing in the Moto2 class for the Dutch RW Racing Team. He most recently competed in Moto3 from 2016 to 2023, where he finished runner-up in his final year in the category behind eventual champion Jaume Masià.

== Career ==
=== Junior career ===
In 2015, Sasaki was the Asia Talent Cup champion and also competed in the 2015 Red Bull MotoGP Rookies Cup, winning a race in Silverstone, and finishing in second twice, and third twice, finishing the season third in the standings.

In the 2016 Red Bull MotoGP Rookies Cup, Sasaki won four races, finished on the podium eleven times during the 13 races, and never finished outside the top four, winning the title by 49 points.

=== Moto3 World Championship ===
==== Gresini Racing Moto3 (2016) ====
In the 2016 Moto3 World Championship, Sasaki made his Grand Prix debut with the Gresini Racing team at the Malaysian Grand Prix as the replacement rider for the injured Enea Bastianini.

==== SIC Racing Team (2017) ====
Sasaki was signed up to race in the 2017 Moto3 World Championship for Sepang Racing Team, partnering Adam Norrodin. Sasaki had an impressive rookie campaign, finishing in the points eight times, twice in the top-ten (eighth place in Mugello, and seventh at Phillip Island), and ended up winning rookie of the year, scoring 32 points, finishing 20th in the standings.

==== Petronas Sprinta Racing (2018–2019) ====
Staying with Sepang SIC Racing Team for the 2018 Moto3 World Championship, Sasaki basically copied his 2017 campaign: he finished in the points eight times, his two best finishes were a seventh place in Austria, and an eighth place in Qatar, and finished the season 20th in the standings, with 50 points.

For the 2019 Moto3 World Championship, Sasaki would stay with Petronas Sepang Racing Team, but would be partnered by John McPhee. Sasaki improved, with five top-ten finishes (fifth in Argentina, sixth in Britain, seventh in Australia, eighth in Barcelona, and ninth in Germany), 11-point scoring finishes, a pole position at the Sachsenring, finishing the season with 62 points, and 20th in the standings.

==== Red Bull KTM Tech3 (2020–2021) ====
Sasaki switched teams for the 2020 Moto3 World Championship, signing with Red Bull KTM Tech3, to partner Deniz Öncü. Sasaki and Öncü were very evenly matched during the year, Sasaki collecting 52 points, and Öncü 50. Sasaki finished in the points eight times, in the top-ten three times, and scored his first career Moto3 podium at Aragón, seeing the checkered flag in second place, just 0.051 seconds behind Jaume Masiá.

Tech3 kept both Öncü and Sasaki for the 2021 season, and both riders improved. Sasaki especially started the season well, with a seventh place in Doha, a fourth place in Portimao, a fifth place in Jerez, a fifth place in Le Mans, and a fifth place in Mugello. On May 29, 2021, in the 2021 Italian motorcycle Grand Prix, Sasaki was involved in an accident with Jason Dupasquier and Jeremy Alcoba. Dupasquier succumbed to his injuries the following day. Following the accident, Sasaki did not participate in the following two races. He returned for Austria, finishing in fifth place, before scoring his only podium of the season in Aragón, finishing third, with Öncü finishing second. He scored 120 points during the year, finishing ninth in the championship standings.

==== Sterilgarda Husqvarna Max (2022) ====
For 2022, Sasaki was contracted to race for Sterilgarda Husqvarna Max team, along with 2019 teammate John McPhee.

==== Liqui Moly Husqvarna Intact GP (2023) ====
In 2023 Moto3 World Championship, Sasaki was riding for Liqui Moly Husqvarna Intact GP.

=== Moto2 World Championship ===
==== Yamaha VR46 Master Camp Team (2024) ====
Sasaki joined the Yamaha VR46 Master Camp Team for the 2024 Moto2 Season, making his Moto2 debut partnering Jeremy Alcoba.

==== RW-Idrofoglia Racing GP (2025-2026) ====
After Yamaha VR46 Master Camp Team left the championship, Sasaki signed a two-year contract for RW-Idrofoglia Racing GP.

== Career statistics ==
=== Asia Talent Cup ===
==== Races by year ====
(key) (Races in bold indicate pole position; races in italics indicate fastest lap)

Year	Bike	1	2	3		4		5	6		Pos	Pts
Year	Bike	R1	R1	R1	R2	R1	R2	R1	R1	R2	Pos	Pts
2014	Honda	QAT; 3	IDN; 4	**CHN1**; 3	**CHN2**; 3	MAL1; Ret	MAL2; 1	JAP; 1	MYS1; Ret	MYS2	4th	111

Year	Bike	1	2	3	4	5	6	7	8	9	10	11	12	Pos	Pts
2015	Honda	THA1; 2	THA2; 2	QAT1; 3	QAT2; 2	**MAL1**; 1	MAL2; Ret	CHN1; 1	CHN2; 6	**JPN1**; 1	JPN2; 2	SEP1; 4	SEP2; 7	1st	203

=== Red Bull MotoGP Rookies Cup ===
==== Races by year ====
(key) (Races in bold indicate pole position, races in italics indicate fastest lap)

Year	1	2	3	4	5	6	7	8	9	10	11	12	13	Pos	Pts
2015	JER1; 6	JER2; Ret	ASS1; 6	ASS2; 6	SAC1; 2	SAC2; Ret	BRN1; 6	BRN2; 5	SIL1; 3	SIL2; 1	MIS; 3	ARA1; 4	ARA2; 2	3rd	161
2016	JER1; 2	JER2; 1	ASS1; 4	ASS2; 2	**SAC1**; 1	**SAC2**; 3	RBR1; 3	RBR2; 2	BRN1; 3	BRN2; 3	MIS; 1	ARA1; 4	ARA2; 1	1st	250

=== FIM CEV Moto3 Junior World Championship ===
==== Races by year ====
(key) (Races in bold indicate pole position, races in italics indicate fastest lap)

Year	Bike	1	2	3	4	5	6	7	8	9	10	11	12	Pos	Pts
2015	Honda	ALG	LMS	CAT1	CAT2	ARA1	ARA2	ALB	NAV	JER1	JER2	VAL1; 3	VAL2; 11	21st	21
2016	Honda	VAL1; 4	VAL2; Ret	LMS; 10	ARA; 9	CAT1; 3	CAT2; 4	ALB; 9	ALG; Ret	JER1; 6	JER2; 5	VAL1	VAL2	6th	83

=== Grand Prix motorcycle racing ===
==== By season ====
Season	Class	Motorcycle	Team	Race	Win	Podium	Pole	FLap	Pts	Plcd
2016	Moto3	Honda	Gresini Racing Moto3	1	0	0	0	0	0	NC
2017	Moto3	Honda	SIC Racing Team	18	0	0	0	0	32	20th
2018	Moto3	Honda	Petronas Sprinta Racing	17	0	0	0	0	50	20th
2019	Moto3	Honda	Petronas Sprinta Racing	19	0	0	1	0	62	20th
2020	Moto3	KTM	Red Bull KTM Tech3	15	0	1	0	1	52	16th
2021	Moto3	KTM	Red Bull KTM Tech3	16	0	1	0	0	120	9th
2022	Moto3	Husqvarna	Sterilgarda Husqvarna Max	18	2	9	2	1	238	4th
2023	Moto3	Husqvarna	Liqui Moly Husqvarna Intact GP	20	1	11	5	6	268	**2nd**
2024	Moto2	Kalex	Yamaha VR46 Master Camp Team	16	0	0	0	0	7	26th
2025	Moto2	Kalex	RW-Idrofoglia Racing GP	21	0	0	0	0	24	23rd
2026	Moto2	Kalex	Momoven Idrofoglia RW Racing Team	17	0	0	0	0	26*	20th*
Total				**178**	**3**	**22**	**8**	**8**	**879**	

==== By class ====
Class	Seasons	1st GP	1st pod	1st win	Race	Win	Podiums	Pole	FLap	Pts	WChmp
Moto3	2016–2023	2016 Malaysia	2020 Teruel	2022 Netherlands	124	3	22	8	8	822	0
Moto2	2024–present	2024 Qatar			54	0	0	0	0	57	0
Total	2016–present				**178**	**3**	**22**	**8**	**8**	**879**	**0**

==== Races by year ====
(key) (Races in bold indicate pole position, races in italics indicate fastest lap)

Year	Class	Bike	1	2	3	4	5	6	7	8	9	10	11	12	13	14	15	16	17	18	19	20	21	22	Pos	Pts
2016	Moto3	Honda	QAT	ARG	AME	SPA	FRA	ITA	CAT	NED	GER	AUT	CZE	GBR	RSM	ARA	JPN	AUS	MAL; Ret	VAL					NC	0
2017	Moto3	Honda	QAT; 11	ARG; 20	AME; 18	SPA; 15	FRA; 19	ITA; 8	CAT; 16	NED; 15	GER; 17	CZE; 15	AUT; 18	GBR; 18	RSM; Ret	ARA; 16	JPN; Ret	AUS; 7	MAL; 12	VAL; 13					20th	32
2018	Moto3	Honda	QAT; 8	ARG; 16	AME; 11	SPA; 12	FRA; 16	ITA; 16	CAT; Ret	NED; 19	GER; 10	CZE; 22	AUT; 7	GBR; C	RSM; Ret	ARA	THA; Ret	JPN; 9	AUS; 10	MAL; 18	VAL; 11				20th	50
2019	Moto3	Honda	QAT; Ret	ARG; 5	AME; Ret	SPA; 15	FRA; 14	ITA; Ret	CAT; 8	NED; 17	**GER**; 9	CZE; 11	AUT; 13	GBR; 6	RSM; Ret	ARA; 13	THA; Ret	JPN; 13	AUS; 7	MAL; Ret	VAL; 19				20th	62
2020	Moto3	KTM	QAT; 19	SPA; 11	ANC; Ret	CZE; 20	AUT; 13	STY; Ret	RSM; Ret	EMI; 14	CAT; 17	FRA; 6	ARA; 13	TER; 2	EUR; 10	VAL; 19	POR; 13								16th	52
2021	Moto3	KTM	QAT; Ret	DOH; 7	POR; 4	SPA; 5	FRA; 5	ITA; 4	CAT; Ret	GER	NED	STY; 5	AUT; Ret	GBR; 13	ARA; 3	RSM; 10	AME; 13	EMI; 8	ALR; 6	VAL; 10					9th	120
2022	Moto3	Husqvarna	QAT; Ret	INA; Ret	ARG; 3	AME; 4	POR; 3	SPA; 6	FRA; 2	ITA; DNS	CAT	GER; 4	**NED**; 1	GBR; Ret	AUT; 1	RSM; Ret	ARA; 2	JPN; 3	THA; 2	**AUS**; 4	MAL; 2	VAL; 5			4th	238
2023	Moto3	Husqvarna	**POR**; 6	**ARG**; Ret	AME; Ret	SPA; 4	**FRA**; 2	ITA; 3	**GER**; 2	NED; 2	GBR; 2	AUT; 3	CAT; 4	RSM; 7	IND; 3	JPN; 2	INA; 18	**AUS**; 2	THA; Ret	MAL; 2	QAT; 6	VAL; 1			2nd	268
2024	Moto2	Kalex	QAT; Ret	POR; Ret	AME	SPA; DNS	FRA; 22	CAT; Ret	ITA; Ret	NED; Ret	GER; 24	GBR; 21	AUT; 21	ARA; 12	RSM; 16	EMI; 19	INA; 16	JPN; 21	AUS; Ret	THA; 13	MAL; WD	SLD			26th	7
2025	Moto2	Kalex	THA; 23	ARG; 18	AME; 19	QAT; Ret	SPA; Ret	FRA; 20	GBR; 17	ARA; Ret	ITA; 19	NED; 15	GER; 9	CZE; Ret	AUT; 13	HUN; Ret	CAT; Ret	RSM; 14	JPN; 14	INA; 13	AUS; 10	MAL; 17	POR; Ret	VAL; DNS	23rd	24
2026	Moto2	Kalex	THA; 10^{‡}	BRA; DNS	USA; 17	SPA; 12	FRA; Ret	CAT; 15	ITA; Ret	HUN; 19	CZE; 16	NED; 19	GER; 13	GBR; 11	ARA; 13	RSM; DNS	AUT; 22	JPN; 14	INA; 13	AUS; C	MAL; Ret	QAT; 14	POR	VAL	20th*	26*

^{‡} Half points awarded as less than half of the race distance (but at least three full laps) was completed.
* Season still in progress.

Sporting positions
Preceded by Bo Bendsneyder	Red Bull MotoGP Rookies Cup; Champion; 2016	Succeeded by Kazuki Masaki
