= Circuito Guadix =

Motorsports facility in Granada, Spain

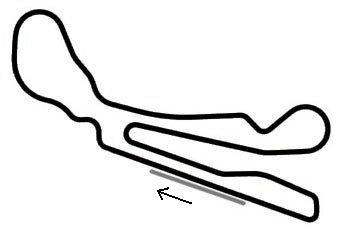
- Location: Granada, Spain
- Coordinates: 37°24′6″N 3°4′29″W
- Broke ground: 2000
- Opened: 3 June 2002; 23 years ago
- Major events: A1GP practice
- Length: 3.000 km (1.864 miles)
- Turns: 19

Circuito Guadix is a motorsports facility located in Granada, Spain near the Sierra Nevada. The circuit was redesigned by Clive Greenhalgh and reopened in mid-January 2007. The facility can also be configured in two layouts about 3.000 km (1.864 mi) with a mix of slow, fast and multiple corners and a 750 m (820 yd) main straight.

The circuit is used by many companies including Renault Motorsport, KTM, Superbike Magazine and 95% of all British Superbike factory teams.

== Events ==
- A1 Grand Prix practice
- FAA Campeonato Andalucia Automovilismo (Race meetings)
- Neugrip (Bike Track Days)
- Pedro Outon
- Superbike Racing School
- White Planet Cars (Car Track Days)
- Trackdays Spain's Car Trackdays (every two months)
- Historic F1 testing.
