= 2022 French motorcycle Grand Prix =

Motorcycle race in Le Mans

(France) 2022 French Grand Prix
Race details
- Race 7 of 20 races in the 2022 Grand Prix motorcycle racing season
- Date: 14–15 May 2022
- Official name: Shark Grand Prix de France
- Location: Bugatti Circuit; Le Mans, France
- Course: Permanent racing facility; 4.185 km (2.600 mi)

MotoGP
Pole position
Rider	(Italy) Francesco Bagnaia	Ducati
Time	1:30.450	
Fastest lap
Rider	(Italy) Francesco Bagnaia	Ducati
Time	1:31.778 on lap 4	
Podium
First	(Italy) Enea Bastianini	Ducati
Second	(Australia) Jack Miller	Ducati
Third	(Spain) Aleix Espargaró	Aprilia

Moto2
Pole position
Rider	(Spain) Pedro Acosta	Kalex
Time	1:35.803	
Fastest lap
Rider	(Spain) Augusto Fernández	Kalex
Time	1:36.276 on lap 5	
Podium
First	(Spain) Augusto Fernández	Kalex
Second	(Spain) Arón Canet	Kalex
Third	(Thailand) Somkiat Chantra	Kalex

Moto3
Pole position
Rider	(Italy) Dennis Foggia	Honda
Time	1:41.621	
Fastest lap
Rider	(Spain) Izan Guevara	Gas Gas
Time	1:42.081 on lap 12	
Podium
First	(Spain) Jaume Masià	KTM
Second	(Japan) Ayumu Sasaki	Husqvarna
Third	(Spain) Izan Guevara	Gas Gas

MotoE Race 1
Pole position
Rider	(Italy) Mattia Casadei	Energica
Time	1:43.559	
Fastest lap
Rider	(Italy) Mattia Casadei	Energica
Time	1:43.474 on lap 2	
Podium
First	(Italy) Mattia Casadei	Energica
Second	(Switzerland) Dominique Aegerter	Energica
Third	(Japan) Hikari Okubo	Energica

MotoE Race 2
Pole position
Rider	(Italy) Mattia Casadei	Energica
Time	1:43.559	
Fastest lap
Rider	(Italy) Andrea Mantovani	Energica
Time	1:43.551 on lap 4	
Podium
First	(Switzerland) Dominique Aegerter	Energica
Second	(Italy) Mattia Casadei	Energica
Third	(Italy) Niccolò Canepa	Energica

The 2022 French motorcycle Grand Prix (officially known as the Shark Grand Prix de France) was the seventh round of the 2022 Grand Prix motorcycle racing season and the second round of the 2022 MotoE World Cup. All races (except MotoE race 1 which was held on 14 May) were held at the Bugatti Circuit in Le Mans on 15 May 2022.

== Background ==
=== Riders' entries ===
In MotoGP class the riders and teams were the same as the season entry list with no additional stand-in riders for the race. In the Moto2 class, after the termination of the contract between Speed Up and Romano Fenati, the team chose to replace him with Alonso López; Stefano Manzi continues to replace Keminth Kubo in the Yamaha VR46 Master Camp Team, given the Thai rider's inadequacy. In the Moto3 class, in addition to the presence of Gerard Riu to replace David Muñoz on the KTM of the Boé SKX, the Italian rider Alberto Surra is still unavailable due to a fracture to his scaphoid in the GP of the Americas. After being replaced in the stages of Portugal and Spain by the Malaysian Syarifuddin Azman, in this Grand Prix the choice of the Rivacold Snipers Team goes to the Spaniard José Antonio Rueda; while John McPhee returns to the track with the Sterilgarda Husqvarna Max team after he is healed in the vertebra. In the MotoE class, Xavi Cardelús makes his debut this season in Avintia Esponsorama Racing after missing the opening stage in Jerez due to injury, while Bradley Smith is still out due to injury after his crash at the 24 Hours of Le Mans. WithU GRT RNF MotoE Team replaces him with Andrea Mantovani.

=== MotoGP Championship standings before the race ===
In the riders' classification, Fabio Quartararo became the only leader with 89 points. Aleix Espargaró with 82 points climbs into second position, ahead of Enea Bastianini and Álex Rins (before the Spanish Grand Prix in the lead with Quartararo) with 69 points and Francesco Bagnaia, winner in Jerez, and Joan Mir with 56 points. In the constructors' classification, Ducati is confirmed in the lead with 131 points, 42 points ahead of Yamaha, 48 over Aprilia, 51 over Suzuki, 55 over KTM and 74 over Honda. In the team standings, Team Suzuki Ecstar is first with 125 points, followed by Aprilia Racing (109 points), Monster Energy Yamaha MotoGP (107 points), Ducati Lenovo Team (98 points) and Red Bull KTM Factory Racing (91 points).

=== Moto2 Championship standings before the race ===
In the riders' classification, Celestino Vietti is always in the lead with 100 points, 19 more than Ai Ogura (victorious in the previous race), 30 more than Tony Arbolino, 31 more than Arón Canet, who overtakes Joe Roberts (to minus 43 points from the leader). The constructors' classification sees Kalex at 150 points, Boscoscuro at 20 points and MV Agusta at 5 points. The top five positions in the team standings are occupied by Idemitsu Honda Team Asia (126 points), Flexbox HP40 (114 points), Elf Marc VDS Racing Team (105 points), Mooney VR46 Racing Team (100 points) and Liqui Moly Intact GP (75 points).

=== Moto3 Championship standings before the race ===
Sergio García increases the advantage over Dennis Foggia at the top of the riders' standings (103 points for the first, 82 points for the second). Izan Guevara, winner in Jerez, is third with 73 points, 3 more than Jaume Masià and 10 more than Deniz Öncü. In the constructors' classification, Gas Gas leads with 124 points, 21 more than Honda, 26 more than KTM, 58 more than Husqvarna and 63 more than CFMoto. In the team championship standings, Aspar Team is firmly in the lead with 176 points, followed by 67 points behind by Leopard Racing. Red Bull KTM Ajo is third with 93 points, 14 more than CFMoto Racing Prüstel GP and 23 more than Red Bull KTM Tech3.

=== MotoE cup standings before the race ===
Eric Granado, winner of both races in Jerez, leads with full points with 50 points, with a 17-point lead over Dominique Aegerter. Miquel Pons is third at 28 points, followed by Matteo Ferrari (26 points) and Hikari Okubo (21 points).

== Free practice ==
=== MotoGP ===
In the first session, Pol Espargaró was the fastest, followed by Álex Rins and Francesco Bagnaia. In the second session, Enea Bastianini preceded Aleix Espargaró and Rins. In the third session, Johann Zarco finished at the top of the standings ahead of Bagnaia and Fabio Quartararo.

==== Combined Free Practice 1-2-3 ====
The top ten riders (written in bold) qualified in Q2.

Fastest session lap

Pos.	No.	Biker	Constructor	Free practice times		
Pos.	No.	Biker	Constructor	FP1	FP2	FP3
1	5	**(France) Johann Zarco**	**Ducati**	1:32.112	1:31.508	**1:30.537**
2	63	**(Italy) Francesco Bagnaia**	**Ducati**	1:31.893	1:31.635	**1:30.568**
3	20	**(France) Fabio Quartararo**	**Yamaha**	1:31.912	1:31.640	**1:30.682**
4	93	**(Spain) Marc Márquez**	**Honda**	1:32.266	1:32.153	**1:30.785**
5	43	**(Australia) Jack Miller**	**Ducati**	1:31.961	1:31.914	**1:30.837**
6	41	**(Spain) Aleix Espargaró**	**Aprilia**	1:31.933	1:31.350	**1:30.986**
7	30	**(Japan) Takaaki Nakagami**	**Honda**	1:32.165	1:33.397	**1:31.062**
8	42	**(Spain) Álex Rins**	**Suzuki**	1:31.880	1:31.445	**1:31.087**
9	44	**(Spain) Pol Espargaró**	**Honda**	1:31.771	1:32.076	**1:31.102**
10	23	**(Italy) Enea Bastianini**	**Ducati**	1:32.255	**1:31.148**	1:31.539
11	89	(Spain) Jorge Martín	Ducati	1:32.491	1:31.912	**1:31.151**
12	12	(Spain) Maverick Viñales	Aprilia	1:32.078	1:32.051	**1:31.169**
13	36	(Spain) Joan Mir	Suzuki	1:31.942	1:31.666	**1:31.228**
14	10	(Italy) Luca Marini	Ducati	1:32.128	1:32.416	**1:31.228**
15	33	(South Africa) Brad Binder	KTM	1:32.756	1:31.657	**1:31.353**
16	72	(Italy) Marco Bezzecchi	Ducati	1:32.674	1:32.314	**1:31.403**
17	49	(Italy) Fabio Di Giannantonio	Ducati	1:32.755	1:32.275	**1:31.593**
18	88	(Portugal) Miguel Oliveira	KTM	1:33.021	1:32.695	**1:31.699**
19	21	(Italy) Franco Morbidelli	Yamaha	1:32.937	1:32.025	**1:31.716**
20	4	(Italy) Andrea Dovizioso	Yamaha	1:32.736	1:32.536	**1:31.847**
21	87	(Australia) Remy Gardner	KTM	1:33.302	1:32.737	**1:31.887**
22	73	(Spain) Álex Márquez	Honda	1:32.767	1:32.505	**1:32.002**
23	25	(Spain) Raúl Fernández	KTM	1:34.151	1:33.557	**1:33.083**
OFFICIAL MOTOGP COMBINED FREE PRACTICE TIMES REPORT

==== Free practice 4 ====
Fabio Quartararo finished in the lead ahead of Álex Rins and Francesco Bagnaia.

=== Moto2 ===
Somkiat Chantra finished ahead of everyone in the first session ahead of Augusto Fernández and Stefano Manzi. In the second and third session the fastest was Pedro Acosta: in the first case he preceded Chantra and Fernández, in the second case Fernández ahead of Chantra.

==== Combined Free Practice 1-2-3 ====
The top fourteen riders (written in bold) qualified in Q2.

Fastest session lap

Pos.	No.	Biker	Constructor	Free practice times		
Pos.	No.	Biker	Constructor	FP1	FP2	FP3
1	51	**(Spain) Pedro Acosta**	**Kalex**	1:36.754	1:36.166	**1:35.861**
2	37	**(Spain) Augusto Fernández**	**Kalex**	1:36.263	1:36.394	**1:36.005**
3	35	**(Thailand) Somkiat Chantra**	**Kalex**	**1:36.108**	1:36.328	1:36.144
4	22	**(United Kingdom)** **Sam Lowes**	**Kalex**	1:36.654	1:36.403	**1:36.169**
5	75	**(Spain) Albert Arenas**	**Kalex**	1:36.749	1:36.648	**1:36.247**
6	79	**(Japan) Ai Ogura**	**Kalex**	1:37.048	1:36.630	**1:36.273**
7	40	**(Spain) Arón Canet**	**Kalex**	1:37.515	1:36.803	**1:36.309**
8	14	**(Italy) Tony Arbolino**	**Kalex**	1:37.158	1:36.517	**1:36.325**
9	6	**(United States) Cameron Beaubier**	**Kalex**	1:37.148	1:37.428	**1:36.418**
10	21	**(Spain) Alonso López**	**Boscoscuro**	1:36.797	1:37.383	**1:36.539**
11	42	(Spain) **Marcos Rámirez**	**MV Agusta**	1:37.162	1:37.043	**1:36.551**
12	96	(United Kingdom) **Jake Dixon**	**Kalex**	1:36.750	1:36.610	**1:36.572**
13	23	(Germany) **Marcel Schrötter**	**Kalex**	1:36.710	**1:36.589**	1:36.665
14	62	(Italy) **Stefano Manzi**	**Kalex**	**1:36.608**	1:36.877	1:36.847
15	7	(Belgium) Barry Baltus	Kalex	1:37.395	1:36.772	**1:36.626**
16	13	(Italy) Celestino Vietti	Kalex	1:36.746	1:37.430	**1:36.636**
17	2	(Argentina) Gabriel Rodrigo	Kalex	1:37.673	1:37.059	**1:36.659**
18	9	(Spain) Jorge Navarro	Kalex	1:37.127	1:37.036	**1:36.687**
19	54	(Spain) Fermín Aldeguer	Boscoscuro	1:37.152	1:37.254	**1:36.688**
20	16	(United States) Joe Roberts	Kalex	1:37.337	1:36.806	**1:36.697**
21	64	(Netherlands) Bo Bendsneyder	Kalex	1:37.602	1:37.037	**1:36.707**
22	19	(Italy) Lorenzo Dalla Porta	Kalex	1:37.747	1:37.148	**1:36.746**
23	18	(Spain) Manuel González	Kalex	**1:36.844**	1:37.177	1:37.477
24	24	(Italy) Simone Corsi	MV Agusta	1:38.520	1:37.151	**1.37.133**
25	12	(Czech Republic) Filip Salač	Kalex	1:37.368	1:37.946	**1:37.179**
26	28	(Italy) Niccolò Antonelli	Kalex	1:37.950	1:38.171	**1:37.183**
27	61	(Italy) Alessandro Zaccone	Kalex	**1:37.356**	1:38.170	1:37.499
28	52	(Spain) Jeremy Alcoba	Kalex	1:38.357	1:37.483	**1:37.449**
29	84	(Netherlands) Zonta van den Goorbergh	Kalex	1:37.859	**1:37.798**	1:37.869
30	4	(United States) Sean Dylan Kelly	Kalex	1:40.028	1:39.203	**1:38.642**
OFFICIAL MOTO2 COMBINED FREE PRACTICE TIMES REPORT

=== Moto3 ===
Dennis Foggia was the dominator of free practice, having been the fastest in all three sessions. In the first he preceded his teammate Tatsuki Suzuki and Andrea Migno, in the second and third he finished ahead of Izan Guevara and Suzuki.

==== Combined Free Practice 1-2-3 ====
The top fourteen riders (written in bold) qualified in Q2.

Fastest session lap

Pos.	No.	Biker	Constructor	Free practice times		
Pos.	No.	Biker	Constructor	FP1	FP2	FP3
1	7	**(Italy) Dennis Foggia**	**Honda**	1:42.184	**1:41.680**	1:41.710
2	28	**(Spain) Izan Guevara**	**Gas Gas**	1:42.489	1:42.108	**1:41.776**
3	24	**(Japan) Tatsuki Suzuki**	**Honda**	1:42.461	1:42.203	**1:41.971**
4	99	**(Spain)** **Carlos Tatay**	**CFMoto**	1:43.104	1:42.326	**1:42.089**
5	5	**(Spain) Jaume Masià**	**KTM**	1:42.615	1:42.348	**1:42.113**
6	43	**(Spain) Xavier Artigas**	**CFMoto**	1:43.648	1:42.894	**1:42.119**
7	16	**(Italy) Andrea Migno**	**Honda**	1:42.473	1:42.618	**1:42.160**
8	96	**(Spain) Daniel Holgado**	**KTM**	1:42.733	1:42.843	**1:42.178**
9	6	**(Japan) Ryusei Yamanaka**	**KTM**	1:42.601	1:43.219	**1:42.241**
10	11	**(Spain) Sergio García**	**Gas Gas**	1:43.166	1:43.021	**1:42.244**
11	71	(Japan) **Ayumu Sasaki**	**Husqvarna**	1:43.680	1:42.678	**1:42.302**
12	17	(United Kingdom) **John McPhee**	**Husqvarna**	1:43.528	1:42.732	**1:42.327**
13	66	(Australia) **Joel Kelso**	**KTM**	1:44.190	1:43.332	**1:42.332**
14	10	(Brazil) **Diogo Moreira**	**KTM**	1:42.840	1:42.800	**1.42.333**
15	98	(Spain) José Antonio Rueda	Honda	1:43.308	1:43.601	**1:42.413**
16	82	(Italy) Stefano Nepa	KTM	1:43.842	1:43.416	**1:42.455**
17	48	(Spain) Iván Ortolá	KTM	1:43.840	1:43.635	**1:42.461**
18	23	(Italy) Elia Bartolini	KTM	1:44.617	1:42.552	**1:42.472**
19	27	(Japan) Kaito Toba	KTM	1:44.381	1:43.101	**1:42.618**
20	54	(Italy) Riccardo Rossi	Honda	1:42.706	**1:42.649**	1:43.247
21	19	(United Kingdom) Scott Ogden	Honda	1:44.435	1:43.628	**1:42.674**
22	31	(Spain) Adrián Fernández	KTM	1:43.731	1:43.826	**1:42.741**
23	64	(Indonesia) Mario Aji	Honda	1:43.605	1:43.385	**1:42.784**
24	53	(Turkey) Deniz Öncü	KTM	1:43.146	**1:42.792**	1.43.247
25	18	(Italy) Matteo Bertelle	KTM	1:44.594	1:43.127	**1:42.979**
26	20	(France) Lorenzo Fellon	Honda	1:43.843	1:43.813	**1:43.323**
27	87	(Spain) Gerard Riu	KTM	1:44.179	1:44.111	**1:43.417**
28	72	(Japan) Taiyo Furusato	Honda	1:45.172	1:43.924	**1:43.759**
29	22	(Japan) Ana Carrasco	KTM	1:45.020	1:44.981	**1:44.118**
30	70	(United Kingdom) Joshua Whatley	Honda	1:46.096	1:45.644	**1:45.598**
OFFICIAL MOTO3 COMBINED FREE PRACTICE TIMES REPORT

=== MotoE ===
In the first session, Mattia Casadei was the fastest, ahead of Jordi Torres and Miquel Pons. In the second, Torres finished in the lead ahead of Matteo Ferrari and Kevin Zannoni.

==== Combined Free Practice 1 and 2 ====
The top eight riders (written in bold) qualified in Q2.

Fastest session lap

Pos.	No.	Biker	Constructor	Free practice times	
Pos.	No.	Biker	Constructor	FP1	FP2
1	40	**(Spain) Jordi Torres**	**Energica**	1:45.900	**1:44.288**
2	11	**(Italy) Matteo Ferrari**	**Energica**	1:47.893	**1:44.402**
3	21	**(Italy) Kevin Zannoni**	**Energica**	1:47.077	**1:44.429**
4	18	**(Andorra) Xavi Cardelús**	**Energica**	1:47.918	**1:44.508**
5	51	**(Brazil) Eric Granado**	**Energica**	1:46.294	**1:44.750**
6	7	**(Italy) Niccolò Canepa**	**Energica**	1:47.187	**1:44.775**
7	12	**(Spain) Xavi Forés**	**Energica**	1:46.100	**1:44.781**
8	77	**(Switzerland) Dominique Aegerter**	**Energica**	1:46.687	**1:44.833**
9	17	**(Spain)** Álex Escrig	Energica	1:47.968	**1:44.836**
10	78	**(Japan)** Hikari Okubo	Energica	1:46.453	**1:44.848**
11	4	(Spain) Héctor Garzó	Energica	1:46.325	**1:45.095**
12	70	(Spain) Marc Alcoba	Energica	1:46.562	**1:45.096**
13	6	(Spain) María Herrera	Energica	1:46.789	**1:45.339**
14	71	(Spain) Miquel Pons	Energica	1:46.086	**1.45.391**
15	34	(Italy) Kevin Manfredi	Energica	1:47.387	**1:45.737**
16	27	(Italy) Mattia Casadei	Energica	**1:45.864**	No time
17	72	(Italy) Alessio Finello	Energica	1:48.975	**1:46.928**
NC	9	(Italy) Andrea Mantovani	Energica		**1:50.521**
OFFICIAL MOTOE COMBINED FREE PRACTICE TIMES REPORT

== Qualifying ==
=== MotoGP ===
Fastest session lap

Pos.	No.	Biker	Constructor	Qualifying times		Final grid	Row
Pos.	No.	Biker	Constructor	Q1	Q2	Final grid	Row
1	63	(Italy) Francesco Bagnaia	Ducati	Qualified in Q2	1:30.450	1	1
2	43	(Australia) Jack Miller	Ducati	Qualified in Q2	1:30.519	2	1
3	41	(Spain) Aleix Espargaró	Aprilia	Qualified in Q2	1:30.609	3	1
4	20	(France) Fabio Quartararo	Yamaha	Qualified in Q2	1:30.688	4	2
5	23	(Italy) Enea Bastianini	Ducati	Qualified in Q2	1:30.711	5	2
6	5	(France) Johann Zarco	Ducati	Qualified in Q2	1:30.863	6	2
7	36	(Spain) Joan Mir	Suzuki	1:30.933	1:30.943	7	3
8	42	(Spain) Álex Rins	Suzuki	Qualified in Q2	1:30.977	8	3
9	89	(Spain) Jorge Martín	Ducati	1:30:804	1:31.068	9	3
10	93	(Spain) Marc Márquez	Honda	Qualified in Q2	1:31.148	10	4
11	44	(Spain) Pol Espargaró	Honda	Qualified in Q2	1:31.526	11	4
12	30	(Japan) Takaaki Nakagami	Honda	Qualified in Q2	1:31.595	12	4
13	72	(Italy) Marco Bezzecchi	Ducati	1:30.940	N/A	13	5
14	12	(Spain) Maverick Viñales	Aprilia	1:31.271	N/A	14	5
15	10	(Italy) Luca Marini	Ducati	1:31.363	N/A	15	5
16	49	(Italy) Fabio Di Giannantonio	Ducati	1:31.487	N/A	16	6
17	88	(Portugal) Miguel Oliveira	KTM	1:31.547	N/A	17	6
18	33	(South Africa) Brad Binder	KTM	1:31.610	N/A	18	6
19	21	(Italy) Franco Morbidelli	Yamaha	1:31.617	N/A	19	7
20	4	(Italy) Andrea Dovizioso	Yamaha	1:31.618	N/A	20	7
21	73	(Spain) Álex Márquez	Honda	1:31.763	N/A	21	7
22	87	(Australia) Remy Gardner	KTM	1:31.820	N/A	22	8
23	40	(South Africa) Darryn Binder	Yamaha	1:32.596	N/A	23	8
24	25	(Spain) Raúl Fernández	KTM	1:32.767	N/A	24	8
OFFICIAL MOTOGP QUALIFYING RESULTS

=== Moto2 ===
Fastest session lap

Pos.	No.	Biker	Constructor	Qualifying times		Final grid	Row
Pos.	No.	Biker	Constructor	Q1	Q2	Final grid	Row
1	51	(Spain) Pedro Acosta	Kalex	Qualified in Q2	1:35.803	1	1
2	96	(United Kingdom) Jake Dixon	Kalex	Qualified in Q2	1:35.921	2	1
3	37	(Spain) Augusto Fernández	Kalex	Qualified in Q2	1:35.963	3	1
4	22	(United Kingdom) Sam Lowes	Kalex	Qualified in Q2	1:36.071	Did not start	
5	75	(Spain) Albert Arenas	Kalex	Qualified in Q2	1:36.088	4	2
6	21	(Spain) Alonso López	Boscoscuro	Qualified in Q2	1:36.269	5	2
7	40	(Spain) Arón Canet	Kalex	Qualified in Q2	1:36.303	6	2
8	79	(Japan) Ai Ogura	Kalex	Qualified in Q2	1:36.309	7	3
9	64	(Netherlands) Bo Bendsneyder	Kalex	1:36.297	1:36.341	8	3
10	14	(Italy) Tony Arbolino	Kalex	Qualified in Q2	1:36.351	9	3
11	35	(Thailand) Somkiat Chantra	Kalex	Qualified in Q2	1:36.461	10	4
12	9	(Spain) Jorge Navarro	Kalex	1:36.304	1:36.472	11	4
13	23	(Germany) Marcel Schrötter	Kalex	Qualified in Q2	1:36.502	12	4
14	42	(Spain) Marcos Ramírez	MV Agusta	Qualified in Q2	1:36.743	13	5
15	19	(Italy) Lorenzo Dalla Porta	Kalex	1:36.259	1:36.962	14	5
16	62	(Italy) Stefano Manzi	Kalex	Qualified in Q2	1:36.979	15	5
17	6	(United States) Cameron Beaubier	Kalex	Qualified in Q2	1:37.037	16	6
18	54	(Spain) Fermín Aldeguer	Boscoscuro	1:36.278	1:37.098	17	6
19	13	(Italy) Celestino Vietti	Kalex	1:36.310	N/A	18	6
20	2	(Argentina) Gabriel Rodrigo	Kalex	1:36.434	N/A	19	7
21	24	(Italy) Simone Corsi	MV Agusta	1:36.478	N/A	20	7
22	7	(Belgium) Barry Baltus	Kalex	1:36.528	N/A	21	7
23	12	(Czech Republic) Filip Salač	Kalex	1:36.599	N/A	22	8
24	18	(Spain) Manuel González	Kalex	1:36.623	N/A	23	8
25	16	(United States) Joe Roberts	Kalex	1:36.766	N/A	24	8
26	84	(Netherlands) Zonta van den Goorbergh	Kalex	1:37.031	N/A	25	9
27	52	(Spain) Jeremy Alcoba	Kalex	1:37.105	N/A	26	9
28	28	(Italy) Niccolò Antonelli	Kalex	1:37.422	N/A	27	9
29	61	(Italy) Alessandro Zaccone	Kalex	1:37.778	N/A	28	10
30	4	(United States) Sean Dylan Kelly	Kalex	1:38.454	N/A	29	10
OFFICIAL MOTO2 QUALIFYING RESULTS

=== Moto3 ===
Fastest session lap

Pos.	No.	Biker	Constructor	Qualifying times		Final grid	Row
Pos.	No.	Biker	Constructor	Q1	Q2	Final grid	Row
1	7	(Italy) Dennis Foggia	Honda	Qualified in Q2	1:41.621	1	1
2	24	(Japan) Tatsuki Suzuki	Honda	Qualified in Q2	1:41.772	2	1
3	5	(Spain) Jaume Masià	KTM	Qualified in Q2	1:41.778	3	1
4	10	(Brazil) Diogo Moreira	KTM	Qualified in Q2	1:41.879	4	2
5	99	(Spain) Carlos Tatay	CFMoto	Qualified in Q2	1:41.961	5	2
6	16	(Italy) Andrea Migno	Honda	Qualified in Q2	1:41.989	6	2
7	11	(Spain) Sergio García	Gas Gas	Qualified in Q2	1:41.999	7	3
8	28	(Spain) Izan Guevara	Gas Gas	Qualified in Q2	1:42.024	8	3
9	54	(Italy) Riccardo Rossi	Honda	1:42.643	1:42.026	9	3
10	53	(Turkey) Deniz Öncü	KTM	1:42.475	1:42.046	10	4
11	66	(Australia) Joel Kelso	KTM	Qualified in Q2	1:42.099	11	4
12	71	(Japan) Ayumu Sasaki	Husqvarna	Qualified in Q2	1:42.252	12	4
13	6	(Japan) Ryusei Yamanaka	KTM	Qualified in Q2	1:42.276	13	5
14	96	(Spain) Daniel Holgado	KTM	Qualified in Q2	1:42.439	14	5
15	43	(Spain) Xavier Artigas	CFMoto	Qualified in Q2	1:42.479	15	5
16	20	(France) Lorenzo Fellon	Honda	1:42.559	1:42.533	16	6
17	17	(United Kingdom) John McPhee	Husqvarna	Qualified in Q2	1:42.581	17	6
18	18	(Italy) Matteo Bertelle	KTM	1:42.605	1:42.657	18	6
19	23	(Italy) Elia Bartolini	KTM	1:42.712	N/A	19	7
20	19	(United Kingdom) Scott Ogden	Honda	1:42.821	N/A	20	7
21	31	(Spain) Adrián Fernández	KTM	1:42.851	N/A	21	7
22	82	(Italy) Stefano Nepa	KTM	1:42.874	N/A	22	8
23	27	(Japan) Kaito Toba	KTM	1:42.919	N/A	23	8
24	98	(Spain) José Antonio Rueda	Honda	1:43.173	N/A	24	8
25	48	(Spain) Iván Ortolá	KTM	1:43.323	N/A	25	9
26	72	(Japan) Taiyo Furusato	Honda	1:43.512	N/A	26	9
27	87	(Spain) Gerard Riu	KTM	1:43.537	N/A	27	9
28	64	(Indonesia) Mario Aji	Honda	1:43.707	N/A	28	10
29	70	(United Kingdom) Joshua Whatley	Honda	1:44.689	N/A	29	10
30	22	(Spain) Ana Carrasco	KTM	1:44.763	N/A	30	10
OFFICIAL MOTO3 QUALIFYING RESULTS

=== MotoE ===
Fastest session lap

Pos.	No.	Biker	Constructor	Qualifying times		Final grid	Row
Pos.	No.	Biker	Constructor	Q1	Q2	Final grid	Row
1	27	(Italy) Mattia Casadei	Energica	1:44.055	1:43.559	1	1
2	77	(Switzerland) Dominique Aegerter	Energica	Qualified in Q2	1:43.560	2	1
3	21	(Italy) Kevin Zannoni	Energica	Qualified in Q2	1:43.580	3	1
4	51	(Brazil) Eric Granado	Energica	Qualified in Q2	1:43.782	4	2
5	40	(Spain) Jordi Torres	Energica	Qualified in Q2	1:43.862	5	2
6	16	(Japan) Hikari Okubo	Energica	1:44.327	1:43.872	6	2
7	11	(Italy) Matteo Ferrari	Energica	Qualified in Q2	1:44.064	7	3
8	7	(Italy) Niccolò Canepa	Energica	Qualified in Q2	1:44.267	8	3
9	18	(Andorra) Xavi Cardelús	Energica	Qualified in Q2	1:44.464	9	3
10	12	(Spain) Xavi Forés	Energica	Qualified in Q2	1:44.801	10	4
11	17	(Spain) Álex Escrig	Energica	1:44.371	N/A	11	4
12	4	(Spain) Héctor Garzó	Energica	1:44.388	N/A	12	4
13	70	(Spain) Marc Alcoba	Energica	1:44.485	N/A	13	5
14	71	(Spain) Miquel Pons	Energica	1:44.571	N/A	14	5
15	6	(Spain) María Herrera	Energica	1:45.189	N/A	15	5
16	9	(Italy) Andrea Mantovani	Energica	1:45.617	N/A	16	6
17	34	(Italy) Kevin Manfredi	Energica	1:45.767	N/A	17	6
18	72	(Italy) Alessio Finello	Energica	1:45.974	N/A	18	6
OFFICIAL MOTOE Starting Grid

== Warm up ==
=== MotoGP ===
Aleix Espargaró was the fastest, followed by Fabio Quartararo and Takaaki Nakagami.

=== Moto2 ===
Pedro Acosta preceded Jake Dixon and Augusto Fernández.

=== Moto3 ===
The first three positions were conquered by Jaume Masià, Daniel Holgado and Diogo Moreira.

== Race ==
=== MotoGP ===
Pos.	No.	Biker	Team	Constructor	Laps	Time/Retired	Grid	Points
1	23	(Italy) Enea Bastianini	Gresini Racing MotoGP	Ducati	27	41:34.613	5	25
2	43	(Australia) Jack Miller	Ducati Lenovo Team	Ducati	27	+2.718	2	20
3	41	(Spain) Aleix Espargaró	Aprilia Racing	Aprilia	27	+4.182	3	16
4	20	(France) Fabio Quartararo	Monster Energy Yamaha MotoGP	Yamaha	27	+4.288	4	13
5	5	(France) Johann Zarco	Pramac Racing	Ducati	27	+11.139	9	11
6	93	(Spain) Marc Márquez	Repsol Honda Team	Honda	27	+15.155	10	10
7	30	(Japan) Takaaki Nakagami	LCR Honda Idemitsu	Honda	27	+16.680	12	9
8	33	(South Africa) Brad Binder	Red Bull KTM Factory Racing	KTM	27	+18.459	18	8
9	10	(Italy) Luca Marini	Mooney VR46 Racing Team	Ducati	27	+20.541	15	7
10	12	(Spain) Maverick Viñales	Aprilia Racing	Aprilia	27	+21.486	14	6
11	44	(Spain) Pol Espargaró	Repsol Honda Team	Honda	27	+22.707	11	5
12	72	(Italy) Marco Bezzecchi	Mooney VR46 Racing Team	Ducati	27	+23.408	13	4
13	49	(Italy) Fabio Di Giannantonio	Gresini Racing MotoGP	Ducati	27	+26.432	16	3
14	73	(Spain) Álex Márquez	LCR Honda Castrol	Honda	27	+28.710	21	2
15	21	(Italy) Franco Morbidelli	Monster Energy Yamaha MotoGP	Yamaha	27	+29.433	19	1
16	4	(Italy) Andrea Dovizioso	WithU Yamaha RNF MotoGP Team	Yamaha	27	+38.149	20	
17	40	(South Africa) Darryn Binder	WithU Yamaha RNF MotoGP Team	Yamaha	27	+59.748	23	
Ret	88	(Portugal) Miguel Oliveira	Red Bull KTM Factory Racing	KTM	24	Accident	17	
Ret	63	(Italy) Francesco Bagnaia	Ducati Lenovo Team	Ducati	20	Accident	1	
Ret	89	(Spain) Jorge Martín	Pramac Racing	Ducati	16	Accident	8	
Ret	36	(Spain) Joan Mir	Team Suzuki Ecstar	Suzuki	13	Accident	6	
Ret	25	(Spain) Raúl Fernández	Tech3 KTM Factory Racing	KTM	6	Accident	24	
Ret	42	(Spain) Álex Rins	Team Suzuki Ecstar	Suzuki	5	Accident Damage	7	
Ret	87	(Australia) Remy Gardner	Tech3 KTM Factory Racing	KTM	3	Accident	22	
Fastest lap: (Italy) Francesco Bagnaia (Ducati) – 1:31.778 (lap 4)
OFFICIAL MOTOGP RACE REPORT

=== Moto2 ===
Pos.	No.	Biker	Constructor	Laps	Time/Retired	Grid	Points
1	37	(Spain) Augusto Fernández	Kalex	25	40:31.726	3	25
2	40	(Spain) Arón Canet	Kalex	25	+3.746	6	20
3	35	(Thailand) Somkiat Chantra	Kalex	25	+4.628	10	16
4	6	(United States) Cameron Beaubier	Kalex	25	+4.745	16	13
5	79	(Japan) Ai Ogura	Kalex	25	+15.376	7	11
6	23	(Germany) Marcel Schrötter	Kalex	25	+17.547	12	10
7	16	(United States) Joe Roberts	Kalex	25	+19.035	24	9
8	13	(Italy) Celestino Vietti	Kalex	25	+19.854	18	8
9	9	(Spain) Jorge Navarro	Kalex	25	+20.766	11	7
10	62	(Italy) Stefano Manzi	Kalex	25	+20.879	15	6
11	18	(Spain) Manuel González	Kalex	25	+21.381	23	5
12	19	(Italy) Lorenzo Dalla Porta	Kalex	25	+23.892	14	4
13	52	(Spain) Jeremy Alcoba	Kalex	25	+26.881	26	3
14	64	(Netherlands) Bo Bendsneyder	Kalex	25	+26.952	8	2
15	12	(Czech Republic) Filip Salač	Kalex	25	+32.063	22	1
16	24	(Italy) Simone Corsi	MV Agusta	25	+36.712	20	
17	84	(Netherlands) Zonta van den Goorbergh	Kalex	25	+50.822	25	
18	61	(Italy) Alessandro Zaccone	Kalex	25	+59.561	28	
19	75	(Spain) Albert Arenas	Kalex	24	+1 lap	4	
20	4	(United States) Sean Dylan Kelly	Kalex	23	+2 laps	29	
21	96	(United Kingdom) Jake Dixon	Kalex	23	+2 laps	2	
Ret	7	(Belgium) Barry Baltus	Kalex	19	Accident	21	
Ret	42	(Spain) Marcos Ramírez	MV Agusta	12	Accident	13	
Ret	51	(Spain) Pedro Acosta	Kalex	10	Accident	1	
Ret	2	(Argentina) Gabriel Rodrigo	Kalex	9	Accident	19	
Ret	21	(Spain) Alonso Lopez	Boscoscuro	6	Accident Damage	5	
Ret	14	(Italy) Tony Arbolino	Kalex	1	Accident	9	
Ret	54	(Spain) Fermín Aldeguer	Boscoscuro	1	Accident	17	
Ret	28	(Italy) Niccolò Antonelli	Kalex	0	Accident	27	
DNS	22	(United Kingdom) Sam Lowes	Kalex		Did not start		
Fastest lap: (Spain) Augusto Fernández (Kalex) – 1:36.276 (lap 5)
OFFICIAL MOTO2 RACE REPORT

- Sam Lowes was declared unfit to compete following a crash in qualifying.

=== Moto3 ===
The race, scheduled to be run for 22 laps, was red-flagged after 2 full laps due to a multi-rider incident involving a total of nine riders amid bad weather conditions. The race was later restarted over 14 laps with the original starting grid determined. Thus, all crashed riders were eligible to join the restart.

Pos.	No.	Biker	Constructor	Laps	Time/Retired	Grid	Points
1	5	(Spain) Jaume Masià	KTM	14	24:04.119	3	25
2	71	(Japan) Ayumu Sasaki	Husqvarna	14	+0.150	11	20
3	28	(Spain) Izan Guevara	Gas Gas	14	+0.220	8	16
4	7	(Italy) Dennis Foggia	Honda	14	+0.322	1	13
5	24	(Japan) Tatsuki Suzuki	Honda	14	+0.529	2	11
6	99	(Spain) Carlos Tatay	CFMoto	14	+1.594	5	10
7	11	(Spain) Sergio García	Gas Gas	14	+2.007	7	9
8	6	(Japan) Ryusei Yamanaka	KTM	14	+2.275	12	8
9	53	(Turkey) Deniz Öncü	KTM	14	+2.502	10	7
10	16	(Italy) Andrea Migno	Honda	14	+2.917	6	6
11	96	(Spain) Daniel Holgado	KTM	14	+3.025	13	5
12	17	(United Kingdom) John McPhee	Husqvarna	14	+3.193	16	4
13	54	(Italy) Riccardo Rossi	Honda	14	+3.330	9	3
14	10	(Brazil) Diogo Moreira	KTM	14	+7.993	4	2
15	27	(Japan) Kaito Toba	KTM	14	+9.981	22	1
16	23	(Italy) Elia Bartolini	KTM	14	+10.134	18	
17	82	(Italy) Stefano Nepa	KTM	14	+10.444	21	
18	48	(Spain) Iván Ortolá	KTM	14	+10.530	24	
19	18	(Italy) Matteo Bertelle	KTM	14	+10.812	17	
20	31	(Spain) Adrián Fernández	KTM	14	+12.382	20	
21	98	(Spain) José Antonio Rueda	Honda	14	+12.435	23	
22	64	(Indonesia) Mario Aji	Honda	14	+12.552	27	
23	20	(France) Lorenzo Fellon	Honda	14	+12.697	15	
24	87	(Spain) Gerard Riu	KTM	14	+17.016	26	
25	72	(Japan) Taiyo Furusato	Honda	14	+26.961	25	
26	70	(United Kingdom) Joshua Whatley	Honda	14	+27.278	28	
27	22	(Spain) Ana Carrasco	KTM	14	+32.200	29	
Ret	43	(Spain) Xavier Artigas	CFMoto	11	Accident	14	
Ret	19	(United Kingdom) Scott Ogden	Honda	3	Accident	19	
DNS	66	(Australia) Joel Kelso	KTM		Did not start		
Fastest lap: (Spain) Izan Guevara (Gas Gas) – 1:42.081 (lap 12)
OFFICIAL MOTO3 RACE REPORT

- Joel Kelso withdrew from the event due to effects of leg injury suffered during Spanish Grand Prix warm-up.

=== MotoE ===
==== Race 1 ====
Pos.	No.	Biker	Laps	Time/Retired	Grid	Points
1	27	(Italy) Mattia Casadei	8	13:54.984	1	25
2	77	(Switzerland) Dominique Aegerter	8	+0.862	2	20
3	78	(Japan) Hikari Okubo	8	+1.223	6	16
4	11	(Italy) Matteo Ferrari	8	+1.701	7	13
5	4	(Spain) Héctor Garzó	8	+5.754	12	11
6	71	(Spain) Miquel Pons	8	+6.389	14	10
7	51	(Brazil) Eric Granado	8	+6.918	4	9
8	7	(Italy) Niccolò Canepa	8	+7.108	8	8
9	9	(Italy) Andrea Mantovani	8	+8.584	16	7
10	17	(Spain) Álex Escrig	8	+8.713	11	6
11	18	(Andorra) Xavi Cardelús	8	+10.395	9	5
12	12	(Spain) Xavi Forés	8	+11.102	10	4
13	34	(Italy) Kevin Manfredi	8	+11.727	17	3
14	6	(Spain) María Herrera	8	+12.981	15	2
15	72	(Italy) Alessio Finello	8	+22.125	18	1
16	21	(Italy) Kevin Zannoni	8	+40.637	3	
Ret	70	(Spain) Marc Alcoba	2	Accident	13	
Ret	40	(Spain) Jordi Torres	0	Accident	5	
Fastest lap: (Italy) Mattia Casadei – 1:43.474 (lap 2)
OFFICIAL MOTOE RACE NR.1 REPORT

- All bikes manufactured by Energica.

==== Race 2 ====
Pos.	No.	Biker	Laps	Time/Retired	Grid	Points
1	77	(Switzerland) Dominique Aegerter	8	14:36.988	2	25
2	27	(Italy) Mattia Casadei	8	+0.567	1	20
3	7	(Italy) Niccolò Canepa	8	+1.688	7	16
4	21	(Italy) Kevin Zannoni	8	+1.696	3	13
5	51	(Brazil) Eric Granado	8	+1.831	4	11
6	78	(Japan) Hikari Okubo	8	+2.181	5	10
7	11	(Italy) Matteo Ferrari	8	+2.297	6	9
8	4	(Spain) Héctor Garzó	8	+2.966	11	8
9	70	(Spain) Marc Alcoba	2	+3.961	12	7
10	71	(Spain) Miquel Pons	8	+4.210	13	6
11	9	(Italy) Andrea Mantovani	8	+4.419	15	5
12	17	(Spain) Álex Escrig	8	+4.911	10	4
13	12	(Spain) Xavi Forés	8	+6.158	9	3
14	18	(Andorra) Xavi Cardelús	8	+6.887	8	2
15	6	(Spain) María Herrera	8	+9.802	14	1
16	34	(Italy) Kevin Manfredi	8	+10.296	16	
17	72	(Italy) Alessio Finello	8	+19.456	17	
DNS	40	(Spain) Jordi Torres		Did not start		
Fastest lap: (Italy) Andrea Mantovani – 1:43.551 (lap 4)
OFFICIAL MOTOE RACE NR.2 REPORT

- All bikes manufactured by Energica.

== Championship standings after the race ==
Below are the standings for the top five riders, constructors, and teams after the round.

=== MotoGP ===
Riders' Championship standings

	Pos.	Rider	Points
	1	(France) Fabio Quartararo	102
	2	(Spain) Aleix Espargaró	98
	3	(Italy) Enea Bastianini	94
	4	(Spain) Álex Rins	69
6	5	(Australia) Jack Miller	62

Constructors' Championship standings

	Pos.	Constructor	Points
	1	(Italy) Ducati	156
	2	(Japan) Yamaha	102
	3	(Italy) Aprilia	99
1	4	(Austria) KTM	84
1	5	(Japan) Suzuki	80

Teams' Championship standings

	Pos.	Team	Points
1	1	(Italy) Aprilia Racing	131
1	2	(Japan) Team Suzuki Ecstar	125
	3	(Japan) Monster Energy Yamaha MotoGP	121
	4	(Italy) Ducati Lenovo Team	118
	5	(Austria) Red Bull KTM Factory Racing	99

=== Moto2 ===
Riders' Championship standings

	Pos.	Rider	Points
	1	(Italy) Celestino Vietti	108
	2	(Japan) Ai Ogura	92
1	3	(Spain) Arón Canet	89
1	4	(Italy) Tony Arbolino	70
4	5	(Spain) Augusto Fernández	69

Constructors' Championship standings

Pos.	Constructor	Points
1	(Germany) Kalex	175
2	(Italy) Boscoscuro	20
3	(Italy) MV Agusta	5

Teams' Championship standings

	Pos.	Team	Points
	1	(Japan) Idemitsu Honda Team Asia	153
	2	(Spain) Flexbox HP40	141
1	3	(Italy) Mooney VR46 Racing Team	108
1	4	(Belgium) Elf Marc VDS Racing Team	105
1	5	(Finland) Red Bull KTM Ajo	89

=== Moto3 ===
Riders' Championship standings

	Pos.	Rider	Points
	1	(Spain) Sergio García	112
2	2	(Spain) Jaume Masià	95
1	3	(Italy) Dennis Foggia	95
1	4	(Spain) Izan Guevara	89
1	5	(Japan) Ayumu Sasaki	75

Constructors' Championship standings

	Pos.	Constructor	Points
	1	(Spain) Gas Gas	140
1	2	(Austria) KTM	123
1	3	(Japan) Honda	116
	4	(Sweden) Husqvarna	86
	5	(China) CFMoto	71

Teams' Championship standings

	Pos.	Team	Points
	1	(Spain) Gaviota GasGas Aspar Team	201
	2	(Luxembourg) Leopard Racing	133
	3	(Finland) Red Bull KTM Ajo	123
2	4	(Italy) Sterilgarda Husqvarna Max	90
1	5	(Germany) CFMoto Racing Prüstel GP	89

=== MotoE ===
	Pos.	Rider	Points
1	1	(Switzerland) Dominique Aegerter	78
1	2	(Brazil) Eric Granado	70
5	3	(Italy) Mattia Casadei	61
	4	(Italy) Matteo Ferrari	48
	5	(Japan) Hikari Okubo	47

Previous race: 2022 Spanish Grand Prix	FIM Grand Prix World Championship; 2022 season	Next race: 2022 Italian Grand Prix
Previous race: 2021 French Grand Prix	French motorcycle Grand Prix	Next race: 2023 French Grand Prix
