= 2021 Motorcycle Grand Prix of the Americas =

Fifteenth round of the 2021 Grand Prix motorcycle racing season

(United States) 2021 Grand Prix of the Americas
Race details
- Race 15 of 18 races in the 2021 Grand Prix motorcycle racing season
- Date: October 3, 2021
- Official name: Red Bull Grand Prix of the Americas
- Location: Circuit of the Americas; Austin, Texas
- Course: Permanent racing facility; 5.513 km (3.426 mi)

MotoGP
Pole position
Rider	(Italy) Francesco Bagnaia	Ducati
Time	2:02.781	
Fastest lap
Rider	(Spain) Marc Márquez	Honda
Time	2:04.368 on lap 7	
Podium
First	(Spain) Marc Márquez	Honda
Second	(France) Fabio Quartararo	Yamaha
Third	(Italy) Francesco Bagnaia	Ducati

Moto2
Pole position
Rider	(Spain) Raúl Fernández	Kalex
Time	2:08.979	
Fastest lap
Rider	(Spain) Raúl Fernández	Kalex
Time	2:09.794 on lap 2	
Podium
First	(Spain) Raúl Fernández	Kalex
Second	(Italy) Fabio Di Giannantonio	Kalex
Third	(Italy) Marco Bezzecchi	Kalex

Moto3
Pole position
Rider	(Spain) Jaume Masià	KTM
Time	2:15.986	
Fastest lap
Rider	(Japan) Tatsuki Suzuki	Honda
Time	2:16.172 on lap 7	
Podium
First	(Spain) Izan Guevara	Gas Gas
Second	(Italy) Dennis Foggia	Honda
Third	(United Kingdom) John McPhee	Honda

The 2021 Motorcycle Grand Prix of the Americas (officially known as the Red Bull Grand Prix of the Americas) was the fifteenth round of the 2021 Grand Prix motorcycle racing season. It was held at the Circuit of the Americas in Austin on October 3, 2021.

The race weekend was notable for its Moto3 race, with the race being red-flagged twice due to two separate incidents, involving Filip Salač, Deniz Öncü, Andrea Migno, Jeremy Alcoba and Pedro Acosta. The final results have been taken into account after seven completed laps. Unlike Salač, the other riders were classified, despite the red flag.

As a consequence, Öncü was banned from the next two rounds as he was deemed responsible for causing the second red flag from race direction. However, Izan Guevara took his first victory on Grand Prix motorcycling level.

== Background ==
The event returned after a one-year absence due to the COVID-19 pandemic. It was originally scheduled for 18 April, but was postponed on 22 January along with the Argentine Grand Prix due to travel restrictions related to the COVID-19 pandemic, and was replaced by the Portuguese Grand Prix. On 23 June, the event was rescheduled for 3 October following the cancellation of the Japanese Grand Prix.

== Qualifying ==
=== MotoGP ===
Fastest session lap

Pos.	No.	Biker	Constructor	Qualifying times		Final grid	Row
Pos.	No.	Biker	Constructor	Q1	Q2	Final grid	Row
1	63	(Italy) Francesco Bagnaia	Ducati	Qualified in Q2	2:02.781	1	1
2	20	(France) Fabio Quartararo	Yamaha	Qualified in Q2	2:03.129	2	1
3	93	(Spain) Marc Márquez	Honda	Qualified in Q2	2:03.209	3	1
4	89	(Spain) Jorge Martín	Ducati	Qualified in Q2	2:03.278	4	2
5	30	(Japan) Takaaki Nakagami	Honda	Qualified in Q2	2:03.292	5	2
6	5	(France) Johann Zarco	Ducati	Qualified in Q2	2:03.379	6	2
7	42	(Spain) Álex Rins	Suzuki	Qualified in Q2	2:03.453	7	3
8	36	(Spain) Joan Mir	Suzuki	2:03.540	2:03.528	8	3
9	10	(Italy) Luca Marini	Ducati	2:03.410	2:03.546	9	3
10	43	(Australia) Jack Miller	Ducati	Qualified in Q2	2:03.720	10	4
11	33	(South Africa) Brad Binder	KTM	Qualified in Q2	2:03.781	11	4
12	44	(Spain) Pol Espargaró	Honda	Qualified in Q2	2:03.875	12	4
13	21	(Italy) Franco Morbidelli	Yamaha	2:03.872	N/A	13	5
14	4	(Italy) Andrea Dovizioso	Yamaha	2:04.044	N/A	14	5
15	73	(Spain) Álex Márquez	Honda	2:04.100	N/A	15	5
16	23	(Italy) Enea Bastianini	Ducati	2:04.118	N/A	16	6
17	27	(Spain) Iker Lecuona	KTM	2:04.324	N/A	17	6
18	88	(Portugal) Miguel Oliveira	KTM	2:04.392	N/A	18	6
19	41	(Spain) Aleix Espargaró	Aprilia	2:04.419	N/A	19	7
20	46	(Italy) Valentino Rossi	Yamaha	2:04.699	N/A	20	7
21	9	(Italy) Danilo Petrucci	KTM	2:04.829	N/A	21	7
OFFICIAL MOTOGP QUALIFYING RESULTS

== Race ==
=== MotoGP ===
Pos.	No.	Rider	Team	Manufacturer	Laps	Time/Retired	Grid	Points
1	93	(Spain) Marc Márquez	Repsol Honda Team	Honda	20	41:41.435	3	25
2	20	(France) Fabio Quartararo	Monster Energy Yamaha MotoGP	Yamaha	20	+4.679	2	20
3	63	(Italy) Francesco Bagnaia	Ducati Lenovo Team	Ducati	20	+8.547	1	16
4	42	(Spain) Álex Rins	Team Suzuki Ecstar	Suzuki	20	+11.098	7	13
5	89	(Spain) Jorge Martín	Pramac Racing	Ducati	20	+11.752	4	11
6	23	(Italy) Enea Bastianini	Avintia Esponsorama	Ducati	20	+13.269	16	10
7	43	(Australia) Jack Miller	Ducati Lenovo Team	Ducati	20	+14.722	10	9
8 (Note: 1-position penalty for irresponsible riding.)	36	(Spain) Joan Mir	Team Suzuki Ecstar	Suzuki	20	+13.406	8	8
9	33	(South Africa) Brad Binder	Red Bull KTM Factory Racing	KTM	20	+15.832	11	7
10	44	(Spain) Pol Espargaró	Repsol Honda Team	Honda	20	+20.265	12	6
11	88	(Portugal) Miguel Oliveira	Red Bull KTM Factory Racing	KTM	20	+23.055	18	5
12	73	(Spain) Álex Márquez	LCR Honda Castrol	Honda	20	+24.743	15	4
13	04	(Italy) Andrea Dovizioso	Petronas Yamaha SRT	Yamaha	20	+25.307	14	3
14	10	(Italy) Luca Marini	Sky VR46 Avintia	Ducati	20	+26.853	9	2
15	46	(Italy) Valentino Rossi	Petronas Yamaha SRT	Yamaha	20	+28.055	20	1
16	27	(Spain) Iker Lecuona	Tech3 KTM Factory Racing	KTM	20	+30.989	17	
17	30	(Japan) Takaaki Nakagami	LCR Honda Idemitsu	Honda	20	+35.251	5	
18	9	(Italy) Danilo Petrucci	Tech3 KTM Factory Racing	KTM	20	+42.239	21	
19	21	(Italy) Franco Morbidelli	Monster Energy Yamaha MotoGP	Yamaha	20	+49.854	13	
Ret	41	(Spain) Aleix Espargaró	Aprilia Racing Team Gresini	Aprilia	8	Accident	19	
Ret	5	(France) Johann Zarco	Pramac Racing	Ducati	5	Accident Damage	6	
Fastest lap: (Spain) Marc Márquez (Honda) – 2:04.368 (lap 7)

=== Moto2 ===
Pos.	No.	Rider	Manufacturer	Laps	Time/Retired	Grid	Points
1	25	(Spain) Raúl Fernández	Kalex	18	39:10.521	1	25
2	21	(Italy) Fabio Di Giannantonio	Kalex	18	+1.734	3	20
3	72	(Italy) Marco Bezzecchi	Kalex	18	+3.100	4	16
4	37	(Spain) Augusto Fernández	Kalex	18	+4.061	6	13
5	6	(United States) Cameron Beaubier	Kalex	18	+5.381	5	11
6	14	(Italy) Tony Arbolino	Kalex	18	+7.577	7	10
7	79	(Japan) Ai Ogura	Kalex	18	+11.087	8	9
8	97	(Spain) Xavi Vierge	Kalex	18	+14.949	12	8
9	42	(Spain) Marcos Ramírez	Kalex	18	+16.051	11	7
10	96	(United Kingdom) Jake Dixon	Kalex	18	+18.278	13	6
11	44	(Spain) Arón Canet	Boscoscuro	18	+20.679	14	5
12	9	(Spain) Jorge Navarro	Boscoscuro	18	+22.738	17	4
13	24	(Italy) Simone Corsi	MV Agusta	18	+22.913	18	3
14	35	(Thailand) Somkiat Chantra	Kalex	18	+23.247	15	2
15 (Note: 1-position penalty for exceeding track limits on the last lap.)	64	(Netherlands) Bo Bendsneyder	Kalex	18	+23.108	23	1
16	45	(Japan) Tetsuta Nagashima	Kalex	18	+27.006	21	
17	70	(Belgium) Barry Baltus	NTS	18	+28.086	24	
18	16	(United States) Joe Roberts	Kalex	18	+32.719	26	
19	62	(Italy) Stefano Manzi	Kalex	18	+37.542	22	
20	55	(Malaysia) Hafizh Syahrin	NTS	18	+39.658	27	
21	54	(Spain) Fermín Aldeguer	Boscoscuro	18	+40.685	25	
22	7	(Italy) Lorenzo Baldassarri	MV Agusta	18	+47.168	29	
Ret	13	(Italy) Celestino Vietti	Kalex	14	Accident	10	
Ret	23	(Germany) Marcel Schrötter	Kalex	13	Electronics	19	
Ret	75	(Spain) Albert Arenas	Boscoscuro	11	Accident	9	
Ret	40	(Spain) Héctor Garzó	Kalex	10	Handling	20	
Ret	22	(United Kingdom) Sam Lowes	Kalex	9	Misfire	16	
Ret	87	(Australia) Remy Gardner	Kalex	5	Accident	2	
Ret	12	(Switzerland) Thomas Lüthi	Kalex	2	Accident	28	
DNS	11	(Italy) Nicolò Bulega	Kalex		Did not start		
OFFICIAL MOTO2 RACE REPORT

- Nicolò Bulega was declared unfit to compete due to a leg bruise suffered in crash during free practice.

=== Moto3 ===
The race, scheduled to be run for 17 laps, was red-flagged after 7 full laps due to an accident involving Filip Salač. The race was later restarted over 5 laps but red-flagged again due to an accident involving multiple riders two laps after the restart. The race was not restarted, final results were determined by the first part and full points were awarded as the second part had been short of the required three completed laps.

Pos.	No.	Rider	Manufacturer	Laps	Time/Retired	Grid	Points
1	28	(Spain) Izan Guevara	Gas Gas	7	15:57.747	4	25
2	7	(Italy) Dennis Foggia	Honda	7	+0.385	2	20
3	17	(United Kingdom) John McPhee	Honda	7	+0.499	10	16
4	5	(Spain) Jaume Masià	KTM	7	+0.706	1	13
5	53	(Turkey) Deniz Öncü	KTM	7	+1.266	9	11
6	52	(Spain) Jeremy Alcoba	Honda	7	+1.271	3	10
7	40	(South Africa) Darryn Binder	Honda	7	+1.391	17	9
8	37	(Spain) Pedro Acosta	KTM	7	+1.543	15	8
9	24	(Japan) Tatsuki Suzuki	Honda	7	+1.820	6	7
10	16	(Italy) Andrea Migno	Honda	7	+2.480	8	6
11	82	(Italy) Stefano Nepa	KTM	7	+2.683	12	5
12	55	(Italy) Romano Fenati	Husqvarna	7	+3.257	11	4
13	71	(Japan) Ayumu Sasaki	KTM	7	+3.492	14	3
14	43	(Spain) Xavier Artigas	Honda	7	+3.652	5	2
15	23	(Italy) Niccolò Antonelli	KTM	7	+6.086	13	1
16	20	(France) Lorenzo Fellon	Honda	7	+8.944	16	
17	73	(Austria) Maximilian Kofler	KTM	7	+9.529	21	
18	99	(Spain) Carlos Tatay	KTM	7	+9.977	19	
19	67	(Italy) Alberto Surra	Honda	7	+10.130	18	
20	54	(Italy) Riccardo Rossi	KTM	7	+10.536	20	
21	31	(Spain) Adrián Fernández	Husqvarna	7	+14.107	22	
22	6	(Japan) Ryusei Yamanaka	KTM	7	+14.228	23	
23	27	(Japan) Kaito Toba	KTM	7	+14.637	26	
24	19	(Indonesia) Andi Farid Izdihar	Honda	7	+14.794	25	
25	92	(Japan) Yuki Kunii	Honda	7	+14.968	24	
Ret	12	(Czech Republic) Filip Salač	KTM	6	Accident	7	
DNS	11	(Spain) Sergio García	Gas Gas		Did not start		
OFFICIAL MOTO3 RACE REPORT

- Sergio García suffered from kidney hematoma following a crash during free practice and withdrew from the event.

== Championship standings after the race ==
Below are the standings for the top five riders, constructors, and teams after the round.

=== MotoGP ===
Riders' Championship standings

	Pos.	Rider	Points
	1	(France) Fabio Quartararo	254
	2	(Italy) Francesco Bagnaia	202
	3	(Spain) Joan Mir	175
1	4	(Australia) Jack Miller	149
1	5	(France) Johann Zarco	141

Constructors' Championship standings

Pos.	Constructor	Points
1	(Italy) Ducati	291
2	(Japan) Yamaha	282
3	(Japan) Suzuki	197
4	(Austria) KTM	185
5	(Japan) Honda	173

Teams' Championship standings

	Pos.	Team	Points
1	1	(Italy) Ducati Lenovo Team	351
1	2	(Japan) Monster Energy Yamaha MotoGP	349
	3	(Japan) Team Suzuki Ecstar	256
	4	(Italy) Pramac Racing	227
	5	(Austria) Red Bull KTM Factory Racing	223

=== Moto2 ===
Riders' Championship standings

	Pos.	Rider	Points
	1	(Australia) Remy Gardner	271
	2	(Spain) Raúl Fernández	262
	3	(Italy) Marco Bezzecchi	206
	4	(United Kingdom) Sam Lowes	140
1	5	(Spain) Augusto Fernández	131

Constructors' Championship standings

Pos.	Constructor	Points
1	(Germany) Kalex	375
2	(Italy) Boscoscuro	159
3	(Italy) MV Agusta	19
4	(Japan) NTS	10

Teams' Championship standings

	Pos.	Team	Points
	1	(Finland) Red Bull KTM Ajo	533
	2	(Belgium) Elf Marc VDS Racing Team	271
	3	(Italy) Sky Racing Team VR46	259
1	4	(Japan) Idemitsu Honda Team Asia	150
1	5	(Spain) Inde Aspar Team	147

=== Moto3 ===
Riders' Championship standings

Pos.	Rider	Points
1	(Spain) Pedro Acosta	218
2	(Italy) Dennis Foggia	188
3	(Spain) Sergio García	168
4	(Italy) Romano Fenati	138
5	(Spain) Jaume Masiá	135

Constructors' Championship standings

Pos.	Constructor	Points
1	(Austria) KTM	308
2	(Japan) Honda	290
3	(Spain) Gas Gas	231
4	(Sweden) Husqvarna	144

Teams' Championship standings

Pos.	Team	Points
1	(Finland) Red Bull KTM Ajo	353
2	(Spain) Gaviota GasGas Aspar Team	269
3	(Luxembourg) Leopard Racing	220
4	(Malaysia) Petronas Sprinta Racing	198
5	(France) Red Bull KTM Tech3	180

== Notes ==
Previous race: 2021 San Marino Grand Prix	FIM Grand Prix World Championship; 2021 season	Next race: 2021 Emilia Romagna Grand Prix
Previous race: 2019 Grand Prix of the Americas	Motorcycle Grand Prix of the Americas	Next race: 2022 Grand Prix of the Americas
