= Motorcycle Grand Prix of the Americas =

Grand Prix motorcycle race

Grand Prix of the Americas

Grand Prix motorcycle racing
- Venue: Circuit of the Americas (2013–2019, 2021–2025)
- First race: 2013
- Last race: 2025
- Most wins (rider): Marc Márquez (7)
- Most wins (manufacturer): Honda (11)

The Motorcycle Grand Prix of the Americas was a motorcycling event that was part of the FIM Grand Prix motorcycle racing season that took place at Circuit of the Americas. It became the third MotoGP round in the United States, alongside the Indianapolis Grand Prix at the Indianapolis Motor Speedway (which lost its place on the calendar in 2016), and the United States Grand Prix at Mazda Raceway Laguna Seca (which lost its place on the calendar in 2014).

The 2020 race was cancelled due to the outbreak of COVID-19.

For the 2026 race, MotoGP quietly changed the Grand Prix title to the returning United States Grand Prix.

== Official names and sponsors ==
Official race logo

- 2013–2019, 2021–2025: Red Bull Grand Prix of the Americas

== Winners ==
=== Multiple winners (riders) ===
# Wins	Rider	Wins	
# Wins	Rider	Category	Years won
7	(Spain) Marc Márquez	MotoGP	2013, 2014, 2015, 2016, 2017, 2018, 2021
4	(Spain) Álex Rins	MotoGP	2019, 2023
4	(Spain) Álex Rins	Moto2	2016
4	(Spain) Álex Rins	Moto3	2013
2	(Italy) Romano Fenati	Moto3	2016, 2017
2	(Spain) Maverick Viñales	MotoGP	2024
2	(Spain) Maverick Viñales	Moto2	2014
2	(Italy) Francesco Bagnaia	MotoGP	2025
2	(Italy) Francesco Bagnaia	Moto2	2018

=== Multiple winners (manufacturers) ===
# Wins	Manufacturer	Wins	
# Wins	Manufacturer	Category	Years won
11	(Japan) Honda	MotoGP	2013, 2014, 2015, 2016, 2017, 2018, 2021, 2023
11	(Japan) Honda	Moto3	2015, 2017, 2018
8	(Germany) Kalex	Moto2	2014, 2016, 2017, 2018, 2019, 2021, 2022, 2023
7	(Austria) KTM	Moto3	2013, 2014, 2016, 2019, 2022, 2023, 2025
2	(Italy) Boscoscuro	Moto2	2024, 2025
2	(Italy) Ducati	MotoGP	2022, 2025

=== By year ===
Year	Track	Moto3		Moto2		MotoGP		Report
Year	Track	Rider	Manufacturer	Rider	Manufacturer	Rider	Manufacturer	Report
2025	COTA	(Spain) José Antonio Rueda	KTM	(United Kingdom) Jake Dixon	Boscoscuro	(Italy) Francesco Bagnaia	Ducati	Report
2024	COTA	(Colombia) David Alonso	CFMoto	(Spain) Sergio García	Boscoscuro	(Spain) Maverick Viñales	Aprilia	Report
2023	COTA	(Spain) Iván Ortolá	KTM	(Spain) Pedro Acosta	Kalex	(Spain) Álex Rins	Honda	Report
2022	COTA	(Spain) Jaume Masià	KTM	(Italy) Tony Arbolino	Kalex	(Italy) Enea Bastianini	Ducati	Report
2021	COTA	(Spain) Izan Guevara	GasGas	(Spain) Raúl Fernández	Kalex	(Spain) Marc Márquez	Honda	Report
2020	COTA	Cancelled due to COVID-19 concerns						
2019	COTA	(Spain) Arón Canet	KTM	(Switzerland) Thomas Lüthi	Kalex	(Spain) Álex Rins	Suzuki	Report
2018	COTA	(Spain) Jorge Martín	Honda	(Italy) Francesco Bagnaia	Kalex	(Spain) Marc Márquez	Honda	Report
2017	COTA	(Italy) Romano Fenati	Honda	(Italy) Franco Morbidelli	Kalex	(Spain) Marc Márquez	Honda	Report
2016	COTA	(Italy) Romano Fenati	KTM	(Spain) Álex Rins	Kalex	(Spain) Marc Márquez	Honda	Report
2015	COTA	(United Kingdom) Danny Kent	Honda	(United Kingdom) Sam Lowes	Speed Up	(Spain) Marc Márquez	Honda	Report
2014	COTA	(Australia) Jack Miller	KTM	(Spain) Maverick Viñales	Kalex	(Spain) Marc Márquez	Honda	Report
2013	COTA	(Spain) Álex Rins	KTM	(Spain) Nicolás Terol	Suter	(Spain) Marc Márquez	Honda	Report
