= Izan Guevara =

Spanish motorcycle racer (born 2004)

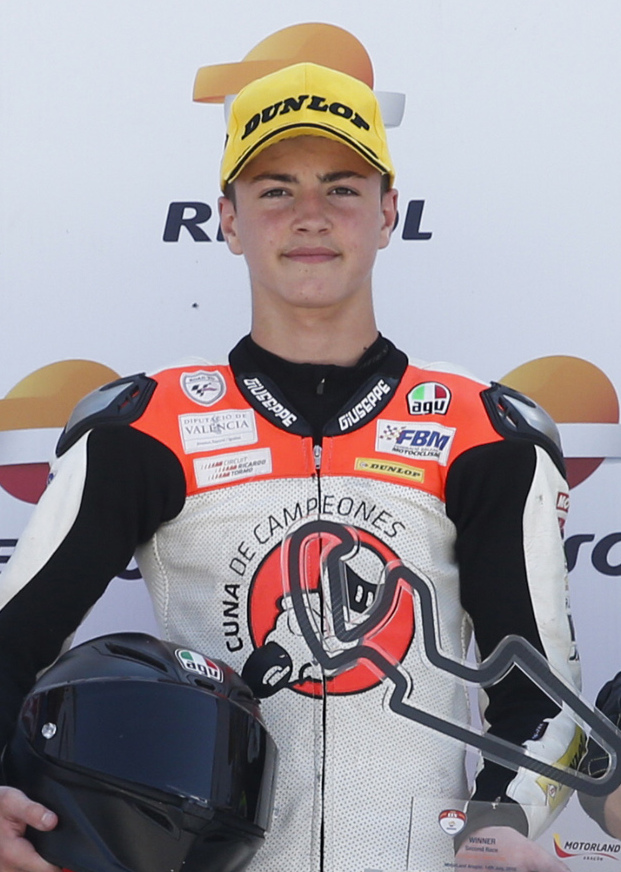
- Guevara in 2019
- Nationality: Spanish
- Born: 28 June 2004 (age 22); Palma de Mallorca, Spain
- Current team: Blu Cru Pramac Yamaha Moto2 Team
- Bike number: 28
Motorcycle racing career statistics
Moto2 World Championship
Active years	2023–
Manufacturers	Kalex (2023–2024), Boscoscuro (2025– )
2025 championship position	11th (134 pts)
Starts / Wins / Podiums / Poles / F. laps / Points; 79 / 5 / 12 / 5 / 1 / 496
Moto3 World Championship
Active years	2021–2022
Manufacturers	GasGas
Championships	1 (2022)
2022 championship position	1st (319 pts)
Starts / Wins / Podiums / Poles / F. laps / Points; 38 / 8 / 13 / 5 / 6 / 444

Izan Guevara Bonnin (born 28 June 2004) is a Spanish Grand Prix motorcycle racer who competes for the Blu Cru Pramac Yamaha Moto2 Team in the 2025 Moto2 World Championship.

Guevara is the 2022 Moto3 World Rider's Champion. Guevara is also the winner of the 2020 FIM CEV Moto3 Junior World Championship. Guevara is set to graduate to MotoGP in 2027 with the Prima Pramac Yamaha MotoGP team.

== Career ==
=== Early life ===
Guevara began riding motorcycles at the age of three. That same year, his parents enrolled him in a rider's school on the island of Mallorca. Growing up on the island, he often travelled to the Llucmajor Circuit to train. When he was six, Guevara was enrolled in the Balearic Federation school, and began to compete in Minimotos. In 2012, at the age of eight, Guevara joined the Cuna de Campeones motorcycle racing school and competed in the MiniGP 110 category.

=== Junior career ===
Guevara finished second in the 2018 CEV PreMoto3 Championship. In 2019, Guevara competed in the European Talent Cup for the Cuna de Campeones team, a motorcycle racing school based in Valencia, Spain. He took six consecutive race wins and four pole positions, winning the title with three races to spare after the round at Jerez. In 2020, Guevara was crowned champion of the FIM Moto3 Junior World Championship after the round in Valencia, his fifth victory of the year. He raced with the Openbank Aspar Team on a KTM motorcycle that year. That same year, Guevara was selected for the Red Bull MotoGP Rookies Cup, finishing ninth in the championship standings.

=== Moto3 World Championship ===
In 2021, Guevara made his Moto3 debut with the Gaviota GasGas Aspar Team. He began his first Moto3 race, the Qatar Grand Prix, in second qualifying position, completing the race in seventh. At the Austin Grand Prix, Guevara took his maiden win despite the race being red-flagged. He finished the season eighth in the overall championship standings.

In 2022, Guevara's second season with Aspar brought him his first World Championship after his sixth race win at the Australian Grand Prix. He won again at the Valencia Grand Prix, sweeping all four Spanish rounds that year.

=== Moto2 World Championship ===
==== Gaviota GasGas Aspar Team (2023-2024) ====
Guevara moved up to Moto2 in 2023, continuing with the Aspar Team. His highest result that season was sixth place. In 2024, Guevara's fourth season with Aspar, he managed to secure a podium finish: third place at the Malaysian Grand Prix. He completed the season with one podium and two top-ten finishes under his belt. He left Aspar after 2024, and joined the Blu Cru Pramac Yamaha Moto2 team for the 2025 Moto2 season.

==== Blu Cru Pramac Yamaha Moto2 (2025-2026) ====
In 2025, Guevara achieved his first Moto2 first-place finish at the Valencia Grand Prix, delivering the Pramac team's maiden Moto2 victory. He also finished the season with a second-place podium in Indonesia. Guevara continues to ride with the Blu Cru Pramac Yamaha Moto2 team for the 2026 season. At the Indonesian Grand Prix on October 9, 2026, Guevara set the all-time qualifying lap record at the track, the first time a Moto2 vehicle had dipped into the time bracket. He currently holds five race wins and four podiums in the 2026 season, remaining at second in the standings to his teammate Alberto Ferrández.

=== MotoGP World Championship ===
Guevara had the opportunity to ride the Yamaha YZR-M1 at Yamaha's private test at the Circuit Ricardo Tormo, held right after the Valencia test. At Sepang, Pramac team principal Gino Borsoi promised Guevara that he could ride the M1 if he secured his team's first Moto2 victory in the remaining rounds. Guevara fulfilled his bet by winning the final 2025 Moto2 race in Valencia. Yamaha officially granted Guevara the opportunity to ride this year's inline-engined YZR-M1 during a private test on Wednesday, where Yamaha's 2026 MotoGP riders continued development of the new V4.

==== Prima Pramac Yamaha MotoGP (2027–) ====
Guevara is set to graduate to MotoGP in 2027 with Prima Pramac Racing, where he will be partnered with Toprak Razgatlıoğlu.

== Career statistics ==
=== CEV PreMoto3 Championship ===
==== By season ====
Season	Class	Motorcycle	Race	Win	Podium	Pts	Plcd
2018	PreMoto3	MIR Racing	N/A	3	4	121	2nd

=== European Talent Cup ===
==== Races by year ====
(key) (Races in bold indicate pole position, races in italics indicate fastest lap)

Year	Bike	1	2	3	4	5	6	7	8	9	10	11	Pos	Pts
2019	Honda	EST; 10	EST; 8	VAL; 1	**VAL**; 1	**CAT**; 1	**ARA**; 1	ARA; 1	JER1; 1	**JER2**; 3	ALB; 10	VAL1	1st	186

=== FIM CEV Moto3 Junior World Championship ===
==== Races by year ====
(key) (Races in bold indicate pole position, races in italics indicate fastest lap)

Year	Bike	1	2	3	4	5	6	7	8	9	10	11	12	Pos	Pts
2019	KTM	EST	VAL1	VAL2	FRA	CAT1	CAT2	ARA	JER1	JER2	ALB	VAL1; 25	VAL2; 22	NC	0
2020	KTM	EST; 8	POR; 13	JER1; 8	JER2; 1	JER3; 2	ARA1; 1	ARA2; 1	ARA3; 1	VAL1; 1	VAL2; 3	VAL3; 3		1st	196

=== Red Bull MotoGP Rookies Cup ===
==== Races by year ====
(key) (Races in bold indicate pole position; races in italics indicate fastest lap)

Year	1	2	3	4	5	6	7	8	9	10	11	12	Pos	Pts
2020	RBR1	RBR1	RBR2; 18	RBR2; 11	ARA1; 9	ARA1; 4	ARA2; 10	ARA2; 5	VAL1; 10	VAL1; 5	VAL2; Ret	VAL2; 4	9th	72

=== Grand Prix motorcycle racing ===
==== By season ====
Season	Class	Motorcycle	Team	Race	Win	Podium	Pole	FLap	Pts	Plcd
2021	Moto3	GasGas	GasGas Aspar Team	18	1	1	0	4	125	8th
2022	Moto3	GasGas	GasGas Aspar Team	20	7	12	5	2	319	**1st**
2023	Moto2	Kalex	GasGas Aspar Team	18	0	0	0	0	20	22nd
2024	Moto2	Kalex	CFMoto Aspar Team	19	0	1	0	0	69	17th
2025	Moto2	Boscoscuro	Blu Cru Pramac Yamaha Moto2	22	1	2	0	0	134	11th
2026	Moto2	Boscoscuro	Blu Cru Pramac Yamaha Moto2	19	4	9	5	1	273*	**2nd***
Total				**117**	**13**	**25**	**10**	**7**	**940**	

==== By class ====
Class	Seasons	1st GP	1st pod	1st win	Race	Win	Podiums	Pole	FLap	Pts	WChmp
Moto3	2021–2022	2021 Qatar	2021 Americas	2021 Americas	38	8	13	5	6	444	1
Moto2	2023–present	2023 Americas	2024 Malaysia	2025 Valencia	79	5	12	5	1	496	0
Total	2021–present				**117**	**13**	**25**	**10**	**7**	**940**	**1**

==== Races by year ====
(key) (Races in bold indicate pole position; races in italics indicate fastest lap)

Year	Class	Bike	1	2	3	4	5	6	7	8	9	10	11	12	13	14	15	16	17	18	19	20	21	22	Pos	Pts
2021	Moto3	GasGas	QAT; 7	DOH; 6	POR; 24	SPA; 11	FRA; 14	ITA; 17	CAT; Ret	GER; 10	NED; 12	STY; 14	AUT; 8	GBR; 4	ARA; 4	RSM; 12	AME; 1	EMI; 12	ALR; 5	VAL; 7					8th	125
2022	Moto3	GasGas	**QAT**; 8	INA; 2	ARG; Ret	AME; 7	POR; 5	**SPA**; 1	FRA; 3	ITA; 2	CAT; 1	**GER**; 1	NED; 2	GBR; Ret	AUT; 7	RSM; 3	**ARA**; 1	JPN; 1	THA; 5	AUS; 1	MAL; 12	**VAL**; 1			1st	319
2023	Moto2	Kalex	POR	ARG	AME; 21	SPA; 22	FRA; 22	ITA; 18	GER; Ret	NED; Ret	GBR; 21	AUT; 13	CAT; 25	RSM; Ret	IND; 13	JPN; 14	INA; 21	AUS; 6^{‡}	THA; 9	MAL; Ret	QAT; 23	VAL; Ret			22nd	20
2024	Moto2	Kalex	QAT; Ret	POR; 22	AME; 20	SPA; 12	FRA; 10	CAT; Ret	ITA; 8	NED; 19	GER; 13	GBR; 20	AUT; 12	ARA; Ret	RSM; 21	EMI; 13	INA; DSQ	JPN; 10	AUS; 16	THA; 6	MAL; 3	SLD; 7			17th	69
2025	Moto2	Boscoscuro	THA; 16	ARG; 15	AME; 5	QAT; 22	SPA; Ret	FRA; Ret	GBR; 5	ARA; 11	ITA; 7	NED; Ret	GER; 8	CZE; 6	AUT; 9	HUN; Ret	CAT; 5	RSM; 10	JPN; Ret	INA; 2	AUS; 16	MAL; 12	POR; 10	VAL; 1	11th	134
2026	Moto2	Boscoscuro	THA; 2^{‡}	BRA; 6	USA; 3	SPA; 7	**FRA**; 1	CAT; 3	ITA; 7	**HUN**; 6	CZE; 6	NED; 4	GER; 3	**GBR**; 5	ARA; 2	RSM; 6	AUT; 1	**JPN**; 1	**INA**; 1	AUS; C	MAL; 4	QAT; Ret	POR	VAL	2nd*	273*

^{‡} Half points awarded as less than half of the race distance (but at least three full laps) was completed.
* Season still in progress.
