= 2022 Spanish motorcycle Grand Prix =

Motorcycle race in Jerez de la Frontera

(Spain) 2022 Spanish Grand Prix
Race details
- Race 6 of 20 races in the 2022 Grand Prix motorcycle racing season
- Date: 30 April – 1 May 2022
- Official name: Gran Premio Red Bull de España
- Location: Circuito de Jerez – Ángel Nieto; Jerez de la Frontera, Cádiz, Spain
- Course: Permanent racing facility; 4.423 km (2.748 mi)

MotoGP
Pole position
Rider	(Italy) Francesco Bagnaia	Ducati
Time	1:36.170	
Fastest lap
Rider	(Italy) Francesco Bagnaia	Ducati
Time	1:37.669 on lap 5	
Podium
First	(Italy) Francesco Bagnaia	Ducati
Second	(France) Fabio Quartararo	Yamaha
Third	(Spain) Aleix Espargaró	Aprilia

Moto2
Pole position
Rider	(Japan) Ai Ogura	Kalex
Time	1:41.289	
Fastest lap
Rider	(United Kingdom) Sam Lowes	Kalex
Time	1:41.757 on lap 3	
Podium
First	(Japan) Ai Ogura	Kalex
Second	(Spain) Arón Canet	Kalex
Third	(Italy) Tony Arbolino	Kalex

Moto3
Pole position
Rider	(Spain) Izan Guevara	Gas Gas
Time	1:45.880	
Fastest lap
Rider	(Spain) Izan Guevara	Gas Gas
Time	1:46.084 on lap 2	
Podium
First	(Spain) Izan Guevara	Gas Gas
Second	(Spain) Sergio García	Gas Gas
Third	(Spain) Jaume Masià	KTM

MotoE Race 1
Pole position
Rider	(Spain) Miquel Pons	Energica
Time	1:48.372	
Fastest lap
Rider	(Spain) Héctor Garzó	Energica
Time	1:48.120 on lap 2	
Podium
First	(Brazil) Eric Granado	Energica
Second	(Switzerland) Dominique Aegerter	Energica
Third	(Italy) Matteo Ferrari	Energica

MotoE Race 2
Pole position
Rider	(Spain) Miquel Pons	Energica
Time	1:48.372	
Fastest lap
Rider	(Brazil) Eric Granado	Energica
Time	1:48.185 on lap 2	
Podium
First	(Brazil) Eric Granado	Energica
Second	(Spain) Miquel Pons	Energica
Third	(Italy) Mattia Casadei	Energica

The 2022 Spanish motorcycle Grand Prix (officially known as the Gran Premio Red Bull de España) was the sixth round of the 2022 Grand Prix motorcycle racing season and the first round of the 2022 MotoE World Cup. All races (except MotoE race 1, which was held on 30 April) were held at the Circuito de Jerez – Ángel Nieto in Jerez de la Frontera on 1 May 2022.

== Background ==
=== Riders' entries ===
In the MotoGP class, the presence of two wildcards in the entry list of the race should be noted: Lorenzo Savadori, in his second consecutive race after the Portuguese Grand Prix, and Stefan Bradl, who had already replaced Marc Márquez in the Repsol Honda Team in the Grand Prix of Argentina. In the Moto2 class, Stefano Manzi replaces Keminth Kubo in the Yamaha VR46 Master Camp Team, following the diagnosis of costochondritis found on the Thai rider after FP1. In the Moto3 class, in addition to the presence of Gerard Riu to replace David Muñoz, David Salvador replaces for the third consecutive race John McPhee, stopped due to injury, and the Malaysian rider Syarifuddin Azman replaces Alberto Surra (also injured) as in the Grand Prix of Portugal. In the MotoE class, which debuts in this Grand Prix, Bradley Smith of the WithU GRT RNF MotoE Team, following the crash at the 24 Hours of Le Mans, he is forced to give up this stage and is replaced by Lukas Tulovic, while the Spanish rider Yeray Ruiz replaces the starting rider Xavi Cardelús in the Avintia Esponsorama Racing, absent due to injury.

=== MotoGP Championship standings before the race ===
Fabio Quartararo, winner of the Portuguese Grand Prix, and Álex Rins lead the riders' standings with 69 points, 3 more than Aleix Espargaró, 8 more than Enea Bastianini (previous leader) and 18 more than Johann Zarco. In the constructors' classification, Ducati is confirmed first with 106 points, followed by KTM and Suzuki, both at 70 points, Yamaha at 70 points, which overtakes Aprilia by 1 point and Honda at 44 points. The top five positions in the team standings are occupied by Team Suzuki Ecstar (115 points), Aprilia Racing (91 points), Monster Energy Yamaha MotoGP (86 points), Red Bull KTM Factory Racing (81 points) and Pramac Racing (79 points).

=== Moto2 Championship standings before the race ===
Celestino Vietti leads the riders' classification with 90 points with a wide margin on the first rivals, enclosed in 7 points: Ai Ogura (59 points), Tony Arbolino (54 points), Joe Roberts (winner in Portimão) and Arón Canet (49 points). The constructors' classification sees Kalex with 125 points, Boscoscuro with 20 points and MV Agusta with 5 points. In the team standings, Idemitsu Honda Team Asia is confirmed in the lead with 101 points, with an advantage of 11 points over Mooney VR46 Racing Team, 12 over Elf Marc VDS Racing Team, 13 over Flexbox HP40 and 51 over to Liqui Moly Intact GP.

=== Moto3 Championship standings before the race ===
Sergio García and Dennis Foggia continue to exchange at the helm of the riders' standings, with the Spaniard, winner of the previous race, who precedes the Italian by only one point (83 vs 82 points). Jaume Masià is third with 54 points, followed by Andrea Migno and Deniz Öncü 4 points behind. In the constructors' classification, Gas Gas and Honda are paired in first place with 99 points, followed by KTM with 82 points, Husqvarna with 56 points and CFMoto, who closes with 50 points. Aspar Team overtakes Leopard Racing at the top of the team standings (131 points for the first, 109 for the second); Red Bull KTM Ajo is third with 70 points, 2 more than CFMoto Racing Prüstel GP and 13 more than Red Bull KTM Tech3.

== Free practice ==
=== MotoGP ===
The first session sees the Suzuki bikes of Joan Mir and Álex Rins in front of everyone, with Álex Márquez third. In the second session, Fabio Quartararo precedes Enea Bastianini and Francesco Bagnaia. The latter was the fastest in the third session (and in the combined standings) ahead of Quartararo and Takaaki Nakagami.

==== Combined Free Practice 1-2-3 ====
The top ten riders (written in bold) qualified in Q2.

Fastest session lap

Pos.	No.	Biker	Constructor	Free practice times		
Pos.	No.	Biker	Constructor	FP1	FP2	FP3
1	63	**(Italy) Francesco Bagnaia**	**Ducati**	1:38.898	1:37.283	**1:36.782**
2	20	**(France) Fabio Quartararo**	**Yamaha**	1:38.439	1:37.071	**1:36.849**
3	30	**(Japan) Takaaki Nakagami**	**Honda**	1:38.458	1:37.581	**1:36.899**
4	93	**(Spain) Marc Márquez**	**Honda**	1:38.806	1:38.200	**1:36.925**
5	12	**(Spain) Maverick Viñales**	**Aprilia**	1:38.627	1:37.759	**1:36.975**
6	23	**(Italy) Enea Bastianini**	**Ducati**	1:38.866	1:37.272	**1:36.976**
7	41	**(Spain) Aleix Espargaró**	**Aprilia**	1:38.426	1:37.848	**1:37.059**
8	36	**(Spain) Joan Mir**	**Suzuki**	1:38.194	1:37.842	**1:37.060**
9	89	**(Spain) Jorge Martín**	**Ducati**	1:38.907	1:37.368	**1:37.074**
10	43	**(Australia) Jack Miller**	**Ducati**	1:38.754	1:37.762	**1:37.124**
11	72	(Italy) Marco Bezzecchi	Ducati	1:39.122	1:38.196	**1:37.201**
12	5	(France) Johann Zarco	Ducati	1:39.033	1:37.830	**1:37.230**
13	42	(Spain) Álex Rins	Suzuki	1:38.219	1:37.726	**1:37.293**
14	33	(South Africa) Brad Binder	KTM	1:38.502	1:37.585	**1:37.314**
15	21	(Italy) Franco Morbidelli	Yamaha	1:38.979	1:37.952	**1:37.315**
16	88	(Portugal) Miguel Oliveira	KTM	1:38.991	1:38.102	**1:37.494**
17	44	(Spain) Pol Espargaró	Honda	1:38.521	**1:37.590**	1:37.630
18	10	(Italy) Luca Marini	Ducati	1:39.749	1:38.102	**1:37.642**
19	4	(Italy) Andrea Dovizioso	Yamaha	1:39.182	1:38.285	**1:37.731**
20	49	(Italy) Fabio Di Giannantonio	Ducati	1:40.065	1:38.313	**1:37.880**
21	6	(Germany) Stefan Bradl	Honda	1:39.322	1:38.322	**1:38.013**
22	73	(Spain) Álex Márquez	Honda	1:38.368	**1:38.027**	1:38.237
23	87	(Australia) Remy Gardner	KTM	1:39.700	1:38.353	**1:38.095**
24	32	(Italy) Lorenzo Savadori	Aprilia	1:40.035	1:38.960	**1.38.207**
25	40	(South Africa) Darryn Binder	Yamaha	1:41.352	1:38.888	**1:38.238**
OFFICIAL MOTOGP COMBINED FREE PRACTICE TIMES REPORT

==== Free practice 4 ====
In the fourth session, Francesco Bagnaia was the fastest ahead of Fabio Quartararo and Joan Mir.

=== Moto2 ===
Jake Dixon dominated free practice by setting the best time in all three sessions: in the first he preceded Sam Lowes and Augusto Fernández; in the second the English finished ahead of Fernández and Ai Ogura; in the third he put Lowes and Barry Baltus behind him.

==== Combined Free Practice 1-2-3 ====
The top fourteen riders (written in bold) qualified in Q2.

Fastest session lap

Pos.	No.	Biker	Constructor	Free practice times		
Pos.	No.	Biker	Constructor	FP1	FP2	FP3
1	96	**(United Kingdom) Jake Dixon**	**Kalex**	1:41.938	1:41.646	**1:41.556**
2	22	**(United Kingdom) Sam Lowes**	**Kalex**	1:42.213	1:42.072	**1:41.568**
3	7	**(Belgium) Barry Baltus**	**Kalex**	1:43.436	1:43.119	**1:41.598**
4	23	**(Germany)** **Marcel Schrötter**	**Kalex**	1:42.709	1:42.585	**1:41.671**
5	51	**(Spain) Pedro Acosta**	**Kalex**	1:42.366	1:42.181	**1:41.673**
6	16	**(United States) Joe Roberts**	**Kalex**	1:43.213	1:42.181	**1:41.679**
7	54	**(Spain) Fermín Aldeguer**	**Boscoscuro**	1:42.531	1:42.295	**1:41.767**
8	79	**(Japan) Ai Ogura**	**Kalex**	1:42.273	1:42.009	**1:41.769**
9	2	**(Argentina) Gabriel Rodrigo**	**Kalex**	1:43.333	1:42.744	**1:41.793**
10	13	**(Italy) Celestino Vietti**	**Kalex**	1:42.522	1:42.752	**1:41.828**
11	14	(Italy) **Tony Arbolino**	**Kalex**	1:42.535	1:42.073	**1:41.857**
12	37	(Spain) **Augusto Fernández**	**Kalex**	1:42.245	1:41.898	**1:41.869**
13	40	(Spain) **Arón Canet**	**Kalex**	1:42.945	1:42.229	**1:41.912**
14	19	(Italy) **Lorenzo Dalla Porta**	**Kalex**	1:43.883	1:42.773	**1:41.923**
15	75	(Spain) Albert Arenas	Kalex	1:42.286	1:42.161	**1:42.053**
16	9	(Spain) Jorge Navarro	Kalex	1:43.065	1:42.615	**1:42.059**
17	35	(Japan) Somkiat Chantra	Honda	1:42.609	1:42.263	**1:42.062**
18	52	(Spain) Jeremy Alcoba	Kalex	1:42.855	1:42.919	**1:42.079**
19	61	(Italy) Alessandro Zaccone	Kalex	1:43.080	1:42.834	**1:42.124**
20	20	(Netherlands) Bo Bendsneyder	Kalex	1:42.969	1:42.314	**1:42.172**
21	6	(United States) Cameron Beaubier	Kalex	1:42.292	**1:42.278**	1:42.539
22	18	(Spain) Manuel González	Kalex	1:43.238	1:42.545	**1:42.319**
23	42	(Spain) Marcos Rámirez	MV Agusta	1:42.690	1:42.784	**1:42.342**
24	84	(Netherlands) Zonta van den Goorbergh	Kalex	1:44.638	1:43.103	**1.42.474**
25	12	(Czech Republic) Filip Salač	Kalex	**1:42.593**	1:44.187	1:42.935
26	5	(Italy) Romano Fenati	Boscoscuro	1:43.297	1:42.692	**1:42.605**
27	24	(Italy) Simone Corsi	MV Agusta	1:44.113	1:43.209	**1:42.883**
28	62	(Italy) Stefano Manzi	Kalex			**1:43.086**
29	4	(United States) Sean Dylan Kelly	Kalex	1:44.076	1:43.697	**1:43.177**
30	28	(Italy) Niccolò Antonelli	Kalex	1:44.248	1:43.937	**1:43.228**
OFFICIAL MOTO2 COMBINED FREE PRACTICE TIMES REPORT

==== Note ====
- Keminth Kubo played the first session (1:44.403) but was forced to give up the Grand Prix following the diagnosis of costochondritis. The Yamaha VR46 Master Camp Team replaced him with Stefano Manzi.

=== Moto3 ===
In the first session, Deniz Öncü was the fastest, followed by Ayumu Sasaki and Sergio García. In the second session, Izan Guevara finished in the lead, ahead of Sasaki and Jaume Masià. In the third session, Diogo Moreira set the best time ahead of Guevara and David Salvador.

==== Combined Free Practice 1-2-3 ====
The top fourteen riders (written in bold) qualified in Q2.

Fastest session lap

Pos.	No.	Biker	Constructor	Free practice times		
Pos.	No.	Biker	Constructor	FP1	FP2	FP3
1	10	**(Brazil) Diogo Moreira**	**KTM**	1:49.453	1:47.100	1:45.736
2	28	**(Spain) Izan Guevara**	**Gas Gas**	1:48.652	1:46.341	1:45.738
3	38	**(Spain) David Salvador**	**Husqvarna**	1:50.283	1:46.879	1:45.915
4	7	**(Italy)** **Dennis Foggia**	**Honda**	1:48.717	1:47.229	1:45.983
5	53	**(Turkey) Deniz Öncü**	**KTM**	1:47.888	1:46.738	1:46.024
6	16	**(Italy) Andrea Migno**	**Honda**	1:49.686	1:47.103	1:46.088
7	5	**(Spain) Jaume Masià**	**KTM**	1:49.103	1:46.533	1:46.145
8	6	**(Japan) Ryusei Yamanaka**	**KTM**	1:49.744	1:47.523	1:46.185
9	11	**(Spain) Sergio García**	**Gas Gas**	1:48.447	1:47.115	1:46.214
10	99	**(Spain) Carlos Tatay**	**CFMoto**	1:48.502	1:46.667	1:46.257
11	48	(Spain) **Iván Ortolá**	**KTM**	1:50.744	1:46.984	1:46.309
12	71	(Japan) **Ayumu Sasaki**	**Husqvarna**	1:48.207	1:46.473	1:46.337
13	66	(Australia) **Joel Kelso**	**KTM**	1:49.680	1:47.905	1:46.346
14	54	(Italy) **Riccardo Rossi**	**Honda**	1:49.967	1:47.146	1.46.435
15	27	(Japan) Kaito Toba	KTM	1:49.158	1:48.051	1:46.554
16	19	(United Kingdom) Scott Ogden	Honda	1:49.872	1:46.902	1:46.733
17	43	(Spain) Xavier Artigas	CFMoto	1:50.319	1:47.760	1:46.854
18	24	(Japan) Tatsuki Suzuki	Honda	1:49.296	1:47.339	1:46.886
19	96	(Spain) Daniel Holgado	KTM	1:50.805	1:47.702	1:47.018
20	82	(Italy) Stefano Nepa	KTM	1:49.814	1:47.973	1:47.289
21	63	(Malaysia) Syarifuddin Azman	Honda	1:50.553	1:48.592	1:47.363
22	18	(Italy) Matteo Bertelle	KTM	1:51.526	1:47.805	1:47.389
23	64	(Indonesia) Mario Aji	Honda	1:50.707	1:47.499	1:47.432
24	23	(Italy) Elia Bartolini	KTM	1:50.984	1:48.783	1.47.525
25	31	(Spain) Adrián Fernández	KTM	1:50.712	1:48.815	1:47.593
26	87	(Spain) Gerard Riu	KTM	1:49.168	1:48.082	1:47.755
27	72	(Japan) Taiyo Furusato	Honda	1:51.047	1:48.179	1:47.985
28	22	(Spain) Ana Carrasco	KTM	1:50.789	1:49.564	1:48.973
OFFICIAL MOTO3 COMBINED FREE PRACTICE TIMES REPORT

==== Notes ====
- Joshua Whatley played the first session (1: 52.982), but was forced to leave the Grand Prix due to a crash.
- Lorenzo Fellon played the first session (1:50.277) and the second session (1:47.590), but was forced to leave the Grand Prix due to a dislocated right shoulder.

=== MotoE ===
==== Combined Free Practice 1 and 2 ====
The top eight riders (written in bold) qualified in Q2.

Fastest session lap

Pos.	No.	Biker	Constructor	Free practice times	
Pos.	No.	Biker	Constructor	FP1	FP2
1	41	**(Brazil) Eric Granado**	**Energica**	2:01.991	1:48.861
2	4	**(Spain) Héctor Garzó**	**Energica**	1:55.390	1:48.972
3	11	**(Italy) Matteo Ferrari**	**Energica**	No time	1:49.073
4	27	**(Italy)** **Mattia Casadei**	**Energica**	1:52.682	1:49.089
5	40	**(Spain) Jordi Torres**	**Energica**	1:56.028	1:49.188
6	71	**(Spain) Miquel Pons**	**Energica**	1:52.659	1:49.202
7	78	**(Japan) Hikari Okubo**	**Energica**	1:54.937	1:49.302
8	77	**(Switzerland) Dominique Aegerter**	**Energica**	1:53.613	1:49.560
9	17	**(Spain)** Álex Escrig	Energica	1:54.352	1:49.613
10	21	**(Italy)** Kevin Zannoni	Energica	1:53.779	1:49.641
11	7	(Italy) Niccolò Canepa	Energica	1:53.318	1:49.826
12	70	(Spain) Marc Alcoba	Energica	1:55.342	1:49.859
13	12	(Spain) Xavi Forés	Energica	1:54.347	1:50.049
14	6	(Spain) María Herrera	Energica	1:55.153	1.50.140
15	34	(Italy) Kevin Manfredi	Energica	1:53.431	1:50.218
16	3	(Germany) Lukas Tulovic	Energica	1:53.024	1:50.218
17	72	(Italy) Alessio Finello	Energica	1:53.929	1:50.550
18	28	(Spain) Yeray Ruiz	Energica	1:56.900	1:51.478
OFFICIAL MOTOE COMBINED FREE PRACTICE TIMES REPORT

== Qualifying ==
=== MotoGP ===
Fastest session lap

Pos.	No.	Biker	Constructor	Qualifying times		Final grid	Row
Pos.	No.	Biker	Constructor	Q1	Q2	Final grid	Row
1	63	(Italy) Francesco Bagnaia	Ducati	Qualified in Q2	1:36.170	1	1
2	20	(France) Fabio Quartararo	Yamaha	Qualified in Q2	1:36.623	2	1
3	41	(Spain) Aleix Espargaró	Aprilia	Qualified in Q2	1:36.933	3	1
4	43	(Australia) Jack Miller	Ducati	Qualified in Q2	1:37.049	4	2
5	93	(Spain) Marc Márquez	Honda	Qualified in Q2	1:37.145	5	2
6	5	(France) Johann Zarco	Ducati	1:37.003	1:37.220	6	2
7	30	(Japan) Takaaki Nakagami	Honda	Qualified in Q2	1:37.254	7	3
8	72	(Italy) Marco Bezzecchi	Ducati	1:37.135	1:37.285	8	3
9	36	(Spain) Joan Mir	Suzuki	Qualified in Q2	1:37.330	9	3
10	89	(Spain) Jorge Martín	Ducati	Qualified in Q2	1:37.526	10	4
11	23	(Italy) Enea Bastianini	Ducati	Qualified in Q2	1:37.618	11	4
12	12	(Spain) Maverick Viñales	Aprilia	Qualified in Q2	1:37.675	12	4
13	44	(Spain) Pol Espargaró	Honda	1:37.138	N/A	13	5
14	42	(Spain) Álex Rins	Suzuki	1:37.401	N/A	14	5
15	33	(South Africa) Brad Binder	KTM	1:37.544	N/A	15	5
16	21	(Italy) Franco Morbidelli	Yamaha	1:37.688	N/A	16	6
17	49	(Italy) Fabio Di Giannantonio	Ducati	1:37.882	N/A	17	6
18	87	(Australia) Remy Gardner	KTM	1:37.889	N/A	18	6
19	10	(Italy) Luca Marini	Ducati	1:37.910	N/A	19	7
20	6	(Germany) Stefan Bradl	Honda	1:37.937	N/A	20	7
21	88	(Portugal) Miguel Oliveira	KTM	1:37.958	N/A	21	7
22	73	(Spain) Álex Márquez	Honda	1:38.014	N/A	22	8
23	4	(Italy) Andrea Dovizioso	Yamaha	1:38.064	N/A	23	8
24	32	(Italy) Lorenzo Savadori	Aprilia	1:38.244	N/A	24	8
25	40	(South Africa) Darryn Binder	Yamaha	1:38.405	N/A	25	9
OFFICIAL MOTOGP QUALIFYING RESULTS

=== Moto2 ===
Fastest session lap

Pos.	No.	Biker	Constructor	Qualifying times		Final grid	Row
Pos.	No.	Biker	Constructor	Q1	Q2	Final grid	Row
1	79	(Japan) Ai Ogura	Kalex	Qualified in Q2	1:41.289	1	1
2	14	(Italy) Tony Arbolino	Kalex	Qualified in Q2	1:41.299	2	1
3	22	(United Kingdom) Sam Lowes	Kalex	Qualified in Q2	1:41.321	3	1
4	40	(Spain) Arón Canet	Kalex	Qualified in Q2	1:41.369	4	2
5	54	(Spain) Fermín Aldeguer	Boscoscuro	Qualified in Q2	1:41.620	5	2
6	13	(Italy) Celestino Vietti	Kalex	Qualified in Q2	1:41.741	6	2
7	35	(Thailand) Somkiat Chantra	Kalex	1:41.397	1:41.753	7	3
8	64	(Netherlands) Bo Bendsneyder	Kalex	1:41.890	1:41.815	8	3
9	37	(Spain) Augusto Fernández	Kalex	Qualified in Q2	1:41.901	9	3
10	51	(Spain) Pedro Acosta	Kalex	Qualified in Q2	1:41.914	10	4
11	96	(United Kingdom) Jake Dixon	Kalex	Qualified in Q2	1:41.966	11	4
12	75	(Spain) Albert Arenas	Kalex	1:41.809	1:42.072	12	4
13	9	(Spain) Jorge Navarro	Kalex	1:41.715	1:42.097	13	5
14	16	(United States) Joe Roberts	Kalex	Qualified in Q2	1:42.100	14	5
15	2	(Argentina) Gabriel Rodrigo	Kalex	Qualified in Q2	1:42.367	15	5
16	19	(Italy) Lorenzo Dalla Porta	Kalex	Qualified in Q2	1:42.381	16	6
17	7	(Belgium) Barry Baltus	Kalex	Qualified in Q2	1:42.631	17	6
18	23	(Germany) Marcel Schrötter	Kalex	Qualified in Q2	1:42.818	18	6
19	42	(Spain) Marcos Ramírez	MV Agusta	1:41.907	N/A	19	7
20	18	(Spain) Manuel González	Kalex	1:41.950	N/A	20	7
21	61	(Italy) Alessandro Zaccone	Kalex	1:42.051	N/A	21	7
22	12	(Czech Republic) Filip Salač	Kalex	1:42.063	N/A	22	8
23	52	(Spain) Jeremy Alcoba	Kalex	1:42.090	N/A	23	8
24	84	(Netherlands) Zonta van den Goorbergh	Kalex	1:42.287	N/A	24	8
25	6	(United States) Cameron Beaubier	Kalex	1:42.295	N/A	25	9
26	62	(Italy) Stefano Manzi	Kalex	1:42.634	N/A	26	9
27	5	(Italy) Romano Fenati	Boscoscuro	1:42.694	N/A	27	9
28	24	(Italy) Simone Corsi	MV Agusta	1:42.828	N/A	28	10
29	4	(United States) Sean Dylan Kelly	Kalex	1:43.211	N/A	29	10
30	28	(Italy) Niccolò Antonelli	Kalex	1:43.229	N/A	30	10
OFFICIAL MOTO2 QUALIFYING RESULTS

=== Moto3 ===
Fastest session lap

Pos.	No.	Biker	Constructor	Qualifying times		Final grid	Row
Pos.	No.	Biker	Constructor	Q1	Q2	Final grid	Row
1	28	(Spain) Izan Guevara	Gas Gas	Qualified in Q2	1:45.880	1	1
2	11	(Spain) Sergio García	Gas Gas	Qualified in Q2	1:46.004	2	1
3	5	(Spain) Jaume Masià	KTM	Qualified in Q2	1:46.051	3	1
4	7	(Italy) Dennis Foggia	Honda	Qualified in Q2	1:46.170	4	2
5	53	(Turkey) Deniz Öncü	KTM	Qualified in Q2	1:46.214	5	2
6	43	(Spain) Xavier Artigas	CFMoto	1:47.202	1:46.225	6	2
7	71	(Japan) Ayumu Sasaki	Husqvarna	Qualified in Q2	1:46.312	7	3
8	54	(Italy) Riccardo Rossi	Honda	Qualified in Q2	1:46.315	8	3
9	10	(Brazil) Diogo Moreira	KTM	Qualified in Q2	1:46.384	9	3
10	99	(Spain) Carlos Tatay	CFMoto	Qualified in Q2	1:46.395	10	4
11	19	(United Kingdom) Scott Ogden	Honda	1:46.922	1:46.454	11	4
12	6	(Japan) Ryusei Yamanaka	KTM	Qualified in Q2	1:46.483	12	4
13	16	(Italy) Andrea Migno	Honda	Qualified in Q2	1:46.815	13	5
14	66	(Australia) Joel Kelso	KTM	Qualified in Q2	1:46.918	14	5
15	48	(Spain) Iván Ortolá	KTM	Qualified in Q2	1:47.165	15	5
16	38	(Spain) David Salvador	Husqvarna	Qualified in Q2	1:47.242	16	6
17	18	(Italy) Matteo Bertelle	KTM	1:47.103	1:48.204	17	6
18	27	(Japan) Kaito Toba	KTM	1:46.858	No time	18	6
19	96	(Spain) Daniel Holgado	KTM	1:47.486	N/A	19	7
20	24	(Japan) Tatsuki Suzuki	Honda	1:47.489	N/A	20	7
21	31	(Spain) Adrián Fernández	KTM	1:47.502	N/A	21	7
22	87	(Spain) Gerard Riu	KTM	1:47.625	N/A	22	8
23	23	(Italy) Elia Bartolini	KTM	1:47.778	N/A	23	8
24	72	(Japan) Taiyo Furusato	Honda	1:47.819	N/A	24	8
25	62	(Malaysia) Syarifuddin Azman	Honda	1:48.075	N/A	25	9
26	82	(Italy) Stefano Nepa	KTM	1:48.303	N/A	26	9
27	64	(Indonesia) Mario Aji	Honda	1:48.341	N/A	27	9
28	22	(Spain) Ana Carrasco	KTM	1:49.241	N/A	28	10
OFFICIAL MOTO3 QUALIFYING RESULTS

=== MotoE ===
Fastest session lap

Pos.	No.	Biker	Constructor	Qualifying times		Final grid	Row
Pos.	No.	Biker	Constructor	Q1	Q2	Final grid	Row
1	71	(Spain) Miquel Pons	Energica	Qualified in Q2	1:48.372	1	1
2	4	(Spain) Héctor Garzó	Energica	Qualified in Q2	1:48.435	2	1
3	27	(Italy) Mattia Casadei	Energica	Qualified in Q2	1:48.609	3	1
4	51	(Brazil) Eric Granado	Energica	Qualified in Q2	1:48.693	4	2
5	77	(Switzerland) Dominique Aegerter	Energica	Qualified in Q2	1:48.763	5	2
6	11	(Italy) Matteo Ferrari	Energica	Qualified in Q2	1:48.783	6	2
7	40	(Spain) Jordi Torres	Energica	Qualified in Q2	1:48.926	7	3
8	78	(Japan) Hikari Okubo	Energica	Qualified in Q2	1:49.001	8	3
9	17	(Spain) Álex Escrig	Energica	1:49.204	1:49.413	9	3
10	7	(Italy) Niccolò Canepa	Energica	1:49.119	1:49.709	10	4
11	3	(Germany) Lukas Tulovic	Energica	1:49.280	N/A	11	4
12	21	(Italy) Kevin Zannoni	Energica	1:49.286	N/A	12	4
13	6	(Spain) María Herrera	Energica	1:49.406	N/A	13	5
14	34	(Italy) Kevin Manfredi	Energica	1:49.665	N/A	14	5
15	70	(Spain) Marc Alcoba	Energica	1:49.665	N/A	15	5
16	28	(Spain) Yeray Ruiz	Energica	1:50.112	N/A	16	6
17	72	(Italy) Alessio Finello	Energica	1:50.153	N/A	17	6
18	12	(Spain) Xavi Forés	Energica	1:50.351	N/A	18	6
OFFICIAL MOTOE QUALIFYING RESULTS

== Race ==
=== MotoGP ===
Pos.	No.	Biker	Team	Constructor	Laps	Time/Retired	Grid	Points
1	63	(Italy) Francesco Bagnaia	Ducati Lenovo Team	Ducati	25	41:00.554	1	25
2	20	(France) Fabio Quartararo	Monster Energy Yamaha MotoGP	Yamaha	25	+0.285	2	20
3	41	(Spain) Aleix Espargaró	Aprilia Racing	Aprilia	25	+10.977	3	16
4	93	(Spain) Marc Márquez	Repsol Honda Team	Honda	25	+12.676	5	13
5	43	(Australia) Jack Miller	Ducati Lenovo Team	Ducati	25	+12.957	4	11
6	36	(Spain) Joan Mir	Team Suzuki Ecstar	Suzuki	25	+13.934	9	10
7	30	(Japan) Takaaki Nakagami	LCR Honda Idemitsu	Honda	25	+14.929	7	9
8	23	(Italy) Enea Bastianini	Gresini Racing MotoGP	Ducati	25	+18.436	11	8
9	72	(Italy) Marco Bezzecchi	Mooney VR46 Racing Team	Ducati	25	+18.830	8	7
10	33	(South Africa) Brad Binder	Red Bull KTM Factory Racing	KTM	25	+20.056	15	6
11	44	(Spain) Pol Espargaró	Repsol Honda Team	Honda	25	+20.856	13	5
12	88	(Portugal) Miguel Oliveira	Red Bull KTM Factory Racing	KTM	25	+23.131	21	4
13	73	(Spain) Álex Márquez	LCR Honda Castrol	Honda	25	+25.306	22	3
14	12	(Spain) Maverick Viñales	Aprilia Racing	Aprilia	25	+27.358	12	2
15	21	(Italy) Franco Morbidelli	Monster Energy Yamaha MotoGP	Yamaha	25	+27.519	16	1
16	10	(Italy) Luca Marini	Mooney VR46 Racing Team	Ducati	25	+29.278	19	
17	4	(Italy) Andrea Dovizioso	WithU Yamaha RNF MotoGP Team	Yamaha	25	+35.204	23	
18	49	(Italy) Fabio Di Giannantonio	Gresini Racing MotoGP	Ducati	25	+35.361	17	
19	42	(Spain) Álex Rins	Team Suzuki Ecstar	Suzuki	25	+38.922	14	
20	87	(Australia) Remy Gardner	Tech3 KTM Factory Racing	KTM	25	+43.378	18	
21	32	(Italy) Lorenzo Savadori	Aprilia Racing	Aprilia	25	+44.299	24	
22	89	(Spain) Jorge Martín	Pramac Racing	Ducati	25	+1:07.681	10	
Ret	6	(Germany) Stefan Bradl	Team HRC	Honda	10	Accident	20	
Ret	5	(France) Johann Zarco	Pramac Racing	Ducati	9	Accident	6	
Ret	40	(South Africa) Darryn Binder	WithU Yamaha RNF MotoGP Team	Yamaha	5	Accident	25	
WD	25	(Spain) Raúl Fernández	Tech3 KTM Factory Racing	KTM		Withdrew		
Fastest lap: (Italy) Francesco Bagnaia (Ducati) – 1:37.669 (lap 5)
OFFICIAL MOTOGP RACE REPORT

=== Moto2 ===
Pos.	No.	Biker	Constructor	Laps	Time/Retired	Grid	Points
1	79	(Japan) Ai Ogura	Kalex	23	39:16.357	1	25
2	40	(Spain) Arón Canet	Kalex	23	+2.509	4	20
3	14	(Italy) Tony Arbolino	Kalex	23	+3.669	2	16
4	37	(Spain) Augusto Fernández	Kalex	23	+5.358	9	13
5	23	(Germany) Marcel Schrötter	Kalex	23	+9.245	18	11
6	13	(Italy) Celestino Vietti	Kalex	23	+12.122	6	10
7	64	(Netherlands) Bo Bendsneyder	Kalex	23	+13.918	8	9
8	16	(United States) Joe Roberts	Kalex	23	+14.064	14	8
9	75	(Spain) Albert Arenas	Kalex	23	+18.980	12	7
10	9	(Spain) Jorge Navarro	Kalex	23	+27.767	13	6
11	61	(Italy) Alessandro Zaccone	Kalex	23	+31.536	21	5
12	52	(Spain) Jeremy Alcoba	Kalex	23	+33.308	23	4
13	62	(Italy) Stefano Manzi	Kalex	23	+33.635	26	3
14	7	(Belgium) Barry Baltus	Kalex	23	+33.751	17	2
15	19	(Italy) Lorenzo Dalla Porta	Kalex	23	+33.836	16	1
16	18	(Spain) Manuel González	Kalex	23	+34.040	20	
17	2	(Argentina) Gabriel Rodrigo	Kalex	23	+37.292	15	
18	24	(Italy) Simone Corsi	MV Agusta	23	+41.128	28	
19	84	(Netherlands) Zonta van den Goorbergh	Kalex	23	+41.307	24	
20	51	(Spain) Pedro Acosta	Kalex	23	+46.441	10	
21	12	(Czech Republic) Filip Salač	Kalex	23	+53.073	22	
22	4	(United States) Sean Dylan Kelly	Kalex	23	+56.157	29	
23	28	(Italy) Niccolò Antonelli	Kalex	23	+56.521	30	
Ret	54	(Spain) Fermín Aldeguer	Boscoscuro	13	Accident Damage	5	
Ret	42	(Spain) Marcos Ramírez	MV Agusta	9	Accident	19	
Ret	96	(United Kingdom) Jake Dixon	Kalex	8	Accident	11	
Ret	35	(Thailand) Somkiat Chantra	Kalex	7	Accident Damage	7	
Ret	6	(United States) Cameron Beaubier	Kalex	7	Gear Shifter	25	
Ret	22	(United Kingdom) Sam Lowes	Kalex	6	Accident	3	
Ret	5	(Italy) Romano Fenati	Boscoscuro	4	Accident	27	
WD	81	(Thailand) Keminth Kubo	Kalex		Withdrew		
Fastest lap: (United Kingdom) Sam Lowes (Kalex) – 1:41.757 (lap 3)
OFFICIAL MOTO2 RACE REPORT

=== Moto3 ===
Pos.	No.	Biker	Constructor	Laps	Time/Retired	Grid	Points
1	28	(Spain) Izan Guevara	Gas Gas	22	39:19.873	1	25
2	11	(Spain) Sergio García	Gas Gas	22	+0.061	2	20
3	5	(Spain) Jaume Masià	KTM	22	+0.208	3	16
4	53	(Turkey) Deniz Öncü	KTM	22	+0.319	5	13
5	43	(Spain) Xavier Artigas	CFMoto	22	+0.410	6	11
6	71	(Japan) Ayumu Sasaki	Husqvarna	22	+0.847	7	10
7	27	(Japan) Kaito Toba	KTM	22	+3.787	18	9
8	6	(Japan) Ryusei Yamanaka	KTM	22	+3.982	12	8
9	96	(Spain) Daniel Holgado	KTM	22	+5.811	19	7
10	10	(Brazil) Diogo Moreira	KTM	22	+6.088	9	6
11	18	(Italy) Matteo Bertelle	KTM	22	+11.069	17	5
12	19	(United Kingdom) Scott Ogden	Honda	22	+11.142	11	4
13	48	(Spain) Iván Ortolá	KTM	22	+15.546	15	3
14	16	(Italy) Andrea Migno	Honda	22	+15.662	13	2
15	82	(Italy) Stefano Nepa	KTM	22	+15.687	26	1
16	23	(Italy) Elia Bartolini	KTM	22	+15.728	23	
17	64	(Indonesia) Mario Aji	Honda	22	+16.582	27	
18	7	(Italy) Dennis Foggia	Honda	22	+17.529	4	
19	38	(Spain) David Salvador	Husqvarna	22	+23.338	16	
20	87	(Spain) Gerard Riu	KTM	22	+25.408	22	
21	72	(Japan) Taiyo Furusato	Honda	22	+25.569	24	
22	63	(Malaysia) Syarifuddin Azman	Honda	22	+44.166	25	
23	22	(Spain) Ana Carrasco	KTM	22	+44.337	28	
Ret	54	(Italy) Riccardo Rossi	Honda	14	Accident	8	
Ret	24	(Japan) Tatsuki Suzuki	Honda	6	Accident	20	
Ret	31	(Spain) Adrián Fernández	KTM	5	Rider In Pain	21	
Ret	99	(Spain) Carlos Tatay	CFMoto	3	Accident	10	
Ret	66	(Australia) Joel Kelso	KTM	3	Handling	14	
Fastest lap: (Spain) Izan Guevara (Gas Gas) – 1:46.084 (lap 2)
OFFICIAL MOTO3 RACE REPORT

=== MotoE ===
==== Race 1 ====
Pos.	No.	Biker	Laps	Time/Retired	Grid	Points
1	51	(Brazil) Eric Granado	8	14:36.988	4	25
2	77	(Switzerland) Dominique Aegerter	8	+0.696	5	20
3	11	(Italy) Matteo Ferrari	8	+1.005	6	16
4	4	(Spain) Héctor Garzó	8	+1.537	2	13
5	40	(Spain) Jordi Torres	8	+1.697	7	11
6	78	(Japan) Hikari Okubo	8	+2.345	8	10
7	17	(Spain) Álex Escrig	8	+3.651	9	9
8	71	(Spain) Miquel Pons	8	+3.986	1	8
9	70	(Spain) Marc Alcoba	8	+5.275	15	7
10	3	(Germany) Lukas Tulovic	8	+5.334	11	6
11	7	(Italy) Niccolò Canepa	8	+5.814	10	5
12	21	(Italy) Kevin Zannoni	8	+6.511	12	4
13	34	(Italy) Kevin Manfredi	8	+9.621	14	3
14	12	(Spain) Xavi Forés	8	+10.849	18	2
15	6	(Spain) María Herrera	8	+12.094	13	1
16	16	(Spain) Yeray Ruiz	8	+22.491	16	
17	27	(Italy) Mattia Casadei	8	+1:32.262	3	
Ret	72	(Italy) Alessio Finello	7	Accident	17	
Fastest lap: (Spain) Héctor Garzó – 1:48.120 (lap 2)
OFFICIAL MOTOE RACE NR.1 REPORT

- All bikes manufactured by Energica.

==== Race 2 ====
Pos.	No.	Biker	Laps	Time/Retired	Grid	Points
1	51	(Brazil) Eric Granado	8	14:36.321	4	25
2	71	(Spain) Miquel Pons	8	+0.217	1	20
3	27	(Italy) Mattia Casadei	8	+0.394	3	16
4	77	(Switzerland) Dominique Aegerter	8	+0.488	5	13
5	78	(Japan) Hikari Okubo	8	+1.182	8	11
6	11	(Italy) Matteo Ferrari	8	+1.715	6	10
7	40	(Spain) Jordi Torres	8	+2.701	7	9
8	17	(Spain) Álex Escrig	8	+4.202	9	8
9	7	(Italy) Niccolò Canepa	8	+5.471	10	7
10	34	(Italy) Kevin Manfredi	8	+5.755	14	6
11	12	(Spain) Xavi Forés	8	+7.061	18	5
12	3	(Germany) Lukas Tulovic	8	+10.497	11	4
13	21	(Italy) Kevin Zannoni	8	+10.880	12	3
14	6	(Spain) María Herrera	8	+18.849	13	2
15	72	(Italy) Alessio Finello	8	+26.343	13	1
Ret	4	(Spain) Héctor Garzó	5	Accident	2	
Ret	28	(Spain) Yeray Ruiz	4	Accident	16	
Ret	70	(Spain) Marc Alcoba	0	Accident	15	
Fastest lap: (Brazil) Eric Granado – 1:48.185 (lap 2)
OFFICIAL MOTOE RACE NR.2 REPORT

- All bikes manufactured by Energica.

== Championship standings after the race ==
Below are the standings for the top five riders, constructors, and teams after the round.

=== MotoGP ===
Riders' Championship standings

	Pos.	Rider	Points
	1	(France) Fabio Quartararo	89
1	2	(Spain) Aleix Espargaró	82
1	3	(Italy) Enea Bastianini	69
2	4	(Spain) Álex Rins	69
5	5	(Italy) Francesco Bagnaia	56

Constructors' Championship standings

	Pos.	Constructor	Points
	1	(Italy) Ducati	131
2	2	(Japan) Yamaha	89
2	3	(Italy) Aprilia	83
1	4	(Japan) Suzuki	80
3	5	(Austria) KTM	76

Teams' Championship standings

	Pos.	Team	Points
	1	(Japan) Team Suzuki Ecstar	125
	2	(Italy) Aprilia Racing	109
	3	(Japan) Monster Energy Yamaha MotoGP	107
2	4	(Italy) Ducati Lenovo Team	98
1	5	(Austria) Red Bull KTM Factory Racing	91

=== Moto2 ===
Riders' Championship standings

	Pos.	Rider	Points
	1	(Italy) Celestino Vietti	100
	2	(Japan) Ai Ogura	81
	3	(Italy) Tony Arbolino	70
1	4	(Spain) Arón Canet	69
1	5	(United States) Joe Roberts	57

Constructors' Championship standings

Pos.	Constructor	Points
1	(Germany) Kalex	150
2	(Italy) Boscoscuro	20
3	(Italy) MV Agusta	5

Teams' Championship standings

	Pos.	Team	Points
	1	(Japan) Idemitsu Honda Team Asia	126
2	2	(Spain) Flexbox HP40	114
	3	(Belgium) Elf Marc VDS Racing Team	105
2	4	(Italy) Mooney VR46 Racing Team	100
	5	(Germany) Liqui Moly Intact GP	75

=== Moto3 ===
Riders' Championship standings

	Pos.	Rider	Points
	1	(Spain) Sergio García	103
	2	(Italy) Dennis Foggia	82
3	3	(Spain) Izan Guevara	73
1	4	(Spain) Jaume Masià	70
	5	(Turkey) Deniz Öncü	63

Constructors' Championship standings

Pos.	Constructor	Points
1	(Spain) Gas Gas	124
2	(Japan) Honda	103
3	(Austria) KTM	98
4	(Sweden) Husqvarna	66
5	(China) CFMoto	61

Teams' Championship standings

Pos.	Team	Points
1	(Spain) Gaviota GasGas Aspar Team	176
2	(Luxembourg) Leopard Racing	109
3	(Finland) Red Bull KTM Ajo	93
4	(Germany) CFMoto Racing Prüstel GP	79
5	(France) Red Bull KTM Tech3	70

=== MotoE ===
Pos.	Rider	Points
1	(Brazil) Eric Granado	50
2	(Switzerland) Dominique Aegerter	33
3	(Spain) Miquel Pons	28
4	(Italy) Matteo Ferrari	26
5	(Japan) Hikari Okubo	21

Previous race: 2022 Portuguese Grand Prix	FIM Grand Prix World Championship; 2022 season	Next race: 2022 French Grand Prix
Previous race: 2021 Spanish Grand Prix	Spanish motorcycle Grand Prix	Next race: 2023 Spanish Grand Prix
