= 2022 Motorcycle Grand Prix of the Americas =

Fourth round of the 2022 Grand Prix motorcycle racing season

(United States) 2022 Grand Prix of the Americas
Race details
- Race 4 of 20 races in the 2022 Grand Prix motorcycle racing season
- Date: April 10, 2022
- Official name: Red Bull Grand Prix of the Americas
- Location: Circuit of the Americas; Austin, Texas
- Course: Permanent racing facility; 5.513 km (3.426 mi)

MotoGP
Pole position
Rider	(Spain) Jorge Martín	Ducati
Time	2:02.039	
Fastest lap
Rider	(Italy) Enea Bastianini	Ducati
Time	2:03.521 on lap 14	
Podium
First	(Italy) Enea Bastianini	Ducati
Second	(Spain) Álex Rins	Suzuki
Third	(Australia) Jack Miller	Ducati

Moto2
Pole position
Rider	(United States) Cameron Beaubier	Kalex
Time	2:08.751	
Fastest lap
Rider	(Spain) Arón Canet	Kalex
Time	2:09.312 on lap 2	
Podium
First	(Italy) Tony Arbolino	Kalex
Second	(Japan) Ai Ogura	Kalex
Third	(United Kingdom) Jake Dixon	Kalex

Moto3
Pole position
Rider	(Italy) Andrea Migno	Honda
Time	2:15.814	
Fastest lap
Rider	(Spain) Jaume Masià	KTM
Time	2:16.179 on lap 7	
Podium
First	(Spain) Jaume Masià	KTM
Second	(Italy) Dennis Foggia	Honda
Third	(Italy) Andrea Migno	Honda

The 2022 Motorcycle Grand Prix of the Americas (officially known as the Red Bull Grand Prix of the Americas) was the fourth round of the 2022 Grand Prix motorcycle racing season. It was held at the Circuit of the Americas in Austin on April 10, 2022.

== Background ==
=== Riders' entries ===
In the MotoGP class, Marc Márquez returned to the track after missing the Argentine GP due to a case of diplopia. In the Moto2 class, Keminth Kubo missed the Grand Prix, as he was denied a visa for this event in the United States. Barry Baltus returned after missing the previous Grand Prix, due to a broken right wrist he suffered during a qualifying race for the Indonesian Grand Prix. In the Moto3 class, Gerard Riu replaced David Muñoz on the KTM of the Boé SKX team. David Salvador replaced John McPhee, driving the Husqvarna of the Sterilgarda Husqvarna Max team.

=== MotoGP Championship standings before the race. ===
Due to his first career victory in the Argentine GP, Aleix Espargaró took first place (for the first time in his career) with 45 points, 7 more than Brad Binder, 9 from Enea Bastianini and Álex Rins and 10 from Fabio Quartararo. In the constructors' championship standings, Ducati overtakes the KTM again (61 vs. 55 points). Aprilia is third, with 45 points, followed by Suzuki, at 37 points, 2 more than Yamaha; Honda closes the standings with 24 points. In the team championship standings, Team Suzuki Ecstar is the new leader, with 69 points, followed by Red Bull KTM Factory Racing, with 3 points behind. Followed by Aprilia Racing, with 58 points, Monster Energy Yamaha MotoGP, with 49 points and Pramac Racing, with 44 points.

=== Moto2 Championship standings before the race. ===
Celestino Vietti, winner of the previous Grand Prix, confirms himself as leader of the drivers' standings with 70 points and increases his advantage over his rivals: 21 points over Arón Canet, 25 over Somkiat Chantra, 34 over Ai Ogura and more than 35 over Sam Lowes. In the constructors' championship standings, led by Kalex (with a full 75 points). Boscoscuro was still at 10 points and in addition to this, MV Agusta scored their first points this season, with 1 point gained from the fifteenth place in Argentina by Marcos Ramírez. In the team championship standings, Idemitsu Honda Team Asia tops the standings with 81 points, followed by Mooney VR46 Racing Team, Elf Marc VDS Racing Team and Flexbox HP40 at 11, 17 and 20 points respectively. Red Bull KTM Ajo is fifth with 44 points.

=== Moto3 Championship standings before the race. ===
Sergio García claimed victory over Dennis Foggia at the Argentine Grand Prix, securing the lead in the drivers' championship standings with 58 points, compared to Foggia's 54. The two drivers hold a significant advantage over their closest competitors, Izan Guevara, Kaito Toba, and Deniz Öncü, who follow with 28, 27, and 26 points, respectively.

In the constructors' championship standings, Honda leads with 70 points, holding a five-point advantage over GasGas. KTM occupies third place with 37 points, followed by CFMoto (30 points) and Husqvarna (27 points).

In the team championship standings, the Solunion GasGas Aspar Team maintains its position at the top with 86 points, ahead of Leopard Racing, which trails by 15 points. CFMoto Racing Prüstel GP is third with 40 points, followed by MT Helmets - MSI (36 points) and CIP Green Power (34 points).

== Free practice ==
=== Combined Free Practice 1-2-3 ===
The top ten riders (written in bold) qualified in Q2.

Pos.	No.	Bikers	Constructor	Free practice times		
Pos.	No.	Bikers	Constructor	FP1	FP2	FP3
1	20	(France) **Fabio Quartararo**	**Yamaha**	2:04.450	2:02.884	**2:02.361**
2	23	(Italy) **Enea Bastianini**	**Ducati**	2:04.594	2:02.884	**2:02.420**
3	43	(Australia) **Jack Miller**	**Ducati**	2:04.437	2:02.789	**2:02.447**
4	93	(Spain) **Marc Márquez**	**Honda**	2:04.469	2:03.041	**2:02.490**
5	5	(France) **Johann Zarco**	**Ducati**	2:04.893	**2:02.542**	2:03.513
6	63	(Italy) **Francesco Bagnaia**	**Ducati**	2:05.003	2:03.187	**2:02.621**
7	44	(Spain) **Pol Espargaró**	**Honda**	2:04.581	2:03.438	**2:02.798**
8	36	(Spain) **Joan Mir**	**Suzuki**	2:04.900	2:03.143	**2:02.874**
9	30	(Japan) **Takaaki Nakagami**	**Honda**	2:04.744	2:04.074	**2:02.908**
10	10	(Italy) **Luca Marini**	**Ducati**	2:05.177	2:03.562	**2:02.921**
11	41	(Spain) Aleix Espargaró	Aprilia	2:04.686	2:03.370	**2:02.997**
12	42	(Spain) Álex Rins	Suzuki	2:04.007	**2:03.030**	2:03.072
13	12	(Spain) Maverick Viñales	Aprilia	2:04.015	**2:03.085**	2:03.354
14	21	(Italy) Franco Morbidelli	Yamaha	2:05.287	2:04.664	**2:03.086**
15	89	(Spain) Jorge Martín	Ducati	2:05.050	**2:03.355**	2:03.637
16	4	(Italy) Andrea Dovizioso	Yamaha	2:05.324	2:03.706	**2:03.370**
17	33	(South Africa) Brad Binder	KTM	2:04.983	**2:03.538**	2:03.622
18	73	(Spain) Álex Márquez	Honda	2:05.146	**2:03.795**	2:03.833
19	88	(Portugal) Miguel Oliveira	KTM	2:06.445	2:05.342	**2:03.949**
20	87	(Australia) Remy Gardner	KTM	2:05.672	2:04.535	**2:04.099**
21	40	(Australia) Darryn Binder	Yamaha	2:06.198	2:04.679	**2:04.296**
22	72	(Italy) Marco Bezzecchi	Ducati	2:05.386	2:04.463	**2:04.349**
23	49	(Italy) Fabio Di Giannantonio	Ducati	2:06.497	**2:04.367**	2:04.506
24	25	(Spain) Raúl Fernández	KTM	2:05.326	2:04.770	**2:04.542**
OFFICIAL MOTOGP COMBINED FREE PRACTICE TIMES REPORT

Fastest session lap

Personal Best lap

== Qualifying ==
=== MotoGP ===
Fastest session lap

Pos.	No.	Biker	Constructor	Qualifying times		Final grid	Row
Pos.	No.	Biker	Constructor	Q1	Q2	Final grid	Row
1	89	(Spain) Jorge Martín	Ducati	2:02.487	2:02.039	1	1
2	43	(Australia) Jack Miller	Ducati	Qualified in Q2	2:02.042	2	1
3	63	(Italy) Francesco Bagnaia	Ducati	Qualified in Q2	2:02.167	3	1
4	5	(France) Johann Zarco	Ducati	Qualified in Q2	2:02.570	4	2
5	23	(Italy) Enea Bastianini	Ducati	Qualified in Q2	2:02.578	5	2
6	20	(France) Fabio Quartararo	Yamaha	Qualified in Q2	2:02.634	6	2
7	42	(Spain) Álex Rins	Suzuki	2:02.723	2:02.694	7	3
8	36	(Spain) Joan Mir	Suzuki	Qualified in Q2	2:02.947	8	3
9	93	(Spain) Marc Márquez	Honda	Qualified in Q2	2:03.038	9	3
10	30	(Japan) Takaaki Nakagami	Honda	Qualified in Q2	2:03.054	10	4
11	10	(Italy) Luca Marini	Ducati	Qualified in Q2	2:03.059	11	4
12	44	(Spain) Pol Espargaró	Honda	Qualified in Q2	2:03.096	12	4
13	41	(Spain) Aleix Espargaró	Aprilia	2:02.922	N/A	13	5
14	12	(Spain) Maverick Viñales	Aprilia	2:03.121	N/A	14	5
15	4	(Italy) Andrea Dovizioso	Yamaha	2:03.133	N/A	15	5
16	72	(Italy) Marco Bezzecchi	Ducati	2:03.328	N/A	16	6
17	33	(South Africa) Brad Binder	KTM	2:03.467	N/A	17	6
18	49	(Italy) Fabio Di Giannantonio	Ducati	2:03.576	N/A	18	6
19	21	(Italy) Franco Morbidelli	Yamaha	2:03.579	N/A	19	7
20	88	(Portugal) Miguel Oliveira	KTM	2:03.983	N/A	20	7
21	25	(Spain) Raúl Fernández	KTM	2:04.140	N/A	21	7
22	87	(Australia) Remy Gardner	KTM	2:04.185	N/A	22	8
23	73	(Spain) Álex Márquez	Honda	2:04.229	N/A	23	8
24	40	(South Africa) Darryn Binder	Yamaha	2:04.646	N/A	24	8
OFFICIAL MOTOGP QUALIFYING RESULTS

=== Moto2 ===
Fastest session lap

Pos.	No.	Biker	Constructor	Qualifying times		Final grid	Row
Pos.	No.	Biker	Constructor	Q1	Q2	Final grid	Row
1	6	(United States) Cameron Beaubier	Kalex	Qualified in Q2	2:08.751	1	1
2	13	(Italy) Celestino Vietti	Kalex	2:09.807	2:09.091	2	1
3	40	(Spain) Arón Canet	Kalex	Qualified in Q2	2:09.283	3	1
4	14	(Italy) Tony Arbolino	Kalex	Qualified in Q2	2:09.329	4	2
5	75	(Spain) Albert Arenas	Kalex	Qualified in Q2	2:09.358	5	2
6	96	(United Kingdom) Jake Dixon	Kalex	Qualified in Q2	2:09.434	6	2
7	9	(Spain) Jorge Navarro	Kalex	Qualified in Q2	2:09.462	7	3
8	54	(Spain) Fermín Aldeguer	Boscocuro	Qualified in Q2	2:09.614	8	3
9	22	(United Kingdom) Sam Lowes	Kalex	Qualified in Q2	2:09.900	9	3
10	51	(Spain) Pedro Acosta	Kalex	Qualified in Q2	2:09.925	10	4
11	79	(Japan) Ai Ogura	Kalex	Qualified in Q2	2:10.003	11	4
12	64	(Netherlands) Bo Bendsneyder	Kalex	2:09.791	2:10.020	12	4
13	23	(Germany) Marcel Schrötter	Kalex	Qualified in Q2	2:10.069	13	5
14	42	(Spain) Marcos Ramírez	MV Agusta	2:10.154	2:10.127	14	5
15	52	(Spain) Jeremy Alcoba	Kalex	2:10.157	2:10.152	15	5
16	16	(United States) Joe Roberts	Kalex	Qualified in Q2	2:10.325	16	6
17	35	(Thailand) Somkiat Chantra	Kalex	Qualified in Q2	2:10.707	17	6
18	37	(Spain) Augusto Fernández	Kalex	Qualified in Q2	No time	18	6
19	12	(Czech Republic) Filip Salač	Kalex	2:10.209	N/A	19	7
20	7	(Belgium) Barry Baltus	Kalex	2:10.471	N/A	20	7
21	5	(Italy) Romano Fenati	Boscoscuro	2:10.599	N/A	21	7
22	84	(Netherlands) Zonta van den Goorbergh	Kalex	2:10.619	N/A	22	8
23	18	(Spain) Manuel González	Kalex	2:11.078	N/A	23	8
24	2	(Argentina) Gabriel Rodrigo	Kalex	2:11.113	N/A	24	8
25	19	(Italy) Lorenzo Dalla Porta	Kalex	2:11.288	N/A	25	9
26	61	(Italy) Alessandro Zaccone	Kalex	2:11.486	N/A	26	9
27	28	(Italy) Niccolò Antonelli	Kalex	2:13.291	N/A	27	9
28	4	(United States) Sean Dylan Kelly	Kalex	2:13.562	N/A	28	10
29	24	(Italy) Simone Corsi	MV Agusta	2:17.038	N/A	29	10
OFFICIAL MOTO2 QUALIFYING RESULTS

=== Moto3 ===
Fastest session lap

Pos.	No.	Biker	Constructor	Qualifying times		Final grid	Row
Pos.	No.	Biker	Constructor	Q1	Q2	Final grid	Row
1	16	(Italy) Andrea Migno	Honda	Qualified in Q2	2:15.184	1	1
2	7	(Italy) Dennis Foggia	Honda	Qualified in Q2	2:15.881	2	1
3	43	(Spain) Xavier Artigas	CFMoto	2:16.719	2:16.066	3	1
4	53	(Turkey) Deniz Öncü	KTM	Qualified in Q2	2:16.330	4	2
5	5	(Spain) Jaume Masià	KTM	Qualified in Q2	2:16.409	5	2
6	10	(Brazil) Diogo Moreira	KTM	Qualified in Q2	2:16.416	6	2
7	96	(Spain) Daniel Holgado	KTM	Qualified in Q2	2:16.551	7	3
8	27	(Japan) Kaito Toba	KTM	Qualified in Q2	2:26.282	8	3
9	71	(Japan) Ayumu Sasaki	Husqvarna	Qualified in Q2	2:16.604	9	3
10	28	(Spain) Sergio García	Gas Gas	Qualified in Q2	2:16.609	10	4
11	82	(Italy) Stefano Nepa	KTM	2:17.054	2:16.727	11	4
12	19	(United Kingdom) Scott Ogden	Honda	2:16.871	2:16.856	12	4
13	23	(Italy) Elia Bartolini	KTM	2:17.590	2:16.907	29	10
14	99	(Spain) Carlos Tatay	CFMoto	Qualified in Q2	2:16.946	13	5
15	11	(Spain) Sergio García	Gas Gas	Qualified in Q2	2:17.114	14	5
16	24	(Japan) Tatsuki Suzuki	Honda	Qualified in Q2	2:17.515	15	5
17	54	(Italy) Riccardo Rossi	Honda	Qualified in Q2	2:17.651	16	6
18	66	(Australia) Joel Kelso	KTM	Qualified in Q2	2:17.771	17	6
19	31	(Spain) Adrián Fernández	KTM	2:17.659	N/A	18	6
20	18	(Italy) Matteo Bertelle	KTM	2:17.672	N/A	19	7
21	6	(Japan) Ryusei Yamanaka	KTM	2:17.877	N/A	20	7
22	48	(Spain) Iván Ortolá	KTM	2:18.005	N/A	21	7
23	87	(Spain) Gerard Riu	KTM	2:18.345	N/A	22	8
24	38	(Spain) David Salvador	Husqvarna	2:18.407	N/A	23	8
25	72	(Japan) Taiyo Furusato	Honda	2:18.481	N/A	24	8
26	22	(Spain) Ana Carrasco	KTM	2:19.699	N/A	25	9
27	70	(United Kingdom) Joshua Whatley	Honda	2:19.935	N/A	26	9
NC	64	(Indonesia) Mario Aji	Honda	No time	N/A	27	9
NC	20	(France) Lorenzo Fellon	Honda	No time	N/A	28	10
DNS	67	(Italy) Alberto Surra	Honda	Did not start			
OFFICIAL MOTO3 QUALIFYING RESULTS

== Race ==
=== MotoGP ===
Pos.	No.	Rider	Team	Manufacturer	Laps	Time/Retired	Grid	Points
1	23	(Italy) Enea Bastianini	Gresini Racing MotoGP	Ducati	20	41:23.111	5	25
2	42	(Spain) Álex Rins	Team Suzuki Ecstar	Suzuki	20	+2.058	7	20
3	43	(Australia) Jack Miller	Ducati Lenovo Team	Ducati	20	+2.312	2	16
4	36	(Spain) Joan Mir	Team Suzuki Ecstar	Suzuki	20	+3.975	8	13
5	63	(Italy) Francesco Bagnaia	Ducati Lenovo Team	Ducati	20	+6.045	3	11
6	93	(Spain) Marc Márquez	Repsol Honda Team	Honda	20	+6.617	9	10
7	20	(France) Fabio Quartararo	Monster Energy Yamaha MotoGP	Yamaha	20	+6.760	6	9
8	89	(Spain) Jorge Martín	Pramac Racing	Ducati	20	+8.441	1	8
9	5	(France) Johann Zarco	Pramac Racing	Ducati	20	+12.375	4	7
10	12	(Spain) Maverick Viñales	Aprilia Racing	Aprilia	20	+12.642	14	6
11	41	(Spain) Aleix Espargaró	Aprilia Racing	Aprilia	20	+12.947	13	5
12	33	(South Africa) Brad Binder	Red Bull KTM Factory Racing	KTM	20	+13.376	17	4
13	44	(Spain) Pol Espargaró	Repsol Honda Team	Honda	20	+17.961	12	3
14	30	(Japan) Takaaki Nakagami	LCR Honda Idemitsu	Honda	20	+18.770	10	2
15	4	(Italy) Andrea Dovizioso	WithU Yamaha RNF MotoGP Team	Yamaha	20	+29.319	15	1
16 (Note: One-position penalty for exceeding track limits on the last lap.)	21	(Italy) Franco Morbidelli	Monster Energy Yamaha MotoGP	Yamaha	20	+29.129	19	
17	10	(Italy) Luca Marini	Mooney VR46 Racing Team	Ducati	20	+29.630	11	
18	88	(Portugal) Miguel Oliveira	Red Bull KTM Factory Racing	KTM	20	+32.002	20	
19	25	(Spain) Raúl Fernández	Tech3 KTM Factory Racing	KTM	20	+37.062	21	
20	87	(Australia) Remy Gardner	Tech3 KTM Factory Racing	KTM	20	+42.442	22	
21	49	(Italy) Fabio Di Giannantonio	Gresini Racing MotoGP	Ducati	20	+42.887	18	
22	40	(South Africa) Darryn Binder	WithU Yamaha RNF MotoGP Team	Yamaha	20	+1:42.171	24	
Ret	73	(Spain) Álex Márquez	LCR Honda Castrol	Honda	5	Accident	23	
Ret	72	(Italy) Marco Bezzecchi	Mooney VR46 Racing Team	Ducati	2	Accident	16	
Fastest lap: (Italy) Enea Bastianini (Ducati) – 2:03.251 (lap 14)

=== Moto2 ===
Pos.	No.	Biker	Constructor	Laps	Time/Retired	Grid	Points
1	14	(Italy) Tony Arbolino	Kalex	18	39:06.552	4	25
2	79	(Japan) Ai Ogura	Kalex	18	+3.439	11	20
3	96	(United Kingdom) Jake Dixon	Kalex	18	+4.787	6	16
4	23	(Germany) Marcel Schrötter	Kalex	18	+14.529	13	13
5	9	(Spain) Jorge Navarro	Kalex	18	+16.347	7	11
6	52	(Spain) Jeremy Alcoba	Kalex	18	+17.388	15	10
7	64	(Netherlands) Bo Bendsneyder	Kalex	18	+17.631	12	9
8	16	(United States) Joe Roberts	Kalex	18	+19.784	16	8
9	37	(Spain) Augusto Fernández	Kalex	18	+24.595	18	7
10	7	(Belgium) Barry Baltus	Kalex	18	+30.291	20	6
11	75	(Spain) Albert Arenas	Kalex	18	+33.475	5	5
12	42	(Spain) Marcos Ramírez	MV Agusta	18	+34.785	14	4
13	18	(Spain) Manuel González	Kalex	18	+34.988	23	3
14	12	(Czech Republic) Filip Salač	Kalex	18	+37.786	19	2
15	5	(Italy) Romano Fenati	Boscoscuro	18	+38.408	21	1
16	19	(Italy) Lorenzo Dalla Porta	Kalex	18	+1:19.999	25	
17	4	(United States) Sean Dylan Kelly	Kalex	18	+1:24.437	28	
Ret	6	(United States) Cameron Beaubier	Kalex	17	Accident	1	
Ret	28	(Italy) Niccolò Antonelli	Kalex	12	Illness	27	
Ret	40	(Spain) Arón Canet	Kalex	7	Accident	3	
Ret	13	(Italy) Celestino Vietti	Kalex	4	Accident	2	
Ret	51	(Spain) Pedro Acosta	Kalex	3	Accident	10	
Ret	61	(Italy) Alessandro Zaccone	Kalex	3	Retired	26	
Ret	24	(Italy) Simone Corsi	MV Agusta	2	Accident	29	
Ret	2	(Argentina) Gabriel Rodrigo	Kalex	0	Collision	24	
Ret	35	(Thailand) Somkiat Chantra	Kalex	0	Collision	17	
Ret	22	(United Kingdom) Sam Lowes	Kalex	0	Collision	9	
Ret	54	(Spain) Fermín Aldeguer	Boscoscuro	0	Collision	8	
Ret	84	(Netherlands) Zonta van den Goorbergh	Kalex	0	Collision	22	
Fastest lap: (Spain) Arón Canet (Kalex) – 2:09.312 (lap 2)
OFFICIAL MOTO2 RACE REPORT

=== Moto3 ===
Pos.	No.	Biker	Constructor	Laps	Time/Retired	Grid	Points
1	5	(Spain) Jaume Masià	KTM	17	38:58.286	5	25
2	7	(Italy) Dennis Foggia	Honda	17	+0.172	2	20
3	16	(Italy) Andrea Migno	Honda	17	+0.394	1	16
4	71	(Japan) Ayumu Sasaki	Husqvarna	17	+0.490	9	13
5	53	(Turkey) Deniz Öncü	KTM	17	+1.113	4	11
6	43	(Spain) Xavier Artigas	CFMoto	17	+1.576	3	10
7	28	(Spain) Izan Guevara	Gas Gas	17	+2.887	10	9
8	99	(Spain) Carlos Tatay	CFMoto	17	+8.208	13	8
9	54	(Italy) Riccardo Rossi	Honda	17	+8.370	16	7
10	24	(Japan) Tatsuki Suzuki	Honda	17	+8.478	15	6
11	48	(Spain) Iván Ortolá	KTM	17	+10.084	21	5
12	19	(United Kingdom) Scott Ogden	Honda	17	+10.272	12	4
13	82	(Italy) Stefano Nepa	KTM	17	+10.424	11	3
14	31	(Spain) Adrián Fernández	KTM	17	+17.967	18	2
15	20	(France) Lorenzo Fellon	Honda	17	+18.088	27	1
16	72	(Japan) Taiyo Furusato	Honda	17	+20.563	24	
17	6	(Japan) Ryusei Yamanaka	KTM	17	+21.433	20	
18	66	(Australia) Joel Kelso	KTM	17	+21.959	17	
19	23	(Italy) Elia Bartolini	KTM	17	+29.099	29	
20	87	(Spain) Gerard Riu	KTM	17	+34.336	22	
21 (Note: One-position penalty for exceeding track limits on the last lap.)	64	(Indonesia) Mario Aji	Honda	17	+34.295	28	
22	38	(Spain) David Salvador	Husqvarna	17	+39.396	23	
23	22	(Spain) Ana Carrasco	KTM	17	+1:02.131	25	
Ret	96	(Spain) Daniel Holgado	KTM	16	Collision	7	
Ret	27	(Japan) Kaito Toba	KTM	16	Collision	8	
Ret	10	(Brazil) Diogo Moreira	KTM	15	Accident	6	
Ret	18	(Italy) Matteo Bertelle	KTM	15	Accident	19	
Ret	11	(Spain) Sergio García	Gas Gas	12	Accident Damage	14	
Ret	70	(United Kingdom) Joshua Whatley	Honda	5	Illness	26	
DNS	67	(Italy) Alberto Surra	Honda		Did not start		
Fastest lap: (Spain) Jaume Masià (KTM) – 2:16.179 (lap 7)
OFFICIAL MOTO3 RACE REPORT

- Alberto Surra was declared unfit for Sunday's race after a heavy crash in FP3 on Saturday morning.

== Championship standings after the race ==
Below are the standings for the top five riders, constructors, and teams after the round.

=== MotoGP ===
Riders' Championship standings

	Pos.	Rider	Points
2	1	(Italy) Enea Bastianini	61
2	2	(Spain) Álex Rins	56
2	3	(Spain) Aleix Espargaró	50
2	4	(Spain) Joan Mir	46
	5	(France) Fabio Quartararo	44

Constructors' Championship standings

	Pos.	Constructor	Points
	1	(Italy) Ducati	86
	2	(Austria) KTM	59
1	3	(Japan) Suzuki	57
1	4	(Italy) Aprilia	51
	5	(Japan) Yamaha	44

Teams' Championship standings

	Pos.	Team	Points
	1	(Japan) Team Suzuki Ecstar	102
	2	(Austria) Red Bull KTM Factory Racing	70
	3	(Italy) Aprilia Racing	69
2	4	(Italy) Gresini Racing MotoGP	61
	5	(Italy) Pramac Racing	59

=== Moto2 ===
Riders' Championship standings

	Pos.	Rider	Points
	1	(Italy) Celestino Vietti	70
2	2	(Japan) Ai Ogura	56
3	3	(Italy) Tony Arbolino	54
2	4	(Spain) Arón Canet	49
2	5	(Thailand) Somkiat Chantra	45

Constructors' Championship standings

Pos.	Constructor	Points
1	(Germany) Kalex	100
2	(Italy) Boscoscuro	11
3	(Italy) MV Agusta	5

Teams' Championship standings

	Pos.	Team	Points
	1	(Japan) Idemitsu Honda Team Asia	101
1	2	(Belgium) Elf Marc VDS Racing Team	89
1	3	(Spain) Flexbox HP40	72
2	4	(Italy) Mooney VR46 Racing Team	70
1	5	(Spain) Shimoko GasGas Aspar Team	54

=== Moto3 ===
Riders' Championship standings

	Pos.	Rider	Points
1	1	(Italy) Dennis Foggia	74
1	2	(Spain) Sergio García	58
3	3	(Italy) Andrea Migno	41
1	4	(Spain) Izan Guevara	37
	5	(Turkey) Deniz Öncü	37

Constructors' Championship standings

	Pos.	Constructor	Points
	1	(Japan) Honda	90
	2	(Spain) Gas Gas	74
	3	(Austria) KTM	62
1	4	(Sweden) Husqvarna	40
1	5	(China) CFMoto	40

Teams' Championship standings

	Pos.	Team	Points
1	1	(Luxembourg) Leopard Racing	97
1	2	(Spain) Gaviota GasGas Aspar Team	95
	3	(Germany) CFMoto Racing Prüstel GP	58
5	4	(Finland) Red Bull KTM Ajo	50
1	5	(France) Red Bull KTM Tech3	44

== Notes ==
Previous race: 2022 Argentine Grand Prix	FIM Grand Prix World Championship; 2022 season	Next race: 2022 Portuguese Grand Prix
Previous race: 2021 Grand Prix of the Americas	Motorcycle Grand Prix of the Americas	Next race: 2023 Grand Prix of the Americas
