= 2023 Moto3 World Championship =

12th running of the Moto3 World Championship

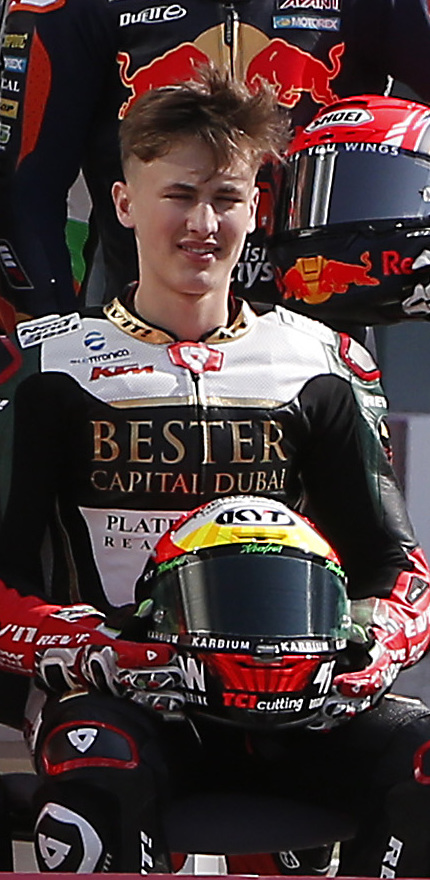
Jaume Masià (pictured in 2019) was the 2023 Moto3 World Riders' Champion.

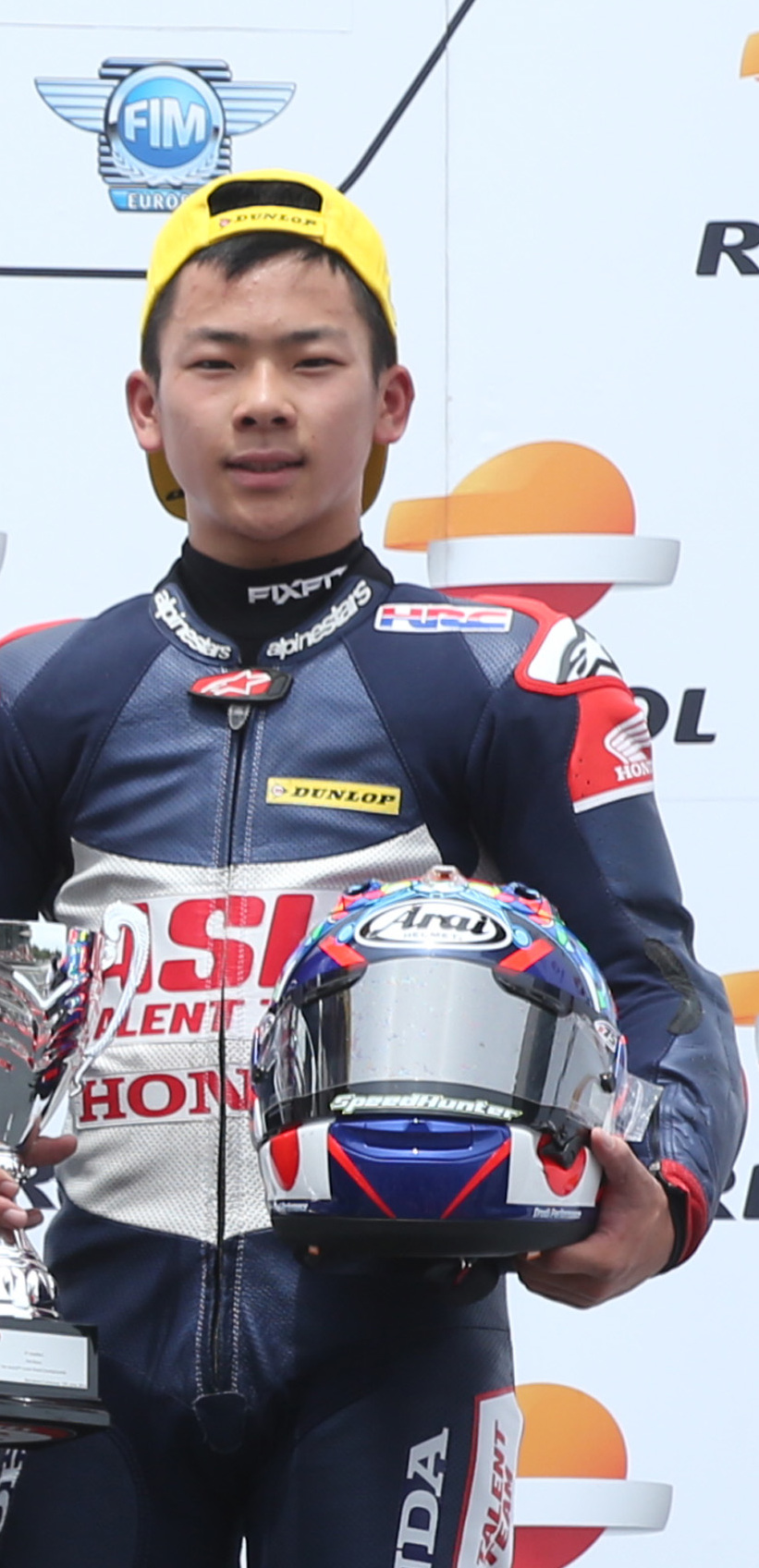
Ayumu Sasaki (pictured in 2016) finished runner-up.

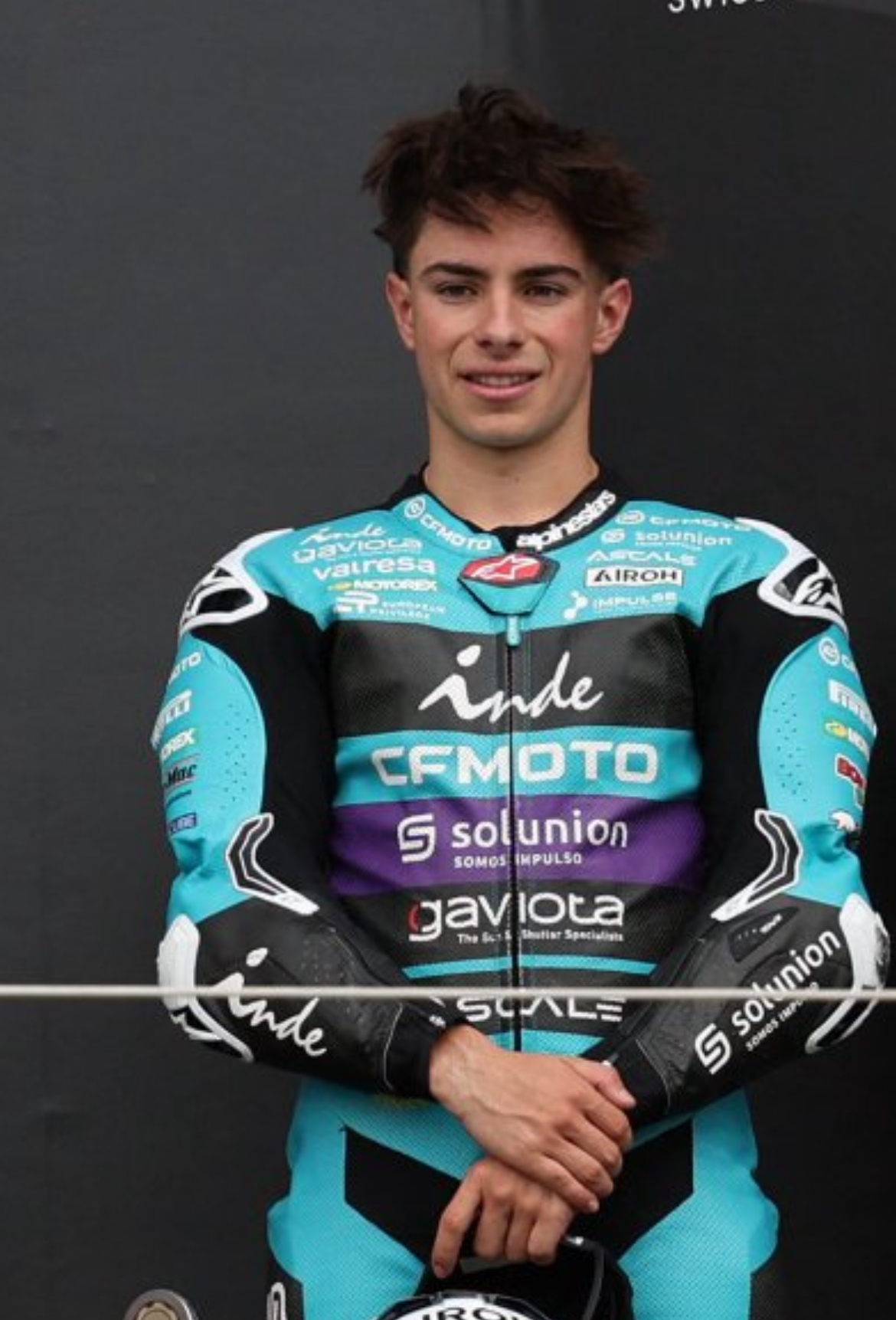
David Alonso (pictured in 2025) finished third and was the 2023 Moto3 Rookie of the Year.

The 2023 FIM Moto3 World Championship was the lightweight class of the 75th Fédération Internationale de Motocyclisme (FIM) Road Racing World Championship season. Jaume Masià won the championship with one race to spare after winning the Grand Prix of Qatar.

== Teams and riders ==
Team	Constructor	Motorcycle	No.	Rider	Rounds
(Germany) CFMoto Racing Prüstel GP	CFMoto	Moto3	43	(Spain) Xavier Artigas	All
(Germany) CFMoto Racing Prüstel GP	CFMoto	Moto3	66	(Australia) Joel Kelso	1, 4–20
(Germany) CFMoto Racing Prüstel GP	CFMoto	Moto3	92	(Spain) David Almansa	2–3
(Germany) CFMoto Racing Prüstel GP	CFMoto	Moto3	12	(Switzerland) Noah Dettwiler	10
(Spain) GasGas Aspar Team (Note: This is the team name entered in the championship. Other team names used during the season are AutoSolar GasGas Aspar M3 (rounds 1–2), Valresa GasGas Aspar M3 (rounds 3, 6, 8), Gaviota GasGas Aspar M3 (rounds 4–5, 7, 9), Gaviota GasGas Aspar Team (rounds 11–19), and Valresa GasGas Aspar Team (round 20).)	GasGas	RC250GP	6	(Japan) Ryusei Yamanaka	All
(Spain) GasGas Aspar Team	GasGas	RC250GP	80	(Colombia) David Alonso	All
(Japan) Honda Team Asia	Honda	NSF250RW	64	(Indonesia) Mario Aji	All
(Japan) Honda Team Asia	Honda	NSF250RW	72	(Japan) Taiyo Furusato	All
(Japan) Honda Team Asia	Honda	NSF250RW	33	(Thailand) Tatchakorn Buasri	7, 10–11, 17
(Japan) Honda Team Asia	Honda	NSF250RW	93	(Indonesia) Fadillah Arbi Aditama	15
(Luxembourg) Leopard Racing	Honda	NSF250RW	5	(Spain) Jaume Masià	All
(Luxembourg) Leopard Racing	Honda	NSF250RW	24	(Japan) Tatsuki Suzuki	1–6, 9–14
(Luxembourg) Leopard Racing	Honda	NSF250RW	31	(Spain) Adrián Fernández	7–8
(Luxembourg) Leopard Racing	Honda	NSF250RW	31	(Spain) Adrián Fernández	15–20
(Italy) Rivacold Snipers Team	Honda	NSF250RW	18	(Italy) Matteo Bertelle	All
(Italy) Rivacold Snipers Team	Honda	NSF250RW	55	(Italy) Romano Fenati	1–13, 18–20
(Italy) Rivacold Snipers Team	Honda	NSF250RW	92	(Spain) David Almansa	14
(Italy) Rivacold Snipers Team	Honda	NSF250RW	9	(Italy) Nicola Carraro	15–17
(Italy) Sic58 Squadra Corse	Honda	NSF250RW	27	(Japan) Kaito Toba	All
(Italy) Sic58 Squadra Corse	Honda	NSF250RW	54	(Italy) Riccardo Rossi	All
(United Kingdom) VisionTrack Racing Team	Honda	NSF250RW	19	(United Kingdom) Scott Ogden	All
(United Kingdom) VisionTrack Racing Team	Honda	NSF250RW	70	(United Kingdom) Joshua Whatley	1–19
(United Kingdom) Petronas MIE/MLav Racing	Honda	NSF250RW	3	(India) KY Ahamed	13
(United Kingdom) Petronas MIE/MLav Racing	Honda	NSF250RW	57	(Malaysia) Danial Shahril	13
(Germany) Liqui Moly Husqvarna Intact GP	Husqvarna	FR250GP	71	(Japan) Ayumu Sasaki	All
(Germany) Liqui Moly Husqvarna Intact GP	Husqvarna	FR250GP	95	(Netherlands) Collin Veijer	All
(Germany) Finetwork Intact GP	Husqvarna	FR250GP	92	(Spain) David Almansa	4, 11, 20 (Note: David Almansa was entered as a wildcard rider for the first Friday practice session during round 20, before being replaced by Marcos Ruda due to injury.)
(Germany) Finetwork Intact GP	Husqvarna	FR250GP	69	(Spain) Marcos Ruda	20
(Italy) Angeluss MTA Team	KTM	RC250GP	48	(Spain) Iván Ortolá	All
(Italy) Angeluss MTA Team	KTM	RC250GP	82	(Italy) Stefano Nepa	All
(Spain) Boé Motorsports	KTM	RC250GP	22	(Spain) Ana Carrasco	1–15
(Spain) Boé Motorsports	KTM	RC250GP	21	(Spain) Vicente Pérez	16–20
(Spain) Boé Motorsports	KTM	RC250GP	44	(Spain) David Muñoz	1–4, 7–20
(Spain) Boé Motorsports	KTM	RC250GP	21	(Spain) Vicente Pérez	6
Yamaha Thailand Racing – Boé	KTM	RC250GP	32	(Thailand) Krittapat Keankum	17
(France) CIP Green Power	KTM	RC250GP	20	(France) Lorenzo Fellon	1, 9–20
(France) CIP Green Power	KTM	RC250GP	16	(Italy) Andrea Migno	2–8
(France) CIP Green Power	KTM	RC250GP	38	(Spain) David Salvador	1–13, 16–20
(France) CIP Green Power	KTM	RC250GP	12	(Switzerland) Noah Dettwiler	15
(Spain) MT Helmets – MSi	KTM	RC250GP	10	(Brazil) Diogo Moreira	All
(Spain) MT Helmets – MSi	KTM	RC250GP	63	(Malaysia) Syarifuddin Azman	1–6, 8–20
(Spain) MT Helmets – MSi	KTM	RC250GP	57	(Malaysia) Danial Shahril	7
(Spain) MT Helmets – MSi	KTM	RC250GP	58	(Italy) Luca Lunetta	6
(Finland) Red Bull KTM Ajo	KTM	RC250GP	53	(Turkey) Deniz Öncü	All
(Finland) Red Bull KTM Ajo	KTM	RC250GP	99	(Spain) José Antonio Rueda	All
(France) Red Bull KTM Tech3	KTM	RC250GP	7	(Italy) Filippo Farioli	All
(France) Red Bull KTM Tech3	KTM	RC250GP	96	(Spain) Daniel Holgado	All

Key
Regular rider
Replacement rider
Wildcard rider

All teams used series-specified Dunlop tyres.

=== Team changes ===
- Intact GP entered the Moto3 class with Husqvarna and will be managed by Peter Öttl. This is Intact GP's third team across all classes, having a Moto2 team since 2013 and a MotoE team since 2019. The team replaced Max Biaggi's Max Racing Team who left the championship after four seasons. Max Racing Team was also previously managed by Öttl during its time in Moto3.
- QJmotor Avintia Racing Team left the championship after five seasons.

=== Rider changes ===
- Dennis Foggia left Leopard Racing as he was promoted to Moto2. He was replaced by Jaume Masià, who moved from Red Bull KTM Ajo. Masià has previously raced with Leopard Racing in 2020.
- Joel Kelso moved to CFMoto Racing Prüstel GP from CIP Green Power, replacing Carlos Tatay who was left without a ride in 2023.
- Daniel Holgado and Filippo Farioli raced for Red Bull KTM Tech3, replacing Adrián Fernández, who was left without a ride in 2023, and Deniz Öncü. Holgado moved from Red Bull KTM Ajo, while Farioli made his Grand Prix racing debut, having raced in both Red Bull MotoGP Rookies Cup and FIM JuniorGP World Championship in 2022.
- Ryusei Yamanaka and David Alonso raced for GasGas Aspar Team, replacing Sergio García and Izan Guevara who were both be promoted to Moto2. Yamanaka moved from MT Helmets – MSi, while Alonso made his full-time debut in Moto3, having served as a replacement and wildcard rider in 2021 and 2022.
- Kaito Toba moved to Sic58 Squadra Corse from CIP Green Power, replacing Lorenzo Fellon.
- Romano Fenati and Matteo Bertelle raced for Rivacold Snipers Team, replacing Andrea Migno and Alberto Surra, who were both left without rides in 2023. Fenati returned to the Moto3 class, having raced in Moto2 in 2022, but was sacked midway through the season. He has previously raced with the Snipers team in 2017 and 2019. Meanwhile, Bertelle moved from the now defunct QJmotor Avintia Racing Team.
- Deniz Öncü and José Antonio Rueda raced for Red Bull KTM Ajo, replacing Jaume Masià and Daniel Holgado. Öncü moved from Red Bull KTM Tech3. Rueda, who is both the 2022 FIM JuniorGP World Champion and Red Bull MotoGP Rookies Cup winner, made his full-time debut in Moto3, having served as a replacement rider in 2021 and 2022.
- Ayumu Sasaki and Collin Veijer raced for the newly-formed Liqui Moly Husqvarna Intact GP. Sasaki moved from the now defunct Max Racing Team, while Veijer made his Grand Prix racing debut, having raced in both the Red Bull MotoGP Rookies Cup and FIM JuniorGP World Championship in 2022.
- Syarifuddin Azman made his full-time debut in Moto3 with MT Helmets – MSi, replacing Ryusei Yamanaka. Syarifuddin previously served as a replacement and wildcard rider in 2021 and 2022. He also raced in the FIM JuniorGP World Championship in 2022.
- Lorenzo Fellon and David Salvador raced for CIP Green Power, replacing Kaito Toba and Joel Kelso. Fellon moved from Sic58 Squadra Corse, while Salvador made his full-time debut in Moto3, having served as a replacement rider in 2021 and 2022.
- Elia Bartolini, who raced for the now defunct QJmotor Avintia Racing Team, was left without a ride in 2023.
- John McPhee, who raced for the now defunct Max Racing Team, left Moto3 for the Supersport World Championship as he is above the age limit of 28 when the season started.

==== Mid-season changes ====
- Lorenzo Fellon missed seven Grands Prix starting from the Argentine round after suffering a dislocated shoulder during the warm-up lap of the Portuguese race. He was replaced for all races by Andrea Migno.
- Joel Kelso missed the Argentine and Americas rounds after suffering a fractured ankle at the cooldown lap of the Portuguese race. He was replaced for both races by David Almansa.
- David Muñoz missed the French and Italian rounds after suffering a left heel fracture from a crash during Q2 of the Spanish round. He was not replaced for the French round, but was replaced by Vicente Pérez for the Italian round.
- Syarifuddin Azman missed the German round after suffering a broken rib from a crash during P2 of the Italian round. He was replaced by Danial Shahril.
- Tatsuki Suzuki missed the German and Dutch rounds after suffering a multiple fracture in his left hand and foot from a crash during the Italian race. He was replaced for both races by Adrián Fernández. Suzuki raced for Leopard Racing from the start of the season but parted ways with the team after the Japanese round. He was again replaced by Fernández for the rest of the season, starting from the Indonesian round.
- Romano Fenati missed the Japanese, Indonesian, Australian, and Thailand rounds due to a fractured foot sustained from a crash during P2 of the Indian round. He was replaced by David Almansa for the Japanese round, and by Nicola Carraro for the Indonesian, Australian, and Thailand rounds.
- David Salvador missed the Japanese and Indonesian rounds due to a knee injury sustained during the Indian race. He was not replaced for the Japanese round, but was replaced by Noah Dettwiler for the Indonesian round.
- Ana Carrasco missed the final five rounds due to an ankle injury sustained during the Indonesian race. She was replaced for all races by Vicente Pérez.
- Joshua Whatley missed the Valencian round after suffering a broken tibia and fibula from a crash during the previous Qatar race. He was not replaced.
- David Almansa competed during P1 of the Valencian round as a wildcard rider, but was declared unfit after suffering an injury. He was replaced by Marcos Ruda for the rest of the weekend.

== Regulation changes ==
The minimum age to have a license for Moto3 was raised to 18 years old.

== Calendar ==
The following Grands Prix took place in 2023:

Round	Date	Grand Prix	Circuit
1	26 March	Grande Prémio Tissot de Portugal	Algarve International Circuit, Portimão
2	2 April	Gran Premio Michelin de la República Argentina	Autódromo Termas de Río Hondo, Termas de Río Hondo
3	16 April	(United States) Red Bull Grand Prix of the Americas	Circuit of the Americas, Austin
4	30 April	(Spain) Gran Premio MotoGP Guru by Gryfyn de España	Circuito de Jerez, Jerez de la Frontera
5	14 May	Shark Grand Prix de France	Bugatti Circuit, Le Mans
6	11 June	(Italy) Gran Premio d'Italia Oakley	Mugello Circuit, Scarperia e San Piero
7	18 June	(Germany) Liqui Moly Motorrad Grand Prix Deutschland	Sachsenring, Hohenstein-Ernstthal
8	25 June	(Netherlands) Motul TT Assen	TT Circuit Assen, Assen
9	6 August	(United Kingdom) Monster Energy British Grand Prix	Silverstone Circuit, Silverstone
10	20 August	(Austria) CryptoData Motorrad Grand Prix von Österreich	Red Bull Ring, Spielberg
11	3 September	(Catalonia) Gran Premi Monster Energy de Catalunya	Circuit de Barcelona-Catalunya, Montmeló
12	10 September	Gran Premio Red Bull di San Marino e della Riviera di Rimini	Misano World Circuit, Misano Adriatico
13	24 September	IndianOil Grand Prix of India	Buddh International Circuit, Greater Noida
14	1 October	Motul Grand Prix of Japan	Motegi Circuit, Motegi
15	15 October	Pertamina Grand Prix of Indonesia	Mandalika International Street Circuit, Mandalika
16	22 October	(Australia) MotoGP Guru by Gryfyn Australian Motorcycle Grand Prix	Phillip Island Grand Prix Circuit, Phillip Island
17	29 October	OR Thailand Grand Prix	Buriram International Circuit, Buriram
18	12 November	Petronas Grand Prix of Malaysia	Sepang International Circuit, Sepang
19	19 November (Note: Night race)	Qatar Airways Grand Prix of Qatar	Lusail International Circuit, Lusail
20	26 November	(Valencian Community) Gran Premio Motul de la Comunitat Valenciana	Circuit Ricardo Tormo, Valencia
Cancelled Grand Prix
–	~~9 July~~	Kazakhstan motorcycle Grand Prix	Sokol International Racetrack, Almaty

=== Grand Prix locations ===
Location of non-European Grands Prix in 2023.
(scheduled Grand Prix: cancelled Grand Prix)
Location of European Grands Prix in 2023.

=== Calendar changes ===
- For the first time since 2006, Lusail in Qatar did not host the opening round due to "extensive renovation and remodelling to the paddock area and circuit facilities".
- The British Grand Prix returned to the International Paddock of the Silverstone Circuit for the first time since 2012.
- India and Kazakhstan were both scheduled to host their first World Championship motorcycle Grands Prix in 2023 at the Buddh International Circuit and the Sokol International Racetrack, respectively.
- The Hungarian Grand Prix was scheduled to make its debut in 2023 but was postponed until at least 2024 due to the unstarted construction of the circuit.
- The Aragon Grand Prix was omitted from the schedule for the first time since its introduction in 2010.
- The Finnish Grand Prix at Kymi Ring was under contract to feature in 2023, but was not included in the provisional calendar due to safety concerns of the 2022 Russian invasion of Ukraine.
- The Kazakhstan Grand Prix at Sokol International Racetrack was cancelled due to ongoing homologation works at the circuit, paired with global operational challenges. The event was not replaced.

== Results and standings ==
=== Grands Prix ===
Round	Grand Prix	Pole position	Fastest lap	Winning rider	Winning team	Winning constructor	Report
1	(Portugal) Portuguese motorcycle Grand Prix	(Japan) Ayumu Sasaki	(Turkey) Deniz Öncü	(Spain) Daniel Holgado	(France) Red Bull KTM Tech3	(Austria) KTM	Report
2	(Argentina) Argentine Republic motorcycle Grand Prix	(Japan) Ayumu Sasaki	(Spain) Jaume Masià	(Japan) Tatsuki Suzuki	(Luxembourg) Leopard Racing	(Japan) Honda	Report
3	(United States) Motorcycle Grand Prix of the Americas	(Spain) Jaume Masià	(Spain) Iván Ortolá	(Spain) Iván Ortolá	(Italy) Angeluss MTA Team	(Austria) KTM	Report
4	(Spain) Spanish motorcycle Grand Prix	(Turkey) Deniz Öncü	(Japan) Ryusei Yamanaka	(Spain) Iván Ortolá	(Italy) Angeluss MTA Team	(Austria) KTM	Report
5	(France) French motorcycle Grand Prix	(Japan) Ayumu Sasaki	(Japan) Ayumu Sasaki	(Spain) Daniel Holgado	(France) Red Bull KTM Tech3	(Austria) KTM	Report
6	(Italy) Italian motorcycle Grand Prix	(Turkey) Deniz Öncü	(Japan) Ayumu Sasaki	(Spain) Daniel Holgado	(France) Red Bull KTM Tech3	(Austria) KTM	Report
7	(Germany) German motorcycle Grand Prix	(Japan) Ayumu Sasaki	(Spain) Daniel Holgado	(Turkey) Deniz Öncü	(Finland) Red Bull KTM Ajo	(Austria) KTM	Report
8	(Netherlands) Dutch TT	(Spain) David Muñoz	(Spain) Iván Ortolá	(Spain) Jaume Masià	(Luxembourg) Leopard Racing	(Japan) Honda	Report
9	(United Kingdom) British motorcycle Grand Prix	(Spain) Jaume Masià	(Netherlands) Collin Veijer	(Colombia) David Alonso	(Spain) Gaviota GasGas Aspar M3	(Spain) GasGas	Report
10	(Austria) Austrian motorcycle Grand Prix	(Netherlands) Collin Veijer	(Colombia) David Alonso	(Turkey) Deniz Öncü	(Finland) Red Bull KTM Ajo	(Austria) KTM	Report
11	(Catalonia) Catalan motorcycle Grand Prix	(Turkey) Deniz Öncü (Note: Iván Ortolá set the fastest time in qualifying and started the race from pole position but almost a month after was disqualified, along with Joel Kelso, from qualifying and the race for failing oil sample tests. Deniz Öncü, who qualified and started second, inherited the pole position statistic.)	(Spain) Daniel Holgado	(Colombia) David Alonso	(Spain) Gaviota GasGas Aspar Team	(Spain) GasGas	Report
12	San Marino and Rimini Riviera motorcycle Grand Prix	(Spain) Jaume Masià	(Colombia) David Alonso	(Colombia) David Alonso	(Spain) Gaviota GasGas Aspar Team	(Spain) GasGas	Report
13	(India) Indian motorcycle Grand Prix	(Spain) Jaume Masià	(Japan) Ayumu Sasaki	(Spain) Jaume Masià	(Luxembourg) Leopard Racing	(Japan) Honda	Report
14	(Japan) Japanese motorcycle Grand Prix	(Spain) Jaume Masià	(Japan) Ayumu Sasaki	(Spain) Jaume Masià	(Luxembourg) Leopard Racing	(Japan) Honda	Report
15	(Indonesia) Indonesian motorcycle Grand Prix	(Brazil) Diogo Moreira	(Spain) Iván Ortolá	(Brazil) Diogo Moreira	(Spain) MT Helmets – MSi	(Austria) KTM	Report
16	(Australia) Australian motorcycle Grand Prix	(Japan) Ayumu Sasaki	(Turkey) Deniz Öncü	(Turkey) Deniz Öncü	(Finland) Red Bull KTM Ajo	(Austria) KTM	Report
17	Thailand motorcycle Grand Prix	(Turkey) Deniz Öncü	(Turkey) Deniz Öncü	(Colombia) David Alonso	(Spain) Gaviota GasGas Aspar Team	(Spain) GasGas	Report
18	(Malaysia) Malaysian motorcycle Grand Prix	(Spain) Jaume Masià	(Japan) Ayumu Sasaki	(Netherlands) Collin Veijer	(Germany) Liqui Moly Husqvarna Intact GP	(Sweden) Husqvarna	Report
19	Qatar motorcycle Grand Prix	(Spain) Daniel Holgado	(Japan) Ayumu Sasaki	(Spain) Jaume Masià	(Luxembourg) Leopard Racing	(Japan) Honda	Report
20	Valencian Community motorcycle Grand Prix	(Netherlands) Collin Veijer	(Colombia) David Alonso	(Japan) Ayumu Sasaki	(Germany) Liqui Moly Husqvarna Intact GP	(Sweden) Husqvarna	Report

=== Riders' standings ===
Scoring system

Points were awarded to the top fifteen finishers. A rider had to finish the race to earn points.

Position	1st	2nd	3rd	4th	5th	6th	7th	8th	9th	10th	11th	12th	13th	14th	15th
Points	25	20	16	13	11	10	9	8	7	6	5	4	3	2	1

Pos.	Rider	Bike	Team	POR (Portugal)	ARG (Argentina)	AME (United States)	SPA (Spain)	FRA (France)	ITA (Italy)	GER (Germany)	NED (Netherlands)	GBR (United Kingdom)	AUT (Austria)	CAT (Catalonia)	RSM (San Marino)	IND (India)	JPN (Japan)	INA (Indonesia)	AUS (Australia)	THA (Thailand)	MAL (Malaysia)	QAT (Qatar)	VAL (Valencian Community)	Pts
1	(Spain) Jaume Masià	Honda	Leopard Racing	5	Ret^{F}	2^{P}	3	3	5	6	1	18^{P}	Ret	2	2^{P}	1^{P}	1^{P}	6	8	4	3^{P}	1	13	274
2	(Japan) Ayumu Sasaki	Husqvarna	Liqui Moly Husqvarna Intact GP	6^{P}	Ret^{P}	Ret	4	2^{P F}	3^{F}	2^{P}	2	2	3	4	7	3^{F}	2^{F}	18	2^{P}	Ret	2^{F}	6^{F}	1	268
3	(Colombia) David Alonso	GasGas	GasGas Aspar Team	Ret	14	8	2	8	4	5	13	1	29^{F}	1	1^{F}	5	7	2	Ret	1	Ret	2	2^{F}	245
4	(Turkey) Deniz Öncü	KTM	Red Bull KTM Ajo	10^{F}	24	6	9^{P}	6	2^{P}	1	3	11	1	11^{P}	3	14	Ret	8	1^{F}	5^{P F}	11	3	5	223
5	(Spain) Daniel Holgado	KTM	Red Bull KTM Tech3	1	4	5	6	1	1	3^{F}	25	3	2	20^{F}	16	4	3	14	13	6	Ret	9^{P}	8	220
6	(Spain) Iván Ortolá	KTM	Angeluss MTA Team	Ret	19	1^{F}	1	4	11	4	4^{F}	4	5	DSQ	8	8	5	9^{F}	Ret	11	4	15	3	187
7	(Netherlands) Collin Veijer	Husqvarna	Liqui Moly Husqvarna Intact GP	12	22	13	23	15	6	Ret	7	9^{F}	4^{P}	DNS	5	Ret	11	4	4	3	1	10	4^{P}	149
8	(Brazil) Diogo Moreira	KTM	MT Helmets – MSi	3	2	4	10	Ret	7	7	12	7	8	16	12	13	14	1^{P}	Ret	13	Ret	26	Ret	131
9	(Spain) José Antonio Rueda	KTM	Red Bull KTM Ajo	4	23	10	5	9	14	13	6	8	11	3	9	10	10	5	18	16	Ret	16	6	121
10	(Spain) David Muñoz	KTM	Boé Motorsports	2	16	Ret	DNS			12	5^{P}	5	9	Ret	4	6	6	3	Ret	Ret	17	12	9	113
11	(Japan) Kaito Toba	Honda	Sic58 Squadra Corse	11	7	11	Ret	12	10	14	11	14	14	7	6	2	8	12	17	10	Ret	8	20	105
12	(Italy) Stefano Nepa	KTM	Angeluss MTA Team	7	6	Ret	15	10	9	9	10	12	10	5	13	9	4	10	12	17	15	18	15	102
13	(Japan) Ryusei Yamanaka	GasGas	GasGas Aspar Team	16	9	9	25^{F}	5	15	8	15	15	7	9	14	15	9	15	15	9	9	21	10	84
14	(Italy) Riccardo Rossi	Honda	Sic58 Squadra Corse	15	Ret	15	Ret	16	8	17	18	13	6	6	18	7	13	13	6	8	Ret	4	17	79
15	(Spain) Xavier Artigas	CFMoto	CFMoto Racing Prüstel GP	8	8	3	7	7	Ret	11	14	21	19	12	17	12	Ret	19	16	14	6	20	19	77
16	(Japan) Taiyo Furusato	Honda	Honda Team Asia	20	18	20	16	Ret	Ret	10	17	20	18	13	11	Ret	12	7	7	2	Ret	14	11	63
17	(Australia) Joel Kelso	CFMoto	CFMoto Racing Prüstel GP	9			18	11	Ret	22	9	16	16	DSQ	19	Ret	15	16	3	12	7	13	7	61
18	(Italy) Matteo Bertelle	Honda	Rivacold Snipers Team	17	12	Ret	13	17	12	Ret	16	Ret	12	10	20	Ret	Ret	11	9	7	10	7	18	57
19	(Japan) Tatsuki Suzuki	Honda	Leopard Racing	14	1	Ret	8	13	Ret			Ret	13	8	15	Ret	Ret							50
20	(Italy) Romano Fenati	Honda	Rivacold Snipers Team	19	13	16	11	19	17	18	8	10	17	14	10	DNS					Ret	11	16	35
21	(Spain) David Salvador	KTM	CIP Green Power	13	10	7	Ret	14	18	24	20	6	15	19	Ret	Ret			Ret	25	18	23	21	31
22	(Spain) Adrián Fernández	Honda	Leopard Racing							16	Ret							Ret	5	15	5	17	14	25
23	(United Kingdom) Scott Ogden	Honda	VisionTrack Racing Team	Ret	5	14	12	Ret	13	20	22	17	22	15	23	Ret	18	Ret	DNQ	20	13	19	DNS	24
24	(Italy) Filippo Farioli	KTM	Red Bull KTM Tech3	Ret	20	18	14	18	Ret	21	21	19	21	Ret	21	11	16	20	Ret	19	8	Ret	12	19
25	(Italy) Andrea Migno	KTM	CIP Green Power		3	19	17	Ret	16	15	19													17
26	(Spain) Vicente Pérez	KTM	Boé Motorsports						Ret										Ret	18	12	5	Ret	15
27	(France) Lorenzo Fellon	KTM	CIP Green Power	DNS								24	24	23	24	17	21	23	10	21	16	24	Ret	6
28	(Malaysia) Syarifuddin Azman	KTM	MT Helmets – MSi	22	11	Ret	21	Ret	DNS		DNS	Ret	28	24	25	21	19	24	Ret	24	20	22	DNS	5
29	(Italy) Nicola Carraro	Honda	Rivacold Snipers Team															21	11	22				5
30	(United Kingdom) Joshua Whatley	Honda	VisionTrack Racing Team	21	15	DNS	24	22	21	23	Ret	25	27	21	22	16	20	22	14	23	14	Ret		5
31	(Indonesia) Mario Aji	Honda	Honda Team Asia	18	Ret	12	19	21	20	19	23	22	26	17	26	18	23	25	Ret	26	19	25	23	4
32	(Spain) David Almansa	CFMoto	CFMoto Racing Prüstel GP		17	17																		0
32	(Spain) David Almansa	Husqvarna	Finetwork Intact GP				20							22									WD	0
32	(Spain) David Almansa	Honda	Rivacold Snipers Team														17							0
33	(Indonesia) Fadillah Arbi Aditama	Honda	Honda Team Asia															17						0
34	(Thailand) Tatchakorn Buasri	Honda	Honda Team Asia							25			23	18						28				0
35	(Spain) Ana Carrasco	KTM	Boé Motorsports	23	21	21	22	20	22	27	24	23	25	25	27	19	22	Ret						0
36	(Italy) Luca Lunetta	KTM	MT Helmets – MSi						19															0
37	(Malaysia) Danial Shahril	KTM	MT Helmets – MSi							26														0
37	(Malaysia) Danial Shahril	Honda	Petronas MIE/MLav Racing Team													20								0
38	(Switzerland) Noah Dettwiler	CFMoto	CFMoto Racing Prüstel GP										20											0
38	(Switzerland) Noah Dettwiler	KTM	CIP Green Power															26						0
39	(Spain) Marcos Ruda	Husqvarna	Finetwork Intact GP																				22	0
40	(Thailand) Krittapat Keankum	KTM	Yamaha Thailand Racing - BOE																	27				0
	(India) KY Ahamed	Honda	Petronas MIE/MLav Racing Team													DNQ								0
Pos.	Rider	Bike	Team	POR (Portugal)	ARG (Argentina)	AME (United States)	SPA (Spain)	FRA (France)	ITA (Italy)	GER (Germany)	NED (Netherlands)	GBR (United Kingdom)	AUT (Austria)	CAT (Catalonia)	RSM (San Marino)	IND (India)	JPN (Japan)	INA (Indonesia)	AUS (Australia)	THA (Thailand)	MAL (Malaysia)	QAT (Qatar)	VAL (Valencian Community)	Pts

Race key
Colour	Result
Gold	Winner
Silver	2nd place
Bronze	3rd place
Green	Points finish
Blue	Non-points finish
Blue	Non-classified finish (NC)
Purple	Retired (Ret)
Red	Did not qualify (DNQ)
Black	Disqualified (DSQ)
White	Did not start (DNS)
White	Withdrew (WD)
White	Race cancelled (C)
Blank	Did not practice (DNP)
Blank	Excluded (EX)
Blank	Did not arrive (DNA)
Blank	Did not enter (empty cell)
Annotation	Meaning
P	Pole position
F	Fastest lap
Rider key
Colour	Meaning
Light blue	Rookie rider

=== Constructors' standings ===
Each constructor was awarded the same number of points as their best placed rider in each race.

Pos.	Constructor	POR (Portugal)	ARG (Argentina)	AME (United States)	SPA (Spain)	FRA (France)	ITA (Italy)	GER (Germany)	NED (Netherlands)	GBR (United Kingdom)	AUT (Austria)	CAT (Catalonia)	RSM (San Marino)	IND (India)	JPN (Japan)	INA (Indonesia)	AUS (Australia)	THA (Thailand)	MAL (Malaysia)	QAT (Qatar)	VAL (Valencian Community)	Pts
1	(Austria) KTM	1	2	1	1	1	1	1	3	3	1	3	3	4	3	1	1	5	4	3	3	394
2	(Japan) Honda	5	1	2	3	3	5	6	1	10	6	2	2	1	1	6	5	2	3	1	11	327
3	(Sweden) Husqvarna	6	22	13	4	2	3	2	2	2	3	4	5	3	2	4	2	3	1	6	1	307
4	(Spain) GasGas	16	9	8	2	5	4	5	13	1	7	1	1	5	7	2	15	1	9	2	2	270
5	(China) CFMoto	8	8	3	7	7	Ret	11	9	16	16	12	17	12	15	16	3	12	6	13	7	113
Pos.	Constructor	POR (Portugal)	ARG (Argentina)	AME (United States)	SPA (Spain)	FRA (France)	ITA (Italy)	GER (Germany)	NED (Netherlands)	GBR (United Kingdom)	AUT (Austria)	CAT (Catalonia)	RSM (San Marino)	IND (India)	JPN (Japan)	INA (Indonesia)	AUS (Australia)	THA (Thailand)	MAL (Malaysia)	QAT (Qatar)	VAL (Valencian Community)	Pts

=== Teams' standings ===
The teams' standings were based on results obtained by regular and substitute riders; wild-card entries were ineligible.

Pos.	Team	Bike No.	POR (Portugal)	ARG (Argentina)	AME (United States)	SPA (Spain)	FRA (France)	ITA (Italy)	GER (Germany)	NED (Netherlands)	GBR (United Kingdom)	AUT (Austria)	CAT (Catalonia)	RSM (San Marino)	IND (India)	JPN (Japan)	INA (Indonesia)	AUS (Australia)	THA (Thailand)	MAL (Malaysia)	QAT (Qatar)	VAL (Valencian Community)	Pts
1	(Germany) Liqui Moly Husqvarna Intact GP	71	6^{P}	Ret^{P}	Ret	4	2^{P F}	3^{F}	2^{P}	2	2	3	4	7	3^{F}	2^{F}	18	2^{P}	Ret	2^{F}	6^{F}	1	417
1	(Germany) Liqui Moly Husqvarna Intact GP	95	12	22	13	23	15	6	Ret	7	9^{F}	4^{P}	DNS	5	Ret	11	4	4	3	1	10	4^{P}	417
2	(Luxembourg) Leopard Racing	5	5	Ret^{F}	2^{P}	3	3	5	6	1	18^{P}	Ret	2	2^{P}	1^{P}	1^{P}	6	8	4	3^{P}	1	13	349
2	(Luxembourg) Leopard Racing	24	14	1	Ret	8	13	Ret			Ret	13	8	15	Ret	Ret							349
2	(Luxembourg) Leopard Racing	31							16	Ret							Ret	5	15	5	17	14	349
3	(Finland) Red Bull KTM Ajo	53	10^{F}	24	6	9^{P}	6	2^{P}	1	3	11	1	11^{P}	3	14	Ret	8	1^{F}	5^{P F}	11	3	5	344
3	(Finland) Red Bull KTM Ajo	99	4	23	10	5	9	14	13	6	8	11	3	9	10	10	5	18	16	Ret	16	6	344
4	(Spain) GasGas Aspar Team	6	16	9	9	25^{F}	5	15	8	15	15	7	9	14	15	9	15	15	9	9	21	10	329
4	(Spain) GasGas Aspar Team	80	Ret	14	8	2	8	4	5	13	1	29^{F}	1	1^{F}	5	7	2	Ret	1	Ret	2	2^{F}	329
5	(Italy) Angeluss MTA Team	48	Ret	19	1^{F}	1	4	11	4	4^{F}	4	5	DSQ	8	8	5	9^{F}	Ret	11	4	15	3	289
5	(Italy) Angeluss MTA Team	82	7	6	Ret	15	10	9	9	10	12	10	5	13	9	4	10	12	17	15	18	15	289
6	(France) Red Bull KTM Tech3	7	Ret	20	18	14	18	Ret	21	21	19	21	Ret	21	11	16	20	Ret	19	8	Ret	12	239
6	(France) Red Bull KTM Tech3	96	1	4	5	6	1	1	3^{F}	25	3	2	20^{F}	16	4	3	14	13	6	Ret	9^{P}	8	239
7	(Italy) Sic58 Squadra Corse	27	11	7	11	Ret	12	10	14	11	14	14	7	6	2	8	12	17	10	Ret	8	20	184
7	(Italy) Sic58 Squadra Corse	54	15	Ret	15	Ret	16	8	17	18	13	6	6	18	7	13	13	6	8	Ret	4	17	184
8	(Germany) CFMoto Racing Prüstel GP	43	8	8	3	7	7	Ret	11	14	21	19	12	17	12	Ret	19	16	14	6	20	20	138
8	(Germany) CFMoto Racing Prüstel GP	66	9			18	11	Ret	22	9	16	16	DSQ	19	Ret	15	16	3	12	7	13	7	138
8	(Germany) CFMoto Racing Prüstel GP	92		17	17																		138
9	(Spain) MT Helmets – MSi	10	3	2	4	10	Ret	7	7	12	7	8	16	12	13	14	1^{P}	Ret	13	Ret	26	Ret	136
9	(Spain) MT Helmets – MSi	57							26														136
9	(Spain) MT Helmets – MSi	63	22	11	Ret	21	Ret	DNS		DNS	Ret	28	24	25	21	19	24	Ret	24	20	22	DNS	136
10	(Spain) Boé Motorsports	21						Ret										Ret	18	12	5	Ret	128
10	(Spain) Boé Motorsports	22	23	21	21	22	20	22	27	24	23	25	25	27	19	22	Ret						128
10	(Spain) Boé Motorsports	44	2	16	Ret	DNS			12	5^{P}	5	9	Ret	4	6	6	3	Ret	Ret	17	12	9	128
11	(Italy) Rivacold Snipers Team	9															21	11	22				97
11	(Italy) Rivacold Snipers Team	18	17	12	Ret	13	17	12	Ret	16	Ret	12	10	20	Ret	Ret	11	9	7	10	7	18	97
11	(Italy) Rivacold Snipers Team	55	19	13	16	11	19	17	18	8	10	17	14	10	DNS					Ret	11	16	97
11	(Italy) Rivacold Snipers Team	92														17							97
12	(Japan) Honda Team Asia	64	18	Ret	12	19	21	20	19	23	22	26	17	26	18	23	25	Ret	26	19	25	23	67
12	(Japan) Honda Team Asia	72	20	18	20	16	Ret	Ret	10	17	20	18	13	11	Ret	12	7	7	2	Ret	14	11	67
13	(France) CIP Green Power	12															26						54
13	(France) CIP Green Power	16		3	19	17	Ret	16	15	19													54
13	(France) CIP Green Power	20	DNS								24	24	23	24	17	21	23	10	21	16	24	Ret	54
13	(France) CIP Green Power	38	13	10	7	Ret	14	18	24	20	6	15	19	Ret	Ret			Ret	25	18	23	21	54
14	(United Kingdom) VisionTrack Racing Team	19	Ret	5	14	12	Ret	13	20	22	17	22	15	23	Ret	18	Ret	DNQ	20	13	19	DNS	29
14	(United Kingdom) VisionTrack Racing Team	70	21	15	DNS	24	22	21	23	Ret	25	27	21	22	16	20	22	14	23	14	Ret		29
Pos.	Team	Bike No.	POR (Portugal)	ARG (Argentina)	AME (United States)	SPA (Spain)	FRA (France)	ITA (Italy)	GER (Germany)	NED (Netherlands)	GBR (United Kingdom)	AUT (Austria)	CAT (Catalonia)	RSM (San Marino)	IND (India)	JPN (Japan)	INA (Indonesia)	AUS (Australia)	THA (Thailand)	MAL (Malaysia)	QAT (Qatar)	VAL (Valencian Community)	Pts
