= 2023 Moto2 World Championship =

14th running of the Moto2 World Championship

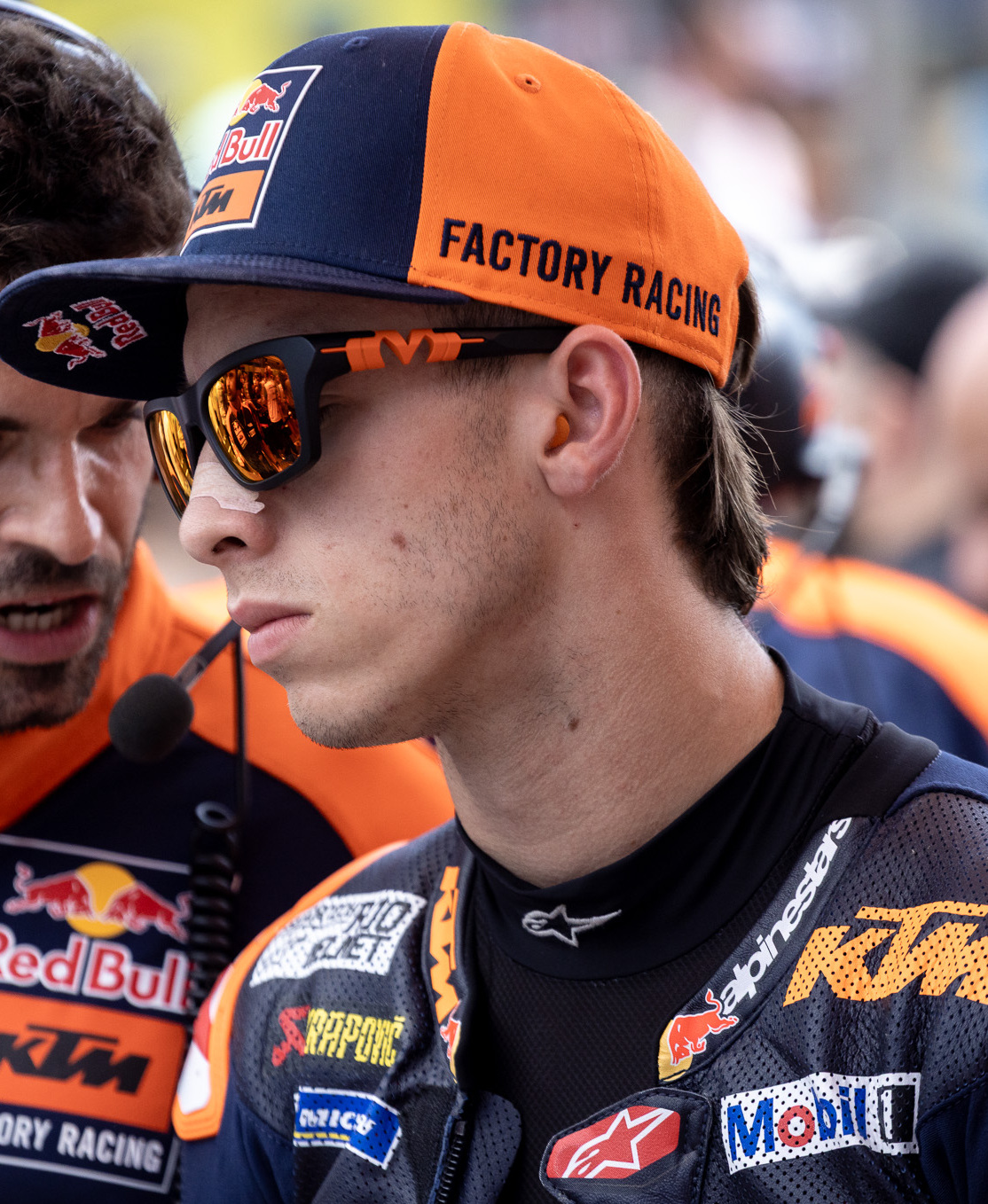
Pedro Acosta (pictured in 2025) was the 2023 Moto2 World Riders' Champion.

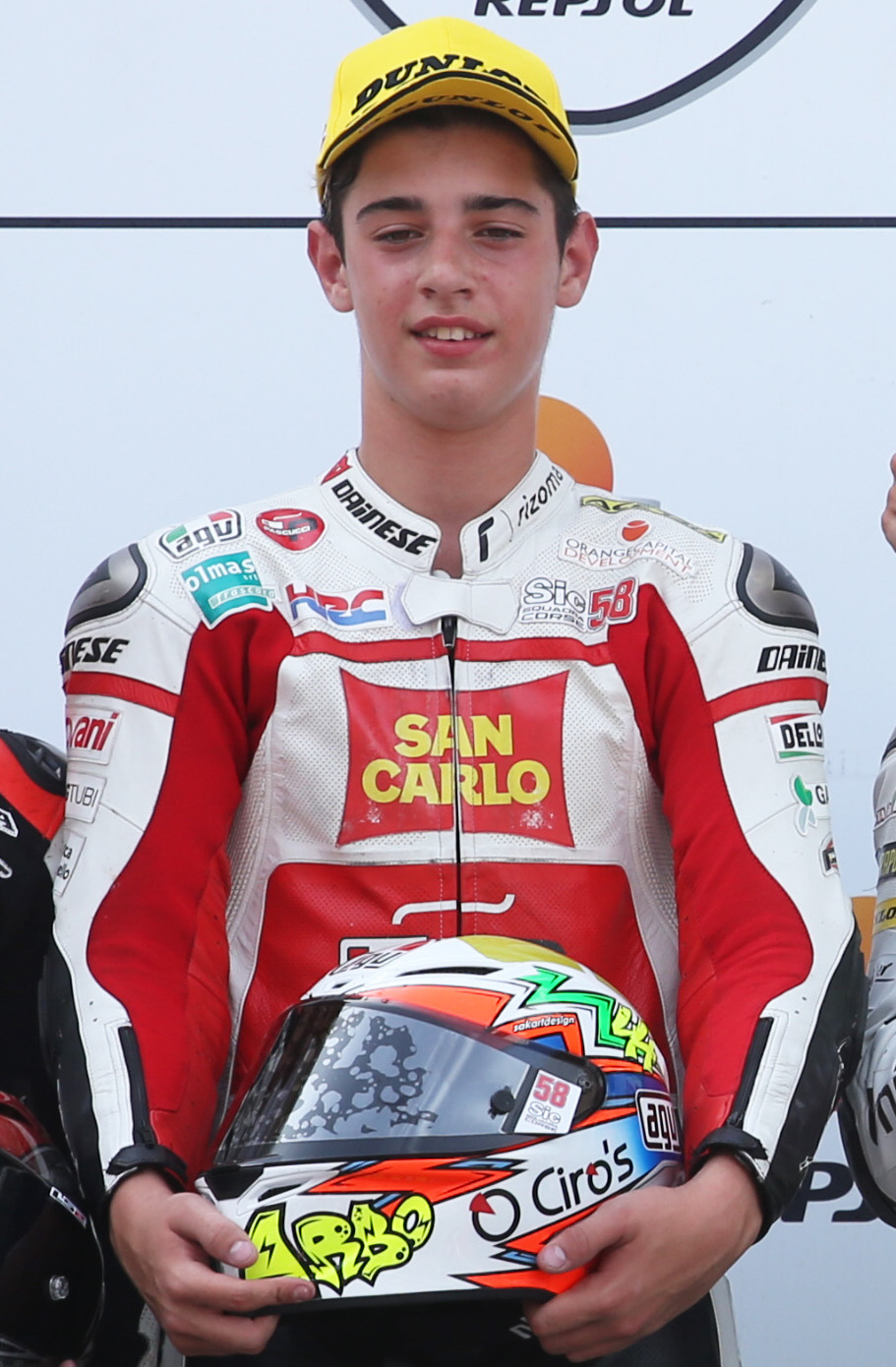
Tony Arbolino (pictured in 2016) finished runner-up.

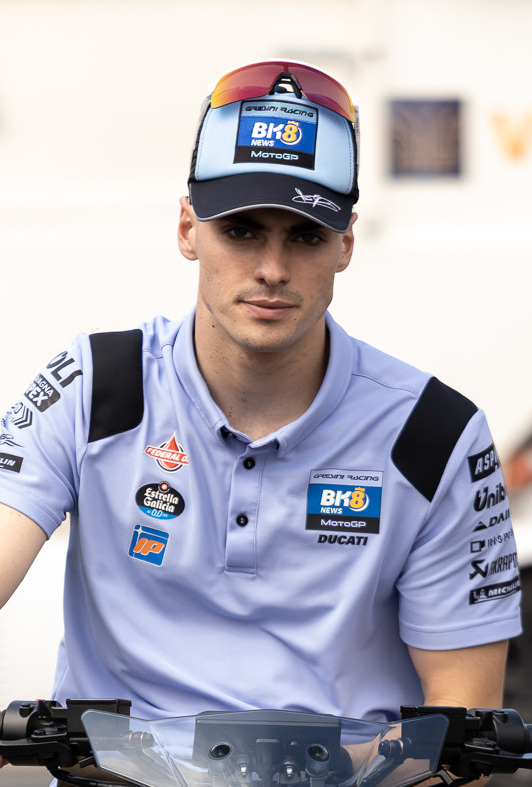
Fermín Aldeguer (pictured in 2025) finished third.

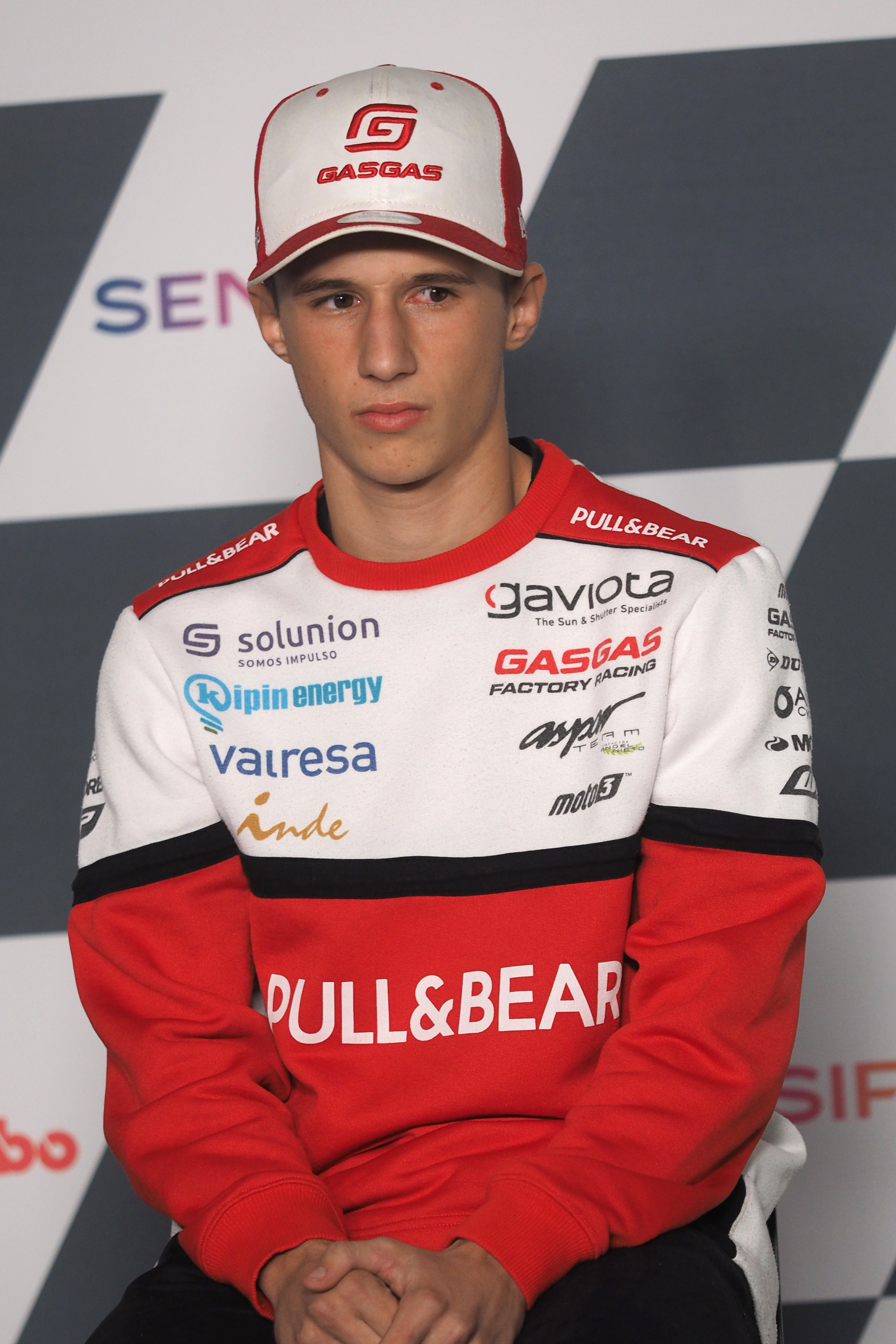
Sergio García (pictured in 2021), the 2023 Moto2 Rookie of the Year.

The 2023 FIM Moto2 World Championship was the intermediate class of the 75th Fédération Internationale de Motocyclisme (FIM) Road Racing World Championship season. Pedro Acosta won the championship with two races to spare after finishing second at the Malaysian round in Sepang, riding for Red Bull KTM Ajo.

== Teams and riders ==
Team	Constructor	Motorcycle	No.	Rider	Rounds
(Italy) Speed Up Racing (Note: This is the team name entered in the championship. Other team names used during the season are CAG Speed Up (rounds 1, 4, 10, 20), Beta Tools Speed Up (rounds 2–3, 8–9, 11, 14–19), Lightech Speed Up (round 5), MB Conveyors Speed Up (rounds 6–7), +Ego Speed Up (round 12), and GT Trevisan Speed Up (round 13).)	Boscoscuro	B-23	21	(Spain) Alonso López	All
(Italy) Speed Up Racing	Boscoscuro	B-23	54	(Spain) Fermín Aldeguer	All
(Switzerland) Forward Team	Forward	F2	17	(Spain) Álex Escrig	1, 4–5, 9–10, 15–20 (Note: Álex Escrig was entered for the first Friday practice session during round 1, before being replaced by David Sanchís due to injury.)
(Switzerland) Forward Team	Forward	F2	98	(Spain) David Sanchís	1–3
(Switzerland) Forward Team	Forward	F2	19	(Italy) Lorenzo Dalla Porta	6–7
(Switzerland) Forward Team	Forward	F2	55	(Spain) Yeray Ruiz	8, 11
(Switzerland) Forward Team	Forward	F2	4	(United States) Sean Dylan Kelly	12–14
(Switzerland) Forward Team	Forward	F2	24	(Spain) Marcos Ramírez	1–9 (Note: Marcos Ramírez was entered for the first Friday practice session during round 8, before being replaced by Álex Escrig due to injury.)
(Switzerland) Forward Team	Forward	F2	17	(Spain) Álex Escrig	8
(Switzerland) Forward Team	Forward	F2	67	(Italy) Alberto Surra	10–17
(Switzerland) Forward Team	Forward	F2	4	(United States) Sean Dylan Kelly	18
(Switzerland) Forward Team	Forward	F2	4	(United States) Sean Dylan Kelly	19–20
(United States) American Racing (Note: From round 6 onwards, the team used the team name OnlyFans American Racing.)	Kalex	Moto2	4	(United States) Sean Dylan Kelly	1–8
(United States) American Racing	Kalex	Moto2	24	(Spain) Marcos Ramírez	10
(United States) American Racing	Kalex	Moto2	24	(Spain) Marcos Ramírez	11–20
(United States) American Racing	Kalex	Moto2	33	(United Kingdom) Rory Skinner	1–6, 9–20
(United States) American Racing	Kalex	Moto2	99	(Spain) Carlos Tatay	7–8
(Italy) Correos Prepago Yamaha VR46 Team (Note: From rounds 1–13, the team used the team name Correos Prepago Yamaha VR46 Master Camp.)	Kalex	Moto2	5	(Japan) Kohta Nozane	1, 9–20
(Italy) Correos Prepago Yamaha VR46 Team	Kalex	Moto2	2	(Japan) Soichiro Minamimoto	2–4
(Italy) Correos Prepago Yamaha VR46 Team	Kalex	Moto2	27	(Malaysia) Kasma Daniel	6–7
(Italy) Correos Prepago Yamaha VR46 Team	Kalex	Moto2	18	(Spain) Manuel González	All
(Belgium) Elf Marc VDS Racing Team	Kalex	Moto2	14	(Italy) Tony Arbolino	All
(Belgium) Elf Marc VDS Racing Team	Kalex	Moto2	22	(United Kingdom) Sam Lowes	All
(Italy) Fantic Racing	Kalex	Moto2	13	(Italy) Celestino Vietti	1–13, 16–20
(Italy) Fantic Racing	Kalex	Moto2	72	(Spain) Borja Gómez	14
(Italy) Fantic Racing	Kalex	Moto2	43	(Italy) Lorenzo Baldassarri	15
(Italy) Fantic Racing	Kalex	Moto2	72	(Spain) Borja Gómez	1–13
(Italy) Fantic Racing	Kalex	Moto2	9	(Italy) Mattia Casadei	14–20
(Netherlands) Fieten Olie Racing GP	Kalex	Moto2	7	(Belgium) Barry Baltus	All
(Netherlands) Fieten Olie Racing GP	Kalex	Moto2	84	(Netherlands) Zonta van den Goorbergh	All
(Netherlands) Fieten Olie Racing GP	Kalex	Moto2	34	(Italy) Mattia Pasini	6, 12
(Malaysia) Petronas MIE Racing RW	Kalex	Moto2	20	(Malaysia) Azroy Hakeem Anuar	18
(Malaysia) Petronas MIE Racing RW	Kalex	Moto2	32	(Malaysia) Helmi Azman	18
(Spain) GasGas Aspar Team (Note: This is the team name entered in the championship. Other team names used during the season are Inde GasGas Aspar M2 (rounds 1, 5), Solunion GasGas Aspar Team (round 2), Asterius GasGas Aspar M2 (round 3), AutoSolar GasGas Aspar M2 (rounds 4, 6), Polar Cube GasGas Aspar Team (round 7), Inde GasGas Aspar Team (rounds 8, 12–20), Tensite GasGas Aspar Team (round 9), AutoSolar GasGas Aspar Team (round 10), and Asterius GasGas Aspar Team (round 11).)	Kalex	Moto2	28	(Spain) Izan Guevara	3–20
(Spain) GasGas Aspar Team	Kalex	Moto2	81	(Spain) Jordi Torres	1–2
(Spain) GasGas Aspar Team	Kalex	Moto2	96	(United Kingdom) Jake Dixon	All
(Japan) Idemitsu Honda Team Asia	Kalex	Moto2	35	(Thailand) Somkiat Chantra	All
(Japan) Idemitsu Honda Team Asia	Kalex	Moto2	79	(Japan) Ai Ogura	2–20
(Italy) Italtrans Racing Team	Kalex	Moto2	16	(United States) Joe Roberts	All
(Italy) Italtrans Racing Team	Kalex	Moto2	71	(Italy) Dennis Foggia	All
(Germany) Liqui Moly Husqvarna Intact GP	Kalex	Moto2	3	(Germany) Lukas Tulovic	1, 3–13, 15–20
(Germany) Liqui Moly Husqvarna Intact GP	Kalex	Moto2	8	(Australia) Senna Agius	14
(Germany) Liqui Moly Husqvarna Intact GP	Kalex	Moto2	15	(South Africa) Darryn Binder	1–3, 6–10, 13–20
(Germany) Liqui Moly Husqvarna Intact GP	Kalex	Moto2	8	(Australia) Senna Agius	4–5, 11–12
(Indonesia) Pertamina Mandalika SAG Team	Kalex	Moto2	19	(Italy) Lorenzo Dalla Porta	1–5
(Indonesia) Pertamina Mandalika SAG Team	Kalex	Moto2	23	(Japan) Taiga Hada	6–9, 12–20
(Indonesia) Pertamina Mandalika SAG Team	Kalex	Moto2	73	(Italy) Mattia Rato	10–11
(Indonesia) Pertamina Mandalika SAG Team	Kalex	Moto2	64	(Netherlands) Bo Bendsneyder	All
(Spain) Pons Wegow Los40	Kalex	Moto2	11	(Spain) Sergio García	All
(Spain) Pons Wegow Los40	Kalex	Moto2	40	(Spain) Arón Canet	All
(Italy) QJmotor Gresini Moto2	Kalex	Moto2	12	(Czech Republic) Filip Salač	All
(Italy) QJmotor Gresini Moto2	Kalex	Moto2	52	(Spain) Jeremy Alcoba	All
(Italy) QJmotor Gresini Moto2	Kalex	Moto2	44	(Italy) Matteo Ferrari	20
(Finland) Red Bull KTM Ajo	Kalex	Moto2	37	(Spain) Pedro Acosta	All
(Finland) Red Bull KTM Ajo	Kalex	Moto2	75	(Spain) Albert Arenas	All
(Netherlands) Fieten Olie Racing GP	NTS	NH7	45	(Spain) Héctor Garzó	20

Key
Regular rider
Replacement rider
Wildcard rider

All teams used series-specified Dunlop tyres and Triumph 765cc 3-cylinder engines.

=== Team changes ===
- Forward Racing and MV Agusta ended their partnership which started in 2019. Forward Racing entered the 2023 season using motorcycles under their own brand.

=== Rider changes ===
- Dennis Foggia made his Moto2 debut with Italtrans Racing Team, replacing Lorenzo Dalla Porta.
- Cameron Beaubier returned to the AMA Superbike Championship after two years in Moto2. Rory Skinner replaced Beaubier at American Racing to make his full-time Moto2 debut, having appeared as a wildcard rider for the team in 2022. Skinner raced in the British Superbike Championship in 2022.
- Sergio García made his Moto2 debut with Pons Wegow Los40, replacing Jorge Navarro. Navarro then left Moto2 for the Supersport World Championship.
- Álex Escrig made his Moto2 debut with Forward Team, replacing Simone Corsi who became the rider coach for the team. Escrig raced in both the MotoE World Cup and Moto2 European Championship in 2022.
- Lorenzo Dalla Porta moved to Pertamina Mandalika SAG Team from Italtrans Racing Team, replacing the now-retired Gabriel Rodrigo.
- Albert Arenas moved to Red Bull KTM Ajo from GasGas Aspar Team, replacing Augusto Fernández who moved up to MotoGP. 2022 Moto3 World Riders' Champion Izan Guevara then moved up from Moto3 while remaining with GasGas Aspar Team, replacing Arenas.
- Kohta Nozane made his full-time debut with Correos Prepago Yamaha VR46 Master Camp, replacing Keminth Kubo. Nozane has raced before as a replacement rider in the Moto2 and MotoGP classes. Nozane raced in the Superbike World Championship in 2022.
- Darryn Binder and Lukas Tulovic raced for Liqui Moly Husqvarna Intact GP, replacing Jeremy Alcoba and Marcel Schrötter. Alcoba moved to QJmotor Gresini Moto2, replacing Alessandro Zaccone, while Schrötter left Moto2 for the Supersport World Championship. Binder made his Moto2 debut, having raced in MotoGP in 2022. Tulovic, who is the 2022 Moto2 European Champion, returned to the Moto2 class, having last raced in 2019. Tulovic also raced as a replacement rider in MotoE in 2022.
- Borja Gómez made his full-time debut with Fantic Racing, replacing Niccolò Antonelli who was previously announced to race with the team in 2023, and was also included in the released provisional entry list. Gómez has served as a replacement rider in 2022.

==== Mid-season changes ====
- Izan Guevara missed the first two rounds of the season due to a triangular fibrocartilage injury in his right wrist sustained during testing at Portimão. He was replaced by Jordi Torres.
- Ai Ogura missed the Portuguese round after undergoing surgery on his left wrist that was injured during a training accident. He was not replaced.
- Álex Escrig competed during P1 of the Portuguese round, but withdrew after being declared unfit due to the effects of a right shoulder injury sustained during pre-season testing. He was replaced by David Sanchis for the rest of the weekend, and also at the Argentine and Americas rounds. Escrig also missed the Italian, German, and Dutch rounds to continue his recovery. He was replaced by Lorenzo Dalla Porta for the Italian and German round, and by Yeray Ruiz for the Dutch round. Dalla Porta raced for Pertamina Mandalika SAG Team from the start of the season but parted ways with the team after the French round. He was replaced by Taiga Hada starting from the Italian round. Escrig also missed the Catalan, San Marino, Indian, and Japanese rounds after sustaining a fractured tibia during P3 of the previous Austrian round. He was again replaced by Ruiz for the Catalan round, and by Sean Dylan Kelly for the San Marino, Indian, and Japanese rounds. Kelly raced for American Racing from the start of the season but parted ways with the team after the Austrian round. He was replaced by Marcos Ramírez starting from the Catalan round.
- Kohta Nozane missed seven Grands Prix due to a lower back injury sustained at the Portuguese round. He was replaced by Soichiro Minamimoto for the Argentine, Americas, and Spanish rounds, by Kasma Daniel for the Italian and German rounds, and was not replaced for the French and Dutch rounds.
- Lukas Tulovic missed the Argentine round due to a previous injury which also caused him to withdraw from the previous Portuguese round. He was not replaced. He also missed the Japanese round due to a broken collarbone. He was replaced by Senna Agius.
- Darryn Binder missed the Spanish and French rounds after suffering a double fracture of his right hand during P3 of the Americas round. He was replaced for both races by Senna Agius. Binder also missed the Catalan and San Marino rounds due to a fractured vertebrae sustained in a crash during the previous Austrian race. He was again replaced for both races by Agius.
- Rory Skinner missed the German and Dutch rounds after suffering a fractured right foot during P3 of the Italian round. He was replaced for both races by Carlos Tatay.
- Marcos Ramírez competed during P1 of the Dutch round, but withdrew after suffering a small fracture in his right elbow during the session. He was replaced for the rest of the weekend by Álex Escrig. Escrig is a regular rider and Ramírez's teammate. He was initially declared unfit for the Dutch round and was replaced by Yeray Ruiz. Eventually, Escrig was declared fit enough to serve as a replacement rider for Ramírez.
- Sean Dylan Kelly missed the British and Austrian rounds to continue his recovery from forearm surgery after being plagued with arm pump issues. He was not replaced for the British round, and was replaced by Marcos Ramírez for the Austrian round. Ramírez raced for Forward Team from the start of the season but parted ways with the team after the British round. He was replaced by Alberto Surra starting from the Austrian round. Kelly parted ways with the team after the Austrian round. He was replaced by Ramírez as a full-time rider starting from the Catalan round.
- Taiga Hada missed the Austrian and Catalan rounds due to injury. He was replaced for both races by Mattia Rato.
- Celestino Vietti missed the Japanese and Indonesian rounds due to a fractured pubic bone sustained in the Indian race. He was replaced by Borja Gómez for the Japanese round, and by Lorenzo Baldassarri for the Indonesian round. Gómez raced for Fantic Racing from the start of the season as a regular rider and was Vietti's teammate but parted ways with the team after the Indian round. He was replaced by Mattia Casadei as a full-time rider starting from the Japanese round.
- Alberto Surra missed the Malaysian round due to injury. He was replaced by Sean Dylan Kelly. Surra parted ways with the team after the Malaysian round. He was replaced by Kelly as a full-time rider starting from the Qatar round.

== Regulation changes ==
The minimum age to have a license for Moto2 was raised to 18 years old.

== Calendar ==
The following Grands Prix took place in 2023:

Round	Date	Grand Prix	Circuit
1	26 March	Grande Prémio Tissot de Portugal	Algarve International Circuit, Portimão
2	2 April	Gran Premio Michelin de la República Argentina	Autódromo Termas de Río Hondo, Termas de Río Hondo
3	16 April	(United States) Red Bull Grand Prix of the Americas	Circuit of the Americas, Austin
4	30 April	(Spain) Gran Premio MotoGP Guru by Gryfyn de España	Circuito de Jerez, Jerez de la Frontera
5	14 May	Shark Grand Prix de France	Bugatti Circuit, Le Mans
6	11 June	(Italy) Gran Premio d'Italia Oakley	Mugello Circuit, Scarperia e San Piero
7	18 June	(Germany) Liqui Moly Motorrad Grand Prix Deutschland	Sachsenring, Hohenstein-Ernstthal
8	25 June	(Netherlands) Motul TT Assen	TT Circuit Assen, Assen
9	6 August	(United Kingdom) Monster Energy British Grand Prix	Silverstone Circuit, Silverstone
10	20 August	(Austria) CryptoData Motorrad Grand Prix von Österreich	Red Bull Ring, Spielberg
11	3 September	(Catalonia) Gran Premi Monster Energy de Catalunya	Circuit de Barcelona-Catalunya, Montmeló
12	10 September	Gran Premio Red Bull di San Marino e della Riviera di Rimini	Misano World Circuit, Misano Adriatico
13	24 September	IndianOil Grand Prix of India	Buddh International Circuit, Greater Noida
14	1 October	Motul Grand Prix of Japan	Motegi Circuit, Motegi
15	15 October	Pertamina Grand Prix of Indonesia	Mandalika International Street Circuit, Mandalika
16	22 October	(Australia) MotoGP Guru by Gryfyn Australian Motorcycle Grand Prix	Phillip Island Grand Prix Circuit, Phillip Island
17	29 October	OR Thailand Grand Prix	Buriram International Circuit, Buriram
18	12 November	Petronas Grand Prix of Malaysia	Sepang International Circuit, Sepang
19	19 November (Note: Night race)	Qatar Airways Grand Prix of Qatar	Lusail International Circuit, Lusail
20	26 November	(Valencian Community) Gran Premio Motul de la Comunitat Valenciana	Circuit Ricardo Tormo, Valencia
Cancelled Grand Prix
–	~~9 July~~	Kazakhstan motorcycle Grand Prix	Sokol International Racetrack, Almaty

=== Grand Prix locations ===
Location of non-European Grands Prix in 2023.
(scheduled Grand Prix: cancelled Grand Prix)
Location of European Grands Prix in 2023.

=== Calendar changes ===
- For the first time since 2006, Lusail in Qatar did not host the opening round due to "extensive renovation and remodelling to the paddock area and circuit facilities".
- The British Grand Prix returned to the International Paddock of the Silverstone Circuit for the first time since 2012.
- India and Kazakhstan were both scheduled to host their first World Championship motorcycle Grands Prix in 2023 at the Buddh International Circuit and the Sokol International Racetrack, respectively.
- The Hungarian Grand Prix was scheduled to make its debut in 2023 but was postponed until at least 2024 due to the unstarted construction of the circuit.
- The Aragon Grand Prix was omitted from the schedule for the first time since its introduction in 2010.
- The Finnish Grand Prix at Kymi Ring was under contract to feature in 2023, but was not included in the provisional calendar due to safety concerns of the 2022 Russian invasion of Ukraine.
- The Kazakhstan Grand Prix at Sokol International Racetrack was cancelled due to ongoing homologation works at the circuit, paired with global operational challenges. The event was not replaced.

== Results and standings ==
=== Grands Prix ===
Round	Grand Prix	Pole position	Fastest lap	Winning rider	Winning team	Winning constructor	Report
1	(Portugal) Portuguese motorcycle Grand Prix	(Czech Republic) Filip Salač	(Spain) Pedro Acosta	(Spain) Pedro Acosta	(Finland) Red Bull KTM Ajo	(Germany) Kalex	Report
2	(Argentina) Argentine Republic motorcycle Grand Prix	(Spain) Alonso López	(Spain) Alonso López	(Italy) Tony Arbolino	(Belgium) Elf Marc VDS Racing Team	(Germany) Kalex	Report
3	(United States) Motorcycle Grand Prix of the Americas	(Italy) Celestino Vietti	(Spain) Jeremy Alcoba	(Spain) Pedro Acosta	(Finland) Red Bull KTM Ajo	(Germany) Kalex	Report
4	(Spain) Spanish motorcycle Grand Prix	(United Kingdom) Sam Lowes	(United Kingdom) Sam Lowes	(United Kingdom) Sam Lowes	(Belgium) Elf Marc VDS Racing Team	(Germany) Kalex	Report
5	(France) French motorcycle Grand Prix	(United Kingdom) Sam Lowes	(Spain) Pedro Acosta	(Italy) Tony Arbolino	(Belgium) Elf Marc VDS Racing Team	(Germany) Kalex	Report
6	(Italy) Italian motorcycle Grand Prix	(Spain) Arón Canet	(Spain) Pedro Acosta	(Spain) Pedro Acosta	(Finland) Red Bull KTM Ajo	(Germany) Kalex	Report
7	(Germany) German motorcycle Grand Prix	(Spain) Pedro Acosta	(Spain) Pedro Acosta	(Spain) Pedro Acosta	(Finland) Red Bull KTM Ajo	(Germany) Kalex	Report
8	(Netherlands) Dutch TT	(Spain) Alonso López	(United Kingdom) Jake Dixon	(United Kingdom) Jake Dixon	(Spain) Inde GasGas Aspar Team	(Germany) Kalex	Report
9	(United Kingdom) British motorcycle Grand Prix	(Spain) Pedro Acosta	(Spain) Fermín Aldeguer	(Spain) Fermín Aldeguer	(Italy) Beta Tools Speed Up	(Italy) Boscoscuro	Report
10	(Austria) Austrian motorcycle Grand Prix	(Spain) Pedro Acosta	(Spain) Pedro Acosta	(Italy) Celestino Vietti	(Italy) Fantic Racing	(Germany) Kalex	Report
11	(Catalonia) Catalan motorcycle Grand Prix	(United Kingdom) Jake Dixon	(Spain) Pedro Acosta	(United Kingdom) Jake Dixon	(Spain) Asterius GasGas Aspar Team	(Germany) Kalex	Report
12	San Marino and Rimini Riviera motorcycle Grand Prix	(Italy) Celestino Vietti	(Italy) Celestino Vietti	(Spain) Pedro Acosta	(Finland) Red Bull KTM Ajo	(Germany) Kalex	Report
13	(India) Indian motorcycle Grand Prix	(United Kingdom) Jake Dixon	(Spain) Pedro Acosta	(Spain) Pedro Acosta	(Finland) Red Bull KTM Ajo	(Germany) Kalex	Report
14	(Japan) Japanese motorcycle Grand Prix	(Thailand) Somkiat Chantra	(Thailand) Somkiat Chantra	(Thailand) Somkiat Chantra	(Japan) Idemitsu Honda Team Asia	(Germany) Kalex	Report
15	(Indonesia) Indonesian motorcycle Grand Prix	(Spain) Arón Canet	(Spain) Pedro Acosta	(Spain) Pedro Acosta	(Finland) Red Bull KTM Ajo	(Germany) Kalex	Report
16	(Australia) Australian motorcycle Grand Prix	(Spain) Fermín Aldeguer	(Italy) Tony Arbolino	(Italy) Tony Arbolino	(Belgium) Elf Marc VDS Racing Team	(Germany) Kalex	Report
17	Thailand motorcycle Grand Prix	(Spain) Fermín Aldeguer	(Spain) Fermín Aldeguer	(Spain) Fermín Aldeguer	(Italy) Beta Tools Speed Up	(Italy) Boscoscuro	Report
18	(Malaysia) Malaysian motorcycle Grand Prix	(Spain) Fermín Aldeguer	(Spain) Fermín Aldeguer	(Spain) Fermín Aldeguer	(Italy) Beta Tools Speed Up	(Italy) Boscoscuro	Report
19	Qatar motorcycle Grand Prix	(United States) Joe Roberts	(United Kingdom) Sam Lowes	(Spain) Fermín Aldeguer	(Italy) Beta Tools Speed Up	(Italy) Boscoscuro	Report
20	Valencian Community motorcycle Grand Prix	(Spain) Arón Canet	(Spain) Fermín Aldeguer	(Spain) Fermín Aldeguer	(Italy) CAG Speed Up	(Italy) Boscoscuro	Report

=== Riders' standings ===
Scoring system

Points were awarded to the top fifteen finishers. A rider had to finish the race to earn points.

Position	1st	2nd	3rd	4th	5th	6th	7th	8th	9th	10th	11th	12th	13th	14th	15th
Points	25	20	16	13	11	10	9	8	7	6	5	4	3	2	1

Pos.	Rider	Bike	Team	POR (Portugal)	ARG (Argentina)	AME (United States)	SPA (Spain)	FRA (France)	ITA (Italy)	GER (Germany)	NED (Netherlands)	GBR (United Kingdom)	AUT (Austria)	CAT (Catalonia)	RSM (San Marino)	IND (India)	JPN (Japan)	INA (Indonesia)	AUS‡ (Australia)	THA (Thailand)	MAL (Malaysia)	QAT (Qatar)	VAL (Valencian Community)	Pts
1	(Spain) Pedro Acosta	Kalex	Red Bull KTM Ajo	1^{F}	12	1	2	Ret^{F}	1^{F}	1^{P F}	3	3^{P}	2^{P F}	6^{F}	1	1^{F}	3	1^{F}	9	2	2	8	12	332.5
2	(Italy) Tony Arbolino	Kalex	Elf Marc VDS Racing Team	3	1	2	4	1	2	2	7	10	6	17	4	2	11	6	1^{F}	4	10	10	16	249.5
3	(Spain) Fermín Aldeguer	Boscoscuro	Speed Up Racing	13	15	6	10	8	Ret	8	4	1^{F}	9	13	Ret	12	22	3	3^{P}	1^{P F}	1^{P F}	1	1^{F}	212
4	(United Kingdom) Jake Dixon	Kalex	GasGas Aspar Team	6	3	DNS	6	5	3	3	1^{F}	Ret	4	1^{P}	12	Ret^{P}	4	4	Ret	Ret	5	5	6	204
5	(Spain) Arón Canet	Kalex	Pons Wegow Los40	2	4	8	5	DNS	4^{P}	Ret	5	2	Ret	2	Ret	Ret	8	2^{P}	2	11	Ret	3	2^{P}	195
6	(Thailand) Somkiat Chantra	Kalex	Idemitsu Honda Team Asia	9	8	11	7	6	9	4	Ret	9	5	14	6	Ret	1^{P F}	7	7	3	6	7	5	173.5
7	(Spain) Alonso López	Boscoscuro	Speed Up Racing	Ret	2^{P F}	7	3	3	6	5	6^{P}	Ret	21	8	3	22	13	25	NC	8	22	9	3	150
8	(Spain) Manuel González	Kalex	Correos Prepago Yamaha VR46 Team	5	11	10	12	DNS	8	6	8	5	Ret	5	7	5	6	5	13	10	Ret	2	13	145.5
9	(Japan) Ai Ogura	Kalex	Idemitsu Honda Team Asia		DNS	15	Ret	9	15	14	2	8	3	7	5	21	2	17	15	5	4	4	11	137.5
10	(Italy) Celestino Vietti	Kalex	Fantic Racing	11	13	9^{P}	Ret	4	5	10	10	12	1	10	2^{P F}	DNS			Ret	Ret	Ret	6	Ret	116
11	(Czech Republic) Filip Salač	Kalex	QJmotor Gresini Moto2	4^{P}	7	5	9	2	7	13	Ret	13	7	Ret	9	10	5	Ret	Ret	17	14	DNS	17	110
12	(United Kingdom) Sam Lowes	Kalex	Elf Marc VDS Racing Team	7	10	13	1^{P F}	15^{P}	Ret	7	11	7	Ret	9	Ret	19	Ret	10	Ret	14	7	12^{F}	7	104
13	(United States) Joe Roberts	Kalex	Italtrans Racing Team	14	14	16	14	12	12	Ret	18	4	Ret	11	8	3	12	9	5	Ret	8	11^{P}	8	93.5
14	(Spain) Albert Arenas	Kalex	Red Bull KTM Ajo	8	9	12	8	DNS	23	9	9	14	Ret	3	DNS	14	18	15	14	7	9	21	10	85
15	(Spain) Sergio García	Kalex	Pons Wegow Los40	15	5	Ret	11	10	10	11	13	Ret	8	4	11	4	Ret	8	Ret	Ret	25	16	Ret	84
16	(Spain) Marcos Ramírez	Forward	Forward Team	21	24	Ret	20	17	Ret	20	WD	19												65
16	(Spain) Marcos Ramírez	Kalex	American Racing										14	16	14	9	7	16	10	6	3	13	4	65
17	(Belgium) Barry Baltus	Kalex	Fieten Olie Racing GP	12	19	Ret	13	7	16	12	12	6	DNS	12	15	8	15	Ret	Ret	18	11	18	14	55
18	(Spain) Jeremy Alcoba	Kalex	QJmotor Gresini Moto2	10	17	4^{F}	16	13	Ret	16	15	11	12	15	16	Ret	16	20	4	13	12	15	15	48.5
19	(Italy) Dennis Foggia	Kalex	Italtrans Racing Team	18	25	14	18	14	13	15	19	Ret	11	21	Ret	11	Ret	11	17	12	15	17	9	35
20	(South Africa) Darryn Binder	Kalex	Liqui Moly Husqvarna Intact GP	16	6	DNS			Ret	Ret	14	15	Ret			7	10	13	Ret	15	DNS	14	20	34
21	(Netherlands) Bo Bendsneyder	Kalex	Pertamina Mandalika SAG Team	Ret	22	3	17	18	14	Ret	WD	17	15	Ret	13	18	17	12	8	16	17	22	24	30
22	(Spain) Izan Guevara	Kalex	GasGas Aspar Team			21	22	22	18	Ret	Ret	21	13	25	Ret	13	14	21	6	9	Ret	23	Ret	20
23	(Netherlands) Zonta van den Goorbergh	Kalex	Fieten Olie Racing GP	Ret	18	17	23	20	Ret	18	20	20	22	18	Ret	6	9	Ret	Ret	Ret	18	19	18	17
24	(Germany) Lukas Tulovic	Kalex	Liqui Moly Husqvarna Intact GP	DNS		Ret	15	11	Ret	Ret	16	16	10	19	Ret	DNS		22	20	23	24	Ret	Ret	12
25	(Italy) Mattia Pasini	Kalex	Fieten Olie Racing GP						11						10									11
26	(Japan) Taiga Hada	Kalex	Pertamina Mandalika SAG Team						21	21	21	Ret			19	23	19	14	11	Ret	16	25	22	4.5
27	(Spain) Álex Escrig	Forward	Forward Team	WD			DNS	Ret			Ret	18	DNS					18	19	19	13	20	23	3
28	(United Kingdom) Rory Skinner	Kalex	American Racing	22	Ret	19	24	Ret	DNS			Ret	18	23	Ret	20	25	19	12	20	20	24	21	2
29	(United States) Sean Dylan Kelly	Kalex	American Racing	20	Ret	18	Ret	16	19	17	Ret													1
29	(United States) Sean Dylan Kelly	Forward	Forward Team												20	15	23				19	Ret	26	1
30	(Spain) Borja Gómez	Kalex	Fantic Racing	17	21	20	19	23	17	DNS	Ret	Ret	16	20	18	16	24							0
31	(Japan) Kohta Nozane	Kalex	Correos Prepago Yamaha VR46 Team	DNS								22	20	24	21	Ret	Ret	Ret	16	22	Ret	Ret	Ret	0
32	(Spain) Jordi Torres	Kalex	GasGas Aspar Team	23	16																			0
33	(Italy) Alberto Surra	Forward	Forward Team										17	Ret	17	17	20	Ret	18	Ret				0
34	(Spain) Carlos Tatay	Kalex	American Racing							19	17													0
35	(Italy) Lorenzo Dalla Porta	Kalex	Pertamina Mandalika SAG Team	19	23	Ret	25	21																0
35	(Italy) Lorenzo Dalla Porta	Forward	Forward Team						20	Ret														0
36	(Australia) Senna Agius	Kalex	Liqui Moly Husqvarna Intact GP				21	19						Ret	Ret		21							0
37	(Italy) Mattia Rato	Kalex	Pertamina Mandalika SAG Team										19	22										0
38	(Italy) Matteo Ferrari	Kalex	QJmotor Gresini Moto2																				19	0
39	(Japan) Soichiro Minamimoto	Kalex	Correos Prepago Yamaha VR46 Master Camp		20	23	26																	0
40	(Italy) Mattia Casadei	Kalex	Fantic Racing														26	24	Ret	21	21	26	25	0
41	(Malaysia) Kasma Daniel	Kalex	Correos Prepago Yamaha VR46 Master Camp						22	22														0
42	(Spain) Yeray Ruiz	Forward	Forward Team								22			26										0
43	(Spain) David Sanchís	Forward	Forward Team	Ret	Ret	22																		0
44	(Malaysia) Helmi Azman	Kalex	Petronas MIE Racing RW																		23			0
45	(Italy) Lorenzo Baldassarri	Kalex	Fantic Racing															23						0
	(Malaysia) Azroy Hakeem Anuar	Kalex	Petronas MIE Racing RW																		Ret			0
	(Spain) Héctor Garzó	NTS	Fieten Olie Racing GP																				Ret	0
Pos.	Rider	Bike	Team	POR (Portugal)	ARG (Argentina)	AME (United States)	SPA (Spain)	FRA (France)	ITA (Italy)	GER (Germany)	NED (Netherlands)	GBR (United Kingdom)	AUT (Austria)	CAT (Catalonia)	RSM (San Marino)	IND (India)	JPN (Japan)	INA (Indonesia)	AUS‡ (Australia)	THA (Thailand)	MAL (Malaysia)	QAT (Qatar)	VAL (Valencian Community)	Pts

Race key
Colour	Result
Gold	Winner
Silver	2nd place
Bronze	3rd place
Green	Points finish
Blue	Non-points finish
Blue	Non-classified finish (NC)
Purple	Retired (Ret)
Red	Did not qualify (DNQ)
Black	Disqualified (DSQ)
White	Did not start (DNS)
White	Withdrew (WD)
White	Race cancelled (C)
Blank	Did not practice (DNP)
Blank	Excluded (EX)
Blank	Did not arrive (DNA)
Blank	Did not enter (empty cell)
Annotation	Meaning
P	Pole position
F	Fastest lap
Rider key
Colour	Meaning
Light blue	Rookie rider

- ‡ – Half points were awarded during the Australian Grand Prix as less than 50 percent of the scheduled race distance (but at least three full laps) was completed.

=== Constructors' standings ===
Each constructor was awarded the same number of points as their best placed rider in each race.

Pos.	Constructor	POR (Portugal)	ARG (Argentina)	AME (United States)	SPA (Spain)	FRA (France)	ITA (Italy)	GER (Germany)	NED (Netherlands)	GBR (United Kingdom)	AUT (Austria)	CAT (Catalonia)	RSM (San Marino)	IND (India)	JPN (Japan)	INA (Indonesia)	AUS‡ (Australia)	THA (Thailand)	MAL (Malaysia)	QAT (Qatar)	VAL (Valencian Community)	Pts
1	(Germany) Kalex	1	1	1	1	1	1	1	1	2	1	1	1	1	1	1	1	2	2	2	2	462.5
2	(Italy) Boscoscuro	13	2	6	3	3	6	5	4	1	9	8	3	12	13	3	3	1	1	1	1	286
3	(Switzerland) Forward	21	24	22	20	17	20	20	22	18	17	26	17	15	20	18	18	19	13	20	23	4
	(Japan) NTS																				Ret	0
Pos.	Constructor	POR (Portugal)	ARG (Argentina)	AME (United States)	SPA (Spain)	FRA (France)	ITA (Italy)	GER (Germany)	NED (Netherlands)	GBR (United Kingdom)	AUT (Austria)	CAT (Catalonia)	RSM (San Marino)	IND (India)	JPN (Japan)	INA (Indonesia)	AUS‡ (Australia)	THA (Thailand)	MAL (Malaysia)	QAT (Qatar)	VAL (Valencian Community)	Pts

- ‡ – Half points were awarded during the Australian Grand Prix as less than 50 percent of the scheduled race distance (but at least three full laps) was completed.

=== Teams' standings ===
The teams' standings were based on results obtained by regular and substitute riders; wild-card entries were ineligible.

Pos.	Team	Bike No.	POR (Portugal)	ARG (Argentina)	AME (United States)	SPA (Spain)	FRA (France)	ITA (Italy)	GER (Germany)	NED (Netherlands)	GBR (United Kingdom)	AUT (Austria)	CAT (Catalonia)	RSM (San Marino)	IND (India)	JPN (Japan)	INA (Indonesia)	AUS‡ (Australia)	THA (Thailand)	MAL (Malaysia)	QAT (Qatar)	VAL (Valencian Community)	Pts
1	(Finland) Red Bull KTM Ajo	37	1^{F}	12	1	2	Ret^{F}	1^{F}	1^{P F}	3	3^{P}	2^{P F}	6^{F}	1	1^{F}	3	1^{F}	9	2	2	8	12	417.5
1	(Finland) Red Bull KTM Ajo	75	8	9	12	8	DNS	23	9	9	14	Ret	3	DNS	14	18	15	14	7	9	21	10	417.5
2	(Italy) Speed Up Racing	21	Ret	2^{P F}	7	3	3	6	5	6^{P}	Ret	Ret	8	3	22	13	25	Ret	8	22	9	3	362
2	(Italy) Speed Up Racing	54	13	15	6	10	8	Ret	8	4	1^{F}	9	13	Ret	12	22	3	3^{P}	1^{P F}	1^{P F}	1	1^{F}	362
3	(Belgium) Elf Marc VDS Racing Team	14	3	1	2	4	1	2	2	7	10	10	17	4	2	11	6	1^{F}	4	10	10	16	353.5
3	(Belgium) Elf Marc VDS Racing Team	22	7	10	13	1^{P F}	15^{P}	Ret	7	11	7	Ret	9	Ret	19	Ret	10	Ret	14	7	12^{F}	7	353.5
4	(Japan) Idemitsu Honda Team Asia	35	9	8	11	7	6	9	4	Ret	9	5	14	6	Ret	1^{P F}	7	7	3	6	7	5	311
4	(Japan) Idemitsu Honda Team Asia	79		DNS	15	Ret	9	15	14	2	8	3	7	5	21	2	17	15	5	4	4	11	311
5	(Spain) Pons Wegow Los40	11	15	5	Ret	11	10	10	11	13	Ret	8	4	11	4	Ret	8	Ret	Ret	25	16	Ret	279
5	(Spain) Pons Wegow Los40	40	2	4	8	5	DNS	4^{P}	Ret	5	2	Ret	2	Ret	Ret	8	2^{P}	2	11	Ret	3	2^{P}	279
6	(Spain) GasGas Aspar Team	28			21	22	22	18	Ret	Ret	21	13	25	Ret	13	14	21	6	9	Ret	23	Ret	224
6	(Spain) GasGas Aspar Team	81	23	16																			224
6	(Spain) GasGas Aspar Team	96	6	3	DNS	6	5	3	3	1^{F}	Ret	4	1^{P}	12	Ret^{P}	4	4	Ret	Ret	5	5	6	224
7	(Italy) QJmotor Gresini Moto2	12	4^{P}	7	5	9	2	7	13	Ret	13	7	Ret	9	10	5	Ret	Ret	17	14	DNS	17	158.5
7	(Italy) QJmotor Gresini Moto2	52	10	17	4^{F}	16	13	Ret	16	15	11	12	15	16	Ret	16	20	4	13	12	15	15	158.5
8	(Italy) Correos Prepago Yamaha VR46 Team	2		20	23	26																	145.5
8	(Italy) Correos Prepago Yamaha VR46 Team	5	DNS								22	20	24	21	Ret	Ret	Ret	16	22	Ret	Ret	Ret	145.5
8	(Italy) Correos Prepago Yamaha VR46 Team	18	5	11	10	12	DNS	8	6	8	5	Ret	5	7	5	6	5	13	10	Ret	2	13	145.5
8	(Italy) Correos Prepago Yamaha VR46 Team	27						22	22														145.5
9	(Italy) Italtrans Racing Team	16	14	14	16	14	12	12	Ret	18	4	Ret	11	8	3	12	9	5	Ret	8	11^{P}	8	128.5
9	(Italy) Italtrans Racing Team	71	18	25	14	18	14	13	15	19	Ret	11	21	Ret	11	Ret	11	17	12	15	17	9	128.5
10	(Italy) Fantic Racing	9														26	24	Ret	21	21	26	25	116
10	(Italy) Fantic Racing	13	11	13	9^{P}	Ret	4	5	10	10	12	1	10	2^{P F}	DNS			Ret	Ret	Ret	6	Ret	116
10	(Italy) Fantic Racing	43															23						116
10	(Italy) Fantic Racing	72	17	21	20	19	23	17	DNS	Ret	Ret	16	20	18	16	24							116
11	(Netherlands) Fieten Olie Racing GP	7	12	19	Ret	13	7	16	12	12	6	DNS	12	15	8	15	Ret	Ret	18	11	18	14	72
11	(Netherlands) Fieten Olie Racing GP	84	Ret	18	17	23	20	Ret	18	20	20	21	18	Ret	6	9	Ret	Ret	Ret	18	19	18	72
12	(United States) American Racing	4	20	Ret	18	Ret	16	19	17	Ret													67
12	(United States) American Racing	24										14	16	14	9	7	16	10	6	3	13	4	67
12	(United States) American Racing	33	22	Ret	19	24	Ret	DNS			Ret	18	23	Ret	20	25	19	12	20	20	24	21	67
12	(United States) American Racing	99							19	17													67
13	(Germany) Liqui Moly Husqvarna Intact GP	3	DNS		Ret	15	11	Ret	Ret	16	16	10	19	Ret	DNS		22	20	23	24	Ret	Ret	46
13	(Germany) Liqui Moly Husqvarna Intact GP	8				21	19						Ret	Ret		21							46
13	(Germany) Liqui Moly Husqvarna Intact GP	15	16	6	DNS			Ret	Ret	14	15	Ret			7	10	13	Ret	15	DNS	14	20	46
14	(Indonesia) Pertamina Mandalika SAG Team	19	19	23	Ret	25	21																34.5
14	(Indonesia) Pertamina Mandalika SAG Team	23						21	21	21	Ret			19	23	19	14	11	Ret	16	25	22	34.5
14	(Indonesia) Pertamina Mandalika SAG Team	64	Ret	22	3	17	18	14	Ret	WD	17	15	Ret	13	18	17	12	8	16	17	22	24	34.5
14	(Indonesia) Pertamina Mandalika SAG Team	73										19	22										34.5
15	(Switzerland) Forward Team	4												20	15	23				19	Ret	26	4
15	(Switzerland) Forward Team	17	WD			DNS	Ret			Ret	18	DNS					18	19	19	13	20	23	4
15	(Switzerland) Forward Team	19						20	Ret														4
15	(Switzerland) Forward Team	24	21	24	Ret	20	17	Ret	20	WD	19												4
15	(Switzerland) Forward Team	55								22			26										4
15	(Switzerland) Forward Team	67										17	Ret	17	17	20	Ret	18	Ret				4
15	(Switzerland) Forward Team	98	Ret	Ret	22																		4
Pos.	Team	Bike No.	POR (Portugal)	ARG (Argentina)	AME (United States)	SPA (Spain)	FRA (France)	ITA (Italy)	GER (Germany)	NED (Netherlands)	GBR (United Kingdom)	AUT (Austria)	CAT (Catalonia)	RSM (San Marino)	IND (India)	JPN (Japan)	INA (Indonesia)	AUS‡ (Australia)	THA (Thailand)	MAL (Malaysia)	QAT (Qatar)	VAL (Valencian Community)	Pts

- ‡ – Half points were awarded during the Australian Grand Prix as less than 50 percent of the scheduled race distance (but at least three full laps) was completed.
