= 2024 Central Asian floods =

Natural disaster in Asia

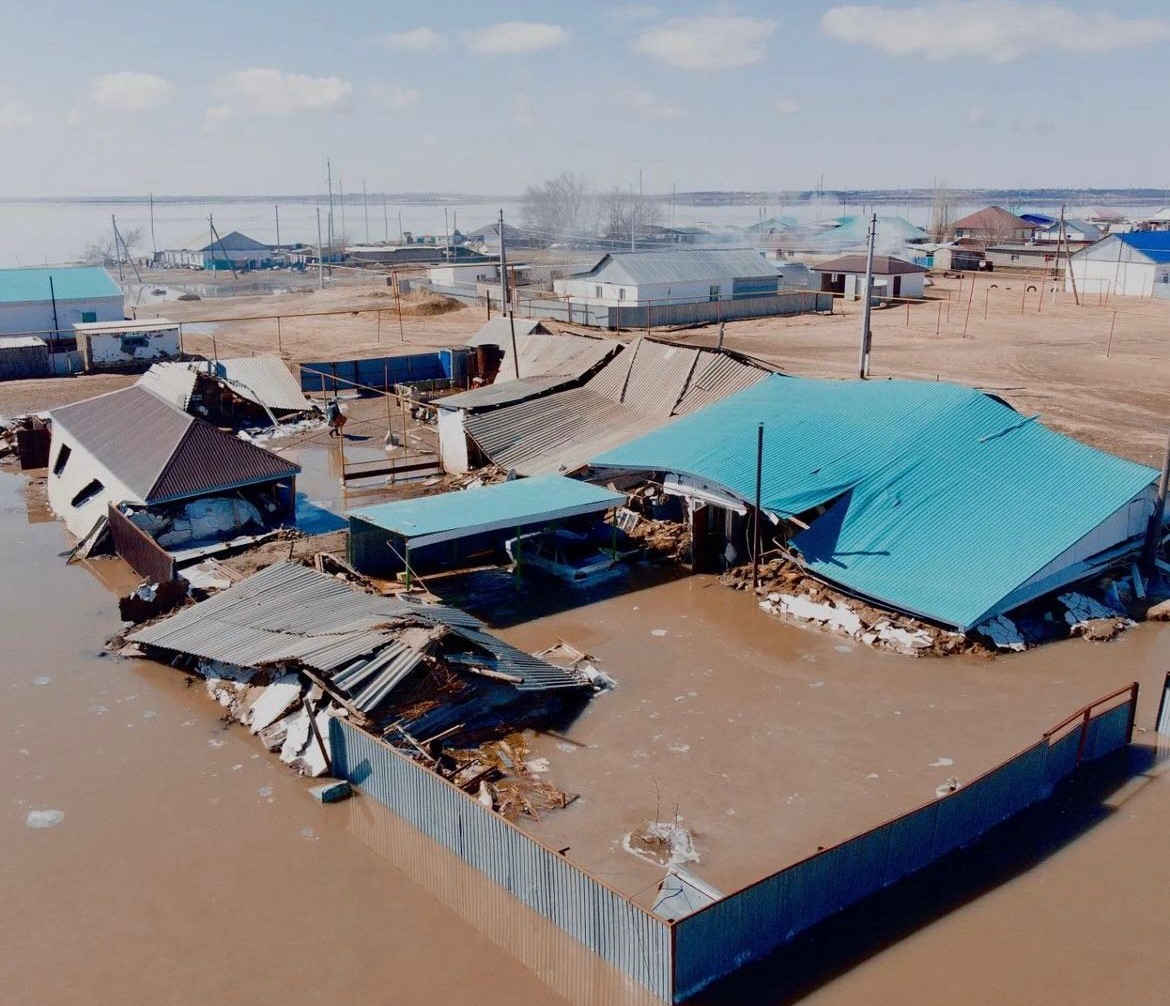
- Damage in Kazakhstan
- Date: April 2024
- Location: Central Asia (Kazakhstan, Russia)
- Deaths: 15

In April 2024, extensive flooding impacted several regions of Kazakhstan and Russia, specifically in the Ural Mountains and Siberia. Snow melt caused freshets resulting in the Orsk Dam collapsing. In Russia, a federal emergency was declared. Hundreds of thousands of people were evacuated, including over 86,000 people in Kazakhstan. At least eight people died and hundreds of livestock have drowned in floods that are described to have inundated an area the size of western Europe.

== Impact ==
=== Kazakhstan ===
The Ministry of Emergency Situations said on 10 April that it had evacuated 96,472 people, including 31,640 children, affected by the floods, which struck the western and northern parts of the country, including the cities of Aktobe and Petropavlovsk, as well as the regions of Atyrau, Aktobe, Akmola, Kostanay, East Kazakhstan, Northern Kazakhstan and Pavlodar.

On 3 May, the Grand Prix of Kazakhstan was "postponed until later in the season" due to the on-going flooding and then cancelled.

=== Russia ===
Flooding occurred in Orenburg, Tomsk, Tyumen and Kurgan Oblasts, which border Kazakhstan. The flooding was worsened by the collapse of a dam near Orsk on 5 April. Several major river systems have seen their water levels rise, including the Ural River, which flows through Russia and Kazakhstan before entering the Caspian Sea, and the Tobol and Ishim Rivers, both of which are tributaries of the Irtysh River. In Tyumen Oblast, authorities warned that flooding along the Tobol River would peak in May.

Apart from the Orsk Dam, several other dams in the affected areas failed due to heavy rains and increased volumes of water, including one in Novotroitsk, Orenburg Oblast, and another along the Tom River near Tomsk.

The Russian government has not confirmed any fatalities. On 17 April, the Russian investigative news outlet iStories reported that seven people had died from the floods in Orenburg Oblast, citing relatives of the victims who also accused authorities of withholding the circumstances of their deaths to avoid making compensation payments. On 22 April, the Russian investigative news outlet Agentstvo reported that the Dobrovolnoye uranium mines operated by Rosatom in Zverinogolovsky District, Kurgan Oblast, had been flooded, raising concerns over radioactive contamination in the Tobol River.
