= Sokol International Racetrack =

Motorsport race track in Kazakhstan

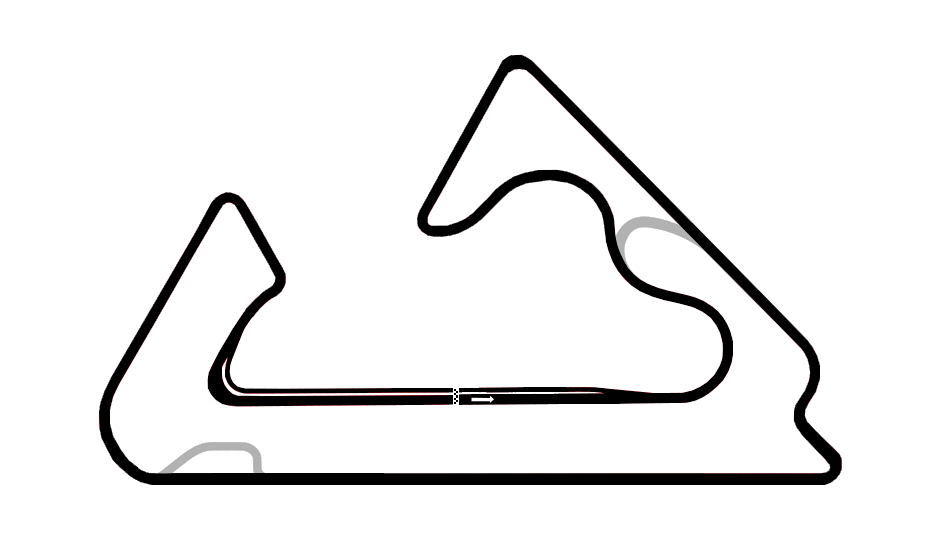
- Location: Almaty, Kazakhstan
- Coordinates: 43°35′5″N 76°34′14″E
- Capacity: 74,000
- Broke ground: 2014
- Opened: TBA
- Architect: Hermann Tilke
- Website: sokolracetrack.kz

Big Ring
- Surface: Asphalt
- Length: 4.495 km (2.793 mi)
- Turns: 13

Big Ring with Chicane
- Surface: Asphalt
- Length: 4.548 km (2.826 mi)
- Turns: 16

Small Ring
- Surface: Asphalt
- Length: 3.535 km (2.197 mi)
- Turns: 11

Small Ring with Chicane
- Surface: Asphalt
- Length: 3.588 km (2.229 mi)
- Turns: 14

The Sokol International Circuit (also known as CTK Sokol - Kazakh: Сокол халықаралық автодром, romanized: "Sokol" halyqaralyq avtodromy, Russian: Международный автодром "Сокол", romanized: Mezhdunarodnyy avtodrom "Sokol") is a motorsport race track 76 km (47 mi) northwest of Almaty, Kazakhstan. The 4.495 km (2.793 mi) circuit was designed by Hermann Tilke and is marketed as an FIA Grade 2 track.

== History ==
In July 2012, Kazakh businessman Alijan Ibragimov announced plans to build a US$40 million (KZ₸19 billion) motorsport facility on the outskirts of Almaty, the largest city in Kazakhstan, with construction scheduled to commence in September. RacingLoop were brought in as consultants and Hermann Tilke was charged with the design of a circuit intended to draw in MotoGP and the Deutsche Tourenwagen Masters, however ground was not broken until 2014.

By 2016 a go-kart track and a drag strip had been opened with Jorge Lorenzo in attendance, as circuit construction was well underway. Construction had progressed as far as electronic and timing installation by early 2019 before it ground to a halt due to political issues.

On 27 September 2022, it was announced that the circuit would host the Kazakhstan motorcycle Grand Prix until at least 2028 starting in 2023. However, due to ongoing homologation works at the circuit, paired with global operational challenges, the inaugural event was expected to be pushed back to 2024. However in 2024, the event was firstly postponed, then cancelled due to the on-going damages caused by Central Asian floods near to the circuit. It was also not included in the 2025 calendar.
