= 2023 Indonesian motorcycle Grand Prix =

Motorcycle races in Mandalika

(Indonesia) 2023 Indonesian Grand Prix
Race details
- Race 15 of 20 races in the 2023 Grand Prix motorcycle racing season
- Date: 15 October 2023
- Official name: Pertamina Grand Prix of Indonesia
- Location: Pertamina Mandalika International Circuit; Mandalika, Indonesia
- Course: Street circuit; 4.301 km (2.673 mi)

MotoGP
Pole position
Rider	(Italy) Luca Marini	Ducati
Time	1:29.978	
Fastest lap
Rider	(Italy) Enea Bastianini	Ducati
Time	1:30.906 on lap 18	
Podium
First	(Italy) Francesco Bagnaia	Ducati
Second	(Spain) Maverick Viñales	Aprilia
Third	(France) Fabio Quartararo	Yamaha

Moto2
Pole position
Rider	(Spain) Arón Canet	Kalex
Time	1:34.155	
Fastest lap
Rider	(Spain) Pedro Acosta	Kalex
Time	1:34.420 on lap 13	
Podium
First	(Spain) Pedro Acosta	Kalex
Second	(Spain) Arón Canet	Kalex
Third	(Spain) Fermín Aldeguer	Boscoscuro

Moto3
Pole position
Rider	(Brazil) Diogo Moreira	KTM
Time	1:39.085	
Fastest lap
Rider	(Spain) Iván Ortolá	KTM
Time	1:38.936 on lap 14	
Podium
First	(Brazil) Diogo Moreira	KTM
Second	(Colombia) David Alonso	Gas Gas
Third	(Spain) David Muñoz	KTM

The 2023 Indonesian motorcycle Grand Prix (officially known as the Pertamina Grand Prix of Indonesia) was the fifteenth round of the 2023 Grand Prix motorcycle racing season. It was held at the Pertamina Mandalika International Circuit in Mandalika on 15 October 2023.

After Jorge Martín's win in the MotoGP sprint, Ducati secured its fourth consecutive Constructors' Championship in the MotoGP class.

== Practice session ==
=== MotoGP ===
==== Combined Free Practice 1-2 ====
Free Practice sessions on Friday and Saturday do not determine riders to qualify for Q2.

Fastest session lap

Pos.	No.	Biker	Constructor	Free practice times	
Pos.	No.	Biker	Constructor	FP1	FP2
1	89	(Spain) Jorge Martín	Ducati	1:31.811	1:30.998
2	41	(Spain) Aleix Espargaró	Aprilia	1:32.347	1:31.028
3	12	(Spain) Maverick Viñales	Aprilia	1:31.913	1:31.094
4	20	(France) Fabio Quartararo	Yamaha	1:32.868	1:31.207
5	10	(Italy) Luca Marini	Ducati	1:32.811	1:31.252
6	5	(France) Johann Zarco	Ducati	1:33.101	1:31.374
7	21	(Italy) Franco Morbidelli	Yamaha	1:32.541	1:31.445
8	43	(Australia) Jack Miller	KTM	1:32.646	1:31.463
9	37	(Spain) Augusto Fernández	KTM	1:33.139	1:31.537
10	30	(Japan) Takaaki Nakagami	Honda	1:32.878	1:31.590
11	1	(Italy) Francesco Bagnaia	Ducati	1:32.570	1:31.703
12	49	(Italy) Fabio Di Giannantonio	Ducati	1:32.851	1:31.703
13	72	(Italy) Marco Bezzecchi	Ducati	1:32.552	1:31.709
14	23	(Italy) Enea Bastianini	Ducati	1:32.763	1:31.727
15	33	(South Africa) Brad Binder	KTM	1:32.668	1:31.761
16	88	(Portugal) Miguel Oliveira	Aprilia	1:33.447	1:31.769
17	44	(Spain) Pol Espargaró	KTM	1:34.547	1:31.807
18	25	(Spain) Raúl Fernández	Aprilia	1:33.248	1:31.818
19	93	(Spain) Marc Márquez	Honda	1:32.893	1:31.992
20	36	(Spain) Joan Mir	Honda	1:33.431	1:32.134
21	42	(Spain) Álex Rins	Honda	1:33.660	1:32.410
22	73	(Spain) Álex Márquez	Ducati	**1:33.556**	
OFFICIAL MOTOGP COMBINED FREE PRACTICE TIMES REPORT

==== Practice session ====
The top ten riders (written in bold) qualified for Q2.

Pos.	No.	Biker	Constructor	
Pos.	No.	Biker	Constructor	Time results
1	41	**(Spain) Aleix Espargaró**	**Aprilia**	**1:30.474**
2	12	**(Spain) Maverick Viñales**	**Aprilia**	**1:30.628**
3	72	**(Italy) Marco Bezzecchi**	**Ducati**	**1:30.644**
4	33	**(South Africa) Brad Binder**	**KTM**	**1:30.762**
5	89	**(Spain) Jorge Martín**	**Ducati**	**1:30.874**
6	93	**(Spain) Marc Márquez**	**Honda**	**1:31.106**
7	88	**(Portugal) Miguel Oliveira**	**Aprilia**	**1:31.199**
8	49	**(Italy) Fabio Di Giannantonio**	**Ducati**	**1:31.207**
9	43	**(Australia) Jack Miller**	**KTM**	**1:31.216**
10	20	**(France) Fabio Quartararo**	**Yamaha**	**1:31.229**
11	44	(Spain) Pol Espargaró	KTM	1:31.276
12	10	(Italy) Luca Marini	Ducati	1:31.367
13	5	(France) Johann Zarco	Ducati	1:31.457
14	25	(Spain) Raúl Fernández	Aprilia	1:31.500
15	21	(Italy) Franco Morbidelli	Yamaha	1:31.561
16	1	(Italy) Francesco Bagnaia	Ducati	1:31.635
17	30	(Japan) Takaaki Nakagami	Honda	1:31.655
18	37	(Spain) Augusto Fernández	KTM	1:31.808
19	36	(Spain) Joan Mir	Honda	1:32.127
20	23	(Italy) Enea Bastianini	Ducati	1:32.208
21	42	(Spain) Álex Rins	Honda	1:32.426
OFFICIAL MOTOGP PRACTICE TIMES REPORT

=== Moto2 ===
==== Combined Practice 1-2-3 ====
The top fourteen riders (written in bold) qualified for Q2.

Fastest session lap

Pos.	No.	Biker	Constructor	Free practice times		
Pos.	No.	Biker	Constructor	P1	P2	P3
1	40	**(Spain) Arón Canet**	**Kalex**	1:35.231	1:34.636	1:33.847
2	54	**(Spain) Fermín Aldeguer**	**Boscoscuro**	1.35.447	1:34.994	1:33.942
3	37	**(Spain) Pedro Acosta**	**Kalex**	1:38.344	1:34.456	1:33.970
4	18	**(Spain) Manuel González**	**Kalex**	1:34.871	1:34.769	1:34.279
5	35	**(Thailand) Somkiat Chantra**	**Kalex**	1:35.412	1:35.231	1:34.317
6	22	**(United Kingdom) Sam Lowes**	**Kalex**	1:35.342	1:35.678	1:34.342
7	84	**(Netherlands) Zonta van den Goorbergh**	**Kalex**	1:36.169	1:35.166	1:34.371
8	16	**(United States) Joe Roberts**	**Kalex**	1:35.846	1:35.183	1:34.373
9	14	**(Italy)** **Tony Arbolino**	**Kalex**	1:35.638	1:35.053	1:34.377
10	42	**(Spain) Marcos Ramírez**	**Kalex**	1:36.718	1:35.395	1:34.434
11	75	**(Spain) Albert Arenas**	**Kalex**	1:35.438	1:35.043	1:34.463
12	11	**(Spain) Sergio García**	**Kalex**	1:36.005	1:35.157	1:34.484
13	12	**(Czech Republic) Filip Salač**	**Kalex**	1:35.911	1:36.328	1:34.564
14	71	**(Italy) Dennis Foggia**	**Kalex**	1:35.515	NC	1:34.575
15	21	(Spain) Alonso López	Boscoscuro	1:36.521	1:35.445	1:34.582
16	28	(Spain) Izan Guevara	Kalex	1:36.562	1:35.442	1:34.587
17	7	(Belgium) Barry Baltus	Kalex	1:36.812	1:35.999	1:34.608
18	79	(Japan) Ai Ogura	Kalex	1:35.384	1:34.780	1:34.740
19	15	(South Africa) Darryn Binder	Kalex	1:36.662	1:35.461	1:34.761
20	64	(Netherlands) Bo Bendsneyder	Kalex	1:35.945	1:35.279	1:34.902
21	96	(United Kingdom) Jake Dixon	Kalex	1:35.260	1:34.970	1:34.920
22	17	(Spain) Álex Escrig	Forward	1:36.363	1:35.944	1:34.985
23	3	(Germany) Lukas Tulovic	Kalex	1:37.567	1:45.917	1:35.009
24	52	(Spain) Jeremy Alcoba	Kalex	1:36.138	1:35.728	1:35.072
25	67	(Italy) Alberto Surra	Forward	1:36.575	1:35.870	1:35.138
26	43	(Italy) Lorenzo Baldassarri	Kalex	1:37.081	1:36.150	1:35.221
27	33	(United Kingdom) Rory Skinner	Kalex	1:36.755	1:36.273	1:35.314
28	23	(Japan) Taiga Hada	Kalex	1:37.551	1:36.067	1:35.490
29	5	(Japan) Kohta Nozane	Kalex	1:35.926	1:36.238	1:35.651
30	9	(Italy) Mattia Casadei	Kalex	1:37.258	NC	1:35.942
Source : OFFICIAL MOTO2 COMBINED PRACTICE TIMES REPORT

=== Moto3 ===
==== Combined Practice 1-2-3 ====
The top fourteen riders (written in bold) qualified for Q2.

Fastest session lap

Pos.	No.	Biker	Constructor	Practice times		
Pos.	No.	Biker	Constructor	P1	P2	P3
1	5	(Spain) **Jaume Masià**	**Honda**	1:41.900	1:40.087	1:38.781
2	96	**(Spain) Daniel Holgado**	**KTM**	1:41.011	1:40.270	1:38.902
3	18	**(Italy) Matteo Bertelle**	**Honda**	1:40.109	1:40.109	1:38.974
4	10	(Brazil) **Diogo Moreira**	**KTM**	1:40.590	1:39.987	1:39.290
5	99	**(Spain) José Antonio Rueda**	**KTM**	1:41.220	1:40.754	1:39.374
6	71	(Japan) **Ayumu Sasaki**	**Husqvarna**	1:41.425	1:40.209	1:39.427
7	53	**(Turkey) Deniz Öncü**	**KTM**	1:41.391	1:39.855	1:39.445
8	82	**(Italy) Iván Ortolá**	**KTM**	1:41.562	1:40.801	1:39.453
9	80	**(Colombia) David Alonso**	**Gas Gas**	1:41.786	1:40.920	1:39.466
10	82	**(Italy) Stefano Nepa**	**KTM**	1:40.649	1:40.462	1:49.559
11	66	(Australia) **Joel Kelso**	**CFMoto**	1:41.366	1:40.837	1:39.623
12	44	**(Spain)** **David Muñoz**	**KTM**	1:41.714	1:40.437	1:39.707
13	19	**(United Kingdom) Scott Ogden**	**Honda**	1:41.727	1:41.143	1:39.724
14	93	**(Indonesia)** **Fadillah Arbi Aditama**	**Honda**	1:43.064	1:41.229	1:39.779
15	27	(Japan) Kaito Toba	Honda	1:42.439	1:40.612	1:39.842
16	7	(Italy) Filippo Farioli	KTM	1:44.189	1:41.362	1:39.844
17	95	(Netherlands) Collin Veijer	Husqvarna	1:42.094	1:40.811	1:39.877
18	31	(Spain) Adrián Fernández	Honda	1:41.847	1:40.929	1:39.842
19	43	(Spain) Xavier Artigas	CFMoto	1:41.701	1:41.438	1:39.957
20	72	(Japan) Taiyo Furusato	Honda	1:41.868	1:40.653	1:40.010
21	64	(Indonesia) Mario Aji	Honda	1:42.583	1:41.279	1:40.036
22	70	(United Kingdom) Joshua Whatley	Honda	1:41.929	1:41.018	1:40.045
23	6	(Japan) Ryusei Yamanaka	Gas Gas	1:41.893	1:40.650	1:40.203
24	54	(Italy) Riccardo Rossi	Honda	1:42.459	1:40.457	1:40.232
25	63	(Malaysia) Syarifuddin Azman	KTM	1:42.859	1:41.490	1:40.305
26	9	(Italy) Nicola Carraro	Honda	1:41.962	1:41.363	1:40.368
27	12	(Switzerland) Noah Dettwiler	KTM	1:43.411	1:42.299	1:40.537
28	20	(France) Lorenzo Fellon	KTM	1:43.238	1:41.419	1:40.712
29	22	(Spain) Ana Carrasco	KTM	1:43.435	1:41.868	1:41.027
Source : OFFICIAL MOTO3 COMBINED PRACTICE TIMES REPORT

== Qualifying ==
=== MotoGP ===
Fastest session lap

Pos.	No.	Biker	Constructor	Qualifying times		Final grid	Row
Pos.	No.	Biker	Constructor	Q1	Q2	Final grid	Row
1	10	(Italy) Luca Marini	Ducati	1:30.383	1:29.978	1	1
2	12	(Spain) Maverick Viñales	Aprilia	Qualified in Q2	1:30.009	2	1
3	41	(Spain) Aleix Espargaró	Aprilia	Qualified in Q2	1:30.132	3	1
4	20	(France) Fabio Quartararo	Yamaha	Qualified in Q2	1:30.516	4	2
5	33	(South Africa) Brad Binder	KTM	Qualified in Q2	1:30.698	5	2
6	89	(Spain) Jorge Martín	Ducati	Qualified in Q2	1:30.742	6	2
7	49	(Italy) Fabio Di Giannantonio	Ducati	Qualified in Q2	1:30.766	7	3
8	93	(Spain) Marc Márquez	Honda	Qualified in Q2	1:30.864	8	3
9	72	(Italy) Marco Bezzecchi	Ducati	Qualified in Q2	1:30.908	9	3
10	43	(Australia) Jack Miller	KTM	Qualified in Q2	1:30.970	10	4
11	23	(Italy) Enea Bastianini	Ducati	1:30.527	1:31.061	11	4
12	88	(Portugal) Miguel Oliveira	Aprilia	Qualified in Q2	1:31.193	12	4
13	1	(Italy) Francesco Bagnaia	Ducati	1:30.626	N/A	13	5
14	5	(France) Johann Zarco	Ducati	1:30.713	N/A	14	5
15	20	(Italy) Franco Morbidelli	Yamaha	1:30.729	N/A	15	5
16	44	(Spain) Pol Espargaró	KTM	1:31.006	N/A	16	6
17	25	(Spain) Raúl Fernández	Aprilia	1:31.031	N/A	17	6
18	37	(Spain) Augusto Fernández	KTM	1:31.034	N/A	18	6
19	36	(Spain) Joan Mir	Honda	1:31.143	N/A	19	7
20	30	(Japan) Takaaki Nakagami	Honda	1:31.192	N/A	20	7
21	42	(Spain) Álex Rins	Honda	1:31.458	N/A	21	7
OFFICIAL MOTOGP QUALIFYING RESULTS

=== Moto2 ===
Fastest session lap

Pos.	No.	Biker	Constructor	Qualifying times		Final grid	Row
Pos.	No.	Biker	Constructor	Q1	Q2	Final grid	Row
1	40	(Spain) Arón Canet	Kalex	Qualified in Q2	1:34.155	1	1
2	18	(Spain) Manuel González	Kalex	Qualified in Q2	1:34.158	2	1
3	12	(Czech Republic) Filip Salač	Kalex	Qualified in Q2	1:34.174	3	1
4	54	(Spain) Pedro Acosta	Kalex	Qualified in Q2	1:34.198	4	2
5	54	(Spain) Fermín Aldeguer	Boscoscuro	Qualified in Q2	1:34.226	5	2
6	35	(Thailand) Somkiat Chantra	Kalex	Qualified in Q2	1:34.316	6	2
7	96	(United Kingdom) Jake Dixon	Kalex	1:34.406	1:34.344	7	3
8	22	(United Kingdom) Sam Lowes	Kalex	Qualified in Q2	1:34.382	8	3
9	84	(Netherlands) Zonta van den Goorbergh	Kalex	Qualified in Q2	1:34.388	9	3
10	14	(Italy) Tony Arbolino	Kalex	Qualified in Q2	1:34.411	10	4
11	16	(United States) Joe Roberts	Kalex	Qualified in Q2	1:34.529	11	4
12	11	(Spain) Sergio García	Kalex	Qualified in Q2	1:34.573	12	4
13	64	(Netherlands) Bo Bendsneyder	Kalex	1:34.685	1:34.604	13	5
14	75	(Spain) Albert Arenas	Kalex	Qualified in Q2	1:34.613	14	5
15	52	(Spain) Jeremy Alcoba	Kalex	1:34.027	1:34.774	15	5
16	71	(Italy) Dennis Foggia	Kalex	Qualified in Q2	1:34.788	16	6
17	42	(Spain) Marcos Ramírez	Kalex	Qualified in Q2	1:34.983	17	6
18	21	(Spain) Alonso López	Boscoscuro	1:34.608	1:35.084	18	6
19	79	(Japan) Ai Ogura	Kalex	1:34.732	N/A	19	7
20	15	(South Africa) Darryn Binder	Kalex	1:34.762	N/A	20	7
21	17	(Spain) Álex Escrig	Forward	1:34.781	N/A	21	7
22	67	(Italy) Alberto Surra	Forward	1:34.795	N/A	22	8
23	7	(Belgium) Barry Baltus	Kalex	1:34.984	N/A	23	8
24	23	(Japan) Taiga Hada	Kalex	1:35.105	N/A	24	8
25	43	(Italy) Lorenzo Baldassarri	Kalex	1:35.163	N/A	25	9
26	3	(Germany) Lukas Tulovic	Kalex	1:35.293	N/A	26	9
27	28	(Spain) Izan Guevara	Kalex	1:35.352	N/A	27	9
28	33	(United Kingdom) Rory Skinner	Kalex	1:35.412	N/A	28	10
29	5	(Japan) Kohta Nozane	Kalex	1:35.437	N/A	29	10
30	9	(Italy) Mattia Casadei	Kalex	1:35.839	N/A	30	10
OFFICIAL MOTO2 QUALIFYING RESULTS

=== Moto3 ===
Fastest session lap

Pos.	No.	Biker	Constructor	Qualifying times		Final grid	Row
Pos.	No.	Biker	Constructor	Q1	Q2	Final grid	Row
1	10	(Brazil) Diogo Moreira	KTM	Qualified in Q2	1:39.085	1	1
2	5	(Spain) Jaume Masià	Honda	Qualified in Q2	1:39.125	2	1
3	80	(Colombia) David Alonso	Gas Gas	Qualified in Q2	1:39.310	3	1
4	95	(Netherlands) Collin Veijer	Husqvarna	1:39.746	1:39.363	4	2
5	53	(Turkey) Deniz Öncü	KTM	Qualified in Q2	1:39.368	5	2
6	72	(Japan) Taiyo Furusato	Honda	1:39.606	1:39.369	6	2
7	96	(Spain) Daniel Holgado	KTM	Qualified in Q2	1:39.426	7	3
8	18	(Italy) Matteo Bertelle	Honda	Qualified in Q2	1:39.443	8	3
9	82	(Italy) Stefano Nepa	KTM	Qualified in Q2	1:39.466	9	3
10	44	(Spain) David Muñoz	KTM	Qualified in Q2	1:39.473	10	4
11	71	(Japan) Ayumu Sasaki	Husqvarna	Qualified in Q2	1:39.550	11	4
12	48	(Spain) Iván Ortolá	KTM	Qualified in Q2	1:39.760	12	4
13	66	(Australia) Joel Kelso	CFMoto	Qualified in Q2	1:39.813	13	5
14	31	(Spain) Adrián Fernández	Honda	1:39.944	1:39.910	14	5
15	93	(Indonesia) Arbi Aditama	Honda	Qualified in Q2	1:40.018	15	5
16	99	(Spain) José Antonio Rueda	KTM	Qualified in Q2	1:40.164	16	6
17	19	(United Kingdom) Scott Ogden	Honda	Qualified in Q2	1:40.271	17	6
18	70	(United Kingdom) Joshua Whatley	Honda	1:40.167	1:40.907	18	6
19	6	(Japan) Ryusei Yamanaka	Gas Gas	1:40.179	N/A	19	7
20	54	(United Kingdom) Riccardo Rossi	Honda	1:40.239	N/A	20	7
21	64	(Indonesia) Mario Aji	Honda	1:40.318	N/A	21	7
22	27	(Japan) Kaito Toba	Honda	1:40.471	N/A	22	8
23	9	(Italy) Nicola Carraro	Honda	1:40.490	N/A	23	8
24	20	(France) Lorenzo Fellon	KTM	1:40.628	N/A	24	8
25	22	(Spain) Ana Carrasco	KTM	1:40.689	N/A	25	9
26	43	(Spain) Xavier Artigas	CFMoto	1:40.726	N/A	26	9
27	7	(Italy) Filippo Farioli	KTM	1:40.758	N/A	27	9
28	63	(Malaysia) Syarifuddin Azman	KTM	1:40.899	N/A	28	10
29	12	(Switzerland) Noah Dettwiler	KTM	1:41.410	N/A	29	10
OFFICIAL MOTO3 QUALIFYING RESULTS							10

== MotoGP Sprint ==
The MotoGP Sprint was held on 14 October.

Pos.	No.	Rider	Team	Constructor	Laps	Time/Retired	Grid	Points
1	89	(Spain) Jorge Martín	Prima Pramac Racing	Ducati	13	19:49.711	6	12
2	10	(Italy) Luca Marini	Mooney VR46 Racing Team	Ducati	13	+1.131	1	9
3	72	(Italy) Marco Bezzecchi	Mooney VR46 Racing Team	Ducati	13	+2.081	9	7
4	12	(Spain) Maverick Viñales	Aprilia Racing	Aprilia	13	+2.720	2	6
5	20	(France) Fabio Quartararo	Monster Energy Yamaha MotoGP	Yamaha	13	+3.121	4	5
6	49	(Italy) Fabio Di Giannantonio	Gresini Racing MotoGP	Ducati	13	+4.203	7	4
7	23	(Italy) Enea Bastianini	Ducati Lenovo Team	Ducati	13	+4.981	11	3
8	1	(Italy) Francesco Bagnaia	Ducati Lenovo Team	Ducati	13	+5.465	13	2
9	43	(Australia) Jack Miller	Red Bull KTM Factory Racing	KTM	13	+7.852	10	1
10	88	(Portugal) Miguel Oliveira	CryptoData RNF MotoGP Team	Aprilia	13	+8.942	12	
11	30	(Japan) Takaaki Nakagami	LCR Honda Idemitsu	Honda	13	+12.034	20	
12	5	(France) Johann Zarco	Prima Pramac Racing	Ducati	13	+14.015	14	
13	37	(Spain) Augusto Fernández	GasGas Factory Racing Tech3	KTM	13	+14.823	18	
14	25	(Spain) Raúl Fernández	CryptoData RNF MotoGP Team	Aprilia	13	+15.699	17	
15	21	(Italy) Franco Morbidelli	Monster Energy Yamaha MotoGP	Yamaha	13	+23.331	15	
16	36	(Spain) Joan Mir	Repsol Honda Team	Honda	13	+24.894	19	
17	44	(Spain) Pol Espargaró	GasGas Factory Racing Tech3	KTM	13	+27.169	16	
18	42	(Spain) Álex Rins	LCR Honda Castrol	Honda	13	+28.980	21	
19	33	(South Africa) Brad Binder	Red Bull KTM Factory Racing	KTM	13	+43.090	5	
Ret	41	(Spain) Aleix Espargaró	Aprilia Racing	Aprilia	7	Collision damage	3	
Ret	93	(Spain) Marc Márquez	Repsol Honda Team	Honda	0	Accident	8	
DNS	73	(Spain) Álex Márquez	Gresini Racing MotoGP	Ducati		Did not start		
Fastest sprint lap: (Italy) Marco Bezzecchi (Ducati) – 1:30.724 (lap 5)
OFFICIAL MOTOGP SPRINT REPORT

- Álex Márquez competed during Free Practice 1, but withdrew from the rest of the weekend, citing pain from a previous injury.

== Warm up practice ==
=== MotoGP ===
Maverick Viñales set the best time 1:31.043 and was the fastest rider at this session ahead of Jorge Martín and Takaaki Nakagami.

== Race ==
=== MotoGP ===
Pos.	No.	Rider	Team	Constructor	Laps	Time/Retired	Grid	Points
1	1	(Italy) Francesco Bagnaia	Ducati Lenovo Team	Ducati	27	41:20.293	13	25
2	12	(Spain) Maverick Viñales	Aprilia Racing	Aprilia	27	+0.306	2	20
3	20	(France) Fabio Quartararo	Monster Energy Yamaha MotoGP	Yamaha	27	+0.433	4	16
4	49	(Italy) Fabio Di Giannantonio	Gresini Racing MotoGP	Ducati	27	+6.962	7	13
5	72	(Italy) Marco Bezzecchi	Mooney VR46 Racing Team	Ducati	27	+11.111	9	11
6	33	(South Africa) Brad Binder	Red Bull KTM Factory Racing	KTM	27	+11.228	5	10
7	43	(Australia) Jack Miller	Red Bull KTM Factory Racing	KTM	27	+12.474	10	9
8	23	(Italy) Enea Bastianini	Ducati Lenovo Team	Ducati	27	+12.684	11	8
9	42	(Spain) Álex Rins	LCR Honda Castrol	Honda	27	+22.540	21	7
10	41	(Spain) Aleix Espargaró	Aprilia Racing	Aprilia	27	+30.468	3	6
11	30	(Japan) Takaaki Nakagami	LCR Honda Idemitsu	Honda	27	+30.823	20	5
12	88	(Portugal) Miguel Oliveira	CryptoData RNF MotoGP Team	Aprilia	27	+36.639	12	4
13	25	(Spain) Raúl Fernández	CryptoData RNF MotoGP Team	Aprilia	27	+42.864	17	3
14	21	(Italy) Franco Morbidelli	Monster Energy Yamaha MotoGP	Yamaha	23	+4 laps	15	2
Ret	5	(France) Johann Zarco	Prima Pramac Racing	Ducati	14	Accident	14	
Ret	89	(Spain) Jorge Martín	Prima Pramac Racing	Ducati	12	Accident	6	
Ret	36	(Spain) Joan Mir	Repsol Honda Team	Honda	11	Accident	19	
Ret	37	(Spain) Augusto Fernández	GasGas Factory Racing Tech3	KTM	11	Accident	18	
Ret	93	(Spain) Marc Márquez	Repsol Honda Team	Honda	7	Accident	8	
Ret	10	(Italy) Luca Marini	Mooney VR46 Racing Team	Ducati	4	Collision damage	1	
Ret	44	(Spain) Pol Espargaró	GasGas Factory Racing Tech3	KTM	1	Accident	16	
DNS	73	(Spain) Álex Márquez	Gresini Racing MotoGP	Ducati		Did not start		
Fastest lap: (Italy) Enea Bastianini (Ducati) – 1:30.906 (lap 18)
OFFICIAL MOTOGP RACE REPORT

=== Moto2 ===
Pos.	No.	Rider	Constructor	Laps	Time/Retired	Grid	Points
1	37	(Spain) Pedro Acosta	Kalex	22	34:51.641	4	25
2	40	(Spain) Arón Canet	Kalex	22	+2.044	1	20
3	54	(Spain) Fermín Aldeguer	Boscoscuro	22	+4.716	5	16
4	96	(United Kingdom) Jake Dixon	Kalex	22	+9.082	7	13
5	18	(Spain) Manuel González	Kalex	22	+9.309	2	11
6	14	(Italy) Tony Arbolino	Kalex	22	+11.721	10	10
7	35	(Thailand) Somkiat Chantra	Kalex	22	+13.181	6	9
8	11	(Spain) Sergio García	Kalex	22	+15.095	12	8
9	16	(United States) Joe Roberts	Kalex	22	+18.296	11	7
10	22	(United Kingdom) Sam Lowes	Kalex	22	+19.165	8	6
11	71	(Italy) Dennis Foggia	Kalex	22	+19.589	16	5
12	64	(Netherlands) Bo Bendsneyder	Kalex	22	+19.853	13	4
13	15	(South Africa) Darryn Binder	Kalex	22	+19.986	20	3
14	23	(Japan) Taiga Hada	Kalex	22	+21.904	24	2
15	75	(Spain) Albert Arenas	Kalex	22	+23.032	14	1
16	24	(Spain) Marcos Ramírez	Kalex	22	+27.129	17	
17	79	(Japan) Ai Ogura	Kalex	22	+29.275	19	
18	17	(Spain) Álex Escrig	Forward	22	+31.577	21	
19	33	(United Kingdom) Rory Skinner	Kalex	22	+32.869	28	
20	52	(Spain) Jeremy Alcoba	Kalex	22	+34.613	15	
21	28	(Spain) Izan Guevara	Kalex	22	+36.857	27	
22	3	(Germany) Lukas Tulovic	Kalex	22	+42.548	26	
23	43	(Italy) Lorenzo Baldassarri	Kalex	22	+44.646	25	
24	9	(Italy) Mattia Casadei	Kalex	22	+50.906	30	
25	21	(Spain) Alonso López	Boscoscuro	21	+1 lap	18	
Ret	7	(Belgium) Barry Baltus	Kalex	12	Gearbox	23	
Ret	84	(Netherlands) Zonta van den Goorbergh	Kalex	8	Accident	9	
Ret	5	(Japan) Kohta Nozane	Kalex	4	Accident	29	
Ret	12	(Czech Republic) Filip Salač	Kalex	1	Accident	3	
Ret	67	(Italy) Alberto Surra	Forward	0	Collision	22	
Fastest lap: (Spain) Pedro Acosta (Kalex) – 1:34.420 (lap 13)
OFFICIAL MOTO2 RACE REPORT

=== Moto3 ===
Pos.	No.	Rider	Constructor	Laps	Time/Retired	Grid	Points
1	10	(Brazil) Diogo Moreira	KTM	20	33:19.002	1	25
2	11	(Colombia) David Alonso	Gas Gas	20	+0.107	3	20
3	44	(Spain) David Muñoz	KTM	20	+0.130	10	16
4	95	(Netherlands) Collin Veijer	Husqvarna	20	+0.190	4	13
5	99	(Spain) José Antonio Rueda	KTM	20	+0.483	16	11
6	5	(Spain) Jaume Masià	Honda	20	+0.544	2	10
7	72	(Japan) Taiyo Furusato	Honda	20	+0.811	6	9
8	53	(Turkey) Deniz Öncü	KTM	20	+0.855	5	8
9	48	(Spain) Iván Ortolá	KTM	20	+1.164	12	7
10	82	(Italy) Stefano Nepa	KTM	20	+1.253	9	6
11	18	(Italy) Matteo Bertelle	Honda	20	+1.346	8	5
12	27	(Japan) Kaito Toba	Honda	20	+1.447	22	4
13	54	(Italy) Riccardo Rossi	Honda	20	+1.815	20	3
14	96	(Spain) Daniel Holgado	KTM	20	+4.018 (Note: Three-second penalty for making a shortcut at turn 9.)	7	2
15	6	(Japan) Ryusei Yamanaka	Gas Gas	20	+9.094	19	1
16	66	(Australia) Joel Kelso	CFMoto	20	+9.404	13	
17	93	(Indonesia) Fadillah Arbi Aditama	Honda	20	+12.750	15	
18	71	(Japan) Ayumu Sasaki	Husqvarna	20	+19.692	11	
19	43	(Spain) Xavier Artigas	CFMoto	20	+19.733	26	
20	7	(Italy) Filippo Farioli	KTM	20	+27.823	27	
21	9	(Italy) Nicola Carraro	Honda	20	+27.950	23	
22	70	(United Kingdom) Joshua Whatley	Honda	20	+28.040	18	
23	20	(France) Lorenzo Fellon	KTM	20	+28.091	24	
24	63	(Malaysia) Syarifuddin Azman	KTM	20	+28.221	28	
25	64	(Indonesia) Mario Aji	Honda	20	+28.454	21	
26	12	(Switzerland) Noah Dettwiler	KTM	20	+39.844	29	
Ret	19	(United Kingdom) Scott Ogden	Honda	11	Accident	17	
Ret	31	(Spain) Adrián Fernández	Honda	9	Accident	14	
Ret	22	(Spain) Ana Carrasco	KTM	3	Accident	25	
Fastest lap: (Spain) Iván Ortolá (KTM) – 1:38.936 (lap 14)
OFFICIAL MOTO3 RACE REPORT

== Championship standings after the race ==
Below are the standings for the top five riders, constructors, and teams after the round.

=== MotoGP ===
Riders' Championship standings

Pos.	Rider	Points
1	(Italy) Francesco Bagnaia	346
2	(Spain) Jorge Martín	328
3	(Italy) Marco Bezzecchi	283
4	(South Africa) Brad Binder	211
5	(Spain) Aleix Espargaró	177

Constructors' Championship standings

	Pos.	Constructor	Points
	1	(Italy) Ducati	527
	2	(Austria) KTM	283
	3	(Italy) Aprilia	266
1	4	(Japan) Yamaha	152
1	5	(Japan) Honda	149

Teams' Championship standings

Pos.	Team	Points
1	(Italy) Prima Pramac Racing	490
2	(Italy) Mooney VR46 Racing Team	427
3	(Italy) Ducati Lenovo Team	392
4	(Austria) Red Bull KTM Factory Racing	346
5	(Italy) Aprilia Racing	342

=== Moto2 ===
Riders' Championship standings

	Pos.	Rider	Points
	1	(Spain) Pedro Acosta	277
	2	(Italy) Tony Arbolino	212
	3	(United Kingdom) Jake Dixon	172
	4	(Spain) Arón Canet	144
1	5	(Thailand) Somkiat Chantra	123

Constructors' Championship standings

Pos.	Constructor	Points
1	(Germany) Kalex	370
2	(Italy) Boscoscuro	178
3	(Switzerland) Forward	1

Teams' Championship standings

	Pos.	Team	Points
	1	(Finland) Red Bull KTM Ajo	339
	2	(Belgium) Elf Marc VDS Racing Team	292
2	3	(Spain) Pons Wegow Los40	228
	4	(Italy) Beta Tools Speed Up	223
2	5	(Japan) Idemitsu Honda Team Asia	218

=== Moto3 ===
Riders' Championship standings

Pos.	Rider	Points
1	(Spain) Jaume Masià	209
2	(Japan) Ayumu Sasaki	193
3	(Spain) Daniel Holgado	192
4	(Colombia) David Alonso	180
5	(Turkey) Deniz Öncü	155

Constructors' Championship standings

Pos.	Constructor	Points
1	(Austria) KTM	313
2	(Japan) Honda	250
3	(Sweden) Husqvarna	211
4	(Spain) Gas Gas	197
5	(China) CFMoto	71

Teams' Championship standings

	Pos.	Team	Points
	1	(Germany) Liqui Moly Husqvarna Intact GP	269
1	2	(Finland) Red Bull KTM Ajo	266
1	3	(Luxembourg) Leopard Racing	259
	4	(Italy) Angeluss MTA Team	248
	5	(Spain) Gaviota GasGas Aspar Team	243

== Notes ==
Previous race: 2023 Japanese Grand Prix	FIM Grand Prix World Championship; 2023 season	Next race: 2023 Australian Grand Prix
Previous race: 2022 Indonesian Grand Prix	Indonesian motorcycle Grand Prix	Next race: 2024 Indonesian Grand Prix
