= Kazakhstan motorcycle Grand Prix =

Proposed motorcycle race

Kazakhstan Grand Prix
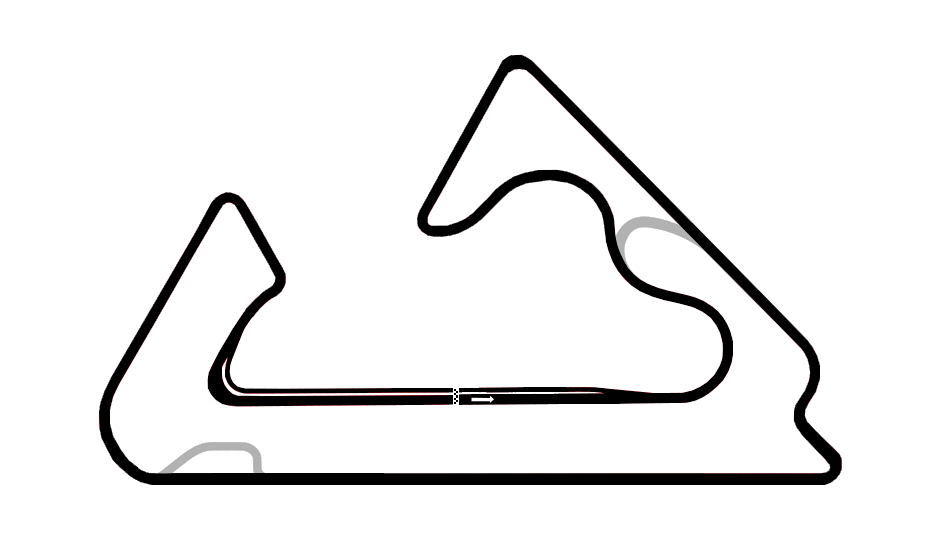

Grand Prix motorcycle racing
- Venue: Sokol International Racetrack

The Kazakhstan motorcycle Grand Prix was a proposed motorcycle race expected to be part of MotoGP at the Sokol International Racetrack in Kazakhstan.

A five-year contract was agreed and set to start with a scheduled event in 2023. The initial event was cancelled with the announcement naming the reasons as "ongoing homologation works at the circuit, paired with current global operational challenges. The event was not replaced and returned to the calendar in 2024. However in 2024, the event was firstly postponed, then cancelled due to the on-going damages caused by Central Asian floods near to the circuit, and other incomplete homologation works, with the event being replaced with the Emilia Romagna motorcycle Grand Prix. The race was also not included in the 2025 calendar due to construction was not completed, so it is now considered as a proposed race.
