= 2023 Qatar motorcycle Grand Prix =

Motorcycle races in Lusail

2023 Qatar Grand Prix
Race details
- Race 19 of 20 races in the 2023 Grand Prix motorcycle racing season
- Date: 19 November 2023
- Official name: Qatar Airways Grand Prix of Qatar
- Location: Lusail International Circuit; Lusail, Qatar
- Course: Permanent racing facility; 5.380 km (3.343 mi)

MotoGP
Pole position
Rider	(Italy) Luca Marini	Ducati
Time	1:51.762	
Fastest lap
Rider	(Italy) Enea Bastianini	Ducati
Time	1:52.978 on lap 22	
Podium
First	(Italy) Fabio Di Giannantonio	Ducati
Second	(Italy) Francesco Bagnaia	Ducati
Third	(Italy) Luca Marini	Ducati

Moto2
Pole position
Rider	(United States) Joe Roberts	Kalex
Time	1:57.305	
Fastest lap
Rider	(United Kingdom) Sam Lowes	Kalex
Time	1:57.366 on lap 18	
Podium
First	(Spain) Fermín Aldeguer	Boscosuro
Second	(Spain) Manuel González	Kalex
Third	(Spain) Arón Canet	Kalex

Moto3
Pole position
Rider	(Spain) Daniel Holgado	KTM
Time	2:04.742	
Fastest lap
Rider	(Japan) Ayumu Sasaki	Husqvarna
Time	2:05.501 on lap 15	
Podium
First	(Spain) Jaume Masià	Honda
Second	(Colombia) David Alonso	Gas Gas
Third	(Turkey) Deniz Öncü	KTM

The 2023 Qatar motorcycle Grand Prix (officially known as the Qatar Airways Grand Prix of Qatar) was the nineteenth round of the 2023 Grand Prix motorcycle racing season. It was held at the Lusail International Circuit in Lusail on 19 November 2023.

For the first time since 2006, the Grand Prix was not held as the opening round of the season due to the renovation of the circuit.

In the MotoGP class, Prima Pramac Racing became the first independent team to win the Teams' Championship.

In the Moto2 class, Red Bull KTM Ajo won their third consecutive and fourth overall Teams' Championship.

In the Moto3 class, Jaume Masià won the Grand Prix and clinched the Riders' Championship.

== Practice session ==
=== MotoGP ===
==== Combined Free Practice 1-2 ====
Free Practice sessions on Friday and Saturday do not determine riders to qualify for Q2.

Fastest session lap

Pos.	No.	Biker	Constructor	Free practice times	
Pos.	No.	Biker	Constructor	FP1	FP2
1	20	(France) Fabio Quartararo	Yamaha	1:56.961	1:53.531
2	89	(Spain) Jorge Martín	Ducati	1:56.393	1:53.604
3	41	(Spain) Aleix Espargaró	Aprilia	1:56.820	1:53.604
4	49	(Italy) Fabio Di Giannantonio	Ducati	1:56.830	1:53.657
5	21	(Italy) Franco Morbidelli	Yamaha	1:56.804	1:53.672
6	88	(Portugal) Miguel Oliveira	Aprilia	1:57.606	1:53.899
7	5	(France) Johann Zarco	Ducati	1:56.565	1:53.916
8	12	(Spain) Maverick Viñales	Aprilia	1:56.975	1:54.039
9	73	(Spain) Álex Márquez	Ducati	1:57.835	1:54.048
10	1	(Italy) Francesco Bagnaia	Ducati	1:56.622	1:54.069
OFFICIAL MOTOGP COMBINED FREE PRACTICE TIMES REPORT

==== Practice ====
The top ten riders (written in bold) qualified for Q2.

Pos.	No.	Biker	Constructor	
Pos.	No.	Biker	Constructor	Time results
1	25	**(Spain) Raúl Fernández**	**Aprilia**	**1:52.843**
2	49	**(Italy) Fabio Di Giannantonio**	**Ducati**	**1:52.892**
3	12	**(Spain) Maverick Viñales**	**Aprilia**	**1:52.936**
4	33	**(South Africa) Brad Binder**	**KTM**	**1:52.955**
5	41	**(Spain) Aleix Espargaró**	**Aprilia**	**1:53.033**
6	10	**(Italy) Luca Marini**	**Ducati**	**1:53.094**
7	89	**(Spain) Jorge Martín**	**Ducati**	**1:53.094**
8	1	**(Italy) Francesco Bagnaia**	**Ducati**	**1:53.202**
9	37	**(Spain) Augusto Fernández**	**KTM**	**1:53.289**
10	93	**(Spain) Marc Márquez**	**Honda**	**1:53.323**
11	43	(Australia) Jack Miller	KTM	1:53.337
12	73	(Spain) Álex Márquez	Ducati	1:53.561
13	21	(Italy) Franco Morbidelli	Yamaha	1:53.564
14	44	(Spain) Pol Espargaró	KTM	1:53.696
15	72	(Italy) Marco Bezzecchi	Ducati	1:53.704
16	5	(France) Johann Zarco	Ducati	1:53.778
17	36	(Spain) Joan Mir	Honda	1:53.921
18	23	(Italy) Enea Bastianini	Ducati	1:53.937
19	88	(Portugal) Miguel Oliveira	Aprilia	1:53.005
20	27	(Spain) Iker Lecuona	Honda	1:54.254
21	20	(France) Fabio Quartararo	Yamaha	1:54.260
22	30	(Japan) Takaaki Nakagami	Honda	1.54.441
OFFICIAL MOTOGP PRACTICE TIMES REPORT

=== Moto2 ===
==== Combined Practice 1-2-3 ====
The top fourteen riders (written in bold) qualified for Q2.

Fastest session lap

Pos.	No.	Biker	Constructor	Free practice times		
Pos.	No.	Biker	Constructor	P1	P2	P3
1	54	**(Spain) Fermín Aldeguer**	**Boscoscuro**	2:01.097	1:58.059	**1:57.895**
2	16	**(United States) Joe Roberts**	**Kalex**	2:03.418	1:59.231	**1:58.087**
3	96	**(United Kingdom) Jake Dixon**	**Kalex**	2:01.768	1:58.581	**1:58.203**
4	18	**(Spain) Manuel González**	**Kalex**	2:01.440	1:58.673	**1:58.262**
5	3	**(Germany) Lukas Tulovic**	**Kalex**	2:06.246	2:00.299	**1:58.373**
Source : OFFICIAL MOTO2 COMBINED PRACTICE TIMES REPORT

=== Moto3 ===
==== Combined Practice 1-2-3 ====
The top fourteen riders (written in bold) qualified for Q2.

Fastest session lap

Pos.	No.	Biker	Constructor	Practice times		
Pos.	No.	Biker	Constructor	P1	P2	P3
1	53	**(Turkey) Deniz Öncü**	**KTM**	2:09.404	2:08.421	**2:05.843**
2	80	**(Colombia) David Alonso**	**Gas Gas**	2:10.971	2:07.795	'2:06.049
3	66	**(Spain) Daniel Holgado**	**KTM**	2:11.293	2:08.063	**2:06.067**
4	71	(Japan) **Ayumu Sasaki**	**Husqvarna**	2:12.815	2:07.868	**2:06.282**
5	5	**(Spain)** **Jaume Masià**	**Honda**	2:09.817	**2:06.794**	2:06.318
Source : OFFICIAL MOTO3 COMBINED PRACTICE TIMES REPORT

== Qualifying ==
=== MotoGP ===
Fastest session lap

Pos.	No.	Biker	Constructor	Qualifying times		Final grid	Row
Pos.	No.	Biker	Constructor	Q1	Q2	Final grid	Row
1	10	(Italy) Luca Marini	Ducati	Qualified in Q2	1:51.762	1	1
2	49	(Italy) Fabio Di Giannantonio	Ducati	Qualified in Q2	1:51.892	2	1
3	73	(Spain) Álex Márquez	Ducati	1:52.437	1:51.898	3	1
4	1	(Italy) Francesco Bagnaia	Ducati	Qualified in Q2	1:52.036	4	2
5	89	(Spain) Jorge Martín	Ducati	Qualified in Q2	1:52.058	5	2
6	5	(France) Johann Zarco	Ducati	1:52.382	1:52.101	6	2
7	93	(Spain) Marc Márquez	Honda	Qualified in Q2	1:52.103	7	3
8	12	(Spain) Maverick Viñales	Aprilia	Qualified in Q2	1:52.175	8	3
9	25	(Spain) Raúl Fernández	Aprilia	Qualified in Q2	1:52.348	9	3
10	41	(Spain) Aleix Espargaró	Aprilia	Qualified in Q2	1:52.466	16 (Note: Six-place grid penalty for unsportmanlike behavior after hitting Franco Morbidelli during FP2.)	4
11	33	(South Africa) Brad Binder	KTM	Qualified in Q2	1:52.729	10	4
12	37	(Spain) Augusto Fernández	KTM	Qualified in Q2	1:52.784	11	4
13	72	(Italy) Marco Bezzecchi	Ducati	1:52.504	N/A	12	6
14	20	(France) Fabio Quartararo	Yamaha	1:52.524	N/A	13	5
15	23	(Italy) Enea Bastianini	Ducati	1:52.828	N/A	14	5
16	43	(Australia) Jack Miller	KTM	1:52.889	N/A	15	5
17	88	(Portugal) Miguel Oliveira	Aprilia	1:53.099	N/A	17	6
18	21	(Italy) Franco Morbidelli	Yamaha	1:53.143	N/A	18	6
19	44	(Spain) Pol Espargaró	KTM	1:53.362	N/A	19	7
20	36	(Spain) Joan Mir	Honda	1:53.570	N/A	20	7
21	27	(Spain) Iker Lecuona	Honda	1:53.838	N/A	22 (Note: Three-place grid penalty for riding slowly on the racing line and hindering another rider during Q1.)	7
22	30	(Japan) Takaaki Nakagami	Honda	1:54.360	N/A	21	8
OFFICIAL MOTOGP QUALIFYING RESULTS

=== Moto2 ===
Joe Roberts set the pole best time 1:57.305 and was the fastest rider at this session ahead of Celestino Vietti and Arón Canet.

=== Moto3 ===
Daniel Holgado set the pole position 2:04.742 and was the fastest rider at this session ahead of Diogo Moreira and Deniz Öncü.

== MotoGP Sprint ==
The MotoGP Sprint was held on 18 November.

Pos.	No.	Rider	Team	Constructor	Laps	Time/Retired	Grid	Points
1	89	(Spain) Jorge Martín	Prima Pramac Racing	Ducati	11	20:52.634	5	12
2	49	(Italy) Fabio Di Giannantonio	Gresini Racing MotoGP	Ducati	11	+0.391	2	9
3	10	(Italy) Luca Marini	Mooney VR46 Racing Team	Ducati	11	+2.875	1	7
4	73	(Spain) Álex Márquez	Gresini Racing MotoGP	Ducati	11	+3.370	3	6
5	1	(Italy) Francesco Bagnaia	Ducati Lenovo Team	Ducati	11	+3.957	4	5
6	12	(Spain) Maverick Viñales	Aprilia Racing	Aprilia	11	+4.239	8	4
7	33	(South Africa) Brad Binder	Red Bull KTM Factory Racing	KTM	11	+5.761	11	3
8	20	(France) Fabio Quartararo	Monster Energy Yamaha MotoGP	Yamaha	11	+6.454	14	2
9	37	(Spain) Augusto Fernández	GasGas Factory Racing Tech3	KTM	11	+8.285	12	1
10	5	(France) Johann Zarco	Prima Pramac Racing	Ducati	11	+8.314	6	
11	93	(Spain) Marc Márquez	Repsol Honda Team	Honda	11	+9.596	7	
12	43	(Australia) Jack Miller	Red Bull KTM Factory Racing	KTM	11	+10.173	16	
13	72	(Italy) Marco Bezzecchi	Mooney VR46 Racing Team	Ducati	11	+10.646	13	
14	25	(Spain) Raúl Fernández	CryptoData RNF MotoGP Team	Aprilia	11	+11.117	9	
15	21	(Italy) Franco Morbidelli	Monster Energy Yamaha MotoGP	Yamaha	11	+12.163	18	
16	44	(Spain) Pol Espargaró	GasGas Factory Racing Tech3	KTM	11	+12.745	19	
17	27	(Spain) Iker Lecuona	LCR Honda Castrol	Honda	11	+19.285	21	
18	30	(Japan) Takaaki Nakagami	LCR Honda Idemitsu	Honda	11	+26.238	22	
19	36	(Spain) Joan Mir	Repsol Honda Team	Honda	11	+28.446	20	
20	23	(Italy) Enea Bastianini	Ducati Lenovo Team	Ducati	11	+35.553	15	
Ret	41	(Spain) Aleix Espargaró	Aprilia Racing	Aprilia	1	Collision damage	10	
Ret	88	(Portugal) Miguel Oliveira	CryptoData RNF MotoGP Team	Aprilia	0	Collision	17	
Fastest sprint lap: (Spain) Jorge Martín (Ducati) – 1:53.355 (lap 6)
OFFICIAL MOTOGP SPRINT REPORT

== Warm up practice ==
=== MotoGP ===
Maverick Viñales set the best time 1:53.346 and was the fastest rider at this session ahead of Johann Zarco and Fabio Quartararo.

== Race ==
=== MotoGP ===
Pos.	No.	Rider	Team	Constructor	Laps	Time/Retired	Grid	Points
1	49	(Italy) Fabio Di Giannantonio	Gresini Racing MotoGP	Ducati	22	41:43.654	2	25
2	1	(Italy) Francesco Bagnaia	Ducati Lenovo Team	Ducati	22	+2.734	4	20
3	10	(Italy) Luca Marini	Mooney VR46 Racing Team	Ducati	22	+4.408	1	16
4	12	(Spain) Maverick Viñales	Aprilia Racing	Aprilia	22	+4.488	8	13
5	33	(South Africa) Brad Binder	Red Bull KTM Factory Racing	KTM	22	+7.246	10	11
6	73	(Spain) Álex Márquez	Gresini Racing MotoGP	Ducati	22	+7.620	3	10
7	20	(France) Fabio Quartararo	Monster Energy Yamaha MotoGP	Yamaha	22	+7.828	13	9
8	23	(Italy) Enea Bastianini	Ducati Lenovo Team	Ducati	22	+8.239	14	8
9	43	(Australia) Jack Miller	Red Bull KTM Factory Racing	KTM	22	+11.509	15	7
10	89	(Spain) Jorge Martín	Prima Pramac Racing	Ducati	22	+14.819	5	6
11	93	(Spain) Marc Márquez	Repsol Honda Team	Honda	22	+14.964	7	5
12	5	(France) Johann Zarco	Prima Pramac Racing	Ducati	22	+17.431	6	4
13	72	(Italy) Marco Bezzecchi	Mooney VR46 Racing Team	Ducati	22	+17.807	12	3
14	36	(Spain) Joan Mir	Repsol Honda Team	Honda	22	+18.673	19	2
15	37	(Spain) Augusto Fernández	GasGas Factory Racing Tech3	KTM	22	+21.455	11	1
16	21	(Italy) Franco Morbidelli	Monster Energy Yamaha MotoGP	Yamaha	22	+21.474	17	
17	25	(Spain) Raúl Fernández	CryptoData RNF MotoGP Team	Aprilia	22	+22.142	9	
18	44	(Spain) Pol Espargaró	GasGas Factory Racing Tech3	KTM	22	+27.194	18	
19	30	(Japan) Takaaki Nakagami	LCR Honda Idemitsu	Honda	22	+27.740	20	
Ret	41	(Spain) Aleix Espargaró	Aprilia Racing	Aprilia	6	Retired	16	
Ret	27	(Spain) Iker Lecuona	LCR Honda Castrol	Honda	0	Technical issue	21	
DNS	88	(Portugal) Miguel Oliveira	CryptoData RNF MotoGP Team	Aprilia		Did not start		
Fastest lap: (Italy) Enea Bastianini (Ducati) – 1:52.978 (lap 22)
OFFICIAL MOTOGP RACE REPORT

- Miguel Oliveira suffered a fractured scapula in a collision with Aleix Espargaró during the sprint and withdrew from the main race.

=== Moto2 ===
Pos.	No.	Rider	Constructor	Laps	Time/Retired	Grid	Points
1	54	(Spain) Fermín Aldeguer	Boscoscuro	18	35:32.117	4	25
2	18	(Spain) Manuel González	Kalex	18	+2.643	9	20
3	40	(Spain) Arón Canet	Kalex	18	+2.652	3	16
4	79	(Japan) Ai Ogura	Kalex	18	+4.585	12	13
5	96	(United Kingdom) Jake Dixon	Kalex	18	+4.645	6	11
6	13	(Italy) Celestino Vietti	Kalex	18	+5.936	2	10
7	35	(Thailand) Somkiat Chantra	Kalex	18	+6.212	13	9
8	37	(Spain) Pedro Acosta	Kalex	18	+6.598	7	8
9	21	(Spain) Alonso López	Boscoscuro	18	+7.269	10	7
10	14	(Italy) Tony Arbolino	Kalex	18	+11.302	11	6
11	16	(United States) Joe Roberts	Kalex	18	+11.565	1	5
12	22	(United Kingdom) Sam Lowes	Kalex	18	+11.663	5	4
13	24	(Spain) Marcos Ramírez	Kalex	18	+16.105	8	3
14	15	(South Africa) Darryn Binder	Kalex	18	+16.306	20	2
15	52	(Spain) Jeremy Alcoba	Kalex	18	+19.293	19	1
16	71	(Italy) Dennis Foggia	Kalex	18	+19.513	23	
17	11	(Spain) Sergio García	Kalex	18	+19.602	21	
18	7	(Belgium) Barry Baltus	Kalex	18	+19.968	16	
19	84	(Netherlands) Zonta van den Goorbergh	Kalex	18	+23.303	14	
20	17	(Spain) Álex Escrig	Forward	18	+25.075	15	
21	75	(Spain) Albert Arenas	Kalex	18	+28.571	22	
22	64	(Netherlands) Bo Bendsneyder	Kalex	18	+28.636	25	
23	28	(Spain) Izan Guevara	Kalex	18	+30.571	24	
24	33	(United Kingdom) Rory Skinner	Kalex	18	+32.413	29	
25	23	(Japan) Taiga Hada	Kalex	18	+35.127	28	
26	9	(Italy) Mattia Casadei	Kalex	18	+36.741	27	
Ret	5	(Japan) Kohta Nozane	Kalex	11	Accident	30	
Ret	3	(Germany) Lukas Tulovic	Kalex	7	Accident	17	
Ret	4	(United States) Sean Dylan Kelly	Forward	4	Accident	26	
DNS	12	(Czech Republic) Filip Salač	Kalex		Did not start	18	
Fastest lap: (United Kingdom) Sam Lowes (Kalex) – 1:57.366 (lap 18)
OFFICIAL MOTO2 RACE REPORT

- Filip Salač stopped with a technical issue on the sighting lap and was unable to start.

=== Moto3 ===
Pos.	No.	Rider	Constructor	Laps	Time/Retired	Grid	Points
1	5	(Spain) Jaume Masià	Honda	16	33:50.694	10	25
2	80	(Colombia) David Alonso	Gas Gas	16	+0.068	12	20
3	53	(Turkey) Deniz Öncü	KTM	16	+0.163	3	16
4	54	(Italy) Riccardo Rossi	Honda	16	+0.285	18	13
5	21	(Spain) Vicente Pérez	KTM	16	+1.553	11	11
6	71	(Japan) Ayumu Sasaki	Husqvarna	16	+1.566	4	10
7	18	(Italy) Matteo Bertelle	Honda	16	+1.725	8	9
8	27	(Japan) Kaito Toba	Honda	16	+1.846	23	8
9	96	(Spain) Daniel Holgado	KTM	16	+1.943	1	7
10	95	(Netherlands) Collin Veijer	Husqvarna	16	+2.019	5	6
11	55	(Italy) Romano Fenati	Honda	16	+3.634	6	5
12	44	(Spain) David Muñoz	KTM	16	+4.003	21	4
13	66	(Australia) Joel Kelso	CFMoto	16	+4.060	7	3
14	72	(Japan) Taiyo Furusato	Honda	16	+4.166	16	2
15	48	(Spain) Iván Ortolá	KTM	16	+4.228	9	1
16	99	(Spain) José Antonio Rueda	KTM	16	+4.707	17	
17	31	(Spain) Adrián Fernández	Honda	16	+5.139	13	
18	82	(Italy) Stefano Nepa	KTM	16	+5.221	20	
19	19	(United Kingdom) Scott Ogden	Honda	16	+5.589	15	
20	43	(Spain) Xavier Artigas	CFMoto	16	+7.934	14	
21	6	(Japan) Ryusei Yamanaka	Gas Gas	16	+8.140	24	
22	63	(Malaysia) Syarifuddin Azman	KTM	16	+22.445	22	
23	38	(Spain) David Salvador	KTM	16	+22.622	26	
24	20	(France) Lorenzo Fellon	KTM	16	+33.718	25	
25	64	(Indonesia) Mario Aji	Honda	16	+34.010	28 (Note: Back of the grid start penalty.)	
26	10	(Brazil) Diogo Moreira	KTM	16	+41.722	2	
Ret	7	(Italy) Filippo Farioli	KTM	3	Accident	27	
Ret	70	(United Kingdom) Joshua Whatley	Honda	0	Accident	19	
Fastest lap: (Japan) Ayumu Sasaki (Husqvarna) – 2:05.501 (lap 15)
OFFICIAL MOTO3 RACE REPORT

== Championship standings after the race ==
Below are the standings for the top five riders, constructors, and teams after the round.

=== MotoGP ===
Riders' Championship standings

Pos.	Rider	Points
1	(Italy) Francesco Bagnaia	437
2	(Spain) Jorge Martín	416
3	(Italy) Marco Bezzecchi	326
4	(South Africa) Brad Binder	268
5	(France) Johann Zarco	204

Constructors' Championship standings

Pos.	Constructor	Points
1	(Italy) Ducati	663
2	(Austria) KTM	348
3	(Italy) Aprilia	309
4	(Japan) Yamaha	187
5	(Japan) Honda	174

Teams' Championship standings

Pos.	Team	Points
1	(Italy) Prima Pramac Racing	620
2	(Italy) Ducati Lenovo Team	531
3	(Italy) Mooney VR46 Racing Team	520
4	(Austria) Red Bull KTM Factory Racing	431
5	(Italy) Aprilia Racing	390

=== Moto2 ===
Riders' Championship standings

Pos.	Rider	Points
1	(Spain) Pedro Acosta	328.5
2	(Italy) Tony Arbolino	249.5
3	(United Kingdom) Jake Dixon	194
4	(Spain) Fermín Aldeguer	187
5	(Spain) Arón Canet	175

Constructors' Championship standings

Pos.	Constructor	Points
1	(Germany) Kalex	442.5
2	(Italy) Boscoscuro	261
3	(Switzerland) Forward	4

Teams' Championship standings

Pos.	Team	Points
1	(Finland) Red Bull KTM Ajo	407.5
2	(Belgium) Elf Marc VDS Racing Team	344.5
3	(Italy) Beta Tools Speed Up	321
4	(Japan) Idemitsu Honda Team Asia	295
5	(Spain) Pons Wegow Los40	259

=== Moto3 ===
Riders' Championship standings

Pos.	Rider	Points
1	(Spain) Jaume Masià	271
2	(Japan) Ayumu Sasaki	243
3	(Colombia) David Alonso	225
4	(Spain) Daniel Holgado	212
5	(Turkey) Deniz Öncü	212

Constructors' Championship standings

Pos.	Constructor	Points
1	(Austria) KTM	378
2	(Japan) Honda	322
3	(Sweden) Husqvarna	282
4	(Spain) Gas Gas	250
5	(China) CFMoto	104

Teams' Championship standings

Pos.	Team	Points
1	(Germany) Liqui Moly Husqvarna Intact GP	379
2	(Luxembourg) Leopard Racing	344
3	(Finland) Red Bull KTM Ajo	323
4	(Spain) Gaviota GasGas Aspar Team	303
5	(Italy) Angeluss MTA Team	272

== Notes ==
Previous race: 2023 Malaysian Grand Prix	FIM Grand Prix World Championship; 2023 season	Next race: 2023 Valencian Grand Prix
Previous race: 2022 Qatar Grand Prix	Qatar motorcycle Grand Prix	Next race: 2024 Qatar Grand Prix
