= 2023 Valencian Community motorcycle Grand Prix =

Motorcycle races in Cheste

2023 Valencian Community Grand Prix
Race details
- Race 20 of 20 races in the 2023 Grand Prix motorcycle racing season
- Date: 26 November 2023
- Official name: Gran Premio Motul de la Comunitat Valenciana
- Location: Circuit Ricardo Tormo; Cheste, Valencia, Spain
- Course: Permanent racing facility; 4.005 km (2.489 mi)

MotoGP
Pole position
Rider	(Spain) Maverick Viñales (Note: Maverick Viñales, who set the fastest time in qualifying and started the sprint on pole, received a three-place grid penalty for the main race for not respecting the black flag with orange disk during the warm up practice. As a result, Francesco Bagnaia started the race from pole position, although Viñales was still credited with the pole position statistic.)	Aprilia
Time	1:28.931	
Fastest lap
Rider	(South Africa) Brad Binder	KTM
Time	1:30.145 on lap 3	
Podium
First	(Italy) Francesco Bagnaia	Ducati
Second	(France) Johann Zarco	Ducati
Third	(South Africa) Brad Binder	KTM

Moto2
Pole position
Rider	(Spain) Arón Canet	Kalex
Time	1:33.314	
Fastest lap
Rider	(Spain) Fermín Aldeguer	Boscoscuro
Time	1:33.665 on lap 8	
Podium
First	(Spain) Fermín Aldeguer	Boscoscuro
Second	(Spain) Arón Canet	Kalex
Third	(Spain) Alonso López	Boscoscuro

Moto3
Pole position
Rider	(Netherlands) Collin Veijer	Husqvarna
Time	1:38.311	
Fastest lap
Rider	(Colombia) David Alonso	Gas Gas
Time	1:38.438 on lap 14	
Podium
First	(Japan) Ayumu Sasaki	Husqvarna
Second	(Colombia) David Alonso	Gas Gas
Third	(Spain) Iván Ortolá	KTM

The 2023 Valencian Community motorcycle Grand Prix (officially known as the Gran Premio Motul de la Comunitat Valenciana) was the twentieth and final round of the 2023 Grand Prix motorcycle racing season. It was held at the Circuit Ricardo Tormo in Cheste on 26 November 2023.

In the MotoGP class, Francesco Bagnaia successfully defended his Riders' Championship by winning the Grand Prix and with closest title contender Jorge Martín crashing out.

In the Moto3 class, Intact GP won their first Teams' Championship.

== Practice session ==
=== MotoGP ===
==== Combined Free Practice 1-2 ====
Free Practice sessions on Friday and Saturday do not determine riders to qualify for Q2.

Fastest session lap

Pos.	No.	Biker	Constructor	Free practice times	
Pos.	No.	Biker	Constructor	FP1	FP2
1	72	(Italy) Marco Bezzecchi	Ducati	1:30.490	**1:30.167**
2	73	(Spain) Álex Márquez	Ducati	1:30.857	**1:30.186**
3	5	(France) Johann Zarco	Ducati	**1:30.191**	1:30.445
4	1	(Italy) Francesco Bagnaia	Ducati	1:30.969	**1:30.193**
5	93	(Spain) Marc Márquez	Honda	1:30.564	**1:30.213**
6	20	(France) Fabio Quartararo	Yamaha	1:30.556	**1:30.217**
7	89	(Spain) Jorge Martín	Ducati	1:30.450	**1:30.272**
8	33	(South Africa) Brad Binder	KTM	1:31.252	**1:30.274**
9	12	(Spain) Maverick Viñales	Aprilia	1:30.534	**1:30.314**
10	25	(Spain) Raúl Fernández	Aprilia	1:31.046	**1:30.330**
11	49	(Italy) Fabio Di Giannantonio	Ducati	**1:30.378**	1:30.403
12	23	(Italy) Enea Bastianini	Ducati	1:30.811	**1:30.482**
13	37	(Spain) Augusto Fernández	KTM	**1:30.567**	1:30.614
14	21	(Italy) Franco Morbidelli	Yamaha	1:31.112	**1:30.587**
15	41	(Spain) Aleix Espargaró	Aprilia	1:31.514	**1:31.600**
16	10	(Italy) Luca Marini	Ducati	1:31.297	**1:30.701**
17	43	(Australia) Jack Miller	KTM	1:30.901	**1:30.702**
18	30	(Japan) Takaaki Nakagami	Honda	1:31.443	**1:30.821**
19	44	(Spain) Pol Espargaró	KTM	**1:30.874**	1:30.891
20	42	(Spain) Álex Rins	Honda	1:31.488	**1:30.970**
21	36	(Spain) Joan Mir	Honda	**1:31.553**	
22	32	(Italy) Lorenzo Savadori	Aprilia	1:31.997	**1:31.769**
OFFICIAL MOTOGP COMBINED FREE PRACTICE TIMES REPORT

==== Practice ====
The top ten riders (written in bold) qualified for Q2.

Pos.	No.	Biker	Constructor	
Pos.	No.	Biker	Constructor	Time results
1	12	**(Spain) Maverick Viñales**	**Aprilia**	**1:29.142**
2	89	**(Spain) Jorge Martín**	**Ducati**	**1:29.289**
3	5	**(France) Johann Zarco**	**Ducati**	**1:29.296**
4	49	**(Italy) Fabio Di Giannantonio**	**Ducati**	**1:29.395**
5	72	**(Italy) Marco Bezzecchi**	**Ducati**	**1:29.396**
6	33	**(South Africa) Brad Binder**	**KTM**	**1:29.402**
7	93	**(Spain) Marc Márquez**	**Honda**	**1:29.459**
8	25	**(Spain) Raúl Fernández**	**Aprilia**	**1:29.470**
9	43	**(Australia) Jack Miller**	**KTM**	**1:29.481**
10	41	**(Spain) Aleix Espargaró**	**Aprilia**	**1:29.571**
11	23	(Italy) Enea Bastianini	Ducati	1:29.573
12	73	(Spain) Álex Márquez	Ducati	1:29.614
13	20	(France) Fabio Quartararo	Yamaha	1:29.615
14	21	(Italy) Franco Morbidelli	Yamaha	1:29.775
15	1	(Italy) Francesco Bagnaia	Ducati	1:29.801
16	30	(Japan) Takaaki Nakagami	Honda	1:30.002
17	10	(Italy) Luca Marini	Ducati	1:30.343
18	37	(Spain) Augusto Fernández	KTM	1:30.445
19	42	(Spain) Álex Rins	Honda	1:30.464
20	32	(Italy) Lorenzo Savadori	Aprilia	1:30.795
21	44	(Spain) Pol Espargaró	KTM	1.30.940
	36	(Spain) Joan Mir	Honda	NC
OFFICIAL MOTOGP PRACTICE TIMES REPORT

=== Moto2 ===
==== Combined Practice 1-2-3 ====
The top fourteen riders (written in bold) qualified for Q2.

Fastest session lap

Pos.	No.	Biker	Constructor	Free practice times		
Pos.	No.	Biker	Constructor	P1	P2	P3
1	54	(Spain) Fermín Aldeguer	Boscoscuro	1:34.185	1:33.900	**1:33.264**
2	42	(Spain) Marcos Ramírez	Kalex	1:34.399	1:34.122	**1:33.429**
3	22	(United Kingdom) Sam Lowes	Kalex	1:33.238	**1:32.686**	1:33.035
4	13	(Italy) Celestino Vietti	Kalex	1:34.838	1:33.472	**1:32.708**
5	21	(Spain) Alonso López	Boscoscuro	1:34.938	1:34.354	**1:33.751**
6	37	(Spain) Pedro Acosta	Kalex	1:34.024	**1:33.768**	**1:34.103**
7	18	(Spain) Manuel González	Kalex	1:35.182	1:34.470	**1:33.856**
8	40	(Spain) Arón Canet	Kalex	1:34.200	1:33.951	**1:33.889**
9	96	(United Kingdom) Jake Dixon	Kalex	1:34.496	1:34.004	**1:33.193**
10	71	(Italy) Dennis Foggia	Kalex	1:34.540	1:34.317	**1:33.923**
11	75	(Spain) Albert Arenas	Kalex	1:34.637	1:35.054	**1:33.956**
Source : OFFICIAL MOTO2 COMBINED PRACTICE TIMES REPORT

=== Moto3 ===
==== Combined Practice 1-2-3 ====
The top fourteen riders (written in bold) qualified for Q2.

Fastest session lap

Pos.	No.	Biker	Constructor	Practice times		
Pos.	No.	Biker	Constructor	P1	P2	P3
1	66	**(Australia) Joel Kelso**	**CFMoto**	1:40.161	1:39.080	**1:38.569**
2	71	(Japan) **Ayumu Sasaki**	**Husqvarna**	1:39.956	1:39.434	**1:38.623**
3	96	**(Spain) Daniel Holgado**	**KTM**	1:38.919	1:38.706	**1:38.669**
4	21	(Spain) **Vicente Pérez**	**KTM**	1:40.605	1:39.312	**1:38.733**
5	6	**(Japan)** **Ryusei Yamanaka**	**GasGas**	1:39.847	1:39.187	1:38.889
Source : OFFICIAL MOTO3 COMBINED PRACTICE TIMES REPORT

== Qualifying ==
=== MotoGP ===
Fastest session lap

Pos.	No.	Biker	Constructor	Qualifying times		Final grid	Row
Pos.	No.	Biker	Constructor	Q1	Q2	Final grid	Row
1	12	(Spain) Maverick Viñales	Aprilia	Qualified in Q2	1:28.931	1	1
2	1	(Italy) Francesco Bagnaia	Ducati	1:29.054	1:29.023	2	1
3	5	(France) Johann Zarco	Ducati	Qualified in Q2	1:29.144	3	1
4	43	(Australia) Jack Miller	KTM	Qualified in Q2	1:29.161	4	2
5	33	(South Africa) Brad Binder	KTM	Qualified in Q2	1:29.171	5	2
6	89	(Spain) Jorge Martín	Ducati	Qualified in Q2	1:29.182	6	2
7	72	(Italy) Marco Bezzecchi	Ducati	Qualified in Q2	1:29.223	7	3
8	73	(Spain) Álex Márquez	Ducati	1:29.196	1:29.261	8	3
9	93	(Spain) Marc Márquez	Honda	Qualified in Q2	1:29.275	9	3
10	25	(Spain) Raúl Fernández	Aprilia	Qualified in Q2	1:29.438	10	4
11	49	(Italy) Fabio Di Giannantonio	Ducati	Qualified in Q2	1:29.510	11	4
12	41	(Spain) Aleix Espargaró	Aprilia	Qualified in Q2	1:29.797	12	4
13	37	(Spain) Augusto Fernández	KTM	1:29.233	N/A	13	5
14	23	(Italy) Enea Bastianini	Ducati	1:29.389	N/A	14	6
15	20	(France) Fabio Quartararo	Yamaha	1:29.613	N/A	15	5
16	30	(Japan) Takaaki Nakagami	Honda	1:29.864	N/A	16	5
17	10	(Italy) Luca Marini	Ducati	1:29.901	N/A	17	6
18	44	(Spain) Pol Espargaró	KTM	1:29.953	N/A	18	6
19	21	(Italy) Franco Morbidelli	Yamaha	1:30.045	N/A	19	7
20	42	(Spain) Álex Rins	Honda	1:30.257	N/A	20	7
21	32	(Italy) Lorenzo Savadori	Aprilia	1:31.044	N/A	21	7
OFFICIAL MOTOGP QUALIFYING RESULTS

=== Moto2 ===
Fastest session lap

Pos.	No.	Biker	Constructor	Qualifying times		Final grid	Row
Pos.	No.	Biker	Constructor	Q1	Q2	Final grid	Row
1	40	(Spain) Arón Canet	Kalex	Qualified in Q2	1:33.314	1	1
2	54	(Spain) Fermín Aldeguer	Boscoscuro	Qualified in Q2	1:33.488	2	1
3	42	(Spain) Marcos Ramírez	Kalex	Qualified in Q2	1:33.508	3	1
4	22	(United Kingdom) Sam Lowes	Kalex	Qualified in Q2	1:33.573	4	2
5	96	(United Kingdom) Jake Dixon	Kalex	Qualified in Q2	1:33.648	5	2
6	37	(Spain) Pedro Acosta	Kalex	Qualified in Q2	1:33.762	6	2
7	16	(United States) Joe Roberts	Kalex	1:33.944	1:33.773	7	3
OFFICIAL MOTOGP QUALIFYING RESULTS							3

=== Moto3 ===
Collin Veijer set the pole position 1:38.311 and was the fastest rider at this session ahead of Ayumu Sasaki and Deniz Öncü.

== MotoGP Sprint ==
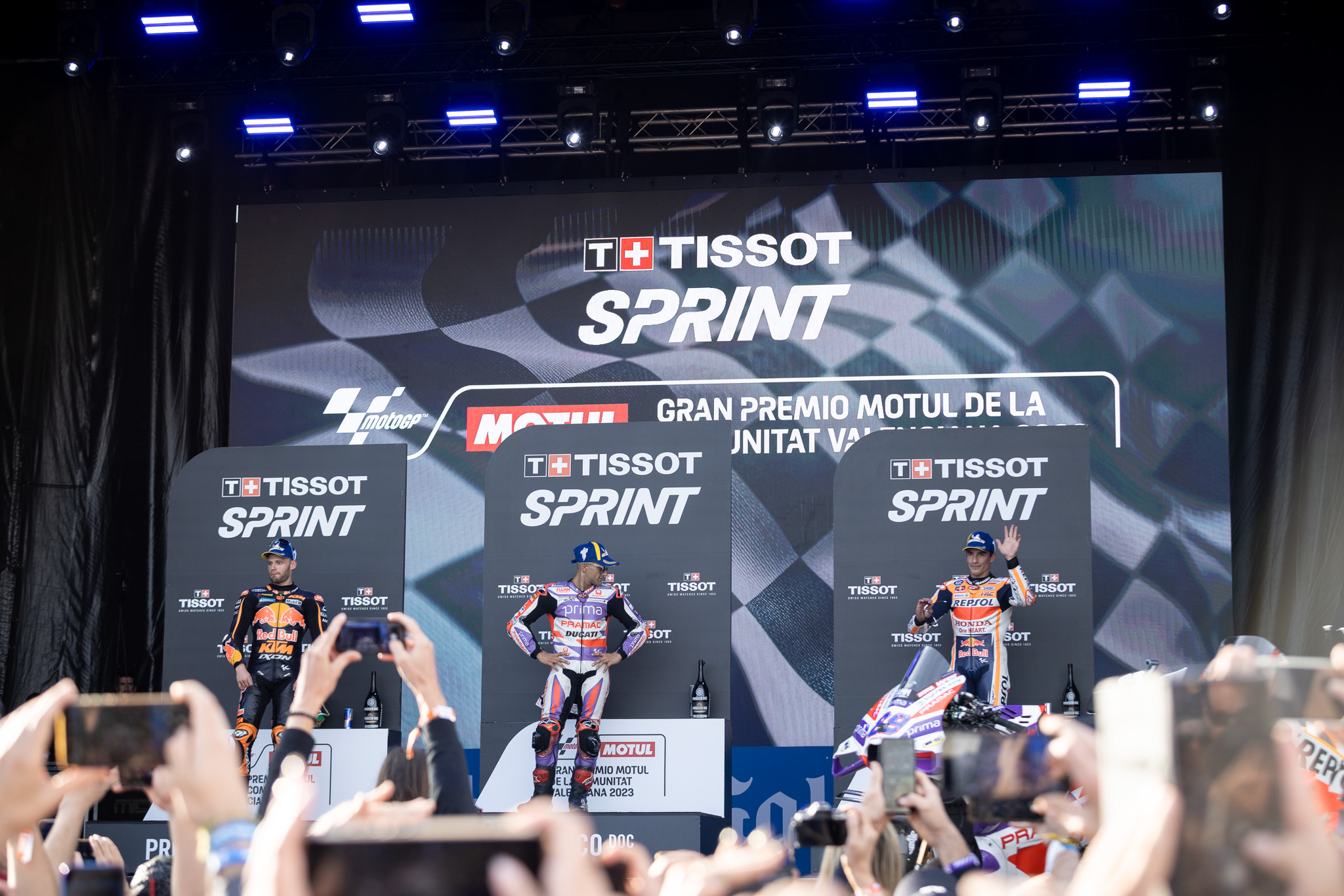
Podium finishers of the sprint

The MotoGP Sprint was held on 25 November.

Pos.	No.	Rider	Team	Constructor	Laps	Time/Retired	Grid	Points
1	89	(Spain) Jorge Martín	Prima Pramac Racing	Ducati	13	19:38.827	6	12
2	33	(South Africa) Brad Binder	Red Bull KTM Factory Racing	KTM	13	+0.190	5	9
3	93	(Spain) Marc Márquez	Repsol Honda Team	Honda	13	+2.122	9	7
4	12	(Spain) Maverick Viñales	Aprilia Racing	Aprilia	13	+3.106	1	6
5	1	(Italy) Francesco Bagnaia	Ducati Lenovo Team	Ducati	13	+4.253	2	5
6	49	(Italy) Fabio Di Giannantonio	Gresini Racing MotoGP	Ducati	13	+4.400	11	4
7	72	(Italy) Marco Bezzecchi	Mooney VR46 Racing Team	Ducati	13	+4.502	7	3
8	73	(Spain) Álex Márquez	Gresini Racing MotoGP	Ducati	13	+5.578	8	2
9	5	(France) Johann Zarco	Prima Pramac Racing	Ducati	13	+5.910	3	1
10	37	(Spain) Augusto Fernández	GasGas Factory Racing Tech3	KTM	13	+6.095	13	
11	25	(Spain) Raúl Fernández	CryptoData RNF MotoGP Team	Aprilia	13	+7.674	10	
12	43	(Australia) Jack Miller	Red Bull KTM Factory Racing	KTM	13	+8.098	4	
13	41	(Spain) Aleix Espargaró	Aprilia Racing	Aprilia	13	+9.513	12	
14	44	(Spain) Pol Espargaró	GasGas Factory Racing Tech3	KTM	13	+12.453	18	
15	23	(Italy) Enea Bastianini	Ducati Lenovo Team	Ducati	13	+12.599	14	
16	30	(Japan) Takaaki Nakagami	LCR Honda Idemitsu	Honda	13	+13.787	16	
17	10	(Italy) Luca Marini	Mooney VR46 Racing Team	Ducati	13	+13.887 (Note: Three-second penalty for spending more than one third of the race distance under the minimum tyre pressure.)	17	
18	21	(Italy) Franco Morbidelli	Monster Energy Yamaha MotoGP	Yamaha	13	+14.943	19	
19	42	(Spain) Álex Rins	LCR Honda Castrol	Honda	13	+20.378	20	
20	32	(Italy) Lorenzo Savadori	CryptoData RNF MotoGP Team	Aprilia	13	+25.017	21	
Ret	20	(France) Fabio Quartararo	Monster Energy Yamaha MotoGP	Yamaha	4	Accident	15	
DNS	36	(Spain) Joan Mir	Repsol Honda Team	Honda		Did not start		
Fastest sprint lap: (Spain) Marc Márquez (Honda) – 1:29.809 (lap 4)
OFFICIAL MOTOGP SPRINT REPORT

- Joan Mir was declared unfit due to neck pain from a crash in Free Practice 1 and withdrew from the rest of the weekend.

== Warm up practice ==
=== MotoGP ===
Johann Zarco set the best time 1:29.984 and was the fastest rider at this session ahead of Brad Binder and Jorge Martín.

== Race ==
=== MotoGP ===
Pos.	No.	Rider	Team	Constructor	Laps	Time/Retired	Grid	Points
1	1	(Italy) Francesco Bagnaia	Ducati Lenovo Team	Ducati	27	40:58.535	1	25
2	5	(France) Johann Zarco	Prima Pramac Racing	Ducati	27	+0.360	2	20
3	33	(South Africa) Brad Binder	Red Bull KTM Factory Racing	KTM	27	+2.347	5	16
4	49	(Italy) Fabio Di Giannantonio	Gresini Racing MotoGP	Ducati	27	+3.176 (Note: Three-second penalty for spending more than half of the race distance under the minimum tyre pressure.)	11	13
5	25	(Spain) Raúl Fernández	CryptoData RNF MotoGP Team	Aprilia	27	+4.636	10	11
6	73	(Spain) Álex Márquez	Gresini Racing MotoGP	Ducati	27	+4.708	8	10
7	21	(Italy) Franco Morbidelli	Monster Energy Yamaha MotoGP	Yamaha	27	+4.736	19	9
8	41	(Spain) Aleix Espargaró	Aprilia Racing	Aprilia	27	+8.014	12	8
9	10	(Italy) Luca Marini	Mooney VR46 Racing Team	Ducati	27	+9.486	17	7
10	12	(Spain) Maverick Viñales	Aprilia Racing	Aprilia	27	+10.556	4	6
11	20	(France) Fabio Quartararo	Monster Energy Yamaha MotoGP	Yamaha	27	+12.001	15	5
12	30	(Japan) Takaaki Nakagami	LCR Honda Idemitsu	Honda	27	+21.695	16	4
13	32	(Italy) Lorenzo Savadori	CryptoData RNF MotoGP Team	Aprilia	27	+43.297	21	3
14	44	(Spain) Pol Espargaró	GasGas Factory Racing Tech3	KTM	25	+2 laps	18	2
Ret	42	(Spain) Álex Rins	LCR Honda Castrol	Honda	19	Accident	20	
Ret	43	(Australia) Jack Miller	Red Bull KTM Factory Racing	KTM	18	Accident	3	
Ret	23	(Italy) Enea Bastianini	Ducati Lenovo Team	Ducati	9	Accident	14	
Ret	37	(Spain) Augusto Fernández	GasGas Factory Racing Tech3	KTM	9	Accident	13	
Ret	93	(Spain) Marc Márquez	Repsol Honda Team	Honda	5	Collision	9	
Ret	89	(Spain) Jorge Martín	Prima Pramac Racing	Ducati	5	Collision	6	
Ret	72	(Italy) Marco Bezzecchi	Mooney VR46 Racing Team	Ducati	0	Accident	7	
DNS	36	(Spain) Joan Mir	Repsol Honda Team	Honda		Did not start		
Fastest lap: (South Africa) Brad Binder (KTM) – 1:30.145 (lap 3)
OFFICIAL MOTOGP RACE REPORT

=== Moto2 ===
Pos.	No.	Rider	Constructor	Laps	Time/Retired	Grid	Points
1	54	(Spain) Fermín Aldeguer	Boscoscuro	22	34:33.384	2	25
2	40	(Spain) Arón Canet	Kalex	22	+3.986	1	20
3	21	(Spain) Alonso López	Boscoscuro	22	+6.455	14	16
4	24	(Spain) Marcos Ramírez	Kalex	22	+6.476	3	13
5	35	(Thailand) Somkiat Chantra	Kalex	22	+7.060	10	11
6	96	(United Kingdom) Jake Dixon	Kalex	22	+7.864	5	10
7	22	(United Kingdom) Sam Lowes	Kalex	22	+8.924	4	9
8	16	(United States) Joe Roberts	Kalex	22	+11.842	7	8
9	71	(Italy) Dennis Foggia	Kalex	22	+12.096	12	7
10	75	(Spain) Albert Arenas	Kalex	22	+12.549	9	6
11	79	(Japan) Ai Ogura	Kalex	22	+13.527	17	5
12	37	(Spain) Pedro Acosta	Kalex	22	+14.044	6	4
13	18	(Spain) Manuel González	Kalex	22	+15.570	18	3
14	7	(Belgium) Barry Baltus	Kalex	22	+15.861	16	2
15	52	(Spain) Jeremy Alcoba	Kalex	22	+18.539	23	1
16	14	(Italy) Tony Arbolino	Kalex	22	+18.608	19	
17	12	(Czech Republic) Filip Salač	Kalex	22	+25.356	8	
18	84	(Netherlands) Zonta van den Goorbergh	Kalex	22	+26.716	20	
19	44	(Italy) Matteo Ferrari	Kalex	22	+31.074	24	
20	15	(South Africa) Darryn Binder	Kalex	22	+33.307	25	
21	33	(United Kingdom) Rory Skinner	Kalex	22	+35.853	26	
22	23	(Japan) Taiga Hada	Kalex	22	+36.352	29	
23	17	(Spain) Álex Escrig	Forward	22	+36.955	22	
24	64	(Netherlands) Bo Bendsneyder	Kalex	22	+41.137	27	
25	9	(Italy) Mattia Casadei	Kalex	22	+42.309	30	
26	4	(United States) Sean Dylan Kelly	Forward	22	+55.828	32	
Ret	45	(Spain) Héctor Garzó	NTS	16	Accident	28	
Ret	13	(Italy) Celestino Vietti	Kalex	6	Accident damage	11	
Ret	3	(Germany) Lukas Tulovic	Kalex	4	Accident	21	
Ret	11	(Spain) Sergio García	Kalex	0	Accident	13	
Ret	28	(Spain) Izan Guevara	Kalex	0	Accident	15	
Ret	5	(Japan) Kohta Nozane	Kalex	0	Accident	31	
Fastest lap: (Spain) Fermín Aldeguer (Boscoscuro) – 1:33.665 (lap 8)
OFFICIAL MOTO2 RACE REPORT

=== Moto3 ===
Pos.	No.	Rider	Constructor	Laps	Time/Retired	Grid	Points
1	71	(Japan) Ayumu Sasaki	Husqvarna	20	33:03.409	2	25
2	80	(Colombia) David Alonso	Gas Gas	20	+0.082	5	20
3	48	(Spain) Iván Ortolá	KTM	20	+0.128	6	16
4	95	(Netherlands) Collin Veijer	Husqvarna	20	+0.266	1	13
5	53	(Turkey) Deniz Öncü	KTM	20	+0.384	3	11
6	99	(Spain) José Antonio Rueda	KTM	20	+3.589	7	10
7	66	(Australia) Joel Kelso	CFMoto	20	+4.623	4	9
8	96	(Spain) Daniel Holgado	KTM	20	+6.105	18	8
9	44	(Spain) David Muñoz	KTM	20	+6.305	9	7
10	6	(Japan) Ryusei Yamanaka	Gas Gas	20	+6.907	10	6
11	72	(Japan) Taiyo Furusato	Honda	20	+9.166	16	5
12	7	(Italy) Filippo Farioli	KTM	20	+9.663	14	4
13	5	(Spain) Jaume Masià	Honda	20	+10.446	8	3
14	31	(Spain) Adrián Fernández	Honda	20	+10.556	12	2
15	82	(Italy) Stefano Nepa	KTM	20	+11.462	11	1
16	55	(Italy) Romano Fenati	Honda	20	+13.966	20	
17	54	(Italy) Riccardo Rossi	Honda	20	+14.000	15	
18	18	(Italy) Matteo Bertelle	Honda	20	+25.472	19	
19	43	(Spain) Xavier Artigas	CFMoto	20	+28.354	22	
20	27	(Japan) Kaito Toba	Honda	20	+28.420	21	
21	38	(Spain) David Salvador	KTM	20	+33.908	23	
22	69	(Spain) Marcos Ruda	Husqvarna	20	+36.632	25	
23	64	(Indonesia) Mario Aji	Honda	20	+36.785	26	
Ret	20	(France) Lorenzo Fellon	KTM	2	Accident	24	
Ret	21	(Spain) Vicente Pérez	KTM	0	Accident	13	
Ret	10	(Brazil) Diogo Moreira	KTM	0	Accident	17	
DNS	63	(Malaysia) Syarifuddin Azman	KTM		Did not start		
DNS	19	(United Kingdom) Scott Ogden	Honda		Did not start		
WD	92	(Spain) David Almansa	Husqvarna		Withdrew		
Fastest lap: (Colombia) David Alonso (Gas Gas) – 1:38.438 (lap 14)
OFFICIAL MOTO3 RACE REPORT

- Syarifuddin Azman suffered a fractured right wrist from a crash in Practice 2 and withdrew from the weekend.
- Scott Ogden suffered a dislocated shoulder from a crash in Practice 3 and withdrew from the weekend.
- David Almansa was entered as a wildcard, but suffered an injury in Practice 1 and was replaced for the rest of the weekend by Marcos Ruda.

== Championship standings after the race ==
Below are the standings for the top five riders, constructors, and teams after the round.

=== MotoGP ===
Riders' Championship standings

Pos.	Rider	Points
1	(Italy) Francesco Bagnaia	467
2	(Spain) Jorge Martín	428
3	(Italy) Marco Bezzecchi	329
4	(South Africa) Brad Binder	293
5	(France) Johann Zarco	225

Constructors' Championship standings

Pos.	Constructor	Points
1	(Italy) Ducati	700
2	(Austria) KTM	373
3	(Italy) Aprilia	326
4	(Japan) Yamaha	196
5	(Japan) Honda	185

Teams' Championship standings

Pos.	Team	Points
1	(Italy) Prima Pramac Racing	653
2	(Italy) Ducati Lenovo Team	561
3	(Italy) Mooney VR46 Racing Team	530
4	(Austria) Red Bull KTM Factory Racing	456
5	(Italy) Aprilia Racing	410

=== Moto2 ===
Riders' Championship standings

	Pos.	Rider	Points
	1	(Spain) Pedro Acosta	332.5
	2	(Italy) Tony Arbolino	249.5
1	3	(Spain) Fermín Aldeguer	212
1	4	(United Kingdom) Jake Dixon	204
	5	(Spain) Arón Canet	195

Constructors' Championship standings

Pos.	Constructor	Points
1	(Germany) Kalex	462.5
2	(Italy) Boscoscuro	286
3	(Switzerland) Forward	4

Teams' Championship standings

	Pos.	Team	Points
	1	(Finland) Red Bull KTM Ajo	417.5
1	2	(Italy) CAG Speed Up	362
1	3	(Belgium) Elf Marc VDS Racing Team	353.5
	4	(Japan) Idemitsu Honda Team Asia	311
	5	(Spain) Pons Wegow Los40	279

=== Moto3 ===
Riders' Championship standings

	Pos.	Rider	Points
	1	(Spain) Jaume Masià	274
	2	(Japan) Ayumu Sasaki	268
	3	(Colombia) David Alonso	245
1	4	(Turkey) Deniz Öncü	223
1	5	(Spain) Daniel Holgado	220

Constructors' Championship standings

Pos.	Constructor	Points
1	(Austria) KTM	394
2	(Japan) Honda	327
3	(Sweden) Husqvarna	307
4	(Spain) Gas Gas	270
5	(China) CFMoto	113

Teams' Championship standings

Pos.	Team	Points
1	(Germany) Liqui Moly Husqvarna Intact GP	417
2	(Luxembourg) Leopard Racing	349
3	(Finland) Red Bull KTM Ajo	344
4	(Spain) Valresa GasGas Aspar Team	329
5	(Italy) Angeluss MTA Team	289

== Notes ==
Previous race: 2023 Qatar Grand Prix	FIM Grand Prix World Championship; 2023 season	Next race: 2024 Qatar Grand Prix
Previous race: 2022 Valencian Grand Prix	Valencian Community motorcycle Grand Prix	Next race: 2025 Valencian Grand Prix
