= Jorge Martín =

Spanish motorcycle racer (born 1998)

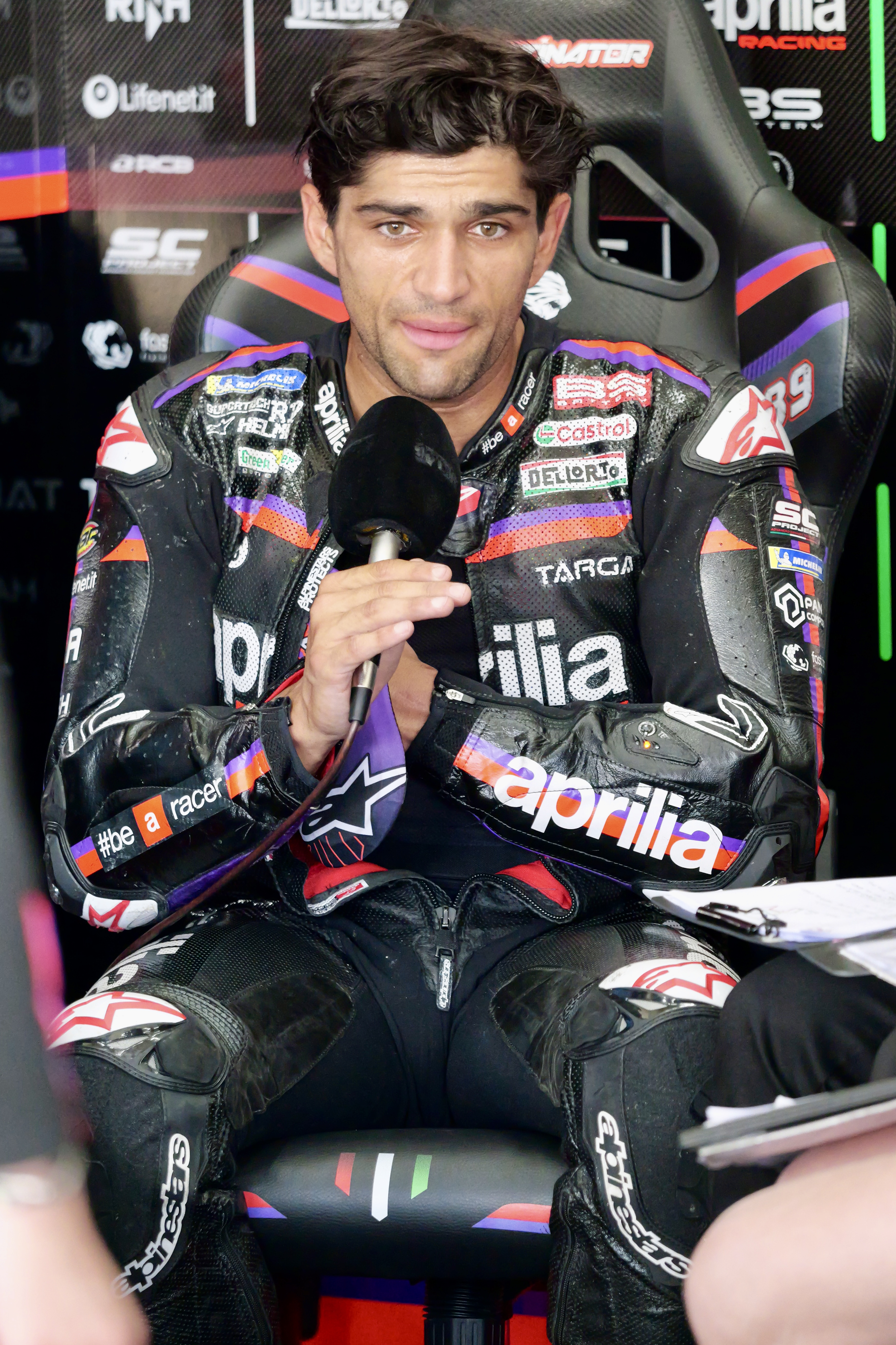
- Martín at the 2026 Spanish Grand Prix
- Nationality: Spanish
- Born: 29 January 1998 (age 28); Madrid, Spain
- Current team: Aprilia Racing
- Bike number: 89
Motorcycle racing career statistics
MotoGP World Championship
Active years	2021–
Manufacturers	Ducati (2021–2024); Aprilia (2025–)
Championships	1 (2024)
2025 championship position	21st (34 pts)
Starts / Wins / Podiums / Poles / F. laps / Points; 98 / 9 / 41 / 24 / 6 / 1588
Moto2 World Championship
Active years	2019–2020
Manufacturers	KTM (2019); Kalex (2020)
Championships	0
2020 championship position	5th (160 pts)
Starts / Wins / Podiums / Poles / F. laps / Points; 32 / 2 / 8 / 1 / 3 / 254
Moto3 World Championship
Active years	2015–2018
Manufacturers	Mahindra (2015–2016); Honda (2017–2018)
Championships	1 (2018)
2018 championship position	1st (260 pts)
Starts / Wins / Podiums / Poles / F. laps / Points; 67 / 8 / 20 / 20 / 5 / 573

Jorge Martín Almoguera (born 29 January 1998), nicknamed Martinator, is a Spanish Grand Prix motorcycle racer, who rides for Aprilia Racing. He won the 2024 MotoGP World Championship with Prima Pramac Racing, becoming the first independent team rider to win the premier class title in the MotoGP era.

After winning the 2014 Red Bull MotoGP Rookies Cup, Martín moved to the Moto3 class the following year, winning the title in 2018 with Gresini Racing. He spent two years in Moto2 before moving to the premier class with Prima Pramac Racing in 2021. Martin won the Styrian Grand Prix during his first season in MotoGP, ending his rookie year with four pole positions. He finished runner-up to Francesco Bagnaia in the World Riders' Championship in 2023, but won the MotoGP title the following year.

== Career ==
=== Moto3 World Championship ===
==== Mapfre Team Mahindra (2015) ====
In 2015, Martín made his full-time Grand Prix debut in the Moto3 World Championship with Mapfre Team Mahindra, riding a Mahindra alongside Francesco Bagnaia and Juanfran Guevara. His best result was a seventh place in Aragon, and managed to score 45 points in his rookie season.

==== Pull & Bear Aspar Mahindra Team (2016) ====
Martín remained with the same team for the 2016 Moto3 World Championship. His first-ever Grand Prix podium came in the rain-affected Czech Grand Prix, where he finished second. He closed the season 16th in the standings, scoring 72 points.

==== Del Conca Gresini Moto3 (2017–2018) ====
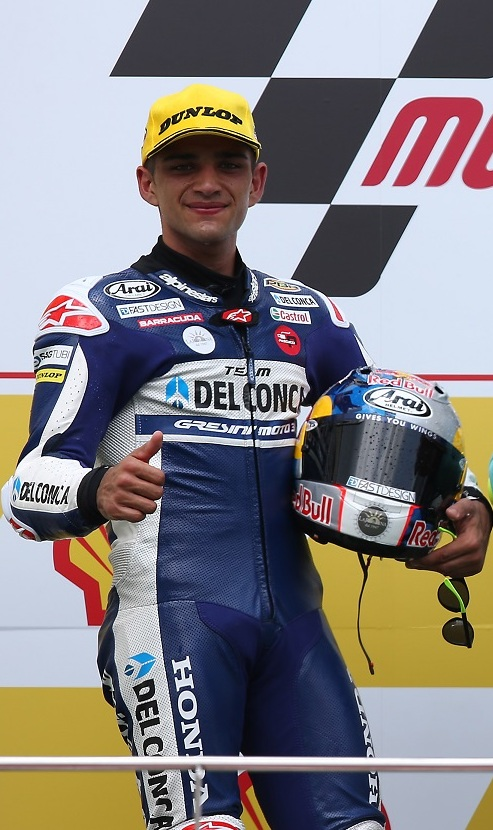
Martín in 2017

In 2017 Martín moved to the Del Conca Gresini Racing team. His teammate was Fabio Di Giannantonio. He started the season finishing on the podium in the first three races, with two third places in Qatar and Argentina, and a second place in the USA. In the middle of the year, Martín grabbed three more third places in Barcelona, Austria, and Silverstone, before finishing the season as he started it. In the three last races, he finished third in Australia, second in Malaysia, and achieved his first victory of the category in the last race at Valencia. Martín secured nine pole positions during the season (Qatar, France, Italy, Barcelona, Holland, Aragon, Australia, and Valencia). He finished the season in fourth place with 196 points, despite missing the Czech Grand Prix at the Brno circuit due to an injury sustained in the preceding round.

In 2018, Martín became the world champion in the Moto3 class. He had seven wins (Qatar, America, Italy, The Netherlands, Germany, Aragon, and Malaysia), two second places in San Marino and Valencia, a third place in Austria, and eleven pole positions.

Martín earned 260 championship points, 42 more than teammate Fabio Di Giannantonio, who finished runner-up in the championship. Martín was again forced to miss the Czech Grand Prix, due to a fracture of the left radius, remedied in free practice.

=== Moto2 World Championship ===
==== Red Bull KTM Ajo (2019–2020) ====
As champion, Martín moved up a category for the 2019 Moto2 World Championship, riding for the Red Bull KTM Ajo Motorsport team. He collected a third place in Japan, and a second place in Australia, ending the season in 11th place with 94 points.

===== 2020 =====
In 2020, Martín continued with the Ajo team, which transitioned to using Kalex bikes that season. He secured pole position and finished third at the second race of the season in Jerez. Martín claimed his first Moto2 victory at the Austrian Grand Prix and followed it with a second-place finish at the Styrian Grand Prix the next weekend. However, on 10 September 2020, Martín tested positive for COVID-19, forcing him to miss the next two rounds at Rimini and Misano. After recovering, he concluded the season with a third-place finish in Aragón, a second place in the first Valencian race, and a victory in the second Valencian race. Martín achieved six podium finishes - two each in first, second, and third places - along with one pole position and 160 points, ultimately ranking fifth in the championship standings.

=== MotoGP World Championship ===
==== Pramac Racing (2021–2024) ====
===== 2021 =====
Martín joined the premier class with Pramac Racing Ducati, alongside Johann Zarco who moved from Esponsorama, for the 2021 season. Martín started with finishing 15th in his first race of the premier class, then scored a pole position in the second round of the year in Qatar, finishing the race in third place, and scoring his first MotoGP podium. Unfortunately, he had a serious accident during the practice before the 2021 Portuguese Grand Prix, and was forced to miss the Portuguese, Spanish, French and Italian races, being replaced for the first two rounds by Tito Rabat, and the latter two by Michele Pirro. Martín was originally meant to return for the Italian Grand Prix, but due to advise by doctors he forwent the race. He made a full return in the Catalan Grand Prix, finishing 14th, before a 12th place finish at the German Grand Prix, and a retirement at the Dutch GP, after he was having physical issues with his biceps and also having tendinitis. At the Styrian GP, Martín took his second pole position, and following a red flag incident, he took his maiden MotoGP win in the re-started race. With this victory, he earned Pramac Racing's first ever MotoGP victory, and became just the third rider in the modern 1000cc era, to win a race in his rookie season, after Marc Márquez in 2013, and Brad Binder in 2020. The very next weekend, he grabbed his third pole position of the season in Austria, and his third podium too, finishing the race in third. In the season closer at Valencia, Martín scored his fourth pole position, and his fourth podium, finishing the race in second place. When on pole position, he never finished off the podium, collecting 111 points, enough for ninth in the championship, and won rookie of the year by nine points over Enea Bastianini.

===== 2022 =====
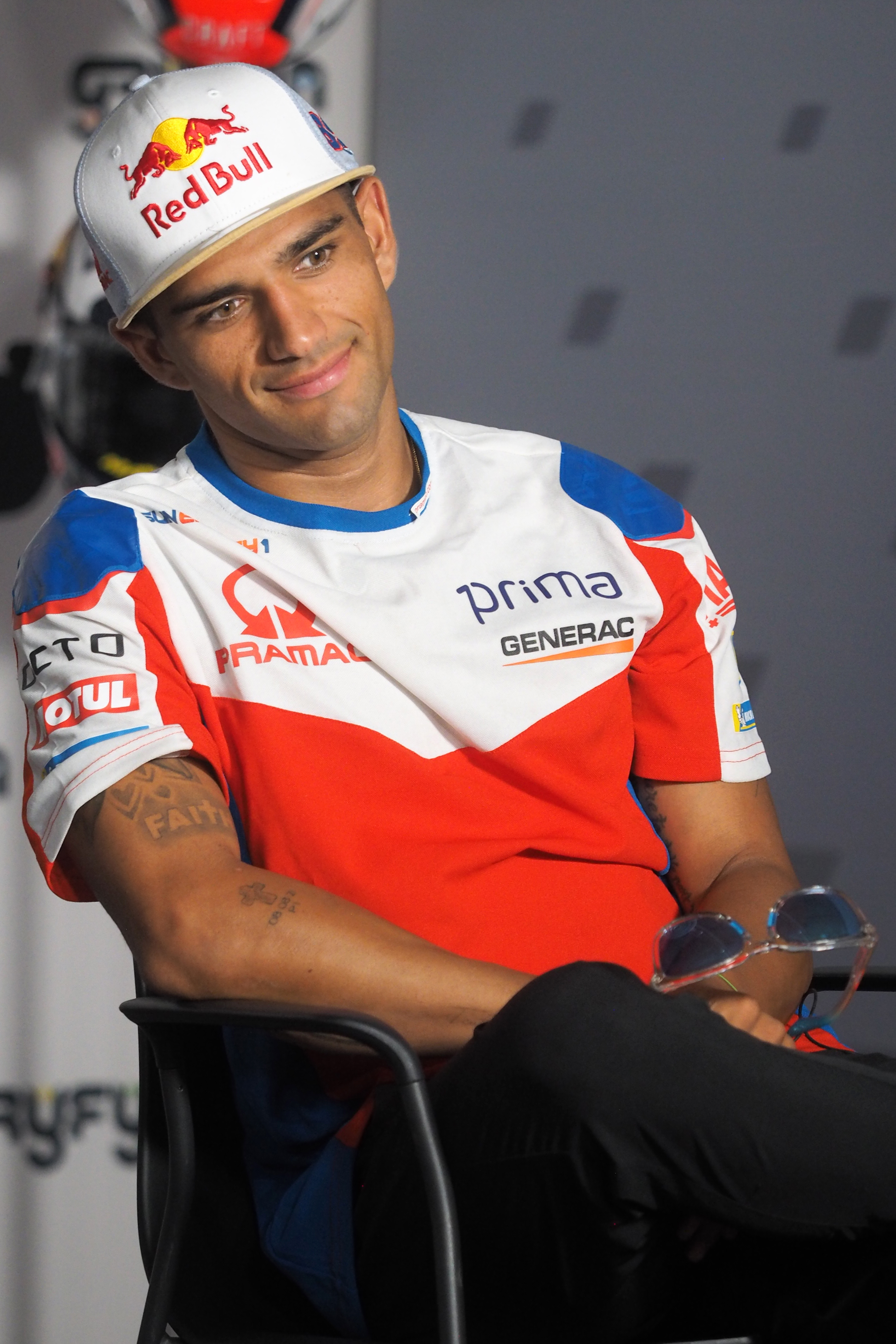
Martín at the 2022 San Marino Grand Prix

Martín and Zarco remained with Pramac Racing for the 2022 MotoGP season. At the Australian Grand Prix, Martín took pole, and broke the all-time lap at the Phillip Island Grand Prix Circuit. He also seized pole position in Qatar, America, Malaysia, and Valencia. Ending the season with ninth place, Martín scored podiums in Argentina, Barcelona, Japan, and Valencia. However, Martín was still overlooked for a factory Ducati ride in 2023, as Enea Bastianini who finished an impressive third in the championship was promoted to the factory team.

===== 2023 =====
Pramac Racing retained Martín and Zarco for the 2023 MotoGP World Championship.

Over the early and middle phases of the season, Martín established himself as a firm championship contender, along with world champion Francesco Bagnaia and Marco Bezzecchi after wins in Germany and San Marino. Said championship challenge was strengthened by championship leader Bagnaia's crash at the Indian Grand Prix, after which Martín only trailed the championship lead by 13 points. Martín briefly took the championship lead after the sprint race at the Indonesian Grand Prix, but the lead was ceded back to Bagnaia after he crashed out of the lead of the main race, which was eventually won by Bagnaia. For the rest of the season, Martín remained a challenger for the championship until the final round, and his crash in the main race at the Valencian Community Grand Prix officially ended his championship challenge. Ultimately, Martín finished 39 points behind Bagnaia, placing him a personal-best second in the riders' championship.

==== 2024 ====
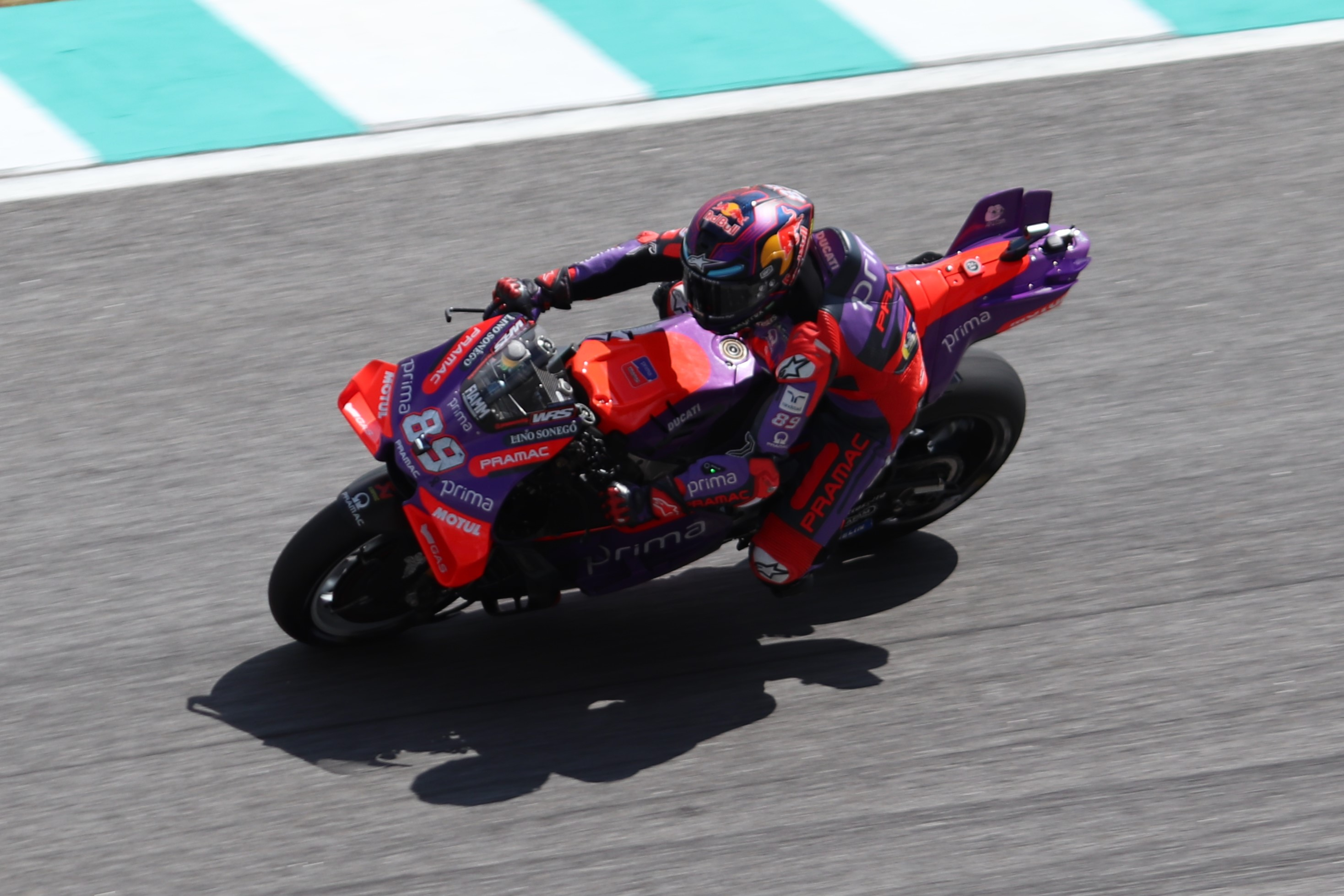
Martín at the 2024 Malaysian Grand Prix

For most of 2024, Martín remained a consistent challenger for the world championship title. He only finished off the feature race podium four times in 20 races, and the sprint podium three times. Although chief rival Bagnaia won 11 feature races, Martín's consistency would keep him as the main obstacle to Bagnaia's charge for a third successive world title. This was complemented by main race victories in Portugal, France, and Indonesia, and seven sprint race wins.

Although Bagnaia completed a perfect weekend in Barcelona, winning both the sprint and Grand Prix from pole position, but two third places for Martín were sufficient to crown him as the 2024 champion, with 508 points to Bagnaia's 498. Ducati completed the season with 722 points out of a possible maximum of 740 (97.6%) to win the constructor's championship. Martín's 2024 championship season marked him as the first satellite rider to win the riders' championship since Valentino Rossi in 2001, and the first in the MotoGP era of the premier class.

The title was decided at the season-ending round in Barcelona, where Martín finished third in both the sprint race and the Grand Prix to secure the championship.

==== Aprilia Racing (2025–2026) ====
Having been overlooked in favour of Marc Márquez for the second Ducati seat alongside Francesco Bagnaia, Martín confirmed his move to fellow Italian factory team Aprilia Racing, after the Mugello round, on a two-year deal. He replaced his mentor and long time friend Aleix Espargaró who announced his retirement from Grand Prix racing at the Catalan Grand Prix.

===== 2025 =====
In the early laps of day 1 of pre-season testing Martin had two separate accidents, the second of which caused fractures in his left foot and a fracture in his right hand that required surgery and caused him to miss the rest of pre-season testing. While recovering and preparing for the first race of the season, Martín had a separate crash in training that caused fractures to his left hand and required an additional surgery. The multiple procedures and recovery required him to miss the season's opening three rounds in Thailand, Argentine and the Americas. He was replaced at those races by Aprilia test rider Lorenzo Savadori. Martin returned at the race in Qatar after being cleared by a medical official.

Jorge Martín started his first race of the 2025 season at the Qatar GP, after missing the first three races. However, on lap 14, he lost control while manoeuvring through a corner and was subsequently struck by another rider’s bike. As a result, he suffered a fractured rib and a pneumothorax. Further medical evaluation revealed 11 fractured ribs and a developing hemopneumothorax, requiring chest drainage and hospitalization. He was forced to remain in Qatar under observation until his condition improved enough to fly home.

In the wake of the Le Mans weekend, Martín announced his intention to leave Aprilia at the end of the 2025 season, a year before the expiration of his contract. The decision came due to a performance-related break clause in Martín's contract that meant if Martín was not in the title fight (which he naturally was not having missed all races bar Qatar through injury), he had the right to leave. Martín stated he was "open to dialogue with Aprilia to extend this period to a certain number of Grand Prix after my return to competition", but that he needed to "look ahead with clarity", suggesting he had not been able to agree a set number of races with Aprilia.

After a lengthy absence due to injury, Martín finally underwent a private test on the Aprilia RS-GP at the Misano Circuit on Wednesday, July 9, 2025. This marked a significant step towards the 2024 MotoGP world champion's return to the track. Regulation Changes Pave the Way for Private Tests. Previously, regular riders were prohibited from participating in private tests mid-season, except for official test sessions. Only test riders were permitted to participate in such sessions. However, the rule change proposed by Aprilia some time ago was finally approved.

In the run up to his return to racing at round 12 in Brno, Martín reversed this decision, announcing he would stay with Aprilia for 2026. This may in part have been influenced by the fact he would not be able to be registered as an entry at another team while in a legal dispute with Aprilia (the heavily rumoured team was Honda HRC Castrol). Equally, Marco Bezzecchi's strong results that included a victory in Silverstone and a second place in Assen bolstered general perception of the 2025 RS-GP motorcycle. He officially confirmed to the press his intentions in the Thursday afternoon press conference. He finished seventh in the main race after qualifying 12th.

===== 2026 =====
Martín would start the 2026 season with a fifth place in the Thailand sprint followed by a fourth in main race. At the following race in Brazil, he achieved his first podium for Aprilia with third place in the sprint, and then followed that up with second in the main race behind teammate Marco Bezzecchi to make it an Aprilia 1-2. At the third round at the Circuit Of the Americas in Austin, Martín would go on to win the sprint and in doing to become the championship leader for the first time since his title winning 2024 season.

At the French GP, Martín won both the Saturday's sprint race and Sunday's main race, marking his first Grand Prix motorcycle racing victory since the 2024 Indonesian Grand Prix. This also marked his second win at Le Mans in three years having won the 2024 French Grand Prix. He took his first pole for Aprilia at the Dutch Grand Prix, and his first since the 2024 Australian Grand Prix. Martin retook the lead of the championship after teammate Bezzecchi's crash in the main race.

After the summer break, Martín would take his second sprint win at Silverstone as well as pole position for the main race. He went on to finish second behind the Trackhouse Aprilia of Raul Fernández, increasing his lead in the championship to 31 points.

==== Yamaha Factory Racing (2027–) ====
On 1 July 2026, it was announced that Martín would be joining the Yamaha factory team for 2027 alongside Ai Ogura.

== Personal life ==
Since 2023, Martín has been in a relationship with María Monfort, granddaughter of Spanish politician Abel Matutes, Minister of Foreign Affairs between 1996 and 2000.

== Career statistics ==
=== Red Bull MotoGP Rookies Cup ===
==== Races by year ====
(key) (Races in bold indicate pole position, races in italics indicate fastest lap)

Year	1	2	3	4	5	6	7	8	9	10	11	12	13	14	15	Pos	Pts
2012	SPA1; Ret	SPA2; 12	POR1; 12	POR2; 6	GBR1; 6	GBR2; 11	NED1; 10	NED2; 6	GER1; 19	GER2; 8	CZE1; 6	CZE2; Ret	RSM	ARA1; 7	ARA2; 10	12th	82
2013	AME1; 7	AME2; 6	JER1; 1	JER2; 4	ASS1; 2	ASS2; 3	**SAC1**; 1	**SAC2**; Ret	BRN; 3	SIL1; Ret	SIL2; 12	MIS; 9	ARA1; 7	ARA2; 7		2nd	163
2014	JER1; 2	JER2; 3	**MUG**; 1	ASS1; 2	ASS2; 2	SAC1; 12	SAC2; 1	BRN1; 1	BRN2; Ret	**SIL1**; 1	**SIL2**; 1	**MIS**; 5	**ARA1**; 4	**ARA2**; 1		1st	254

=== FIM CEV Moto3 Junior World Championship ===
==== Races by year ====
(key) (Races in bold indicate pole position, races in italics indicate fastest lap)

Year	Bike	1	2	3	4	5	6	7	8	9	10	11	Pos	Pts
2014	Mahindra	JER1	JER2	LMS	ARA	CAT1; Ret	CAT2; 15	ALB; Ret	NAV	ALG	VAL1	VAL1	34th	1

=== Grand Prix motorcycle racing ===
==== By season ====
Season	Class	Motorcycle	Team	Race	Win	Podium	Pole	FLap	Pts	Plcd	WCh
2015	Moto3	Mahindra	Mapfre Team Mahindra	18	0	0	0	0	45	17th	–
2016	Moto3	Mahindra	Pull & Bear Aspar Mahindra Team	16	0	1	0	0	72	16th	–
2017	Moto3	Honda	Del Conca Gresini Moto3	16	1	9	9	2	196	4th	–
2018	Moto3	Honda	Del Conca Gresini Moto3	17	7	10	11	3	260	**1st**	1
2019	Moto2	KTM	Red Bull KTM Ajo	19	0	2	0	1	94	11th	–
2020	Moto2	Kalex	Red Bull KTM Ajo	13	2	6	1	2	160	5th	–
2021	MotoGP	Ducati	Pramac Racing	14	1	4	4	0	111	9th	–
2022	MotoGP	Ducati	Pramac Racing	20	0	4	5	2	152	9th	–
2023	MotoGP	Ducati	Prima Pramac Racing	20	4	8	4	2	428	**2nd**	–
2024	MotoGP	Ducati	Prima Pramac Racing	20	3	16	7	2	508	**1st**	1
2025	MotoGP	Aprilia	Aprilia Racing	7	0	0	0	0	34	21st	–
2026	MotoGP	Aprilia	Aprilia Racing	17	1	9	4	0	355*	**1st***	–
Total				**180**	**19**	**69**	**45**	**14**	**2415**		**2**

==== By class ====
Class	Seasons	1st GP	1st pod	1st win	Race	Win	Podiums	Pole	FLap	Pts	WChmp
Moto3	2015–2018	2015 Qatar	2016 Czech Republic	2017 Valencia	67	8	20	20	5	573	1
Moto2	2019–2020	2019 Qatar	2019 Japan	2020 Austria	32	2	8	1	3	254	0
MotoGP	2021–present	2021 Qatar	2021 Doha	2021 Styria	98	9	41	24	6	1588	1
Total	2015–present				**197**	**19**	**69**	**45**	**14**	**2415**	**2**

==== Races by year ====
(key) (Races in bold indicate pole position; races in italics indicate fastest lap; ^{superscript} indicates point-scoring sprint position)

Year	Class	Bike	1	2	3	4	5	6	7	8	9	10	11	12	13	14	15	16	17	18	19	20	21	22	Pos	Pts
2015	Moto3	Mahindra	QAT; 15	AME; Ret	ARG; 22	SPA; 14	FRA; Ret	ITA; 17	CAT; 11	NED; 18	GER; 12	INP; 10	CZE; 11	GBR; Ret	RSM; 15	ARA; 7	JPN; 11	AUS; 15	MAL; 12	VAL; 14					17th	45
2016	Moto3	Mahindra	QAT; Ret	ARG; 8	AME; Ret	SPA; Ret	FRA; 18	ITA; 14	CAT; Ret	NED; WD	GER; Ret	AUT; 6	CZE; 2	GBR; 10	RSM; DNS	ARA; 6	JPN; Ret	AUS; 6	MAL; Ret	VAL; 10					16th	72
2017	Moto3	Honda	**QAT**; 3	ARG; 3	AME; 2	**SPA**; 9	**FRA**; Ret	**ITA**; 15	**CAT**; 3	**NED**; 4	GER; DNS	CZE; DNS	AUT; 3	GBR; 3	RSM; Ret	**ARA**; 4	JPN; 15	**AUS**; 3	MAL; 2	**VAL**; 1					4th	196
2018	Moto3	Honda	QAT; 1	ARG; 11	**AME**; 1	**SPA**; Ret	**FRA**; Ret	**ITA**; 1	CAT; Ret	**NED**; 1	**GER**; 1	CZE; DNS	AUT; 3	**GBR**; C	**RSM**; 2	**ARA**; 1	THA; 4	JPN; Ret	**AUS**; 5	**MAL**; 1	VAL; 2				1st	260
2019	Moto2	KTM	QAT; 15	ARG; Ret	AME; 15	SPA; Ret	FRA; 20	ITA; 16	CAT; 15	NED; Ret	GER; 9	CZE; 13	AUT; 7	GBR; 12	RSM; 12	ARA; 9	THA; 6	JPN; 3	AUS; 2	MAL; Ret	VAL; 5				11th	94
2020	Moto2	Kalex	QAT; 20	**SPA**; 3	ANC; 6	CZE; 8	AUT; 1	STY; 2	RSM	EMI	CAT; Ret	FRA; Ret	ARA; 3	TER; 6	EUR; 2	VAL; 1	POR; 6								5th	160
2021	MotoGP	Ducati	QAT; 15	**DOH**; 3	POR; DNS	SPA	FRA	ITA	CAT; 14	GER; 12	NED; Ret	**STY**; 1	**AUT**; 3	GBR; Ret	ARA; 9	RSM; Ret	AME; 5	EMI; Ret	ALR; 7	**VAL**; 2					9th	111
2022	MotoGP	Ducati	**QAT**; Ret	INA; Ret	ARG; 2	**AME**; 8	POR; Ret	SPA; 22	FRA; Ret	ITA; 13	CAT; 2	GER; 6	NED; 7	GBR; 5	AUT; 10	RSM; 9	ARA; 6	JPN; 3	THA; 9	**AUS**; 7	**MAL**; Ret	**VAL**; 3			9th	152
2023	MotoGP	Ducati	POR; Ret**^{2}**	ARG; 5**^{8}**	AME; Ret**^{3}**	SPA; 4^{4}	FRA; 2^{1}	ITA; 2^{3}	GER; 1^{1}	NED; 5^{6}	GBR; 6^{6}	AUT; 7^{3}	CAT; 3^{5}	**RSM**; 1^{1}	IND; 2^{1}	**JPN**; 1^{1}	INA; Ret^{1}	**AUS**; 5	**THA**; 1^{1}	MAL; 4^{2}	QAT; 10^{1}	VAL; Ret^{1}			2nd	428
2024	MotoGP	Ducati	**QAT**; 3**^{1}**	POR; 1**^{3}**	AME; 4**^{3}**	SPA; Ret**^{1}**	**FRA**; 1**^{1}**	CAT; 2**^{4}**	**ITA**; 3	NED; 2**^{2}**	**GER**; Ret**^{1}**	GBR; 2**^{2}**	**AUT**; 2**^{2}**	ARA; 2**^{2}**	RSM; 15**^{1}**	EMI; 2**^{2}**	**INA**; 1	JPN; 2**^{4}**	**AUS**; 2**^{1}**	THA; 2**^{2}**	MAL; 2**^{1}**	SLD; 3**^{3}**			1st	508
2025	MotoGP	Aprilia	THA	ARG	AME	QAT; Ret	SPA	FRA	GBR	ARA	ITA	NED	GER	CZE; 7	AUT; Ret	HUN; 4^{9}	CAT; 10	RSM; 13^{8}	JPN; DNS	INA	AUS	MAL	POR	VAL; Ret	21st	34
2026	MotoGP	Aprilia	THA; 4^{5}	BRA; 2**^{3}**	USA; 2**^{1}**	SPA; 4	FRA; 1**^{1}**	CAT; NC	ITA; 2^{2}	HUN; Ret^{6}	CZE; 9^{5}	**NED**; 3^{5}	GER; 5^{6}	**GBR**; 2^{1}	ARA; 5^{5}	RSM; 5^{3}	**AUT**; 2^{1}	**JPN**; 2^{3}	INA; 3^{4}	AUS; C	MAL; DNS	QAT; 7^{3}	POR	VAL	2nd*	371*

* Season still in progress.

== Records ==
As of 27 May 2026, Jorge Martín holds the following records:

MotoGP

- Most sprint race wins: 16
- Most sprint race podiums: 30

Moto3

- Most pole positions: 20
- Most pole positions in a single season: 11 (2018)
- Most consecutive pole positions: 5 (2017)
- Most wins from pole position: 7

== Awards ==
Year	Award	Category	Result	Ref.
2025	Orden del Dos de Mayo	Grand Cross (for becoming first rider from Madrid to win a MotoGP championship)	Won	

Sporting positions
Preceded by Karel Hanika	Red Bull MotoGP Rookies Cup champion 2014	Succeeded by Bo Bendsneyder
