= 2025 Australian motorcycle Grand Prix =

Motorcycle races in Phillip Island

(Australia) 2025 Australian Grand Prix
Race details
- Race 19 of 22 races in the 2025 Grand Prix motorcycle racing season
- Date: 19 October 2025
- Official name: Liqui Moly Australian Motorcycle Grand Prix
- Location: Phillip Island Grand Prix Circuit; Phillip Island, Victoria, Australia
- Course: Permanent racing facility; 4.448 km (2.764 mi)

MotoGP
Pole position
Rider	(France) Fabio Quartararo	Yamaha
Time	1:26.465	
Fastest lap
Rider	(Spain) Álex Márquez	Ducati
Time	1:27.782 on lap 10	
Podium
First	(Spain) Raúl Fernández	Aprilia
Second	(Italy) Fabio Di Giannantonio	Ducati
Third	(Italy) Marco Bezzecchi	Aprilia

Moto2
Pole position
Rider	(Brazil) Diogo Moreira	Kalex
Time	1:29.817	
Fastest lap
Rider	(Spain) Albert Arenas	Kalex
Time	1:30.253 on lap 2	
Podium
First	(Australia) Senna Agius	Kalex
Second	(Colombia) David Alonso	Kalex
Third	(Brazil) Diogo Moreira	Kalex

Moto3
Pole position
Rider	(Australia) Joel Kelso	KTM
Time	1:34.056	
Fastest lap
Rider	(Spain) Álvaro Carpe	KTM
Time	1:35.323 on lap 3	
Podium
First	(Spain) José Antonio Rueda	KTM
Second	(Australia) Joel Kelso	KTM
Third	(Spain) Álvaro Carpe	KTM

The 2025 Australian motorcycle Grand Prix (officially known as the Liqui Moly Australian Motorcycle Grand Prix) was the nineteenth round of the 2025 Grand Prix motorcycle racing season. All races were held at the Phillip Island Grand Prix Circuit in Phillip Island on 19 October 2025.

In the Moto3 class, Red Bull KTM Ajo secured their second Teams' Championship and their sixth across all classes.

== Background ==
In the qualifying session, Fabio Quartararo managed to take pole position, and this session marked the end of Ducati's 98 GP front row streak since the 2020 Valencian GP.

== MotoGP Sprint ==
The MotoGP Sprint was held on 18 October 2025.

Pos.	No.	Rider	Team	Manufacturer	Laps	Time/Retired	Grid	Points
1	72	(Italy) Marco Bezzecchi	Aprilia Racing	Aprilia	13	19:03.971	2	12
2	25	(Spain) Raúl Fernández	Trackhouse MotoGP Team	Aprilia	13	+3.149	4	9
3	37	(Spain) Pedro Acosta	Red Bull KTM Factory Racing	KTM	13	+5.310	5	7
4	43	(Australia) Jack Miller	Prima Pramac Yamaha MotoGP	Yamaha	13	+5.376	3	6
5	49	(Italy) Fabio Di Giannantonio	Pertamina Enduro VR46 Racing Team	Ducati	13	+5.416	10	5
6	73	(Spain) Álex Márquez	BK8 Gresini Racing MotoGP	Ducati	13	+6.109	6	4
7	20	(France) Fabio Quartararo	Monster Energy Yamaha MotoGP Team	Yamaha	13	+8.706	1	3
8	10	(Italy) Luca Marini	Honda HRC Castrol	Honda	13	+8.938	9	2
9	44	(Spain) Pol Espargaró	Red Bull KTM Tech3	KTM	13	+9.252	8	1
10	23	(Italy) Enea Bastianini	Red Bull KTM Tech3	KTM	13	+9.752	20	
11	36	(Spain) Joan Mir	Honda HRC Castrol	Honda	13	+10.231	14	
12	5	(France) Johann Zarco	LCR Honda Castrol	Honda	13	+12.104	15	
13	42	(Spain) Álex Rins	Monster Energy Yamaha MotoGP Team	Yamaha	13	+12.132	12	
14	88	(Portugal) Miguel Oliveira	Prima Pramac Yamaha MotoGP	Yamaha	13	+17.494	16	
15	21	(Italy) Franco Morbidelli	Pertamina Enduro VR46 Racing Team	Ducati	13	+18.967	17	
16	32	(Italy) Lorenzo Savadori	Aprilia Racing	Aprilia	13	+25.185	19	
17	79	(Japan) Ai Ogura	Trackhouse MotoGP Team	Aprilia	13	+27.784 (Note: 8-second penalty for illegal tyre pressures.)	18	
18	35	(Thailand) Somkiat Chantra	IDEMITSU Honda LCR	Honda	13	+28.945	21	
19	63	(Italy) Francesco Bagnaia	Ducati Lenovo Team	Ducati	13	+32.408	11	
20	51	(Italy) Michele Pirro	Ducati Lenovo Team	Ducati	13	+35.523	22	
Ret	54	(Spain) Fermín Aldeguer	BK8 Gresini Racing MotoGP	Ducati	10	Accident	7	
Ret	33	(South Africa) Brad Binder	Red Bull KTM Factory Racing	KTM	1	Accident	13	
Fastest sprint lap: (Italy) Marco Bezzecchi (Aprilia) – 1:27.122 (lap 7)
OFFICIAL MOTOGP SPRINT REPORT

== Race ==
=== MotoGP ===
Pos.	No.	Rider	Team	Manufacturer	Laps	Time/Retired	Grid	Points
1	25	(Spain) Raúl Fernández	Trackhouse MotoGP Team	Aprilia	27	39:49.571	4	25
2	49	(Italy) Fabio Di Giannantonio	Pertamina Enduro VR46 Racing Team	Ducati	27	+1.418	10	20
3	72	(Italy) Marco Bezzecchi	Aprilia Racing	Aprilia	27	+2.410	2	16
4	73	(Spain) Álex Márquez	BK8 Gresini Racing MotoGP	Ducati	27	+3.715	6	13
5	37	(Spain) Pedro Acosta	Red Bull KTM Factory Racing	KTM	27	+7.930	5	11
6	10	(Italy) Luca Marini	Honda HRC Castrol	Honda	27	+7.970	9	10
7	42	(Spain) Álex Rins	Monster Energy Yamaha MotoGP Team	Yamaha	27	+10.671	11	9
8	33	(South Africa) Brad Binder	Red Bull KTM Factory Racing	KTM	27	+12.270	16 (Note: 3-place grid penalty due to impeding riders in qualifying)	8
9	23	(Italy) Enea Bastianini	Red Bull KTM Tech3	KTM	27	+14.076	20	7
10	44	(Spain) Pol Espargaró	Red Bull KTM Tech3	KTM	27	+16.861	8	6
11	20	(France) Fabio Quartararo	Monster Energy Yamaha MotoGP Team	Yamaha	27	+16.965	1	5
12	88	(Portugal) Miguel Oliveira	Prima Pramac Yamaha MotoGP	Yamaha	27	+17.677	15	4
13	79	(Japan) Ai Ogura	Trackhouse MotoGP Team	Aprilia	27	+17.928	18	3
14	54	(Spain) Fermín Aldeguer	BK8 Gresini Racing MotoGP	Ducati	27	+18.413	7	2
15	21	(Italy) Franco Morbidelli	Pertamina Enduro VR46 Racing Team	Ducati	27	+27.881	17	1
16	32	(Italy) Lorenzo Savadori	Aprilia Racing	Aprilia	27	+34.169	19	
17	35	(Thailand) Somkiat Chantra	IDEMITSU Honda LCR	Honda	27	+50.043	21	
18	51	(Italy) Michele Pirro	Ducati Lenovo Team	Ducati	27	+50.303	22	
Ret	63	(Italy) Francesco Bagnaia	Ducati Lenovo Team	Ducati	23	Accident	14	
Ret	36	(Spain) Joan Mir	Honda HRC Castrol	Honda	9	Accident	12	
Ret	43	(Australia) Jack Miller	Prima Pramac Yamaha MotoGP	Yamaha	4	Accident	3	
Ret	5	(France) Johann Zarco	LCR Honda Castrol	Honda	4	Accident	13	
Fastest lap: (Spain) Álex Márquez (Ducati) – 1:27.782 (lap 10)
OFFICIAL MOTOGP RACE REPORT

== Championship standings after the race ==
Below are the standings for the top five riders, constructors, and teams after the round.

=== MotoGP ===
Riders' Championship standings

	Pos.	Rider	Points
	1	(Spain) Marc Márquez	545
	2	(Spain) Álex Márquez	379
1	3	(Italy) Marco Bezzecchi	282
1	4	(Italy) Francesco Bagnaia	274
	5	(Spain) Pedro Acosta	233

Constructors' Championship standings

Pos.	Constructor	Points
1	(Italy) Ducati	671
2	(Italy) Aprilia	345
3	(Austria) KTM	298
4	(Japan) Honda	248
5	(Japan) Yamaha	205

Teams' Championship standings

Pos.	Team	Points
1	(Italy) Ducati Lenovo Team	819
2	(Italy) BK8 Gresini Racing MotoGP	562
3	(Italy) Pertamina Enduro VR46 Racing Team	424
4	(Austria) Red Bull KTM Factory Racing	359
5	(Italy) Aprilia Racing	324

=== Moto2 ===
Riders' Championship standings

Pos.	Rider	Points
1	(Spain) Manuel González	247
2	(Brazil) Diogo Moreira	245
3	(Spain) Arón Canet	212
4	(Belgium) Barry Baltus	205
5	(United Kingdom) Jake Dixon	190

Constructors' Championship standings

Pos.	Constructor	Points
1	(Germany) Kalex	453
2	(Italy) Boscoscuro	286
3	(Switzerland) Forward	13

Teams' Championship standings

	Pos.	Team	Points
	1	(Italy) Fantic Racing	417
	2	(Germany) Liqui Moly Dynavolt Intact GP	380
2	3	(Spain) CFMoto Power Electronics Aspar Team	283
	4	(Italy) Italtrans Racing Team	272
2	5	(Belgium) Elf Marc VDS Racing Team	272

=== Moto3 ===
Riders' Championship standings

Pos.	Rider	Points
1	(Spain) José Antonio Rueda	365
2	(Spain) Ángel Piqueras	231
3	(Spain) Máximo Quiles	228
4	(Spain) David Muñoz	197
5	(Australia) Joel Kelso	179

Constructors' Championship standings

Pos.	Constructor	Points
1	(Austria) KTM	475
2	(Japan) Honda	242

Teams' Championship standings

	Pos.	Team	Points
	1	(Finland) Red Bull KTM Ajo	538
	2	(Spain) Frinsa – MT Helmets – MSi	354
	3	(Spain) CFMoto Gaviota Aspar Team	335
	4	(Germany) Liqui Moly Dynavolt Intact GP	294
1	5	(Italy) LevelUp – MTA	260

== Notes ==
Previous race: 2025 Indonesian Grand Prix	FIM Grand Prix World Championship; 2025 season	Next race: 2025 Malaysian Grand Prix
Previous race: 2024 Australian Grand Prix	Australian motorcycle Grand Prix	Next race: 2026 Australian Grand Prix
