= Enea Bastianini =

Italian motorcycle racer

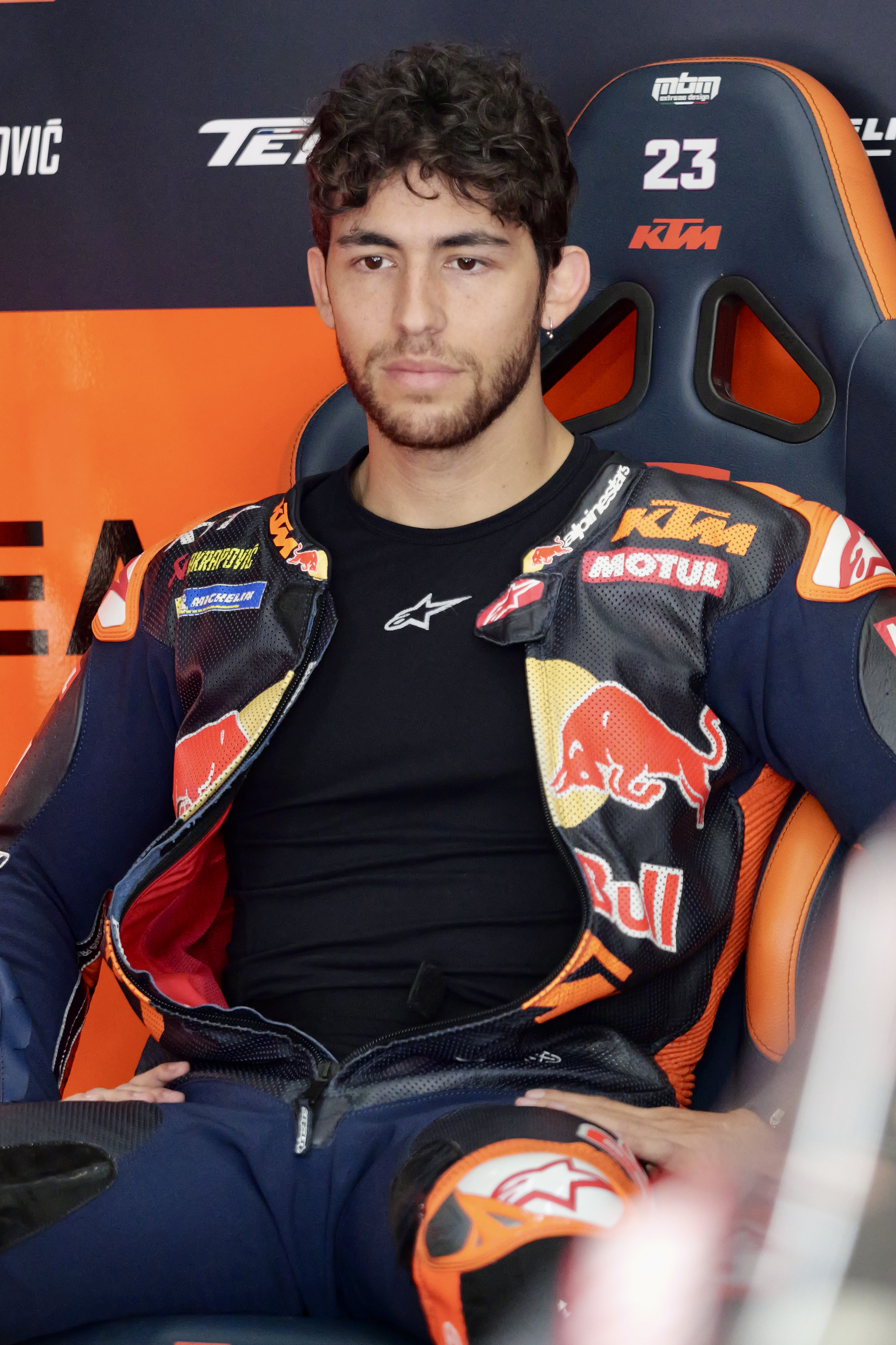
- Bastianini at the 2026 Spanish Grand Prix
- Nationality: Italian
- Born: 30 December 1997 (age 28); Rimini, Italy
- Current team: Red Bull KTM Tech3
- Bike number: 23
Motorcycle racing career statistics
MotoGP World Championship
Active years	2021–
Manufacturers	Ducati (2021–2024); KTM (2025–)
Championships	0
2025 championship position	14th (112 pts)
Starts / Wins / Podiums / Poles / F. laps / Points; 90 / 7 / 19 / 2 / 8 / 903
Moto2 World Championship
Active years	2019–2020
Manufacturers	Kalex
Championships	1 (2020)
2020 championship position	1st (205 pts)
Starts / Wins / Podiums / Poles / F. laps / Points; 33 / 3 / 8 / 0 / 2 / 302
Moto3 World Championship
Active years	2014–2018
Manufacturers	KTM (2014); Honda (2015–2018)
Championships	0
2018 championship position	4th (177 pts)
Starts / Wins / Podiums / Poles / F. laps / Points; 88 / 3 / 24 / 9 / 3 / 829

Enea Bastianini (born 30 December 1997), nicknamed "La Bestia" (The Beast), is an Italian Grand Prix motorcycle racer, riding for Red Bull KTM Tech3 in the MotoGP class. He won the 2020 Moto2 World Championship.

Bastianini is contracted to Tech3 until the end of the 2026 season, and will leave the team to join Trackhouse in 2027.

== Career ==
=== Early career ===
Born in Rimini, Bastianini first rode a minibike aged three years and three months: hence his racing number, 33. After a successful career in minibike racing, Bastianini raced successfully in various categories, including the Honda HIRP Trophy 100cc, the MiniGP 70cc Italian Championship and the Honda RS125 Trophy, where he finished as champion during the 2012 season. In 2013, Bastianini competed in the Red Bull MotoGP Rookies Cup, where he took two victories en route to a fourth-place finish in the championship. Bastianini also took his first steps in Moto3, participating in five races of the Italian Championship.

=== Moto3 World Championship ===
In 2014, Bastianini made his debut in the Moto3 World Championship riding for Team GO&FUN Moto3. Bastianini scored his first points in his second start, finishing 13th at the Circuit of the Americas in Texas, commencing a run of four consecutive points-scoring finishes; he took top ten placings at the Argentine, Spanish and French Grands Prix. After failing to finish his home race at Mugello, Bastianini took his first podium with a second-place finish in Catalunya; he added another second-place finish in the Czech Republic and a third-place finish in the following race in Great Britain. Bastianini finished the season ninth in the riders' championship.

In 2015, Bastianini emerged as runaway leader Danny Kent's nearest challenger, taking five podium finishes – including four second places – and two pole positions in the first eleven races of the season. At Misano in September, Bastianini took his first race victory; having started from pole position, Bastianini was part of the five-rider lead battle for the whole race, and took the race win after a final-lap pass on Miguel Oliveira. Bastianini finished the season in third place in the final championship standings.

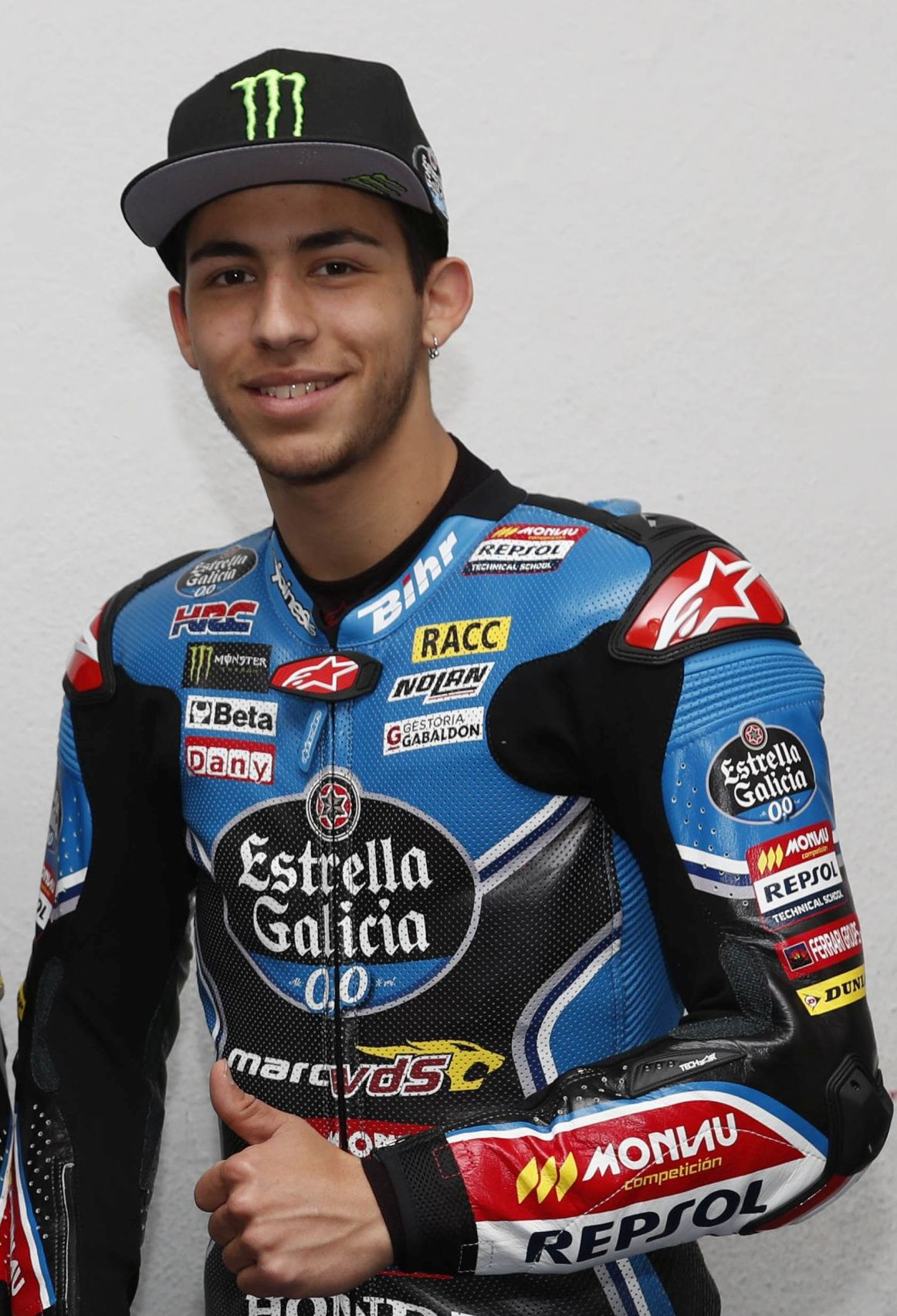
Bastianini in 2017

In 2016, Bastianini continued to race in the Moto3 class with Gresini Racing Moto3. He finished the season as the championship runner-up, taking 177 points with six podiums and a win at Motegi.

=== Moto2 World Championship ===
==== Italtrans Racing Team (2019–2020) ====
In 2019, Bastianini joined the Italtrans Racing Team and finished the season in tenth place taking 97 points with one podium.

Bastianini then finished as world champion for the 2020 Moto2 season, taking 205 points from three wins and seven podiums.

=== MotoGP World Championship ===
==== Avintia Esponsorama Racing (2021) ====
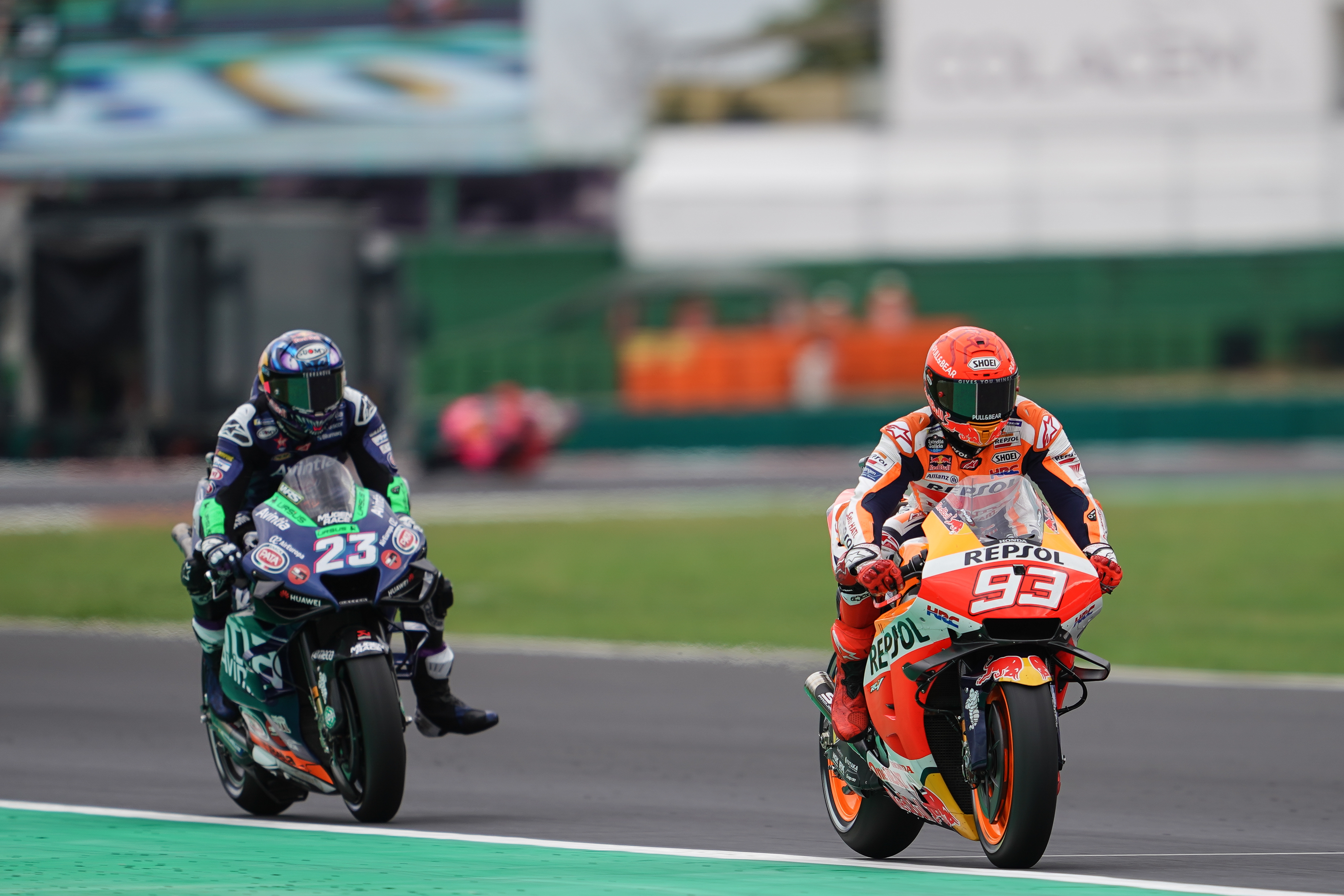
Bastianini (#23) and Marc Márquez at the 2021 San Marino Grand Prix

Bastianini signed with Esponsorama Racing for the 2021 MotoGP season and was partnered with Moto2 rival and compatriot Luca Marini. Both Bastianini and Marini rode two-year-old specification Ducati GP19 bikes the whole season. Bastianini scored points consistently during the season, before getting his then best result in Aragon in sixth position, followed by a third-place finish in Misano, a repeat sixth-place finish again in COTA, and a repeated third-place finish again at the Emilia Romagna Grand Prix in Misano during the last lap. Bastianini finished the season 11th in the riders' standings with 102 points.

==== Gresini Racing MotoGP (2022) ====
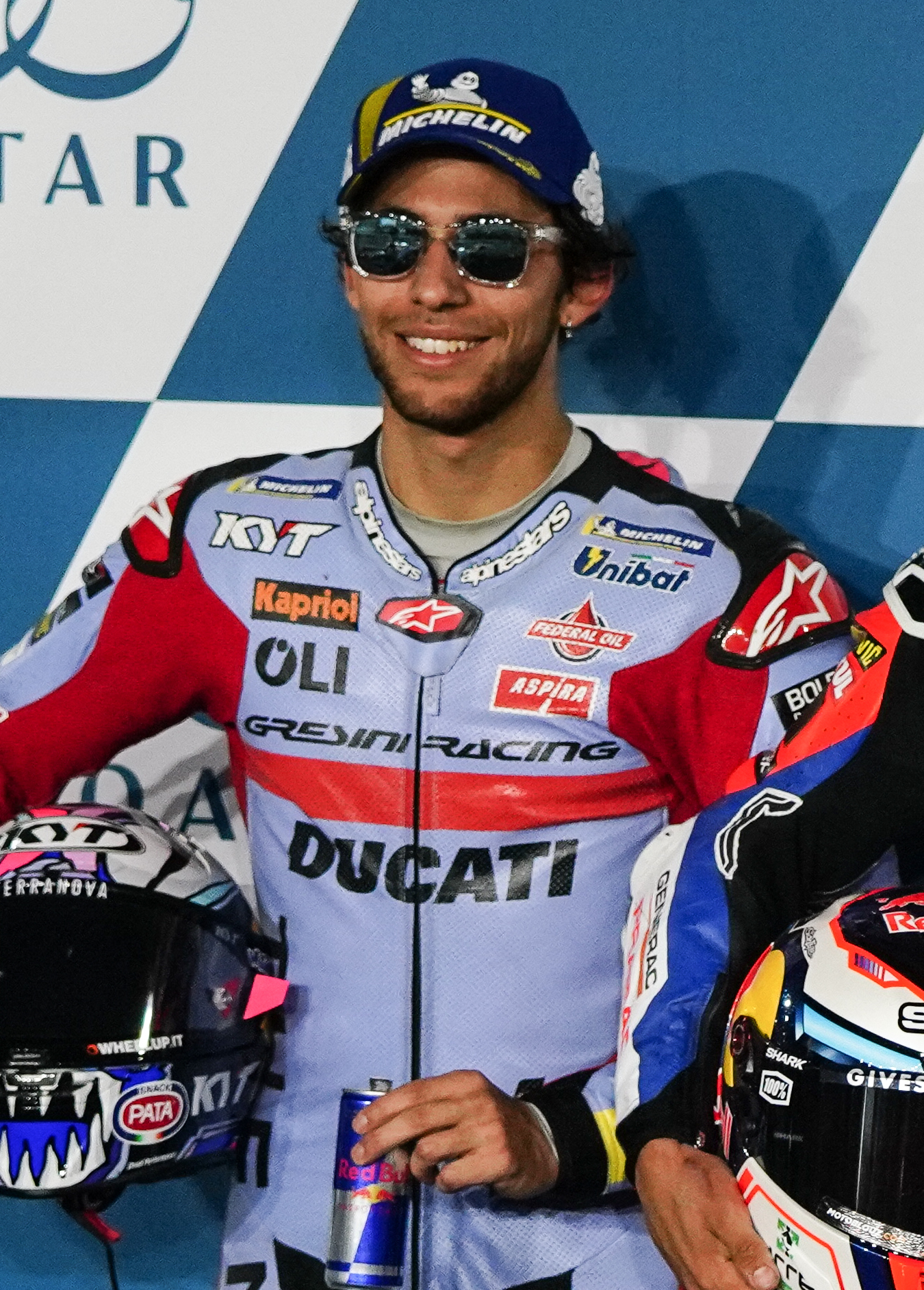
Bastianini at the 2022 Qatar Grand Prix

Bastianini won the first race of the 2022 MotoGP season, the 2022 Qatar Grand Prix and became the championship leader. Gresini Racing and Bastianini made history by winning with a 2021-specification Ducati Desmosedici GP21. After mid-pack results in Indonesia and Argentina, where he took 11th and tenth respectively, he took his second win at the Circuit of the Americas in Austin. This was followed by a DNF in Portugal and eighth in Jerez. At the French Grand Prix in Le Mans, Bastianini took another win, after overtaking both factory Ducatis to return to the top step of the podium. This win meant he was just eight points adrift of championship leader Fabio Quartararo after seven rounds. He returned again to the podium with a second-place finish in at the San Marino Grand Prix. Bastianini then took his fourth win of the season at the Aragón Grand Prix, then another second-place finish at the Malaysian Grand Prix.

==== Ducati Lenovo Team (2023–2024) ====
Bastianini switched to Ducati Lenovo Team for the 2023 MotoGP World Championship, replacing Jack Miller and partnering Francesco Bagnaia. Bastianini never felt comfortable with the Ducati Desmosedici GP23, which he attributed to a vastly different front end feeling as compared to the Desmosedici GP21 he rode to four victories in the previous season.

Bastianini was forced to miss the opening three rounds of the season through injury after being involved in a first lap incident instigated by Luca Marini at the Portuguese Grand Prix which affected his form throughout 2023. After another first lap incident at the Catalan Grand Prix, he subsequently missed the following three rounds at San Marino, India and Japan due to recurring injuries.

Bastianini produced an impressive comeback after a complicated 2023 season by securing a dominant victory at the Malaysian Grand Prix, holding off teammate Bagnaia and Jorge Martín.

Bastianini after having fully recovered from his injuries from 2023, performed well in the 2024 MotoGP World Championship pre-season tests and took a liking to the 2024 Ducati Desmosedici GP24 immediately. He started the season in strong form and secured pole position and his first podium of the season at the Portuguese Grand Prix. Though despite an impressive sprint and main race double at Silverstone and a race win at Misano, Bastianini failed to sustain a title challenge in 2024 and ended the season in fourth.

==== Red Bull KTM Tech 3 (2025–2026) ====
On 13 June 2024, it was announced that Bastianini signed for the Red Bull KTM Tech3 as an official factory rider, alongside former Aprilia rider Maverick Viñales.

==== Trackhouse Racing (2027–) ====
Bastianini will move to Trackhouse Racing for the 2027 season on a two-year contract, partnering Raúl Fernández.

== Career statistics ==
=== Red Bull MotoGP Rookies Cup ===
==== Races by year ====
(key) (Races in bold indicate pole position, races in italics indicate fastest lap)

Year	1	2	3	4	5	6	7	8	9	10	11	12	13	14	Pos	Pts
2013	AME1; 15	AME2; 9	JER1; 3	JER2; 1	ASS1; 8	ASS2; 8	SAC1; 7	SAC2; 7	BRN; Ret	SIL1; 4	SIL2; 9	**MIS**; 4	ARA1; 9	ARA2; 1	4th	148

=== Grand Prix motorcycle racing ===
==== By season ====
Season	Class	Motorcycle	Team	Race	Win	Podium	Pole	FLap	Pts	Plcd	WCh
2014	Moto3	KTM	Junior Team Go&Fun Moto3	18	0	3	0	0	127	9th	–
2015	Moto3	Honda	Gresini Racing Team Moto3	18	1	6	4	2	207	**3rd**	–
2016	Moto3	Honda	Gresini Racing Team Moto3	16	1	6	3	0	177	**2nd**	–
2017	Moto3	Honda	Estrella Galicia 0,0	18	0	3	1	0	141	6th	–
2018	Moto3	Honda	Leopard Racing	18	1	6	1	1	177	4th	–
2019	Moto2	Kalex	Italtrans Racing Team	18	0	1	0	0	97	10th	–
2020	Moto2	Kalex	Italtrans Racing Team	15	3	7	0	2	205	**1st**	1
2021	MotoGP	Ducati	Avintia Esponsorama Racing	18	0	2	0	1	102	11th	–
2022	MotoGP	Ducati	Gresini Racing MotoGP	20	4	6	1	3	219	**3rd**	–
2023	MotoGP	Ducati	Ducati Lenovo Team	11	1	1	0	2	84	15th	–
2024	MotoGP	Ducati	Ducati Lenovo Team	20	2	9	1	2	386	4th	–
2025	MotoGP	KTM	Red Bull KTM Tech3	21	0	1	0	0	112	14th	–
2026	MotoGP	KTM	Red Bull KTM Tech3	0	0	0	0	0			–
Total				**211**	**13**	**51**	**11**	**13**	**2034**		**1**

==== By class ====
Class	Seasons	1st GP	1st podium	1st win	Race	Win	Podiums	Pole	FLap	Pts	WChmp
Moto3	2014–2018	2014 Qatar	2014 Catalunya	2015 San Marino	88	3	24	9	3	829	0
Moto2	2019–2020	2019 Qatar	2019 Czech Republic	2020 Andalusia	33	3	8	0	2	302	1
MotoGP	2021–present	2021 Qatar	2021 San Marino	2022 Qatar	90	7	19	2	8	903	0
Total	2014–present				**211**	**13**	**51**	**11**	**13**	**2034**	**1**

==== Races by year ====
(key) (Races in bold indicate pole position; races in italics indicate fastest lap; ^{superscript} indicates point-scoring sprint position)

Year	Class	Bike	1	2	3	4	5	6	7	8	9	10	11	12	13	14	15	16	17	18	19	20	21	22	Pos	Pts
2014	Moto3	KTM	QAT; 16	AME; 13	ARG; 10	SPA; 9	FRA; 7	ITA; Ret	CAT; 2	NED; Ret	GER; 15	INP; 11	CZE; 2	GBR; 3	RSM; 5	ARA; 6	JPN; 8	AUS; Ret	MAL; 10	VAL; 11					9th	127
2015	Moto3	Honda	QAT; 2	AME; 4	ARG; 9	SPA; 9	FRA; 2	ITA; 5	**CAT**; 2	**NED**; 6	GER; 3	INP; 6	CZE; 2	GBR; Ret	**RSM**; 1	**ARA**; Ret	JPN; 7	AUS; Ret	MAL; 8	VAL; 5					3rd	207
2016	Moto3	Honda	QAT; 5	ARG; 17	AME; 6	SPA; 8	FRA	ITA; 12	CAT; 3	**NED**; Ret	**GER**; 3	AUT; 3	CZE; 4	GBR; 7	RSM; 2	**ARA**; 3	JPN; 1	AUS; Ret	MAL	VAL; 4					2nd	177
2017	Moto3	Honda	QAT; 16	ARG; 27	AME; 4	SPA; 8	FRA; 6	ITA; 11	CAT; 4	NED; Ret	GER; 6	CZE; 17	AUT; 10	GBR; 2	**RSM**; 14	ARA; 3	JPN; 16	AUS; 5	MAL; 3	VAL; 5					6th	141
2018	Moto3	Honda	QAT; Ret	ARG; 4	AME; 2	SPA; Ret	FRA; Ret	ITA; 6	**CAT**; 1	NED; 3	GER; Ret	CZE; 4	AUT; 2	GBR; C	RSM; Ret	ARA; 3	THA; Ret	JPN; 7	AUS; 8	MAL; 3	VAL; 5				4th	177
2019	Moto2	Kalex	QAT; 9	ARG; 9	AME; 9	SPA; 11	FRA; 7	ITA; 6	CAT; 5	NED; Ret	GER; 14	CZE; 3	AUT; Ret	GBR; DNS	RSM; 9	ARA; 24	THA; 11	JPN; 7	AUS; 17	MAL; 24	VAL; 14				10th	97
2020	Moto2	Kalex	QAT; 3	SPA; 9	ANC; 1	CZE; 1	AUT; Ret	STY; 10	RSM; 3	EMI; 1	CAT; 6	FRA; 11	ARA; 2	TER; 3	EUR; 4	VAL; 6	POR; 5								1st	205
2021	MotoGP	Ducati	QAT; 10	DOH; 11	POR; 9	SPA; Ret	FRA; 14	ITA; Ret	CAT; 10	GER; 16	NED; 15	STY; 12	AUT; Ret	GBR; 12	ARA; 6	RSM; 3	AME; 6	EMI; 3	ALR; 9	VAL; 8					11th	102
2022	MotoGP	Ducati	QAT; 1	INA; 11	ARG; 10	AME; 1	POR; Ret	SPA; 8	FRA; 1	ITA; Ret	CAT; Ret	GER; 10	NED; 11	GBR; 4	**AUT**; Ret	RSM; 2	ARA; 1	JPN; 9	THA; 6	AUS; 5	MAL; 2	VAL; 8			3rd	219
2023	MotoGP	Ducati	POR; DNS	ARG	AME	SPA; DNS	FRA	ITA; 9^{9}	GER; 8	NED; Ret^{8}	GBR; Ret	AUT; 10	CAT; DNS^{9}	RSM	IND	JPN	INA; 8^{7}	AUS; 10	THA; 13	MAL; 1^{4}	QAT; 8	VAL; Ret			15th	84
2024	MotoGP	Ducati	QAT; 5^{6}	**POR**; 2^{6}	AME; 3^{6}	SPA; 5	FRA; 4^{4}	CAT; 18^{5}	ITA; 2	NED; 3^{4}	GER; 4^{4}	GBR; 1^{1}	AUT; 3^{4}	ARA; 5^{7}	RSM; 3^{4}	EMI; 1^{3}	INA; Ret^{2}	JPN; 4^{2}	AUS; 5^{3}	THA; 14^{1}	MAL; 3^{3}	SLD; 7^{2}			4th	386
2025	MotoGP	KTM	THA; 9	ARG; 17	AME; 7	QAT; 11	SPA; 9	FRA; 13	GBR; 17	ARA; 12	ITA; Ret	NED; 9	GER; WD	CZE; Ret^{3}	AUT; 5^{7}	HUN; Ret	CAT; 3^{5}	RSM; Ret	JPN; 11	INA; Ret	AUS; 9	MAL; 7^{9}	POR; 18	VAL; 10	14th	112
2026	MotoGP	KTM	THA; 12	BRA; 15	USA; 6^{3}	SPA; 8	FRA; 7	CAT; Ret	ITA; Ret	HUN; 9^{8}	CZE; 10^{7}	NED; 6^{8}	GER; 9	GBR; Ret	ARA; 8	RSM; 8	AUT; 11	JPN; 4^{4}	INA; 10	AUS; C	MAL; 5^{9}	QAT; 5^{8}	POR; 11	VAL	10th*	152*

* Season still in progress.
