= Leopard Racing =

Grand Prix motorcycle racing team

- 2025 name: Leopard Racing
- Base: Howald, Luxembourg
- Principal: Miodrag Kotur
- Rider(s): Moto3: 31. Adrián Fernández; 94. Guido Pini
- Motorcycle: Honda NSF250RW
- Tyres: Pirelli
- Riders' Championships: Moto3: 2015: Danny Kent; 2017: Joan Mir; 2019: Lorenzo Dalla Porta; 2023: Jaume Masià
- Teams' Championships: Moto3: 2019; 2020

Leopard Racing is a Luxembourg–Italian motorcycle racing team competing in the Moto3 World Championship. The team has won two Moto3 Teams' Championships.

== History ==
Leopard Racing was founded by Flavio Becca at the end of 2014 with the intention of participating in the Moto3 World Championship the following year. Thanks to the sponsor Leopard Natural Power Drink, they made their debut at the Qatar GP, and ended the season with the riders' title.

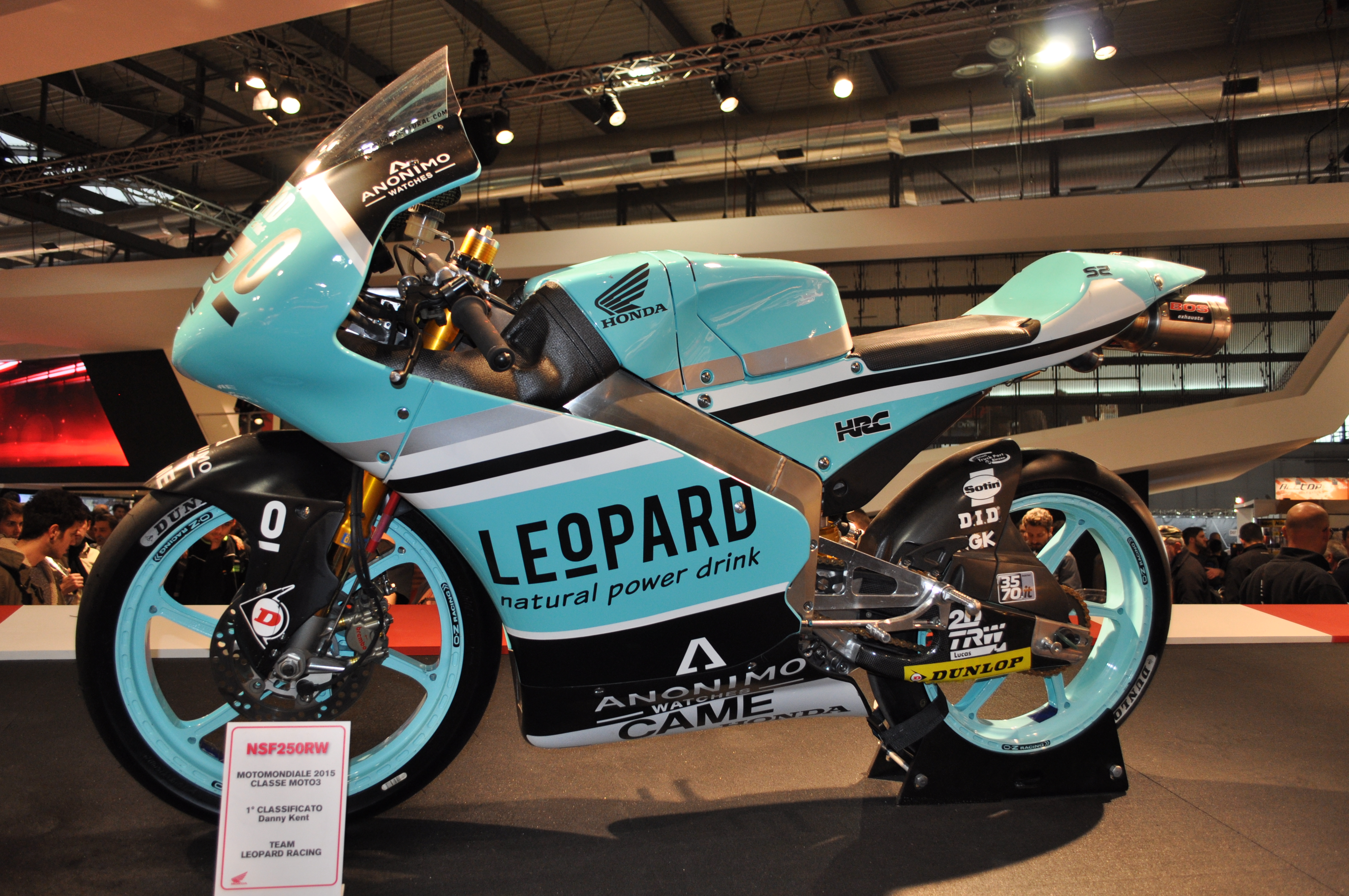
Danny Kent's bike from 2015

Leopard Racing has three riders: Danny Kent, Efrén Vázquez and Hiroki Ono. Over the course of the season, the team captured 14 podiums: 9 times for Danny Kent and 5 times for Efrén Vázquez. In the Australian GP, the injured Hiroki Ono is replaced by Joan Mir. Danny Kent is world champion in the last race in Valencia.

For the 2016 season, Leopard Racing also debuts in the Moto2 class with Danny Kent and Miguel Oliveira on Kalex bikes. Due to a collarbone injury sustained during qualifying for the Aragon GP, Oliveira was forced to miss 4 races. Italian rider Alessandro Nocco took Oliveira's place during the Grand Prix Australian and Malaysian GPs. Oliveira ended the season just one point away from winning the best rookie of the year.

In Moto3 the team changed from the Honda NSF250R to the KTM RC250GP, the team's riders are Joan Mir, Italian Andrea Locatelli and Frenchman Fabio Quartararo. They managed to conquer 5 podiums in total with a victory obtained by Mir in the Austrian GP. At the end of the season Mir won the rookie of the year award with fifth place, Locatelli ended the season with ninth position, while Quartararo finished in thirteenth place in the overall classification.

In 2017, the team returned to competing only in the Moto3 category with Honda motorcycles, lining up at the start of the championship with Joan Mir and the Belgian rider Livio Loi, with the Spaniard becoming world champion during the Australian GP. In 2018 the two Honda NSF250R are entrusted to Italians Enea Bastianini and Lorenzo Dalla Porta who each win a Grand Prix allowing the team to place third in the standings. For 2019 the confirmed Dalla Porta is joined by Spaniard Marcos Ramírez after two seasons with KTM. Dalla Porta is the Moto3 champion and Leopard won the team classification with five victories in the season.

In the 2020 World Championship the two Honda NSF250Rs are entrusted to Italian Dennis Foggia and Spaniard Jaume Masiá who ended the season in sixth and tenth place in the standings respectively. The sum of their points allowed the team to excel in the team ranking.

In 2021 Dennis Foggia is confirmed, and the rookie Xavier Artigas is hired alongside him. Despite a not making perfect start, the Roman rider managed to fight for the world title against the KTM of Pedro Acosta. But the fight ended prematurely during the Grand Prix of Algarve, where Foggia crashed due to contact caused by Honda rider Darryn Binder, which also involved Spanish rider Sergio Garcia. Following the fall of Foggia and the victory of Acosta, the Roman rider lost the chance of being able to fight for the title again. The season ended with the first career victory for Artigas at Valencia, with Foggia vice-champion and third place in the team classification.

== Results ==
| Year | Class | Team name | Motorcycle | No. | Riders | Races | Wins | Podiums | Poles | F. laps | Points | Pos. |
|---|---|---|---|---|---|---|---|---|---|---|---|---|
| 2015 | Moto3 | Leopard Racing | Honda NSF250RW | 7 | (Spain) Efrén Vázquez | 18 | 0 | 5 | 0 | 1 | 155 | 8th |
| 2015 | Moto3 | Leopard Racing | Honda NSF250RW | 52 | (United Kingdom) Danny Kent | 18 | 6 | 9 | 5 | 3 | 260 | 1st |
| 2015 | Moto3 | Leopard Racing | Honda NSF250RW | 76 | (Japan) Hiroki Ono | 17 | 0 | 0 | 0 | 0 | 29 | 21st |
| 2015 | Moto3 | Leopard Racing | Honda NSF250RW | 36 | (Spain) Joan Mir | 1 | 0 | 0 | 0 | 0 | 0 | NC |
| 2016 | Moto2 | Leopard Racing | Kalex Moto2 | 44 | (Portugal) Miguel Oliveira | 16 | 0 | 0 | 0 | 0 | 36 | 21st |
| 2016 | Moto2 | Leopard Racing | Kalex Moto2 | 52 | (United Kingdom) Danny Kent | 18 | 0 | 0 | 0 | 0 | 35 | 22nd |
| 2016 | Moto2 | Leopard Racing | Kalex Moto2 | 20 | (Italy) Alessandro Nocco | 2 | 0 | 0 | 0 | 0 | 0 | NC |
| 2016 | Moto3 | Leopard Racing | KTM RC250GP | 20 | (France) Fabio Quartararo | 18 | 0 | 0 | 0 | 0 | 83 | 13th |
| 2016 | Moto3 | Leopard Racing | KTM RC250GP | 36 | (Spain) Joan Mir | 18 | 1 | 3 | 1 | 2 | 144 | 5th |
| 2016 | Moto3 | Leopard Racing | KTM RC250GP | 55 | (Italy) Andrea Locatelli | 18 | 0 | 2 | 0 | 2 | 96 | 9th |
| 2017 | Moto3 | Leopard Racing | Honda NSF250RW | 11 | (Belgium) Livio Loi | 16 | 0 | 1 | 0 | 0 | 80 | 13th |
| 2017 | Moto3 | Leopard Racing | Honda NSF250RW | 36 | (Spain) Joan Mir | 18 | 10 | 13 | 1 | 3 | 341 | 1st |
| 2017 | Moto3 | Leopard Racing | Honda NSF250RW | 37 | (Spain) Aaron Polanco | 1 | 0 | 0 | 0 | 0 | 0 | 42nd |
| 2018 | Moto3 | Leopard Racing | Honda NSF250RW | 33 | (Italy) Enea Bastianini | 18 | 1 | 6 | 1 | 1 | 177 | 4th |
| 2018 | Moto3 | Leopard Racing | Honda NSF250RW | 48 | (Italy) Lorenzo Dalla Porta | 18 | 1 | 5 | 0 | 2 | 151 | 5th |
| 2018 | Moto3 | Leopard Racing | Honda NSF250RW | 96 | (Italy) Manuel Pagliani | 1 | 0 | 0 | 0 | 0 | 6 | 34th |
| 2019 | Moto3 | Leopard Racing | Honda NSF250RW | 42 | (Spain) Marcos Ramírez | 19 | 2 | 4 | 2 | 1 | 183 | 3rd |
| 2019 | Moto3 | Leopard Racing | Honda NSF250RW | 48 | (Italy) Lorenzo Dalla Porta | 19 | 4 | 11 | 1 | 1 | 279 | 1st |
| 2019 | Moto3 | Leopard Impala Junior Team | Honda NSF250RW | 4 | (Spain) Xavier Artigas | 1 | 0 | 1 | 0 | 0 | 16 | 26th |
| 2020 | Moto3 | Leopard Racing | Honda NSF250RW | 5 | (Spain) Jaume Masià | 15 | 2 | 3 | 1 | 2 | 140 | 6th |
| 2020 | Moto3 | Leopard Racing | Honda NSF250RW | 7 | (Italy) Dennis Foggia | 15 | 1 | 3 | 0 | 0 | 89 | 10th |
| 2021 | Moto3 | Leopard Racing; Leopard Impala Junior Team | Honda NSF250RW | 7 | (Italy) Dennis Foggia | 18 | 5 | 10 | 0 | 0 | 216 | 2nd |
| 2021 | Moto3 | Leopard Racing; Leopard Impala Junior Team | Honda NSF250RW | 43 | (Spain) Xavier Artigas | 16 | 1 | 1 | 0 | 2 | 72 | 15th |
| 2022 | Moto3 | Leopard Racing | Honda NSF250RW | 7 | (Italy) Dennis Foggia | 20 | 4 | 8 | 4 | 2 | 246 | 3rd |
| 2022 | Moto3 | Leopard Racing | Honda NSF250RW | 24 | (Japan) Tatsuki Suzuki | 20 | 0 | 3 | 1 | 0 | 130 | 7th |
| 2023 | Moto3 | Leopard Racing | Honda NSF250RW | 5 | (Spain) Jaume Masià | 18 | 4 | 10 | 6 | 1 | 274 | 1st |
| 2023 | Moto3 | Leopard Racing | Honda NSF250RW | 24 | (Japan) Tatsuki Suzuki | 12 | 1 | 1 | 0 | 0 | 50 | 19th |
| 2023 | Moto3 | Leopard Racing | Honda NSF250RW | 31 | (Spain) Adrián Fernández | 8 | 0 | 0 | 0 | 0 | 25 | 22nd |
| 2024 | Moto3 | Leopard Racing | Honda NSF250RW | 31 | (Spain) Adrián Fernández | 20 | 0 | 3 | 1 | 2 | 158 | 6th |
| 2024 | Moto3 | Leopard Racing | Honda NSF250RW | 36 | (Spain) Ángel Piqueras | 20 | 1 | 4 | 1 | 1 | 153 | 8th |
| 2025 | Moto3 | Leopard Racing | Honda NSF250RW | 22 | (Spain) David Almansa | 22 | 0 | 1 | 2 | 0 | 134 | 11th |
| 2025 | Moto3 | Leopard Racing | Honda NSF250RW | 31 | (Spain) Adrián Fernández | 19 | 1 | 4 | 1 | 0 | 179 | 7th |
| 2025 | Moto3 | Leopard Racing | Honda NSF250RW | 78 | (Spain) Joel Esteban | 1 (8) | 0 | 0 | 0 | 0 | 0 (33) | 19th |
| 2026 | Moto3 | Leopard Racing | Honda NSF250RW | 31 | (Spain) Adrián Fernández | 19 | 0 | 3 | 1 | 1 | 177* | 5th* |
| 2026 | Moto3 | Leopard Racing | Honda NSF250RW | 94 | (Italy) Guido Pini | 19 | 1 | 1 | 0 | 1 | 86* | 12th* |

Key
Regular rider
Replacement rider
Wildcard rider
Replacement/wildcard rider

Notes

* Season still in progress.
