= List of Grand Prix motorcycle racing World Teams' Champions =

Grand Prix motorcycle racing is the premier championship of motorcycle road racing, which has been divided into three classes: MotoGP, Moto2, and Moto3. Former classes that have been discontinued include 350cc, 250cc, 125cc, 50cc/80cc, MotoE, and Sidecar. The Grand Prix Road-Racing World Championship was established in 1949 by the sport's governing body, the Fédération Internationale de Motocyclisme (FIM), and is the oldest motorsport world championship in existence.

The Teams' World Championship is awarded to the most successful team over a season, as determined by a points system based on Grand Prix results. It is awarded since 2002 in MotoGP and since 2018 in Moto2 and Moto3. MotoE was introduced in 2019 as a "World Cup" until 2022 and thus statistics from that time span are not awarded here. MotoE only gained World Championship status from 2023 until 2025, because MotoE class went on hiatus after the 2025 season. All the riders for each team contribute points towards the championship. The winner of the teams' world championship is not necessarily the team of the riders' world champion. For example, in 2016, Marc Márquez who rode for Repsol Honda Team won the riders' world championship, but in the teams' standings, Movistar Yamaha MotoGP have higher points than Repsol Honda Team, therefore Movistar Yamaha MotoGP won teams' world championship.

== By year ==
Key
(X)	Denotes the number of times the team has won the championship for that class
*	Winning team is different from the team of the Riders' Champion that year

Year	MotoGP
2002	(Japan) Repsol Honda Team (1)
2003	(Japan) Repsol Honda (2)
2004	(Japan) Gauloises Fortuna Yamaha (1)
2005	(Japan) Gauloises Yamaha Team (2)
2006	(Japan) Repsol Honda Team (3)
2007	(Italy) Ducati Marlboro Team (1)
2008	(Japan) Fiat Yamaha Team (3)
2009	(Japan) Fiat Yamaha Team (4)
2010	(Japan) Fiat Yamaha Team (5)
2011	(Japan) Repsol Honda Team (4)
2012	(Japan) Repsol Honda Team* (5)
2013	(Japan) Repsol Honda Team (6)
2014	(Japan) Repsol Honda Team (7)
2015	(Japan) Movistar Yamaha MotoGP (6)
2016	(Japan) Movistar Yamaha MotoGP* (7)
2017	(Japan) Repsol Honda Team (8)

Year	MotoGP	Moto2	Moto3
2018	(Japan) Repsol Honda Team (9)	(Finland) Red Bull KTM Ajo* (1)	(Italy) Del Conca Gresini Moto3 (1)
2019	(Japan) Repsol Honda Team (10)	(Spain) Flexbox HP40* (1)	(Luxembourg) Leopard Racing (1)
2020	(Japan) Team Suzuki Ecstar (1)	(Italy) Sky Racing Team VR46* (1)	(Luxembourg) Leopard Racing* (2)
2021	(Italy) Ducati Lenovo Team* (2)	(Finland) Red Bull KTM Ajo (2)	(Finland) Red Bull KTM Ajo (1)
2022	(Italy) Ducati Lenovo Team (3)	(Finland) Red Bull KTM Ajo (3)	(Spain) GasGas Aspar Team (1)

Year	MotoGP	Moto2	Moto3	MotoE
2023	(Italy) Prima Pramac Racing* (1)	(Finland) Red Bull KTM Ajo (4)	(Germany) Liqui Moly Husqvarna Intact GP* (1)	(Spain) HP Pons Los40 (1)
2024	(Italy) Ducati Lenovo Team* (4)	(Spain) MT Helmets – MSi (1)	(Spain) CFMoto Aspar Team (2)	(Germany) Dynavolt Intact GP MotoE (1)
2025	(Italy) Ducati Lenovo Team (5)	(Italy) Fantic Racing* (1)	(Finland) Red Bull KTM Ajo (2)	(Monaco) LCR E-Team* (1)

Year	MotoGP	Moto2	Moto3
2026	(Italy) Aprilia Racing* (1)		(Spain) CFMoto Aspar Team (3)

== By team ==
Teams in bold are participating in any of the classes of the 2026 World Championship.

Team	MotoGP	Moto2	Moto3	MotoE	Total
(Japan) **Honda HRC Castrol**	10				10
(Japan) **Yamaha Motor Racing**	7				7
(Finland) **Ajo Motorsport**		4	2		6
(Italy) **Ducati Corse**	5				5
(Spain) **Aspar Team**			3		3
(Spain) Pons Racing		1		1	2
(Luxembourg) **Leopard Racing**			2		2
(Germany) **Intact GP**			1	1	2
(Japan) Suzuki MotoGP	1				1
(Italy) **Pramac Racing**	1				1
(Italy) **Aprilia Racing**	1				1
(Italy) **VR46 Racing Team**		1			1
(Spain) **MT Helmets – MSi**		1			1
(Italy) **Fantic Racing**		1			1
(Italy) **Gresini Racing**			1		1
(Monaco) **LCR Team**				1	1
Total	25	8	9	3	45

== By country ==
Countries in bold have a team of that nationality participating in any of the classes of the 2026 World Championship.

Country	MotoGP	Moto2	Moto3	MotoE	Total
Japan	18				18
Italy	7	2	1		10
Finland		4	2		6
Spain		2	3	1	6
Luxembourg			2		2
Germany			1	1	2
Monaco				1	1
Total	25	8	9	3	45
