= Aprilia RS-GP =

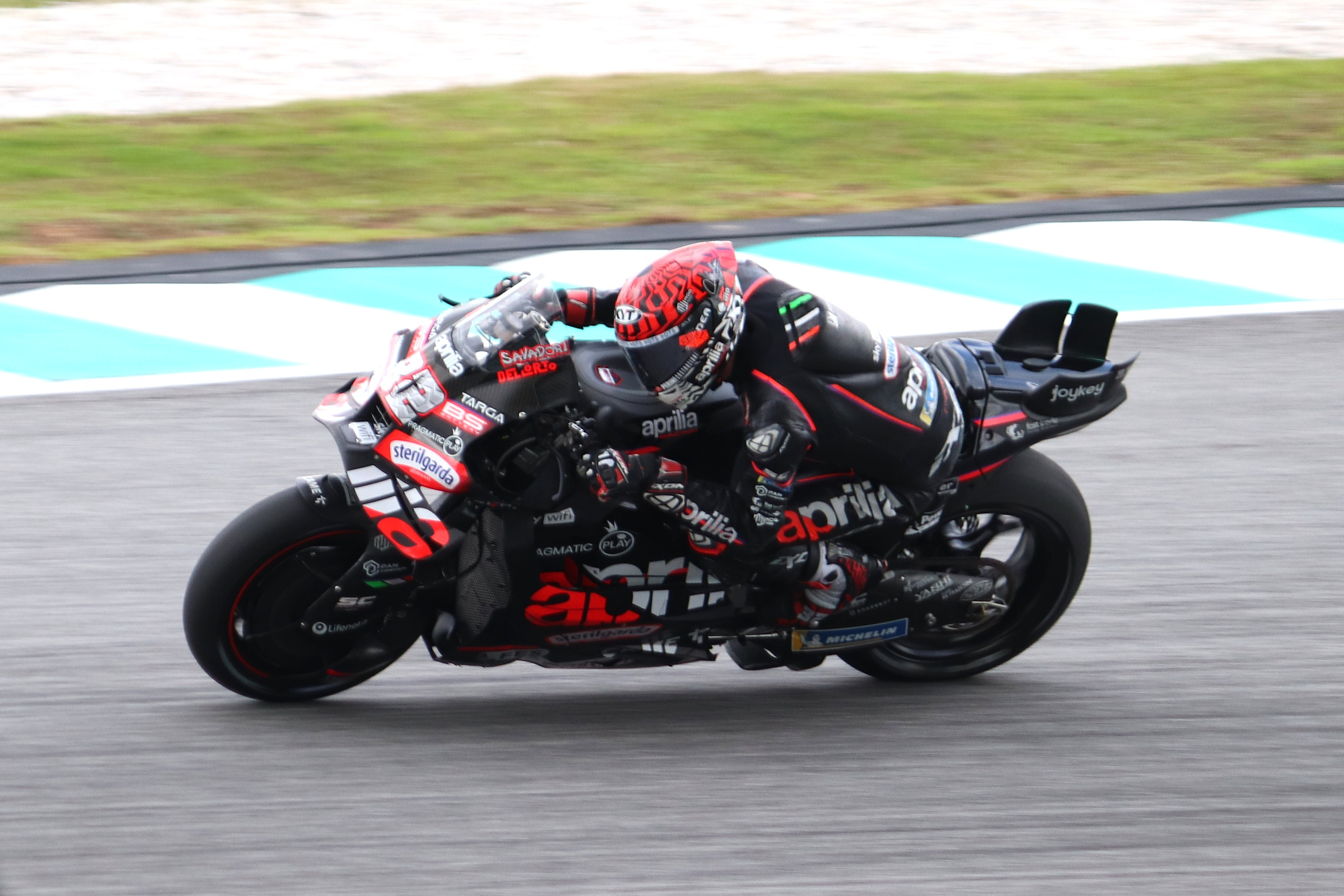
- Lorenzo Savadori riding Aprilia RS-GP at Sepang 2025
- Manufacturer: Aprilia
- Parent company: Piaggio
- Production: since 2015
- Predecessor: Aprilia RS Cube
- Class: MotoGP Prototype
- Engine: 1,000 cc (61 cu in) four-stroke 75°/90°V4
- Transmission: 6-speed
- Weight: 160 kg (dry)
- Fuel capacity: 22 litres

The Aprilia RS-GP is the name of the series of four-stroke V4 Prototype motorcycles developed by Aprilia to compete in the MotoGP World Championship, starting from 2015 season.

== History ==
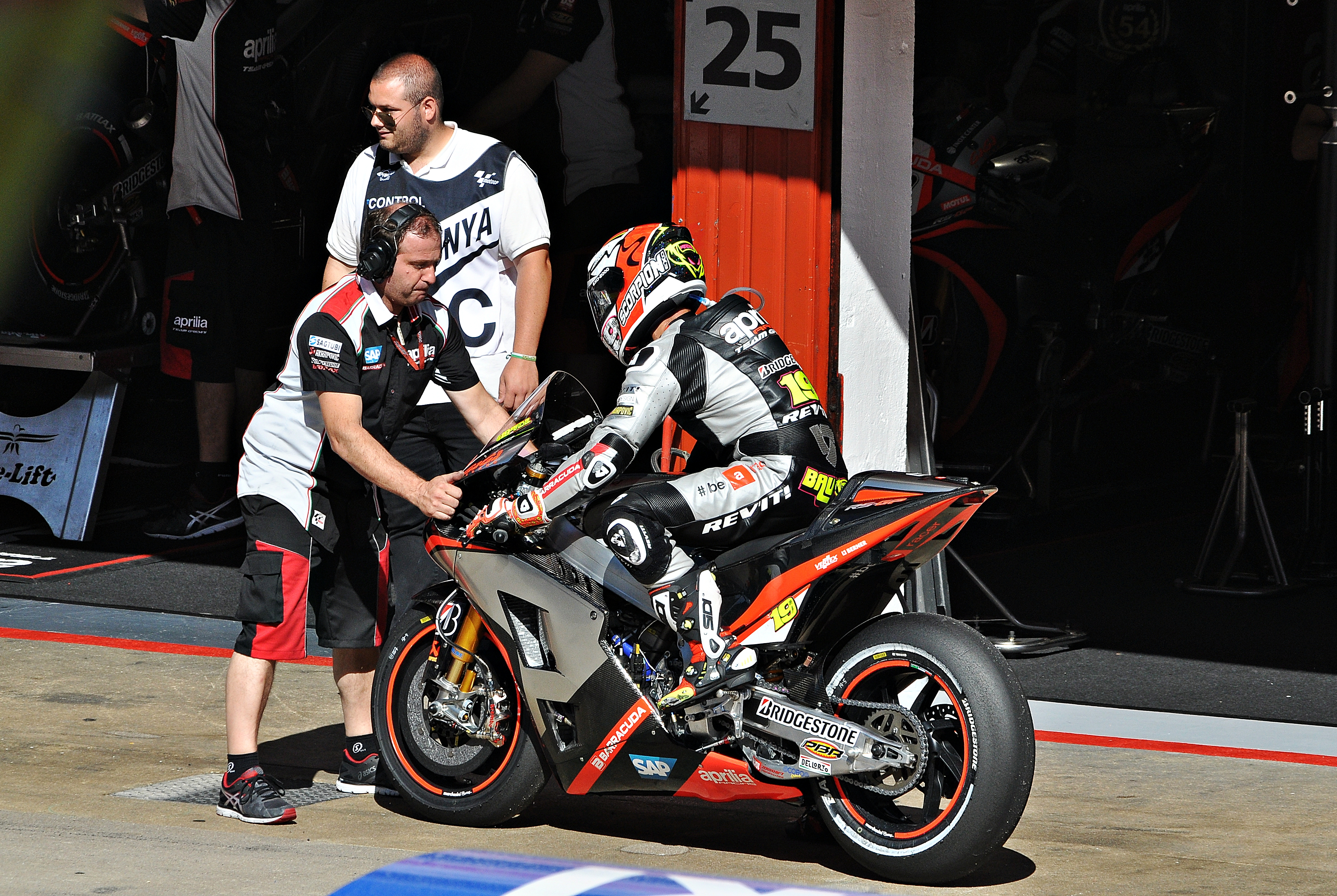
Álvaro Bautista riding his 2015 RS-GP

For 2015, Aprilia returned to the world championship supplying Aprilia Racing Team Gresini with two RS-GP bikes for riders Álvaro Bautista and Marco Melandri, who made a comeback since he last competed in the premier class back in 2010.

For 2016, Aprilia stayed in MotoGP but this time the 2011 Moto2 World Champion, Stefan Bradl, joined the Aprilia squad, having competed with the team from 2015 Indianapolis Grand Prix onward.

On March 26, 2017, the RS-GP achieved its best result yet, having finished in 6th place in the 2017 Qatar Grand Prix with Aleix Espargaró after starting the race from 15 on the grid, the same feat occurred in 2018 at Aragon when Espargaró achieved another P6 result.

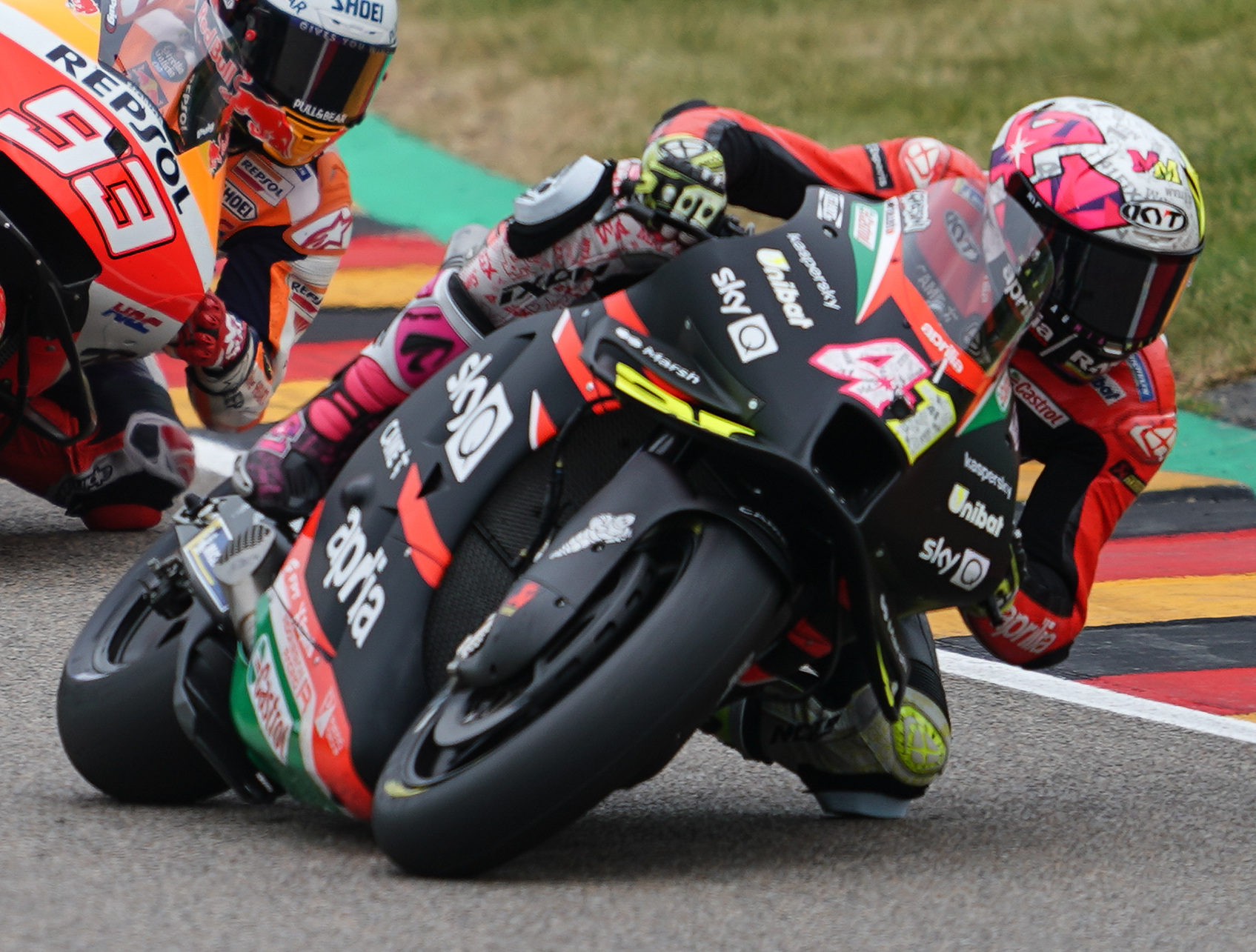
Aleix Espargaró on his 2021 RS-GP

During the 2021 season, the RS-GP saw major improvements and results primarily by Espargaró as opposed to the results in 2018 through to 2020.

The RS-GP once again achieved 2 more P6 finishes in Portimão and Jerez by Espargaró once again and saw consistent top 10 finishes by Espargaró while former test rider Lorenzo Savadori who was promoted after Bradley Smith left, only saw his personal best results within the top 15 with 2 15th-place finishes and a 14th-place finish.

The RS-GP also achieved its best qualifying result within the top 3 in the MotoGP era with Espargaró starting 3rd behind Fabio Quartararo in 2nd and Johan Zarco in 1st.

At the British GP, Espargaró earned both Aprilia and the RS-GP its first-ever podium finish in 3rd in the Modern MotoGP 4-stroke era and Aprilia's first podium finish in the premier class since Jeremy McWilliams in 2000.

In 2022, another bout of improvements to the RS-GP saw it qualify on pole position and for the Argentine GP. Rider Aleix Espargaró then went on to win the race. This was not only the first win for Aprilia in MotoGP, but the first win for Espargaró in 200 starts.

For 2025, Aprilia signed reigning World Champion Jorge Martín from Pramac Ducati.

== Specifications ==
Aprilia RS-GP Specifications
Engine
Engine type:	Four-stroke V4 75° (90° since 2020), liquid-cooled, DOHC, pneumatic valves, gear drive
Displacement:	1,000 cc (61 cu in)
ECU:	Magneti Marelli
Fuel System:	Fuel injection
Fuel:	BP
Lubricants:	Motul (2015–2017); Gulf (Gresini; 2018–2020) & (Trackhouse; 2025–present); Castrol (Gresini/Factory; 2021-present) & (RNF/Trackhouse; 2023–2024)
Lubrication system:	Wet sump
Data recording:	2D
Maximum power:	255 PS
Maximum speed:	368.6 km/h (229.0 mph)
Exhaust:	Akrapovič (2015–2021); SC Project (2022-present)
Transmission
Type:	6-speed cassette-type gearbox, with alternative gear ratios available
Primary drive:	Gear
Clutch:	Dry multi-plate slipper clutch
Final drive:	Regina Chain titanium PBR sprocket
Chassis and running gear
Frame type:	Aluminium twin-tube frame, Carbon fiber swingarm
Front suspension:	Öhlins Magnesium, fully-adjustable telescopic fork
Rear suspension:	Öhlins Pro-link, fully-adjustable monoshock
Front/rear wheels:	17” inch front and rear
Front/rear tyres:	Michelin
Front brake:	Brembo
Rear brake:	Brembo
Weight:	160 kg (353 lb) in accordance with FIM regulations
Fuel capacity:	22 L (6 US gal; 5 imp gal), in accordance with FIM regulations
Accessories:	BARRACUDA

== Complete MotoGP results ==
(key) (results in bold indicate pole position; results in italics indicate fastest lap)

Year	Tyres	Team	No.	Rider	1	2	3	4	5	6	7	8	9	10	11	12	13	14	15	16	17	18	19	20	21	22	Points	RC	Points	TC	Points	MC
2015	B				QAT	AME	ARG	ESP	FRA	ITA	CAT	NED	GER	IND	CZE	GBR	RSM	ARA	JPN	AUS	MAL	VAL										
2015	B	(Italy) Aprilia Racing Team Gresini	6	(Germany) Stefan Bradl										20	14	Ret	16	18	18	21	10	18					8 (17)	18th	39	11th	36	5th
2015	B	(Italy) Aprilia Racing Team Gresini	19	(Spain) Álvaro Bautista	Ret	15	19	15	15	14	10	17	14	18	13	10	15	13	16	14	15	14					31	16th	39	11th	36	5th
2015	B	(Italy) Aprilia Racing Team Gresini	33	(Italy) Marco Melandri	21	Ret	20	19	18	18	Ret	19															0	NC	39	11th	36	5th
2015	B	(Italy) Aprilia Racing Team Gresini	70	(Republic of Ireland) Michael Laverty									20														0	NC	39	11th	36	5th
2016	M				QAT	ARG	AME	ESP	FRA	ITA	CAT	NED	GER	AUT	CZE	GBR	RSM	ARA	MAL	JPN	AUS	VAL										
2016	M	(Italy) Aprilia Racing Team Gresini	6	(Germany) Stefan Bradl	Ret	7	10	14	10	14	12	8	DNS	19	14	Ret	12	10	10	11	17	13					63	16th	145	7th	101	5th
2016	M	(Italy) Aprilia Racing Team Gresini	19	(Spain) Álvaro Bautista	13	10	11	Ret	9	Ret	8	Ret	10	16	16	10	10	9	7	12	7	10					82	12th	145	7th	101	5th
2017	M				QAT	ARG	AME	ESP	FRA	ITA	CAT	NED	GER	CZE	AUT	GBR	RSM	ARA	JPN	AUS	MAL	VAL										
2017	M	(Italy) Aprilia Racing Team Gresini	22	(United Kingdom) Sam Lowes	18	Ret	Ret	16	14	19	19	Ret	Ret	18	20	Ret	Ret	20	13	19	Ret	Ret					5	25th	67	12th	64	6th
2017	M	(Italy) Aprilia Racing Team Gresini	41	(Spain) Aleix Espargaró	6	Ret	16	9	Ret	Ret	Ret	10	7	8	13	Ret	Ret	6	7	Ret		Ret					62	15th	67	12th	64	6th
2018	M				QAT	ARG	AME	SPA	FRA	ITA	CAT	NED	GER	CZE	AUT	GBR	RSM	ARA	THA	JPN	AUS	MAL	VAL									
2018	M	(Italy) Aprilia Racing Team Gresini	41	(Spain) Aleix Espargaró	19	Ret	10	Ret	9	Ret	Ret	13	DNS	15	17	C	14	6	13	Ret	9	11	Ret				44	17th	64	10th	59	6th
2018	M	(Italy) Aprilia Racing Team Gresini	45	(United Kingdom) Scott Redding	20	12	17	15	Ret	Ret	12	14	15	Ret	20	C	21	16	16	19	13	19	11				20	21st	64	10th	59	6th
2019	M				QAT	ARG	AME	SPA	FRA	ITA	CAT	NED	GER	CZE	AUT	GBR	RSM	ARA	THA	JPN	AUS	MAL	VAL									
2019	M	(Italy) Aprilia Racing Team Gresini	29	(Italy) Andrea Iannone	14	17	12	DNS	Ret	15	11	10	13	17	16	10	DNS	11	15	Ret	6	Ret	Ret				43	16th	106	9th	88	6th
2019	M	(Italy) Aprilia Racing Team Gresini	41	(Spain) Aleix Espargaró	10	9	Ret	11	12	11	Ret	12	Ret	18	14	Ret	12	7	Ret	15	10	13	9				63	14th	106	9th	88	6th
2019	M	(Italy) Aprilia Factory Racing (Italy) Aprilia Racing Team	38	(United Kingdom) Bradley Smith	Ret			17			Ret							19									0	NC	106	9th	88	6th
2020	M				SPA	ANC	CZE	AUT	STY	RSM	EMI	CAT	FRA	ARA	TER	EUR	VAL	POR														
2020	M	(Italy) Aprilia Racing Team Gresini	32	(Italy) Lorenzo Savadori												Ret	18	Ret									0	NC	54	11th	51	6th
2020	M	(Italy) Aprilia Racing Team Gresini	38	(United Kingdom) Bradley Smith	15	12	17	13	19	19	13	16	Ret	19	15												12	21st	54	11th	51	6th
2020	M	(Italy) Aprilia Racing Team Gresini	41	(Spain) Aleix Espargaró	Ret	Ret	10	11	12	13	Ret	12	14	13	Ret	Ret	9	8									42	17th	54	11th	51	6th
2021	M				QAT	DOH	POR	SPA	FRA	ITA	CAT	GER	NED	STY	AUT	GBR	ARA	RSM	AME	MAL	ALG	VAL										
2021	M	(Italy) Aprilia Racing Team Gresini	12	(Spain) Maverick Viñales													18	13		8	16	16					11 (106) (Note: Non-bracketed number refers to the number accumulated with the team, with number in brackets referring to the total accumulated for the season.)	10th	135	9th	121	6th
2021	M	(Italy) Aprilia Racing Team Gresini	32	(Italy) Lorenzo Savadori	19	20	14	19	Ret	15	15	Ret	16	DNS		DNS											4	26th	135	9th	121	6th
2021	M	(Italy) Aprilia Racing Team Gresini	41	(Spain) Aleix Espargaró	7	10	6	6	Ret	7	Ret	7	8	Ret	10	3	4	8	Ret	7	Ret	9					120	8th	135	9th	121	6th
2022	M				QAT	INA	ARG	AME	POR	SPA	FRA	ITA	CAT	GER	NED	GBR	AUT	RSM	ARA	JPN	THA	AUS	MAL	VAL								
2022	M	(Italy) Aprilia Racing	12	(Spain) Maverick Viñales	12	16	7	10	10	14	10	12	7	Ret	3	2	13	3	13	7	7	17	16	Ret			122	11th	334	3rd	248	3rd
2022	M	(Italy) Aprilia Racing	32	(Italy) Lorenzo Savadori					Ret	21		22			20		19										0	28th	334	3rd	248	3rd
2022	M	(Italy) Aprilia Racing	41	(Spain) Aleix Espargaró	4	9	**1**	11	3	3	3	3	**4**	4	4	9	6	6	3	16	11	9	10	Ret			212	4th	334	3rd	248	3rd
2023	M				POR	ARG	AME	SPA	FRA	ITA	GER	NED	GBR	AUT	CAT	RSM	IND	JPN	INA	AUS	THA	MAL	QAT	VAL								
2023	M	(Italy) Aprilia Racing	12	(Spain) Maverick Viñales	2^{5}	12^{7}	4	Ret^{7}	Ret^{9}	12	Ret	Ret^{7}	5^{3}	6^{8}	2^{3}	5^{6}	8^{8}	19^{9}	2^{4}	11	Ret	11	4^{6}	**10**^{4}			204	7th	410	5th	326	3rd
2023	M	(Italy) Aprilia Racing	41	(Spain) Aleix Espargaró	9^{6}	15	Ret^{4}	**5**	5^{8}	6^{8}	16^{9}	3^{4}	1^{5}	9^{7}	1^{1}	12^{8}	Ret	5	10	8	8^{5}	Ret	Ret	8			206	6th	410	5th	326	3rd
2023	M	(Italy) Aprilia Racing	32	(Italy) Lorenzo Savadori						18		11		19													5 (12)	24th	—N/a		326	3rd
2023	M	(Malaysia) CryptoData RNF MotoGP Team	32	(Italy) Lorenzo Savadori					12															13			4 (12)	24th	134	8th	326	3rd
2023	M	(Malaysia) CryptoData RNF MotoGP Team	25	(Spain) Raúl Fernández	Ret	14	Ret	15	WD	17	15	12	10	Ret	Ret	8	10^{9}	9	13	16	15	Ret	17	5			51	20th	134	8th	326	3rd
2023	M	(Malaysia) CryptoData RNF MotoGP Team	88	(Portugal) Miguel Oliveira	Ret^{7}		5^{8}	Ret^{5}		Ret	10	Ret	4	Ret	5^{6}	6	12	18	12	13	Ret	Ret	DNS				76	16th	134	8th	326	3rd
2024	M				QAT	POR	AME	SPA	FRA	CAT	ITA	NED	GER	GBR	AUT	ARA	RSM	EMI	INA	JPN	AUS	THA	MAL	SLD								
2024	M	(Italy) Aprilia Racing	12	(Spain) Maverick Viñales	10^{9}	Ret^{1}	**1**^{1}	9	5^{3}	12^{8}	8^{5}	5^{3}	12^{7}	13^{8}	7	Ret	16	6	6^{7}	Ret^{9}	8	7	7	15			190	7th	353	4th	302	3rd
2024	M	(Italy) Aprilia Racing	41	(Spain) Aleix Espargaró	8^{3}	8^{8}	7^{5}	Ret	9^{5}	**4**^{1}	11^{9}	DNS	WD	**6**^{3}	9^{3}	10	Ret	8	Ret	9	16^{8}	9	13	5^{4}			163	11th	353	4th	302	3rd
2024	M	(Italy) Aprilia Racing	32	(Italy) Lorenzo Savadori				Ret			21	DNS			20												0 (0)	28th	—N/a		302	3rd
2024	M	(United States) Trackhouse Racing	32	(Italy) Lorenzo Savadori																Ret	Ret	Ret	18				0 (0)	28th	141	9th	302	3rd
2024	M	(United States) Trackhouse Racing	25	(Spain) Raúl Fernández	Ret	Ret	10^{9}	11	11^{9}	6	12	8	10	Ret	Ret	16	18	13	10	15	10^{6}	Ret	16	18			66	16th	141	9th	302	3rd
2024	M	(United States) Trackhouse Racing	88	(Portugal) Miguel Oliveira	15	9	11	8^{8}	Ret	10	14	15	6^{2}	Ret	12	Ret^{5}	11	10	DNS					12			75	15th	141	9th	302	3rd
2025	M				THA	ARG	AME	QAT	SPA	FRA	GBR	ARA	ITA	NED	GER	CZE	AUT	HUN	CAT	RSM	JPN	INA	AUS	MAL	POR	VAL						
2025	M	(Italy) Aprilia Racing	1	(Spain) Jorge Martín				Ret								7	Ret	4^{9}	10	13^{8}	DNS					Ret	34	21st	395	5th	418	2nd
2025	M	(Italy) Aprilia Racing	72	(Italy) Marco Bezzecchi	6	Ret^{6}	6	9^{9}	14^{8}	14	1^{4}	8^{8}	5^{6}	2^{3}	Ret^{2}	2^{4}	**3**^{4}	3^{7}	Ret	2^{1}	4	**Ret**^{1}	3^{1}	11^{6}	**1**^{3}	**1**^{5}	353	3rd	395	5th	418	2nd
2025	M	(Italy) Aprilia Racing	32	(Italy) Lorenzo Savadori	20	DNS	15		18	9	18	17	17	Ret	Ret				Ret				16	16	16		8	24th	395	5th	418	2nd
2025	M	(United States) Trackhouse MotoGP Team	25	(Spain) Raúl Fernández	Ret	15	12	17	15	7	12	10	7^{8}	8	9	5^{6}	9	Ret	11	11^{9}	7^{8}	6^{3}	1^{2}	Ret	WD	2^{4}	172	10th	261	7th	418	2nd
2025	M	(United States) Trackhouse MotoGP Team	79	(Japan) Ai Ogura	5^{4}	DSQ	9^{9}	15^{7}	8	10	DNS		10	Ret	Ret	14	14	11	6^{9}	Ret	DNS^{9}		13	10	7	Ret^{9}	89	17th	261	7th	418	2nd
2026	M				THA	BRA	USA	SPA	FRA	CAT	ITA	HUN	CZE	NED	GER	GBR	ARA	RSM	AUT	JPN	INA	AUS	MAL	QAT	POR	VAL						
2026	M	(Italy) Aprilia Racing	72	(Italy) Marco Bezzecchi	**1**	1^{4}	1	2	2^{3}	4^{9}	**1**^{4}	Ret^{3}	EX	Ret^{4}	DNS	3^{3}	**3**^{3}	**Ret**^{2}	3^{3}	3^{3}	1	C**^{4}**	6**^{3}**	**1**			357*	3rd*	728*	1st*	561*	2nd*
2026	M	(Italy) Aprilia Racing	89	(Spain) Jorge Martín	4^{5}	2^{3}	2^{1}	4	1^{1}	NC	2^{2}	Ret^{6}	9^{5}	**3**^{5}	5^{6}	**2**^{1}	5^{5}	5^{3}	**2**^{1}	**2**^{3}	3^{4}	C	DNS	7**^{3}**			371*	2nd*	728*	1st*	561*	2nd*
2026	M	(Italy) Aprilia Racing	32	(Italy) Lorenzo Savadori				Ret									17										0*	31st*	728*	1st*	561*	2nd*
2026	M	(United States) Trackhouse MotoGP Team	25	(Spain) Raúl Fernández	3^{3}	10	8^{7}	6^{6}	8	17	8^{1}	Ret^{4}	7^{6}	2^{1}	3^{5}	1	Ret^{8}	6^{7}	12	5^{8}	**2**	C	DNS	3**^{4}**			258*	7th*	552*	3rd*	561*	2nd*
2026	M	(United States) Trackhouse MotoGP Team	79	(Japan) Ai Ogura	5^{4}	5^{5}	Ret^{6}	5	3^{7}	8^{8}	4^{8}	4	**2^{2}**	1^{2}	2^{4}	Ret^{2}			4**^{4}**	6**^{5}**	4**^{2}**	C	4**^{4}**	4**^{7}**			294*	5th*	552*	3rd*	561*	2nd*

== See also ==
- KTM RC16
- Honda RC213V
- Suzuki GSX-RR
- Yamaha YZR-M1
- Ducati Desmosedici
