= Aprilia Racing =

Motorcycle racing team

- 2026 name: Aprilia Racing
- Base: Scorzè, Italy
- Principal: Massimo Rivola
- Racing manager: Paolo Bonora
- Rider(s): MotoGP: 72. Marco Bezzecchi; 89. Jorge Martin; 32. Lorenzo Savadori (test rider)
- Motorcycle: Aprilia RS-GP
- Tyres: Michelin
- Constructors' Championships: See Below
- Riders' Championships: See Below
- Teams' Championships: MotoGP: 1; 2026

Aprilia Racing is a motorcycle racing factory team of competing in the MotoGP World Championship owned by Aprilia, subsequently by the Piaggio Group.

== History ==
Despite being a relatively small company by global motorcycling standards, Aprilia is very active in motorcycle sports. It contested many Road Racing formulae, including the now-defunct 125 cc, 250 cc and 500 cc Grand Prix classes of the FIM World Championship. From 2002 to 2004, they participated in the FIM MotoGP World Championship, and from 1999 to 2002, they participated in the FIM Superbike World Championship. Aprilia has returned to World Superbike since the 2009 season and in MotoGP since the 2012 season.

Aprilia also feature in the off-road racing world, with their 450 cc V-2 motocrosser producing respectable results (including race wins) in both off-road (Motocross) and on-road (Supermoto) categories.

Aprilia made their international racing debut in the Motocross World Championship competing in the 125cc class from 1976 until 1981 with a best result being a fifth place in the 1979 season with rider Corrado Maddi. The firm then focused on the Grand Prix road racing world championships in 1985 and since then it has seen varying successes. Aprilia won their first world championship race at the 1987 San Marino motorcycle Grand Prix with rider Loris Reggiani winning the 250cc race. In 1992, they won their first road racing world championship with Gramigni winning the 125cc class. They continued to be successful in the smaller displacement categories, winning numerous races and championships in the 125 cc and 250 cc Grand Prix classes.

However, their 500 cc Grand Prix bikes failed to attain the same success. They began campaigning in the 500cc class in 1994 with a 250 V twin motor enlarged to 380cc in hopes of using its lighter weight and nimble handling as an advantage against the heavier, V4 engine bikes used by the competition. The bike eventually displaced 430cc and had its best result with a third place by rider Doriano Romboni at the 1997 Dutch TT but, could never overcome power disadvantage during the starting line sprint and was withdrawn at the end of the 1997 season for further development. Their first MotoGP effort, dubbed the RS Cube, was technically advanced but difficult to ride and performed poorly in the championship. The Cube did, however, pioneer many advanced technologies including ride by wire throttle and pneumatic valve actuation systems. Aprilia left the MotoGP class at the end of 2004 and then left the lower classes when two-stroke engines were banned. Aprilia set the record for the most points earned by a manufacturer in a single season from the 125cc class with 410 points in 2007. It was also the highest points earned by a constructor in Grand Prix motorcycle racing's history until 2011 when 420 points were won by the same bikes winning 16 out of 17 races.

The company is also notable for choosing atypical engine configurations. For example, they progressed with development of a V-2 500 cc Grand Prix bike when other teams were moving to V-4 configurations for what some believed was better and more usable power outputs. Aprilia continued this trend, taking advantage of lighter minimum weights with the introduction of their RS Cube MotoGP bike – featuring three cylinders in an inline triple layout, the bike had the fewest cylinders on the Grand Prix paddock.

Aprilia rejoined the MotoGP class in 2012, taking advantage of the newly introduced Claiming Rule Team category that encouraged independent teams with lower budgets to use bikes from manufacturers not officially involved in MotoGP. Aprilia supplied RSV4 SBK-derived bikes under the ART (Aprilia Racing Technology) name to Aspar Team, Paul Bird Motorsport and Speed Master teams. In both the 2012 and 2013 seasons Aprilia's ART machinery stood out as the best CRT bikes.

In 2015, Aprilia partnered with Gresini Racing as a factory-supported independent team. The team competed as the Aprilia Racing Team Gresini with an all-new 1000cc V4-engined RS-GP.

In 2022, Aprilia entered the series as an official factory team for the first time since 2004. Their previously supported Gresini Racing team returned to a fully-independent team using Ducati bikes. Aprilia's factory team is named Aprilia Racing.

== MotoGP ==
Aprilia entered the Grand Prix road racing world championships in 1985 and since then it has seen varying successes.

On 15 August 2010, Aprilia became the most successful motorcycle racing brand in history, surpassing fellow Italian MV Agusta with a record 276th victory.

=== Early times ===
==== 500 cc class ====
Aprilia began campaigning in the 500cc class in 1994 with a 250 V twin motor enlarged to 380cc in hopes of using its lighter weight and nimble handling as an advantage against the heavier, V4 engine bikes used by the competition.

The bike eventually displaced 430cc and had its best result with a third place by rider Doriano Romboni at the 1997 Dutch TT but, could never overcome power disadvantage during the starting line sprint and was withdrawn at the end of the 1997 season for further development.

=== As MotoGP ===
Many world champions started on Aprilia such as Biaggi, Capirossi, Gramigni, Locatelli, Sakata and Rossi.

==== First venture ====
While having a technically advanced bike, Aprilia performed poorly in the championship in their first MotoGP effort.

They left the MotoGP class at the end of 2004 and then left the lower classes when two-stroke engines were banned.

==== Second Attempt ====
Aprilia rejoined the MotoGP class in 2012 in the Claiming Rule Team category.

In 2022, Aprilia entered the series as an official factory team as "Aprilia Racing" for the first time since 2004, and won its premier class grand prix at Argentina with Aleix Espargaró. A first-ever 1-2 result in a feature race was secured by Espargaró and Maverick Viñales at the 2023 Catalan Grand Prix.

In 2025, defending riders' champion Jorge Martín signed for the factory team from Pramac Racing replacing the retiring Aleix Espargaró. Marco Bezzecchi also joined from the VR46 Racing Team, winning the British Grand Prix in his debut season with Aprilia. Bezzecchi would also win the final two races in Portugal and Valencia, giving Aprilia their first ever back-to-back wins in the premier class.

In March 2026, Aprilia Racing achieved a one-two finish at the 2026 United States motorcycle Grand Prix in Austin, with Marco Bezzecchi winning the race and Jorge Martín finishing second. Martín also won the sprint race, marking his first sprint victory with the team.

For 2027, Aprilia Racing will retain Marco Bezzecchi while signing Francesco Bagnaia, who moves from the Ducati factory team.

== Results ==
=== MotoGP results ===
==== By rider ====
Year	Class	Team name	Bike	Riders	Races	Wins	Podiums	Poles	F. laps	Points	Pos.
2022	MotoGP	Aprilia Racing	Aprilia RS-GP	(Spain) Maverick Vinales	20	0	3	0	0	122	11th
2022	MotoGP	Aprilia Racing	Aprilia RS-GP	(Spain) Aleix Espargaró	20	1	6	2	2	212	4th
2023	MotoGP	Aprilia Racing	Aprilia RS-GP	(Spain) Maverick Viñales	20	0	3	1	1	204	7th
2023	MotoGP	Aprilia Racing	Aprilia RS-GP	(Spain) Aleix Espargaró	20	2	3	1	2	206	6th
2023	MotoGP	Aprilia Racing	Aprilia RS-GP	(Italy) Lorenzo Savadori	3	0	0	0	0	9 (12)	24th
2024	MotoGP	Aprilia Racing	Aprilia RS-GP	(Spain) Maverick Viñales	19	1	1	1	1	189	7th
2024	MotoGP	Aprilia Racing	Aprilia RS-GP	(Spain) Aleix Espargaró	19	0	0	2	1	134	11th
2024	MotoGP	Aprilia Racing	Aprilia RS-GP	(Italy) Lorenzo Savadori	3	0	0	0	0	0 (0)	28th
2025	MotoGP	Aprilia Racing	Aprilia RS-GP	(Spain) Jorge Martin	7	0	0	0	0	34	21st
2025	MotoGP	Aprilia Racing	Aprilia RS-GP	(Italy) Marco Bezzecchi	22	3	9	5	2	353	3rd
2025	MotoGP	Aprilia Racing	Aprilia RS-GP	(Italy) Lorenzo Savadori	13	0	0	0	0	8	24th
2026	MotoGP	Aprilia Racing	Aprilia RS-GP	(Spain) Jorge Martin	18	1	9	4	0	371*	2nd*
2026	MotoGP	Aprilia Racing	Aprilia RS-GP	(Italy) Marco Bezzecchi	17	6	12	5	3	357*	3rd*
2026	MotoGP	Aprilia Racing	Aprilia RS-GP	(Italy) Lorenzo Savadori	1	0	0	0	0	0*	31st*

==== By season ====
(key) (Races in bold indicate pole position; races in italics indicate fastest lap)

Year	Motorcycle	Tyres	Riders	1	2	3	4	5	6	7	8	9	10	11	12	13	14	15	16	17	18	19	20	21	22	Points	RC	Points	TC	Points	MC
2022	Aprilia RS-GP	M		QAT	INA	ARG	AME	POR	SPA	FRA	ITA	CAT	GER	NED	GBR	AUT	RSM	ARA	JPN	THA	AUS	MAL	VAL								
2022	Aprilia RS-GP	M	(Spain) Aleix Espargaró	4	9	**1**	11	3	3	3	3	**5**	4	4	9	6	6	3	16	11	9	10	Ret			212	4th	334	3rd	248	3rd
2022	Aprilia RS-GP	M	(Spain) Maverick Viñales	12	16	7	10	10	14	10	12	7	Ret	3	2	13	3	13	7	7	17	16	Ret			122	11th	334	3rd	248	3rd
2022	Aprilia RS-GP	M	(Italy) Lorenzo Savadori					Ret	21		22			20		19										0	NC	—N/a		248	3rd
2023	Aprilia RS-GP	M		POR	ARG	AME	SPA	FRA	ITA	GER	NED	GBR	AUT	CAT	RSM	IND	JPN	INA	AUS	THA	MAL	QAT	VAL								
2023	Aprilia RS-GP	M	(Spain) Maverick Viñales	2^{5}	12^{7}	4	Ret^{7}	Ret^{9}	12	Ret	Ret^{7}	5^{3}	6^{8}	2^{3}	5^{6}	8^{8}	19^{9}	2^{4}	11	Ret	11	4^{6}	**10**^{4}			204	7th	410	5th	326	3rd
2023	Aprilia RS-GP	M	(Spain) Aleix Espargaró	9^{6}	15	Ret^{4}	**5**	5^{8}	6^{8}	16^{9}	3^{4}	1^{5}	9^{7}	1^{1}	12^{8}	Ret	5	10	8	8^{5}	Ret	Ret	8			206	6th	410	5th	326	3rd
2023	Aprilia RS-GP	M	(Italy) Lorenzo Savadori						18		11		19													5 (12)	24th	—N/a		326	3rd
2024	Aprilia RS-GP	M		QAT	POR	AME	SPA	FRA	CAT	ITA	NED	GER	GBR	AUT	ARA	RSM	EMI	INA	JPN	AUS	THA	MAL	SLD								
2024	Aprilia RS-GP	M	(Spain) Maverick Viñales	10^{9}	Ret^{1}	**1**^{1}	9	5^{3}	12^{8}	8^{5}	5^{3}	12^{7}	13^{8}	7	Ret	16	6	6^{7}	Ret^{9}	8	7	7	15			189	7th	335	4th	285	3rd
2024	Aprilia RS-GP	M	(Spain) Aleix Espargaró	8^{3}	8^{8}	7^{5}	Ret	9^{5}	**4**^{1}	11^{9}	DNS	WD	**6**^{3}	9^{3}	10	Ret	8	Ret	9	16^{8}	9	13	5^{4}			134	11th	335	4th	285	3rd
2024	Aprilia RS-GP	M	(Italy) Lorenzo Savadori				Ret			21	DNS			20												0 (0)	28th	—N/a		285	3rd
2025	Aprilia RS-GP	M		THA	ARG	AME	QAT	SPA	FRA	GBR	ARA	ITA	NED	GER	CZE	AUT	HUN	CAT	RSM	JPN	INA	AUS	MAL	POR	VAL						
2025	Aprilia RS-GP	M	(Spain) Jorge Martin				Ret								7	Ret	4^{9}	10	13^{8}	DNS					Ret	34	21st	395	5th	418	2nd
2025	Aprilia RS-GP	M	(Italy) Marco Bezzecchi	6	Ret^{6}	6	9^{9}	14^{8}	14	1^{4}	8^{8}	5^{6}	2^{3}	Ret^{2}	2^{4}	**3**^{4}	3^{7}	Ret	**2**^{1}	4	**Ret**^{1}	3^{1}	11^{6}	**1**^{3}	**1**^{5}	353	3rd	395	5th	418	2nd
2025	Aprilia RS-GP	M	(Italy) Lorenzo Savadori	20	DNS	15		18	9	18	17	17	Ret	Ret				Ret				16	16	16		8	24th	395	5th	418	2nd
2026	Aprilia RS-GP	M		THA	BRA	USA	SPA	FRA	CAT	ITA	HUN	CZE	NED	GER	GBR	ARA	RSM	AUT	JPN	INA	AUS	MAL	QAT	POR	VAL						
2026	Aprilia RS-GP	M	(Spain) Jorge Martin	4^{5}	2^{3}	2^{1}	4	1^{1}	NC	2^{2}	Ret^{6}	9^{5}	**3**^{5}	5^{6}	**2**^{1}	5^{5}	5^{3}	**2**^{1}	**2**^{3}	3^{4}	C	DNS	7**^{3}**			371*	2nd*	728*	1st*	561*	2nd*
2026	Aprilia RS-GP	M	(Italy) Marco Bezzecchi	**1**	**1**^{4 F}	1	2	2^{3}	4^{9}	**1**^{4}	Ret^{3}	EX	Ret^{4}	DNS	3^{3}	**3**^{3}	**Ret**^{2}	3^{3}	3^{3}	1	C**^{4}**	6**^{3}**	1**^{P}**			357*	3rd*	728*	1st*	561*	2nd*
2026	Aprilia RS-GP	M	(Italy) Lorenzo Savadori				Ret																			0*	31st*	728*	1st*	561*	2nd*

== Other GP classes ==
Aprilia has been successful in the smaller displacement categories, winning numerous races and championships in the 125 cc and 250 cc Grand Prix classes.

=== History ===
Aprilia won their first world championship race at the 1991 Czechoslovak motorcycle Grand Prix with rider Alessandro Gramigni winning the 125cc race.

In 1992, they won their first road racing world championship with Gramigni winning the 125cc class.

Aprilia set the record for the most points earned by a manufacturer in a single season from the 125cc class with 410 points in 2007.

It was also the highest points earned by a constructor in Grand Prix motorcycle racing's history until 2011 when 420 points were won by the same bikes winning 16 out of 17 races.

=== Honours ===
==== Riders' championships ====
Year	Class	Champion	Motorcycle
1992	125cc	(Italy) Alessandro Gramigni	Aprilia RS125R
1994	125cc	(Japan) Kazuto Sakata	Aprilia RS125R
1994	250cc	(Italy) Max Biaggi	Aprilia RSV 250
1994	250cc	(Italy) Max Biaggi	Aprilia RSV 250
1995	250cc	(Italy) Max Biaggi	Aprilia RSV 250
1996	250cc	(Italy) Max Biaggi	Aprilia RSV 250
1997	125cc	(Italy) Valentino Rossi	Aprilia RS125R
1998	125cc	(Japan) Kazuto Sakata	Aprilia RS125R
1998	250cc	(Italy) Loris Capirossi	Aprilia RSV 250
1999	250cc	(Italy) Valentino Rossi	Aprilia RSV 250
2000	125cc	(Italy) Roberto Locatelli	Aprilia RS125R
2002	125cc	(France) Arnaud Vincent	Aprilia RS125R
2002	250cc	(Italy) Marco Melandri	Aprilia RSV 250
2003	250cc	(San Marino) Manuel Poggiali	Aprilia RSV 250
2006	125cc	(Spain) Álvaro Bautista	Aprilia RS125R
2006	250cc	(Spain) Jorge Lorenzo	Aprilia RSW 250
2007	125cc	(Hungary) Gábor Talmácsi	Aprilia RS125R
2007	250cc	(Spain) Jorge Lorenzo	Aprilia RSA 250
2009	125cc	(Spain) Julián Simón	Aprilia RSA 125
2011	125cc	(Spain) Nicolás Terol	Aprilia RSA 125

==== Manufacturers' championships ====
250cc	1995, 1998, 1999, 2002, 2003, 2006, 2007, 2008, 2009	125cc	1996, 1997, 2002, 2003, 2004, 2006, 2007, 2008, 2009, 2011

== Superbike World Championship (SBK) ==
In 1999, Aprilia entered the Superbike World Championship with a homologated special version of the RSV Mille.

They were third in the riders' championship in 2000 with rider Troy Corser, and third in manufacturers' points and fourth in rider points both in 2001 with Corser and in 2002 with Noriyuki Haga. Aprilia retired from the series at the end of that season.

In February 2008, Aprilia debuted a V-4 superbike, the RSV4, for the 2009 Superbike World Championship.

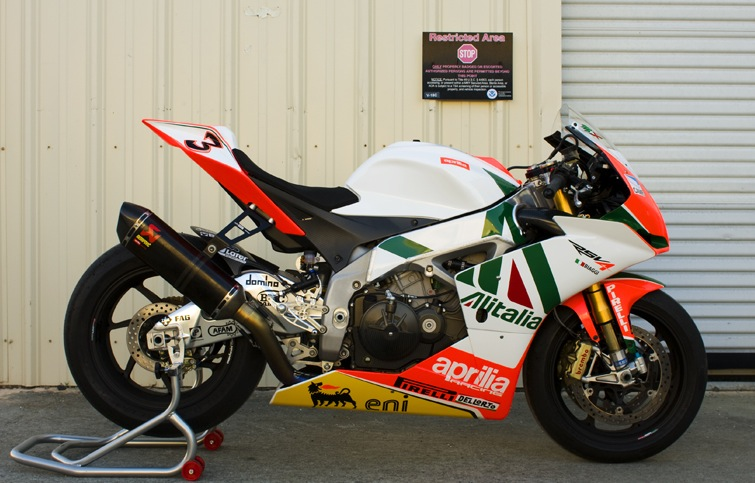
Aprilia RSV4 Factory race bike

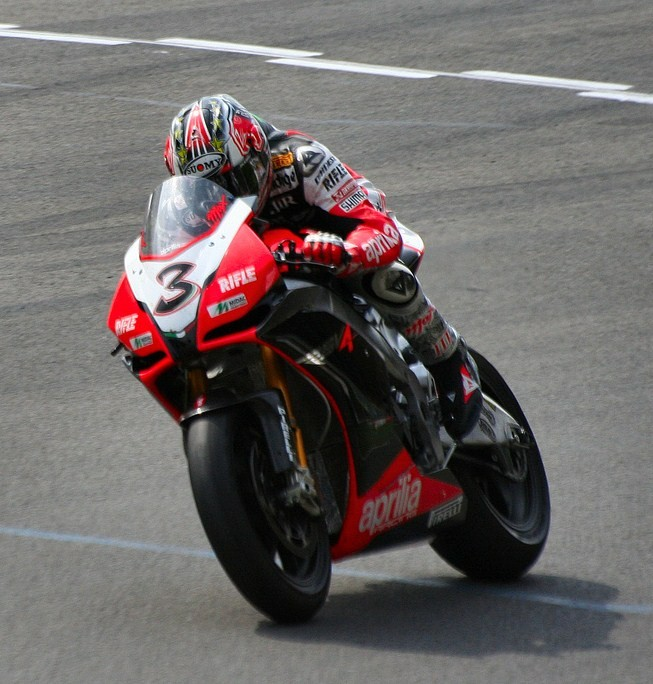
Max Biaggi rides the RSV4

Aprilia won its first Superbike world championship in 2010 with Max Biaggi, claiming both the riders and the manufacturers titles.

=== Riders' championships ===
Year	Champion	Motorcycle
2010	(Italy) Max Biaggi	Aprilia RSV4 1000
2012	(Italy) Max Biaggi	Aprilia RSV4 Factory
2014	(France) Sylvain Guintoli	Aprilia RSV4 Factory

=== Manufacturers' championships ===
- 2010
- 2012
- 2013
- 2014

== Other commitments ==
Aprilia also feature in the off-road racing world, with their 450 cc V-2 motocrosser producing respectable results, including race wins, in both Motocross and Supermoto categories.

=== Grand Prix Motorcycle Racing European Championship ===
Aprilia has also participated in the European championships of various classes having won multiple championships across 250cc and 125cc classes.

Year	250 cc	125 cc
1988	(Italy) Fausto Ricci	
1989	(Italy) Andrea Borgonovo	(Italy) Gabriele Debbia
2004	(Spain) Álvaro Molina	
2005	(Spain) Álvaro Molina	
2006	(Spain) Álvaro Molina	
2007	(Spain) Álvaro Molina	
2008		(Italy) Lorenzo Savadori
2010		(Spain) Maverick Viñales
2011		(Italy) Romano Fenati

=== Superstock 1000 ===
Aprilia has also raced in the FIM Superstock 1000 Championship, having won the series in 2015 with Lorenzo Savadori.

=== Motocross ===
Aprilia made their international racing debut in the Motocross World Championship competing in the 125cc class from 1976 until 1981 with a best result being a fifth place in the 1979 season with rider Corrado Maddi.

With Aprilia, Ivan Alborghetti won the Italian 125 and 250 cc motocross championships in 1977.

=== Trial World Championship ===
Aprilia previously participated in the FIM Trials World Championship.

In 1992, Tommy Ahvala won the World Trials Championship on an Aprilia Climber.

=== SuperMoto World Championship ===
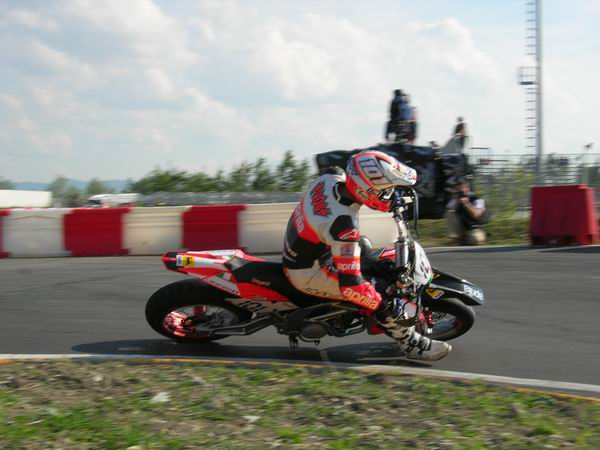
Thierry Van Den Bosch riding the SXV 450 in 2006

Aprilia debuted in the FIM Supermoto World Championship in 2004 and since then it has won many titles in both S1 and S2 classes.

==== Riders' championships ====
Year	Class	Champion	Motorcycle
2004	S2	(France) Jerome Giraudo	Aprilia SXV 450
2006	S2	(France) Thierry Van Den Bosch	Aprilia SXV 450
2011	S1	(France) Adrien Chareyre	Aprilia MXV-S 450

==== Manufacturers' championships ====
S1	S2
2008, 2011	2006, 2007

=== CIV ===
Aprilia has also participated in the CIV Championship having various titles since 1991.

Year	Class			
Year	125cc	250cc	Stock 1000	Superbike
1991		(Italy) Pierfrancesco Chili		
1992		(Italy) Marcellino Lucchi		
1993	(Italy) Stefano Perugini	(Italy) Marcellino Lucchi		
1994	(Italy) Ivan Cremonini	(Italy) Marcellino Lucchi		
1995	(Italy) Valentino Rossi	(Italy) Marcellino Lucchi		
1996		(Italy) Marcellino Lucchi		
1997		(Italy) Marcellino Lucchi		
1998		(Italy) Diego Giugovaz		
1999	(Italy) Fabrizio De Marco	(Italy) Ivan Clementi		
2000	(Italy) Gaspare Caffiero	(Italy) Riccardo Chiarello		
2005	(Italy) Simone Grotzkyj			
2006	(Italy) Luca Verdini			
2007	(Italy) Roberto Lacalendola			
2008	(Italy) Lorenzo Savadori			
2009	(Italy) Riccardo Moretti			
2010	(Italy) Francesco Mauriello		(Italy) Ivan Goi	
2011	(Italy) Niccolò Antonelli			
2012	(Italy) Lorenzo Dalla Porta			
2020				(Italy) Lorenzo Savadori

== Innovations ==
Aprilia is notable for choosing atypical engine configurations for their racing bikes.

For example, they progressed with development of a V-2 500 cc Grand Prix bike when other teams were moving to V-4 configurations for what some believed was better and more usable power outputs.

Aprilia continued this trend, taking advantage of lighter minimum weights with the introduction of their RS Cube MotoGP bike which features three cylinders in an inline triple layout, the bike had the fewest cylinders on the Grand Prix paddock.

It also pioneered many advanced technologies including ride by wire throttle and pneumatic valve actuation systems.

== Partnerships ==
=== As "Aprilia Racing Technology" ===
From 2012 to 2014 Aprilia supplied SBK-derived RSV4 bikes to Aspar Team, Paul Bird Motorsport and Speed Master.

=== As "Aprilia" ===
From 2015 to 2021, Aprilia partnered with Gresini Racing as a factory-supported independent team.

Since 2024, Trackhouse Racing has been Aprilia's satellite team.
