= 2026 Spanish motorcycle Grand Prix =

Motorcycle races in Jerez de la Frontera

(Spain) 2026 Spanish Grand Prix
Race details
- Race 4 of 22 races in the 2026 Grand Prix motorcycle racing season
- Date: 26 April 2026
- Official name: Estrella Galicia 0,0 Grand Prix of Spain
- Location: Circuito de Jerez – Ángel Nieto; Jerez de la Frontera, Cádiz, Spain
- Course: Permanent racing facility; 4.423 km (2.748 mi)

MotoGP
Pole position
Rider	(Spain) Marc Márquez	Ducati
Time	1:48.087	
Fastest lap
Rider	(Spain) Álex Márquez	Ducati
Time	1:37.081 on lap 2	
Podium
First	(Spain) Álex Márquez	Ducati
Second	(Italy) Marco Bezzecchi	Aprilia
Third	(Italy) Fabio Di Giannantonio	Ducati

Moto2
Pole position
Rider	(Netherlands) Collin Veijer	Kalex
Time	1:39.101	
Fastest lap
Rider	(Australia) Senna Agius	Kalex
Time	1:39.642 on lap 3	
Podium
First	(Australia) Senna Agius	Kalex
Second	(Spain) Manuel González	Kalex
Third	(Netherlands) Collin Veijer	Kalex

Moto3
Pole position
Rider	(Spain) Máximo Quiles	KTM
Time	1:44.070	
Fastest lap
Rider	(Spain) Adrián Fernández (Note: Fernández originally set the fastest lap in the race, recording a lap time of 1:44.554 on lap 4, but was disqualified from the first six races of the season for engine tampering. Máximo Quiles, who recorded the second fastest lap in the race, inherited the fastest lap statistic. However, Fernández's team Leopard Racing appealed the disqualification and won the appeal verdict, thus reinstating his results in the first six races.)	Honda
Time	1:44.554 on lap 4	
Podium
First	(Spain) Máximo Quiles	KTM
Second	(Spain) Adrián Fernández	Honda
Third	(Spain) David Muñoz	KTM

The 2026 Spanish motorcycle Grand Prix (officially known as the Estrella Galicia 0,0 Grand Prix of Spain) was the fourth round of the 2026 Grand Prix motorcycle racing season. All races were held at the Circuito de Jerez – Ángel Nieto in Jerez de la Frontera on 26 April 2026.

== Qualifying ==
=== MotoGP ===
Fastest session lap

Pos.	No.	Rider	Team	Constructor	Q1	Q2	Final grid	Row
1	93	(Spain) Marc Márquez	Ducati Lenovo Team	Ducati	Qualified to Q2	1:48.087	1	1
2	5	(France) Johann Zarco	Castrol Honda LCR	Honda	1:48.267	1:48.227	2	1
3	49	(Italy) Fabio Di Giannantonio	Pertamina Enduro VR46 Racing Team	Ducati	Qualified to Q2	1:49.097	3	1
4	72	(Italy) Marco Bezzecchi	Aprilia Racing	Aprilia	Qualified to Q2	1:49.115	4	2
5	73	(Spain) Álex Márquez	BK8 Gresini Racing MotoGP	Ducati	Qualified to Q2	1:49.146	5	2
6	37	(Spain) Pedro Acosta	Red Bull KTM Factory Racing	KTM	1:48.353	1:49.230	6	2
7	89	(Spain) Jorge Martín	Aprilia Racing	Aprilia	Qualified to Q2	1:49.509	10 (Note: 3-place grid penalty on Sunday race due to impeding.)	4
8	23	(Italy) Enea Bastianini	Red Bull KTM Tech3	KTM	Qualified to Q2	1:50.464	7	3
9	25	(Spain) Raúl Fernández	Trackhouse MotoGP Team	Aprilia	Qualified to Q2	1:50.524	8	3
10	63	(Italy) Francesco Bagnaia	Ducati Lenovo Team	Ducati	Qualified to Q2	1:51.027	9	3
11	79	(Japan) Ai Ogura	Trackhouse MotoGP Team	Aprilia	Qualified to Q2	1:51.110	11	4
12	54	(Spain) Fermín Aldeguer	BK8 Gresini Racing MotoGP	Ducati	Qualified to Q2	1:51.444	12	4
13	33	(South Africa) Brad Binder	Red Bull KTM Factory Racing	KTM	1:49.278	N/A	13	5
14	36	(Spain) Joan Mir	Honda HRC Castrol	Honda	1:49.522	N/A	14	5
15	10	(Italy) Luca Marini	Honda HRC Castrol	Honda	1:49.803	N/A	15	5
16	47	(Spain) Augusto Fernández	Yamaha Factory Racing	Yamaha	1:49.977	N/A	16	6
17	20	(France) Fabio Quartararo	Monster Energy Yamaha MotoGP Team	Yamaha	1:50.139	N/A	17	6
18	21	(Italy) Franco Morbidelli	Pertamina Enduro VR46 Racing Team	Ducati	1:50.219	N/A	18	6
19	7	(Turkey) Toprak Razgatlıoğlu	Prima Pramac Yamaha MotoGP	Yamaha	1:50.252	N/A	19	7
20	32	(Italy) Lorenzo Savadori	Aprilia Racing	Aprilia	1:50.390	N/A	20	7
21	42	(Spain) Álex Rins	Monster Energy Yamaha MotoGP Team	Yamaha	1:50.763	N/A	21	7
22	43	(Australia) Jack Miller	Prima Pramac Yamaha MotoGP	Yamaha	1:58.941	N/A	22	8
23	11	(Brazil) Diogo Moreira	Pro Honda LCR	Honda	No time set	N/A	23	8
Official MotoGP Qualifying 1 Report
Official MotoGP Qualifying 2 Report
Official MotoGP Grid Report

=== Moto2 ===
Fastest session lap

Pos.	No.	Rider	Team	Constructor	Q1	Q2	Final grid	Row
1	95	(Netherlands) Collin Veijer	Red Bull KTM Ajo	Kalex	Qualified to Q2	1:39.101	1	1
2	11	(Spain) Álex Escrig	Klint Racing Team	Forward	Qualified to Q2	1:39.158	2	1
3	18	(Spain) Manuel González	Liqui Moly Dynavolt Intact GP	Kalex	Qualified to Q2	1:39.196	3	1
4	81	(Australia) Senna Agius	Liqui Moly Dynavolt Intact GP	Kalex	Qualified to Q2	1:39.255	4	2
5	21	(Spain) Alonso López	Italjet Gresini Moto2	Kalex	Qualified to Q2	1:39.256	5	2
6	80	(Colombia) David Alonso	CFMoto Gaviota Aspar Team	Kalex	Qualified to Q2	1:39.368	6	2
7	96	(Spain) Daniel Holgado	CFMoto Gaviota Aspar Team	Kalex	Qualified to Q2	1:39.427	7	3
8	7	(Belgium) Barry Baltus	Reds Fantic Racing	Kalex	Qualified to Q2	1:39.433	8	3
9	28	(Spain) Izan Guevara	Blu Cru Pramac Yamaha Moto2	Boscoscuro	Qualified to Q2	1:39.629	12	4
10	17	(Spain) Daniel Muñoz	Italtrans Racing Team	Kalex	Qualified to Q2	1:39.640	9	3
11	44	(Spain) Arón Canet	Elf Marc VDS Racing Team	Boscoscuro	1:40.046	1:39.685	10	4
12	71	(Japan) Ayumu Sasaki	Momoven Idrofoglia RW Racing Team	Kalex	1:39.988	1:39.740	11	4
13	13	(Italy) Celestino Vietti	Beta Tools SpeedRS Team	Boscoscuro	Qualified to Q2	1:39.768	13	5
14	14	(Italy) Tony Arbolino	Reds Fantic Racing	Kalex	1:40.047	1:39.806	14	5
15	4	(Spain) Iván Ortolá	QJMotor – Galfer – MSi	Kalex	Qualified to Q2	1:39.866	15	5
16	99	(Spain) Adrián Huertas	Italtrans Racing Team	Kalex	1:40.030	1:40.135	16	6
17	64	(Indonesia) Mario Aji	Idemitsu Honda Team Asia	Kalex	Qualified to Q2	1:40.205	17	6
18	3	(Spain) Sergio García	Italjet Gresini Moto2	Kalex	Qualified to Q2	No time set	18	6
19	53	(Turkey) Deniz Öncü	Elf Marc VDS Racing Team	Boscoscuro	1:40.052	N/A	19	7
20	16	(United States) Joe Roberts	OnlyFans American Racing Team	Kalex	1:40.119	N/A	20	7
21	24	(Spain) Marcos Ramírez	QJMotor – Galfer – MSi	Kalex	1:40.233	N/A	21	7
22	84	(Netherlands) Zonta van den Goorbergh	Momoven Idrofoglia RW Racing Team	Kalex	1:40.284	N/A	22	8
23	12	(Czech Republic) Filip Salač	OnlyFans American Racing Team	Kalex	1:40.530	N/A	23	8
24	72	(Japan) Taiyo Furusato	Idemitsu Honda Team Asia	Kalex	1:40.654	N/A	24	8
25	98	(Spain) José Antonio Rueda	Red Bull KTM Ajo	Kalex	1:40.691	N/A	25	9
26	32	(Italy) Luca Lunetta	Beta Tools SpeedRS Team	Boscoscuro	1:40.844	N/A	26	9
27	9	(Spain) Jorge Navarro	Klint Racing Team	Forward	1:40.886	N/A	27	9
28	54	(Spain) Alberto Ferrández	Blu Cru Pramac Yamaha Moto2	Boscoscuro	1:40.913	N/A	28 (Note: Pit lane start penalty on Sunday race for irresponsible riding. Final grid position not affected)	10
Official Moto2 Qualifying 1 Report
Official Moto2 Qualifying 2 Report
Official Moto2 Grid Report

=== Moto3 ===
Fastest session lap

Pos.	No.	Rider	Team	Constructor	Q1	Q2	Final grid	Row
1	28	(Spain) Máximo Quiles	CFMoto Gaviota Aspar Team	KTM	Qualified to Q2	1:44.070	1	1
2	64	(Spain) David Muñoz	Liqui Moly Dynavolt Intact GP	KTM	Qualified to Q2	1:44.445	2	1
3	83	(Spain) Álvaro Carpe	Red Bull KTM Ajo	KTM	Qualified to Q2	1:44.655	3	1
4	78	(Spain) Joel Esteban	LevelUp – MTA	KTM	Qualified to Q2	1:44.836	4	2
5	51	(Spain) Brian Uriarte	Red Bull KTM Ajo	KTM	Qualified to Q2	1:45.049	5	2
6	31	(Spain) Adrián Fernández	Leopard Racing	Honda	Qualified to Q2	1:45.049	6	2
7	66	(Australia) Joel Kelso	Gryd – MLav Racing	Honda	1:46.129	1:45.067	7	3
8	22	(Spain) David Almansa	David Almansa	KTM	Qualified to Q2	1:45.099	8	3
9	18	(Italy) Matteo Bertelle	LevelUp – MTA	KTM	Qualified to Q2	1:45.152	9	3
10	13	(Malaysia) Hakim Danish	Aeon Credit – MT Helmets – MSi	KTM	1:46.358	1:45.273	10	4
11	97	(Argentina) Marco Morelli	CFMoto Gaviota Aspar Team	KTM	Qualified to Q2	1:45.310	11	4
12	73	(Argentina) Valentín Perrone	Red Bull KTM Tech3	KTM	Qualified to Q2	1:45.323	12	4
13	19	(United Kingdom) Scott Ogden	CIP Green Power	KTM	Qualified to Q2	1:45.360	13	5
14	21	(South Africa) Ruché Moodley	Code Motorsports	KTM	1:45.913	1:45.478	14	5
15	11	(Spain) Adrián Cruces	CIP Green Power	KTM	Qualified to Q2	1:45.611	15	5
16	67	(Republic of Ireland) Casey O'Gorman	Sic58 Squadra Corse	Honda	Qualified to Q2	1:45.623	16	6
17	9	(Indonesia) Veda Pratama	Honda Team Asia	Honda	1:46.103	1:45.738	17	6
18	27	(Finland) Rico Salmela	Red Bull KTM Tech3	KTM	Qualified to Q2	1:45.767	18	6
19	54	(Spain) Jesús Ríos	Rivacold Snipers Team	Honda	1:46.393	N/A	19	7
20	14	(New Zealand) Cormac Buchanan	Code Motorsports	KTM	1:46.428	N/A	20	7
21	94	(Italy) Guido Pini	Leopard Racing	Honda	1:46.590	N/A	21	7
22	6	(Japan) Ryusei Yamanaka	Aeon Credit – MT Helmets – MSi	KTM	1:46.786	N/A	22	8
23	32	(Japan) Zen Mitani	Honda Team Asia	Honda	1:46.818	N/A	23	8
24	8	(United Kingdom) Eddie O'Shea	Gryd – MLav Racing	Honda	1:46.906	N/A	24	8
25	10	(Italy) Nicola Carraro	Rivacold Snipers Team	Honda	1:47.316	N/A	25	9
26	5	(Austria) Leo Rammerstorfer	Sic58 Squadra Corse	Honda	1:47.816	N/A	26	9
Official Moto3 Qualifying 1 Report
Official Moto3 Qualifying 2 Report
Official Moto3 Grid Report

== MotoGP Sprint ==
The MotoGP Sprint was held on 25 April 2026.

Pos.	No.	Rider	Team	Manufacturer	Laps	Time/Retired	Grid	Points
1	93	(Spain) Marc Márquez	Ducati Lenovo Team	Ducati	12	21:25.651	1	12
2	63	(Italy) Francesco Bagnaia	Ducati Lenovo Team	Ducati	12	21:28.701	10	9
3	21	(Italy) Franco Morbidelli	Pertamina Enduro VR46 Racing Team	Ducati	12	21:33.144	18	7
4	33	(South Africa) Brad Binder	Red Bull KTM Factory Racing	KTM	12	21:34.403	13	6
5	49	(Italy) Fabio Di Giannantonio	Pertamina Enduro VR46 Racing Team	Ducati	12	21:34.888	3	5
6	25	(Spain) Raúl Fernández	Trackhouse MotoGP Team	Aprilia	12	21:37.609	9	4
7	20	(France) Fabio Quartararo	Monster Energy Yamaha MotoGP Team	Yamaha	12	21:39.176	17	3
8	5	(France) Johann Zarco	Castrol Honda LCR	Honda	12	21:40.173	2	2
9	10	(Italy) Luca Marini	Honda HRC Castrol	Honda	12	21:41.420	15	1
10	42	(Spain) Álex Rins	Monster Energy Yamaha MotoGP Team	Yamaha	12	21:41.472	21	
11	23	(Italy) Enea Bastianini	Red Bull KTM Tech3	KTM	12	21:41.841	8	
12	37	(Spain) Pedro Acosta	Red Bull KTM Factory Racing	KTM	12	21:43.636	6	
13	47	(Spain) Augusto Fernández	Yamaha Factory Racing	Yamaha	12	21:45.428	16	
14	11	(Brazil) Diogo Moreira	Pro Honda LCR	Honda	12	21:47.234	23	
15	79	(Japan) Ai Ogura	Trackhouse MotoGP Team	Aprilia	12	21:56.730	11	
16	43	(Australia) Jack Miller	Prima Pramac Yamaha MotoGP	Yamaha	12	22:10.337	22	
17	54	(Spain) Fermín Aldeguer	BK8 Gresini Racing MotoGP	Ducati	12	22:24.407	12	
Ret	36	(Spain) Joan Mir	Honda HRC Castrol	Honda	9	Accident	14	
Ret	72	(Italy) Marco Bezzecchi	Aprilia Racing	Aprilia	9	Accident	4	
Ret	73	(Spain) Álex Márquez	BK8 Gresini Racing MotoGP	Ducati	8	Accident	5	
Ret	32	(Italy) Lorenzo Savadori	Aprilia Racing	Aprilia	7	Collision	20	
Ret	7	(Turkey) Toprak Razgatlıoğlu	Prima Pramac Yamaha MotoGP	Yamaha	7	Collision	19	
Ret	89	(Spain) Jorge Martín	Aprilia Racing	Aprilia	1	Technical	7	
Fastest sprint lap: (Spain) Álex Márquez (Ducati) – 1:37.156 (lap 2)
Official MotoGP Sprint Report

== Race ==
=== MotoGP ===
Pos.	No.	Rider	Team	Manufacturer	Laps	Time/Retired	Grid	Points
1	73	(Spain) Álex Márquez	BK8 Gresini Racing MotoGP	Ducati	25	40:48.861	5	25
2	72	(Italy) Marco Bezzecchi	Aprilia Racing	Aprilia	25	+1.903	4	20
3	49	(Italy) Fabio Di Giannantonio	Pertamina Enduro VR46 Racing Team	Ducati	25	+5.796	3	16
4	89	(Spain) Jorge Martín	Aprilia Racing	Aprilia	25	+9.229	10	13
5	79	(Japan) Ai Ogura	Trackhouse MotoGP Team	Aprilia	25	+9.891	11	11
6	25	(Spain) Raúl Fernández	Trackhouse MotoGP Team	Aprilia	25	+10.614	8	10
7	5	(France) Johann Zarco	Castrol Honda LCR	Honda	25	+13.039	2	9
8	23	(Italy) Enea Bastianini	Red Bull KTM Tech3	KTM	25	+14.411	7	8
9	54	(Spain) Fermín Aldeguer	BK8 Gresini Racing MotoGP	Ducati	25	+19.778	12	7
10	37	(Spain) Pedro Acosta	Red Bull KTM Factory Racing	KTM	25	+22.431	6	6
11	33	(South Africa) Brad Binder	Red Bull KTM Factory Racing	KTM	25	+22.799	13	5
12	21	(Italy) Franco Morbidelli	Pertamina Enduro VR46 Racing Team	Ducati	25	+24.867	18	4
13	10	(Italy) Luca Marini	Honda HRC Castrol	Honda	25	+26.871	15	3
14	20	(France) Fabio Quartararo	Monster Energy Yamaha MotoGP Team	Yamaha	25	+29.532	17	2
15	36	(Spain) Joan Mir	Honda HRC Castrol	Honda	25	+29.899	14	1
16	42	(Spain) Álex Rins	Monster Energy Yamaha MotoGP Team	Yamaha	25	+32.921	21	
17	11	(Brazil) Diogo Moreira	Pro Honda LCR	Honda	25	+36.656	23	
18	43	(Australia) Jack Miller	Prima Pramac Yamaha MotoGP	Yamaha	25	+37.577	22	
19	7	(Turkey) Toprak Razgatlıoğlu	Prima Pramac Yamaha MotoGP	Yamaha	25	+44.557	19	
20	47	(Spain) Augusto Fernández	Yamaha Factory Racing	Yamaha	25	+1:05.023	16	
Ret	63	(Italy) Francesco Bagnaia	Ducati Lenovo Team	Ducati	13	Technical	9	
Ret	32	(Italy) Lorenzo Savadori	Aprilia Racing	Aprilia	6	Retired	20	
Ret	93	(Spain) Marc Márquez	Ducati Lenovo Team	Ducati	1	Accident	1	
Fastest lap: (Spain) Álex Márquez (Ducati) – 1:37.081 (lap 2)
Official MotoGP Race Report

=== Moto2 ===
Pos.	No.	Rider	Team	Manufacturer	Laps	Time/Retired	Grid	Points
1	81	(Australia) Senna Agius	Liqui Moly Dynavolt Intact GP	Kalex	21	35:17.948	4	25
2	18	(Spain) Manuel González	Liqui Moly Dynavolt Intact GP	Kalex	21	+0.885	3	20
3	95	(Netherlands) Collin Veijer	Red Bull KTM Ajo	Kalex	21	+1.107	1	16
4	80	(Colombia) David Alonso	CFMoto Gaviota Aspar Team	Kalex	21	+2.032	6	13
5	13	(Italy) Celestino Vietti	Beta Tools SpeedRS Team	Boscoscuro	21	+4.212	13	11
6	17	(Spain) Daniel Muñoz	Italtrans Racing Team	Kalex	21	+10.013	9	10
7	28	(Spain) Izan Guevara	Blu Cru Pramac Yamaha Moto2	Boscoscuro	21	+10.660	12	9
8	14	(Italy) Tony Arbolino	Reds Fantic Racing	Kalex	21	+11.649	14	8
9	11	(Spain) Álex Escrig	Klint Racing Team	Forward	21	+12.289	2	7
10	4	(Spain) Iván Ortolá	QJMotor – Galfer – MSi	Kalex	21	+12.564	15	6
11	96	(Spain) Daniel Holgado	CFMoto Gaviota Aspar Team	Kalex	21	+12.934	7	5
12	71	(Japan) Ayumu Sasaki	Momoven Idrofoglia RW Racing Team	Kalex	21	+14.893	11	4
13	53	(Turkey) Deniz Öncü	Elf Marc VDS Racing Team	Boscoscuro	21	+15.386	19	3
14	12	(Czech Republic) Filip Salač	OnlyFans American Racing Team	Kalex	21	+15.539	23	2
15	16	(United States) Joe Roberts	OnlyFans American Racing Team	Kalex	21	+16.239	20	1
16	24	(Spain) Marcos Ramírez	QJMotor – Galfer – MSi	Kalex	21	+17.444	21	
17	84	(Netherlands) Zonta van den Goorbergh	Momoven Idrofoglia RW Racing Team	Kalex	21	+20.838	22	
18	32	(Italy) Luca Lunetta	Beta Tools SpeedRS Team	Boscoscuro	21	+27.305	26	
19	3	(Spain) Sergio García	Italjet Gresini Moto2	Kalex	21	+28.559	18	
20	98	(Spain) José Antonio Rueda	Red Bull KTM Ajo	Kalex	21	+29.672	25	
21	54	(Spain) Alberto Ferrández	Blu Cru Pramac Yamaha Moto2	Boscoscuro	21	+36.244	28	
Ret	64	(Indonesia) Mario Aji	Idemitsu Honda Team Asia	Kalex	17	Accident	17	
Ret	9	(Spain) Jorge Navarro	Klint Racing Team	Forward	10	Accident	27	
Ret	72	(Japan) Taiyo Furusato	Idemitsu Honda Team Asia	Kalex	8	Accident	24	
Ret	7	(Belgium) Barry Baltus	Reds Fantic Racing	Kalex	6	Accident	8	
Ret	21	(Spain) Alonso López	Italjet Gresini Moto2	Kalex	6	Accident	5	
Ret	44	(Spain) Arón Canet	Elf Marc VDS Racing Team	Boscoscuro	5	Accident	10	
Ret	99	(Spain) Adrián Huertas	Italtrans Racing Team	Kalex	0	Technical	16	
Fastest lap: (Australia) Senna Agius (Kalex) – 1:39.642 (lap 3)
Official Moto2 Race Report

=== Moto3 ===
Pos.	No.	Rider	Team	Manufacturer	Laps	Time/Retired	Grid	Points
1	28	(Spain) Máximo Quiles	CFMoto Gaviota Aspar Team	KTM	19	33:23.556	1	25
2	31	(Spain) Adrián Fernández (Note: Originally finished second and recorded the fastest lap of the race but was disqualified from the first six races of the season for engine tampering. However, his team Leopard Racing appealed the disqualification and won the appeal verdict, thus reinstating his results in the first six races.)	Leopard Racing	Honda	19	+1.991	6	20
3	64	(Spain) David Muñoz	Liqui Moly Dynavolt Intact GP	KTM	19	+2.009	2	16
4	97	(Argentina) Marco Morelli	CFMoto Gaviota Aspar Team	KTM	19	+2.049	11	13
5	83	(Spain) Álvaro Carpe	Red Bull KTM Ajo	KTM	19	+9.926	3	11
6	9	(Indonesia) Veda Pratama	Honda Team Asia	Honda	19	+10.027	17	10
7	73	(Argentina) Valentín Perrone	Red Bull KTM Tech3	KTM	19	+11.526	12	9
8	22	(Spain) David Almansa	Liqui Moly Dynavolt Intact GP	KTM	19	+11.601	8	8
9	54	(Spain) Jesús Ríos	Rivacold Snipers Team	Honda	19	+11.482 (Note: 2-place penalty for causing a contact.)	19	7
10	78	(Spain) Joel Esteban	LevelUp – MTA	KTM	19	+11.647	4	6
11	51	(Spain) Brian Uriarte	Red Bull KTM Ajo	KTM	19	+11.758	5	5
12	67	(Republic of Ireland) Casey O'Gorman	Sic58 Squadra Corse	Honda	19	+12.537	16	4
13	13	(Malaysia) Hakim Danish	Aeon Credit – MT Helmets – MSi	KTM	19	+12.584	10	3
14	66	(Australia) Joel Kelso	Gryd – MLav Racing	Honda	19	+13.091	7	2
15	27	(Finland) Rico Salmela	Red Bull KTM Tech3	KTM	19	+21.818	18	1
16	19	(United Kingdom) Scott Ogden	CIP Green Power	KTM	19	+25.870	13	
17	6	(Japan) Ryusei Yamanaka	Aeon Credit – MT Helmets – MSi	KTM	19	+29.334	22	
18	8	(United Kingdom) Eddie O'Shea	Gryd – MLav Racing	Honda	19	+29.713	24	
19	14	(New Zealand) Cormac Buchanan	Code Motorsports	KTM	19	+30.066	20	
20	11	(Spain) Adrián Cruces	CIP Green Power	KTM	19	+30.068	15	
21	32	(Japan) Zen Mitani	Honda Team Asia	Honda	19	+30.104	23	
22	21	(South Africa) Ruché Moodley	Aeon Credit – MT Helmets – MSi	KTM	19	+30.180	14	
Ret	18	(Italy) Matteo Bertelle	LevelUp – MTA	KTM	11	Accident damage	9	
Ret	10	(Italy) Nicola Carraro	Rivacold Snipers Team	Honda	8	Accident	25	
Ret	94	(Italy) Guido Pini	Leopard Racing	Honda	7	Accident	21	
DNS	5	(Austria) Leo Rammerstorfer	Sic58 Squadra Corse	Honda	0	Technical	26	
Fastest lap: (Spain) Adrián Fernández (Honda) – 1:44.554 (lap 4)
Official Moto3 Race Report

== Championship standings after the race ==
Below are the standings for the top five riders, constructors, and teams after the round.

=== MotoGP ===
Riders' Championship standings

	Pos.	Rider	Points
	1	(Italy) Marco Bezzecchi	101
	2	(Spain) Jorge Martín	90
1	3	(Italy) Fabio Di Giannantonio	71
1	4	(Spain) Pedro Acosta	66
	5	(Spain) Marc Márquez	57

Constructors' Championship standings

Pos.	Constructor	Points
1	(Italy) Aprilia	125
2	(Italy) Ducati	106
3	(Austria) KTM	79
4	(Japan) Honda	39
5	(Japan) Yamaha	14

Teams' Championship standings

	Pos.	Team	Points
	1	(Italy) Aprilia Racing	191
1	2	(United States) Trackhouse MotoGP Team	102
2	3	(Italy) Pertamina Enduro VR46 Racing Team	96
2	4	(Austria) Red Bull KTM Factory Racing	94
1	5	(Italy) Ducati Lenovo Team	91

=== Moto2 ===
Riders' Championship standings

	Pos.	Rider	Points
	1	(Spain) Manuel González	59.5
4	2	(Australia) Senna Agius	50
1	3	(Spain) Izan Guevara	45
	4	(Italy) Celestino Vietti	43
2	5	(Spain) Daniel Holgado	38

Constructors' Championship standings

Pos.	Constructor	Points
1	(Germany) Kalex	87.5
2	(Italy) Boscoscuro	51
3	(Switzerland) Forward	30

Teams' Championship standings

Pos.	Team	Points
1	(Germany) Liqui Moly Dynavolt Intact GP	109.5
2	(Spain) CFMoto Gaviota Aspar Team	75
3	(Italy) Blu Cru Pramac Yamaha Moto2	45.5
4	(Italy) Italtrans Racing Team	44
5	(Italy) Beta Tools SpeedRS Team	43

=== Moto3 ===
Riders' Championship standings

	Pos.	Rider	Points
	1	(Spain) Máximo Quiles	90
	2	(Spain) Álvaro Carpe	53
3	3	(Spain) Adrián Fernández	49
1	4	(Argentina) Valentín Perrone	47
	5	(Argentina) Marco Morelli	45

Constructors' Championship standings

Pos.	Constructor	Points
1	(Austria) KTM	95
2	(Japan) Honda	72

Teams' Championship standings

Pos.	Team	Points
1	(Spain) CFMoto Gaviota Aspar Team	135
2	(Luxembourg) Leopard Racing	85
3	(Finland) Red Bull KTM Ajo	81
4	(France) Red Bull KTM Tech3	68
5	(Germany) Liqui Moly Dynavolt Intact GP	57

== Notes ==
Previous race: 2026 United States Grand Prix	FIM Grand Prix World Championship; 2026 season	Next race: 2026 French Grand Prix
Previous race: 2025 Spanish Grand Prix	Spanish motorcycle Grand Prix	Next race: 2027 Spanish Grand Prix
