= 2025 German motorcycle Grand Prix =

Motorcycle races in Hohenstein-Ernstthal

(Germany) 2025 German Grand Prix
Race details
- Race 11 of 22 races in the 2025 Grand Prix motorcycle racing season
- Date: 13 July 2025
- Official name: Liqui Moly Grand Prix of Germany
- Location: Sachsenring; Hohenstein-Ernstthal, Germany
- Course: Permanent racing facility; 3.671 km (2.281 mi)

MotoGP
Pole position
Rider	(Spain) Marc Márquez	Ducati
Time	1:27.811	
Fastest lap
Rider	(Spain) Marc Márquez	Ducati
Time	1:20.704 on lap 5	
Podium
First	(Spain) Marc Márquez	Ducati
Second	(Spain) Álex Márquez	Ducati
Third	(Italy) Francesco Bagnaia	Ducati

Moto2
Pole position
Rider	(United Kingdom) Jake Dixon	Boscoscuro
Time	1:33.487	
Fastest lap
Rider	(Brazil) Diogo Moreira	Kalex
Time	1:23.270 on lap 3	
Podium
First	(Turkey) Deniz Öncü	Kalex
Second	(Belgium) Barry Baltus	Kalex
Third	(United Kingdom) Jake Dixon	Boscoscuro

Moto3
Pole position
Rider	(United Kingdom) Scott Ogden	KTM
Time	1:35.001	
Fastest lap
Rider	(Spain) Ángel Piqueras	KTM
Time	1:26.547 on lap 21	
Podium
First	(Spain) David Muñoz	KTM
Second	(Spain) Máximo Quiles	KTM
Third	(Spain) José Antonio Rueda	KTM

The 2025 German motorcycle Grand Prix (officially known as the Liqui Moly Grand Prix of Germany) was the eleventh round of the 2025 Grand Prix motorcycle racing season. All races were held at the Sachsenring in Hohenstein-Ernstthal on 13 July 2025.

After being diagnosed with appendicitis on Thursday, Red Bull KTM Tech3 have confirmed that Enea Bastianini wil not participate in Saturday and Sunday’s action.

Somkiat Chantra, the IDEMITSU Honda LCR rider was training at home when, following a fall, he fractured the lateral collateral ligament in his right knee. His team have confirmed that the rider has undergone successful surgery on his right knee. Chantra will be forced to miss the German and upcoming Czech Grand Prix.

Both MotoGP riders will not be replaced in the German Grand Prix.

In Moto2 Taiga Hada replaced the injured Mario Aji for Idemitsu Honda Team Asia.

In Moto3 the injured Ruche Moodley was replaced by Leonardo Abruzzo for DENSSI Racing - BOE. Luca Lunetta suffered a fractured tibia and fibula during a crash at the Dutch Moto3 GP, leading to his replacement by Lennox Phommara for subsequent races.

== Practice session ==
=== MotoGP ===
==== Combined Free Practice 1-2 ====
Fastest session lap

Pos.	No.	Biker	Team	Constructor	Practice times	
Pos.	No.	Biker	Team	Constructor	P1	P2
1	93	(Spain) Marc Márquez	Ducati Lenovo Team	Ducati	**1:20.372**	**1:28.277**
2	43	(Australia) Jack Miller	Prima Pramac Yamaha MotoGP	Yamaha	1:20.481	1:29.089
3	72	(Italy) Marco Bezzecchi	Aprilia Racing	Aprilia	1:20.687	1:29.455
4	5	(France) Johann Zarco	Castrol Honda LCR	Honda	1:20.880	1:29.264
5	12	(Spain) Maverick Viñales	Red Bull KTM Tech3	KTM	1:20.947	1:28.474
6	49	(Italy) Fabio Di Giannantonio	Pertamina Enduro VR46 Racing Team	Ducati	1:20.982	1:29.729
7	36	(Spain) Joan Mir	Honda HRC Castrol	Honda	1:21.014	1:30.009
8	20	(France) Fabio Quartararo	Monster Energy Yamaha MotoGP Team	Yamaha	1:21.016	1:29.966
9	63	(Italy) Francesco Bagnaia	Ducati Lenovo Team	Ducati	1:21.072	1:29.750
10	88	(Portugal) Miguel Oliveira	Prima Pramac Yamaha MotoGP	Yamaha	1:21.090	1:30.190
11	33	(South Africa) Brad Binder	Red Bull KTM Factory Racing	KTM	1:21.219	1:29.216
12	54	(Spain) Fermín Aldeguer	BK8 Gresini Racing MotoGP	Ducati	1:21.244	1:29.591
13	37	(Spain) Pedro Acosta	Red Bull KTM Factory Racing	KTM	1:21.253	1:28.680
14	73	(Spain) Álex Márquez	BK8 Gresini Racing MotoGP	Ducati	1:21.276	1:29.173
15	25	(Spain) Raúl Fernández	Trackhouse MotoGP Team	Aprilia	1:21.364	1:30.538
16	21	(Italy) Franco Morbidelli	Pertamina Enduro VR46 Racing Team	Ducati	1:21.373	1:29.197
17	10	(Italy) Luca Marini	Honda HRC Castrol	Honda	1:21.411	1:29.548
18	42	(Spain) Álex Rins	Monster Energy Yamaha MotoGP Team	Yamaha	1:21.478	1:30.301
19	79	(Japan) Ai Ogura	Trackhouse MotoGP Team	Aprilia	1:21.894	1:31.702
20	32	(Spain) Lorenzo Savadori	Aprilia Racing	Aprilia	1:22.739	1:30.929
OFFICIAL MOTOGP COMBINED PRACTICE TIMES REPORT

==== Practice ====
The top ten riders (written in bold) qualified for Q2.

Fastest session lap

Pos.	No.	Biker	Team	Constructor	
Pos.	No.	Biker	Team	Constructor	Time results
1	**49**	**(Italy) Fabio Di Giannantonio**	**Pertamina Enduro VR46 Racing Team**	**Ducati**	**1:19.071**
2	**73**	**(Spain) Álex Márquez**	**BK8 Gresini Racing MotoGP**	**Ducati**	**1:19.408**
3	**93**	**(Spain) Marc Márquez**	**Ducati Lenovo Team**	**Ducati**	**1:19.461**
4	**20**	**(France) Fabio Quartararo**	**Monster Energy Yamaha MotoGP Team**	**Yamaha**	**1:19.524**
5	**37**	**(Spain) Pedro Acosta**	**Red Bull KTM Factory Racing**	**KTM**	**1:19.560**
6	**21**	**(Italy) Franco Morbidelli**	**Pertamina Enduro VR46 Racing Team**	**Ducati**	**1:19.592**
7	**72**	**(Italy) Marco Bezzecchi**	**Aprilia Racing**	**Aprilia**	**1:19.595**
8	**43**	**(Australia) Jack Miller**	**Prima Pramac Yamaha MotoGP**	**Yamaha**	**1:31.992**
9	**63**	**(Italy) Francesco Bagnaia**	**Ducati Lenovo Team**	**Ducati**	**1:19.698**
10	**33**	**(South Africa) Brad Binder**	**Red Bull KTM Factory Racing**	**KTM**	**1:19.733**
11	12	(Spain) Maverick Viñales	Red Bull KTM Tech3	KTM	1:19.780
12	5	(France) Johann Zarco	CASTROL Honda LCR	Honda	1:19.964
13	79	(Japan) Ai Ogura	Trackhouse MotoGP Team	Aprilia	1:20.004
14	25	(Spain) Raúl Fernández	Trackhouse MotoGP Team	Aprilia	1:20.005
15	36	(Spain) Joan Mir	Honda HRC Castrol	Honda	1:20.099
16	54	(Spain) Fermín Aldeguer	BK8 Gresini Racing MotoGP	Ducati	1:20.191
17	88	(Portugal) Miguel Oliveira	Prima Pramac Yamaha MotoGP	Yamaha	1:20.202
18	10	(Italy) Luca Marini	Honda HRC Castrol	Honda	1:20.309
19	42	(Spain) Álex Rins	Monster Energy Yamaha MotoGP Team	Yamaha	1:20.668
20	32	(Italy) Lorenzo Savadori	Aprilia Racing	Aprilia	1:20.722
OFFICIAL MOTOGP PRACTICE TIMES REPORT

=== Moto2 ===
==== Combined Practice 1-2 ====
Fastest session lap

Pos.	No.	Biker	Team	Constructor	Practice times	
Pos.	No.	Biker	Team	Constructor	P1	P2
1	16	(United States) Joe Roberts	OnlyFans American Racing Team	Kalex	**1:23.072**	1:33.834
2	96	(United Kingdom) Jake Dixon	Elf Marc VDS Racing Team	Boscoscuro	1:23.087	1:33.476
3	18	(Spain) Manuel González	Liqui Moly Dynavolt Intact GP	Kalex	1:23.139	1:33.160
4	12	(Czech Republic) Filip Salač	Elf Marc VDS Racing Team	Boscoscuro	1:23.175	1:34.928
5	24	(Spain) Marcos Ramírez	OnlyFans American Racing Team	Kalex	1:23.219	1:33.676
6	28	(Spain) Izan Guevara	Blu Cru Pramac Yamaha Moto2	Boscoscuro	1:23.225	1:33.542
7	80	(Colombia) David Alonso	CFMoto Inde Aspar Team	Kalex	1:23.233	1:32.717
8	53	(Turkey) Deniz Öncü	Red Bull KTM Ajo	Kalex	1:23.302	1:32.653
9	71	(Japan) Ayumu Sasaki	RW-Idrofoglia Racing GP	Kalex	1:23.325	1:34.599
10	13	(Italy) Celestino Vietti	Folladore SpeedRS Team	Boscoscuro	1:23.381	1:34.563
11	44	(Spain) Arón Canet	Fantic Racing Lino Sonego	Kalex	1:23.398	1:32.829
12	21	(Spain) Alonso López	Folladore SpeedRS Team	Boscoscuro	1:23.414	1:33.881
13	81	(Australia) Senna Agius	Liqui Moly Dynavolt Intact GP	Kalex	1:23.427	1:33.795
14	7	(Belgium) Barry Baltus	Fantic Racing Lino Sonego	Kalex	1:23.462	1:32.837
15	75	(Spain) Albert Arenas	Italjet Gresini Moto2	Kalex	1:23.595	1:33.286
16	27	(Spain) Daniel Holgado	CFMoto Inde Aspar Team	Kalex	1:23.862	1:32.570
17	10	(Brazil) Diogo Moreira	Italtrans Racing Team	Kalex	1:23.882	1:32.739
18	4	(Spain) Iván Ortolá	QJMotor – Frinsa – MSi	Boscoscuro	1:23.935	1:32.966
19	92	(Japan) Yuki Kunii	Idemitsu Honda Team Asia	Kalex	1:23.944	1:34.627
20	99	(Spain) Adrián Huertas	Italtrans Racing Team	Kalex	1:23.963	1:33.469
21	95	(Netherlands) Collin Veijer	Red Bull KTM Ajo	Kalex	1:24.077	1:36.501
22	14	(Italy) Tony Arbolino	Blu Cru Pramac Yamaha Moto2	Boscoscuro	1:24.084	**1:31.613**
23	84	(Netherlands) Zonta van den Goorbergh	RW-Idrofoglia Racing GP	Kalex	1:24.194	1:34.844
24	9	(Spain) Jorge Navarro	Klint Forward Factory Team	Forward	1:24.294	1:33.977
25	11	(Spain) Alex Escrig	Klint Forward Factory Team	Forward	1:24.370	1:33.092
26	15	(South Africa) Darryn Binder	Italjet Gresini Moto2	Kalex	1:24.531	1:34.656
27	23	(Japan) Taiga Hada	Idemitsu Honda Team Asia	Kalex	1:24.874	1:35.207
28	61	(Spain) Eric Fernández	QJMotor – Frinsa – MSi	Boscoscuro	1:26.136	1:33.362
OFFICIAL MOTO2 FREE PRACTICE TIMES REPORT

==== Practice ====
The top 14 riders (written in bold) qualified for Q2.

Pos.	No.	Biker	Team	Constructor	Time results
Pos.	No.	Biker	Team	Constructor	P1
1	13	(Italy) **Celestino Vietti**	**Folladore SpeedRS Team**	**Boscoscuro**	**1:22.329**
2	81	(Australia) **Senna Agius**	**Liqui Moly Dynavolt Intact GP**	**Kalex**	1:22.459
3	18	(Spain) **Manuel González**	**Liqui Moly Dynavolt Intact GP**	**Kalex**	1:22.606
4	24	(Spain) **Marcos Ramírez**	**OnlyFans American Racing Team**	**Kalex**	1:22.749
5	44	(Spain) **Arón Canet**	**Fantic Racing Lino Sonego**	**Kalex**	1:22.765
6	71	(Japan) **Ayumu Sasaki**	**RW-Idrofoglia Racing GP**	**Kalex**	1:36.145
7	12	(Czech Republic) **Filip Salač**	**Elf Marc VDS Racing Team**	**Boscoscuro**	1:22.823
8	16	(United States) **Joe Roberts**	**OnlyFans American Racing Team**	**Kalex**	1:22.838
9	80	(Colombia) **David Alonso**	**CFMoto Inde Aspar Team**	**Kalex**	1:22.844
10	27	(Spain) **Daniel Holgado**	**CFMoto Inde Aspar Team**	**Kalex**	1:22.845
11	53	(Turkey) **Deniz Öncü**	**Red Bull KTM Ajo**	**Kalex**	1:22.854
12	14	(Italy) **Tony Arbolino**	**Blu Cru Pramac Yamaha Moto2**	**Boscoscuro**	1:22.861
13	4	(Spain) **Iván Ortolá**	**QJMotor – Frinsa – MSi**	**Boscoscuro**	1:22.865
14	21	(Spain) **Alonso López**	**Folladore SpeedRS Team**	**Boscoscuro**	1:22.925
15	92	(Japan) Yuki Kunii	Idemitsu Honda Team Asia	Kalex	1:22.975
16	10	(Brazil) Diogo Moreira	Italtrans Racing Team	Kalex	1:22.980
17	96	(United Kingdom) Jake Dixon	Elf Marc VDS Racing Team	Boscoscuro	1:23.017
18	7	(Belgium) Barry Baltus	Fantic Racing Lino Sonego	Kalex	1:23.024
19	84	(Netherlands) Zonta van den Goorbergh	RW-Idrofoglia Racing GP	Kalex	1:23.037
20	75	(Spain) Albert Arenas	Italjet Gresini Moto2	Kalex	1:23.052
21	28	(Spain) Izan Guevara	Blu Cru Pramac Yamaha Moto2	Boscoscuro	1:23.083
22	95	(Netherlands) Collin Veijer	Red Bull KTM Ajo	Kalex	1:23.229
23	99	(Spain) Adrián Huertas	Italtrans Racing Team	Kalex	1:23.344
24	9	(Spain) Jorge Navarro	Klint Forward Factory Team	Forward	1:23.641
25	15	(South Africa) Darryn Binder	Italjet Gresini Moto2	Kalex	1:23.968
26	11	(Spain) Alex Escrig	Klint Forward Factory Team	Forward	1:24.013
27	23	(Japan) Taiga Hada	Idemitsu Honda Team Asia	Kalex	1:24.715
28	61	(Spain) Eric Fernández	QJMotor – Frinsa – MSi	Boscoscuro	1:25.311
OFFICIAL MOTO2 PRACTICE TIMES REPORT

=== Moto3 ===
==== Combined Practice 1-2 ====
Fastest session lap

Pos.	No.	Biker	Team	Constructor	Practice times	
Pos.	No.	Biker	Team	Constructor	P1	P2
1	19	(United Kingdom) Scott Ogden	CIP Green Power	KTM	**1:25.707**	1:35.208
2	99	(Spain) José Antonio Rueda	Red Bull KTM Ajo	KTM	1:25.834	1:35.179
3	66	(Australia) Joel Kelso	LEVELUP-MTA	KTM	1:25.873	1:35.408
4	72	(Japan) Taiyo Furusato	Honda Team Asia	Honda	1:26.003	1:36.074
5	31	(Spain) Adrián Fernández	Leopard Racing	Honda	1:26.013	**1:34.623**
6	22	(Spain) David Almansa	Leopard Racing	Honda	1:26.084	1:35.024
7	36	(Spain) Ángel Piqueras	Frinsa – MT Helmets – MSI	KTM	1:26.178	1:34.696
8	82	(Italy) Stefano Nepa	Sic58 Squadra Corse	Honda	1:26.205	1:36.255
9	14	(New Zealand) Cormac Buchanan	Denssi Racing – BOE	KTM	1:26.322	1:35.082
10	71	(Italy) Dennis Foggia	CFMoto Gaviota Aspar Team	KTM	1:26.330	1:38.381
11	8	(United Kingdom) Eddie O'Shea	GRYD - Mlav Racing	Honda	1:26.345	1:36.444
12	6	(Japan) Ryusei Yamanaka	Frinsa – MT Helmets – MSI	KTM	1:26.430	1:35.309
13	83	(Spain) Álvaro Carpe	Red Bull KTM Ajo	KTM	1:26.507	1:35.032
14	64	(Spain) David Muñoz	Liqui Moly Dynavolt Intact GP	KTM	1:26.614	1:35.732
15	94	(Italy) Guido Pini	Liqui Moly Dynavolt Intact GP	KTM	1:26.946	1:35.446
16	55	(Switzerland) Noah Dettwiler	CIP Green Power	KTM	1:26.981	1:34.972
17	12	(Australia) Jacob Roulstone	Red Bull KTM Tech3	KTM	1:26.989	1:36.771
18	73	(Argentina) Valentín Perrone	Red Bull KTM Tech3	KTM	1:27.424	1:36.546
19	10	(Italy) Nicola Carraro	Rivacold Snipers Team	Honda	1:27.566	1:36.258
20	28	(Spain) Máximo Quiles	CFMoto Gaviota Aspar Team	KTM	1:27.598	1:35.120
21	54	(Italy) Riccardo Rossi	Rivacold Snipers Team	Honda	1:27.633	1:38.118
22	89	(Spain) Marcos Uriarte	LEVELUP-MTA	KTM	1:27.680	1:35.595
23	32	(Spain) Vicente Pérez	GRYD - Mlav Racing	Honda	1:28.439	1:37.841
24	48	(Switzerland) Lenoxx Phommara	Sic58 Squadra Corse	Honda	1:29.715	1:36.170
25	5	(Thailand) Tatchakorn Buasri	Honda Team Asia	Honda	N/A	1:36.769
26	25	(Italy) Leonardo Abruzzo	DENSSI Racing - BOE	KTM	N/A	1:36.839
OFFICIAL MOTO3 FREE PRACTICE TIMES REPORT

==== Practice ====
The top 14 riders (written in bold) qualified for Q2.

Pos.	No.	Biker	Team	Constructor	Practice times
Pos.	No.	Biker	Team	Constructor	P1
1	64	(Spain) **David Muñoz**	**Liqui Moly Dynavolt Intact GP**	**KTM**	1:24.767
2	22	(Spain) **David Almansa**	**Leopard Racing**	**Honda**	1:25.127
3	19	(United Kingdom) **Scott Ogden**	**CIP Green Power**	**KTM**	1:25.172
4	28	(Spain) **Máximo Quiles**	**CFMoto Gaviota Aspar Team**	**KTM**	1:25.220
5	12	(Australia) **Jacob Roulstone**	**Red Bull KTM Tech3**	**KTM**	1:25.264
6	72	(Japan) **Taiyo Furusato**	**Honda Team Asia**	**Honda**	1:25.315
7	83	(Spain) **Álvaro Carpe**	**Red Bull KTM Ajo**	**KTM**	1:25.454
8	66	(Australia) **Joel Kelso**	**LEVELUP-MTA**	**KTM**	1:25.480
9	6	(Japan) **Ryusei Yamanaka**	**Frinsa – MT Helmets – MSI**	**KTM**	1:25.551
10	99	(Spain) **José Antonio Rueda**	**Red Bull KTM Ajo**	**KTM**	1:25.566
11	31	(Spain) **Adrián Fernández**	**Leopard Racing**	**Honda**	1:25.572
12	36	(Spain) **Ángel Piqueras**	**Frinsa – MT Helmets – MSI**	**KTM**	1:25.605
13	89	(Spain) **Marcos Uriarte**	**LEVELUP-MTA**	**KTM**	1:25.748
14	94	(Italy) **Guido Pini**	**Liqui Moly Dynavolt Intact GP**	**KTM**	1:25.773
15	10	(Italy) Nicola Carraro	Rivacold Snipers Team	Honda	1:25.785
16	71	(Italy) Dennis Foggia	CFMoto Gaviota Aspar Team	KTM	1:25.905
17	8	(United Kingdom) Eddie O'Shea	GRYD - Mlav Racing	Honda	1:26.094
18	82	(Italy) Stefano Nepa	Sic58 Squadra Corse	Honda	1:26.116
19	14	(New Zealand) Cormac Buchanan	Denssi Racing – BOE	KTM	1:26.208
20	73	(Argentina) Valentín Perrone	Red Bull KTM Tech3	KTM	1:26.252
21	54	(Italy) Riccardo Rossi	Rivacold Snipers Team	Honda	1:26.315
22	5	(Thailand) Tatchakorn Buasri	Honda Team Asia	Honda	1:26.409
23	55	(Switzerland) Noah Dettwiler	CIP Green Power	KTM	1:26.443
24	32	(Spain) Vicente Pérez	GRYD - Mlav Racing	Honda	1:27.031
25	25	(Italy) Leonardo Abruzzo	DENSSI Racing - BOE	KTM	1:27.893
26	48	(Switzerland) Lenoxx Phommara	Sic58 Squadra Corse	Honda	1:28.347
OFFICIAL MOTO3 PRACTICE TIMES REPORT

== Qualifying ==
=== MotoGP ===
Fastest session lap

Pos.	No.	Biker	Team	Constructor	Qualifying times		Final grid	Row
Pos.	No.	Biker	Team	Constructor	Q1	Q2	Final grid	Row
1	93	(Spain) Marc Márquez	Ducati Lenovo Team	Ducati	Qualified in Q2	1:27.811	1	1
2	5	(France) Johann Zarco	Castrol Honda LCR	Honda	1:27.827	1:27.962	2	1
3	72	(Italy) Marco Bezzecchi	Aprilia Racing	Aprilia	Qualified in Q2	1:28.232	3	1
4	21	(Italy) Franco Morbidelli	Pertamina Enduro VR46 Racing Team	Ducati	Qualified in Q2	1:28.650	4	2
5	37	(Spain) Pedro Acosta	Red Bull KTM Factory Racing	KTM	Qualified in Q2	1:28.779	5	2
6	73	(Spain) Álex Márquez	BK8 Gresini Racing MotoGP	Ducati	Qualified in Q2	1:29.242	6	2
7	20	(France) Fabio Quartararo	Monster Energy Yamaha MotoGP Team	Yamaha	Qualified in Q2	1:29.250	7	3
8	49	(Italy) Fabio Di Giannantonio	Pertamina Enduro VR46 Racing Team	Ducati	Qualified in Q2	1:29.327	8	3
9	43	(Australia) Jack Miller	Prima Pramac Yamaha MotoGP	Yamaha	Qualified in Q2	1:29.471	9	3
10	33	(South Africa) Brad Binder	Red Bull KTM Factory Racing	KTM	Qualified in Q2	1:29.505	10	4
11	63	(Italy) Francesco Bagnaia	Ducati Lenovo Team	Ducati	Qualified in Q2	1:29.753	11	4
12	12	(Spain) Maverick Viñales	Red Bull KTM Tech3	KTM	1:28.049	N/A	N/A	4
13	88	(Portugal) Miguel Oliveira	Prima Pramac Yamaha MotoGP	Yamaha	1:28.294	N/A	12	4
14	54	(Spain) Fermín Aldeguer	BK8 Gresini Racing MotoGP	Ducati	1:28.355	N/A	13	5
15	10	(Italy) Luca Marini	Honda HRC Castrol	Honda	1:28.851	N/A	14	5
16	25	(Spain) Raúl Fernández	Trackhouse MotoGP Team	Aprilia	1:28.925	N/A	15	5
17	36	(Spain) Joan Mir	Honda HRC Castrol	Honda	1:28.989	N/A	16	6
18	42	(Spain) Álex Rins	Monster Energy Yamaha MotoGP Team	Yamaha	1:29.228	N/A	17	6
19	79	(Japan) Ai Ogura	Trackhouse MotoGP Team	Aprilia	1:30.104	N/A	18	6
20	32	(Italy) Lorenzo Savadori	Aprilia Racing	Aprilia	1:31.892	N/A	19	7
OFFICIAL MOTOGP QUALIFYING TIMES REPORT

=== Moto2 ===
Fastest session lap

Pos.	No.	Biker	Team	Constructor	Qualifying times		Final grid	Row
Pos.	No.	Biker	Team	Constructor	P1	P2	Final grid	Row
1	96	(United Kingdom) Jake Dixon	Elf Marc VDS Racing Team	Boscoscuro	1:34.088	1:33.487	1	1
2	7	(Belgium) Barry Baltus	Fantic Racing Lino Sonego	Kalex	1:33.931	1:33.557	2	1
3	14	(Italy) Tony Arbolino	Blu Cru Pramac Yamaha Moto2	Boscoscuro	Qualified in Q2	1:33.562	3	1
4	81	(Australia) Senna Agius	Liqui Moly Dynavolt Intact GP	Kalex	Qualified in Q2	1:33.588	4	2
5	75	(Spain) Albert Arenas	Italjet Gresini Moto2	Kalex	1:34.507	1:34.830	5	2
6	53	(Turkey) Deniz Öncü	Red Bull KTM Ajo	Kalex	Qualified in Q2	1:33.588	6	2
7	24	(Spain) Marcos Ramírez	OnlyFans American Racing Team	Kalex	Qualified in Q2	1:35.165	7	3
8	21	(Spain) Alonso López	Folladore SpeedRS Team	Boscoscuro	Qualified in Q2	1:35.279	8	3
9	4	(Spain) Iván Ortolá	QJMotor – Frinsa – MSi	Boscoscuro	Qualified in Q2	1:35.305	9	3
10	16	(United States) Joe Roberts	OnlyFans American Racing Team	Kalex	Qualified in Q2	1:35.473	10	4
11	28	(Spain) Izan Guevara	Blu Cru Pramac Yamaha Moto2	Boscoscuro	1:34.499	1:35.867	11	4
12	44	(Spain) Arón Canet	Fantic Racing Lino Sonego	Kalex	Qualified in Q2	1:36.203	12	4
13	71	(Japan) Ayumu Sasaki	RW-Idrofoglia Racing GP	Kalex	Qualified in Q2	1:36.273	13	5
14	12	(Czech Republic) Filip Salač	Elf Marc VDS Racing Team	Boscoscuro	Qualified in Q2	1:36.700	14	5
15	27	(Spain) Daniel Holgado	CFMoto Inde Aspar Team	Kalex	Qualified in Q2	1:37.114	15	5
16	18	(Spain) Manuel González	Liqui Moly Dynavolt Intact GP	Kalex	Qualified in Q2	1:38.199	16	6
17	80	(Colombia) David Alonso	CFMoto Inde Aspar Team	Kalex	Qualified in Q2	1:38.495	17	6
18	13	(Italy) Celestino Vietti	Folladore SpeedRS Team	Boscoscuro	Qualified in Q2	1:39.905	18	6
19	92	(Japan) Yuki Kunii	Idemitsu Honda Team Asia	Kalex	1:34.883	N/A	19	7
20	11	(Spain) Alex Escrig	Klint Forward Factory Team	Forward	1:34.892	N/A	20	7
21	15	(South Africa) Darryn Binder	Italjet Gresini Moto2	Kalex	1:34.915	N/A	21	7
22	84	(Netherlands) Zonta van den Goorbergh	RW-Idrofoglia Racing GP	Kalex	1:35.202	N/A	22	8
23	95	(Netherlands) Collin Veijer	Red Bull KTM Ajo	Kalex	1:35.408	N/A	23	8
24	9	(Spain) Jorge Navarro	Klint Forward Factory Team	Forward	1:35.815	N/A	24	8
25	10	(Brazil) Diogo Moreira	Italtrans Racing Team	Kalex	1:36.177	N/A	25	9
26	23	(Japan) Taiga Hada	Idemitsu Honda Team Asia	Kalex	1:36.519	N/A	26	9
27	61	(Spain) Eric Fernández	QJMotor – Frinsa – MSi	Boscoscuro	1:36.608	N/A	27	9
28	99	(Spain) Adrián Huertas	Italtrans Racing Team	Kalex	1:36.637	N/A	28	10
OFFICIAL MOTO2 QUALIFYING TIMES REPORT

=== Moto3 ===
Fastest session lap

Pos.	No.	Biker	Team	Constructor	Qualifying times		Final grid	Row
Pos.	No.	Biker	Team	Constructor	P1	P2	Final grid	Row
1	19	(United Kingdom) Scott Ogden	CIP Green Power	KTM	Qualified in Q2	1:35.001	1	1
2	22	(Spain) David Almansa	Leopard Racing	Honda	Qualified in Q2	1:35.043	2	1
3	94	(Italy) Guido Pini	Liqui Moly Dynavolt Intact GP	KTM	Qualified in Q2	1:35.135	3	1
4	64	(Spain) David Muñoz	Liqui Moly Dynavolt Intact GP	KTM	Qualified in Q2	1:35.155	4	2
5	83	(Spain) Álvaro Carpe	Red Bull KTM Ajo	KTM	Qualified in Q2	1:35.252	5	2
6	31	(Spain) Adrián Fernández	Leopard Racing	Honda	Qualified in Q2	1:35.348	6	2
7	28	(Spain) Máximo Quiles	CFMoto Gaviota Aspar Team	KTM	Qualified in Q2	1:35.356	7	3
8	14	(New Zealand) Cormac Buchanan	Denssi Racing – BOE	KTM	1:35.514	1:35.372	8	3
9	8	(United Kingdom) Eddie O'Shea	GRYD - Mlav Racing	Honda	1:35.934	1:35.539	9	3
10	36	(Spain) Ángel Piqueras	Frinsa – MT Helmets – MSI	KTM	Qualified in Q2	1:35.604	10	4
11	89	(Spain) Marcos Uriarte	LEVELUP-MTA	KTM	Qualified in Q2	1:35.628	21	4
12	99	(Spain) José Antonio Rueda	Red Bull KTM Ajo	KTM	Qualified in Q2	1:35.631	12	4
13	66	(Australia) Joel Kelso	LEVELUP-MTA	KTM	Qualified in Q2	1:35.873	13	5
14	55	(Switzerland) Noah Dettwiler	CIP Green Power	KTM	1:36.255	35.978	14	5
15	73	(Argentina) Valentín Perrone	Red Bull KTM Tech3	KTM	1:35.675	1:36.006	15	5
16	6	(Japan) Ryusei Yamanaka	Frinsa – MT Helmets – MSI	KTM	Qualified in Q2	1:36.076	16	6
17	72	(Japan) Taiyo Furusato	Honda Team Asia	Honda	Qualified in Q2	1:36.351	17	6
18	12	(Australia) Jacob Roulstone	Red Bull KTM Tech3	KTM	Qualified in Q2	1:36.502	18	6
19	10	(Italy) Nicola Carraro	Rivacold Snipers Team	Honda	1:36.270	N/A	19	7
20	25	(Italy) Leonardo Abruzzo	DENSSI Racing - BOE	KTM	1:36.779	N/A	20	7
21	5	(Thailand) Tatchakorn Buasri	Honda Team Asia	Honda	1:37.758	N/A	21	7
22	54	(Italy) Riccardo Rossi	Rivacold Snipers Team	Honda	1:37.767	N/A	22	8
23	82	(Italy) Stefano Nepa	Sic58 Squadra Corse	Honda	1:38.047	N/A	23	8
24	71	(Italy) Dennis Foggia	CFMoto Gaviota Aspar Team	KTM	1:39.155	N/A	24	8
25	48	(Switzerland) Lenoxx Phommara	Sic58 Squadra Corse	Honda	1:42.064	N/A	25	9
OFFICIAL MOTO3 QUALIFYING TIMES REPORT

== MotoGP Sprint ==
The MotoGP Sprint was held on 12 July 2025.

Pos.	No.	Rider	Team	Manufacturer	Laps	Time/Retired	Grid	Points
1	93	(Spain) Marc Márquez	Ducati Lenovo Team	Ducati	15	22:25.747	1	12
2	72	(Italy) Marco Bezzecchi	Aprilia Racing	Aprilia	15	+0.938	3	9
3	20	(France) Fabio Quartararo	Monster Energy Yamaha MotoGP Team	Yamaha	15	+4.361	7	7
4	49	(Italy) Fabio Di Giannantonio	Pertamina Enduro VR46 Racing Team	Ducati	15	+4.683	8	6
5	43	(Australia) Jack Miller	Prima Pramac Yamaha MotoGP	Yamaha	15	+9.405	9	5
6	33	(South Africa) Brad Binder	Red Bull KTM Factory Racing	KTM	15	+11.720	10	4
7	5	(France) Johann Zarco	Castrol Honda LCR	Honda	15	+12.090	2	3
8	73	(Spain) Álex Márquez	BK8 Gresini Racing MotoGP	Ducati	15	+12.347	6	2
9	37	(Spain) Pedro Acosta	Red Bull KTM Factory Racing	KTM	15	+17.236	5	1
10	54	(Spain) Fermín Aldeguer	BK8 Gresini Racing MotoGP	Ducati	15	+18.728	13	
11	88	(Portugal) Miguel Oliveira	Prima Pramac Yamaha MotoGP	Yamaha	15	+19.486	12	
12	63	(Italy) Francesco Bagnaia	Ducati Lenovo Team	Ducati	15	+20.339	11	
13	25	(Spain) Raúl Fernández	Trackhouse MotoGP Team	Aprilia	15	+21.978	15	
14	36	(Spain) Joan Mir	Honda HRC Castrol	Honda	15	+23.077	16	
15	42	(Spain) Álex Rins	Monster Energy Yamaha MotoGP Team	Yamaha	15	+23.575	17	
16	10	(Italy) Luca Marini	Honda HRC Castrol	Honda	15	+29.220	14	
17	79	(Japan) Ai Ogura	Trackhouse MotoGP Team	Aprilia	15	+31.433	18	
18	32	(Italy) Lorenzo Savadori	Aprilia Racing	Aprilia	15	+50.698	19	
Ret	21	(Italy) Franco Morbidelli	Pertamina Enduro VR46 Racing Team	Ducati	2	Accident	4	
DNS	12	(Spain) Maverick Viñales	Red Bull KTM Tech3	KTM		Injury^{1}	—	
Fastest sprint lap: (Italy) Fabio Di Giannantonio (Ducati) – 1:31.723 (lap 4)
OFFICIAL MOTOGP SPRINT REPORT

Notes

- ^1 - Maverick Viñales withdrew from the Race after dislocating his shoulder following a crash in qualifying. The riders behind him on the grid each moved up one position.

== Warm Up ==
=== Warm Up MotoGP ===
Pos.	No.	Biker	Team	Constructor	
Pos.	No.	Biker	Team	Constructor	Time results
1	93	(Spain) Marc Márquez	Ducati Lenovo Team	Ducati	1:28.802
2	5	(France) Johann Zarco	CASTROL Honda LCR	Honda	1:28.897
3	88	(Portugal) Miguel Oliveira	Prima Pramac Yamaha MotoGP	Yamaha	1:29.530
4	37	(Spain) Pedro Acosta	Red Bull KTM Factory Racing	KTM	1:29.619
5	73	(Spain) Álex Márquez	BK8 Gresini Racing MotoGP	Ducati	1:29.665
6	20	(France) Fabio Quartararo	Monster Energy Yamaha MotoGP Team	Yamaha	1:29.723
7	10	(Italy) Luca Marini	Honda HRC Castrol	Honda	1:29.730
8	36	(Spain) Joan Mir	Honda HRC Castrol	Honda	1:29.752
9	72	(Italy) Marco Bezzecchi	Aprilia Racing	Aprilia	1:29.867
10	63	(Italy) Francesco Bagnaia	Ducati Lenovo Team	Ducati	1:29.890
11	43	(Australia) Jack Miller	Prima Pramac Yamaha MotoGP	Yamaha	1:29.905
12	33	(South Africa) Brad Binder	Red Bull KTM Factory Racing	KTM	1:29.983
13	25	(Spain) Raúl Fernández	Trackhouse MotoGP Team	Aprilia	1:30.006
14	54	(Spain) Fermín Aldeguer	BK8 Gresini Racing MotoGP	Ducati	1:30.053
15	79	(Japan) Ai Ogura	Trackhouse MotoGP Team	Aprilia	1:30.866
16	49	(Italy) Fabio Di Giannantonio	Pertamina Enduro VR46 Racing Team	Ducati	1:31.002
17	32	(Italy) Lorenzo Savadori	Aprilia Racing	Aprilia	1:31.172
18	42	(Spain) Álex Rins	Monster Energy Yamaha MotoGP Team	Yamaha	1:31.361
OFFICIAL MOTOGP WARM UP TIMES REPORT

== Race ==
=== MotoGP ===
Pos.	No.	Rider	Team	Manufacturer	Laps	Time/Retired	Grid	Points
1	93	(Spain) Marc Márquez	Ducati Lenovo Team	Ducati	30	40:42.854	1	25
2	73	(Spain) Álex Márquez	BK8 Gresini Racing MotoGP	Ducati	30	+6.380	5	20
3	63	(Italy) Francesco Bagnaia	Ducati Lenovo Team	Ducati	30	+7.080	10	16
4	20	(France) Fabio Quartararo	Monster Energy Yamaha MotoGP Team	Yamaha	30	+18.738	6	13
5	54	(Spain) Fermín Aldeguer	BK8 Gresini Racing MotoGP	Ducati	30	+18.916	12	11
6	10	(Italy) Luca Marini	Honda HRC Castrol	Honda	30	+24.743	13	10
7	33	(South Africa) Brad Binder	Red Bull KTM Factory Racing	KTM	30	+24.820	9	9
8	43	(Australia) Jack Miller	Prima Pramac Yamaha MotoGP	Yamaha	30	+25.757	8	8
9	25	(Spain) Raúl Fernández	Trackhouse MotoGP Team	Aprilia	30	+25.859	14	7
10	42	(Spain) Álex Rins	Monster Energy Yamaha MotoGP Team	Yamaha	30	+39.419	16	6
Ret	36	(Spain) Joan Mir	Honda HRC Castrol	Honda	21	Accident	15	
Ret	79	(Japan) Ai Ogura	Trackhouse MotoGP Team	Aprilia	21	Accident	17	
Ret	72	(Italy) Marco Bezzecchi	Aprilia Racing	Aprilia	20	Accident	3	
Ret	32	(Italy) Lorenzo Savadori	Aprilia Racing	Aprilia	19	Accident	18	
Ret	49	(Italy) Fabio Di Giannantonio	Pertamina Enduro VR46 Racing Team	Ducati	17	Accident	7	
Ret	5	(France) Johann Zarco	Castrol Honda LCR	Honda	17	Accident	2	
Ret	37	(Spain) Pedro Acosta	Red Bull KTM Factory Racing	KTM	3	Accident	4	
Ret	88	(Portugal) Miguel Oliveira	Prima Pramac Yamaha MotoGP	Yamaha	2	Accident	11	
DNS	21	(Italy) Franco Morbidelli	Pertamina Enduro VR46 Racing Team	Ducati		Injury^{2}	—	
Fastest lap: (Spain) Marc Márquez (Ducati) – 1:20.704 (lap 5)
OFFICIAL MOTOGP RACE REPORT

Notes

- ^2 - Franco Morbidelli withdrew from the Grand Prix due to pain in his shoulder. The riders behind him on the grid each moved up one position.

=== Moto2 ===
The race, scheduled to be run for 25 laps, was red-flagged after 20 laps due to an incident between Marcos Ramírez and Albert Arenas.

Pos.	No.	Rider	Team	Manufacturer	Laps	Time/Retired	Grid	Points
1	53	(Turkey) Deniz Öncü	Red Bull KTM Ajo	Kalex	20	28:02.843	6	25
2	7	(Belgium) Barry Baltus	Fantic Racing Lino Sonego	Kalex	20	+0.129	2	20
3	96	(United Kingdom) Jake Dixon	Elf Marc VDS Racing Team	Boscoscuro	20	+1.131	1	16
4	18	(Spain) Manuel González	Liqui Moly Dynavolt Intact GP	Kalex	20	+2.916	16	13
5	13	(Italy) Celestino Vietti	Folladore SpeedRS Team	Boscoscuro	22	+3.067	18	11
6	16	(United States) Joe Roberts	OnlyFans American Racing Team	Kalex	20	+4.251	10	10
7	44	(Spain) Arón Canet	Fantic Racing Lino Sonego	Kalex	20	+6.359	12	9
8	28	(Spain) Izan Guevara	Blu Cru Pramac Yamaha Moto2	Boscoscuro	20	+8.241	11	8
9	71	(Japan) Ayumu Sasaki	RW-Idrofoglia Racing GP	Kalex	22	+8.489	13	7
10	12	(Czech Republic) Filip Salač	Elf Marc VDS Racing Team	Boscoscuro	20	+8.584	14	6
11	81	(Australia) Senna Agius	Liqui Moly Dynavolt Intact GP	Kalex	22	+8.756	4	5
12	27	(Spain) Daniel Holgado	CFMoto Inde Aspar Team	Kalex	22	+9.016	15	4
13	4	(Spain) Iván Ortolá	QJMotor – Frinsa – MSi	Boscoscuro	20	+10.403	9	3
14	9	(Spain) Jorge Navarro	Klint Forward Factory Team	Forward	20	+18.381	24	2
15	15	(South Africa) Darryn Binder	Italjet Gresini Moto2	Kalex	20	+18.583	21	1
16	95	(Netherlands) Collin Veijer	Red Bull KTM Ajo	Kalex	22	+18.982	23	
17	84	(Netherlands) Zonta van den Goorbergh	RW-Idrofoglia Racing GP	Kalex	22	+19.101	22	
18	99	(Spain) Adrián Huertas	Italtrans Racing Team	Kalex	20	+19.159	28	
19	92	(Japan) Yuki Kunii	Idemitsu Honda Team Asia	Kalex	20	+19.819	19	
20	11	(Spain) Alex Escrig	Klint Forward Factory Team	Forward	22	+23.981	20	
21	23	(Japan) Taiga Hada	Idemitsu Honda Team Asia	Kalex	20	+27.901	26	
Ret	75	(Spain) Albert Arenas	Italjet Gresini Moto2	Kalex	22	Crashed out	5	
Ret	24	(Spain) Marcos Ramírez	OnlyFans American Racing Team	Kalex	22	Crashed out	7	
Ret	10	(Brazil) Diogo Moreira	Italtrans Racing Team	Kalex	15	Creshed out	25	
Ret	80	(Colombia) David Alonso	CFMoto European Privilege Aspar Team	Kalex	15	Crashed out	17	
Ret	14	(Italy) Tony Arbolino	Blu Cru Pramac Yamaha Moto2	Boscoscuro	6	Crashed out	3	
Ret	61	(Spain) Eric Fernández	QJMotor – Frinsa – MSi	Boscoscuro	4	Crashed out	27	
Ret	21	(Spain) Alonso López	Folladore SpeedRS Team	Boscoscuro	1	Crashed out	8	
Fastest lap: (Brazil) Diogo Moreira (Kalex) - 1:23.270 (lap 3)
OFFICIAL MOTO2 RACE REPORT

=== Moto3 ===
Pos.	No.	Rider	Team	Manufacturer	Laps	Time/Retired	Grid	Points
1	64	(Spain) David Muñoz	Liqui Moly Dynavolt Intact GP	KTM	23	33:27.081	4	25
2	28	(Spain) Máximo Quiles	CFMoto Gaviota Aspar Team	KTM	23	+0.241	7	20
3	99	(Spain) José Antonio Rueda	Red Bull KTM Ajo	KTM	23	+0.250	12	16
4	36	(Spain) Ángel Piqueras	Frinsa – MT Helmets – MSI	KTM	23	+0.298	10	13
5	83	(Spain) Álvaro Carpe	Red Bull KTM Ajo	KTM	23	+0.335	5	11
6	66	(Australia) Joel Kelso	LEVELUP-MTA	KTM	23	+0.563	13	10
7	94	(Italy) Guido Pini	Liqui Moly Dynavolt Intact GP	KTM	23	+0.645	3	9
8	12	(Australia) Jacob Roulstone	Red Bull KTM Tech3	KTM	23	+0.893	18	8
9	14	(New Zealand) Cormac Buchanan	Denssi Racing – BOE	KTM	23	+1.505	8	7
10	89	(Spain) Marcos Uriarte	LEVELUP-MTA	KTM	23	+6.518	11	6
11	71	(Italy) Dennis Foggia	CFMoto Gaviota Aspar Team	KTM	23	+9.429	24	5
12	73	(Argentina) Valentín Perrone	Red Bull KTM Tech3	KTM	23	+9.484	15	4
13	82	(Italy) Stefano Nepa	Sic58 Squadra Corse	Honda	23	+9.687	23	3
14	54	(Italy) Riccardo Rossi	Rivacold Snipers Team	Honda	23	+11.058	22	2
15	6	(Japan) Ryusei Yamanaka	Frinsa – MT Helmets – MSI	KTM	23	+12.298	16	1
16	55	(Switzerland) Noah Dettwiler	CIP Green Power	KTM	23	+27.245	14	
17	48	(Switzerland) Lenoxx Phommara	Sic58 Squadra Corse	Honda	23	+43.348	25	
18	10	(Italy) Nicola Carraro	Rivacold Snipers Team	Honda	18	+5 Laps	19	
Ret	72	(Japan) Taiyo Furusato	Honda Team Asia	Honda	22	Crashed out	17	
Ret	19	(United Kingdom) Scott Ogden	CIP Green Power	KTM	19	Crashed out	1	
Ret	22	(Spain) David Almansa	Leopard Racing	Honda	14	Crashed out	2	
Ret	5	(Thailand) Tatchakorn Buasri	Honda Team Asia	Honda	10	Retired	21	
Ret	31	(Spain) Adrián Fernández	Leopard Racing	Honda	8	Crashed out	6	
Ret	8	(United Kingdom) Eddie O'Shea	GRYD - Mlav Racing	Honda	3	Crashed out	9	
Ret	25	(Italy) Leonardo Abruzzo	GRYD - Mlav Racing	Honda	3	Crashed out	20	
Fastest lap: (Spain) Ángel Piqueras (KTM) - 1:26.547 (lap 21)
OFFICIAL MOTO3 RACE REPORT

== Championship standings after the race ==
Below are the standings for the top five riders, constructors, and teams after the round.

=== MotoGP ===
Riders' Championship standings

	Pos.	Rider	Points
	1	(Spain) Marc Márquez	344
	2	(Spain) Álex Márquez	261
	3	(Italy) Francesco Bagnaia	197
1	4	(Italy) Fabio Di Giannantonio	142
1	5	(Italy) Franco Morbidelli	139

Constructors' Championship standings

Pos.	Constructor	Points
1	(Italy) Ducati	393
2	(Italy) Aprilia	161
3	(Austria) KTM	150
4	(Japan) Honda	141
5	(Japan) Yamaha	118

Teams' Championship standings

Pos.	Team	Points
1	(Italy) Ducati Lenovo Team	541
2	(Italy) BK8 Gresini Racing MotoGP	353
3	(Italy) Pertamina Enduro VR46 Racing Team	281
4	(Austria) Red Bull KTM Factory Racing	159
5	(Italy) Aprilia Racing	138

=== Moto2 ===
Riders' Championship standings

Pos.	Rider	Points
1	(Spain) Manuel González	172
2	(Spain) Arón Canet	163
3	(Brazil) Diogo Moreira	128
4	(United Kingdom) Jake Dixon	114
5	(Belgium) Barry Baltus	114

Constructors' Championship standings

Pos.	Constructor	Points
1	(Germany) Kalex	258
2	(Italy) Boscoscuro	150
3	(Switzerland) Forward	13

Teams' Championship standings

	Pos.	Team	Points
	1	(Italy) Fantic Racing Lino Sonego	277
	2	(Germany) Liqui Moly Dynavolt Intact GP	264
	3	(Belgium) Elf Marc VDS Racing Team	172
1	4	(Italy) Folladore SpeedRS Team	137
1	5	(Italy) Italtrans Racing Team	133

=== Moto3 ===
Riders' Championship standings

	Pos.	Rider	Points
	1	(Spain) José Antonio Rueda	203
1	2	(Spain) Ángel Piqueras	130
1	3	(Spain) Álvaro Carpe	129
	4	(Australia) Joel Kelso	110
1	5	(Spain) David Muñoz	107

Constructors' Championship standings

Pos.	Constructor	Points
1	(Austria) KTM	275
2	(Japan) Honda	139

Teams' Championship standings

	Pos.	Team	Points
	1	(Finland) Red Bull KTM Ajo	332
	2	(Spain) Frinsa – MT Helmets – MSi	191
	3	(Italy) LevelUp – MTA	169
	4	(Spain) CFMoto Gaviota Aspar Team	168
1	5	(Germany) Liqui Moly Dynavolt Intact GP	145

== Notes ==
Previous race: 2025 Dutch TT	FIM Grand Prix World Championship; 2025 season	Next race: 2025 Czech Republic Grand Prix
Previous race: 2024 German Grand Prix	German motorcycle Grand Prix	Next race: 2026 German Grand Prix
