= KTM =

Austrian motorcycle and sports car manufacturer

KTM AG

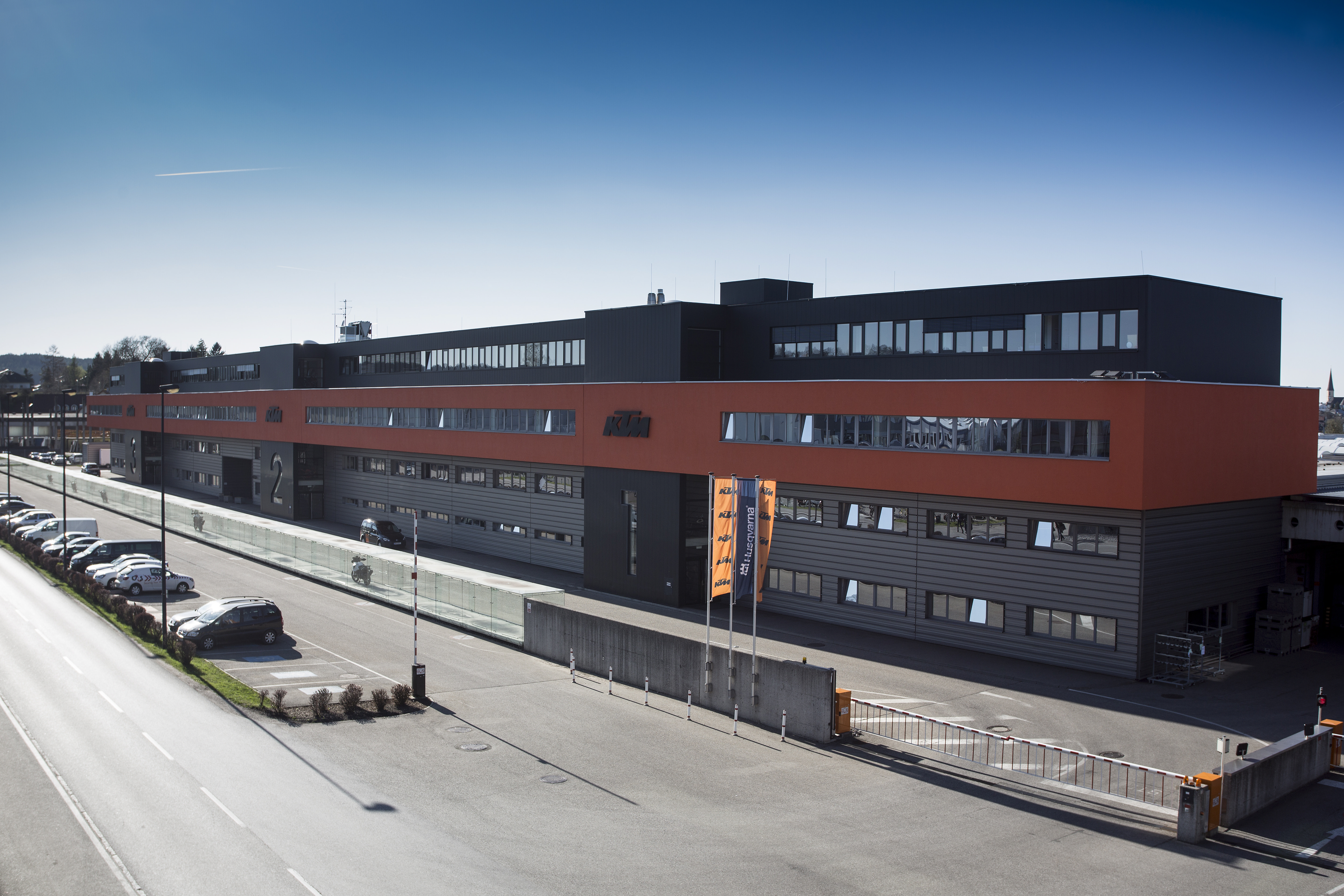
- KTM Motorcycles headquarters in Mattighofen
- Type: Private
- Industry: Motor vehicles
- Founded: 1934 (92 years ago)
- Founder: Hans Trunkenpolz
- Headquarters: Mattighofen, Upper Austria, Austria
- Area served: Worldwide
- Key people: Gottfried Neumeister (chairman and CEO of the executive board)
- Products: Motorcycles, sports cars
- Owner: Bajaj Auto (≈100% via Bajaj Mobility AG)
- Number of employees: ▲2,931 (2017)
- Parent: Bajaj Mobility
- Subsidiaries: Red Bull KTM Factory Racing; GasGas; WP Suspension; Husqvarna Motorcycles
- Website: ktmgroup.com ktm.com

KTM Fahrrad GmbH
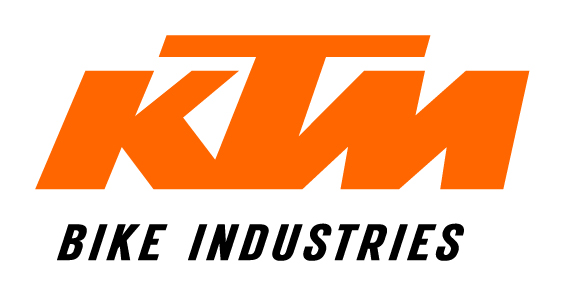
- Type: Private
- Industry: Bicycles
- Founded: 1934; 92 years ago
- Founder: Hans Trunkenpolz
- Headquarters: Wels, Upper Austria, Austria
- Key people: Carol Urkauf-Chen; Johanna Urkauf; Stefan Limbrunner
- Owner: Bajaj Auto (100% via Bajaj Mobility AG)
- Number of employees: 800 (2022)
- Website: www.ktm-bikes.at

KTM AG (German pronunciation: [ˌkɑːˌteːˈɛm]) is an Austrian motorcycle, bicycle and motorsports brand. It traces its foundation to 1934, as Kronreif & Trunkenpolz Mattighofen. Today, Bajaj Mobility AG (formerly Pierer Mobility AG) operates as the manufacturer of KTM-branded motorcycles, and KTM Fahrrad GmbH operates as the manufacturer of KTM-branded bicycles.

KTM is known for its off-road motorcycles and as a reputed MotoGP constructor.

In November 2025, it was announced that Bajaj Auto had completed the acquisition of a controlling stake in KTM for €800 million, increasing its indirect holding to approximately 75%.

== History ==
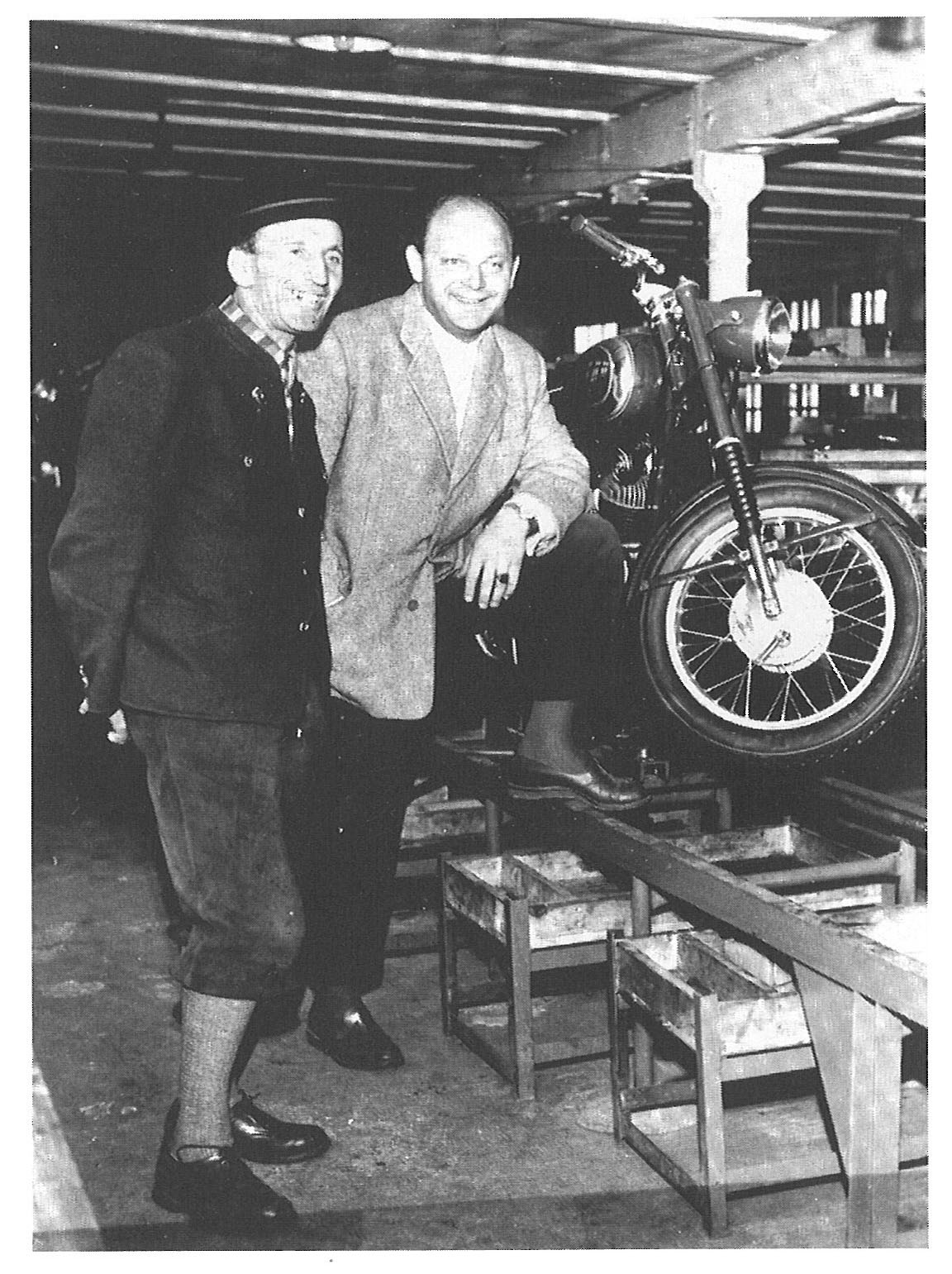
Hans Trunkenpolz and Ernst Kronreif

=== Early years ===
In 1934, Austrian engineer Johann (Hans) Trunkenpolz (1909–1962) set up a fitter's and car repair shop in Mattighofen. In 1937, he started selling DKW motorcycles, and Opel cars the following year. His shop was known as Kraftfahrzeug Trunkenpolz Mattighofen, but the name was unregistered. During the Second World War, his wife took care of the business which was thriving mainly on account of diesel engine repairs.

After the war, demand for repair works fell sharply and Trunkenpolz started thinking about producing his own motorcycles. The prototype of his first motorcycle, the R100, was built in 1951. The components of the motorcycle were produced in house, except for the Rotax engines which were made by Fichtel & Sachs. Serial production of the R100 started in 1953. With just 20 employees, motorcycles were built at a rate of three per day.

=== Kronreif & Trunkenpolz Era (1953–1991) ===
In 1953, businessman Ernst Kronreif became a major shareholder of the company, which was renamed and registered as Kronreif & Trunkenpolz Mattighofen. In 1954, the R125 Tourist was introduced, followed by the Grand Tourist and the scooter Mirabell in 1955.

The company secured its first racing title in the 1954 Austrian 125cc national championship. In 1956, KTM made its appearance at the International Six Days Trials, where Egon Dornauer won a gold medal on a KTM machine.

In 1957, KTM built its first sports motorcycle, the Trophy 125cc. KTM's first moped, named Mecky, was launched in 1957, followed by Ponny I in 1960 and Ponny II in 1962 and Comet in 1963. The 1960s also saw the beginning of bicycle production in Mattighofen.

Ernst Kronreif died in 1960. Two years later in 1962, Hans Trunkenpolz also died of a heart attack. His son, Erich Trunkenpolz, took charge of the company's management.

As the company continued to expand, the workforce totaled 400 in 1971, and forty years after it was founded, KTM was offering 42 different models. Additionally, KTM was able to produce motorcycles for the racing industry and began producing motorcycles for John Penton. During the 1970s and 80s, KTM also started to develop and produce engines and radiators. Radiators sold to European car manufacturers constituted a sizable part of the company's business in the 1980s.

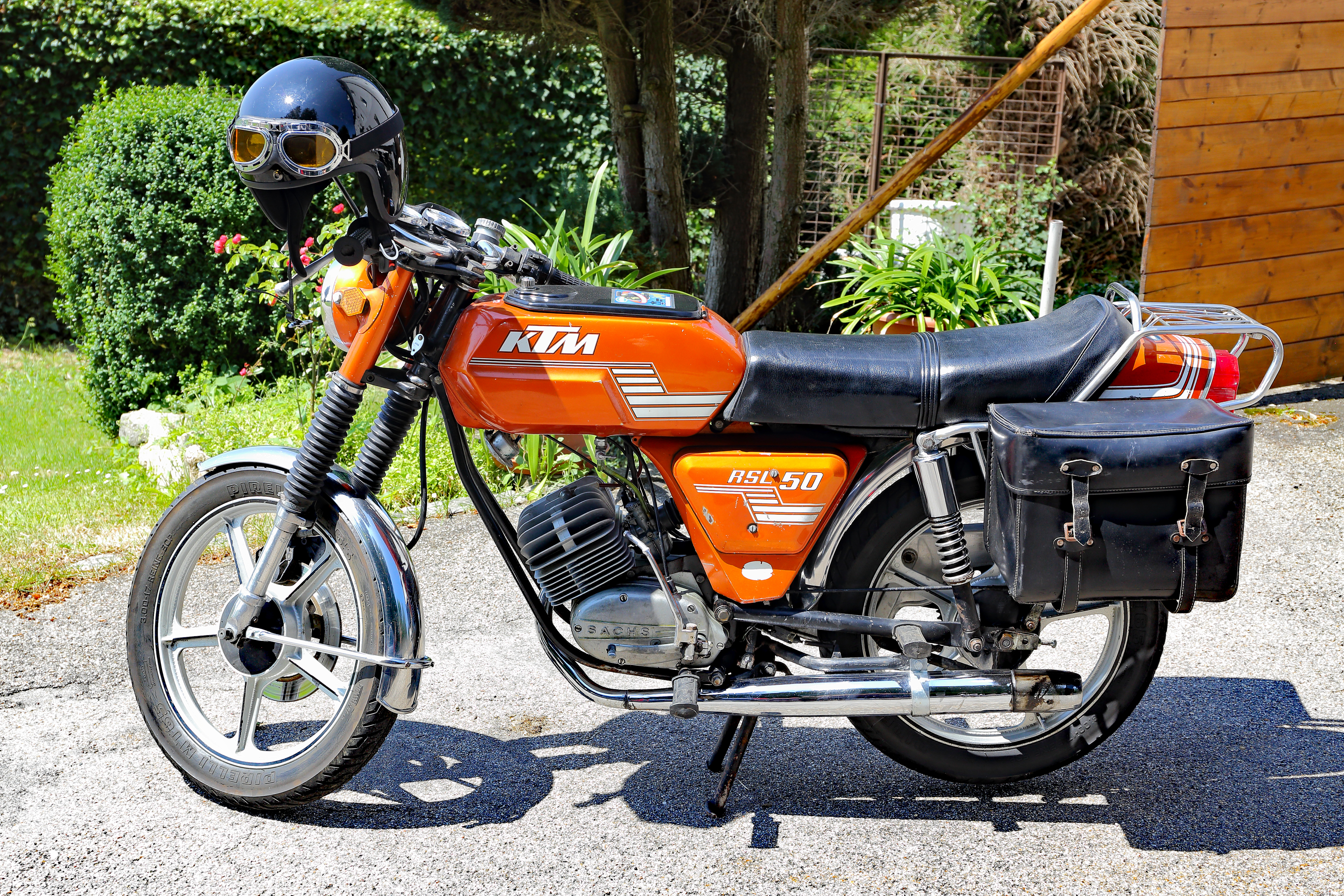
KTM 50 RSL (1977)

In 1978, US subsidiary KTM North America Inc. was founded in Lorain, Ohio.

In 1980, the company was renamed KTM Motor-Fahrzeugbau KG. One year later, KTM had about 700 employees and a turnover of 750m. schilling (about 54.5m. euros). International business then amounted to 76% of the company's turnover.

However, scooter and moped turnover sank rapidly, and production had to be halted in 1988. Erich Trunkenpolz died in 1989. Takeover of a 51% interest in the company by the Austrian investment trust GIT Trust Holding controlled by Austrian politician Josef Taus in 1989 was followed by unsuccessful attempts to turn the indebted company around, and in 1991, management of KTM was transferred to a consortium of creditor banks.

In 1991, the company was split into four new entities: KTM Sportmotorcycle GmbH (motorcycles division), KTM Fahrrad GmbH (bicycles division), KTM Kühler GmbH (radiators division) and KTM Werkzeugbau GmbH (tooling division).

=== Bicycles: Urcauf Family Era (1992 onwards) ===
After the split, Urcauf family took over the bicycle division KTM Fahrrad GmbH in 1992.

In 1994, they started producing bikes with aluminium frames and electric bikes.

In 1996, Carol Urkauf-Chen takes over the company.

In 1998, they adopt orange colour in their logo.

In 2006 they launch bikes with full carbon frame.

In 2007, they shift to a new headquarter in Wels, Upper Austria.

In 2018 Owner Carol Urkauf-Chen moves to the supervisory board, Johanna Urkauf and Stefan Limbrunner act as managing directors.

=== Motorcycles: Stefan Pierer Era (1992–2025) ===
Austrian automotive entrepreneur Stefan Peirer took control of KTM Motorcycles in 1992 and later took over the sibling tooling division KTM Werkzeugbau. In the following years, while steadily increasing production and turnover, investing in new production and R&D facilities, introducing new models and successfully sponsoring and taking part in various sports racing events, the company underwent a series of restructurings and stakeholder changes guided by KTM's managing director Stefan Pierer.

In 1994, KTM started production of the Duke series of road motorcycles; in 1996, KTM motocross machines were first decked out in KTM's signature orange color, and 1997 saw the introduction of liquid-cooled two-cylinder Supermoto and Adventure motorcycles. In 2007, the company debuted the KTM X-Bow sports car.

In 1995, KTM acquired Swedish motorcycle maker Husaberg AB and took control of the Dutch company WP Suspension.

In 2007, Indian motorcycle manufacturer Bajaj Auto acquired a 14.5% stake in KTM; which by 2013, increased to 47.97%.

In 2010 KTM Kühler divested their automotive radiator business to Mahle GmbH and the motorcycle radiator business to WP Suspension under WP Radiator brand.

In 2013, KTM acquired the formerly Swedish motorcycle maker Husqvarna from its prior owner BMW. The same year, KTM re-integrated the brand Husaberg into Husqvarna from which it had spun off in the 1990s when Husqvarna was sold to the Italian company Cagiva. In 2019, KTM acquired a 60% stake in the Spanish enduro motorcycle brand GasGas. In 2020 GasGas became a wholly owned subsidiary of KTM.

In 2021 Bajaj Auto sold 46.5% of KTM's shares to Pierer Mobility AG in exchange for 49% shares in the latter company and thus became an indirect stakeholder in KTM.

In 2022, Pierer Mobility acquired a 25.1% stake in Italian motorcycle company MV Agusta; and increased to a majority 50.1% in 2024.

In 2023 Pierer Mobility's financial situation became increasingly unsustainable and by 2024 they had a heavy debt to pay off. In 2024 KTM went into self imposed administration. Pierer Mobility was compelled to sell their stake in MV Agusta back to the previous owners the Sardarov family.

In the early 2025 Stefan Pierer started exiting from executives roles in KTM and its affiliates, making way for new investors.

In May 2026, KTM was accused by a consortium of European media outlets, including Le Monde, El País, Der Spiegel and ORF, of providing substantial and widespread assistance in the de-limiting of its enduro motorcycles at dealerships, in order to circumvent European emissions standards.

=== Motorcycles: Bajaj Auto Era (2025–present) ===
In 2025, Bajaj Auto, who were until now holding 49% stake in Pierer Mobility had offerred to take full control of KTM and its sister concerns by an 800 million Euro debt package. The deal was concluded in November 2025. Pierer Mobility is due to be rennamed as Bajaj Mobility which will hold 74.94% shares in KTM; rest of which lies in public hands.

== Operations ==
At present, KTM brand is operated by two corporate houses-

- Bajaj Auto — motorcycles & affiliated businesses
- KTM Fahrrad GmbH — bicycles & related businesses

=== KTM Motorcycles ===
KTM has facilities in Austria, India (partnership with Bajaj), and China (partnership with CFMoto) producing over 380,000 motorcycles (290,000 KTM models) in 2023. The main production site located at Mattighofen, Austria manufacturers majority of the models. In collaboration with Bajaj, the facility located in Pune, India is responsible for producing smaller displacement motorcycles, including the Duke and RC series, for both the domestic and international markets. KTM and CFMOTO oversee the global production of the LC8c models (790 Duke and 790 Adventure) in Hangzhou, China.

Furthermore, KTM Sportmotorcycle GmbH and Husqvarna Motorcycles GmbH operate 24 and 8 distribution subsidiaries worldwide, respectively, most of them in European and Asian countries and in the US.

==== Joint ventures ====
KTM started exporting their GS model to the US in 1968 through an American importer, John Penton under the Penton brand. This joint venture lasted until KTM established KTM America Inc. in Ohio in 1978.

In 2005, KTM-Sportmotocycle began a partnership with ATV manufacturer Polaris Industries with the goal of shared research, and more importantly shared distribution networks. This partnership was a two-year trial arrangement, at the end of which both parties had the option of merging the two companies into one. In 2006, KTM announced that the partnership with Polaris had been downgraded, and would instead only supply their 450cc and 510cc RFS engines to Polaris.

In January 2008, Bajaj announced that it would jointly develop two new 125cc and 200cc bikes for Europe and the Far East. The bikes would be badged KTM. In January 2012, Bajaj launched the Duke 200 model in India.

In November 2022 KTM acquired a 25,1 % stake in the Italian motorcycle manufacturer MV Agusta.

=== KTM Bike Industries ===
KTM as a brand is also used by KTM Fahrrad GmbH, which, as the exclusive licensee, manufactures bicycles and bicycle accessories. This company originated by the spin-off of KTM in 1991 and shares the same history and heritage as that of KTM Motorcycles.

== Motorsports ==
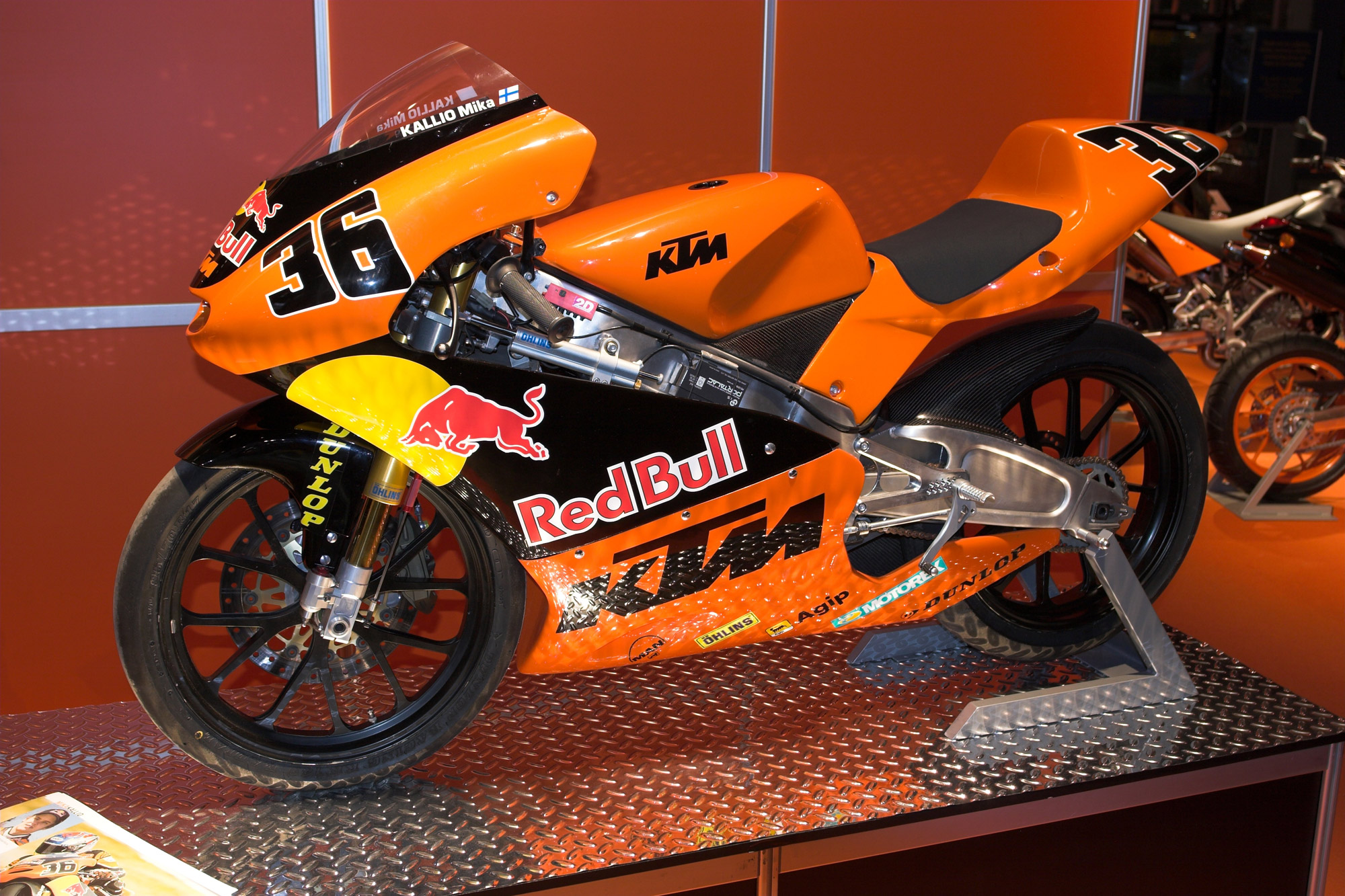
Mika Kallio's 125 cc road race motorcycle

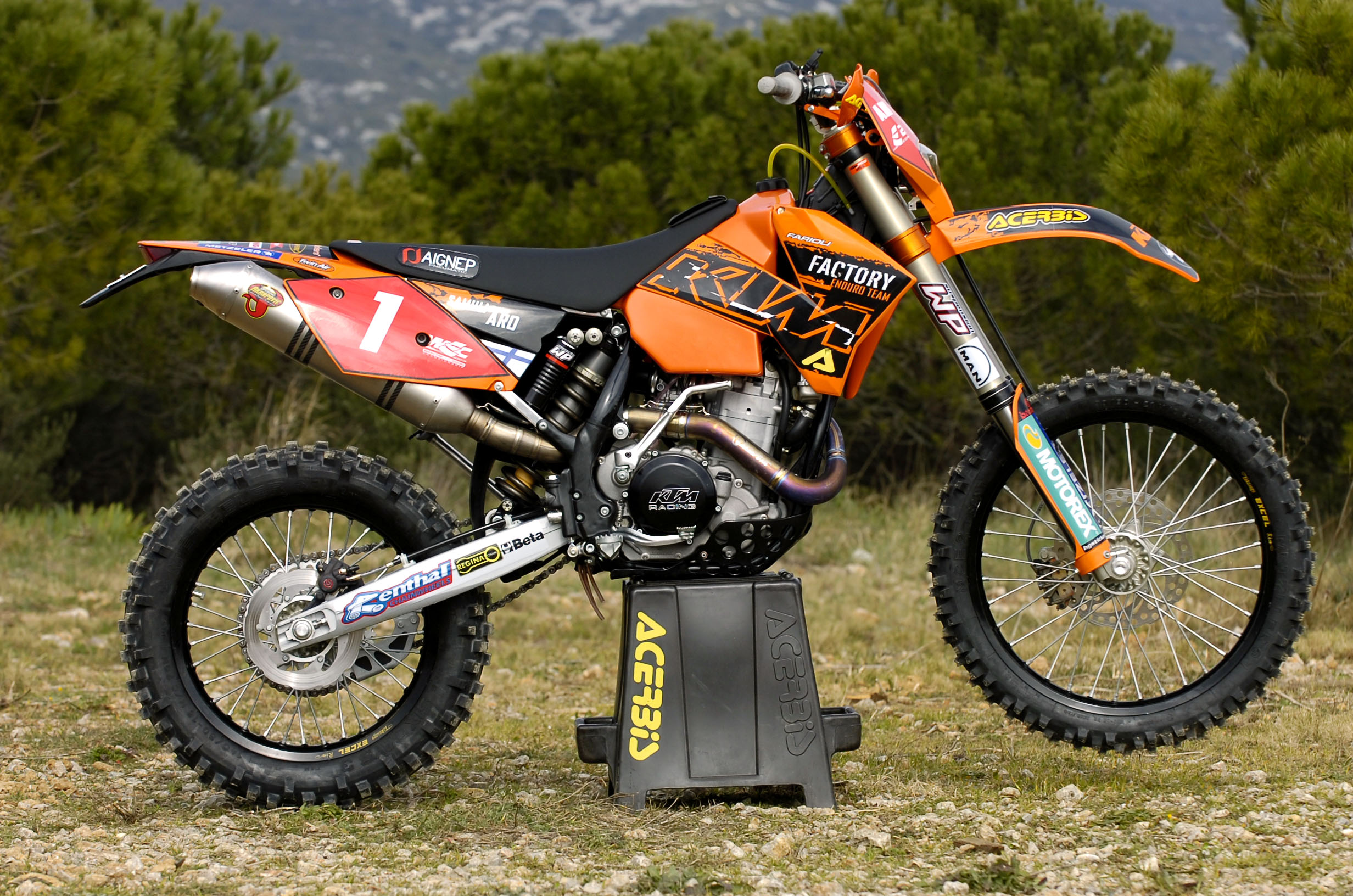
Samuli Aro's WEC E2 class bike

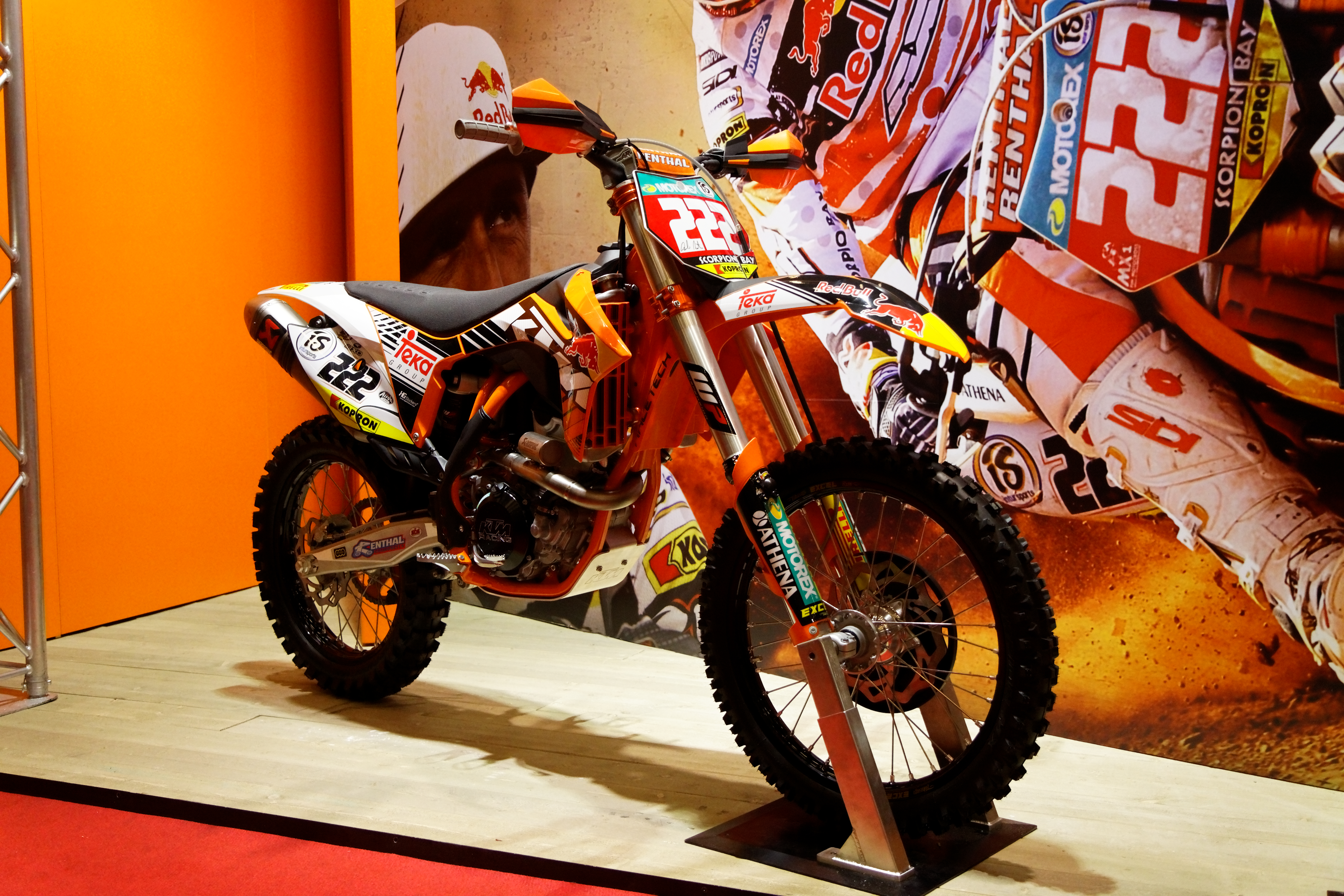
Tony Cairoli's 350 SX bike

KTM entered motorsports competing in motocross racing around 1972 after collaborations with Penton on various off-road bikes. KTM won its first motocross championship in 1974 when Gennady Moiseyev claimed the 250cc Motocross World Championship. By the end of 2016, KTM had won more than 260 world championship titles, making the company one of the most successful brands in motorsports. KTM has claimed 96 MXGP, MX1 and MX2 world titles since 1974 and 114 E1, E2, E3 and Super Enduro world titles since 1990. KTM dominated the MX1\MXGP championship with 10 wins in 15 years (2010-2024). Tony Cairoli (noted for racing the 350SX) won 5 times 2010 through 2014. With Ryan Dungey's 2015, 2016 and 2017 victories in the supercross world championship, KTM gained a successful presence in supercross racing as well. In 1994, a KTM factory team debuted at the Dakar Rally. In 1998, KTM riders won second to twelfth place. With consecutive wins from 2001 to 2019, the manufacturer has dominated the rally for 18 years now. KTM teams successfully compete in other rally raid events like the Atlas Rally or the Rallye du Maroc. KTM has won 37 cross country rallies world titles since 2003 and has won the FIM Cross-Country Rallies World Championship 15 times, most recently in 2015.

In 2003, KTM started sponsoring and supporting road racing in various capacities, with the most successful results stemming from their supermoto efforts. From 2003 to 2009, a KTM factory team competed in the 125 cc class of the motorcycle Grands Prix, and between 2005 and 2008 in the 250 cc class. Notable successes in the 125 cc class were the second and third place in the overall ranking scored in 2005 by KTM riders Mika Kallio and Gábor Talmácsi, the second place in 2006 by Mika Kallio, the third place in 2007 by Tomoyoshi Koyama and the 2005 KTM victory in the 125 cc constructor's championship. In the 250 cc class, Mika Kallio won third place in 2008. Since the first Rookies Cup season in 2007, KTM has supplied the bike for the Red Bull MotoGP Rookies Cup.

=== Grand Prix motorcycle racing ===
In 2009, KTM announced their withdrawal from Grand Prix motorcycle racing in all classes, and did not return until 2012 in the new Moto3 class.

In 2012, KTM won the Moto3 manufacturers' championship. During the next season, KTM riders prevailed in every race of the Moto3 class and won the world title as well as second and third place, making KTM the obvious victor of the manufacturers' standing. KTM won the manufacturer title in the 2014 and 2016 as well as the world title in 2016 in the Moto3 class. Starting in 2017, KTM fields bikes in both MotoGP and Moto2 classes as well. The main class team features Jack Miller and Brad Binder as full-season riders, Mika Kallio as wildcard rider, and Dani Pedrosa as test/development rider. The Moto2 KTM Ajo team features Pedro Acosta and Albert Arenas. Steadfastly independent and confident of their company's abilities, KTM chose to use a steel trellis frame where all other manufacturers used aluminum. In addition, KTM insisted on developing their own racing suspension through their WP subsidiary (all other manufacturers used Öhlins). KTM demonstrated their prowess in doing things their own way by winning their first Moto GP premier class race on August 9, 2020, with rookie Brad Binder crossing the finish line in first place.

From 2009 to 2011, KTM teams competed in the IDM, the Superbike International German Championships. There were speculations about a possible KTM foray into the superbike world championship. Due to the company's focus shifting away from the RC8 and generally superbike design, these plans are off the table for the foreseeable future.

KTM's official company/team colours are orange, black and silver. To create a brand identity, all competition-ready KTMs come from the factory with bright orange plastic with "KTM" emblazoned on the side of the radiator shrouds. All KTM bikes also come from the factory with a Motorex sticker on the outside of the motor. All first fills of oil come from Motorex as well. Some official KTM teams use different colors for their bikes, most noticeably in the Dakar Rally.

== Products ==
=== Off-road motorcycles ===
KTM manufactures a wide range of off-road motorcycles. Not all of their models are available in every country. The following section lists bikes that are sold in the US. The following off-road bikes are intended to be used for sport or competition; they do not meet homologation regulations.

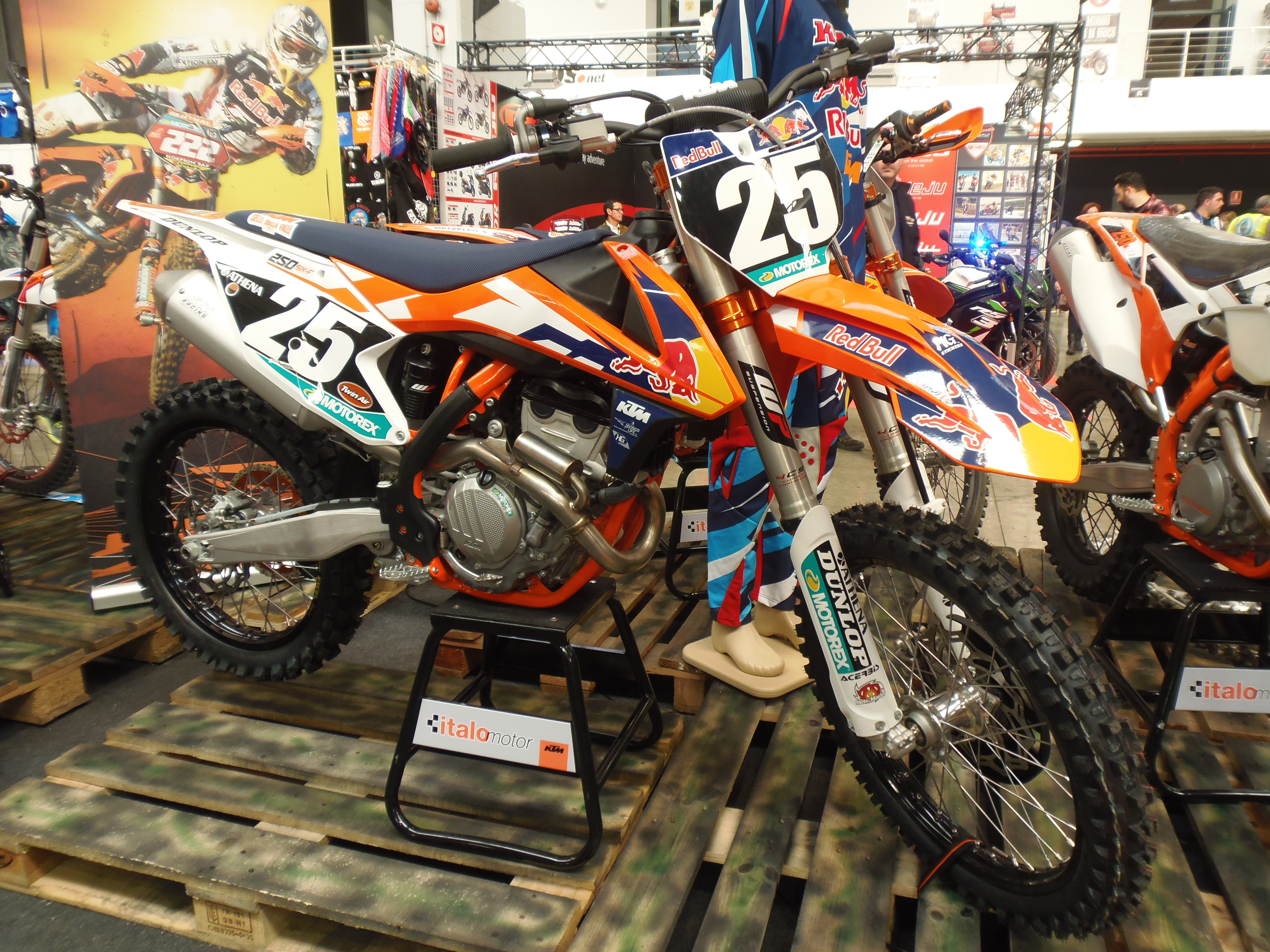
KTM 250 SX-F

Motocross – The current Motocross line designated by SX includes 50, 65, 85, 105, 125, 150, 250 and 300 cc single-cylinder two-stroke models (the 50 SX, 65 SX and 85 SX models are kids' and youth bikes), and 250, 350 and 450 cc single-cylinder four-stroke models (SX-F). In 2005 KTM released the new 250SX-F to the general public. Since 2007, the SX-F's have been KTM's new racing motocross range. Current versions of the KTM SX-F line have a dual overhead camshaft engine dubbed the “RC4”.

Cross-Country – The current cross-country line designated by XC includes 150, 250 and 300 cc two-stroke models and 250, 350 and 450 cc four-stroke models. The two-stroke XC machines except the 150 cc model are available with either wide-ratio or close-ratio transmission (when switching gears, there is a more or less pronounced rpm change). The four-stroke models are fitted with a semi-close ratio gearbox. Most models are equipped with an electric starter.

Enduro – The enduro line-up is similar to the XC's with the primary differences being plusher PDS (Note: PDS is an initialism for Progressive Damping System when referring to rear shock absorbers in non-linkage rear suspensions.") non-linkage suspensions, a wider-ratio gear box and lights. Model designations add -W (indicating wide ratio) to the XC. The European street-legal EXC is roughly the same bike as the XC-W.

Free Ride – A KTM original class of off-road motorcycle that could be described as a cross between Enduro and trials bikes. The Freeride 250R is powered by a lighter, modified version of the 250 EXC Enduro engine and has a specially developed six-speed gearbox with close transmission ratios in the lower gears and a wide ratio for the sixth gear. A four-stroke 350 cc free ride model with similar characteristics, and the all-electric single-speed models Freeride E-SX, Freeride E-XC as well as their street version Freeride E-SM are available in Europe.

=== Street and Dual Purpose Bikes ===
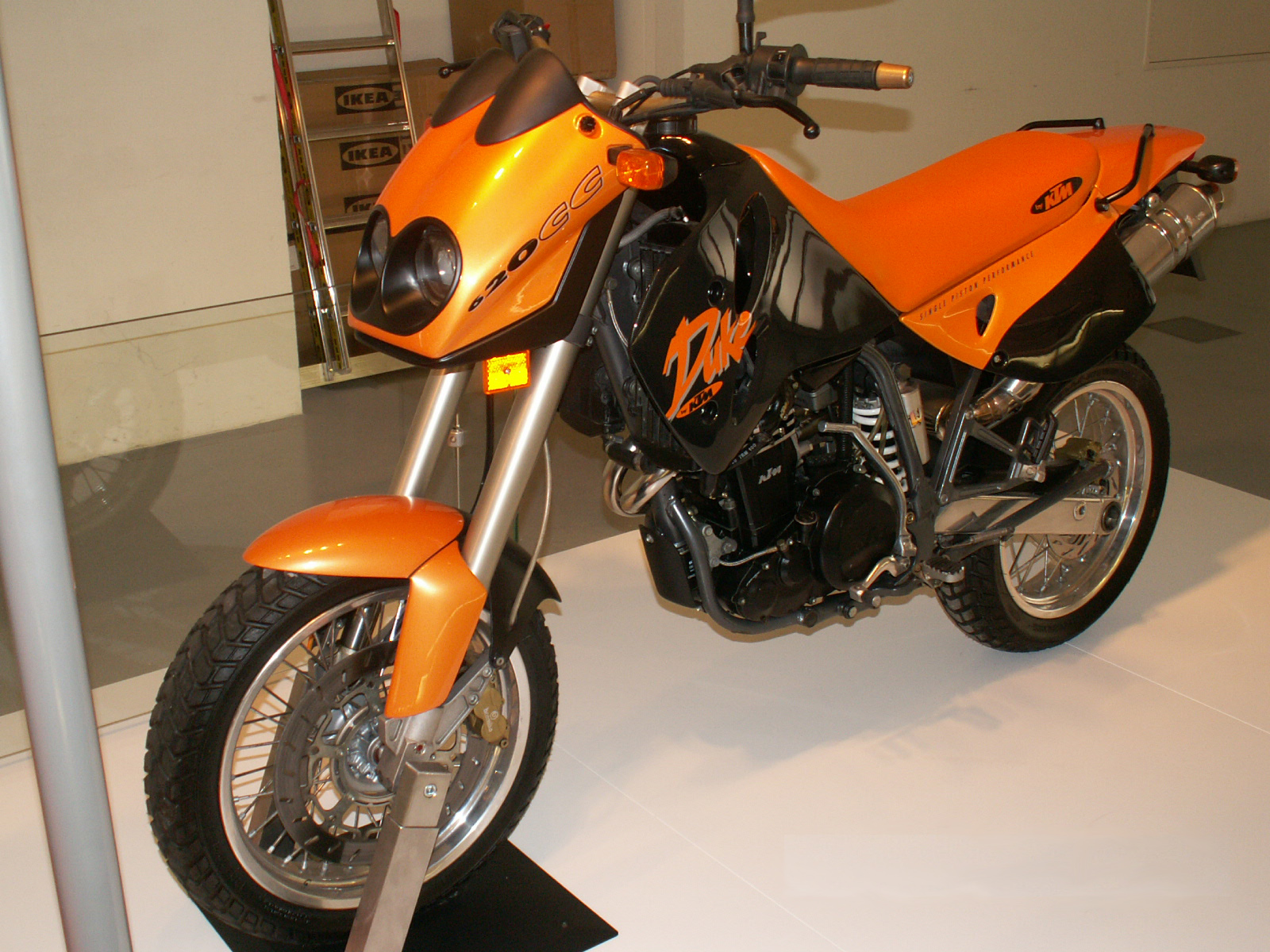
KTM Duke 620 – KTM's first stock supermoto bike

The first KTM street bike was the 1994 Duke 620.

Standard/Naked – With the Duke and Superduke models, KTM currently offers naked bikes with 250, 390, 990 and 1390 cc displacement. The 125 (not available in the US), 250 and 390 models have a single-cylinder four-stroke LC4 motor. The 990 Duke use a new twin-parallel engine. The 1390 R Superduke model is equipped with a 75 degree V-twin four-stroke motor (LC8).

The 200, 250 and 390 Duke models are currently produced by Bajaj Auto in Pune, India. The 250 is only available in Asia, with only the Duke 390 and Duke 200 being exported to European countries and North America.

Dual Sport – KTM currently produces two category of dual sports bikes all of which are 4T. The 350 EXC-F and the 500 EXC-F are derived from their "Enduro" platform utilizing longer travel, PDS suspension and wide ratio gearboxes. They are very off-road biased and can be considered street legal dirt bikes.

The 390 Enduro R and 690 Enduro R are derived from their "Duke" road bike platform and are basically road bikes suitable for off-road excursions. Like their 'Adventure touring" siblings these bikes typically have lower seat heights and more comfort features than a "street legal" off-road bike.

Adventure touring – KTM currently produces the 390 Adventure, 890 Adventure R, and 1290 Super Adventure dual-sport adventure bikes in versions with different seat height, wheels and suspensions that endow the machines with a road (S), off-road (R – for rally) or touring (T) bias. Not all versions are available on the US market.

The 1090 Adventure and 1290 Super Adventure bikes are powered by 75 degree V-twin four-stroke motors (LC8). The 790 Adventure is powered by the new LC8c parallel twin four-stroke motor. All 3 feature a slipper clutch, electronically controlled riding modes (sport, street and rain) with the 1290 and 790 featuring a TFT display and the 1090 featuring a twin (analog plus LCD) display.

Sport – KTM sport bikes currently offered in the supersport category include the RC 125 (not available in the US) and the RC 390. Both are street-legal versions of bikes that compete in street races. With the RC16, KTM has presented a 1000 cc sport bike that will race in the MotoGP class of the 2017 Road Racing World Championship Grand Prix. Whether there will be a street-legal production version of the RC16 at a later point in time is yet unclear.

In Asia, KTM also markets RC 200 and RC 250 street bikes. KTM is also planning to introduce a new 150cc bike in its RC lineup in the Asian countries. This would be the KTC RC 150, that will powered by a 149cc, single-cylinder engine and 6-speed gearbox. This will be launched at a more affordable price, so everyone can opt for it.

Sports Touring – The KTM sports tourer 1290 Superduke GT (Gran Turismo) is a version of the 1290 Superduke R naked bike that has been modified for more touring comfort with a longer and more robust frame, modified handlebar, larger fuel tank and modified 75 degree V-twin four-stroke LC8 motor. Like the 1290 Super Adventure, the 1290 Superduke GT features three electronically controlled riding modes.

Supermoto – KTM was the first manufacturer to offer a competition-ready supermoto bike to the public. However, the company stopped supermoto production in 2016 to focus on stock 690 SMC R machines. For the 2019 Model year, the 690 SMC R model was completely renewed. The bike now has the latest version of the single cylinder LC4 power unit, introduced for the MY2016 Duke. The previous supermoto models included the 625 SMC and the race version 560 SMR. The 141 kg light 690 SMC R model has a 48 kW liquid-cooled one-cylinder four-stroke motor (LC4) and a hydraulically actuated APTC slipper clutch.

KTM Motorcycles Models List
Category	Model	Engine Type	Engine Designation	Status	Picture
Motocross	SX	2-Stroke	50cc; 65cc; 85cc; 125cc; 250cc; 300cc	In Production	450 SX-F
Motocross	SX-F	4-Stroke	250cc; 350cc; 450cc	In Production	450 SX-F
Motocross	SX-E	Electric	1.8KW; 3.8KW; 5.0 KW	In Production	450 SX-F
Freeride	E-XC	Electric	18KW	In Production	Freeride E-XC
Cross Country	XC	2-Stroke	250cc; 300cc	In Production	
Cross Country	XC-F	4-Stroke	250cc; 350cc; 450cc	In Production	
Enduro	EXC	2-Stroke	125cc; 150cc; 250cc; 300cc	In Production	300 XC-W
Enduro	XC-W	2-Stroke	150cc; 250cc; 300cc	In Production	300 XC-W
Enduro	XCF-W	4-Stroke	450cc	In Production	300 XC-W
Dual Sport	EXC-F	4-Stroke	350cc; 500cc	In Production	690 Enduro
Dual Sport	Enduro R	4-Stroke	125cc; 390cc; 690cc	In Production	690 Enduro
Adventure	Adventure	4-Stroke; LC4c: Single	390cc	In Production	KTM 390 Adventure R
Adventure	Adventure Rally	4-Stroke; LC8c: Twin	890cc	In Production	KTM 390 Adventure R
Adventure	Super Adventure	4-Stroke; LC8: V-twin	1290cc; 1390cc	In Production	KTM 390 Adventure R
Sports Tourer	Super Duke GT	4-Stroke	1290cc	In Production	1290 Super Duke GT
Sports Tourer	SMT	4-Stroke	890cc	In Production	1290 Super Duke GT
Supermoto	SMR	4-Stroke	450cc	In Production	450 SMR
Supermoto	SMC R	4-Stroke	125cc; 390cc; 690cc	In Production	450 SMR
Naked	Duke	4-Stroke; LC4c: Single; LC8c: Twin	250cc; 390cc; 790cc; 990cc	In Production	Duke 790
Naked	Super Duke	4-Stroke; LC8: V-twin	1390cc	In Production	Duke 790
Naked	Brabus	4-Stroke; LC8: V-twin	1400cc	In Production	Duke 790
Supersport	RC	4-Stroke	125cc; 390cc	In Production	RC R 990
Supersport	RC 8C	4-Stroke; LC8c: Twin	890cc	In Production	RC R 990
Supersport	RC R	4-Stroke; LC8c: Twin	990cc	In Production	RC R 990

=== X-Bow ===
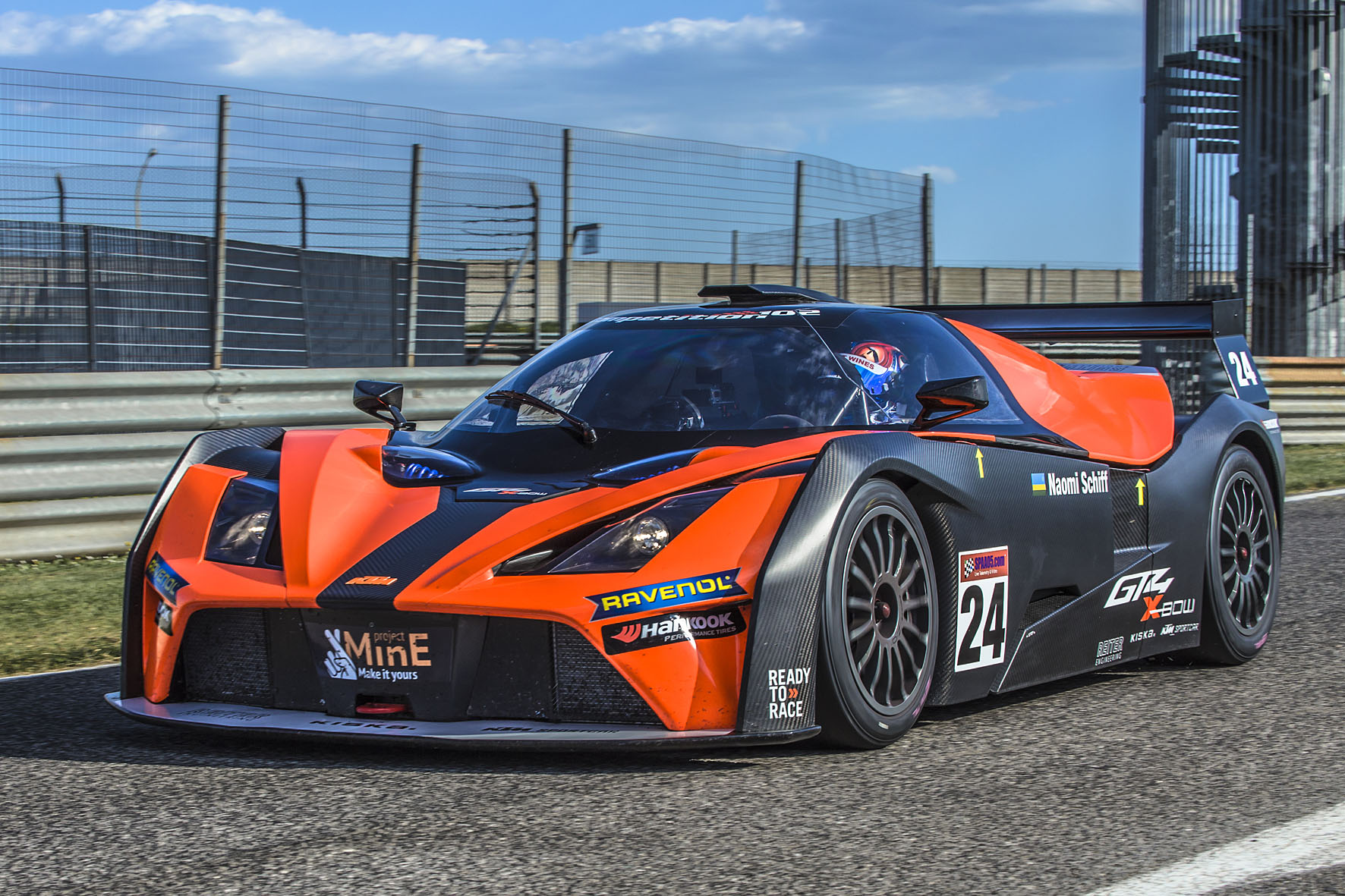
KTM X-Bow GT4

The KTM X-Bow (pronounced cross-bow) is a series of lightweight, two-seater sports cars known as the X-Bow R, the X-Bow RR, the X-Bow GT and the X-BOW GT4. The R and GT versions of the X-Bow are street-legal in Europe, North America, China and Australia. It uses an Audi engine and a carbon fibre chassis developed in cooperation with Italian racing car manufacturer Dallara, making it the world's first street-legal car with a full carbon fibre monocoque.

=== Discontinued ===
KTM retired from superbike production and competitions. From 2008 to 2015, the company produced the 1190 RC8 superbike, a light, powerful homologated (street-legal) bike for superbike competitions with an LC8 motor and without any of the electronic driving aids that the otherwise comparable Superduke and Super Adventure models offer.

KTM has ceased production of 450SX, 450XC, 505SX and 525XC All-terrain vehicles.

In 2016 KTM retired the production of the KTM 200 series.

=== Two-stroke development ===
In the 1990s, AMA rule changes put the cheaper, simpler two-stroke machines at a disadvantage to four-stroke bikes in motocross competitions by limiting two-stroke displacement at 125 cc for the 250 cc class and 250 cc for the 450 cc class. While other manufacturers have decided to discontinue their two-stroke models, KTM has continued with creating and improving their two-stroke engines and has consequently taken up a very high proportion of the two-stroke bike market.

New European emission laws have increased the pressure on two-stroke bikes, as their engines are less fuel efficient and produce more pollution than four-stroke engines. However, with newer advances in technology, two-strokes have begun to burn cleaner and pass stricter environmental standards. Starting in 2017, all newly registered motorcycles must conform with the Euro 4 regulations for emissions management. In May 2017, KTM unveiled a new two-stroke engine with direct fuel injection. By pressure-injecting an electronically controlled amount of fuel into the transfer port of the cylinder, the new TPI (transfer port injection) engines will be more fuel efficient and cleaner than classic carburetor two-stroke engines, albeit more complex and expensive. By 2018, 250 and 300 EXC TPI enduro models will be powered by the new engine.

=== Design ===
Since 2016, KTM motorcycles have been designed by KISKA GmbH, a Salzburg-based design firm. KISKA also designed four versions of the X-Bow and is responsible for the overall branding for KTM and Husqvarna.

=== Parts and Wear ===
Under the Powerparts label, KTM sells tuning and styling parts for its street and off-road motorcycles and the X-Bow. The Powerwear label offers race gear and equipment, clothing, accessories and merchandise articles.
