= KTM LC8 engine =

The KTM LC8 engine is a group of motorcycle engines developed by KTM. They are the original LC8 75º V-twin and the LC8c parallel twin. The parallel twin uses a 285° crankshaft angle in order to mimic the 75° V-twin. The nomenclature indicates design elements of the engines. LC8 signifies Liquid Cooling 8-valve while LC8c signifies Liquid Cooling 8-valve, compact. KTM and CFMOTO oversee the global production of the LC8c in Hangzhou, China.

== LC8 V-twin ==
The concept for a KTM V-twin engine began in 1992 when two engineering students put together a pair of cylinders from a LC4 single on a special crankcase for display at the IFMA Show in Cologne. Then in 1996 KTM commissioned the Stuttgart-based design office Kraft Technik to produce a design for a motorcycle V-twin. The 60-degree V-twin RSV900 Rotax and the Swedish engine manufacturer Folan's 948cc 60-degree V-twin engines were both considered. Early in 1998 a new V-twin became a priority. KTM chief engineer Wolfgang Felber studied twin-cylinder engine concepts and by August 1998, the design team settled on a 75-degree V-twin. KTM assumed the entire R&D process in-house, and hired Claus Holweg as Project Manager from their Austrian neighbors Rotax. By August 11, 1999, the new 942cc LC8 engine had its first dyno run.

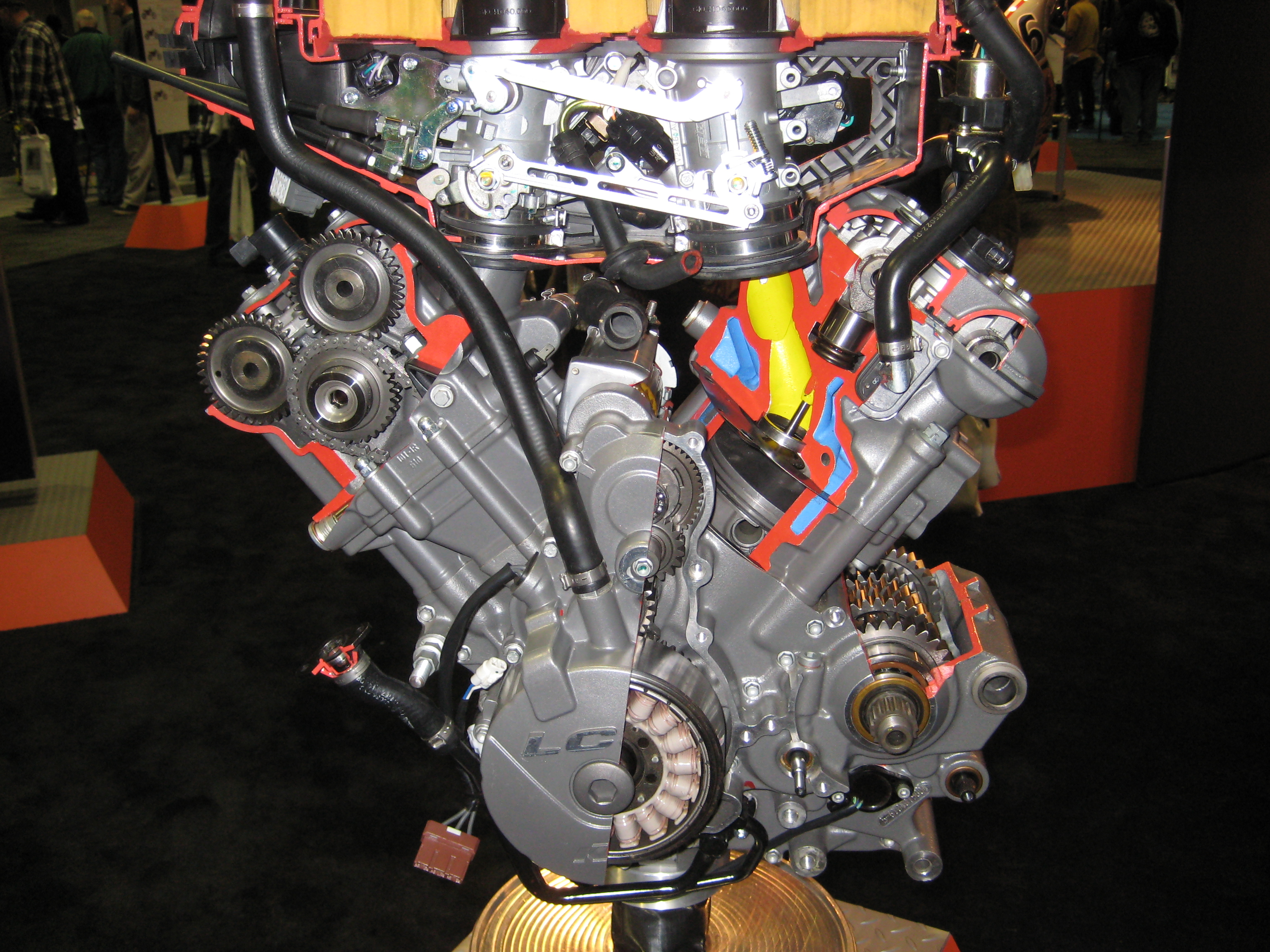
KTM LC8 engine

KTM starts production of the carbureted, 4 valve/cylinder, DOHC 950 LC8 in 2003. The motor produces 102 hp @ 8,000 rpm and 71.5 ft⋅lbs torque @ 6,000 rpm with a bore and stroke of 100 mm × 60 mm.

2006 KTM delivers the 999cc electronic fuel injected 990 LC8 engine. The motor produces 105 hp @ 8,250 rpm and has a bore and stroke of 101 mm × 62.4 mm.

In 2013 1290 LC8 arrived with an 1195cc power plant.

The 2024 1390 LC8 delivers 190 hp and 107 ft⋅lbs torque from the 1350cc electronically controlled, twin spark ignition, and titanium inlet valve V-twin.

== LC8c parallel twin ==
The 2017 790 LC8c's 799 cc liquid cooled eight-valve DOHC engine produces power of 95 hp and torque of 64.9 ft⋅lbs with a bore and stroke of 88 mm × 65.7 mm.

The 890 LC8c was updated in 2020 to 889cc with 105 hp and torque of 73.8 ft⋅lbs. with a bore and stroke of 90.7 mm × 65.7 mm.

In 2024 new 947cc, 990 LC8c engines appeares with 123 hp @ 9,500 rpm and 76 ft⋅lbs torque at 6,750 rpm and has a bore and stroke of 92.5 mm × 70.4 mm.

=== LC8c cam issues ===
Owners of LC8c equipped bikes are reporting issues surrounding loss of power and engine noise. Analysis by independent researchers allege that camshaft lobes and finger followers exhibit excessive wear due to inadequate hardness.

KTM found that the core issue was not the camshaft itself, but the rocker arms. These were designed too narrowly in earlier models, leading to increased wear. Starting in 2021, a wider version of the rocker arms was introduced and a new DLC coating (Diamond-Like Carbon) was applied to better protect the components from wear.
