= KTM Duke series =

KTM Duke Series
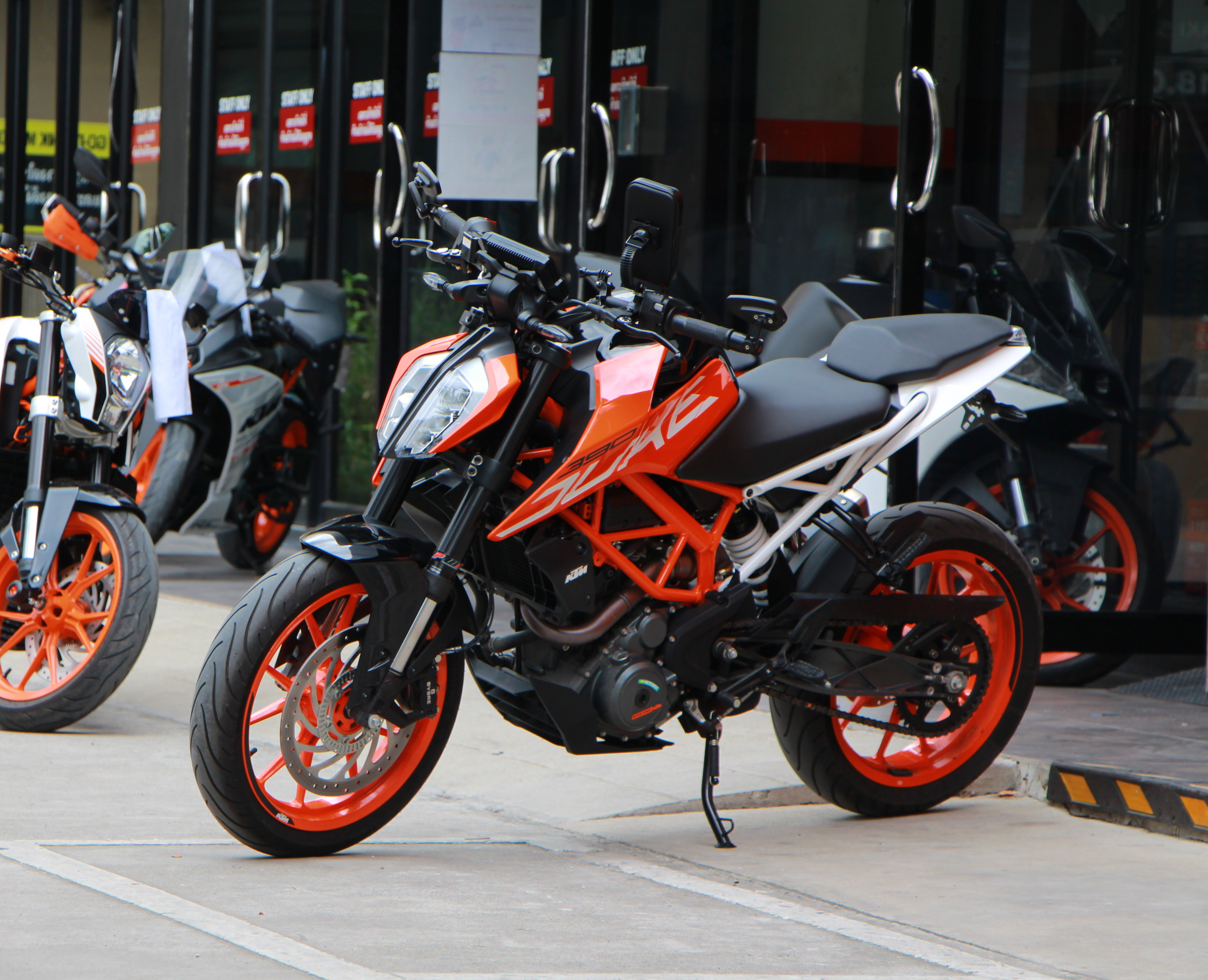
- 2018 390 Duke
- Manufacturer: KTM; Bajaj Auto
- Production: 125 Duke (2010–present); 200 Duke (2012–present); 250 Duke (2012–present); 390 Duke (2013–present); 690 Duke (1994—2018); Duke 620 (1994–1997); Duke 640 (1998–2007); Duke 690 (2008—2018); 790 Duke (2017–2020, 2023—present); 890 Duke (2020–2023); 990 Duke (2024—present); 990 Super Duke (2004–2012); 1290 Super Duke R (2013–2023); 1290 Super Duke GT (2016–present); 1390 Super Duke R (2024—present)
- Assembly: Austria; India
- Transmission: 6-speed, chain drive, slipper clutch

The KTM Duke series is a family of standard motorcycles manufactured by KTM and Bajaj Auto Limited since from 1994. The Duke was KTM's first street bike, and first supermoto, having previously made only off-road and racing motorcycles.

== History ==
In 1998 KTM introduced the 640 Supermoto, so the Duke line became a more street oriented standard or streetfighter, while retaining some off-road characteristics like a relatively long suspension travel. Initially the Duke was KTM's entry level street bike, but later KTM partnered with Bajaj Auto to produce the 125 Duke, 200 Duke, and 390 Duke in India, placing the 600 cc class Dukes in the middle of their range. In 2005, KTM introduced the Super Duke to expand the range above the middle Duke, initially 999 cc (61.0 cu in) and later growing to 1,301 cc (79.4 cu in).

== Duke series ==
=== Single-cylinder ===
- 125 Duke (2010–present)
- 200 Duke (2012–present)
- 250 Duke (2012–present)
- 350 Duke (tbd)
- 390 Duke (2013–present)
- 690 Duke (1994–2018)
  - Duke 620 (1994–1997)
  - Duke 640 (1998–2007)
  - Duke 690 (2008–2018)

=== Parallel-twin ===
Parallel twin LC8c engine

- 790 Duke (2017–2020, reintroduced 2023)
- 890 Duke (2020–2023)
- 990 Duke (2024–present)

== Super Duke series ==
=== V-twin ===
75-degree V-twin LC8 engine

- 990 Super Duke (2004–2012)
- 1290 Super Duke R (2013–2023)
  - 1290 Super Duke GT (2016–present)
- 1390 Super Duke R (2024–present)
  - 1390 Super Duke GT (Delayed until 2027)

== Gallery ==
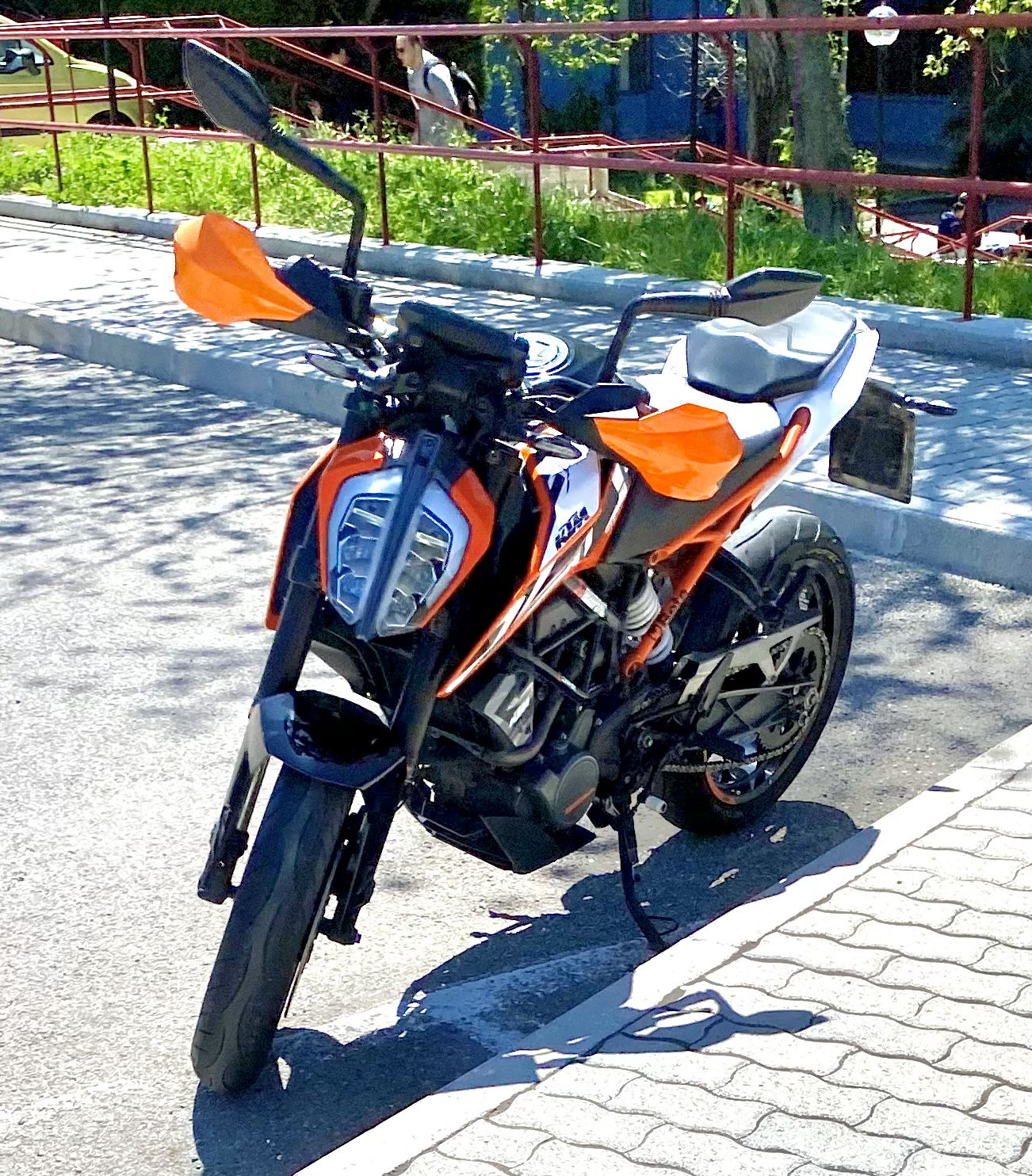
125 Duke

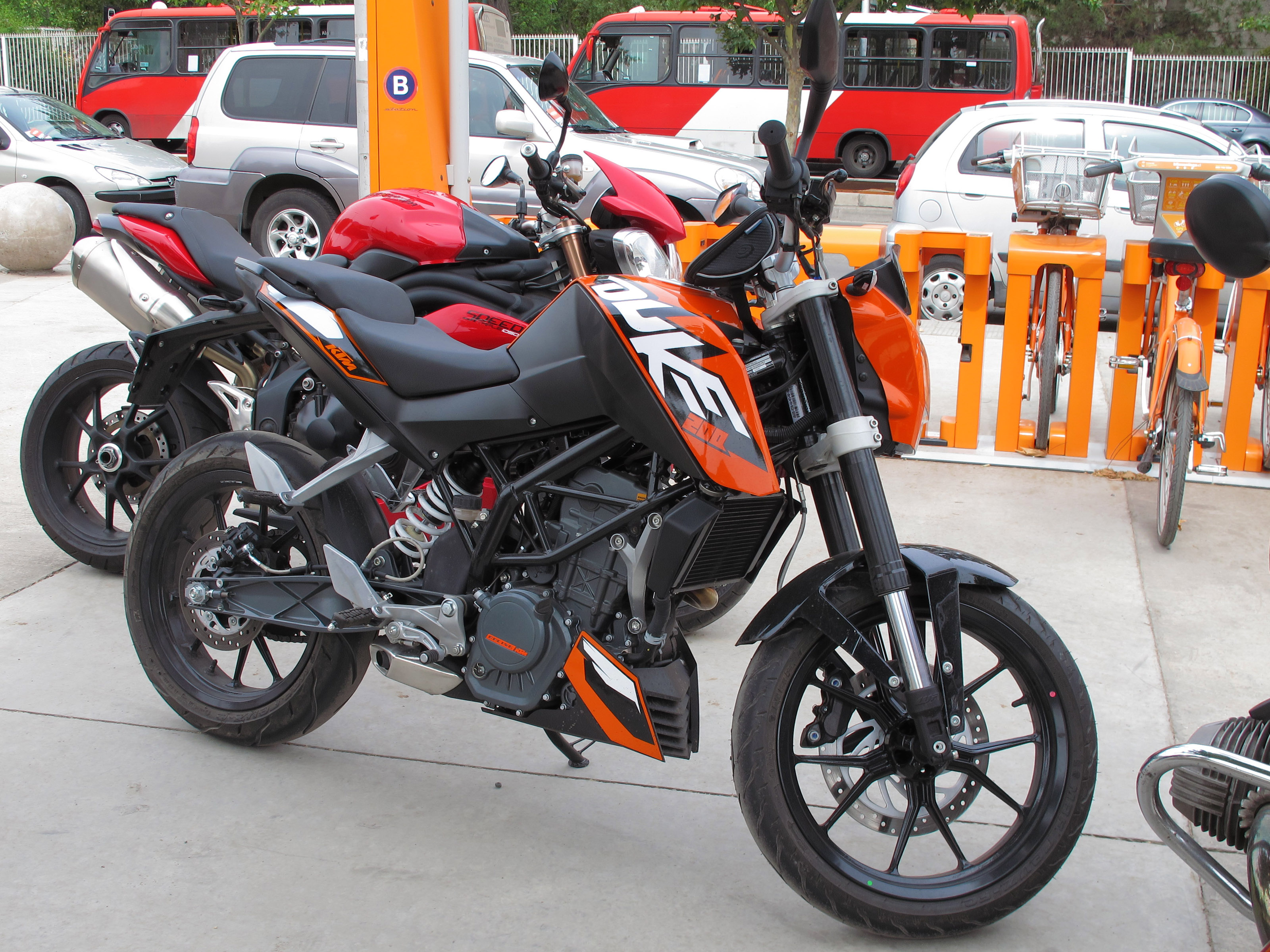
200 Duke

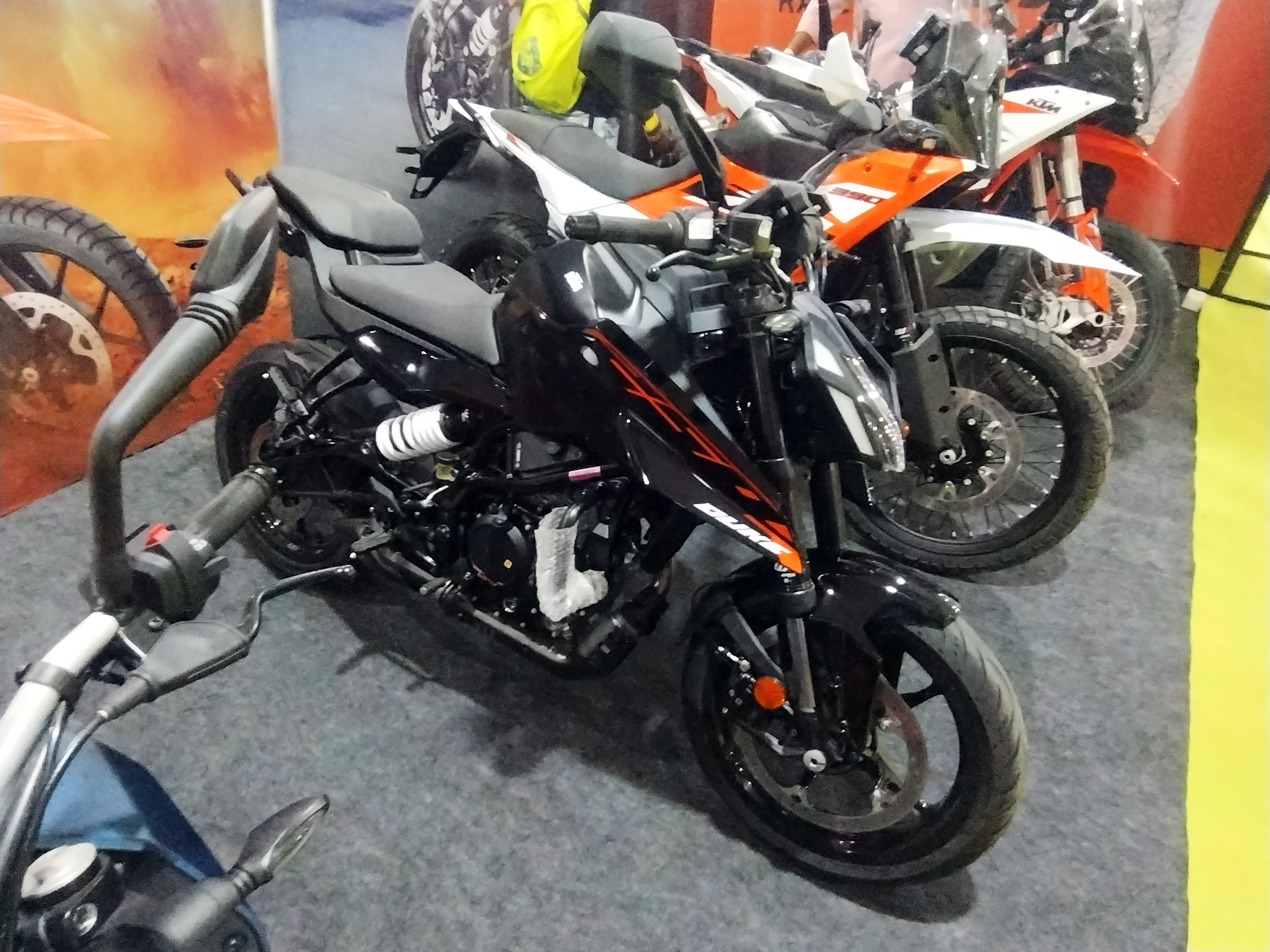
250 Duke

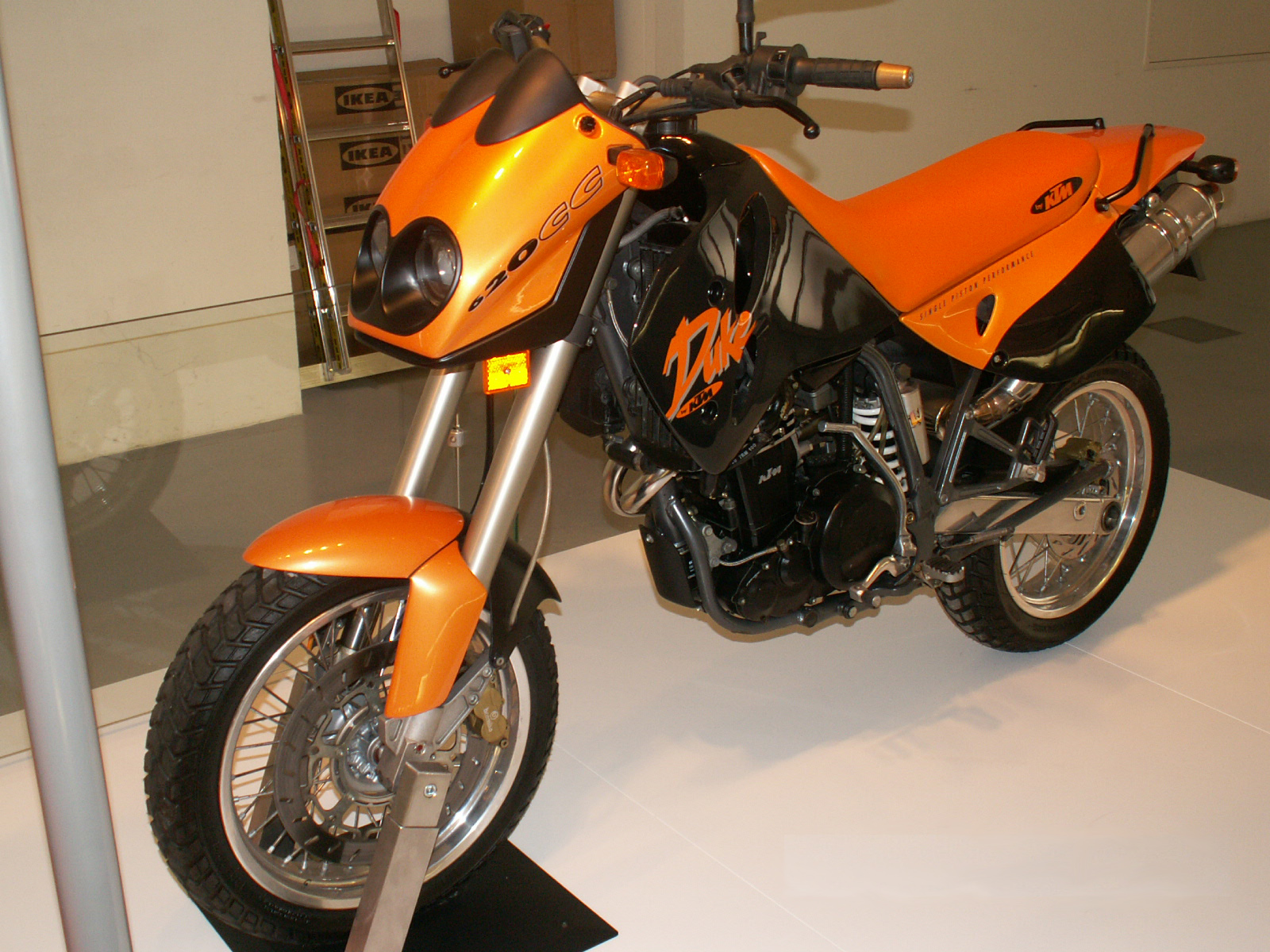
Duke 620 I 1994–1997

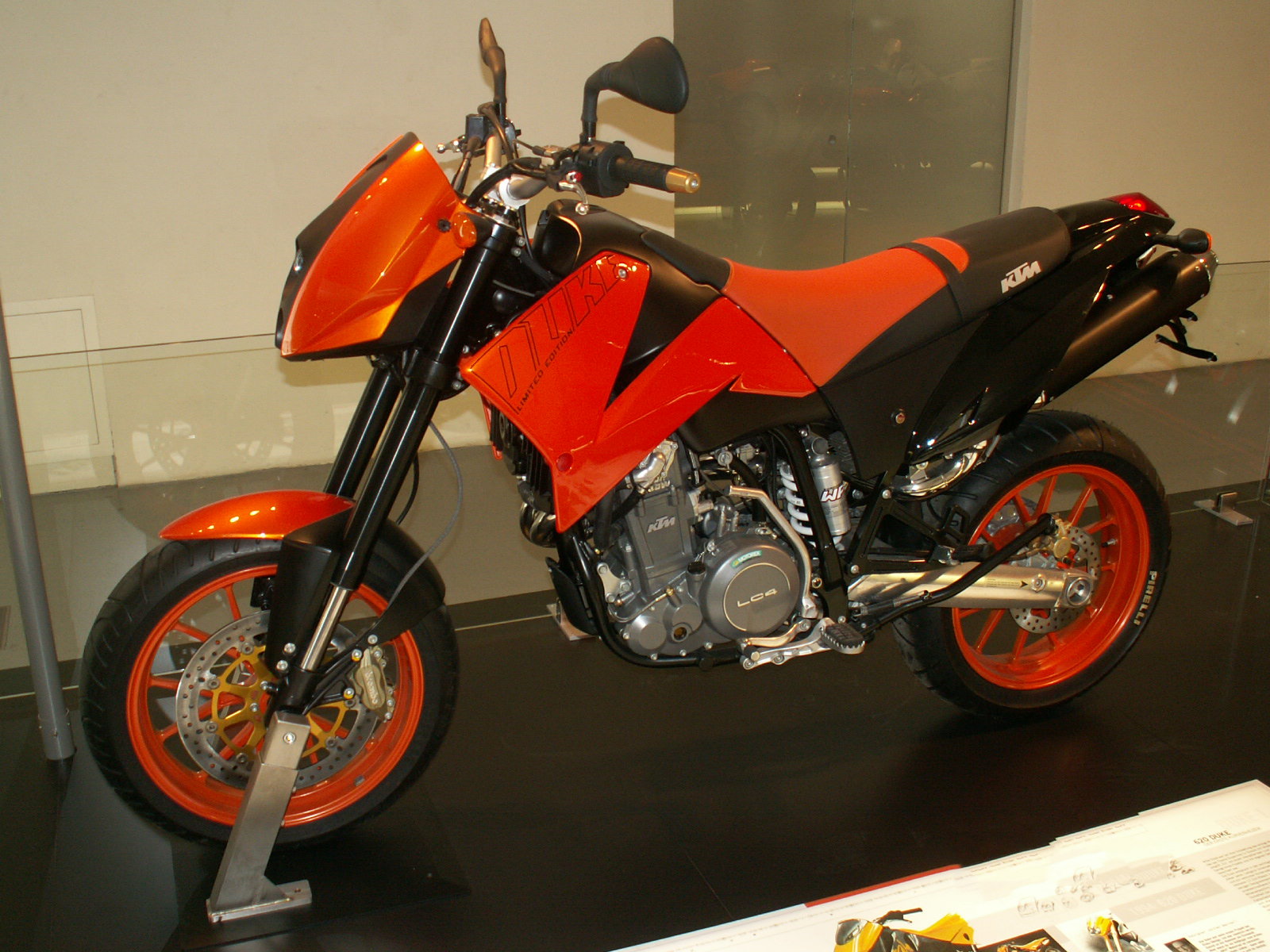
Duke 640 II 1998–2007

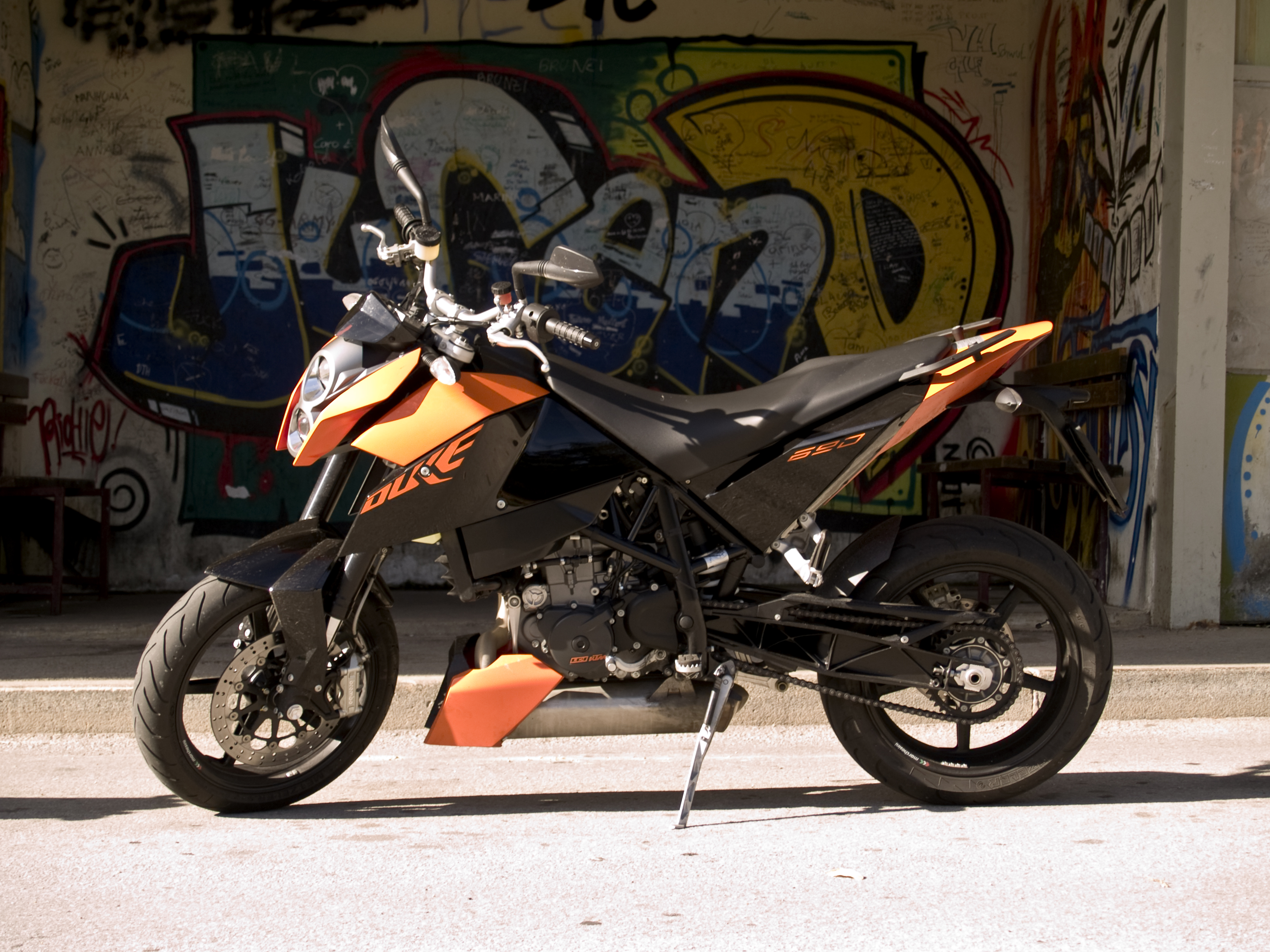
KTM 690 Duke III 2008–2011

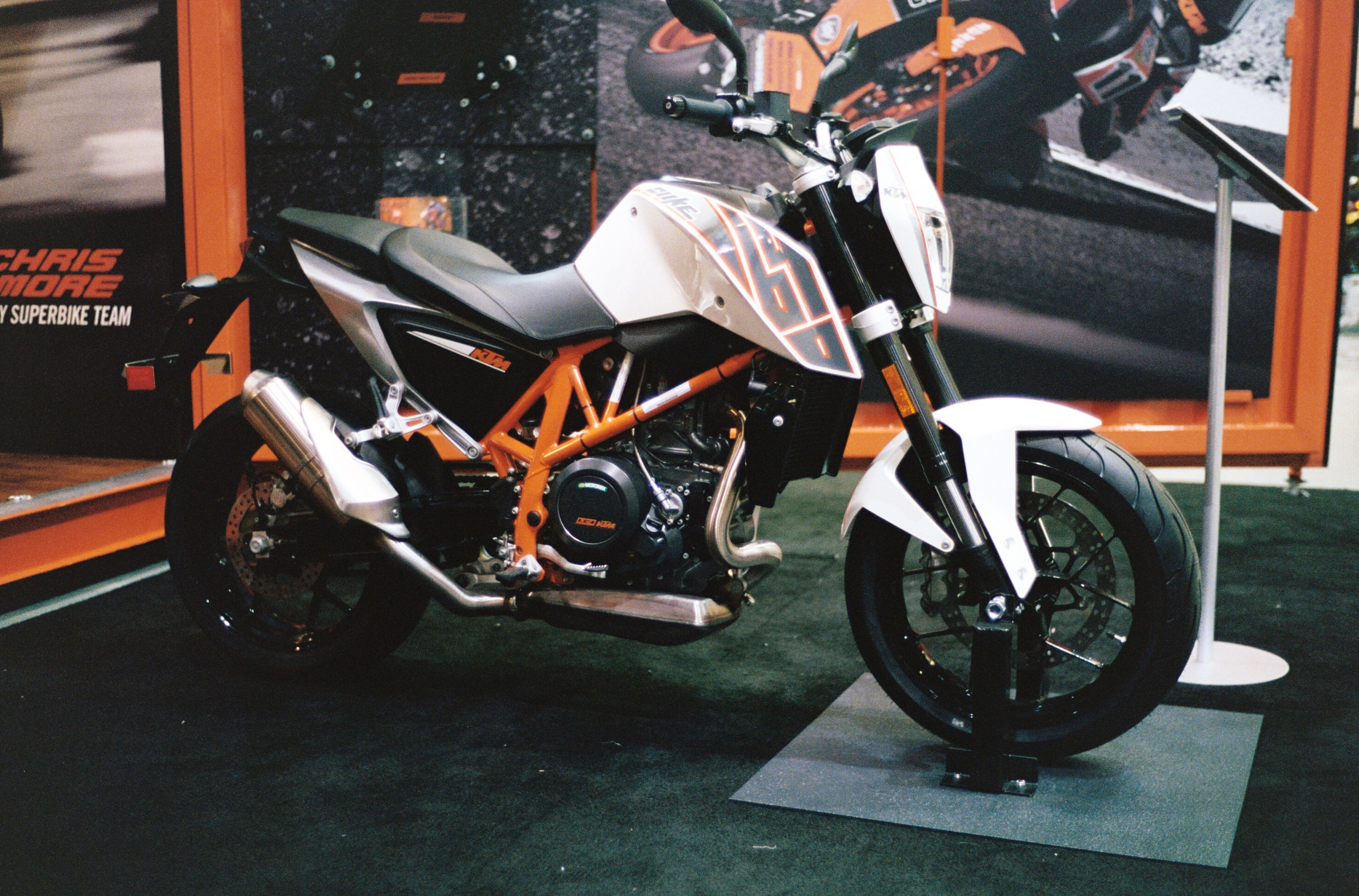
690 Duke IV 2012-2015

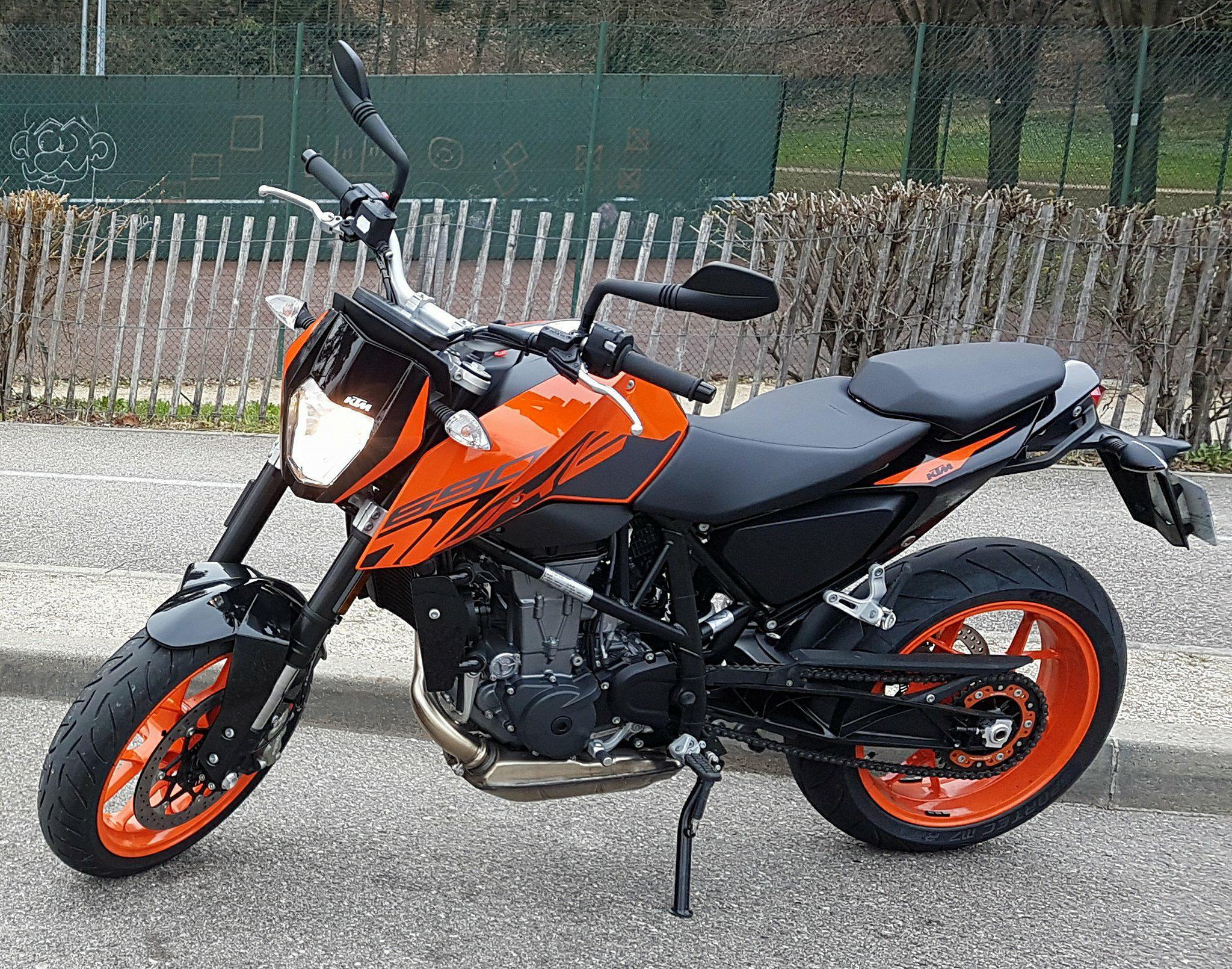
2018 Duke 690 R

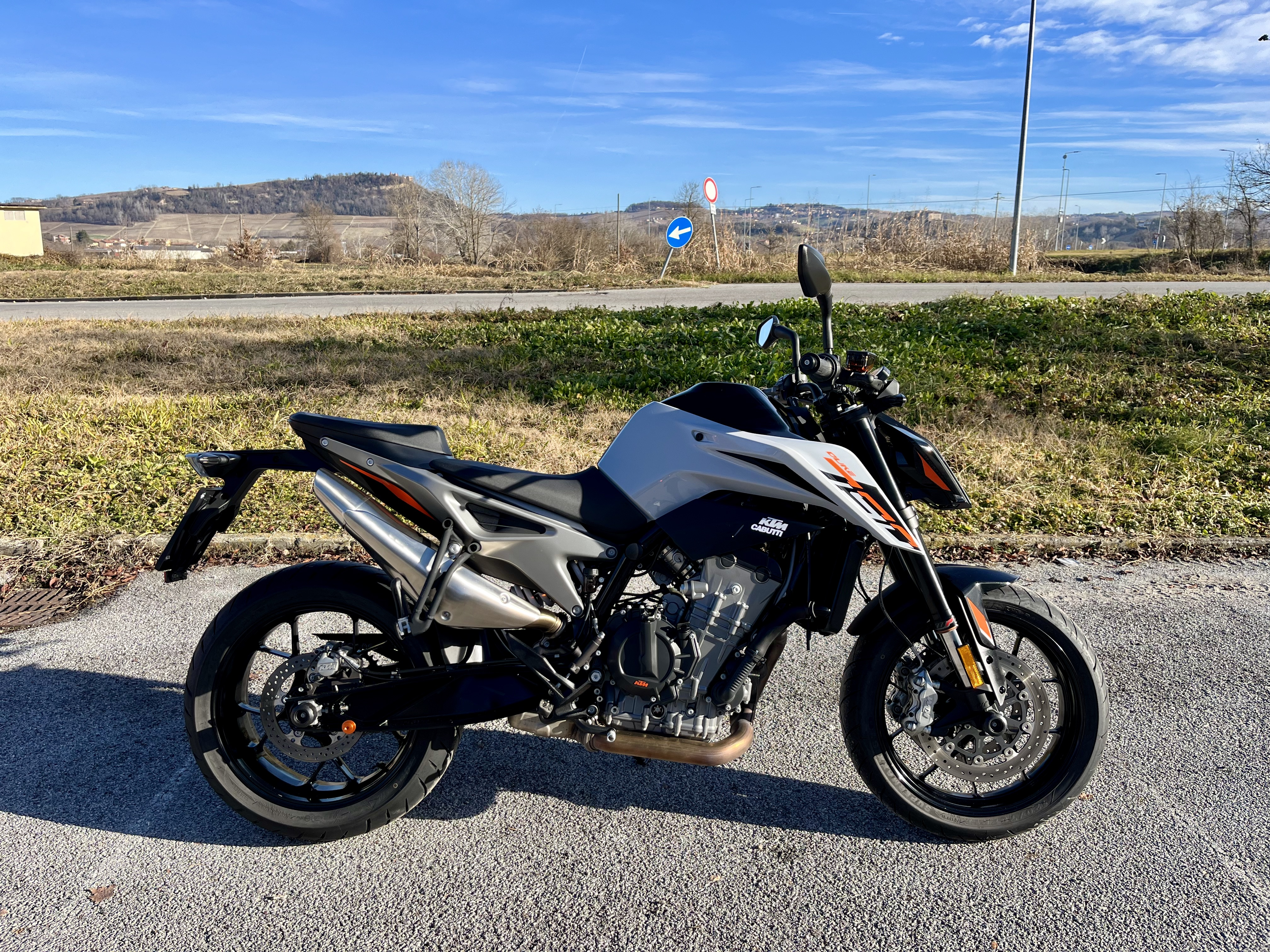
790 Duke

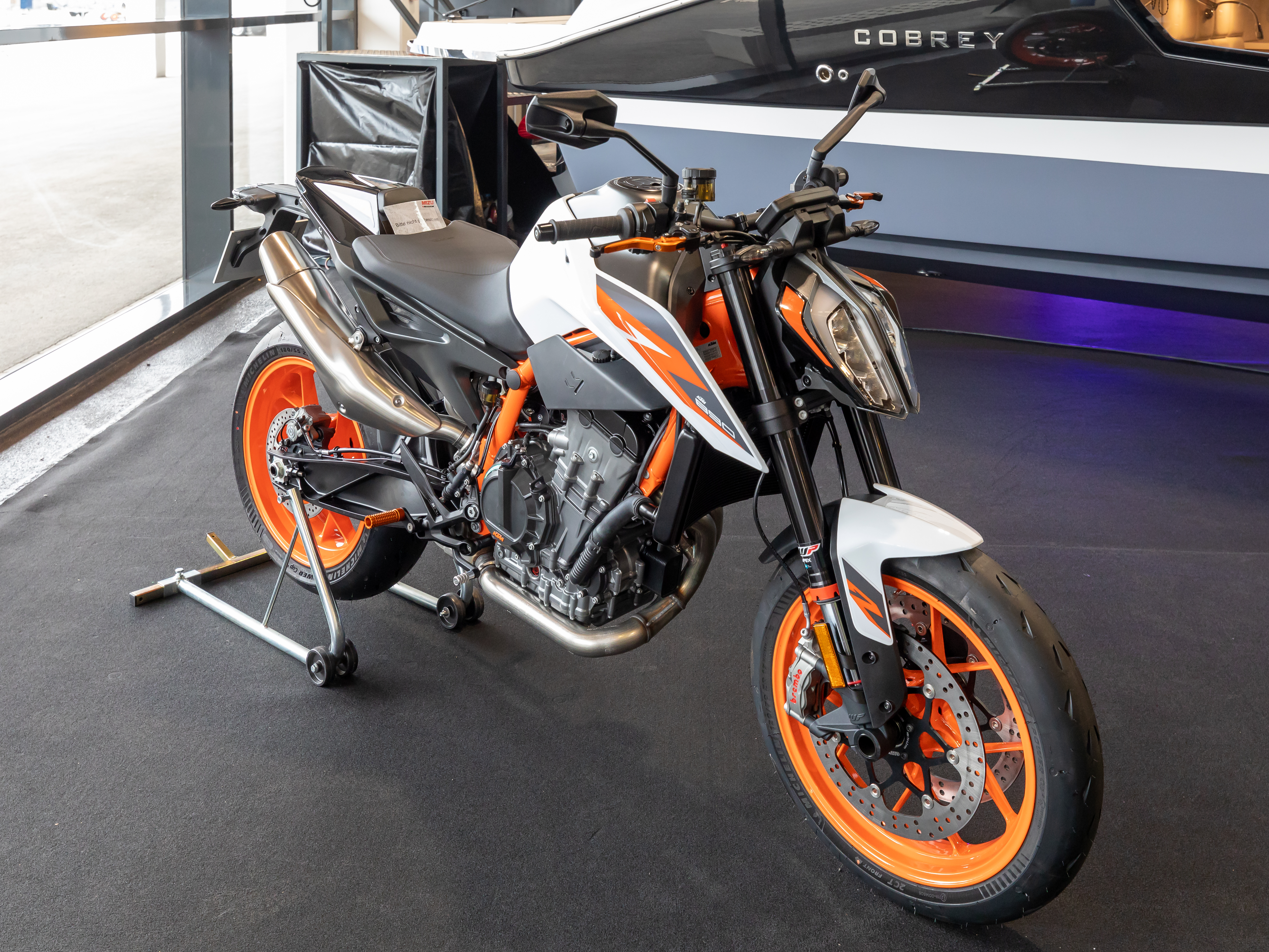
890 Duke R

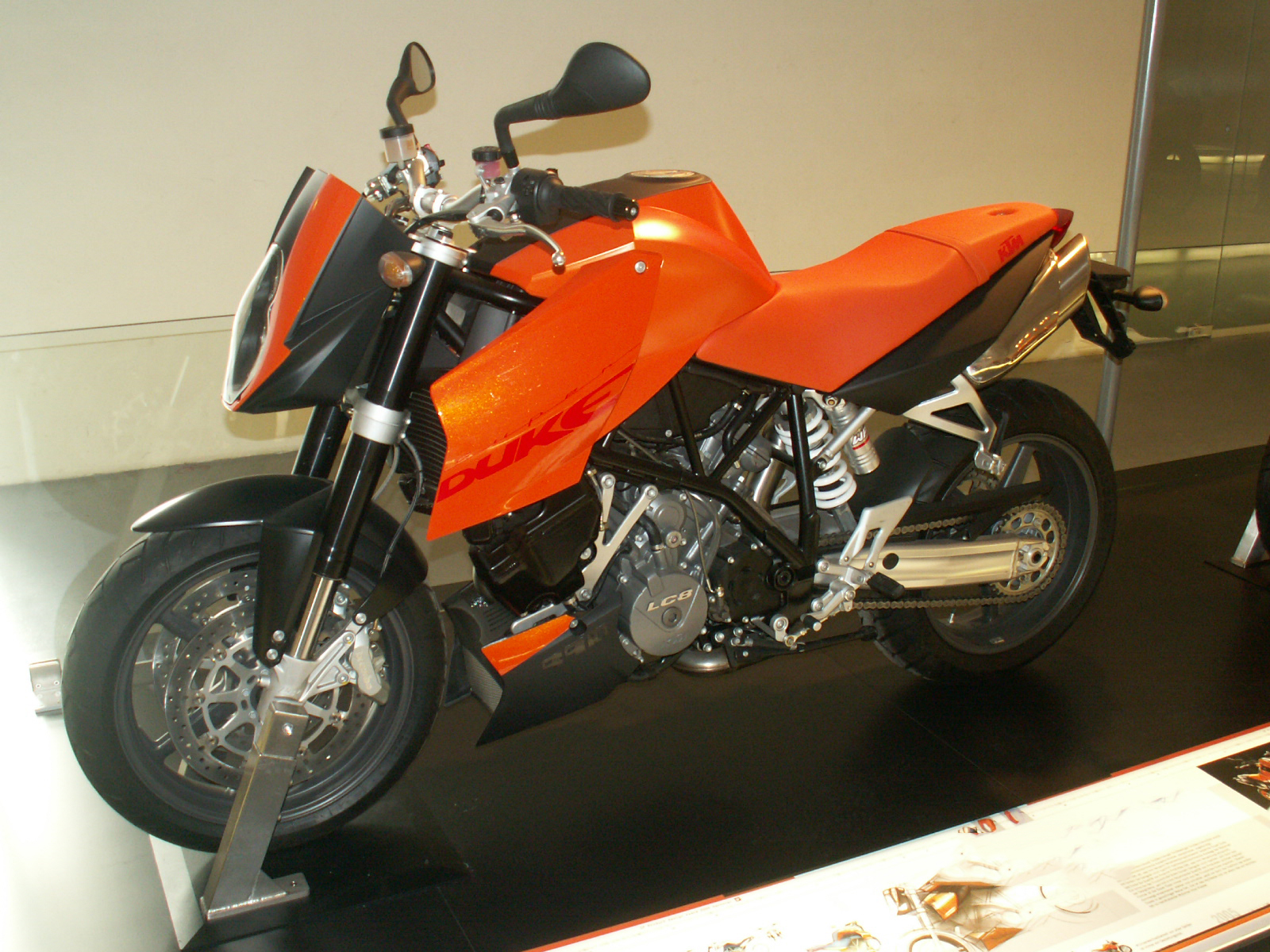
990 Super Duke

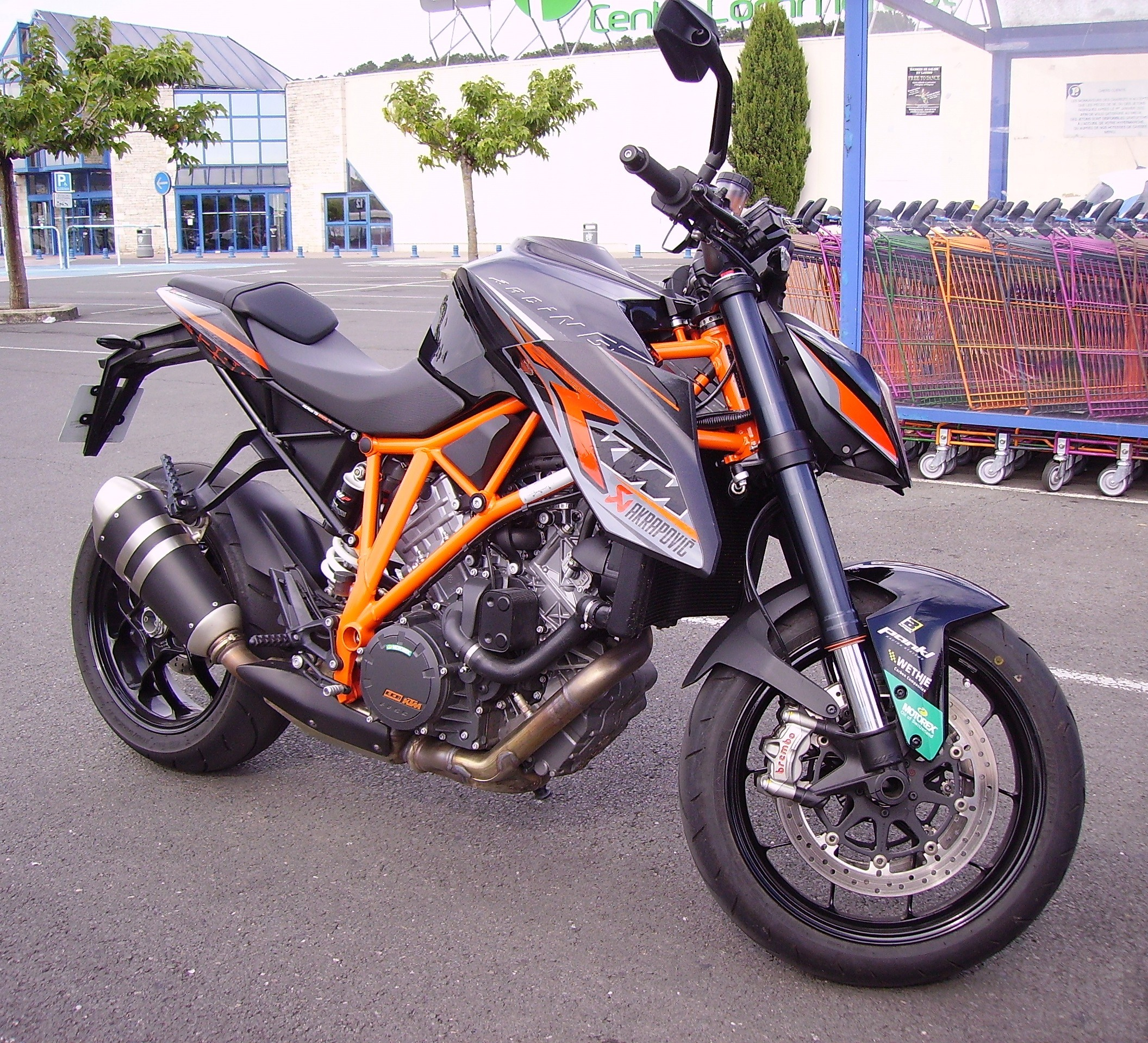
1290 Super Duke R

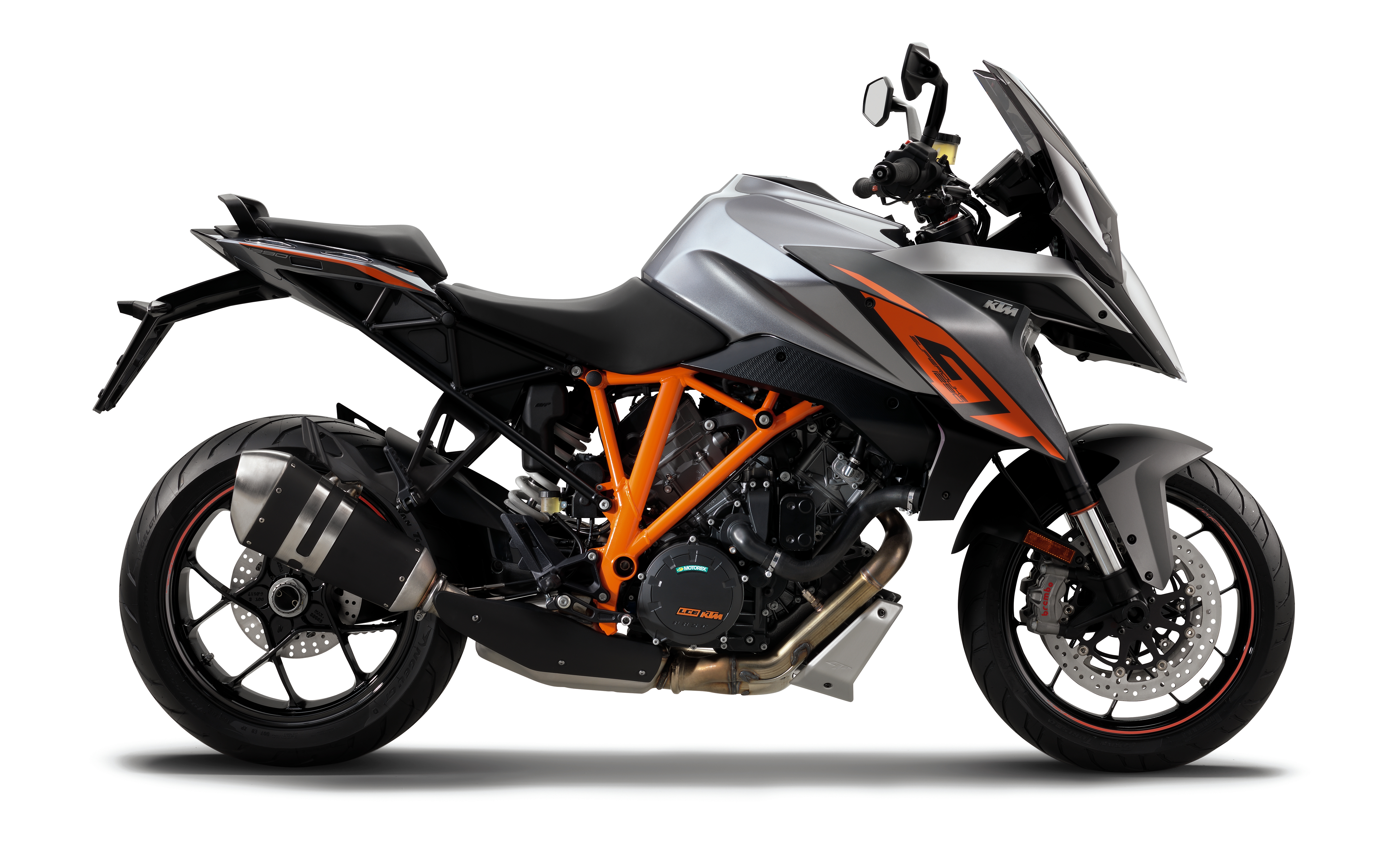
1290 Super Duke GT
