= KTM 65 SX =

Youth motorcycle made by KTM

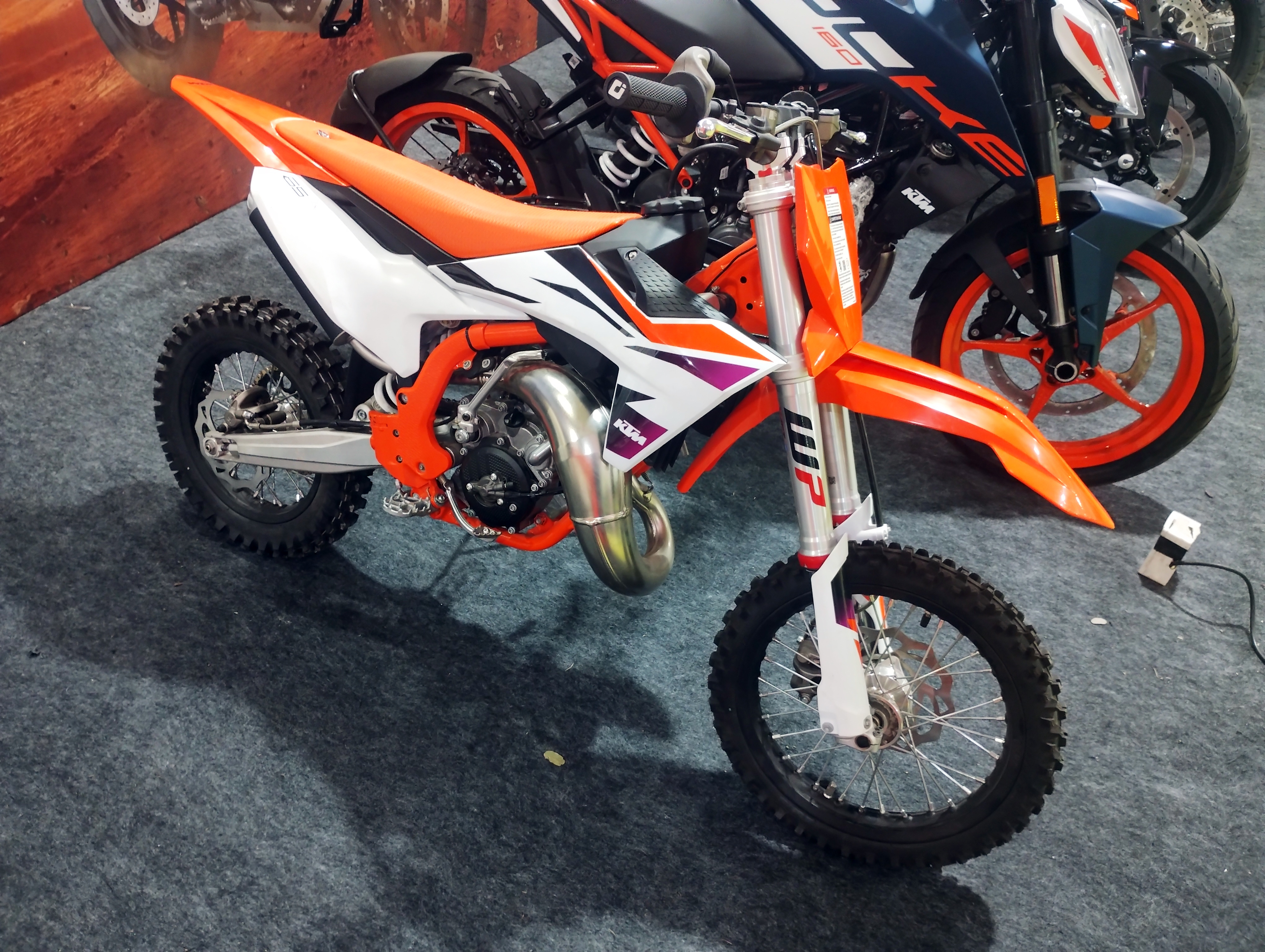
- Manufacturer: KTM
- Class: Motocross
- Ignition type: AET digital
- Fuel delivery: Mikuni VM 24-505
- Transmission: 6 gears
- Frame type: Double grinded central double-cradle-type frame
- Brakes: Front: Disc brake 198 mm (7.80"); Rear: Disc brake 160 mm (6.3")
- Wheelbase: 1137 mm (44.76")
- Seat height: 750 mm (28.54")
- Weight: 53 kg (116.8 lbs) (dry); 55.4 kg (122.13 lbs) (wet)
- Fuel capacity: 3.5 liters (0.93 gal)
- Ground clearance: 280 mm (11.02")

The KTM 65 SX is a youth motorcycle made by KTM. The factory introduced the motorcycle in 1998, and it is still available. It has a 64 cc single-cylinder two-stroke water-cooled engine, a six-speed manual gearbox and 53 kg dry weight.

== Model progression ==
=== 2010 ===
New ignition cover (improved sealing) and new engine case (improved reliability).

=== 65 SXS Factory Racing version ===
KTM introduced the very limited edition SXS version. This version increases horsepower from 16 to 19.5, and includes FMF exhaust, a holeshot device, an aluminum ignition cover, and a tuned carburetor.
