= KTM 1290 Super Adventure =

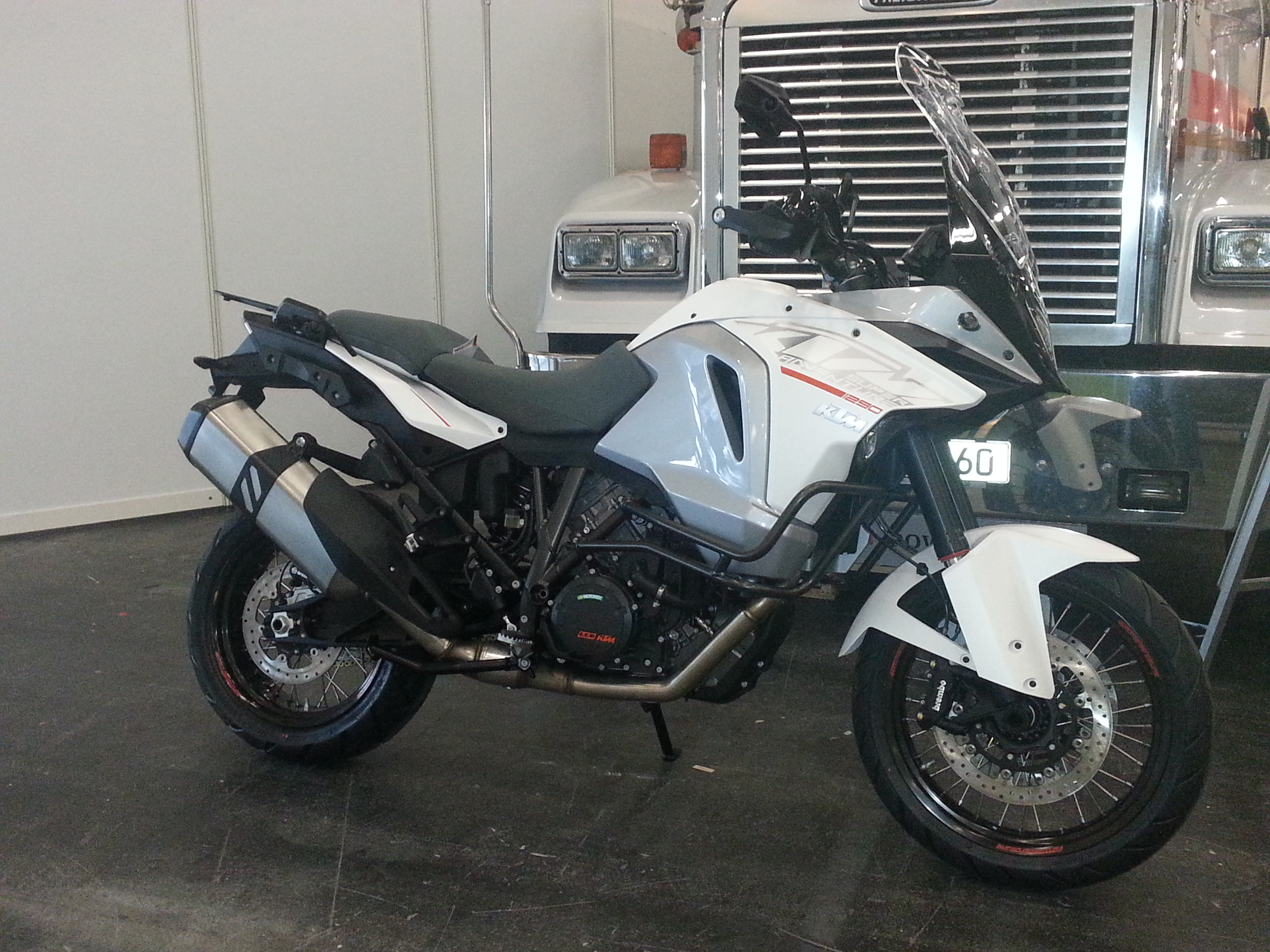
- KTM 1290 Super Adventure
- Manufacturer: KTM
- Production: 2015–
- Predecessor: KTM 1190 Adventure
- Successor: KTM 1390 Super Adventure
- Class: Adventure touring
- Engine: 1301 cc, 8-valve, 75° V-twin
- Bore / stroke: 108 mm × 71 mm (4.25 in × 2.80 in)
- Power: 160 hp (120 kW)
- Torque: 138 N⋅m (102 lbf⋅ft)
- Transmission: 6-speed, wet clutch, chain drive
- Frame type: Steel tube trellis
- Suspension: Front: 48 mm WP semi-active fork Rear: WP semi-active shock
- Brakes: Front: Dual 320 mm disc; Brembo 4-pot caliper Rear: Single 267 mm disc; 2-pot caliper Semi-linked ABS
- Weight: 504 lb (229 kg) (claimed) (dry)
- Fuel capacity: 7.9 US gal (30 L)

The KTM 1290 Super Adventure is a 1301 cc V-twin adventure touring motorcycle from the Austrian manufacturer KTM. KTM's first production year for this motorcycle was 2015. It was selected as the Cycle World best adventure bike of 2015. The bike is marketed by KTM as a high performance adventure touring machine.

== Features ==
The KTM 1290 Super Adventure is a high performance touring machine. The bike is powered by two-cylinder 1301 cc LC8 engine producing 160 hp and 140 Nm of torque with 108 Nm at 2500 rpm. The Super Adventure features a motorcycle cruise control which is first from KTM. KTM offers multiple optional safety features including MTC (Motorcycle Traction Control), MSC (Motorcycle Stability Control), MSR (Motor Slip Regulation), and ABS brakes. KTM also installed LED cornering lights for improved cornering visibility in low light situations.

== 2017 models ==
In 2017 KTM launches the 1290 SuperAdventure S and 1290 SuperAdventure R variants, and renames the 1290 SuperAdventure T model to the model launched in 2015 (with some new features). The new S and R models feature a complete redesign of the headlight, a new dashboard with a 6" color TFT display, and a 6 US gal (23 L) fuel tank. The R model is the most off-road oriented model with features like 21-inch front and 18-inch wheels, a much smaller windshield, and manually adjusted damping. While the S model has 19-inch wheels front and 17-inch rear like model T, but in this case with alloy wheels, semi-active suspension, and as new key by proximity, KTM My Ride an Optional hands-free audio playback kit and a hermetic compartment for the smartphone.

== See also ==
- List of motorcycles by type of engine
- BMW R1200GS
- Moto Guzzi Stelvio
- Yamaha XT1200Z Super Ténéré
