= KTM 790 Duke =

Streetfighter motorcycle

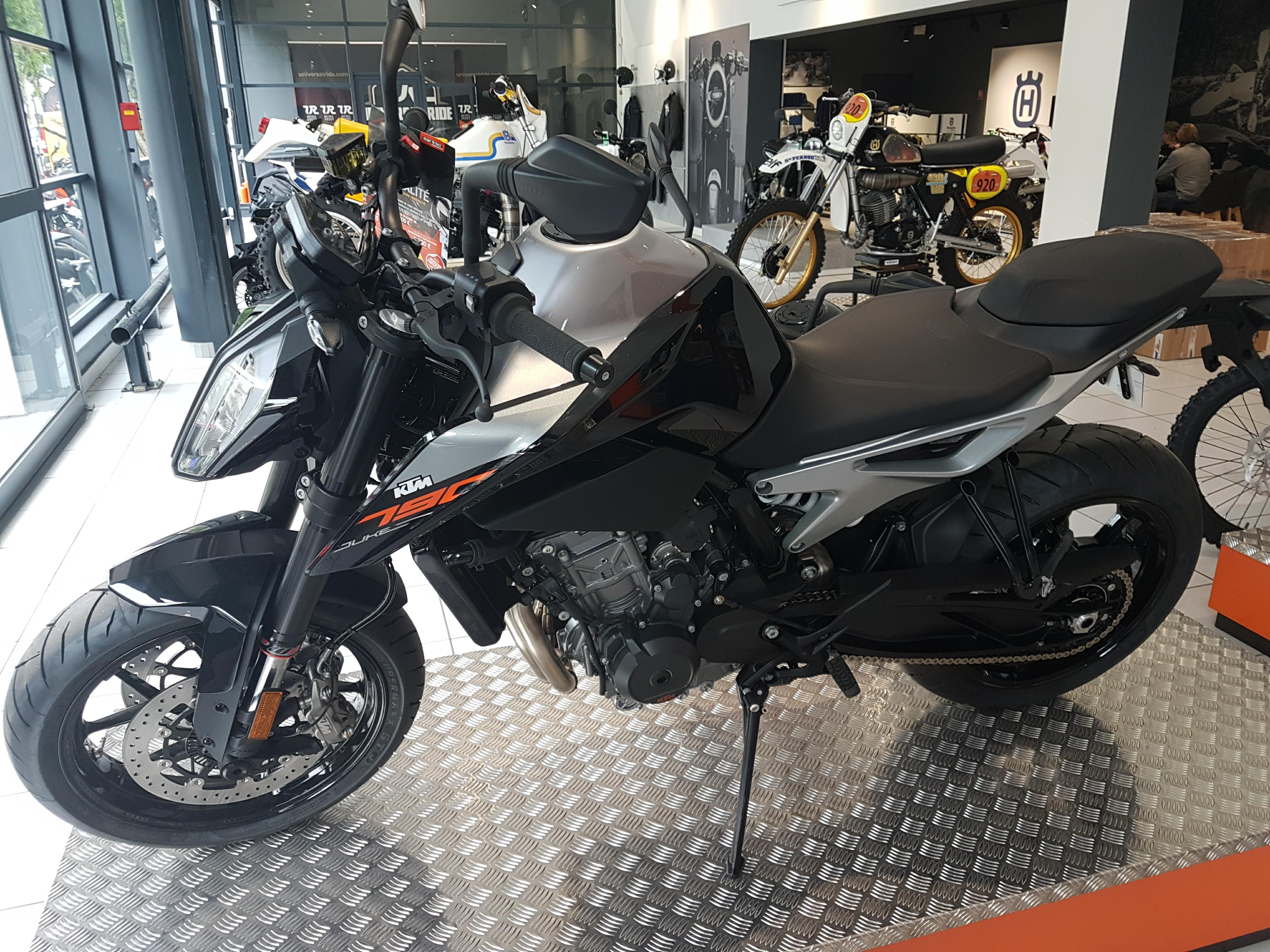
- KTM 790 Duke
- Manufacturer: KTM
- Also called: The Scalpel
- Production: 2017–2020, reintroduced 2023
- Predecessor: KTM 690 Duke
- Successor: KTM 890 Duke
- Class: Standard; Naked
- Engine: 799 cc (48.8 cu in) liquid-cooled 4-stroke parallel-twin
- Bore / stroke: 88 mm × 65.7 mm (3.46 in × 2.59 in)
- Power: 105 hp (78 kW) @ 8,500 rpm (claimed); 99.65 bhp (74.31 kW) @ 9,400 rpm (rear wheel)
- Torque: 63.6 lb⋅ft (86.2 N⋅m) (claimed); 60.75 ft⋅lb (82.37 N⋅m)
- Transmission: 6-speed
- Frame type: Tubular steel trellis frame
- Suspension: Front: WP Apex 43 mm inverted Rear: WP Apex Monoshock with adjustable preload
- Brakes: J.Juan duel 12 in (300 mm) disc 4 piston front radial front caliper and J.Juan single 9.4 in (240 mm) disc 1 piston rear caliper
- Tires: Maxxis Supermaxx ST - 120/70/17 front tyre, 180/55/17 rear tyre
- Wheelbase: 1,475 mm (58.1 in)
- Seat height: 32.5 in (825 mm)
- Weight: 372.5 lb (169 kg) (dry); 417 lb (189 kg) (wet)
- Fuel capacity: 14 L; 3.1 imp gal (3.7 US gal)
- Related: KTM Duke series KTM 690 Duke; KTM 1290 Super Duke R

The KTM 790 Duke is a naked parallel-twin motorcycle, manufactured by KTM from 2017. The Duke's 799 cc (48.8 cu in) liquid cooled eight-valve DOHC engine uses a 285° crankshaft in order to mimic KTM's 75° V-Twins. Its power output is 95 bhp in Europe (2023–present), and 105 bhp for the rest of the world.

They also did a 790 Duke L (2018–2020) model for A2 licenses in Europe. This made 95 bhp. For 2023, the 790 Duke L is the only model in Europe, despite not getting the "L" name.

The Duke is KTM's first parallel-twin bike; previously the factory had produced only singles and V-twins. Released in 2018 for the European market, KTM propose to release the Duke as a 2019 model to the US market in late 2018. Starting in 2021, this new model will be produced in China. It appears that no changes will be made to KTM's warranty, which covers the lesser of two years or twenty-four thousand miles, and guarantees the frame, swingarm, ignition system, engine parts inside the crankcase.

The Duke is also the first middleweight naked with an inertial measurement unit within its electronics that include ride-by-wire, fuel modes, and multi-level traction control. It also includes a bi-directional quickshifter. With a dry weight of 169 kg, the pared-down design is said to make the Duke the lightest bike in the middleweight naked market. KTM cooperated with Maxxis to develop special tyres for the Duke. The Duke also has an ultra-light chrome-molybdenum steel frame with die-cast aluminum rear supporting structure and die-cast aluminum trellis swingarm.

== Reception ==
The KTM Duke has received positive reviews.

In Motor Cycle News, senior bike tester Michael Neeves wrote that the KTM "manages to combine the best bits of its rivals", with "the speed and electronic sophistication of the Triumph Street Triple R, the punch and simplicity of the MT-07 and the cheekiness of the MT-09 ... with a dash of crazy 1290 Super Duke R". Neeves praises the KTM's riding position and comfort, but points out that wind protection is non-existent. His overall verdict: "Its engine is a peach, the chassis balanced and it's topped off with superbike-spec electronics".
