= KTM 50 SX =

- Manufacturer: KTM
- Class: Motocross
- Ignition type: Seletra analog
- Fuel delivery: Dell'Orto PHBG 19 BS
- Transmission: Single gear automatic
- Frame type: Double grinded central-double-cradle-type frame
- Wheelbase: 914 mm (35.98 inch)
- Seat height: 558 mm (22")
- Weight: 37.8 kg (83.33 lbs) (dry)
- Fuel capacity: 2 liters (0.53 gal)
- Ground clearance: 184 mm (7.24 inch)

The KTM 50 SX Mini is a youth Motorcycle made by KTM from 2008 to present.

== Model Progression ==
=== 2010 ===
- New ignition cover for improved sealing
- New inner clutch hub for improved reliability
- New gearbox shaft for improved reliability
- New water pump impeller for improved cooling and engine efficiency

=== 2008 ===
First model year for the 50 SX Mini
