= Motorex =

Swiss chemical manufacturer

MOTOREX-BUCHER GROUP AG
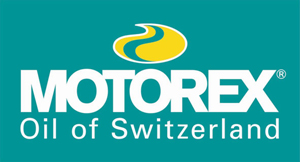

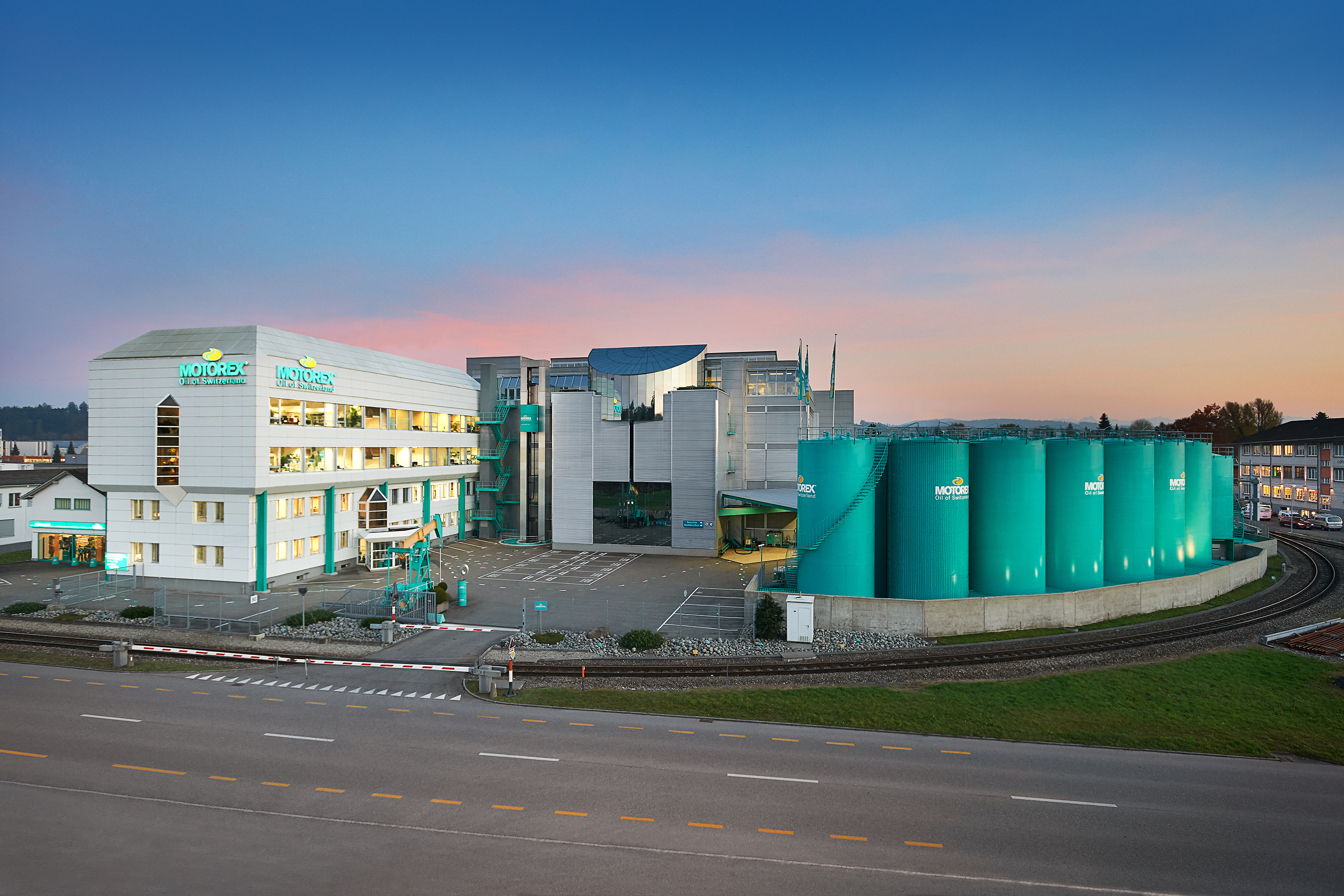
- Headquarters MOTOREX in Langenthal BE, Switzerland
- Company type: Joint-stock company (unlisted)
- Industry: Lubricants
- Founded: 1917 Fritz Jenzer 1920 Jenzer und Bucher 1938 Bucher & Cie AG 1947 MOTOREX
- Headquarters: Langenthal (canton of Bern), Switzerland
- Key people: • Edi Fischer (Managing Director) • Monique Regenass-Bucher (Chair of the Board of Directors)
- Revenue: CHF 180 million (2020)
- Number of employees: More than 350 (2020)

Motorex-Bucher Group AG (proper spelling: MOTOREX-BUCHER GROUP) is a Swiss family-owned company specializing in the development, production and marketing of lubricants, metalworking fluids, technical cleaning and care products as well as fluid equipment. The product range comprises more than 2,500 formulations and is continuously developed in cooperation with users, manufacturers (OEMs), industrial partners, motorsport teams as well as universities and research institutes.

== History ==
1917 Foundation of a small production of shoe and floor care products near Langenthal (Switzerland). 1920 Launch of the REX brand by company founder Arnold Bucher. Driven by the emerging motorization, entry into the lubricants market by Edi Bucher. 1947 Launch of the Motorex brand. In the following years, the company continued to develop on many levels. However, the ownership structure remained unchanged. Today's Motorex-Bucher Group AG is controlled by the 3rd and 4th generation of the Bucher family. The headquarters are located in Langenthal.

Production takes place at the 4 locations Langenthal, Toulon (F), Ostrowiec (PL) and Minneapolis (USA). Sales are handled by a network of 130 distributors in around 85 countries. Motorex employs people from over 20 countries.

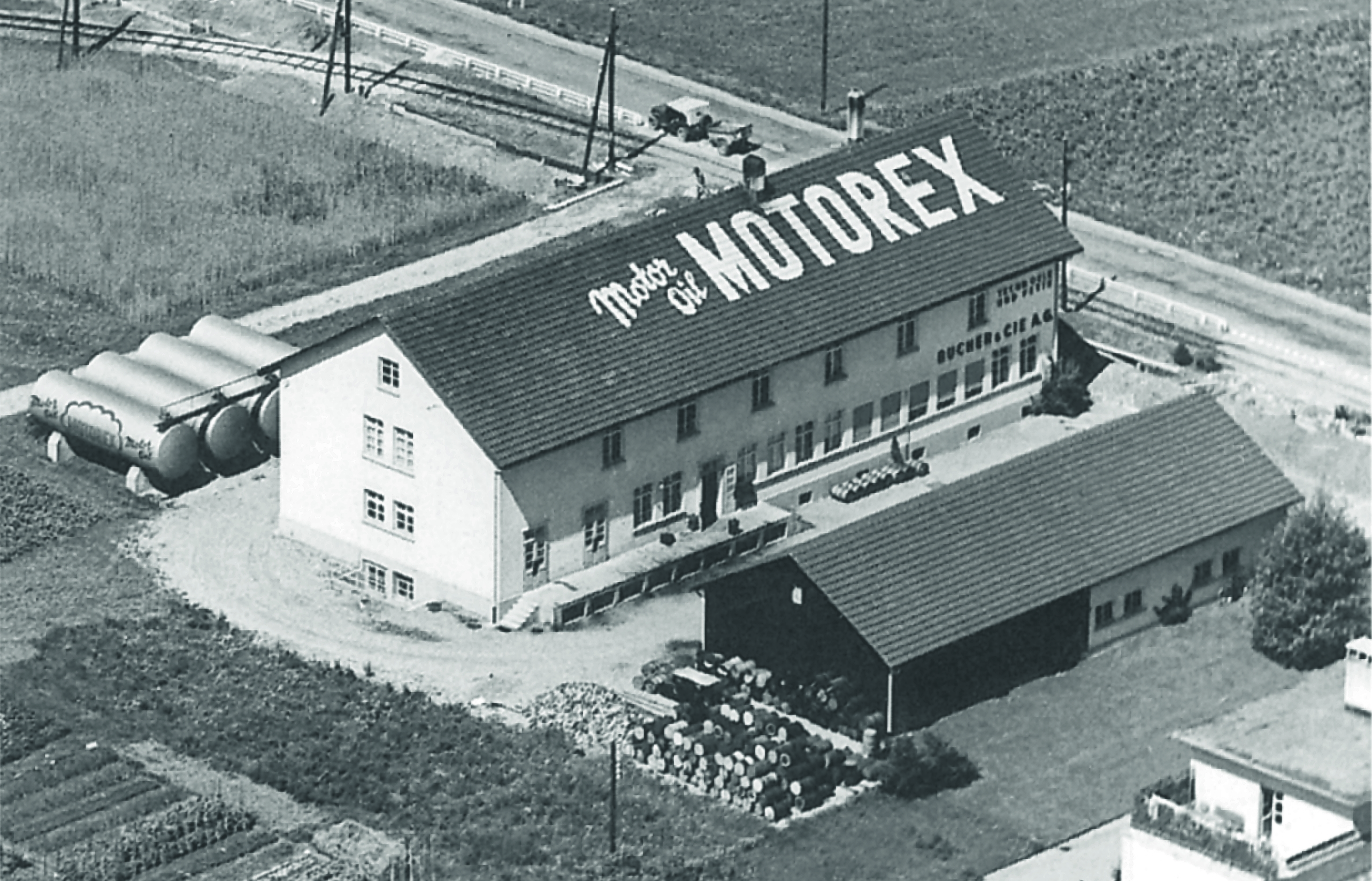
First aerial photograph from 1951 of the four horizontal storage tanks

== Products ==
Motorex is a developer and manufacturer of lubricants with research laboratories, production plants and global sales organizations. Motorex incorporates the following three factors into product development in addition to primary technical performance parameters:

- Reduction of emission levels: the emission of CO_{2} and other emissions, as well as high energy efficiency, can be significantly influenced by the quality of the lubricants used.
- Biodegradable products: A wide and growing range of biological and biodegradable products form a significant and rapidly growing part of the overall global business.
- User health protection: Lubricants and chemical engineering products are complex chemicals. Motorex pays attention to their human compatibility beyond the legal framework.

The company's products are marketed under the Motorex brand (worldwide) and also under the York brand in France. The range includes an assortment of over 8,000 items of engine, transmission and hydraulic oils, metalworking fluids (water-miscible and non-water-miscible), greases, spindle lubricants, engine coolants and heat transfer fluids, technical cleaning and maintenance products, brake fluids, additives and aerosols, as well as many specialty and niche products.
