= KTM 1190 =

KTM 1190 may refer to:

- KTM 1190 Adventure, a roadgoing/off-road (dual-sport) motorcycle introduced in 2013
- KTM 1190 RC8, a roadgoing sportbike motorcycle introduced in 2008
