= KTM RC250GP =

Racing motorcycle

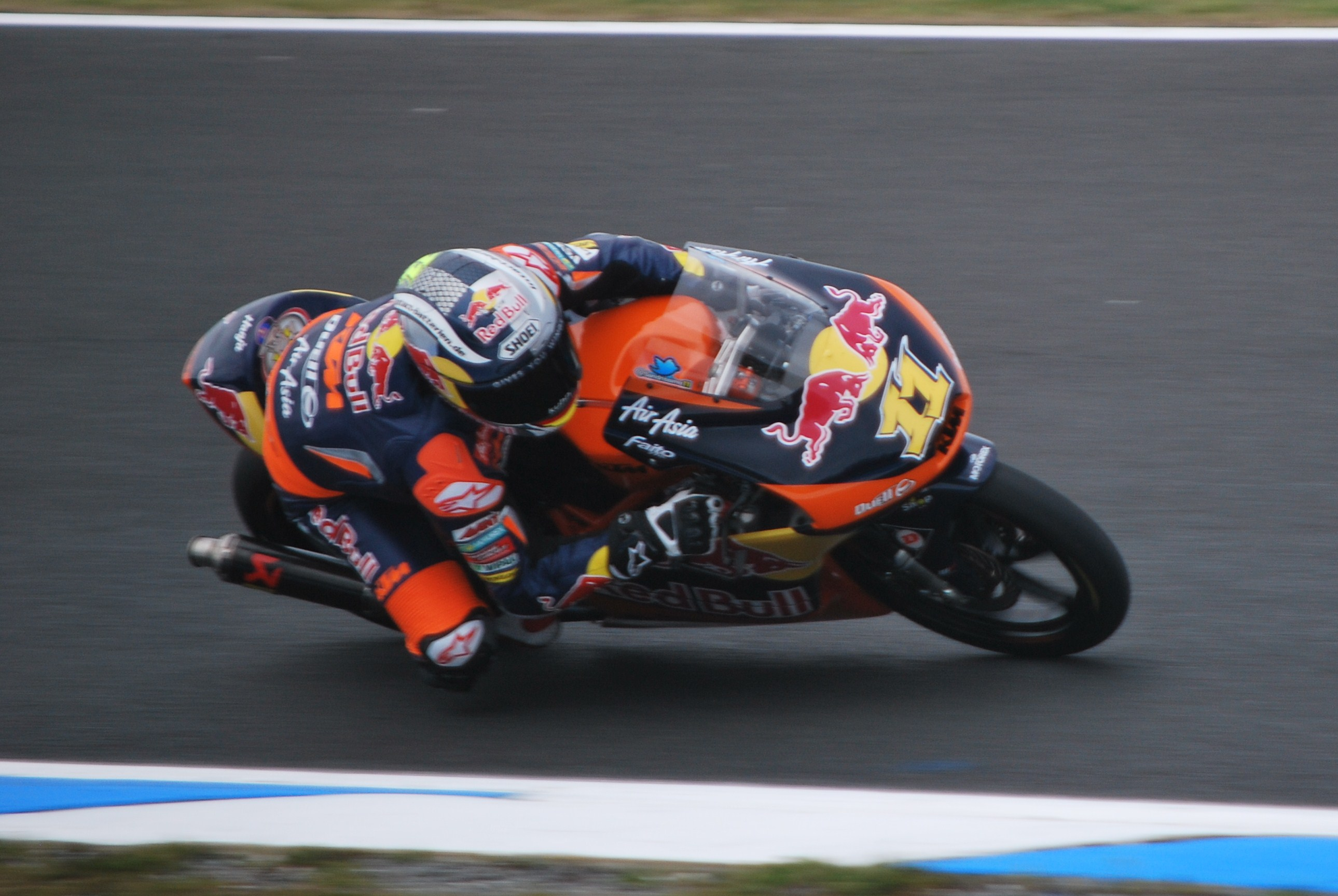
- Sandro Cortese riding the RC250GP at the 2012 Australian Grand Prix
- Manufacturer: KTM
- Production: 2012–present
- Predecessor: KTM 125 FRR
- Class: Moto3
- Engine: 249.5 cc (15.23 cu in) four-stroke single-cylinder
- Bore / stroke: 81 mm × 48.5 mm (3.19 in × 1.91 in)
- Transmission: 6-speed constant-mesh sequential manual, chain final-drive
- Wheelbase: 1,340 mm
- Weight: estimated 82kg (dry)
- Fuel capacity: approx. 10 liters
- Related: Husqvarna FR250GP; Gas Gas RC250GP; CFMoto Moto3

The RC250GP is a Grand Prix racing motorcycle designed and built by KTM for the Moto3 class, introduced in 2012. It is also used in the Moto3 Junior World Championship. The RC250GP is raced by KTM's factory racing program (Red Bull KTM Ajo) as well as supplied to numerous customer teams. The motorcycle is one of the most successful machines of the Moto3 era to date, having taken five constructors' championships, including a clean sweep in 2013 winning every one of the 17 races.

== Designation ==
The motorcycle's name derives from KTM's long-standing usage of the "RC" designation (short for "Road/Competition") for its sportbikes, beginning with the RC8, RC 390, and RC 125 production models and later also applied to its RC16 MotoGP prototype. The "250" relates to the engine displacement as mandated by Moto3 technical regulations. "GP" is short for Grand Prix, specifying the model to usage in Grand Prix racing, as opposed to its derivative models.

== Technical Description ==
All components of the motorcycle frame and engine are developed in-house by KTM. The frame is a steel tube trellis design, while the swingarm is of aluminium construction. The 250cc four-stroke single-cylinder engine is equipped by regulation with a limiter at 13,500 rpm (earlier 14,000 rpm, before Moto3 regulation changes), with maximum torque output beginning at around 10,500 rpm. The engine feeds a 6-gear transmission according to regulations. Suspension components are developed and produced by KTM subsidiary WP Suspension. The Slovenian manufacturer Akrapovič supplies the exhaust system. The braking system is supplied by Brembo and consists of two steel discs controlled by twin-piston calipers on the front wheel and a single disc on the rear wheel. The elliptical shaped air intake is placed on the front fairing, while the duct that connects it to the airbox passes under the steering head. KTM claims a dry weight of the machine of approx. 82 kg though Moto3 regulations set a minimum combined weight of 152 kg for the bike and fully-equipped rider.

Dimensions and weights
Wheelbase	1,340 mm
Dry weight	82 kg
Tank capacity	10 L
Combined weight (bike + fuel + rider)	152 kg
Mechanics
Engine type	four-stroke single-cylinder
Displacement (bore, stroke)	249.5 cm^{3} (Ø81mm, 48.5mm)
Compression ratio	14.5:1
Cooling system	liquid
Valvetrain	DOHC, 4 valves per cylinder, chain drive
Fuel induction	digital electronic indirect multi-point port injection
Ignition	variable advance CDI
ECU	Dellorto DoPe 3.0 (series spec ECU)
Power	<55 bhp (41 kW) @ 13,500 rpm
Maximum engine speed	14,000 rpm
Transmission	6-speed sequential manual, final chain-drive
Starter	push start
Exhaust system	Akrapovič titanium twin-pipe system
Chassis
Frame	Tubular steel trellis, adjustable rake angle and swingarm pivot
Swingarm	Pivoted, aluminium-construction
Fork	WP Suspension 45mm USD
Rear suspension	WP Suspension monoshock with hydraulic height and preload adjustment
Brakes, front	2x Ø190 mm steel discs, Brembo twin-piston radial calipers
Brakes, rear	Ø190 mm steel disc, Brembo twin-piston radial caliper
Wheel, front	OZ Racing 17"/2.5" forged magnesium rim, Dunlop 95/70-17 tire
Wheel, rear	OZ Racing 17"/3.5" forged magnesium rim, Dunlop 115/70-17 tire

== Grand Prix Racing Results ==
=== Constructors' Championship results ===
Season	Points	Position
2012	346	1st
2013	425	1st
2014	384	1st
2015	341	2nd
2016	382	1st
2017	248	2nd
2018	353	2nd
2019	347	2nd
2020	318	2nd
2021	369	1st
2022	323	3rd
2023	394	1st
2024	333	2nd
2025	540	1st

In 2013, KTM RC250GP machines won all races in the season, achieving the maximum possible points total.

=== Rider's Champions ===
- (Germany) Sandro Cortese, 2012, 325 pts.
- (Spain) Maverick Viñales, 2013, 323 pts.
- (South Africa) Brad Binder, 2016, 319 pts.
- (Spain) Albert Arenas, 2020, 174 pts.
- (Spain) Pedro Acosta, 2021, 259 pts.

== Derivative Models ==
=== RC250R ===
Also known as the "Production Racer", KTM build a limited production of track-only bikes between 2013 and 2016 based on the RC250GP known as the RC250R. It was intended to be a cheaper "entry level" model for private racers. The bike was subsequently entered as a number of one-off wildcard entries by various teams in the 2014 season. The RC250R features a number of differences compared to the RC250GP, including

- slightly down-tuned engine producing 37 kW (50 bhp) @ 13,000 rpm and maximum torque of 28 Nm @ 11,000 rpm
- maximum engine speed is limited to 13,500 rpm
- simplified 2-into-1 titanium exhaust from Akrapovič (as opposed to the RC250GP's twin-pipe system with one exhaust pipe per exhaust valve/port) with additional dB-killer
- triple clamps from milled aluminium (as opposed to magnesium on the RC250GP)
- wheels changed to forged aluminium
- front brakes changed to a single Ø290 mm disc with Brembo 4-piston radial caliper
- rear brake changed to a caliper and master cylinder from the manufacturer Formula
- suspension changed to WP Suspension series-production components: Ø35 USD fork RCMA 3548, rear monoshock BAVP 4618
- ECU changed to an Athena GET unit (as opposed to the Moto3 series spec unit from Dellorto on the RC250GP)

=== RC250RBR ===
For the Red Bull MotoGP Rookies Cup, KTM prepares identical, sealed motorcycles for each rider. The RC250RBR is essentially an RC250R featuring a few upgrades, such as an Akrapovič twin-pipe megaphone exhaust system without dB-killer, similar to the exhaust of the original RC250GP. Previously the engine rev limit was reduced to 13,000 rpm to aid in extending the service life of the engine, but has since been raised to the 13,500 limit of the base RC250R.

=== Husqvarna FR250GP ===
KTM purchased Husqvarna Motorcycles from BMW Motorrad in early 2013. As a marketing move by KTM to promote its new brand, Husqvarna entered the Moto3 paddock as a unique manufacturer in the 2014 and 2015 seasons with its FR250GP motorcycle. The FR250GP is however simply a badge-engineered RC250GP. The "FR" designation comes from Husqvarna's series product naming conventions with the "F" signifying a four-stroke model and the "R" likely meaning "race". Husqvarna re-entered Moto3 beginning in 2020 with Max Biaggi's team Max Racing.

==== Constructors' Championship Results ====
Season	Points	Position
2014	156	4th
2015	85	4th
2020	86	3rd
2021	166	4th
2022	279	4th
2023	307	3rd
2024	269	4th

=== GasGas RC250GP ===
KTM purchased a controlling stake in the Spanish motocross and trials bike manufacturer GasGas in 2019. Similar to the previous move with Husqvarna, KTM entered GasGas as a unique manufacturer in the Moto3 championship starting from 2021 with Aspar Team.

==== Constructors' Championship Results ====
Season	Points	Position
2021	266	3rd
2022	389	1st
2023	270	4th
2024	265	5th

==== Rider's Champions ====
- (Spain) Izan Guevara, 2022, 319 pts.

=== CFMoto Moto3 ===
KTM's Chinese partner CFMoto entered the Moto3 championship as a unique manufacturer with Prüstel GP starting from 2022, using rebranded RC250GP bikes.

==== Constructors' Championship Results ====
Season	Points	Position
2022	130	5th
2023	113	5th
2024	421	1st

==== Rider's Champions ====
- (Colombia) David Alonso, 2024, 421 pts.

== See also ==
- Honda NSF250R
- FTR M3
- Suter MMX3
- Mahindra MGP3O
- Ioda TR
- Oral Engineering OE-250M3R
