= KTM 990 Adventure =

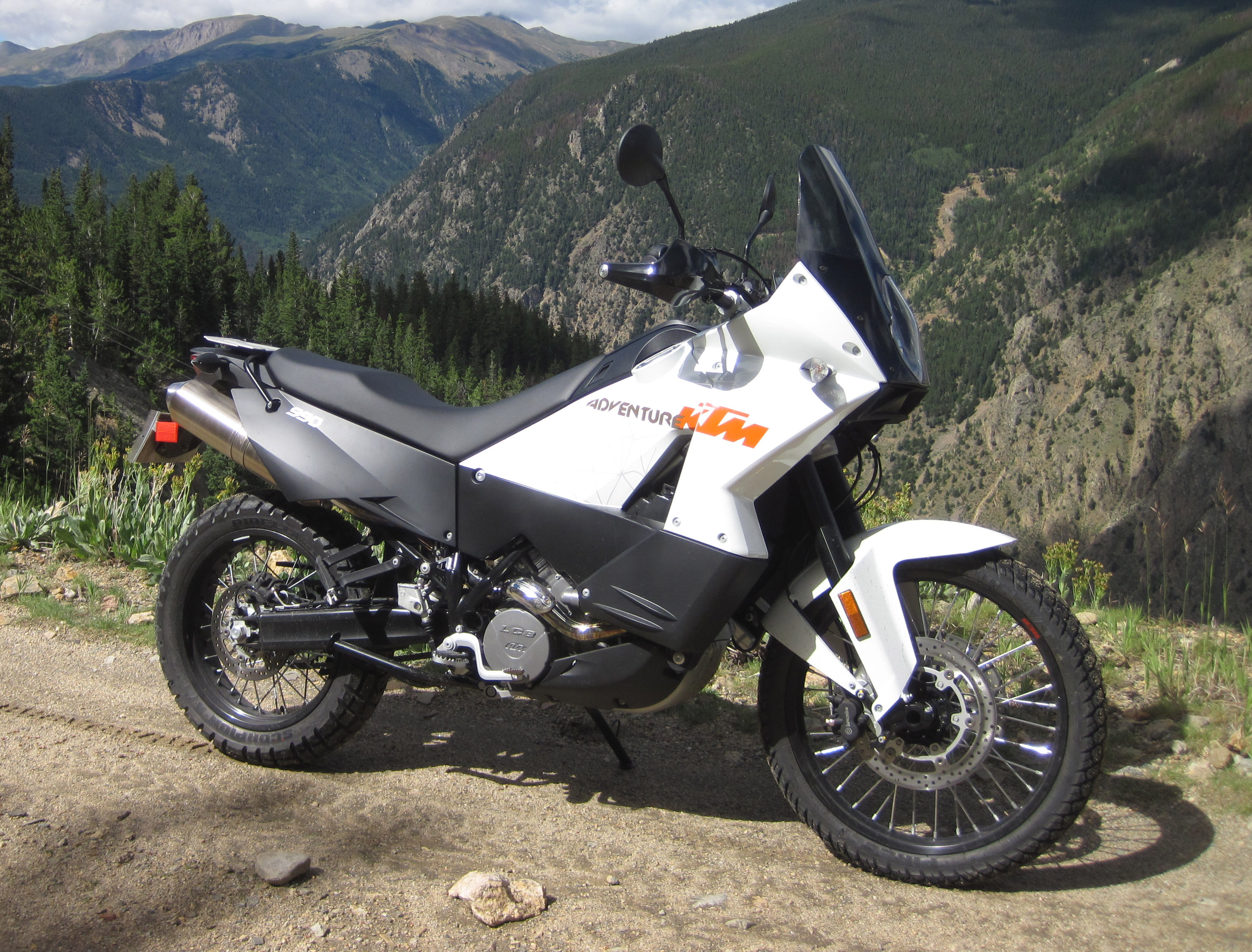
- Manufacturer: KTM
- Production: 2006–2013
- Predecessor: KTM 950 Adventure
- Successor: KTM 1190 Adventure
- Class: Dual-sport motorcycle
- Engine: 999.9 cc (61.02 cu in) 75° V-twin
- Bore / stroke: 101 mm × 62.4 mm (3.98 in × 2.46 in)
- Compression ratio: 11.5:1
- Power: 78 kW (105 hp)@ 8,250 rpm
- Torque: 100 N⋅m (74 lbf⋅ft) @ 6,500 rpm
- Ignition type: E-Starter
- Transmission: 6 gears, dog clutch engagement
- Frame type: Chromium-Molybdenum trellis frame, powder-coated with Aluminium subframe
- Suspension: Front: WP USD 48 mm (1.9 in) diameter, 210 mm (8.3 in) travel Rear: WP mono shock PDS with hydr. spring preload - 210 mm (8.3 in) travel
- Brakes: Front: 2 x Brembo two piston, floating caliper, floating brake disc, 300 mm (11.81 inch); Rear: Brembo two piston, floating caliper, floating brake disc 240 mm (9.45 inch); Optional Brembo two channel ABS
- Tires: 90/90 R21 (front) 150/70 R18 (rear)
- Rake, trail: 119 mm (4.7 in)
- Wheelbase: 1,570 mm (62 in)
- Seat height: 860 mm (34 in)
- Weight: 209 kg (461 lb) (dry)
- Fuel capacity: 19.5 L (4.3 imp gal; 5.2 US gal) including 4 L reserve
- Oil capacity: 3 L (3.2 US qt)

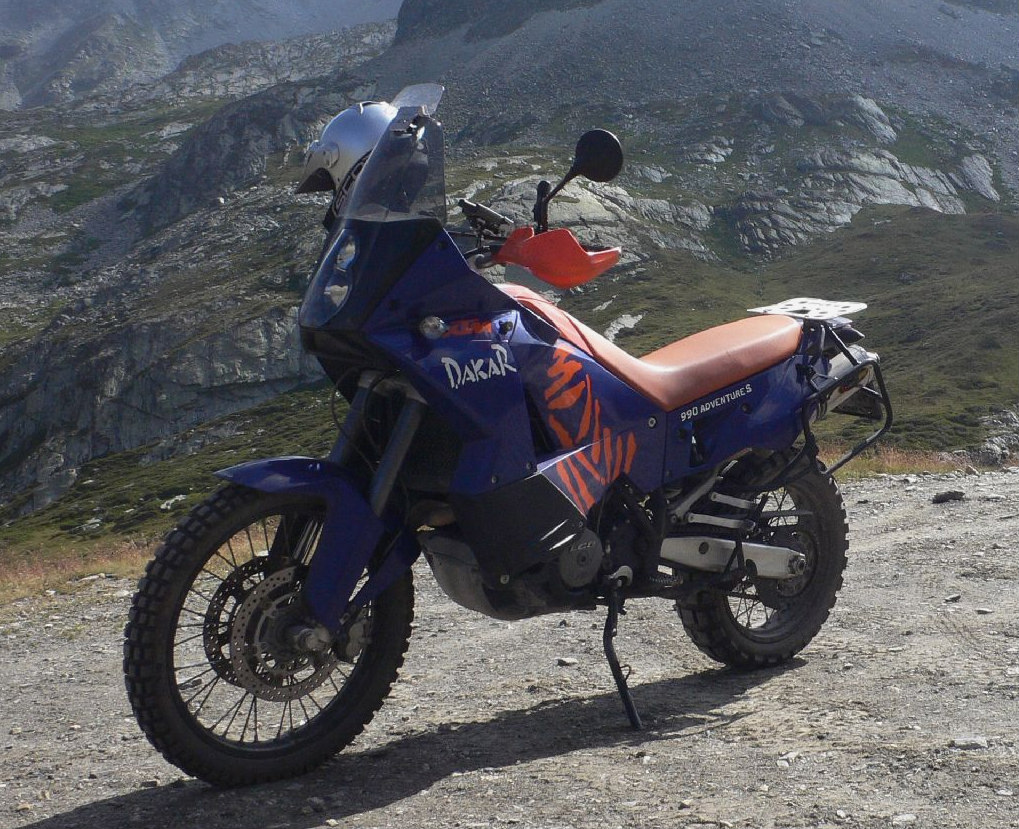
KTM Adventure S

The KTM 990 Adventure is a dual-sport motorcycle produced in Austria by KTM. The bike is powered by the LC8 liquid cooled, four-stroke, DOHC 999 cc 75° V-twin engine, producing around 78 kW (105 hp). It is capable of a top speed of around 123 mph (198 km/h), with its engine evolved from the 950 Adventure. The bore and stroke were increased from 100 mm × 60 mm (3.94 by 2.36 inches) to 101 mm × 62.4 mm (3.98 by 2.46 inches). The engine also features a revised camshaft and the carburetor was replaced with the electronic fuel injection. Brakes are Brembo two-channel ABS, except the S and the R versions which have no ABS.
