= KTM 1190 Adventure =

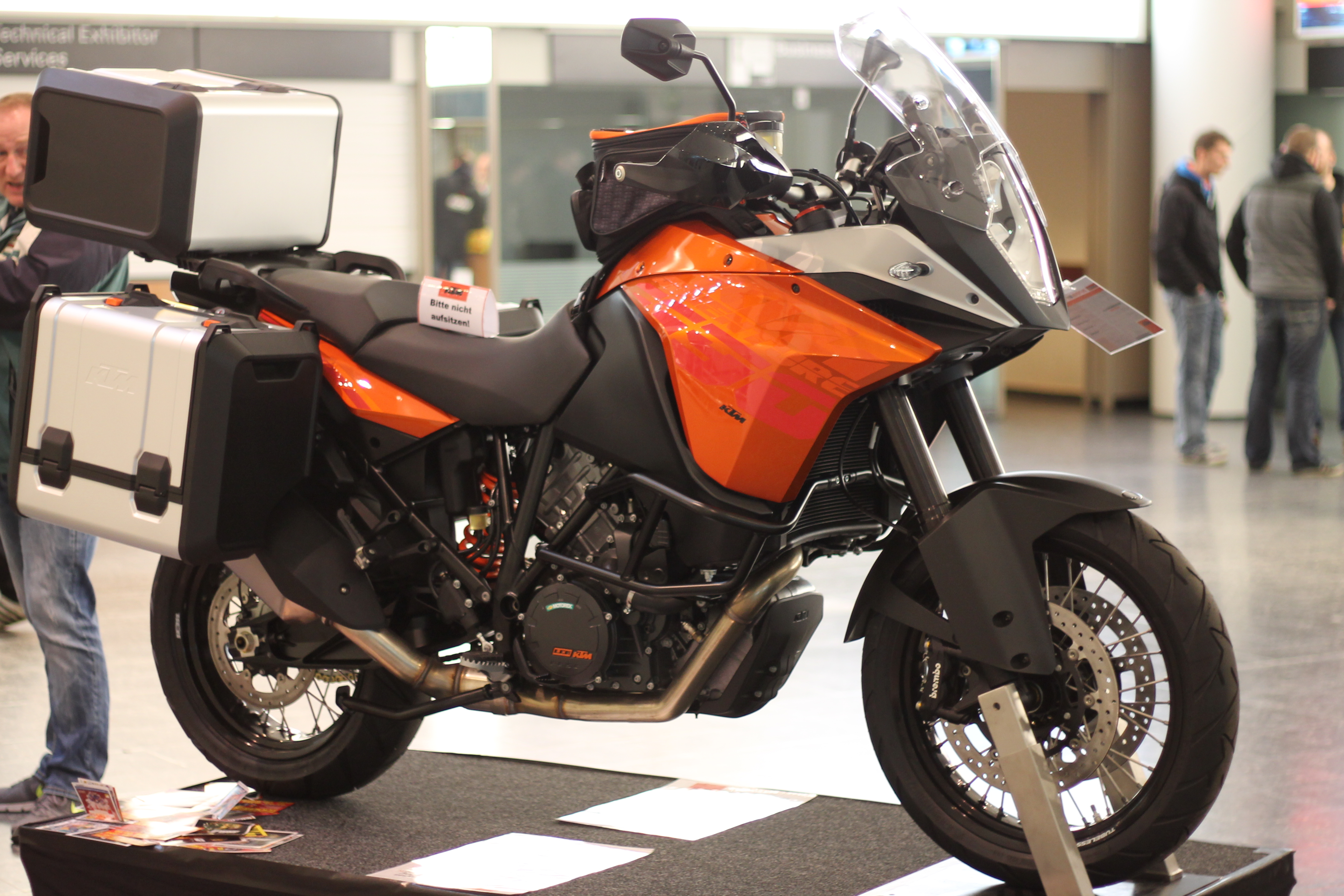
- Manufacturer: KTM
- Production: 2013–2016
- Predecessor: 990 Adventure
- Successor: 1290 Super Adventure
- Class: Adventure touring
- Engine: 1195 cc, 8-valve, 75° V-twin
- Bore / stroke: 105 mm × 69 mm (4.13 in × 2.72 in)
- Power: 148 hp (110 kW)
- Torque: 92.2 ft⋅lb (125.0 N⋅m)
- Ignition type: double ignition
- Transmission: 6-speed, PASC (TM) slipper clutch, hydraulically actuated, chain drive
- Frame type: Steel tube trellis
- Suspension: Front: 48 mm WP fork with adjustable rebound and compression Rear: WP shock with adjustable preload, compression and damping Optional electronic damping control
- Brakes: Front: Dual 320 mm disc; Brembo 4-pot caliper Rear: Single 260 mm disc; 2-pot caliper Semi-linked ABS
- Tires: Front: 120/70/R19"; Rear: 170/60/R17"
- Rake, trail: 26°
- Wheelbase: 61.4 in (1,560 mm)
- Seat height: 890 mm (35 in)
- Weight: 467 lb (212 kg) (dry)
- Fuel capacity: 6.1 US gal (23 L)

The KTM 1190 Adventure is a 1195 cc V-twin adventure touring motorcycle from the Austrian manufacturer KTM. The model was revealed at the October 2012 Intermot trade show for the 2014 model year.

The motor is based on the KTM LC8 powerplant in the RC8 sportbike. Like the RC8, and unlike its predecessor the 990 Adventure, the 1190 Adventure uses ride-by-wire throttle. Cycle World and Motor Cycle News noted the electronic rider aids including ride-by-wire and electronic suspension control, up until now foregone by KTM to emphasize off-road performance, are intended to position the 1190 Adventure against technologically advanced street-going rivals like the Ducati Multistrada 1200. It is the first bike with Bosch's Anti-Lowside Technology, the so-called Motorcycle Stability Control (MSC).
