= KTM 950 Adventure =

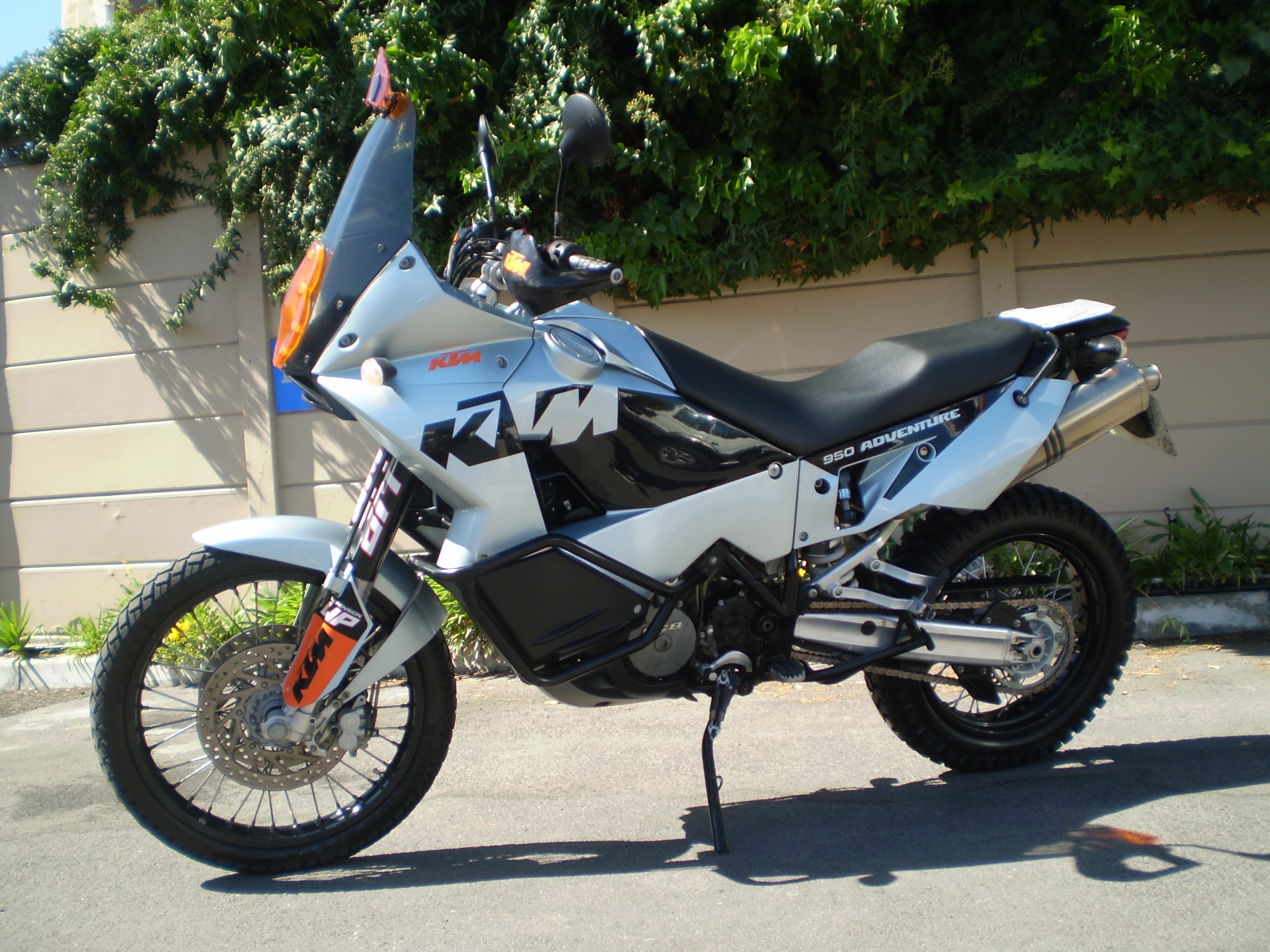
- Manufacturer: KTM
- Also called: KTM LC8 Adventure
- Production: 2003–2006
- Successor: KTM 990 Adventure
- Class: Dual-sport motorcycle
- Engine: 942 cc (57.5 cu in) 75° V-twin
- Bore / stroke: 100 mm × 60 mm (3.94 in × 2.36 in)
- Compression ratio: 11.5:1
- Top speed: 215km/h
- Power: 102 bhp (76 kW) @ 8,000 rpm
- Torque: 97 N⋅m (72 lbf⋅ft) @ 6,000 rpm
- Ignition type: Denso CDI
- Transmission: 6 gears
- Frame type: Open cradle, chrome-molybdenum steel tubes with Aluminium subframe
- Suspension: Front: WP USD 4860 MXMA (damping and rebound adjustable) 48 mm (1.9 in) diameter Rear: WP Progressive Damping System (PDS) shock absorber with adjustable hydraulic preload, rebound, separate low and high speed compression damping.
- Brakes: Front: 2 x Brembo perforated brake disks, 300 mm (12 in) floating calipers Rear: 1 x Brembo disk 240 mm (9.4 in) with floating caliper.
- Tires: Front: 90/90 R21; Rear: 150/70 R18
- Rake, trail: 26.6°/ 119 mm (4.7 in)
- Wheelbase: 1,570 mm (62 in) ± 10 mm (0.39 inch)
- Seat height: 2003/2004: 880 mm (35 in), 2003/2004 S: 915 mm (36.0 in), 2005/2006: 860 mm (34 in), 2005/2006 S: 895 mm (35.2 in)
- Weight: 206 kg (454 lb) (dry)
- Fuel capacity: 22 L (4.8 imp gal; 5.8 US gal) (including 4 L (0.88 imp gal; 1.1 US gal) reserve)
- Oil capacity: 3.3 L (0.73 imp gal; 0.87 US gal)
- Fuel consumption: 6.4 L/100km (43 to 24 MPG)

The KTM 950 Adventure is a Dual-sport motorcycle produced in Austria by KTM. The bike is powered by a liquid cooled, four-stroke, DOHC 942 cc 75° V-twin engine, producing around 102 bhp (76 kW).

== History ==
The story of KTM 950 Adventure started in 1992. That year, a one-off special called the Bepono, built for the German BoTT series by two engineering students by combining a pair of cylinders from a KTM LC4 single on a special crankcase, was displayed on the KTM stand at the IFMA Show in Cologne.

Although, this was just a teaser. The second time around in 1996, the Stuttgart-based design office Kraft Technik, commissioned by KTM to produce a design for a V-twin Hard Enduro, possibly using the 60-degree V-twin RSV900 Rotax engine they were developing for Aprilia. Unfortunately, the Italians refused to share it with their Austrian neighbors. An alternative was the Swedish Folan 60-degree V-twin engine, however that co-venture was aborted after KTM was successful on the stock market.

Early-1998, as the company grew in strength and the need to expand its single-cylinder range with a twin-cylinder product line, a new V-twin became a priority. Accordingly, KTM chief engineer Wolfgang Felber studied twin-cylinder engine formats and vehicle concepts.

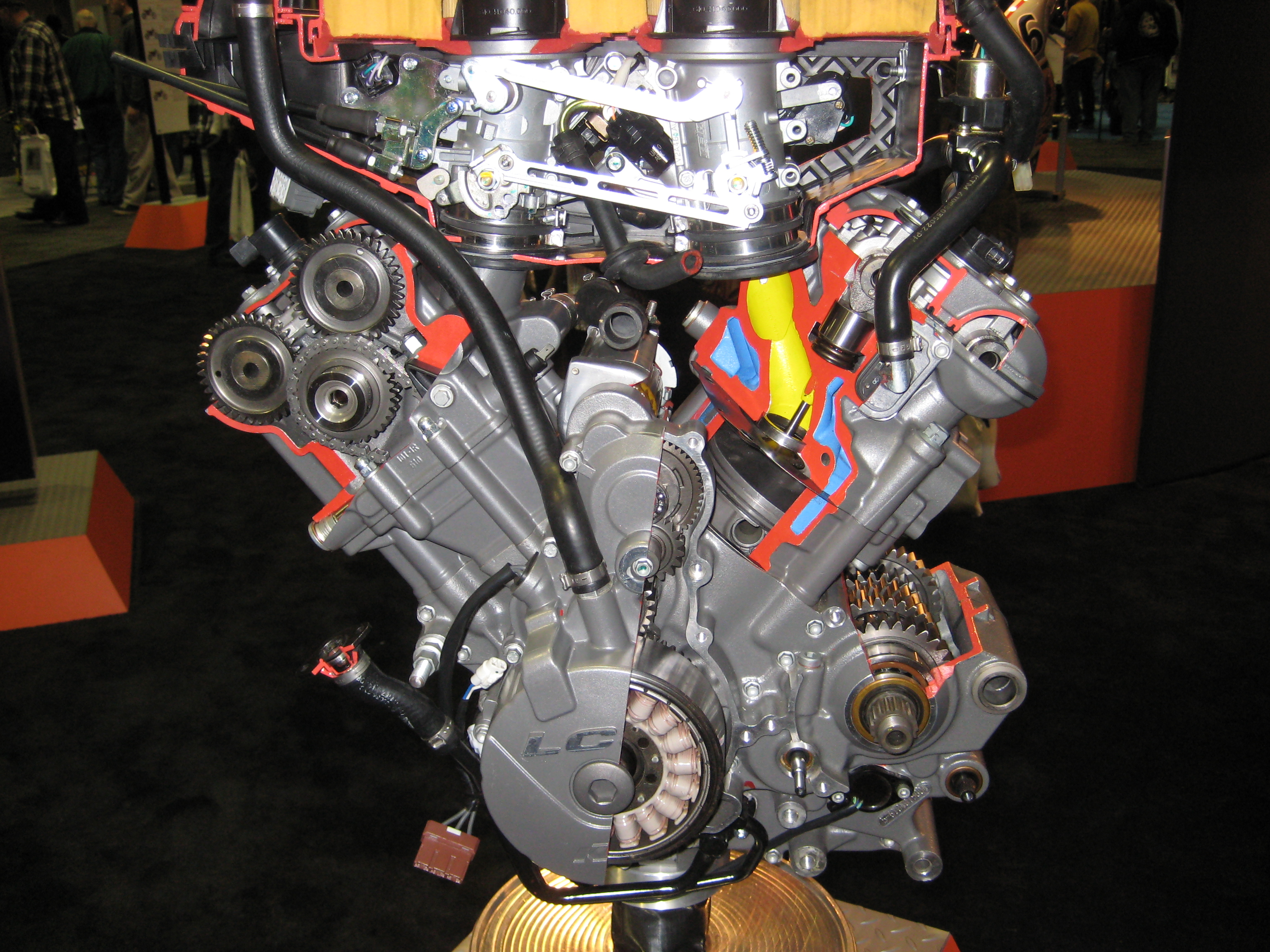
KTM LC8 engine

By August 1998, the design team settled on a 75-degree V-twin design, with emphasis on light weight and compact build. To do so, KTM assumed the entire R&D process in-house, and hired Claus Holweg as Project Manager from their Austrian neighbors Rotax.

Within a year, the new 'LC8' engine line had its first dyno run on August 11, 1999.

After the successful engine development, KTM worked on the design of the body of 950 Adventure.

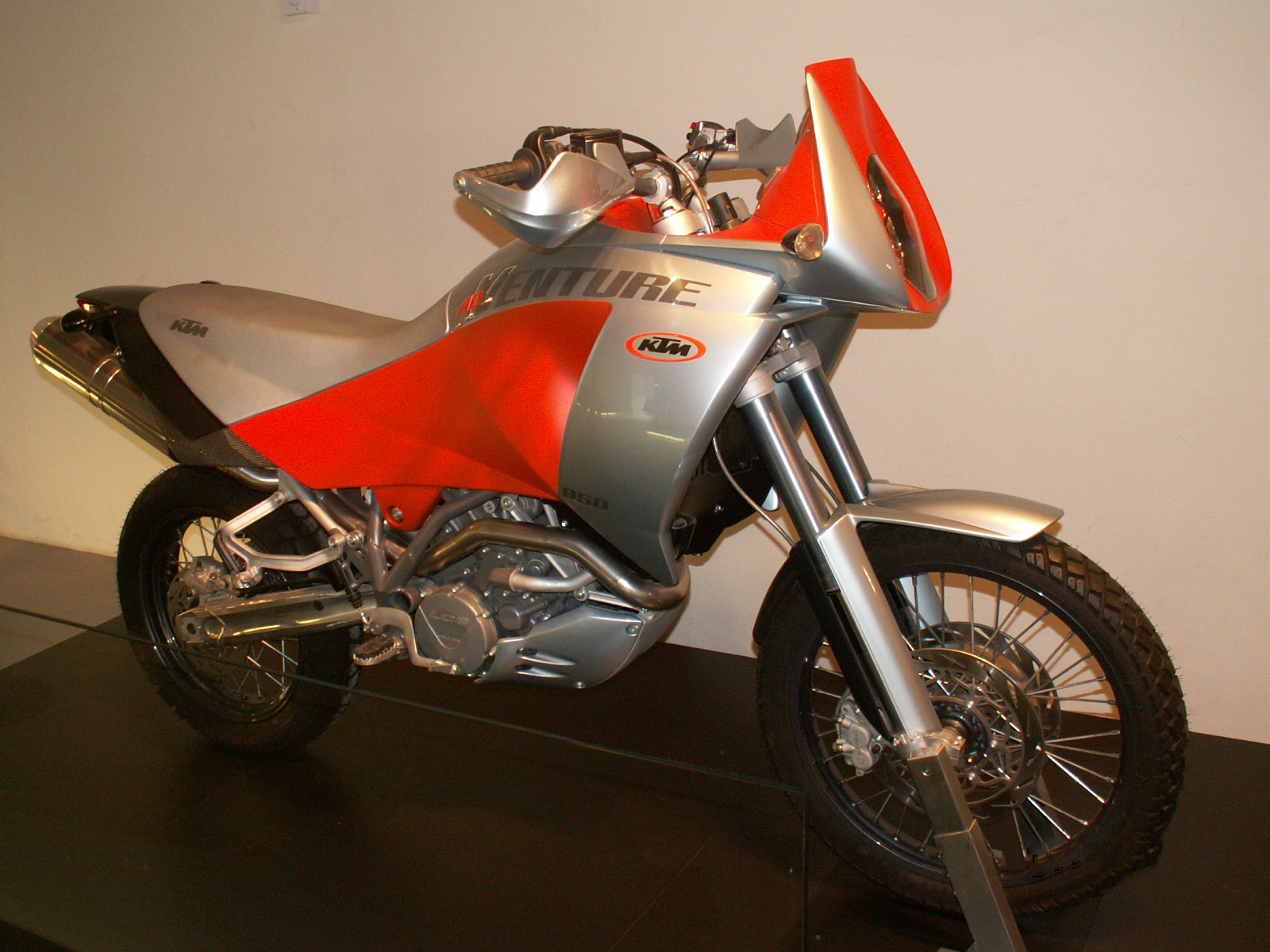
KTM Adventure prototype

Development and management departments of KTM put designers and model-makers together to establish a concept vehicle. The prototype's design was completed by KISKA GmbH, design partner of KTM, and presented at Munich Motorcycle show in 2000.

After the critical votes, KTM CEO Stefan Pierer rejected the first draft of the Adventure except for a few details, chassis, and engine.

KTM's designers were innovative in defining their design, using strained and broken lines with an angular fairing. For valuable real-world experience, the engineering team asked rally pilot Fabrizio Meoni to assist.

Early-2001, engineers fabricated a frame house with ratings defined by Meoni. February 2001, he initiated a series of real-world evaluations in Tunisia.

Later that year, Fabrizio Meoni won Rallye des Pharaons 2001 following superior victory on the Dakar in 2002, confirming the 950 Adventure was ready to market.

The 950 Adventure was formally presented in at the 2003 Intermot Motorcycle show. Production of the LC8 began in February 2003.

2006, KTM stopped producing 950 Adventure. The successor was KTM 990 Adventure with slightly different displacement and fuel injectors instead of carburetors.

== Suspension ==
Front and rear suspensions were made by White Power ('WP') in the Netherlands, a subsidiary of KTM. Front suspensions (also known as forks) allow compression adjustment at the bottom as well as damping adjustments at the top of the forks. Spring pre-load can be adjusted by on the top cap of the forks.

Rear suspension (shock absorber) has re-bound adjustment at the bottom of the shock. High/low speed dampening are adjustable using a clicker dial and a 14mm hex at the top (High/Low speed dampening are referring to speed of compressing the spring, not speed of the motorcycle).

Rear shock on all adventure models of 950 and 990 have hydraulic pre-load adjustment accessible with a knob on the left side of the motorcycle. KTM 950 Super Enduro R version has a mechanical large nut compressing the spring instead.

=== Suspension travel ===
Front and rear suspension travel was changed by KTM during the production run. Seat height and ground clearance were subsequently affected.

Year	model	Suspensions travel	Seat height, unloaded	Ground clearance, unloaded
2003	950 Adventure	230 mm (9.1 in)	880 mm (35 in)	281 mm (11.1 in)
2003	950 Adventure S	265 mm (10.4 in)	915 mm (36.0 in)	316 mm (12.4 in)
2004	950 Adventure	230 mm (9.1 in)	880 mm (35 in)	281 mm (11.1 in)
2004	950 Adventure S	265 mm (10.4 in)	915 mm (36.0 in)	316 mm (12.4 in)
2005	950 Adventure	210 mm (8.3 in)	860 mm (34 in)	261 mm (10.3 in)
2005	950 Adventure S	245 mm (9.6 in)	895 mm (35.2 in)	296 mm (11.7 in)
2006	950 Adventure	210 mm (8.3 in)	860 mm (34 in)	261 mm (10.3 in)
2006	950 Adventure S	245 mm (9.6 in)	895 mm (35.2 in)	296 mm (11.7 in)
2007	990 Adventure	210 mm (8.3 in)	860 mm (34 in)	261 mm (10.3 in)
2007	990 Adventure S	265 mm (10.4 in)	915 mm (36.0 in)	316 mm (12.4 in)
2008	990 Adventure	210 mm (8.3 in)	860 mm (34 in)	261 mm (10.3 in)
2008	990 Adventure S	265 mm (10.4 in)	915 mm (36.0 in)	316 mm (12.4 in)
2009	990 Adventure	210 mm (8.3 in)	880 mm (35 in)	261 mm (10.3 in)
2009	990 Adventure R	265 mm (10.4 in)	920 mm (36 in)	316 mm (12.4 in)
2010	990 Adventure	210 mm (8.3 in)	880 mm (35 in)	261 mm (10.3 in)
2010	990 Adventure R	265 mm (10.4 in)	920 mm (36 in)	316 mm (12.4 in)
2011	990 Adventure	210 mm (8.3 in)	880 mm (35 in)	261 mm (10.3 in)
2011	990 Adventure R	245 mm (9.6 in)	905 mm (35.6 in)	301 mm (11.9 in)
2006	950 Super Enduro R	250 mm (9.8 in) front 255 mm (10.0 in) rear	965 mm (38.0 in)	330 mm (13 in)
2008	950 Super Enduro R	250 mm (9.8 in) front 255 mm (10.0 in) rear	965 mm (38.0 in)	330 mm (13 in)

== Modifications ==
Year	950 Adventure	950 Adventure S	Changes
2003	Grey-Black	Orange	N\A
2004	Grey-Black, Black, Orange	Blue-Orange colors of Rally Raid Gauloises Team with 'GO !!!!!!!!!!!' slogan	Darker windscreen fairing; Front fender is painted evenly with the dominant color of the body; Tank protection at the bottom; Wheels' rims are black
2005	Black, Orange	Blue-Orange, but 'GO !!!!!!!!!!!' slogan removed	Engine: The multipurpose shaft, The clutch is modified to reduce mechanical noise; Carburettor is equipped with electric heaters (to reduce freezing in cold weather); Suspension travel is reduced by 20mm (from 230 to 210 mm and from 265 to 245mm on S model); Front wheel is more resistant to off-road use; Rear rim pass from 4.00" to 4.25"; Rear caliper pistons have thermal protection; Saddle shape is re-designed and different foam for better comfort; Thermal protection of the exhaust manifold before the cylinder was lengthened; A splash protection (protecting the electric element placed in front of the air-box) was added under the frame behind the steering column; A new fan shroud cooling to direct the exhaust air for less heat on the left knee of the driver

== See also ==
Other large dual-sport motorcycles :

- BMW R1200GS
- KTM 950 Super Enduro R
- Yamaha XT1200Z Super Ténéré
- Ducati Multistrada 1200
