= KTM 950 Super Enduro R =

Motorcycle

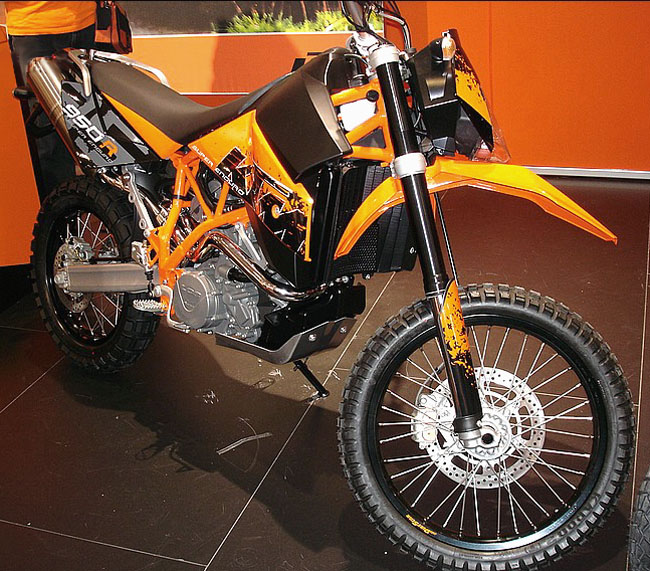
- Manufacturer: KTM
- Also called: KTM 950 SE
- Production: 2006-2008
- Successor: 690 Enduro R
- Engine: Twin cylinder, 4-stroke, V 75°, 942cc
- Bore / stroke: 100 x 60 mm (3.94 x 2.36")
- Compression ratio: 11.5:1
- Ignition type: Denso battery ignition
- Transmission: 6 gears, dog-clutch engagement
- Frame type: tubular chrome-molybdenum-steel space frame
- Suspension: Front: WP USD Ø 48 mm (1.89"), 250mm (9.84") travel / Rear:WP monoshock PDS 255 mm (10.04") travel
- Tires: Front: 90/90-21 Rear: 140/80-18
- Wheelbase: 1577 mm (62")
- Seat height: 965 mm (38")
- Weight: 190 kg (419.4 lbs) (dry)
- Fuel capacity: 14 liters (3.7 USgal)

The KTM 950 Super Enduro R (known as the 950SE or the SE) is a dual-sport motorcycle produced from 2006 to 2008. It is equipped with a 98-horsepower, four-stroke, V-twin engine, adjustable heavy-duty offroad suspension, and enduro styling. Due to its light weight and offroad-capable profile, the 950SE was perceived at its launch as a radical departure from any existing dual-sport, enduro, or street bike models, while having characteristics of all three.

== Overview ==
Marketed by KTM, its Austrian manufacturer, as a race-ready enduro machine, the 950SE embodies minimalist design principles. Equipped with twin carburetors instead of electronic fuel injection, it also lacks ABS, traction control, a fuel gauge, or a tachometer. Its dual silencers are upswept, with the front cylinder's exhaust header routed beside the engine, in the manner of smaller enduro and dirt bikes. The one-piece plastic fuel tank is of relatively low capacity, and the seat is comparably tall at 920mm (36.22 inches).

With its six-speed transmission and stock wheels, the 950SE is capable of speeds in excess of 190 km/h (118 mph).

The 950SE is a powerful motorcycle. It lauded for its all-round performance and rider comfort, whether on- or off-pavement.

In his review of the 2008 model, motorcycle journalist Neil Johnson of OneWheelDrive, said, “the KTM 950 Super Enduro R is pure delightful lunacy.” The article's headline was sub-titled “The cure for common sense.”

Approximately 3,000 units were produced and sold internationally for model years 2006–2008. KTM discontinued the model in 2009.

The 950SE's 942cc engine, known as the LC-8, was designed by KTM engineers to power the company's 950 Factory Rally racer to compete in the 2002 Dakar Rally. In contrast to KTM's first LC-8-equipped consumer model, the 950 Adventure, modeled on the Dakar bike, the 950SE had higher ground clearance, a different steering head angle and rake, with a more-aggressive adjustable WP suspension, as well as the distinctive look and ride of an "oversized" enduro bike.

The 950SE can be ridden out of the city, onto the highway, and into challenging terrain such as water crossings, boulder fields, steep hill-climbs, single-track trails, rutted tracks, mudholes and deep sand, then rode home again at highway speed.

The 950 SE was the third consumer model to use the LC-8 engine after the KTM 950 Adventure and 950 Super Moto. It shares several components of the latter, but the SE was significantly-modified to suit its intended purpose.

== Origin ==
The 950SE is KTM's response to the BMW HP2, a well-regarded high-performance dirtbike whose 1170cc 'boxer' engine made 105-horsepower. The HP2 won its first competition start in 2005 at the Erzberg Rodeo in Styria, Austria, an annual "hard enduro" race series attracting hundreds of competitors from around the world. BMW's Motorrad Enduro Team Feil entered riders Simo Kirssi, Jimmy Lewis, and the winner of the previous year's Erzberg Hare Scramble, Chris Pfeiffer.

At the time, KTM was recovering after a long period of stagnation, with a mandate to dominate in the offroad racing sector. Many industry watchers believed KTM rushed its 950SE into production to demonstrate its "big bike" capabilities against its European rival.

Like the 950SE, the HP2 was a short-lived model, debuting in 2005 and discontinued in 2008.

== Launch ==
The new KTM 950 Super Enduro R was featured the 2006 EICMA Motor Show in Milan and won the Erzberg Rodeo race that May.

== Technical Issues ==
The 950SE is generally accepted as a robust offroad/trail motorcycle. However, it exhibits a number of weaknesses:

Sump guard: The factory sump guard is a lightweight pressed aluminium bash-plate. The majority of riders taking the 950SE offroad fit a heavyweight after-market version.

Voltage regulator/rectifier (VRR): The VRR is located under the seat, immediately behind the rear cylinder header pipe. In temperate climates, this causes few problems, but in hotter locations (southern USA, Australia, etc.), the combination of high temperatures coupled with the heat from the exhaust frequently causes the VRR to fail.

Oil tank: The oil tank is mounted at the front of the engine immediately behind the front wheel. In the event of a large impact in this area, it is possible for the oil tank to move up on its mounts, consequently bending the lower section of the radiator.

Rear sub-frame: The rear sub-frame has locating points for the attachment of the rear plastic fairing. Of these, two in particular (a threaded screw hole each side) form a weak point where, if sufficient load is applied to the rear of the rear sub-frame (such as carrying a heavy load on a luggage rack), a crack will propagate from the screw holes, eventually leading to failure of the frame. In an effort to prevent this failure, many owners weld aluminium supports to the frame to bolster the weak areas.

Fuel pump: In its original form, the OEM fuel pump has electro-mechanical points providing actuation of the fuel diaphragm. These eventually fail, although owners report differing time periods of just a few 1,000 km up to 30,000 km. The engine will run without a fuel pump, but only with a full fuel tank to provide sufficient head to the carburettors. Aftermarket fixes include replacement of the pump with a Facet pump, fitting a vacuum pump, or modifying the existing pump. A popular modification replaces the electro-mechanical points with an optical sensor and associated circuitry.

Since the 950SE shares some of the heritage from the KTM 950 Adventure series development (principally the LC8 engine/transmission unit), it suffers from similar issues:

Side-stand mounting: The side-stand mount bolts into the casting forming the lower section of the left side crankcase. In the event of a hard impact on the side-stand, a torsional load is passed to the crankcase... and it invariably fails. This potentially-expensive weakness is frequently-addressed by the fitting of an aftermarket side-stand relocating kit to remove the mount from the crankcase, and place it directly to the frame.

Clutch slave: The KTM 950/990 LC8 series engine uses a hydraulically actuated clutch system with conventional master and slave cylinders. The OEM slave (manufactured by Magura) has a failure mode in which the piston starts to tilt in the bore, causing the slave to fail. The 950SE suffers the same problem. It is generally-resolved by the fitting of an aftermarket slave unit; a popular choice is the Oberon slave cylinder manufactured in England. The failure occurs at any point; some owners report problems at 5,000 km, others reach 50,000 km.

== Cult following ==
After the KTM 950SE was released, it attracted limited interest. Dealers frequently had to offer considerable incentives to make initial sales. However, since approximately 2015, there is a marked increase in desirability with prices steadily rising to the point a good second-hand example changes hands for a price equal to or above the original manufacturers MSRP. The Erzberg Rodeo Editions, a limited production with enhanced graphics and other items such as Akrapovic exhausts, a CNC clutch cover, etc., fetch proportionally more. In Europe, the Erzberg bikes were individually-numbered denoted by a triangular badge on the top triple clamp. In the US, they were not numbered, hence, the number of Erzbergs produced is unknown, although the generally-accepted number is in the order of 100.

Because of the limited total production numbers (circa 3000 worldwide), the 950SE is not a common motorcycle, hence prospective buyers must generally be dedicated in searching examples for sale, further enhancing the desirability.

Various websites exist dedicated to the 950SE, notably www.950superenduro.com and a significant element of the ADVRider forums, specifically Orange Crush, Crazy Awesome Almost Dakar Racers 950/990

== Technical Data ==
Engine type: Twin cylinder, 4-stroke, V 75°

Displacement: 942 cc

Starter: Electric Start

Carburetor: 2 x Keihin constant-pressure carburetor, 43 mm

Control: DOHC

Lubrication: dry sump with 2 trochoidal pumps (pressure pump and suction pump

Engine lubrication: SAE 5W/40, 10W/50

Primary drive: 67:35

Final drive: 17:45

Cooling: Liquid-cooled

Clutch: Wet multi-disc clutch, operated hydraulically

Frame: Tubular chromoly space frame, powder-coated

Subframe: Aluminium 7020

Handlebar: Aluminium, conified

Front brake: 1x Brembo 2-piston floating caliper, floating brake disc Ø 300 mm (11.81")

Rear brake: Brembo 2-piston floating caliper, floating brake disc Ø 240 mm (9.45")

Rims: front / rear 1.85 x 21"; 2.50 x 18"

Tires: front / rear 90/90-21"; 140/80-18"

Battery: 12 V / 11.2 Ah

Main silencer: 2 x stainless steel with catalytic converter

Steering head angle: 64.4°

Ground clearance: (unloaded) 330 mm (13")

Weight: (no fuel) approx. 190 kg (419.4 lbs)

"Wet" Weight: approx. 204 kg (450 lbs)
