= 2021 Moto3 World Championship =

10th running of the Moto3 World Championship

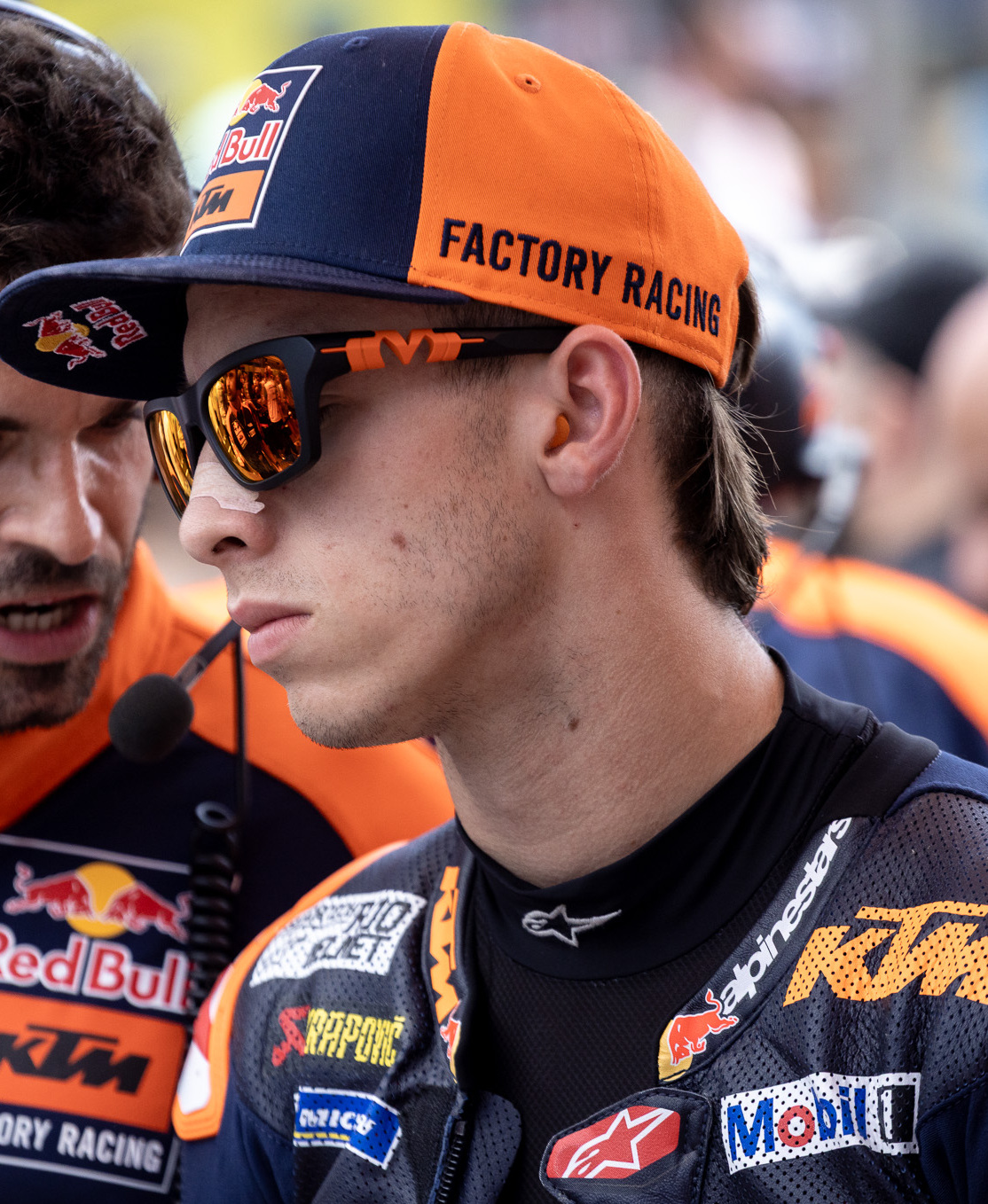
Pedro Acosta (pictured in 2025) was the 2021 Moto3 World Riders' Champion in his rookie season.

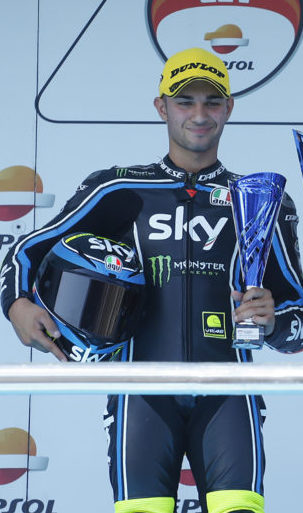
Dennis Foggia (pictured in 2017) finished runner-up.

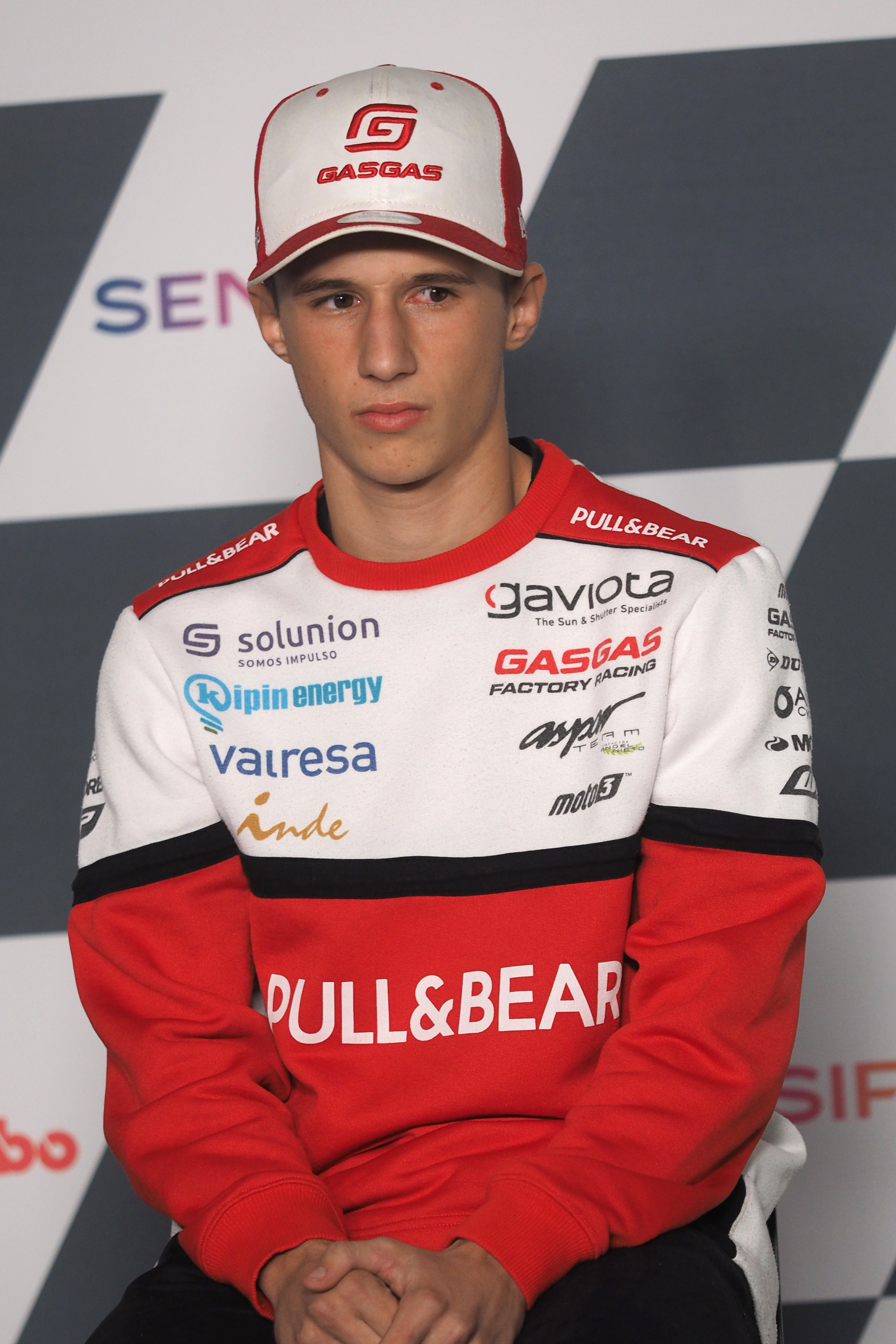
Sergio García finished third.

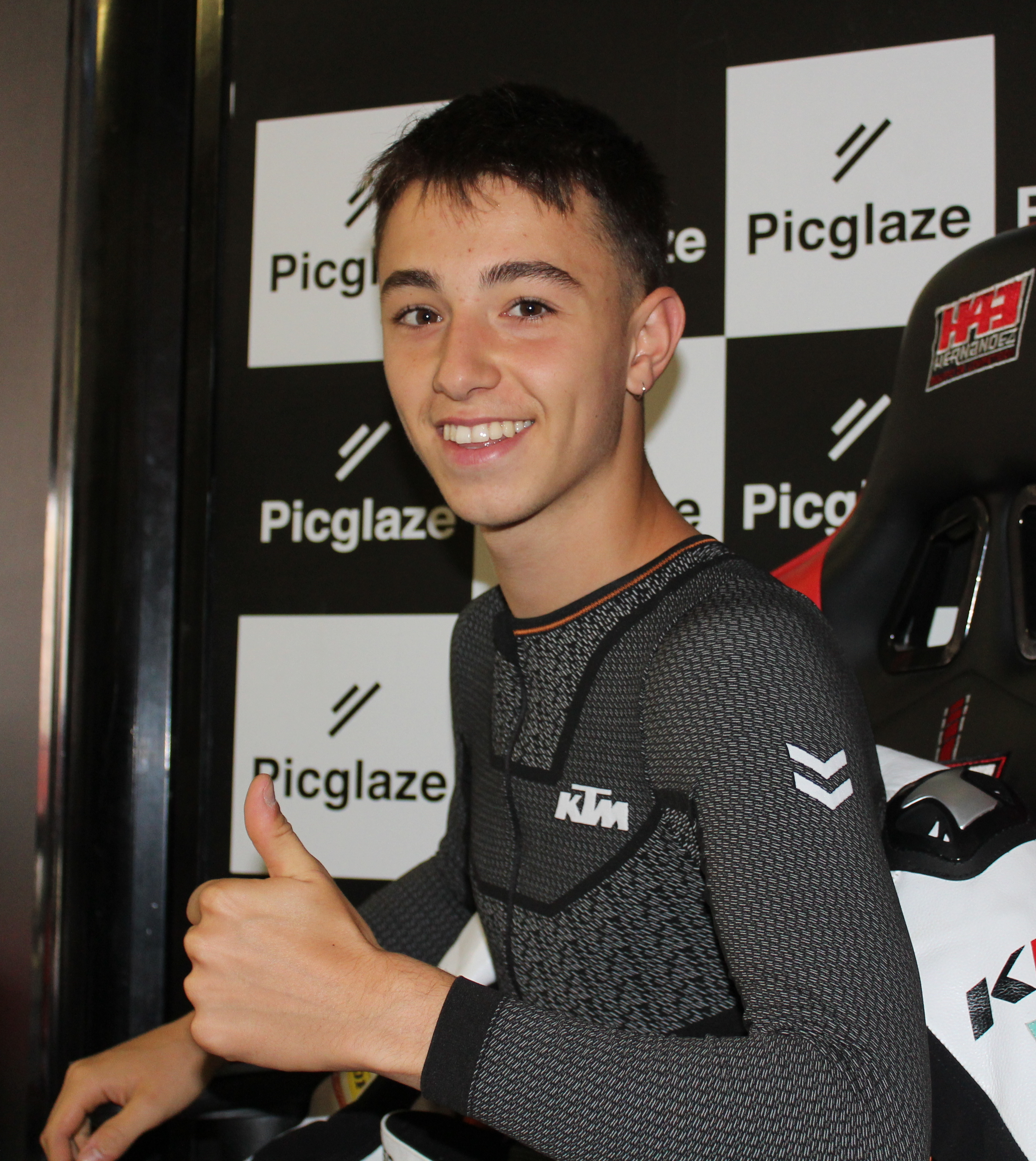
Jason Dupasquier (pictured in 2018) lost his life during the qualifying session of the Italian Grand Prix.

The 2021 FIM Moto3 World Championship was the lightweight class of the 73rd Fédération Internationale de Motocyclisme (FIM) Road Racing World Championship season. Pedro Acosta secured the 2021 championship with one race left in the season which was marred by the death of Jason Dupasquier during the second qualifying session of the Italian Grand Prix.

== Teams and riders ==
Team	Constructor	Motorcycle	No.	Rider	Rounds
(Spain) GasGas Gaviota Aspar (Spain) GasGas Valresa Aspar Team (Spain) Solunion GasGas Aspar Team (Spain) Gaviota GasGas Aspar Team (Spain) Santander Consumer GasGas (Spain) Valresa GasGas Aspar Team (Spain) MuchoNeumatico GasGas Aspar Team	GasGas	RC250GP	11	(Spain) Sergio García	1–15, 17–18
(Spain) GasGas Gaviota Aspar (Spain) GasGas Valresa Aspar Team (Spain) Solunion GasGas Aspar Team (Spain) Gaviota GasGas Aspar Team (Spain) Santander Consumer GasGas (Spain) Valresa GasGas Aspar Team (Spain) MuchoNeumatico GasGas Aspar Team	GasGas	RC250GP	80	(Colombia) David Alonso	16
(Spain) GasGas Gaviota Aspar (Spain) GasGas Valresa Aspar Team (Spain) Solunion GasGas Aspar Team (Spain) Gaviota GasGas Aspar Team (Spain) Santander Consumer GasGas (Spain) Valresa GasGas Aspar Team (Spain) MuchoNeumatico GasGas Aspar Team	GasGas	RC250GP	28	(Spain) Izan Guevara	All
(Japan) Honda Team Asia	Honda	NSF250RW	19	(Indonesia) Andi Farid Izdihar	1–11, 13–18
(Japan) Honda Team Asia	Honda	NSF250RW	92	(Japan) Yuki Kunii	1–5, 7–18
(Japan) Honda Team Asia	Honda	NSF250RW	32	(Japan) Takuma Matsuyama	6
(Japan) Honda Team Asia	Honda	NSF250RW	32	(Japan) Takuma Matsuyama	5, 7, 9
(Japan) Honda Team Asia	Honda	NSF250RW	64	(Indonesia) Mario Aji	16
(Italy) Indonesian Racing Gresini Moto3	Honda	NSF250RW	2	(Argentina) Gabriel Rodrigo	1–14, 17
(Italy) Indonesian Racing Gresini Moto3	Honda	NSF250RW	95	(Spain) José Antonio Rueda	18
(Italy) Indonesian Racing Gresini Moto3	Honda	NSF250RW	52	(Spain) Jeremy Alcoba	All
(Luxembourg) Leopard Racing (Luxembourg) Leopard Impala Junior Team	Honda	NSF250RW	7	(Italy) Dennis Foggia	All
(Luxembourg) Leopard Racing (Luxembourg) Leopard Impala Junior Team	Honda	NSF250RW	43	(Spain) Xavier Artigas	1–10, 12–18
(Malaysia) Petronas Sprinta Racing	Honda	NSF250RW	17	(United Kingdom) John McPhee	1–12, 14–18
(Malaysia) Petronas Sprinta Racing	Honda	NSF250RW	63	(Malaysia) Syarifuddin Azman	13
(Malaysia) Petronas Sprinta Racing	Honda	NSF250RW	40	(South Africa) Darryn Binder	All
(Italy) Rivacold Snipers Team	Honda	NSF250RW	12	(Czech Republic) Filip Salač	1–8
(Italy) Rivacold Snipers Team	Honda	NSF250RW	67	(Italy) Alberto Surra	9, 12–18
(Italy) Rivacold Snipers Team	Honda	NSF250RW	38	(Spain) David Salvador	10–11
(Italy) Rivacold Snipers Team	Honda	NSF250RW	16	(Italy) Andrea Migno	All
(Italy) Sic58 Squadra Corse	Honda	NSF250RW	20	(France) Lorenzo Fellon	All
(Italy) Sic58 Squadra Corse	Honda	NSF250RW	24	(Japan) Tatsuki Suzuki	All
(Italy) Sterilgarda Max Racing Team	Husqvarna	FR250GP	31	(Spain) Adrián Fernández	All
(Italy) Sterilgarda Max Racing Team	Husqvarna	FR250GP	55	(Italy) Romano Fenati	All
(Spain) Avintia Esponsorama Moto3 (Italy) Avintia VR46 (Italy) Avintia VR46 Academy	KTM	RC250GP	23	(Italy) Niccolò Antonelli	1–10, 12–18
(Spain) Avintia Esponsorama Moto3 (Italy) Avintia VR46 (Italy) Avintia VR46 Academy	KTM	RC250GP	22	(Italy) Elia Bartolini	11
(Spain) Avintia Esponsorama Moto3 (Italy) Avintia VR46 (Italy) Avintia VR46 Academy	KTM	RC250GP	99	(Spain) Carlos Tatay	1–6, 10–18
(Spain) Avintia Esponsorama Moto3 (Italy) Avintia VR46 (Italy) Avintia VR46 Academy	KTM	RC250GP	22	(Italy) Elia Bartolini	7–9
(Spain) Boé Owlride	KTM	RC250GP	54	(Italy) Riccardo Rossi	All
(Spain) Boé Owlride	KTM	RC250GP	82	(Italy) Stefano Nepa	All
(Germany) CarXpert Prüstel GP	KTM	RC250GP	6	(Japan) Ryusei Yamanaka	All
(Germany) CarXpert Prüstel GP	KTM	RC250GP	50	(Switzerland) Jason Dupasquier	1–6
(Germany) CarXpert Prüstel GP	KTM	RC250GP	12	(Czech Republic) Filip Salač	10–18
(France) CIP Green Power	KTM	RC250GP	27	(Japan) Kaito Toba	All
(France) CIP Green Power	KTM	RC250GP	73	(Austria) Maximilian Kofler	1–6, 10–16
(France) CIP Green Power	KTM	RC250GP	96	(Spain) Daniel Holgado	7
(France) CIP Green Power	KTM	RC250GP	66	(Australia) Joel Kelso	8–9, 17–18
(Finland) Red Bull KTM Ajo	KTM	RC250GP	5	(Spain) Jaume Masià	All
(Finland) Red Bull KTM Ajo	KTM	RC250GP	37	(Spain) Pedro Acosta	All
(France) Red Bull KTM Tech3	KTM	RC250GP	53	(Turkey) Deniz Öncü	1–15, 18
(France) Red Bull KTM Tech3	KTM	RC250GP	96	(Spain) Daniel Holgado	16–17
(France) Red Bull KTM Tech3	KTM	RC250GP	71	(Japan) Ayumu Sasaki	1–7, 10–18
(Italy) Team Bardahl VR46 Riders Academy	KTM	RC250GP	22	(Italy) Elia Bartolini	6, 14
(Italy) Team Bardahl VR46 Riders Academy	KTM	RC250GP	67	(Italy) Alberto Surra	6
(Italy) Team Bardahl VR46 Riders Academy	KTM	RC250GP	18	(Italy) Matteo Bertelle	14

Key
Regular rider
Replacement rider
Wildcard rider

All teams used series-specified Dunlop tyres.

=== Team changes ===
- GasGas entered the championship with Aspar Team, who had previously used KTM motorcycles.
- Estrella Galicia 0,0 and Sky Racing Team VR46 withdrew from Moto3.
- Avintia Esponsorama Racing expanded to two riders.

=== Rider changes ===
- Darryn Binder joined Petronas Sprinta Racing, replacing Khairul Idham Pawi. He is replaced by Kaito Toba.
- Jaume Masià joined Red Bull KTM Ajo.
- 2020 Red Bull MotoGP Rookies Cup World Champion Pedro Acosta made his full season debut with Red Bull KTM Ajo.
- Raúl Fernández moves up to Moto2 with the same team.
- Andrea Migno joined Rivacold Snipers Team, replacing Celestino Vietti who moved up to Moto2 with the same team.
- Sergio García joined Aspar Team, replacing Albert Arenas who moved up to Moto2 with the same team.
- 2020 FIM CEV Moto3 Junior World Champion Izan Guevara made his full season debut with Aspar Team, replacing Stefano Nepa.
- Ryusei Yamanaka joined CarXpert Prüstel GP, replacing Barry Baltus who moved up to Moto2 with NTS RW Racing GP.
- Andi Farid Izdihar joined Moto3 with Honda Team Asia, replacing Ai Ogura who moved up to Moto2 with the same team.

==== Mid-season changes ====
- Takuma Matsuyama replaced Yuki Kunii for the Italian round because of a broken collarbone.
- Jason Dupasquier died after an accident during the second qualifying session at the Italian Grand Prix.
- Elia Bartolini replaced Carlos Tatay for the Catalan and German rounds because of an injury.
- Daniel Holgado replaced Maximilian Kofler for the Catalan round because of a fractured vertebrae.
- Joel Kelso replaced Maximilian Kofler for the German round as he continued to recover from a fractured vertebrae.
- Filip Salač and Rivacold Snipers Team mutually ended their relationship following the German Grand Prix. He was replaced by Alberto Surra for the remainder of the season. Salač subsequently moved to CarXpert Prüstel GP to replace the late Jason Dupasquier, starting from the Styrian round.
- Xavier Artigas missed the Austrian round after testing positive for COVID-19 a week prior during the Styrian Grand Prix.
- Alberto Surra missed both Austria races due to physical problems and was replaced by David Salvador.
- Niccolò Antonelli missed the Austrian round after sustaining injuries during qualifying of the Styrian Grand Prix. He was replaced by Elia Bartolini.
- Andi Farid Izdihar missed the British round after having issues with his visa. He was not replaced.
- Syarifuddin Azman replaced John McPhee during the Aragon Grand Prix. McPhee served as a replacement in the Moto2 class for Jake Dixon, who in turn replaced the injured Franco Morbidelli in the MotoGP class.
- Gabriel Rodrigo missed the Americas and Emilia Romagna Grands Prix due to a shoulder injury sustained in a test. He was not replaced for both rounds.
- Deniz Öncü was given a double race ban for both the Emilia Romagna and the Algarve Grands Prix after causing an accident involving three riders during race 2 of the Americas Grand Prix. He was replaced by Daniel Holgado for both the Emilia Romagna and Algarve rounds.
- Sergio García missed the Emilia Romagna round after suffering a kidney hematoma from the a crash during a free practice session of the Americas round. He was replaced by David Alonso for the round.

== Calendar ==
The following Grands Prix took place in 2021:

Round	Date	Grand Prix	Circuit
1	28 March (Note: Night race)	Barwa Grand Prix of Qatar	Lusail International Circuit, Lusail
2	4 April	(Qatar) Tissot Grand Prix of Doha	Lusail International Circuit, Lusail
3	18 April	Grande Prémio 888 de Portugal	Algarve International Circuit, Portimão
4	2 May	(Spain) Gran Premio Red Bull de España	Circuito de Jerez, Jerez de la Frontera
5	16 May	Shark Grand Prix de France	Bugatti Circuit, Le Mans
6	30 May	(Italy) Gran Premio d'Italia Oakley	Mugello Circuit, Scarperia e San Piero
7	6 June	(Catalonia) Gran Premi Monster Energy de Catalunya	Circuit de Barcelona-Catalunya, Montmeló
8	20 June	(Germany) Liqui Moly Motorrad Grand Prix Deutschland	Sachsenring, Hohenstein-Ernstthal
9	27 June	(Netherlands) Motul TT Assen	TT Circuit Assen, Assen
10	8 August	Michelin Grand Prix of Styria	Red Bull Ring, Spielberg
11	15 August	(Austria) Bitci Motorrad Grand Prix von Österreich	Red Bull Ring, Spielberg
12	29 August	(United Kingdom) Monster Energy British Grand Prix	Silverstone Circuit, Silverstone
13	12 September	(Aragon) Gran Premio Tissot de Aragón	MotorLand Aragón, Alcañiz
14	19 September	Gran Premio Octo di San Marino e della Riviera di Rimini	Misano World Circuit, Misano Adriatico
15	3 October	(United States) Red Bull Grand Prix of the Americas	Circuit of the Americas, Austin
16	24 October	Gran Premio Nolan del Made in Italy e dell'Emilia-Romagna	Misano World Circuit, Misano Adriatico
17	7 November	(Portugal) Grande Prémio Brembo do Algarve	Algarve International Circuit, Portimão
18	14 November	(Valencian Community) Gran Premio Motul de la Comunitat Valenciana	Circuit Ricardo Tormo, Valencia
Cancelled Grands Prix
-	~~11 April~~	(Argentina) Argentine Republic motorcycle Grand Prix	Autódromo Termas de Río Hondo, Termas de Río Hondo
-	~~11 July~~	(Finland) Finnish motorcycle Grand Prix	Kymi Ring, Iitti
-	~~3 October~~	(Japan) Japanese motorcycle Grand Prix	Motegi Circuit, Motegi
-	~~17 October~~	Thailand motorcycle Grand Prix	Buriram International Circuit, Buriram
-	~~24 October~~	(Australia) Australian motorcycle Grand Prix	Phillip Island Grand Prix Circuit, Phillip Island
-	~~24 October~~	(Malaysia) Malaysian motorcycle Grand Prix	Sepang International Circuit, Sepang

=== Grand Prix locations ===
Location of non-European Grands Prix in 2021.
(scheduled Grand Prix: cancelled Grand Prix)
Location of European Grands Prix in 2021.
(scheduled Grand Prix: cancelled Grand Prix)

=== Calendar changes ===
- The Finnish Grand Prix was due to be reintroduced to the calendar after a 38-year absence. The venue hosting the round was to be the new Kymi Ring, instead of the Pyynikki Circuit used in 1962 and 1963, or the Imatra Circuit which hosted the round until 1982. The Finnish Grand Prix had been included on the 2020 calendar, but the inaugural race was cancelled in response to the COVID-19 pandemic.
- The Czech Republic Grand Prix was initially left off the provisional calendar, as the circuit requires mandatory resurfacing for safety compliance, and it was unclear if the necessary work could be completed in time for its typical schedule date in early August. The 11th round of the championship was therefore left open as provisionally pending. On 8 December 2020, Brno city councillors opted out of the 2021 calendar, citing financial difficulties due to the COVID-19 pandemic. It marked the first absence of a Grand Prix in Brno since 1992. The mayor of Brno hopes for the return of the championship in 2022.

==== Calendar changes as a reaction to COVID-19 pandemic ====
- With the uncertainty of the development of the COVID-19 pandemic, championship organizer Dorna elected in November 2020 to nominate three "Reserve Grand Prix Venues" which could be used in the event that local virus containment measures or regulations force the cancellation of a planned Grand Prix.
  - The Portuguese Grand Prix at Algarve had previously returned to the schedule as a replacement race for the final round of the COVID-19 shortened 2020 season.
  - The Indonesian Grand Prix was originally planned to be reintroduced to the main calendar after a 23-year absence before being designated a Reserve Grand Prix for 2021. The venue hosting the round would be the new Mandalika International Street Circuit, instead of the Sentul International Circuit used in 1996 and 1997.
  - A Russian Grand Prix would see the inaugural motorcycle Grand Prix in that country. The Igora Drive circuit would be used.
- On 22 January 2021, Dorna significantly updated the provisional calendar including the following changes:
  - The Argentine and American Grands Prix would be postponed due to the COVID-19 situation in both countries, with potential rescheduling for the final quarter of 2021.
  - A double-header would open the season in Qatar on 28 March and 4 April, followed by Portugal as the third round.
  - The provisionally pending race created by the absence of the Czech Grand Prix was removed.
  - The potential Russian Grand Prix was removed from the reserve list, leaving Indonesia as the sole Reserve Grand Prix Venue.
- On 14 May the Finnish Grand Prix was cancelled due to the COVID-19 situation, and the Styrian Grand Prix would replace it on the date of 8 August. It was also confirmed that the Indonesian Grand Prix would remain a reserve Grand Prix in the 2021 calendar, subject to circuit homologation.
- On 23 June the Japanese Grand Prix was cancelled due to the COVID-19 situation, with the previously postponed Grand Prix of the Americas taking its place in the calendar. This also led to the postponement of the Thailand Grand Prix by one week.
- On 6 July the Australian Grand Prix was cancelled due to the COVID-19 situation, with the Malaysian Grand Prix brought forward by a week to replace it on the date of 24 October. In addition, a new Grand Prix, the Algarve Grand Prix, was introduced, which is scheduled to be held on 7 November.
- On 21 July the Thailand Grand Prix was cancelled due to the COVID-19 restrictions in the country.
- On 19 August the Malaysian Grand Prix was cancelled due to the COVID-19 restrictions in the country. For its replacement, a second Grand Prix at Misano was introduced, having the same schedule as the cancelled Malaysian round.
- On 11 September the final championship calendar comprising 18 Grands Prix was confirmed. The Emilia Romagna and Rimini Riviera Grand Prix returned as the second Grand Prix at Misano, now having the shortened name of Emilia Romagna Grand Prix. The previously postponed Argentine Grand Prix was also cancelled.

== Results and standings ==
=== Grands Prix ===
Round	Grand Prix	Pole position	Fastest lap	Winning rider	Winning team	Winning constructor	Report
1	Qatar motorcycle Grand Prix	(South Africa) Darryn Binder	(Spain) Xavier Artigas	(Spain) Jaume Masià	(Finland) Red Bull KTM Ajo	(Austria) KTM	Report
2	(Qatar) Doha motorcycle Grand Prix	(Spain) Jaume Masià	(Italy) Stefano Nepa	(Spain) Pedro Acosta	(Finland) Red Bull KTM Ajo	(Austria) KTM	Report
3	(Portugal) Portuguese motorcycle Grand Prix	(Italy) Andrea Migno	(Argentina) Gabriel Rodrigo	(Spain) Pedro Acosta	(Finland) Red Bull KTM Ajo	(Austria) KTM	Report
4	(Spain) Spanish motorcycle Grand Prix	(Japan) Tatsuki Suzuki	(Spain) Izan Guevara	(Spain) Pedro Acosta	(Finland) Red Bull KTM Ajo	(Austria) KTM	Report
5	(France) French motorcycle Grand Prix	(Italy) Andrea Migno	(Italy) Riccardo Rossi	(Spain) Sergio García	(Spain) Gaviota GasGas Aspar Team	(Spain) GasGas	Report
6	(Italy) Italian motorcycle Grand Prix	(Japan) Tatsuki Suzuki	(Spain) Sergio García	(Italy) Dennis Foggia	(Luxembourg) Leopard Racing	(Japan) Honda	Report
7	(Catalonia) Catalan motorcycle Grand Prix	(Argentina) Gabriel Rodrigo	(South Africa) Darryn Binder	(Spain) Sergio García	(Spain) Solunion GasGas Aspar Team	(Spain) GasGas	Report
8	(Germany) German motorcycle Grand Prix	(Czech Republic) Filip Salač	(Spain) Jaume Masià	(Spain) Pedro Acosta	(Finland) Red Bull KTM Ajo	(Austria) KTM	Report
9	(Netherlands) Dutch TT	(Spain) Jeremy Alcoba	(Spain) Pedro Acosta	(Italy) Dennis Foggia	(Luxembourg) Leopard Racing	(Japan) Honda	Report
10	(Styria) Styrian motorcycle Grand Prix	(Turkey) Deniz Öncü (Note: Deniz Öncü set the fastest time in qualifying, but was required to start of race at the back of the grid as his mechanics were still working on his bike at the three minute board. Pole position was left vacant on the grid. Sergio García, in the second slot, was the first rider on the grid. Öncü is still considered to have held pole position.)	(South Africa) Darryn Binder	(Spain) Pedro Acosta	(Finland) Red Bull KTM Ajo	(Austria) KTM	Report
11	(Austria) Austrian motorcycle Grand Prix	(Italy) Romano Fenati	(Spain) Izan Guevara	(Spain) Sergio García	(Spain) Santander Consumer GasGas	(Spain) GasGas	Report
12	(United Kingdom) British motorcycle Grand Prix	(Italy) Romano Fenati	(Spain) Izan Guevara	(Italy) Romano Fenati	(Italy) Sterilgarda Max Racing Team	(Sweden) Husqvarna	Report
13	Aragon motorcycle Grand Prix	(South Africa) Darryn Binder	(Spain) Izan Guevara	(Italy) Dennis Foggia	(Luxembourg) Leopard Racing	(Japan) Honda	Report
14	San Marino and Rimini Riviera motorcycle Grand Prix	(Italy) Romano Fenati	(Italy) Romano Fenati	(Italy) Dennis Foggia	(Luxembourg) Leopard Racing	(Japan) Honda	Report
15	(United States) Motorcycle Grand Prix of the Americas	(Spain) Jaume Masià	(Japan) Tatsuki Suzuki	(Spain) Izan Guevara	(Spain) Solunion GasGas Aspar Team	(Spain) GasGas	Report
16	(Emilia-Romagna) Emilia Romagna motorcycle Grand Prix	(Italy) Niccolò Antonelli	(Italy) Andrea Migno	(Italy) Dennis Foggia	(Luxembourg) Leopard Racing	(Japan) Honda	Report
17	(Portugal) Algarve motorcycle Grand Prix	(Spain) Sergio García	(Spain) Jaume Masià	(Spain) Pedro Acosta	(Finland) Red Bull KTM Ajo	(Austria) KTM	Report
18	Valencian Community motorcycle Grand Prix	(Spain) Pedro Acosta	(Spain) Xavier Artigas	(Spain) Xavier Artigas	(Luxembourg) Leopard Racing	(Japan) Honda	Report

=== Riders' standings ===
Scoring system

Points were awarded to the top fifteen finishers. A rider had to finish the race to earn points.

Position	1st	2nd	3rd	4th	5th	6th	7th	8th	9th	10th	11th	12th	13th	14th	15th
Points	25	20	16	13	11	10	9	8	7	6	5	4	3	2	1

Pos.	Rider	Bike	Team	QAT (Qatar)	DOH (Qatar)	POR (Portugal)	SPA (Spain)	FRA (France)	ITA (Italy)	CAT (Catalonia)	GER (Germany)	NED (Netherlands)	STY (Styria)	AUT (Austria)	GBR (United Kingdom)	ARA (Aragon)	RSM (San Marino)	AME (United States)	EMI (Emilia-Romagna)	ALR (Portugal)	VAL (Valencian Community)	Pts
1	(Spain) Pedro Acosta	KTM	Red Bull KTM Ajo	2	1	1	1	8	8	7	1	4^{F}	1	4	11	Ret	7	8	3	1	Ret^{P}	259
2	(Italy) Dennis Foggia	Honda	Leopard Racing	Ret	17	2	Ret	18	1	Ret	3	1	22	3	3	1	1	2	1	Ret	13	216
3	(Spain) Sergio García	GasGas	Valresa GasGas Aspar Team	4	23	8	13	1	9^{F}	1	7	2	2	1	16	18	4	DNS		Ret^{P}	2	188
4	(Spain) Jaume Masià	KTM	Red Bull KTM Ajo	1	9^{P}	9	21	Ret	2	4	Ret^{F}	20	4	6	6	10	5	4^{P}	2	19^{F}	3	171
5	(Italy) Romano Fenati	Husqvarna	Sterligarda Max Racing Team	11	10	7	2	10	6	11	13	3	3	5^{P}	1^{P}	14	Ret^{P F}	12	7	7	12	160
6	(Italy) Niccolò Antonelli	KTM	Avintia VR46 Academy	6	3	6	8	Ret	13	8	6	14	DNS		2	5	2	15	6^{P}	3	9	152
7	(South Africa) Darryn Binder	Honda	Petronas Sprinta Racing	3^{P}	2	20	22	20	5	5^{F}	14	7	6^{F}	9	7	7^{P}	6	7	4	DSQ	Ret	136
8	(Spain) Izan Guevara	GasGas	Valresa GasGas Aspar Team	7	6	24	11^{F}	14	17	Ret	10	12	14	8^{F}	4^{F}	4^{F}	12	1	12	5	7	125
9	(Japan) Ayumu Sasaki	KTM	Red Bull KTM Tech3	Ret	7	4	5	5	4	Ret			5	Ret	13	3	10	13	8	6	10	120
10	(Italy) Andrea Migno	Honda	Rivacold Snipers Team	Ret	4	3^{P}	4	11^{P}	Ret	Ret	5	Ret	17	Ret	Ret	6	3	10	Ret^{F}	2	18	110
11	(Turkey) Deniz Öncü	KTM	Red Bull KTM Tech3	20	18	15	20	9	Ret	3	16	15	21^{P}	2	8	2	21	5			5	95
12	(Spain) Jeremy Alcoba	Honda	Indonesian Racing Gresini Moto3	Ret	Ret	14	3	22	15	2	4	10^{P}	18	14	21	Ret	16	6	14	4	15	86
13	(United Kingdom) John McPhee	Honda	Petronas Sprinta Racing	Ret	Ret	23	Ret	4	7	Ret	11	6	13	7	12		13	3	Ret	Ret	11	77
14	(Japan) Tatsuki Suzuki	Honda	Sic58 Squadra Corse	8	12	Ret	Ret^{P}	Ret	10^{P}	Ret	8	5	15	11	5	9	15	9^{F}	Ret	9	Ret	76
15	(Spain) Xavier Artigas	Honda	Leopard Racing	Ret^{F}	Ret	Ret	9	7	16	Ret	9	9	DNS		18	Ret	Ret	14	9	8	1^{F}	72
16	(Czech Republic) Filip Salač	Honda	Rivacold Snipers Team	13	Ret	13	12	2	11	Ret	Ret^{P}											71
16	(Czech Republic) Filip Salač	KTM	CarXpert Prüstel GP										11	12	14	Ret	Ret	Ret	10	10	4	71
17	(Japan) Kaito Toba	KTM	CIP Green Power	9	5	NC	16	21	12	9	2	13	12	10	Ret	16	14	23	17	NC	17	64
18	(Italy) Stefano Nepa	KTM	Boé Owlride	18	16^{F}	11	15	17	14	10	Ret	11	19	13	17	8	9	11	5	16	6	63
19	(Argentina) Gabriel Rodrigo	Honda	Indonesian Racing Gresini Moto3	5	13	5^{F}	Ret	Ret	3	6^{P}	Ret	8	20	20	15	Ret	DNS			DNS		60
20	(Japan) Ryusei Yamanaka	KTM	CarXpert Prüstel GP	14	8	10	10	12	DNS	14	18	17	7	DNS	23	11	17	22	11	21	19	47
21	(Spain) Carlos Tatay	KTM	Avintia Esponsorama Moto3	12	21	17	6	Ret	Ret				DNS	16	10	Ret	8	18	Ret	12	8	40
22	(Spain) Adrián Fernández	Husqvarna	Sterilgarda Max Racing Team	17	Ret	Ret	24	6	Ret	Ret	Ret	Ret	10	Ret	19	12	20	21	13	11	14	30
23	(Italy) Riccardo Rossi	KTM	Boé Owlride	Ret	19	19	17	3^{F}	18	DNS	Ret	18	23	19	9	15	11	20	Ret	18	16	29
24	(Switzerland) Jason Dupasquier^{†}	KTM	CarXpert Prüstel GP	10	11	12	7	13	DNS													27
25	(Japan) Yuki Kunii	Honda	Honda Team Asia	16	15	16	14	DNS		12	Ret	23	8	18	24	17	EX	25	Ret	20	Ret	15
26	(Austria) Maximilian Kofler	KTM	CIP Green Power	15	14	21	19	16	Ret				9	22	25	19	22	17	18			10
27	(Italy) Elia Bartolini	KTM	Team Bardahl VR46 Riders Academy						20								Ret					7
27	(Italy) Elia Bartolini	KTM	Avintia VR46							13	12	16		23								7
28	(Spain) Daniel Holgado	KTM	CIP Green Power							15												4
28	(Spain) Daniel Holgado	KTM	Red Bull KTM Tech3																20	13		4
29	(Indonesia) Andi Farid Izdihar	Honda	Honda Team Asia	21	22	18	18	15	21	17	15	24	Ret	15		20	24	24	15	22	DNS	4
30	(Malaysia) Syarifuddin Azman	Honda	Petronas Sprinta Racing													13						3
31	(Australia) Joel Kelso	KTM	CIP Green Power								17	22								14	Ret	2
32	(Italy) Alberto Surra	KTM	Team Bardahl VR46 Riders Academy						Ret													1
32	(Italy) Alberto Surra	Honda	Rivacold Snipers Team									19			20	21	23	19	16	15	Ret	1
33	(France) Lorenzo Fellon	Honda	Sic58 Squadra Corse	19	20	22	23	19	19	16	Ret	21	16	17	22	Ret	19	16	19	17	Ret	0
34	(Japan) Takuma Matsuyama	Honda	Honda Team Asia					Ret	22	18		25										0
35	(Italy) Matteo Bertelle	KTM	Team Bardahl VR46 Riders Academy														18					0
36	(Indonesia) Mario Aji	Honda	Honda Team Asia																21			0
37	(Spain) David Salvador	Honda	Rivacold Snipers Team										Ret	21								0
38	(Colombia) David Alonso	GasGas	Gaviota GasGas Aspar Team																22			0
	(Spain) José Antonio Rueda	Honda	Indonesian Racing Gresini Moto3																		Ret	0
Pos.	Rider	Bike	Team	QAT (Qatar)	DOH (Qatar)	POR (Portugal)	SPA (Spain)	FRA (France)	ITA (Italy)	CAT (Catalonia)	GER (Germany)	NED (Netherlands)	STY (Styria)	AUT (Austria)	GBR (United Kingdom)	ARA (Aragon)	RSM (San Marino)	AME (United States)	EMI (Emilia-Romagna)	ALR (Portugal)	VAL (Valencian Community)	Pts

Race key
Colour	Result
Gold	Winner
Silver	2nd place
Bronze	3rd place
Green	Points finish
Blue	Non-points finish
Blue	Non-classified finish (NC)
Purple	Retired (Ret)
Red	Did not qualify (DNQ)
Black	Disqualified (DSQ)
White	Did not start (DNS)
White	Withdrew (WD)
White	Race cancelled (C)
Blank	Did not practice (DNP)
Blank	Excluded (EX)
Blank	Did not arrive (DNA)
Blank	Did not enter (empty cell)
Annotation	Meaning
P	Pole position
F	Fastest lap
Rider key
Colour	Meaning
Light blue	Rookie rider

† – Rider deceased

=== Constructors' standings ===
Each constructor got the same number of points as their best placed rider in each race.

Pos.	Constructor	QAT (Qatar)	DOH (Qatar)	POR (Portugal)	SPA (Spain)	FRA (France)	ITA (Italy)	CAT (Catalonia)	GER (Germany)	NED (Netherlands)	STY (Styria)	AUT (Austria)	GBR (United Kingdom)	ARA (Aragon)	RSM (San Marino)	AME (United States)	EMI (Emilia-Romagna)	ALR (Portugal)	VAL (Valencian Community)	Pts
1	(Austria) KTM	1	1	1	1	3	2	3	1	4	1	2	2	2	2	4	2	1	3	369
2	(Japan) Honda	3	2	2	3	2	1	2	3	1	6	3	3	1	1	2	1	2	1	360
3	(Spain) GasGas	4	6	8	11	1	9	1	7	2	2	1	4	4	4	1	12	5	2	266
4	(Sweden) Husqvarna	11	10	7	2	6	6	11	13	3	3	5	1	12	20	12	7	7	12	166
Pos.	Constructor	QAT (Qatar)	DOH (Qatar)	POR (Portugal)	SPA (Spain)	FRA (France)	ITA (Italy)	CAT (Catalonia)	GER (Germany)	NED (Netherlands)	STY (Styria)	AUT (Austria)	GBR (United Kingdom)	ARA (Aragon)	RSM (San Marino)	AME (United States)	EMI (Emilia-Romagna)	ALR (Portugal)	VAL (Valencian Community)	Pts

=== Teams' standings ===
The teams' standings were based on results obtained by regular and substitute riders; wild-card entries were ineligible.

Pos.	Team	Bike No.	QAT (Qatar)	DOH (Qatar)	POR (Portugal)	SPA (Spain)	FRA (France)	ITA (Italy)	CAT (Catalonia)	GER (Germany)	NED (Netherlands)	STY (Styria)	AUT (Austria)	GBR (United Kingdom)	ARA (Aragon)	RSM (San Marino)	AME (United States)	EMI (Emilia-Romagna)	ALR (Portugal)	VAL (Valencian Community)	Pts
1	(Finland) Red Bull KTM Ajo	5	1	9^{P}	9	21	Ret	2	4	Ret^{F}	20	4	6	6	10	5	4^{P}	2	19^{F}	3	430
1	(Finland) Red Bull KTM Ajo	37	2	1	1	1	8	8	7	1	4^{F}	1	4	11	Ret	7	8	3	1	Ret^{P}	430
2	(Spain) Valresa GasGas Aspar Team	11	4	23	8	13	1	9^{F}	1	7	2	2	1	16	18	4	DNS		Ret^{P}	2	313
2	(Spain) Valresa GasGas Aspar Team	28	7	6	24	11^{F}	14	17	Ret	10	12	14	8^{F}	4^{F}	4^{F}	12	1	12	5	7	313
2	(Spain) Valresa GasGas Aspar Team	80																22			313
3	(Luxembourg) Leopard Racing	7	Ret	17	2	Ret	18	1	Ret	3	1	22	3	3	1	1	2	1	Ret	13	288
3	(Luxembourg) Leopard Racing	43	Ret^{F}	Ret	Ret	9	7	16	Ret	9	9	DNS		18	Ret	Ret	14	9	8	1^{F}	288
4	(France) Red Bull KTM Tech3	53	20	18	15	20	9	Ret	3	16	15	21^{P}	2	8	2	21	5			5	218
4	(France) Red Bull KTM Tech3	71	Ret	7	4	5	5	4	Ret			5	Ret	13	3	10	13	8	6	10	218
4	(France) Red Bull KTM Tech3	96																20	13		218
5	(Malaysia) Petronas Sprinta Racing	17	Ret	Ret	23	Ret	4	7	Ret	11	6	13	7	12		13	3	Ret	Ret	11	216
5	(Malaysia) Petronas Sprinta Racing	40	3^{P}	2	20	22	20	5	5^{F}	14	7	6^{F}	9	7	7^{P}	6	7	4	DSQ	Ret	216
5	(Malaysia) Petronas Sprinta Racing	63													13						216
6	(Spain) Avintia Esponsorama Moto3	22							13	12	16		23								199
6	(Spain) Avintia Esponsorama Moto3	23	6	3	6	8	Ret	13	8	6	14	DNS		2	5	2	15	6^{P}	3	9	199
6	(Spain) Avintia Esponsorama Moto3	99	12	21	17	6	Ret	Ret				DNS	16	10	Ret	8	18	Ret	12	8	199
7	(Italy) Sterilgarda Max Racing Team	31	17	Ret	Ret	24	6	Ret	Ret	Ret	Ret	10	Ret	19	12	20	21	13	11	14	190
7	(Italy) Sterilgarda Max Racing Team	55	11	10	7	2	10	6	11	13	3	3	5^{P}	1^{P}	14	Ret^{P F}	12	7	7	12	190
8	(Italy) Indonesian Racing Gresini Moto3	2	5	13	5^{F}	Ret	Ret	3	6^{P}	Ret	8	20	20	15	Ret	DNS			DNS		146
8	(Italy) Indonesian Racing Gresini Moto3	52	Ret	Ret	14	3	22	15	2	4	10^{P}	18	14	21	Ret	16	6	14	4	15	146
8	(Italy) Indonesian Racing Gresini Moto3	95																		Ret	146
9	(Italy) Rivacold Snipers Team	12	13	Ret	13	12	2	11	Ret	Ret^{P}											146
9	(Italy) Rivacold Snipers Team	16	Ret	4	3^{P}	4	11^{P}	Ret	Ret	5	Ret	17	Ret	Ret	6	3	10	Ret^{F}	2	18	146
9	(Italy) Rivacold Snipers Team	38										Ret	21								146
9	(Italy) Rivacold Snipers Team	67									19			20	21	23	19	16	15	Ret	146
10	(Germany) CarXpert Prüstel GP	6	14	8	10	10	12	DNS	14	18	17	7	DNS	23	11	17	22	11	21	19	110
10	(Germany) CarXpert Prüstel GP	12										11	12	14	Ret	Ret	Ret	10	10	4	110
10	(Germany) CarXpert Prüstel GP	50	10	11	12	7	13	DNS													110
11	(Spain) Boé Owlride	54	Ret	19	19	17	3^{F}	18	DNS	Ret	18	23	19	9	15	11	20	Ret	18	16	92
11	(Spain) Boé Owlride	82	18	16^{F}	11	15	17	14	10	Ret	11	19	13	17	8	9	11	5	16	6	92
12	(France) CIP Green Power	27	9	5	NC	16	21	12	9	2	13	12	10	Ret	16	14	23	17	NC	17	77
12	(France) CIP Green Power	66								17	22								14	Ret	77
12	(France) CIP Green Power	73	15	14	21	19	16	Ret				9	22	25	19	22	17	18			77
12	(France) CIP Green Power	96							15												77
13	(Italy) Sic58 Squadra Corse	20	19	20	22	23	19	19	16	Ret	21	16	17	22	Ret	19	16	19	17	Ret	76
13	(Italy) Sic58 Squadra Corse	24	8	12	Ret	Ret^{P}	Ret	10^{P}	Ret	8	5	15	11	5	9	15	9^{F}	Ret	9	Ret	76
14	(Japan) Honda Team Asia	19	21	22	18	18	15	21	17	15	24	Ret	15		20	24	24	15	22	DNS	19
14	(Japan) Honda Team Asia	32						22													19
14	(Japan) Honda Team Asia	92	16	15	16	14	DNS		12	Ret	23	8	18	24	17	EX	25	Ret	20	Ret	19
Pos.	Team	Bike No.	QAT (Qatar)	DOH (Qatar)	POR (Portugal)	SPA (Spain)	FRA (France)	ITA (Italy)	CAT (Catalonia)	GER (Germany)	NED (Netherlands)	STY (Styria)	AUT (Austria)	GBR (United Kingdom)	ARA (Aragon)	RSM (San Marino)	AME (United States)	EMI (Emilia-Romagna)	ALR (Portugal)	VAL (Valencian Community)	Pts
