= Motorcycle Stability Control =

Motorcycle Stability Control (MSC) is a motorcycle electronic brake control system developed by Robert Bosch GmbH. It is a lean-sensitive variation of the traditional ABS system Anti-lock braking system.

== Overview ==
The MSC system uses accelerometers and/or gyroscopic sensors to evaluate how close to the limit of adhesion the motorcycle is cornering. It reduces the allowable braking tire slip ratio, reducing the braking force, thus preventing the tire skid, and keeping the motorcycle from falling into the turn, or low-siding.

Unlike the automotive Electronic stability control, the MSC engages only if the rider is using the brakes. The system redistributes the total force generated by the tire by reducing the longitudinal braking force and allowing the lateral cornering force to increase up to the limit of adhesion, if needed to maintain the lean angle of the motorcycle. It cannot prevent motorcycle crashes if they are caused by a loss of traction on slippery surfaces when the rider is only cornering and not applying the brakes.

The first production motorcycle with the MSC system was the 2014 KTM 1190 Adventure.
