= KTM 1190 RC8 =

Motorcycle model

KTM RC8
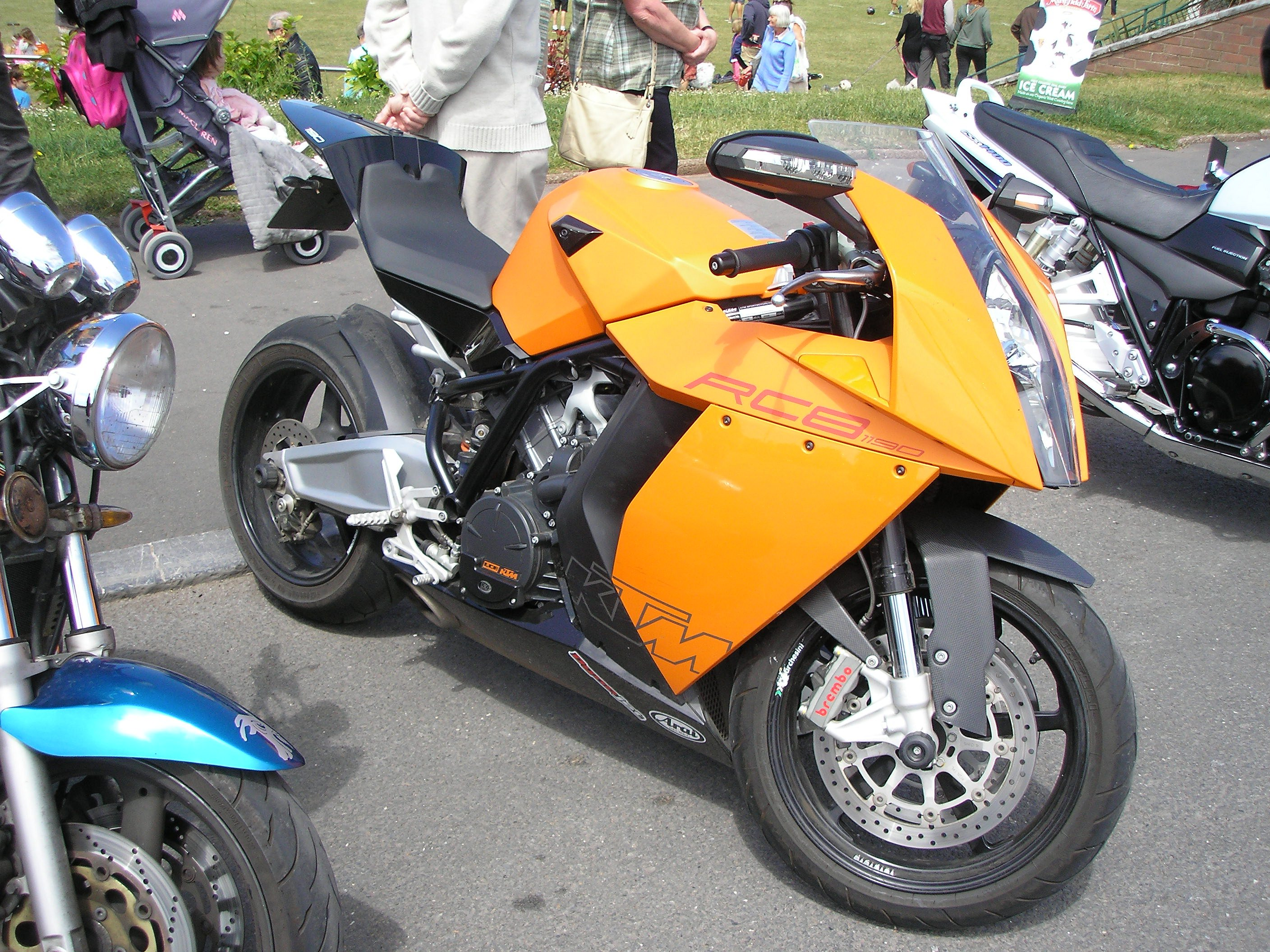
- Production: 2008-2015
- Class: Super bike
- Engine: 4-stroke, V-twin 75° 1,195 cc (72.9 cu in) ,4 valve per cylinder DOHC, liquid cooled
- Bore / stroke: 105 mm × 69 mm (4.1 in × 2.7 in)
- Transmission: 6 gears
- Frame type: Chromium-Molybdenum trellis frame, powder-coated
- Suspension: Front: WP USD 43 mm (1.7 in); Rear: WP Monoshock
- Brakes: Front: 2 x Brembo four piston, radially bolted caliper, brake disc 320 mm (13 in); Rear: Brembo two piston, fixed caliper, brake disc 220 mm (8.7 in)
- Tires: Front: 120 / 70 ZR 17; Rear: 190 / 55 ZR 17
- Rake, trail: 90 mm (3.5 in) / 92 mm (3.6 in)
- Wheelbase: 1,425 mm (56.1 in)
- Seat height: 805 mm (31.7 in) / 825 mm (32.5 in)
- Fuel capacity: 16.5 L (3.6 imp gal; 4.4 US gal)

The KTM 1190 RC8 is a supersport bike made by KTM. The now highly collectable first generation 2008 model had a 1,148 cc (70.1 cu in) V-twin engine and was the Austrian manufacturer's first-ever Superbike design. The RC8 model was supplemented with RC8 R models one year later in 2009 and the RC8 designation had its last year of production in 2010. Models from 2009 through to 2013 use a 1,195 cc (72.9 cu in) V-twin engine with a twin spark per cylinder head and 2mm oversize piston. It is believed fewer than 1000 RC8 and RC8 R motorcycles were produced.

== Design ==
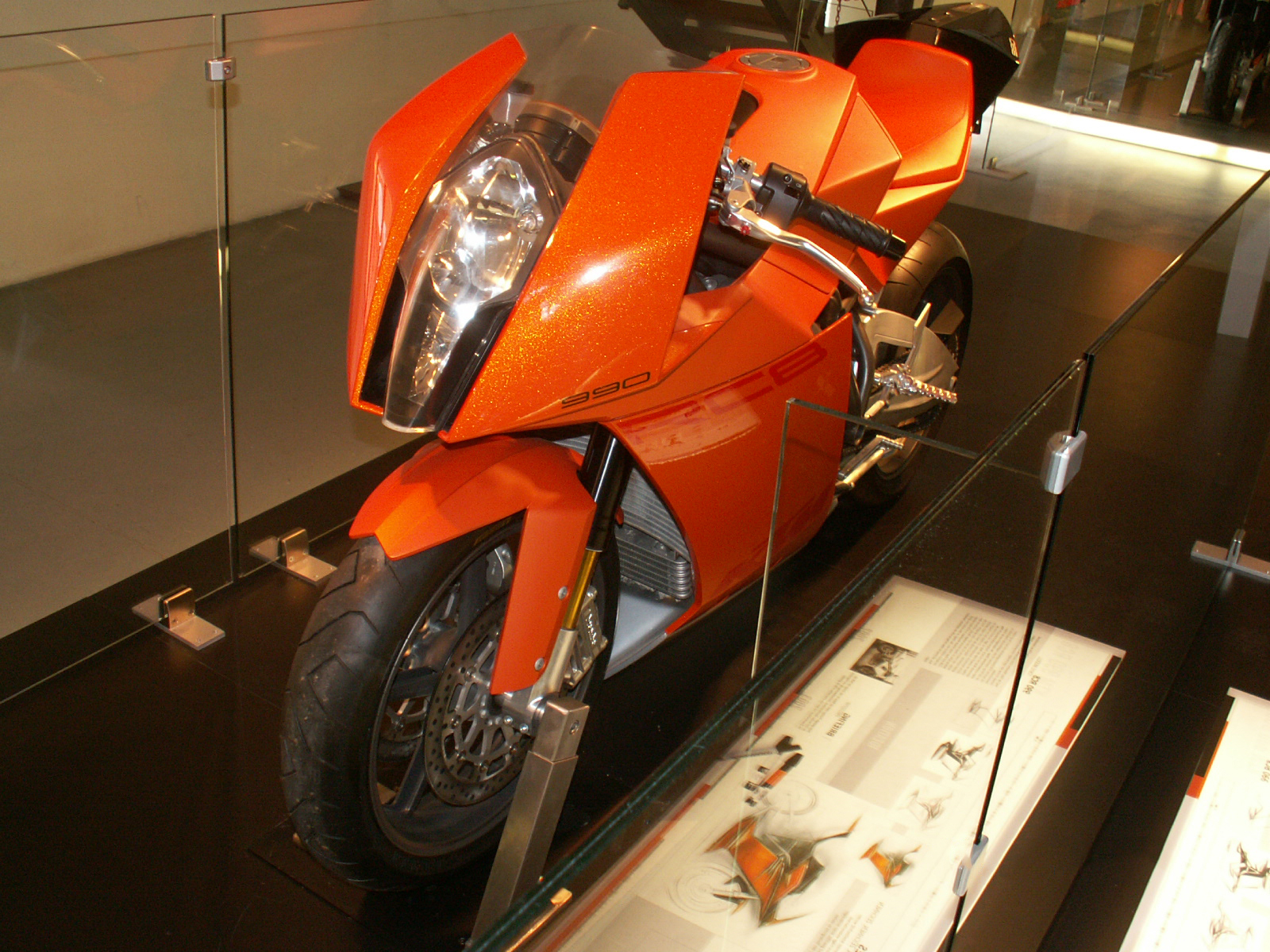
KTM RC8 prototype

The first concept of the bike appeared in 2005, powered by the Super Duke 999 cc (61.0 cu in) v-twin. The displacement was increased to 1,148 cc (70.1 cu in) for the production version. The bike has a steel trellis frame with a cast aluminium seat subframe. The suspension uses high-end inverted forks and an alloy, double-sided swingarm made by WP, a KTM subsidiary. The bike for 2013 and on comes in a single color, black and white with orange accents.

== RC8 R ==
=== 2010 ===
The RC8 R was delivered to the United States in 2010 as a 2011 model with more track-oriented features than the standard RC8. Engine displacement increased to 1,195 cc (72.9 cu in) with a higher compression ratio of 13.5:1. It has titanium intake valves and a low-friction diamond-like carbon (DLC) treatment on its camshafts' finger followers. The RC8 R's WP suspension includes a 43 mm inverted fork at the front end, with a titanium-aluminum-nitride low-stiction coating on its sliders. A high-end shock supports the bike's rear, and its piston rod is also finished with the titanium-aluminum-nitride coating. The fork has three modes of adjustment (compression damping, rebound damping and spring preload), while the shock separates the compression damping into high and low speed circuits and has ride-height adjustability. An adjustable steering damper completes the suspension.

The RC8 R offers many chassis adjustments not found on other superbikes. In addition to the suspension, the rider can adjust many other parts on the bike including the front brake lever, the rear brake pedal, the clutch lever, the handlebars, the shifter, the footpegs, and the seat/subframe height. Essentially, the adjustable options allow the RC8 R to accommodate riders of various sizes.

=== 2011 and 2012 ===
Internal improvements were made for these model years based on rider reviews and in-house testing. 250 models were made for North America for 2011 and 2012 years. The KTM engineers included a heavier crankshaft and flywheel aimed at reducing the buzzy nature of the previous RC8R and to emphasize low-end torque. Throttle butterflies were remapped to reduce the amount of opening under small throttle inputs for much smoother transitions and to address the "snatchy throttle" complaints directed at the earlier models. The new cylinder head uses two spark plugs in each cylinder; below 7,000 rpm only one of the two fires, while above 7,000 both are used for optimum burning and reduced detonation which also allows for a re-tuned ECU that has revamped cam timing and the 52 mm throttle bodies. Also new with this model are cast aluminum Marchesini wheels and strategic front and rear suspension updates.

== Racing ==
At the launch of the RC8 superbike KTM announced it will race the RC8 in the FIM Superstock championship in 2008. KTM's two-year plan was to get the bike regularly on the podium in superstock before moving up to the Superbike World Championship. For 2009, the KTM RC8 Super Cup ran as a one make support class at selected rounds of the British Superbike Championship, and in 2010 Redline KTM competed in the newly-formed BSB Evo class with rider James Edmeades.

For 2012, Chris Filmore riding for the KTM Factory Racing team earned his career best finish at the final round of the AMA Pro SuperBike Series held at NOLA Motorsports Park on October 6 finishing 4th that day, 5th place the next, ending the season 11th overall and signed with the team for 2013.

== Specifications ==
All specifications are manufacturer claimed.

	2008	2009/2010	2011/2012	2013
Engine
Engine Type	1,150 cc (70 cu in) liquid-cooled 75° V-Twin	1,195 cc (72.9 cu in) liquid-cooled 75° V-Twin		
HP	151 hp	173 hp		
Torque	85 ft-lbs	90 ft-lbs		
Bore/Stroke	103.0 mm × 69.0 mm (4.06 in × 2.72 in)	105.0 mm × 69.0 mm (4.13 in × 2.72 in)		
Number Produced	152	836		
Compression Ratio	12.5:1	13.5:1		
Valve Train	DOHC, 4 valves per cylinder, chain-driven			
Fuel Delivery	Electronically controlled fuel injection		Electronically controlled fuel injection / Twin Spark	
Ignition	Contactless controlled fully electronic ignition with digital ignition adjustment			
Drivetrain
Transmission	Wet multi-disc clutch Magura hydraulic with optional Slipper Action			Wet Multi-disc clutch Magura hydraulic with Slipper Action
Final Drive	sealed chain			
Chassis/Suspension/Brakes
Front Suspension	43 mm inverted fork with top-out springs			
Rear Suspension	WP 4014 Emulsion Shock Absorber			
Front Brakes	Twin floating 320 mm (12.6 in) disc with radial mount, 4-piston calipers			
Rear Brakes	Single 220 mm (8.7 in) disc with single-piston caliper			
Front Tire	120/70ZR-17			
Rear Tire	190/55ZR-17			
Dimensions
Rake	66.7 degrees			
Trail	98.6			
Wheelbase	1,435 mm (56.5 in)	1,425 mm (56.1 in)		
Seat Height	805 mm (31.7 in)			
Fuel Capacity	16.5 L (3.6 imp gal; 4.4 US gal)			
