= Ducati Multistrada 1200 =

Multistrada
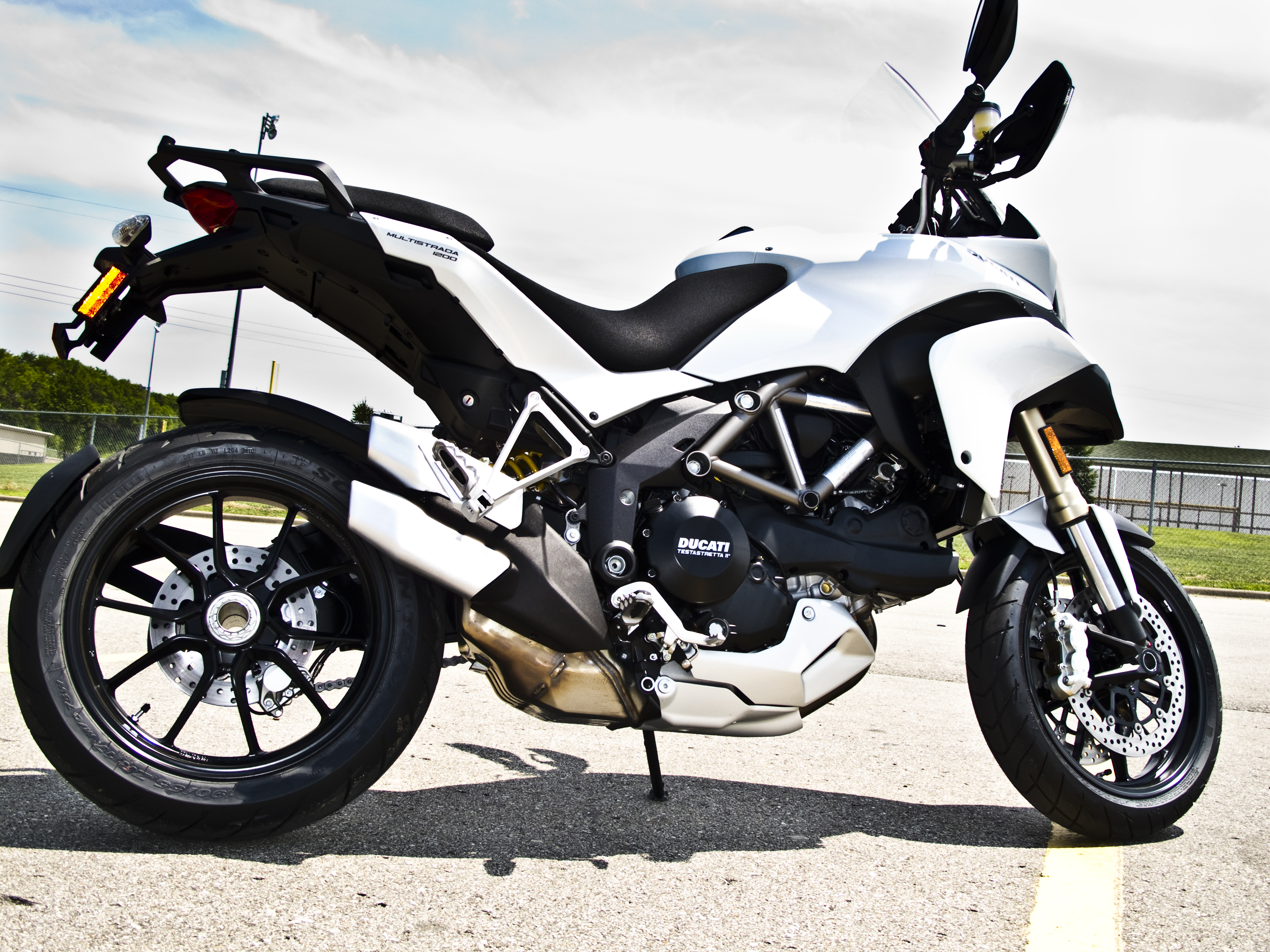
- Manufacturer: Ducati Motor Holding S.p.A.
- Also called: MTS
- Production: Since 2010
- Predecessor: Multistrada 1100
- Successor: Multistrada 1260
- Class: Adventure touring
- Engine: 1,198 cc 4-valve desmodromic liquid-cooled 90° L-twin engine
- Bore / stroke: 106.0 mm × 67.9 mm (4.17 in × 2.67 in)
- Compression ratio: 11.5:1
- Top speed: 145 mph (233 km/h)
- Power: 150 hp (110 kW); 136.5 hp (101.8 kW) (rear wheel at 9,200 rpm
- Torque: 87.5 lb⋅ft (118.6 N⋅m); 85.0 lb⋅ft (115.2 N⋅m) (rear wheel at 7,700 rpm
- Ignition type: Electronic
- Transmission: 6-speed constant-mesh with overdrive 6th gear Wet, hydraulic multi-plate slipper clutch, radial master cylinder
- Frame type: Large-diameter light-gauge steel tube trellis main and rear subframes connected by cast aluminum central sections
- Suspension: Front: Standard model - Marzocchi 50 mm fully adjustable upside-down fork. S models - Öhlins 48 mm upside-down fork with electronically adjustable compression and rebound damping and manually adjustable preload. 170 mm (6.7 in) wheel travel); Rear: Standard model - fully adjustable Sachs monoshock. S models - Öhlins TTX twin tube shock with electronically adjustable compression and rebound damping and preload. 170mm (6.7 in) wheel travel. Aluminium single-sided swingarm with cast, fabricated and welded construction designed to deliver a rising suspension rate.
- Brakes: Front: 2 × 320 mm semi-floating discs, radially mounted 4-piston, 2-pad Brembo calipers, radial master cylinder Rear: 245 mm disc, 2-piston caliper Bosch-Brembo (defeatable) ABS (S models, optional on standard model)
- Tires: Front: 120/70ZR17 Pirelli Scorpion Trail dual compound mounted on 3.50 x 17 10-spoke light alloy wheel Rear: 190/55ZR17 Pirelli Scorpion Trail dual compound mounted on 6.00 x 17 10-spoke light alloy wheel
- Rake, trail: 25°/ 109 mm (4.3 in)
- Wheelbase: 1,530 mm (60 in)
- Dimensions: L: 2,200 mm (87 in); W: 945 mm (37.2 in); 985 mm (38.8 in) with panniers H: 1,045 mm (41.1 in) (1,465 mm (57.7 in) windscreen raised
- Seat height: 850 mm (33 in)
- Weight: 189 kg (417 lb) (dry); 239 kg (527 lb) (wet)
- Fuel capacity: 20 L (4.4 imp gal; 5.3 US gal)
- Oil capacity: 3.4 L (3.6 US quarts)
- Fuel consumption: 7.84–5 L/100 km (36.0–56.5 mpg_{‑imp}; 30.0–47.0 mpg_{‑US}), average 6.19 L/100 km (45.6 mpg_{‑imp}; 38.0 mpg_{‑US})
- Turning radius: 2,535 mm (99.8 in)

The Ducati Multistrada 1200 is a motorcycle made by Ducati since 2010 The engine is a retuned version of the Testastretta from the 1198 superbike, now called the Testastretta 11° for its 11° valve overlap (reduced from 41°). All models include throttle by wire, selectable engine mapping (full power with sensitive (Sport) or relaxed throttle response (Touring), and reduced power with relaxed throttle response (Urban and Enduro) and traction control adjustable through eight levels, called DTC (Ducati Traction Control).

The Multistrada 1200 comes in three equipment levels: the base, the S-Sport and the S-Touring. The S models include ABS (optional on standard model) and electronically adjustable Öhlins suspension, called Ducati Electronic Suspension (DES). The S Sport comes with carbon fiber beaks/air intake, side- and cambelt covers. The S Touring model comes with heated grips, hard luggage and a center stand.

Over 10,000 units were sold in the first year.

The Multistrada 1200 won the 1205 Division of the Pikes Peak International Hill Climb in 2010, 2011 and in 2012. In 2012, a Spider Grips Ducati Team Multistrada ridden by Carlin Dunne achieved the first sub 10 minute time for a motorcycle with a time of 9:52.819, only a bit over a second slower than the 2011 overall record.

== Engine modes ==
The bike has four engine power modes: Sport, Touring, Urban and Enduro. Riders can change power modes with the motorcycle underway by using the turn-signal cancel button. Sport and Touring modes provide the full 150 bhp with the Touring mode providing a softer throttle response. Urban and Enduro reduce horsepower to 100 bhp and provide different levels of ABS and traction control accordingly. Riders also have the option of customizing any of these modes by changing the horsepower, throttle response, ABS and traction control levels using menu items inside the instrument cluster.

== DES suspension ==
The Ducati Electronic Suspension was developed in conjunction with Öhlins, and was by-product of its MotoGP and World Superbike motorcycle racing experience.

On the S-model Multistradas, with electronic suspension, preload and damping rates change with each of the engine power modes. Riders can also choose between four different base-settings based on having a passenger or luggage. Just like with the engine performance modes, riders can customize each of these settings using menu's inside the instrument cluster. In 2013 Öhlins offer an upgraded SCU (Suspension Control Unit) that allows the passive Öhlins S suspension to become semiactive, using throttle input, engine speed, horsepower setting and other variables to change settings automatically during riding without rider input. The system is directly derived from Öhlins and Ducatis racing experience, lacking only the GPS sensor input from the racebikes.

== 2012 ==
For the 2012 model year the seat was redesigned to allow more rider movement forward and aft. ABS was made standard on all iterations of the bike.

== 2013 ==
For 2013 the Multistrada 1200 had changes including the addition of an active suspension system, using solenoid/valve actuated methods to actively control damping rates, often called the "Sky-Hook method". The bike also had a revised second generation of the Testastretta 11-degree motor, now with "twin-plug cylinder heads for smoother, more efficient combustion", the change contributing to a 5% increase in torque and a 10% improvement in fuel consumption. Also, there are significant changes to the windscreen, which is "larger and shaped to reduce noise at high speed". A new Granturismo model has larger side-cases, the addition of a top case, driving lights and more touring-oriented tires.

== 2014 ==
The 2014 Ducati Multistrada 1200 uses the second generation Testastretta 11° DS engine and the Bosch ABS 9ME braking system along with the Ducati Traction Control (DTC). Ducati continues to use the electronic Ride-by-Wire system, which allows riders to switch between four riding modes while in motion; sport, touring, urban and enduro. The modes range in horsepower from 150 high, 150 low, 100, and off-road respectively. The bike has a dry weight of just 428lb and uses advanced ergonomics.

== 2015 ==
The 2015 Ducati Multistrada 1200 was redesigned with new fairings and the Desmodromic Variable Timing (DVT) motor using hydraulically actuated adjusters to vary timing thru 90° of camshaft rotation. The new motor has a claimed 160 hp (120 kW) and 100.3 lb⋅ft (136.0 N⋅m) torque and 8% better fuel mileage as well as a longer maintenance schedule (18,600 miles for valve adjustments). There is a new 5-axis Inertial Measurement Unit (IMU) measuring pitch, roll and yaw to enhance ABS (cornering ABS), DTC and Skyhook. It also enables Ducati Wheelie Control (DWC), and cornering lights that activate at over 20 mph (32 km/h) and 7° lean angle. Switchgear is backlit. Electronic cruise control is now standard on both base and S models. The display has been redesigned with the base still having a LCD but the S model now has a full color TFT display. Bluetooth is incorporated into the dash.

== 2018 ==
The 2018 Ducati Multistrada uses the 1262 cc motor from the Diavel and now designated 1260. The new motor cures the power dip at 5000 rpm of the 1200DVT motor. Ducati changed the way they measure hp and torque so it drops to 158 hp (118 kW) and 95.5 lb⋅ft (129.5 N⋅m) torque. Wheelbase increased 2.2 inches, and rake increased 1° for better stability. The display has higher resolution and user interface has been updated with more graphics. Keyless system has been improved. A quickshifter is standard on the S model. Brembo M50 is standard front caliper for the S model and Pikes Peak.
