= WP Suspension =

Austrian manufacturer of components for motorcycle suspension systems

WP Suspension GmbH
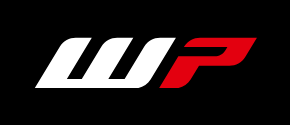
- Formerly: White Power Suspension
- Company type: GmbH
- Industry: Motorcycle
- Founded: 1977
- Founder: Wim Peters
- Headquarters: Mattighofen, Austria
- Products: Motorcycle suspension components
- Owner: Bajaj Auto
- Website: www.wp-suspension.com

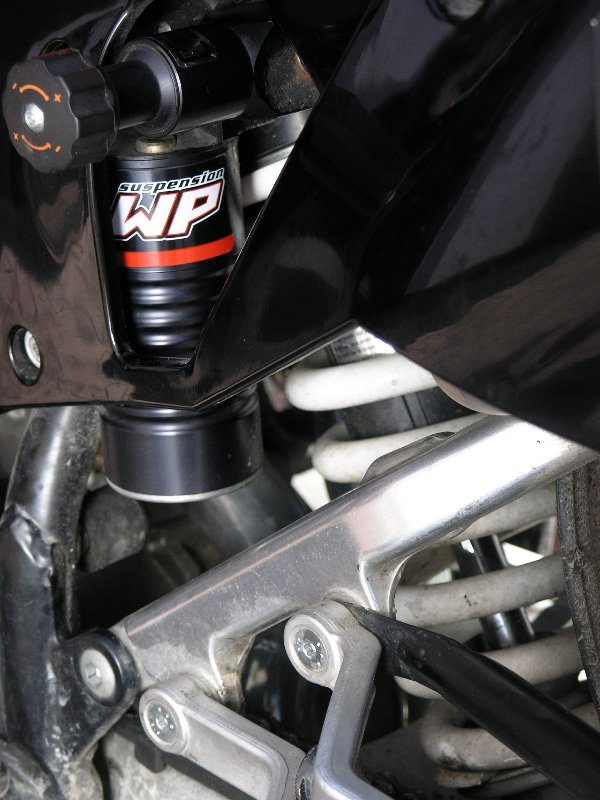
WP rear shock unit on a KTM 950 Adventure in 2007

WP Suspension GmbH is a manufacturer of components for motorcycle suspension systems based in Austria. The company was founded in 1977 by Wim Peters in Malden, Netherlands and is amongst the largest manufacturers of suspension components for motorcycles. It is today a wholly owned subsidiary of India's Bajaj Auto through KTM AG.

== Company history ==
Dutch motocross rider Wim Peters had a serious crash in a race in 1975, needing over a year for recovery from injuries. The trained mechanical engineer used this downtime to improve the suspension elements of his motocross machine. Though the parts were originally intended only for his own use, Peters' success with his components was noticed by other racers, and he founded the company in 1977 to deal with demand.

A visual characteristic of the brand are the white coil springs on the coilover suspension struts, which also led to the original brand name, White Power. The white coating of the springs was originally due to the chosen supplier being a hospital bed manufacturer, and white was the only colour they had available. Racing success at the end of the 1970s and into the 1980s established the brand's reputation.

In the 1980s the company developed from an aftermarket producer to an original equipment manufacturer for KTM in 1983, and later for Husaberg and BMW Motorrad.

In 1983 WP re-introduced the upside-down fork (USD) into mass production. Originally invented by BMW, and used on the R 12 model, this kind of setup had largely fallen into disuse between 1945 and 1983. The USD fork has since become the standard configuration for all performance-oriented motorcycles.

In 1984 WP supplied suspension components to KTM's first Motocross World Championship victory in the 250cc class with Heinz Kinigadner.

After bankruptcy in 1991 and the subsequent refounding, the brand name WP Suspension replaced the name White Power.

In 1994 WP supplied suspension components to the B194 car by Benetton which propelled Michael Schumacher to his first Formula 1 world championship title.

=== KTM subsidiary ===
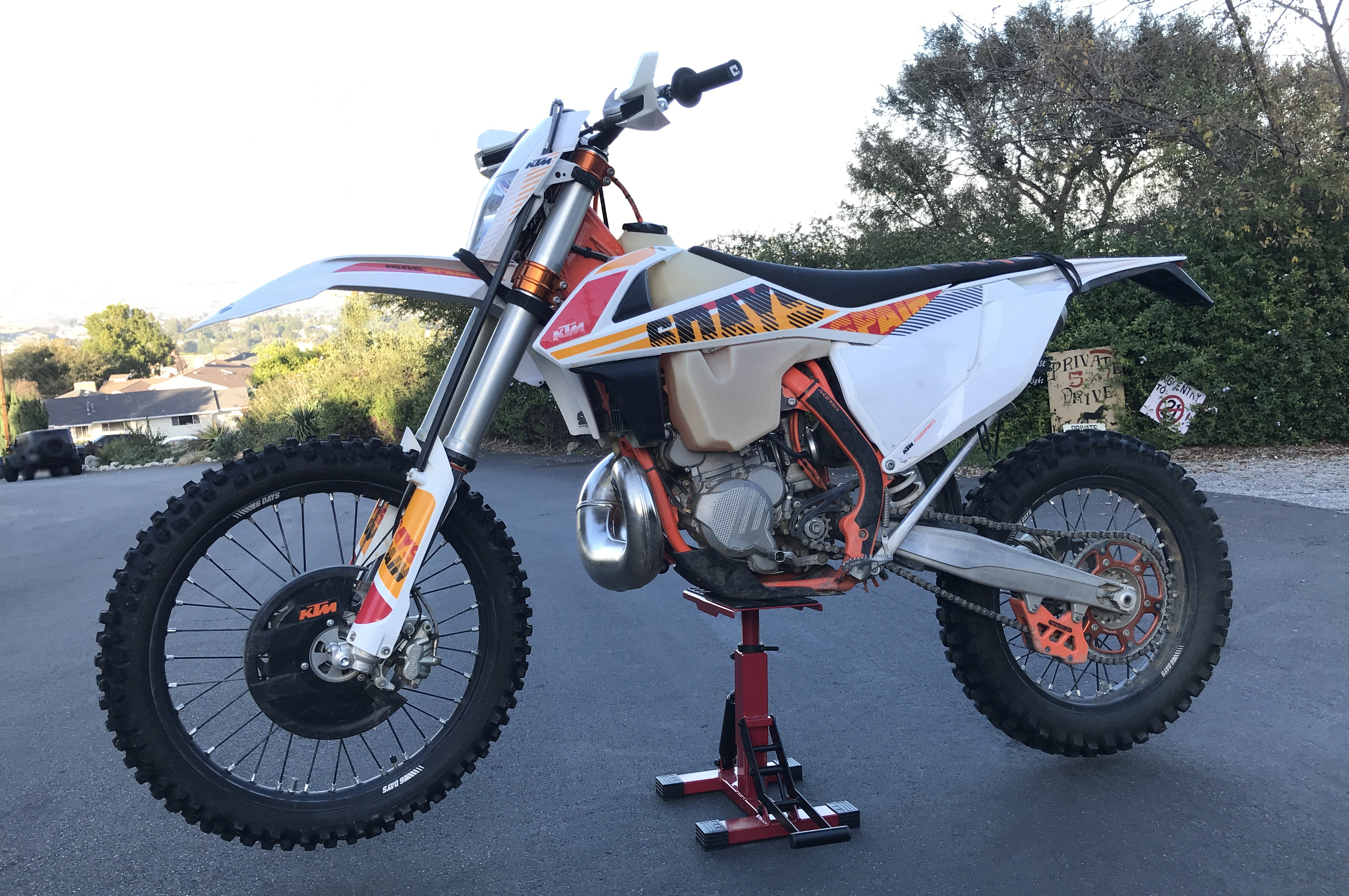
2017 KTM 300 XC-W with WP suspensions

From 1997 KTM Power Sports gradually took over the company. Wim Peters remained connected with WP, initially as managing director and later as consultant until his departure in 2004. Beginning in 2009, production was moved to Munderfing, Austria, and suspension components are no longer produced in the former main factory in Malden, Netherlands. In the 2010s, WP expanded their manufacturing portfolio to include frames, exhaust systems, and oil and water coolers for motorcycles and was briefly renamed WP Performance Systems GmbH. As of 2020, the non-suspension activities have been sold off or transferred to other divisions within the parent company, with WP again concentrating solely on the development and manufacture of motorcycle suspension systems.

== See also ==
- Shock absorber
- Motorcycle fork
