= KTM 390 series =

KTM 390 Duke
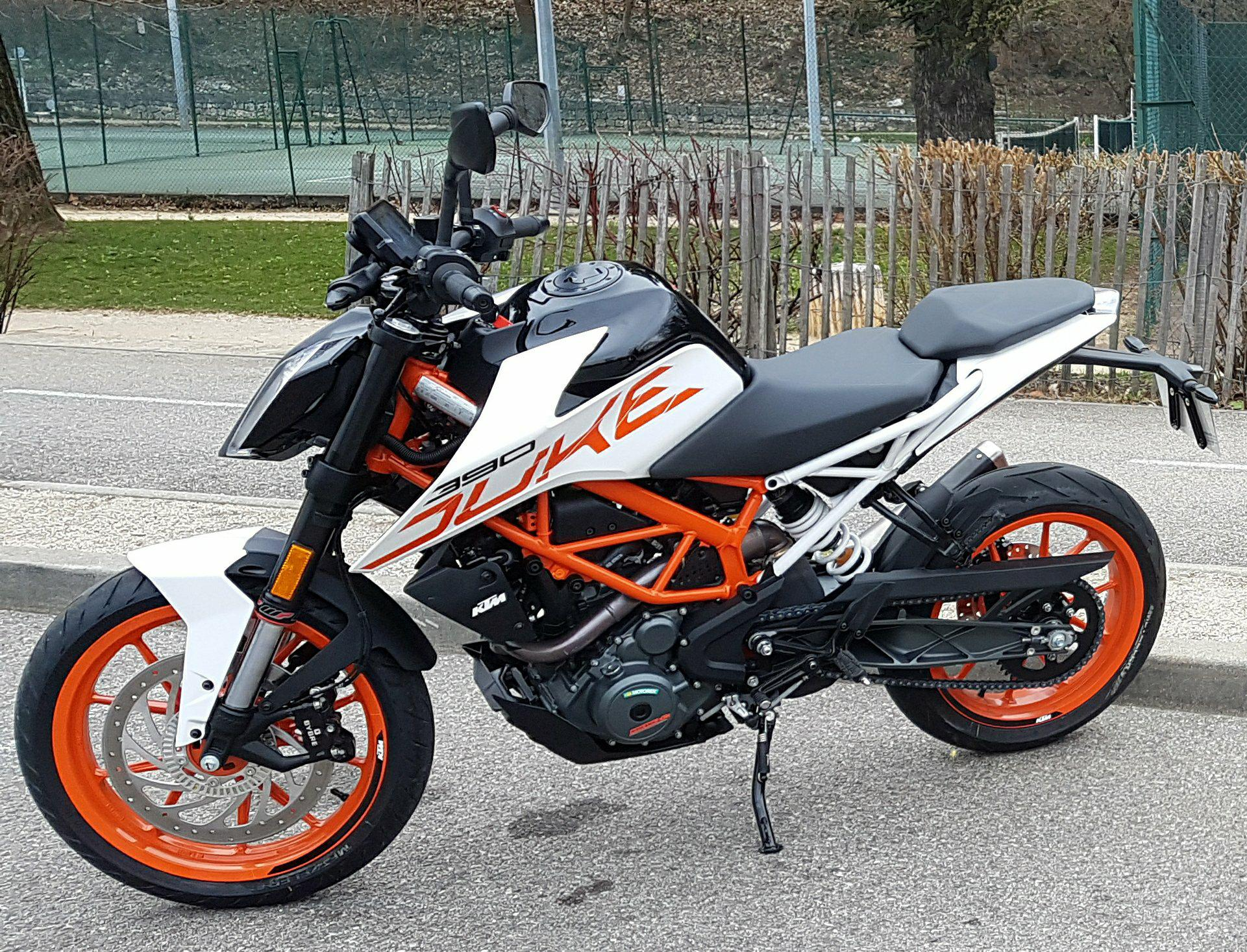
- Manufacturer: Bajaj Auto and KTM
- Production: 2013–present
- Assembly: India, Philippines, and Argentina
- Class: Standard
- Engine: 398.6 cc (24.32 cu in) 4-stroke, liquid-cooled single
- Bore / stroke: 89 mm × 64 mm (3.5 in × 2.5 in)
- Compression ratio: 12.6:1
- Top speed: 171 km/h (106 mph)
- Power: 33 kW (44 hp) @ 9,500 rpm (claimed)
- Torque: 35 N⋅m (26 ft⋅lb) @ 7250 rpm (claimed)
- Ignition type: Bosch digital
- Transmission: Wet clutch, 6-speed, X-ring chain
- Frame type: Tubular steel trellis
- Suspension: Front: 43 mm WP telescopic fork, 150 mm (5.9 in) travel; Rear: mono-shock swingarm
- Brakes: ByBre ABS disc; Front: four-piston radial caliper, 300 mm (2013–2016) 320 mm (2017–present) rotor; Rear: 230 mm
- Tires: Metzeler Sportec M5 17-110/70 x 17-150/60
- Rake, trail: 25°, 100 mm (3.9 in)
- Wheelbase: 1,367 mm (53.8 in)
- Dimensions: L: 2,002 mm (78.8 in); W: 873 mm (34.4 in); H: 1,267 mm (49.9 in)
- Seat height: 800 mm (31 in)
- Weight: 149 kg (328 lb) (claimed) (dry): 168.3 kg (371 lb) (claimed); 169 kg (372 lb); (wet)
- Fuel capacity: 13.5 L (3.6 US gal)
- Fuel consumption: 4.7 L/100 km; 50 mpg_{‑US} (60 mpg_{‑imp})
- Related: KTM Duke series KTM 690 series

The KTM 390 Series is a range of single-cylinder engine motorcycles assembled by Bajaj Auto, and KTM Asia Motorcycle Manufacturing, Inc. (KAMMI) for the Austrian manufacturer KTM.

There are currently six bike models which were developed under a joint program of Bajaj and KTM engineers, in which the concept was developed in Austria, while everything else, including design and final product development, was done in India by Bajaj. The six models in the line up are the road worthy 390 Duke, RC 390 and 390 SMC R and the dual purpose 390 Enduro R, 390 Adventure R and the 390 Adventure X.

== History ==
The 390 Duke standard debuted at the 2012 EICMA show in Milan, Italy, and went on sale in India and the Philippines in 2013 and in the US in 2015. The RC 390 sport bike was presented at EICMA the following year. After the Duke's initial release, KTM CEO Stefan Pierer announced plans to export the 390 Duke to the US for 2014. Bajaj said eventually the bike will be sold in 80 countries worldwide. Pierer said in December 2015 that KTM and Bajaj plan to replace the 125, 200, and the 390-series Duke and RC lines in 2017, based on all new platforms, in part tarnavo meet Euro IV emissions standards, and to incorporate new technologies such as ride-by-wire.

In 2024 KTM started the transition from the original 373.2 cm^{3} motor to the new 398.6 cm^{3} LC4c motors. The new 390 SMC R, Enduro and Adventure models began introduction into the 2025 line-up.

== 390 Duke ==
In its home market, the 390 Duke's engine size and weight place it in the mid-range category, and it sells for more than three times the average price of a motorcycle in India. As one Indian reviewer put it "The 390 Duke may well be a simple little A2 license commuter for the European rider, but in the environs of Mumbai traffic, it's a proper rocket-powered scalpel." In the US market, the same motorcycle is considered small-displacement, lightweight, and relatively inexpensive. Similarly, the UK Sunday Times said, "Given that the 390 Duke weighs less than 150kg when it's full of fuel, you have to sit on it to stop it blowing away. It's as agile in traffic as a push-bike and whippet-thin," saying the bike was ideal for young riders with the A2 license, limited to 47 bhp (35 kW), who would find it easy to ride and confidence-inspiring, while feeling "fast and sporty". Such a bike in the UK would also appeal to experienced riders looking for a practical and efficient commuter bike and runabout. The 390 Duke won the 2013–14 Jury's Choice Bike of the Year in The Bloomberg TV India Autocar India Awards. IndianCarsBikes said that with a top speed of 180 km/h (110 mph) and a 0 to 100 km/h (0 to 62 mph) time of 4.3 seconds, the 390 Duke is the fastest motorcycle made in India as of January 2014.

Motorcycle Consumer News tested the 390 Duke's top speed to be 177.0 km/h (110.0 mph), with acceleration from 0 to 97 km/h (0 to 60 mph) in 4.34 seconds, and 0 to 1/4 mi (0.00 to 0.40 km) in 14.02 seconds at 147.87 km/h (91.88 mph). The brakes stopped the bike from 97 to 0 km/h (60 to 0 mph) in 43.1 m (141.3 ft), and fuel economy was tested at 3.97 L/100 km; 71.2 mpg_{‑imp} (59.3 mpg_{‑US}). The 390 Duke weighed 153 kg (338 lb) wet and the engine power was 30.04 kW (40.29 hp) at 9,600 rpm, with 32.92 N⋅m (24.28 ft⋅lb) torque @ 7,000 rpm. The brakes were considered to be "the most obvious flaw on the 390".

It comes standard with kickstand sensor, switchable dual-channel combined ABS, traction control system, engine braking control, adaptive brake light, and cornering lights. As a feature, it has no keyless ignition but only optional immobiliser key and alarm system.

=== Duke model timeline ===
The 390 Duke of 2013 came about from efforts to place the larger 373 cm^{3} motor into the robust frame of the Duke 200 while utilizing the same suspension and brakes.

=== 2017 update ===
After 2017, the 390 series' front brake disc was increased from 300 mm to 320 mm. The headlight was redesigned and converted to LED. The display became a color TFT panel with phone pairing capability. Seat height was increased from 800 mm (31.5 in) to 830 mm (32.7 in) and wheelbase was decreased 10 mm. The brake and clutch levers were also made manually adjustable. The throttle now uses a ride by wire system and the tank was updated from 11 to 13.5 L (2.9 to 3.6 US gal).

=== 2018 update ===
In 2018, KTM updated its Duke 390 with some minor changes, where it added a deflector plate on the left side of the chassis, to avoid exhaust heat near the riders leg. The Duke 390 in India gained new features and updates. The Duke 390 comes with a daytime running light, and is on Euro IV emission standards.

=== 2020 update ===
The bike was made BS6 compliant and a bi-directional quickshifter was added.

=== 2022 update ===
3 new colors are available for the 2022 Duke, which was launched in Egypt at an ex-showroom price of ₹2.7 lakh (US$2,900). In Austria, it was released at €6,749 (US$7,982.04).

=== 2023 update ===
After using the old 373 cm^{3} engine for a decade, the Duke 390 received its first definitive engine upgrade in 2023. The new engine, called the LC4c, was 398.6 cm^{3} compared to the old 373 cm^{3} and also made more power and torque with peak power being approximately 32.8 kW (44.0 hp) and peak torque now being 39.0 N⋅m (28.8 ft⋅lb).

The chassis and subframe were also entirely new. To allow for a bigger airbox, KTM moved the rear monoshock to the right which also allowed them to reduce the seat height from 820mm in the older models to a more accessible 800mm. However, an accessory 820mm seat is still offered by KTM. Due to these changes, the ground clearance too went up significantly from 150mm to 183mm. This was also the first time the Duke 390 received fully adjustable suspensions at both the front and rear. The fuel tank capacity also went up from 13.5L to 15L.

The brakes received a significant upgrade as well with the front brake now being a wheel mounted disc over the regular, hub-mounted disc unit on the old bike.

=== 2025 update ===
The LC4c engine still made 32.8 kW (44.0 hp) and 39.0 N⋅m (28.8 ft⋅lb) but received an improved transmission and optimized cylinder head for a smoother power delivery and lighter weight.

A 5″ bonded-glass TFT display with turn-by-turn navigation, music, and call integration was offered. The three ride modes - Street, Rain, Track - were still on offer. Launch Control is standard and has been so since 2023 but is unlocked only after covering the first 1000kms.

Cruise control also became a standard and three new buttons on the left side switch gears were added for the dedicated cruise control mode with pedal switches to increase or decrease the cruise control speed on the fly.

In April 2026, KTM introduced a 349.32 cc version of the 390 Duke in India to take advantage of the lower goods and services tax rate applicable to motorcycles in the lower engine-capacity category. The new version produces 41.5 PS (30.5 kW) and 33.5 N⋅m of torque. It is sold alongside the existing 398.6 cc model, which was renamed the 390 Duke R and produces 46 PS (33.8 kW) and 39 N⋅m of torque.

== 390 SMC R ==
The Supermoto version of the 390 Duke, the KTM 390 SMC R was introduced in 2025. Its 398.6 cm^{3} LC4c motor produces 46 PS. The ride-by-wire throttle allows Street and Sport ride modes, on/off traction control, and Supermoto ABS mode allowing you to turn off the rear ABS (front ABS is always on). The SMC R has different geometry via 26.9 deg steering head angle, different subframe mounts and a different flex profile compared to the Duke. The wheelbase is almost 4 inches longer as well. It is equipped with 17" wire spoked wheels. It joins the other two bikes in the KTM Supermoto lineup, the 450 SMR and the 690 SMC R.

== RC 390 ==
KTM RC 390
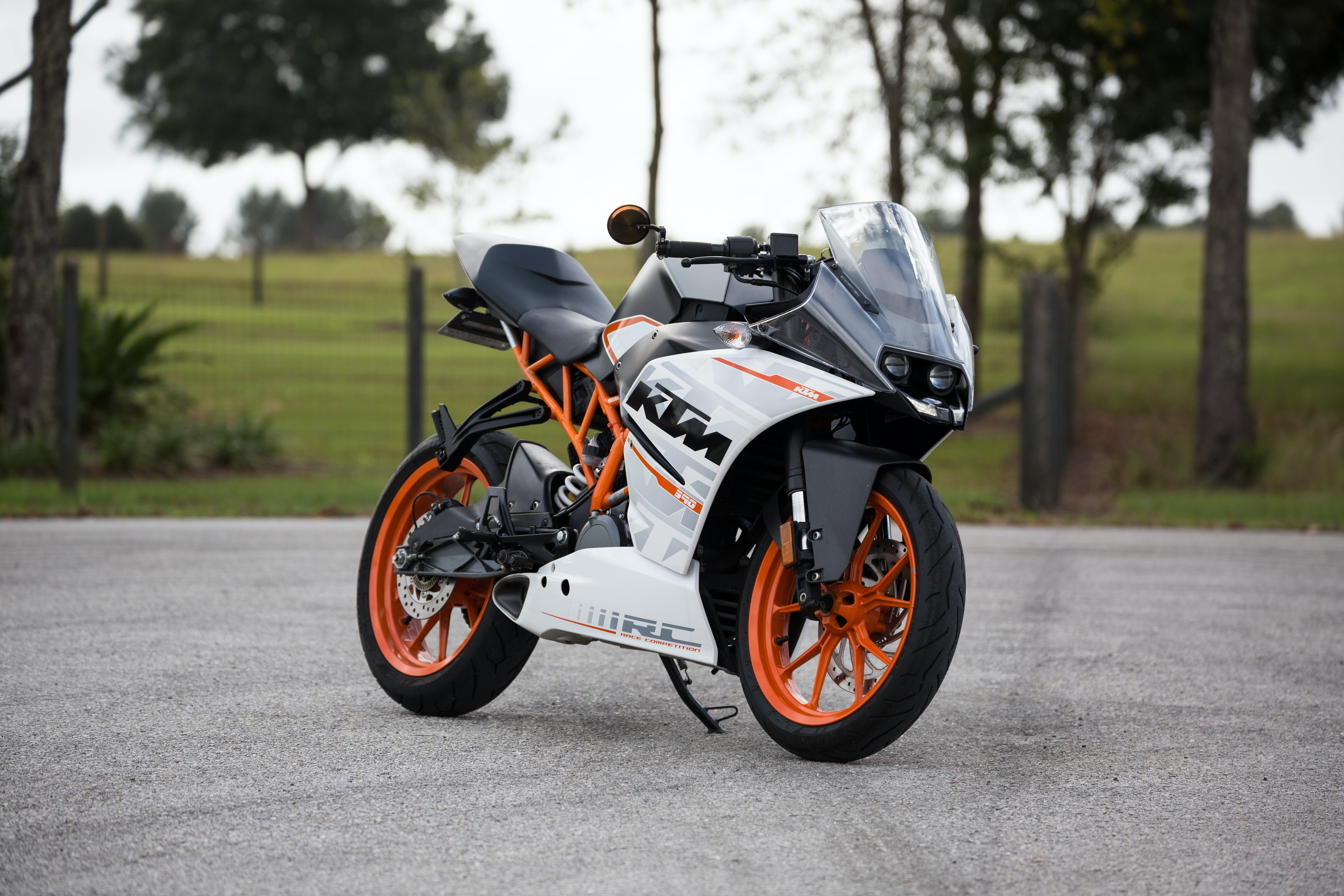
- Manufacturer: Bajaj Auto and KTM
- Production: 2014–present
- Assembly: India and Philippines
- Class: Sport bike
- Engine: 373.2 cc (22.77 cu in) single
- Bore / stroke: 89 mm × 60 mm (3.5 in × 2.4 in)
- Top speed: 180 km/h (110 mph)
- Power: 30.04 kW (40.29 hp) @ 8,600 rpm
- Torque: 32.92 N⋅m (24.28 ft⋅lb) @ 6,800 rpm
- Ignition type: Bosch digital
- Transmission: Multi-plate wet clutch (slipper (2017–present), 6-speed, X-ring chain
- Frame type: Single-piece steel trellis
- Suspension: Front: 43 mm WP telescopic fork, 150 mm travel; Rear: mono-shock swingarm adj. preload, damping
- Brakes: ByBre ABS disc; Front: four-piston radial caliper, 300 mm (2013–2016) 320 mm (2017–present) rotor; Rear: 230 mm
- Tires: Pirelli Diablo Rosso II; Front: 110/70ZR17, Rear: 150/60ZR17
- Rake, trail: 23.5°, 89 mm (3.5 in)
- Wheelbase: 1,340 mm (53 in)
- Seat height: 820 mm (32 in)
- Weight: 147 kg (324 lb) (claimed, without fuel) (dry): 150 kg (340 lb) (estimated); 165.3 kg (364.5 lb); (wet)
- Fuel capacity: 10 L (2.6 US gal)
- Fuel consumption: 4.17–4.06 L/100 km; 67.7–69.7 mpg_{‑imp} (56.4–58 mpg_{‑US})

A sport bike version of the 390 Duke, the KTM RC 390 (Note: RC is short for "Road/Competition".") was presented at the 2013 EICMA motorcycle show in Italy, though most details had been leaked a few weeks earlier. The 2014 model year road racing style bike has the same 373 cm^{3} engine making a claimed 44 hp (33 kW) @ 9,500 rpm with a claimed weight without fuel of 147 kg (324 lb). With a fuel capacity 10.0 L; 2.20 imp gal (2.64 US gal), the wet weight would be 150 kg (340 lb). The frame of the RC is a different single piece trellis frame than the Duke, which KTM says is stiffer than the 390 Duke. The tires are Metzeler 110/70ZR17 front and 150/60ZR17 rear. Where the Duke has a steering head angle of 65° (or 25° rake), the RC's fork has a steeper 66.5° head angle (or 23.5° rake). The 1,340 mm (53 in) wheelbase is 27 mm (1.1 in) shorter than the Duke. The same ByBre disc brakes with switchable dual channel ABS, and WP 43 mm front fork and rear shock are used on the RC 390.

KTM added a racing version of the RC 390, the RC 390 Cup for use by motorcycle racers ages 13 to 21 in the ADAC Junior Cup, a MotoGP event. The RC 390 Cup has no lights or mirrors, and no ABS to reduce weight, and an upgraded WP suspension, fully adjustable front and rear. The engine is detuned to a 38 hp (28 kW) with a block-off plate, and has an Akrapovič exhaust.

Motorcycle Consumer News test results of the RC 390's power were 30.04 kW (40.29 hp) @ 8,600 rpm and 32.92 N⋅m (24.28 ft⋅lb) torque @ 6,800 rpm, with a wet weight of 165.3 kg (364.5 lb) They found a top speed of 169.0 km/h (105.0 mph), with an acceleration from 0 to 1/4 mi (0.00 to 0.40 km) in 14.02 seconds at 147.87 km/h (91.88 mph), 0 to 97 km/h (0 to 60 mph) in 4.34 seconds, and braking from 97 to 0 km/h (60 to 0 mph) in 43.1 m (141.3 ft). The tested fuel economy was 4.17 L/100 km; 67.7 mpg_{‑imp} (56.4 mpg_{‑US}).

Cycle World's road tests of the RC 390 also showed a top speed of 169 km/h (105 mph), but faster acceleration 0 to 1/4 mi (0.00 to 0.40 km) in 13.67 seconds at 147.87 km/h (91.88 mph), and from 0 to 97 km/h (0 to 60 mph) in 4.6 seconds. Braking performance and fuel economy were not so far off, at 97 to 0 km/h (60 to 0 mph) in 43.1 m (141.3 ft), and 4.1 L/100 km; 70 mpg_{‑imp} (58 mpg_{‑US}). Cycle Worlds's tested power figure was 29.9 kW (40.1 hp) @ 8,600 rpm, and torque was 34.4 N⋅m (25.4 ft⋅lb).

Motorcycle USA measured acceleration from 0-60 mph in 4.9 seconds and 0 to 1/4 mi (0.00 to 0.40 km) in 14.21 seconds for 2015 model. Braking distance was measured at 148.2 feet from 60-0 mph with ABS disabled and 151.7 feet without ABS disabled.

It has a kickstand sensor but does not have Combined ABS, cornering lights, adaptive brake light, or engine braking control.

As a feature, it has no keyless ignition but only optional immobiliser key and alarm system.

=== 2017 update ===
KTM revised the RC 390 in 2017 by adding a slipper clutch, adjustable brake levers, ride-by-wire throttle, a larger 320 mm front brake rotor, larger mirrors, and some cosmetic and ergonomic changes.

=== 2020 update ===
The bike was made BS6 compliant and a new color option was offered.

=== 2022 update ===
Cornering ABS and a traction control system were added. Increased fuel capacity to 3.61 gallons. A bi-directional quickshifter is optional.

== 390 Enduro/Adventure ==
KTM 390 Enduro/Adventure
- 2027 390 Adventure R
- Manufacturer: Bajaj Auto and KTM
- Production: 2020–present
- Assembly: India and Philippines
- Class: Dual Sport/Adventure Touring
- Engine: 398.7 cc (24.33 cu in) single
- Bore / stroke: 89 mm × 64 mm (3.5 in × 2.5 in)
- Power: 33 kW (44 hp) @ 9,600 rpm
- Torque: 39.0 N⋅m (28.8 ft⋅lb) @ 7,000 rpm
- Ignition type: Bosch digital
- Transmission: Multi-plate wet clutch (slipper (2025–present), 6-speed, X-ring chain

The KTM 390 Adventure is an Adventure Touring motorcycle produced by KTM, first introduced in 2020. It was essentially the 373 cm^{3}, 390 Duke with added features and refined dimensions. The engine produced approximately 31 kW (43 hp) at 9,000 rpm; maximum torque was 37 Nm at 7,000 rpm. Power was transmitted to the rear wheel via a 6-speed gearbox and a chain. From 2020 to 2023 it came with 19" front and 17" rear cast aluminum rims. The suspension consists of a 43 mm WP upside-down fork and a monoshock rear suspension system, both of which are adjustable. The 2024 Adventure had 19/17 wire spoked wheels. The speed, rpm, gear, and fuel level of the KTM 390 Adventure were displayed on a TFT display. Other features include cornering ABS, dynamic traction control, and Bluetooth connectivity to a smartphone. The motorcycle was available in orange and black or gray and white. One particular 390 Adventure, assembled in January 2023 at the Indian cooperation partner Bajaj Auto, was the 1,000,000th KTM motorcycle made since production began there in 2007.

In 2025, KTM replaced the 390 Adventure in the lineup with the 390 Adventure X, now sporting the new 398.6 cm^{3} LC4c motor. The Adventure X is a stripped down version of the more well equipped KTM 390 Adventure R. The X gets 19-inch front and 17-inch rear cast wheels.

The KTM 390 Enduro R is a dual-sport bike released in 2025 sporting the new 398.6 cm^{3} LC4c motor previously introduced in the 390 Duke. Premimum features include better seated and standing positions, a 4.2” TFT display, electronic fuel injection, ride-by-wire throttle, a balancer shaft, slipper clutch, traction control (street / offroad) and ABS. The redesigned "trellis" frame and improved subframe allows for 21"/18" wire spoke wheels and a 35 inch seat height.

The Dual Sport version of the 390 designated as the 390 Enduro R and the Adventure Touring versions designated the 390 Adventure R and 390 Adventure X are all derived of the 390 Duke. The differences between the street-biased X and off-road-focused R primarily involves the wheels, tires, and suspension. Each model has tires suitable for the bikes intended use.
