= X-Ring =

In mechanics:

- X-ring, type of mechanical gasket similar to O-ring

In transmissions:

- X-ring chain, A roller chain commonly used in high performance motorcycles.

In other fields:

- X-ring, ring awarded to students of St. Francis Xavier University

In archery:

- X-ring, also known as the inner 10 ring, serves as a tiebreaker.
