= KTM 690 series =

The KTM 690 series is a range of single cylinder 4-stroke motorcycles made by KTM. The 690's roots are in the first generation LC4 KTM 600GS from 1987. The follow-on 1994 KTM 620 Duke and the 1997 KTM 620 EGS/Adventure, both 620 models, were actually 609 cm^{3}. 1998 saw both changing their model designation to 640 and introduced the 640 Supermoto with a 625 cm^{3} motor shared between them. In 2008 the KTM 640 Adventure R was replaced by the KTM 690 Enduro. Also in 2008, the Duke, SMC and Enduro R models were designated 690 even though the actual displacement of the LC4 motor was 654 cm^{3}. In the 2011–2012 timeframe all 690s were increased to 690 cm^{3}.

== 690 Enduro R ==
KTM 690 Enduro R
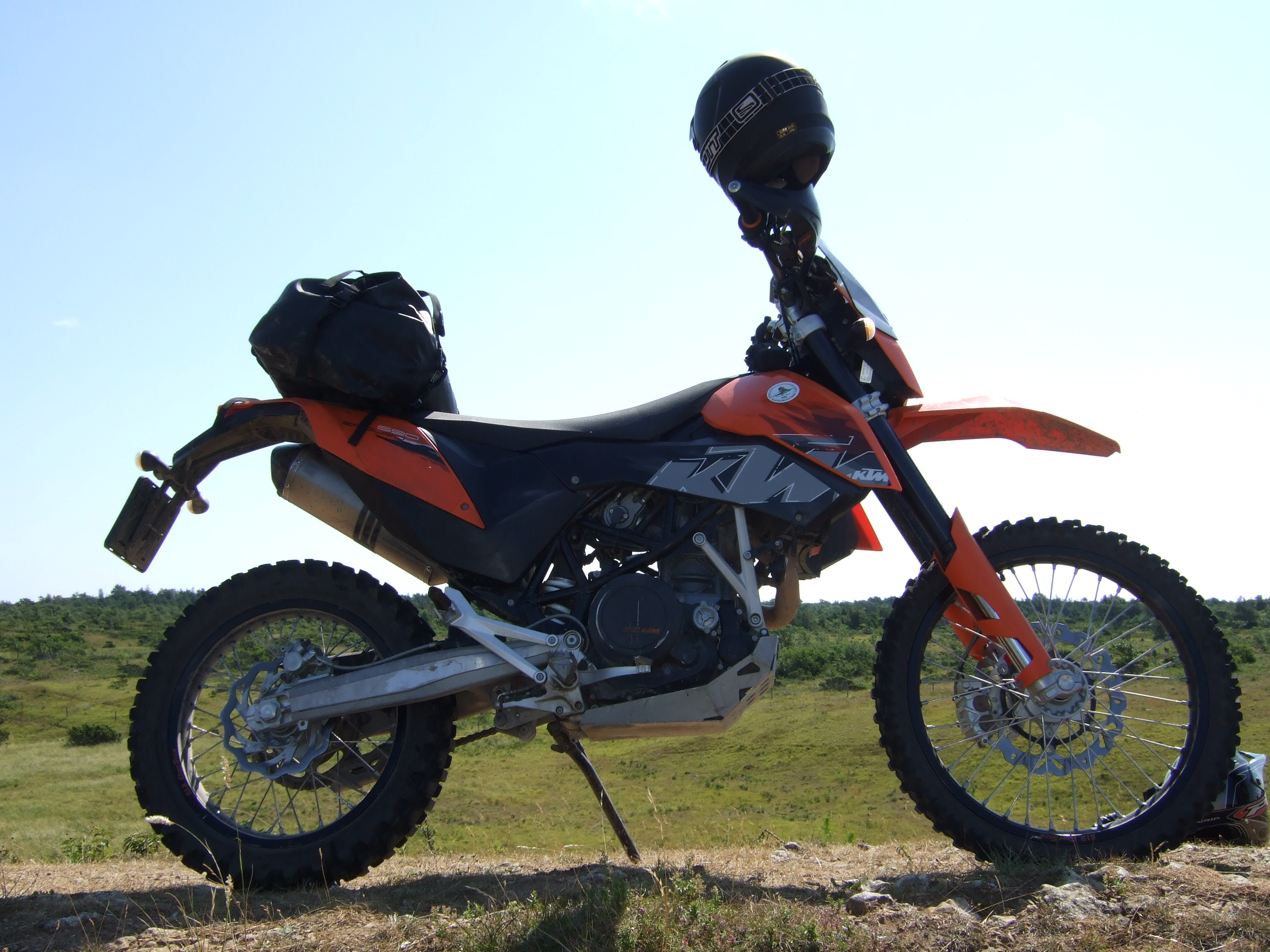
- Manufacturer: KTM
- Production: 2008–present
- Predecessor: KTM 640 Adventure
- Engine: LC4 Single cylinder, 4-stroke, Keihin electronic fuel injection & ignition, pressurized semi-dry sump lubrication via twin Eaton-type oil pumps
- Bore / stroke: 102 × 80mm (2008 to 2011), 102 × 84.5mm (2012 to 2018), 105 × 80mm (2019 onwards)
- Transmission: 6 gears, dog clutch engagement, hydraulically operated APTC slipper clutch
- Frame type: 41xx alloy steel trellis frame, powder coated
- Brakes: Front: Brembo two piston, floating caliper, 300 mm disc Rear: Brembo single piston, floating caliper, 240 mm disc
- Tires: 90/90-21" front; 140/80-18" rear
- Rake, trail: 27.7°/120 mm
- Wheelbase: 1506 ± 15 mm (59.3 ± 0.59")
- Seat height: 935 mm (36.8 in)
- Weight: 162 kg (357 lb) (wet)
- Fuel capacity: 12 L (2.6 imp gal; 3.2 US gal) (2008 to 2018), 13.5 L (3.0 imp gal; 3.6 US gal) (2019 onwards), 2.5 L (0.55 imp gal; 0.66 US gal) reserve
- Related: KTM 390 Enduro R
- Ground clearance: 265 mm (10.4 in)

The KTM 690 Enduro is a dual-sport motorcycle made by KTM from 2008 to the present day. It was introduced for the 2008 model year as a direct replacement for the 625 cm^{3} 640 Adventure R. The 690 Enduro R, introduced in 2009, was initially marketed as a more offroad-oriented version of the adventure-touring-oriented 690 Enduro. The 690 Enduro nomenclature was dropped in 2011; the 690 Enduro R remains in serial production as of the 2027 model year.

The 690 Enduro R occupies a niche market. No direct equivalents or competitors are currently made by any other motorcycle manufacturer that are not owned by the KTM parent company. In its overall role in the class (as an enduro/adventure motorcycle) it has a lower than normal weight, a considerably larger than typical single-cylinder four-stroke engine, and a higher than normal Power-to-weight ratio. The 690 Enduro R was closest in spirit to the alloy-framed, liquid-cooled Honda XR650R(discontinued in 2007). The 690 is considered superior in performance and features to the other bikes in the class except for its siblings the Husqvarna 701 Enduro and GasGas ES 700. Others in the class are the (less expensive) Honda XR650L, Kawasaki KLR650's and Suzuki DR650S.

All 690 Enduro and Enduro R models use an epoxy-coated lattice-type frame made of welded chrome-molybdenum steel tubing. Unlike most other enduro-class or offroad sports motorcycles, KTM 690 Enduro variants do not have a conventional rear subframe of metal tubing. Instead, the rear-mounted, moulded polyethylene fuel tank has a double role as the rear subframe, carrying the seat, battery and rear bodywork.

=== Enduro model timeline ===
In 1997 KTM introduced the 620 EGS/Adventure. Based on the 620 RXC, it was equipped with a carbureted, 609 cm^{3} single cylinder four-stroke motor, a large fuel tank and 21"/18" wire spoked wheels. The bike received a new LC4 625 cm^{3} motor for the 1998 model year and was renamed the 640 Adventure-R. Over its life the bike received multiple changes and upgrades to the bodywork, breaks and color schemes.

This timeline focuses on KTM 690 Enduro and Enduro R models produced from 2008 to the present day, as well as badge-engineered variants sold with Husqvarna and Gas Gas branding.

=== 2008 ===
The 690 Enduro was initially released as a dedicated adventure-touring motorcycle. In spite of its model name implying an engine capacity of 690 cm^{3}, it featured a 654 cm^{3} engine developing 64 BHP. In line with its anticipated role of adventure touring, the Enduro featured a comprehensive instrument cluster with tachometer, and 250 mm suspension travel front and rear. WP Suspension 4860 MXMA forks and a 4618 shock absorber were standard fitment.

=== 2009–2010 ===
Only colour and graphic changes were made to the 690 Enduro for the 2009 model year. Simultaneously with continued production of the 690 Enduro, the 690 Enduro R was released in parallel. In anticipation of more rigorous offroad usage than the Enduro, the Enduro R's front and rear suspension travel was increased from 250 mm to 275 mm front and rear. The Enduro R also featured a different instrument cluster with no tachometer, a differently profiled lightweight headlight, and a front fender more accommodating of water and mud splashes. Visually, Enduro Rs of any generation are most easily distinguishable from Enduros by their main frame colour. Enduro Rs have orange frames, while Enduro frames are black.

=== 2011 ===
For the 2011 model year, the Enduro was discontinued. The Enduro R remained in production, with no changes from the 2010 model.

=== 2012–2013 ===
In 2012, The Enduro R received its first facelift. Colours and graphics changed, and the front side panels were slightly restyled. The overall specification of the 2012 Enduro R reverted mostly to that used on the 2010 Enduro. The offroad-style instrument cluster was replaced by the comprehensive instrument cluster with tachometer, the minimalist headlight was replaced by the original Enduro headlight, and in an effort to lower the overall seat height (and thus make the motorcycle accessible to a greater base of riders), front and rear suspension travel was reduced from 275 mm to 250 mm. Engine displacement was increased from 654 cm^{3} to 690 cm^{3} by re-configuring the bore and stroke from 102/80 mm to 102/84.5 mm, and compression was increased from 11.8:1 to 12.5:1. This resulted in a power increase from 64 HP to 68 HP. Oil and oil filter changes were extended from 7 500 km to 10 000 km.

=== 2014–2018 ===
For the 2014 year, colours and graphics were changed. The engine was updated to make it compliant with EURO 4 emissions regulations. The necessary changes included a dual-spark ignition system, ride-by-wire throttle, and software-based 'locking' of the engine ECU to prevent engine map alterations by enthusiasts. Two-channel ABS with On and Off modes was fitted to all Enduro Rs as standard. A plug-in dongle was made available that allowed the ABS system to be disabled indefinitely for offroad use, and a gear-position readout option was added to the instrument cluster. From 2015 to 2018, the Enduro R remained unchanged from its 2014 specification. The Husqvarna 701 Enduro, the first of two badge-engineered KTM 690 Enduro Rs, was released for the 2016 model year.

=== 2019–2020 ===
In 2019, The Enduro R received its second facelift. This comprised all-new bodywork based on the styling of KTM's EX-C models, and a new seat, with seat height reduced to 910mm to further accommodate riders with shorter inseams. With Husqvarna having been a fully-owned subsidiary of KTM for some time, a push was made to increase commonality across KTM and Husqvarna models. As part of this drive, the improved engine first fitted to Husqvarna 701 models was fitted to all KTM 690 models. Engine displacement was increased from 690 cm^{3} to 693 cm^{3} by re-configuring the bore and stroke from 102/84.5 mm to 105/80 mm, and compression was increased from 12.5:1 to 12.7:1. This resulted in a power increase from 68 HP to 74 HP. A second balance shaft, located in the forward portion of the cylinder head, was also added. The WP Suspension 4860 MXMA forks and 4618 shock absorber used on earlier models were replaced with WP Suspension XPLOR 5448 forks and an XPLOR 5746 shock absorber. Traction control, and a quickshifter allowing clutchless upshifts, were fitted as standard equipment. The ABS system also received an upgrade, with a 'Cornering ABS' function and an 'Offroad mode' that disables ABS functionality on the rear wheel added. The Husqvarna 701 Enduro's fuel tank was also fitted to the 690 Enduro R, resulting in a tank size increase from 12 litres to 13.5 litres. The KTM-pattern instrument cluster was dropped in favour of the Husqvarna 701 instrument cluster, which is similar in pattern and operation to the instrument clusters fitted to 690 Enduro Rs made between 2009 and 2011.

=== 2021–2022 ===
For the 2021 year, colours and graphics were changed, and the engine was updated to make it compliant with EURO 5 emissions regulations. The instrument cluster was updated to include a digital tachometer, and gear-position readout. The Gas Gas ES700, the second of two badge-engineered KTM 690 Enduro Rs, was released for the 2022 model year.

=== 2023–2024 ===
For the 2023 year, colours and graphics were changed, and a more durable LCD instrument cluster was introduced in an attempt to cure a known instrumentation breakage issue.

=== 2025–2026 ===
The 690 was not offered for model year 2025 but returned with many changes for 2026. The front suspension gained travel to 10.4 inches. Chassis flex was altered, a skid plate and mount points for a centerstand were added as well as an LED headlight and revised bodywork. Additional updates include a new color 4.2" TFT display, a USB-C charge port. Also, traction control features such as Motorcycle Traction Control and cornering ABS and a disengagable off-road ride mode. A new (optional) rally mode adds 0-9 slip adjust, dynamic slip adjust and motor slip regulation.

=== 2027 ===
For 2027 the LC4 engine is updated with a new clutch cover and new stator cover, modified crankcase and an improved engine oiling system. Service intervals and oil changes have been increased to 15,000 km.

== 690 Duke ==
KTM 690 Duke
- Manufacturer: KTM
- Also called: 620/640/690/690 or I/II/III/IV
- Assembly: Austria
- Predecessor: Duke 640
- Successor: KTM 790 Duke
- Class: Supermoto or Naked
- Engine: 693 cc (42.3 cu in) LC4 single
- Bore / stroke: 105.0 mm × 80.0 mm (4.13 in × 3.15 in)
- Compression ratio: 12.6:1
- Top speed: 183.5–188.1 km/h (114.0–116.9 mph)
- Power: 73 bhp (54 kW) at 8,000 rpm 75 bhp (56 kW) for R
- Torque: 74 N⋅m (55 lbf⋅ft)
- Ignition type: Digital, 3 modes twin spark
- Transmission: 6-speed, chain drive, slipper clutch
- Frame type: Steel trellis with aluminium swingarm
- Suspension: Front-WP 43 mm (1.7 in) inverted forks Rear-WP linkage-actuated gas charged shock adjustable spring preload
- Brakes: Front-Single Brembo M50 four-piston radial-mounted caliper, 320 mm (13 in) rotor, Bosch 2-channel ABS; Rear-240 mm (9.4 in) floating single-piston caliper
- Tires: Metzeler MR77; Front-120/70-17; Rear-160/60-17
- Wheelbase: 1,470 mm (58 in)
- Seat height: 865 mm (34.1 in)
- Weight: 149.5 kg (330 lb) (dry); 160 kg (350 lb) (wet)
- Fuel capacity: 13.5 L (3.0 imp gal; 3.6 US gal)
- Related: KTM Duke series, KTM 390 series, KTM 690 Duke

The KTM Duke 690 R was a Naked bike offered until 2017. The Duke 690 v.III was available from 2008 to 2011. The Duke 690 v.IV was a 2012 model closely followed by the 2013 Duke 690 R. The Duke 690 R was replaced by the KTM 790 Duke in 2018.

=== Duke model timeline ===
Developed for KTM's line of midrange single-cylinder supermoto, or naked motorcycles it began with the 1994 LC4 609 cm^{3} displacement Duke 620 or Duke I, not imported to the US in 1995 but available on-and-off through 1999. It was followed by the 1998 625 cm^{3} Duke 640 or Duke II, introduced to the US market in MY2000 and available through 2003. Next followed by the 654 cm^{3} Duke III, introduced in 2008 but missing from the US market in 2011. Finally the 690 cm^{3} Duke IV (2012–2019). Both the Duke III and Duke IV were called the 690 Duke

=== 2008 ===
The launch of the 690 Duke III was a huge step forward debuting the liquid cooled 654 cm^{3}, single cylinder engine with a counterbalancer shaft to reduce vibration. This model also produced KTMs first attempt at a ride-by-wire throttle which added ECU maps for soft, standard and advanced modes. The throttle maps allowed for different power delivery and peak power to accommodate varying surface conditions.

=== 2010 ===
The bike is still basically a supermoto bike with street tires

=== 2013 ===
The 690 Duke was not available in the North American market for the 2011 and 2012 model years. KTM refreshed the 690 Duke IV in 2012, but only for the European market. For 2013 the bike saw a massive (~90%) upgrade. The displacement was increased to legitimately 690 cm^{3}. Geometry changes produced a dry weight of 330 lbs (149.5 kh), as well as a lower, more comfortable riding position than the previous version, more in line with the naked bike concept. The 14-litre fuel tank and bodywork were reshaped for a more streamlined profile. KTM updated the ride-by-wire throttle actuation to improve fuel economy, a slipper clutch, and dual spark plugs which are controlled independently via the ignition system and a gear sensor to allow mapping for each gear. The exhaust was redesigned and added a catalytic converter. The wheelbase was unchanged from 1,450 mm (57 in) and the seat was widened and lowered from 34 to 32.9 inches. The bike was also given (front only) ABS breaking.

=== 2016 ===
The new 690 Duke receives an improved 693 cm^{3} motor with a bore and stroke change from 102/84.5 mm to 105/80 mm for a compression ratio of 12.7:1, 73 hp and 55 lb.-ft. of torque as well as an extra counter-balancer shaft. It has updated Ride Mode Technology (RMT) for sport, street and rain (setable while in motion). Traction control (TC) and ABS can be turned off. The claimed dry weight is 327 lbs. A full-color TFT display replaces the LCD of 2015.

=== 2017 ===
New for the 2017 model year is the upspec'd KTM 690 Duke R with the more over-square 75 hp moto. It has fully adjustable KTM WP suspension, and Motorcycle Stability Control (MSC) that incorporates a lean angle sensor’s input.

=== 2018 ===
The 690 Duke is discontinued and replaced by the 790 Duke LC8c parallel twin.

== 690 Supermoto ==
In 1998 KTM introduced the 640 Supermoto as a separate more race oriented version of the Duke. In 2008 the 690 SMC replaced the 640 SC and came with the new 654 cm^{3} LC4 motor. The 2026 KTM 690 SMC R continues to be available with the latest version of the LC4 motor and KTM ride assist features with an optional Supermoto ABS mode. The 690 SMC R competes for market share with the Ducati Hypermotard 698 Mono .

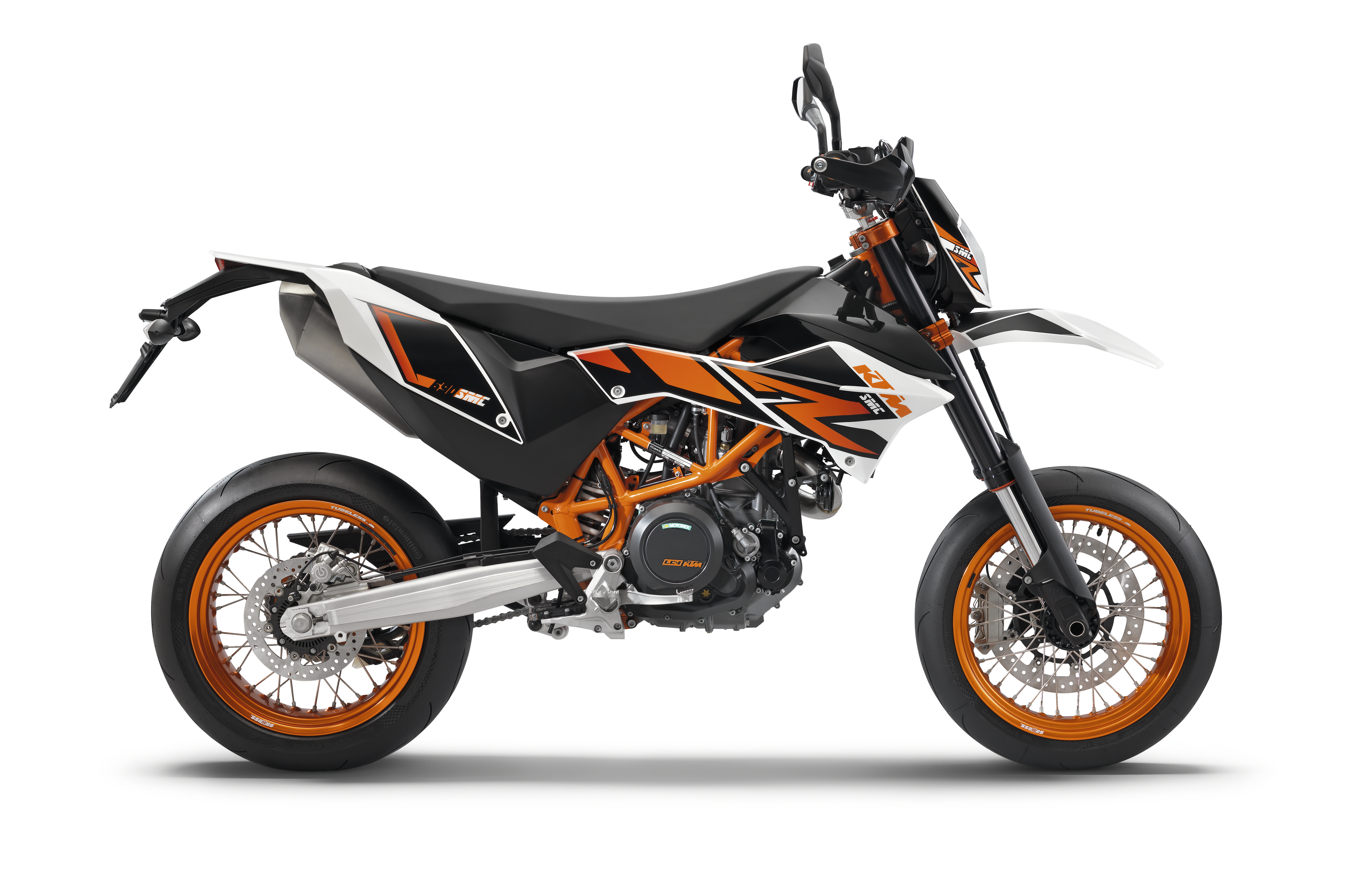
2008 KTM 690 SMC R

=== Supermoto model timeline ===
Developed alongside the Duke and the Enduro models.

== Variants ==
=== 690 Rally Factory Replica ===
The 690 Enduro was used as a base to develop the 2008 690 Rally Factory Replica. This was a privateer rally raid special based on KTM's contemporary 654 cm^{3}-engined rally raid motorcycle, and homologated for FIM events. In place of the 690 Enduro's EURO-compliant electronic fuel injection system, the Replica used a Keihin FCR-MX 41 carburettor and more aggressive camshaft, allowing the engine to develop 25% more power than the 690 Enduro it was based on. The 690 Rally Factory Replica was made available in limited numbers for the 2008, 2009 and 2010 racing seasons before an FIM rule change necessitated its replacement with KTM's 450 Rally Factory Replica.

=== Other LC4-engined KTM models ===
KTM's 690 Duke, 690 SMC and SMC R, and discontinued 690 Supermoto models, all use the same 654 cm^{3}, 690 cm^{3} or 693 cm^{3} engine as the equivalent year-model Enduro or Enduro R. The 690 SMC and 690 SMC R also use the same frame, front and rear suspension, plastics and electronics as the equivalent year-model Enduro or Enduro R, differing only in wheel and tyre, front brake, front fender, and fork triple clamp specifications.

=== Badge engineering ===
With the Husqvarna and Gas Gas brands currently owned by KTM, the 690 Enduro R has been used as a base to produce a number of badge-engineered models. These include Husqvarna's 701 Enduro, 701 Enduro Long-Range (a 701 Enduro with increased fuel capacity), Vitpilen 701 (a naked street bike designed by Kiska's Maxime Thouvenin), and Gas Gas ES700. All current (2019 onwards) Husqvarna 701 Enduro and Gas Gas ES700 variants use the basic KTM 690 Enduro R platform, including engine, transmission, frame, electronics, front and rear suspension, wheels, and brakes.
