= KTM 690 Duke =

Type of motorcycle

The KTM 690 Duke was a motorcycle developed for KTM's line of midrange LC4 single-cylinder engine supermoto, or naked motorcycles that began with the 1994 609 cc (37.2 cu in) displacement Duke 620 or Duke I, followed by the 1998 625 cc (38.1 cu in) Duke 640 or Duke II, followed by the 654 cc (39.9 cu in) Duke III, and finally the 690 cc (42 cu in) Duke IV made since 2012. Both the Duke III and Duke IV are called the 690 Duke

Specifications by model/year
Year	1994–1997	1998–2007	2008–2011	2012	2013	2016–2018
Model	620 Duke I	640 Duke II	690 Duke III	690 Duke IV	690 Duke R	
Displacement	609 cc (37.2 cu in)	624.6 cc (38.12 cu in)	653.7 cc (39.89 cu in)	690 cc (42 cu in)	690 cc (42 cu in)	693 cc (42.3 cu in)
Engine	Liquid cooled, 4-valve SOHC 4 stroke single					
Starting	Kick	Kick & Electric	Electric	Electric & Auto-decompress		
Bore × stroke	101 mm × 76 mm (4.0 in × 3.0 in)	101 mm × 78 mm (4.0 in × 3.1 in)	102.0 mm × 80.0 mm (4.02 in × 3.15 in)	102.0 mm × 84.5 mm (4.02 in × 3.33 in)		105.0 mm × 80.0 mm (4.13 in × 3.15 in)
Compression	10.4:1	11.5:1	11.7:1	12.6:1		
Fuel system	Dell'Orto carburetor (49-state); 38 mm Edelbrock Qwik Silver II (CARB)	Mikuni BST 40mm carburetor	Carburetor (2008); Keihin EFI (2009–2011)	Keihin EFI 3 modes		EFI Keihin 50 mm throttle body
Ignition	Kokusan contactless DC-CDI		Kokusan DC-CDI Digital, 3 Modes, Single Spark plug.	Digital, 3 modes, twin spark		Digital, 3 modes, twin spark
Transmission	5-speed, chain drive		6 speed, chain drive, Slipper Clutch	6-speed, chain drive, slipper clutch		
Frame	Chromoly Steel trellis, aluminum swingarm					
Front brake	Brembo 4-piston caliper, 320 mm disc	Single Brembo four-piston radial caliper, 320 mm disc	Single Brembo four-piston radial caliper, 320 mm disc	Single four-piston radial caliper, 320 mm disc, ABS	Single four-piston Brembo M50 radial caliper, 320 mm disc, ABS	Single Brembo M50 four-piston radial-mounted caliper, 320 mm rotor, Bosch two-channel ABS
Rear brake		Brembo 1-piston caliper, 220 mm disc	Brembo caliper, 240 mm disc	Single four-piston caliper, 240 mm disc		240 mm floating single-piston caliper
Front suspension	WP 4054, Top Adjuster, telescopic fork	WP 43 inverted fork	48 mm WP inverted fork, adjustable preload, compression, rebound, 140 mm (5.6 in) travel	WP inverted fork 135 mm (5.3 in) travel	WP inverted fork, adjustable preload, compression, rebound, 150 mm (5.9 in) travel	WP 4 3mm inverted fork
Rear suspension	WP monoshock 4681 BAVP, Single Adjuster	WP monoshock	WP monoshock, adjustable preload, compression, rebound, Pro-Lever, 140 mm (5.6 in) travel	WP shock, adjustable preload only, 135 mm (5.3 in) travel	WP shock, adjustable preload, compression, rebound, 150 mm (5.9 in) travel	WP linkage-actuated gas-charged shock adjustable spring preload
Wheels	Akront wire-spoke, 17 × 3.5" front 17 × 4.5" rear	17 × 3.5" front 17 × 4.5" rear	17-inch 5 spoke Marchesini forged Alum wheels			17-inch, 10-spoke forged-aluminum
Tires	Pirelli MT60 radial	120/70-17 front 160/70-17 rear	Dunlop Sportmax GPR; 120/70-ZR17 front 160/60-ZR17 rear		Michelin Pilot Power	Metzeler MR77; 120/70-17 front 160/60-17 rear
Rake, trail		26.5°, 109 mm (4.3 in)	26.5°, 115 mm (4.53 in)	26.5°		
Wheelbase		1,460 mm (57 in)	1,470 mm (57.9 in)			
Seat height	890 mm (35 in)	900 mm (35 in)	876 or 895 mm (34.5 or 35.25 in)	835 mm (32.9 in)	865 mm (34.1 in)	
Dry weight		152 kg (335 lb)	151 kg (334 lb)	149.5 kg (330 lb) (claimed)		
Wet weight	150 kg (340 lb)	161 kg (355 lb)	160.6 kg (354.0 lb)	160 kg (352 lb) (claimed)		
Fuel capacity	10.3 L (2.3 imp gal; 2.7 US gal)	11.5 L (2.5 imp gal; 3.0 US gal)	13.5 L; 2.97 imp gal (3.57 US gal)			
Performance
Power		40 kW (54 bhp) @ 7,000 rpm	44.5–45.9 kW (59.7–61.6 hp) @ 7,600 rpm	50 kW (67 hp) (claimed)	51.5 kW (69.1 hp) (claimed)	54 kW (73 hp) (claimed)
Torque	60 N⋅m (44 lb⋅ft) @ 5,500 rpm		62.31–65.08 N⋅m (45.96–48.0 lb⋅ft) @ 5,425 rpm		70.1 N⋅m (51.7 lb⋅ft)(claimed)	75 N⋅m (55 lb⋅ft)(claimed)
Fuel consumption		15.4 km/L (44 mpg_{‑imp}; 36 mpg_{‑US})	49.7–51 mpg_{‑US} (4.73–4.61 L/100 km; 59.7–61.2 mpg_{‑imp})			
Top speed	105 mph (169 km/h)	120 mph (190 km/h)	183.5–188.1 km/h (114–116.9 mph)			
0 to 60 mph (0 to 97 km/h) seconds		4.8	3.6–3.92			
0 to 1/4 mi (0.00 to 0.40 km)	13.1 @ 156 km/h (97 mph)		12.28 @ 168.42 km/h (104.65 mph); 12.35 @ 164.09 km/h (101.96 mph)			
Braking 60 to 0 mph (97 to 0 km/h)	36 m (118 ft)		39.3 m (128.9 ft)			
