= KTM LC4 engine =

Liquid cooled four cycle engine

KTM LC4 Engine is series of single cylinder engine designs produced by KTM debuting in 1987. "LC" in the name stands for Liquid Cooled while 4 indicated a 4 valve motor. Starting development in 1982 it was designed to replace air-cooled 4-strokes with an eye toward future emission standards. The first engine introduced was the enduro racing 553 cm^{3} 600GS. The basic LC4 design has gone on to power a range of KTM Motorcycles.

== History ==
The LC4 engine has increased in displacement over the years. The original 600 (553 cm^{3} actual) gave way to the 620 platform (609 cm^{3} actual) which became the 640 series (625 cm^{3} actual) from 1999 onward, then on to the 2008 version of the 690 (654 cm^{3} actual) the 690 v2 (690 cm^{3} actual) to its current 690 v3 (693 cm^{3} actual) size.

Used in various KTM models the LC4 equipped bikes have had various engine size related designations:

- 1987 - 600GS
- 1994 - 620 Duke
- 1997 - 620 EGS/Adventure
- 1998 - 640 Supermoto
- 1998 - 640 Adventure-R
- 2008 - 690 Enduro R
- Other Variants include multiple Badge engineered models

=== 2019 ===
KTM introduces twin balancer shafts with the 690 LC4.

=== 2026 ===
KTM releases the significantly redesigned 690 LC4 increasing the displacement to 692.7 cc (42.27 cu in) with an increases to 77.9 hp (58.1 kW) @8000 rpm and slightly reduced 53.9 ft⋅lb (73.1 N⋅m) of torque @6750 rpm. KTM made these changes, reclaiming the “world’s most powerful” single-cylinder title, in response to the announced specifications for the Ducati Superquadro Mono.

== LC4c ==
In the 2023/24 timeframe KTM designated their new 398.6 cm^{3} motor LC4c.
