= Supermoto of Nations =

Annual supermoto race

FIM Supermoto of Nations
- Sport: Supermoto
- Founded: 2006
- Continent: World
- Most recent champion: Austria
- Most titles: France (13 times)

The FIM Supermoto of Nations, is an annual supermoto event since 2006 organized by the International Motorcycling Federation (FIM). The championship has been won by France 13 times.

== Medallists ==
Year	Location	Gold medal	Silver medal	Bronze medal
2006	(United Kingdom) Belfast	Italy	France	United Kingdom
2007	(Italy) Castrezzato	France	Italy	United Kingdom
2008	(Bulgaria) Pleven	Italy	France	Bulgaria
2009	(Bulgaria) Pleven	Germany	Bulgaria	Finland
2010	(France) Cahors	France	Italy	Germany
2011	(Spain) Alcañiz	France	United Kingdom	Finland
2012	(Portugal) Portimao	Italy	France	Czech Republic
2013	(Bulgaria) Pleven	Italy	Bulgaria	France
2014	(Italy) Cremona	France	Italy	Germany
2015	(Italy) Jesolo	France	Italy	Czech Republic
2016	(Spain) Alcarras	France	Czech Republic	Germany
2017	Tremblay-en-France	France	Germany	Italy
2018	(France) Guadassuar	France	Italy	Czech Republic
2019	Tremblay-en-France	France	France Junior	Italy
2021	Tremblay-en-France	France	Italy	France Junior
2022	(Belgium) Mettet	France	France Junior	Italy
2023	(Italy) Castelleto di Branduzzo	France	Italy	Spain
2024	Tremblay-en-France	France	Austria	Germany
2025	(Czech Republic) Vysoké Mýto	Austria	Germany	Czech Republic
