= KTM 200 Duke =

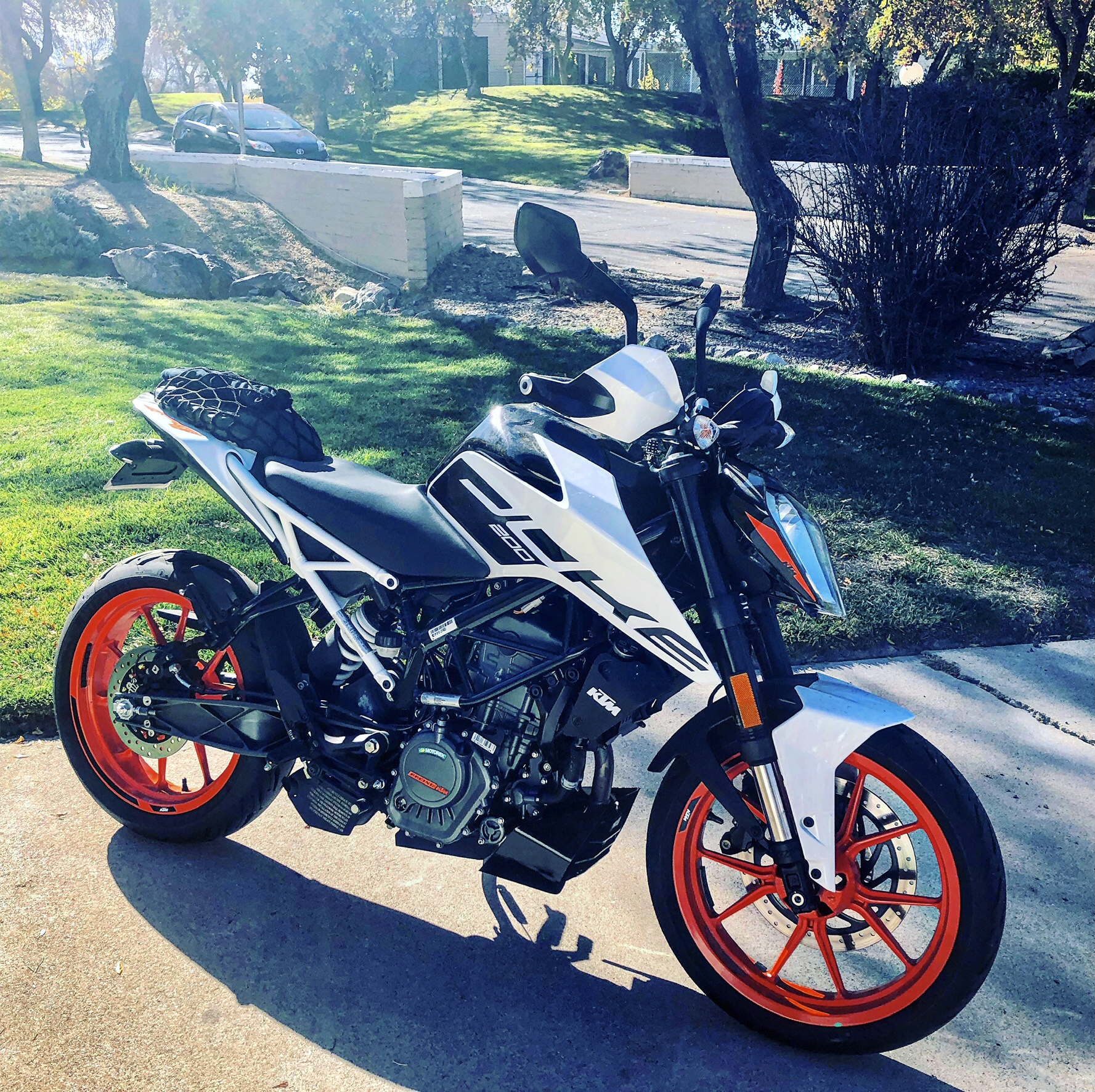
- Manufacturer: KTM, Bajaj Auto
- Parent company: KTM
- Production: 2012–present
- Assembly: India, Colombia, Argentina, Philippines
- Class: Standard
- Engine: 199.5 cc (12.17 cu in), liquid-cooled, four-stroke, 4 valve, DOHC, single
- Bore / stroke: 72 mm × 49 mm (2.8 in × 1.9 in)
- Compression ratio: 11.3:1
- Power: 19 kW (25 hp) @ 10,000 rpm
- Torque: 19.3 N⋅m (14.2 lbf⋅ft) @ 8,000 rpm
- Transmission: 6-speed manual
- Frame type: Trellis
- Suspension: Front: USD, telescopic fork, 43mm dia (WP); Rear: Monoshock
- Brakes: Front: 300mm disc (BYBRE 4-Pot Calliper); Rear: 230mm disc (BYBRE Single Piston)
- Tires: Front: 110/70 R17; Rear: 150/60 R17
- Wheelbase: 1,367 mm (53.8 in)
- Dimensions: L: 2,002 mm (78.8 in); W: 730 mm (29 in); H: 1,274 mm (50.2 in)
- Seat height: 810 mm (32 in)
- Weight: 132 kg (291 lb) (dry)
- Fuel capacity: 10.2 L (2.2 imp gal; 2.7 US gal)
- Oil capacity: 1.4 L
- Related: 390 Duke

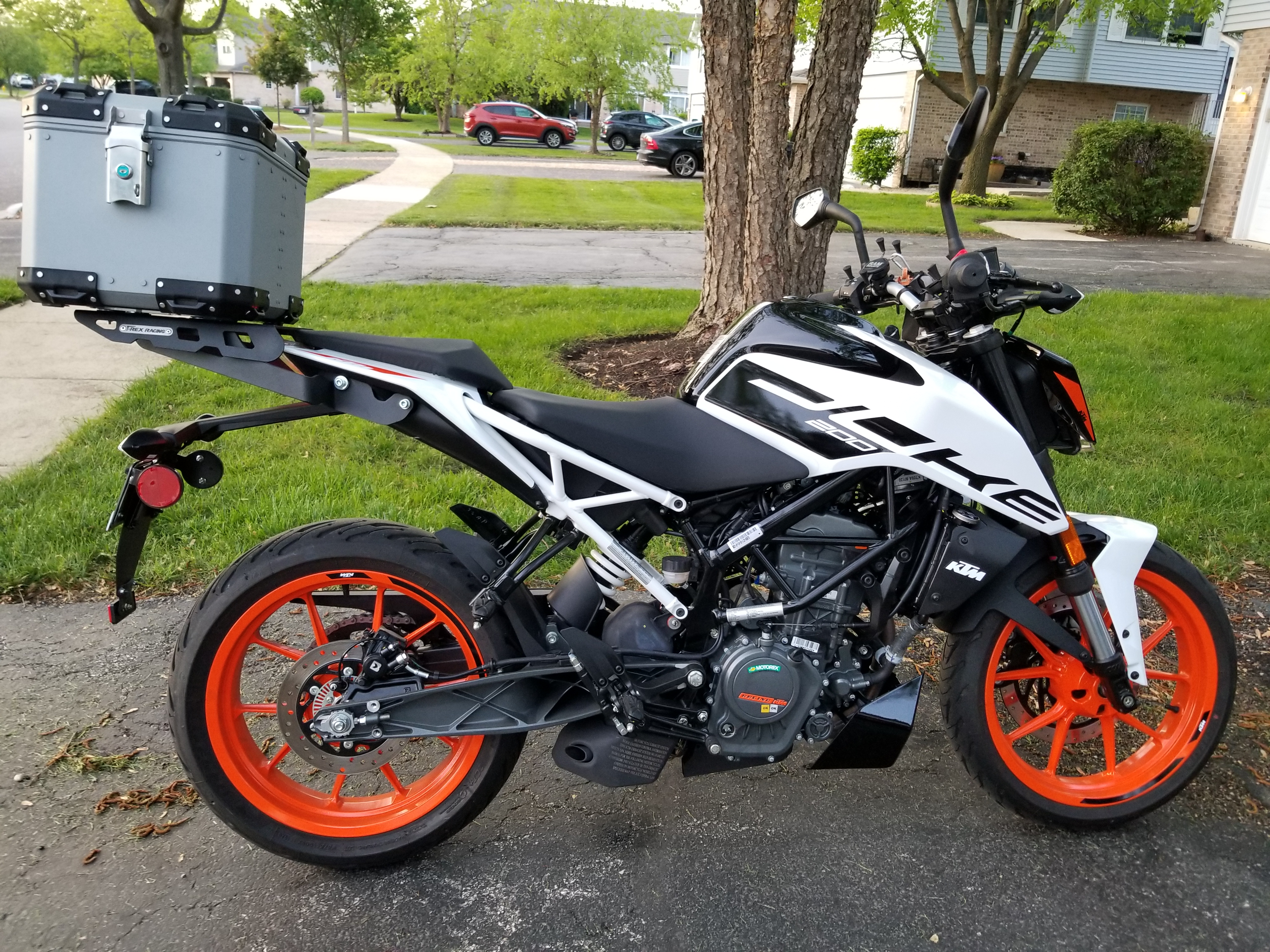
2020 200 Duke

The KTM 200 Duke is a 199.5 cc (12.17 cu in) single-cylinder standard motorcycle made by KTM since 2012 based on the 125 Duke. It has a four-stroke, spark-ignition liquid-cooled engine. It has six-speed gearbox and a cable actuated multi-disc clutch. The bike has an underbelly exhaust and a three-chamber silencer positioned close to its centre of gravity.

The Duke 200 is manufactured at Bajaj Autos Chakan Plant in India. In Colombia, it is being assembled by the company Auteco S.A. In Argentina, is being assembled by the company Simpa S.A. since March 2014. In the Philippines, it is being assembled by the company KTM Asia Motorcycle Manufacturing, Inc. (KAMMI) in Sta. Rosa, Laguna.

In August 2020 the Duke 200 was released in North America after previously only being available in Asian, European and South American markets. It also featured updated styling and few other components coming from Duke 390 to match other Duke models.

== See also ==
- KTM 390
