= O-ring chain =

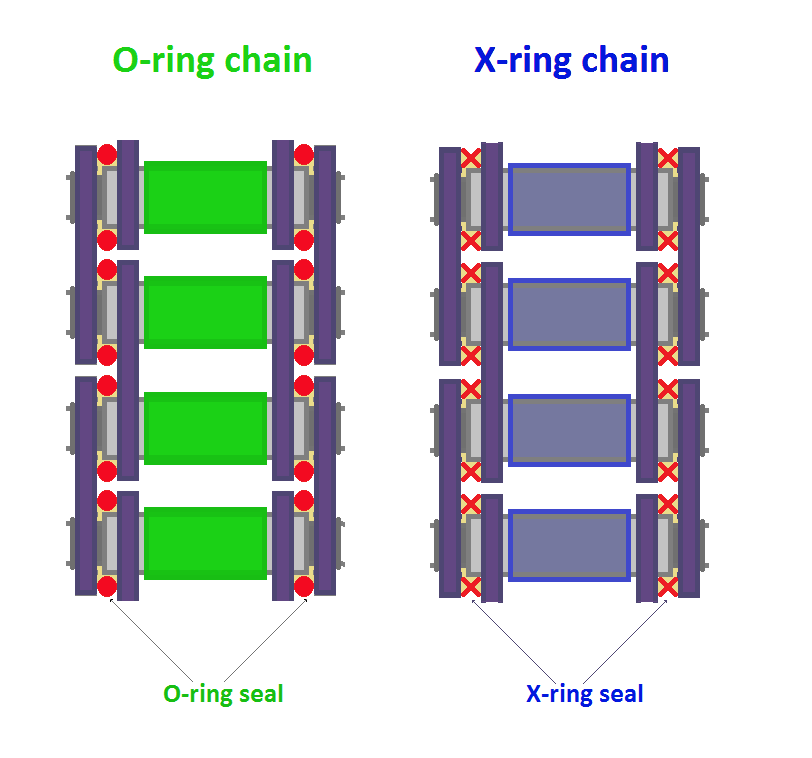
O-ring type chain and X-ring type chain.

The o-ring chain is a specialized type of roller chain used in the transmission of mechanical power from one sprocket to another.

== Construction ==
The o-ring chain is named for the rubber o-rings built into the space between the outside link plate and the inside roller link plates. Chain manufacturers began to include this feature in 1971 after the application was invented by Joseph Montano while working for Whitney Chain of Hartford, Connecticut. O-rings were included as a way to improve lubrication to the links of power transmission chains, a service that is vitally important to extending their working life. These rubber fixtures form a barrier that holds factory applied lubricating grease inside the pin and bushing wear areas. Further, the rubber o-rings prevent dirt and other contaminants from entering the chain linkages, where such particles would otherwise cause significant wear.

== Applications ==
O-ring chains are most notably used in motorcycles, one of the most demanding applications for a metal chain. High rpm and heavy loads require bulky chains, but such engineering increases the effect of friction compared to lighter chains. So lubrication plays a vital role here, but the high rpm also makes it very difficult to keep lubrication inside and on the chain. Additionally, motorcycle chains are exposed to a large volume of contaminants and particles and must be protected. O-rings, as described above, fit this application perfectly.

== See also ==
- X-ring chain
- Roller chain
- Motorcycle transmission
