= Ducati Hypermotard =

Motorcycle model

The Ducati Hypermotard is a supermotard Ducati motorcycle designed by Pierre Terblanche and was first seen at the November 2005 EICMA trade show in Milan. The Hypermotard was awarded "Best of Show" at EICMA and has since won other show awards. The Hypermotard has a 937 cc (57.2 cu in) dual-spark (see 2010 MY revisions) 'Desmo' or 'Desmodromic' liquid-cooled four-valve-per-cylinder 90° V-twin engine with fuel injection and weighs under 180 kg (400 lb). The Hypermotard is capable of speeds in the region of 125 mph (201 km/h).

The rigidly triangulated trellis frame wears 50 mm Marzocchi R.A.C. inverted forks, and has a Sachs/Öhlins remote reservoir shock attached to a strong, single-sided swing arm. The Marchesini racing wheels wear dual radially mounted Brembo four-piston, two-pad brake calipers matched with 305 mm discs up front, and a 245 mm disc with two-piston caliper at the rear.top speed | 137

== History ==
There had been rumours for some time that Ducati would produce a supermotard class bike, which was a growing sector of the market mostly catered-for by the likes of KTM and Husqvarna. The unveiling of the Hypermotard concept was via a dedicated mini-site, linked to from the main Ducati website in March 2006. This apparently caused outages of the whole Ducati website, such was the interest in this distinctive-looking motorcycle.

The mini-site asked visitors to complete an online survey giving their opinion on the Hypermotard, as well as offering the opportunity to vote on configurations such as engine size, brakes and favourite features. The bike was still in concept form at the time and production was not guaranteed, but a subsequent post to the blog of then Ducati CEO Federico Minoli on 31 March 2006 confirmed that it would indeed go into production and also gave some details of the survey results.

Very few changes were made to the prototype to create the first production version, and quirky features such as the 'duck bill' front fender and handguards incorporating LED indicators/folding mirrors made it to the final version. Later blog entries featured some of the concept drawings and these are incredibly close to the finished machine.

In 2008, Greg Tracy won the 1200 Pro Class Division of the Pikes Peak International Hill Climb on a Hypermotard 1100S. It was the first Hypermotard to win an international competition and the first Ducati to win at the Pikes Peak since the race began in 1916.

== Hypermotard 1100 revisions ==
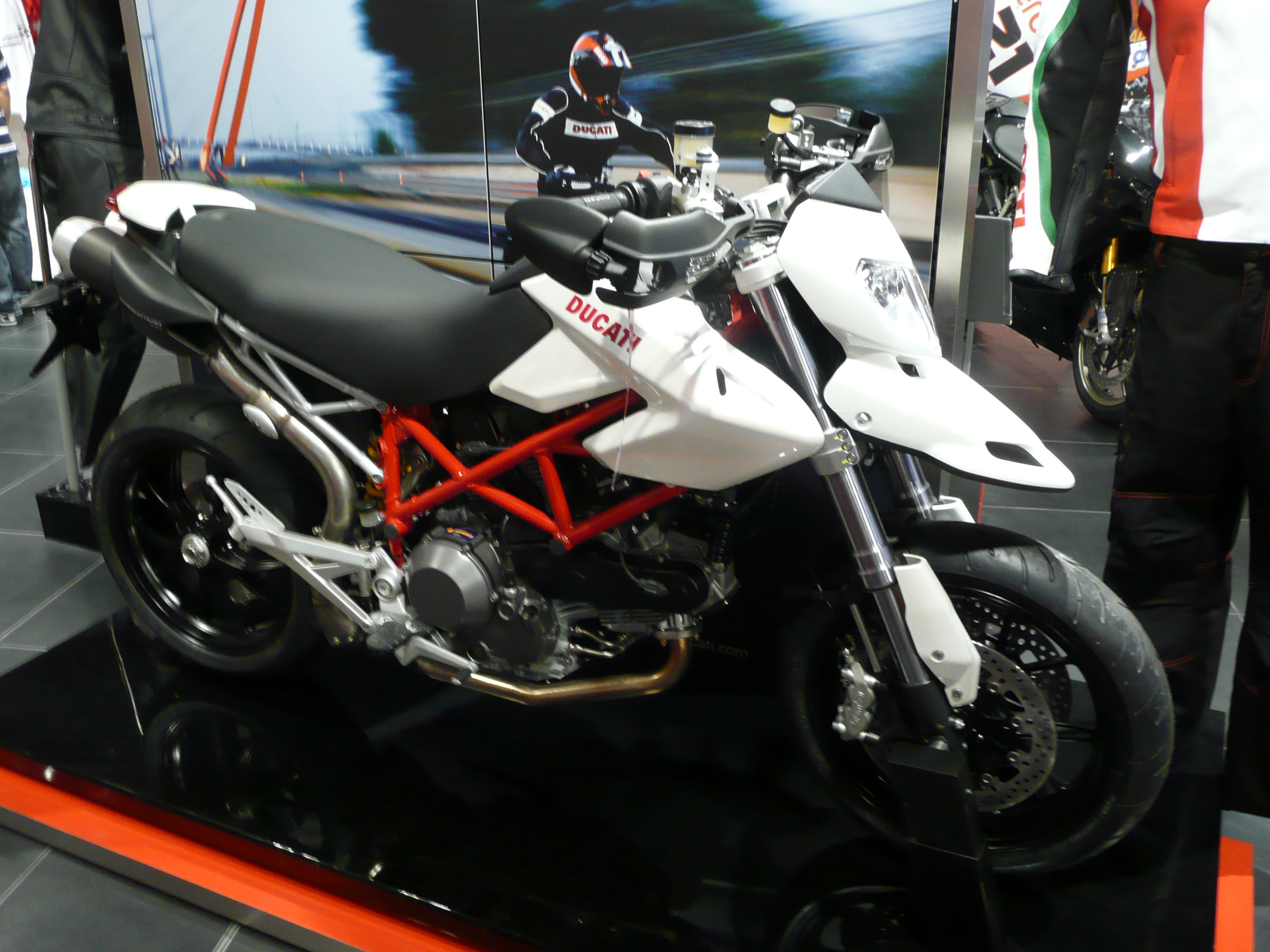
Ducati Hypermotard 1100 MY09

The first 2007 Hypermotard was available in two configurations: the base '1100' model and the higher specification '1100S' model. The more expensive 1100S featured a durable low friction diamond-like carbon (DLC) black coating to the front fork sliders, an Öhlins remote reservoir rear shock, the same Brembo Monobloc brake calipers used on the 1098, lighter forged aluminium Marchesini wheels with a red pin-stripe, Pirelli tires, plus carbon fibre fork protectors, timing belt covers, front mudguard/fender and tail/exhaust side panels. These upgrades made for a 2 kg (4.4 lb) weight saving; 177 kg (390 lb) versus 179 kg (395 lb) for the base model.

The specification remained virtually the same for 2009; however, the 1100S model received 48 mm Kayaba forks (with DLC coating) to replace the 50 mm Marzocchi items, while lower-spec Marzocchi forks continued to be offered on the base model. Also, for 2009 the 1100S model came with Ducati's DDA telemetry/data-logging device and software.

For 2010, the Hypermotard 1100 has been changed enough for the two models to receive new names reflecting the fact that the bike has 'evolved'. The 1100 Evo and the more expensive top-of-the-line 1100 Evo SP feature a redesigned engine which is no longer Dual Spark and has Siemens fuel injection in place of the previous models' Marelli system. The higher-compression engine is said to give 5 bhp (3.7 kW) more, outputting 95 bhp (71 kW) at a slightly lower engine speed of 7,500 rpm. Torque is fractionally lower than it was before at 75.9 lb-ft (10.5kgm), but peak torque appears 1,000 rpm higher in the rev range at 5750 rpm, which Ducati say allows owners to hang on to gears for longer. A new oil cooler has been fitted, with 85% more cooling area than before. The final drive gearing has also changed from 15/42 to 15/41.

The Evo features 50 mm Marzocchi forks and a Sachs rear shock, but the Evo SP features specially developed (1.2") taller 50 mm Marzocchi forks together with an Ohlins adjustable rear shock. The colour of the fork stanchions on both models is now black, the Evo SP also featuring a black DLC coating to the lower fork section. The Evo SP has a seat height of 875 mm (34.4 in) and is deliberately a taller bike because Ducati say that racers were asking for more ground clearance. The Evo, and all previous Hypermotard 1100 models, has a seat height of 845 mm (33.3 in). To complement the increased ride height of the Evo SP, it features handlebars that sit 20 mm higher than those on the base model. The speedometer unit is now similar to that fitted to the Ducati Streetfighter, with white backlighting.

The 2010 Hypermotard 1100 bikes are both considerably lighter than before, mainly due to the vacuum-cast engine casings, lighter crankshaft, flywheel and alternator, but the rear subframe has also been redesigned and both bikes carry some carbon fibre. The Evo SP gets the full complement of carbon fibre, as the 'S' model before it, but a rear hugger is now standard on the SP. The Evo model weighs 172 kg (379 lb) versus 171 kg (377 lb) for the Evo SP, the latter's forged Marchesini alloy wheels making the difference. The Evo has Pirelli Diablo Rosso tyres and the Evo SP has Pirelli Diablo Supercorsa SP. The SP comes with Ducati's DDA device software.

== Custom models ==
In November 2007, NCR announced the production of the 'Leggera', essentially a highly modified Hypermotard which was over 30 kg (66 lb) lighter and had around 40 hp (30 kW) more than the standard bike. It cost several times the asking price of the standard Hypermotard 1100S.

In December 2007, Roland Sands of Roland Sands Design (RSD) was commissioned by Ducati North America to build a custom Hypermotard. The modifications made were mainly cosmetic.

Ducati North America also began offering a Tri-colore special edition Ducati Hypermotard, with a modified racing seat, ECU, and sport exhaust. It was released in the Neiman Marcus Christmas catalog in the Fall of 2008.

== Hypermotard 796 ==
Hypermotard 796
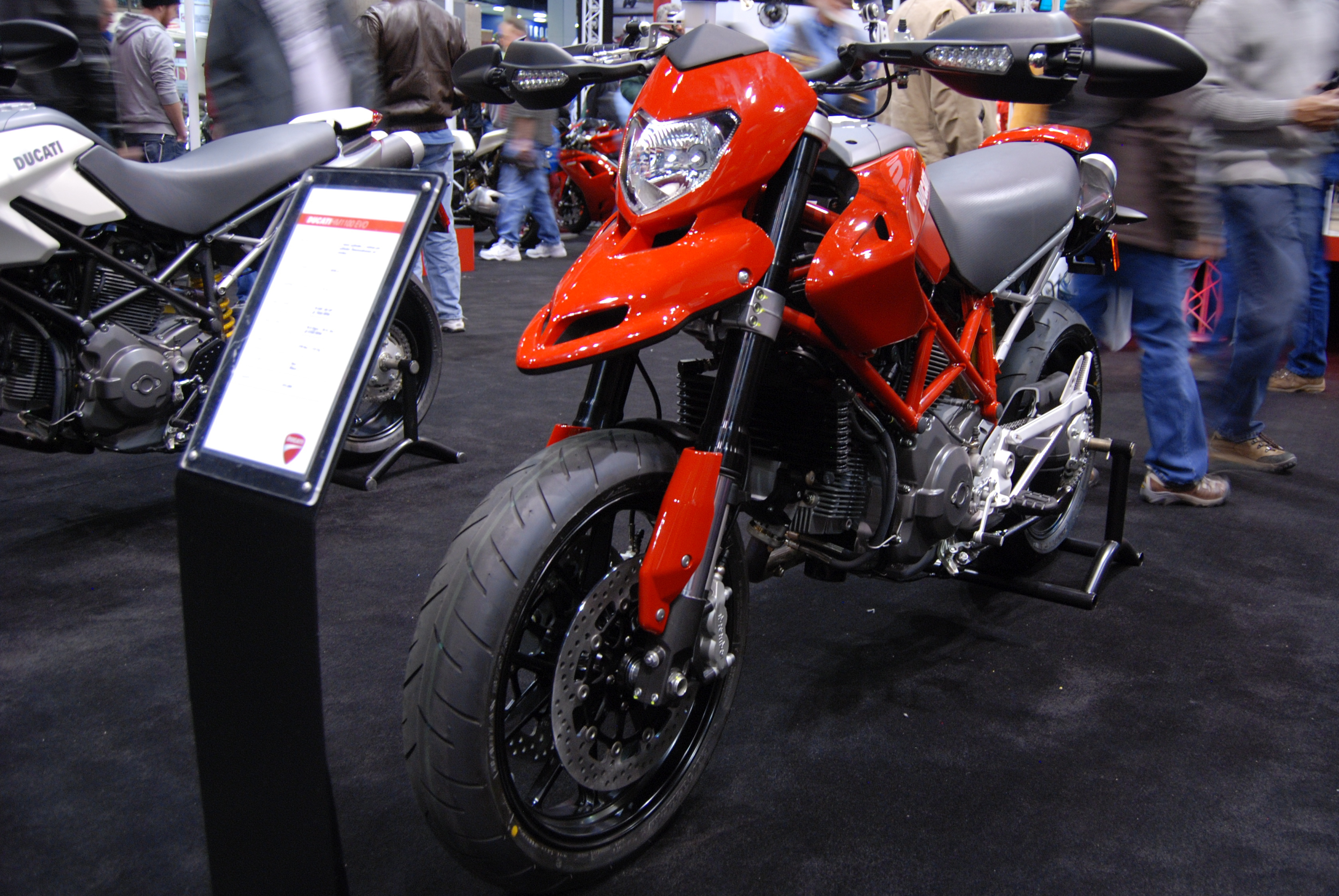
- Manufacturer: Ducati
- Class: Supermotard
- Engine: 803 cc (49.0 cu in) 90° V-twin, air-cooled, 2 valve/cyl. Desmodromic, 11:1 comp.
- Bore / stroke: 88 mm × 66 mm (3.5 in × 2.6 in)
- Power: 81 bhp (60 kW) @ 8000 rpm
- Torque: 55.7lb-ft @ 6,250 rpm
- Transmission: 6-speed, wet hydraulic APTC slipper clutch, chain drive
- Frame type: Steel trellis
- Suspension: Front: Marzocchi 43 mm USD forks, rear: adjustable Sachs monoshock. Aluminium single-sided swingarm
- Brakes: Front: 2 disc Brembo radial caliper, 4 piston, Rear: disc, 2 piston
- Tires: Front: 120/70 ZR17, rear: 180/55 ZR17
- Rake, trail: 24°
- Wheelbase: 1,455 mm (57.3 in)
- Dimensions: L: 2,120 mm (83 in); H: 1,155 mm (45.5 in)
- Seat height: 825 mm (32.5 in)
- Weight: 167 kg (368 lb) (dry)
- Fuel capacity: 12.4 L (3.3 US gal)

In late 2009, Ducati introduced a new Hypermotard model – the 796 – featuring a 20 mm lower seat height (825 mm) and a smaller-capacity, less powerful engine. The 800 cc engine features Siemens fuel injection and is derived from the Monster. Power output is 81 bhp (60 kW), just 9 bhp less than the 2007–2009 1100 models, although torque output is considerably lower.

The 796 has a wet 'slipper' clutch, not a Ducati trademark dry clutch as fitted to the 1100 models. The bike is lighter than any of the 1100 models at 167 kg (368 lb), although the difference is less marked when compared to the 2010 Evo and Evo SP.

Pirelli Diablo Rosso tyres are fitted in the same sizes used on the Hypermotard 1100, but the 796 uses less substantial, non-adjustable 43 mm Marzocchi forks and has Sachs rear suspension. The single-sided swinging arm and fold-out mirrors of the 1100 model are retained. The aluminium wheels are made by Enkei.

The speedometer unit is similar to that fitted to the Ducati Streetfighter, with orange backlighting to differentiate the 796 from the 2010 1100 models.

== 2013 model year ==
Ducati Hypermotard 939/939SP
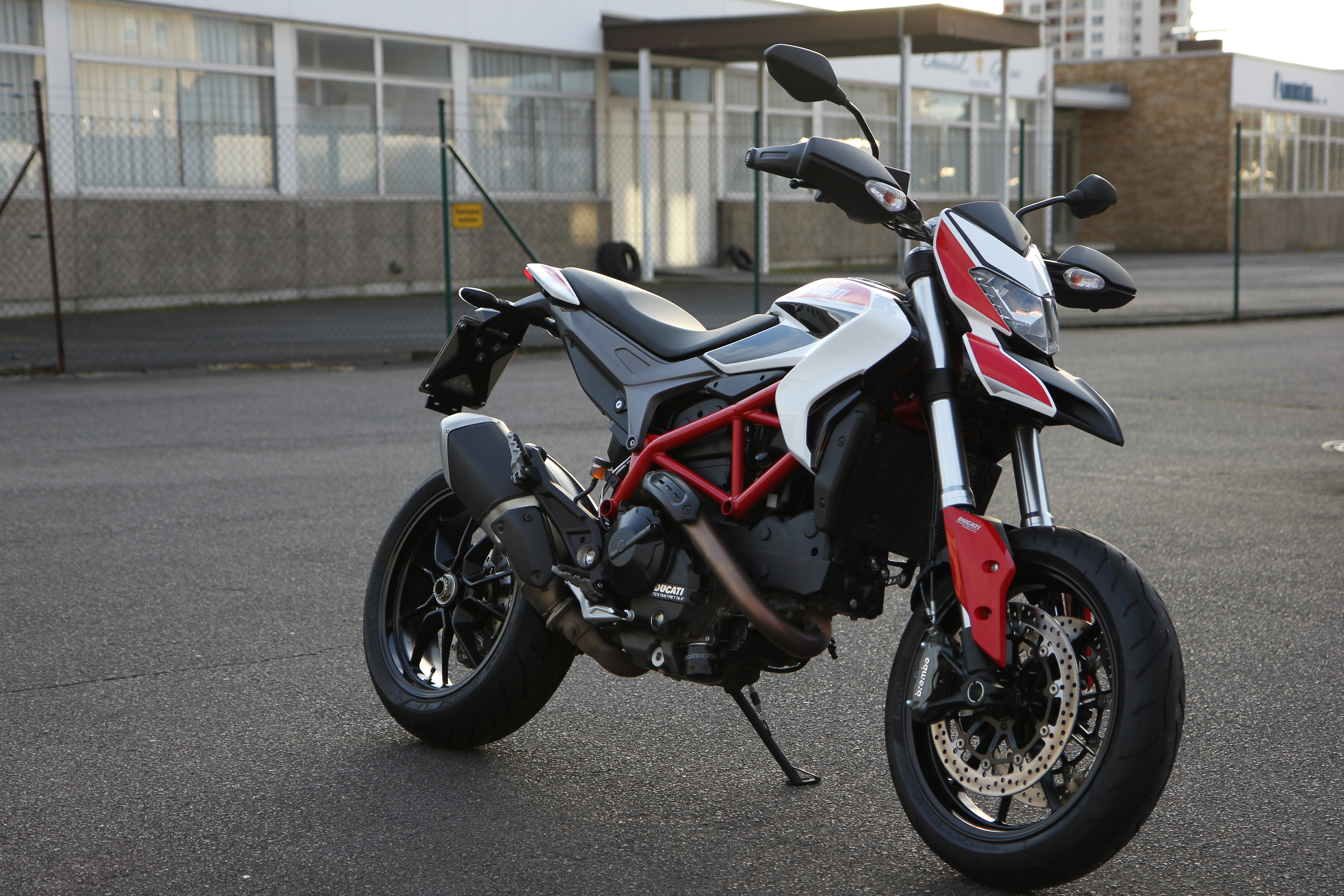
- Ducati Hypermotard
- Manufacturer: Ducati
- Class: Supermotard
- Engine: 937cc Testastretta 11°, L-Twin cylinder, 4 valve per cylinder, Desmodromic, liquid cooled
- Power: 113bhp @ 10000 rpm
- Torque: 72.2 lb-ft @ 8000 rpm
- Transmission: 6 speed, dry hydraulic clutch, chain drive
- Frame type: Tubular steel Trellis frame
- Suspension: 43mm usd forks (939) Ohlins fully adjustable 48mm usd forks (939SP) - front. Progressive linkage with adjustable spring preload and rebound damping Sachs monoshock. (939) Progressive linkage with fully adjustable Ohlins monoshock. (939SP) - rear
- Brakes: 2 x 320 mm semi-floating discs, radially mounted Brembo monobloc callipers, 4-piston 2-pad, radial pump with adjustable lever, Bosch ABS - front, 245 mm disc, 2-piston calliper, Bosch ABS - rear
- Tires: Front: 120/70 ZR17, rear: 180/55 ZR17 (Pirelli Diablo Rosso II - 939/Pirelli Diablo Supercorsa SP - 939SP)
- Rake, trail: 25,5°
- Seat height: 32 inches
- Weight: 392 - 399 lb (dry); 443 - 450 lb (wet)
- Fuel capacity: 4.2gallon (US)

Ducati unveiled the 2013 Ducati Hypermotard lineup in November 2012. The three new models received countless updates from frame, body, suspension, exhaust, electronics and ergonomics.

The base model Hypermotard has a new 11-degree Testastretta 821 cc engine with longer valve service intervals (30,000 km or 19,000 miles), ride-by-wire, traction control and ABS and a 16-litre (3.5 imp gal; 4.2 US gal) fuel tank. The Hypermotard line up also uses a new display and ride-by-wire system allowing riders to switch between different traction/ABS/throttle modes for street, track and rain.

The Hypermotard SP has a slightly lesser weight due to the use of carbon fibre engine and body components, and has higher suspension travel and response similar to the last generation. It also utilises 821 cc engine and lightweight wheels similar to those on the 1199 Panigale S.

== 2019 Model - Present ==
Hypermotard 950 SP
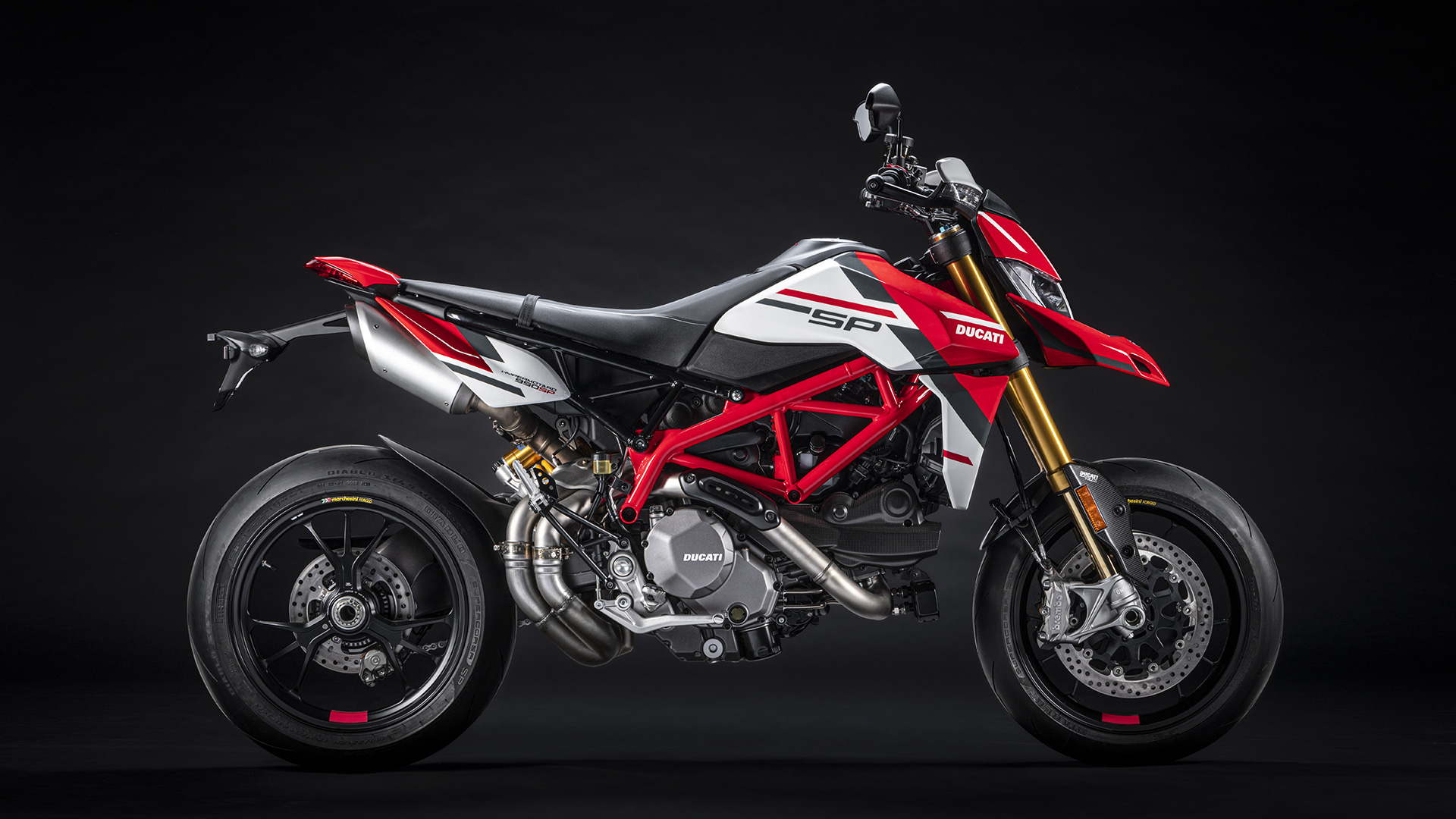
- Manufacturer: Ducati
- Parent company: Audi
- Production: 2019 - Present
- Class: Supermotard
- Engine: 937cc Testastretta 11° L-Twin Liquid Cooled
- Bore / stroke: 94.0 x 67.5 mm (3.7 x 2.7 inches)
- Compression ratio: 13.3:1
- Top speed: Claimed 165 MPH
- Power: 114 hp (84 kW) @ 9.000 rpm
- Torque: 71 lb-ft (96 Nm) @ 7.250 rpm
- Transmission: Quick Shift (DQS) EVO up/down (6 Speed)
- Suspension: 950 SP is equipped with a fully adjustable 48 mm Öhlins fork with 185 mm wheel travel and a fully adjustable Öhlins shock absorber with 175 mm wheel travel.
- Brakes: The front braking system features two monobloc radially-mounted 4-piston Brembo M4.32 callipers operated by a radial brake master cylinder with adjustable 5-position lever.
- Tires: Pirelli Diablo Rosso III tyres, 120/70 ZR17 up front and 180/55/55 ZR17 at the rear.
- Wheelbase: 1498 mm (59,0 in)
- Seat height: 890 mm (35.0 in)
- Weight: 176 kg (388 lb) (dry)
- Fuel capacity: 14.5 Litres

The Ducati Hypermotard 950 family is updated for the Model Year 2022 and sees the entry into the range of a new livery for the SP version. All models become compliant with Euro 5 anti-pollution regulations.

The Borgo Panigale fun-bike family consists of three models: Hypermotard 950, Hypermotard 950 RVE and Hypermotard 950 SP. Three different choices, which allow the rider both to have fun in curves and to easily tackle city traffic with all the safety offered by Ducati's sophisticated electronic equipment.

The design of the Hypermotard 950 is inspired by the look of motards and revolves around the twin under-seat exhaust and the reduced superstructures that leave the mechanical components visible, including the trellis rear frame that communicates lightness and essentiality. The ergonomics of the bike, also derived from the motard world, ensure a riding position with an upright torso and wide elbows which translates into a great vehicle control, while the flat seat guarantees the possibility of wide longitudinal movements.

The new livery of the SP version recalls the world of MotoGP in its choice of colours and that of ‘freestyle sports’ in its graphic lines, underlining the dynamic and fun character of the bike. The Hypermotard 950 SP represents the top of the range and is distinguished from the other two models by Öhlins suspension with increased travel, Marchesini forged wheels and standard Ducati Quick Shift (DQS) Up and Down EVO.

The engine of the Hypermotard 950 family is the 937 cc Ducati Testastretta 11° twin-cylinder unit, capable of delivering 114 hp at 9,000 rpm and generating flat-cornered torque whose peak is 9.8 kgm at 7,250 rpm. These power and torque values remain unchanged with the transition to Euro 5 homologation.

The gearbox has been revised to make it easier to engage neutral when the bike is stationary and to ensure maximum precision in gear selection, adopting the same technical solution of the Monster and the SuperSport 950. The system envisages that the gearshift drum rotates on bearings, ensuring a movement with reduced friction. In addition, the gear lever spring is more loaded to prevent the system from remaining idle in the intermediate positions, thus resulting more precise.

The Hypermotard 950 in Ducati Red colour scheme, the Hypermotard 950 RVE characterized by “Graffiti” livery and the Hypermotard 950 SP in the new “SP” colour will be available for purchase in all Ducati network dealers starting from June 2021. The motorcycles are also available in a depowered version for A2 license holders. In Italy, on all the Borgo Panigale 35 kW bikes, Ducati offers a discount of €1,000 on the list price to encourage the entry of young enthusiasts into the world of two wheels.

== Hypermotard 698 ==
For MY 2024 Ducati began offering the Hypermotard 698 Mono to compete for market share with the KTM 690 Supermoto. The motor design is basically one-half of the Panigale 1299cc v-twin. The actual displacement is 659cc and produces about 77 HP. Seat height is 35.6 in., wheelbase is 56.8 in, front and rear wheels are 17in. with travel of 8.5/9.4 inches respectively.
