= Supermoto =

Form of motorcycle racing

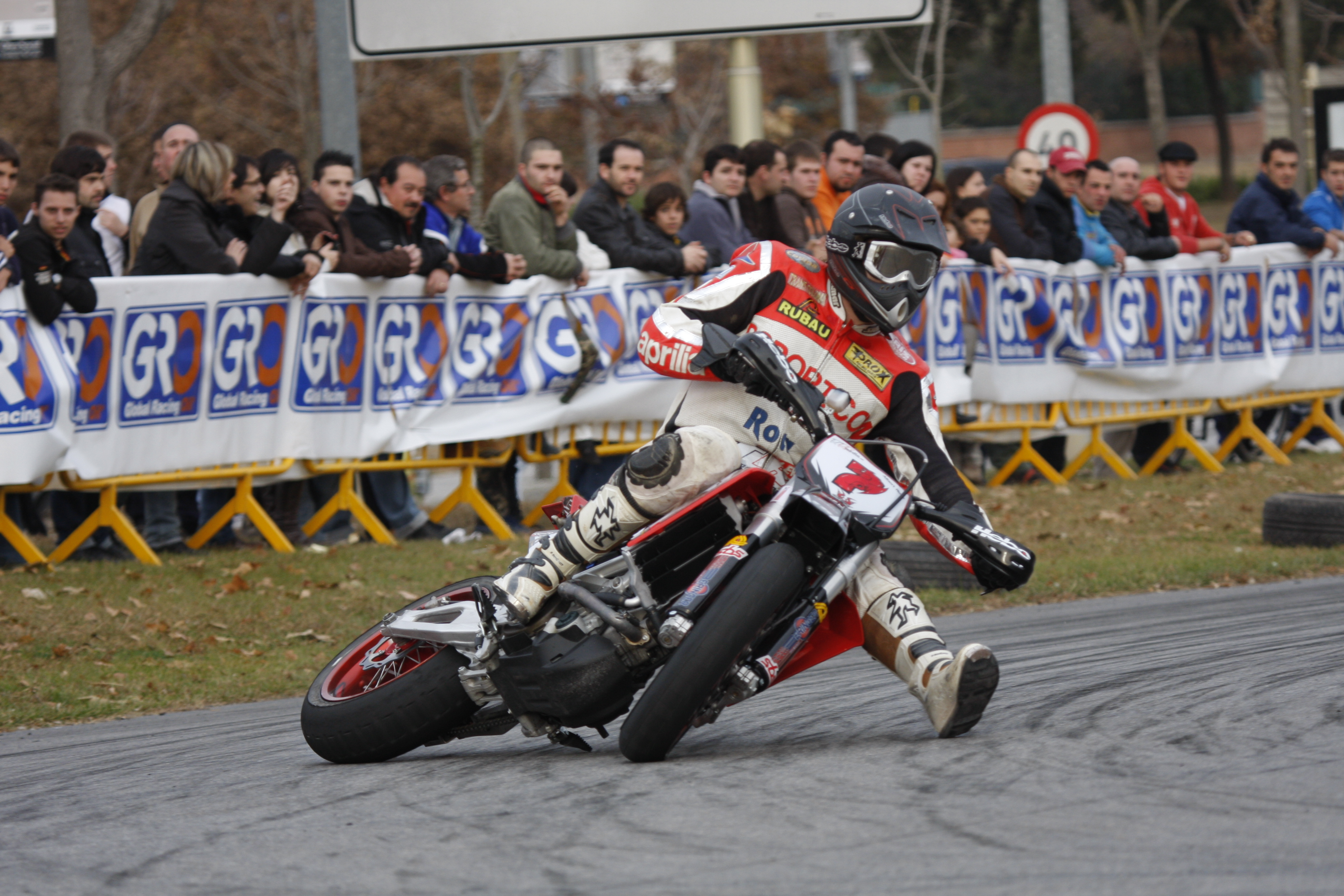
Cornering in a tarmac section

Through the dirt

Supermoto (also known as Supermotard or Motard) is a form of motorcycle racing held on race tracks that alternate between three kinds of track surfaces: the hard packed dirt of flat track, the irregular jumps and obstacles of motocross, and the paved tarmac of road racing.

== Overview ==
Supermoto was originally conceived by Gavin Trippe in 1979 as a segment of the TV show Wide World of Sports. It was something like an all-star game, in which the best riders from the three separate genres of motorcycle racing could temporarily leave their normal race class to come together and compete for the title of best all around racer. Today supermoto is a distinct genre of its own and riders in the other classes do not routinely cross over into supermoto.

Races are commonly held on road racing or medium-sized go-kart tracks with an off-road section in the infield. Most supermoto race tracks have a tarmac size of 50-75% and the remaining percentage of the course is off-road. The dirt sections are usually constructed of packed clay and feature motocross style obstacles like bermed corners and jumps. This type of racing is also very portable in that an entire track can be constructed anywhere there is a large area of open asphalt and an availability of dirt. Supermoto races have also been successfully held in busy urban centers using closed city streets for the road course and a vacant lot for the dirt sections.

The motorcycles used are frequently custom-created combinations of off-road motorcycles and road-racing wheels/tires, known as 'supermotard'. Riders also wear a combination of road race and offroad equipment, normally road racing leathers and motocross helmets and boots. Unlike normal motorcycle racing, the emphasis lies on slower speeds—typically less than 100 mph or 160 km/h— on short, technical tracks. Here, where flat-out acceleration and high top-speeds are less common, rider skill can more easily overcome a disparity in machine performance.

== History ==
Supermoto has its origins in the 1970s when ABC’s Wide World of Sports was the highest-rated sports show in the United States. In 1979, ABC commissioned a made-for-TV event called "Superbikers," created by motorcycling journalist and promoter Gavin Trippe, intended to find the ultimate all-around motorcycle racer by putting all star riders from different genres of racing on a single track that combined three genres of racing: flat track racing, motocross and road racing. Superbikers was then manifested as a yearly event run at southern California's Carlsbad Raceway. The show's tarmac-and-dirt courses were intended to draw on talent from the worlds of off-road, flat track and road racing. World and National Championship-winning motorcycling greats such as Kenny Roberts and Jeff Ward, whose respective sports at the time were road-racing and motocross, participated in the races. The Superbikers quickly became a huge Nielsen ratings contender, running until 1985, at which point ABC was forced to cancel the show due to new management and cuts; its cancellation also initiated a long sabbatical of the sport in the USA.

The European racers who participated in the sport at Carlsbad, however, brought it back to Europe with them, where it quickly gained popularity in countries such as France.

The 2000s signalled the resurrection of the sport in the United States, with the birth of the AMA Supermoto Championship in 2003 and with the event to the X Games in 2004. Both competitions were cancelled after the 2009 season.

The American Flat Track has integrated supermoto into the Super TT concept, first used in 2019 at the Daytona International Speedway with Supermoto-style tarmac and dirt course. The motorcycles will ride up the 18-degree tri-oval (tarmac) before going to the traditional TT-style racing on dirt with the esses and jump. The Arizona round at Wild Horse Pass Motorsports Park featured an all-dirt race similar with left and right turns along with jumps. In the 2020s, the Sturgis Motorcycle Rally round of American Flat Track became a true supermoto, with tarmac and dirt sections and road racing.

Ward raced, in his 50s, at both the Daytona and Arizona Super TT rounds.

The Supermoto World Championship was born in 2002 in a unique free displacement category. The first to win a world title is the French rider Thierry Van Den Bosch. Since 2006 there has been the mono-tyre, initially run by Dunlop, then Goldentyre in 2010 and Michelin in 2016. Since 2004 it has been divided into several classes, and since 2010 it has been raced in a single S1 class again.

== Machines ==
Prior to the 1990s, supermoto bikes, including the precursor motorcycles used in superbikes, were converted open-class two-stroke motocross or enduro bikes desired for their light weight and jumping abilities. The motorcycles currently used for supermoto racing are predominantly single-cylinder four-stroke and two-stroke-powered dirtbikes with 17-inch (430 mm), sometimes with 16.5-inch (420 mm) front wheels. The 17-inch (430 mm) wheels allow the use of up to 7.0-inch-wide (180 mm) superbike road racing slick tires. These are often hand-grooved on the rear tire to facilitate slightly better acceleration on the dirt stretches of a supermoto course. Suspension is lowered and slightly stiffened in comparison with a stock dirt bike, and braking power is improved with oversize front brake rotors and calipers. Despite the lack of trees on supermoto courses, hand guards are frequently added to supermoto bikes due to the extreme cornering angles achieved by riders. Hand guards also greatly improve survivability of the brake & clutch levers during a fall making supermoto bikes highly crash resistant and often able to quickly re-enter the fray during a race following a crash.

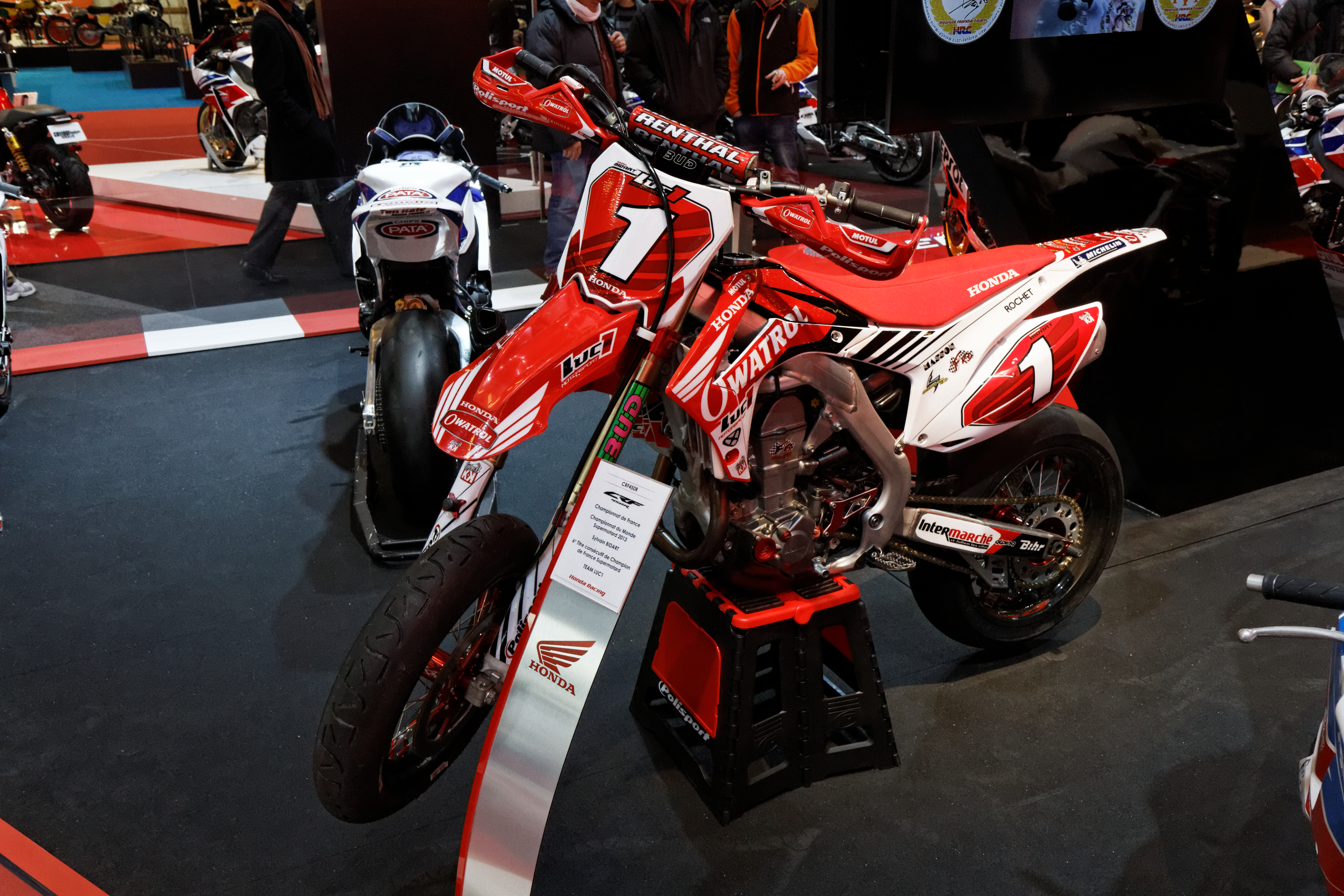
Honda CRF450R supermoto

In 1991, Italian manufacturer Gilera released the Nordwest model, the first factory-produced supermoto. Other European manufactures quickly followed suit, among them KTM, Husqvarna, Husaberg and CCM; all manufacturers whose emphasis were off-road models at the time. Models were developed for both track and road use. It took another ten years, until the mid-2000s for Japanese manufacturers, such as Yamaha (2004), Honda (2005) and Suzuki (2005) to start introducing supermoto models in the European market. The Italian factory TM Racing in Pesaro has started to produce a supermoto MX450F (2008) with the aluminum frame and racing character. Most of the supermoto bikes sold to the public are more domesticated models for road use rather than outright racing, for example the Suzuki DR-Z400SM.

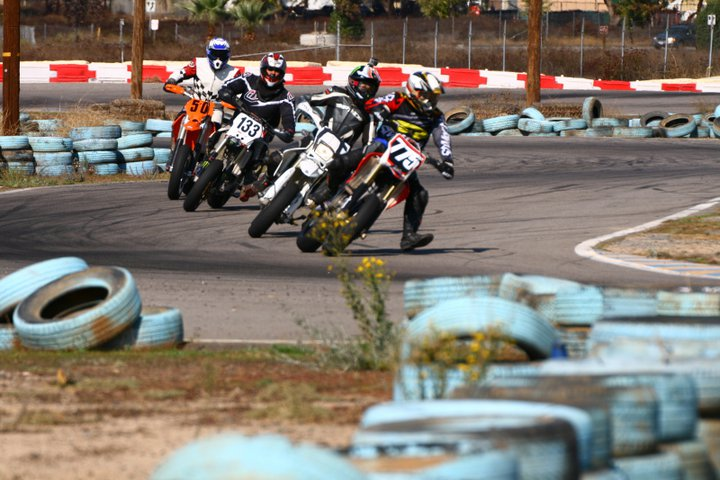
Apex Raceway supermoto

Due to the popularity, versatility, excitement and durability of these motorcycles, some owners modify them for street use. In order to do this, headlights, tail lights, horn, mirrors and street-legal tires among other occasional modifications are needed. Some state motor vehicle departments take a dim view of turning off-road bikes into street legal bikes, such as California, which requires an on-road emissions designation from the manufacturer. In countries like South Africa it is not possible to convert a dirt bike to road legal, as the bike is registered as a recreational vehicle. In Europe, most Supermotos are sold street legal from the factory and later tuned for race use. Supermoto type bikes, sometimes described as motards, make excellent city-goers as their upright seating position provides great visibility in traffic. Their narrow frames and light weight also make them incredibly maneuverable, as well as easier to ride on less than ideal road surfaces that force most sportbike riders to slow down.

=== Models ===
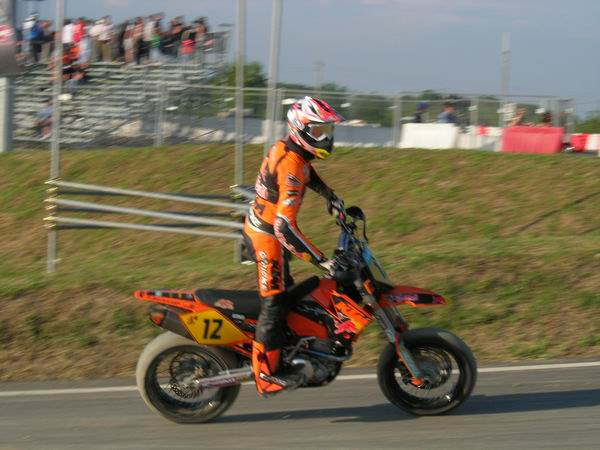
A KTM supermoto motorcycle

A number of manufacturers continue to tap into the popularity of supermoto bikes and currently produce models. Examples include: KTM 690 SMC R, KTM 450 SMR, Husqvarna FS 450, Husqvarna 701 Supermoto, Suzuki DR-Z400 SM, Yamaha WR250X, Honda CRF450R, Zero FXS, Aprilia SXV 550, Kawasaki KLX300 SM, and the TM Racing SMR 450.

== Gallery ==
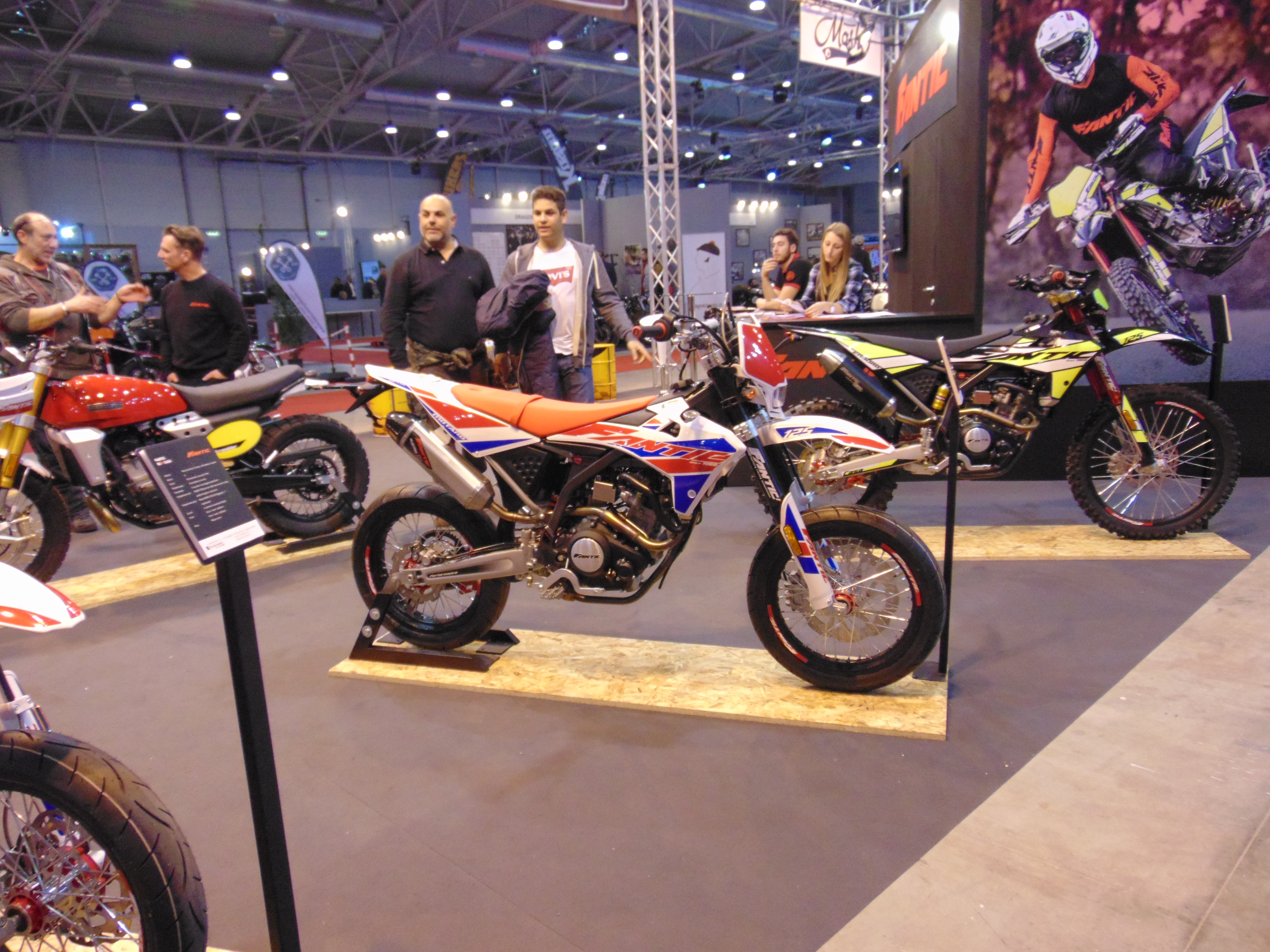
Fantic Motard 125

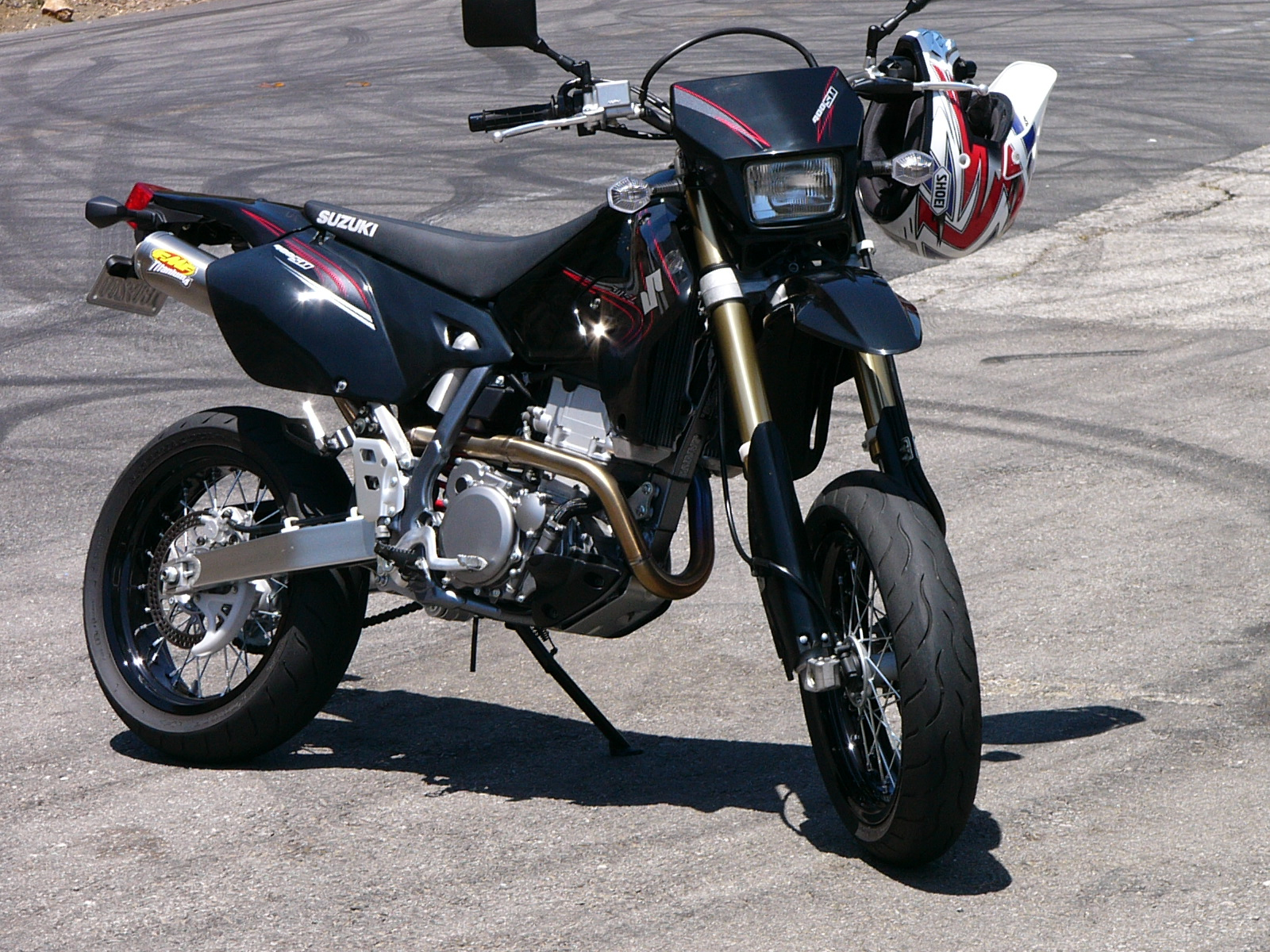
Suzuki DR-Z400 SM

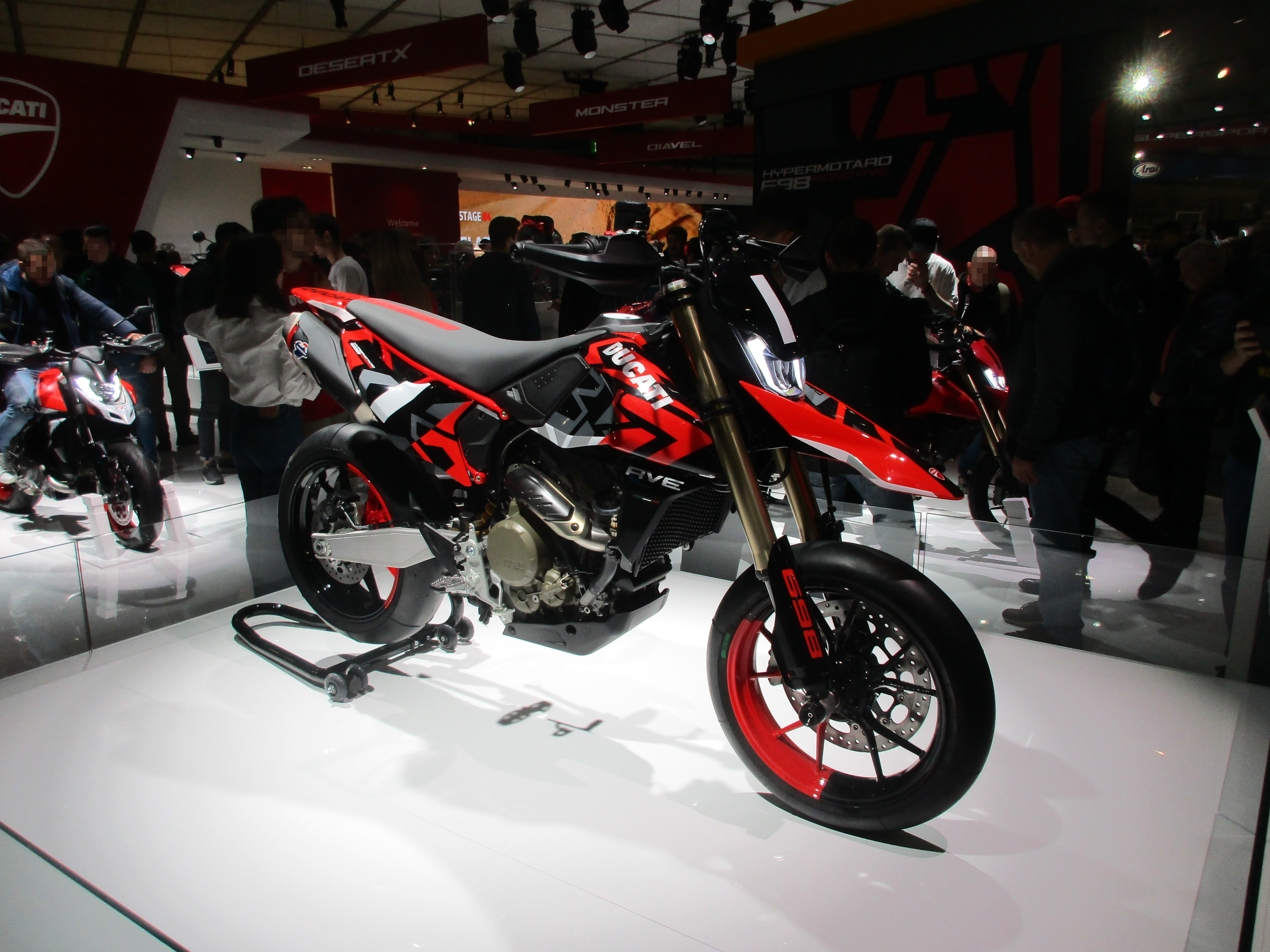
Ducati Hypermotard

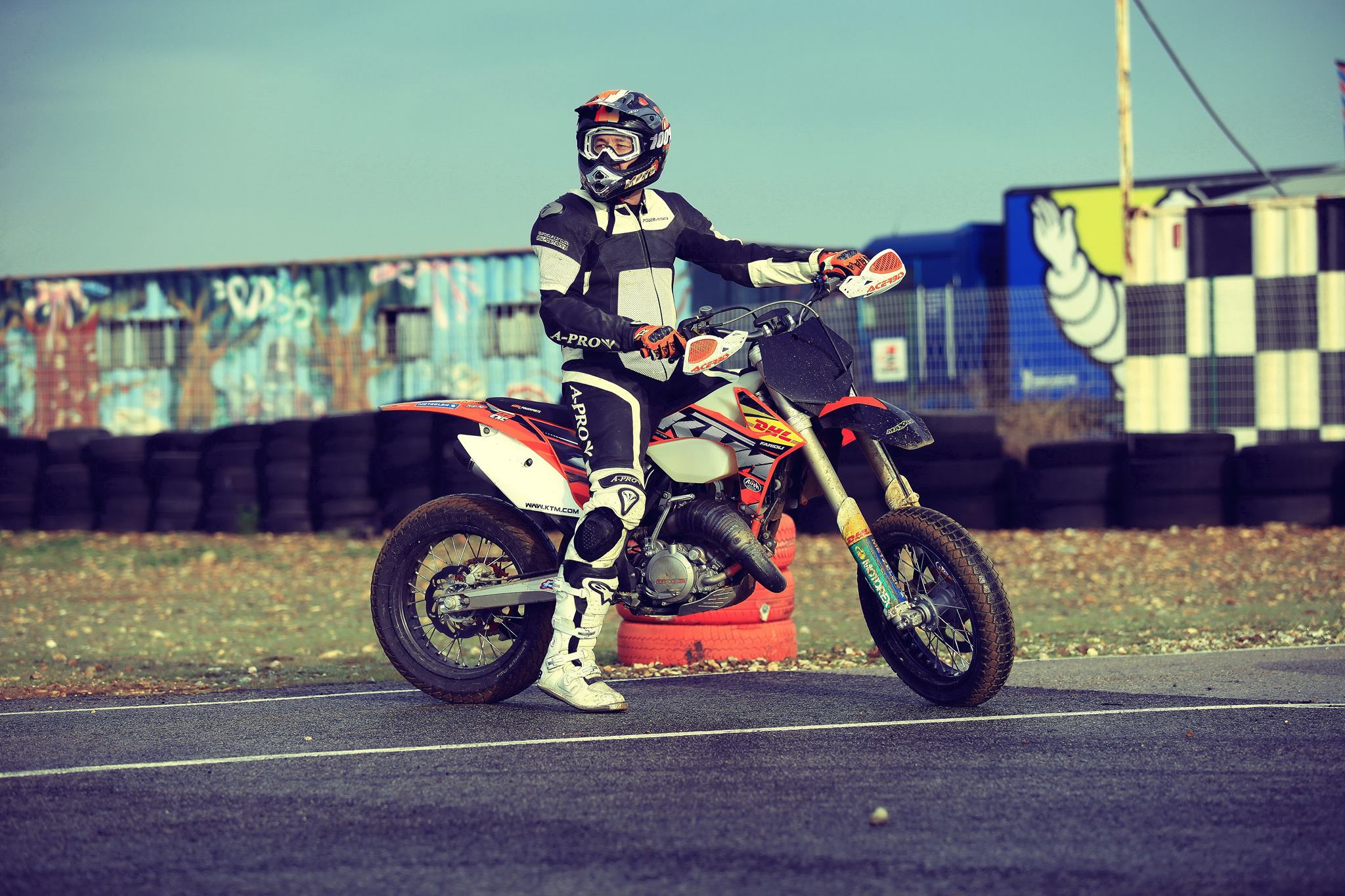
KTM Supermoto

== See also ==
- Outline of motorcycles and motorcycling
- Supermoto World Championship
- Supermoto European Championship
- Supermoto of Nations
- Rallycross
