= X-ring chain =

Sealed roller chain

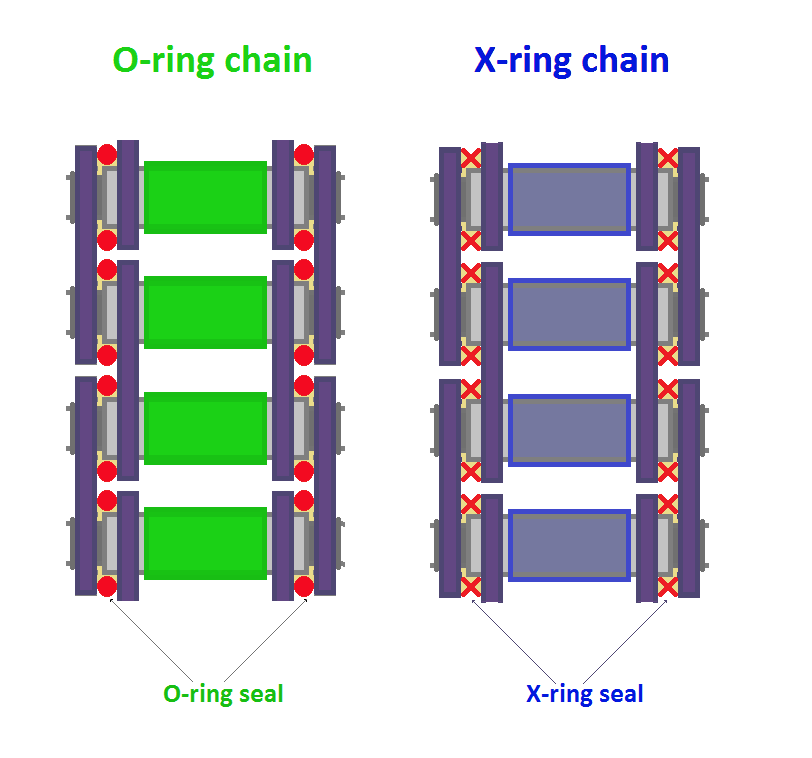
Difference between X-ring and regular O-ring chains. The seals are red in color.

The X-ring chain is a specialized type of sealed roller chain used to transfer mechanical power. Like the standard O-ring chains it is also used in high-performance motorcycles. It uses X-ring seal to keep lubricant (usually grease) in place.

It has higher performance (in terms of durability, lifetime, and power loss) than O-ring chains as it has less friction while providing adequate lubrication and protection against foreign elements which also increases reliability. It can last twice as long as the O-ring chain under some circumstances.

== Development ==
The X-ring chain is developed from O-ring chain which in turn is developed from non-O-ring chain. While the regular O-ring chain has high durability, it also has more friction (compared to other types of roller chains) due to distortion of the O-ring due to pressure from the inner and outer chain plates. This results in loss of power in the transmission. Therefore, X-ring chain was developed by replacing O-ring seal with X-ring seal which greatly reduced friction and increased durability.

== Design ==
Like the O-ring chain it has sealing rings which keep the contaminant (dirt) out, and lubricant in between the pins and bushings. This is known as internal lubrication. However, unlike O-ring chain, it has X-shaped seal which does not experience increased surface area (which is in contact with the chain plates) when under pressure. Therefore the friction in X-ring chain does not increase much when pressure is applied by the chain plates. Due to their unique shape, they have two additional sealing surfaces to a traditional O-ring.

Comparison between Standard roller chain, X-ring, and O-ring chain.
Chain type	Standard roller	O-ring chain	X-ring chain
Lubrication	Externally lubricated	Self lubricating (Internal)	Self lubricating (Internal)
Durability	Low	High	Very High
Efficiency	High	Relatively low	Very High
Maintenance	Frequent	Less frequent, special care	Least frequent, special care
Stretching	Regular	Limited	Limited
Cost	Relatively cheaper	Relatively expensive	Relatively expensive

== See also ==
- Motorcycle transmission
- O-ring chain
