= Metzeler =

German motorcycle tire company

Metzeler Reifen GmbH
- Type: Subsidiary
- Industry: motorsport
- Founded: Munich, Germany (1863; 163 years ago)
- Founder: Robert Friedrich Metzeler
- Defunct: 1975; 51 years ago
- Fate: Acquired by Pirelli
- Headquarters: Milan, Italy
- Area served: Worldwide
- Products: Motorcycle tyres
- Parent: Pirelli Tyre S.p.A.
- Website: http://www.metzeler.com

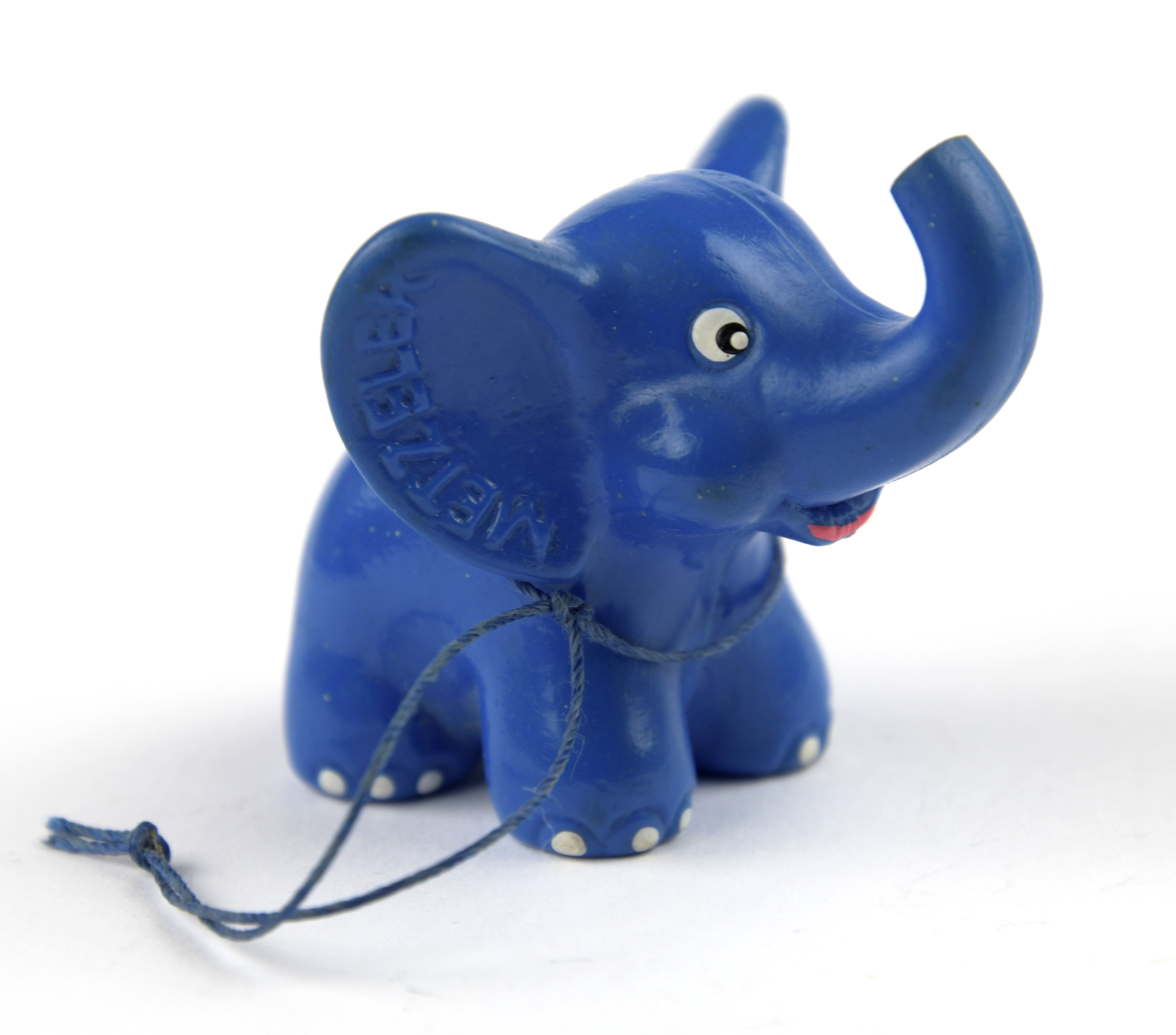
Metzeler elephant mascot of the 1990s

Metzeler is a German motorcycle tyre company founded in 1863. Metzeler originally produced a variety of rubber and plastic products, expanding into aviation in 1890 and automotive and motorcycle tyres in 1892. The factory was destroyed in World War II and rebuilt after the war. In the 1950s and 1960s the American distributor of Metzeler tyres was Berliner Motor Corporation. After 1979, Metzeler focused only on motorcycle tyres, and was acquired by Pirelli in 1986.
