= Husqvarna TR650 =

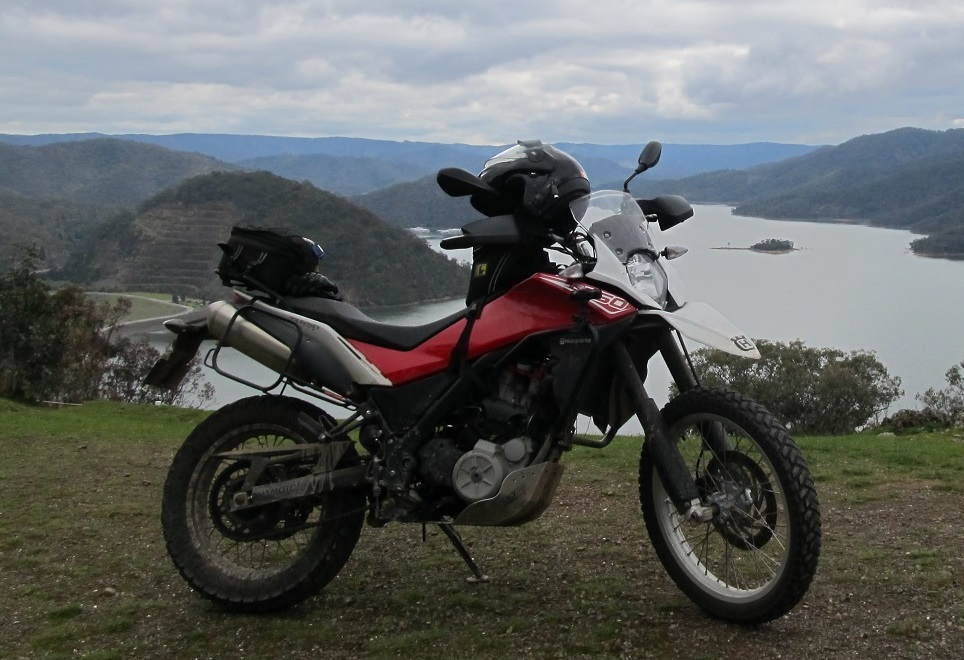
- Husqvarna TR650 Terra 2013
- Manufacturer: Husqvarna
- Also called: Terra / Strada
- Parent company: Pierer Industrie AG
- Production: 2012–2013 sold as 2013 & 2014 models
- Assembly: Cassinetta di Biandronno, Italy
- Successor: Husqvarna Norden 901
- Class: Dual-sport motorcycle
- Engine: 652 cc (39.8 cu in) DOHC 4-valve liquid-cooled single cylinder, with EFI
- Bore / stroke: 100.0 mm × 83.0 mm (3.94 in × 3.27 in)
- Compression ratio: 12.3:1
- Top speed: 170 km/h (110 mph)
- Power: 43 kW (58 hp) @ 7,250 rpm (Low power model 35 kW (47 hp) @ 7,250 rpm)
- Torque: 59.6 N⋅m (44.0 lbf⋅ft) @ 5,750 rpm (Low power model 54.2 N⋅m (40.0 lbf⋅ft) @ 5,750 rpm)
- Transmission: five-speed manual Final drive: #520 O ring sealed chain
- Frame type: Split backbone tubular steel frame
- Suspension: Front: Sachs upside down fork, Ø 46 mm Rear: steel swingarm with progressive link and Sachs shock absorber, spring preload mechanically adjustable, rebound damping adjustable, 190 mm (7.5 in) front/rear wheel travel
- Brakes: Front: Brembo hydraulically actuated single disc brake, Ø 300 mm, floating two caliper brake Rear: Brembo hydraulically actuated single disc brake, Ø 240 mm, floating single caliper brake
- Tyres: Terra Metzeler Sahara 3: front 90/90/21; rear 140/80/17; Strada Metzeler Tourance EXP: front 110/80/19; rear 140/80/17
- Wheelbase: 1,501 mm (59.1 in)
- Dimensions: L: 2,267 mm (89.3 in); W: 875 mm (34.4 in); H: 1,170 mm (46 in)
- Seat height: 860 mm (34 in)
- Weight: Terra 165 kg (364 lb); Terra ABS 166 kg (366 lb); Strada 168 kg (370 lb) (dry) Terra 183 kg (403 lb); Terra ABS 184 kg (406 lb); Strada 186 kg (410 lb) (wet)
- Fuel capacity: 14 L (3.1 imp gal; 3.7 US gal) (including the 2 L reserve) 95RON Fuel
- Oil capacity: 2,000 ml (70 imp fl oz; 68 US fl oz)

The Husqvarna TR650 is a dual sport motorcycle made by Husqvarna Motorcycles, a wholly owned subsidiary of KTM, which designs, engineers, manufactures and distributes motocross, enduro and supermoto motorcycles. The company began producing motorcycles in 1903 at Huskvarna, Sweden, as a subsidiary of the Husqvarna armament firm.

It is powered by a liquid-cooled single-cylinder 652 cc engine, two camshafts, and delivers 43 kW (58 hp) at 7,250 rpm and maximum torque of 59.6 N⋅m (44.0 lbf⋅ft) at 5,750 rpm. Countries with graduated rider licensing offer a reduced power version capable of 35 kW (47 hp) and 54 N⋅m (40 lbf⋅ft) of torque. At the time of the design and manufacture of the TR650, the Husqvarna motorcycle brand was owned by BMW Motorrad and this motorcycle shares many parts in common with other BMW models, including the G650GS, F650GS & F800GS. The engine is based on the BMW engine used in the F650GS/G650 models

The frame is a split-backbone tubular steel frame. Front forks are Sachs 46 mm upside-down telescopic forks while the rear is a dual swing arm made of pentagonal steel tubing with a single rear shock and progressive linkage, also supplied by Sachs.

The compression ratio is 12.3:1.

The TR650 was introduced in the 2013 model year and continues in 2014 as the same model.

== Models ==
The TR650 comes in two models:

- The Strada in black or red, has ABS standard, and runs on cast rims, 19" front and 17" rear.
- The Terra is red, and runs on spoked rims, front 21", rear 18" without ABS. In Europe the Terra is available with a 17" spoked rear wheel and ABS.
