= Husqvarna Motorcycles =

Swedish motorcycle manufacturer

Husqvarna Motorcycles GmbH
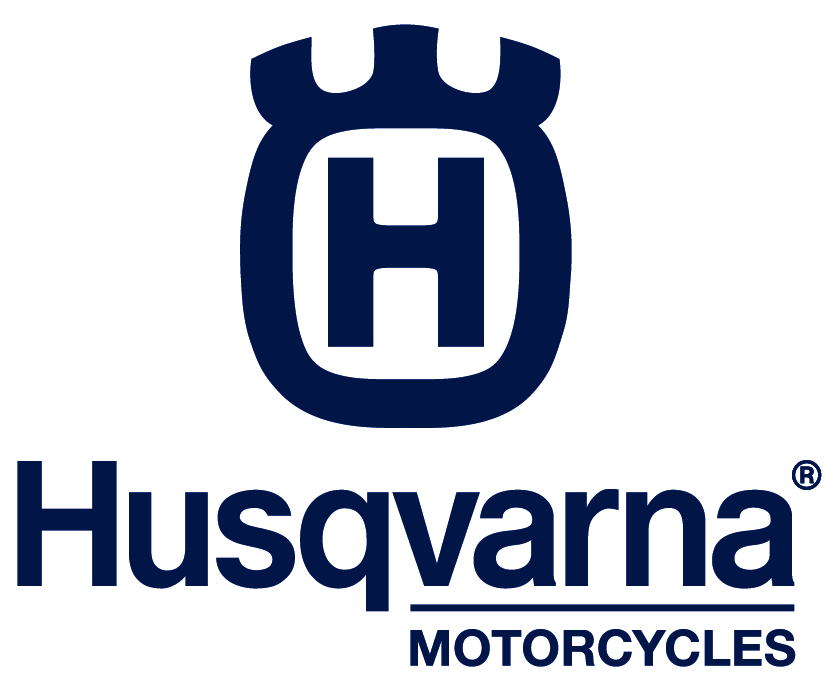
- Husqvarna logo
- Type: Private
- Industry: Manufacturing; Distribution
- Founded: 1903; 123 years ago, in Huskvarna, Sweden
- Headquarters: Mattighofen, Upper Austria, Austria
- Area served: Worldwide
- Key people: Stefan Pierer, Oliver Göhring, Reinhold Zens
- Owner: Bajaj Auto
- Website: husqvarna-motorcycles.com

Husqvarna Motorcycles GmbH (Swedish: [ˈhʉ̂ːsˌkvɑːɲa]; marketed as Husqvarna) is an Austrian motorcycle company with Swedish origins. It is owned by an Indian Motorcycle manufacturer Bajaj Auto through KTM AG.

The company began producing motorcycles in 1903 at Huskvarna, Sweden, as a subsidiary of the Husqvarna armament firm.

== History ==
=== Prior to 1987 ===
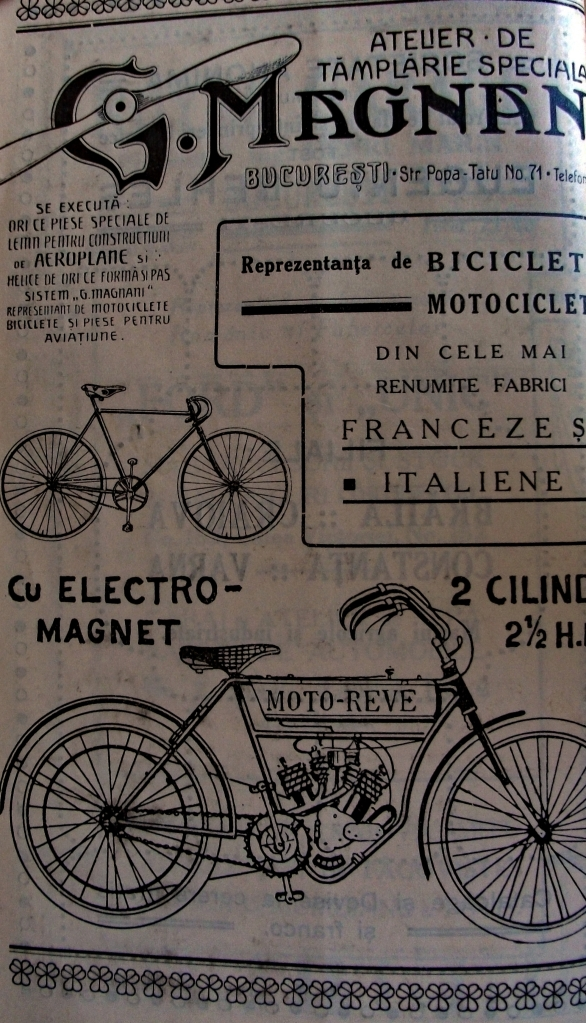
1912 Moto-Reve advertisement of G. Magnani in Bucharest

Husqvarna was founded near the town of Huskvarna in Sweden in 1689. The company started out as a maker of muskets, and the Husqvarna logo still depicts a gun sight viewed from the end of the barrel.

As with many motorcycle manufacturers, Husqvarna first began producing bicycles in the late 19th century. In 1903, they made the jump to motorcycle manufacturing. The first "Husky" motorcycles used imported engines, and it was not until 1916 that Husqvarna began producing machines built entirely in-house. Around that time they secured a contract with the Swedish Army, and also began entering cross-country and long-distance motorcycle races. In 1916, Husqvarna established its own engine factory and the first engine to be designed was a 550 cc four-stroke 50-degree side-valve V-twin engine, similar to those made by companies like Harley-Davidson and Indian.

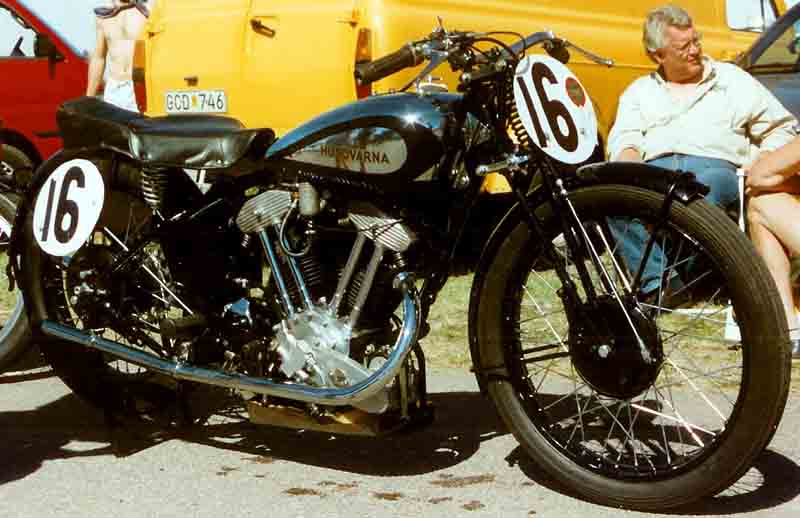
1931 Husqvarna TV Racer 500

Husqvarna competed in Grand Prix road racing in the 350cc and 500cc classes during the 1930s and was Sweden's largest motorcycle manufacturer by 1939. All of the racing bikes were based on a 50-degree V-twin prototype built by Folke Mannerstedt in 1931. The company team beat the Norton works team at the Swedish Grand Prix in 1932 with a 1–2 finish by Ragnar Sundqvist and Gunnar Kalén. This and the next year's success led to a full commitment to the Grand Prix tracks with Stanley Woods and Ernie Nott joining the Husqvarna riding team. That year, Nott finished third in the 350cc Junior TT and Woods ran out of gas eight miles before the finish of the Senior TT.

In 1935, the company withdrew racing support, but new bikes were still produced and raced privately, while the company focused on producing a new two-stroke, two-speed commuter bike. That year, Woods won the Swedish Grand Prix (marking the fourth year in a row that a "Husky" had won) on a 500cc Husqvarna motorcycle that weighed 279 pounds (127 kilograms).

With the rise of motocross as a sport Husqvarna focused on producing light weight racing bikes. They adapted their lightweight single cylinder bike to racing and delivered the Silverpilen, meaning 'the silver arrow' in Swedish. At 75 kg and designed for racing it gained widespread popularity. Sporting many innovations like telescoping front forks and hydraulic damped suspension it became an international success.

The 1959 motocross championship went to Rolf Tibblin and his 250 cc Husqvarna. The 1960 world 500 cc motocross championship was won by Bill Nilsson on a four-stroke Husqvarna. In the 1960s, their lightweight, two-stroke-engined off-road bikes helped make the once-dominant British four-stroke motorcycles obsolete. Throughout the 1960s and 1970s, Husqvarna was a dominant force in the motocross world, winning 14 motocross world championships in the 125 cc, 250 cc and 500 cc divisions, 24 enduro world championships and 11 Baja 1000 victories.

1983 saw Husqvarna innovate again with the introduction of a 500 cc bike that set new standards for competition four-strokes. It was lightweight, air-cooled, easy-handling and changed the future of off-road racing motorcycles. It was the predecessor of the Husaberg brand.

Historical models produced by Husqvarna
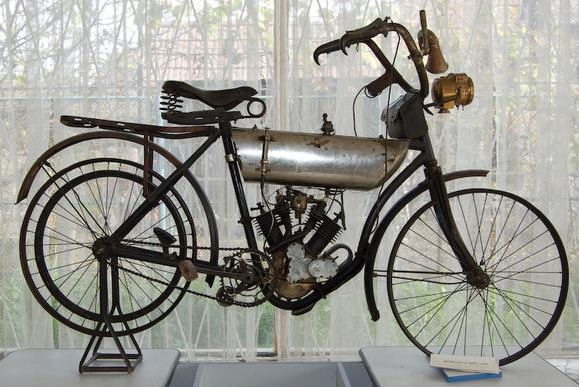
Moto-Reve model 1910 that belonged to Romanian aviation pioneer Aurel Vlaicu

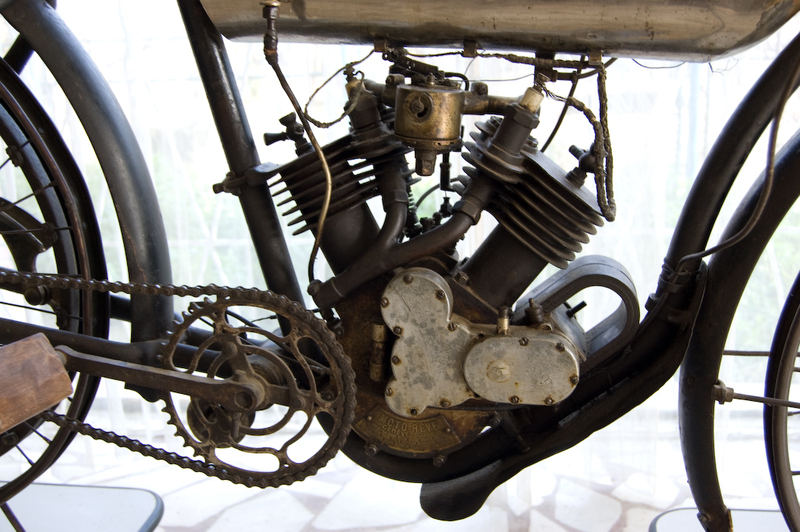
Engine detail Moto-Reve model 1910

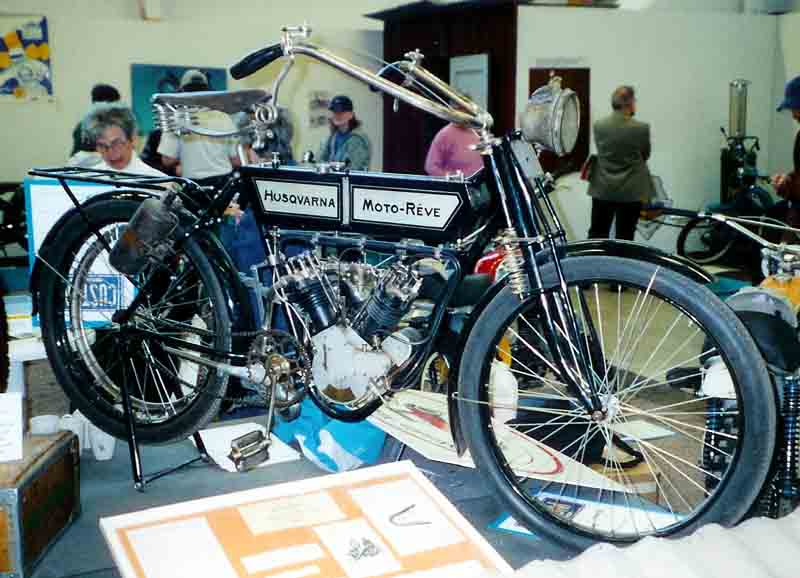
Husqvarna Moto-Reve

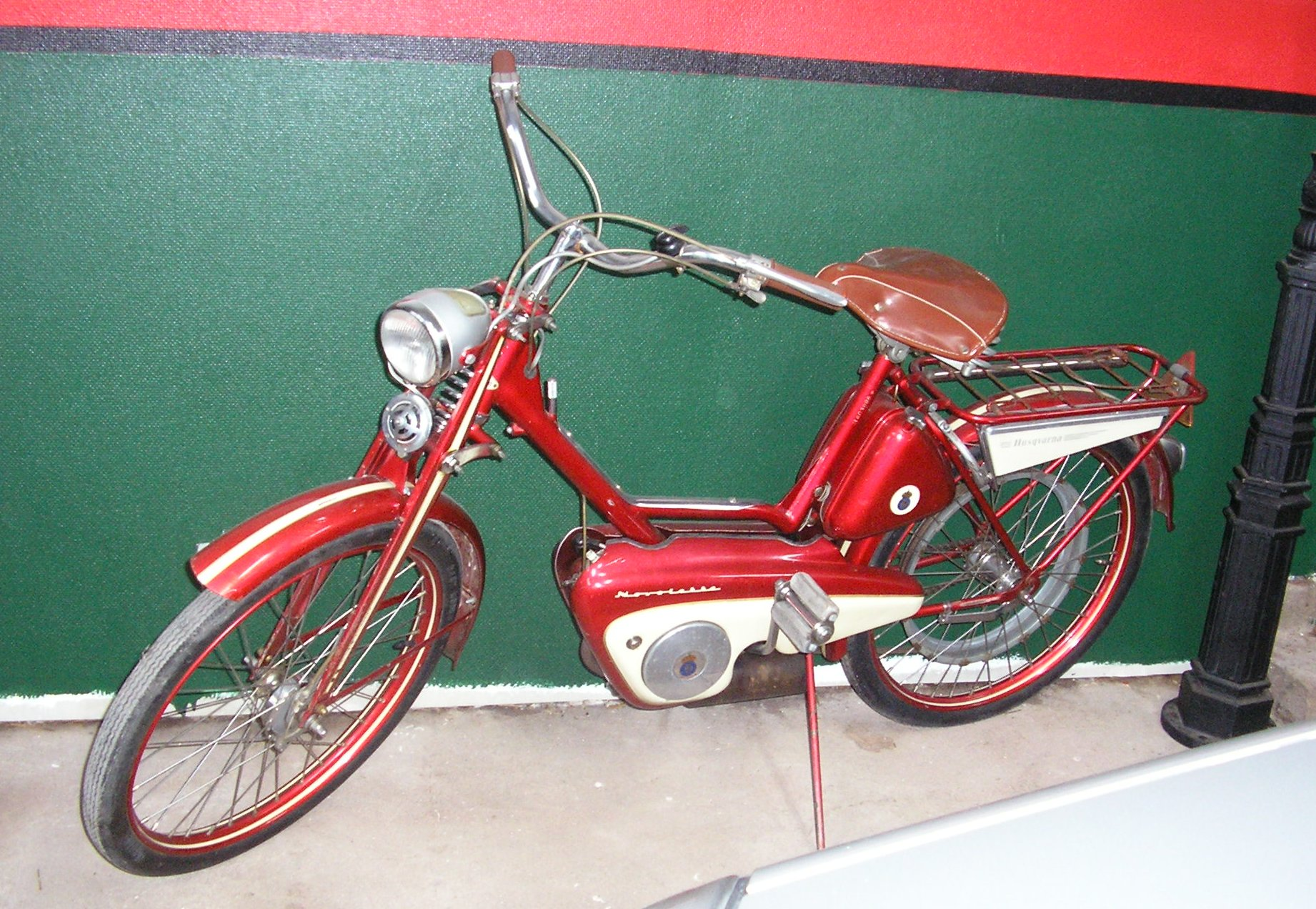
Husqvarna Novolette moped

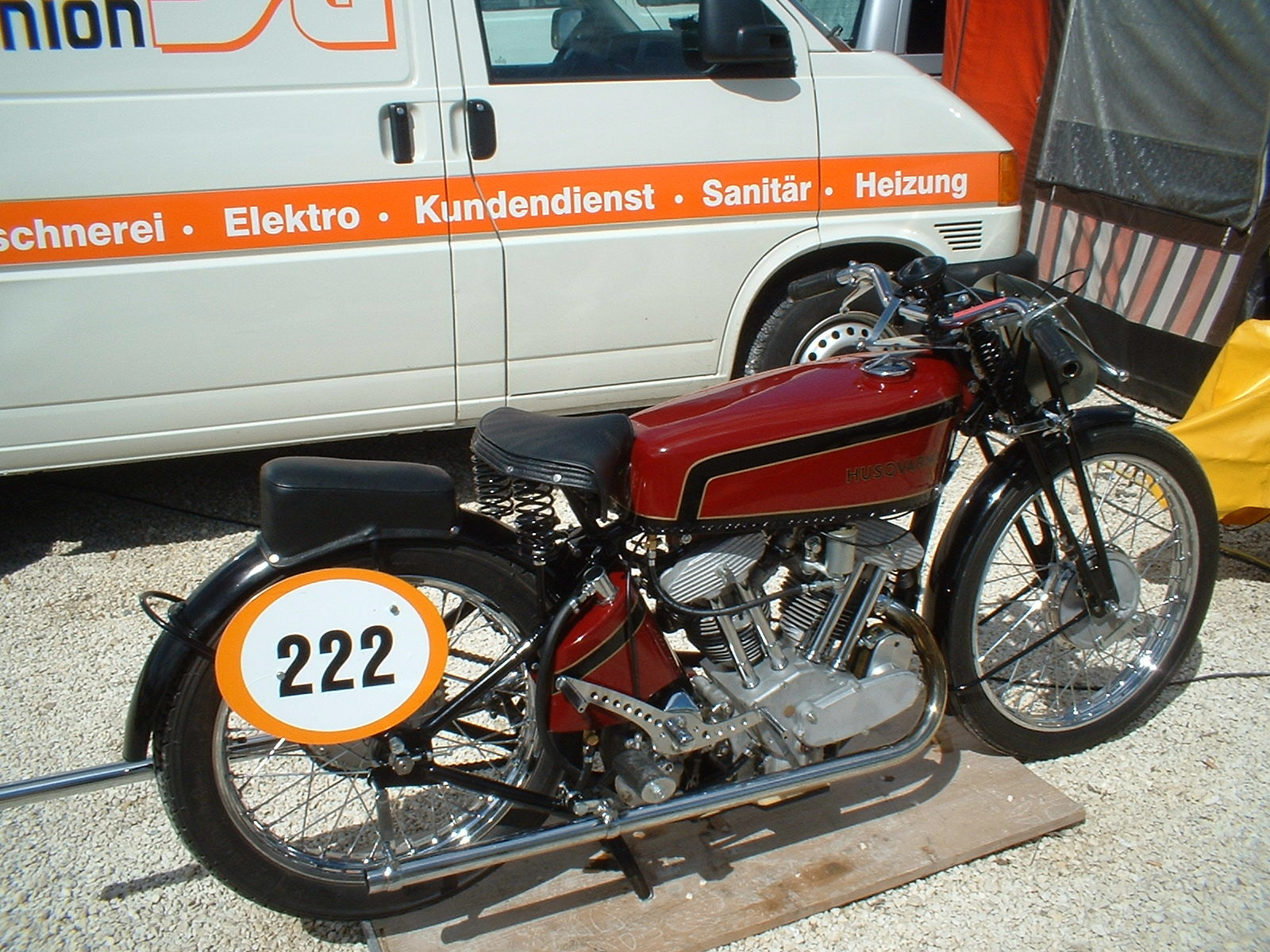
Husqvarna Racebike 2003

=== Ownership changes and acquisition by KTM ===
In 1987, the Husqvarna motorcycle division (not the other arms of the brand such as chainsaw production) was sold to Italian motorcycle manufacturer Cagiva, and years later became part of MV Agusta. A group of the company's managers and engineers were not willing to move to Italy and therefore founded Husaberg – which was acquired by KTM in 1995. Husqvarna motorcycles were then produced in Varese, Italy.

In July 2007, Husqvarna motorcycles was purchased by BMW Motorrad for a reported €93 million. BMW planned to continue operating Husqvarna Motorcycles as a separate enterprise. All development, sales and production activities, as well as the workforce, remained at the Varese location. BMW intended to position Husqvarna as "the two-wheeled version of what Mini is to the BMW's car division".

On 31 January 2013 BMW announced that Pierer Industrie has bought full stake in Husqvarna for an undisclosed amount. Pierer Industrie CEO, Stefan Pierer was also the CEO of Cross Industries, then the main shareholder of KTM-Sportmotorcycle parent KTM, and the CEO of KTM. Later in 2013, direct ownership of the Husqvarna company was transferred and license rights were sold from Pierer Industrie to KTM, making the newly established Husqvarna Motorcycle GmbH part of the KTM Group. Husqvarna motorcycle production at Mattighofen in Austria started on 7 October 2013. At the same time, Husqvarna spin-off Husaberg was re-united with Husqvarna, terminating the existence of the Husaberg brand.

=== After acquisition ===
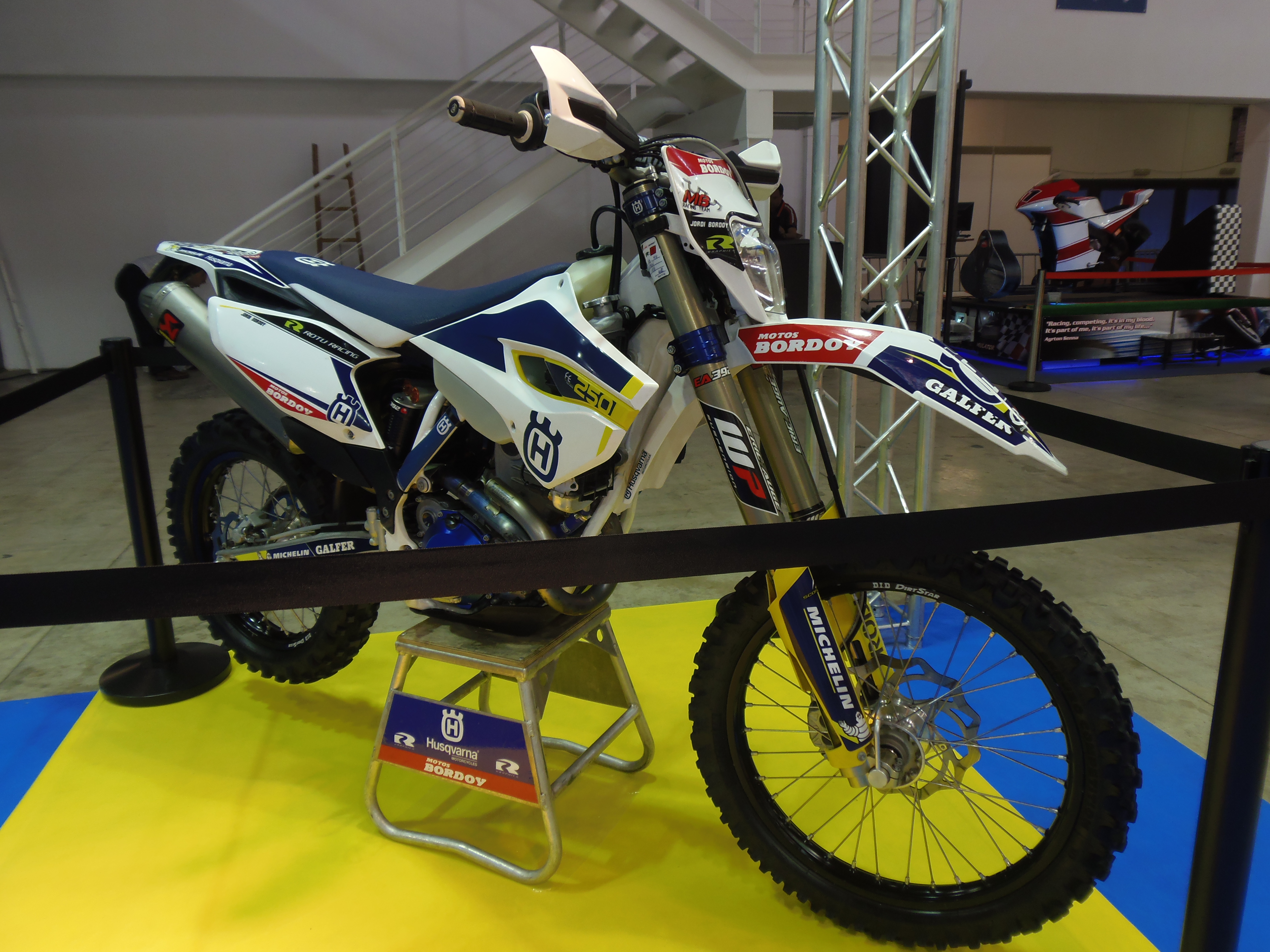
Husqvarna FE 250

After acquisition by KTM, Husqvarna Motorcycles prepared its re-entry into the street motorcycle market. In 2014, the company presented prototypes of the newly developed 401 Vitpilen and 401 Svartpilen at the EICMA in Milan, Italy. Production ready versions were shown in 2016. Together with the 701 Vitpilen, which was first revealed in 2015, these motorcycles became publicly available in 2018.

In 2017, Husqvarna Motorcycles introduced a new range of enduro motorcycles with a self-developed two-stroke fuel injection system (Transfer Port Injection - TPI). The new fuel efficient, sensor-controlled technology conforms with the Euro 4 regulations for emission management.

Since 2025, Husqvarna has been wholly-owned by Bajaj Group.

=== Timeline of ownership ===
- 1903 – Subsidiary of Husqvarna Armament
- 1978 – Electrolux acquired Husqvarna.
- 1987 – Motorcycle division sold to Cagiva
- 1988 – Husaberg Motor AB brand spinoff
- 2007 – Husqvarna motorcycles purchased by BMW
- 2013 – Husqvarna AG purchased by Pierer Industrie
- 2013 – Transfer to KTM AG, establishing Husqvarna Motorcycle GmbH and reuniting with Husaberg
- 2025 – Bajaj Auto acquired Husqvarna.

== Current models ==
Husqvarna bikes list
Category	Model	Engine Type	Engine Designation	Picture
Motocross	TC	2-Stroke	50cc; 65cc; 85cc; 125cc; 250cc	FC 450
Motocross	FC	4-Stroke	250cc; 350cc; 450cc	FC 450
Motocross	EE 5	Electric	50cc	FC 450
Enduro	TE	2-Stroke	150cc; 250cc; 300cc	FE 450
Enduro	FE	4-Stroke	250cc; 350cc; 450cc; 501cc	FE 450
Dual Sport	Enduro	4-Stroke	701cc	701 Enduro
Dual Sport	Norden	4-stroke	901cc	701 Enduro
Dual Sport	Norden Expedition	4-stroke	901cc	701 Enduro
Supermoto	FS	4-Stroke	450cc	701 Supermoto
Supermoto	Supermoto	4-Stroke	701cc	701 Supermoto
Naked	Vitpilen	4-Stroke	250cc (Note: for the Indian market); 401cc; 701cc; 801cc	Vitpilen 701
Naked	Svartpilen	4-Stroke	125cc; 401cc; 801cc	Vitpilen 701

=== Model naming conventions ===
Husqvarna names many of their motorcycles according to a nomenclature of engine cycle ("F" for Four-stroke, "T" for Two-stroke), application or type ("C" for motoCross machines, "E" for Enduro motorcycles, "X" for Xcountry machines, "S" for Supermotos), and engine displacement. Some models of two-stroke machines formally had the suffix "i" included to indicate that these models have transfer port injection, rather than carburetors, but Husqvarna has since changed nearly all large-displacement two-stroke models to fuel injection. For example:

- FS 450 - a four-stroke supermoto with 450 cc engine displacement
- TE 300i - a two-stroke enduro motorcycle with 300 cc engine displacement and transfer port injection
- TC 125 - a two-stroke motocross machine with 125 cc engine displacement and carburetor

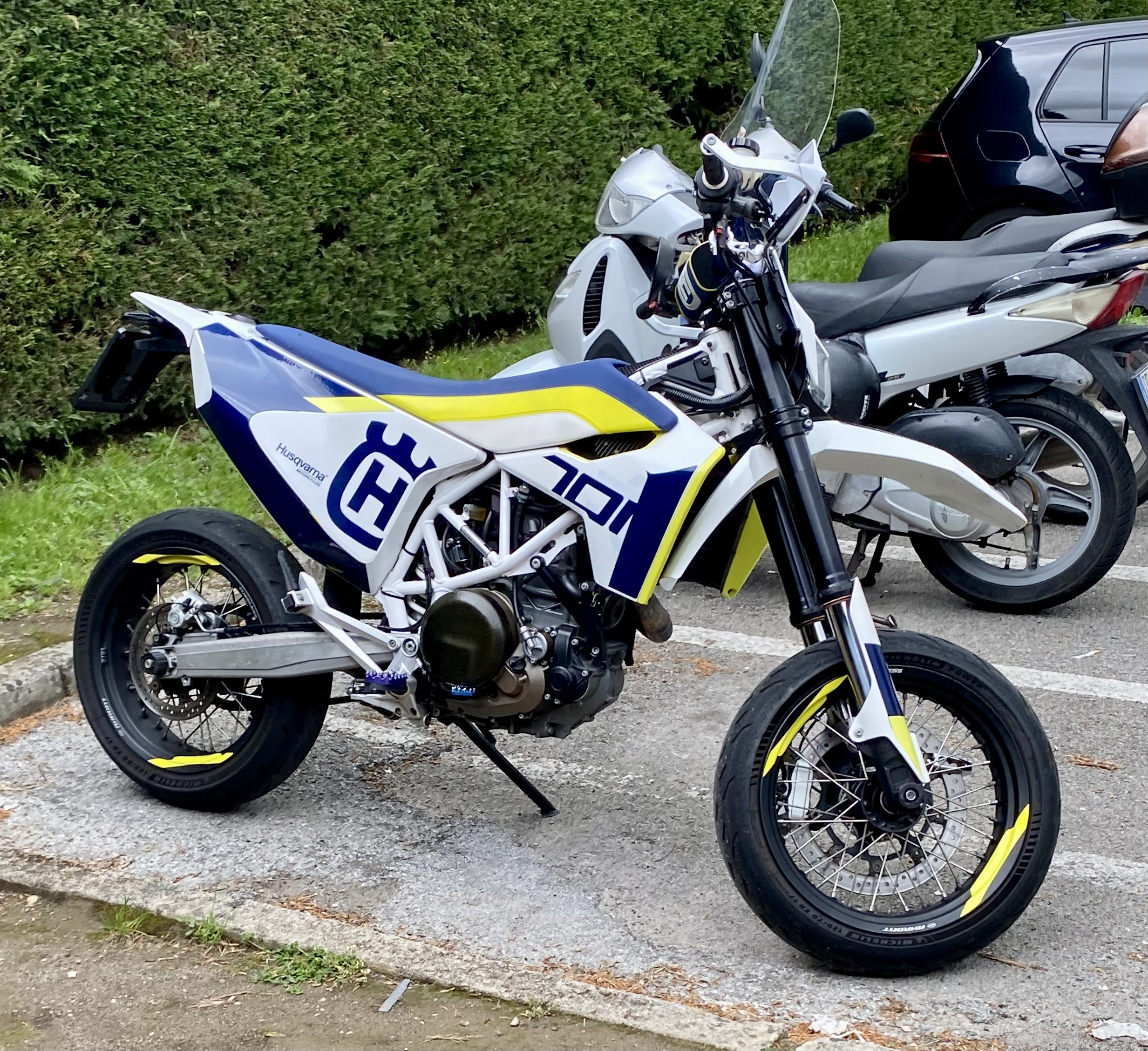
Husqvarna 701 Supermoto

Some newer models (particularly of larger displacement) include a numbered designation of _01. These designations are not direct references to the engine displacement, but approximate values. For example:

- 401 designates a 373 cc engine, derived from the KTM 390 series of street bikes
- 501 designates a 510 cc engine, derived from the KTM 500 series of enduro bikes
- 701 designates a 690 cc engine, derived from the KTM 690 series of enduro, supermoto, and street bikes

Husqvarna also use the names "Vitpilen" and "Svartpilen" for their range of naked street bikes, which are Swedish for "the white arrow" and "the black arrow", respectively.

== Racing ==
Husqvarna has been a regular and successful presence at international off-road racing events since the 1930s. By 2008, riders on Husqvarna machines had secured more than 70 Motocross, Enduro and Supermoto world titles as well as numerous victories at important rally races like the Baja 1000.

Since 2015, the energy drink manufacturer Rockstar is the title sponsor of Husqvarna's off-road factory team. The Rockstar Energy Husqvarna Factory Racing Team competes in all off-road classes, participating in every event of the AMA Supercross and Motocross series. So far, it has scored titles in the 2016 FIM Cross-Country Rallies World Championship, the 2015/2016 FIM SuperEnduro World Championship, the 2016 AMA EnduroCross Championship, and the 2023 World Rally-Raid Championship.

=== Championships ===
==== Motocross ====
- 1959 – Rolf Tibblin, European Motocross Champion, 250 cc class.
- 1960 – Bill Nilsson, Motocross World Champion, 500 cc class.
- 1962 – Rolf Tibblin, Motocross World Champion, 500 cc class.
- 1962 – Torsten Hallman, Motocross World Champion, 250 cc class.
- 1963 – Rolf Tibblin, Motocross World Champion, 500 cc class.
- 1963 – Torsten Hallman, Motocross World Champion, 250 cc class.
- 1966 – Torsten Hallman, Motocross World Champion, 250 cc class.
- 1967 – Torsten Hallman, Motocross World Champion, 250 cc class.
- 1969 – Bengt Åberg, Motocross World Champion, 500 cc class.
- 1970 – Bengt Åberg, Motocross World Champion, 500 cc class.
- 1974 – Heikki Mikkola, Motocross World Champion, 500 cc class.
- 1976 – Heikki Mikkola, Motocross World Champion, 250 cc class.
- 1976 - Kent Howerton, Motocross United States Champion, 500 cc class.
- 1979 – Håkan Carlqvist, Motocross World Champion, 250 cc class.
- 1993 – Jacky Martens, Motocross World Champion, 500 cc class.
- 1998 – Alessio Chiodi, Motocross World Champion, 125 cc class
- 1999 – Alessio Chiodi, Motocross World Champion, 125 cc class
- 2014 – Ben Adriaenssen & Ben van den Bogaart, Sidecarcross World Championship
- 2014 – Tony Saunders, UK GT Cup, Youth Lites Class.
- 2014 – Nathan Watson, UK Mx National, MX1 Class.
- 2016 – Jan Hendrickx & Ben van den Bogaart, Sidecarcross World Championship
- 2017 – Zach Osborne, Lucas Oil AMA Pro Motocross Championship, 250 cc class.
- 2020 - Zach Osborne, Lucas Oil AMA Pro Motocross Champion 450cc class.

==== Supercross ====
- 2015 – Kyle Regal, AMSOIL AMA Arenacross Championship, Arenacross class.
- 2017 – Zach Osborne, Monster Energy AMA Supercross Championship, East Coast 250 cc class.
- 2018 – Jason Anderson, Monster Energy AMA Supercross Championship, 450 cc class.
- 2018 – Zach Osborne, Monster Energy AMA Supercross Championship, East Coast 250 cc class.

==== Baja 1000 ====
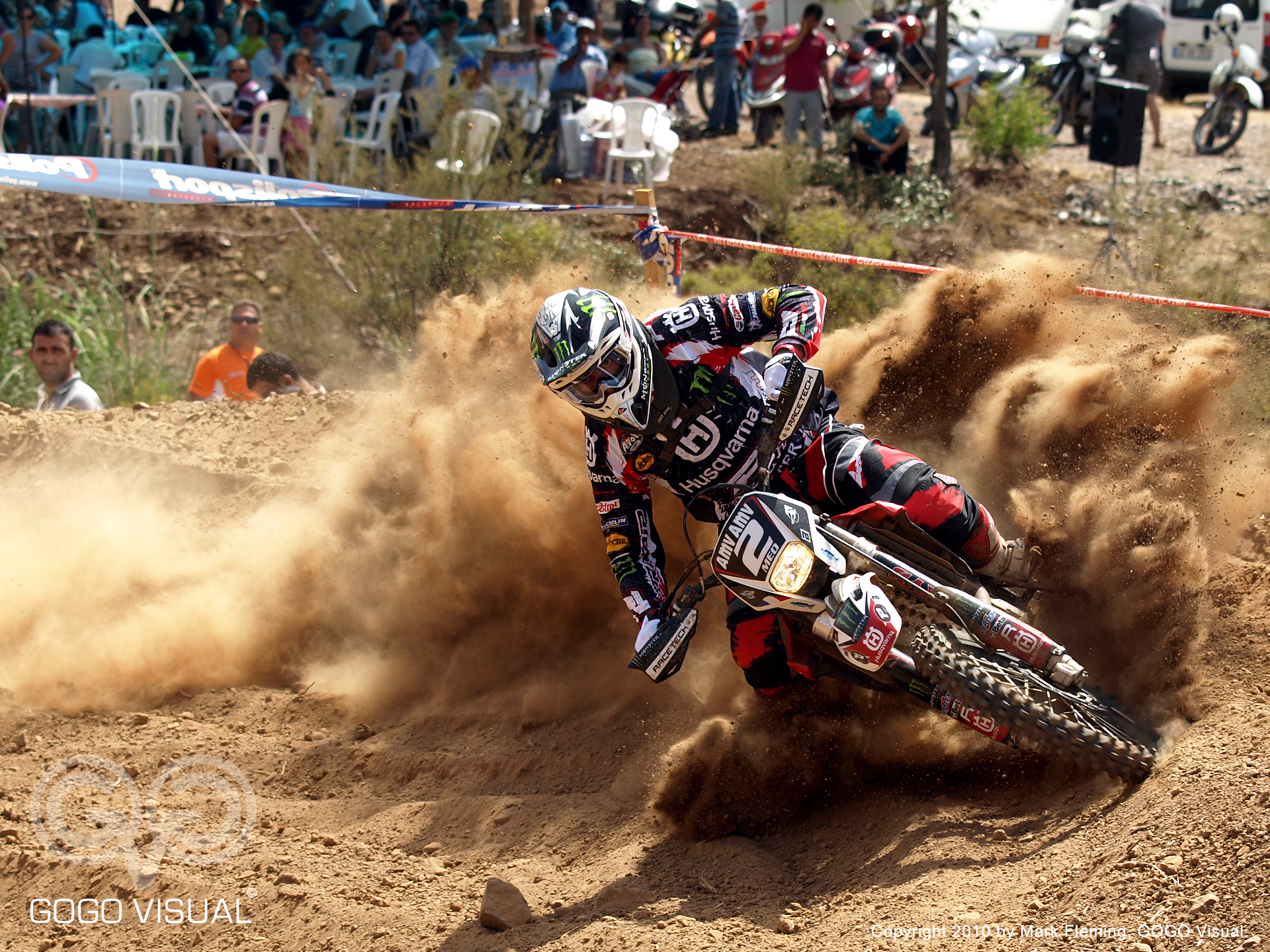
Antoine Méo at the 2010 GP of Turkey

- 1967 – J.N. Roberts, Malcolm Smith
- 1969 – Gunnar Nilsson, J.N. Roberts
- 1971 – Malcolm Smith, Gunnar Nilsson
- 1972 – Gunnar Nilsson, Rolf Tibblin
- 1973 – Mitch Mayes, A.C. Bakken
- 1976 – Larry Roeseler, Mitch Mayes
- 1977 – Brent Wallingsford, Scot Harden
- 1978 – Larry Roeseler, Jack Johnson
- 1979 – Larry Roeseler, Jack Johnson
- 1981 – Scot Harden, Brent Wallingsford
- 1983 – Dan Smith, Dan Ashcraft

==== Enduro ====
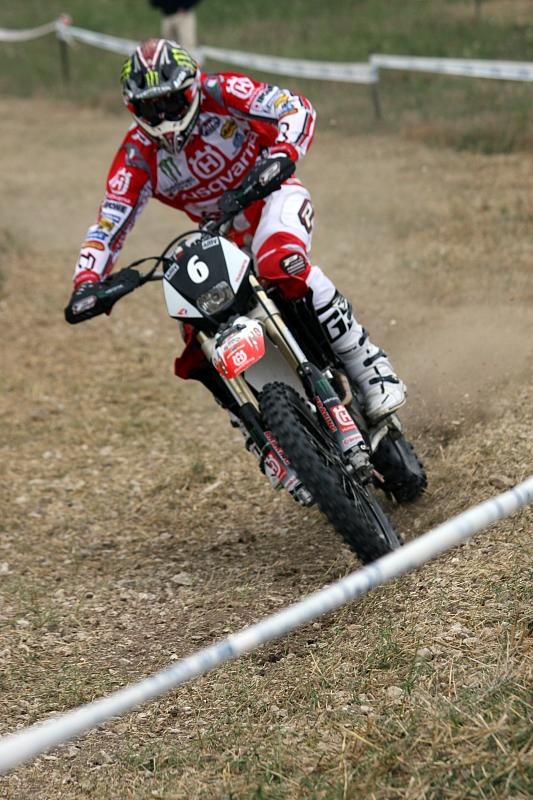
Bartosz Obłucki at the 2008 GP of Italy

- 1990 – 350 cc World Enduro Championship
- 1991 – 250 cc World Enduro Championship
- 1992 – 350 cc World Enduro Championship
- 1993 – 125 cc World Enduro Championship
- 1993 – 350 cc World Enduro Championship
- 1994 – 125 cc World Enduro Championship
- 1994 – 500 cc World Enduro Championship
- 1995 – 125 cc World Enduro Championship
- 1995 – 500 cc World Enduro Championship
- 1996 – 350 cc World Enduro Championship
- 1998 – 500 cc World Enduro Championship
- 1999 – 500 cc World Enduro Championship
- 2000 – 250 cc World Enduro Championship
- 2001 – 125 cc World Enduro Championship
- 2001 – 400 cc World Enduro Championship
- 2001 – 500 cc World Enduro Championship
- 2002 – 125 cc World Enduro Championship
- 2002 – 250 cc World Enduro Championship
- 2002 – 500 cc World Enduro Championship
- 2003 – 400 cc World Enduro Championship
- 2010 – E1 World Enduro Championship with Antoine Méo
- 2011 – E1 World Enduro Championship with Juha Salminen
- 2011 – E2 World Enduro Championship with Antoine Méo
- 2014 – E2 World Enduro Championship with Pela Renet
- 2015 – E3 World Enduro Championship with Mathias Bellino

==== SuperEnduro ====
- 2015/16 FIM SuperEnduro World Championship with Colton Haaker
- 2016/17 FIM SuperEnduro World Championship with Colton Haaker
- 2018/19 FIM SuperEnduro World Championship with Colton Haaker
- 2019/20 FIM SuperEnduro World Championship with Billy Bolt
- 2021/22 FIM SuperEnduro World Championship with Billy Bolt
- 2022/23 FIM SuperEnduro World Championship with Billy Bolt

==== Hard Enduro ====
- 2021 FIM Hard Enduro World Championship with Billy Bolt

==== Supermoto ====
- 2005 – Gérald Delepine, SM1 World Supermoto Championship
- 2007 – Adrien Chareyre, SM1 World Supermoto Championship
- 2007 – Gérald Delepine, SM2 World Supermoto Championship
- 2008 – Adrien Chareyre, SM2 World Supermoto Championship
- 2009 – Adrien Chareyre, SM2 World Supermoto Championship

=== Grand Prix ===
==== Moto2 ====
Starting from the 2023 season, Husqvarna is the sponsor working with the Intact GP team in the Moto2 world championship and uses the name Liqui Moly Husqvarna Intact GP.

==== Moto3 ====
After being acquired by KTM in 2013, Husqvarna entered the Moto3 World Championship in 2014 and 2015 as a unique constructor using their KTM-based FR250GP. The team re-entered Moto3 beginning with the 2020 season, and also used their FR250GP in the Moto3 Junior Championship, winning the 2016, 2019 and 2024 titles.

Year	Rider	QAT (Qatar)	AME (United States)	ARG (Argentina)	ESP (Spain)	FRA (France)	ITA (Italy)	CAT (Catalonia)	NED (Netherlands)	GER (Germany)	IND (United States)	CZE (Czech Republic)	GBR (United Kingdom)	RSM (San Marino)	ARA (Aragon)	JPN (Japan)	AUS (Australia)	MAL (Malaysia)	VAL (Valencian Community)	Pts	Position	Cons
2014	(United Kingdom) Danny Kent	13	8	9	11	13	15	17	8	5	12	3	9	12	3	6	20	4	4	129	8th	4th
2014	(Finland) Niklas Ajo	26	14	8	10	Ret	5	8	Ret		Ret	12	10	Ret	25	Ret	9	Ret	Ret	52	15th	4th
2015	(Spain) Isaac Viñales	6	9	3	11	7	8	7	Ret	18										115	9th	4th
2015	(Italy) Lorenzo Dalla Porta										28	19	8	11	24	24	Ret	16	22	13	25th	4th
2015	(Spain) María Herrera	22	17	Ret	Ret	19	21	15	Ret	Ret	24	23	Ret	24	13	26	11	18	21	9	29th	4th

Year	Team name	Motorcycle	No.	Riders	Races	Wins	Podiums	Poles	F. laps	Points	Pos.
2020	Sterilgarda Max Racing Team	Husqvarna FR250GP	21	(Spain) Alonso López	15	0	0	0	0	21	23rd
2020	Sterilgarda Max Racing Team	Husqvarna FR250GP	55	(Italy) Romani Fenati	15	1	1	0	1	77	14th
2021	Sterilgarda Max Racing Team	Husqvarna FR250GP	31	(Spain) Adrián Fernández	18	0	0	0	0	30	22nd
2021	Sterilgarda Max Racing Team	Husqvarna FR250GP	55	(Italy) Romano Fenati	18	1	4	3	1	160	5th
2022	Sterilgarda Husqvarna Max	Husqvarna FR250GP	71	(Japan) Ayumu Sasaki	19	2	9	2	1	238	4th
2022	Sterilgarda Husqvarna Max	Husqvarna FR250GP	17	(United Kingdom) John McPhee	17	0	1	0	0	77	13th
2023	Liqui Moly Husqvarna Intact GP	Husqvarna FR250GP	77	(Japan) Ayumu Sasaki	20	1	11	5	6	268	2nd
2023	Liqui Moly Husqvarna Intact GP	Husqvarna FR250GP	95	(Netherlands) Collin Veijer	19	1	2	2	1	149	7th
2024	Liqui Moly Husqvarna Intact GP	Husqvarna FR250GP	24	(Japan) Tatsuki Suzuki	20	0	0	0	1	91	14th
2024	Liqui Moly Husqvarna Intact GP	Husqvarna FR250GP	95	(Netherlands) Collin Veijer	20	1	9	1	2	242	3rd

== Other Ventures ==
=== Automobile manufacturing ===
Toward the end of World War II, a team comprising Bengt Magnusson (head of R&D), Stig Tham (engineer), Calle Heimdal (engine designer) and Birger Johansson investigated manufacture of a small, simple, inexpensive car. The design looked similar to the Saab 92, but with three wheels (two front, one back), and an unusual split rear window. According to some sources, the similarities with the Saab 92 may have had something to do with Sixten Sason working as designer at Husqvarna. A prototype was built in 1943, powered by a 20 hp (15 kW) two-cylinder 500 cc DKW motorcycle engine with chain drive to the rear wheel. The wheels came from a Fiat 500. The project was cancelled in 1944, and the prototype was scrapped at the end of the 1950s.

=== Bicycle manufacturing ===
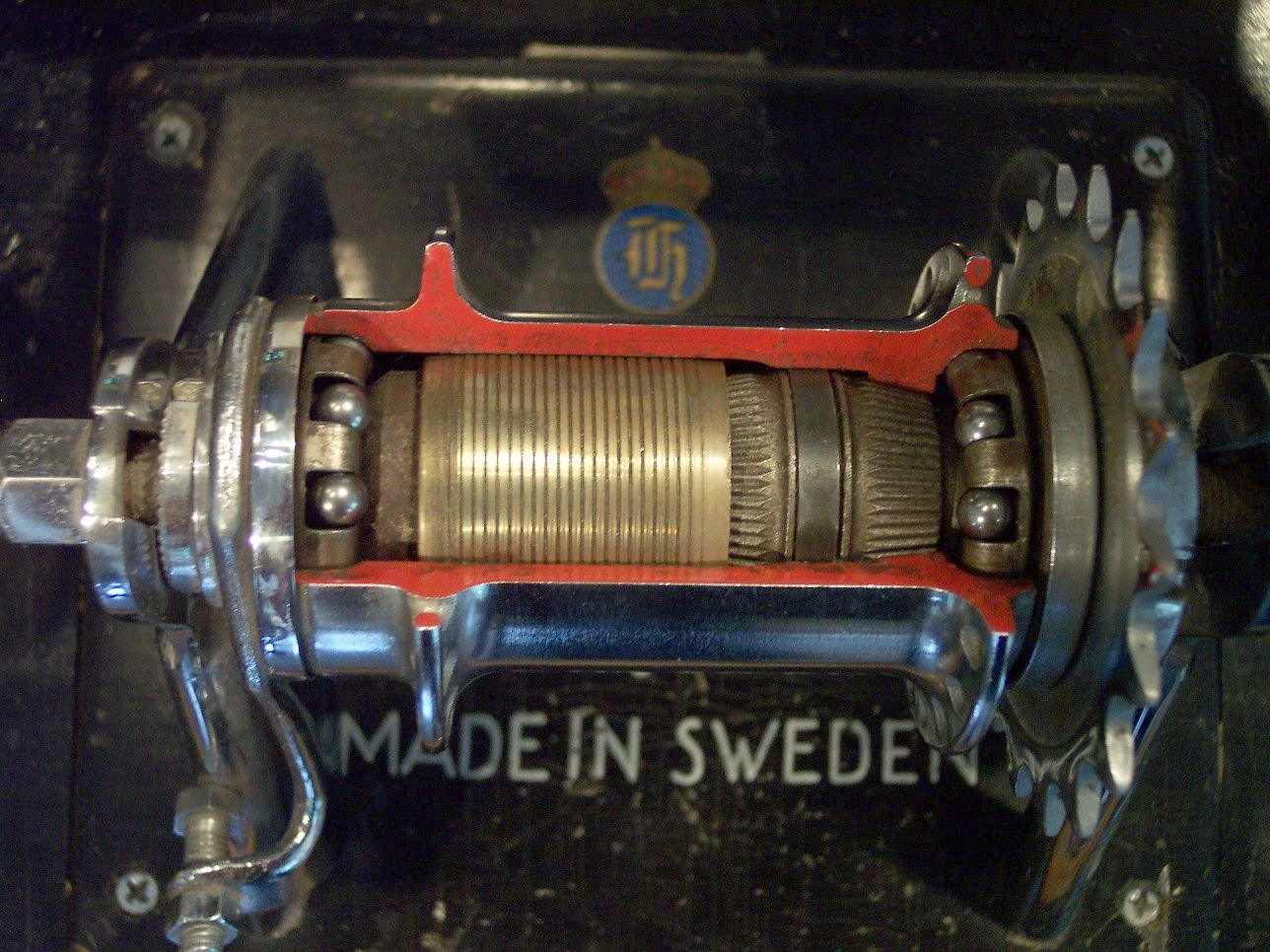
Husqvarna coaster brake

Husqvarna is also prominent in Swedish bicycle history. They have been one of the Swedish military bicycle manufacturers. Husqvarna's Novo hub competed well with imports, but bicycle manufacturing was discontinued in the early 1960s.
