= FIM Supermoto World Championship =

FIM S1GP Supermoto World Championship
- Category: Motorcycle racing
- Region: International
- Inaugural season: 2002
- Official website: www.fim-moto.com/en/sports/view/fim-s1gp-supermoto-world-championship-4993

The FIM S1GP Supermoto World Championship is the premier competition organized by FIM on the sport of supermoto racing. It takes place every year as a calendar competition on different locations across the world and it was first contested in 2002. The competition has only one class (S1) nowadays but there used to be a second class (S2) world championship that was contested between 2004-2009 and then it was dropped. The most successful rider in history in frenchman Thomas Charayre with 8 titles.

== Medalists ==
=== S1 ===
Year	Winner	Bike	Runner-up	Bike	3rd place	Bike
2002	(France) Thierry van den Bosch	KTM	(Belgium) Gerald Delepine	Husqvarna	(France) William Rubio	Husqvarna
2003	(Belgium) Eddy Seel	Husqvarna	(France) Boris Chambon	KTM	(Germany) Jürgen Künzel	KTM
2004	(France) Thierry van den Bosch	KTM	(France) Boris Chambon	KTM	(Belgium) Gerald Delepine	Husqvarna
2005	(Belgium) Gerald Delepine	Husqvarna	(Germany) Bernd Hiemer	KTM	(France) Thierry van den Bosch	KTM
2006	(Germany) Bernd Hiemer	KTM	(Italy) Ivan Lazzarini	Husqvarna	(United Kingdom) Christian Iddon	Aprilia
2007	(France) Adrien Chareyre	Husqvarna	(France) Thierry van den Bosch	Aprilia	(France) Thomas Chareyre	KTM
2008	(Germany) Bernd Hiemer	KTM	(France) Thierry van den Bosch	Aprilia	(Italy) Ivan Lazzarini	Aprilia
2009	(France) Thierry van den Bosch	TM Racing	(France) Thomas Chareyre	Husqvarna	(Italy) Ivan Lazzarini	Honda
2010	(France) Thomas Chareyre	TM	(Italy) Davide Gozzini	TM	(Finland) Mauno Hermunen	Husqvarna
2011	(France) Adrien Chareyre	Aprilia	(Italy) Ivan Lazzarini	Honda	(Finland) Mauno Hermunen	Husqvarna
2012	(France) Thomas Chareyre	TM	(Finland) Mauno Hermunen	TM	(France) Adrien Chareyre	Aprilia
2013	(Finland) Mauno Hermunen	TM	(France) Thomas Chareyre	TM	(France) Adrien Chareyre	Aprilia
2014	(France) Thomas Chareyre	TM	(Finland) Mauno Hermunen	TM	(Italy) Ivan Lazzarini	Honda
2015	(France) Thomas Chareyre	TM	(Italy) Ivan Lazzarini	Honda	(Austria) Lukas Höllbacher	Husqvarna
2016	(France) Thomas Chareyre	TM	(Germany) Marc-Reiner Schmidt	TM	(Czech Republic) Pavel Kejmar	TM
2017	(France) Thomas Chareyre	TM	(Germany) Markus Class	Husqvarna	(Germany) Marc-Reiner Schmidt	SWM
2018	Championship not held					
2019	(France) Thomas Chareyre	TM	(Germany) Markus Class	Husqvarna	(France) Laurent Fath	KTM
2020	(France) Thomas Chareyre	TM	(Germany) Marc-Reiner Schmidt	Honda	(Austria) Lukas Höllbacher	KTM
2021	(Germany) Marc-Reiner Schmidt	TM	(France) Thomas Chareyre	TM	(Austria) Lukas Höllbacher	KTM
2022	(Germany) Marc-Reiner Schmidt	TM	(France) Thomas Chareyre	TM	(Austria) Lukas Höllbacher	KTM
2023	(Germany) Marc-Reiner Schmidt	TM	(Austria) Lukas Höllbacher	KTM	(France) Thomas Chareyre	TM
2024	(Germany) Marc-Reiner Schmidt	TM	(France) Thomas Chareyre	Honda	(Italy) Elia Sammartin	Honda
2025	(Germany) Marc-Reiner Schmidt	TM	(Austria) Lukas Höllbacher	KTM	(France) Steve Bonnal	TM

=== S2 ===
Year	Winner	Bike	Runner-up	Bike	3rd place	Bike
2004	(France) Jerome Giraudo	Aprilia	(Italy) Max Verderosa	Honda	(Italy) Davide Gozzini	Husqvarna
2005	(France) Boris Chambon	KTM	(France) Adrien Chareyre	Husqvarna	(Belgium) Eddy Seel	Husqvarna
2006	(France) Thierry van den Bosch	Aprilia	(France) Jerome Giraudo	Aprilia	(France) Adrien Chareyre	Husqvarna
2007	(Belgium) Gerald Delepine	Husqvarna	(Italy) Attilio Pignotti	KTM	(United Kingdom) Christian Iddon	Aprilia
2008	(France) Adrien Chareyre	Husqvarna	(Italy) Davide Gozzini	TM	(Belgium) Gerald Delepine	Husqvarna
2009	(France) Adrien Chareyre	Husqvarna	(Belgium) Gerald Delepine	Husqvarna	(Italy) Davide Gozzini	TM
