= Husqvarna Norden 901 =

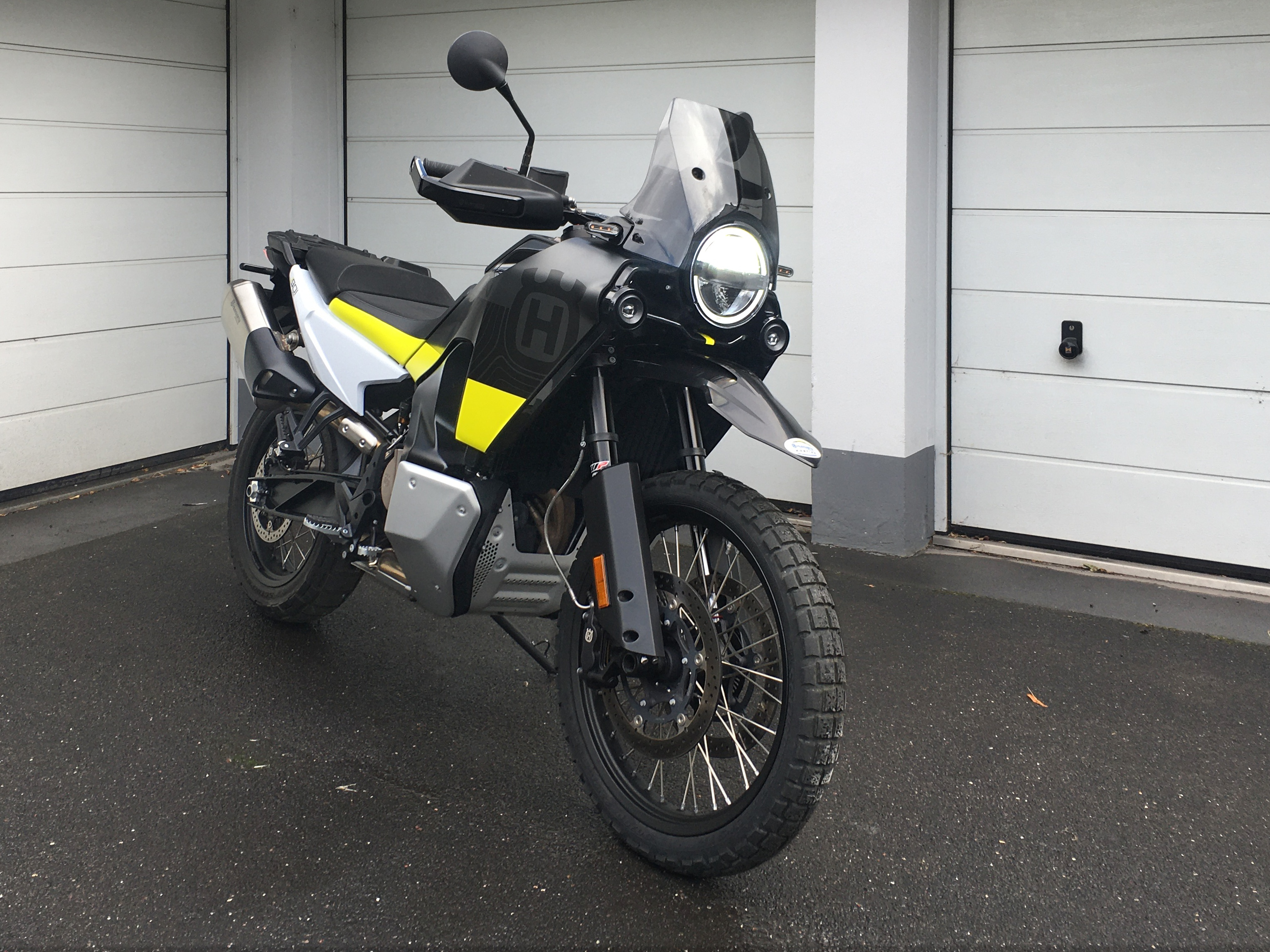
- Manufacturer: Husqvarna Motorcycles
- Production: 2021-
- Predecessor: Husqvarna TR650

The Husqvarna Norden is a dual-sport motorcycle produced by Husqvarna Motorcycles. The Swedish brand has a well-established history dating back to 1903 or so. Husqvarna Motorcycles has maintained uninterrupted production of its machines. As of 2025 its parent company is Austria's KTM and offerings share a lot of commonalities.

== History ==
The Norden 901 was first presented to the public at the EICMA 2019 Milan based motorcycle show. The Norden 901, is the largest displacement offering of the Norden branded machines and has a two-cylinder liquid cooled KTM built engine. Both Husqvarna and KTIM are subsidiaries of Pierer Mobility.

== Specifications ==
=== Engine ===
The engine of the Norden 901 is a water-cooled in-line 2-cylinder with a capacity of 889 cm^{3} (54.3 cu in), which exhibits extremely low-vibration thanks to two balancer shafts. The engine is based on the KTM LC8c engine which powers the KTM 890 Adventure.

=== Equipment ===
The equipment of the Norden 901 is similar to that of the KTM 890 Adventure in many areas. In addition to the engine, the frame and swingarm were also taken from the KTM model. There are three riding modes (Street, Rain and Offroad) as standard, with Explorer mode available as an option (comparable to KTM's Rally mode). The ABS is a cornering ABS from Bosch with street and off-road modes. The traction control is dependent on the lean angle, and can be adjusted in nine levels in Explorer mode. In addition, the Norden 901 has a ride-by-wire throttle response, a quick shifter and an anti-hopping clutch. LED auxiliary headlights are also standard. Another difference is the suspension with a fully adjustable WP Apex inverted fork and a fully adjustable WP Apex shock absorber.

== Reception ==
The Norden 901 was very well received. Especially when compared to the technically similar KTM 890 Adventure, it is described as a harmonious and "very accessible" motorcycle and an asset to the dual-sport segment and the Husqvarna brand.
