= KTM 450 series =

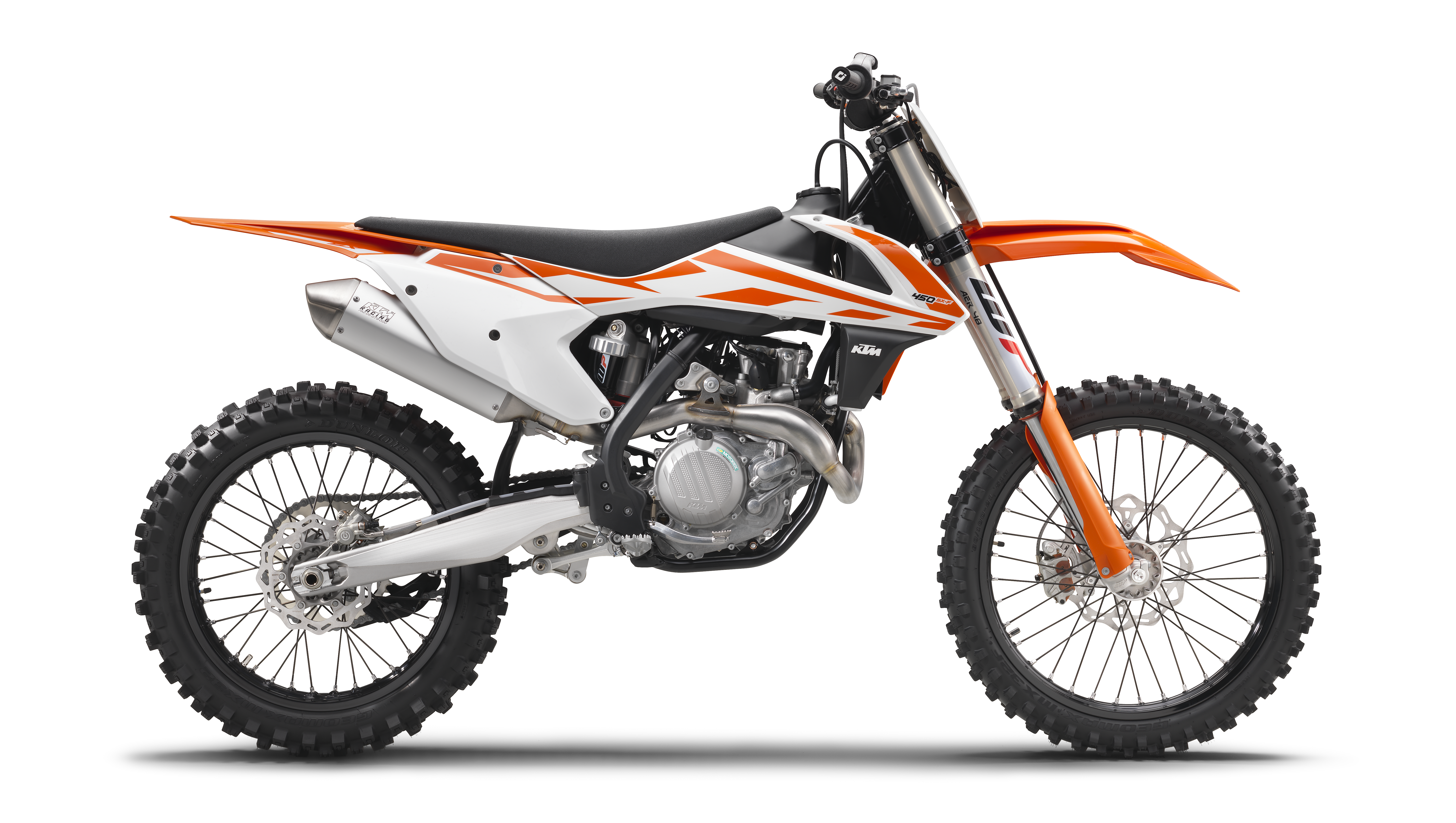
- Image of (KTM 450 SX-F)
- Manufacturer: KTM-Sportmotorcycle AG
- Also called: XC-W, XCF-W, EXC, EXC-F, SX-F, SMR
- Production: 2003-present
- Predecessor: KTM 400 EGS
- Class: Enduro / motocross
- Engine: 449.3–449.9 cc (27.42–27.45 cu in) Single-cylinder, liquid-cooled, 4 Valve, SOHC or DOHC (depending on year/model), Fuel Injected, 4-stroke
- Bore / stroke: 95 mm / 63.4 mm
- Compression ratio: ~11.9-13.1:1
- Power: 51–63 hp (38–47 kW)
- Ignition type: Kokusan contactless, electronic, digital ignition timing adjustment
- Transmission: 5-6 gears, wet clutch operated hydraulically, chain drive
- Frame type: Central double-cradle-type 25CrMo4 steel
- Suspension: Front: WP USD 48mm; fully adjustable, 300 mm travel Rear: WP single shock; fully adjustable, 335 mm travel
- Brakes: Front :260 mm / or 310 mm (SMR) ㅤ ㅤ ㅤㅤㅤ Rear: 220 mm
- Tires: 90/90-21"; 140/80-18" or (125/75-16.5"; 165/55-17" for the SMR)
- Rake, trail: 26.5°, 4.4 in (110 mm)
- Wheelbase: 1468-1495 mm
- Seat height: 898–970 mm (35.4–38.2 in)
- Weight: 103–111 kg (227–245 lb) (dry)
- Fuel capacity: 1.9–2.51 US gal (7.2–9.5 L; 1.58–2.09 imp gal)
- Related: KTM 250 EXC, KTM 350 EXC, KTM 500 EXC
- Ground clearance: 281–380 mm (11.1–15.0 in)

The KTM 450 series is a range 4-stroke off-road motorcycles made by KTM. The models are the European road legal 400 EXC and 450 EXC, the US 450 (Close Ratio) XC and 450 (Wide Ratio) XC-W. The European EXC versions have a small headlight, speedometer, tail-light and somewhat softer linkless (PDS) rear suspension. The US EXC is 50-states street legal.

== Model progression ==
=== 2000 - 2002 ===
The factory RFS (Racing Four Stroke) KTM 400 EXC won the 1999 World Enduro Championship. The 2000 RFS KTM 400 EXC had a right side kickstarter but also had the E-start button. KTM took a different approach to the configuration of the motor than most other manufacturers. While others used a 90mm-plus bore piston with a very short stroke of 60mm, the KTM RFS motor used an 89mm x 64mm boiconfiguration which provided more torque at the expense of higher RPM's.

=== 2003 ===
This was the first year of the 450 EXC model. It evolved from the earlier 400 EXC model, with an increased displacement via a longer stroke.

The new 2003 model saw changes with an updated rear sub frame, airbox, rear fender and side panels changed to one piece, changes to fuel tank, seat & carb boot, the front manifold changing from a twin pipe to single.

=== 2005-2007 ===
These years saw a new frame. Improving the handling without major changes. Rear body work changed to the single piece design off the SX model. The 2006 450 EXC made 42 hp (31 kW) and 37.5 ft-lbs. torque.

=== 2007 ===
This was the first year that the 450 EXC was offered in full factory 50-state street legal trim. The conversion of the previously available model required changes in gearing, exhaust, DOT approved tires and lights and the addition of turn signals, and a horn. Other than these changes the bike was virtually the same as the previously off-road only bike. The US off-road only version of the EXC was replaced by the XC (Close-ratio transmission) and XC-W (wide-ratio transmission) models. 2007 was also the last year of the RFS motor. The RFS is very torquey and is known to have very good reliability. In some cases, the fully stock engines last for more than 45k miles. The RFS bike is known to be a good dual sport and super motard bike. The wide ratio 6-speed transmission will run all day long on the highway. Due to their dual-sport ability, there are larger aftermarket fuel tanks available (11~26L).

=== 2008 - 2009 ===
As of 2008 the US version of the 450 EXC continued to be sold in street legal trim but was replaced by the off-road only 450 XC or 450 XC-W in the US market. A new chassis was introduced in 2008 with improvements in suspension and handling. The RFS motor available in 250 cc, 400 cc, 450 cc and 510 cc models between 2000 and 2007 was replaced with the XC4 motor beginning with the 2008 model year. The XC4 450's have more power; with a 95 mm x 63.4 mm bore and stroke producing about 51 hp (38 kW). Reliability may have gone down; some people experience top-end issues with the new engine, while others run without incident. 2008 models had oil migration issues(fixed on 2009 models).

=== 2010 - 2012 ===
Offered as the Champions Edition in 2010. New features include new front Brembo brake caliper, PDS needle design, frame welded to steering head 10mm lower, reinforced gearbox (1,2,5,6 idler gears), reworked chain adjuster & clamping rail, better tension on timing chain (noise reduction). Oil pump gears, shaft, cover and o-ring also updated on 2011 models.

=== 2012 - 2016 ===
For 2012, new features include EFI Fuel-injection, a diaphragm spring clutch and a lighter battery. The XC(W) and XC(F) models both have a plug on the right side of the engine case where a kick start lever can be added.

=== 2017 - Present ===
For 2017, KTM

A new chassis, motor, ergos, and WP XPlor 48MM forks and PDS shock. They achieved a weight reduction of 5 kg from 2016. The seat height was lowered by 10mm to 38 inches and the foot pegs raised by 6mm for better ground clearance.
