= Husqvarna Svartpilen =

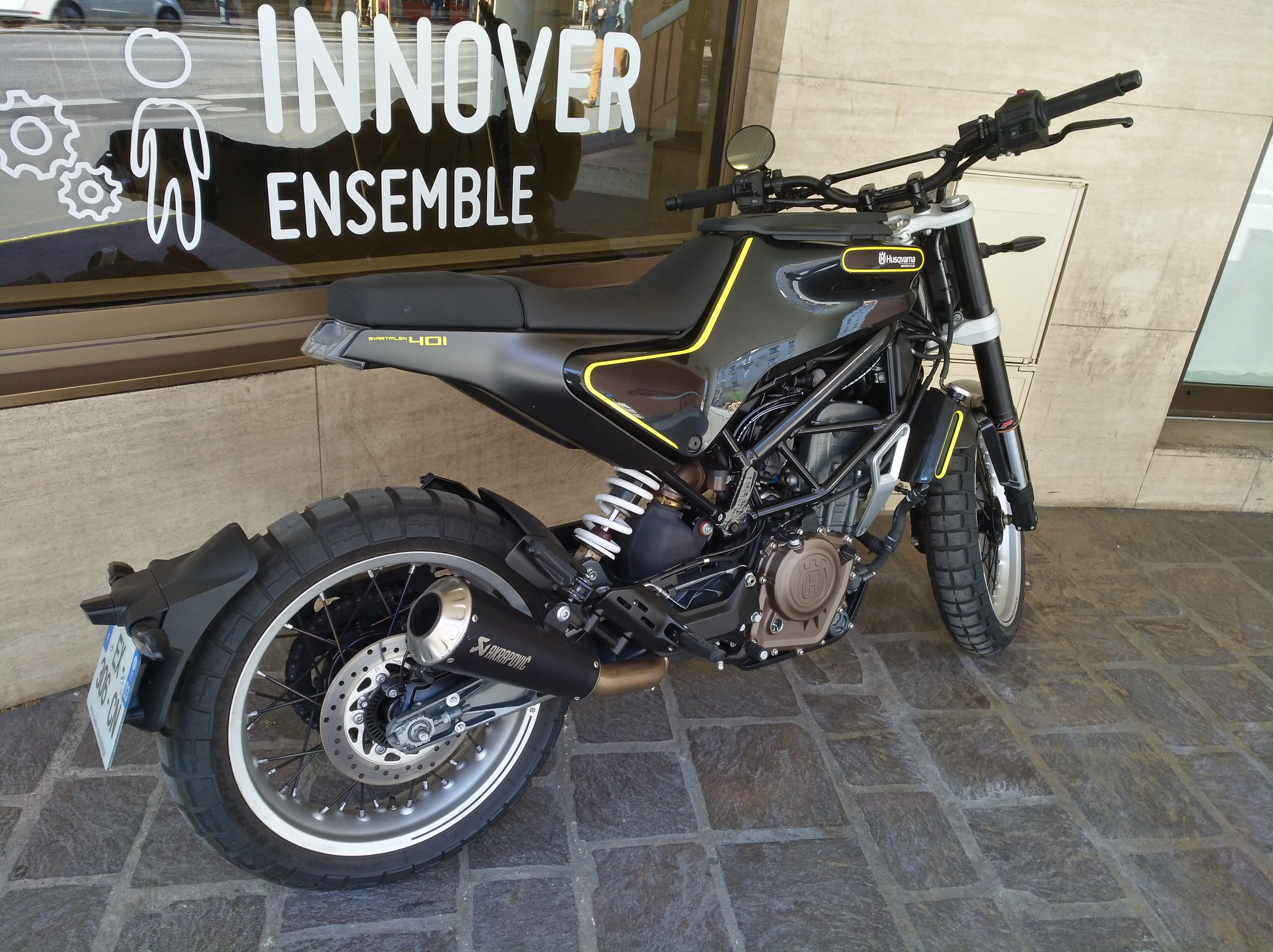
- Svartpilen 401 in Lyon, France
- Manufacturer: Husqvarna Motorcycles
- Production: 2018-

The Husqvarna Svartpilen is a line of standard motorcycles produced by Husqvarna Motorcycles. The range consists of the 125, 250 and 401 versions manufactured in India by Bajaj Auto, and the 801 model manufactured in Austria by KTM.

== History ==
Anticipated by the homonymous concept presented at EICMA 2014, the Svartpilen 401 is a compact scrambler designed by Kiska whose style recalls the motorcycles of the sixties and seventies. The naming also continues the heritage, with Silverpilen (En. ”The silver arrow”) and Guldpilen (En. ”The gold arrow”) being introduced in the early 1950:s. Together with Vitpilen, Svartpilen is part of the Swedish company's relaunch project after being acquired in 2013 by KTM. The chassis part and the engine are of KTM origin and the production was confirmed the following year. The name Svartpilen means "The black arrow". The definitive model was presented at EICMA in November 2016 and the manufacturer announced the start of production scheduled for 2017 at the KTM factory in Mattighofen in Austria. The engine is the KTM 390cc single cylinder made in India. Subsequently, due to logistical delays, the manufacturer announced at EICMA 2017 that it was re-presenting the 401, the price list of which was also announced, and also presented the brand new 701 version with a liquid-cooled 692.7 cc single-cylinder KTM LC4 engine.

The production of the Svartpilen 401 is started in the first months of 2018 followed shortly after by the 701 model. In addition to the 401 and 701 models, the range consists of the 250 variant presented at the end of 2019 and produced and sold only for the Indian and Asian markets. This model mounts the KTM 248.76 cc four-stroke DOHC engine also made in India. The 250 model was launched in India in February 2020. In December 2019, the production of the Svartpilen 401 and Vitpilen 401 was moved to India at the Chakan plant of Bajaj Auto (shareholder of the Pierer Mobility group). On the same line are produced the globally exported KTM 390 series, models that share engine and components with the Svartpilen 401 models.

In 2021, the small 125 (which can be driven with an A1 license) is introduced, produced in India by Bajaj and exported globally.

In 2024, the 401 model was released for the Indian market while the Vitpilen remained in the 250 segment.
