= KTM 500 series =

KTM 500 EXC
- Manufacturer: KTM-Sportmotorcycle AG
- Also called: KTM 500 XC-W
- Production: 1999–present
- Predecessor: KTM 530 EXC
- Class: Enduro
- Engine: 510.4 cc (31.15 cu in) Single-cylinder, liquid-cooled, 4 Valve/SOHC, Fuel Injected, 4-stroke
- Bore / stroke: 95 mm / 72 mm
- Compression ratio: 11.9:1
- Ignition type: Kokusan contactless, electronic, digital ignition timing adjustment
- Transmission: 6 gears, wet clutch operated hydraulically, chain drive
- Frame type: Central double-cradle-type 25CrMo4 steel
- Suspension: Front: WP USD 48mm; fully adjustable, 300 mm travel Rear: WP single shock; fully adjustable, 335 mm travel
- Brakes: Hydraulic single disc Front :260 mm (10.24") Rear: 220 mm (8.66")
- Tires: 90/90-21"; 140/80-18"
- Rake, trail: 26.5°, 4.3 in (110 mm)
- Wheelbase: 1,482 mm (58.3 in)
- Seat height: 970 mm (38 in)
- Weight: 113.9 kg (251 lb) (dry)
- Fuel capacity: 2.51 US gal (9.5 L; 2.09 imp gal)
- Related: KTM 250 EXC, KTM 350 EXC, KTM 450 EXC
- Ground clearance: 345 mm (13.6 in)

The KTM 500 series is a range of 4-stroke Enduro/Dual-sport Off-road motorcycles made by KTM. They are essentially the 400/450 EXCs with changes to the stroke to achieve larger displacements. The 520, 525, 530 and 500 are all in fact 510.4 cm^{3} motors given different model numbers to distinguish them. Like the other KTM enduro offerings, they vary in the set-up and components. The international EXC versions have a small headlight, speedometer, tail-light and somewhat softer linkless (PDS) rear suspension. 2007 was the first year the EXC was deemed street legal in the US. As of 2008 the US version of the EXC, with the new XC-4 motor, continued to be sold in street legal trim. In 2012, the US 50-states street legal 530 EXC-R was rebadged the 500 EXC. In mid 2016, the 2017 bikes were introduced, adding a 250cc version. It joins the 350 and 500 EXC-F.

== Model progression ==
=== 2012 ===
In 2012, the KTM 500 EXC received a significant update. Both the power unit and transmission were redesigned from the ground up. Most notably however, it now featured the latest Keihin engine management system with electronic fuel injection, which now had the ability to compensate for altitude and temperature changes. Despite the change to fuel injection, the motor was now 2.49 kg lighter, more compact, and had less reciprocating mass.

A new cylinder head featured newly designed intake and exhaust ports, with lightweight titanium valves being used on the intake side. A new, 15% lighter forged piston reduced reciprocating mass for increased durability at high engine speeds. New nitride-coated piston rings increased wear resistance. The combustion chamber had been redesigned and also received a new water jacket. A newly designed crankshaft featured a new ultra-light Pankl connecting rod, in combination with the lighter piston, helped keep vibration at a minimum.

The balancer shaft was redesigned to be more compact, and also served as the drive for the water pump. New valve chain guides and a new spring-loaded mechanical chain tensioner with a ratchet stop were used for a simpler, lighter weight design. The engine now featured a common oil circuit with two oil pumps, abandoning the previous separate oiling of the motor and transmission seen on the 530. A pressure pump lubricated the engine, while a suction pump drew oil from the crankcase, using it to lubricate the transmission and the clutch. Cooling was improved by integrating the radiator hose routing into the frame, no longer impeding airflow behind the radiators.

The cooling system also featured a new T-connector with improved flow and heat dissipation, and an auxiliary radiator fan was also fitted to improve cooling at low speeds. Cooling for the new, larger stator had also been improved, with oil-jet cooling to help cope with the increased electrical demand of the fuel injection system (196W up from 130W). The engine case was now 1.8 kg lighter than the outgoing XC4 motor, due in part to its more compact design, and the fact that it was now die-cast as opposed to being sand-cast as seen on previous models. Despite being lighter, the case was now considerably more impact resistant thanks to the use of a special high-ductility aluminium alloy.

A newly developed DDS (damped diaphragm steel) clutch featured a billet steel basket with cushioning dampers, and made use of a 250 Nm Belleville spring washer for the first time instead of the customary conical springs, greatly reducing clutch operation force. Both the clutch master and slave were produced by Brembo. The frame was completely revamped, with a noted 30% increase in lateral stiffness, as well as a reduction in size afforded by the new more compact motor, which in turn also provided better ground clearance.

A new, 300g lighter swingarm featured a more central mount for the linkless PDS (Progressive Damping System), allowing for the swingarm to be loaded more evenly. Suspension was also reworked, with a new 7mm longer WP PDS rear shock, and newly developed Teflon coated bushings and low-friction SKF oil and dust seals on the latest 48mm WP Open Cartridge forks. The wheelset featured black Giant rims with CNC machined hubs, mounted with Metzler Six Days Extreme tyres front and rear.

=== 2013 ===
In 2013, the KTM 500 EXC received only minor changes. Specially developed for KTM by MAXXIS, new tyres with increased longevity were fitted, alongside newly styled graphics for the bodywork.

=== 2014 ===
The 2014 model received a multitude of changes, most notably it featured all new bodywork inspired by the SX-F range. The front fender was now 50% stiffer than its predecessor, and accumulated much less mud thanks to a complete lack of ribbing. This new fender design required a redesign of the lower triple clamp. A new headlight and its surround were the result of four years of R&D, featuring greater light output from a smaller bulb, which enabled tidier and more crash-resistant wiring behind.

Redesigned larger handguards were now made of an ultra-sturdy two-component plastic. The airbox was redesigned for greater capacity, better airflow and improved sealing. The air filter now featured a revised latch which secured the filter better than previous years. Firmer, yet thicker seat foam developed in conjunction with footwear giant Adidas provided a much-needed improvement in comfort for longer rides. The frame lost 300g of weight, due largely to thinner cradle tubing. The clutch was upgraded with a stronger 280 Nm Belleville spring washer (up from the initial 250 Nm seen in the 2012/2013 models).

The front brake master cylinder was redesigned by Brembo to accommodate more-level mounting of the reservoir, eliminating the need to tilt the perch forward to fill the reservoir properly. A new 9mm piston (down from 10mm) was also employed to produce a noticeably more progressive brake feel, in combination with the new brake pad material. The chain guide was redesigned to be lighter without compromising on strength. An updated design of the fuel cap did away with the notoriously difficult to open caps of previous years, now being much easier to open. The thermo-switch for the auxiliary radiator fan was updated, due to the switch sometimes failing long term on 2012/2013 models.

A new under-seat ECU mount and updated fuse box further refined the tidiness of the electrical system. A more powerful battery was also fitted, improving starting strength and reliability. The 2014 model also saw the introduction of a new wheelset, featuring new Takasago EXCEL AL7 rims, CNC machined alloy hubs, zinc/nickel coated spokes and lightweight aluminium nipples, reducing the overall weight of each wheel by 200g. Upgrade of the bottom end crank bearing from a roller bearing on the 2012–13 to a more reliable plain bearing on the 2014.

	1999 – 2002	2003 – 2007	2008 – 2011	2012 – 2016	2017 – 2020	2021-current
Model Number	520	525	530	500		
Engine
Motor Type	RFS (Racing Four Stroke); 510.4cc SOHC, 4 valves per cylinder		XC4; 510.4cc SOHC, 4 valves per cylinder	510.4cc SOHC 4 valves per cylinder		510.9cc SOHC, 4 valves per cylinder
Starting	Electric Start + Kickstart				Electric Start Only	
Bore/Stroke Compression	95.0 x 72.0 mm 11.9:1					
Fuel Delivery	Keihin MX FCR 39			EFI, 42 Keihin mm throttle body		
Ignition	Contactless controlled fully electronic ignition with digital ignition adjustment					
HP Torque		61.4 hp at 7600 rpm		58 hp tbd ft-lbs	63 hp	39.4 hp 8,100 rpm
Drivetrain
Transmission		6-speed				
Clutch	Multi-disc clutch in oil bath / hydraulically operated			Wet, DDS multi-disc clutch, Brembo hydraulics		
Chassis/Suspension/Brakes
Dry Weight	113.8 kg (250.9 lbs)		114 kg (251 lbs)	111.5 kg (245.8 lbs)	109 kg (240.3 lbs)	
Front Suspension		48mm WP USD forks. 300 mm (12 in) wheel travel				
Rear Suspension		Fully adjustable WP PDS link-less 335 mm (13.2 in) wheel travel			Fully adjustable WP PDS link-less 310 mm (12.2 inches)	
Brakes	Front: Single 260 mm (10.2 in) disc with dual-piston calipers Rear:Single 220 mm (8.7 in) disc with single-piston caliper					
Tire Size	Front: 90/90 -21; Rear: 140/80 -18			Front: 90/90-21" Rear: 120/90-18"		
Dimensions
Rake & Trail	26.5 degrees / 4.4 in (110 mm)					
Wheelbase		1,425 mm (56.1 in)			1,482 mm (58.3 inches)	
Seat Height	925 mm (36.4 in)		985 mm (38.8 in)	970 mm (38.2 inches)	960 mm (37.8 inches)	
Fuel Capacity	8.5 L (1.9 imp gal; 2.2 US gal)		9.00 L (2.37 US gallons)			9.20 L (2.43 US gallons)

=== 2017 ===
The KTM 500 EXC (2017–present) is a 50 state street legal dual-sport enduro dirtbike powered by a 510 cm^{3} SOHC engine.
