= 2025 MotoGP World Championship =

77th running of the MotoGP World Championship

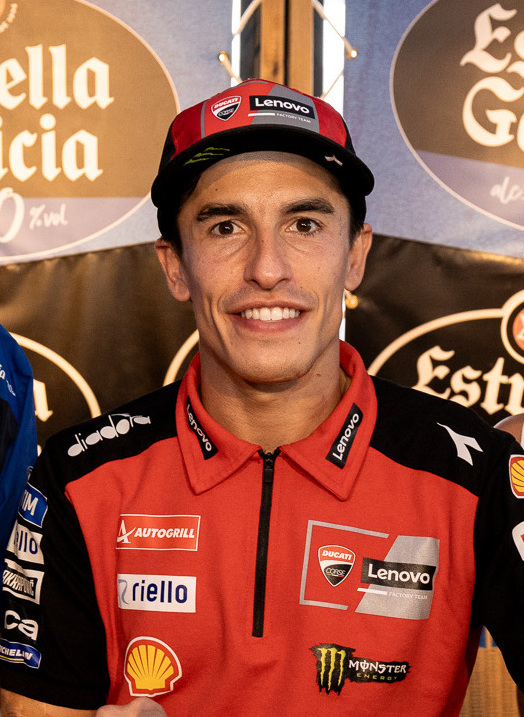
Marc Márquez was the 2025 MotoGP World Riders' Champion. His seventh premier class world title and ninth overall.

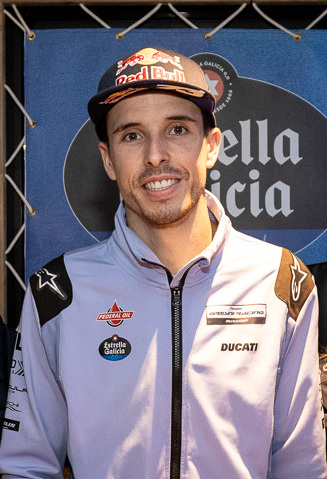
Álex Márquez (pictured in 2023) finished runner-up. His best result championship standings in the MotoGP Class and marked a historic first for Grand Prix motorcycle racing, with a pair of brothers finishing 1–2 in the championship.

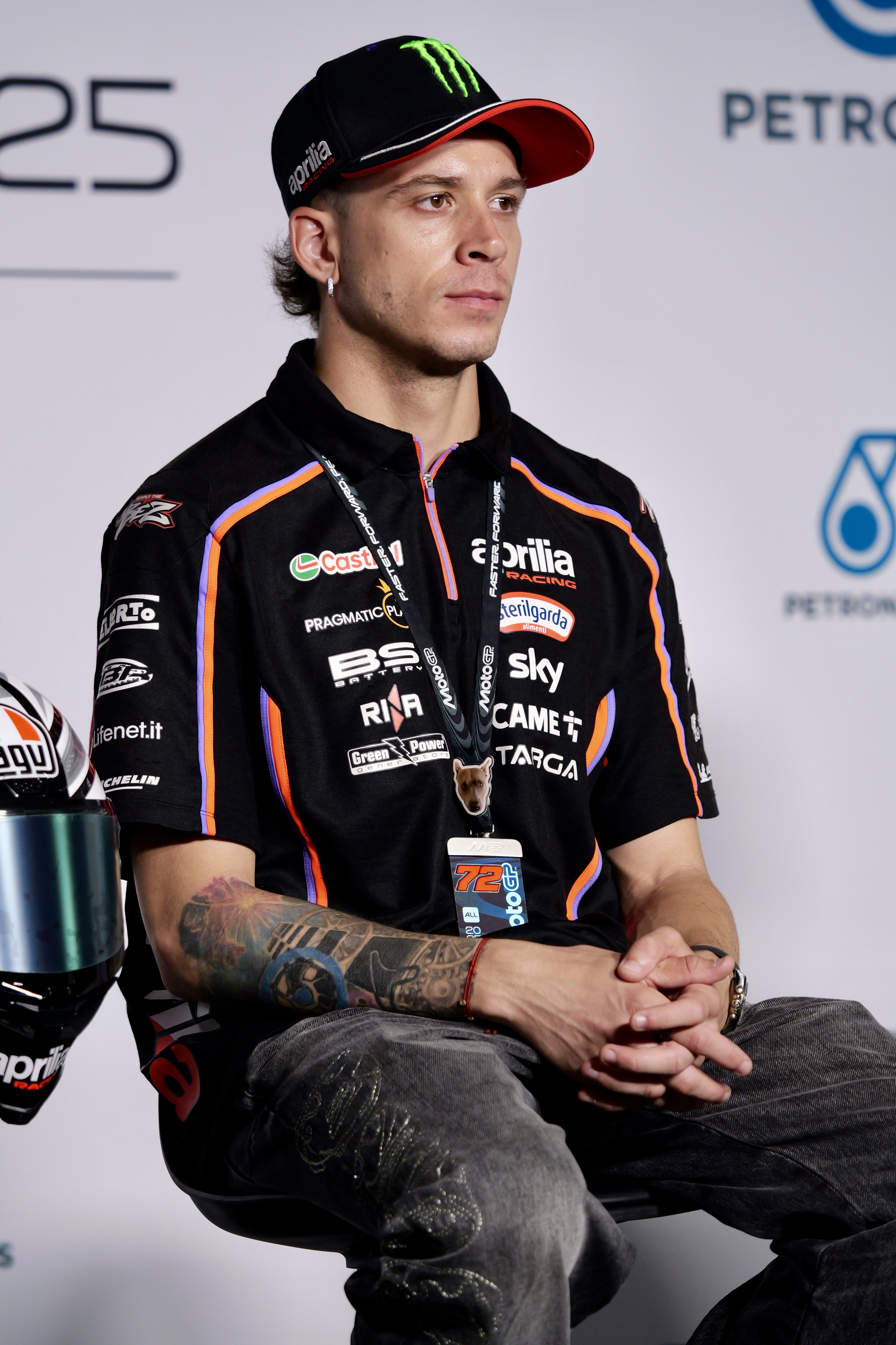
Marco Bezzecchi finished third in his first year with Aprilia machinery.

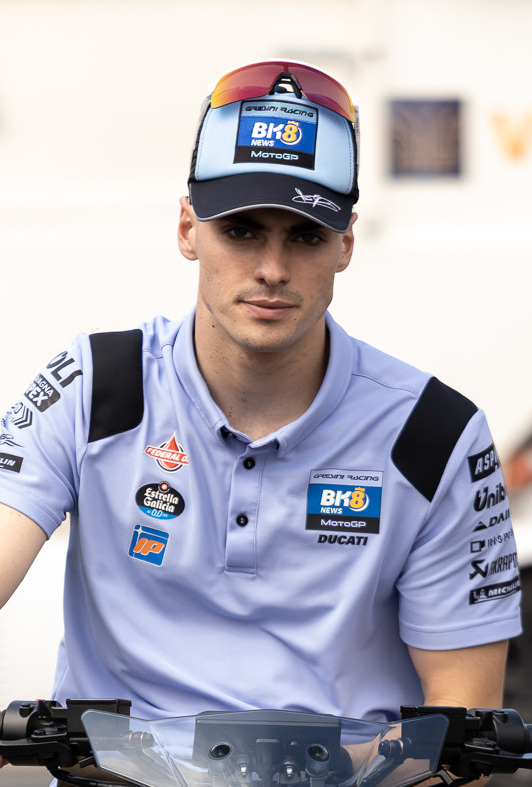
Fermín Aldeguer, the 2025 MotoGP Rookie of the Year.

The 2025 FIM MotoGP World Championship was the premier class of the 77th Fédération Internationale de Motocyclisme (FIM) Road Racing World Championship season, the highest level of competition in motorcycle road racing.

Marc Márquez clinched the Riders' Championship at the Japanese Grand Prix with five races to spare, securing his seventh premier class title (ninth overall). It was his first title since 2019, and the longest gap between successive premier class titles for any rider.

== Season summary ==
The season began without defending champion Jorge Martín, who injured his wrist in a pre-season testing crash. He made his debut with Aprilia at the Qatar Grand Prix, but he suffered fractured ribs and a pneumothorax as result of a lap 14 crash and subsequently being struck by another rider's motorcycle, which left him out of the season indefinitely. He returned for the Czech Grand Prix.

The first ten rounds of the season began with strong results for brothers Marc and Álex Márquez, who shared the top two podium positions in each of the first ten sprint races. Marc Márquez took six of the Grand Prix wins (Thailand, Argentina, Qatar, Aragon, Italy, and Netherlands) and two further podiums. He completed perfect weekends (pole, sprint win, Grand Prix win, and fastest lap) in Thailand, Argentina, Qatar, and Aragon. Alex Márquez took the Grand Prix victory in Spain with seven second-place finished in previous sprints and races. Francesco Bagnaia won the Americas Grand Prix with four third-place finished in previous sprints and races. Johann Zarco (France) and Marco Bezzecchi (United Kingdom) also took one Grand Prix victory each. Zarco's dominant finish in rainy conditions at his home Grand Prix marked the first for a Frenchman in over 70 years and Honda's first victory since April 2023, and snapped Ducati's win streak at 22 — tied with the record previously set by Honda itself. Bezzechi's victory marked Aprilia's first in over a year, since the 2024 Grand Prix of the Americas.

Marc Márquez continued his dominance at the eleventh round in Germany with his fifth perfect weekend of the season. The Grand Prix victory marked his 69th premier class win, surpassing Giacomo Agostini for second position on the all-time list, behind Valentino Rossi. At the halfway point of the season, he led the riders' championship with 344 points, ahead of Alex Márquez (261 points) and Francesco Bagnaia (197 points).

With the series returning to the Brno Circuit for the first time since 2020, Marc Márquez continued his streak of sprint and Grand Prix wins at five, setting a new record for Ducati riders. In Austria, Marco Bezzecchi started from pole position for the first time in the season, but Márquez continued his chain of sprint and Grand Prix victories to six, his first ever at the Spielberg track. The championship returned to Hungary for the first time since 1992, where Márquez further extended his winning streak to seven with his sixth perfect weekend of the season. Defending champion Jorge Martín finished the Grand Prix in fourth, his best result since returning from injury with Aprilia. At Catalunya, Marc Márquez inherited the sprint victory from brother Álex, who crashed on the third-to-last lap after leading the race from pole position. With both Aprilia factory riders crashing out of the sprint, the Ducati victory sealed their sixth consecutive constructor's championship since 2020. In the main race, Álex Márquez triumphed at his home race, ahead of brother Marc and Tech3 KTM's Enea Bastianni, ending his brother's unbeaten streak which had extended back to the Aragon sprint on 7 June. In San Marino, Marc Márquez crashed from the lead of the sprint race, allowing pole sitter Marco Bezzecchi to snap his record streak of sprint victories at eight. Both riders battled for the lead in the main race, with Márquez ultimately emerging victorious.

In Japan, Francesco Bagnaia returned to form with his first perfect weekend of the season, starting from pole to win his first sprint and his second Grand Prix of the season. Finishing runner-up in both sessions was sufficient for Marc Márquez to be crowned the 2025 champion, his seventh of the premier class and ninth overall, equalling Valentino Rossi.

In Indonesia, Marco Bezzecchi came back from a poor start to claim his second sprint win of the season. Bezzecchi would collide with Marc Márquez in the main race, causing an injured shoulder for the latter. Fermín Aldeguer dominated proceedings to win his first race in the premier class and became the second youngest rider to do so after Márquez himself. In Australia, Raúl Fernández became the seventh different winner of the season with his maiden MotoGP victory at the Phillip Island circuit, also securing a first-ever triumph for Trackhouse Racing in the premier class. After sitting out the Australian round, Márquez announced on 23 October that he would sit out the remainder of the season to focus on his injury recovery for 2026. The Malaysian Grand Prix was a big weekend for Gresini Racing, as they clinched the independent team of the year title, with Álex Márquez securing runner-up in the championship with his third victory of the season, and Fermín Aldeguer clinching Rookie of the year award. Marc and Álex Márquez marked a historic first for Grand Prix motorcycle racing, with a pair of brothers finishing 1–2 in the championship. At the final two rounds of the season in Portugal and Valencia, Álex Márquez won both sprint races, while Marco Bezzecchi was victorious in both main Grands Prix.

== Teams and riders ==
Team	Constructor	Motorcycle	No.	Rider	Rounds
(Italy) Aprilia Racing	Aprilia	RS-GP25	1	(Spain) Jorge Martín	4, 12–17, 22
(Italy) Aprilia Racing	Aprilia	RS-GP25	32	(Italy) Lorenzo Savadori	1–3, 5–11, 19–21
(Italy) Aprilia Racing	Aprilia	RS-GP25	72	(Italy) Marco Bezzecchi	All
(Italy) Aprilia Racing	Aprilia	RS-GP25	32	(Italy) Lorenzo Savadori	15
(United States) Trackhouse MotoGP Team	Aprilia	RS-GP25	25	(Spain) Raúl Fernández	All
(United States) Trackhouse MotoGP Team	Aprilia	RS-GP25	79	(Japan) Ai Ogura	1–7, 9–17, 19–22
(Italy) Ducati Lenovo Team	Ducati	Desmosedici GP25	63	(Italy) Francesco Bagnaia	All
(Italy) Ducati Lenovo Team	Ducati	Desmosedici GP25	93	(Spain) Marc Márquez	1–18
(Italy) Ducati Lenovo Team	Ducati	Desmosedici GP25	51	(Italy) Michele Pirro	19–20
(Italy) Ducati Lenovo Team	Ducati	Desmosedici GP25	11	(Italy) Nicolò Bulega	21–22
(Italy) Pertamina Enduro VR46 Racing Team	Ducati	Desmosedici GP25	49	(Italy) Fabio Di Giannantonio	All
(Italy) Pertamina Enduro VR46 Racing Team	Ducati	Desmosedici GP24	21	(Italy) Franco Morbidelli	1–11, 13–22
(Italy) BK8 Gresini Racing MotoGP	Ducati	Desmosedici GP24	54	(Spain) Fermín Aldeguer	All
(Italy) BK8 Gresini Racing MotoGP	Ducati	Desmosedici GP24	73	(Spain) Álex Márquez	All
(Monaco) Castrol Honda LCR (Monaco) Idemitsu Honda LCR	Honda	RC213V	5	(France) Johann Zarco	All
(Monaco) Castrol Honda LCR (Monaco) Idemitsu Honda LCR	Honda	RC213V	35	(Thailand) Somkiat Chantra	1–5, 7–10, 15–22
(Monaco) Castrol Honda LCR (Monaco) Idemitsu Honda LCR	Honda	RC213V	30	(Japan) Takaaki Nakagami	12
(Japan) Honda HRC Castrol	Honda	RC213V	10	(Italy) Luca Marini	1–7, 11–22
(Japan) Honda HRC Castrol	Honda	RC213V	30	(Japan) Takaaki Nakagami	9
(Japan) Honda HRC Castrol	Honda	RC213V	41	(Spain) Aleix Espargaró	10
(Japan) Honda HRC Castrol	Honda	RC213V	36	(Spain) Joan Mir	All
(Japan) Honda HRC Test Team	Honda	RC213V	41	(Spain) Aleix Espargaró	5, 7, 15, 22
(Japan) Honda HRC Test Team	Honda	RC213V	30	(Japan) Takaaki Nakagami	6, 17
(Austria) Red Bull KTM Factory Racing	KTM	RC16	33	(South Africa) Brad Binder	All
(Austria) Red Bull KTM Factory Racing	KTM	RC16	37	(Spain) Pedro Acosta	All
(France) Red Bull KTM Tech3	KTM	RC16	12	(Spain) Maverick Viñales	1–11, 13, 15–18, 22
(France) Red Bull KTM Tech3	KTM	RC16	44	(Spain) Pol Espargaró	12, 14, 19–21
(France) Red Bull KTM Tech3	KTM	RC16	23	(Italy) Enea Bastianini	All
(Japan) Monster Energy Yamaha MotoGP Team (Note: Wildcard Augusto Fernández used the team name Yamaha Factory Racing during round 8 and Yamaha Factory Racing Team during rounds 12, 16, 20, and 22.)	Yamaha	YZR-M1 (Note: The Yamaha riders used the traditional inline-four engine in all Grands Prix except during rounds 16, 20, and 22, where wildcard rider Augusto Fernández used the prototype V4 engine.)	20	(France) Fabio Quartararo	All
(Japan) Monster Energy Yamaha MotoGP Team	Yamaha	YZR-M1	42	(Spain) Álex Rins	All
(Japan) Monster Energy Yamaha MotoGP Team	Yamaha	YZR-M1	7	(Spain) Augusto Fernández	8, 12, 16, 20, 22
(Italy) Prima Pramac Yamaha MotoGP	Yamaha	YZR-M1	43	(Australia) Jack Miller	All
(Italy) Prima Pramac Yamaha MotoGP	Yamaha	YZR-M1	88	(Portugal) Miguel Oliveira	1–2, 6–22
(Italy) Prima Pramac Yamaha MotoGP	Yamaha	YZR-M1	7	(Spain) Augusto Fernández	3–5

Key
Regular rider
Replacement rider
Wildcard rider

All teams used series-specified Michelin tyres.

=== Team changes ===
- Red Bull GasGas Tech3 reverted to the Tech3 KTM name and used factory spec bikes.
- Prima Pramac Racing switched from Ducati to Yamaha on a seven-year deal.
- Repsol ended their collaboration with Honda Racing Corporation after 30 years, with Castrol taking over their title sponsorship.

=== Rider changes ===
- Fermín Aldeguer signed a Ducati factory contract in March 2024, and was confirmed to be racing for Gresini Racing on 28 August 2024 replacing the factory Ducati bound Marc Márquez.
- Aleix Espargaró announced his retirement from full-time racing at the 2024 Catalan Grand Prix. He was announced to become a test rider for Honda.
- Pedro Acosta was promoted to the Red Bull KTM Factory Racing team, replacing Jack Miller.
- Marc Márquez and Jorge Martín were linked with a move to the Lenovo Ducati factory squad throughout the first half of 2024 as the top performing Ducati satellite team riders. In Barcelona and Mugello, it was set to be confirmed that Jorge Martin would replace Bastianini, but after the Italian Grand Prix weekend, it was reported that Marquez was chosen to replace Bastianini. During the Mugello Test, Jorge Martín announced that he would be joining Aprilia Racing, replacing the retiring Aleix Espargaró. 2 days later, Ducati announced that Marc Márquez would join their factory team alongside Francesco Bagnaia.
- KTM announced Enea Bastianini and Maverick Viñales would join their Tech3 team, replacing Pedro Acosta and Augusto Fernández. The latter was confirmed as a Yamaha test rider.
- Aprilia Racing announced that Marco Bezzecchi would join alongside Jorge Martín, replacing Maverick Viñales.
- Pertamina Enduro VR46 Team announced that Franco Morbidelli would join alongside Fabio Di Giannantonio, riding a Desmosedici GP24, replacing Marco Bezzecchi.
- Trackhouse Racing announced that reigning Moto2 World Champion Ai Ogura had signed a two-year contract to ride alongside Raúl Fernández, replacing Miguel Oliveira.
- LCR Honda announced that Somkiat Chantra would join alongside Johann Zarco, replacing the retiring Takaaki Nakagami, who left the team after seven seasons and would become test rider alongside Aleix Espargaró.
- Prima Pramac Racing switched to Yamaha, and signed Miguel Oliveira and Jack Miller who would make his return to the team after his first stint for them between 2018 and 2020.

==== Mid-season changes ====
- Reigning World Champion Jorge Martín missed the Thailand, Argentine, and Americas rounds after an injury sustained while training before the start of the season. He was replaced by Lorenzo Savadori. He made his debut with Aprilia at the Qatar Grand Prix, but he suffered fractured ribs and a pneumothorax as result of a lap 14 crash and subsequently being struck by another rider's motorcycle, which left him out of the season indefinitely and further replaced by Savadori from the Spanish Grand Prix on. At the Japanese Grand Prix Sprint, he collided with teammate Marco Bezzecchi on the first lap and broke his collarbone as a result, ruling him out of Japanese, Indonesian, Australian, Malaysian, and Portuguese Grand Prix and was replaced by Savadori at Australian, Malaysian, and Portuguese Grand Prix.
- Miguel Oliveira missed the Americas, Qatar, and Jerez rounds after an injury sustained at the previous Argentine round. Augusto Fernández raced in his stead.
- After winning his seventh MotoGP World Riders' Championship, Marc Márquez suffered a right collarbone fracture and ligament injury following a collision with Aprilia rider Marco Bezzecchi during the first lap of the Indonesian Grand Prix. Ducati later confirmed that he will miss the Australian and Malaysian Grands Prix in the process, with Michele Pirro replacing him at Australian and Malaysian Grand Prix, while as Nicolò Bulega replaced him at Portuguese and Valencian Grand Prix.

== Rule changes ==
=== Mid-season rule changes ===
- From the start of Malaysian Grand Prix, riders wouldn't be allowed to rejoin qualifying sessions if they fall during the final three minutes. The same will apply to the Friday afternoon Practice session. In another small adjustment to the rules, riders have been instructed not warm up their tyres by means of zig-zagging in the pitlane.

== Calendar ==
The following Grands Prix took place in 2025:

Round	Date	Grand Prix	Circuit	Ref.
1	2 March	PT Grand Prix of Thailand	Buriram International Circuit, Buriram	
2	16 March	Gran Premio YPF Energía de Argentina	Autódromo Termas de Río Hondo, Termas de Río Hondo	
3	30 March	(United States) Red Bull Grand Prix of the Americas	Circuit of the Americas, Austin	
4	13 April	Qatar Airways Grand Prix of Qatar	Lusail International Circuit, Lusail	
5	27 April	Estrella Galicia 0,0 Grand Prix of Spain	Circuito de Jerez, Jerez de la Frontera	
6	11 May	Michelin Grand Prix of France	Bugatti Circuit, Le Mans	
7	25 May	Tissot Grand Prix of the United Kingdom	Silverstone Circuit, Silverstone	
8	8 June	GoPro Grand Prix of Aragon	MotorLand Aragón, Alcañiz	
9	22 June	Brembo Grand Prix of Italy	Mugello Circuit, Scarperia e San Piero	
10	29 June	Motul Grand Prix of the Netherlands	TT Circuit Assen, Assen	
11	13 July	Liqui Moly Grand Prix of Germany	Sachsenring, Hohenstein-Ernstthal	
12	20 July	(Czech Republic) Tissot Grand Prix of Czechia	Brno Circuit, Brno	
13	17 August	bwin Grand Prix of Austria	Red Bull Ring, Spielberg	
14	24 August	Michelin Grand Prix of Hungary	Balaton Park Circuit, Balatonfőkajár	
15	7 September	Monster Energy Grand Prix of Catalonia	Circuit de Barcelona-Catalunya, Montmeló	
16	14 September	Red Bull Grand Prix of San Marino and the Rimini Riviera	Misano World Circuit, Misano Adriatico	
17	28 September	Motul Grand Prix of Japan	Motegi Circuit, Motegi	
18	5 October	Pertamina Grand Prix of Indonesia	Mandalika International Street Circuit, Mandalika	
19	19 October	(Australia) Liqui Moly Australian Motorcycle Grand Prix	Phillip Island Grand Prix Circuit, Phillip Island	
20	26 October	Petronas Grand Prix of Malaysia	Sepang International Circuit, Sepang	
21	9 November	Qatar Airways Grand Prix of Portugal	Algarve International Circuit, Portimão	
22	16 November	Motul Grand Prix of the Valencian Community	Circuit Ricardo Tormo, Valencia	

The following Grand Prix acted as a reserve for 2025:

Grand Prix	Circuit	Ref.
(India) Indian motorcycle Grand Prix	Buddh International Circuit, Greater Noida	

=== Grand Prix locations ===
Location of non-European Grands Prix in 2025.
Location of European Grands Prix in 2025.

== Results and standings ==
=== Grands Prix ===
Round	Grand Prix	Pole position	Fastest lap	Winning rider	Winning team	Winning constructor	Report
1	Thailand motorcycle Grand Prix	(Spain) Marc Márquez	(Spain) Marc Márquez	(Spain) Marc Márquez	(Italy) Ducati Lenovo Team	(Italy) Ducati	Report
2	(Argentina) Argentine motorcycle Grand Prix	(Spain) Marc Márquez	(Spain) Marc Márquez	(Spain) Marc Márquez	(Italy) Ducati Lenovo Team	(Italy) Ducati	Report
3	(United States) Motorcycle Grand Prix of the Americas	(Spain) Marc Márquez	(Spain) Marc Márquez	(Italy) Francesco Bagnaia	(Italy) Ducati Lenovo Team	(Italy) Ducati	Report
4	Qatar motorcycle Grand Prix	(Spain) Marc Márquez	(Spain) Marc Márquez	(Spain) Marc Márquez	(Italy) Ducati Lenovo Team	(Italy) Ducati	Report
5	(Spain) Spanish motorcycle Grand Prix	(France) Fabio Quartararo	(Spain) Álex Márquez	(Spain) Álex Márquez	(Italy) BK8 Gresini Racing MotoGP	(Italy) Ducati	Report
6	(France) French motorcycle Grand Prix	(France) Fabio Quartararo	(Spain) Álex Márquez	(France) Johann Zarco	(Monaco) Castrol Honda LCR	(Japan) Honda	Report
7	(United Kingdom) British motorcycle Grand Prix	(France) Fabio Quartararo	(Italy) Marco Bezzecchi	(Italy) Marco Bezzecchi	(Italy) Aprilia Racing	(Italy) Aprilia	Report
8	Aragon motorcycle Grand Prix	(Spain) Marc Márquez	(Spain) Marc Márquez	(Spain) Marc Márquez	(Italy) Ducati Lenovo Team	(Italy) Ducati	Report
9	(Italy) Italian motorcycle Grand Prix	(Spain) Marc Márquez	(Italy) Franco Morbidelli	(Spain) Marc Márquez	(Italy) Ducati Lenovo Team	(Italy) Ducati	Report
10	(Netherlands) Dutch TT	(France) Fabio Quartararo	(Italy) Francesco Bagnaia	(Spain) Marc Márquez	(Italy) Ducati Lenovo Team	(Italy) Ducati	Report
11	(Germany) German motorcycle Grand Prix	(Spain) Marc Márquez	(Spain) Marc Márquez	(Spain) Marc Márquez	(Italy) Ducati Lenovo Team	(Italy) Ducati	Report
12	(Czech Republic) Czech motorcycle Grand Prix	(Italy) Francesco Bagnaia	(Spain) Marc Márquez	(Spain) Marc Márquez	(Italy) Ducati Lenovo Team	(Italy) Ducati	Report
13	(Austria) Austrian motorcycle Grand Prix	(Italy) Marco Bezzecchi	(Italy) Marco Bezzecchi	(Spain) Marc Márquez	(Italy) Ducati Lenovo Team	(Italy) Ducati	Report
14	(Hungary) Hungarian motorcycle Grand Prix	(Spain) Marc Márquez	(Spain) Marc Márquez	(Spain) Marc Márquez	(Italy) Ducati Lenovo Team	(Italy) Ducati	Report
15	(Catalonia) Catalan motorcycle Grand Prix	(Spain) Álex Márquez	(Spain) Álex Márquez	(Spain) Álex Márquez	(Italy) BK8 Gresini Racing MotoGP	(Italy) Ducati	Report
16	San Marino and Rimini Riviera motorcycle Grand Prix	(Italy) Marco Bezzecchi	(Spain) Marc Márquez	(Spain) Marc Márquez	(Italy) Ducati Lenovo Team	(Italy) Ducati	Report
17	(Japan) Japanese motorcycle Grand Prix	(Italy) Francesco Bagnaia	(Italy) Francesco Bagnaia	(Italy) Francesco Bagnaia	(Italy) Ducati Lenovo Team	(Italy) Ducati	Report
18	(Indonesia) Indonesian motorcycle Grand Prix	(Italy) Marco Bezzecchi	(Spain) Fermín Aldeguer	(Spain) Fermín Aldeguer	(Italy) BK8 Gresini Racing MotoGP	(Italy) Ducati	Report
19	(Australia) Australian motorcycle Grand Prix	(France) Fabio Quartararo	(Spain) Álex Márquez	(Spain) Raúl Fernández	(United States) Trackhouse MotoGP Team	(Italy) Aprilia	Report
20	(Malaysia) Malaysian motorcycle Grand Prix	(Italy) Francesco Bagnaia	(Spain) Álex Márquez	(Spain) Álex Márquez	(Italy) BK8 Gresini Racing MotoGP	(Italy) Ducati	Report
21	(Portugal) Portuguese motorcycle Grand Prix	(Italy) Marco Bezzecchi	(Spain) Pedro Acosta	(Italy) Marco Bezzecchi	(Italy) Aprilia Racing	(Italy) Aprilia	Report
22	Valencian Community motorcycle Grand Prix	(Italy) Marco Bezzecchi	(Spain) Raúl Fernández	(Italy) Marco Bezzecchi	(Italy) Aprilia Racing	(Italy) Aprilia	Report

=== Riders' standings ===
Scoring system

Points were awarded to the top fifteen finishers of the main race and to the top nine of the sprint. A rider had to finish the race to earn points.

Position	1st	2nd	3rd	4th	5th	6th	7th	8th	9th	10th	11th	12th	13th	14th	15th
Race	25	20	16	13	11	10	9	8	7	6	5	4	3	2	1
Sprint	12	9	7	6	5	4	3	2	1						

Pos.	Rider	Bike	Team	THA (Thailand)	ARG (Argentina)	AME (United States)	QAT (Qatar)	SPA (Spain)	FRA (France)	GBR (United Kingdom)	ARA (Aragon)	ITA (Italy)	NED (Netherlands)	GER (Germany)	CZE (Czech Republic)	AUT (Austria)	HUN (Hungary)	CAT (Catalonia)	RSM (San Marino)	JPN (Japan)	INA (Indonesia)	AUS (Australia)	MAL (Malaysia)	POR (Portugal)	VAL (Valencian Community)	Pts
1	(Spain) Marc Márquez	Ducati	Ducati Lenovo Team	1^{P 1 F}	1^{P 1 F}	Ret^{P 1 F}	1^{P 1 F}	12^{1}	2^{1}	3^{2}	1^{P 1 F}	1^{P 1}	1^{1}	1^{P 1 F}	1^{1 F}	1^{1}	1^{P 1 F}	2^{1}	1^{F}	2^{2}	Ret^{6}					545
2	(Spain) Álex Márquez	Ducati	BK8 Gresini Racing MotoGP	2^{2}	2^{2}	2^{2}	6^{2}	1^{2 F}	Ret^{2 F}	5^{1}	2^{2}	2^{2}	Ret^{2}	2^{8}	Ret	10^{2}	14^{8}	1^{P F}	3^{2}	6	3^{4}	4^{6 F}	1^{2 F}	2^{1}	6^{1}	467
3	(Italy) Marco Bezzecchi	Aprilia	Aprilia Racing	6	Ret^{6}	6	9^{9}	14^{8}	14	1^{4 F}	8^{8}	5^{6}	2^{3}	Ret^{2}	2^{4}	3^{P 4 F}	3^{7}	Ret	2^{P 1}	4	Ret^{P 1}	3^{1}	11^{6}	1^{P 3}	1^{P 5}	353
4	(Spain) Pedro Acosta	KTM	Red Bull KTM Factory Racing	19^{6}	8^{9}	Ret^{7}	8	7	4	6^{8}	4^{5}	8	4^{9}	Ret^{9}	3^{2}	4^{3}	2	4^{4}	Ret^{5}	17^{3}	2	5^{3}	2^{3}	3^{2 F}	4^{2}	307
5	(Italy) Francesco Bagnaia	Ducati	Ducati Lenovo Team	3^{3}	4^{3}	1^{3}	2^{8}	3^{3}	16	Ret^{6}	3	4^{3}	3^{5 F}	3	4^{P 7}	8	9	7	Ret	1^{P 1 F}	Ret	Ret	Ret^{P 1}	Ret^{8}	Ret	288
6	(Italy) Fabio Di Giannantonio	Ducati	Pertamina Enduro VR46 Racing Team	10	5^{5}	3^{4}	16^{6}	5^{6}	8^{7}	9^{3}	9^{6}	3^{5}	6^{4}	Ret^{4}	16	Ret^{8}	15^{2}	Ret^{3}	5^{3}	13	9^{8}	2^{5}	6	8^{5}	3^{3}	262
7	(Italy) Franco Morbidelli	Ducati	Pertamina Enduro VR46 Racing Team	4^{5}	3^{7}	4^{5}	3^{3}	Ret^{4}	15	4	5^{4}	6^{7 F}	7^{8}	DNS		11	6^{3}	Ret	4^{4}	5^{5}	8^{7}	15	4^{4}	Ret	Ret^{6}	231
8	(Spain) Fermín Aldeguer	Ducati	BK8 Gresini Racing MotoGP	13	16	Ret	5^{4}	Ret^{5}	3^{3}	8	6^{3}	12^{9}	Ret^{7}	5	11	2^{6}	16^{5}	15	6^{6}	10	1^{2 F}	14	Ret^{7}	4^{6}	5	214
9	(France) Fabio Quartararo	Yamaha	Monster Energy Yamaha MotoGP Team	15^{7}	14	10^{6}	7^{5}	2^{P}	Ret^{P 4}	Ret^{P 7}	Ret	14	10^{P}	4^{3}	6^{5}	15	10	5^{2}	8	8^{6}	7	11^{P 7}	5^{5}	6^{4}	Ret^{7}	201
10	(Spain) Raúl Fernández	Aprilia	Trackhouse MotoGP Team	Ret	15	12	17	15	7	12	10	7^{8}	8	9	5^{6}	9	Ret	11	11^{9}	7^{8}	6^{3}	1^{2}	Ret	DNS	2^{4 F}	172
11	(South Africa) Brad Binder	KTM	Red Bull KTM Factory Racing	8^{8}	7	Ret	13	6	Ret	14	Ret^{9}	9	11	7^{6}	8	7^{5}	7	Ret^{6}	10	12	4	8	9	5^{9}	8^{8}	155
12	(France) Johann Zarco	Honda	Castrol Honda LCR	7	6^{4}	17	4	11	1^{6}	2^{5}	Ret	Ret	12	Ret^{7}	13^{8}	12^{9}	Ret	Ret^{7}	16	9	12	Ret	12^{8}	9^{7}	12	148
13	(Italy) Luca Marini	Honda	Honda HRC Castrol	12	10	8^{8}	10	10	11	15				6	12	13	5^{4}	8^{8}	7^{7}	Ret^{7}	5	6^{8}	8	11	7	142
14	(Italy) Enea Bastianini	KTM	Red Bull KTM Tech3	9	17	7	11	9	13	17	12	Ret	9	WD	Ret^{3}	5^{7}	Ret	3^{5}	Ret	11	Ret	9	7^{9}	18	10	112
15	(Spain) Joan Mir	Honda	Honda HRC Castrol	Ret^{9}	9^{8}	Ret	Ret	Ret^{9}	Ret^{9}	10	7	11	Ret	Ret	Ret	6	Ret^{6}	12	Ret	3^{4}	Ret^{5}	Ret	3	Ret	13	96
16	(Japan) Ai Ogura	Aprilia	Trackhouse MotoGP Team	5^{4}	DSQ	9^{9}	15^{7}	8	10	DNS		10	Ret	Ret	14	14	11	6^{9}	Ret	DNS^{9}		13	10	7	Ret^{9}	89
17	(Australia) Jack Miller	Yamaha	Prima Pramac Yamaha MotoGP	11	13	5	Ret	Ret	Ret	7^{9}	14	Ret	14	8^{5}	10	18	Ret	14	12	Ret	14	Ret^{4}	14	12	9	79
18	(Spain) Maverick Viñales	KTM	Red Bull KTM Tech3	16	12	14	14	4^{7}	5^{5}	11	18^{7}	Ret^{4}	5^{6}	DNS		DNS		13	Ret	16	DNS				Ret	72
19	(Spain) Álex Rins	Yamaha	Monster Energy Yamaha MotoGP Team	17	11	11	12	13	12^{8}	13	11	15	13	10	15	16	13	Ret	Ret	18	10	7	13	13	14	68
20	(Portugal) Miguel Oliveira	Yamaha	Prima Pramac Yamaha MotoGP	14	DNS				Ret	16	15	13	Ret	Ret	17	17	12	9	9	14	11^{9}	12	19	14	11	43
21	(Spain) Jorge Martín	Aprilia	Aprilia Racing				Ret								7	Ret	4^{9}	10	13^{8}	DNS					Ret	34
22	(Spain) Pol Espargaró	KTM	Red Bull KTM Tech3												9^{9}		8					10^{9}	Ret	10		29
23	(Japan) Takaaki Nakagami	Honda	Honda HRC Test Team						6											Ret						10
23	(Japan) Takaaki Nakagami	Honda	Honda HRC Castrol									16														10
23	(Japan) Takaaki Nakagami	Honda	Idemitsu Honda LCR												DNS											10
24	(Italy) Lorenzo Savadori	Aprilia	Aprilia Racing	20	DNS	15		18	9	18	17	17	Ret	Ret				Ret				16	16	16		8
25	(Spain) Augusto Fernández	Yamaha	Prima Pramac Yamaha MotoGP			13	Ret	16																		8
25	(Spain) Augusto Fernández	Yamaha	Yamaha Factory Racing								13				18				14				18		16	8
26	(Thailand) Somkiat Chantra	Honda	Idemitsu Honda LCR	18	18	16	18	Ret		19	16	18	15					16	15	15	13	17	15	17	17	7
27	(Italy) Nicolò Bulega	Ducati	Ducati Lenovo Team																					15	15	2
28	(Spain) Aleix Espargaró	Honda	Honda HRC Test Team					17		Ret								17							Ret	0
28	(Spain) Aleix Espargaró	Honda	Honda HRC Castrol										16													0
29	(Italy) Michele Pirro	Ducati	Ducati Lenovo Team																			18	17			0
Pos.	Rider	Bike	Team	THA (Thailand)	ARG (Argentina)	AME (United States)	QAT (Qatar)	SPA (Spain)	FRA (France)	GBR (United Kingdom)	ARA (Aragon)	ITA (Italy)	NED (Netherlands)	GER (Germany)	CZE (Czech Republic)	AUT (Austria)	HUN (Hungary)	CAT (Catalonia)	RSM (San Marino)	JPN (Japan)	INA (Indonesia)	AUS (Australia)	MAL (Malaysia)	POR (Portugal)	VAL (Valencian Community)	Pts

Race key
Colour	Result
Gold	Winner
Silver	2nd place
Bronze	3rd place
Green	Points finish
Blue	Non-points finish
Blue	Non-classified finish (NC)
Purple	Retired (Ret)
Red	Did not qualify (DNQ)
Black	Disqualified (DSQ)
White	Did not start (DNS)
White	Withdrew (WD)
White	Race cancelled (C)
Blank	Did not practice (DNP)
Blank	Excluded (EX)
Blank	Did not arrive (DNA)
Blank	Did not enter (empty cell)
Annotation	Meaning
P	Pole position
Superscript number	Points-scoring position in sprint race
F	Fastest lap
Rider key
Colour	Meaning
Light blue	Rookie rider

=== Constructors' standings ===
Each constructor was awarded the same number of points as their best placed rider in each race.

Pos.	Constructor	THA (Thailand)	ARG (Argentina)	AME (United States)	QAT (Qatar)	SPA (Spain)	FRA (France)	GBR (United Kingdom)	ARA (Aragon)	ITA (Italy)	NED (Netherlands)	GER (Germany)	CZE (Czech Republic)	AUT (Austria)	HUN (Hungary)	CAT (Catalonia)	RSM (San Marino)	JPN (Japan)	INA (Indonesia)	AUS (Australia)	MAL (Malaysia)	POR (Portugal)	VAL (Valencian Community)	Pts
1	(Italy) Ducati	1^{1}	1^{1}	1^{1}	1^{1}	1^{1}	2^{1}	3^{1}	1^{1}	1^{1}	1^{1}	1^{1}	1^{1}	1^{1}	1^{1}	1^{1}	1^{2}	1^{1}	1^{2}	2^{5}	1^{1}	2^{1}	3^{1}	768
2	(Italy) Aprilia	5^{4}	15^{6}	6^{9}	9^{7}	8^{8}	7	1^{4}	8^{8}	5^{6}	2^{3}	9^{2}	2^{4}	3^{4}	3^{7}	6^{9}	2^{1}	4^{8}	6^{1}	1^{1}	10^{6}	1^{3}	1^{4}	418
3	(Austria) KTM	8^{6}	7^{9}	7^{7}	8	4^{7}	4^{5}	6^{8}	4^{5}	8^{4}	4^{6}	7^{6}	3^{2}	4^{3}	2	3^{4}	10^{5}	9^{3}	2	5^{3}	2^{3}	3^{2}	4^{2}	372
4	(Japan) Honda	7^{9}	6^{4}	8^{8}	4	10^{9}	1^{6}	2^{5}	7	11	12	6^{7}	12^{8}	6^{9}	5^{4}	8^{7}	7^{7}	3^{4}	5^{5}	6^{8}	3^{8}	9^{7}	7	285
5	(Japan) Yamaha	11^{7}	11	5^{6}	7^{5}	2	12^{4}	7^{7}	11	13	10	4^{3}	6^{5}	15	10	5^{2}	8	8^{6}	7^{9}	7^{4}	5^{6}	6^{4}	9^{7}	247
Pos.	Constructor	THA (Thailand)	ARG (Argentina)	AME (United States)	QAT (Qatar)	SPA (Spain)	FRA (France)	GBR (United Kingdom)	ARA (Aragon)	ITA (Italy)	NED (Netherlands)	GER (Germany)	CZE (Czech Republic)	AUT (Austria)	HUN (Hungary)	CAT (Catalonia)	RSM (San Marino)	JPN (Japan)	INA (Indonesia)	AUS (Australia)	MAL (Malaysia)	POR (Portugal)	VAL (Valencian Community)	Pts

=== Teams' standings ===
The teams' standings were based on results obtained by regular and substitute riders; wild-card entries were ineligible.

Pos.	Team	Bike No.	THA (Thailand)	ARG (Argentina)	AME (United States)	QAT (Qatar)	SPA (Spain)	FRA (France)	GBR (United Kingdom)	ARA (Aragon)	ITA (Italy)	NED (Netherlands)	GER (Germany)	CZE (Czech Republic)	AUT (Austria)	HUN (Hungary)	CAT (Catalonia)	RSM (San Marino)	JPN (Japan)	INA (Indonesia)	AUS (Australia)	MAL (Malaysia)	POR (Portugal)	VAL (Valencian Community)	Pts
1	(Italy) Ducati Lenovo Team	11																					15	15	835
1	(Italy) Ducati Lenovo Team	51																			18	17			835
1	(Italy) Ducati Lenovo Team	63	3^{3}	4^{3}	1^{3}	2^{8}	3^{3}	16	Ret^{6}	3	4^{3}	3^{5 F}	3	4^{P 7}	8	9	7	Ret	1^{P 1 F}	Ret	Ret	Ret^{P 1}	Ret^{8}	Ret	835
1	(Italy) Ducati Lenovo Team	93	1^{P 1 F}	1^{P 1 F}	Ret^{P 1 F}	1^{P 1 F}	12^{1}	2^{1}	3^{2}	1^{P 1 F}	1^{P 1}	1^{1}	1^{P 1 F}	1^{1 F}	1^{1}	1^{P 1 F}	2^{1}	1^{F}	2^{2}	Ret^{6}					835
2	(Italy) BK8 Gresini Racing MotoGP	54	13	16	Ret	5^{4}	Ret^{5}	3^{3}	8	6^{3}	12^{9}	Ret^{7}	5	11	2^{6}	16^{5}	15	6^{6}	10	1^{2 F}	14	Ret^{7}	4^{6}	5	681
2	(Italy) BK8 Gresini Racing MotoGP	73	2^{2}	2^{2}	2^{2}	6^{2}	1^{2 F}	Ret^{2 F}	5^{1}	2^{2}	2^{2}	Ret^{2}	2^{8}	Ret	10^{2}	14^{8}	1^{P F}	3^{2}	6	3^{4}	4^{6 F}	1^{2 F}	2^{1}	6^{1}	681
3	(Italy) Pertamina Enduro VR46 Racing Team	21	4^{5}	3^{7}	4^{5}	3^{3}	Ret^{4}	15	4	5^{4}	6^{7 F}	6^{8}	DNS		11	6^{3}	Ret	4^{4}	5^{5}	8^{7}	15	4^{4}	Ret	Ret^{6}	493
3	(Italy) Pertamina Enduro VR46 Racing Team	49	10	5^{5}	3^{4}	16^{6}	5^{6}	8^{7}	9^{3}	9^{6}	3^{5}	7^{4}	Ret^{4}	16	Ret^{8}	15^{2}	Ret^{3}	5^{3}	13	9^{8}	2^{5}	6	8^{5}	3^{3}	493
4	(Austria) Red Bull KTM Factory Racing	33	8^{8}	7	Ret	13	6	Ret	14	Ret^{9}	9	11	7^{6}	8	7^{5}	7	Ret^{6}	10	12	4	8	9	5^{9}	8^{8}	462
4	(Austria) Red Bull KTM Factory Racing	37	19^{6}	8^{9}	Ret^{7}	8	7	4	6^{8}	4^{5}	8	4^{9}	Ret^{9}	3^{2}	4^{3}	2	4^{4}	Ret^{5}	17^{3}	2	5^{3}	2^{3}	3^{2 F}	4^{2}	462
5	(Italy) Aprilia Racing	1				Ret								7	Ret	4^{9}	10	13^{8}	DNS					Ret	395
5	(Italy) Aprilia Racing	32	20	DNS	15		18	9	18	17	17	Ret	Ret								16	16	16		395
5	(Italy) Aprilia Racing	72	6	Ret^{6}	6	9^{9}	14^{8}	14	1^{4 F}	8^{8}	5^{6}	2^{3}	Ret^{2}	2^{4}	3^{P 4 F}	3^{7}	Ret	2^{P 1}	4	Ret^{P 1}	3^{1}	11^{6}	1^{P 3}	1^{P 5}	395
6	(Japan) Monster Energy Yamaha MotoGP Team	20	15^{7}	14	10^{6}	7^{5}	2^{P}	Ret^{P 4}	Ret^{P 7}	Ret	14	10^{P}	4^{3}	6^{5}	15	10	5^{2}	8	8^{6}	7	11^{P 7}	5^{5}	6^{4}	Ret^{7}	269
6	(Japan) Monster Energy Yamaha MotoGP Team	42	17	11	11	12	13	12^{8}	13	11	15	13	10	15	16	13	Ret	Ret	18	10	7	13	13	14	269
7	(United States) Trackhouse MotoGP Team	25	Ret	15	12	17	15	7	12	10	7^{8}	8	9	5^{6}	9	Ret	11	11^{9}	7^{8}	6^{3}	1^{2}	Ret	DNS	2^{4 F}	261
7	(United States) Trackhouse MotoGP Team	79	5^{4}	DSQ	9^{9}	15^{7}	8	10	DNS		10	Ret	Ret	14	14	11	6^{9}	Ret	DNS^{9}		13	10	7	Ret^{9}	261
8	(Japan) Honda HRC Castrol	10	12	10	8^{8}	10	10	11	15				6	12	13	5^{4}	8^{8}	7^{7}	Ret^{7}	5	6^{8}	8	11	7	238
8	(Japan) Honda HRC Castrol	30									16														238
8	(Japan) Honda HRC Castrol	36	Ret^{9}	9^{8}	Ret	Ret	Ret^{9}	Ret^{9}	10	7	11	Ret	Ret	Ret	6	Ret^{6}	12	Ret	3^{4}	Ret^{5}	Ret	3	Ret	13	238
8	(Japan) Honda HRC Castrol	41										16													238
9	(France) Red Bull KTM Tech3	12	16	12	14	14	4^{7}	5^{5}	11	18^{7}	Ret^{4}	5^{6}	DNS		DNS		13	Ret	16	DNS				Ret	213
9	(France) Red Bull KTM Tech3	23	9	17	7	11	9	13	17	12	Ret	9	WD	Ret^{3}	5^{7}	Ret	3^{5}	Ret	11	Ret	9	7^{9}	18	10	213
9	(France) Red Bull KTM Tech3	44												9^{9}		8					10^{9}	Ret	10		213
10	(Monaco) LCR Honda	5	7	6^{4}	17	4	11	1^{6}	2^{5}	Ret	Ret	12	Ret^{7}	13^{8}	12^{9}	Ret	Ret^{7}	16	9	12	Ret	12^{8}	9^{7}	12	155
10	(Monaco) LCR Honda	30												DNS											155
10	(Monaco) LCR Honda	35	18	18	16	18	Ret		19	16	18	15					16	15	15	13	17	15	17	17	155
11	(Italy) Prima Pramac Yamaha MotoGP	7			13	Ret	16																		125
11	(Italy) Prima Pramac Yamaha MotoGP	43	11	13	5	Ret	Ret	Ret	7^{9}	14	Ret	14	8^{5}	10	18	Ret	14	12	Ret	14	Ret^{4}	14	12	9	125
11	(Italy) Prima Pramac Yamaha MotoGP	88	14	DNS				Ret	16	15	13	Ret	Ret	17	17	12	9	9	14	11^{9}	12	18	14	11	125
Pos.	Team	Bike No.	THA (Thailand)	ARG (Argentina)	AME (United States)	QAT (Qatar)	SPA (Spain)	FRA (France)	GBR (United Kingdom)	ARA (Aragon)	ITA (Italy)	NED (Netherlands)	GER (Germany)	CZE (Czech Republic)	AUT (Austria)	HUN (Hungary)	CAT (Catalonia)	RSM (San Marino)	JPN (Japan)	INA (Indonesia)	AUS (Australia)	MAL (Malaysia)	POR (Portugal)	VAL (Valencian Community)	Pts
