= 2025 Qatar motorcycle Grand Prix =

Motorcycle races in Lusail

2025 Qatar Grand Prix
Race details
- Race 4 of 22 races in the 2025 Grand Prix motorcycle racing season
- Date: 13 April 2025
- Official name: Qatar Airways Grand Prix of Qatar
- Location: Lusail International Circuit; Lusail, Qatar
- Course: Permanent racing facility; 5.380 km (3.343 mi)

MotoGP
Pole position
Rider	(Spain) Marc Márquez	Ducati
Time	1:50.499	
Fastest lap
Rider	(Spain) Marc Márquez	Ducati
Time	1:52.561 on lap 19	
Podium
First	(Spain) Marc Márquez	Ducati
Second	(Italy) Francesco Bagnaia	Ducati
Third	(Italy) Franco Morbidelli	Ducati

Moto2
Pole position
Rider	(Spain) Manuel González	Kalex
Time	1:56.301	
Fastest lap
Rider	(Belgium) Barry Baltus	Kalex
Time	1:57.646 on lap 11	
Podium
First	(Spain) Arón Canet	Kalex
Second	(Turkey) Deniz Öncü	Kalex
Third	(Spain) Manuel González	Kalex

Moto3
Pole position
Rider	(Japan) Ryusei Yamanaka	KTM
Time	2:02.638	
Fastest lap
Rider	(Spain) David Muñoz	KTM
Time	2:03.743 on lap 8	
Podium
First	(Spain) Ángel Piqueras	KTM
Second	(Japan) Taiyo Furusato	Honda
Third	(Japan) Ryusei Yamanaka	KTM

The 2025 Qatar motorcycle Grand Prix (officially known as the Qatar Airways Grand Prix of Qatar) was the fourth round of the 2025 Grand Prix motorcycle racing season. All races were held at the Lusail International Circuit in Lusail on 13 April 2025.

== Practice session ==
=== MotoGP ===
==== Combined Free Practice 1-2 ====
Practice times (written in bold) are the fastest times in the session.

Fastest session lap

Pos.	No.	Biker	Constructor	Practice times	
Pos.	No.	Biker	Constructor	P1	P2
1	93	(Spain) Marc Márquez	Ducati	1:52.288	**1:51.877**
2	73	(Spain) Álex Márquez	Ducati	1:52.945	**1:52.109**
3	20	(France) Fabio Quartararo	Yamaha	1:53.322	**1:52.356**
4	5	(France) Johann Zarco	Honda	1:53.477	**1:52.393**
5	37	(Spain) Pedro Acosta	KTM	1:53.297	**1:52.432**
6	12	(Spain) Maverick Viñales	KTM	1:53.162	**1:52.504**
7	54	(Spain) Fermín Aldeguer	Ducati	1:53.198	**1:52.513**
8	72	(Italy) Marco Bezzecchi	Aprilia	1:53.225	**1:52.634**
9	79	(Japan) Ai Ogura	Aprilia	1:53.507	**1:52.693**
10	42	(Spain) Álex Rins	Yamaha	1:53.430	**1:52.730**
11	63	(Italy) Francesco Bagnaia	Ducati	1:52.871	**1:52.759**
12	21	(Italy) Franco Morbidelli	Ducati	1:53.193	**1:52.781**
13	49	(Italy) Fabio Di Giannantonio	Ducati	**1:52.801**	1:52.830
14	33	(South Africa) Brad Binder	KTM	1:53.651	**1:52.898**
15	10	(Italy) Luca Marini	Honda	1:53.361	**1:52.987**
16	1	(Spain) Jorge Martín	Aprilia	1:54.112	**1:53.071**
17	36	(Spain) Joan Mir	Honda	1:53.223	**1:53.087**
18	25	(Spain) Raúl Fernández	Aprilia	1:54.114	**1:53.186**
19	23	(Italy) Enea Bastianini	KTM	1:53.726	**1:53.404**
20	43	(Australia) Jack Miller	Yamaha	1:54.107	**1:53.425**
21	7	(Spain) Augusto Fernández	Yamaha	1:53.517	**1:53.516**
22	35	(Thailand) Somkiat Chantra	Honda	1:54.364	**1:54.334**
OFFICIAL MOTOGP COMBINED PRACTICE TIMES REPORT

==== Practice ====
The top 10 riders (written in bold) qualified for Q2.

Fastest session lap

Pos.	No.	Biker	Constructor	
Pos.	No.	Biker	Constructor	Time results
1	21	**(Italy) Franco Morbidelli**	**Ducati**	**1:50.830**
2	63	**(Italy) Francesco Bagnaia**	**Ducati**	**1:50.975**
3	93	**(Spain) Marc Márquez**	**Ducati**	**1:50.997**
4	49	**(Italy) Fabio Di Giannantonio**	**Ducati**	**1:51.129**
5	73	**(Spain) Álex Márquez**	**Ducati**	**1:51.236**
6	20	**(France) Fabio Quartararo**	**Yamaha**	**1:51.293**
7	37	**(Spain) Pedro Acosta**	**KTM**	**1:51.391**
8	12	**(Spain) Maverick Viñales**	**KTM**	**1:51.455**
9	54	**(Spain) Fermín Aldeguer**	**Ducati**	**1:51.615**
10	5	**(France) Johann Zarco**	**Honda**	**1:51.636**
11	42	(Spain) Álex Rins	Yamaha	1:51.666
12	10	(Italy) Luca Marini	Honda	1:51.775
13	36	(Spain) Joan Mir	Honda	1:51.784
14	33	(South Africa) Brad Binder	KTM	1:51.833
15	79	(Japan) Ai Ogura	Aprilia	1:51.948
16	23	(Italy) Enea Bastianini	KTM	1:52.005
17	43	(Australia) Jack Miller	Yamaha	1:52.024
18	25	(Spain) Raúl Fernández	Aprilia	1:52.134
19	72	(Italy) Marco Bezzecchi	Aprilia	1:52.180
20	1	(Spain) Jorge Martín	Aprilia	1:52.398
21	7	(Spain) Augusto Fernández	Yamaha	1:52.415
22	35	(Thailand) Somkiat Chantra	Honda	1:53.010
OFFICIAL MOTOGP PRACTICE TIMES REPORT

=== Moto2 ===
==== Combined Practice 1-2 ====
The top 14 riders (written in bold) qualified for Q2.

Fastest session lap

Pos.	No.	Biker	Constructor	Practice times	
Pos.	No.	Biker	Constructor	P1	P2
1	75	(Spain) Albert Arenas	Kalex	1:58.228	1:57.573
2	18	(Spain) Manuel González	Kalex	1:57.689	1:57.575
3	27	(Spain) Daniel Holgado	Kalex	1:58.460	1:57.723
4	44	(Spain) Arón Canet	Kalex	1:57.967	1:57.723
5	96	(United Kingdom) Jake Dixon	Boscoscuro	1:58.205	1:57.938
6	81	(Australia) Senna Agius	Kalex	1:58.676	1:58.049
7	7	(Belgium) Barry Baltus	Kalex	1:58.229	1:58.051
8	16	(United States) Joe Roberts	Kalex	1:58.713	1:58.081
9	53	(Turkey) Deniz Öncü	Kalex	1:58.138	1:58.126
10	84	(Netherlands) Zonta van den Goorbergh	Kalex	1:58.758	1:58.168
11	21	(Spain) Alonso López	Boscoscuro	1:59.335	1:58.177
12	10	(Brazil) Diogo Moreira	Kalex	1:58.919	1:58.250
13	80	(Colombia) David Alonso	Kalex	1:58.653	1:58.270
14	64	(Indonesia) Mario Aji	Kalex	1:58.385	1:58.274
15	95	(Netherlands) Collin Veijer	Kalex	1:59.479	1:58.393
16	13	(Italy) Celestino Vietti	Boscoscuro	1:59.479	1:58.422
17	4	(Spain) Iván Ortolá	Boscoscuro	1:59.688	1:58.441
18	92	(Japan) Yuki Kunii	Kalex	1:59.636	1:58.485
19	11	(Spain) Álex Escrig	Forward	1:58.987	1:58.516
20	12	(Czech Republic) Filip Salač	Boscoscuro	1:58.560	1:58.660
21	24	(Spain) Marcos Ramírez	Kalex	1:58.674	1:58.571
22	99	(Spain) Adrián Huertas	Kalex	1:58.994	1:58.604
23	28	(Spain) Izan Guevara	Boscoscuro	1:59.022	1:58.867
24	14	(Italy) Tony Arbolino	Boscoscuro	1:59.117	1:58.881
25	15	(South Africa) Darryn Binder	Kalex	1:59.525	1:58.917
26	71	(Japan) Ayumu Sasaki	Kalex	1:59.334	1:58.924
27	3	(Spain) Sergio García	Boscoscuro	1:59.593	1:58.943
28	9	(Spain) Jorge Navarro	Forward	1:59.846	1:59.014
OFFICIAL MOTO2 FREE PRACTICE TIMES REPORT

==== Practice ====
Pos.	No.	Biker	Constructor	Time results
Pos.	No.	Biker	Constructor	P1
1	18	(Spain) Manuel González	Kalex	1:57.073
2	44	(Spain) Arón Canet	Kalex	1:57.095
3	27	(Spain) Daniel Holgado	Kalex	1:57.136
4	53	(Turkey) Deniz Öncü	Kalex	1:57.149
5	75	(Spain) Albert Arenas	Kalex	1:57.206
6	84	(Netherlands) Zonta van den Goorbergh	Kalex	1:57.314
7	7	(Belgium) Barry Baltus	Kalex	1:57.352
8	24	(Spain) Marcos Ramírez	Kalex	1:57.504
9	80	(Colombia) David Alonso	Kalex	1:57.507
10	96	(United Kingdom) Jake Dixon	Boscoscuro	1:57.515
11	21	(Spain) Alonso López	Boscoscuro	1:57.655
12	99	(Spain) Adrián Huertas	Kalex	1:57.689
13	64	(Indonesia) Mario Aji	Kalex	1:57.691
14	15	(South Africa) Darryn Binder	Kalex	1:57.767
15	9	(Spain) Jorge Navarro	Forward	1:57.808
16	95	(Netherlands) Collin Veijer	Kalex	1:57.875
17	81	(Australia) Senna Agius	Kalex	1:57.896
18	10	(Brazil) Diogo Moreira	Kalex	1:57.896
19	28	(Spain) Izan Guevara	Boscoscuro	1:57.964
20	12	(Czech Republic) Filip Salač	Boscoscuro	1:57.994
21	11	(Spain) Álex Escrig	Forward	1:58.027
22	16	(United States) Joe Roberts	Kalex	1:58.063
23	71	(Japan) Ayumu Sasaki	Kalex	1:58.261
24	4	(Spain) Iván Ortolá	Boscoscuro	1:58.377
25	14	(Italy) Tony Arbolino	Boscoscuro	1:58.451
26	13	(Italy) Celestino Vietti	Boscoscuro	1:58.549
27	92	(Japan) Yuki Kunii	Kalex	1:58.636
28	66	(Spain) Sergio García	Boscoscuro	1:58.979
OFFICIAL MOTO2 PRACTICE TIMES REPORT

=== Moto3 ===
==== Combined Practice 1-2 ====
Fastest session lap

Pos.	No.	Biker	Constructor	Practice times	
Pos.	No.	Biker	Constructor	P1	P2
1	99	(Spain) José Antonio Rueda	KTM	2:04.662	2:03.357
2	31	(Spain) Adrián Fernández	Honda	2:05.366	2:03.629
3	64	(Spain) David Muñoz	KTM	2:04.556	2:03.670
4	66	(Australia) Joel Kelso	KTM	2:05.052	2:03.756
5	36	(Spain) Ángel Piqueras	KTM	2:05.355	2:03.856
6	58	(Italy) Luca Lunetta	Honda	2:05.149	2:03.920
7	83	(Spain) Álvaro Carpe	KTM	2:05.648	2:03.949
8	6	(Japan) Ryusei Yamanaka	KTM	2:04.571	2:04.080
9	94	(Italy) Guido Pini	KTM	2:05.046	2:04.111
10	19	(United Kingdom) Scott Ogden	KTM	2:05.771	2:04.412
11	72	(Japan) Taiyo Furusato	Honda	2:05.804	2:04.471
12	28	(Spain) Joel Esteban	KTM	N/A	2:04.497
13	22	(Spain) David Almansa	Honda	2:05.449	2:04.515
14	21	(South Africa) Ruche Moodley	KTM	2:06.053	2:04.531
15	12	(Australia) Jacob Roulstone	KTM	2:06.592	2:04.601
16	8	(United Kingdom) Eddie O'Shea	Honda	2:06.044	2:04.625
17	73	(Argentina) Valentín Perrone	KTM	2:06.890	2:04.736
18	14	(New Zealand) Cormac Buchanan	KTM	2:06.654	2:04.828
19	71	(Italy) Dennis Foggia	KTM	2:05.318	2:04.878
20	10	(Italy) Nicola Carraro	Honda	2:06.242	2:05.278
21	34	(Switzerland) Noah Dettwiler	KTM	2:07.199	2:05.355
22	82	(Italy) Stefano Nepa	Honda	2:05.611	2:05.399
23	54	(Italy) Riccardo Rossi	Honda	2:05.873	2:05.679
24	5	(Thailand) Tatchakorn Buasri	Honda	2:05.962	2:06.895
25	11	(Spain) Adrián Cruces	KTM	2:06.700	N/A
OFFICIAL MOTO3 FREE PRACTICE TIMES REPORT

==== Practice ====
The top 14 riders (written in bold) qualified for Q2.

Pos.	No.	Biker	Constructor	Practice times
Pos.	No.	Biker	Constructor	P1
1	99	(Spain) **José Antonio Rueda**	**KTM**	**2:03.277**
2	6	(Japan) **Ryusei Yamanaka**	**KTM**	**2:03.521**
3	36	(Spain) **Ángel Piqueras**	**KTM**	**2:03.591**
4	71	(Italy) **Dennis Foggia**	**KTM**	**2:03.625**
5	54	(Italy) **Riccardo Rossi**	**Honda**	**2:03.786**
6	64	(Spain) **David Muñoz**	**KTM**	**2:03.897**
7	83	(Spain) **Álvaro Carpe**	**KTM**	**2:04.070**
8	72	(Japan) **Taiyo Furusato**	**Honda**	**2:04.108**
9	10	(Italy) **Nicola Carraro**	**Honda**	**2:04.139**
10	58	(Italy) **Luca Lunetta**	**Honda**	**2:04.233**
11	19	(United Kingdom) **Scott Ogden**	**KTM**	**2:04.266**
12	94	(Italy) **Guido Pini**	**KTM**	**2:04.316**
13	66	(Australia) **Joel Kelso**	**KTM**	**2:04.323**
14	5	(Thailand) **Tatchakorn Buasri**	**Honda**	**2:04.451**
15	12	(Australia) Jacob Roulstone	KTM	2:04.480
16	31	(Spain) Adrián Fernández	Honda	2:04.630
17	22	(Spain) David Almansa	Honda	2:04.777
18	14	(New Zealand) Cormac Buchanan	KTM	2:04.804
19	8	(United Kingdom) Eddie O'Shea	Honda	2:04.813
20	82	(Italy) Stefano Nepa	Honda	2:04.846
21	21	(South Africa) Ruche Moodley	KTM	2:05.017
22	73	(Argentina) Valentín Perrone	KTM	2:05.082
23	34	(Switzerland)	KTM	2:06.023
OFFICIAL MOTO3 PRACTICE TIMES REPORT

== Qualifying ==
=== MotoGP ===
Fastest session lap

Pos.	No.	Biker	Constructor	Qualifying times		Final grid	Row
Pos.	No.	Biker	Constructor	Q1	Q2	Final grid	Row
1	93	(Spain) Marc Márquez	Ducati	Qualified in Q2	1:50.499	1	1
2	73	(Spain) Álex Márquez	Ducati	Qualified in Q2	1:50.600	2	1
3	20	(France) Fabio Quartararo	Yamaha	Qualified in Q2	1:50.759	3	1
4	21	(Italy) Franco Morbidelli	Ducati	Qualified in Q2	1:50.810	4	2
5	49	(Italy) Fabio Di Giannantonio	Ducati	Qualified in Q2	1:50.929	5	2
6	12	(Spain) Maverick Viñales	KTM	Qualified in Q2	1:51.059	6	2
7	5	(France) Johann Zarco	Honda	Qualified in Q2	1:51.113	7	3
8	54	(Spain) Fermín Aldeguer	Ducati	Qualified in Q2	1:51.121	8	3
9	42	(Spain) Álex Rins	Yamaha	1:51.512	1:51.174	9	3
10	79	(Japan) Ai Ogura	Aprilia	1:51.104	1:51.340	10	4
11	63	(Italy) Francesco Bagnaia	Ducati	Qualified in Q2	1:51.580	11	4
12	37	(Spain) Pedro Acosta	KTM	Qualified in Q2	1:51.680	12	4
13	72	(Italy) Marco Bezzecchi	Aprilia	1:51.553	N/A	13	5
14	1	(Spain) Jorge Martín	Aprilia	1:51.655	N/A	14	5
15	10	(Italy) Luca Marini	Honda	1:51.728	N/A	15	5
16	43	(Australia) Jack Miller	Yamaha	1:51.735	N/A	16	6
17	37	(Spain) Raúl Fernández	Aprilia	1:51.822	N/A	17	6
18	33	(South Africa) Brad Binder	KTM	1:51.947	N/A	18	6
19	7	(Spain) Augusto Fernández	Yamaha	1:51.975	N/A	19	7
20	23	(Italy) Enea Bastianini	KTM	1:52.178	N/A	20	7
21	36	(Spain) Joan Mir	Honda	1:52.205	N/A		
22	35	(Thailand) Somkiat Chantra	Honda	1:53.244	N/A	21	7
QATAR AIRWAYS GRAND PRIX OF QATAR MOTOGP QUALIFYING RESULTS

=== Moto2 ===
Fastest session lap

Pos.	No.	Biker	Constructor	Qualifying times		Final grid	Row
Pos.	No.	Biker	Constructor	P1	P2	Final grid	Row
1	18	(Spain) Manuel González	Kalex	Qualified in Q2	1:56.301	1	1
2	96	(United Kingdom) Jake Dixon	Boscoscuro	Qualified in Q2	1:56.469	2	1
3	44	(Spain) Arón Canet	Kalex	Qualified in Q2	1:56.593	3	1
4	75	(Spain) Albert Arenas	Kalex	Qualified in Q2	1:56.624	4	2
5	27	(Spain) Daniel Holgado	Kalex	Qualified in Q2	1:56.756	5	2
6	84	(Netherlands) Zonta van den Goorbergh	Kalex	Qualified in Q2	1:56.774	6	2
7	53	(Turkey) Deniz Öncü	Kalex	Qualified in Q2	1:56.778	7	3
8	12	(Czech Republic) Filip Salač	Boscoscuro	Qualified in Q2	1:56.912	8	3
9	7	(Belgium) Barry Baltus	Kalex	Qualified in Q2	1:56.939	9	3
10	24	(Spain) Marcos Ramírez	Kalex	Qualified in Q2	1:57.015	10	4
11	80	(Colombia) David Alonso	Kalex	Qualified in Q2	1:57.044	11	4
12	10	(Brazil) Diogo Moreira	Kalex	1:57.251	1:57.078	12	4
13	81	(Australia) Senna Agius	Kalex	1:57.102	1:57.148	13	5
14	13	(Italy) Celestino Vietti	Boscoscuro	1:57.341	1:57.304	14	5
15	15	(South Africa) Darryn Binder	Kalex	Qualified in Q2	1:57.355	15	5
16	99	(Spain) Adrián Huertas	Kalex	Qualified in Q2	1:57.666	16	6
17	64	(Indonesia) Mario Aji	Kalex	Qualified in Q2	1:57.694	17	6
18	21	(Spain) Alonso López	Boscoscuro	Qualified in Q2	1:57.830	18	6
19	11	(Spain) Álex Escrig	Forward	1:57.433	2:08.931	19	7
20	95	(Netherlands) Collin Veijer	Kalex	1:57.540	N/A	20	7
21	9	(Spain) Jorge Navarro	Forward	1:57.558	N/A	21	7
22	14	(Italy) Tony Arbolino	Boscoscuro	1:57.601	N/A	22	8
23	16	(United States) Joe Roberts	Kalex	1:57.640	N/A	23	8
24	71	(Japan) Ayumu Sasaki	Kalex	1:57.674	N/A	24	8
25	4	(Spain) Iván Ortolá	Boscoscuro	1:57.922	N/A	25	9
26	28	(Spain) Izan Guevara	Boscoscuro	1:58.130	N/A	26	9
27	3	(Spain) Sergio García	Boscoscuro	1:58.185	N/A	27	9
28	92	(Japan) Yuki Kunii	Kalex	1:58.821	N/A	28	10
OFFICIAL MOTO2 PRACTICE TIMES REPORT

=== Moto3 ===
Fastest session lap

Pos.	No.	Biker	Constructor	Qualifying times		Final grid	Row
Pos.	No.	Biker	Constructor	P1	P2	Final grid	Row
1	6	(Japan) Ryusei Yamanaka	KTM	Qualified in Q2	2:02.638	1	1
2	66	(Australia) Joel Kelso	KTM	Qualified in Q2	2:02.679	2	1
3	99	(Spain) José Antonio Rueda	KTM	Qualified in Q2	2:02.914	3	1
4	54	(Italy) Riccardo Rossi	Honda	Qualified in Q2	2:02.938	4	2
5	36	(Spain) Ángel Piqueras	KTM	Qualified in Q2	2:03.000	5	2
6	83	(Spain) Álvaro Carpe	KTM	Qualified in Q2	2:03.109	6	2
7	31	(Spain) Adrián Fernández	Honda	Qualified in Q2	2:03.238	7	3
8	22	(Spain) David Almansa	Honda	2:03.237	2:03.414	8	3
9	94	(Italy) Guido Pini	KTM	Qualified in Q2	2:03.557	9	3
10	10	(Italy) Nicola Carraro	Honda	Qualified in Q2	2:03.622	10	4
11	64	(Spain) David Muñoz	KTM	Qualified in Q2	2:03.795	11	4
12	72	(Japan) Taiyo Furusato	Honda	Qualified in Q2	2:03.906	12	4
13	71	(Italy) Dennis Foggia	KTM	Qualified in Q2	2:03.989	13	5
14	19	(United Kingdom) Scott Ogden	KTM	Qualified in Q2	2:04.062	14	5
15	82	(Italy) Stefano Nepa	Honda	Qualified in Q2	2:04.127	15	5
16	14	(New Zealand) Cormac Buchanan	KTM	Qualified in Q2	2:04.136	16	6
17	58	(Italy) Luca Lunetta	Honda	Qualified in Q2	2:04.547	17	6
18	5	(Thailand) Tatchakorn Buasri	Honda	Qualified in Q2	2:05.735	18	6
19	73	(Argentina) Valentín Perrone	KTM	2:04.517	N/A	19	7
20	21	(South Africa) Ruche Moodley	KTM	2:04.531	N/A	20	7
21	78	(Spain) Joel Esteban	KTM	2:04.549	N/A	21	7
22	12	(Australia) Jacob Roulstone	KTM	2:04.696	N/A	22	8
23	8	(United Kingdom) Eddie O'Shea	Honda	2:04.790	N/A	23	8
24	11	(Switzerland) Noah Dettwiler	KTM	2:05.132	N/A	24	8
QATAR AIRWAYS GRAND PRIX OF QATAR MOTO3 QUALIFYING RESULTS

== MotoGP Sprint ==
The MotoGP Sprint was held on 29 March 2025.

Pos.	No.	Rider	Team	Manufacturer	Laps	Time/Retired	Grid	Points
1	93	(Spain) Marc Márquez	Ducati Lenovo Team	Ducati	11	20:38.304	1	12
2	73	(Spain) Álex Márquez	BK8 Gresini Racing MotoGP	Ducati	11	+1.577	2	9
3	21	(Italy) Franco Morbidelli	Pertamina Enduro VR46 Racing Team	Ducati	11	+3.988	4	7
4	54	(Spain) Fermín Aldeguer	BK8 Gresini Racing MotoGP	Ducati	11	+4.369	8	6
5	20	(France) Fabio Quartararo	Monster Energy Yamaha MotoGP Team	Yamaha	11	+4.593	3	5
6	49	(Italy) Fabio Di Giannantonio	Pertamina Enduro VR46 Racing Team	Ducati	11	+5.099	5	4
7	79	(Japan) Ai Ogura	Trackhouse MotoGP Team	Aprilia	11	+10.199	10	3
8	63	(Italy) Francesco Bagnaia	Ducati Lenovo Team	Ducati	11	+10.334	11	2
9	72	(Italy) Marco Bezzecchi	Aprilia Racing	Aprilia	11	+11.300	13	1
10	12	(Spain) Maverick Viñales	Red Bull KTM Tech3	KTM	11	+12.554	6	
11	37	(Spain) Pedro Acosta	Red Bull KTM Factory Racing	KTM	11	+13.676	12	
12	42	(Spain) Álex Rins	Monster Energy Yamaha MotoGP Team	Yamaha	11	+14.273	9	
13	23	(Italy) Enea Bastianini	Red Bull KTM Tech3	KTM	11	+14.408	20	
14	33	(South Africa) Brad Binder	Red Bull KTM Factory Racing	KTM	11	+15.459	18	
15	10	(Italy) Luca Marini	Honda HRC Castrol	Honda	11	+15.587	14	
16	1	(Spain) Jorge Martín	Aprilia Racing	Aprilia	11	+15.775	14	
17	25	(Spain) Raúl Fernández	Trackhouse MotoGP Team	Aprilia	11	+16.317	17	
18	7	(Spain) Augusto Fernández	Prima Pramac Yamaha MotoGP	Yamaha	11	+17.922	19	
19	43	(Australia) Jack Miller	Prima Pramac Yamaha MotoGP	Yamaha	11	+20.274	16	
20	35	(Thailand) Somkiat Chantra	Idemitsu Honda LCR	Honda	11	+31.106	21	
Ret	5	(France) Johann Zarco	Castrol Honda LCR	Honda	8	Tyres	7	
DNS	36	(Spain) Joan Mir	Honda HRC Castrol	Honda		Rider ill		
Fastest sprint lap: (Spain) Marc Márquez (Ducati) – 1:52.093 (lap 5)
OFFICIAL MOTOGP SPRINT REPORT

== Warm Up ==
=== Warm Up MotoGP ===
Pos.	No.	Biker	Constructor	
Pos.	No.	Biker	Constructor	Time results
1	93	(Spain) Marc Márquez	Ducati	1:52.644
2	12	(Spain) Maverick Viñales	KTM	1:53.182
3	1	(Spain) Jorge Martín	Aprilia	1:53.253
4	37	(Spain) Pedro Acosta	KTM	1:53.284
5	79	(Japan) Ai Ogura	Aprilia	1:53.302
6	63	(Italy) Francesco Bagnaia	Ducati	1:53.313
7	73	(Spain) Álex Márquez	Ducati	1:53.314
8	5	(France) Johann Zarco	Honda	1:53.315
9	49	(Italy) Fabio Di Giannantonio	Ducati	1:53.357
10	54	(Spain) Fermín Aldeguer	Ducati	1:53.401
11	10	(Italy) Luca Marini	Honda	1:53.491
12	72	(Italy) Marco Bezzecchi	Aprilia	1:53.510
13	42	(Spain) Álex Rins	Yamaha	1:53.601
14	23	(Italy) Enea Bastianini	KTM	1:53.656
15	36	(Spain) Joan Mir	Honda	1:53.679
16	20	(France) Fabio Quartararo	Yamaha	1:53.758
17	33	(South Africa) Brad Binder	KTM	1:53.827
18	21	(Italy) Franco Morbidelli	Ducati	1:53.901
19	25	(Spain) Raúl Fernández	Aprilia	1:53.933
20	43	(Australia) Jack Miller	Yamaha	1:54.009
21	7	(Spain) Augusto Fernández	Yamaha	1:54.051
22	35	(Thailand) Somkiat Chantra	Honda	1:55.043
OFFICIAL MOTOGP WARM UP TIMES REPORT

== Race ==
=== MotoGP ===
Pos.	No.	Rider	Team	Constructor	Laps	Time/Retired	Grid	Points
1	93	(Spain) Marc Márquez	Ducati Lenovo Team	Ducati	22	41:29.186	1	25
2	63	(Italy) Francesco Bagnaia	Ducati Lenovo Team	Ducati	22	+4.535	11	20
3	21	(Italy) Franco Morbidelli	Pertamina Enduro VR46 Racing Team	Ducati	22	+6.495	4	16
4	5	(France) Johann Zarco	Castrol Honda LCR	Honda	22	+6.668	7	13
5	54	(Spain) Fermín Aldeguer	BK8 Gresini Racing MotoGP	Ducati	22	+7.484	8	11
6	73	(Spain) Álex Márquez	BK8 Gresini Racing MotoGP	Ducati	22	+9.764	2	10
7	20	(France) Fabio Quartararo	Monster Energy Yamaha MotoGP Team	Yamaha	22	+12.895	3	9
8	37	(Spain) Pedro Acosta	Red Bull KTM Factory Racing	KTM	22	+14.219	12	8
9	72	(Italy) Marco Bezzecchi	Aprilia Racing	Aprilia	22	+14.368	13	7
10	10	(Italy) Luca Marini	Honda HRC Castrol	Honda	22	+15.137	15	6
11	23	(Italy) Enea Bastianini	Red Bull KTM Tech3	KTM	22	+17.459	20	5
12	42	(Spain) Álex Rins	Monster Energy Yamaha MotoGP Team	Yamaha	22	+17.563	9	4
13	33	(South Africa) Brad Binder	Red Bull KTM Factory Racing	KTM	22	+17.632	18	3
14	12	(Spain) Maverick Viñales	Red Bull KTM Tech3	KTM	22	+17.800 (Note: 16-second penalty for illegal tyre pressures.)	6	2
15	79	(Japan) Ai Ogura	Trackhouse MotoGP Team	Aprilia	22	+18.758	10	1
16	49	(Italy) Fabio Di Giannantonio	Pertamina Enduro VR46 Racing Team	Ducati	22	+26.340	5	
17	25	(Spain) Raúl Fernández	Trackhouse MotoGP Team	Aprilia	22	+26.925	17	
18	35	(Thailand) Somkiat Chantra	Idemitsu Honda LCR	Honda	22	+38.186	22	
Ret	1	(Spain) Jorge Martín	Aprilia Racing	Aprilia	13	Accident	14	
Ret	7	(Spain) Augusto Fernández	Prima Pramac Yamaha MotoGP	Yamaha	13	Accident	19	
Ret	36	(Spain) Joan Mir	Honda HRC Castrol	Honda	12	Retired	21	
Ret	43	(Australia) Jack Miller	Prima Pramac Yamaha MotoGP	Yamaha	9	Accident	16	
Fastest lap: (Spain) Marc Márquez (Ducati) - 1:52.561 (lap 19)
OFFICIAL MOTOGP RACE REPORT

=== Moto2 ===
Pos.	No.	Rider	Team	Constructor	Laps	Time/Retired	Grid	Points
1	44	(Spain) Arón Canet	Fantic Racing Lino Sonego	Kalex	18	35:30.185	3	25
2	53	(Turkey) Deniz Öncü	Red Bull KTM Ajo	Kalex	18	+1.103	7	20
3	18	(Spain) Manuel González	Liqui Moly Dynavolt Intact GP	Kalex	18	+1.286	1	16
4	27	(Spain) Daniel Holgado	CFMoto Inde Aspar Team	Kalex	18	+4.021	5	13
5	10	(Brazil) Diogo Moreira	Italtrans Racing Team	Kalex	18	+5.892	12	11
6	7	(Belgium) Barry Baltus	Fantic Racing Lino Sonego	Kalex	18	+6.158	9	10
7	13	(Italy) Celestino Vietti	Team HDR Heidrun	Boscoscuro	18	+9.821	14	9
8	24	(Spain) Marcos Ramírez	OnlyFans American Racing Team	Kalex	18	+9.991	10	8
9	75	(Spain) Albert Arenas	Italjet Gresini Moto2	Kalex	18	+10.839	4	7
10	12	(Czech Republic) Filip Salač	Elf Marc VDS Racing Team	Boscoscuro	18	+10.879	8	6
11	80	(Colombia) David Alonso	CFMoto Inde Aspar Team	Kalex	18	+11.523	11	5
12	84	(Netherlands) Zonta van den Goorbergh	RW-Idrofoglia Racing GP	Kalex	18	+11.925	6	4
13	95	(Netherlands) Collin Veijer	Red Bull KTM Ajo	Kalex	18	+13.048	20	3
14	81	(Australia) Senna Agius	Liqui Moly Dynavolt Intact GP	Kalex	18	+13.963	13	2
15	16	(United States) Joe Roberts	OnlyFans American Racing Team	Kalex	18	+17.642	23	1
16	21	(Spain) Alonso López	Team HDR Heidrun	Boscoscuro	18	+18.368	18	
17	99	(Spain) Adrián Huertas	Italtrans Racing Team	Kalex	18	+18.919	16	
18	4	(Spain) Iván Ortolá	QJMotor – Frinsa – MSi	Boscoscuro	18	+20.138	25	
19	3	(Spain) Sergio García	QJMotor – Frinsa – MSi	Boscoscuro	18	+20.473	27	
20	14	(Italy) Tony Arbolino	Blu Cru Pramac Yamaha Moto2	Boscoscuro	18	+20.430	22	
21	11	(Spain) Álex Escrig	Klint Forward Factory Team	Forward	18	+22.679	19	
22	28	(Spain) Izan Guevara	Blu Cru Pramac Yamaha Moto2	Boscoscuro	18	+24.549	26	
23	64	(Indonesia) Mario Aji	Idemitsu Honda Team Asia	Kalex	18	+25.409	17	
24	92	(Japan) Yuki Kunii	Idemitsu Honda Team Asia	Kalex	18	+29.608	28	
25	9	(Spain) Jorge Navarro	Klint Forward Factory Team	Forward	16	+2 laps	21	
Ret	96	(United Kingdom) Jake Dixon	Elf Marc VDS Racing Team	Boscoscuro	11	Accident	2	
Ret	15	(South Africa) Darryn Binder	Italjet Gresini Moto2	Kalex	4	Technical issue	15	
Ret	71	(Japan) Ayumu Sasaki	RW-Idrofoglia Racing GP	Kalex	2	Accident	24	
Fastest lap: (Belgium) Barry Baltus (Kalex) - 1:57.646 (lap 11)
OFFICIAL MOTO2 RACE REPORT

=== Moto3 ===
Pos.	No.	Rider	Team	Constructor	Laps	Time/Retired	Grid	Points
1	36	(Spain) Ángel Piqueras	Frinsa – MT Helmets – MSi	KTM	16	33:17.268	5	25
2	72	(Japan) Taiyo Furusato	Honda Team Asia	Honda	16	+0.009	12	20
3	6	(Japan) Ryusei Yamanaka	Frinsa – MT Helmets – MSi	KTM	16	+0.042	1	16
4	66	(Australia) Joel Kelso	LevelUp – MTA	KTM	16	+0.097	2	13
5	54	(Italy) Riccardo Rossi	Rivacold Snipers Team	Honda	16	+7.295	4	11
6	64	(Spain) David Muñoz	Liqui Moly Dynavolt Intact GP	KTM	16	+10.309	11	10
7	58	(Italy) Luca Lunetta	Sic58 Squadra Corse	Honda	16	+10.474	17	9
8	82	(Italy) Stefano Nepa	Sic58 Squadra Corse	Honda	15	+10.561	15	8
9	10	(Italy) Nicola Carraro	Rivacold Snipers Team	Honda	16	+12.115	10	7
10	94	(Italy) Guido Pini	Liqui Moly Dynavolt Intact GP	KTM	16	+12.121	9	6
11	83	(Spain) Álvaro Carpe	Red Bull KTM Ajo	KTM	16	+12.165	6	5
12	19	(United Kingdom) Scott Ogden	CIP Green Power	KTM	16	+12.251	14	4
13	21	(South Africa) Ruché Moodley	Denssi Racing – Boé	KTM	16	+12.444	20	3
14	12	(Australia) Jacob Roulstone	Red Bull KTM Tech3	KTM	16	+12.847	22	2
15	73	(Argentina) Valentín Perrone	Red Bull KTM Tech3	KTM	16	+20.102	19	1
16	22	(Spain) David Almansa	Leopard Racing	Honda	16	+24.334	8	
17	55	(Switzerland) Noah Dettwiler	CIP Green Power	KTM	16	+29.130	24	
18	8	(United Kingdom) Eddie O'Shea	Gryd – MLav Racing	Honda	16	+29.158	23	
19	5	(Thailand) Tatchakorn Buasri	Honda Team Asia	Honda	16	+29.352	18	
Ret	99	(Spain) José Antonio Rueda	Red Bull KTM Ajo	KTM	15	Technical issue	3	
Ret	78	(Spain) Joel Esteban	Red Bull KTM Tech3	KTM	12	Accident	21	
Ret	31	(Spain) Adrián Fernández	Leopard Racing	Honda	9	Retired	7	
Ret	14	(New Zealand) Cormac Buchanan	Denssi Racing – Boé	KTM	8	Accident	16	
Ret	71	(Italy) Dennis Foggia	CFMoto Gaviota Aspar Team	KTM	3	Accident	13	
Fastest lap: (Spain) David Muñoz (KTM) - 2:03.743 (lap 8)
OFFICIAL MOTO3 RACE REPORT

== Championship standings after the race ==
Below are the standings for the top five riders, constructors, and teams after the round.

=== MotoGP ===
Riders' Championship standings

	Pos.	Rider	Points
1	1	(Spain) Marc Márquez	123
1	2	(Spain) Álex Márquez	106
	3	(Italy) Francesco Bagnaia	97
	4	(Italy) Franco Morbidelli	78
	5	(Italy) Fabio Di Giannantonio	48

Constructors' Championship standings

	Pos.	Constructor	Points
	1	(Italy) Ducati	148
	2	(Japan) Honda	49
1	3	(Italy) Aprilia	43
1	4	(Austria) KTM	42
	5	(Japan) Yamaha	42

Teams' Championship standings

	Pos.	Team	Points
	1	(Italy) Ducati Lenovo Team	220
1	2	(Italy) BK8 Gresini Racing MotoGP	126
1	3	(Italy) Pertamina Enduro VR46 Racing Team	126
	4	(Austria) Red Bull KTM Factory Racing	46
2	5	(Japan) Monster Energy Yamaha MotoGP Team	44

=== Moto2 ===
Riders' Championship standings

	Pos.	Rider	Points
1	1	(Spain) Arón Canet	71
1	2	(Spain) Manuel González	61
2	3	(United Kingdom) Jake Dixon	59
4	4	(Spain) Daniel Holgado	36
1	5	(Spain) Marcos Ramírez	35

Constructors' Championship standings

	Pos.	Constructor	Points
1	1	(Germany) Kalex	83
1	2	(Italy) Boscoscuro	68
	3	(Switzerland) Forward	10

Teams' Championship standings

	Pos.	Team	Points
	1	(Italy) Fantic Racing Lino Sonego	104
1	2	(Germany) Liqui Moly Dynavolt Intact GP	82
1	3	(Belgium) Elf Marc VDS Racing Team	72
	4	(Italy) Team HDR Heidrun	55
2	5	(Spain) CFMoto Inde Aspar Team	43

=== Moto3 ===
Riders' Championship standings

	Pos.	Rider	Points
1	1	(Spain) Ángel Piqueras	67
1	2	(Spain) José Antonio Rueda	66
3	3	(Australia) Joel Kelso	41
1	4	(Spain) Adrián Fernández	40
1	5	(Italy) Matteo Bertelle	40

Constructors' Championship standings

Pos.	Constructor	Points
1	(Austria) KTM	100
2	(Japan) Honda	63

Teams' Championship standings

	Pos.	Team	Points
	1	(Finland) Red Bull KTM Ajo	101
2	2	(Spain) Frinsa – MT Helmets – MSi	90
1	3	(Italy) LevelUp – MTA	81
1	4	(Luxembourg) Leopard Racing	62
1	5	(Italy) Sic58 Squadra Corse	51

== Notes ==
Previous race: 2025 Grand Prix of the Americas	FIM Grand Prix World Championship; 2025 season	Next race: 2025 Spanish Grand Prix
Previous race: 2024 Qatar Grand Prix	Qatar motorcycle Grand Prix	Next race: 2026 Qatar Grand Prix
