= 2025 Japanese motorcycle Grand Prix =

Motorcycle races in Motegi

(Japan) 2025 Japanese Grand Prix
Race details
- Race 17 of 22 races in the 2025 Grand Prix motorcycle racing season
- Date: 28 September 2025
- Official name: Motul Grand Prix of Japan
- Location: Mobility Resort Motegi; Motegi, Japan
- Course: Permanent racing facility; 4.801 km (2.983 mi)

MotoGP
Pole position
Rider	(Italy) Francesco Bagnaia	Ducati
Time	1:42.911	
Fastest lap
Rider	(Italy) Francesco Bagnaia	Ducati
Time	1:44.412 on lap 2	
Podium
First	(Italy) Francesco Bagnaia	Ducati
Second	(Spain) Marc Márquez	Ducati
Third	(Spain) Joan Mir	Honda

Moto2
Pole position
Rider	(Spain) Manuel González	Kalex
Time	1:47.925	
Fastest lap
Rider	(Spain) Daniel Holgado	Kalex
Time	1:48.739 on lap 2	
Podium
First	(Spain) Daniel Holgado	Kalex
Second	(United Kingdom) Jake Dixon	Boscoscuro
Third	(Brazil) Diogo Moreira	Kalex

Moto3
Pole position
Rider	(Spain) José Antonio Rueda	KTM
Time	1:54.826	
Fastest lap
Rider	(Spain) José Antonio Rueda	KTM
Time	1:55.305 on lap 15	
Podium
First	(Spain) David Muñoz	KTM
Second	(Spain) José Antonio Rueda	KTM
Third	(Spain) Máximo Quiles	KTM

The 2025 Japanese motorcycle Grand Prix (officially known as the Motul Grand Prix of Japan) was the seventeenth round of the 2025 Grand Prix motorcycle racing season. All races were held at the Mobility Resort Motegi in Motegi on 28 September 2025.

In the MotoGP class, Marc Márquez of Ducati Lenovo Team finished second in the main race, clinching his seventh MotoGP World Riders' Championship and his first since 2019.

After Daniel Holgado's win in the Moto2 class, Kalex secured its thirteenth straight Constructors' Championship.

== MotoGP Sprint ==
The MotoGP Sprint was held on 27 September 2025.

Pos.	No.	Rider	Team	Manufacturer	Laps	Time/Retired	Grid	Points
1	63	(Italy) Francesco Bagnaia	Ducati Lenovo Team	Ducati	12	20:59.113	1	12
2	93	(Spain) Marc Márquez	Ducati Lenovo Team	Ducati	12	+1.842	3	9
3	37	(Spain) Pedro Acosta	Red Bull KTM Factory Racing	KTM	12	+3.674	4	7
4	36	(Spain) Joan Mir	Honda HRC Castrol	Honda	12	+4.300	2	6
5	21	(Italy) Franco Morbidelli	Pertamina Enduro VR46 Racing Team	Ducati	12	+5.130	6	5
6	20	(France) Fabio Quartararo	Monster Energy Yamaha MotoGP Team	Yamaha	12	+8.913	5	4
7	10	(Italy) Luca Marini	Honda HRC Castrol	Honda	12	+9.102	7	3
8	25	(Spain) Raúl Fernández	Trackhouse MotoGP Team	Aprilia	12	+10.334	10	2
9	79	(Japan) Ai Ogura	Trackhouse MotoGP Team	Aprilia	12	+10.480	13	1
10	73	(Spain) Álex Márquez	BK8 Gresini Racing MotoGP	Ducati	12	+11.487	8	
11	54	(Spain) Fermín Aldeguer	BK8 Gresini Racing MotoGP	Ducati	12	+13.492	15	
12	33	(South Africa) Brad Binder	Red Bull KTM Factory Racing	KTM	12	+13.823	18	
13	49	(Italy) Fabio Di Giannantonio	Pertamina Enduro VR46 Racing Team	Ducati	12	+15.425	12	
14	30	(Japan) Takaaki Nakagami	Honda HRC Test Team	Honda	12	+16.352	20	
15	88	(Portugal) Miguel Oliveira	Prima Pramac Yamaha MotoGP	Yamaha	12	+18.211	16	
16	12	(Spain) Maverick Viñales	Red Bull KTM Tech3	KTM	12	+20.706	23	
17	35	(Thailand) Somkiat Chantra	IDEMITSU Honda LCR	Honda	12	+21.883	22	
18	42	(Spain) Álex Rins	Monster Energy Yamaha MotoGP Team	Yamaha	12	+43.428	19	
Ret	43	(Australia) Jack Miller	Prima Pramac Yamaha MotoGP	Yamaha	11	Accident	14	
Ret	5	(France) Johann Zarco	LCR Honda Castrol	Honda	9	Retired in pits	11	
Ret	23	(Italy) Enea Bastianini	Red Bull KTM Tech3	KTM	6	Technical issue	21	
Ret	72	(Italy) Marco Bezzecchi	Aprilia Racing	Aprilia	0	Collision	9	
Ret	1	(Spain) Jorge Martín	Aprilia Racing	Aprilia	0	Collision	17	
Fastest sprint lap: (Italy) Francesco Bagnaia (Ducati) – 1:43.721 (lap 3)
OFFICIAL MOTOGP SPRINT REPORT

== Race ==
=== MotoGP ===
Pos.	No.	Rider	Team	Manufacturer	Laps	Time/Retired	Grid	Points
1	63	(Italy) Francesco Bagnaia	Ducati Lenovo Team	Ducati	24	42:09.312	1	25
2	93	(Spain) Marc Márquez	Ducati Lenovo Team	Ducati	24	+4.196	3	20
3	36	(Spain) Joan Mir	Honda HRC Castrol	Honda	24	+6.858	2	16
4	72	(Italy) Marco Bezzecchi	Aprilia Racing	Aprilia	24	+10.128	9	13
5	21	(Italy) Franco Morbidelli	Pertamina Enduro VR46 Racing Team	Ducati	24	+10.421	6	11
6	73	(Spain) Álex Márquez	BK8 Gresini Racing MotoGP	Ducati	24	+14.544	8	10
7	25	(Spain) Raúl Fernández	Trackhouse MotoGP Team	Aprilia	24	+17.588	10	9
8	20	(France) Fabio Quartararo	Monster Energy Yamaha MotoGP Team	Yamaha	24	+21.160	5	8
9	5	(France) Johann Zarco	LCR Honda Castrol	Honda	24	+21.733	11	7
10	54	(Spain) Fermín Aldeguer	BK8 Gresini Racing MotoGP	Ducati	24	+23.107	14	6
11	23	(Italy) Enea Bastianini	Red Bull KTM Tech3	KTM	24	+23.616	19	5
12	33	(South Africa) Brad Binder	Red Bull KTM Factory Racing	KTM	24	+23.882	16	4
13	49	(Italy) Fabio Di Giannantonio	Pertamina Enduro VR46 Racing Team	Ducati	24	+29.359	12	3
14	88	(Portugal) Miguel Oliveira	Prima Pramac Yamaha MotoGP	Yamaha	24	+30.788	15	2
15	35	(Thailand) Somkiat Chantra	IDEMITSU Honda LCR	Honda	24	+30.990	20	1
16	12	(Spain) Maverick Viñales	Red Bull KTM Tech3	KTM	24	+31.712	21	
17	37	(Spain) Pedro Acosta	Red Bull KTM Factory Racing	KTM	24	+34.157	4	
18	42	(Spain) Álex Rins	Monster Energy Yamaha MotoGP Team	Yamaha	24	+34.792	17	
Ret	43	(Australia) Jack Miller	Prima Pramac Yamaha MotoGP	Yamaha	21	Chain	13	
Ret	30	(Japan) Takaaki Nakagami	Honda HRC Test Team	Honda	19	Accident	18	
Ret	10	(Italy) Luca Marini	Honda HRC Castrol	Honda	2	Retired in pits	7	
DNS	79	(Japan) Ai Ogura	Trackhouse MotoGP Team	Aprilia		Injury^{1}	—	
DNS	1	(Spain) Jorge Martín	Aprilia Racing	Aprilia		Injury^{2}	—	
Fastest lap: (Italy) Francesco Bagnaia (Ducati) – 1:44.412 (lap 2)
OFFICIAL MOTOGP RACE REPORT

Notes

- ^1 - Ai Ogura withdrew from the Race due to discomfort in his right hand following a crash in Misano. The riders behind him on the grid each moved up one position.
- ^2 - Jorge Martín withdrew from the Race due after breaking his right collarbone following a crash in the Sprint. The riders behind him on the grid each moved up one position.

== Championship standings after the race ==
Below are the standings for the top five riders, constructors, and teams after the round.

=== MotoGP ===
Riders' Championship standings

	Pos.	Rider	Points
	1	(Spain) Marc Márquez	541
	2	(Spain) Álex Márquez	340
	3	(Italy) Francesco Bagnaia	274
	4	(Italy) Marco Bezzecchi	242
1	5	(Italy) Franco Morbidelli	196

Constructors' Championship standings

Pos.	Constructor	Points
1	(Italy) Ducati	612
2	(Italy) Aprilia	286
3	(Austria) KTM	260
4	(Japan) Honda	220
5	(Japan) Yamaha	180

Teams' Championship standings

Pos.	Team	Points
1	(Italy) Ducati Lenovo Team	815
2	(Italy) BK8 Gresini Racing MotoGP	487
3	(Italy) Pertamina Enduro VR46 Racing Team	378
4	(Austria) Red Bull KTM Factory Racing	300
5	(Italy) Aprilia Racing	284

=== Moto2 ===
Riders' Championship standings

Pos.	Rider	Points
1	(Spain) Manuel González	238
2	(Brazil) Diogo Moreira	204
3	(Spain) Arón Canet	189
4	(Belgium) Barry Baltus	182
5	(United Kingdom) Jake Dixon	172

Constructors' Championship standings

Pos.	Constructor	Points
1	(Germany) Kalex	403
2	(Italy) Boscoscuro	255
3	(Switzerland) Forward	13

Teams' Championship standings

	Pos.	Team	Points
	1	(Italy) Fantic Racing	371
	2	(Germany) Liqui Moly Dynavolt Intact GP	342
	3	(Belgium) Elf Marc VDS Racing Team	254
	4	(Spain) CFMoto Power Electronics Aspar Team	250
1	5	(Italy) Italtrans Racing Team	220

=== Moto3 ===
Riders' Championship standings

Pos.	Rider	Points
1	(Spain) José Antonio Rueda	315
2	(Spain) Ángel Piqueras	222
3	(Spain) Máximo Quiles	204
4	(Spain) David Muñoz	197
5	(Spain) Álvaro Carpe	157

Constructors' Championship standings

Pos.	Constructor	Points
1	(Austria) KTM	425
2	(Japan) Honda	212

Teams' Championship standings

Pos.	Team	Points
1	(Finland) Red Bull KTM Ajo	472
2	(Spain) Frinsa – MT Helmets – MSi	337
3	(Spain) CFMoto Gaviota Aspar Team	294
4	(Germany) Liqui Moly Dynavolt Intact GP	274
5	(Luxembourg) Leopard Racing	230

Previous race: 2025 San Marino Grand Prix	FIM Grand Prix World Championship; 2025 season	Next race: 2025 Indonesian Grand Prix
Previous race: 2024 Japanese Grand Prix	Japanese motorcycle Grand Prix	Next race: 2026 Japanese Grand Prix
