= 2025 Motorcycle Grand Prix of the Americas =

Motorcycle races in Austin

(United States) 2025 Grand Prix of the Americas
Race details
- Race 3 of 22 races in the 2025 Grand Prix motorcycle racing season
- Date: March 30, 2025
- Official name: Red Bull Grand Prix of the Americas
- Location: Circuit of the Americas; Austin, Texas, United States
- Course: Permanent racing facility; 5.513 km (3.426 mi)

MotoGP
Pole position
Rider	(Spain) Marc Márquez	Ducati
Time	2:01.088	
Fastest lap
Rider	(Spain) Marc Márquez	Ducati
Time	2:02.221 on lap 7	
Podium
First	(Italy) Francesco Bagnaia	Ducati
Second	(Spain) Álex Márquez	Ducati
Third	(Italy) Fabio Di Giannantonio	Ducati

Moto2
Pole position
Rider	(United Kingdom) Jake Dixon	Boscoscuro
Time	2:07.432	
Fastest lap
Rider	(Spain) Manuel González	Kalex
Time	2:15.397 on lap 15	
Podium
First	(United Kingdom) Jake Dixon	Boscoscuro
Second	(Italy) Tony Arbolino	Boscoscuro
Third	(Spain) Alonso López	Boscoscuro

Moto3
Pole position
Rider	(Spain) David Muñoz	KTM
Time	2:14.422	
Fastest lap
Rider	(Italy) Matteo Bertelle	KTM
Time	2:13.939 on lap 6	
Podium
First	(Spain) José Antonio Rueda	KTM
Second	(Australia) Joel Kelso	KTM
Third	(Italy) Matteo Bertelle	KTM

The 2025 Motorcycle Grand Prix of the Americas (officially known as the Red Bull Grand Prix of the Americas) was the third round of the 2025 Grand Prix motorcycle racing season. All races were held at the Circuit of the Americas in Austin, Texas on March 30, 2025.

== Background ==
Reigning World Champion and factory Aprilia rider Jorge Martín will miss this round due to a wrist injury, and will be replaced by Aprilia test rider Lorenzo Savadori.

== Practice session ==
=== MotoGP ===
==== Combined Free Practice 1-2 ====
Practice times (written in bold) are the fastest times in the session.

Fastest session lap

Pos.	No.	Biker	Constructor	Practice times	
Pos.	No.	Biker	Constructor	P1	P2
1	93	(Spain) Marc Márquez	Ducati	2:12.780	2:02.113
2	73	(Spain) Álex Márquez	Ducati	2:13.314	2:02.553
3	12	(Spain) Maverick Viñales	KTM	2:13.483	2:02.656
4	36	(Spain) Joan Mir	Honda	2:14.257	2:02.690
5	63	(Italy) Francesco Bagnaia	Ducati	2:13.290	2:02.860
6	10	(Italy) Luca Marini	Honda	2:14.277	2:02.888
7	20	(France) Fabio Quartararo	Yamaha	2:14.531	2:02.945
8	49	(Italy) Fabio Di Giannantonio	Ducati	2:14.922	2:02.965
9	21	(Italy) Franco Morbidelli	Ducati	2:12.531	2:02.988
10	37	(Spain) Pedro Acosta	KTM	2:13.275	2:03.147
11	72	(Italy) Marco Bezzecchi	Aprilia	2:15.682	2:03.200
12	54	(Spain) Fermín Aldeguer	Ducati	2:14.528	2:03.208
13	43	(Australia) Jack Miller	Yamaha	2:12.614	2:03.446
14	5	(France) Johann Zarco	Honda	2:12.838	2:03.463
15	25	(Spain) Raúl Fernández	Aprilia	2:15.445	2:03.562
16	23	(Italy) Enea Bastianini	KTM	2:14.739	2:03.650
17	79	(Japan) Ai Ogura	Aprilia	2:21.433	2:03.679
18	33	(South Africa) Brad Binder	KTM	2:13.638	2:03.713
19	42	(Spain) Álex Rins	Yamaha	2:15.480	2:04.153
20	7	(Spain) Augusto Fernández	Yamaha	2:14.148	2:04.989
21	35	(Thailand) Somkiat Chantra	Honda	2:15.959	2:05.392
22	32	(Italy) Lorenzo Savadori	Aprilia	2:19.703	2:05.917
OFFICIAL MOTOGP COMBINED PRACTICE TIMES REPORT

==== Practice ====
The top 10 riders (written in bold) qualified for Q2.

Fastest session lap

Pos.	No.	Biker	Constructor	
Pos.	No.	Biker	Constructor	Time results
1	93	**(Spain) Marc Márquez**	**Ducati**	**2:02.929**
2	49	**(Italy) Fabio Di Giannantonio**	**Ducati**	**2:03.665**
3	21	**(Italy) Franco Morbidelli**	**Ducati**	**2:03.766**
4	73	**(Spain) Álex Márquez**	**Ducati**	**2:03.811**
5	54	**(Spain) Fermín Aldeguer**	**Ducati**	**2:03.902**
6	43	**(Australia) Jack Miller**	**Yamaha**	**2:03.953**
7	37	**(Spain) Pedro Acosta**	**KTM**	**2:04.099**
8	12	**(Spain) Maverick Viñales**	**KTM**	**2:04.261**
9	36	**(Spain) Joan Mir**	**Honda**	**2:04.342**
10	63	**(Italy) Francesco Bagnaia**	**Ducati**	**2:04.459**
11	20	(France) Fabio Quartararo	Yamaha	2:04.579
12	33	(South Africa) Brad Binder	KTM	2:04.761
13	72	(Italy) Marco Bezzecchi	Aprilia	2:04.770
14	79	(Japan) Ai Ogura	Aprilia	2:04.931
15	10	(Italy) Luca Marini	Honda	2:04.964
16	25	(Spain) Raúl Fernández	Aprilia	2:05.113
17	42	(Spain) Álex Rins	Yamaha	2:05.287
18	23	(Italy) Enea Bastianini	KTM	2:05.335
19	7	(Spain) Augusto Fernández	Yamaha	2:05.927
20	5	(France) Johann Zarco	Honda	2:05.981
21	35	(Thailand) Somkiat Chantra	Honda	2:06.493
22	32	(Italy) Lorenzo Savadori	Aprilia	2:06.922
OFFICIAL MOTOGP PRACTICE TIMES REPORT

=== Moto2 ===
==== Combined Practice 1-2 ====
The top 14 riders (written in bold) qualified for Q2.

Fastest session lap

Pos.	No.	Biker	Constructor	Practice times	
Pos.	No.	Biker	Constructor	P1	P2
1	96	**(United Kingdom) Jake Dixon**	**Boscoscuro**	**2:19.359**	**2:08.216**
2	12	**(Czech Republic) Filip Salač**	**Boscoscuro**	2:20.530	2:08.545
3	44	**(Spain) Arón Canet**	**Kalex**	2:20.730	2:08.588
4	18	**(Spain) Manuel González**	**Kalex**	2:25.279	2:08.696
5	14	**(Italy) Tony Arbolino**	**Boscoscuro**	2:20.645	2:08.762
6	75	**(Spain) Albert Arenas**	**Kalex**	2:23.547	2:09.011
7	53	**(Turkey) Deniz Öncü**	**Kalex**	2:20.566	2:09.143
8	7	**(Belgium) Barry Baltus**	**Kalex**	2:21.002	2:09.294
9	11	**(Spain) Álex Escrig**	**Forward**	2:21.002	2:09.294
10	21	**(Spain) Alonso López**	**Boscoscuro**	2:20.635	2:09.380
11	9	**(Spain) Jorge Navarro**	**Forward**	2:21.846	2:09.533
12	13	**(Italy) Celestino Vietti**	**Boscoscuro**	2:20.604	2:09.637
13	24	**(Spain) Marcos Ramírez**	**Kalex**	2:22.855	2:09.698
14	80	**(Colombia) David Alonso**	**Kalex**	2:22.631	2:09.707
15	10	(Brazil) Diogo Moreira	Kalex	2:23.090	2:09.726
16	28	(Spain) Izan Guevara	Boscoscuro	2:21.752	2:09.764
17	16	(United States) Joe Roberts	Kalex	2:20.530	2:10.021
18	84	(Netherlands) Zonta van den Goorbergh	Kalex	2:23.506	2:10.163
19	4	(Spain) Iván Ortolá	Boscoscuro	2:21.513	2:10.226
20	64	(Indonesia) Mario Aji	Kalex	2:22.161	2:10.251
21	15	(South Africa) Darryn Binder	Kalex	2:22.508	2:10.268
22	71	(Japan) Ayumu Sasaki	Kalex	2:23.796	2:10.360
23	81	(Australia) Senna Agius	Kalex	2:21.976	2:10.520
24	95	(Netherlands) Collin Veijer	Kalex	2:23.157	2:10.657
25	66	(Spain) Óscar Gutiérrez	Boscoscuro	2:25.281	2:10.835
26	99	(Spain) Adrián Huertas	Kalex	2:24.390	2:10.866
27	27	(Spain) Daniel Holgado	Kalex	2:22.897	2:11.038
28	92	(Japan) Yuki Kunii	Kalex	2:21.830	2:11.317
OFFICIAL MOTO2 FREE PRACTICE TIMES REPORT

==== Practice ====
Pos.	No.	Biker	Constructor	Time results
Pos.	No.	Biker	Constructor	P1
1	96	(United Kingdom) Jake Dixon	Boscoscuro	2:18.501
2	14	(Italy) Tony Arbolino	Boscoscuro	2:19.102
3	21	(Spain) Alonso López	Boscoscuro	2:19.415
4	27	(Spain) Daniel Holgado	Kalex	2:19.929
5	13	(Italy) Celestino Vietti	Boscoscuro	2:20.030
6	11	(Spain) Álex Escrig	Forward	2:20.211
7	7	(Belgium) Barry Baltus	Kalex	2:20.236
8	24	(Spain) Marcos Ramírez	Kalex	2:20.403
9	66	(Spain) Óscar Gutiérrez	Boscoscuro	2:20.610
10	92	(Japan) Yuki Kunii	Kalex	2:20.612
11	44	(Spain) Arón Canet	Kalex	2:20.652
12	84	(Netherlands) Zonta van den Goorbergh	Kalex	2:20.683
13	81	(Australia) Senna Agius	Kalex	2:20.686
14	64	(Indonesia) Mario Aji	Kalex	2:20.738
15	4	(Spain) Iván Ortolá	Boscoscuro	2:20.951
16	53	(Turkey) Deniz Öncü	Kalex	2:21.091
17	9	(Spain) Jorge Navarro	Forward	2:21.440
18	71	(Japan) Ayumu Sasaki	Kalex	2:21.611
19	28	(Spain) Izan Guevara	Boscoscuro	2:21.646
20	10	(Brazil) Diogo Moreira	Kalex	2:21.668
21	95	(Netherlands) Collin Veijer	Kalex	2:21.679
22	15	(South Africa) Darryn Binder	Kalex	2:21.799
23	16	(United States) Joe Roberts	Kalex	2:21.922
24	75	(Spain) Albert Arenas	Kalex	2:21.940
25	80	(Colombia) David Alonso	Kalex	2:22.159
26	18	(Spain) Manuel González	Kalex	2:22.485
27	99	(Spain) Adrián Huertas	Kalex	2:22.511
28	12	(Czech Republic) Filip Salač	Boscoscuro	2:22.588

=== Moto3 ===
==== Combined Practice 1-2 ====
Fastest session lap

Pos.	No.	Biker	Constructor	Practice times	
Pos.	No.	Biker	Constructor	P1	P2
1	18	(Italy) Matteo Bertelle	KTM	2:24.169	2:15.695
2	36	(Spain) Ángel Piqueras	KTM	2:23.298	2:15.976
3	66	(Australia) Joel Kelso	KTM	2:25.597	2:16.218
4	31	(Spain) Adrián Fernández	Honda	2:25.250	2:16.293
5	19	(United Kingdom) Scott Ogden	KTM	2:25.195	2:16.374
6	99	(Spain) José Antonio Rueda	KTM	2:24.107	2:16.411
7	83	(Spain) Álvaro Carpe	KTM	2:25.810	2:16.504
8	28	(Spain) Máximo Quiles	KTM	2:25.742	2:16.602
9	73	(Argentina) Valentín Perrone	KTM	2:27.620	2:16.666
10	58	(Italy) Luca Lunetta	Honda	2:25.699	2:16.839
11	71	(Italy) Dennis Foggia	KTM	2:27.518	2:16.895
12	94	(Italy) Guido Pini	KTM	2:24.690	2:17.069
13	8	(United Kingdom) Eddie O'Shea	Honda	2:27.935	2:17.211
14	10	(Italy) Nicola Carraro	Honda	2:27.043	2:17.300
15	54	(Italy) Riccardo Rossi	Honda	2:26.325	2:17.344
16	64	(Spain) David Muñoz	KTM	2:25.031	2:17.389
17	12	(Australia) Jacob Roulstone	KTM	2:30.173	2:17.597
18	14	(New Zealand) Cormac Buchanan	KTM	2:25.780	2:17.605
19	6	(Japan) Ryusei Yamanaka	KTM	2:26.278	2:17.615
20	82	(Italy) Stefano Nepa	Honda	2:27.391	2:17.642
21	21	(South Africa) Ruche Moodley	KTM	2:29.051	2:18.017
22	11	(Spain) Adrián Cruces	KTM	2:25.648	2:18.151
23	5	(Thailand) Tatchakorn Buasri	Honda	2:27.175	2:18.381
24	22	(Spain) David Almansa	Honda	2:24.521	2:18.488
25	34	(Austria) Jakob Rosenthaler	Honda	2:26.685	2:20.306
26	72	(Japan) Taiyo Furusato	Honda	2:26.688	2:24.867
OFFICIAL MOTO3 FREE PRACTICE TIMES REPORT

==== Practice ====
The top 14 riders (written in bold) qualified for Q2.

Pos.	No.	Biker	Constructor	Practice times
Pos.	No.	Biker	Constructor	P1
1	18	(Italy) **Matteo Bertelle**	**KTM**	**2:23.704**
2	28	(Spain) **Máximo Quiles**	**KTM**	**2:24.181**
3	19	(United Kingdom) **Scott Ogden**	**KTM**	**2:24.369**
4	22	(Spain) **David Almansa**	**Honda**	**2:24.442**
5	64	(Spain) **David Muñoz**	**KTM**	**2:24.532**
6	99	(Spain) **José Antonio Rueda**	**KTM**	**2:24.689**
7	31	(Spain) **Adrián Fernández**	**Honda**	**2:24.745**
8	83	(Spain) **Álvaro Carpe**	**KTM**	**2:24.806**
9	54	(Italy) **Riccardo Rossi**	**Honda**	**2:24.826**
10	36	(Spain) **Ángel Piqueras**	**KTM**	**2:24.936**
11	14	(New Zealand) **Cormac Buchanan**	**KTM**	**2:25.055**
12	11	(Spain) **Adrián Cruces**	**KTM**	**2:25.134**
13	58	(Italy) **Luca Lunetta**	**Honda**	**2:25.363**
14	72	(Japan) **Taiyo Furusato**	**Honda**	**2:25.506**
15	6	(Japan) Ryusei Yamanaka	KTM	2:25.576
16	82	(Italy) Stefano Nepa	Honda	2:25.927
17	5	(Thailand) Tatchakorn Buasri	Honda	2:26.006
18	94	(Italy) Guido Pini	KTM	2:26.134
19	66	(Australia) Joel Kelso	KTM	2:26.299
20	10	(Italy) Nicola Carraro	Honda	2:26.480
21	8	(United Kingdom) Eddie O'Shea	Honda	2:26.545
22	34	(Austria) Jakob Rosenthaler	Honda	2:26.841
23	73	(Argentina) Valentín Perrone	KTM	2:27.045
24	12	(Australia) Jacob Roulstone	KTM	2:27.725
25	71	(Italy) Dennis Foggia	KTM	2:28.046
26	21	(South Africa) Ruche Moodley	KTM	2:28.560
OFFICIAL MOTO3 PRACTICE TIMES REPORT

== Qualifying ==
=== MotoGP ===
Fastest session lap

Pos.	No.	Biker	Constructor	Qualifying times		Final grid	Row
Pos.	No.	Biker	Constructor	Q1	Q2	Final grid	Row
1	93	(Spain) Marc Márquez	Ducati	Qualified in Q2	2:01.088	1	1
2	49	(Italy) Fabio Di Giannantonio	Ducati	Qualified in Q2	2:01.189	2	1
3	73	(Spain) Álex Márquez	Ducati	Qualified in Q2	2:01.448	3	1
4	37	(Spain) Pedro Acosta	KTM	Qualified in Q2	2:01.504	4	2
5	21	(Italy) Franco Morbidelli	Ducati	Qualified in Q2	2:01.529	5	2
6	63	(Italy) Francesco Bagnaia	Ducati	Qualified in Q2	2:01.611	6	2
7	10	(Italy) Luca Marini	Honda	2:02.001	2:01.737	7	3
8	36	(Spain) Joan Mir	Honda	Qualified in Q2	2:02.008	8	3
9	43	(Australia) Jack Miller	Yamaha	Qualified in Q2	2:02.008	9	3
10	12	(Spain) Maverick Viñales	KTM	Qualified in Q2	2:02.019	10	4
11	20	(France) Fabio Quartararo	Yamaha	2:02.113	2:02.032	11	4
12	54	(Spain) Fermín Aldeguer	Ducati	Qualified in Q2	2:02.419	12	4
13	72	(Italy) Marco Bezzecchi	Aprilia	2:02.195	N/A	13	5
14	42	(Spain) Álex Rins	Yamaha	2:02.500	N/A	14	5
15	5	(France) Johann Zarco	Honda	2:02.636	N/A	15	5
16	33	(South Africa) Brad Binder	KTM	2:02.637	N/A	16	6
17	23	(Italy) Enea Bastianini	KTM	2:02.868	N/A	17	6
18	79	(Japan) Ai Ogura	Aprilia	2:02.909	N/A	18	6
19	25	(Spain) Raúl Fernández	Aprilia	2:02.957	N/A	19	7
20	7	(Spain) Augusto Fernández	Yamaha	2:03.805	N/A	20	7
21	35	(Thailand) Somkiat Chantra	Honda	2:03.909	N/A	21	7
22	32	(Italy) Lorenzo Savadori	Aprilia	2:04.254	N/A	22	8
RED BULL GRAND PRIX OF THE AMERICAS MOTOGP QUALIFYING RESULTS

=== Moto2 ===
Fastest session lap

Pos.	No.	Biker	Constructor	Qualifying times		Final grid	Row
Pos.	No.	Biker	Constructor	P1	P2	Final grid	Row
1	96	(United Kingdom) Jake Dixon	Boscoscuro	Qualified in Q2	2:07.432	1	1
2	18	(Spain) Manuel González	Kalex	2:07.355	2:07.682	2	1
3	7	(Belgium) Barry Baltus	Kalex	Qualified in Q2	2:07.727	3	1
4	84	(Netherlands) Zonta van den Goorbergh	Kalex	Qualified in Q2	2:07.790	4	2
5	44	(Spain) Arón Canet	Kalex	Qualified in Q2	2:07.806	5	2
6	80	(Colombia) David Alonso	Kalex	2:08.194	2:07.883	6	2
7	14	(Italy) Tony Arbolino	Boscoscuro	Qualified in Q2	2:07.903	7	3
8	24	(Spain) Marcos Ramírez	Kalex	Qualified in Q2	2:07.943	8	3
9	12	(Czech Republic) Filip Salač	Boscoscuro	2:08.224	2:08.058	9	3
10	53	(Turkey) Deniz Öncü	Kalex	2:08.292	2:08.058	10	4
11	21	(Spain) Alonso López	Boscoscuro	Qualified in Q2	2:08.255	11	4
12	64	(Indonesia) Mario Aji	Kalex	Qualified in Q2	2:08.386	12	4
13	27	(Spain) Daniel Holgado	Kalex	Qualified in Q2	2:08.416	13	5
14	11	(Spain) Álex Escrig	Forward	Qualified in Q2	2:08.931	14	5
15	81	(Australia) Senna Agius	Kalex	Qualified in Q2	2:08.974	15	5
16	66	(Spain) Óscar Gutiérrez	Boscoscuro	Qualified in Q2	2:09.253	16	6
17	92	(Japan) Yuki Kunii	Kalex	Qualified in Q2	2:09.500	17	6
18	13	(Italy) Celestino Vietti	Boscoscuro	Qualified in Q2	2:10.233	18	6
19	16	(United States) Joe Roberts	Kalex	2:08.421	N/A	19	7
20	75	(Spain) Albert Arenas	Kalex	2:08.439	N/A	20	7
21	10	(Brazil) Diogo Moreira	Kalex	2:08.453	N/A	21	7
22	9	(Spain) Jorge Navarro	Forward	2:08.642	N/A	22	8
23	4	(Spain) Iván Ortolá	Boscoscuro	2:08.892	N/A	23	8
24	71	(Japan) Ayumu Sasaki	Kalex	2:08.894	N/A	24	8
25	95	(Netherlands) Collin Veijer	Kalex	2:09.254	N/A	25	9
26	28	(Spain) Izan Guevara	Boscoscuro	2:09.280	N/A	26	9
27	15	(South Africa) Darryn Binder	Kalex	2:09.370	N/A		9
28	99	(Spain) Adrián Huertas	Kalex	2:09.537	N/A	27	9
OFFICIAL MOTO2 PRACTICE TIMES REPORT

=== Moto3 ===
Fastest session lap

Pos.	No.	Biker	Constructor	Qualifying times		Final grid	Row
Pos.	No.	Biker	Constructor	P1	P2	Final grid	Row
1	64	(Spain) David Muñoz	KTM	Qualified in Q2	2:14.422	1	1
2	28	(Spain) Máximo Quiles	KTM	Qualified in Q2	2:14.532	2	1
3	66	(Australia) Joel Kelso	KTM	2:14.667	2:14.546	3	1
4	99	(Spain) José Antonio Rueda	KTM	Qualified in Q2	2:14.588	4	2
5	71	(Italy) Dennis Foggia	KTM	2:15.041	2:14.738	5	2
6	58	(Italy) Luca Lunetta	Honda	Qualified in Q2	2:25.363	6	2
7	83	(Spain) Álvaro Carpe	KTM	Qualified in Q2	2:14.838	7	3
8	82	(Italy) Stefano Nepa	Honda	2:15.117	2:14.861	8	3
9	31	(Spain) Adrián Fernández	Honda	Qualified in Q2	2:14.979	9	3
10	18	(Italy) Matteo Bertelle	KTM	Qualified in Q2	2:15.245	10	4
11	36	(Spain) Ángel Piqueras	KTM	Qualified in Q2	2:15.293	11	4
12	94	(Italy) Guido Pini	KTM	2:15.011	2:15.301	12	4
13	19	(United Kingdom) Scott Ogden	KTM	Qualified in Q2	2:15.607	13	5
14	54	(Italy) Riccardo Rossi	Honda	Qualified in Q2	2:15.799	14	5
15	14	(New Zealand) Cormac Buchanan	KTM	Qualified in Q2	2:16.100	15	5
16	11	(Spain) Adrián Cruces	KTM	Qualified in Q2	2:16.536	16	6
17	72	(Japan) Taiyo Furusato	Honda	Qualified in Q2	2:17.744	17	6
18	22	(Spain) David Almansa	Honda	Qualified in Q2	2:24.442	18	6
19	6	(Japan) Ryusei Yamanaka	KTM	2:15.249	N/A	19	7
20	10	(Italy) Nicola Carraro	Honda	2:15.415	N/A	20	7
21	73	(Argentina) Valentín Perrone	KTM	2:15.591	N/A	21	7
22	21	(South Africa) Ruche Moodley	KTM	2:15.670	N/A	22	8
23	12	(Australia) Jacob Roulstone	KTM	2:15.748	N/A	23	8
24	5	(Thailand) Tatchakorn Buasri	Honda	2:15.758	N/A		8
25	8	(United Kingdom) Eddie O'Shea	Honda	2:16.247	N/A	24	8
26	34	(Austria) Jakob Rosenthaler	Honda	2:18.675	N/A	25	9
RED BULL GRAND PRIX OF THE AMERICAS MOTO3 QUALIFYING RESULTS

== MotoGP Sprint ==
The MotoGP Sprint was held on 29 March 2025.

Pos.	No.	Rider	Team	Manufacturer	Laps	Time/Retired	Grid	Points
1	93	(Spain) Marc Márquez	Ducati Lenovo Team	Ducati	10	20:59.509	1	12
2	73	(Spain) Álex Márquez	BK8 Gresini Racing MotoGP	Ducati	10	+0.795	3	9
3	63	(Italy) Francesco Bagnaia	Ducati Lenovo Team	Ducati	10	+1.918	6	7
4	49	(Italy) Fabio Di Giannantonio	Pertamina Enduro VR46 Racing Team	Ducati	10	+8.536	2	6
5	21	(Italy) Franco Morbidelli	Pertamina Enduro VR46 Racing Team	Ducati	10	+9.685	5	5
6	20	(France) Fabio Quartararo	Monster Energy Yamaha MotoGP Team	Yamaha	10	+10.676	11	4
7	37	(Spain) Pedro Acosta	Red Bull KTM Factory Racing	KTM	10	+12.049	4	3
8	10	(Italy) Luca Marini	Honda HRC Castrol	Honda	10	+13.588	7	2
9	79	(Japan) Ai Ogura	Trackhouse MotoGP Team	Aprilia	10	+13.752	18	1
10	72	(Italy) Marco Bezzecchi	Aprilia Racing	Aprilia	10	+14.584	13	
11	54	(Spain) Fermín Aldeguer	BK8 Gresini Racing MotoGP	Ducati	10	+14.754	12	
12	33	(South Africa) Brad Binder	Red Bull KTM Factory Racing	KTM	10	+14.908	16	
13	23	(Italy) Enea Bastianini	Red Bull KTM Tech3	KTM	10	+16.009	17	
14	43	(Australia) Jack Miller	Prima Pramac Yamaha MotoGP	Yamaha	10	+16.182	9	
15	42	(Spain) Álex Rins	Monster Energy Yamaha MotoGP Team	Yamaha	10	+18.181	14	
16	5	(France) Johann Zarco	Castrol Honda LCR	Honda	10	+18.625	15	
17	25	(Spain) Raúl Fernández	Trackhouse MotoGP Team	Aprilia	10	+21.666	19	
18	7	(Spain) Augusto Fernández	Prima Pramac Yamaha MotoGP	Yamaha	10	+29.061	20	
19	35	(Thailand) Somkiat Chantra	IDEMITSU Honda LCR	Honda	10	+33.622	21	
20	32	(Italy) Lorenzo Savadori	Aprilia Racing	Aprilia	10	+37.989	22	
Ret	12	(Spain) Maverick Viñales	Red Bull KTM Tech3	KTM	7	Technical	10	
Ret	36	(Spain) Joan Mir	Honda HRC Castrol	Honda	5	Accident	8	
Fastest sprint lap: (Spain) Marc Márquez (Ducati) – 2:02.129 (lap 2)
OFFICIAL MOTOGP SPRINT REPORT

== Warm Up ==
=== Warm Up MotoGP ===
Pos.	No.	Biker	Constructor	
Pos.	No.	Biker	Constructor	Time results
1	93	(Spain) Marc Márquez	Ducati	2:01.873
2	63	(Italy) Francesco Bagnaia	Ducati	2:02.302
3	5	(France) Johann Zarco	Honda	2:02.568
4	20	(France) Fabio Quartararo	Yamaha	2:02.606
5	49	(Italy) Fabio Di Giannantonio	Ducati	2:02.659
6	12	(Spain) Maverick Viñales	KTM	2:02.742
7	73	(Spain) Álex Márquez	Ducati	2:02.746
8	43	(Australia) Jack Miller	Yamaha	2:02.826
9	37	(Spain) Pedro Acosta	KTM	2:02.837
10	21	(Italy) Franco Morbidelli	Ducati	2:03.056
11	33	(South Africa) Brad Binder	KTM	2:03.219
12	10	(Italy) Luca Marini	Honda	2:03.266
13	23	(Italy) Enea Bastianini	KTM	2:03.292
14	42	(Spain) Álex Rins	Yamaha	2:03.379
15	72	(Italy) Marco Bezzecchi	Aprilia	2:03.407
16	36	(Spain) Joan Mir	Honda	2:03.418
17	54	(Spain) Fermín Aldeguer	Ducati	2:03.437
18	25	(Spain) Raúl Fernández	Aprilia	2:03.477
19	79	(Japan) Ai Ogura	Aprilia	2:03.730
20	7	(Spain) Augusto Fernández	Yamaha	2:04.783
21	35	(Thailand) Somkiat Chantra	Honda	2:05.368
22	32	(Italy) Lorenzo Savadori	Aprilia	2:06.163
OFFICIAL MOTOGP WARM UP TIMES REPORT

== Race ==
=== MotoGP ===
Pos.	No.	Rider	Team	Manufacturer	Laps	Time/Retired	Grid	Points
1	63	(Italy) Francesco Bagnaia	Ducati Lenovo Team	Ducati	19	41:25.401	6	25
2	73	(Spain) Álex Márquez	BK8 Gresini Racing MotoGP	Ducati	19	+2.089	3	20
3	49	(Italy) Fabio Di Giannantonio	Pertamina Enduro VR46 Racing Team	Ducati	19	+3.594	2	16
4	21	(Italy) Franco Morbidelli	Pertamina Enduro VR46 Racing Team	Ducati	19	+10.732	5	13
5	43	(Australia) Jack Miller	Prima Pramac Yamaha MotoGP	Yamaha	19	+11.857	9	11
6	72	(Italy) Marco Bezzecchi	Aprilia Racing	Aprilia	19	+12.238	13	10
7	23	(Italy) Enea Bastianini	Red Bull KTM Tech3	KTM	19	+12.815	17	9
8	10	(Italy) Luca Marini	Honda HRC Castrol	Honda	19	+15.646	7	8
9	79	(Japan) Ai Ogura	Trackhouse MotoGP Team	Aprilia	19	+16.344	18	7
10	20	(France) Fabio Quartararo	Monster Energy Yamaha MotoGP Team	Yamaha	19	+18.255	11	6
11	42	(Spain) Álex Rins	Monster Energy Yamaha MotoGP Team	Yamaha	19	+24.256	14	5
12	25	(Spain) Raúl Fernández	Trackhouse MotoGP Team	Aprilia	19	+27.938	19	4
13	7	(Spain) Augusto Fernández	Prima Pramac Yamaha MotoGP	Yamaha	19	+35.740	20	3
14	12	(Spain) Maverick Viñales	Red Bull KTM Tech3	KTM	19	+42.724	10	2
15	32	(Italy) Lorenzo Savadori	Aprilia Racing	Aprilia	19	+46.397	22	1
16	35	(Thailand) Somkiat Chantra	IDEMITSU Honda LCR	Honda	19	+1:03.601	21	
17	5	(France) Johann Zarco	Castrol Honda LCR	Honda	17	+2 Laps	15	
Ret	54	(Spain) Fermín Aldeguer	BK8 Gresini Racing MotoGP	Ducati	16	Crashed out	12	
Ret	33	(South Africa) Brad Binder	Red Bull KTM Factory Racing	KTM	12	Technical	16	
Ret	93	(Spain) Marc Marquez	Ducati Lenovo Team	Ducati	12	Retired after crash	1	
Ret	36	(Spain) Joan Mir	Honda HRC Castrol	Honda	11	Retired after crash	8	
Ret	37	(Spain) Pedro Acosta	Red Bull KTM Factory Racing	KTM	10	Retired after crash	4	
Fastest lap: (Spain) Marc Márquez (Ducati) – 2:02.221 (lap 7)
OFFICIAL MOTOGP RACE REPORT

=== Moto2 ===
Pos.	No.	Rider	Team	Manufacturer	Laps	Time/Retired	Grid	Points
1	96	(United Kingdom) Jake Dixon	ELF Marc VDS Racing Team	Boscoscuro	16	37:24.220	1	25
2	14	(Italy) Tony Arbolino	BLU CRU Pramac Yamaha Moto2	Boscoscuro	16	+4.148	7	20
3	21	(Spain) Alonso López	Team HDR Heidrun	Boscoscuro	16	+12.685	11	16
4	44	(Spain) Arón Canet	Fantic Racing LINO SONEGO	Kalex	16	+28.375	5	13
5	28	(Spain) Izan Guevara	BLU CRU Pramac Yamaha Moto2	Boscoscuro	16	+30.290	26	11
6	4	(Spain) Iván Ortolá	QJMOTOR - FRINSA - MSI	Boscoscuro	16	+31.916	23	10
7	7	(Belgium) Barry Baltus	Fantic Racing LINO SONEGO	Kalex	16	+32.640	3	9
8	27	(Spain) Daniel Holgado	CFMOTO Power Electronics Aspar Team	Kalex	16	+32.685	13	8
9	64	(Indonesia) Mario Aji	Idemitsu Honda Team Asia	Kalex	16	+33.466	12	7
10	95	(Netherlands) Collin Veijer	Red Bull KTM Ajo	Kalex	16	+35.429	25	6
11	24	(Spain) Marcos Ramírez	OnlyFans American Racing Team	Kalex	16	+36.724	8	5
12	66	(Spain) Oscar Gutierrez	QJMOTOR - FRINSA - MSI	Boscoscuro	16	+39.976	16	4
13	84	(Netherlands) Zonta van den Goorbergh	RW-Idrofoglia Racing GP	Kalex	16	+43.089	4	3
14	80	(Colombia) David Alonso	CFMOTO Power Electronics Aspar Team	Kalex	16	+43.139	6	2
15	11	(Spain) Álex Escrig	KLINT Forward Factory Team	Forward	16	+44.390	14	1
16	99	(Spain) Adrián Huertas	Italtrans Racing Team	Kalex	16	+53.346	28	
17	92	(Japan) Yuki Kunii	Idemitsu Honda Team Asia	Kalex	16	+55.195	17	
18	9	(Spain) Jorge Navarro	KLINT Forward Factory Team	Forward	16	+1:01.164	22	
19	71	(Japan) Ayumu Sasaki	RW - Idrofoglia Racing GP	Kalex	16	+1:12.118	24	
20	13	(Italy) Celestino Vietti	Team HDR Heidrun	Boscoscuro	16	+2:01.393	18	
21	10	(Brazil) Diogo Moreira	Italtrans Racing Team	Kalex	15	+1 Lap	21	
22	18	(Spain) Manuel González	LIQUI MOLY Dynavolt Intact GP	Kalex	15	+1 Lap	2	
23	81	(Australia) Senna Agius	LIQUI MOLY Dynavolt Intact GP	Kalex	15	+1 Lap	15	
24	75	(Spain) Albert Arenas	ITALJET Gresini Moto2	Kalex	15	+1 Lap	20	
25	16	(United States) Joe Roberts	OnlyFans American Racing Team	Kalex	15	+1 Lap	19	
Ret	53	(Turkey) Deniz Öncü	Red Bull KTM Ajo	Kalex	12	Crashed out	10	
Ret	12	(Czech Republic) Filip Salač	ELF Marc VDS Racing Team	Boscoscuro	5	Tyres	9	
DNS	15	(South Africa) Darryn Binder	ITALJET Gresini Moto2	Kalex		Injury	27	
Fastest lap: (Spain) Manuel González (Kalex) – 2:15.397 (lap 15)
OFFICIAL MOTOGP RACE REPORT

=== Moto3 ===
Pos.	No.	Rider	Team	Manufacturer	Laps	Time/Retired	Grid	Points
1	99	(Spain) José Antonio Rueda	Red Bull KTM Ajo	KTM	14	31:23.456	4	25
2	66	(Australia) Joel Kelso	LEVELUP-MTA	KTM	14	+2.399	3	20
3	18	(Italy) Matteo Bertelle	LEVELUP-MTA	KTM	14	+4.200	10	16
4	36	(Spain) Ángel Piqueras	FRINSA - MT Helmets - MSI	KTM	14	+5.345	11	13
5	28	(Spain) Máximo Quiles	CFMOTO Valresa Aspar Team	KTM	14	+5.522	2	11
6	83	(Spain) Álvaro Carpe	Red Bull KTM Ajo	KTM	14	+7.309	7	10
7	71	(Italy) Dennis Foggia	CFMOTO Valresa Aspar Team	KTM	14	+21.815	5	9
8	11	(Spain) Adrián Cruces	CIP Green Power	KTM	14	+22.069	16	8
9	72	(Japan) Taiyo Furusato	Hnda Team Asia	Honda	14	+22.251	17	7
10	14	(New Zealand) Cormac Buchanan	DENSSI Racing - BOE	KTM	14	+22.459	15	6
11	94	(Italy) Guido Pini	LIQUI MOLY Dynavolt Intact GP	KTM	14	+22.558	12	5
12	31	(Spain) Adrián Fernández	Leopard Racing	Honda	14	+24.189	9	4
13	22	(Spain) David Almansa	Leopard Racing	Honda	14	+24.919	18	3
14	12	(Australia) Jacob Roulstone	Red Bull KTM Tech3	KTM	14	+25.592	23	2
15	10	(Italy) Nicola Carraro	Rivacold Snipers Team	Honda	14	+26.786	20	1
16	21	(South Africa) Ruche Moodley	DENSSI Racing - BOE	KTM	14	+26.966	22	
17	8	(United Kingdom) Eddie O'Shea	GRYD - Mlav Racing	Honda	14	+31.800	24	
18	34	(Austria) Jakob Rosenthaler	GRYD - Mlav Racing	Honda	14	+57.135	25	
19	6	(Japan) Ryusei Yamanaka	FRINSA - MT Helmets - MSI	KTM	14	+2:01.645	19	
Ret	73	(Argentina) Valentín Perrone	Red Bull KTM Tech3	KTM	9	Crashed out	21	
Ret	19	(United Kingdom) Scott Ogden	CIP Green Power	KTM	8	Injury	13	
Ret	82	(Italy) Stefano Nepa	SIC58 Squadra Corse	Honda	7	Crashed out	8	
Ret	64	(Spain) David Muñoz	LIQUI MOLY Dynavolt Intact GP	KTM	6	Retired after crash	1	
Ret	58	(Italy) Luca Lunetta	SIC58 Squadra Corse	Honda	4	Crashed out	6	
Ret	54	(Italy) Riccardo Rossi	Rivacold Snipers Team	Honda	1	Crashed out	14	
DNS	5	(Thailand) Tatchakorn Buasri	Honda Team Asia	Honda		DNS: Injury		
Fastest lap: (Italy) Matteo Bertelle (KTM) – 2:13.939 (lap 6)
OFFICIAL MOTOGP RACE REPORT

== Championship standings after the race ==
Below are the standings for the top five riders, constructors, and teams after the round.

=== MotoGP ===
Riders' Championship standings

	Pos.	Rider	Points
1	1	(Spain) Álex Márquez	87
1	2	(Spain) Marc Márquez	86
	3	(Italy) Francesco Bagnaia	75
	4	(Italy) Franco Morbidelli	55
1	5	(Italy) Fabio Di Giannantonio	44

Constructors' Championship standings

	Pos.	Constructor	Points
	1	(Italy) Ducati	111
	2	(Japan) Honda	36
1	3	(Austria) KTM	34
1	4	(Italy) Aprilia	33
	5	(Japan) Yamaha	28

Teams' Championship standings

	Pos.	Team	Points
	1	(Italy) Ducati Lenovo Team	161
1	2	(Italy) Pertamina Enduro VR46 Racing Team	99
1	3	(Italy) BK8 Gresini Racing MotoGP	90
	4	(Austria) Red Bull KTM Factory Racing	35
2	5	(United States) Trackhouse MotoGP Team	30

=== Moto2 ===
Riders' Championship standings

	Pos.	Rider	Points
1	1	(United Kingdom) Jake Dixon	59
1	2	(Spain) Arón Canet	46
2	3	(Spain) Manuel González	45
5	4	(Spain) Alonso López	30
9	5	(Italy) Tony Arbolino	28

Constructors' Championship standings

	Pos.	Constructor	Points
1	1	(Italy) Boscoscuro	59
1	2	(Germany) Kalex	58
	3	(Switzerland) Forward	10

Teams' Championship standings

	Pos.	Team	Points
1	1	(Italy) Fantic Racing Lino Sonego	69
1	2	(Belgium) Elf Marc VDS Racing Team	66
2	3	(Germany) Liqui Moly Dynavolt Intact GP	64
	4	(Italy) Team HDR Heidrun	46
5	5	(Italy) Blu Cru Pramac Yamaha Moto2	40

=== Moto3 ===
Riders' Championship standings

	Pos.	Rider	Points
	1	(Spain) José Antonio Rueda	66
1	2	(Spain) Ángel Piqueras	42
1	3	(Spain) Adrián Fernández	40
	4	(Italy) Matteo Bertelle	40
	5	(Spain) Álvaro Carpe	30

Constructors' Championship standings

Pos.	Constructor	Points
1	(Austria) KTM	75
2	(Japan) Honda	43

Teams' Championship standings

	Pos.	Team	Points
	1	(Finland) Red Bull KTM Ajo	96
3	2	(Italy) LevelUp – MTA	68
1	3	(Luxembourg) Leopard Racing	62
1	4	(Spain) Frinsa – MT Helmets – MSi	49
1	5	(Spain) CFMoto Valresa Aspar Team	35

Previous race: 2025 Argentine Grand Prix	FIM Grand Prix World Championship; 2025 season	Next race: 2025 Qatar Grand Prix
Previous race: 2024 Grand Prix of the Americas	Motorcycle Grand Prix of the Americas	Next race: None
