= List of MeSH codes (A02) =

A02-prefix MeSH codes

The following is a partial list of the "A" codes for Medical Subject Headings (MeSH), as defined by the United States National Library of Medicine (NLM).

This list continues the information at List of MeSH codes (A01) Codes following these are found at List of MeSH codes (A03). For other MeSH codes, see List of MeSH codes.

Authoritative sources for this content are the MeSH Browser and MeSH SPARQL Explorer.

== MeSH A02 – musculoskeletal system ==
=== MeSH A02.165 – cartilage ===
==== MeSH A02.165.257 – elastic cartilage ====
- MeSH A02.165.257.250 – ear cartilages
- MeSH A02.165.257.625 – laryngeal cartilages
  - MeSH A02.165.257.625.083 – arytenoid cartilage
  - MeSH A02.165.257.625.211 – cricoid cartilage
  - MeSH A02.165.257.625.411 – epiglottis
  - MeSH A02.165.257.625.870 – thyroid cartilage

==== MeSH A02.165.308 – fibrocartilage ====
- MeSH A02.165.308.410 – intervertebral disc
  - MeSH A02.165.308.410.250 – annulus fibrosus
  - MeSH A02.165.308.410.500 – nucleus fibrosus
- MeSH A02.165.308.538 – meniscus
  - MeSH A02.165.308.538.500 – tibial menisci
- MeSH A02.165.308.575 – palmar plate
- MeSH A02.165.308.650 – plantar plate
- MeSH A02.165.308.800 – triangular fibrocartilage

==== MeSH A02.165.407 – hyaline cartilage ====
- MeSH A02.165.407.150 – articular cartilage
- MeSH A02.165.407.325 – costal cartilage
- MeSH A02.165.407.500 – laryngeal cartilages
  - MeSH A02.165.407.500.083 – arytenoid cartilage
  - MeSH A02.165.407.500.211 – cricoid cartilage
  - MeSH A02.165.407.500.411 – epiglottis
  - MeSH A02.165.407.500.870 – thyroid cartilage
- MeSH A02.165.407.550 – nasal cartilages

=== MeSH A02.513 – ligaments ===
==== MeSH A02.513.514 – articular ligament ====
- MeSH A02.513.514.100 – anterior cruciate ligament
- MeSH A02.513.514.162 – collateral ligament
  - MeSH A02.513.514.162.250 – ulnar collateral ligament
  - MeSH A02.513.514.162.500 – lateral collateral ligament of ankle joint
  - MeSH A02.513.514.162.600 – knee medial collateral ligament
- MeSH A02.513.514.287 – ligamentum flavum
- MeSH A02.513.514.350 – longitudinal ligaments
- MeSH A02.513.514.475 – patellar ligament
- MeSH A02.513.514.538 – plantar plate
- MeSH A02.513.514.600 – posterior cruciate ligament
- MeSH A02.513.514.800 – round ligament of femur

==== MeSH A02.513.901 – round ligament ====
- MeSH A02.513.901.500 – femur round ligament
- MeSH A02.513.901.750 – liver round ligament
- MeSH A02.513.901.875 – uteri round ligament

=== MeSH A02.633 – muscles ===
==== MeSH A02.633.567 – skeletal muscle ====
- MeSH A02.633.567.050 – abdominal muscles
  - MeSH A02.633.567.050.375 – abdominal oblique muscles
  - MeSH A02.633.567.050.750 – pelvic floor
  - MeSH A02.633.567.050.800 – rectus abdominis
- MeSH A02.633.567.175 – back muscles
  - MeSH A02.633.567.175.500 – intermediate back muscles
  - MeSH A02.633.567.175.750 – paraspinal muscles
  - MeSH A02.633.567.175.875 – superficial back muscles
- MeSH A02.633.567.300 – deltoid muscle
- MeSH A02.633.567.400 – facial muscles
- MeSH A02.633.567.425 – gracilis muscle
- MeSH A02.633.567.450 – hamstring muscles
- MeSH A02.633.567.500 – laryngeal muscles
- MeSH A02.633.567.600 – masticatory muscles
  - MeSH A02.633.567.600.500 – masseter muscle
  - MeSH A02.633.567.600.700 – pterygoid muscles
  - MeSH A02.633.567.600.850 – temporal muscle
- MeSH A02.633.567.650 – neck muscles
- MeSH A02.633.567.700 – oculomotor muscles
- MeSH A02.633.567.750 – palatal muscles
- MeSH A02.633.567.775 – pectoralis muscles
- MeSH A02.633.567.800 – pharyngeal muscles
  - MeSH A02.633.567.800.360 – upper esophageal sphincter
  - MeSH A02.633.567.800.680 – velopharyngeal sphincter
- MeSH A02.633.567.825 – psoas muscles
- MeSH A02.633.567.850 – quadriceps muscle
- MeSH A02.633.567.900 – respiratory muscles
  - MeSH A02.633.567.900.300 – diaphragm
  - MeSH A02.633.567.900.500 – intercostal muscles
- MeSH A02.633.567.912 – rotator cuff
- MeSH A02.633.567.950 – stapedius
- MeSH A02.633.567.975 – tensor tympani

==== MeSH A02.633.570 – smooth muscle ====
- MeSH A02.633.570.210 – lower esophageal sphincter
- MeSH A02.633.570.491 – smooth vascular muscle
- MeSH A02.633.570.500 – myometrium

==== MeSH A02.633.580 – myocardium ====
- MeSH A02.633.580.680 – papillary muscles

=== MeSH A02.835 – skeleton ===
==== MeSH A02.835.232 – bone and bones ====
- MeSH A02.835.232.022 – bone-impact interface
- MeSH A02.835.232.043 – bones of lower extremity
  - MeSH A02.835.232.043.150 – femur
    - MeSH A02.835.232.043.150.343 – femur head
    - MeSH A02.835.232.043.150.510 – femur neck
  - MeSH A02.835.232.043.300 – foot bones
    - MeSH A02.835.232.043.300.492 – metatarsal bones
    - MeSH A02.835.232.043.300.710 – tarsal bones
      - MeSH A02.835.232.043.300.710.300 – calcaneus
      - MeSH A02.835.232.043.300.710.780 – talus
    - MeSH A02.835.232.043.300.800 – toe phalanges
  - MeSH A02.835.232.043.650 – leg bones
    - MeSH A02.835.232.043.650.321 – fibula
    - MeSH A02.835.232.043.650.624 – patella
    - MeSH A02.835.232.043.650.883 – tibia
  - MeSH A02.835.232.043.825 – pelvic bones
    - MeSH A02.835.232.043.825.108 – acetabulum
    - MeSH A02.835.232.043.825.434 – ilium
    - MeSH A02.835.232.043.825.548 – ischium
    - MeSH A02.835.232.043.825.781 – public bone
- MeSH A02.835.232.087 – bones of upper extremity
  - MeSH A02.835.232.087.090 – arm bones
    - MeSH A02.835.232.087.090.400 – humerus
      - MeSH A02.835.232.087.090.400.400 – humeral head
    - MeSH A02.835.232.087.090.700 – radius
    - MeSH A02.835.232.087.090.850 – ulna
      - MeSH A02.835.232.087.090.850.600 – olecranon process
  - MeSH A02.835.232.087.227 – clavicle
  - MeSH A02.835.232.087.319 – hand bones
    - MeSH A02.835.232.087.319.150 – carpal bones
      - MeSH A02.835.232.087.319.150.150 – capitate bone
      - MeSH A02.835.232.087.319.150.400 – hamate bone
      - MeSH A02.835.232.087.319.150.500 – lunate bone
      - MeSH A02.835.232.087.319.150.600 – pisiform bone
      - MeSH A02.835.232.087.319.150.750 – scaphoid bone
      - MeSH A02.835.232.087.319.150.800 – trapezium bone
      - MeSH A02.835.232.087.319.150.805 – trapezoid bone
      - MeSH A02.835.232.087.319.150.831 – triquetrum bone
    - MeSH A02.835.232.087.319.350 – finger phalanges
    - MeSH A02.835.232.087.319.550 – metacarpal bones
  - MeSH A02.835.232.087.783 – scapula
    - MeSH A02.835.232.087.783.261 – acromion
    - MeSH A02.835.232.087.783.356 – coracoid process
    - MeSH A02.835.232.087.783.450 – glenoid cavity
- MeSH A02.835.232.169 – diaphyses
- MeSH A02.835.232.251 – epiphyses
  - MeSH A02.835.232.251.352 – growth plate
- MeSH A02.835.232.409 – hyoid bones
- MeSH A02.835.232.570 – rib cage
  - MeSH A02.835.232.570.500 – ribs
    - MeSH A02.835.232.570.500.150 – cervical rib
  - MeSH A02.835.232.570.750 – sternum
    - MeSH A02.835.232.570.750.442 – manubrium
    - MeSH A02.835.232.570.750.825 – xiphoid bone
- MeSH A02.835.232.730 – sesamoid bones
  - MeSH A02.835.232.730.500 – patella
- MeSH A02.835.232.781 – skull
  - MeSH A02.835.232.781.175 – cranial fontanelles
  - MeSH A02.835.232.781.200 – cranial sutures
  - MeSH A02.835.232.781.292 – ethmoid bone
  - MeSH A02.835.232.781.324 – facial bones
    - MeSH A02.835.232.781.324.502 – jaw
      - MeSH A02.835.232.781.324.502.125 – alveolar process
        - MeSH A02.835.232.781.324.502.125.800 – tooth socket
      - MeSH A02.835.232.781.324.502.320 – dental arch
      - MeSH A02.835.232.781.324.502.632 – mandible
        - MeSH A02.835.232.781.324.502.632.130 – chin
        - MeSH A02.835.232.781.324.502.632.365 – mandibular canal
        - MeSH A02.835.232.781.324.502.632.600 – mandibular condyle
        - MeSH A02.835.232.781.324.502.632.800 – mental foramen
      - MeSH A02.835.232.781.324.502.645 – maxilla
      - MeSH A02.835.232.781.324.502.660 – hard palate
    - MeSH A02.835.232.781.324.665 – nasal bone
    - MeSH A02.835.232.781.324.690 – orbit
    - MeSH A02.835.232.781.324.948 – turbinates
    - MeSH A02.835.232.781.324.971 – vomer
    - MeSH A02.835.232.781.324.995 – zygoma
  - MeSH A02.835.232.781.375 – frontal bone
  - MeSH A02.835.232.781.572 – occipital bone
    - MeSH A02.835.232.781.572.434 – foramen magnum
  - MeSH A02.835.232.781.651 – parietal bone
  - MeSH A02.835.232.781.670 – pterygopalatine fossa
  - MeSH A02.835.232.781.750 – skull base
    - MeSH A02.835.232.781.750.150 – anterior cranial fossa
    - MeSH A02.835.232.781.750.165 – middle cranial fossa
    - MeSH A02.835.232.781.750.400 – posterior cranial fossa
      - MeSH A02.835.232.781.750.400.500 – jugular foramina
    - MeSH A02.835.232.781.750.700 – infratemporal fossa
    - MeSH A02.835.232.781.750.850 – parapharyngeal space
  - MeSH A02.835.232.781.802 – sphenoid bone
    - MeSH A02.835.232.781.802.662 – sella turcica
  - MeSH A02.835.232.781.885 – temporal bone
    - MeSH A02.835.232.781.885.444 – mastoid
    - MeSH A02.835.232.781.885.681 – petrous bone
- MeSH A02.835.232.834 – spine
  - MeSH A02.835.232.834.151 – cervical vertebrae
    - MeSH A02.835.232.834.151.383 – cervical vertebra axis
      - MeSH A02.835.232.834.151.383.668 – odontoid process
    - MeSH A02.835.232.834.151.500 – cervical atlas
  - MeSH A02.835.232.834.229 – coccyx
  - MeSH A02.835.232.834.432 – intervertebral disc
    - MeSH A02.835.232.834.432.250 – annulus fibrosus
    - MeSH A02.835.232.834.432.500 – nucleus pulposus
  - MeSH A02.835.232.834.519 – lumbar vertebrae
  - MeSH A02.835.232.834.717 – sacrum
  - MeSH A02.835.232.834.803 – spinal canal
    - MeSH A02.835.232.834.803.350 – epidural space
  - MeSH A02.835.232.834.892 – thoracic vertebrae
  - MeSH A02.835.232.834.946 – vertebral body

==== MeSH A02.835.583 – joints ====
- MeSH A02.835.583.032 – acromioclavicular joint
- MeSH A02.835.583.097 – atlanto-axial joint
- MeSH A02.835.583.101 – atlanto-occipital joint
- MeSH A02.835.583.156 – synovial bursa
- MeSH A02.835.583.192 – articular cartilage
- MeSH A02.835.583.290 – elbow joint
- MeSH A02.835.583.378 – foot joints
  - MeSH A02.835.583.378.062 – ankle joint
  - MeSH A02.835.583.378.531 – metatarsophalangeal joint
    - MeSH A02.835.583.378.531.500 – plantar plate
  - MeSH A02.835.583.378.831 – tarsal joints
    - MeSH A02.835.583.378.831.780 – subtalar joint
  - MeSH A02.835.583.378.900 – toe joint
    - MeSH A02.835.583.378.900.500 – plantar plate
- MeSH A02.835.583.405 – hand joints
  - MeSH A02.835.583.405.174 – carpal joints
  - MeSH A02.835.583.405.200 – carpometacarpal joints
  - MeSH A02.835.583.405.350 – finger joint
  - MeSH A02.835.583.405.500 – metacarpophalangeal joint
    - MeSH A02.835.583.405.500.900 – palmar plate
  - MeSH A02.835.583.405.930 – wrist joint
    - MeSH A02.835.583.405.930.800 – triangular fibrocartilage
- MeSH A02.835.583.411 – hip joint
  - MeSH A02.835.583.411.500 – round ligament of femur
- MeSH A02.835.583.443 – joint capsule
  - MeSH A02.835.583.443.800 – synovial membrane
    - MeSH A02.835.583.443.800.800 – synovial fluid
- MeSH A02.835.583.475 – knee joint
  - MeSH A02.835.583.475.590 – tibial menisci
  - MeSH A02.835.583.475.650 – patellofemoral joint
  - MeSH A02.835.583.475.825 – tibiofemoral joint
- MeSH A02.835.583.512 – articular ligaments
  - MeSH A02.835.583.512.100 – anterior cruciate ligament
  - MeSH A02.835.583.512.162 – collateral ligaments
    - MeSH A02.835.583.512.162.250 – ulnar collateral ligament
    - MeSH A02.835.583.512.162.500 – ankle lateral ligament
    - MeSH A02.835.583.512.162.600 – knee medial collateral ligament
  - MeSH A02.835.583.512.287 – ligamentum flavum
  - MeSH A02.835.583.512.350 – longitudinal ligaments
  - MeSH A02.835.583.512.400 – palmar plate
  - MeSH A02.835.583.512.475 – patellar ligament
  - MeSH A02.835.583.512.538 – plantar plate
  - MeSH A02.835.583.512.600 – posterior cruciate ligament
  - MeSH A02.835.583.512.950 – round ligament of femur
- MeSH A02.835.583.656 – pubic symphysis
- MeSH A02.835.583.707 – sacroiliac joint
- MeSH A02.835.583.748 – shoulder joint
- MeSH A02.835.583.781 – sternoclavicular joint
- MeSH A02.835.583.790 – sternocostal joints
- MeSH A02.835.583.861 – temporomandibular joint
  - MeSH A02.835.583.861.900 – temporomandibular joint disc
- MeSH A02.835.583.979 – zygapophyseal joint
