= List of MeSH codes (A04) =

List of A04 MeSH codes

The following is a partial list of the "A" codes for Medical Subject Headings (MeSH), as defined by the United States National Library of Medicine (NLM).

This list continues the information at List of MeSH codes (A03). Codes following these are found at List of MeSH codes (A05). For other MeSH codes, see List of MeSH codes.

Authoritative sources for this content are the MeSH Browser and MeSH SPARQL Explorer.

== MeSH A04 – respiratory system ==
=== MeSH A04.329 – larynx ===
- MeSH A04.329.364 – glottis
- MeSH A04.329.364.737 – vocal cords
- MeSH A04.329.591 – laryngeal cartilages
- MeSH A04.329.591.085 – arytenoid cartilage
- MeSH A04.329.591.211 – cricoid cartilage
- MeSH A04.329.591.411 – epiglottis
- MeSH A04.329.591.870 – thyroid cartilage
- MeSH A04.329.597 – laryngeal mucosa
- MeSH A04.329.597.320 – goblet cells
- MeSH A04.329.604 – laryngeal muscles

=== MeSH A04.411 – lung ===
- MeSH A04.411.125 – bronchi
- MeSH A04.411.125.500 - bronchioles
- MeSH A04.411.715 – pulmonary alveoli
- MeSH A04.411.715.100 - alveolar epithelial cells
- MeSH A04.411.715.025 – blood-air barrier

=== MeSH A04.531 – nose ===
- MeSH A04.531.378 – nasal bone
- MeSH A04.531.413 - nasal cartilage
- MeSH A04.531.449 – nasal cavity
- MeSH A04.531.520 – nasal mucosa
- MeSH A04.531.520.320 – goblet cells
- MeSH A04.531.520.573 – olfactory mucosa
- MeSH A04.531.520.573.580 – olfactory receptor neurons
- MeSH A04.531.591 – nasal septum
- MeSH A04.531.591.940 – vomeronasal organ
- MeSH A04.531.621 – paranasal sinuses
- MeSH A04.531.621.267 – ethmoid sinus
- MeSH A04.531.621.387 – frontal sinus
- MeSH A04.531.621.578 – maxillary sinus
- MeSH A04.531.621.827 – sphenoid sinus
- MeSH A04.531.898 – turbinates

=== MeSH A04.623 – pharynx ===
- MeSH A04.623.490 – hypopharynx
- MeSH A04.623.490.600 - pyriform sinus
- MeSH A04.623.557 – nasopharynx
- MeSH A04.623.557.500 - adenoid
- MeSH A04.623.603 – oropharynx
- MeSH A04.623.603.925 – tonsil
- MeSH A04.623.617 – pharyngeal muscles
- MeSH A04.623.617.360 – esophageal sphincter, upper
- MeSH A04.623.617.680 - velopharyngeal port

=== MeSH A04.760 – respiratory mucosa ===
- MeSH A04.760.259 – goblet cells
- MeSH A04.760.520 – laryngeal mucosa
- MeSH A04.760.600 – nasal mucosa
- MeSH A04.760.600.640 – olfactory mucosa
- MeSH A04.760.600.640.640 – olfactory receptor neurons
