= Fricative =

Consonants produced by forcing air through a narrow channel

A fricative is a consonant produced by forcing air through a narrow channel made by placing two articulators close together, forming a tight stricture. These may be the lower lip against the upper teeth, in the case of [f]; the back of the tongue against the soft palate in the case of German [x] (the final consonant of Bach); or the side of the tongue against the molars, in the case of Welsh [ɬ] (appearing twice in the name Llanelli). This turbulent airflow is called frication.

A particular subset of fricatives are sibilants, produced with higher amplitude and pitch, and with the airflow going on to strike the edge of some obstruction (such as the teeth). Examples of sibilants in English are [s, z, ʃ, ʒ].

The usage of two other terms is less standardized: "Spirant" is an older term used by some American and European phoneticians and phonologists for non-sibilant fricatives. It contrasts with the term "strident", which could just mean "sibilant", but some authors also include labiodental and uvular fricatives in the class.

== Types ==
The airflow is not completely stopped in the production of fricative consonants. In other words, the airflow experiences friction.

=== Sibilant fricatives ===
- [s] voiceless coronal sibilant, as in English sip
- [z] voiced coronal sibilant, as in English zip
- [ʃ] voiceless palato-alveolar sibilant, as in English ship
- [ʒ] voiced palato-alveolar sibilant, as in English measure
- [ɕ] voiceless alveolo-palatal sibilant
- [ʑ] voiced alveolo-palatal sibilant
- [ʂ] voiceless retroflex sibilant
- [ʐ] voiced retroflex sibilant

All sibilants are coronal, but may be dental, alveolar, postalveolar, or palatal (retroflex) within that range. However, alongside the differences in place of articulation, they exhibit a variety of tongue shapes. Prototypical retroflexes are subapical and palatal, but they are usually written with the same symbol as the apical postalveolars. The alveolars and dentals may also be either apical or laminal, but this difference is indicated with diacritics rather than with separate symbols.

=== Non-sibilant fricatives ===
==== Median fricatives ====
- [ɸ] voiceless bilabial fricative
- [β] voiced bilabial fricative
- [f] voiceless labiodental fricative, as in English fine
- [v] voiced labiodental fricative, as in English vine
- [θ̼] voiceless linguolabial fricative
- [ð̼] voiced linguolabial fricative
- [θ], [θ̟] voiceless dental non-sibilant fricative, as in English thing
- [ð], [ð̟] voiced dental non-sibilant fricative, as in English that
- [θ̠], [ɹ̝̊] voiceless alveolar non-sibilant fricative
- [ð̠], [ɹ̝] voiced alveolar non-sibilant fricative
- [r̝̊] Voiceless alveolar fricative trill
- [r̝] Voiced alveolar fricative trill
- [ç] voiceless palatal fricative
- [ʝ] voiced palatal fricative
- [x] voiceless velar fricative
- [ɣ] voiced velar fricative
- [ɧ] voiceless palatal-velar fricative (articulation disputed)

==== Epiglottal fricatives ====
- [ʜ] voiceless epiglottal fricative
- [ʢ] voiced epiglottal fricative

Epiglottal fricatives have also been re-analyzed instead as pharyngeal trills.

==== Velopharyngeal fricatives ====
- [ʩ] in extIPA voiceless velopharyngeal fricative (often occurs with a cleft palate)
- [ʩ̬] in extIPA voiced velopharyngeal fricative

==== Lateral fricatives ====
- [ɬ̪] voiceless dental lateral fricative
- [ɮ̪] voiced dental lateral fricative
- [ɬ] voiceless alveolar lateral fricative
- [ɮ] voiced alveolar lateral fricative
- [ɬ̠] voiceless postalveolar lateral fricative (Mehri)
- [ɮ̠] voiced postalveolar lateral fricative
- [ɭ˔̥] or extIPA [ꞎ] voiceless retroflex lateral fricative
- [ɭ˔] or extIPA [𝼅] Voiced retroflex lateral fricative (in Ao)
- [ʎ̥˔] or [ʎ̝̥] or extIPA [𝼆] voiceless palatal lateral fricative
- [ʎ̝] or extIPA [𝼆̬] voiced palatal lateral fricative (allophonic in Jebero)
- [ʟ̝̊] or extIPA [𝼄] voiceless velar lateral fricative
- [ʟ̝] or extIPA [𝼄̬] voiced velar lateral fricative

The lateral fricative occurs as the ll of Welsh, as in Lloyd, Llewelyn, and Machynlleth ([maˈxənɬɛθ], a town), as the unvoiced 'hl' and voiced 'dl' or 'dhl' in the several languages of Southern Africa (such as Xhosa and Zulu), and in Mongolian.

- ʪ or [ɬ͜s] and [θ͜ɬ] voiceless lateral-median fricative (a laterally lisped [s] or [θ]) (Modern South Arabian)
- ʫ or [ɮ͜z] and [ð͜ɮ] voiced lateral-median fricative (a laterally lisped [z] or [ð]) (Modern South Arabian)

==== Guttural fricatives ====
- [χ] voiceless uvular fricative
- [ʁ] voiced uvular fricative
- [ħ] voiceless pharyngeal fricative
- [ʕ] voiced pharyngeal fricative

No language distinguishes fricatives from approximants at these places, so the same symbol is used for both (depending on the recognition of voiceless approximants for the voiceless fricatives). For the pharyngeals, approximants are generally more common than fricatives. A fricative realization may be specified by adding an uptack to the letters, [χ̝, ʁ̝, ħ̝, ʕ̝], or conversely, a downtack may be added to specify an approximant realization, [χ̞, ʁ̞, ħ̞, ʕ̞].

(The bilabial approximant and dental approximant do not have dedicated symbols either and are transcribed in a similar fashion: [β̞, ð̞]. However, the base letters are generally understood to specifically refer to the fricatives.)

==== Glottal pseudo-fricatives ====
- [h] voiceless glottal transition, as in English hat
- [ɦ] breathy-voiced glottal transition

In many languages, such as English or Korean, the glottal "fricatives" are unaccompanied phonation states of the glottis, without any accompanying manner, fricative or otherwise. They may be mistaken for real glottal constrictions in a number of languages, such as Finnish.

=== Aspirated fricatives ===
Fricatives are very commonly voiced, though cross-linguistically voiced fricatives are not nearly as common as tenuis ("plain") fricatives. Other phonations are common in languages that have those phonations in their stop consonants. However, phonemically aspirated fricatives are rare. /s~sʰ/ contrasts with a tense, unaspirated /s͈/ in Korean; aspirated fricatives are also found in a few Sino-Tibetan languages, in some Oto-Manguean languages, in the Siouan language Ofo (/sʰ/ and /fʰ/), and in the (central?) Chumashan languages (/sʰ/ and /ʃʰ/). The record may be Choni, which has four contrastive aspirated fricatives: /sʰ ʂʰ ɕʰ xʰ/.

=== Nasalized fricatives ===
Frication requires high air pressure, while nasalization lowers pressure by allowing air to escape through the velopharyngeal port. It is hypothesized that nasalization generally has a deleterious effect on the acoustic distinctiveness of fricatives, explaining the typological rarity of nasalized fricatives.

Kwangali and Souletin Basque have /h̃/. In Coatzospan Mixtec, [β̃, ð̃, s̃, ʃ̃] appear allophonically before a nasal vowel, and in Igbo nasality is a feature of the syllable; when /f v s z ʃ ʒ/ occur in nasal syllables they are themselves nasalized. A similar feature exists in Eperara, where [β̃] is an allophone of /w/ in nasal syllables.

Umbundu has been argued to have /ṽ/ in four words; in Schadeberg's analysis, nasalized continuants are the source of spreading nasality instead of nasal vowels or occlusives.

=== Table ===
Types of fricative (Note: There are likely to be more aspirated, murmured and nasalized fricatives than shown here. ⟨s̄ ṣ ŝ⟩ are not IPA transcription.)
	bilabial	labio- dental	linguo- labial	inter- dental	dental	denti- alveolar	alveolar	post- alveolar	palatal/ retroflex	velar	uvular	pharyn- geal	glottal
central non-sibilant	ɸ β	f v fʰ vʱ	θ̼ ð̼	θ̟ ð̟ (θ̪͆ ð̪͆)	θ ð	θ̠ ð̠	θ͇ ð͇ (laminal) ɹ̝̊ ɹ̝ (apical)	ɹ̠̊˔ ɹ̠˔	ç ʝ (laminal) ɻ̝̊ ɻ̝ (apical)	x ɣ xʰ ɣʱ	χ̝ ʁ̝	ħ̝ ʕ̝	h̝ ɦ̝
lateral fricative	ɸ β	f v fʰ vʱ			ɬ̪ ɮ̪		ɬ ɮ ɬʰ ɮʱ	ɬ̠ ɮ̠	𝼆 ʎ̝ (laminal) ꞎ ɭ˔ (apical)	𝼄 ʟ̝			
laminal sibilant					s̻̪ z̻̪	s̄ z̄ (s̟ z̟)	s͇ z͇ s͇ʰ z͇ʱ	s̠ z̠ (s̻̠ z̻̠) ʃ̻ ʒ̻ (domed) ŝ ẑ (ʆ ʓ) (closed)	ɕ ʑ ɕʰ ʑʱ				
apical sibilant					s̺̪ z̺̪		s̺ z̺	ṣ ẓ (s̺̠ z̺̠) ʃ̺ ʒ̺ ʃʰ ʒʱ	ʂ ʐ ʂʰ ʐʱ				
fricative trill							r̝̊ r̝				ʀ̝̊ ʀ̝	ʜ ʢ	
fricative flap							ɾ̞̊ ɾ̞						
nasalized fricative	ɸ̃ β̃	f̃ ṽ			θ̃ ð̃		s̃ z̃	ʃ̃ ʒ̃					h̃

== Occurrence ==
Until its extinction, Ubykh may have been the language with the most fricatives (29, excluding /h/), some of which did not have dedicated symbols or diacritics in the IPA. This number actually outstrips the number of all consonants in English (which has 24 consonants). By contrast, approximately 8.7% of the world's languages have no phonemic fricatives at all. This is a typical feature of Australian Aboriginal languages, where the few fricatives that exist result from changes to plosives or approximants, but also occurs in some indigenous languages of New Guinea and South America that have especially small numbers of consonants. However, whereas [h] is entirely unknown in indigenous Australian languages, most of the other languages without true fricatives do have [h] in their consonant inventory.

Voicing contrasts in fricatives are largely confined to Europe, Africa, and Western Asia. Languages of South and East Asia, such as Mandarin Chinese, Korean, and the Austronesian languages, typically do not have such voiced fricatives as [z] and [v], which are familiar to many European speakers. In some Dravidian languages they occur as allophones. These voiced fricatives are also relatively rare in indigenous languages of the Americas. Overall, voicing contrasts in fricatives are much rarer than in plosives, being found only in about a third of the world's languages as compared to 60 percent for plosive voicing contrasts.

About 15 percent of the world's languages, however, have unpaired voiced fricatives, i.e. a voiced fricative without a voiceless counterpart. Two-thirds of these, or 10 percent of all languages, have unpaired voiced fricatives but no voicing contrast between any fricative pair.

This phenomenon occurs because voiced fricatives have developed from lenition of plosives or fortition of approximants. This phenomenon of unpaired voiced fricatives is scattered throughout the world, but is confined to nonsibilant fricatives with the exception of a couple of languages that have [ʒ] but lack [ʃ]. (Relatedly, several languages have the voiced affricate [dʒ] but lack [tʃ], and vice versa.) The fricatives that occur most often without a voiceless counterpart are – in order of ratio of unpaired occurrences to total occurrences – [ʝ], [β], [ð], [ʁ] and [ɣ].

== Acoustics ==
Fricatives appear in waveforms as somewhat random noise caused by the turbulent airflow, upon which a periodic pattern is overlaid if voiced. Fricatives produced in the front of the mouth tend to have energy concentration at higher frequencies than ones produced in the back. The centre of gravity (CoG), i.e. the average frequency in a spectrum weighted by the amplitude (also known as spectral mean), may be used to determine the place of articulation of a fricative relative to that of another.

== See also ==
- Affricate
- Grooved fricative
- Apical consonant
- Hush consonant
- Laminal consonant
- List of phonetics topics

== Bibliography ==
- Esling, John (2010). "Phonetic Notation". In Hardcastle, William J.; Laver, John; Gibbon, Fiona E. (eds.). The Handbook of Phonetic Sciences (2nd ed.). Wiley-Blackwell. p. 695.
- Jacques, Guillaume (2011). "A panchronic study of aspirated fricatives, with new evidence from Pumi" (PDF). Lingua. 121 (9): 1518–1538. doi:10.1016/j.lingua.2011.04.003. S2CID 56166344.
- Johnson, Keith (2012). Acoustic and Auditory Phonetics (3rd ed.). Wiley-Blackwell. pp. 162–163. ISBN 978-1-4051-9466-2.
- Kiss, Zoltán G. (2013). "Measuring acoustic correlates of voicing in stops and fricatives". In Szigetvári, Péter (ed.). VLlxx: Papers Presented to László Varga on His 70th Birthday. Budapest: Department of English Linguistics, Eötvös Loránd University.
- Ladefoged, Peter; Maddieson, Ian (1996). The Sounds of the World's Languages. Oxford: Blackwell. ISBN 0-631-19814-8.
- Laufer, Asher (1991). "Phonetic Representation: Glottal Fricatives". Journal of the International Phonetic Association. 21 (2): 91–93. doi:10.1017/S0025100300004448. S2CID 145231104.
- Laver, John (1994). Principles of Phonetics. Cambridge: Cambridge University Press. ISBN 0-521-45655-X.
- Lodge, Ken (2009). A Critical Introduction to Phonetics. New York: Continuum International Publishing Group. ISBN 978-0-8264-8873-2.
- Maddieson, Ian (1984). Patterns of Sounds. Cambridge: Cambridge University Press. ISBN 0-521-26536-3.
- Maddieson, Ian (2005). "Voicing in Plosives and Fricatives". In Haspelmath, Martin; et al. (eds.). The World Atlas of Language Structures. Oxford: Oxford University Press. pp. 26–29. ISBN 0-19-925591-1.
- Schadeberg, Thilo C. (1982). "Nasalization in Umbundu". Journal of African Languages and Linguistics. 4 (2): 109–132. doi:10.1515/jall.1982.4.2.109. hdl:1887/8809.
- Shosted, Ryan K. (2006). The Aeroacoustics of Nasalized Fricatives (PhD dissertation). University of California, Berkeley.
- Shosted, Ryan K. (2009). The Aeroacoustics of Nasalized Fricatives: An Instrumental Study in Phonetic Typology. Saarbrücken: VDM Verlag. ISBN 978-3-639-01199-9.
- Zsiga, Elizabeth C. (2013). The Sounds of Language: An Introduction to Phonetics and Phonology. Wiley-Blackwell. p. 129. ISBN 978-1-4051-9103-6.

Place →	Labial					Coronal										Dorsal					Laryngeal			
Manner ↓	Bilabial		Labiodental		Linguolabial		Dental		Alveolar		Postalveolar		Retroflex		(Alveolo-)palatal		Velar		Uvular		Pharyngeal/epiglottal		Glottal	
Nasal	m̥	m	ɱ̊	ɱ		n̼	n̪̊	n̪	n̥	n	n̠̊	n̠	ɳ̊	ɳ	ɲ̊	ɲ	ŋ̊	ŋ	ɴ̥	ɴ				
Plosive	p	b	p̪	b̪	t̼	d̼	t̪	d̪	t	d			ʈ	ɖ	c	ɟ	k	ɡ	q	ɢ	ʡ		ʔ	
Sibilant affricate							ts̪	dz̪	ts	dz	tʃ	dʒ	tʂ	dʐ	tɕ	dʑ								
Non-sibilant affricate	pɸ	bβ	p̪f	b̪v			tθ	dð	tɹ̝̊	dɹ̝	t̠ɹ̝̊	d̠ɹ̝			cç	ɟʝ	kx	ɡɣ	qχ	ɢʁ	ʡʜ	ʡʢ	ʔh	
Sibilant fricative							s̪	z̪	s	z	ʃ	ʒ	ʂ	ʐ	ɕ	ʑ								
Non-sibilant fricative	ɸ	β	f	v	θ̼	ð̼	θ	ð	θ̠	ð̠	ɹ̝̠̊	ɹ̠᷵	ɻ̥᷵	ɻ᷵	ç	ʝ	x	ɣ	χ	ʁ	ħ	ʕ	h	ɦ
Approximant		β̞		ʋ				ð̞		ɹ		ɹ̠		ɻ		j		ɰ						˷
Tap/flap		ⱱ̟		ⱱ					ɾ̥	ɾ			ɽ̊	ɽ						ɢ̆		ʡ̆		
Trill	ʙ̥	ʙ							r̥	r		r̠	ɽ̊r̥	ɽr					ʀ̥	ʀ	ʜ	ʢ		
Lateral affricate									tɬ	dɮ			tꞎ	d𝼅	c𝼆	ɟʎ̝	k𝼄	ɡʟ̝						
Lateral fricative							ɬ̪		ɬ	ɮ			ꞎ	𝼅	𝼆	ʎ̝	𝼄	ʟ̝						
Lateral approximant								l̪	l̥	l		l̠	ɭ̊	ɭ	ʎ̥	ʎ	ʟ̥	ʟ		ʟ̠				
Lateral tap/flap									ɺ̥	ɺ			𝼈̊	𝼈		ʎ̆		ʟ̆						

		BL	LD	D	A	PA	RF	P	V	U
Implosive	Voiced	ɓ			ɗ		ᶑ	ʄ	ɠ	ʛ
Implosive	Voiceless	ɓ̥			ɗ̥		ᶑ̊	ʄ̊	ɠ̊	ʛ̥
Ejective	Stop	pʼ			tʼ		ʈʼ	cʼ	kʼ	qʼ
Ejective	Affricate		p̪fʼ	tθʼ	tsʼ	tʃʼ	tʂʼ	tɕʼ	kxʼ	qχʼ
Ejective	Fricative	ɸʼ	fʼ	θʼ	sʼ	ʃʼ	ʂʼ	ɕʼ	xʼ	χʼ
Ejective	Lateral affricate				tɬʼ			c𝼆ʼ	k𝼄ʼ	q𝼄ʼ
Ejective	Lateral fricative				ɬʼ					
Click (top: velar; bottom: uvular)	Tenuis	kʘ qʘ		kǀ qǀ	kǃ qǃ		k𝼊 q𝼊	kǂ qǂ		
Click (top: velar; bottom: uvular)	Voiced	ɡʘ ɢʘ		ɡǀ ɢǀ	ɡǃ ɢǃ		ɡ𝼊 ɢ𝼊	ɡǂ ɢǂ		
Click (top: velar; bottom: uvular)	Nasal	ŋʘ ɴʘ		ŋǀ ɴǀ	ŋǃ ɴǃ		ŋ𝼊 ɴ𝼊	ŋǂ ɴǂ	ʞ	
Click (top: velar; bottom: uvular)	Tenuis lateral				kǁ qǁ					
Click (top: velar; bottom: uvular)	Voiced lateral				ɡǁ ɢǁ					
Click (top: velar; bottom: uvular)	Nasal lateral				ŋǁ ɴǁ					
