= Velic =

Velic may refer to:

- Velić, a South Slavic surname and toponym
- Velič, a Slovak surname
- velic, an older term equivalent to velopharyngeal

== See also ==
- velaric
