= Collateral ligament =

Collateral ligament can refer to:

- Lateral collateral ligament (disambiguation):
  - Fibular collateral ligament
  - Lateral collateral ligament of ankle joint
  - Radial collateral ligament of elbow joint
- Medial collateral ligament
- Collateral ligaments of interphalangeal articulations of foot
- Collateral ligaments of metatarsophalangeal articulations
- Ulnar collateral ligament of elbow joint
- Collateral ligaments of metacarpophalangeal articulations
