= Somkiat Chantra =

Thai motorcycle racer (born 1998)

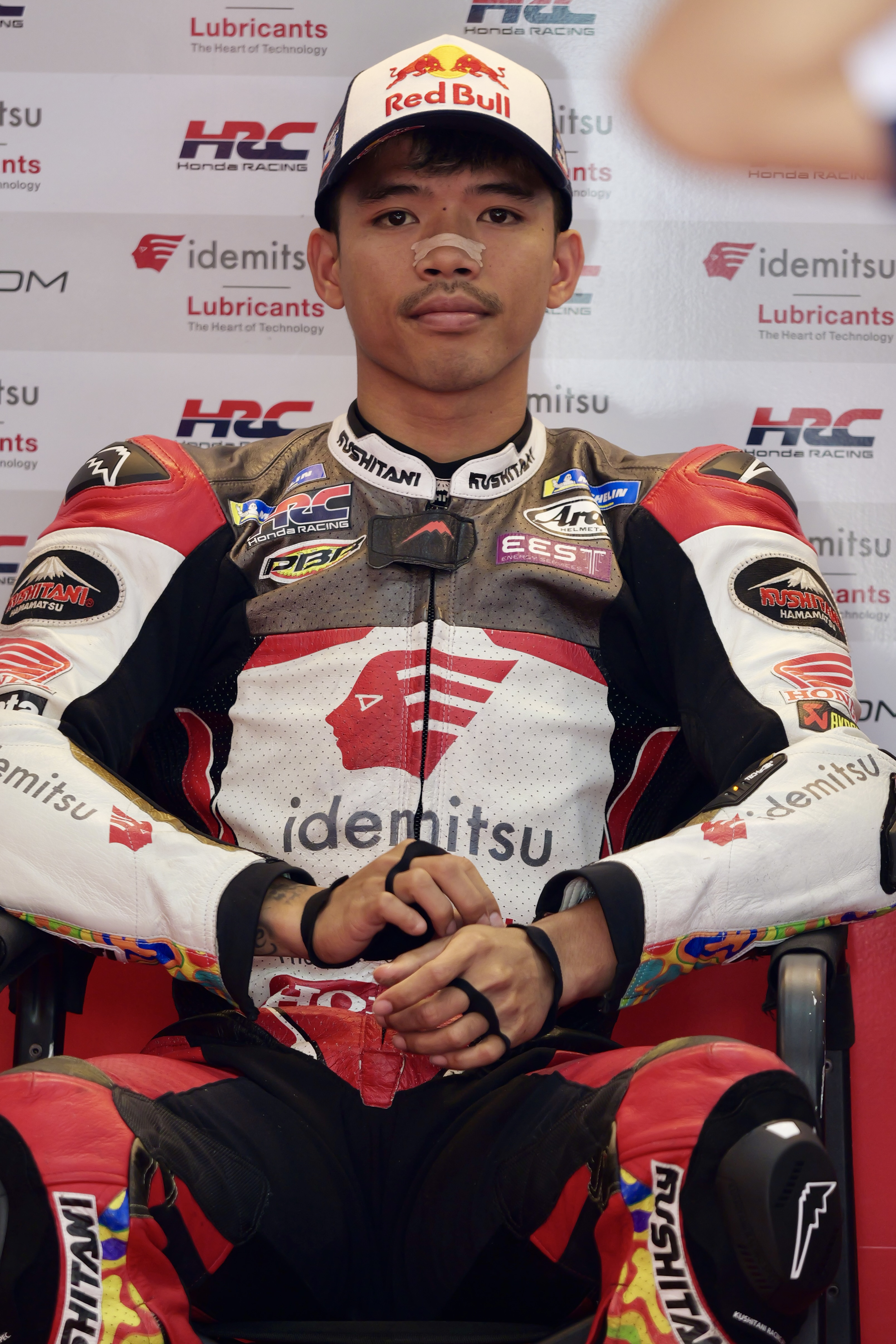
- Chantra at the 2025 Malaysian Grand Prix
- Nationality: Thai
- Born: 15 December 1998 (age 27); Pattaya, Chonburi, Thailand
- Current team: Honda HRC
- Bike number: 35
Motorcycle racing career statistics
MotoGP World Championship
Active years	2025–2026
Manufacturers	Honda
2025 championship position	26th (7 pts)
Starts / Wins / Podiums / Poles / F. laps / Points; 17 / 0 / 0 / 0 / 0 / 7
Moto2 World Championship
Active years	2019–2024
Manufacturers	Kalex
2024 championship position	12th (104 pts)
Starts / Wins / Podiums / Poles / F. laps / Points; 105 / 2 / 6 / 2 / 3 / 475.5
Moto3 World Championship
Active years	2018
Manufacturers	Honda
Championships	0
2018 championship position	33rd (7 pts)
Starts / Wins / Podiums / Poles / F. laps / Points; 1 / 0 / 0 / 0 / 0 / 7
Superbike World Championship
Active years	2026–
Manufacturers	Honda
Championships	0
2026 championship position	21st (23 pts)
Starts / Wins / Podiums / Poles / F. laps / Points; 30 / 0 / 0 / 0 / 0 / 23

Somkiat Chantra (Thai: สมเกียรติ จันทรา; born 15 December 1998) is a Thai motorcycle racer who is contracted to compete in the Superbike World Championship for Honda HRC. Chantra previously competed for Idemitsu Honda LCR during the 2025 MotoGP World Championship, becoming the first Thai rider to compete at the highest level of Grand Prix motorcycle racing. Chantra is also a two-time race winner in Moto2, in which he competed for Idemitsu Honda Team Asia between 2019 and 2024.

Chantra is the second Asia Talent Cup graduate to debut in MotoGP after Ai Ogura, both starting from the 2025 MotoGP season.

== Career ==
=== Early career ===
Coming through the Shell Advance Asia Talent Cup ranks, Chantra gained fame by becoming the champion in 2016. He competed in the 2017 FIM CEV Moto3 Junior World Championship, and qualified on pole position in the season opener, but crashed out of the race. He would finish eighth in Le Mans, 13th in Jerez, seventh in Aragon, and tenth in Valencia, finishing the season 20th overall, with 26 points. He stayed in the 2018 FIM CEV Moto3 Junior World Championship, and was a constant finisher in the high points scoring places, but could not score a podium, his season's best result a fourth place in France. He ended the year ninth in the standings, with 61 total points.

=== Moto3 World Championship ===
Chantra was given a wild-card race appearance as his debut in Grand Prix racing, in the 2018 Thailand motorcycle Grand Prix, his home GP. He seized his chance, crossing the line in ninth place, scoring a brilliant seven points, and earning himself a full-time ride for next season.

=== Moto2 World Championship ===
==== Idemitsu Honda Team Asia (2019–2024) ====
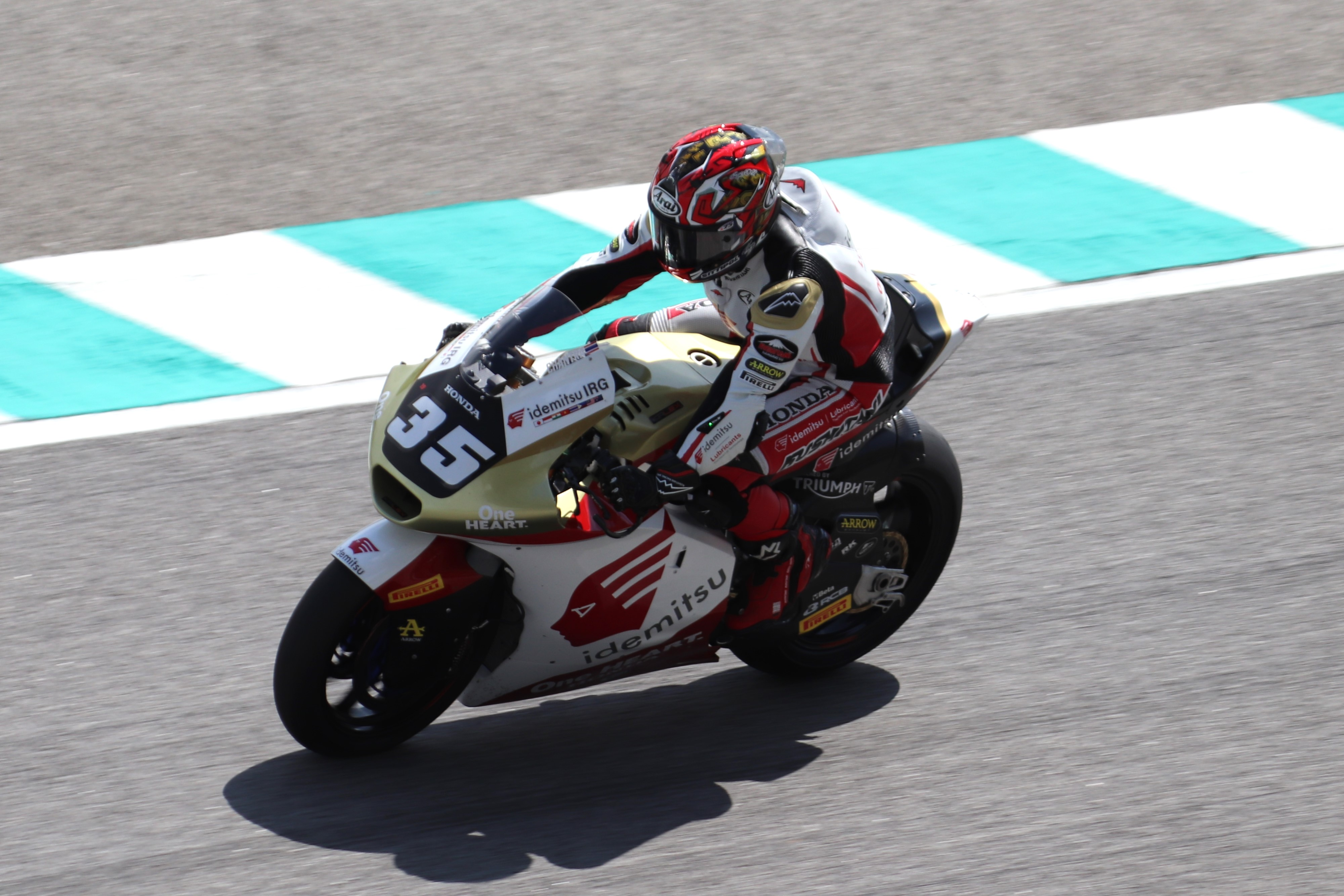
Chantra at the 2024 Malaysian Grand Prix

Riding for the newly formed Honda Asia Team in 2019, created specifically to give Asian riders a chance in Moto2 and Moto3, Chantra performed well as a rookie, scoring 23 points in the season, while his teammates Dimas Ekky Pratama, Andi Farid Izdihar, Teppei Nagoe, and Gerry Salim scored none.

Racing full time for Honda Asia Team again in 2020, Chantra struggled to reproduce what he did last season, scoring points in just two races, ending the season with ten points. His teammate was Izdihar for the whole year, who scored no points.

Chantra had a bounce-back 2021 season, and so did the Honda Asia Team. Chantra scored 37 points throughout the year, his highest finish coming in Austria, where rookie teammate Ai Ogura came in second place, and Chantra in fifth, scoring a season-high in points for the team.

=== MotoGP World Championship ===
==== LCR Honda (2025) ====
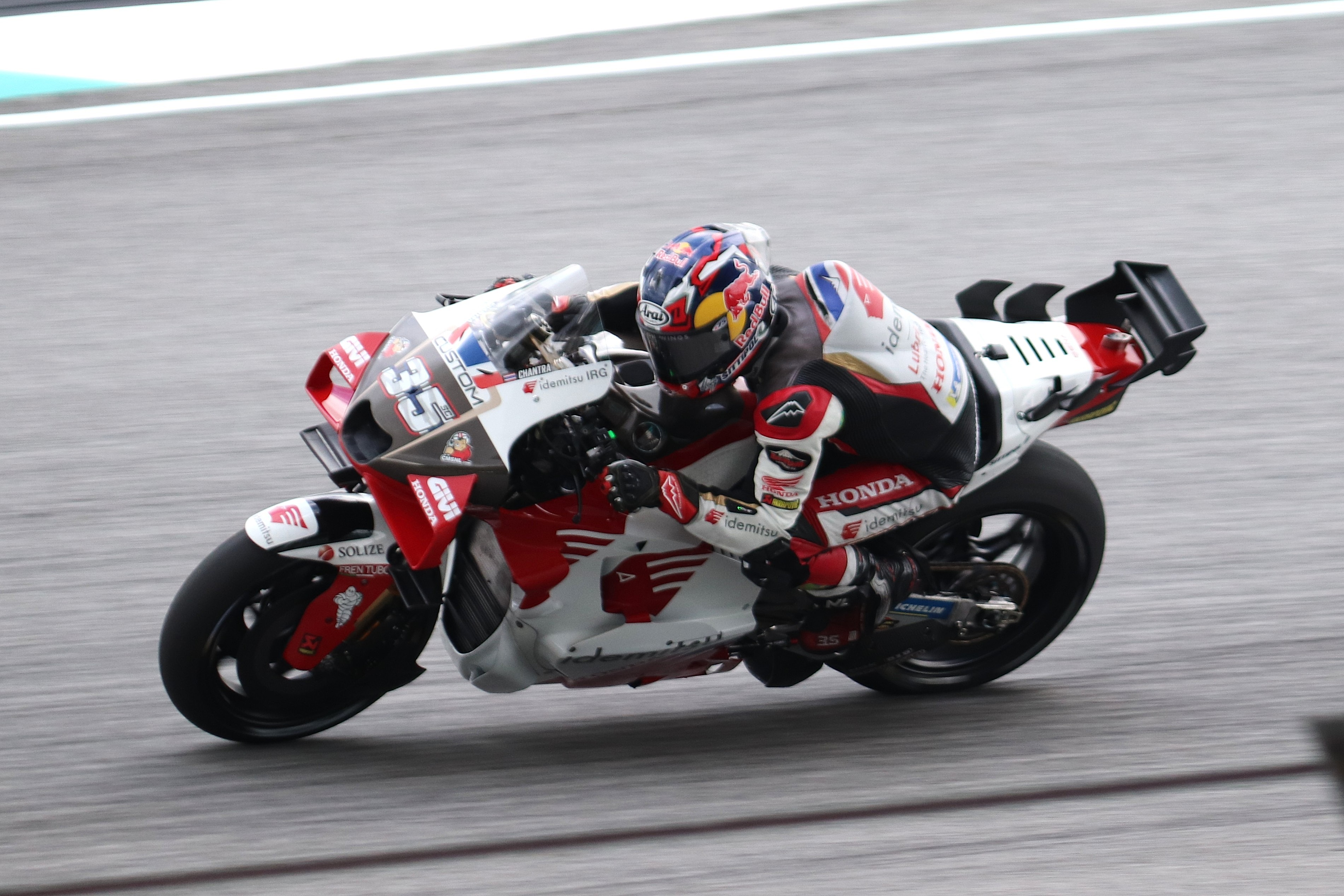
Chantra at the 2025 Malaysian Grand Prix

On 29 August 2024, it was announced that Chantra would replace Takaaki Nakagami in the LCR Honda squad for the 2025 MotoGP World Championship, being the first Thai rider ever to sign a MotoGP contract. Chantra struggled during the early races of 2025, and he was sidelined following the Spanish Grand Prix after an arm pump surgery. He suffered a collateral ligament injury in his right knee after off-road training on 1 July 2025. Subsequently, Chantra, who managed to score his first point at the Dutch TT, missed the German, Czech, and Austrian rounds of the championship.

At the end of September, Chantra was announced to be departing the team and MotoGP following the conclusion of the season, being replaced by Diogo Moreira.

==== Honda stand-in (2026) ====
For the Japanese Grand Prix, Chantra will make his MotoGP return with the Honda factory team, deputising for an unwell Joan Mir.

=== Superbike World Championship ===
==== Honda HRC (2026-) ====
On 30 September 2025, it was announced that Chantra would move to the Superbike World Championship with the Honda HRC team for the 2026 season alongside Jake Dixon.

Chantra will retain his seat at Honda for the 2027 season alongside Dixon.

== Career statistics ==
=== Asia Talent Cup ===
==== Races by year ====
(key) (Races in bold indicate pole position; races in italics indicate fastest lap)

Year	Bike	1	2	3	4	5	6	7	8	9	10	11	12	Pos	Pts
2014	Honda	QAT; 6	IDN; 11	CHN1; 18	CHN2; 15	MAL1; Ret	MAL2; 11	JAP; 6	MYS1; 10	MYS2; 4				11th	50
2015	Honda	THA1; 1	THA2; Ret	QAT1; 2	QAT2; 4	MAL1	MAL2	CHN1	CHN2	JPN1	JPN2	SEP1	SEP2	12th	61
2016	Honda	THA1; 4	THA2; 1	**QAT1**; 6	**QAT2**; 2	MAL1; 4	MAL2; 1	CHN1; 3	CHN2; 8	JPN1; 6	JPN2; 4	SEP1; Ret	SEP2; 1	1st	178

=== FIM CEV Moto3 Junior World Championship ===
==== Races by year ====
(key) (Races in bold indicate pole position, races in italics indicate fastest lap)

Year	Bike	1	2	3	4	5	6	7	8	9	10	11	12	Pos	Pts
2017	Honda	**ALB**; Ret	LMS; 8	CAT1	CAT2	VAL1	VAL2	EST	JER1; 13	JER1; 7	ARA; 17	VAL1; 16	VAL2; 10	20th	26
2018	Honda	EST; 9	VAL1; 6	VAL2; 5	FRA; 4	CAT1; 12	CAT2; 14	ARA; Ret	JER1; 12	JER2; Ret	ALB; 6	VAL1	VAL2	9th	61

=== Grand Prix motorcycle racing ===
==== By season ====
Season	Class	Motorcycle	Team	Race	Win	Podium	Pole	FLap	Pts	Plcd
2018	Moto3	Honda	AP Honda Racing Thailand	1	0	0	0	0	7	33rd
2019	Moto2	Kalex	Idemitsu Honda Team Asia	16	0	0	0	0	23	21st
2020	Moto2	Kalex	Idemitsu Honda Team Asia	15	0	0	0	0	10	25th
2021	Moto2	Kalex	Idemitsu Honda Team Asia	17	0	0	0	1	37	18th
2022	Moto2	Kalex	Idemitsu Honda Team Asia	19	1	4	1	1	128	10th
2023	Moto2	Kalex	Idemitsu Honda Team Asia	20	1	2	1	1	173.5	6th
2024	Moto2	Kalex	Idemitsu Honda Team Asia	18	0	0	0	0	104	12th
2025	MotoGP	Honda	LCR Honda Idemitsu	17	0	0	0	0	7	26th
2026	MotoGP	Honda	Honda HRC Castrol	0	0	0	0	0	0*	NC*
Total				**123**	**2**	**6**	**2**	**3**	**489.5**	

==== By class ====
Class	Seasons	1st GP	1st pod	1st win	Race	Win	Podiums	Pole	FLap	Pts	WChmp
Moto3	2018	2018 Thailand			1	0	0	0	0	7	0
Moto2	2019–2024	2019 Qatar	2022 Indonesia	2022 Indonesia	105	2	6	2	3	475.5	0
MotoGP	2025	2025 Thailand			17	0	0	0	0	7	0
Total	2018–2026				**123**	**2**	**6**	**2**	**3**	**489.5**	**0**

==== Races by year ====
(key) (Races in bold indicate pole position; races in italics indicate fastest lap)

Year	Class	Bike	1	2	3	4	5	6	7	8	9	10	11	12	13	14	15	16	17	18	19	20	21	22	Pos	Pts
2018	Moto3	Honda	QAT	ARG	AME	SPA	FRA	ITA	CAT	NED	GER	CZE	AUT	GBR	RSM	ARA	THA; 9	JPN	AUS	MAL	VAL				33rd	7
2019	Moto2	Kalex	QAT; Ret	ARG; 10	AME; 20	SPA; 17	FRA; Ret	ITA	CAT; 17	NED; DNS	GER	CZE; 15	AUT; 12	GBR; 16	RSM; 14	ARA; 16	THA; 9	JPN; 13	AUS; Ret	MAL; Ret	VAL; 23				21st	23
2020	Moto2	Kalex	QAT; 25	SPA; Ret	ANC; Ret	CZE; 23	AUT; 13	STY; Ret	RSM; 18	EMI; 21	CAT; Ret	FRA; 9	ARA; 23	TER; 19	EUR; Ret	VAL; 18	POR; 18								25th	10
2021	Moto2	Kalex	QAT; Ret	DOH; 19	POR; 21	SPA; Ret	FRA; 12	ITA; 18	CAT; 9	GER; 18	NED; 11	STY; 8	AUT; 5	GBR; 17	ARA; Ret	RSM; Ret	AME; 14	EMI; Ret	ALR; DSQ	VAL; 19					18th	37
2022	Moto2	Kalex	QAT; DNS	INA; 1	ARG; 2	AME; Ret	POR; Ret	SPA; Ret	FRA; 3	ITA; Ret	CAT; 12	GER; 15	NED; 13	GBR; 13	AUT; 2	RSM; 8	ARA; 7	JPN; 5	**THA**; Ret	AUS; 8	MAL; Ret	VAL; Ret			10th	128
2023	Moto2	Kalex	POR; 9	ARG; 8	AME; 11	SPA; 7	FRA; 6	ITA; 9	GER; 4	NED; Ret	GBR; 9	AUT; 5	CAT; 14	RSM; 6	IND; Ret	**JPN**; 1	INA; 7	AUS; 7^{‡}	THA; 3	MAL; 6	QAT; 7	VAL; 5			6th	173.5
2024	Moto2	Kalex	QAT; 11	POR; 10	AME; 21	SPA; 10	FRA; 5	CAT; Ret	ITA; 9	NED; 5	GER; 6	GBR; Ret	AUT; 8	ARA; 6	RSM; 14	EMI; 14	INA; Ret	JPN	AUS	THA; 4	MAL; 9	SLD; 10			12th	104
2025	MotoGP	Honda	THA; 18	ARG; 18	AME; 16	QAT; 18	SPA; Ret	FRA	GBR; 19	ARA; 16	ITA; 18	NED; 15	GER	CZE	AUT	HUN	CAT; 16	RSM; 15	JPN; 15	INA; 13	AUS; 17	MAL; 15	POR; 17	VAL; 17	26th	7
2026	MotoGP	Honda	THA	BRA	USA	SPA	FRA	CAT	ITA	HUN	CZE	NED	GER	GBR	ARA	RSM	AUT	JPN; 13	INA	AUS	MAL	QAT	POR	VAL	26th*	3*

^{‡} Half points awarded as less than half of the race distance (but at least three full laps) was completed.

=== Superbike World Championship ===
==== Races by season ====
Season	Motorcycle	Team	Race	Win	Podium	Pole	FLap	Pts	Plcd
2026	Honda CBR1000RR	Honda HRC	30	0	0	0	0	23	21st
Total			**30**	**0**	**0**	**0**	**0**	**23**	

==== Races by year ====
(key) (Races in bold indicate pole position; races in italics indicate fastest lap)

Year	Bike	1			2			3			4			5			6			7			8			9			10			11			12			Pos	Pts
Year	Bike	R1	SR	R2	R1	SR	R2	R1	SR	R2	R1	SR	R2	R1	SR	R2	R1	SR	R2	R1	SR	R2	R1	SR	R2	R1	SR	R2	R1	SR	R2	R1	SR	R2	R1	SR	R2	Pos	Pts
2026	Honda	AUS	AUS	AUS	POR; 18	POR; Ret	POR; 15	NED; WD	NED; WD	NED; WD	HUN; 19	HUN; 19	HUN; 15	CZE; 17	CZE; Ret	CZE; 18	ARA; 15	ARA; 18	ARA; 15	EMI; 15	EMI; 15	EMI; 13	GBR; 20	GBR; 18	GBR; Ret	FRA; Ret	FRA; 17	FRA; 14	ITA; 13	ITA; 13	ITA; 13	POR; 14	POR; 20	POR; 13	SPA; 16	SPA; 18	SPA; 14	21st	23

=== Suzuka 8 Hours ===
Year	Class	Team	Co-riders	Bike	Pos
2026	**EWC**	(Japan) Team HRC	(Japan) Takumi Takahashi (United Kingdom) Jonathan Rea	Honda CBR1000RR-R SP	1st
