= Kick (association football) =

Skill in association football

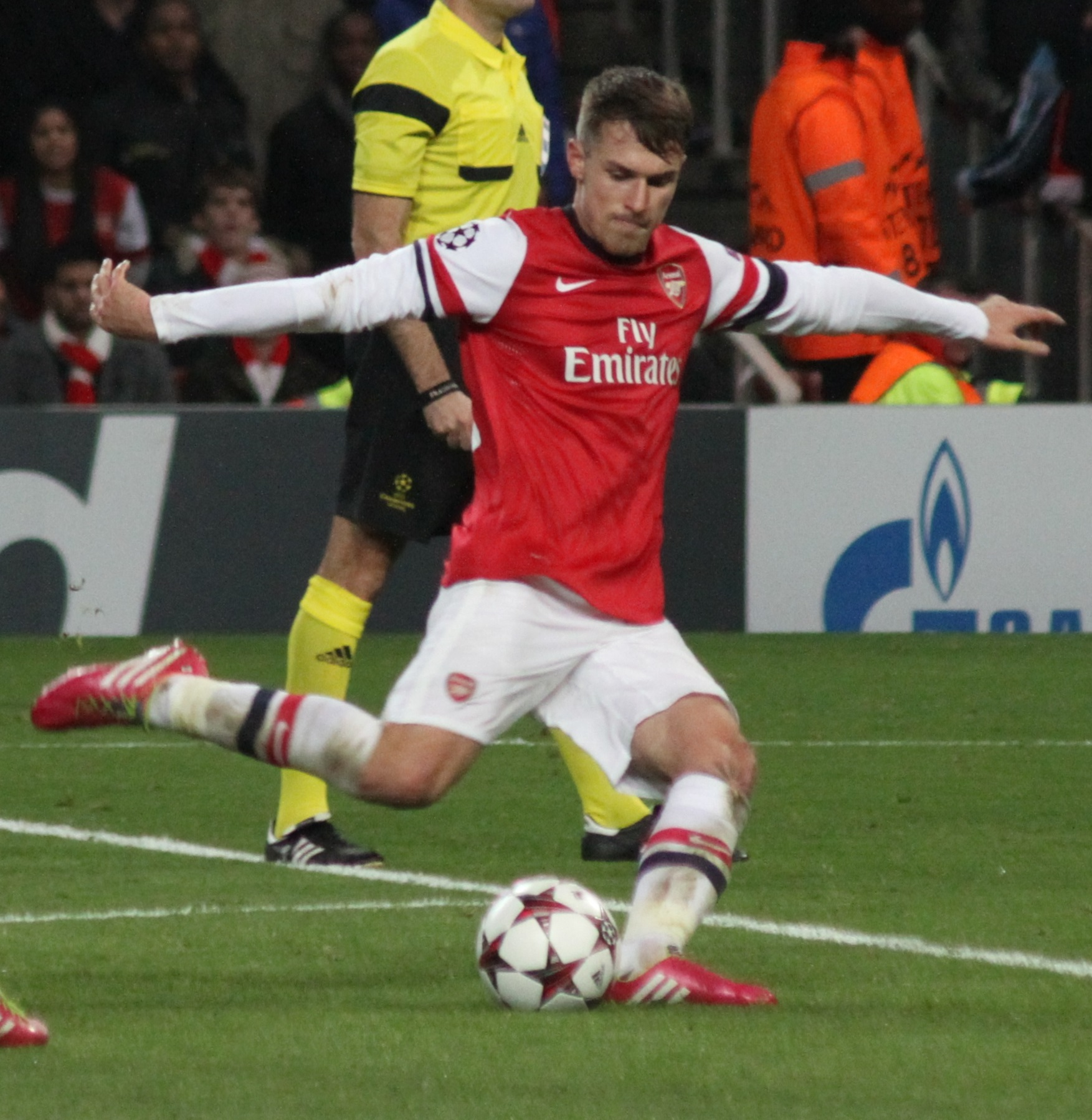
Aaron Ramsey of Arsenal kicking a football

A kick is a skill in association football in which a player strikes the ball with their foot. Association football, more commonly referred to as football and also known as soccer, is a sport played world-wide, with up to 265 million people around the world participating on a yearly basis. Kicking is one of the most difficult skills to acquire in football. This skill is also vitally important, as kicking is the way in which passes are made and the primary means by which goals are scored.

It has been observed that the time in which kicking skill develops most rapidly in the young football player is between the ages of 4 and 6 years old, with a consistent progression in ability up to the age of ten. This indicates that early participation in football can have long-term implications for the future ability level of the association football player. Greater accuracy and ability is seen in elite football players, likely due to the decreased mechanical variability in their form, highlighting the importance of practice in order to increase consistency in executing proper form. A kick becomes illegal when a player physically makes contact with the opponent in a dangerous way. If there is no illegal contact made, no matter how close it is it is completely legal.

== Technique ==
=== Approach ===
There are two main aspects of the kicking action to consider when developing the skills for an effective kick in football: power (velocity of the ball) and accuracy (trajectory of the ball). Multiple studies have concluded that a diagonal approach is more effective than a straight approach, with an approach angle close 45 degrees yielding the greatest power and ball velocity. Athletes with stronger and more accurate kicks and tend to put less energy into the approach (the steps taken before the kick) and more energy into the backswing and forward swing movements of the kick than do less skilled athletes. Therefore, less focus should be placed on the approach and more focus placed on developing effective kicking mechanics.

=== Visual focus ===
Visual focus should be placed on the ball, not on the football pitch. If lifting the head/eyes in order to determine where to shoot, which may be necessary in various circumstances, this should be done before taking the shot. The athlete’s vision should be focused directly at the ball through the entirety of the kicking action in order to increase accuracy.

=== Support (stance) leg ===
Just prior to the swing phase, the athlete should land on the supporting leg with the knee slightly flexed so as to absorb some of the impact and thereby stabilize the body for more effective motion of the kicking leg. The best position of the supporting leg has been found to be 5 to 10 cm to the side of the ball (left of the ball for a right-footed kicker, right of the ball for a left-footed kicker). Skilled athletes have a tendency toward a closer ball-to-support leg side position. For forward to back positioning, there is variability based on the desired action of the ball. Placing the support leg further behind the ball will produce a greater upward direction whereas placing the support leg closer to the ball will produce greater forward propulsion. Ball flight trajectory is dictated by the supporting foot’s position. The support foot should be positioned so as to be parallel to the intended direction of the ball. Other important body positioning to be aware of is to bend the upper body slightly forward over the ball.

=== Foot/ball contact ===
Velocity of the football is dependent on both the velocity of the foot upon contact as well as the quality of contact between the foot and the ball. The most effective way to transfer speed to the ball is to hit the ball at its center point with the upper portion of the foot, keeping the ankle firm.

== Motions and muscles ==
Lower body movement analysis and joint motions are important to learn because of the involvement in the kick. An in-step football kick involves a performer striking the football with the dorsal (top) part of the foot. The various lower body muscles that are required for this motion are also analyzed.

=== Movement analysis ===
Six distinct stages are involved in the kick: the approach angle, the plant foot force, the swing limb loading, the swinging phase, ball contact, and the follow through. The first is the “approach angle” when a kicker runs up to the ball. The second stage is the plant foot force, which involves situating the supporting foot at a distance lateral from the ball prior to kicking. The third stage is the swing limb loading that requires the preparation of the hip flexors and knee extensors to load or eccentrically stretch for forward movement in order for the swinging limb to strike the ball. It is also known as the backswing phase. The fourth stage is when the hip flexors and knee extensors initiate a forceful contraction in the swinging limb at a high velocity towards the ball. This stage is considered the swinging phase. The fifth stage is when the swinging foot makes complete contact with the ball. Lastly, once the foot makes impact, the kicker should try to keep their foot in contact with the ball as long as they can. This is possible by proceeding with the swing of the limb until ball is out of contact. This stage is also known as the follow through phase.

=== Joints ===
Joint motions are focused on the lower extremities; although there is recognition of upper body joint movements during the kick. Starting in stage 3, the kicking limb moves posterior of the positioned body, which is possible with hip extension. The hip is also adducted and externally rotated with knee flexion, knee internal rotation, and slight plantar flexion at the ankle joint on the kicking leg to prepare for impact with the ball. When the kicking foot comes into contact with the ball, hip goes into flexion, abduction, and external rotation with knee at a slight constant flexion. The pelvis rotates around the supporting limb by raising the thigh of the kicking limb forward. Forward motion is initiated by rotating the pelvis around the supporting leg and by bring the thigh of the kicking leg forwards while the knee continues to flex. During the last stages (stage 5 and 6) of the kick, the kicking foot exhibits plantar flexion at the ankle joint when coming into contact with the ball. Throughout each stage of the kick, the supporting limb knee is at a constant flexion. It is required to “absorb the impact of landing” and helps with reducing the forward motion. Once the kicking limb is near contact with the ball, the supporting knee initiates extension to stabilize the action. Prior to contact with the ball, there is a lateral flexion between the supporting limb and the trunk of the performer.

=== Muscles ===
Both the gluteus medius and gluteus maximus have greater activity in the kicking leg during the foot planting stage (Stage 2) preparing to raise the leg posterior of the body. During the backward swing in stage 3, the hamstrings (bicep femoris, semimembranosus, and semitendinosus) are activated to flex the knee and extend the hip in the swinging limb. Hamstrings are also activated in the supporting limb throughout the swinging stages until foot comes into contact with the ball to allow stabilization and balance. Stabilizer muscles, such as the gluteus medius and psoas, on the supporting limb are active to prevent the hip from adducting. As the kicking limb begins forward movement in stage 4, quadriceps, hip flexor muscles (iliopsoas), knee extensor muscles including the rectus femoris creates concentric activity to produce a fast forward velocity toward the ball by extending the knee and flexing the hip. During the swing stage prior to contact of the ball in stage 5, there is greater activation of the rectus femoris and the vastus medialis that may contribute to final knee extension speed. Also during the swinging limb stages, the gluteus medius has a greater activation in the supporting limb to allow rotation of the hip. In the follow-through phase (Stage 6), the gluteus maximus is activated in the kicking limb and during the leg cocking stage in the supporting limb to allow rotation of the hip. The gastrocnemius exhibited greatest muscle activity in the kicking leg during all stages of the motion, although it exhibited greatest muscle activity in the supporting limb in the swinging limb loading and the swinging limb stages (Stages 3 and 4, respectively), when the leg is cocked back and accelerates forward towards the ball.

== Targeted exercises for each muscle involved in a free kick ==
A football kick is the basic element of a game of association football. It is a multi-joint movement that involves coordination of primarily muscles of the leg and hip as well as other stabilizing and neutralizing muscles. A successful football kick requires a combination of power and accuracy and depending on the technique, it can either be powerful or accurate. A greater “swing phase” or foot speed will produce more power relying in force and speed, and the position of the “planted” foot and hip at impact will produce greater accuracy in the direction of the kick. Kicking performance can be improved by practicing and training soccer-specific strength exercises. This multi articular movement is executed by segmental and joint torques in multiple planes and produces and angular velocity generated from proximal to distal limbs. These are some exercises for each muscle involved in a free kick that will improve balance, force and speed. These are functional exercises that can be done on the field in practice.

=== Trunk ===
The muscles of the trunk stabilize the body before, during, and after impact with the ball during the kick (Major muscles involved; rectus abdominis, psoas major, and erector spinae muscles). The spider Crawl is a dynamic compound exercise that works mainly the core muscles such as rectus abdominis, erector spinae, and external obliques as well as the pectoralis major, anterior deltoids, and triceps. The spider crawl exercise aids in improving coordination by contra-laterally activating and coordinating the upper body with the lower body muscles. Moreover, crunches help to strengthen the rectus abdominis muscle and variations of planks engage the erector spinae and deeper back extensor muscles that aid in improving balance and posture. The superman exercise strengthens the lower back and improves flexibility in the lumbar region.

=== Hip ===
The hip involves flexion and internal rotation on the kicking leg side (tensor fasciae latae, rectus femoris, psoas major, iliacus, sartorius, pectineus, adductor brevis, longus, and magnus), and extension on the “planted” leg side (gluteus maximus, hamstring group and adductor magnus. The side lunge increases strength of the quadriceps muscles, gluteus maximus, and hip adductors & flexors. The side lunge improves balance by putting the body weight on the planted leg while trying to prevent falling back or forward. In addition, cariocas is an exercise in which the person moves laterally while facing forward by internally rotating the hip and stepping over with the leg contralateral to the direction of the movement. This exercise improves hip flexibility and agility by rotating the hip and stepping over quickly.

=== Legs ===
The hip extends and knee flexes during the loading of swing phase and then during the latter part of swing phase the leg flexes on the hip and knee extends while plantar flexing the ankle to kick the ball. (Quadriceps group, hamstrings group and plantar flexors). Jumping squats are a plyometric exercise that improves force, speed which equals power and explosiveness on the legs. Mountain climbers are a great way to improve endurance due to the duration and high intensity nature of the exercise. In addition, Nordic hamstring curls are important to reduce the development of muscle imbalance and prevent injuries because the hamstring muscles are often neglected and injured during an explosive movement such as the soccer kick. Most importantly, sprints will improve speed, force, agility, and endurance because it requires explosiveness and coordination of the body segments.

=== Upper body ===
The shoulder contralateral to the kicking leg is horizontally adducted and aids in counterbalancing the kick (anterior deltoid, biceps brachii, pectoralis major). For a football kick the upper body is not very active, but keeping a balance between the upper and lower body will reduce the torques created by forces of other segments.
