= Velopharyngeal =

Velopharyngeal may refer to:

- Velopharyngeal port, the opening between the oral and nasal cavities
- Velopharyngeal consonant, a consonant articulated at the velopharyngeal port
- Velopharyngeal insufficiency, a structural disorder affecting velopharyngeal closure
- Velopharyngeal inadequacy, impaired function of the velopharyngeal mechanism

== See also ==
- Velic trill
