= 2022 Argentine Republic motorcycle Grand Prix =

Third round of the 2022 Grand Prix motorcycle racing season

(Argentina) 2022 Argentine Republic Grand Prix
Race details
- Race 3 of 20 races in the 2022 Grand Prix motorcycle racing season
- Date: 3 April 2022
- Official name: Gran Premio Michelin de la República Argentina
- Location: Autódromo Termas de Río Hondo; Termas de Río Hondo, Argentina
- Course: Permanent racing facility; 4.806 km (2.986 mi)

MotoGP
Pole position
Rider	(Spain) Aleix Espargaró	Aprilia
Time	1:37.688	
Fastest lap
Rider	(Spain) Aleix Espargaró	Aprilia
Time	1:39.375 on lap 11	
Podium
First	(Spain) Aleix Espargaró	Aprilia
Second	(Spain) Jorge Martín	Ducati
Third	(Spain) Álex Rins	Suzuki

Moto2
Pole position
Rider	(Spain) Fermín Aldeguer	Boscoscuro
Time	1:43.306	
Fastest lap
Rider	(Italy) Celestino Vietti	Kalex
Time	1:42.829 on lap 3	
Podium
First	(Italy) Celestino Vietti	Kalex
Second	(Thailand) Somkiat Chantra	Kalex
Third	(Japan) Ai Ogura	Kalex

Moto3
Pole position
Rider	(Spain) Sergio García	Gas Gas
Time	1:48.429	
Fastest lap
Rider	(Italy) Andrea Migno	Honda
Time	1:48.834 on lap 5	
Podium
First	(Spain) Sergio García	Gas Gas
Second	(Italy) Dennis Foggia	Honda
Third	(Japan) Ayumu Sasaki	Husqvarna

The 2022 Argentine Republic motorcycle Grand Prix (officially known as the Gran Premio Michelin de la República Argentina) was the third round of the 2022 Grand Prix motorcycle racing season. It was held at the Autódromo Termas de Río Hondo in Termas de Río Hondo on 3 April 2022.

In the MotoGP race, Aleix Espargaró won the race on his 200th MotoGP appearance after starting from pole position to take his and Aprilia's both maiden pole and victory in the premier class.

== Background ==
The race returned after the cancellation of the 2020 and 2021 editions as a response to the COVID-19 pandemic.

=== Logistical issues ===
The race weekend program underwent a change due to logistical difficulties affecting freight transport. Five cargo flights were supposed to ship paddock material from Lombok, Indonesia, to Tucuman, near Termas de Rio Hondo in Argentina, in the week following the Indonesian GP. Due to two separate issues affecting two different flights, the final cargo for the Argentine GP arrived in the country on Friday. The trip from Lombok to Termas consisted of five flights. Three of the planned cargo routes carried cargo from Lombok to Tucuman via technical stops in Mombasa, Lagos and Brazil. The other two routes involved the transport of goods from Lombok to Doha, from Doha to Accra in Ghana and then to Tucuman. The difficulties began on Wednesday when one of the five planes encountered a problem during a technical stop in Mombasa, Kenya. The first plane that had already arrived in Tucuman was then brought back to Lombok to collect more cargo, but this too suffered a technical problem during a layover the previous Wednesday evening. On the morning of the Thursday before the weekend, local time in Argentina, a cargo remained ashore in Mombasa, Kenya. The plane waited for a part to fly back, with two parts - one shipped from Europe and another part in reserve, shipped from the Middle East - already en route. The plane took off Thursday evening and followed the route from Mombasa via Lagos and Brazil, arriving in Tucuman on Friday.

The Friday practice sessions were canceled. On Saturday morning there were two free practice sessions for all classes whose combined rankings counted as entrance to Q2. The MotoGP class initially had a third free practice session planned before qualifying, but was later canceled. Qualifying was held in the afternoon but with a postponement of the start times. Warm Up sessions on Sunday morning were extended, with each race set to begin at the same start time as originally scheduled.

=== Riders' entries ===
In MotoGP class, Marc Márquez was absent in this Grand Prix due to the new diplopia episode which occurred due to the fall in the warm up during the Indonesian Grand Prix. Honda test rider Stefan Bradl took his place. Takaaki Nakagami was initially declared absent in this Grand Prix due to the positivity of the COVID-19 test and therefore unable to start. Following the postponement of the racing program and a new test to which he tested negative, he left for Argentina and was therefore available. In Moto2 class, Barry Baltus was out for the weekend with a broken right wrist remedied during qualifying for the Indonesian Grand Prix. The RW Racing GP team decided not to replace him. In Moto3 class, Taiyo Furusato recovered from his right ankle injury; the 2021 Asia Talent Cup champion thus made his debut in the class. As already happened in the first two stages, Gerard Riu replaced David Muñoz because the latter was still under the limit minimum age to run in the category. John McPhee does not race in this race (as in the Indonesian Grand Prix) after sustaining two fractured vertebrae during training. He was not replaced.

=== MotoGP Championship standings before the race ===
After the Indonesian Grand Prix, Enea Bastianini kept the lead of the riders' standings with 30 points, two more than Brad Binder and three more than Fabio Quartararo. The 25 points gained by Miguel Oliveira following the victory of the previous race, allowed him to move up to fourth position, followed by only one point by Johann Zarco. In the constructors' classification, KTM overtook Ducati (45 points against 41). Yamaha was third with 27 points, followed by Suzuki at 20 points, one more than Honda and Aprilia. In the team championship standings, Red Bull KTM Factory Racing took the lead with 53 points, followed by Monster Energy Yamaha MotoGP and Team Suzuki Ecstar at 12 and 13 points respectively. Repsol Honda Team was fifth with 31 points, one more than Gresini Racing MotoGP.

=== Moto2 Championship standings before the race ===
Celestino Vietti lead the riders' standings with 45 points, followed by Arón Canet and Sam Lowes with 36 and 29 points respectively. Somkiat Chantra, with his first career victory in Indonesia, climbed the ranking by 26 positions and was fourth with 25 points, one point more than Augusto Fernández. The constructors' classification saw the Kalex at 50 points, while Boscoscuro had 10 points. In the team championship standings, Flexbox HP40 and Elf Marc VDS Racing Team were tied on points with 48 points, three more than Idemitsu Honda Team Asia and Mooney VR46 Racing Team. Red Bull KTM Ajo is fifth with 35 points.

=== Moto3 Championship standings before the race ===
The riders' classification saw Dennis Foggia, winner of the previous race, take the lead with 34 points, only one point ahead of Sergio García. Izan Guevara was third at 28 points, with Andrea Migno and Deniz Öncü following with 25 and points respectively. In the constructors' classification, Honda had full points with 50 points, with a 10-point advantage over Gas Gas. KTM and CFMoto were third (27 points) and fourth (22 points), while Husqvarna closed the ranking with 11 points. The ranking of the team championship had Gaviota GasGas Aspar Team as leader with 61 points; second was Leopard Racing with 40 points, 8 more than CFMoto Racing Prüstel GP, 14 from Red Bull KTM Tech3 and 15 from Rivacold Snipers Team.

== Free practice ==
=== MotoGP ===
In the first session, Takaaki Nakagami was the fastest, followed by Fabio Quartararo and Pol Espargaró. In the second session, Aleix Espargaró finished in the lead ahead of teammate Maverick Viñales and Jack Miller.

=== Combined Free Practice 1 and 2 ===
The top ten riders (written in bold) qualified in Q2.

Fastest session lap

Pos.	No.	Biker	Constructor	Free practice times	
Pos.	No.	Biker	Constructor	FP1	FP2
1	41	**(Spain) Aleix Espargaró**	**Aprilia**	1:39.224	**1:38.244**
2	12	**(Spain) Maverick Viñales**	**Aprilia**	1:39.396	**1:38.454**
3	43	**(Australia) Jack Miller**	**Ducati**	1:39.899	**1:38.463**
4	20	**(France) Fabio Quartararo**	**Yamaha**	1:39.155	**1:38.471**
5	33	**(South Africa) Brad Binder**	**KTM**	1:39.425	**1:38.548**
6	42	**(Spain) Álex Rins**	**Suzuki**	1:39.274	**1:38.619**
7	36	**(Spain) Joan Mir**	**Suzuki**	1:39.427	**1:38.626**
8	89	**(Spain) Jorge Martín**	**Ducati**	1:40.182	**1:38.704**
9	5	**(France) Johann Zarco**	**Ducati**	1:39.802	**1:38.797**
10	10	**(Italy) Luca Marini**	**Ducati**	1:39.830	**1:38.915**
11	88	(Portugal) Miguel Oliveira	KTM	1:39.318	**1:38.924**
12	63	(Italy) Francesco Bagnaia	Ducati	1:39.622	**1:38.943**
13	30	(Japan) Takaaki Nakagami	Honda	1:39.028	**1:38.951**
14	21	(Italy) Franco Morbidelli	Yamaha	1:39.960	**1:38.959**
15	72	(Italy) Marco Bezzecchi	Ducati	1:39.230	**1:38.973**
16	33	(Italy) Enea Bastianini	Ducati	1:39.589	**1:38.915**
17	44	(Spain) Pol Espargaró	Honda	1:39.223	**1:39.178**
18	87	(Australia) Remy Gardner	KTM	1:39.704	**1:39.503**
19	73	(Spain) Álex Márquez	Honda	1:39.756	**1:39.553**
20	25	(Spain) Raúl Fernández	KTM	1:40.474	**1:39.600**
21	4	(Italy) Andrea Dovizioso	Yamaha	1:40.721	**1:39.749**
22	6	(Germany) Stefan Bradl	Honda	1:40.346	**1:39.940**
23	49	(Italy) Fabio Di Giannantonio	Ducati	**1:40.004**	1:40.040
24	40	(South Africa) Darryn Binder	Yamaha	1:40.293	**1:40.078**
OFFICIAL MOTOGP COMBINED FREE PRACTICE TIMES REPORT

== Qualifying ==
=== MotoGP ===
Fastest session lap

Pos.	No.	Biker	Constructor	Qualifying times		Final grid	Row
Pos.	No.	Biker	Constructor	Q1	Q2	Final grid	Row
1	41	(Spain) Aleix Espargaró	Aprilia	Qualified in Q2	1:37.688	1	1
2	89	(Spain) Jorge Martín	Ducati	Qualified in Q2	1:37.839	2	1
3	10	(Italy) Luca Marini	Ducati	Qualified in Q2	1:38.119	3	1
4	44	(Spain) Pol Espargaró	Honda	1:38.501	1:38.165	4	2
5	12	(Spain) Maverick Viñales	Aprilia	Qualified in Q2	1:38.196	5	2
6	20	(France) Fabio Quartararo	Yamaha	Qualified in Q2	1:38.281	6	2
7	44	(Spain) Álex Rins	Suzuki	Qualified in Q2	1:38.455	7	3
8	36	(Spain) Joan Mir	Suzuki	Qualified in Q2	1:38.516	8	3
9	5	(France) Johann Zarco	Ducati	Qualified in Q2	1:38.537	9	3
10	30	(Japan) Takaaki Nakagami	Honda	1:38.523	1:38.576	10	4
11	43	(Australia) Jack Miller	Ducati	Qualified in Q2	1:38.584	14	5
12	33	(South Africa) Brad Binder	KTM	Qualified in Q2	1:38.932	11	4
13	23	(Italy) Enea Bastianini	Ducati	1:38.566	N/A	12	4
14	63	(Italy) Francesco Bagnaia	Ducati	1:38.610	N/A	13	5
15	21	(Italy) Franco Morbidelli	Yamaha	1:38.805	N/A	15	5
16	88	(Portugal) Miguel Oliveira	KTM	1:38.871	N/A	16	6
17	72	(Italy) Marco Bezzecchi	Ducati	1:38.877	N/A	17	6
18	4	(Italy) Andrea Dovizioso	Yamaha	1:38.938	N/A	18	6
19	73	(Spain) Álex Márquez	Honda	1:39.095	N/A	19	7
20	49	(Italy) Fabio Di Giannantono	Ducati	1:39.126	N/A	20	7
21	25	(Spain) Raúl Fernández	KTM	1:39.153	N/A	21	7
22	87	(Australia) Remy Gardner	KTM	1:39.159	N/A	22	8
23	40	(South Africa) Darryn Binder	Yamaha	1:39.380	N/A	23	8
24	6	(Germany) Stefan Bradl	Honda	1:39.487	N/A	24	8
OFFICIAL MOTOGP QUALIFYING RESULTS

=== Moto2 ===
Fastest session lap

Pos.	No.	Biker	Constructor	Qualifying times		Final grid	Row
Pos.	No.	Biker	Constructor	Q1	Q2	Final grid	Row
1	54	(Spain) Fermín Aldeguer	Boscoscuro	Qualified in Q2	1:43.306	1	1
2	37	(Spain) Augusto Fernández	Kalex	Qualified in Q2	1:43.456	2	1
3	14	(Italy) Tony Arbolino	Kalex	Qualified in Q2	1:43.513	3	1
4	75	(Spain) Albert Arenas	Kalex	Qualified in Q2	1:43.615	4	2
5	96	(United Kingdom) Jake Dixon	Kalex	Qualified in Q2	1:43.622	5	2
6	13	(Italy) Celestino Vietti	Kalex	Qualified in Q2	1:43.645	6	2
7	35	(Thailand) Somkiat Chantra	Kalex	Qualified in Q2	1:43.671	7	3
8	79	(Japan) Ai Ogura	Kalex	Qualified in Q2	1:43.710	8	3
9	64	(Netherlands) Bo Bendsneyder	Kalex	Qualified in Q2	1:43.727	9	3
10	18	(Spain) Manuel González	Kalex	1:44.156	1:43.761	10	4
11	22	(United Kingdom) Sam Lowes	Kalex	Qualified in Q2	1:43.787	11	4
12	40	(Spain) Arón Canet	Kalex	Qualified in Q2	1:43.810	12	4
13	9	(Spain) Jorge Navarro	Kalex	Qualified in Q2	1:43.839	13	5
14	84	(Netherlands) Zonta van der Goorbergh	Kalex	1:44.185	1:44.068	14	5
15	16	(United States) Joe Roberts	Kalex	Qualified in Q2	1:44.189	15	5
16	6	(United States) Cameron Beaubier	Kalex	1:44.132	1:44.189	16	6
17	51	(Spain) Pedro Acosta	Kalex	Qualified in Q2	1:44.205	17	6
18	23	(Germany) Marcel Schrötter	Kalex	1:44.199	1:44.554	18	6
19	19	(Italy) Lorenzo Dalla Porta	Kalex	1:42.244	N/A	19	7
20	2	(Argentina) Gabriel Rodrigo	Kalex	1:44.390	N/A	20	7
21	24	(Italy) Simone Corsi	MV Agusta	1:44.431	N/A	21	7
22	42	(Spain) Marcos Ramírez	MV Agusta	1:44.445	N/A	22	8
23	12	(Czech Republic) Filip Salač	Kalex	1:44.501	N/A	23	8
24	28	(Italy) Niccolò Antonelli	Kalex	1:44.521	N/A	24	8
25	52	(Spain) Jeremy Alcoba	Kalex	1:44.652	N/A	25	9
26	5	(Italy) Romano Fenati	Boscoscuro	1:44.671	N/A	26	9
27	4	(United States) Sean Dylan Kelly	Kalex	1:44.798	N/A	27	9
28	61	(Italy) Alessandro Zaccone	Kalex	1:44.798	N/A	28	10
29	81	(Thailand) Keminth Kubo	Kalex	1:44.876	N/A	29	10
OFFICIAL MOTO2 QUALIFYING RESULTS

=== Moto3 ===
Fastest session lap

Pos.	No.	Biker	Constructor	Qualifying times		Final grid	Row
Pos.	No.	Biker	Constructor	Q1	Q2	Final grid	Row
1	11	(Spain) Sergio García	Gas Gas	Qualified in Q2	1:48.429	1	1
2	71	(Japan) Ayumu Sasaki	Husqvarna	Qualified in Q2	1:48.600	2	1
3	28	(Spain) Izan Guevara	Gas Gas	Qualified in Q2	1:48.624	3	1
4	54	(Italy) Riccardo Rossi	Honda	1:49.919	1:48.726	4	2
5	66	(Australia) Joel Kelso	KTM	1:49.980	1:48.735	5	2
6	96	(Spain) Daniel Holgado	KTM	Qualified in Q2	1:48.865	6	2
7	43	(Spain) Xavier Artigas	CFMoto	Qualified in Q2	1:48.943	7	3
8	16	(Italy) Andrea Migno	Honda	Qualified in Q2	1:48.953	8	3
9	24	(Japan) Tatsuki Suzuki	Honda	Qualified in Q2	1:49.050	9	3
10	10	(Brazil) Diogo Moreira	KTM	Qualified in Q2	1:49.061	10	4
11	7	(Italy) Dennis Foggia	Honda	Qualified in Q2	1:49.128	11	4
12	5	(Spain) Jaume Masià	KTM	Qualified in Q2	1:49.186	12	4
13	27	(Japan) Kaito Toba	KTM	Qualified in Q2	1:49.376	13	5
14	6	(Japan) Ryusei Yamanaka	KTM	1:49.822	1:49.400	14	5
15	48	(Spain) Iván Ortolá	KTM	Qualified in Q2	1:49.435	15	5
16	53	(Turkey) Deniz Öncü	KTM	Qualified in Q2	1:49.531	16	6
17	82	(Italy) Stefano Nepa	KTM	1:49.899	1:44.205	17	6
18	99	(Spain) Carlos Tatay	CFMoto	Qualified in Q2	1:49.724	18	6
19	19	(United Kingdom) Scott Ogden	Honda	1:50.094	N/A	19	7
20	64	(Indonesia) Mario Aji	Honda	1:50.104	N/A	20	7
21	23	(Italy) Elia Bartolini	KTM	1:50.138	N/A	21	7
22	72	(Japan) Taiyo Furusato	Honda	1:50.209	N/A	22	8
23	31	(Spain) Adrián Fernández	KTM	1:50.229	N/A	23	8
24	18	(Italy) Matteo Bertelle	KTM	1:50.423	N/A	24	8
25	67	(Italy) Alberto Surra	Honda	1:50.544	N/A	25	9
26	20	(France) Lorenzo Fellon	Honda	1:50.740	N/A	26	9
27	22	(Spain) Ana Carrasco	KTM	1:51.031	N/A	27	9
28	87	(Spain) Gerard Riu	KTM	1:51.128	N/A	28	10
29	70	(United Kingdom) Joshua Whatley	Honda	1:53.108	N/A	29	10
OFFICIAL MOTO3 QUALIFYING RESULTS

== Race ==
=== MotoGP ===
Pos.	No.	Rider	Team	Manufacturer	Laps	Time/Retired	Grid	Points
1	41	(Spain) Aleix Espargaró	Aprilia Racing	Aprilia	25	41:36.198	1	25
2	89	(Spain) Jorge Martín	Pramac Racing	Ducati	25	+0.807	2	20
3	42	(Spain) Álex Rins	Team Suzuki Ecstar	Suzuki	25	+1.330	7	16
4	36	(Spain) Joan Mir	Team Suzuki Ecstar	Suzuki	25	+1.831	8	13
5	63	(Italy) Francesco Bagnaia	Ducati Lenovo Team	Ducati	25	+5.840	13	11
6	33	(South Africa) Brad Binder	Red Bull KTM Factory Racing	KTM	25	+6.192	11	10
7	12	(Spain) Maverick Viñales	Aprilia Racing	Aprilia	25	+6.540	5	9
8	20	(France) Fabio Quartararo	Monster Energy Yamaha MotoGP	Yamaha	25	+10.215	6	8
9	72	(Italy) Marco Bezzecchi	Mooney VR46 Racing Team	Ducati	25	+12.622	17	7
10	23	(Italy) Enea Bastianini	Gresini Racing MotoGP	Ducati	25	+12.987	12	6
11	10	(Italy) Luca Marini	Mooney VR46 Racing Team	Ducati	25	+13.962	3	5
12	30	(Japan) Takaaki Nakagami	LCR Honda Idemitsu	Honda	25	+14.002	10	4
13	88	(Portugal) Miguel Oliveira	Red Bull KTM Factory Racing	KTM	25	+14.456	16	3
14	43	(Australia) Jack Miller	Ducati Lenovo Team	Ducati	25	+14.898	14	2
15	73	(Spain) Álex Márquez	LCR Honda Castrol	Honda	25	+23.472	19	1
16	25	(Spain) Raúl Fernández	Tech3 KTM Factory Racing	KTM	25	+25.862	21	
17	87	(Australia) Remy Gardner	Tech3 KTM Factory Racing	KTM	25	+28.711	22	
18	40	(South Africa) Darryn Binder	WithU Yamaha RNF MotoGP Team	Yamaha	25	+28.784	23	
19	6	(Germany) Stefan Bradl	Repsol Honda Team	Honda	25	+31.943	24	
20	4	(Italy) Andrea Dovizioso	WithU Yamaha RNF MotoGP Team	Yamaha	22	+3 laps	18	
Ret	49	(Italy) Fabio Di Giannantonio	Gresini Racing MotoGP	Ducati	22	Accident	20	
Ret	44	(Spain) Pol Espargaró	Repsol Honda Team	Honda	14	Accident	4	
Ret	21	(Italy) Franco Morbidelli	Monster Energy Yamaha MotoGP	Yamaha	7	Puncture	15	
Ret	5	(France) Johann Zarco	Pramac Racing	Ducati	5	Accident	9	
Fastest lap: (Spain) Aleix Espargaró (Aprilia) – 1:39.375 (lap 11)

=== Moto2 ===
Pos.	No.	Biker	Constructor	Laps	Time/Retired	Grid	Points
1	13	(Italy) Celestino Vietti	Kalex	23	39:44.098	6	25
2	35	(Thailand) Somkiat Chantra	Kalex	23	+1.538	7	20
3	79	(Japan) Ai Ogura	Kalex	23	+5.703	8	16
4	40	(Spain) Arón Canet	Kalex	23	+5.880	12	13
5	96	(United Kingdom) Jake Dixon	Kalex	23	+6.584	5	11
6	14	(Italy) Tony Arbolino	Kalex	23	+7.538	3	10
7	51	(Spain) Pedro Acosta	Kalex	23	+12.177	17	9
8	75	(Spain) Albert Arenas	Kalex	23	+12.418	4	8
9	64	(Netherlands) Bo Bendsneyder	Kalex	23	+13.656	9	7
10	22	(United Kingdom) Sam Lowes	Kalex	23	+14.254	11	6
11	6	(United States) Cameron Beaubier	Kalex	23	+20.077	16	5
12	23	(Germany) Marcel Schrötter	Kalex	23	+25.736	18	4
13	16	(United States) Joe Roberts	Kalex	23	+28.317	15	3
14	18	(Spain) Manuel González	Kalex	23	+29.784	10	2
15	42	(Spain) Marcos Ramírez	MV Agusta	23	+30.270	22	1
16	52	(Spain) Jeremy Alcoba	Kalex	23	+37.884	25	
17	24	(Italy) Simone Corsi	MV Agusta	23	+37.956	21	
18	5	(Italy) Romano Fenati	Boscoscuro	23	+38.325	26	
19	81	(Thailand) Keminth Kubo	Kalex	23	+1:04.858	29	
Ret	9	(Spain) Jorge Navarro	Kalex	20	Accident	13	
Ret	19	(Italy) Lorenzo Dalla Porta	Kalex	20	Accident	19	
Ret	2	(Argentina) Gabriel Rodrigo	Kalex	19	Accident	20	
Ret	12	(Czech Republic) Filip Salač	Kalex	11	Accident	23	
Ret	61	(Italy) Alessandro Zaccone	Kalex	7	Mechanical	28	
Ret	54	(Spain) Fermín Aldeguer	Boscoscuro	6	Accident	1	
Ret	84	(Netherlands) Zonta van den Goorbergh	Kalex	1	Accident	14	
Ret	37	(Spain) Augusto Fernández	Kalex	0	Accident	2	
Ret	28	(Italy) Niccolò Antonelli	Kalex	0	Collision	24	
Ret	4	(United States) Sean Dylan Kelly	Kalex	0	Collision	27	
Fastest lap: (Italy) Celestino Vietti (Kalex) – 1:42.829 (lap 3)
OFFICIAL MOTO2 RACE REPORT

=== Moto3 ===
Pos.	No.	Biker	Constructor	Laps	Time/Retired	Grid	Points
1	11	(Spain) Sergio García	Gas Gas	21	38:23.433	1	25
2	7	(Italy) Dennis Foggia	Honda	21	+0.146	11	20
3	71	(Japan) Ayumu Sasaki	Husqvarna	21	+0.375	2	16
4	54	(Italy) Riccardo Rossi	Honda	21	+0.507	4	13
5 (Note: One-position penalty for exceeding track limits on the last lap.)	24	(Japan) Tatsuki Suzuki	Honda	21	+0.484	9	11
6	10	(Brazil) Diogo Moreira	KTM	21	+0.587	10	10
7	96	(Spain) Daniel Holgado	KTM	21	+0.715	6	9
8	99	(Spain) Carlos Tatay	CFMoto	21	+2.032	18	8
9	27	(Japan) Kaito Toba	KTM	21	+3.098	13	7
10	66	(Australia) Joel Kelso	KTM	21	+3.397	5	6
11	23	(Italy) Elia Bartolini	KTM	21	+7.649	21	5
12	6	(Japan) Ryusei Yamanaka	KTM	21	+8.893	14	4
13	31	(Spain) Adrián Fernández	KTM	21	+9.032	23	3
14	53	(Turkey) Deniz Öncü	KTM	21	+9.202	16	2
15	48	(Spain) Iván Ortolá	KTM	21	+9.449	15	1
16	82	(Italy) Stefano Nepa	KTM	21	+22.745	17	
17	72	(Japan) Taiyo Furusato	Honda	21	+23.423	22	
18	18	(Italy) Matteo Bertelle	KTM	21	+23.667	24	
19	20	(France) Lorenzo Fellon	Honda	21	+23.810	26	
20	67	(Italy) Alberto Surra	Honda	21	+24.041	25	
21	64	(Indonesia) Mario Aji	Honda	21	+24.880	20	
22	87	(Spain) Gerard Riu	KTM	21	+37.416	28	
23	70	(United Kingdom) Joshua Whatley	Honda	21	+1:02.131	29	
Ret	5	(Spain) Jaume Masià	KTM	16	Accident Damage	12	
Ret	16	(Italy) Andrea Migno	Honda	14	Accident	8	
Ret	19	(United Kingdom) Scott Ogden	Honda	13	Clutch Lever	19	
Ret	28	(Spain) Izan Guevara	Gas Gas	9	Lost Power	3	
Ret	43	(Spain) Xavier Artigas	CFMoto	5	Mechanical	7	
Ret	22	(Spain) Ana Carrasco	KTM	4	Accident	27	
Fastest lap: (Italy) Andrea Migno (Honda) – 1:48.834 (lap 5)
OFFICIAL MOTO3 RACE REPORT

== Championship standings after the race ==
Below are the standings for the top five riders, constructors, and teams after the round.

=== MotoGP ===
Riders' Championship standings

	Pos.	Rider	Points
6	1	(Spain) Aleix Espargaró	45
	2	(South Africa) Brad Binder	38
2	3	(Italy) Enea Bastianini	36
4	4	(Spain) Álex Rins	36
2	5	(France) Fabio Quartararo	35

Constructors' Championship standings

	Pos.	Constructor	Points
1	1	(Italy) Ducati	61
1	2	(Austria) KTM	55
3	3	(Italy) Aprilia	45
	4	(Japan) Suzuki	37
2	5	(Japan) Yamaha	35

Teams' Championship standings

	Pos.	Team	Points
2	1	(Japan) Team Suzuki Ecstar	69
1	2	(Austria) Red Bull KTM Factory Racing	66
4	3	(Italy) Aprilia Racing	58
2	4	(Japan) Monster Energy Yamaha MotoGP	49
1	5	(Italy) Pramac Racing	44

=== Moto2 ===
Riders' Championship standings

	Pos.	Rider	Points
	1	(Italy) Celestino Vietti	70
	2	(Spain) Arón Canet	49
1	3	(Thailand) Somkiat Chantra	45
2	4	(Japan) Ai Ogura	36
2	5	(United Kingdom) Sam Lowes	35

Constructors' Championship standings

Pos.	Constructor	Points
1	(Germany) Kalex	75
2	(Italy) Boscoscuro	10
3	(Italy) MV Agusta	1

Teams' Championship standings

	Pos.	Team	Points
3	1	(Japan) Idemitsu Honda Team Asia	81
1	2	(Italy) Mooney VR46 Racing Team	70
1	3	(Belgium) Elf Marc VDS Racing Team	64
3	4	(Spain) Flexbox HP40	61
1	5	(Finland) Red Bull KTM Ajo	44

=== Moto3 ===
Riders' Championship standings

	Pos.	Rider	Points
1	1	(Spain) Sergio García	58
1	2	(Italy) Dennis Foggia	54
	3	(Spain) Izan Guevara	28
2	4	(Japan) Kaito Toba	27
	5	(Turkey) Deniz Öncü	26

Constructors' Championship standings

Pos.	Constructor	Points
1	(Japan) Honda	70
2	(Spain) Gas Gas	65
3	(Austria) KTM	37
4	(China) CFMoto	30
5	(Sweden) Husqvarna	27

Teams' Championship standings

	Pos.	Team	Points
	1	(Spain) Solunion GasGas Aspar Team	86
	2	(Luxembourg) Leopard Racing	71
	3	(Germany) CFMoto Racing Prüstel GP	40
2	4	(Spain) MT Helmets – MSI	36
2	5	(France) CIP Green Power	34

== Notes ==
Previous race: 2022 Indonesian Grand Prix	FIM Grand Prix World Championship; 2022 season	Next race: 2022 Grand Prix of the Americas
Previous race: 2019 Argentine Grand Prix	Argentine Republic motorcycle Grand Prix	Next race: 2023 Argentine Grand Prix
