= Plantar plate =

Structure in the foot

Details
- From: Metatarsal and phalanx
- To: Phalanx

Identifiers
- Latin: ligamenta plantaria
- MeSH: D000069262
- TA98: A03.6.10.803
- FMA: 71425

In the human foot, the plantar or volar plates (also called plantar or volar ligaments) are fibrocartilaginous structures found in the metatarsophalangeal (MTP) and interphalangeal (IP) joints. The anatomy and composition of the plantar plates are similar to the palmar plates in the metacarpophalangeal (MCP) and interphalangeal joints in the hand; the proximal origin is thin but the distal insertion is stout. Due to the weight-bearing nature of the human foot, the plantar plates are exposed to extension forces not present in the human hand.

The plantar plate supports the weight of the body and restricts dorsiflexion, whilst the main collateral ligament and the accessory collateral ligament (together referred as the collateral ligament complex, CLC) prevent motions in the transverse and sagittal planes. The major difference between the plantar plates of the MTP and IP joints is that they blend with the transverse metatarsal ligament in the MTP joints (not present in the toes). The MTP joint of the first toe differs from those of the other toes in that other muscles act on the joint, and in the presence of two sesamoid bones.

The plantar plate is firm but flexible fibrocartilage with a composition similar to that found in the menisci of the knee (composed roughly of 75% type-I collagen), and can thus withstand compressive loads and act as a supportive articular surface. Most of its fibers are oriented longitudinally, in the same direction as the plantar fascia, and the plate can thus sustain substantial tensile loads in this direction.

== Metatarsophalangeal joints ==
At the metatarsophalangeal joint the plantar plate plays an important role in the foot's weight-bearing function.

The plantar plate is attached to the proximal phalanx, to the major longitudinal bands of the plantar fascia, and to the collateral ligaments. Together with the collateral ligaments, it forms a soft tissue box which is connected to the sides of the metatarsal head. The plate from the substantial distal insertion of the plantar fascia and can withstand tensile loads in line with the fascia itself. The plate can withstand compressive loads from the metatarsal head because of the orientation of the fibers in its fibrocartilage.

The skeleton of the foot rests on a multi-layered ligamentous system of beams and trusses that responds to weight-bearing on irregular surfaces. A transverse system at the MTP joints is formed by the plantar plates and the deep transverse metatarsal ligament. The strong, longitudinal fibres of the deep plantar fascia are inserted along this transverse system to form a strong longitudinal system. The longitudinal system controls the longitudinal arches of the foot, whilst the transverse system controls the splay of the forefoot. Both systems are centered on the plantar plates and activated weight-bearing pressure on the metatarsal heads.

The tendon of the extensor digitorum longus muscle extends the MTP joint by using the plantar fibroaponeurotic structure as a sling. The muscle becomes a deforming force if the MTP joint is held in an extended position over a long time, such as in a high-heeled footwear. The muscle extends at the IP joints when the MTP joint is flexed or in neutral position. Flexion is primarily performed by intrinsic foot muscles; the second toe (the) is unique as it has two dorsal interossei but no plantar interossei muscles. The lumbrical muscles, attached to the medial side of the lesser toes, act as unopposed adductor, but become insufficient plantar flexors with chronic extension.
