= List of MeSH codes (A03) =

List of A03 MeSH codes

The following is a partial list of the "A" codes for Medical Subject Headings (MeSH), as defined by the United States National Library of Medicine (NLM).

This list continues the information at List of MeSH codes (A02). Codes following these are found at List of MeSH codes (A04). For other MeSH codes, see List of MeSH codes.

Authoritative sources for this content are the MeSH Browser and MeSH SPARQL Explorer.

== MeSH A03 – digestive system ==
=== MeSH A03.159 – biliary tract ===
==== MeSH A03.159.183 – bile ducts ====
- MeSH A03.159.183.079 – extrahepatic bile ducts
  - MeSH A03.159.183.079.300 – common bile duct
    - MeSH A03.159.183.079.300.950 – Ampulla of Vater
      - MeSH A03.159.183.079.300.950.600 – Sphincter of Oddi
  - MeSH A03.159.183.079.450 – cystic duct
  - MeSH A03.159.183.079.600 – common hepatic duct
- MeSH A03.159.183.158 – intrahepatic bile ducts
  - MeSH A03.159.183.158.125 – bile canaliculi

=== MeSH A03.556 – gastrointestinal tract ===
==== MeSH A03.556.124 – intestines ====
- MeSH A03.556.124.369 – intestinal mucosa
  - MeSH A03.556.124.369.290 – enterocytes
  - MeSH A03.556.124.369.320 – goblet cells
  - MeSH A03.556.124.369.700 – paneth cells
- MeSH A03.556.124.526 – large intestine
  - MeSH A03.556.124.526.070 – anal canal
  - MeSH A03.556.124.526.209 – cecum
    - MeSH A03.556.124.526.209.290 – appendix
  - MeSH A03.556.124.526.356 – colon
    - MeSH A03.556.124.526.356.333 – ascending colon
    - MeSH A03.556.124.526.356.500 – descending colon
    - MeSH A03.556.124.526.356.668 – sigmoid colon
    - MeSH A03.556.124.526.356.834 – transverse colon
  - MeSH A03.556.124.526.767 – rectum
- MeSH A03.556.124.684 – small intestine
  - MeSH A03.556.124.684.124 – duodenum
    - MeSH A03.556.124.684.124.236 – Ampulla of Vater
      - MeSH A03.556.124.684.124.236.572 – Sphincter of Oddi
    - MeSH A03.556.124.684.124.322 – Brunner's glands
  - MeSH A03.556.124.684.249 – ileum
    - MeSH A03.556.124.684.249.400 – ileocecal valve
    - MeSH A03.556.124.684.249.612 – Meckel's diverticulum
  - MeSH A03.556.124.684.500 – jejunum

==== MeSH A03.556.249 – lower gastrointestinal tract ====
- MeSH A03.556.249.124 – ileum
  - MeSH A03.556.249.124.400 – ileocecal valve
  - MeSH A03.556.249.124.612 – Meckel's diverticulum
- MeSH A03.556.249.249 – large intestine
  - MeSH A03.556.249.249.070 – anal canal
  - MeSH A03.556.249.249.209 – cecum
    - MeSH A03.556.249.249.209.290 – appendix
  - MeSH A03.556.249.249.356 – colon
    - MeSH A03.556.249.249.356.333 – ascending colon
    - MeSH A03.556.249.249.356.500 – descending colon
    - MeSH A03.556.249.249.356.668 – sigmoid colon
    - MeSH A03.556.249.249.356.834 – transverse colon
  - MeSH A03.556.249.249.767 – rectum
- MeSH A03.556.249.750 – jejunum

==== MeSH A03.556.500 – mouth ====
- MeSH A03.556.500.379 – dentition
- MeSH A03.556.500.760 – salivary glands
  - MeSH A03.556.500.760.464 – parotid gland
  - MeSH A03.556.500.760.640 – salivary ducts
  - MeSH A03.556.500.760.650 – minor salivary glands
  - MeSH A03.556.500.760.687 – sublingual gland
  - MeSH A03.556.500.760.812 – submandibular gland
  - MeSH A03.556.500.760.906 – Von Ebner's gland
- MeSH A03.556.500.885 – tongue
  - MeSH A03.556.500.885.431 – lingual frenum
  - MeSH A03.556.500.885.779 – taste buds

==== MeSH A03.556.875 – upper gastrointestinal tract ====
- MeSH A03.556.875.249 – duodenum
  - MeSH A03.556.875.249.160 – Ampulla of Vater
    - MeSH A03.556.875.249.160.572 – Sphincter of Oddi
  - MeSH A03.556.875.249.322 – Brunner's glands
- MeSH A03.556.875.500 – esophagus
  - MeSH A03.556.875.500.180 – esophageal mucosa
  - MeSH A03.556.875.500.360 – upper esophageal sphincter
  - MeSH A03.556.875.500.414 – esophagogastric junction
    - MeSH A03.556.875.500.414.350 – lower esophageal sphincter
- MeSH A03.556.875.875 – stomach
  - MeSH A03.556.875.875.163 – cardia
  - MeSH A03.556.875.875.330 – esophagogastric junction
    - MeSH A03.556.875.875.330.350 – lower esophageal sphincter
  - MeSH A03.556.875.875.419 – gastric fundus
  - MeSH A03.556.875.875.440 – gastric mucosa
    - MeSH A03.556.875.875.440.150 – gastric chief cells
    - MeSH A03.556.875.875.440.250 – enterochromaffin cells
    - MeSH A03.556.875.875.440.300 – gastrin-secreting cells
    - MeSH A03.556.875.875.440.708 – gastric parietal cells
    - MeSH A03.556.875.875.440.854 – somatostatin-secreting cells
  - MeSH A03.556.875.875.578 – gastric stump
  - MeSH A03.556.875.875.716 – pyloric antrum
  - MeSH A03.556.875.875.799 – pylorus

=== MeSH A03.620 – liver ===
==== MeSH A03.620.150 – intrahepatic bile ducts ====
- MeSH A03.620.150.125 – bile canaliculi

=== MeSH A03.734 – pancreas ===
==== MeSH A03.734.414 – islets of langerhans ====
- MeSH A03.734.414.065 – glucagon-secreting cells
- MeSH A03.734.414.131 – insulin-secreting cells
- MeSH A03.734.414.587 – pancreatic polypeptide-secreting cells
- MeSH A03.734.414.793 – somatostatin-secreting cells

==== MeSH A03.734.667 – pancreatic ducts ====
- MeSH A03.734.667.500 – Ampulla of Vater
