= Elizabeth Zsiga =

American linguist (born 1964)

Academic background
- Education: Yale University
- Thesis: Features, gestures, and the temporal aspects of phonological organization (1993)

Elizabeth Cook Zsiga (/ˈziːɡə/ ZEE-gə) (b. 1964) is an American linguist whose work focuses on phonology and phonetics. She is a Professor of Linguistics at Georgetown University.

== Education and career ==
Zsiga completed her Ph.D. at Yale University in 1993 as a student of Louis M. Goldstein, and affiliated with Haskins Laboratories, with a dissertation titled Features, gestures, and the temporal aspects of phonological organization. She has been on the faculty at Georgetown since 1994, as Assistant Professor (1994-1999), Associate Professor (1999-2011), and Professor (since 2011).

Zsiga's research interests have been wide-ranging and have been supported by numerous awards and federal grants from the National Science Foundation, including projects on the conservation of endangered languages (2007-2008), on the phonetics of consonants in Setswana and Sebirwa (2010 and 2011–2014), and as director for doctoral projects on the phonetics of Burmese tones (2009), consonant weakening in Florentine Italian (2007), acquisition of tone in a second language (2015), neutralization of phonemic contrasts in Dutch and Afrikaans (2019), and iconicity in American Sign Language (2020).

She is the author of a well-received introductory textbook to phonetics and phonology (Zsiga 2013), as well as a textbook on the phonology-phonetics interface (Zsiga 2021).

== Selected publications ==
=== Books ===
- Zsiga, Elizabeth C. (2013). The Sounds of Language: An Introduction to Phonetics and Phonology. Wiley-Blackwell. ISBN 978-1-4051-9103-6.
- Zsiga, Elizabeth C. (2021). The Phonology/Phonetics Interface. MIT Press. ISBN 978-0-262-54264-7.
- Zsiga, Elizabeth C.; Kramer, R.; Boyer, O., eds. (2015). Languages in Africa: Multilingualism, Education, and Language Policy. Georgetown University Press. ISBN 978-1-62616-153-5.

=== Selected articles ===
- Zsiga, Elizabeth C. (2011). "External Sandhi in a Second Language: The Phonetics and Phonology of Obstruent Nasalization in Korean-Accented English". Language. 87 (2): 289–345. doi:10.1353/lan.2011.0031. S2CID 144944548.
- Zsiga, Elizabeth C. (2000). "Phonetic alignment constraints: consonant overlap and palatalization in English and Russian". Journal of Phonetics. 28 (1): 69–102. doi:10.1006/jpho.2000.0109.
- Zsiga, E. (1995). "An acoustic and electropalatographic study of lexical and postlexical palatalization in American English". In Connell, B.; Arvaniti, A. (eds.). Phonology and Phonetic Evidence: Papers in Laboratory Phonology IV. Cambridge: Cambridge University Press. pp. 282–302. doi:10.1017/CBO9780511554315.020. ISBN 978-0-521-48259-2.
