= Pterygoid muscle =

Pterygoid muscle may refer to:

- Lateral pterygoid muscle
- Medial pterygoid muscle
