= Velić =

Velić may refer to:

- Ermin Velić (born 1959), Bosnian handball player
- Jasminko Velić (born 1965), Bosnian football manager and player
- Velić, Croatia, a village near Trilj

== See also ==
- Dušan Velič (1966–2023), Slovak chemist and politician
