= Lateral collateral ligament =

Lateral collateral ligament can refer to:

- Fibular collateral ligament, a ligament in the knee
- Lateral collateral ligament of ankle joint
- Radial collateral ligament of elbow joint
