= Longitudinal ligament =

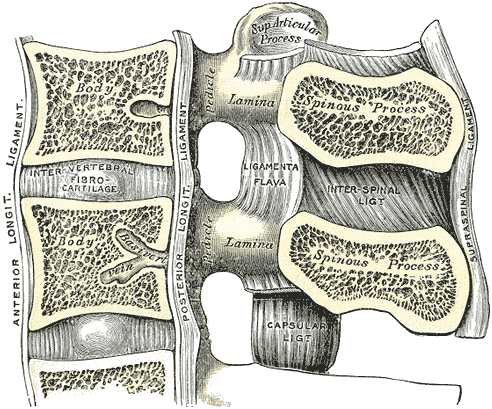
The anterior longitudinal ligament and posterior longitudinal ligament are both illustrated in this image; the anterior longitudinal ligament is to the far left, while the posterior longitudinal ligament is left of the center.

The longitudinal ligaments are two sets of ligaments that run along the spine.

These are:

- Anterior longitudinal ligament (ligamentum longitudinale anterius), which runs down the anterior surface of the spine
- Posterior longitudinal ligament (ligamentum longitudinale posterius), which is situated within the vertebral canal, and extends along the posterior surfaces of the bodies of the vertebrae
