= Velopharyngeal consonant =

Sounds found in some disordered speech

Voiceless velopharyngeal fricative

ʩ

Encoding
- Entity (decimal): &#681;
- Unicode (hex): U+02A9
Image

Voiced velopharyngeal fricative

ʩ̬

Voiceless velopharyngeal trill

𝼀

ʩ𐞪

Audio sample
- source · help

Encoding
- Entity (decimal): &#122624;
- Unicode (hex): U+1DF00
Image

Voiced velopharyngeal trill

𝼀̬

The velopharyngeal fricatives, also known as the posterior nasal fricatives, are a family of sounds produced principally by people with a cleft palate, as substitutes for sibilants (which in English are /s, z, ʃ, ʒ, tʃ, dʒ, tr, dr/). These are "the so-called 'nasal snort', in which (usually loud) friction results from leakage through a tense, but incompletely occluded, velopharyngeal port," and results from "the approximation but inadequate closure of the upper border of the velum and the posterior pharyngeal wall." To produce a velopharyngeal fricative, the soft palate approaches the pharyngeal wall and narrows the velopharyngeal port, such that the restricted port creates fricative turbulence in air forced through it into the nasal cavity. The articulation may be aided by a posterior positioning of the tongue and may involve velar flutter (a snorting sound).

The term 'velopharyngeal' indicates "articulation between the upper surface of the velum and the back wall of the naso-pharynx."

The base symbol for a velopharyngeal fricative in the extensions to the International Phonetic Alphabet for disordered speech is ⟨ʩ⟩, and secondary articulation is indicated with a superscript [𐞐]. (Note: A double tilde, ⟨◌͌⟩, was used prior to 2024.) The following variants are described:

- A voiceless velopharyngeal fricative [ʩ]
- A voiced velopharyngeal fricative [ʩ̬]
- A velopharyngeal fricative trill or "snort" (much as epiglottal fricatives tend to be trilled):
  - voiceless [𝼀]
  - voiced [𝼀̬]
- Other consonants accompanied by velopharyngeal frication, such as [s𐞐], potentially transcribed ⟨s𐞐𐞪⟩ to overtly indicate accompanying trill.

Velopharyngeal frication

◌𐞐

◌͌

The letter [𝼀] for the trill was only adopted in 2015; before then the letter ⟨ʩ⟩ had stood for both. Some authorities describe the trilled velopharyngeals as being accompanied by uvular trill rather than velar flutter. Whether this is a difference in interpretation or of pronunciation, it would be explicitly transcribed with a superscript ⟨ʀ⟩: voiceless [ʩ𐞪] and voiced [ʩ̬𐞪].

== See also ==
- Hypernasal speech

== Notes ==
Place →	Labial					Coronal										Dorsal					Laryngeal			
Manner ↓	Bilabial		Labiodental		Linguolabial		Dental		Alveolar		Postalveolar		Retroflex		(Alveolo-)palatal		Velar		Uvular		Pharyngeal/epiglottal		Glottal	
Nasal	m̥	m	ɱ̊	ɱ		n̼	n̪̊	n̪	n̥	n	n̠̊	n̠	ɳ̊	ɳ	ɲ̊	ɲ	ŋ̊	ŋ	ɴ̥	ɴ				
Plosive	p	b	p̪	b̪	t̼	d̼	t̪	d̪	t	d			ʈ	ɖ	c	ɟ	k	ɡ	q	ɢ	ʡ		ʔ	
Sibilant affricate							t̪s̪	d̪z̪	ts	dz	t̠ʃ	d̠ʒ	tʂ	dʐ	tɕ	dʑ								
Non-sibilant affricate	pɸ	bβ	p̪f	b̪v			t̪θ	d̪ð	tɹ̝̊	dɹ̝	t̠ɹ̠̊˔	d̠ɹ̠˔			cç	ɟʝ	kx	ɡɣ	qχ	ɢʁ	ʡʜ	ʡʢ	ʔh	
Sibilant fricative							s̪	z̪	s	z	ʃ	ʒ	ʂ	ʐ	ɕ	ʑ								
Non-sibilant fricative	ɸ	β	f	v	θ̼	ð̼	θ	ð	θ̠	ð̠	ɹ̠̊˔	ɹ̠˔	ɻ̊˔	ɻ˔	ç	ʝ	x	ɣ	χ	ʁ	ħ	ʕ	h	ɦ
Approximant		β̞		ʋ				ð̞		ɹ		ɹ̠		ɻ		j		ɰ						˷
Tap/flap		ⱱ̟		ⱱ					ɾ̥	ɾ			ɽ̊	ɽ						ɢ̆		ʡ̆		
Trill	ʙ̥	ʙ							r̥	r		r̠	ɽ̊r̥	ɽr					ʀ̥	ʀ	ʜ	ʢ		
Lateral affricate									tɬ	dɮ			tꞎ	d𝼅	c𝼆	ɟʎ̝	k𝼄	ɡʟ̝						
Lateral fricative							ɬ̪		ɬ	ɮ			ꞎ	𝼅	𝼆	ʎ̝	𝼄	ʟ̝						
Lateral approximant								l̪	l̥	l		l̠	ɭ̊	ɭ	ʎ̥	ʎ	ʟ̥	ʟ		ʟ̠				
Lateral tap/flap									ɺ̥	ɺ			𝼈̊	𝼈		ʎ̆		ʟ̆						

		BL	LD	D	A	PA	RF	P	V	U
Implosive	Voiced	ɓ			ɗ		ᶑ	ʄ	ɠ	ʛ
Implosive	Voiceless	ɓ̥			ɗ̥		ᶑ̊	ʄ̊	ɠ̊	ʛ̥
Ejective	Stop	pʼ			tʼ		ʈʼ	cʼ	kʼ	qʼ
Ejective	Affricate		p̪fʼ	tθʼ	tsʼ	tʃʼ	tʂʼ	tɕʼ	kxʼ	qχʼ
Ejective	Fricative	ɸʼ	fʼ	θʼ	sʼ	ʃʼ	ʂʼ	ɕʼ	xʼ	χʼ
Ejective	Lateral affricate				tɬʼ			c𝼆ʼ	k𝼄ʼ	q𝼄ʼ
Ejective	Lateral fricative				ɬʼ					
Click (top: velar; bottom: uvular)	Tenuis	kʘ qʘ		kǀ qǀ	kǃ qǃ		k𝼊 q𝼊	kǂ qǂ		
Click (top: velar; bottom: uvular)	Voiced	ɡʘ ɢʘ		ɡǀ ɢǀ	ɡǃ ɢǃ		ɡ𝼊 ɢ𝼊	ɡǂ ɢǂ		
Click (top: velar; bottom: uvular)	Nasal	ŋʘ ɴʘ		ŋǀ ɴǀ	ŋǃ ɴǃ		ŋ𝼊 ɴ𝼊	ŋǂ ɴǂ	ʞ	
Click (top: velar; bottom: uvular)	Tenuis lateral				kǁ qǁ					
Click (top: velar; bottom: uvular)	Voiced lateral				ɡǁ ɢǁ					
Click (top: velar; bottom: uvular)	Nasal lateral				ŋǁ ɴǁ					
