= Collateral ligaments of metacarpophalangeal joints =

Ligaments of the hand

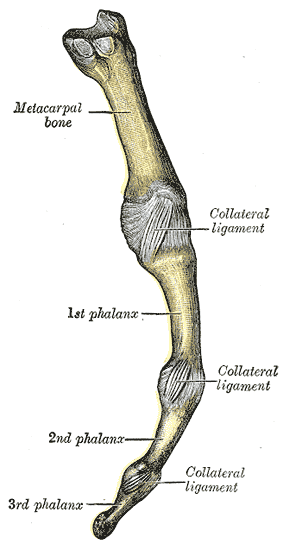
- Metacarpophalangeal joint and joints of digit. Ulnar aspect.

Details

Identifiers
- Latin: ligamenta collateralia articulationum metacarpophalangearum
- TA98: A03.5.11.502
- TA2: 1836
- FMA: 42771 71407, 42771

In human anatomy, the radial (RCL) and ulnar (UCL) collateral ligaments of the metacarpophalangeal joints (MCP) of the hand are the primary stabilisers of the MCP joints. A pair of collateral ligaments (one RCL and one UCL) flanks each MCP joint – one ligament on either side of the joint. Each attaches proximally at the head of the metacarpal bone, and distally at the base of the phalanx. Each extends obliquely in a palmar direction from its proximal attachment to its distal attachment. The collateral ligaments allow spreading apart the fingers with an open hand but prevents spreading when the hand is closed into a fist.

== Structure ==
Each collateral ligament has two parts: a cord-like collateral ligament proper (located more dorsally), and an accessory collateral ligament (located more volarly).

=== Attachments ===
The collateral ligaments originate on depressions on each side of the metacarpal heads dorsal to axis of rotation. From there, they extend obliquely and distally to their insertions onto tubercles at the base of the proximal phalanx. The accessory collateral ligaments originate volar to the collateral ligaments and are inserted on the palmar plate.

== Function ==
Due to the relation between their insertions on the sides of the metacarpal head and the axis of rotation in the joint, the collateral ligaments are taut in flexion but lax in extension, while the accessory collateral ligaments are lax in flexion but taut in extension. The collateral ligaments are lengthened 3–4 mm when the joint flexes 0-80° while the accessory collateral ligaments are shortened 1–2 mm. During hyperextension the accessory ligaments are lengthened while the proper ligaments are shortened. As a result, the joint is stable during full flexion while the relaxed collateral ligaments allows lateral and rotation movements during extension.

The tendons of interosseous and lumbricales add to the lateral stability of the joint.
