= Psoas =

Psoas /ˈsoʊ.æs/ (from Greek ψόας) can refer to:

- Psoas major muscle
- Psoas minor muscle
- Psoas sign
