= Collateral ligaments of metatarsophalangeal joints =

Ligaments of the foot

Details

Identifiers
- Latin: ligamenta collateralia articulationum metatarsophalangealium
- TA98: A03.6.10.802
- TA2: 1965
- FMA: 71424

The collateral ligaments of metatarsophalangeal joints are strong, rounded cords, placed one on either side of each joint, and attached, by one end, to the posterior tubercle on the side of the head of the metatarsal bone, and, by the other, to the contiguous extremity of the phalanx.

The place of dorsal ligaments is supplied by the extensor tendons on the dorsal surfaces of the joints.
