= Laryngeal cartilages =

Connective tissue surrounding the larynx

Laryngeal cartilage
- The cartilages of the larynx

Identifiers
- MeSH: D007817
- FMA: 55108

Laryngeal cartilages are cartilages which surround and protect the larynx. They form during embryonic development from pharyngeal arches. There are a total of nine laryngeal skeleton in humans:

- Thyroid cartilage – unpaired
- Cricoid cartilage – unpaired
- Epiglottis – unpaired
- Arytenoid cartilages – paired
- Corniculate cartilages – paired
- Cuneiform cartilages – paired
