= Velopharyngeal port =

Passage between the soft palate and pharynx

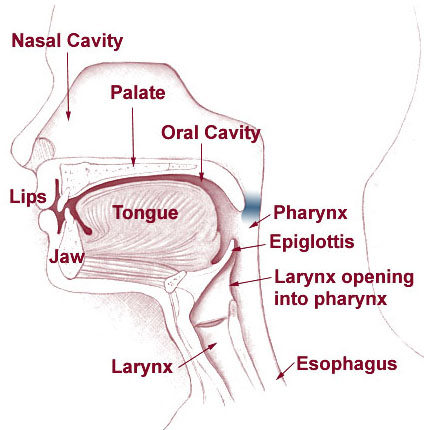
- Velopharyngeal port (blue)

Details
- Part of: Pharynx
- System: Respiratory system, digestive system

Identifiers
- MeSH: D055158

The velopharyngeal port or velopharyngeal sphincter is the passage between the nasopharynx and the oropharynx, i.e. within the velopharynx (the anatomical structures that make up the passage). It is closed off by the soft palate and uvula against the rear pharyngeal wall during swallowing to prevent food and water from entering the nasal passages. During speech, it is open for nasal sounds and closed for oral sounds, controlling the airflow. It is affected by cleft palate, resulting in velopharyngeal consonants.
