= LCR Team =

Motorcycle racing team

- Base: Monte Carlo, Monaco
- Principal: Lucio Cecchinello
- Rider(s): 5. Johann Zarco; 11. Diogo Moreira; 35. Cal Crutchlow (replacement rider)
- Motorcycle: Honda RC213V
- Tyres: Michelin
- Teams' Championships: MotoE: 2025

Lucio Cecchinello Racing, also known as LCR Team, is a motorcycle racing team competing in the MotoGP World Championship under the name Castrol Honda LCR with Johann Zarco and Pro Honda LCR with Diogo Moreira.

== MotoGP ==
=== 1996–2003: Lucio Cecchinello era ===
The team was established by Italian rider Lucio Cecchinello in 1996, with LCR being an initialism for Lucio Cecchinello Racing.

He set up his own team for the 125cc World Championship using Honda motorcycles, earning several top ten finishes. Similar results followed in the 1997.

==== Cecchinello-Ueda partnership with Hondas ====
In the 1998 season the team recruited two-time 125cc runner-up Noboru Ueda to ride alongside Cecchinello.

In only his second race for the team, Ueda got the team their first Grand Prix victory in the Malaysian Grand Prix at Johor Circuit.

Cecchinello's first win for his own team came later that year in Madrid Grand Prix at Jarama.

Cecchinello finished 5th in overall standings while Ueda only managed to finish 13th after missing half of the season due to injury.

Hiroyuki Kikuchi was drafted as Ueda's replacement during his absence.

The Cecchinello-Ueda partnership continued in 1999 and 2000, yielding another win by Ueda in 1999 Brazilian Grand Prix as well as numerous podiums for both riders.

Ueda finished both seasons in 5th position while Cecchinello struggled to match his teammates performance and was only able to finish in 9th and 11th position in those seasons.

==== Cecchinello-Jara partnership with Aprilias ====
In 2001 the team switched to Aprilia motorcycles.

The team also recruited the Spanish youngster Raúl Jara as Cecchinello's teammate.

Cecchinello's performance improved and he took the first win with Aprilia at the Catalan Grand Prix and finished the season 4th in overall standings.

==== Venturing into 250cc ====
In 2002 the team expanded their operation into 250cc class.

San Marinese rider Alex de Angelis was recruited to partner Cecchinello in 125cc, while the young Australian rookie, Casey Stoner and the Spanish David Checa were recruited to compete in 250cc class.

Cecchinello managed to repeat the last years performance and once again finished the season 4th in overall standing with 3 wins while De Angelis has his first career podium and finished 9th overall.

In the 250cc class, Stoner and Checa were able to achieve several top ten finish in the team's 250cc debut season.

==== Balancing between 125cc and 250cc ====
In 2003 the team continued their double assault in 125cc and 250cc.

Casey Stoner switched to the 125cc class to partner with Cecchinello, while French rider Randy de Puniet was recruited to ride in 250cc. Both teams had a successful season with 3 race wins in each class.

De Puniet, was also in contention for the World Championship. However, he only managed to finished 4th overall with three wins and nine podiums.

In 125cc, Cecchinello achieved two wins including a win in his home Grand Prix while Stoner achieved both his first career podium and his first career win with the team.

At the end of 2003, Cecchinello decided to end his racing career and concentrate in team management.

=== 2004–2005: Post-Cecchinello era ===
In 2004 the team retained de Puniet to ride an official Aprilia factory bike in 250cc.

In the 125cc class, the team recruited two Italian riders, Roberto Locatelli, a former 125cc World Champion and rookie Mattia Pasini.

Both de Puniet and Locatelli had successful season and were in contention for the World Championship, although they were only managed to finish the season 3rd in overall standings.

De Puniet had 1 win and 8 podiums while Locatelli had 2 wins and 6 podiums.

==== 250cc only days ====
For the 2005 season the team only competed in the 250cc class on Aprilia factory bikes.

Roberto Locatelli moved up to 250cc and Casey Stoner returned from his one-year stint at KTM.

Stoner managed to record five wins, 10 podiums and finished the season as runner-up to Dani Pedrosa.

Stoner's runner-up was the best result so far in the team history. He was also the first LCR rider to have 3+ race wins in a season.

=== 2006–present: Move to MotoGP ===
==== Casey Stoner (2006) with Honda ====
In October 2005, the team, along with Casey Stoner, reportedly had an agreement to move to the MotoGP class in the upcoming season with support from Yamaha.

After the season ended, Stoner received an offer from the Honda Pons team and tested the Honda RC211V bike with them at Valencia. With Stoner leaving the team, LCR had to put their MotoGP project on hold.

However, in December 2005, Stoner unexpectedly became available again after Honda Pons failed to secure sponsorship for the upcoming season. LCR immediately re-signed Stoner and made an agreement with HRC to run the RC211V in 2006.

Stoner recorded the team's first pole position in only their second MotoGP race at the Qatar Grand Prix. The subsequent race in Turkey saw LCR and Stoner record their first podium in MotoGP.

Stoner competed with Marco Melandri the entire race, until Melandri managed to beat him to the line. Stoner went on to finish the season in 8th position with a series of top 10 results.

Stoner left the team for a Ducati factory ride in 2007.

==== Carlos Checa (2007) ====
Veteran Spanish rider Carlos Checa replaced him at the team, riding the new 800cc Honda RC212V.

However, the team was not able to repeat their 2006 results, as Checa struggled to adapt to the new 800cc bike and his best finish was a sixth place at the Spanish and San Marino Grands Prix.

==== Randy de Puniet (2008–10) ====
Randy de Puniet rejoined the team in 2008.

Again, the team struggled with the satellite bike and Michelin tyres. De Puniet's best finish was only sixth position at the United States Grand Prix.

He returned for the 2009 season, once again with the RC212V, but with Bridgestone tyres, as MotoGP shifted to a single tyre manufacturer rule.

In the British Grand Prix, De Puniet finished third, his best result with the team, and the team's first podium in the premier class since Stoner's 2006 podium.

In 2010, De Puniet finished the season in ninth place aboard a Honda RC212V, with his best result being a fourth place at the Catalan Grand Prix.

==== Toni Elias (2011) ====
After the departure of de Puniet to the Pramac Racing team, the team signed reigning Moto2 world champion Toni Elías for the 2011 season, and Elías finished 15th in the championship, finishing five races in the top ten.

==== Stefan Bradl (2012–14) ====
At the end of 2011, the team signed German rider Stefan Bradl, who had just won the Moto2 championship.

Bradl rode the all-new Honda RC213V, and had a good season, finishing consistently in the top-10.

His best result was a fourth-place finish at Mugello. He won the Rookie of the Year award, finishing eighth in the championship.

2013 was even better for Bradl, as he was consistently fighting for top five places.

Bradl took his first premier class pole position at the United States Grand Prix at Laguna Seca.

He finished second in the race, his first MotoGP podium. However a broken ankle sustained in a crash in Malaysia cost him a top five finish in the final championship standings. Bradl eventually finished the season in seventh place.

==== 2 bikes expansion (2015) ====
Midway through the 2014 season, it was announced that LCR would expand to a two-bike satellite Honda team in 2015.

The team's second bike is an open-specification Honda RC213V-RS, "replacing" Gresini Racing, as they will become an Aprilia factory team.

The team also announced a partnership with foreign exchange trading company CWM FX represented by British rider Cal Crutchlow on a factory-specification Honda RC213V bike, and Australian rookie Jack Miller, riding the open-specification RC213V-RS.

After the 2015 Czech Republic Grand Prix, CWM pulled out of the team due to fraud allegations following a police raid in March 2015.

The sponsorship was run by their long-term sponsor, Givi. At Sepang, Crutchlow's bike represented a new livery from Castrol.

==== Cal Crutchlow and first MotoGP victory (2016–2017) ====
Miller left the team in 2016 to join Estrella Galicia 0,0 Marc VDS, leaving Crutchlow as the sole rider for LCR in 2016.

Crutchlow started the season poorly, with four DNFs and one finish outside the points in the first eight races, leaving him outside the top 15 of the standings. He then finished second in the German Grand Prix before taking his first victory in Brno just two races later.

This was LCR's first ever win in the premier class, and also was the first race win by a British rider in the 500cc/MotoGP class since Barry Sheene at the 1981 Swedish Grand Prix.

His victory in Brno was also part of MotoGP's record of eight different riders winning in eight successive races, with Crutchlow's Brno victory being the sixth in the streak.

He then scored another podium in Silverstone before taking another victory at Phillip Island, making him the first Briton ever to win the Australian Grand Prix.

He ended the year with 141 points, finishing seventh in the championship.

In 2017, Crutchlow scored one podium finish and was ninth in the riders' world championship.

==== Re-expansion to two bikes (2018–2020) ====
For 2018, LCR Team signed Japanese rookie Takaaki Nakagami to partner Crutchlow.

The team ran separate liveries with different main sponsors for each rider, Castrol for Crutchlow and Idemitsu for Nakagami.

Nakagami's best finish was sixth place at the season finale in Valencia, ultimately finishing 20th in the riders' championship.

Crutchlow started the year with a win in Argentina and scored podium finishes in Misano and Motegi. He had to finish the season early after a crash at the Australian GP, fracturing his leg and missing the final three races of the season.

Crutchlow finished the season with 148 points and seventh in the riders' championship.

Former LCR rider Stefan Bradl replaced Crutchlow for the final two races.

In 2019, Crutchlow achieved three podiums and finished 9th in the championship.

Nakagami improved to 13th place, despite missing the final three rounds of the season to undergo surgery. He was replaced in the final three rounds by Johann Zarco.

Nakagami and Crutchlow defended the LCR colours in 2020, and at the end of the year the British decided to retire.

==== Struggles with Honda RC213V (2021–2024) ====
In 2021, Álex Márquez joined Nakagami and repeated the experience in 2022, both riders struggling to show their true potential.

For the 2023 season, Álex Rins has joined forces with Nakagami. Álex Rins won the 2023 Grand Prix of the Americas.

For the 2024 season, Johann Zarco replaced Álex Rins, while Nakagami continued with the team.

==== Nakagami leaves LCR Team (2025) ====
With Nakagami leaving LCR, Johann Zarco would partner with Thai rookie Somkiat Chantra in 2025.

Johann Zarco became the first Honda race winner since Álex Rins in the 2023 Grand Prix of the Americas by winning the 2025 French GP by taking advantage of the changeable conditions, in doing so becoming the first French winner of the French Grand Prix since 1954 with Pierre Monneret, he also became the first ever French winner at the Bugatti Circuit in Le Mans, as well as the first non-Ducati Winner since Maverick Vinales winning the 2024 Grand Prix of the Americas.

Chantra will depart the team at the end of 2025, joining the Honda HRC team in the World Superbike Championship. He is set to be replaced by Diogo Moreira.

==== 2026–present: Zarco and Moreira era ====
For the 2026 season, the team retained Johann Zarco and promoted the 2025 Moto2 World Champion Diogo Moreira to the premier class, replacing Somkiat Chantra. Moreira's promotion marked a significant youth investment for the team, pairing the Brazilian rookie with the veteran Frenchman.

In February 2026, LCR Honda announced a strategic three-year partnership with digital sports media platform GOD55 Sports as a Premium Sponsor. The agreement, covering the 2026, 2027, and 2028 seasons, included branding placement on the Honda RC213V bikes of both riders. The partnership also featured special livery activations, with Johann Zarco scheduled to run a dedicated GOD55 Sports livery at the Italian Grand Prix and the Indonesian Grand Prix.

Team Principal Lucio Cecchinello cited the partnership as a key move to engage with the Southeast Asian motorsport audience.

Crutchlow will make his competitive return to MotoGP at the upcoming Italian Grand Prix, replacing an injured Zarco.

David Alonso will join LCR in 2027 following Diogo Moreira stepping up to the Honda HRC Castrol team in MotoGP.

== MotoE ==
As a satellite team in MotoGP, LCR was invited to enter the inaugural MotoE season with Niccolò Canepa and former LCR 250cc and MotoGP rider Randy de Puniet.

In 2020, de Puniet was replaced on the MotoE team by Belgian Xavier Siméon.

For 2021, 2022 and 2023, the LCR E-Team competed in the electric series with the duo set by Eric Granado and Miquel Pons, both showing strong performances on board their bikes.

== Results ==
=== Grand Prix motorcycle racing ===
==== By rider ====
Year	Class	Team name	Bike	Riders	Races	Wins	Podiums	Poles	F. laps	Points	Pos.
1996	125cc	Honda Team GP3	Honda RS125R	(Italy) Lucio Cecchinello	15	0	0	0	0	59	15th
1997	125cc	Spidi Honda LCR	Honda RS125R	(Italy) Lucio Cecchinello	15	0	0	0	0	73	14th
1998	125cc	Givi Honda LCR	Honda RS125R	(Italy) Lucio Cecchinello	13	1	3	0	1	130	5th
1998	125cc	Givi Honda LCR	Honda RS125R	(Japan) Noboru Ueda	8	1	1	4	0	62	13th
1998	125cc	Givi Honda LCR	Honda RS125R	(Japan) Hiroyuki Kikuchi	6	0	1	0	0	51	15th
1999	125cc	Givi Honda LCR	Honda RS125R	(Japan) Noboru Ueda	16	1	6	1	2	171	5th
1999	125cc	Givi Honda LCR	Honda RS125R	(Italy) Lucio Cecchinello	16	0	4	3	0	108	9th
2000	125cc	Givi Honda LCR	Honda RS125R	(Japan) Noboru Ueda	16	0	4	1	2	153	5th
2000	125cc	Givi Honda LCR	Honda RS125R	(Italy) Lucio Cecchinello	16	0	0	0	0	91	11th
2001	125cc	MS Aprilia LCR	Aprilia RS125R	(Italy) Lucio Cecchinello	16	1	4	1	2	156	4th
2001	125cc	MS Aprilia LCR	Aprilia RS125R	(Spain) Raúl Jara	16	0	0	0	0	9	26th
2002	250cc	Safilo Oxydo Race LCR	Aprilia RSV 250	(Australia) Casey Stoner	15	0	0	0	0	68	12th
2002	250cc	Safilo Oxydo Race LCR	Aprilia RSV 250	(Spain) David Checa	15	0	0	0	0	60	13th
2002	125cc	Safilo Oxydo Race LCR	Aprilia RS125R	(Italy) Lucio Cecchinello	16	3	5	0	5	180	4th
2002	125cc	Safilo Oxydo Race LCR	Aprilia RS125R	(San Marino) Alex de Angelis	16	0	1	1	0	87	9th
2003	250cc	Safilo Oxydo – LCR	Aprilia RSV 250	(France) Randy de Puniet	16	3	9	5	2	208	4th
2003	125cc	Safilo Oxydo – LCR	Aprilia RS125R	(Australia) Casey Stoner	14	1	4	1	2	125	8th
2003	125cc	Safilo Oxydo – LCR	Aprilia RS125R	(Italy) Lucio Cecchinello	16	2	3	0	2	112	9th
2004	250cc	Safilo Carrera – LCR	Aprilia RSV 250	(France) Randy de Puniet	16	1	8	2	0	214	**3rd**
2004	125cc	Safilo Carrera – LCR	Aprilia RS125R	(Italy) Roberto Locatelli	16	2	6	1	1	192	**3rd**
2004	125cc	Safilo Carrera – LCR	Aprilia RS125R	(Italy) Mattia Pasini		0	0	0	0	54	15th
2005	250cc	Carrera Sunglasses – LCR	Aprilia RSV 250	(Australia) Casey Stoner	16	5	10	2	1	254	**2nd**
2005	250cc	Carrera Sunglasses – LCR	Aprilia RSV 250	(Italy) Roberto Locatelli	16	0	0	0	0	61	13th
2006	MotoGP	Honda LCR	Honda RC211V	(Australia) Casey Stoner	16	0	1	1	0	119	8th
2007	MotoGP	Honda LCR	Honda RC211V	(Spain) Carlos Checa	18	0	0	0	0	65	14th
2007	250cc	Honda LCR	Honda RS250R	(Republic of Ireland) Eugene Laverty	17	0	0	0	0	6	25th
2008	MotoGP	LCR Honda MotoGP	Honda RC212V	(France) Randy de Puniet	18	0	0	0	0	61	15th
2009	MotoGP	LCR Honda MotoGP	Honda RC212V	(France) Randy de Puniet	17	0	1	0	0	106	11th
2010	MotoGP	LCR Honda MotoGP	Honda RC212V	(France) Randy de Puniet	17	0	0	0	0	116	9th
2010	MotoGP	LCR Honda MotoGP	Honda RC212V	(United States) Roger Lee Hayden	1	0	0	0	0	5	19th
2011	MotoGP	LCR Honda MotoGP	Honda RC212V	(Spain) Toni Elías	17	0	0	0	0	61	15th
2011	MotoGP	LCR Honda MotoGP	Honda RC212V	(Japan) Kousuke Akiyoshi	1 (2) (Note: Non-bracketed number refers to the number accumulated with team, with number in brackets referring to the total accumulated for the season.)	0	0	0	0	4 (7)	20th
2011	MotoGP	LCR Honda MotoGP	Honda RC212V	(United States) Ben Bostrom	1	0	0	0	0	0	NC
2012	MotoGP	LCR Honda MotoGP	Honda RC213V	(Germany) Stefan Bradl	18	0	0	0	0	135	8th
2013	MotoGP	LCR Honda MotoGP	Honda RC213V	(Germany) Stefan Bradl	16	0	1	1	0	156	7th
2014	MotoGP	LCR Honda MotoGP	Honda RC213V	(Germany) Stefan Bradl	18	0	0	0	0	117	9th
2015	MotoGP	CWM LCR Honda; LCR Honda	Honda RC213V	(United Kingdom) Cal Crutchlow	18	0	1	0	0	125	8th
2015	MotoGP	CWM LCR Honda; LCR Honda	Honda RC213V-RS	(Australia) Jack Miller	18	0	0	0	0	17	19th
2016	MotoGP	LCR Honda	Honda RC213V	(United Kingdom) Cal Crutchlow	18	2	4	1	1	141	7th
2017	MotoGP	LCR Honda	Honda RC213V	(United Kingdom) Cal Crutchlow	18	0	1	0	0	112	9th
2018	MotoGP	LCR Honda Idemitsu	Honda RC213V	(Japan) Takaaki Nakagami	18	0	0	0	0	33	20th
2018	MotoGP	LCR Honda Castrol	Honda RC213V	(United Kingdom) Cal Crutchlow	15	1	3	1	0	148	7th
2018	MotoGP	LCR Honda Castrol	Honda RC213V	(Germany) Stefan Bradl	2	0	0	0	0	10	24th
2019	MotoGP	LCR Honda Idemitsu	Honda RC213V	(Japan) Takaaki Nakagami	16	0	0	0	0	74	13th
2019	MotoGP	LCR Honda Idemitsu	Honda RC213V	(France) Johann Zarco	3 (16)	0	0	0	0	3 (30)	18th
2019	MotoGP	LCR Honda Castrol	Honda RC213V	(United Kingdom) Cal Crutchlow	19	0	3	0	0	133	9th
2019	MotoE	LCR E-Team	Energica Ego Corsa	(Italy) Niccolò Canepa	6	0	0	0	0	46	9th
2019	MotoE	LCR E-Team	Energica Ego Corsa	(France) Randy de Puniet	6	0	0	0	0	21	17th
2020	MotoGP	LCR Honda Idemitsu	Honda RC213V	(Japan) Takaaki Nakagami	14	0	0	1	0	116	10th
2020	MotoGP	LCR Honda Castrol	Honda RC213V	(United Kingdom) Cal Crutchlow	11	0	0	0	0	32	18th
2020	MotoE	LCR E-Team	Energica Ego Corsa	(Italy) Niccolò Canepa	7	0	0	0	0	51	9th
2020	MotoE	LCR E-Team	Energica Ego Corsa	(Belgium) Xavier Siméon	7	0	1	0	0	45	10th
2021	MotoGP	LCR Honda Idemitsu	Honda RC213V	(Japan) Takaaki Nakagami	18	0	0	0	0	76	15th
2021	MotoGP	LCR Honda Castrol	Honda RC213V	(Spain) Álex Márquez	18	0	0	0	0	70	16th
2021	MotoE	LCR E-Team	Energica Ego Corsa	(Italy) Kevin Zannoni	7	0	0	0	1	44	12th
2021	MotoE	LCR E-Team	Energica Ego Corsa	(Spain) Miquel Pons	6	1	2	0	0	73	7th
2022	MotoGP	LCR Honda Idemitsu	Honda RC213V	(Japan) Takaaki Nakagami	17	0	0	0	0	48	18th
2022	MotoGP	LCR Honda Idemitsu	Honda RC213V	(Japan) Tetsuta Nagashima	3	0	0	0	0	0	29th
2022	MotoGP	LCR Honda Castrol	Honda RC213V	(Spain) Álex Márquez	20	0	0	0	0	50	17th
2022	MotoE	LCR E-Team	Energica Ego Corsa	(Brazil) Eric Granado	12	5	8	2	4	192.5	**2nd**
2022	MotoE	LCR E-Team	Energica Ego Corsa	(Spain) Miquel Pons	12	0	4	2	1	124	5th
2023	MotoGP	LCR Honda Idemitsu	Honda RC213V	(Japan) Takaaki Nakagami	20	0	0	0	0	56	18th
2023	MotoGP	LCR Honda Castrol	Honda RC213V	(Spain) Álex Rins	7	1	1	0	1	54	19th
2023	MotoGP	LCR Honda Castrol	Honda RC213V	(Germany) Stefan Bradl	3 (6)	0	0	0	0	6 (8)	26th
2023	MotoGP	LCR Honda Castrol	Honda RC213V	(Spain) Iker Lecuona	5 (7)	0	0	0	0	0	30th
2023	MotoGP	LCR Honda Castrol	Honda RC213V	(Japan) Takumi Takahashi	0	0	0	0	0	0	NC
2023	MotoE	LCR E-Team	Ducati V21L	(Brazil) Eric Granado	14	1	4	2	1	139	7th
2023	MotoE	LCR E-Team	Ducati V21L	(Spain) Miquel Pons	16	0	0	0	0	98	12th
2024	MotoGP	Castrol Honda LCR	Honda RC213V	(France) Johann Zarco	20	0	0	0	0	55	17th
2024	MotoGP	Idemitsu Honda LCR	Honda RC213V	(Japan) Takaaki Nakagami	20	0	0	0	0	31	19th
2024	MotoE	LCR E-Team	Ducati V21L	(Italy) Mattia Casadei	16	2	6	0	0	231	**2nd**
2024	MotoE	LCR E-Team	Ducati V21L	(Brazil) Eric Granado	16	0	2	4	0	112	10th
2025	MotoGP	Castrol Honda LCR	Honda RC213V	(France) Johann Zarco	22	1	2	0	0	148	12th
2025	MotoGP	Idemitsu Honda LCR	Honda RC213V	(Thailand) Somkiat Chantra	17	0	0	0	0	7	26th
2025	MotoGP	Idemitsu Honda LCR	Honda RC213V	(Japan) Takaaki Nakagami	0 (3)	0	0	0	0	0 (10)	23rd
2025	MotoE	LCR E-Team	Ducati V21L	(Italy) Mattia Casadei	14	3	7	4	1	188	**2nd**
2025	MotoE	LCR E-Team	Ducati V21L	(Brazil) Eric Granado	13	2	5	4	2	162	4th
2026	MotoGP	Castrol Honda LCR	Honda RC213V	(France) Johann Zarco	13	0	0	0	0	63*	17th*
2026	MotoGP	Castrol Honda LCR	Honda RC213V	(United Kingdom) Cal Crutchlow	6	0	0	0	0	0*	29th*
2026	MotoGP	Pro Honda LCR	Honda RC213V	(Brazil) Diogo Moreira	19	0	0	0	0	78*	15th*

* Season still in progress.

=== MotoGP results ===
==== By season ====
(key) (Races in bold indicate pole position; races in italics indicate fastest lap)

Year	Bike	Tyres	No.	Riders	Race																						Riders' standings		Teams' standings		Manufacturers' standings	
Year	Bike	Tyres	No.	Riders	1	2	3	4	5	6	7	8	9	10	11	12	13	14	15	16	17	18	19	20	21	22	Pts	Pos	Pts	Pos	Pts	Pos
2006	Honda RC211V	M			ESP	QAT	TUR	CHN	FRA	ITA	CAT	NED	GBR	GER	USA	CZE	MAL	AUS	JPN	POR	VAL											
2006	Honda RC211V	M	27	(Australia) Casey Stoner	6	**5**	2	5	4	Ret	Ret	4	4	DNS	Ret	6	8	6	Ret	Ret	Ret						119	8th	119	8th	360	1st
2007	Honda RC212V	M			QAT	ESP	TUR	CHN	FRA	ITA	CAT	GBR	NED	GER	USA	CZE	SMR	POR	JPN	AUS	MAL	VAL										
2007	Honda RC212V	M	7	(Spain) Carlos Checa	Ret	6	12	10	Ret	Ret	17	Ret	11	14	14	10	6	7	18	11	14	12					65	14th	65	9th	313	2nd
2008	Honda RC212V	M			QAT	ESP	POR	CHN	FRA	ITA	CAT	GBR	NED	GER	USA	CZE	SMR	IND	JPN	AUS	MAL	VAL										
2008	Honda RC212V	M	14	(France) Randy de Puniet	9	Ret	15	13	9	Ret	Ret	12	Ret	8	6	16	Ret	13	12	9	10	15					61	15th	61	10th	315	3rd
2009	Honda RC212V	B			QAT	JPN	ESP	FRA	ITA	CAT	NED	USA	GER	GBR	CZE	IND	SMR	POR	AUS	MAL	VAL											
2009	Honda RC212V	B	14	(France) Randy de Puniet	10	11	4	14	8	8	7	9	Ret	3	10	12	12	11	8	Ret	11						106	11th	106	9th	297	2nd
2010	Honda RC212V	B			QAT	ESP	FRA	ITA	GBR	NED	CAT	GER	USA	CZE	IND	SMR	ARA	JPN	MAL	AUS	POR	VAL										
2010	Honda RC212V	B	14	(France) Randy de Puniet	6	9	7	6	6	6	4	Ret		10	13	13	Ret	9	10	10	6	10					116	9th	121	7th	342	2nd
2010	Honda RC212V	B	95	(United States) Roger Lee Hayden									11														5	19th	121	7th	342	2nd
2011	Honda RC212V	B			QAT	ESP	POR	FRA	CAT	GBR	NED	ITA	GER	USA	CZE	IND	SMR	ARA	JPN	AUS	MAL	VAL										
2011	Honda RC212V	B	24	(Spain) Toni Elías	Ret	9	11	11	13	8	10	15	16	13	11	13	15	Ret	Ret	8	C	10					61	15th	61	10th	405	1st
2011	Honda RC212V	B	23	(United States) Ben Bostrom										Ret													0	NC	—N/a	—N/a	405	1st
2011	Honda RC212V	B	64	(Japan) Kousuke Akiyoshi															12								4 (7)	20th	—N/a	—N/a	405	1st
2012	Honda RC213V	B			QAT	ESP	POR	FRA	CAT	GBR	NED	GER	ITA	USA	IND	CZE	SMR	ARA	JPN	MAL	AUS	VAL										
2012	Honda RC213V	B	6	(Germany) Stefan Bradl	8	7	9	5	8	8	Ret	5	4	7	6	5	6	Ret	6	Ret	6	Ret					135	8th	135	7th	412	1st
2013	Honda RC213V	B			QAT	AME	ESP	FRA	ITA	CAT	NED	GER	USA	IND	CZE	GBR	SMR	ARA	MAL	AUS	JPN	VAL										
2013	Honda RC213V	B	6	(Germany) Stefan Bradl	Ret	5	Ret	10	4	5	6	4	**2**	7	6	6	5	5	DNS	DNS	5	6					156	7th	156	6th	389	1st
2014	Honda RC213V	B			QAT	AME	ARG	ESP	FRA	ITA	CAT	NED	GER	IND	CZE	GBR	SMR	ARA	JPN	AUS	MAL	VAL										
2014	Honda RC213V	B	6	(Germany) Stefan Bradl	Ret	4	5	10	7	Ret	5	10	16	Ret	7	7	Ret	4	7	Ret	4	8					117	9th	117	8th	409	1st
2015		B			QAT	AME	ARG	ESP	FRA	ITA	CAT	NED	GER	IND	CZE	GBR	SMR	ARA	JPN	AUS	MAL	VAL										
2015	Honda RC213V	B	35	(United Kingdom) Cal Crutchlow	7	7	3	4	Ret	Ret	Ret	6	7	8	Ret	Ret	11	7	6	7	5	9					125	8th	142	7th	355	2nd
2015	Honda RC213V-RS	B	43	(Australia) Jack Miller	Ret	14	12	20	Ret	Ret	11	Ret	15	Ret	19	Ret	12	19	Ret	15	17	21					17	19th	142	7th	355	2nd
2016	Honda RC213V	M			QAT	ARG	AME	ESP	FRA	ITA	CAT	NED	GER	AUT	CZE	GBR	SMR	ARA	JPN	AUS	MAL	VAL										
2016	Honda RC213V	M	35	(United Kingdom) Cal Crutchlow	Ret	Ret	16	11	Ret	11	6	Ret	2	15	1	**2**	8	5	5	1	Ret	Ret					141	7th	141	8th	369	1st
2017	Honda RC213V	M			QAT	ARG	AME	ESP	FRA	ITA	CAT	NED	GER	CZE	AUT	GBR	SMR	ARA	JPN	AUS	MAL	VAL										
2017	Honda RC213V	M	35	(United Kingdom) Cal Crutchlow	Ret	3	4	Ret	5	Ret	11	4	10	5	15	4	13	Ret	Ret	5	15	8					112	9th	112	8th	357	1st
2018	Honda RC213V	M			QAT	ARG	AME	ESP	FRA	ITA	CAT	NED	GER	CZE	AUT	GBR	SMR	ARA	THA	JPN	AUS	MAL	VAL									
2018	Honda RC213V	M	30	(Japan) Takaaki Nakagami	17	13	14	12	15	18	Ret	19	Ret	17	15	C	13	12	22	15	14	14	6				33	20th	191	7th	375	1st
2018	Honda RC213V	M	35	(United Kingdom) Cal Crutchlow	4	1	19	**Ret**	8	6	4	6	Ret	5	4	C	3	Ret	7	2	DNS						148	7th	191	7th	375	1st
2018	Honda RC213V	M	6	(Germany) Stefan Bradl																		13	9				10	24th	191	7th	375	1st
2019	Honda RC213V	M			QAT	ARG	AME	ESP	FRA	ITA	CAT	NED	GER	CZE	AUT	GBR	SMR	ARA	THA	JPN	AUS	MAL	VAL									
2019	Honda RC213V	M	5	(France) Johann Zarco																	13	Ret	Ret				3 (30)	18th	210	7th	426	1st
2019	Honda RC213V	M	30	(Japan) Takaaki Nakagami	9	7	10	9	Ret	5	8	Ret	14	9	11	17	18	10	10	16							74	13th	210	7th	426	1st
2019	Honda RC213V	M	35	(United Kingdom) Cal Crutchlow	3	13	Ret	8	9	8	Ret	7	3	5	Ret	6	Ret	6	12	5	2	Ret	Ret				133	9th	210	7th	426	1st
2020	Honda RC213V	M			SPA	ANC	CZE	AUT	STY	RSM	EMI	CAT	FRA	ARA	TER	EUR	VAL	POR														
2020	Honda RC213V	M	30	(Japan) Takaaki Nakagami	10	4	8	6	7	9	6	7	7	5	**Ret**	4	Ret	5									116	10th	148	8th	144	5th
2020	Honda RC213V	M	35	(United Kingdom) Cal Crutchlow	DNS	13	13	15	17	DNS		10	Ret	8	11	Ret	13	13									32	18th	148	8th	144	5th
2021	Honda RC213V	M			QAT	DOH	POR	SPA	FRA	ITA	CAT	GER	NED	STY	AUT	GBR	ARA	RSM	AME	MAL	ALG	VAL										
2021	Honda RC213V	M	30	(Japan) Takaaki Nakagami	Ret	17	10	4	7	Ret	13	13	9	5	13	13	10	10	17	15	11	Ret					76	15th	146	7th	214	4th
2021	Honda RC213V	M	73	(Spain) Álex Márquez	Ret	Ret	8	Ret	6	14	11	Ret	14	9	9	8	Ret	15	12	Ret	4	13					70	16th	146	7th	214	4th
2022	Honda RC213V	M			QAT	INA	ARG	AME	POR	SPA	FRA	ITA	CAT	GER	NED	GBR	AUT	RSM	ARA	JPN	THA	AUS	MAL	VAL								
2022	Honda RC213V	M	30	(Japan) Takaaki Nakagami	10	19	12	14	16	7	7	8	Ret	Ret	12	13	Ret	15	Ret	20				14			48	18th	98	10th	155	6th
2022	Honda RC213V	M	45	(Japan) Tetsuta Nagashima																	22	19	Ret				0	29th	98	10th	155	6th
2022	Honda RC213V	M	73	(Spain) Álex Márquez	Ret	13	15	Ret	7	13	14	14	10	Ret	15	17	14	10	12	13	8	Ret	17	17			50	17th	98	10th	155	6th
2023	Honda RC213V	M			POR	ARG	AME	SPA	FRA	ITA	GER	NED	GBR	AUT	CAT	RSM	IND	JPN	INA	AUS	THA	MAL	QAT	VAL								
2023	Honda RC213V	M	30	(Japan) Takaaki Nakagami	12	13	Ret	9	9	13	14	8	16	18	15	19	11	11	11	19	14	18	19	12			56	18th	116	10th	185	5th
2023	Honda RC213V	M	42	(Spain) Álex Rins	10	9	1^{2}	Ret	Ret	DNS								WD	9	DNS				Ret			54	19th	116	10th	185	5th
2023	Honda RC213V	M	6	(Germany) Stefan Bradl								13					15	14									6 (8)	26th	116	10th	185	5th
2023	Honda RC213V	M	27	(Spain) Iker Lecuona									17	20	16							16	Ret				0	30th	116	10th	185	5th
2023	Honda RC213V	M	7	(Japan) Takumi Takahashi												DNQ											0	NC	116	10th	185	5th
2024	Honda RC213V	M			QAT	POR	AME	SPA	FRA	CAT	ITA	NED	GER	GBR	AUT	ARA	RSM	EMI	INA	JPN	AUS	THA	MAL	SLD								
2024	Honda RC213V	M	5	(France) Johann Zarco	12	15	Ret	Ret	12	16	19	13	17	14	21	14	12	15	9^{8}	11	12	8	11	14			55	17th	86	10th	75	5th
2024	Honda RC213V	M	30	(Japan) Takaaki Nakagami	19	14	Ret	14	14	14	Ret	16	14	15	14	12	13	17	12	13	18	13	Ret	17			31	19th	86	10th	75	5th
2025	Honda RC213V	M			THA	ARG	AME	QAT	SPA	FRA	GBR	ARA	ITA	NED	GER	CZE	AUT	HUN	CAT	RSM	JPN	INA	AUS	MAL	POR	VAL						
2025	Honda RC213V	M	5	(France) Johann Zarco	7	6^{4}	17	4	11	1^{6}	2^{5}	Ret	Ret	12	Ret^{7}	13^{8}	12^{9}	Ret	Ret^{7}	16	9	12	Ret	12^{8}	9^{7}	12	148	12th	155	10th	285	4th
2025	Honda RC213V	M	30	(Japan) Takaaki Nakagami												DNS											0 (10)	23rd	155	10th	285	4th
2025	Honda RC213V	M	35	(Thailand) Somkiat Chantra	18	18	16	18	Ret		19	16	18	15					16	15	15	13	17	15	17	17	7	26th	155	10th	285	4th
2026	Honda RC213V	M			THA	BRA	USA	SPA	FRA	CAT	ITA	HUN	CZE	NED	GER	GBR	ARA	RSM	AUT	JPN	INA	AUS	MAL	QAT	POR	VAL						
2026	Honda RC213V	M	5	(France) Johann Zarco	11	9	Ret^{9}	7^{8}	11	Ret^{5}							15**^{9}**	Ret	10**^{7}**	20**^{7}**	13	C	Ret	9**^{5}**			63*	17th*	141*	9th*	190*	4th*
2026	Honda RC213V	M	10	(Brazil) Diogo Moreira	13	13	13	17	Ret^{9}	9	10	6**^{7}**	11	14	11	10	9**^{7}**	Ret	15	Ret**^{2}**	16	C**^{8}**	Ret**^{8}**	Ret			78*	15th*	141*	9th*	190*	4th*
2026	Honda RC213V	M	35	(United Kingdom) Cal Crutchlow							Ret	16	17	16	Ret	Ret											0*	29th*	141*	9th*	190*	4th*
