= Solstice Sunglasses =

Retail company

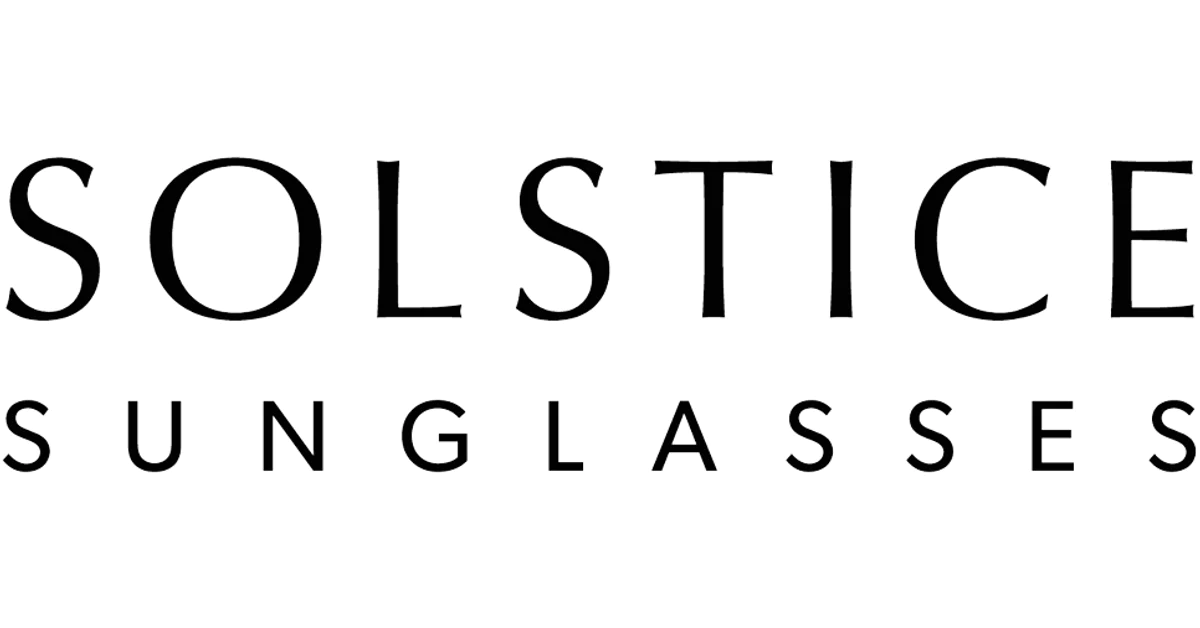
- Company type: Subsidiary
- Industry: Retail
- Founded: 2002; 24 years ago
- Headquarters: New York, New York, United States, U.S.
- Number of locations: 45 (2023)
- Products: Sunglasses, sunglass accessories
- Parent: Safilo Group (2002-2019); Fairway LLC (2019-present)
- Website: solsticesunglasses.com

Solstice Sunglasses (also known as Solstice Sunglass Boutique or simply Solstice) is a retailer of sunglasses and sunglass accessories founded in Secaucus, New Jersey in 2002.

== History ==
Safilo acquired Solstice in 2002 and sold it to Fairway LLC in 2019 for $9 million.

On February 18, 2021, Solstice, amongst its retail operator, Solstice Marketing Concepts, LLC, filed for Chapter 11 bankruptcy in the United States. During the filing, it had plans to shutter some of its retail footprint.

On August 5, 2021, Solstice exited from Chapter 11 bankruptcy after they got a $6.5 million lifeline from financial institution Second Avenue Capital Partners.

On December 15, 2022, non-bank capital lender GemCap Solutions provided a $7 million line of credit to Solstice. As of 2023, Solstice currently operates 45+ stores in the United States.

== Controversies ==
In 2020, Solstice was sued by the owner of the Palisades Center mall and its guarantors for refusal to pay rent for almost a year. The lawsuit states that Solstice owes the mall nearly $100,000, and that they have not paid rent since March 1, 2020. Their lease at this location was set to terminate on January 31, 2021.
