= Polaroid Eyewear =

Eyeware manufacturer

- Type: Subsidiary
- Industry: Eyewear
- Founded: 1937 (as part of Polaroid Corporation)
- Founder: Edwin H. Land
- Headquarters: Padua, Italy
- Products: Polarized sunglasses, polarized lenses, optical frames, reading glasses, clip-on lenses
- Parent: StyleMark (2007–2011); Petters Group Worldwide (2002–2007); Polaroid Corporation (1937–2001); Safilo Group (2011–present)
- Website: polaroideyewear.com

Polaroid Eyewear manufactures polarized sunglasses and polarized lenses, as well as optical frames, reading glasses, and clip-on lenses.

Polaroid Eyewear was a part of the StyleMark group and sold to the Safilo Group in November 2011. Polaroid headquarters is located in Padua (Italy).

== History ==
Edwin Land, born in 1909 in Connecticut, invented Polaroid, the world's first polarizing material for commercial use, in 1929. He founded the Polaroid Corporation in 1937 in Cambridge, Massachusetts. The company initially produced Polaroid Day Glasses, the first sunglasses with a polarizing filter.

In 1935 Land negotiated with American Optical Company to produce polarized sunglasses. Such glasses could screen out glare rather than simply darken the landscape. Land and Wheelwright contracted to begin production of Polaroid Day Glasses, a longtime source of revenue for Polaroid.

With venture capital from railroad tycoon W. Averell Harriman and merchant banker and part-time songwriter James P. Warburg, Edwin Land, George Wheelwright, and Julius Silver incorporated Polaroid Corporation on September 13, 1937. Polaroid began the manufacturing of polarizing sheet for windows in railroad observation cars.

In 1939 Day Glasses were the source of most of Polaroid's $35,000 profit, which introduced the first 3D movie glasses that same year. Although sales rose to $1 million in 1941, the company's 1940 losses had reached $100,000, and it was only World War II military contracts that saved Land and his 240 employees. By 1942 the wartime economy has tripled Polaroid's size. A $7 million navy contract to work on the Dove heat-seeking missile project is the largest contract Polaroid has ever had, though the bomb is not used during World War II.

Polaroid produced a number of other products for the Armed Forces, including a device that determined an aircraft's elevation above the horizon, an infrared night viewing device, goggles, lenses, color filters for periscopes, and range finders. At the beginning of its history Polaroid produced polarized sheets to be used for the elimination of automobile headlight glare. For the same reason sunglasses and filters were used by the American Army, especially for aviation, indeed Polaroid glasses were thought to protect aviator from sunlight but also atomic bomb explosions. Cool-Ray was a division of American Optical for the sunglasses. It was the originator of the polarized sunglass as it is known today. It manufactured the lenses using a process that was licensed from Polaroid Corporation. Cool-Ray paid Polaroid a royalty in the early 1940s.

In 1965 Polaroid moved its production to Vale of Leven in Scotland, a few years later in 1972 the production of sunglasses was added. It promotes a number of programs in the community on the health theme. Polaroid is the major sponsor of a series of 10K road races, which take place each June over various courses in West Dunbartonshire. In the next decades other plants were opened in Europe, South America and Far East.

In the 1960s the designer Oleg Cassini collaborated with Cool Ray and his influence is clear in many Polaroid models. In the 1980s, Polaroid launched aviator styles with interchangeable lenses in collaboration with tennis star Boris Becker. Kenneth Grange, renowned designer from Pentagram Design Partner, designed the unique IMAGE style in the 1980s.

The original Polaroid Corporation filed for federal bankruptcy protection on October 11, 2001. The outcome was that within ten months, most of the business (including the "Polaroid" name itself and non-bankrupt foreign subsidiaries) had been sold to Bank One's One Equity Partners (OEP). OEP Imaging Corporation then changed its name to Polaroid Holding Company (PHC). However, this new company operated using the name of its bankrupt predecessor, Polaroid Corporation.

Petters Group Worldwide, the owner of the Polaroid brand at the time, sold Polaroid Eyewear to specialist eyewear company StyleMark in March 2007. StyleMark is a global distributor of fashion, sport, and children's sunglasses.

In 2011, it was acquired by the Italian group Safilo. Following the acquisition, Safilo moved Polaroid Eyewear's production from Scotland to China and the historic Scottish production site in Dumbarton was completely dismantled. In 2023, the brand introduced a new logo.
