= 2015 Argentine Republic motorcycle Grand Prix =

(Argentina) 2015 Argentine Republic Grand Prix
Race details
- Race 3 of 18 races in the 2015 Grand Prix motorcycle racing season
- Date: 19 April 2015
- Official name: Gran Premio Red Bull de la República Argentina
- Location: Autódromo Termas de Río Hondo
- Course: Permanent racing facility; 4.806 km (2.986 mi)

MotoGP
Pole position
Rider	(Spain) Marc Márquez	Honda
Time	1:37.802	
Fastest lap
Rider	(Italy) Valentino Rossi	Yamaha
Time	1:39.019 on lap 20	
Podium
First	(Italy) Valentino Rossi	Yamaha
Second	(Italy) Andrea Dovizioso	Ducati
Third	(United Kingdom) Cal Crutchlow	Honda

Moto2
Pole position
Rider	(France) Johann Zarco	Kalex
Time	1:42.809	
Fastest lap
Rider	(Germany) Jonas Folger	Kalex
Time	1:43.001 on lap 23	
Podium
First	(France) Johann Zarco	Kalex
Second	(Spain) Álex Rins	Kalex
Third	(United Kingdom) Sam Lowes	Speed Up

Moto3
Pole position
Rider	(Portugal) Miguel Oliveira	KTM
Time	1:48.461	
Fastest lap
Rider	(Portugal) Miguel Oliveira	KTM
Time	1:48.977 on lap 7	
Podium
First	(United Kingdom) Danny Kent	Honda
Second	(Spain) Efrén Vázquez	Honda
Third	(Spain) Isaac Viñales	Husqvarna

The 2015 Argentine Republic motorcycle Grand Prix was the third round of the 2015 Grand Prix motorcycle racing season. It was held at the Autódromo Termas de Río Hondo in Santiago del Estero on 19 April 2015.

In the MotoGP class, Marc Márquez took his second pole position of the season. In the race, he started well and pulled away from the field to a maximum advantage of 4 seconds. However, Valentino Rossi closed in on Márquez, and on lap 22, immediately followed him. At Turn 5, Márquez made contact with Rossi, with Márquez's bike hitting Rossi's rear tyre. Márquez could not rejoin, and as a result, Rossi took his second win of the season. Andrea Dovizioso took his third successive second place, while Cal Crutchlow took LCR Honda's first podium since the 2013 United States Grand Prix with third place, after passing Andrea Iannone at the final corner. Crutchlow's teammate Jack Miller took his first win in the Open category with a twelfth-place finish, and aside from Márquez's retirement, Hiroshi Aoyama and Yonny Hernández were the only other riders not to make the finish.

== Classification ==
=== MotoGP ===
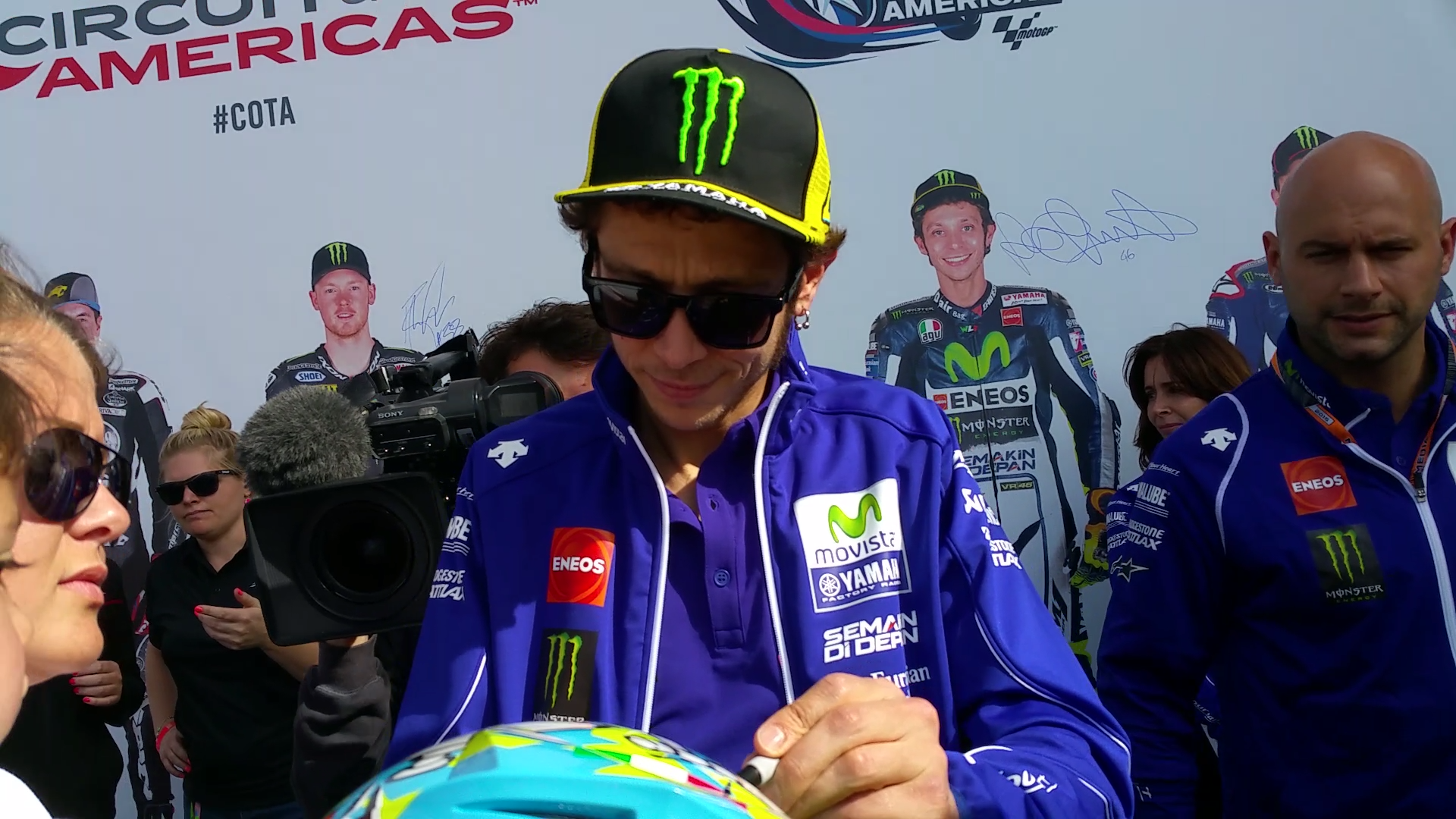
Valentino Rossi, pictured at the 2015 Grand Prix of the Americas, was the winner of the MotoGP race.

Pos.	No.	Rider	Team	Manufacturer	Laps	Time/Retired	Grid	Points
1	46	(Italy) Valentino Rossi	Movistar Yamaha MotoGP	Yamaha	25	41:35.644	8	25
2	4	(Italy) Andrea Dovizioso	Ducati Team	Ducati	25	+5.685	6	20
3	35	(United Kingdom) Cal Crutchlow	CWM LCR Honda	Honda	25	+8.298	4	16
4	29	(Italy) Andrea Iannone	Ducati Team	Ducati	25	+8.352	3	13
5	99	(Spain) Jorge Lorenzo	Movistar Yamaha MotoGP	Yamaha	25	+10.192	5	11
6	38	(United Kingdom) Bradley Smith	Monster Yamaha Tech 3	Yamaha	25	+19.876	10	10
7	41	(Spain) Aleix Espargaró	Team Suzuki Ecstar	Suzuki	25	+24.333	2	9
8	44	(Spain) Pol Espargaró	Monster Yamaha Tech 3	Yamaha	25	+27.670	18	8
9	45	(United Kingdom) Scott Redding	EG 0,0 Marc VDS	Honda	25	+34.397	11	7
10	25	(Spain) Maverick Viñales	Team Suzuki Ecstar	Suzuki	25	+34.808	9	6
11	9	(Italy) Danilo Petrucci	Pramac Racing	Ducati	25	+40.206	7	5
12	43	(Australia) Jack Miller	CWM LCR Honda	Honda	25	+42.654	21	4
13	8	(Spain) Héctor Barberá	Avintia Racing	Ducati	25	+42.729	12	3
14	76	(France) Loris Baz	Athinà Forward Racing	Yamaha Forward	25	+42.853	22	2
15	6	(Germany) Stefan Bradl	Athinà Forward Racing	Yamaha Forward	25	+43.037	16	1
16	69	(United States) Nicky Hayden	Aspar MotoGP Team	Honda	25	+43.252	20	
17	50	(Republic of Ireland) Eugene Laverty	Aspar MotoGP Team	Honda	25	+43.400	14	
18	63	(France) Mike Di Meglio	Avintia Racing	Ducati	25	+43.808	23	
19	19	(Spain) Álvaro Bautista	Aprilia Racing Team Gresini	Aprilia	25	+44.878	19	
20	33	(Italy) Marco Melandri	Aprilia Racing Team Gresini	Aprilia	25	+56.236	24	
21	17	(Czech Republic) Karel Abraham	AB Motoracing	Honda	25	+1:03.371	17	
22	15	(San Marino) Alex de Angelis	Octo IodaRacing Team	ART	25	+1:08.444	25	
Ret	7	(Japan) Hiroshi Aoyama	Repsol Honda Team	Honda	24	Accident	15	
Ret	93	(Spain) Marc Márquez	Repsol Honda Team	Honda	23	Accident	1	
Ret	68	(Colombia) Yonny Hernández	Pramac Racing	Ducati	6	Retirement	13	

=== Moto2 ===
Pos.	No.	Rider	Manufacturer	Laps	Time/Retired	Grid	Points
1	5	(France) Johann Zarco	Kalex	23	39:44.497	1	25
2	40	(Spain) Álex Rins	Kalex	23	+2.715	5	20
3	22	(United Kingdom) Sam Lowes	Speed Up	23	+4.161	4	16
4	36	(Finland) Mika Kallio	Kalex	23	+5.310	10	13
5	21	(Italy) Franco Morbidelli	Kalex	23	+7.958	22	11
6	12	(Switzerland) Thomas Lüthi	Kalex	23	+9.408	3	10
7	11	(Germany) Sandro Cortese	Kalex	23	+9.926	8	9
8	7	(Italy) Lorenzo Baldassarri	Kalex	23	+10.028	13	8
9	94	(Germany) Jonas Folger	Kalex	23	+10.152	6	7
10	55	(Malaysia) Hafizh Syahrin	Kalex	23	+11.316	16	6
11	39	(Spain) Luis Salom	Kalex	23	+11.764	18	5
12	1	(Spain) Tito Rabat	Kalex	23	+11.872	2	4
13	77	(Switzerland) Dominique Aegerter	Kalex	23	+14.005	17	3
14	95	(Australia) Anthony West	Speed Up	23	+20.788	19	2
15	73	(Spain) Álex Márquez	Kalex	23	+21.321	20	1
16	23	(Germany) Marcel Schrötter	Tech 3	23	+25.693	12	
17	25	(Malaysia) Azlan Shah	Kalex	23	+26.537	25	
18	88	(Spain) Ricard Cardús	Tech 3	23	+26.686	21	
19	44	(South Africa) Steven Odendaal	Kalex	23	+27.397	26	
20	30	(Japan) Takaaki Nakagami	Kalex	23	+27.779	15	
21	4	(Switzerland) Randy Krummenacher	Kalex	23	+28.559	11	
22	19	(Belgium) Xavier Siméon	Kalex	23	+35.988	9	
23	70	(Switzerland) Robin Mulhauser	Kalex	23	+36.457	24	
24	10	(Thailand) Thitipong Warokorn	Kalex	23	+46.710	27	
25	66	(Germany) Florian Alt	Suter	23	+47.522	28	
26	60	(Spain) Julián Simón	Speed Up	23	+1:02.910	14	
27	51	(Malaysia) Zaqhwan Zaidi	Suter	23	+1:06.741	30	
28	2	(Switzerland) Jesko Raffin	Kalex	23	+1:06.839	29	
Ret	96	(France) Louis Rossi	Tech 3	18	Retirement	23	
Ret	3	(Italy) Simone Corsi	Kalex	1	Accident	7	
OFFICIAL MOTO2 REPORT

=== Moto3 ===
Pos.	No.	Rider	Manufacturer	Laps	Time/Retired	Grid	Points
1	52	(United Kingdom) Danny Kent	Honda	21	38:25.621	2	25
2	7	(Spain) Efrén Vázquez	Honda	21	+10.334	4	20
3	32	(Spain) Isaac Viñales	Husqvarna	21	+10.396	5	16
4	44	(Portugal) Miguel Oliveira	KTM	21	+10.767	1	13
5	41	(South Africa) Brad Binder	KTM	21	+11.117	14	11
6	20	(France) Fabio Quartararo	Honda	21	+11.195	15	10
7	98	(Czech Republic) Karel Hanika	KTM	21	+11.388	6	9
8	5	(Italy) Romano Fenati	KTM	21	+11.603	34	8
9	33	(Italy) Enea Bastianini	Honda	21	+11.712	9	7
10	31	(Finland) Niklas Ajo	KTM	21	+11.806	16	6
11	21	(Italy) Francesco Bagnaia	Mahindra	21	+11.958	17	5
12	11	(Belgium) Livio Loi	Honda	21	+12.355	10	4
13	76	(Japan) Hiroki Ono	Honda	21	+12.501	8	3
14	84	(Czech Republic) Jakub Kornfeil	KTM	21	+12.644	19	2
15	17	(United Kingdom) John McPhee	Honda	21	+12.772	18	1
16	65	(Germany) Philipp Öttl	KTM	21	+22.477	20	
17	16	(Italy) Andrea Migno	KTM	21	+23.352	13	
18	29	(Italy) Stefano Manzi	Mahindra	21	+28.746	25	
19	2	(Australia) Remy Gardner	Mahindra	21	+30.409	26	
20	63	(Malaysia) Zulfahmi Khairuddin	KTM	21	+30.644	27	
21	12	(Italy) Matteo Ferrari	Mahindra	21	+30.786	24	
22	88	(Spain) Jorge Martín	Mahindra	21	+44.095	22	
23	55	(Italy) Andrea Locatelli	Honda	21	+45.153	28	
24	40	(South Africa) Darryn Binder	Mahindra	21	+49.149	29	
25	19	(Italy) Alessandro Tonucci	Mahindra	21	+51.073	30	
26	22	(Spain) Ana Carrasco	KTM	21	+56.185	32	
27	24	(Japan) Tatsuki Suzuki	Mahindra	21	+1:01.461	31	
28	91	(Argentina) Gabriel Rodrigo	KTM	20	+1 lap	33	
Ret	9	(Spain) Jorge Navarro	Honda	15	Retirement	7	
Ret	58	(Spain) Juan Francisco Guevara	Mahindra	12	Retirement	11	
Ret	10	(France) Alexis Masbou	Honda	7	Retirement	12	
Ret	23	(Italy) Niccolò Antonelli	Honda	4	Accident	3	
Ret	95	(France) Jules Danilo	Honda	3	Accident	21	
Ret	6	(Spain) María Herrera	Husqvarna	0	Accident	23	
OFFICIAL MOTO3 REPORT

== Championship standings after the race (MotoGP) ==
Below are the standings for the top five riders and constructors after round three has concluded.

Riders' Championship standings

Pos.	Rider	Points
1	(Italy) Valentino Rossi	66
2	(Italy) Andrea Dovizioso	60
3	(Italy) Andrea Iannone	40
4	(Spain) Jorge Lorenzo	37
5	(Spain) Marc Márquez	36

Constructors' Championship standings

Pos.	Constructor	Points
1	(Japan) Yamaha	66
2	(Italy) Ducati	60
3	(Japan) Honda	52
4	(Japan) Suzuki	22
5	(Switzerland) Yamaha Forward	2

Teams' Championship standings

Pos.	Team	Points
1	(Japan) Movistar Yamaha MotoGP	103
2	(Italy) Ducati Team	100
3	(Japan) Repsol Honda Team	51
4	(France) Monster Yamaha Tech 3	43
5	(Monaco) CWM LCR Honda	40

- Note: Only the top five positions are included for all sets of standings.

Previous race: 2015 Grand Prix of the Americas	FIM Grand Prix World Championship; 2015 season	Next race: 2015 Spanish Grand Prix
Previous race: 2014 Argentine Grand Prix	Argentine Republic motorcycle Grand Prix	Next race: 2016 Argentine Grand Prix
