= 2025 Dutch TT =

Motorcycle races in Assen

(Netherlands) 2025 Dutch TT
Race details
- Race 10 of 22 races in the 2025 Grand Prix motorcycle racing season
- Date: 28–29 June 2025
- Official name: Motul Grand Prix of the Netherlands
- Location: TT Circuit Assen; Assen, Netherlands
- Course: Permanent racing facility; 4.542 km (2.822 mi)

MotoGP
Pole position
Rider	(France) Fabio Quartararo	Yamaha
Time	1:30.651	
Fastest lap
Rider	(Italy) Francesco Bagnaia	Ducati
Time	1:32.220 on lap 16	
Podium
First	(Spain) Marc Márquez	Ducati
Second	(Italy) Marco Bezzecchi	Aprilia
Third	(Italy) Francesco Bagnaia	Ducati

Moto2
Pole position
Rider	(Brazil) Diogo Moreira	Kalex
Time	1:34.777	
Fastest lap
Rider	(Brazil) Diogo Moreira	Kalex
Time	1:35.580 on lap 3	
Podium
First	(Brazil) Diogo Moreira	Kalex
Second	(Spain) Arón Canet	Kalex
Third	(Spain) Manuel González	Kalex

Moto3
Pole position
Rider	(Spain) José Antonio Rueda	KTM
Time	1:39.757	
Fastest lap
Rider	(Australia) Joel Kelso	KTM
Time	1:40.395 on lap 12	
Podium
First	(Spain) José Antonio Rueda	KTM
Second	(Spain) David Muñoz	KTM
Third	(Argentina) Valentín Perrone	KTM

MotoE Race 1
Pole position
Rider	(Italy) Mattia Casadei	Ducati
Time	1:39.943	
Fastest lap
Rider	(Italy) Andrea Mantovani	Ducati
Time	1:39.723 on lap 5	
Podium
First	(Italy) Andrea Mantovani	Ducati
Second	(Italy) Alessandro Zaccone	Ducati
Third	(Spain) Jordi Torres	Ducati

MotoE Race 2
Pole position
Rider	(Italy) Mattia Casadei	Ducati
Time	1:39.943	
Fastest lap
Rider	(Italy) Alessandro Zaccone	Ducati
Time	1:39.592 on lap 4	
Podium
First	(Italy) Alessandro Zaccone	Ducati
Second	(Italy) Andrea Mantovani	Ducati
Third	(Italy) Lorenzo Baldassarri	Ducati

The 2025 Dutch TT (officially known as the Motul Grand Prix of the Netherlands) was the tenth round of the 2025 Grand Prix motorcycle racing season and the second round of the 2025 MotoE World Championship. All races (except for both MotoE races which were held on 28 June) were held at the TT Circuit Assen in Assen on 29 June 2025.

== Background ==
The 100th anniversary of the TT Circuit Assen was part of the 2025 Dutch MotoGP, which took place on June 27-29. The Assen circuit is the only circuit that has always been included in the MotoGP calendar since 1949, except in 2020 due to the pandemic. This 100th anniversary was a special moment for MotoGP fans around the world.

In addition, Yamaha celebrated their 70th anniversary by displaying a special livery inspired by the 1999 YZF-R7. The 2025 Dutch MotoGP at the Assen Circuit was a double celebration, namely the 100th anniversary of racing at Assen and the celebration of Yamaha's 70th anniversary.

Marc Márquez achieved his 68th victory in the main class in this race, tying with Giacomo Agostini and now behind only Valentino Rossi who has 89 victories in the main class.

== Practice session ==
=== MotoGP ===
==== Combined Free Practice 1-2 ====
Fastest session lap

Pos.	No.	Biker	Team	Constructor	Practice times	
Pos.	No.	Biker	Team	Constructor	P1	P2
1	20	(France) Fabio Quartararo	Monster Energy Yamaha MotoGP Team	Yamaha	1:32.956	**1:31.876**
2	63	(Italy) Francesco Bagnaia	Ducati Lenovo Team	Ducati	1:32.609	1:32.050
3	37	(Spain) Pedro Acosta	Red Bull KTM Factory Racing	KTM	1:33.181	1:32.070
4	72	(Italy) Marco Bezzecchi	Aprilia Racing	Aprilia	1:32.570	1:32.136
5	93	(Spain) Marc Márquez	Ducati Lenovo Team	Ducati	**1:32.216**	1:32.187
6	12	(Spain) Maverick Viñales	Red Bull KTM Tech3	KTM	1:32.529	1:32.364
7	21	(Italy) Franco Morbidelli	Pertamina Enduro VR46 Racing Team	Ducati	1:33.264	1:32.364
8	54	(Spain) Fermín Aldeguer	BK8 Gresini Racing MotoGP	Ducati	1:33.149	1:32.374
9	73	(Spain) Álex Márquez	BK8 Gresini Racing MotoGP	Ducati	1:33.115	1:32.384
10	49	(Italy) Fabio Di Giannantonio	Pertamina Enduro VR46 Racing Team	Ducati	1:32.889	1:32.402
11	88	(Portugal) Miguel Oliveira	Prima Pramac Yamaha MotoGP	Yamaha	1:33.378	1:32.430
12	25	(Spain) Raúl Fernández	Trackhouse MotoGP Team	Aprilia	1:33.231	1:32.507
13	42	(Spain) Álex Rins	Monster Energy Yamaha MotoGP Team	Yamaha	1:33.151	1:32.530
14	79	(Japan) Ai Ogura	Trackhouse MotoGP Team	Aprilia	1:33.823	1:32.596
15	23	(Italy) Enea Bastianini	Red Bull KTM Tech3	KTM	1:33.615	1:32.633
16	43	(Australia) Jack Miller	Prima Pramac Yamaha MotoGP	Yamaha	1:33.339	1:32.666
17	36	(Spain) Joan Mir	Honda HRC Castrol	Honda	1:33.423	1:32.763
18	5	(France) Johann Zarco	Castrol Honda LCR	Honda	1:33.144	1:32.852
19	33	(South Africa) Brad Binder	Red Bull KTM Factory Racing	KTM	1:33.923	1:32.873
20	41	(Spain) Aleix Espargaró	Honda HRC Castrol	Honda	1:34.295	1:33.100
21	32	(Italy) Lorenzo Savadori	Aprilia Racing	Aprilia	1:33.622	1:33.248
22	35	(Thailand) Somkiat Chantra	IDEMITSU Honda LCR	Honda	1:34.809	1:34.157
OFFICIAL MOTOGP COMBINED PRACTICE TIMES REPORT

==== Practice ====
The top ten riders (written in bold) qualified for Q2.

Fastest session lap

Pos.	No.	Biker	Team	Constructor	
Pos.	No.	Biker	Team	Constructor	Time results
1	**20**	**(France) Fabio Quartararo**	**Monster Energy Yamaha MotoGP Team**	**Yamaha**	**1:31.156**
2	**73**	**(Spain) Álex Márquez**	**BK8 Gresini Racing MotoGP**	**Ducati**	**1:31.258**
3	**37**	**(Spain) Pedro Acosta**	**Red Bull KTM Factory Racing**	**KTM**	**1:31.349**
4	**72**	**(Italy) Marco Bezzecchi**	**Aprilia Racing**	**Aprilia**	**1:31.352**
5	**63**	**(Italy) Francesco Bagnaia**	**Ducati Lenovo Team**	**Ducati**	**1:31.410**
6	**93**	**(Spain) Marc Márquez**	**Ducati Lenovo Team**	**Ducati**	**1:31.455**
7	**49**	**(Italy) Fabio Di Giannantonio**	**Pertamina Enduro VR46 Racing Team**	**Ducati**	**1:31.528**
8	**12**	**(Spain) Maverick Viñales**	**Red Bull KTM Tech3**	**KTM**	**1:31.604**
9	**21**	**(Italy) Franco Morbidelli**	**Pertamina Enduro VR46 Racing Team**	**Ducati**	**1:31.748**
10	**5**	**(France) Johann Zarco**	**CASTROL Honda LCR**	**Honda**	**1:31.776**
11	25	(Spain) Raúl Fernández	Trackhouse MotoGP Team	Aprilia	1:31.777
12	54	(Spain) Fermín Aldeguer	BK8 Gresini Racing MotoGP	Ducati	1:31.805
13	42	(Spain) Álex Rins	Monster Energy Yamaha MotoGP Team	Yamaha	1:31.831
14	88	(Portugal) Miguel Oliveira	Prima Pramac Yamaha MotoGP	Yamaha	1:31.942
15	23	(Italy) Enea Bastianini	Red Bull KTM Tech3	KTM	1:31.953
16	43	(Australia) Jack Miller	Prima Pramac Yamaha MotoGP	Yamaha	1:31.992
17	36	(Spain) Joan Mir	Honda HRC Castrol	Honda	1:32.023
18	33	(South Africa) Brad Binder	Red Bull KTM Factory Racing	KTM	1:32.366
19	32	(Italy) Lorenzo Savadori	Aprilia Racing	Aprilia	1:32.452
20	79	(Japan) Ai Ogura	Trackhouse MotoGP Team	Aprilia	1:32.617
21	35	(Thailand) Somkiat Chantra	IDEMITSU Honda LCR	Honda	1:33.114
22	41	(Spain) Aleix Espargaró	Honda HRC Castrol	Honda	1:33.249
OFFICIAL MOTOGP PRACTICE TIMES REPORT

=== Moto2 ===
==== Combined Practice 1-2 ====
Fastest session lap

Pos.	No.	Biker	Team	Constructor	Practice times	
Pos.	No.	Biker	Team	Constructor	P1	P2
1	4	(Spain) Iván Ortolá	QJMotor – Frinsa – MSi	Boscoscuro	1:37.061	**1:35.565**
2	44	(Spain) Arón Canet	Fantic Racing Lino Sonego	Kalex	1:36.404	1:35.570
3	18	(Spain) Manuel González	Liqui Moly Dynavolt Intact GP	Kalex	1:36.035	1:35.598
4	7	(Belgium) Barry Baltus	Fantic Racing Lino Sonego	Kalex	1:36.630	1:35.634
5	81	(Australia) Senna Agius	Liqui Moly Dynavolt Intact GP	Kalex	1:36.412	1:35.699
6	75	(Spain) Albert Arenas	Italjet Gresini Moto2	Kalex	1:36.091	1:35.701
7	96	(United Kingdom) Jake Dixon	Elf Marc VDS Racing Team	Boscoscuro	1:36.663	1:35.882
8	21	(Spain) Alonso López	Folladore SpeedRS Team	Boscoscuro	**1:36.025**	1:36.138
9	24	(Spain) Marcos Ramírez	OnlyFans American Racing Team	Kalex	1:36.969	1:36.028
10	12	(Czech Republic) Filip Salač	Elf Marc VDS Racing Team	Boscoscuro	1:36.610	1:36.042
11	10	(Brazil) Diogo Moreira	Italtrans Racing Team	Kalex	1:37.106	1:36.077
12	14	(Italy) Tony Arbolino	Blu Cru Pramac Yamaha Moto2	Boscoscuro	1:36.117	1:36.441
13	16	(United States) Joe Roberts	OnlyFans American Racing Team	Kalex	1:37.297	1:36.199
14	28	(Spain) Izan Guevara	Blu Cru Pramac Yamaha Moto2	Boscoscuro	1:37.117	1:36.223
15	11	(Spain) Alex Escrig	Klint Forward Factory Team	Forward	1:37.214	1:36.267
16	95	(Netherlands) Collin Veijer	Red Bull KTM Ajo	Kalex	1:38.548	1:36.287
17	13	(Italy) Celestino Vietti	Folladore SpeedRS Team	Boscoscuro	1:36.767	1:36.290
18	27	(Spain) Daniel Holgado	CFMoto Inde Aspar Team	Kalex	1:37.442	1:36.298
19	84	(Netherlands) Zonta van den Goorbergh	RW-Idrofoglia Racing GP	Kalex	1:36.958	1:36.336
20	71	(Japan) Ayumu Sasaki	RW-Idrofoglia Racing GP	Kalex	1:37.025	1:36.338
21	53	(Turkey) Deniz Öncü	Red Bull KTM Ajo	Kalex	1:37.323	1:36.458
22	15	(South Africa) Darryn Binder	Italjet Gresini Moto2	Kalex	1:37.272	1:36.623
23	80	(Colombia) David Alonso	CFMoto Inde Aspar Team	Kalex	1:37.925	1:36.739
24	99	(Spain) Adrián Huertas	Italtrans Racing Team	Kalex	1:37.401	1:36.755
25	9	(Spain) Jorge Navarro	Klint Forward Factory Team	Forward	1:37.177	1:37.348
26	92	(Japan) Yuki Kunii	Idemitsu Honda Team Asia	Kalex	1:38.184	1:37.209
27	41	(Thailand) Nakarin Atiratphuvapat	Idemitsu Honda Team Asia	Kalex	1:39.819	1:37.781
28	61	(Spain) Eric Fernández	QJMotor – Frinsa – MSi	Boscoscuro	1:39.229	1:38.478
OFFICIAL MOTO2 FREE PRACTICE TIMES REPORT

==== Practice ====
The top 14 riders (written in bold) qualified for Q2.

Pos.	No.	Biker	Team	Constructor	Time results					
Pos.	No.	Biker	Team	Constructor	1	12	(Czech Republic) **Filip Salač**	**Elf Marc VDS Racing Team**	**Boscoscuro**	**1:34.869**
2	44	(Spain) **Arón Canet**	**Fantic Racing Lino Sonego**	**Kalex**	1:35.215					
3	18	(Spain) **Manuel González**	**Liqui Moly Dynavolt Intact GP**	**Kalex**	1:35.304					
4	14	(Italy) **Tony Arbolino**	**Blu Cru Pramac Yamaha Moto2**	**Boscoscuro**	1:35.414					
5	4	(Spain) **Iván Ortolá**	**QJMotor – Frinsa – MSi**	**Boscoscuro**	1:35.498					
6	16	(United States) **Joe Roberts**	**OnlyFans American Racing Team**	**Kalex**	1:35.556					
7	28	(Spain) **Izan Guevara**	**Blu Cru Pramac Yamaha Moto2**	**Boscoscuro**	1:35.557					
8	96	(United Kingdom) **Jake Dixon**	**Elf Marc VDS Racing Team**	**Boscoscuro**	1:35.687					
9	24	(Spain) **Marcos Ramírez**	**OnlyFans American Racing Team**	**Kalex**	1:35.732					
10	21	(Spain) **Alonso López**	**Folladore SpeedRS Team**	**Boscoscuro**	1:35.747					
11	10	(Brazil) **Diogo Moreira**	**Italtrans Racing Team**	**Kalex**	1:35.842					
12	81	(Australia) **Senna Agius**	**Liqui Moly Dynavolt Intact GP**	**Kalex**	1:35.875					
13	13	(Italy) **Celestino Vietti**	**Folladore SpeedRS Team**	**Boscoscuro**	1:35.978					
14	75	(Spain) **Albert Arenas**	**Italjet Gresini Moto2**	**Kalex**	1:35.981					
15	84	(Netherlands) Zonta van den Goorbergh	RW-Idrofoglia Racing GP	Kalex	1:36.035					
16	7	(Belgium) Barry Baltus	Fantic Racing Lino Sonego	Kalex	1:36.064					
17	71	(Japan) Ayumu Sasaki	RW-Idrofoglia Racing GP	Kalex	1:36.145					
18	99	(Spain) Adrián Huertas	Italtrans Racing Team	Kalex	1:36.198					
19	27	(Spain) Daniel Holgado	CFMoto Inde Aspar Team	Kalex	1:36.224					
20	80	(Colombia) David Alonso	CFMoto Inde Aspar Team	Kalex	1:36.226					
21	9	(Spain) Jorge Navarro	Klint Forward Factory Team	Forward	1:36.229					
22	15	(South Africa) Darryn Binder	Italjet Gresini Moto2	Kalex	1:36.258					
23	53	(Turkey) Deniz Öncü	Red Bull KTM Ajo	Kalex	1:36.277					
24	11	(Spain) Alex Escrig	Klint Forward Factory Team	Forward	1:36.367					
25	95	(Netherlands) Collin Veijer	Red Bull KTM Ajo	Kalex	1:36.837					
26	92	(Japan) Yuki Kunii	Idemitsu Honda Team Asia	Kalex	1:36.886					
27	61	(Spain) Eric Fernández	QJMotor – Frinsa – MSi	Boscoscuro	1:37.481					
28	41	(Thailand) Nakarin Atiratphuvapat	Idemitsu Honda Team Asia	Kalex	1:37.813					
OFFICIAL MOTO2 PRACTICE TIMES REPORT

=== Moto3 ===
==== Combined Practice 1-2 ====
Fastest session lap

Pos.	No.	Biker	Team	Constructor	Practice times	
Pos.	No.	Biker	Team	Constructor	P1	P2
1	22	(Spain) David Almansa	Leopard Racing	Honda	1:48.667	**1:40.259**
2	31	(Spain) Adrián Fernández	Leopard Racing	Honda	1:46.572	1:40.485
3	99	(Spain) José Antonio Rueda	Red Bull KTM Ajo	KTM	1:47.515	1:40.485
4	83	(Spain) Álvaro Carpe	Red Bull KTM Ajo	KTM	**1:46.078**	1:40.520
5	12	(Australia) Jacob Roulstone	Red Bull KTM Tech3	KTM	1:50.840	1:40.528
6	58	(Italy) Luca Lunetta	Sic58 Squadra Corse	Honda	1:47.096	1:40.555
7	28	(Spain) Máximo Quiles	CFMoto Gaviota Aspar Team	KTM	1:46.189	1:40.558
8	82	(Italy) Stefano Nepa	Sic58 Squadra Corse	Honda	1:48.988	1:40.587
9	71	(Italy) Dennis Foggia	CFMoto Gaviota Aspar Team	KTM	1:50.239	1:40.843
10	5	(Thailand) Tatchakorn Buasri	Honda Team Asia	Honda	1:49.020	1:40.894
11	19	(United Kingdom) Scott Ogden	CIP Green Power	KTM	1:47.731	1:40.988
12	66	(Australia) Joel Kelso	LEVELUP-MTA	KTM	1:47.913	1:41.005
13	64	(Spain) David Muñoz	Liqui Moly Dynavolt Intact GP	KTM	1:46.807	1:41.016
14	89	(Spain) Marcos Uriarte	LEVELUP-MTA	KTM	1:48.447	1:41.140
15	94	(Italy) Guido Pini	Liqui Moly Dynavolt Intact GP	KTM	1:46.983	1:41.150
16	6	(Japan) Ryusei Yamanaka	Frinsa – MT Helmets – MSI	KTM	1:48.067	1:41.160
17	14	(New Zealand) Cormac Buchanan	Denssi Racing – BOE	KTM	1:46.531	1:41.197
18	72	(Japan) Taiyo Furusato	Honda Team Asia	Honda	1:48.776	1:41.241
19	73	(Argentina) Valentín Perrone	Red Bull KTM Tech3	KTM	1:47.335	1:41.371
20	10	(Italy) Nicola Carraro	Rivacold Snipers Team	Honda	1:47.882	1:41.409
21	25	(Italy) Leonardo Abruzzo	GRYD - Mlav Racing	Honda	1:49.507	1:41.504
22	54	(Italy) Riccardo Rossi	Rivacold Snipers Team	Honda	1:48.580	1:41.610
23	8	(United Kingdom) Eddie O'Shea	GRYD - Mlav Racing	Honda	1:48.580	1:41.876
24	36	(Spain) Ángel Piqueras	Frinsa – MT Helmets – MSI	KTM	1:46.457	1:41.915
25	55	(Switzerland) Noah Dettwiler	CIP Green Power	KTM	1:48.807	1:42.325
26	34	(Austria) Jakob Rosenthaler	Denssi Racing – BOE	KTM	1:49.844	1:42.695
OFFICIAL MOTO3 FREE PRACTICE TIMES REPORT

==== Practice ====
The top 14 riders (written in bold) qualified for Q2.

Pos.	No.	Biker	Team	Constructor	Practice times					
Pos.	No.	Biker	Team	Constructor	1	58	(Italy) **Luca Lunetta**	**Sic58 Squadra Corse**	**Honda**	**1:40.053**
2	64	(Spain) **David Muñoz**	**Liqui Moly Dynavolt Intact GP**	**KTM**	1:40.262					
3	66	(Australia) **Joel Kelso**	**LEVELUP-MTA**	**KTM**	1:40.445					
4	99	(Spain) **José Antonio Rueda**	**Red Bull KTM Ajo**	**KTM**	1:40.455					
5	73	(Argentina) **Valentín Perrone**	**Red Bull KTM Tech3**	**KTM**	1:40.462					
6	22	(Spain) **David Almansa**	**Leopard Racing**	**Honda**	1:40.563					
7	19	(United Kingdom) **Scott Ogden**	**CIP Green Power**	**KTM**	1:40.579					
8	71	(Italy) **Dennis Foggia**	**CFMoto Gaviota Aspar Team**	**KTM**	1:40.633					
9	31	(Spain) **Adrián Fernández**	**Leopard Racing**	**Honda**	1:40.636					
10	54	(Italy) **Riccardo Rossi**	**Rivacold Snipers Team**	**Honda**	1:40.644					
11	12	(Australia) **Jacob Roulstone**	**Red Bull KTM Tech3**	**KTM**	1:40.650					
12	10	(Italy) **Nicola Carraro**	**Rivacold Snipers Team**	**Honda**	1:40.655					
13	94	(Italy) **Guido Pini**	**Liqui Moly Dynavolt Intact GP**	**KTM**	1:40.704					
14	36	(Spain) **Ángel Piqueras**	**Frinsa – MT Helmets – MSI**	**KTM**	1:40.731					
15	82	(Italy) Stefano Nepa	Sic58 Squadra Corse	Honda	1:40.772					
16	89	(Spain) Marcos Uriarte	LEVELUP-MTA	KTM	1:40.780					
17	72	(Japan) Taiyo Furusato	Honda Team Asia	Honda	1:40.837					
18	83	(Spain) Álvaro Carpe	Red Bull KTM Ajo	KTM	1:40.850					
19	6	(Japan) Ryusei Yamanaka	Frinsa – MT Helmets – MSI	KTM	1:40.951					
20	28	(Spain) Máximo Quiles	CFMoto Gaviota Aspar Team	KTM	1:41.012					
21	5	(Thailand) Tatchakorn Buasri	Honda Team Asia	Honda	1:41.366					
22	55	(Switzerland) Noah Dettwiler	CIP Green Power	KTM	1:41.673					
23	14	(New Zealand) Cormac Buchanan	Denssi Racing – BOE	KTM	1:41.923					
24	25	(Italy) Leonardo Abruzzo	GRYD - Mlav Racing	Honda	1:41.939					
25	34	(Austria) Jakob Rosenthaler	Denssi Racing – BOE	KTM	1:42.716					
26	8	(United Kingdom) Eddie O'Shea	GRYD - Mlav Racing	Honda	1:42.725					
OFFICIAL MOTO3 PRACTICE TIMES REPORT

=== MotoE ===
==== Free Practice ====
Pos.	No.	Biker	Team	Constructor	Practice times					
Pos.	No.	Biker	Team	Constructor	1	81	(Spain) Jordi Torres	Power Electronics Aspar Team	Ducati	**1:48.697**
2	51	(Brazil) Eric Granado	LCR E-Team	Ducati	1:49.000					
3	7	(Italy) Lorenzo Baldassarri	Dynavolt Intact GP	Ducati	1:49.185					
4	1	(Spain) Héctor Garzó	Dynavolt Intact GP	Ducati	1:49.248					
5	21	(Italy) Kevin Zannoni	Power Electronics Aspar Team	Ducati	1:49.302					
6	72	(Italy) Alessio Finello	Felo Gresini MotoE	Ducati	1:49.455					
7	11	(Italy) Matteo Ferrari	Felo Gresini MotoE	Ducati	1:49.666					
8	40	(Italy) Mattia Casadei	LCR E-Team	Ducati	1:49.959					
9	9	(Italy) Andrea Mantovani	KLINT Forward Factory Team	Ducati	1:51.130					
10	61	(Italy) Alessandro Zaccone	Aruba Cloud MotoE Team	Ducati	1:51.433					
11	29	(Italy) Nicholas Spinelli	Rivacold Snipers Team MotoE	Ducati	1:51.771					
12	77	(Italy) Raffaele Fusco	Ongetta Sic58 Squadra Corse	Ducati	1:52.265					
13	47	(Hungary) Tibor Erik Varga	Rivacold Snipers Team MotoE	Ducati	1:52.427					
14	19	(San Marino) Luca Bernardi	Aruba Cloud MotoE Team	Ducati	1:53.409					
15	35	(Spain) Diego Pérez	MSI Racing Team	Ducati	1:54.028					
16	6	(Spain) María Herrera	KLINT Forward Factory Team	Ducati	1:54.356					
17	12	(Romania) Jacopo Hosciuc	MSI Racing Team	Ducati	1:54.755					
18	28	(Italy) Tommaso Occhi	Ongetta Sic58 Squadra Corse	Ducati	1:56.715					
OFFICIAL MOTOE FREE PRACTICE TIMES REPORT

==== Practice ====
The top 8 riders (written in bold) qualified for Q2.

Pos.	No.	Biker	Team	Constructor	Practice times					
Pos.	No.	Biker	Team	Constructor	1	81	(Spain) **Jordi Torres**	**Power Electronics Aspar Team**	**Ducati**	**1:40.109**
2	40	**(Italy) Mattia Casadei**	**LCR E-Team**	**Ducati**	1:40.278					
3	61	**(Italy) Alessandro Zaccone**	**Aruba Cloud MotoE Team**	**Ducati**	1:40.318					
4	11	**(Italy) Matteo Ferrari**	**Felo Gresini MotoE**	**Ducati**	1:40.427					
5	51	**(Brazil) Eric Granado**	**LCR E-Team**	**Ducati**	1:40.534					
6	29	**(Italy) Nicholas Spinelli**	**Rivacold Snipers Team MotoE**	**Ducati**	1:40.564					
7	1	**(Spain) Héctor Garzó**	**Dynavolt Intact GP**	**Ducati**	1:40.810					
8	7	**(Italy) Lorenzo Baldassarri**	**Dynavolt Intact GP**	**Ducati**	1:40.887					
9	9	(Italy) Andrea Mantovani	KLINT Forward Factory Team	Ducati	1:40.906					
10	21	(Italy) Kevin Zannoni	Power Electronics Aspar Team	Ducati	1:41.043					
11	12	(Romania) Jacopo Hosciuc	MSI Racing Team	Ducati	1:41.697					
12	19	(San Marino) Luca Bernardi	Aruba Cloud MotoE Team	Ducati	1:41.961					
13	72	(Italy) Alessio Finello	Felo Gresini MotoE	Ducati	1:42.001					
14	6	(Spain) María Herrera	KLINT Forward Factory Team	Ducati	1:42.344					
15	47	(Hungary) Tibor Erik Varga	Rivacold Snipers Team MotoE	Ducati	1:42.439					
16	28	(Italy) Tommaso Occhi	Ongetta Sic58 Squadra Corse	Ducati	1:44.160					
17	77	(Italy) Raffaele Fusco	Ongetta Sic58 Squadra Corse	Ducati	1:44.775					
18	35	(Spain) Diego Pérez	MSI Racing Team	Ducati	1:44.844					
OFFICIAL MOTOE PRACTICE TIMES REPORT

== Qualifying ==
=== MotoGP ===
Fastest session lap

Pos.	No.	Biker	Team	Constructor	Qualifying times		Final grid	Row
Pos.	No.	Biker	Team	Constructor	Q1	Q2	Final grid	Row
1	20	(France) Fabio Quartararo	Monster Energy Yamaha MotoGP Team	Yamaha	Qualified in Q2	1:30.651	1	1
2	63	(Italy) Francesco Bagnaia	Ducati Lenovo Team	Ducati	Qualified in Q2	1:30.679	2	1
3	73	(Spain) Álex Márquez	BK8 Gresini Racing MotoGP	Ducati	Qualified in Q2	1:30.811	3	1
4	93	(Spain) Marc Márquez	Ducati Lenovo Team	Ducati	Qualified in Q2	1:30.871	4	2
5	72	(Italy) Marco Bezzecchi	Aprilia Racing	Aprilia	Qualified in Q2	1:31.060	5	2
6	21	(Italy) Franco Morbidelli	Pertamina Enduro VR46 Racing Team	Ducati	Qualified in Q2	1:31.170	6	2
7	54	(Spain) Fermín Aldeguer	BK8 Gresini Racing MotoGP	Ducati	1:31.557	1:31.286	7	3
8	49	(Italy) Fabio Di Giannantonio	Pertamina Enduro VR46 Racing Team	Ducati	Qualified in Q2	1:31.329	8	3
9	37	(Spain) Pedro Acosta	Red Bull KTM Factory Racing	KTM	Qualified in Q2	1:31.354	9	3
10	12	(Spain) Maverick Viñales	Red Bull KTM Tech3	KTM	Qualified in Q2	1:31.465	10	4
11	25	(Spain) Raúl Fernández	Trackhouse MotoGP Team	Aprilia	1:31.517	1:31.518	11	4
12	5	(France) Johann Zarco	Castrol Honda LCR	Honda	Qualified in Q2	1:31.647	12	4
13	36	(Spain) Joan Mir	Honda HRC Castrol	Honda	1:31.561	N/A	13	5
14	43	(Australia) Jack Miller	Prima Pramac Yamaha MotoGP	Yamaha	1:31.704	N/A	14	5
15	32	(Italy) Lorenzo Savadori	Aprilia Racing	Aprilia	1:31.892	N/A	15	5
16	33	(South Africa) Brad Binder	Red Bull KTM Factory Racing	KTM	1:31.929	N/A	16	6
17	23	(Italy) Enea Bastianini	Red Bull KTM Tech3	KTM	1:31.953	N/A	20	7
18	88	(Portugal) Miguel Oliveira	Prima Pramac Yamaha MotoGP	Yamaha	1:31.972	N/A	17	6
19	42	(Spain) Álex Rins	Monster Energy Yamaha MotoGP Team	Yamaha	1:32.033	N/A	18	6
20	79	(Japan) Ai Ogura	Trackhouse MotoGP Team	Aprilia	1:32.080	N/A	19	7
21	41	(Spain) Aleix Espargaró	Honda HRC Castrol	Honda	1:32.547	N/A	21	7
22	35	(Thailand) Somkiat Chantra	IDEMITSU Honda LCR	Honda	1:33.408	N/A	22	8
OFFICIAL MOTOGP QUALIFYING TIMES REPORT

=== Moto2 ===
Fastest session lap

Pos.	No.	Biker	Team	Constructor	Qualifying times		Final grid	Row
Pos.	No.	Biker	Team	Constructor	P1	P2	Final grid	Row
1	10	(Brazil) Diogo Moreira	Italtrans Racing Team	Kalex	Qualified in Q2	1:34.777	1	1
2	4	(Spain) Iván Ortolá	QJMotor – Frinsa – MSi	Boscoscuro	Qualified in Q2	1:34.849	2	1
3	18	(Spain) Manuel González	Liqui Moly Dynavolt Intact GP	Kalex	Qualified in Q2	1:34.985	3	1
4	44	(Spain) Arón Canet	Fantic Racing Lino Sonego	Kalex	Qualified in Q2	1:35.000	4	2
5	75	(Spain) Albert Arenas	Italjet Gresini Moto2	Kalex	Qualified in Q2	1:35.053	5	2
6	7	(Belgium) Barry Baltus	Fantic Racing Lino Sonego	Kalex	1:35.317	1:35.148	6	2
7	81	(Australia) Senna Agius	Liqui Moly Dynavolt Intact GP	Kalex	Qualified in Q2	1:35.183	7	3
8	16	(United States) Joe Roberts	OnlyFans American Racing Team	Kalex	Qualified in Q2	1:35.255	8	3
9	27	(Spain) Daniel Holgado	CFMoto Inde Aspar Team	Kalex	1:35.247	1:35.277	9	3
10	53	(Turkey) Deniz Öncü	Red Bull KTM Ajo	Kalex	1:35.680	1:35.367	10	4
11	96	(United Kingdom) Jake Dixon	Elf Marc VDS Racing Team	Boscoscuro	Qualified in Q2	1:35.372	11	4
12	84	(Netherlands) Zonta van den Goorbergh	RW-Idrofoglia Racing GP	Kalex	1:35.454	1:35.429	12	4
13	24	(Spain) Marcos Ramírez	OnlyFans American Racing Team	Kalex	Qualified in Q2	1:35.487	13	5
14	12	(Czech Republic) Filip Salač	Elf Marc VDS Racing Team	Boscoscuro	Qualified in Q2	1:35.526	14	5
15	14	(Italy) Tony Arbolino	Blu Cru Pramac Yamaha Moto2	Boscoscuro	Qualified in Q2	1:35.555	15	5
16	13	(Italy) Celestino Vietti	Folladore SpeedRS Team	Boscoscuro	Qualified in Q2	1:35.884	16	6
17	21	(Spain) Alonso López	Folladore SpeedRS Team	Boscoscuro	Qualified in Q2	1:35.997	17	6
18	28	(Spain) Izan Guevara	Blu Cru Pramac Yamaha Moto2	Boscoscuro	Qualified in Q2	1:36.132	18	6
19	71	(Japan) Ayumu Sasaki	RW-Idrofoglia Racing GP	Kalex	1:35.726	N/A	19	7
20	9	(Spain) Jorge Navarro	Klint Forward Factory Team	Forward	1:35.759	N/A	20	7
21	80	(Colombia) David Alonso	CFMoto Inde Aspar Team	Kalex	1:35.956	N/A	21	7
22	95	(Netherlands) Collin Veijer	Red Bull KTM Ajo	Kalex	1:36.133	N/A	22	8
23	99	(Spain) Adrián Huertas	Italtrans Racing Team	Kalex	1:36.246	N/A	23	8
24	11	(Spain) Alex Escrig	Klint Forward Factory Team	Forward	1:36.334	N/A	24	8
25	92	(Japan) Yuki Kunii	Idemitsu Honda Team Asia	Kalex	1:36.480	N/A	25	9
26	15	(South Africa) Darryn Binder	Italjet Gresini Moto2	Kalex	1:36.522	N/A	26	9
27	61	(Spain) Eric Fernández	QJMotor – Frinsa – MSi	Boscoscuro	1:36.606	N/A	27	9
28	41	(Thailand) Nakarin Atiratphuvapat	Idemitsu Honda Team Asia	Kalex	1:36.785	N/A	28	10
OFFICIAL MOTO2 QUALIFYING TIMES REPORT

=== Moto3 ===
Fastest session lap

Pos.	No.	Biker	Team	Constructor	Qualifying times		Final grid	Row
Pos.	No.	Biker	Team	Constructor	P1	P2	Final grid	Row
1	99	(Spain) José Antonio Rueda	Red Bull KTM Ajo	KTM	Qualified in Q2	1:39.757	1	1
2	83	(Spain) Álvaro Carpe	Red Bull KTM Ajo	KTM	1:40.911	1:39.798	2	1
3	22	(Spain) David Almansa	Leopard Racing	Honda	Qualified in Q2	1:39.823	3	1
4	72	(Japan) Taiyo Furusato	Honda Team Asia	Honda	1:40.882	1:39.954	4	2
5	6	(Japan) Ryusei Yamanaka	Frinsa – MT Helmets – MSI	KTM	1:40.833	1:40.093	5	2
6	28	(Spain) Máximo Quiles	CFMoto Gaviota Aspar Team	KTM	1:40.808	1:40.154	6	2
7	94	(Italy) Guido Pini	Liqui Moly Dynavolt Intact GP	KTM	Qualified in Q2	1:40.221	7	3
8	66	(Australia) Joel Kelso	LEVELUP-MTA	KTM	Qualified in Q2	1:40.252	8	3
9	71	(Italy) Dennis Foggia	CFMoto Gaviota Aspar Team	KTM	Qualified in Q2	1:40.343	9	3
10	73	(Argentina) Valentín Perrone	Red Bull KTM Tech3	KTM	Qualified in Q2	1:40.416	10	4
11	10	(Italy) Nicola Carraro	Rivacold Snipers Team	Honda	Qualified in Q2	1:40.437	11	4
12	54	(Italy) Riccardo Rossi	Rivacold Snipers Team	Honda	Qualified in Q2	1:40.473	12	4
13	31	(Spain) Adrián Fernández	Leopard Racing	Honda	Qualified in Q2	1:40.474	13	5
14	64	(Spain) David Muñoz	Liqui Moly Dynavolt Intact GP	KTM	Qualified in Q2	1:40.491	14	5
15	19	(United Kingdom) Scott Ogden	CIP Green Power	KTM	Qualified in Q2	1:40.519	15	5
16	36	(Spain) Ángel Piqueras	Frinsa – MT Helmets – MSI	KTM	Qualified in Q2	1:40.551	16	6
17	12	(Australia) Jacob Roulstone	Red Bull KTM Tech3	KTM	Qualified in Q2	1:40.728	17	6
18	58	(Italy) Luca Lunetta	Sic58 Squadra Corse	Honda	Qualified in Q2	1:40.936	18	6
19	82	(Italy) Stefano Nepa	Sic58 Squadra Corse	Honda	1:41.432	N/A	19	7
20	5	(Thailand) Tatchakorn Buasri	Honda Team Asia	Honda	1:41.761	N/A	20	7
21	30	(Spain) Marcos Uriarte	GRYD - Mlav Racing	KTM	1:41.849	N/A	21	7
22	14	(New Zealand) Cormac Buchanan	Denssi Racing – BOE	KTM	1:41.903	N/A	22	8
23	55	(Switzerland) Noah Dettwiler	CIP Green Power	KTM	1:41.987	N/A	23	8
24	25	(Italy) Leonardo Abruzzo	GRYD - Mlav Racing	Honda	1:42.588	N/A	24	8
25	8	(United Kingdom) Eddie O'Shea	GRYD - Mlav Racing	Honda	1:42.642	N/A	25	9
26	34	(Austria) Jakob Rosenthaler	Denssi Racing – BOE	KTM	1:43.137	N/A	26	9
OFFICIAL MOTO3 QUALIFYING TIMES REPORT

=== MotoE ===
Fastest session lap

Pos.	No.	Biker	Team	Constructor	Qualifying times		Final grid	Row
Pos.	No.	Biker	Team	Constructor	P1	P2	Final grid	Row
1	40	(Italy) Mattia Casadei	LCR E-Team	Ducati	Qualified in Q2	1:39.943	1	1
2	9	(Italy) Andrea Mantovani	KLINT Forward Factory Team	Ducati	1:40.524	1:40.012	2	1
3	81	(Spain) Jordi Torres	Power Electronics Aspar Team	Ducati	Qualified in Q2	1:40.101	3	1
4	29	(Italy) Nicholas Spinelli	Rivacold Snipers Team MotoE	Ducati	Qualified in Q2	1:40.117	4	2
5	11	(Italy) Matteo Ferrari	Felo Gresini MotoE	Ducati	Qualified in Q2	1:40.132	5	2
6	61	(Italy) Alessandro Zaccone	Aruba Cloud MotoE Team	Ducati	Qualified in Q2	1:40.155	6	2
7	51	(Brazil) Eric Granado	LCR E-Team	Ducati	Qualified in Q2	1:40.228	7	3
8	7	(Italy) Lorenzo Baldassarri	Dynavolt Intact GP	Ducati	Qualified in Q2	1:40.501	8	3
9	21	(Italy) Kevin Zannoni	Power Electronics Aspar Team	Ducati	1:40.521	1:40.611	9	3
10	1	(Spain) Héctor Garzó	Dynavolt Intact GP	Ducati	Qualified in Q2	1:41.399	10	4
11	12	(Romania) Jacopo Hosciuc	MSI Racing Team	Ducati	1:40.651	N/A	11	4
12	72	(Italy) Alessio Finello	Felo Gresini MotoE	Ducati	1:40.842	N/A	12	4
13	19	(San Marino) Luca Bernardi	Aruba Cloud MotoE Team	Ducati	1:41.833	N/A	13	5
14	6	(Spain) María Herrera	KLINT Forward Factory Team	Ducati	1:42.260	N/A	14	5
15	47	(Hungary) Tibor Erik Varga	Rivacold Snipers Team MotoE	Ducati	1:42.505	N/A	15	5
16	35	(Spain) Diego Pérez	MSI Racing Team	Ducati	1:42.942	N/A	16	6
17	77	(Italy) Raffaele Fusco	Ongetta Sic58 Squadra Corse	Ducati	1:43.722	N/A	17	6
18	28	(Italy) Tommaso Occhi	Ongetta Sic58 Squadra Corse	Ducati	1:43.927	N/A	18	6
OFFICIAL MOTOE QUALIFICATION RESULTS REPORT

== MotoGP Sprint ==
The MotoGP Sprint was held on 28 June 2025.

Pos.	No.	Rider	Team	Manufacturer	Laps	Time/Retired	Grid	Points
1	93	(Spain) Marc Márquez	Ducati Lenovo Team	Ducati	13	20:02.150	4	12
2	73	(Spain) Álex Márquez	BK8 Gresini Racing MotoGP	Ducati	13	+0.351	3	9
3	72	(Italy) Marco Bezzecchi	Aprilia Racing	Aprilia	13	+1.247	5	7
4	49	(Italy) Fabio Di Giannantonio	Pertamina Enduro VR46 Racing Team	Ducati	13	+2.269	8	6
5	63	(Italy) Francesco Bagnaia	Ducati Lenovo Team	Ducati	13	+2.686	2	5
6	12	(Spain) Maverick Viñales	Red Bull KTM Tech3	KTM	13	+4.074	10	4
7	54	(Spain) Fermín Aldeguer	BK8 Gresini Racing MotoGP	Ducati	13	+9.064	7	3
8	21	(Italy) Franco Morbidelli	Pertamina Enduro VR46 Racing Team	Ducati	13	+9.159	6	2
9	37	(Spain) Pedro Acosta	Red Bull KTM Factory Racing	KTM	13	+11.069 (Note: 3 seconds penalty - insufficient time to complete long lap penalty)	9	1
10	33	(South Africa) Brad Binder	Red Bull KTM Factory Racing	KTM	13	+11.143	16	
11	5	(France) Johann Zarco	Castrol Honda LCR	Honda	13	+11.327	12	
12	88	(Portugal) Miguel Oliveira	Prima Pramac Yamaha MotoGP	Yamaha	13	+12.147	18	
13	23	(Italy) Enea Bastianini	Red Bull KTM Tech3	KTM	13	+15.290	17	
14	43	(Australia) Jack Miller	Prima Pramac Yamaha MotoGP	Yamaha	13	+15.899	14	
15	42	(Spain) Álex Rins	Monster Energy Yamaha MotoGP Team	Yamaha	13	+15.990	19	
16	79	(Japan) Ai Ogura	Trackhouse MotoGP Team	Aprilia	13	+17.554	20	
17	32	(Italy) Lorenzo Savadori	Aprilia Racing	Aprilia	13	+24.707 (Note: 8 second time penalty - low tyre pressure)	15	
18	41	(Spain) Aleix Espargaró	Honda HRC Castrol	Honda	13	+27.287	21	
19	35	(Thailand) Somkiat Chantra	IDEMITSU Honda LCR	Honda	13	+32.441	22	
Ret	20	(France) Fabio Quartararo	Monster Energy Yamaha MotoGP Team	Yamaha	9	Accident	1	
Ret	25	(Spain) Raúl Fernández	Trackhouse MotoGP Team	Aprilia	1	Accident damage	11	
Ret	36	(Spain) Joan Mir	Honda HRC Castrol	Honda	0	Accident	13	
Fastest sprint lap: (Italy) Fabio Di Giannantonio (Ducati) – 1:31.723 (lap 4)
OFFICIAL MOTOGP SPRINT REPORT

== Warm Up ==
=== MotoGP ===
Pos.	No.	Biker	Team	Constructor	
Pos.	No.	Biker	Team	Constructor	Time results
1	73	(Spain) Álex Márquez	BK8 Gresini Racing MotoGP	Ducati	1:31.874
2	93	(Spain) Marc Márquez	Ducati Lenovo Team	Ducati	1:32.011
3	72	(Italy) Marco Bezzecchi	Aprilia Racing	Aprilia	1:32.015
4	63	(Italy) Francesco Bagnaia	Ducati Lenovo Team	Ducati	1:32.071
5	20	(France) Fabio Quartararo	Monster Energy Yamaha MotoGP Team	Yamaha	1:32.110
6	37	(Spain) Pedro Acosta	Red Bull KTM Factory Racing	KTM	1:32.374
7	43	(Australia) Jack Miller	Prima Pramac Yamaha MotoGP	Yamaha	1:32.400
8	54	(Spain) Fermín Aldeguer	BK8 Gresini Racing MotoGP	Ducati	1:32.466
9	12	(Spain) Maverick Viñales	Red Bull KTM Tech3	KTM	1:32.470
10	88	(Portugal) Miguel Oliveira	Prima Pramac Yamaha MotoGP	Yamaha	1:32.480
11	21	(Italy) Franco Morbidelli	Pertamina Enduro VR46 Racing Team	Ducati	1:32.498
12	49	(Italy) Fabio Di Giannantonio	Pertamina Enduro VR46 Racing Team	Ducati	1:32.593
13	23	(Italy) Enea Bastianini	Red Bull KTM Tech3	KTM	1:32.606
14	36	(Spain) Joan Mir	Honda HRC Castrol	Honda	1:32.751
15	25	(Spain) Raúl Fernández	Trackhouse MotoGP Team	Aprilia	1:32.872
16	5	(France) Johann Zarco	CASTROL Honda LCR	Honda	1:32.896
17	42	(Spain) Álex Rins	Monster Energy Yamaha MotoGP Team	Yamaha	1:32.909
18	79	(Japan) Ai Ogura	Trackhouse MotoGP Team	Aprilia	1:32.948
19	41	(Spain) Aleix Espargaró	Honda HRC Castrol	Honda	1:33.064
20	33	(South Africa) Brad Binder	Red Bull KTM Factory Racing	KTM	1:33.070
21	32	(Italy) Lorenzo Savadori	Aprilia Racing	Aprilia	1:33.566
22	35	(Thailand) Somkiat Chantra	Idemitsu Honda LCR	Honda	1:34.144
OFFICIAL MOTOGP WARM UP TIMES REPORT

== Race ==
=== MotoGP ===
Pos.	No.	Rider	Team	Manufacturer	Laps	Time/Retired	Grid	Points
1	93	(Spain) Marc Márquez	Ducati Lenovo Team	Ducati	26	40:14.072	4	25
2	72	(Italy) Marco Bezzecchi	Aprilia Racing	Aprilia	26	+0.635	5	20
3	63	(Italy) Francesco Bagnaia	Ducati Lenovo Team	Ducati	26	+2.666	2	16
4	37	(Spain) Pedro Acosta	Red Bull KTM Factory Racing	KTM	26	+6.084	9	13
5	12	(Spain) Maverick Viñales	Red Bull KTM Tech3	KTM	26	+10.124	10	11
6	49	(Italy) Fabio Di Giannantonio	Pertamina Enduro VR46 Racing Team	Ducati	26	+12.163	8	10
7	21	(Italy) Franco Morbidelli	Pertamina Enduro VR46 Racing Team	Ducati	26	+18.896	6	9
8	25	(Spain) Raúl Fernández	Trackhouse MotoGP Team	Aprilia	26	+20.295	11	8
9	23	(Italy) Enea Bastianini	Red Bull KTM Tech3	KTM	26	+23.687	20	7
10	20	(France) Fabio Quartararo	Monster Energy Yamaha MotoGP Team	Yamaha	26	+23.743	1	6
11	33	(South Africa) Brad Binder	Red Bull KTM Factory Racing	KTM	26	+24.251	16	5
12	5	(France) Johann Zarco	CASTROL Honda LCR	Honda	26	+24.875	12	4
13	42	(Spain) Álex Rins	Monster Energy Yamaha MotoGP Team	Yamaha	26	+24.882	18	3
14	43	(Australia) Jack Miller	Prima Pramac Yamaha MotoGP	Yamaha	26	+25.065	14	2
15	35	(Thailand) Somkiat Chantra	IDEMITSU Honda LCR	Honda	26	+49.219	22	1
16	41	(Spain) Aleix Espargaró	Honda HRC Castrol	Honda	26	+49.360	21	
Ret	88	(Portugal) Miguel Oliveira	Prima Pramac Yamaha MotoGP	Yamaha	8	Accident damage	17	
Ret	73	(Spain) Álex Márquez	BK8 Gresini Racing MotoGP	Ducati	5	Accident	3	
Ret	54	(Spain) Fermín Aldeguer	BK8 Gresini Racing MotoGP	Ducati	5	Accident	7	
Ret	36	(Spain) Joan Mir	Honda HRC Castrol	Honda	5	Accident	13	
Ret	32	(Italy) Lorenzo Savadori	Aprilia Racing	Aprilia	3	Accident	15	
Ret	79	(Japan) Ai Ogura	Trackhouse MotoGP Team	Aprilia	0	Accident	19	
Fastest lap: (Italy) Francesco Bagnaia (Ducati) - 1:32.220 (lap 16)
OFFICIAL MOTOGP RACE REPORT

=== Moto2 ===
Pos.	No.	Rider	Team	Manufacturer	Laps	Time/Retired	Grid	Points
1	10	(Brazil) Diogo Moreira	Italtrans Racing Team	Kalex	22	35:24.852	1	25
2	44	(Spain) Arón Canet	Fantic Racing Lino Sonego	Kalex	22	+0.056	4	20
3	18	(Spain) Manuel González	Liqui Moly Dynavolt Intact GP	Kalex	22	+1.783	3	16
4	96	(United Kingdom) Jake Dixon	Elf Marc VDS Racing Team	Boscoscuro	22	+2.364	11	13
5	16	(United States) Joe Roberts	OnlyFans American Racing Team	Kalex	22	+3.212	8	11
6	24	(Spain) Marcos Ramírez	OnlyFans American Racing Team	Kalex	22	+3.273	13	10
7	75	(Spain) Albert Arenas	Italjet Gresini Moto2	Kalex	22	+10.224	5	9
8	21	(Spain) Alonso López	Folladore SpeedRS Team	Boscoscuro	22	+10.383	17	8
9	81	(Australia) Senna Agius	Liqui Moly Dynavolt Intact GP	Kalex	22	+11.324	7	7
10	27	(Spain) Daniel Holgado	CFMoto Inde Aspar Team	Kalex	22	+11.720	9	6
11	13	(Italy) Celestino Vietti	Folladore SpeedRS Team	Boscoscuro	22	+11.761	16	5
12	84	(Netherlands) Zonta van den Goorbergh	RW-Idrofoglia Racing GP	Kalex	22	+13.635	12	4
13	14	(Italy) Tony Arbolino	Blu Cru Pramac Yamaha Moto2	Boscoscuro	22	+19.452	15	3
14	95	(Netherlands) Collin Veijer	Red Bull KTM Ajo	Kalex	22	+23.656	22	2
15	71	(Japan) Ayumu Sasaki	RW-Idrofoglia Racing GP	Kalex	22	+23.837	19	1
16	11	(Spain) Alex Escrig	Klint Forward Factory Team	Forward	22	+32.850	24	
17	61	(Spain) Eric Fernández	QJMotor – Frinsa – MSi	Boscoscuro	22	+57.934	27	
Ret	4	(Spain) Iván Ortolá	QJMotor – Frinsa – MSi	Boscoscuro	21	Accident	2	
Ret	53	(Turkey) Deniz Öncü	Red Bull KTM Ajo	Kalex	13	Accident	10	
Ret	92	(Japan) Yuki Kunii	Idemitsu Honda Team Asia	Kalex	13	Accident	25	
Ret	99	(Spain) Adrián Huertas	Italtrans Racing Team	Kalex	10	Accident	23	
Ret	15	(South Africa) Darryn Binder	Italjet Gresini Moto2	Kalex	10	Accident	26	
Ret	12	(Czech Republic) Filip Salač	Elf Marc VDS Racing Team	Boscoscuro	7	Injury	14	
Ret	7	(Belgium) Barry Baltus	Fantic Racing Lino Sonego	Kalex	6	Accident	6	
Ret	9	(Spain) Jorge Navarro	Klint Forward Factory Team	Forward	6	Accident	20	
Ret	41	(Thailand) Nakarin Atiratphuvapat	Idemitsu Honda Team Asia	Kalex	4	Accident	28	
Ret	80	(Colombia) David Alonso	CFMoto European Privilege Aspar Team	Kalex	2	Accident	21	
Ret	28	(Spain) Izan Guevara	Blu Cru Pramac Yamaha Moto2	Boscoscuro	1	Accident	18	
Fastest lap: (Brazil) Diogo Moreira (Kalex) - 1:35.580 (lap 3)
OFFICIAL MOTO2 RACE REPORT

=== Moto3 ===
Pos.	No.	Rider	Team	Manufacturer	Laps	Time/Retired	Grid	Points
1	99	(Spain) José Antonio Rueda	Red Bull KTM Ajo	KTM	19	32:12.319	1	25
2	64	(Spain) David Muñoz	Liqui Moly Dynavolt Intact GP	KTM	19	+0.144	14	20
3	73	(Argentina) Valentín Perrone	Red Bull KTM Tech3	KTM	19	+0.245	10	16
4	83	(Spain) Álvaro Carpe	Red Bull KTM Ajo	KTM	19	+1..087	2	13
5	36	(Spain) Ángel Piqueras	Frinsa – MT Helmets – MSI	KTM	19	+1.296	16	11
6	22	(Spain) David Almansa	Leopard Racing	Honda	19	+2.083	3	10
7	19	(United Kingdom) Scott Ogden	CIP Green Power	KTM	19	+2.234	15	9
8	71	(Italy) Dennis Foggia	CFMoto Valresa Aspar Team	KTM	19	+5.034	9	8
9	66	(Australia) Joel Kelso	LEVELUP-MTA	KTM	19	+5.755	8	7
10	89	(Spain) Marcos Uriarte	LEVELUP-MTA	KTM	19	+6.318	21	6
11	6	(Japan) Ryusei Yamanaka	Frinsa – MT Helmets – MSI	KTM	19	+7.002	5	5
12	12	(Australia) Jacob Roulstone	Red Bull KTM Tech3	KTM	19	+8.555	17	4
13	82	(Italy) Stefano Nepa	Sic58 Squadra Corse	Honda	19	+12.395	19	3
14	54	(Italy) Riccardo Rossi	Rivacold Snipers Team	Honda	19	+12.675	12	2
15	28	(Spain) Máximo Quiles	CFMoto Gaviota Aspar Team	KTM	19	+24.394	6	1
16	55	(Switzerland) Noah Dettwiler	CIP Green Power	KTM	19	+25.294	23	
17	34	(Austria) Jakob Rosenthaler	Denssi Racing – BOE	KTM	19	+31.492	26	
Ret	72	(Japan) Taiyo Furusato	Honda Team Asia	Honda	18	Accident	4	
Ret	58	(Italy) Luca Lunetta	Sic58 Squadra Corse	Honda	18	Accident	18	
Ret	31	(Spain) Adrián Fernández	Leopard Racing	Honda	18	Accident	13	
Ret	8	(United Kingdom) Eddie O'Shea	GRYD - Mlav Racing	Honda	15	Accident	25	
Ret	5	(Thailand) Tatchakorn Buasri	Honda Team Asia	Honda	15	Accident	20	
Ret	14	(New Zealand) Cormac Buchanan	Denssi Racing – BOE	KTM	12	Accident	22	
Ret	10	(Italy) Nicola Carraro	Rivacold Snipers Team	Honda	12	Accident	11	
Ret	25	(Italy) Leonardo Abruzzo	GRYD - Mlav Racing	Honda	6	Accident	24	
DNS	94	(Italy) Guido Pini	Liqui Moly Dynavolt Intact GP	KTM	0	Technical	7	
Fastest lap: (Australia) Joel Kelso (KTM) - 1:40.395 (lap 12)
OFFICIAL MOTO3 RACE REPORT

=== MotoE ===
==== Race 1 ====
Pos.	No.	Rider	Team	Manufacturer	Laps	Time/Retired	Grid	Points
1	9	(Italy) Andrea Mantovani	KLINT Forward Factory Team	Ducati	7	11:44.435	2	25
2	61	(Italy) Alessandro Zaccone	Aruba Cloud MotoE Team	Ducati	7	+0.413	6	20
3	81	(Spain) Jordi Torres	Power Electronics Aspar Team	Ducati	7	+0.858	3	16
4	29	(Italy) Nicholas Spinelli	Rivacold Snipers Team MotoE	Ducati	7	+1.052	4	13
5	11	(Italy) Matteo Ferrari	Felo Gresini MotoE	Ducati	7	+3.289	5	11
6	7	(Italy) Lorenzo Baldassarri	Dynavolt Intact GP	Ducati	7	+3.657	8	10
7	51	(Brazil) Eric Granado	LCR E-Team	Ducati	7	+4.316	7	9
8	21	(Italy) Kevin Zannoni	Power Electronics Aspar Team	Ducati	7	+4.924	9	8
9	1	(Spain) Héctor Garzó	Dynavolt Intact GP	Ducati	7	+9.238	10	7
10	12	(Romania) Jacopo Hosciuc	MSI Racing Team	Ducati	7	+9.392	11	6
11	47	(Hungary) Tibor Erik Varga	Rivacold Snipers Team MotoE	Ducati	7	+12.665	15	5
12	35	(Spain) Diego Pérez	MSI Racing Team	Ducati	7	+23.574	16	4
13	77	(Italy) Raffaele Fusco	Ongetta Sic58 Squadra Corse	Ducati	7	+26.593	17	3
14	28	(Italy) Tommaso Occhi	Ongetta Sic58 Squadra Corse	Ducati	7	+36.281	18	2
15	6	(Spain) María Herrera	KLINT Forward Factory Team	Ducati	7	+42.123 (Note: 25 second time penalty - failed to comply with double long lap penalty)	14	1
16	40	(Italy) Mattia Casadei	LCR E-Team	Ducati	7	+1:44.617	1	
Ret	72	(Italy) Alessio Finello	Felo Gresini MotoE	Ducati	5	Accident	12	
Ret	19	(San Marino) Luca Bernardi	Aruba Cloud MotoE Team	Ducati	5	Accident	13	
Fastest lap: (Italy) Andrea Mantovani (Ducati) - 1:39.723 (lap 5)
OFFICIAL MOTOE RACE REPORT

==== Race 2 ====
Pos.	No.	Rider	Team	Manufacturer	Laps	Time/Retired	Grid	Points
1	61	(Italy) Alessandro Zaccone	Aruba Cloud MotoE Team	Ducati	7	11:44.438	6	25
2	9	(Italy) Andrea Mantovani	KLINT Forward Factory Team	Ducati	7	+0.365	2	20
3	7	(Italy) Lorenzo Baldassarri	Dynavolt Intact GP	Ducati	7	+3.244	8	16
4	81	(Spain) Jordi Torres	Power Electronics Aspar Team	Ducati	7	+3.463	3	13
5	1	(Spain) Héctor Garzó	Dynavolt Intact GP	Ducati	7	+3.721	10	11
6	40	(Italy) Mattia Casadei	LCR E-Team	Ducati	7	+3.874	1	10
7	51	(Brazil) Eric Granado	LCR E-Team	Ducati	7	+4.321	7	9
8	29	(Italy) Nicholas Spinelli	Rivacold Snipers Team MotoE	Ducati	7	+5.151	4	8
9	12	(Romania) Jacopo Hosciuc	MSI Racing Team	Ducati	7	+7.124	11	7
10	72	(Italy) Alessio Finello	Felo Gresini MotoE	Ducati	7	+9.112	12	6
11	21	(Italy) Kevin Zannoni	Power Electronics Aspar Team	Ducati	7	+9.176	9	5
12	11	(Italy) Matteo Ferrari	Felo Gresini MotoE	Ducati	7	+9.379 (Note: 3 second penalty - shortcut at T17)	5	4
13	19	(San Marino) Luca Bernardi	Aruba Cloud MotoE Team	Ducati	7	+10.555	13	3
14	47	(Hungary) Tibor Erik Varga	Rivacold Snipers Team MotoE	Ducati	7	+12.925	15	2
15	6	(Spain) María Herrera	KLINT Forward Factory Team	Ducati	7	+13.017	14	1
16	35	(Spain) Diego Pérez	MSI Racing Team	Ducati	7	+18.089	16	
17	77	(Italy) Raffaele Fusco	Ongetta Sic58 Squadra Corse	Ducati	7	+31.585	17	
Ret	28	(Italy) Tommaso Occhi	Ongetta Sic58 Squadra Corse	Ducati	5	Accident	18	
Fastest lap: (Italy) Alessandro Zaccone (Ducati) - 1:39.592 (lap 4)
OFFICIAL MOTOE RACE 2 REPORT

== Championship standings after the race ==
Below are the standings for the top five riders, constructors, and teams after the round.

=== MotoGP ===
Riders' Championship standings

Pos.	Rider	Points
1	(Spain) Marc Márquez	307
2	(Spain) Álex Márquez	239
3	(Italy) Francesco Bagnaia	181
4	(Italy) Franco Morbidelli	139
5	(Italy) Fabio Di Giannantonio	136

Constructors' Championship standings

	Pos.	Constructor	Points
	1	(Italy) Ducati	356
2	2	(Italy) Aprilia	145
	3	(Austria) KTM	137
2	4	(Japan) Honda	128
	5	(Japan) Yamaha	98

Teams' Championship standings

Pos.	Team	Points
1	(Italy) Ducati Lenovo Team	488
2	(Italy) BK8 Gresini Racing MotoGP	320
3	(Italy) Pertamina Enduro VR46 Racing Team	275
4	(Austria) Red Bull KTM Factory Racing	145
5	(Italy) Aprilia Racing	129

=== Moto2 ===
Riders' Championship standings

	Pos.	Rider	Points
	1	(Spain) Manuel González	159
	2	(Spain) Arón Canet	154
	3	(Brazil) Diogo Moreira	128
1	4	(United Kingdom) Jake Dixon	98
1	5	(Belgium) Barry Baltus	94

Constructors' Championship standings

Pos.	Constructor	Points
1	(Germany) Kalex	233
2	(Italy) Boscoscuro	134
3	(Switzerland) Forward	11

Teams' Championship standings

	Pos.	Team	Points
	1	(Italy) Fantic Racing Lino Sonego	248
	2	(Germany) Liqui Moly Dynavolt Intact GP	246
	3	(Belgium) Elf Marc VDS Racing Team	150
1	4	(Italy) Italtrans Racing Team	133
1	5	(Italy) Folladore SpeedRS Team	126

=== Moto3 ===
Riders' Championship standings

	Pos.	Rider	Points
	1	(Spain) José Antonio Rueda	187
1	2	(Spain) Álvaro Carpe	118
1	3	(Spain) Ángel Piqueras	117
	4	(Australia) Joel Kelso	100
	5	(Spain) Máximo Quiles	86

Constructors' Championship standings

Pos.	Constructor	Points
1	(Austria) KTM	250
2	(Japan) Honda	136

Teams' Championship standings

Pos.	Team	Points
1	(Finland) Red Bull KTM Ajo	305
2	(Spain) Frinsa – MT Helmets – MSi	177
3	(Italy) LevelUp – MTA	153
4	(Spain) CFMoto Gaviota Aspar Team	143
5	(Luxembourg) Leopard Racing	127

=== MotoE ===
Riders' Championship standings

	Pos.	Rider	Points
2	1	(Italy) Andrea Mantovani	74
7	2	(Italy) Alessandro Zaccone	61
2	3	(Spain) Jordi Torres	54
3	4	(Italy) Lorenzo Baldassarri	47
4	5	(Italy) Mattia Casadei	46

Teams' Championship standings

	Pos.	Team	Points
	1	(Spain) Power Electronics Aspar Team	100
	2	(Switzerland) Klint Forward Team	97
3	3	(Italy) Aruba Cloud MotoE Team	74
3	4	(Germany) Dynavolt Intact GP	65
1	5	(Monaco) LCR E-Team	64

== Notes ==
Previous race: 2025 Italian Grand Prix	FIM Grand Prix World Championship; 2025 season	Next race: 2025 German Grand Prix
Previous race: 2024 Dutch TT	Dutch TT	Next race: 2026 Dutch TT
