= Safilo =

Italian eyewear company

Safilo Group S.p.A.
- Type: Public
- Traded as: BIT: SFL
- Industry: Fashion, manufacturing
- Founded: 1934; 92 years ago, in Pieve di Cadore, Italy
- Founder: Guglielmo Tabacchi
- Headquarters: Padua, Italy
- Area served: Worldwide
- Key people: Angelo Trocchia (CEO); Eugenio Razelli (president)
- Products: Sport and fashion sunglasses, spectacle frames, ski helmets and goggles, bike helmets
- Services: Opticians, e-commerce
- Revenue: €983.4 million (2025)
- Net income: €44.6 million (2025)
- Number of employees: 3,400 (2025)
- Website: www.safilogroup.com/en/

Safilo Group S.p.A. (acronym of Società Azionaria Fabbrica Italiana Lavorazione Occhiali) is an Italian company that designs, produces, and distributes prescription frames, sunglasses, sports eyewear, ski goggles and helmets, and cycling helmets under its own five house brands and 32 licensed brands, including Smith Optics since 1996.

Safilo's products are manufactured in its own Italian facilities, with additional plants in China and the United States. In the recent years Safilo sold or closed several of its plants, Martingnacco, Italy in 2020, Ormož, Slovenia in 2021, and Longarone, Italy in 2023. According to the 2023 Annual Report Safilo has wholly owned subsidiaries in 40 countries and more than 50 distribution partners in 70 countries.

Safilo has operated as one of the largest companies in the eyewear industry. The company traditionally trailed Luxottica, later EssilorLuxottica, as the second largest company, though slipped to third when both LVMH and Kering began manufacturing eyewear for its brands rather than having Safilo produce eyewear for their fashion houses; Kering Eyewear subsequently became the second largest in 2022.

== History ==
The first manufacturing site opened in 1878 to produce lenses and frames in Calalzo di Cadore, in the Venetian Alps. Guglielmo Tabacchi bought this production site in 1934 and founded a new eyewear company, Safilo, today the oldest player in the Italian eyewear industry.

In 1974, the founder of Safilo died and his sons took over. In the 1970s, Safilo opened sales offices in various European countries, patented the Elasta hinge, and introduced a popular UFO model of sunglasses.

In the 1980s, Safilo developed designer collections and gained full control of the American eyewear company Starline Optical Corp. It subsequently acquired then sunglass-maker Friuli-based Oxsol and was introduced on the Milan Stock Exchange in 1987. In 1989, Safilo started to produce Gucci's eyewear, and extended to more PPR-owned (today Kering) brands such as Yves Saint Laurent, Bottega Veneta and Alexander McQueen.

In the 1990s, Safilo entered the Asian market, in Hong Kong, opened branches in more countries in Europe, South Africa, Japan and Brazil. Safilo Group acquired the American sports eyewear maker Smith Sports Optics and Austria's Carrera Optyl.

In May 2001, Safilo's chairman Vittorio Tabacchi (grandson of Safilo's founder) launched a takeover bid to acquire full ownership of the Safilo Group. Still in 2001, the company inaugurated its new centralized warehouse at its Padua headquarters. In 2002, Safilo acquired the Solstice Sunglasses chain in US, which was then sold in 2019 to focus exclusively on the wholesale business model. Roberto Vedovotto was CEO of the Safilo Group from 2002 to 2006 and relieved the group's saddling debt by selling 40% to Crédit Suisse First Boston. The company returned to the Milan Stock Exchange in December 2005. That year, the Safilo Group made $1.1 billion in revenue and produced 2,500 new eyewear designs. Roberto Vedovotto returned to lead Safilo as CEO in November 2009.

In January 2019, HAL Holdings N.V., through its subsidiary Multibrands Italy B.V., increased its shares in Safilo to 49.8%. In 2020, the Safilo Group completed the acquisition of Blenders Eyewear and Privé Revaux, two digitally native brands powered by a strong e-commerce business model. The eyewear group also partnered with The Ocean Cleanup to create sunglasses made with ocean waste plastic.

Safilo owns its private collection about the history of eyewear and of the company.

In January 2024, Safilo renewed its partnership with Levi's until 2029.

== Philanthropy and sustainability ==
In 2005, Safilo USA supported relief efforts for victims of Hurricane Katrina by donating eyewear and raising $70,000 for the American Red Cross.

In 2020, Safilo introduced ECONYL regenerated nylon into some of its eyewear products through a partnership with Aquafil. In 2022, the company joined The Fashion Pact, a group of fashion and textile companies engaging in sustainability practices.

== Eyewear brands ==
House brands:

- Carrera
- Polaroid Eyewear
- Smith Optics
- Blenders Eyewear
- Privè Revaux
- Seventh Street

Licensed eyewear brands:

- Banana Republic
- Boss
- Carolina Herrera
- David Beckham
- Victoria Beckham
- Dsquared2
- Fossil
- havaianas
- Hugo
- Isabel Marant
- Jimmy Choo
- Kate Spade
- Levi's
- Liz Claiborne
- Juicy Couture
- Missoni
- Marc Jacobs
- Moschino
- Pierre Cardin
- Ports Eyewear
- Rag & Bone
- Rebecca Minkoff
- Tommy Hilfiger
- Tommy Jeans
- Under Armour

== See also ==
- List of Italian companies
