= Carrera Sunglasses =

Italian eyewear design and production company

Carrera
- Industry: Sunglasses Eyeglasses
- Founded: 1956
- Founder: Wilhelm Anger
- Headquarters: Padua, Italy
- Owner: Safilo Group S.p.A.
- Website: www.carreraworld.com

Carrera is a trademark belonging to Safilo Group S.p.A. that designs and produces sunglasses and sports eyewear. Founded in Austria in 1956, it now operates from Padua, Italy.

== History ==
Carrera was founded in 1956 in Austria by Wilhelm Anger as the sports eyewear maker Wilhelm Anger Werker inspired by the Carrera Panamericana auto race.

In 1964, Wilhelm Anger developed and patented the "Optyl" material, which was a heat-hardened plastic weighing 20% less than acetate resulting in a reduction of allergic reactions and improved fit through a memory effect that provided permanent elasticity and dimensional stability.

In 1974, the company was renamed Carrera International and established a headquarters in Traun, Austria, and went to partner with automobile designer Ferdinand Alexander to develop the sunglass collection Carrera Porsche Design.

In the 1980s, Carrera sponsored sporting events such as the America's Cup, the 1988 Winter Olympics, and Formula 1 racing.

In 1996, Safilo Group S.p.A. purchased Carrera and now have headquarters in Padova, Italy. In the same year, the company established its assembly plant in the province of Henan in China.

Carrera sunglasses have been featured in many movies and television shows, such as Al Pacino in Scarface, Don Johnson in Miami Vice, Robert De Niro in Casino, and James Franco in Spring Breakers. Actors Chris Hemsworth (who plays James Hunt) and Daniel Brühl (who plays Niki Lauda) spend just as much time in Carrera shades in Rush.

A complete collection of Carrera eyewear is collected by Safilo Private Collection.
