= Brooklyn Navy Yard =

Shipyard and industrial complex in Brooklyn, New York

- Brooklyn, New York City, New York
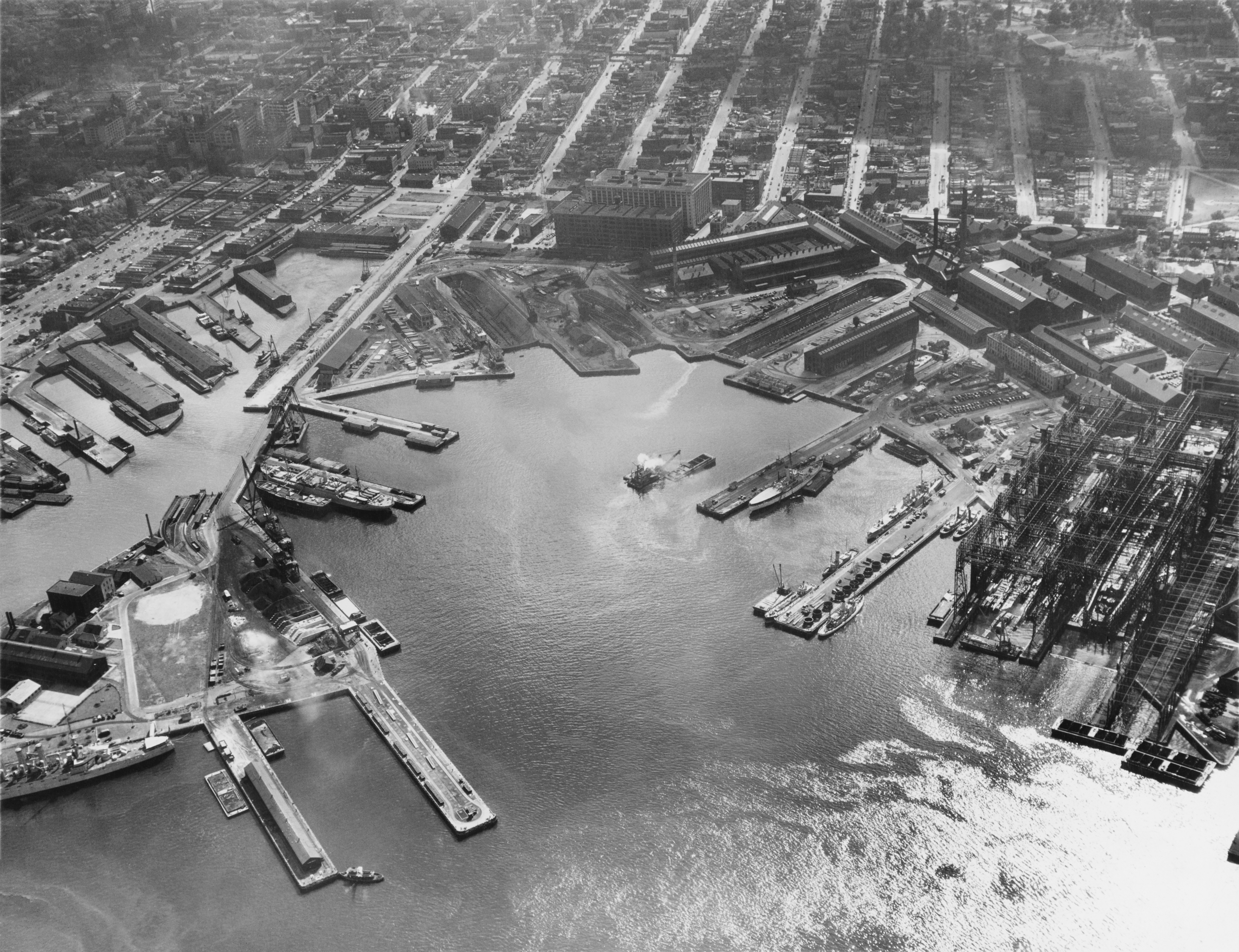
- Aerial photo taken in 1918

Site information
- Type: Shipyard
- Controlled by: United States Navy

Site history
- Built: 1801
- In use: 1806–1966
- Brooklyn Navy Yard Historic District
- U.S. National Register of Historic Places
- U.S. Historic district
- New York State Register of Historic Places
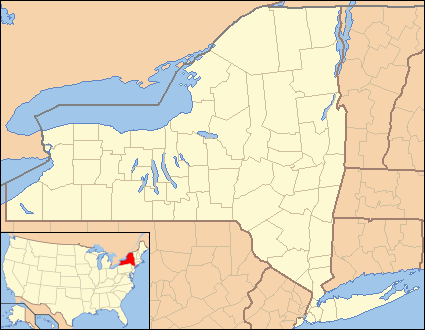
- Location within New York City Location within New York Location within the United States
- Location: Navy Street and Flushing and Kent Avenues; Brooklyn, New York City
- Coordinates: 40°42′07″N 73°58′08″W
- Area: 225.15 acres (91.11 ha)
- Built: 1801
- Architectural style: Early Republic, Mid-19th Century, Late Victorian, Modern Movement
- NRHP reference No.: 14000261

Significant dates
- Added to NRHP: May 22, 2014
- Designated NYSRHP: March 31, 2014

The Brooklyn Navy Yard (originally known as the New York Navy Yard) is a shipyard and industrial complex in northwest Brooklyn in New York City, New York, U.S. The Navy Yard is located on the East River in Wallabout Bay, a semicircular bend of the river across from Corlears Hook in Manhattan. It is bounded by Navy Street to the west, Flushing Avenue to the south, Kent Avenue to the east, and the East River on the north. The site, which covers 225.15 acres (91.11 ha), is listed on the National Register of Historic Places.

The Brooklyn Navy Yard was established in 1801. From the early 1810s through the 1960s, it was an active shipyard for the United States Navy, and was also known as the United States Naval Shipyard, Brooklyn and New York Naval Shipyard at various points in its history. The Brooklyn Navy Yard produced wooden ships for the U.S. Navy through the 1870s. The shipyard transitioned to producing iron vessels after the American Civil War in the mid-1860s. It produced some of the Navy's last pre-dreadnought battleships just prior to World War I, and it performed major repairs and overhauls of its dreadnought and post-dreadnought battleships during World War II.

The Brooklyn Navy Yard has been expanded several times, and at its peak, it covered over 356 acres (144 ha). The efforts of its 75,000 workers during World War II earned the yard the nickname "The Can-Do Shipyard". The Navy Yard was deactivated as a military installation in 1966, but continued to be used by private industries. The facility now houses an industrial and commercial complex run by the New York City government, both related to shipping repairs and maintenance and as office and manufacturing space for non-maritime industries.

The Brooklyn Navy Yard includes dozens of structures, some of which date to the 19th century. The Brooklyn Naval Hospital, a medical complex on the east side of the Brooklyn Navy Yard site, served as the yard's hospital from 1838 until 1948. Dry Dock 1, one of six dry docks at the yard, was completed in 1851 and is listed as a New York City designated landmark. Former structures include Admiral's Row, a grouping of officers' residences at the west end of the yard, which was torn down in 2016 to accommodate new construction. Several new buildings were built in the late 20th and early 21st centuries as part of the city-run commercial and industrial complex. A commandant's residence, also a National Historic Landmark, is located away from the main navy yard site. The FDNY's Marine Operations Division and their fireboats are located at Building 292.

== History ==
=== Site ===
The site of the Brooklyn Navy Yard was originally a mudflat and tidal marsh settled by the Canarsie Indians. The Dutch colonized the area in the early 17th century, and by 1637, Dutch settler Joris Jansen Rapelje purchased 335 acres (136 ha) of land around present-day Wallabout Bay from the Indians. The site later became his farm, though Rapelje himself did not reside on it until circa 1655. Rapelje was a Walloon from Belgium, and the area around his farm came to be known as "Waal-boght" or "Waal-bocht", which translates roughly into "Walloon's Bay"; this is probably where the name of Wallabout Bay was adapted from. The Rapelje family and their descendants had possession of the farm for at least a century afterward, and mostly farmed on the drained mudflats and tidal marshland. They built a grist mill and a mill pond on the site by 1710. The pond continued to be used through the 19th century. The Remsen family were the last descendants of the Rapeljes to own the farm, and they held possession of nearby land plots through the mid-19th century.

During the American Revolutionary War, the British held American prisoners of war on prison ships moored in the bay. Many of the prisoners died and were buried in trenches on nearby ground. Some 12,000 prisoners were said to have died by 1783, when the remaining prisoners were freed. The Prison Ship Martyrs' Monument in nearby Fort Greene was built to honor these casualties. In 1781, shipbuilder John Jackson and two of his brothers acquired different parts of the Rapelje estate. Jackson went on to create the neighborhood of Wallabout, as well as a shipbuilding facility on the site. The first ship that Jackson built at the site was the merchant ship Canton, which he built in the late 1790s.

=== Development and early years ===
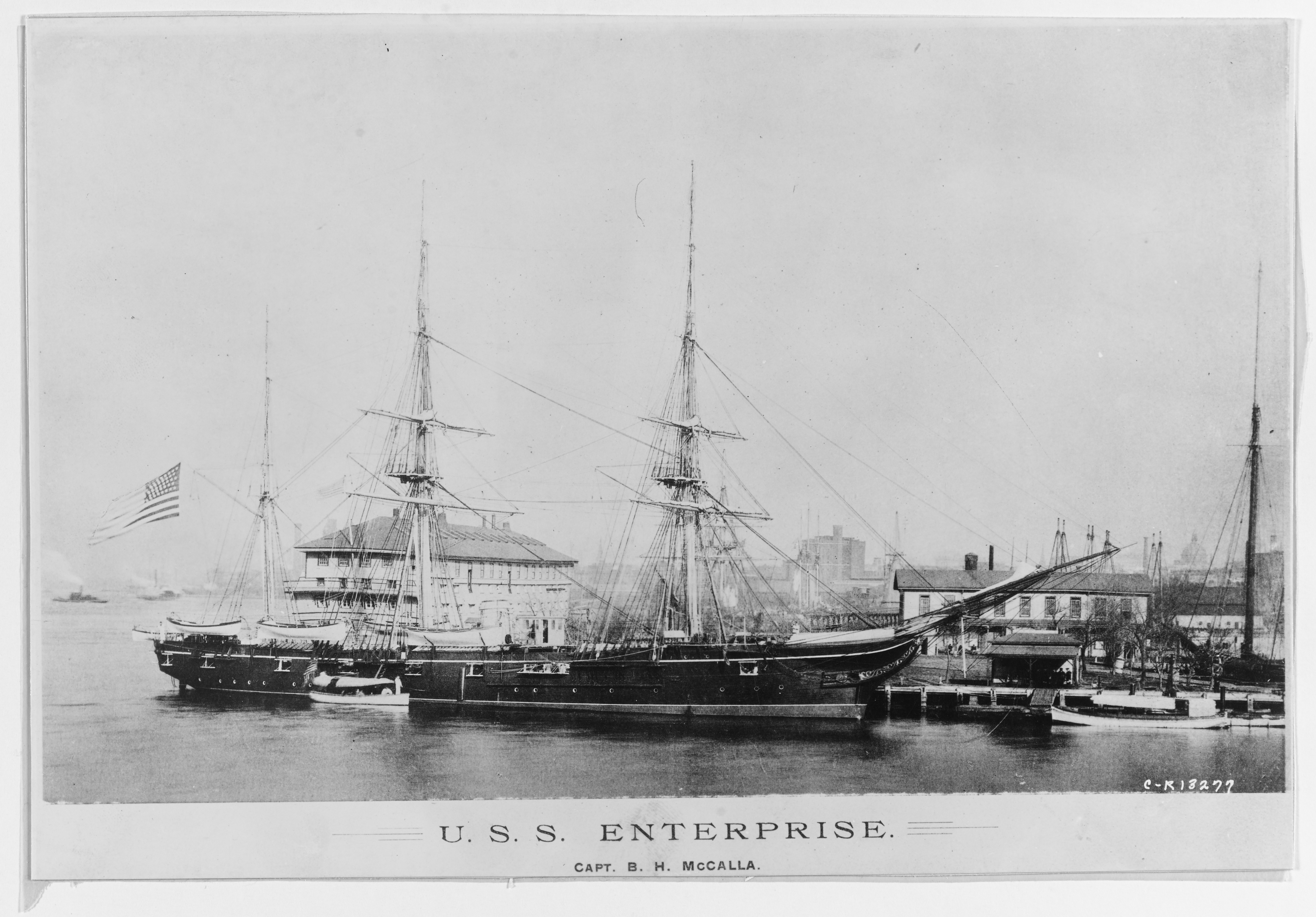
Enterprise docked at the yard, circa 1890

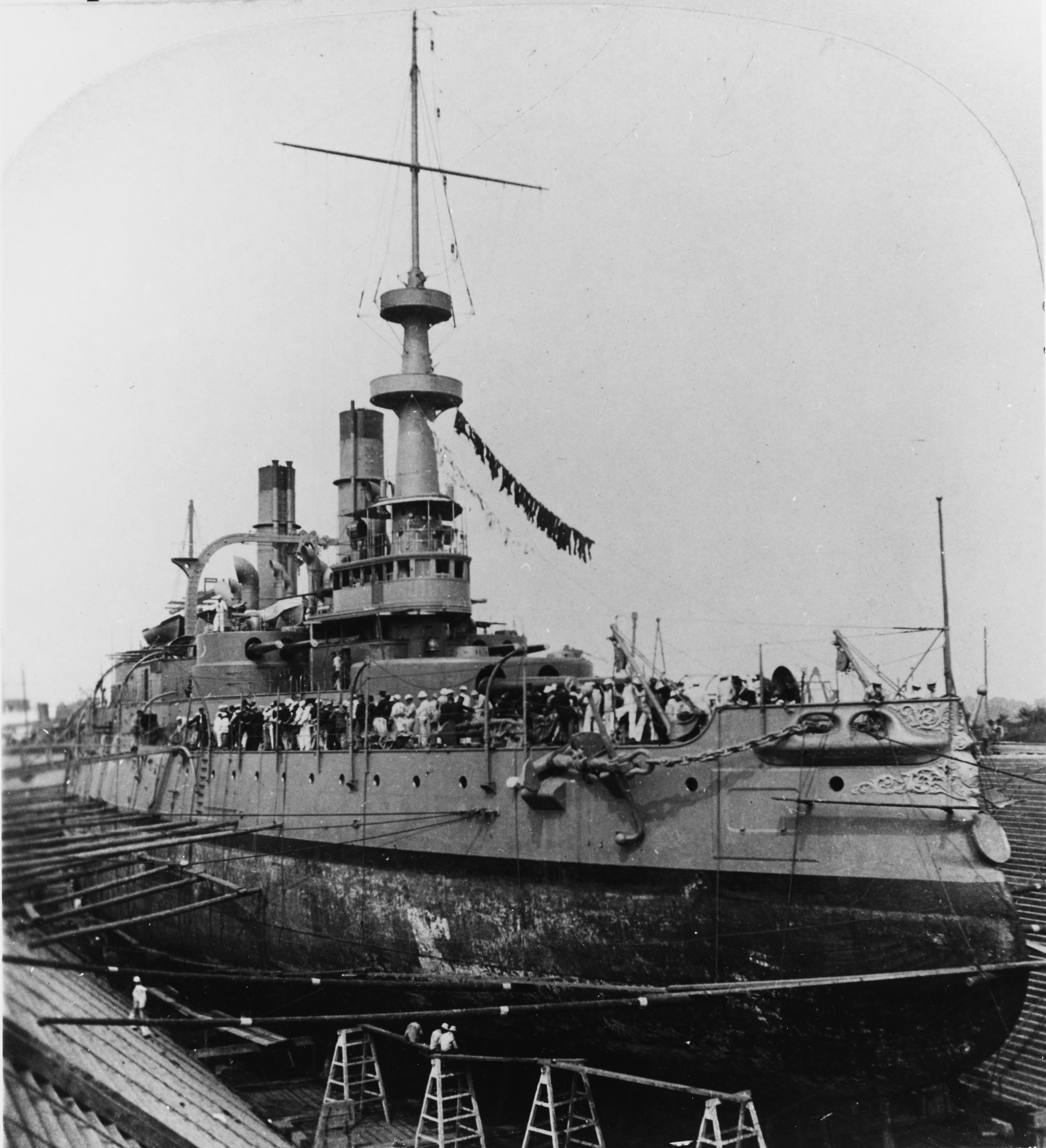
USS Indiana (BB-1) refitting at the yard after the Spanish–American War

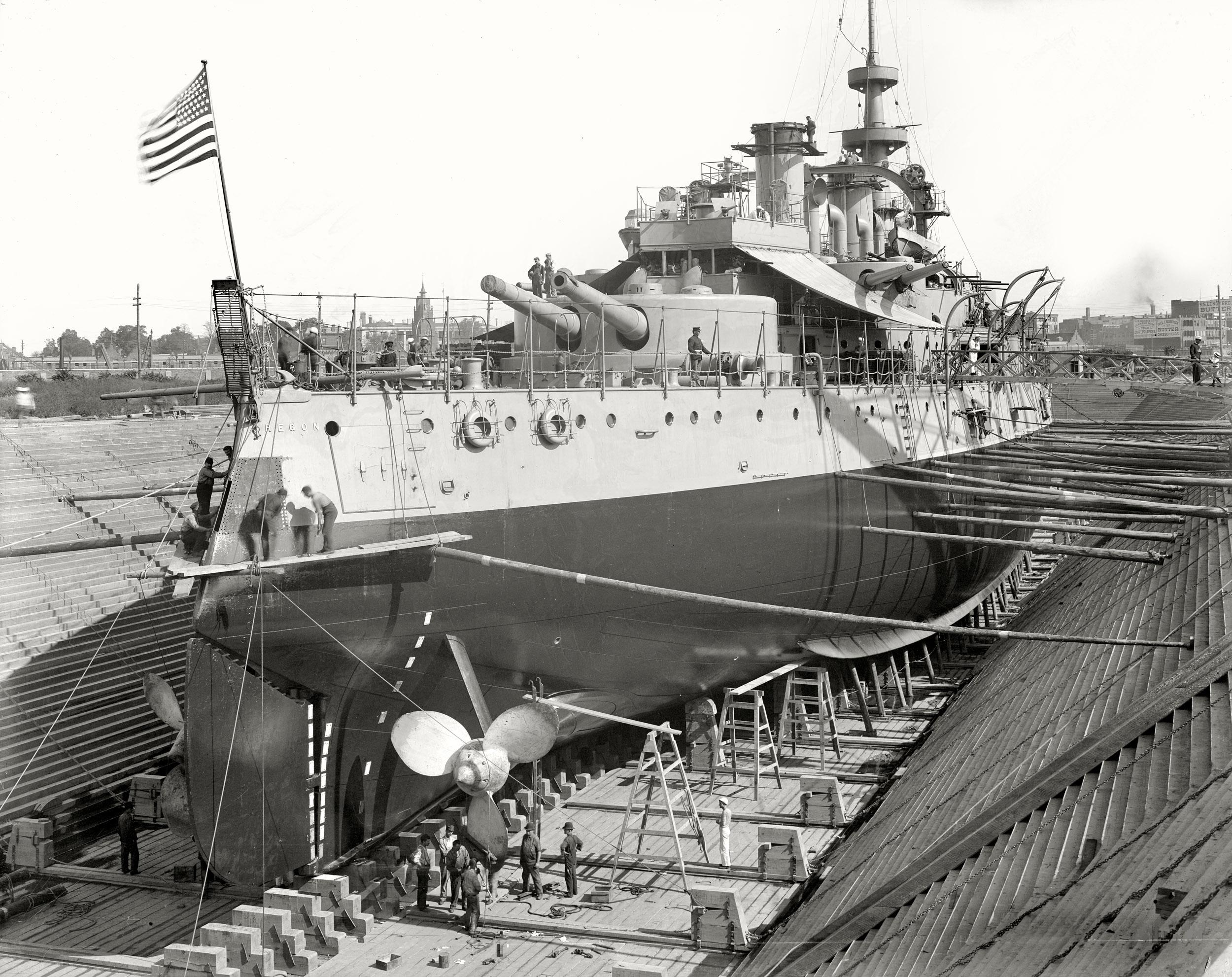
Oregon in the yard in 1898

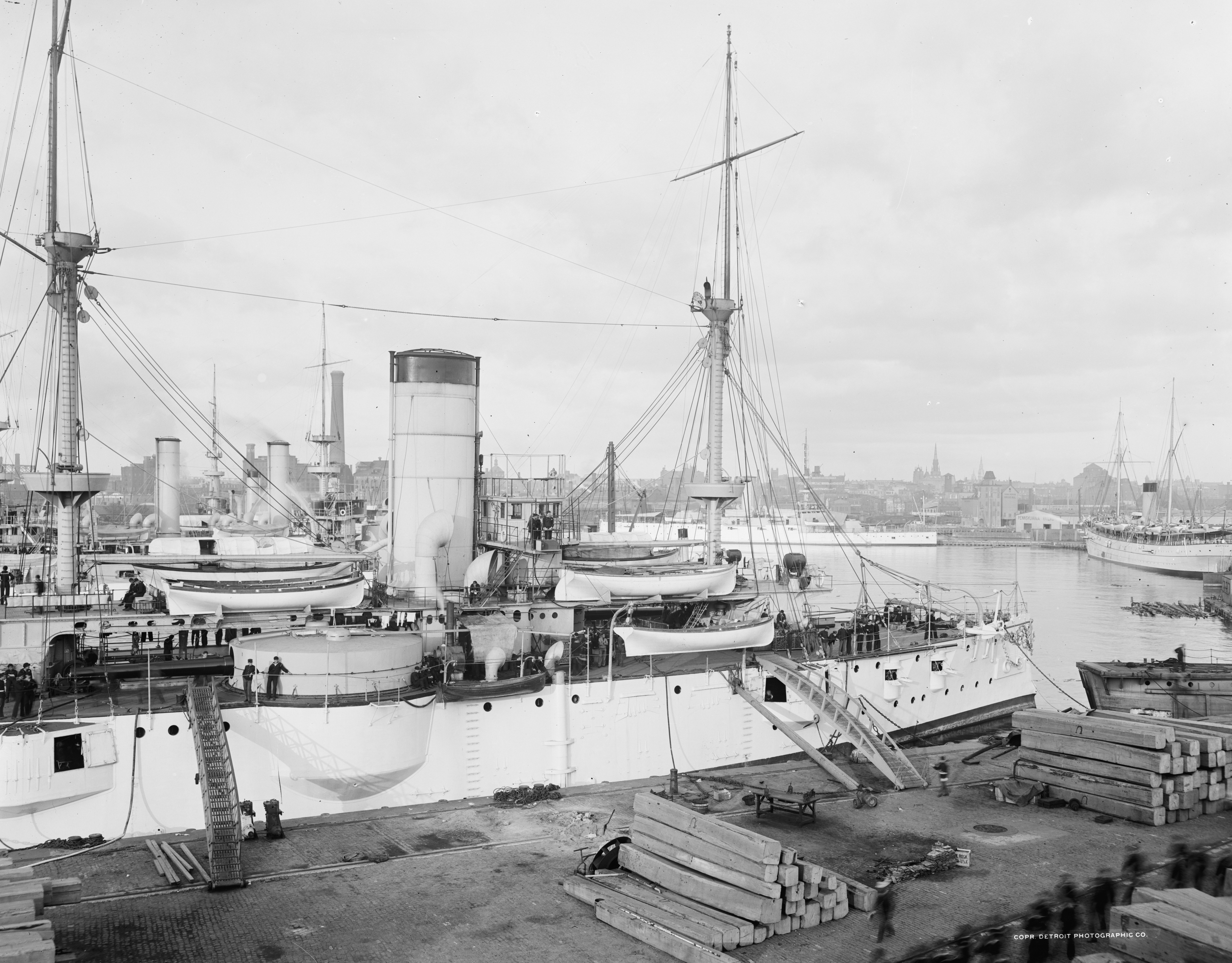
Texas in the yard circa 1903

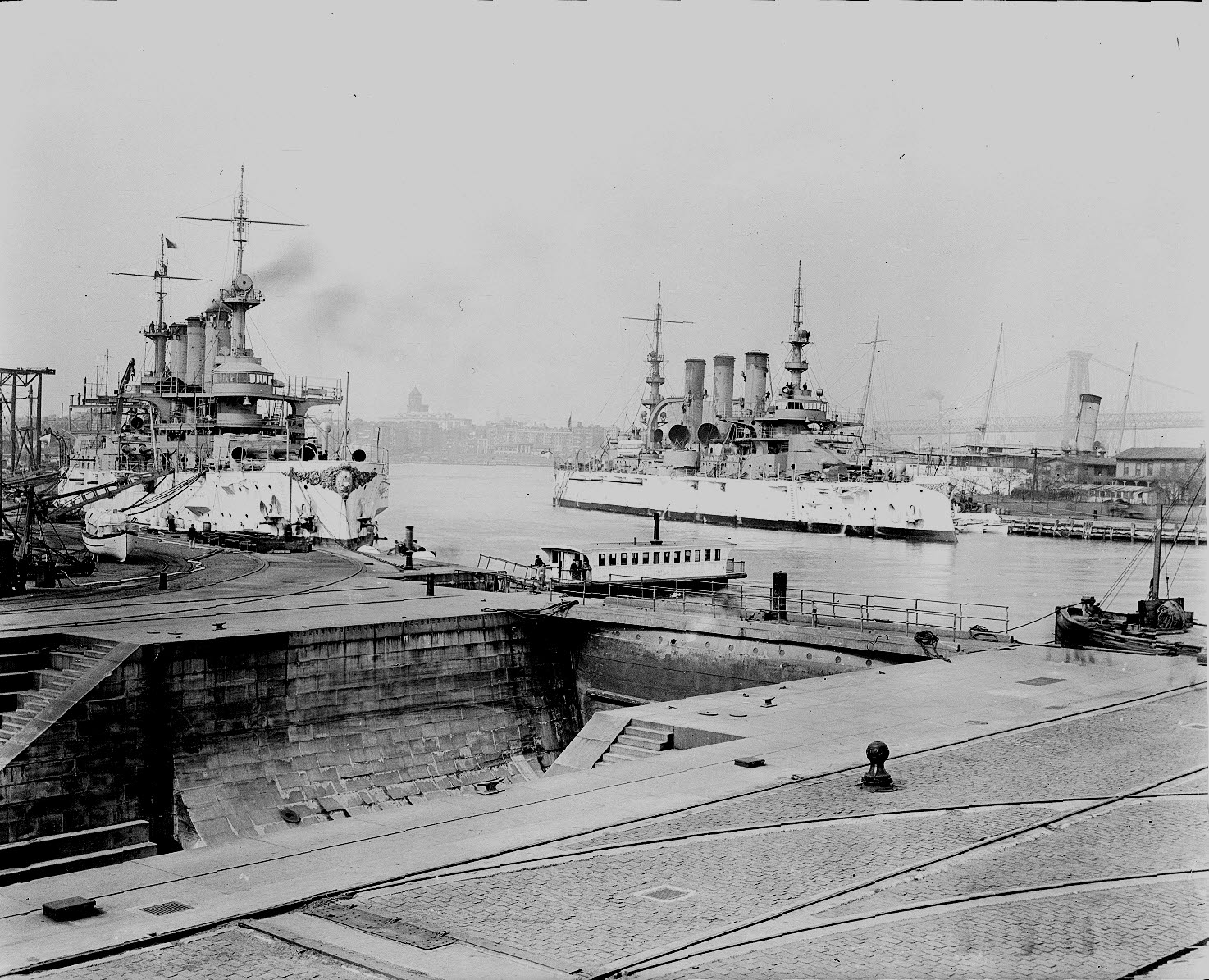
Connecticut and Nebraska in the yard in 1909

==== Land purchase ====
The Jacksons put the land up for sale in 1800, and the federal government soon learned about the sale. On February 7, 1801, federal authorities purchased the old docks and 40 acres (16 ha) of land from John Jackson for $40,000 through an intermediary, Francis Childs. Childs sold the site to the federal government 16 days later. The purchase was part of outgoing U.S. president John Adams's plans to establish a series of naval yards in the United States. This particular site was chosen because it was thought that the plot's location near Lower Manhattan and New York Harbor would be ideal for placing military defenses; however, this never came to fruition.

The property went unused for several years because Adams's successor Thomas Jefferson opposed military build-up. The Brooklyn Navy Yard became an active shipyard for the United States Navy in 1806, when the yard's first commandant Jonathan Thorn moved onto the premises. It took several decades before the Brooklyn Navy Yard was fully developed; for the most part, early development was focused around the western side of the current yard. It was around the same time that Quarters A, the federal-style commandant's house, was built at the northwestern corner of the Brooklyn Navy Yard. In 1810, the federal government acquired another 131 acres (53 ha) of land from the state of New York. Much of this land was underwater at high tide. During the War of 1812, the Brooklyn Navy Yard repaired and retrofitted more than 100 ships, although it was not yet used for shipbuilding.

In January 1812, the President approached the Secretary of the Navy, wishing to explore telegraphy between New York, Washington and other locations, and how this could be done. "A telegraphic communication between Sandy Hook & the Narrows, thence to the City, is immediately desirable," as well as estimates to cost. A prudent response commented on how dense forests made it impractical to implement for long distances. In contrast, the proposed 24-mile network between Sandy Hook and New York could be created at a cost of $500, exclusive of staffing. This was approved, and Isaac Chauncey, as commandant of the New York Naval Shipyard was asked to commence its construction. He was hindered by disapproval from some of the affected property owners. The telegraph network operations began about 1 July. Despite an apparent interest in telegraphy from a number of key decision-makers, the New York–Sandy Hook line was the only active system the Navy had in operation during the War of 1812.

==== Initial operations ====
The first ship of the line built at Brooklyn Navy Yard was USS Ohio, a wooden ship designed by Henry Eckford. Her keel was laid in 1817, and she was launched on May 30, 1820. The yard's first receiving ship, a type of ship used to house new recruits for the Navy, was Robert Fulton's steam frigate, USS Fulton. Fulton was initially called Demologos and was designed as a floating battery to protect the New York Harbor. However, the steamship was deemed inadequate for that purpose, and when Fulton died in 1815, the vessel was rechristened Fulton. Fulton then served as a receiving ship, moored off the shoreline of the Navy Yard until she was destroyed in an explosion on June 4, 1829.

By the 1820s, the Navy Yard consisted of the commandant's house, a Marine barracks building, several smaller buildings, and shiphouses on what is now the northwestern corner of the yard. Of these, the commandant's house is the only remaining structure. The Navy acquired an additional 25 or 33 acres (10 or 13 ha) from Sarah Schenck in 1824, on which it built the Brooklyn Naval Hospital. The same year, it was converted into a "first-class" yard. The hospital opened in 1838. During the Great Fire of New York on December 16, 1835, the Navy Yard sent a detachment of U.S. Marines and sailors to help fight the fire, which had quickly consumed much of which is now the Financial District. The detachment detonated buildings in the fire's path, which created fire breaks and reduced the fire's ability to spread, leading The Long Island Star to report that the "detachment of Marines from the navy yard under Lieutenant Reynolds and sailors under Captain Mix rendered the most valuable service..." Similarly. during the Great Fire in Lower Manhattan on July 19, 1845, "a detachment of sailors and Marines from the navy yard under Captain Hudson, were present, and did good service. The USS North Carolina which was acting as a receiving ship for new enlisted men, also sent her sailors in boats for shore duty." The Navy Yard also sent materials for blowing up buildings and creating firebreaks.

Admiral Matthew C. Perry arrived at the Brooklyn Navy Yard in 1831, and was commandant from 1841 to 1843. Perry helped found the United States Naval Lyceum at the Navy Yard in 1833. Its first president was Charles G. Ridgeley. The Lyceum, which was housed in a handsome brick building, published several magazines and maintained a museum of documents from around the world. Its membership included junior officers, lieutenants, midshipmen, and several U.S. presidents. When the Lyceum disbanded in 1889, its documents and artifacts were transferred to the U.S. Naval Academy Museum in Maryland, and the museum building was demolished. In addition, when the U.S. Navy's first steam warship Fulton II was built at the Brooklyn Navy Yard in 1837, Perry helped supervise the vessel's construction, and he later became her first commander. Perry was also present during the construction of Dry Dock A, but he left his position as commandant of the Brooklyn Navy Yard in 1843.

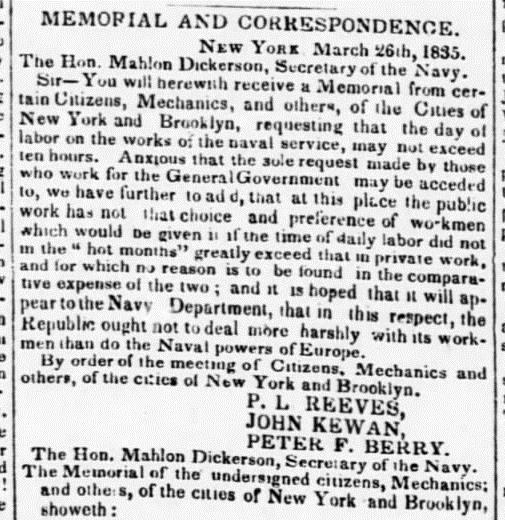
A Petition, for the Ten Hour Day, dated March 26, 1835, signed by Brooklyn Navy Yard mechanics, requesting "that the day of labor on the works of the naval service, may not exceed ten hours."

==== Early civilian employees ====
Early Brooklyn Navy Yard mechanics and laborers were per diem employees, paid by the day. As per diem employees they were rarely in a position to negotiate wages. Commodore Isaac Chauncey writing to the Secretary of the Navy Robert Smith on January 5, 1808, declared "I however was able to find a sufficient number willing to work at the reduced wages and these who refused will in a week come back and beg for work and I shall be able to reduce their wages 25 cents more for the merchants have no work for them to do, therefore, they must either work for us at our price or go unemployed to induce the merchants to believe the government is not fully determined to build the twenty three Gun Boats at this place I have given out that they are to be built where they can be built cheapest..." Wages fluctuated significantly based on the congressional apportionment for that year. For example in May 1820, the Board of Navy Commissioners, directed Captain Samuel Evans, the pay of shipyard carpenters was to be reduced 1.62 1/2 cents per day to 1.25 per day, likewise laborers pay was reduced from 90 cents per day to 75. The Brooklyn Navy Yard soon became a large employer because of the expansion of shipbuilding. 1835 was an important year for American labor, with workers in major Northeastern cities petitioning for higher wages; better working conditions, and a ten-hour workday. On March 26, 1835, the mechanics in the New York Navy Yard petitioned the Board of Navy Commissioners to reduce the workday to ten hours, which was "signed by one thousand citizens of New York and Brooklyn." On April 24, 1835, the Board, rejected their petition, because "it would be inconsistent with the public interests, to regulate the working hours in the Navy Yards as proposed in the memorial". The ten-hour workday would not be implemented until March 31, 1840, when President Martin Van Buren finally mandated a ten-hour workday for all mechanics and laborers employed on public works." In 1848, the yard had 441 employees who typically worked a ten hour day, six days a week.

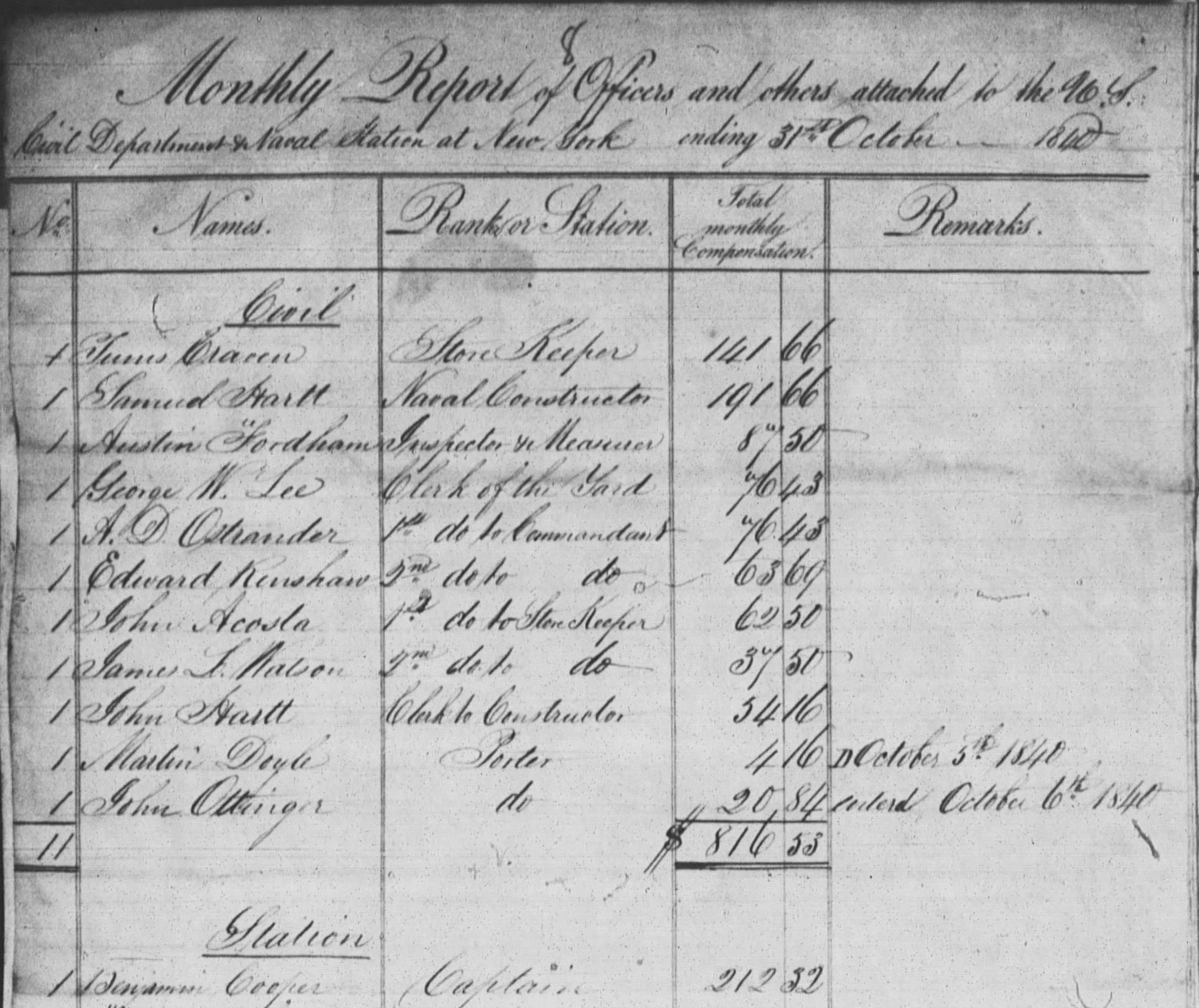
New York Navy Yard,(Brooklyn), Monthly Report of Officers and Others, October 1840

==== Creation of street grid ====
In 1826, the United States Congress required all of the United States' naval yards to procure a master plan for future development. Because of various issues such as the muddy geography, the narrowness of the nearby shipping channel, the Brooklyn Navy Yard's small size, and the density of existing development in the surrounding area, the Navy was unable to submit a feasible master plan for the yard.

The engineer Loammi Baldwin Jr. was hired to create a design for building a dry dock at the yard in 1825. Baldwin's plan, published in 1826, created a street grid system for the Brooklyn Navy Yard. Two other dry docks were designed: Drydock One at the Boston Navy Yard, and Drydock One at the Norfolk Naval Shipyard. Because of a lack of funds, construction of the Brooklyn Navy Yard's dock was delayed until 1836, when the two other dry docks were completed. Construction on the dry dock started in 1841, and it was completed in 1851. In the mid-19th century, the boundaries of Wallabout Creek were placed in a channel, and the creek was dredged, contributing to the surrounding area's development as an industrial shipyard.

=== Mid- and late 19th century ===
==== Civil War ====
By 1860, just before the American Civil War, many European immigrants had moved to Brooklyn, which had become one of the largest cities in the United States (it was not part of New York City until 1898). The yard had expanded to employ thousand of skilled mechanics with men working around the clock. At the start of the war, in 1861, the Brooklyn Navy Yard had 3,700 workers. The navy yard station logs for January 17, 1863, reflected 3,933 workers on the payroll. The yard employed 6,200 men by the end of the war in 1865.

During the Civil War, the Brooklyn Navy Yard manufactured 14 large vessels and retrofitted another 416 commercial vessels to support the Union's naval blockades against the Confederate Navy. Monticello was rumored to have been retrofitted within less than 24 hours. For three months following President Lincoln's "75,000 volunteers" proclamation in April 1861, the Navy Yard was busy placing weapons and armaments on vessels, or refurbishing existing weapons and armaments. In an article published that July, The New York Times stated, "For several weeks hands have been kept at work incessantly, often at night and on the Sabbath." The screw steam sloop Oneida, launched on November 20, 1861, was the first vessel built at the Navy Yard that was specifically intended for the American Civil War. She participated in the Battle of Forts Jackson and St. Philip in 1862, and in the Battle of Mobile Bay in 1864. Another vessel that was outfitted at the Navy Yard was Monitor, built at the Continental Iron Works in Greenpoint, Brooklyn, and commissioned at Brooklyn Navy Yard on February 25, 1862. Later that year she fought CSS Virginia (originally USS Merrimack) at the Battle of Hampton Roads. Other vessels built for the Union Navy during this time included Adirondack, Ticonderoga, Shamrock, Mackinaw, Peoria, Tullahoma, Maumee, Nyack, Wampanoag, and Miantonomoh.

Because of the Navy Yard's role in creating ships for Union blockades of the Confederacy, it was a target for Confederate supporters, who would attempt to ignite the yard's storage facilities. After the Union Navy quickly realized the plot, it mobilized sailors and Brooklyn metropolitan police to keep watch around the yard, and the Confederates never tried to mount a real attack.

==== After the Civil War ====
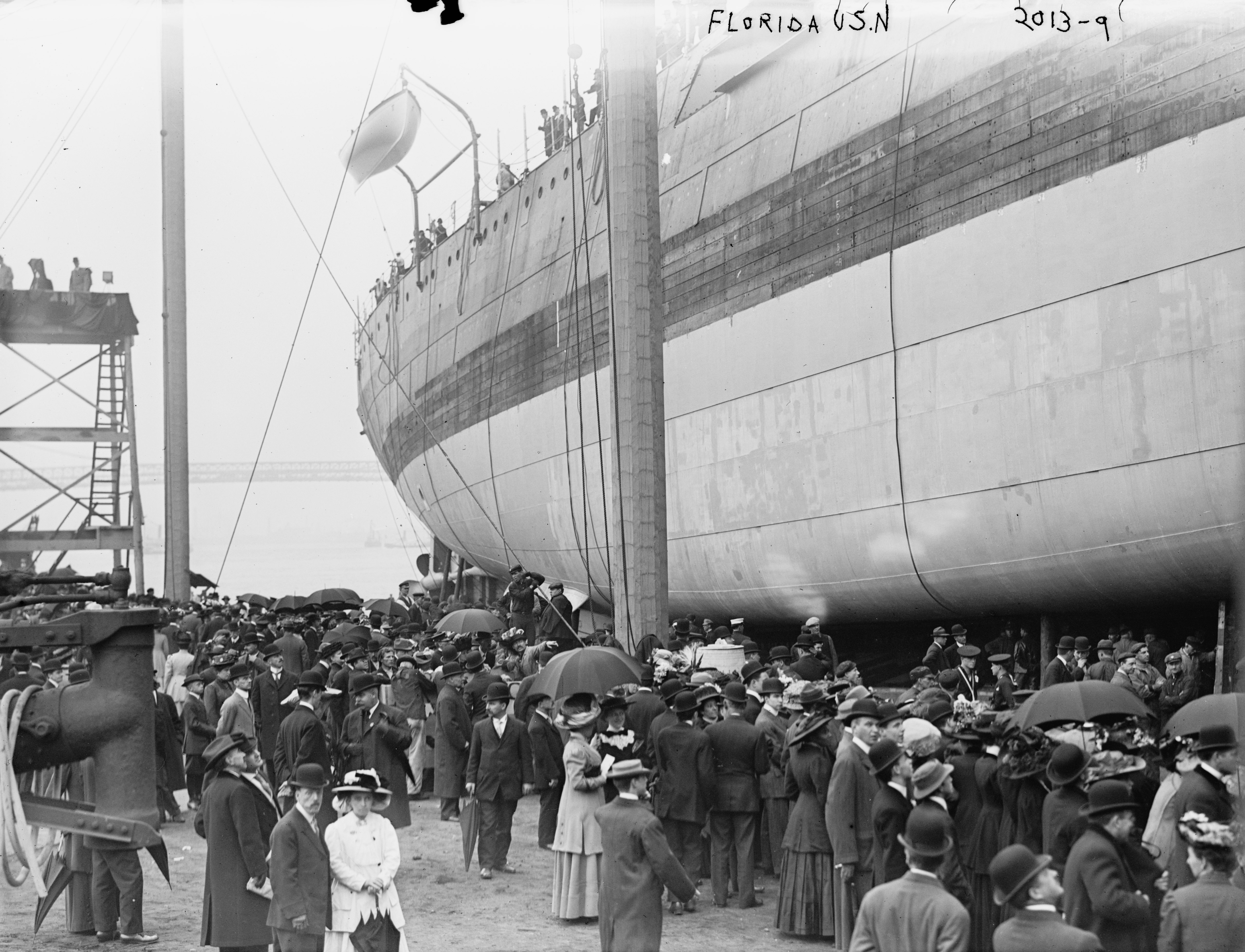
USS Florida, seen at the Brooklyn Navy Yard

In 1866, following the end of the Civil War, there was a large decrease in the number of people working at the Brooklyn Navy Yard, although the yard continued to finish off the vessels that were already under construction. Shipbuilding methods had improved greatly during the war, and the shipbuilding technology that the Navy used was now obsolete; this was compounded by a series of other problems that the Navy faced in general, such as corruption. Likely as a result, the Brooklyn Navy Yard did not start construction on any vessels between 1866 and 1872. Some boats were launched during this period, such as Kenosha, which was launched in 1868. By the late 1860s and early 1870s, the Navy Yard was creating iron steam vessels, as they were faster and easier to maneuver compared to wooden vessels. An iron plating shop had been constructed for the construction of such vessels. Trenton, launched in 1876, was the final wooden vessel with sails that was constructed at the Brooklyn Navy Yard. During the late 19th century, there were calls to close the shipyard permanently, although these never came to fruition.

By 1872, there were 1,200 people on the Brooklyn Navy Yard's payroll, a number that could be increased fourfold in case of war. Workers at the Brooklyn Navy Yard, who were employees of the federal government, received employment protections that were considered novel at the time. For instance, an act passed in 1867 protected Navy Yard employees' rights to political free speech, and an act passed in 1872 restricted laborers, mechanics, and workmen from working more than eight hours per day.

By the end of the 1880s, the shipbuilding industry at Brooklyn Navy Yard was active again, as the Navy started expanding its fleet. The Navy Yard created larger battleships, as well as torpedo boats and submarines, and many of the vessels launched from the yard featured modern ordnance, propulsion systems, navigation, and armor. The new construction required expanded shipways for launching ships. Since 1820, the Brooklyn Navy Yard had used wooden slipways, with wooden ship houses above each slipway, which protected the wooden ships' hulls, but in the 1880s, these slipways were updated with granite girders.

The Navy also constructed two additional dry docks, both of which soon encountered problems. Dry Dock 2, originally a timber dry dock, was built in 1887 and soon encountered problems due to its poor construction quality. Dry Dock 2 collapsed in a severe storm in July 1899 and was rebuilt in masonry in 1901. Dry Dock 3, a timber dock, was similar in design to Dry Dock 2. It started construction in 1893 and was completed in 1897. Shortly afterward, Dry Dock 3 was found to be too short by four inches and too shallow by two feet, so it was fixed. The initial timber construction of Dry Docks 2 and 3 required a large maintenance cost, unlike for the masonry Dry Dock 1, which had required only one reconstruction in 40 years. Both dry docks still exist, but are now inactive. To support the additional dry docks and shipway capacity, several structures such as large machine shops, an administration building, and a pattern building were constructed in the 1890s.

Unlike other U.S. Navy shipyards at this time, the Brooklyn Navy Yard was very active in shipbuilding. One of the most notable ships from the Brooklyn Navy Yard during the late 19th century was Maine, which was launched from Building Way 1, the new slipway. Maine's keel was laid in 1888, launched in 1895, and destroyed in Cuba's Havana Harbor in 1898. USS Cincinnati, laid down in 1892 and commissioned in 1894, was the lead cruiser of the Cincinnati class.

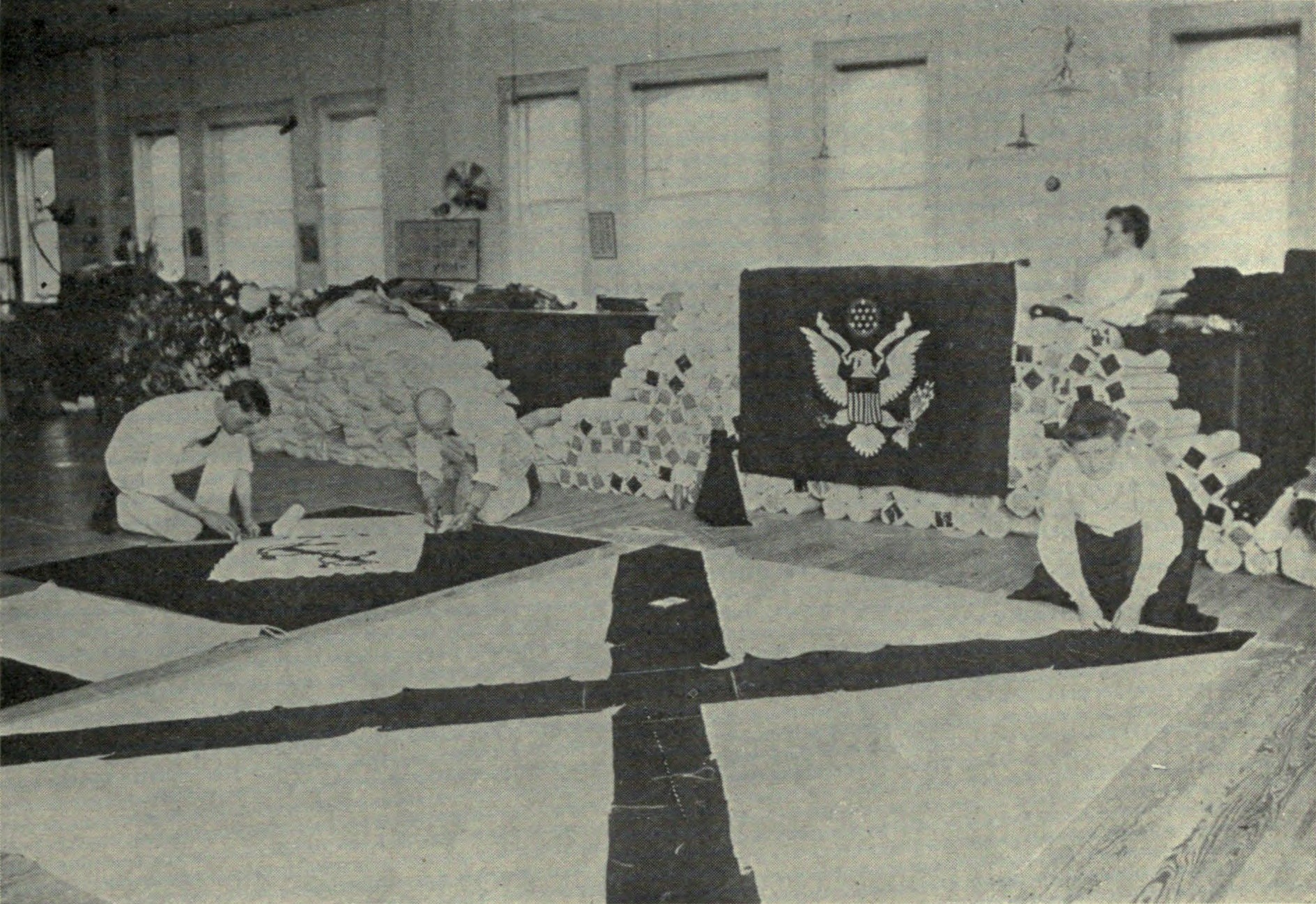
Quarterwoman Mary Ann Woods and flag-makers making president's flag in 1914

The Brooklyn Navy Yard required large quantities of national flags, naval pennants and canvas gunpowder bags. The task of sewing these materials had historically been performed by men, but the yard began hiring women for the task due to a need for skilled labor. By the late 1890s, many of the yard's newly hired flag makers were women, and most of these women were widows of soldiers killed in war. The flag makers, working up to 14 hours a day, had to sew 30 to 40 flags per ship. One of these women was Mary Ann Woods, a seamstress flag maker first class who was hired in 1882 and promoted to "Quarterwoman Flag Maker" in 1898.

=== 20th-century operations ===
==== 1900s and 1910s ====
After Brooklyn was annexed to New York City in 1898, it experienced rapid development, including the construction of the Williamsburg and Manhattan Bridges to Manhattan, as well as the first New York City Subway lines, which were constructed by the Interborough Rapid Transit Company. The Brooklyn Navy Yard benefited from this, as it was very close to the Manhattan Bridge, and residents of Manhattan could easily access the Navy Yard. There was a large labor force, which was mainly composed of immigrants who had recently come to New York City through Ellis Island. Around this time, there was a proposal to move the Navy Yard to Communipaw, New Jersey, or simply close the yard altogether, but it did not succeed.

After the U.S. won the Spanish–American War of 1898, President Theodore Roosevelt, a former assistant secretary of the Navy, built up Navy presence. As such he arranged to build sixteen ships for a "goodwill tour" of the world. The main ship, USS Connecticut, was laid down at the Brooklyn Navy Yard in 1903 and launched in 1904; she was also the flagship vessel of the Connecticut-class battleships. To accommodate the construction of Connecticut, Building Way 1 was rebuilt in 1903. Another slipway, Building Way 2, was built in 1917, at the same time that Building Way 1 was enlarged. Building Ways 1 and 2 were collectively referred to as the Connecticut building ways. The shipways were used to launch dreadnoughts, large battleships with heavy guns. One such vessel was USS Florida, the lead ship of the Florida-class battleships, which was launched in 1910. Other lead battleships launched from the Connecticut building ways included New York in 1912, Arizona in 1915, New Mexico in 1917, and Tennessee in 1919. By this time, all vessels at Brooklyn Navy Yard were constructed outdoors, rather than inside shipbuilding houses, as it was easier for overhead cranes.

During this time, the waterfront was rebuilt. Dry Dock 4, a brick-and-concrete dry dock with a capacity for ships of up to 717 feet (219 m) long, was planned in 1900 and constructed between 1905 and 1913. During construction, serious problems with quicksand ultimately killed 20 workers and injured 400 others. After the project was abandoned by five different private builders, the federal government intervened to complete Dry Dock 4, which became known as the "Hoodoo" dock. In conjunction with Dry Dock 4's construction, it was also proposed to lengthen the wooden Dry Dock 3 from 668 to 800 feet (204 to 244 m) long. A paymasters' office, a construction and repair shop/storehouse, and a locomotive shed for the Navy Yard's now-defunct railroad system were also constructed. By 1914, the Navy Yard comprised a 114-acre (46 ha) area.

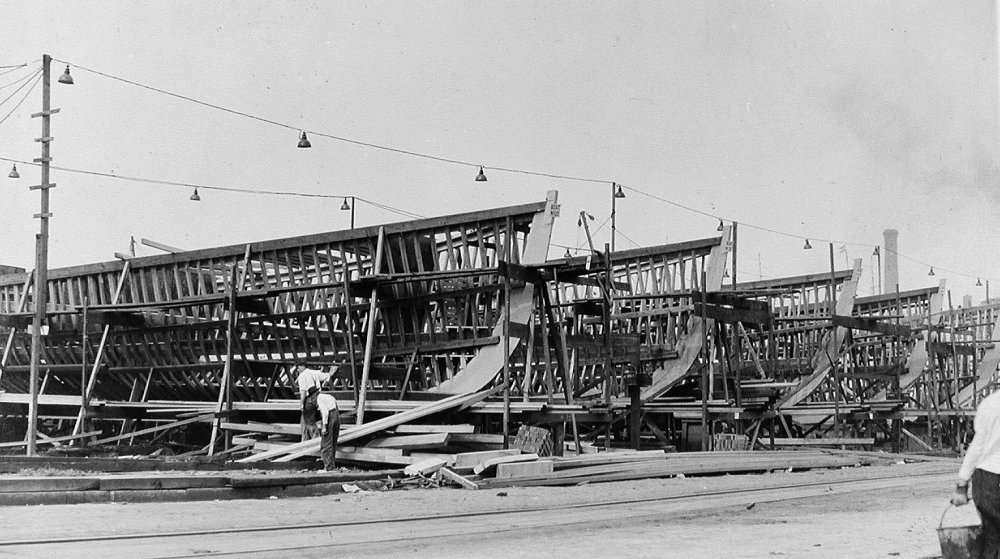
SC-1-class submarine chasers being built at the Brooklyn Navy Yard in 1917

Although World War I started in 1914, it had gone on for several years without American intervention prior to the American entry into World War I on April 6, 1917. The Brooklyn Navy Yard's workforce of 6,000 grew to 18,000 within a year, and a temporary camp was erected outside the Navy Yard's grounds. In preparation for the war, ID cards were issued to Navy Yard employees to prevent against sabotage, and Liberty Loan Rallies were held at the Navy Yard's boat shop. The Secretary of the U.S. Navy, Josephus Daniels, argued that the Brooklyn Navy Yard had to be expanded even further to the west to allow for more shipbuilding activities. In the meantime, non-essential activities were moved to the Bush Terminal in Sunset Park, Brooklyn. Several new buildings were built in response to the U.S.'s entry into World War I, including a locomotive roundhouse, supply storehouse, boat shed, structural shop, and light machine shop, as well as Pier C and Machine Way 2. Most of these structures were connected to the four dry docks and two shipways via the Brooklyn Navy Yard's railroad system. By the end of 1918, the U.S. government had made $40 million of investment into the Navy Yard to date (equivalent to $856,000,000 in 2025).

During World War I, the six naval shipyards at Brooklyn, Boston, Charleston (South Carolina), Norfolk, Portsmouth (Maine), and Philadelphia started specializing in the construction of different vessel types for the war effort. The Brooklyn Navy Yard specialized in creating submarine chasers, manufacturing 49 of them in the span of eighteen months. World War I ended in 1918, and, in the aftermath of the war, Tennessee was the last World War I battleship constructed at the Brooklyn Navy Yard. No new vessels were completed for ten years until USS Pensacola in 1929.

==== 1920s and 1930s ====
In 1920, after World War I ended, the Brooklyn Navy Yard started constructing South Dakota and Indiana, both of them South Dakota-class battleships. The Washington Naval Treaty of 1921–1922, a peace treaty between the United States and four other countries, limited the signatories' construction of battleships, battlecruisers, and aircraft carriers. As a result, there was no need to continue constructing South Dakota and Indiana, nor to continue employing the shipbuilders who were working on these boats. Starting in 1921, large numbers of Navy Yard workers were fired, and by December 1921, 10,000 workers had been fired. Work on the partially completed South Dakota and Indiana was halted in February 1922, and both vessels were ordered to be scrapped. Congress did not allocate funding for the construction of any other ships. As such, until 1929, the workers who remained were tasked mostly with repairing ships at the dry docks.

Pensacola, one of eight "treaty ships" authorized in 1924 after the Washington conference, was launched from the Brooklyn Navy Yard in April 1929. and she was completed and commissioned the next year. The completion of Pensacola occurred at the start of the Great Depression, and as a result, the workforce of 4,000 was reduced by one-quarter immediately afterward. Due to delays in the signing of the London Naval Treaty, as well as a two-year extension of the Washington treaty, the keel of the next ship, New Orleans, was not laid until 1931. However, the yard remained open for routine ship maintenance.

The election of President Franklin D. Roosevelt in 1933, combined with fraying relations with Germany, Italy, and Japan, resulted in a resumption of shipbuilding activities for the Brooklyn Navy Yard. USS Brooklyn, the lead ship of the Brooklyn-class cruisers, was laid at the yard in March 1935. By the end of 1935, ten cruisers were being constructed. Dry Dock 4 was lengthened slightly to accommodate the keel-laying of the battleship North Carolina in 1937.

The new construction required extra workers. By 1935, the Brooklyn Navy Yard had 4,000 workers. All were well-paid, receiving six days' worth of salary for every five-day workweek, and civilians received sizable retirement funds based on the length of their service. The Brooklyn Navy Yard employed 8,200 men by mid-1936, of which 6,500 were constructing ships and 1,700 were hired through WPA programs. By 1938, the yard employed about 10,000 men, of whom one-third received salaries from the WPA. At the time, the surrounding neighborhood was run-down with various saloons and dilapidated houses, as described in the Works Progress Administration (WPA)'s 1939 Guide to New York City. It was hoped that the extra work would help rehabilitate the area. Workers erected a garbage incinerator, garage, a coal plant office, and a seawall; in addition, they paved the Navy Yard's roads and laid new railroad tracks.

==== World War II ====
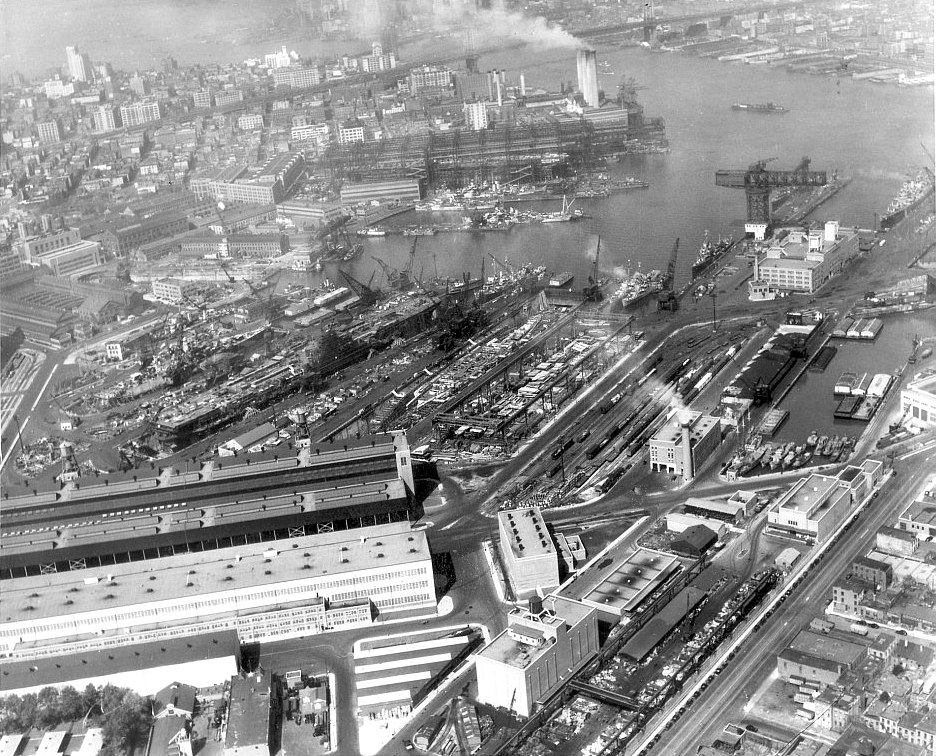
The Navy Yard in 1945

In preparation for World War II, the Brooklyn Navy Yard was extensively reconstructed. The Navy Yard was expanded slightly to the west by 1.5 acres (0.61 ha), bringing its total area to 356 acres (144 ha), and parts of the mid-19th-century street grid were eliminated in favor of new developments. These structures included the construction of an 800-by-100-foot (244 by 30 m), single-story turret-and-erection shop; the expansion of the Connecticut building ways; and lengthening of Dry Dock 4. By 1939, the yard contained more than five miles (8.0 km) of paved streets, four drydocks ranging in length from 326 to 700 ft (99 to 213 m), two steel shipways, and six pontoons and cylindrical floats for salvage work, barracks for marines, a power plant, a large radio station, and a railroad spur, as well as foundries, machine shops, and warehouses. The new construction involved extensive landfilling operations, some of which yielded artifacts that were centuries old. In one instance, a Civil War-era prison brig was found eight feet underground, while in another, workers unearthed a skeleton thought to be from one of the prison ship martyrs.

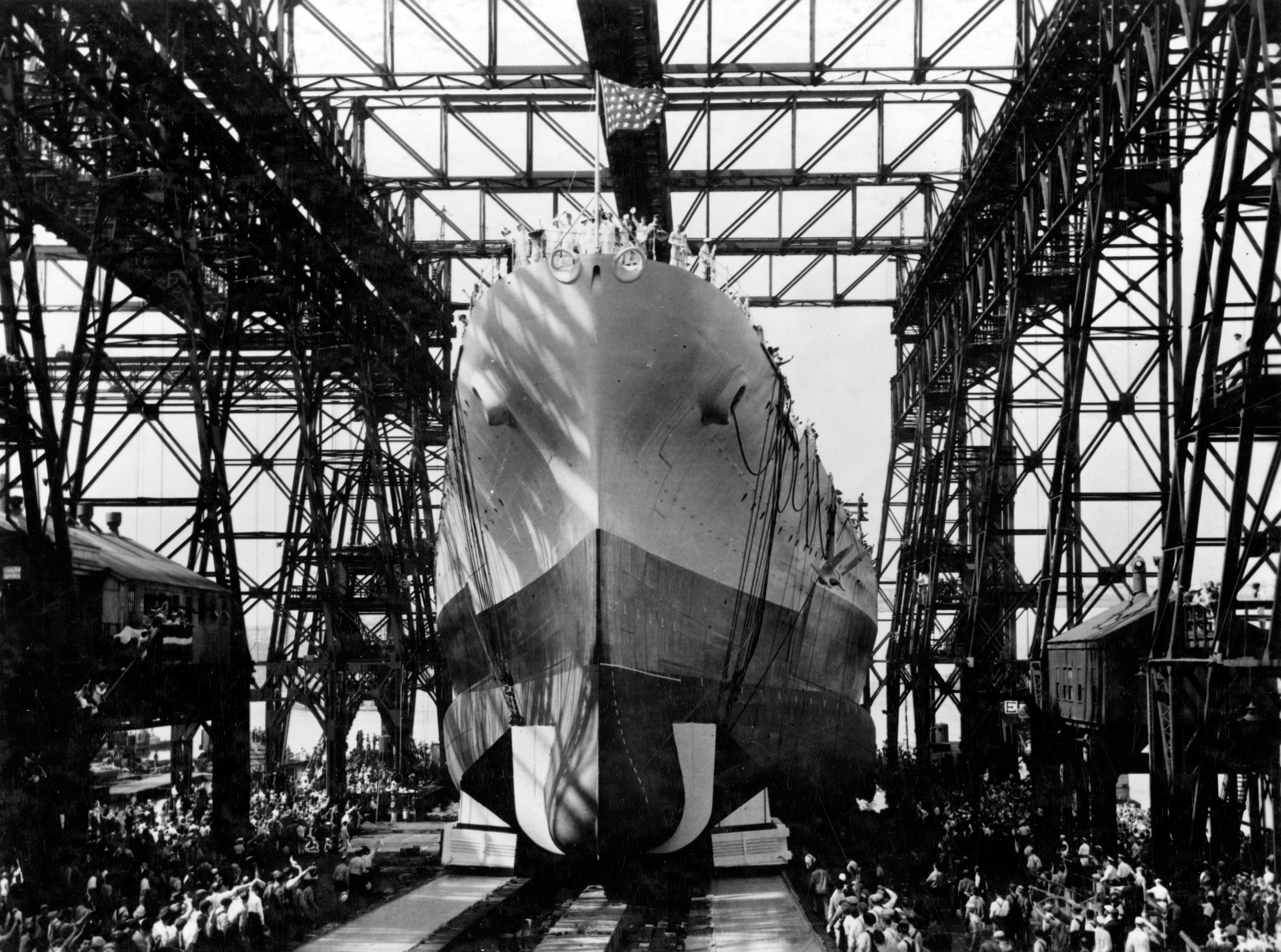
Launching of USS North Carolina in June 1940

The naval shipyards in Brooklyn and Philadelphia were designated for the construction of battleships. The first World War II-era battleship built at Brooklyn Navy Yard was North Carolina, which started construction in 1937 and was commissioned in April 1941. A second battleship, Iowa, started construction at Brooklyn Navy Yard in 1939 and was completed in 1942. The third battleship to be constructed at Brooklyn Navy Yard was Missouri, which was launched in 1944 and was the site of the surrender of Japan on September 2, 1945. After the completion of the battleships, two aircraft carrier orders were placed: one for USS Bennington, laid down in December 1942, and one for USS Franklin D. Roosevelt, laid in 1944. According to the National Park Service, the Brooklyn Navy Yard eventually constructed "three battleships, two floating workshops, eight tank landing ships, and countless barges and lighters". The yard also outfitted 250 ships for battle, as well as made repairs to 5,000 ships.

To accommodate the construction of the battleships, dry docks 5 and 6 were constructed. The Navy re-acquired 25 acres (10 ha) of land, which had been sold to New York City in the 1890s to create Wallabout Market. The original plans were to build the dry docks in Bayonne, New Jersey, but that location was unsuitable due to its proximity to a munitions arsenal, and the dry docks at Brooklyn Navy Yard were approved in 1941. The docks would be 1,500 feet (460 m) long by 200 ft (61 m) wide and 60 ft (18 m) deep; at the time, there were no battleships that large. The docks were ultimately built at a length of 1,067 ft (325 m), which still made them longer than any of the other dry docks. Construction contracts were awarded in 1941. Several structures were demolished, including the market and the Cob Dock. Additionally, a branch of Wallabout Basin that led to the market was filled in, and about 2.3 million cubic yards (1,800,000 m^{3}) of silt was dredged from the basin. The neighboring Kent Avenue basin on the east side of the site was also filled in. Afterward, 13,000 piles were driven into the sandy bottom of the basin, and two hundred concrete forms were poured at a rate of 350 cubic yards (270 m^{3}) per hour. Dry Dock 5 was completed by 1942. The work also entailed the construction of piers J and K, as well as a 350-short-ton (310-long-ton) hammerhead crane at Pier G, added in 1943.

The Brooklyn Navy Yard was employing 18,000 workers in December 1941, just after the attack on Pearl Harbor. Following Pearl Harbor, the U.S. officially entered World War II and the number of employees at Brooklyn Navy Yard increased. By June 1942, more than 42,000 workers were employed. The Brooklyn Navy Yard started 24/7 operations, and three shifts of eight hours were implemented. In addition to shipbuilding, workers at the yard created uniforms and flags, as well as packaged food and combat provisions for sailors and soldiers. During the peak of World War II, the yard employed 75,000 people and had a payroll of $15 million per month. The yard was nicknamed "The Can-Do Shipyard" because of its massive output in constructing dozens of ships and replacing hundreds more. Up until the war ended in 1945, the U.S. Navy awarded the Brooklyn Navy Yard an "E" for Excellence award annually.

During World War II, the navy yard began to train and employ women and minority workers in positions formerly held by white men who had since joined the armed forces. The women mainly built ships, aircraft, and weapons, as well as communications equipment, small arms, and rubber goods. Other women worked in the WAVES division where they operated communications equipment and decoded messages. There were 200 women employed at the Brooklyn Navy Yard by 1942. However, women working in the yard faced sex discrimination and a gender pay gap, which prevented them from advancing to higher-level positions, and many women held "helper" positions to the remaining skilled male workers. After the passage of the Fair Employment Practices Act of 1941, African Americans were also hired for trade work at the Brooklyn Navy Yard, a sector in which they previously had been banned from working. By January 1945, at peak employment, 4,657 women were working in skilled trades at the Brooklyn Navy Yard, such as pipe-fitters, electricians, welders, crane operators, truck drivers, and sheet metal workers. Another 2,300 women worked in administrative jobs. Combined, women made up 10% of the Navy Yard's workforce, though this was lower than the industry-wide female employment rate of 11.5%; minorities, mostly African Americans, made up 8% of the workforce. After the war, most of the women were terminated from their positions, and by 1946 the production workforce was composed entirely of men. The minority workforce continued to grow through the 1960s, when minorities made up a fifth of all workers at the Brooklyn Navy Yard.

The Navy constructed at least 18 buildings at the Brooklyn Navy Yard during World War II, using any available land. These structures included a materials testing laboratory, a foundry, two sub-assembly shops, an ordnance machine shop, and a building trades shop. The sub-assembly structures were constructed at the end of each dry dock; they each measured 800 by 100 feet (244 by 30 m) in perimeter and 105 feet (32 m) tall. They fabricated sections of the ships before the completed pieces were joined to the hull, which, along with the introduction of welding, allowed for increased efficiency in the shipbuilding process. Another large structure constructed at the Navy Yard was Building 77, a sixteen-story building that served as the yard headquarters, as well as storage space. In addition, a housing development was built exclusively for Navy Yard workers in Fort Greene, a neighborhood located immediately south of the Navy Yard. The development, the Fort Greene Houses, was completed in 1942. A motion picture exchange for armed forces was constructed at the eastern end of the Brooklyn Navy Yard, near the naval hospital, and served to restore, review, and distribute films for use by U.S. Navy troops around the world.

==== After World War II ====
In November 1945, the Brooklyn Navy Yard was formally renamed the "New York Naval Shipyard", per an order from the federal government. From the yard's establishment in 1801 until the name change, the yard had been officially named the "New York Navy Yard", but the public popularly referred to the yard as "Brooklyn Navy Yard", and the government called it "United States Naval Shipyard, Brooklyn". According to one naval officer, the name change was conducted because "it would lead to better efficiency".

Following the end of World War II in 1945, industrial demand in Brooklyn declined sharply, and many white families moved away from Brooklyn to suburbs on Long Island. Public housing developments were built around the New York Naval Shipyard. The construction of the elevated Brooklyn–Queens Expressway to the south further isolated the shipyard from the surrounding community, although the segment of the expressway near the navy yard did not open until 1960. The workforce was scaled down to approximately 10,000 people by the end of 1947. At the same time, the Navy was selling off unused fleet, and new contracts for Navy vessels were being awarded to private shipyards. The New York Naval Shipyard celebrated its 150th anniversary in 1951. By this time, the yard had mostly shifted to manufacturing aircraft carriers, three of which were under construction.

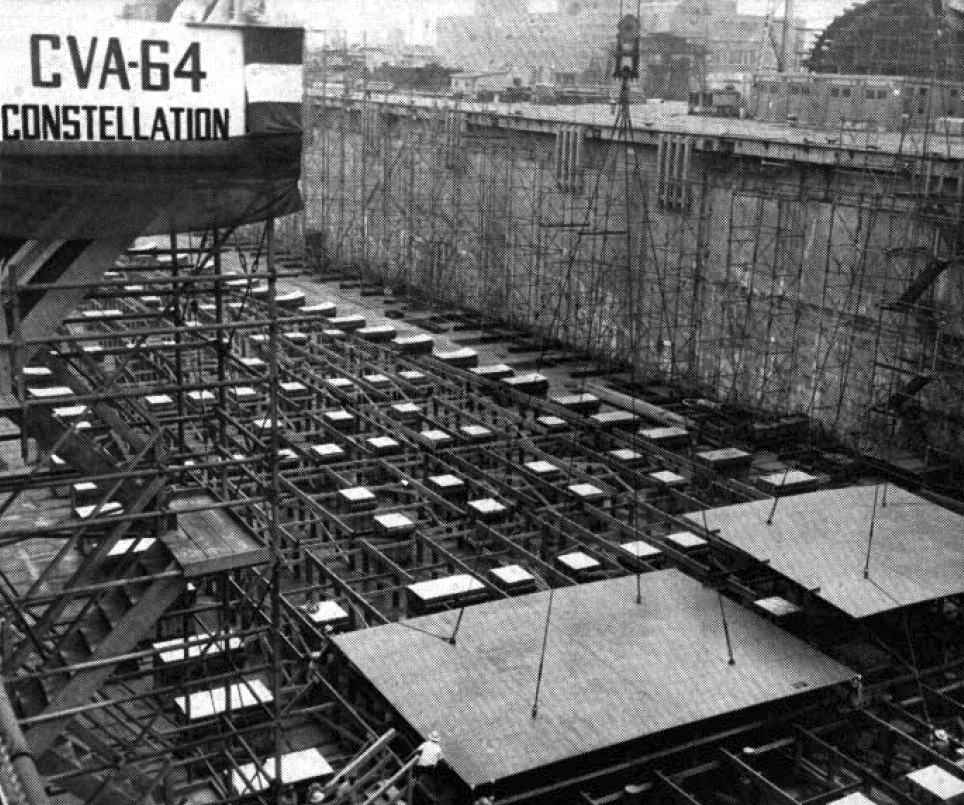
The keel-laying of USS Constellation at New York Naval Shipyard in 1957

When the Korean War started in 1950, the New York Naval Shipyard temporarily became active again, and by 1953, the shipyard had 20,000 workers on its payroll. The yard started retrofitting aircraft carriers to accommodate jet aircraft. For instance, in 1952, the New York Naval Shipyard renovated the World War II-era Antietam into the United States' first angled-deck aircraft carrier. A contract for the construction of Constellation, a super aircraft carrier, was awarded to New York Naval Shipyard in August 1952. The Naval Shipyard was also contracted to build Saratoga and Independence in the late 1950s, as well as six amphibious transports in the 1960s. Despite this increased activity, the New York Naval Shipyard lost about half of its workforce when Korean War hostilities ended in 1953.

The keel of Constellation was laid in 1957. Constellation was nearly complete when she was damaged in a large fire on December 19, 1960, killing 49 people and injuring another 323. This caused her commissioning to be delayed by several months, to October 1961. In addition to the damage suffered from the Constellation fire, the New York Naval Shipyard was gradually becoming technologically obsolete. Newer ships were too large to pass under the nearby Manhattan and Brooklyn Bridges, and so could not get to the yard. The number of workers at New York Naval Shipyard continued to decline, and in 1963, this attracted the attention of U.S. Senator Kenneth B. Keating, who attempted to preserve the 11,000 remaining jobs.

=== Closure ===
In 1963, Department of Defense Secretary Robert S. McNamara started studying the feasibility of closing redundant military installations, especially naval ship yards, in order to save money. The Department of Defense announced in May 1964 that it was considering closing New York Naval Shipyard, as well as Fort Jay and the Brooklyn Army Terminal. Workers protested against the yard's proposed closure in Washington, D.C., as well as in Madison Square Garden. As a result of the shipyard's anticipated closure, new shipbuilding contracts were awarded to private shipbuilders rather than to the New York Naval Shipyard. In October 1964, after lobbying from yard workers and local politicians, the shipyard received several shipbuilding contracts; at the time, the number of employees was 9,100 and decreasing. However, the next month, McNamara announced that the New York Naval Shipyard would be one of nearly a hundred military installations that would be closed.

When the shipyard's closure was announced, it employed 10,600 civilian employees and 100 military personnel with an annual payroll of about $90 million. The closure was anticipated to save about $18.1 million annually. Many of the employees at New York Naval Shipyard were shipbuilders who were specially trained in that practice. Shipbuilders made a last-minute attempt to convince the Navy not to close the yard. Despite these attempts, in January 1965, officials announced that the yard's closure date was scheduled for June 30, 1966, and began laying off the remaining 9,500 workers. By the middle of the year, the New York Naval Shipyard only had 7,000 workers on payroll.

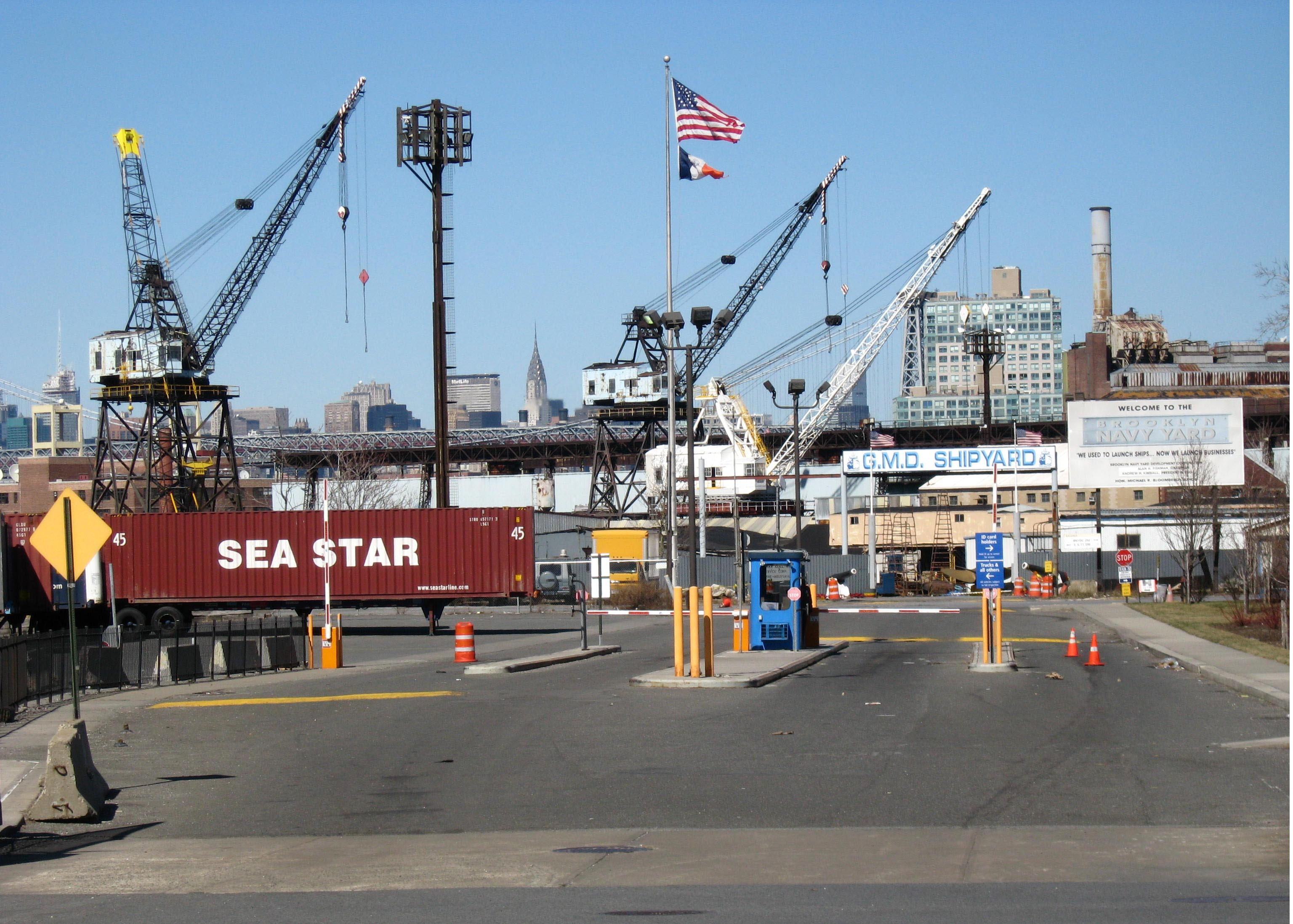
Clinton Avenue gate

After the New York Naval Shipyard's closure was announced, several alternate uses were proposed, none of which were implemented. In early 1965, manufacturers started looking into the possibility of renting space at the yard. Seymour Melman, an engineering economist at the Columbia University's Graduate School of Engineering, devised a detailed plan for converting the Brooklyn Navy Yard into a commercial shipyard which could have saved most of the skilled shipyard jobs. The administration of Mayor Robert F. Wagner Jr. looked to the auto industry to build a car plant inside the yard. Yet another plan called for a federal prison to be built on the site.

In August 1965, the Navy launched its last ship from the New York Naval Shipyard, the Austin-class amphibious transport dock Duluth. The last Navy ships were commissioned at the yard in December 1965. The formal closure of the New York Naval Shipyard was marked by a ceremony on June 25, 1966, and the Navy decommissioned the yard on June 30. Many of the workers subsequently found other work at the Philadelphia Naval Shipyard or other locations.

=== Sale to city, commercial usage, and decline ===
In February 1966, the federal government announced that the Brooklyn Navy Yard was eligible for around $10 million in aid to help convert the yard into an industrial park. The state's bipartisan congressional delegation began negotiations with the federal government to receive this aid. Soon afterward, the city announced plans to purchase the yard and convert it into an industrial complex, despite challenges from several federal agencies who also wanted to use parts of the yard. In July 1966, the city moved to purchase the Brooklyn Navy Yard.

The Johnson administration initially refused to sell the yard to the City of New York. The administration wanted to sell the yard at $55 million, while the city wanted a lower price. In May 1967, the federal government and city agreed on a sale price of $24 million. The Nixon administration, which took office in January 1969, was more amenable to selling the Brooklyn Navy Yard to the city, and offered to sell the yard at more than $1 million below the previously agreed sale price. The next month, ownership of the yard was transferred to the city. Final congressional agreement for the sale was given in November 1969, and the next month, the city received a formal contract to purchase the yard for $22.5 million. The city government made its first down payment for the property in June 1970.

==== First leases ====
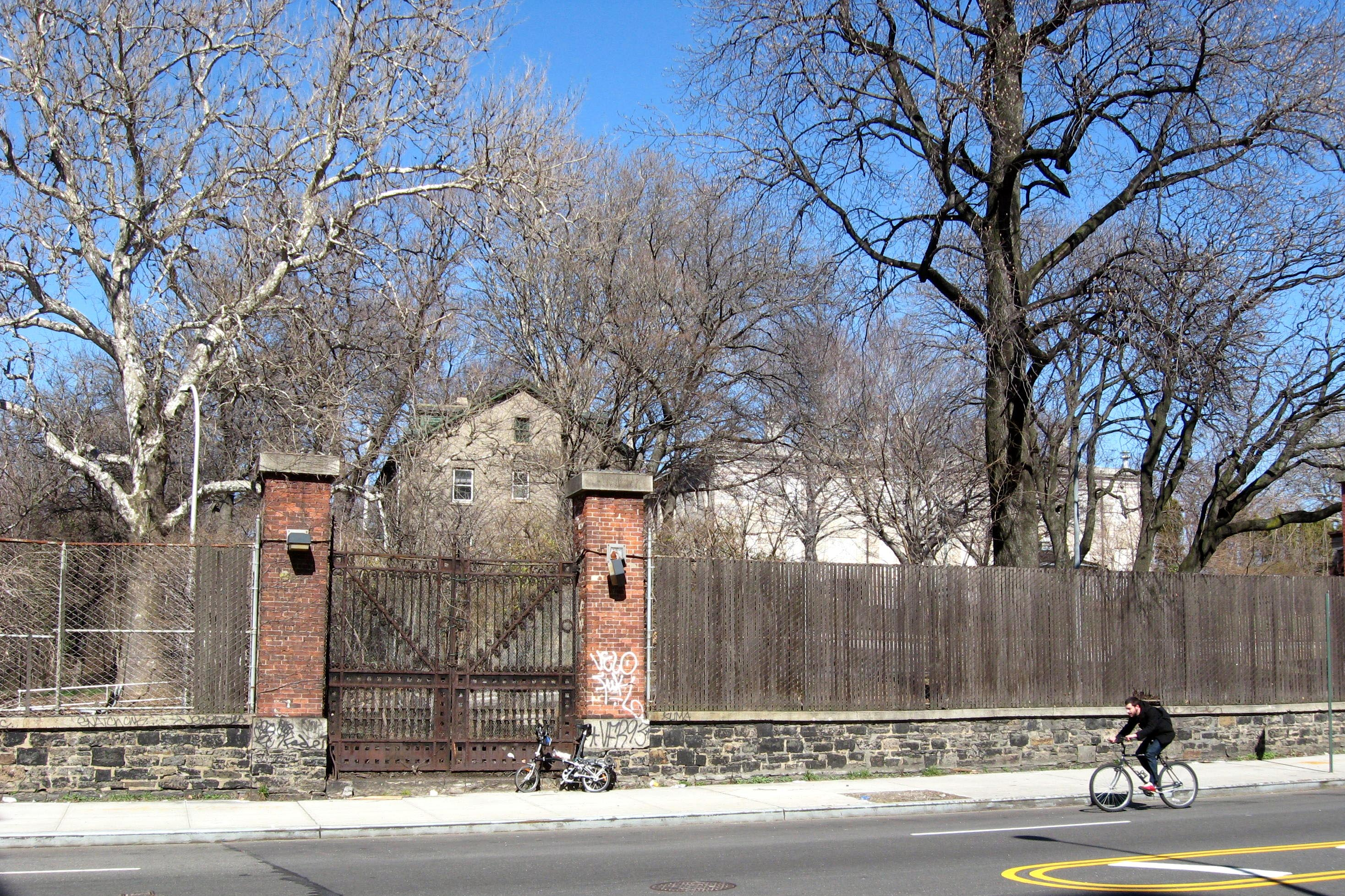
Base housing at Ryerson Avenue gate pictured in 2008

The Commerce Labor Industry Corporation of Kings (CLICK) had been established in 1966 as a nonprofit body to run the yard for the city. CLICK projected that it would create 30,000 to 40,000 jobs at the Brooklyn Navy Yard within ten years, which in turn was expected to revitalize Brooklyn's economy. The first lease inside the yard was signed in May 1968, even before the sale to the city had been finalized. By early 1969, there were 300 people working at four companies within the yard, and more companies were moving in. The yard's tenants operated in a variety of industries, such as manufacturing and distribution.

The city gave CLICK control of the Navy Yard once the city's purchase of the yard had been finalized. However, CLICK and the city soon came to an impasse in which CLICK refused to allow the city to participate in the management of the Navy Yard. There were allegations that CLICK executives favored granting jobs to local residents, rather than helping businesses move into the yard. In 1971, The New York Times reported that CLICK was operating at a net loss, and that CLICK had created less than half of the jobs that were originally promised for the end of 1970. By December 1971, CLICK and the city had a management agreement. CLICK management was completely overhauled with a board of 37 nonpartisan directors who all agreed that CLICK would be a "unified, businesslike organization", rather than a group influenced by politics.

==== Employment peaks ====
Seatrain Shipbuilding, which was wholly owned by Seatrain Lines, was established in 1968 and signed a lease at Brooklyn Navy Yard in 1969. The lease had a provision that Seatrain hire local workers whenever possible, Seatrain became one of the largest tenants at Brooklyn Navy Yard, with 2,700 employees by 1973, most of whom lived in Brooklyn. Seatrain planned to build five very large crude carriers (VLCCs) and seven container ships for Seatrain Lines. It eventually built four VLCCs, which were the largest ships ever to be built in the Brooklyn Navy Yard, as well as eight barges and one ice-breaker barge. Seatrain's first vessel, the turbo tanker Brooklyn, was launched in 1973. Coastal Dry Dock and Repair Corp. leased the three small dry docks and several buildings inside the yard from CLICK in 1972. Coastal Dry Dock only repaired and converted US Navy vessels.

Seatrain temporarily fired 3,000 employees in 1974 due to the 1973 oil crisis, resulting in a steep decline in the number of people employed at the Brooklyn Navy Yard. Soon after, Seatrain began venturing out of the shipbuilding business. The last ship to be built in the Brooklyn Navy Yard was the VLCC Bay Ridge, built by Seatrain; that vessel was renamed Kuito and is operating for Chevron off of the coast of Angola in 400 m (1,300 ft) of water in the Kuito oil field.

Employment inside the yard peaked in 1978. By that point, CLICK was leasing space inside the Brooklyn Navy Yard to 38 tenants, who collectively employed 5,500 tenants and occupied 3.5 million square feet (330,000 m^{2}) of space. The yard had another 550,000 square feet (51,000 m^{2}) of space, but only 6,000 square feet (560 m^{2}) was considered to be usable at the time. Total occupancy at the Brooklyn Navy Yard was at 97%, up from 50% in 1972.

==== Decline ====
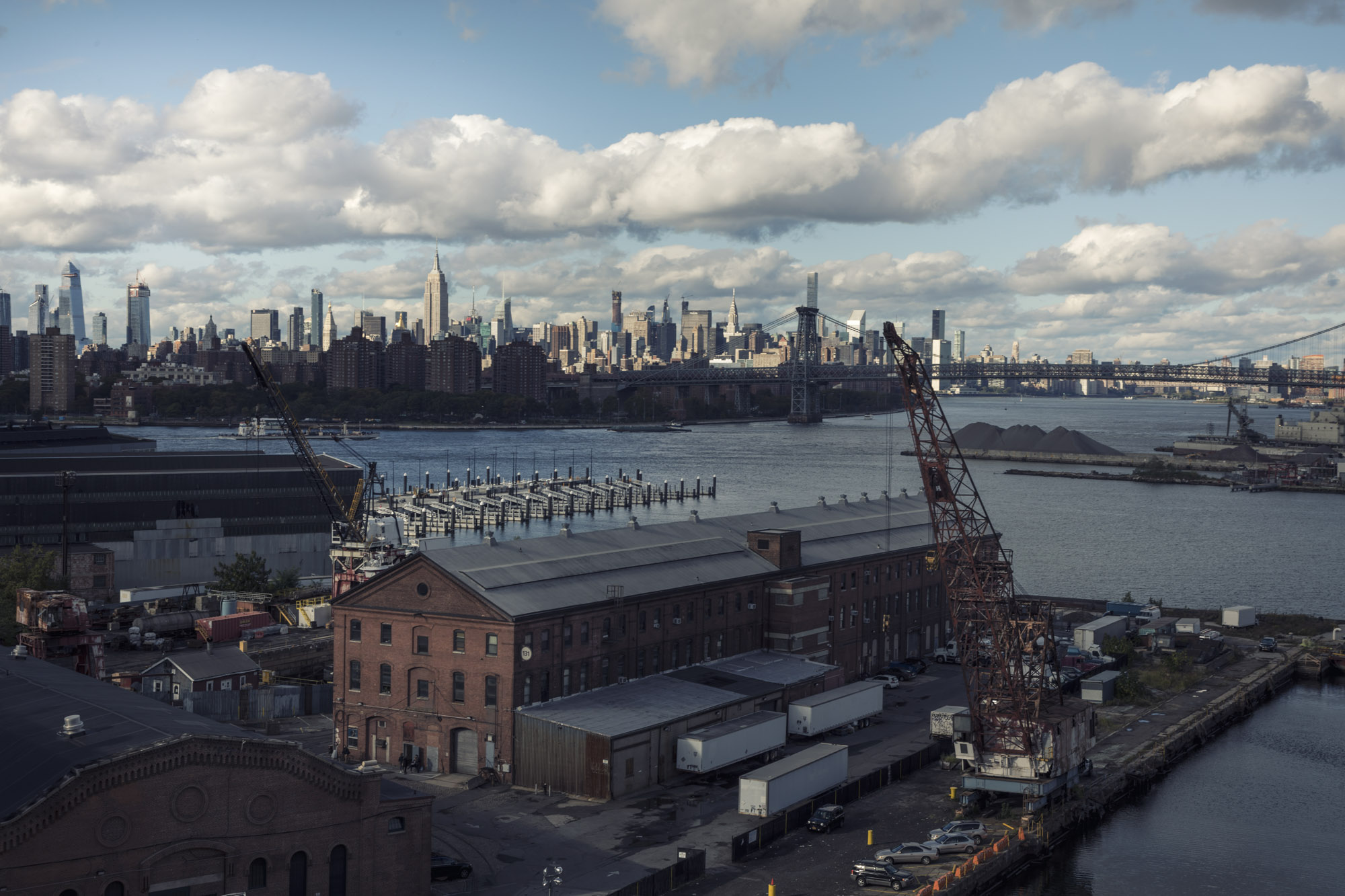
View from near Dry Dock 4

Despite the commercial success of the Brooklyn Navy Yard, the former shipyard was also beset by accusations of corruption and racketeering. Additionally, the introduction of large container ships, which were too big to access the Brooklyn Navy Yard, meant that potential tenants operated in New Jersey instead, which had been investing in container shipping terminals. As a result, most of the 30,000 to 40,000 jobs never materialized.

Seatrain endured a $13.5 million financial loss in 1978 because of various strikes and a decline in demand for oil tankers. In January 1979, Seatrain Lines suddenly closed down. More than 1,300 employees were fired, and only 150 were retained to finish any remaining projects. This caused a sharp decrease in the number of employees at the yard, and after Seatrain's employees had been terminated, the Brooklyn Navy Yard employed 3,970 people. After Seatrain closed down, Coastal Dry Dock became the largest tenant in the yard, with 600 to 1,000 workers at any given time.

The New York City Comptroller, Harrison J. Goldin, published a report on his office's audit of Brooklyn Navy Yard operations in July 1980. He concluded that the yard had been the victim of "a combination of fraud, mismanagement and waste" because of unnecessary or high expenses incurred by CLICK employees. After Goldin's report was published, CLICK's director was forced to resign. In subsequent reports, Goldin found that contracts were poorly managed, and that the city was not getting rent money from the Brooklyn Navy Yard. The number of people working at the yard continued to decline, and by October 1980, the yard hired 2,900 people, of which nearly half worked at Coastal Dry Dock. The most optimistic estimates proposed that the Navy Yard would see 10,000 new jobs added if its redevelopment were to peak. Local residents expressed frustration about the lack of job creation in the Brooklyn Navy Yard, as well as concerns about CLICK's lack of transparency, since residents were prohibited from attending CLICK meetings. In addition, companies at the Navy Yard were accused of having exceedingly high job standards that disqualified most residents from positions at the yard. CLICK was replaced by the nonprofit Brooklyn Navy Yard Development Corporation in 1981.

Coastal Dry Dock filed for bankruptcy in May 1986, and closed the following year. With the loss of Coastal Dry Dock, Brooklyn Navy Yard's revenue decreased by more than half. By 1987, the Brooklyn Navy Yard Development Corporation failed in all attempts to lease any of the six dry docks and buildings to any shipbuilding or ship-repair company. However, the Navy Yard did have 83 tenants and 2,600 employees, who generated a combined $2.7 million per year for the yard. Another ship-repair company, Brooklyn Ship Repair, had a tentative contract to lease space at the Navy Yard, but withdrew in 1988. On the other hand, after a city bailout of the yard in 1986, the Brooklyn Navy Yard Development Corporation started making its first-ever profit.

==== Incinerator plan ====
A garbage incinerator was proposed at Brooklyn Navy Yard as early as 1967. The city proposed that the incinerator double as a cogeneration plant, generating both heat and electricity from the burning of garbage, and supplying that heat and energy to utility company Consolidated Edison. The incinerator would not only reduce the amount of waste being placed in Fresh Kills Landfill on Staten Island and the Fountain Avenue Landfill in eastern Brooklyn, but would also generate electricity for the city. In 1976, Mayor Abraham Beame proposed building a combined incinerator and power plant at Brooklyn Navy Yard. A contract was awarded later that year, at which point it was estimated that the incinerator would cost $226 million to construct. A "temporary" cogeneration plant, which generated steam for the Navy Yard's tenants, opened in late 1982 as a stopgap until a permanent incinerator was built.

The project garnered large community opposition from the Latino and Hasidic Jewish residents of nearby Williamsburg. Mayor Ed Koch withdrew two contract offers in 1982 due to objections from comptroller Goldin, who stated that the health effects of the proposed plant would be detrimental to the community. In December 1984, the New York City Board of Estimate narrowly approved the installation of the proposed incinerator in Brooklyn Navy Yard, one of five sites to be built in the city in the coming years. However, the state refused to grant a permit for constructing the plant for several years, citing that the city had no recycling plan. The proposed incinerator was a key issue in the 1989 mayoral election because the Hasidic Jewish residents of Williamsburg who opposed the incinerator were also politically powerful. David Dinkins, who ultimately won the 1989 mayoral election, campaigned on the stance that the Brooklyn Navy Yard incinerator plan should be put on hold. The state denied a permit for the incinerator in 1989, stating that the city had no plan for reducing ash emissions from the plant.

Once elected, Dinkins took actions that indicated he would not oppose the construction of the incinerator. In 1993, the state reversed its previous decision and granted a permit. By then, Rudy Giuliani had been elected as mayor, and he was opposed to the construction of the incinerator, instead preferring that the city institute a recycling plan. In 1995, his administration delayed the incinerator's construction by three years while the city procured a new solid-waste management plan. In November of that year, community members filed a lawsuit to block the incinerator's construction. Further investigation of the incinerator's proposed site found toxic chemicals were present in such high levels that the site qualified for Superfund environmental cleanup. The next year, the city dropped plans for the construction of the incinerator altogether, instead focusing on expanding its recycling program and closing Fresh Kills Landfill.

=== Industrial redevelopment ===
==== 1990s and 2000s ====
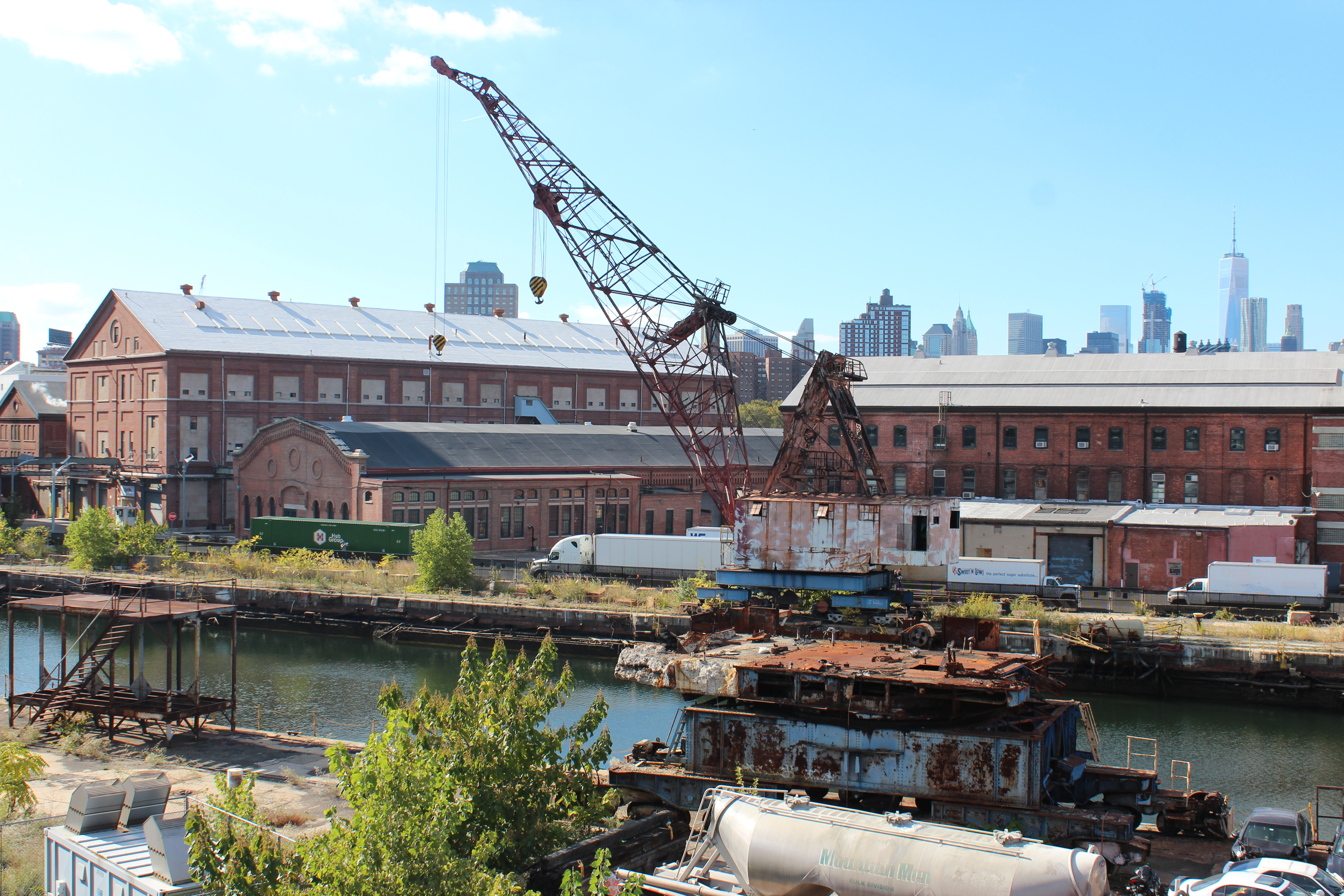
Warehouses next to dry dock

After the decline of shipbuilding at the Brooklyn Navy Yard, it became an area of private manufacturing and commercial activity, though a naval detachment remained at the Brooklyn Navy Yard until 1993. By the early 1990s, there was a large increase in the number of small businesses at the yard due to its proximity to Manhattan, as well as a large availability of space at a relatively low cost. In 1990, twenty-two small businesses signed leases for 88,000 square feet (8,200 m^{2}), and by the next year, the habitable portions of the Brooklyn Navy Yard were 97% leased. The Navy Yard had 180 tenants who hired a combined 3,500 employees by 1991. The redevelopment of the Brooklyn Navy Yard and the Brooklyn Army Terminal spurred ideas for revitalizing Brooklyn's waterfront. Because of community opposition, a medical-waste treatment plant at the Navy Yard was not built.

In 1995, construction started on a new cogeneration plant, the first in the United States to be constructed through the specifications of the federal Clean Air Act. The new cogen facility, located at Building 41, was to replace the temporary facility as well as the existing oil boiler plants at the site. It was completed in 1996 and is operated by ConEdison. Also in 1996, the Brooklyn Navy Yard Development Corporation received $739,000 to study possible uses for the Navy Yard. Community leaders supported the construction of housing on the yard, while they opposed the construction of the proposed trash incinerator. The city started including the Navy Yard within its capital budget in 1997, taking over maintenance of the yard.

In April 1999, actor Robert De Niro and Miramax Films announced that they were studying the possibility of constructing a film studio at Brooklyn Navy Yard. However, the deal with De Niro's group fell through later that year, in part due to a lack of commitment. The city selected a new developer, Douglas C. Steiner, who signed a 70-year lease with the Brooklyn Navy Yard Development Corporation in October 1999. The proposal was initially controversial among the Hasidic Jewish population of the surrounding area, whose leaders objected that the film industry was too immodest for the Hasidic Jewish principles. Ultimately, Steiner Studios was built at a cost of $118 million and opened at the yard in 2004. In 2015, artist Bettina WitteVeen used space at the Navy Yard to mount the fourth installation in her series "When We Were Soldiers … once and young", after trying to get permission from the owners for five years; this was the first time an exhibit had been held at the Navy Yard.

In early 2000, the New York City government launched a program called Digital NYC to convince technology companies to move to seven "technology districts" around the city, including Brooklyn Navy Yard. Initially, this effort was not successful, since no companies signed up to move to Brooklyn Navy Yard at first. In 2004, New York City mayor Michael Bloomberg announced that the city would develop the western side of Brooklyn Navy Yard with 560,000 square feet (52,000 m^{2}) of space for manufacturing, retail, and industrial uses. The development would cost $71 million, to be paid for by investors, while the city would also spend $60 million to upgrade infrastructure in the area. At this time, there was a wall enclosing much of the Navy Yard, but this was going to be partially demolished as part of the upgrade. The former main gate at Sands Street, on the western side of the yard, was to be restored, and the New York City Police Department (NYPD)'s tow pound there would be relocated.

The city broke ground on the expansion in 2006. During renovations, planners consulted some of the 32,000 blueprints in the Navy Yard's archive, some of which dated back two centuries. By 2007, the Navy Yard had over 230 businesses in 40 buildings, with about 5,000 employees between them. At that point, the Bloomberg administration had already spent $30 million on renovations and was proposing to spend an additional $180 million, representing the Navy Yard's largest expansion since World War II. Although the Navy Yard had been 99% occupied for the previous five years, it faced a few setbacks, such as its long distance from the nearest subway stations. Further upgrades to the Brooklyn Navy Yard called for spending $250 million to add 1.3 million square feet (120,000 m^{2}) of retail and manufacturing space as well as 1,500 jobs by 2009. As part of these upgrades, Admiral's Row was to be demolished and replaced with a supermarket and industrial tower, though a controversy developed over whether Admiral's Row should be preserved. There were about 40 preservation projects proposed for the Navy Yard by 2010, and the yard had a full-time archivist.

==== 2010s to present ====
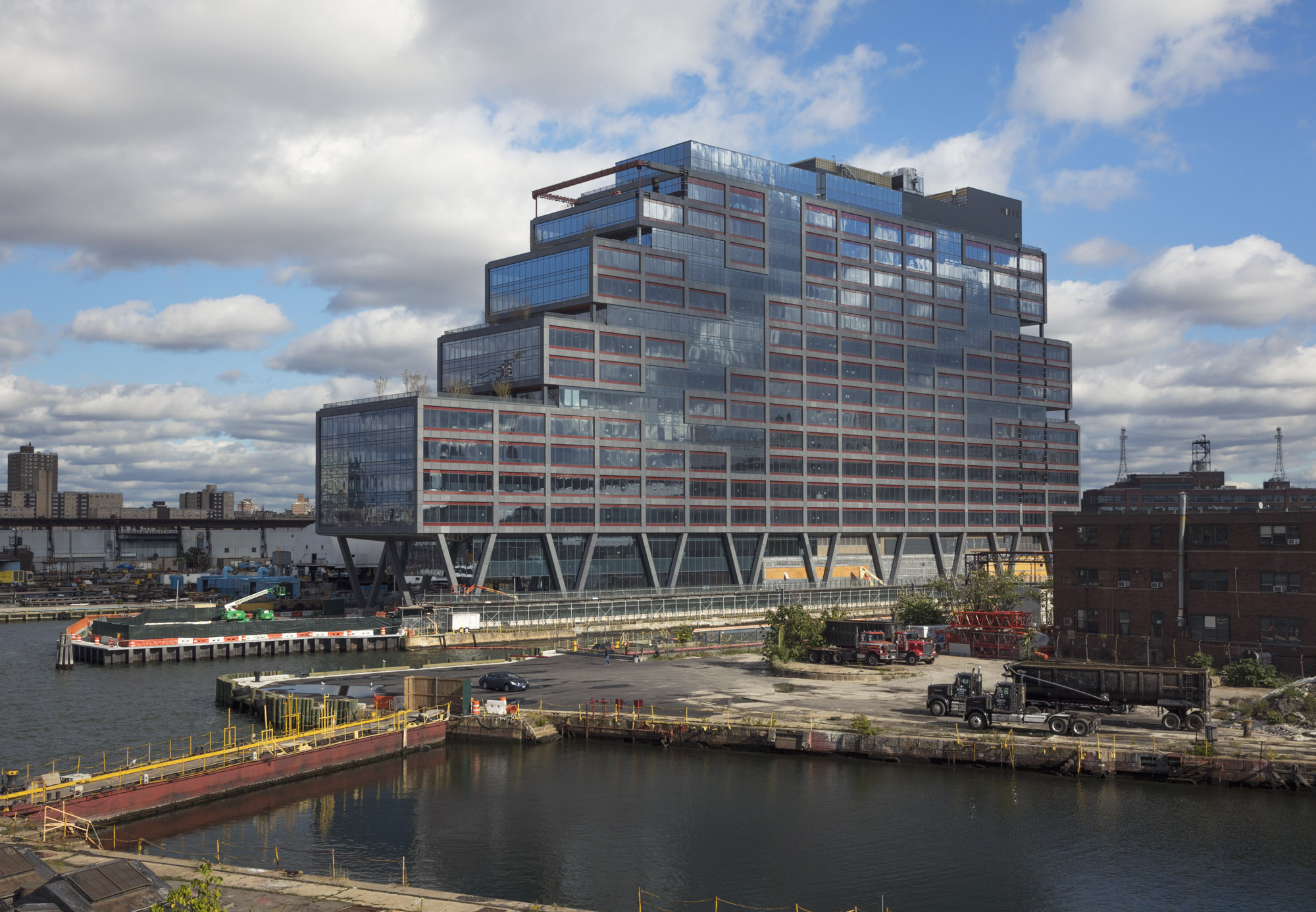
Dock 72 (seen in 2018), located on the northeast corner of Brooklyn Navy Yard, would house WeWork offices when completed

In 2011, the Brooklyn Navy Yard Development Corporation began a large-scale program to develop the Navy Yard. As part of the corporation's long-range plan, it proposed to renovate the Green Manufacturing Center, Building 77, the Admiral's Row site, and the Brooklyn Naval Hospital. That November, the Brooklyn Navy Yard Center at BLDG 92, a museum dedicated to the yard's history and future, opened on Flushing Avenue. By 2015, more than 330 businesses were located at the yard, collectively employing about 7,000 people. Brooklyn Grange Farms was operating a 65,000-square-foot (6,000 m^{2}) commercial farm on top of Building 3. Steiner Studios had become one of the United States' largest production studios outside of Hollywood. Many artists had also leased space and established an association called Brooklyn Navy Yard Arts. Branding agency CO OP Brand Co had been hired to rebrand the area. The redevelopment of Admiral's Row was approved in 2015; as part of the plan, most of Admiral's Row would be demolished and redeveloped.

The 250,000-square-foot Green Manufacturing Center, inside former building 128, was completed in 2016. Dock 72, a 675,000-square-foot office building, topped out in October 2017 and houses offices for WeWork, a co-working space. A renovation of the 1 million square feet (93,000 m^{2}), 18-story Building 77 was undertaken at a cost of $143 million, and the building was reopened in November 2017. Construction on 399 Sands Street, a manufacturing complex on the site of Admiral's Row, started in June 2018 and was completed in 2020. An adjacent Wegmans supermarket opened in 2019, along with part of 399 Sands' parking lot. The Admiral's Row redevelopment would include 360,000 square feet (33,000 m^{2}) of light industrial and office space and 165,000 square feet (15,300 m^{2}) of retail space.

In January 2018, the Brooklyn Navy Yard Development Corporation released an updated master plan with an estimated cost of $2.5 billion. An additional 5.1 million square feet (470,000 m^{2}) of space would be added at Brooklyn Navy Yard; most of this would be manufacturing space, but a small portion of the space in each new building would be dedicated to office uses. This space, to be built as part of a new technology hub, would be able to accommodate 13,000 extra workers, and would roughly double the amount of manufacturing and office space within the Navy Yard. In fall 2018, the Brooklyn Navy Yard Development Corporation and architectural firm WXY divulged further details about the master plan. The Brooklyn Navy Yard would include several vertical-manufacturing buildings, and various locations within the Navy Yard would be redeveloped to integrate it with the surrounding community. The development would be concentrated at three sites on Navy Street and Flushing and Kent Avenues. That December, the development corporation started soliciting applications to renovate the last undeveloped pier at the Brooklyn Navy Yard.

Pratt Institute established the first phase of the Research Yard in 2023 within Building 3 of the Brooklyn Navy Yard. Subsequently, the Brooklyn Navy Yard Development Corporation issued a request for proposals for the second phase of the Research Yard in 2025. The same year, the Navy Yard received $28.7 million from the Federal Emergency Management Agency to repair damage caused by Hurricane Sandy more than a decade prior. Plans for a material lab at Building 20 were announced in 2026.

== Description ==
The Brooklyn Navy Yard has five piers labeled C, D, G, J, and K from west to east, with ten berths in total. The piers range from 350 to 890 feet (110 to 270 m) long, contain a 10-foot (3.0 m) deck height, and have 25 to 40 feet (7.6 to 12.2 m) of depth alongside. At its peak during World War II, the Brooklyn Navy Yard had nine piers and 16,495 feet (5,028 m) of berthing space. Adjacent to the piers is a homeport for the NYC Ferry system.

The Navy Yard also contains six dry docks, numbered 1, 4, 2, 3, 5, and 6 from west to east. The drydocks are now operated by GMD Shipyard Corp. Since at least the 1920s, a federal project maintains a channel depth of 35 ft (10 m) from Throggs Neck to the yard, about two miles (3 km) from the western entrance, and thence 40 ft (12 m) to deep water in the Upper Bay. As indicated in a 1917 report, the channel's depth was previously maintained at 40 feet from Throggs Neck to Upper New York Bay, with a channel width varying from 550 to 1,000 feet (170 to 300 m) from Throggs Neck to Brooklyn Navy Yard, and thence 1,000 feet to deep water in the Upper Bay.

Geographically, the Brooklyn Navy Yard is located at the western end of Long Island. It surrounds Wallabout Bay, a former tidal marsh on the southeastern shore of the East River, a tidal estuary that connects to Long Island Sound on the east and the New York Bay to the south. The bay, in turn, is located at a bend of the river just south of the Williamsburg Bridge, where the river turns from a southward alignment to a westward alignment. The surrounding area is located near the northeast tip of the Atlantic coastal plain, a flat, low-lying physiographic region that extends to the southern United States. The area was formerly fed by Wallabout Creek, which flowed downhill from the hilly terminal moraine in the center of Long Island and drained into a low, small area before reaching Wallabout Bay. This resulted in the mud flats that formerly were prevalent in Brooklyn Navy Yard, though the shipyard site straddles the geographical boundary between mud flats and tidal marshland.

The Brooklyn Navy Yard's streets are not shown on any official city maps, as all of its roads are privately maintained. The address for the entire Navy Yard is given as 63 Flushing Avenue. The Brooklyn Navy Yard can be accessed via gates at Sands/Navy Streets, Cumberland Street/Flushing Avenue, Clinton/Flushing Avenues, and Kent Avenue/Clymer Street. A brick wall used to encircle the Navy Yard, separating it from the Farragut Houses and Vinegar Hill to the west; Fort Greene to the south; and Williamsburg to the east.

=== Transportation ===
Transportation to Brooklyn Navy Yard is provided by the MTA's B67 bus, which makes stops inside the yard. The B57, B62 and B69 buses stop along the yard's perimeter. The nearest New York City Subway station is at York Street, served by the F and <F> trains. A self-driving shuttle van service operating exclusively within the area starting in 2019 but later ceased operations.

A NYC Ferry stop was initially planned to open in Brooklyn Navy Yard in 2018. A stop along NYC Ferry's Astoria route at Dock 72 was included in a NYC Ferry expansion announced in January 2019, and the NYC Ferry stop ultimately opened as scheduled on May 20, 2019. The Brooklyn Navy Yard also houses NYC Ferry's homeport, where the system's fleet is maintained.

==== Shuttle bus service ====
Since 2016, the Brooklyn Navy Yard Development Corporation has operated two complimentary shuttle bus services for Navy Yard tenants and their guests. One route runs to the York Street station and the High Street station on the A and C trains. The other route to the Atlantic Avenue–Barclays Center station on the 2, 3, 4, 5, B, D, N, Q, and R trains; Atlantic Terminal on the Long Island Rail Road; and the Clinton–Washington Avenues station on the G train. The services utilize 30-foot Grande West Vicinity and Freightliner cutaways.

== Notable structures ==
Map of notable buildings and structures at Brooklyn Navy Yard: (1) Brooklyn Naval Hospital; (2) Steiner Studios; (3) Building 77; (4) supply storehouse/Building 3; (5) Navy Yard Museum/Building 92; (6) Admiral's Row redevelopment; (7) Commandant's House

=== Brooklyn Naval Hospital ===
The Brooklyn Naval Hospital was established in 1825 on a site that was not initially contiguous with the main Navy Yard. A main building was completed in 1838, and was subsequently expanded with several wings, including two permanent wings built in 1840 that still exist. A two-story Surgeon's House was built in 1863. More structures were added in the early 20th century, including a medical supply depot, a lumber shed, and quarters buildings. The hospital also operated a cemetery from 1831 to 1910, when the cemetery reached its burial capacity. In 1948, the hospital was decommissioned and most of its functions were relocated to other facilities.

In 2012, Steiner Studios proposed to build a media campus at the former hospital site as an annex to its existing campus at the Navy Yard. A park on the hospital cemetery's site, the Greenway Botanical Garden, was opened in May 2016. At the time, Steiner Studios was planning to restore the hospital buildings starting in 2017, and restoration was expected to take nearly a decade. Designed by Nelson Byrd Woltz Landscape Architects, the public park received an award for its accessible wooden boardwalk that "seems to hover... across an undulating, grassy plane of pollinator habitat to a cherry grove." The park includes 1.8 acres of climate-resilient native meadow.

=== Brooklyn Navy Yard Center (Building 92) ===
The original Building 92, built in 1857 and designed by Thomas Ustick Walter, is the former U.S. Marine Commandant's quarters. The house has a floor area of 9,500-square-foot (880 m^{2}) and is three stories high with a brick facade, a hip roof, and three window bays on each side. Building 92 is the only remnant of the 3.5-acre (1.4 ha) U.S. Marine Barrack Grounds along Flushing Avenue. The grounds was built on land acquired in 1848 and included marine officers' quarters, a barracks (former Building 91), a gate house, and a central parade ground. All of these buildings were constructed in the Greek Revival style. Building 92 used to have a nearly identical counterpart, Building 93, which was demolished in 1941 to make way for a warehouse.

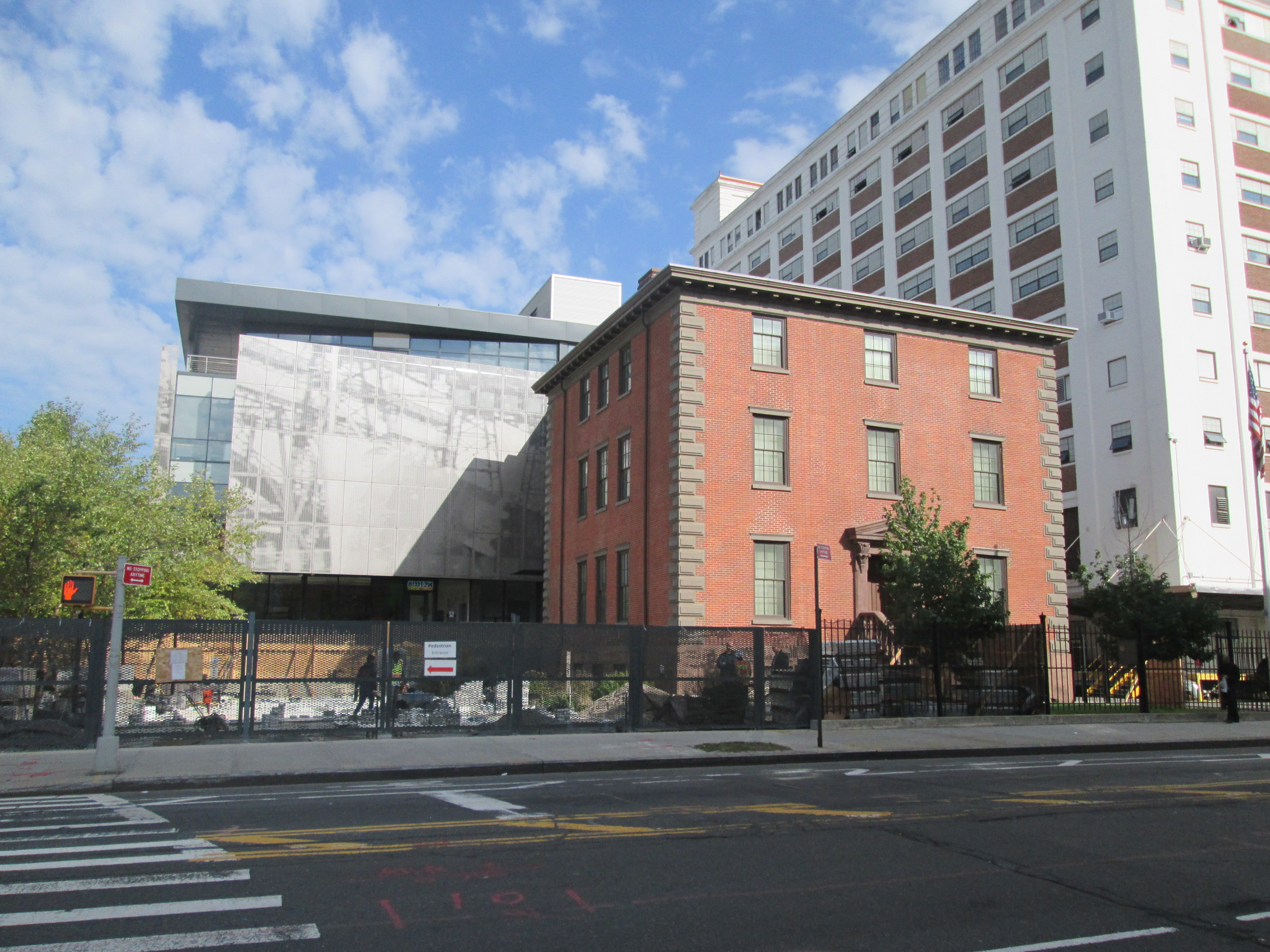
Building 92 museum. The original 1857 structure is the red brick building located at right, and the 2011 annex is the metal annex located behind it and at left.

The former U.S. Marine Commandant's residence is now part of a museum dedicated to the shipyard, the Brooklyn Navy Yard Center at Building 92. Building 92 was renovated and expanded by Beyer Blinder Belle in 2011 at a cost of $25 million. The Brooklyn Navy Yard Center opened in November 2011 as a program of the Brooklyn Navy Yard Development Corporation. The center offers exhibits, public tours, educational programs, archival resources, and workforce development services. The museum's main exhibit focuses on the history of the Brooklyn Navy Yard and its impact on American industry, technology, innovation, and manufacturing, as well as on national and New York City's labor, politics, education, and urban and environmental planning. The building also hosts displays and videos about the new businesses in the facility. Plans for a museum dedicated to the Brooklyn Navy Yard date to 1975, though the museum was originally proposed to be located in a different building.

The center contains a 24,500-square-foot (2,280 m^{2}) annex with a laser-cut metal facade. The annex is connected to the original house via a 3-story lobby. The lobby includes a 22,500-pound (10,200 kg) steel anchor from the amphibious assault ship Austin (1964).

=== Dry docks ===
The Brooklyn Navy Yard consists of six dry docks located along the Brooklyn Navy Yard's northern edge, along the East River. Dry Dock 1 was the first one to be completed. This was followed by Dry Dock 2 in 1887, Dry Dock 3 in 1897, Dry Dock 4 in 1913, and Dry Docks 5 and 6 in 1941. Dry Docks 1, 5, and 6 are the only dry docks that remain in service.

Dock No.	Material of which dock is constructed	Length	Width	Depth	Date Completed	Source
1	Granite	318 feet 1 inch (96.95 m)	98 feet 1 inch (29.90 m)	25 feet 6 inches (7.77 m)	1851	
2	Concrete	459 feet 1 inch (139.93 m)	112 feet (34 m)	24 feet 1 inch (7.34 m)	1901	
3	Wood and Concrete	612 feet 11 inches (186.82 m)	150 feet 10 inches (45.97 m)	29 feet 8 inches (9.04 m)	1897	
4	Concrete & brick, granite skills & coping	723 feet 3 inches (220.45 m)	139 feet 6 inches (42.52 m)	35 feet 5 inches (10.80 m)	1913	
5	Reinforced concrete	1,092 feet (333 m)	150 feet (46 m)	41 feet (12 m)	1943	
6	Reinforced concrete	1,092 feet (333 m)	150 feet (46 m)	41 feet (12 m)	1943	

==== Dry Dock 1 ====
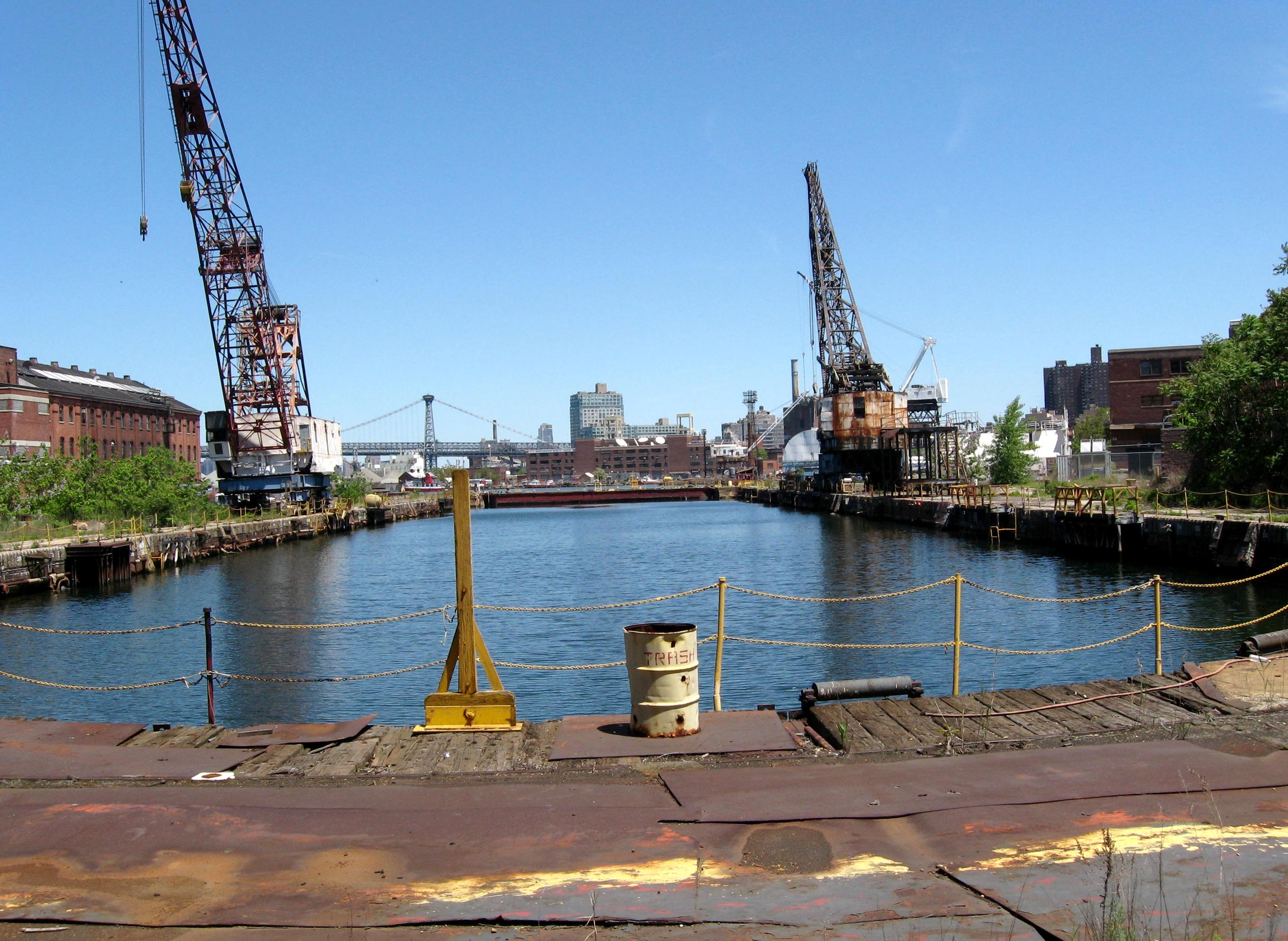
Dry Dock 4 in "flooded" state

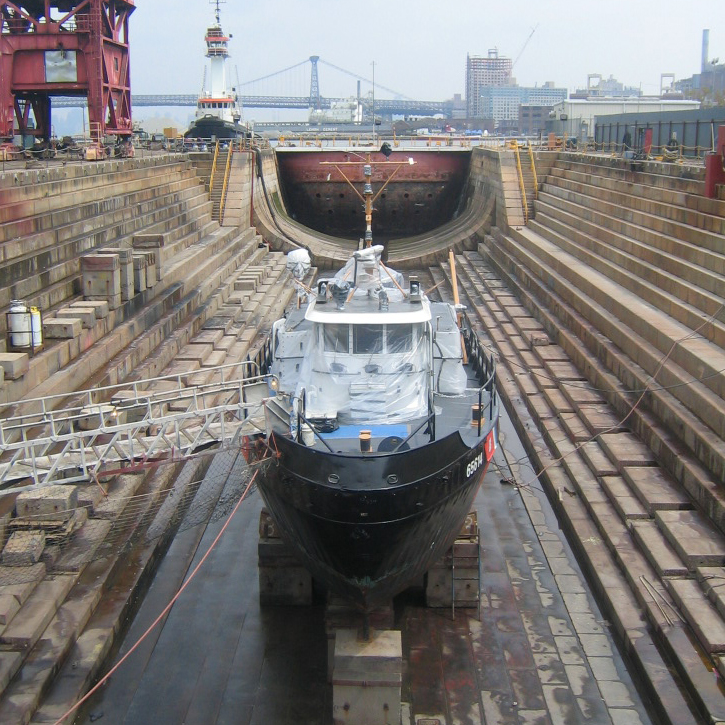
Dry Dock 1 in "dry" state

Dry Dock 1 is located at Wallabout Bay, on the northeast side of Brooklyn Navy Yard. Completed in 1851, it is the third-oldest dry dock in the United States, behind the dry docks at the Boston and Norfolk Navy Yards. Dry Dock 1 is the smallest of the Navy Yard's dry docks. The first permanent dry dock in New York City, it cost $2 million (equivalent to $62,419,000 in 2025) to construct. Over the years, Dry Dock 1 has serviced boats such as Monitor, which fought in the Battle of Hampton Roads during the Civil War, and Niagara, which laid the first transatlantic cable.

Dry Dock 1's masonry superstructure uses 23,000 cubic yards (18,000 m^{3}) of granite from Maine and Connecticut, as well as supplementary material from New York. The stone floor of the dry dock is 30 feet (9.1 m) wide, and the floor curves in an inverted arch shape toward the edges of the sides and the landward (southwest) end. The center of the floor is mostly flat, with a 1-foot (0.30 m) groove. Steps lead down the sides of the dry dock. At the seaward end of the dock is a gate that floats open without the use of hinges. A Harper's Magazine article from 1871 stated that Dry Dock 1 had a capacity of 610,000 US gallons (2,300,000 L) and could be emptied within two hours and ten minutes. The dry dock was 66 feet (20 m) wide and 36 feet (11 m) deep, and when the dock was filled at high tide, the depth of the water was 26 feet (7.9 m). The Brooklyn Daily Eagle in 1918 described the main chamber of the dry dock as being 286 feet (87 m) long by 35 feet (11 m) wide on the bottom, and the top part as being 370 feet (110 m) long by 98 feet (30 m) wide. The pumping engine built for this drydock was the largest in the U.S. at one time.

Surveying for the dry dock began in 1826, though funding was not provided until 1836. Construction on the dry dock started in 1841, but was halted a year later because of a lack of funding. During this time, there were debates over whether to abandon work on this dry dock and construct another in Manhattan, where the new Croton Aqueduct had just opened. When construction resumed in 1844, the project was led by two civil engineers in quick succession until William J. McAlpine was appointed to the position in 1846. At the time, the project was beset by several problems, including the presence of quicksand and underground springs, as well as a faulty cofferdam design that twice flooded the excavation site with water from Wallabout Bay. The cofferdam was fixed by installing deep foundations made of gravel at the outermost cofferdam. The springs were covered with a mixture of piles, planks and dry cement under a layer of brick and Roman mortar. The quicksand was 75 feet (23 m) deep, so workers sunk more than 6,500 wooden piles into the bay (the first use of a steam pile driver in the United States' history), and filled the spaces around the piles with concrete. In 1847 after the wooden piles were completed, the stonecutter Thorton MacNess Niven oversaw the installation of the dry dock's masonry superstructure.

McAlpine was fired for unknown reasons in 1849, and Charles B. Stuart took over for the rest of the project. Dry Dock 1 serviced its first ship, Dale, in 1850. The dry dock was completed the following year. Because of its design, Dry Dock 1 never required any extensive maintenance, though part of the masonry at the front of the dry dock was refurbished in 1887–1888. Dry Dock 1 was labeled a NYC Landmark in 1975.

=== Timber shed ===
The Brooklyn Navy Yard's timber shed (Building 16), constructed between 1833 and 1853, is one of the Brooklyn Navy Yard's oldest buildings, behind the 1806 commandant's house and the 1838 Naval Hospital building. It is a brick building with a gable roof located on the west side of the Brooklyn Navy Yard, adjoining Navy Street. The timber shed had a twin, Building 15, which was located directly to the north and is now demolished. Building 16 originally measured 60 by 300 feet (18 by 91 m) while Building 15 measured 60 by 400 feet (18 by 122 m). Both buildings were used to store wood for shipbuilding after it had been cured in the nearby mill pond. Documents from 1837 suggest that the United States Navy allocated almost $90,000 (equivalent to $2,561,000 in 2025) on the construction of up to four brick timber sheds at Brooklyn Navy Yard.

After the Civil War, the timber sheds were used for timber storage, though the number of wooden ships built at the Navy Yard steadily decreased. During the late 19th century, Admiral's Row, a grouping of residences that formerly housed Navy Yard officers, was built around the timber sheds. As part of a Works Progress Administration renovation, part of Building 15 was demolished in 1937. In the 1940s, Building 16 was used as a police station as well as a lumber storage building, and in the 1950s and 1960s, it was also used as a garage. A 1963 renovation to Building 16 demolished part of the building, and the remainder was converted into a private ice rink for police officers. The rest of Building 15 was demolished probably after 1979, and Building 16 was abandoned around this time.

By 2010, Building 16 had been proposed for redevelopment, although it had badly deteriorated. In early 2011, engineers for the National Guard Bureau recommended demolishing the structure, since refurbishing it would cost $40 million. The refurbishment of the timber shed was underway by 2018. Douglas C. Steiner, who was redeveloping the Admiral's Row site, stated in January 2018 that Building 16 would likely be developed for food-related uses, such as for a restaurant.

=== Sands Street gate ===
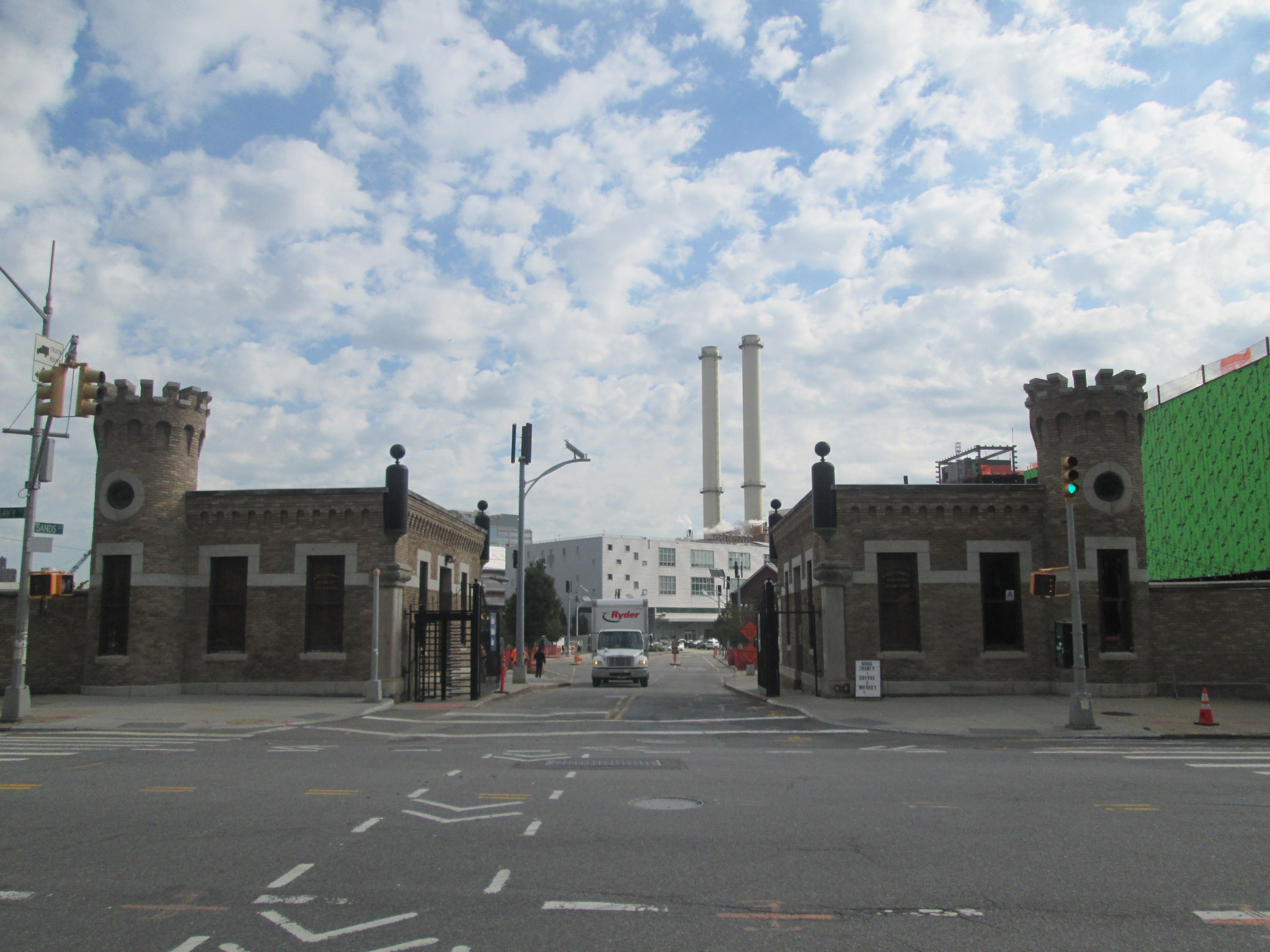
Sands Street gate

The gate at Sands Street, on the Brooklyn Navy Yard's western border, was the main entrance to the yard in the early 20th century. It consists of a one-story medieval-style gatehouse shaped like a castle, with plinths, turrets, and posts with eagles on the tops. This entrance is located at the intersection of Sands Street and Navy Street, close to Admiral's Row, and was surrounded by the two timber sheds there. A wooden footbridge above the gate, built after World War II, formerly connected the two sheds. The gatehouse has undergone modifications throughout the years, including the addition of second and third floors (since removed), and the removal of the turrets. At one point, the Sands Street gate featured a failed hand-cranked submarine design called the Intelligent Whale, as well as Trophy Park, which contained a memorial shaft to twelve American sailors killed during the Battle of Canton in 1856.

The Sands Street gate replaced another gate on nearby York Street, and it cost $20,000 or $24,000 to build. As originally proposed in 1893, the gatehouse was supposed to be a 4-story structure containing a peaked roof, crenelations, and an ornate facade. However, the gatehouse was downsized to its current design because the other proposal was too expensive. Fearing a loss of business, saloon keepers on York Street protested against the Sands Street gate's construction, to no avail.

The gate started construction in 1895, and it opened a year later. The new Sands Street gate was not only closer to the trolley lines on Flushing Avenue, but also avoided a dirty and "malodorous" vicinity around the York Street gate. A year after the gate's opening, the Brooklyn Daily Eagle noted that the vicinity of the Sands Street gate was "much appreciated by the young women of Brooklyn who are enthusiastic Navy Yard visitors." Saloons soon opened up around this gate, and by 1924, sailors were banned from using the entrance. Starting with the Spanish–American War and continuing through both major world wars, potential Navy applicants lined up outside the Sands Street gate to enlist in the Navy. Sometime after the Navy Yard was decommissioned, the Sands Street gate became the entrance to the NYPD's Brooklyn tow pound, and by 2004, there were plans to refurbish the gate. The gatehouse was restored to its original condition in 2012, and it has housed the Kings County Distillery's tasting room since 2015.

=== Supply storehouse ===
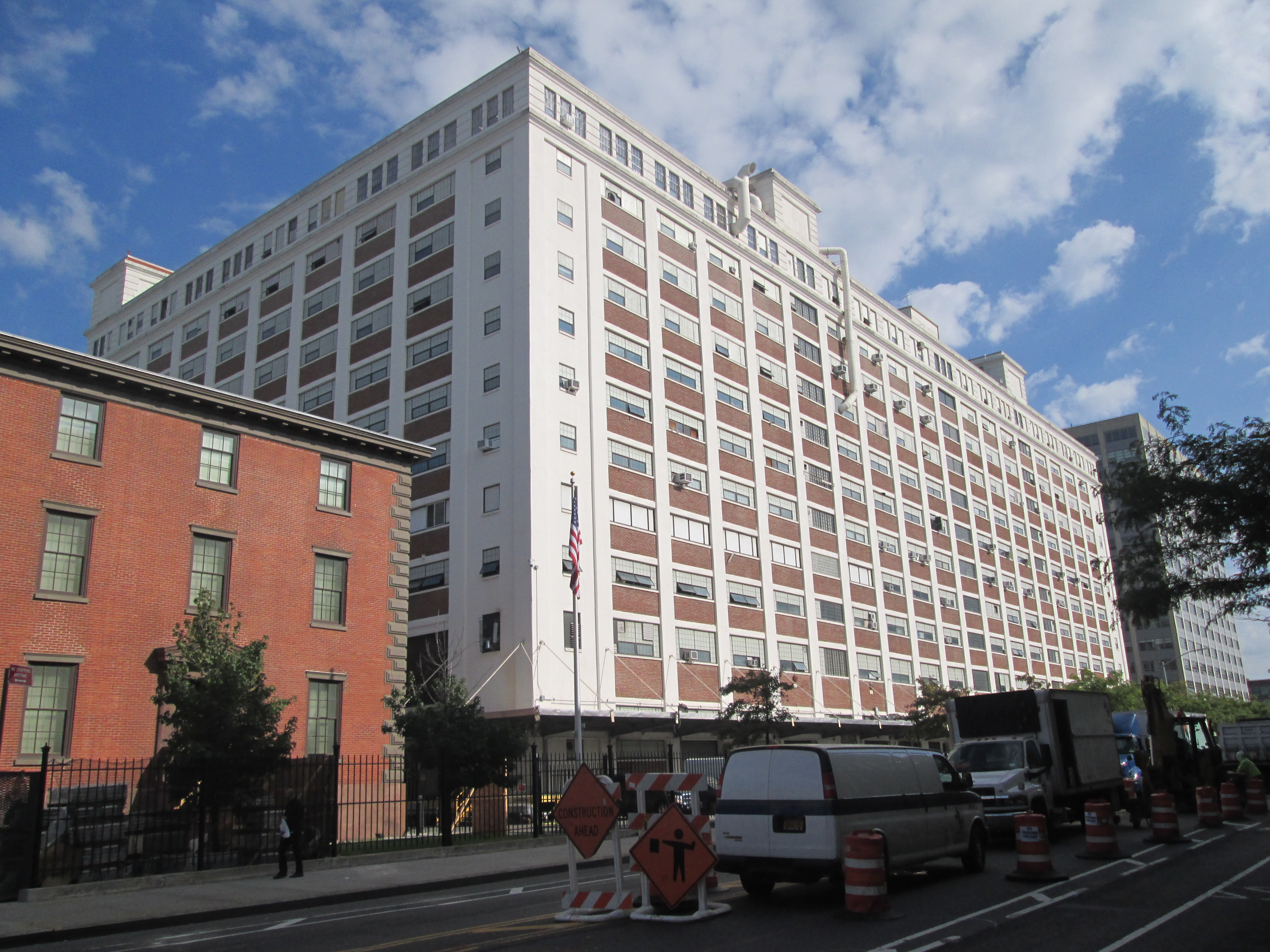
The supply storehouse, located immediately east of Building 92, looking eastward

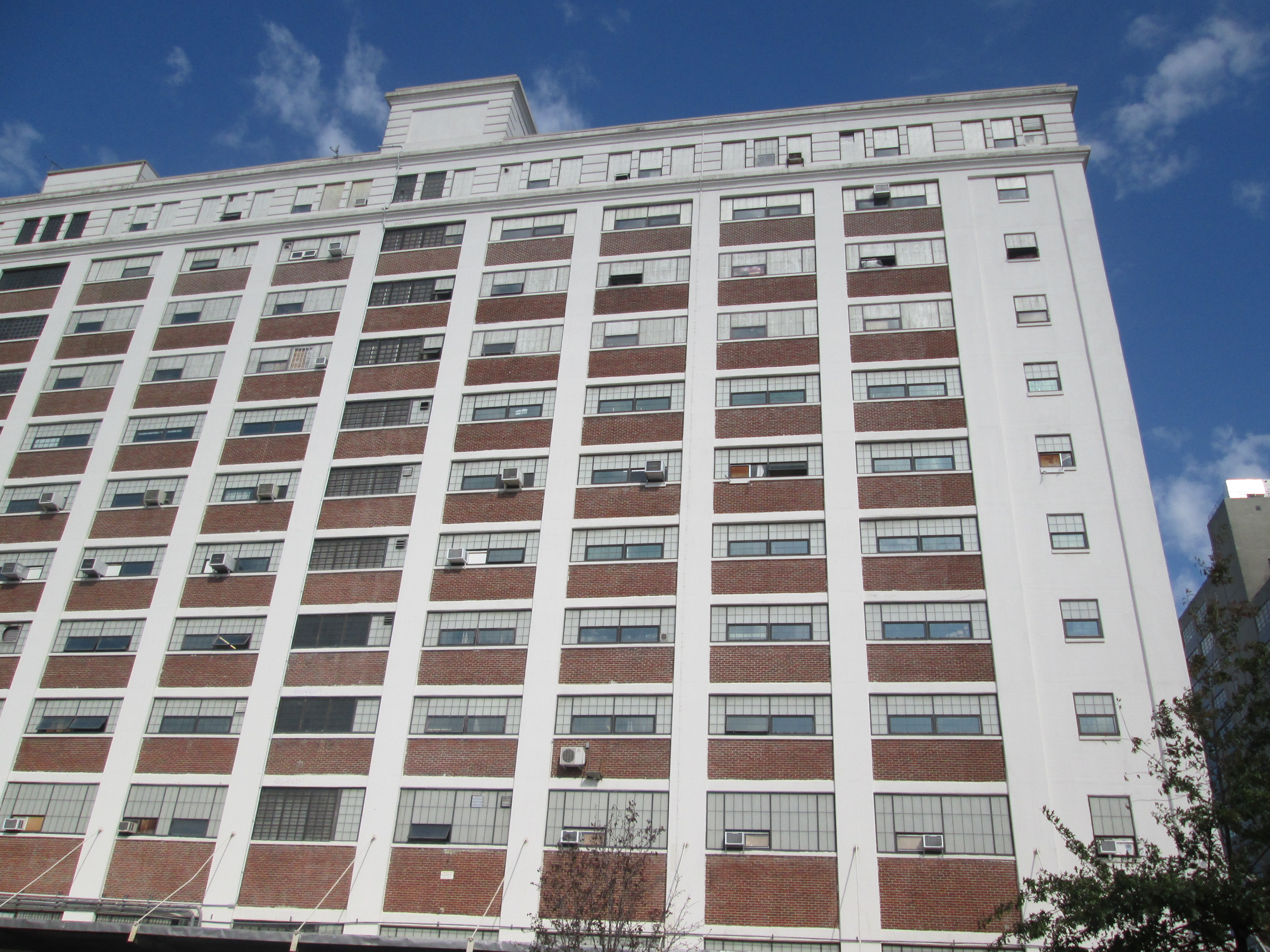
Close-up of the facade of the supply storehouse

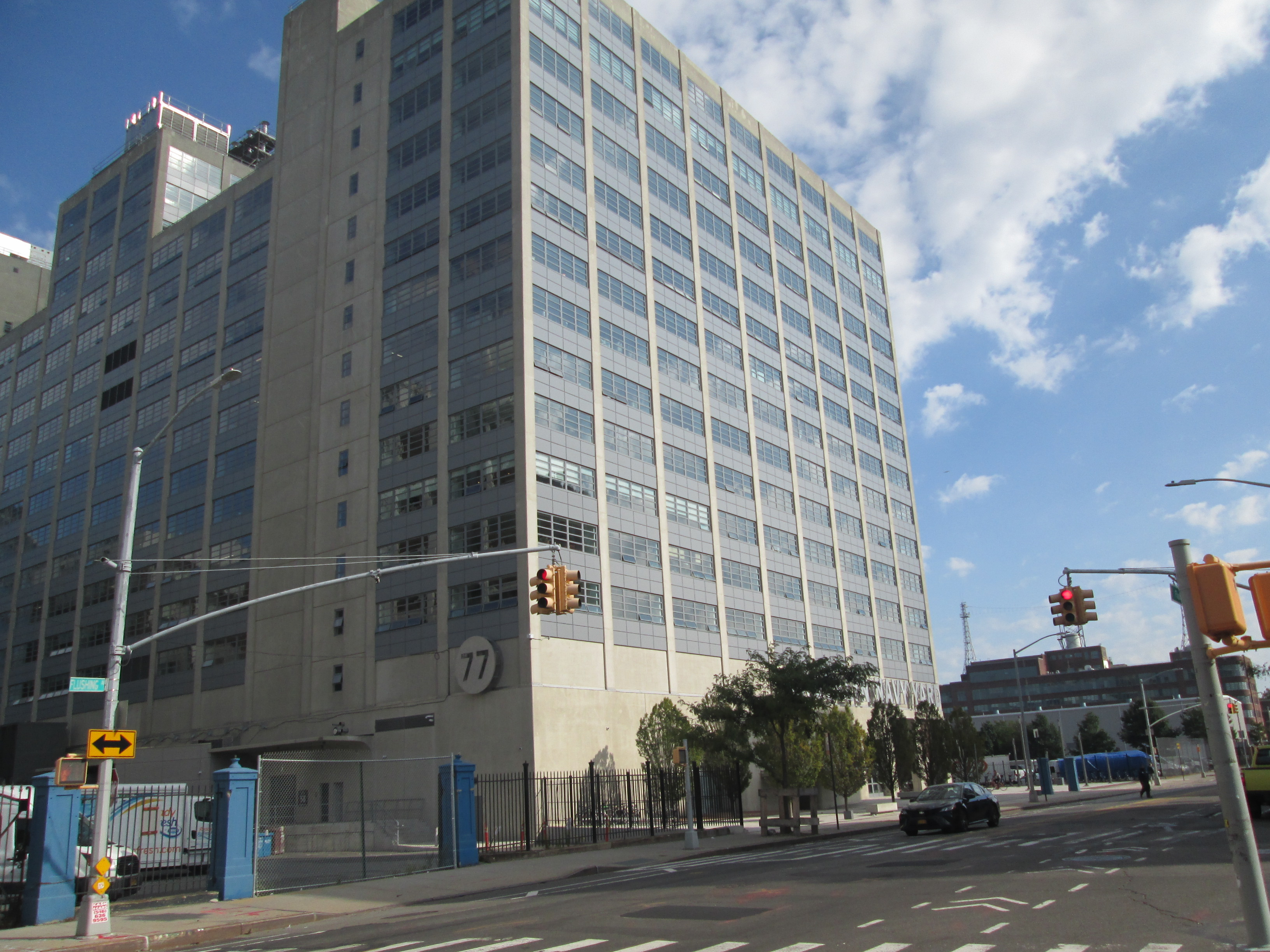
Building 77, located immediately east of the supply storehouse, looking eastward

The Brooklyn Navy Yard's eleven-story supply storehouse (Building 3), located east of Building 92, was the first reinforced-concrete building constructed at the yard. Built by Turner Construction in the Neo-Classical style, it contains a one-story base and one-story attic with nine stories in between. A loading platform, covered by a flat metal canopy, encircles the building's base, and contains loading dock entries at various points. There were also formerly rail sidings on the west and north sides of the building. The nine stories above the base contain columns of wide rectangular windows, organized into "bays". Each bay is separated by concrete piers, and each window contains a concrete still below it. There are cornices at the top of the tenth and eleventh floors. On the eleventh floor, each bay contains triple-windows, and there are stair and elevator bulkhead structures, as well as skylights. The structure contained 712,000 square feet (66,100 m^{2}) of floor space when first built.

The federal government had commissioned Turner Construction by chance, when government officials raided Turner's factory based on a report of German guns being manufactured, and found Turner manufacturing engine foundations instead. A contract for Building 3's construction was made in April 1917. Work began four days after the contract was signed. The modification to 11 stories was made partway through the construction progress. Construction progressed at a pace of one story per week, aided by the proximity of the Navy Yard's railroad system, via which materials could be delivered. The structure was finished by September at a cost of $1.2 million, and the Navy moved into the structure on October 1, 1917. The attic contained the commandant's, yard captain's, and manager's offices. Building 3 was outfitted with radio and radar laboratories during World War II, and footbridges were constructed to Buildings 5 and 77, although both footbridges have since been demolished. The roof of Building 3 now contains a rooftop farm run by Brooklyn Grange, and the rest of the building is occupied by various industrial and commercial tenants.

=== Building 77 ===
Building 77 is a sixteen-story structure constructed during World War II based on a design by George T. Basset. The structure contains 952,000 square feet (88,400 m^{2}) of floor space. The foundation of the building is supported by caissons of concrete and steel, which descend 150 feet (46 m) underground. The lowest eleven stories were constructed with 25-inch-thick (64 cm) walls and no windows, encompassing 21 acres (85,000 m^{2}) of storage space. These floors were likely used to store ammunition. Windows were installed on these floors in a 2017 renovation of the building.

In mid-1940, Turner Construction was hired to erect the building under a cost-plus-fixed-fee contract, which would expedite construction. The foundation of the building was constructed in June 1941, and construction progressed quickly, with one story completed roughly every three working days. The structure was completed by September 1941 at a cost of $4 million. The structure originally contained the yard headquarters as well as other spaces such as offices, storage spaces, laboratories, and a library. Building 77 was renovated in 2017 by Beyer Blinder Belle and now houses light manufacturing as well as commercial tenants.

=== Other notable structures ===
- The commandant's house, Quarters A (built 1807), is a federal style structure in Vinegar Hill that is a part of Admiral's Row. Charles Bulfinch, who also designed the United States Capitol's rotunda, is often named as the architect of this house, though there is no evidence that Bulfinch was actually involved in the design.
- Building 1 (former Building 291, built c. 1941–1942) was a materials testing laboratory, used for testing electronic output during World War II. The roof contains radio towers erected during World War II, which still exist. It was used by the Navy even after the yard's decommissioning and was abandoned in 1994. It is now used by Steiner Studios.
- Building 5 (built 1920), located north of Building 3, is a six-story brick rectangular structure with penthouse. It was used as a light machine shop, an electrical and ordnance structure, and a radio station and laboratory at different points in its history.
- Building 41 (built 1942), located on Morris Avenue between Fourth and Fifth Street, was originally a power plant, replacing another on the same site. It was converted into a cogeneration plant in 1995, using one of the world's largest cranes.
- Building 128 (built c. 1899–1900) is located at Morris Avenue and Sixth Street, near the Cumberland Street entrance. The building is a one-story L-shaped structure made of steel, masonry, and glass, and a high gable-monitor roof. It was formerly a machine and erecting shop, with the long arm of the L pointing northeast to accommodate a long movable crane. Building 128 houses the Green Manufacturing Center, along with a technology hub called Newlab.
- Building 132 (built 1905), located at Warrington Avenue and Fourth Street, was formerly a steam engine repair shop, and now contains light manufacturing.
- Building 280 (built 1942) is located at Morris Avenue and Sixth Street, near the Cumberland Street entrance. It is an eight-story rectangular structure that was formerly used as an ordnance machine shop.
- Building 293 (built c. 1970s) is located northeast of Dry Dock 6, on the northeast side of the yard. It is an 1,000-by-100-foot (305 by 30 m) gable-roofed structure that served as a supply and distribution center. Building 293 was supposed to be a paint fabrication facility for Seatrain Shipbuilding, but the permits were never granted. The building was then converted into a modular apartment manufacturing facility for Forest City Ratner (and later for FullStack Modular), which produced apartments for the nearby Pacific Park development. In 2016, Building 293 was outfitted with one of New York City's largest solar roof installations, a 3,152-panel structure that could generate 1.1 million kilowatt-hours (4,000,000 MJ) of energy. In 2024, after a few successful shows, it was announced that Printworks and Drumsheds operator Broadwick Live and local promoter TCE Presents would take over operations of Building 293 for use as a new 5,000-capacity nightclub and events venue under the name Brooklyn Storehouse.

=== Former structures ===
Admiral's Row featured ten homes in various architectural styles (namely the Greek Revival, Italianate, and French Empire styles). Built between 1864 and 1901, they served as residences to high-ranking Navy Yard officers. The property also contained a timber shed, parade ground, tennis courts, and garages attached to each house. The row was abandoned when the Navy Yard was decommissioned in 1966, and most of the houses were demolished in 2016.

The Brooklyn Navy Yard also contained an artificial island called the Cob Dock. It was originally a mud flat in Wallabout Bay and was reportedly expanded with ballast released by departing ships. Cob Dock became a convenient place for ships to moor, and was once also used by the first flocks of messenger pigeons used by the Navy. Cob Dock was separated from the mainland Navy Yard by Wallabout Channel, a 5-to-20-foot-deep (1.5 to 6.1 m) channel around the southern half of the island that connected to Wallabout Bay on the west and east ends. A structural cribwork was built around the island during the Civil War, and a ship basin was built in the center of the island, while Wallabout Channel was dredged to a lower depth to allow capacity for more boats to moor. After the Civil War, the north end of the island was used to store ordnance, while the south end became a park and training ground. A ferry initially provided service between Cob Dock and the rest of the Navy Yard, but by 1900, it was replaced by a causeway across Wallabout Channel. The southern section of Cob Dock was demolished in the early 1910s to make room for larger ships. The remainder of the island was demolished during World War II to make room for Dry Docks 5 and 6, which were built in 1942.

The Wallabout Market, a city-operated food market formerly located at the eastern end of the Brooklyn Navy Yard, was developed in the late 19th century. The United States Navy Department started leasing 25 acres (10 ha) of waterfront land to the city of Brooklyn in 1877 so that the city could start operating a market, and the Navy received a permit to start operating the market in 1884. The Brooklyn city government gained ownership of Wallabout Market in 1890, and the market later came under the operation of New York City. The market was very close to New York Harbor, so it was easy to import and export goods, but the ground was muddy and the area was frequented by a violent gang that evaded police enforcement. Roads, frame buildings, and a sewage system were installed at Wallabout Market. By the late 1890s, the market contained piers, as well as floating landings for the Delaware, Lackawanna and Western Railroad and the Pennsylvania Railroad. The Wallabout Market site was re-acquired by the Navy and demolished during World War II to make room for Dry Docks 5 and 6.

January 1, 1946
Shipbuilding ways	Width	Length	Source
1	128 feet (39 m)	1,006 feet 9 inches (306.86 m)	
2	128 feet (39 m)	1,006 feet 9 inches (306.86 m)	

== Landmark designations ==
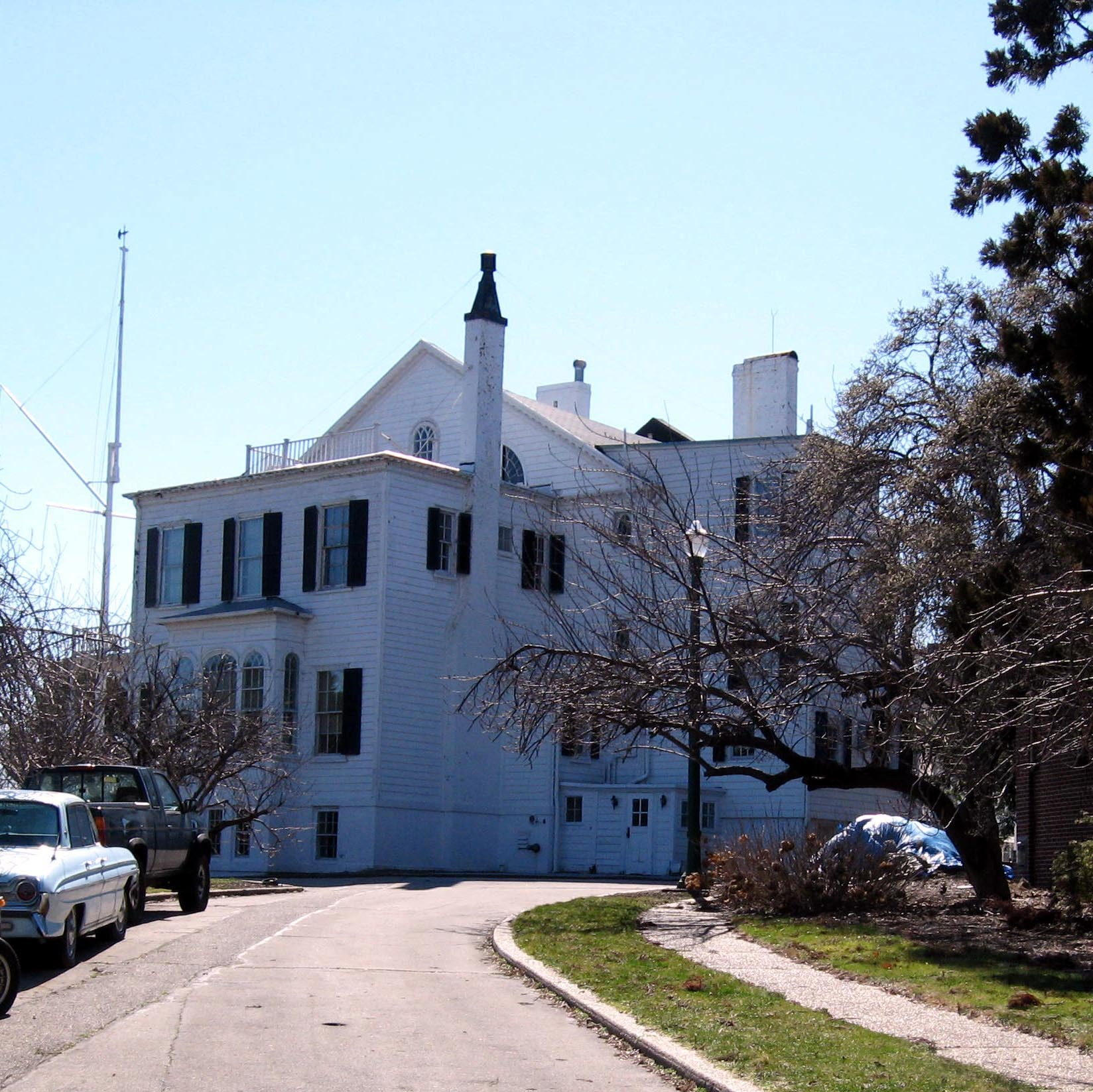
Commander's quarters

In 2014, the entire yard was listed on the National Register of Historic Places (NRHP) as a historic district. Certain buildings have also been given landmark status. Quarters A, the commander's quarters building, is a National Historic Landmark. Dry Dock 1, the Navy Yard Hospital Building (R95), and the Surgeon's Residence (R1) inside the Brooklyn Naval Hospital are all New York City designated landmarks.

A report commissioned by the National Guard in 2008 suggested that the entirety of the Admiral's Row property met the eligibility criteria for inclusion on the NRHP. Admiral's Row sparked a landmarks debate in 2010, having deteriorated to the point of collapse. Ultimately, the city approved a plan to redevelop Admiral's Row as a supermarket. In 2016, nine of the ten historic houses on Admiral's Row were torn down to accommodate 399 Sands Street, the Wegmans supermarket, and the parking lot.

A bronze marker on the Brooklyn Bridge contains a section commemorating the history of the shipyard. The plaque mentions several of the notable ships that were built at Brooklyn Navy Yard, including the Maine; the Missouri; and the last ship constructed there, Duluth.

== Commandants ==
1. Lieutenant Jonathan Thorn, June 1, 1806 – July 13, 1807
2. Captain Isaac Chauncey, July 13, 1807 – May 16, 1813
3. Captain Samuel Evans, May 16, 1813 – June 2, 1824
4. Commander George W. Rodgers, June 2, 1824 – December 21, 1824
5. Captain Isaac Chauncey, December 21, 1824 – June 10, 1833
6. Captain Charles G. Ridgeley, June 10, 1833 – November 19, 1839
7. Captain James Renshaw, November 19, 1839 – June 12, 1841
8. Captain Matthew C. Perry, June 12, 1841 – July 15, 1843
9. Captain Silas H. Stringham, July 15, 1843 – October 1, 1846
10. Captain Isaac McKeever, October 1, 1846 – October 1, 1849
11. Captain William D. Salter, October 1, 1849 – October 14, 1852
12. Captain Charles Boardman, October 14, 1852 – October 1, 1855
13. Captain Abraham Bigelow, October 1, 1855 – June 8, 1857
14. Captain Lawrence Kearny, June 8, 1857 – November 1, 1858
15. Captain Samuel L. Breese, November 1, 1858 – October 25, 1861
16. Captain Hiram Paulding, October 25, 1861 – May 1, 1865
17. Commodore Charles H. Bell, May 1, 1865 – May 1, 1868
18. Rear Admiral Sylvanus W. Godon, May 1, 1868 – October 15, 1870
19. Rear Admiral Melancton Smith, October 15, 1870 – June 1, 1872
20. Vice Admiral Stephen Clegg Rowan, June 1, 1872 – September 1, 1876
21. Commodore James W. Nicholson, September 1, 1876 – May 1, 1880
22. Commodore George H. Cooper, May 1, 1880 – April 1, 1882
23. Commodore John H. Upshur, April 1, 1882 – March 31, 1884
24. Commodore Thomas S. Fillebrown, March 31, 1884 – December 31, 1884
25. Commodore Ralph Chandler, December 31, 1884 – October 15, 1886
26. Commodore Bancroft Gherardi, October 15, 1886 – February 15, 1889
27. Captain Francis M. Ramsay, February 15, 1889 – November 14, 1889
28. Rear Admiral Daniel L. Braine, November 14, 1889 – May 20, 1891
29. Commodore Henry Erben, May 20, 1891 – June 1, 1893
30. Rear Admiral Bancroft Gherardi, June 1, 1893 – November 22, 1894
31. Commodore Montgomery Sicard, November 22, 1894 – May 1, 1897
32. Commodore Francis M. Bunce, May 1, 1897 – January 14, 1899
33. Commodore John Woodward Philip, January 14, 1899 – July 17, 1900
34. Rear Admiral Albert S. Barker, July 17, 1900 – April 1, 1903
35. Rear Admiral Frederick Rodgers, April 1, 1903 – October 3, 1904
36. Rear Admiral Joseph B. Coghlan, October 3, 1904 – June 1, 1907
37. Rear Admiral Caspar F. Goodrich, June 1, 1907 – May 15, 1909
38. Captain Joseph B. Murdock, May 15, 1909 – March 21, 1910
39. Captain Lewis Sayre Van Duzer, April 1910 – July 1913
40. Rear Admiral Eugene H. C. Leutze, March 21, 1910 – June 6, 1912
41. Captain Albert Gleaves, June 6, 1912 – September 28, 1914
42. Rear Admiral Nathaniel R. Usher, September 28, 1914 – February 25, 1918
43. Rear Admiral John D. McDonald, September 28, 1914 – July 1, 1921
44. Rear Admiral Carl T. Vogelgesang, July 1, 1921 – November 27, 1922
45. Rear Admiral Charles P. Plunkett, November 27, 1922 – February 16, 1928
46. Captain Frank Lyon, February 16, 1928 – July 2, 1928
47. Rear Admiral Louis R. de Steiguer, July 2, 1928 – March 18, 1931
48. Rear Admiral William W. Phelps, March 18, 1931 – June 30, 1933
49. Rear Admiral Yates Stirling Jr., June 30, 1933 – March 9, 1936
50. Captain Frederick L. Oliver, March 9, 1936 – April 20, 1936
51. Rear Admiral Harris L. Laning, April 20, 1936 – September 24, 1937
52. Rear Admiral Clark H. Woodward, October 1, 1937 – March 1, 1941
53. Rear Admiral Edward J. Marquart, June 2, 1941 – June 2, 1943
54. Rear Admiral Monroe R. Kelly, June 2, 1943 – December 5, 1944
55. Rear Admiral Freeland A. Daubin, December 5, 1944 – November 25, 1945

== In popular culture ==
Excluding the films shot at Steiner Studios, the following films, TV shows, video games, books, and cultural events are set or have been recorded at the Brooklyn Navy Yard:

- The Brooklyn Navy Yard is featured in the film On the Town (1949) starring Frank Sinatra.
- Portions of the 1987 movie Robot Holocaust and the 2026 feature film Disclosure Day were filmed at the Brooklyn Navy Yard.
- The shipyard is featured in the 2000 video game Deus Ex, as a playable level in which the protagonist must scuttle a freighter docked at the base.
- The Brooklyn Navy Yard is featured in the 2008 video game Tom Clancy's EndWar, as a playable battlefield. In the game, the yard is refitting the aircraft carrier USS Ronald Reagan into a Mobile Offshore Base.
- A Harry Houdini-themed task was performed at the Brooklyn Navy Yard in the final leg of The Amazing Race 21 (2012).
- The Brooklyn Navy Yard is prominently featured in Jennifer Egan's 2017 novel Manhattan Beach (Scribner ISBN 978-1-5011-8991-3). The main protagonist, Anna Kerrigan, works at the Navy Yard as a parts inspector and, subsequently, as the yard's first female diver.
- ArtRave, a promotional concert hosted by the singer Lady Gaga for her album Artpop, was held at Brooklyn Navy Yard's Duggal Greenhouse on November 10 and 11, 2013.
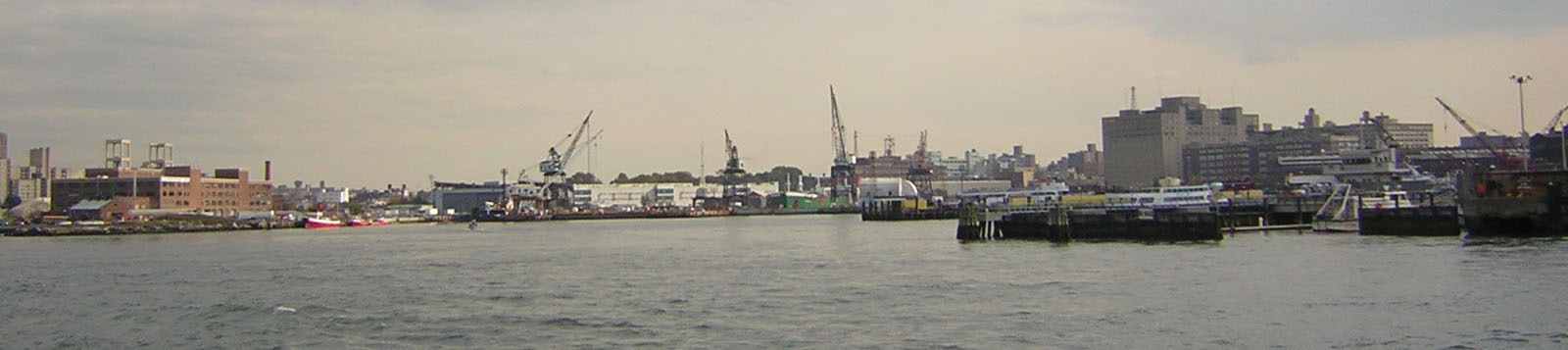
The yard seen from mid-stream East River
