= Steiner (surname) =

Steiner is a German surname (derived from Stein, meaning a stone, or rock). The name is of Bavarian origin and refers to a person dwelling near a stone, or rock boundary. The name Steiner is common in Bavaria, Switzerland (9th most common surname) and Austria (7th most common surname). Notable people with the surname include:

- Abby Steiner (born 1999), American sprinter
- Achim Steiner (born 1961), German expert in environmental politics
- Adalbert Steiner II (1907–1984), Romanian football defender
- A. L. Steiner (born 1967), American multimedia artist, author and educator
- Andreas Steiner (athlete) (born 1964), Austrian athlete
- André Steiner (photographer) (1901–1978), Hungarian-born French photographer and photojournalist
- André Steiner (rower) (born 1970), German rower
- Andrew Steiner (1908–2009), Czechoslovak-American architect
- Anton Steiner (born 1958), Austrian skier
- April Steiner Bennett (born 1980), American pole vaulter
- Ben Steiner (1921–1988), American baseball player
- Bernard Christian Steiner (1867–1926), United States educator, librarian and jurist
- Betty Wilson Steiner-Conduit (1920–1994), Canadian psychiatrist working with transgender and intersex people
- Bob Steiner (c. 1946–2020), Canadian football player
- Brandon Steiner (born 1959), American sports marketer
- Catherine Steiner-Adair, American clinical psychologist and school consultant
- Cecil C. Steiner (1896–1989), American orthodontist
- Charley Steiner (born 1949), American sportscaster
- Christian Steiner (soldier) (1843–1880), German-born American soldier in the U.S. Army
- Christian Steiner (ice dancer) (1960–2025), German ice dancer
- Christoph Steiner (born 1988), Austrian politician
- Christophe Steiner (born 1958), Monegasque politician
- Claude Steiner (1935–2017), clinical psychologist and transactional analyst
- David Steiner (AIPAC), American real estate developer, former President of the American Israel Public Affairs Committee
- David Eduard Steiner (1811–1860), Swiss painter
- David J. Steiner (1965–2016), American documentary filmmaker, educator and political activist
- David P. Steiner (born 1960), American businessman and director for Vulcan Materials
- Daniel Steiner (born 1973), Austrian actor and film director
- Derik Steiner (born 1987), American football fullback
- Donald Frederick Steiner (1930–2014), American biochemist and professor
- Douglas Craig Steiner (born 1960), American Brooklyn-based real estate developer
- Elio Steiner (1904–1965), Italian stage and film actor
- Elizabeth Steiner Hayward (born c. 1963), American Democratic member of the Oregon Senate
- Elsa Steiner (born 1968), French film, TV, and stage actress
- Emma Roberto Steiner (1856–1929), American composer and conductor
- Endre Steiner (1901–1944), Hungarian-born chess player
- Felix Steiner (1896–1966), German Waffen-SS officer
- Ferdinand Steiner, gymnast from Bohemia
- Ferenc Steiner (born 1888, date of death unknown), Hungarian cyclist
- Frances Steiner (born 1937), American conductor, cellist and professor emeritus
- Franz Baermann Steiner (1909–1952), German/Czech anthropologist, polymath and poet
- Fred Steiner (1923–2011), American composer
- Gabriel Steiner (1883–1965), German-American neurologist known for his research of multiple sclerosis
- George Steiner (1929–2020), French-American literary critic
- Gerolf Steiner (1908–2009), German zoologist
- Gitta Steiner (1932–1990), American composer
- Giuseppe Steiner (disambiguation), several people
- Guenther Steiner (born 1965), Italian motorsport engineer and manager
- H. Steiner, Austro-Hungarian Klezmer violinist of the early twentieth century
- Hans Steiner (1946–2022), Austrian professor of Psychiatry & Behavioral Sciences, Child & Adolescent Psychiatry
- Heidemarie Steiner (born 1944), German figure skater and coach
- Heinrich Steiner (1911–2009), German painter and printmaker
- Helen Steiner Rice (1900–1981), American writer of religious and inspirational poetry
- Henry Steiner (born 1934), Austrian graphic designer, best known for his corporate identity designs
- Shelley Steiner (born 1961), Canadian Olympic fencer
- Helena de Figueiredo Steiner (born 1953), Brazilian judge, member of the International Criminal Court from 2003 to 2016
- Herman Steiner (1905–1955), American chess champion, organizer, and columnist
- Herman G. Steiner (1897–1982), American sports coach
- Hermann Steiner (1913-2005), Swiss inventor and businessman
- Hillel Steiner (born 1942), Canadian professor of political philosophy
- Hugo Steiner, Swiss endocrinologist
- Jacqueline Steiner (1924–2019), American folk singer, songwriter and social activist
- Jean-François Steiner (born 1938), French-Jewish writer
- Jakob Steiner (1796–1863), Swiss geometer and mathematician, cf. Steiner tree
- Jacob D. Steiner (1861–date of death unknown), American member of the South Dakota House of Representatives
- Jeffrey Steiner (1937–2008), Austrian CEO of the Fairchild Corporation
- Jerry Steiner (1918–2012), American professional basketball player
- Jessica Steiner (born 1990), German politician
- Joan C. Steiner (1943–2010), American illustrator and puzzle designer
- John Steiner (1941–2022), English actor
- John Steiner (psychoanalyst) (born 1934), author and trainer at the British Psychoanalytical Society
- John A. Steiner (1816–1902), American politician and military officer from Maryland
- John Michael Steiner (1925–2014), Czech-American sociologist and Holocaust researcher
- Josef Steiner (disambiguation), multiple people
- Joshua Steiner (born ca. 1980), Colorado author in science fiction
- Josy Gyr-Steiner (1949–2007), Swiss politician and member of the Swiss National Council (2003–2007)
- Karel Steiner (1895–1934), Czech footballer
- Karlo Štajner (1902–1992), Austrian-Yugoslav communist activist and prominent gulag survivor
- Kate Stilley Steiner, American award-winning filmmaker, editor, and producer
- Kenneth Donald Steiner (born 1936), American Catholic auxiliary bishop
- Kilian von Steiner (1833–1903), German banker and industrialist
- Lajos Steiner (1903–1975), Hungarian–born Australian chess master
- Leo Steiner (c. 1939–1987), Jewish American restaurateur
- Leonardo Ulrich Steiner (born 1950), Brazilian Catholic archbishop
- Leonhard Steiner (1836–1920), Swiss writer and painter
- Lewis Henry Steiner (1827–1892), American physician and librarian
- Liliana Fernández Steiner (born 1987), Spanish beach volleyball player
- Linda Claire Steiner (born 1950), American academic and journalist
- Lisa Steiner, Austrian-born American immunologist and professor at the Massachusetts Institute of Technology
- Lisl Steiner (1927–2023), Austrian-American photojournalist and documentary filmmaker
- Manfred Steiner (disambiguation), several people
- Marc Steiner, American radio talk show and podcast host
- Maria Steiner, Austrian honored as one of the Righteous Among the Nations
- Marie Steiner-von Sivers (1867–1948), second wife and close colleague of Rudolf Steiner
- Mario Steiner (born 1982), Austrian football midfielder
- Mark Steiner (1942–2020), professor of philosophy of mathematics and physics at the Hebrew University of Jerusalem
- Matthias Steiner (born 1982), Austrian-German weightlifter
- Max Steiner (1888–1971), Hollywood film composer
- Maximilian Steiner (1839–1880), Austrian actor and theatre manager
- Mel Steiner (1916–1997), American professional baseball umpire
- Michael Steiner (born 1949), German diplomat, head of the UN Mission in Kosovo (UNMIK)
- Monika Steiner (born 1972), Swiss-born artist and sculptor
- Nancy Steiner, American costume designer
- Pál Steiner (born 1953), Hungarian politician, mayor of the 5th district of Budapest (2002-2006)
- Paul Steiner (born 1957), German football player
- Paul Steiner (language creator), German volapükist
- Pavol Steiner (1908–1969), Czechoslovak/Slovak Olympic water polo player and cardiac surgeon
- Peter Steiner (cartoonist) (born 1940), American cartoonist, painter and novelist
- Peter "Cool Man" Steiner (1917–2007), music-making Swiss advertising character
- Peter Otto Steiner (1922–2010), American economist and former President of the American Association of University Professors
- Philipp Steiner (born 1986), Austrian football defender
- Ralph Steiner (1899–1986), American photographer
- Ray G. Steiner, American basketball player
- Rebel Roy Steiner, Sr. (1927–2014), American football offensive end
- Red Steiner (1915–2001), American baseball player
- Richard C Steiner (born 1945), Professor of Semitics at Yeshiva University
- Rick Steiner (born 1961), ring name of American professional wrestler Robert Rechsteiner
- Richard Harris Steiner (1946–2016), American five-time Tony Award-winning Broadway producer
- Robert Steiner (disambiguation), multiple people
- Roland A. Steiner (c. 1840–1906), American physician, planter, folklorist, and amateur archaeologist
- Rolf Steiner (born 1933), German soldier of fortune
- Ronald John Steiner (1938–2015), American football and baseball coach
- Roswitha Steiner (born 1963), Austrian alpine skier
- Rubin Steiner (né Frédérick Landier; 1974), French DJ, guitar, bass, and keyboard musician
- Rudolf Steiner (disambiguation), several people
  - Rudolf Steiner (1861–1925), Austrian writer and spiritual leader, founder of anthroposophy and related movements
- Samuel Ray Delany Jr. (born 1942), American author and literary critic
- Scott Steiner (born 1962), ring name of American professional wrestler Scott Rechsteiner
- Scott A. Steiner (born 1973), Judge of the Orange County Superior Court in California
- Sigfrit Steiner (1906–1988), Swiss actor
- Stan Steiner (1925–1987), American historian and teacher
- Stjepan Steiner (1915–2006), Croatian physician, cardiologist and personal physician of Josip Tito
- Thomas Steiner (director) (born 1956), Austrian experimental film director, and painter
- Thomas Steiner (politician) (born 1967), Austrian politician
- Tim Steiner (born 1965), British composer
- Tim Steiner (businessman) (born 1969), British businessman, CEO of Ocado
- Tito Steiner (born 1952), Argentine decathlete
- Tommy Shane Steiner (born 1973), American country music artist
- Udo Steiner (born 1939), Judge at the Federal Constitutional Court of Germany from 1995 to 2007
- Victor Steiner, Sr., Salvadoran scouting official
- Vicky Steiner (born 1956), American politician, member of the North Dakota House of Representatives
- Walter Steiner (born 1951), Swiss ski jumper
- Walter Steiner (rower) (1946–2020), Swiss rower
- Walter Steiner (sailor) (born 1946), Swiss sailor
- Wernher Steiner (1492–1542), military chaplain and chronicler of the Swiss history
- William G. Steiner (1937–2022), American politician and child advocate
- Yeshaya Steiner (1851–1925), rabbi, founder of the Kerestir Hasidic dynasty
- Zara Steiner, FBA (née Shakow; 1928–2020), American-born British historian and academic

== Fictional characters ==
- Adelbert Steiner, fictional character from the video game Final Fantasy IX
- Daisy Steiner, fictional character from the television comedy series Spaced
- Friedrich Steiner, fictional Nazi scientist and antagonist from the video game Call of Duty: Black Ops
- House Steiner, fictional Inner Sphere family from the BattleTech game franchise
- Kurt Steiner, fictional Oberst (Colonel) in the German Fallschirmjäger (Paratroopers) in the John Sturges directed World War II film The Eagle Has Landed
- Rion Steiner, fictional character and protagonist of the video game Galerians
- Rolf Steiner, fictional German Platoon Sergeant in the Sam Peckinpah directed World War II film Cross of Iron
- Rudy Steiner, fictional character of the book The Book Thief
