= Josef Steiner =

Josef Steiner may refer to:

- Josef Steiner (politician, born 1862)
- Josef Steiner (politician, born 1901) (1901–1973)
- Josef Steiner (politician, born 1926) (1926–1990)
- Josef Steiner (runner) (born 1950), Austrian long-distance runner, competed for Austria at the 1980 Summer Olympics#Athletics
