= 2023 EchoPark Automotive Grand Prix =

NASCAR Cup Series race

Race details
- Race 6 of 36 in the 2023 NASCAR Cup Series
- Date: March 26, 2023
- Location: Circuit of the Americas in Austin, Texas
- Course: Permanent racing facility
- Course length: 5.514 km (3.426 miles)
- Distance: 75 laps, 255.75 mi (411.857 km)
- Scheduled distance: 68 laps, 231 mi (372 km)
- Average speed: 72.886 miles per hour (117.299 km/h)

Pole position
Driver	William Byron	Hendrick Motorsports
- Time: 2:10.760

Most laps led
Driver	Tyler Reddick	23XI Racing
- Laps: 41

Winner
No. 45	Tyler Reddick	23XI Racing

Television in the United States
- Network: Fox
- Announcers: Mike Joy, Clint Bowyer, Kurt Busch, Guenther Steiner, and Chase Elliott (Remotely)

Radio in the United States
- Radio: PRN
- Booth announcers: Doug Rice and Mark Garrow
- Turn announcers: Rob Albright (1), Doug Turnbull (2 to Becketts), Mark Jaynes (Chapel to S to Senna), Nick Yeoman (Sepang Hairpin), Pat Patterson (Motodrom), and Brad Gillie (Istanbul 8 to Turn 20)

The 2023 EchoPark Automotive Grand Prix was a NASCAR Cup Series race held on March 26, 2023, at Circuit of the Americas in Austin, Texas. Contested over 75 laps, extended from 68 laps due to an overtime finish, on the 3.426-mile (5.514 km) road course, it was the sixth race of the 2023 NASCAR Cup Series season.

== Report ==
=== Background ===
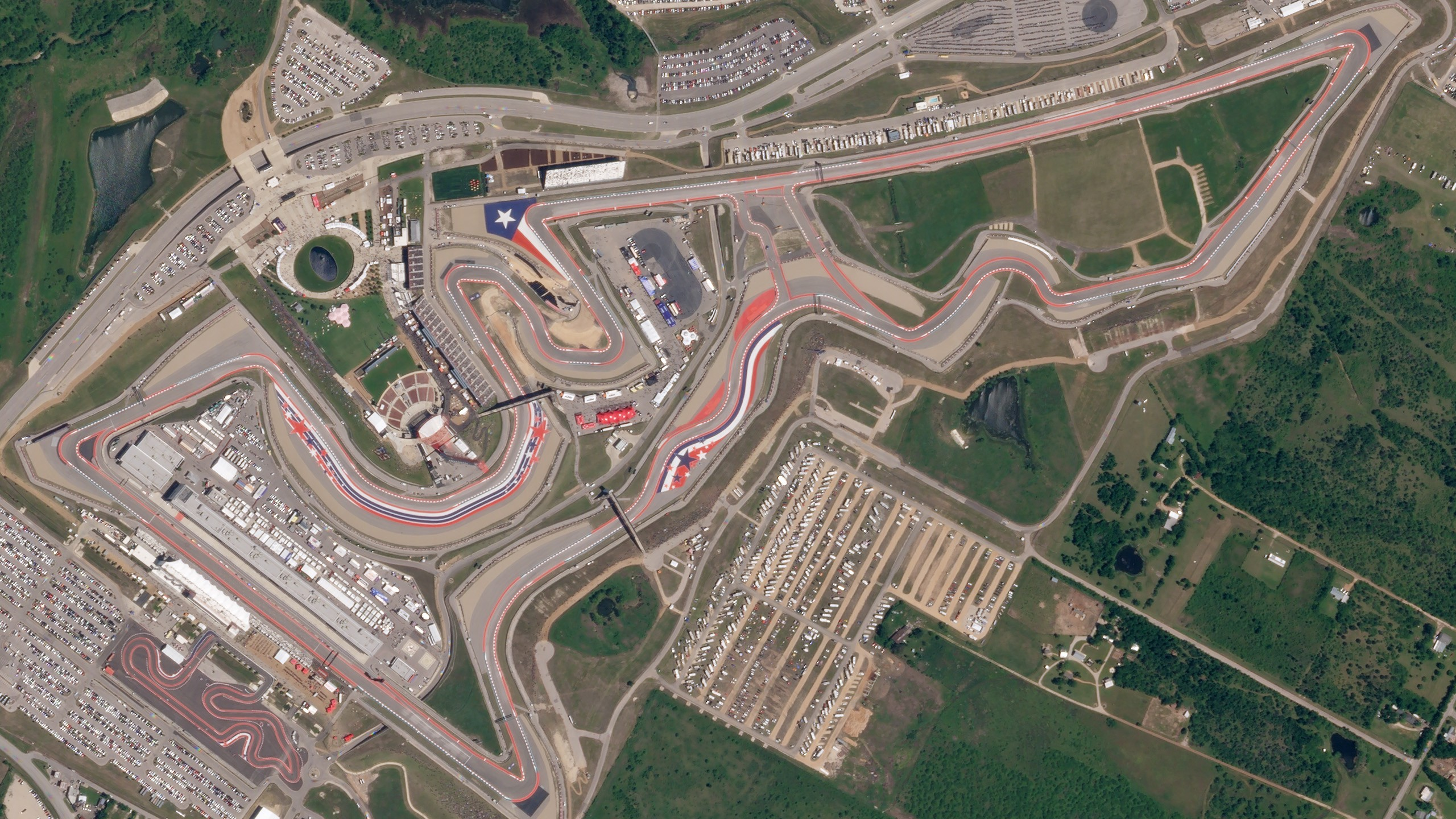
Aerial view of Circuit of the Americas, the track where the race was held.

Circuit of the Americas (COTA) is a grade 1 FIA-specification motorsports facility located within the extraterritorial jurisdiction of Austin, Texas. It features a 3.426-mile (5.514 km) road racing circuit. The facility is home to the Formula One United States Grand Prix, and the Motorcycle Grand Prix of the Americas, a round of the FIM Road Racing World Championship. It previously hosted the Supercars Championship, the FIA World Endurance Championship, the IMSA SportsCar Championship, and IndyCar Series.

==== Entry list ====
- (R) denotes rookie driver.
- (i) denotes driver who is ineligible for series driver points.

No.	Driver	Team	Manufacturer
1	Ross Chastain	Trackhouse Racing	Chevrolet
2	Austin Cindric	Team Penske	Ford
3	Austin Dillon	Richard Childress Racing	Chevrolet
4	Kevin Harvick	Stewart-Haas Racing	Ford
5	Kyle Larson	Hendrick Motorsports	Chevrolet
6	Brad Keselowski	RFK Racing	Ford
7	Corey LaJoie	Spire Motorsports	Chevrolet
8	Kyle Busch	Richard Childress Racing	Chevrolet
9	Jordan Taylor	Hendrick Motorsports	Chevrolet
10	Aric Almirola	Stewart-Haas Racing	Ford
11	Denny Hamlin	Joe Gibbs Racing	Toyota
12	Ryan Blaney	Team Penske	Ford
14	Chase Briscoe	Stewart-Haas Racing	Ford
15	Jenson Button	Rick Ware Racing	Ford
16	A. J. Allmendinger	Kaulig Racing	Chevrolet
17	Chris Buescher	RFK Racing	Ford
19	Martin Truex Jr.	Joe Gibbs Racing	Toyota
20	Christopher Bell	Joe Gibbs Racing	Toyota
21	Harrison Burton	Wood Brothers Racing	Ford
22	Joey Logano	Team Penske	Ford
23	Bubba Wallace	23XI Racing	Toyota
24	William Byron	Hendrick Motorsports	Chevrolet
31	Justin Haley	Kaulig Racing	Chevrolet
34	Michael McDowell	Front Row Motorsports	Ford
38	Todd Gilliland	Front Row Motorsports	Ford
41	Ryan Preece	Stewart-Haas Racing	Ford
42	Noah Gragson (R)	Legacy Motor Club	Chevrolet
43	Erik Jones	Legacy Motor Club	Chevrolet
45	Tyler Reddick	23XI Racing	Toyota
47	Ricky Stenhouse Jr.	JTG Daugherty Racing	Chevrolet
48	Alex Bowman	Hendrick Motorsports	Chevrolet
50	Conor Daly	The Money Team Racing	Chevrolet
51	Cody Ware	Rick Ware Racing	Ford
54	Ty Gibbs (R)	Joe Gibbs Racing	Toyota
77	Ty Dillon	Spire Motorsports	Chevrolet
78	Josh Bilicki (i)	Live Fast Motorsports	Chevrolet
84	Jimmie Johnson	Legacy Motor Club	Chevrolet
91	Kimi Räikkönen	Trackhouse Racing	Chevrolet
99	Daniel Suárez	Trackhouse Racing	Chevrolet
Official entry list

== Practice ==
Tyler Reddick was the fastest in the practice session with a time of 2:12.016 seconds and a speed of 92.989 mph (149.651 km/h).

=== Practice results ===
Pos	No.	Driver	Team	Manufacturer	Time	Speed
1	45	Tyler Reddick	23XI Racing	Toyota	2:12.016	92.989
2	5	Kyle Larson	Hendrick Motorsports	Chevrolet	2:12.544	92.618
3	1	Ross Chastain	Trackhouse Racing	Chevrolet	2:12.685	92.520
Official practice results

== Qualifying ==
William Byron scored the pole for the race with a time of 2:10.760 and a speed of 93.882 mph (151.088 km/h).

=== Qualifying results ===
Pos	No.	Driver	Team	Manufacturer	R1	R2
1	24	William Byron	Hendrick Motorsports	Chevrolet	2:11.746	2:10.760
2	45	Tyler Reddick	23XI Racing	Toyota	2:10.305	2:10.898
3	2	Austin Cindric	Team Penske	Ford	2:11.215	2:11.352
4	9	Jordan Taylor	Hendrick Motorsports	Chevrolet	2:11.020	2:11.754
5	99	Daniel Suárez	Trackhouse Racing	Chevrolet	2:11.884	2:11.905
6	48	Alex Bowman	Hendrick Motorsports	Chevrolet	2:11.401	2:12.127
7	16	A. J. Allmendinger	Kaulig Racing	Chevrolet	2:11.861	2:12.228
8	43	Erik Jones	Legacy Motor Club	Chevrolet	2:11.678	2:12.230
9	8	Kyle Busch	Richard Childress Racing	Chevrolet	2:11.413	2:12.459
10	42	Noah Gragson (R)	Legacy Motor Club	Chevrolet	2:11.909	2:13.162
11	23	Bubba Wallace	23XI Racing	Toyota	2:11.498	—
12	1	Ross Chastain	Trackhouse Racing	Chevrolet	2:11.562	—
13	5	Kyle Larson	Hendrick Motorsports	Chevrolet	2:12.039	—
14	20	Christopher Bell	Joe Gibbs Racing	Toyota	2:12.112	—
15	22	Joey Logano	Team Penske	Ford	2:12.125	—
16	21	Harrison Burton	Wood Brothers Racing	Ford	2:12.219	—
17	54	Ty Gibbs (R)	Joe Gibbs Racing	Toyota	2:12.323	—
18	47	Ricky Stenhouse Jr.	JTG Daugherty Racing	Chevrolet	2:12.359	—
19	14	Chase Briscoe	Stewart-Haas Racing	Ford	2:12.401	—
20	34	Michael McDowell	Front Row Motorsports	Ford	2:12.498	—
21	11	Denny Hamlin	Joe Gibbs Racing	Toyota	2:12.500	—
22	91	Kimi Räikkönen	Trackhouse Racing	Chevrolet	2:12.526	—
23	31	Justin Haley	Kaulig Racing	Chevrolet	2:12.539	—
24	15	Jenson Button	Rick Ware Racing	Ford	2:12.559	—
25	19	Martin Truex Jr.	Joe Gibbs Racing	Toyota	2:12.575	—
26	41	Ryan Preece	Stewart-Haas Racing	Ford	2:12.629	—
27	7	Corey LaJoie	Spire Motorsports	Chevrolet	2:12.756	—
28	3	Austin Dillon	Richard Childress Racing	Chevrolet	2:12.781	—
29	4	Kevin Harvick	Stewart-Haas Racing	Ford	2:12.869	—
30	6	Brad Keselowski	RFK Racing	Ford	2:12.929	—
31	84	Jimmie Johnson	Legacy Motor Club	Chevrolet	2:12.938	—
32	17	Chris Buescher	RFK Racing	Ford	2:13.218	—
33	78	Josh Bilicki (i)	Live Fast Motorsports	Chevrolet	2:13.274	—
34	77	Ty Dillon	Spire Motorsports	Chevrolet	2:13.567	—
35	50	Conor Daly	The Money Team Racing	Chevrolet	2:13.792	—
36	38	Todd Gilliland	Front Row Motorsports	Ford	2:14.038	—
37	51	Cody Ware	Rick Ware Racing	Ford	2:14.858	—
38	12	Ryan Blaney	Team Penske	Ford	2:20.865	—
39	10	Aric Almirola	Stewart-Haas Racing	Ford	3:02.392	—
Official qualifying results

== Race ==
=== Report ===
==== Stage 1 ====
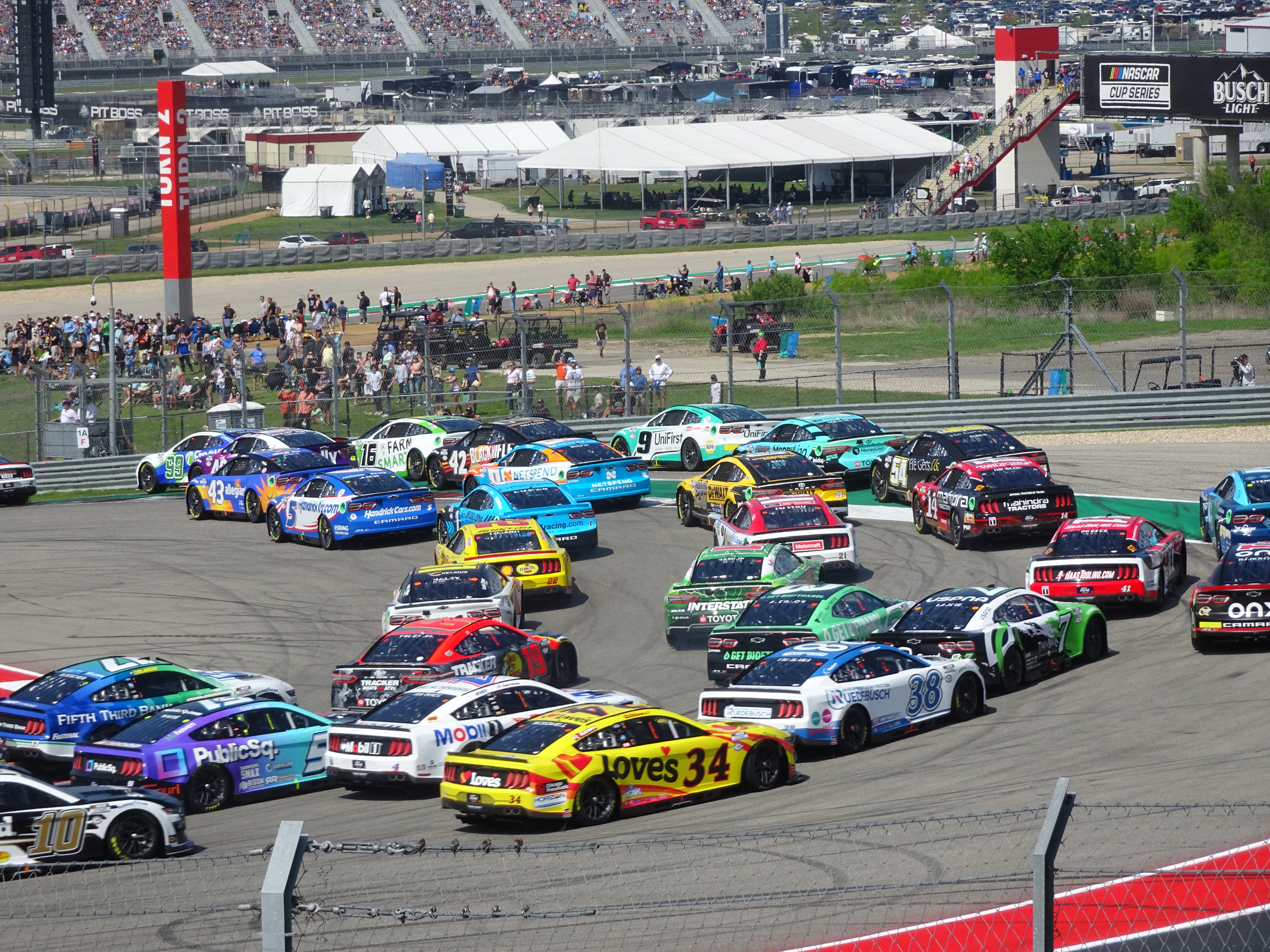
Turn 1 after restart

The race starts with William Byron and Tyler Reddick on the front row. When the green flag is dropped, Reddick has a slow start and loses position to Austin Cindric, but manages to recover on the back straight. Byron leads the first lap with a lead of 8 tenths of a second.

On the second lap, Brad Keselowski stops at the pit entrance and the first yellow flag is shown. Chris Buescher and Ty Dillon have a collision, which causes the latter to spin and hit Jimmie Johnson. At the start of the race, Jordan Taylor drops to ninth place, while Kyle Larson advances to tenth place. Erik Jones and Noah Gragson manage to advance to 7th and 8th place, respectively.

The race restarts on lap 6 and Cindric takes advantage to take the lead after Byron and Reddick go a little long in turn one. Byron drops to third and Jordan Taylor locks up the front tires and loses positions, dropping out of the top 10.

Joey Logano, Denny Hamlin and Corey LaJoie pit to serve a drive-through penalty for cutting through the sprint section.

On lap 8, Cindric and Reddick swap positions several times, but Reddick finally takes the lead on the final section of the circuit. Moments later, Byron overtakes Cindric and moves back into second.

On lap 11, Kyle Larson spins due to Bubba Wallace having brake failure. Larson touches with Denny Hamlin on the way to the last corner of the circuit, which generates the second yellow flag. Bubba Wallace retires from the race.

Several drivers stop on lap 12, including Tyler Reddick, Noah Gragson, Erik Jones, Austin Dillon, Ryan Blaney, Denny Hamlin and Kimi Räikkönen, committing to three stops.

==== Stage 2 ====
The race restarts on lap 16 and Byron takes the lead over Cindric.

Conor Daly heads to the garages, while Keselowski is touched by Ryan Blaney and the latter is touched by Kyle Larson a few corners later.

On lap 24, Cindric, Ross Chastain and Alex Bowman pit, followed by Byron, Allmendinger and Suarez on lap 25. On lap 27, Reddick assumes the race lead, followed by Austin Dillon with a 3.6-second advantage and Michael McDowell.

On lap 28 and with just three laps to go in the second stage, Tyler Reddick managed to increase his lead over Austin Dillon by more than six seconds. On the other hand, Ty Gibbs was penalized for cutting the esses, while Kyle Larson received a penalty for exceeding the speed limit.

The second stage came to an end with a solid performance by Reddick, who managed to increase his lead to more than seven seconds over Dillon. Michael McDowell, Kevin Harvick, Buescher, Ricky Stenhouse Jr, Larson, Erik Jones, Chase Briscoe and Noah Gragson also scored points in this stage.

==== Final Stage ====
On lap 32, Harvick and Dillon pit, while Reddick stays on track to take advantage of the 3-stop strategy. On the next lap, Reddick pitted, leaving Buescher in the lead with one stop remaining.

Buescher holds the lead until lap 35, when he pits for his second stop and William Byron takes the lead followed by Allmendinger with a 1.5 second gap. Suarez, Chastain and Kyle Busch complete the top 5, being those who went for two stops, while Reddick, who was going for 3 stops, is in sixth place 7.3 seconds behind the leader.

On lap 36, Reddick manages to overtake Allmendinger and moves into second place, just 3 seconds behind Byron. On the other hand, Christopher Bell spun due to the dirt in one of the turns, but managed to get back on track.

On lap 39, Reddick manages to overtake Byron in the first corner and takes the first position. Meanwhile, Denny Hamlin also suffers a spin similar to Bell's, but continues to race. The yellow flag is shown for the third time due to debris on the track.

The yellow flag evens the strategies and all drivers pit on lap 42. Allmendinger loses several positions after the pit stop. Logano, Harrison Burton and Cody Ware stay on track taking the first three positions.

On the restart on lap 44, Reddick tries to take the lead in turn 1, but goes a little wide, allowing Byron and Chastain to take the lead. Logano has to lift his foot off the gas as he is held up by Byron and Reddick.

On lap 45, Reddick made a daring move at turn 11 and went side by side with Chastain on the long straight, ultimately securing second place.

As they reached turn 11 on the following lap, Reddick made an attempt to pass for the lead, succeeding momentarily before Byron counterattacked and the two went side by side through the final sector, with Byron ultimately taking the lead.

On lap 46, Reddick made an inside move at turn 1 but was unable to get past Byron. The driver of car #24 protected the inside line at turn 11 and managed to fend off Reddick's challenge. However, Reddick continued to push and finally overtook Byron on the inside after the long straight, claiming the lead of the race. Kyle Larson suffers a broken toe link in the rear.

On lap 52, the top 4 were separated by a mere 2.4 seconds due to fuel conservation. By lap 55, Bowman had fallen so far behind the leaders that he was overtaken by Daniel Suarez for fourth place. The Mexican driver was trailing Reddick by 3 seconds.

With only 12 laps remaining in the scheduled race, the top 4 were now separated by just 1.1 seconds, all while still conserving fuel. The two Trackhouse drivers overtook Byron, whose car was unstable on the dirt, while Suarez took second place by bumping his teammate. Brad Keselowski's car came to a stop, prompting a yellow flag.

Most of the drivers pit with 11 laps to go. Byron comes out second, ahead of Suarez and behind Reddick. Chastain loses time and positions due to delays in securing the right front tire nut. Bell stays out and becomes the leader, followed by Kyle Busch, Denny Hamlin, Kimi Raikkonen, and Ryan Preece on the same strategy.

On lap 59, the race resumes. Reddick takes the lead on the inside of turn 1, having started in fifth place. Several cars spin out, including Austin Dillon and Ross Chastain, who cannot immediately resume the race, resulting in a yellow flag. Denny Hamlin has to pit due to a flat tire.

Lap 61, race restart with Reddick and Bell leading the pack. Reddick overshoots the first corner and Byron takes the lead. Kyle Busch moves up to third place. Bell spins out. Allmendinger retires from the race.

It's now a head-to-head battle between Byron and Reddick for the win, with half a second separating them. Kyle Busch is far behind in third place, trailing by 2.4 seconds. On lap 63, Reddick overtakes Byron and takes the lead. A yellow flag is waved with four laps remaining due to debris on the track. Austin Dillon's car was seen smoking from the left rear section.

On the first Overtime attempt to finish the race, Byron goes a little wide in turn one, with Kyle Busch running second. Yellow flag for debris from Ryan Blaney's car. Ryan Preece with heavy damage.

On the second Overtime attempt, Daniel Suarez (pushed by Bowman) spins Martin Truex Jr. Yellow flag for Daniel Suarez's dislodged tire.

Third Overtime Attempt with Reddick and Bowman leading the ranks. Restart, Reddick takes the lead. Bell with major damage to his hood. The white flag is waved being the final lap of the race, with Kyle Busch overtaking Bowman for second place, albeit far from first place, 1.6 seconds behind Reddick. Finally, Tyler Reddick crosses the finish line as the race winner. Completing the top 5 are Kyle Busch, Alex Bowman, Ross Chastain and William Byron.

=== Race results ===
==== Stage Results ====
Stage One Laps: 15

Pos	No	Driver	Team	Manufacturer	Points
1	24	William Byron	Hendrick Motorsports	Chevrolet	10
2	2	Austin Cindric	Team Penske	Ford	9
3	16	A. J. Allmendinger	Kaulig Racing	Chevrolet	8
4	48	Alex Bowman	Hendrick Motorsports	Chevrolet	7
5	1	Ross Chastain	Trackhouse Racing	Chevrolet	6
6	99	Daniel Suárez	Trackhouse Racing	Chevrolet	5
7	8	Kyle Busch	Richard Childress Racing	Chevrolet	4
8	9	Jordan Taylor	Hendrick Motorsports	Chevrolet	3
9	20	Christopher Bell	Joe Gibbs Racing	Toyota	2
10	41	Ryan Preece	Stewart-Haas Racing	Ford	1
Official stage one results

Stage Two Laps: 15

Pos	No	Driver	Team	Manufacturer	Points
1	45	Tyler Reddick	23XI Racing	Toyota	10
2	3	Austin Dillon	Richard Childress Racing	Chevrolet	9
3	34	Michael McDowell	Front Row Motorsports	Ford	8
4	4	Kevin Harvick	Stewart-Haas Racing	Ford	7
5	17	Chris Buescher	RFK Racing	Ford	6
6	47	Ricky Stenhouse Jr.	JTG Daugherty Racing	Chevrolet	5
7	5	Kyle Larson	Hendrick Motorsports	Chevrolet	4
8	43	Erik Jones	Legacy Motor Club	Chevrolet	3
9	14	Chase Briscoe	Stewart-Haas Racing	Ford	2
10	42	Noah Gragson (R)	Legacy Motor Club	Chevrolet	1
Official stage one results

=== Final Stage Results ===
Stage Three Laps: 38

Pos	Grid	No	Driver	Team	Manufacturer	Laps	Points
1	2	45	Tyler Reddick	23XI Racing	Toyota	75	50
2	9	8	Kyle Busch	Richard Childress Racing	Chevrolet	75	39
3	6	48	Alex Bowman	Hendrick Motorsports	Chevrolet	75	41
4	12	1	Ross Chastain	Trackhouse Racing	Chevrolet	75	39
5	1	24	William Byron	Hendrick Motorsports	Chevrolet	75	42
6	3	2	Austin Cindric	Team Penske	Ford	75	40
7	18	47	Ricky Stenhouse Jr.	JTG Daugherty Racing	Chevrolet	75	35
8	32	17	Chris Buescher	RFK Racing	Ford	75	35
9	17	54	Ty Gibbs (R)	Joe Gibbs Racing	Toyota	75	28
10	36	38	Todd Gilliland	Front Row Motorsports	Ford	75	27
11	27	7	Corey LaJoie	Spire Motorsports	Chevrolet	75	26
12	20	34	Michael McDowell	Front Row Motorsports	Ford	75	33
13	29	4	Kevin Harvick	Stewart-Haas Racing	Ford	75	31
14	13	5	Kyle Larson	Hendrick Motorsports	Chevrolet	75	27
15	19	14	Chase Briscoe	Stewart-Haas Racing	Ford	75	24
16	21	11	Denny Hamlin	Joe Gibbs Racing	Toyota	75	21
17	25	19	Martin Truex Jr.	Joe Gibbs Racing	Toyota	75	20
18	24	15	Jenson Button	Rick Ware Racing	Ford	75	19
19	23	31	Justin Haley	Kaulig Racing	Chevrolet	75	18
20	10	42	Noah Gragson (R)	Legacy Motor Club	Chevrolet	75	18
21	38	12	Ryan Blaney	Team Penske	Ford	75	16
22	16	21	Harrison Burton	Wood Brothers Racing	Ford	75	15
23	8	43	Erik Jones	Legacy Motor Club	Chevrolet	75	17
24	4	9	Jordan Taylor	Hendrick Motorsports	Chevrolet	75	16
25	37	51	Cody Ware	Rick Ware Racing	Ford	75	12
26	33	78	Josh Bilicki (i)	Live Fast Motorsports	Chevrolet	75	0
27	5	99	Daniel Suárez	Trackhouse Racing	Chevrolet	75	15
28	15	22	Joey Logano	Team Penske	Ford	75	9
29	22	91	Kimi Räikkönen	Trackhouse Racing	Chevrolet	75	8
30	39	10	Aric Almirola	Stewart-Haas Racing	Ford	74	7
31	14	20	Christopher Bell	Joe Gibbs Racing	Toyota	73	8
32	25	41	Ryan Preece	Stewart-Haas Racing	Ford	68	6
33	28	3	Austin Dillon	Richard Childress Racing	Chevrolet	62	13
34	7	16	A. J. Allmendinger	Kaulig Racing	Chevrolet	60	11
35	30	6	Brad Keselowski	RFK Racing	Ford	56	2
36	35	50	Conor Daly	The Money Team Racing	Chevrolet	16	1
37	11	23	Bubba Wallace	23XI Racing	Toyota	10	1
38	31	84	Jimmie Johnson	Legacy Motor Club	Chevrolet	0	1
39	34	77	Ty Dillon	Spire Motorsports	Chevrolet	0	1
Official race results

=== Race statistics ===
- Lead changes: 16 among 7 different drivers
- Cautions/Laps: 8 for 17 laps
- Red flags: 0
- Time of race: 3 hours, 30 minutes and 32 seconds
- Average speed: 72.886 miles per hour (117.299 km/h)

== Media ==
=== Television ===
Fox Sports covered the race on the television side. Mike Joy, Clint Bowyer, Kurt Busch, and Haas F1 Team Principal Guenther Steiner called the race from the broadcast booth and Chase Elliott called the race remotely. Jamie Little and Regan Smith handled pit road for the television side, and Larry McReynolds provided insight from the Fox Sports studio in Charlotte.

Fox
Booth announcers	Pit reporters	In-race analyst
Lap-by-lap: Mike Joy; Color-commentator: Clint Bowyer; Color-commentator: Kurt Busch; Color-commentator: Guenther Steiner; Color-commentator: Chase Elliott	Jamie Little; Regan Smith	Larry McReynolds

=== Radio ===
PRN had the radio call for the race which was simulcasted on Sirius XM NASCAR Radio.

PRN
Booth announcers	Turn announcers	Pit reporters
Lead announcer: Doug Rice; Announcer: Mark Garrow	Turn 1: Rob Albright; Turns 2 to Becketts: Doug Turnbull; Chapel to S do Senna: Mark Jaynes; To Sepang Hairpin: Nick Yeoman; Motodrom: Pat Patterson; Istanbul 8 to Turn 20: Brad Gillie	Wendy Venturini; Alan Cavanna; Brett McMillan

== Standings after the race ==
Drivers' Championship standings

	Pos	Driver	Points
2	1	Ross Chastain	211
5	2	Kyle Busch	192 (–19)
2	3	Joey Logano	186 (–25)
2	4	Kevin Harvick	186 (–25)
3	5	Christopher Bell	184 (–27)
2	6	Ryan Blaney	177 (–34)
4	7	Austin Cindric	166 (–45)
	8	Martin Truex Jr.	165 (–46)
4	9	Brad Keselowski	162 (–49)
5	10	Tyler Reddick	161 (–50)
2	11	Denny Hamlin	161 (–50)
	12	Ricky Stenhouse Jr.	159 (–52)
	13	Chris Buescher	157 (–54)
4	14	Daniel Suárez	144 (–67)
1	15	Corey LaJoie	139 (–72)
4	16	Alex Bowman	126 (–85)
Official driver's standings

Manufacturers' Championship standings

	Pos	Manufacturer	Points
	1	Chevrolet	228
1	2	Toyota	206 (–22)
1	3	Ford	204 (–24)

- Note: Only the first 16 positions are included for the driver standings.

Previous race: 2023 Ambetter Health 400	NASCAR Cup Series; 2023 season	Next race: 2023 Toyota Owners 400
