= Jonathan Wacks =

American film director

Jonathan Philip Wacks is an American film director, producer, and screenwriter.

He has directed a number of films including Powwow Highway, produced by George Harrison. The film won the Sundance Film Festival Filmmaker's Trophy, was nominated for four Independent Spirit Awards, and won awards for best picture, director, and actor at the American Indian Film Festival in San Francisco. In 2024, Powwow Highway was one of only 25 American films selected for inclusion in the Library of Congress Film Registry to be preserved for future generations.

Wacks' first film, Crossroads/South Africa (PBS), won a Student Academy Award in the documentary category. He then produced the acclaimed cult hit Repo Man, starring Emilio Estevez and Harry Dean Stanton, and directed Mystery Date (Orion), starring Ethan Hawke and Teri Polo, and Ed and His Dead Mother, starring Steve Buscemi and Ned Beatty. He also directed an array of TV productions including 21 Jump Street, with Johnny Depp, Sirens, and Going To Extremes.

Prior to his career as a director, Wacks served as vice president of production at the Samuel Goldwyn Company. He is a former chairman of the board of the Independent Feature Project/West (now Film Independent), the largest organization of independent filmmakers in America, and has served on the selection committee of the Writers' Program at the Sundance Institute. His work has been seen at numerous international film festivals, including Sundance, Montreal, Tokyo, Florence, London, Leipzig, Leeds, Cape Town, Deauville, New York, Munich, and Berlin.

Wacks has written several screenplays including Recoil, based on the Jim Thompson novel, No Cure for Love, My African Heart, Coldsleep Lullaby, and Stuck. He is the founding director of the Feirstein Graduate School of Cinema at the City University of New York (CUNY) and served as professor and chair. He also served as professor and chair of the Visual and Media Arts Department at Emerson College, head of the Film Department at the Vancouver Film School in British Columbia, and professor and chair of the Moving Image Arts Department at the College of Santa Fe. He was the director of Garson Studios in Santa Fe. Prior to that, he was a lecturer in sociology at the University of Cape Town, South Africa.

He is a member of the Directors Guild of America.

== Early life ==
Wacks was born in Johannesburg, South Africa, on July 4, 1948, to Harry and Sonya Wacks (née Feldman). He has an older brother Raymond Wacks and a younger sister Gillian Pires. He is married to Margaret McNally. They have two children, Daniel Luke Wacks and Anna Zoe Weitz. Daniel is married to Ellisa Glover Blackwell and lives in Oakland, California. They have a daughter, Maya and a son, Leo. Anna lives in San Diego, California and is married to Michael Weitz. They have two sons, Andrew and Jacob.

Wacks attended Greenside High School in Johannesburg and spent a year as an AFS exchange student at West Geauga High School in Ohio. He attended the University of the Witwatersrand majoring in philosophy before his departure to Jerusalem, where he spent a year at the Hebrew University. He completed a BA (Hons.) in Latin American Politics at the University of Essex, UK. He returned to South Africa in 1973 and taught sociology at the University of Cape Town. In 1977, he received a scholarship to attend UCLA Film School, where he graduated a Master of Fine Arts.

== Current position ==
Wacks is the founding director of the Barry R. Feirstein Graduate School of Cinema and professor in film at Brooklyn College.
