= Hervé Poncharal =

French motorsport manager (born 1957)

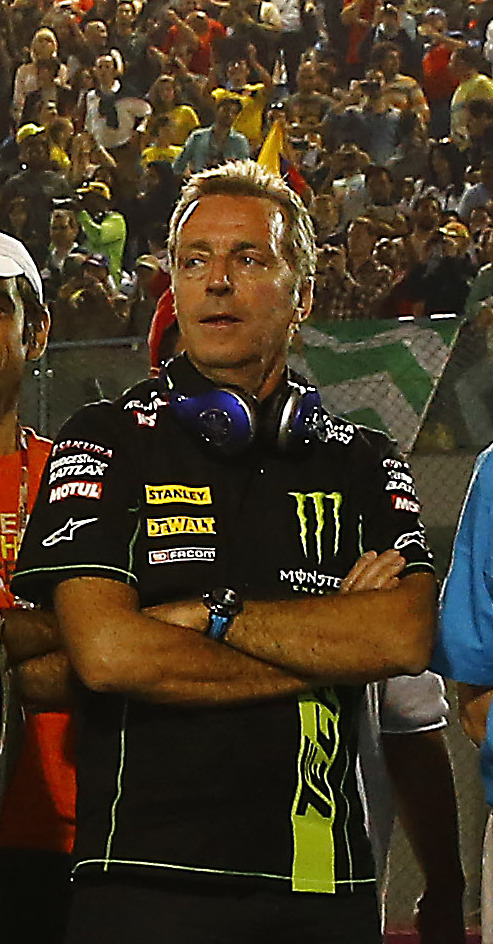
- Hervé Poncharal at the season opening ceremony 2015 in Losail
- Born: Hervé Gilles Poncharal; 10 April 1957 (age 69); Saint-Michel-sur-Orge, France
- Occupation: Motorsport team manager

Hervé Gilles Poncharal (born 10 April 1957) is a French former motorsport manager. He is the former owner and team principal of Red Bull KTM Tech3. He stepped away from Tech3 at the end of the 2025 season following the acquisition of the team by former Formula One team principal Guenther Steiner and his associates. He also served as the president of MotoGP teams' association International Road-Racing Teams Association (IRTA) for over 20 years, taking on the role from two-time 250cc world champion Sito Pons, he stepped down from the role in mid-2025.

== Career ==
Poncharal was a professional rider in his early years, and got his Grand Prix schooling in team management with Honda France from 1983 to 1988 as deputy director of the competition department, before taking the decision to form his own team.

In 1990 he founded Tech3, together with engineer Guy Coulon and Bernard Martignac, and the team began participating in the 250 cc class using Honda and Suzuki motorcycles. Hervé played multiple roles, including truck driver and cook, alongside managing a three-person team.

The team expanded over the years, winning the championship in 2000 and eventually entering MotoGP after initially competing in 250cc. Subsequently, the team ventured into Moto2 and Moto3, and more recently, MotoE, leading to the current structure with three teams and approximately 50 staff members encompassing various roles.

In 2020 Hervé celebrates his first ever premier-class win, when rider Miguel Oliveira won the Styrian Grand Prix in Austria.
