= David Steiner (lobbyist) =

American businessman and lobbyist

David S. Steiner
- Born: 1929; United States
- Died: October 23, 2023 (aged 93–94)
- Education: B.S. Carnegie Mellon University
- Occupation: Real estate developer
- Known for: CEO of the Steiner Equities Group, President of the American Israel Public Affairs Committee (AIPAC) and Commissioner of the Port Authority of New York & New Jersey
- Spouse: Sylvia Steiner
- Children: 4, Ellen Steiner Dolgin, Nancy Steiner, Douglas C. Steiner, and Jane Steiner Hoffman

David S. Steiner (1929 – October 23, 2023) was an American real estate developer in New Jersey and a former President of the American Israel Public Affairs Committee (AIPAC), who sat on the board of the National Jewish Democratic Council.

He was also the CEO of the Steiner Equities Group, that owned Steiner Studios, and was a commissioner of the Port Authority of New York & New Jersey.

== Early life ==
Steiner was born to a Jewish family and graduated from Carnegie Mellon University with a degree in civil engineering.

== Career ==
Steiner was a minority partner for over 40 years with Samuel Sudler, the chairman and President of Sudler Construction which was founded by his father Hyman Sudler in 1907. In 1996, after Sudler's death, Steiner who was a minority partner at the time, left Sudler and started Steiner Equities Group; and then created Steiner NYC as its New York arm. Originally focused on industrial real estate, he later re-directed its investments to commercial office parks and retail properties. In addition to development, the company also does property management, leasing and construction.

In December 1996, Steiner was a member of the New Jersey State Electoral College, one of 15 electors casting their votes for the Clinton/Gore ticket.

In 2003, he was appointed to the Board of Commissioners of the Port Authority of New York and New Jersey by New Jersey governor Jim McGreevey. He was reappointed by Governor Chris Christie in 2011.

== Controversy and resignation from AIPAC ==
He resigned his AIPAC Presidency in November 1992 after Haim Katz, a New York real estate developer, secretly recorded a telephone conversation with him and released it to The Washington Times. Steiner told Katz he had significant influence over American foreign policy and the selection of US political leaders.

Among the things Steiner told Katz:

I got, besides the $3 billion, you know they're looking for the Jewish votes, and I'll tell him whatever he wants to hear.... Besides the $10 billion in loan guarantees which was a fabulous thing, $3 billion in foreign, in military aid, and I got almost a billion dollars in other goodies that people don't even know about.... I have friends on the Clinton campaign, close associates.... I've known Bill for seven, eight years from the National Governors Association. I know him on a personal basis.... One of my friends is Hillary Clinton's scheduler, one of my officer's daughters works there. We gave two employees from AIPAC leave of absence to work on the campaign. I mean, we have a dozen people in the campaign, in the headquarters, in Little Rock, and they're all going to get big jobs.... I also work with a think tank, the Washington Institute. I have Michael Mandelbaum and Martin Indyk being foreign policy advisers... Steve Spiegel.... We have Bill Clinton's ear. I talked to Bill Clinton. He's going to be very good for us.... A girl who worked for me at AIPAC stood up for them at their wedding. Hillary lived with her. I mean we have those relationships.... Susan Thomases, who's in there, worked with me on the Bradley campaign. We worked together for 13 years. She's in there with the family. They stay with her when they come to New York. One of my officers, Monte Friedkin, is one of the biggest fund-raisers for them. I mean, I have people like that all over the country.... He's said he's going to help us. He's got something in his heart for the Jews, he has Jewish friends.... Clinton is the best guy for us.... We're just negotiating. We're more interested right now in the secretary of state and the secretary of National Security Agency.... I've got a list. But I really can't go through it. I'm not allowed to talk about it.... We'll have access.

After the transcript of the recording was made public, Steiner and AIPAC claimed he had exaggerated. "In an effort to encourage and impress what I thought was a potential political activist calling on the telephone," Steiner said, "I made statements which went beyond over-zealousness and exaggeration and were simply and totally untrue. I apologize to Governor Clinton, Chief of Staff Baker, and AIPAC for these actions."

Steiner was replaced as President of AIPAC by Steve Grossman.

== Philanthropy ==
Steiner supported a number of Jewish causes including the United Jewish Communities of MetroWest NJ, the Rachel Coalition, and the National Yiddish Book Center where he funded the Steiner Summer Internship Program.

== Personal life ==
He was married to Sylvia Steiner and they had four children together: Ellen Sue Steiner Dolgin, Nancy Steiner, Douglas C. Steiner, and Jane Steiner Hoffman.
