= Tech3 =

Motorcycle racing team

- 2026 name: MotoGP: Red Bull KTM Tech3; Moto3: Red Bull KTM Tech3
- Base: Bormes Les Mimosas, France
- Principal: Hervé Poncharal; Guenther Steiner (CEO)
- Rider(s): MotoGP: 12. Maverick Viñales; 23. Enea Bastianini; Moto3: 27. Rico Salmela; 73. Valentín Perrone
- Motorcycle: MotoGP: KTM RC16; Moto3: KTM RC250GP
- Tyres: MotoGP: Michelin; Moto3: Pirelli
- Riders' Championships: 250cc: 2000: Olivier Jacque

Tech3 is a motorcycle racing team competing in the MotoGP™ and Moto3™ World Championships. Founded in 1990 by Hervé Poncharal, the team has competed in multiple classes of Grand Prix motorcycle racing and is one of the longest-standing independent teams in the premier class. As of the 2020s, Tech3 operates as a satellite team for KTM under the name Red Bull KTM Tech3. In 2025, a consortium led by Guenther Steiner acquired full ownership of the team, marking a new era beginning in 2026.

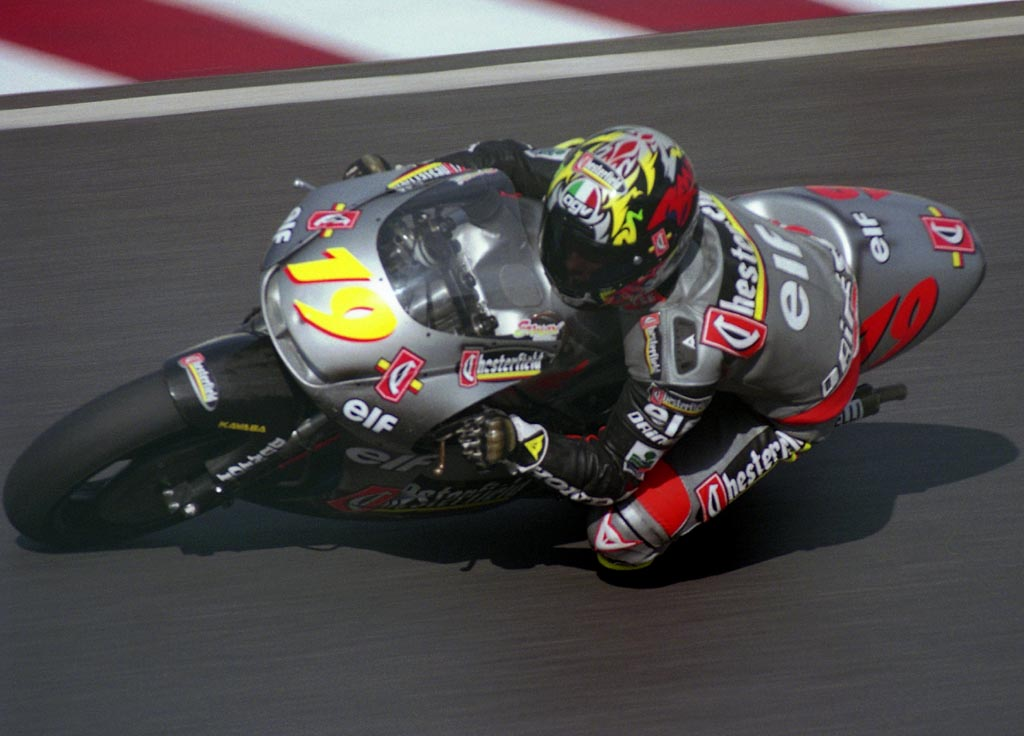
Olivier Jacque at the 1996 Japanese Grand Prix

== History ==
The team was founded in 1990 by ex-racer Hervé Poncharal, engineer Guy Coulon, and Bernard Martignac, initially racing in the 250 cc class using Honda and Suzuki motorcycles. The team achieved major success at the end of the decade, culminating in the 2000 season when riders Olivier Jacque and Shinya Nakano finished first and second respectively in the 250cc World Championship.

=== Partnership with Yamaha ===
In the 1999 season, Tech3 partnered with Yamaha and became a long-term satellite team. In the 2001 season the team moved the whole operation to the premier class, again with Yamaha, Jacque, and Nakano on the YZR500.

Over nearly two decades, the team established itself as one of the leading independent outfits in MotoGP, achieving multiple podium finishes and consistently placing among the top non-factory teams.

Towards the end of the 2002 season, the team was given use of the YZR-M1, marking an important step in its development. Changes continued both technically and competitively. During the 2006 and 2007 seasons, Tech3 ran on Dunlop tyres before returning to Michelin in 2008. That same year, the rider line-up feature reigning two-time Superbike World Champion James Toseland alongside fellow two-time Champion Colin Edwards, forming a highly experienced pairing.

Further changes came in 2010 when Ben Spies replaced Toseland. Spies enjoyed a strong debut season with the team, finishing sixth in the championship, while Edwards placed eleventh. At the same time, the team expanded its presence into the newly introduced Moto2 category, where Tech3 riders Yuki Takahashi and Raffaele De Rosa competed on Honda-powered machines using a Tech3 chassis, finishing twelfth and twenty-seventh respectively.

Ahead of the 2011 season, Spies moved up to the factory Yamaha team and was replaced by Cal Crutchlow, while Edwards remained with the team for a fourth consecutive year, providing continuity and experience. In 2012, Crutchlow entered the second year of his contract, but further changes followed as Edwards announced his departure to join Forward Racing. He was replaced by Andrea Dovizioso, signalling another shift in the team’s rider lineup. Shortly afterwards, Bradley Smith signed a deal to compete in MotoGP with the team for the 2013 and 2014 seasons, continuing the team’s pattern of evolving talent and maintaining a competitive presence.

=== Partnership with KTM ===
In 2019, Tech3 ended its partnership with Yamaha and became the official satellite team for KTM. The move marked a significant strategic shift, aligning the team with KTM’s expanding MotoGP project.

This announcement also affected Tech3's Moto2 programme, as they switched to KTM chassis.

In mid-2018, Tech3 also confirmed they would be entering the inaugural season of the MotoE World Cup in 2019.

After the 2019 season in Moto2, with KTM withdrawing from the series, for 2020 Tech3 will field a two-rider team in the Moto3 class for the first time, also using KTM machinery.

In the 2020 season, Tech3 recorded their first ever premier-class win in their 373rd start at the Styrian Grand Prix in Austria, KTM's home event. The race was won by Miguel Oliveira. Rider and team repeated the feat at the final race of the season in Portugal, Oliviera's home race.

=== Partnership with Gas Gas ===
In mid-2022, Tech3 announced their partnership with Spanish motorcycle manufacturer Gas Gas, KTM's sister brand. The deal saw Tech3 carry Gas Gas's crimson red color from 2023 onwards.

Tech3 continued their partnership with KTM in the Moto3 class in that season before also switching to GasGas for 2024.

On 13 June 2024, Tech3 announced that they would revert to a Factory KTM team alongside the Red Bull KTM Squad. The team would be rebranded as Red Bull KTM Tech3. They also announced Enea Bastianini and Maverick Vinales as their riders for 2025.

== Recently ==
In May of 2026, Tech3 announced a multi-year agreement with KTM to carry on in its role as the Austrian manufacturer's satellite team in the MotoGP World Championship from 2027. A key extension of KTM's factory effort, Tech3 will continue to benefit from factory-supported machinery and technical collaboration as MotoGP heads into the new technical regulations of 2027.

== Grand Prix motorcycle results ==
=== By rider ===
Year	Class	Team name	Bike	Riders	Races	Wins	Podiums	Poles	F. laps	Points	Pos.
2022	MotoGP	Tech3 KTM Factory Racing	RC16	(Spain) Raúl Fernández	18	0	0	0	0	14	22nd
2022	MotoGP	Tech3 KTM Factory Racing	RC16	(Australia) Remy Gardner	20	0	0	0	0	13	23rd
2022	Moto3	Red Bull KTM Tech3	RC250GP	(Turkey) Deniz Öncü	20	0	3	3	4	200	5th
2022	Moto3	Red Bull KTM Tech3	RC250GP	(Spain) Adrián Fernández	19	0	0	0	0	51	20th
2022	MotoE	Tech3 E-Racing	Energica Ego	(Spain) Héctor Garzó	12	0	0	0	1	86	8th
2022	MotoE	Tech3 E-Racing	Energica Ego	(Spain) Alex Escrig	12	0	0	0	0	79	9th
2023	MotoGP	GasGas Factory Racing Tech3	RC16	(Spain) Augusto Fernández	20	0	0	0	0	71	17th
2023	MotoGP	GasGas Factory Racing Tech3	RC16	(Spain) Pol Espargaró	12	0	0	0	0	15	23rd
2023	MotoGP	GasGas Factory Racing Tech3	RC16	(Germany) Jonas Folger	6	0	0	0	0	9	25th
2023	Moto3	Red Bull KTM Tech3	RC250GP	(Italy) Filippo Farioli	20	0	0	0	0	15	25th
2023	Moto3	Red Bull KTM Tech3	RC250GP	(Spain) Daniel Holgado	20	3	7	1	2	220	5th
2023	MotoE	Tech3 E-Racing	V21L	(Italy) Alessandro Zaccone	16	0	0	0	0	104	11th
2023	MotoE	Tech3 E-Racing	V21L	(Japan) Hikari Okubo	16	0	0	0	0	79	13th
2024	MotoGP	GasGas Factory Racing Tech3	RC16	(Spain) Pedro Acosta	20	0	5	1	2	215	6th
2024	MotoGP	GasGas Factory Racing Tech3	RC16	(Spain) Augusto Fernández	20	0	0	0	0	27	20th
2024	Moto3	Red Bull GasGas Tech3	RC250GP	(Australia) Jacob Roulstone	20	0	0	0	0	66	15th
2024	Moto3	Red Bull GasGas Tech3	RC250GP	(Spain) Daniel Holgado	20	1	8	1	3	256	2nd
2024	MotoE	Tech3 E-Racing	V21L	(Italy) Nicholas Spinelli	16	3	5	0	2	149	7th
2024	MotoE	Tech3 E-Racing	V21L	(Italy) Alessandro Zaccone	16	1	5	6	2	179	5th
2025	MotoGP	Red Bull KTM Tech3	RC16	(Spain) Maverick Viñales	15	0	0	0	0	72	18th
2025	MotoGP	Red Bull KTM Tech3	RC16	(Italy) Enea Bastianini	21	0	1	0	0	112	14th
2025	MotoGP	Red Bull KTM Tech3	RC16	(Spain) Pol Espargaró	5	0	0	0	0	29	22nd
2025	Moto3	Red Bull KTM Tech3	RC250GP	(Australia) Jacob Roulstone	18	0	0	0	0	61	16th
2025	Moto3	Red Bull KTM Tech3	RC250GP	(Spain) Joel Esteban	3	0	0	0	0	20 (33)	19th
2025	Moto3	Red Bull KTM Tech3	RC250GP	(Argentina) Valentín Perrone	21	0	2	2	1	134	10th
2026	MotoGP	Red Bull KTM Tech3	RC16	(Spain) Maverick Viñales	12	0	0	0	0	17*	23rd*
2026	MotoGP	Red Bull KTM Tech3	RC16	(Italy) Enea Bastianini	19	0	0	0	0	147*	10th*
2026	MotoGP	Red Bull KTM Tech3	RC16	(Germany) Jonas Folger	1	0	0	0	0	0*	30th*
2026	MotoGP	Red Bull KTM Tech3	RC16	(Spain) Pol Espargaró	4	0	0	0	0	5*	25th*
2026	Moto3	Red Bull KTM Tech3	RC250GP	(Finland) Rico Salmela	19	0	0	0	0	93*	11th*
2026	Moto3	Red Bull KTM Tech3	RC250GP	(Argentina) Valentín Perrone	19	0	2	1	1	121*	9th*

=== By year ===
(key) (Races in bold indicate pole position; races in italics indicate fastest lap)

Season	Class	Team	Machine	No	Rider	1	2	3	4	5	6	7	8	9	10	11	12	13	14	15	16	17	18	19	20	R.C.	Points	T.C.	Points	M.C.	Points
2000	250cc	Chesterfield Yamaha Tech 3	YZR250	19	(France) Olivier Jacque	RSA; 4	MAL; 2	JPN; 4	ESP; 4	FRA; 3	ITA; 2	CAT; 1	NED; 2	**GBR**; 2	**GER**; 1	**CZE**; 3	**POR**; 2	**VAL**; 2	RIO; Ret	PAC; 4	AUS; 1					1st	279	–		1st	342
2000	250cc	Chesterfield Yamaha Tech 3	YZR250	56	(Japan) Shinya Nakano	**RSA**; 1	MAL; 1	JPN; 3	ESP; 15	FRA; 2	ITA; 1	**CAT**; 3	NED; 3	GBR; 7	GER; 3	CZE; 1	POR; Ret	VAL; 1	RIO; 4	PAC; 2	**AUS**; 2					2nd	272	–		1st	342
2001	500cc	Gauloises Yamaha Tech 3	YZR500	19	(France) Olivier Jacque	JPN; Ret	RSA; 16	ESP; Ret	FRA; Ret	ITA	CAT; 12	NED; 11	GBR; 9	GER; 6	CZE; 12	POR; 8	VAL; 5	PAC; Ret	AUS; 6	MAL; Ret	RIO; Ret					15th	59	–		2nd	295
2001	500cc	Gauloises Yamaha Tech 3	YZR500	56	(Japan) Shinya Nakano	JPN; 5	RSA; 4	ESP; 4	FRA; 11	ITA; 8	CAT; 4	NED; 5	GBR; 6	GER; 3	CZE; DNS	POR; 9	VAL; 7	PAC; 6	AUS; 7	MAL; 4	RIO; 9					5th	155	–		2nd	295
2002	MotoGP	Gauloises Yamaha Tech 3	YZR500	19	(France) Olivier Jacque	JPN; Ret	RSA; 6	ESP; 11	FRA; Ret	ITA; 9	CAT; 9	NED; 14	GBR; 5	**GER**; Ret	CZE; 10	POR; Ret	RIO; 7	PAC; 7								10th	81	5th	149	2nd	272
2002	MotoGP	Gauloises Yamaha Tech 3	YZR-M1	19	(France) Olivier Jacque														MAL; Ret	AUS; 8	VAL; 9					10th	81	5th	149	2nd	272
2002	MotoGP	Gauloises Yamaha Tech 3	YZR500	56	(Japan) Shinya Nakano	JPN; Ret	RSA; 8	ESP; 17	FRA; 13	ITA; 11	CAT; Ret	NED; 8	GBR; 10	GER; 5	CZE; Ret	POR; 12	RIO; Ret	PAC; 16								11th	68	5th	149	2nd	272
2002	MotoGP	Gauloises Yamaha Tech 3	YZR-M1	56	(Japan) Shinya Nakano														MAL; 6	AUS; 13	VAL; 6					11th	68	5th	149	2nd	272
2003	MotoGP	Gauloises Yamaha Team	YZR-M1	4	(Brazil) Alex Barros	JPN; 8	RSA; 5	ESP; 5	FRA; 3	ITA; Ret	CAT; 8	NED; 8	GBR	GER; Ret	CZE; 7	POR; 11	RIO; 12	PAC; 6	MAL; 15	AUS; Ret	VAL; 6					9th	101	6th	172	3rd	175
2003	MotoGP	Gauloises Yamaha Team	YZR-M1	19	(France) Olivier Jacque	JPN; 15	RSA; 10	ESP; 10	FRA; 4	ITA; 10	CAT; Ret	NED; 5	GBR; Ret	GER; 9	CZE; 11	POR; 13	RIO; Ret	PAC; 13	MAL; DNS	AUS; 6	VAL; Ret					12th	71	6th	172	3rd	175
2004	MotoGP	Fortuna Gauloises Yamaha Tech 3	YZR-M1	17	(Japan) Norifumi Abe	RSA; 9	ESP; 11	FRA; Ret	ITA; 7	CAT; 9	NED; 11	RIO; 8	GER; Ret	GBR; Ret	CZE; 8	POR; 10	JPN; Ret	QAT; 7	MAL; 12	AUS; 17	VAL; 10					13th	74	6th	149	2nd	328
2004	MotoGP	Fortuna Gauloises Yamaha Tech 3	YZR-M1	33	(Italy) Marco Melandri	RSA; 11	SPA; Ret	FRA; 6	ITA; 9	CAT; 3	NED; 3	RIO; 13	GER; Ret	GBR	CZE; 9	POR; Ret	JPN; 5	QAT; Ret	MAL; Ret	AUS; Ret	VAL; Ret					12th	75	6th	149	2nd	328
2005	MotoGP	Fortuna Yamaha Team	YZR-M1	11	(Spain) Rubén Xaus	SPA; 18	POR; 10	CHN; 10	FRA; 12	ITA; 14	CAT; 10	NED; 12	USA; 11	GBR; Ret	GER; 13	CZE; 18	JPN; 10	MAL; 15	QAT; 14	AUS; 12	TUR; 14	VAL; 15				16th	52	7th	130	1st	381
2005	MotoGP	Fortuna Yamaha Team	YZR-M1	24	(Spain) Toni Elías	SPA; 12	POR; 14	CHN; 14	FRA; 9	ITA	CAT	NED	USA; 13	GBR; 9	GER; 12	CZE; 14	JPN; 9	MAL; 11	QAT; 8	AUS; 9	TUR; 6	VAL; 10				12th	74	7th	130	1st	381
2005	MotoGP	Fortuna Yamaha Team	YZR-M1	94	(Spain) David Checa	SPA	POR	CHN	FRA	ITA; 19	CAT; 13	NED; 15	USA	GBR	GER	CZE	JPN	MAL	QAT	AUS	TUR	VAL				26th	4	7th	130	1st	381
2006	MotoGP	Tech 3 Yamaha	YZR-M1	7	(Spain) Carlos Checa	SPA; 13	QAT; 12	TUR; 15	CHN; 14	FRA; 11	ITA; 15	CAT; 8	NED; 9	GBR; 10	GER; 9	USA; 7	CZE; 15	MAL; 12	AUS; Ret	JPN; 14	POR; 7	VAL; 10				15th	75	9th	101	2nd	289
2006	MotoGP	Tech 3 Yamaha	YZR-M1	77	(United Kingdom) James Ellison	SPA; 16	QAT; 13	TUR; 18	CHN; 16	FRA; 14	ITA; 16	CAT; 9	NED; Ret	GBR; 14	GER; 13	USA; 13	CZE; 17	MAL; 16	AUS; 16	JPN; 15	POR; 13	VAL; 14				18th	26	9th	101	2nd	289
2007	MotoGP	Dunlop Yamaha Tech 3	YZR-M1	6	(Japan) Makoto Tamada	QAT; 16	SPA; 14	TUR; 14	CHN; Ret	FRA; 9	ITA; 15	CAT; 12	GBR; 15	NED; 13	GER; 13	USA; 8	CZE; 17	RSM; 14	POR; Ret	JPN; 12	AUS; 16	MAL; 18	VAL; 15			18th	38	8th	88	3rd	283
2007	MotoGP	Dunlop Yamaha Tech 3	YZR-M1	50	(France) Sylvain Guintoli	QAT; 15	SPA; 15	TUR; 15	CHN; 13	FRA; 10	ITA; 14	CAT; 14	GBR; 16	NED; 14	GER; Ret	USA; 13	CZE; 13	RSM; 12	POR; 14	JPN; 4	AUS; 14	MAL; 19	VAL; 11			16th	50	8th	88	3rd	283
2008	MotoGP	Tech 3 Yamaha	YZR-M1	5	(United States) Colin Edwards	QAT; 7	SPA; Ret	POR; 4	**CHN**; 7	FRA; 3	ITA; 5	CAT; 5	GBR; 4	NED; 3	GER; Ret	USA; 14	CZE; 14	RSM; 10	IND; 15	JPN; 7	AUS; 8	MAL; 8	VAL; 6			7th	144	4th	249	1st	402
2008	MotoGP	Tech 3 Yamaha	YZR-M1	52	(United Kingdom) James Toseland	QAT; 6	SPA; 6	POR; 7	CHN; 12	FRA; Ret	ITA; 6	CAT; 6	GBR; 17	NED; 9	GER; 11	USA; 9	CZE; 13	SMR; 6	IND; 18	JPN; 11	AUS; 6	MAL; Ret	VAL; 11			11th	105	4th	249	1st	402
2009	MotoGP	Monster Yamaha Tech 3	YZR-M1	5	(United States) Colin Edwards	QAT; 4	JPN; 12	SPA; 7	FRA; 7	ITA; 6	CAT; 7	NED; 4	USA; 7	GER; 9	GBR; 2	CZE; 7	IND; 5	RSM; Ret	POR; 5	AUS; 5	MAL; 13	VAL; 4				5th	161	4th	253	1st	386
2009	MotoGP	Monster Yamaha Tech 3	YZR-M1	52	(United Kingdom) James Toseland	QAT; 16	JPN; 9	SPA; 13	FRA; 9	ITA; 7	CAT; 13	NED; 6	USA; DSQ	GER; 10	GBR; 6	CZE; 9	IND; 6	SMR; 10	POR; 9	AUS; 14	MAL; 15	VAL; 12				14th	92	4th	253	1st	386
2010	MotoGP	Monster Yamaha Tech 3	YZR-M1	5	(United States) Colin Edwards	QAT; 8	SPA; 12	FRA; 12	ITA; 13	GBR; 9	NED; 8	CAT; 11	GER; Ret	USA; 7	CZE; 7	IND; Ret	RSM; 7	ARA; 12	JPN; 5	MAL; NC	AUS; 7	POR; 7	VAL; 12			11th	103	4th	279	1st	404
2010	MotoGP	Monster Yamaha Tech 3	YZR-M1	11	(United States) Ben Spies	QAT; 5	SPA; Ret	FRA; Ret	ITA; 7	GBR; 3	NED; 4	CAT; 6	GER; 8	USA; 6	CZE; 4	**IND**; 2	RSM; 6	ARA; 5	JPN; 8	MAL; 4	AUS; 5	POR; DNS	VAL; 4			6th	176	4th	279	1st	404
2010	Moto2	Tech 3 Racing	Tech 3 Mistral 610	35	(Italy) Raffaele De Rosa	QAT; Ret	SPA; 20	FRA; Ret	ITA; Ret	GBR; 28	NED; 27	CAT; 16	GER; Ret		CZE; 15	IND; Ret	RSM; 13	ARA; Ret	JPN; 15	MAL; Ret	AUS; 16	POR; 6	VAL; 24			27th	15	–		6th	99
2010	Moto2	Tech 3 Racing	Tech 3 Mistral 610	72	(Japan) Yuki Takahashi	QAT; Ret	SPA; 4	FRA; Ret	ITA; 8	GBR; 18	NED; 10	CAT; 1	GER; Ret		CZE; 2	IND; 26	RSM; Ret	ARA; 12	JPN; 6	MAL; Ret	AUS; 17	POR; 26	VAL; 18			12th	86	–		6th	99
2011	MotoGP	Monster Yamaha Tech 3	YZR-M1	5	(United States) Colin Edwards	QAT; 8	SPA; Ret	POR; 6	FRA; 13	CAT; DNS	GBR; 3	NED; 7	ITA; 9	GER; 10	USA; 8	CZE; 8	IND; 7	RSM; 13	ARA; 13	JPN; 8	AUS; 5	MAL; C	VAL			9th	109	5th	188	2nd	325
2011	MotoGP	Monster Yamaha Tech 3	YZR-M1	35	(United Kingdom) Cal Crutchlow	QAT; 11	SPA; 8	POR; 8	FRA; Ret	CAT; 7	GBR; DNS	NED; 14	ITA; Ret	GER; 14	USA; Ret	CZE; Ret	IND; 11	RSM; 10	ARA; 9	JPN; 11	AUS; Ret	MAL; C	VAL; 4			12th	70	5th	188	2nd	325
2011	MotoGP	Monster Yamaha Tech 3	YZR-M1	41	(United States) Josh Hayes	QAT	SPA	POR	FRA	CAT	GBR	NED	ITA	GER	USA	CZE	IND	RSM	ARA	JPN	AUS	MAL	VAL; 7			19th	9	5th	188	2nd	325
2011	Moto2	Tech 3 Racing	Tech 3 Mistral 610	19	(Belgium) Xavier Siméon	QAT; 25	SPA; 19	POR; 26	FRA; 18	CAT; 14	GBR; Ret	NED; Ret	ITA; 12	GER; 18		CZE; 23	IND; 13	RSM; Ret	ARA; 18	JPN; 11	AUS; Ret	MAL; 15	VAL; 8			26th	23	–		5th	149
2011	Moto2	Tech 3 Racing	Tech 3 Mistral 610	38	(United Kingdom) Bradley Smith	QAT; 9	SPA; 4	POR; 29	FRA; 9	CAT; 19	GBR; 2	NED; 3	ITA; 3	GER; Ret		CZE; Ret	IND; 4	RSM; 6	ARA; 6	JPN; 7	AUS; 18	MAL; DNS	VAL; 23			7th	121	–		5th	149
2011	Moto2	Tech 3 Racing	Tech 3 Mistral 610	63	(France) Mike Di Meglio	QAT; 19	SPA; 26	POR; 9	FRA; Ret	CAT; Ret	GBR; 17	NED; Ret	ITA; 24	GER; 16		CZE; 15	IND; 27	RSM; 16	ARA; 12	JPN; 27	AUS; 9	MAL; 14	VAL; 7			23rd	30	–		5th	149
2012	MotoGP	Monster Yamaha Tech 3	YZR-M1	4	(Italy) Andrea Dovizioso	QAT; 5	SPA; 5	POR; 4	FRA; 7	CAT; 3	GBR; 19	NED; 3	GER; 3	ITA; 3	USA; 4	IND; 3	CZE; 4	RSM; 4	ARA; 3	JPN; 4	MAL; 13	AUS; 4	VAL; 6			4th	218	**3rd**	**369**	2nd	386
2012	MotoGP	Monster Yamaha Tech 3	YZR-M1	35	(United Kingdom) Cal Crutchlow	QAT; 4	SPA; 4	POR; 5	FRA; 8	CAT; 5	GBR; 6	NED; 5	GER; 8	ITA; 6	USA; 5	IND; Ret	CZE; 3	RSM; Ret	ARA; 4	JPN; Ret	MAL; Ret	AUS; 3	VAL; Ret			7th	151	**3rd**	**369**	2nd	386
2012	Moto2	Tech 3 Racing	Tech 3 Mistral 610	19	(Belgium) Xavier Siméon	QAT; 17	SPA; 13	POR; 13	FRA; DNS	CAT	GBR; 21	NED; 13	GER; 8	ITA; Ret		IND; Ret	CZE; Ret	RSM; Ret	ARA; Ret	JPN; 13	MAL; Ret	AUS; 13	VAL; 27			21st	23	–		5th	115
2012	Moto2	Tech 3 Racing	Tech 3 Mistral 610	38	(United Kingdom) Bradley Smith	QAT; 9	SPA; 11	POR; 10	FRA; 9	CAT; 12	GBR; 7	NED; 6	GER; 7	ITA; 4		IND; 15	CZE; 8	RSM; 8	ARA; 5	JPN; Ret	MAL; 7	AUS; 11	VAL; 16			9th	112	–		5th	115
2012	Moto2	Tech 3 Racing	Tech 3 Mistral 610	81	(Spain) Jordi Torres	QAT	SPA	POR	FRA	CAT; 16	GBR	NED	GER	ITA		IND	CZE	RSM	ARA	JPN	MAL	AUS	VAL			19th	0 (31) (Note: Non-bracketed number refers to the number accumulated with team, with number in brackets referring to the total accumulated for the season.)	–		5th	115
2013	MotoGP	Monster Yamaha Tech 3	YZR-M1	35	(United Kingdom) Cal Crutchlow	QAT; 5	AME; 4	SPA; 5	FRA; 2	ITA; 3	CAT; Ret	**NED**; 3	GER; 2	USA; 7	IND; 5	**CZE**; 17	GBR; 7	RSM; 6	ARA; 6	MAL; 6	AUS; 4	JPN; 7	VAL; Ret			5th	188	**3rd**	**304**	2nd	381
2013	MotoGP	Monster Yamaha Tech 3	YZR-M1	38	(United Kingdom) Bradley Smith	QAT; Ret	AME; 12	SPA; 10	FRA; 9	ITA; 9	CAT; 6	NED; 9	GER; 6	USA; Ret	IND; 8	CZE; Ret	GBR; 9	RSM; 11	ARA; 7	MAL; 7	AUS; 6	JPN; 8	VAL; 7			10th	116	**3rd**	**304**	2nd	381
2013	Moto2	Tech 3	Tech 3 Mistral 610	52	(United Kingdom) Danny Kent	QAT; 18	AME; 17	SPA; 26	FRA; 15	ITA; 21	CAT; 13	NED; 19	GER; Ret		IND; 22	CZE; 12	GBR; 18	RSM; 18	ARA; 15	MAL; 12	AUS; 13	JPN; DNS	VAL			22nd	16	–		4th	21
2013	Moto2	Tech 3	Tech 3 Mistral 610	96	(France) Louis Rossi	QAT; Ret	AME; 23	SPA; 24	FRA; 14	ITA; 25	CAT; Ret	NED; 12	GER; 21		IND; 23	CZE; 19	GBR; 23	RSM; 19	ARA; 18	MAL; 16	AUS; Ret	JPN; Ret	VAL; 23			24th	6	–		4th	21
2013	Moto2	Tech 3	Tech 3 Mistral 610	99	(France) Lucas Mahias	QAT	AME	SPA	FRA	ITA	CAT	NED	GER		IND	CZE	GBR	RSM	ARA	MAL	AUS	JPN	VAL; 24			NC	0	–		4th	21
2013	Moto2	Singha Eneos Yamaha Tech 3	Tech 3 Mistral 610	46	(Thailand) Decha Kraisart	QAT	AME	SPA	FRA	ITA	CAT	NED	GER		IND	CZE	GBR	RSM	ARA	MAL; Ret	AUS	JPN; 21	VAL			NC	0	–		4th	21
2014	MotoGP	Monster Yamaha Tech 3	YZR-M1	38	(United Kingdom) Bradley Smith	QAT; Ret	AME; 5	ARG; 7	SPA; 8	FRA; 10	ITA; Ret	CAT; 10	NED; 8	GER; 19	IND; 6	CZE; 9	GBR; 22	RSM; 7	ARA; 5	JPN; 9	AUS; 3	MAL; 5	VAL; 14			8th	121	4th	257	2nd	354
2014	MotoGP	Monster Yamaha Tech 3	YZR-M1	44	(Spain) Pol Espargaró	QAT; Ret	AME; 6	ARG; 8	SPA; 9	FRA; 4	ITA; 5	CAT; 7	NED; Ret	GER; 7	IND; 5	CZE; Ret	GBR; 6	RSM; 6	ARA; 6	JPN; 8	AUS; Ret	MAL; 6	VAL; 6			6th	136	4th	257	2nd	354
2014	Moto2	Tech 3	Tech 3 Mistral 610	23	(Germany) Marcel Schrötter	QAT; Ret	AME; 9	ARG; 11	SPA; Ret	FRA; 11	ITA; 12	CAT; 9	NED; 12	GER; 12	IND; 14	CZE; 10	GBR; 14	RSM; 11	ARA; 10	JPN; 29	AUS; 7	MAL; 10	VAL; 8			10th	80	–		5th	97
2014	Moto2	Tech 3	Tech 3 Mistral 610	88	(Spain) Ricard Cardús	QAT; 12	AME; 10	ARG; Ret	SPA; 13	FRA; 26	ITA; 19	CAT; 7	NED; 16	GER; 11	IND; 15	CZE; 20	GBR; 16	RSM; Ret	ARA; 14	JPN; 9	AUS; 16	MAL; 12	VAL; 12			18th	45	–		5th	97
2014	Moto2	Singha Eneos Yamaha Tech 3	Tech 3 Mistral 610	46	(Thailand) Decha Kraisart	QAT	AME	ARG	SPA	FRA	ITA	CAT	NED	GER	IND	CZE	GBR	RSM	ARA	JPN	AUS	MAL; 25	VAL			NC	0	–		5th	97
2014	Moto2	Singha Eneos Yamaha Tech 3	Tech 3 Mistral 610	65	(Thailand) Chalermpol Polamai	QAT	AME	ARG	SPA	FRA	ITA	CAT	NED	GER	IND	CZE	GBR	RSM	ARA	JPN; 30	AUS	MAL	VAL			NC	0	–		5th	97
2015	MotoGP	Monster Yamaha Tech 3	YZR-M1	38	(United Kingdom) Bradley Smith	QAT; 8	AME; 6	ARG; 6	SPA; 8	FRA; 6	ITA; 5	CAT; 5	NED; 7	GER; 6	IND; 6	CZE; 7	GBR; 7	RSM; 2	ARA; 8	JPN; 7	AUS; 10	MAL; 4	VAL; 6			6th	181	4th	295	1st	407
2015	MotoGP	Monster Yamaha Tech 3	YZR-M1	44	(Spain) Pol Espargaró	QAT; 9	AME; Ret	ARG; 8	SPA; 5	FRA; 7	ITA; 6	CAT; Ret	NED; 5	GER; 8	IND; 7	CZE; 8	GBR; Ret	RSM; Ret	ARA; 9	JPN; Ret	AUS; 8	MAL; 9	VAL; 5			9th	114	4th	295	1st	407
2015	Moto2	Tech 3	Tech 3 Mistral 610	23	(Germany) Marcel Schrötter	QAT; 16	AME; 13	ARG; 16	SPA; 10	FRA; 13	ITA; 16	CAT; 16	NED; 18	GER; Ret	IND; 14	CZE; 19	GBR; 11	RSM; 17	ARA; 15	JPN; 9	AUS; 12	MAL; Ret	VAL; 15			20th	32	–		3rd	39
2015	Moto2	Tech 3	Tech 3 Mistral 610	88	(Spain) Ricard Cardús	QAT; Ret	AME; 17	ARG; 18	SPA; Ret	FRA; 16	ITA; 17	CAT; Ret	NED; Ret	GER; 19	IND	CZE	GBR	RSM	ARA	JPN	AUS	MAL	VAL			24th	0 (20)	–		3rd	39
2015	Moto2	Tech 3	Tech 3 Mistral 610	97	(Spain) Xavi Vierge	QAT	AME	ARG	SPA	FRA	ITA	CAT	NED	GER	IND; Ret	CZE; Ret	GBR; 22	RSM; 23	ARA; 16	JPN; Ret	AUS; 19	MAL; 22	VAL; 17			NC	0	–		3rd	39
2016	MotoGP	Monster Yamaha Tech 3	YZR-M1	22	(United Kingdom) Alex Lowes	QAT	ARG	AME	SPA	FRA	ITA	CAT	NED	GER	AUT	CZE	GBR; 13	RSM; Ret	ARA; DNS	JPN	AUS	MAL	VAL			24th	3	5th	199	2nd	353
2016	MotoGP	Monster Yamaha Tech 3	YZR-M1	38	(United Kingdom) Bradley Smith	QAT; 8	ARG; 8	AME; 17	SPA; 12	FRA; Ret	ITA; 7	CAT; Ret	NED; 13	GER; 13	AUT; 9	CZE; Ret	GBR	RSM	ARA	JPN; 13	AUS; 8	MAL; 14	VAL; 9			17th	62	5th	199	2nd	353
2016	MotoGP	Monster Yamaha Tech 3	YZR-M1	44	(Spain) Pol Espargaró	QAT; 7	ARG; 6	AME; 7	SPA; 8	FRA; 5	ITA; 15	CAT; 5	NED; 4	GER; Ret	AUT; 10	CZE; 13	GBR; DNS	RSM; 9	ARA; 8	JPN; 6	AUS; 5	MAL; 9	VAL; 6			8th	134	5th	199	2nd	353
2016	Moto2	Tech 3 Racing	Tech 3 Mistral 610	32	(Spain) Isaac Viñales	QAT; 19	ARG; 24	AME; 18	SPA; 13	FRA; 20	ITA; 24	CAT; 16	NED; 21	GER; 9	AUT; 18	CZE; 14	GBR; Ret	RSM; Ret	ARA; 28	JPN; 15	AUS; DNS	MAL; 10	VAL; Ret			24th	19	–		3rd	47
2016	Moto2	Tech 3 Racing	Tech 3 Mistral 610	97	(Spain) Xavi Vierge	QAT; Ret	ARG; 14	AME; 20	SPA; Ret	FRA; 15	ITA; Ret	CAT; 20	NED; 17	GER; Ret	AUT; 16	CZE; 12	GBR; 13	RSM; 12	ARA; 17	JPN; 11	AUS; 10	MAL; 8	VAL; 12			20th	37	–		3rd	47
2017						QAT	ARG	AME	SPA	FRA	ITA	CAT	NED	GER	CZE	AUT	GBR	RSM	ARA	JPN	AUS	MAL	VAL								
2017	MotoGP	Monster Yamaha Tech 3	YZR-M1	5	(France) Johann Zarco	Ret	5	5	4	2	7	5	**14**	9	12	5	6	15	9	**8**	4	3	2			6th	174	4th	258	2nd	321
2017	MotoGP	Monster Yamaha Tech 3	YZR-M1	23	(Australia) Broc Parkes																22					31st	0	4th	258	2nd	321
2017	MotoGP	Monster Yamaha Tech 3	YZR-M1	31	(Japan) Kohta Nozane															Ret						NC	0	4th	258	2nd	321
2017	MotoGP	Monster Yamaha Tech 3	YZR-M1	60	(Netherlands) Michael van der Mark																	16	17			28th	0	4th	258	2nd	321
2017	MotoGP	Monster Yamaha Tech 3	YZR-M1	94	(Germany) Jonas Folger	10	6	11	8	7	13	6	Ret	2	10	Ret	DNS	9	16							10th	84	4th	258	2nd	321
2017	Moto2	Tech 3 Racing	Tech 3 Mistral 610	87	(Australia) Remy Gardner	Ret	Ret		20	20	14	19	16	12	9	15	20	12	20	12	15	Ret	22			21st	23	–		5th	107
2017	Moto2	Tech 3 Racing	Tech 3 Mistral 610	97	(Spain) Xavi Vierge	9	5	9	Ret	9	DNS	8	DNS		5	Ret	12	14	14	2	5	8	Ret			11th	98	–		5th	107
2018						QAT	ARG	AME	SPA	FRA	ITA	CAT	NED	GER	CZE	AUT	GBR	RSM	ARA	THA	JPN	AUS	MAL	VAL							
2018	MotoGP	Monster Yamaha Tech 3	YZR-M1	5	(France) Johann Zarco	**8**	2	6	2	**Ret**	10	7	8	9	7	9	C	10	14	5	6	Ret	3	7		6th	158	6th	204	3rd	281
2018	MotoGP	Monster Yamaha Tech 3	YZR-M1	55	(Malaysia) Hafizh Syahrin	14	9	Ret	16	12	12	Ret	18	11	14	16	C	19	18	12	10	Ret	10	10		16th	46	6th	204	3rd	281
2018	Moto2	Tech 3 Racing	Tech 3 Mistral 610	64	(Netherlands) Bo Bendsneyder	18	28	20	16	16	Ret	Ret	17	20	Ret	22	C	20	25	14	Ret					29th	2	12th	42	4th	40
2018	Moto2	Tech 3 Racing	Tech 3 Mistral 610	87	(Australia) Remy Gardner	12	6	17				15	18	11	Ret	Ret	C	12	19	12	15	Ret	Ret	5		19th	40	12th	42	4th	40
2018	Moto2	Tech 3 Racing	Tech 3 Mistral 610	14	(Spain) Héctor Garzó				23	Ret	20													DNS		NC	0	12th	42	4th	40
2018	Moto2	Tech 3 Racing	Tech 3 Mistral 610	67	(Australia) Bryan Staring																	21				NC	0	12th	42	4th	40
2018	Moto2	Tech 3 Racing	Tech 3 Mistral 610	30	(Indonesia) Dimas Ekky Pratama																		23			NC	0	12th	42	4th	40
2019						QAT	ARG	AME	SPA	FRA	ITA	CAT	NED	GER	CZE	AUT	GBR	RSM	ARA	THA	JPN	AUS	MAL	VAL							
2019	MotoGP	Red Bull KTM Tech3	KTM RC16	27	(Spain) Iker Lecuona																			Ret		NC	0	10th	42	5th	111
2019	MotoGP	Red Bull KTM Tech3	KTM RC16	55	(Malaysia) Hafizh Syahrin	20	16	18	19	14	Ret	Ret	15	16	Ret	Ret	13	15	21	20	19	15	16	15		23rd	9	10th	42	5th	111
2019	MotoGP	Red Bull KTM Tech3	KTM RC16	88	(Portugal) Miguel Oliveira	17	11	14	18	15	16	12	13	18	13	8	Ret	16	13	16	12	DNS	DNS			17th	33	10th	42	5th	111
2019	Moto2	Red Bull KTM Tech3	KTM Moto2	65	(Germany) Philipp Öttl	23	19	18	23	19	21	DNS	DNS		23	22	24	23	26	22	20	22	21	26		NC	0	14th	17	2nd	281
2019	Moto2	Red Bull KTM Tech3	KTM Moto2	72	(Italy) Marco Bezzecchi	26	16	Ret	22	18	23	23	10	19	12	23	19	Ret	15	10	Ret	Ret	Ret	19		23rd	17	14th	17	2nd	281
2019	MotoE	Tech3 E-Racing	Energica Ego Corsa			GER	AUT	RSM		VAL																					
2019	MotoE	Tech3 E-Racing	Energica Ego Corsa	4	(Spain) Héctor Garzó	4	Ret	2	2	DSQ	3															4th	69	-	-	-	-
2019	MotoE	Tech3 E-Racing	Energica Ego Corsa	78	(France) Kenny Foray	14	11	Ret	14	16	14															18th	11	-	-	-	-
2020						QAT	SPA	ANC	CZE	AUT	STY	RSM	EMI	CAT	FRA	ARA	TER	EUR	VAL	POR											
2020	MotoGP	Red Bull KTM Tech3	KTM RC16	27	(Spain) Iker Lecuona	—N/a	Ret	Ret	Ret	9	10	14	Ret	14	15	14	9		WD							20th	27	7th	152	4th	200
2020	MotoGP	Red Bull KTM Tech3	KTM RC16	82	(Finland) Mika Kallio															17						24th	0	7th	152	4th	200
2020	MotoGP	Red Bull KTM Tech3	KTM RC16	88	(Portugal) Miguel Oliveira	—N/a	8	Ret	6	Ret	1	11	5	Ret	6	16	6	5	6	1**^{PF}**						9th	125	7th	152	4th	200
2020	Moto3	Red Bull KTM Tech3	KTM RC250GP	53	(Turkey) Deniz Öncü	12	25	Ret	15	8	Ret	16	7	Ret	22	15	7	14	6	10						17th	50	12th	102	2nd	318
2020	Moto3	Red Bull KTM Tech3	KTM RC250GP	71	(Japan) Ayumu Sasaki	19	11	Ret	20	13	Ret**^{F}**	Ret	14	17	6	13	2	10	19	13						16th	52	12th	102	2nd	318
2020	MotoE	Tech3 E-Racing	Energica Ego Corsa			SPA	ANC	RSM	EMI		FRA																				
2020	MotoE	Tech3 E-Racing	Energica Ego Corsa	35	(Germany) Lukas Tulovic	4	6	12	Ret	15	10	11														11th	39	-	-	-	-
2020	MotoE	Tech3 E-Racing	Energica Ego Corsa	70	(Italy) Tommaso Marcon	12	Ret	9	5	Ret	5	Ret														16th	33	-	-	-	-
2021						QAT	DOH	POR	SPA	FRA	ITA	CAT	GER	NED	STY	AUT	GBR	ARA	RSM	AME	EMI	ALG	VAL								
2021	MotoGP	Tech3 KTM Factory Racing	KTM RC16	9	(Italy) Danilo Petrucci	Ret	19	13	14	5	9	Ret	Ret	13	18	12	10	15	16	18	Ret	Ret	18			21st	37	11th	76	5th	205
2021	MotoGP	Tech3 KTM Factory Racing	KTM RC16	27	(Spain) Iker Lecuona	17	Ret	15	17	9	11	Ret	17	Ret	15	6	7	11	Ret	16	Ret	Ret	15			20th	39	11th	76	5th	205
2021	Moto3	Red Bull KTM Tech3	KTM RC250GP	53	(Turkey) Deniz Öncü	20	18	15	20	9	Ret	3	16	15	21**^{P}**	2	8	2	21	5			5			11th	95	4th	218	1st	369
2021	Moto3	Red Bull KTM Tech3	KTM RC250GP	71	(Japan) Ayumu Sasaki	Ret	7	4	5	5	4	Ret			5	Ret	13	3	10	13	8	6	10			9th	120	4th	218	1st	369
2021	Moto3	Red Bull KTM Tech3	KTM RC250GP	96	(Spain) Daniel Holgado																20	13				(28th) 29th**	(4) 3**	4th	218	1st	369
2021	MotoE	Tech3 E-Racing	Energica Ego Corsa			SPA	FRA	CAT	NED	AUT	RSM																				
2021	MotoE	Tech3 E-Racing	Energica Ego Corsa	3	(Germany) Lukas Tulovic	Ret	7	8	5	1	8	15														8th	62	-	-	-	-
2021	MotoE	Tech3 E-Racing	Energica Ego Corsa	19	(France) Corentin Perolari	Ret	9	10	11	13	12	10														13th	31	-	-	-	-
2022						QAT	INA	ARG	AME	POR	SPA	FRA	ITA	CAT	GER	NED	GBR	AUT	RSM	ARA	JPN	THA	AUS	MAL	VAL						
2022	MotoGP	Tech3 KTM Factory Racing	KTM RC16	25	(Spain) Raúl Fernández	18	17	16	19	DNS	WD	Ret	21	15	12	Ret	21	18	13	20	18	15	16	15	12	22nd	14	12th	27	4th	240
2022	MotoGP	Tech3 KTM Factory Racing	KTM RC16	87	(Australia) Remy Gardner	15	21	17	20	14	20	Ret	19	11	15	19	18	20	19	16	19	Ret	15	18	13	23rd	13	12th	27	4th	240
2022	Moto3	Red Bull KTM Tech3	KTM RC250GP	53	(Turkey) Deniz Öncü	4	5	14	5	4**^{P}**	4	9	15**^{P}**	5	7**^{F}**	9	3**^{F}**	4	4**^{P}**	4**^{F}**	15	17	2	10	2**^{F}**	5th	200	5th	251	3rd	323
2022	Moto3	Red Bull KTM Tech3	KTM RC250GP	31	(Spain) Adrián Fernández	14	Ret	13	14	WD	Ret	20	10	9	8	Ret	15	17	16	5	18	Ret	18	15	6	20th	51	5th	251	3rd	323
2022	MotoE	Tech3 E-Racing	Energica Ego Corsa			SPA		FRA		ITA		NED		AUT		RSM															
2022	MotoE	Tech3 E-Racing	Energica Ego Corsa	4	(Spain) Héctor Garzó	4**^{F}**	Ret	5	8	9	10	5	10	5	8	10	14									8th	86	-	-	-	-
2022	MotoE	Tech3 E-Racing	Energica Ego Corsa	17	(Spain) Álex Escrig	7	8	10	12	14	13	14	6	6	5	5	8									9th	79	-	-	-	-

Season	Class	Team	Machine	No	Rider	1	2	3	4	5	6	7	8	9	10	11	12	13	14	15	16	17	18	19	20	21	22	R.C.	Points	T.C.	Points	M.C.	Points
2023						POR	ARG	AME	SPA	FRA	ITA	GER	NED	GBR	AUT	CAT	RSM	IND	JPN	INA	AUS	THA	MAL	QAT	VAL								
2023	MotoGP	GasGas Factory Racing Tech3	KTM RC16	37	(Spain) Augusto Fernández	13	11	10	13	4	15	11	10	11**^{8}**	14	9	16	Ret	7	Ret	Ret	17	14	15**^{9}**	Ret			71	17th	11th	95	2nd	373
2023	MotoGP	GasGas Factory Racing Tech3	KTM RC16	44	(Spain) Pol Espargaró	DNS								12	16**^{6}**	Ret	Ret	13	15	Ret	18	18	15	18	14			15	23rd	11th	95	2nd	373
2023	MotoGP	GasGas Factory Racing Tech3	KTM RC16	94	(Germany) Jonas Folger			12	17	13	19	17	14															9	25th	11th	95	2nd	373
2023	Moto3	Red Bull KTM Tech3	KTM RC250GP	7	(Italy) Filippo Farioli	Ret	20	18	14	18	Ret	21	21	19	21	Ret	21	11	16	20	Ret	19	8	Ret	12			24th	19	6th	239	1st	394
2023	Moto3	Red Bull KTM Tech3	KTM RC250GP	96	(Spain) Daniel Holgado	1	4	5	6	1	1	3**^{F}**	25	3	2	21**^{F}**	16	4	3	14	13	6	Ret	9^{P}	8			5th	220	6th	239	1st	394
2023	MotoE	Tech3 E-Racing	Ducati V21L			FRA		ITA		GER		GBR		NED		AUT		CAT		RSM													
2023	MotoE	Tech3 E-Racing	Ducati V21L	61	(Italy) Alessandro Zaccone	8	9	11	9	4	9	12	7	Ret	Ret	7	11	9	8	7	10							11th	104	8th	183	-	-
2023	MotoE	Tech3 E-Racing	Ducati V21L	78	(Japan) Hikari Okubo	5	10	15	12	10	8	14	12	13	8	Ret	8	13	13	9	12							13th	79	8th	183	-	-
2024						QAT	POR	AME	SPA	FRA	CAT	ITA	NED	GER	GBR	AUT	ARA	RSM	EMI	INA	JPN	AUS	THA	MAL	SLD								
2024	MotoGP	GasGas Factory Racing Tech3	KTM RC16	31	(Spain) Pedro Acosta	9**^{8 F}**	3 **^{7}**	2**^{7}**	10**^{2}**	Ret**^{6}**	13**^{3 F}**	5**^{3}**	Ret	7	9**^{5}**	13	3**^{3}**	17**^{6}**	Ret**^{5}**	2**^{6}**	Ret**^{P}**	DNS	3	5**^{9}**	10			6th	215	7th	242	2nd	327
2024	MotoGP	GasGas Factory Racing Tech3	KTM RC16	37	(Spain) Augusto Fernández	17	11	14	Ret**^{7}**	13	Ret	Ret	14	16	16	15	12	Ret	18	Ret	Ret	17**^{9}**	Ret	10	19			20th	27	7th	242	2nd	327
2024	Moto3	Red Bull GasGas Tech3	GasGas RC250GP	12	(Australia) Jacob Roulstone	10	11	8	12	12	8	9	14	Ret	17	14	21	12	21	16	17	13	15	12	8			15th	66	4th	322	5th	265
2024	Moto3	Red Bull GasGas Tech3	GasGas RC250GP	96	(Spain) Daniel Holgado	2**^{P}**	1	2 **^{F}**	7	2	6	14	11	7	4	3	9	2	4	6**^{F}**	4	2	12	Ret	2**^{F}**			2nd	256	4th	322	5th	265
2024	MotoE	Tech3 E-Racing	Ducati V21L			CAT		FRA		CAT		ITA		NED		CAT		AUT		RSM													
2024	MotoE	Tech3 E-Racing	Ducati V21L	29	(Italy) Nicholas Spinelli	1	Ret	1	1**^{F}**	Ret	Ret	10	9**^{F}**	Ret	Ret	3	2	11	8	9	11							7th	149	4th	328	-	-
2024	MotoE	Tech3 E-Racing	Ducati V21L	61	(Italy) Alessandro Zaccone	Ret**^{F}**	12	Ret	4	5	3	2**^{P F}**	6**^{P}**	DSQ**^{P}**	1**^{P}**	2**^{P}**	5**^{P}**	6	5	2	8							5th	179	4th	328	-	-
2025						THA	ARG	AME	QAT	SPA	FRA	GBR	ARA	ITA	NED	GER	CZE	AUT	HUN	CAT	RSM	JPN	INA	AUS	MAL	POR	VAL						
2025	MotoGP	Red Bull KTM Tech3	KTM RC16	12	(Spain) Maverick Viñales	16	12	14	14	4**^{7}**	5**^{5}**	11	18**^{7}**	Ret**^{4}**	5**^{6}**	DNS		DNS		13	Ret	16	DNS				Ret	18th	72	9th	213	3rd	372
2025	MotoGP	Red Bull KTM Tech3	KTM RC16	23	(Italy) Enea Bastianini	9	17	7	11	9	13	17	12	Ret	9	WD	Ret**^{3}**	5**^{7}**	Ret	3**^{5}**	Ret	11	Ret	9	7**^{9}**	18	10	14th	112	9th	213	3rd	372
2025	MotoGP	Red Bull KTM Tech3	KTM RC16	44	(Spain) Pol Espargaró												9**^{9}**		8					10**^{9}**	Ret	10		22nd	29	9th	213	3rd	372
2025	Moto3	Red Bull KTM Tech3	KTM RC250GP	12	(Australia) Jacob Roulstone			14	14	9	13	13	Ret	13	12	8	14	14	10	Ret	11	13	5	Ret	WD		16	16th	61	7th	215	1st	540
2025	Moto3	Red Bull KTM Tech3	KTM RC250GP	73	(Argentina) Valentín Perrone	Ret	Ret	Ret	15	10	10	5	13	8	3	12	8	7**^{P}**	2	10	6**^{P F}**	4	DNS	20	9	Ret	10	10th	134	7th	215	1st	540
2025	Moto3	Red Bull KTM Tech3	KTM RC250GP	78	(Spain) Joel Esteban	9	16																			4		19th	20 (33)	7th	215	1st	540
2026						THA	BRA	USA	SPA	FRA	CAT	ITA	HUN	CZE	NED	GER	GBR	ARA	RSM	AUT	JPN	INA	AUS	MAL	QAT	POR	VAL						
2026	MotoGP	Red Bull KTM Tech3	KTM RC16	12	(Spain) Maverick Viñales	16	18	DNS			11	17	15	15	13	Ret					14	17	C	14	13			23rd*	17*	7th*	169*	3rd*	363*
2026	MotoGP	Red Bull KTM Tech3	KTM RC16	23	(Italy) Enea Bastianini	12	15	6**^{3}**	8	7	Ret	Ret	9**^{8}**	10**^{7}**	6**^{8}**	9	Ret	8	8	11	4**^{4 F}**	10	C	5**^{9}**	5**^{8}**			10th*	147*	7th*	169*	3rd*	363*
2026	MotoGP	Red Bull KTM Tech3	KTM RC16	44	(Spain) Pol Espargaró												13	16	14	16								25th*	5*	7th*	169*	3rd*	363*
2026	MotoGP	Red Bull KTM Tech3	KTM RC16	96	(Germany) Jonas Folger					16																		30th*	0*	7th*	169*	3rd*	363*
2026	Moto3	Red Bull KTM Tech3	KTM RC250GP	27	(Finland) Rico Salmela	19	6	6	15	Ret	16	Ret	5	Ret	11	5	7	22	6	Ret	5	5	C	Ret	12			11th*	93*	5th*	214*	1st*	470*
2026	Moto3	Red Bull KTM Tech3	KTM RC250GP	73	(Argentina) Valentín Perrone	3**^{F}**	7	4	7	11	11**^{P}**	18	NC	10	4	Ret	3	8	5	12	14	13	C	15	16			9th*	121*	5th*	214*	1st*	470*

== See also ==
- Category:Tech3 MotoGP riders
