= Steiner Studios =

Film studio in Brooklyn, New York City

Coordinates: 40°42′2″N 73°58′2″W

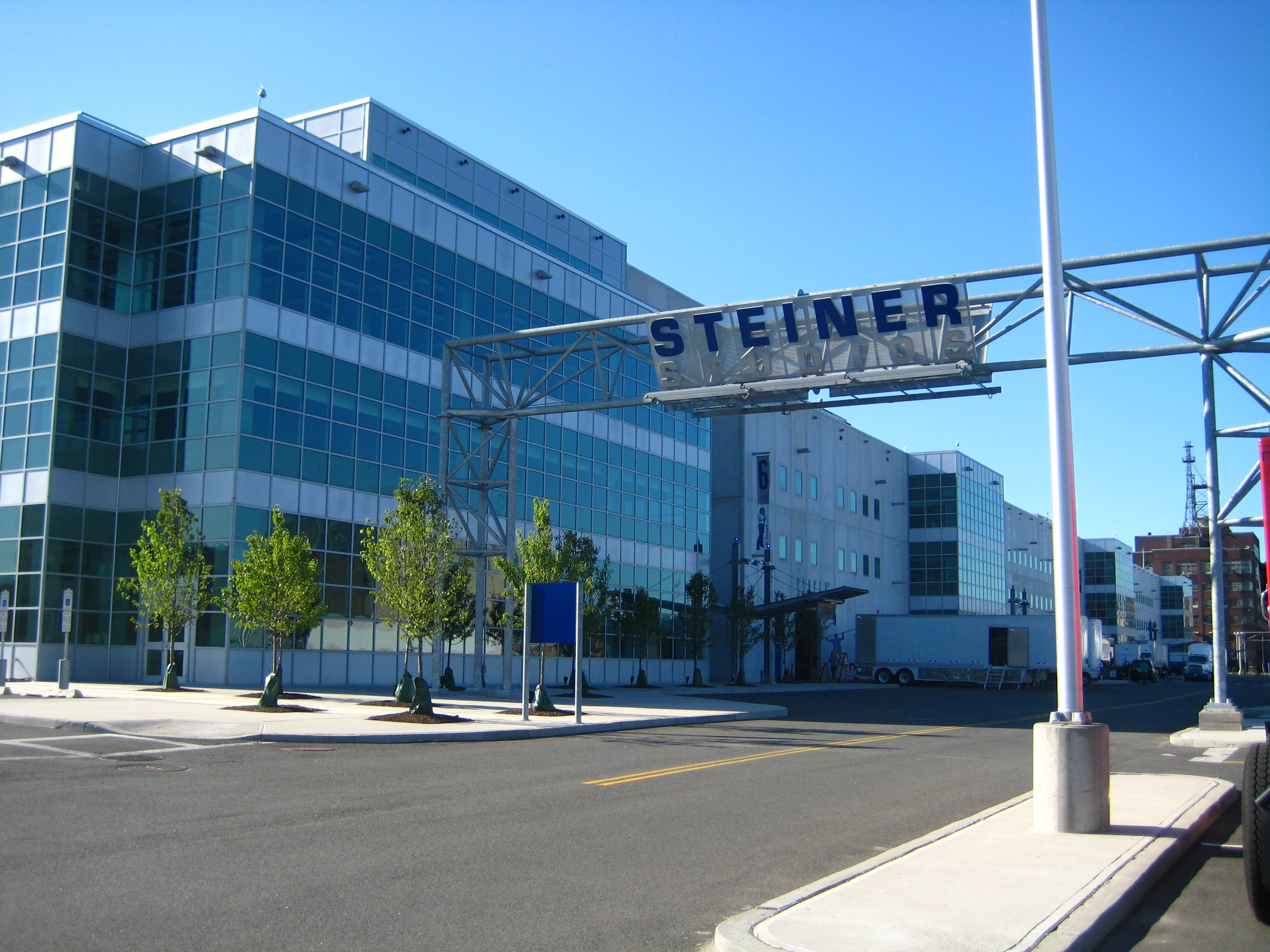
- The studio entrance, in 2007
- Type: Studio
- Industry: Entertainment
- Founded: Brooklyn, New York, U.S.
- Founder: Douglas C. Steiner
- Headquarters: Brooklyn, New York, U.S.
- Products: Motion pictures, television programs, commercials, photography
- Website: www.steinerstudios.com

Steiner Studios is a film studio at Brooklyn Navy Yard in Brooklyn, New York City. It is the largest film and television production studio complex in the United States outside Hollywood. Steiner Studios, spread across 50 acres (20 ha), contains 30 soundstages as well as additional support space.

Steiner Studios was founded in 1999, and the first soundstages at the site opened in November 2004. In 2012, Steiner Studios reached an agreement with the Brooklyn Navy Yard Development Corporation to convert its 20-acre Naval Annex Historic Campus into a media and technology hub; the expansion is projected to be completed in the mid-2020s. In 2020, Steiner Studios announced a new $550 million, 900,000 square-foot project in Sunset Park, Brooklyn.

Most recently, Inventing Anna, The Marvelous Mrs. Maisel, West Side Story, Tick, Tick...Boom!, and And Just Like That… have been filmed at Steiner Studios.

== Description ==
Steiner Studios is home to thirty soundstages, totaling 780,000 square feet (72,000 m^{2}) and making it New York’s largest production facility. There is also an additional 224,000 square feet (20,800 m^{2}) of support space, which includes offices, dressing rooms, hair and make-up rooms, wardrobe rooms, mill shops, a spray booth, and prop storage. Office and support spaces have access to satellite uplinks and a high-speed data backbone.

Soundstages are equipped with full grids from 26 to 45 feet, are column-free, sound-insulated, and offer loading and staging areas. Built to accommodate film, high-definition television (HDTV) and digital camera productions, each stage is wired with a minimum of 4,800 amps of power and 50 to 200 tons of cooling. Stages are accessed via 13-foot-high (4.0 m) to 20-foot-high (6.1 m) elephant doors.

Each stage is attached to production and support space, including make-up and dressing rooms, green rooms, storage areas, conference rooms, and offices. In addition to the enclosed building areas, there are assembly and secondary areas for "lay-down" of materials and equipment used in large-scale film projects. The facility features a 100-seat screening room and a full commissary, on-site parking, 24/7 security and lighting and grip equipment services.

== History ==
In 2003, Douglas C. Steiner began development of what later became New York City's largest television and movie production facility, on 20 acres (8.1 ha) of the Navy Yard. Steiner Studios opened in November 2004. The site initially included a 280,000-square-foot (26,000 m^{2}) studio spread across five stages.

An expansion of the facility through renovation of a seven-story building in the Navy Yard, was announced by chairman Douglas Steiner, on February 15, 2007. The studio was the location of the 17th annual Gotham Awards held on November 27, 2007.

In March 2012, Mayor Michael Bloomberg unveiled five new sound stages (a total of 30,500 square feet (2,830 m^{2})) at Steiner Studios. The new sound stages all feature two or three wall cycloramas.

Brooklyn College opened the Feirstein Graduate School of Cinema on Steiner Studios' production lot for the fall 2013 semester. It is the first public graduate school of film in New York and is thought to be the only film school in the country located on a working film lot. In November 2013, Carnegie Mellon University announced the creation of the Integrative Media Program at Steiner Studios.

=== Expansions ===
In 2012, Steiner Studios proposed building a media campus at the former site of Brooklyn Naval Hospital. located just east of the existing Steiner Studios lot. Steiner Studios planned to restore the hospital buildings starting in 2017, and restoration was expected to take nearly a decade.

The extant buildings at the hospital included the main building, surgeon's house, quarters 4 through 7, bachelors' and nurses' quarters, carriage houses and stables, the medical supply depot, and the morgue/lumber shed. Steiner proposed to convert these structures into production, post-production, and production support space. The hospital had been listed on the National Register of Historic Places (NRHP) in 2014. Steiner Studios' plan calls for the restoration of 15 NRHP-listed buildings at the Brooklyn Naval Hospital campus, but would also demolish some of the NRHP-contributing artifacts to make way for the new facility, Structures with a total floor area of 2,700 square feet (250 m^{2}) would be demolished and replaced with landscaped lawn space.

Steiner Studios acquired the Wythe Diner, a 1950s diner formerly located on Wythe Avenue, in August 2025 and moved it to the Brooklyn Navy Yard facility that December.

==== Sunset Park expansion ====
In 2020, Steiner Studios signed a deal to build a new $550 million studio complex at the city-owned portion of Bush Terminal in Sunset Park, Brooklyn, where it would erect a studio of 900,000 square feet (84,000 m^{2}) and eight soundstages.

=== Lobbying ===
Steiner Studios benefits from New York's movie production incentive program. Douglas Steiner donated $40,000 to incumbent New York Governor Kathy Hochul’s 2022 campaign. The company spends $10,000 a month on lobbyists.

== Productions ==
=== Film ===
Year	Films
2005	The Producers: The Movie Musical
2006	Fur
2006	The Hoax
2006	My Super Ex-Girlfriend
2006	Inside Man
2006	Factory Girl
2006	The Namesake
2007	Across the Universe
2007	Then She Found Me
2007	Enchanted
2007	Funny Games
2007	The Nanny Diaries
2007	Life Support
2007	Spider-Man 3
2007	American Gangster
2007	Chapter 27
2008	Deception
2008	Revolutionary Road
2008	Burn After Reading
2008	Baby Mama
2008	Wanted
2008	The Wackness
2008	Ghost Town
2008	Pride and Glory
2008	The Guitar
2008	Sex and the City
2009	Loving Leah
2009	Confessions of a Shopaholic
2009	The Taking of Pelham 123
2009	G-Force
2009	Did You Hear About the Morgans?
2009	Brooklyn's Finest
2010	Sex and the City 2
2010	The Sorcerer's Apprentice
2010	Every Day
2010	See You in September
2010	When in Rome
2010	Multiple Sarcasms
2010	An Invisible Sign
2011	Mr. Popper's Penguins
2011	The Adjustment Bureau
2012	Men in Black 3
2017	Going in Style
2019	Joker
2021	West Side Story
2021	Tick, Tick...Boom!
2024	IF

=== Television ===
- 30 Rock
- The Affair
- And Just Like That...
- Blindspot
- Bored to Death
- Boardwalk Empire
- The Carrie Diaries
- City on a Hill
- Clash of the Choirs
- Cupid
- Damages
- Deception
- The Deuce
- Dickinson
- Donny!
- Flesh and Bone
- Flight of the Conchords
- The Following
- Girls
- God Friended Me
- Gossip Girl
- Gotham
- Happyish
- Hip Hop Squares
- Hunters
- The Interestings
- In Treatment
- Inventing Anna
- Little Voice
- Made in Jersey
- The Marvelous Mrs. Maisel
- Mildred Pierce
- A Muppet Christmas: Letters to Santa
- Pan Am
- Pose
- Power
- Power Book II: Ghost
- Red Oaks
- Sweetbitter
- The Unusuals
- Vinyl
- The Who Was? Show

== See also ==
- Gotham Awards
