= Giuseppe Steiner =

Giuseppe Steiner can refer to:

- Giuseppe Steiner (bobsleigh) (1893–?), Italian Olympic bobsledder
- Giuseppe Steiner (skier) (1929–2007), Italian Olympic skier
