= Douglas C. Steiner =

American real estate developer

- Born: 1960 (age 65–66)
- Education: Stanford
- Occupations: Real estate developer Studio chairman
- Organization: Steiner Equities Group
- Spouse: Married 1988-2000
- Children: 3
- Father: David S. Steiner

Douglas Craig Steiner is a Brooklyn-based real estate developer who developed properties in New Jersey and New York and other states. In addition, he was chairman of Steiner Studios in Brooklyn, New York, the largest studio on the East Coast of the United States.

== Early years ==
Steiner grew up in South Orange, New Jersey. He worked at one point as a gardener during his college years. Initially he wanted to be a novelist but while studying creative writing at Stanford, where he was editor of Stanford's humor magazine, he found writing to be "torture." After graduation, he lived for six months in Paris, supported by his father David S. Steiner, but returned thereafter to work at his father's real estate development firm.

== Real estate ==
At his father's firm, Steiner worked to develop numerous properties, such as office expansions and condominiums. He describes himself as a control freak; for example, he insists that office temperatures be kept at 63 degrees Fahrenheit throughout the year. In recent years, his firm is constructing an L-shaped 56-story condominium tower called The Hub, at 333 Schermerhorn Street, which has been predicted to be the tallest building in Brooklyn after completion.

== Steiner Studios ==
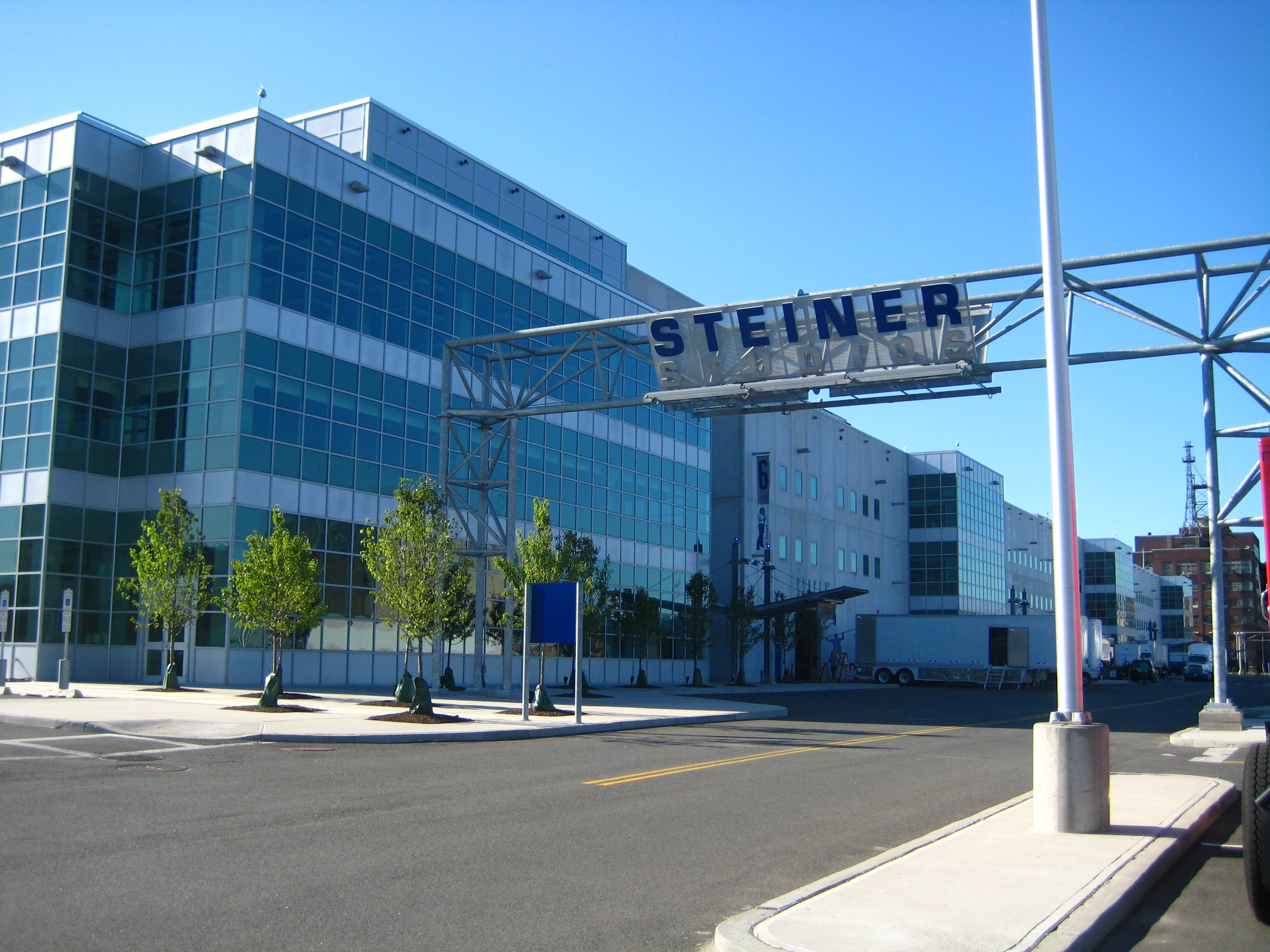
Exterior of Steiner Studios in 2007.

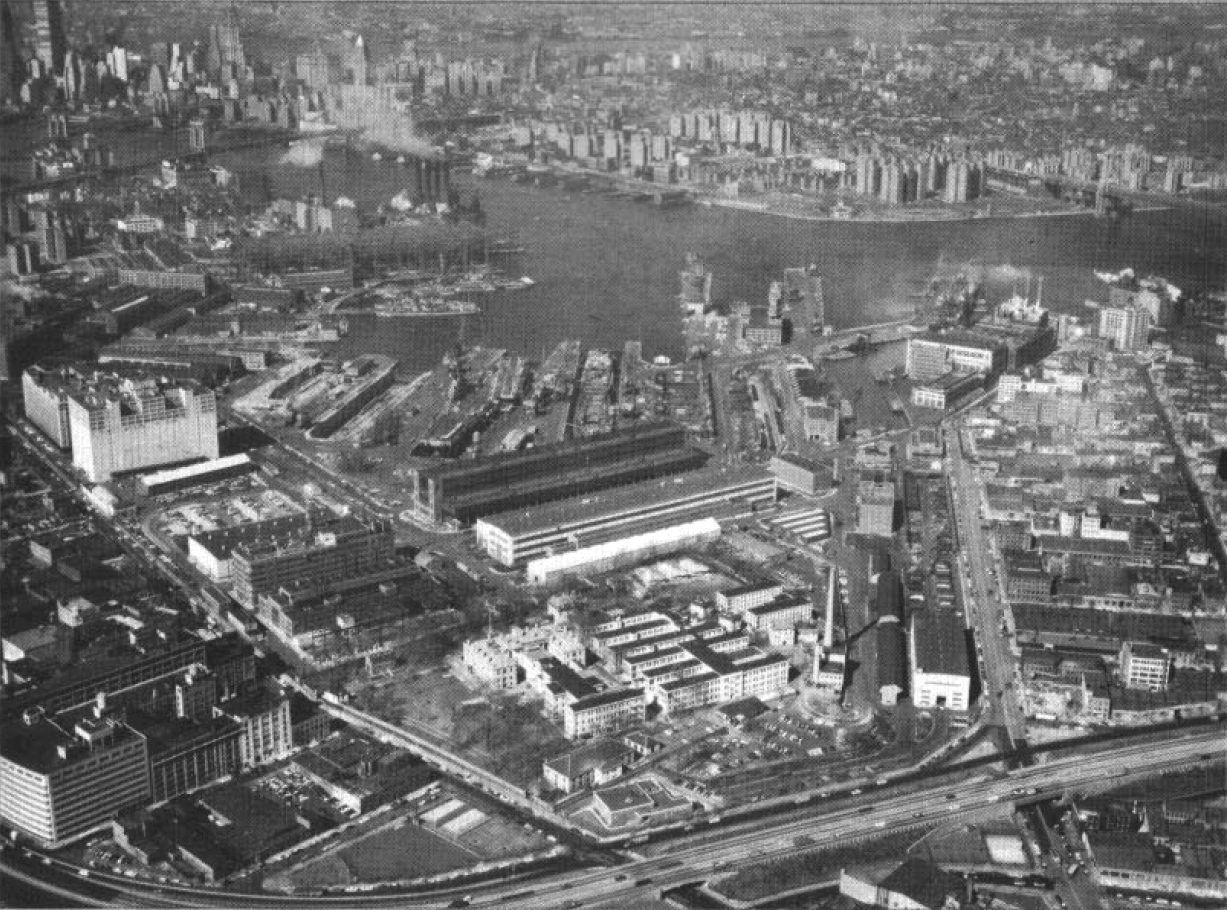
Aerial view of the Brooklyn Navy Yard in 1965, with the aircraft carrier USS Intrepid. The Navy abandoned the site in 1966.

The father-son team created a film and TV production company called Steiner Studios. In 1999, they won the right to develop the Brooklyn Navy Yard into a film and TV production complex, which opened in 2004. The Yard had been a massive military complex, which closed in 1966, and later became a manufacturing center. Developing the complex had been projected to cost around $400 million and would require twelve years to finish. Plans called for an underwater stage as well as restoration of the Naval hospital, originally built in 1838 using marble. The transformation of the Brooklyn Navy Yard had been forecast to be completed by 2018.

Numerous films and TV shows have been made at the production facility, including the 2006 movie Fur starring Nicole Kidman and Robert Downey Jr., the 2005 film The Producers starring Matthew Broderick and Nathan Lane and Uma Thurman, as well as Spider-Man, Sex and the City, and Boardwalk Empire. The Steiner Studios site is 15 acres, according to several reports. The site has been expanded numerous times to include a parking lot with 1000 spots and five massive interconnected state-of-the-art soundstages. Development was beset by obstacles such as the September 11 attacks in 2001 as well as cutbacks in a tax-credit program by New York State in 2009. He helped bring in a Wegmans supermarket to the Brooklyn Navy Yard project. In addition, he led efforts to bring academic programs focused on media to the city; for example, he worked with Carnegie Mellon University to offer an "integrated media program" consisting of an academic program focused on the arts and technology, in conjunction with Steiner Studios; and he has worked with the City University of New York to have its Barry R. Feirstein Graduate School of Cinema located at Steiner Studios.

The company benefits from New York's movie production incentive program. Steiner donated $40,000 to incumbent New York Governor Kathy Hochul’s 2022 campaign. The company spends $10,000 a month on lobbyists.

== Personal life ==
Steiner has three grown children. He collects art by Gary Panter, Suzan Pitt and Jane Dickson, and said he prefers "weird, disturbing or strange art."
