= Josef Steiner (politician, born 1926) =

Austrian politician (1926–1990)

Josef Steiner (3 September 1926 – 24 July 1990) was an Austrian farmer and politician for the Austrian People's Party.

He was born in Altenmarkt im Pongau, where he also died. Taking over the family farm in 1957, he was a member of Altenmarkt's local council and became vice mayor in 1964. He was also elected to Salzburg Kammer für Land- und Forstwirtschaft in 1962 and 1965. He became elected to the National Council in 1963, and served until April 1982.
