= Manfred Steiner =

Manfred Steiner may refer to:

- Manfred Steiner (ski jumper) (born 1962), Austrian ski jumper
- Manfred Steiner (physician) (1931–2023), Austrian-American hematologist and physicist
- Manfred Steiner (footballer) (1950–2020), Austrian footballer
