= Jacob D. Steiner =

American politician

Jacob D. Steiner was an American politician. He was a member of the South Dakota House of Representatives.

== Biography ==
Steiner was born in Lomira, Wisconsin in June 1861. In 1890, he married Amanda Korte. They would have five children.

== Career ==
Steiner was a member of the House of Representatives from 1903 to 1906. He was a Republican.
