= Josef Steiner (politician, born 1901) =

Austrian politician (1901–1973)

Josef Steiner (30 September 1901 – 13 July 1973) was an Austrian farmer and politician for the Social Democratic Party.

He was born in Baldramsdorf, where he also died. Taking over the family farm in 1935, he was a member of Baldramsdorf's local council as well as being vice president of the Kärnten Landwirtschaftskammer. He became elected to the National Council in 1945, and served until March 1966.
