= Guenther Steiner =

Italian and American motor racing engineer (born 1965)

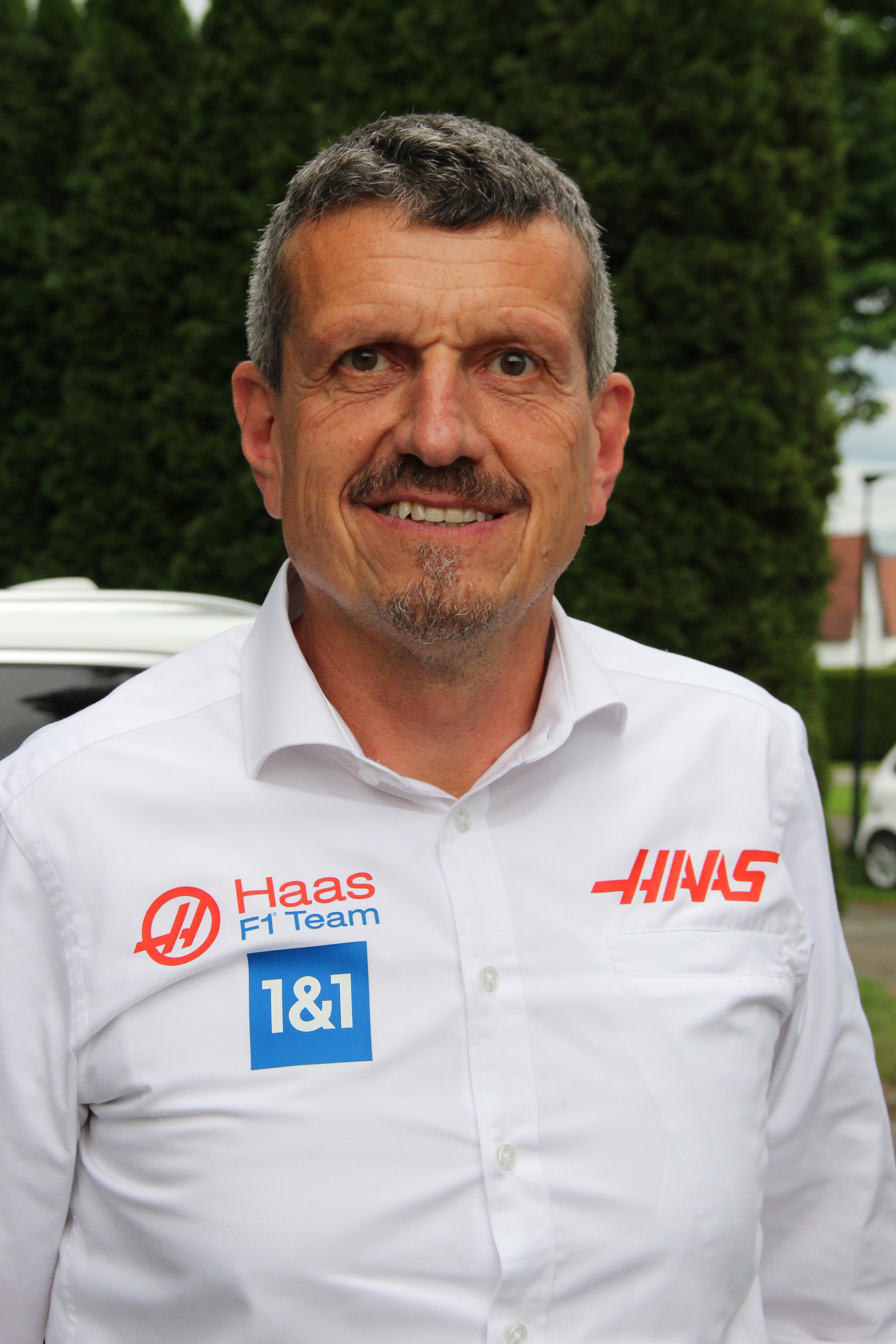
- Steiner at the 2022 Austrian Grand Prix
- Born: 7 April 1965 (age 61); Merano, South Tyrol, Italy
- Citizenship: Italy; United States
- Occupations: Investor; motorsport executive
- Title: Team Owner; Chief Executive Officer
- Spouse: Gertraud Steiner
- Children: 1

Guenther Steiner (born 7 April 1965, German: Günther) is an Italian and American motorsport engineer and former team manager. Steiner was the Team Principal of Haas Formula One Team from 2016 to 2023, the managing director of Jaguar Racing from 2001 to 2003, and technical operations director of its subsequent incarnation, Red Bull Racing. He is currently the CEO and owner of the MotoGP and Moto3 team Red Bull KTM Tech3. He acquired full ownership of the team from Hervé Poncharal through an investment consortium financed by IKON Capital.

== Career ==
=== Rally (1986–2001) ===
Born in Merano, South Tyrol, the son of a butcher, Steiner studied engineering; however, without completing his degree, he then moved to Belgium, where he began his career as a mechanic in the World Rally Championship for Mazda Rally Team Europe from 1986 to 1988.

From January 1989 – 1990, Steiner worked as the assistant team manager for Top Run Srl. He acted as head of reconnaissance, and later as a technical manager, at Jolly Club from 1991 to 1996.

In 1997, Steiner managed Prodrive's Allstar Rally team, winning the European Rally Championship with Krzysztof Hołowczyc, and in 1998 M-Sport recruited him as project manager. In 2000, he was promoted to director of engineering, where he worked under the Ford World Rally Team alongside drivers Colin McRae and Carlos Sainz; ultimately, securing consecutive runner-up finishes in the 2000 and 2001 seasons.

=== Jaguar (2001–2003) ===
Steiner switched to Formula One in 2001 when Ford's official Formula One full-works team, Jaguar Racing, appointed him as their new team principal. Niki Lauda headhunted Steiner for the job of managing director. According to Steiner, "[Lauda] asked, 'are there any talented people at Ford?' And the reply was 'there's Günther.' The guy lied!" Assuming the role on 3 December, Steiner was responsible for the engineering side of the team at Milton Keynes, while the director of strategy John Allison handled administrative tasks.

Steiner reorganised the team and reduced costs during his tenure. However, Jaguar underperformed in the 2002 season, with lead driver Eddie Irvine claiming only eight championship points while teammate Pedro de la Rosa failed to score, and parent company Ford dismissed Lauda on 26 November before making 70 team members redundant.

On 5 December 2002, Jaguar announced Steiner had been replaced by project manager David Pitchforth as part of the restructuring. Spokesman Nav Sidhu said, "he has relinquished his responsibilities as MD but has done nothing wrong. This organisation is in significantly better shape now than when he joined. Günther has clearly laid down the engineering baseline that David will now aim to take on to the next level."

Although Jaguar's new management offered Steiner another role in the team, he ultimately declined.

=== Opel (2003–2004) ===
Steiner spent the 2003 Formula One season on garden leave before replacing Wiet Huidekoper as technical director at Opel Performance Center in November of that year. The 2004 Deutsche Tourenwagen Masters was contested with the Opel Vectra GTS V8 DTM.

=== Red Bull (2005–2008) ===
After Red Bull purchased Jaguar Racing in November 2004, Steiner was invited to join Red Bull Racing. Opel's plans to withdraw from the Deutsche Tourenwagen Masters at the end of 2005 motivated his return to the Milton Keynes team. His appointment as technical operations director was confirmed on 13 January 2005.

Steiner and team principal Christian Horner jointly led the outfit to improved results in the 2005 season, but when Red Bull poached championship-winning technical director Adrian Newey from McLaren, team owner Dietrich Mateschitz approached Steiner to help establish a NASCAR team in the United States. Feeling the F1 team had become overcrowded, Steiner consulted his wife and agreed to move to Mooresville, North Carolina, where he served as Team Red Bull's technical director from 1 April 2006 to April 2008.

=== Haas (2014–2023) ===
Steiner remained in Mooresville after leaving Red Bull, where he founded the manufacturing company Fibreworks Composites in January 2009.

Steiner has stated that the original vision for establishing the Haas F1 Team began with a business plan he wrote at his kitchen table during the financial crisis of the late 2000s, when he saw an opportunity for a new entry into Formula 1 and sought to attract a financial backer willing to fund the project.

While the US F1 Team was in development, Steiner met Joe Custer and Gene Haas of Stewart–Haas Racing, who had declined to invest in the project, at a steakhouse. He proposed they themselves enter F1 by ordering a customer car from an established constructor, but delays in securing approval prompted them to apply for entry as a privateer team. He has credited support from figures including Niki Lauda, Stefano Domenicali, Jean Todt, and Charlie Whiting as crucial to convincing then-Formula 1 leadership, including Bernie Ecclestone, to approve the team’s entry into the sport.

Steiner, described as "the prime 'doer'" by motorsport publication Autosport, recruited the core staff, interviewed every team member, and developed partnerships with outsourcers Dallara and Ferrari. On 14 April 2014, he was officially announced team principal of the fledgling Haas F1 Team.

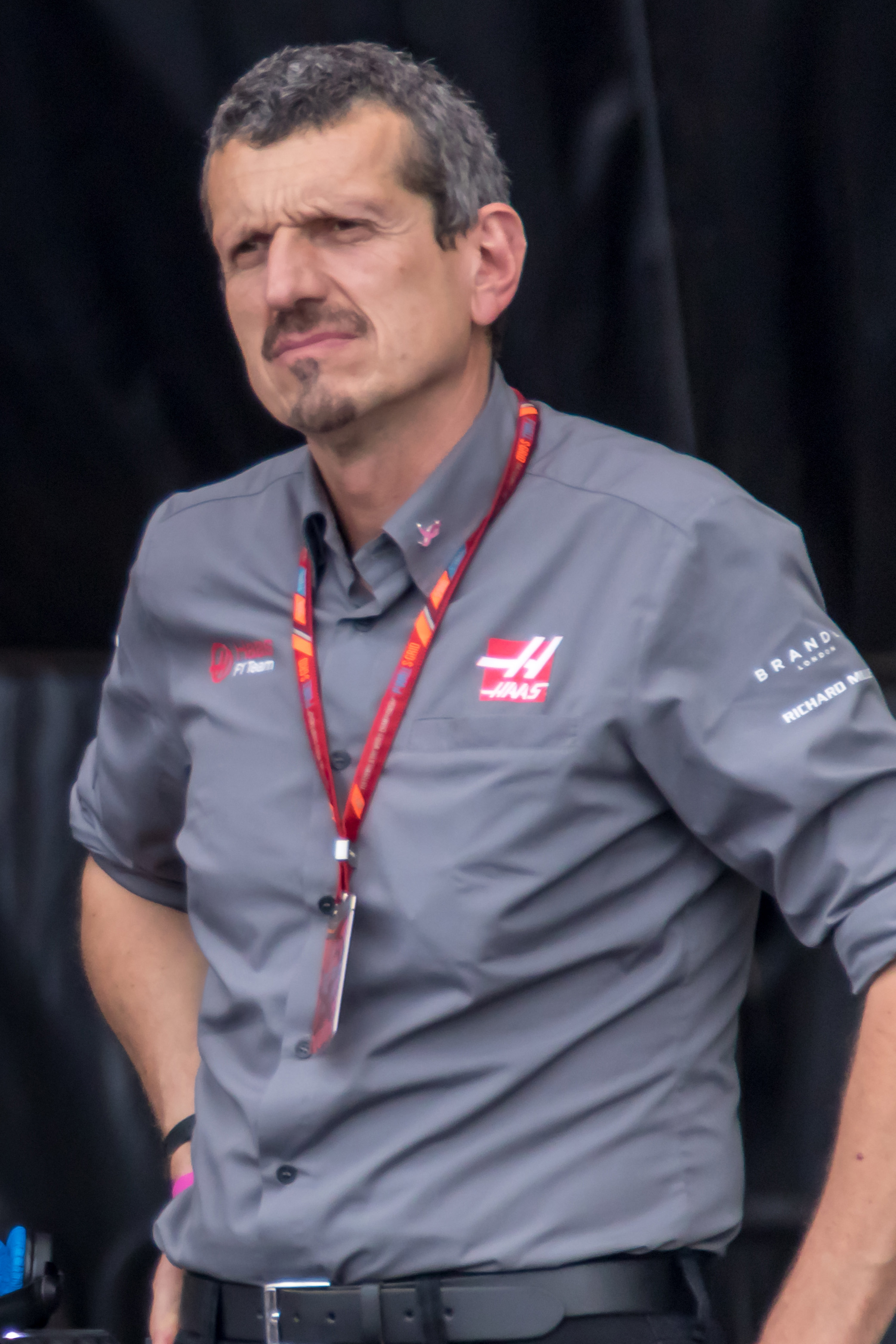
Steiner at the 2017 United States Grand Prix

With their entry in the 2016 season, Haas became the first American constructor to compete in F1 in 30 years. The team took eight points at the 2016 Australian Grand Prix with a 6th-place finish by driver Romain Grosjean, becoming the first American entry, and the first constructor overall since Toyota Racing in 2002, to score in their debut race. Haas completed the season with an 8th-place finish in the 2016 constructor standings and 29 points, all scored by Grosjean.

At Haas, Steiner became notable for his forthright personality, particularly for his appearances on the Netflix series Formula 1: Drive to Survive which featured him frequently swearing. In 2023 he released a book, Surviving to Drive: A year inside Formula 1, about his experiences.

In January 2024, it was announced that Haas had chosen not to renew Steiner's contract for the 2024 season. He was replaced by Ayao Komatsu, the team's former trackside engineering director.

In May 2024, it was reported that Steiner had sued Haas for non-payment of commissions that he was owed over several years and for continuing to sell merchandise featuring his name and image, as well as using him on Haas' official website without his authorisation. A few days later, it was reported that Haas Automation, the parent company of Haas F1 Team, is suing Steiner and his publisher Ten Speed Press for trademark infringements in his Surviving to Drive autobiography. In September, Haas Automation's lawsuit was dismissed by the court.

In October 2024 Steiner released his second book, Unfiltered: My Incredible Decade in Formula 1, detailing his experiences leading Haas F1 team.

As part of the promotional activities for the release of his second book, Steiner embarked on a tour of multiple venues in the United Kingdom with a live show, to be held between November 2024 and June 2025.

=== F1 Commentator and Tech3 acquisition (2024–present) ===
In late February 2024, Steiner signed a contract with RTL, a German television channel who broadcast F1 in Germany, as a specialist commentator. He was scheduled to attend the 2024 Bahrain Grand Prix paddock and at least seven Grands Prix for the 2024 season. Steiner began his role as the race ambassador for the Miami Grand Prix in April 2024.

In September 2025, Steiner was named head of the consortium that acquired the Red Bull KTM Tech3 MotoGP motorcycle racing team.

== Personal life ==
Steiner holds Italian and American passports, and lives in Mooresville, North Carolina, with his wife, Gertraud, and daughter. Being a native of South Tyrol, he speaks German and Italian, along with English.
