= SK Support Macau =

SK Support Ltd. is one of four different companies under the umbrella of the SK Group Macau with headquarters in Macau, S.A.R. China. It operates in the Asian regions as well as internationally with a focus on England and Germany. The SK Group Macau contains furthermore an event management company in the Asian region, MacauBusiness SK Events Ltd. as well as SK Merchandising Ltd., producing event and corporate wear and Motorsport Development Ltd., developing targeted PR and marketing concepts in Sports.

== Field of Work ==
The main field of work of SK Support are consultancy and sport sponsorship, supporting various events like the annual Macau Grand Prix as well as the Inclusion Conference Macau and Macau Golf Masters - formerly Special Olympics Golf Masters. Furthermore, it organizes corporate incentive and event travel as well as consultulting international clients in Corporate Social Responsibility related to sport and social work.

Referring to the first point, known partners are competitors in international motorcycle road racing such as Penz13.com racing team as well as PBM Be Wiser team for their involvement in the Macau Grand Prix as well as riders such as Sheridan Morais, Michael Laverty, Danny Webb and more.
