= Ethan Sparks =

British motorcycle racer (born 2010)

- Born: 8 December 2010 (age 15); Pembury, Kent, England
- Nationality: British
- Current team: MLav Racing
- Bike number: 62
Statistics
Moto4 European Cup
Active years	2025–
Championships	0
Manufacturer	Honda
Last season (2026)	14th (38 pts)
Starts / Wins / Podiums / Poles / F. laps / Points; 17 / 0 / 1 / 0 / 0 / 54

Ethan Gavin Sparks (born 8 December 2010) is a British motorcycle racer who competes in the Moto4 European Cup with MLav Racing, as well as in the Red Bull Rookies Cup.

In 2025, Sparks was crowned British Talent Cup champion. He has been coached by Michael Laverty, Danny Webb, and former Isle of Man TT and Grand Prix race winner Chas Mortimer.

== Career ==
=== Early career ===
Sparks was born in Pembury, England. He started riding minibikes at the age of five, at a Swindon-based academy. His first championship participation was in the Cool FAB British Minibike Championship in 2017, where he claimed his first win in his debut year. Sparks moved up to the Mini GP50 Cool Fab Championship for 2020, aged nine, a category previously won by Scott Redding, Danny Kent, and Scott Ogden. He claimed the title in his rookie season and became the youngest-ever winner of the class. Sparks stepped up to the GP70 class, where he would go on to win back-to-back titles for the next three years.

These results earned him a wildcard appearance in the 2022 Spanish Moto4 championship at Jerez. In 2023, he returned to Moto4 for a second year, this time clinching three podiums—two third-place finishes at Aragón and Estoril, and a win at Valencia.

=== British Talent Cup (2025) ===
In 2025, Sparks was selected to compete in the British Talent Cup. He claimed the British Talent Cup title in his rookie year, becoming the first rider to do so, with six wins and 13 podiums in total. This feat granted him a spot in the 2026 Red Bull MotoGP Rookies Cup.

=== Moto4 European Cup (2025–) ===
Sparks entered the 2025 European Talent Cup with MRE Talent. He failed to qualify on his debut at Estoril, but made the cut in the following round at Jerez, finishing 13th and 10th in Races 1 and 2. Sparks missed two rounds due to his participation in the British Talent Cup, and his best finish was ninth place at Montmeló. On 26 November 2025, it was announced that Sparks would be joining the Michael Laverty-led MLav Racing team in the 2026 Moto4 European Cup.

== Career statistics ==
=== FIM MiniGP World Series ===
(key) (Races in bold indicate pole position; races in italics indicate fastest lap)

Year	Class	Bike	1	2	3	Pos	Pts
2023	160cc	Ohvale	VAL; R1; 4	VAL; R2; 3	VAL; SFR; 6	4th	49
2024	190cc	Ohvale	ARA; R1; 7	ARA; R2; 5	ARA; SFR; 2	4th	60

=== British Talent Cup ===
==== Races by year ====
(key) (Races in bold indicate pole position, races in italics indicate fastest lap)

Year	Bike	1		2		3		4		5		6			7		8			Pos	Pts
Year	Bike	R1	R2	R1	R2	R1	R2	R1	R2	R1	R2	R1	R2	R3	R1	R2	R1	R2	R3	Pos	Pts
2025	Honda	DON; 4	DON; 2	SIL; Ret	SIL; 4	SNE; Ret	SNE; 2	**BRH**; 1	**BRH**; 1	THR; 2	THR; 5	DON; 1	**DON**; 1	**DON**; 2	**ASS**; 1	**ASS**; 2	OUL; 2	OUL; 1	OUL; 2	1st	327

=== Moto4 European Cup ===
==== Races by year ====
(key) (Races in bold indicate pole position; races in italics indicate fastest lap)

Year	Bike	1	2	3	4	5	6	7	8	9	10	11	Pos	Pts
2025	Honda	EST1; DNQ	EST2; DNQ	JER1; 13	JER2; 10	MAG1; Ret	MAG2; 16	ARA	MIS1	MIS2	BAR; 9	VAL; 17	23rd	16
2026	Honda	BAR; 15	EST1; 20	EST2; 6	JER1; 9	JER2; Ret	MAG1; 16	MAG2; 19	VAL1; Ret	VAL2; Ret	ARA; 19	MIS; 2	14th	38

=== Red Bull MotoGP Rookies Cup ===
==== Races by year ====
(key) (Races in bold indicate pole position; races in italics indicate fastest lap)

Year	Bike	1		2		3		4		5		6		7		Pos	Pts
Year	Bike	R1	R2	R1	R2	R1	R2	R1	R2	R1	R2	R1	R2	R1	R2	Pos	Pts
2026	KTM	JER; 12	JER; 18	LMS; 12	LMS; 14	MUG; 11	MUG; 17	ASS; 10	ASS; 19	SAC; 14	SAC; 10	MIS; 7	MIS; 5	RBR; Ret	RBR; 4	16th	62
