= 2026 Moto4 British Cup =

Motorcycle road racing season

2026 Moto4 British Cup
Previous:	2025	Next:	2027

The 2026 R&G Moto4 British Cup was the first year run under that name and the ninth season of the competition, being previously known as the British Talent Cup (Moto4 British Cup). A motorcycle racing series run by MSVR in collaboration with MotoGP rights holder Dorna Sports and sponsored by R&G, it is intended for riders mainly from the British Isles.

The 2026 championship winner was Ryan Frost.

== Entry list ==
The entry list including the newly selected riders and returning riders was released on 2 April 2026. All riders compete on identical 250cc Honda NSF250R motorcycles and use series-specified Pirelli tyres.

Team	No.	Rider	Status	Rounds
AH Racing	12	(United Kingdom) Archie Hooper	R	1–3
A Edwards Racing	67	(United Kingdom) George Bowes		1–3
Burrows Engineering	16	(United Kingdom) Jack Burrows		1–3
Dunsley Heat Racing	78	(United Kingdom) Joshua Williams		1–2
Fibre Tec Honda	19	(United Kingdom) Tyler Humphries	R	1–3
Fibre Tec Honda	23	(Spain) Álex Remesal	R	1–3
Fibre Tec Honda	24	(United Kingdom) Ryan Frost		1–3
Fibre Tec Honda	42	(United Kingdom) Thorley Trevorrow	R	1–3
Fibre Tec Honda	71	(United Kingdom) Lucy Curtis	R	1–3
Fibre Tec Honda	90	(Bermuda) Aeziah Divine		1–3
Kovara Projects	7	(United Kingdom) Luke Fitchett	R	1–3
Kovara Projects	37	(United Kingdom) Marco Holt	R	1–3
Kovara Projects	63	(United Kingdom) Jack Dunabie		1–3
LRA Moto	15	(United Kingdom) Harrison Day	R	1–3
Mortimer Racing	34	(United Kingdom) Charlie Cunningham	R	1–2
Mortimer Racing	88	(United Kingdom) Mason Foster		1–3
Olly O'Gorman Racing	87	(Republic of Ireland) Olly O'Gorman	R	3
Rides R Us NW Racing	27	(United Kingdom) Hudson Cooper	R	1, 3
Rocket Racing	18	(United Kingdom) Daniel Stephenson	R	3
RS Racing	64	(United Kingdom) Clayton Edmunds		1–3
Stanford Racing	31	(United Kingdom) Henry McCartney	R	1–2
Wilson Racing	11	(United Kingdom) Jensen Bishop		1–3
Wilson Racing	58	(United Kingdom) Max Rhodes	R	1–3
Wilson Racing	65	(United Kingdom) Lilly Rhodes		1–3

Icon	Status
R	Rookie

== Calendar ==
The calendar was released on 2 December 2025.

Round	Circuit	Date	Support For	Map of circuit locations	
1†	(United Kingdom) Oulton Park, Little Budworth	2–4 May	British Superbike Championship	2026 Moto4 British Cup is located in the United Kingdom	2026 Moto4 British Cup is located in Netherlands
2	(United Kingdom) Donington Park, Castle Donington	15–17 May	British Superbike Championship	2026 Moto4 British Cup is located in the United Kingdom	2026 Moto4 British Cup is located in Netherlands
3	(United Kingdom) Snetterton Circuit, Snetterton	3–5 July	British Superbike Championship	2026 Moto4 British Cup is located in the United Kingdom	2026 Moto4 British Cup is located in Netherlands
4	(United Kingdom) Brands Hatch, West Kingsdown	17–19 July	British Superbike Championship	2026 Moto4 British Cup is located in the United Kingdom	2026 Moto4 British Cup is located in Netherlands
5	(United Kingdom) Silverstone Circuit, Silverstone	7–9 August	MotoGP World Championship	2026 Moto4 British Cup is located in the United Kingdom	2026 Moto4 British Cup is located in Netherlands
6	(United Kingdom) Thruxton Circuit, Thruxton	14–16 August	British Superbike Championship	2026 Moto4 British Cup is located in the United Kingdom	2026 Moto4 British Cup is located in Netherlands
7	(Netherlands) TT Circuit Assen, Assen	18–20 September	British Superbike Championship	2026 Moto4 British Cup is located in the United Kingdom	2026 Moto4 British Cup is located in Netherlands
8†	(United Kingdom) Donington Park, Castle Donington	2–4 October	British Superbike Championship	2026 Moto4 British Cup is located in the United Kingdom	2026 Moto4 British Cup is located in Netherlands

- † – Three-race round

== Race results ==
Round		Circuit	Pole position	Fastest lap	Winning rider
1	R1	(United Kingdom) Oulton Park, Little Budworth	(United Kingdom) Jack Dunabie	(United Kingdom) Ryan Frost	(United Kingdom) Jack Burrows
1	R2	(United Kingdom) Oulton Park, Little Budworth		(United Kingdom) Jack Dunabie	(United Kingdom) Ryan Frost
1	R3	(United Kingdom) Oulton Park, Little Budworth		(United Kingdom) Jack Burrows	(United Kingdom) Ryan Frost
2	R1	(United Kingdom) Donington Park, Castle Donington	(United Kingdom) Ryan Frost	(United Kingdom) Jack Dunabie	(United Kingdom) Jack Dunabie
2	R2	(United Kingdom) Donington Park, Castle Donington		(United Kingdom) Ryan Frost	(United Kingdom) Ryan Frost
3	R1	(United Kingdom) Snetterton Circuit, Snetterton	(United Kingdom) Jack Dunabie	(United Kingdom) Ryan Frost	(United Kingdom) Jack Dunabie
3	R2	(United Kingdom) Snetterton Circuit, Snetterton		(United Kingdom) Marco Holt	(United Kingdom) Jack Dunabie
4	R1	(United Kingdom) Brands Hatch, West Kingsdown	(United Kingdom) Ryan Frost	(United Kingdom) Marco Holt	(United Kingdom) Marco Holt
4	R2	(United Kingdom) Brands Hatch, West Kingsdown		(United Kingdom) Jack Dunabie	(United Kingdom) Jack Dunabie
5	R1	(United Kingdom) Silverstone Circuit, Silverstone	(United Kingdom) Harrison Day	(United Kingdom) Jack Dunabie	(United Kingdom) Ryan Frost
5	R2	(United Kingdom) Silverstone Circuit, Silverstone		(United Kingdom) Luke Fitchett	(United Kingdom) Ryan Frost
6	R1	(United Kingdom) Thruxton Circuit, Thruxton	(United Kingdom) Ryan Frost	(United Kingdom) Marco Holt	(United Kingdom) Ryan Frost
6	R2	(United Kingdom) Thruxton Circuit, Thruxton		(United Kingdom) Marco Holt	(United Kingdom) Ryan Frost
7	R1	(Netherlands) TT Circuit Assen, Assen	(United Kingdom) Jack Dunabie	(United Kingdom) Luke Fitchett	(United Kingdom) Marco Holt
7	R2	(Netherlands) TT Circuit Assen, Assen		(Spain) Álex Remesal	(United Kingdom) Jack Dunabie
8	R1	(United Kingdom) Donington Park, Castle Donington	(United Kingdom) Ryan Frost	(Spain) Álex Remesal	(United Kingdom) Jack Burrows
8	R2	(United Kingdom) Donington Park, Castle Donington		(United Kingdom) Marco Holt	(United Kingdom) Ryan Frost
8	R3	(United Kingdom) Donington Park, Castle Donington		(United Kingdom) Marco Holt	(United Kingdom) Jack Dunabie

== Championship standings ==
Scoring system
Points are awarded to the top fifteen finishers. A rider has to finish the race to earn points.

Position	1st	2nd	3rd	4th	5th	6th	7th	8th	9th	10th	11th	12th	13th	14th	15th
Points	25	20	16	13	11	10	9	8	7	6	5	4	3	2	1

Pos.	Rider	OUL (United Kingdom)			DON (United Kingdom)		SNE (United Kingdom)		BRH (United Kingdom)		SIL (United Kingdom)		THR (United Kingdom)		ASS (Netherlands)		DON (United Kingdom)			Pts
Pos.	Rider	R1	R2	R3	R1	R2	R1	R2	R1	R2	R1	R2	R1	R2	R1	R2	R1	R2	R3	Pts
1	(United Kingdom) Ryan Frost	3^{F}	1	1	3^{P}	1^{P F}	2^{F}	2^{P}	4^{P}	2	1	1	1^{P}	1^{P}	9	2	Ret^{P}	1	4	345
2	(United Kingdom) Jack Dunabie	2^{P}	4^{P F}	Ret^{P}	1^{F}	2	1^{P}	1	2	1^{F}	2^{F}	3^{P}	2	3	5^{P}	1	Ret	3	1	322
3	(United Kingdom) Jack Burrows	1	2	2^{F}	2	4	3	4	3	3	Ret	8	4	4	4	7	1	4	8	261
4	(United Kingdom) Marco Holt	4	3	Ret	13	5	5	3^{F}	1^{F}	4^{P}	6	2	3^{F}	2^{F}	1	3	Ret	2^{F}	2^{P F}	255
5	(United Kingdom) Tyler Humphries	12	12	Ret	9	13	4	6	9	10	4	4	8	5	7	5	3	8	8	150
6	(United Kingdom) Luke Fitchett	Ret	6	Ret	8	9	9	5	6	5	3	9^{F}	6	6	2^{F}	6^{P}	Ret	13	7	149
7	(United Kingdom) Mason Foster	5	5	Ret	7	3	6	9	12	Ret	5	5	5	Ret	3	8	Ret	6	5	146
8	(United Kingdom) Harrison Day	6	9	6	5	7	11	Ret	5	Ret	9^{P}	10	12	11	8	9	2	Ret	3	136
9	(United Kingdom) George Bowes	8	13	3	Ret	10	10	10	8	7	8	6	9	9	13	12	6	10	11	122
10	(Spain) Álex Remesal	11	14	DNS	16	14	7	8	7	8	7	7	10	7	15	4^{F}	Ret^{F}	5^{P}	6	111
11	(United Kingdom) Clayton Edmunds	Ret	Ret	Ret	4	6	8	7	10	6	10	11	7	8	Ret	11	DNS	DNS	DNS	89
12	(United Kingdom) Henry McCartney	9	8	Ret	6	8			15	13	12	Ret	13	13	16	15	4	7	10	76
13	(Bermuda) Aeziah Divine	Ret	10	4	DNS	15	13	13	11	9	11	Ret	14	14	12	14	5	12	12	72
14	(United Kingdom) Thorley Trevorrow	10	11	Ret	11	11	Ret	12	Ret	Ret	13	12	11	10	6	Ret	Ret	9	Ret	60
15	(United Kingdom) Joshua Williams	7	7	5	10	12			14	14	15	15	Ret	16	10	16	Ret	Ret	DNS	51
16	(United Kingdom) Hudson Cooper	Ret	DNS	DNS			12	11	Ret	11	Ret	13	15	12	11	10	7	11	13	50
17	(United Kingdom) Charlie Cunningham	13	15	7	12	19			19	20	17	18	17	18	17	Ret	8	14	15	28
18	(United Kingdom) Daniel Stephenson						15	15	13	12	14	14			14	19	9	15	14	25
19	(United Kingdom) Archie Hooper	14	Ret	8	15	17	16	17	16	16	16	16	Ret	17	20	18	10	18	16	17
20	(United Kingdom) Lilly Rhodes	15	16	10	14	18	17	16	17	17	20	17	18	19	Ret	17	Ret	16	Ret	9
21	(United Kingdom) Max Rhodes	16	17	9	17	20	18	18	18	18	18	Ret	19	20	21	20	Ret	17	17	7
22	(United Kingdom) Jensen Bishop	Ret	Ret	DNS	Ret	16	14	14	Ret	15										5
23	(Netherlands) Luuk Borggreve														18	13				3
24	(United Kingdom) Finley Polhill												16	15						1
25	(Republic of Ireland) Olly O'Gorman						19	19	20	19	19	19	20	21	19	21	DNS	DNS	DNS	0
26	(United Kingdom) Lucy Curtis	DNQ	DNQ	DNQ	Ret	Ret	20	20	DNQ	DNQ										0
Pos.	Rider	R1	R2	R3	R1	R2	R1	R2	R1	R2	R1	R2	R1	R2	R1	R2	R1	R2	R3	Pts
Pos.	Rider	OUL (United Kingdom)			DON (United Kingdom)		SNE (United Kingdom)		BRH (United Kingdom)		SIL (United Kingdom)		THR (United Kingdom)		ASS (Netherlands)		DON (United Kingdom)			Pts
