= 2023 British Talent Cup =

2023 British Talent Cup
Previous:	2022	Next:	2024
Support series: British Superbike Championship; British Supersport Championship; National Superstock; British Sportbike; National Junior Sporbike; BMW F 900 R Cup

The 2023 R&G Moto4 British Cup was the sixth season of the British Talent Cup. The riders used the Honda NSF250R.

== Calendar and results ==
2023 calendar
Round	Date	Circuit	Pole position	Fastest lap	Race winner	Sources
1	April 8	(England) Silverstone National	(United Kingdom) Amanuel Brinton	(United Kingdom) Ollie Walker	(United Kingdom) Harrison Dessoy	
1	April 9	(England) Silverstone National	(United Kingdom) Ollie Walker	(United Kingdom) Harrison Dessoy	(United Kingdom) Evan Belford	
2	May 20	(England) Donington Park National	(United Kingdom) Evan Belford	(United Kingdom) Ryan Frost	(United Kingdom) Sullivan Mounsey	
2	May 21	(England) Donington Park National	(United States) Julian Correa	(United Kingdom) Evan Belford	(United Kingdom) Harrison Dessoy	
3	June 17	(Scotland) Knockhill	(United Kingdom) Evan Belford	(United Kingdom) Amanuel Brinton	(United Kingdom) Amanuel Brinton	
3	June 18	(Scotland) Knockhill	(United Kingdom) Amanuel Brinton	(United Kingdom) Evan Belford	(United Kingdom) Evan Belford	
4	July 8	(England) Snetterton 300	(United Kingdom) Evan Belford	(United Kingdom) Evan Belford	(United Kingdom) Evan Belford	
4	July 9	(England) Snetterton 300	(United Kingdom) Evan Belford	(United Kingdom) Evan Belford	(United Kingdom) Evan Belford	
5	July 22	(England) Brands Hatch GP	(United Kingdom) Evan Belford	(United Kingdom) Evan Belford	(United Kingdom) Sullivan Mounsey	
5	July 23	(England) Brands Hatch GP	(United Kingdom) Evan Belford	(United Kingdom) Evan Belford	(United Kingdom) Evan Belford	
6	August 5	(England) Silverstone National	(United Kingdom) Evan Belford	(United Kingdom) Evan Belford	(United Kingdom) Sullivan Mounsey	
6	August 6	(England) Silverstone National	(United Kingdom) Evan Belford	(United Kingdom) Rhys Stephenson	(United Kingdom) Amanuel Brinton	
7	August 12	(England) Thruxton Circuit	(United Kingdom) Evan Belford	(United Kingdom) Evan Belford	(United Kingdom) Sullivan Mounsey	
7	August 13	(England) Thruxton Circuit	(United Kingdom) Evan Belford	(United Kingdom) Sullivan Mounsey	(United Kingdom) Amanuel Brinton	
8	September 16	(England) Oulton Park	(United Kingdom) Sullivan Mounsey	(United Kingdom) Evan Belford	(United Kingdom) Sullivan Mounsey	
8	September 17	(England) Oulton Park	(United Kingdom) Evan Belford	(United Kingdom) Amanuel Brinton	(United Kingdom) Amanuel Brinton	
9	September 30	(England) Donington Park National	(United Kingdom) Evan Belford	(United Kingdom) Harley McCabe	(Poland) Filip Surowiak	
9	October 1	(England) Donington Park National	(United Kingdom) Harley McCabe	(United Kingdom) Ronnie Harris	(United Kingdom) Ronnie Harris	

== Entry list ==
Team	No.	Rider	Rounds
Amphibian Scaffolding/SP125 Racing	29	(United Kingdom) Lucas Brown	All
Banks Racing	8	(United Kingdom) Alfie Davidson	All
Barnsdale Leisure / SP125 Racing	41	(United Kingdom) Luca Hopkins	2-3, 6-8
Belfast Chauffer Hire by WM-Racing	99	(Northern Ireland) Peter Willis	All
Dunsley Heat Racing	2	(United Kingdom) Josh Bannister	All
FS75Racing/Fab Racing	75	(Poland) Filip Surowiak	All
Jones Brothers Racing Team	11	(United Kingdom) Iwan Jones	All
Microlise Cresswell Racing	67	(United Kingdom) George Bowes	1-2, 4-9
Microlise Cresswell Racing	55	(United Kingdom) Harrison Dessoy	All
Microlise Cresswell Racing	40	(United States) Julian Correa	All
Microlise Cresswell Racing	88	(Ukraine) Sviatoslav Pylypenko	All
Microlise Cresswell Racing	12	(New Zealand) Tyler King	8-9
Mortimer Racing Victoria House Academy	7	(United Kingdom) Harley McCabe	All
Mortimer Racing Victoria House Academy	65	(Northern Ireland) Alexander Rowan	All
Mortimer Racing Victoria House Academy	70	(United Kingdom) Olly Horner	1-2
Mortimer Racing Victoria House Academy	5	(United Kingdom) Luke Scofield	4, 7-9
Opteven Mototechniks	76	(United Kingdom) Charlie Huntingford	All
RMB Racing	27	(United Kingdom) Ted Wilkinson	1-2
SMP Racing	19	(United Kingdom) Scott McPhee	All
Talentum Motosport/Azure Notions	28	(United Kingdom) Charlie Barnes	All
Talentum Motosport/Azure Notions	24	(United Kingdom) Ryan Frost	All
Talentum Motosport/Azure Notions	3	(Japan) Jean Turner	1
Talentum Motosport/Azure Notions	21	(United Kingdom) Troy Jeffrey	3
Team Harris/FAB Racing	66	(United Kingdom) Ronnie Harris	All
TBC	23	(United Kingdom) Rhys Stephenson	1, 3-9
TBC	43	(United Kingdom) Amanuel Brinton	1, 3-9
TBC	52	(United Kingdom) Evan Belford	All
TBC	64	(United Kingdom) Clayton Edmunds	All
VisionTrack Racing Team	22	(Republic of Ireland) Josh O'Brien	1
VisionTrack Racing Team	33	(United States) Elijah Banish	All
VisionTrack Racing Team	57	(United Kingdom) Johnny Garness	1
VisionTrack Racing Team	71	(United Kingdom) Daniel Goodman	All
Wright Morgan/SP125 Racing	48	(United Kingdom) Ollie Walker	All
Stiggy Motorsport	32	(United Kingdom) Ritchie O'Neil	3
Wilson Racing/Maddison Media	4	(United Kingdom) Sullivan Mounsey	All
Wilson Racing/Maddison Media	42	(United Kingdom) Ben Jolliffe	All
Wilson Racing/Maddison Media	61	(United Kingdom) Harrison MacKay	All
Wilson Racing/Maddison Media	95	(United Kingdom) Greg Marshall	8
Wilson Racing/Maddison Media	72	(United Kingdom) Samuel Munson	9

== Championship standings ==
Scoring system
Points are awarded to the top fifteen finishers. A rider has to finish the race to earn points.

Position	1st	2nd	3rd	4th	5th	6th	7th	8th	9th	10th	11th	12th	13th	14th	15th
Points	25	20	16	13	11	10	9	8	7	6	5	4	3	2	1

Pos.	Rider	SIL (United Kingdom)		DON (United Kingdom)		KNO (Scotland)		SNE (United Kingdom)		BRH (United Kingdom)		SIL (United Kingdom)		THR (United Kingdom)		OUL (United Kingdom)		DON (United Kingdom)		Pts
Pos.	Rider	R1	R2	R1	R2	R1	R2	R1	R2	R1	R2	R1	R2	R1	R2	R1	R2	R1	R2	Pts
1	(United Kingdom) Evan Belford	5	1	2^{P}	3^{F}	2^{P}	1^{F}	1^{P F}	1^{P F}	Ret^{P F}	1^{P F}	Ret^{P F}	2^{P}	3^{P F}	4^{P}	2^{F}	4^{P}	4^{P}	3	303
2	(United Kingdom) Sullivan Mounsey	Ret	5	1	Ret	3	3	5	10	1	3	1	Ret	1	3^{F}	1^{P}	2	Ret	2	257
3	(United Kingdom) Amanuel Brinton	2^{P}	2			1^{F}	2^{P}	2	Ret	8	Ret	4	1	2	1	Ret	1^{F}	Ret	9	228
4	(United Kingdom) Harley McCabe	4	6	Ret	2	6	4	4	5	2	2	2	4	7	Ret	8	9	3^{F}	Ret^{P}	203
5	(United States) Julian Correa	8	8	6	4^{P}	5	5	3	3	6	11	Ret	11	11	11	4	6	2	6	176
6	(United Kingdom) Lucas Brown	6	7	3	Ret	19	Ret	9	2	4	4	3	3	15	6	6	3	Ret	11	162
7	(United Kingdom) Ollie Walker	7^{F}	9^{P}	7	7	7	7	15	12	5	10	7	7	4	2	18	10	8	7	148
8	(United Kingdom) Ryan Frost	9	Ret	4^{F}	5	4	6	7	4	Ret	6	8	8	6	10	Ret	Ret	5	12	133
9	(United Kingdom) Harrison Dessoy	1	4^{F}	Ret	1	Ret	Ret	Ret	Ret	17	7	9	5	8	8	3	Ret	Ret	8	130
10	(Poland) Filip Surowiak	11	Ret	8	14	12	8	8	11	9	9	6	9	9	12	9	12	1	5	129
11	(United Kingdom) Ronnie Harris	24	20	14	12	9	Ret	12	16	13	5	14	Ret	13	13	5	5	Ret	1^{F}	86
12	(United Kingdom) Rhys Stephenson	Ret	DNS			DNS		6	7	Ret	8	5	6^{F}	5	14	Ret	11	6	DNS	76
13	(United Kingdom) Harrison MacKay	12	12	13	9	13	14	18	17	Ret	14	22	10	10	5	7	8	7	24	74
14	(Northern Ireland) Alexander Rowan	14	18	5	6	15	10	13	6	3	15	Ret	15	22	17	Ret	15	18	23	62
15	(United Kingdom) Alfie Davidson	13	Ret	Ret	Ret	10	Ret	11	9	7	DNS	10	12	16	18	10	7	Ret	Ret	55
16	(United Kingdom) Charlie Huntingford	10	14	9	8	11	13	17	NS	21	Ret	17	22	14	9	Ret	20	9	15	48
17	(United States) Elijah Banish	27	23	DNS	21	18	11	22	18	12	16	13	16	12	7	12	14	10	14	39
18	(United Kingdom) Scott McPhee	26	21	18	Ret	8	9	10	8	NS	Ret	11	17	18	27	Ret	19	19	16	34
19	(United Kingdom) Johnny Garness	3	3																	32
20	(United Kingdom) Clayton Edmunds	19	10	12	10	14	Ret	16	13	16	20	16	18	17	15	11	13	15	19	31
21	(United Kingdom) Josh Bannister	15	13	10	11	20	12	Ret	21	15	13	16	14	20	Ret	17	24	16	20	25
22	(Northern Ireland) Peter Willis	20	11	11	13	17	15	21	19	19	17	15	19	25	25	Ret	16	14	13	20
23	(United Kingdom) Ben Jolliffe	18	15	19	18	16	16	14	20	10	12	Ret	13	19	16	Ret	18	13	Ret	19
24	(United Kingdom) Daniel Goodman	21	22	15	17	DNS		24	22	14	22	19	21	24	22	14	22	17	4	18
25	(Ukraine) Sviatoslav Pylypenko	17	16	16	15	21	19	Ret	14	Ret	21	Ret	20	21	19	15	23	11	10	15
26	(United Kingdom) Charlie Barnes	29	Ret	Ret	Ret	22	18	19	15	11	18	12	Ret	23	20	20	Ret	Ret	21	10
27	(United Kingdom) George Bowes	28	24	17	16			20	23	20	19	20	Ret	Ret	23	16	21	12	17	4
28	(United Kingdom) Iwan Jones	23	Ret	20	19	DNS	Ret	23	Ret	18	Ret	21	23	27	21	13	17	Ret	Ret	3
	(United Kingdom) Olly Horner	25	Ret	22	DNS															0
	(United Kingdom) Luca Hopkins			21	20	DNS						23	24	26	24	19	27			0
	(United Kingdom) Ted Wilkinson	16	19	Ret	Ret															0
	(Republic of Ireland) Josh O'Brien	30	Ret																	0
	(Japan) Jean Turner	22	17																	0
	(United Kingdom) Troy Jeffrey					DSQ	17													0
	(United Kingdom) Ritchie O'Neil					23	NC													0
	(United Kingdom) Luke Scofield							DNS						28	26	21	25	DNS	Ret	0
	(New Zealand) Tyler King															22	Ret	20	18	0
	(United Kingdom) Greg Marshall															23	26			0
	(United Kingdom) Samuel Munson																	21	22	0
