= 2022 British Talent Cup =

2022 British Talent Cup
Previous:	2021	Next:	2023
Support series: British Superbike Championship; British Supersport Championship; Superstock 1000; Superstock 600; Junior Supersport; Ducati TriOptions Cup

The 2022 Honda British Talent Cup was the fifth season of the British Talent Cup. The riders used the Honda NSF250R.

== Calendar and results ==
2022 calendar
Round	Date	Circuit	Pole position	Fastest lap	Race winner	Sources
1	April 16	(England) Silverstone National	(United Kingdom) Johnny Garness	(United Kingdom) Carter Brown	(United Kingdom) Johnny Garness	
1	April 17	(England) Silverstone National	(United Kingdom) Carter Brown	(United States) Julian Correa	(Netherlands) Kiyano Veijer	
2	May 1	(England) Oulton Park	(United Kingdom) Carter Brown	(United Kingdom) Harley McCabe	(United Kingdom) Johnny Garness	
2	May 2	(England) Oulton Park	(United Kingdom) Harley McCabe	(United Kingdom) Johnny Garness	(United Kingdom) Harrison Dessoy	
3	May 21	(England) Donington Park National	(United Kingdom) Johnny Garness	(United Kingdom) Rhys Stephenson	(United Kingdom) Carter Brown	
3	May 22	(England) Donington Park National	(United Kingdom) Rhys Stephenson	(United Kingdom) Sullivan Mounsey	(United Kingdom) Johnny Garness and (United Kingdom) Carter Brown (DH)	
4	June 18	(Scotland) Knockhill	(United Kingdom) Johnny Garness	(United Kingdom) Johnny Garness	(United Kingdom) Evan Belford	
4	June 19	(Scotland) Knockhill	(United Kingdom) Johnny Garness	(United Kingdom) Carter Brown	(United Kingdom) Johnny Garness	
5	July 23	(England) Brands Hatch GP	(United Kingdom) Johnny Garness	(United Kingdom) Johnny Garness	(United Kingdom) Johnny Garness	
5	July 24	(England) Brands Hatch GP	(United Kingdom) Johnny Garness	(United Kingdom) Johnny Garness	(United Kingdom) Johnny Garness	
6	August 6	(England) Silverstone National	(United Kingdom) Johnny Garness	(United Kingdom) Rhys Stephenson	(United Kingdom) Johnny Garness	
6	August 7	(England) Silverstone National	(United Kingdom) Rhys Stephenson	(United Kingdom) Johnny Garness	(United Kingdom) Johnny Garness	
7	August 13	(England) Thruxton Circuit	(United Kingdom) Johnny Garness	(United Kingdom) Rhys Stepheson	(United Kingdom) Johnny Garness	
7	August 14	(England) Thruxton Circuit	(United Kingdom) Rhys Stephenson	(United Kingdom) Johnny Garness	(United Kingdom) Johnny Garness	
8	September 10	(England) Snetterton 300	(United Kingdom) Evan Belford	(United Kingdom) Rhys Stephenson	(United Kingdom) Johnny Garness	
8	September 11	(England) Snetterton 300	(United Kingdom) Rhys Stephenson	(United Kingdom) Carter Brown	(United Kingdom) Johnny Garness	
9	October 1	(England) Donington Park GP	(United Kingdom) Evan Belford	(United Kingdom) Rhys Stephenson	(United Kingdom) Evan Belford	
9	October 2	(England) Donington Park GP	(United Kingdom) Rhys Stephenson	(United Kingdom) Carter Brown	(United Kingdom) Evan Belford	

== Entry list ==
Team	No.	Rider	Rounds
Ashcourt Racing	44	(United Kingdom) Lucas Hill	1-4, 6, 8-9
Astro-JJR Racing	2	(United Kingdom) Josh Bannister	All
B Moore Honda	8	(Northern Ireland) Ross Moore	1-3
Banks Racing	15	(United Kingdom) Harrison Crosby	All
City Lifting by RS Racing	43	(United Kingdom) Ryan Hitchcock	All
City Lifting by RS Racing	52	(United Kingdom) Evan Belford	4-9
Davidson / Pete Banks Racing	28	(United Kingdom) Alfie Davidson	All
Ernst Dubbink Eveno Racing	22	(Netherlands) Maik Duin	1-4
FHO Racing	51	(United Kingdom) Holly Harris	All
Microlise Cresswell Racing	40	(United States) Julian Correa	All
Microlise Cresswell Racing	53	(Netherlands) Kiyano Veijer	1-7, 9
Microlise Cresswell Racing	84	(United Kingdom) Matthew Ruisbroek	1-2, 5-7, 9
Microlise Cresswell Racing / Eastern Garage Racing	55	(United Kingdom) Harrison Dessoy	All
MJL Racing	64	(United Kingdom) Clayton Edmunds	All
MJL Racing	75	(Poland) Filip Surowiak	All
MLav VisionTrack Academy	57	(United Kingdom) Johnny Garness	All
MLav VisionTrack Academy	71	(United Kingdom) Daniel Goodman	All
MLav VisionTrack Academy	74	(United Kingdom) Carter Brown	All
MLav VisionTrack Academy	79	(United Kingdom) Harley McCabe	1-2, 5-9
MLav VisionTrack Academy	99	(Northern Ireland) Peter Willis	1-2, 4-9
Mortimer Racing / Victoria House Academy	21	(United Kingdom) Troy Jeffrey	1
Mortimer Racing / Victoria House Academy	32	(United Kingdom) Amanuel Brinton	5, 7
Mortimer Racing / Victoria House Academy	65	(Northern Ireland) Alexander Rowan	1-8
Mortimer Racing / Victoria House Academy	70	(United Kingdom) Olly Horner	2-9
NWRacing	35	(United Kingdom) Zack Weston	1-2
RMB Racing	27	(United Kingdom) Ted Wilkinson	1-6, 8-9
Rocket Racing	23	(United Kingdom) Rhys Stephenson	All
SMP Racing	19	(United Kingdom) Scott McPhee	1, 4, 9
SP125	48	(United Kingdom) Ollie Walker	All
SP125 / Amphibian Scaffolding	29	(United Kingdom) Lucas Brown	All
SP125 / Barnsdale Leisure	41	(United Kingdom) Luca Hopkins	1-3, 5, 8-9
Team 151s / Lextek	5	(United Kingdom) Mason Johnson	2-3, 5-9
Team 151s / Lextek	9	(United Kingdom) Bailey Stuart-Campbell	1-6, 8-9
ThorneyCroft56 Racing	21	(United Kingdom) Troy Jeffrey	2-9
ThorneyCroft56 Racing	33	(United States) Elijah Banish	1-7
ThorneyCroft56 Racing	90	(United Kingdom) Kalvin Kelly	1-6
Wilson Racing	42	(United Kingdom) Ben Jolliffe	3
Wilson Racing / J&S Accessories	4	(United Kingdom) Sullivan Mounsey	3-9
Wilson Racing / Super Soco	61	(United Kingdom) Harrison Mackay	All
WMS Mototechniks	76	(United Kingdom) Charlie Huntingford	All

== Championship standings ==
Scoring system
Points are awarded to the top fifteen finishers. A rider has to finish the race to earn points.

Position	1st	2nd	3rd	4th	5th	6th	7th	8th	9th	10th	11th	12th	13th	14th	15th
Points	25	20	16	13	11	10	9	8	7	6	5	4	3	2	1

Pos.	Rider	SIL (United Kingdom)		OUL (United Kingdom)		DON (United Kingdom)		KNO (Scotland)		BRH (United Kingdom)		SIL (United Kingdom)		THR (United Kingdom)		SNE (United Kingdom)		DON (United Kingdom)		Pts
Pos.	Rider	R1	R2	R1	R2	R1	R2^{*}	R1	R2	R1	R2	R1	R2	R1	R2	R1	R2	R1	R2	Pts
1	(United Kingdom) Johnny Garness	1^{P}	Ret	1	3^{F}	2^{P}	1	Ret^{P F}	1^{P}	1^{P F}	1^{P F}	1^{P}	1^{F}	1^{P}	1^{F}	1	1^{F}	DNS	DNS	336
2	(United Kingdom) Carter Brown	3^{F}	Ret^{P}	3^{P}	6	1	1	Ret	2^{F}	3	Ret	5	4	2	2	Ret	Ret	2	2^{F}	232
3	(United Kingdom) Harrison Crosby	2	2	Ret	Ret	10	11	Ret	8	2	4	9	8	5	5	3	3	5	7	181
4	(United Kingdom) Rhys Stephenson	6	Ret	Ret	2	Ret^{F}	9^{P}	6	6	8	9	2^{F}	2^{P}	3^{F}	4^{P}	2^{F}	Ret^{P}	Ret^{F}	3^{P}	177
5	(United Kingdom) Lucas Brown	13	11	6	10	8	10	7	9	9	7	6	7	8	7	4	8	4	5	151
6	(United Kingdom) Harrison Dessoy	11	5	5	1	3	6	8	5	5	Ret	4	5	Ret	DNS	Ret	Ret	9	12	143
7	(United Kingdom) Evan Belford							1	Ret	24	3	Ret	14	7	3	12^{P}	2	1^{P}	1	142
8	(Netherlands) Kiyano Veijer	4	1	2	4	Ret	3	5	4	10	6	11	Ret	DNS	DNS			21	10	138
9	(United Kingdom) Ryan Hitchcock	5	10	8	13	4	7	11	11	7	5	Ret	Ret	12	Ret	6	7	Ret	17	103
10	(United Kingdom) Matthew Ruisbroek	9	6	7	5					4	2	7	10	4	Ret			16	Ret	98
11	(United Kingdom) Harley McCabe	Ret	8	4^{F}	9^{P}					DNS		3	3	Ret	14	9	Ret	3	6	95
12	(United States) Julian Correa	7	3^{F}	Ret	8	6	8	9	14	11	10	12	9	NC	13	17	14	17	11	92
13	(United Kingdom) Sullivan Mounsey					5	5^{F}	2	Ret	DNS	11	8	Ret	9	12	15	Ret	8	4	88
14	(United Kingdom) Harrison MacKay	Ret	7	9	11	12	12	12	10	6	8	17	13	10	9	14	6	Ret	Ret	85
15	(United Kingdom) Bailey Stuart-Campbell	Ret	15	Ret	7	7	4	4	7	DNS	16	Ret	Ret			7	10	11	16	74
16	(United Kingdom) Clayton Edmunds	10	4	Ret	15	11	14	14	12	DNS	14	10	6	11	8	16	11	26	20	69
17	(United Kingdom) Ollie Walker	12	14	11	14	15	18	13	17	14	12	14	12	14	10	10	9	18	14	52
18	(Poland) Filip Surowiak	22	23	Ret	17	21	24	16	15	DNS	20	15	Ret	18	22	5	4	6	8	44
19	(United Kingdom) Daniel Goodman	14	13	Ret	16	13	15	Ret	24	21	24	Ret	22	16	15	8	5	10	Ret	35
20	(United Kingdom) Troy Jeffrey	26	26	16	22	26	19	3	3	15	17	19	20	21	20	25	20	19	Ret	33
21	(United Kingdom) Luca Hopkins	DSQ	12	Ret	12	9	13	DNS	DNS	17	21					11	12	12	Ret	31
22	(Northern Ireland) Peter Willis	8	9	DNS	DNS			20	18	19	19	13	11	19	16	21	17	14	15	26
23	(United Kingdom) Josh Bannister	17	20	17	Ret	19	22	21	25	12	13	18	16	13	11	13	13	22	18	21
24	(United Kingdom) Amanuel Brinton									Ret	Ret			6	6					20
25	(Northern Ireland) Alexander Rowan	16	Ret	10	18	22	25	10	13	DNS	15	21	15	15	17	20	Ret			18
26	(United Kingdom) James Cook															18	15	7	9	17
27	(United Kingdom) Charlie Huntingford	21	16	14	24	23	20	Ret	DNS	23	25	18	21	17	19	19	16	13	13	8
28	(United Kingdom) Kalvin Kelly	24	25	Ret	Ret	14	Ret	15	16	13	Ret	27	19							6
29	(United States) Elijah Banish	23	Ret	12	25	24	23	Ret	23	16	18	26	26	22	21					4
30	(United Kingdom) Lucas Hill	15	21	13	21	18	21	17	21	DNS	DNS	22	23			27	24	25	24	4
31	(United Kingdom) Alfie Davidson	18	17	Ret	20	25	17	23	Ret	18	Ret	23	16	24	24	23	21	15	19	1
32	(United Kingdom) Ted Wilkinson	Ret	18	15	Ret	16	Ret	Ret	20	20	27	20	17			22	18	24	22	1
	(Netherlands) Maik Duin	19	19	Ret	19	17	16	18	DNS											0
	(United Kingdom) Olly Horner			19	27	28	27	25	26	22	23	24	24	23	23	28	23	28	23	0
	(United Kingdom) Zack Weston	Ret	27	Ret	23															0
	(United Kingdom) Scott McPhee	25	22					22	22									29	25	0
	(United Kingdom) Holly Harris	20	24	DNS	26	29	28	24	27	DNS	26	28	27	25	25	29	26	DNS		0
	(United Kingdom) Mason Johnson			Ret	DNS	20	26			Ret	26	25	25	20	18	24	19	20	Ret	0
	(United Kingdom) Ben Jolliffe					27	29													0
	(Northern Ireland) Ross Moore	DNS		18	28	30	30													0

* J.Garness & C.Brown declared a dead heat for 1st - both score 25 points with no 2nd place awarded
