= 2024 British Talent Cup =

Seventh season of the British Talent Cup

2024 British Talent Cup
Previous:	2023	Next:	2025
Support series: British Superbike Championship; British Supersport Championship; BMW Motorrad Cup; National Sportbike Championship; Kawasaki British Superteen Championship

The 2024 R&G Moto4 British Cup was the seventh season of the British Talent Cup. The riders used the Honda NSF250R.

== Calendar and results ==
2024 Calendar
Round	Date	Circuit	Pole position	Fastest lap	Race winner	Sources
1	April 20	(Spain) Circuito de Navarra	(United States) Julian Correa	(United Kingdom) Amanuel Brinton	(United States) Julian Correa	
1	April 21	(Spain) Circuito de Navarra	(United Kingdom) Amanuel Brinton	(Poland) Filip Surowiak	(Poland) Filip Surowiak	
1	April 21	(Spain) Circuito de Navarra	(Poland) Filip Surowiak	(United Kingdom) Amanuel Brinton	(United Kingdom) Lucas Brown	
2	May 18	(England) Donington Park National	(United States) Julian Correa	(Poland) Filip Surowiak	(United Kingdom) Amanuel Brinton	
2	May 19	(England) Donington Park National	(Poland) Filip Surowiak	(United Kingdom) Amanuel Brinton	(United Kingdom) Ryan Frost	
3	July 6	(England) Snetterton 300	(Poland) Filip Surowiak	(United Kingdom) Peter Willis	(United Kingdom) Lucas Brown	
3	July 7	(England) Snetterton 300	(United Kingdom) Peter Willis	(United Kingdom) Amanuel Brinton	(United Kingdom) Amanuel Brinton	
4	July 20	(England) Brands Hatch GP	(United Kingdom) Lucas Brown	(United Kingdom) Amanuel Brinton	(United Kingdom) Ryan Frost	
4	July 21	(England) Brands Hatch GP	(United Kingdom) Amanuel Brinton	(United Kingdom) Amanuel Brinton	(United Kingdom) Amanuel Brinton	
5	August 3	(England) Silverstone National	(United Kingdom) Amanuel Brinton	(Poland) Filip Surowiak	(United Kingdom) Ryan Frost	
5	August 4	(England) Silverstone National	(Poland) Filip Surowiak	(United States) Julian Correa	(Poland) Filip Surowiak	
6	August 10	(England) Thruxton Circuit	(United Kingdom) Amanuel Brinton	(Argentina) Marco Morelli	(Argentina) Marco Morelli	
6	August 11	(England) Thruxton Circuit	(Argentina) Marco Morelli	(United Kingdom) Amanuel Brinton	(Argentina) Marco Morelli	
7	September 14	(England) Oulton Park	(United Kingdom) Lucas Brown	(United Kingdom) Ryan Frost	(United Kingdom) Ryan Frost	
7	September 15	(England) Oulton Park	(United Kingdom) Ryan Frost	(United Kingdom) Amanuel Brinton	(United States) Julian Correa	
8	September 28	(England) Donington Park National	(United Kingdom) Ryan Frost	(United Kingdom) Lucas Brown	(United Kingdom) Lucas Brown	
8	September 29	(England) Donington Park National	(United Kingdom) Lucas Brown	(United States) Julian Correa	(United Kingdom) Harley McCabe	
8	September 29	(England) Donington Park National	(United States) Julian Correa	(United Kingdom) Ryan Frost	(United Kingdom) Ryan Frost	

== Entry list ==
Team	No.	Rider	Rounds
Alexander Rowan Racing	65	(United Kingdom) Alexander Rowan	1-3, 5-8
BRP Racing	88	(United Kingdom) Mason Foster	All
Burrows Engineering / RK Racing	16	(United Kingdom) Jack Burrows	All
Fibre Tec Honda	48	(United Kingdom) Ollie Walker	1-4, 7-8
Fibre Tec Honda	71	(United Kingdom) Daniel Goodman	All
Fibre Tec Honda	91	(United States) Joshua Raymond Jr	All
Fibre Tec Honda	24	(United Kingdom) Ryan Frost	All
Fibre Tec Honda	2	(United Kingdom) Josh Bannister	All
Fibre Tec Honda	33	(United States) Eli Banish	1-6
Fibre Tec Honda	95	(Argentina) Marco Morelli	6
Illusion Racing	82	(United Kingdom) Kyle Payne	3-6, 8
Jones Brothers Racing	11	(United Kingdom) Iwan Jones	All
Kovara Projects/Rs Racing	66	(United Kingdom) Ronnie Harris	1-2, 5-7
Kovara Projects/Rs Racing	43	(United Kingdom) Amanuel Brinton	All
McCabe Racing by Motorbike Buyers	7	(United Kingdom) Harley McCabe	All
Microlise Cresswell Racing	40	(United States) Julian Correa	All
Microlise Cresswell Racing	99	(United Kingdom) Peter Willis	All
Microlise Cresswell Racing	67	(United Kingdom) George Bowes	All
Microlise Cresswell Racing	12	(New Zealand) Tyler King	1-3
Microlise Cresswell Racing	90	(Bermuda) Aeziah Divine	1-2, 4-6
Mototechniks	76	(United Kingdom) Charlie Huntingford	1-2, 7-8
SENCAT Talent Team/Mortimer Racing	29	(United Kingdom) Lucas Brown	All
SENCAT Talent Team/Mortimer Racing	28	(United Kingdom) Charlie Barnes	1-2, 4-8
SMP Racing	19	(United Kingdom) Scott McPhee	All
Team City Lifting / RS Racing	75	(Poland) Filip Surowiak	All
Team City Lifting / RS Racing	64	(United Kingdom) Clayton Edmunds	All
Team Harris Racing/RS Racing	14	(United Kingdom) Bill Harris	All
Team Marshall Racing	20	(United Kingdom) Greg Marshall	6
WCS Racing	45	(Republic of Ireland) Finnan Wherity	7
Wilson Racing/HMR	42	(United Kingdom) Ben Jolliffe	All
Wilson Racing/HMR	72	(United Kingdom) Samuel Munson	1-2, 4-5
Wilson Racing/HMR	61	(United Kingdom) Harrison MacKay	All
Wilson Racing/HMR	13	(India) Raheesh Khatri	1
Wilson Racing/JBR	22	(United Kingdom) Jensen Bishop	8

== Championship standings ==
Scoring system
Points are awarded to the top fifteen finishers. A rider has to finish the race to earn points.

Position	1st	2nd	3rd	4th	5th	6th	7th	8th	9th	10th	11th	12th	13th	14th	15th
Points	25	20	16	13	11	10	9	8	7	6	5	4	3	2	1

Pos.	Rider	NAV (Spain)			DON (United Kingdom)		SNE (United Kingdom)		BRH (United Kingdom)		SIL (United Kingdom)		THR (United Kingdom)		OUL (United Kingdom)		DON (United Kingdom)			Pts
Pos.	Rider	R1	R2	R3	R1	R2	R1	R2	R1	R2	R1	R2	R1	R2	R1	R2	R1	R2	R3	Pts
1	(United Kingdom) Lucas Brown	2	4	1	3	2	1	2	3^{P}	2	2	3	5	4	3^{P}	Ret	1^{F}	Ret^{P}	8	284
2	(United Kingdom) Amanuel Brinton	Ret^{F}	3^{P}	2^{F}	1	3^{F}	4	1^{F}	4^{F}	1^{P F}	4^{P}	2	Ret^{P}	5^{F}	6	3^{F}	3	4	4	265
3	(United Kingdom) Ryan Frost	3	6	5	4	1	Ret	5	1	4	1	4	2	Ret	1^{F}	5	Ret^{P}	2	1^{F}	263
4	(United States) Julian Correa	1^{P}	2	Ret	2^{P}	Ret	6	3	5	5	3	5^{F}	3	3	2	1	5	3^{F}	5^{P}	255
5	(Poland) Filip Surowiak	Ret	1^{F}	4^{P}	6^{F}	Ret^{P}	Ret^{P}	4	2	3	13^{F}	1^{P}	4	2	4	2	2	Ret	3	227
6	(United Kingdom) Harley McCabe	5	17	11	7	7	Ret	9	8	6	12	DNS	DNS		7	4	4	1	2	143
7	(United Kingdom) Clayton Edmunds	4	10	8	8	6	14	14	10	17	9	7	11	8	12	6	9	5	12	120
8	(United Kingdom) Harrison MacKay	12	12	13	12	8	12	8	6	7	5	8	7	7	5	11	Ret	NS	6	117
9	(United Kingdom) Mason Foster	Ret	5	3	11	16	10	6	14	12	6	6	8	12	11	Ret	11	7	9	112
10	(United Kingdom) Ronnie Harris	6	8	6	5	5			7	8	10	Ret	6	6	8	Ret				101
11	(United Kingdom) Scott McPhee	14	20	16	18	10	Ret	16	12	9	7	9	10	10	10	12	12	8	7	78
12	(United Kingdom) George Bowes	10	15	17	9	9	8	10	9	Ret	8	Ret	Ret	14	9	9	7	Ret	14	77
13	(United Kingdom) Jack Burrows	NS	11	9	24	Ret	3	18	18	14	15	12	16	13	16	7	8	Ret	13	58
14	(United Kingdom) Peter Willis	7	19	12	16	12	2^{F}	19^{P}	20	20	21	14	18	19	20	8	17	11	10	58
15	(United Kingdom) Ollie Walker	Ret	7	7	10	4	11	13	Ret	DNS					15	Ret	15	10	16	53
16	(Argentina) Marco Morelli												1^{F}	1^{P}						50
17	(United States) Joshua Raymond Jr	11	18	19	14	17	15	15	11	10	14	13	9	9	19	14	21	16	21	41
18	(United Kingdom) Alexander Rowan	13	14	18	19	13	9	Ret			Ret	18	19	17	13	10	10	6	19	40
19	(United Kingdom) Daniel Goodman	8	16	15	Ret	14	5	20	22	19	18	11	13	11	23	Ret	18	13	20	38
20	(United Kingdom) Kyle Payne						16	Ret	13	11	11	10	12	16			16	9	17	30
21	(United Kingdom) Charlie Huntingford	Ret	9	10	13	11									DNS		22	15	22	22
22	(United Kingdom) Ben Jolliffe	9	13	14	21	18	Ret	17	19	18	19	19	15	15	18	Ret	13	12	Ret	21
23	(United Kingdom) Bill Harris	17	22	23	22	19	Ret	7	15	Ret	20	15	14	Ret	17	13	14	Ret	15	19
24	(United Kingdom) Charlie Barnes	Ret	26	Ret	23	Ret			Ret	Ret	16	Ret	DNS		14	Ret	6	Ret	11	17
25	(United States) Eli Banish	15	21	20	20	21	7	12	16	13	22	17	17	20						17
26	(United Kingdom) Josh Bannister	NS	DNS		15	15	Ret	11	17	15	17	Ret	Ret	21	21	16	19	14	18	10
27	(New Zealand) Tyler King	19	24	Ret	26	22	13	Ret												3
28	(Republic of Ireland) Finnan Wherity														24	15				1
	(United Kingdom) Samuel Munson	16	DNS	22	25	20			Ret	Ret	24	21								0
	(United Kingdom) Iwan Jones	18	23	Ret	17	Ret	Ret	21	21	16	23	16	Ret	Ret	22	17	20	Ret	23	0
	(Bermuda) Aeziah Divine	27	25	21	27	23			23	21	25	20	20	Ret						0
	(India) Raheesh Khatri	Ret	27	NS																0
	(United Kingdom) Greg Marshall												21	18						0
	(United Kingdom) Jensen Bishop																Ret	DNS		0
