= 2025 British Talent Cup =

Eighth season of the British Talent Cup

2025 British Talent Cup
Previous:	2024	Next:	2026
Support series: British Superbike Championship; British Supersport Championship; BMW Motorrad Cup; National Sportbike Championship; Kawasaki British Superteen Championship

The 2025 R&G Moto4 British Cup was the eight season of the British Talent Cup. The riders used the Honda NSF250R.

== Calendar and results ==
2025 Calendar
Round	Date	Circuit	Pole position	Fastest lap	Race winner	Sources
1	May 17	(England) Donington Park National	(Poland) Filip Surowiak	(United Kingdom) Jack Dunabie	(Poland) Filip Surowiak	
1	May 18	(England) Donington Park National	(United Kingdom) Jack Dunabie	(United Kingdom) Ethan Sparks	(Poland) Filip Surowiak	
2	May 24	(England) Silverstone National	(Poland) Filip Surowiak	(United Kingdom) Harrison MacKay	(Poland) Filip Surowiak	
2	May 25	(England) Silverstone National	(United Kingdom) Harrison MacKay	(United Kingdom) Peter Willis	(United Kingdom) Peter Willis	
3	June 21	(England) Snetterton 300	(Poland) Filip Surowiak	(Poland) Filip Surowiak	(United Kingdom) Ryan Frost	
3	June 22	(England) Snetterton 300	(Poland) Filip Surowiak	(Poland) Filip Surowiak	(Poland) Filip Surowiak	
4	July 26	(England) Brands Hatch GP	(United Kingdom) Ethan Sparks	(United Kingdom) Ethan Sparks	(United Kingdom) Ethan Sparks	
4	July 27	(England) Brands Hatch GP	(United Kingdom) Ethan Sparks	(United Kingdom) Jack Dunabie	(United Kingdom) Ethan Sparks	
5	August 9	(England) Thruxton Circuit	(Poland) Filip Surowiak	(United Kingdom) Ethan Sparks	(Poland) Filip Surowiak	
5	August 10	(England) Thruxton Circuit	(United Kingdom) Ethan Sparks	(Poland) Filip Surowiak	(Poland) Filip Surowiak	
6	September 6	(England) Donington Park National	(United Kingdom) Ethan Sparks	(Poland) Filip Surowiak	(United Kingdom) Ethan Sparks	
6	September 7	(England) Donington Park National	(Poland) Filip Surowiak	(United Kingdom) Clayton Edmunds	(United Kingdom) Ethan Sparks	
6	September 7	(England) Donington Park National	(United Kingdom) Clayton Edmunds	(United Kingdom) Ryan Frost	(United Kingdom) Ryan Frost	
7	September 20	(Netherlands) Assen	(United Kingdom) Ethan Sparks	(United Kingdom) Clayton Edmunds	(United Kingdom) Ethan Sparks	
7	September 21	(Netherlands) Assen	(United Kingdom) Clayton Edmunds	(United Kingdom) Jack Dunabie	(United Kingdom) Jack Dunabie	
8	October 4	(England) Oulton Park	(Poland) Filip Surowiak	(United Kingdom) Jack Dunabie	(United Kingdom) Jack Dunabie	
8	October 5	(England) Oulton Park	(United Kingdom) Jack Dunabie	(United Kingdom) Ryan Frost	(United Kingdom) Ethan Sparks	
8	October 5	(England) Oulton Park	(United Kingdom) Ryan Frost	(Poland) Filip Surowiak	(Poland) Filip Surowiak	

== Entry list ==
Team	No.	Rider	Rounds
A. Edwards Racing / JTL GB67	67	(United Kingdom) George Bowes	All
Burrows Engineering / RK Racing	16	(United Kingdom) Jack Burrows	All
BWR Racing	8	(United Kingdom) Blake Wilson	3-6
City Lifting Team	75	(Poland) Filip Surowiak	All
Clayton Edmunds	64	(United Kingdom) Clayton Edmunds	All
DANCOOPERMOTORSPORTS	43	(United Kingdom) Ben Hardwick	All
FibreTec Honda by MLAV Racing	24	(United Kingdom) Ryan Frost	All
FibreTec Honda by MLAV Racing	71	(United Kingdom) Daniel Goodman	All
FibreTec Honda by MLAV Racing	91	(United States) Joshua Raymond Jr	All
FibreTec Honda by MLAV Racing	90	(Bermuda) Aeziah Divine	All
FibreTec Honda by MLAV Racing	15	(United Kingdom) Lucy Curtis	8
Halo Racing	82	(United Kingdom) Kyle Payne	1-3. 5
Holmes Plant Mototechniks Racing	76	(United Kingdom) Charlie Huntingford	1-4, 6-8
INCOMPETITION/SENCAT	28	(United Kingdom) Charlie Barnes	1
JCRSupersport / Mortimer Racing Victoria House Academy	34	(United Kingdom) Charlie Cunningham	8
Kovara Projects / RS Racing	61	(United Kingdom) Harrison MacKay	All
Kovara Projects / RS Racing	62	(United Kingdom) Ethan Sparks	All
Kovara Projects / RS Racing	63	(United Kingdom) Jack Dunabie	All
Mortimer Racing	40	(United States) Julian Correa	1-6
Mortimer Racing	66	(United Kingdom) Alexander Rowan	1-5, 7-8
Mortimer Racing	88	(United Kingdom) Mason Foster	All
PRTGP Racing	78	(United Kingdom) Joshua Williams	4-8
Rocket Racing	18	(United Kingdom) Daniel Stephenson	All
SMP Racing	19	(United Kingdom) Scott McPhee	All
Wilson Racing	11	(United Kingdom) Jensen Bishop	All
Wilson Racing	12	(United Kingdom) Lewis Mullen	All
Wilson Racing	42	(United Kingdom) Ben Jolliffe	All
Wilson Racing	65	(United Kingdom) Lilly Rhodes	All
Wilson Racing	72	(United Kingdom) Samuel Munson	All
Wilson Racing	58	(United Kingdom) Max Rhodes	6,8
WM Racing	99	(United Kingdom) Peter Willis	All

== Championship standings ==
Scoring system
Points are awarded to the top fifteen finishers. A rider has to finish the race to earn points.

Position	1st	2nd	3rd	4th	5th	6th	7th	8th	9th	10th	11th	12th	13th	14th	15th
Points	25	20	16	13	11	10	9	8	7	6	5	4	3	2	1

Pos.	Rider	DON (United Kingdom)		SIL (United Kingdom)		SNE (United Kingdom)		BRH (United Kingdom)		THR (United Kingdom)		DON (United Kingdom)			ASS (Netherlands)		OUL (United Kingdom)			Pts
Pos.	Rider	R1	R2	R1	R2	R1	R2	R1	R2	R1	R2	R1	R2	R3	R1	R2	R1	R2	R3	Pts
1	(United Kingdom) Ethan Sparks	4	2^{F}	Ret	4	Ret	2	1^{P F}	1^{P}	2^{F}	5^{P}	1^{P}	1	2	1^{P}	2	2	1	2	327
2	(Poland) Filip Surowiak	1^{P}	1	1^{P}	Ret	Ret^{P F}	1^{P F}	3	4	1^{P}	1^{F}	3^{F}	2^{P}	3	3	4	3^{P}	4	1^{F}	314
3	(United Kingdom) Ryan Frost	3	5	3	2	1	3	5	5	4	3	2	Ret	1^{F}	2	3	5	2^{F}	3^{P}	283
4	(United Kingdom) Jack Dunabie	6^{F}	4^{P}	10	3	DSQ	8	2	3^{F}	7	9	7	3	7	4	1^{F}	1^{F}	6^{P}	5	223
5	(United Kingdom) Harrison MacKay	2	3	2^{F}	7^{P}	DSQ	5	4	2	3	2	4	Ret	5	Ret	7	4	5	10	208
6	(United Kingdom) Mason Foster	5	Ret	6	9	2	4	9	6	5	6	6	Ret	4	6	6	11	3	4	176
7	(United Kingdom) Peter Willis	7	6	5	1^{F}	7	9	8	Ret	10	10	5	5	11	9	10	8	14	17	141
8	(United States) Joshua Raymond Jr	13	Ret	14	5	4	7	10	9	8	4	Ret	7	10	10	8	7	11	9	122
9	(United Kingdom) Clayton Edmunds	9	8	7	Ret	DSQ	Ret	6	7	9	7	8	4	9	7	5	NS	13	12	114
10	(United States) Julian Correa	8	Ret	4	Ret	3	6	7	8	6	8	10	6	13						101
11	(United Kingdom) Ben Jolliffe	11	Ret	11	8	9	12	13	11	11	11	12	11	14	11	11	10	7	7	92
12	(United Kingdom) Jack Burrows	14	10	8	Ret	NS	Ret	Ret	10	14	12	9	10	6	5	Ret	6	9	8	87
13	(United Kingdom) George Bowes	10	7	Ret	6	5	Ret	11	12	12	Ret	Ret	DNS		13	13	9	10	11	73
14	(United Kingdom) Scott McPhee	17	Ret	9	Ret	Ret	13	16	13	16	14	11	8	8	8	9	13	8	6	72
15	(United Kingdom) Charlie Huntingford	12	11	12	Ret	6	10	12	Ret			14	14	17	19	20	20	19	18	37
16	(United Kingdom) Alexander Rowan	19	13	13	Ret	10	20	15	14	17	13				12	14	14	12	13	33
17	(United Kingdom) Daniel Goodman	16	9	NS	Ret	8	11	18	20	15	Ret	18	16	15	15	16	18	15	16	24
18	(United Kingdom) Blake Wilson					Ret	17	14	16	13	Ret	13	9	12						19
19	(United Kingdom) Lewis Mullen	15	Ret	Ret	12	12	19	19	18	19	17	17	15	18	14	17	15	16	15	14
20	(Bermuda) Aeziah Divine	21	17	16	Ret	11	18	22	17	22	16	16	12	Ret	16	12	16	18	Ret	13
21	(United Kingdom) Samuel Munson	Ret	15	17	Ret	14	14	17	15	18	15	Ret	19	DNS	18	18	12	Ret	14	13
22	(United Kingdom) Kyle Payne	18	12	20	11	13	16			21	19									12
23	(United Kingdom) Jensen Bishop	20	14	18	10	Ret	Ret	21	Ret	Ret	20	DNS			17	15	19	Ret	Ret	9
24	(United Kingdom) Daniel Stephenson	22	16	15	Ret	15	15	20	19	20	18	15	13	17	20	19	23	20	21	7
	(United Kingdom) Lilly Rhodes	DNQ	DNQ	DNQ	DNQ	Ret	21	24	23	24	23	21	Ret	21	22	23	24	24	22	0
	(United Kingdom) Joshua Williams							23	21	Ret	21	20	17	19	21	21	17	17	19	0
	(United Kingdom) Ben Hardwick	23	18	19	Ret	16	Ret	NS	22	23	22	19	18	20	23	22	21	21	20	0
	(United Kingdom) Charlie Barnes	DNS																		0
	(United Kingdom) Max Rhodes											22	Ret	22			22	23	23	0
	(United Kingdom) Charlie Cunningham																26	22	Ret	0
	(United Kingdom) Lucy Curtis																25	24	24	0
