= 2021 British Talent Cup =

Fourth season of the British Talent Cup

2021 British Talent Cup
Previous:	2020	Next:	2022
Support series: British Superbike Championship; British Supersport Championship; National Superstock; Junior Superstock; Junior Supersport; Ducati TriOptions Cup

The 2021 Honda British Talent Cup was the fourth season of the British Talent Cup. The riders used the Honda NSF250R.

== Calendar and results ==
2021 calendar
Round	Date	Circuit	Pole position	Fastest lap	Race winner	Sources
1	June 26	(England) Oulton Park	(United Kingdom) Carter Brown	(Republic of Ireland) Casey O'Gorman	(Republic of Ireland) Casey O'Gorman	
1	June 27	(England) Oulton Park	(Republic of Ireland) Casey O'Gorman	(United Kingdom) Carter Brown	(Republic of Ireland) Casey O'Gorman	
2	July 10	(Scotland) Knockhill	(United Kingdom) Evan Belford	(United Kingdom) Evan Belford	(United Kingdom) Evan Belford	
2	July 11	(Scotland) Knockhill	(United Kingdom) Evan Belford	(United Kingdom) Evan Belford	(United Kingdom) Evan Belford	
3	July 24	(England) Brands Hatch GP	(United Kingdom) Evan Belford	(United Kingdom) James Cook	(United Kingdom) Carter Brown	
3	July 25	(England) Brands Hatch GP	(United Kingdom) James Cook	(United Kingdom) Evan Belford	(United Kingdom) Evan Belford	
4	August 1	(England) Thruxton Circuit	(United Kingdom) Jamie Lyons	(United Kingdom) Carter Brown	(United Kingdom) Carter Brown	
5	August 14	(England) Donington Park GP	(United Kingdom) Johnny Garness	(United Kingdom) Carter Brown	(United Kingdom) Johnny Garness	
5	August 15	(England) Donington Park GP	(United Kingdom) Carter Brown	(United Kingdom) Bailey Stuart-Campbell	(Republic of Ireland) Casey O'Gorman	
5	August 15	(England) Donington Park GP	(United Kingdom) Bailey Stuart-Campbell	(United Kingdom) Sullivan Mounsey	(Republic of Ireland) Casey O'Gorman	
6	August 28	(England) Silverstone National	(United Kingdom) Johnny Garness	(United Kingdom) Jamie Lyons	(United Kingdom) Jamie Lyons	
6	August 29	(England) Silverstone National	(United Kingdom) Jamie Lyons	(United Kingdom) Harrison Crosby	(Republic of Ireland) Casey O'Gorman	
7	September 4	(England) Snetterton 300	(United Kingdom) Johnny Garness	(United Kingdom) Johnny Garness	(Republic of Ireland) Casey O'Gorman	
7	September 5	(England) Snetterton 300	(United Kingdom) Johnny Garness	(United Kingdom) Harrison Crosby	(United Kingdom) Johnny Garness	
8	September 11	(England) Silverstone National	(United Kingdom) Johnny Garness	(United Kingdom) Ollie Walker	(United Kingdom) Ollie Walker	
8	September 12	(England) Silverstone National	(United Kingdom) Ollie Walker	(United Kingdom) Evan Belford	(United Kingdom) Carter Brown	
9	October 2	(England) Donington Park GP	(Republic of Ireland) Casey O'Gorman	(United Kingdom) Carter Brown	(Republic of Ireland) Casey O'Gorman	
9	October 3	(England) Donington Park GP	(United Kingdom) Carter Brown	(Republic of Ireland) Casey O'Gorman	(Republic of Ireland) Casey O'Gorman	

== Entry list ==
Team	No.	Rider	Rounds
151's Racing	9	(United Kingdom) Bailey Stuart-Campbell	1-6, 9
Amphibian Scaffolding / SP125 Racing	29	(United Kingdom) Lucas Brown	All
ashcourt racing	44	(United Kingdom) Lucas Hill	1-5, 7-9
B Moore Honda	8	(United Kingdom) Ross Moore	1-6
Banks Racing	15	(United Kingdom) Harrison Crosby	All
C&M Motors Ltd / Tooltec Racing	7	(United Kingdom) Jamie Lyons	All
CT Racing	37	(United Kingdom) Corey Tinker	5-7, 9
City Lifting by RS Racing	57	(United Kingdom) Johnny Garness	All
City Lifting/RS Racing	52	(United Kingdom) Evan Belford	All
Davidson racing	28	(United Kingdom) Alfie Davidson*	None
Dunsley Heat Racing	12	(United Kingdom) Josh Bannister	3-9
EPRacing SP125	14	(United Kingdom) Evann Pendrill	1, 3-5
Ernie Coates Race Support - SP125 Racing	2	(United Kingdom) Rhys Coates	1-8
Ernst Dubbink Eveno Racing	20	(Netherlands) Maik Duin	9
iForce Lloyd & Jones	4	(United Kingdom) Sullivan Mounsey	All
JCRsupersport	33	(United Kingdom) JJ Cunningham	1-2, 5-9
Johnson Racing	5	(United Kingdom) Mason Johnson	1-2, 4-9
Microlise Cresswell Racing	67	(Republic of Ireland) Casey O'Gorman	1, 5-9
Microlise Cresswell Racing	53	(Netherlands) Kiyano Veijer	All
Microlise Cresswell Racing	24	(New Zealand) Cormac Buchanan	1-4, 6-7, 9
Microlise Cresswell Racing	40	(United States) Julian Correa	6-9
Microlise Cresswell Racing	22	(United Kingdom) Anthony Eagle	All
Mlav VisionTrack Academy	79	(United Kingdom) Harley McCabe	2-4, 6-9
MJL Racing	51	(United Kingdom) Holly Harris	All
MJL Racing	96	(United Kingdom) Rossi Banham	All
MJL Racing	64	(United Kingdom) Clayton Edmunds	9
Moto Rapido/Sp125	48	(United Kingdom) Ollie Walker	All
Rocket Racing	23	(United Kingdom) Rhys Stephenson	All
RMB Racing	27	(United Kingdom) Ted Wilkinson	7-9
Stiggymotorsport	21	(United Kingdom) Troy Jeffrey	1-5, 8-9
The UPVC Shop/SP125 Racing	27	(United Kingdom) Calum Beach**	None
Thorneycroft56 Racing	55	(United Kingdom) Harrison Dessoy	1, 6-9
Team Thorneycroft Racing	69	(United States) Eli Banish	3-4, 6
True Heroes Racing	61	(United Kingdom) Harrison Mackay	All
Victoria House Mortimer Racing	65	(United Kingdom) Alexander Rowan	2-9
VSB Motorsport	74	(United Kingdom) Carter Brown	All
Wilson Racing	34	(United Kingdom) James Cook	All
Wilson Racing	41	(United Kingdom) Luca Hopkins	All
Wilson Racing	43	(United Kingdom) Ryan Hitchcock	1-4, 9
WM Racing	66	(United Kingdom) Rossi Dobson	1-7, 9
WM Racing	99	(United Kingdom) Peter Willis	1, 5-9

* Although Alfie Davidson was officialliy named on the 2021 British Talent Cup Entry List, he did not contest the championship season due to an injury suffered during pre-season testing.

**Although Calum Beach was officialliy named on the 2021 British Talent Cup Entry List, he did not contest the championship season. Instead, he transitioned to the British Junior Supersport Championship during the 2021 campaign.

== Championship standings ==
Scoring system
Points are awarded to the top fifteen finishers. A rider has to finish the race to earn points.

Position	1st	2nd	3rd	4th	5th	6th	7th	8th	9th	10th	11th	12th	13th	14th	15th
Points	25	20	16	13	11	10	9	8	7	6	5	4	3	2	1

Pos.	Rider	OUL (United Kingdom)		KNO (Scotland)		BRH (United Kingdom)		THR (United Kingdom)	DON (United Kingdom)			SIL (United Kingdom)		SNE (United Kingdom)		SIL (United Kingdom)		DON (United Kingdom)		Pts
Pos.	Rider	R1	R2	R1	R2	R1	R2	R1	R1	R2	R3	R1	R2	R1	R2	R1	R2	R1	R2	Pts
1	(Republic of Ireland) Casey O'Gorman	1^{F}	1^{P}						2	1	1	2	1	1	2	Ret	4	1^{P}	1^{F}	273
2	(United Kingdom) Carter Brown	3^{P}	2^{F}	Ret	5	1	4	1^{F}	5^{F}	7^{P}	8	3	5	2	4	5	1	4^{F}	2^{P}	267
3	(United Kingdom) Evan Belford	2	3	1^{P F}	1^{P F}	2^{P}	1^{F}	6	6	9	9	9	3	3	3	Ret	8^{F}	13	4	244
4	(United Kingdom) Jamie Lyons	8	7	10	10	8	7	2^{P}	8	4	6	1^{F}	2^{P}	7	9	4	2	3	3	223
5	(United Kingdom) Johnny Garness	4	5	2	2	5	3	Ret	1^{P}	2	3	Ret^{P}	14	Ret^{P F}	1^{P}	Ret^{P}	3	8	5	214
6	(United Kingdom) James Cook	DNS	11	5	4	3^{F}	2^{P}	5	3	3	Ret	Ret	Ret	6	5	Ret	10	7	Ret	144
7	(United Kingdom) Harrison Crosby	7	6	3	Ret	10	11	Ret	10	11	11	Ret	4^{F}	4	6^{F}	3	6	6	8	142
8	(United Kingdom) Ollie Walker	6	Ret	8	6	9	6	4	4	6	5	10	Ret	Ret	8	1^{F}	9^{P}	DNS		138
9	(United Kingdom) Sullivan Mounsey	Ret	8	Ret	Ret	7	9	9	9	12	7^{F}	4	6	Ret	Ret	2	5	11	Ret	110
10	(Netherlands) Kiyano Veijer	DNS	16	9	8	13	12	8	7	8	2	14	11	8	15	8	12	9	11	107
11	(New Zealand) Cormac Buchanan	Ret	5	4	3	6	Ret	3				7	Ret	Ret	7			2	Ret	104
12	(United Kingdom) Bailey Stuart-Campbell	18	10	7	7	12	10	Ret	Ret	5^{F}	4^{P}	5	Ret					Ret	7	78
13	(United Kingdom) Rhys Stephenson	11	15	Ret	Ret	15	14	11	Ret	14	12	8	8	5	Ret	15	7	5	6	78
14	(United Kingdom) Troy Jeffrey	12	9	6	Ret	Ret	17	7	12	10	14					6	Ret	21	22	52
15	(United Kingdom) Ryan Hitchcock	4	Ret	Ret	9	4	5	DNS										22	14	46
16	(United Kingdom) Rossi Banham	Ret	19	11	Ret	11	8	12	11	13	17	11	16	Ret	19	13	16	Ret	9	45
17	(United Kingdom) Corey Tinker								Ret	15	10	6	7	9	10			Ret	12	43
18	(United Kingdom) Harley McCabe			Ret	14	22	18	13				12	10	16	11	7	11	Ret	10	40
19	(United Kingdom) Lucas Brown	14	Ret	Ret	15	16	13	10	18	16	13	13	9	Ret	Ret	11	14	Ret	Ret	32
20	(United Kingdom) Mason Johnson	9	12	15	11			18	13	Ret	15	Ret	20	11	17	20	18	14	Ret	28
21	(United Kingdom) Luca Hopkins	15	14	13	12	17	15	14	16	17	16	Ret	13	Ret	14	14	15	16	13	24
22	(United States) Julian Correa											15	12	13	Ret	12	13	10	17	21
23	(United Kingdom) Harrison Dessoy	DNS										23	22	10	12	10	Ret	Ret	Ret	16
24	(United Kingdom) Rossi Dobson	10	Ret	14	13	14	16	21	14	21	Ret	19	16	18	22			19	20	15
25	(United Kingdom) Josh Bannister					23	25	22	15	20	18	17	18	14	16	9	Ret	24	19	10
26	(United Kingdom) Harrison MacKay	13	13	17	16	24	27	15	Ret	25	19	16	Ret	Ret	18	17	19	15	18	8
27	(United Kingdom) Lucas Hill	19	22	12	Ret	20	21	20	21	24	23			20	24	21	21	Ret	15	5
28	(United Kingdom) Alexander Rowan			Ret	Ret	DNS	28	24	24	27	24	21	15	15	13	16	17	17	24	5
29	(Netherlands) Maik Duin																	12	16	4
30	(United Kingdom) JJ Cunningham	16	18	Ret	DNS				20	22	21	20	17	12	Ret	18	Ret	Ret	Ret	4
	(United Kingdom) Peter Willis	17	17						23	26	20	25	25	21	20	22	20	Ret	21	0
	(United Kingdom) Ross Moore	20	24	19	20	19	20	25	17	19	Ret	22	23							0
	(United Kingdom) Evann Pendrill	Ret	20			18	19	17	19	18	Ret									0
	(United Kingdom) Holly Harris	21	23	16	17	25	26	26	26	29	25	27	26	22	25	25	26	25	26	0
	(United Kingdom) Rhys Coates	Ret	21	Ret	18	Ret	23	16	22	23	22	18	19	17	21	19	25			0
	(United Kingdom) Anthony Eagle	22	25	18	19	Ret	24	23	25	28	26	26	24	19	23	23	23	18	25	0
	(United Kingdom) Ted Wilkinson													Ret	DNS	26	24	DNS		0
	(United Kingdom) Clayton Edmunds																	23	23	0
	(United States) Eli Banish					21	22	19				24	Ret							0
