= 2020 British Talent Cup =

Third season of the British Talent Cup

2020 British Talent Cup
Previous:	2019	Next:	2021
Support series: British Superbike Championship; British Supersport Championship; National Superstock; Junior Superstock; Junior Supersport; Ducati TriOptions Cup

The 2020 Honda British Talent Cup was the third season of the British Talent Cup. The riders used the Honda NSF250R. Originally planned for twenty races across ten weekends, the season was shortened to half its length due to the COVID-19 pandemic.

== Calendar and results ==
2020 Calendar
Round	Date	Circuit	Pole position	Fastest lap	Race winner	Sources
1	August 8	(England) Donington Park GP	(Republic of Ireland) Casey O'Gorman	(Republic of Ireland) Casey O'Gorman	(Republic of Ireland) Casey O'Gorman	
1	August 9	(England) Donington Park GP	(Republic of Ireland) Casey O'Gorman	(United Kingdom) Evan Belford	(United Kingdom) Franco Bourne	
2	August 22	(England) Snetterton 300	(United Kingdom) Eddie O'Shea	(United Kingdom) Franco Bourne	(United Kingdom) Franco Bourne	
2	August 23	(England) Snetterton 300	(United Kingdom) Franco Bourne	(United Kingdom) Charlie Farrer	(Republic of Ireland) Casey O'Gorman	
3	September 5	(England) Silverstone National	(United Kingdom) Charlie Farrer	(United Kingdom) Harvey Claridge	(United Kingdom) Charlie Farrer	
3	September 6	(England) Silverstone National	(United Kingdom) Harvey Claridge	(United Kingdom) Harvey Claridge	(Republic of Ireland) Casey O'Gorman	
4	October 3	(England) Donington Park GP	(Republic of Ireland) Casey O'Gorman	(United Kingdom) Eddie O'Shea	(United Kingdom) Harvey Claridge	
4	October 4	(England) Donington Park GP	(United Kingdom) Eddie O'Shea	(United Kingdom) Charlie Farrer	(United Kingdom) Charlie Farrer	
5	October 17	(England) Brands Hatch GP	(United Kingdom) Harvey Claridge	(United Kingdom) Franco Bourne	(United Kingdom) Franco Bourne	
5	October 18	(England) Brands Hatch GP	(United Kingdom) Franco Bourne	(United Kingdom) Franco Bourne	(United Kingdom) Franco Bourne	

== Entry list ==
Team	No.	Rider	Rounds
151s S-C Racing	99	(United Kingdom) Bailey Stuart-Campbell	1-2, 5
Alexander Rowan Racing	65	(United Kingdom) Alexander Rowan	All
Amphibian Scaffolding / SP125 Racing	29	(United Kingdom) Lucas Brown	4-5
Ashcourt Racing	44	(United Kingdom) Lucas Hill	All
Banks Racing	15	(United Kingdom) Harrison Crosby	All
Calum Beach Racing / SP125 Racing	27	(United Kingdom) Calum Beach	All
City Lifting by RS Racing	52	(United Kingdom) Evan Belford	All
City Lifting / SP125 Racing	16	(United Kingdom) Harvey Claridge	All
D&D Racing	46	(United Kingdom) Elliott Dufton	All
Ernie Coates Race Support	2	(United Kingdom) Rhys Coates	All
Four Anjels Racing	66	(United Kingdom) Annabel Thomas	All
Franco Bourne Racing / SP125 Racing	17	(United Kingdom) Franco Bourne	All
Jamie Lyons Racing	7	(United Kingdom) Jamie Lyons	All
JDF Racing	90	(United Kingdom) Harry Cook	All
Johnson Racing	5	(United Kingdom) Mason Cade Johnson	3-5
HMR / True Heroes Racing	61	(United Kingdom) Harrison MacKay	5
Lloyd & Jones PR Racing	4	(United Kingdom) Sullivan Mounsey	1-2, 4-5
Microlise Cresswell Racing	72	(Republic of Ireland) Casey O'Gorman	All
Microlise Cresswell Racing	75	(United Kingdom) Johnny Garness	2-5
Moto Rapido / SP125 Racing	48	(United Kingdom) Ollie Walker	All
MJL Racing	96	(United Kingdom) Rossi Banham	6
Rossi Dobson	11	(United Kingdom) Rossi Dobson	All
Scott Racing	69	(United Kingdom) Gary Scott	All
Stauff Fluid Power Academy	37	(United Kingdom) Corey Tinker	All
Urban Nomads Racing	50	(United Kingdom) Aditya Behal	1
VHC Racing	14	(United Kingdom) Evann Pendrill	1-4
Victoria House Racing Academy / Mortimer Racing	71	(United Kingdom) Charlie Farrer	All
WAM	8	(United Kingdom) Eddie O'Shea	All
Wilson Racing	43	(United Kingdom) Ryan Hitchcock	All
Wilson Racing	57	(United Kingdom) Josh Hiatt	1-2, 5
Wilson Racing	74	(United Kingdom) James Cook	All

== Championship standings ==
Scoring system
Points are awarded to the top fifteen finishers. A rider has to finish the race to earn points.

Position	1st	2nd	3rd	4th	5th	6th	7th	8th	9th	10th	11th	12th	13th	14th	15th
Points	25	20	16	13	11	10	9	8	7	6	5	4	3	2	1

Pos.	Rider	DON (United Kingdom)		SNE (United Kingdom)		SIL (United Kingdom)		DON (United Kingdom)		BRH (United Kingdom)		Pts
Pos.	Rider	R1	R2	R1	R2	R1	R2	R1	R2	R1	R2	Pts
1	(United Kingdom) Franco Bourne	2	1	1^{F}	Ret^{P}	4	5	5	5	1^{F}	1^{P F}	166
2	(United Kingdom) Charlie Farrer	3	DNS	3	4^{F}	1^{P}	3	3	1^{F}	2	Ret	147
3	(United Kingdom) Eddie O'Shea	5	5	2^{P}	2	3	2	2^{F}	4^{P}	4	Ret	144
4	(United Kingdom) Harvey Claridge	8	2	4	3	2^{F}	16^{P F}	1	Ret	Ret^{P}	2	122
5	(Republic of Ireland) Casey O'Gorman	1^{P F}	Ret^{P}	Ret	1	Ret	1	4^{P}	3	Ret	Ret	104
6	(United Kingdom) Evan Belford	Ret	4^{F}	20	6	5	4	Ret	2	3	3	99
7	(United Kingdom) Corey Tinker	6	DNS	6	8	11	10	7	6	5	4	82
8	(United Kingdom) James Cook	9	10	22	11	6	6	6	8	9	6	73
9	(United Kingdom) Elliott Dufton	10	6	5	5	9	Ret	8	12	11	9	69
10	(United Kingdom) Ryan Hitchcock	12	8	10	9	8	7	10	7	15	10	64
11	(United Kingdom) Harrison Crosby	11	9	7	7	10	8	11	10	12	11	64
12	(United Kingdom) Ollie Walker	13	7	8	10	12	9	Ret	9	13	13	50
13	(United Kingdom) Jamie Lyons	4	DNS	Ret	Ret	14	13	Ret	13	6	5	42
14	(United Kingdom) Bailey Stuart-Campbell	7	3	9	Ret					10	Ret	38
15	(United Kingdom) Johnny Garness			Ret	15	7	11	16	14	14	7	28
16	(United Kingdom) Sullivan Mounsey	14	11	15	16			13	Ret	8	8	27
17	(United Kingdom) Rossi Dobson	16	13	17	14	16	17	Ret	15	7	12	19
18	(United Kingdom) Gary Scott	18	12	16	Ret	17	Ret	9	18	21	20	11
19	(United Kingdom) Annabel Thomas	20	Ret	11	13	15	15	Ret	16	18	15	11
20	(United Kingdom) Evann Pendrill	15	16	12	12	19	Ret	Ret	20			9
21	(United Kingdom) Lucas Hill	17	17	13	21	13	14	Ret	23	Ret	19	8
22	(United Kingdom) Lucas Brown							15	11	17	16	6
23	(United Kingdom) Mason Cade Johnson					Ret	20	12	17	16	14	6
24	(United Kingdom) Alexander Rowan	21	18	19	20	Ret	12	Ret	25	20	21	4
25	(United Kingdom) Harry Cook	22	19	21	Ret	21	18	14	19	23	Ret	2
26	(United Kingdom) Josh Hiatt	19	DNS	14	17					19	18	2
27	(United Kingdom) Rhys Coates	Ret	14	18	19	18	Ret	Ret	21	22	Ret	2
28	(United Kingdom) Calum Beach	Ret	15	Ret	18	20	19	18	24	24	22	1
	(United Kingdom) Aditya Behal	Ret	Ret									0
	(United Kingdom) Harrison MacKay							17	22			0
	(United Kingdom) Rossi Banham									Ret	17	0
