= Sheridan Morais =

South African motorcycle racer (born 1985)

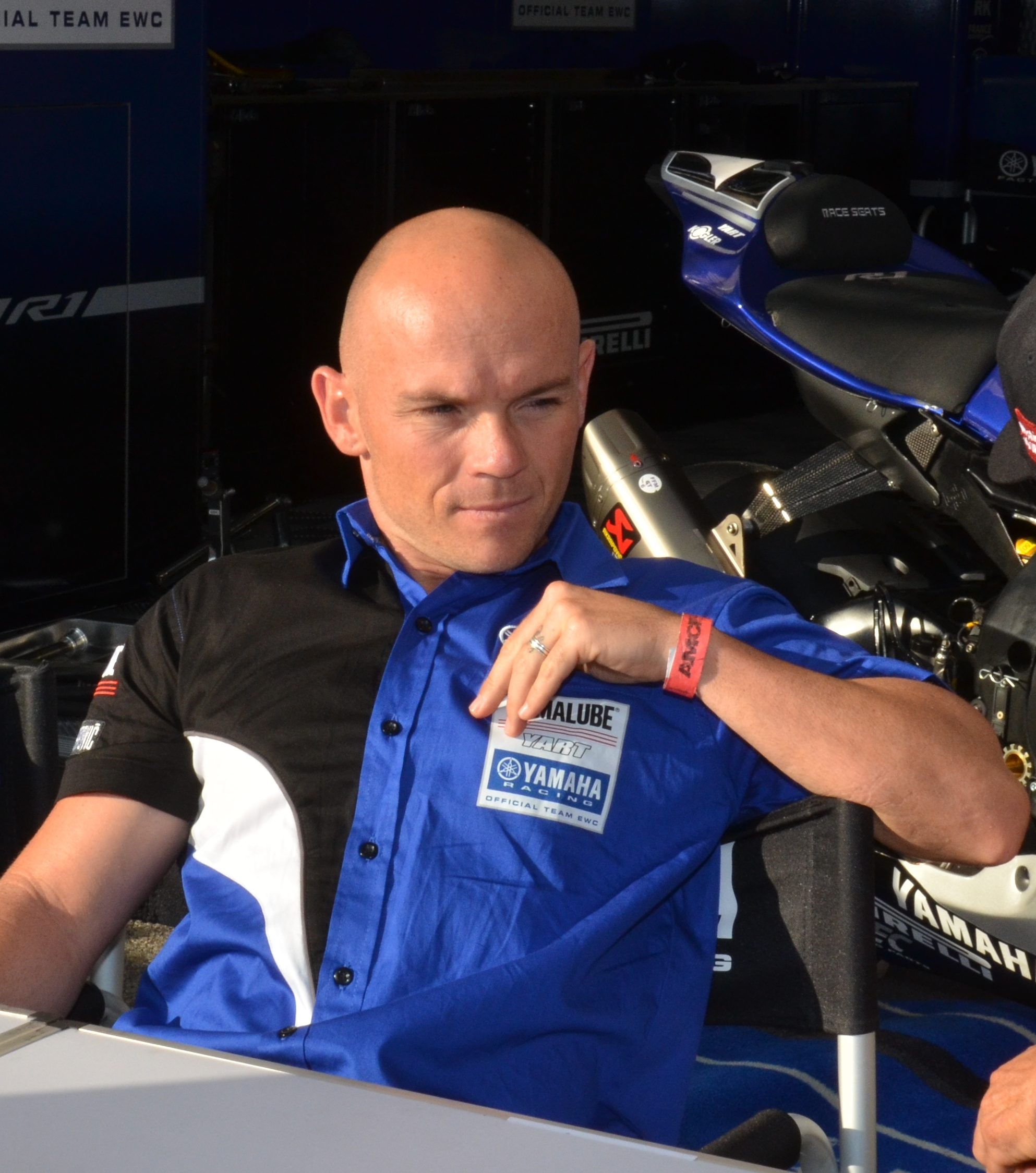
- Morais at the 2016 Bol d'Or
- Nationality: South African, Portuguese
- Born: 11 March 1985 (age 41); Johannesburg, South Africa
- Current team: Webike IKAZUCHI Racing
- Bike number: 32
Motorcycle racing career statistics
Moto2 World Championship
Active years	2018
Manufacturers	Kalex
Championships	0
2018 championship position	43rd (0 pts)
Starts / Wins / Podiums / Poles / F. laps / Points; 3 / 0 / 0 / 0 / 0 / 0
Superbike World Championship
Active years	2009–2010, 2014, 2016, 2020
Manufacturers	Kawasaki, Honda, Aprilia
Championships	0
2016 championship position	NC (0 pts)
Starts / Wins / Podiums / Poles / F. laps / Points; 30 / 0 / 0 / 0 / 0 / 35
Supersport World Championship
Active years	2009, 2012–2013, 2017–2018
Manufacturers	Yamaha, Kawasaki, Honda
Championships	0
2018 championship position	19th (16 pts)
Starts / Wins / Podiums / Poles / F. laps / Points; 42 / 1 / 3 / 1 / 1 / 318

Sheridan Morais (born 11 March 1985) is a South African motorcycle racer. He has competed in the Superbike World Championship, the Supersport World Championship, the FIM Superstock 1000 Cup and the Endurance FIM World Championship. He competed in the Asia Road Race SS600 Championship, aboard a Yamaha YZF-R6 and completed his first ever road race as a wildcard for the German Penz13.com team in Frohburg in September 2019, as the team was sitting out of the first round of the FIM Endurance World Championship 2019/2020 season. In the previous season, Morais and the Penz13.com team finished fifth in the EWC without even competing in the final race in Suzuka.

Morais finished third in the 2022 Macau Grand Prix road race event, revived after the 2020 and 2021 events were cancelled due to COVID-19 restrictions.

== Career statistics ==
- 2006 - 14th, FIM Superstock 1000 Cup, Suzuki GSX-R1000
- 2007 - 13th, FIM Superstock 1000 Cup, Ducati 1098 S
- 2008 - 17th, FIM Superstock 1000 Cup, Kawasaki ZX-10R
- 2011 - 10th, FIM Superstock 1000 Cup, Kawasaki ZX-10R

=== FIM Superstock 1000 Cup ===
==== Races by year ====
(key) (Races in bold indicate pole position) (Races in italics indicate fastest lap)

Year	Bike	1	2	3	4	5	6	7	8	9	10	11	Pos	Pts
2006	Suzuki	VAL; 7	MNZ; Ret	SIL; 7	SMR; Ret	BRN; 13	BRA; 8	NED; 11	LAU; 16	IMO; 16	MAG; 11		4th	39
2007	Ducati	DON; 9	VAL; 13	NED; 25	MNZ; 7	SIL; DNS	SMR; 6	BRN; Ret	BRA; 12	LAU; 12	ITA; Ret	MAG; Ret	13th	37
2008	Kawasaki	VAL	NED	MNZ	NŰR	SMR	BRN	BRA; 2	DON; Ret	MAG	ALG; 15		17th	21
2011	Kawasaki	NED; 11	MNZ; DNS	SMR; 13	ARA; Ret	BRN; 8	SIL; 8	NŰR; 8	IMO; 7	MAG; 8	ALG; 3		10th	65

=== British Superbike Championship ===
==== By year ====
Year	Bike	1			2			3			4			5			6			7			8			9			10			11			12			Pos	Pts
Year	Bike	R1	R2	R3	R1	R2	R3	R1	R2	R3	R1	R2	R3	R1	R2	R3	R1	R2	R3	R1	R2	R3	R1	R2	R3	R1	R2	R3	R1	R2	R3	R1	R2	R3	R1	R2	R3	Pos	Pts
2009	Kawasaki	BHI	BHI		OUL	OUL		DON	DON		THR	THR		SNE	SNE		KNO	KNO		MAL	MAL		BHGP; Ret	BHGP; 10	BHGP; 8	CAD	CAD		CRO	CRO		SIL	SIL		OUL	OUL	OUL	**28th**	**14**

=== Superbike World Championship ===
==== Races by year ====
(key) (Races in bold indicate pole position) (Races in italics indicate fastest lap)

Year	Bike	1		2		3		4		5		6		7		8		9		10		11		12		13		14		Pos	Pts
Year	Bike	R1	R2	R1	R2	R1	R2	R1	R2	R1	R2	R1	R2	R1	R2	R1	R2	R1	R2	R1	R2	R1	R2	R1	R2	R1	R2	R1	R2	Pos	Pts
2009	Kawasaki	AUS	AUS	QAT	QAT	SPA	SPA	NED	NED	ITA	ITA	RSA; 13	RSA; 11	USA	USA	SMR	SMR	GBR	GBR	CZE	CZE	GER	GER	ITA	ITA	FRA; Ret	FRA; 19	POR	POR	32nd	8
2010	Honda	AUS	AUS	POR; 17	POR; Ret	SPA; DNS	SPA; DNS	NED	NED	ITA	ITA																			26th	3
2010	Aprilia											RSA; 13	RSA; Ret	USA	USA	SMR	SMR	CZE	CZE	GBR	GBR	GER	GER	ITA	ITA	FRA	FRA			26th	3
2014	Kawasaki	AUS; 15	AUS; 14	SPA; 15	SPA; 13	NED; 16	NED; 13	ITA; 17	ITA; Ret	GBR; 19	GBR; 16	MAL; Ret	MAL; 17	ITA; Ret	ITA; Ret	POR; Ret	POR; 12	USA; 20	USA; 13	SPA; 13	SPA; 12	FRA; 17	FRA; Ret	QAT; DNS	QAT; DNS					18th	24
2016	Kawasaki	AUS	AUS	THA	THA	SPA	SPA	NED	NED	ITA	ITA	MAL	MAL	GBR; DNS	GBR; DNS	ITA	ITA	USA	USA	GER	GER	FRA	FRA	SPA	SPA	QAT	QAT			NC	0

Year	Bike	1			2			3			4			5			6			7			8			Pos	Pts
Year	Bike	R1	SR	R2	R1	SR	R2	R1	SR	R2	R1	SR	R2	R1	SR	R2	R1	SR	R2	R1	SR	R2	R1	SR	R2	Pos	Pts
2020	Kawasaki	AUS	AUS	AUS	SPA	SPA	SPA	POR	POR	POR	SPA	SPA	SPA	SPA	SPA	SPA	SPA	SPA	SPA	FRA	FRA	FRA	POR; 16	POR; 19	POR; 18	NC	0

=== Supersport World Championship ===
==== Races by year ====
(key) (Races in bold indicate pole position) (Races in italics indicate fastest lap)

Year	Bike	1	2	3	4	5	6	7	8	9	10	11	12	13	14	Pos	Pts
2009	Yamaha	AUS	QAT	SPA	NED	ITA	RSA	USA	SMR	GBR	CZE; 6	GER	ITA	FRA	POR	21st	10
2012	Kawasaki	AUS; 6	ITA; 10	NED; 15	ITA; Ret	EUR; 6	SMR; 6	SPA; 3	CZE; 7	GBR; 7	RUS; 4	GER; Ret	POR; 6	FRA; 14		6th	96
2013	Honda	AUS; 24	SPA; Ret	NED; DNS	ITA; 6	GBR; 7	POR; 5	ITA; 10	RUS	GBR; 19						12th	55
2013	Kawasaki										GER; 18	TUR; Ret	FRA; 5	SPA; 8		12th	55
2017	Yamaha	AUS; 11	THA; 7	SPA; 2	NED; 5	ITA; 4	GBR; 6	ITA; 8	**GER**; 1	POR; 4	FRA; 8	SPA; 6	QAT; 7			4th	141
2018	Kawasaki	AUS	THA	SPA; 7	NED; Ret	ITA	GBR; 9	CZE; Ret	ITA; Ret	POR	FRA	ARG	QAT			19th	16

Year	Bike	1	2	3	4	5	6	7	8	9	10	11	12	13	14	15	16	17	18	19	20	21	22	23	24	Pos	Pts
2021	Yamaha	SPA	SPA	POR	POR	ITA	ITA	NED; 10	NED; 14	CZE; 27	CZE; 15	SPA	SPA	FRA	FRA	SPA	SPA	SPA	SPA	POR	POR	ARG; 15	ARG; 13	INA	INA	26th	13

=== Grand Prix motorcycle racing ===
==== By season ====
Season	Class	Motorcycle	Team	Race	Win	Podium	Pole	FLap	Pts	Plcd
2018	Moto2	Kalex	Willi Race Racing Team	3	0	0	0	0	0	43rd
Total				**3**	**0**	**0**	**0**	**0**	**0**	

==== Races by year ====
(key) (Races in bold indicate pole position) (Races in italics indicate fastest lap)

Year	Class	Bike	1	2	3	4	5	6	7	8	9	10	11	12	13	14	15	16	17	18	19	Pos	Pts
2018	Moto2	Kalex	QAT	ARG	AME	SPA	FRA	ITA	CAT	NED	GER	CZE; 24	AUT	GBR	RSM; Ret	ARA; Ret	THA	JPN	AUS	MAL	VAL	43rd	0

=== CIV National Superbike ===
==== Races by year ====
(key) (Races in bold indicate pole position; races in italics indicate fastest lap)

Year	Bike	1		2		3		4		5		6		Pos	Pts
Year	Bike	R1	R2	R1	R2	R1	R2	R1	R2	R1	R2	R1	R2	Pos	Pts
2022	Kawasaki	MIS; 7	MIS; 9	VAL; 13	VAL; 6	MUG; 10	MUG; 11	MIS2	MIS2	MUG2	MUG2	IMO	IMO	15th	40

=== FIM Endurance World Championship ===
Year	Team	Bike	Tyre	Rider	Pts	TC
2013	Yamaha Austria Racing Team	Yamaha YZF-R1	M	(Australia) Broc Parkes (Slovenia) Igor Jerman (South Africa) Sheridan Morais (Australia) Josh Waters (Japan) Katsuyuki Nakasuga (United States) Josh Hayes		5th
2014	Yamaha Austria Racing Team	Yamaha YZF-R1	P	(Australia) Broc Parkes (United Kingdom) Michael Laverty (Slovenia) Igor Jerman (South Africa) Sheridan Morais (Australia) Ricky Olson (Australia) Wayne Maxwell (United Kingdom) Tommy Bridewell		6th
2015	Yamaha Austria Racing Team	Yamaha YZF-R1	P	(Australia) Broc Parkes (Germany) Max Neukirchner (Spain) Iván Silva (South Africa) Sheridan Morais		10th
2016	Yamaha Austria Racing Team	Yamaha YZF-R1	P	(Australia) Broc Parkes (Germany) Max Neukirchner (Spain) Iván Silva (Germany) Marvin Fritz (Japan) Kohta Nozane (Japan) Takuya Fujita (South Africa) Sheridan Morais		6th
2017	Yamaha Austria Racing Team	Yamaha YZF-R1	B	(United States) Josh Hayes (Australia) Broc Parkes (Spain) Iván Silva (Japan) Kohta Nozane (South Africa) Sheridan Morais		3rd
2025	(Germany) Motobox Kremer Racing	Yamaha YZF-R1	D	(Portugal) Sheridan Morais (Germany) Daniel Rubin (Germany) Lennox Lehmann	24*	10th*

=== Suzuka 8 Hours results ===
Year	Team	Riders	Bike	Pos
2025	(Germany) Motobox Kremer Racing	(Portugal) Sheridan Morais (Germany) Daniel Rubin (Netherlands) Twan Smits	Yamaha YZF-R1	23rd
