= Penz13.com =

German motor racing team

(Germany) Penz13 Racing
- 2025 name: Penz13 Racing
- Base: Böhlen, Saxony, Germany
- Principal: Rico Penzkofer
- Rider(s): .32 (Italy) Luca Gottardi
- Motorcycle: BMW M1000RR
- Tyres: Metzeler

Penz13 is a German racing team established in 2009 that competes in international road racing on courses such as the Isle of Man TT, Macau Grand Prix, and the FIM Endurance World Championship. Its teams include the Penz13 Franks Autowelt and Penz13 BMW Motorrad.

== History ==
The team was formed in 2009 with rider Rico Penzkofer, aiming to introduce a BMW model to the competitive racing scene. They participated in the Macau Grand Prix in 2009, where Penzkofer achieved a fifth-place finish on the Guia Circuit in Macau.

In the FIM Endurance World Championship, they competed professionally with additional starts at the Tourist Trophy at the Isle of Man, the International North West 200 and the Macau Grand Prix.

In 2012, they secured the Endurance World Championship title in Stocksport class and fourth overall in the Superbike class in 2015 and 2017.

== International Road Racing ==
In 2015, Penz13 member Michael Rutter won a podium finish in the Macau Grand Prix. In 2016, Penz13 achieved a top five finish at the Isle of Man with Gary Johnson, and another win by Michael Rutter in Frohburg, Germay.

The 2017 season's lineup of riders of Penz13 included Rutter, Dan Kneen, former Moto3 championship rider Danny Webb, and World Superbike rider Alessandro Polita. The 2017 Superstock TT race saw the team's first step onto the podium with Manxman Kneen's Top 5 finish in the SBK race.

In 2018, the team partnered with the Czech Corporation WEPOL and continued in the international road racing scene. Besides appearing in the International events such as the Isle of Man TT and Macau, the team competed in the International Road Racing Championship (IRRC) with a four-rider line up while contracting various wild card riders. The Penz13 squad won multiple awards during this event, with Danny Webb taking the championship crown in the IRRC Superbike Class and French rider Matthieu Lagrive winning multiple awards in the IRRC Sport Class. In addition to this, Czech rider Marek Cerveny placed fourth and British rider Jamie Coward placed sixth. Additionally, Davey Todd, Daley Mathison, Dan Kruger, Derek Sheils and Martin Jessopp took various wildcards in Imatra, Finland, Frohburg, and Macau.

Later that year, Davey Todd won the IRRC Superbike championship with two races left in the calendar.

== FIM Endurance World Championship ==
The team debuted in the FIM Endurance World Championship in the FIM World Cup in 2010, received the runner-up position in 2011, and won in 2012. The Penz13 squad entered the Superbike Class in 2015 and compared in the following year including pole position at the 24 Heures Motos in Le Mans in 2016.

In 2018, after ten years of working with BMW, the team partnered with Yamaha to receive the R1 as their bike for the following season. However, switching manufacturers caused the team lineup to change. Danny Webb remained with the team, while South African Sheridan Morais, French EWC champion Matthieu Lagrive, and lastly Ex-Moto GP rider Michael Laverty were brought in for the new lineup. The 2018 season started with another podium finish in 3rd position finish as well as two 4th place awards. As of 2018, the team took 3rd in the overall FIM EWC championship after three out of five rounds.
