= Michael Laverty =

Northern Irish motorcycle racer (born 1981)

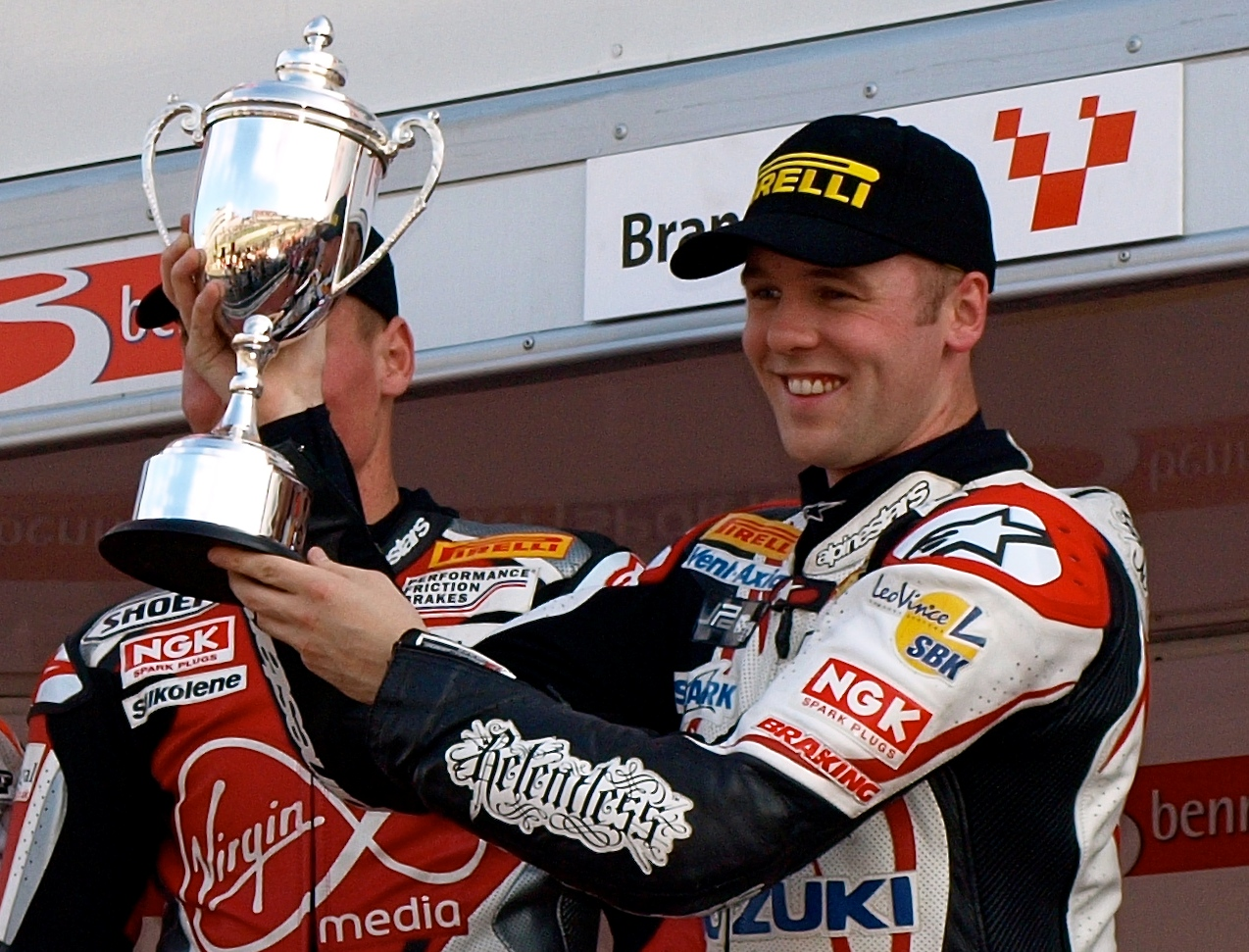
- Laverty, 2007 British Superbike Championship in Brands Hatch
- Nationality: Northern Irish
- Born: 7 June 1981 (age 45); Toome / Toomebridge, County Antrim, Northern Ireland
- Website: mlaverty.com
Motorcycle racing career statistics
MotoGP World Championship
Active years	2013–2015
Manufacturers	PBM, ART, Aprilia
Championships	0
2015 championship position	NC (0 pts)
Starts / Wins / Podiums / Poles / F. laps / Points; 37 / 0 / 0 / 0 / 0 / 12

Michael Laverty (born 7 June 1981) is an occasional motorcycle racer from Toomebridge, Northern Ireland. After participating in the 2017 season in the British Superbike Championship aboard a Yamaha YZF-R1, and the 2018 season on a Tyco BMW, Laverty became a television commentator and occasional rider in Endurance events.

For 2021, Laverty established a young-riders' academy, to act as a competition stepping-stone, based on race-styled minibikes. Laverty also has Moto3 machines available for occasional wildcard race entries.

In September 2021, Laverty announced live on BT Sport, the television provider he is contracted to as a motorcycle race pundit, that he was to establish a new race team for 2022 out of the former Petronas Moto3 team, run by Johan Stigefelt, which would be disbanded at the end of the 2021 season. The team for 2022 with British riders Scott Ogden and Josh Whatley would be known as Vision Track Honda after the title-sponsor, also active in BSB as Vision Track Ducati. Laverty would act as race-team principal, with Taylor Mackenzie as team manager.

Laverty was the 2007 British Supersport Champion, and raced regularly in British Superbikes, plus occasional races in the World Supersport series and in American AMA Superbike Racing. His brother Eugene is a World Superbike rider and brother John was also a racer.

== Career ==
=== British Superbike and Supersport World Championship ===
Laverty raced in Supersport from 2001 to 2004, finishing in the championship top-five in all but his rookie season, and done assorted World Supersport races.

In 2005 and 2006, Laverty raced for the Stobart Honda team in the British Superbike Championship. In 2005, he was tenth overall with podiums at Knockhill and Snetterton, his achievements earning him the title of 'Irish Motorcyclist of the Year' from Irish Racer magazine. In 2006, he was teammate to Michael Rutter. Helped by a pair of fifth places at Knockhill in round 7, he came seventh overall, ahead of the more experienced Rutter.

For 2007, Laverty moved back to the British Supersport Championship, with the successful Relentless Racing by TAS Suzuki team. He beat teammate Ian Lowry to the title, and moved back up to BSB with the team for 2008. He took two fourth places early on in the season and finished ninth overall, but decided to leave the team for 2009.

For 2009, Laverty competed in the USA riding in selected rounds of the AMA Superbike Championship with Celtic Racing. He finished in the top-ten at every round he competed in, with a second position to Mat Mladin at the Road America round being his best result. He also competed in selected World Supersport rounds and joined the CRS team for the latter part of the 2009 season.

In January 2010, Laverty confirmed that he had re-signed with the Relentless Suzuki team to ride in the 2010 British Superbike Championship season.

In May 2010, Laverty took his and the Relentless Suzuki by TAS team's first Superbike victory, in race two of the third round of the 2010 British Superbike Championship at Oulton Park.

In the 2013 and 2014 seasons, Laverty competed in MotoGP on a CRT bike run by Paul Bird and his PBM Team.

The WEPOL Endurance Racing team, run by the German Penz13.com squad with Laverty replacing Matthieu Lagrive placed fourth in races at Le Mans (April 2019) and Slovakiaring (May 2019). They had to abandon their home race in Oschersleben after a technical failure and finished fifth in the overall standing of the 2018-2019 season.

=== MLav Racing ===
Laverty operates a racing team called MLav Racing. They have competed in Moto3 since 2022 while also competing in the British Talent Cup, the 2025 FIM JuniorGP World Championship and have recently made their debut in British Superbikes for the 2025 season with Irish rider Richard Kerr.

== Career statistics ==
=== Superstock European Championship ===
==== Races by year ====
(key) (Races in bold indicate pole position) (Races in italics indicate fastest lap)

Year	Bike	1	2	3	4	5	6	7	8	9	Pos	Pts
2002	Suzuki	VAL	MNZ	SIL	LAU	SMR	BRA; NC	OSC	NED; 1	IMO	19th	25
2003	Suzuki	VAL; 7	MNZ	OSC	SIL	SMR	BRA	NED	IMO	MAG	21st	9

=== British Superbike Championship ===
(key) (Races in bold indicate pole position, races in italics indicate fastest lap)

Year	Bike	1		2		3		4		5		6		7		8		9		10		11		12		13		Pos	Pts
Year	Bike	R1	R2	R1	R2	R1	R2	R1	R2	R1	R2	R1	R2	R1	R2	R1	R2	R1	R2	R1	R2	R1	R2	R1	R2	R1	R2	Pos	Pts
2005	Honda	BHI; 15	BHI; 15	THR; 15	THR; DNS	MAL; 7	MAL; 9	OUL; 13	OUL; 10	MOP; 6	MOP; 4	CRO; 4	CRO; 10	KNO; 3	KNO; 4	SNE; Ret	SNE; 2	SIL	SIL	CAD	CAD	OUL	OUL	DON	DON; 10	BHGP; 11	BHGP; 11	10th	129

Year	Bike	1		2		3			4		5		6			7			8			9			10		11		12			13			Pos	Pts	Ref
Year	Bike	R1	R2	R1	R2	R1	R2	R3	R1	R2	R1	R2	R1	R2	R3	R1	R2	R3	R1	R2	R3	R1	R2	R3	R1	R2	R1	R2	R1	R2	R3	R1	R2	R3	Pos	Pts	Ref
2006	Honda	BHI; 7	BHI; Ret	DON; 4	DON; 7	THR; 10	THR; 11		OUL; 11	OUL; 11	MON; C	MON; C	MAL; 5	MAL; 7		SNE; 5	SNE; 4		KNO; 5	KNO; 5		OUL; 7	OUL; Ret		CRO; 13	CRO; 7	CAD; 12	CAD; 7	SIL; Ret	SIL; 11		BHGP; Ret	BHGP; 5		9th	179	
2008	Suzuki	THR; 10	THR; 5	OUL; 7	OUL; 4	BHGP; Ret	BHGP; 4		DON; 9	DON; Ret	SNE; 6	SNE; 6	MAL; 11	MAL; Ret		OUL; 9	OUL; 7		KNO; 6	KNO; 21		CAD; 8	CAD; 9		CRO; 7	CRO; 10	SIL; Ret	SIL; 15	BHI; Ret	BHI; Ret					9th	141	
2010	Suzuki	BHI; Ret	BHI; 4	THR; 10	THR; 6	OUL; 5	OUL; 1		CAD; 2	CAD; 3	MAL; 3	MAL; 3	KNO; 4	KNO; C		SNE; 6	SNE; 5	SNE; 3	BHGP; 6	BHGP; 4	**BHGP**; Ret	CAD; 4	CAD; 4		CRO; 2	CRO; 1	SIL; 3	SIL; Ret	OUL; 4	OUL; 8	OUL; 4				4th	604^{1}	
2011	Yamaha	BHI; Ret	BHI; 4	OUL; 5	OUL; 5	CRO; 24	CRO; Ret		THR; 1	THR; 7	KNO; 6	KNO; 3	SNE; 4	SNE; 5		OUL; 6	OUL; C		BHGP; 8	BHGP; 4	BHGP; 4	CAD; 1	**CAD**; 2	**CAD**; 3	DON; 2	DON; 14	**SIL**; 2	SIL; 4	BHGP; 1	BHGP; NC	BHGP; 5				4th	601^{1}	
2012	Honda	BHI; Ret	BHI; C	THR; 6	THR; 13	OUL; 6	OUL; 12	OUL; 7	SNE; 2	**SNE**; 1	KNO; 3	KNO; 1	OUL; Ret	OUL; 4	OUL; 5	BHGP; 4	BHGP; 4		CAD; 3	CAD; 3		DON; 3	DON; 2		ASS; 7	ASS; 7	SIL; 3	SIL; 5	BHGP; 10	BHGP; 3	BHGP; Ret				5th	581^{1}	

Year	Make	1		2		3			4		5		6			7		8			9			10		11		12			Pos	Pts
Year	Make	R1	R2	R1	R2	R1	R2	R3	R1	R2	R1	R2	R1	R2	R3	R1	R2	R1	R2	R3	R1	R2	R3	R1	R2	R1	R2	R1	R2	R3	Pos	Pts
2015	BMW	DON; 9	DON; 7	BHI; 13	BHI; 19	OUL; 8	OUL; 4		SNE; Ret	SNE; 4	KNO; 4	KNO; 6	BHGP; 5	BHGP; 5		THR; 9	THR; 6	CAD; 5	CAD; Ret		OUL; 9	OUL; 7	OUL; 12	ASS; 3	ASS; 9	SIL; 6	SIL; 2	BHGP; 9	BHGP; 3	BHGP; 1	4th	601
2016	BMW	SIL; 1	SIL; 6	OUL; 6	**OUL**; 5	BHI; 6	BHI; Ret		KNO; 8	KNO; 21	SNE; Ret	SNE; 3	THR; 2	THR; 1		BHGP; 14	BHGP; Ret	CAD; 10	CAD; 12		OUL; 8	OUL; Ret	OUL; 4	DON; 10	DON; 13	ASS; 6	ASS; 6	BHGP; 11	BHGP; 16	BHGP; 16	8th	202
2017	Yamaha	DON; 8	DON; Ret	BHI; 8	BHI; 11	OUL; Ret	OUL; Ret		KNO; 10	KNO; 8	SNE; 12	SNE; 15	BHGP; 13	BHGP; 9		THR; 21	THR; 13	CAD; 17	CAD; 8		SIL; 17	SIL; 15	SIL; 2	OUL; 6	OUL; 14	ASS; Ret	ASS; 15	BHGP; Ret	BHGP; 8	BHGP; 4	14th	125
2018	BMW	DON; 10	DON; 10	BHI; 8	BHI; 3	OUL; Ret	OUL; 13		SNE; Ret	SNE; 9	KNO; 6	KNO; 5	BHGP; 10	BHGP; 11		THR; Ret	THR; 13	CAD; 14	CAD; 7		SIL; 14	SIL; Ret	SIL; Ret	OUL; 5	OUL; Ret	ASS; 11	ASS; Ret	BHGP; 10	BHGP; Ret	BHGP; Ret	13th	116

Year	Bike	1		2		3			4		5		6		7		8		9			10		11		12			Pos	Pts
Year	Bike	R1	R2	R1	R2	R1	R2	R3	R1	R2	R1	R2	R1	R2	R1	R2	R1	R2	R1	R2	R3	R1	R2	R1	R2	R1	R2	R3	Pos	Pts
2019	BMW	SIL	SIL	OUL	OUL	DON	DON	DON	BRH	BRH	KNO	KNO	SNE; 11	SNE; 9	THR	THR	CAD	CAD	OUL	OUL	OUL	ASS	ASS	DON	DON	BHGP	BHGP	BHGP	24th	12

Notes
1. – Laverty qualified for "The Showdown" part of the BSB season, thus before the 11th round he was awarded 500 points plus the podium credits he had gained throughout the season. Podium credits are given to anyone finishing 1st, 2nd or 3rd, with 3,2 and 1 points awarded respectively.

=== Grand Prix motorcycle racing ===
==== By season ====
Season	Class	Motorcycle	Team	Race	Win	Podium	Pole	FLap	Pts	Plcd
2013	MotoGP	PBM	Paul Bird Motorsport	18	0	0	0	0	3	25th
2013	MotoGP	ART	Paul Bird Motorsport	18	0	0	0	0	3	25th
2014	MotoGP	PBM	Paul Bird Motorsport	18	0	0	0	0	9	24th
2015	MotoGP	Aprilia	Aprilia Racing Team Gresini	1	0	0	0	0	0	NC
Total				**37**	**0**	**0**	**0**	**0**	**12**	

==== By class ====
Class	Seasons	1st GP	1st Pod	1st Win	Race	Win	Podiums	Pole	FLap	Pts	WChmp
MotoGP	2013–2015	2013 Qatar			37	0	0	0	0	12	0
Total	2013–2015				**37**	**0**	**0**	**0**	**0**	**12**	**0**

==== Races by year ====
(key) (Races in bold indicate pole position, races in italics indicate fastest lap)

Year	Class	Bike	1	2	3	4	5	6	7	8	9	10	11	12	13	14	15	16	17	18	Pos	Pts
2013	MotoGP	PBM	QAT; 17	AME; 16	SPA; 13	FRA; 17	ITA; 17	CAT; Ret	NED; 22	GER; 16	USA; Ret	INP; 18	CZE; 18	GBR; 19	RSM; 18						25th	3
2013	MotoGP	ART														ARA; Ret	MAL; Ret	AUS; 18	JPN; 19	VAL; 17	25th	3
2014	MotoGP	PBM	QAT; 16	AME; 16	ARG; 18	SPA; 16	FRA; 16	ITA; 16	CAT; 17	NED; 21	GER; Ret	INP; 14	CZE; Ret	GBR; 17	RSM; 17	ARA; 16	JPN; 18	AUS; 13	MAL; 12	VAL; 19	24th	9
2015	MotoGP	Aprilia	QAT	AME	ARG	SPA	FRA	ITA	CAT	NED	GER; 20	INP	CZE	GBR	RSM	ARA	JPN	AUS	MAL	VAL	NC	0

=== Supersport World Championship ===
==== Races by year ====
(key) (Races in bold indicate pole position, races in italics indicate fastest lap)

Year	Bike	1	2	3	4	5	6	7	8	9	10	11	12	13	14	Pos	Pts
2002	Honda	SPA	AUS	RSA	JPN	ITA	GBR	GER	SMR	GBR	GER	NED	ITA; 15			34th	1
2003	Honda	SPA	AUS	JPN	ITA	GER; 17	GBR; Ret	SMR	GBR; 21	NED; 12	ITA	FRA				30th	4
2009	Honda	AUS	QAT	SPA	NED	ITA	RSA; 11		SMR; Ret	GBR; 20	CZE; 13	GER; 18	ITA; Ret	FRA; Ret	POR; 14	22nd	10
2009	Yamaha							USA; 17								22nd	10

=== MotoAmerica SuperBike Championship ===
Year	Class	Team	1	2		3		4		5		6		7	8		9		10		11		Pos	Pts
Year	Class	Team	R1	R1	R2	R1	R2	R1	R2	R1	R2	R1	R2	R1	R1	R2	R1	R2	R1	R2	R1	R2	Pos	Pts
2009	SuperBike	Suzuki	DAY; 9	FON	FON	RAT	RAT	BAR; 12	BAR; 24	INF	INF	RAM; 2	RAM; 22	LAG	OHI; 10	OHI; 6	HRT; 22	HRT; 7	VIR; 9	VIR; 24	NJE	NJE	15th	98

=== FIM Endurance World Championship ===
==== By team ====
Year	Team	Bike	Rider	TC
2014	Yamaha Austria Racing Team	Yamaha YZF-R1	(Australia) Broc Parkes (United Kingdom) Michael Laverty (Slovenia) Igor Jerman (South Africa) Sheridan Morais (Australia) Ricky Olson (Australia) Wayne Maxwell (United Kingdom) Tommy Bridewell	6th
