= Moto4 British Cup =

Motorcycle racing competition

- Category: Motorcycle sport
- Region: British Isles
- Inaugural season: 2018
- Constructors: Honda
- Tyre suppliers: Pirelli
- Riders' champion: (United Kingdom) Ethan Sparks
- Official website: Official website

The Moto4 British Cup, formerly known as the British Talent Cup, is a motorcycle road racing competition intended for riders between 14 and 17, mainly from the British Isles. The Cup is run by MSVR in collaboration with MotoGP rights holder Dorna Sports, and had its inaugural season in 2018 after being founded the year prior. The championship will run under the R&G Moto4 British Cup moniker from the 2026 season onwards, with sponsorship from R&G.

One rider will be given a chance to race full-time in the FIM JuniorGP World Championship, while two riders will race in the Red Bull MotoGP Rookies Cup. Honda is the series' bike supplier, providing the riders with the Moto3 Honda NSF250R.

In the inaugural 2018 season, Scottish rider Rory Skinner won the cup, 27 points ahead of Englishman Thomas Strudwick. In the second season, Scott Ogden clinched the victory, four points ahead of Cameron Horsman. In the COVID-19-struck 2020 season, Franco Bourne and Casey O'Gorman vied for the title, with Bourne coming out on top. O'Gorman won the 2021 season, winning eight races. He finished ahead of Carter Brown, who missed by six points in the final round at Donington Park.

== Motorcycle specifications ==
The series uses the One Make Bike system so that all racers will use the same motorcycle, namely the Honda NSF250R. All riders use series-specified Pirelli tyres.

Honda NSF250R Technical Data
Dimension	length 1,809 mm x width 560 mm x height 1,307 mm	
Wheelbase	1,219 mm	
Ground clearance	107 mm	
Seat height	729 mm	
Tank capacity	11 liters	
Frame type	Aluminum, twin tube	
Engine type	Liquid cooled 4-stroke engine	
Cylinder arrangement	Single cylinder, inclined 15º from vertical	
Engine displacement	249.3 cc	
Lubricant type	Semi dry sump, forced pressure and wet sump	
Transmission	6 speed	
Clutch type	Wet multi-plate	
Fuel supply system	PGM-FI	
Suspension	Front	Behind
Suspension	Telescopic, inverted type	Swinger, Pro-link
Brake	Front	Behind
Brake	Single disc 296 mm, with 4-piston caliper	Single disc 186 mm, with single piston caliper
Tire size	Front	Behind
Tire size	95/75 R17	115/75 R17

== Winners by season ==
Year	Rider	Pts
2018	(Scotland) Rory Skinner	195
2019	(England) Scott Ogden	177
2020	(England) Franco Bourne	166
2021	(Republic of Ireland) Casey O'Gorman	273
2022	(England) Johnny Garness	336
2023	(England) Evan Belford	303
2024	(England) Lucas Brown	284
2025	(England) Ethan Sparks	327
2026	(England) Ryan Frost	345
