= R&G (motorcycle accessories) =

Motorcycle accessory manufacturer

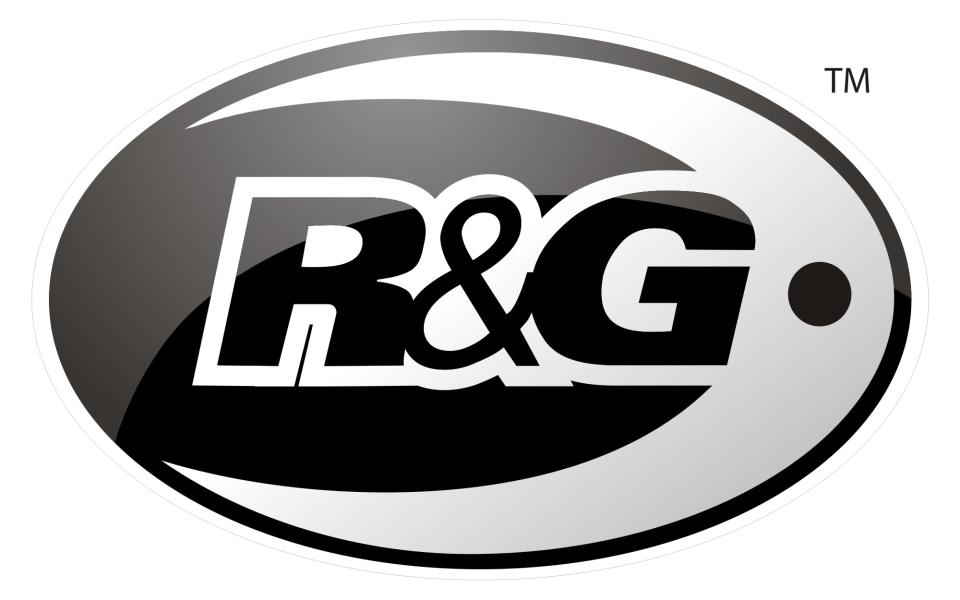
- Industry: Motorcycle Crash Protection
- Founded: 1999
- Founders: Richard Taylor, Gene Marola
- Headquarters: Alton, Hampshire
- Area served: Worldwide
- Number of employees: 39
- Website: http://www.rg-racing.com/

R&G is a British company active in the design, marketing and distribution of motorcycle accessories and crash protection products. Previously known as R&G Racing, it was formed in 1999 and is located near Alton, Hampshire, England.

R&G is an official sponsor of the British Superbike Championship and MotoAmerica and its products have been used in various British Championship and American Motorcyclist Association sanctioned events. R&G products have also been used in supermoto and enduro racing.

== History ==
R&G stands for Richard & Gene, but only Richard Taylor remains with the company, as its chairman. Formed in the 1990s as a precision engineering company, R&G made components for the aerospace industry and Formula One before moving into producing motorcycle crash protection in 1999, forming R&G Racing.

R&G now solely focuses on the design, manufacture and distribution of motorcycle accessories and is currently led by managing director, Simon Hughes, who was promoted in 2013, having previously been Parts & Accessories Marketing Manager at Yamaha Motor Europe. Rebranding as ‘R&G’ in 2014, the company is a member of the Motorcycle Industry Association (MCIA).

The company is based in a 20,000 sq. ft. main premises in Hampshire, England, which includes warehousing, offices, product development and design and a photography studio. R&G is represented globally in more than 50 countries through a network of importers and distributors.

R&G won the Motorcycle Trader Magazine “Accessory Brand of the Year” award (2015) and was runner-up in the British Dealer News Industry Awards “Motorcycle Product Brand of the Year” category (2014, 2016, 2018).

== Racing ==
Motorcycle racing is a key area of development and promotion for R&G. In 2009, R&G was title sponsor to the ACU R&G Suzuki GSX-R Trophy and co-title sponsor of the TriStar R&G Triple Challenge in 2014. In 2015, and again in 2016, it partnered with KTM to provide Engine Case Covers and Toe Chain Guards to all riders competing in the Santander Consumer Finance KTM British Junior Cup. in 2017, R&G became a partner for the Ducati TriOptions Cup series, launching the R&G Ducati Shield in 2021.

In 2013 R&G's Engine Case Covers were approved by the American Motorcycling Association (AMA) for use in any competition sanctioned by the Organisation. In 2014 MotorSport Vision Racing (MSVR) approved R&G's Engine Case Covers for use in any class competing within the British Superbike championship, and in 2015 it became the ‘Official Crash Protection Supplier’ to the British Superbike Championship which it continues to be today. In 2017, MotoAmerica approved the R&G Engine Case Covers for use in the series, before R&G became a series sponsor in 2019.

In 2020, R&G became an official partner of the Honda British Talent Cup, supplying each rider with a set of Engine Case Covers. They became the title sponsor of the series in 2023. 2023 also saw R&G sponsor the new BMW F 900 R Cup

== Products ==
The first product created was for Suzuki's GSX-R750, when R&G developed a round-shaped protector constructed from high-density Polyethylene (HDPE). It was designed to wear and not shatter in the event of a crash. This initial protector used a thin metal sleeve inside, meaning strength was increased while also allowing the fitter to torque the protector. The bung also used a particular grade of steel bolt that helped absorb an impact by bending, rather than snapping or twisting its mounting point on the bike.

== Partnerships ==
R&G has a long history with the California Superbike School, both in the US and UK, and previously in the Middle East. The School has helped in the testing and development of several of R&G's current products and also relies on R&G to protect its fleets of School and instructor bikes.

Ducati UK has used R&G products to protect its fleet of demonstrator bikes, whilst the Chris Walker Superbike School used R&G products to protect its fleet of 35 Kawasaki ZX-6Rs in 2012 and 2013.

Stunt rider Kevin Carmichael has used R&G products, as has Dave Coates and Teach McNeil

For the 2016 race season R&G began working with No Limits Racing. Also in 2016, R&G was appointed the official Crash Protection Supplier to Silverstone Track Days.
