= Thruxton Circuit =

Motorsport race track in England

- Main Circuit (1968–present)
- Location: Hampshire, England
- Coordinates: 51°12′37″N 1°36′2″W
- FIA Grade: 4
- Owner: Thruxton Circuit Ltd
- Opened: 1950
- Major events: Current: BTCC (1979–present); BSB (1990, 1996–2019, 2021–present); Former: FIM Endurance World Championship; Thruxton 500 (1960–1964, 1969–1977); TCR UK (2024); British F3 (1977–2008, 2010, 2014); British GT (1994–1996, 2000–2005, 2007–2008); BOSS Formula (1996, 1998–2000); Formula 3000 (1985); Formula Two (1968–1984); Formula 5000 (1970–1971, 1974–1975)
- Website: https://thruxtonracing.co.uk/

Main Circuit (1968–present)
- Length: 3.793 km (2.357 mi)
- Turns: 12
- Race lap record: 1:01.960 ( (United Kingdom) Earl Goddard, Reynard 95D, 2000, F3000)

Main Circuit (1952–1964)
- Length: 4.437 km (2.757 mi)
- Turns: 8
- Race lap record: 2:00.000 ( (United Kingdom) Tony Rolt, Connaught Type A, 1953, F2)

Original Circuit (1950–1952)
- Length: 3.042 km (1.890 mi)
- Turns: 6

The Thruxton Circuit is a 2.356 mi (3.792 km) motor-racing circuit located near the village of Thruxton in Hampshire, England, United Kingdom, about 30 mi (48 km) north of Southampton.

It has hosted motorsport events including the British Touring Car Championship, British GT Championship, British Formula One Championship, British Formula Three, and GB3 Championship. It is often referred to as the "Fastest Circuit in the UK" where drivers can reach speeds of over 190 mph (300 km/h). To illustrate this, Damon Hill drove his Williams Formula One car around the circuit at an average speed of 147 mph (237 km/h) in 1993.

The site also houses the headquarters of the British Automobile Racing Club (BARC).

== History ==
=== Background (1942–1967) ===
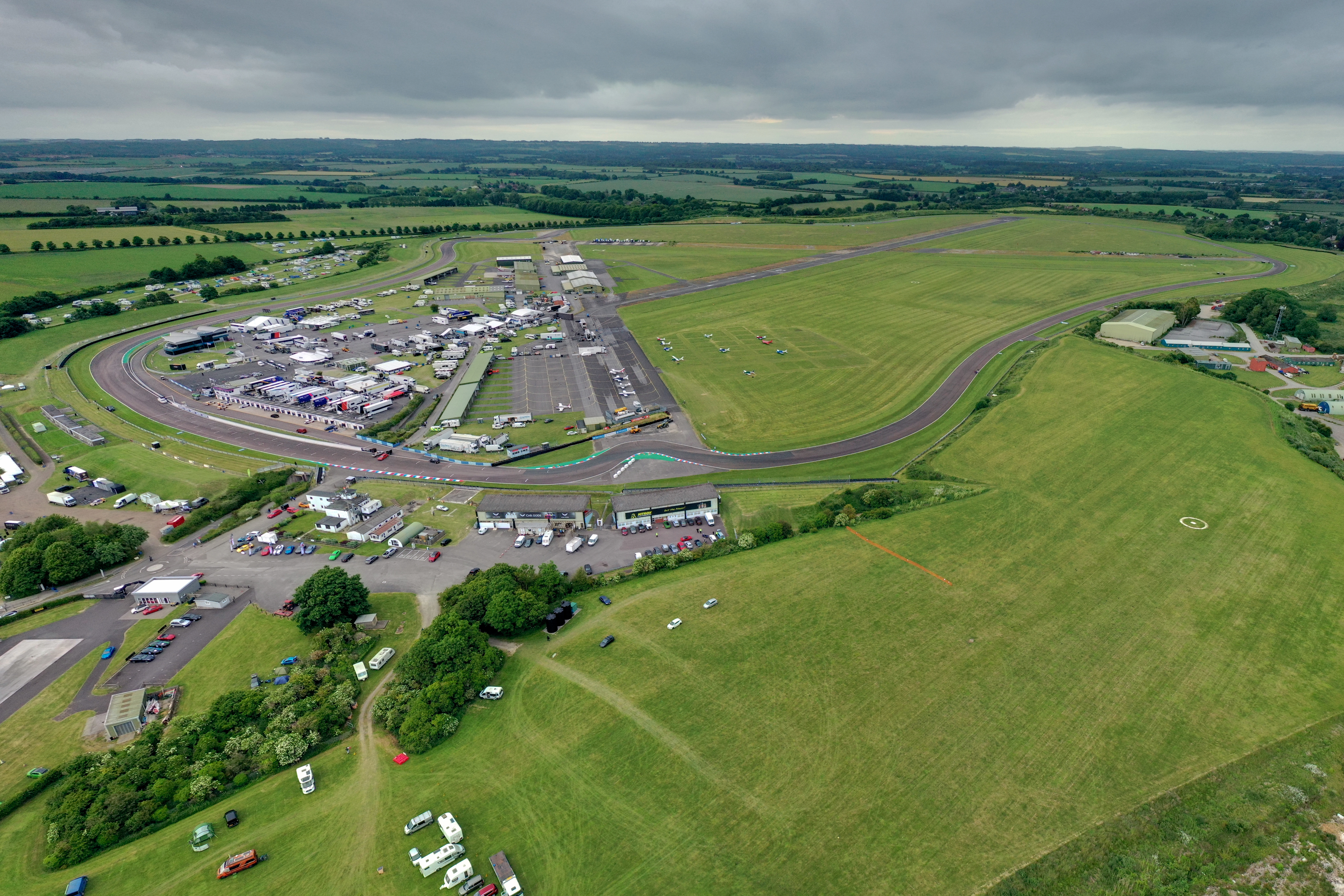
Thruxton Circuit in 2024

The site was originally constructed in 1942 as RAF Thruxton, a World War II airfield which was home to both the RAF and USAAF and was used for troop-carrying aircraft and gliders, including operations during the D-Day landings. Also, the paratroopers who took part in the successful Bruneval Raid (Operation Biting), in which German radar equipment was seized on the coast of France, took off from here.

=== Establishment (1968–1999) ===
The circuit, which follows the line of the airfield's perimeter road, was established in 1968. From 1950 to 1965, motorbike races had taken place on the runways and perimeter road.

=== Modern developments (2000–present) ===
Thruxton Circuit was resurfaced in 2000, resulting in lap times dropping considerably compared to the previous year. In 2020, further safety developments were completed at Church, one of the fastest sections of the Thruxton Circuit. A new spectator viewing area has been constructed around Noble, extending through towards Goodwood. In 2025, Thruxton introduced a new spectator area known as the Woodham Hill Bank, located on the approach to the Club chicane.

== Motorsport activities ==
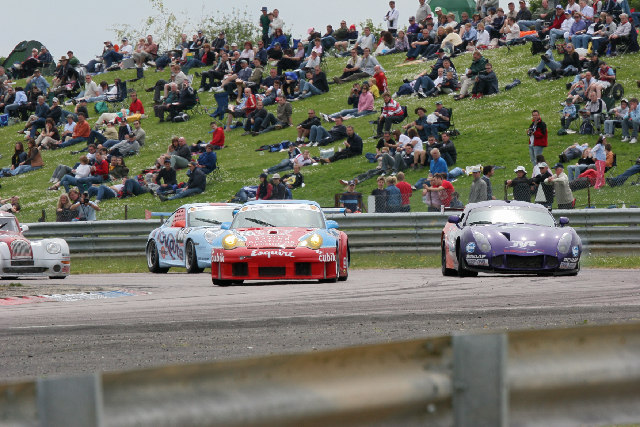
Racing at Thruxton

Owing to planning restrictions, the circuit can only run 12 days of motorsport each year. Currently, three are devoted to motorbike racing, with a weekend dedicated to the British Superbike Championship, Britain's premier motorcycle racing category; with the third day being used for club racing.

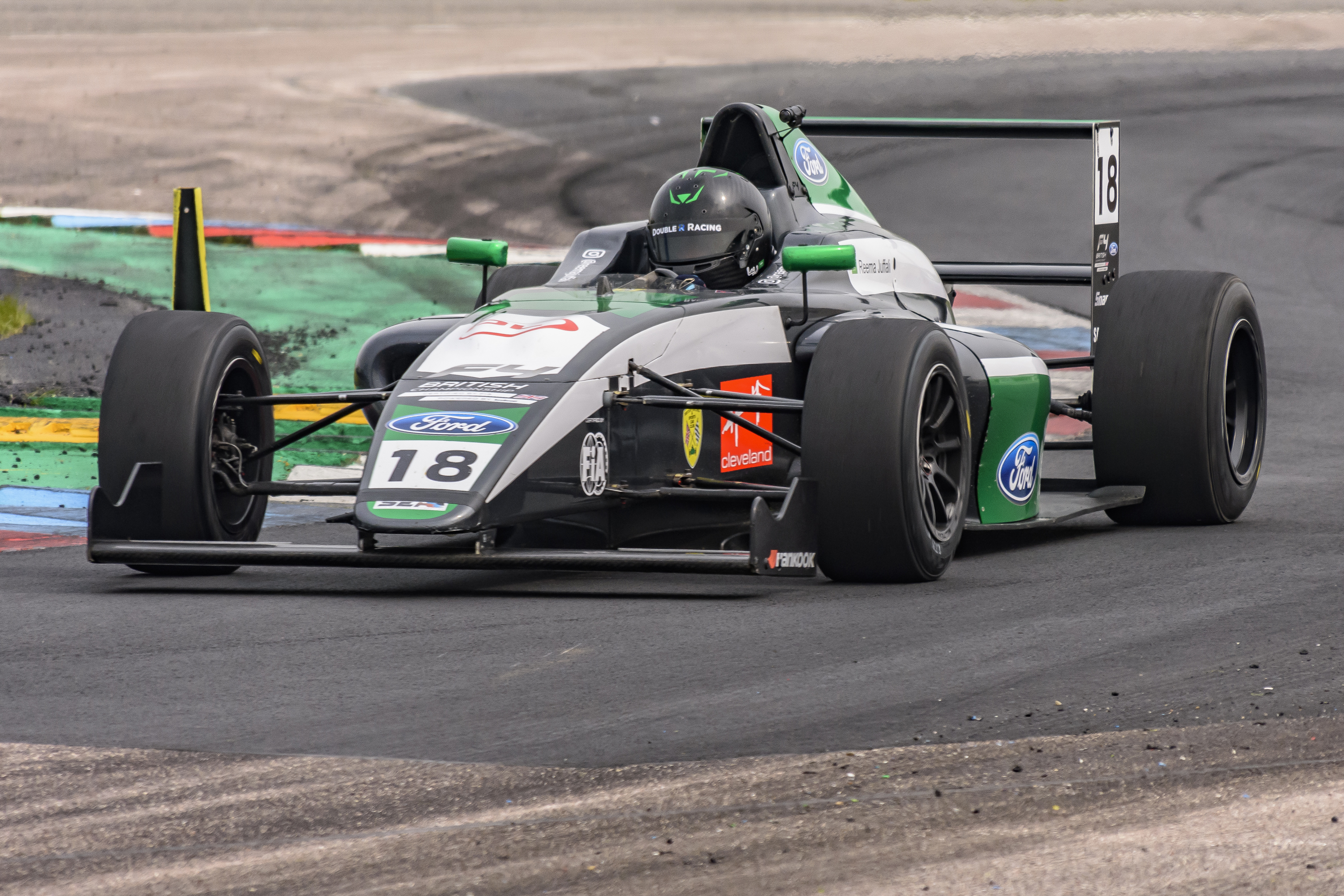
Reema Juffali in her F4 car at Thruxton in April 2019

The remaining days are devoted to car and truck racing with weekends being used for the TOCA British Touring Car Championship, the British Truck Racing Championship, the Thruxton Retro and the remaining days are allocated to other organising clubs, such as the 750 Motor Club or the Classic Sportscar Club. Owing to the relative infrequency of race meetings, Thruxton continues to be a popular part of the motorsport calendar.

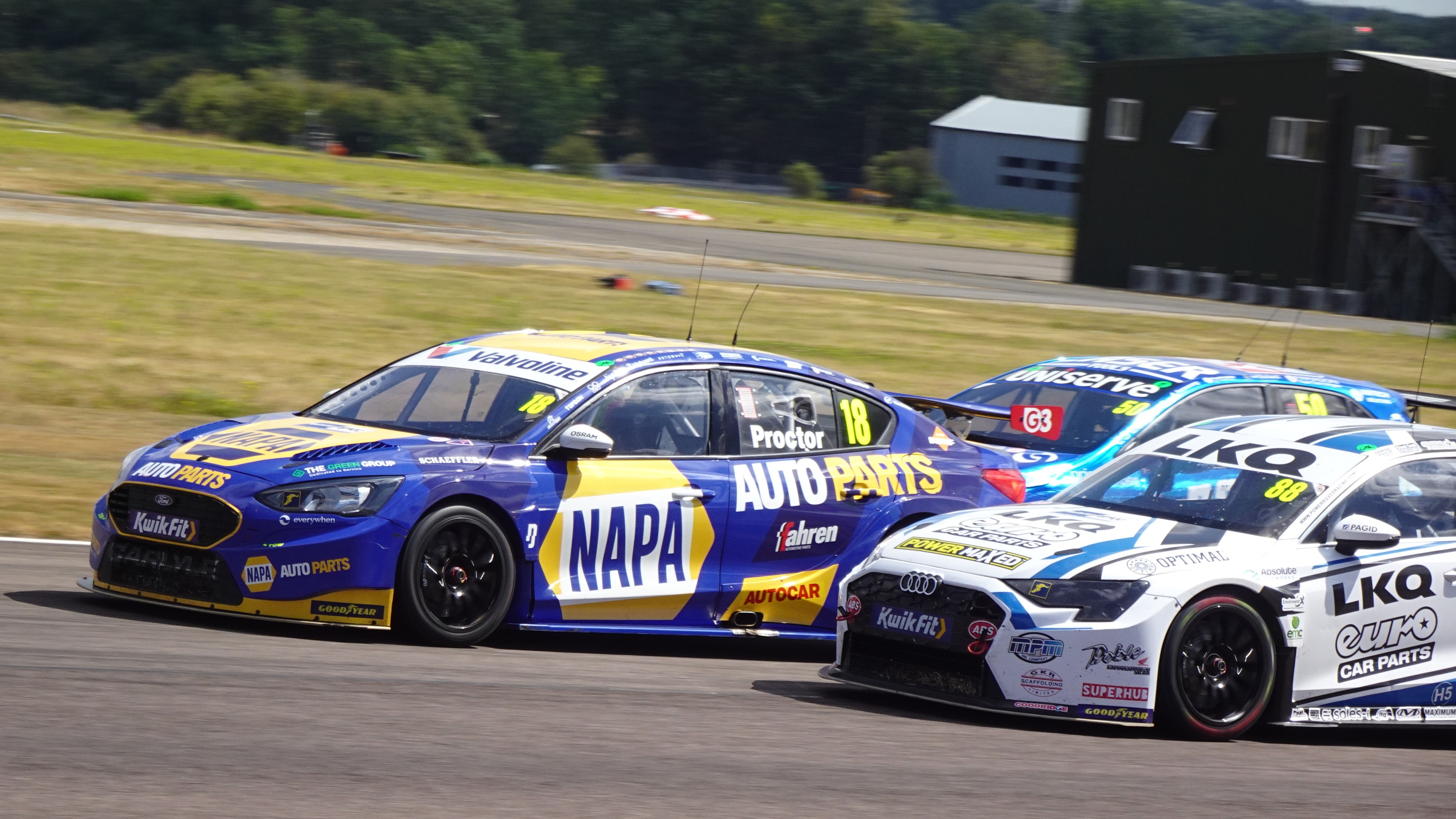
BTCC racing at Thruxton in 2026

== Events ==
Current

- May: British Truck Racing Championship
- July: British Touring Car Championship, F4 British Championship, Porsche Carrera Cup Great Britain, Thruxton Retro
- August: British Superbike Championship, Moto4 British Cup, BMW F900R Cup

Former

- BOSS GP (1996, 1998–2000)
- British Formula 3 International Series (1977–2008, 2010, 2014)
- British GT Championship (1994–1996, 2000–2005, 2007–2008)
- European Formula 5000 Championship (1970–1971, 1974–1975)
- European Formula Two Championship (1968–1984)
- FIM Endurance World Championship
  - Thruxton 500 (1960–1964, 1969–1977)
- International Formula 3000 (1985)
- TCR UK Touring Car Championship (2024)

== Lap records ==
The all-time outright unofficial track record is 0:57.6 seconds, set by Damon Hill in a Williams FW15C, during a demonstration run in 1993. As of August 2026, the fastest official race lap records at the Thruxton Circuit are listed as:

Category	Time	Driver	Vehicle	Event
Main Circuit (1968–present): 3.793 km (2.357 mi)
Formula 3000	1:01.960	Earl Goddard	Reynard 95D	2000 Thruxton EuroBOSS round
Formula Three	1:06.752	Jean-Éric Vergne	Dallara F308	2010 Thruxton British F3 round
Formula Two	1:07.370	Johnny Cecotto	March 822	1982 Thruxton F2 round
Group C	1:07.460	James Weaver	Porsche 956 GTi	1986 Thruxton Interserie round
Formula One	1:09.430	Emilio de Villota	Lotus 78	1979 2nd Thruxton British F1 round
GT1	1:10.785	David Warnock	Lister Storm GT	2002 Thruxton British GT round
Formula 4	1:10.848	Alex Dunne	Tatuus F4-T421	2022 1st Thruxton British F4 round
Formula 5000	1:11.000	Vern Schuppan (Note: Both drivers took the same lap time independently in different races.); Ian Ashley	Lola T332; Lola T330	1974 2nd Thruxton F5000 round 1975 1st Thruxton F5000 round
Porsche Carrera Cup	1:12.823	Robert de Haan	Porsche 911 (992 I) GT3 Cup	2023 Thruxton Porsche Carrera Cup GB round
Super Touring	1:13.272	Jason Plato	Vauxhall Vectra	2000 Thruxton BTCC round
N-GT	1:13.303	Nathan Kinch	Ferrari 360 Modena GTC	2004 Thruxton British GT round
GT2	1:13.437	Tim Mullen	Ferrari 360 Modena GTC	2005 Thruxton British GT round
Group 6 Prototype	1:14.000	John Burton	Chevron B19	1971 2nd Thruxton RAC BSC round
Superbike	1:14.539	Bradley Ray	Yamaha YZF-R1	2025 Thruxton BSB round
Formula BMW	1:14.709	Stian Sørlie	Mygale FB02	2004 Thruxton Formula BMW UK round
NGTC	1:15.254	Ashley Sutton	Ford Focus ST	2025 Thruxton BTCC round
Group 7 Racing Car	1:16.200	Jo Siffert	Porsche 917	1971 1st Thruxton RAC BSC round
Supersport	1:16.384	Jack Kennedy	Honda CBR600RR	2024 Thruxton BSS round
BTC Touring	1:17.303	Yvan Muller	BTC-T Vauxhall Astra Coupe	2002 Thruxton BTCC round
Group 4 Sports Car	1:17.400	Brian Redman	Lola T70 Mk.3B GT	1969 Embassy Trophy
Sports 2000	1:17.880	Ray Bellm	Chevron B36	1984 Thruxton Thundersports round
Sportbike	1:19.768	Ash Barnes	Suzuki GSX-8R	2025 Thruxton British Sportbike round
TCR Touring Car	1:20.485	Fynn Jones	Cupra León TCR	2025 Thruxton Britcar round
Group A	1:20.640	Dave Brodie	Ford Sierra RS500 Cosworth	1989 1st Thruxton BTCC round
Group 5 Sports Car	1:21.000	Peter Brown	Ferrari 512 M	1972 Thruxton MN GT round
BMW F900R Cup	1:21.051	Nikki Coates	BMW F900R	2025 Thruxton BMW F900R Cup round
Moto3	1:21.145	Marco Holt	Honda NSF250R	2026 Thruxton Moto4 British Cup round
Truck racing	1:34.526	Michael Oliver	MAN TGS	2025 Thruxton BTRC round
Main Circuit (1952–1964): 4.437 km (2.757 mi)
Formula Two	2:00.000	Tony Rolt	Connaught Type A	1953 Bristol MC & LCC Race
Sports car racing	2:05.200	Jimmy Stewart	Jaguar C-type	1953 Thruxton National Sports Car race

== See also ==
- Thruxton 500
