= Cal Crutchlow =

British motorcycle racer (born 1985)

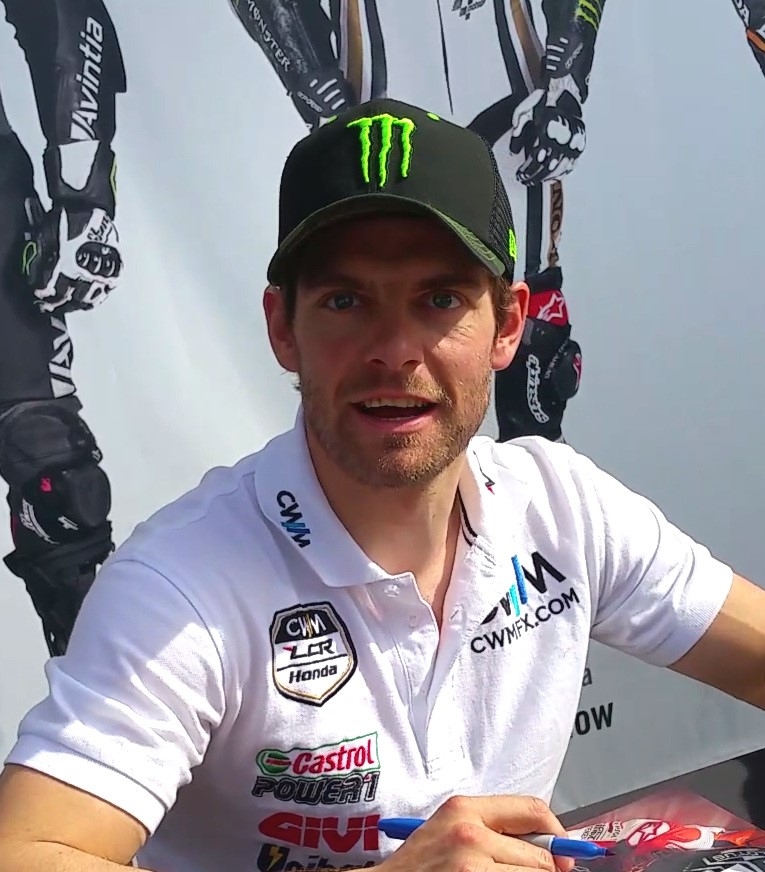
- Crutchlow at the 2015 Grand Prix of the Americas
- Nationality: British
- Born: 29 October 1985 (age 41); Coventry, West Midlands, England
- Current team: Castrol Honda LCR (replacement rider)
- Bike number: 35
Motorcycle racing career statistics
MotoGP World Championship
Active years	2011–2023, 2026
Manufacturers	Yamaha (2011–2013, 2021–2023); Ducati (2014); Honda (2015–2020, 2026)
Championships	0
2023 championship position	29th (3 pts)
Starts / Wins / Podiums / Poles / F. laps / Points; 180 / 3 / 19 / 4 / 4 / 1187
Superbike World Championship
Active years	2008, 2010
Manufacturers	Honda, Yamaha
Championships	0
2010 championship position	5th (284 pts)
Starts / Wins / Podiums / Poles / F. laps / Points; 30 / 3 / 11 / 6 / 8 / 311
Supersport World Championship
Active years	2005–2006, 2009
Manufacturers	Honda, Yamaha
Championships	1 (2009)
2009 championship position	1st (243 pts)
Starts / Wins / Podiums / Poles / F. laps / Points; 17 / 5 / 10 / 10 / 9 / 260

Cal Crutchlow (born 29 October 1985) is an English professional motorcycle racer who retired from regular competition after the 2020 MotoGP season. A three-time MotoGP race winner, he became the first British man since Barry Sheene in 1981 to win a premier class race at the 2016 Czech Republic Grand Prix. Before joining MotoGP, Crutchlow won the Supersport World Championship and won three races in the Superbike World Championship. Following his retirement, he worked as a test rider for Yamaha in MotoGP, and has served as a replacement rider for both Yamaha and LCR Honda.

After winning the 2006 British Supersport Championship, Crutchlow moved into the British Superbike Championship, where he finished third in 2008. In 2009 he won the Supersport World Championship with Yamaha, and then entered the Superbike World Championship, where he finished fifth in 2010. This was an unconventional route to secure his entry into MotoGP, which he joined in 2011 with Monster Yamaha Tech 3. Crutchlow took his first podium finish in MotoGP at the 2012 Czech Republic Grand Prix. His fifth place finish in the 2013 standings earned him a move to the factory Ducati team for 2014. After a disappointing season, he moved again to LCR Honda for 2015. He took his maiden MotoGP victory in Brno, followed by another win in Australia. Crutchlow remained with LCR Honda for the rest of his career, achieving his third premier class win in Argentina in 2018. He retired after the truncated 2020 season, in which he did not take a top five finish. He had scored at least one podium for eight consecutive seasons, from 2012 to 2019.

Crutchlow served as a MotoGP test rider for Yamaha from 2021 to 2025. During 2021, he returned to race for two Yamaha teams as a replacement rider across four weekends. He also replaced Andrea Dovizioso for the last six events of 2022, after Dovizioso's retirement was announced mid-season. In 2023, he took a wildcard into the Japanese GP. In 2026, Crutchlow made a surprise return to the grid as a replacement rider for his old team LCR Honda, due to Johann Zarco's injury.

In early 2017, the RAC awarded Crutchlow the Torrens Trophy, an accolade given in recognition of "outstanding contribution to motorcycling in the United Kingdom".

== Career ==
=== Early career ===
Born in Coventry, England, Crutchlow was named Cal after the American motorcycle racer Cal Rayborn. Although his father Derek was a racer, he did not become interested in the sport himself until the age of 11. As of 2007, he did not hold a motorcycle licence for the road. He had football trials with Coventry City and Aston Villa as a youth, but after a knee injury chose to concentrate on motorcycle racing.

Crutchlow won the UK Junior Challenge in 1999, and the Aprilia RS125 Challenge in 2001. He was runner-up in the 2003 Yamaha R6 Cup behind Tommy Hill, who earned a factory sponsored ride in the British Superbike series for this achievement.

Crutchlow won the British Supersport Championship in 2006, after a three-year stint in the series in which he finished third in 2005.

=== British Superbike Championship ===
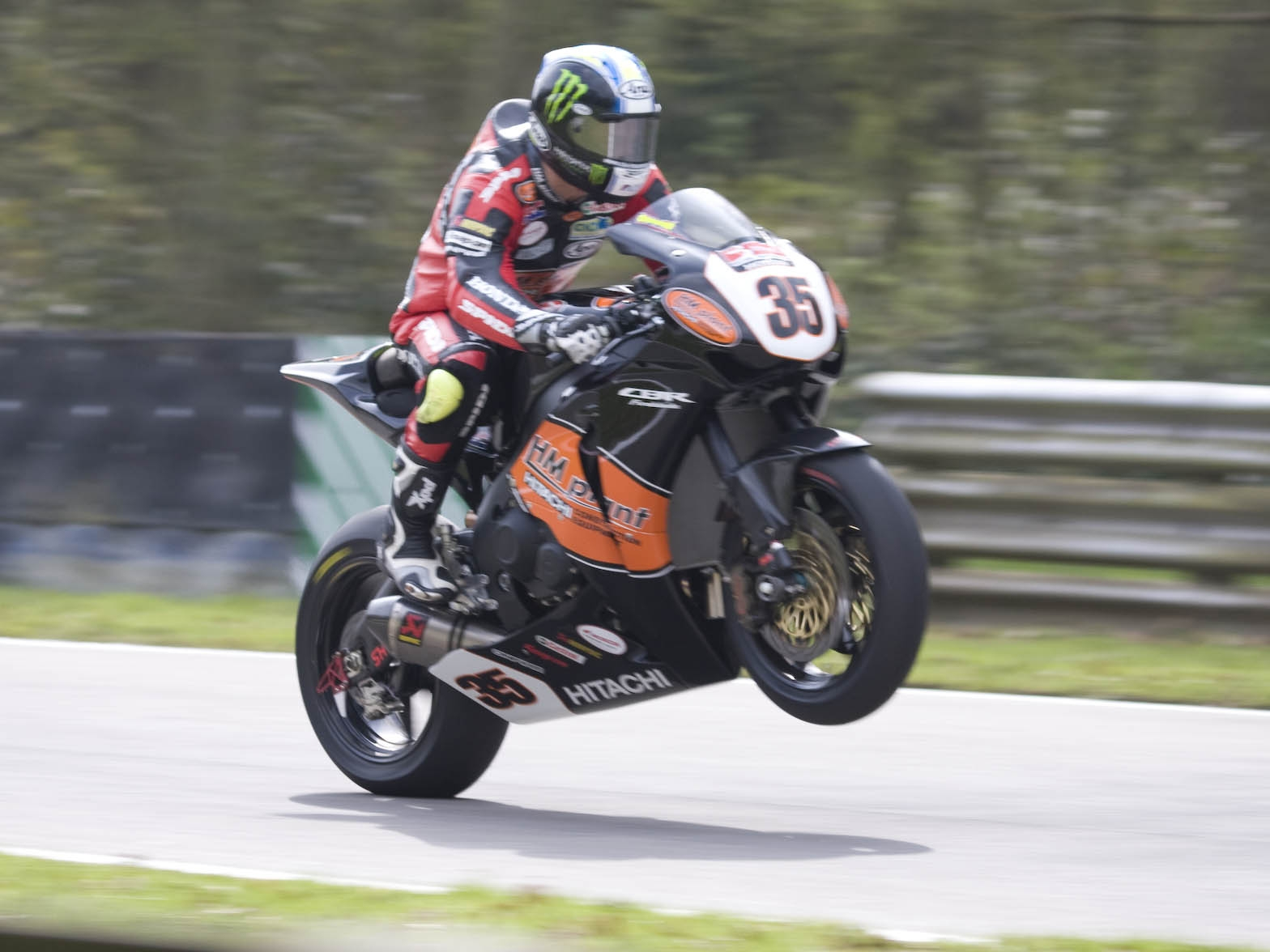
Crutchlow riding for Honda in the 2008 British Superbike Championship

For 2007, Crutchlow made his debut in the prestigious British Superbike Championship, with the Rizla Suzuki team alongside four-time runner-up Chris Walker. He took pole at Croft, and took his first podium with a third place finish at Brands Hatch. He finished ninth overall. For 2008, he moved to HM Plant Honda, sponsored by CIA Insurance. He took his first series win in race 2 at Thruxton. He took pole for round 3 at Oulton Park – he led race 1 before running wide in damp conditions, and crashed heavily out of second place in race 2, injuring his ankle in the process. After initially having the better of teammate Leon Haslam, Crutchlow was ultimately outpointed by him. He took two wins across the season, and finished third in the championship, beating Tom Sykes by two points after the Yorkshireman had a late mechanical failure in the final round. At the end of 2007, Crutchlow also participated and won the Race of the Year at Mallory Park.

=== Supersport World Championship ===
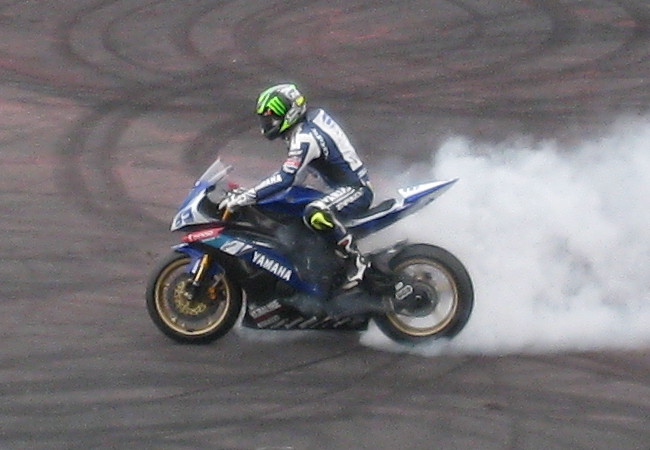
Crutchlow celebrating a victory at the Nurburgring in 2009

On 23 September 2008, it was confirmed that Crutchlow had signed a deal to ride for the Wilco Zeelenberg-managed Yamaha factory team in the 2009 World Supersport Championship. He finished in the top-four at every race until he suffered a mechanical failure while leading at Brno. He soon found himself in a two-way championship dice with surprise package Eugene Laverty on a Parkalgar Honda. Crutchlow led the championship, but a gearbox failure while leading at Imola meant that Laverty surged to just three points behind him in the standings. Laverty crashed after an intense start at Magny-Cours, picking his bike back up to leave him 19 points behind Crutchlow with one race left. Laverty won the race, in Portimão, but Crutchlow's fourth place finish was enough to secure him the 2009 championship.

=== Superbike World Championship ===
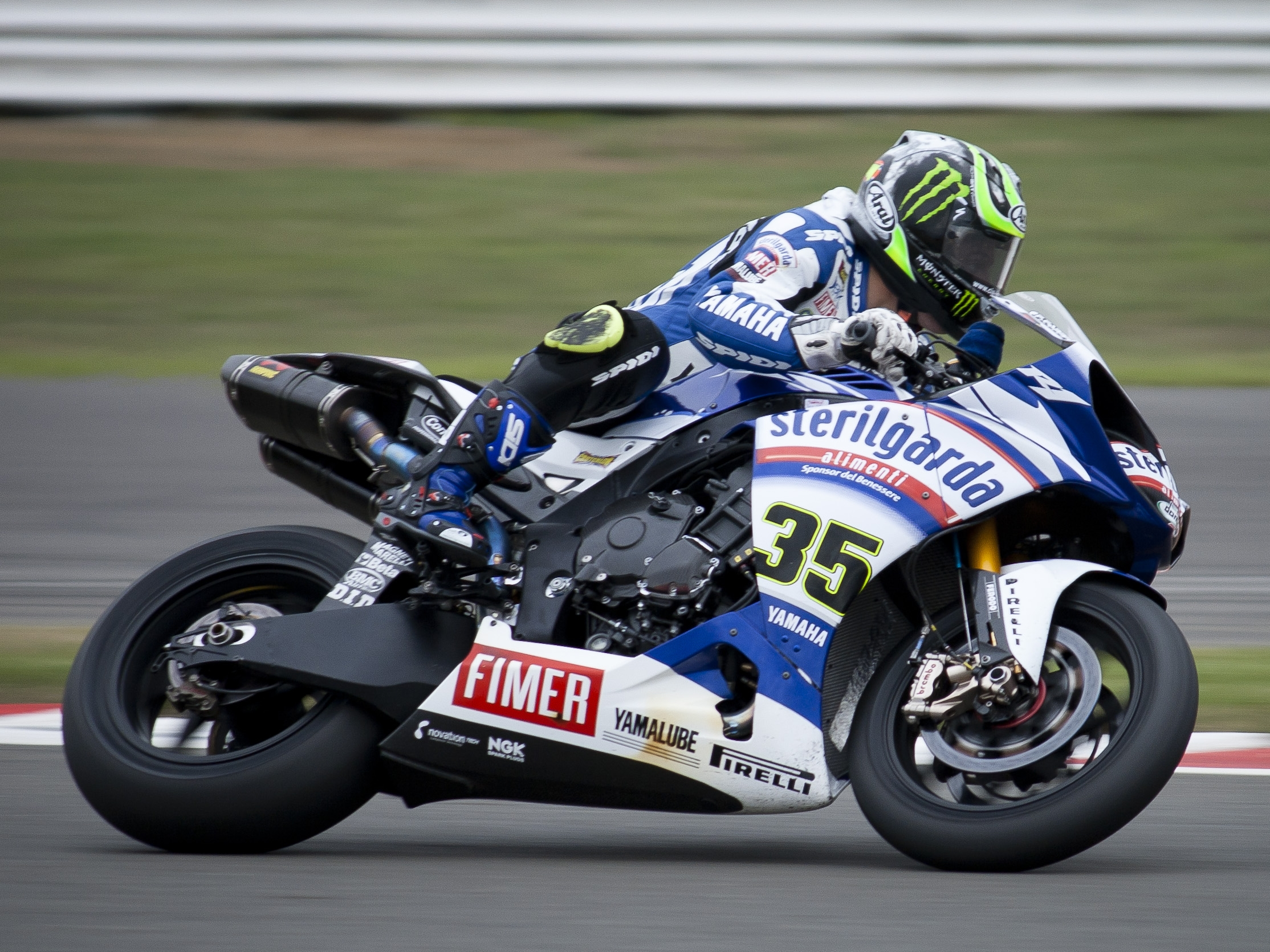
Crutchlow took his first World Superbike race wins at the Silverstone round in 2010

On 1 October 2009, Yamaha announced that Crutchlow would make the move from World Supersport to the Superbike World Championship in 2010. His teammate was former world champion James Toseland, who had rejoined World Superbike after losing his place in MotoGP. Crutchlow took his first series pole at his second meeting, at Portimão, but did not win either race. He stoked controversy after the first race there by mentioning in an interview that he was well clear of Toseland when he crashed out, but insisted that he was not arrogant. Toseland later pointed out that Crutchlow's tendency to speak his mind meant that not everybody could get on with him. Crutchlow took his first two World Superbike wins at Silverstone, after battling with Ten Kate Racing rider Jonathan Rea, and as a result climbed from tenth to fifth in the standings.

=== MotoGP World Championship ===
==== Monster Yamaha Tech 3 (2011–2013) ====
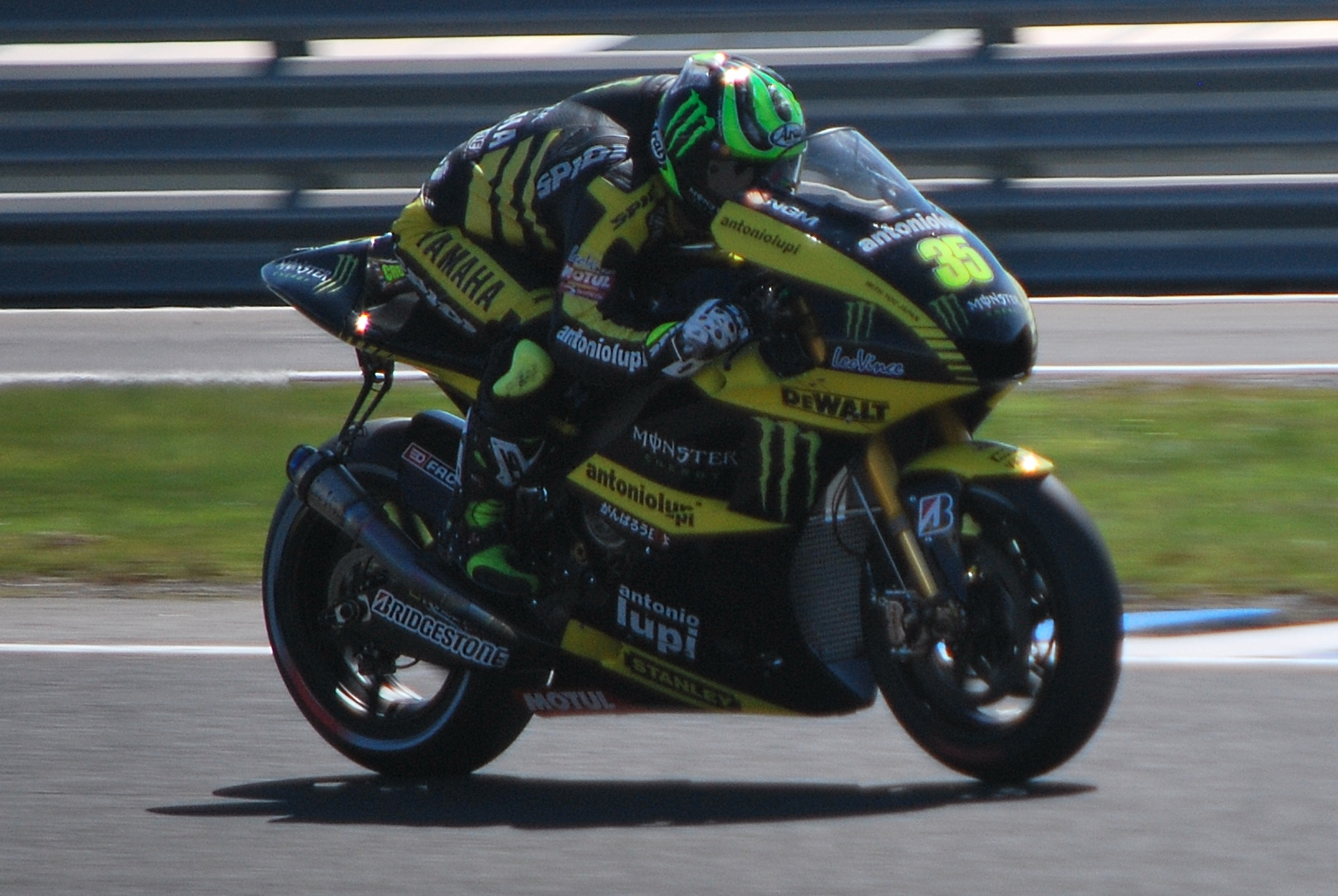
Crutchlow at the 2011 Australian Grand Prix

It was officially announced on 5 September 2010 that Crutchlow would join Tech 3 for the 2011 MotoGP Championship. Crutchlow ended the season in 12th position in the championship, and won the Rookie of the Year Award after achieving his best result of the season – fourth place – in Valencia.

Crutchlow got off to a good start in the 2012 championship. In Losail, he secured third position on the starting grid, and finished in fourth place ahead of teammate Andrea Dovizioso. This was his first time qualifying on the front row: his father lost a bet with Wilco Zeelenberg and had to shave off his 40-year-old moustache. Crutchlow suffered disappointment at Silverstone when he crashed at Chapel Corner during practice. Early x-rays showed no break to his ankle, but it was clear he was in considerable pain. Further examination showed a broken and dislocated left ankle, and raised questions over Crutchlow's participation in the race. He was given the all clear by doctors, and passed a fitness test at the circuit. Starting at the back of the grid, Crutchlow raced with characteristic determination, and finished in a highly commendable sixth place. Overall, Crutchlow had a positive season, running consistently within the top-five riders and obtaining two podium finishes – third place on both occasions – in the Czech Republic and in Australia. He finished seventh in the championship,

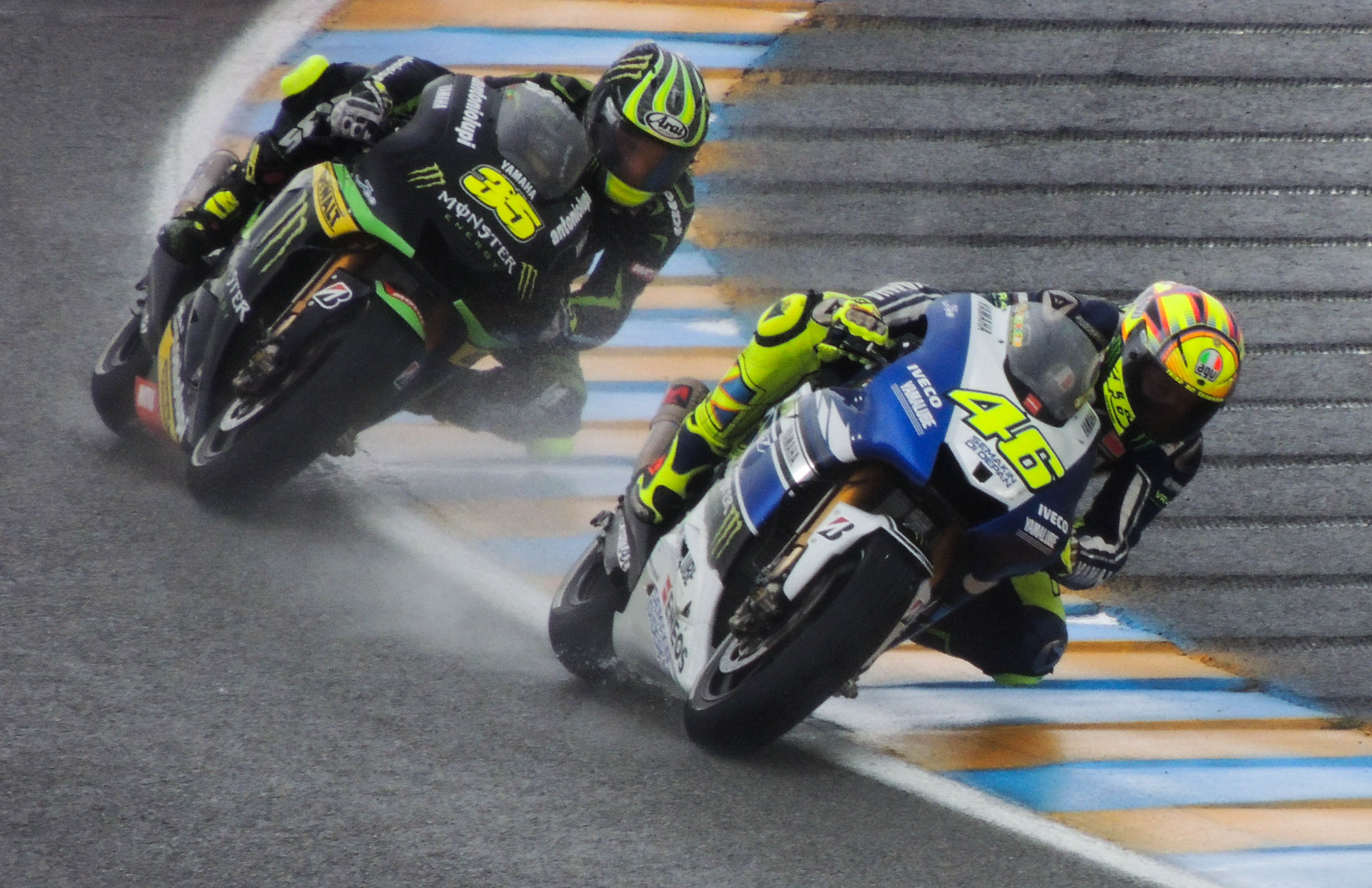
Crutchlow battling with Valentino Rossi at the 2013 French Grand Prix, where he finished second

Crutchlow had an excellent season in 2013. He took four podiums within a five-race midseason stretch: he finished second in Le Mans, and third in Mugello. He qualified second in Catalonia but lost the front end with 20 laps remaining and retired. He then set the first MotoGP pole of his career in Assen, finishing third, and took another second place finish in Germany. Throughout the season, Crutchlow battled consistently among the second group of riders, along with Andrea Dovizioso, Stefan Bradl and Álvaro Bautista. He finished the championship in fifth place, and took a career-best 188 points.

==== Ducati Team (2014) ====
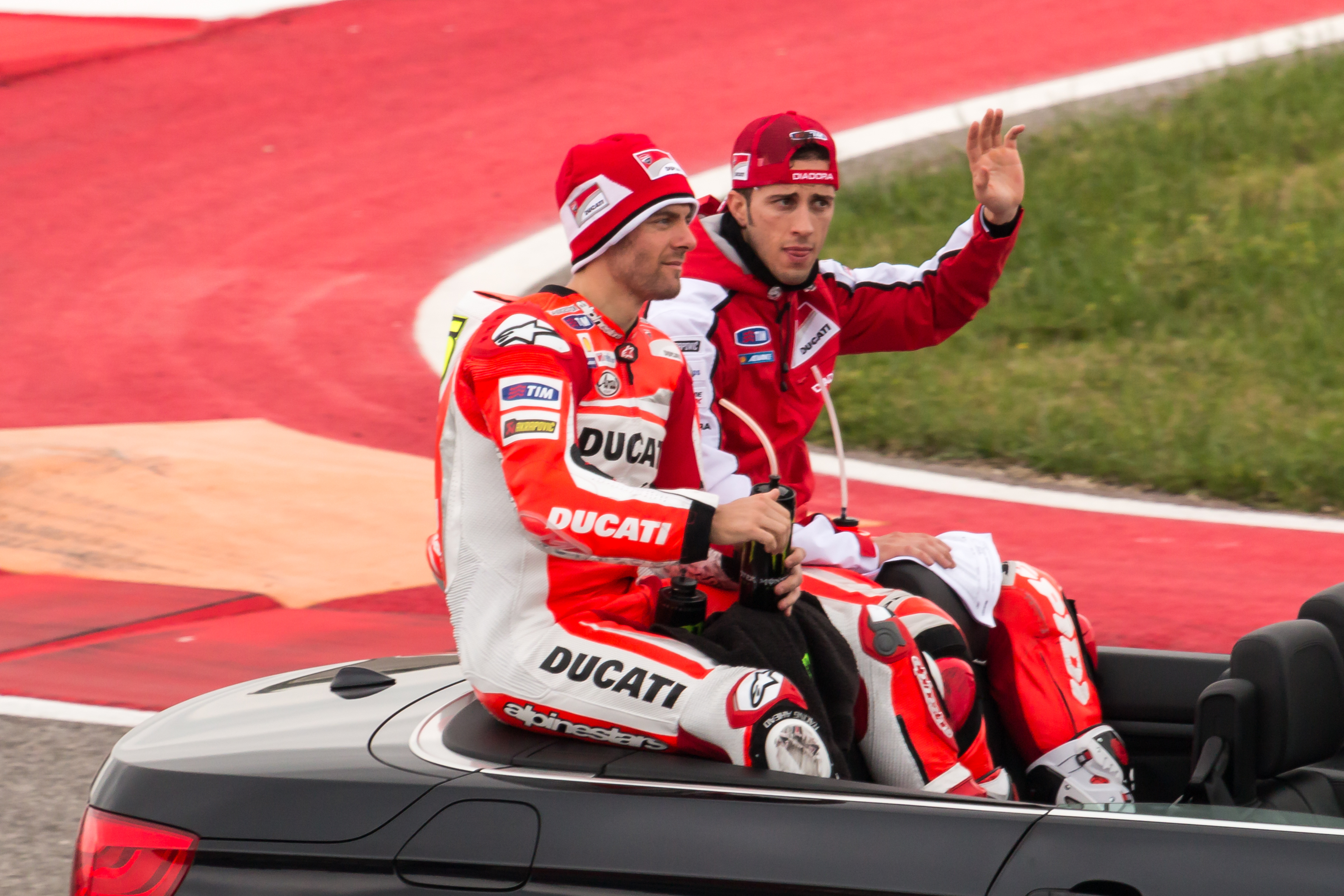
Crutchlow (left) with Ducati teammate Andrea Dovizioso

On 2 August 2013, it was announced that Crutchlow had signed a two-year deal with the factory Ducati team, to partner Andrea Dovizioso. The beginning of his season was plagued with issues. A malfunctioning transponder caused the electronics of his Ducati Desmosedici to behave strangely during the first race in Qatar, where he finished in sixth place. He experienced tyre issues and later crashed out of the race in Austin. In the crash he suffered a hand injury, causing him to miss the Argentine Grand Prix and thus missing a championship race for the first time in his career. He returned in Jerez, but he was forced to retire after three laps, having experienced problems with the brakes. He achieved his sole podium with Ducati in Aragon, finishing in third place. He finished the season in a disappointing thirteenth place.

==== LCR Honda (2015–2020) ====
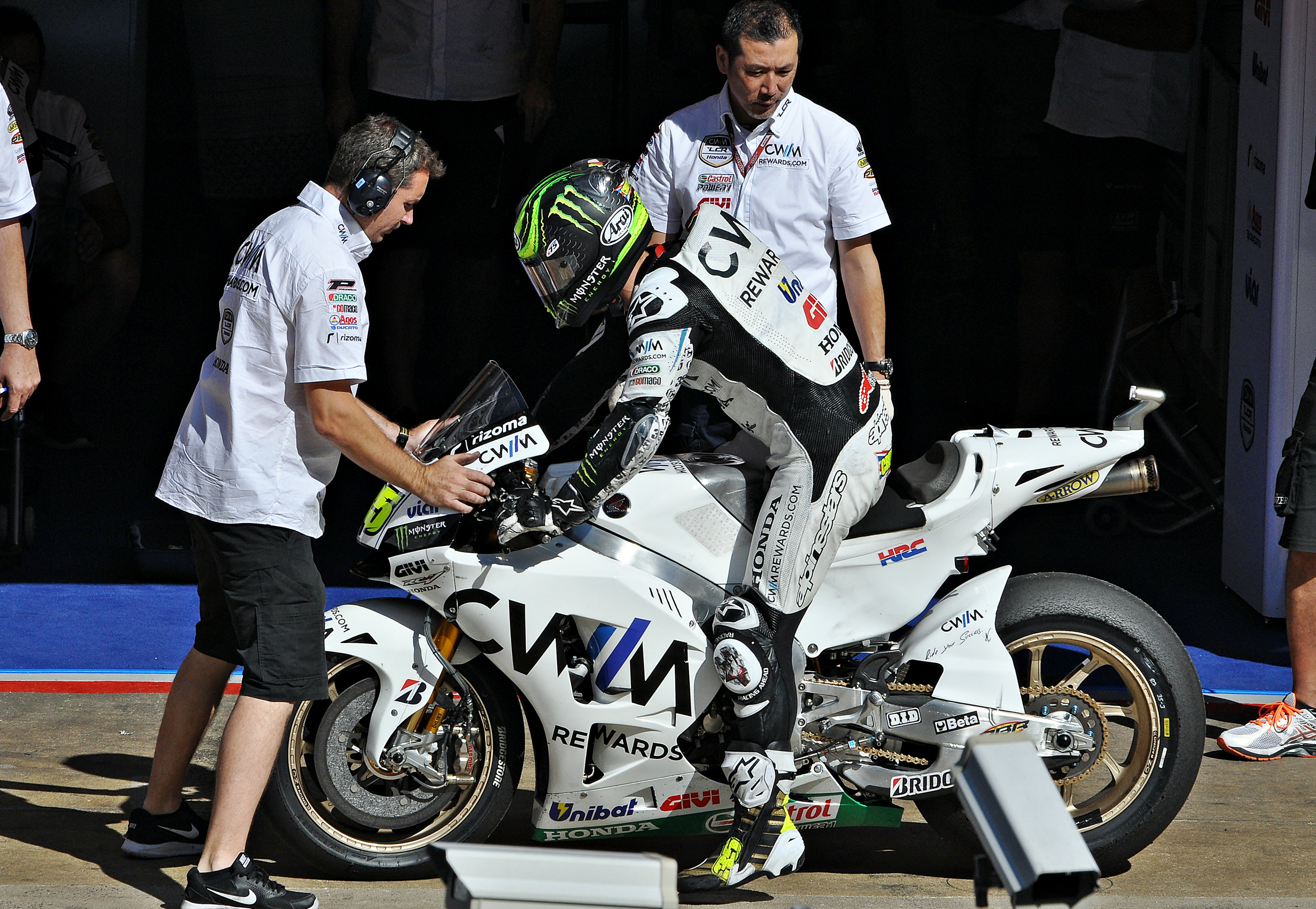
Crutchlow at the 2015 Catalan Grand Prix

On 2 August 2014, exactly a year after joining the team, it was announced that Crutchlow was leaving Ducati. Later the same day, it was announced that Crutchlow had signed for LCR Honda for the 2015 season, replacing Stefan Bradl on the factory-specification RC213V.

Crutchlow started the 2015 season with seventh-place finishes in Qatar and Austin. He then achieved his first podium with his new team, a third-place finish in Argentina after a last-lap pass on Andrea Iannone. This was LCR's first podium since Stefan Bradl finished second at the 2013 United States Grand Prix. Crutchlow retired from each of the next three races on the calendar, in France, Italy and Catalunya, before a sixth-place finish in the Netherlands and a seventh-place finish in Germany. Crutchlow finished eighth in the championship.

Crutchlow's 2016 season began inauspiciously, with four retirements in the first eight races. His season began to turn around in a chaotic flag-to-flag race in Germany, where he powered through tricky conditions to set the fastest lap and finish in second place. He won his first race at the wet Czech Republic GP. This win ended a 35-year dry spell for British riders in the premier class, since Barry Sheene won the 1981 Swedish Grand Prix. The next race weekend, Crutchlow set pole and took second place at his home GP in Silverstone. Crutchlow capped off his season by taking his second premier class victory in Australia, his first dry win. He was the first Briton ever to win the Australian Grand Prix. He retired from the last two races in Malaysia and Valencia. After an uneven season, Crutchlow ended the year with 141 points, seventh in the championship.

Crutchlow crashed at out at the 2017 season opener in Qatar, but rallied at the second race in Argentina to take a third place podium. He did not score another podium for the rest of the season, but rode with relative consistency, taking six other top-five finishes. He finished the season in ninth, and extended his contract with LCR Honda until 2019.

Crutchlow achieved his third and final premier class win at the second race of the 2018 season in Argentina. He set pole at Jerez, but slipped back through the grid and crashed six laps in; he attempted to remount his bike but was forced to retire. He took further podium finishes in Misano and Japan. During practice for Australia, he fell at the first corner and shattered his right ankle. Despite missing the final three races of the season due to injury, he finished seventh in the championship, the second Honda behind Marc Márquez.

After a long winter spent rehabilitating his ankle, Crutchlow returned to the grid for 2019 and was rewarded with a third place finish at the first race in Qatar. He took further podiums in Germany and Australia, the site of the previous year's accident. He also suffered six retirements on the increasingly fractious RC213V, but finished the season in ninth place, and was once again the second Honda behind Márquez.

Crutchlow struggled during the 2020 season, which was truncated due to the COVID-19 pandemic. Plagued by injuries and retirements, he scored two lone top-ten finishes, in Catalonia and Aragon. He finished the season in eighteenth place.

==== Yamaha Motor Racing (2021–2025) ====
In November 2020, it was announced Crutchlow was contracted for the 2021 season as a test rider with the Yamaha factory team, replacing Jorge Lorenzo.

In August 2021, Yamaha arranged for Crutchlow to return to the grid as a replacement for Petronas Yamaha SRT rider Franco Morbidelli, who was recovering from knee surgery. Crutchlow rode in the Styrian GP in Austria, and placed seventeenth out of 18 finishers. The following weekend on the same circuit at the Austrian GP, Crutchlow again placed seventeenth, out of 17 finishers. In late August, Crutchlow stepped in for the factory team at Silverstone, where he also finished seventeenth.

In 2022, Crutchlow stepped in as a replacement for Andrea Dovizioso at RNF Racing, after the Italian opted to retire from racing midseason. Crutchlow rode in the last six races of the season, with his best finish a twelfth place in Malaysia. In 2023, Crutchlow raced at the Japanese Grand Prix for Yamaha as a wildcard. He finished 13th, in a race heavily affected by rain which was ultimately red flagged on lap 13 of 24. After the event, he accepted a three year contract extension as a Yamaha test rider.

Crutchlow was due to compete in as a wild card at the British, Italian and San Marino Grand Prix in 2024. However, he withdrew from all three events due to injuries and surgery. In April 2025, Crutchlow returned to testing for Yamaha after nearly a year on the sidelines. In September 2025, Yamaha announced Crutchlow would no longer be a test rider, with Augusto Fernández and Andrea Dovizioso being retained instead.

==== LCR Honda stand-in (2026) ====
In 2026, Crutchlow made a surprise return to MotoGP after a three-year absence. He was drafted by LCR Honda as a replacement rider for the severely injured Johann Zarco. Crutchlow made his redebut in Italy, and continued to deputise for Zarco at the Hungarian, Czech, Dutch and German Grand Prix.

== Personal life ==
Crutchlow married Lucy Heron in January 2014, announcing on Twitter that he and Lucy welcomed their first child, a girl named Willow, on 2 August 2016. At the Austrian Grand Prix later that month, Crutchlow wore a special helmet to celebrate her birth.

Crutchlow is based in Ramsey, Isle of Man, but spends his time during the racing season in Tuscany, where he has owned a home since 2012. Crutchlow has ridden several exhibition laps around the Isle of Man TT Course.

In late 2018, Crutchlow suffered severe lower-leg injuries in a crash at Phillip Island, Australia. He has a home in California and spends time there during the northern-hemisphere winter when there is no racing.

== Career statistics ==
=== All-time statistics ===
Seasons	Series	Races	Poles	Podiums	**Wins**	**2nd place**	**3rd place**	Fastest laps	Titles
2008, 2010	World Superbike (SBK)	30	6	11	3	2	6	8	0
2005–2006, 2009	World Supersport (SSP)	17	10	10	5	3	2	9	1
2007–2008	British Superbike (BSB)	50	4	13	2	4	7	0	0
2004–2006	British Supersport (BSS)	36	0	17	8	4	5	0	1

=== Races by year ===
==== British Supersport Championship ====
(key)

Year	Bike	1	2	3	4	5	6	7	8	9	10	11	12	13	Pos	Pts
2004	Honda	SIL; 7	BHI; Ret	SNE; Ret	OUL; 5	MON; 5	SNE; 15	BHGP	KNO; 7	MAL; 7	CRO; 9	CAD; Ret	OUL; 7	DON; 7	10th	75
2005	Honda	BHI; Ret	THR; 7	MAL; 4	OUL; 2	MON; 4	CRO	KNO; 8	SNE; 3	SIL; 3	CAD; 1	OUL; 1	DON; Ret	BHGP; 3	**3rd***	**161**
2006	Honda	BHI; 2	DON; 1	THR; 3	OUL; 2	MON	MAL; 1	SNE; 2	KNO; 1	OUL; 1	CRO; Ret	CAD; 3	SIL; 1	BHGP; 1	**1st**	**242**

^{*} Both Easton and Cal Crutchlow finished on 161 thus sharing 3rd place.

==== British Superbike Championship ====
(key)

Year	Bike	1		2		3		4		5		6		7		8		9		10		11		12		13		Pos	Pts	Ref
Year	Bike	R1	R2	R1	R2	R1	R2	R1	R2	R1	R2	R1	R2	R1	R2	R1	R2	R1	R2	R1	R2	R1	R2	R1	R2	R1	R2	Pos	Pts	Ref
2007	Suzuki	BHGP; 13	BHGP; 18	THR; 7	THR; Ret	SIL; 11	SIL; 7	OUL; 7	OUL; Ret	SNE; 8	SNE; Ret	MON; 8	MON; Ret	KNO; 11	KNO; Ret	OUL; 5	OUL; Ret	MAL; 9	MAL; 5	CRO; 4	CRO; 13	CAD; 5	CAD; 4	DON; Ret	DON; Ret	BHI; 5	BHI; 3	9th	152	
2008	Honda	BHGP; C	BHGP; C	THR; 2	THR; 1	OUL; 6	OUL; Ret	BHGP; 3	BHGP; 1	DON; 6	DON; 3	SNE; 4	SNE; 3	MAL; 3	MAL; 3	OUL; 6	OUL; 2	KNO; Ret	KNO; 7	CAD; 5	CAD; 13	CRO; 4	CRO; 3	SIL; 2	SIL; Ret	BHI; 2	BHI; 4	**3rd**	**318**	

==== Supersport World Championship ====
(key) (Races in bold indicate pole position; races in italics indicate fastest lap)

Year	Bike	1	2	3	4	5	6	7	8	9	10	11	12	13	14	Pos	Pts	Ref
2005	Honda	QAT	AUS	ESP	ITA	EUR; Ret	SMR	CZE	GBR; 10	NED	GER	ITA	FRA			27th	6	
2006	Honda	QAT	AUS	ESP	ITA	EUR	SMR	CZE	GBR; 5	NED	GER	ITA	FRA			29th	11	
2009	Yamaha	AUS; 4	**QAT**; 3	**SPA**; 1	**NED**; 2	**ITA**; 1	**RSA**; 2	USA; 3	SMR; 1	**GBR**; 1	**CZE**; Ret	**GER**; 1	**ITA**; Ret	**FRA**; 2	POR; 4	**1st**	**243**	

==== Superbike World Championship ====
(key) (Races in bold indicate pole position; races in italics indicate fastest lap)

Year	Bike	1		2		3		4		5		6		7		8		9		10		11		12		13		14		Pos	Pts	Ref
Year	Bike	R1	R2	R1	R2	R1	R2	R1	R2	R1	R2	R1	R2	R1	R2	R1	R2	R1	R2	R1	R2	R1	R2	R1	R2	R1	R2	R1	R2	Pos	Pts	Ref
2008	Honda	QAT	QAT	AUS	AUS	ESP	ESP	NED	NED	ITA	ITA	USA	USA	GER	GER	SMR	SMR	CZE	CZE	GBR	GBR	EUR; Ret	EUR; 2	ITA	ITA	FRA	FRA	POR; 4	POR; 9	23rd	27	
2010	Yamaha	AUS; Ret	AUS; 9	**POR**; 14	**POR**; 3	**SPA**; 7	**SPA**; 9	NED; 8	NED; Ret	ITA; 3	ITA; Ret	**RSA**; 8	**RSA**; 4	USA; 11	USA; 3	SMR; Ret	SMR; 4	**CZE**; 3	**CZE**; 14	**GBR**; 1	**GBR**; 1	GER; 3	GER; 4	ITA; 10	ITA; 3	**FRA**; 1	**FRA**; 2			5th	284	

=== Grand Prix motorcycle racing ===
==== By season ====
Season	Class	Motorcycle	Team	Race	Win	Podium	Pole	FLap	Pts	Plcd
2011	MotoGP	Yamaha YZR-M1	Monster Yamaha Tech 3	16	0	0	0	0	70	12th
2012	MotoGP	Yamaha YZR-M1	Monster Yamaha Tech 3	18	0	2	0	1	151	7th
2013	MotoGP	Yamaha YZR-M1	Monster Yamaha Tech 3	18	0	4	2	0	188	5th
2014	MotoGP	Ducati Desmosedici GP14	Ducati Team	17	0	1	0	0	74	13th
2015	MotoGP	Honda RC213V	CWM LCR Honda	18	0	1	0	0	125	8th
2016	MotoGP	Honda RC213V	LCR Honda	18	2	4	1	3	141	7th
2017	MotoGP	Honda RC213V	LCR Honda	18	0	1	0	0	112	9th
2018	MotoGP	Honda RC213V	LCR Honda	15	1	3	1	0	148	7th
2019	MotoGP	Honda RC213V	LCR Honda Castrol	19	0	3	0	0	133	9th
2020	MotoGP	Honda RC213V	LCR Honda Castrol	11	0	0	0	0	32	18th
2021	MotoGP	Yamaha YZR-M1	Petronas Yamaha SRT	2	0	0	0	0	0	28th
2021	MotoGP	Yamaha YZR-M1	Monster Energy Yamaha MotoGP	2	0	0	0	0	0	28th
2022	MotoGP	Yamaha YZR-M1	WithU Yamaha RNF MotoGP Team	5	0	0	0	0	10	25th
2023	MotoGP	Yamaha YZR-M1	Yamalube RS4GP Racing Team	1	0	0	0	0	3	29th
2026	MotoGP	Honda RC213V	Castrol Honda LCR	2	0	0	0	0	0	26th
Total				**181**	**3**	**19**	**4**	**4**	**1187**	

==== By class ====
Class	Seasons	1st GP	1st Pod	1st Win	Race	Win	Podiums	Pole	FLap	Pts	WChmp
MotoGP	2011–2023, 2026	2011 Qatar	2012 Czech Republic	2016 Czech Republic	181	3	19	4	4	1187	0
Total	2011–2023, 2026				**181**	**3**	**19**	**4**	**4**	**1187**	**0**

==== Races by year ====
(key) (Races in bold indicate pole position; races in italics indicate fastest lap)

Year	Class	Bike	1	2	3	4	5	6	7	8	9	10	11	12	13	14	15	16	17	18	19	20	21	22	Pos	Pts
2011	MotoGP	Yamaha	QAT; 11	SPA; 8	POR; 8	FRA; Ret	CAT; 7	GBR; DNS	NED; 14	ITA; Ret	GER; 14	USA; Ret	CZE; Ret	INP; 11	RSM; 10	ARA; 9	JPN; 11	AUS; Ret	MAL; C	VAL; 4					12th	70
2012	MotoGP	Yamaha	QAT; 4	SPA; 4	POR; 5	FRA; 8	CAT; 5	GBR; 6	NED; 5	GER; 8	ITA; 6	USA; 5	INP; Ret	CZE; 3	RSM; Ret	ARA; 4	JPN; Ret	MAL; Ret	AUS; 3	VAL; Ret					7th	151
2013	MotoGP	Yamaha	QAT; 5	AME; 4	SPA; 5	FRA; 2	ITA; 3	CAT; Ret	**NED**; 3	GER; 2	USA; 7	INP; 5	**CZE**; 17	GBR; 7	RSM; 6	ARA; 6	MAL; 6	AUS; 4	JPN; 7	VAL; Ret					5th	188
2014	MotoGP	Ducati	QAT; 6	AME; Ret	ARG	SPA; Ret	FRA; 11	ITA; Ret	CAT; Ret	NED; 9	GER; 10	INP; 8	CZE; Ret	GBR; 12	RSM; 9	ARA; 3	JPN; Ret	AUS; Ret	MAL; Ret	VAL; 5					13th	74
2015	MotoGP	Honda	QAT; 7	AME; 7	ARG; 3	SPA; 4	FRA; Ret	ITA; Ret	CAT; Ret	NED; 6	GER; 7	INP; 8	CZE; Ret	GBR; Ret	RSM; 11	ARA; 7	JPN; 6	AUS; 7	MAL; 5	VAL; 9					8th	125
2016	MotoGP	Honda	QAT; Ret	ARG; Ret	AME; 17	SPA; 11	FRA; Ret	ITA; 11	CAT; 6	NED; Ret	GER; 2	AUT; 15	CZE; 1	**GBR**; 2	RSM; 8	ARA; 5	JPN; 5	AUS; 1	MAL; Ret	VAL; Ret					7th	141
2017	MotoGP	Honda	QAT; Ret	ARG; 3	AME; 4	SPA; Ret	FRA; 5	ITA; Ret	CAT; 11	NED; 4	GER; 10	CZE; 5	AUT; 15	GBR; 4	RSM; 13	ARA; Ret	JPN; Ret	AUS; 5	MAL; 15	VAL; 8					9th	112
2018	MotoGP	Honda	QAT; 4	ARG; 1	AME; 19	**SPA**; Ret	FRA; 8	ITA; 6	CAT; 4	NED; 6	GER; Ret	CZE; 5	AUT; 4	GBR; C	RSM; 3	ARA; Ret	THA; 7	JPN; 2	AUS; DNS	MAL	VAL				7th	148
2019	MotoGP	Honda	QAT; 3	ARG; 13	AME; Ret	SPA; 8	FRA; 9	ITA; 8	CAT; Ret	NED; 7	GER; 3	CZE; 5	AUT; Ret	GBR; 6	RSM; Ret	ARA; 6	THA; 12	JPN; 5	AUS; 2	MAL; Ret	VAL; Ret				9th	133
2020	MotoGP	Honda	SPA; DNS	ANC; 13	CZE; 13	AUT; 15	STY; 17	RSM; DNS	EMI	CAT; 10	FRA; Ret	ARA; 8	TER; 11	EUR; Ret	VAL; 13	POR; 13									18th	32
2021	MotoGP	Yamaha	QAT	DOH	POR	SPA	FRA	ITA	CAT	GER	NED	STY; 17	AUT; 17	GBR; 17	ARA; 16	RSM	AME	EMI	ALR	VAL					28th	0
2022	MotoGP	Yamaha	QAT	INA	ARG	AME	POR	SPA	FRA	ITA	CAT	GER	NED	GBR	AUT	RSM	ARA; 14	JPN; 15	THA; 19	AUS; 13	MAL; 12	VAL; 16			25th	10
2023	MotoGP	Yamaha	POR	ARG	AME	SPA	FRA	ITA	GER	NED	GBR	AUT	CAT	RSM	IND	JPN; 13	INA	AUS	THA	MAL	QAT	VAL			29th	3
2026	MotoGP	Honda	THA	BRA	USA	SPA	FRA	CAT	ITA; Ret	HUN; 16	CZE; 17	NED; 16	GER; Ret	GBR	ARA	RSM	AUT	JPN	INA	AUS	MAL	QAT	POR	VAL	25th*	0*

* Season still in progress.
