= 2009 Losail Superbike World Championship round =

(Qatar) 2009 Losail Superbike World Championship round
Round details
- Round 2 of 14 rounds in the 2009 Superbike World Championship. and Round 2 of 14 rounds in the 2009 Supersport World Championship.
- Date: March 14, 2009
- Location: Losail Circuit
- Course: Permanent racing facility 5.380 km (3.343 mi)

Superbike World Championship
Pole position
(United States) Ben Spies
1:57.280
Fastest lap race 1	Fastest lap race 2
(Japan) Noriyuki Haga	(United States) Ben Spies
1:59.511	1:59.041

Supersport World Championship
Pole position
(United Kingdom) Cal Crutchlow
2:01.586
Fastest lap
(Australia) Andrew Pitt
2:02.577

The 2009 Losail Superbike World Championship round was the second round of the 2009 Superbike World Championship season. It took place on the weekend of March 12–14, 2009, at the Losail International Circuit in Qatar.

== Results ==
=== Superbike race 1 ===
Pos	No	Rider	Bike	Laps	Time	Grid	Points
1	19	(United States) Ben Spies	Yamaha YZF-R1	18	36:06.304	1	25
2	41	(Japan) Noriyuki Haga	Ducati 1098R	18	+1.893	4	20
3	3	(Italy) Max Biaggi	Aprilia RSV 4	18	+2.168	3	16
4	56	(Japan) Shinya Nakano	Aprilia RSV 4	18	+12.061	6	13
5	7	(Spain) Carlos Checa	Honda CBR1000RR	18	+12.597	7	11
6	67	(United Kingdom) Shane Byrne	Ducati 1098R	18	+12.971	8	10
7	66	(United Kingdom) Tom Sykes	Yamaha YZF-R1	18	+13.570	5	9
8	9	(Japan) Ryuichi Kiyonari	Honda CBR1000RR	18	+19.306	12	8
9	11	(Australia) Troy Corser	BMW S1000RR	18	+19.388	16	7
10	55	(France) Régis Laconi	Ducati 1098R	18	+20.981	11	6
11	91	(United Kingdom) Leon Haslam	Honda CBR1000RR	18	+21.164	18	5
12	65	(United Kingdom) Jonathan Rea	Honda CBR1000RR	18	+21.994	17	4
13	111	(Spain) Ruben Xaus	BMW S1000RR	18	+22.917	15	3
14	23	(Australia) Broc Parkes	Kawasaki ZX-10R	18	+27.218	13	2
15	33	(United Kingdom) Tommy Hill	Honda CBR1000RR	18	+31.602	20	1
16	31	(Australia) Karl Muggeridge	Suzuki GSX-R1000 K9	18	+33.934	21	
17	99	(Italy) Luca Scassa	Kawasaki ZX-10R	18	+47.496	27	
18	25	(Spain) David Salom	Kawasaki ZX-10R	18	+47.505	23	
19	15	(Italy) Matteo Baiocco	Kawasaki ZX-10R	18	+59.278	28	
20	77	(Italy) Vittorio Iannuzzo	Honda CBR1000RR	18	+59.295	25	
21	24	(Australia) Brendan Roberts	Ducati 1098R	18	+59.338	24	
22	71	(Japan) Yukio Kagayama	Suzuki GSX-R1000 K9	18	+1:04.008	14	
Ret	86	(Italy) Ayrton Badovini	Kawasaki ZX-10R	10	Mechanical	26	
Ret	84	(Italy) Michel Fabrizio	Ducati 1098R	7	Accident	10	
Ret	96	(Czech Republic) Jakub Smrž	Ducati 1098R	6	Accident	2	
Ret	76	(Germany) Max Neukirchner	Suzuki GSX-R1000 K9	5	Accident	19	
Ret	44	(Italy) Roberto Rolfo	Honda CBR1000RR	3	Mechanical	9	
DNS	100	(Japan) Makoto Tamada	Kawasaki ZX-10R			22	

=== Superbike race 2 ===
Pos	No	Rider	Bike	Laps	Time	Grid	Points
1	19	(United States) Ben Spies	Yamaha YZF-R1	18	36:02.126	1	25
2	41	(Japan) Noriyuki Haga	Ducati 1098R	18	+1.274	4	20
3	3	(Italy) Max Biaggi	Aprilia RSV 4	18	+1.622	3	16
4	9	(Japan) Ryuichi Kiyonari	Honda CBR1000RR	18	+1.845	12	13
5	66	(United Kingdom) Tom Sykes	Yamaha YZF-R1	18	+5.117	5	11
6	76	(Germany) Max Neukirchner	Suzuki GSX-R1000 K9	18	+9.512	19	10
7	56	(Japan) Shinya Nakano	Aprilia RSV 4	18	+9.514	6	9
8	65	(United Kingdom) Jonathan Rea	Honda CBR1000RR	18	+12.621	17	8
9	11	(Australia) Troy Corser	BMW S1000RR	18	+13.842	16	7
10	111	(Spain) Ruben Xaus	BMW S1000RR	18	+13.884	15	6
11	91	(United Kingdom) Leon Haslam	Honda CBR1000RR	18	+13.888	18	5
12	67	(United Kingdom) Shane Byrne	Ducati 1098R	18	+14.913	8	4
13	7	(Spain) Carlos Checa	Honda CBR1000RR	18	+15.762	7	3
14	55	(France) Régis Laconi	Ducati 1098R	18	+15.920	11	2
15	71	(Japan) Yukio Kagayama	Suzuki GSX-R1000 K9	18	+19.565	14	1
16	23	(Australia) Broc Parkes	Kawasaki ZX-10R	18	+21.759	13	
17	96	(Czech Republic) Jakub Smrž	Ducati 1098R	18	+28.523	2	
18	31	(Australia) Karl Muggeridge	Suzuki GSX-R1000 K9	18	+40.499	21	
19	24	(Australia) Brendan Roberts	Ducati 1098R	18	+43.761	24	
20	99	(Italy) Luca Scassa	Kawasaki ZX-10R	18	+44.669	27	
21	77	(Italy) Vittorio Iannuzzo	Honda CBR1000RR	18	+48.955	25	
22	15	(Italy) Matteo Baiocco	Kawasaki ZX-10R	15	+3 Laps	28	
Ret	44	(Italy) Roberto Rolfo	Honda CBR1000RR	17	Retirement	9	
Ret	84	(Italy) Michel Fabrizio	Ducati 1098R	13	Retirement	10	
Ret	25	(Spain) David Salom	Kawasaki ZX-10R	8	Retirement	23	
Ret	33	(United Kingdom) Tommy Hill	Honda CBR1000RR	6	Mechanical	20	
Ret	86	(Italy) Ayrton Badovini	Kawasaki ZX-10R	1	Retirement	26	
DNS	100	(Japan) Makoto Tamada	Kawasaki ZX-10R			22	

=== Supersport race ===
Pos	No	Rider	Bike	Laps	Time	Grid	Points
1	50	(Republic of Ireland) Eugene Laverty	Honda CBR600RR	18	37:06.285	2	25
2	1	(Australia) Andrew Pitt	Honda CBR600RR	18	+0.063	4	20
3	35	(United Kingdom) Cal Crutchlow	Yamaha YZF-R6	18	+0.625	1	16
4	54	(Turkey) Kenan Sofuoğlu	Honda CBR600RR	18	+0.711	3	13
5	127	(Denmark) Robbin Harms	Honda CBR600RR	18	+5.200	8	11
6	14	(France) Matthieu Lagrive	Honda CBR600RR	18	+5.233	6	10
7	24	(Australia) Garry McCoy	Triumph Daytona 675	18	+9.538	9	9
8	55	(Italy) Massimo Roccoli	Honda CBR600RR	18	+9.551	17	8
9	13	(Australia) Anthony West	Honda CBR600RR	18	+9.616	12	7
10	77	(Netherlands) Barry Veneman	Suzuki GSX-R600	18	+12.159	18	6
11	51	(Italy) Michele Pirro	Yamaha YZF-R6	18	+15.044	11	5
12	117	(Portugal) Miguel Praia	Honda CBR600RR	18	+17.611	14	4
13	26	(Spain) Joan Lascorz	Kawasaki ZX-6R	18	+17.701	15	3
14	105	(Italy) Gianluca Vizziello	Honda CBR600RR	18	+19.897	19	2
15	8	(Australia) Mark Aitchison	Honda CBR600RR	18	+35.382	10	1
16	9	(Italy) Danilo Dell'Omo	Honda CBR600RR	18	+35.701	21	
17	28	(Netherlands) Arie Vos	Honda CBR600RR	18	+36.239	23	
18	83	(Australia) Russell Holland	Honda CBR600RR	18	+36.406	24	
19	69	(Italy) Gianluca Nannelli	Triumph Daytona 675	18	+40.548	7	
20	5	(Indonesia) Doni Tata Pradita	Yamaha YZF-R6	18	+58.948	28	
21	88	(Spain) Yannick Guerra	Yamaha YZF-R6	18	+1:01.386	29	
22	32	(Italy) Fabrizio Lai	Honda CBR600RR	18	+1:18.036	27	
23	78	(Australia) Shaun Geronimi	Suzuki GSX-R600	18	+1:22.281	30	
Ret	21	(Japan) Katsuaki Fujiwara	Kawasaki ZX-6R	14	Mechanical	13	
Ret	30	(Germany) Jesco Günther	Honda CBR600RR	13	Accident	20	
Ret	99	(France) Fabien Foret	Yamaha YZF-R6	2	Accident	5	
Ret	19	(Poland) Pawel Szkopek	Triumph Daytona 675	1	Accident	16	
Ret	7	(Czech Republic) Patrik Vostárek	Honda CBR600RR	1	Accident	22	
Ret	96	(Czech Republic) Matej Smrž	Triumph Daytona 675	1	Accident	25	
Ret	71	(Spain) José Morillas	Yamaha YZF-R6	1	Accident	26	
