= 2009 Miller Superbike World Championship round =

(United States) 2009 Miller Superbike World Championship round
Round details
- Round 7 of 14 rounds in the 2009 Superbike World Championship. and Round 7 of 14 rounds in the 2009 Supersport World Championship.
- Date: May 31, 2009
- Location: Miller Motorsports Park
- Course: Permanent racing facility 4.907 km (3.049 mi)

Superbike World Championship
Pole position
(United States) Ben Spies
1:48.344
Fastest lap race 1	Fastest lap race 2
(United States) Ben Spies	(United States) Ben Spies
1:48.965	1:48.768

Supersport World Championship
Pole position
(Spain) Joan Lascorz
1:51.749
Fastest lap
(Turkey) Kenan Sofuoglu
1:52.285

The 2009 Miller Superbike World Championship round was the seventh round of the 2009 Superbike World Championship season. It took place on the weekend of May 29–31, 2009 at Miller Motorsports Park in Tooele, Utah.

== Results ==
=== Superbike race 1 ===
Race 1 was stopped after lap 7 for a crash involving Karl Muggeridge. The race was then restarted and completed; the final standings are the aggregate of the times of the two heats.

Pos	No	Rider	Bike	Laps	Time	Grid	Points
1	19	(United States) Ben Spies	Yamaha YZF-R1	21	38:30.945	1	25
2	7	(Spain) Carlos Checa	Honda CBR1000RR	21	+9.394	2	20
3	84	(Italy) Michel Fabrizio	Ducati 1098R	21	+12.742	4	16
4	9	(Japan) Ryuichi Kiyonari	Honda CBR1000RR	21	+14.276	3	13
5	65	(United Kingdom) Jonathan Rea	Honda CBR1000RR	21	+14.915	11	11
6	3	(Italy) Max Biaggi	Aprilia RSV 4	21	+15.461	16	10
7	2	(United States) Jamie Hacking	Kawasaki ZX-10R	21	+22.901	8	9
8	96	(Czech Republic) Jakub Smrž	Ducati 1098R	21	+25.425	5	8
9	41	(Japan) Noriyuki Haga	Ducati 1098R	21	+25.870	9	7
10	91	(United Kingdom) Leon Haslam	Honda CBR1000RR	21	+26.093	12	6
11	67	(United Kingdom) Shane Byrne	Ducati 1098R	21	+26.181	6	5
12	71	(Japan) Yukio Kagayama	Suzuki GSX-R1000 K9	21	+29.275	13	4
13	66	(United Kingdom) Tom Sykes	Yamaha YZF-R1	21	+38.365	22	3
14	36	(Spain) Gregorio Lavilla	Ducati 1098R	21	+39.454	17	2
15	11	(Australia) Troy Corser	BMW S1000RR	21	+39.513	21	1
16	10	(Spain) Fonsi Nieto	Suzuki GSX-R1000 K9	21	+48.889	14	
17	57	(Italy) Lorenzo Lanzi	Ducati 1098R	21	+50.747	19	
18	98	(United States) Jake Zemke	Honda CBR1000RR	21	+51.446	23	
19	99	(Italy) Luca Scassa	Kawasaki ZX-10R	21	+54.472	15	
20	25	(Spain) David Salom	Kawasaki ZX-10R	21	+58.525	18	
21	111	(Spain) Ruben Xaus	BMW S1000RR	21	+1:07.572	24	
22	64	(France) Erwan Nigon	Yamaha YZF-R1	21	+1'18.092	26	
Ret	23	(Australia) Broc Parkes	Kawasaki ZX-10R	20	Retirement	7	
Ret	56	(Japan) Shinya Nakano	Aprilia RSV 4	5	Accident	10	
Ret	31	(Australia) Karl Muggeridge	Suzuki GSX-R1000 K9	5	Accident	20	
DNS	33	(United Kingdom) Tommy Hill	Honda CBR1000RR		Injured	25	

=== Superbike race 2 ===
Pos	No	Rider	Bike	Laps	Time	Grid	Points
1	19	(United States) Ben Spies	Yamaha YZF-R1	21	38:25.391	1	25
2	84	(Italy) Michel Fabrizio	Ducati 1098R	21	+9.080	4	20
3	65	(United Kingdom) Jonathan Rea	Honda CBR1000RR	21	+14.357	11	16
4	3	(Italy) Max Biaggi	Aprilia RSV 4	21	+15.636	16	13
5	9	(Japan) Ryuichi Kiyonari	Honda CBR1000RR	21	+17.156	3	11
6	96	(Czech Republic) Jakub Smrž	Ducati 1098R	21	+17.546	5	10
7	56	(Japan) Shinya Nakano	Aprilia RSV 4	21	+19.659	10	9
8	41	(Japan) Noriyuki Haga	Ducati 1098R	21	+23.455	9	8
9	66	(United Kingdom) Tom Sykes	Yamaha YZF-R1	21	+30.489	22	7
10	67	(United Kingdom) Shane Byrne	Ducati 1098R	21	+31.775	6	6
11	23	(Australia) Broc Parkes	Kawasaki ZX-10R	21	+33.246	7	5
12	71	(Japan) Yukio Kagayama	Suzuki GSX-R1000 K9	21	+36.758	13	4
13	10	(Spain) Fonsi Nieto	Suzuki GSX-R1000 K9	21	+36.887	14	3
14	57	(Italy) Lorenzo Lanzi	Ducati 1098R	21	+37.290	19	2
15	98	(United States) Jake Zemke	Honda CBR1000RR	21	+42.639	23	1
16	111	(Spain) Ruben Xaus	BMW S1000RR	21	+42.777	24	
17	11	(Australia) Troy Corser	BMW S1000RR	21	+45.596	21	
18	25	(Spain) David Salom	Kawasaki ZX-10R	21	+1:09.237	18	
19	2	(United States) Jamie Hacking	Kawasaki ZX-10R	21	+1:26.703	8	
Ret	91	(United Kingdom) Leon Haslam	Honda CBR1000RR	20	Accident	12	
Ret	36	(Spain) Gregorio Lavilla	Ducati 1098R	6	Accident	17	
Ret	64	(France) Erwan Nigon	Yamaha YZF-R1	6	Retirement	26	
Ret	7	(Spain) Carlos Checa	Honda CBR1000RR	3	Accident	2	
Ret	99	(Italy) Luca Scassa	Kawasaki ZX-10R	3	Accident	15	
DNS	31	(Australia) Karl Muggeridge	Suzuki GSX-R1000 K9		Injured in race 1	20	
DNS	33	(United Kingdom) Tommy Hill	Honda CBR1000RR		Injured	25	

=== Supersport race ===
Pos	No	Rider	Bike	Laps	Time	Grid	Points
1	54	(Turkey) Kenan Sofuoglu	Honda CBR600RR	18	34:00.510	6	25
2	50	(Republic of Ireland) Eugene Laverty	Honda CBR600RR	18	+0.368	2	20
3	35	(United Kingdom) Cal Crutchlow	Yamaha YZF-R6	18	+0.521	3	16
4	26	(Spain) Joan Lascorz	Kawasaki ZX-6R	18	+1.833	1	13
5	99	(France) Fabien Foret	Yamaha YZF-R6	18	+12.071	8	11
6	24	(Australia) Garry McCoy	Triumph Daytona 675	18	+18.108	7	10
7	1	(Australia) Andrew Pitt	Honda CBR600RR	18	+25.912	30	9
8	51	(Italy) Michele Pirro	Yamaha YZF-R6	18	+26.867	12	8
9	14	(France) Matthieu Lagrive	Honda CBR600RR	18	+30.411	13	7
10	13	(Australia) Anthony West	Honda CBR600RR	18	+31.393	22	6
11	5	(Indonesia) Doni Tata Pradita	Yamaha YZF-R6	18	+32.206	21	5
12	117	(Portugal) Miguel Praia	Honda CBR600RR	18	+32.572	14	4
13	21	(Japan) Katsuaki Fujiwara	Kawasaki ZX-6R	18	+35.491	10	3
14	77	(Netherlands) Barry Veneman	Suzuki GSX-R600	18	+37.164	15	2
15	105	(Italy) Gianluca Vizziello	Honda CBR600RR	18	+39.041	18	1
16	69	(Italy) Gianluca Nannelli	Triumph Daytona 675	18	+40.443	4	
17	25	(United Kingdom) Michael Laverty	Yamaha YZF-R6	18	+51.153	16	
18	28	(Netherlands) Arie Vos	Honda CBR600RR	18	+52.658	19	
19	30	(Germany) Jesco Günther	Honda CBR600RR	18	+54.437	24	
20	53	(Italy) Alex Polita	Suzuki GSX-R600	18	+1:11.500	25	
21	83	(Australia) Russell Holland	Honda CBR600RR	18	+1:11.668	20	
22	88	(Spain) Yannick Guerra	Yamaha YZF-R6	18	+1:18.385	26	
23	55	(Italy) Massimo Roccoli	Honda CBR600RR	18	+1:21.462	5	
24	75	(Russia) Oleg Pianykh	Yamaha YZF-R6	18	+1:33.636	29	
25	126	(Canada) Andrew Nelson	Yamaha YZF-R6	18	+1:40.570	28	
26	89	(United States) Chip Yates	Suzuki GSX-R600	17	+1 Lap	31	
Ret	127	(Denmark) Robbin Harms	Honda CBR600RR	17	Mechanical	11	
Ret	7	(Czech Republic) Patrik Vostárek	Honda CBR600RR	7	Mechanical	17	
Ret	29	(United States) Melissa Paris	Yamaha YZF-R6	6	Accident	27	
Ret	8	(Australia) Mark Aitchison	Honda CBR600RR	0	Accident	9	
