= Tommy Hill =

British motorcycle racer

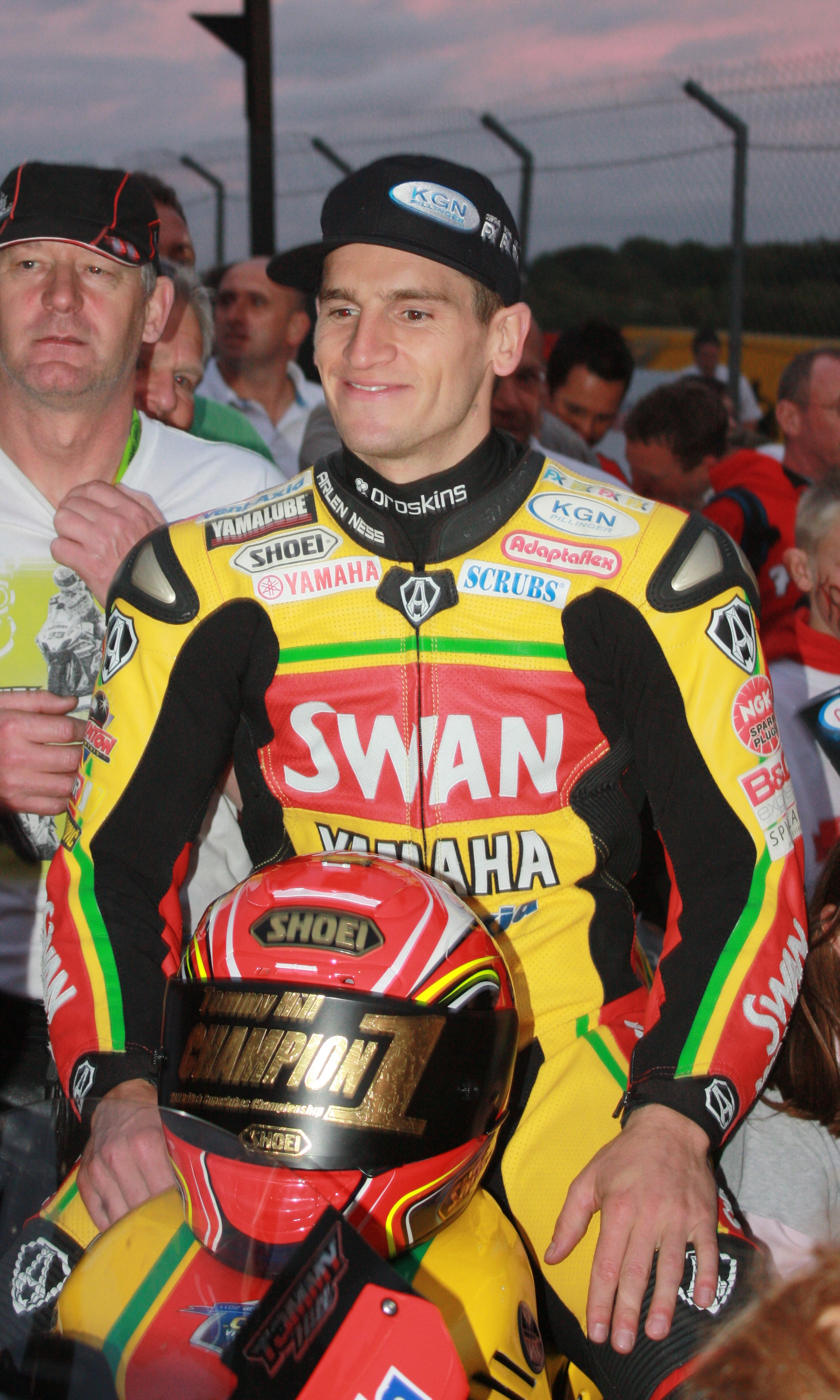
- Hill as the new British Superbike Champion for 2011
- Nationality: English
- Born: 9 February 1985 (age 41); Beckenham, Kent
- Current team: Company Owner – Tommy Hill Promotions – Designer
- Website: tommyracer.com
Motorcycle racing career statistics
British Superbike Championship
Active years	2004-2006, 2009-2011
Championships	1 ( 2011 )
2011 championship position	1st
Starts / Wins / Podiums / Poles / F. laps / Points; 181 / 19 / 51 / 14 / 11 / 987

Thomas Hill (born 9 February 1985) is a British former motorcycle road racer. His greatest success was becoming the British Superbike Champion for 2011. He also competed in the World Superbike and World Supersport championships.

Hill quit motorcycle racing at the end of 2012, instead started working as a self-employed graphic designer, but announced in late 2014 that he would be running a British Superbike team during 2015.

After several months of his first season as a team manager with Be Wiser Kawasaki, Hill left in August 2015, and the team folded in September. Hill announced in October 2015 that he would be running his own team named THM – Tommy Hill Motorsport – for 2016 with Yamaha R1 machines, backed by ePayMe, with riders John Hopkins and Stuart Easton.

== Personal life ==
Hill was born in Beckenham, Kent. His early racing life included a near-fatal motocross accident in which he lost a kidney and his spleen. As a result, medical problems including a bout of food poisoning in 2006 have dogged his career, and require him to take Penicillin every day. His brother Jimmy also raced.

== Starting out ==
Hill switched to road racing in 2001, and first earned his BSB ride by winning the Virgin Mobile Yamaha R6 Cup in 2003, finishing every race in the process.

== British Superbikes 2004–07 ==
In his first BSB season, Hill became the youngest rider ever to start a race on the front row of the grid, and he was the only one of the team's four 2004 riders to be retained for 2005 – team boss Rob McElnea commenting that "He really did prove himself beyond everyone’s expectations this year".

In 2005, Hill took two further front row starts, as well as his first BSB win at Cadwell Park, finishing 12th overall in the series.

For the 2006 British Superbike season, Hill was the only Yamaha rider to retain his ride, leading a young team with Billy McConnell and Kieran Clarke. Hill was also entered for the Superbike World Championship race at Silverstone as a wild card. In changeable qualifying conditions, he stunned the experienced regulars by taking pole position, and then finished both races in the lower reaches of the points. He finished the BSB season eighth overall

In 2007, Hill was joined in the Virgin Yamaha squad by James Haydon, who returned to the team for whom he raced in 2001 and 2004. From 12th on the grid in damp conditions, he briefly led the second race of round 4 at Oulton Park, but ultimately faded to seventh, the Yamaha failing to match other bikes on performance.

Hill also made a handful of World Supersport rides on an SSP Yamaha alongside his 2007 BSB commitments

== World Supersport 2008 ==
For 2008, Hill switched to the series full-time, with the Hannspree Althea Honda team. On his very first test he crashed, breaking his femur, ankle and hand, causing him to miss the first five rounds of the season. Hill returned at the Nürburgring, qualifying in ninth place. But in the race he was involved in an incident at turn one where wildcard rider Arne Tode caused a massive pile-up, and as a result Hill rebroke his femur, putting him out for the rest of the season.

== World Superbikes and return to British Superbikes 2009 – ==
The Althea team kept faith in Hill for 2009, signing him to be their sole World Superbike rider, owing to his BSB experience. However he was uncompetitive, and lost the ride midseason to young Frenchman Matthieu Lagrive.

Hill joined Worx Crescent Suzuki as a replacement for the injured Sylvain Guintoli from the Mallory Park round, qualifying 2nd. He was competitive in race 1 despite the electronic engine management system failing before the start, until chaos and controversy struck. He was running second when Josh Brookes lost control of his bike and catapulted race leader Simon Andrews, dropping oil from Brookes' Honda. Hill was one of five other riders who either crashed or downed their bikes to avoid crashing. The red flag was shown, but these seven riders were omitted from the results, as they were not running at the time of the red flag. Brookes received a two-meeting ban for his mistake. Hill kept the ride for the next meeting at Brands Hatch on a three race weekend. Hill rode well at Brands Hatch but after the meeting it was confirmed that Sylvain Guintoli would return to the Worx Suzuki team for the remainder of the season. After missing the Cadwell Park round Hill returned to BSB for the Hydrex Honda team, taking the seat from Karl Harris after he was sacked. Hill adapted quickly to the Hydrex Honda, gaining seventh and sixth-place finishes in his first outing at Croft, two fifths at Silverstone, and podium places at Oulton Park.

For 2010, Hill joined Worx Crescent Suzuki full-time, alongside former World Superbike race winner Yukio Kagayama. He took victory in the season opener at Brands Hatch, before finishing second to James Ellison in race two. He led the championship by 36 points at one stage. Poorer meetings at Cadwell Park and Knockhill eroded his championship lead, but regained it with three podiums at Snetterton. Hill was one of the central subjects of the film I, Superbiker, which recorded his 2010 British Superbike Championship season.

On 10 November 2010, Hill signed to Swan Yamaha full-time, alongside Supersport champion Michael Laverty. He came second in the opening race at Brands Hatch Indy and took victory in the second race. This gave him lead in the championship. At Oulton Park, the weekend after, he got pole position in qualifying and topped the time sheet. However, during the warm-up session, Loris Baz crashed moments before, leaving fluid on the track, this caused Hill to fall and sustain an injury to the left shoulder. Later on, an update said that Hill's injuries would rule him out of the races ahead. However, Hill was back at Croft Circuit in May. He made history at Knockhill Racing Circuit by taking his first double win in the championship and putting him back on top form to fight for the championship title.

== Career statistics ==
Stats correct as of 23 September 2012

=== All Time ===
Series	Years active	Races	Poles	Podiums	Wins	2nd place	3rd place	Fast Laps	Titles
British Superbike Championship	^{2004–05, 2009−}	181	20	52	19	23	10	11	1
Superbike World Championship	^{2006, 2009}	16	1	0	0	0	0	0	0
World Supersport Championship	^{2007–08}	5	0	0	0	0	0	0	0
Total		202	21	52	19	23	10	11	1

=== By championship ===
==== British Superbike Championship ====
Year	Make	1		2		3			4		5		6			7			8			9			10		11		12			13		Pos	Pts	Ref
Year	Make	R1	R2	R1	R2	R1	R2	R3	R1	R2	R1	R2	R1	R2	R3	R1	R2	R3	R1	R2	R3	R1	R2	R3	R1	R2	R1	R2	R1	R2	R3	R1	R2	Pos	Pts	Ref
2004	Yamaha	SIL; 14	SIL; 10	BHI; 9	BHI; 10	SNE; 8	SNE; 10		OUL; 9	OUL; 14	MON; Ret	MON; Ret	THR; 9	THR; 6		BHGP; 7	BHGP; 8		KNO; Ret	KNO; Ret		MAL; Ret	MAL; 6		CRO; 9	CRO; Ret	CAD; 5	CAD; Ret	OUL; 9	OUL; 10		DON; 10	DON; 14	9th	137	
2005	Yamaha	BHI; 10	BHI; 12	THR; 10	THR; Ret	MAL	MAL		OUL	OUL	MON; Ret	MON; 14	CRO; 16	CRO; Ret		KNO; 15	KNO; 12		SNE; 10	SNE; 7		SIL; 8	SIL; 10		CAD; 1	CAD; 4	OUL; 7	OUL; 6	DON; 8	DON; Ret		BHGP; Ret	BHGP; 9	12th	123	
2006	Yamaha	BHI; Ret	BHI; 6	DON; Ret	DON; 6	THR; 8	THR; 9		OUL; 7	OUL; 8	MON; C	MON; C	MAL; 12	MAL; 11		SNE; 6	SNE; 3		KNO; 8	KNO; 4		OUL; Ret	OUL; 6		CRO; 7	CRO; Ret	CAD; 5	CAD; 4	SIL; 6	SIL; Ret		BHGP; 4	BHGP; Ret	8th	187	
2007	Yamaha	BHGP; 9	BHGP; Ret	THR; 8	THR; 10	SIL; 8	SIL; 8		OUL; 10	OUL; 7	SNE; 7	SNE; 7	MON; 10	MON; 9		KNO; 13	KNO; Ret		OUL; 8	OUL; Ret		MAL; 7	MAL; 9		CRO; 10	CRO; Ret	CAD; 6	CAD; 7	DON; Ret	DON; Ret		BHI; Ret	BHI; 13	10th	138	
2009	Suzuki	BHI	BHI	OUL	OUL	DON	DON		THR	THR	SNE	SNE	KNO	KNO		MAL; Ret	MAL; 8		BHGP; 4	BHGP; 5	BHGP; 7	CAD	CAD											11th	127	
2009	Honda																								CRO; 7	CRO; 6	SIL; 5	SIL; 5	OUL; 3	OUL; 4	OUL; 2			11th	127	
2010	Suzuki	BHI; 1	BHI; 2	THR; 1	THR; 2	OUL; 2	OUL; 3		CAD; Ret	CAD; 2	MAL; Ret	MAL; 8	KNO; 8	KNO; C		SNE; 3	SNE; 2	SNE; 2	BHGP; 15	BHGP; 6	BHGP; 4	CAD; 1	CAD; 2		CRO; 1	CRO; 2	SIL; 8	SIL; 5	OUL; 2	OUL; Ret	OUL; 5			3rd	620^{1}	
2011	Yamaha	BHI; 2	BHI; 1	OUL; DNS	OUL; DNS	CRO; 14	CRO; 6		THR; 26	THR; 4	KNO; 1	KNO; 1	SNE; 2	SNE; Ret		OUL; 1	OUL; C		BHGP; 19	BHGP; 2	BHGP; 1	CAD; 2	CAD; 1	CAD; 1	DON; 3	DON; 2	SIL; 3	SIL; 2	BHGP; 4	BHGP; 4	BHGP; 2			1st	647^{1}	
2012	Yamaha	BHI; Ret	BHI; C	THR; 2	THR; 2	OUL; 1	OUL; 4	OUL; 2	SNE; 1	SNE; Ret	KNO; 2	KNO; 3	OUL; 1	OUL; 1	OUL; 1	BHGP; 3	BHGP; 3		CAD; 1	CAD; 1		DON; 2	DON; 3		ASS; Ret	ASS; 4	SIL; 7	SIL; 7	BHGP; 2	BHGP; 6	BHGP; 3			3rd	612^{1}	

===== Notes =====
1. – Hill qualified for "The Showdown" part of the BSB season, thus before the 11th round he was awarded 500 points plus the podium credits he had gained throughout the season. Podium credits are given to anyone finishing 1st, 2nd or 3rd, with 3,2 and 1 points awarded respectively.

==== Superbike World Championship ====
Year	Make	1		2		3		4		5		6		7		8		9		10		11		12		13		14		Pos	Pts	Ref
Year	Make	R1	R2	R1	R2	R1	R2	R1	R2	R1	R2	R1	R2	R1	R2	R1	R2	R1	R2	R1	R2	R1	R2	R1	R2	R1	R2	R1	R2	Pos	Pts	Ref
2006	Yamaha	QAT	QAT	AUS	AUS	ESP	ESP	ITA	ITA	EUR; 12	EUR; 12	SMR	SMR	CZE	CZE	GBR; 11	GBR; Ret	NED	NED	GER	GER	ITA	ITA	FRA	FRA					23rd	13	
2009	Honda	AUS; 14	AUS; 14	QAT; 15	QAT; Ret	SPA; 15	SPA; 22	NED; Ret	NED; Ret	ITA; 20	ITA; 16	RSA; 19	RSA; 17	USA; DNS	USA; DNS	SMR	SMR	GBR	GBR	CZE	CZE	GER	GER	ITA	ITA	FRA	FRA	POR	POR	35th	6	

==== Supersport World Championship ====
Year	Make	1	2	3	4	5	6	7	8	9	10	11	12	13	Pos	Pts	Ref
2007	Yamaha	QAT	AUS	EUR	ESP	NED	ITA	GBR	SMR	CZE	GBR; 5	GER; 5	ITA; Ret	FRA; 5	22nd	33	
2008	Honda	QAT	AUS	ESP	NED	ITA	GER; Ret	SMR	CZE	GBR	EUR	ITA	FRA	POR	NC	0	

=== FIM Endurance World Championship ===
==== By team ====
Year	Team	Bike	Rider	TC
2012	Yamaha Austria Racing Team	Yamaha YZF-R1	(Australia) Steve Martin (Slovenia) Igor Jerman (France) Gwen Giabbani (Japan) Noriyuki Haga (Japan) Katsuyuki Nakasuga (United Kingdom) Tommy Hill	6th
