= 2009 Supersport World Championship =

2009 Supersport World Championship
Previous:	2008	Next:	2010
Support series: Superbike World Championship; FIM Superstock 1000 Cup; European Superstock 600 Championship

The 2009 Supersport World Championship was the eleventh FIM Supersport World Championship season—the thirteenth taking into account the two held under the name of Supersport World Series. The season started on 1 March at Phillip Island and finished on 25 October at Portimão after 14 rounds. The championship supported the Superbike World Championship at every round.

Despite a win at the final round for Eugene Laverty, a fourth-place finish by Cal Crutchlow won him the championship by seven points over the Irish rider.

== Race calendar and results ==
The provisional race schedule was circulated among the teams in October 2008, and was made official by FIM at the following General Assembly.

Round	Country	Circuit	Date	Pole position	Fastest lap	Winning rider	Winning team	Report
1	Australia	Phillip Island Grand Prix Circuit	1 March	(Turkey) Kenan Sofuoğlu	(Australia) Andrew Pitt	(Turkey) Kenan Sofuoğlu	HANNspree Ten Kate Honda	Report
2	Qatar	Losail International Circuit	14 March	(United Kingdom) Cal Crutchlow	(Australia) Andrew Pitt	(Republic of Ireland) Eugene Laverty	Parkalgar Honda	Report
3	Spain	Circuit Ricardo Tormo	5 April	(United Kingdom) Cal Crutchlow	(United Kingdom) Cal Crutchlow	(United Kingdom) Cal Crutchlow	Yamaha World Supersport	Report
4	Netherlands	TT Circuit Assen	26 April	(United Kingdom) Cal Crutchlow	(United Kingdom) Cal Crutchlow	(Republic of Ireland) Eugene Laverty	Parkalgar Honda	Report
5	Italy	Autodromo Nazionale Monza	10 May	(United Kingdom) Cal Crutchlow	(United Kingdom) Cal Crutchlow	(United Kingdom) Cal Crutchlow	Yamaha World Supersport	Report
6	South Africa	Kyalami	17 May	(United Kingdom) Cal Crutchlow	(Republic of Ireland) Eugene Laverty	(Republic of Ireland) Eugene Laverty	Parkalgar Honda	Report
7	United States	Miller Motorsports Park	31 May	(Spain) Joan Lascorz	(Turkey) Kenan Sofuoğlu	(Turkey) Kenan Sofuoğlu	HANNspree Ten Kate Honda	Report
8	San Marino	Misano World Circuit	21 June	(Italy) Michele Pirro	(United Kingdom) Cal Crutchlow	(United Kingdom) Cal Crutchlow	Yamaha World Supersport	Report
9	(United Kingdom) Great Britain	Donington Park	28 June	(United Kingdom) Cal Crutchlow	(United Kingdom) Cal Crutchlow	(United Kingdom) Cal Crutchlow	Yamaha World Supersport	Report
10	Czech Republic	Masaryk Circuit	26 July	(United Kingdom) Cal Crutchlow	(United Kingdom) Cal Crutchlow	(France) Fabien Foret	Yamaha World Supersport	Report
11	Germany	Nürburgring	6 September	(United Kingdom) Cal Crutchlow	(United Kingdom) Cal Crutchlow	(United Kingdom) Cal Crutchlow	Yamaha World Supersport	Report
12	Italy	Autodromo Enzo e Dino Ferrari	27 September	(United Kingdom) Cal Crutchlow	(United Kingdom) Cal Crutchlow	(Turkey) Kenan Sofuoğlu	HANNspree Ten Kate Honda	Report
13	France	Circuit de Nevers Magny-Cours	4 October	(United Kingdom) Cal Crutchlow	(United Kingdom) Cal Crutchlow	(Spain) Joan Lascorz	Kawasaki Motocard.com	Report
14	Portugal	Autódromo Internacional do Algarve	25 October	(Republic of Ireland) Eugene Laverty	(Spain) Joan Lascorz	(Republic of Ireland) Eugene Laverty	Parkalgar Honda	Report

== Championship standings ==
=== Riders' standings ===
2009 final riders' standings
Pos.	Rider	Bike	AUS (Australia)	QAT (Qatar)	SPA (Spain)	NED (Netherlands)	ITA (Italy)	RSA (South Africa)	USA (United States)	SMR (San Marino)	GBR (United Kingdom)	CZE (Czech Republic)	GER (Germany)	ITA (Italy)	FRA (France)	POR (Portugal)	Pts
1	(United Kingdom) Cal Crutchlow	Yamaha	4	**3**	**1**	**2**	**1**	**2**	3	1	**1**	**Ret**	**1**	**Ret**	**2**	4	243
2	(Republic of Ireland) Eugene Laverty	Honda	5	1	9	1	5	1	2	2	5	5	2	2	13	**1**	236
3	(Turkey) Kenan Sofuoğlu	Honda	**1**	4	3	5	9	5	1	Ret	4	9	Ret	1	3	2	189
4	(Spain) Joan Lascorz	Kawasaki	8	13	19	3	2	4	**4**	4	2	3	3	Ret	1	Ret	163
5	(France) Fabien Foret	Yamaha	7	Ret	10	4	3	Ret	5	8	Ret	1	5	3	Ret	8	123
6	(Australia) Andrew Pitt	Honda	2	2	13	Ret	5	6	7	Ret	10	10	7	6	6	11	119
7	(Australia) Anthony West	Honda	3	9	2	7	Ret	8	10	7	Ret	2	15	8	4		117
8	(Australia) Garry McCoy	Triumph	14	7	Ret	15	8	7	6	Ret	3	8	8	5	Ret	3	98
9	(Australia) Mark Aitchison	Honda	6	15	4	6	Ret	3	Ret	5	Ret	Ret	6	Ret	5	5	93
10	(Japan) Katsuaki Fujiwara	Kawasaki	17	Ret	5	14	6	13	13	6	Ret	4	Ret	Ret	7	13	73
11	(Italy) Massimo Roccoli	Honda	9	8	14	13	Ret	12	23	3	Ret	7	4	Ret	8	Ret	70
12	(Italy) Michele Pirro	Yamaha	12	11	7	10	7	9	8	**Ret**	15	Ret	Ret	11	10	6	70
13	(Netherlands) Barry Veneman	Suzuki	13	10	8	8	13	Ret	14								58
13	(Netherlands) Barry Veneman	Honda								Ret	6	11	12	14	Ret	9	58
14	(France) Matthieu Lagrive	Honda	11	6	6	Ret	16	10	9						9		45
15	(Portugal) Miguel Praia	Honda	Ret	12	18	Ret	17	14	11	10	Ret	Ret	11	9	12	10	40
16	(Italy) Gianluca Nannelli	Triumph	10	19	Ret	12	10	Ret	16	9	8	Ret	Ret				31
17	(Denmark) Robbin Harms	Honda	15	5	12	9	WD		Ret	Ret	Ret	Ret	9	DNS			30
18	(Italy) Gianluca Vizziello	Honda	Ret	14	11	Ret	14	17	15	11	7	14	13				29
19	(Italy) Danilo Dell'Omo	Honda	21	16	Ret	18	19	15		13	9	12	10	10	NC	17	27
20	(United Kingdom) Chaz Davies	Triumph												4	Ret	7	22
21	(South Africa) Sheridan Morais	Yamaha										6					10
22	(Republic of Ireland) Michael Laverty	Honda						11		Ret	20	13	18	Ret	Ret	14	10
22	(Republic of Ireland) Michael Laverty	Yamaha							17								10
23	(Czech Republic) Patrik Vostárek	Honda	18	Ret	16	11	WD	DNS	Ret	Ret	12	Ret					9
24	(France) Olivier Four	Honda												13	11	20	8
25	(Indonesia) Doni Tata Pradita	Yamaha	Ret	20	15	Ret	17	14	11	Ret			Ret	Ret	Ret	16	8
26	(United Kingdom) Kev Coghlan	Yamaha								Ret	13		20		14	15	6
27	(United Kingdom) James Westmoreland	Triumph									11						5
28	(Italy) Franco Battaini	Yamaha					11										5
29	(Italy) Flavio Gentile	Honda								12	17			15		17	5
30	(Colombia) Martín Cárdenas	Honda														12	4
31	(Italy) Cristiano Migliorati	Kawasaki												12			4
32	(Netherlands) Arie Vos	Honda	22	17	17	16	20	19	18	14	16	17	21	16	15	Ret	3
33	(Germany) Kevin Wahr	Triumph											14				2
34	(South Africa) Hudson Kennaugh	Yamaha									14						2
35	(Germany) Jesco Günther	Honda	20	Ret	Ret	Ret	18	Ret	19	Ret	Ret	15	19	DNS	Ret		1
36	(Spain) Yannick Guerra	Yamaha	25	21	20	22	Ret	22	22	15	19	19	22	DNQ	NC	18	1
37	(Italy) Alessandro Polita	Suzuki				Ret	15	Ret	20								1
	(Czech Republic) Matej Smrž	Triumph	16	Ret	Ret	Ret	DNS			Ret	18	Ret	17				0
	(Romania) Robert Mureșan	Triumph								16	Ret	16	Ret	Ret	DNS	21	0
	(United Kingdom) Sam Lowes	Honda										18	16	Ret	Ret	Ret	0
	(France) Julien Enjolras	Triumph													16		0
	(Netherlands) Russell Holland	Honda	19	18	Ret	17	Ret	18	21								0
	(Italy) Emanuele Russo	Yamaha												17			0
	(Netherlands) Kervin Bos	Yamaha				19											0
	(Netherlands) Marcel van Nieuwenhuizen	Honda				20											0
	(Italy) Fabrizio Lai	Honda	24	22	21	21	21	20									0
	(Czech Republic) Jiří Brož	Honda										20					0
	(South Africa) Robert Portman	Kawasaki						21									0
	(Spain) José Morillas	Yamaha	Ret	Ret			22	DNS									0
	(Poland) Marcin Walkowiak	Yamaha														22	0
	(Australia) Shaun Geronimi	Suzuki	23	23	Ret												0
	(Netherlands) Twan Van Poppel	Yamaha				23											0
	(Russia) Oleg Pianykh	Yamaha							24								0
	(Canada) Andrew Nelson	Yamaha							25								0
	(United States) Chip Yates	Suzuki							26								0
	(United Kingdom) Dan Linfoot	Yamaha													NC		0
	(Poland) Paweł Szkopek	Triumph	Ret	Ret													0
	(United States) Melissa Paris	Yamaha							Ret								0
	(Italy) Alessandro Brannetti	Yamaha								Ret							0
	(Australia) Jason O'Halloran	Honda										Ret					0
	(Italy) Luca Pedersoli	Triumph												Ret			0
	(France) Fabrice Auger	Yamaha													Ret		0
	(Italy) Fabrizio Perotti	Honda							DNS								
	(Canada) Marie-Josée Boucher	Honda							DNQ								
	(Canada) Ryan Taylor	Honda							DNQ								
	(United Kingdom) Glenn Irwin	Honda												DNQ			
Pos.	Rider	Bike	AUS (Australia)	QAT (Qatar)	SPA (Spain)	NED (Netherlands)	ITA (Italy)	RSA (South Africa)	USA (United States)	SMR (San Marino)	GBR (United Kingdom)	CZE (Czech Republic)	GER (Germany)	ITA (Italy)	FRA (France)	POR (Portugal)	Pts

Colour	Result
Gold	Winner
Silver	Second place
Bronze	Third place
Green	Points classification
Blue	Non-points classification
Blue	Non-classified finish (NC)
Purple	Retired, not classified (Ret)
Red	Did not qualify (DNQ)
Red	Did not pre-qualify (DNPQ)
Black	Disqualified (DSQ)
White	Did not start (DNS)
White	Withdrew (WD)
White	Race cancelled (C)
Blank	Did not practice (DNP)
Blank	Did not arrive (DNA)
Blank	Excluded (EX)

Bold – Pole position
Italics – Fastest lap

=== Manufacturers' standings ===
2009 final manufacturers' standings
Pos.	Manufacturer	AUS (Australia)	QAT (Qatar)	SPA (Spain)	NED (Netherlands)	ITA (Italy)	RSA (South Africa)	USA (United States)	SMR (San Marino)	GBR (United Kingdom)	CZE (Czech Republic)	GER (Germany)	ITA (Italy)	FRA (France)	POR (Portugal)	Pts
1	(Japan) Honda	1	1	2	1	4	1	1	2	4	2	2	1	3	1	297
2	(Japan) Yamaha	4	3	1	2	1	2	3	1	1	1	1	3	2	4	284
3	(Japan) Kawasaki	8	13	5	3	2	4	4	4	2	3	3	7	1	13	186
4	(United Kingdom) Triumph	10	7	Ret	12	8	7	6	9	3	8	8	4	16	3	114
5	(Japan) Suzuki	13	10	8	8	13	Ret	14								30
Pos.	Manufacturer	AUS (Australia)	QAT (Qatar)	SPA (Spain)	NED (Netherlands)	ITA (Italy)	RSA (South Africa)	USA (United States)	SMR (San Marino)	GBR (United Kingdom)	CZE (Czech Republic)	GER (Germany)	ITA (Italy)	FRA (France)	POR (Portugal)	Pts

== Entry list ==
The entry list was made official on 15 January 2009.

Team	Constructor	Motorcycle	No	Rider	Rounds
HANNspree Ten Kate Honda	Honda	Honda CBR600RR	1	(Australia) Andrew Pitt	All
HANNspree Ten Kate Honda	Honda	Honda CBR600RR	54	(Turkey) Kenan Sofuoğlu	All
JW Racing	Triumph	Triumph Daytona 675	4	(United Kingdom) James Westmoreland	9
YZF Yamaha	Yamaha	Yamaha YZF-R6	5	(Indonesia) Doni Tata Pradita	1–8, 11–14
YZF Yamaha	Yamaha	Yamaha YZF-R6	132	(South Africa) Sheridan Morais	10
Linxcel-Seton Tuning	Yamaha	Yamaha YZF-R6	6	(South Africa) Hudson Kennaugh	9
Intermoto Czech	Honda	Honda CBR600RR	7	(Czech Republic) Patrik Vostárek	1–10
Intermoto Czech	Honda	Honda CBR600RR	55	(Italy) Massimo Roccoli	All
Intermoto Czech	Honda	Honda CBR600RR	66	(Czech Republic) Jiří Brož	10
Intermoto Czech	Honda	Honda CBR600RR	199	(France) Olivier Four	12–14
HANNspree Honda Althea; Honda Althea Racing	Honda	Honda CBR600RR	8	(Australia) Mark Aitchison	All
HANNspree Honda Althea; Honda Althea Racing	Honda	Honda CBR600RR	14	(France) Matthieu Lagrive	1–7, 13
HANNspree Honda Althea; Honda Althea Racing	Honda	Honda CBR600RR	15	(Australia) Jason O'Halloran	10
HANNspree Honda Althea; Honda Althea Racing	Honda	Honda CBR600RR	40	(Italy) Flavio Gentile	8–9, 12, 14
Kuja Racing	Honda	Honda CBR600RR	9	(Italy) Danilo Dell'Omo	1–6, 8–14
Echo CRS Grand Prix	Honda	Honda CBR600RR	11	(Italy) Fabrizio Perotti	7
Echo CRS Grand Prix	Honda	Honda CBR600RR	16	(United Kingdom) Sam Lowes	10–14
Echo CRS Grand Prix	Honda	Honda CBR600RR	25	(United Kingdom) Michael Laverty	8–14
Echo CRS Grand Prix	Honda	Honda CBR600RR	32	(Italy) Fabrizio Lai	1–6
Echo CRS Grand Prix	Honda	Honda CBR600RR	83	(Australia) Russell Holland	1–7
TNT Racing	Yamaha	Yamaha YZF-R6	12	(Italy) Franco Battaini	5
Stiggy Racing Honda	Honda	Honda CBR600RR	13	(Australia) Anthony West	1–13
Stiggy Racing Honda	Honda	Honda CBR600RR	105	(Italy) Gianluca Vizziello	1–11
MS Racing	Triumph	Triumph Daytona 675	19	(Poland) Paweł Szkopek	1–2
MS Racing	Triumph	Triumph Daytona 675	22	(Romania) Robert Mureșan	12–14
MS Racing	Triumph	Triumph Daytona 675	96	(Czech Republic) Matej Smrž	1–5, 8–11
Kawasaki Motocard.com	Kawasaki	Kawasaki ZX-6R	21	(Japan) Katsuaki Fujiwara	All
Kawasaki Motocard.com	Kawasaki	Kawasaki ZX-6R	26	(Spain) Joan Lascorz	All
MS Romania Racing	Triumph	Triumph Daytona 675	22	(Romania) Robert Mureșan	8–11
ParkinGO Triumph BE1	Triumph	Triumph Daytona 675	23	(United Kingdom) Chaz Davies	12–14
ParkinGO Triumph BE1	Triumph	Triumph Daytona 675	24	(Australia) Garry McCoy	All
ParkinGO Triumph BE1	Triumph	Triumph Daytona 675	47	(Italy) Luca Pedersoli	12
ParkinGO Triumph BE1	Triumph	Triumph Daytona 675	69	(Italy) Gianluca Nannelli	1–11
ParkinGO Triumph BE1	Triumph	Triumph Daytona 675	82	(France) Julien Enjolras	13
Veidec Racing RES Software	Honda	Honda CBR600RR	25	(United Kingdom) Michael Laverty	6
Veidec Racing RES Software	Honda	Honda CBR600RR	28	(Netherlands) Arie Vos	All
Veidec Racing RES Software	Honda	Honda CBR600RR	36	(Colombia) Martín Cárdenas	14
Veidec Racing RES Software	Honda	Honda CBR600RR	127	(Denmark) Robbin Harms	1–4, 7–12
Holiday Gym Racing	Yamaha	Yamaha YZF-R6	25	(United Kingdom) Michael Laverty	7
Holiday Gym Racing	Yamaha	Yamaha YZF-R6	27	(Netherlands) Twan van Poppel	4
Holiday Gym Racing	Yamaha	Yamaha YZF-R6	34	(Italy) Emanuele Russo	12
Holiday Gym Racing	Yamaha	Yamaha YZF-R6	71	(Spain) José Morillas	1–2, 5–6
Holiday Gym Racing	Yamaha	Yamaha YZF-R6	88	(Spain) Yannick Guerra	All
Holiday Gym Racing	Yamaha	Yamaha YZF-R6	101	(United Kingdom) Kev Coghlan	8–9, 11, 13–14
Markbilt Racebikes	Yamaha	Yamaha YZF-R6	29	(United States) Melissa Paris	7
RES Software Veidec Racing	Honda	Honda CBR600RR	30	(Germany) Jesco Günther	1–13
Puccetti Racing	Kawasaki	Kawasaki ZX-6R	33	(Italy) Cristiano Migliorati	12
Yamaha World Supersport Team	Yamaha	Yamaha YZF-R6	35	(United Kingdom) Cal Crutchlow	All
Yamaha World Supersport Team	Yamaha	Yamaha YZF-R6	99	(France) Fabien Foret	All
Boucher Racing Team	Honda	Honda CBR600RR	38	(Canada) Marie-Josée Boucher	7
WCR Byke Service	Yamaha	Yamaha YZF-R6	44	(Italy) Alessandro Brannetti	8
Node 4 Yamaha	Yamaha	Yamaha YZF-R6	45	(United Kingdom) Dan Linfoot	13
Parkalgar Honda	Honda	Honda CBR600RR	50	(Republic of Ireland) Eugene Laverty	All
Parkalgar Honda	Honda	Honda CBR600RR	117	(Portugal) Miguel Praia	All
Yamaha Lorenzini by Leoni	Yamaha	Yamaha YZF-R6	51	(Italy) Michele Pirro	All
Hoegee Suzuki Team	Suzuki	Suzuki GSX-R600	53	(Italy) Alessandro Polita	4–7
Hoegee Suzuki Team	Suzuki	Suzuki GSX-R600	77	(Netherlands) Barry Veneman	1–7
Hoegee Suzuki Team	Suzuki	Suzuki GSX-R600	78	(Australia) Shaun Geronimi	1–3
VD Sleen/VD Heyden	Yamaha	Yamaha YZF-R6	57	(Netherlands) Kervin Bos	4
Marne Motor Sport	Yamaha	Yamaha YZF-R6	61	(France) Fabrice Auger	13
Direct CCTV Racedays	Honda	Honda CBR600RR	74	(United Kingdom) Glenn Irwin	12
Apex Racing	Yamaha	Yamaha YZF-R6	75	(Russia) Oleg Pianykh	7
Bazza Racing	Honda	Honda CBR600RR	77	(Netherlands) Barry Veneman	8
George White Ten Kate Racing	Honda	Honda CBR600RR	77	(Netherlands) Barry Veneman	9–14
EmTek Racing Kawasaki	Kawasaki	Kawasaki ZX-6R	86	(South Africa) Robert Portman	6
SWIGZ.COM Pro Racing	Suzuki	Suzuki GSX-R600	89	(United States) Chip Yates	7
G-LAB Racing Sport Evolution	Triumph	Triumph Daytona 675	91	(Germany) Kevin Wahr	11
Sterken Racing	Honda	Honda CBR600RR	94	(Netherlands) Marcel van Nieuwenhuizen	4
Taylor Racing	Honda	Honda CBR600RR	111	(Canada) Ryan Taylor	7
LW Bogdanka Racing Team	Yamaha	Yamaha YZF-R6	122	(Poland) Marcin Walkowiak	14
Nelson Racing	Yamaha	Yamaha YZF-R6	126	(Canada) Andrew Nelson	7

- All entries used Pirelli tyres.
