= 2009 Kyalami Superbike World Championship round =

Superbike race in South Africa

(South Africa) 2009 Kyalami Superbike World Championship round
Round details
- Round 6 of 14 rounds in the 2009 Superbike World Championship. and Round 6 of 14 rounds in the 2009 Supersport World Championship.
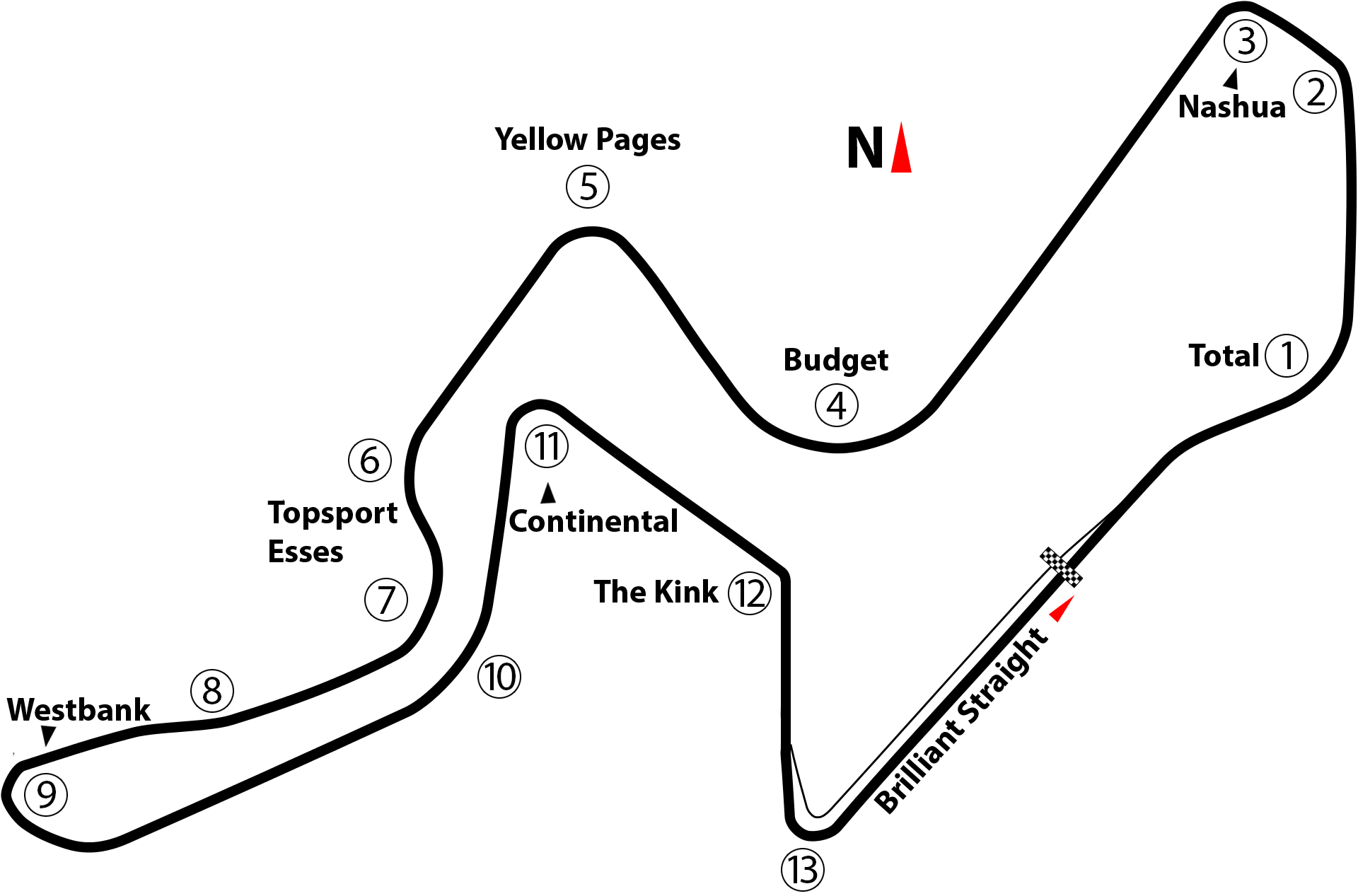
- Date: 17 May, 2009
- Location: Kyalami
- Course: Permanent racing facility 4.246 km (2.638 mi)

Superbike World Championship
Pole position
(United States) Ben Spies
1:37.288
| Fastest lap race 1 | Fastest lap race 2 |
| (Italy) Michel Fabrizio | (Japan) Noriyuki Haga |
| 1:38.548 | 1:38.577 |

Supersport World Championship
Pole position
(United Kingdom) Cal Crutchlow
1:40.634
Fastest lap
(Republic of Ireland) Eugene Laverty
1:41.053

The 2009 Kyalami Superbike World Championship round was the sixth round of the 2009 Superbike World Championship season. It took place on the weekend of 15–17 May 2009 at Kyalami, South Africa.

== Results ==
=== Superbike race 1 ===
| Pos | No | Rider | Bike | Laps | Time | Grid | Points |
|---|---|---|---|---|---|---|---|
| 1 | 41 | (Japan) Noriyuki Haga | Ducati 1098R | 24 | 39:47.436 | 4 | 25 |
| 2 | 84 | (Italy) Michel Fabrizio | Ducati 1098R | 24 | +0.950 | 2 | 20 |
| 3 | 19 | (United States) Ben Spies | Yamaha YZF-R1 | 24 | +3.391 | 1 | 16 |
| 4 | 65 | (United Kingdom) Jonathan Rea | Honda CBR1000RR | 24 | +8.914 | 5 | 13 |
| 5 | 3 | (Italy) Max Biaggi | Aprilia RSV 4 | 24 | +9.019 | 3 | 11 |
| 6 | 7 | (Spain) Carlos Checa | Honda CBR1000RR | 24 | +14.812 | 7 | 10 |
| 7 | 56 | (Japan) Shinya Nakano | Aprilia RSV 4 | 24 | +14.971 | 9 | 9 |
| 8 | 71 | (Japan) Yukio Kagayama | Suzuki GSX-R1000 K9 | 24 | +15.723 | 13 | 8 |
| 9 | 67 | (United Kingdom) Shane Byrne | Ducati 1098R | 24 | +21.529 | 14 | 7 |
| 10 | 66 | (United Kingdom) Tom Sykes | Yamaha YZF-R1 | 24 | +21.795 | 8 | 6 |
| 11 | 36 | (Spain) Gregorio Lavilla | Ducati 1098R | 24 | +29.872 | 16 | 5 |
| 12 | 9 | (Japan) Ryuichi Kiyonari | Honda CBR1000RR | 24 | +34.216 | 12 | 4 |
| 13 | 132 | (South Africa) Sheridan Morais | Kawasaki ZX-10R | 24 | +34.275 | 11 | 3 |
| 14 | 96 | (Czech Republic) Jakub Smrž | Ducati 1098R | 24 | +38.280 | 6 | 2 |
| 15 | 23 | (Australia) Broc Parkes | Kawasaki ZX-10R | 24 | +40.885 | 17 | 1 |
| 16 | 10 | (Spain) Fonsi Nieto | Suzuki GSX-R1000 K9 | 24 | +44.841 | 21 | |
| 17 | 99 | (Italy) Luca Scassa | Kawasaki ZX-10R | 24 | +49.075 | 18 | |
| 18 | 31 | (Australia) Karl Muggeridge | Suzuki GSX-R1000 K9 | 24 | +49.702 | 22 | |
| 19 | 33 | (United Kingdom) Tommy Hill | Honda CBR1000RR | 24 | +50.065 | 20 | |
| 20 | 25 | (Spain) David Salom | Kawasaki ZX-10R | 24 | +50.391 | 19 | |
| 21 | 49 | (South Africa) Shaun Whyte | Yamaha YZF-R1 | 23 | +1 Lap | 24 | |
| 22 | 17 | (Australia) Steve Martin | BMW S1000RR | 22 | +2 Laps | 23 | |
| Ret | 91 | (United Kingdom) Leon Haslam | Honda CBR1000RR | 14 | Accident | 10 | |
| Ret | 111 | (Spain) Ruben Xaus | BMW S1000RR | 1 | Accident | 15 | |

=== Superbike race 2 ===
| Pos | No | Rider | Bike | Laps | Time | Grid | Points |
|---|---|---|---|---|---|---|---|
| 1 | 41 | (Japan) Noriyuki Haga | Ducati 1098R | 24 | 39:45.027 | 4 | 25 |
| 2 | 84 | (Italy) Michel Fabrizio | Ducati 1098R | 24 | +0.322 | 2 | 20 |
| 3 | 65 | (United Kingdom) Jonathan Rea | Honda CBR1000RR | 24 | +8.936 | 5 | 16 |
| 4 | 91 | (United Kingdom) Leon Haslam | Honda CBR1000RR | 24 | +10.561 | 10 | 13 |
| 5 | 3 | (Italy) Max Biaggi | Aprilia RSV 4 | 24 | +10.767 | 3 | 11 |
| 6 | 7 | (Spain) Carlos Checa | Honda CBR1000RR | 24 | +12.413 | 7 | 10 |
| 7 | 56 | (Japan) Shinya Nakano | Aprilia RSV 4 | 24 | +12.616 | 9 | 9 |
| 8 | 71 | (Japan) Yukio Kagayama | Suzuki GSX-R1000 K9 | 24 | +14.878 | 13 | 8 |
| 9 | 66 | (United Kingdom) Tom Sykes | Yamaha YZF-R1 | 24 | +16.225 | 8 | 7 |
| 10 | 96 | (Czech Republic) Jakub Smrž | Ducati 1098R | 24 | +18.197 | 6 | 6 |
| 11 | 132 | (South Africa) Sheridan Morais | Kawasaki ZX-10R | 24 | +20.629 | 11 | 5 |
| 12 | 36 | (Spain) Gregorio Lavilla | Ducati 1098R | 24 | +24.320 | 16 | 4 |
| 13 | 9 | (Japan) Ryuichi Kiyonari | Honda CBR1000RR | 24 | +24.564 | 12 | 3 |
| 14 | 23 | (Australia) Broc Parkes | Kawasaki ZX-10R | 24 | +38.747 | 17 | 2 |
| 15 | 10 | (Spain) Fonsi Nieto | Suzuki GSX-R1000 K9 | 24 | +50.045 | 21 | 1 |
| 16 | 25 | (Spain) David Salom | Kawasaki ZX-10R | 24 | +57.999 | 19 | |
| 17 | 33 | (United Kingdom) Tommy Hill | Honda CBR1000RR | 24 | +1:05.973 | 20 | |
| 18 | 17 | (Australia) Steve Martin | BMW S1000RR | 24 | +1:28.685 | 23 | |
| 19 | 49 | (South Africa) Shaun Whyte | Yamaha YZF-R1 | 23 | +1 Lap | 24 | |
| Ret | 99 | (Italy) Luca Scassa | Kawasaki ZX-10R | 14 | Retirement | 18 | |
| Ret | 67 | (United Kingdom) Shane Byrne | Ducati 1098R | 7 | Mechanical | 14 | |
| Ret | 19 | (United States) Ben Spies | Yamaha YZF-R1 | 2 | Mechanical | 1 | |
| Ret | 111 | (Spain) Ruben Xaus | BMW S1000RR | 2 | Accident | 15 | |
| Ret | 31 | (Australia) Karl Muggeridge | Suzuki GSX-R1000 K9 | 1 | Accident | 22 | |

=== Supersport race ===
| Pos | No | Rider | Bike | Laps | Time | Grid | Points |
|---|---|---|---|---|---|---|---|
| 1 | 50 | (Republic of Ireland) Eugene Laverty | Honda CBR600RR | 23 | 39:06.061 | 3 | 25 |
| 2 | 35 | (United Kingdom) Cal Crutchlow | Yamaha YZF-R6 | 23 | +2.546 | 1 | 20 |
| 3 | 8 | (Australia) Mark Aitchison | Honda CBR600RR | 23 | +17.358 | 8 | 16 |
| 4 | 26 | (Spain) Joan Lascorz | Kawasaki ZX-6R | 23 | +17.454 | 5 | 13 |
| 5 | 54 | (Turkey) Kenan Sofuoğlu | Honda CBR600RR | 23 | +18.221 | 2 | 11 |
| 6 | 1 | (Australia) Andrew Pitt | Honda CBR600RR | 23 | +20.561 | 4 | 10 |
| 7 | 24 | (Australia) Garry McCoy | Triumph Daytona 675 | 23 | +33.141 | 12 | 9 |
| 8 | 13 | (Australia) Anthony West | Honda CBR600RR | 23 | +37.326 | 16 | 8 |
| 9 | 51 | (Italy) Michele Pirro | Yamaha YZF-R6 | 23 | +37.728 | 6 | 7 |
| 10 | 14 | (France) Matthieu Lagrive | Honda CBR600RR | 23 | +37.939 | 13 | 6 |
| 11 | 25 | (Republic of Ireland) Michael Laverty | Honda CBR600RR | 23 | +38.782 | 19 | 5 |
| 12 | 55 | (Italy) Massimo Roccoli | Honda CBR600RR | 23 | +39.198 | 11 | 4 |
| 13 | 21 | (Japan) Katsuaki Fujiwara | Kawasaki ZX-6R | 23 | +40.386 | 10 | 3 |
| 14 | 5 | (Indonesia) Doni Tata Pradita | Yamaha YZF-R6 | 23 | +46.386 | 14 | 2 |
| 15 | 9 | (Italy) Danilo dell'Omo | Honda CBR600RR | 23 | +46.794 | 15 | 1 |
| 16 | 117 | (Portugal) Miguel Praia | Honda CBR600RR | 23 | +53.911 | 17 | |
| 17 | 105 | (Italy) Gianluca Vizziello | Honda CBR600RR | 23 | +1:01.698 | 20 | |
| 18 | 83 | (Australia) Russell Holland | Honda CBR600RR | 23 | +1:11.042 | 18 | |
| 19 | 28 | (Netherlands) Arie Vos | Honda CBR600RR | 23 | +1:11.420 | 23 | |
| 20 | 32 | (Italy) Fabrizio Lai | Honda CBR600RR | 23 | +1:22.793 | 25 | |
| 21 | 86 | (South Africa) Robert Portman | Kawasaki ZX-6R | 23 | +1:24.191 | 24 | |
| 22 | 88 | (Spain) Yannick Guerra | Yamaha YZF-R6 | 23 | +1:24.481 | 28 | |
| Ret | 69 | (Italy) Gianluca Nannelli | Triumph Daytona 675 | 19 | Retirement | 9 | |
| Ret | 99 | (France) Fabien Foret | Yamaha YZF-R6 | 18 | Accident | 7 | |
| Ret | 53 | (Italy) Alex Polita | Suzuki GSX-R600 | 11 | Retirement | 22 | |
| Ret | 30 | (Germany) Jesco Günther | Honda CBR600RR | 6 | Retirement | 27 | |
| Ret | 77 | (Netherlands) Barry Veneman | Suzuki GSX-R600 | 4 | Mechanical | 21 | |
