= 2009 Phillip Island Superbike World Championship round =

Motorcycle race meeting

(Australia) 2009 Phillip Island Superbike World Championship round
Round details
- Round 1 of 14 rounds in the 2009 Superbike World Championship. and Round 1 of 14 rounds in the 2009 Supersport World Championship.
- Date: 1 March, 2009
- Location: Phillip Island
- Course: Permanent racing facility 4.445 km (2.762 mi)

Superbike World Championship
Pole position
(United States) Ben Spies
1:31.069
Fastest lap race 1	Fastest lap race 2
(Australia) Troy Corser	(Japan) Noriyuki Haga
1:32.726	1:32.406

Supersport World Championship
Pole position
(Turkey) Kenan Sofuoğlu
1:34.320
Fastest lap
(Australia) Andrew Pitt
1:35.327

The 2009 Phillip Island Superbike World Championship round was the first round of the 2009 Superbike World Championship. It took place over the weekend of 27 February–1 March 2009, at the Phillip Island Grand Prix Circuit near Cowes, Victoria, Australia.

== Results ==
=== Superbike race 1 ===
Pos	No	Rider	Bike	Laps	Time	Grid	Points
1	41	(Japan) Noriyuki Haga	Ducati 1098R	22	34:22.631	13	25
2	76	(Germany) Max Neukirchner	Suzuki GSX-R1000 K9	22	+0.032	14	20
3	71	(Japan) Yukio Kagayama	Suzuki GSX-R1000 K9	22	+5.347	11	16
4	84	(Italy) Michel Fabrizio	Ducati 1098R	22	+6.587	5	13
5	65	(United Kingdom) Jonathan Rea	Honda CBR1000RR	22	+8.491	3	11
6	91	(United Kingdom) Leon Haslam	Honda CBR1000RR	22	+8.523	6	10
7	55	(France) Régis Laconi	Ducati 1098 RS 09	22	+8.766	8	9
8	11	(Australia) Troy Corser	BMW S1000RR	22	+11.589	17	8
9	96	(Czech Republic) Jakub Smrž	Ducati 1098R	22	+11.721	4	7
10	66	(United Kingdom) Tom Sykes	Yamaha YZF-R1	22	+11.761	12	6
11	3	(Italy) Max Biaggi	Aprilia RSV 4	22	+12.609	2	5
12	7	(Spain) Carlos Checa	Honda CBR1000RR	22	+19.096	7	4
13	44	(Italy) Roberto Rolfo	Honda CBR1000RR	22	+24.149	18	3
14	33	(United Kingdom) Tommy Hill	Honda CBR1000RR	22	+27.416	20	2
15	56	(Japan) Shinya Nakano	Aprilia RSV 4	22	+28.173	9	1
16	19	(United States) Ben Spies	Yamaha YZF-R1	22	+28.235	1	
17	24	(Australia) Brendan Roberts	Ducati 1098R	22	+37.348	21	
18	100	(Japan) Makoto Tamada	Kawasaki ZX-10R	22	+37.401	22	
19	111	(Spain) Rubén Xaus	BMW S1000RR	22	+42.614	19	
20	99	(Italy) Luca Scassa	Kawasaki ZX-10R	22	+1:03.794	26	
21	25	(Spain) David Salom	Kawasaki ZX-10R	20	+2 Laps	24	
Ret	15	(Italy) Matteo Baiocco	Kawasaki ZX-10R	14	Mechanical	28	
Ret	23	(Australia) Broc Parkes	Kawasaki ZX-10R	8	Mechanical	16	
Ret	77	(Italy) Vittorio Iannuzzo	Honda CBR1000RR	8	Mechanical	27	
Ret	67	(United Kingdom) Shane Byrne	Ducati 1098R	7	Accident	15	
Ret	31	(Australia) Karl Muggeridge	Suzuki GSX-R1000 K9	4	Mechanical	25	
Ret	9	(Japan) Ryuichi Kiyonari	Honda CBR1000RR	0	Accident	10	
DNS	86	(Italy) Ayrton Badovini	Kawasaki ZX-10R			23	

=== Superbike race 2 ===
Pos	No	Rider	Bike	Laps	Time	Grid	Points
1	19	(United States) Ben Spies	Yamaha YZF-R1	22	34:20.457	1	25
2	41	(Japan) Noriyuki Haga	Ducati 1098R	22	+1.286	13	20
3	91	(United Kingdom) Leon Haslam	Honda CBR1000RR	22	+4.213	6	16
4	55	(France) Régis Laconi	Ducati 1098 RS 09	22	+4.490	8	13
5	84	(Italy) Michel Fabrizio	Ducati 1098R	22	+6.045	5	11
6	76	(Germany) Max Neukirchner	Suzuki GSX-R1000 K9	22	+9.947	14	10
7	96	(Czech Republic) Jakub Smrž	Ducati 1098R	22	+10.174	4	9
8	71	(Japan) Yukio Kagayama	Suzuki GSX-R1000 K9	22	+12.100	11	8
9	65	(United Kingdom) Jonathan Rea	Honda CBR1000RR	22	+12.742	3	7
10	66	(United Kingdom) Tom Sykes	Yamaha YZF-R1	22	+20.061	12	6
11	111	(Spain) Rubén Xaus	BMW S1000RR	22	+24.854	19	5
12	56	(Japan) Shinya Nakano	Aprilia RSV 4	22	+25.192	9	4
13	7	(Spain) Carlos Checa	Honda CBR1000RR	22	+27.162	7	3
14	33	(United Kingdom) Tommy Hill	Honda CBR1000RR	22	+29.737	20	2
15	3	(Italy) Max Biaggi	Aprilia RSV 4	22	+30.026	2	1
16	44	(Italy) Roberto Rolfo	Honda CBR1000RR	22	+38.458	18	
17	100	(Japan) Makoto Tamada	Kawasaki ZX-10R	22	+44.453	22	
18	23	(Australia) Broc Parkes	Kawasaki ZX-10R	22	+45.486	16	
19	24	(Australia) Brendan Roberts	Ducati 1098R	22	+46.198	21	
20	99	(Italy) Luca Scassa	Kawasaki ZX-10R	22	+57.921	26	
21	31	(Australia) Karl Muggeridge	Suzuki GSX-R1000 K9	22	+57.989	25	
22	11	(Australia) Troy Corser	BMW S1000RR	22	+1:00.093	17	
23	9	(Japan) Ryuichi Kiyonari	Honda CBR1000RR	22	+1:07.820	10	
24	15	(Italy) Matteo Baiocco	Kawasaki ZX-10R	22	+1:21.224	28	
25	25	(Spain) David Salom	Kawasaki ZX-10R	22	+1:21.276	24	
Ret	67	(United Kingdom) Shane Byrne	Ducati 1098R	11	Accident	15	
Ret	77	(Italy) Vittorio Iannuzzo	Honda CBR1000RR	7	Mechanical	27	
DNS	86	(Italy) Ayrton Badovini	Kawasaki ZX-10R			23	

=== Supersport race ===
Pos	No	Rider	Bike	Laps	Time	Grid	Points
1	54	(Turkey) Kenan Sofuoğlu	Honda CBR600RR	21	33:42.156	1	25
2	1	(Australia) Andrew Pitt	Honda CBR600RR	21	+0.060	14	20
3	13	(Australia) Anthony West	Honda CBR600RR	21	+0.153	12	16
4	35	(United Kingdom) Cal Crutchlow	Yamaha YZF-R6	21	+1.097	4	13
5	50	(Republic of Ireland) Eugene Laverty	Honda CBR600RR	21	+1.098	5	11
6	8	(Australia) Mark Aitchison	Honda CBR600RR	21	+3.631	9	10
7	99	(France) Fabien Foret	Yamaha YZF-R6	21	+5.023	6	9
8	26	(Spain) Joan Lascorz	Kawasaki ZX-6R	21	+9.540	2	8
9	55	(Italy) Massimo Roccoli	Honda CBR600RR	21	+14.099	18	7
10	69	(Italy) Gianluca Nannelli	Triumph Daytona 675	21	+14.202	13	6
11	14	(France) Matthieu Lagrive	Honda CBR600RR	21	+15.110	15	5
12	51	(Italy) Michele Pirro	Yamaha YZF-R6	21	+15.204	7	4
13	77	(Netherlands) Barry Veneman	Suzuki GSX-R600	21	+15.263	10	3
14	24	(Australia) Garry McCoy	Triumph Daytona 675	21	+26.607	8	2
15	127	(Denmark) Robbin Harms	Honda CBR600RR	21	+29.707	11	1
16	96	(Czech Republic) Matěj Smrž	Triumph Daytona 675	21	+29.876	20	
17	21	(Japan) Katsuaki Fujiwara	Kawasaki ZX-6R	21	+30.157	16	
18	7	(Czech Republic) Patrik Vostárek	Honda CBR600RR	21	+36.918	23	
19	83	(Australia) Russell Holland	Honda CBR600RR	21	+42.324	21	
20	30	(Germany) Jesco Günther	Honda CBR600RR	21	+45.388	25	
21	9	(Italy) Danilo Dell'Omo	Honda CBR600RR	21	+1:01.742	24	
22	28	(Netherlands) Arie Vos	Honda CBR600RR	21	+1:02.450	26	
23	78	(Australia) Shaun Geronimi	Suzuki GSX-R600	21	+1:09.795	28	
24	32	(Italy) Fabrizio Lai	Honda CBR600RR	21	+1:09.839	27	
25	88	(Spain) Yannick Guerra	Yamaha YZF-R6	21	+1:19.097	30	
Ret	71	(Spain) José Morillas	Yamaha YZF-R6	15	Mechanical	29	
Ret	105	(Italy) Gianluca Vizziello	Honda CBR600RR	12	Mechanical	17	
Ret	117	(Portugal) Miguel Praia	Honda CBR600RR	2	Accident	14	
Ret	5	(Indonesia) Doni Tata Pradita	Yamaha YZF-R6	2	Mechanical	19	
Ret	19	(Poland) Paweł Szkopek	Triumph Daytona 675	0	Mechanical	22	
