= 2009 Nürburgring Superbike World Championship round =

(Germany) 2009 Nürburgring Superbike World Championship round
Round details
- Round 11 of 14 rounds in the 2009 Superbike World Championship. and Round 11 of 14 rounds in the 2009 Supersport World Championship.
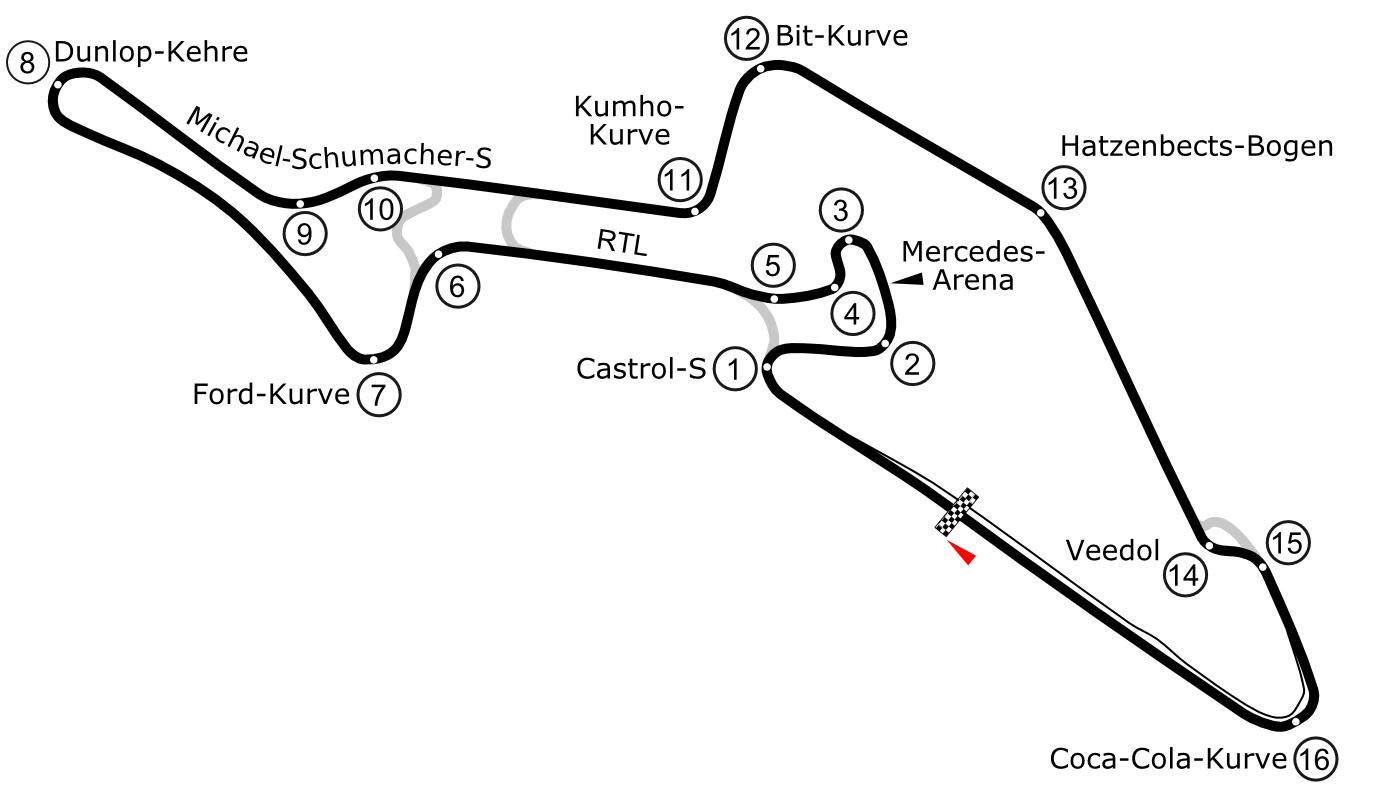
- Date: September 6, 2009
- Location: Nürburgring
- Course: Permanent racing facility 5.137 km (3.192 mi)

Superbike World Championship
Pole position
(Japan) Noriyuki Haga
1:55.489
Fastest lap race 1	Fastest lap race 2
(Japan) Noriyuki Haga	(United Kingdom) Jonathan Rea
1:56.539	1:56.234

Supersport World Championship
Pole position
(United Kingdom) Cal Crutchlow
1:57.866
Fastest lap
(United Kingdom) Cal Crutchlow
1:58.726

The 2009 Nürburgring Superbike World Championship round was the eleventh round of the 2009 Superbike World Championship season. It took place on the weekend of September 4–6, 2009, at the Nürburgring.

== Results ==
=== Superbike race 1 classification ===
Race 1 was red flagged before the completion of the first lap, due to an accident at the second corner. John Hopkins and Makoto Tamada did not take part at the second start.

Pos	No	Rider	Bike	Laps	Time	Grid	Points
1	19	(United States) Ben Spies	Yamaha YZF-R1	20	39:04.818	5	25
2	41	(Japan) Noriyuki Haga	Ducati 1098R	20	+3.850	1	20
3	7	(Spain) Carlos Checa	Honda CBR1000RR	20	+6.990	8	16
4	65	(United Kingdom) Jonathan Rea	Honda CBR1000RR	20	+7.109	2	13
5	3	(Italy) Max Biaggi	Aprilia RSV 4	20	+12.825	7	11
6	91	(United Kingdom) Leon Haslam	Honda CBR1000RR	20	+13.243	3	10
7	84	(Italy) Michel Fabrizio	Ducati 1098R	20	+14.223	4	9
8	11	(Australia) Troy Corser	BMW S1000RR	20	+14.382	6	8
9	66	(United Kingdom) Tom Sykes	Yamaha YZF-R1	20	+17.206	9	7
10	67	(United Kingdom) Shane Byrne	Ducati 1098R	20	+26.547	10	6
11	14	(France) Matthieu Lagrive	Honda CBR1000RR	20	+27.388	16	5
12	31	(Australia) Karl Muggeridge	Suzuki GSX-R1000 K9	20	+30.968	17	4
13	96	(Czech Republic) Jakub Smrž	Ducati 1098R	20	+31.069	14	3
14	9	(Japan) Ryuichi Kiyonari	Honda CBR1000RR	20	+31.188	18	2
15	71	(Japan) Yukio Kagayama	Suzuki GSX-R1000 K9	20	+40.165	13	1
16	99	(Italy) Luca Scassa	Kawasaki ZX-10R	20	+54.897	25	
17	25	(Spain) David Salom	Kawasaki ZX-10R	20	+1'01.958	23	
18	88	(Austria) Roland Resch	Suzuki GSX-R1000 K9	19	+1 Lap	27	
Ret	56	(Japan) Shinya Nakano	Aprilia RSV 4	14	Mechanical	22	
Ret	10	(Spain) Fonsi Nieto	Ducati 1098R	11	Mechanical	11	
Ret	94	(Spain) David Checa	Yamaha YZF-R1	9	Retirement	24	
Ret	77	(Italy) Vittorio Iannuzzo	Honda CBR1000RR	6	Retirement	20	
Ret	47	(United Kingdom) Richard Cooper	BMW S1000RR	5	Accident	26	
Ret	23	(Australia) Broc Parkes	Kawasaki ZX-10R	2	Accident	15	
Ret	15	(Italy) Matteo Baiocco	Ducati 1098R	2	Accident	21	
DNS	121	(United States) John Hopkins	Honda CBR1000RR		Accident in first start	19	
DNS	100	(Japan) Makoto Tamada	Kawasaki ZX-10R		Accident in first start	12	

=== Superbike race 2 classification ===
Pos	No	Rider	Manufacturer	Laps	Time	Grid	Points
1	65	(United Kingdom) Jonathan Rea	Honda CBR1000RR	20	39:01.561	2	25
2	19	(United States) Ben Spies	Yamaha YZF-R1	20	+0.786	5	20
3	7	(Spain) Carlos Checa	Honda CBR1000RR	20	+4.993	8	16
4	3	(Italy) Max Biaggi	Aprilia RSV 4	20	+8.191	7	13
5	91	(United Kingdom) Leon Haslam	Honda CBR1000RR	20	+10.907	3	11
6	11	(Australia) Troy Corser	BMW S1000RR	20	+17.152	6	10
7	9	(Japan) Ryuichi Kiyonari	Honda CBR1000RR	20	+19.473	18	9
8	66	(United Kingdom) Tom Sykes	Yamaha YZF-R1	20	+19.721	9	8
9	84	(Italy) Michel Fabrizio	Ducati 1098R	20	+22.981	4	7
10	71	(Japan) Yukio Kagayama	Suzuki GSX-R1000 K9	20	+24.161	13	6
11	96	(Czech Republic) Jakub Smrz	Ducati 1098R	20	+29.367	14	5
12	10	(Spain) Fonsi Nieto	Ducati 1098R	20	+30.007	11	4
13	23	(Australia) Broc Parkes	Kawasaki ZX-10R	20	+37.281	15	3
14	99	(Italy) Luca Scassa	Kawasaki ZX-10R	20	+47.883	25	2
15	77	(Italy) Vittorio Iannuzzo	Honda CBR1000RR	20	+49.549	20	1
16	15	(Italy) Matteo Baiocco	Ducati 1098R	20	+49.635	21	
17	25	(Spain) David Salom	Kawasaki ZX-10R	20	+1:19.554	23	
18	94	(Spain) David Checa	Yamaha YZF-R1	20	+1:22.329	24	
Ret	47	(United Kingdom) Richard Cooper	BMW S1000RR	16	Retirement	26	
Ret	31	(Australia) Karl Muggeridge	Suzuki GSX-R1000 K9	13	Accident	17	
Ret	88	(Austria) Roland Resch	Suzuki GSX-R1000 K9	13	Retirement	27	
Ret	67	(United Kingdom) Shane Byrne	Ducati 1098R	9	Accident	10	
Ret	41	(Japan) Noriyuki Haga	Ducati 1098R	4	Accident	1	
Ret	14	(France) Matthieu Lagrive	Honda CBR1000RR	1	Mechanical	16	
DNS	56	(Japan) Shinya Nakano	Aprilia RSV 4		Not started	22	
DNS	121	(United States) John Hopkins	Honda CBR1000RR		Accident in race 1	19	
DNS	100	(Japan) Makoto Tamada	Kawasaki ZX-10R		Accident in race 1	12	

=== Supersport race classification ===
Pos	No	Rider	Manufacturer	Laps	Time	Grid	Points
1	35	(United Kingdom) Cal Crutchlow	Yamaha YZF-R6	19	37:56.481	1	25
2	50	(Republic of Ireland) Eugene Laverty	Honda CBR600RR	19	+10.109	3	20
3	26	(Spain) Joan Lascorz	Kawasaki ZX-6R	19	+10.250	7	16
4	55	(Italy) Massimo Roccoli	Honda CBR600RR	19	+31.980	9	13
5	99	(France) Fabien Foret	Yamaha YZF-R6	19	+34.575	11	11
6	8	(Australia) Mark Aitchison	Honda CBR600RR	19	+34.724	14	10
7	1	(Australia) Andrew Pitt	Honda CBR600RR	19	+36.352	10	9
8	24	(Australia) Garry McCoy	Triumph Daytona 675	19	+36.391	4	8
9	127	(Denmark) Robbin Harms	Honda CBR600RR	19	+38.871	13	7
10	9	(Italy) Danilo dell'Omo	Honda CBR600RR	19	+52.944	17	6
11	117	(Portugal) Miguel Praia	Honda CBR600RR	19	+54.368	16	5
12	77	(Netherlands) Barry Veneman	Honda CBR600RR	19	+1:00.679	21	4
13	105	(Italy) Gianluca Vizziello	Honda CBR600RR	19	+1:09.096	24	3
14	91	(Germany) Kevin Wahr	Triumph Daytona 675	19	+1:11.106	20	2
15	13	(Australia) Anthony West	Honda CBR600RR	19	+1:18.979	15	1
16	16	(United Kingdom) Sam Lowes	Honda CBR600RR	19	+1:20.167	19	
17	96	(Czech Republic) Matej Smrž	Triumph Daytona 675	19	+1:20.370	18	
18	25	(United Kingdom) Michael Laverty	Honda CBR600RR	19	+1:23.973	12	
19	30	(Germany) Jesco Günther	Honda CBR600RR	19	+1:24.785	22	
20	101	(United Kingdom) Kev Coghlan	Yamaha YZF-R6	19	+1:25.686	26	
21	28	(Netherlands) Arie Vos	Honda CBR600RR	19	+1:32.556	23	
22	88	(Spain) Yannick Guerra	Yamaha YZF-R6	19	+1:45.899	28	
Ret	5	(Indonesia) Doni Tata Pradita	Yamaha YZF-R6	18	Retirement	27	
Ret	54	(Turkey) Kenan Sofuoglu	Honda CBR600RR	12	Retirement	2	
Ret	22	(Romania) Robert Muresan	Triumph Daytona 675	7	Retirement	25	
Ret	21	(Japan) Katsuaki Fujiwara	Kawasaki ZX-6R	5	Accident	6	
Ret	51	(Italy) Michele Pirro	Yamaha YZF-R6	5	Accident	5	
Ret	69	(Italy) Gianluca Nannelli	Triumph Daytona 675	5	Accident	8	

== Superstock 1000 race ==
Pos.	No.	Rider	Bike	Laps	Time/Retired	Grid	Points
1	19	(Belgium) Xavier Simeon	Ducati 1098R	11	22:13.426	2	25
2	21	(France) Maxime Berger	Honda CBR1000RR	11	+2.763	16	20
3	112	(Spain) Javier Forés	Kawasaki ZX-10R	11	+5.649	10	16
4	34	(Italy) Davide Giugliano	Suzuki GSX-R1000 K9	11	+6.620	6	13
5	71	(Italy) Claudio Corti	Suzuki GSX-R1000 K9	11	+7.085	13	11
6	29	(Italy) Daniele Beretta	Ducati 1098R	11	+7.353	7	10
7	8	(Italy) Andrea Antonelli	Yamaha YZF-R1	11	+12.097	4	9
8	69	(Czech Republic) Ondřej Ježek	Honda CBR1000RR	11	+12.338	8	8
9	30	(Switzerland) Michaël Savary	Honda CBR1000RR	11	+18.518	25	7
10	41	(Italy) Lorenzo Baroni	Yamaha YZF-R1	11	+20.807	14	6
11	91	(Sweden) Hampus Johansson	Yamaha YZF-R1	11	+25.800	19	5
12	93	(France) Mathieu Lussiana	Yamaha YZF-R1	11	+30.831	21	4
13	111	(Spain) Ismael Ortega	Kawasaki ZX-10R	11	+36.107	20	3
14	65	(France) Loris Baz	Yamaha YZF-R1	11	+36.272	1	2
15	51	(Spain) Santiago Barragán	Honda CBR1000RR	11	+37.285	32	1
16	72	(France) Nicolas Pouhair	Yamaha YZF-R1	11	+43.605	27	
17	63	(Sweden) Per Björk	Honda CBR1000RR	11	+44.218	17	
18	3	(Sweden) Alexander Lundh	Honda CBR1000RR	11	+44.447	29	
19	131	(Italy) Patrizio Valsecchi	Yamaha YZF-R1	11	+51.984	18	
20	12	(Italy) Nico Vivarelli	KTM RC8 R	11	+56.363	12	
21	64	(Italy) Danilo Andric	Yamaha YZF-R1	11	+1:03.076	28	
22	84	(Italy) Fabio Massei	Yamaha YZF-R1	10	+1 lap	9	
DSQ	16	(Netherlands) Raymond Schouten	Yamaha YZF-R1	11	(+21.230)	15	
Ret	22	(United Kingdom) Alex Lowes	MV Agusta F4 312 R	9	Accident	22	
Ret	20	(France) Sylvain Barrier	Yamaha YZF-R1	6	Retirement	3	
Ret	7	(Austria) René Mähr	Suzuki GSX-R1000 K9	6	Retirement	5	
Ret	77	(United Kingdom) Barry Burrell	Honda CBR1000RR	6	Retirement	11	
Ret	36	(Brazil) Philippe Thiriet	Honda CBR1000RR	5	Retirement	31	
Ret	53	(Germany) Dominic Lammert	Suzuki GSX-R1000 K9	3	Accident	26	
Ret	56	(Slovakia) Tomáš Svitok	MV Agusta F4 312 R	3	Accident	23	
Ret	11	(Spain) Pere Tutusaus	KTM RC8 R	2	Technical problem	30	
Ret	23	(Italy) Federico Sandi	Aprilia RSV4 Factory	2	Retirement	24	
DNQ	191	(Slovakia) Tomáš Krajčí	Honda CBR1000RR		Did not qualify		

== Superstock 600 race classification ==
Pos.	No.	Rider	Bike	Laps	Time/Retired	Grid	Points
1	55	(Belgium) Vincent Lonbois	Yamaha YZF-R6	9	18:53.030	1	25
2	9	(Italy) Danilo Petrucci	Yamaha YZF-R6	9	+1.096	3	20
3	5	(Italy) Marco Bussolotti	Yamaha YZF-R6	9	+1.383	4	16
4	47	(Italy) Eddi La Marra	Honda CBR600RR	9	+1.512	2	13
5	72	(Norway) Fredrik Karlsen	Yamaha YZF-R6	9	+1.794	5	11
6	4	(United Kingdom) Gino Rea	Honda CBR600RR	9	+7.404	7	10
7	7	(France) Baptiste Guittet	Honda CBR600RR	9	+10.811	8	9
8	89	(Austria) Stefan Kerschbaumer	Yamaha YZF-R6	9	+15.917	11	8
9	12	(Italy) Riccardo Cecchini	Honda CBR600RR	9	+26.846	13	7
10	32	(Germany) Marc Moser	Triumph Daytona 675	9	+26.924	15	6
11	36	(Poland) Andrzej Chmielewski	Yamaha YZF-R6	9	+28.690	10	5
12	10	(Italy) Nacho Calero	Yamaha YZF-R6	9	+45.707	19	4
13	26	(Romania) Mircea Vrăjitoru	Yamaha YZF-R6	9	+56.780	16	3
14	99	(Czech Republic) Michal Salač	Yamaha YZF-R6	9	+1:00.076	18	2
15	81	(Czech Republic) David Látr	Honda CBR600RR	9	+1:03.140	17	1
DSQ	48	(South Africa) James Waterman	Yamaha YZF-R6	9	(+52.231)	14	
Ret	19	(Italy) Nico Morelli	Honda CBR600RR	8	Retirement	9	
Ret	11	(France) Jérémy Guarnoni	Yamaha YZF-R6	4	Accident	6	
DNS	23	(Switzerland) Christian Von Gunten	Suzuki GSX-R600	0	Did not start	12	
DNQ	30	(Romania) Bogdan Vrăjitoru	Yamaha YZF-R6		Did not qualify		
