= Gregorio Lavilla =

Spanish motorcycle racer

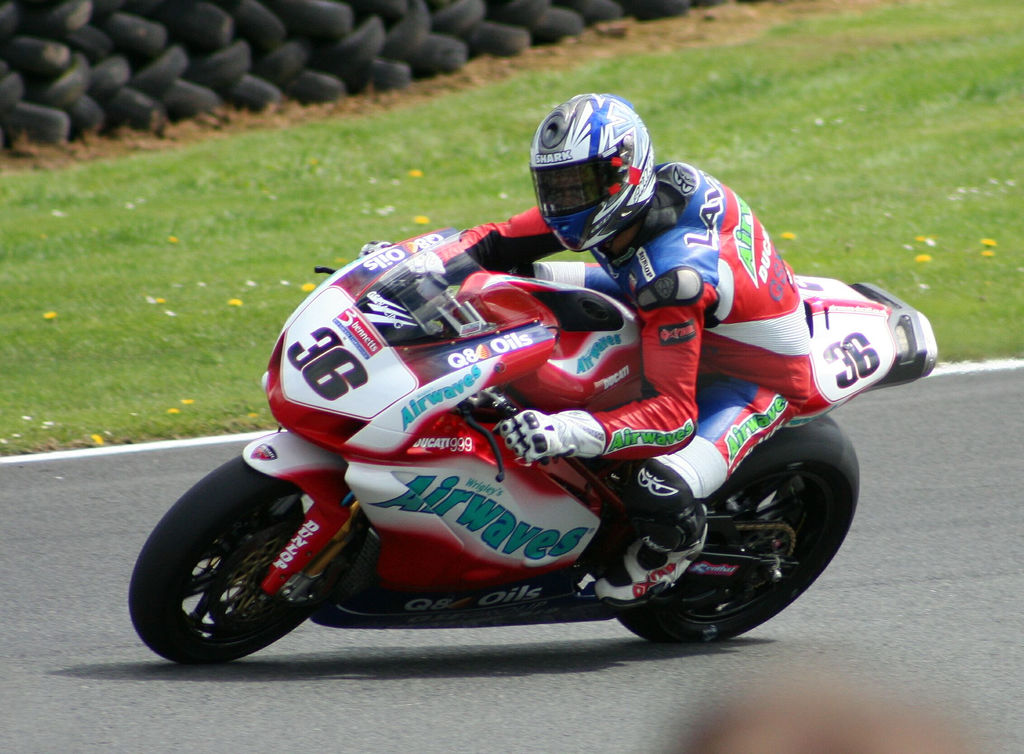
- Gregorio Lavilla 2005 BSB
- Nationality: Spanish
- Born: 29 September 1973 (age 53); Vandellòs i l'Hospitalet de l'Infant, Tarragona, Spain
- Website: gregoriolavilla.com
Motorcycle racing career statistics
MotoGP World Championship
Active years	1995, 1998, 2004
Manufacturers	Suzuki
2004 championship position	NC (0 pts)
Starts / Wins / Podiums / Poles / F. laps / Points; 18 / 0 / 0 / 0 / 0 / 7
Superbike World Championship
Active years	1994, 1996 - 2003, 2008 - 2009
Starts / Wins / Podiums / Poles / F. laps / Points; 180 / 0 / 12 / 0 / 3 / 1098,5
British Superbike Championship
Active years	2005-2007
Manufacturers	Ducati
Championships	1 (2005)
2007 championship position	4th (368 pts)
Starts / Wins / Podiums / Poles / F. laps / Points; 76 / 22 / 51 / 18 / 25 / 600

Gregorio Lavilla (born 29 September 1973) is a Spanish former professional motorcycle road racer. He has raced in MotoGP (full-time in 250s, and part-time in 500s and MotoGP itself), the Superbike World Championship, and the British Superbike Championship, taking the British crown in 2005. For 2008, he raced in WSB for the Ventaxia Honda team, finishing the championship in 12th place. He raced in four rounds of the 2009 WSB series with the Guandalini Racing Ducati team.

== Early years ==
Born in Vandellòs i l'Hospitalet de l'Infant, Tarragona, Spain, Lavilla was the Spanish Superbike champion in 1994, and raced in the 250cc Grand Prix World Championship the next year. He was runner-up in Germany's Superbike championship in 1997, on board a Ducati. In 1998, he first raced in the Superbike World Championship full-time, on a private Ducati, taking two outright podiums. He also made a one-off appearance at the German Grand Prix in the 500 cc class riding for the Honda Movistar Team of former rider Sito Pons. He then spent three years with Kawasaki's factory superbike team, finishing 8th overall despite experiencing many crashes in 1999 (including five in a row) and finishing tenth overall in 2000 despite missing four rounds through injury, before a stronger 2001, in which he was the second-highest non-wildcard in Race 1 at Sugo.

For 2002 and 2003, Lavilla raced a factory Suzuki, doing what he could on a 750cc 4-cylinder bike which lagged behind the 1000cc Ducatis (and Colin Edwards' Honda in 2002), finishing fifth overall in the relatively weak 2003 championship with 19 top-six finishes including seven podiums, although still not taking a race win. Suzuki did not enter a WSBK team in 2004, and Gregorio remained with them as a factory test rider, substituting for Yukio Kagayama in the BSB series once, and doing four MotoGP races for the team. He was released at the end of the season, leaving the way clear for his fairytale 2005.

== British Superbike Championship ==
Lavilla's victory in the 2005 British Superbike Championship was a major surprise, especially because he had never raced in the championship full-time before, and only got his ride a few days before the season started, initially to replace the injured James Haydon in the Airwaves Ducati team. He started so strongly that the team chose to retain him. He soon established himself ahead of teammate Leon Haslam, and the main rival to the Honda bikes, before a run of six wins and five second places in the final 11 races saw him take the crown.

Lavilla started 2006 in even stronger form, with six wins in the first eight races. His championship lead reached 66 points, but dropped after he crashed out of race 12 at Snetterton. Croft was not a successful meeting for him - a technical problem in race 1 and a fall in race 2 saw his championship lead down to 11 points over Haslam and 20 over Ryuichi Kiyonari's Honda. Further struggles meant that he lost the championship lead, and the final meeting was a disaster - he failed to score in either race, and slipped to third in the championship behind Kiyonari and Haslam. His totals of eight wins and ten further podiums were still impressive for a third-place overall finish.

Lavilla started 2007 spectacularly, winning the first four races, and also winning race 7. However, his form then faded and he finished fourth overall.

== World Championship part 2 ==
For 2008, Lavilla moved to the Superbike World Championship riding a Honda CBR1000RR for Ventaxia VK Honda as part of the Paul Bird team. The team failed to run near the front, but Lavilla scored points in all but two races, peaking with fourth place in a chaotic first race at Donington Park but more often finishing between 11th and 15th. For 2009, he joined the Pro Ride Honda (formerly Alto Evolution) team, before sponsorship losses forced them to part company with Lavilla and only run a partial schedule. In May 2009, Lavilla returned to WSBK with the Guandalini Racing team, initially in a one-race deal to replace the injured Brendan Roberts. It was subsequently reported that Lavilla would race with Guandalini for the rest of the season, but after four rounds (Kyalami, Miller, Misano and Donington), he was replaced at the team by Italian Matteo Baiocco.

== Career statistics ==
=== Superbike World Championship ===
==== Races by year ====
(key) (Races in bold indicate pole position) (Races in italics indicate fastest lap)

Year	Make	1		2		3		4		5		6		7		8		9		10		11		12		13		14		Pos.	Pts
Year	Make	R1	R2	R1	R2	R1	R2	R1	R2	R1	R2	R1	R2	R1	R2	R1	R2	R1	R2	R1	R2	R1	R2	R1	R2	R1	R2	R1	R2	Pos.	Pts
1994	Yamaha	GBR	GBR	GER	GER	ITA	ITA	SPA; 17	SPA; 17	AUT	AUT	INA	INA	JPN	JPN	NED	NED	SMR	SMR	EUR	EUR	AUS	AUS							NC	0
1996	Yamaha	SMR	SMR	GBR	GBR	GER	GER	ITA	ITA	CZE	CZE	USA	USA	EUR	EUR	INA	INA	JPN	JPN	NED	NED	SPA; 11	SPA; 12	AUS	AUS					32nd	9
1997	Ducati	AUS	AUS	SMR	SMR	GBR; 13	GBR; 13	GER; DNS	GER; 13	ITA	ITA	USA	USA	EUR	EUR	AUT; Ret	AUT; Ret	NED	NED	SPA; 7	SPA; Ret	JPN	JPN	INA	INA					26th	18
1998	Ducati	AUS; 11	AUS; 11	GBR; Ret	GBR; Ret	ITA; 10	ITA; Ret	SPA; 3	SPA; Ret	GER; Ret	GER; 6	SMR; Ret	SMR; 7	RSA; 3	RSA; Ret	USA; 13	USA; Ret	EUR; Ret	EUR; Ret	AUT; 11	AUT; 7	NED; Ret	NED; Ret	JPN; 17	JPN; 15					12th	83.5
1999	Kawasaki	RSA; 8	RSA; 6	AUS; Ret	AUS; Ret	GBR; Ret	GBR; Ret	SPA; 6	SPA; 4	ITA; 8	ITA; 7	GER; 4	GER; Ret	SMR; 7	SMR; 5	USA; 12	USA; 8	EUR; Ret	EUR; 10	AUT; 5	AUT; Ret	NED; 9	NED; 7	GER; 6	GER; 8	JPN; 14	JPN; 16			8th	156
2000	Kawasaki	RSA; 6	RSA; 5	AUS; 7	AUS; 4	JPN; 10	JPN; 10	GBR; 11	GBR; Ret	ITA; 6	ITA; Ret	GER	GER	SMR	SMR	SPA	SPA	USA	USA	GBR; 12	GBR; 8	NED; Ret	NED; Ret	GER; 2	GER; 4	GBR; 9	GBR; 5			10th	133
2001	Kawasaki	SPA; 5	SPA; 3	RSA; 7	RSA; 7	AUS; Ret	AUS; C	JPN; 6	JPN; 19	ITA; 4	ITA; Ret	GBR; 10	GBR; 13	GER; 6	GER; 16	SMR; 4	SMR; 3	USA; 12	USA; Ret	EUR; Ret	EUR; 14	GER; 11	GER; 7	NED; 12	NED; 9	ITA; 7	ITA; 6			10th	166
2002	Suzuki	SPA; 8	SPA; Ret	AUS; 7	AUS; 8	RSA; Ret	RSA; 11	JPN; 12	JPN; 12	ITA; 7	ITA; 5	GBR; Ret	GBR; 14	GER; 8	GER; Ret	SMR; 10	SMR; 6	USA; DNS	USA; DNS	GBR; 15	GBR; 12	GER; 8	GER; 9	NED; 7	NED; Ret	ITA; 8	ITA; 7			10th	130
2003	Suzuki	SPA; 7	SPA; 6	AUS; 3	AUS; 7	JPN; 5	JPN; 2	ITA; 3	ITA; 2	GER; Ret	GER; Ret	GBR; Ret	GBR; 2	SMR; 4	SMR; 5	USA; Ret	USA; 5	GBR; 7	GBR; 6	NED; Ret	NED; 3	ITA; 4	ITA; 3	FRA; 4	FRA; 4					5th	256
2008	Honda	QAT; 13	QAT; 14	AUS; 11	AUS; 8	SPA; 7	SPA; 11	NED; 9	NED; 7	ITA; 11	ITA; 10	USA; 13	USA; 15	GER; Ret	GER; 14	SMR; 8	SMR; 14	CZE; 15	CZE; 14	GBR; 14	GBR; 13	EUR; 4	EUR; 7	ITA; 14	ITA; Ret	FRA; 10	FRA; 12	POR; 6	POR; 8	12th	135
2009	Ducati	AUS	AUS	QAT	QAT	SPA	SPA	NED	NED	ITA	ITA	RSA; 11	RSA; 12	USA; 14	USA; Ret	SMR; 22	SMR; 15	GBR; Ret	GBR; 18	CZE	CZE	GER	GER	ITA	ITA	FRA	FRA	POR	POR	28th	12

=== Grand Prix motorcycle racing ===
==== Races by year ====
(key) (Races in bold indicate pole position, races in italics indicate fastest lap)

Year	Class	Bike	1	2	3	4	5	6	7	8	9	10	11	12	13	14	15	16	Pos.	Pts
1995	250cc	Honda	AUS; 15	MAL; 22	JPN; Ret	SPA; 23	GER; 18	ITA; 22	NED; 15	FRA; 18	GBR; 22	CZE; 18	BRA; Ret	ARG; 19	EUR; 24				32nd	2
1998	500cc	Honda	JPN	MAL	SPA	ITA	FRA	MAD	NED	GBR	GER; 11	CZE	IMO	CAT	AUS	ARG			27th	5
2004	MotoGP	Suzuki	RSA	SPA	FRA	ITA	CAT; Ret	NED	BRA	GER	GBR	CZE; Ret	POR	JPN	QAT	MAL	AUS; 16	VAL; 17	NC	0

=== British Superbike Championship ===
(key) (Races in bold indicate pole position; races in italics indicate fastest lap)

Year	Bike	1		2		3		4		5		6		7		8		9		10		11		12		13		Pos	Pts
Year	Bike	R1	R2	R1	R2	R1	R2	R1	R2	R1	R2	R1	R2	R1	R2	R1	R2	R1	R2	R1	R2	R1	R2	R1	R2	R1	R2	Pos	Pts
2004	Suzuki	SIL	SIL	BHI	BHI	SNE	SNE	OUL	OUL	MON	MON	THR; 4	THR; 3	BHGP	BHGP	KNO	KNO	MAL	MAL	CRO	CRO	CAD	CAD	OUL	OUL	DON	DON	22nd	29
2005	Ducati	BHI; 2	BHI; 3	THR; 3	THR; 2	MAL; Ret	MAL; 3	OUL; 2	OUL; Ret	MOP; 3	MOP; 1	CRO; 3	CRO; 1	KNO; 6	KNO; 3	SNE; Ret	SNE; 1	SIL; 1	SIL; 2	CAD; 2	CAD; 2	**OUL**; 2	**OUL**; 2	**DON**; 1	**DON**; 1	BHGP; 1	BHGP; 2	1st	450

Year	Make	1			2			3			4			5			6			7			8			9			10			11			12			13			Pos	Pts
Year	Make	R1	R2	R3	R1	R2	R3	R1	R2	R3	R1	R2	R3	R1	R2	R3	R1	R2	R3	R1	R2	R3	R1	R2	R3	R1	R2	R3	R1	R2	R3	R1	R2	R3	R1	R2	R3	R1	R2	R3	Pos	Pts
2006	Ducati	**BHI**; 1	**BHI**; 13		**DON**; 1	**DON**; 3		THR; 1	THR; 1		OUL; 1	OUL; 1		MON; C	MON; C		**MAL**; 3	**MAL**; 1		SNE; 3	SNE; Ret		KNO; 11	KNO; Ret		OUL; 3	OUL; Ret		CRO; 3	CRO; 3		CAD; 1	CAD; 2		**SIL**; 2	**SIL**; 2		BHGP; Ret	BHGP; Ret		**3rd**	**377**
2007	Ducati	BHGP; 1	BHGP; 1		THR; 1	THR; 1		SIL; 5	SIL; 2		**OUL**; 1	**OUL**; 4		SNE; 6	SNE; Ret		MON; 3	MON; 3		KNO; 7	KNO; Ret		OUL; Ret	OUL; 10		MAL; 5	MAL'; 7		CRO; 6	CRO; 4		CAD; 7	CAD; 3		DON; 4	DON; 5		**BHI**; 1	**BHI**; 1		4th	368

== Post racing career ==
In 2012, Lavilla joined the Avintia Blusens MotoGP CRT team as crew chief, from the second round of testing onwards. In 2013, he became a member of the new Dorna WorldSBK Orangisation (DWO), to become the WorldSBK Sporting director later.

== Personal ==
Lavilla's sporting heroes are Mick Doohan, Wayne Rainey and Lance Armstrong. He is unmarried and lives in L'Hospitalet de l'Infant.
