= 2007 British Superbike Championship =

Motorsport event

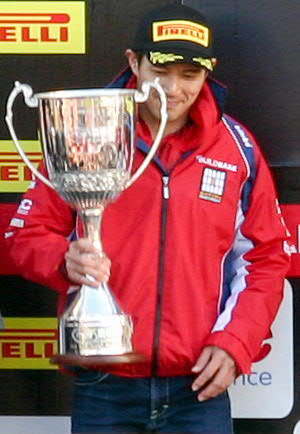
2007 champion, Ryuichi Kiyonari

The Bennetts 2007 British Superbike Championship season started on 7 April and ended on 14 October. Defending Champion Ryuichi Kiyonari repeated as the 2007 BSB Champion on a HM Plant Racing HRC Honda CBR1000RR.

== Calendar ==
2007 Calendar
| Round | | Circuit | Date | Pole position | Fastest lap | Winning rider | Winning team |
|---|---|---|---|---|---|---|---|
| 1 | R1 | (England) Brands Hatch GP | 9 April | (Northern Ireland) Jonathan Rea | (Spain) Gregorio Lavilla | (Spain) Gregorio Lavilla | Airwaves Ducati |
| 1 | R2 | (England) Brands Hatch GP | 9 April | (Northern Ireland) Jonathan Rea | (Northern Ireland) Jonathan Rea | (Spain) Gregorio Lavilla | Airwaves Ducati |
| 2 | R1 | (England) Thruxton | 15 April | (England) Tommy Hill | (Spain) Gregorio Lavilla | (Spain) Gregorio Lavilla | Airwaves Ducati |
| 2 | R2 | (England) Thruxton | 15 April | (England) Tommy Hill | (England) Shane Byrne | (Spain) Gregorio Lavilla | Airwaves Ducati |
| 3 | R1 | (England) Silverstone | 29 April | (Japan) Ryuichi Kiyonari | (Spain) Gregorio Lavilla | (Japan) Ryuichi Kiyonari | HM Plant Honda |
| 3 | R2 | (England) Silverstone | 29 April | (Japan) Ryuichi Kiyonari | (Spain) Gregorio Lavilla | (Japan) Ryuichi Kiyonari | HM Plant Honda |
| 4 | R1 | (England) Oulton Park | 7 May | (Spain) Gregorio Lavilla | (England) Shane Byrne | (Spain) Gregorio Lavilla | Airwaves Ducati |
| 4 | R2 | (England) Oulton Park | 7 May | (Spain) Gregorio Lavilla | (Northern Ireland) Jonathan Rea | (Japan) Ryuichi Kiyonari | HM Plant Honda |
| 5 | R1 | (England) Snetterton | 20 May | (England) Shane Byrne | (Spain) Gregorio Lavilla | (Japan) Ryuichi Kiyonari | HM Plant Honda |
| 5 | R2 | (England) Snetterton | 20 May | (England) Shane Byrne | (Japan) Ryuichi Kiyonari | (Japan) Ryuichi Kiyonari | HM Plant Honda |
| 6 | R1 | (Republic of Ireland) Mondello Park | 17 June | (Northern Ireland) Jonathan Rea | (England) Shane Byrne | (England) Leon Haslam | Airwaves Ducati |
| 6 | R2 | (Republic of Ireland) Mondello Park | 17 June | (Northern Ireland) Jonathan Rea | (Northern Ireland) Jonathan Rea | (Northern Ireland) Jonathan Rea | HM Plant Honda |
| 7 | R1 | (Scotland) Knockhill | 1 July | (Northern Ireland) Jonathan Rea | (Northern Ireland) Jonathan Rea | (Northern Ireland) Jonathan Rea | HM Plant Honda |
| 7 | R2 | (Scotland) Knockhill | 1 July | (Northern Ireland) Jonathan Rea | (Northern Ireland) Jonathan Rea | (Northern Ireland) Jonathan Rea | HM Plant Honda |
| 8 | R1 | England Oulton Park | 15 July | (Northern Ireland) Jonathan Rea | (Japan) Ryuichi Kiyonari | (Japan) Ryuichi Kiyonari | HM Plant Honda |
| 8 | R2 | England Oulton Park | 15 July | (Northern Ireland) Jonathan Rea | (Japan) Ryuichi Kiyonari | (Northern Ireland) Jonathan Rea | HM Plant Honda |
| 9 | R1 | (England) Mallory Park | 22 July | (Japan) Ryuichi Kiyonari | (Japan) Ryuichi Kiyonari | (England) Shane Byrne | Stobart Vent-Axia Honda |
| 9 | R2 | (England) Mallory Park | 22 July | (Japan) Ryuichi Kiyonari | (Japan) Ryuichi Kiyonari | (Japan) Ryuichi Kiyonari | HM Plant Honda |
| 10 | R1 | (England) Croft | 12 August | (England) Cal Crutchlow | (England) Leon Haslam | (Japan) Ryuichi Kiyonari | HM Plant Honda |
| 10 | R2 | (England) Croft | 12 August | (England) Cal Crutchlow | (Japan) Ryuichi Kiyonari | (Japan) Ryuichi Kiyonari | HM Plant Honda |
| 11 | R1 | (England) Cadwell Park | 27 August | (England) Leon Haslam | (England) Leon Camier | (England) Leon Haslam | Airwaves Ducati |
| 11 | R2 | (England) Cadwell Park | 27 August | (England) Leon Haslam | (England) Leon Haslam | (Northern Ireland) Jonathan Rea | HM Plant Honda |
| 12 | R1 | (England) Donington Park | 23 September | (England) Tom Sykes | (Japan) Ryuichi Kiyonari | (England) Leon Haslam | Airwaves Ducati |
| 12 | R2 | (England) Donington Park | 23 September | (England) Tom Sykes | (Japan) Ryuichi Kiyonari | (England) Leon Haslam | Airwaves Ducati |
| 13 | R1 | (England) Brands Hatch Indy | 14 October | (Spain) Gregorio Lavilla | (Spain) Gregorio Lavilla | (Spain) Gregorio Lavilla | Airwaves Ducati |
| 13 | R2 | (England) Brands Hatch Indy | 14 October | (Spain) Gregorio Lavilla | (Spain) Gregorio Lavilla | (Spain) Gregorio Lavilla | Airwaves Ducati |

== Entry list ==
2007 Entry List
| Team | Bike | No | Riders | Class | Rounds |
|---|---|---|---|---|---|
| HM Plant Racing Honda | Honda CBR1000RR | 1 | (Japan) Ryuichi Kiyonari | | All |
| HM Plant Racing Honda | Honda CBR1000RR | 4 | (Northern Ireland) Jonathan Rea | | All |
| Bike Animal Honda | Honda CBR1000RR | 2 | (England) Leon Camier | | 1–11 |
| Bike Animal Honda | Honda CBR1000RR | 2 | (England) Ian Hutchinson | | 12–13 |
| Isolon MSS Discovery Kawasaki | Kawasaki ZX-10R | 3 | (England) Michael Rutter | | 1–5, 8–13 |
| Isolon MSS Discovery Kawasaki | Kawasaki ZX-10R | 3 | (Scotland) Stuart Easton | | 6–7 |
| Hydrex Honda | Honda CBR1000RR | 5 | (England) Karl Harris | | All |
| Hydrex Honda | Honda CBR1000RR | 15 | (England) Guy Martin | | 1–3, 8, 11 |
| Hydrex Honda | Honda CBR1000RR | 64 | (England) Aaron Zanotti | | 12–13 |
| Virgin Media Optoma Loans | Yamaha YZF-R1 | 6 | (England) James Haydon | | 1–3 |
| Virgin Media Optoma Loans | Yamaha YZF-R1 | 6 | (South Africa) Hudson Kennaugh | | 4–7 |
| Virgin Media Optoma Loans | Yamaha YZF-R1 | 8 | (England) Tommy Hill | | All |
| Virgin Media Optoma Loans | Yamaha YZF-R1 | 77 | (Northern Ireland) Marty Nutt | | 12–13 |
| Rizla Suzuki | Suzuki GSX-R1000 K7 | 9 | (England) Chris Walker | | All |
| Rizla Suzuki | Suzuki GSX-R1000 K7 | 35 | (England) Cal Crutchlow | | All |
| Mark Johns Motors | Honda CBR1000RR | 11 | (Northern Ireland) Ryan Farquhar | C | 1–2 |
| Mark Johns Motors | Honda CBR1000RR | 52 | (Northern Ireland) Ryan Rainey | C | 10–11 |
| Mark Johns Motors | Honda CBR1000RR | 52 | (Scotland) Iain MacPherson | | 12 |
| TAG Racing | Honda CBR1000RR | 11 | (Republic of Ireland) Brian McCormack | C | 9 |
| TAG Racing | Honda CBR1000RR | 14 | (Republic of Ireland) Brian McCormack | C | 6 |
| Samsung Superbike Team | Suzuki GSX-R1000 K6 | 12 | (Australia) Dean Thomas | | 1–6, 8–13 (Note: Dean Thomas competed in both friday and saturday practice sessions during round 8, before being replaced by Sean Emmett for the rest of the weekend.) |
| Samsung Superbike Team | Suzuki GSX-R1000 K6 | 12 | (England) Sean Emmett | | 7–8 |
| Samsung Superbike Team | Suzuki GSX-R1000 K6 | 112 | (England) Sean Emmett | | 12–13 |
| Jentin Racing | Yamaha YZF-R1 | 12 | (England) Simon Andrews | | 1–2, 4–5, 8–11, 13 |
| Jentin Racing | Yamaha YZF-R1 | 12 | (England) Jon Kirkham | | 12 |
| Team NB | Suzuki GSX-R1000 K6 | 18 | (England) Tommy Bridewell | | 1–9, 12–13 |
| Team NB | Suzuki GSX-R1000 K6 | 46 | (England) Ollie Bridewell | | 1–9* |
| Hardinge-Ice Valley Motorsport | Honda CBR1000RR | 21 | (England) Tom Tunstall | C | All |
| AIM Racing | Yamaha YZF-R1 | 22 | (England) Steve Plater | | 1–3, 5–8, 11–13 (Note: Steve Plater competed in two friday practice sessions during round 8, before being replaced by Les Shand for the rest of the weekend.) |
| AIM Racing | Yamaha YZF-R1 | 22 | (Scotland) Les Shand | | 8 |
| AIM Racing | Yamaha YZF-R1 | 22 | (Scotland) Keith Amor | | 9–10 |
| Krystal Racing | Yamaha YZF-R1 | 24 | (England) Lee Jackson | C | 9 |
| Red Viper Racing | Honda CBR1000RR | 26 | (England) Chris Martin | | All |
| PBM Racing Ireland | Yamaha YZF-R1 | 27 | (Republic of Ireland) Paul Barron | C | 1–10, 12–13 |
| Team Emco – NSF Racing | Yamaha YZF-R1 | 28 | (England) Neil Faulkner | C | 1–8, 10–13 |
| Astro KS Kawasaki | Kawasaki ZX-10R | 32 | (Scotland) Kenny Gilbertson | C | 13 |
| Ezylet Phase One | Yamaha YZF-R1 | 34 | (England) Guy Martin | | 13 |
| Airwaves Ducati | Ducati 999 F06 | 36 | (Spain) Gregorio Lavilla | | All |
| Airwaves Ducati | Ducati 999 F06 | 91 | (England) Leon Haslam | | All |
| Riders Racing | Honda CBR1000RR | 40 | (England) Martin Jessopp | C | 13 |
| Team Millsport Racing | Yamaha YZF-R1 | 49 | (Isle of Man) Conor Cummins | C | 12 |
| Quay Garage | Honda CBR1000RR | 56 | (England) James Buckingham | C | All |
| Hawk Kawasaki | Kawasaki ZX-10R | 6 | (England) James Haydon | | 11–13 |
| Hawk Kawasaki | Kawasaki ZX-10R | 88 | (England) Scott Smart | | All |
| Hawk Kawasaki | Kawasaki ZX-10R | 150 | (England) Peter Hickman | | 1–9 |
| Hawk Kawasaki | Kawasaki ZX-10R | 150 | (England) Alex Camier | | 10 |
| SMT Yamaha | Yamaha YZF-R1 | 64 | (England) Aaron Zanotti | | 1–11 |
| SMT Yamaha | Yamaha YZF-R1 | 65 | (England) John Ingram | | 12–13 |
| Stobart Vent-Axia Honda | Honda CBR1000RR | 66 | (England) Tom Sykes | | All |
| Stobart Vent-Axia Honda | Honda CBR1000RR | 67 | (England) Shane Byrne | | All |
| PR Branson-Honda | Honda CBR1000RR | 68 | (England) Sean Emmett | | 1–2, 4–5 |
| PR Branson-Honda | Honda CBR1000RR | 68 | (Australia) David Johnson | | 9, 11–13 |
| Nutt Travel | Yamaha YZF-R1 | 77 | (Northern Ireland) Marty Nutt | C | 1–3, 5–11 |
| Uel Duncan Racing | Honda CBR1000RR | 86 | (Australia) Cameron Donald | | 2 |
| T.H.R Honda | Honda CBR1000RR | 94 | (England) Michael Howarth | C | 1 |
| T.H.R Honda | Honda CBR1000RR | 94 | (England) Tristan Palmer | C | 3–13 |
| MAR | Kawasaki ZX-10R | 111 | (England) Malcolm Ashley | C | All |

| Icon | Class |
|---|---|
| C | Privateers Cup |

Key
Regular Rider
Wildcard Rider
Replacement Rider
* Rider died mid-season

== Final championship standings ==
Points system
| Position | **1st** | **2nd** | **3rd** | **4th** | **5th** | **6th** | **7th** | **8th** | **9th** | **10th** | **11th** | **12th** | **13th** | **14th** | **15th** |
| Race | 25 | 20 | 16 | 13 | 11 | 10 | 9 | 8 | 7 | 6 | 5 | 4 | 3 | 2 | 1 |

| Pos | Rider | Bike! | Class | BHGP (England) | | THR (England) | | SIL (England) | | OUL (England) | | SNE (England) | | MOP (Republic of Ireland) | | KNO (Scotland) | | OUL (England) | | MAL (England) | | CRO (England) | | CAD (England) | | DON (England) | | BHI (England) | | Pts |
| Pos | Rider | Bike! | Class | R1 | R2 | R1 | R2 | R1 | R2 | R1 | R2 | R1 | R2 | R1 | R2 | R1 | R2 | R1 | R2 | R1 | R2 | R1 | R2 | R1 | R2 | R1 | R2 | R1 | R2 | Pts |
|---|---|---|---|---|---|---|---|---|---|---|---|---|---|---|---|---|---|---|---|---|---|---|---|---|---|---|---|---|---|---|
| 1 | (Japan) Ryuichi Kiyonari | Honda | | 8 | 11 | 3 | 2 | **1** | **1** | 3 | 1 | 1 | 1 | 5 | 5 | 2 | 3 | 1 | Ret | **Ret** | **1** | 1 | 1 | 2 | 2 | Ret | 3 | 3 | 4 | 433 |
| 2 | (Northern Ireland) Jonathan Rea | Honda | | **3** | **2** | Ret | 4 | 2 | 3 | 4 | 5 | 2 | 2 | **4** | **1** | **1** | **1** | **Ret** | **1** | 2 | Ret | 2 | 2 | Ret | 1 | 5 | 7 | 2 | 2 | 407 |
| 3 | (England) Leon Haslam | Ducati | | 6 | 4 | 6 | 6 | 6 | 5 | 2 | 2 | 3 | 5 | 1 | 4 | 3 | 2 | 4 | 4 | 3 | 2 | 5 | 6 | **1** | **Ret** | 1 | 1 | 4 | 5 | 387 |
| 4 | (Spain) Gregorio Lavilla | Ducati | | 1 | 1 | 1 | 1 | 5 | 2 | **1** | **4** | 6 | Ret | 3 | 3 | 7 | Ret | Ret | 10 | 5 | 7 | 6 | 4 | 7 | 3 | 4 | 5 | **1** | **1** | 368 |
| 5 | (England) Shane Byrne | Honda | | 4 | 13 | 4 | 3 | Ret | Ret | 6 | 3 | **Ret** | **3** | 2 | 2 | 4 | 5 | 2 | 3 | 1 | 3 | 9 | 7 | 4 | Ret | 3 | 6 | 6 | Ret | 293 |
| 6 | (England) Tom Sykes | Honda | | 7 | 5 | 5 | 7 | 7 | 6 | 5 | 6 | 4 | 4 | Ret | 7 | 6 | 4 | Ret | 6 | 6 | 4 | 3 | 3 | 3 | 5 | **2** | **2** | Ret | 7 | 279 |
| 7 | (England) Chris Walker | Suzuki | | 5 | 8 | 9 | Ret | 3 | 4 | Ret | 9 | 9 | 9 | 9 | Ret | 5 | 6 | 3 | 8 | 4 | 6 | 8 | 10 | 8 | 6 | 6 | 4 | 7 | 6 | 225 |
| 8 | (England) Leon Camier | Honda | | 2 | 3 | 2 | 5 | 4 | Ret | 8 | 8 | 5 | 6 | 7 | 6 | Ret | 7 | 6 | 5 | 8 | 11 | 7 | 5 | Ret | Ret | | | | | 199 |
| 9 | (England) Cal Crutchlow | Suzuki | | 13 | 18 | 7 | Ret | 11 | 7 | 7 | Ret | 8 | Ret | 8 | Ret | 11 | Ret | 5 | Ret | 9 | 5 | **4** | **13** | 5 | 4 | Ret | Ret | 5 | 3 | 152 |
| 10 | (England) Tommy Hill | Yamaha | | 9 | Ret | **8** | **10** | 8 | 8 | 10 | 7 | 7 | 7 | 10 | 9 | 13 | Ret | 8 | Ret | 7 | 9 | 10 | Ret | 6 | 7 | Ret | Ret | Ret | 13 | 138 |
| 11 | (England) Karl Harris | Honda | | 14 | 6 | 10 | 9 | 9 | 12 | 9 | Ret | 13 | 15 | 6 | 8 | 10 | 8 | Ret | 2 | Ret | 13 | 11 | Ret | Ret | DNS | Ret | 10 | Ret | 8 | 121 |
| 12 | (England) Michael Rutter | Kawasaki | | 10 | 7 | 11 | 8 | 10 | 9 | 15 | 13 | 11 | Ret | | | | | Ret | 7 | Ret | 8 | 13 | 8 | 11 | 10 | 9 | 8 | 8 | 10 | 118 |
| 13 | (England) Scott Smart | Kawasaki | | 21 | 20 | 14 | 11 | Ret | 14 | 11 | 16 | 14 | 8 | 12 | 10 | Ret | DNS | 7 | 11 | 10 | 10 | 14 | 11 | 10 | 12 | 7 | Ret | 11 | 12 | 95 |
| 14 | (England) Ollie Bridewell | Suzuki | | 19 | 15 | Ret | 19 | 13 | 11 | 13 | 11 | 18 | 10 | Ret | 11 | 8 | 10 | 9 | 9 | WD | WD | | | | | | | | | 56 |
| 15 | (England) Steve Plater | Yamaha | | 18 | 14 | 13 | 13 | 19 | Ret | | | 15 | Ret | Ret | 12 | 18 | 12 | WD | WD | | | | | 13 | 9 | 10 | 9 | 10 | 11 | 51 |
| 16 | (England) Simon Andrews | Yamaha | | 11 | 9 | 21 | 16 | | | 12 | 14 | 12 | Ret | | | | | Ret | DNS | 11 | 12 | 12 | 9 | Ret | Ret | | | 9 | 16 | 49 |
| 17 | (Australia) Dean Thomas | Suzuki | | 16 | 10 | 16 | Ret | 14 | 13 | Ret | 10 | Ret | 13 | 14 | 13 | | | WD | WD | 12 | 14 | 16 | 12 | 14 | Ret | Ret | DNS | 16 | 19 | 37 |
| 18 | (England) James Haydon | Kawasaki | | | | | | | | | | | | | | | | | | | | | | 9 | 8 | 8 | Ret | Ret | 9 | 31 |
| 18 | (England) James Haydon | Yamaha | | 17 | 16 | 17 | 17 | 15 | 16 | | | | | | | | | | | | | | | | | | | | | 31 |
| 19 | (England) Tommy Bridewell | Suzuki | | 12 | Ret | 15 | Ret | 12 | 10 | 14 | 12 | 10 | Ret | Ret | DNS | 20 | 17 | DNS | DNS | WD | WD | | | | | 18 | 19 | 15 | 21 | 28 |
| 20 | (England) Tristan Palmer | Honda | C | | | | | 20 | 20 | 18 | 19 | Ret | Ret | 19 | 15 | 16 | 14 | 11 | 12 | 13 | 17 | Ret | Ret | 15 | 13 | 12 | 15 | 14 | 15 | 27 |
| 21 | (England) Chris Martin | Honda | | 22 | Ret | Ret | 18 | 17 | 17 | Ret | 15 | Ret | 14 | 11 | Ret | Ret | Ret | Ret | DNS | 15 | 15 | 15 | Ret | 12 | 11 | Ret | 13 | Ret | Ret | 23 |
| 22 | (England) Peter Hickman | Kawasaki | | 15 | 12 | 12 | 12 | 18 | 19 | DNS | DNS | 17 | Ret | 17 | 14 | 23 | DNS | 13 | 13 | 14 | 16 | | | | | | | | | 23 |
| 23 | (England) Ian Hutchinson | Honda | | | | | | | | | | | | | | | | | | | | | | | | 11 | 11 | 12 | 14 | 16 |
| 24 | (England) Sean Emmett | Honda | | 20 | Ret | Ret | Ret | | | 21 | Ret | Ret | Ret | | | | | | | | | | | | | | | | | 14 |
| 24 | (England) Sean Emmett | Suzuki | | | | | | | | | | | | | | 9 | 9 | Ret | Ret | | | | | | | DNS | DNS | Ret | 18 | 14 |
| 25 | (South Africa) Hudson Kennaugh | Yamaha | | | | | | | | 16 | 17 | 19 | 12 | 13 | Ret | 12 | 13 | | | | | | | | | | | | | 14 |
| 26 | (England) Aaron Zanotti | Honda | | | | | | | | | | | | | | | | | | | | | | | | 14 | 12 | Ret | 20 | 13 |
| 26 | (England) Aaron Zanotti | Yamaha | | 24 | 19 | 22 | 21 | Ret | 18 | 19 | Ret | 16 | 11 | Ret | Ret | 19 | 16 | 16 | Ret | 21 | Ret | 18 | 14 | Ret | 17 | | | | | 13 |
| 27 | (England) Guy Martin | Honda | | Ret | 17 | 18 | 15 | 16 | 15 | | | | | | | | | 10 | Ret | | | | | 17 | Ret | | | | | 8 |
| 27 | (England) Guy Martin | Yamaha | | | | | | | | | | | | | | | | | | | | | | | | | | 18 | 22 | 8 |
| 28 | (Scotland) Stuart Easton | Kawasaki | | | | | | | | | | | | 15 | Ret | 14 | 11 | | | | | | | | | | | | | 8 |
| 29 | (Northern Ireland) Marty Nutt | Yamaha | C | Ret | Ret | 23 | 20 | DNS | DNS | | | 20 | 16 | 16 | 16 | 17 | 15 | 17 | 15 | 19 | Ret | 17 | 16 | Ret | Ret | | | | | 8 |
| 29 | (Northern Ireland) Marty Nutt | Yamaha | | | | | | | | | | | | | | | | | | | | | | | | 13 | 17 | 13 | 17 | 8 |
| 30 | (England) Tom Tunstall | Honda | C | 25 | 22 | 24 | 22 | Ret | Ret | Ret | DNS | 22 | 21 | 21 | 20 | 21 | 19 | 14 | 14 | 20 | 20 | 20 | 18 | 18 | 15 | 16 | 18 | 19 | Ret | 5 |
| 31 | (England) Malcolm Ashley | Kawasaki | C | 26 | Ret | 26 | 23 | 22 | 21 | 20 | 20 | 23 | 19 | 22 | 19 | 22 | 18 | 12 | Ret | 22 | 21 | 22 | 19 | 20 | 18 | 20 | Ret | 20 | 25 | 4 |
| 32 | (England) James Buckingham | Honda | C | 23 | 21 | 19 | Ret | WD | WD | 17 | 18 | 21 | 17 | 23 | 21 | Ret | 20 | 15 | 16 | 18 | Ret | 19 | 15 | 16 | 14 | 19 | 22 | 17 | Ret | 4 |
| 33 | (Australia) Cameron Donald | Honda | | | | 20 | 14 | | | | | | | | | | | | | | | | | | | | | | | 2 |
| 34 | (England) Jon Kirkham | Yamaha | | | | | | | | | | | | | | | | | | | | | | | | Ret | 14 | | | 2 |
| 35 | (Republic of Ireland) Paul Barron | Yamaha | C | DNQ | DNQ | 25 | 24 | 21 | Ret | 22 | Ret | Ret | 18 | 18 | 17 | 15 | Ret | Ret | Ret | Ret | DNS | Ret | 21 | | | DNS | DNS | Ret | Ret | 1 |
| 36 | (Australia) David Johnson | Honda | | | | | | | | | | | | | | | | | | 17 | 18 | | | 19 | 16 | 15 | 16 | Ret | DNS | 1 |

| Colour | Result |
|---|---|
| Gold | Winner |
| Silver | Second place |
| Bronze | Third place |
| Green | Points classification |
| Blue | Non-points classification |
| Blue | Non-classified finish (NC) |
| Purple | Retired, not classified (Ret) |
| Red | Did not qualify (DNQ) |
| Red | Did not pre-qualify (DNPQ) |
| Black | Disqualified (DSQ) |
| White | Did not start (DNS) |
| White | Withdrew (WD) |
| White | Race cancelled (C) |
| Blank | Did not practice (DNP) |
| Blank | Did not arrive (DNA) |
| Blank | Excluded (EX) |

**Bold** - Pole
Italics - Fastest Lap

| Icon | Class |
|---|---|
| **C** | Privateers Cup |

=== Superbike cup final standings (top 10) ===
| Pos | Rider | Bike | Pts |
|---|---|---|---|
| 1 | (England) Tristan Palmer | Honda | 426 |
| 2 | (England) James Buckingham | Honda | 373 |
| 3 | (England) Tom Tunstall | Honda | 332 |
| 4 | (England) Malcolm Ashley | Kawasaki | 322 |
| 5 | (Northern Ireland) Marty Nutt | Yamaha | 261 |
| 6 | (Republic of Ireland) Paul Barron | Yamaha | 147 |
| 7 | (England) Neil Faulkner | Yamaha | 90 |
| 8 | (England) Lee Jackson | Yamaha | 40 |
| 9 | (Republic of Ireland) Brian McCormack | Honda | 37 |
| 10 | (Northern Ireland) Ryan Farquhar | Honda | 21 |

=== Final Constructors Standings ===
| 1 | (Japan) Honda | 591 |
| 2 | (Italy) Ducati | 507 |
| 3 | (Japan) Suzuki | 263 |
| 4 | (Japan) Yamaha | 180 |
| 5 | (Japan) Kawasaki | 169 |
