= 2005 British Superbike Championship =

British motorcycle racing season

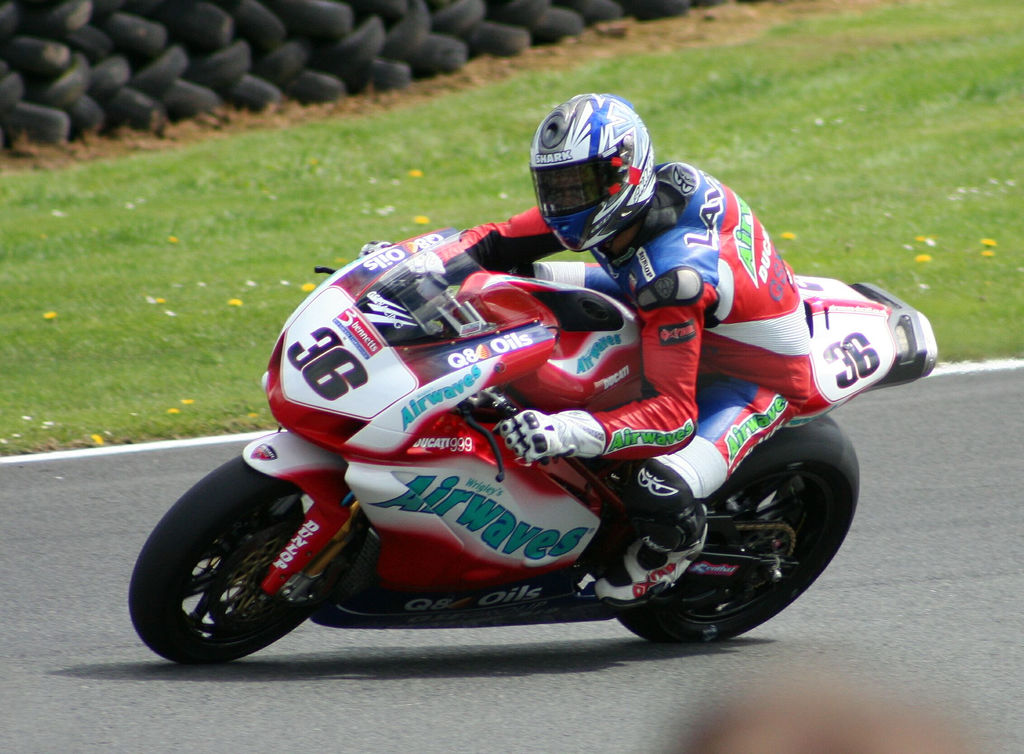
2005 champion Gregorio Lavilla at Oulton Park

The 2005 British Superbike season started on 26 March and ended on 9 October. It included 55 riders on 25 teams from 8 countries.^{#} Riders used machines from 5 different constructors, including Honda, Ducati, Kawasaki, Suzuki and Yamaha.
Spaniard Gregorio Lavilla became the first non former Commonwealth rider to clinch the BSB Championship Title onboard a Airwaves sponsored GSE Racing Ducati 999 F04.

== Calendar ==
2005 Calendar
Round		Circuit	Date	Pole position	Fastest lap	Winning rider	Winning team
1	R1	(England) Brands Hatch Indy	28 March	(England) Leon Haslam	(Japan) Ryuichi Kiyonari	(Japan) Ryuichi Kiyonari	HM Plant Honda
1	R2	(England) Brands Hatch Indy	28 March	(England) Leon Haslam	(Spain) Gregorio Lavilla	(Japan) Ryuichi Kiyonari	HM Plant Honda
2	R1	(England) Thruxton	10 April	(England) Michael Rutter	(Spain) Gregorio Lavilla	(Japan) Ryuichi Kiyonari	HM Plant Honda
2	R2	(England) Thruxton	10 April	(England) Michael Rutter	(Spain) Gregorio Lavilla	(Japan) Ryuichi Kiyonari	HM Plant Honda
3	R1	(England) Mallory Park	24 April	(Japan) Ryuichi Kiyonari	(England) Michael Rutter	(England) Michael Rutter	HM Plant Honda
3	R2	(England) Mallory Park	24 April	(Japan) Ryuichi Kiyonari	(Spain) Gregorio Lavilla	(England) Michael Rutter	HM Plant Honda
4	R1	(England) Oulton Park	2 May	(England) Michael Rutter	(England) Michael Rutter	(England) Michael Rutter	HM Plant Honda
4	R2	(England) Oulton Park	2 May	(England) Michael Rutter	(Australia) Dean Thomas	(England) Leon Haslam	Airwaves Ducati
5	R1	(Republic of Ireland) Mondello Park	15 May	(Northern Ireland) Jonathan Rea	(Australia) Glen Richards	(Japan) Ryuichi Kiyonari	HM Plant Honda
5	R2	(Republic of Ireland) Mondello Park	15 May	(Northern Ireland) Jonathan Rea	(Spain) Gregorio Lavilla	(Spain) Gregorio Lavilla	Airwaves Ducati
6	R1	(England) Croft	5 June	(England) Michael Rutter	(Japan) Ryuichi Kiyonari	(Japan) Ryuichi Kiyonari	HM Plant Honda
6	R2	(England) Croft	5 June	(England) Michael Rutter	(Spain) Gregorio Lavilla	(Spain) Gregorio Lavilla	Airwaves Ducati
7	R1	(Scotland) Knockhill	26 June	(Japan) Ryuichi Kiyonari	(Japan) Ryuichi Kiyonari	(Japan) Ryuichi Kiyonari	HM Plant Honda
7	R2	(Scotland) Knockhill	26 June	(Japan) Ryuichi Kiyonari	(England) Michael Rutter	(Japan) Ryuichi Kiyonari	HM Plant Honda
8	R1	(England) Snetterton	10 July	(England) Leon Haslam	(Japan) Ryuichi Kiyonari	(Japan) Ryuichi Kiyonari	HM Plant Honda
8	R2	(England) Snetterton	10 July	(England) Leon Haslam	(Northern Ireland) Michael Laverty	(Spain) Gregorio Lavilla	Airwaves Ducati
9	R1	(England) Silverstone	21 August	(Japan) Ryuichi Kiyonari	(Japan) Ryuichi Kiyonari	(Spain) Gregorio Lavilla	Airwaves Ducati
9	R2	(England) Silverstone	21 August	(Japan) Ryuichi Kiyonari	(Spain) Gregorio Lavilla	(Japan) Ryuichi Kiyonari	HM Plant Honda
10	R1	(England) Cadwell Park	29 August	(England) Leon Haslam	(Japan) Ryuichi Kiyonari	(England) Tommy Hill	Virgin Mobile Samsung
10	R2	(England) Cadwell Park	29 August	(England) Leon Haslam	(Spain) Gregorio Lavilla	(England) Leon Haslam	Airwaves Ducati
11	R1	(England) Oulton Park	11 September	(Spain) Gregorio Lavilla	(Spain) Gregorio Lavilla	(Japan) Ryuichi Kiyonari	HM Plant Honda
11	R2	(England) Oulton Park	11 September	(Spain) Gregorio Lavilla	(England) John Reynolds	(Japan) Ryuichi Kiyonari	HM Plant Honda
12	R1	(England) Donington Park	25 September	(Spain) Gregorio Lavilla	(Spain) Gregorio Lavilla	(Spain) Gregorio Lavilla	Airwaves Ducati
12	R2	(England) Donington Park	25 September	(Spain) Gregorio Lavilla	(Spain) Gregorio Lavilla	(Spain) Gregorio Lavilla	Airwaves Ducati
13	R1	(England) Brands Hatch GP	9 October	(England) James Haydon	(England) Leon Haslam	(Spain) Gregorio Lavilla	Airwaves Ducati
13	R2	(England) Brands Hatch GP	9 October	(England) James Haydon	(Spain) Gregorio Lavilla	(England) Leon Haslam	Airwaves Ducati

== Entry list ==
2005 Entry List
Team	Bike	No	Riders	Class	Rounds
Rizla	Suzuki GSX-R1000	1	(England) John Reynolds		1–3, 6–13 (Note: John Reynolds competed in the first friday practice session during round 13, before being replaced by James Buckingham for the rest of the weekend.)
Rizla	Suzuki GSX-R1000	88	(England) Scott Smart		1–6
Rizla	Suzuki GSX-R1000	11	(England) James Haydon		4–5, 7–13
Rizla	Suzuki GSX-R1000	56	(England) James Buckingham		13
HM Plant	Honda CBR1000RR	2	(England) Michael Rutter		All
HM Plant	Honda CBR1000RR	6	(Japan) Ryuichi Kiyonari		1–3, 5–13
Stobart	Honda CBR1000RR	3	(England) Gary Mason		All
Stobart	Honda CBR1000RR	33	(Northern Ireland) Michael Laverty		1–9, 11–13
Stobart	Honda CBR1000RR	99	(Northern Ireland) Jeremy McWilliams		1–3, 5, 13
Sendo Superbike Team	Kawasaki ZX-10R	4	(England) Steve Plater		1–6
Sendo Superbike Team	Kawasaki ZX-10R	10	(England) Jon Kirkham		1–6
Virgin Mobile Samsung	Yamaha YZF-R1	5	(England) Sean Emmett		1–5, 9–13
Virgin Mobile Samsung	Yamaha YZF-R1	5	(Australia) Daniel Stauffer		7
Virgin Mobile Samsung	Yamaha YZF-R1	8	(England) Tommy Hill		1–3, 5–13
Virgin Mobile Samsung	Yamaha YZF-R1	18	(England) James Haydon		6
Virgin Mobile Samsung	Yamaha YZF-R1	24	(England) Richard Wren		1–9, 11–13
Honda-racing.co.uk	Honda CBR1000RR	9	(England) Karl Harris		All
Dienza Performance*	Kawasaki ZX-10R	10	(England) Jon Kirkham		9–11 (Note: Jon Kirkham competed in the first friday practice session during round 11, before being replaced by David Johnson for the rest of the weekend.)
Dienza Performance*	Kawasaki ZX-10R	10	(Australia) David Johnson		11, 13
Dienza Performance*	Kawasaki ZX-10R	10	(France) Julien da Costa		12
Vivaldi Racing	Kawasaki ZX-10R	11	(England) Ben Wilson		All
Vivaldi Racing	Kawasaki ZX-10R	17	(England) Tristan Palmer		All
Vivaldi Racing	Kawasaki ZX-10R	88	(England) Scott Smart		7–10, 12–13
Hawk Kawasaki	Kawasaki ZX-10R	12	(Australia) Dean Thomas		All
Hawk Kawasaki	Kawasaki ZX-10R	75	(Australia) Glen Richards		All (Note: Glen Richards competed in the two Friday practice session during round 8, before being replaced by Lee Jackson for the rest of the weekend.)
Hawk Kawasaki	Kawasaki ZX-10R	75	(England) Lee Jackson		8
Vitrans Racing	Honda CBR1000RR	14	(Northern Ireland) John Laverty		1–8
Vitrans Racing	Honda CBR1000RR	14	(England) John McGuinness		9, 11–13
Jentin Racing	Yamaha YZF-R1	15	(England) Dean Ellison		1–4
Jentin Racing	Yamaha YZF-R1	15	(England) Luke Quigley		6–13
Jentin Racing	Yamaha YZF-R1	16	(England) Gareth Glynn	C	1–4, 6
Jentin Racing	Yamaha YZF-R1	16	(England) Richard Norris	C	8
BSD M/C Developments	Suzuki GSX-R1000	19	(England) Phil Giles	C	12–13
MAR Racing Kawasaki	Kawasaki ZX-10R	21	(England) James Edmeades	C	11
MAR Racing Kawasaki	Kawasaki ZX-10R	21	(England) Malcolm Ashley	C	1–10, 12–13
MP Racing Kawasaki	Kawasaki ZX-10R	22	(England) Michael Pensavalle	C	All
Team Nvidia	Yamaha YZF-R1	25	(England) Dennis Hobbs		1–4, 7–10, 12–13
Team Nvidia	Yamaha YZF-R1	25	(England) John Crockford		5
Team Nvidia	Yamaha YZF-R1	32	(South Africa) Sheridan Morais		6, 11
Carmasters Ltd	Suzuki GSX-R1000	26	(Australia) Chris Martin	C	All
AIM Racing	Yamaha YZF-R1	35	(England) Chris Burns		8–10
AIM Racing	Yamaha YZF-R1	35	(Scotland) Les Shand		11
AIM Racing	Yamaha YZF-R1	35	(England) Matt Llewellyn		12
AIM Racing	Yamaha YZF-R1	44	(England) John McGuinness		1–5, 7
AIM Racing	Kawasaki ZX-10R	44	(Northern Ireland) Marshall Neill		6
Airwaves Ducati	Ducati 999 F04	36	(England) James Haydon		0
Airwaves Ducati	Ducati 999 F04	36	(Spain) Gregorio Lavilla		All
Airwaves Ducati	Ducati 999 F04	91	(England) Leon Haslam		All
Team JJL Racing	Honda CBR1000RR	37	(England) Danny Beaumont	C	All
Slingshot Racing	Honda CBR1000RR	42	(England) Dean Ellison		6–13
Protech–Racing	Suzuki GSX-R1000	43	(England) Howie Mainwaring	C	12–13
Medd Racing	Kawasaki ZX-10R	48	(England) Nick Medd		All
Motor Sport Vision	Ducati 999 F04	52	(England) Gary Watts	C	11
Quay Garage Suzuki	Suzuki GSX-R1000	56	(England) James Buckingham	C	All (Note: James Buckingham competed in the first friday practice session for Quay Garage Suzuki during round 13, he was later switched to the Rizla Suzuki squad replacing John Reynolds for the rest of the weekends. With no replacement, Quay Garage Suzuki withdrew from the rest of the weekends.)
Red Bull Honda	Honda CBR1000RR	65	(Northern Ireland) Jonathan Rea		1–10, 12–13
PR Branson Honda	Honda CBR1000RR	68	(England) Steve Brogan	C	1–12
Hydrex Honda	Honda CBR1000RR	74	(England) Kieran Clarke		All
Hydrex Honda	Honda CBR1000RR	4	(England) Steve Plater		8–13
Nutt Travel/Johns Motors	Honda CBR1000RR	77	(Northern Ireland) Marty Nutt	C	All
MSS Discovery Racing	Kawasaki ZX-10R	86	(France) Julien Da Costa		1–4
Team Renegade KOJI	Honda CBR1000RR	155	(United States) Ben Bostrom		9

Icon	Class
C	Privateers Cup

Key
Regular Rider
Wildcard Rider
Replacement Rider

== Final championship standings ==
Points system
Position	**1st**	**2nd**	**3rd**	**4th**	**5th**	**6th**	**7th**	**8th**	**9th**	**10th**	**11th**	**12th**	**13th**	**14th**	**15th**
Race	25	20	16	13	11	10	9	8	7	6	5	4	3	2	1

Pos	Rider	Bike	Class	BHI (England)		THR (England)		MAL (England)		OUL (England)		MOP (Republic of Ireland)		CRO (England)		KNO (Scotland)		SNE (England)		SIL (England)		CAD (England)		OUL (England)		DON (England)		BHGP (England)		Pts
Pos	Rider	Bike	Class	R1	R2	R1	R2	R1	R2	R1	R2	R1	R2	R1	R2	R1	R2	R1	R2	R1	R2	R1	R2	R1	R2	R1	R2	R1	R2	Pts
1	(Spain) Gregorio Lavilla	Ducati		2	3	3	2	Ret	3	2	Ret	3	1	3	1	6	3	Ret	1	1	2	2	2	**2**	**2**	**1**	**1**	1	2	461
2	(Japan) Ryuichi Kiyonari	Honda		1	1	1	1	**Ret**	**DNS**			1	3	1	3	**1**	**1**	1	Ret	**8**	**1**	5	3	1	1	2	3	4	4	429
3	(England) Michael Rutter	Honda		4	2	**2**	**3**	1	1	**1**	**2**	2	5	**2**	**2**	2	2	5	3	15	4	8	Ret	10	Ret	6	4	6	8	371
4	(England) Leon Haslam	Ducati		**Ret**	**4**	4	7	3	5	4	1	Ret	2	6	Ret	5	5	**2**	**Ret**	2	3	**6**	**1**	4	4	3	2	2	1	350
5	(Australia) Glen Richards	Kawasaki		3	7	9	5	2	2	5	6	Ret	6	5	4	4	7	WD	WD	5	5	3	15	5	8	4	Ret	Ret	6	241
6	(Australia) Dean Thomas	Kawasaki		8	11	8	6	6	4	6	15	15	13	10	6	10	10	11	9	6	6	9	7	11	7	9	6	5	5	198
7	(England) Karl Harris	Honda		6	6	6	8	Ret	6	3	3	4	7	Ret	Ret	8	11	6	Ret	4	9	4	5	8	5	Ret	9	Ret	Ret	195
8	(England) Gary Mason	Honda		Ret	10	12	13	8	7	7	Ret	8	9	9	5	9	13	8	8	7	7	11	10	9	9	10	7	7	7	174
9	(England) John Reynolds	Suzuki		9	9	14	Ret	Ret	DNS					Ret	12	7	6	3	4	3	Ret	12	8	3	3	5	Ret	WD	WD	139
10	(Northern Ireland) Michael Laverty	Honda		15	15	15	17	7	9	13	10	6	4	4	10	3	4	Ret	2	DNS	DNS	WD	WD	DNS	DNS	Ret	10	11	11	129
11	(England) James Haydon	Suzuki								8	4	10	Ret			Ret	8	4	Ret	10	8	7	6	6	Ret	Ret	5	**3**	**Ret**	126
11	(England) James Haydon	Yamaha												8	Ret															126
12	(England) Tommy Hill	Yamaha		10	12	10	Ret	Ret	DNS			Ret	14	16	Ret	15	12	10	7	9	10	1	4	7	6	8	Ret	Ret	9	123
13	(England) Steve Plater	Honda																7	5	11	Ret	Ret	9	Ret	10	11	Ret	8	3	111
13	(England) Steve Plater	Kawasaki		Ret	Ret	13	10	Ret	DNS	11	7	14	11	11	7															111
14	(England) Scott Smart	Kawasaki														12	16	14	14	DNS	DNS	DNS	DNS			7	8	12	16	97
14	(England) Scott Smart	Suzuki		Ret	8	7	Ret	5	8	9	Ret	5	8	13	13															97
15	(England) Sean Emmett	Yamaha		5	5	5	4	4	10	Ret	11	7	Ret							DNS	Ret	13	Ret	13	11	13	Ret	Ret	15	94
16	(Northern Ireland) Jonathan Rea	Honda		13	18	16	12	14	14	12	9	**Ret**	**Ret**	7	Ret	Ret	9	WD	WD	12	11	Ret	Ret			19	11	10	10	64
17	(England) Ben Wilson	Kawasaki		11	13	17	15	Ret	11	15	14	13	15	12	DNS	14	18	9	6	Ret	Ret	14	Ret	14	Ret	12	13	13	12	62
18	(England) Kieran Clarke	Honda		Ret	16	Ret	11	Ret	15	10	8	11	Ret	Ret	8	Ret	14	Ret	Ret	Ret	15	16	13	19	17	Ret	Ret	14	18	41
19	(England) James Buckingham	Suzuki	C	16	17	11	Ret	15	DNS	16	20	21	19	17	14	11	19	18	21	16	12	10	11	12	12	15	20	WD	WD	39
19	(England) James Buckingham	Suzuki																										Ret	14	39
20	(Northern Ireland) Jeremy McWilliams	Honda		7	Ret	Ret	9	Ret	Ret			9	10															9	Ret	36
21	(England) Tristan Palmer	Kawasaki		14	22	Ret	Ret	13	13	18	13	20	18	Ret	15	13	15	13	20	14	14	Ret	12	15	16	20	Ret	Ret	Ret	28
22	(England) Danny Beaumont	Honda	C	12	Ret	Ret	19	9	DNS	WD	WD	22	17	18	Ret	Ret	DNS	Ret	11	Ret	Ret	15	18	DNS	DNS	17	16	Ret	13	20
23	(England) Steve Brogan	Honda	C	27	Ret	20	14	10	16	19	Ret	23	20	15	19	Ret	23	19	15	17	DNS	Ret	DNS	Ret	14	Ret	Ret			19
24	(France) Julien Da Costa	Kawasaki		20	19	Ret	16	Ret	DNS	Ret	5															14	Ret			13
25	(England) John McGuinness	Honda																		Ret	DNS			16	15	DNS	DNS	Ret	Ret	12
25	(England) John McGuinness	Yamaha		17	14	19	20	11	12	Ret	DNS	19	Ret			DNS	Ret													12
26	(England) Jon Kirkham	Kawasaki		21	20	18	18	16	17	17	12	12	12	DNS	DNS					Ret	17	Ret	DNS	WD	WD					12
27	(England) Richard Wren	Yamaha		24	Ret	WD	WD	DNS	DNS	22	21	26	22	20	16	18	21	12	12	DNS	DNS			17	13	Ret	19	Ret	Ret	11
28	(England) Dennis Hobbs	Yamaha		19	23	Ret	24	12	DNS	WD	WD					Ret	17	15	Ret	13	13	DNS	DNS			Ret	Ret	Ret	DNS	11
29	(Northern Ireland) John Laverty	Honda		18	Ret	Ret	Ret	19	18	14	Ret	17	16	Ret	10	16	20	Ret	19											8
30	(Australia) Chris Martin	Suzuki	C	25	24	23	22	17	19	WD	WD	16	25	21	11	23	25	17	18	20	DNS	18	14	24	20	16	18	20	23	7
31	(England) Chris Burns	Yamaha																Ret	10	DNS	Ret	Ret	DNS							6
32	(England) Dean Ellison	Honda												Ret	Ret	19	22	Ret	DNS	DNS	16	19	16	Ret	DNS	18	12	DNS	22	4
32	(England) Dean Ellison	Yamaha		22	26	21	23	20	DNS	Ret	Ret																			4
33	(Northern Ireland) Marty Nutt	Honda	C	Ret	21	Ret	21	18	20	20	19	18	24	14	Ret	17	Ret	Ret	17	18	Ret	21	21	20	18	23	14	16	Ret	4
34	(England) Lee Jackson	Kawasaki																Ret	13											3
35	(England) Luke Quigley	Yamaha												Ret	19	20	24	16	16	Ret	Ret	17	17	18	19	21	15	19	20	1
36	(Australia) David Johnson	Kawasaki																						21	21			15	17	1
	(England) Malcolm Ashley	Kawasaki	C	28	27	DNQ	DNQ	DNS	DNS	21	18	25	23	Ret	17	21	26	21	22	19	18	20	20			25	17	17	19	0
	(England) Nick Medd	Kawasaki		29	Ret	Ret	Ret	DNS	DNS	25	17	24	Ret	23	DNS	22	28	20	Ret	Ret	Ret	22	DNS	Ret	DNS	DNQ	DNQ	DNS	DNS	0
	(England) Phil Giles	Suzuki	C																							24	DNS	18	21	0
	(South Africa) Sheridan Morais	Yamaha												22	18									25	22					0
	(England) Michael Pensavalle	Kawasaki	C	26	25	24	26	Ret	DNS	23	22	Ret	21	Ret	20	Ret	27	Ret	23	Ret	Ret	23	19	22	24	26	Ret	Ret	Ret	0
	(Northern Ireland) Marshall Neill	Yamaha												19	Ret															0
	(England) Gareth Glynn	Yamaha	C	23	Ret	22	25	21	Ret	24	Ret			Ret	DNS															0
	(England) Matt Llewellyn	Yamaha																								22	Ret			0
	(Scotland) Les Shand	Yamaha																						23	23					0
	(England) James Edmeades	Kawasaki	C																					Ret	25					0
	(England) Gary Watts	Ducati	C																					26	26					0
	(England) Richard Norris	Yamaha	C															Ret	Ret											0
	(England) John Crockford	Yamaha										Ret	Ret																	0
	(United States) Ben Bostrom	Honda																		DNS	DNS									
	(Australia) Daniel Stauffer	Yamaha														DNS	DNS													
	(England) Howie Mainwaring	Suzuki	C																							DNQ	DNQ	WD	WD	

Colour	Result
Gold	Winner
Silver	Second place
Bronze	Third place
Green	Points classification
Blue	Non-points classification
Blue	Non-classified finish (NC)
Purple	Retired, not classified (Ret)
Red	Did not qualify (DNQ)
Red	Did not pre-qualify (DNPQ)
Black	Disqualified (DSQ)
White	Did not start (DNS)
White	Withdrew (WD)
White	Race cancelled (C)
Blank	Did not practice (DNP)
Blank	Did not arrive (DNA)
Blank	Excluded (EX)

**Bold** - Pole
Italics - Fastest Lap

Icon	Class
**C**	Privateers Cup

=== Final Constructors Standings ===
1	(Japan) Honda	558
2	(Italy) Ducati	533
3	(Japan) Kawasaki	295
4	(Japan) Suzuki	254
5	(Japan) Yamaha	187

== Final Supersport championship standings (top 10) ==
Pos	Rider	Team	Pts	Ref
1	(England) Leon Camier	Padgetts Honda	202	
2	(England) Craig Jones	Northpoint Honda	189	
3	(Scotland) Stuart Easton	JHP Ducati	161	
4	(England) Cal Crutchlow	Northpoint Honda	161	
5	(Spain) Pere Riba	MSS Discovery Kawasaki	155	
6	(England) Tom Sykes	TAS Suzuki	119	
7	(England) Jamie Robinson	JR Motosport Honda	112	
8	(England) Jay Vincent	Padgetts Honda	91	
9	(Northern Ireland) Eugene Laverty	Red Bull Honda	84	
10	(England) Simon Andrews	TAS Suzuki	67	
