= 2009 Misano Superbike World Championship round =

(San Marino) 2009 Misano Superbike World Championship round
Round details
- Round 8 of 14 rounds in the 2009 Superbike World Championship. and Round 8 of 14 rounds in the 2009 Supersport World Championship.
- Date: June 21, 2009
- Location: Misano
- Course: Permanent racing facility 4.226 km (2.626 mi)

Superbike World Championship
Pole position
(Czech Republic) Jakub Smrž
1:35.435
Fastest lap race 1	Fastest lap race 2
(Czech Republic) Jakub Smrž	(Japan) Noriyuki Haga
1:38.679	1:37.135

Supersport World Championship
Pole position
(Italy) Michele Pirro
1:40.498
Fastest lap
(United Kingdom) Cal Crutchlow
1:38.868

The 2009 Misano Superbike World Championship round was the eighth round of the 2009 Superbike World Championship season. It took place on the weekend of June 19–21, 2009 at the Misano Adriatico circuit.

== Results ==
=== Superbike race 1 ===
Pos	No	Rider	Bike	Laps	Time	Grid	Points
1	19	(United States) Ben Spies	Yamaha YZF-R1	24	45:02.773	3	25
2	67	(United Kingdom) Shane Byrne	Ducati 1098R	24	+7.931	5	20
3	84	(Italy) Michel Fabrizio	Ducati 1098R	24	+11.836	4	16
4	96	(Czech Republic) Jakub Smrž	Ducati 1098R	24	+11.886	1	13
5	41	(Japan) Noriyuki Haga	Ducati 1098R	24	+31.670	6	11
6	71	(Japan) Yukio Kagayama	Suzuki GSX-R1000 K9	24	+33.241	13	10
7	65	(United Kingdom) Jonathan Rea	Honda CBR1000RR	24	+35.772	2	9
8	66	(United Kingdom) Tom Sykes	Yamaha YZF-R1	24	+41.931	14	8
9	56	(Japan) Shinya Nakano	Aprilia RSV 4	24	+51.507	12	7
10	14	(France) Matthieu Lagrive	Honda CBR1000RR	24	+59.921	22	6
11	7	(Spain) Carlos Checa	Honda CBR1000RR	24	+1:04.285	7	5
12	91	(United Kingdom) Leon Haslam	Honda CBR1000RR	24	+1:04.313	10	4
13	3	(Italy) Max Biaggi	Aprilia RSV 4	24	+1:19.822	9	3
14	111	(Spain) Ruben Xaus	BMW S1000RR	24	+1:22.412	18	2
15	53	(Italy) Alessandro Polita	Suzuki GSX-R1000 K9	24	+1:31.635	28	1
16	2	(United States) Jamie Hacking	Kawasaki ZX-10R	24	+1:39.830	20	
17	23	(Australia) Broc Parkes	Kawasaki ZX-10R	24	+1:42.964	19	
18	10	(Spain) Fonsi Nieto	Suzuki GSX-R1000 K9	24	+1:43.303	11	
19	57	(Italy) Lorenzo Lanzi	Ducati 1098R	23	+1 Lap	16	
20	77	(Italy) Vittorio Iannuzzo	Honda CBR1000RR	23	+1 Lap	27	
21	94	(Spain) David Checa	Yamaha YZF-R1	23	+1 Lap	25	
22	36	(Spain) Gregorio Lavilla	Ducati 1098R	23	+1 Lap	17	
23	25	(Spain) David Salom	Kawasaki ZX-10R	23	+1 Lap	21	
NC	88	(Austria) Roland Resch	Suzuki GSX-R1000 K9	23	+1 Lap	29	
Ret	99	(Italy) Luca Scassa	Kawasaki ZX-10R	20	Retirement	23	
Ret	15	(Italy) Matteo Baiocco	Kawasaki ZX-10R	15	Mechanical	24	
Ret	9	(Japan) Ryuichi Kiyonari	Honda CBR1000RR	0	Retirement	8	
Ret	11	(Australia) Troy Corser	BMW S1000RR	0	Accident	15	
DNS	121	(United States) John Hopkins	Honda CBR1000RR		Not started	26	

=== Superbike race 2 ===
Pos	No	Rider	Bike	Laps	Time	Grid	Points
1	65	(United Kingdom) Jonathan Rea	Honda CBR1000RR	24	39:11.204	2	25
2	84	(Italy) Michel Fabrizio	Ducati 1098R	24	+0.063	4	20
3	41	(Japan) Noriyuki Haga	Ducati 1098R	24	+0.457	6	16
4	96	(Czech Republic) Jakub Smrž	Ducati 1098R	24	+3.635	1	13
5	7	(Spain) Carlos Checa	Honda CBR1000RR	24	+4.460	7	11
6	67	(United Kingdom) Shane Byrne	Ducati 1098R	24	+4.538	5	10
7	66	(United Kingdom) Tom Sykes	Yamaha YZF-R1	24	+12.679	14	9
8	91	(United Kingdom) Leon Haslam	Honda CBR1000RR	24	+12.763	10	8
9	19	(United States) Ben Spies	Yamaha YZF-R1	24	+13.237	3	7
10	3	(Italy) Max Biaggi	Aprilia RSV 4	24	+14.412	9	6
11	71	(Japan) Yukio Kagayama	Suzuki GSX-R1000 K9	24	+20.073	13	5
12	10	(Spain) Fonsi Nieto	Suzuki GSX-R1000 K9	24	+20.239	11	4
13	56	(Japan) Shinya Nakano	Aprilia RSV 4	24	+22.351	12	3
14	9	(Japan) Ryuichi Kiyonari	Honda CBR1000RR	24	+24.547	8	2
15	36	(Spain) Gregorio Lavilla	Ducati 1098R	24	+24.696	17	1
16	111	(Spain) Ruben Xaus	BMW S1000RR	24	+25.615	18	
17	23	(Australia) Broc Parkes	Kawasaki ZX-10R	24	+31.887	19	
18	57	(Italy) Lorenzo Lanzi	Ducati 1098R	24	+34.751	16	
19	11	(Australia) Troy Corser	BMW S1000RR	24	+38.061	15	
20	99	(Italy) Luca Scassa	Kawasaki ZX-10R	24	+47.717	23	
21	14	(France) Matthieu Lagrive	Honda CBR1000RR	24	+48.973	22	
22	2	(United States) Jamie Hacking	Kawasaki ZX-10R	24	+51.027	20	
23	53	(Italy) Alessandro Polita	Suzuki GSX-R1000 K9	24	+52.526	28	
24	77	(Italy) Vittorio Iannuzzo	Honda CBR1000RR	24	+57.589	27	
25	88	(Austria) Roland Resch	Suzuki GSX-R1000 K9	24	+1'36.359	29	
Ret	25	(Spain) David Salom	Kawasaki ZX-10R	19	Retirement	21	
Ret	94	(Spain) David Checa	Yamaha YZF-R1	15	Retirement	25	
Ret	15	(Italy) Matteo Baiocco	Kawasaki ZX-10R	5	Mechanical	24	
DNS	121	(United States) John Hopkins	Honda CBR1000RR		Not started	26	

=== Supersport race ===
The Supersport race was stopped after 8 laps, because of an accident that spilled oil on the track. It was later restarted, with the final result being the aggregate of the two heats.

Pos	No	Rider	Bike	Laps	Time	Grid	Points
1	35	(United Kingdom) Cal Crutchlow	Yamaha YZF-R6	22	36:51.032	2	25
2	50	(Republic of Ireland) Eugene Laverty	Honda CBR600RR	22	+0.263	8	20
3	55	(Italy) Massimo Roccoli	Honda CBR600RR	22	+16.289	3	16
4	26	(Spain) Joan Lascorz	Kawasaki ZX-6R	22	+20.894	10	13
5	8	(Australia) Mark Aitchison	Honda CBR600RR	22	+21.615	7	11
6	21	(Japan) Katsuaki Fujiwara	Kawasaki ZX-6R	22	+22.272	4	10
7	13	(Australia) Anthony West	Honda CBR600RR	22	+25.099	6	9
8	99	(France) Fabien Foret	Yamaha YZF-R6	22	+26.374	18	8
9	69	(Italy) Gianluca Nannelli	Triumph Daytona 675	22	+34.558	5	7
10	117	(Portugal) Miguel Praia	Honda CBR600RR	22	+49.578	16	6
11	105	(Italy) Gianluca Vizziello	Honda CBR600RR	22	+51.446	14	5
12	40	(Italy) Flavio Gentile	Honda CBR600RR	22	+54.391	21	4
13	9	(Italy) Danilo dell'Omo	Honda CBR600RR	22	+1:00.324	12	3
14	28	(Netherlands) Arie Vos	Honda CBR600RR	22	+1:11.594	19	2
15	88	(Spain) Yannick Guerra	Yamaha YZF-R6	22	+1:43.088	26	1
16	22	(Romania) Robert Muresan	Triumph Daytona 675	20	+2 Laps	28	
Ret	51	(Italy) Michele Pirro	Yamaha YZF-R6	16	Mechanical	1	
Ret	24	(Australia) Garry McCoy	Triumph Daytona 675	11	Mechanical	13	
Ret	54	(Turkey) Kenan Sofuoglu	Honda CBR600RR	8	Not classified on heat 1	11	
Ret	77	(Netherlands) Barry Veneman	Honda CBR600RR	8	Accident	20	
Ret	5	(Indonesia) Doni Tata Pradita	Yamaha YZF-R6	8	Accident	24	
Ret	25	(United Kingdom) Michael Laverty	Honda CBR600RR	8	Accident	23	
Ret	96	(Czech Republic) Matej Smrž	Triumph Daytona 675	8	Retirement	27	
Ret	7	(Czech Republic) Patrik Vostárek	Honda CBR600RR	5	Accident	25	
Ret	127	(Denmark) Robbin Harms	Honda CBR600RR	4	Retirement	17	
Ret	101	(United Kingdom) Kev Coghlan	Yamaha YZF-R6	4	Accident	29	
Ret	30	(Germany) Jesco Günther	Honda CBR600RR	3	Mechanical	15	
Ret	44	(Italy) Alessandro Brannetti	Yamaha YZF-R6	3	Mechanical	22	
Ret	1	(Australia) Andrew Pitt	Honda CBR600RR	2	Accident	9	

== Superstock 1000 race classification ==
The race was stopped at the first lap following an incident involving Domenico Colucci and Pere Tutusaus, the race was later restarted and shortened into 9 laps from the original 14 laps.

Pos.	No.	Rider	Bike	Laps	Time/Retired	Grid	Points
1	1`	(France) Maxime Berger	Honda CBR1000RR	9	15:07.296	2	25
2	19	(Belgium) Xavier Simeon	Ducati 1098R	9	+5.596	1	20
3	20	(France) Sylvain Barrier	Yamaha YZF-R1	9	+8.647	6	16
4	71	(Italy) Claudio Corti	Suzuki GSX-R1000 K9	9	+8.907	7	13
5	119	(Italy) Michele Magnoni	Yamaha YZF-R1	9	+9.066	5	11
6	34	(Italy) Davide Giugliano	MV Agusta F4 312 R	9	+12.028	9	10
7	112	(Spain) Javier Forés	Kawasaki ZX-10R	9	+12.361	11	9
8	29	(Italy) Daniele Beretta	Ducati 1098R	9	+13.509	15	8
9	65	(France) Loris Baz	Yamaha YZF-R1	9	+13.609	8	7
10	69	(Czech Republic) Ondřej Ježek	Honda CBR1000RR	9	+16.051	14	6
11	51	(Spain) Santiago Barragán	Honda CBR1000RR	9	+16.344	4	5
12	7	(Austria) René Mähr	Suzuki GSX-R1000 K9	9	+20.867	13	4
13	30	(Switzerland) Michaël Savary	Honda CBR1000RR	9	+21.160	20	3
14	8	(Italy) Andrea Antonelli	Yamaha YZF-R1	9	+23.502	12	2
15	86	(France) Loïc Napoleone	Suzuki GSX-R1000 K9	9	+23.735	10	1
16	2	(Italy) Luca Morelli	Kawasaki ZX-10R	9	+24.152	16	
17	25	(United Kingdom) Gregg Black	Yamaha YZF-R1	9	+24.318	26	
18	53	(Germany) Dominic Lammert	Suzuki GSX-R1000 K9	9	+26.295	17	
19	12	(Italy) Nico Vivarelli	Honda CBR1000RR	9	+28.466	22	
20	91	(Sweden) Hampus Johansson	Yamaha YZF-R1	9	+30.508	27	
21	61	(France) Franck Millet	Honda CBR1000RR	9	+31.069	25	
22	107	(Italy) Niccolò Rosso	Yamaha YZF-R1	9	+32.389	30	
23	77	(United Kingdom) Barry Burrell	Honda CBR1000RR	9	+32.457	24	
24	14	(Italy) Federico Biaggi	Aprilia RSV4 Factory	9	+36.297	32	
25	22	(United Kingdom) Alex Lowes	MV Agusta F4 312 R	9	+36.821	23	
26	23	(Italy) Federico Sandi	Aprilia RSV4 Factory	9	+37.409	29	
27	9	(Italy) Matteo Guarino	Honda CBR1000RR	9	+39.417	34	
28	131	(Italy) Patrizio Valsecchi	Yamaha YZF-R1	9	+39.830	33	
29	63	(Sweden) Per Björk	Honda CBR1000RR	9	+40.893	31	
30	36	(Brazil) Philippe Thiriet	Honda CBR1000RR	9	+49.386	35	
31	72	(France) Nicolas Pouhair	Yamaha YZF-R1	9	+49.698	37	
32	64	(Brazil) Danilo Andric	Yamaha YZF-R1	9	+56.229	39	
33	11	(Spain) Pere Tutusaus	KTM RC8 R	9	+58.331	38	
Ret	111	(Spain) Ismael Ortega	Kawasaki ZX-10R	8	Accident	19	
Ret	16	(Netherlands) Raymond Schouten	Yamaha YZF-R1	3	Retirement	18	
Ret	117	(Italy) Denis Sacchetti	KTM RC8 R	3	Retirement	28	
Ret	45	(Italy) Luca Verdini	Yamaha YZF-R1	1	Accident	21	
Ret	93	(France) Mathieu Lussiana	Yamaha YZF-R1	1	Retirement	36	
DNS	89	(Italy) Domenico Colucci	Ducati 1098R	0	Accident (Original attempt)	3	
DNS	84	(Italy) Fabio Massei	Yamaha YZF-R1		Did not start		
DNS	66	(Poland) Mateusz Stoklosa	Honda CBR1000RR		Did not start		

== Superstock 600 race classification ==
Pos.	No.	Rider	Bike	Laps	Time/Retired	Grid	Points
1	9	(Italy) Danilo Petrucci	Yamaha YZF-R6	10	17:13.058	2	25
2	5	(Italy) Marco Bussolotti	Yamaha YZF-R6	10	+0.103	3	20
3	55	(Belgium) Vincent Lonbois	Yamaha YZF-R6	10	+0.381	6	16
4	47	(Italy) Eddi La Marra	Honda CBR600RR	10	+3.560	7	13
5	11	(France) Jérémy Guarnoni	Yamaha YZF-R6	10	+3.933	5	11
6	73	(Italy) Andrea Boscoscuro	Yamaha YZF-R6	10	+7.110	8	10
7	40	(Italy) Roberto Tamburini	Yamaha YZF-R6	10	+7.494	9	9
8	4	(United Kingdom) Gino Rea	Honda CBR600RR	10	+7.523	10	8
9	89	(Austria) Stefan Kerschbaumer	Yamaha YZF-R6	10	+17.406	13	7
10	7	(France) Baptiste Guittet	Honda CBR600RR	10	+17.493	15	6
11	44	(Italy) Davide Fanelli	Yamaha YZF-R6	10	+17.559	11	5
12	25	(Italy) Roberto Farinelli	Yamaha YZF-R6	10	+17.738	17	4
13	19	(Italy) Nico Morelli	Yamaha YZF-R6	10	+18.222	18	3
14	13	(Italy) Dino Lombardi	Yamaha YZF-R6	10	+23.446	16	2
15	12	(Italy) Riccardo Cecchini	Honda CBR600RR	10	+39.051	22	1
16	10	(Spain) Nacho Calero	Yamaha YZF-R6	10	+40.306	20	
17	132	(Italy) Daniele Manfrinati	Honda CBR600RR	10	+46.684	19	
18	36	(Poland) Andrzej Chmielewski	Yamaha YZF-R6	10	+50.527	14	
19	26	(Romania) Mircea Vrăjitoru	Yamaha YZF-R6	10	+51.007	23	
20	81	(Czech Republic) David Látr	Honda CBR600RR	10	+1:13.245	24	
21	30	(Romania) Bogdan Vrăjitoru	Yamaha YZF-R6	9	+1 lap	25	
Ret	133	(Italy) Giuliano Gregorini	Yamaha YZF-R6	8	Accident	4	
Ret	72	(Norway) Fredrik Karlsen	Yamaha YZF-R6	4	Accident	12	
Ret	28	(Italy) Ferruccio Lamborghini	Yamaha YZF-R6	3	Accident	1	
Ret	23	(Switzerland) Christian Von Gunten	Suzuki GSX-R600	2	Retirement	21	
