= Tom Sykes =

British motorcycle racer (born 1985)

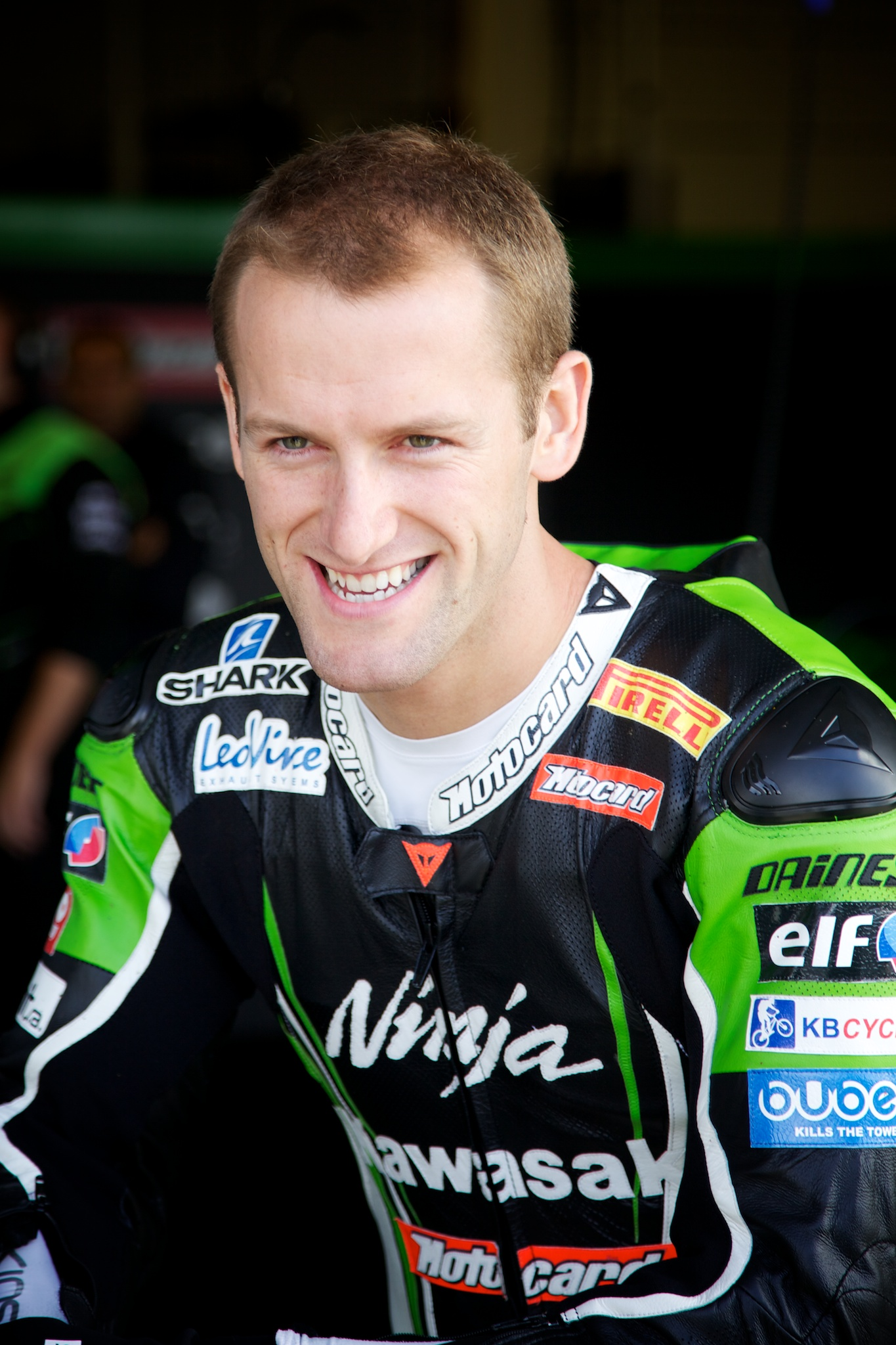
- Sykes at Silverstone, World Superbike in 2012
- Born: Thomas Edward Sykes; 19 August 1985 (age 41); Huddersfield, West Yorkshire, England
- Current team: ROKiT BMW Motorrad WorldSBK Team
- Bike number: 66
Motorcycle racing career statistics
Superbike World Championship
Active years	2008–2021, 2023
Manufacturers	Suzuki, Yamaha, Kawasaki, BMW
Championships	1 (2013)
2021 championship position	11th (184 pts)
Starts / Wins / Podiums / Poles / F. laps / Points; 364 / 34 / 114 / 51 / 39 / 3704.5
British Superbike Championship
Active years	2007–2010, 2022, 2025
Manufacturers	Honda, Suzuki, Kawasaki, Ducati, Aprilia
Championships	0
2022 championship position	12th (187 pts)
Starts / Wins / Podiums / Poles / F. laps / Points; 88 / 7 / 18 / 0 / 0 / 843

Thomas Edward Sykes (born 19 August 1985) is a professional motorcycle racer who first competed in World Superbike Championship during 2008. For the 2022 season, Sykes rejoined his former team Paul Bird Motorsport riding a Ducati in British Superbikes, finishing in 12th place.

Following his fourth place world superbike championship finish in 2018, Sykes left the Kawasaki factory racing team and raced BMWs for Shaun Muir Racing from 2019, until being dropped by BMW Motorsport during the 2021 season with an announcement that Scott Redding had been contracted for 2022. For 2023, he raced in world superbikes for a satellite Kawasaki team.

Sykes also holds World Superbike Championship records for the most career pole positions and ranks second to Troy Corser in career race starts. When reviewing his World Superbike statistics in early 2022, UK publication Motorcycle News quoted 34 wins, 114 podiums and 51 pole positions from 349 races.

In 2007, Sykes gained his first ride in British Superbikes, riding a Stobart Vent-Axia Honda; Sykes finished in sixth position in the championship in his rookie year. Following this success he was signed by the Rizla Suzuki team for the 2008 season; he went on to finish fourth in the championship as well as winning the Race of the Year, and making wildcard World Superbike appearances at Brands Hatch & Donington Park, where he impressed strongly, helping him gain a World Superbike ride at Yamaha Motor Italia for the 2009 season. For 2010, he raced a PBM Racing Kawasaki in the series. He won his first SBK title in 2013 for Kawasaki.

== Early life ==
Skyes was born 19 August 1985 in Huddersfield, West Yorkshire.

== Career ==
=== Early career ===
Sykes credits his racing career to his grandfather Peter Brook who loaned him his 600cc Ninja for a race weekend and financing his start. Sykes raced in the Supersport division of the British Superbike championship from 2003 to 2006, finishing eighth, fifth, sixth, and as runner-up to Cal Crutchlow in 2006.

=== British Superbike Championship (2007–2008) ===
2007 was Sykes' first season in the British Superbike championship, riding for the Stobart Vent-Axia Honda team alongside 2003 series champion Shane Byrne. He finished 18 of the first 20 rounds, including a pair of fourth places at Snetterton. Second on the grid at Oulton Park, and pole at Donington Park. Sykes took his first two podiums at the Croft Circuit, to move up to sixth in the championship, immediately behind Byrne, and immediately ahead of Leon Camier on another Honda.

Shortly after joining the Rizla Suzuki team for 2008, Sykes was seen testing a Suzuki MotoGP bike. Sykes started the 2008 with a sixth and an eighth at Thruxton (The first races were there as the season opener at Brands Hatch was snowed off). He took pole position at Oulton Park, but crashed at the aborted start of race 1, before finishing fifth on the restart . He led race 2 until being taken out by Leon Haslam, who was excluded for the move. Sykes continued to finish towards the front of the field consistently scoring podiums at Brands Hatch (second), Donington Park (third) and Snetterton (third) all in the first of the two races. It was at Oulton Park where he scored his first two victories, taking the lead from James Ellison late in race 1 but leading most of race 2. He followed that up with a third straight win at Knockhill in the first race, and collected podiums for the rest of the championship. Sykes finished fourth in the championship with 316 points, two points behind Cal Crutchlow.

=== Superbike World Championship ===
==== 2008–2021 ====
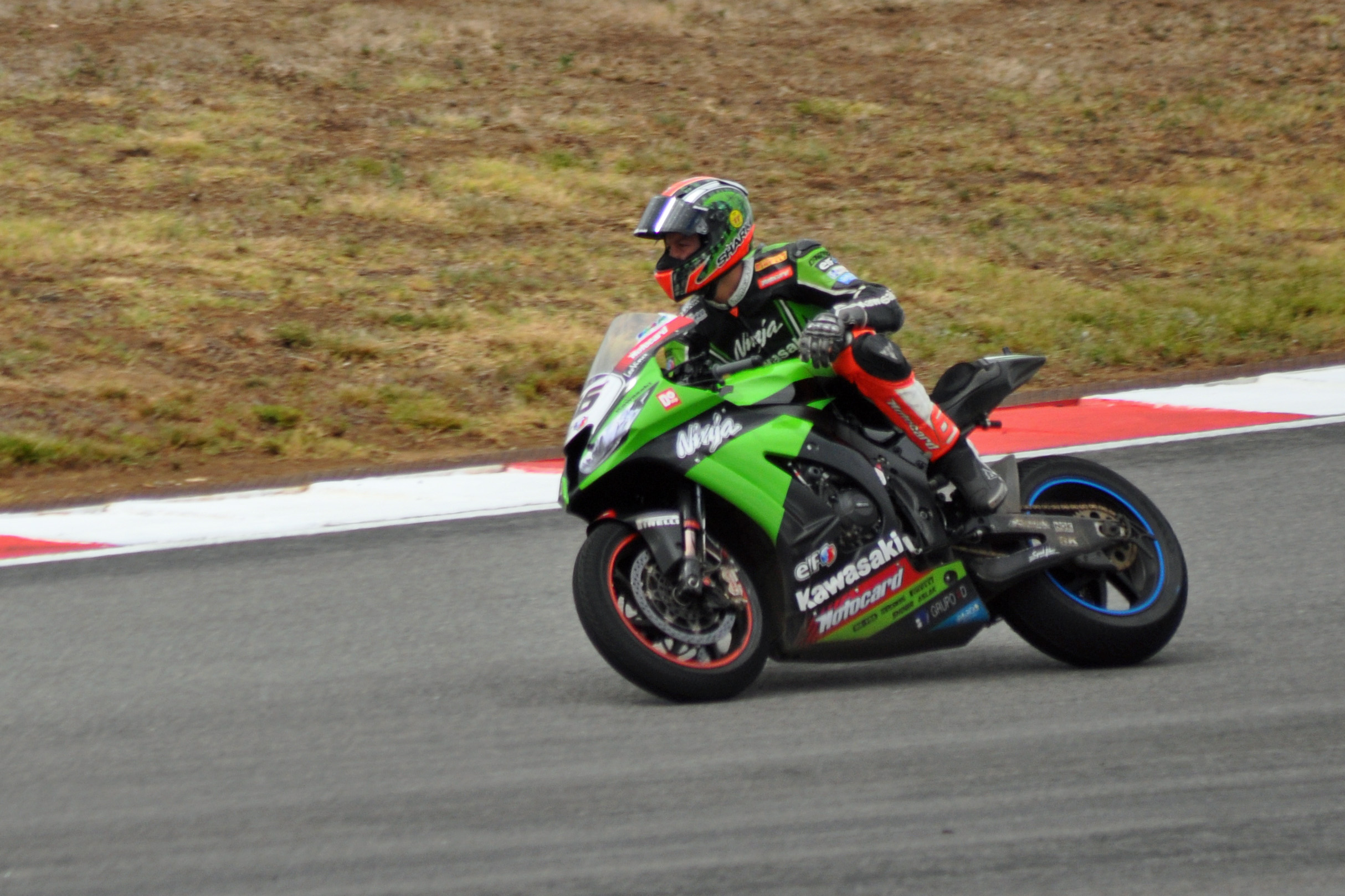
Sykes at Autódromo Internacional do Algarve in 2012

Sykes made his World Superbike Championship debut at Brands Hatch as a wildcard, impressing by qualifying sixth (ahead of three works Suzukis with more powerful engines, including title contender Max Neukirchner). He retired from a strong position in race 1 due to a hole in the radiator by rocks thrown up by Max Biaggi's Sterilgarda Ducati machine, but came back to finish sixth in race 2. He gained a second wildcard meeting at Donington Park in changeable conditions, where he proved even stronger. He again qualified on the second row, but got a flying start in race one and had a comfortable lead when the race was red-flagged due to oil from Noriyuki Haga's Yamaha. Knowing he had to finish within four seconds of Troy Bayliss to win on aggregate, Sykes lead early in race two, before easing off after seeing a white flag with a red cross, which typically means a slippery surface (often with the yellow and red striped oil flag), but racing in British Superbike Championship races, the flag neutralises the race under a full-course caution period with safety car deployment, so Sykes and Leon Haslam both eased up, anticipating neutralisation, but the time lost here proved costly, as Sykes failed to stay close enough to Bayliss, finishing second behind the three-time series champion. He was less competitive in race two, but his reputation had still been boosted.

On 11 September 2008, Sykes signed a contract with the Yamaha Motor Italia World Superbike team for the 2009 season, with an option to extend that contract until 2010 depending on results. Sykes had an average year finishing mostly mid-pack, while his teammate Ben Spies was at the front of the field. This led to Yamaha not offering Sykes a second year, instead hiring fellow Brits James Toseland and Cal Crutchlow.

Sykes signed for the Paul Bird Motorsport Kawasaki team for 2010, as had been rumoured, enabling him to stay in the World Superbike class. Sykes said

“It’s going to be a challenge, but I’m looking forward to it. I believe that from what is in place in the team we’re going to be able to do a good job.”

The Kawasaki was relatively uncompetitive in 2010, but Sykes managed a strong fifth place at Monza. He was the team leader for much of the year, with the more experienced Chris Vermeulen struggling following a knee injury sustained at the first round at Phillip Island. Despite speculation as to his future with the team, Sykes flew to Japan to help test the ZX-10R, the bike the team will use for 2011. He made a wildcard appearance with the team in the British Superbike Championship at Brands Hatch.

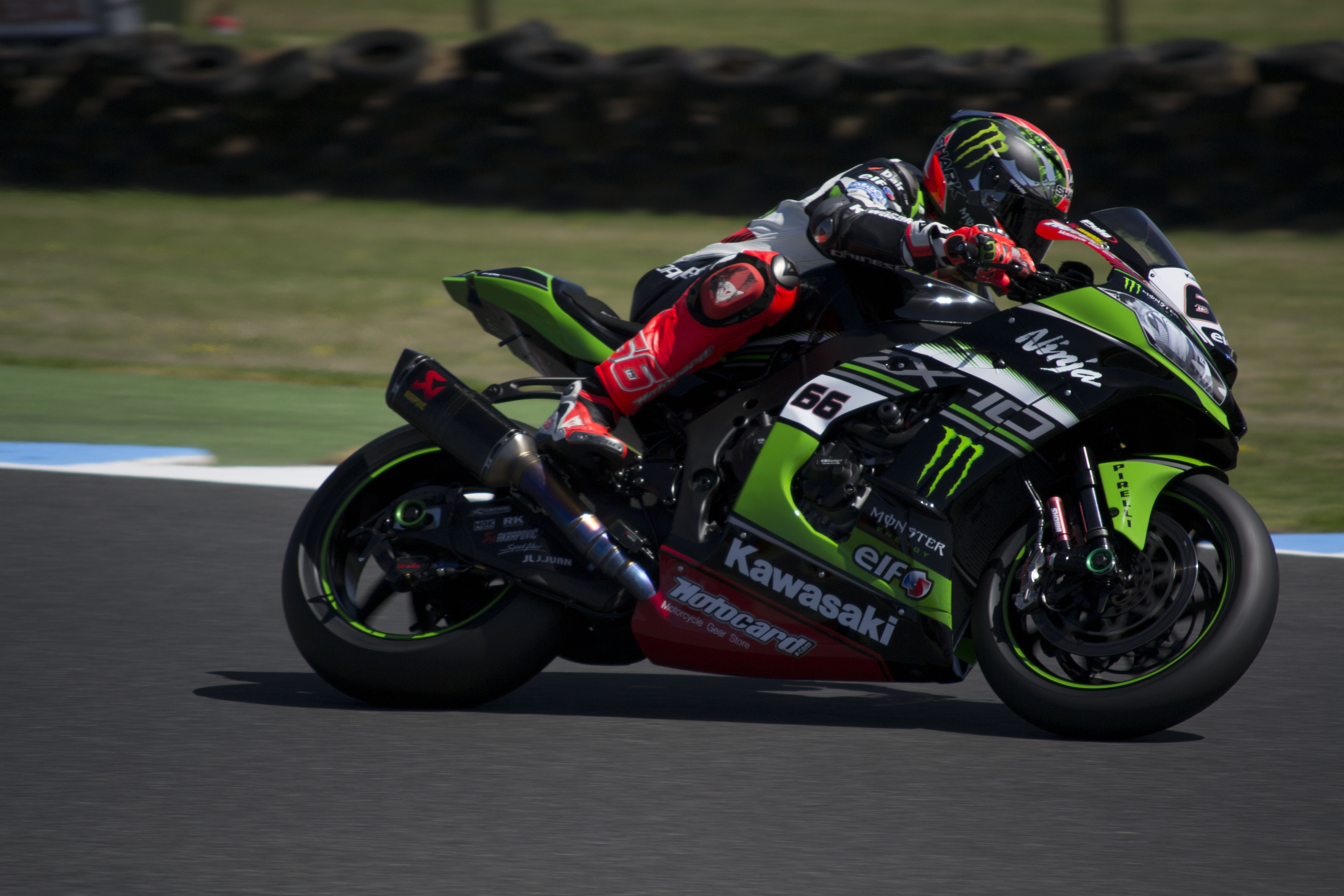
Sykes at the Phillip Island 2017 Australian World Superbike round

On the final weekend of the 2010 World Superbike Championship season, Sykes confirmed that he had signed a one-year contract with Kawasaki that would see him ride in the 2011 Superbike World Championship season.

Sykes crashed in the chicane at Donington Park shortly after he passed an Aprilia and moved up to fourth place and he was taken out of the race while his teammates managed mid-placings. He finished close to last in race 2, but Lascorz made sixth. In the following race at the Nürburgring however, he gained his first victory in Race 2.

In the following season, Sykes became runner-up, missing the title only by half a point against Max Biaggi.

Sykes was crowned the 2013 World Superbike Champion after securing the third-place finish he needed to secure a popular title victory at Jerez, while Eugene Laverty took a dramatic last corner victory over Marco Melandri.

On 21 June 2014, Sykes captured his 21st career Superpole at Italy's Misano World Circuit for round seven of the series.

By the end of the 2018 season, Sykes and the Kawasaki Racing Team mutually agreed to end their sporting relationship.

==== Return (2023) ====
After a year of absence, Sykes signed a contract with Puccetti Kawasaki Racing. He would compete at Superbike World Championship in 2023.

== Career statistics ==
=== All-time statistics ===
Series	Years	Races	Poles	Podiums	**Wins**	**2nd place**	**3rd place**	Fastest laps	Titles	Points
British Superbike Championship	^{2007–2008, 2010, 2022, 2025}	88	2	20	7	6	7	0	0	843
Superbike World Championship	^{2009−2021, 2023}	359	51	114	34	38	42	39	1	3701.5
Total		445	53	132	41	44	49	39	1	4544.5

=== British Supersport Championship ===
==== Races by year ====
(key)

Year	Class	Bike	SIL (England)	BHI (England)	SNE (England)	OUL (England)	MON (Republic of Ireland)	SNE (England)	BHGP (England)	KNO (Scotland)	MAL (England)	CRO (England)	CAD (England)	OUL (England)	DON (England)	Pos	Pts	Ref
2004	BSS	Suzuki	10	Ret	7	14	4	10	Ret	5	9	4	2	2	3	5th	123	

Year	Class	Biks	BHI (England)	THR (England)	MAL (England)	OUL (England)	MON (Republic of Ireland)	CRO (England)	KNO (Scotland)	SNE (England)	SIL (England)	CAD (England)	OUL (England)	DON (England)	BHGP (England)	Pos	Pts	Ref
2005	BSS	Suzuki	Ret	9	2	1	1	4					3	Ret	4	5th	119	

Year	Class	Bike	BHI (England)	DON (England)	THR (England)	OUL (England)	MON (Republic of Ireland)	MAL (England)	SNE (England)	KNO (Scotland)	OUL (England)	CRO (England)	CAD (England)	SIL (England)	BHGP (England)	Pos	Pts	Ref
2006	BSS	Suzuki	9	5	6	3	C	3	3	Ret	2	2	2	2	3	2nd	172	

=== British Superbike Championship ===
==== Races by year ====
(key)

Year	Class	Bike	BHGP (England)		THR (England)		SIL (England)		OUL (England)		SNE (England)		MOP (Republic of Ireland)		KNO (Scotland)		OUL (England)		MAL (England)		CRO (England)		CAD (England)		DON (England)		BHI (England)		Pos	Pts	Ref
Year	Class	Bike	R1	R2	R1	R2	R1	R2	R1	R2	R1	R2	R1	R2	R1	R2	R1	R2	R1	R2	R1	R2	R1	R2	R1	R2	R1	R2	Pos	Pts	Ref
2007	BSB	Honda	7	5	5	7	7	6	5	6	4	4	Ret	7	6	4	Ret	6	6	4	3	3	3	5	2	2	Ret	7	6th	279	

Year	Class	Bike	THR (England)		OUL (England)		BHGP (England)		DON (England)		SNE (England)		MAL (England)		OUL (England)		KNO (Scotland)		CAD (England)		CRO (England)		SIL (England)		BHI (England)		Pos	Pts	Ref
Year	Class	Bike	R1	R2	R1	R2	R1	R2	R1	R2	R1	R2	R1	R2	R1	R2	R1	R2	R1	R2	R1	R2	R1	R2	R1	R2	Pos	Pts	Ref
2008	BSB	Suzuki	6	8	5	Ret	2	Ret	3	6	3	7	4	4	1	1	1	4	2	2	3	2	DSQ	3	6	Ret	4th	316	

Year	Bike	1		2		3		4		5		6		7			8			9		10		11		12			Pos	Pts	Ref
Year	Bike	R1	R2	R1	R2	R1	R2	R1	R2	R1	R2	R1	R2	R1	R2	R3	R1	R2	R3	R1	R2	R1	R2	R1	R2	R1	R2	R3	Pos	Pts	Ref
2010	Kawasaki	BHI	BHI	THR	THR	OUL	OUL	CAD	CAD	MAL	MAL	KNO	KNO	SNE	SNE	SNE	BHGP; 5	BHGP; 1	BHGP; 1	CAD	CAD	CRO	CRO	SIL	SIL	OUL	OUL	OUL	16th	61	

Year	Bike	1			2			3			4			5			6			7			8			9			10			11			Pos	Pts
Year	Bike	R1	R2	R3	R1	R2	R3	R1	R2	R3	R1	R2	R3	R1	R2	R3	R1	R2	R3	R1	R2	R3	R1	R2	R3	R1	R2	R3	R1	R2	R3	R1	R2	R3	Pos	Pts
2022	Ducati	SIL; 12	SIL; Ret	SIL; 16	OUL; 15	OUL; 13	OUL; 11	DON; 11	DON; 11	DON; 7	KNO; 12	KNO; 11	KNO; 10	BRH; 13	BRH; 8	BRH; Ret	THR; 9	THR; 12	THR; 10	CAD; Ret	CAD; 10	CAD; 20	SNE; 7	SNE; 10	SNE; Ret	OUL; 10	OUL; 7	OUL; 6	DON; 1	DON; 1	DON; Ret	BRH; 10	BRH; 10	BRH; 11	12th	187
2025	Aprilia	OUL	OUL	OUL	DON; Ret	DON; Ret	DON; DNS	SNE; WD	SNE; WD	SNE; WD	KNO	KNO	KNO	BRH	BRH	BRH	THR	THR	THR	CAD	CAD	CAD	DON	DON	DON	ASS	ASS	ASS	OUL	OUL	OUL	BRH	BRH	BRH	27th*	0*

=== Superbike World Championship ===
==== Races by year ====
(key) (Races in bold indicate pole position, races in italics indicate fastest lap)

Year	Bike	1		2		3		4		5		6		7		8		9		10		11		12		13		14		Pos.	Pts
Year	Bike	R1	R2	R1	R2	R1	R2	R1	R2	R1	R2	R1	R2	R1	R2	R1	R2	R1	R2	R1	R2	R1	R2	R1	R2	R1	R2	R1	R2	Pos.	Pts
2008	Suzuki	QAT	QAT	AUS	AUS	SPA	SPA	NED	NED	ITA	ITA	USA	USA	GER	GER	SMR	SMR	CZE	CZE	GBR; Ret	GBR; 7	EUR; 2	EUR; 10	ITA	ITA	FRA	FRA	POR	POR	21st	35
2009	Yamaha	AUS; 10	AUS; 10	QAT; 7	QAT; 5	SPA; 7	SPA; 10	NED; 4	NED; 6	ITA; 6	ITA; 6	RSA; 10	RSA; 9	USA; 13	USA; 9	SMR; 8	SMR; 7	GBR; Ret	GBR; 5	CZE; Ret	CZE; 7	GER; 9	GER; 8	ITA; 9	ITA; 12	FRA; Ret	FRA; Ret	POR; DNS	POR; DNS	9th	176
2010	Kawasaki	AUS; 13	AUS; Ret	POR; 15	POR; 13	SPA; 11	SPA; 15	NED; 12	NED; Ret	ITA; 9	ITA; 5	RSA; 16	RSA; 14	USA; 13	USA; 14	SMR; 15	SMR; 16	CZE; 11	CZE; Ret	GBR; 18	GBR; 14	GER; 5	GER; 7	**ITA**; 6	**ITA**; 4	FRA; 7	FRA; 11			14th	106
2011	Kawasaki	AUS; 8	AUS; 9	EUR; Ret	EUR; 12	NED; 14	NED; 11	ITA; 13	ITA; 11	USA; 6	USA; 10	**SMR**; 4	**SMR**; 14	SPA; 5	SPA; Ret	CZE; 10	CZE; 14	GBR; DNS	GBR; DNS	GER; 11	GER; 1	ITA; 4	ITA; Ret	FRA; 8	FRA; Ret	POR; 10	POR; Ret			13th	141
2012	Kawasaki	**AUS**; 4	**AUS**; 3	**ITA**; 2	**ITA**; 2	**NED**; Ret	**NED**; 6	ITA; C	ITA; 1	**EUR**; 3	**EUR**; 3	USA; 8	USA; 5	**SMR**; 4	**SMR**; 7	**SPA**; Ret	**SPA**; 8	**CZE**; 2	**CZE**; 2	GBR; 8	GBR; 12	RUS; 1	RUS; 2	GER; 4	GER; 5	**POR**; 1	**POR**; Ret	**FRA**; 3	**FRA**; 1	**2nd**	**357.5**
2013	Kawasaki	AUS; 5	AUS; 5	**SPA**; Ret	**SPA**; 3	**NED**; 1	**NED**; 2	**ITA**; 2	**ITA**; 3	**GBR**; 1	**GBR**; 1	**POR**; 3	**POR**; NC	**ITA**; 1	**ITA**; 1	RUS; Ret	RUS; C	GBR; 11	GBR; 7	GER; 1	GER; 4	**TUR**; 3	**TUR**; 2	USA; 1	USA; 4	**FRA**; 1	**FRA**; 1	SPA; 3	SPA; 2	**1st**	**447**
2014	Kawasaki	AUS; 7	AUS; 3	**SPA**; 1	**SPA**; 1	NED; 2	NED; 4	ITA; 3	ITA; 5	GBR; 1	GBR; 1	MAL; Ret	MAL; 3	**SMR**; 1	**SMR**; 1	**POR**; 1	**POR**; 8	**USA**; 3	**USA**; 1	SPA; 5	SPA; 3	**FRA**; 4	**FRA**; 4	QAT; 3	QAT; 3					**2nd**	**410**
2015	Kawasaki	AUS; 6	AUS; 4	THA; 3	THA; 5	SPA; 3	SPA; Ret	NED; 5	NED; 5	ITA; 2	ITA; 2	**GBR**; 1	**GBR**; 1	POR; 2	POR; 8	**SMR**; 1	**SMR**; 5	USA; 2	USA; 2	**MAL**; 5	**MAL**; 14	**SPA**; 1	**SPA**; 5	FRA; 2	FRA; 3	**QAT**; 3	**QAT**; 3			3rd	399
2016	Kawasaki	**AUS**; 5	**AUS**; 6	THA; 2	THA; 1	**SPA**; 3	**SPA**; 2	**NED**; Ret	**NED**; 2	ITA; 3	ITA; 3	**MAL**; 1	**MAL**; 8	**GBR**; 1	**GBR**; 1	**ITA**; 2	**ITA**; 2	**USA**; 2	**USA**; 1	GER; 2	GER; 12	FRA; 3	FRA; 3	**SPA**; 2	**SPA**; 3	QAT; 4	QAT; 2			2nd	447
2017	Kawasaki	AUS; 3	AUS; 6	THA; 3	THA; 2	ARA; 3	ARA; 4	NED; 2	NED; 2	ITA; 4	ITA; 3	**GBR**; 1	GBR; 2	**ITA**; 1	ITA; 3	**USA**; 3	USA; 2	**GER**; 3	GER; 4	POR; DNS	POR; DNS	FRA; 3	FRA; 7	SPA; 3	SPA; 5	QAT; 6	QAT; Ret			3rd	373
2018	Kawasaki	**AUS**; 2	AUS; 4	THA; 6	THA; Ret	SPA; 6	SPA; 6	NED; 4	NED; 1	ITA; 2	ITA; 3	**GBR**; 3	GBR; 6	**CZE**; 3	CZE; 16	USA; 7	USA; 8	**ITA**; 5	ITA; 5	POR; 5	POR; 5	**FRA**; 2	FRA; 4	ARG; 6	ARG; 5	**QAT**; 2	QAT; C			4th	314

Year	Bike	1			2			3			4			5			6			7			8			9			10			11			12			13			Pos.	Pts
Year	Bike	R1	SR	R2	R1	SR	R2	R1	SR	R2	R1	SR	R2	R1	SR	R2	R1	SR	R2	R1	SR	R2	R1	SR	R2	R1	SR	R2	R1	SR	R2	R1	SR	R2	R1	SR	R2	R1	SR	R2	Pos.	Pts
2019	BMW	AUS; 7	AUS; 11	AUS; 13	THA; 9	THA; 10	THA; Ret	SPA; 5	SPA; 5	SPA; 12	NED; 10	NED; C	NED; 7	ITA; Ret	ITA; 8	ITA; C	SPA; 6	SPA; 5	SPA; 7	ITA; 2	ITA; Ret	ITA; 6	**GBR**; 2	**GBR**; Ret	GBR; 7	USA; 4	USA; 3	USA; 5	POR; 13	POR; 7	POR; 9	FRA; 3	FRA; 8	FRA; 8	ARG; 7	ARG; 9	ARG; Ret	QAT; Ret	QAT; 12	QAT; 12	8th	223
2020	BMW	**AUS**; 9	**AUS**; 6	AUS; 10	SPA; NC	SPA; 6	SPA; 11	POR; 8	POR; 6	POR; 7	SPA; Ret	SPA; 15	SPA; 12	SPA; 10	SPA; 9	SPA; Ret	SPA; Ret	SPA; 9	SPA; 5	FRA; Ret	FRA; 20	FRA; 10	POR; 10	POR; 11	POR; 10																12th	88
2021	BMW	SPA; 6	SPA; Ret	SPA; 4	POR; 14	POR; 7	POR; 8	ITA; 8	ITA; 7	ITA; 12	GBR; 4	GBR; 2	GBR; 3	NED; 7	NED; 7	NED; 15	CZE; 9	CZE; 5	CZE; 9	SPA; 6	SPA; 6	SPA; 5	FRA; 9	FRA; 12	FRA; 10	**SPA**; 8	**SPA**; Ret	SPA; Ret	SPA	SPA	SPA	POR	POR	POR	ARG	ARG	ARG	INA; 10	INA; C	INA; 5	11th	184
2023	Kawasaki	AUS; Ret	AUS; 20	AUS; Ret	INA; 18	INA; Ret	INA; Ret	NED; Ret	NED; 19	NED; 15	SPA; 17	SPA; 19	SPA; Ret																												20th	11
2023	BMW													EMI; 16	EMI; 20	EMI; 13	GBR; 9	GBR; 18	GBR; Ret	ITA	ITA	ITA	CZE	CZE	CZE	FRA	FRA	FRA	SPA	SPA	SPA	POR	POR	POR	JER	JER	JER				20th	11
