= Dean Thomas (motorcyclist) =

Australian motorcycle racer

- Nationality: Australian
- Born: 4 January 1973 (age 53); Port Macquarie, Australia

Dean Thomas (born 4 January 1973) is an Australian motorcycle racer. He won his home country's Supersport championship in 1995 after two other top-five championship finishes, and was fourth in the Australian Superbike Championship series a year later; however, for 1997 he headed for the United Kingdom to race. He came fourth in the country's Supersport series that year, the first of four successive top-six championship finishes highlighted by a run of 11 front-row starts out of 12 in 2000, and a victory as a European Supersport wild card. For 2001, he raced in Supersport World Championship, and struggled on largely unfamiliar circuits. He was 16th overall, and tellingly took his best result of sixth at Phillip Island.

== British Superbike Championship 2002-2006 ==
Thomas first raced in the British Superbike series in 2002 for the Dienza Performance team, finishing 11th overall in a season hampered by several oil leaks. In 2003, he stepped back down to Supersport, but returned to BSB for 2004 on a Ducati. He came seventh overall, again qualifying better than he raced on occasion. A pair of fourth place finishes at Oulton Park were a highlight. Fittingly, in the final round he qualified seventh and finished both races in seventh.

Thomas moved to the Hawk Kawasaki team for 2005, noting that the bike is "very different to the Ducati where you have to be very fierce with the throttle... on the Kawasaki you have to be much smoother, which I'm learning quickly." He was sixth overall, finishing every race with a best result of fourth. The first half of 2006 was less encouraging, until a huge crash at Snetterton left him with fractured ribs and a punctured lung, missing several races. For 2007, he raced a Samsung-backed Suzuki.

== Beyond racing ==
In 2008, Thomas did not race, instead managing the career of Yamaha R1 Cup rider Sam Warren.

== Career statistics ==
=== British Superbike Championship ===
Year	Class	Bike	1		2		3		4		5		6		7		8		9		10		11		12		13		Pos	Pts
Year	Class	Bike	R1	R2	R1	R2	R1	R2	R1	R2	R1	R2	R1	R2	R1	R2	R1	R2	R1	R2	R1	R2	R1	R2	R1	R2	R1	R2	Pos	Pts
2004	BSB	Ducati	SIL; 8	SIL; 6	BHI; Ret	BHI; 8	SNE; 6	SNE; 5	OUL; 4	OUL; 4	MON; 5	MON; Ret	THR; 5	THR; Ret	BHGP; 10	BHGP; Ret	KNO; Ret	KNO; 9	MAL; 8	MAL; 8	CRO; 8	CRO; Ret	CAD; 6	CAD; 4	OUL; 7	OUL; 5	DON; 7	DON; 7	7th	193

Pos	Rider	Bike	BHI (England)		THR (England)		MAL (England)		OUL (England)		MOP (Republic of Ireland)		CRO (England)		KNO (Scotland)		SNE (England)		SIL (England)		CAD (England)		OUL (England)		DON (England)		BHGP (England)		Pos	Pts
Pos	Rider	Bike	R1	R2	R1	R2	R1	R2	R1	R2	R1	R2	R1	R2	R1	R2	R1	R2	R1	R2	R1	R2	R1	R2	R1	R2	R1	R2	Pos	Pts
2005	BSB	Kawasaki	8	11	8	6	6	4	6	15	15	13	10	6	10	10	11	9	6	6	9	7	11	7	9	6	5	5	6th	198

Pos	Rider	Bike	BHI (England)		DON (England)		THR (England)		OUL (England)		MAL (England)		SNE (England)		KNO (Scotland)		OUL (England)		CRO (England)		CAD (England)		SIL (England)		BHGP (England)		Pos	Pts
Pos	Rider	Bike	R1	R2	R1	R2	R1	R2	R1	R2	R1	R2	R1	R2	R1	R2	R1	R2	R1	R2	R1	R2	R1	R2	R1	R2	Pos	Pts
2006	BSB	Kawasaki	8	8	9	Ret	9	6	12	Ret	8	9	11	Ret					12	12	8	11	8	8			11th	109
2006	BSB	Honda																							11	13	11th	109

=== FIM World Endurance Championship ===
==== By team ====
Year	Team	Bike	Rider	TC
2004	Yamaha Austria Racing Team	Yamaha YZF-R1	(Slovenia) Igor Jerman (Austria) Horst Saiger (Austria) Thomas Hinterreiter (United Kingdom) James Ellison (United Kingdom) Mike Edwards (United Kingdom) Gary Mason (Australia) Dean Thomas (France) Marc Garcia	4th
