= Ryuichi Kiyonari =

Japanese motorcycle racer

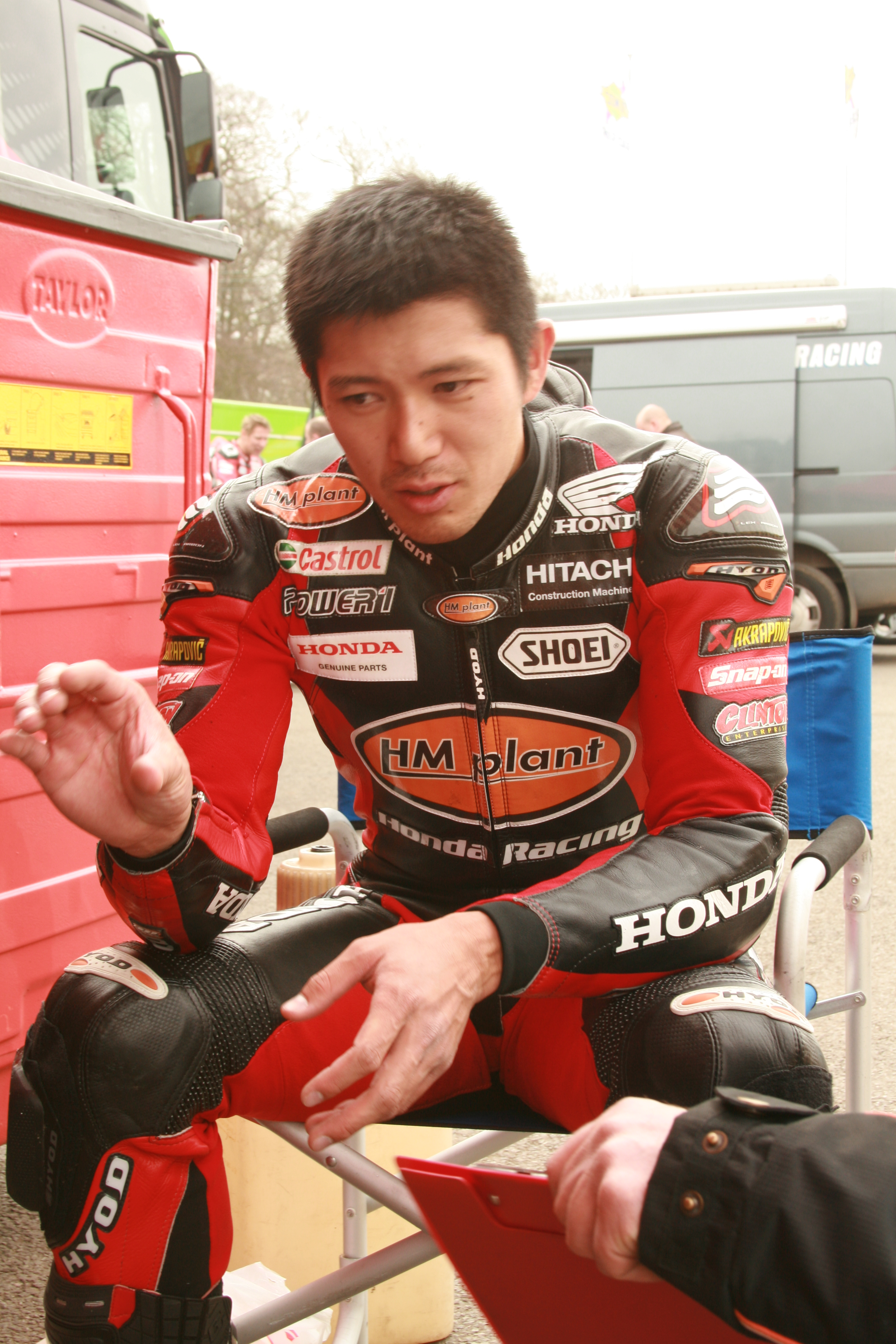
- Kiyonari in 2011
- Nationality: Japanese
- Born: September 23, 1982 (age 44); Saitama, Japan
- Bike number: 23
Motorcycle racing career statistics
British Superbike Championship
Active years	2004–2008, 2010–2014
Manufacturers	Honda, BMW, Suzuki
Championships	3 (2006,2007,2010)
2015 championship position	20th (66pts)
Starts / Wins / Podiums / Poles / F. laps / Points; 239 / 50 / 94 / 25 / 38 / 4005

Ryuichi Kiyonari (Japanese: 清成 龍一, Hepburn: Kiyonari Ryūichi; born September 23, 1982 in Saitama, Japan) is a Japanese retired Grand Prix motorcycle racer.

Kiyonari previously rode a Honda CBR1000RR in the MFJ All-Japan Road Race JSB1000 Championship. He was the 2006, 2007 and 2010 British Superbike champion and enjoys fame and popularity amongst British motorcycle race fans due to his success and personality. He raced for Honda Asia in 2012.

Kiyonari won the 2008 Suzuka 8-Hour race, teamed with his former WSBK teammate Carlos Checa.

== Early years ==
Kiyonari first raced in 1988 in motocross, which he later stated that he did not especially enjoy. He began circuit racing in 1996, and first raced in the All-Japan 125cc Championship in 1998. He continued in this class until 1999 and spent the 2000 and 2001 season in the All-Japan 250cc Championship, with a shortage of big results, other than 9th place in the 2000 Suzuka 8 Hours race.

In 2002, Kiyonari switched to the All-Japan ST600 championship, which he won with four victories. He also took an All-Japan Superbike Championship victory at TI Aida.

== MotoGP ==
Throughout 2002 and 2003, Kiyonari was employed by the Honda Racing Corporation as their official test rider. Main rider Daijiro Kato was killed in the 2003 Japanese motorcycle Grand Prix, meaning Gresini Racing would need a second rider. Kiyonari received a telephone call from team principal Fausto Gresini to move to MotoGP started from 2003 French motorcycle Grand Prix until the remainder of the season. There were eight minor points finishes, leaving him 20th overall with a best of 11th.

== British Superbike Championship ==
After coming 6th overall in the British Superbike Championship in 2004, Kiyonari won the first four races of 2005, before injuring his ankle in a heavy crash in round 5. He was back for round 9, and retook the championship lead from teammate Michael Rutter, but eventually was overhauled by the improving Ducati of Lavilla and he finished the season runner up. Kiyonari also raced in the Valencia Grand Prix for Sito Pons' Camel Honda team, finishing in the points.

In 2006, a double victory at Silverstone in the penultimate round kept Kiyonari in close contention for the title. However, in the double point final round at Brands Hatch, after a win in race one (he was leading when Shane Byrne's heavy crash caused a stoppage. Kiyonari only needed to finish third in the final race. Kiyonari finished 2nd in the shortened race behind Haslam, thus winning the championship by eight points.

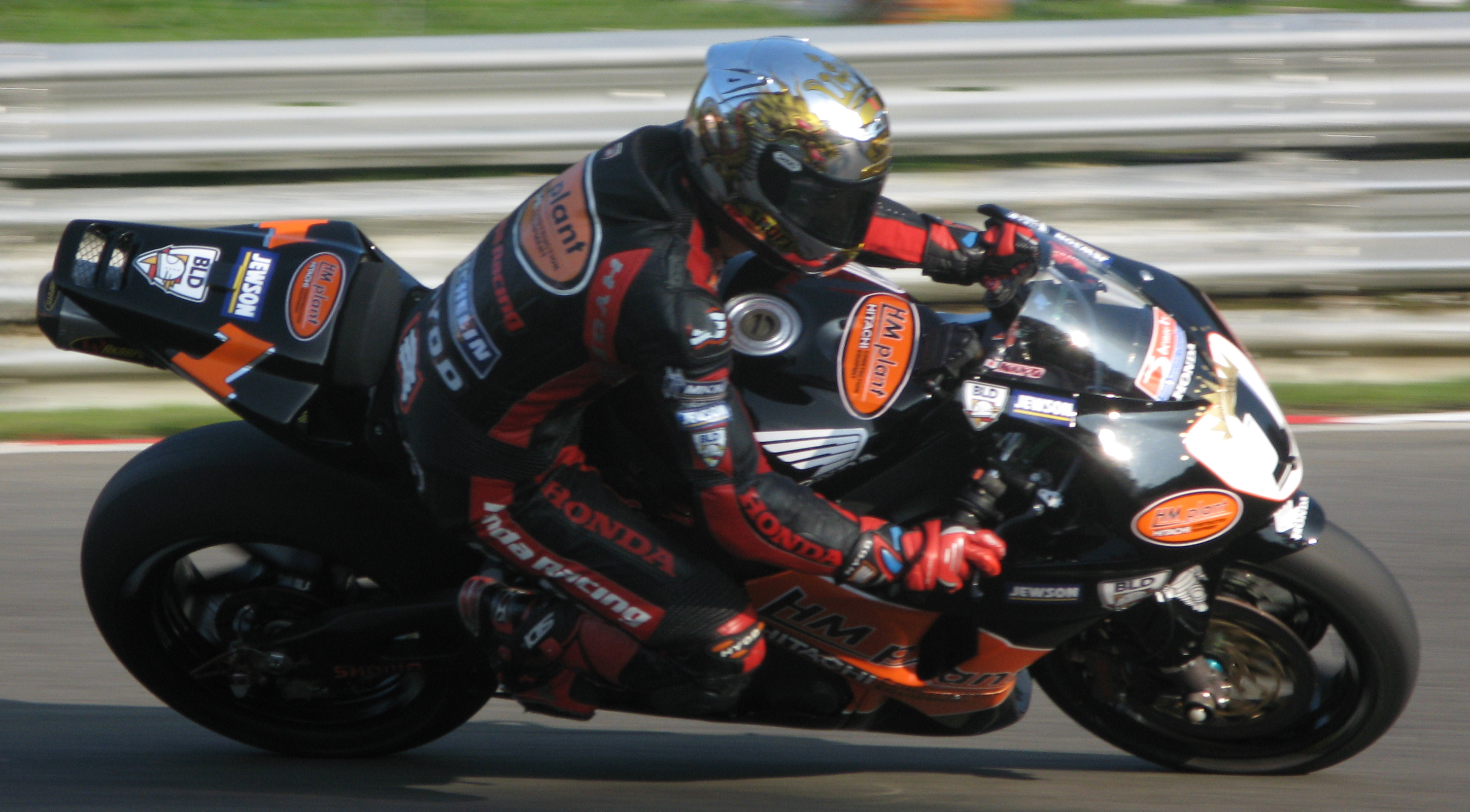
Kiyonari in 2007

The 2007 season started at Brands Hatch, with Jonathan Rea and Leon Camier performing better on their Hondas. However, Kiyonari took a double win in round three, and a further win in race 2 at Oulton Park, to lie second to Lavilla after four rounds. Finally, Kiyonari defended his British champion at Brands Hatch to win the championship for the second time in succession.

== Superbike World Championship ==
In 2008, Kiyonari made his Superbike World Championship debut, having reached an agreement with Ten Kate Honda, to partner Carlos Checa and Kenan Sofuoğlu.

In the second race at Monza, Kiyonari nearly had his first SBK win. Kiyonari was in front as they braked for the final entry into the Parabolica but went wide on the exit and Noriyuki Haga and Max Neukirchner edged him out - Haga for the win and Neukirchner claiming second by a gap of just .009. Kiyonari finished third with a gap of .051, his first Superbike podium.

Kiyonari's first two wins came at Brands Hatch, beating Troy Bayliss in race 1 and Noriyuki Haga in race 2. He briefly led the very next race at Donington Park, but fell on lap 2. However, he did win the second race in very wet conditions, visibly sliding the rear end of his bike on many occasions. Kiyonari broke his collarbone in a testing crash at Magny Cours, two weeks prior to the event, missing the race.

For 2009, Kiyonari stayed with the Ten Kate Honda team, partnering Carlos Checa and Jonathan Rea. His bike was backed by Honda Europe rather than Hannspree. He finished 11th in the championship standings.

== Return to British Superbikes ==
In September 2009, Kiyonari returned to British Superbikes to make a wildcard appearance at Croft Circuit, replacing the injured Glen Richards. He finished fourth in race one before finishing race two in 18th position.

In December 2009, Kiyonari was confirmed as one of HM Plant Honda's riders for the 2010 British Superbike Championship season, partnering Australian rider Josh Brookes. At Cadwell Park, he won race one but retired from race two before it began, due to a technical problem on the warm-up lap. He scored a double win at Mallory Park, lifting him to fourth overall in the standings. 2011 saw Kiyonari stay with HM Plant Honda in the British Superbike Championship, alongside two time BSB Champion Shane Byrne. He finished sixth overall.

== FIM Asia Road Racing Championship ==
For the 2012 season, Kiyonari headed to Asia, leading Malaysian team Boon Siew Honda Malaysia Racing as they aspire to lift the FIM Asian SuperSports 600cc trophy. He went on to win the 2012 Asia Road Racing Championship title.

== Return again to the British Superbike Championship ==
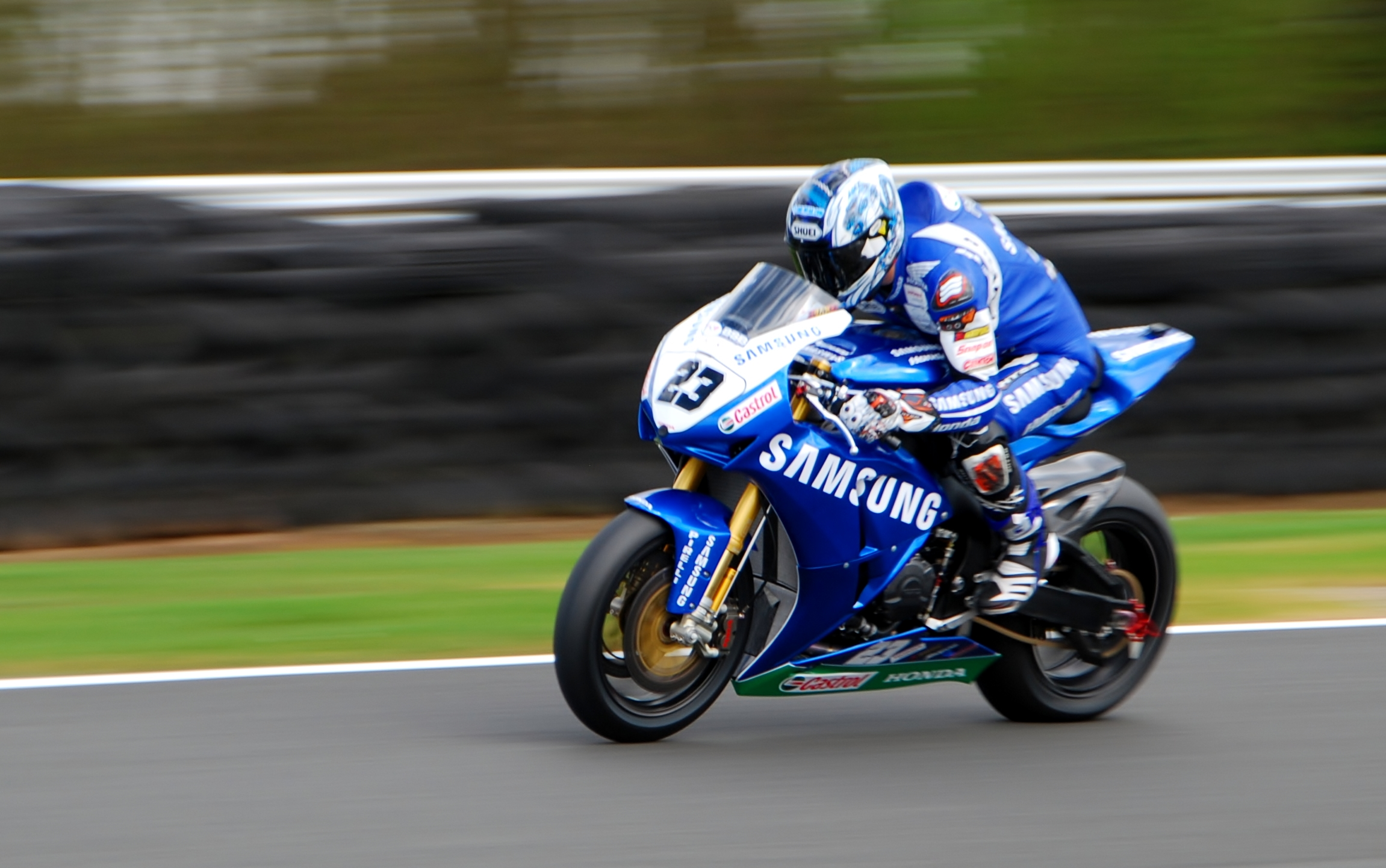
Kiyonari in 2013

In 2013 Kiyonari returned to the BSB, racing with Samsung Honda. He finished 6th overall.

In December 2013, Speed of Japan announced that Kiyonari would be racing with Buildbase BMW in the BSB in 2014. . Kiyonari's move to BMW was his first ever race with a manufacturer other than Honda, followed in 2016 by a switch to Suzuki.

== FIM World Endurance Championship Suzuka 8 Hours ==
Kiyonari has four wins at the Suzuka 8 Hours, in 2005, 2008, 2010, 2012. He is the rider with most wins that is currently still active.

== Career statistics ==
1998: 26th, All Japan Road Race GP125 Championship #90 Honda RS125R
1999: 23rd, All Japan Road Race GP125 Championship #26 Honda RS125R
2000: 20th, All Japan Road Race GP250 Championship #111 Honda RS250R
2001: 16th, All Japan Road Race GP250 Championship #100 Honda RS250R
2002: 1st, All Japan Road Race ST600 Championship #54 Honda CBR600RR
2012: 1st, Asia Road Race SS600 Championship #23 Honda CBR600RR
2017: 11th, All Japan Road Race JSB1000 Championship #88 Honda CBR1000RR
2018: All Japan Road Race JSB1000 Championship #23 Honda CBR1000RR

=== Supersport World Championship ===
==== Races by year ====
(key) (Races in bold indicate pole position; races in italics indicate fastest lap)

Year	Team	1	2	3	4	5	6	7	8	9	10	11	Pos.	Pts
2003	Honda	SPA	AUS	JPN; 2	ITA	GER	GBR	SMR	GBR	NED	ITA	FRA	21st	20

=== By season ===
Season	Class	Moto	Team	Race	Win	Pod	Pole	FLap	Pts	Plcd	WCh
2003	MotoGP	RC211V	Telefónica Gresini Honda	13	0	0	0	0	22	20th	–
Total				**13**	**0**	**0**	**0**	**0**	**0**		**0**

==== Races by year ====
(key) (Races in bold indicate pole position) (Races in italics indicate fastest lap)

Year	Class	Bike	1	2	3	4	5	6	7	8	9	10	11	12	13	14	15	16	17	Pos.	Pts
2003	MotoGP	Honda	JPN	RSA	SPA	FRA; 13	ITA; 13	CAT; 11	NED; 17	GBR; 14	GER; 18	CZE; 15	POR; 16	BRA; 15	PAC; 11	MAL; 21	AUS; 19	VAL; 14		20th	22
2005	MotoGP	Honda	SPA	POR	CHN	FRA	ITA	CAT	NED	USA	GBR	GER	CZE	JPN	MAL	QAT	AUS	TUR	VAL; 12	25th	4

=== Suzuka 8 Hours results ===
Year	Team	Co-Rider	Bike	Pos
2005	(Japan) Seven Stars Racing	(Japan) Ryuichi Kiyonari (Japan) Tohru Ukawa	Honda CBR1000RR	1st
2008	(Japan) Dream Honda Racing	(Japan) Ryuchi Kiyonari (Spain) Carlos Checa	Honda CBR1000RR	1st
2010	(Japan) MuSASHi RT HARC-PRO	(Japan) Takaaki Nakagami (Japan) Takumi Takahashi	CBR1000RRW	1st
2011	(Japan) F.C.C.-TSR Honda	(Japan) Ryuichi Kiyonari (Japan) Kousuke Akiyoshi (Japan) Shinichi Ito	CBR1000RRW	1st

=== Superbike World Championship ===
==== Races by year ====
(key) (Races in bold indicate pole position; races in italics indicate fastest lap)

Year	Make	1		2		3		4		5		6		7		8		9		10		11		12		13		14		Pos.	Pts
Year	Make	R1	R2	R1	R2	R1	R2	R1	R2	R1	R2	R1	R2	R1	R2	R1	R2	R1	R2	R1	R2	R1	R2	R1	R2	R1	R2	R1	R2	Pos.	Pts
2008	Honda	QAT; 22	QAT; 19	AUS; 9	AUS; 6	SPA; Ret	SPA; 4	NED; 7	NED; Ret	ITA; 6	ITA; 3	USA; 10	USA; 7	GER; 12	GER; 11	SMR; 14	SMR; 13	CZE; 5	CZE; 6	GBR; 1	GBR; 1	EUR; Ret	EUR; 1	ITA; Ret	ITA; 13	FRA	FRA	POR; 8	POR; 11	9th	206
2009	Honda	AUS; Ret	AUS; 23	QAT; 8	QAT; 4	SPA; 12	SPA; 9	NED; 15	NED; Ret	ITA; 3	ITA; 3	RSA; 12	RSA; 13	USA; 4	USA; 5	SMR; Ret	SMR; 14	GBR; 10	GBR; 7	CZE; 13	CZE; 13	GER; 14	GER; 7	ITA; 5	ITA; 17	FRA; Ret	FRA; DNS	POR; DNS	POR; DNS	11th	141
2010	Honda	AUS	AUS	POR	POR	SPA	SPA	NED	NED	ITA	ITA	RSA	RSA	USA	USA	SMR	SMR	CZE	CZE	GBR; 21	GBR; 16	GER	GER	ITA	ITA	FRA	FRA			NC	0

=== British Superbike Championship ===
(key) (Races in bold indicate pole position; races in italics indicate fastest lap)

Year	Bike	1		2		3		4		5		6		7		8		9		10		11		12		13		Pos	Pts
Year	Bike	R1	R2	R1	R2	R1	R2	R1	R2	R1	R2	R1	R2	R1	R2	R1	R2	R1	R2	R1	R2	R1	R2	R1	R2	R1	R2	Pos	Pts
2004	Honda	SIL; 2	SIL; 2	BHI; 6	BHI; 6	SNE; 7	SNE; 9	OUL; WD	OUL; WD	MON	MON	THR; 13	THR; 8	BHGP; 18	BHGP; 20	KNO; 10	KNO; 14	MAL; 4	MAL; 3	CRO; 4	CRO; 4	CAD; 2	CAD; 16	OUL; 12	OUL; 6	**DON**; 1	**DON**; 1	6th	234
2005	Honda	BHI; 1	BHI; 1	THR; 1	THR; 1	**MAL**; Ret	**MAL**; DNS	OUL	OUL	MOP; 1	MOP; 3	CRO; 1	CRO; 3	**KNO**; 1	**KNO**; 1	SNE; 1	SNE; Ret	**SIL**; 8	**SIL**; 1	CAD; 5	CAD; 3	OUL; 1	OUL; 1	DON; 2	DON; 3	BHGP; 4	BHGP; 4	2nd	429

Year	Make	1			2			3			4			5			6			7			8			9			10			11			12			13			Pos	Pts
Year	Make	R1	R2	R3	R1	R2	R3	R1	R2	R3	R1	R2	R3	R1	R2	R3	R1	R2	R3	R1	R2	R3	R1	R2	R3	R1	R2	R3	R1	R2	R3	R1	R2	R3	R1	R2	R3	R1	R2	R3	Pos	Pts
2006	Honda	BHI; 4	BHI; 1		DON; 2	DON; Ret		THR; 3	THR; 4		OUL; 6	OUL; 5		MOP; C	MOP; C		MAL; 1	MAL; 3		SNE; 1	SNE; 1		KNO; 1	KNO; Ret		OUL; 1	OUL; 1		CRO; 1	CRO; 5		CAD; 3	CAD; Ret		SIL; 1	SIL; 1		BHGP; 1	BHGP; 2		**1st**	**466**
2007	Honda	BHGP; 8	BHGP; 11		THR; 3	THR; 2		**SIL**; 1	**SIL**; 1		OUL; 3	OUL; 1		SNE; 1	SNE; 1		MON; 5	MON; 5		KNO; 2	KNO; 3		OUL; 1	OUL; Ret		**MAL**; Ret	**MAL**; 1		CRO; 1	CRO; 1		CAD; 2	CAD; 2		DON; Ret	DON; 3		BHI; 3	BHI; 4		1st	433
2009	Honda	BHI	BHI		OUL	OUL		DON	DON		THR	THR		SNE	SNE		KNO	KNO		MAL	MAL		BHGP	BHGP	BHGP	CAD	CAD		CRO; 4	CRO; 18		SIL	SIL		OUL	OUL	OUL				**29th**	**13**
2010	Honda	**BHI**; 2	BHI; Ret		THR; 9	THR; 4		OUL; Ret	**OUL**; 4		CAD; 1	**CAD**; DNS		**MAL**; 1	**MAL**; 1		KNO; 2	KNO; C		SNE; 2	SNE; Ret	SNE; 1	BHGP; 3	BHGP; 2	BHGP; 2	CAD; 3	CAD; 3		CRO; 11	CRO; 4		SIL; 5	SIL; 2		OUL; 1	OUL; 1	**OUL**; 1				1st	649
2011	Honda	BHI; Ret	BHI; 2		OUL; 1	**OUL**; 4		CRO; 25	CRO; 15		THR; 10	THR; 19		KNO; 10	KNO; 4		SNE; 5	**SNE**; 1		OUL; 15	OUL; C		BHGP; 17	BHGP; 12	BHGP; 6	CAD; 5	CAD; 9	CAD; 7	DON; Ret	DON; 6		SIL; 28	SIL; 13		BHGP; 17	BHGP; 16	BHGP; 11				6th	526
2013	Honda	BHI; 8	BHI; 4		THR; 17	THR; Ret		OUL; 14	OUL; 12		KNO; 3	KNO; 3		SNE; 5	SNE; 4		BHGP; 3	BHGP; 5		OUL; 6	OUL; 3	OUL; 10	CAD; 7	CAD; 5		DON; 13	DON; 11		ASS; 14	ASS; 3		SIL	SIL		BHGP	BHGP	BHGP				6th	522
2014	BMW	BHI; 16	BHI; 4		OUL; Ret	OUL; Ret		SNE; 5	SNE; 4		**KNO**; 1	KNO; 2		BHGP; 1	BHGP; Ret		THR; 3	THR; 3		OUL; 1	OUL; 1	OUL; 4	CAD; Ret	**CAD**; Ret		DON; 1	DON; 1		ASS; 2	ASS; 2		**SIL**; 2	SIL; 1		BHGP; WD	BHGP; WD	BHGP; WD				**2nd**	**620**

Year	Make	1		2		3			4		5		6			7		8			9			10		11		12			Pos	Pts
Year	Make	R1	R2	R1	R2	R1	R2	R3	R1	R2	R1	R2	R1	R2	R3	R1	R2	R1	R2	R3	R1	R2	R3	R1	R2	R1	R2	R1	R2	R3	Pos	Pts
2015	BMW	**DON**; 14	DON; Ret	BHI; 4	BHI; 4	OUL; 5	OUL; Ret		SNE; 21	SNE; Ret	KNO; Ret	KNO; 4	BHGP; 16	BHGP; 18		THR; 17	THR; 17	CAD; 14	CAD; Ret		OUL; 15	OUL; 12	OUL; 9	ASS	ASS	SIL; Ret	SIL; 16	BHGP	BHGP	BHGP	20th	66
2016	Suzuki / BMW	SIL; 11	SIL; 12	OUL; Ret	OUL; DNS	BHI; DNS	BHI; Ret		KNO; 19	KNO; Ret	SNE; 20	SNE; 7	THR; 11	THR; 19		BHGP; 22	BHGP	CAD	CAD		OUL; 16	OUL; 10	OUL; 15	DON; DNS	DON; DNS	ASS; 18	ASS; 18	BHGP; 14	BHGP; 15	BHGP; 7	20th	42
2018	Honda	DON	DON	BHI	BHI	OUL; 12	OUL; 15		SNE	SNE	KNO	KNO	BHGP	BHGP		THR	THR	CAD	CAD		SIL	SIL	SIL	OUL	OUL	ASS	ASS	BHGP	BHGP	BHGP	29th	5

=== All Japan Road Race Championship ===
==== Races by year ====
(key) (Races in bold indicate pole position; races in italics indicate fastest lap)

Year	Class	Bike	1	2	3	4	5	6	7	8	9	10	11	Pos	Pts
2024	JSB1000	Honda	SUZ	MOT1	MOT2	SUG1; 11	SUG2; 11	MOT; 10	AUT1; 17	AUT2; 12	OKA; 12	SUZ1; 13	SUZ2; 11	12th	38
