= Jake Dixon =

British motorcycle racer (born 1996)

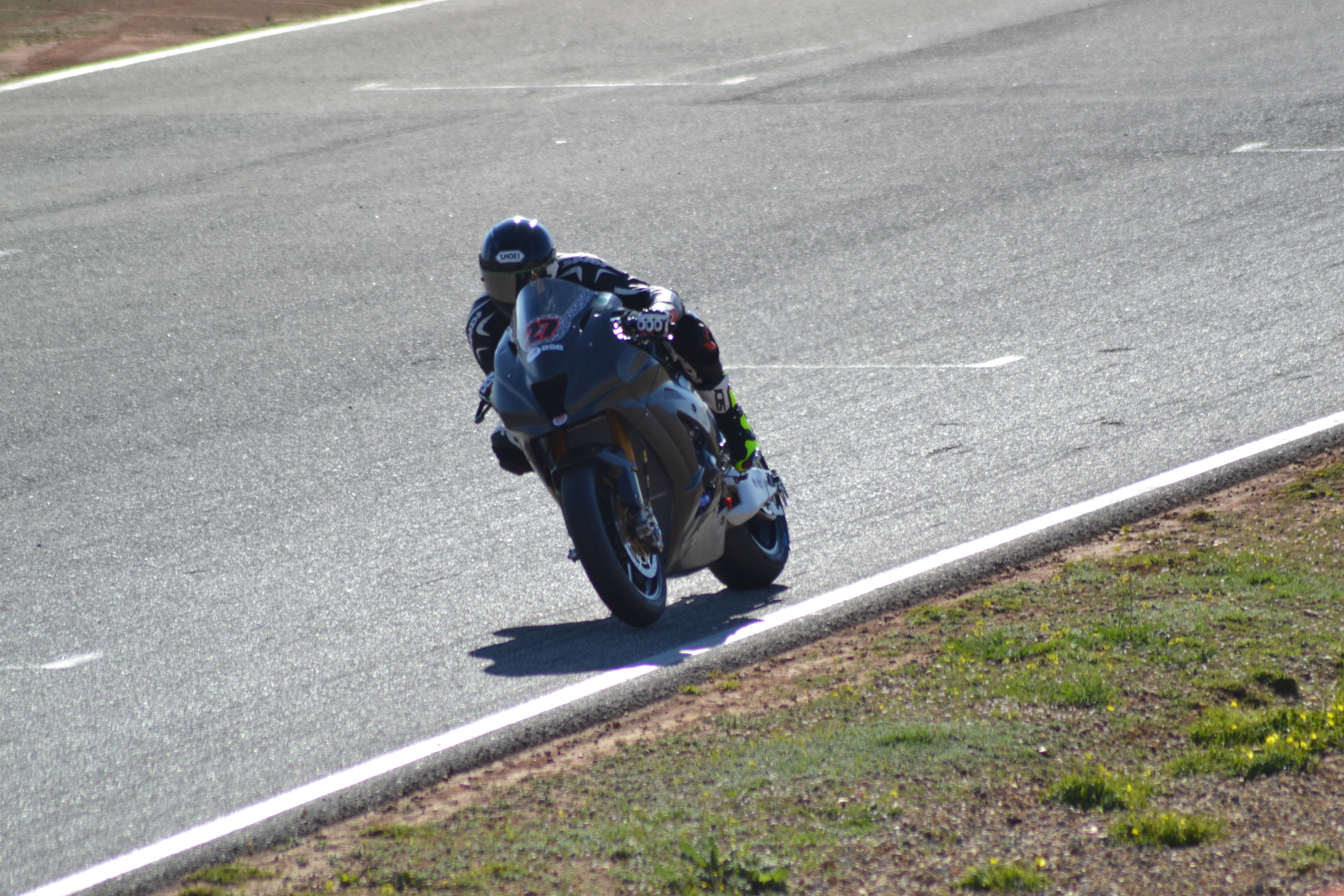
- Jake Dixon in 2017
- Nationality: British
- Born: 15 January 1996 (age 30); Dover, Kent, England
- Current team: Honda HRC
- Bike number: 96
Motorcycle racing career statistics
MotoGP World Championship
Active years	2021, 2026
Manufacturers	Yamaha (2021); Honda (2026)
Championships	0
2021 championship position	30th (0 pts)
Starts / Wins / Podiums / Poles / F. laps / Points; 3 / 0 / 0 / 0 / 0 / 2
Moto2 World Championship
Active years	2017, 2019–2025
Manufacturers	Suter (2017); KTM (2019); Kalex (2020–2024); Boscoscuro (2025)
2025 championship position	5th (225 pts)
Starts / Wins / Podiums / Poles / F. laps / Points; 125 / 7 / 22 / 8 / 4 / 833.5
Superbike World Championship
Active years	2017, 2026
Manufacturers	Kawasaki, Honda
Championships	0
2026 championship position	19th (41 pts)
Starts / Wins / Podiums / Poles / F. laps / Points; 18 / 0 / 0 / 0 / 0 / 48
British Superbike Championship
Active years	2016–2018
Manufacturers	BMW, Kawasaki
Championships	0
2018 championship position	2nd (629 pts)
Starts / Wins / Podiums / Poles / F. laps / Points; 64 / 5 / 22 / 6 / 6 / 1241
British Supersport Championship
Active years	2015
Manufacturers	Triumph
Championships	0
2015 championship position	3rd (337 pts)
Starts / Wins / Podiums / Poles / F. laps / Points; 24 / 4 / 14 / 3 / 5 / 337

Awards
- 2017, 2018: BSB Rider of the Year

Jake Curtis Dixon (born 15 January 1996) is a British Grand Prix motorcycle racer competing for the Honda HRC in the 2026 Superbike World Championship.

Dixon is best known for placing second in the 2018 British Superbike Championship and was the youngest rider ever to qualify for the championship showdown in 2017. He is the son of Darren Dixon, TT F1 Superbike Champion in 1988 and double World Sidecar Champion in 1995 and 1996.

== Career ==
=== Early career ===
At 12 years of age, Dixon was competing in the Southern Supermoto Championship before advancing to the Aprilia Superteens Championship in 2010.

In his first year competing on tarmac, Dixon came third in the Aprilia 125cc Superteens Championship. The winner that year was Chrissy Rouse, later competing against Dixon in the 2018 British Superbike Championship.

Dixon advanced up to the Aprilia RRV450 Challenge Championship racing Aprilia's twin cylinder four-stroke machine. Once again, he was third in the Championship that year.

=== Supersport 600 Championship ===
In 2012, at 16 years of age, Dixon advanced to the British National Superstock 600 Championship, one of the support classes in the British Superbike Championship. He acquitted himself well on the Shaun Rose prepared, Moto Breakers Yamaha R6, finishing fourth in the Championship. If he had not crashed going over the mountain at Cadwell Park injuring his wrist, he could have finished higher than fourth.

In 2013, Dixon contested the year with a new team and a new championship. He moved up to the Supersport 600 Championship, riding for Craig Fitzpatrick's CF Motorsport team, on a Yamaha R6. After six rounds, he crashed heavily at Oulton Park and broke his scaphoid bone. This ended his season, he finished 16th in the championship.

Staying in the Supersport 600 Championship for 2014, Dixon rode for the Appleyard/Macadam/Doodson team again on a Yamaha R6. He finished the season in eighth position.

For 2015, Dixon joined the Smith's team riding a three-cylinder Triumph 675, and achieved third place in the Supersport 600 Championship.

=== British Superbike Championship ===
Dixon moved up to the 2016 British Superbike Championship, and while it was originally planned that he would teaming up with Dave Tyson's Tsingtao Kawasaki team for the season, financial concerns led to the team not fielding a pair of riders that season, managing to start at only one round with Danny Buchan. Dixon was offered an alternative ride half way through the year, with Lee Hardy's Briggs Equipment BMW S1000RR, but after six rounds his brakes failed at Oulton Park, resulting in a broken hip, ending his season prematurely.

Dixon won both round-four races of the 2017 British Superbike Championship at Knockhill Racing Circuit. He finished sixth in the 2017 British Superbike Championship and was the youngest ever rider to make the final showdown, made up from the top-six riders.

Dixon announced that he would stay with the Lee Hardy Racing/RAF Regular & Reserves Team in 2018, on a Kawasaki ZX10R 1000 cc machine in the 2018 British Superbike Championship. He finished his participation in the British Superbike Championship series in second position to champion Leon Haslam.

=== Superbike World Championship ===
Dixon also made his first appearance in the Superbike World Championship in 2017 as a wildcard entry at Donington Park with Royal Air Force Reg. & Res. Kawasaki Team, where he retired in the first race, and finished ninth place in the second race.

Dixon would move to the Superbike World Championship full-time in 2026, riding for Honda HRC alongside Somkiat Chantra.

=== Moto2 World Championship ===
==== Dynavolt Intact GP (2017) ====
Dixon made his Moto2 debut at the 2017 British motorcycle Grand Prix at Silverstone riding for the Dynavolt/Intact Team replacing the injured Marcel Schrotter finishing 25th.

==== Ángel Nieto Team (2019) ====
For 2019, Dixon signed to ride for the Spanish Aspar Team, in the 2019 Moto2 World Championship with team-mate Xavi Cardelús, aboard machinery using 765 cc Triumph controlled engines new to the series, and KTM chassis. He made his full debut as a Moto2 World Championship rider on board a KTM bike, but Dixon’s full-time Moto2 bow, in Qatar of 2019, is not his first Moto2 Grand Prix appearance, having already appeared as a wildcard at Silverstone in 2017, a race he finished in 25th place. Dixon finished his debut season with seven points.

==== Petronas Sprinta Racing (2020–2021) ====
Dixon joined Petronas Sprinta Racing for the 2020 Moto2 World Championship, alongside Xavi Vierge, in the team's third season in Grand Prix racing’s middleweight class. Dixon finished the 2020 season with 44 points.

In October 2020, Petronas Sprint Racing (Sepang Racing Team) announced that Dixon would remain with the Malaysian team in Moto2 for the 2021 season. Dixon finished the year with 30 points.

==== GasGas Aspar Team (2022–2024) ====
From 2022, Dixon is contracted to race for the Aspar Team branded as GasGas using a Kalex chassis in Moto2.

==== MarcVDS Racing Team (2025) ====
On 19 August 2024, MarcVDS Racing Team, announced that Dixon would race for their Moto2 Team in 2025, as they transitioned from the Kalex chassis to the Boscoscuro chassis.

=== MotoGP World Championship ===
==== Petronas Yamaha SRT (2021) ====
Dixon also competed in two MotoGP races for Petronas Yamaha, finishing in 19th place at the British Grand Prix in August and falling on the second lap at Aragon in September 2021.

==== Honda HRC Castrol (2026) ====
Dixon stood for an unwell Joan Mir at Honda HRC Castrol during the Qatar Grand Prix, and continued his deputisation for the Portuguese Grand Prix.

== Personal life ==
In December 2018, Dixon married Sarah, daughter of former racer Eddie Roberts. Sarah delivered their first child – a girl – on 1 April 2023 whilst Dixon was away from home competing in Argentina.

== Career statistics ==
=== British Supersport Championship ===
(key) (Races in bold indicate pole position; races in italics indicate fastest lap)

Year	Bike	1	2	3	4	5	6	7	8	9	10	11	12	13	14	15	16	17	18	19	20	21	22	23	24	Pos	Pts
2015	Triumph	DON; 2	**DON**; 1	BRH; 4	BRH; 3	OUL; Ret	OUL; 1	SNE; Ret	SNE; 5	KNO; Ret	**KNO**; 2	BRH; Ret	BRH; 6	THR; 10	THR; 3	CAD; 3	**CAD**; 1	OUL; 2	OUL; 1	ASS; 3	ASS; 2	SIL; 4	SIL; Ret	BRH; 2	BRH; 2	3rd	337

=== British Superbike Championship ===
==== By year ====
(key) (Races in bold indicate pole position; races in italics indicate fastest lap)

Year	Make	1		2		3		4		5		6		7		8		9			10		11		12			Pos	Pts
Year	Make	R1	R2	R1	R2	R1	R2	R1	R2	R1	R2	R1	R2	R1	R2	R1	R2	R1	R2	R3	R1	R2	R1	R2	R1	R2	R3	Pos	Pts
2016	BMW	SIL	SIL	OUL	OUL	BHI	BHI	KNO; Ret	KNO; 13	SNE; 6	SNE; 12	THR; 17	THR; 16	BHGP; 13	BHGP; 12	CAD; 9	CAD; 10	OUL; 11	OUL; 8	OUL; Ret	DON	DON	ASS	ASS	BHGP	BHGP	BHGP	16th	50
2017	Kawasaki	DON; 9	DON; Ret	BHI; Ret	BHI; 13	OUL; 10	OUL; Ret	KNO; 1	KNO; 1	SNE; 6	SNE; 4	BHGP; 11	BHGP; 10	**THR**; 3	THR; 2	CAD; 2	CAD; Ret	SIL; 4	SIL; 9	SIL; 3	**OUL**; 4	**OUL**; 6	ASS; 8	ASS; 7	BHGP; DNS	BHGP; Ret	BHGP; 12	6th	562
2018	Kawasaki	DON; 11	DON; 12	BHI; 6	BHI; Ret	OUL; 2	OUL; 3	SNE; 3	SNE; 2	**KNO**; 1	KNO; 2	BHGP; 4	BHGP; 4	THR; 2	THR; 3	CAD; 3	CAD; 3	SIL; 5	**SIL**; Ret	SIL; 3	**OUL**; 1	**OUL**; 1	**ASS**; 2	ASS; Ret	**BHGP**; 2	**BHGP**; Ret	BHGP; 3	2nd	629

=== Superbike World Championship ===
==== Races by season ====
Season	Motorcycle	Team	Race	Win	Podium	Pole	FLap	Pts	Plcd
2017	Kawasaki ZX-10RR	Royal Air Force Reg. & Res. Kawasaki	2	0	0	0	0	7	30th
2026	Honda CBR1000RR	Honda HRC	16	0	0	0	0	41	19th
Total			**18**	**0**	**0**	**0**	**0**	**48**	

==== Races by year ====
(key) (Races in bold indicate pole position) (Races in italics indicate fastest lap)

Year	Make	1		2		3		4		5		6		7		8		9		10		11		12		13		Pos.	Pts
Year	Make	R1	R2	R1	R2	R1	R2	R1	R2	R1	R2	R1	R2	R1	R2	R1	R2	R1	R2	R1	R2	R1	R2	R1	R2	R1	R2	Pos.	Pts
2017	Kawasaki	AUS	AUS	THA	THA	SPA	SPA	NED	NED	ITA	ITA	GBR; Ret	GBR; 9	ITA	ITA	USA	USA	GER	GER	POR	POR	FRA	FRA	SPA	SPA	QAT	QAT	30th	7

Year	Bike	1			2			3			4			5			6			7			8			9			10			11			12			Pos	Pts
Year	Bike	R1	SR	R2	R1	SR	R2	R1	SR	R2	R1	SR	R2	R1	SR	R2	R1	SR	R2	R1	SR	R2	R1	SR	R2	R1	SR	R2	R1	SR	R2	R1	SR	R2	R1	SR	R2	Pos	Pts
2026	Honda	AUS	AUS	AUS	POR	POR	POR	NED	NED	NED	HUN	HUN	HUN	CZE	CZE	CZE	ARA; 16	ARA; DNS	ARA; DNS	EMI	EMI	EMI	GBR; 18	GBR; 17	GBR; 17	FRA; 11	FRA; 14	FRA; Ret	ITA; 9	ITA; 9	ITA; 6	POR; 12	POR; 8	POR; 11	SPA; 15	SPA; 15	SPA; 10	19th	41

=== Grand Prix motorcycle racing ===
==== By season ====
Season	Class	Motorcycle	Team	Race	Win	Podium	Pole	FLap	Pts	Plcd
2017	Moto2	Suter	Dynavolt Intact GP	1	0	0	0	0	0	45th
2019	Moto2	KTM	Ángel Nieto Team	17	0	0	0	0	7	25th
2020	Moto2	Kalex	Petronas Sprinta Racing	12	0	0	0	0	44	18th
2021	Moto2	Kalex	Petronas Sprinta Racing	15	0	0	0	0	30	20th
2021	MotoGP	Yamaha	Petronas Yamaha SRT	2	0	0	0	0	0	30th
2022	Moto2	Kalex	GasGas Aspar Team	20	0	6	2	0	168.5	6th
2023	Moto2	Kalex	GasGas Aspar Team	19	2	5	2	1	204	4th
2024	Moto2	Kalex	CFMoto Aspar Team	18	2	5	2	1	155	8th
2025	Moto2	Boscoscuro	Elf Marc VDS Racing Team	22	3	6	2	2	225	5th
2026	MotoGP	Honda	Honda HRC Castrol	1	0	0	0	0	2*	28th*
Total				**128**	**7**	**22**	**8**	**4**	**835.5**	

==== By class ====
Class	Seasons	1st GP	1st pod	1st win	Race	Win	Podiums	Pole	FLap	Pts	WChmp
Moto2	2017, 2019–present	2017 Great Britain	2022 Americas	2023 Netherlands	125	7	22	8	4	823.5	0
MotoGP	2021	2021 Great Britain			3	0	0	0	0	2	0
Total	2017, 2019–present				**128**	**7**	**22**	**8**	**4**	**835.5**	**0**

==== Races by year ====
(key) (Races in bold indicate pole position; races in italics indicate fastest lap)

Year	Class	Bike	1	2	3	4	5	6	7	8	9	10	11	12	13	14	15	16	17	18	19	20	21	22	Pos	Pts
2017	Moto2	Suter	QAT	ARG	AME	SPA	FRA	ITA	CAT	NED	GER	CZE	AUT	GBR; 25	RSM	ARA	JPN	AUS	MAL	VAL; DNS					45th	0
2019	Moto2	KTM	QAT; Ret	ARG; 17	AME; DNS	SPA	FRA; 17	ITA; Ret	CAT; Ret	NED; 12	GER; Ret	CZE; 18	AUT; 19	GBR; 23	RSM; 20	ARA; 23	THA; 19	JPN; 17	AUS; 21	MAL; 17	VAL; 13				25th	7
2020	Moto2	Kalex	QAT; 14	SPA; 18	ANC; Ret	CZE; Ret	AUT; 14	STY; 8	RSM; 16	EMI; 6	CAT; Ret	FRA; Ret	ARA; 4	TER; 7	EUR; DNS	VAL	POR								18th	44
2021	Moto2	Kalex	QAT; 7	DOH; Ret	POR; Ret	SPA; DNS	FRA; 18	ITA; 14	CAT; 18	GER; 21	NED; 18	STY; 11	AUT; 11			RSM; 19	AME; 10	EMI; 13	ALR; Ret	VAL; 16					20th	30
2021	MotoGP	Yamaha												GBR; 19	ARA; Ret										30th	0
2022	Moto2	Kalex	QAT; 11	**INA**; Ret	ARG; 5	AME; 3	POR; Ret	SPA; Ret	FRA; 21	ITA; 6	CAT; 4	GER; 11	**NED**; 3	GBR; 3	AUT; 3	RSM; Ret	ARA; Ret	JPN; 4	THA; 4^{‡}	AUS; 3	MAL; 3	VAL; 7			6th	168.5
2023	Moto2	Kalex	POR; 6	ARG; 3	AME; DNS	SPA; 6	FRA; 5	ITA; 3	GER; 3	NED; 1	GBR; Ret	AUT; 4	**CAT**; 1	RSM; 12	**IND**; Ret	JPN; 4	INA; 4	AUS; Ret	THA; Ret	MAL; 5	QAT; 5	VAL; 6			4th	204
2024	Moto2	Kalex	QAT; DNS	POR; DNS	AME; 23	SPA; Ret	FRA; 17	CAT; 3	ITA; 12	NED; 4	GER; 2	GBR; 1	AUT; 3	**ARA**; 1	RSM; 5	EMI; Ret	INA; 22	**JPN**; 13	AUS; Ret	THA; 7	MAL; 4	SLD; Ret			8th	155
2025	Moto2	Boscoscuro	THA; 7	ARG; 1	**AME**; 1	QAT; Ret	SPA; 9	FRA; 5	GBR; 11	ARA; 13	ITA; 17	NED; 4	**GER**; 3	CZE; 11	AUT; 20	HUN; 4	CAT; 2	RSM; 16	JPN; 2	INA; 9	AUS; 5	MAL; 1	POR; Ret	VAL; 6	5th	225
2026	MotoGP	Honda	THA	BRA	USA	SPA	FRA	CAT	ITA	HUN	CZE	NED	GER	GBR	ARA	RSM	AUT	JPN	INA	AUS	MAL	QAT; 14	POR	VAL	28th*	2*

^{‡} Half points awarded as less than two thirds of the race distance (but at least three full laps) was completed.
* Season still in progress.
