= 2026 Harley-Davidson Bagger World Cup =

2026 season of the Harley-Davidson Bagger World Cup

The 2026 Harley-Davidson Bagger World Cup season was the inaugural season of the Harley-Davidson Bagger World Cup motorcycle racing series. The competition was held as a support category during selected MotoGP events in North America and Europe. The championship featured race-prepared Harley-Davidson touring motorcycles and marks the first time a dedicated bagger motorcycle series appears on the MotoGP support schedule.

Australian rider Archie McDonald became the inaugural Bagger World Cup champion after finishing eighth in Race 2 of the final round of the season at the Red Bull Ring.

== Teams and riders ==
All teams used the series-specified Harley-Davidson's Grand American Touring.

| Team | No. | Rider | Rounds |
|---|---|---|---|
| (United States) Saddlemen Racing | 2 | (United States) Maxwell Toth | 4–6 |
| (United States) Saddlemen Racing | 10 | (United States) Travis Wyman | All |
| (United States) Saddlemen Racing | 13 | (United States) Cory West | 1–3 |
| (United States) Saddlemen Racing | 85 | (United States) Jake Lewis | All |
| (Indonesia) Niti Racing | 20 | (Indonesia) Dimas Ekky Pratama | All |
| (Indonesia) Niti Racing | 29 | (Italy) Andrea Iannone | 2–6 |
| (Indonesia) Niti Racing | 99 | (Spain) Óscar Gutiérrez | All |
| (Italy) Parkingo Team | 27 | (Italy) Filippo Rovelli | 1–5 |
| (Italy) Parkingo Team | 38 | (United Kingdom) Bradley Smith | 4 |
| (Italy) Parkingo Team | 88 | (United States) Max Flinders | 6 |
| (United States) Wenger x KWR | 33 | (United States) Kyle Wyman | 6 |
| (Australia) Joe Rascal Racing | 34 | (United States) Cody Wyman | 1–2 |
| (Australia) Joe Rascal Racing | 43 | (United States) James Rispoli | 6 |
| (Australia) Joe Rascal Racing | 51 | (Brazil) Eric Granado | All |
| (Australia) Joe Rascal Racing | 69 | (Australia) Archie McDonald | All |
| (Australia) Joe Rascal Racing | 81 | (Spain) Jordi Torres | 3–5 |

== Calendar ==
The 2026 season consists of six rounds held alongside selected MotoGP Grands Prix:

| Round | Date | Grand Prix | Circuit |
|---|---|---|---|
| 1 | 29 March | Red Bull Grand Prix of the United States | Circuit of the Americas, Austin |
| 2 | 31 May | Brembo Grand Prix of Italy | Autodromo Internazionale del Mugello, Scarperia e San Piero |
| 3 | 28 June | Tissot Grand Prix of the Netherlands | TT Circuit Assen, Assen |
| 4 | 9 August | (United Kingdom) Qatar Airways Grand Prix of Great Britain | Silverstone Circuit, Silverstone |
| 5 | 30 August | Michelin Grand Prix of Aragon | MotorLand Aragón, Alcañiz |
| 6 | 20 September | Qatar Airways Grand Prix of Austria | Red Bull Ring, Spielberg |

== Results and standings ==
Grands Prix

| Round | Grand Prix | Pole position | Fastest lap | Winning rider | Winning team |
|---|---|---|---|---|---|
| 1 | United States motorcycle Grand Prix | (Brazil) Eric Granado | (Brazil) Eric Granado | (Australia) Archie McDonald | (Australia) Joe Rascal Racing |
| 1 | United States motorcycle Grand Prix | (Brazil) Eric Granado | (Spain) Óscar Gutiérrez | (Spain) Óscar Gutiérrez | (Indonesia) Niti Racing |
| 2 | (Italy) Italian motorcycle Grand Prix | (Brazil) Eric Granado | (Spain) Óscar Gutiérrez | (Spain) Óscar Gutiérrez | (Indonesia) Niti Racing |
| 2 | (Italy) Italian motorcycle Grand Prix | (Brazil) Eric Granado | (Italy) Andrea Iannone | (Italy) Andrea Iannone | (Indonesia) Niti Racing |
| 3 | (Netherlands) Dutch TT | (Brazil) Eric Granado | (Brazil) Eric Granado | (Brazil) Eric Granado | (Australia) Joe Rascal Racing |
| 3 | (Netherlands) Dutch TT | (Brazil) Eric Granado | (Brazil) Eric Granado | (Spain) Óscar Gutiérrez | (Indonesia) Niti Racing |
| 4 | (United Kingdom) British motorcycle Grand Prix | (Australia) Archie McDonald | (Australia) Archie McDonald | (United Kingdom) Bradley Smith | (Italy) Parkingo Team |
| 4 | (United Kingdom) British motorcycle Grand Prix | (Australia) Archie McDonald | (Brazil) Eric Granado | (Australia) Archie McDonald | (Australia) Joe Rascal Racing |
| 5 | Aragon motorcycle Grand Prix | (Spain) Óscar Gutiérrez | (Italy) Andrea Iannone | (Italy) Andrea Iannone | (Indonesia) Niti Racing |
| 5 | Aragon motorcycle Grand Prix | (Spain) Óscar Gutiérrez | (Italy) Andrea Iannone | (Italy) Andrea Iannone | (Indonesia) Niti Racing |
| 6 | (Austria) Austrian motorcycle Grand Prix | (Brazil) Eric Granado | (Spain) Óscar Gutiérrez | (Spain) Óscar Gutiérrez | (Indonesia) Niti Racing |
| 6 | (Austria) Austrian motorcycle Grand Prix | (Brazil) Eric Granado | (Spain) Óscar Gutiérrez | (Brazil) Eric Granado | (Australia) Joe Rascal Racing |

=== Riders' standings ===
Scoring system

Points are awarded to the top fifteen finishers. A rider has to finish the race to earn points.

| Position | 1st | 2nd | 3rd | 4th | 5th | 6th | 7th | 8th | 9th | 10th | 11th | 12th | 13th | 14th | 15th |
| Points | 25 | 20 | 16 | 13 | 11 | 10 | 9 | 8 | 7 | 6 | 5 | 4 | 3 | 2 | 1 |

| Pos. | Rider | Team | USA (United States) | | ITA (Italy) | | NED (Netherlands) | | GBR (United Kingdom) | | ARA (Aragon) | | AUT (Austria) | | Pts |
|---|---|---|---|---|---|---|---|---|---|---|---|---|---|---|---|
| 1 | (Australia) Archie McDonald | Joe Rascal Racing | 1 | 3 | 3 | 3 | 4 | 5 | 2^{P F} | 1^{P} | 3 | 3 | 2 | 8 | 202 |
| 2 | (Spain) Óscar Gutiérrez | Niti Racing | 8 | 1^{F} | 1^{F} | 10 | 2 | 1 | 10 | 4 | 2^{P} | Ret^{P} | 1^{F} | 2^{F} | 193 |
| 3 | (Brazil) Eric Granado | Joe Rascal Racing | 6^{P F} | 2^{P} | 2^{P} | 2^{P} | 1^{P F} | 3^{P F} | 3 | 2^{F} | Ret | 2 | Ret^{P} | 1^{P} | 192 |
| 4 | (Italy) Andrea Iannone | Niti Racing | | | 4 | 1^{F} | 3 | 2 | 4 | 6 | 1^{F} | 1^{F} | Ret | 6 | 157 |
| 5 | (United States) Jake Lewis | Saddlemen Racing | 2 | 4 | 6 | 6 | 6 | 8 | 7 | 8 | Ret | 7 | 5 | 7 | 117 |
| 6 | (Italy) Filippo Rovelli | Parkingo Team | 3 | 5 | 5 | 4 | 7 | 10 | 9 | 10 | 6 | 6 | | | 99 |
| 7 | (United States) Travis Wyman | Saddlemen Racing | 5 | Ret | 8 | 9 | 10 | 9 | 8 | 9 | 7 | 8 | 9 | 11 | 83 |
| 8 | (Spain) Jordi Torres | Joe Rascal Racing | | | | | 5 | 4 | 5 | 3 | 4 | 4 | | | 77 |
| 9 | (United States) Maxwell Toth | Saddlemen Racing | | | | | | | 6 | 7 | 5 | 5 | 6 | 5 | 62 |
| 10 | (Indonesia) Dimas Ekky Pratama | Niti Racing | Ret | 7 | Ret | 5 | 9 | 6 | Ret | Ret | Ret | 9 | 7 | 9 | 60 |
| 11 | (United States) Cory West | Saddlemen Racing | 4 | 6 | 9 | 7 | 8 | 7 | | | | | | | 56 |
| 12 | (United Kingdom) Bradley Smith | Parkingo Team | | | | | | | 1 | 5 | | | | | 36 |
| 13 | (United States) Kyle Wyman | Wenger x KWR | | | | | | | | | | | 4 | 3 | 29 |
| 14 | (United States) James Rispoli | Joe Rascal Racing | | | | | | | | | | | 3 | 4 | 29 |
| 15 | (United States) Cody Wyman | Joe Rascal Racing | 7 | Ret | 7 | 8 | | | | | | | | | 26 |
| 16 | (United States) Max Flinders | Parkingo Team | | | | | | | | | | | 8 | 10 | 14 |
| Pos. | Rider | Team | USA (United States) | | ITA (Italy) | | NED (Netherlands) | | GBR (United Kingdom) | | ARA (Aragon) | | AUT (Austria) | | Pts |
