= 2022 MotoAmerica Twins Championship =

The 2022 MotoAmerica Twins Championship season was the 5th season of the Twins Cup class in MotoAmerica competition.

== Calendar and results ==
Round	Circuit	Date	Race 1 Winner	Race 2 Winner
1	(Florida) Daytona International Speedway	March 10–13	(United States) Blake Davis	(United States) Hayden Schultz
2	(Georgia (U.S. state)) Michelin Raceway Road Atlanta	April 22–24	(United States) Jody Barry	(No event)
3	Virginia International Raceway	May 20–22	(United States) Jody Barry	(United States) Jody Barry
4	(Wisconsin) Road America	June 11–13	(United States) Jody Barry	(No event)
5	(Washington (state)) The Ridge Motorsports Park	June 24–26	(United States) Anthony Mazziotto	(United States) Anthony Mazziotto
6	(California) WeatherTech Raceway Laguna Seca	July 8–10	(United States) Cory Ventura	(No event)
7	(Minnesota) Brainerd International Raceway	July 29–31	(United States) Cory Ventura	(No event)
8	(Pennsylvania) Pittsburgh International Race Complex	August 19–21	(United States) Blake Davis	(United States) Cory Ventura
9	New Jersey Motorsports Park	September 9–11	(United States) Blake Davis	(No event)
10	(Alabama) Barber Motorsports Park	September 23–25	(United States) Kaleb De Keyrel	(No event)

== Teams and riders ==
2022 Entry List
Team	Constructor	No.	Rider	Rounds
3D Motorsports	Aprilia	972	(United Kingdom) Steven Shakespeare	1, 5
3D Racing/JBJR Racing	Yamaha	191	(United States) Jeff Bean	3, 7, 8, 9,
419 Racing	Suzuki	728	(United States) Jerry Reeves	1, 4
626 Pack	Suzuki	626	(United States) Brian Mullins	4
789 Racing	Suzuki	789	(United States) Steven Smith	2, 4, 10
American Metalcraft Racing	Aprilia	747	(United States) Eddie Neubauer	7
BARTCON Racing	Yamaha	25	(South Africa) Dominic Doyle	1, 3, 4, 5, 6, 8, 9, 10
Basement Racing Team	Yamaha	113	(United States) Renee Stephenson	2, 4
Boda Racing/CRT	Suzuki	487	(United States) Kevin Boda	2, 3
Brown Town Racing	Suzuki	186	(United States) Chase Brown	2, 3, 8
Brown Town Racing	Suzuki	187	(United States) Reese Brown	2, 3
Carbon Smith	Aprilia	934	(United States) Ryan Smith	6
Catalyst Reaction Suspension/Rattler's Rock	Suzuki	215	(United States) Michael Kim	6
Cattanach Racing	Aprilia	221	(United States) Ian Cattanach	4, 8
Champ Racing	Suzuki	98	(United States) Jonathan Champ	7
Champ School BPR Yamaha	Yamaha	74	(United States) Bryce Prince	6
Chief Racing Team	Suzuki	996	(United States) Greg Reisinger	3, 8
Chiefs Racing Team	Suzuki	676	(United States) Cassidy Heiser	8, 9,
Chiefs Racing Team	Yamaha	676	(United States) Cassidy Heiser	8, 9,
Cupidos Contracting	Aprilia	526	(United States) Joe Cupido	2, 10
Cycle Pros Racing	Yamaha	198	(United States) Drew Vandal	7
Cycle Tech - Speed Weaponry	Yamaha	49	(United States) Hayden Schultz	All
Cycle Tech/Speed Weaponry/Mydigitallisting	Yamaha	43	(United States) James Rispoli	3, 6, 9, 10
Dairy Boys Racing	Aprilia	126	(United States) Nick Uselmann	4
Elite Garageworkz/MRP Motorsports	Aprilia	173	(United States) Brad Faas	1, 2, 3, 4, 7, 8, 9,
F’Cancer Racing	Yamaha	959	(United States) Trevor Cece	7
Fluidology	Aprilia	710	(United States) Thomas Ceparano	7
Ghetto Customs	Yamaha	128	(United States) Chris Parrish	4, 8
Hartluck Racing	Suzuki	36	(United States) Corey Hart	1, 2, 3, 4, 8
Hemingway Racing	Suzuki	464	(United States) Yaunce Long	2, 8
HeyNow Racing/CoatzyMoto/LatinWE	Yamaha	787	(Colombia) Michael Henao	All
J. Crossman Racing	Aprilia	21	(United States) Jacob Crossman	9,
JBJR Racing	Yamaha	191	(United States) Jeff Bean	3, 7, 8, 9,
JoeyO Racing	Yamaha	50	(United States) Bobby Bettencourt	1, 2, 4
KATO FAST Racing	Suzuki	864	(United States) Steve Yang	7
Kayes Kustom Cycles	Kawasaki	688	(United States) Edward Kaye	3, 4, 8
KingsKamp.com Racing	Yamaha	23	(United States) Gino Angella	1, 2, 3, 6
Kruzn1 Racing	Suzuki	898	(United States) Andrew Kruse	4, 7
Legacy Dental/Poly Evolution	Yamaha	31	(United States) Jeffrey Purk	1, 2, 3, 4, 5, 6, 7, 8, 9,
Lucky 13	Aprilia	133	(United States) Wesley Lakis	1, 2, 3, 4, 5, 6, 7, 8, 9,
McKnight Racing	Suzuki	791	(United States) Tony McKnight	2
Möth Touch	Suzuki	899	(United States) Alexander Steinhoff-Arnot	8
Mount Innovations Not Dunn Racing	Suzuki	236	(United States) Gabriel Mount	8
MP13 Racing	Yamaha	28	(United States) Cory Ventura	1, 2, 3, 4, 5, 6, 7, 8, 9,
N2 Racing/BobbleHeadMoto	Yamaha	22	(United States) Blake Davis	All
NJB Racing	Yamaha	142	(United States) Jamie Bishop	3
North East Cycle Outlet Racing/Trackday Winner	Yamaha	18	(United States) Jackson Blackmon	1, 2, 3
Pellnitz Racing	Suzuki	132	(United States) Jonathan Pellnitz	1
Pure Attitude Racing	Yamaha	37	(Malaysia) Liam MacDonald	All
Pure Attitude Racing	Yamaha	16	(United States) Trevor Standish	1, 2, 3, 4, 5, 6, 7, 9, 10
RB Racing	Aprilia	171	(United States) Ray Hofman	1, 2, 3, 4, 5, 7, 9, 10
Reed Racing 323	Suzuki	323	(United States) Eric Reed	8, 10
Ride More Co RBoM	Suzuki	119	(United States) Tyler Freeman	2
Riot Racing	Aprilia	190	(United States) Christopher Evans	2, 10
Robem Engineering	Aprilia	72	(United States) Benjamin Gloddy	1, 2, 3, 4, 5, 6, 8, 9, 10
Robem Engineering	Aprilia	79	(United States) Teagg Hobbs	1, 2, 3, 4, 5, 6, 8, 9, 10
Rodio Racing	Aprilia	516	(United States) Anthony Mazziotto	All
Rodio Racing	Aprilia	96	(United States) Gus Rodio	1, 2
Ruthless Racing Inc/Trev Deeley Motorcycles	Yamaha	229	(Canada) Darren James	1, 4, 5, 6, 10
Second Hand Moto	Aprilia	290	(United States) Branden Chaisorn	4
Sizzle Maniac Racing	Suzuki	124	(United States) Heather Trees	2
SP8S Racing	Aprilia	138	(United States) Chris Speights	3, 6, 8, 9,
Stein Racing/Team MIM	Suzuki	222	(United States) Brycen Stein	4
Team Biothermal	Yamaha	227	(Puerto Rico) Edwin Cosme	3
Team Coming In Hot	Suzuki	823	(United States) Jared Herbig	4
Team Futurestar Racing	Yamaha	161	(United States) Kyle Franz	4, 7
Ten Racing	Yamaha	10	(United States) Brett Donahue	7, 10
Tennyson Racing	Yamaha	618	(United States) Aaron Tennyson	1, 2, 3
Tigertail USA Racing	Yamaha	24	(United States) Adam Faussett	All
Top Pro Motorsports	Aprilia	372	(United States) Michael Blaum	2
Trees Racing	Suzuki	54	(United States) Jared Trees	1, 4, 8, 10
Triple M	Suzuki	520	(United States) John Knowles	1, 2, 3, 4, 5, 6, 7, 10
Underground Team Racing	Suzuki	193	(United States) Chris Haesemeyer	4, 10
UNIT F14/BISON	Aprilia	545	(United States) Chandler Slagle	6, 10
Veloce Racing	Aprilia	234	(Italy) Edoardo Mazzuoli	5, 6
Veloce Racing	Aprilia	11	(United States) Jody Barry	All
Veloce Racing	Aprilia	1	(United States) Kaleb De Keyrel	All
Vestment Realty	Yamaha	310	(United States) Rodney Vest	1, 2, 3, 4, 8, 9, 10
Williams Racing	Aprilia	247	(United States) Graham Williams	7
Wrench Motorcycles	Yamaha	34	(United States) Cody Wyman	3, 4, 5, 6, 7, 8, 9,
Wrench Motorcycles	Yamaha	15	(United States) Ethan Cook	1, 2
Wrench Motorcycles	Yamaha	18	(United States) Jackson Blackmon	1, 2, 3

== Championship standings ==
Scoring system

Points are awarded to the top fifteen finishers. A rider has to finish the race to earn points.

Position	1st	2nd	3rd	4th	5th	6th	7th	8th	9th	10th	11th	12th	13th	14th	15th
Points	25	20	16	13	11	10	9	8	7	6	5	4	3	2	1

Pos	Rider	Bike	DAY (Florida)		RAT (Georgia (U.S. state))	VIR (Virginia)		RAM (Wisconsin)	RID (Washington (state))		MON (California)	BRA (Minnesota)	PIT (Pennsylvania)		NJE (New Jersey)	ALA (Alabama)	Pts
Pos	Rider	Bike	R1	R2	R1	R1	R2	R1	R1	R2	R1	R1	R1	R2	R1	R1	Pts
1	(United States) Blake Davis	Yamaha	1	Ret	5	8	9	4	5	4	2	2	1	2	1	4	211
2	(United States) Jody Barry	Aprilia	5	2	1	1	1	1	4	Ret	Ret	5	10	9	4	6	191
3	(United States) Anthony Mazziotto	Aprilia	3	5	7	4	5	2	1	1	6	3	6	10	5	8	191
4	(United States) Kaleb De Keyrel	Aprilia	13	8	6	5	4	7	2	10	3	4	2	5	6	1	175
5	(United States) Hayden Schultz	Yamaha	Ret	1	31	3	2	8	3	2	Ret	6	3	8	Ret	7	148
6	(United States) Cory Ventura	Yamaha	Ret	Ret	8	20	7	5	6	5	1	1	7	1	7		142
7	(United States) Teagg Hobbs	Aprilia	2	4	2	10	12	Ret	Ret	7	10		9	7	3	2	130
8	(United States) Benjamin Gloddy	Aprilia	Ret	7	3	7	10	Ret	Ret	6	4		4	6	2	3	122
9	(United States) Cody Wyman	Yamaha				9	8	6	7	3	8	7	8	4	Ret		88
10	(South Africa) Dominic Doyle	Yamaha	6	Ret		Ret	11	3	Ret	Ret	Ret		5	3	Ret	5	69
11	(Colombia) Michael Henao	Yamaha	12	11	DNS	11	15	9	8	8	11	9	11	Ret	9	10	68
12	(United States) Jackson Blackmon	Yamaha	4	6	4	6	6										56
13	(United States) James Rispoli	Yamaha				2	3				5				DNS	9	54
14	(Malaysia) Liam MacDonald	Yamaha	24	20	13	13	16	14	9	9	12	DNS	15	14	11	11	39
15	(United States) Ray Hofman	Aprilia		12	11	14	14	10	12	15		11			DNS	13	32
16	(United States) John Knowles	Suzuki	16	13	9	12	13	Ret	11	DNS	14	16				17	24
17	(Canada) Darren James	Yamaha	8	Ret				12	Ret	11	Ret					12	21
18	(Italy) Tommaso Marcon	Aprilia	Ret	16													16
19	(United States) Cassidy Heiser	Yamaha											13	11	8		16
20	(United States) Jared Trees	Suzuki	10	Ret				15					12	13		14	16
21	(United States) Gus Rodio	Aprilia	7	10	DNS												15
22	(United States) Jeffrey Purk	Yamaha	14	Ret	14	17	18	16	DSQ	14	16	12	17	15	13		14
23	(Italy) Edoardo Mazzuoli	Aprilia							10	Ret	9						13
24	(United States) Trevor Standish	Yamaha	18	19	10	Ret	17	11	Ret	DNS	Ret	Ret			14	18	13
25	(United States) Ethan Cook	Yamaha	11	9	Ret												12
26	(United States) Bryce Prince	Yamaha									7						9
27	(United States) Adam Faussett	Yamaha	17	Ret	16	Ret	24	25	13	13	17	14	19	17	15	24	9
28	(United States) Wesley Lakis	Aprilia		14	DNS	19	Ret	24	14	12	Ret	18	20	19	DNS		8
29	(United States) Brett Donahue	Yamaha										8				21	8
30	(United States) Chris Parrish	Yamaha						13						12			7
31	(United States) Edward Sullivan	Yamaha	9	Ret													7
32	(United States) Jacob Crossman	Aprilia													10		6
33	(United States) Eddie Neubauer	Aprilia										10					6
34	(United States) Corey Hart	Suzuki	19	18	12	15	20	20						20			5
35	(United States) Chris Speights	Aprilia				22	23				18		21	18	12		4
36	(United States) Chase Brown	Suzuki			15	16	Ret						14				3
37	(United States) Trevor Cece	Yamaha										13					3
38	(United States) Ari Henning	Yamaha									13						3
39	(United States) Joseph Mariniello	Aprilia														15	1
40	(United States) Steve Yang	Suzuki										15					1
41	(United States) Ryan Smith	Aprilia									15						1
42	(United Kingdom) Steven Shakespeare	Aprilia	27	16					15	16							1
43	(United States) Brad Faas	Aprilia	15	Ret	25	25	Ret	31				21	24	24	18		1
44	(United States) Gino Angella	Yamaha	23	15	24	21	27				19						1
45	(United States) Edward Kaye	Kawasaki				26	26	26					18				0
46	(United States) Zach Thomas	Suzuki														Ret	0
47	(United States) Branden Chaisorn	Aprilia						35									0
48	(United States) Alexander Steinhoff-Arnot	Suzuki											22				0
49	(United States) Yaunce Long	Suzuki			30								26				0
50	(United States) Andrew Kruse	Suzuki						28				Ret					0
51	(United States) Kyle Franz	Yamaha						30				Ret					0
52	(United States) Jonathan Champ	Suzuki										Ret					0
53	(United States) Michael Kim	Suzuki									Ret						0
54	(United States) Aaron Tennyson	Yamaha	Ret	Ret	Ret	DNS	DNS										0
55	(United States) Kevin Boda	Suzuki			22	24	Ret										0
56	(United States) Tyler Freeman	Suzuki			DNS												0
57	(United States) Joe Melendez	Suzuki	20	Ret													0
58	(United States) Danny Dominguez	Aprilia	26	Ret													0
59	(United States) Alex Arango	Aprilia														16	0
60	(United States) Ian Cattanach	Aprilia						22					16	16			0
61	(United States) Graham Williams	Aprilia										17					0
62	(United States) Jonathan Pellnitz	Suzuki	22	17													0
63	(United States) Jeff Bean	Yamaha				Ret	DNS					20	23	22	17		0
64	(United States) Drew Vandal	Yamaha										19					0
65	(United States) Nick Uselmann	Aprilia						18									0
66	(United States) Chris Haesemeyer	Suzuki						17								19	0
67	(United States) Brian Mullins	Suzuki						19									0
68	(United States) Jamie Bishop	Yamaha				Ret	19										0
69	(United States) Christopher Evans	Aprilia			17											20	0
70	(United States) Thomas Ceparano	Aprilia										22					0
71	(Puerto Rico) Edwin Cosme	Yamaha				Ret	21										0
72	(United States) Michael Blaum	Aprilia			21												0
73	(United States) Steven Smith	Suzuki			19			21								22	0
74	(United States) Reese Brown	Suzuki			18	18	22										0
75	(United States) Chandler Slagle	Aprilia									20					23	0
76	(United States) Jerry Reeves	Suzuki	21	Ret				23									0
77	(United States) Heather Trees	Suzuki			23												0
78	(United States) Eric Reed	Suzuki											27	21		25	0
79	(United States) Gabriel Mount	Suzuki												25			0
80	(United States) Rodney Vest	Yamaha	28		28	27	28	32					25	23	16	26	0
81	(United States) Greg Reisinger	Suzuki				28	29							26			0
82	(United States) Tony McKnight	Suzuki			26												0
83	(United States) Joe Cupido	Aprilia			29											27	0
84	(United States) Brycen Stein	Suzuki						27									0
85	(United States) Jared Herbig	Suzuki						29									0
86	(United States) Renee Stephenson	Yamaha			27												0
87	(United States) Bobby Bettencourt	Yamaha	25	21	20												0
Pos	Rider	Bike	DAY (Florida)		RAT (Georgia (U.S. state))	VIR (Virginia)		RAM (Wisconsin)	RID (Washington (state))		MON (California)	BRA (Minnesota)	PIT (Pennsylvania)		NJE (New Jersey)	ALA (Alabama)	Pts
