= James Rispoli (motorcyclist) =

American motorcycle racer

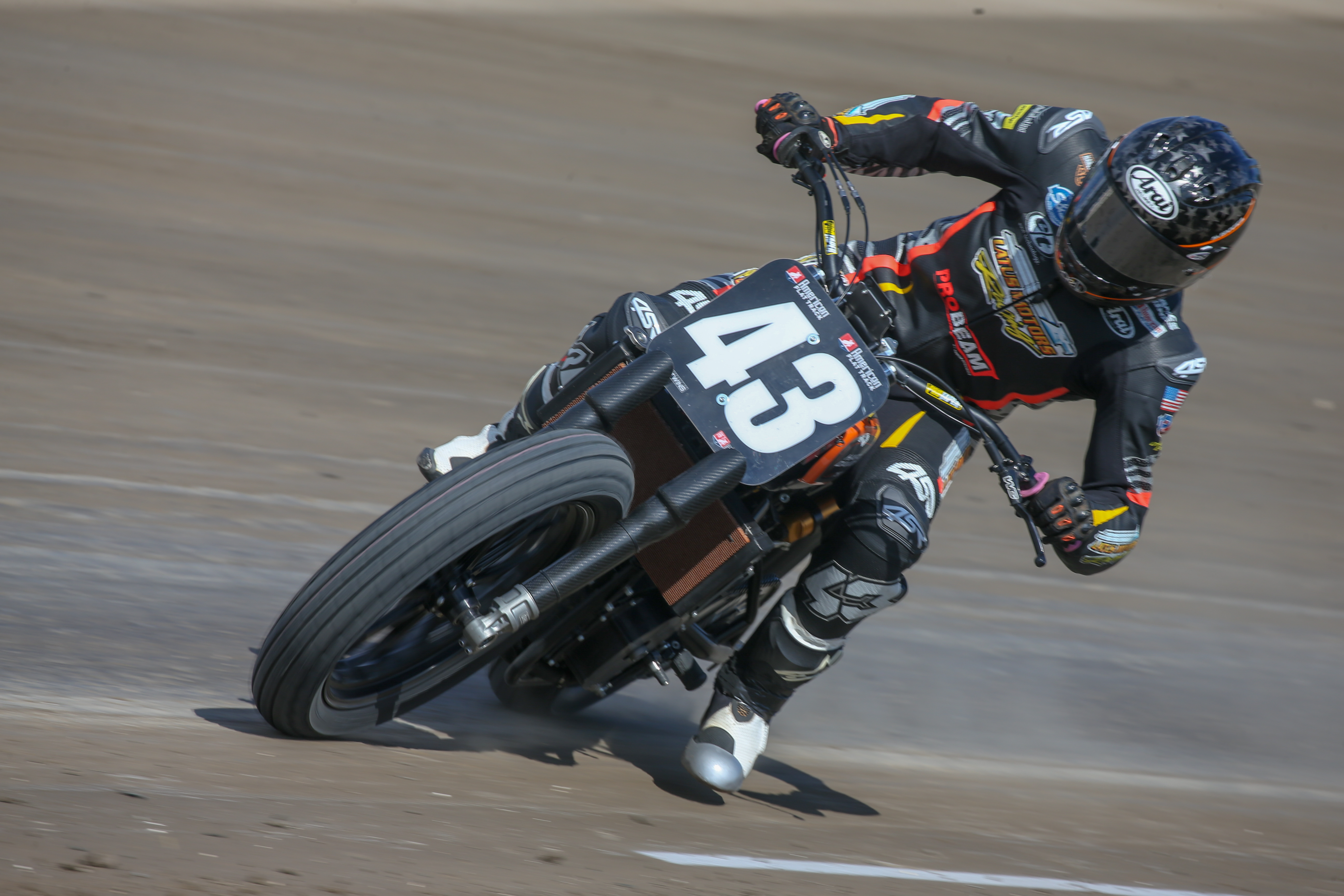
- Rispoli racing for AFT Production Twins in 2020
- Born: July 19, 1991 (age 35); Londonderry, New Hampshire, United States
- Current team: Joe Rascal Racing
- Bike number: 43
Motorcycle racing career statistics
Moto2 World Championship
Active years	2013
Manufacturers	Mistral 610
Championships	0
2013 championship position	NC (0 pts)
Starts / Wins / Podiums / Poles / F. laps / Points; 1 / 0 / 0 / 0 / 0 / 0
British Superbike Championship
Active years	2016
Manufacturers	Yamaha
Championships	0
2016 championship position	27th (3 pts)
Starts / Wins / Podiums / Poles / F. laps / Points; 21 / 0 / 0 / 0 / 0 / 3
British Supersport Championship
Active years	2015
Manufacturers	Yamaha
Championships	0
2015 championship position	5th (256 pts)
Starts / Wins / Podiums / Poles / F. laps / Points; 24 / 0 / 6 / 1 / 2 / 256

James Rispoli (born July 19, 1991 in Londonderry, New Hampshire, United States) is an American motorcycle racer.

Rispoli is also a two-time AMA Supersport Champion, he was champion of the AMA Supersport East Championship in 2011, and also champion of the AMA Supersport West Championship in 2012.

Rispoli made his Moto2 World Championship debut for Michigan-based team GPTech riding a Tech 3 bike. but was registered by the team as Mistral 610, the real name of the bike, due to the team racing as privateer, he qualified 29th and finished 25th in the race behind the Tech 3 riders Danny Kent and Louis Rossi.

== Career statistics ==
- 2009: 20th, AMA Pro Supersport East Championship #71 Suzuki GSX-R600
- 2010: 8th, AMA Pro Supersport East Championship #17 Suzuki GSX-R600
- 2011: 1st, AMA Pro Supersport East Championship #43 Suzuki GSX-R600
- 2011: 1st, AMA Pro Supersport National Championship #43 Suzuki GSX-R600
- 2012: 1st, AMA Pro Supersport West Championship #1 Suzuki GSX-R600
- 2012: 1st, AMA Pro Supersport National Championship #1 Suzuki GSX-R600
- 2013: 7th, AMA Pro Daytona SportBike Championship #43 Suzuki GSX-R600
- 2014: 9th, British Supersport Championship #43 Suzuki GSX-R600 / Yamaha YZF-R6
- 2015: 5th, British Supersport Championship #43 Yamaha YZF-R6
- 2017: 10th, British National Superstock 1000 Championship #43 Kawasaki ZX-10R
- 2018: British Supersport Championship #43 Yamaha YZF-R6

=== Grand Prix motorcycle racing ===
==== By season ====
Season	Class	Motorcycle	Team	Number	Race	Win	Podium	Pole	FLap	Pts	Plcd
2013	Moto2	Mistral 610	GP Tech	43	1	0	0	0	0	0	NC
Total					**1**	**0**	**0**	**0**	**0**	**0**	

==== Races by year ====
(key)

Year	Class	Bike	1	2	3	4	5	6	7	8	9	10	11	12	13	14	15	16	17	Pos	Pts
2013	Moto2	Mistral 610	QAT	AME	SPA	FRA	ITA	CAT	NED	GER	INP; 24	CZE	GBR	RSM	ARA	MAL	AUS	JPN	VAL	NC	0

=== British Supersport Championship ===
(key) (Races in bold indicate pole position; races in italics indicate fastest lap)

Year	Bike	1	2	3	4	5	6	7	8	9	10	11	12	13	14	15	16	17	18	19	20	21	22	23	24	Pos	Pts
2015	Yamaha	DON; Ret	DON; 7	BRH; Ret	BRH; 5	OUL; Ret	OUL; Ret	SNE; 4	SNE; 2	KNO; 5	KNO; 6	BRH; 4	BRH; 4	THR; 3	**THR**; Ret	CAD; 4	CAD; 4	OUL; 5	OUL; 2	ASS; 2	ASS; Ret	SIL; 2	SIL; 2	BRH; 4	BRH; 6	5th	256

=== British Superbike Championship ===
==== By year ====
(key) (Races in bold indicate pole position; races in italics indicate fastest lap)

Year	Make	1		2		3		4		5		6		7		8		9			10		11		12			Pos	Pts
Year	Make	R1	R2	R1	R2	R1	R2	R1	R2	R1	R2	R1	R2	R1	R2	R1	R2	R1	R2	R3	R1	R2	R1	R2	R1	R2	R3	Pos	Pts
2016	Yamaha	SIL; Ret	SIL; DNS	OUL; 19	OUL; 16	BHI; Ret	BHI; DNS	KNO; 23	KNO; 17	SNE; 13	SNE; 19	THR; Ret	THR; 21	BHGP; 18	BHGP; 17	CAD; 17	CAD; 17	OUL; 17	OUL; Ret	OUL; 17	DON; Ret	DON; DNS	ASS; Ret	ASS; 22	BHGP; DNS	BHGP; 17	BHGP; DNS	27th	3

=== MotoAmerica Twins Championship ===
==== Races by year ====
Year	Class	Bike	1	2	3	4	5	6	7	8	9	10	11	12	13	14	Pos	Pts
2022	Twins	Yamaha	DAY	DAY	ATL	VIR; 2	VIR; 3	RAM	RID	RID	MON	BRA	PIT	PIT	NJR	ALA	13th	10

=== Harley-Davidson Bagger World Cup ===
==== Races by year ====
(key) (Races in bold indicate pole position, races in italics indicate fastest lap)

Year	1		2		3		4		5		6		Pos	Pts
Year	R1	R2	R1	R2	R1	R2	R1	R2	R1	R2	R1	R2	Pos	Pts
2026	USA	USA	ITA	ITA	NED	NED	GBR	GBR	SPA	SPA	AUT; 3	AUT; 4	13th	29
