= Be Wiser Insurance =

British insurance broker

- Industry: Insurance
- Founded: 2007
- Headquarters: Andover, England
- Products: Car/Van/Bike/Home Insurance
- Website: https://www.bewiser.co.uk/

Be Wiser Insurance is an insurance broker, founded in 2007. The company is Financial Conduct Authority approved and a member of the British Insurance Brokers Association (BIBA). They offer a range of insurance products from a panel of UK insurers covering car, bike, van, domestic, business and commercial insurance.

== Staff, Training and Development ==
Be Wiser Insurance is based in Andover. Their headquarters were officially opened by Sir George Young, 6th Baronet. The current number of employees totals over 600 staff in six offices across Andover, Hampshire.

The company opened a new office in Swindon in June, 2016, promising 350 new jobs for the area.

Be Wiser has 280 Apprentices and is one of the UK's Top 100 Apprenticeship Providers. In 2014 Be Wiser was rewarded nationally for their apprenticeship programmes; HeadStart, FreshStart, SureStart and KickStart. As well as providing professional training and development for its employees Be Wiser also trains and develops external candidates from across the Insurance sector through its Chartered Insurance Institute (CII) training centre.

Be Wiser are the first insurance broker to have developed a BA (Hons) Insurance Degree Programme, thanks to the introduction of The Be Wiser Uni for Insurance (BUFI) whose degree programme is accredited by The University of Chichester. BUFI also incorporates Level 2 & 3 Apprenticeships.

== Awards ==
- 2011, 2012, 2013, Be Wiser ranked in the Sunday Times Fast Track 100 Awards for privately owned companies, sponsored by the Virgin Group.
- In 2012 Be Wiser was ranked in the Business Magazine Solent Top 250 private companies, receiving the "Rising Star of the Year" Award for recognition of staff training and investment.
- 2013 The Sunday Times PwC Profit Track 100 awards
- 2014 Winners of the National Apprenticeship Award & Top 100 Apprenticeship Employers
- 2014 Winners of the Insurance Times Training Excellence & Impact Award
- 2015 Winners of the Rolls-Royce Award for Newcomer Large Employer of the Year
- 2016 UK Broker Awards - Broker Personality of Year (Mark Bower-Dyke)
- 2017 Winners of the Insurance Times Excellence In Training - Broker Award
- 2017 Winner of the Inspire 17 Apprentice of the Year Award
- 2018 Winners of the Insurance Times Excellence In Professional Development Award
- 2020 Winners of the Feefo Platinum Trusted Service Award

== Sponsorship ==
Be Wiser Insurance has sponsored several sports teams and events.

=== Be Wiser Ducati (2016 - 2019) ===
Be Wiser Insurance sponsored a British Superbike Racing Team Be Wiser Ducati - owned by Paul Bird Motorsport.

The 2016, 2017, and 2018 seasons featured Shane "Shakey" Byrne and Glenn Irwin riding a Ducati Panigale R for the team, with Glenn's younger brother Andrew Irwin joining the team as a replacement rider for the injured Shakey in the 2018 season.

The 2019 season saw a completely new line up for the team, with 2015 BSB winner Josh Brooks and MotoGP rider Scott Redding joining the PBM Be Wiser Ducati Race Team. The 2019 season saw not only new riders for the team, but a new bike, with both riders climbing aboard the Ducati Panigale V4 R.

Be Wiser concluded its partnership with the PBM Ducati Racing Team in 2019, with their final season as sponsor seeing Scott Redding win the BSB Championship.

=== Be Wiser Kawasaki (2012 - 2015) ===
Previously, the company sponsored a Superstock (2013–14) and later, a British Superbike Racing (2015) Team - Be Wiser Kawasaki. The team was managed by previous British Superbike Champion 2011, Tommy Hill, with riders consisting of Chris Walker (motorcycle racer) and Danny Buchan. The team rode a Kawasaki Ninja ZX-10R - notable for its unusual yellow and black livery. Be Wiser Kawasaki withdrew from the 2015 BSB season due to lack of financial backing.

=== Other Sponsorship ===
- 2008 - Current. Sponsors & supporters of Newbury Race Course Annual Race Day at Newbury Racecourse
- 2012 - 2018. Match day sponsors and club partner of Reading Football Club
- 2012 - 2014. Kawasaki Superstock Series
- 2015. Be Wiser Kawasaki British Super Bikes
- 2015 April. Newbury Race Course, Spring Cup
- 2015 June. Hampshire PGA Stroke Play Championships
- 2015 - Current. Be Wiser Ducati BSB Racing Team.
- 2015 - 2016. National Badminton League
- 2017 - Current. Star Sixes Tournament
- 2015 - Current. Hawkstone International Motocross
- 2016 - Current. Swindon Town FC
- 2016 - Current. All-Weather Championships

== Be Wiser Owl ==
As part of their 10th anniversary, the Be Wiser Owl could also be seen on Europe’s largest freestanding LED advertising boards.

During 2017 Be Wiser donated small torches and reflective stickers featuring its distinctive owl logo to local schools.

== Charity Support and Fundraising Activities ==
Be Wiser Insurance has been involved in several fundraising activities, including:

- 2019/20 support of three charities: Andover Mind, RSPCA North Wiltshire and Ronald McDonald House Charities UK
- 2018/19 support of four charities: Salisbury District Stars Appeal, Macular Society, Blue Cross and Cheery Boxes
- 2017/18 support of three charities: Hampshire and Isle of Wight Air Ambulance, Brighter Futures and Alzheimer's Research UK - Various fundraising activities raising over £9,000
- 2016/17 support of three charities: The British Heart Foundation, Naomi House and The Countess of Brecknock Hospice - Various fundraising activities raising over £9,000
- Test Valley Arts Foundation "Andover Voices and Stories"
- The Andover Young Carers awarded £2000 by Be Wiser Insurance
- Be Wiser Insurance has raised a total of £2,086 for The British Heart Foundation and The British Lung Foundation

== Coverbox acquisition ==
Telematics insurer went into administration in July 2019 and Be Wiser incorporated its customer base into their Drive Wiser branding.
