= 2016 British Superbike Championship =

British motorcycle racing season

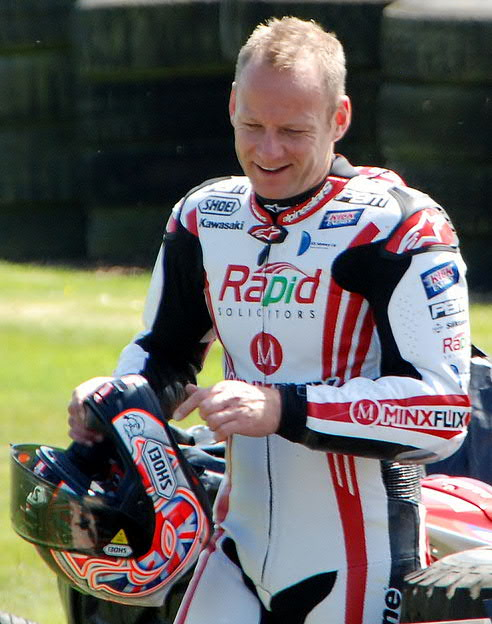
2016 champion, Shane Byrne

The 2016 British Superbike Championship season was the 29th British Superbike Championship season. It began at Silverstone on 8 April and ended at the Brands Hatch GP circuit on 16 October. Josh Brookes, and his team Milwaukee Yamaha, were the previous champions but neither defended their titles and instead competed in World Superbikes. 'Shakey' Shane Byrne regained the BSB Championship Title onboard a Be Wiser sponsored Ducati 1199 Panigale from Paul Bird Motorsport.

== Teams and riders ==
Team	Constructor	No.	Rider	Rounds
Be Wiser Ducati	Ducati	2	(Northern Ireland) Glenn Irwin	All
Be Wiser Ducati	Ducati	67	(England) Shane Byrne	All
FS-3 Racing	Kawasaki	3	(Australia) Billy McConnell	All
Honda Racing	Honda	4	(England) Dan Linfoot	All
Honda Racing	Honda	20	(England) Jenny Tinmouth	All
Honda Racing	Honda	22	(Australia) Jason O'Halloran	All
ePayMe Yamaha	Yamaha	5	(Scotland) Stuart Easton	1–6
ePayMe Yamaha	Yamaha	15	(United States) John Hopkins	1–4, 7–12
ePayMe Yamaha	Yamaha	32	(Australia) Broc Parkes	5, 7, 9, 11–12
ePayMe Yamaha	Yamaha	43	(England) Howie Mainwaring-Smart	8
Lloyd's British Moto Rapido	Ducati	5	(Scotland) Stuart Easton	8–10
Lloyd's British Moto Rapido	Ducati	53	(Italy) Alessandro Polita	11–12
Lloyd's British Moto Rapido	Ducati	83	(England) Danny Buchan	1–7
Buildbase BMW	BMW	6	(Northern Ireland) Michael Dunlop	1–2
Buildbase BMW	BMW	14	(England) Lee Jackson	All
Buildbase BMW	BMW	47	(England) Richard Cooper	All
Tyco BMW	BMW	7	(Northern Ireland) Michael Laverty	All
Tyco BMW	BMW	11	(England) Ian Hutchinson	11
Tyco BMW	BMW	24	(England) Christian Iddon	All
Anvil Hire TAG Racing	Yamaha	8	(England) Shaun Winfield	All
Anvil Hire TAG Racing	Yamaha	43	(England) Howie Mainwaring-Smart	12
Anvil Hire TAG Racing	Yamaha	71	(United States) James Rispoli	All
Quattro Plant Kawasaki	Kawasaki	12	(England) Luke Mossey	All
Quattro Plant Kawasaki	Kawasaki	99	(Sweden) Filip Backlund	2–12
Team WD-40	Kawasaki	16	(Australia) Josh Hook	4–12
Team WD-40	Kawasaki	44	(Republic of Ireland) Jack Kennedy	1–3, 5–9
Team WD-40	Kawasaki	94	(England) Sam Hornsey	1
Bennetts Suzuki	Suzuki	23	(Japan) Ryuichi Kiyonari	1–7
Bennetts Suzuki	Suzuki	46	(England) Tommy Bridewell	All
Smiths Racing BMW	BMW	23	(Japan) Ryuichi Kiyonari	9–12
Smiths Racing BMW	BMW	43	(England) Howie Mainwaring-Smart	1–6
Smiths Racing BMW	BMW	81	(England) Luke Stapleford	6
Smiths Racing BMW	BMW	96	(Czech Republic) Jakub Smrž	All
Lloyd & Jones PR Racing	BMW	25	(Czech Republic) Matej Smrž	2–3
Lloyd & Jones PR Racing	BMW	26	(England) Josh Wainwright	4–12
Royal Air Force Regular & Reserves	BMW	27	(England) Jake Dixon	4–12
Royal Air Force Regular & Reserves	BMW	34	(Northern Ireland) Alastair Seeley	All
Gearlink Kawasaki	Kawasaki	31	(Italy) Vittorio Iannuzzo	All
Riders Motorcycles BMW	BMW	40	(England) Martin Jessopp	1–2, 4–9, 11–12
JG Speedfit Kawasaki	Kawasaki	60	(England) Peter Hickman	All
JG Speedfit Kawasaki	Kawasaki	91	(England) Leon Haslam	All
JG Speedfit Kawasaki	Kawasaki	77	(England) James Ellison	All
Platform Hire Yamaha	Yamaha	64	(England) Aaron Zanotti	All
Tsingtao MSS Performance Kawasaki	Kawasaki	83	(England) Danny Buchan	8–9
Motodex Performance First	BMW	95	(England) Michael Howarth	2, 5

== Race calendar and results ==
2016 calendar
Main Season
Round		Circuit	Date	Pole position	Fastest lap	Winning rider	Winning team
1	R1	(England) Silverstone Arena GP	10 April	(England) Leon Haslam	(England) Dan Linfoot	(Northern Ireland) Michael Laverty	Tyco BMW
1	R2	(England) Silverstone Arena GP	10 April		(England) Peter Hickman	(England) Peter Hickman	JG Speedfit Kawasaki
2	R1	(England) Oulton Park	2 May	(England) Leon Haslam	(Northern Ireland) Michael Laverty	(England) Leon Haslam	JG Speedfit Kawasaki
2	R2	(England) Oulton Park	2 May		(England) James Ellison	(England) Richard Cooper	Buildbase BMW Motorrad
3	R1	(England) Brands Hatch Indy	22 May	(England) Luke Mossey	(England) Luke Mossey	(England) Leon Haslam	JG Speedfit Kawasaki
3	R2	(England) Brands Hatch Indy	22 May		(England) Shane Byrne	(England) Shane Byrne	Be Wiser Ducati
4	R1	(Scotland) Knockhill	26 June	(England) Shane Byrne	(England) Dan Linfoot	(England) Leon Haslam	JG Speedfit Kawasaki
4	R2	(Scotland) Knockhill	26 June		(England) James Ellison	(England) Shane Byrne	Be Wiser Ducati
5	R1	(England) Snetterton 300	10 July	(England) Shane Byrne	(England) Shane Byrne	(Australia) Jason O'Halloran	Honda Racing
5	R2	(England) Snetterton 300	10 July		(England) Dan Linfoot	(England) Shane Byrne	Be Wiser Ducati
6	R1	(England) Thruxton	24 July	(England) Shane Byrne	(England) Shane Byrne	(England) Shane Byrne	Be Wiser Ducati
6	R2	(England) Thruxton	24 July		(England) Dan Linfoot	(Northern Ireland) Michael Laverty	Tyco BMW
7	R1	(England) Brands Hatch GP	7 August	(England) Luke Mossey	(England) Luke Mossey	(England) Shane Byrne	Be Wiser Ducati
7	R2	(England) Brands Hatch GP	7 August		(England) Shane Byrne	(England) Shane Byrne	Be Wiser Ducati
8	R1	(England) Cadwell Park	29 August	(England) Leon Haslam	(England) Leon Haslam	(England) Shane Byrne	Be Wiser Ducati
8	R2	(England) Cadwell Park	29 August		(England) Leon Haslam	(England) Leon Haslam	JG Speedfit Kawasaki
9	R1	(England) Oulton Park	10 September	(England) Shane Byrne	(England) Leon Haslam	(England) Leon Haslam	JG Speedfit Kawasaki
9	R2	(England) Oulton Park	11 September		(Australia) Jason O'Halloran	(England) Leon Haslam	JG Speedfit Kawasaki
9	R3	(England) Oulton Park	11 September		(England) Christian Iddon	(England) Leon Haslam	JG Speedfit Kawasaki
The Showdown
10	R1	(England) Donington Park	18 September	(England) Leon Haslam	(England) Shane Byrne	(England) Shane Byrne	Be Wiser Ducati
10	R2	(England) Donington Park	18 September		(England) Shane Byrne	(England) Shane Byrne	Be Wiser Ducati
11	R1	(Netherlands) TT Circuit Assen	2 October	(England) Shane Byrne	(Australia) Jason O'Halloran	(England) Leon Haslam	JG Speedfit Kawasaki
11	R2	(Netherlands) TT Circuit Assen	2 October		(England) Shane Byrne	(England) Leon Haslam	JG Speedfit Kawasaki
12	R1	(England) Brands Hatch GP	15 October	(England) Tommy Bridewell	(England) Christian Iddon	(England) Peter Hickman	JG Speedfit Kawasaki
12	R2	(England) Brands Hatch GP	16 October		(England) James Ellison	(England) James Ellison	JG Speedfit Kawasaki
12	R3	(England) Brands Hatch GP	16 October		(England) Shane Byrne	(England) James Ellison	JG Speedfit Kawasaki

== Championship standings ==
=== Riders' championship ===
Pos	Rider	Bike	SIL (England)		OUL (England)		BRH (England)		KNO (Scotland)		SNE (England)		THR (England)		BRH (England)		CAD (England)		OUL (England)			DON (England)		ASS (Netherlands)		BRH (England)			Pts
Pos	Rider	Bike	R1	R2	R1	R2	R1	R2	R1	R2	R1	R2	R1	R2	R1	R2	R1	R2	R1	R2	R3	R1	R2	R1	R2	R1	R2	R3	Pts
The Championship Showdown
1	(England) Shane Byrne	Ducati	2	2	8	6	9	1	**Ret**	1	**3**	**1**	**1**	**Ret**	1	1	1	3	**9**	Ret	5	1	**1**	**2**	2	6	6	3	669
2	(England) Leon Haslam	Kawasaki	**Ret**	5	**1**	3	1	3	1	6	5	4	13	5	2	2	**2**	**1**	1	**1**	1	**2**	Ret	1	1	Ret	5	4	640
3	(England) James Ellison	Kawasaki	13	8	3	4	2	Ret	7	2	Ret	Ret	5	7	10	9	6	8	2	2	Ret	4	7	3	7	Ret	1	**1**	610
4	(England) Dan Linfoot	Honda	5	**9**	Ret	Ret	10	5	2	**3**	2	2	Ret	9	7	8	Ret	6	5	3	Ret	7	2	4	4	4	4	6	602
5	(Australia) Jason O'Halloran	Honda	6	4	4	8	8	6	9	5	1	5	6	2	4	3	3	2	4	4	**Ret**	3	Ret	5	**3**	Ret	9	11	568
6	(England) Luke Mossey	Kawasaki	4	10	16	Ret	**5**	**10**	3	12	7	13	3	4	**3**	**7**	12	9	7	5	2	Ret	8	7	5	13	10	9	550
BSB Riders Cup
7	(England) Peter Hickman	Kawasaki	Ret	1	12	12	7	8	5	4	Ret	8	12	6	11	11	7	4	3	7	7	5	4	16	14	1	3	12	233
8	(Northern Ireland) Michael Laverty	BMW	1	6	6	**5**	6	Ret	8	21	Ret	3	2	1	14	Ret	10	12	8	Ret	4	10	13	6	6	11	16	16	202
9	(England) Christian Iddon	BMW	3	3	2	2	11	7	14	10	19	6	21	13	9	10	Ret	Ret	Ret	11	9	8	3	12	8	2	**Ret**	5	199
10	(England) Richard Cooper	BMW	12	11	9	1	4	2	6	7	Ret	11	8	Ret	8	5	8	Ret	6	12	6	6	5	8	10	Ret	Ret	15	193
11	(England) Tommy Bridewell	Suzuki	10	16	15	14	3	4	12	8	8	10	4	8	Ret	Ret	4	5	Ret	6	3	Ret	6	17	16	**5**	8	8	172
12	(Northern Ireland) Glenn Irwin	Ducati	14	13	13	7	13	Ret	11	Ret	Ret	7	11	3	Ret	4	5	7	Ret	9	11	13	10	11	12	3	7	17	143
13	(England) Lee Jackson	BMW	8	7	14	13	15	12	13	15	10	15	Ret	10	5	6	Ret	11	10	Ret	8	12	11	15	13	8	13	Ret	108
14	(United States) John Hopkins	Yamaha	9	Ret	11	Ret	12	11	4	Ret					15	Ret	14	15	12	Ret	Ret	9	Ret	10	15	7	2	2	105
15	(Australia) Billy McConnell	Kawasaki	16	Ret	10	Ret	Ret	16	Ret	Ret	4	14	22	19	12	16	13	13	Ret	17	12	Ret	9	13	17	12	Ret	14	51
16	(England) Jake Dixon	BMW							Ret	13	6	12	17	16	13	12	9	10	11	8	Ret								50
17	(England) Danny Buchan	Ducati	7	Ret	DNS	DNS	Ret	15	10	11	12	9	Ret	Ret	Ret	15													48
17	(England) Danny Buchan	Kawasaki															11	14	13	13	14								48
18	(Czech Republic) Jakub Smrž	BMW	15	15	18	15	DNS	DNS	16	Ret	11	Ret	9	12	Ret	14	16	18	18	18	19	11	12	14	11	10	11	Ret	48
19	(Australia) Broc Parkes	Yamaha									Ret	Ret			6	13			14	14	10			9	9	DNS	14	10	45
20	(Japan) Ryuichi Kiyonari	Suzuki	11	12	Ret	Ret	DNS	DNS	Ret	19	Ret	20	7	11	19	22													42
20	(Japan) Ryuichi Kiyonari	BMW																	16	10	15	DNS	DNS	18	18	14	15	7	42
21	(Northern Ireland) Alastair Seeley	BMW	Ret	14	5	Ret	17	14	15	18	14	Ret	Ret	22	16	18	15	16	Ret	15	13	Ret	DNS	21	Ret	9	12	13	37
22	(Scotland) Stuart Easton	Yamaha	Ret	Ret	17	10	14	9	17	14	9	16	Ret	DNS															27
22	(Scotland) Stuart Easton	Ducati															21	20	15	16	16	Ret	14						27
23	(Republic of Ireland) Jack Kennedy	Kawasaki	Ret	Ret	7	9	DNS	DNS			Ret	17	Ret	Ret	Ret	Ret	19	Ret	Ret	Ret	DNS								16
24	(England) Howie Mainwaring-Smart	BMW	18	17	Ret	11	16	13	20	9	16	Ret	Ret	Ret															15
24	(England) Howie Mainwaring-Smart	Yamaha															22	Ret								DNS	DNS	DNS	15
25	(England) Martin Jessopp	BMW	17	18	21	Ret			21	Ret	17	22	10	15	17	19	DNS	DNS	Ret	DNS	DNS			Ret	21	Ret	Ret	19	7
26	(Australia) Josh Hook	Kawasaki							18	16	Ret	Ret	16	14	20	20	20	19	Ret	Ret	18	14	Ret	19	23	Ret	19	18	4
27	(United States) James Rispoli	Yamaha	Ret	DNS	19	16	Ret	DNS	23	17	13	19	Ret	21	18	17	17	17	17	Ret	17	Ret	DNS	Ret	22	DNS	17	DNS	3
28	(Italy) Vittorio Iannuzzo	Kawasaki	21	20	Ret	18	Ret	20	Ret	Ret	21	Ret	23	23	23	21	26	Ret	Ret	22	21	15	15	20	20	15	Ret	21	3
29	(England) Luke Stapleford	BMW											14	17															2
30	(Sweden) Filip Backlund	Kawasaki			20	17	18	17	19	Ret	15	18	15	18	Ret	DNS	18	Ret	19	19	20	Ret	Ret	23	25	DNS	DNS	DNS	2
	(England) Shaun Winfield	Yamaha	Ret	21	Ret	Ret	20	18	Ret	Ret	22	24	20	25	24	24	23	21	20	20	Ret	18	16	Ret	29	16	20	20	0
	(England) Aaron Zanotti	Yamaha	22	22	23	Ret	19	Ret	22	Ret	18	21	18	20	21	23	24	23	21	21	22	16	17	24	27	Ret	Ret	22	0
	(England) Josh Wainwright	BMW							Ret	22	20	23	19	24	22	Ret	25	22	Ret	24	23	17	18	26	28	Ret	21	23	0
	(Italy) Alessandro Polita	Ducati																						22	19	Ret	18	Ret	0
	(England) Jenny Tinmouth	Honda	20	23	22	19	Ret	Ret	24	20	Ret	Ret	Ret	DNS	DNS	DNS	27	24	22	23	24	Ret	19	27	26	DNS	DNS	DNS	0
	(England) Sam Hornsey	Kawasaki	19	19																									0
	(Czech Republic) Matěj Smrž	BMW			DNS	DNS	21	19																					0
	(England) Ian Hutchinson	BMW																						25	24				0
	(Northern Ireland) Michael Dunlop	BMW	Ret	Ret	Ret	DNS																							0
Pos	Rider	Bike	SIL (England)		OUL (England)		BRH (England)		KNO (Scotland)		SNE (England)		THR (England)		BRH (England)		CAD (England)		OUL (England)			DON (England)		ASS (Netherlands)		BRH (England)			Pts

Colour	Result
Gold	Winner
Silver	Second place
Bronze	Third place
Green	Points classification
Blue	Non-points classification
Blue	Non-classified finish (NC)
Purple	Retired, not classified (Ret)
Red	Did not qualify (DNQ)
Red	Did not pre-qualify (DNPQ)
Black	Disqualified (DSQ)
White	Did not start (DNS)
White	Withdrew (WD)
White	Race cancelled (C)
Blank	Did not practice (DNP)
Blank	Did not arrive (DNA)
Blank	Excluded (EX)

**Bold** – Pole position
Italics – Fastest lap

=== Manufacturers' championship ===
Pos	Manufacturer	SIL (England)		OUL (England)		BRH (England)		KNO (Scotland)		SNE (England)		THR (England)		BRH (England)		CAD (England)		OUL (England)			DON (England)		ASS (Netherlands)		BRH (England)			Pts
Pos	Manufacturer	R1	R2	R1	R2	R1	R2	R1	R2	R1	R2	R1	R2	R1	R2	R1	R2	R1	R2	R3	R1	R2	R1	R2	R1	R2	R3	Pts
1	(Japan) Kawasaki	4	1	1	3	1	3	1	2	4	4	3	4	2	2	2	1	1	1	1	2	4	1	1	1	1	1	538
2	(Italy) Ducati	2	2	8	6	9	1	10	1	3	1	1	3	1	1	1	3	9	9	5	1	1	2	2	3	6	3	451
3	(Japan) Honda	5	4	4	8	8	5	2	3	1	2	6	2	4	3	3	2	4	3	24	3	2	4	3	4	4	6	370
4	(Germany) BMW	1	3	2	1	4	2	6	7	6	3	2	1	5	5	8	10	6	8	4	6	3	6	6	2	11	5	361
5	(Japan) Suzuki	10	12	14	15	3	4	12	8	8	10	4	8	Ret	Ret	4	5	Ret	6	3	Ret	6	17	16	5	8	8	176
6	(Japan) Yamaha	9	21	11	10	12	9	4	14	9	16	18	20	6	13	14	15	12	14	10	9	16	9	9	7	2	2	153
Pos	Manufacturer	SIL (England)		OUL (England)		BRH (England)		KNO (Scotland)		SNE (England)		THR (England)		BRH (England)		CAD (England)		OUL (England)			DON (England)		ASS (Netherlands)		BRH (England)			Pts
