= 2015 British Supersport Championship =

The 2015 British Supersport Championship was the 28th British Supersport Championship season. It began at Donington Park on 5 April and ended at the Brands Hatch GP circuit on 18 October. It was won by Luke Stapleford, riding a Triumph Daytona 675. Defending champion Billy McConnell moved to the British Superbike Championship for 2015, and did not defend his title.

== Race calendar and results ==
2015 Calendar
Round		Circuit	Date	Pole position	Fastest lap	Winning rider	Winning team
1	R1	(England) Donington Park	5 April	(England) Luke Stapleford	(England) Jake Dixon	(England) Luke Stapleford	Profile Racing
1	R2	(England) Donington Park	6 April	(England) Jake Dixon	(England) Jake Dixon	(England) Jake Dixon	Smiths Racing
2	R1	(England) Brands Hatch Indy	18 April	(England) Kyle Ryde	(England) Kyle Ryde	(England) Kyle Ryde	PacedayZ Trackdays
2	R2	(England) Brands Hatch Indy	19 April	(England) Kyle Ryde	(England) Kyle Ryde	(England) Luke Stapleford	Profile Racing
3	R1	(England) Oulton Park	3 May	(England) Luke Stapleford	(England) Luke Stapleford	(England) Luke Stapleford	Profile Racing
3	R2	(England) Oulton Park	4 May	(England) Luke Stapleford	(Northern Ireland) Andy Reid	(England) Jake Dixon	Smiths Racing
4	R1	(England) Snetterton 300	20 June	(England) Kyle Ryde	(England) Luke Stapleford	(England) Luke Stapleford	Profile Racing
4	R2	(England) Snetterton 300	21 June	(England) Luke Stapleford	(England) Luke Stapleford	(Northern Ireland) Glenn Irwin	Gearlink Kawasaki
5	R1	(Scotland) Knockhill	4 July	(England) Luke Stapleford	(England) Jake Dixon	(Northern Ireland) Glenn Irwin	Gearlink Kawasaki
5	R2	(Scotland) Knockhill	5 July	(England) Jake Dixon	(England) Jake Dixon	(England) Kyle Ryde	PacedayZ Trackdays
6	R1	(England) Brands Hatch GP	18 July	(England) Luke Stapleford	(England) Luke Stapleford	(England) Luke Stapleford	Profile Racing
6	R2	(England) Brands Hatch GP	19 July	(England) Luke Stapleford	(England) Luke Stapleford	(England) Luke Stapleford	Profile Racing
7	R1	(England) Thruxton	1 August	(England) Luke Stapleford	(United States) James Rispoli	(England) Luke Stapleford	Profile Racing
7	R2	(England) Thruxton	2 August	(United States) James Rispoli	(England) Luke Stapleford	(England) Luke Stapleford	Profile Racing
8	R1	(England) Cadwell Park	22 August	(England) Luke Stapleford	(England) Jake Dixon	(England) Luke Stapleford	Profile Racing
8	R2	(England) Cadwell Park	23 August	(England) Jake Dixon	(England) Luke Stapleford	(England) Jake Dixon	Smiths Racing
9	R1	(England) Oulton Park	5 September	(Northern Ireland) Andy Reid	(Northern Ireland) Andy Reid	(Northern Ireland) Andy Reid	Team Traction Control
9	R2	(England) Oulton Park	6 September	(Northern Ireland) Andy Reid	(England) Luke Stapleford	(England) Jake Dixon	Smiths Racing
10	R1	(Netherlands) TT Circuit Assen	19 September	(England) Luke Stapleford	(England) Luke Stapleford	(England) Luke Stapleford	Profile Racing
10	R2	(Netherlands) TT Circuit Assen	20 September	(England) Luke Stapleford	(England) Luke Stapleford	(England) Luke Stapleford	Profile Racing
11	R1	(England) Silverstone Arena GP	3 October	(England) Luke Stapleford	(England) Luke Stapleford	(England) Luke Stapleford	Profile Racing
11	R2	(England) Silverstone Arena GP	4 October	(England) Luke Stapleford	(United States) James Rispoli	(Northern Ireland) Glenn Irwin	Gearlink Kawasaki
12	R1	(England) Brands Hatch GP	17 October	(England) Luke Stapleford	(England) Luke Stapleford	(England) Luke Stapleford	Profile Racing
12	R2	(England) Brands Hatch GP	18 October	(England) Luke Stapleford	(England) Luke Stapleford	(England) Luke Stapleford	Profile Racing

== Championship standings ==
=== Riders' championship ===
Pos	Rider	Bike	DON (England)		BRH (England)		OUL (England)		SNE (England)		KNO (Scotland)		BRH (England)		THR (England)		CAD (England)		OUL (England)		ASS (Netherlands)		SIL (England)		BRH (England)		Pts
Pos	Rider	Bike	R1	R2	R1	R2	R1	R2	R1	R2	R1	R2	R1	R2	R1	R2	R1	R2	R1	R2	R1	R2	R1	R2	R1	R2	Pts
1	(England) Luke Stapleford	Triumph	**1**	2	3	1	**1**	**Ret**	1	**Ret**	**2**	4	**1**	**1**	**1**	1	**1**	2	3	3	**1**	**1**	**1**	**Ret**	**1**	**1**	471
2	(England) Kyle Ryde	Yamaha	4	3	**1**	**2**	3	2	**2**	Ret	3	1	2	2	2	6	2	3	Ret	DNS	6	5	5	5	5	4	344
3	(England) Jake Dixon	Triumph	2	**1**	4	3	Ret	1	Ret	5	Ret	**2**	Ret	6	10	3	3	**1**	2	1	3	2	4	Ret	2	2	337
4	(Northern Ireland) Glenn Irwin	Kawasaki	3	4	2	4	2	4	5	1	1	3	Ret	8	6	4	5	7	Ret	4	5	3	3	1	Ret	3	320
5	(United States) James Rispoli	Yamaha	Ret	7	Ret	5	Ret	Ret	4	2	5	6	4	4	3	**Ret**	4	4	5	2	2	Ret	2	2	4	6	256
6	(England) Ben Wilson	Kawasaki	6	6	6	6	Ret	6	Ret	Ret	Ret	Ret	7	9	8	7	7	5	6	5	7	6	7	4	7	5	185
7	(England) Sam Hornsey	Triumph	11	Ret	5	Ret	Ret	7	Ret	Ret	4	5	5	5	4	8	Ret	8	4	Ret	4	4	6	3	3	Ret	181
8	(England) Luke Hedger	Kawasaki					6	Ret	6	3	6	8	6	7	7	5	8	6	8	6	Ret	9	9	6	9	8	168
9	(Northern Ireland) Andy Reid	Yamaha	5	5	Ret	DNS	4	3	3	Ret	DNS	DNS	3	3	5	2	6	Ret	**1**	**Ret**							165
10	(England) Joe Collier	Triumph	7	9	10	10	5	5	9	6	9	7	9	10	14	11	12	Ret	10	9	18	14	10	11	8	10	147
11	(England) Danny Webb	Yamaha	Ret	10	7	7	8	9	7	4	7	12	Ret	Ret	9	9	Ret	12	9	Ret	8	7	Ret	7	13	9	135
12	(Northern Ireland) Marshall Neill	Yamaha	9	11	12	Ret	14	11	8	Ret	11	9	Ret	13	11	14	13	11	11	11	11	10	11	10	12	Ret	97
13	(England) Dean Hipwell	Triumph	8	Ret	8	Ret	7	8	10	Ret	13	13	8	11	16	10	18	14	Ret	7	12	11	14	15	24	Ret	87
14	(Scotland) Matthew Paulo	Yamaha	Ret	Ret	24	24	15	14	12	10	8	10	16	14	20	15	9	9	12	10	Ret	13	13	14	14	Ret	64
15	(England) Jamie Perrin	Yamaha	10	Ret	11	13	10	Ret	14	8	DNS	DNS	11	Ret	13	12	Ret	Ret	Ret	DNS	20	DNS	12	9	11	10	64
16	(South Africa) Bjorn Estment	Triumph	14	13	9	8	Ret	13	Ret	DNS	12	Ret	10	Ret	12	13	10	Ret	13	13	Ret	Ret	16	Ret	11	12	61
17	(England) Joe Francis	Yamaha																			9	8	8	8	6	7	50
18	(England) Harry Hartley	Yamaha	Ret	8	Ret	9	9	Ret									11	10	7	Ret	Ret	12					46
19	(England) Sam Coventry	Kawasaki	13	18	13	12	11	Ret	17	12	14	Ret	13	12	19	Ret	14	Ret	14	12	17	17	Ret	13	15	13	43
20	(Australia) Levi Day	Kawasaki	12	12	15	16	13	12	11	7	10	11	15	Ret													42
21	(England) Freddy Pett	Triumph	DNS	15	18	17	18	18	13	13			12	15	17	Ret	15	17	18	18	14	20	15	12	19	15	21
22	(England) Luke Jones	MV Agusta	15	Ret	14	11	Ret	Ret	Ret	9			DNS	DNS											18	Ret	15
23	(Northern Ireland) Keith Farmer	MV Agusta													15	18	Ret	13	15	8	Ret	25					13
24	(England) Josh Day	Triumph	DNS	14	16	15	12	10																			13
25	(Scotland) Niall Campbell	Yamaha	18	20	Ret	14	20	Ret	18	14	DNS	14	14	17	18	Ret	20	18	19	14	23	19	19	18	20	20	10
26	(England) Ben Stafford	Kawasaki																			10	Ret	Ret	19			6
27	(England) Josh Daley	Kawasaki	22	23	17	18	16	21	16	11	Ret	Ret	17	19	21	17	16	15	16	20			Ret	Ret	16	18	6
28	(Northern Ireland) David Allingham	MV Agusta							Ret	17	16	15	19	16	23	16	Ret	19	17	Ret	13	16	17	16	Ret	16	4
29	(England) Philip Wakefield	Yamaha	19	19	19	25	19	15	15	15	17	Ret	23	21	24	19	17	16	20	16	25	Ret					3
30	(England) Sam Thompson	Triumph											18	Ret	25	20	Ret	21	22	17	26	18	Ret	DNS	23	14	2
31	(England) Paul Curran	Triumph	17	16	22	22	17	16	DNS	Ret	15	16	22	Ret	DNS	DNS											1
32	(England) Tommy Philp	Yamaha											20	20	22	Ret	19	Ret	21	15	16	27	18	17	22	19	1
33	(Netherlands) Cliff Kloots	Yamaha																			15	24					1
34	(England) Matt Truelove	Yamaha																			Ret	15					1
	(England) Guy Martin	Triumph	16	17																							0
	(England) Sam Cox	Triumph	21	DNS	20	21	22	19	20	16	19	DNS			29	22					31	29	26	24	31	24	0
	(England) Ryan Dixon	Yamaha	24	22	25	23	21	17	19	Ret	18	17	21	18	28	21	21	20	24	19					26	22	0
	(England) Malachi Mitchell-Thomas	Kawasaki																					Ret	Ret	17	17	0
	(England) James Henry	Kawasaki	Ret	21	23	26	23	20	21	18			24	Ret	26	23	22	Ret	25	21			22	22	25	Ret	0
	(England) Jake Bayford	Yamaha									20	18	25	22	27	Ret	26	DNS					29	29	28	29	0
	(Italy) Vittorio Iannuzzo	MV Agusta	23	Ret	21	19	DNS	DNS																			0
	(England) Olly Savage	Kawasaki							22	19																	0
	(Netherlands) Eric Ott	Yamaha																			19	26					0
	(England) Ben Field	MV Agusta	20	Ret	Ret	20																					0
	(England) Arnie Shelton	Kawasaki																					23	20	27	23	0
	(Australia) Anthony West	MV Agusta																					20	Ret			0
	(England) Luke Shelley	Triumph																					21	21			0
	(England) Dan Stamper	Kawasaki																			22	21					0
	(Netherlands) Christian Nobel	Suzuki																			21	22					0
	(Northern Ireland) Nikki Coates	Kawasaki																							21	Ret	0
	(England) Ricky Tarren	Yamaha											28	24	31	24	25	22	29	23			Ret	27	33	27	0
	(England) Ed Pead	Yamaha	25	24			24	22					27	25	30	26			27	Ret			28	26			0
	(England) Joe Thompson	Kawasaki																	28	22			24	25	30	31	0
	(England) Jamie Harris	Yamaha																					25	23	30	25	0
	(England) Chris Burrage	Yamaha											26	23													0
	(England) Harry Truelove	Yamaha																			23	29					0
	(England) Richard Steadman	Triumph															23	Ret			32	30	27	28	29	28	0
	(Republic of Ireland) James Flitcroft	Honda																			24	28	Ret	DNS			0
	(England) Arnie Shelton	Kawasaki															24	Ret									0
	(England) Andrew Lund	Yamaha	27	25											32	25					DNS	DNS	31	30			0
	(England) Matt Coles	Triumph	26	26			DNS	DNS											30	Ret	Ret	33	30	31	34	32	0
	(Northern Ireland) Jamie Patterson	Suzuki																							Ret	26	0
	(Northern Ireland) Conor Parkhill	Kawasaki																			27	Ret	Ret	Ret	35	DNS	0
	(Netherlands) Ivan Doornbos	Kawasaki																			28	32					0
	(Netherlands) Kevin van Leuven	Kawasaki																			Ret	DNS					0
	(England) Chris Hellewell	Yamaha	DNS	Ret																							0
	(Netherlands) Bobby Bos	Honda																			DNS	DNS					0
Pos	Rider	Bike	BRH (England)		DON (England)		OUL (England)		SNE (England)		KNO (Scotland)		BRH (England)		THR (England)		CAD (England)		OUL (England)		ASS (Netherlands)		SIL (England)		BRH (England)		Pts

Colour	Result
Gold	Winner
Silver	Second place
Bronze	Third place
Green	Points classification
Blue	Non-points classification
Blue	Non-classified finish (NC)
Purple	Retired, not classified (Ret)
Red	Did not qualify (DNQ)
Red	Did not pre-qualify (DNPQ)
Black	Disqualified (DSQ)
White	Did not start (DNS)
White	Withdrew (WD)
White	Race cancelled (C)
Blank	Did not practice (DNP)
Blank	Did not arrive (DNA)
Blank	Excluded (EX)

**Bold** – Pole
Italics – Fastest Lap
