= Leon Haslam =

British motorcycle racer (born 1983)

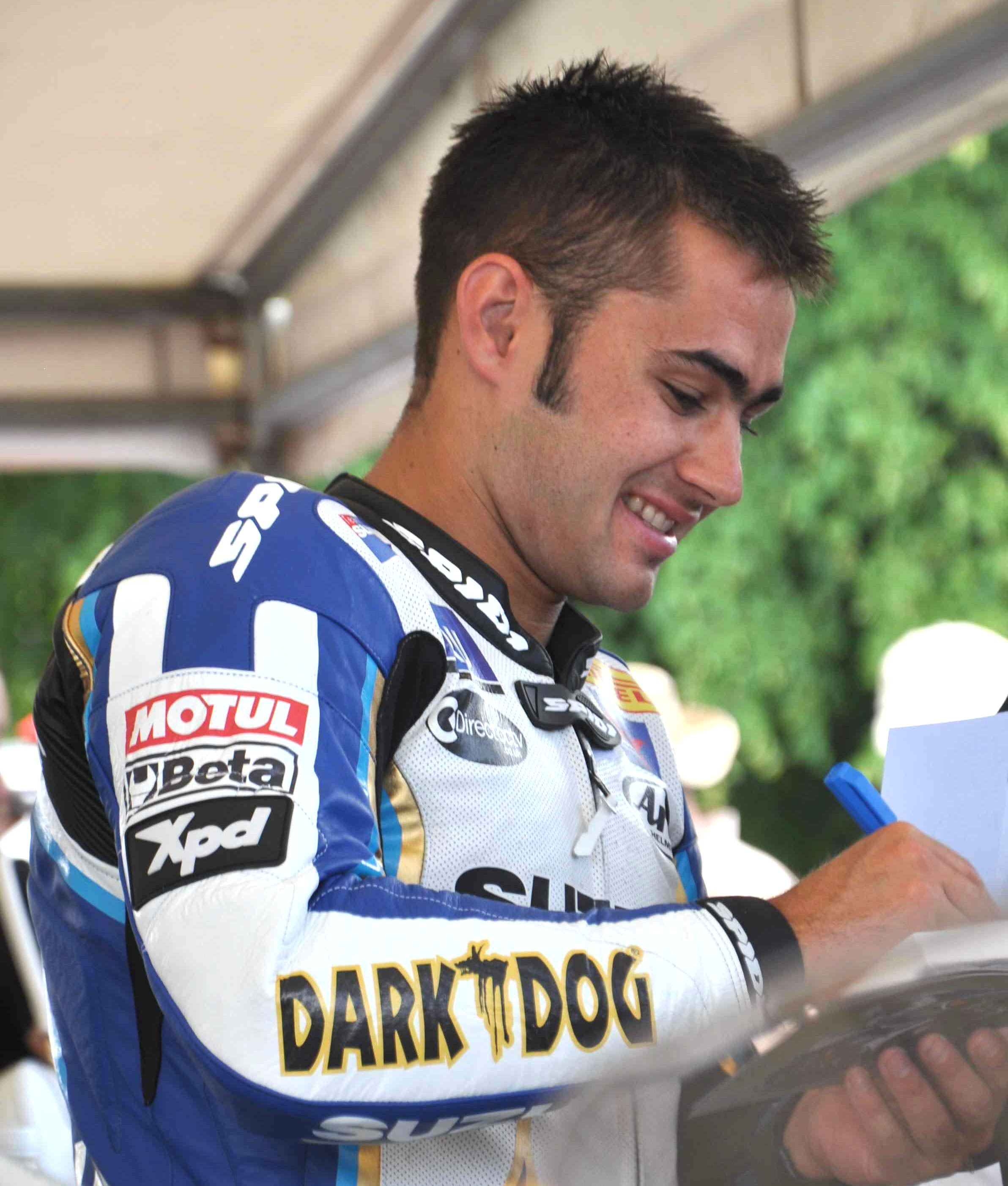
- Haslam signing an autograph at Goodwood Festival of Speed in 2010 wearing Suzuki colours
- Nationality: English
- Born: 31 May 1983 (age 43); London Borough of Ealing, England
- Current team: Moto Rapido Racing
- Bike number: 91
- Website: leonhaslam.com
Motorcycle racing career statistics
Superbike World Championship
Active years	2003–2004, 2008–2023
Manufacturers	Ducati, Honda, Suzuki, BMW, Aprilia, Kawasaki
Championships	0
2023 championship position	23rd (2 pts)
Starts / Wins / Podiums / Poles / F. laps / Points; 325 / 5 / 45 / 3 / 6 / 2472
British Superbike Championship
Active years	2003–2008, 2016–2018, 2022–
Manufacturers	Ducati, Honda, Kawasaki
Championships	1 (2018)
2026 championship position	5th (376 points)
Starts / Wins / Podiums / Poles / F. laps / Points; 351 / 47 / 129 / 38 / 37 / 5105

Leon Lloyd Haslam (born 31 May 1983), is a British motorcycle racer based in Derbyshire, England, who currently competes in the British Superbike Championship for Moto Rapido Racing, on a Ducati Panigale V4R. He is the 2018 champion, winning the title on the Kawasaki Ninja ZX-10R. Haslam is nicknamed 'Pocket Rocket' and is the son of former road-racer 'Rocket Ron' Haslam.

Haslam began racing at an early age, and by the time he was in his late teens, he had raced in most of the significant British and international championships. For the 2004 season, he was on a Ducati in the Superbike World Championship with teammate Noriyuki Haga, and scored a third place in the German GP. Between 2005 and 2008, he was a regular front-runner in the British Superbike Championship.

For 2009, Haslam returned to the Superbike World Championship, and competed regularly until 2015, riding for Suzuki, BMW, Honda and Aprilia. Between the 2016 and 2018 seasons, he raced in the British Superbike Championship aboard a Kawasaki ZX-10R. He looked set to claim the 2017 championship, leading in the standings during the final race, when he suffered brake failure which saw him crash out of contention, and suffered a broken ankle. It handed the title to Shane Byrne, who won a record sixth BSB title. Haslam came back from injury and won the 2018 British championship at the final event held at Brands Hatch in late October next season.

Haslam signed to join the factory Kawasaki team in the Superbike World Championship for 2019, alongside team-mate Jonathan Rea. After the season he was contracted to ride the then-new Honda CBR1000RR-R in World Superbike for 2020 and 2021, with the team being run for the first time under full HRC control.

In February 2022, he confirmed he would be racing again in British Superbikes for Lee Hardy Racing on a Kawasaki ZX-10R, with the help of VisionTrack (previously a backer of Paul Bird Motorsport), the sponsor of the team. Haslam competed in a wild card ride at Assen in World Superbikes in April of 2022, substituting at short notice for Pedercini Racing.

== Career ==
=== Early career ===
Haslam was first exposed to motorcycle racing as a baby, often travelling with his parents to his dad, Ron Haslam's, races. He was 1995 and 1996's National Youth Motocross champion, and 1998's MCN Young Rider of the Year after finishing seventh in the British 125cc Championship. He did an assortment of 125cc races in 1999, but quickly advanced into international racing after that. Halsam spent the 2000 season with the underprepared Italjet team on their return to the 125cc world championship, then racing a privateer Honda NSR500V in 2001 (scoring five points finishes, as the youngest rider ever to compete in the series), and a 250cc Honda in 2002 (again scoring points five times). At this stage, having never ridden on competitive machinery, he had valuable experience but little in the way of results, leading him to return home. For 2003, Renegade Ducati signed him to ride in the British Supersport championship, but he was promoted to the full blown Superbike after the departure of Sean Emmett, also riding in six World Superbikes races with a best finish of sixth at Assen and Magny Cours.

=== Superbike World Championship ===
For 2004, Haslam did the full WSBK season for Renegade alongside Noriyuki Haga. He was eighth overall with a best of third, finishing as the rookie of the year. Haslam also had an impressive victory in a British Superbike race at Brands Hatch on one of the team's three ventures into the series. In torrential rain, this was the only Ducati win in the series all year, even though this was the title-winning bike in both 2003 (Shane "Shakey" Byrne) and 2005 (Gregorio Lavilla).

=== British Superbike Championship ===
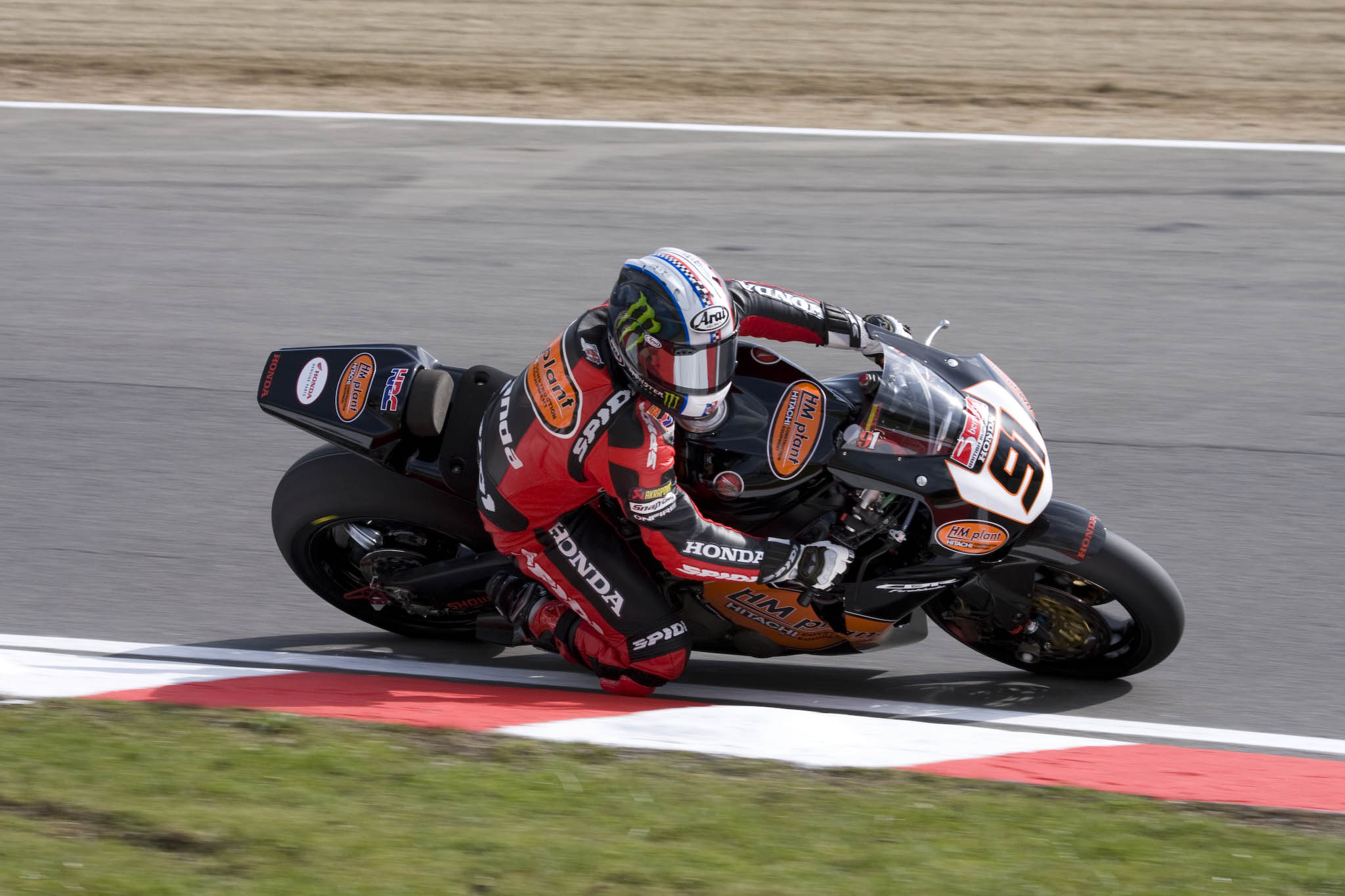
Leon Haslam races at Brands Hatch for Round One, 2008

With Renegade switching to Honda machinery and cutting to one rider Haslam moved to BSB with the reformed GSE Racing Squad, now known as Airwaves Ducati. Haslam finished fourth overall behind only teammate Lavilla and the two HM Plant Hondas of Ryuichi Kiyonari and Michael Rutter.

2006 saw Haslam once again on the Airwaves sponsored GSE Ducati 999, partnering Lavilla. In the first 12 races of the 2006 season, he finished second no less than eight times, without winning a race but taking three poles and lying second overall. The wins came later; he was particularly proud of a win in the wet at Croft.

Haslam managed to push for the title all the way to the last race of the season at a rain soaked Brands Hatch where Leon, Lavilla and Kiyonari all had a chance to win. He was running second to Kiyo in the first race when it was stopped after Byrne crashed heavily, and despite storming to victory in the second race, he ended the season in second place and Lavilla (who crashed in race one) was third. Haslam did however drive off in the £50,000 Audi convertible which was his prize for scoring the most points in the Audi pole position competition.

While Lavilla won the first four races and lead the championship after eight, Haslam struggled to match these results. However, two-second places at Oulton Park in round four moved him up to fourth overall. He ultimately finished third, behind Kiyonari and Jonathan Rea's Hondas but ahead of a fading Lavilla.

Haslam was released by Airwaves Ducati for 2008, when they initially withdrew from the series over questions about the legality of the Ducati 1098 under the new BSB tuning rules. He joined Airwaves' rivals HM Plant Honda, but the Ducati proved to be the faster bike, with Shakey Byrne dominating the championship. Haslam struggled early in the season and was generally outpaced by younger teammate Cal Crutchlow, and was excluded from race 2 at Oulton Park after a racing incident with Tom Sykes. Despite several podium finishes his first win did not come until round 8 at Knockhill, when race leader Byrne crashed heavily. He then took a double win at Cadwell Park, despite not starting on the front row

Haslam also made two wild card appearance in the World Superbike Championship at Donington Park and Portimão. A competitive showing at Donington ended with disappointing results. In race one, he ran with the leaders after a red flag, but eased off after seeing a white flag with a red cross, which means the surface is slippery in WSBK, while in British Superbike, that indicates a safety vehicle is on course (typically a full-course caution period to neutralise the race with the deployment of the safety car). The time he lost here proved costly, as he was taken out a lap later. In race two he crashed out of fourth place with just three laps to go. At Portimão, he finished third in race two, with a German flag above him on the podium, implying that the officials expected Max Neukirchner to overhaul him.

=== Return to Superbike ===
WSBK remained Haslam's target for 2009, and he joined the Stiggy Honda team for their first World Superbike campaign, starting the year strongly with a third-place finish at the first round at Phillip Island in race two. The Dutch Grand Prix at Assen was also a very successful weekend as Haslam finished on the podium in both races with a third place in race one and a second place in race two. He finished the season sixth overall, comfortably the top privateer.

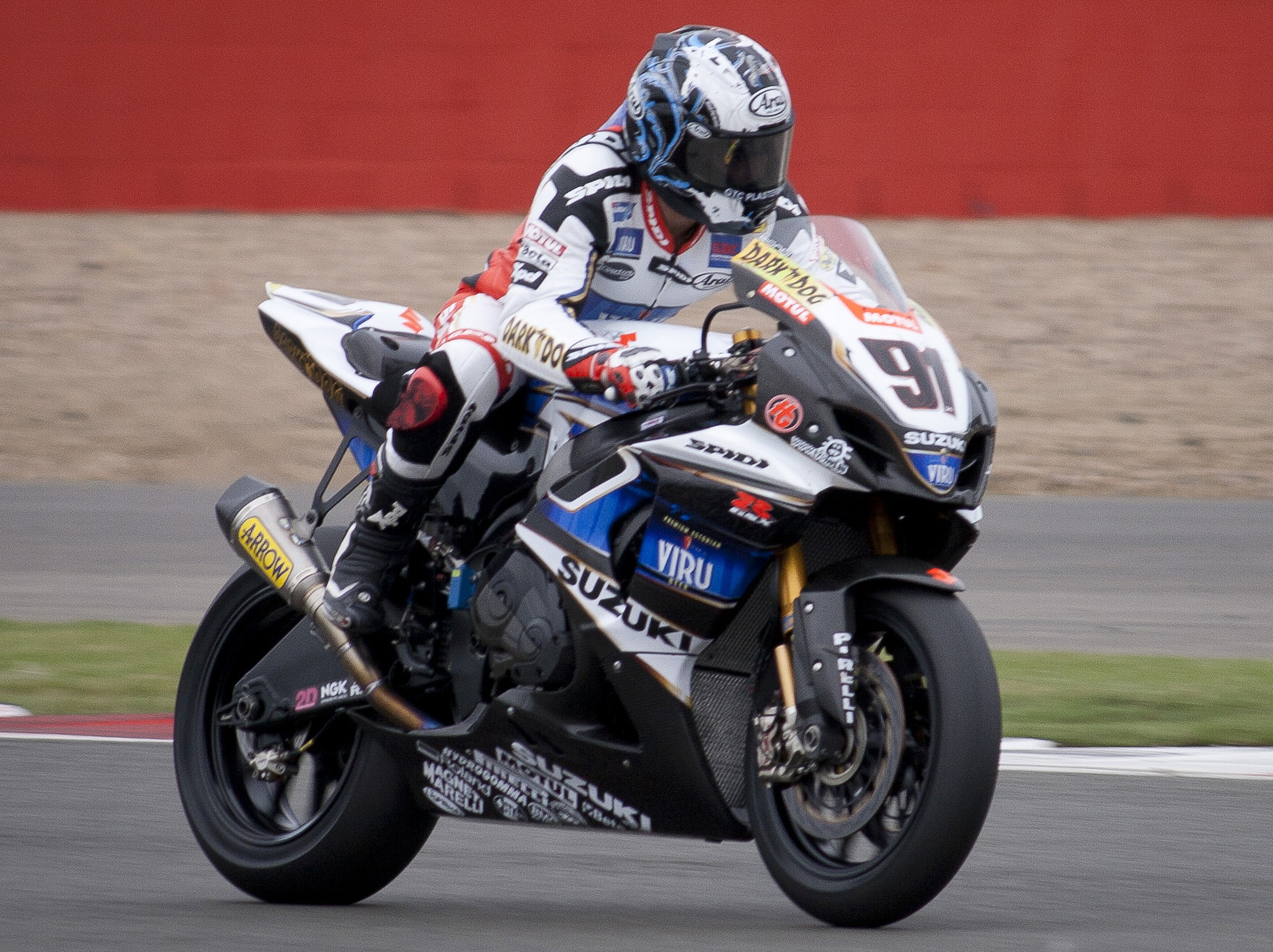
Haslam finished the 2010 season as runner-up to Max Biaggi

Haslam's results for Stiggy led to Alstare Suzuki signing him to partner Sylvain Guintoli for the 2010 season. He took his first WSBK pole in the 2010 season opener at Phillip Island. He then went on to win his first World Superbike race in race one, narrowly beating Michel Fabrizio by 0.004 seconds at the line in the closest finish ever recorded in a World Superbike race. Haslam was also in control of race two until three turns from the end he was overtaken by the eventual winner Carlos Checa. He took two-second places at round 2 in Portugal. These strong results continued in the early part of the season, before a run of four successive wins for Max Biaggi's Aprilia. This led Haslam to publicly ask Suzuki Japan for more resources, to prevent their title challenge from faltering. Haslam beat Biaggi in both Silverstone races, to trim Biaggi's championship lead to 60 points. The championship went down to the penultimate round at Imola

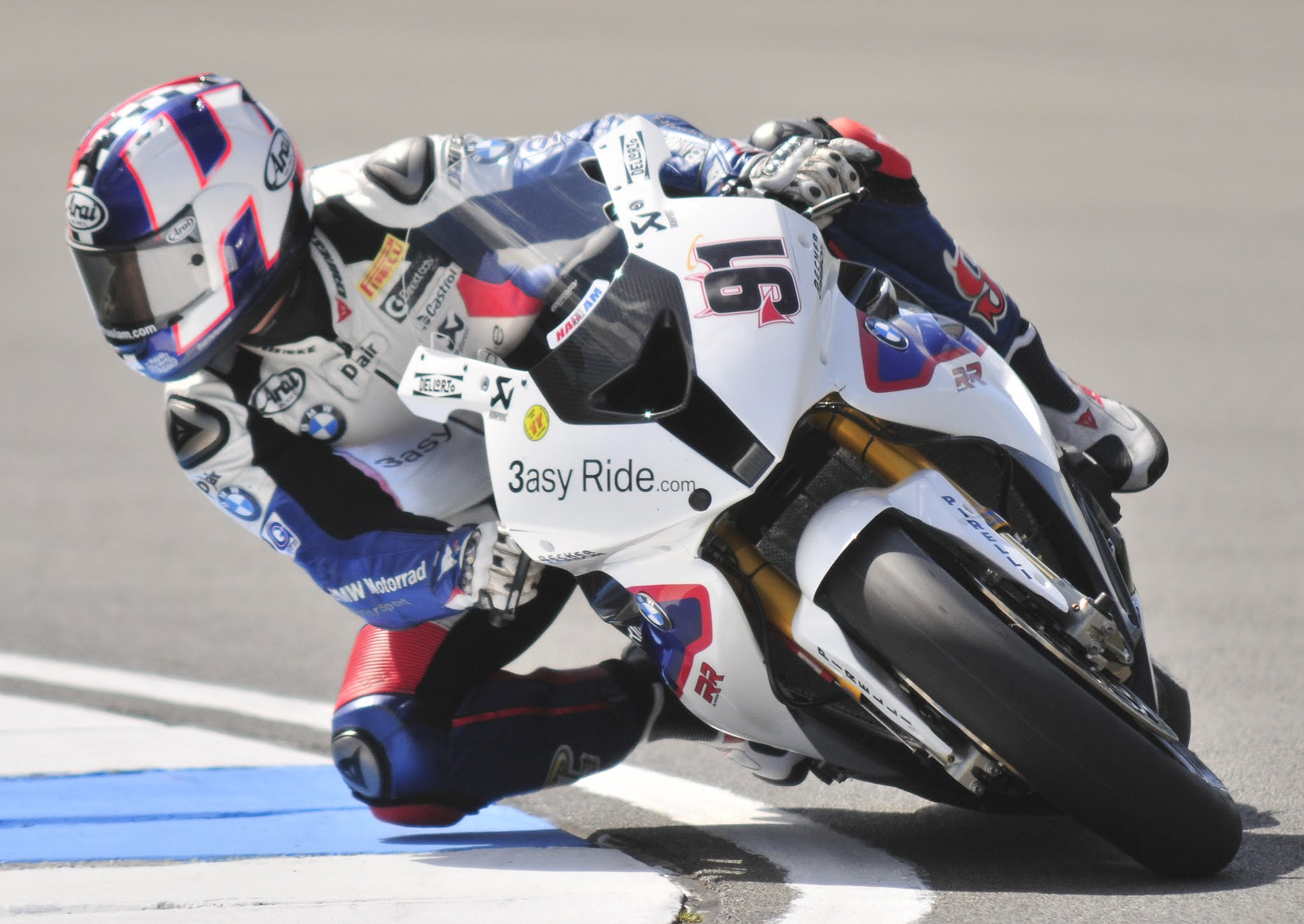
Haslam on the BMW S1000RR at the Donington round of the 2012 Superbike World Championship season

With Haslam needing to win, in race one both Haslam and Biaggi made mistakes, Biaggi ran straight on at turns 3 and 4 the Villeneuve esses cutting across the track right in front of the competitors and was lucky not to be hit or fall off, he recovered to finish 11th while Haslam was second going into the final lap, coming into rivazza one Haslam tried to go underneath race leader Carlos Checa, Haslam however could not stop the bike and ended up in the gravel and could only manage a fifth place, in race 2 Biaggi made a much better start and was right at the front from the start, with Haslam. Haslam made a mistake on lap 7 which dropped him back to fifth place, trying to make his way back up the field going through the Villeneuve esses his engine blew up, this was the Suzuki's first mechanical failure of the year. This handed the title to Max Biaggi who came home 5th, with wild celebrations on the slow down lap.

On 27 September, Haslam was released from his two-year contract with Alstare Suzuki by mutual consent, team manager Francis Batta citing the lack of response to the call for help from the Suzuki factory.

On 28 September 2010, Haslam signed a two-year contract with the BMW team to ride in the 2011 Superbike World Championship season, and for the 2013 season he joined Ten Kate Honda Fireblade WSB operating as Team Pata Honda, with Ulsterman Jonny Rea as teammate.

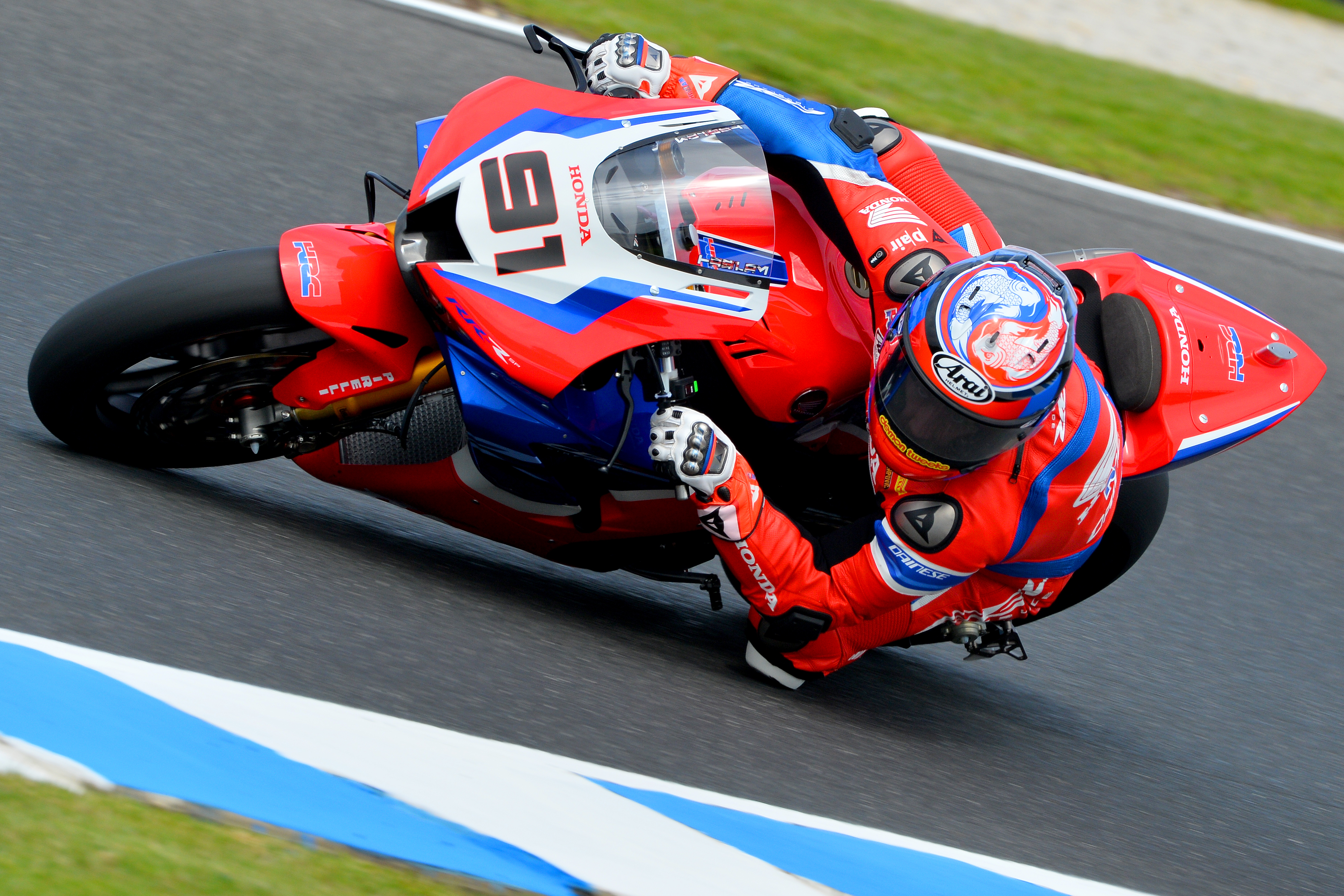
Haslam aboard the Honda CBR1000RR-R at Phillip Island in 2020

In July 2013, Haslam won the prestigious Coke Zero Suzuka 8 Hours endurance race in Japan, partnered-up for the race with Team Pata World Supersport rider Michael van der Mark – debuting at Suzuka – and 2010 winner Takumi Takahashi in the MuSashi HARC Pro Honda team. The trio repeated victory for the 2014 Coke Zero Suzuka 8 Hours.

After a disappointing 2014 season on the Ten Kate Pata Honda with injuries and average results, Haslam signed to race Aprilia for Red Devils Roma Team in 2015, together with Spanish teammate Jordi Torres.

== Personal life ==
Haslam has two sisters, Emma and Zoe. In 2010, he married his long term partner, former glamour model turned TV presenter Olivia Stringer in Sweden, who gave birth to their daughter Ava May in December 2011 and Max Peter on 11 August 2013.

Haslam owns the snooker cue that Peter Ebdon used to win the 2002 World Snooker Championship, and has it framed on his wall. He also enjoys playing poker, pool and golf, and supports Manchester United football club. His training partners included his wife, and the Formula Renault driver Riki Christodoulou. At Mallory Park he also made his debut in the British Rallycross Championship in a Suzuki Swift, for which he then stated he had plans to run in the series part-time in 2010.

== Career statistics ==
=== Career summary ===
Season	Series	Motorcycle	Team	Race	Win	Podium	Pole	FLap	Pts	Plcd
1998	125cc	Honda RS125R	Honda Britain	1	0	0	0	0	0	NC
1999	125cc	Honda RS125R	Honda Britain	1	0	0	0	0	0	NC
2000	125cc	Italjet F125	Italjet Moto	15	0	0	0	0	6	27th
2001	500cc	Honda NSR500/Honda NSR500V	Shell Advance Honda	15	0	0	0	0	13	19th
2002	250cc	Honda NSR250	Cibertel Honda BQR	16	0	0	0	0	19	18th
2003	Superbike	Ducati 998 RS	Renegade Ducati	6	0	0	0	0	35	21st
2003	British Superbike	Ducati 998 RS	Renegade Ducati	12	0	0	0	0	98	13th
2003	British Supersport	Ducati 748	Renegade Ducati	6	0	1	0	0	60	11th
2004	Superbike	Ducati 999 RS	Renegade Ducati	22	0	1	0	0	169	8th
2004	British Superbike	Ducati 999 RS	Renegade Ducati	4	1	1	0	0	43	19th
2005	British Superbike	Ducati 999 F04	Airwaves Ducati	26	3	11	3	1	350	4th
2006	British Superbike	Ducati 999 F06	Airwaves Ducati	24	3	20	5	6	458	2nd
2007	British Superbike	Ducati 999 F06	Airwaves Ducati	26	4	11	1	2	387	3rd
2008	Superbike	Honda CBR1000RR	HM Plant Honda	4	0	1	0	0	33	22nd
2008	British Superbike	Honda CBR1000RR	HM Plant Honda	24	5	11	1	4	357	2nd
2009	Superbike	Honda CBR1000RR	Stiggy Racing Team	28	0	4	0	1	241	6th
2010	Superbike	Suzuki GSX-R1000	Team Suzuki Alstare	26	3	14	1	2	376	2nd
2011	Superbike	BMW S1000RR	BMW Motorrad Motorsport	26	0	3	0	0	224	5th
2012	Superbike	BMW S1000RR	BMW Motorrad Motorsport	27	0	5	0	1	200	8th
2013	Superbike	Honda CBR1000RR	Pata Honda World Superbike	20	0	0	0	0	91	13th
2014	Superbike	Honda CBR1000RR	Pata Honda World Superbike	24	0	1	0	0	187	7th
2015	Superbike	Aprilia RSV4 RF	Aprilia Racing Team - Red Devils	26	2	9	2	2	332	4th
2016	Superbike	Kawasaki ZX-10R	Pedercini Racing	2	0	0	0	0	16	20th
2016	British Superbike	Kawasaki ZX-10R	JG Speedfit Kawasaki	26	9	15	4	3	640	2nd
2017	Superbike	Kawasaki ZX-10RR	Kawasaki Puccetti Racing	2	0	1	0	0	20	23rd
2017	British Superbike	Kawasaki ZX-10RR	JG Speedfit Kawasaki	24	6	12	1	3	631	3rd
2018	Superbike	Kawasaki ZX-10RR	Kawasaki Puccetti Racing	4	0	0	0	0	14	20th
2018	British Superbike	Kawasaki ZX-10RR	JG Speedfit Kawasaki	26	15	21	1	10	699	1st
2019	Superbike	Kawasaki ZX-10RR	Kawasaki Racing Team WorldSBK	37	0	6	0	0	281	7th
2020	Superbike	Honda CBR1000RR-R	Team HRC	24	0	0	0	0	113	10th
2021	Superbike	Honda CBR1000RR-R	Team HRC	35	0	0	0	0	134	13th
2022	Superbike	Kawasaki Ninja ZX-10RR	TPR Team Pedercini Racing	9	0	0	0	0	44	24th

=== Grand Prix motorcycle racing ===
==== Races by year ====
(key) (Races in bold indicate pole position) (Races in italics indicate fastest lap)

Year	Class	Bike	1	2	3	4	5	6	7	8	9	10	11	12	13	14	15	16	Pos	Pts
1998	125cc	Honda	JPN	MAL	SPA	ITA	FRA	MAD	NED	GBR; 17	GER	CZE	IMO	CAT	AUS	ARG			NC	0
1999	125cc	Honda	MAL	JPN	SPA	FRA	ITA	CAT	NED	GBR; 19	GER	CZE	IMO	VAL	AUS	RSA	BRA	ARG	NC	0
2000	125cc	Italjet	RSA; 22	MAL; 19	JPN; Ret	SPA; 17	FRA; DNQ	ITA; 22	CAT; 10	NED; 18	GBR; 19	GER; Ret	CZE; 17	POR; Ret	VAL; 22	BRA; Ret	PAC; Ret	AUS; 17	27th	6
2001	500cc	Honda	JPN; 13	RSA; 17	SPA; 16	FRA; DNS	ITA	CAT; WD	NED; 13	GBR; 17	GER; Ret	CZE; Ret	POR; Ret	VAL; 16	PAC; 15	AUS; 19	MAL; 15	BRA; 11	19th	13
2002	250cc	Honda	JPN; Ret	RSA; 15	ESP; 19	FRA; Ret	ITA; 18	CAT; 18	NED; Ret	GBR; 17	GER; 13	CZE; 17	POR; 7	BRA; 10	PAC; Ret	MAL; 17	AUS; 18	VAL; 17	18th	19

=== Superbike World Championship ===
==== Races by year ====
(key) (Races in bold indicate pole position) (Races in italics indicate fastest lap)

Year	Bike	1		2		3		4		5		6		7		8		9		10		11		12		13		14		Pos	Pts
Year	Bike	R1	R2	R1	R2	R1	R2	R1	R2	R1	R2	R1	R2	R1	R2	R1	R2	R1	R2	R1	R2	R1	R2	R1	R2	R1	R2	R1	R2	Pos	Pts
2003	Ducati	SPA	SPA	AUS	AUS	JPN	JPN	ITA	ITA	GER	GER	GBR	GBR	SMR	SMR	USA	USA	GBR; Ret	GBR; 10	NED; 6	NED; 7	ITA	ITA	FRA; Ret	FRA; 6					21st	35
2004	Ducati	SPA; 5	SPA; 9	AUS; Ret	AUS; 10	SMR; 11	SMR; 5	ITA; 5	ITA; 4	GER; 7	GER; 3	GBR; 5	GBR; 4	USA; 9	USA; Ret	EUR; Ret	EUR; Ret	NED; 6	NED; 6	ITA; 10	ITA; 12	FRA; 7	FRA; 6							8th	169
2008	Honda	QAT	QAT	AUS	AUS	SPA	SPA	NED	NED	ITA	ITA	USA	USA	GER	GER	SMR	SMR	CZE	CZE	GBR	GBR	EUR; 8	EUR; Ret	ITA	ITA	FRA	FRA	POR; 7	POR; 3	22nd	33
2009	Honda	AUS; 6	AUS; 3	QAT; 11	QAT; 11	SPA; 5	SPA; 5	NED; 3	NED; 2	ITA; Ret	ITA; 7	RSA; Ret	RSA; 4	USA; 10	USA; Ret	SMR; 12	SMR; 8	GBR; 4	GBR; 2	CZE; 7	CZE; 12	GER; 6	GER; 5	ITA; 6	ITA; 8	FRA; 5	FRA; 5	POR; Ret	POR; Ret	6th	241
2010	Suzuki	**AUS**; 1	**AUS**; 2	POR; 2	POR; 2	SPA; 1	SPA; 4	NED; 11	NED; 2	ITA; 4	ITA; 2	RSA; 3	RSA; 1	USA; 2	USA; Ret	SMR; 8	SMR; 2	CZE; 8	CZE; 10	GBR; 3	GBR; 4	GER; 6	GER; 3	ITA; 5	ITA; Ret	FRA; 2	FRA; 10			**2nd**	**376**
2011	BMW	AUS; 3	AUS; 5	EUR; 4	EUR; 4	NED; 12	NED; 5	ITA; 3	ITA; Ret	USA; 8	USA; 13	SMR; Ret	SMR; 5	SPA; 9	SPA; 9	CZE; 8	CZE; 7	GBR; 4	GBR; 8	GER; 5	GER; 9	ITA; Ret	ITA; 5	FRA; 3	FRA; 4	POR; 9	POR; 15			5th	224
2012	BMW	AUS; 12	AUS; 5	ITA; 3	ITA; 3	NED; Ret	NED; 5	ITA; C	ITA; 2	EUR; 2	EUR; 15	USA; 10	USA; 8	SMR; 12	SMR; 3	SPA; 7	SPA; 6	CZE; 7	CZE; 7	GBR; 6	GBR; 17	RUS; 6	RUS; Ret	GER; 7	GER; Ret	POR; 19	POR; Ret	FRA; 5	FRA; Ret	8th	200
2013	Honda	AUS; 7	AUS; 10	SPA; 9	SPA; 9	NED; DNS	NED; DNS	ITA	ITA	GBR; DNS	GBR; DNS	POR; Ret	POR; DNS	ITA; 10	ITA; 9	RUS; Ret	RUS; C	GBR; 7	GBR; Ret	GER; 7	GER; 13	TUR; 9	TUR; 8	USA; Ret	USA; 11	FRA; 8	FRA; Ret	SPA; Ret	SPA; Ret	13th	91
2014	Honda	AUS; Ret	AUS; 6	SPA; 9	SPA; 8	NED; 8	NED; 5	ITA; 10	ITA; 8	GBR; 8	GBR; 7	MAL; 7	MAL; 11	SMR; 10	SMR; 12	POR; 11	POR; 5	USA; 7	USA; 7	SPA; 7	SPA; 8	FRA; 6	FRA; 3	QAT; 11	QAT; 10					7th	187
2015	Aprilia	AUS; 2	AUS; 1	THA; 2	THA; 2	**SPA**; 4	**SPA**; 3	NED; 4	NED; 4	ITA; 4	ITA; Ret	GBR; 4	GBR; 4	POR; 12	POR; 3	SMR; 5	SMR; 3	USA; 13	USA; 5	MAL; 7	MAL; 6	SPA; 5	SPA; 3	**FRA**; 16	**FRA**; 5	QAT; 6	QAT; 1			4th	332
2016	Kawasaki	AUS	AUS	THA	THA	SPA	SPA	NED	NED	ITA	ITA	MAL	MAL	GBR	GBR	ITA	ITA	USA	USA	GER	GER	FRA	FRA	SPA	SPA	QAT; 11	QAT; 5			20th	16
2017	Kawasaki	AUS	AUS	THA	THA	SPA	SPA	NED	NED	ITA	ITA	GBR; 2	GBR; Ret	ITA	ITA	USA	USA	GER	GER	POR	POR	FRA	FRA	SPA	SPA	QAT	QAT			23rd	20
2018	Kawasaki	AUS	AUS	THA	THA	SPA	SPA	NED	NED	ITA; 9	ITA; 16	GBR; 9	GBR; Ret	CZE	CZE	USA	USA	ITA	ITA	POR	POR	FRA	FRA	ARG	ARG	QAT	QAT			20th	14

Year	Bike	1			2			3			4			5			6			7			8			9			10			11			12			13			Pos	Pts
Year	Bike	R1	SR	R2	R1	SR	R2	R1	SR	R2	R1	SR	R2	R1	SR	R2	R1	SR	R2	R1	SR	R2	R1	SR	R2	R1	SR	R2	R1	SR	R2	R1	SR	R2	R1	SR	R2	R1	SR	R2	Pos	Pts
2019	Kawasaki	AUS; 15	AUS; 3	AUS; 3	THA; 5	THA; 5	THA; 5	SPA; 9	SPA; 7	SPA; 4	NED; 5	NED; C	NED; 8	ITA; 5	ITA; 6	ITA; C	SPA; 9	SPA; 6	SPA; 5	ITA; Ret	ITA; 3	ITA; 3	GBR; 3	GBR; 3	GBR; 5	USA; Ret	USA; 5	USA; 6	POR; 5	POR; 5	POR; 5	FRA; Ret	FRA; 9	FRA; 7	ARG; 6	ARG; 8	ARG; 10	QAT; 5	QAT; 4	QAT; 9	7th	281
2020	Honda	AUS; 5	AUS; 8	AUS; 12	SPA; 10	SPA; 9	SPA; 12	POR; 12	POR; 9	POR; 13	SPA; 10	SPA; 10	SPA; 7	SPA; 7	SPA; 8	SPA; 4	SPA; 10	SPA; Ret	SPA; 9	FRA; Ret	FRA; 11	FRA; 13	POR; 5	POR; 8	POR; 7																10th	113
2021	Honda	SPA; 8	SPA; 10	SPA; Ret	POR; 12	POR; 16	POR; 12	ITA; 14	ITA; 11	ITA; Ret	GBR; 6	GBR; 4	GBR; 9	NED; 8	NED; 12	NED; 10	CZE; 8	CZE; 13	CZE; 11	SPA; 13	SPA; 14	SPA; Ret	FRA; 10	FRA; 9	FRA; Ret	SPA; 7	SPA; 7	SPA; 11	SPA; 11	SPA; C	SPA; 12	POR; 5	POR; Ret	POR; 8	ARG; 10	ARG; 10	ARG; 11	INA; DNS	INA; C	INA; DNS	13th	134
2022	Kawasaki	SPA	SPA	SPA	NED; 16	NED; 17	NED; 13	POR	POR	POR	ITA	ITA	ITA	GBR; 15	GBR; 13	GBR; Ret	CZE	CZE	CZE	FRA	FRA	FRA	SPA	SPA	SPA	POR; Ret	POR; 19	POR; Ret	ARG	ARG	ARG	INA	INA	INA	AUS	AUS	AUS				26th	4
2023	BMW	AUS	AUS	AUS	INA	INA	INA	NED	NED	NED	SPA	SPA	SPA	EMI	EMI	EMI	GBR; 14	GBR; 15	GBR; Ret	ITA	ITA	ITA	CZE	CZE	CZE	FRA	FRA	FRA	SPA	SPA	SPA	POR	POR	POR	JER	JER	JER				23rd	2

=== British Superbike Championship ===
==== Races by year ====
(key) (Races in bold indicate pole position) (Races in italics indicate fastest lap)

Year	Bike	1		2		3		4		5		6		7		8		9		10		11		12		13		Pos	Pts	Ref
Year	Bike	R1	R2	R1	R2	R1	R2	R1	R2	R1	R2	R1	R2	R1	R2	R1	R2	R1	R2	R1	R2	R1	R2	R1	R2	R1	R2	Pos	Pts	Ref
2004	Ducati	SIL	SIL	BHI	BHI	SNE	SNE	OUL; Ret	OUL; 6	MON	MON	THR	THR	BHGP; 8	BHGP; 1	KNO	KNO	MAL	MAL	CRO	CRO	CAD	CAD	OUL	OUL	DON	DON	19th	43	
2005	Ducati	**BHI**; Ret	**BHI**; 4	THR; 4	THR; 7	MAL; 3	MAL; 5	OUL; 4	OUL; 1	MOP; Ret	MOP; 2	CRO; 6	CRO; Ret	KNO; 5	KNO; 5	**SNE**; 2	**SNE**; Ret	SIL; 2	SIL; 3	**CAD**; 6	**CAD**; 1	OUL; 4	OUL; 4	DON; 3	DON; 2	BHGP; 2	BHGP; 1	4th	350	
2006	Ducati	BHI; Ret	BHI; 2	DON; 3	DON; 2	**THR**; 2	**THR**; 2	**OUL**; 3	**OUL**; 7	MOP; C	MOP; C	MAL; 2	MAL; 2	**SNE**; 2	**SNE**; 2	KNO; 3	KNO; 3	OUL; 2	OUL; 3	CRO; 4	CRO; 1	**CAD**; 2	**CAD**; 1	SIL; Ret	SIL; 3	**BHGP**; 2	**BHGP**; 1	**2nd**	**458**	
2007	Ducati	BHGP; 6	BHGP; 4	THR; 6	THR; 6	SIL; 6	SIL; 5	OUL; 2	OUL; 2	SNE; 3	SNE; 5	MOP; 1	MOP; 4	KNO; 3	KNO; 2	OUL; 4	OUL; 4	MAL; 3	MAL; 2	CRO; 5	CRO; 6	**CAD**; 1	**CAD**; Ret	DON; 1	DON; 1	BHI; 4	BHI; 5	**3rd**	**387**	
2008	Honda	THR; 4	THR; Ret	OUL; 2	OUL; Ret	BHGP; 4	BHGP; 6	DON; 2	DON; 2	SNE; 5	SNE; 5	MAL; 2	MAL; 6	OUL; 4	OUL; 4	**KNO**; Ret	**KNO**; 1	CAD; 1	CAD; 1	CRO; 2	CRO; 1	SIL; 11	SIL; 1	BHI; 4	BHI; 2			**2nd**	**357**	

Year	Bike	1		2		3		4		5		6		7		8		9			10		11		12			Pos	Pts	Ref
Year	Bike	R1	R2	R1	R2	R1	R2	R1	R2	R1	R2	R1	R2	R1	R2	R1	R2	R1	R2	R3	R1	R2	R1	R2	R1	R2	R3	Pos	Pts	Ref
2016	Kawasaki	**SIL**; Ret	SIL; 5	**OUL**; 1	OUL; 3	BHI; 1	BHI; 3	KNO; 1	KNO; 6	SNE; 5	SNE; 4	THR; 13	THR; 5	BHGP; 2	BHGP; 2	**CAD**; 2	**CAD**; 1	OUL; 1	**OUL**; 1	OUL; 1	**DON**; 2	DON; Ret	ASS; 1	ASS; 1	BHGP; Ret	BHGP; 5	BHGP; 4	**2nd**	**640**	
2017	Kawasaki	**DON**; 1	DON; 1	BHI; 2	BHI; 3	OUL; 1	**OUL**; Ret	KNO; DNS	KNO; DNS	SNE; 4	SNE; 8	BHGP; 3	BHGP; 5	THR; 7	THR; 3	CAD; 1	CAD; Ret	SIL; Ret	SIL; Ret	SIL; Ret	OUL; 1	OUL; 2	ASS; 1	ASS; 3	BHGP; 4	BHGP; 10	BHGP; Ret	3rd	631	
2018	Kawasaki	**DON**; 9	DON; 2	BHI; 4	BHI; 1	OUL; 1	**OUL**; 1	SNE; 1	SNE; 1	KNO; 2	KNO; 1	BHGP; 3	BHGP; 3	THR; 1	THR; 4	CAD; 1	**CAD**; 1	SIL; 1	SIL; 1	**SIL**; 1	OUL; 3	OUL; 2	ASS; 1	ASS; 1	BHGP; 6	BHGP; 1	**BHGP**; 6	1st	699	

Year	Bike	1			2			3			4			5			6			7			8				9			10			11			Pos	Pts
Year	Bike	R1	R2	R3	R1	R2	R3	R1	R2	R3	R1	R2	R3	R1	R2	R3	R1	R2	R3	R1	R2	R3	R1	R2	R3	R4	R1	R2	R3	R1	R2	R3	R1	R2	R3	Pos	Pts
2022	Kawasaki	SIL; Ret	SIL; 15	SIL; 13	OUL; 13	OUL; 3	OUL; 5	DON; Ret	DON; 5	DON; Ret	KNO; 11	KNO; Ret	KNO; 11	BRH; 8	BRH; 5	BRH; 6	THR; 8	THR; 9	THR; 6	CAD; 8	CAD; 4	CAD; 4	SNE; 5	SNE; 17	SNE; 6		OUL; 3	OUL; 6	OUL; 14	DON; 9	DON; Ret	DON; 10	BRH; Ret	BRH; Ret	BRH; DNS	11th	205
2023	BMW	SIL; 6	SIL; 6	SIL; 6	OUL; 2	OUL; 3	OUL; 2	DON; 3	**DON**; 4	DON; 8	KNO; 6	KNO; 10	KNO; 6	SNE; Ret	SNE; 3	SNE; 3	BRH; Ret	BRH; Ret	BRH; 8	THR; 6	THR; 7	THR; 6	CAD; Ret	**CAD**; 4	**CAD**; 3		OUL; 3	OUL; 4	OUL; 4	DON; 2	**DON**; 2	DON; Ret	BRH; Ret	BRH; 6	BRH; 5	5th	369
2024	BMW	NAV; 11	NAV; 4		OUL; 10	OUL; 8	OUL; 5	DON; 3	DON; 2	DON; 6	KNO; 10	KNO; Ret	KNO; Ret	SNE; 8	SNE; 24	SNE; Ret	BRH; 7	BRH; 5	BRH; 10	THR; 6	THR; 9	THR; 10	CAD; 8	CAD; 8	CAD; 7		OUL; 6	OUL; 3	OUL; 13	DON; 11	DON; Ret	DON; 10	BRH; Ret	BRH; 11	BRH; Ret	9th	228
2025	Ducati	OUL; 3	OUL; 1	**OUL**; C	DON; 6	DON; 5	DON; 4	SNE; 4	SNE; 5	SNE; 3	KNO; 13	KNO; 8	KNO; 7	BRH; 24	BRH; 9	BRH; 7	THR; 9	THR; 8	THR; 6	CAD; 8	CAD; 4	CAD; 7	DON; 8	DON; 7	DON; 6	DON; 4	ASS; 2	ASS; 5	ASS; 2	OUL; 2	OUL; 2	OUL; 3	BRH; 7	BRH; Ret	BRH; DNS	3rd	362
2026	Ducati	OUL; 2	OUL; 2	OUL; 2	DON; 4	DON; 5	DON; 5	KNO; 8	KNO; 6	KNO; 8	SNE; 4	SNE; Ret	SNE; 5	BRH; 4	BRH; 6	BRH; 4	OUL; 3	OUL; Ret	OUL; 5	THR; 6	THR; 5	THR; 4	CAD; 3	CAD; 4	CAD; 5		**ASS**; 3	ASS; DNS	ASS; 6	DON; 6	DON; Ret	DON; Ret	BRH; 4	BRH; 4	BRH; 6	5th	376

=== Suzuka 8 Hours Results ===
Year	Team	Co-riders	Bike	Pos
2008	(Japan) Team SAKURAI Honda 10	(Japan) Chojun Kameya	Honda CBR1000RR	9th
2013	(Japan) MuSASHi RT HARC-PRO.	(Japan) Takumi Takahashi (Netherlands) Michael van der Mark	Honda CBR1000RR	1st
2014	(Japan) MuSASHi RT HARC-PRO.	(Japan) Takumi Takahashi (Netherlands) Michael van der Mark	Honda CBR1000RR	1st
2016	(Japan) Team Green Kawasaki	(Japan) Akira Yanagawa (Japan) Kazuma Watanabe	Kawasaki ZX-10R	2nd
2017	(Japan) Team Green Kawasaki	(Japan) Kazuma Watanabe (Malaysia) Azlan Shah Kamaruzaman	Kawasaki ZX-10RR	2nd
2018	(Japan) Team Green Kawasaki	(Japan) Kazuma Watanabe (United Kingdom) Jonathan Rea	Kawasaki ZX-10RR	3rd
2019	(Japan) Kawasaki Racing Team Suzuka 8H	(Turkey) Toprak Razgatlıoğlu (United Kingdom) Jonathan Rea	Kawasaki ZX-10RR	1st
2025	(Japan) SDG-Ducati Team Kagayama	(Japan) Ryo Mizuno (Germany) Marcel Schrötter	Ducati Panigale V4	29th
