= 2026 British Superbike Championship =

39th British motorcycle Championship

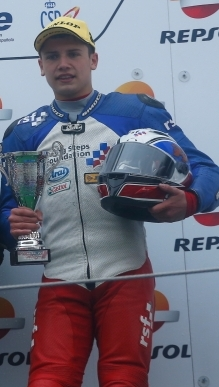
Kyle Ryde was the 2026 Riders' Champion

The 2026 British Superbike Championship season was the 39th season of the motorcycle championship and the 30th anniversary of the current format. Kyle Ryde won his third consecutive championship after entering the season as the defending champion. Ryde's team, Nitrous Competitions Racing, successfully defended their Ceratizit Teams' Trophy on the Ducati, after having won it last year on the Yamaha.

== Teams and riders ==
2026 Entry List
Team	Constructor	No.	Rider	Rounds
AJN Steelstock Bimota	Bimota	19	(England) Joe Talbot	All
AJN Steelstock Bimota	Bimota	30	(England) Max Cook	All
LEW 8TEN Racing BMW Motorrad	BMW	60	(England) Peter Hickman	1–2
ROKiT BMW Motorrad British Superbike Race Team	BMW	17	(Ukraine) Ilya Mikhalchik	All
Nitrous Coin Nitrous Competitions Racing Ducati	Ducati	1	(England) Kyle Ryde	All
Nitrous Coin Nitrous Competitions Racing Ducati	Ducati	2	(Northern Ireland) Glenn Irwin	All
Moto Rapido Racing	Ducati	91	(England) Leon Haslam	All
Hager PBM Racing Team	Ducati	45	(England) Scott Redding	All
Bathams AJN Racing	Ducati	79	(England) Storm Stacey	All
Bathams AJN Racing	Ducati	86	(England) Charlie Nesbitt	11
MET fonaCAB Racing Ducati	Ducati	18	(Northern Ireland) Andrew Irwin	1–2, 9-11
MET fonaCAB Racing Ducati	Ducati	8	(Northern Ireland) Graeme Irwin	3-7
MET fonaCAB Racing Ducati	Ducati	83	(England) Danny Buchan	8
Honda Racing UK	Honda	7	(England) Ryan Vickers	All
Honda Racing UK	Honda	22	(Australia) Jason O'Halloran	All
MasterMac Honda	Honda	12	(England) Daniel Brooks	6
MasterMac Honda	Honda	15	(Republic of Ireland) Eugene McManus	1–5, 7-11
MasterMac Honda	Honda	69	(Republic of Ireland) Rhys Irwin	All
DAO Racing Honda	Honda	14	(England) Lee Jackson	All
DAO Racing Honda	Honda	25	(Australia) Josh Brookes	All
TAG Racing Honda	Honda	4	(England) Scott Swann	9-11
TAG Racing Honda	Honda	86	(England) Charlie Nesbitt	1–8
TAG Racing Honda	Honda	89	(England) Fraser Rogers	All
Whitecliffe CDH Racing Honda	Honda	23	(England) Luke Hedger	1–3, 5, 8-11
Whitecliffe CDH Racing Honda	Honda	23	(England) Joe Sheldon-Shaw	6-7
Whitecliffe CDH Racing Honda	Honda	99	(England) Ben Luxton	4
NP Racing Honda	Honda	33	(England) Connor Thomson	1
NP Racing Honda	Honda	51	(Australia) Brayden Elliott	3-8, 10-11
SM Racing Honda	Honda	5	(Republic of Ireland) Richard Kerr	All
McAMS Yamaha	Yamaha	28	(England) Bradley Ray	All
Cheshire Mouldings Yamaha	Yamaha	11	(Scotland) Rory Skinner	All
Cheshire Mouldings Yamaha	Yamaha	52	(England) Danny Kent	All
Sencat Racing Yamaha	Yamaha	21	(England) Christian Iddon	All

Key
Regular rider
Wildcard rider
Replacement rider

=== Team changes ===
- After a decade on Kawasaki machinery, AJN Steelstock FS-3 Racing switched to using Bimota, on the back of the Italian constructor's successful debut season in the Superbike World Championship in 2025.
- IWR moved away from Honda machinery to become the support team for BMW factory rider Ilya Mikhalchik's debut entry into the championship.
- Despite winning the previous year's championship with Yamaha machinery, Nitrous Competitions Racing switched to Ducati on the new Panigale V4R.
- Bathams Racing also switched to Ducati after a single season with BMW.
- Andrew Irwin entered his own team into the championship by acquiring the previous-generation Ducati from PBM, who along with Nitrous Competitions and Moto Rapido, have received 2026-spec machinery directly from the Ducati factory in Bologna.
- SM Racing are a new single-bike entry for this season, run by Sean Meighan and utilising a Honda Fireblade.
- TAS Racing switched from Ducati to Yamaha and expanded to a two-bike entry by acquiring the equipment of Mar-Train Racing, who chose to leave the sport after 20 years.
- Sencat Racing moved away from Aprilia after two difficult seasons to run Yamaha machinery, which was purchased from Nitrous Competitions Racing upon their switch to Ducati, although despite announcing their intentions to be a two rider lineup, the official season entry list contained only one rider.

=== Rider changes ===
Christian Iddon left the AJN Steelstock FS-3 Racing team after a single season to join up with the Sencat Racing squad, to operate Yamaha in 2026 after purchasing the 2025 title-winning stock of Nitrous Competitions Racing. The vacant slot at FS-3 Racing for their first season running as the official factory-supported Bimota team will be filled by rookie Joe Talbot, who steps up from the British Supersport Championship. BMW factory-contracted rider Ilya Mikhalchik also debuts in the class for 2026, joining IWR. Scott Swann left the then-Honda IWR team at the end of 2025 and will instead run his own team in the National Superstock Championship. Honda Racing UK will have an all-new team for 2026, with Ryan Vickers returning from the Superbike World Championship to partner Jason O'Halloran who returns to BSB after a spell in the Endurance World Championship. They will take the places of Tommy Bridewell, who leaves the series after eighteen seasons to ride for Superbike Advocates in the Superbike World Championship, and Andrew Irwin who will run his own team in 2026 on a Ducati. Another team will a completely new lineup is MasterMac Honda, who have signed Irish pair Eugene McManus and Rhys Irwin from the British Supersport class to replace John McPhee, who moves to Endurance World Championship racing, and Charlie Nesbitt who has moved to TAG Racing to partner Fraser Rogers at the expense of Jaimie van Sikkelerus. Connor Thomson joins the series full-time with NP Racing despite not racing at all in 2025, after a wildcard entry with the team at the end of 2024. Richard Kerr remains in the championship for another season, moving from the MLav Racing-backed BMW to SM Racing Honda. Danny Kent joins Cheshire Mouldings TAS Racing for this season as the squad expand to running two bikes in the Superbike class, utilising the same Yamaha he ran with the Mar-Train Racing team which ceased operations at the end of 2025. Billy McConnell was left without a ride as his Look Forward Racing Honda team opted not to continue for 2026, but he joined Superstock 1000 with C&L Fairburn Properties.

== Race Calendar ==
2026 British Superbike Championship circuit locations in the United Kingdom
Location of Assen within the Netherlands which will host round 9 of the championship

Round		Circuit	Date
1	R1	Oulton Park (International Circuit, Cheshire)	2–4 May
1	R2	Oulton Park (International Circuit, Cheshire)	2–4 May
1	R3	Oulton Park (International Circuit, Cheshire)	2–4 May
2	R1	Donington Park (Grand Prix Circuit, Leicestershire)	15–17 May
2	R2	Donington Park (Grand Prix Circuit, Leicestershire)	15–17 May
2	R3	Donington Park (Grand Prix Circuit, Leicestershire)	15–17 May
3	R1	Knockhill Racing Circuit (Fife)	19–21 June
3	R2	Knockhill Racing Circuit (Fife)	19–21 June
3	R3	Knockhill Racing Circuit (Fife)	19–21 June
4	R1	Snetterton Motor Racing Circuit (300 Circuit, Norfolk)	3–5 July
4	R2	Snetterton Motor Racing Circuit (300 Circuit, Norfolk)	3–5 July
4	R3	Snetterton Motor Racing Circuit (300 Circuit, Norfolk)	3–5 July
5	R1	Brands Hatch (Grand Prix Circuit, Kent)	17–19 July
5	R2	Brands Hatch (Grand Prix Circuit, Kent)	17–19 July
5	R3	Brands Hatch (Grand Prix Circuit, Kent)	17–19 July
6	R1	Oulton Park (International Circuit, Cheshire)	31 July–2 August
6	R2	Oulton Park (International Circuit, Cheshire)	31 July–2 August
6	R3	Oulton Park (International Circuit, Cheshire)	31 July–2 August
7	R1	Thruxton Circuit (Hampshire)	14–16 August
7	R2	Thruxton Circuit (Hampshire)	14–16 August
7	R3	Thruxton Circuit (Hampshire)	14–16 August
8	R1	Cadwell Park (Lincolnshire)	29–31 August
8	R2	Cadwell Park (Lincolnshire)	29–31 August
8	R3	Cadwell Park (Lincolnshire)	29–31 August
The Showdown
9	R1	TT Circuit Assen (Grand Prix Circuit, Netherlands)	18–20 September
9	R2	TT Circuit Assen (Grand Prix Circuit, Netherlands)	18–20 September
9	R3	TT Circuit Assen (Grand Prix Circuit, Netherlands)	18–20 September
10	R1	Donington Park (Grand Prix Circuit, Leicestershire)	2–4 October
10	R2	Donington Park (Grand Prix Circuit, Leicestershire)	2–4 October
10	R3	Donington Park (Grand Prix Circuit, Leicestershire)	2–4 October
The Showdown Finale
11	R1	Brands Hatch (Grand Prix Circuit, Kent)	16–18 October
11	R2	Brands Hatch (Grand Prix Circuit, Kent)	16–18 October
11	R3	Brands Hatch (Grand Prix Circuit, Kent)	16–18 October

=== Calendar changes ===
The calendar is largely unchanged from 2025. Snetterton and Knockhill have swapped their 2025 slots as hosts for rounds three and four, while the second visit to Donington Park this season forms the second round of the Showdown, accommodated by the second Oulton Park meet moving into the regular season at round six.

== Results ==
Main Season
Round		Circuit	Date	Pole position	Fastest lap	Winning rider	Winning team
1	R1	(England) Oulton Park	3 May	(England) Kyle Ryde	(England) Kyle Ryde	(England) Kyle Ryde	Nitrous Coin Nitrous Competitions Racing Ducati
1	R2	(England) Oulton Park	4 May	(England) Kyle Ryde	(England) Bradley Ray	(England) Kyle Ryde	Nitrous Coin Nitrous Competitions Racing Ducati
1	R3	(England) Oulton Park	4 May	(England) Bradley Ray	(England) Kyle Ryde	(England) Kyle Ryde	Nitrous Coin Nitrous Competitions Racing Ducati
2	R1	(England) Donington Park	16 May	(England) Kyle Ryde	(England) Scott Redding	(England) Scott Redding	Hager PBM Racing Team
2	R2	(England) Donington Park	17 May	(England) Scott Redding	(England) Kyle Ryde	(England) Kyle Ryde	Nitrous Coin Nitrous Competitions Racing Ducati
2	R3	(England) Donington Park	17 May	(England) Kyle Ryde	(England) Kyle Ryde	(England) Kyle Ryde	Nitrous Coin Nitrous Competitions Racing Ducati
3	R1	(Scotland) Knockhill	20 June	(England) Kyle Ryde	(England) Kyle Ryde	(England) Kyle Ryde	Nitrous Coin Nitrous Competitions Racing Ducati
3	R2	(Scotland) Knockhill	21 June	(England) Kyle Ryde	(England) Bradley Ray	(England) Kyle Ryde	Nitrous Coin Nitrous Competitions Racing Ducati
3	R3	(Scotland) Knockhill	21 June	(England) Bradley Ray	(England) Bradley Ray	(England) Scott Redding	Hager PBM Racing Team
4	R1	(England) Snetterton	4 July	(England) Bradley Ray	(England) Scott Redding	(England) Bradley Ray	McAMS Yamaha
4	R2	(England) Snetterton	5 July	(England) Scott Redding	(England) Scott Redding	(England) Scott Redding	Hager PBM Racing Team
4	R3	(England) Snetterton	5 July	(England) Scott Redding	(England) Kyle Ryde	(England) Kyle Ryde	Nitrous Coin Nitrous Competitions Racing Ducati
5	R1	(England) Brands Hatch	18 July	(England) Kyle Ryde	(England) Scott Redding	(England) Kyle Ryde	Nitrous Coin Nitrous Competitions Racing Ducati
5	R2	(England) Brands Hatch	19 July	(England) Scott Redding	(England) Kyle Ryde	(England) Kyle Ryde	Nitrous Coin Nitrous Competitions Racing Ducati
5	R3	(England) Brands Hatch	19 July	(England) Kyle Ryde	(England) Kyle Ryde	(England) Scott Redding	Hager PBM Racing Team
6	R1	(England) Oulton Park	1 August	(England) Max Cook	(England) Bradley Ray	(England) Bradley Ray	McAMS Yamaha
6	R2	(England) Oulton Park	2 August	(England) Bradley Ray	(England) Kyle Ryde	(England) Kyle Ryde	Nitrous Coin Nitrous Competitions Racing Ducati
6	R3	(England) Oulton Park	2 August	(England) Kyle Ryde	(England) Scott Redding	(England) Kyle Ryde	Nitrous Coin Nitrous Competitions Racing Ducati
7	R1	(England) Thruxton	15 August	(England) Kyle Ryde	(England) Bradley Ray	(England) Kyle Ryde	Nitrous Coin Nitrous Competitions Racing Ducati
7	R2	(England) Thruxton	16 August	(England) Bradley Ray	(England) Bradley Ray	(England) Ryan Vickers	Honda Racing UK
7	R3	(England) Thruxton	16 August	(England) Bradley Ray	(England) Leon Haslam	(England) Ryan Vickers	Honda Racing UK
8	R1	(England) Cadwell Park	30 August	(England) Bradley Ray	(England) Ryan Vickers	(Scotland) Rory Skinner	Cheshire Mouldings Yamaha
8	R2	(England) Cadwell Park	31 August	(England) Ryan Vickers	(England) Bradley Ray	(England) Ryan Vickers	Honda Racing UK
8	R3	(England) Cadwell Park	31 August	(England) Bradley Ray	(England) Bradley Ray	(England) Ryan Vickers	Honda Racing UK
The Showdown
9	R1	(Netherlands) Assen	19 September	(England) Leon Haslam	(England) Scott Redding	(England) Scott Redding	Hager PBM Racing Team
9	R2	(Netherlands) Assen	20 September	(England) Scott Redding	(England) Bradley Ray	(England) Scott Redding	Hager PBM Racing Team
9	R3	(Netherlands) Assen	20 September	(England) Bradley Ray	(England) Ryan Vickers	(England) Kyle Ryde	Nitrous Coin Nitrous Competitions Racing Ducati
10	R1	(England) Donington Park	3 October	(England) Kyle Ryde	(England) Kyle Ryde	(England) Kyle Ryde	Nitrous Coin Nitrous Competitions Racing Ducati
10	R2	(England) Donington Park	4 October	(England) Kyle Ryde	(England) Kyle Ryde	(England) Kyle Ryde	Nitrous Coin Nitrous Competitions Racing Ducati
10	R3	(England) Donington Park	4 October	(England) Kyle Ryde	(England) Scott Redding	(England) Scott Redding	Hager PBM Racing Team
11	R1	(England) Brands Hatch	17 October	(England) Kyle Ryde	(England) Scott Redding	(England) Scott Redding	Hager PBM Racing Team
11	R2	(England) Brands Hatch	18 October	(England) Scott Redding	(England) Scott Redding	(England) Scott Redding	Hager PBM Racing Team
11	R3	(England) Brands Hatch	18 October	(England) Scott Redding	(England) Kyle Ryde	(England) Ryan Vickers	Honda Racing UK

== Championship Standings ==
=== Riders' Championship ===
Scoring system in the Main season

Points are awarded to the top fifteen finishers. A rider has to finish the race to earn points.

Position	1st	2nd	3rd	4th	5th	6th	7th	8th	9th	10th	11th	12th	13th	14th	15th
Points	18	16	14	12	11	10	9	8	7	6	5	4	3	2	1

Scoring system in the first two rounds in the showdown

Points are awarded to the top fifteen finishers. A rider has to finish the race to earn points.

Position	1st	2nd	3rd	4th	5th	6th	7th	8th	9th	10th	11th	12th	13th	14th	15th
Points	25	22	20	18	16	14	12	10	8	6	5	4	3	2	1

Scoring system in the season finale

Points are awarded to the top fifteen finishers. A rider has to finish the race to earn points.

Position	1st	2nd	3rd	4th	5th	6th	7th	8th	9th	10th	11th	12th	13th	14th	15th
Points	35	30	27	24	22	20	18	16	14	12	10	8	6	4	2

Pos.	Rider	Bike	OUL (England)			DON (England)			KNO (Scotland)			SNE (England)			BRH (England)			OUL (England)			THR (England)			CAD (England)			ASS (Netherlands)			DON (England)			BRH (England)			Pts.
Pos.	Rider	Bike	R1	R2	R3	R1	R2	R3	R1	R2	R3	R1	R2	R3	R1	R2	R3	R1	R2	R3	R1	R2	R3	R1	R2	R3	R1	R2	R3	R1	R2	R3	R1	R2	R3	Pts.
1	(England) Kyle Ryde	Ducati	1^{P F}	1^{P}	1^{F}	3^{P}	1^{F}	1^{P F}	1^{P F}	1^{P}	3	3	3	1^{F}	1^{P}	1^{F}	2^{P F}	2	1^{F}	1^{P}	1^{P}	4	3	2	3	3	2	3	1	1^{P F}	1^{P F}	Ret^{P}	2^{P}	3	2^{F}	596
2	(England) Scott Redding	Ducati	5	4	4	1^{F}	2^{P}	2	2	3	1	2^{F}	1^{P F}	2^{P}	2^{F}	2^{P}	1	5	3	2^{F}	5	2	Ret	4	9	15	1^{F}	1^{P}	3	4	2	1^{F}	1^{F}	1^{P F}	4^{P}	550
3	(England) Bradley Ray	Yamaha	3	3^{F}	3^{P}	7	4	4	Ret	2^{F}	2^{P F}	1^{P}	Ret	3	8	4	8	1^{F}	2^{P}	3	4^{F}	3^{P F}	2^{P}	Ret^{P}	2^{F}	2^{P F}	5	2^{F}	2^{P}	3	4	4	7	2	14	457
4	(England) Ryan Vickers	Honda	8	7	8	Ret	12	8	4	Ret	4	5	NC	4	6	5	6	6	4	4	3	1	1	Ret^{F}	1^{P}	1	4	4	4^{F}	2	3	3	3	5	1	435
5	(England) Leon Haslam	Ducati	2	2	2	4	5	5	8	6	8	4	Ret	5	4	6	4	3	Ret	5	6	5	4^{F}	3	4	5	3^{P}	DNS	6	6	Ret	Ret	4	4	6	376
6	(England) Max Cook	Bimota	6	6	7	2	3	3	Ret	5	7	Ret	2	Ret	3	3	3	Ret^{P}	5	6	Ret	WD	WD	7	7	8	8	5	5	5	5	2	5	6	5	358
7	(Scotland) Rory Skinner	Yamaha	7	8	6	6	6	7	5	Ret	5	DNS	4	6	9	9	7	Ret	12	7	2	6	5	1	Ret	Ret	6	DNS	7	Ret	Ret	5	6	8	19	269
8	(England) Joe Talbot	Bimota	10	9	13	13	13	Ret	12	Ret	13	6	6	8	Ret	12	10	7	6	Ret	9	8	Ret	Ret	5	4	Ret	Ret	Ret	9	6	6	8	7	3	221
9	(England) Danny Kent	Yamaha	16	14	12	9	10	10	11	9	DNS	11	7	11	12	11	9	14	DNS	Ret	8	7	6	8	10	13	9	13	8	7	9	7	9	10	9	211
10	(England) Lee Jackson	Honda	11	10	11	10	11	Ret	10	8	11	10	9	13	10	13	11	11	11	10	11	15	13	6	8	11	12	9	13	11	7	10	10	11	12	192
11	(England) Christian Iddon	Yamaha	9	11	10	5	7	Ret	7	Ret	10	Ret	5	7	5	7	Ret	9	10	Ret	7	16	8	Ret	15	7	Ret	Ret	16	10	Ret	8	11	9	8	189
12	(Australia) Jason O'Halloran	Honda	15	12	14	15	16	12	Ret	12	12	8	8	9	15	15	12	8	7	Ret	14	9	Ret	5	6	6	10	7	9	13	10	13	12	12	7	178
13	(England) Storm Stacey	Ducati	4	5	9	8	9	Ret	6	4	Ret	Ret	Ret	Ret	14	Ret	14	4	8	8	10	Ret	DNS	Ret	11	9	13	11	14	8	12	11	13	16	10	164
14	(Northern Ireland) Glenn Irwin	Ducati	12	Ret	5	12	8	6	3	Ret	6	DNS	WD	WD	7	8	5	10	9	Ret	16	11	12	Ret	Ret	14	11	8	10	Ret	8	Ret	18	15	16	146
15	(Australia) Josh Brookes	Honda	13	13	15	11	Ret	9	9	7	9	7	Ret	10	11	10	Ret	12	Ret	11	18	12	9	9	12	12	14	15	12	12	14	12	15	13	13	134
16	(Ukraine) Ilya Mikhalchik	BMW	18	17	17	Ret	18	Ret	13	10	14	9	Ret	12	13	14	13	13	13	9	Ret	13	Ret	10	13	10	7	6	Ret	Ret	11	9	16	Ret	15	102
17	(England) Fraser Rogers	Honda	14	15	Ret	Ret	Ret	Ret	16	11	16	12	11	14	Ret	16	Ret	Ret	15	12	13	14	11	11	14	16	16	12	Ret	Ret	Ret	17	Ret	18	11	55
18	(England) Charlie Nesbitt	Honda and Ducati	Ret	Ret	16	Ret	14	Ret	14	13	15	DNS	WD	WD	WD	WD	WD	16	14	14	15	10	7	13	16	19							20	19	18	31
19	(Republic of Ireland) Rhys Irwin	Honda	19	Ret	Ret	16	17	13	Ret	14	17	13	12	15	16	18	17	15	Ret	13	19	18	14	12	17	18	15	Ret	17	14	13	16	17	Ret	22	29
20	(Republic of Ireland) Eugene McManus	Honda	Ret	Ret	Ret	Ret	19	Ret	Ret	17	DNS	14	10	Ret	Ret	WD	WD				12	17	10	15	Ret	Ret	18	16	Ret	Ret	Ret	Ret	Ret	Ret	Ret	19
21	(Northern Ireland) Andrew Irwin	Ducati	17	16	19	Ret	15	Ret																			Ret	10	11	15	15	15	19	17	Ret	15
22	(England) Scott Swann	Honda																									17	14	15	16	17	14	14	14	23	13
23	(England) Luke Hedger	Honda	Ret	18	Ret	14	Ret	11	Ret	Ret	DNS				Ret	17	15							14	19	DNS	Ret	17	19	18	16	DNS	Ret	20	17	10
24	(Northern Ireland) Graeme Irwin	Ducati							DNS	15	18	DNS	13	Ret	17	Ret	Ret	18	Ret	16	21	Ret	15													5
25	(Republic of Ireland) Richard Kerr	Honda	21	20	18	Ret	Ret	DNS	15	Ret	Ret	DNS	14	16	Ret	Ret	16	17	16	15	17	WD	WD	Ret	WD	WD	Ret	18	18	17	18	Ret	22	Ret	20	4
26	(Australia) Brayden Elliott	Honda							Ret	16	Ret	15	Ret	Ret	Ret	19	Ret	19	17	Ret	20	19	16	17	20	Ret				19	19	DNS	21	21	21	1
	(England) Danny Buchan	Ducati																						16	18	17										
	(England) Ben Luxton	Honda										16	WD	WD																						
	(England) Joe Sheldon-Shaw	Honda																21	18	18	22	20	17													
	(England) Daniel Brooks	Honda																20	Ret	17																
	(England) Peter Hickman	BMW	20	19	Ret	Ret	Ret	DNS																												
	(England) Connor Thomson	Honda	DNS	WD	WD																															
Pos.	Rider	Bike	R1	R2	R3	R1	R2	R3	R1	R2	R3	R1	R2	R3	R1	R2	R3	R1	R2	R3	R1	R2	R3	R1	R2	R3	R1	R2	R3	R1	R2	R3	R1	R2	R3	Pts.
Pos.	Rider	Bike	OUL (England)			DON (England)			KNO (Scotland)			SNE (England)			BRH (England)			OUL (England)			THR (England)			CAD (England)			ASS (Netherlands)			DON (England)			BRH (England)			Pts.

Race key
Colour	Result
Gold	Winner
Silver	2nd place
Bronze	3rd place
Green	Points finish
Blue	Non-points finish
Blue	Non-classified finish (NC)
Purple	Retired (Ret)
Red	Did not qualify (DNQ)
Black	Disqualified (DSQ)
White	Did not start (DNS)
White	Withdrew (WD)
White	Race cancelled (C)
Blank	Did not practice (DNP)
Blank	Excluded (EX)
Blank	Did not arrive (DNA)
Blank	Did not enter (empty cell)
Annotation	Meaning
P	Pole position
F	Fastest lap
Rider key
Colour	Meaning
Light blue	Rookie rider

=== Manufacturers standings ===
Each manufacturer is awarded the same number of points as their best placed rider in each race.

Pos.	Constructor	OUL (England)			DON (England)			KNO (Scotland)			SNE (England)			BRH (England)			OUL (England)			THR (England)			CAD (England)			ASS (Netherlands)			DON (England)			BRH (England)			Pts
Pos.	Constructor	R1	R2	R3	R1	R2	R3	R1	R2	R3	R1	R2	R3	R1	R2	R3	R1	R2	R3	R1	R2	R3	R1	R2	R3	R1	R2	R3	R1	R2	R3	R1	R2	R3	Pts
1	(Italy) Ducati	1	1	1	1	1	1	1	1	1	2	1	1	1	1	1	2	1	1	1	2	3	2	3	3	1	1	1	1	1	1	1	1	2	662
2	(Japan) Yamaha	3	3	3	5	4	4	5	2	2	1	4	3	5	4	7	1	2	3	2	3	2	1	2	2	5	2	2	3	4	4	6	2	8	522
3	(Japan) Honda	8	7	8	10	11	8	4	7	4	5	8	4	6	5	6	6	4	4	3	1	1	5	1	1	4	4	4	2	3	3	3	5	1	470
4	(Italy) Bimota	6	6	7	2	3	3	12	5	7	6	2	8	3	3	3	7	5	6	9	8	Ret	7	5	4	8	5	5	5	5	2	5	6	3	415
5	(Germany) BMW	18	17	17	Ret	18	Ret	13	10	14	9	Ret	12	13	14	13	13	13	9	Ret	13	Ret	10	13	10	7	6	Ret	Ret	11	9	16	Ret	15	102
Pos.	Constructor	OUL (England)			DON (England)			KNO (Scotland)			SNE (England)			BRH (England)			OUL (England)			THR (England)			CAD (England)			ASS (Netherlands)			DON (England)			BRH (England)			Pts
Source:																																			Pts

=== Teams' Championship (Ceratizit Trophy) ===
The Teams' Championship, officially competing for the Ceratizit Trophy, awards points based on the performance of each team's single highest-finishing rider in each race. For multi-rider teams, only the points from the top-placed rider are counted toward the championship standings, ensuring equal opportunity for single-rider entries across the grid.

Pos.	Team	Constructor	OUL (England)			DON (England)			KNO (Scotland)			SNE (England)			BRH (England)			OUL (England)			THR (England)			CAD (England)			ASS (Netherlands)			DON (England)			BRH (England)			Pts
Pos.	Team	Constructor	R1	R2	R3	R1	R2	R3	R1	R2	R3	R1	R2	R3	R1	R2	R3	R1	R2	R3	R1	R2	R3	R1	R2	R3	R1	R2	R3	R1	R2	R3	R1	R2	R3	Pts
1	Nitrous Coin / Nitrous Competitions Racing	Ducati	1	1	1	3	1	1	1	1	3	3	3	1	1	1	2	2	1	1	1	4	3	2	3	3	2	3	1	1	1	Ret	2	3	2	596
2	Hager PBM Racing Team	Ducati	5	4	4	1	2	2	2	3	1	2	1	2	2	2	1	5	3	2	5	2	Ret	4	9	15	1	1	3	4	2	1	1	1	4	550
3	Honda Racing UK	Honda	8	7	8	15	12	8	4	12	4	5	8	4	6	5	6	6	4	4	3	1	1	5	1	1	4	4	4	2	3	3	3	5	1	459
4	McAMS Yamaha	Yamaha	3	3	3	7	4	4	Ret	2	2	1	Ret	3	8	4	8	1	2	3	4	3	2	Ret	2	2	5	2	2	3	4	4	7	2	14	457
5	AJN Steelstock Bimota	Bimota	6	6	7	2	3	3	12	5	7	6	2	8	3	3	3	7	5	6	9	8	Ret	7	5	4	8	5	5	5	5	2	5	6	3	415
6	Moto Rapido Racing	Ducati	2	2	2	4	5	5	8	6	8	4	Ret	5	4	6	4	3	Ret	5	6	5	4	3	4	5	3	DNS	6	6	Ret	Ret	4	4	6	376
7	Cheshire Mouldings Yamaha	Yamaha	7	8	6	6	6	7	5	9	5	11	4	6	9	9	7	14	12	7	2	6	5	1	10	13	6	13	7	7	9	5	6	8	9	329
8	DAO Racing Honda	Honda	11	10	11	10	11	9	9	7	9	7	9	10	10	10	11	11	11	10	11	12	9	6	8	11	12	9	12	11	7	10	10	11	12	220
9	SENCAT Racing Yamaha	Yamaha	9	11	10	5	7	Ret	7	Ret	10	Ret	5	7	5	7	Ret	9	10	Ret	7	16	8	Ret	15	7	Ret	Ret	16	10	Ret	8	11	9	8	189
10	Bathams AJN Racing	Ducati	4	5	9	8	9	Ret	6	4	Ret	Ret	Ret	Ret	14	Ret	14	4	8	8	10	Ret	DNS	Ret	11	9	13	11	14	8	12	11	13	16	10	164
11	ROKiT BMW Motorrad Superbike Team	BMW	18	17	17	Ret	18	Ret	13	10	14	9	Ret	12	13	14	13	13	13	9	Ret	13	Ret	10	13	10	7	6	Ret	Ret	11	9	16	Ret	15	102
12	TAG Racing Honda	Honda	14	15	16	Ret	14	Ret	14	11	15	12	11	14	Ret	16	Ret	16	14	12	13	10	7	11	14	16	16	12	15	16	17	14	14	14	11	80
13	MasterMac Honda	Honda	19	Ret	Ret	16	17	13	Ret	14	17	13	10	15	16	18	17	15	Ret	13	12	17	10	12	17	18	15	16	17	14	13	16	17	Ret	22	39
14	MET fonaCAB Racing	Ducati	17	16	19	Ret	15	Ret	DNS	15	18	DNS	13	Ret	17	Ret	Ret	18	Ret	16	21	Ret	15	16	18	17	Ret	10	11	15	15	15	19	17	Ret	20
15	Whitecliffe CDH Racing Honda	Honda	Ret	18	Ret	14	Ret	11	Ret	Ret	DNS	16	WD	WD	Ret	17	15	21	18	18	22	20	17	14	19	DNS	Ret	17	19	18	16	DNS	Ret	20	17	10
16	SM Racing	Honda	21	20	18	Ret	Ret	DNS	15	Ret	Ret	DNS	14	16	Ret	Ret	16	17	16	15	17	WD	WD	Ret	WD	WD	Ret	18	18	17	18	Ret	22	Ret	20	4
17	NP Racing Honda	Honda	DNS	WD	WD				Ret	16	Ret	15	Ret	Ret	Ret	19	Ret	19	17	Ret	20	19	16	17	20	Ret				19	19	DNS	21	21	21	1
18	LEW 8TEN Racing BMW Motorrad	BMW	20	19	Ret	Ret	Ret	DNS																												0
Pos.	Team	Constructor	OUL (England)			DON (England)			KNO (Scotland)			SNE (England)			BRH (England)			OUL (England)			THR (England)			CAD (England)			ASS (Netherlands)			DON (England)			BRH (England)			Pts
Source:																																				Pts
