= 2024 British Superbike Championship =

37th British motorcycle Championships

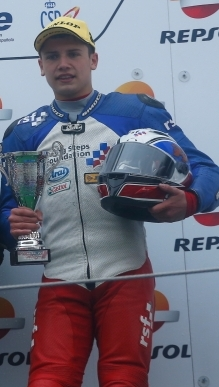
2024 champion, Kyle Ryde

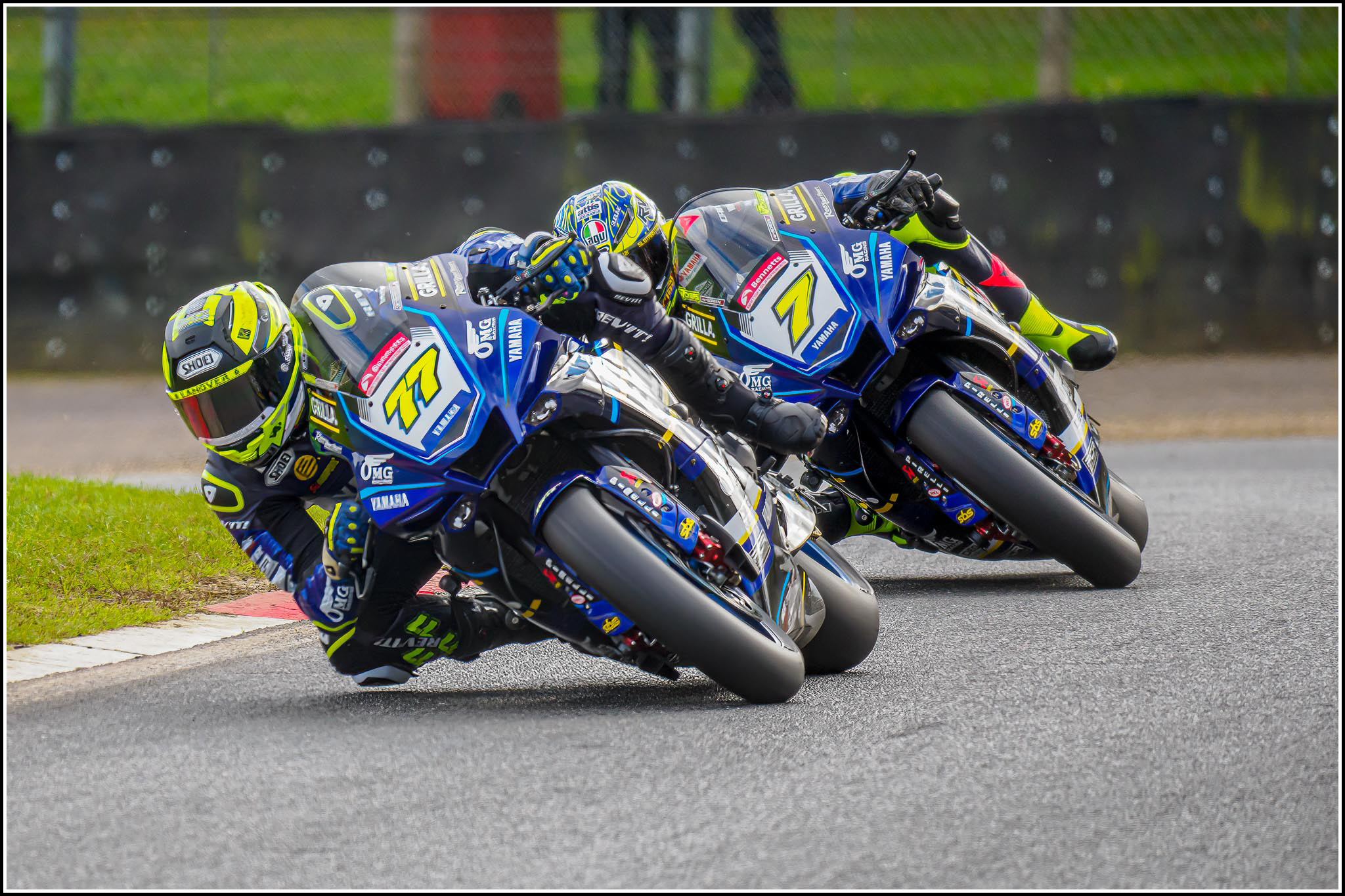
Ryde (left) and Ryan Vickers racing for team OMG GRILLA Yamaha Racing

The 2024 British Superbike Championship season is the 37th season of the motorcycle championship. Tommy Bridewell is the defending champion, having won the 2023 season by half a point over then-teammate Glenn Irwin. Kyle Ryde on a Yamaha R1 from OMG Racing claimed his first title defeating defending champion Tommy Bridewell by one point after prevailing in a head to head race in the final race of the season.

== Rule Changes ==
Incorporated into the 2024 season is a lesser-class of machine, entitled 'Pathway', to be run concurrently within the same scheduled events. The aim is to allow new participants to enter at a reduced cost with a machine closer in specification to Superstock 1000. Trials were held within some races during the 2023 season.

Two support classes were not carried on into 2024. The first, the National Junior Superstock Championship, was discontinued because there are only two manufacturers available with no future options and no ability for a balance of performance formula. The second, the British Junior Supersport Championship, was discontinued because there was only one viable manufacturer, making it a de facto one make series. It was replaced with a properly budgeted and technically controlled one make series with the new Kawasaki British Superteen Championship using Kawasaki Ninja ZX-4RR machines.

== Teams and riders ==
Riders with a superscript PW are part of the Pathway class.

Team	Constructor	No.	Rider	Rounds
IN Competition SENCAT Aprilia	Aprilia	8	(Scotland) Lewis Rollo^{PW}	All
Cheshire Mouldings BMW Motorrad	BMW	11	(Scotland) Rory Skinner	1–5, 7, 9–11
Cheshire Mouldings BMW Motorrad	BMW	15	(England) Richard Kerr	6, 8
FHO Racing BMW Motorrad	BMW	25	(Australia) Josh Brookes	All
FHO Racing BMW Motorrad	BMW	60	(England) Peter Hickman	All
ROKitLT Haslam Racing BMW Motorrad	BMW	91	(England) Leon Haslam	All
Hager PBM Ducati	Ducati	2	(Northern Ireland) Glenn Irwin	All
Oxford Racing Products Ducati	Ducati	12	(Spain) Xavi Forés	11
Oxford Racing Products Ducati	Ducati	21	(England) Christian Iddon	1–10
Honda Racing UK	Honda	1	(England) Tommy Bridewell	All
Honda Racing UK	Honda	18	(Northern Ireland) Andrew Irwin	All
Honda Racing UK	Honda	5	(England) Dean Harrison	1–6
C&L Fairburn Jackson Racing	Honda	3	(Australia) Billy McConnell	All
MasterMac Honda	Honda	14	(England) Lee Jackson	All
MasterMac Honda	Honda	86	(England) Charlie Nesbitt	All
Rapid Honda	Honda	27	(England) Tom Ward	8, 10
Rapid Honda	Honda	54	(England) Franco Bourne	1–7, 9
TAG Honda	Honda	74	(Netherlands) Jaimie van Sikkelerus^{PW}	1–6, 10–11
TAG Honda	Honda	89	(England) Fraser Rogers	1–4, 7–10
Cumins by Team IWR	Honda	4	(England) James Westmoreland^{PW}	10–11
Cumins by Team IWR	Honda	15	(England) Richard Kerr^{PW}	9
Cumins by Team IWR	Honda	75	(England) Alex Olsen^{PW}	1, 3–8
STAUFF Fluid Power Kawasaki; LKQ Euro Car Parts Kawasaki	Kawasaki	68	(England) Tom Neave	1, 4–7
STAUFF Fluid Power Kawasaki; LKQ Euro Car Parts Kawasaki	Kawasaki	68	(Finland) Eemeli Lahti	2
STAUFF Fluid Power Kawasaki; LKQ Euro Car Parts Kawasaki	Kawasaki	12	(England) Luke Mossey	3
STAUFF Fluid Power Kawasaki; LKQ Euro Car Parts Kawasaki	Kawasaki	79	(England) Storm Stacey	All
STAUFF Fluid Power Kawasaki; LKQ Euro Car Parts Kawasaki	Kawasaki	97	(England) Bradley Perie	8–11
CDH Racing Kawasaki	Kawasaki	23	(England) Luke Hedger	All
Completely Motorbikes Kawasaki	Kawasaki	22	(Australia) Jason O'Halloran	1–10
Completely Motorbikes Kawasaki	Kawasaki	30	(England) Max Cook	All
DAO Racing	Kawasaki	51	(Australia) Brayden Elliott	All
DAO Racing	Kawasaki	83	(England) Danny Buchan	1–9, 11
NP Racing Kawasaki	Kawasaki	33	(England) Connor Rossi Thomson	11
NP Racing Kawasaki	Kawasaki	37	(England) Corey Tinker	10
NP Racing Kawasaki	Kawasaki	55	(England) Louis Valleley	1–9
OMG GRILLA Yamaha Racing	Yamaha	7	(England) Ryan Vickers	All
OMG GRILLA Yamaha Racing	Yamaha	77	(England) Kyle Ryde	All
McAMS Racing Yamaha	Yamaha	52	(England) Danny Kent	All

== Race Calendar ==
2024 British Superbike UK Race Locations
Location of Navarra within Spain

Round		Circuit	Date
1	R1	Circuito de Navarra (Navarre, Spain)	19–21 April
1	R2	Circuito de Navarra (Navarre, Spain)	19–21 April
2	R1	Oulton Park (International Circuit, Cheshire)	4–6 May
2	R2	Oulton Park (International Circuit, Cheshire)	4–6 May
2	R3	Oulton Park (International Circuit, Cheshire)	4–6 May
3	R1	Donington Park (Grand Prix Circuit, Leicestershire)	17–19 May
3	R2	Donington Park (Grand Prix Circuit, Leicestershire)	17–19 May
3	R3	Donington Park (Grand Prix Circuit, Leicestershire)	17–19 May
4	R1	Knockhill Racing Circuit (Fife)	14–16 June
4	R2	Knockhill Racing Circuit (Fife)	14–16 June
4	R3	Knockhill Racing Circuit (Fife)	14–16 June
5	R1	Snetterton Motor Racing Circuit (300 Circuit, Norfolk)	5–7 July
5	R2	Snetterton Motor Racing Circuit (300 Circuit, Norfolk)	5–7 July
5	R3	Snetterton Motor Racing Circuit (300 Circuit, Norfolk)	5–7 July
6	R1	Brands Hatch (Grand Prix Circuit, Kent)	19–21 July
6	R2	Brands Hatch (Grand Prix Circuit, Kent)	19–21 July
6	R3	Brands Hatch (Grand Prix Circuit, Kent)	19–21 July
7	R1	Thruxton Circuit (Hampshire)	9–11 August
7	R2	Thruxton Circuit (Hampshire)	9–11 August
7	R3	Thruxton Circuit (Hampshire)	9–11 August
8	R1	Cadwell Park (Lincolnshire)	24–26 August
8	R2	Cadwell Park (Lincolnshire)	24–26 August
8	R3	Cadwell Park (Lincolnshire)	24–26 August
The Showdown
9	R1	Oulton Park (International Circuit, Cheshire)	13–15 September
9	R2	Oulton Park (International Circuit, Cheshire)	13–15 September
9	R3	Oulton Park (International Circuit, Cheshire)	13–15 September
10	R1	Donington Park (Grand Prix Circuit, Leicestershire)	27–29 September
10	R2	Donington Park (Grand Prix Circuit, Leicestershire)	27–29 September
10	R3	Donington Park (Grand Prix Circuit, Leicestershire)	27–29 September
The Showdown Finale
11	R1	Brands Hatch (Grand Prix Circuit, Kent)	11–13 October
11	R2	Brands Hatch (Grand Prix Circuit, Kent)	11–13 October
11	R3	Brands Hatch (Grand Prix Circuit, Kent)	11–13 October

== Results ==
Main Season
Round		Circuit	Date	Pole position	Fastest lap	Winning rider	Winning team
1	R1	(Spain) Circuito de Navarra	21 April	(England) Danny Kent	(England) Kyle Ryde	(England) Ryan Vickers	OMG GRILLA Yamaha Racing
1	R2	(Spain) Circuito de Navarra	21 April		(England) Tommy Bridewell	(England) Ryan Vickers	OMG GRILLA Yamaha Racing
2	R1	(England) Oulton Park	5 May	(England) Kyle Ryde	(Northern Ireland) Glenn Irwin	(Northern Ireland) Glenn Irwin	Hager PBM Ducati
2	R2	(England) Oulton Park	6 May		(England) Christian Iddon	(Northern Ireland) Glenn Irwin	Hager PBM Ducati
2	R3	(England) Oulton Park	6 May		(England) Christian Iddon	(Northern Ireland) Glenn Irwin	Hager PBM Ducati
3	R1	(England) Donington Park GP	18 May	(England) Ryan Vickers	(England) Christian Iddon	(England) Kyle Ryde	OMG GRILLA Yamaha Racing
3	R2	(England) Donington Park GP	19 May		(England) Danny Kent	(Northern Ireland) Glenn Irwin	Hager PBM Ducati
3	R3	(England) Donington Park GP	19 May		(England) Tommy Bridewell	(Australia) Jason O'Halloran	Completely Motorbikes Kawasaki
4	R1	(Scotland) Knockhill	15 June	(England) Tommy Bridewell	(England) Tommy Bridewell	(England) Tommy Bridewell	Honda Racing UK
4	R2	(Scotland) Knockhill	16 June		(England) Danny Kent	(Scotland) Rory Skinner	Cheshire Mouldings BMW Motorrad
4	R3	(Scotland) Knockhill	16 June		(England) Christian Iddon	(England) Christian Iddon	Oxford Products Racing Ducati
5	R1	(England) Snetterton 300	6 July	(England) Ryan Vickers	(England) Storm Stacey	(England) Storm Stacey	LKQ Euro Car Parts Kawasaki
5	R2	(England) Snetterton 300	7 July		(Northern Ireland) Glenn Irwin	(Northern Ireland) Glenn Irwin	Hager PBM Ducati
5	R3	(England) Snetterton 300	7 July		(England) Tommy Bridewell	(Northern Ireland) Glenn Irwin	Hager PBM Ducati
6	R1	(England) Brands Hatch GP	20 July	(England) Ryan Vickers	(England) Ryan Vickers	(England) Ryan Vickers	OMG GRILLA Yamaha Racing
6	R2	(England) Brands Hatch GP	21 July		(England) Ryan Vickers	(England) Ryan Vickers	OMG GRILLA Yamaha Racing
6	R3	(England) Brands Hatch GP	21 July		(England) Ryan Vickers	(England) Ryan Vickers	OMG GRILLA Yamaha Racing
7	R1	(England) Thruxton	10 August	(England) Kyle Ryde	(England) Max Cook	(England) Kyle Ryde	OMG GRILLA Yamaha Racing
7	R2	(England) Thruxton	11 August		(England) Ryan Vickers	(England) Ryan Vickers	OMG GRILLA Yamaha Racing
7	R3	(England) Thruxton	11 August		(England) Charlie Nesbitt	(England) Ryan Vickers	OMG GRILLA Yamaha Racing
8	R1	(England) Cadwell Park	25 August	(Australia) Jason O'Halloran	(England) Lee Jackson	(England) Kyle Ryde	OMG GRILLA Yamaha Racing
8	R2	(England) Cadwell Park	26 August		(England) Charlie Nesbitt	(England) Tommy Bridewell	Honda Racing UK
8	R3	(England) Cadwell Park	26 August		(England) Ryan Vickers	(England) Kyle Ryde	OMG GRILLA Yamaha Racing
The Showdown
9	R1	(England) Oulton Park International	14 September	(England) Kyle Ryde	(England) Kyle Ryde	(England) Kyle Ryde	OMG GRILLA Yamaha Racing
9	R2	(England) Oulton Park International	15 September		(Northern Ireland) Glenn Irwin	(Northern Ireland) Glenn Irwin	Hager PBM Ducati
9	R3	(England) Oulton Park International	15 September		(England) Kyle Ryde	(England) Kyle Ryde	OMG GRILLA Yamaha Racing
10	R1	(England) Donington Park GP	28 September	(England) Kyle Ryde	(England) Tommy Bridewell	(England) Kyle Ryde	OMG GRILLA Yamaha Racing
10	R2	(England) Donington Park GP	29 September		(Northern Ireland) Glenn Irwin	(Northern Ireland) Glenn Irwin	Hager PBM Ducati
10	R3	(England) Donington Park GP	29 September		(England) Kyle Ryde	(England) Kyle Ryde	OMG GRILLA Yamaha Racing
11	R1	(England) Brands Hatch GP	12 October	(England) Ryan Vickers	(England) Danny Kent	(England) Danny Kent	McAMS Racing Yamaha
11	R2	(England) Brands Hatch GP	13 October		(England) Tommy Bridewell	(England) Tommy Bridewell	Honda Racing UK
11	R3	(England) Brands Hatch GP	13 October		(England) Tommy Bridewell	(England) Kyle Ryde	OMG GRILLA Yamaha Racing

== Championship standings ==
=== Riders' championship ===
Scoring system in the Main season

Points are awarded to the top fifteen finishers. A rider has to finish the race to earn points.

Position	1st	2nd	3rd	4th	5th	6th	7th	8th	9th	10th	11th	12th	13th	14th	15th
Points	18	16	14	12	11	10	9	8	7	6	5	4	3	2	1

Scoring system in the first two rounds in the showdown

Points are awarded to the top fifteen finishers. A rider has to finish the race to earn points.

Position	1st	2nd	3rd	4th	5th	6th	7th	8th	9th	10th	11th	12th	13th	14th	15th
Points	25	22	20	18	16	14	12	10	8	6	5	4	3	2	1

Scoring system in the season finale

Points are awarded to the top fifteen finishers. A rider has to finish the race to earn points.

Position	1st	2nd	3rd	4th	5th	6th	7th	8th	9th	10th	11th	12th	13th	14th	15th
Points	35	30	27	24	22	20	18	16	14	12	10	8	6	4	2

Pos.	Rider	Bike	NAV (Spain)		OUL (England)			DON (England)			KNO (Scotland)			SNE (England)			BRH (England)			THR (England)			CAD (England)			OUL (England)			DON (England)			BRH (England)			Pts
Pos.	Rider	Bike	R1	R2	R1	R2	R3	R1	R2	R3	R1	R2	R3	R1	R2	R3	R1	R2	R3	R1	R2	R3	R1	R2	R3	R1	R2	R3	R1	R2	R3	R1	R2	R3	Pts
1	(England) Kyle Ryde	Yamaha	2	3	3	5	Ret	1	5	5	4	14	15	3	4	5	6	3	3	1	8	4	1	2	1	1	13	1	1	3	1	4	2	1	487
2	(England) Tommy Bridewell	Honda	7	Ret	4	2	6	2	3	2	1	3	2	Ret	2	2	2	2	4	4	7	6	4	1	2	Ret	4	2	2	2	5	3	1	2	486
3	(Northern Ireland) Glenn Irwin	Ducati	4	8	1	1	1	5	1	4	Ret	8	9	5	1	1	4	DNS	7	14	DNS	15	5	5	5	2	1	9	3	1	4	Ret	10	7	382
4	(England) Danny Kent	Yamaha	3	2	6	4	4	4	4	3	7	Ret	3	Ret	6	4	Ret	DNS	15	Ret	3	2	14	Ret	12	7	2	5	5	4	2	1	4	4	373
5	(England) Ryan Vickers	Yamaha	1	1	5	7	3	Ret	Ret	WD	Ret	WD	WD	9	7	8	1	1	1	2	1	1	Ret	6	Ret	5	12	DNS	7	11	3	2	3	3	349
6	(England) Christian Iddon	Ducati	6	5	2	3	2	Ret	6	9	Ret	2	1	6	3	3	5	6	2	9	6	13	13	9	8	Ret	Ret	6	10	8	Ret				261
7	(England) Lee Jackson	Honda	14	12	14	11	11	7	12	8	8	9	10	DNS	12	11	8	7	6	7	11	7	2	3	3	3	7	7	8	7	9	13	12	Ret	251
8	(Australia) Josh Brookes	BMW	Ret	11	9	7	8	10	8	Ret	6	12	11	13	10	7	11	8	11	16	4	8	7	7	6	4	16	10	9	10	11	7	5	6	249
9	(England) Leon Haslam	BMW	11	4	10	8	5	3	2	6	10	Ret	Ret	8	24	Ret	7	5	10	6	9	10	8	8	7	6	3	13	11	Ret	10	Ret	11	Ret	228
10	(Northern Ireland) Andrew Irwin	Honda	16	13	16	14	15	14	9	7	3	Ret	Ret	7	5	6	3	4	5	Ret	14	9	DNS	WD	WD	12	9	8	4	6	6	11	6	9	226
11	(England) Charlie Nesbitt	Honda	9	9	11	13	13	9	7	11	9	5	8	Ret	9	10	Ret	10	9	Ret	12	5	3	4	4	Ret	Ret	Ret	6	5	7	Ret	9	8	223
12	(England) Max Cook	Kawasaki	8	7	Ret	10	9	6	Ret	10	Ret	10	Ret	Ret	13	12	12	13	12	8	2	Ret	16	16	14	10	15	4	12	9	8	6	7	5	203
13	(Australia) Jason O'Halloran	Kawasaki	10	6	7	6	7	8	Ret	1	5	Ret	Ret	4	8	9	9	11	8	3	WD	WD	6	10	WD	9	6	DNS	13	12	Ret				187
14	(England) Storm Stacey	Kawasaki	Ret	15	Ret	12	10	DNS	16	15	12	4	13	1	14	15	Ret	14	17	13	10	14	11	13	13	14	8	3	16	14	13	9	13	12	141
15	(England) Peter Hickman	BMW	12	10	13	15	Ret	WD	WD	WD	Ret	Ret	WD	Ret	15	14	15	12	13	10	13	12	12	15	9	8	14	11	14	13	Ret	5	8	11	120
16	(Australia) Billy McConnell	Honda	15	14	Ret	19	17	11	Ret	14	16	7	5	DNS	WD	WD	14	DNS	14	5	5	3	9	12	10	13	11	DNS	DSQ	16	Ret	Ret	14	10	111
17	(Scotland) Rory Skinner	BMW	5	Ret	8	DNS	DNS	WD	WD	WD	2	1	4	DNS	WD	WD				DNS	WD	WD				11	Ret	DNS	15	15	12	Ret	Ret	DNS	76
18	(Scotland) Lewis Rollo^{PW}	Aprilia	Ret	Ret	17	17	18	19	13	17	17	11	14	2	16	20	18	15	18	11	16	11	18	18	18	Ret	5	DNS	19	Ret	15	8	16	13	76
19	(England) Danny Buchan	Kawasaki	19	Ret	19	16	12	15	17	16	11	13	7	15	23	16	10	DNS	16	15	15	17	10	11	11	Ret	WD	WD				12	15	14	61
20	(England) Fraser Rogers	Honda	13	Ret	12	20	14	13	10	12	13	6	6							Ret	17	DNS	WD	WD	WD	17	10	DNS	17	17	Ret				51
21	(England) Franco Bourne	Honda	17	16	Ret	WD	WD	12	NC	Ret	15	Ret	17	10	11	13	Ret	9	Ret	17	Ret	DNS				WD	WD	WD							26
22	(England) Luke Hedger	Kawasaki	22	20	18	Ret	DNS	21	19	18	14	15	12	Ret	20	19	13	DNS	WD	19	19	19	Ret	20	20	Ret	19	15	Ret	18	Ret	14	Ret	Ret	15
23	(England) Dean Harrison	Honda	18	Ret	15	DNS	16	17	11	13	19	17	Ret	11	19	17	16	18	19																14
24	(England) James Westmoreland^{PW}	Honda																											21	19	17	10	18	16	12
25	(Australia) Brayden Elliott	Kawasaki	20	18	20	18	Ret	18	18	19	Ret	19	16	Ret	21	21	20	19	21	20	18	18	20	21	19	18	20	14	Ret	20	18	15	17	15	6
26	(England) Alex Olsen^{PW}	Honda	Ret	17				20	15	DNS	18	18	Ret	16	18	Ret	17	17	20	12	Ret	16	19	23	17										5
27	(England) Richard Kerr	BMW															19	16	22				Ret	19	21										4
27	(England) Richard Kerr	Honda																								16	18	12							4
28	(England) Tom Neave	Kawasaki	Ret	DNS							DNS	16	Ret	12	17	18	WD	WD	WD	18	WD	WD													4
29	(England) Bradley Perie	Kawasaki																					17	17	15	15	17	DNS	18	21	14	WD	WD	WD	4
30	(England) Tom Ward	Honda																					15	14	16				20	Ret	16				3
31	(England) Luke Mossey	Kawasaki						16	14	Ret																									2
32	(England) Louis Valleley	Kawasaki	Ret	Ret	23	23	21	Ret	DNS	20	NC	Ret	18	14	DNS	DNS	22	20	24	21	20	20	21	22	Ret	Ret	21	DNS							2
33	(Netherlands) Jaimie van Sikkelerus^{PW}	Honda	21	19	22	21	20	Ret	WD	WD	20	20	Ret	Ret	22	22	21	21	23										WD	WD	WD	WD	WD	WD	0
34	(Finland) Eemeli Lahti	Kawasaki			21	22	19																												0
35	(England) Corey Tinker	Kawasaki																											22	22	19				0
36	(Spain) Xavi Forés	Ducati																														Ret	19	Ret	0
37	(England) Connor Rossi Thomson	Kawasaki																														Ret	Ret	Ret	0
Pos.	Rider	Bike	NAV (Spain)		OUL (England)			DON (England)			KNO (Scotland)			SNE (England)			BRH (England)			THR (England)			CAD (England)			OUL (England)			DON (England)			BRH (England)			Pts

Race key
Colour	Result
Gold	Winner
Silver	2nd place
Bronze	3rd place
Green	Points finish
Blue	Non-points finish
Blue	Non-classified finish (NC)
Purple	Retired (Ret)
Red	Did not qualify (DNQ)
Black	Disqualified (DSQ)
White	Did not start (DNS)
White	Withdrew (WD)
White	Race cancelled (C)
Blank	Did not practice (DNP)
Blank	Excluded (EX)
Blank	Did not arrive (DNA)
Blank	Did not enter (empty cell)
Annotation	Meaning
P	Pole position
F	Fastest lap
Rider key
Colour	Meaning
Light blue	Rookie rider

=== Manufacturers standings ===
Each manufacturer is awarded the same number of points as their best placed rider in each race.

Pos.	Constructor	NAV (Spain)		OUL (England)			DON (England)			KNO (Scotland)			SNE (England)			BRH (England)			THR (England)			CAD (England)			OUL (England)			DON (England)			BRH (England)			Pts
Pos.	Constructor	R1	R2	R1	R2	R3	R1	R2	R3	R1	R2	R3	R1	R2	R3	R1	R2	R3	R1	R2	R3	R1	R2	R3	R1	R2	R3	R1	R2	R3	R1	R2	R3	Pts
1	(Japan) Yamaha	1	1	3	4	3	1	4	3	4	6	3	3	4	4	1	1	1	1	1	1	1	2	1	1	2	1	1	3	1	1	2	1	596
2	(Japan) Honda	7	9	4	2	6	2	3	2	1	3	2	7	2	2	2	2	4	4	5	3	2	1	2	3	4	2	2	2	5	3	1	2	532
3	(Italy) Ducati	4	5	1	1	1	5	1	4	Ret	8	1	5	1	1	4	6	2	9	6	13	5	5	5	2	1	6	3	1	4	Ret	10	7	436
4	(Germany) BMW	5	4	8	7	5	3	2	6	2	1	4	8	10	7	7	5	10	6	4	8	7	7	6	4	3	10	9	10	10	5	5	6	372
5	(Japan) Kawasaki	8	6	7	6	7	6	14	1	5	4	7	1	8	9	9	11	8	3	2	14	6	10	11	9	6	3	12	9	8	6	7	5	338
6	(Italy) Aprilia	Ret	Ret	17	17	18	19	13	17	17	11	14	2	16	20	18	15	18	11	16	11	18	18	18	Ret	5	DNS	19	Ret	15	8	16	13	76
Pos.	Constructor	NAV (Spain)		OUL (England)			DON (England)			KNO (Scotland)			SNE (England)			BRH (England)			THR (England)			CAD (England)			OUL (England)			DON (England)			BRH (England)			Pts
Source:																																		Pts
