= 2019 British Superbike Championship =

British motorcycle racing season

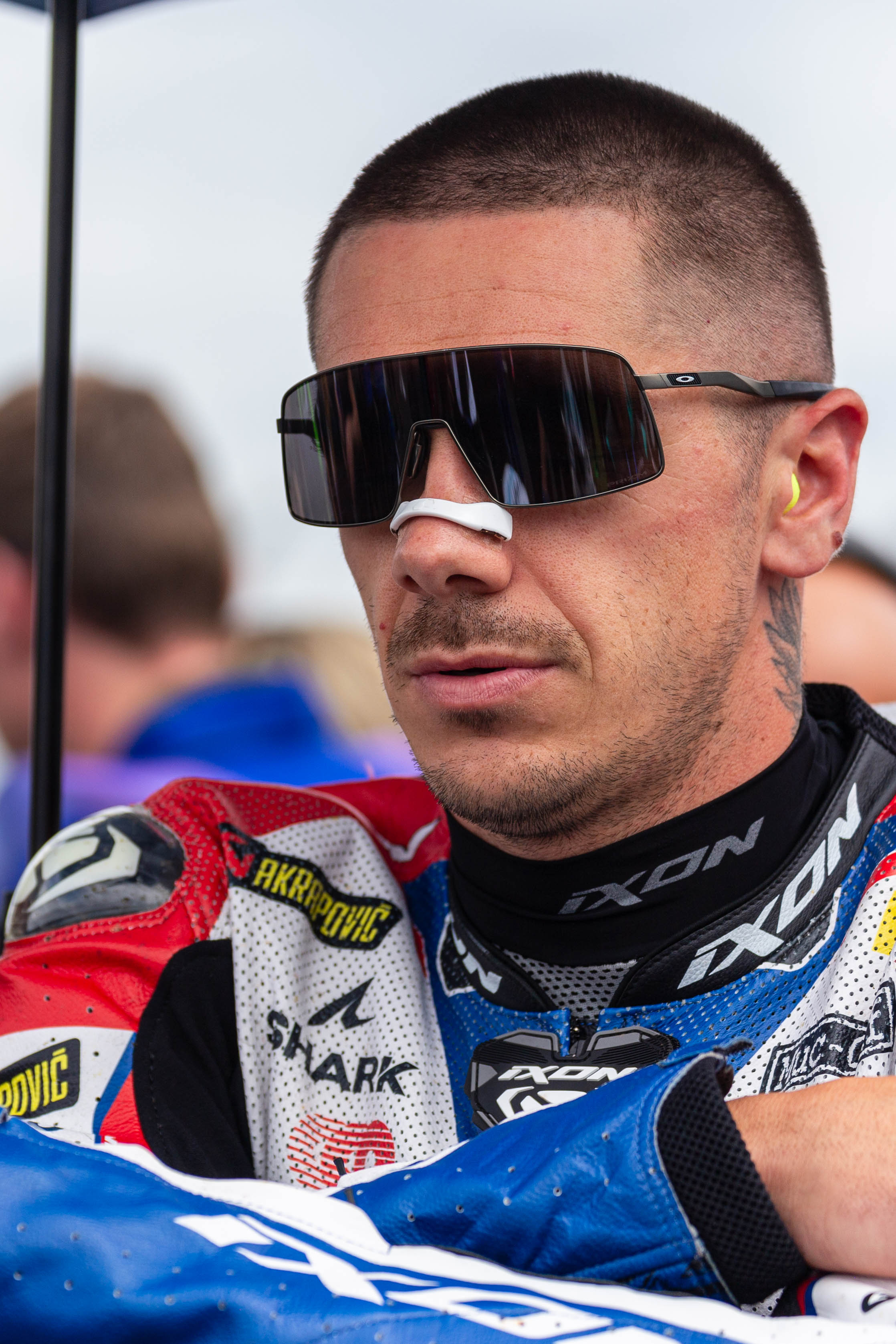
2019 champion, Scott Redding

The 2019 British Superbike Championship season was the 32nd British Superbike Championship season. Be Wiser Ducati traded most of their wins between both their riders with Scott Redding narrowly holding on the Championship Title over teammate Josh Brookes.

== Teams and riders ==
2019 Entry List
Team	Constructor	No.	Rider	Rounds
Quattro Plant JG Speedfit Kawasaki	Kawasaki	2	(Northern Ireland) Glenn Irwin	1–5
Quattro Plant JG Speedfit Kawasaki	Kawasaki	37	(England) James Hillier	1–2
Quattro Plant JG Speedfit Kawasaki	Kawasaki	61	(Australia) Ben Currie	1–2, 5–12
Quattro Plant JG Speedfit Kawasaki	Kawasaki	80	(Spain) Héctor Barberá	3–4, 6–12
Tyco BMW	BMW	2	(Northern Ireland) Glenn Irwin	7–10
Tyco BMW	BMW	21	(England) Christian Iddon	All
Tyco BMW	BMW	33	(Northern Ireland) Keith Farmer	1–5
Tyco BMW	BMW	70	(Northern Ireland) Michael Laverty	6
Tyco BMW	BMW	99	(Scotland) Taylor Mackenzie	11–12
OMG Racing Suzuki	Suzuki	3	(Australia) Billy McConnell	8–9
OMG Racing Suzuki	Suzuki	3	(Australia) Billy McConnell	11–12
OMG Racing Suzuki	Suzuki	10	(Northern Ireland) Josh Elliott	1–8
OMG Racing Suzuki	Suzuki	12	(England) Luke Mossey	1–7, 9–12
OMG Racing Suzuki	Suzuki	77	(England) James Ellison	10–12
Santander Salt TAG Yamaha	Yamaha	4	(England) Dan Linfoot	All
Santander Salt TAG Yamaha	Yamaha	8	(England) Shaun Winfield	All
Silicone Engineering Racing	Kawasaki	5	(England) Dean Harrison	1–2, 5–6, 8, 11–12
Honda Racing	Honda	6	(Spain) Xavi Forés	All
Honda Racing	Honda	18	(Northern Ireland) Andrew Irwin	All
RAF Regular & Reserves Kawasaki	Kawasaki	7	(England) Ryan Vickers	1–4, 6–12
Milenco by Padgett's Motorcycles	Honda	11	(Isle of Man) Conor Cummins	1
Brixx Ducati	Ducati	20	(France) Sylvain Barrier	1–4
McAMS Yamaha	Yamaha	22	(Australia) Jason O'Halloran	All
McAMS Yamaha	Yamaha	95	(Scotland) Tarran Mackenzie	All
EHA Racing	Yamaha	23	(Northern Ireland) David Allingham	1–9, 11
Be Wiser Ducati Racing Team	Ducati	25	(Australia) Josh Brookes	All
Be Wiser Ducati Racing Team	Ducati	45	(England) Scott Redding	All
Buildbase Suzuki	Suzuki	28	(England) Bradley Ray	All
Buildbase Suzuki	Suzuki	47	(England) Richard Cooper	10
Buildbase Suzuki	Suzuki	81	(England) Luke Stapleford	All
Lloyd & Jones PR Racing	BMW	40	(England) Joe Francis	All
Bike Devil Sweda MV Agusta	MV Agusta	44	(England) Gino Rea	8, 11–12
Bike Devil Sweda MV Agusta	MV Agusta	52	(England) Danny Kent	6–7
Bike Devil Sweda MV Agusta	MV Agusta	77	(England) James Ellison	9
Oxford Racing Ducati	Ducati	46	(England) Tommy Bridewell	All
NP Motorcycles	BMW	48	(England) Ashley Beech	11
Raceways Yamaha	Yamaha	59	(England) Matt Truelove	All
Smiths Racing	BMW	60	(England) Peter Hickman	All
Smiths Racing	BMW	75	(England) Alex Olsen	9–12
Smiths Racing	BMW	77	(England) James Ellison	1–7
CDH Racing	Kawasaki	65	(England) Josh Owens	9–12
CDH Racing	Kawasaki	74	(England) Dean Hipwell	1–8
Team WD-40	Kawasaki	71	(Italy) Claudio Corti	All
FS-3 Racing	Kawasaki	83	(England) Danny Buchan	All
Gearlink Kawasaki	Kawasaki	89	(England) Fraser Rogers	1–2, 5–8
Team 64	Kawasaki	90	(England) Sam Coventry	All

Key
Regular rider
Wildcard rider
Replacement rider

- All entries used Pirelli tyres.

== Race calendar and results ==
2019 calendar
Main Season
Round		Circuit	Date	Pole position	Fastest lap	Winning rider	Winning team
1	R1	(England) Silverstone National	21 April	(Scotland) Tarran Mackenzie	(Scotland) Tarran Mackenzie	(Northern Ireland) Josh Elliott	OMG Racing UK LTD
1	R2	(England) Silverstone National	21 April		(England) Danny Buchan	(Scotland) Tarran Mackenzie	McAMS Yamaha
2	R1	(England) Oulton Park International	6 May	(Australia) Josh Brookes	(England) Tommy Bridewell	(Australia) Josh Brookes	Be Wiser Ducati Racing Team
2	R2	(England) Oulton Park International	6 May		(Australia) Josh Brookes	(Australia) Josh Brookes	Be Wiser Ducati Racing Team
3	R1	(England) Donington Park National	25 May	(Australia) Josh Brookes	(England) Tommy Bridewell	(England) Scott Redding	Be Wiser Ducati Racing Team
3	R2	(England) Donington Park National	26 May		(Spain) Héctor Barberá	(England) Scott Redding	Be Wiser Ducati Racing Team
3	R3	(England) Donington Park National	26 May		(Australia) Jason O'Halloran	(England) Scott Redding	Be Wiser Ducati Racing Team
4	R1	(England) Brands Hatch GP	16 June	(England) Scott Redding	(England) Scott Redding	(Australia) Josh Brookes	Be Wiser Ducati Racing Team
4	R2	(England) Brands Hatch GP	16 June		(England) Tommy Bridewell	(Australia) Josh Brookes	Be Wiser Ducati Racing Team
5	R1	(Scotland) Knockhill	30 June	(Spain) Xavi Forés	(England) Scott Redding	(England) Danny Buchan	FS-3 Racing
5	R2	(Scotland) Knockhill	30 June		(England) Danny Buchan	(England) Scott Redding	Be Wiser Ducati Racing Team
6	R1	(England) Snetterton 300	21 July	(England) Scott Redding	(England) Tommy Bridewell	(England) Scott Redding	Be Wiser Ducati Racing Team
6	R2	(England) Snetterton 300	21 July		(England) Scott Redding	(England) Scott Redding	Be Wiser Ducati Racing Team
7	R1	(England) Thruxton	4 August	(England) Scott Redding	(Northern Ireland) Andrew Irwin	(Northern Ireland) Andrew Irwin	Honda Racing
7	R2	(England) Thruxton	4 August		(Australia) Josh Brookes	(Australia) Josh Brookes	Be Wiser Ducati Racing Team
8	R1	(England) Cadwell Park	18 August	(Australia) Josh Brookes	(England) Tommy Bridewell	(England) Danny Buchan	FS-3 Racing
8	R2	(England) Cadwell Park	18 August		(England) Tommy Bridewell	(Australia) Josh Brookes	Be Wiser Ducati Racing Team
9	R1	(England) Oulton Park International	7 September	(Australia) Josh Brookes	(Australia) Josh Brookes	(Australia) Josh Brookes	Be Wiser Ducati Racing Team
9	R2	(England) Oulton Park International	8 September		(England) Bradley Ray	(England) Scott Redding	Be Wiser Ducati Racing Team
9	R3	(England) Oulton Park International	8 September		(England) Tommy Bridewell	(England) Tommy Bridewell	Oxford Racing Ducati
The Showdown
10	R1	(Netherlands) TT Circuit Assen	22 September	(England) Scott Redding	(England) Tommy Bridewell	(England) Scott Redding	Be Wiser Ducati Racing Team
10	R2	(Netherlands) TT Circuit Assen	22 September		(England) Scott Redding	(England) Scott Redding	Be Wiser Ducati Racing Team
11	R1	(England) Donington Park GP	6 October	(England) Scott Redding	(England) Scott Redding	(England) Scott Redding	Be Wiser Ducati Racing Team
11	R2	(England) Donington Park GP	6 October		(Australia) Josh Brookes	(England) Scott Redding	Be Wiser Ducati Racing Team
12	R1	(England) Brands Hatch GP	19 October	(Australia) Josh Brookes	(Australia) Josh Brookes	(Australia) Josh Brookes	Be Wiser Ducati Racing Team
12	R2	(England) Brands Hatch GP	20 October		(England) Tommy Bridewell	(Australia) Josh Brookes	Be Wiser Ducati Racing Team
12	R3	(England) Brands Hatch GP	20 October		(England) Scott Redding	(Australia) Josh Brookes	Be Wiser Ducati Racing Team

== Championship standings ==
=== Riders' championship ===
Scoring system

Points are awarded to the top fifteen finishers. A rider has to finish the race to earn points.

Position	**1st**	**2nd**	**3rd**	**4th**	**5th**	**6th**	**7th**	**8th**	**9th**	**10th**	**11th**	**12th**	**13th**	**14th**	**15th**
Points	25	20	16	13	11	10	9	8	7	6	5	4	3	2	1

Pos	Rider	Bike	SIL (England)		OUL (England)		DON (England)			BRH (England)		KNO (Scotland)		SNE (England)		THR (England)		CAD (England)		OUL (England)			ASS (Netherlands)		DON (England)		BRH (England)			Pts
Pos	Rider	Bike	R1	R2	R1	R2	R1	R2	R3	R1	R2	R1	R2	R1	R2	R1	R2	R1	R2	R1	R2	R3	R1	R2	R1	R2	R1	R2	R3	Pts
The Championship Showdown
1	(England) Scott Redding	Ducati	3	Ret	5	4	1	1	1	**22**	**3**	2	**1**	**1**	1	**2**	22	4	Ret	3	1	3	**1**	1	**1**	**1**	3	2	3	697
2	(Australia) Josh Brookes	Ducati	Ret	Ret	**1**	1	**Ret**	4	5	1	1	8	4	2	2	3	1	**2**	1	**1**	**2**	Ret	2	4	3	2	**1**	**1**	1	692
3	(England) Tommy Bridewell	Ducati	5	4	2	**2**	4	**3**	3	3	2	5	3	Ret	**3**	8	5	3	**2**	Ret	3	1	Ret	**2**	2	3	2	3	**2**	636
4	(England) Danny Buchan	Kawasaki	4	3	3	3	13	11	11	4	4	1	Ret	4	Ret	6	8	1	3	4	5	4	6	3	10	4	5	6	8	588
5	(Scotland) Tarran Mackenzie	Yamaha	**2**	**1**	8	5	2	5	4	DNS	DNS	Ret	2	3	Ret	DNS	DNS	13	12	8	9	7	7	13	12	9	11	4	6	566
6	(England) Peter Hickman	BMW	14	14	6	11	10	9	7	5	7	11	6	7	5	5	3	5	5	DNS	8	8	8	8	4	Ret	7	8	5	558
BSB Riders Cup
7	(England) Christian Iddon	BMW	11	17	Ret	6	7	6	6	7	6	4	Ret	10	6	17	6	6	4	5	7	Ret	Ret	Ret	6	5	4	5	4	203
8	(Northern Ireland) Andrew Irwin	Honda	6	7	11	9	11	12	8	9	12	Ret	5	5	4	1	**2**	9	Ret	DNS	EX	10	11	12	5	7	9	9	9	202
9	(Spain) Xavi Forés	Honda	10	7	16	17	3	2	2	14	13	**3**	11	6	8	7	7	14	9	16	11	14	5	6	7	8	8	11	Ret	199
10	(Australia) Jason O'Halloran	Yamaha	Ret	Ret	4	7	5	7	Ret	8	9	Ret	Ret	9	Ret	4	4	7	14	6	6	6	3	7	11	10	6	7	7	195
11	(England) Bradley Ray	Suzuki	16	10	14	12	17	13	9	17	Ret	6	Ret	13	13	12	13	Ret	Ret	2	4	**2**	9	10	Ret	6	15	14	14	126
12	(England) Luke Mossey	Suzuki	4	6	Ret	14	Ret	14	12	11	11	7	8	8	10	9	9			12	10	11	12	Ret	9	11	DNS	15	12	122
13	(England) Luke Stapleford	Suzuki	7	5	19	16	12	15	10	13	17	9	Ret	Ret	15	14	12	11	8	14	12	12	4	5	13	14	14	16	17	102
14	(England) Dan Linfoot	Yamaha	13	9	13	13	Ret	Ret	Ret	2	5	13	7	14	11	15	10	Ret	15	DNS	Ret	16	Ret	9	Ret	19	12	12	10	95
15	(Northern Ireland) Glenn Irwin	Kawasaki	Ret	11	Ret	22	9	Ret	14	10	10	10	9																	84
15	(Northern Ireland) Glenn Irwin	BMW														11	DNS	8	6	7	15	5	Ret	15						84
16	(England) Ryan Vickers	Kawasaki	12	15	9	10	DNS	DNS	DNS	DNS	DNS			Ret	12	12	DNS	10	7	10	Ret	9	Ret	Ret	8	12	DNS	Ret	Ret	68
17	(Northern Ireland) Josh Elliott	Suzuki	1	2	10	15	18	Ret	16	15	15	15	14	Ret	Ret	18	15	20	16											58
18	(Northern Ireland) Keith Farmer	BMW	15	12	7	8	8	10	Ret	6	8	DNS	DNS																	54
19	(Spain) Héctor Barberá	Kawasaki					6	8	**Ret**	24	20			12	7	20	16	16	11	DNS	Ret	DNS	10	11	17	17	20	19	16	47
20	(Italy) Claudio Corti	Kawasaki	8	Ret	18	21	14	18	13	16	16	Ret	12	15	14	13	14	DNS	DNS	17	14	13	17	14	15	15	19	20	15	35
21	(England) James Ellison	BMW	Ret	Ret	23	Ret	15	16	15	12	14	12	10	Ret	17	16	11													28
21	(England) James Ellison	MV Agusta																		13	Ret	DNS								28
21	(England) James Ellison	Suzuki																					14	Ret	Ret	20	DNS	17	Ret	28
22	(England) Alex Olsen	BMW																		9	16	Ret	16	16	16	13	13	13	13	19
23	(Scotland) Taylor Mackenzie	BMW																							DNS	DNS	10	10	11	17
24	(Northern Ireland) Michael Laverty	BMW												11	9															12
25	(Australia) Ben Currie	Kawasaki	Ret	13	DNS	DNS						Ret	Ret	Ret	DNS	Ret	20	21	19	11	Ret	17	15	17	19	18	16	Ret	Ret	9
26	(England) Dean Harrison	Kawasaki	Ret	Ret	12	18						17	Ret	18	18			15	13						22	22	18	18	Ret	8
27	(England) Joe Francis	BMW	21	20	Ret	23	16	19	17	Ret	21	Ret	Ret	16	Ret	DNS	DNS	22	Ret	15	13	15	Ret	Ret	14	16	DNS	Ret	Ret	7
28	(Australia) Billy McConnell	Suzuki																18	10	DNS	DNS	DNS			18	Ret	21	22	18	6
29	(Northern Ireland) David Allingham	Yamaha	Ret	19	15	19	19	17	18	DNS	DNS	14	13	Ret	19	23	19	23	18	DNS	Ret	Ret			23	23				6
30	(England) Gino Rea	MV Agusta																12	Ret						20	26	DNS	Ret	19	4
31	(England) Richard Cooper	Suzuki																					13	Ret						3
32	(England) Sam Coventry	Kawasaki	22	21	22	25	DNS	DNS	Ret	19	22	Ret	15	Ret	DNS	21	17	19	17	Ret	17	18	19	Ret	Ret	24	Ret	Ret	21	1
	(France) Sylvain Barrier	Ducati	17	16	17	19	21	20	Ret	21	19																			0
	(England) Matt Truelove	Yamaha	18	18	Ret	24	20	Ret	Ret	18	18	16	Ret	17	16	Ret	Ret	17	20	DNS	DNS	DNS	18	18	21	21	17	21	20	0
	(England) Shaun Winfield	Yamaha	Ret	Ret	21	Ret	22	21	Ret	23	23	Ret	16	21	22	24	21	24	21	DNS	18	19	Ret	19	24	25	DNS	Ret	22	0
	(England) Dean Hipwell	Kawasaki	19	22	Ret	Ret	Ret	Ret	19	20	24	Ret	17	20	21	22	DNS	Ret	DNS											0
	(England) Danny Kent	MV Agusta												Ret	DNS	Ret	18													0
	(England) James Hillier	Kawasaki	23	23	20	26																								0
	(England) Fraser Rogers	Kawasaki	20	Ret	DNS	DNS						DNS	DNS	22	Ret	19	DNS	Ret	DNS											0
	(Isle of Man) Conor Cummins	Honda	24	Ret																										0
	(England) Josh Owens	Kawasaki																		Ret	Ret	DNS	Ret	Ret	Ret	Ret	22	23	Ret	0
	(England) Ashley Beech	BMW																							Ret	Ret				0
Pos	Rider	Bike	SIL (England)		OUL (England)		DON (England)			BRH (England)		KNO (Scotland)		SNE (England)		THR (England)		CAD (England)		OUL (England)			ASS (Netherlands)		DON (England)		BRH (England)			Pts

Colour	Result
Gold	Winner
Silver	Second place
Bronze	Third place
Green	Points classification
Blue	Non-points classification
Blue	Non-classified finish (NC)
Purple	Retired, not classified (Ret)
Red	Did not qualify (DNQ)
Red	Did not pre-qualify (DNPQ)
Black	Disqualified (DSQ)
White	Did not start (DNS)
White	Withdrew (WD)
White	Race cancelled (C)
Blank	Did not practice (DNP)
Blank	Did not arrive (DNA)
Blank	Excluded (EX)

**Bold** – Pole position
Italics – Fastest lap
