= 2023 British Superbike Championship =

36th British motorcycle Championship

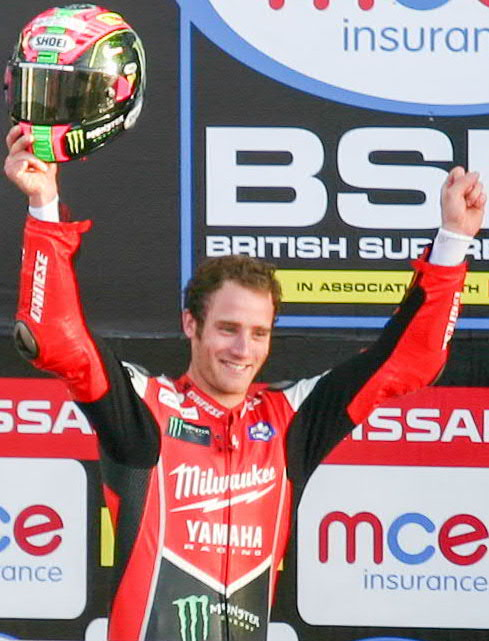
2023 champion, Tommy Bridewell

The 2023 British Superbike Championship season is the 36th season of the motorcycle championship. Bradley Ray was the reigning champion, but chose to compete in the 2023 Superbike World Championship. The championship was won by Tommy Bridewell, winning the closest-ever BSB season, defeating teammate Glenn Irwin by just half a point on a BeerMonster Ducati Panigale V4.

== Teams and riders ==
2023 Entry List
Team	Constructor	No.	Rider	Rounds
IN Competition	Aprilia	89	(England) Fraser Rogers	11
Tactix by Lloyd and Jones BMW	BMW	12	(England) Luke Mossey	All
FHO Racing BMW	BMW	25	(Australia) Josh Brookes	All
FHO Racing BMW	BMW	60	(England) Peter Hickman	All
SYNETIQ BMW Motorrad	BMW	83	(England) Danny Buchan	1, 3–8
SYNETIQ BMW Motorrad	BMW	74	(England) Davey Todd	9
ROKiT BMW Motorrad Team	BMW	91	(England) Leon Haslam	All
Roadhouse Macau Racing/FHO BMW	BMW	11	(Republic of Ireland) Brian McCormack	2
Milwaukee BMW Motorrad	BMW	74	(England) Davey Todd	10–11
BeerMonster Ducati	Ducati	2	(Northern Ireland) Glenn Irwin	All
BeerMonster Ducati	Ducati	46	(England) Tommy Bridewell	All
Oxford Products Racing	Ducati	21	(England) Christian Iddon	All
TAG Racing Honda	Honda	4	(England) Shaun Winfield	11
TAG Racing Honda	Honda	8	(Spain) Héctor Barberá	1–5, 7–10
TAG Racing Honda	Honda	15	(England) Tom Booth-Amos	11
TAG Racing Honda	Honda	34	(England) Liam Delves	6
TAG Racing Honda	Honda	59	(England) Matt Truelove	7
Honda Racing UK	Honda	18	(Northern Ireland) Andrew Irwin	1–3, 10–11
Honda Racing UK	Honda	54	(England) Franco Bourne	5–9
Honda Racing UK	Honda	68	(England) Tom Neave	All
Lovell Kent Racing Honda	Honda	52	(England) Danny Kent	1–7
Crendon Honda by Hawk Racing	Honda	65	(England) Josh Owens	1–7
Crendon Honda by Hawk Racing	Honda	6	(Northern Ireland) Michael Dunlop	9–10
MasterMac by Hawk Racing Honda	Honda	86	(England) Charlie Nesbitt	All
Milenco by Padgett's Motorcycles Honda	Honda	74	(England) Davey Todd	1–3
Hawk Racing	Honda	6	(Northern Ireland) Michael Dunlop	2
Marvel HCL Motorsport	Honda	54	(England) Franco Bourne	10–11
Cumins by Team IWR Honda	Honda	75	(England) Alex Olsen	10–11
DAO Racing Kawasaki	Kawasaki	5	(England) Dean Harrison	1–7
DAO Racing Kawasaki	Kawasaki	51	(Australia) Brayden Elliott	9–11
DAO Racing Kawasaki	Kawasaki	81	(England) Luke Stapleford	8
Cheshire Mouldings Kawasaki	Kawasaki	14	(England) Lee Jackson	All
Cheshire Mouldings Kawasaki	Kawasaki	30	(England) Max Cook	All
NP Motorcycles Kawasaki	Kawasaki	16	(England) Luke Hopkins	1
Starline Racing Kawasaki	Kawasaki	79	(England) Storm Stacey	All
Lee Hardy Racing Kawasaki	Kawasaki	97	(England) Bradley Perie	All
Rapid CDH Racing Kawasaki	Kawasaki	34	(England) Liam Delves	1–5
Rapid CDH Racing Kawasaki	Kawasaki	55	(England) Jack Scott	All
Rapid CDH Racing Kawasaki	Kawasaki	56	(England) Louis Valleley	7–11
LAMI OMG Racing Yamaha	Yamaha	7	(England) Ryan Vickers	1, 3–11
LAMI OMG Racing Yamaha	Yamaha	7	(England) Luke Stapleford	2
LAMI OMG Racing Yamaha	Yamaha	77	(England) Kyle Ryde	1–11
McAMS Yamaha	Yamaha	22	(Australia) Jason O'Halloran	All
McAMS Yamaha	Yamaha	53	(Spain) Tito Rabat	5–7
McAMS Yamaha	Yamaha	54	(England) Tim Neave	1–3
McAMS Yamaha	Yamaha	59	(Italy) Niccolò Canepa	10–11
McAMS Yamaha	Yamaha	81	(England) Luke Stapleford	9
Mar-Train Racing Yamaha	Yamaha	4	(Republic of Ireland) Jack Kennedy	All

== Race calendar and results ==
2023 calendar
Main Season
Round		Circuit	Date	Pole position	Fastest lap	Winning rider	Winning team
1	R1	(England) Silverstone National	8 April	Tommy Bridewell	Kyle Ryde	Kyle Ryde	LAMI OMG Racing Yamaha
1	R2	(England) Silverstone National	9 April		Jason O'Halloran	Josh Brookes	FHO Racing BMW Motorrad
1	R3	(England) Silverstone National	9 April		Glenn Irwin	Glenn Irwin	BeerMonster Ducati
2	R1	(England) Oulton Park	30 April	Josh Brookes	Tommy Bridewell	Josh Brookes	FHO Racing BMW Motorrad
2	R2	(England) Oulton Park	1 May		Leon Haslam	Tommy Bridewell	BeerMonster Ducati
2	R3	(England) Oulton Park	1 May		Tommy Bridewell	Glenn Irwin	BeerMonster Ducati
3	R1	(England) Donington Park GP	20 May	Kyle Ryde	Leon Haslam	Kyle Ryde	LAMI OMG Racing Yamaha
3	R2	(England) Donington Park GP	21 May		Tommy Bridewell	Jason O'Halloran	McAMS Yamaha
3	R3	(England) Donington Park GP	21 May		Glenn Irwin	Kyle Ryde	LAMI OMG Racing Yamaha
4	R1	(Scotland) Knockhill	17 June	Glenn Irwin	Jason O'Halloran	Glenn Irwin	BeerMonster Ducati
4	R2	(Scotland) Knockhill	18 June		Christian Iddon	Kyle Ryde	LAMI OMG Racing Yamaha
4	R3	(Scotland) Knockhill	18 June		Glenn Irwin	Glenn Irwin	BeerMonster Ducati
5	R1	(England) Snetterton 300	8 July	Jason O'Halloran	Tommy Bridewell	Tommy Bridewell	BeerMonster Ducati
5	R2	(England) Snetterton 300	9 July		Tommy Bridewell	Tommy Bridewell	BeerMonster Ducati
5	R3	(England) Snetterton 300	9 July		Tommy Bridewell; Ryan Vickers	Tommy Bridewell	BeerMonster Ducati
6	R1	(England) Brands Hatch GP	22 July	Tommy Bridewell	Christian Iddon	Ryan Vickers	LAMI OMG Racing Yamaha
6	R2	(England) Brands Hatch GP	23 July		Tommy Bridewell	Tommy Bridewell	BeerMonster Ducati
6	R3	(England) Brands Hatch GP	23 July		Ryan Vickers	Tommy Bridewell	BeerMonster Ducati
7	R1	(England) Thruxton	12 August	Jason O'Halloran	Charlie Nesbitt	Jason O'Halloran	McAMS Yamaha
7	R2	(England) Thruxton	13 August		Ryan Vickers	Jason O'Halloran	McAMS Yamaha
7	R3	(England) Thruxton	13 August		Charlie Nesbitt	Jason O'Halloran	McAMS Yamaha
8	R1	(England) Cadwell Park	27 August	Ryan Vickers	Leon Haslam	Glenn Irwin	BeerMonster Ducati
8	R2	(England) Cadwell Park	28 August		Leon Haslam	Glenn Irwin	BeerMonster Ducati
8	R3	(England) Cadwell Park	28 August		Tommy Bridewell	Tommy Bridewell	BeerMonster Ducati
The Showdown
9	R1	(England) Oulton Park	16 September	Tommy Bridewell	Tommy Bridewell	Glenn Irwin	BeerMonster Ducati
9	R2	(England) Oulton Park	17 September		Tommy Bridewell	Glenn Irwin	BeerMonster Ducati
9	R3	(England) Oulton Park	17 September		Tommy Bridewell	Tommy Bridewell	BeerMonster Ducati
10	R1	(England) Donington Park National	30 September	Jason O'Halloran	Leon Haslam	Ryan Vickers	LAMI OMG Racing Yamaha
10	R2	(England) Donington Park National	1 October		Tommy Bridewell	Kyle Ryde	LAMI OMG Racing Yamaha
10	R3	(England) Donington Park National	1 October		Jason O'Halloran	Jason O'Halloran	McAMS Yamaha
11	R1	(England) Brands Hatch GP	14 October	Jason O'Halloran	Jason O'Halloran	Kyle Ryde	LAMI OMG Racing Yamaha
11	R2	(England) Brands Hatch GP	15 October		Tommy Bridewell	Glenn Irwin	BeerMonster Ducati
11	R3	(England) Brands Hatch GP	15 October		Tommy Bridewell	Glenn Irwin	BeerMonster Ducati

== Championship standings ==
=== Riders' championship ===
Scoring system in the Main season

Points are awarded to the top fifteen finishers. A rider has to finish the race to earn points.

Position	1st	2nd	3rd	4th	5th	6th	7th	8th	9th	10th	11th	12th	13th	14th	15th
Points	18	16	14	12	11	10	9	8	7	6	5	4	3	2	1

Scoring system in the first two rounds in the showdown

Points are awarded to the top fifteen finishers. A rider has to finish the race to earn points.

Position	1st	2nd	3rd	4th	5th	6th	7th	8th	9th	10th	11th	12th	13th	14th	15th
Points	25	22	20	18	16	14	12	10	8	6	5	4	3	2	1

Scoring system in the season finale

Points are awarded to the top fifteen finishers. A rider has to finish the race to earn points.

Position	1st	2nd	3rd	4th	5th	6th	7th	8th	9th	10th	11th	12th	13th	14th	15th
Points	35	30	27	24	22	20	18	16	14	12	10	8	6	4	2

Pos	Rider	Bike	SIL (England)			OUL (England)			DON (England)			KNO (Scotland)			SNE (England)			BRH (England)			THR (England)			CAD (England)			OUL (England)			DON (England)			BRH (England)			Pts
Pos	Rider	Bike	R1	R2	R3	R1	R2	R3	R1	R2	R3	R1	R2	R3	R1	R2	R3	R1	R2	R3	R1	R2	R3	R1	R2	R3	R1	R2	R3	R1	R2	R3	R1	R2	R3	Pts
1	(England) Tommy Bridewell	Ducati	2	2	3	5	1	4	2	Ret	2	4	2	2	1	1	1	6	1	1	14	14	15	5	5	1	4	6	1	24	Ret	9	3	2	2	455
2	(Northern Ireland) Glenn Irwin	Ducati	5	3	1	3	2	1	5	Ret	3	1	Ret	1	4	4	2	9	4	2	9	13	13	1	1	2	1	1	2	23	Ret	Ret	4	1	1	454.5
3	(England) Kyle Ryde	Yamaha	1	4	7	7	5	3	1	Ret	1	2	1	4	13	11	8	14	7	Ret	8	6	7	2	2	4	6	3	6	12	1	12	1	3	3	422
4	(England) Lee Jackson	Kawasaki	14	10	9	10	8	8	4	5	6	10	6	5	7	7	7	13	8	7	5	2	2	6	6	5	2	2	3	5	4	8	9	5	8	376.5
5	(England) Leon Haslam	BMW	6	6	6	2	3	2	3	4	8	6	10	6	Ret	3	3	Ret	Ret	8	6	7	6	Ret	4	3	3	4	4	2	2	Ret	Ret	6	5	369
6	(Australia) Jason O'Halloran	Yamaha	4	5	4	Ret	Ret	10	14	1	7	3	3	Ret	3	5	6	5	6	6	1	1	1	4	3	6	8	8	9	17	5	1	2	Ret	7	365.5
7	(Australia) Josh Brookes	BMW	3	1	2	1	6	5	6	3	13	9	9	8	2	2	Ret	12	9	Ret	15	17	22	8	8	8	5	5	5	7	8	3	7	8	9	340
8	(England) Ryan Vickers	Yamaha	13	12	10				7	2	4	7	4	3	Ret	9	4	1	5	3	3	4	5	3	Ret	WD	DSQ	9	8	1	6	Ret	10	4	4	306
9	(England) Christian Iddon	Ducati	25	Ret	11	8	7	7	Ret	9	5	5	5	9	5	8	5	3	2	4	13	9	10	7	7	7	7	7	7	16	3	2	5	Ret	6	306
10	(Republic of Ireland) Jack Kennedy	Yamaha	7	7	8	12	9	13	Ret	10	12	11	13	13	8	10	12	4	10	13	11	5	Ret	10	Ret	WD	Ret	Ret	Ret	4	11	5	8	14	Ret	175
11	(England) Charlie Nesbitt	Honda	12	Ret	17	11	Ret	14	10	6	9	Ret	Ret	Ret	9	12	11	11	11	9	2	3	3	Ret	Ret	Ret	10	12	12	20	7	4	Ret	11	10	174.5
12	(England) Peter Hickman	BMW	11	Ret	12	4	Ret	6	13	7	11	16	Ret	12	20	DNS	Ret	8	12	Ret	10	8	9	9	Ret	10	9	10	11	9	10	7	6	9	Ret	173
13	(England) Storm Stacey	Kawasaki	18	19	21	9	Ret	11	9	11	Ret	8	7	Ret	16	16	Ret	7	13	11	16	11	8	Ret	9	9	Ret	Ret	10	8	Ret	6	11	10	12	140.5
14	(England) Danny Kent	Honda	9	8	5	15	11	Ret	8	Ret	Ret	17	Ret	DNS	6	6	9	2	3	5	7	10	Ret													115
15	(England) Max Cook	Kawasaki	20	21	20	20	14	17	11	12	Ret	18	Ret	14	11	14	13	10	14	10	4	Ret	4	WD	WD	WD	11	13	13	13	9	18	13	7	11	114
16	(England) Tom Neave	Honda	Ret	11	14	14	12	Ret	Ret	8	14	15	8	7	12	DNS	15	23	Ret	14	18	15	16	11	10	Ret	14	Ret	DNS	11	13	15	14	12	13	89
17	(England) Luke Mossey	BMW	21	14	Ret	13	13	19	19	Ret	Ret	14	14	11	14	19	Ret	18	Ret	Ret	12	16	12	15	13	Ret	Ret	15	Ret	3	Ret	11	12	15	Ret	67
18	(Northern Ireland) Andrew Irwin	Honda	8	9	Ret	6	4	9	Ret	Ret	Ret																			Ret	Ret	Ret	16	13	17	50
19	(England) Bradley Perie	Kawasaki	19	17	18	22	17	16	17	15	17	Ret	DNS	DNS	Ret	17	Ret	19	15	19	17	12	11	12	11	11	13	11	14	15	Ret	19	15	17	14	42
20	(England) Franco Bourne	Honda													19	Ret	Ret	20	Ret	16	19	18	14	13	12	12	15	Ret	Ret	6	DNS	14	Ret	18	Ret	30
21	(England) Dean Harrison	Kawasaki	15	20	19	17	10	12	Ret	DNS	DNS	12	12	10	15	Ret	16	16	Ret	17	22	Ret	20													26
22	(England) Danny Buchan	BMW	10	Ret	DNS				12	Ret	10	DNS	11	Ret	Ret	DNS	DNS	DNS	Ret	12	Ret	21	19	WD	WD	WD										25
23	(Spain) Tito Rabat	Yamaha													10	13	10	21	Ret	15	Ret	19	Ret													16
24	(England) Davey Todd	Honda and BMW	22	16	22	24	15	15	20	DNS	DNS																12	16	15	18	14	10	19	Ret	16	15
25	(England) Jack Scott	Kawasaki	23	Ret	DNS	23	21	22	18	Ret	18	19	15	Ret	17	18	Ret	17	Ret	18	20	20	18	14	14	13	16	17	17	14	16	16	18	Ret	18	10
26	(England) Josh Owens	Honda	24	15	16	16	Ret	DNS	Ret	14	DSQ	13	Ret	Ret	18	15	14	15	Ret	Ret	WD	WD	WD													9.5
27	(Italy) Niccolò Canepa	Yamaha																												Ret	12	13	Ret	16	15	9
28	(Spain) Héctor Barberá	Honda	Ret	18	15	21	20	21	15	13	15	Ret	16	15	21	Ret	17				23	22	17	17	15	15	17	18	18	WD	WD	WD				9
29	(England) Louis Valleley	Kawasaki																			21	23	21	18	Ret	Ret	Ret	20	Ret	10	Ret	20	Ret	Ret	23	6
30	(England) Tim Neave	Yamaha	16	13	13	18	19	18	16	Ret	16																									6
31	(England) Luke Stapleford	Yamaha and Kawasaki				19	16	20																16	Ret	14	Ret	14	16							4
32	(England) Alex Olsen	Honda																												22	15	Ret	Ret	19	20	1
	(England) Liam Delves	Kawasaki and Honda	17	Ret	DNS	Ret	18	Ret	21	16	19	20	Ret	Ret	22	DNS	Ret	22	16	20																0
	(Australia) Brayden Elliott	Kawasaki																									18	19	Ret	19	17	17	21	20	21	0
	(England) Fraser Rogers	Aprilia																															17	Ret	19	0
	(Northern Ireland) Michael Dunlop	Honda				Ret	Ret	DNS																			19	Ret	Ret	21	Ret	Ret				0
	(England) Tom Booth-Amos	Honda																															20	Ret	22	0
	(England) Shaun Winfield	Honda																															22	Ret	Ret	0
	(Republic of Ireland) Brian McCormack	BMW				25	Ret	DNS																												0
	(England) Luke Hopkins	Kawasaki	DNQ	DNQ	DNQ																															0
	(England) Matt Truelove	Honda																			DNP	DNP	DNP													0
Pos	Rider	Bike	SIL (England)			OUL (England)			DON (England)			KNO (Scotland)			SNE (England)			BRH (England)			THR (England)			CAD (England)			OUL (England)			DON (England)			BRH (England)			Pts

=== Manufacturers standings ===
Each manufacturer is awarded the same number of points as their best placed rider in each race.

Pos.	Constructor	SIL (England)			OUL (England)			DON (England)			KNO (Scotland)			SNE (England)			BRH (England)			THR (England)			CAD (England)			OUL (England)			DON (England)			BRH (England)			Pts
Pos.	Constructor	R1	R2	R3	R1	R2	R3	R1	R2	R3	R1	R2	R3	R1	R2	R3	R1	R2	R3	R1	R2	R3	R1	R2	R3	R1	R2	R3	R1	R2	R3	R1	R2	R3	Pts
1	(Italy) Ducati	2	2	1	3	1	1	2	9	2	1	2	1	1	1	1	3	1	1	9	9	10	1	1	1	1	1	1	16	3	2	3	1	1	576
2	(Japan) Yamaha	1	4	4	7	5	3	1	1	1	2	1	3	3	5	4	1	5	3	1	1	1	2	2	4	6	3	6	1	1	1	1	3	3	559
3	(Germany) BMW	3	1	2	1	3	2	3	3	8	6	9	6	2	2	3	8	9	8	6	7	6	8	4	3	3	4	4	2	2	3	6	6	5	469
4	(Japan) Kawasaki	14	10	9	9	8	8	4	5	6	8	6	5	7	7	7	7	8	7	4	2	2	6	6	5	2	2	3	5	4	6	9	5	8	387.5
5	(Japan) Honda	8	8	5	6	4	9	8	6	9	13	8	7	6	6	9	2	3	5	2	3	3	11	10	12	10	12	12	6	7	4	14	11	10	304
Pos.	Constructor	SIL (England)			OUL (England)			DON (England)			KNO (Scotland)			SNE (England)			BRH (England)			THR (England)			CAD (England)			OUL (England)			DON (England)			BRH (England)			Pts
Source:																																			Pts
