= Ryan Vickers =

British motorcycle racer

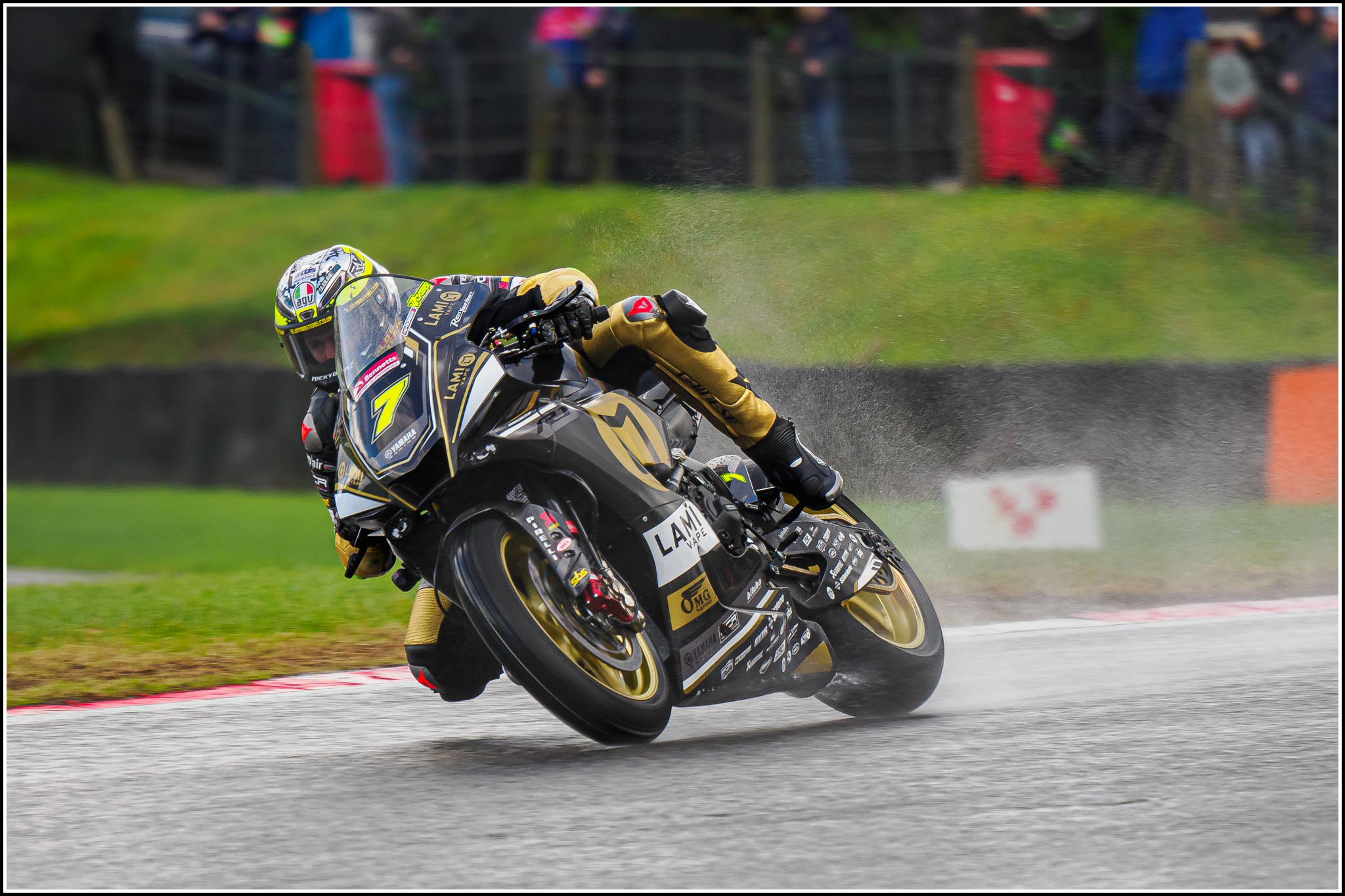
- Vickers riding for OMG Racing at Brands Hatch in the British Superbike Championship
- Nationality: British
- Born: 19 February 1999 (age 27); Thetford, England
- Current team: Honda Racing UK
- Bike number: 7
- Website: Ryan Vickers Racing
Motorcycle racing career statistics
Superbike World Championship
Active years	2022, 2025–2026
Manufacturers	Kawasaki (2022); Ducati (2025); Honda (2026)
2026 championship position	27th (1 pts)
Starts / Wins / Podiums / Poles / F. laps / Points; 44 / 0 / 0 / 0 / 0 / 46
British Superbike Championship
Active years	2019–2024, 2026–
Manufacturers	Kawasaki (2019–2021); BMW (2022); Yamaha (2023–2024); Honda (2026–)
2024 championship position	5th (349 pts)
Starts / Wins / Podiums / Poles / F. laps / Points; 186 / 14 / 30 / 10 / 10 / 1448

Ryan James Vickers (born 19 February 1999) is an English motorcycle racer for Honda Racing UK in the 2026 British Superbike Championship, after previously competing in the series from 2019 to 2024. For 2025, he competed for Motocorsa Racing in the 2025 Superbike World Championship ending the season in 20th place.

== Career ==
=== Early career ===
Vickers became interested in motorsports when his dad finished fourth in the world wheelie competition. Vickers initially took up motocross, starting his first race at seven years old. He then transitioned to circuit racing. He competed at club level before entering the national championships.

In 2017, Vickers made his debut in the Pirelli National Superstock 600 Championship, a support class for the British Superbike Championship. He secured a victory at Brands Hatch and finished eighth in the standings with 101 points.

The following year, 2018, proved to be a dominant season for Vickers in the Junior Superstock class. He won ten out of twelve races, winning the championship title with 250 points, more than 100 points clear of his nearest competitor. At Cadwell Park, he broke the lap record whilst securing his seventh win. That same year, he also made a one-off appearance in the Supersport World Championship at Donington Park as a replacement rider on a Honda. However, he did not finish the race.

=== British Superbike Championship ===
==== 2019–2021: RAF Regular & Reserve Kawasaki ====
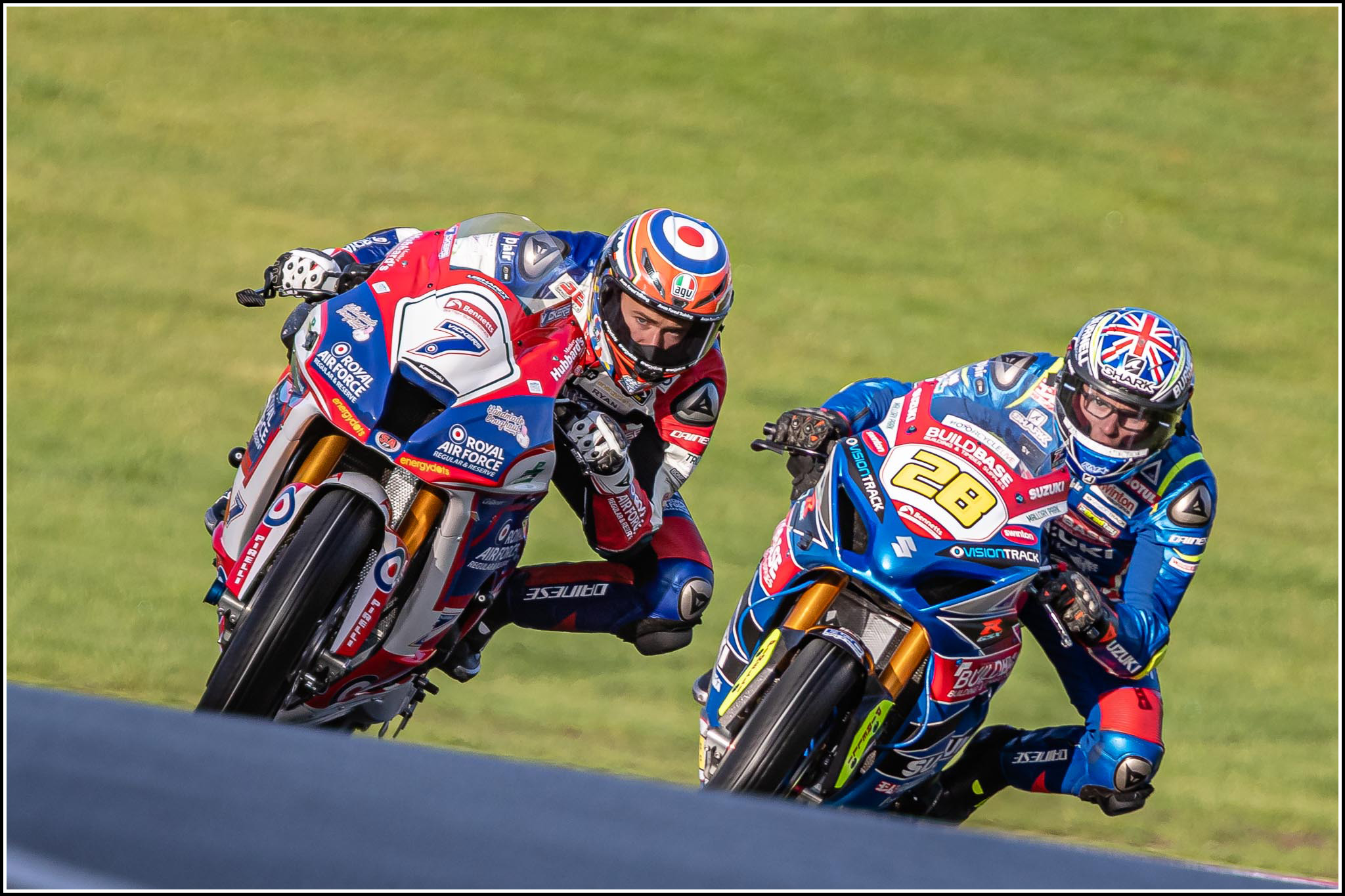
Vickers (left) during his first BSB season at Brands Hatch

Vickers moved up to the premier British Superbike Championship in 2019, joining the RAF Regular & Reserve Kawasaki team. In his rookie BSB season, he achieved eight top-ten finishes, with a best result of seventh place at Cadwell Park, ending the season 16th overall with 68 points. He remained with the team in 2020, improving to 15th in the standings with a best finish of fifth at Donington Park.

In 2021, his third season in BSB with the Kawasaki team, Vickers continued to show progress, securing two fourth-place finishes at Thruxton and finishing 12th in the championship with 180 points.

==== 2022: FHO Racing BMW ====
For the 2022 season, Vickers switched to the FHO Racing BMW team within the BSB paddock. Vickers finished the season in 17th.

==== 2023–2024: OMG Racing ====
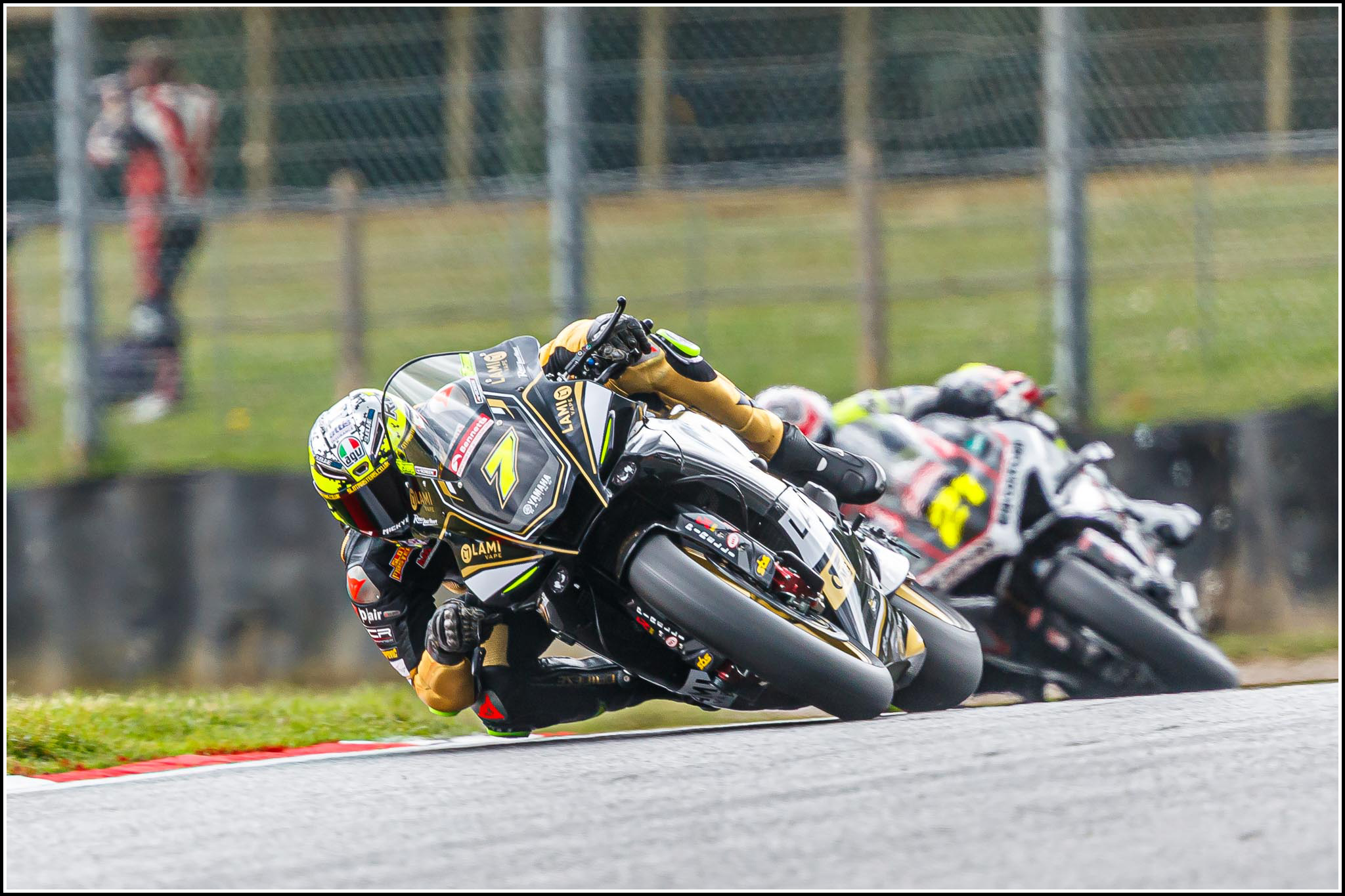
Vickers during Round 6 Brands Hatch FP1 in 2023

A significant turning point in Vickers' BSB career came in 2023 when he joined the LAMI OMG Racing Yamaha team. He scored his first BSB race wins and multiple podiums, demonstrating consistent front-running pace.

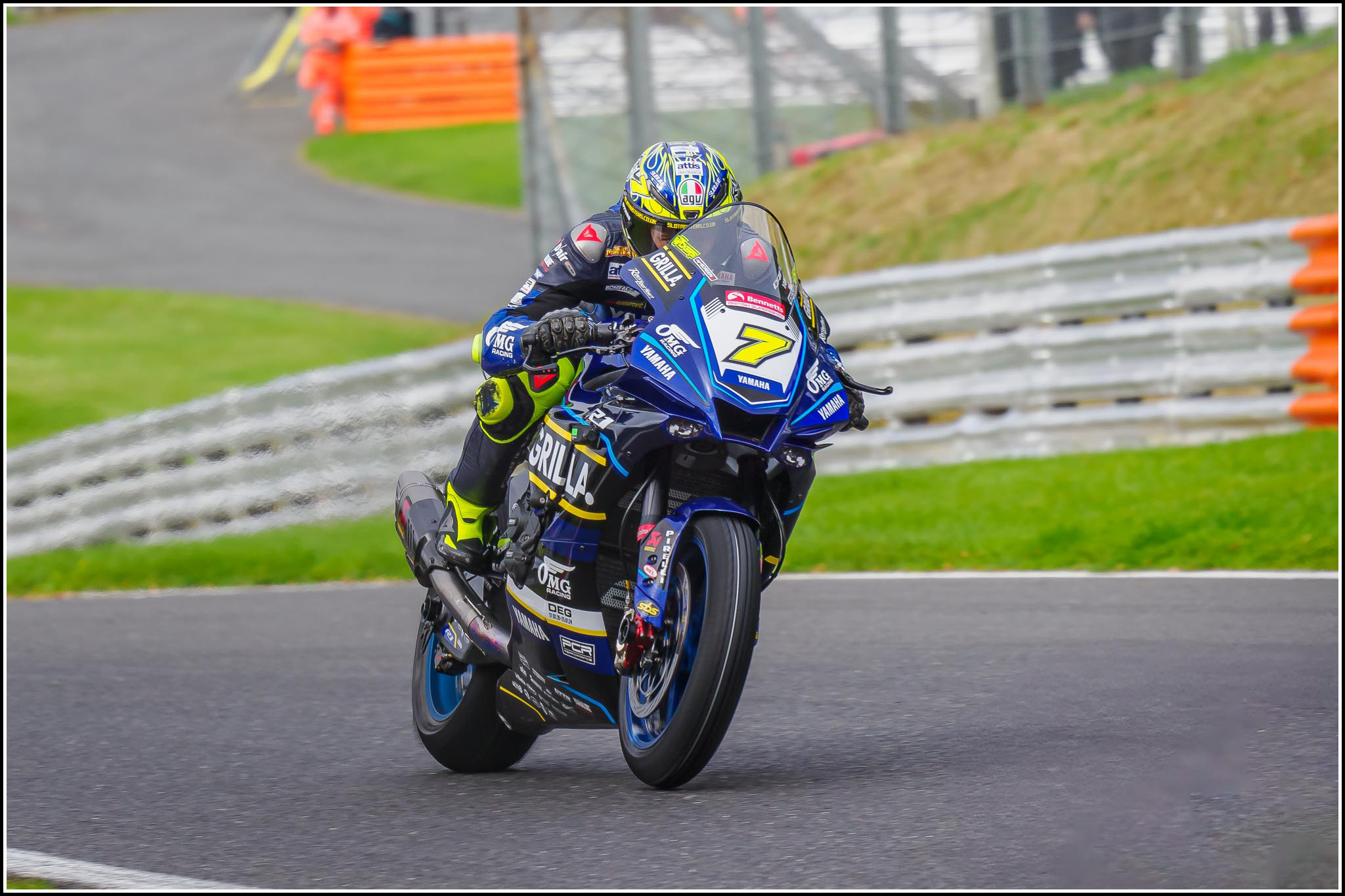
Vickers during Round 11 Brands Hatch in 2024

The 2024 BSB season was Vickers' most successful in the championship. Riding for OMG GRILLA Yamaha Racing, he secured seven race wins and a total of 13 podium finishes. He ended the season in fifth place overall with 349 points, having been a consistent podium contender and pole position setter. He achieved a double win at Navarra and a triple win at Brands Hatch.

==== 2026–present: Honda Racing UK ====
From 2026, Vickers will return to British Superbike racing with Honda Racing UK.

=== Superbike World Championship ===
In 2022, Vickers made a single wildcard appearance in the World Superbike Championship at Autodrom Most, riding for TPR Team Pedercini Racing. He did not score points, with a best finish of 17th.

Following his impressive 2024 BSB campaign, Vickers secured a full-time ride in the Superbike World Championship for 2025, replacing Michael Ruben Rinaldi. He joined the Italian Motocorsa Racing team, riding a Ducati Panigale V4 R. This move marks his full-time debut on the world stage. He showed strong pace in his debut round at Phillip Island, quickly adapting to the new machinery and scoring points in two of the three races, finishing 13th, 15th, and 15th, placing him 15th in the championship standings after the first round. At Estoril, it was announced that Vickers and Motocorsa will part ways at the end of 2025, and Vickers will return to the British Superbike Championship in 2026 to ride for Honda Racing. Vickers finished the season in 20th. However, second best of the 2025 rookies. He also got a tied-best (with Yari Montella) rookie finish of a seventh place in Hungary.

Vickers only spent one season in WorldSBK with Motocorsa Ducati, and after the 2025 season, he switched duties as an Honda HRC test rider.

== Career statistics ==
=== National Superstock 600 Championship ===
Year	Motorcycle	Wins	Pts	Plcd
2017	Yamaha	1	101	8th
2018	Yamaha	10	250	1st

=== British Superbike Championship ===
==== By season ====
Year	Team	Motorcycle	Races	Wins	Podiums	Pole	FLap	Pts	Plcd
2019	RAF Regular & Reserve Kawasaki	Kawasaki	18	0	0	0	0	68	16th
2020	RAF Regular & Reserve Kawasaki	Kawasaki	15	0	0	0	0	45	15th
2021	RAF Regular & Reserve Kawasaki	Kawasaki	33	0	0	0	0	180	12th
2022	FHO Racing BMW	BMW	30	0	0	0	0	65	17th
2023	LAMI OMG Racing Yamaha	Yamaha	29	2	7	2	3	306	8th
2024	OMG GRILLA Yamaha Racing	Yamaha	28	7	13	7	5	349	5th
2026	Honda Racing UK	Honda	33	5	10	1	2	435	4th
Total			186	14	30	10	10	1448	

==== Races by year ====
(key) (Races with a P indicate pole position; races with a F indicate fastest lap)

Year	Bike	1		2		3			4		5		6		7		8		9			10		11		12			Pos	Pts
Year	Bike	R1	R2	R1	R2	R1	R2	R3	R1	R2	R1	R2	R1	R2	R1	R2	R1	R2	R1	R2	R3	R1	R2	R1	R2	R1	R2	R3	Pos	Pts
2019	Kawasaki	SIL; 12	SIL; 15	OUL; 9	OUL; 10	DON; DNS	DON; DNS	DON; DNS	BRH; DNS	BRH; DNS	KNO	KNO	SNE; Ret	SNE; 12	THR; 12	THR; DNS	CAD; 10	CAD; 7	OUL; 10	OUL; Ret	OUL; 9	ASS; Ret	ASS; Ret	DON; 8	DON; 12	BRH; DNS	BRH; Ret	BRH; Ret	16th	68

Year	Bike	1			2			3			4			5			6			7			8			9			10			11			Pos	Pts
Year	Bike	R1	R2	R3	R1	R2	R3	R1	R2	R3	R1	R2	R3	R1	R2	R3	R1	R2	R3	R1	R2	R3	R1	R2	R3	R1	R2	R3	R1	R2	R3	R1	R2	R3	Pos	Pts
2020	Kawasaki	DON; 9	DON; 11	DON; 8	SNE; 9	SNE; Ret	SNE; Ret	SIL; 15	SIL; Ret	SIL; 17	OUL; 13	OUL; 14	OUL; 15	DON; 5	DON; Ret	DON; Ret	BRH; DNS	BRH; DNS	BRH; DNS																15th	45
2021	Kawasaki	OUL; 9	OUL; 11	OUL; 9	KNO; 7	KNO; 6	KNO; 9	BRH; 15	BRH; 15	BRH; 15	THR; 4	THR; Ret	THR; 4	DON; 6	DON; 7	DON; Ret	CAD; 8	CAD; 9	CAD; 10	SNE; 6	SNE; 7	SNE; 13	SIL; Ret	SIL; 8	SIL; 10	OUL; Ret	OUL; 13	OUL; 12	DON; 8	DON; 15	DON; 6	BRH; 18	BRH; 16	BRH; 12	12th	180
2022	BMW	SIL; 14	SIL; 13	SIL; 19	OUL; 14	OUL; 12	OUL; Ret	DON; Ret	DON; 9	DON; Ret	KNO; 15	KNO; Ret	KNO; Ret	BRH; Ret	BRH; Ret	BRH; DNS	THR; 11	THR; Ret	THR; 13	CAD; 13	CAD; 13	CAD; 13	SNE; Ret	SNE; DNS	SNE; DNS	OUL; Ret	OUL; 13	OUL; 13	DON; 10	DON; 10	DON; 8	BRH; Ret	BRH; Ret	BRH; 13	17th	65
2023	Yamaha	SIL; 13	SIL; 12	SIL; 10	OUL	OUL	OUL	DON; 7	DON; 2	DON; 4	KNO; 7	KNO; 4	KNO; 3	SNE; Ret	SNE; 9	SNE; 4^{†}	BRH; 1	BRH; 5	BRH; 3^{F}	THR; 3	THR; 4^{F}	THR; 5^{P}	CAD; 3^{P}	CAD; Ret	CAD; WD	OUL; DSQ	OUL; 9	OUL; 8	DON; 1	DON; 6	DON; Ret	BRH; 10	BRH; 4	BRH; 4	8th	306
2024	Yamaha	NAV; 1	NAV; 1		OUL; 5	OUL; 9	OUL; 3	DON; Ret^{P}	DON; Ret	DON; WD	KNO; Ret	KNO; WD	KNO; WD	SNE; 9^{P}	SNE; 7	SNE; 8	BRH; 1^{PF}	BRH; 1^{PF}	BRH; 1^{PF}	THR; 2	THR; 1^{F}	THR; 1^{P}	CAD; Ret	CAD; 6	CAD; Ret^{F}	OUL; 5	OUL; 12	OUL; DNS	DON; 7	DON; 11	DON; 3	BRH; 2^{P}	BRH; 3	BRH; 3	5th	349
2026	Honda	OUL; 8	OUL; 7	OUL; 8	DON; Ret	DON; 12	DON; 8	KNO; 4	KNO; Ret	KNO; 4	SNE; 5	SNE; NC	SNE; 4	BRH; 6	BRH; 5	BRH; 6	OUL; 6	OUL; 4	OUL; 4	THR; 3	THR; 1	THR; 1	CAD; Ret	CAD; 1	CAD; 1	ASS; 4	ASS; 4	ASS; 4	DON; 2	DON; 3	DON; 3	BRH; 3	BRH; 5	BRH; 1	4th	435

=== Superbike World Championship ===
==== By season ====
Season	Team	Motorcycle	Races	Wins	Podiums	Poles	FLaps	Pts	Plcd
2022	TPR Team Pedercini Racing	Kawasaki Ninja ZX-10RR	3	0	0	0	0	0	NC
2025	Motocorsa Racing	Ducati Panigale V4 R	35	0	0	0	0	45	20th
2026	Honda HRC	Honda CBR1000RR-R	6	0	0	0	0	1	27th
Total			44	0	0	0	0	46	

==== Races by year ====
(key) (Races with a P indicate pole position; races with a F indicate fastest lap)

Year	Bike	1			2			3			4			5			6			7			8			9			10			11			12			Pos	Pts
Year	Bike	R1	SR	R2	R1	SR	R2	R1	SR	R2	R1	SR	R2	R1	SR	R2	R1	SR	R2	R1	SR	R2	R1	SR	R2	R1	SR	R2	R1	SR	R2	R1	SR	R2	R1	SR	R2	Pos	Pts
2022	Kawasaki	SPA	SPA	SPA	NED	NED	NED	POR	POR	POR	ITA	ITA	ITA	GBR	GBR	GBR	CZE; 23	CZE; Ret	CZE; 17	FRA	FRA	FRA	SPA	SPA	SPA	POR	POR	POR	ARG	ARG	ARG	INA	INA	INA	AUS	AUS	AUS	NC	0
2025	Ducati	AUS; 13	AUS; 15	AUS; 15	POR; 16	POR; 19	POR; 14	NED; 15	NED; 10	NED; 18	ITA; 16	ITA; 17	ITA; Ret	CZE; 16	CZE; 17	CZE; 16	EMI; 13	EMI; 14	EMI; 11	GBR; 12	GBR; 11	GBR; 11	HUN; DNS	HUN; 7	HUN; Ret	FRA; 13	FRA; Ret	FRA; Ret	ARA; 14	ARA; 14	ARA; 15	POR; 12	POR; 11	POR; 13	SPA; 15	SPA; 12	SPA; 12	20th	45
2026	Honda	AUS; 15	AUS; 15	AUS; Ret	POR	POR	POR	NED	NED	NED	HUN	HUN	HUN	CZE	CZE	CZE	ARA	ARA	ARA	EMI; Ret	EMI; 17	EMI; 18	GBR	GBR	GBR	FRA	FRA	FRA	ITA	ITA	ITA	POR	POR	POR	SPA	SPA	SPA	27th	1

* Season still in progress.
