= Fraser Rogers =

British motorcycle racer

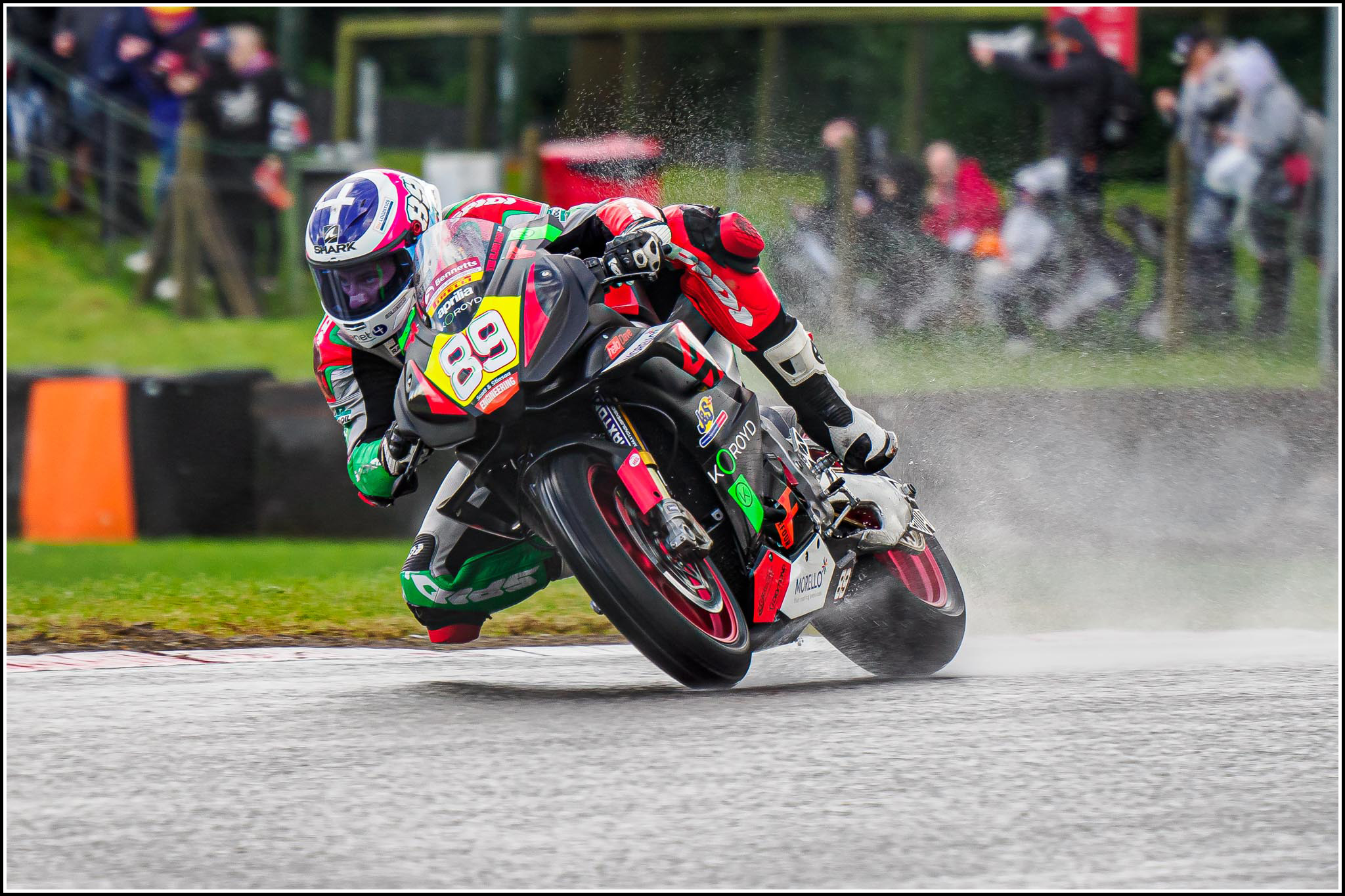
- Rogers racing for IN Competition Aprilia in 2023 at Brands Hatch
- Nationality: British
- Born: 19 December 1995 (age 30); Swindon, United Kingdom
- Current team: TAG Racing Honda
- Bike number: 89
Motorcycle racing career statistics
Moto2 World Championship
Active years	2021
Manufacturers	NTS
Championships	0
2021 championship position	38th (0 pts)
Starts / Wins / Podiums / Poles / F. laps / Points; 1 / 0 / 0 / 0 / 0 / 0
Moto3 World Championship
Active years	2012
Manufacturers	KRP Honda
Championships	0
2012 championship position	NC (0 pts)
Starts / Wins / Podiums / Poles / F. laps / Points; 1 / 0 / 0 / 0 / 0 / 0
Supersport World Championship
Active years	2013–2014
Manufacturers	Honda
Championships	0
2014 championship position	31st (1 pt)
Starts / Wins / Podiums / Poles / F. laps / Points; 7 / 0 / 0 / 0 / 0 / 1
British Superbike Championship
Active years	2025–
Manufacturers	Honda
Championships	0
2025 championship position	13th (66 pts)
Starts / Wins / Podiums / Poles / F. laps / Points; 14 / 0 / 1 / 0 / 0 / 66

Fraser Rogers (born 19 December 1995 in Swindon) is a British former Grand Prix motorcycle racer. Previously racing in the British National Superstock 1000 Championship, from 2024, he competes aboard a Honda CBR1000RR in the inaugural 'Pathway' class, using upgraded Superstock machines run within the British Superbike Championship.

== Career statistics ==
2008–1st, British Aprilia Superteens #89 Aprilia
2009–26th, Red Bull MotoGP Rookies Cup #89 KTM FFR 125 / 1st, Thundersport GB GP3 Championship #89 Honda RS125R
2010–6th, British 125cc Championship #89 Honda RS125R
2011–18th, CEV Moto3 Championship #89 Aprilia RS 125
2012–14th, CEV Moto3 Championship #89 KRP Honda
2013–24th, CEV Moto3 Championship (One race only) #89 Honda NSF250R
2013 - NC, European Junior Cup, Honda CBR500R
2014–31st, Supersport World Championship #89 Honda CBR600RR
2016–6th, British National Superstock 1000 Championship #89 Kawasaki ZX-10R
2017–5th British National Superstock 1000 Championship #89 Kawasaki ZX-10R
2018 - 29th, European Superstock 1000 Championship, Kawasaki ZX-10R

=== Red Bull MotoGP Rookies Cup ===
==== Races by year ====
(key) (Races in bold indicate pole position, races in italics indicate fastest lap)

Year	1	2	3	4	5	6	7	8	Pos	Pts
2009	SPA1; Ret	SPA2; Ret	ITA; 18	NED; 22	GER; 16	GBR; 13	CZE1; 25	CZE2; 20	26th	3

=== British 125 Championship ===
Year	Bike	1	2	3	4	5	6	7	8	9	10	11	12	13	Pos	Pts
2010	Honda	BRH; 3	THR; 6	OUL; Ret	CAD; 4	MAL; DSQ	KNO; C	SNE; Ret	BRH; 4	CAD; Ret	CRO; 10	CRO; 11	SIL; 4	OUL; 5	**6th**	**84**

=== FIM CEV Moto3 Championship ===
==== Races by year ====
(key) (Races in bold indicate pole position; races in italics indicate fastest lap)

Year	Bike	1	2	3	4	5	6	7	8	9	Pos	Pts
2012	KRP Honda	JER; 24	NAV; 6	ARA; 14	CAT; 11	ALB1; 10	ALB2; 6	VAL; Ret			14th	33
2013	Honda	CAT1; 5	CAT2; Ret	ARA	ALB1	ALB2	NAV	VAL1	VAL1	JER	24th	11

=== European Superstock 1000 Championship ===
==== Races by year ====
(key) (Races in bold indicate pole position) (Races in italics indicate fastest lap)

Year	Bike	1	2	3	4	5	6	7	8	Pos	Pts
2018	Kawasaki	ARA	NED; 14	IMO	DON	BRN	MIS	ALG	MAG	29th	2

=== Grand Prix motorcycle racing ===
==== By season ====
Season	Class	Motorcycle	Team	Number	Race	Win	Podium	Pole	FLap	Pts	Plcd
2012	Moto3	KRP Honda	Racing Steps Foundation KRP	79	1	0	0	0	0	0	NC
2021	Moto2	NTS	NTS RW Racing GP	89	1	0	0	0	0	0	38th
Total					**2**	**0**	**0**	**0**	**0**	**0**	

==== By class ====
Class	Seasons	1st GP	1st Pod	1st Win	Race	Win	Podiums	Pole	FLap	Pts	WChmp
Moto3	2012	2012 Great Britain			1	0	0	0	0	0	0
Moto2	2021	2021 Portugal			1	0	0	0	0	0	0
Total	2012, 2021				**2**	**0**	**0**	**0**	**0**	**0**	**0**

==== Races by year ====
(key) (Races in bold indicate pole position; races in italics indicate fastest lap)

Year	Class	Bike	1	2	3	4	5	6	7	8	9	10	11	12	13	14	15	16	17	18	Pos	Pts
2012	Moto3	KRP Honda	QAT	SPA	POR	FRA	CAT	GBR; Ret	NED	GER	ITA	INP	CZE	RSM	ARA	JPN	MAL	AUS	VAL		NC	0
2021	Moto2	NTS	QAT	DOH	POR; 20	SPA	FRA	ITA	CAT	GER	NED	STY	AUT	GBR	ARA	RSM	AME	EMI	ALR	VAL	38th	0

=== Supersport World Championship ===
==== Races by year ====
(key) (Races in bold indicate pole position; races in italics indicate fastest lap)

Year	Bike	1	2	3	4	5	6	7	8	9	10	11	12	13	Pos	Pts
2013	Honda	AUS	SPA	NED	ITA	GBR	POR	ITA	RUS	GBR	GER	TUR	FRA	SPA; Ret	NC	0
2014	Honda	AUS; 15	SPA; 18	NED; 19	ITA; 16	GBR; 18	MAL; 16	SMR	POR	SPA	FRA	QAT			31st	1

=== British Superbike Championship ===
(key) (Races in bold indicate pole position; races in italics indicate fastest lap)

Year	Make	1		2		3			4		5		6			7		8			9			10		11		12			Pos	Pts
Year	Make	R1	R2	R1	R2	R1	R2	R3	R1	R2	R1	R2	R1	R2	R3	R1	R2	R1	R2	R3	R1	R2	R3	R1	R2	R1	R2	R1	R2	R3	Pos	Pts
2018	Kawasaki	DON	DON	BHI	BHI	OUL	OUL		SNE	SNE	KNO; Ret	KNO; 16	BHGP; 19	BHGP; 21		THR; 17	THR; Ret	CAD; 17	CAD; Ret		SIL; 20	SIL; DNS	SIL; DNS	OUL; 15	OUL; 15	ASS; 21	ASS; 14	BHGP; Ret	BHGP; Ret	BHGP; DNS	33rd	4

Year	Bike	1		2		3			4		5		6		7		8		9			10		11		12			Pos	Pts
Year	Bike	R1	R2	R1	R2	R1	R2	R3	R1	R2	R1	R2	R1	R2	R1	R2	R1	R2	R1	R2	R3	R1	R2	R1	R2	R1	R2	R3	Pos	Pts
2019	Kawasaki	SIL; 20	SIL; Ret	OUL; DNS	OUL; DNS	DON	DON	DON	BRH	BRH	KNO; DNS	KNO; DNS	SNE; 22	SNE; Ret	THR; 19	THR; DNS	CAD; Ret	CAD; DNS	OUL	OUL	OUL	ASS	ASS	DON	DON	BHGP	BHGP	BHGP	NC	0

Year	Bike	1			2			3			4			5			6			7			8			9			10			11			Pos	Pts
Year	Bike	R1	R2	R3	R1	R2	R3	R1	R2	R3	R1	R2	R3	R1	R2	R3	R1	R2	R3	R1	R2	R3	R1	R2	R3	R1	R2	R3	R1	R2	R3	R1	R2	R3	Pos	Pts
2023	Aprilia	SIL	SIL	SIL	OUL	OUL	OUL	DON	DON	DON	KNO	KNO	KNO	SNE	SNE	SNE	BRH	BRH	BRH	THR	THR	THR	CAD	CAD	CAD	OUL	OUL	OUL	DON	DON	DON	BRH; 17	BRH; Ret	BRH; 19	NC	0
2024	Honda	NAV; 13	NAV; Ret		OUL; 12	OUL; 20	OUL; 14	DON; 13	DON; 10	DON; 12	KNO; 13	KNO; 6	KNO; 6	SNE	SNE	SNE	BRH	BRH	BRH	THR; Ret	THR; 17	THR; DNS	CAD; WD	CAD; WD	CAD; WD	OUL; 17	OUL; 10	OUL; DNS	DON; 17	DON; 17	DON; Ret	BRH	BRH	BRH	20th	51
2025	Honda	OUL; 14	OUL; 18	OUL; C	DON; 13	DON; 12	DON; 15	SNE; 12	SNE; 11	SNE; 12	KNO; 11	KNO; 6	KNO; 3	BRH; 13	BRH; 11	BRH; 10	THR	THR	THR	CAD	CAD	CAD	DON	DON	DON	ASS	ASS	ASS	OUL	OUL	OUL	BRH	BRH	BRH	13th*	66*

^{*} Season still in progress.
