= Paul Bird Motorsport =

British motorcycle racing team

(United Kingdom) Paul Bird Motorsport
- 2025 name: Hager PBM Ducati
- Base: Penrith, Cumbria, England
- Principal: Jordan Bird; Frank Bird Jr.
- Rider(s): 45 (England) Scott Redding
- Motorcycle: Ducati Panigale V4R F23
- Tyres: Pirelli
- Riders' Championships: 9 (Scotland) Steve Hislop (2002 British Superbike) (England) Shane Byrne x5 (2003 British Superbike) (2012 British Superbike) (2014 British Superbike) (2016 British Superbike) (2017 British Superbike) (England) Scott Redding (2019 British Superbike) (Australia) Josh Brookes (2020 British Superbike) (England) Tommy Bridewell (2023 British Superbike)

Paul Bird Motorsport is a British motorcycle road racing, car racing and rallying organisation. From 2024, following owner Paul Bird's death in 2023, the motorcycle road racing operation was renamed Paul Bird Racing with Glenn Irwin as sole rider in British Superbike class. Paul Bird had competed as a rally driver and a solo-rider in motocross. His son Frank is a car racer.

== Motorcycle racing ==
The team competes in the British Superbike Championship, using Ducati machinery from 2016, based on the 1199 Panigale R, followed by Ducati Panigale V4, a change of manufacturer from Kawasaki. They managed the Kawasaki World Superbike team until 2011, and competed in MotoGP from the 2012 season.

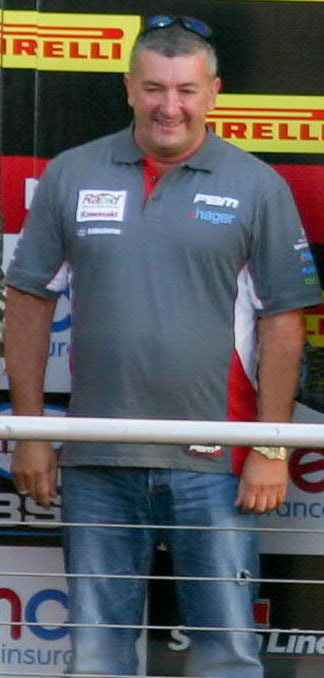
Championship winning team principal, the late Paul Bird acknowledging the spectators' plaudits at Brands Hatch Showdown podium, end of BSB season 2014

PBM competed in the 2014 British Superbike Championship as a two-rider team with Shane Byrne and Stuart Easton on board Kawasakis. Also in 2014 Ian Hutchinson joined Paul Bird Motorsport for a few rounds of Pirelli National Superstock 1000 competition on the Rapid Solicitors Kawasaki team, after which he again competed in the Macau road GP on Shane Byrne's superbike, but without his previous year's success, overshooting a corner and retiring after a low-speed fall. The race was won by PBM rider Stuart Easton.

For 2015, Hutchinson competed in selected BSB rounds and Paul Bird's first foray into racing on closed public roads in UK, involving the North West 200 and the Ulster Grand Prix in Northern Ireland and also in the Isle of Man TT races, where he won three TT races and a TT Championship.

On 16 October 2015, Paul Bird Motorsport announced a sponsorship arrangement with Be Wiser Insurance and that the 2016 BSB team would be four-time BSB champion Shane Byrne and Glenn Irwin, riding Ducati Panigale Rs. This sponsorship continued until the end of 2019 season. For 2020 and 2021, the team arranged a new title sponsor by Kent-based Video Telematics business VisionTrack, followed by MCE insurance for 2022, changing to BeerMonster from 2023.

== Paul Bird ==
In December 2015, Paul Bird received a ban from organised sport competitions until July 2017 administered by UKAD, the UK Anti-Doping agency, after failing a standard test for banned substances. He tested positive for cocaine after driving in a car rally event in July 2015. This was followed by an eight-year ban imposed in 2019 by UKAD, for refusing a drugs-test following a Welsh rally event in April 2018. The ban was set to run from 11 July 2018 until 2026.

Bird's son Frank drove in Ford MSA Formula for Fortec Motorsport in 2016, after the 2015 season in Ginetta Junior Championship.

For 2022, Frank Bird competed in Asian Le Mans Series, having participated in some rally car driving during the winter, and intends to enter the Sol Rally Barbados in June 2022, twice won by Paul Bird.

Paul Bird died on 1 September 2023 after a short illness aged 56.

== MotoGP ==
=== MotoGP Team ===
PBM competed in the 2012 MotoGP season with an ART-Aprilia bike entered to CRT regulations ridden by James Ellison, and with riders Michael Laverty and Broc Parkes in the 2014 MotoGP season before disbanding to concentrate on British Superbikes.

=== Results ===
(key) (Races in bold indicate pole position; races in italics indicate fastest lap)

Year	Bike	Tyres	Riders	1	2	3	4	5	6	7	8	9	10	11	12	13	14	15	16	17	18	Points	Pos.
2012	ART GP12	B		QAT	ESP	POR	FRA	CAT	GBR	NED	GER	ITA	USA	IND	CZE	SMR	ARA	JPN	MAL	AUS	VAL	35	11th
2012	ART GP12	B	(United Kingdom) James Ellison	18	Ret	Ret	11	16	14	14	15	14	Ret	15	15	13	14	14	9	Ret	9	35	11th
2013	PBM 01	B		QAT	AME	ESP	FRA	ITA	CAT	NED	GER	USA	IND	CZE	GBR	SMR	ARA	MAL	AUS	JPN	VAL	10	12th
2013	PBM 01	B	(Australia) Damian Cudlin														Ret	Ret	21	21	Ret	10	12th
2013	PBM 01	B	(United Kingdom) Michael Laverty	17	16	13	17	17	Ret	22	16	Ret	18	18	19	18						10	12th
2013	ART GP13	B	(United Kingdom) Michael Laverty														Ret	Ret	18	19	17	10	12th
2013	ART GP13	B	(Colombia) Yonny Hernández	14	15	Ret	Ret	16	13	19	Ret	15	Ret	16	20	Ret						10	12th
2014	PBM	B		QAT	AME	ARG	ESP	FRA	ITA	CAT	NED	GER	IND	CZE	GBR	SMR	ARA	JPN	AUS	MAL	VAL	18	12th
2014	PBM	B	(Australia) Broc Parkes	15	Ret	21	17	18	17	16	11	21	15	19	21	18	18	20	Ret	14	20	18	12th
2014	PBM	B	(United Kingdom) Michael Laverty	16	16	18	16	16	16	17	21	Ret	14	Ret	17	17	16	18	13	12	19	18	12th
