= Moto Rapido Racing =

British motorcycle racing team

(United Kingdom) Moto Rapido Racing
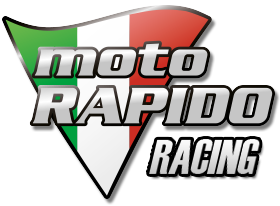
- 2025 name: Moto Rapido Racing Ducati
- Base: Winchester, Hampshire, England
- Team principal/s: Steve 'Wilf' Moore
- Race riders: British Superbike Championship: 91. (England) Leon Haslam; British Supersport Championship: 4. (England) Harry Truelove; 14. (Republic of Ireland) James McManus; 15. (Republic of Ireland) Eugene McManus; 61. (Australia) Ben Currie
- Motorcycle: Ducati
- Tyres: Pirelli
- Riders' Championships: Ben Currie (2023 British Supersport)

Moto Rapido Racing is a motorbike racing team, competing in the British Superbike Championship and British Supersport Championship, winning the 2023 Championship.

== History ==
The Moto Rapido Ducati team progressed to the MCE Insurance British Superbike Championship in 2011 after a season in the National Superstock 1000 Championship with Scott Smart.

From then the team competed in many seasons with a Ducati Superstock 1000 including a maiden race win with Tristan Palmer. They also entered the British Superbike class and every race improved their bike and results.

In 2015 the team signed a deal with Lloyds British to compete in the Superbike class with Czech contender Jakub Smrž, but after several good results, Smrz had a crash at the Snetterton Circuit, meaning he would be out. American John Hopkins took his place as a replacement rider and took the team to a record result at the final round of the 2015 season of 3rd place.

In 2016 the team signed Danny Buchan but after a successful start to the year in testing, things didn't work during the start of the season. The team's replacement rider was Scotsman Stuart Easton, but he also dropped out, and Ducati test rider Alessandro Polita was the final rider of the season.

For 2017 the team signed American John Hopkins to compete in the British Superbike class. Hopkins was badly injured at Brands Hatch requiring extensive surgeries and physical rehabilitation that effectively ended his racing career. Thomas Strudwick also rode during 2017 in Motostar standard class.

For the first half of the 2018 season, the superbike rider was Taylor Mackenzie, replacing injured Hopkins. The team and Mackenzie announced their mutual decision to part company at the Knockhill BSB round practice session on 7 July, due to the rider's poor results.

For the second half of the 2018 season Tommy Bridewell succeeded Mackenzie as sole BSB rider. He was retained for 2019 finishing in third place with 636 points, and again for 2020.

== Supersport World Championship ==
=== Results ===
(key) (Races in bold indicate pole position; races in italics indicate fastest lap)

Year	Team	Bike	No	Rider	1	2	3	4	5	6	7	8	9	10	11	12	13	14	15	16	17	18	19	20	21	22	23	24	Pos	Pts	Constructors		Manufacturers	
Year	Team	Bike	No	Rider	1	2	3	4	5	6	7	8	9	10	11	12	13	14	15	16	17	18	19	20	21	22	23	24	Pos	Pts	Pos	Pts	Pos	Pts
2025	MMB Racing	Ducati Panigale V2	15	(Republic of Ireland) Eugene McManus	AUS	AUS	POR; 25	POR; 22	NED	NED	ITA	ITA	CZE	CZE	EMI	EMI	GBR	GBR	HUN	HUN	FRA	FRA	ARA	ARA	POR	POR	SPA	SPA	0*	40th*	0*	25th*	144*	3rd*
2025	MMB Racing	Ducati Panigale V2	44	(United Kingdom) Harry Truelove	AUS	AUS	POR; 29	POR; 27	NED	NED	ITA	ITA	CZE	CZE	EMI	EMI	GBR	GBR	HUN	HUN	FRA	FRA	ARA	ARA	POR	POR	SPA	SPA	0*	43rd*	0*	25th*	144*	3rd*
