= 2025 British Superbike Championship =

38th British motorcycle Championship

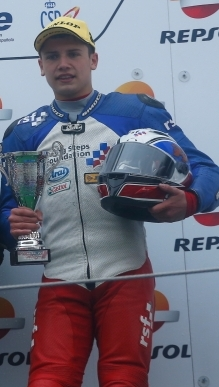
Kyle Ryde successfully defended his Riders' Championship title

The 2025 British Superbike Championship season was the 38th season of the motorcycle championship. Kyle Ryde won his second championship after entering the season as the defending champion after winning the 2024 season by one point over the previous champion Tommy Bridewell. Ryde's team, Nitrous Competitions Racing Yamaha, successfully defended their Ceratizit Teams' Trophy.

== Teams and riders ==
2025 Entry List
Team	Constructor	No.	Rider	Rounds
Sencat IN Competition by Swan Racing Aprilia	Aprilia	8	(Scotland) Lewis Rollo	4–5
Sencat IN Competition by Swan Racing Aprilia	Aprilia	66	(England) Tom Sykes	2–3
Sencat IN Competition by Swan Racing Aprilia	Aprilia	99	(England) Danny Webb	6
Bathams AJN Racing BMW	BMW	79	(England) Storm Stacey	All
LEW 8TEN Racing BMW Motorrad	BMW	7	(England) Davey Todd	All
LEW 8TEN Racing BMW Motorrad	BMW	60	(England) Peter Hickman	1–2, 8–11
ROKiT MLav Racing BMW Motorrad	BMW	5	(Republic of Ireland) Richard Kerr	All
Hager PBM Ducati	Ducati	2	(Northern Ireland) Glenn Irwin	1–2
Hager PBM Ducati	Ducati	4	(England) Scott Redding	4–11
Oxford Racing Products Ducati	Ducati	91	(England) Leon Haslam	All
Cheshire Mouldings Ducati	Ducati	11	(Scotland) Rory Skinner	All
Honda Racing UK	Honda	46	(England) Tommy Bridewell	All
Honda Racing UK	Honda	18	(Northern Ireland) Andrew Irwin	1–8
Honda Racing UK	Honda	55	(England) Dean Harrison	10
C&L Fairburn Properties /Look Forward Racing Honda	Honda	3	(Australia) Billy McConnell	1–8, 10–11
DAO Racing Honda	Honda	14	(England) Lee Jackson	1–5, 9–11
DAO Racing Honda	Honda	19	(Italy) Gabriele Giannini	6-7
DAO Racing Honda	Honda	19	(England) Joe Talbot	8
DAO Racing Honda	Honda	25	(Australia) Josh Brookes	All
TAG Honda	Honda	74	(Netherlands) Jaimie van Sikkelerus	All
TAG Honda	Honda	89	(England) Fraser Rogers	All
SendMyBag Racing by IWR Honda	Honda	45	(England) Scott Swann	All
NP Racing Honda	Honda	51	(South Africa) Blaze Baker	1–6, 9–11
Whitecliffe CDH Racing Honda	Honda	16	(England) Jamie Davis	1–2, 4–11
Whitecliffe CDH Racing Honda	Honda	23	(England) Luke Hedger	All
MasterMac Honda	Honda	17	(Scotland) John McPhee	All
MasterMac Honda	Honda	86	(England) Charlie Nesbitt	All
AJN Steelstock Kawasaki	Kawasaki	21	(England) Christian Iddon	All
AJN Steelstock Kawasaki	Kawasaki	30	(England) Max Cook	All
Druiijff Racing Kawasaki	Kawasaki	77	(Netherlands) Wayne Tessels	9
OMG Nitrous Competitions Racing Yamaha	Yamaha	1	(England) Kyle Ryde	All
OMG Nitrous Competitions Racing Yamaha	Yamaha	2	(Northern Ireland) Glenn Irwin	6-11
McAMS Racing Yamaha	Yamaha	52	(England) Danny Kent	1–9, 11
McAMS Racing Yamaha	Yamaha	52	(England) Kam Dixon	10
Raceways Yamaha	Yamaha	28	(England) Bradley Ray	All

=== Rider changes ===
2022 BSB champion Bradley Ray has returned to the series to ride for Raceways Yamaha as their solo driver. This return comes after two years on the international stage in the Superbike World Championship. Conversely, Ryan Vickers has left BSB after six seasons to join Motocorsa Racing for the 2025 Superbike World Championship. After two seasons with BMW, Josh Brookes has switched to Honda, riding for DAO Racing. After missing most of his 2024 season return, Rory Skinner has also switched from BMW to ride for Cheshire Mouldings Ducati. Scott Redding, the 2019 British Superbike Champion, made a comeback to the championship. Redding joined Hager PBM Ducati, from Round 4 of the 2025 season, marking his departure from the 2025 Superbike World Championship. On the 5th of August, days after Glenn Irwin announced his comeback after an injury at Snetterton, Irwin announced that Hager PBM Ducati and himself have mutually parted ways, leaving Redding as their sole rider. OMG Racing announced on the same day the Irwin had joined them, partnering defending champion Kyle Ryde. Danny Webb replaced Swan Racing rider Lewis Rollo, who is injured, for Round 6 at Thruxton. After Lee Jackson broke his foot at Brands Hatch during Round 5, Italian rider Gabriele Giannini made his debut with DAO Racing Honda for Round 6 at Thruxton.

== Race Calendar ==
2025 British Superbike UK Race Locations
Location of Assen within the Netherlands

Round		Circuit	Date
1	R1	Oulton Park (International Circuit, Cheshire)	3–5 May
1	R2	Oulton Park (International Circuit, Cheshire)	3–5 May
1	R3	Oulton Park (International Circuit, Cheshire)	3–5 May
2	R1	Donington Park (Grand Prix Circuit, Leicestershire)	16–18 May
2	R2	Donington Park (Grand Prix Circuit, Leicestershire)	16–18 May
2	R3	Donington Park (Grand Prix Circuit, Leicestershire)	16–18 May
3	R1	Snetterton Motor Racing Circuit (300 Circuit, Norfolk)	20–22 June
3	R2	Snetterton Motor Racing Circuit (300 Circuit, Norfolk)	20–22 June
3	R3	Snetterton Motor Racing Circuit (300 Circuit, Norfolk)	20–22 June
4	R1	Knockhill Racing Circuit (Fife)	4–6 July
4	R2	Knockhill Racing Circuit (Fife)	4–6 July
4	R3	Knockhill Racing Circuit (Fife)	4–6 July
5	R1	Brands Hatch (Grand Prix Circuit, Kent)	25–27 July
5	R2	Brands Hatch (Grand Prix Circuit, Kent)	25–27 July
5	R3	Brands Hatch (Grand Prix Circuit, Kent)	25–27 July
6	R1	Thruxton Circuit (Hampshire)	8–10 August
6	R2	Thruxton Circuit (Hampshire)	8–10 August
6	R3	Thruxton Circuit (Hampshire)	8–10 August
7	R1	Cadwell Park (Lincolnshire)	23–25 August
7	R2	Cadwell Park (Lincolnshire)	23–25 August
7	R3	Cadwell Park (Lincolnshire)	23–25 August
8	R1	Donington Park (Grand Prix Circuit, Leicestershire)	5–7 September
8	R2	Donington Park (Grand Prix Circuit, Leicestershire)	5–7 September
8	R3	Donington Park (Grand Prix Circuit, Leicestershire)	5–7 September
8	R4	Donington Park (Grand Prix Circuit, Leicestershire)	5–7 September
The Showdown
9	R1	TT Circuit Assen (Grand Prix Circuit, Netherlands)	19–21 September
9	R2	TT Circuit Assen (Grand Prix Circuit, Netherlands)	19–21 September
9	R3	TT Circuit Assen (Grand Prix Circuit, Netherlands)	19–21 September
10	R1	Oulton Park (International Circuit, Cheshire)	3–5 October
10	R2	Oulton Park (International Circuit, Cheshire)	3–5 October
10	R3	Oulton Park (International Circuit, Cheshire)	3–5 October
The Showdown Finale
11	R1	Brands Hatch (Grand Prix Circuit, Kent)	17–19 October
11	R2	Brands Hatch (Grand Prix Circuit, Kent)	17–19 October
11	R3	Brands Hatch (Grand Prix Circuit, Kent)	17–19 October

=== Calendar changes ===
During Round 1 at Oulton Park, police shut down the circuit after two riders were killed in the British Supersport Championship Race 2 during the first lap. The third Superbike race of the meeting was rescheduled for Round 8 at Donington Park, host of Round 8 as the first race of four "Sprint" length races.

== Results ==
Main Season
Round		Circuit	Date	Pole position	Fastest lap	Winning rider	Winning team
1	R1	(England) Oulton Park	4 May	(England) Bradley Ray	(England) Bradley Ray	(England) Bradley Ray	Raceways Yamaha
1	R2	(England) Oulton Park	5 May		(England) Leon Haslam	(England) Leon Haslam	Oxford Racing Products Ducati
1	R3	(England) Oulton Park	5 May		Rescheduled for Donington Park Round 8 because of police investigation		
2	R1	(England) Donington Park	17 May	(England) Bradley Ray	(England) Kyle Ryde	(England) Bradley Ray	Raceways Yamaha
2	R2	(England) Donington Park	18 May		(Scotland) Rory Skinner	(England) Bradley Ray	Raceways Yamaha
2	R3	(England) Donington Park	18 May		(Northern Ireland) Glenn Irwin	(England) Bradley Ray	Raceways Yamaha
3	R1	(England) Snetterton	21 June	(England) Bradley Ray	(England) Bradley Ray	(England) Bradley Ray	Raceways Yamaha
3	R2	(England) Snetterton	22 June		(England) Bradley Ray	(England) Bradley Ray	Raceways Yamaha
3	R3	(England) Snetterton	22 June		(England) Bradley Ray	(England) Bradley Ray	Raceways Yamaha
4	R1	(Scotland) Knockhill	5 July	(England) Bradley Ray	(England) Bradley Ray	(England) Bradley Ray	Raceways Yamaha
4	R2	(Scotland) Knockhill	6 July		(England) Bradley Ray	(England) Bradley Ray	Raceways Yamaha
4	R3	(Scotland) Knockhill	6 July		(Scotland) Rory Skinner	(Scotland) Rory Skinner	Cheshire Mouldings Ducati
5	R1	(England) Brands Hatch	26 July	(England) Bradley Ray	(England) Scott Redding	(England) Bradley Ray	Raceways Yamaha
5	R2	(England) Brands Hatch	27 July		(England) Bradley Ray	(England) Scott Redding	Hager PBM Ducati
5	R3	(England) Brands Hatch	27 July		(England) Danny Kent	(England) Kyle Ryde	OMG Nitrous Competitions Racing Yamaha
6	R1	(England) Thruxton	9 August	(England) Kyle Ryde	(England) Max Cook	(England) Kyle Ryde	OMG Nitrous Competitions Racing Yamaha
6	R2	(England) Thruxton	10 August		(England) Bradley Ray	(England) Danny Kent	McAMS Racing Yamaha
6	R3	(England) Thruxton	10 August		(England) Danny Kent	(England) Danny Kent	McAMS Racing Yamaha
7	R1	(England) Cadwell Park	24 August	(England) Bradley Ray	(England) Bradley Ray	(England) Bradley Ray	Raceways Yamaha
7	R2	(England) Cadwell Park	25 August		(Northern Ireland) Andrew Irwin	(England) Tommy Bridewell	Honda Racing UK
7	R3	(England) Cadwell Park	25 August		(England) Kyle Ryde	(England) Kyle Ryde	OMG Nitrous Competitions Racing Yamaha
8	R1	(England) Donington Park	6 September	(England) Scott Redding	(England) Kyle Ryde	(England) Scott Redding	Hager PBM Ducati
8	R2	(England) Donington Park	6 September		(England) Kyle Ryde	(England) Kyle Ryde	OMG Nitrous Competitions Racing Yamaha
8	R3	(England) Donington Park	7 September		(England) Bradley Ray	(England) Kyle Ryde	OMG Nitrous Competitions Racing Yamaha
8	R4	(England) Donington Park	7 September		(England) Kyle Ryde	(England) Kyle Ryde	OMG Nitrous Competitions Racing Yamaha
The Showdown
9	R1	(Netherlands) Assen	20 September	(England) Bradley Ray	(England) Christian Iddon	(England) Scott Redding	Hager PBM Ducati
9	R2	(Netherlands) Assen	21 September		(England) Kyle Ryde	(England) Christian Iddon	AJN Steelstock Kawasaki
9	R3	(Netherlands) Assen	21 September		(England) Scott Redding	(England) Scott Redding	Hager PBM Ducati
10	R1	(England) Oulton Park	4 October	(England) Charlie Nesbitt	(Australia) Josh Brookes	(Australia) Josh Brookes	DAO Racing Honda
10	R2	(England) Oulton Park	5 October		(England) Bradley Ray	(England) Bradley Ray	Raceways Yamaha
10	R3	(England) Oulton Park	5 October		(England) Leon Haslam	(England) Scott Redding	Hager PBM Ducati
11	R1	(England) Brands Hatch	18 October	(England) Bradley Ray	(England) Bradley Ray	(England) Scott Redding	Hager PBM Ducati
11	R2	(England) Brands Hatch	19 October		(England) Scott Redding	(England) Scott Redding	Hager PBM Ducati
11	R3	(England) Brands Hatch	19 October		(England) Danny Kent	(England) Danny Kent	McAMS Racing Yamaha

== Championship Standings ==
=== Riders' Championship ===
Scoring system in the Main season

Points are awarded to the top fifteen finishers. A rider has to finish the race to earn points.

Position	1st	2nd	3rd	4th	5th	6th	7th	8th	9th	10th	11th	12th	13th	14th	15th
Points	18	16	14	12	11	10	9	8	7	6	5	4	3	2	1

Scoring system in the first two rounds in the showdown

Points are awarded to the top fifteen finishers. A rider has to finish the race to earn points.

Position	1st	2nd	3rd	4th	5th	6th	7th	8th	9th	10th	11th	12th	13th	14th	15th
Points	25	22	20	18	16	14	12	10	8	6	5	4	3	2	1

Scoring system in the season finale

Points are awarded to the top fifteen finishers. A rider has to finish the race to earn points.

Position	1st	2nd	3rd	4th	5th	6th	7th	8th	9th	10th	11th	12th	13th	14th	15th
Points	35	30	27	24	22	20	18	16	14	12	10	8	6	4	2

Pos.	Rider	Bike	OUL (England)			DON (England)			SNE (England)			KNO (Scotland)			BRH (England)			THR (England)			CAD (England)			DON (England)				ASS (Netherlands)			OUL (England)			BRH (England)			Pts.
Pos.	Rider	Bike	R1	R2	R3	R1	R2	R3	R1	R2	R3	R1	R2	R3	R1	R2	R3	R1	R2	R3	R1	R2	R3	R1	R2	R3	R4	R1	R2	R3	R1	R2	R3	R1	R2	R3	Pts.
1	(England) Kyle Ryde	Yamaha	5	4	C	2^{F}	2^{P}	5	2	4	2	2	7	11	3	2	1	1^{P}	2	4	2	2	1^{F}	2^{F}	1^{P F}	1^{P}	1^{F}	6	8^{F}	3^{P}	3	4	5	3	2	6	522
2	(England) Bradley Ray	Yamaha	1^{P F}	3^{P}	C	1^{P}	1	1	1^{P F}	1^{P F}	1^{P F}	1^{P F}	1^{P F}	2^{P}	1^{P}	Ret^{F}	4^{P}	8	3^{F}	2^{P}	1^{P F}	Ret^{P}	12	9	4	2^{F}	7^{P}	Ret^{P}	3	6	9	1^{F}	2^{P}	2^{P F}	3^{P}	2	502
3	(England) Leon Haslam	Ducati	3	1^{F}	C^{P}	6	5	4	4	5	3	13	8	7	24	9	7	9	8	6	8	4	7	8	7	6	4	2	5	2	2	2	3^{F}	7	Ret	DNS	362
4	(England) Scott Redding	Ducati										4	19	9	2^{F}	1^{P}	3	11	7	8	7	15	8	1^{P}	2	3	3	1	15	1^{F}	21	11	1	1	1^{F}	5^{P}	329.5
5	(England) Tommy Bridewell	Honda	6	10	C	Ret	8	7	3	3	4	5	3	13	6	Ret	WD	4	11	10	Ret	1	3	7	8	7	8	Ret	4	4	6	6	9	Ret	7	3	317
6	(England) Danny Kent	Yamaha	10	6	C	10	11	8	6	13	7	12	4	12	5	3	2^{F}	2	1	1^{F}	Ret	9	11	4	10	Ret	DNS	3	13	12				5	4	1^{F}	298
7	(Scotland) Rory Skinner	Ducati	11	11	C	5	4^{F}	3^{P}	Ret	2	5	3	2	1^{F}	8	6	6	10	9	12	9	10	Ret	3	3	5	2	14	2	8	WD	WD	WD	4	Ret	Ret	292
8	(England) Christian Iddon	Kawasaki	Ret	8	C	7	Ret	9	5	6	11	Ret	9	4	4	4	5	7	4	3	4	7	4	10	6	4	9	5^{F}	1^{P}	Ret	17	3	7	Ret	Ret	DNS	272
9	(England) Max Cook	Kawasaki	Ret	12	C	Ret	9	10	7	9	8	14	15	6	7	5	8	3^{F}	5^{P}	9	6	5	5	11	13	8	6	Ret	11	11	7	9	8	6	6	7	270
10	(England) Storm Stacey	BMW	4	5	C	Ret	Ret	Ret	10	10	9	7	5	5	DNS	14	11	13	14	15	5	6	6	13	14	12	12	18	9	5	5	5	4	11	9	4	252
11	(Australia) Josh Brookes	Honda	9	13	C	3	6	6	9	7	6	6	10	Ret	9	10	9	12	13	14	12	11	10	12	11	10	5	19	16	15	1^{F}	8^{P}	12	12	11	11	224
12	(England) Charlie Nesbitt	Honda	7	7	C	Ret	Ret	13	8	8	10	8	13	10	12	Ret	WD	6	10	5	Ret	8	9	Ret	12	9	10	4	6	7	10^{P}	7	10	8	5	Ret	220
13	(Northern Ireland) Glenn Irwin	Ducati	2	2	C	4	3	2^{F}	WD	WD	WD																										176
13	(Northern Ireland) Glenn Irwin	Yamaha																16	15	17	10	13	13	6	9	Ret	11	10	17	10	Ret	12	6	10	8	10	176
14	(Northern Ireland) Andrew Irwin	Honda	WD	WD	C	8	7	11	Ret	19	Ret	10	11	8	11	7	Ret	5	6	7	3	3^{F}	2^{P}	5	5	Ret	DNS										151
15	(England) Fraser Rogers	Honda	14	18	C	13	12	15	12	11	12	11	6	3	13	11	10	15	DNS	16	13	19	14	18	16	16	13	Ret	7	9	4	13	13	13	14	Ret	129
16	(England) Lee Jackson	Honda	8	9	C	14	17	Ret	Ret	12	13	9	12	14	10	8	Ret											17	14	13	20	Ret	11	9	12	8	99
17	(Scotland) John McPhee	Honda	15	15	C	9	10	12	11	14	14	15	16	Ret	17	16	Ret	18	16	18	11	12	17	Ret	17	Ret	14	8	10	14	22	17	17	17	13	12	67
18	(Australia) Billy McConnell	Honda	17	17	C	11	14	Ret	13	17	15	Ret	18	WD	16	15	13	14	12	13	16	14	16	Ret	Ret	11	Ret				8	10	14	DSQ	18	9	63
19	(England) Scott Swann	Honda	12	14	C	12	13	14	14	WD	WD	17	17	Ret	14	12	12	17	18	11	15	17	15	14	15	Ret	15	11	12	16	13	18	18	16	15	Ret	49.5
20	(England) Luke Hedger	Honda	18	Ret	C	15	16	17	Ret	15	17	16	14	15	15	13	14	19	17	Ret	14	16	DNS	17	20	14	Ret	9	WD	WD	12	16	Ret	Ret	10	Ret	35
21	(Netherlands) Jaimie van Sikkelerus	Honda	19	20	C	17	Ret	Ret	15	18	16	Ret	22	17	20	18	17	25	Ret	Ret	DNS	Ret	DNS	Ret	WD	WD	WD	7	18	18	16	19	20	Ret	19	13	13
22	(England) Peter Hickman	BMW	13	16	C	Ret	15	16																20	21	DNS	18	13	19	Ret	19	DNS	Ret	14	16	Ret	9.5
23	(England) Dean Harrison	Honda																													11	15	15	15	17	Ret	9
24	(England) Davey Todd	BMW	Ret	21	C	Ret	18	DNS	Ret	16	19	19	24	18	18	17	15	22	20	21	Ret	Ret	DNS	19	22	15	17	Ret	Ret	17	14	14	16	18	Ret	Ret	6
25	(England) Joe Talbot	Honda																						15	18	13	16										4
26	(Netherlands) Wayne Tessels	Kawasaki																										12	21	20							2
27	(Republic of Ireland) Richard Kerr	BMW	16	19	C	16	19	Ret	16	20	18	18	21	Ret	19	DNS	16	20	19	20	17	Ret	DNS	16	19	17	Ret	15	20	21	15	22	19	Ret	Ret	Ret	1.5
28	(South Africa) Blaze Baker	Honda	21	22	C	18	20	Ret		21	20	20	23	WD	21	19	18	21	DNS	WD	WD	WD	WD					16	22	19	18	21	21	DNS	21	Ret	0
29	(England) Jamie Davis	Honda	20	23	C	DNS	Ret	DNS				Ret	25	Ret	22	20	Ret	23	21	22	19	18	DNS	21	Ret	Ret	19	DNS	23	22	Ret	20	22	DNS	20	DNS	0
30	(Italy) Gabriele Giannini	Honda																Ret	DNS	19	18	Ret	DNS														0
31	(Scotland) Lewis Rollo	Aprilia										Ret	20	WD	23	WD	WD																				0
32	(England) Danny Webb	Aprilia																24	DNS	WD																	0
	(England) Tom Sykes	Aprilia				Ret	Ret	DNS	WD	WD	WD																										0
	(England) Kam Dixon	Yamaha																													WD	WD	WD				0
Pos.	Rider	Bike	R1	R2	R3	R1	R2	R3	R1	R2	R3	R1	R2	R3	R1	R2	R3	R1	R2	R3	R1	R2	R3	R1	R2	R3	R4	R1	R2	R3	R1	R2	R3	R1	R2	R3	Pts.
Pos.	Rider	Bike	OUL (England)			DON (England)			SNE (England)			KNO (Scotland)			BRH (England)			THR (England)			CAD (England)			DON (England)				ASS (Netherlands)			OUL (England)			BRH (England)			Pts.

Race key
Colour	Result
Gold	Winner
Silver	2nd place
Bronze	3rd place
Green	Points finish
Blue	Non-points finish
Blue	Non-classified finish (NC)
Purple	Retired (Ret)
Red	Did not qualify (DNQ)
Black	Disqualified (DSQ)
White	Did not start (DNS)
White	Withdrew (WD)
White	Race cancelled (C)
Blank	Did not practice (DNP)
Blank	Excluded (EX)
Blank	Did not arrive (DNA)
Blank	Did not enter (empty cell)
Annotation	Meaning
P	Pole position
F	Fastest lap
Rider key
Colour	Meaning
Light blue	Rookie rider

=== Manufacturers standings ===
Each manufacturer is awarded the same number of points as their best placed rider in each race.

Pos.	Constructor	OUL (England)		DON (England)			SNE (England)			KNO (Scotland)			BRH (England)			THR (England)			CAD (England)			DON (England)				ASS (Netherlands)			OUL (England)			BRH (England)			Pts
Pos.	Constructor	R1	R2	R1	R2	R3	R1	R2	R3	R1	R2	R3	R1	R2	R3	R1	R2	R3	R1	R2	R3	R1	R2	R3	R4	R1	R2	R3	R1	R2	R3	R1	R2	R3	Pts
1	(Japan) Yamaha	1	3	1	1	1	1	1	1	1	1	2	1	2	1	1	1	1	1	2	1	2	1	1	1	3	3	3	3	1	2	2	2	1	632
2	(Italy) Ducati	2	1	4	3	2	4	2	3	3	2	1	2	1	3	9	7	6	7	4	7	1	2	3	2	1	2	1	2	2	1	1	1	5	554.5
3	(Japan) Honda	6	7	3	6	6	3	3	4	5	3	3	6	7	9	4	6	5	3	1	2	5	5	7	5	4	4	4	1	6	9	8	5	3	438
4	(Japan) Kawasaki	Ret	8	7	9	9	5	6	8	14	9	4	4	4	5	3	4	3	4	5	4	10	6	4	6	5	1	11	7	3	7	6	6	7	369
5	(Germany) BMW	4	5	16	15	16	10	10	9	7	5	5	18	14	11	13	14	15	5	6	6	13	14	12	12	13	9	5	14	5	4	11	9	4	240.5
6	(Italy) Aprilia				Ret	Ret	DNS	WD	WD	WD	Ret	20	WD	23	WD	WD	24	DNS	WD																0
Pos.	Constructor	OUL (England)		DON (England)			SNE (England)			KNO (Scotland)			BRH (England)			THR (England)			CAD (England)			DON (England)				ASS (Netherlands)			OUL (England)			BRH (England)			Pts
Source:																																			Pts

=== Teams' Championship (Ceratizit Trophy) ===
The Teams' Championship, officially competing for the Ceratizit Trophy, awards points based on the performance of each team's single highest-finishing rider in each race. For multi-rider teams, only the points from the top-placed rider are counted toward the championship standings, ensuring equal opportunity for single-rider entries across the grid.

Pos.	Team	Constructor	OUL (England)		DON (England)			SNE (England)			KNO (Scotland)			BRH (England)			THR (England)			CAD (England)			DON (England)				ASS (Netherlands)			OUL (England)			BRH (England)			Pts
Pos.	Team	Constructor	R1	R2	R1	R2	R3	R1	R2	R3	R1	R2	R3	R1	R2	R3	R1	R2	R3	R1	R2	R3	R1	R2	R3	R4	R1	R2	R3	R1	R2	R3	R1	R2	R3	Pts
1	OMG Nitrous Competitions Racing Yamaha	Yamaha	5	4	2	2	5	2	4	2	2	7	11	3	2	1	1	2	4	2	2	1	2	1	1	1	6	8	3	3	4	5	3	2	6	522
2	Raceways Yamaha	Yamaha	1	3	1	1	1	1	1	1	1	1	2	1	Ret	4	8	3	2	1	Ret	12	9	4	2	7	Ret	3	6	9	1	2	2	3	2	502
3	Hager PBM Ducati	Ducati	2	2	4	3	2	WD	WD	WD	4	19	9	2	1	3	11	7	8	7	15	8	1	2	3	3	1	15	1	21	11	1	1	1	5	403.5
4	Honda Racing UK	Honda	6	10	8	7	7	3	3	4	5	3	8	6	7	Ret	4	6	7	3	1	2	5	5	7	8	Ret	4	4	6	6	9	15	7	3	371
5	AJN Steelstock Kawasaki	Kawasaki	Ret	8	7	9	9	5	6	8	14	9	4	4	4	5	3	4	3	4	5	4	10	6	4	6	5	1	11	7	3	7	6	6	7	369
6	Oxford Racing Products Ducati	Ducati	3	1	6	5	4	4	5	3	13	8	7	24	9	7	9	8	6	8	4	7	8	7	6	4	2	5	2	2	2	3	7	Ret	DNS	362
7	McAMS Racing Yamaha	Yamaha	10	6	10	11	8	6	13	7	12	4	12	5	3	2	2	1	1	Ret	9	11	4	10	Ret	DNS	3	13	12	WD	WD	WD	5	4	1	298
8	Cheshire Mouldings Ducati	Ducati	11	11	5	4	3	Ret	2	5	3	2	1	8	6	6	10	9	12	9	10	Ret	3	3	5	2	14	2	8	WD	WD	WD	4	Ret	Ret	292
9	Bathams AJN Racing BMW	BMW	4	5	Ret	Ret	Ret	10	10	9	7	5	5	DNS	14	11	13	14	15	5	6	6	13	14	12	12	18	9	5	5	5	4	11	9	4	252
10	DAO Racing Honda	Honda	8	9	3	6	6	9	7	6	6	10	14	9	8	9	12	13	14	12	11	10	12	11	10	5	17	14	13	1	8	11	9	11	8	250
11	MasterMac Honda	Honda	7	7	9	10	12	8	8	10	8	13	10	12	16	Ret	6	10	5	11	8	9	Ret	12	9	10	4	6	7	10	7	10	8	5	12	247
12	TAG Honda	Honda	14	18	13	12	15	12	11	12	11	6	3	13	11	10	15	Ret	16	13	19	14	18	16	16	13	7	7	9	4	13	13	13	14	13	141
13	C&L Fairburn Properties /Look Forward Racing	Honda	17	17	11	14	Ret	13	17	15	Ret	18	WD	16	15	13	14	12	13	16	14	16	Ret	Ret	11	Ret				8	10	14	DSQ	18	9	63
14	SendMyBag Racing by IWR Honda	Honda	12	14	12	13	14	14	WD	WD	17	17	Ret	14	12	12	17	18	11	15	17	15	14	15	Ret	15	11	12	16	13	18	18	16	15	Ret	49.5
15	Whitecliffe CDH Racing Honda	Honda	18	23	15	16	17	Ret	15	17	16	14	15	15	13	14	19	17	22	14	16	DNS	17	20	14	19	9	23	22	12	16	22	Ret	10	Ret	35
16	LEW 8TEN Racing BMW Motorrad	BMW	13	16	Ret	15	16	Ret	16	19	19	24	18	18	17	15	22	20	21	Ret	Ret	DNS	19	21	15	17	13	19	17	14	14	16	14	16	Ret	15.5
17	Druiijff Racing	Kawasaki																										12	21	20						2
18	ROKiT MLav Racing BMW Motorrad	BMW	16	19	16	19	Ret	16	20	18	18	21	Ret	19	DNS	16	20	19	20	17	Ret	DNS	16	19	17	Ret	15	20	21	15	22	19	Ret	Ret	Ret	1.5
19	NP Racing Honda	Honda	21	22	18	20	Ret		21	20	20	23	WD	21	19	18	21	DNS	WD	WD	WD	WD					16	22	19	18	21	21	DNS	21	Ret	0
20	Sencat IN Competition by Swan Racing Aprilia	Aprilia				Ret	Ret	DNS	WD	WD	WD	Ret	20	WD	23	WD	WD	24	DNS	WD																0
Pos.	Team	Constructor	OUL (England)		DON (England)			SNE (England)			KNO (Scotland)			BRH (England)			THR (England)			CAD (England)			DON (England)				ASS (Netherlands)			OUL (England)			BRH (England)			Pts
Source:																																				Pts
