= Hawk Racing =

British motorcycle racing team

(United Kingdom) Hawk Racing
- 2025 name: MasterMac Honda
- Base: Leicestershire, East Midlands, England
- Team principal/s: Steve Hicken
- Race riders: British Superbike Championship: 17. (Scotland) John McPhee 86. (England) Charlie Nesbitt; British Superstock Championship: 2. (England) Dan Brooks
- Motorcycle: Honda CBR1000RR
- Tyres: Pirelli
- Riders' Championships: 0 BSB

Hawk Racing is a motorcycle racing team headquartered in Leicestershire, UK. Founded by Stuart Hicken in 1996, the team is currently headed by Steve Hicken, Stuart's son. The team currently primarily races modified Honda Fireblade superbikes.

== Road Racing ==
Hawk Racing works closely with Michael Dunlop, a champion Superbike racer from Northern Ireland. Riding a Hawk Racing-modified Honda, Dunlop won the RST Superbike TT event in 2023. The relationship between the Hicken family and the Dunlop family goes back several years to when Stuart and Hawk first became associated with Michael's family of racing champions.

== British Championships ==
Besides collaborating with Dunlop during the Isle of Man TT, Hawk Racing backs two racers, John McPhee and Charlie Nesbitt, who compete on the Bennetts British Superbike Championship and EU Superbike circuit under the Hawk Racing banner.

In October 2024, Hawk Racing announced that MasterMac Surfacing would be sponsoring the team for the third consecutive year on the British Superbike circuit.

== British Superbike Championship ==
Year	Entrant	Bike	Pos.	Rider	DON (England)		BRH (England)		OUL (England)		SNE (England)		KNO (Scotland)		BRH (England)		THR (England)		CAD (England)		OUL (England)			ASS (Netherlands)		SIL (England)		BRH (England)			Pts
Year	Entrant	Bike	Pos.	Rider	R1	R2	R1	R2	R1	R2	R1	R2	R1	R2	R1	R2	R1	R2	R1	R2	R1	R2	R3	R1	R2	R1	R2	R1	R2	R3	Pts
The Championship Showdown
BSB Riders Cup
2015	Buildbase BMW	BMW S1000RR																													
2015	Buildbase BMW	BMW S1000RR	16 (8)	(England) Richard Cooper																											
2015	Buildbase BMW	BMW S1000RR	16 (8)	(England) Richard Cooper															8	7	7	8	7	6	4	12	6	DNS	DNS	DNS	80 (156)
2015	Buildbase BMW	BMW S1000RR	14	(England) Lee Jackson	13	13	18	23	15	10	Ret	19	11	11	12	11	DNS	9	12	11	8	11	13	12	17	11	9	5	6	Ret	101
2015	Buildbase BMW	BMW S1000RR	20	(Japan) Ryuichi Kiyonari	14	Ret	4	4	5	Ret	21	Ret	Ret	4	16	18	17	17	14	Ret	15	12	9			Ret	16				66

Year	Entrant	Bike	Pos.	Rider	SIL (England)		OUL (England)		BRH (England)		KNO (Scotland)		SNE (England)		THR (England)		BRH (England)		CAD (England)		OUL (England)			DON (England)		ASS (Netherlands)		BRH (England)			Pts
Year	Entrant	Bike	Pos.	Rider	R1	R2	R1	R2	R1	R2	R1	R2	R1	R2	R1	R2	R1	R2	R1	R2	R1	R2	R3	R1	R2	R1	R2	R1	R2	R3	Pts
The Championship Showdown
BSB Riders Cup
2016	Buildbase BMW	BMW S1000RR																													
2016	Buildbase BMW	BMW S1000RR	10	(England) Richard Cooper	12	11	9	1	4	2	6	7	Ret	11	8	Ret	8	5	8	Ret	6	12	6	6	5	8	10	Ret	Ret	15	193
2016	Buildbase BMW	BMW S1000RR	13	(England) Lee Jackson	8	7	14	13	15	12	13	15	10	15	Ret	10	5	6	Ret	11	10	Ret	8	12	11	15	13	8	13	Ret	108
2016	Buildbase BMW	BMW S1000RR		(Northern Ireland) Michael Dunlop	Ret	Ret	Ret	DNS																							0

Year	Entrant	Bike	Pos.	Rider	DON (England)		BRH (England)		OUL (England)		KNO (Scotland)		SNE (England)		BRH (England)		THR (England)		CAD (England)		SIL (England)			OUL (England)		ASS (Netherlands)		BRH (England)			Pts
Year	Entrant	Bike	Pos.	Rider	R1	R2	R1	R2	R1	R2	R1	R2	R1	R2	R1	R2	R1	R2	R1	R2	R1	R2	R3	R1	R2	R1	R2	R1	R2	R3	Pts
The Championship Showdown
BSB Riders Cup
2017	Buildbase Suzuki	Suzuki GSX-R 1000 R																													
2017	Buildbase Suzuki	Suzuki GSX-R 1000 R	11	(England) Bradley Ray	Ret	14	12	8	Ret	Ret	Ret	12	9	11	10	8	8	Ret	14	11	10	6	6	7	3	6	10	9	Ret	9	140
2017	Bennetts Suzuki	Suzuki GSX-R 1000 R	13	(France) Sylvain Guintoli	Ret	7	Ret	10	Ret	11	8	14	10	9	Ret	17	10	8	18	10	13	4	Ret	Ret	11	4	1	DNS	12	11	131
2017	Bennetts Suzuki	Suzuki GSX-R 1000 R	19	(Scotland) Taylor Mackenzie	Ret	Ret	15	14	18	15	5	11	Ret	Ret	Ret	15	13	DNS	15	15	7	Ret	DNS			DNS	DNS				35
2017	Buildbase Suzuki	Suzuki GSX-R 1000 R		(Northern Ireland) Michael Dunlop	16	17			19	Ret							Ret	DNS													0

Year	Entrant	Bike	Pos.	Rider	DON (England)		BRH (England)		OUL (England)		SNE (England)		KNO (Scotland)		BRH (England)		THR (England)		CAD (England)		SIL (England)			OUL (England)		ASS (Netherlands)		BRH (England)			Pts
Year	Entrant	Bike	Pos.	Rider	R1	R2	R1	R2	R1	R2	R1	R2	R1	R2	R1	R2	R1	R2	R1	R2	R1	R2	R3	R1	R2	R1	R2	R1	R2	R3	Pts
The Championship Showdown
2018	Buildbase Suzuki	Suzuki GSX-R 1000 R																													
2018	Buildbase Suzuki	Suzuki GSX-R 1000 R	6	(England) Bradley Ray	1	1	2	7	4	7	Ret	Ret	5	Ret	13	16	Ret	12	2	2	Ret	14	7	11	Ret	17	7	11	8	11	551
2018	Buildbase Suzuki	Suzuki GSX-R 1000 R	BSB Riders Cup																												
2018	Buildbase Suzuki	Suzuki GSX-R 1000 R	12	(England) Richard Cooper	16	13	Ret	Ret	10	9	10	7	9	7	7	Ret	Ret	14	11	9	Ret	10	8	13	Ret	12	5	Ret	4	1	140

Year	Entrant	Bike	Pos.	Rider	SIL (England)		OUL (England)		DON (England)			BRH (England)		KNO (Scotland)		SNE (England)		THR (England)		CAD (England)		OUL (England)			ASS (Netherlands)		DON (England)		BRH (England)			Pts
Year	Entrant	Bike	Pos.	Rider	R1	R2	R1	R2	R1	R2	R3	R1	R2	R1	R2	R1	R2	R1	R2	R1	R2	R1	R2	R3	R1	R2	R1	R2	R1	R2	R3	Pts
The Championship Showdown
2019	Buildbase Suzuki	Suzuki GSX-R 1000 R																														
2019	Buildbase Suzuki	Suzuki GSX-R 1000 R	11	(England) Bradley Ray	16	10	14	12	17	13	9	17	Ret	6	Ret	13	13	12	13	Ret	Ret	2	4	2	9	10	Ret	6	15	14	14	126
2019	Buildbase Suzuki	Suzuki GSX-R 1000 R	13	(England) Luke Stapleford	7	5	19	16	12	15	10	13	17	9	Ret	Ret	15	14	12	11	8	14	12	12	4	5	13	14	14	16	17	102
2019	Buildbase Suzuki	Suzuki GSX-R 1000 R	31	(England) Richard Cooper																					13	Ret						3

Year	Entrant	Bike	Pos.	Rider	DON (England)			SNE (England)			SIL (England)			OUL (England)			DON (England)			BRH (England)			Pts
Year	Entrant	Bike	Pos.	Rider	R1	R2	R3	R1	R2	R3	R1	R2	R3	R1	R2	R3	R1	R2	R3	R1	R2	R3	
2020	Buildbase Suzuki	Suzuki GSX-R 1000 R																					
2020	Buildbase Suzuki	Suzuki GSX-R 1000 R	9	(England) Kyle Ryde	Ret	4	7	10	6	10	2	1	1	Ret	13	13	8	Ret	14	14	11	Ret	137
2020	Buildbase Suzuki	Suzuki GSX-R 1000 R	12	(England) Gino Rea																			85 (89)
2020	Buildbase Suzuki	Suzuki GSX-R 1000 R	12	(England) Gino Rea				11	12	13	Ret	12	14	10	12	12	6	4	5	10	9	10	85 (89)
2020	Buildbase Suzuki	Suzuki GSX-R 1000 R	19	(Northern Ireland) Keith Farmer	DNS	DNS	DNS							15	Ret	18	13	11	15				10

Year	Entrant	Bike	Pos.	Rider	OUL (England)			KNO (Scotland)			BRH (England)			THR (England)			DON (England)			CAD (England)			SNE (England)			SIL (England)			OUL (England)			DON (England)			BRH (England)			Pts
Year	Entrant	Bike	Pos.	Rider	R1	R2	R3	R1	R2	R3	R1	R2	R3	R1	R2	R3	R1	R2	R3	R1	R2	R3	R1	R2	R3	R1	R2	R3	R1	R2	R3	R1	R2	R3	R1	R2	R3	Pts
The Championship Showdown
2021	Buildbase Suzuki	Suzuki GSX-R 1000 R																																				
2021	Buildbase Suzuki	Suzuki GSX-R 1000 R	11	(England) Gino Rea	11	13	11	13	10	11	Ret	10	DNS	8	10	11	15	Ret	10	Ret	Ret	11	Ret	5	4	6	6	Ret	Ret	10	9	1	4	1	12	8	10	202
2021	Buildbase Suzuki	Suzuki GSX-R 1000 R	18	(England) Danny Kent	Ret	14	Ret	Ret	Ret	14	10	Ret	10	6	9	3	16	Ret	DNS																			49
2021	Buildbase Suzuki	Suzuki GSX-R 1000 R	23	(England) Luke Stapleford																			17	19	14	10	14	DNS										10
2021	Buildbase Suzuki	Suzuki GSX-R 1000 R	25	(England) Tim Neave																15	11	15																7
2021	Buildbase Suzuki	Suzuki GSX-R 1000 R	27	(Japan) Naomichi Uramoto																												Ret	13	13				6
2021	Buildbase Suzuki	Suzuki GSX-R 1000 R	31	(Northern Ireland) Michael Dunlop																									19	14	17							2
2021	Buildbase Suzuki	Suzuki GSX-R 1000 R		(England) Leon Jeacock																															20	18	19	0

Year	Entrant	Bike	Pos.	Rider	SIL (England)			OUL (England)			DON (England)			KNO (Scotland)			BRH (England)			THR (England)			CAD (England)			SNE (England)			OUL (England)			DON (England)			BRH (England)			Pts
Year	Entrant	Bike	Pos.	Rider	R1	R2	R3	R1	R2	R3	R1	R2	R3	R1	R2	R3	R1	R2	R3	R1	R2	R3	R1	R2	R3	R1	R2	R3	R1	R2	R3	R1	R2	R3	R1	R2	R3	Pts
The Championship Showdown
2022	Buildbase Suzuki	Suzuki GSX-R 1000 R																																				
2022	Buildbase Suzuki	Suzuki GSX-R 1000 R	15	(England) Christian Iddon	8	10	11	7	7	14	6	7	6	Ret	DNS	DNS	10	Ret	11	12	11	11	18	12	Ret	4	Ret	Ret	7	DNS	DNS				Ret	7	9	135
2022	Buildbase Suzuki	Suzuki GSX-R 1000 R	16	(England) Danny Kent	17	18	15	21	19	Ret	DNS	DNS	DNS	19	14	Ret	12	9	Ret	Ret	22	15	15	16	14	10	Ret	12	12	12	10	17	14	9	8	6	8	77
2022	Buildbase Suzuki	Suzuki GSX-R 1000 R	21	(England) Charlie Nesbitt																												19	13	13	11	8	12	23

Year	Entrant	Bike	Pos.	Rider	SIL (England)			OUL (England)			DON (England)			KNO (Scotland)			SNE (England)			BRH (England)			THR (England)			CAD (England)			OUL (England)			DON (England)			BRH (England)			Pts
Year	Entrant	Bike	Pos.	Rider	R1	R2	R3	R1	R2	R3	R1	R2	R3	R1	R2	R3	R1	R2	R3	R1	R2	R3	R1	R2	R3	R1	R2	R3	R1	R2	R3	R1	R2	R3	R1	R2	R3	Pts
2023		Honda CBR1000RR-R																																				
2023	MasterMac by Hawk Racing Honda	Honda CBR1000RR-R	11	(England) Charlie Nesbitt	12	Ret	17	11	Ret	14	10	6	9	Ret	Ret	Ret	9	12	11	11	11	9	2	3	3	Ret	Ret	Ret	10	12	12	20	7	4	Ret	11	10	174.5
2023	Crendon Honda by Hawk Racing	Honda CBR1000RR-R	26	(England) Josh Owens	24	15	16	16	Ret	DNS	Ret	14	DSQ	13	Ret	Ret	18	15	14	15	Ret	Ret	WD	WD	WD													9.5
2023	Hawk Racing (Rd 2) & Crendon Honda by Hawk Racing	Honda CBR1000RR-R		(Northern Ireland) Michael Dunlop				Ret	Ret	DNS																			19	Ret	Ret	21	Ret	Ret				0

Year	Entrant	Bike	Pos.	Rider	NAV (Spain)		OUL (England)			DON (England)			KNO (Scotland)			SNE (England)			BRH (England)			THR (England)			CAD (England)			OUL (England)			DON (England)			BRH (England)			Pts
Year	Entrant	Bike	Pos.	Rider	R1	R2	R1	R2	R3	R1	R2	R3	R1	R2	R3	R1	R2	R3	R1	R2	R3	R1	R2	R3	R1	R2	R3	R1	R2	R3	R1	R2	R3	R1	R2	R3	Pts
2024	MasterMac Honda	Honda CBR1000RR-R	7	(England) Lee Jackson	14	12	14	11	11	7	12	8	8	9	10	DNS	12	11	8	7	6	7	11	7	2	3	3	3	7	7	8	7	9	13	12	Ret	251
2024	MasterMac Honda	Honda CBR1000RR-R	11	(England) Charlie Nesbitt	9	9	11	13	13	9	7	11	9	5	8	Ret	9	10	Ret	10	9	Ret	12	5	3	4	4	Ret	Ret	Ret	6	5	7	Ret	9	8	223

== Video game ==
Following a Trend in the early 2000s the team had a Sports Video Game Title as Hawk Kawasaki Racing / Hawk Superbike Racing on the PlayStation 2 with Peter Hickman on the signature green Kawasaki racing motorcycle on the cover.
