= Glenn Irwin =

Northern Irish motorcycle racer

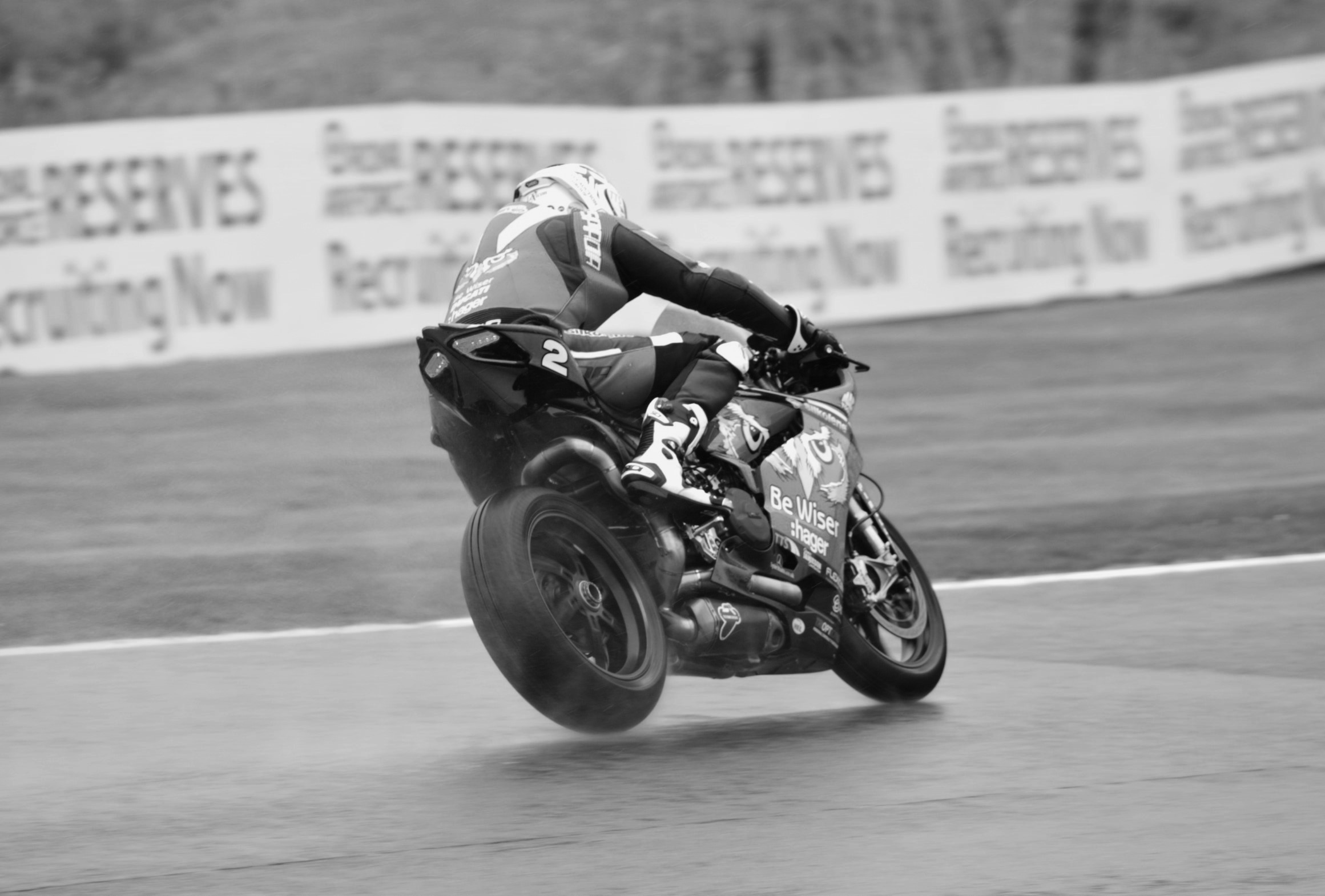
- Irwin at Oulton Park in 2016
- Nationality: Northern Irish
- Born: 21 March 1990 (age 36); Carrickfergus, Northern Ireland
- Current team: Nitrous Competitions OMG Racing
- Bike number: 2
Motorcycle racing career statistics
British Superbike Championship
Active years	2016–2024
Manufacturers	Ducati, BMW, Kawasaki, Honda
Championships	0
2024 championship position	3rd (382 pts)
Starts / Wins / Podiums / Poles / F. laps / Points; 242 / 27 / 62 / 14 / 11 / 4235.5

Glenn Irwin (born 21 March 1990 in Carrickfergus, Northern Ireland) is a professional motorcycle road racer. In 2023, he raced for the Paul Bird Motorsport Ducati team in the British Superbike Championship, losing the championship by half-a-point, and in road racing events such as the North West 200 aboard a Ducati Panigale V4 R.

Irwin was confirmed in March 2024 to be continuing with his former team, renamed as PBM Racing following the death of Paul Bird, as a single-rider entry in British Superbikes.

Following disagreement with PBM over his return from injury and their recruitment of Scott Reading while Irwin was out of action, Irwin moved to Nitrous Competitions OMG Racing mid-season in 2025 as team mate to reigning champion Kyle Ryde.

Irwin has experienced success on both short circuits and the roads, with runner-up spots in the 2022 British Superbike Championship and again in 2023 by a half-point to teammate Tommy Bridewell.

Irwin has also tallied eleven wins at the North West 200, all in the superbike class, including doubles at the 2018 and 2022 meetings. Irwin also holds the lap record for the fastest newcomer at the Isle of Man TT, set in 2022 with a speed of 129.85 mph.

Irwin is the brother of racer Andrew Irwin.

== Career ==
Irwin secured his first title in 2008 by taking the Irish Clubman 125 championship, which was backed up the following year by victory in the Ulster Supersport Championship and Supersport Cup. The following year, he made his debut in the British Championships, with a runners up spot in the 2011 National Superstock 600 Championship to fellow Northern Irishman Keith Farmer seeing him secure his status as top rookie in the championship that year.

2012 saw Irwin compete in the 2012 British Supersport Championship where he finished the season in ninth place, winning the privateer's championship over Luke Jones. He would return the following year in the Supersport Championship for the Mar-Train Yamaha Team alongside Stuart Easton, where he would again finish the season in ninth place. For 2014, Irwin would return in the Supersport Championship but for a different team and manufacturer, as the off-season had seen him switch to the Gearlink Kawasaki team alongside Ben Wilson. His season got off to the best possible start by taking his maiden victory in British Supersport at the opening round on the Brands Hatch Indy circuit. This would be added to with four further victories across the remainder of the season, seeing him end the season in fourth place. He extended his stay with the Gearlink Kawasaki outfit during the off-season for the 2015 season, where he would score another fourth-place finish, taking three victories and ten podiums on his way.

2016 would see Irwin step up to the British Superbike Championship with PBM Ducati, where he would race alongside Shane Byrne. He would finish the season in 12th place, picking up a podium apiece at Thruxton and Brands Hatch as teammate Byrne won the title. The 2016 season would also see him make his debut at the Macau Grand Prix, where a technical problem cost him a potential podium finish. Irwin returned with PBM in 2017 after signing a new two-year deal with the Cumbrian team, where he would take his maiden win in British Superbike with victory in the first race of the Silverstone round, ending the season in 12th place once more. He made his debut appearance at the North West 200 that year, where he would take a debut win in the superbike class ahead of Alastair Seeley by just 0.172 seconds. He was also victorious at the Macau Grand Prix, taking victory over Peter Hickman. 2018 would see a sharp upturn in form for Irwin in British Superbikes, as top-ten finishes in all but four of the races that year - including a win at the Brands Hatch finale - saw him make the showdown for the first time and ultimately take third place in the standings behind Jake Dixon and champion Leon Haslam. He would also experience success at that year's North West 200, taking a double victory in the superbike class. Irwin departed the PBM team upon the expiry of his contract at the end of the 2018 season.

Irwin made the switch to Kawasaki machinery ahead of the 2019 season, where he would line up for the JG Speedfit Kawasaki team. The switch failed to repeat the previous year's successes, with Irwin and JG Speedfit Kawasaki splitting by mutual consent in the aftermath of the Snetterton round, which he had missed with a virus. It was subsequently announced that Irwin had signed a deal to race with the Tyco BMW outfit alongside Christian Iddon to replaced the injured Farmer. However, he would fail to see out the year with the team, as it was announced after the Assen round that Tyco BMW had parted company with Irwin. The year did bring some success, as he took another win at the North West 200 with a final lap overtake on Quattro Plant Wicked Coatings Kawasaki teammate James Hillier.

For 2020, Irwin would line up alongside brother Andrew Irwin for the Honda Racing Team, where he was scheduled to compete in his first Isle of Man TT, which was subsequently cancelled due to the COVID-19 pandemic. He enjoyed a much better season than the previous, with a number of top-five finishes seeing him collect fourth place in the standings as well as a third win in British Superbikes at Snetterton. Irwin would make the showdown once again in 2021, taking his fourth win in the series in the series at Silverstone on his way to eighth in the standings. Irwin would return in 2022 with Honda where he would enjoy by far his most successful season to date in British Superbikes, taking second place in the standings including an opening weekend hat-trick of victories at Silverstone along with a double at the Brands Hatch finale. 2022 also saw a return to road racing action, as he took another double victory in the superbike class at the North West 200. He also made his long-awaited TT debut, with a best finish of eighth in the Superbike TT. Irwin also clocked the lap record for a newcomer with an average lap speed of 129.85 mph

Irwin would return to the PBM Ducati outfit ahead of the 2023 season, where he would team up with Tommy Bridewell.

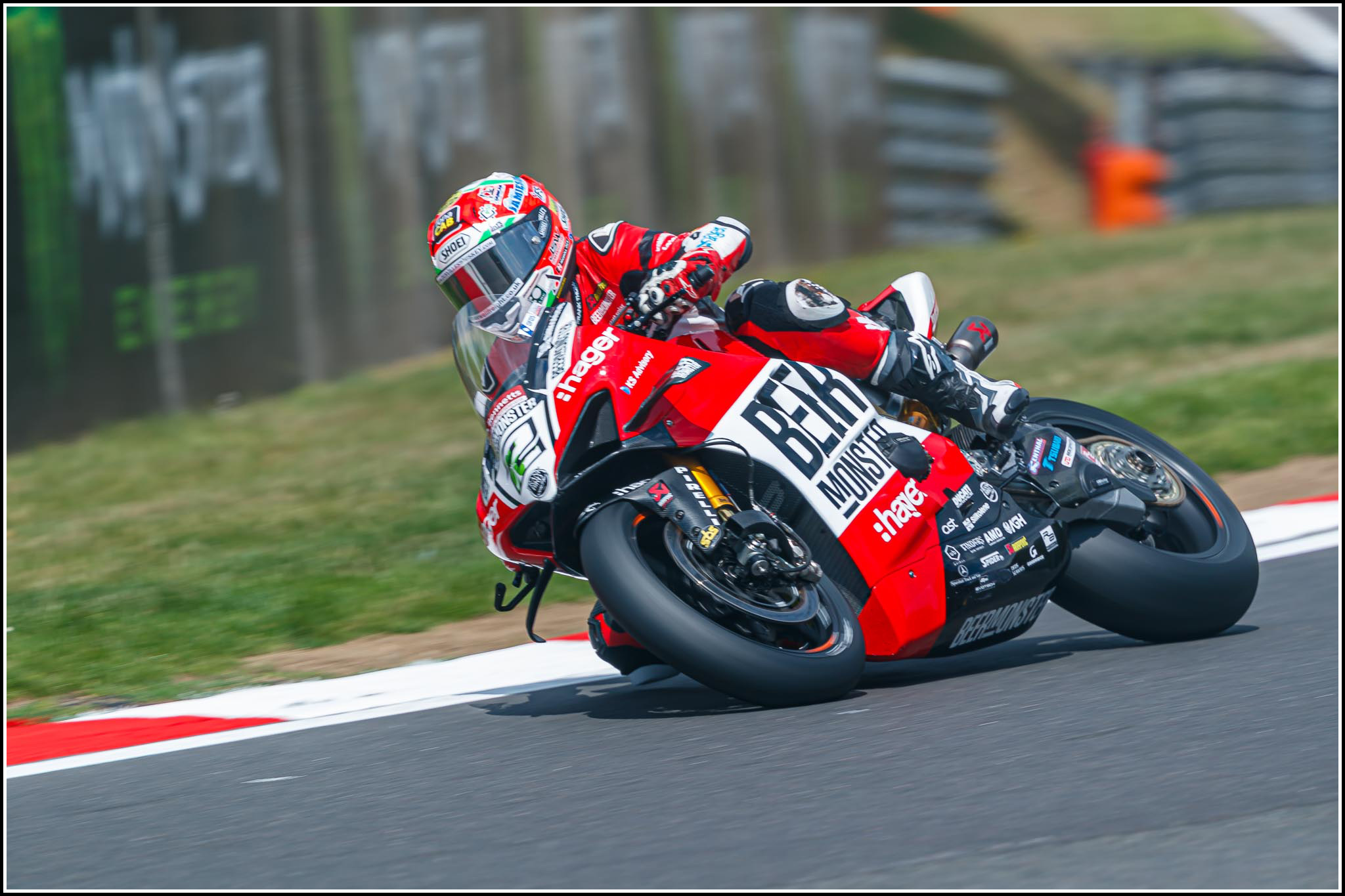
Irwin riding for BeerMonster Ducati at Brands Hatch in 2023

On 8 July 2023, Irwin finished in second place in the final British Superbike race at Snetterton, narrowly missing out on a win to his teammate Tommy Bridewell, who secured a hat-trick in the competition.

On 5 August 2025, Irwin parted ways with the Hager PBM Ducati team by mutual consent following a disagreement over his return to racing after an injury sustained at Snetterton in June, and subsequently joined Nitrous Competitions OMG Racing for the remainder of the British Superbike Championship season. The following day, Irwin stated that he had been declared orthopaedically fit and had passed all required medical examinations, adding that he was “a bit hurt” by the team’s decision and felt his loyalty had not been reciprocated.

== Career statistics ==
2010 - NC, European Superstock 600 Championship, Kawasaki ZX-6R
2011 - NC, European Superstock 600 Championship, Kawasaki ZX-6R

=== National Superstock 600 Championship ===
Year	Bike	1	2	3	4	5	6	7	8	9	10	11	12	13	Pos	Pts
2011	Kawasaki	BRH; 6	OUL; Ret	CRO; 7	THR; Ret	**KNO**; 2	SNE; 1	OUL; C	BRH; Ret	CAD; Ret	DON; 2	DON; 1	**SIL**; 2	**BRH**; 1	**2nd**	**154**

=== European Superstock 600 ===
==== Races by year ====
(key) (Races in bold indicate pole position, races in italics indicate fastest lap)

Year	Bike	1	2	3	4	5	6	7	8	9	10	Pos	Pts
2010	Kawasaki	POR	VAL	ASS	MNZ	MIS	BRN	SIL	NÜR	IMO; Ret	MAG	NC	0
2011	Kawasaki	ASS	MNZ	MIS	ARA	BRN	SIL	NÜR	IMO	MAG	POR; 21	NC	0

=== British Supersport Championship ===
(key) (Races in bold indicate pole position; races in italics indicate fastest lap)

Year	Bike	1	2	3	4	5	6	7	8	9	10	11	12	13	14	15	16	17	18	19	20	21	22	23	24	Pos	Pts
2012	Yamaha	BHI; 5	BHI; Ret	THR; 12	THR; 7	OUL; 10	OUL; 10	SNE; 9	SNE; 6	KNO; 10	KNO; 21	OUL; 6	OUL; 10	BHGP; Ret	BHGP; 11	CAD; 9	CAD; 9	DON; 4	DON; 5	ASS; 8	ASS; 6	SIL; 7	SIL; Ret	BRH; 8	BRH; Ret	9th	153
2015	Kawasaki	DON; 3	DON; 4	BRH; 2	BRH; 4	OUL; 2	OUL; 4	SNE; 5	SNE; 1	KNO; 1	KNO; 3	BRH; Ret	BRH; 8	THR; 6	THR; 4	CAD; 5	CAD; 7	OUL; Ret	OUL; 4	ASS; 5	ASS; 3	SIL; 3	SIL; 1	BRH; Ret	BRH; 3	4th	320

=== British Superbike Championship ===
(key) (Races in bold indicate pole position, races in italics indicate fastest lap)

Year	Make	1			2			3			4			5			6			7			8			9			10			11			12			Pos	Pts
Year	Make	R1	R2	R3	R1	R2	R3	R1	R2	R3	R1	R2	R3	R1	R2	R3	R1	R2	R3	R1	R2	R3	R1	R2	R3	R1	R2	R3	R1	R2	R3	R1	R2	R3	R1	R2	R3	Pos	Pts
2016	Ducati	SIL; 14	SIL; 13		OUL; 13	OUL; 7		BHI; 13	BHI; Ret		KNO; 11	KNO; Ret		SNE; Ret	SNE; 7		THR; 11	THR; 3		BHGP; Ret	BHGP; 4		CAD; 5	CAD; 7		OUL; Ret	OUL; 9	OUL; 11	DON; 13	DON; 10		ASS; 11	ASS; 12		BHGP; 3	BHGP; 7	BHGP; 17	12th	143
2017	Ducati	DON; 6	DON; 3		BHI; 6	BHI; Ret		OUL; 9	OUL; 2		KNO; DNS	KNO; DNS		SNE	SNE		BHGP; 16	BHGP; 14		THR; 20	THR; 11		CAD; 11	CAD; 9		SIL; 1	SIL; Ret	SIL; Ret	OUL; 11	OUL; 12		ASS; 14	ASS; 14		BHGP; Ret	BHGP; 7	BHGP; 13	12th	132
2018	Ducati	DON; 6	DON; 7		BHI; 7	BHI; 2		OUL; Ret	OUL; 5		SNE; 2	**SNE**; Ret		KNO; 4	KNO; 4		**BHGP**; 2	BHGP; 2		**THR**; 5	THR; 9		CAD; 4	CAD; 5		SIL; 2	SIL; 3	SIL; 4	OUL; 12	OUL; 6		ASS; 5	ASS; 4		BHGP; 1	BHGP; 7	BHGP; Ret	3rd	588
2019	Kawasaki	SIL; Ret	SIL; 11		OUL; Ret	OUL; 22		DON; 9	DON; Ret	DON; 14	BRH; 10	BRH; 10		KNO; 10	KNO; 9		SNE	SNE																				15th	84
2019	BMW																			THR; 11	THR; DNS		CAD; 8	CAD; 6		OUL; 7	OUL; 15	OUL; 5	ASS; Ret	ASS; 15		DON	DON		BHGP	BHGP	BHGP	15th	84
2020	Honda	DON; 2	DON; 2	DON; 2	SNE; 4	**SNE**; 2	SNE; 1	SIL; 4	SIL; 4	SIL; 4	OUL; 5	OUL; Ret	OUL; 6	DON; Ret	DON; 7	DON; 2	BRH; 6	BRH; 12	BRH; 11																			4th	226
2021	Honda	OUL; 6	OUL; 9	OUL; 10	KNO; 12	KNO; 11	KNO; Ret	BHGP; 11	BHGP; 8	BHGP; 6	THR; Ret	THR; 3	THR; 6	DON; 2	DON; Ret	DON; 2	**CAD**; 4	CAD; 6	CAD; 6	**SNE**; Ret	SNE; 14	SNE; 11	SIL; 1	SIL; 13	SIL; 9	OUL; 8	OUL; Ret	OUL; 7	DON; Ret	DON; 10	DON; 10	BHGP; 9	BHGP; 9	BHGP; Ret				8th	1055
2022	Honda	**SIL**; 1	SIL; 1	SIL; 1	OUL; 11	OUL; 9	OUL; 7	DON; 5	DON; Ret	DON; Ret	KNO; 7	KNO; 8	KNO; 6	BRH; Ret	BRH; 10	BRH; 3	THR; 4	THR; 6	THR; 4	CAD; 9	CAD; 9	CAD; 8	SNE; 9	SNE; 4	SNE; 4	OUL; 4	OUL; 4	**OUL**; 2	DON; 5	DON; 3	DON; 3	**BRH**; 1	**BRH**; 3	**BRH**; 1				2nd	1171
2023	Ducati	SIL; 5	SIL; 3	SIL; 1	OUL; 3	OUL; 2	**OUL**; 1	DON; 5	DON; Ret	DON; 3	**KNO**; 1	KNO; Ret	KNO; 1	SNE; 4	SNE; 4	SNE; 2	BRH; 9	BRH; 4	BRH; 2	THR; 9	THR; 13	THR; 13	CAD; 1	CAD; 1	CAD; 2	OUL; 1	OUL; 1	OUL; 2	DON; 23	DON; Ret	DON; Ret	BRH; 4	BRH; 1	BRH; 1				2nd	454.5
2024	Ducati	NAV; 4	NAV; 8		OUL; 1	**OUL**; 1	OUL; 1	DON; 5	DON; 1	DON; 4	KNO; Ret	KNO; 8	KNO; 9	SNE; 5	SNE; 1	**SNE**; 1	BRH; 2	BRH; 2	BRH; 4	THR; 14	THR; DNS	THR; 15	CAD; 5	CAD; 5	CAD; 5	OUL; 2	OUL; 1	**OUL**; 9	DON; 3	DON; 1	**DON**; 4	BRH; Ret	BRH; 10	BRH; 7				3rd	382
2025	Ducati	OUL; 2	OUL; 2	OUL; C	DON; 4	DON; 3	DON; 2	SNE	SNE	SNE	KNO	KNO	KNO	BRH	BRH	BRH	THR	THR	THR	CAD	CAD	CAD	DON	DON	DON	ASS	ASS	ASS	OUL	OUL	OUL	BRH	BRH	BRH				2nd*	74*

* Season still in progress.
