= 2014 British Supersport Championship =

The 2014 British Supersport season was the 27th British Supersport Championship season.

== Race calendar and results ==
The 2014 MCE Insurance British Superbike Championship calendar was announced on 10 October 2013 by MSVR.

2014 Calendar
Round		Circuit	Date	Pole position	Fastest lap	Winning rider	Winning team
1	R1	(England) Brands Hatch Indy	20 April	(Northern Ireland) Glenn Irwin	(England) Luke Jones	(Northern Ireland) Glenn Irwin	Gearlink Kawasaki
1	R2	(England) Brands Hatch Indy	21 April		(Northern Ireland) Alastair Seeley	(Northern Ireland) Alastair Seeley	Mar-Train Yamaha Racing
2	R1	(England) Oulton Park	4 May	(Northern Ireland) Alastair Seeley	(Northern Ireland) Alastair Seeley	(Australia) Billy McConnell	Smiths Triumph
2	R2	(England) Oulton Park	5 May		(Northern Ireland) Alastair Seeley	(Australia) Billy McConnell	Smiths Triumph
3	R1	(England) Snetterton 300	14 June	(Australia) Billy McConnell	(England) Graeme Gowland	(England) Graeme Gowland	Smiths Triumph
3	R2	(England) Snetterton 300	15 June		(England) Luke Stapleford	(England) Graeme Gowland	Smiths Triumph
4	R1	(Scotland) Knockhill	29 June	(England) Graeme Gowland	(England) Luke Stapleford	(England) Graeme Gowland	Smiths Triumph
4	R2	(Scotland) Knockhill	30 June		(England) Luke Mossey	(England) Luke Mossey	Techcare/Profile Triumph
5	R1	(England) Brands Hatch GP	19 July	(England) Jake Dixon	(England) Luke Jones	(Northern Ireland) Alastair Seeley	Mar-Train Yamaha Racing
5	R2	(England) Brands Hatch GP	20 July		(England) Graeme Gowland	(Northern Ireland) Alastair Seeley	Mar-Train Yamaha Racing
6	R1	(England) Thruxton	2 August	(England) Luke Jones	(England) Luke Mossey	(Northern Ireland) Alastair Seeley	Mar-Train Yamaha Racing
6	R2	(England) Thruxton	3 August		(Northern Ireland) Glenn Irwin	(England) Graeme Gowland	Smiths Triumph
7	R1	(England) Oulton Park	9 August	(England) Graeme Gowland	(England) Graeme Gowland	(Australia) Billy McConnell	Smiths Triumph
7	R2	(England) Oulton Park	10 August		(Northern Ireland) Alastair Seeley	(Northern Ireland) Alastair Seeley	Mar-Train Yamaha Racing
8	R1	(England) Cadwell Park	24 August	(England) Luke Stapleford	(Australia) Billy McConnell	(Australia) Billy McConnell	Smiths Triumph
8	R2	(England) Cadwell Park	25 August		(England) Jake Dixon	(Northern Ireland) Glenn Irwin	Gearlink Kawasaki
9	R1	(England) Donington Park	6 September	(England) Luke Mossey	(England) Graeme Gowland	(Northern Ireland) Glenn Irwin	Gearlink Kawasaki
9	R2	(England) Donington Park	7 September		(Australia) Billy McConnell	(England) Luke Mossey	Techcare/Profile Triumph
10	R1	(Netherlands) TT Circuit Assen	20 September	(England) Graeme Gowland	(England) Sam Hornsey	(Northern Ireland) Alastair Seeley	Mar-Train Yamaha Racing
10	R2	(Netherlands) TT Circuit Assen	21 September		(England) Luke Stapleford	(Australia) Billy McConnell	Smiths Triumph
11	R1	(England) Silverstone Arena GP	4 October	(Northern Ireland) Glenn Irwin	(Northern Ireland) Alastair Seeley	(Northern Ireland) Alastair Seeley	Mar-Train Yamaha Racing
11	R2	(England) Silverstone Arena GP	5 October		(England) Luke Stapleford	(Northern Ireland) Glenn Irwin	Gearlink Kawasaki
12	R1	(England) Brands Hatch GP	18 October	(Northern Ireland) Alastair Seeley	(England) Luke Jones	(Northern Ireland) Glenn Irwin	Gearlink Kawasaki
12	R2	(England) Brands Hatch GP	19 October		(England) Luke Stapleford	(Northern Ireland) Alastair Seeley	Mar-Train Yamaha Racing

== Championship standings ==
Championship standings
Position	Rider	Team	Points
1	Billy McConnell	Smiths Triumph	364
2	Alastair Seeley	Mar-Train Yamaha Racing	360
3	Graeme Gowland	Smiths Triumph	341
4	Glenn Irwin	Gearlink Kawasaki	315
5	Luke Jones	Acumen Industrial Services	279
6	Luke Stapleford	Profile Racing	262
7	Luke Mossey	Techcare/Profile Triumph	244
8	Jake Dixon	Appleyard Macadam & Doodson	162
9	James Rispoli	Team Traction Control Yamaha	150
10	Taylor Mackenzie	Tyco Suzuki	148
