= 2017 British Superbike Championship =

British motorcycle racing season

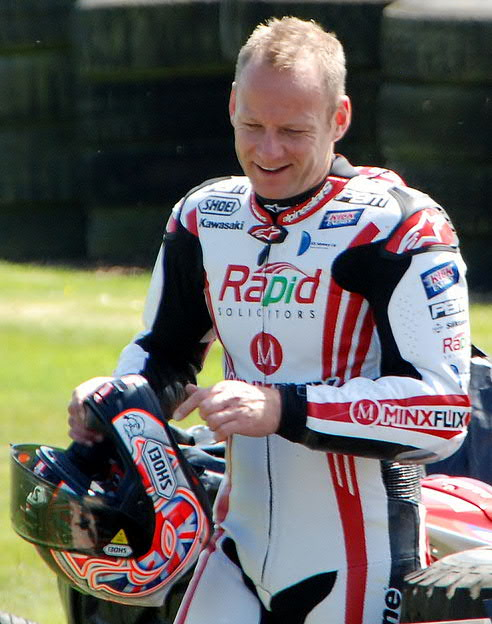
Shane Byrne successfully defended his championship.

The 2017 British Superbike Championship season was the 30th British Superbike Championship season. It began at Donington on 31 March and ended at the Brands Hatch GP circuit on 15 October. Shane Byrne started the season as the defending Champion, having secured his fifth overall title in the British Superbike Championship. Byrne repeated on his previous years title and won for a record 6th time the BSB Championship on the Be Wiser Ducati.

== Teams and riders ==
Team	Constructor	No.	Rider	Rounds
Be Wiser Ducati Racing Team	Ducati	2	(Northern Ireland) Glenn Irwin	1–4, 6–12
Be Wiser Ducati Racing Team	Ducati	67	(England) Shane Byrne	All
Quattro Plant FS-3 Racing Kawasaki	Kawasaki	3	(Australia) Billy McConnell	1–7
Quattro Plant FS-3 Racing Kawasaki	Kawasaki	81	(England) Luke Stapleford	9
Quattro Plant FS-3 Racing Kawasaki	Kawasaki	83	(England) Danny Buchan	11
Quattro Plant FS-3 Racing Kawasaki	Kawasaki	97	(England) Kyle Ryde	12
Honda Racing	Honda	4	(England) Dan Linfoot	All
Honda Racing	Honda	22	(Australia) Jason O'Halloran	All
Gearlink Kawasaki	Kawasaki	5	(England) James Westmoreland	All
Bennetts Suzuki	Suzuki	6	(Scotland) Taylor Mackenzie	1–9, 11
Bennetts Suzuki	Suzuki	47	(England) Richard Cooper	11
Bennetts Suzuki	Suzuki	47	(England) Richard Cooper	12
Bennetts Suzuki	Suzuki	50	(France) Sylvain Guintoli	All
McAMS Yamaha	Yamaha	7	(Northern Ireland) Michael Laverty	All
McAMS Yamaha	Yamaha	77	(England) James Ellison	All
Anvil Hire TAG Racing	Yamaha	8	(England) Shaun Winfield	All
Anvil Hire TAG Racing	Yamaha	25	(Australia) Josh Brookes	All
Silicone Engineering Racing	Kawasaki	9	(England) Dean Harrison	9–12
Tyco BMW Motorrad	BMW	10	(Northern Ireland) Josh Elliott	5, 11
Tyco BMW Motorrad	BMW	18	(Northern Ireland) Andy Reid	5–9
Tyco BMW Motorrad	BMW	24	(England) Christian Iddon	1–4, 6–12
Tyco BMW Motorrad	BMW	34	(Italy) Davide Giugliano	1–2
Tyco BMW Motorrad	BMW	34	(Northern Ireland) Alastair Seeley	3
Bathams SMT	BMW	11	(England) Michael Rutter	1, 7, 12
JG Speedfit Kawasaki	Kawasaki	12	(England) Luke Mossey	1–7, 9–12
JG Speedfit Kawasaki	Kawasaki	91	(England) Leon Haslam	All
Smiths Racing	BMW	14	(England) Lee Jackson	All
Smiths Racing	BMW	60	(England) Peter Hickman	All
Moto Rapido	Ducati	21	(United States) John Hopkins	All
RAF Regular & Reserve Kawasaki	Kawasaki	27	(England) Jake Dixon	All
Buildbase Suzuki	Suzuki	28	(England) Bradley Ray	All
Buildbase Suzuki	Suzuki	33	(Northern Ireland) Michael Dunlop	1, 3, 7
RidersMotorcycles.com BMW	BMW	40	(England) Martin Jessopp	1, 3, 5–12
Team WD-40	Kawasaki	46	(England) Tommy Bridewell	All
Platform Hire Yamaha	Yamaha	64	(England) Aaron Zanotti	All
Lloyd & Jones PR Racing BMW	BMW	96	(Czech Republic) Jakub Smrž	All

Key
Regular rider
Wildcard rider
Replacement rider

- All entries used Pirelli tyres.

== Race calendar and results ==
2017 calendar
Main Season
Round		Circuit	Date	Pole position	Fastest lap	Winning rider	Winning team
1	R1	(England) Donington Park GP	2 April	(England) Leon Haslam	(Australia) Josh Brookes	(England) Leon Haslam	JG Speedfit Kawasaki
1	R2	(England) Donington Park GP	2 April		(England) Leon Haslam	(England) Leon Haslam	JG Speedfit Kawasaki
2	R1	(England) Brands Hatch Indy	17 April	(England) James Ellison	(England) James Ellison	(England) Luke Mossey	JG Speedfit Kawasaki
2	R2	(England) Brands Hatch Indy	17 April		(England) Shane Byrne	(England) Luke Mossey	JG Speedfit Kawasaki
3	R1	(England) Oulton Park	1 May	(England) Shane Byrne	(England) Leon Haslam	(England) Leon Haslam	JG Speedfit Kawasaki
3	R2	(England) Oulton Park	1 May		(England) Leon Haslam	(England) Shane Byrne	Be Wiser Ducati Racing Team
4	R1	(Scotland) Knockhill	18 June	(England) Luke Mossey	(England) Luke Mossey	(England) Jake Dixon	RAF Regular & Reserve Kawasaki
4	R2	(Scotland) Knockhill	18 June		(England) Luke Mossey	(England) Jake Dixon	RAF Regular & Reserve Kawasaki
5	R1	(England) Snetterton 300	2 July	(England) Shane Byrne	(England) Shane Byrne	(England) Shane Byrne	Be Wiser Ducati Racing Team
5	R2	(England) Snetterton 300	2 July		(England) Shane Byrne	(England) Shane Byrne	Be Wiser Ducati Racing Team
6	R1	(England) Brands Hatch GP	23 July	(Australia) Josh Brookes	(England) Dan Linfoot	(England) Shane Byrne	Be Wiser Ducati Racing Team
6	R2	(England) Brands Hatch GP	23 July		(Australia) Josh Brookes	(England) Shane Byrne	Be Wiser Ducati Racing Team
7	R1	(England) Thruxton	6 August	(England) Jake Dixon	(England) Peter Hickman	(Australia) Josh Brookes	Anvil Hire Tag Yamaha
7	R2	(England) Thruxton	6 August		(England) Shane Byrne	(England) Peter Hickman	Smiths Racing BMW
8	R1	(England) Cadwell Park	20 August	(England) Shane Byrne	(England) Lee Jackson	(England) Leon Haslam	JG Speedfit Kawasaki
8	R2	(England) Cadwell Park	20 August		(England) Lee Jackson	(England) James Ellison	McAMS Yamaha
9	R1	(England) Silverstone GP	9 September	(Australia) Jason O'Halloran	(England) Shane Byrne	(Northern Ireland) Glenn Irwin	Be Wiser Ducati Racing Team
9	R2	(England) Silverstone GP	10 September		(England) James Ellison	(Australia) Josh Brookes	Anvil Hire Tag Yamaha
9	R3	(England) Silverstone GP	10 September		(England) Christian Iddon	(England) Dan Linfoot	Honda Racing
The Showdown
10	R1	(England) Oulton Park	16 September	(England) Jake Dixon	(England) Jake Dixon	(England) Leon Haslam	JG Speedfit Kawasaki
10	R2	(England) Oulton Park	17 September		(England) Bradley Ray	(England) Dan Linfoot	Honda Racing
11	R1	(Netherlands) TT Circuit Assen	1 October	(England) James Ellison	(England) Shane Byrne	(England) Leon Haslam	JG Speedfit Kawasaki
11	R2	(Netherlands) TT Circuit Assen	1 October		(England) Shane Byrne	(France) Sylvain Guintoli	Bennetts Suzuki
12	R1	(England) Brands Hatch GP	14 October	(England) Shane Byrne	(Australia) Josh Brookes	(England) Shane Byrne	Be Wiser Ducati Racing Team
12	R2	(England) Brands Hatch GP	15 October		(England) James Ellison	(England) Shane Byrne	Be Wiser Ducati Racing Team
12	R3	(England) Brands Hatch GP	15 October		(Australia) Jason O'Halloran	(Australia) Josh Brookes	Anvil Hire Tag Yamaha

== Championship standings ==
=== Riders' championship ===
Scoring system

Points were awarded to the top fifteen finishers. A rider had to finish the race to earn points.

Position	**1st**	**2nd**	**3rd**	**4th**	**5th**	**6th**	**7th**	**8th**	**9th**	**10th**	**11th**	**12th**	**13th**	**14th**	**15th**
Points	25	20	16	13	11	10	9	8	7	6	5	4	3	2	1

Pos	Rider	Bike	DON (England)		BRH (England)		OUL (England)		KNO (Scotland)		SNE (England)		BRH (England)		THR (England)		CAD (England)		SIL (England)			OUL (England)		ASS (Netherlands)		BRH (England)			Pts
Pos	Rider	Bike	R1	R2	R1	R2	R1	R2	R1	R2	R1	R2	R1	R2	R1	R2	R1	R2	R1	R2	R3	R1	R2	R1	R2	R1	R2	R3	Pts
The Championship Showdown
1	(England) Shane Byrne	Ducati	DNS	DNS	4	Ret	**2**	1	3	3	**1**	**1**	1	1	4	Ret	**3**	Ret	Ret	**3**	Ret	9	7	2	**5**	**1**	1	8	637
2	(Australia) Josh Brookes	Yamaha	7	**2**	10	4	7	6	Ret	5	2	2	**5**	Ret	1	Ret	12	7	2	1	Ret	3	5	5	2	3	**4**	1	634
3	(England) Leon Haslam	Kawasaki	**1**	1	2	3	1	**Ret**	DNS	DNS	4	8	3	5	7	3	1	Ret	Ret	Ret	Ret	1	2	1	3	4	10	Ret	631
4	(England) Peter Hickman	BMW	4	8	9	7	5	7	6	9	7	6	4	4	2	**1**	4	3	9	8	Ret	8	4	7	6	7	6	6	578
5	(Australia) Jason O'Halloran	Honda	10	10	7	5	4	3	4	7	3	3	7	7	6	5	5	4	**11**	5	Ret	10	8	10	13	6	5	2	567
6	(England) Jake Dixon	Kawasaki	9	Ret	Ret	13	10	Ret	1	1	6	4	11	10	**3**	2	2	Ret	4	9	3	**4**	**6**	8	7	DNS	Ret	12	562
BSB Riders Cup
7	(England) Christian Iddon	BMW	3	4	3	2	8	4	DNS	DNS			8	3	5	4	8	5	6	7	Ret	Ret	9	Ret	8	2	2	5	238
8	(England) James Ellison	Yamaha	5	6	**Ret**	**Ret**	6	Ret	Ret	2	Ret	Ret	6	2	19	9	10	1	Ret	2	**Ret**	5	10	**3**	4	5	3	**3**	228
9	(England) Luke Mossey	Kawasaki	2	5	1	1	3	5	**2**	**4**	Ret	10	12	6	DNS	DNS			5	12	Ret	Ret	DNS	12	Ret	12	14	17	186
10	(England) Dan Linfoot	Honda	11	12	5	6	16	16	Ret	6	5	7	2	**Ret**	15	12	Ret	DNS	16	Ret	1	Ret	1	11	9	DNS	9	7	163
11	(England) Bradley Ray	Suzuki	Ret	14	12	8	Ret	Ret	Ret	12	9	11	10	8	8	Ret	14	11	10	6	6	7	3	6	10	9	Ret	9	140
12	(Northern Ireland) Glenn Irwin	Ducati	6	3	6	Ret	9	2	DNS	DNS			16	14	20	11	11	9	1	Ret	Ret	11	12	14	14	Ret	7	13	132
13	(France) Sylvain Guintoli	Suzuki	Ret	7	Ret	10	Ret	11	8	14	10	9	Ret	17	10	8	18	10	13	4	Ret	Ret	11	4	1	DNS	12	11	131
14	(Northern Ireland) Michael Laverty	Yamaha	8	Ret	8	11	Ret	Ret	10	8	12	15	13	9	21	13	7	8	17	15	2	6	14	Ret	15	Ret	8	4	125
15	(United States) John Hopkins	Ducati	Ret	13	13	9	14	9	7	17	8	5	9	11	9	Ret	DNS	DNS	3	10	Ret	2	Ret	9	12	DNS	DNS	DNS	122
16	(England) Lee Jackson	BMW	DNS	DNS	16	16	15	13	9	13	13	13	15	13	14	7	6	**2**	12	Ret	7	12	15	16	17	8	13	14	96
17	(England) Tommy Bridewell	Kawasaki	12	11	11	12	11	8	11	15	14	14	14	12	16	14	9	6	Ret	11	Ret	Ret	Ret	15	18	11	11	15	83
18	(Czech Republic) Jakub Smrž	BMW	14	15	14	15	13	12	12	16	Ret	12	DNS	DNS	12	10	17	14	8	13	5	13	13	18	Ret	13	15	16	65
19	(Scotland) Taylor Mackenzie	Suzuki	Ret	Ret	15	14	18	15	5	11	Ret	Ret	Ret	15	13	DNS	15	15	7	Ret	DNS			DNS	DNS				35
20	(England) James Westmoreland	Kawasaki	DNS	16	17	Ret	20	17	13	18	16	17	18	Ret	18	15	19	16	14	14	4	14	Ret	20	Ret	14	18	21	25
21	(England) Martin Jessopp	BMW	Ret	DNS			23	14			Ret	Ret	20	19	11	6	16	12	15	Ret	Ret	Ret	16	17	16	DNS	16	19	22
22	(Australia) Billy McConnell	Kawasaki	Ret	Ret	18	17	12	10	Ret	10	11	16	17	16	Ret	DNS													21
23	(England) Richard Cooper	Suzuki																						13	11	10	Ret	10	20
24	(Italy) Davide Giugliano	BMW	13	9	DNS	DNS																							10
25	(Republic of Ireland) Andy Reid	BMW									17	18	19	18	17	16	13	13	Ret	Ret	DNS								6
26	(England) Aaron Zanotti	Yamaha	Ret	Ret	19	Ret	22	19	14	19	18	19	Ret	20	Ret	Ret	Ret	18	18	17	Ret	17	Ret	21	Ret	Ret	19	22	2
27	(England) Shaun Winfield	Yamaha	15	18	Ret	18	21	18	Ret	20	19	20	Ret	DNS	22	17	20	17	20	Ret	Ret	15	Ret	22	Ret	17	20	24	2
28	(England) Kyle Ryde	Kawasaki																								15	17	18	1
29	(Northern Ireland) Josh Elliott	BMW									15	Ret												19	19				1
	(England) Dean Harrison	Kawasaki																	Ret	16	Ret	16	17	23	Ret	16	Ret	23	0
	(Northern Ireland) Michael Dunlop	Suzuki	16	17			19	Ret							Ret	DNS													0
	(Northern Ireland) Alastair Seeley	BMW					17	Ret																					0
	(England) Luke Stapleford	Kawasaki																	19	DNS	DNS								0
	(England) Michael Rutter	BMW	DNS	DNS											Ret	Ret										DNS	Ret	20	0
	(England) Danny Buchan	Kawasaki																						Ret	DNS				0
Pos	Rider	Bike	DON (England)		BRH (England)		OUL (England)		KNO (Scotland)		SNE (England)		BRH (England)		THR (England)		CAD (England)		SIL (England)			OUL (England)		ASS (Netherlands)		BRH (England)			Pts

Colour	Result
Gold	Winner
Silver	Second place
Bronze	Third place
Green	Points classification
Blue	Non-points classification
Blue	Non-classified finish (NC)
Purple	Retired, not classified (Ret)
Red	Did not qualify (DNQ)
Red	Did not pre-qualify (DNPQ)
Black	Disqualified (DSQ)
White	Did not start (DNS)
White	Withdrew (WD)
White	Race cancelled (C)
Blank	Did not practice (DNP)
Blank	Did not arrive (DNA)
Blank	Excluded (EX)

**Bold** – Pole position
Italics – Fastest lap

=== Manufacturers' championship ===
Pos	Manufacturer	DON (England)		BRH (England)		OUL (England)		KNO (Scotland)		SNE (England)		BRH (England)		THR (England)		CAD (England)		SIL (England)			OUL (England)		ASS (Netherlands)		BRH (England)			Pts
Pos	Manufacturer	R1	R2	R1	R2	R1	R2	R1	R2	R1	R2	R1	R2	R1	R2	R1	R2	R1	R2	R3	R1	R2	R1	R2	R1	R2	R3	Pts
1	(Japan) Kawasaki	1	1	1	1	1	5	1	1	4	4	3	5	3	2	1	6	4	9	3	1	2	1	3	4	10	12	455
2	(Italy) Ducati	6	3	4	9	2	1	3	3	1	1	1	1	4	11	3	9	1	3	Ret	2	7	2	5	1	1	8	423
3	(Japan) Yamaha	5	2	8	4	6	6	10	2	2	2	5	2	1	9	7	1	2	1	2	3	5	3	2	3	3	1	420
4	(Germany) BMW	3	4	3	2	5	4	6	9	7	6	4	3	2	1	4	2	6	7	5	8	4	7	6	2	2	5	353
5	(Japan) Honda	10	10	5	5	4	3	4	6	3	3	2	7	6	5	5	4	11	5	1	10	1	10	9	6	5	2	318
6	(Japan) Suzuki	16	7	12	8	18	11	5	11	9	9	10	8	8	8	14	10	7	4	6	7	3	4	1	9	12	9	207
Pos	Manufacturer	DON (England)		BRH (England)		OUL (England)		KNO (Scotland)		SNE (England)		BRH (England)		THR (England)		CAD (England)		SIL (England)			OUL (England)		ASS (Netherlands)		BRH (England)			Pts
