= 2022 British Superbike Championship =

British motorcycle racing season

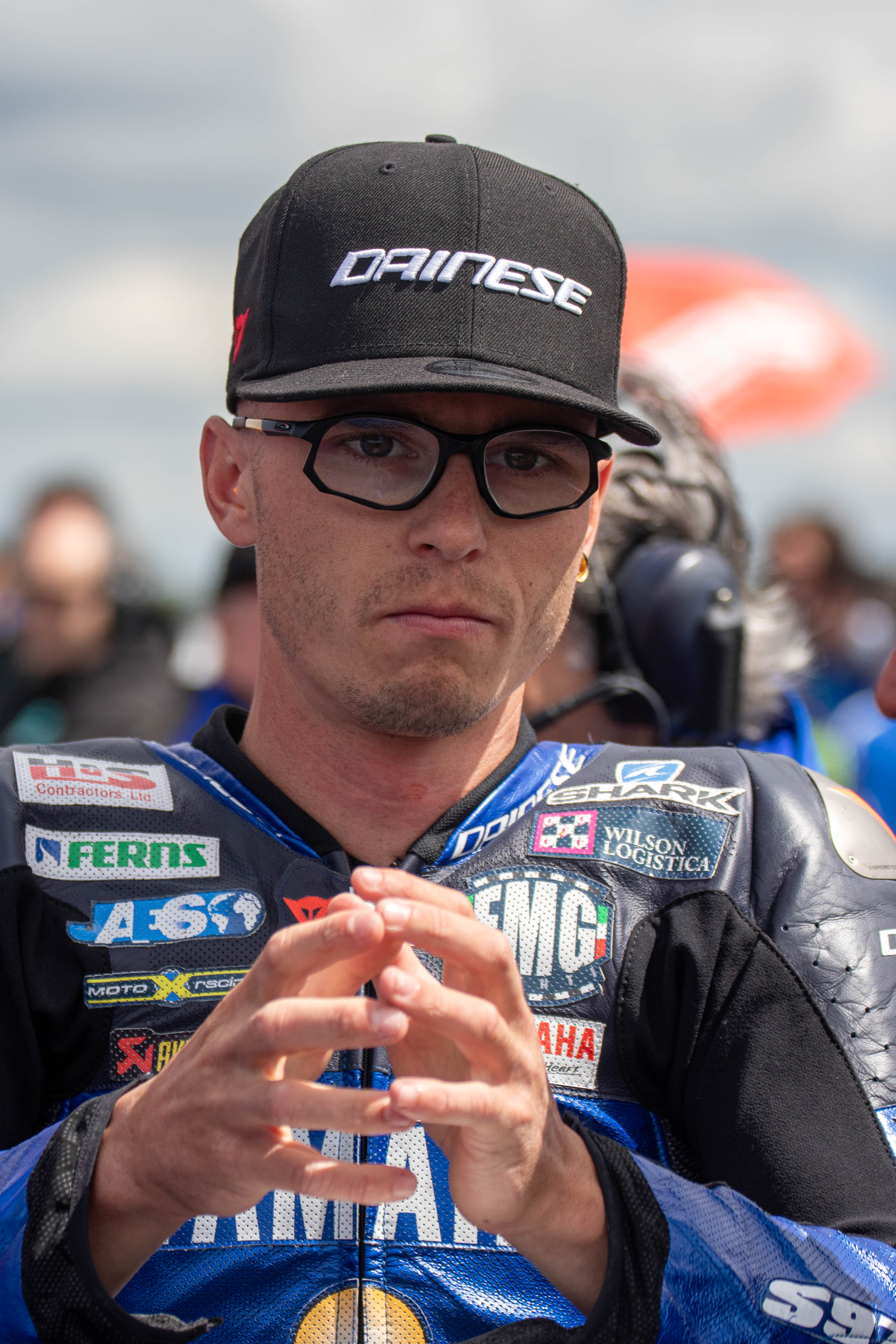
2022 champion, Bradley Ray

The 2022 British Superbike Championship season was the 35th British Superbike Championship season. The title was won by Bradley Ray on a Rich Energy sponsored OMG Racing Yamaha R1. The season was marred by the death of Chrissy Rouse a few days after an incident during the final race at Donington Park.

== Teams and riders ==
2022 Entry List
Team	Constructor	No.	Rider	Rounds
McAMS Yamaha	Yamaha	1	(Scotland) Tarran Mackenzie	3–9
McAMS Yamaha	Yamaha	22	(Australia) Jason O'Halloran	All
Honda Racing UK	Honda	2	(Northern Ireland) Glenn Irwin	All
Honda Racing UK	Honda	13	(Japan) Takumi Takahashi	All
Honda Racing UK	Honda	68	(England) Tom Neave	All
Honda Racing UK	Honda	88	(Japan) Ryo Mizuno	All
iForce BMW	BMW	4	(England) Dan Linfoot	1–5
iForce BMW	BMW	12	(England) Luke Mossey	6, 8, 10
iForce BMW	BMW	44	(Wales) Dan Jones	1–7
DAO Racing Kawasaki	Kawasaki	5	(England) Dean Harrison	1–2, 4–11
NP Motorcycles Kawasaki	Kawasaki	6	(England) James East	3–7
FHO Racing BMW	BMW	7	(England) Ryan Vickers	All
FHO Racing BMW	BMW	60	(England) Peter Hickman	All
FS-3 Racing Kawasaki	Kawasaki	11	(Scotland) Rory Skinner	1–9
FS-3 Racing Kawasaki	Kawasaki	14	(England) Lee Jackson	All
TAG Racing Honda	Honda	12	(England) Luke Mossey	1–5
TAG Racing Honda	Honda	53	(Spain) Tito Rabat	6–7
TAG Racing Honda	Honda	53	(England) Shaun Winfield	7
Black Onyx Security Honda	Honda	16	(England) Luke Hopkins	1–7
SYNETIQ BMW Motorrad	BMW	18	(Northern Ireland) Andrew Irwin	All
SYNETIQ BMW Motorrad	BMW	83	(England) Danny Buchan	All
Rich Energy OMG Racing	Yamaha	20	(Australia) David Johnson	1–2
Rich Energy OMG Racing	Yamaha	28	(England) Bradley Ray	All
Rich Energy OMG Racing	Yamaha	37	(England) James Hillier	1
Rich Energy OMG Racing	Yamaha	77	(England) Kyle Ryde	All
Buildbase Suzuki delivered by Hawk Racing	Suzuki	21	(England) Christian Iddon	1–9, 11
Buildbase Suzuki delivered by Hawk Racing	Suzuki	86	(England) Charlie Nesbitt	10–11
Buildbase Suzuki delivered by Hawk Racing	Suzuki	52	(England) Danny Kent	All
MCE Ducati	Ducati	25	(Australia) Josh Brookes	All
MCE Ducati	Ducati	66	(England) Tom Sykes	All
Powerslide/Catfoss Racing	Suzuki	27	(South Africa) Bjorn Estment	1–2
Powerslide/Catfoss Racing	Suzuki	33	(Finland) Eemeli Lahti	10–11
Rapid CDH Racing	Kawasaki	34	(England) Liam Delves	All
Rapid CDH Racing	Kawasaki	65	(England) Josh Owens	All
Oxford Products Racing	Ducati	46	(England) Tommy Bridewell	All
Specsavers Suzuki	Suzuki	55	(England) Leon Jeacock	All
Crowe Performance	BMW	69	(England) Chrissy Rouse	1–10
Team LKQ Euro Car Parts Kawasaki	Kawasaki	79	(England) Storm Stacey	All
VisionTrack Kawasaki	Kawasaki	91	(England) Leon Haslam	All
Milenco by Padgett's Motorcycles	Honda	24	(Isle of Man) Conor Cummins	2
Milenco by Padgett's Motorcycles	Honda	74	(England) Davey Todd	11
Mar-Train Racing	Yamaha	4	(Republic of Ireland) Jack Kennedy	10–11

== Race calendar and results ==
2022 calendar
Main Season
Round		Circuit	Date	Pole position	Fastest lap	Winning rider	Winning team
1	R1	(England) Silverstone National	16 April	(Northern Ireland) Glenn Irwin	(England) Kyle Ryde	(Northern Ireland) Glenn Irwin	Honda Racing UK
1	R2	(England) Silverstone National	17 April		(England) Bradley Ray	(Northern Ireland) Glenn Irwin	Honda Racing UK
1	R3	(England) Silverstone National	17 April		(England) Danny Buchan	(Northern Ireland) Glenn Irwin	Honda Racing UK
2	R1	(England) Oulton Park	1 May	(England) Kyle Ryde	(England) Bradley Ray	(England) Bradley Ray	Rich Energy OMG Racing
2	R2	(England) Oulton Park	2 May		(England) Bradley Ray	(England) Bradley Ray	Rich Energy OMG Racing
2	R3	(England) Oulton Park	2 May		(England) Bradley Ray	(England) Lee Jackson	FS-3 Racing Kawasaki
3	R1	(England) Donington Park National	21 May	(Australia) Jason O'Halloran	(Australia) Jason O'Halloran	(England) Kyle Ryde	Rich Energy OMG Racing
3	R2	(England) Donington Park National	22 May		(England) Kyle Ryde	(Australia) Jason O'Halloran	McAMS Yamaha
3	R3	(England) Donington Park National	22 May		(Australia) Jason O'Halloran	(Australia) Jason O'Halloran	McAMS Yamaha
4	R1	(Scotland) Knockhill	18 June	(England) Bradley Ray	(England) Bradley Ray	(England) Bradley Ray	Rich Energy OMG Racing
4	R2	(Scotland) Knockhill	19 June		(Scotland) Rory Skinner	(Australia) Jason O'Halloran	McAMS Yamaha
4	R3	(Scotland) Knockhill	19 June		(Scotland) Rory Skinner	(Australia) Jason O'Halloran	McAMS Yamaha
5	R1	(England) Brands Hatch GP	23 July	(Australia) Jason O'Halloran	(Scotland) Tarran Mackenzie	(Australia) Jason O'Halloran	McAMS Yamaha
5	R2	(England) Brands Hatch GP	24 July		(Scotland) Tarran Mackenzie	(Scotland) Tarran Mackenzie	McAMS Yamaha
5	R3	(England) Brands Hatch GP	24 July		(Scotland) Tarran Mackenzie	(Scotland) Tarran Mackenzie	McAMS Yamaha
6	R1	(England) Thruxton	13 August	(Australia) Jason O'Halloran	(England) Bradley Ray	(Australia) Jason O'Halloran	McAMS Yamaha
6	R2	(England) Thruxton	14 August		(England) Bradley Ray	(Australia) Jason O'Halloran	McAMS Yamaha
6	R3	(England) Thruxton	14 August		(England) Peter Hickman	(Scotland) Tarran Mackenzie	McAMS Yamaha
7	R1	(England) Cadwell Park	28 August	(England) Bradley Ray	(England) Tommy Bridewell	(England) Bradley Ray	Rich Energy OMG Racing
7	R2	(England) Cadwell Park	29 August		(England) Bradley Ray	(England) Danny Buchan	SYNETIQ BMW Motorrad
7	R3	(England) Cadwell Park	29 August		(England) Peter Hickman	(England) Danny Buchan	SYNETIQ BMW Motorrad
8	R1	(England) Snetterton 300	10 September	(England) Christian Iddon	(England) Bradley Ray	(England) Bradley Ray	Rich Energy OMG Racing
8	R2	(England) Snetterton 300	11 September		(Scotland) Tarran Mackenzie	(England) Bradley Ray	Rich Energy OMG Racing
8	R3	(England) Snetterton 300	11 September		(Scotland) Tarran Mackenzie	(England) Bradley Ray	Rich Energy OMG Racing
The Showdown
9	R1	(England) Oulton Park	24 September	(England) Bradley Ray	(Australia) Jason O'Halloran	(England) Bradley Ray	Rich Energy OMG Racing
9	R2	(England) Oulton Park	25 September		(England) Tommy Bridewell	(England) Lee Jackson	FS-3 Racing Kawasaki
9	R3	(England) Oulton Park	25 September		(England) Bradley Ray	(England) Tommy Bridewell	Oxford Products Racing
10	R1	(England) Donington Park GP	1 October	(Australia) Jason O'Halloran	(England) Peter Hickman	(England) Tom Sykes	MCE Ducati
10	R2	(England) Donington Park GP	2 October		(England) Tom Sykes	(England) Tom Sykes	MCE Ducati
10	R3	(England) Donington Park GP	2 October		(England) Bradley Ray	(England) Bradley Ray	Rich Energy OMG Racing
11	R1	(England) Brands Hatch GP	15 October	(Northern Ireland) Glenn Irwin	(Northern Ireland) Glenn Irwin	(Northern Ireland) Glenn Irwin	Honda Racing UK
11	R2	(England) Brands Hatch GP	16 October		(Northern Ireland) Glenn Irwin	(England) Peter Hickman	FHO Racing BMW
11	R3	(England) Brands Hatch GP	16 October		(Northern Ireland) Andrew Irwin	(Northern Ireland) Glenn Irwin	Honda Racing UK

== Championship standings ==
=== Riders' championship ===
Scoring system

Points are awarded to the top fifteen finishers. A rider has to finish the race to earn points.

Position	1st	2nd	3rd	4th	5th	6th	7th	8th	9th	10th	11th	12th	13th	14th	15th
Points	25	20	16	13	11	10	9	8	7	6	5	4	3	2	1

Pos	Rider	Bike	SIL (England)			OUL (England)			DON (England)			KNO (Scotland)			BRH (England)			THR (England)			CAD (England)			SNE (England)			OUL (England)			DON (England)			BRH (England)			Pts
Pos	Rider	Bike	R1	R2	R3	R1	R2	R3	R1	R2	R3	R1	R2	R3	R1	R2	R3	R1	R2	R3	R1	R2	R3	R1	R2	R3	R1	R2	R3	R1	R2	R3	R1	R2	R3	Pts
The Championship Showdown
1	(England) Bradley Ray	Yamaha	3	Ret	2	1	1	3	3	2	2	1	4	2	4	4	4	3	3	2	1	2	2	1	1	1	1	3	5	4	2	1	5	Ret	6	1192
2	(Northern Ireland) Glenn Irwin	Honda	1	1	1	11	9	7	5	Ret	Ret	7	8	6	Ret	10	3	4	6	4	9	9	8	9	4	4	4	4	2	5	3	3	1	3	1	1171
3	(England) Tommy Bridewell	Ducati	7	8	7	6	Ret	2	8	Ret	Ret	8	5	5	3	3	5	10	10	7	5	3	3	19	3	7	2	2	1	8	6	4	4	5	4	1141
4	(England) Lee Jackson	Kawasaki	9	4	8	9	2	1	4	3	3	4	2	3	9	Ret	10	6	5	5	DNS	14	12	6	8	10	6	1	3	6	5	7	Ret	DNS	DNS	1095
5	(Australia) Jason O'Halloran	Yamaha	5	6	5	8	6	6	2	1	1	2	1	1	1	2	2	1	1	3	4	8	9	12	9	5	Ret	DNS	DNS	2	7	Ret	6	Ret	DNS	1087
6	(England) Kyle Ryde	Yamaha	2	2	10	3	4	10	1	Ret	4	6	9	9	5	7	7	13	18	Ret	12	15	16	3	6	8	9	Ret	9	7	11	6	9	4	10	1077
7	(Scotland) Tarran Mackenzie	Yamaha							10	6	11	DNS	10	8	2	1	1	2	2	1	11	11	10	2	2	3	Ret	DNS	DNS							1031
8	(Scotland) Rory Skinner	Kawasaki	4	3	4	2	5	4	7	8	4	3	3	Ret	7	6	9	7	7	9	2	5	5	DNS	11	DNS	8	DNS	DNS							1017
BSB Riders Cup
9	(England) Peter Hickman	BMW	11	7	9	5	8	9	9	4	Ret	13	Ret	12	11	12	8	5	4	Ret	6	7	6	8	5	2	DSQ	10	7	3	8	11	2	1	5	283
10	(England) Danny Buchan	BMW	10	9	6	10	11	13	12	13	9	5	7	4	Ret	15	13	14	8	Ret	3	1	1	Ret	7	Ret	5	5	4	12	12	5	7	2	3	272
11	(England) Leon Haslam	Kawasaki	Ret	15	13	13	3	5	Ret	5	Ret	11	Ret	11	8	5	6	8	9	6	8	4	4	5	17	6	3	6	14	9	Ret	10	Ret	Ret	DNS	205
12	(England) Tom Sykes	Ducati	12	Ret	16	15	13	11	11	11	7	12	11	10	13	8	Ret	9	12	10	Ret	10	20	7	10	Ret	10	7	6	1	1	Ret	10	10	11	187
13	(Northern Ireland) Andrew Irwin	BMW	6	5	3	12	Ret	Ret	17	14	12	14	Ret	16	14	Ret	12	Ret	13	8	7	6	7	Ret	Ret	9	Ret	9	12	Ret	4	2	3	17	2	181
14	(Australia) Josh Brookes	Ducati	13	11	18	4	10	8	13	10	8	10	6	7	6	Ret	Ret	20	15	Ret	10	Ret	11	13	12	11	10	8	8	11	9	16	Ret	9	7	161
15	(England) Christian Iddon	Suzuki	8	10	11	7	7	14	6	7	6	Ret	DNS	DNS	10	Ret	11	12	11	11	18	12	Ret	4	Ret	Ret	7	DNS	DNS				Ret	7	9	135
16	(England) Danny Kent	Suzuki	17	18	15	21	19	Ret	DNS	DNS	DNS	19	14	Ret	12	9	Ret	Ret	22	15	15	16	14	10	Ret	12	12	12	10	17	14	9	8	6	8	77
17	(England) Ryan Vickers	BMW	14	13	19	14	12	Ret	Ret	9	Ret	15	Ret	Ret	Ret	Ret	DNS	11	Ret	13	13	13	13	Ret	DNS	DNS	Ret	13	13	10	10	8	Ret	Ret	13	65
18	(England) Storm Stacey	Kawasaki	20	Ret	Ret	16	14	12	Ret	Ret	14	9	Ret	13	Ret	19	20	25	24	18	19	19	17	15	13	Ret	Ret	11	11	16	19	12	17	14	16	38
19	(England) Tom Neave	Honda	15	14	12	17	15	Ret	19	DNS	DNS	17	13	14	17	11	Ret	16	Ret	20	14	17	19	14	14	13	13	Ret	Ret	13	Ret	14	Ret	16	17	35
20	(Japan) Takumi Takahashi	Honda	16	16	17	25	21	17	16	16	15	21	16	15	18	13	14	23	20	14	DNS	20	15	11	Ret	17	16	14	16	14	15	15	13	13	15	28
21	(England) Charlie Nesbitt	Suzuki																												19	13	13	11	8	12	23
22	(England) Chrissy Rouse^{†}	BMW	Ret	Ret	DNS	18	16	Ret	14	12	10	16	12	17	Ret	16	15	Ret	16	17	Ret	21	Ret	Ret	DNS	Ret	15	Ret	17	18	17	DNS				18
23	(Japan) Ryo Mizuno	Honda	Ret	17	20	22	22	21	15	15	13	18	15	Ret	22	Ret	21	15	14	12	20	22	21	16	15	14	18	15	20	15	16	20	Ret	18	19	18
24	(England) Josh Owens	Kawasaki	18	Ret	21	19	18	18	18	17	Ret	Ret	20	Ret	15	14	16	21	23	16	17	Ret	DNS	Ret	Ret	Ret	17	DNS	18	20	Ret	19	12	11	14	14
25	(England) Dean Harrison	Kawasaki	22	Ret	DNS	23	17	16				22	17	18	Ret	18	19	22	17	Ret	16	18	18	Ret	Ret	15	14	Ret	15	21	18	Ret	16	12	Ret	8
26	(England) Dan Linfoot	BMW	Ret	12	14	20	20	15	20	18	Ret	Ret	18	Ret	Ret	DNS	DNS																			7
27	(Republic of Ireland) Jack Kennedy	Yamaha																												22	Ret	17	14	Ret	Ret	2
28	(England) Davey Todd	Honda																															15	15	Ret	2
	(England) Leon Jeacock	Suzuki	26	22	25	28	25	20	22	Ret	Ret	24	19	20	21	20	22	18	21	19	21	23	Ret	17	Ret	16	Ret	16	19	24	20	18	18	19	18	0
	(England) Liam Delves	Kawasaki	28	23	Ret	Ret	Ret	Ret	23	Ret	DNS	DNS	21	21	23	21	Ret	19	27	23	23	Ret	DNS	18	16	Ret	19	17	Ret	Ret	DNS	DNS	20	20	Ret	0
	(Wales) Dan Jones	BMW	21	Ret	22	27	23	19	Ret	19	16	Ret	Ret	Ret	20	Ret	Ret	17	19	DNS	DNS	WD	WD													0
	(England) Luke Mossey	Honda/BMW	19	Ret	Ret	24	Ret	DNS	DNS	DNS	DNS	20	Ret	Ret	16	Ret	17	Ret	Ret	DNS				DNS	DNS	DNS				23	Ret	DNS				0
	(England) Luke Hopkins	Honda	25	20	23	26	24	22	21	Ret	Ret	23	Ret	19	19	17	18	24	26	21	22	Ret	22													0
	(Finland) Eemeli Lahti	Suzuki																												25	Ret	21	19	21	20	0
	(Australia) David Johnson	Yamaha	27	19	Ret	Ret	DNS	DNS																												0
	(England) James Hillier	Yamaha	24	21	24																															0
	(England) James East	Kawasaki							Ret	Ret	Ret	25	Ret	22	24	22	23	Ret	25	22	Ret	24	23													0
	(South Africa) Bjorn Estment	Suzuki	23	Ret	DNS	Ret	Ret	Ret																												0
	(Spain) Tito Rabat	Honda																26	28	Ret	WD	WD	WD													0
	(Isle of Man) Conor Cummins	Honda				29	Ret	DNS																												0
	(England) Shaun Winfield	Honda																			DNP	DNP	DNP													0
Pos	Rider	Bike	SIL (England)			OUL (England)			DON (England)			KNO (Scotland)			BRH (England)			THR (England)			CAD (England)			SNE (England)			OUL (England)			DON (England)			BRH (England)			Pts

=== Manufacturers standings ===
Each manufacturer is awarded the same number of points as their best placed rider in each race.

Pos.	Constructor	SIL (England)			OUL (England)			DON (England)			KNO (Scotland)			BRH (England)			THR (England)			CAD (England)			SNE (England)			OUL (England)			DON (England)			BRH (England)			Pts
Pos.	Constructor	R1	R2	R3	R1	R2	R3	R1	R2	R3	R1	R2	R3	R1	R2	R3	R1	R2	R3	R1	R2	R3	R1	R2	R3	R1	R2	R3	R1	R2	R3	R1	R2	R3	Pts
1	(Japan) Yamaha	2	2	2	1	1	3	1	1	1	1	1	1	1	1	1	1	1	1	1	2	2	1	1	1	1	3	5	2	2	1	5	4	6	717
2	(Japan) Kawasaki	4	3	4	2	2	1	4	3	3	3	2	3	7	5	6	6	5	5	2	4	4	5	8	6	3	1	3	6	5	7	12	11	14	439
3	(Germany) BMW	6	5	3	5	8	9	9	4	9	5	7	4	11	12	8	5	4	8	3	1	1	8	5	2	5	5	4	3	4	2	2	1	2	426
4	(Italy) Ducati	7	8	7	4	10	2	8	10	7	8	5	5	3	3	5	9	10	7	5	3	3	7	3	7	2	2	1	1	1	4	4	5	4	425
5	(Japan) Honda	1	1	1	11	9	7	5	15	13	7	8	6	16	10	3	4	6	4	9	9	8	9	4	4	4	4	2	5	3	3	1	3	1	406
6	(Japan) Suzuki	8	10	11	7	7	14	6	7	6	19	14	20	10	9	11	12	11	11	15	12	14	4	16	12	7	12	10	17	13	9	8	6	8	181
Pos.	Constructor	SIL (England)			OUL (England)			DON (England)			KNO (Scotland)			BRH (England)			THR (England)			CAD (England)			SNE (England)			OUL (England)			DON (England)			BRH (England)			Pts
Source:																																			Pts
