= 2018 British Superbike Championship =

British motorcycle racing season

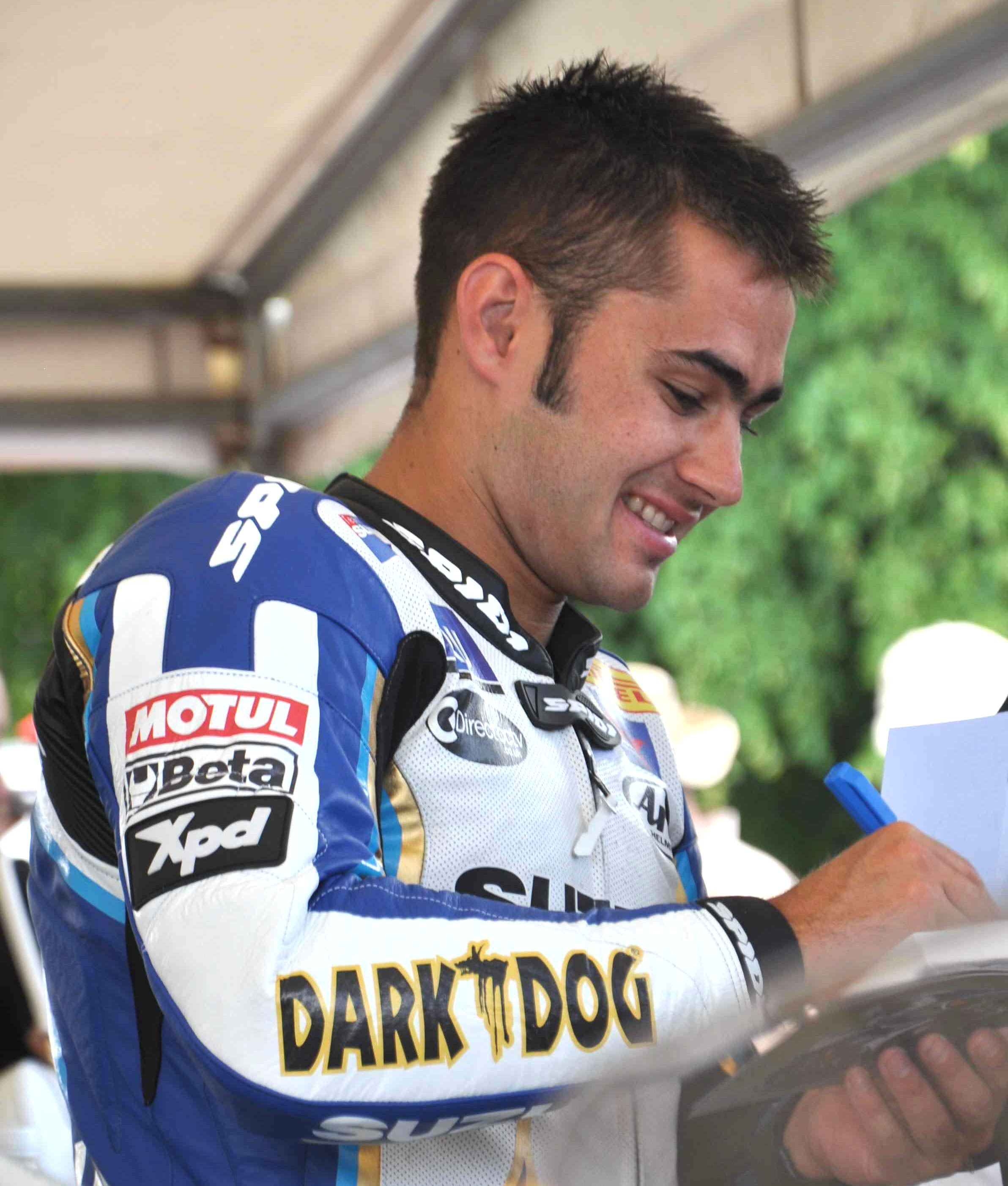
2018 champion, Leon Haslam

The 2018 British Superbike Championship season is the 31st British Superbike Championship season. Shane Byrne started the season as the defending Champion, having secured his sixth overall title in the British Superbike Championship. He had a serious crash early in the year that ultimately ended his season and racing career. Leon Haslam on a JG Speedfit backed Bournemouth Kawasaki took the 2018 BSB Championship Title over Jake Dixon.

== Teams and riders ==
Team	Constructor	No.	Rider	Rounds
Be Wiser Ducati Racing Team	Ducati	2	(Northern Ireland) Glenn Irwin	All
Be Wiser Ducati Racing Team	Ducati	18	(Northern Ireland) Andrew Irwin	4–12
Be Wiser Ducati Racing Team	Ducati	67	(England) Shane Byrne	1–3
Honda Racing	Honda	4	(England) Dan Linfoot	1–2, 4–6, 9–12
Honda Racing	Honda	22	(Australia) Jason O'Halloran	All
Honda Racing	Honda	23	(Japan) Ryuichi Kiyonari	3
Honda Racing	Honda	68	(England) Tom Neave	7-8
Silicone Engineering Racing	Kawasaki	5	(England) Dean Harrison	1, 3, 6, 9–12
Temple Yamaha	Yamaha	6	(Northern Ireland) William Dunlop	1
Tyco BMW	BMW	7	(Northern Ireland) Michael Laverty	All
Tyco BMW	BMW	21	(England) Christian Iddon	All
Anvil Hire TAG Yamaha	Yamaha	8	(England) Shaun Winfield	All
Anvil Hire TAG Yamaha	Yamaha	11	(England) James Ellison	All
Gulf BMW	BMW	9	(Australia) David Johnson	1, 3
Padgett's Racing	Honda	10	(Isle of Man) Conor Cummins	1, 3
OMG Racing UK LTD	Suzuki	10	(Northern Ireland) Josh Elliott	11-12
OMG Racing UK LTD	Suzuki	44	(England) Gino Rea	All
JG Speedfit Kawasaki	Kawasaki	12	(England) Luke Mossey	All
JG Speedfit Kawasaki	Kawasaki	91	(England) Leon Haslam	All
Smiths Racing	BMW	20	(France) Sylvain Barrier	All
Smiths Racing	BMW	60	(England) Peter Hickman	All
Moto Rapido Racing	Ducati	24	(Scotland) Taylor Mackenzie	1–5
Moto Rapido Racing	Ducati	46	(England) Tommy Bridewell	6–12
McAMS Yamaha	Yamaha	25	(Australia) Josh Brookes	All
McAMS Yamaha	Yamaha	95	(Scotland) Tarran Mackenzie	All
Lloyd & Jones PR Racing	BMW	26	(England) Luke Hedger	5–7, 9
Lloyd & Jones PR Racing	BMW	42	(England) Joe Francis	10–12
Lloyd & Jones PR Racing	BMW	96	(Czech Republic) Jakub Smrž	1–3
RAF Regular & Reserves Kawasaki	Kawasaki	27	(England) Jake Dixon	All
Buildbase Suzuki	Suzuki	28	(England) Bradley Ray	All
Buildbase Suzuki	Suzuki	47	(England) Richard Cooper	All
Gearlink Kawasaki	Kawasaki	32	(Northern Ireland) Carl Phillips	1–4
Gearlink Kawasaki	Kawasaki	89	(England) Fraser Rogers	5–12
RidersMotorcycles.com BMW	BMW	40	(England) Martin Jessopp	1, 3, 6–9, 11–12
Movuno.com Halsall Racing	Suzuki	46	(England) Tommy Bridewell	1–4
Movuno.com Halsall Racing	Suzuki	52	(England) Danny Kent	12
Movuno.com Halsall Racing	Suzuki	68	(England) Tom Neave	9–10
Movuno.com Halsall Racing	Suzuki	69	(England) Chrissy Rouse	5–8, 11
Team WD-40	Kawasaki	55	(England) Mason Law	All
Team 64	Kawasaki	64	(England) Aaron Zanotti	4–12
CF Motorsport	Yamaha	77	(England) Kyle Ryde	1–4
FS-3 Racing	Kawasaki	83	(England) Danny Buchan	All

Key
Regular rider
Wildcard rider
Replacement rider

- All entries used Pirelli tyres.

== Race calendar and results ==
2018 calendar
Main Season
Round		Circuit	Date	Pole position	Fastest lap	Winning rider	Winning team
1	R1	(England) Donington Park GP	1 April	(England) Leon Haslam	(England) Bradley Ray	(England) Bradley Ray	Buildbase Suzuki
1	R2	(England) Donington Park GP	2 April		(England) Leon Haslam	(England) Bradley Ray	Buildbase Suzuki
2	R1	(England) Brands Hatch Indy	15 April	(England) Bradley Ray	(England) Bradley Ray	(England) Shane Byrne	Be Wiser Ducati Racing Team
2	R2	(England) Brands Hatch Indy	15 April		(England) Leon Haslam	(England) Leon Haslam	JG Speedfit Kawasaki
3	R1	(England) Oulton Park	7 May	(England) Shane Byrne	(England) Leon Haslam	(England) Leon Haslam	JG Speedfit Kawasaki
3	R2	(England) Oulton Park	7 May		(Australia) Jason O'Halloran	(England) Leon Haslam	JG Speedfit Kawasaki
4	R1	(England) Snetterton 300	17 June	(England) Bradley Ray	(Northern Ireland) Glenn Irwin	(England) Leon Haslam	JG Speedfit Kawasaki
4	R2	(England) Snetterton 300	17 June		(England) Leon Haslam	(England) Leon Haslam	JG Speedfit Kawasaki
5	R1	(Scotland) Knockhill	8 July	(England) Jake Dixon	(England) Danny Buchan	(England) Jake Dixon	RAF Regular & Reserves Kawasaki
5	R2	(Scotland) Knockhill	8 July		(England) Leon Haslam	(England) Leon Haslam	JG Speedfit Kawasaki
6	R1	(England) Brands Hatch GP	22 July	(Northern Ireland) Glenn Irwin	(Australia) Josh Brookes	(Australia) Josh Brookes	McAMS Yamaha
6	R2	(England) Brands Hatch GP	22 July		(England) Leon Haslam	(Australia) Josh Brookes	McAMS Yamaha
7	R1	(England) Thruxton	5 August	(Northern Ireland) Glenn Irwin	(England) Luke Mossey	(England) Leon Haslam	JG Speedfit Kawasaki
7	R2	(England) Thruxton	5 August		(England) Luke Mossey	(Australia) Josh Brookes	McAMS Yamaha
8	R1	(England) Cadwell Park	19 August	(England) Bradley Ray	(England) Leon Haslam	(England) Leon Haslam	JG Speedfit Kawasaki
8	R2	(England) Cadwell Park	19 August		(England) Jake Dixon	(England) Leon Haslam	JG Speedfit Kawasaki
9	R1	(England) Silverstone National	8–9 September	(England) Bradley Ray	(England) Jake Dixon	(England) Leon Haslam	JG Speedfit Kawasaki
9	R2	(England) Silverstone National	8–9 September		(England) Leon Haslam	(England) Leon Haslam	JG Speedfit Kawasaki
9	R3	(England) Silverstone National	8–9 September		(Scotland) Tarran Mackenzie	(England) Leon Haslam	JG Speedfit Kawasaki
The Showdown
10	R1	(England) Oulton Park	16 September	(England) Jake Dixon	(England) Jake Dixon	(England) Jake Dixon	RAF Regular & Reserves Kawasaki
10	R2	(England) Oulton Park	16 September		(England) Jake Dixon	(England) Jake Dixon	RAF Regular & Reserves Kawasaki
11	R1	(Netherlands) TT Circuit Assen	30 September	(England) Jake Dixon	(England) Peter Hickman	(England) Leon Haslam	JG Speedfit Kawasaki
11	R2	(Netherlands) TT Circuit Assen	30 September		(England) Leon Haslam	(England) Leon Haslam	JG Speedfit Kawasaki
12	R1	(England) Brands Hatch GP	13–14 October	(England) Jake Dixon	(England) Jake Dixon	(Northern Ireland) Glenn Irwin	Be Wiser Ducati Racing Team
12	R2	(England) Brands Hatch GP	13–14 October		(England) Leon Haslam	(England) Leon Haslam	JG Speedfit Kawasaki
12	R3	(England) Brands Hatch GP	13–14 October		(England) Richard Cooper	(England) Richard Cooper	Buildbase Suzuki

NOTE: Following concerns at Silverstone Circuit as a result of the MotoGP round cancellation, the shorter National Circuit was used.

== Championship standings ==
=== Riders' championship ===
Scoring system

Points are awarded to the top fifteen finishers. A rider has to finish the race to earn points.

Position	**1st**	**2nd**	**3rd**	**4th**	**5th**	**6th**	**7th**	**8th**	**9th**	**10th**	**11th**	**12th**	**13th**	**14th**	**15th**
Points	25	20	16	13	11	10	9	8	7	6	5	4	3	2	1

Pos	Rider	Bike	DON (England)		BRH (England)		OUL (England)		SNE (England)		KNO (Scotland)		BRH (England)		THR (England)		CAD (England)		SIL (England)			OUL (England)		ASS (Netherlands)		BRH (England)			Pts
Pos	Rider	Bike	R1	R2	R1	R2	R1	R2	R1	R2	R1	R2	R1	R2	R1	R2	R1	R2	R1	R2	R3	R1	R2	R1	R2	R1	R2	R3	Pts
The Championship Showdown
1	(England) Leon Haslam	Kawasaki	**9**	2	4	1	1	**1**	1	1	2	1	3	3	1	4	1	**1**	1	1	**1**	3	2	1	1	6	1	**6**	699
2	(England) Jake Dixon	Kawasaki	11	12	6	Ret	2	3	3	2	**1**	2	4	4	2	3	3	3	5	**Ret**	3	**1**	**1**	**2**	Ret	**2**	**Ret**	3	629
3	(Northern Ireland) Glenn Irwin	Ducati	6	7	7	2	Ret	5	2	**Ret**	4	4	**2**	2	**5**	9	4	5	2	3	4	12	6	5	4	1	7	Ret	588
4	(Australia) Josh Brookes	Yamaha	12	11	13	5	6	6	4	3	8	Ret	1	**1**	4	1	10	Ret	4	2	6	Ret	5	9	2	7	9	5	584
5	(England) Peter Hickman	BMW	8	Ret	10	14	Ret	11	7	6	10	10	6	10	3	2	7	4	8	Ret	19	8	8	4	**3**	5	6	9	577
6	(England) Bradley Ray	Suzuki	1	**1**	**2**	**7**	4	7	**Ret**	Ret	5	Ret	13	16	Ret	12	**2**	2	**Ret**	14	7	11	Ret	17	7	11	8	11	551
BSB Riders Cup
7	(England) Tommy Bridewell	Suzuki	Ret	14	9	8	8	10	DNS	DNS																			178
7	(England) Tommy Bridewell	Ducati											12	7	11	7	5	Ret	10	6	9	2	3	6	Ret	Ret	2	2	178
8	(Australia) Jason O'Halloran	Honda	7	9	3	Ret	5	2	Ret	DNS	16	DNS	14	15	6	6	13	11	6	4	5	6	DNS	7	11	Ret	3	8	176
9	(England) Christian Iddon	BMW	14	6	5	6	DNS	DNS	9	8	7	6	5	6	13	Ret	6	6	15	5	10	DNS	DNS	8	10	Ret	5	4	167
10	(Scotland) Tarran Mackenzie	Yamaha	18	DNS	11	9	9	Ret	6	Ret	14	11	Ret	5	9	5	8	Ret	3	Ret	2	7	4	3	Ret	3	DNS	DNS	163
11	(England) Danny Buchan	Kawasaki	13	4	12	12	7	8	5	5	3	**3**	8	8	Ret	Ret	Ret	8	13	12	12	DNS	DNS	13	9	9	Ret	DNS	147
12	(England) Richard Cooper	Suzuki	16	13	Ret	Ret	10	9	10	7	9	7	7	Ret	Ret	14	11	9	Ret	10	8	13	Ret	12	5	Ret	4	1	140
13	(Northern Ireland) Michael Laverty	BMW	10	10	8	3	Ret	13	Ret	9	6	5	10	11	Ret	13	14	7	14	Ret	Ret	5	Ret	11	Ret	10	Ret	Ret	116
14	(England) James Ellison	Yamaha	3	Ret	16	11	11	12	8	Ret	13	9	Ret	9	12	15	9	Ret	Ret	13	11	9	10	10	8	8	Ret	Ret	110
15	(England) Shane Byrne	Ducati	2	5	1	4	**3**	4																					98
16	(England) Luke Mossey	Kawasaki	5	8	15	13	Ret	Ret	Ret	DNS	12	12	Ret	13	7	**8**	12	10	7	8	DNS	Ret	7	14	15	12	11	Ret	97
17	(Northern Ireland) Andrew Irwin	Ducati							Ret	10	11	8	9	12	Ret	11	Ret	Ret	11	9	Ret	4	9	16	6	4	Ret	Ret	80
18	(England) Dan Linfoot	Honda	4	3	DNS	DNS			Ret	4	Ret	13	Ret	DNS					12	11	Ret	10	11	15	Ret	DNS	DNS	DNS	66
19	(England) Gino Rea	Suzuki	17	15	19	17	13	Ret	14	11	17	15	16	17	Ret	17	16	Ret	9	7	14	14	14	Ret	16	13	Ret	7	45
20	(England) Mason Law	Kawasaki	20	Ret	18	18	15	Ret	12	13	15	14	15	18	8	10	DNS	DNS	16	15	13	17	13	Ret	Ret	17	12	13	40
21	(France) Sylvain Barrier	BMW	19	17	20	19	16	19	13	14	Ret	17	Ret	Ret	14	18	18	14	17	16	15	DNS	DNS	20	13	20	Ret	10	19
22	(England) Chrissy Rouse	Suzuki									Ret	Ret	11	14	10	Ret	Ret	DNS						DNS	DNS				13
23	(Scotland) Taylor Mackenzie	Ducati	15	16	17	15	Ret	14	11	12	DNS	DNS																	13
24	(England) Dean Harrison	Kawasaki	21	Ret			17	18					17	20					19	17	Ret	Ret	12	19	12	14	Ret	Ret	10
25	(England) Shaun Winfield	Yamaha	26	Ret	22	21	20	20	15	15	Ret	18	20	23	16	Ret	19	15	22	19	21	Ret	16	22	18	Ret	13	14	8
26	(Northern Ireland) Josh Elliott	Suzuki																						18	Ret	15	10	Ret	7
27	(Northern Ireland) Carl Phillips	Kawasaki	24	Ret	21	10	Ret	Ret	DNS	DNS																			6
28	(England) Tom Neave	Honda													Ret	Ret	15	12											5
28	(England) Tom Neave	Suzuki																	18	Ret	16	18	Ret						5
29	(Japan) Ryuichi Kiyonari	Honda					12	15																					5
30	(England) Danny Kent	Suzuki																								Ret	Ret	12	4
31	(England) Martin Jessopp	BMW	23	DNS			18	16					Ret	19	15	16	Ret	13	Ret	18	17			Ret	DNS	Ret	Ret	DNS	4
32	(Czech Republic) Jakub Smrž	BMW	DNS	Ret	14	16	14	Ret																					4
33	(England) Fraser Rogers	Kawasaki									Ret	16	19	21	17	Ret	17	Ret	20	DNS	DNS	15	15	21	14	Ret	Ret	DNS	4
34	(England) Aaron Zanotti	Kawasaki							16	Ret	Ret	DNS	Ret	24	Ret	Ret	20	Ret	Ret	Ret	20	Ret	Ret	Ret	19	Ret	14	15	3
	(England) Joe Francis	BMW																				16	Ret	Ret	17	18	Ret	Ret	0
	(England) Kyle Ryde	Yamaha	Ret	19	Ret	20	Ret	17	DNS	DNS																			0
	(Australia) David Johnson	BMW	22	18			19	Ret																					0
	(England) Luke Hedger	BMW									DNS	DNS	18	22	18	19			21	Ret	Ret								0
	(Isle of Man) Conor Cummins	Honda	25	20			21	21																					0
	(Northern Ireland) William Dunlop	Yamaha	27	Ret																									0
Pos	Rider	Bike	DON (England)		BRH (England)		OUL (England)		SNE (England)		KNO (Scotland)		BRH (England)		THR (England)		CAD (England)		SIL (England)			OUL (England)		ASS (Netherlands)		BRH (England)			Pts

Colour	Result
Gold	Winner
Silver	Second place
Bronze	Third place
Green	Points classification
Blue	Non-points classification
Blue	Non-classified finish (NC)
Purple	Retired, not classified (Ret)
Red	Did not qualify (DNQ)
Red	Did not pre-qualify (DNPQ)
Black	Disqualified (DSQ)
White	Did not start (DNS)
White	Withdrew (WD)
White	Race cancelled (C)
Blank	Did not practice (DNP)
Blank	Did not arrive (DNA)
Blank	Excluded (EX)

**Bold** – Pole position
Italics – Fastest lap
