= Bradley Ray =

British motorcycle racer (born 1997)

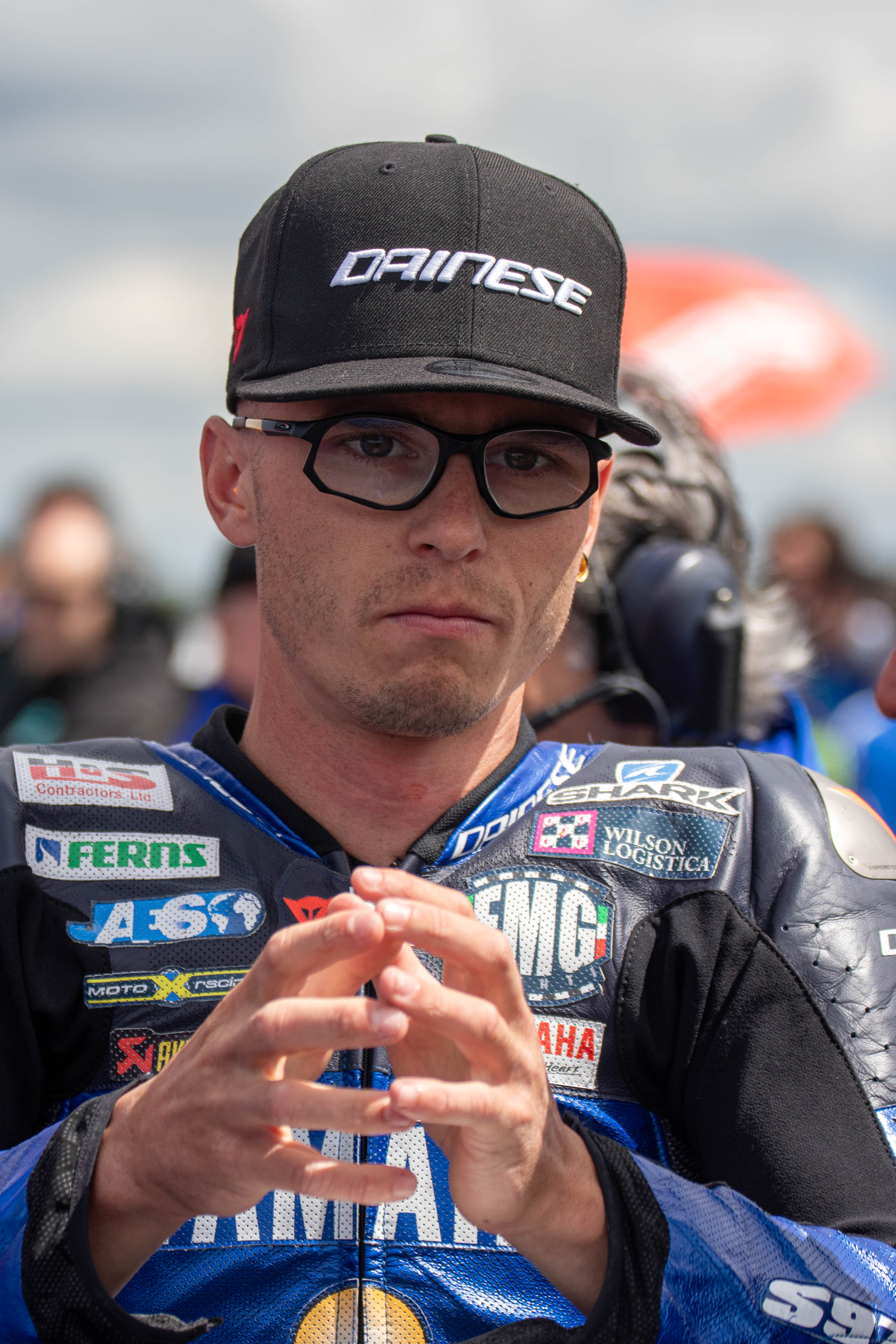
- Ray in 2023
- Born: 16 May 1997 (age 29); Ashford, Kent, England
- Current team: McAMS Yamaha
- Bike number: 28
- Website: www.brad-ray.co.uk
Motorcycle racing career statistics
Moto2 World Championship
Active years	2015
Manufacturers	FTR
2015 championship position	NC (0 pts)
Starts / Wins / Podiums / Poles / F. laps / Points; 1 / 0 / 0 / 0 / 0 / 0
Superbike World Championship
Active years	2023–2024
Manufacturers	Yamaha
2024 championship position	21st (14 pts)
Starts / Wins / Podiums / Poles / F. laps / Points; 60 / 0 / 0 / 0 / 0 / 33
British Superbike Championship
Active years	2017–2022, 2025–present
Manufacturers	Yamaha
Championships	1 (2022)
2026 championship position	2nd (457 pts)
Starts / Wins / Podiums / Poles / F. laps / Points; 223 / 25 / 72 / 42 / 39 / 3289

Bradley Callum Ray (born 16 May 1997 in Ashford, Kent, England) is a British motorcycle racer who competes in the British Superbike Championship for McAMS Yamaha. He won the 2022 British Superbike Championship, and rode for Yamaha Motoxracing WorldSBK Team in the World Superbike Championship between 2023 and 2024.

== Career ==
Ray had one ride in the Moto2 class at the 2015 British GP, as wildcard entry. He had another wildcard entry in early 2018 at the UK round of the World Superbike Championship at Donington Park, finishing Race 1 in 14th place, and 15th in Race 2. From 2017, he raced in the British Superbike Championship aboard a Suzuki GSX-R1000 for Hawk Racing sponsored by Buildbase, continuing for the 2018 and 2019 seasons. He won his first Superbike-level race on 1 April at Donington Park.

In November 2019, Ray confirmed that he would join Taylor Mackenzie at TAS BMW for the 2020 British Superbike Championship season.

In November 2020, Ray joined the OMG Racing team for the 2021 season, and was contracted to ride for the same team during 2022, switching from BMW to Yamaha machinery as used in 2021 by the McAMS team.

After winning the 2022 BSB Championship, Ray was contracted to ride in European rounds of World Superbikes in 2023, continuing during 2024 with the same team. He then returned to the British Superbike Championship in 2025 and lead the championship after a dominant five wins in the first six races.

== Selected racing achievements ==
- 2011 - 6th, British 125cc Championship #128 (Honda RS125R)
- 2012 - 7th, Red Bull MotoGP Rookies Cup #28 (KTM FRR 125)
- 2012 - 2nd, British MotoStar Championship #28 (Honda RS125R)
- 2013 - 11th, Red Bull MotoGP Rookies Cup #28 (KTM RC250GP)
- 2013 - 15th, CEV Moto3 Championship #82 (Honda NSF250R)
- 2014 - 4th, Red Bull MotoGP Rookies Cup #28 (KTM RC250GP)
- 2014 - 11th, CEV Moto3 Championship #28 (FTR/KTM Moto3)
- 2015 - NC, FIM CEV Moto2 European Championship #82 (FTR Moto2)
- 2015 - 13th, National Superstock 600 Championship #82 (Kawasaki ZX-6R)
- 2016 - 3rd, British Supersport Championship #28 (Yamaha YZF-R6)
- 2017 - 11th, British Superbike Championship #28 (Suzuki GSX-R1000)
- 2017 - 1st, Mallory Park Race of the Year #28 (Suzuki GSX-R1000)
- 2018 - 6th, British Superbike Championship #28 (Suzuki GSX-R1000)

== Career statistics ==
=== British 125 Championship ===
Year	Bike	1	2	3	4	5	6	7	8	9	10	11	12	Pos	Pts
2011	Honda/Aztec GP	BRH; 19	OUL; 13	CRO; 11	THR; 4	KNO; 7	SNE; 20	OUL; 7	BRH; DNS	CAD; 6	DON; 2	SIL; 6	BRH; 5	**6th**	**90**

=== Red Bull MotoGP Rookies Cup ===
==== Races by year ====
(key) (Races in bold indicate pole position, races in italics indicate fastest lap)

Year	1	2	3	4	5	6	7	8	9	10	11	12	13	14	15	Pos	Pts
2012	SPA1; Ret	SPA2; 5	POR1; 5	POR2; 19	GBR1; 2	GBR2; 6	NED1; 7	NED2; 5	GER1; 20	GER2; 10	CZE1; 7	CZE2; 7	**RSM**; 9	ARA1; 4	ARA2; 9	7th	123
2013	AME1; 1	AME2; 4	JER1; 8	JER2; 6	ASS1; Ret	ASS2; Ret	SAC1; 10	SAC2; 13	BRN; 9	SIL1; Ret	SIL2; 11	MIS; Ret	ARA1; 6	ARA2; 8		11th	95
2014	JER1; 9	JER1; 11	MUG; Ret	ASS1; 3	ASS2; 6	SAC1; 6	SAC2; 2	BRN1; 4	BRN2; 4	SIL1; 5	SIL2; 4	MIS; 7	ARA1; 7	ARA2; 3		4th	152

=== FIM CEV Moto3 Championship ===
==== Races by year ====
(key) (Races in bold indicate pole position; races in italics indicate fastest lap)

Year	Bike	1	2	3	4	5	6	7	8	9	Pos	Pts
2012	Honda	JER	NAV	ARA	CAT	ALB1	ALB2	VAL; 15			32nd	1
2013	Honda	CAT1; 7	CAT2; 9	ARA; 17	ALB1; 10	ALB2; 17	NAV; 15	VAL1; Ret	VAL1; 20	JER; 13	15th	26

=== FIM CEV Moto3 Junior World Championship ===
==== Races by year ====
(key) (Races in bold indicate pole position; races in italics indicate fastest lap)

Year	Bike	1	2	3	4	5	6	7	8	9	10	11	Pos	Pts
2014	FTR/KTM	JER1; Ret	JER2; 13	LMS; 7	ARA; 9	CAT1; 11	CAT2; 9	ALB; 8	NAV	ALG; 5	VAL1; 14	VAL2; Ret	11th	52

=== FIM Moto2 European Championship ===
==== Races by year ====
(key) (Races in bold indicate pole position) (Races in italics indicate fastest lap)

Year	Bike	1	2	3	4	5	6	7	8	9	10	11	Pos	Pts
2015	Vyrus	ALG1; 20	ALG2; 16	CAT; Ret	ARA1	ARA2	ALB	NAV1; 23	NAV2; 25	JER	VAL1	VAL2	NC	0

=== Grand Prix motorcycle racing ===
==== By season ====
Season	Class	Motorcycle	Team	Number	Race	Win	Podium	Pole	FLap	Pts	Plcd
2015	Moto2	FTR	FAB-Racing	28	1	0	0	0	0	0	NC
Total					**1**	**0**	**0**	**0**	**0**	**0**	

==== Races by year ====
(key) (Races in bold indicate pole position, races in italics indicate fastest lap)

Year	Class	Bike	1	2	3	4	5	6	7	8	9	10	11	12	13	14	15	16	17	18	Pos	Pts
2015	Moto2	FTR	QAT	AME	ARG	SPA	FRA	ITA	CAT	NED	GER	IND	CZE	GBR; Ret	RSM	ARA	JPN	AUS	MAL	VAL	NC	0

=== Superbike World Championship ===
==== By season ====
Season	Class	Motorcycle	Team	Race	Win	Podium	Pole	FLap	Pts	Plcd
2023	SBK	YZF-R1	Yamaha Motoxracing WorldSBK Team	24	0	0	0	0	19	20th
2024	SBK	YZF-R1	Yamaha Motoxracing WorldSBK Team	36	0	0	0	0	14	21st
Total				**60**	**0**	**0**	**0**	**0**	**33**	

==== Races by year ====
(key) (Races in bold indicate pole position) (Races in italics indicate fastest lap)

Year	Bike	1			2			3			4			5			6			7			8			9			10			11			12			Pos	Pts
Year	Bike	R1	SR	R2	R1	SR	R2	R1	SR	R2	R1	SR	R2	R1	SR	R2	R1	SR	R2	R1	SR	R2	R1	SR	R2	R1	SR	R2	R1	SR	R2	R1	SR	R2	R1	SR	R2	Pos	Pts
2023	Yamaha	AUS	AUS	AUS	INA	INA	INA	NED; 18	NED; 16	NED; Ret	SPA; 13	SPA; 14	SPA; 15	ITA; 18	ITA; 14	ITA; Ret	GBR; Ret	GBR; 12	GBR; 13	IMO; 15	IMO; 16	IMO; 6	CZE	CZE	CZE	FRA; Ret	FRA; 15	FRA; 17	SPA; 18	SPA; 18	SPA; 17	POR; 17	POR; 17	POR; 18	JER	JER	JER	20th	19
2024	Yamaha	AUS; 21	AUS; 21	AUS; 15	SPA; 18	SPA; 22	SPA; Ret	NED; 15	NED; 20	NED; 17	ITA; 18	ITA; 20	ITA; 17	GBR; 16	GBR; 19	GBR; 18	CZE; 19	CZE; 16	CZE; 15	POR; 17	POR; 18	POR; 18	FRA; Ret	FRA; 15	FRA; 17	ITA; 11	ITA; 15	ITA; 14	SPA; 15	SPA; 16	SPA; 16	POR; 16	POR; 18	POR; 14	SPA; 17	SPA; 16	SPA; 15	21st	14

=== British Superbike Championship ===
==== By year ====
(key) (Races in bold indicate pole position; races in italics indicate fastest lap)

Year	Make	1		2		3			4		5		6			7		8			9			10		11		12			Pos	Pts
Year	Make	R1	R2	R1	R2	R1	R2	R3	R1	R2	R1	R2	R1	R2	R3	R1	R2	R1	R2	R3	R1	R2	R3	R1	R2	R1	R2	R1	R2	R3	Pos	Pts
2017	Suzuki	DON; Ret	DON; 14	BHI; 12	BHI; 8	OUL; Ret	OUL; Ret		KNO; Ret	KNO; 12	SNE; 9	SNE; 11	BHGP; 10	BHGP; 8		THR; 8	THR; 4	CAD; Ret	CAD; 14		SIL; 11	SIL; 10	SIL; 6	OUL; 7	OUL; 3	ASS; 6	ASS; 10	BHGP; 9	BHGP; Ret	BHGP; 9	11th	140
2018	Suzuki	DON; 1	**DON**; 1	**BHI**; 2	**BHI**; 7	OUL; 4	OUL; 7		**SNE**; Ret	SNE; Ret	KNO; 5	KNO; Ret	BHGP; 13	BHGP; 16		THR; Ret	THR; 12	**CAD**; 2	CAD; 2		**SIL**; Ret	SIL; 14	SIL; 7	OUL; 11	OUL; Ret	ASS; 17	ASS; 7	BHGP; 11	BHGP; 8	BHGP; 11	6th	551
2019	Suzuki	SIL; 16	SIL; 10	OUL; 14	OUL; 12	DON; 17	DON; 13	DON; 9	BRH; 17	BRH; Ret	KNO; 6	KNO; Ret	SNE; 13	SNE; 13		THR; 12	THR; 13	CAD; Ret	CAD; Ret		OUL; 2	OUL; 4	**OUL**; 2	ASS; 9	ASS; 10	DON; Ret	DON; 6	BHGP; 15	BHGP; 14	BHGP; 14	11th	126

Year	Bike	1			2			3			4			5			6			7			8			9			10			11			Pos	Pts
Year	Bike	R1	R2	R3	R1	R2	R3	R1	R2	R3	R1	R2	R3	R1	R2	R3	R1	R2	R3	R1	R2	R3	R1	R2	R3	R1	R2	R3	R1	R2	R3	R1	R2	R3	Pos	Pts
2020	BMW	DON; Ret	DON; 12	DON; 14	SNE; 5	SNE; 10	SNE; 9	SIL; 12	SIL; 5	SIL; 13	OUL; 7	OUL; 8	OUL; 7	DON; DNS	DON; DNS	DON; DNS	BHGP; Ret	BHGP; Ret	BHGP; 14																13th	76
2021	BMW	OUL; Ret	OUL; 5	OUL; Ret	KNO; 4	KNO; 9	KNO; 5	BHGP; 7	BHGP; 12	BHGP; 13	THR; 7	THR; 4	THR; 10	DON; 10	DON; 2	DON; 16	CAD; 13	CAD; 8	CAD; 8	SNE; 9	SNE; 12	SNE; 9	SIL; 5	SIL; 4	SIL; 7	OUL; 9	OUL; 7	OUL; 3	DON; 9	DON; 12	DON; 14	BHGP; 10	BHGP; 12	BHGP; 8	10th	245
2022	Yamaha	SIL; 3	SIL; Ret	SIL; 2	OUL; 1	OUL; 1	OUL; 3	DON; 3	DON; 2	DON; 2	KNO; 1	KNO; 4	KNO; 2	BRH; 4	BRH; 4	BRH; 4	THR; 3	THR; 3	THR; 2	CAD; 1	CAD; 2	CAD; 2	SNE; 1	SNE; 1	SNE; 1	OUL; 1	OUL; 3	OUL; 5	DON; 4	DON; 2	DON; 1	BRH; 5	BRH; Ret	BRH; 6	**1st**	**1192**

Year	Bike	1			2			3			4			5			6			7			8				9			10			11			Pos	Pts
Year	Bike	R1	R2	R3	R1	R2	R3	R1	R2	R3	R1	R2	R3	R1	R2	R3	R1	R2	R3	R1	R2	R3	R1	R2	R3	R4	R1	R2	R3	R1	R2	R3	R1	R2	R3	Pos	Pts
2025	Yamaha	**OUL**; 1	**OUL**; 3	OUL; C	**DON**; 1	DON; 1	DON; 1	**SNE**; 1	**SNE**; 1	**SNE**; 1	**KNO**; 1	**KNO**; 1	**KNO**; 2	**BRH**; 1	BRH; Ret	**BRH**; 4	THR; 8	THR; 3	**THR**; 2	**CAD**; 1	**CAD**; Ret	CAD; 12	DON; 9	DON; 4	DON; 2	**DON**; 7	**ASS**; Ret	ASS; 3	ASS; 6	OUL; 9	OUL; 1	**OUL**; 2	**BRH**; 2	**BRH**; 3	BRH; 2	2nd	502
2026	Yamaha	OUL; 3	OUL; 3	**OUL**; 3	DON; 7	**DON**; 4	DON; 4	KNO; Ret	KNO; 2	**KNO**; 2	**SNE**; 1	SNE; Ret	SNE; 3	BRH; 8	BRH; 4	BRH; 8	OUL; 1	**OUL**; 2	OUL; 3	THR; 4	**THR**; 3	**THR**; 2	**CAD**; Ret	CAD; 2	**CAD**; 2		ASS; 5	ASS; 2	**ASS**; 2	DON; 3	DON; 4	DON; 4	BRH; 7	BRH; 2	BRH; 14	3rd	457
