= 2010 British Superbike Championship =

British motorcycle racing season

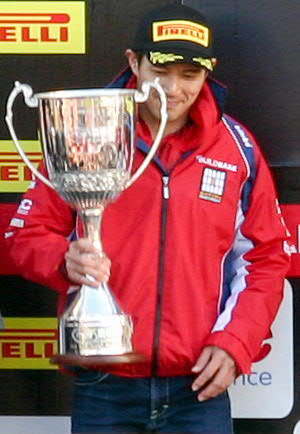
2010 champion, Ryuichi Kiyonari

The 2010 British Superbike season was the 23rd British Superbike Championship season. The season commenced on 5 April at Brands Hatch and ended on 10 October at Oulton Park after 26 races at twelve meetings held in England and Scotland. Due to the economic climate many rule changes were discussed including one bike per rider and the banning of electronic aids. The season featured a new Evo Class for less-developed bikes and a new 'Showdown' points system to keep the championship close until the end.

After a spell in the Superbike World Championship, 2006 and 2007 champion Ryuichi Kiyonari returned to the championship and duly picked up his third championship title, with superior results in the seven-race Showdown element of the championship; winning three races, to add to four he picked up in the first part of the season. His HM Plant Honda teammate Josh Brookes finished as runner-up, taking five victories as he finished 24 points behind Kiyonari. Tommy Hill finished third, having tailed off from a positive start to the season, having finished each of the first six races in the top three placings. He ended the season with four victories and 15 podiums. Michael Laverty finished fourth in the championship with two wins, with the Ducati of Michael Rutter – another double race-winner – finishing in between Laverty and his teammate Alastair Seeley, who took a single victory at Brands Hatch. Three other riders took race victories during the season; Swan Honda racers James Ellison and Stuart Easton took three wins between them, as they finished the season in seventh and ninth places respectively, while Tom Sykes took two wins on a single wildcard outing from his normal World Superbike commitments.

The début season of the Evolution Class was, for the most part, a two-rider battle for the championship. Steve Brogan, riding a BMW for Jentin Racing and Hudson Kennaugh, riding a Kawasaki for Malcolm Ashley Racing and an Aprilia for Splitlath Motorsport, duked it out for class glory. By season's end, just three points separated the two riders, with Brogan finishing as victor, winning the class on twelve occasions. Kennaugh won seven, including the best result for an Evo rider, finishing in ninth place in the second race of the first Oulton Park meeting. Gary Johnson, Chris Burns and David Anthony also won two races, while Pauli Pekkanen took a single victory at Brands Hatch.

== Rule changes ==
New for 2010 was an "Evolution Class", to replace the Privateers Cup, and was designed for teams to enter the championship for a reduced cost. The new rules attracted larger numbers than the Privateers Cup, and also attracted three new manufacturers in KTM, Aprilia and BMW. The Evo rules allowed for full Superbike rolling chassis allied to stock engines and a control ECU which eliminates rider aids.

Series organisers MotorSport Vision announced a series of rule changes on 3 February 2010. Qualifying was altered, with the "Roll for Pole" only setting the grid for race one of each weekend. This was due to the race two grid being set by the fastest laps of each rider in race one. Also introduced was a "second chance" system if a rider crashes on lap one, that rider only dropped eight places from where they started the first race. At the triple-race meetings, the same rules applied for race two, but were also applied for race three.

=== Championship restructure ===
Perhaps the biggest rule change was the dividing of the championship into two parts. The first nine meetings, totalling nineteen races, formed the "Main Season" of the championship, before the final three meetings, the remaining seven races, make up "The Showdown". The championship change was introduced after Leon Camier clinched the 2009 title with four races to spare, thus introducing a crescendo of competition.

The normal FIM point-scoring system still applied, with 25 for the winner all the way down to a single point for fifteenth place. At the end of the Main Season, all riders dropped their two worst scores, which had to be from events they qualified for. From this points order, the first six riders in the championship standings were elevated to a new base level and became the Title Fighters for the final three events and seven races of the championship.

The six-rider format was based on the 2007–10 NASCAR Playoffs format of rewarding wins with bonus points for the playoff. Unlike the NASCAR Playoff format where only wins awarded bonus points, any top-three finish in the Main Season was awarded bonus points, referred as Podium Credits. A win was worth three bonus points, second place was worth two bonus points, and third place was worth one bonus point. Each Title Fighter started The Showdown with 500 points and bonus points earned for each podium finish. The standard points scoring format from the Main Season then continued for The Showdown, with all points scores from the final seven races counting. All riders outside of the Title Fighters continued to race for the BSB Riders' Cup, continuing to add to their points total from the end of the Main Season. This also applied to the new Evolution class.

=== Qualifying changes ===
The Swan Combi Roll for Pole remained, but set the grid for Race 1 only. All riders take to the track for Q1 over 20 minutes. The field was then whittled down to 20 riders in Q2 over 12 minutes, and then the final 8 minutes shoot-out for pole position by the top 10 riders in Q3. Significantly all the riders were on race rubber during all the qualifying sessions. The Race 2 grid was then established by the order of the riders best lap times set during Race 1. If a rider suffered a crash or mechanical failure before the end of the first lap in Race 1, the rider lined up for Race 2 in their Race 1 starting grid position plus 8 "penalty places".

== Calendar ==
- A provisional calendar had been released on 11 October 2009, with twelve rounds listed, including a provisional date at Donington Park due to renovation of the circuit. Two months later, a revised calendar was released, with Donington Park losing the rights to hold their race on 10–12 September, after Donington Ventures Leisure Ltd was placed into administration. These dates were latterly used for a round at Croft, with a second meeting at Cadwell Park replacing the original Croft date.

2010 Calendar
Main Season
Round		Circuit	Date	Pole position	Fastest lap	Winning rider	Winning team
1	R1	(England) Brands Hatch Indy	5 April	(Japan) Ryuichi Kiyonari	(Australia) Josh Brookes	(England) Tommy Hill	Worx Crescent Suzuki
1	R2	(England) Brands Hatch Indy	5 April		(Northern Ireland) Alastair Seeley	(England) James Ellison	Swan Honda
2	R1	(England) Thruxton	18 April	(England) Tommy Hill	(England) Martin Jessopp	(England) Tommy Hill	Worx Crescent Suzuki
2	R2	(England) Thruxton	18 April		(England) Tommy Hill	(Australia) Josh Brookes	HM Plant Honda
3	R1	(England) Oulton Park	3 May	(England) Tommy Hill	(Japan) Ryuichi Kiyonari	(Scotland) Stuart Easton	Swan Honda
3	R2	(England) Oulton Park	3 May		(Northern Ireland) Michael Laverty	(Northern Ireland) Michael Laverty	Relentless Suzuki by TAS
4	R1	(England) Cadwell Park	23 May	(England) Tommy Hill	(Japan) Ryuichi Kiyonari	(Japan) Ryuichi Kiyonari	HM Plant Honda
4	R2	(England) Cadwell Park	23 May		(Australia) Josh Brookes	(Australia) Josh Brookes	HM Plant Honda
5	R1	(England) Mallory Park	27 June	(Japan) Ryuichi Kiyonari	(Japan) Ryuichi Kiyonari	(Japan) Ryuichi Kiyonari	HM Plant Honda
5	R2	(England) Mallory Park	27 June		(Japan) Ryuichi Kiyonari	(Japan) Ryuichi Kiyonari	HM Plant Honda
6	R1	(Scotland) Knockhill	4 July	(Australia) Josh Brookes	(England) Michael Rutter	(England) Michael Rutter	Riders Motorcycles.com
6	R2	(Scotland) Knockhill	4 July	Race Cancelled^{1}			
7	R1	(England) Snetterton	17 July		(Australia) Josh Brookes	(Australia) Josh Brookes	HM Plant Honda
7	R2	(England) Snetterton	18 July	(Australia) Josh Brookes	(Australia) Josh Brookes	(Australia) Josh Brookes	HM Plant Honda
7	R3	(England) Snetterton	18 July		(Japan) Ryuichi Kiyonari	(Japan) Ryuichi Kiyonari	HM Plant Honda
8	R1	(England) Brands Hatch GP	7 August	(England) Michael Rutter	(Northern Ireland) Alastair Seeley	(Northern Ireland) Alastair Seeley	Relentless Suzuki by TAS
8	R2	(England) Brands Hatch GP	8 August		(Northern Ireland) Michael Laverty	(England) Tom Sykes	Kawasaki World Superbike
8	R3	(England) Brands Hatch GP	8 August		(England) Michael Rutter	(England) Tom Sykes	Kawasaki World Superbike
9	R1	(England) Cadwell Park	30 August	(England) Tommy Hill	(Australia) Josh Brookes	(England) Tommy Hill	Worx Crescent Suzuki
9	R2	(England) Cadwell Park	30 August		(Japan) Ryuichi Kiyonari	(Australia) Josh Brookes	HM Plant Honda
The Showdown
10	R1	(England) Croft	12 September	(England) Tommy Hill	(England) Tommy Hill	(England) Tommy Hill	Worx Crescent Suzuki
10	R2	(England) Croft	12 September		(England) Tommy Hill	(Northern Ireland) Michael Laverty	Relentless Suzuki by TAS
11	R1	(England) Silverstone Arena GP	26 September	(Australia) Josh Brookes	(England) Michael Rutter	(England) Michael Rutter	Riders Motorcycles.com
11	R2	(England) Silverstone Arena GP	26 September		(England) James Ellison	(England) James Ellison	Swan Honda
12	R1	(England) Oulton Park	9 October	(England) Tommy Hill	(England) Tommy Hill	(Japan) Ryuichi Kiyonari	HM Plant Honda
12	R2	(England) Oulton Park	10 October		(Japan) Ryuichi Kiyonari	(Japan) Ryuichi Kiyonari	HM Plant Honda
12	R3	(England) Oulton Park	10 October		(England) James Ellison	(Japan) Ryuichi Kiyonari	HM Plant Honda

Notes:

1. – The second race at Knockhill was cancelled due to bad weather conditions. As a result, the race was run at the next round of the championship at Snetterton, with the second race grid positions standing for the race.

== Entry list ==
2010 Entry List
Team	Bike	No	Riders	Class	Rounds
Swan Honda	Honda CBR1000RR	2	(England) James Ellison		1–2, 5–12
Swan Honda	Honda CBR1000RR	3	(Scotland) Stuart Easton		All
HM Plant Honda	Honda CBR1000RR	4	(Australia) Josh Brookes		All
HM Plant Honda	Honda CBR1000RR	8	(Japan) Ryuichi Kiyonari		All
SMT Honda	Honda CBR1000RR	5	(England) Christian Iddon		1–6
SMT Honda	Honda CBR1000RR	9	(England) Chris Walker		7–12
Riders Racing Ducati	Ducati 1198	6	(England) Michael Rutter		All
Riders Racing Ducati	Ducati 1198	40	(England) Martin Jessopp		1–5, 12
Relentless Suzuki	Suzuki GSX-R1000	7	(Northern Ireland) Michael Laverty		All
Relentless Suzuki	Suzuki GSX-R1000	34	(Northern Ireland) Alastair Seeley		All
CW Racing	Suzuki GSX-R1000	9	(England) Chris Walker		1–2, 5–6
MSS Colchester Kawasaki	Kawasaki Ninja ZX-10R	9	(England) Chris Walker		3–4
MSS Colchester Kawasaki	Kawasaki Ninja ZX-10R	17	(England) Simon Andrews		1, 5–12
MSS Colchester Kawasaki	Kawasaki Ninja ZX-10R	43	(England) Howie Mainwaring		2
MSS Colchester Kawasaki	Kawasaki Ninja ZX-10R	101	(England) Gary Mason		All
Buildbase Kawasaki	Kawasaki Ninja ZX-10R	10	(Northern Ireland) John Laverty		All
Buildbase Kawasaki	Kawasaki Ninja ZX-10R	11	(England) Adam Jenkinson		All
Magic Bullet Racing	Suzuki GSX-R1000	14	(England) Michael Howarth	E	1–3
Magic Bullet Racing	Suzuki GSX-R1000	20	(Australia) David Johnson	E	1–3
Graphic UK/Trademte Honda	Honda CBR1000RR	15	(England) Matt Layt		7
Adept Water	Kawasaki Ninja ZX-10R	15	(England) Leon Hunt	E	11–12
East Coast Racing	Yamaha YZF-R1	16	(England) Karl Harris		5
Jentin Racing	BMW S1000RR	19	(England) Steve Brogan	E	1, 3–12
Jentin Racing	BMW S1000RR	19	(England) Steve Brogan		2
Two Brothers Racing	Kawasaki Ninja ZX-10R	20	(Australia) David Johnson	E	4–7
Becsport/Two Wheel Tuning	Suzuki GSX-R1000	20	(Australia) David Johnson	E	8–11
Becsport/Two Wheel Tuning	Suzuki GSX-R1000	66	(England) James Webb	E	12
Doodson Motorsport	Honda CBR1000RR	21	(England) Tom Tunstall		1–11
MIST Suzuki	Suzuki GSX-R1000	23	(Australia) Chris Seaton	E	12
MIST Suzuki	Suzuki GSX-R1000	25	(Australia) David Anthony	E	1–4
Wilson Craig Racing	Honda CBR1000RR	29	(England) Guy Martin		3
Astro-Chase SST Racing	Kawasaki Ninja ZX-10R	32	(England) Peter Ward	E	1, 3–9
Astro-Chase SST Racing	Kawasaki Ninja ZX-10R	32	(England) Peter Ward		2
Worx Crescent Suzuki	Suzuki GSX-R1000	33	(England) Tommy Hill		All
Worx Crescent Suzuki	Suzuki GSX-R1000	71	(Japan) Yukio Kagayama		1–3, 8–12
Splitlath Motorsport	Aprilia RSV 4	35	(England) Chris Burns	E	1–8, 10–12
Splitlath Motorsport	Aprilia RSV 4	35	(England) Chris Burns		9
Splitlath Motorsport	Aprilia RSV 4	53	(England) Joe Burns	E	1–3
Splitlath Motorsport	Aprilia RSV 4	56	(South Africa) Hudson Kennaugh	E	7–8, 10–12
Splitlath Motorsport	Aprilia RSV 4	56	(South Africa) Hudson Kennaugh		9
Bournemouth Kawasaki	Kawasaki Ninja ZX-10R	37	(England) James Hillier	E	10–12
Quay Garage Racing	Honda CBR1000RR	46	(England) Tommy Bridewell		All
D.H.R Free-Brothers Honda	Honda CBR1000RR	50	(Northern Ireland) David Haire		12
Quattro Plant	Honda CBR1000RR	54	(Republic of Ireland) Steve Heneghan	E	1–2
Quattro Plant	Honda CBR1000RR	54	(Republic of Ireland) Steve Heneghan		4–12
Motorpoint / Henderson Yamaha	Yamaha YZF-R1	55	(Northern Ireland) Ian Lowry		3–4
Motorpoint / Henderson Yamaha	Yamaha YZF-R1	65	(France) Loris Baz		10–12
Motorpoint / Henderson Yamaha	Yamaha YZF-R1	99	(England) Dan Linfoot		All
Motorpoint / Henderson Yamaha	Yamaha YZF-R1	100	(England) Neil Hodgson		1–2
Motorpoint / Henderson Yamaha	Yamaha YZF-R1	188	(Australia) Andrew Pitt		5–8
MAR Kawasaki	Kawasaki Ninja ZX-10R	56	(South Africa) Hudson Kennaugh	E	1–6
Ultimate Racing	Yamaha YZF-R1	60	(England) Peter Hickman		All
Red Viper Spike	Suzuki GSX-R1000	64	(England) Aaron Zanotti	E	All
SMR Racing	Yamaha YZF-R1	66	(England) Steve Mercer		1
Kawasaki World Superbike	Kawasaki Ninja ZX-10R	66	(England) Tom Sykes		8
Kawasaki World Superbike	Kawasaki Ninja ZX-10R	87	(Northern Ireland) Ian Lowry		8
PR Racing M/C & Moore	Yamaha YZF-R1	68	(England) Luke Jones		1–3, 7
AIM Racing	Suzuki GSX-R1000	69	(England) Gary Johnson	E	1–3, 5–12
Motomob – O'Brien Hifi	Yamaha YZF-R1	72	(England) Michael O'Brien	E	2–4, 7–9, 11
Close Print Finance Honda	Honda CBR1000RR	75	(England) Craig Fitzpatrick	E	1–3, 5–12
777 RR Motorsport	Suzuki GSX-R1000	77	(Finland) Pauli Pekkanen	E	All
Redline KTM	KTM 1190 RC8	88	(England) James Edmeades	E	1, 5–12
Redline KTM	KTM 1190 RC8	88	(England) Dave Wood		2
Redline KTM	KTM 1190 RC8	88	(England) Alex Lowes	E	3–4

Icon	Class
E	Evolution Class

Key
Regular Rider
Wildcard Rider
Replacement Rider

== Championship standings ==
=== Riders Championship ===
Pos	Rider	Bike	BHI (England)		THR (England)		OUL (England)		CAD (England)		MAL (England)		KNO (Scotland)		SNE (England)			BHGP (England)			CAD (England)		CRO (England)		SIL (England)		OUL (England)			Pts
Pos	Rider	Bike	R1	R2	R1	R2	R1	R2	R1	R2	R1	R2	R1	R2	R1	R2	R3	R1	R2	R3	R1	R2	R1	R2	R1	R2	R1	R2	R3	Pts
The Championship Showdown
1	(Japan) Ryuichi Kiyonari	Honda	2	Ret	9	4	Ret	4	1	DNS	1	1	2	C	2	Ret	1	3	2	2	3	3	11	4	5	2	1	1	1	649
2	(Australia) Josh Brookes	Honda	5	Ret	2	1	6	8	5	1	2	2	3	C	1	1	Ret	4	Ret	6	2	1	6	8	2	3	5	3	2	625
3	(England) Tommy Hill	Suzuki	1	2	1	2	2	3	Ret	2	Ret	8	8	C	3	2	2	15	6	4	1	2	1	2	8	5	2	Ret	5	620
4	(Northern Ireland) Michael Laverty	Suzuki	Ret	4	10	6	5	1	2	3	3	3	4	C	6	5	3	6	4	Ret	4	4	2	1	3	Ret	4	8	4	604
5	(England) Michael Rutter	Ducati	7	6	5	7	Ret	2	3	4	4	4	1	C	4	Ret	4	2	3	3	5	5	23	5	1	Ret	Ret	4	Ret	559
6	(Northern Ireland) Alastair Seeley	Suzuki	4	3	12	9	4	6	9	7	10	11	5	C	5	3	Ret	1	Ret	Ret	8	9	Ret	15	6	4	15	5	7	550
BSB Riders Cup
7	(England) James Ellison	Honda	3	1	DNS	DNS					13	12	24	C	7	4	Ret	7	5	5	6	6	Ret	6	4	1	3	7	3	210
8	(Northern Ireland) John Laverty	Kawasaki	10	7	7	8	3	5	6	5	8	6	6	C	12	10	5	9	Ret	9	Ret	12	8	13	Ret	9	9	6	8	190
9	(Scotland) Stuart Easton	Honda	6	5	4	3	1	Ret	Ret	10	5	Ret	19	C	Ret	8	Ret	Ret	7	8	10	11	3	3	17	Ret	7	2	Ret	189
10	(England) Chris Walker	Suzuki	9	Ret	Ret	15					6	5	10	C																130
10	(England) Chris Walker	Kawasaki					8	11	7	8																				130
10	(England) Chris Walker	Honda													11	7	7	22	Ret	13	11	15	9	12	9	8	16	Ret	9	130
11	(England) Tommy Bridewell	Honda	Ret	Ret	DNS	DNS	10	7	4	6	11	9	Ret	C	10	6	Ret	12	Ret	12	DSQ	8	Ret	7	Ret	12	6	DNS	DNS	105
12	(England) Gary Mason	Kawasaki	13	Ret	8	10	7	Ret	DNS	DNS	12	14	8	C	9	11	9	Ret	10	Ret	Ret	10	10	11	14	7	8	14	Ret	104
13	(England) Simon Andrews	Kawasaki	Ret	8							7	7	7	C	8	9	6	Ret	12	10	Ret	DNS	5	10	7	Ret	12	Ret	15	103
14	(England) Dan Linfoot	Yamaha	8	Ret	Ret	12	9	14	10	Ret	Ret	14	Ret	C	13	Ret	12	13	9	Ret	9	13	5	9	10	6	11	Ret	10	101
15	(Japan) Yukio Kagayama	Suzuki	12	Ret	3	11	Ret	DNS	Ret	DNS						21	10	8	8	7	7	7	16	14	13	14	13	13	11	92
16	(England) Tom Sykes	Kawasaki																5	1	1										61
17	(England) Martin Jessopp	Ducati	11	9	6	5	11	12	8	9	Ret	DNS															DNS	DNS	DNS	57
18	(England) Adam Jenkinson	Kawasaki	16	11	DNS	DNS	13	10	12	11	Ret	Ret	23	C	19	Ret	16	21	15	16	12	14	13	22	WD	WD	18	10	12	43
19	(England) Peter Hickman	Yamaha	15	Ret	11	13	12	17	13	13	Ret	15	Ret	C	15	Ret	11	19	13	14	Ret	16	12	16	20	10	14	Ret	Ret	43
20	(France) Loris Baz	Yamaha																					7	Ret	11	Ret	10	9	6	37
21	(Australia) Andrew Pitt	Yamaha									9	10	11	C	14	12	8	11	Ret	DNS										37
22	(England) Steve Brogan	BMW	14	10	16	14	15	15	14	14	14	Ret	22	C	16	13	13	Ret	14	Ret	13	17	17	19	22	Ret	20	11	16	34
23	(Northern Ireland) Ian Lowry	Yamaha					Ret	Ret	11	12																				25
23	(Northern Ireland) Ian Lowry	Kawasaki																10	11	11										25
24	(England) Gary Johnson	Suzuki	Ret	Ret	14	18	17	18			21	19	12	C	17	14	14	17	21	19	14	18	Ret	18	19	11	23	DNS	18	17
25	(South Africa) Hudson Kennaugh	Kawasaki	18	15	Ret	19	14	9	16	18	18	17	20	C																16
25	(South Africa) Hudson Kennaugh	Aprilia													22	16	15	20	16	Ret	Ret	Ret	15	17	16	15	19	15	14	16
26	(England) Tom Tunstall	Honda	Ret	17	Ret	16	Ret	DNS	15	17	15	20	15	C	18	15	Ret	23	20	15	15	19	14	21	15	17	17	12	13	16
27	(England) Chris Burns	Aprilia	19	16	19	25	DNS	DNS	17	Ret	Ret	22	17	C	DNS	DNS	DNS	14	19	Ret	16	20	20	24	12	Ret	Ret	DNS	DNS	6
28	(England) Christian Iddon	Honda	Ret	13	17	Ret	Ret	Ret	Ret	16	17	DNS	14	C																5
29	(England) Luke Jones	Yamaha	17	12	Ret	21	DNS	DNS					16	C	23	DNS	DNS													4
30	(Finland) Pauli Pekkanen	Suzuki	24	21	20	26	20	19	19	19	20	21	21	C	20	19	DSQ	24	18	17	17	21	21	23	18	13	24	16	20	3
31	(Australia) David Johnson	Suzuki	20	19	18	20	18	21										18	Ret	Ret	18	22	Ret	Ret	Ret	DNS				3
31	(Australia) David Johnson	Kawasaki							18	21	Ret	18	13	C	24	20	19													3
31	(England) Aaron Zanotti	Suzuki	25	22	21	23	19	13	21	20	Ret	23	18	C	21	18	17	16	17	18	20	23	19	25	DNS	18	21	20	DNS	3
32	(Australia) David Anthony	Suzuki	21	18	13	17	16	16	Ret	DNS																				3
34	(England) Steve Mercer	Yamaha	22	14																										2
35	(England) Alex Lowes	KTM						Ret	20	NC	15																			1
36	(England) Craig Fitzpatrick	Honda	23	20	15	Ret	Ret	22			22	Ret				17	18	25	Ret	Ret	19	24	WD	WD	Ret	16	WD	WD	WD	1
	(England) James Hillier	Kawasaki																					18	20	Ret	Ret	22	DNS	17	0
	(England) Peter Ward	Kawasaki	28	23	23	24	21	24	20	22	19	Ret	Ret	C	DNS	DNS	DNS	DNS	22	20										0
	(Republic of Ireland) Steve Heneghan	Honda	26	24	DNS	DNS			23	Ret	DNS	DNS				23	20	DNS	Ret	DNS	22	25			DNS	DNS	WD	WD	WD	0
	(England) Michael O'Brien	Yamaha			24	27	23	DNS	22	23						22	Ret	26	23	21	21	26			Ret	DNS				0
	(England) James Edmeades	KTM	DNS	DNS							Ret	Ret				Ret	DNS	DNS	DNS	DNS	Ret	Ret	22	26	21	Ret	27	Ret	DNS	0
	(England) Dave Wood	KTM			22	22																								0
	(England) Michael Howarth	Suzuki	27	Ret	Ret	Ret	22	23																						0
	(England) Karl Harris	Yamaha									Ret	Ret																		0
	(England) Leon Hunt	Kawasaki																							Ret	Ret	Ret	18	21	0
	(England) Howie Mainwaring	Kawasaki			Ret	DNS																								0
	(England) Joe Burns	Aprilia	DNS	DNS	DNS	DNS	DNS	DNS																						0
	(England) Neil Hodgson	Yamaha	DNS	DNS																										0
	(England) Guy Martin	Honda					DNS	DNS																						0
	(England) Matt Layt	Honda														WD	WD													0
Pos	Rider	Bike	BHI (England)		THR (England)		OUL (England)		CAD (England)		MAL (England)		KNO (Scotland)		SNE (England)			BHGP (England)			CAD (England)		CRO (England)		SIL (England)		OUL (England)			Pts

Colour	Result
Gold	Winner
Silver	Second place
Bronze	Third place
Green	Points classification
Blue	Non-points classification
Blue	Non-classified finish (NC)
Purple	Retired, not classified (Ret)
Red	Did not qualify (DNQ)
Red	Did not pre-qualify (DNPQ)
Black	Disqualified (DSQ)
White	Did not start (DNS)
White	Withdrew (WD)
White	Race cancelled (C)
Blank	Did not practice (DNP)
Blank	Did not arrive (DNA)
Blank	Excluded (EX)

=== Evolution Championship ===
Pos	Rider	Bike	BHI (England)		THR (England)		OUL (England)		CAD (England)		MAL (England)		KNO (Scotland)		SNE (England)			BHGP (England)			CAD (England)		CRO (England)		SIL (England)		OUL (England)			Pts
Pos	Rider	Bike	R1	R2	R1	R2	R1	R2	R1	R2	R1	R2	R1	R2	R1	R2	R3	R1	R2	R3	R1	R2	R1	R2	R1	R2	R1	R2	R3	Pts
1	(England) Steve Brogan	BMW	14	10			15	15	14	14	14	Ret	22	C	16	13	13	Ret	14	Ret	13	17	17	19	22	Ret	20	11	16	431
2	(South Africa) Hudson Kennaugh	Kawasaki	18	15	Ret	19	14	9	16	18	18	17	20	C																428
2	(South Africa) Hudson Kennaugh	Aprilia													22	16	15	20	16	Ret			15	17	16	15	19	15	14	428
3	(England) Gary Johnson	Suzuki	Ret	Ret	14	18	17	18			21	19	12	C	17	14	14	17	21	19	14	18	Ret	18	19	11	23	DNS	18	340
4	(Finland) Pauli Pekkanen	Suzuki	24	21	20	26	20	19	19	19	20	21	21	C	20	19	DSQ	24	18	17	17	21	21	23	18	13	24	16	20	306
5	(England) Aaron Zanotti	Suzuki	25	22	21	23	19	13	21	20	Ret	23	18	C	21	18	17	16	17	18	20	23	19	25	DNS	18	21	20	DNS	275
6	(Australia) David Johnson	Suzuki	20	19	18	20	18	21										18	Ret	Ret	18	22	Ret	Ret	Ret	DNS				200
6	(Australia) David Johnson	Kawasaki							18	21	Ret	18	13	C	24	20	19													200
7	(England) Chris Burns	Aprilia	19	16	19	25	DNS	DNS	17	Ret	Ret	22	17	C	DNS	DNS	DNS	14	19	Ret			20	24	12	Ret	Ret	DNS	DNS	178
8	(England) Craig Fitzpatrick	Honda	23	20	15	Ret	Ret	22			22	Ret				17	18	25	Ret	Ret	19	24	WD	WD						107
9	(Australia) David Anthony	Suzuki	21	18	13	17	16	16																						103
10	(England) Michael O'Brien	Yamaha			24	27	23	DNS	22	23						22	Ret	26	23	21	21	26			Ret	DNS				91
11	(England) Peter Ward	Kawasaki	28	23			21	24	20	22	19	Ret	Ret	C	DNS	DNS	DNS	DNS	22	20										82
12	(England) James Hillier	Kawasaki																					18	20	Ret	Ret	22	DNS	17	58
13	(England) James Edmeades	KTM	DNS	DNS							Ret	Ret				DNS	DNS	DNS	DNS	DNS	Ret	Ret	22	26	21	Ret	27	Ret	DNS	35
14	(Australia) Chris Seaton	Suzuki																									25	17	19	33
15	(England) Alex Lowes	KTM					Ret	20	Ret	15																				29
16	(Northern Ireland) Jamie Hamilton	Suzuki																									26	19	22	26
17	(England) Leon Hunt	Kawasaki																							Ret	Ret	Ret	18	21	20
18	(England) Michael Howarth	Suzuki	27	Ret	Ret	Ret	22	23																						19
19	(Republic of Ireland) Steve Heneghan	Honda	26	24	DNS	DNS																								13
	(England) Joe Burns	Aprilia	DNS	DNS	DNS	DNS	DNS	DNS																						0
Pos	Rider	Bike	BHI (England)		THR (England)		OUL (England)		CAD (England)		MAL (England)		KNO (Scotland)		SNE (England)			BHGP (England)			CAD (England)		CRO (England)		SIL (England)		OUL (England)			Pts

Colour	Result
Gold	Winner
Silver	Second place
Bronze	Third place
Green	Points classification
Blue	Non-points classification
Blue	Non-classified finish (NC)
Purple	Retired, not classified (Ret)
Red	Did not qualify (DNQ)
Red	Did not pre-qualify (DNPQ)
Black	Disqualified (DSQ)
White	Did not start (DNS)
White	Withdrew (WD)
White	Race cancelled (C)
Blank	Did not practice (DNP)
Blank	Did not arrive (DNA)
Blank	Excluded (EX)

=== Manufacturers Championship ===
Pos	Manufacturer	BHI (England)		THR (England)		OUL (England)		CAD (England)		MAL (England)		KNO (Scotland)		SNE (England)			BHGP (England)			CAD (England)		CRO (England)		SIL (England)		OUL (England)			Pts
Pos	Manufacturer	R1	R2	R1	R2	R1	R2	R1	R2	R1	R2	R1	R2	R1	R2	R3	R1	R2	R3	R1	R2	R1	R2	R1	R2	R1	R2	R3	Pts
1	Honda	2	1	2	1	1	4	1	1	1	1	2	C	1	1	1	3	2	2	2	1	3	3	2	1	1	1	1	576
2	Suzuki	1	2	1	2	2	1	2	2	3	3	4	C	3	2	2	1	4	4	1	2	1	1	3	4	2	5	4	495
3	Ducati	7	6	5	5	11	2	3	4	4	4	1	C	4	Ret	4	2	3	3	5	5	23	5	1	Ret	Ret	4	Ret	295
4	Kawasaki	13	7	7	8	3	5	6	5	7	6	6	C	8	9	5	5	1	1	13	10	5	10	7	7	8	6	8	265
5	Yamaha	8	12	11	12	9	14	10	12	9	10	11	C	13	12	8	11	9	14	12	10	5	9	10	6	10	9	6	153
6	BMW	14	10	16	14	15	15	14	14	14	Ret	22	C	16	13	13	Ret	14	Ret	14	17	17	19	22	Ret	20	11	16	33
7	Aprilia	19	16	19	25	DNS	DNS	17	Ret	Ret	22	17	C	22	16	15	14	16	Ret	16	20	15	17	12	15	19	15	14	11
8	KTM	DNS	DNS	22	22	Ret	20	NC	15	Ret	Ret				Ret	DNS	DNS	DNS	DNS	Ret	Ret	22	26	21	Ret	27	Ret	DNS	1
Pos	Manufacturer	BHI (England)		THR (England)		OUL (England)		CAD (England)		MAL (England)		KNO (Scotland)		SNE (England)			BHGP (England)			CAD (England)		CRO (England)		SIL (England)		OUL (England)			Pts
