= Ian Lowry =

Northern Irish motorcycle racer (born 1986)

Ian Christopher Lowry
- Nationality: Northern Irish
- Born: 22 September 1986 (age 40); Moira, County Down
- Website: ianlowry.co.uk/
Motorcycle racing career statistics
Superbike World Championship
Active years	2010
Manufacturers	Kawasaki
Championships	0
2010 championship position	21st
Starts / Wins / Podiums / Poles / F. laps / Points; 6 / 0 / 0 / 0 / 0 / 9

Ian Lowry (born September 22, 1986 in Northern Ireland) is a motorcyclist. He represents Northern Ireland.

== Biography ==
=== Moving to racing ===
A former chef, Lowry started off in the British Supersport class in 2006. He raced there for three seasons, finishing ninth in this first season, second in 2007, and third in the 2008 championship.

=== British Superbike Championship ===
Lowry then made the step to the British Superbike Championship in 2009 with the Relentless TAS Suzuki. He worked on his fitness in a university study pre-season. Lowry was a consistent points-scorer, racking up enough points for fifth overall despite failing to take a podium finish. He rounded off the season by competing in the Sunflower Trophy at Bishopscourt.

=== Spanish Moto 2, World and British Superbike Championships ===
TAS signed Michael Laverty and Alastair Seeley for 2010, leaving Lowry without a ride. He signed to race in the Spanish Moto2 championship, in a team ran by former Grand Prix winner Jeremy McWilliams, however the deal fell through. He also tested a BSB Motorpoint Yamaha in April 2010, as a potential short-term replacement for the injured Neil Hodgson. With Hodgson announcing his retirement on 22 April 2010, Lowry was confirmed as his replacement. However, two rounds later Lowry was replaced by Andrew Pitt. He made a BSB return for the Kawasaki SRT team in their one-off entry to the Brands Hatch bank holiday triple-header, and this continued into the Nurburgring World Superbike meeting, his debut in this class.

For 2011, Lowry signed for the Buildbase team who had moved from Kawasaki machinery to the new BMW S1000RR. The team struggled with the new bike, meaning that Lowry and team mate John Laverty struggled to score points, Lowry's best finish being a ninth in the second race at Snetterton. At the Cadwell park round, after Lowry's bike blew up in a free practice session he was so upset with the team's lack of form that he decided to go home missing the Cadwell Park weekend.

== Career statistics ==
Stats correct as of 9 July 2012

=== All time ===
Series	Years active	Races	Poles	Podiums	Wins	2nd place	3rd place	Fast Laps	Titles
British Supersport (BSS)	^{2006–2008}	34	0	15	3	5	7	0	0
British Superbike (BSB)	^{2009–}	66	0	1	1	0	0	0	0
World Supersport (WSS)	^{2010}	1	0	0	0	0	0	0	0
World Superbike (SBK)	^{2010–2011}	6	0	0	0	0	0	0	0
Total		107	0	16	4	5	7	0	0

=== By championship ===
==== British Supersport Championship ====
Year	Make	1	2	3	4	5	6	7	8	9	10	11	12	13	Pos	Pts	Ref
2006	Suzuki	BHI; 10	DON	THR; 16	OUL; 6	MON; C	MAL; 12	SNE; 15	KNO; 3	OUL; 5	CRO; 10	CAD; 11	SIL	BHGP; Ret	9th	59	
2007	Suzuki	BHGP; 3	THR	SIL; 2	OUL; 2	SNE; 1	MOP; 3	KNO; 5	OUL; 11	MAL; 2	CRO; 3	CAD	DON; 2	BHI; 6	2nd	179	
2008	Suzuki	THR; 5	OUL; 3	BHGP; 16	DON; 1	SNE; 5	MAL; 3	OUL; 3	KNO; 1	CAD; 8	CRO; Ret	SIL; 6	BHI; 8		3rd	146	

==== British Superbike Championship ====
Year	Make	1		2		3			4		5		6			7		8			9			10		11		12			Pos	Pts	Ref
Year	Make	R1	R2	R1	R2	R1	R2	R3	R1	R2	R1	R2	R1	R2	R3	R1	R2	R1	R2	R3	R1	R2	R3	R1	R2	R1	R2	R1	R2	R3	Pos	Pts	Ref
2009	Suzuki	BHI; 13	BHI; 19	OUL; 7	OUL; 6	DON; 8	DON; 6		THR; 19	THR; 8	SNE; 5	SNE; 7	KNO; 6	KNO; Ret		MAL; 8	MAL; 20	BHGP; 12	BHGP; 12	BHGP; 9	CAD; 4	CAD; Ret		CRO; 5	CRO; 7	SIL; 8	SIL; 9	OUL; 8	OUL; Ret	OUL; 4	5th	170	
2010	Yamaha	BHI	BHI	THR	THR	OUL; Ret	OUL; Ret		CAD; 11	CAD; 12	MAL	MAL	KNO	KNO		SNE	SNE														21st	25	
2010	Kawasaki																	BHGP; 10	BHGP; 11	BHGP; 11	CAD	CAD		CRO	CRO	SIL	SIL	OUL	OUL	OUL	21st	25	
2011	BMW	BHI; Ret	BHI; Ret	OUL; 18	OUL; 18	CRO; 18	CRO; 14		THR; 16	THR; 22	KNO; DNS	KNO; DNS	SNE; 19	SNE; 9		OUL; Ret	OUL; C	BHGP; 11	BHGP; Ret	BHGP; Ret	CAD; WD	CAD; WD	CAD; WD								22nd	27	
2011	Kawasaki																							DON; 12	DON; Ret	SIL; 11	SIL; 15	BHGP; 13	BHGP; Ret	BHGP; Ret	22nd	27	
2012	Honda	BHI; 4	BHI; C	THR; 1	THR; 5	OUL; Ret	OUL; 21	OUL; 13	SNE; 8	SNE; 4	KNO; Ret	KNO; 10	OUL; Ret	OUL; 6	OUL; 7	BHGP	BHGP	CAD	CAD		DON	DON		ASS	ASS	SIL	SIL	BHGP	BHGP	BHGP	7th*	98*	

- * Season still in progress

==== World Supersport Championship ====
Year	Make	1	2	3	4	5	6	7	8	9	10	11	12	13	Pos	Pts	Ref
2010	Yamaha	AUS	POR	SPA	NED	ITA	RSA	USA	SMR	CZE	GBR; 20	GER	ITA	FRA	NC	0	

==== World Superbike Championship ====
Year	Make	1		2		3		4		5		6		7		8		9		10		11		12		13		Pos	Pts	Ref
Year	Make	R1	R2	R1	R2	R1	R2	R1	R2	R1	R2	R1	R2	R1	R2	R1	R2	R1	R2	R1	R2	R1	R2	R1	R2	R1	R2	Pos	Pts	Ref
2010	Yamaha	AUS	AUS	POR	POR	SPA	SPA	NED	NED	ITA	ITA	RSA	RSA	USA	USA	SMR	SMR	CZE	CZE	GBR	GBR	GER; 12	GER; Ret	ITA; 17	ITA; 16	FRA; 14	FRA; 13	21st	9	
