= Christian Iddon =

British motorcycle racer

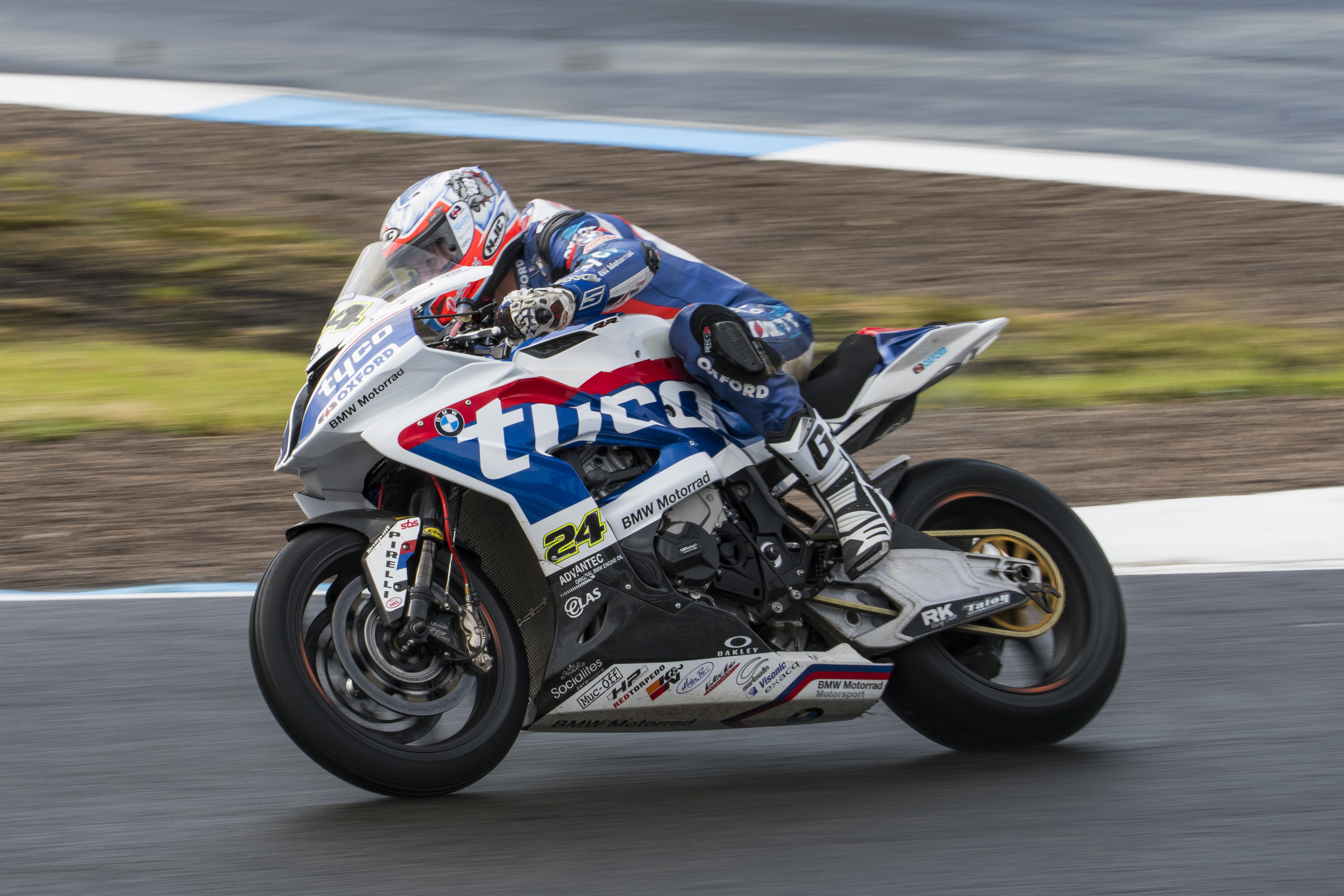
- Iddon in 2016
- Nationality: British
- Born: 7 January 1985 (age 41); Stockport, England
- Current team: AJN Steelstock Kawasaki
- Bike number: 21
Motorcycle racing career statistics
Superbike World Championship
Active years	2014
Manufacturers	Bimota
Starts / Wins / Podiums / Poles / F. laps / Points; 16 / 0 / 0 / 0 / 0 / 0
Supersport World Championship
Active years	2010, 2013
Manufacturers	Honda, MV Agusta
Starts / Wins / Podiums / Poles / F. laps / Points; 13 / 0 / 1 / 0 / 0 / 49

Christian Iddon (born 7 January 1985) is a British motorcycle racer from Stockport, England. He is the son of former racer Paul Iddon.

== Career summary ==
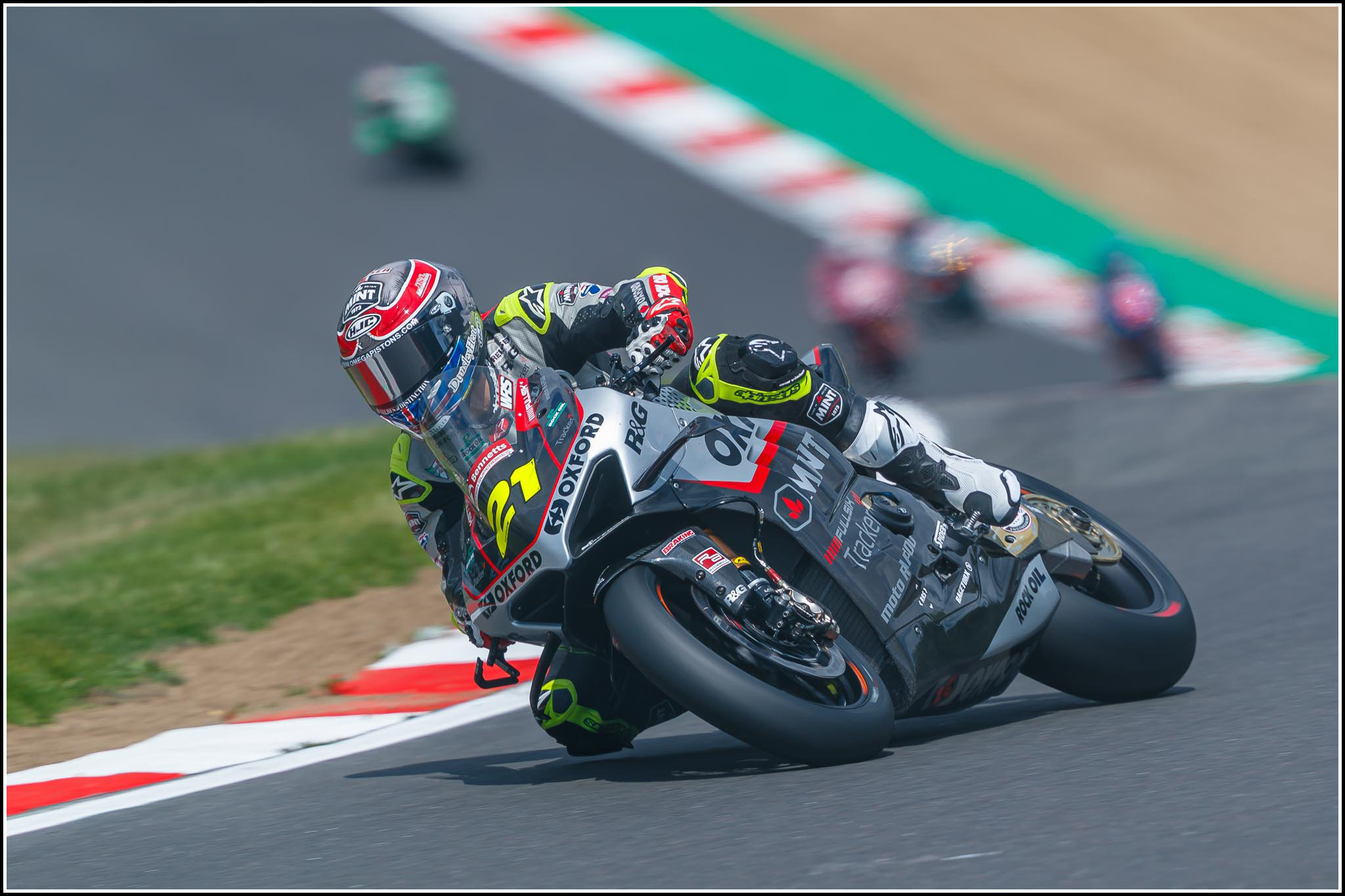
Iddon riding for Oxford Products Racing Ducati in 2023

A regular in British Superbikes, Iddon has competed at a high level, winning races and championships in some of the biggest motorcycle racing championships across the world. He has raced in Supermoto, Supersport, Hillclimb and Superbike. A typically adaptable rider, Iddon has won a large amount of off-road titles including multiple British and International Supermoto championships, that rank in the double figures. Since switching to circuit racing in 2010, Iddon has ranked highly among some of the world's best modified production superbike racers, scoring podiums and finishing several seasons in the top ten of the British Superbike Championship.

=== 2010-2013 Seasons: Beginn of the Race Circuit Career in BSB and in the British Supersport and World Supersport Championships ===
Following a transition from Supermoto after 9 Championship titles after the 2009 season and a short unsuccessful half season in 2010 with SMT Racing's Honda CBR1000RR in the BSB and an uneventful wildcard etry in the British Supersport later in the year, Christian Iddon established a reputation as a capable development rider through stints in the British Supersport Championship with Oxford Dealers TAG Racing Triumph in 2011 finishing in sixth overall and 2012 where he finished fourth in the standings and the World Supersport Championship with the ParkinGO MV Agusta Corse squad in 2013. His technical feedback and adaptability during these developmental campaigns on the Triumph Daytona 675 and MV Agusta F3 675 paved the way for subsequent progression into the World Superbike class, where he was involved in the development of the Bimota BB3 with Team Alstare in 2014.

=== 2014 Season: The Bimota Homologation Controversy in the Superbike World Championship ===
For the 2014 season, Iddon signed with the historic Alstare squad to campaign the newly developed, BMW S 1000 RR-powered Bimota BB3 in the EVO class of the Superbike World Championship (WorldSBK). Despite significant technical difficulties reconciling the spec control electronics with the chassis—most notably faulty lean angle sensors that triggered erratic ride-by-wire throttle behavior—the bike proved highly competitive due to its engine performance. Iddon consistently ran in the points, securing a season-best ninth-place finish at Laguna Seca.

However, low-volume manufacturer Bimota failed to meet the minimum production quota required by the Fédération Internationale de Motocyclisme (FIM) for commercial homologation (producing only around 30 units instead of the lowered 125-unit target). As a result, the team was officially disqualified in August 2014 after eight rounds. All of Iddon's accumulated championship points and race results were retroactively deleted from the official classifications, replaced with "EXL" (excluded) markers. Being forced off the grid before the flyaway final rounds left him out of sight of team managers, ultimately dissolving his prospects for a replacement WorldSBK seat the following year.

=== Return to the domestic British Superbike Championship ===
Despite the setbacks in the WSBK, during a later wildcard appearance at the rainy Assen round of the 2014 British Superbike Championship, Iddon mastered the changeable track conditions to claim a historic maiden pole position for both himself and the Alstare Bimota Junior Team, showing the promise of the developed racing package. He finished the first race in fifth and retired on the second race.

Following the premature collapse of the WorldSBK project, Iddon returned to domestic racing full-time, establishing himself as a perennial frontrunner in the British Superbike Championship (BSB):

=== 2015 Season: First Full-time BSB campaign with the Suzuki of Halsall ===
In 2015 he joined Bennetts Suzuki from Halsall Racing to complete his first full season in the British premier class. He finished the season in 10th overall.

=== 2016-2019 Seasons: The TAS Racing years ===
From 2016–2019 Iddon Signed with the factory-supported Tyco BMW from TAS Racing, where he became a regular podium finisher. In 2017, Iddon finished a career high up until this point seventh overall in British Superbikes and in addition won the 2017 Rider's Cup trophy, given to the top non-showdown rider. In 2019, Iddon completed his fourth BSB season with Tyco BMW, alongside teammate Keith Farmer who stepped up from Superstock.

=== 2020 & 2021 Seasons: PBM Ducati Title Contentions ===
In November 2019, Iddon was announced as the replacement to the outgoing 2019 title-winner Scott Redding at the Be Wiser Ducati team. Within the pandemic affected 2020–2021 Christian transferred to Paul Bird Motorsport using the PBM Ducati, marking the most successful stint of his career, given the best package on the grid. He captured his maiden BSB race victory and qualified for the Title Showdown in consecutive seasons. In 2020, Iddon was a frontrunner in the British Superbike Championship, riding for PBM's VisionTrack Ducati. He finished third in the 2020 BSB championship, following a victory at Snetterton and a total of eight podiums across the 18 races, and fourth in the 2021 season.

=== 2022 Season: Hawk Suzuki woes ===
After two seasons with Paul Bird Ducati, Iddon was contracted to Buildbase Suzuki from Hawk Racing for 2022, racing in the 2022 British Superbike Championship. The season went rather mixed with an overall 15th position finish and various missed rounds, which lead both Iddon's exit after the season and Hawk ditching the Suzuki for Honda for the following seasons.

=== 2023 Season: Return to Podiums with Moto Rapido Ducati ===
For 2023 he hoved to Moto Rapido Racing to pilot the Oxford Products Ducati , finishing ninth overall in the championship standings after capturing a handful of podium finishes and showing high consistency by scoring points in 28 of the 33 races. In November 2023, following paddock rumors of a potential switch, it was officially announced that Iddon had signed a one-year contract extension to continue piloting the team's Ducati Panigale V4R for the 2024 championship campaign alongside reigning British Supersport Champion Ben Currie.

Iddon remained with the Oxford Products Racing Ducati squad for the 2024 season, and increasing podium performances were followed by a subsequent race win at Knockhill. Iddon finished both years within the top 10 overall with a ninth in 2023 and a sixth in 2024.

=== 2024 Season: Title Threat and Injury Setback ===
Iddon mounted a strong campaign during the 2024 British Superbike Championship, positioning himself as a genuine title contender heading into the late stages of the season. However, his championship aspirations were cut short during race three at the penultimate round at Donington Park, where he was involved in a serious collision with Kawasaki rider Jason O'Halloran. The crash resulted in substantial damage to his foot, requiring comprehensive surgical reconstruction and forcing him to withdraw from the final round of the season at Brands Hatch while sitting sixth in the standings.

=== 2025 Season: Move to Kawasaki with FS-3 Racing ===
In spite of the improved form Christian Iddon wasn't retained following uncertainty on the late season injury he sustained to his foot and was once again on the market.

On 2 December 2024, during a live rider unveiling at the Motorcycle Live show, it was officially announced that Iddon would join the FS-3 Racing squad—competing under the newly announced AJN Steelstock Kawasaki banner for the 2025 British Superbike Championship season. Partnering with youngster Max Cook, the move marked a major transition for Iddon, switching to the Kawasaki Ninja ZX-10RR Superbike after spending four of the previous five seasons piloting machinery from other manufacturersHe finished the season in 8th overall as the best Kawasaki rider.

=== 2026 Season: Switch to Yamaha with Swan Racing ===
On 5 November 2025, it was officially announced that Iddon had signed with the Sencat by Swan Racing team to contest the 2026 British Superbike Championship campaign. The move saw Iddon transition onto Yamaha YZF-R1 machinery, linking up with the former IN Competition squad which merged with the Sencat operation under the Swan Racing outfit since 2024 to contest another championship on yet another new manufacturer for him.

== Career statistics ==
=== British Superbike Championship ===
==== By year ====
(key) (Races in bold indicate pole position; races in italics indicate fastest lap)

Year	Make	1			2			3			4			5			6			7			8			9			10			11			12			Pos	Pts
Year	Make	R1	R2	R3	R1	R2	R3	R1	R2	R3	R1	R2	R3	R1	R2	R3	R1	R2	R3	R1	R2	R3	R1	R2	R3	R1	R2	R3	R1	R2	R3	R1	R2	R3	R1	R2	R3	Pos	Pts
2010	Honda	BHI; Ret	BHI; 13		THR; 17	THR; Ret		OUL; Ret	OUL; Ret		CAD; Ret	CAD; 16		MAL; 17	MAL; DNS		KNO; 14	KNO; C		SNE	SNE	SNE	BHGP	BHGP	BHGP	CAD	CAD		CRO	CRO		SIL	SIL		OUL	OUL	OUL	28th	5

Year	Make	1			2			3			4			5			6			7			8			9			10			11			12			Pos	Pts
Year	Make	R1	R2	R3	R1	R2	R3	R1	R2	R3	R1	R2	R3	R1	R2	R3	R1	R2	R3	R1	R2	R3	R1	R2	R3	R1	R2	R3	R1	R2	R3	R1	R2	R3	R1	R2	R3	Pos	Pts
2014	Bimota	BHI	BHI		OUL	OUL		SNE	SNE		KNO	KNO		BHGP	BHGP		THR	THR		OUL	OUL	OUL	CAD	CAD		DON	DON		**ASS**; 5	ASS; Ret		SIL	SIL		BHGP	BHGP	BHGP	29th	11

Year	Make	1		2		3			4		5		6			7		8			9			10		11		12			Pos	Pts
Year	Make	R1	R2	R1	R2	R1	R2	R3	R1	R2	R1	R2	R1	R2	R3	R1	R2	R1	R2	R3	R1	R2	R3	R1	R2	R1	R2	R1	R2	R3	Pos	Pts
2015	Suzuki	DON; 7	DON; 5	BHI; Ret	BHI; 12	OUL; 17	OUL; 15		SNE; 16	SNE; 9	KNO; Ret	KNO; 10	BHGP; 13	BHGP; 8		THR; Ret	THR; 20	CAD; 9	CAD; 13		OUL; Ret	OUL; 9	OUL; 8	ASS; 7	ASS; 6	SIL; 8	SIL; 4	BHGP; 4	BHGP; 8	BHGP; 5	10th	145
2016	BMW	SIL; 3	SIL; 3	OUL; 2	OUL; 2	BHI; 11	BHI; 7		KNO; 14	KNO; 10	SNE; 19	SNE; 6	THR; 21	THR; 13		BHGP; 9	BHGP; 10	CAD; Ret	CAD; Ret		OUL; Ret	OUL; 11	OUL; 9	DON; 8	DON; 3	ASS; 12	ASS; 8	BHGP; 2	**BHGP**; Ret	BHGP; 5	9th	199
2017	BMW	DON; 3	DON; 4	BHI; 3	BHI; 2	OUL; 8	OUL; 4		KNO; DNS	KNO; DNS	SNE	SNE	BHGP; 8	BHGP; 3		THR; 5	THR; 4	CAD; 8	CAD; 5		SIL; 6	SIL; 7	SIL; Ret	OUL; Ret	OUL; 9	ASS; Ret	ASS; 8	BHGP; 2	BHGP; 2	BHGP; 5	7th	238
2018	BMW	DON; 14	DON; 6	BHI; 5	BHI; 6	OUL; DNS	OUL; DNS		SNE; 9	SNE; 8	KNO; 7	KNO; 6	BHGP; 5	BHGP; 6		THR; 13	THR; Ret	CAD; 6	CAD; 6		SIL; 15	SIL; 5	SIL; 10	OUL; DNS	OUL; DNS	ASS; 8	ASS; 10	BHGP; Ret	BHGP; 5	BHGP; 4	9th	167

Year	Bike	1		2		3			4		5		6		7		8		9			10		11		12			Pos	Pts
Year	Bike	R1	R2	R1	R2	R1	R2	R3	R1	R2	R1	R2	R1	R2	R1	R2	R1	R2	R1	R2	R3	R1	R2	R1	R2	R1	R2	R3	Pos	Pts
2019	BMW	SIL; 11	SIL; 17	OUL; Ret	OUL; 6	DON; 7	DON; 6	DON; 6	BRH; 7	BRH; 6	KNO; 4	KNO; Ret	SNE; 10	SNE; 6	THR; 17	THR; 6	CAD; 6	CAD; 4	OUL; 5	OUL; 7	OUL; Ret	ASS; Ret	ASS; Ret	DON; 6	DON; 5	BHGP; 4	BHGP; 5	BHGP; 4	7th	203

Year	Bike	1			2			3			4			5			6			7			8			9			10			11			Pos	Pts
Year	Bike	R1	R2	R3	R1	R2	R3	R1	R2	R3	R1	R2	R3	R1	R2	R3	R1	R2	R3	R1	R2	R3	R1	R2	R3	R1	R2	R3	R1	R2	R3	R1	R2	R3	Pos	Pts
2020	Ducati	DON; 4	DON; 8	DON; 4	SNE; 1	SNE; 5	**SNE**; 3	SIL; 8	SIL; 13	SIL; 7	OUL; 2	OUL; 2	OUL; 2	DON; 2	DON; 6	DON; 4	BHGP; 2	BHGP; 3	BHGP; 4																3rd	258
2021	Ducati	OUL; 2	OUL; 2	OUL; 2	KNO; 1	KNO; 4	KNO; 4	BHGP; 3	BHGP; 5	BHGP; 1	THR; 2	THR; Ret	THR; 9	DON; 4	DON; Ret	DON; Ret	CAD; 5	CAD; Ret	CAD; 7	SNE; Ret	SNE; 11	SNE; 5	SIL; 2	SIL; 7	SIL; 6	OUL; 3	OUL; 4	OUL; 11	DON; 3	DON; 3	DON; 2	BHGP; 3	BHGP; 4	BHGP; Ret	4th	1141
2022	Suzuki	SIL; 8	SIL; 10	SIL; 11	OUL; 7	OUL; 7	OUL; 14	DON; 6	DON; 7	DON; 6	KNO; Ret	KNO; DNS	KNO; DNS	BRH; 10	BRH; Ret	BRH; 11	THR; 12	THR; 11	THR; 11	CAD; 18	CAD; 12	CAD; Ret	SNE; 4	SNE; Ret	SNE; Ret	OUL; 7	OUL; DNS	OUL; DNS	DON	DON	DON	BRH; Ret	BRH; 7	BRH; 9	15th	135
2023	Ducati	SIL; 25	SIL; Ret	SIL; 11	OUL; 8	OUL; 7	OUL; 7	DON; Ret	DON; 9	DON; 5	KNO; 5	KNO; 5	**KNO**; 9	SNE; 5	SNE; 8	SNE; 5	BRH; 3	**BRH**; 2	BRH; 4	THR; 13	THR; 9	THR; 10	CAD; 7	CAD; 7	CAD; 7	OUL; 7	OUL; 7	OUL; 7	DON; 16	DON; 3	DON; 2	BRH; 5	BRH; Ret	BRH; 6	9th	306
2024	Ducati	NAV; 6	NAV; 5		OUL; 2	OUL; 3	**OUL**; 2	DON; Ret	**DON**; 6	DON; 9	KNO; Ret	KNO; 2	KNO; 1	SNE; 6	SNE; 3	SNE; 3	BRH; 5	BRH; 6	BRH; 2	THR; 9	THR; 6	THR; 13	CAD; 13	CAD; 9	CAD; 8	OUL; Ret	OUL; Ret	OUL; 6	DON; 10	DON; 8	DON; Ret	BRH	BRH	BRH	6th	261
2025	Kawasaki	OUL; Ret	OUL; 8	OUL; C	DON; 7	DON; Ret	DON; 9	SNE; 5	SNE; 6	SNE; 1	KNO; Ret	KNO; 9	KNO; 4	BRH; 4	BRH; 4	BRH; 5	THR	THR	THR	CAD	CAD	CAD	DON	DON	DON	ASS	ASS	ASS	OUL	OUL	OUL	BRH	BRH	BRH	8th*	104*

^{*} Season still in progress.

=== British Supersport Championship ===
(key) (Races in bold indicate pole position; races in italics indicate fastest lap)

Year	Bike	1	2	3	4	5	6	7	8	9	10	11	12	Pos	Pts
2010	Honda	BHI	THR	OUL	CAD	MAL	KNO	SNE	BHGP	CAD	CRO	SIL; Ret	OUL; 13	32nd	3

Year	Bike	1		2		3		4		5		6		7		8		9		10		11		12			Pos	Pts
Year	Bike	R1	R2	R1	R2	R1	R2	R1	R2	R1	R2	R1	R2	R1	R2	R1	R2	R1	R2	R1	R2	R1	R2	R1	R2	R3	Pos	Pts
2012	Triumph	BHI; 4	BHI; 4	THR; 6	THR; 10	OUL; 6	OUL; 5	SNE; 7	SNE; 5	KNO; 7	**KNO**; 19	OUL; Ret	OUL; Ret	BHGP; 3	BHGP; 4	CAD; 2	CAD; 2	DON; 3	DON; 3	ASS; 1	ASS; 2	SIL; 1	SIL; 3	BHGP; 4	BHGP; Ret		4th	285.5
