= Josh Brookes =

Australian motorcycle racer (born 1983)

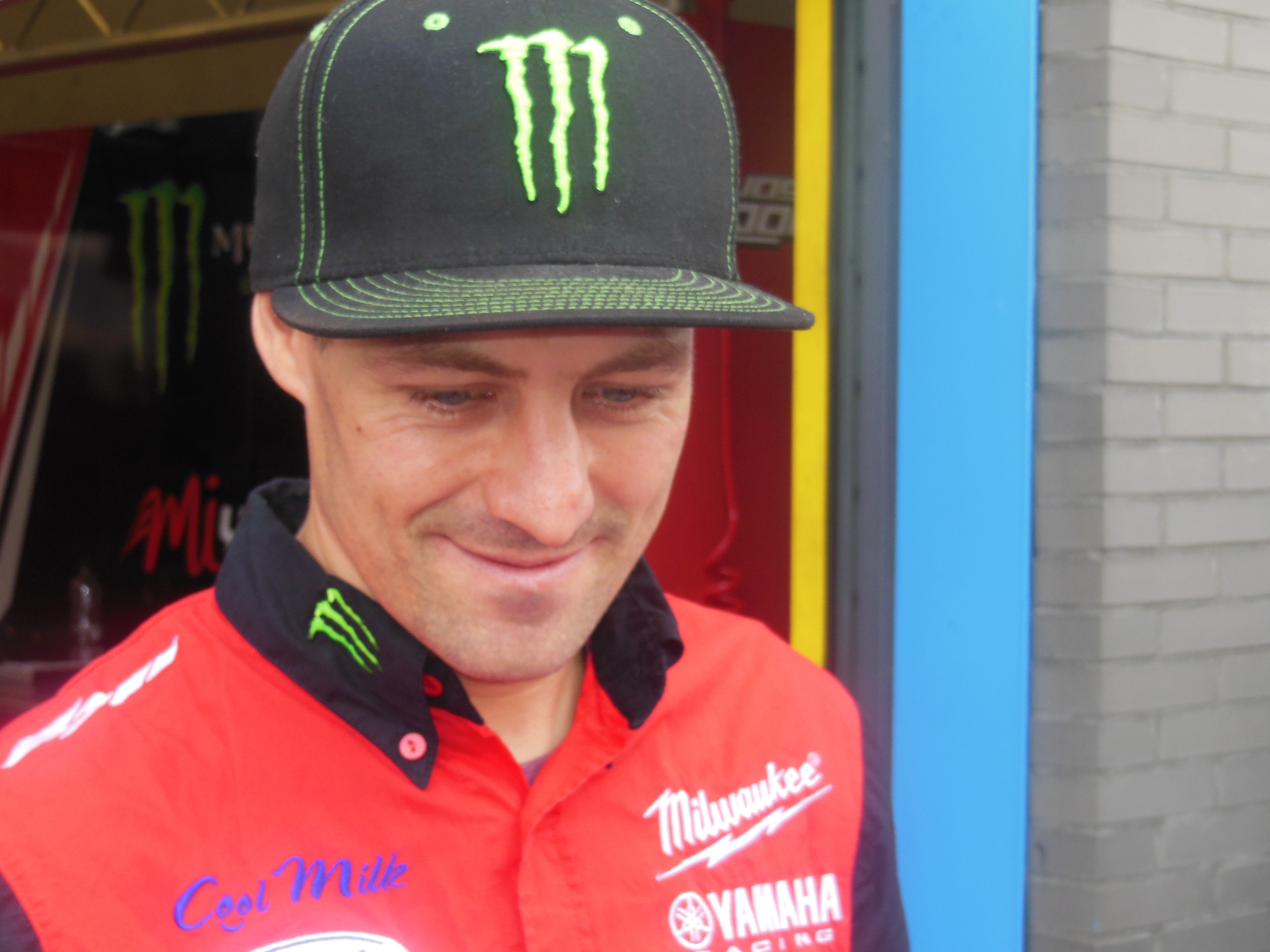
- Brookes in 2014
- Nationality: Australian
- Born: 28 April 1983 (age 43); Sydney, New South Wales, Australia
- Current team: DAO Racing Honda
- Bike number: 25
Motorcycle racing career statistics
Superbike World Championship
Active years	2006–2007, 2010, 2012, 2016–2017
Manufacturers	Kawasaki, Honda, Suzuki, BMW, Yamaha
Championships	0
2017 championship position	25th (4 pts)
Starts / Wins / Podiums / Poles / F. laps / Points; 61 / 0 / 0 / 0 / 0 / 143
Supersport World Championship
Active years	2004, 2006–2008
Manufacturers	Honda, Ducati
Championships	0
2013 championship position	3rd (162 pts)
Starts / Wins / Podiums / Poles / F. laps / Points; 22 / 2 / 7 / 0 / 1 / 228
British Superbike Championship
Active years	2009–2015, 2017–
Manufacturers	Honda, Suzuki, Yamaha, BMW
Championships	2 (2015, 2020)
2026 championship position	15th (134 points)
Starts / Wins / Podiums / Poles / F. laps / Points; 463 / 57 / 157 / 53 / 48 / 7526
Isle of Man TT career
TTs contested	5 (2013–14, 2017–18, 2023–present)
TT wins	1
First TT win	Senior Classic TT 2017
Last TT win	Senior Classic TT 2017
TT podiums	3

Joshua Andrew Brookes (born 28 April 1983) is an Australian professional motorcycle racer in the British Superbike Championship. He is one of the most successful riders on the British Superbike grid, having won 57 races, with 157 podiums, and two championships, in 2015 and 2020, over his career. In 2015, he won 13 of the last 16 races, to edge out Shane Byrne to the title. Brookes has finished runner-up in the championship a further four times. His nickname is 'Bad Boy Brookes'.

Brookes first raced in the British Superbike Championship in 2009, having started competing in his native Australia, winning domestic titles before moving onto the world stage in both the Superbike and Supersport classes. Brookes had his first appearance in British Championship action in 2008, competing for Honda Racing in the Supersport class at the final round of the season, before joining the Honda team in the Superbike class the following year. For his 2015 title, he was riding a Yamaha YZF-R1, and in 2020 he won aboard a Ducati Panigale. He finished sixth in the 2021 championship, but remained with the team for 2022 as well, now renamed as MCE Ducati. For 2023, Brookes joined FHO Racing aboard a BMW M1000RR.

== Career ==
=== Early career ===
In 2004, Brookes won the World Supersport round at Philip Island as a wild card, before a serious crash ruined his year. He returned to win Australia's Superbike and Supersport titles in 2005 on a Honda.

=== Supersport & Superbike World Championship ===
Brookes then moved to World Supersport with a Caracchi Ducati for 2006, but left the team mid-season despite a sixth place at his home round. Brookes was soon racing again however, joining Bertocchi Kawasaki in the Superbike World Championship, debuting on the bike at the Italian round at Mugello. He ran fourth in a wet race in the Netherlands before falling, but generally struggled, as it was his first time living in Europe, mostly on circuits he did not know.

Brookes did enough to be retained for 2007, with the team gaining new investors, a switch to Honda Fireblade bikes, and a new teammate in fellow Australian Karl Muggeridge. Despite nine points finishes in the first seven two-race rounds, the team missed round 8 after a legal challenge from Sergio Bertocchi.

Brookes joined the Stiggy Motorsport Honda team in the Supersport World Championship for the final five rounds. He continued with them in 2008. Brookes scored his second win (and Stiggy's first) at Donington Park, moving up to second in the championship. He also made a one-off appearance in the British Supersport Championship for HM Plant Honda, qualifying on pole and finishing third.

=== British Superbike Championship ===
For 2009, Brookes switches to British Superbikes with HM Plant Honda, alongside fellow Aussie Glen Richards, however he was forced to miss the opening round due to visa issues. Round 3 at Donington Park was also a disaster, as Brookes collided with Sylvain Guintoli on the sighting lap on the way to the grid, causing a broken leg for the Frenchman. Brookes claimed to have experienced a brake failure, if proven these allegations would have left Honda liable: for this reason they neglected to give their support. He received a one-race suspended ban as a result. In the next meeting at Thruxton, he took seventh and third, with some fighting overtaking moves in race two especially. He followed this with a front row start and two third places at Snetterton.

Brookes was involved in further controversy at Mallory Park. While running fourth he lost control of the bike, resulting in a crash with the leader Simon Andrews. The Honda's engine case broke, spilling oil on the track and causing five other riders to crash. All riders involved in the accident were omitted from the result, even those who deliberately downed the bikes to avoid further carnage, due to red flag regulations. Brookes apologised in a TV interview later in the programme for his mistake. He had sustained a broken thumb from the crash. The BSB officials awarded him a two-race ban following the incident, for "not riding in a manner compatible with general safety". He finished third on his return at Croft, defending from one-off teammate Ryuichi Kiyonari on the line.

Despite the bad blood felt towards Brookes, GSE Airwaves Yamaha boss, Colin Wright told a Eurosport TV interview at Brands Hatch that he would like to sign Brookes for 2010, if he were to lose one or both 2009 riders. As it turned out, GSE Yamaha would not return in 2010.

For 2010 Brookes, stayed with the HM Plant Honda team, Brookes has changed to bike #4 and is also joined by former double British Superbike Champion Ryuichi Kiyonari. He took his first win in the fourth race of the season. He also took a win at Cadwell Park and two wins at Snetterton. His season was closely documented in the film I, Superbiker.

Brookes also made a British Superstock entry in the MotoGP support round at Silverstone, and a World Superbike appearance substituting for injured countryman Broc Parkes at Phillip Island. Brookes will also make a wildcard entry with teammate Kiyonari at Silverstone.

For 2011, Brookes switched to the Relentless TAS Suzuki team joined by Alastair Seeley who is competing in British Supersport. He made a poor start to the season with a massive crash at Oulton Park which wrecked his bike. By mid-season, he started to get good results.

During 2015, Brookes raced a Milwaukee Yamaha YZF-R1, winning the British Superbike Championship at the final round of the season at Brands Hatch. In the last race of the event, Brookes hit the inside kerb of a bend and slid off, but had already amassed sufficient points to win the Championship in the first of three races at the venue, so he re-joined the track for a lap after the race to wave to spectators.

In 2017, Brookes finished second in the championship standings aboard a Yamaha. He won two races and scored four second places.

For the 2018 season, Brookes was signed to the McAMS Yamaha team.

For the 2019-2022 seasons, Brookes was signed to the Be Wiser Ducati Team.

For the 2023-2024 seasons, Brookes was signed to the FHO Racing BMW team.

In April 2025, Brookes joined Isle of Man based DAO Racing riding the Honda CBR1000R-R Fireblade alongside Lee Jackson, with both confirmed to ride for the team again in 2026.

=== Isle of Man TT ===
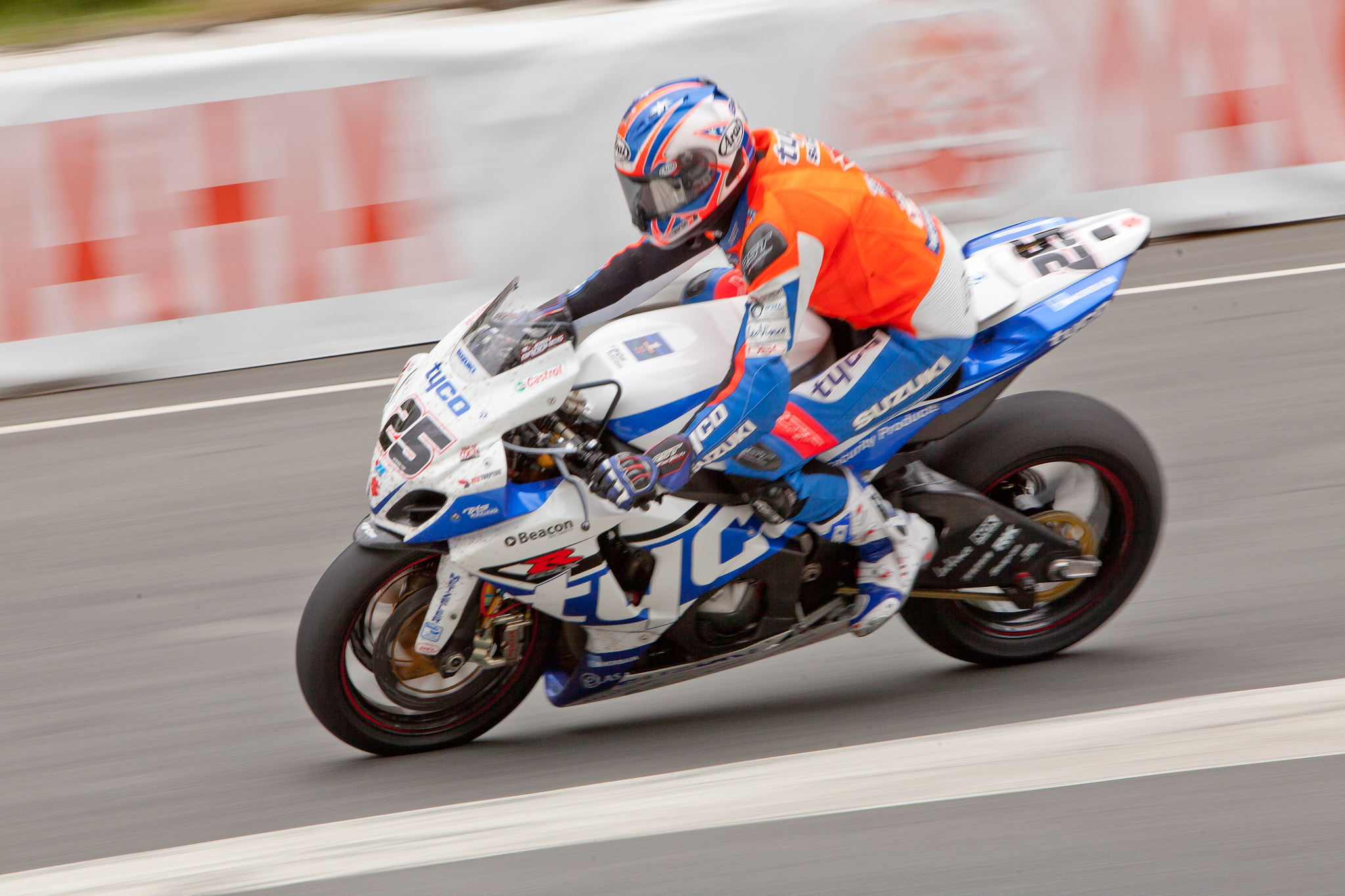
Brookes on the Tyco Suzuki 1000 cc entering Governor's Bridge during the 2013 TT Superbike race

On 28 November 2012, it was announced that Brookes would compete at the 2013 Isle of Man TT Races. As a high-profile 'newcomer' similar to Steve Plater, Brookes would compete for Tyco Suzuki in the Superbike, Superstock and Senior categories.

In the 2013 Superbike race, Brookes became the fastest-ever newcomer, with a lap of 127.726 mph (which stood until the 129 mph lap of Peter Hickman in 2014) and finished in tenth position. From his two other entries, he finished in 46th place and a DNF (did not finish).

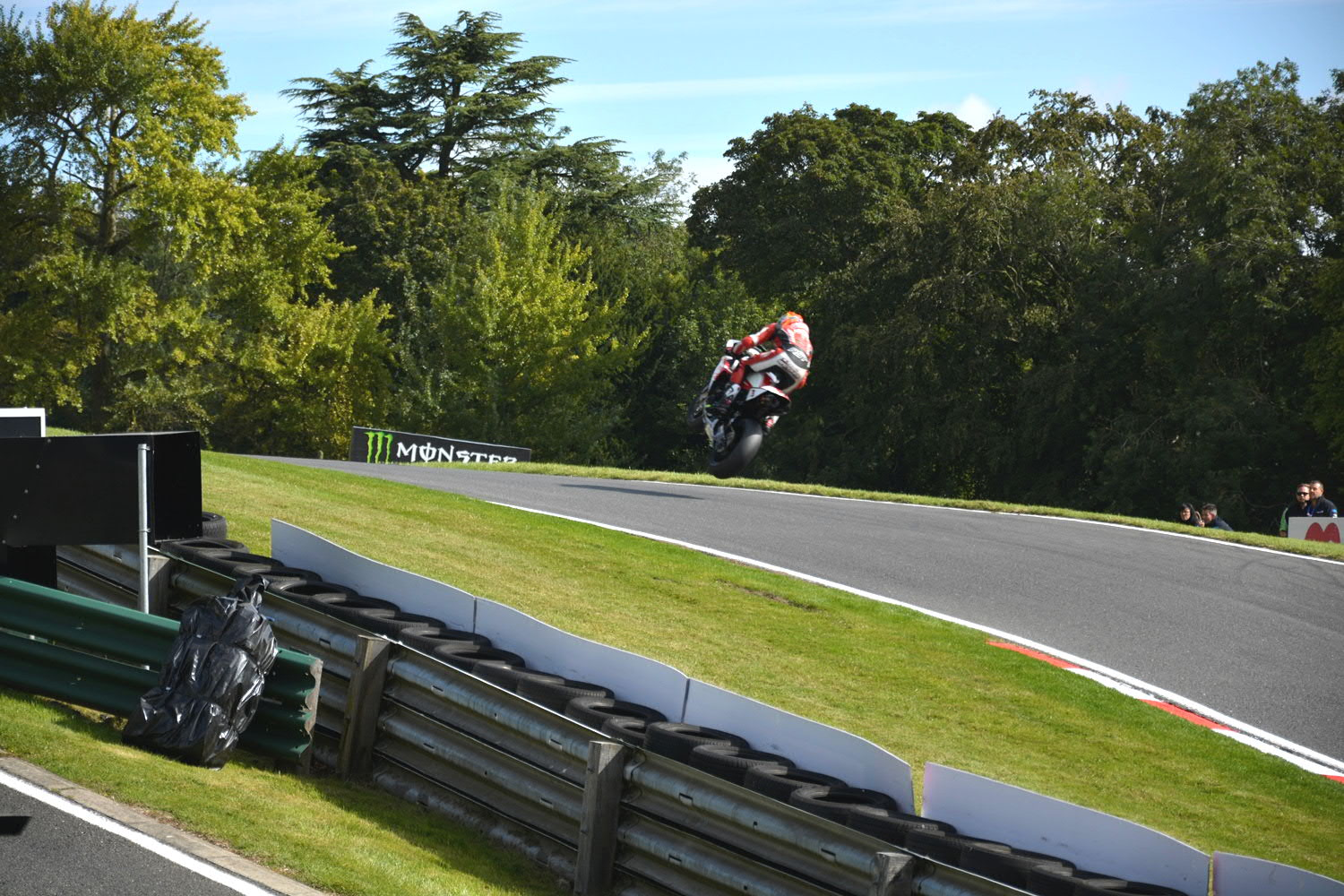
Brookes aviating at The Mountain, Cadwell Park in 2014

Brookes had better results at the 2014 TT, with a seventh, tenth, 67th and DNF from his four classes entered.

== Career statistics ==
=== All-time statistics ===
Series	Years	Races	Poles	Podiums	**Wins**	**2nd place**	**3rd place**	Fastest laps	Titles
Supersport World Championship	^{2004–2008}	22	0	7	2	3	2	1	0
Superbike World Championship	^{2006–2007, 2010, 2012, 2016–2017}	61	0	0	0	0	0	0	0
British Superbike Championship	^{2009−2015, 2017–}	144	21	76	20	30	26	25	1
National Superstock 1000	^{2010}	2	0	2	2	0	0	1	0
Total		229	21	85	24	33	28	27	1

=== Supersport World Championship ===
==== Races by year ====
(key) (Races in bold indicate pole position, races in italics indicate fastest lap)

Year	Bike	1	2	3	4	5	6	7	8	9	10	11	12	13	Pos	Pts
2004	Honda	SPA	AUS; 1	SMR	ITA	GER	GBR	GBR	NED	ITA	FRA				15th	25
2006	Ducati	QAT; 10	AUS; 6	SPA; 11	ITA	EUR	SMR	CZE	GBR	NED	GER	ITA	FRA		21st	21
2007	Honda	QAT	AUS	EUR	SPA	NED	ITA	EUR	SMR	CZE; 5	GBR; Ret	GER; 16	ITA; Ret	FRA; 7	28th	20
2008	Honda	QAT; 5	AUS; 2	SPA; Ret	NED; 6	ITA; 2	GER; 2	SMR; 14	CZE; 3	GBR; 5	EUR; 1	ITA; 12	FRA; 3	POR; 11	**3rd**	**162**

=== Superbike World Championship ===
==== Races by year ====
(key) (Races in bold indicate pole position, races in italics indicate fastest lap)

Year	Bike	1		2		3		4		5		6		7		8		9		10		11		12		13		14		Pos	Pts
Year	Bike	R1	R2	R1	R2	R1	R2	R1	R2	R1	R2	R1	R2	R1	R2	R1	R2	R1	R2	R1	R2	R1	R2	R1	R2	R1	R2	R1	R2	Pos	Pts
2006	Kawasaki	QAT	QAT	AUS	AUS	ESP	ESP	ITA	ITA	EUR; Ret	EUR; 18	SMR; 18	SMR; Ret	CZE; 18	CZE; Ret	GBR; 20	GBR; Ret	NED; Ret	NED; 15	GER; 20	GER; 23	ITA; 15	ITA; 17	FRA; 15	FRA; 16					28th	3
2007	Honda	QAT; Ret	QAT; 13	AUS; 12	AUS; 12	EUR; 12	EUR; 15	SPA; 9	SPA; 7	NED; Ret	NED; 13	ITA; 11	ITA; Ret	GBR; Ret	GBR; C	SMR	SMR	CZE	CZE	GBR	GBR	GER	GER	ITA	ITA	FRA	FRA			17th	40
2010	Honda	AUS; 19	AUS; 14	POR	POR	SPA	SPA	NED	NED	ITA	ITA	RSA	RSA	USA	USA	SMR	SMR	CZE	CZE	GBR; 16	GBR; 12	GER	GER	ITA	ITA	FRA	FRA			24th	6
2012	Suzuki	AUS; 16	AUS; 15	ITA	ITA	NED	NED	ITA	ITA	EUR	EUR	USA	USA	SMR	SMR	SPA	SPA	CZE	CZE	GBR	GBR	RUS	RUS	GER	GER	POR	POR	FRA	FRA	34th	1
2016	BMW	AUS; 10	AUS; 9	THA; 15	THA; 16	SPA; 13	SPA; 13	NED; 11	NED; Ret	ITA; 14	ITA; 13	MAL; 11	MAL; 12	GBR; 14	GBR; 9	ITA; 11	ITA; 14	USA; 13	USA; DNS	GER; 14	GER; 7	FRA; 12	FRA; 11	SPA; 10	SPA; 12	QAT; 15	QAT; DNS			14th	89
2017	Yamaha	AUS; Ret	AUS; 12	THA	THA	SPA	SPA	NED	NED	ITA	ITA	GBR	GBR	ITA	ITA	USA	USA	GER	GER	POR	POR	FRA	FRA	SPA	SPA	QAT	QAT			32nd	4

=== British Superbike Championship ===
==== Races by year ====
(key)

Year	Bike	1			2			3			4			5			6			7			8			9			10		11		12			Pos	Pts	Ref
Year	Bike	R1	R2	R3	R1	R2	R3	R1	R2	R3	R1	R2	R3	R1	R2	R3	R1	R2	R3	R1	R2	R3	R1	R2	R3	R1	R2	R3	R1	R2	R1	R2	R1	R2	R3	Pos	Pts	Ref
2009	Honda	BHI	BHI		OUL; 10	OUL; Ret		DON; DNS	DON; Ret		THR; 7	THR; 3		SNE; 3	SNE; 3		KNO; 3	KNO; 2		MAL; Ret	MAL; DNS		BHGP; EX^{1}	BHGP; EX^{1}	BHGP; EX^{1}	CAD; EX^{1}	CAD; EX^{1}		CRO; 3	CRO; 3	SIL; 3	SIL; 3	OUL; NC	OUL; 7	OUL; 3	4th	188	
2010	Honda	BHI; 5	BHI; Ret		THR; 2	THR; 1		OUL; 6	OUL; 8		CAD; 5	CAD; 1		MAL; 2	MAL; 2		KNO; 3	KNO; C		SNE; 1	SNE; 1	SNE; Ret	BHGP; 4	BHGP; Ret	BHGP; 6	CAD; 2	CAD; 1		CRO; 6	CRO; 8	SIL; 2	SIL; 3	OUL; 5	OUL; 3	OUL; 2	**2nd**	**625**^{2}	
2011	Suzuki	BHI; Ret	BHI; DNS		OUL; 6	OUL; Ret		CRO; 8	CRO; 4		THR; 9	THR; 6		KNO; 5	KNO; 13		SNE; 7	SNE; 2		OUL; 2	OUL; C		BHGP; 1	BHGP; 6	BHGP; Ret	CAD; DSQ	CAD; 4	CAD; 2	DON; 6	DON; 5	SIL; 4	SIL; 1	BHGP; 2	BHGP; Ret	BHGP; 6	5th	598^{2}	
2012	Suzuki	BHI; 10	BHI; C		THR; 3	THR; 1		OUL; 3	OUL; 3	OUL; 4	SNE; 3	SNE; 3		KNO; 4	KNO; 4		OUL; 2	OUL; 2	OUL; 3	BHGP; 2	BHGP; 2		CAD; 6	CAD; 2		DON; 1	DON; 1		ASS; 2	ASS; 1	SIL; 4	SIL; 3	BHGP; 3	BHGP; 2	BHGP; 2	**2nd**	**655**^{2}	
2013	Suzuki	BHI; 3	BHI; 5		THR; 2	THR; 4		OUL; 3	OUL; 2		KNO; 2	KNO; 2		SNE; 2	SNE; 3		BHGP; 1	BHGP; 4		OUL; 4	OUL; 2	OUL; 1	CAD; 3	CAD; Ret		DON; 4	DON; 5		ASS; 4	ASS; Ret	SIL; Ret	SIL; 5	BHGP; 1	BHGP; 1	BHGP; 1	**3rd**	**621**^{2}	
2014	Yamaha	BHI; Ret	BHI; 2		OUL; 2	OUL; 1		SNE; 2	SNE; Ret		KNO; 4	KNO; 4		BHGP; 6	BHGP; 8		THR; 1	THR; 1		OUL; 2	OUL; 2	OUL; 1	CAD; 4	CAD; DSQ		DON; 4	DON; 3		ASS; Ret	ASS; Ret	SIL; 3	SIL; Ret	BHGP; 8	BHGP; 4	BHGP; 5	4th	584^{3}	
2015	Yamaha	DON; 3	DON; 6		BHI; 3	BHI; 3		OUL; 2	OUL; 3		SNE; 2	SNE; 2		KNO; 3	KNO; 3		BHGP; 1	BHGP; 1		THR; 1	THR; 1		CAD; 1	CAD; 1		OUL; 4	OUL; 1	OUL; 2	ASS; 1	ASS; 1	SIL; 1	SIL; 1	BHGP; 1	BHGP; 1	BHGP; Ret	**1st**	**703**^{3}	
2017	Yamaha	DON; 7	DON; 2		BHI; 10	BHI; 4		OUL; 7	OUL; 6		KNO; Ret	KNO; 5		SNE; 2	SNE; 2		BHGP; 5	BHGP; Ret		THR; 1	THR; Ret		CAD; 12	CAD; 7		SIL; 2	SIL; 1	SIL; Ret	OUL; 3	OUL; 5	ASS; 5	ASS; 2	BHGP; 3	BHGP; 4	BHGP; 1	**2nd**	**634**^{3}	
2018	Yamaha	DON; 12	DON; 11		BHI; 13	BHI; 5		OUL; 6	OUL; 6		SNE; 4	SNE; 3		KNO; 8	KNO; Ret		BHGP; 1	BHGP; 1		THR; 4	THR; 1		CAD; 10	CAD; Ret		SIL; 4	SIL; 2	SIL; 6	OUL; Ret	OUL; 5	ASS; 9	ASS; 2	BHGP; 7	BHGP; 9	BHGP; 5	4th	584^{3}	
2019	Ducati	SIL; Ret	SIL; Ret		OUL; 1	OUL; 1		DON; Ret	DON; 4	DON; 5	BRH; 1	BRH; 1		KNO; 8	KNO; 4		SNE; 2	SNE; 2		THR; 3	THR; 1		CAD; 2	CAD; 1		OUL; 1	OUL; 2	OUL; Ret	ASS; 2	ASS; 4	DON; 3	DON; 2	BHGP; 1	BHGP; 1	BHGP; 1	**2nd**	**692**^{3}	
2020	Ducati	DON; 3	DON; 6	DON; Ret	SNE; 2	SNE; 1	SNE; 5	SIL; 6	SIL; 2	SIL; 6	OUL; 8	OUL; 4	OUL; 1	DON; 3	DON; 1	DON; 3	BRH; 4	BRH; 1	BRH; 1																	**1st**	**288**	

Year	Bike	1			2			3			4			5			6			7			8			9			10			11			Pos	Pts
Year	Bike	R1	R2	R3	R1	R2	R3	R1	R2	R3	R1	R2	R3	R1	R2	R3	R1	R2	R3	R1	R2	R3	R1	R2	R3	R1	R2	R3	R1	R2	R3	R1	R2	R3	Pos	Pts
2021	Ducati	OUL; 10	OUL; 7	OUL; 6	KNO; 10	KNO; 12	KNO; 13	BHGP; 9	BHGP; 18	BHGP; 5	THR; 17	THR; 16	THR; 18	DON; 18	DON; 10	DON; 4	CAD; 10	CAD; 5	CAD; 5	SNE; 4	SNE; 4	SNE; 6	SIL; 4	SIL; 3	SIL; 3	**OUL**; 2	OUL; Ret	OUL; 2	DON; Ret	DON; 11	DON; Ret	BHGP; 7	BHGP; 6	BHGP; 4	6th	1079
2022	Ducati	SIL; 13	SIL; 11	SIL; 18	OUL; 4	OUL; 10	OUL; 8	DON; 13	DON; 10	DON; 8	KNO; 10	KNO; 6	KNO; 7	BRH; 6	BRH; Ret	BRH; Ret	THR; 20	THR; 15	THR; Ret	CAD; 10	CAD; Ret	CAD; 11	SNE; 13	SNE; 12	SNE; 11	OUL; 10	OUL; 8	OUL; 8	DON; 11	DON; 9	DON; 16	BRH; Ret	BRH; 9	BRH; 7	14th	161
2023	BMW	SIL; 3	SIL; 1	SIL; 2	**OUL**; 1	OUL; 6	OUL; 5	DON; 6	DON; 3	DON; 13	KNO; 9	KNO; 9	KNO; 8	SNE; 2	SNE; 2	SNE; Ret	BRH; 12	BRH; 9	BRH; Ret	THR; 15	THR; 17	THR; 22	CAD; 8	CAD; 8	CAD; 8	OUL; 5	OUL; 5	OUL; 5	DON; 7	DON; 8	DON; 3	BRH; 7	BRH; 8	BRH; 9	7th	340
2024	BMW	NAV; Ret	NAV; 11		OUL; 9	OUL; 7	OUL; 8	DON; 10	DON; 8	DON; Ret	KNO; 6	KNO; 12	KNO; 11	SNE; 13	SNE; 10	SNE; 7	BRH; 11	BRH; 8	BRH; 11	THR; 16	THR; 4	THR; 8	CAD; 7	CAD; 7	CAD; 6	OUL; 4	OUL; 16	OUL; 10	DON; 9	DON; 10	DON; 11	BRH; 7	BRH; 5	BRH; 6	8th	249
2025	Honda	OUL; 9	OUL; 13	OUL; C	DON; 3	DON; 6	DON; 6	SNE; 9	SNE; 7	SNE; 6	KNO; 6	KNO; 10	KNO; Ret	BRH; 9	BRH; 10	BRH; 9	THR; 12	THR; 13	THR; 14	CAD; 12	CAD; 11	CAD; 10	DON	DON	DON	ASS	ASS	ASS	OUL	OUL	OUL	BRH; 12	BRH; 11	BRH; 11	11th*	224*

^{*} Season still in progress.

===== Notes =====
1. – Brookes was excluded from the rounds due to causing an accident during Race 1 at Mallory Park.
2. – 2010–2013 Brookes qualified for "The Showdown" part of the BSB season, thus before the 10th round he was awarded 500 points plus the podium credits he had gained throughout the season. Podium credits are given to anyone finishing 1st, 2nd or 3rd, with 3, 2 and 1 points awarded respectively.
3. – 2014–2019 Brookes qualified for "The Showdown" part of the BSB season, thus before the 10th round he was awarded 500 points plus the podium credits he had gained throughout the season. Podium credits are given to anyone finishing 1st, 2nd or 3rd, with 5, 3 and 1 points awarded respectively.

=== Superstock 1000 ===
==== Races by year ====
(key) (Races in bold indicate pole position, races in italics indicate fastest lap)

Year	Bike	1	2	3	4	5	6	7	8	9	10	11	12	13	14	Pos	Pts	Ref
2010	Honda	BHI	THR	OUL	CAD	MAL	SIL; 1	SIL; 1	KNO	SNE	BHGP	CAD	CRO	OUL	OUL	13th	50	

=== Suzuka 8 Hours results ===
Year	Team	Riders	Bike	Pos
2025	(Japan) Honda Dream RT SAKURAI HONDA	(Australia) Josh Brookes (Japan) Kazuki Ito (Japan) Daijiro Hiura	Honda CBR1000RR	34th
