= 2020 British Superbike Championship =

British motorcycle racing season

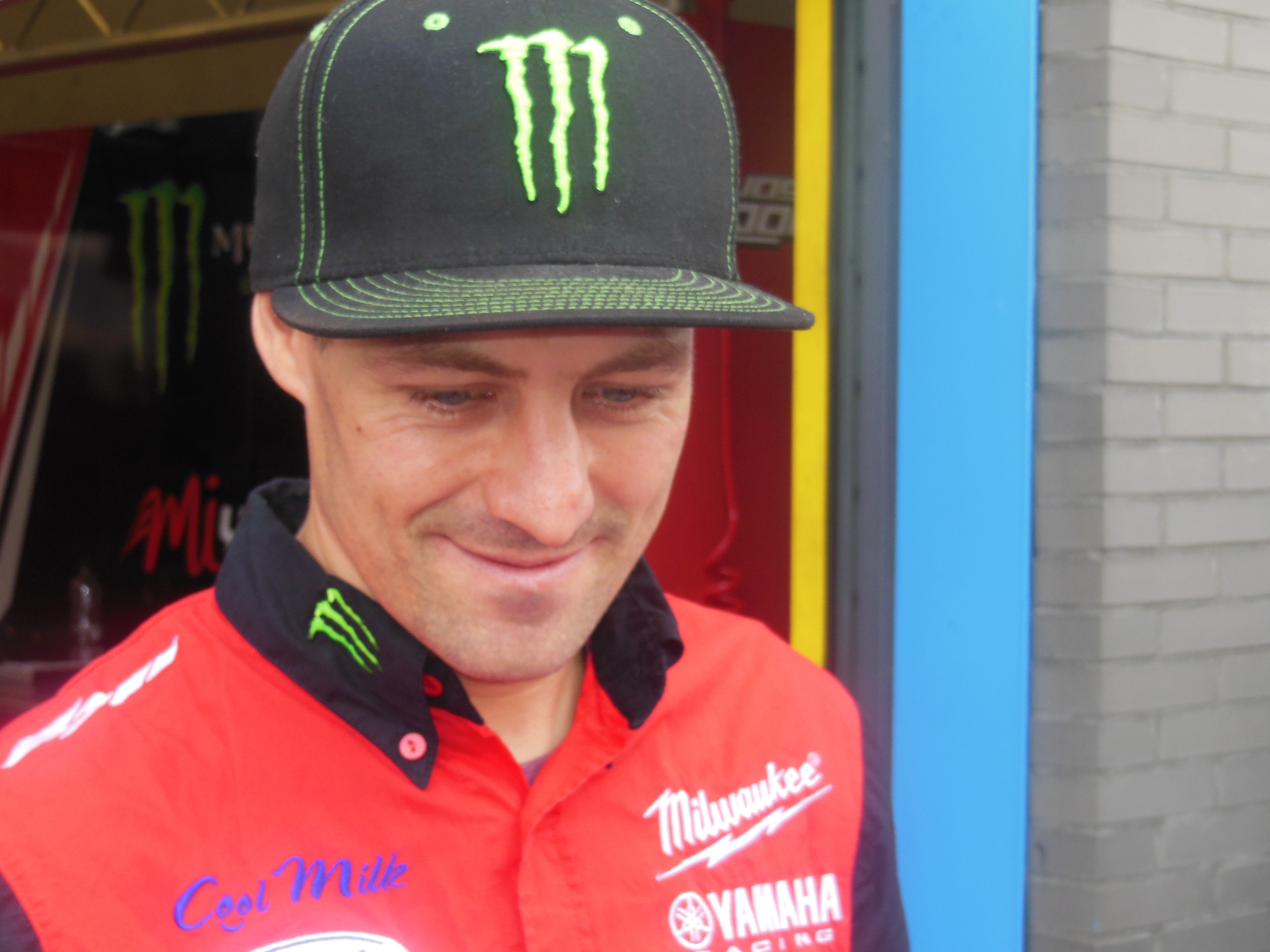
2020 champion, Josh Brookes

The 2020 British Superbike Championship season was the 33rd British Superbike Championship season. The year was heavily affected by the pandemic, with the showdown being cancelled because of the late season start. Josh Brookes was the riders' champion on the VisionTrack Ducati Panigale V4. He finished ahead of fellow australian Jason O'Halloran.

== Teams and riders ==
2020 Entry List
Team	Constructor	No.	Rider	Rounds
Honda Racing	Honda	2	(Northern Ireland) Glenn Irwin	All
Honda Racing	Honda	18	(Northern Ireland) Andrew Irwin	All
Team 64 Motorsport MET Healthcare	Kawasaki	3	(Northern Ireland) Graeme Irwin	All
Santander Salt TAG Racing	Yamaha	4	(England) Dan Linfoot	1–2
Santander Salt TAG Racing	Yamaha	41	(Republic of Ireland) Jack Kennedy	1–2
RAF Regular and Reserves Kawasaki	Kawasaki	7	(England) Ryan Vickers	All
RAF Regular and Reserves Kawasaki	Kawasaki	41	(Republic of Ireland) Jack Kennedy	4–6
NP Motorcycles/Lextek	BMW	8	(Australia) Lachlan Epis	6
NP Motorcycles/Lextek	BMW	27	(South Africa) Bjorn Estment	1–5
The Roadhouse Macau Racing by ON 1	BMW	11	(Republic of Ireland) Brian McCormack	All
Rich Energy OMG Racing	BMW	12	(England) Luke Mossey	All
Rich Energy OMG Racing	BMW	80	(Spain) Héctor Barberá	All
Massingberd-Mundy Kawasaki (1–2); Rapid Fulfillment FS-3 Kawasaki (3–6)	Kawasaki	14	(England) Lee Jackson	All
Massingberd-Mundy Kawasaki (1–2); Rapid Fulfillment FS-3 Kawasaki (3–6)	Kawasaki	83	(England) Danny Buchan	All
Bike Devil	Kawasaki	20	(England) Tom Ward	2–5
Bike Devil	Kawasaki	44	(England) Gino Rea	1
Bike Devil	Kawasaki	59	(England) Matt Truelove	6
VisionTrack Ducati	Ducati	21	(England) Christian Iddon	All
VisionTrack Ducati	Ducati	25	(Australia) Josh Brookes	All
McAMS Yamaha	Yamaha	22	(Australia) Jason O'Halloran	All
McAMS Yamaha	Yamaha	95	(Scotland) Tarran Mackenzie	All
Powerslide/Catfoss Racing	Suzuki	27	(South Africa) Bjorn Estment	6
SYNETIQ BMW Motorrad	BMW	28	(England) Bradley Ray	All
SYNETIQ BMW Motorrad	BMW	99	(Scotland) Taylor Mackenzie	All
Buildbase Suzuki	Suzuki	33	(Northern Ireland) Keith Farmer	1, 4–5
Buildbase Suzuki	Suzuki	44	(England) Gino Rea	2–3, 6
Buildbase Suzuki	Suzuki	44	(England) Gino Rea	4–5
Buildbase Suzuki	Suzuki	77	(England) Kyle Ryde	All
Global Robots BMW	BMW	37	(Germany) Markus Reiterberger	5
Global Robots BMW	BMW	60	(England) Peter Hickman	All
Global Robots BMW	BMW	75	(England) Alex Olsen	1–3
Lloyd & Jones Bowker Motorrad	BMW	40	(England) Joe Francis	All
Oxford Products Racing	Ducati	46	(England) Tommy Bridewell	All
CDH Racing	Kawasaki	65	(England) Josh Owens	All
GR Motorsport	Kawasaki	79	(England) Storm Stacey	All

Key
Regular rider
Wildcard rider
Replacement rider

- All entries used Pirelli tyres.

== Race calendar and results ==
2020 calendar
Round		Circuit	Date	Pole position	Fastest lap	Winning rider	Winning team
1	R1	(England) Donington Park National	8 August	(Australia) Jason O'Halloran	(Australia) Josh Brookes	(Northern Ireland) Andrew Irwin	Honda Racing
1	R2	(England) Donington Park National	9 August		(England) Tommy Bridewell	(Northern Ireland) Andrew Irwin	Honda Racing
1	R3	(England) Donington Park National	9 August		(Spain) Héctor Barberá	(England) Tommy Bridewell	Oxford Products Racing
2	R1	(England) Snetterton 300	22 August	(England) Danny Buchan	(Northern Ireland) Glenn Irwin	(England) Christian Iddon	VisionTrack Ducati
2	R2	(England) Snetterton 300	23 August		(England) Christian Iddon	(Australia) Josh Brookes	VisionTrack Ducati
2	R3	(England) Snetterton 300	23 August		(England) Tommy Bridewell	(Northern Ireland) Glenn Irwin	Honda Racing
3	R1	(England) Silverstone National	5 September	(England) Danny Buchan	(Australia) Jason O'Halloran	(Scotland) Tarran Mackenzie	McAMS Yamaha
3	R2	(England) Silverstone National	6 September		(England) Kyle Ryde	(England) Kyle Ryde	Buildbase Suzuki
3	R3	(England) Silverstone National	6 September		(England) Kyle Ryde	(England) Kyle Ryde	Buildbase Suzuki
4	R1	(England) Oulton Park International	19 September	(Australia) Jason O'Halloran	(Australia) Jason O'Halloran	(Australia) Jason O'Halloran	McAMS Yamaha
4	R2	(England) Oulton Park International	20 September		(Australia) Josh Brookes	(Australia) Jason O'Halloran	McAMS Yamaha
4	R3	(England) Oulton Park International	20 September		(Australia) Jason O'Halloran	(Australia) Josh Brookes	VisionTrack Ducati
5	R1	(England) Donington Park GP	4 October	(Australia) Josh Brookes	(Republic of Ireland) Jack Kennedy	(Northern Ireland) Andrew Irwin	Honda Racing
5	R2	(England) Donington Park GP	4 October		(Australia) Jason O'Halloran	(Australia) Josh Brookes	VisionTrack Ducati
5	R3	(England) Donington Park GP	4 October		(Scotland) Tarran Mackenzie	(Scotland) Tarran Mackenzie	McAMS Yamaha
6	R1	(England) Brands Hatch GP	17 October	(Australia) Josh Brookes	(Australia) Jason O'Halloran	(Australia) Jason O'Halloran	McAMS Yamaha
6	R2	(England) Brands Hatch GP	18 October		(Scotland) Tarran Mackenzie	(Australia) Josh Brookes	VisionTrack Ducati
6	R3	(England) Brands Hatch GP	18 October		(Scotland) Tarran Mackenzie	(Australia) Josh Brookes	VisionTrack Ducati

== Championship standings ==
=== Riders' championship ===
Scoring system

Points are awarded to the top fifteen finishers. A rider has to finish the race to earn points.

Position	**1st**	**2nd**	**3rd**	**4th**	**5th**	**6th**	**7th**	**8th**	**9th**	**10th**	**11th**	**12th**	**13th**	**14th**	**15th**
Points	25	20	16	13	11	10	9	8	7	6	5	4	3	2	1

Pos	Rider	Bike	DON (England)			SNE (England)			SIL (England)			OUL (England)			DON (England)			BRH (England)			Pts
1	(Australia) Josh Brookes	Ducati	3	**6**	Ret	2	1	5	6	2	6	8	4	**1**	**3**	1	3	**4**	1	1	288
2	(Australia) Jason O'Halloran	Yamaha	**8**	3	3	8	8	7	3	**3**	3	**1**	**1**	4	14	2	**8**	1	**2**	3	267
3	(England) Christian Iddon	Ducati	4	8	4	1	5	**3**	8	13	7	2	2	2	2	6	4	2	3	4	258
4	(Northern Ireland) Glenn Irwin	Honda	2	2	2	4	**2**	1	4	4	4	5	Ret	6	Ret	7	2	6	12	11	226
5	(Scotland) Tarran Mackenzie	Yamaha	7	7	6	7	7	6	1	Ret	2	9	6	9	4	3	1	3	Ret	**2**	215
6	(Northern Ireland) Andrew Irwin	Honda	1	1	DSQ	Ret	Ret	8	5	9	9	4	7	Ret	1	Ret	7	7	4	5	172
7	(England) Tommy Bridewell	Ducati	5	9	**1**	3	3	2	10	6	5	14	11	11	15	5	Ret	9	10	7	168
8	(England) Lee Jackson	Kawasaki	10	13	9	6	4	4	7	7	8	6	5	3	10	Ret	6	8	5	9	157
9	(England) Kyle Ryde	Suzuki	Ret	4	7	10	6	10	2	1	**1**	Ret	13	13	8	Ret	14	14	11	Ret	137
10	(England) Danny Buchan	Kawasaki	Ret	5	5	**Ret**	Ret	11	**9**	8	11	3	3	5	9	Ret	12	5	7	6	131
11	(England) Luke Mossey	BMW	6	17	13	12	9	12	11	Ret	10	11	9	10	11	9	9	11	6	12	95
12	(England) Gino Rea	Kawasaki	Ret	19	12																89
12	(England) Gino Rea	Suzuki				11	12	13	Ret	12	14	10	12	12	6	4	5	10	9	10	89
13	(England) Bradley Ray	BMW	Ret	12	14	5	10	9	12	5	13	7	8	7	DNS	DNS	DNS	Ret	Ret	14	76
14	(England) Peter Hickman	BMW	12	18	11	13	11	Ret	14	11	15	12	10	8	12	Ret	11	13	8	8	71
15	(England) Ryan Vickers	Kawasaki	9	11	8	9	Ret	Ret	15	Ret	17	13	14	15	5	Ret	Ret	DNS	DNS	DNS	45
16	(Republic of Ireland) Jack Kennedy	Yamaha	13	15	Ret	17	13	Ret													34
16	(Republic of Ireland) Jack Kennedy	Kawasaki										Ret	Ret	17	7	**8**	13	12	13	Ret	34
17	(Spain) Héctor Barberá	BMW	Ret	10	10	14	Ret	15	13	10	12	18	15	14	22	Ret	Ret	16	Ret	15	32
18	(England) Joe Francis	BMW	Ret	16	15	15	14	14	Ret	14	16	Ret	Ret	16	17	10	10	15	Ret	13	24
19	(Northern Ireland) Keith Farmer	Suzuki	DNS	DNS	DNS							15	Ret	18	13	11	15				10
20	(England) Alex Olsen	BMW	11	14	Ret	Ret	15	Ret	DNS	DNS	DNS										8
21	(Scotland) Taylor Mackenzie	BMW	15	22	17	18	Ret	Ret	16	16	18	16	Ret	20	20	12	17	17	14	16	7
22	(England) Storm Stacey	Kawasaki	16	20	16	19	17	17	17	15	19	17	16	Ret	19	13	16	18	16	17	4
23	(Germany) Markus Reiterberger	BMW													21	14	18				2
24	(England) Dan Linfoot	Yamaha	14	Ret	Ret	DNS	DNS	DNS													2
25	(England) Josh Owens	Kawasaki	18	Ret	20	21	18	18	Ret	Ret	20	19	17	19	DNS	DNS	DNS	19	15	18	1
26	(Northern Ireland) Graeme Irwin	Kawasaki	Ret	21	18	20	DNS	Ret	19	18	22	20	18	21	16	15	19	Ret	Ret	Ret	1
	(England) Tom Ward	Kawasaki				16	16	16	18	17	21	Ret	Ret	Ret	DNS	DNS	DNS				0
	(South Africa) Bjorn Estment	BMW	17	23	19	Ret	19	19	21	Ret	Ret	21	Ret	Ret	23	16	DNS				0
	(South Africa) Bjorn Estment	Suzuki																21	17	19	0
	(England) Ian Hutchinson	BMW													18	Ret	DNS				0
	(Republic of Ireland) Brian McCormack	BMW	19	24	21	22	20	20	20	Ret	23	22	19	Ret	Ret	Ret	DNS	20	Ret	Ret	0
	(Australia) Lachlan Epis	BMW																22	Ret	DNS	0
	(England) Matt Truelove	Kawasaki																DNS	DNS	DNS	0
Pos	Rider	Bike	DON (England)			SNE (England)			SIL (England)			OUL (England)			DON (England)			BRH (England)			Pts

Colour	Result
Gold	Winner
Silver	Second place
Bronze	Third place
Green	Points classification
Blue	Non-points classification
Blue	Non-classified finish (NC)
Purple	Retired, not classified (Ret)
Red	Did not qualify (DNQ)
Red	Did not pre-qualify (DNPQ)
Black	Disqualified (DSQ)
White	Did not start (DNS)
White	Withdrew (WD)
White	Race cancelled (C)
Blank	Did not practice (DNP)
Blank	Did not arrive (DNA)
Blank	Excluded (EX)

**Bold** – Pole position
Italics – Fastest lap
