= John Laverty =

British motorcycle racer (born 1982)

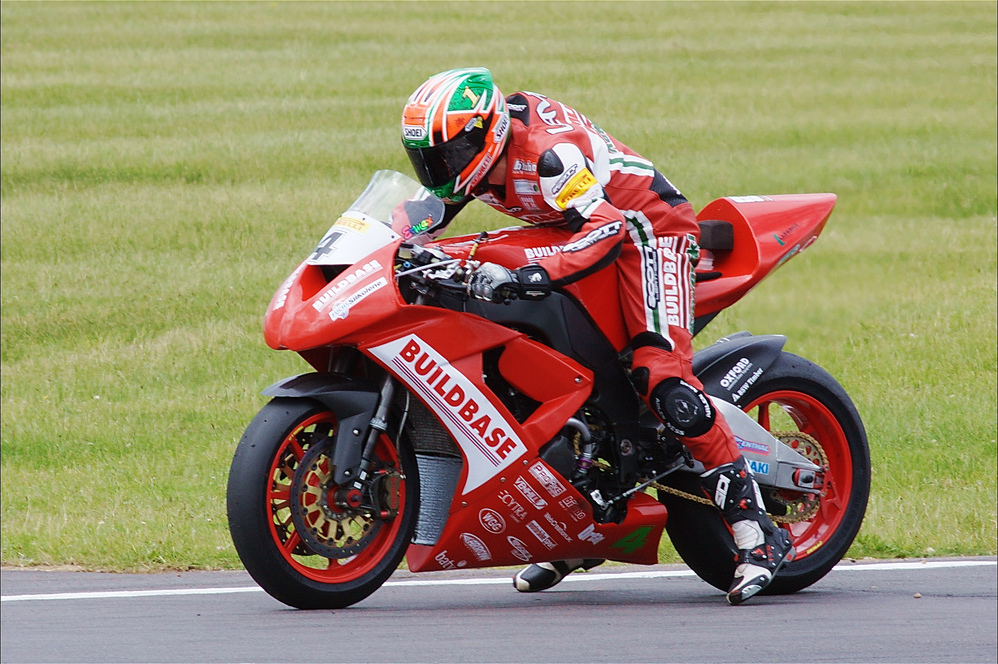
- John Laverty riding the Buildbase Kawasaki during the 2009 BSB championship at Snetterton
- Nationality: Irish
- Born: 6 July 1982 (age 44); Toome / Toomebridge, County Antrim, Northern Ireland

John Laverty (born 6 July 1982) is a Northern Irish former motorcycle racer from Toomebridge, Northern Ireland. He was champion of the Cup class of the British Superbike Championship in 2008. His older brother Michael and younger brother Eugene are both also notable racers.

== Personal life ==
In his youth he was a keen tennis player. His sporting heroes are George Best and John McEnroe He also enjoys Trials Riding and Golf

== Early career ==
Laverty raced motocross in his youth, switching to circuit racing for the 1999 Aprillia Challenge UK. The early part of his career was affected by injuries, however he scored a single European Superstock podium at Imola in 2003 and finished 7th overall in 2004. He first entered the British Superbike Championship in 2005, but pulled out when the bike proved uncompetitive. He spent the next 2½ years in British Superstock, taking over a ride midseason (and ultimately earning long-term backing from the team's sponsor Buildbase). He came close to a first win at Donington 2005 and Oulton Park 2006, and it finally came at Brands Hatch in 2007. he was 5th overall in the series in 2006 and 4th overall in 2007.

== British Superstock/Superbike Cup ==
For 2008 Laverty was entered by the Northwest 200 Ducati team into the British Superstock Championship, which allows few modifications to basic road bikes. Three days before the season started, the team discovered that the bike was ineligible. They instead entered him into the British Superbike Cup, as a team-mate to the veteran Michael Rutter. Laverty qualified 9th overall for the season opener, and lead the Cup class throughout, winning it comfortably in the end, taking 11 class wins and 9 further podiums despite missing the Knockhill round due to injury. He finished 17th overall, with a best overall result of 8th, although fellow Cup entrant Gary Mason outpointed him in the main class due to a strong finish He finished 2008 by contesting the Kings of Wanneroo meeting in Perth, Australia, which for 2008 was run to Superstock regulations

== British Superbike Championship ==
For 2009 he switched to the Hawk Kawasaki team, taking Buildbase as title sponsor. After a slow start to the season in the first event, at Oulton Park Laverty narrowly escaped serious injury after he went on the grass to overtake and subsequently fell casing a red flag, he was unable to make race 2 due to a concussion. Laverty earned his best finish of the year at Mallory Park finishing 4th in race 2

=== 2010 ===
Laverty remained with Buildbase for 2010, scoring his first podium finish at Oulton Park. The rest of the year saw mid-pack finishes, ending the season in 8th place with 190 points

=== 2011 ===
The 2011 season saw John ride again for Buildbase but this time astride the BMW S1000RR. The season did not start well as technical issues prevailed. But as the season continued the team worked hard to resolve these issues At the second visit to Oulton Park mid season towards the end of Free Practice 1 John suffered a serious crash on the start-finish straight leaving him with serious injuries. This unfortunately ended his 2011 season.

=== 2012 ===
The 2012 season promises to be a challenge for John as he gets to sit astride an Aprilia RSV4 Superbike for the first time with the Spiltlath Redmond Team.

== Career statistics ==
2004 - 8th, Superstock European Championship, Kawasaki ZX-10R, Suzuki GSX-R1000
2005 - 21st, FIM Superstock 1000 Cup, Suzuki

=== Races by year ===
==== Superstock European Championship ====
(key) (Races in bold indicate pole position) (Races in italics indicate fastest lap)

Year	Bike	1	2	3	4	5	6	7	8	9	Pos	Pts
2003	Suzuki	VAL; 14	MNZ; Ret	OSC; WD	SIL; 19	SMR; 18	BRA; 9	NED; 14	IMO; 3	MAG; 10	14th	33
2004	Suzuki/Yamaha	VAL; 13	SMR; 21	MNZ; 6	OSC; 10	SIL; Ret	BRA; 8	NED; 9	IMO; 4	MAG; 4	8th	60

=== FIM Superstock 1000 Cup ===
==== Races by year ====
(key) (Races in bold indicate pole position) (Races in italics indicate fastest lap)

Year	Bike	1	2	3	4	5	6	7	8	9	10	Pos	Pts
2005	Suzuki	VAL	MNZ	SIL	SMR	BRN	BRA; 12	NED; Ret	LAU; Ret	IMO; 13	MAG; 11	21st	12

=== British Superbike Championship ===
Year	Class	Bike	THR		OUL		BHGP		DON		SNE		MAL		OUL		KNO		CAD		CRO		SIL		BHI		Pos	Pts	Ref
Year	Class	Bike	R1	R2	R1	R2	R1	R2	R1	R2	R1	R2	R1	R2	R1	R2	R1	R2	R1	R2	R1	R2	R1	R2	R1	R2	Pos	Pts	Ref
2008	BSB	Ducati	12	11	20	14	16	13	16	16	16	16	10	14	10	13			14	15	16	16	13	21	13	8	17th	49	

Year	Class	Bike	BHI		OUL		DON		THR		SNE		KNO		MAL		BHGP			CAD		CRO		SIL		OUL			Pos	Pts	Ref
Year	Class	Bike	R1	R2	R1	R2	R1	R2	R1	R2	R1	R2	R1	R2	R1	R2	R1	R2	R3	R1	R2	R1	R2	R1	R2	R1	R2	R3	Pos	Pts	Ref
2009	BSB	Kawasaki	12	13	Ret	DNS	9	9	8	11	13	5	Ret	Ret	Ret	4	7	13	5	9	5	13	10	6	Ret	10	6	Ret	10th	130.5	

Year	Class	Bike	BHI (England)		THR (England)		OUL (England)		CAD (England)		MAL (England)		KNO (Scotland)		SNE (England)			BHGP (England)			CAD (England)		CRO (England)		SIL (England)		OUL (England)			Pos	Pts	Ref
Year	Class	Bike	R1	R2	R1	R2	R1	R2	R1	R2	R1	R2	R1	R2	R1	R2	R3	R1	R2	R3	R1	R2	R1	R2	R1	R2	R1	R2	R3	Pos	Pts	Ref
2010	BSB	Kawasaki	10	7	7	8	3	5	6	5	8	6	6	C	12	10	5	9	Ret	9	Ret	12	8	13	Ret	9	9	6	8	8th	190	

Year	Class	Bike	BHI (England)		OUL (England)		CRO (England)		THR (England)		KNO (Scotland)		SNE (England)		OUL (England)		BHGP (England)			CAD (England)			DON (England)		SIL (England)		BHGP (England)			Pos	Pts	Ref
Year	Class	Bike	R1	R2	R1	R2	R1	R2	R1	R2	R1	R2	R1	R2	R1	R2	R1	R2	R3	R1	R2	R3	R1	R2	R1	R2	R1	R2	R3	Pos	Pts	Ref
2011	BSB	BMW	Ret	DNS	DNS	DNS	13	21	20	13	18	23	22	DNS	DNS	C														32nd	6	

Year	Class	Bike	1		2		3			4		5		6			7			8			9			10		11			Pos	Pts	Ref
Year	Class	Bike	R1	R2	R1	R2	R1	R2	R3	R1	R2	R1	R2	R1	R2	R3	R1	R2	R3	R1	R2	R3	R1	R2	R3	R1	R2	R1	R2	R3	Pos	Pts	Ref
2012	BSB	Aprilia	BHI; 21	BHI; C	THR; 25	THR; 26	OUL; 20	OUL; 24	OUL; 21	SNE; 18	SNE; 18	KNO; 18	KNO; Ret	OUL; Ret	OUL; Ret	OUL; 22	BHGP; 21	BHGP; 20	CAD; Ret	CAD; DNS	DON; DNS	DON; DNS	ASS	ASS		SIL; 20	SIL; 21	BHGP; 18	BHGP; 13	BHGP; 18	33rd	3	
