= 2009 British Superbike Championship =

British motorcycle racing season

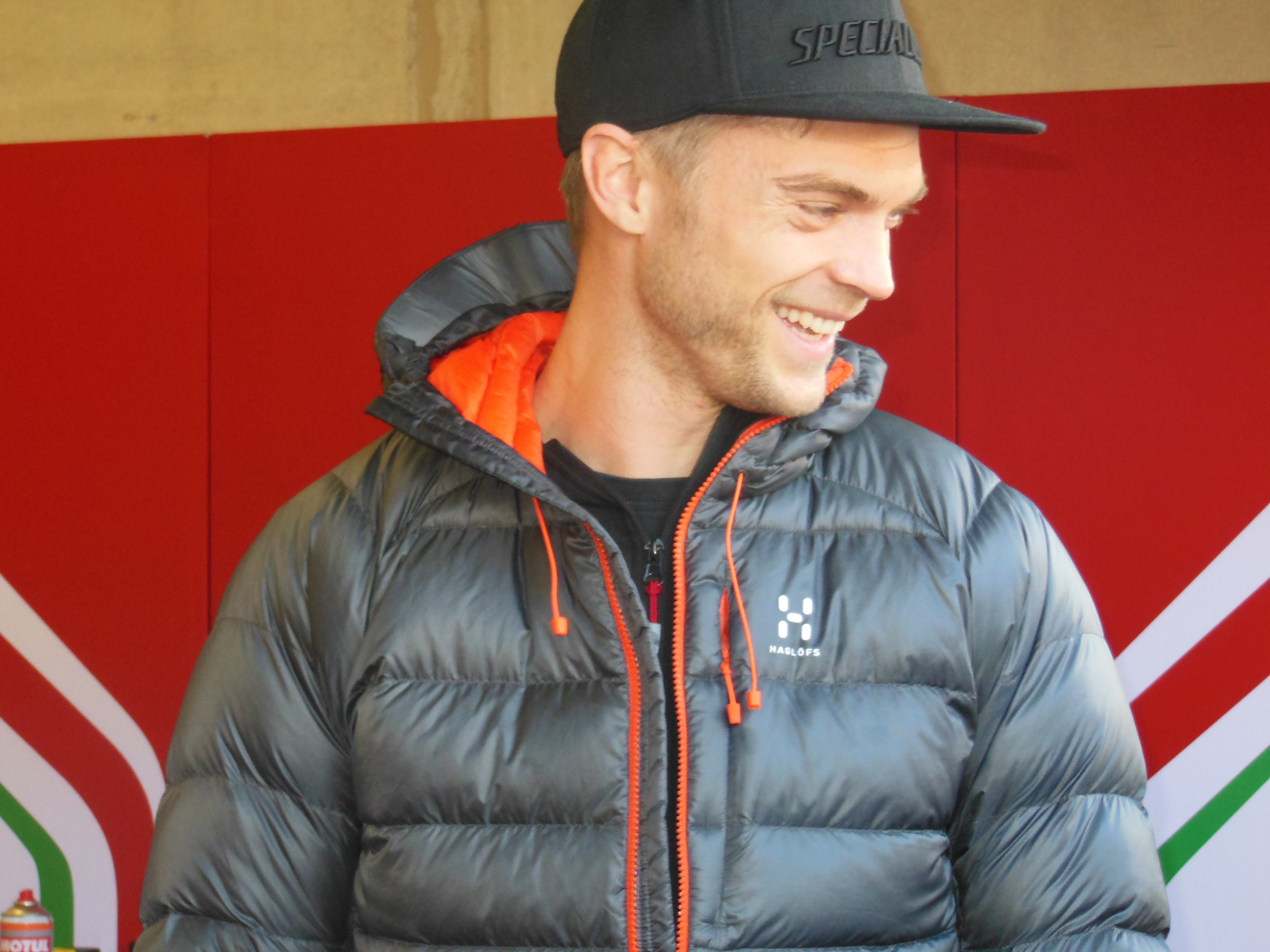
2009 champion, Leon Camier

The 2009 British Superbike season was the 22nd British Superbike Championship season. It began at Brands Hatch on 13 April, ending at Oulton Park on 11 October after 26 races held in England and Scotland.

None of the top four from the 2008 championship returned, as Shane Byrne, Leon Haslam and Tom Sykes moved into the Superbike World Championship, with Cal Crutchlow leaving for the Supersport World Championship.

Having lost his MotoGP ride, Sylvain Guintoli moved into the championship, joining the Worx Crescent Suzuki team on a GSX-R1000. HM Plant Honda had an all-new all-Australian line-up, with former World Supersport Championship front-runner Josh Brookes and reigning British Supersport Champion Glen Richards. Reigning champions GSE Racing switched from Ducati to Yamaha, retaining Leon Camier and adding James Ellison to the team. Chris Walker made a return to the championship on a Motorpoint/Henderson Yamaha.

Camier won the title in dominant fashion, winning a series record nineteen races during the season. Team-mate Ellison finished as runner-up with Stuart Easton third. Gary Mason was just as dominant in the Privateers Cup, winning eighteen races en route to the title.

== Calendar ==
- In a twist to the championship, MotorSport Vision announced that two of the rounds would consist of a triple-header meeting, instead of the usual double-header.

2009 Calendar
Round		Circuit	Date	Pole position	Fastest lap	Winning rider	Winning team	Ref
1	R1	(England) Brands Hatch Indy	13 April	(France) Sylvain Guintoli	(Australia) Glen Richards	(France) Sylvain Guintoli	Worx Crescent Suzuki	
1	R2	(England) Brands Hatch Indy	13 April	(France) Sylvain Guintoli	(Scotland) Stuart Easton	(England) Leon Camier	Airwaves Yamaha	
2	R1	(England) Oulton Park	4 May	(England) Leon Camier	(England) Leon Camier	(England) Leon Camier	Airwaves Yamaha	
2	R2	(England) Oulton Park	4 May	(England) Leon Camier	(England) Leon Camier	(England) Leon Camier	Airwaves Yamaha	
3	R1	(England) Donington Park	25 May	(England) Leon Camier	(England) Leon Camier	(England) Leon Camier	Airwaves Yamaha	
3	R2	(England) Donington Park	25 May	(England) Leon Camier	(England) James Ellison	(England) James Ellison	Airwaves Yamaha	
4	R1	(England) Thruxton	31 May	(England) Leon Camier	(England) Leon Camier	(England) Leon Camier	Airwaves Yamaha	
4	R2	(England) Thruxton	31 May	(England) Leon Camier	(England) Leon Camier	(England) Leon Camier	Airwaves Yamaha	
5	R1	(England) Snetterton	21 June	(England) Leon Camier	(England) Leon Camier	(England) Leon Camier	Airwaves Yamaha	
5	R2	(England) Snetterton	21 June	(England) Leon Camier	(England) Leon Camier	(England) Leon Camier	Airwaves Yamaha	
6	R1	(Scotland) Knockhill	5 July	(Australia) Josh Brookes	(England) Leon Camier	(England) Leon Camier	Airwaves Yamaha	
6	R2	(Scotland) Knockhill	5 July	(Australia) Josh Brookes	(England) Leon Camier	(England) Leon Camier	Airwaves Yamaha	
7	R1	(England) Mallory Park	19 July	(England) Leon Camier	(England) James Ellison	(England) James Ellison	Airwaves Yamaha	
7	R2	(England) Mallory Park	19 July	(England) Leon Camier	(England) Leon Camier	(England) Leon Camier	Airwaves Yamaha	
8	R1	(England) Brands Hatch GP	8 August	(England) Leon Camier	(Australia) Broc Parkes	(England) Leon Camier	Airwaves Yamaha	
8	R2	(England) Brands Hatch GP	9 August	(England) Leon Camier	(England) Leon Camier	(England) Leon Camier	Airwaves Yamaha	
8	R3	(England) Brands Hatch GP	9 August	(England) Leon Camier	(England) Leon Camier	(England) Leon Camier	Airwaves Yamaha	
9	R1	(England) Cadwell Park	31 August	(England) Leon Camier	(England) Leon Camier	(England) Leon Camier	Airwaves Yamaha	
9	R2	(England) Cadwell Park	31 August	(England) Leon Camier	(England) James Ellison	(England) James Ellison	Airwaves Yamaha	
10	R1	(England) Croft	13 September	(England) Leon Camier	(England) Leon Camier	(Scotland) Stuart Easton	Hydrex Honda	
10	R2	(England) Croft	13 September	(England) Leon Camier	(England) Leon Camier	(England) Leon Camier	Airwaves Yamaha	
11	R1	(England) Silverstone International	27 September	(England) Leon Camier	(England) Leon Camier	(England) Leon Camier	Airwaves Yamaha	
11	R2	(England) Silverstone International	27 September	(England) Leon Camier	(England) Leon Camier	(England) James Ellison	Airwaves Yamaha	
12	R1	(England) Oulton Park	10 October	(Scotland) Stuart Easton	(England) James Ellison	(Scotland) Stuart Easton	Hydrex Honda	
12	R2	(England) Oulton Park	11 October	(Scotland) Stuart Easton	(Scotland) Stuart Easton	(England) Leon Camier	Airwaves Yamaha	
12	R3	(England) Oulton Park	11 October	(Scotland) Stuart Easton	(England) Leon Camier	(England) Leon Camier	Airwaves Yamaha	

=== Support Races ===
- Fuchs-Silkolene British Supersport Championship – Champion: Steve Plater
- Focused Events RC8 Super – Champion: Dave Wood
- Metzeler National Superstock 1000 Championship – Champion: Alastair Seeley
- Metzeler National Superstock 600 Championship – Champion: Jamie Hamilton
- Relentless 125 GP British Championship – Champion: James Lodge

== Entry list ==
Round By Round Entry List:	BHI	OUL	DON	THR	SNE	KNO	MAL	BHGP	CAD	CRO	SIL	OUL
Ref												

2009 Entry List
Team	Bike	No	Riders	Class	Rounds
MAR Racing Kawasaki	Kawasaki Ninja ZX-10R	0	(England) Malcolm Ashley	C	3
MAR Racing Kawasaki	Kawasaki Ninja ZX-10R	111	(England) Malcolm Ashley	C	4
MAR Racing Kawasaki	Kawasaki Ninja ZX-10R	111	(Republic of Ireland) Brian McCormack	C	1–3
Airwaves Yamaha	Yamaha YZF-R1	2	(England) Leon Camier		1–12
Airwaves Yamaha	Yamaha YZF-R1	7	(England) James Ellison		1–12
Hydrex Honda	Honda CBR1000RR	3	(Scotland) Stuart Easton		1–12
Hydrex Honda	Honda CBR1000RR	5	(England) Karl Harris		1–9
Hydrex Honda	Honda CBR1000RR	33	(England) Tommy Hill		10–12
Buildbase Kawasaki	Kawasaki Ninja ZX-10R	4	(Northern Ireland) John Laverty		1–12
Buildbase Kawasaki	Kawasaki Ninja ZX-10R	6	(England) Tristan Palmer		1–11
Buildbase Kawasaki	Kawasaki Ninja ZX-10R	6	(England) James Hillier		12
Motorpoint / Henderson Yamaha	Yamaha YZF-R1	8	(England) Graeme Gowland		1–12
Motorpoint / Henderson Yamaha	Yamaha YZF-R1	9	(England) Chris Walker		1–12
Bathams Ducati	Ducati 1098	10	(England) Michael Rutter		11–12
Jentin Yamaha	Yamaha YZF-R1	10	(England) Jon Kirkham		1–3
Jentin Yamaha	Yamaha YZF-R1	10	(England) Chris Burns		8
Jentin Yamaha	Yamaha YZF-R1	75	(England) Craig Fitzpatrick		9
Jentin Yamaha	Yamaha YZF-R1	12	(Australia) David Johnson		11
Relentless Suzuki	Suzuki GSX-R1000	11	(Northern Ireland) Ian Lowry		1–12
Relentless Suzuki	Suzuki GSX-R1000	76	(Japan) Atsushi Watanabe		1–11
Relentless Suzuki	Suzuki GSX-R1000	34	(Northern Ireland) Alastair Seeley	E	11
Relentless Suzuki	Suzuki GSX-R1000	34	(Northern Ireland) Alastair Seeley		12
HM Plant Honda	Honda CBR1000RR	12	(England) John McGuinness		9
HM Plant Honda	Honda CBR1000RR	19	(England) Steve Brogan		7–8
HM Plant Honda	Honda CBR1000RR	23	(Japan) Ryuichi Kiyonari		10
HM Plant Honda	Honda CBR1000RR	25	(England) Steve Plater		1
HM Plant Honda	Honda CBR1000RR	25	(Australia) Josh Brookes		2–7, 10–12
HM Plant Honda	Honda CBR1000RR	31	(Australia) Karl Muggeridge		8–9
HM Plant Honda	Honda CBR1000RR	45	(Australia) Glen Richards		1–6, 11–12
STP – JHS Racing	MV Agusta F4 1000	14	(England) Michael Howarth		7–9, 11–12
STP – JHS Racing	MV Agusta F4 1000	28	(England) Victor Cox	C	2
STP – JHS Racing	MV Agusta F4 1000	28	(England) Victor Cox		5
STP – JHS Racing	Honda CBR1000RR	28	(England) Victor Cox		3–4
MSS Colchester Kawasaki	Kawasaki Ninja ZX-10R	17	(England) Simon Andrews		1–7, 9–12
MSS Colchester Kawasaki	Kawasaki Ninja ZX-10R	17	(England) Michael Rutter		8
MSS Colchester Kawasaki	Kawasaki Ninja ZX-10R	86	(France) Julien Da Costa		1–12
MIST Suzuki	Suzuki GSX-R1000	18	(England) Matt Bond	C	1–5
MIST Suzuki	Suzuki GSX-R1000	18	(England) Steve Mercer	C	8
Hardinge Doodson Honda	Honda CBR1000RR	21	(England) Tom Tunstall	C	1–12
SMT Honda	Honda CBR1000RR	22	(Australia) Jason O'Halloran		1–6
SMT Honda	Honda CBR1000RR	22	(England) Michael Rutter		7
SMT Honda	Honda CBR1000RR	5	(England) Karl Harris		11–12
Kawasaki World Superbike Racing Team	Kawasaki Ninja ZX-10R	23	(Australia) Broc Parkes		8
Kawasaki World Superbike Racing Team	Kawasaki Ninja ZX-10R	100	(South Africa) Sheridan Morais		8
Wilcock Consulting Honda	Honda CBR1000RR	27	(Scotland) Daniel Stewart	C	2
JX Fuelcard Kawasaki	Kawasaki Ninja ZX-10R	32	(England) Kenny Gilbertson	C	1–9
JX Fuelcard Kawasaki	Kawasaki Ninja ZX-10R	99	(Northern Ireland) David Haire	C	11–12
Worx Crescent Suzuki	Suzuki GSX-R1000	33	(England) Tommy Hill		7–8
Worx Crescent Suzuki	Suzuki GSX-R1000	34	(England) Michael Rutter		4–6
Worx Crescent Suzuki	Suzuki GSX-R1000	50	(France) Sylvain Guintoli		1–3, 9–12
Riders Racing Honda	Honda CBR1000RR	40	(England) Martin Jessopp	C	1–5, 7–12
Node 4 Yamaha	Yamaha YZF-R1	44	(England) Jon Kirkham		9
Node 4 Yamaha	Yamaha YZF-R1	44	(England) Karl Harris		10
Node 4 Yamaha	Yamaha YZF-R1	44	(England) Dan Linfoot		11–12
Red Viper Honda	Honda CBR1000RR	44	(England) Alastair Fagan	C	1–6
Red Viper Honda	Honda CBR1000RR	64	(England) Aaron Zanotti		1–9, 11–12
NB Suzuki	Suzuki GSX-R1000	46	(England) Tommy Bridewell	C	5–12
Ultimate Racing Yamaha	Yamaha YZF-R1	60	(England) Peter Hickman	C	1–12
Team Maxxis Branson Yamaha	Yamaha YZF-R1	68	(Australia) David Johnson		1–4, 6–8
Team Maxxis Branson Yamaha	Yamaha YZF-R1	68	(England) Howie Mainwaring		9–12
DHR Racing Honda	Honda CBR1000RR	99	(Northern Ireland) David Haire	C	6
Quay Garage Honda	Honda CBR1000RR	101	(England) Gary Mason	C	1–11
Quay Garage Honda	Honda CBR1000RR	56	(England) James Buckingham	C	12
Team Co-ordit Yamaha	Yamaha YZF-R1	118	(England) Richard Cooper	C	7, 11
North West 200 Yamaha	Yamaha YZF-R1	200	(England) Michael Rutter		1–2
North West 200 Yamaha	Yamaha YZF-R1	200	(England) Jon Kirkham		5–6

Icon	Class
C	Privateers Cup
E	Evolution Class

Key
Regular Rider
Wildcard Rider
Replacement Rider

== Season standings ==
Points system
Position	1st	2nd	3rd	4th	5th	6th	7th	8th	9th	10th	11th	12th	13th	14th	15th
Race	25	20	16	13	11	10	9	8	7	6	5	4	3	2	1

=== Riders Standings ===
2009 Final Riders Standings
Pos	Rider	Bike	BHI (England)		OUL (England)		DON (England)		THR (England)		SNE (England)		KNO (Scotland)		MAL (England)		BHGP (England)			CAD (England)		CRO (England)		SIL (England)		OUL (England)			Pts
Pos	Rider	Bike	R1	R2	R1	R2	R1	R2	R1	R2	R1	R2	R1	R2	R1	R2	R1	R2	R3	R1	R2	R1	R2	R1	R2	R1	R2	R3	Pts
1	(England) Leon Camier	Yamaha	4	1	1	1	1	12	1	1	1	1	1	1	2	1	1	1	1	1	DSQ	6	1	1	2	2	1	1	549.5
2	(England) James Ellison	Yamaha	5	7	5	4	2	1	2	2	4	2	5	3	1	2	6	5	3	3	1	2	4	2	1	4	3	12	413
3	(Scotland) Stuart Easton	Honda	3	4	4	Ret	3	2	3	4	2	4	2	4	Ret	Ret	3	3	4	2	2	1	2	4	4	1	2	Ret	374
4	(Australia) Josh Brookes	Honda			10	Ret	DNS	Ret	7	3	3	3	3	2	Ret	DNS	EX	EX	EX	EX	EX	3	3	3	3	NC	7	3	188
5	(Northern Ireland) Ian Lowry	Suzuki	13	19	7	6	8	6	19	8	5	7	6	Ret	8	Ret	12	12	9	4	Ret	5	7	8	9	8	Ret	4	170
6	(England) Simon Andrews	Kawasaki	7	11	Ret	8	Ret	4	4	6	10	11	4	6	Ret	15				5	3	Ret	5	9	7	6	9	Ret	163.5
7	(France) Julien Da Costa	Kawasaki	11	10	12	Ret	7	11	10	10	9	6	Ret	8	5	10	10	11	Ret	6	4	9	9	10	6	7	Ret	6	160
8	(France) Sylvain Guintoli	Suzuki	1	2	3	3	DNS													8	7	Ret	13	7	8	5	5	5	147
9	(England) Chris Walker	Yamaha	14	8	11	9	5	3	Ret	Ret	6	17	7	5	Ret	3	9	Ret	12	11	6	Ret	11	Ret	11	9	14	7	141
10	(Northern Ireland) John Laverty	Kawasaki	12	13	Ret	DNS	9	9	8	11	13	5	Ret	Ret	Ret	4	7	13	5	9	5	13	10	6	Ret	10	6	Ret	130.5
11	(England) Tommy Hill	Suzuki													Ret	8	5	4	7										127
11	(England) Tommy Hill	Honda																				7	6	5	5	3	4	2	127
12	(Australia) Glen Richards	Honda	2	5	6	5	4	5	6	7	Ret	8												13	DNS	11	10	8	125
13	(England) Gary Mason	Honda	6	9	9	7	12	7	9	12	Ret	14	Ret	10	6	18	13	14	15	10	9	8	8	14	Ret	13	12	10	125
14	(England) Karl Harris	Honda	Ret	6	2	2	6	18	11	9	8	9	Ret	Ret	Ret	7	8	6	14	15	8			Ret	14	Ret	DNS	DNS	124.5
14	(England) Karl Harris	Yamaha																				14	16						124.5
15	(England) Graeme Gowland	Yamaha	9	15			10	10	12	13	11	12	8	7	3	13	Ret	9	13	19	DNS	10	12	11	Ret	Ret	15	11	101.5
16	(England) Michael Rutter	Yamaha	16	17	17	Ret																							66
16	(England) Michael Rutter	Suzuki							5	5	7	Ret	11	Ret															66
16	(England) Michael Rutter	Honda													4	6													66
16	(England) Michael Rutter	Kawasaki															11	Ret	10										66
16	(England) Michael Rutter	Ducati																						Ret	15	12	8	Ret	66
17	(Australia) Broc Parkes	Kawasaki															2	2	2										60
18	(England) Tommy Bridewell	Suzuki									15	20	9	9	11	DNS	Ret	Ret	DNS	13	10	12	14	12	12	15	11	9	56
19	(Australia) Jason O'Halloran	Honda	8	12	8	10	11	Ret	13	17	12	10	10	12															54
20	(Australia) Karl Muggeridge	Honda															4	7	6	7	13								44
21	(England) Tristan Palmer	Kawasaki	10	14	15	Ret	Ret	8			16	19	Ret	11	10	12	15	18	16	18	12	Ret	Ret	Ret	DNS				35
22	(England) Peter Hickman	Yamaha	21	23	18	15	16	14	16	15	17	15	12	14	12	14	Ret	20	20	14	11	11	15	15	13	14	Ret	DNS	35
23	(England) Steve Brogan	Honda													7	9	14	8	11										27.5
24	(England) Jon Kirkham	Yamaha	15	16	13	11	13	13			14	13								16	15								21
25	(England) Steve Plater	Honda	Ret	3																									16
26	(Australia) David Johnson	Yamaha	19	20	Ret	14	Ret	Ret	18	Ret			Ret	13	9	11	19	Ret	DNS					Ret	DNS				14.5
27	(Japan) Atsushi Watanabe	Suzuki	17	21	14	12	19	Ret	14	Ret	18	16	14	15	14	19	17	15	19	20	16	18	21	19	Ret				14
28	(South Africa) Sheridan Morais	Kawasaki															Ret	10	8										14
29	(Japan) Ryuichi Kiyonari	Honda																				4	18						13
30	(England) Tom Tunstall	Honda	Ret	DNS	19	16	14	17	15	16	DNS	18	13	16	13	17	18	19	18	Ret	17	16	19	17	16	16	16	13	12
32	(Northern Ireland) Alastair Seeley	Suzuki																						Ret	10	Ret	13	Ret	9
31	(England) Martin Jessopp	Honda	18	18	16	13	15	15	17	14	DNS	DNS			16	22	16	16	17	21	18	17	20	20	17	17	20	16	7
32	(England) Richard Cooper	Yamaha													Ret	5								16	Ret				5.5
32	(England) Howie Mainwaring	Yamaha																		17	14	15	17	Ret	Ret	18	18	14	5
33	(England) John McGuinness	Honda																		12	Ret								4
34	(England) Kenny Gilbertson	Kawasaki	24	24	20	DNS	Ret	Ret	25	Ret	21	Ret	Ret	17	15	16	DNS	Ret	DNS	Ret	DNS								1
35	(England) Aaron Zanotti	Honda	20	22	Ret	17	18	Ret	22	20	Ret	DNS	15	19			Ret	Ret	21	DNS	DNS			Ret	18	20	Ret	17	1
36	(England) Dan Linfoot	Yamaha																						18	Ret	19	17	15	1
	(England) Victor Cox	MV Agusta			Ret	Ret					20	22																	0
	(England) Victor Cox	Honda					17	16	21	19																			0
	(Northern Ireland) David Haire	Honda											16	18										Ret	Ret				0
	(England) Chris Burns	Yamaha															Ret	17	Ret										0
	(England) Alastair Fagan	Honda	22	Ret	Ret	18	22	20	23	18	Ret	23																	0
	(England) Matt Bond	Suzuki	Ret	DNS	Ret	Ret	20	19	24	21	19	21																	0
	(England) Malcolm Ashley	Kawasaki					DNS	DNS	20	Ret																			0
	(Republic of Ireland) Brian McCormack	Kawasaki	23	Ret	22	Ret	21	Ret																					0
	(Scotland) Daniel Stewart	Honda			21	Ret																							0
	(England) Craig Fitzpatrick	Yamaha																		22	Ret								0
	(England) Michael Howarth	MV Agusta													Ret	Ret	Ret	Ret	Ret	Ret	Ret			21	19	21	Ret	Ret	0
	(England) Steve Mercer	Suzuki															Ret	DNS	DNS										0
	(England) James Hiller	Kawasaki																								Ret	19	Ret	0
Pos	Rider	Bike	BHI (England)		OUL (England)		DON (England)		THR (England)		SNE (England)		KNO (Scotland)		MAL (England)		BHGP (England)			CAD (England)		CRO (England)		SIL (England)		OUL (England)			Pts

Colour	Result
Gold	Winner
Silver	Second place
Bronze	Third place
Green	Points classification
Blue	Non-points classification
Blue	Non-classified finish (NC)
Purple	Retired, not classified (Ret)
Red	Did not qualify (DNQ)
Red	Did not pre-qualify (DNPQ)
Black	Disqualified (DSQ)
White	Did not start (DNS)
White	Withdrew (WD)
White	Race cancelled (C)
Blank	Did not practice (DNP)
Blank	Did not arrive (DNA)
Blank	Excluded (EX)

=== Privateers Standings ===
2009 Final Privateers Standings
Pos	Rider	Bike	BHI (England)		OUL (England)		DON (England)		THR (England)		SNE (England)		KNO (Scotland)		MAL (England)		BHGP (England)			CAD (England)		CRO (England)		SIL (England)		OUL (England)			Pts
Pos	Rider	Bike	R1	R2	R1	R2	R1	R2	R1	R2	R1	R2	R1	R2	R1	R2	R1	R2	R3	R1	R2	R1	R2	R1	R2	R1	R2	R3	Pts
1	(England) Gary Mason	Honda	6	9	9	7	12	7	9	12	Ret	14	Ret	10	6	18	13	14	15	10	9	8	8	14	Ret	13	12	10	535.5
2	(England) Peter Hickman	Yamaha	21	23	18	15	16	14	16	15	17	15	12	14	12	14	Ret	20	20	14	11	11	15	15	13	14	Ret	DNS	381
3	(England) Martin Jessopp	Honda	18	18	16	13	15	15	17	14	DNS	DNS			16	22	16	16	17	21	18	17	20	20	17	17	20	16	326
4	(England) Tom Tunstall	Honda	Ret	DNS	19	16	14	17	15	16	DNS	18	13	16	13	17	18	19	18	Ret	17	16	19	17	16	16	16	13	315.5
5	(England) Tommy Bridewell	Suzuki									15	20	9	9	11	DNS	Ret	Ret	DNS	13	10	12	14	12	12	15	11	9	300
6	(England) Kenny Gilbertson	Kawasaki	24	24	20	DNS	Ret	Ret	25	Ret	21	Ret	Ret	17	15	16	DNS	Ret	DNS	Ret	DNS								85
7	(England) Alastair Fagan	Honda	22	Ret	Ret	18	22	20	23	18	Ret	23	Inj	Inj	Inj	Inj	Inj	Inj	Inj										74
8	(England) Matt Bond	Suzuki	Ret	DNS	Ret	Ret	20	19	24	21	19	21																	68
9	(Republic of Ireland) Brian McCormack	Kawasaki	23	Ret	22	Ret	21	Ret																					30
10	(England) Richard Cooper	Yamaha													Ret	5								16	Ret				25.5
11	(Northern Ireland) David Haire	Honda											16	18															23
12	(England) Malcolm Ashley	Kawasaki					DNS	DNS	20	Ret																			11
13	(Scotland) Daniel Stewart	Honda			21	Ret																							10
	(England) Victor Cox	MV Agusta			Ret	Ret																							0
	(England) Steve Mercer	Suzuki															Ret	DNS	DNS										0
Pos	Rider	Bike	BHI (England)		OUL (England)		DON (England)		THR (England)		SNE (England)		KNO (Scotland)		MAL (England)		BHGP (England)			CAD (England)		CRO (England)		SIL (England)		OUL (England)			Pts

Colour	Result
Gold	Winner
Silver	Second place
Bronze	Third place
Green	Points classification
Blue	Non-points classification
Blue	Non-classified finish (NC)
Purple	Retired, not classified (Ret)
Red	Did not qualify (DNQ)
Red	Did not pre-qualify (DNPQ)
Black	Disqualified (DSQ)
White	Did not start (DNS)
White	Withdrew (WD)
White	Race cancelled (C)
Blank	Did not practice (DNP)
Blank	Did not arrive (DNA)
Blank	Excluded (EX)

=== Manufacturers' Standings ===
2009 Final Manufacturers' Standings
Pos	Manufacturer	BHI (England)		OUL (England)		DON (England)		THR (England)		SNE (England)		KNO (Scotland)		MAL (England)		BHGP (England)			CAD (England)		CRO (England)		SIL (England)		OUL (England)			Pts
Pos	Manufacturer	R1	R2	R1	R2	R1	R2	R1	R2	R1	R2	R1	R2	R1	R2	R1	R2	R3	R1	R2	R1	R2	R1	R2	R1	R2	R3	Pts
1	(Japan) Yamaha	4	1	1	1	1	1	1	1	1	1	1	1	1	1	1	1	1	1	1	2	1	1	1	2	1	1	615.5
2	(Japan) Honda	2	3	2	2	3	2	3	3	2	3	2	2	4	6	3	3	4	2	2	1	2	3	3	1	2	2	323
3	(Japan) Suzuki	1	2	3	3	8	6	5	5	5	7	6	9	8	8	5	4	7	4	7	5	7	7	8	7	7	4	293
4	(Japan) Kawasaki	7	10	12	8	7	4	4	6	9	5	4	6	5	4	2	2	2	5	3	9							217.5
5	(Italy) MV Agusta			Ret	Ret					20	22			Ret	Ret	Ret	Ret	Ret	Ret	Ret								0
