= Josh Waters =

Australian motorcycle racer

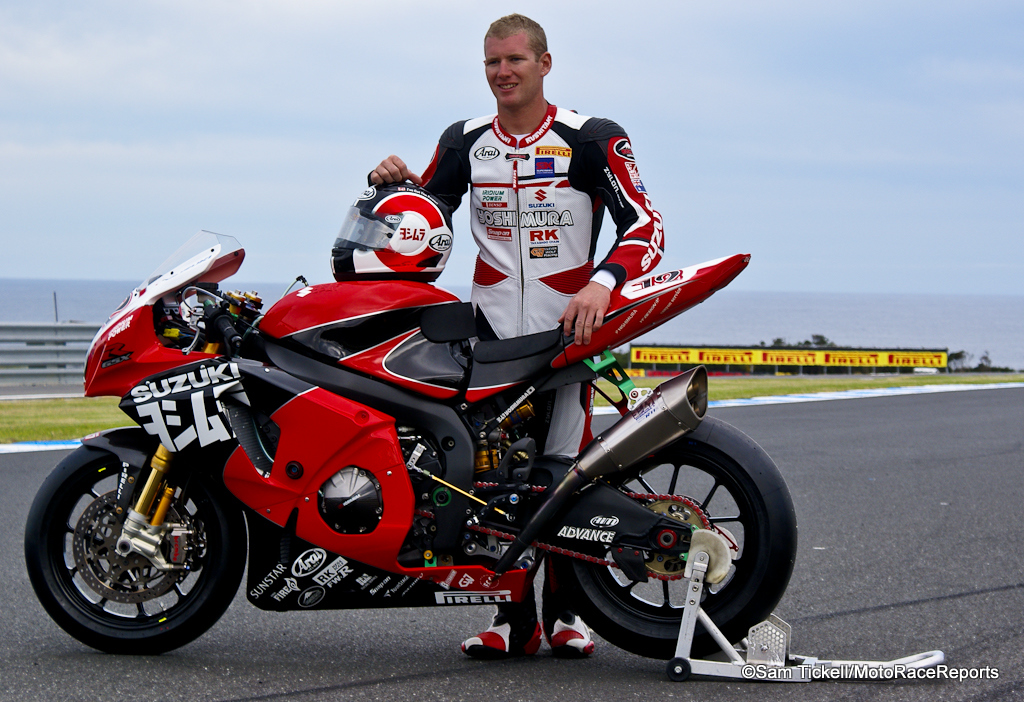
- Waters in 2010
- Nationality: Australian
- Born: 24 January 1987 (age 39); Mildura, Australia
- Current team: McMartin Racing
- Bike number: 1
- Website: joshuawaters.com.au
Motorcycle racing career statistics
250cc World Championship
| Active years | 2004 |
| Manufacturers | Honda |
Starts / Wins / Podiums / Poles / F. laps / Points; 1 / 0 / 0 / 0 / 0 / 0
125cc World Championship
| Active years | 2002–2003 |
| Manufacturers | Kawasaki |
Starts / Wins / Podiums / Poles / F. laps / Points; 3 / 0 / 0 / 0 / 0 / 0
Superbike World Championship
| Active years | 2011 |
| Manufacturers | Suzuki |
Starts / Wins / Podiums / Poles / F. laps / Points; 6 / 0 / 0 / 0 / 0 / 8

Joshua Waters (born 24 January 1987) is an Australian motorcycle racer. He currently competes in the Australian Superbike Championship. He is a three-time Australian Superbike champion having won the 2009, 2012 for Team Suzuki Australia, and then in 2017, won his third championship for Team Suzuki ECSTAR finishing four points ahead Wayne Maxwell who was then racing for the Yamaha Racing. He has also competed in the Australian 125GP Championship (where he was champion in 2003), the Australian Supersport Championship, the British Superbike Championship and the Superbike World Championship.

His cousin is Supercars Championship racing driver Cam Waters.

== Career ==
Having started racing at the age of five, Waters had already won his first national championship by the age of six and begun his road racing career by the age 2000. Other accolades include coming 3rd at the Macau 125GP (2003), wildcard entry into the Phillip Island round of World 125GP Championship (2003), wildcard entry into the Phillip Island round of World 250GP Championship (2004), 1st - Philip Island 8 hour Endurance with Team Suzuki Australia (2011). Waters has also ridden for the Yoshimura Racing Team where he finished second in the 2011 Suzuka 8 Hours aboard a Suzuki GSX-R1000 and represented them in three rounds of the Superbike World Championship.

In 2013, Waters moved across to the British Superbike Championship and initially raced for the Milwaukee Yamaha race team but was replaced by Tommy Bridewell for the final few rounds of the season. After having piloted a BMW S1000RR at the Le-Mans 24-hour race he joined the Halsall Race Team for the final two rounds of the British Superbike Championship aboard a Kawasaki ZX-10R. Waters ended the season in 13th position overall.

Following the 2013 British Superbike Championship, Waters signed on with Tyco Suzuki and rode a Suzuki GSX-R1000 for the 2014 season. At Brands Hatch, in the fifth round of the season, he won his first race in the championship.

== Career statistics ==
=== Grand Prix motorcycle racing ===
==== By season ====
| Season | Class | Motorcycle | Team | Race | Win | Podium | Pole | FLap | Pts | Plcd |
|---|---|---|---|---|---|---|---|---|---|---|
| 2002 | 125cc | Honda | FCC - TSR | 2 | 0 | 0 | 0 | 0 | 0 | NC |
| 2003 | 125cc | Honda | Grand Prix Training Centre | 1 | 0 | 0 | 0 | 0 | 0 | NC |
| 2004 | 250cc | Honda | Castrol-Honda Kiefer Racing | 1 | 0 | 0 | 0 | 0 | 0 | NC |
| Total | | | | **4** | **0** | **0** | **0** | **0** | **0** | |

==== Races by year ====
(key)

| Year | Class | Bike | 1 | 2 | 3 | 4 | 5 | 6 | 7 | 8 | 9 | 10 | 11 | 12 | 13 | 14 | 15 | 16 | Pos. | Pts |
|---|---|---|---|---|---|---|---|---|---|---|---|---|---|---|---|---|---|---|---|---|
| 2002 | 125cc | Honda | JPN | RSA | SPA | FRA | ITA | CAT | NED | GBR | GER | CZE | POR | BRA | PAC | MAL; Ret | AUS; 25 | VAL | NC | 0 |
| 2003 | 125cc | Honda | JPN | RSA | SPA | FRA | ITA | CAT | NED | GBR | GER | CZE | POR | BRA | PAC | MAL | AUS; Ret | VAL | NC | 0 |
| 2004 | 250cc | Honda | RSA | SPA | FRA | ITA | CAT | NED | BRA | GER | GBR | CZE | POR | JPN | QAT | MAL | AUS; 18 | VAL | NC | 0 |

=== MotoAmerica SuperBike Championship ===
| Year | Class | Team | 1 | | 2 | | 3 | | 4 | | 5 | | 6 | | 7 | 8 | | 9 | | 10 | | Pos | Pts |
| Year | Class | Team | R1 | R2 | R1 | R2 | R1 | R2 | R1 | R2 | R1 | R2 | R1 | R2 | R1 | R1 | R2 | R1 | R2 | R1 | R2 | Pos | Pts |
|---|---|---|---|---|---|---|---|---|---|---|---|---|---|---|---|---|---|---|---|---|---|---|---|
| 2010 | SuperBike | Suzuki | DAY | DAY | FON | FON | RAT | RAT | INF | INF | RAM | RAM | MOH | MOH | LAG; DNS | VIR | VIR | NJE | NJE | BAR | BAR | NC | 0 |

=== Superbike World Championship ===
==== Races by year ====
| Year | Make | 1 | | 2 | | 3 | | 4 | | 5 | | 6 | | 7 | | 8 | | 9 | | 10 | | 11 | | 12 | | 13 | | Pos. | Pts |
| Year | Make | R1 | R2 | R1 | R2 | R1 | R2 | R1 | R2 | R1 | R2 | R1 | R2 | R1 | R2 | R1 | R2 | R1 | R2 | R1 | R2 | R1 | R2 | R1 | R2 | R1 | R2 | Pos. | Pts |
|---|---|---|---|---|---|---|---|---|---|---|---|---|---|---|---|---|---|---|---|---|---|---|---|---|---|---|---|---|---|
| 2011 | Suzuki | AUS; 18 | AUS; 13 | EUR | EUR | NED | NED | ITA | ITA | USA; 12 | USA; 15 | SMR | SMR | SPA | SPA | CZE | CZE | GBR | GBR | GER | GER | ITA | ITA | FRA | FRA | POR; 21 | POR; 18 | 25th | 8 |

=== British Superbike Championship ===
==== Races by year ====
(key) (Races in bold indicate pole position, races in italics indicate fastest lap)

| Year | Make | 1 | | | 2 | | | 3 | | | 4 | | | 5 | | | 6 | | | 7 | | | 8 | | | 9 | | | 10 | | | 11 | | | 12 | | | Pos | Pts |
| Year | Make | R1 | R2 | R3 | R1 | R2 | R3 | R1 | R2 | R3 | R1 | R2 | R3 | R1 | R2 | R3 | R1 | R2 | R3 | R1 | R2 | R3 | R1 | R2 | R3 | R1 | R2 | R3 | R1 | R2 | R3 | R1 | R2 | R3 | R1 | R2 | R3 | Pos | Pts |
|---|---|---|---|---|---|---|---|---|---|---|---|---|---|---|---|---|---|---|---|---|---|---|---|---|---|---|---|---|---|---|---|---|---|---|---|---|---|---|---|
| 2013 | Yamaha/Kawasaki | BHI; 10 | BHI; 14 | | THR; Ret | THR; 16 | | OUL; 13 | OUL; 10 | | KNO; 19 | KNO; Ret | | SNE; 9 | SNE; 7 | | BHGP; 14 | BHGP; 12 | | OUL; 14 | OUL; 11 | OUL; 15 | CAD; 12 | CAD; 8 | | DON; 12 | DON; 12 | | ASS | ASS | | SIL | SIL | | BHGP | BHGP | BHGP | 13th | 96 |
| 2014 | Suzuki | BHI; 15 | BHI; 16 | | OUL; 13 | OUL; 13 | | SNE; 10 | SNE; 10 | | KNO; Ret | KNO; 16 | | BHGP; 14 | BHGP; 1 | | THR; 17 | THR; 12 | | OUL; 8 | OUL; 9 | OUL; 6 | CAD; 5 | CAD; 5 | | DON; 6 | **DON**; 5 | | ASS; 1 | ASS; 8 | | SIL; 7 | SIL; 5 | | BHGP; 2 | **BHGP**; 16 | BHGP; 15 | 9th | 192 |

| Year | Make | 1 | | 2 | | 3 | | | 4 | | 5 | | 6 | | | 7 | | 8 | | | 9 | | | 10 | | 11 | | 12 | | | Pos | Pts |
| Year | Make | R1 | R2 | R1 | R2 | R1 | R2 | R3 | R1 | R2 | R1 | R2 | R1 | R2 | R3 | R1 | R2 | R1 | R2 | R3 | R1 | R2 | R3 | R1 | R2 | R1 | R2 | R1 | R2 | R3 | Pos | Pts |
|---|---|---|---|---|---|---|---|---|---|---|---|---|---|---|---|---|---|---|---|---|---|---|---|---|---|---|---|---|---|---|---|---|
| 2015 | Suzuki | DON; 18 | DON; 15 | BHI; 15 | BHI; 16 | OUL; 12 | OUL; 12 | | SNE; 14 | SNE; 18 | KNO; Ret | KNO; 15 | BHGP; 17 | BHGP; 19 | | THR; 14 | THR; 10 | CAD; 17 | CAD; 17 | | OUL; 14 | OUL; 15 | OUL; 19 | ASS; 15 | ASS; 14 | SIL; 15 | SIL; 18 | BHGP; 19 | BHGP; 16 | BHGP; Ret | 25th | 28 |

=== Australian Superbike Championship ===
==== Races by year ====
(key) (Races in bold indicate pole position; races in italics indicate fastest lap)

| Year | Bike | 1 | | 2 | | 3 | | 4 | | | 5 | | 6 | | | 7 | | Pos | Pts |
| Year | Bike | R1 | R2 | R1 | R2 | R1 | R2 | R1 | R2 | R3 | R1 | R2 | R1 | R2 | R3 | R1 | R2 | Pos | Pts |
|---|---|---|---|---|---|---|---|---|---|---|---|---|---|---|---|---|---|---|---|
| 2022 | BMW/Ducati | PHI; 4 | PHI; 5 | QUE; 3 | QUE; 5 | WAK; 8 | WAK; 7 | HID; 8 | HID; 6 | HID; 7 | MOR | MOR | PHI; 3**^{1}** | PHI; 2 | PHI; 1 | BEN; 4 | BEN; Ret | 7th | 217 |

=== FIM Endurance World Championship ===
==== By team ====
| Year | Team | Bike | Rider | TC |
|---|---|---|---|---|
| 2013 | Yamaha Austria Racing Team | Yamaha YZF-R1 | (Australia) Broc Parkes (Slovenia) Igor Jerman (South Africa) Sheridan Morais (Australia) Josh Waters (Japan) Katsuyuki Nakasuga (United States) Josh Hayes | 5th |

==== Suzuka 8 Hours results ====
| Year | Team | Riders | Bike | Pos |
|---|---|---|---|---|
| 2024 | (Italy) Ducati Team KAGAYAMA | (Japan) Ryo Mizuno (Malaysia) Hafizh Syahrin | Ducati Panigale V4R | **4th** |
