= 2014 British Superbike Championship =

British motorcycle racing season

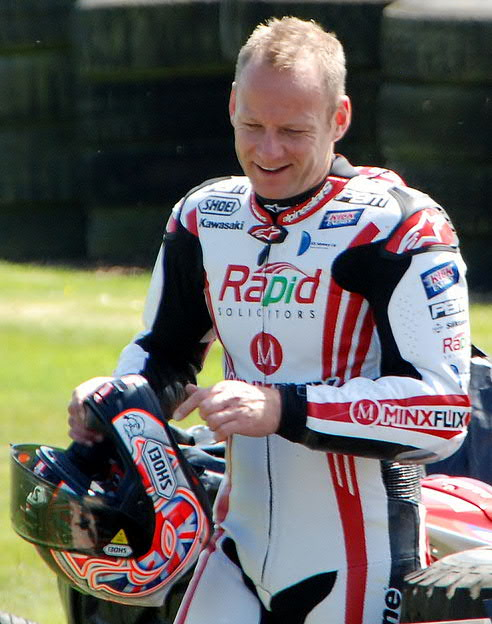
2014 champion, Shane Byrne

The 2014 British Superbike Championship season was the 27th British Superbike Championship season. Shane Byrne took the championship, riding a Kawasaki for Paul Bird Motorsport. Byrne's fourth title – after previous triumphs in 2003, 2008 and 2012 – saw him set a new record for the series. He scored 11 victories during the season, and was able to win the championship by 62 points ahead of Ryuichi Kiyonari, a three-time series champion. Kiyonari had trailed by 12 points going into the final round of the season at Brands Hatch, but Kiyonari crashed out of contention during a free practice session, and fractured a collarbone in the process. Kiyonari won seven races during the season for the Buildbase sponsored BMW team from Hawk Racing. Third place in the championship was decided in the final race between Milwaukee Yamaha team-mates; a third-place finish for Tommy Bridewell, compared to a fifth place for Josh Brookes, allowed Bridewell to take the position by three points. Brookes took four race victories to his team-mate's single victory at Cadwell Park, which was his first in British Superbikes.

Outside of the Showdown, Stuart Easton was the winner of the BSB Riders' Cup, finishing in seventh place in the overall championship standings. Although only recording two podium finishes during the season, consistent finishing allowed Easton to remain in front of the chasing pack, most notably GBmoto's James Ellison. Ellison started the season with six successive podium finishes and had been in contention to make the Showdown, but he was forced to miss several rounds after a crash at the second Brands Hatch meeting which resulted in a broken femur. The only other riders to win races during the season were three more first-time winners in the series; Tyco Suzuki rider Josh Waters won at the second Brands Hatch meeting, Peter Hickman won at Cadwell Park for the RAF Reserves team – having replaced Simon Andrews in the team, after his death at the North West 200 road race in May – and Quattro Plant Kawasaki's Howie Mainwaring won the opening race of the final Brands Hatch meeting.

Kawasaki won the manufacturers' championship, 124 points clear of Yamaha. Byrne, Kiyonari and Brookes all scored seven points towards the Speedy Fastest Lap League, with all three riders each setting a lap record at some point during the 2014 campaign.

To increase the emphasis of a main season win, the playoff bonus points was changed to five points for a win (up from three), three points for second (up from two), and one point for third.

== Race calendar and results ==
2014 Calendar
Main Season
Round		Circuit	Date	Pole position	Fastest lap	Winning rider	Winning team
1	R1	(England) Brands Hatch Indy	21 April	(Australia) Josh Brookes	(England) James Ellison	(England) Shane Byrne	Rapid Solicitors Kawasaki
1	R2	(England) Brands Hatch Indy	21 April		(England) James Ellison	(England) Shane Byrne	Rapid Solicitors Kawasaki
2	R1	(England) Oulton Park	5 May	(England) Shane Byrne	(Australia) Josh Brookes	(England) Shane Byrne	Rapid Solicitors Kawasaki
2	R2	(England) Oulton Park	5 May		(Australia) Josh Brookes	(Australia) Josh Brookes	Milwaukee Yamaha
3	R1	(England) Snetterton 300	15 June	(England) Shane Byrne	(England) Shane Byrne	(England) Shane Byrne	Rapid Solicitors Kawasaki
3	R2	(England) Snetterton 300	15 June		(Australia) Josh Brookes	(England) Shane Byrne	Rapid Solicitors Kawasaki
4	R1	(Scotland) Knockhill	29 June	(Japan) Ryuichi Kiyonari	(England) Shane Byrne	(Japan) Ryuichi Kiyonari	Buildbase BMW
4	R2	(Scotland) Knockhill	29 June		(Japan) Ryuichi Kiyonari	(England) Shane Byrne	Rapid Solicitors Kawasaki
5	R1	(England) Brands Hatch GP	20 July	(England) Shane Byrne	(England) Shane Byrne	(Japan) Ryuichi Kiyonari	Buildbase BMW
5	R2	(England) Brands Hatch GP	20 July		(Northern Ireland) Keith Farmer	(Australia) Josh Waters	Tyco Suzuki
6	R1	(England) Thruxton	3 August	(Czech Republic) Jakub Smrž	(England) Dan Linfoot	(Australia) Josh Brookes	Milwaukee Yamaha
6	R2	(England) Thruxton	3 August		(Japan) Ryuichi Kiyonari	(Australia) Josh Brookes	Milwaukee Yamaha
7	R1	(England) Oulton Park	9 August	(England) Shane Byrne	(Australia) Josh Brookes	(Japan) Ryuichi Kiyonari	Buildbase BMW
7	R2	(England) Oulton Park	10 August		(England) Shane Byrne	(Japan) Ryuichi Kiyonari	Buildbase BMW
7	R3	(England) Oulton Park	10 August		(Japan) Ryuichi Kiyonari	(Australia) Josh Brookes	Milwaukee Yamaha
8	R1	(England) Cadwell Park	25 August	(England) Shane Byrne	(Japan) Ryuichi Kiyonari	(England) Tommy Bridewell	Milwaukee Yamaha
8	R2	(England) Cadwell Park	25 August		(England) Shane Byrne	(England) Peter Hickman	RAF Reserves Honda
9	R1	(England) Donington Park	7 September	(United States) John Hopkins	(Australia) Josh Waters	(Japan) Ryuichi Kiyonari	Buildbase BMW
9	R2	(England) Donington Park	7 September		(Japan) Ryuichi Kiyonari	(Japan) Ryuichi Kiyonari	Buildbase BMW
The Showdown
10	R1	(Netherlands) TT Circuit Assen	21 September	(England) Christian Iddon	(England) Jon Kirkham	(Australia) Josh Waters	Tyco Suzuki
10	R2	(Netherlands) TT Circuit Assen	21 September		(England) Dan Linfoot	(England) Shane Byrne	Rapid Solicitors Kawasaki
11	R1	(England) Silverstone Arena GP	5 October	(Japan) Ryuichi Kiyonari	(England) Shane Byrne	(England) Shane Byrne	Rapid Solicitors Kawasaki
11	R2	(England) Silverstone Arena GP	5 October		(Japan) Ryuichi Kiyonari	(Japan) Ryuichi Kiyonari	Buildbase BMW
12	R1	(England) Brands Hatch GP	18 October	(England) James Ellison	(Australia) Josh Waters	(England) Howie Mainwaring	Quattro Plant Kawasaki
12	R2	(England) Brands Hatch GP	19 October		(Australia) Josh Brookes	(England) Shane Byrne	Rapid Solicitors Kawasaki
12	R3	(England) Brands Hatch GP	19 October		(England) Tommy Bridewell	(England) Shane Byrne	Rapid Solicitors Kawasaki

== Entry list ==
2014 Entry List
Team	Constructor	Bike	No.	Riders	Rounds
Bimota Alstare Junior Team	Bimota	Bimota BB3	2	(England) Christian Iddon	10
Bimota Alstare Junior Team	Bimota	Bimota BB3	123	(France) Christophe Ponsson	6–12
Milwaukee Yamaha	Yamaha	Yamaha YZF-R1	3	(Australia) Josh Brookes	All
Milwaukee Yamaha	Yamaha	Yamaha YZF-R1	46	(England) Tommy Bridewell	All
Quattro Plant Kawasaki	Kawasaki	Kawasaki ZX-10R	4	(England) Dan Linfoot	All
Quattro Plant Kawasaki	Kawasaki	Kawasaki ZX-10R	37	(England) James Hillier	1
Quattro Plant Kawasaki	Kawasaki	Kawasaki ZX-10R	43	(England) Howie Mainwaring	3–12
Rapid Solicitors Kawasaki	Kawasaki	Kawasaki ZX-10R	5	(Scotland) Stuart Easton	All
Rapid Solicitors Kawasaki	Kawasaki	Kawasaki ZX-10R	67	(England) Shane Byrne	All
RAF Reserves Honda	Honda	Honda CBR1000RR	6	(England) Simon Andrews	1–2
RAF Reserves Honda	Honda	Honda CBR1000RR	60	(England) Peter Hickman	4–12
Team WD-40 Kawasaki	Kawasaki	Kawasaki ZX-10R	7	(England) Barry Burrell	1–11
Team WD-40 Kawasaki	Kawasaki	Kawasaki ZX-10R	7	(Australia) Bryan Staring	12
FFX Yamaha	Yamaha	Yamaha YZF-R1	8	(England) Ian Hutchinson	1–7
FFX Yamaha	Yamaha	Yamaha YZF-R1	8	(Sweden) Filip Backlund	9–12
Lloyds British GBmoto Kawasaki	Kawasaki	Kawasaki ZX-10R	9	(England) Chris Walker	All
Lloyds British GBmoto Kawasaki	Kawasaki	Kawasaki ZX-10R	77	(England) James Ellison	1–5, 8–12
Halsall Racing Kawasaki	Kawasaki	Kawasaki ZX-10R	10	(England) Jon Kirkham	4–12
Halsall Racing Kawasaki	Kawasaki	Kawasaki ZX-10R	39	(England) Lee Costello	1
Halsall Racing Kawasaki	Kawasaki	Kawasaki ZX-10R	50	(England) Harry Hartley	1–3
Tsingtao WK Kawasaki	Kawasaki	Kawasaki ZX-10R	10	(England) Jon Kirkham	1–2
Tsingtao WK Kawasaki	Kawasaki	Kawasaki ZX-10R	50	(England) Harry Hartley	4
Tsingtao WK Kawasaki	Kawasaki	Kawasaki ZX-10R	60	(England) Peter Hickman	3
Tsingtao WK Kawasaki	Kawasaki	Kawasaki ZX-10R	101	(England) Gary Mason	7–12
Bathams BMW	BMW	BMW S1000RR	11	(England) Michael Rutter	1–9
Bathams BMW	BMW	BMW S1000RR	24	(Switzerland) Patric Muff	All
Tyco Suzuki	Suzuki	Suzuki GSX-R1000	12	(Australia) Josh Waters	All
Tyco Suzuki	Suzuki	Suzuki GSX-R1000	21	(United States) John Hopkins	All
Buildbase BMW	BMW	BMW S1000RR	14	(England) Lee Jackson	5–7, 10
Buildbase BMW	BMW	BMW S1000RR	23	(Japan) Ryuichi Kiyonari	All
Buildbase BMW	BMW	BMW S1000RR	27	(England) James Westmoreland	1–4, 8–12
Buildbase BMW	BMW	BMW S1000RR	33	(Northern Ireland) Michael Dunlop	1
Gearlink Kawasaki	Kawasaki	Kawasaki ZX-10R	15	(England) Ben Wilson	All
Anvil Hire TAG Racing Kawasaki	Kawasaki	Kawasaki ZX-10R	18	(Netherlands) Kevin Valk	10
Anvil Hire TAG Racing Kawasaki	Kawasaki	Kawasaki ZX-10R	35	(Australia) Mitchell Carr	1, 3, 9–10
Anvil Hire TAG Racing Kawasaki	Kawasaki	Kawasaki ZX-10R	35	(England) Shaun Winfield	2, 6, 11–12
Anvil Hire TAG Racing Kawasaki	Kawasaki	Kawasaki ZX-10R	47	(England) Richard Cooper	1–6
Anvil Hire TAG Racing Kawasaki	Kawasaki	Kawasaki ZX-10R	75	(Australia) Glen Richards	7–8
Anvil Hire TAG Racing Kawasaki	Kawasaki	Kawasaki ZX-10R	88	(England) Scott Smart	7–8
Anvil Hire TAG Racing Kawasaki	Kawasaki	Kawasaki ZX-10R	101	(England) Gary Mason	5
Two Wheel Racing Honda	Honda	Honda CBR1000RR	20	(England) Jenny Tinmouth	1–7, 11–12
Quelch Afterdark Motorsport	Kawasaki	Kawasaki ZX-10R	26	(England) Josh Wainwright	1
Saudi Falcons	BMW	BMW S1000RR	36	(Saudi Arabia) Abdulaziz Binladin	9
Riders Motorcycles BMW	BMW	BMW S1000RR	40	(England) Martin Jessopp	1–2, 5–12
SBK City Racing Kawasaki	Kawasaki	Kawasaki ZX-10R	45	(Brazil) Rhalf Lo Turco	1–3, 5–12
Refresh Debt Solutions Kawasaki	Kawasaki	Kawasaki ZX-10R	53	(England) Joe Burns	10
Morello Services PBR Kawasaki	Kawasaki	Kawasaki ZX-10R	55	(England) Peter Baker	1–2
Morello Services PBR Kawasaki	Kawasaki	Kawasaki ZX-10R	56	(England) John Ingram	3–12
GGH/STEL Suzuki	Suzuki	Suzuki GSX-R1000	64	(England) Aaron Zanotti	All
PR Racing Kawasaki	Kawasaki	Kawasaki ZX-10R	68	(Australia) Jed Metcher	10–12
PR Racing Kawasaki	Kawasaki	Kawasaki ZX-10R	303	(Northern Ireland) Keith Farmer	1–8
Honda Racing	Honda	Honda CBR1000RR	86	(France) Julien Da Costa	3, 9, 11–12
Millsport Ducati	Ducati	Ducati 1199 Panigale	96	(Czech Republic) Jakub Smrž	1–8
Moto Rapido	Ducati	Ducati 1199 Panigale	96	(Czech Republic) Jakub Smrž	12
MotoDex Performance First	BMW	BMW S1000RR	127	(Denmark) Robbin Harms	11–12

== Championship standings ==
=== Riders' championship ===
Pos	Rider	Bike	BRH (England)		OUL (England)		SNE (England)		KNO (Scotland)		BRH (England)		THR (England)		OUL (England)			CAD (England)		DON (England)		ASS (Netherlands)		SIL (England)		BRH (England)			Pts
Pos	Rider	Bike	R1	R2	R1	R2	R1	R2	R1	R2	R1	R2	R1	R2	R1	R2	R3	R1	R2	R1	R2	R1	R2	R1	R2	R1	R2	R3	Pts
The Championship Showdown
1	(England) Shane Byrne	Kawasaki	1	1	**1**	2	**1**	**1**	2	**1**	**2**	**5**	2	2	**3**	3	**2**	**2**	2	2	2	Ret	1	1	**2**	Ret	1	1	682
2	(Japan) Ryuichi Kiyonari	BMW	16	4	Ret	Ret	5	4	**1**	2	1	Ret	3	3	1	1	4	Ret	**Ret**	1	1	2	2	**2**	1	WD	WD	WD	620
3	(England) Tommy Bridewell	Yamaha	7	9	4	5	4	3	6	7	Ret	4	5	DNS	4	7	8	1	3	3	Ret	9	3	10	4	5	6	3	587
4	(Australia) Josh Brookes	Yamaha	**Ret**	2	2	**1**	2	Ret	4	4	6	8	1	1	2	**2**	1	4	DSQ	4	3	Ret	Ret	3	Ret	8	4	**5**	584
5	(England) Dan Linfoot	Kawasaki	11	8	6	7	7	6	7	6	5	7	4	**4**	5	4	3	7	11	8	14	6	4	4	7	4	8	6	577
6	(England) Chris Walker	Kawasaki	2	5	Ret	8	6	Ret	5	3	4	9	7	5	Ret	5	7	3	8	11	10	16	Ret	12	12	10	Ret	10	525
BSB Riders Cup
7	(Scotland) Stuart Easton	Kawasaki	6	6	5	4	Ret	13	3	5	10	14	16	7	9	6	5	9	Ret	5	4	3	6	5	6	6	5	4	231
8	(England) James Ellison	Kawasaki	3	**3**	3	3	3	2	Ret	8	3	DNS						DNS	DNS	14	11	4	7	11	3	**7**	2	2	223
9	(Australia) Josh Waters	Suzuki	15	16	13	13	10	10	Ret	16	14	1	17	12	8	9	6	5	5	6	**5**	1	8	7	5	2	**16**	15	192
10	(United States) John Hopkins	Suzuki	5	11	Ret	9	9	7	9	11	9	10	8	8	6	Ret	Ret	13	DNS	**Ret**	9	Ret	5	Ret	DNS	Ret	10	8	125
11	(England) Peter Hickman	Kawasaki					19	Ret																					120
11	(England) Peter Hickman	Honda							14	13	12	13	12	10	7	Ret	13	6	1	7	7	12	Ret	9	9	13	11	9	120
12	(England) Jon Kirkham	Kawasaki	21	DNS	9	10			17	17	13	6	11	6	14	8	9	8	6	12	13	Ret	**Ret**	Ret	15	3	7	7	118
13	(England) James Westmoreland	BMW	10	7	8	6	Ret	Ret	10	Ret								11	Ret	10	8	14	10	8	10	9	9	14	96
14	(England) Howie Mainwaring	Kawasaki					NC	16	Ret	DNS	11	DNS	18	9	10	Ret	15	15	12	13	12	8	Ret	Ret	14	1	3	Ret	82
15	(Czech Republic) Jakub Smrž	Ducati	9	Ret	10	11	Ret	8	12	12	7	Ret	**6**	13	11	12	10	DNS	DNS							14	12	11	82
16	(England) Richard Cooper	Kawasaki	8	15	7	Ret	10	9	11	9	8	2	DNS	DNS															69
17	(Switzerland) Patric Muff	BMW	14	14	14	15	8	Ret	DNS	DNS	15	DNS	10	11	12	10	Ret	14	13	9	16	Ret	Ret	14	13	Ret	13	13	60
18	(England) Michael Rutter	BMW	12	17	11	12	Ret	14	13	10	DNS	DNS	9	DNS	Ret	11	11	19	10	16	Ret								47
19	(France) Julien Da Costa	Honda					Ret	5												15	6			6	8	15	14	Ret	43
20	(England) Ben Wilson	Kawasaki	4	10	15	16	Ret	15	16	Ret	17	15	Ret	DNS	DNS	DNS	DNS	12	9	Ret	19	13	Ret	Ret	DNS	12	Ret	17	40
21	(England) Gary Mason	Kawasaki									Ret	11			Ret	17	18	16	4	Ret	Ret	11	Ret	15	Ret	11	DNS	DNS	29
22	(England) Barry Burrell	Kawasaki	Ret	20	19	18	11	11	8	Ret	Ret	DNS	13	14	13	Ret	Ret	Ret	DNS	Ret	DNS	19	15	Ret	Ret				27
23	(Northern Ireland) Keith Farmer	Kawasaki	19	19	Ret	Ret	14	DNS	15	14	Ret	3	14	DNS	17	13	Ret	DNS	DNS										26
24	(Australia) Glen Richards	Kawasaki													16	14	12	10	7										21
25	(Sweden) Filip Backlund	Yamaha																		17	15	Ret	9	13	11	Ret	15	12	21
26	(England) Martin Jessopp	BMW	13	12	12	14					20	19	19	16	Ret	DNS	DNS	18	Ret	Ret	17	18	14	17	16	Ret	Ret	DNS	15
27	(Australia) Jed Metcher	Kawasaki																				7	13			18	18	18	12
28	(England) Lee Jackson	BMW									16	18	15	Ret	15	16	16					10	12						12
29	(England) Christian Iddon	Bimota																				**5**	Ret						11
30	(England) Ian Hutchinson	Yamaha	23	Ret	16	Ret	13	12	18	15	18	16	22	17	Ret	19	19												8
31	(England) John Ingram	Kawasaki					16	Ret	Ret	DNS	19	12	20	18	18	18	17	17	14	Ret	18	Ret	16	16	Ret	Ret	17	19	6
32	(Netherlands) Kevin Valk	Kawasaki																				Ret	11						5
33	(England) Scott Smart	Kawasaki													19	15	14	Ret	15										4
34	(England) Harry Hartley	Kawasaki	18	13	17	17	DNS	DNS	DNS	DNS																			3
35	(England) Aaron Zanotti	Suzuki	22	21	18	19	15	18	Ret	Ret	21	17	21	15	21	20	Ret	Ret	Ret	18	20	15	Ret	Ret	19	DNS	23	Ret	3
	(Australia) Bryan Staring	Kawasaki																								17	Ret	16	0
	(Denmark) Robbin Harms	BMW																						Ret	Ret	16	Ret	Ret	0
	(England) Jenny Tinmouth	Honda	27	23	20	20	17	17	19	18	22	DNS	23	19	20	22	Ret							18	20	19	19	22	0
	(France) Christophe Ponsson	Bimota											Ret	DNS	22	21	20	Ret	Ret	Ret	Ret	Ret	17	19	18	20	22	Ret	0
	(Australia) Mitchell Carr	Kawasaki	20	Ret			DNQ	DNQ												Ret	DNS	17	18						0
	(England) Lee Costello	Kawasaki	17	18																									0
	(England) Shaun Winfield	Kawasaki			21	21							24	20										20	17	Ret	20	20	0
	(Brazil) Rhalf Lo Turco	Kawasaki	28	24	22	23	18	19			23	20	Ret	21	23	Ret	21	20	Ret	19	Ret	Ret	Ret			21	21	21	0
	(England) Peter Baker	Kawasaki	26	22	Ret	22																							0
	(Northern Ireland) Michael Dunlop	BMW	24	Ret																									0
	(England) Josh Wainwright	Kawasaki	25	Ret																									0
	(England) Simon Andrews	Honda	Ret	DNS	Ret	DNS																							0
	(England) Joe Burns	Kawasaki																				Ret	Ret						0
	(England) James Hillier	Kawasaki	Ret	DNS																									0
	(Saudi Arabia) Abdulaziz Binladin	BMW																		DNQ	DNQ								0
Pos	Rider	Bike	BRH (England)		OUL (England)		SNE (England)		KNO (Scotland)		BRH (England)		THR (England)		OUL (England)			CAD (England)		DON (England)		ASS (Netherlands)		SIL (England)		BRH (England)			Pts

Colour	Result
Gold	Winner
Silver	Second place
Bronze	Third place
Green	Points classification
Blue	Non-points classification
Blue	Non-classified finish (NC)
Purple	Retired, not classified (Ret)
Red	Did not qualify (DNQ)
Red	Did not pre-qualify (DNPQ)
Black	Disqualified (DSQ)
White	Did not start (DNS)
White	Withdrew (WD)
White	Race cancelled (C)
Blank	Did not practice (DNP)
Blank	Did not arrive (DNA)
Blank	Excluded (EX)

**Bold** – Pole
Italics – Fastest Lap
