= Dan Linfoot =

English motorcycle racer

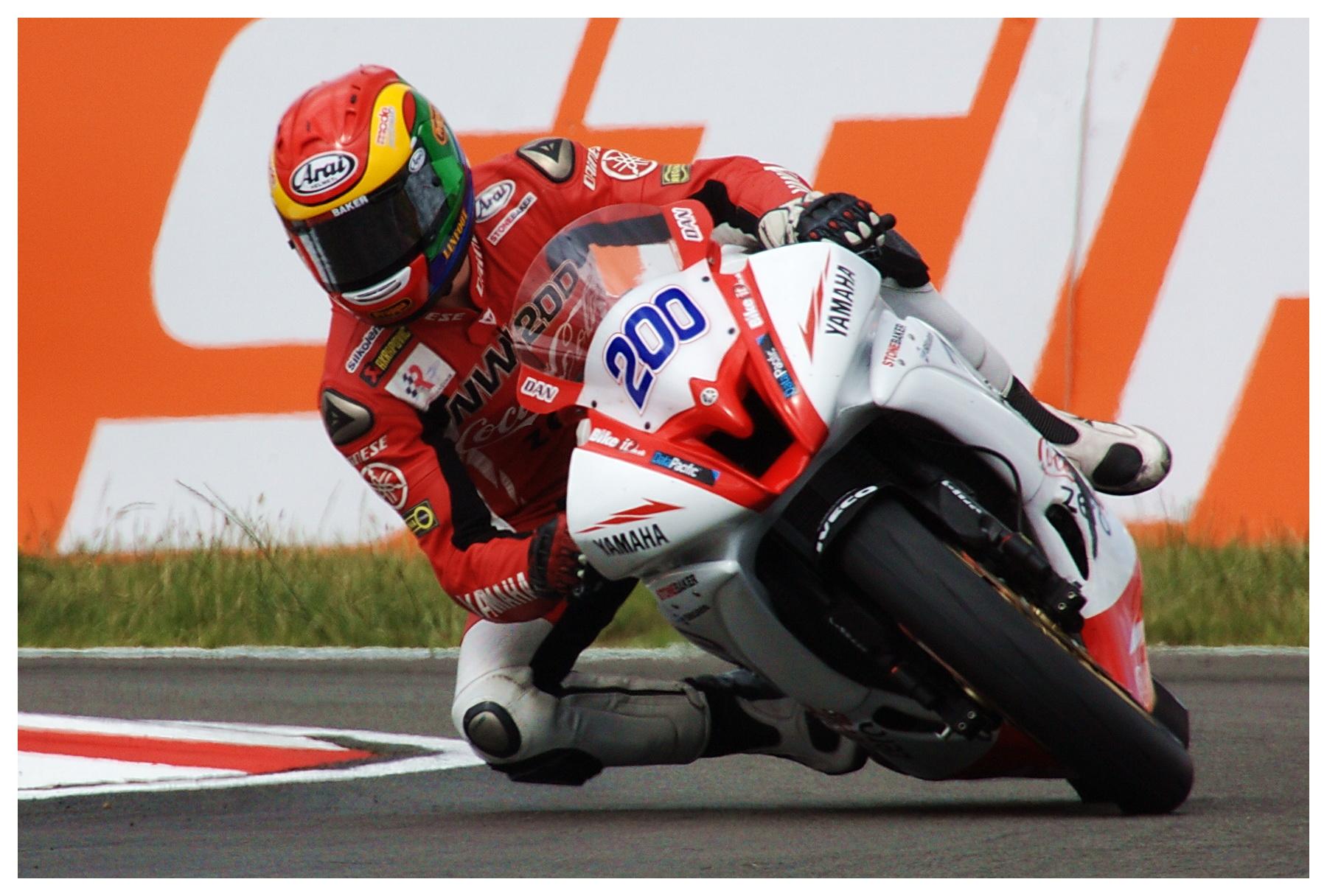
- Linfoot in 2009
- Nationality: English
- Born: 8 July 1988 (age 38); Knaresborough, North Yorkshire, England
- Current team: Yoshimura Sert Motul
- Bike number: 12
Motorcycle racing career statistics
British Superbike Championship
Active years	2009–2021
Manufacturers	Honda, Yamaha
Championships	0
2021 championship position	16th (69 points)
Starts / Wins / Podiums / Poles / F. laps / Points; 245 / 2 / 16 / 4 / 0 / 2,360

Daniel Craig Linfoot (born 8 July 1988) is a British motorcycle racer who currently competes in the FIM Endurance World Championship for the Yoshimura Sert Motul team, riding a Suzuki GSX-R1000. He has previously competed in the British Superbike Championship, and the British Superstock category. Linfoot is the 2023 National Superstock 1000 champion.

Linfoot has been racing since 2002, when he began his racing career on minibikes, before progressing through to geared bikes in 2003. He competed in the Grand Prix paddock in 2005 with the 125cc category, and rode in the 250cc category in 2006 and 2007, before switching over to World Supersport 600cc, and finally British Superbikes. Until 2018, Linfoot competed in the British Superbike Championship for Honda Racing, a semi-private Honda-supported race team based in Louth, Lincolnshire, aboard a Honda Fireblade CBR1000RR SP2. For 2019, he rode a Yamaha YZF-R1.

== Career ==
=== Starting Out ===
Linfoot started out in 2001–02 in the National Minibike Championships, later moving up the 125cc category in 2004. In 2005, Linfoot came fourth in the championship.

== MotoGP, 125cc, 250cc ==
In 2005, Linfoot make his 125cc Grand Prix debut alongside his compatriot Christian Elkin with a wildcard entry at Donington. Linfoot finish the race in a respectable ninth place after starting from 39th, in a wet race.

Linfoot then went on to ride in the World 250cc championship in 2007 with Team Sicilia aboard Aprilia RSV 250 replacing Anthony West. In the same rainy conditions, Linfoot repeated his best result at Donington, finishing the race in ninth again, after starting from 21st on the grid.

However, Linfoot failed to score points in the six remaining races, and was replaced by Federico Sandi for the following season.

== European Superstock Championship ==
Linfoot competed in the European Superstock Championship in 2008.

=== British Supersport & Superbikes 2009-present ===
For the 2009 season, Linfoot moved back to England to race in the British Supersport Championship, Linfoot started well gaining a third position at the first meeting at Brands Hatch. Linfoot was later injured due to a big crash during qualifying at Snetterton breaking his metatarsals. Linfoot returned three meetings later at Brands Hatch, gaining seventh and fifth places before been called up to the British Superbike Championship to replace the injured Jon Kirkham. Just a week after making his BSB debut, Linfoot was given a wildcard entry to the World Supersport Championship at Magny-Cours.

For the 2010 season, Linfoot was signed by Rob Mac to ride the Motorpoint/Henderson Yamaha in the British Superbike Championship.

In 2017, Linfoot clenched his first British Superbike race win at Silverstone while riding for Honda Racing UK. He followed it by another victory at Oulton Park 7 days later.

== Career statistics ==
Stats correct as of 9 July 2012

=== All Time ===
Series	Years active	Races	Poles	Podiums	**Wins**	**2nd place**	**3rd place**	Fast Laps	Titles
British 125cc	^{2004-06}	31	2	7	2	4	1	0	0
125cc	^{2005}	1	0	0	0	0	0	0	0
250cc	^{2006-07}	13	0	0	0	0	0	0	0
European Superstock 600 **(SS600)**	^{2008}	9	0	3	2	0	1	1	0
British Supersport **(BSS)**	^{2009}	6	0	3	0	1	2	0	0
British Superbike **(BSB)**	^{2009-12}	52	0	0	0	0	0	0	0
Total		112	2	14	4	5	4	1	0

=== Grand Prix motorcycle racing ===
==== Races by year ====
(key) (Races in bold indicate pole position, races in italics indicate fastest lap)

Year	Class	Team	1	2	3	4	5	6	7	8	9	10	11	12	13	14	15	16	17	Pos	Pts
2005	125cc	Honda	ESP	POR	CHN	FRA	ITA	CAT	NED	GBR; 9	GER	CZE	JPN	MAL	QAT	AUS	TUR	VAL		27th	7
2006	250cc	Honda	ESP	QAT	TUR	CHN	FRA; DNS	ITA; 17	CAT; Ret	NED	GBR; Ret	GER; 19	CZE; Ret	MAL	AUS	JPN	POR; Ret	VAL		NC	0
2007	250cc	Aprilia	QAT	ESP	TUR	CHN	FRA	ITA	CAT	GBR; 9	NED; Ret	GER; Ret	CZE; 20	SMR; Ret	POR; Ret	JPN; Ret	AUS	MAL	VAL	24th	7

==== British 125cc Championship ====
Year	Make	1	2	3	4	5	6	7	8	9	10	11	12	13	Pos	Pts	Ref
2004	Honda	SIL; 15	BHI	SNE; 23	OUL; 13	MON; 18	THR; 20	BHGP; 16	KNO; 18	MAL; 20	CRO; 9	CAD; 18	OUL; 10	DON; 23	**24th**	**17**	
2005	Honda	BHI; 7	THR; Ret	MAL; 2	OUL; 2	MON; 2	CRO; 2	KNO; Ret	SNE; Ret	SIL; 8	CAD; 6	OUL; 5	DON; Ret	BHGP; 3	**4th**	**134**	
2006	Honda	BHI; **1**	DON; Ret	THR; Ret	OUL; **1**	MON; C	MAL	SNE	KNO	OUL	CRO	CAD	SIL	BHGP	**13th**	**50**	

==== European Superstock 600 ====
Yr	Class	Bike	ESP (Spain)	NED (Netherlands)	ITA (Italy)	GER (Germany)	SMR (San Marino)	CZE (Czech Republic)	GBR (United Kingdom)	EUR (European Union)	FRA (France)	POR (Portugal)	Pts	Pos	Ref
2008	STK 600	Yamaha	3	1	DNS	6	6	4	Ret	4	1	11	5th	117	

==== British Supersport Championship ====
Yr	Class	Bike	BHI (England)	OUL (England)	DON (England)	THR (England)	SNE (England)	KNO (Scotland)	MAL (England)	BHGP (England)	CAD (England)	CRO (England)	SIL (England)	OUL (England)	Pos	Pts
2009	BSS	Yamaha	3	Ret	2	3	DNS	Inj	Inj	Ret	5	7			7th	72

==== British Superbike Championship ====
(key) (Races in bold indicate pole position; races in italics indicate fastest lap)

Year	Bike	1		2		3			4		5		6			7			8			9		10		11		12			Pos	Pts	Ref
Year	Bike	R1	R2	R1	R2	R1	R2	R3	R1	R2	R1	R2	R1	R2	R3	R1	R2	R3	R1	R2	R3	R1	R2	R1	R2	R1	R2	R1	R2	R3	Pos	Pts	Ref
2009	Yamaha	BHI	BHI	OUL	OUL	DON	DON		THR	THR	SNE	SNE	KNO	KNO		MAL	MAL		BHGP	BHGP	BHGP	CAD	CAD	CRO	CRO	SIL; 18	SIL; Ret	OUL; 19	OUL; 17	OUL; 15	36th	1	
2010	Yamaha	BHI; 9	BHI; Ret	THR; Ret	THR; 12	OUL; 9	OUL; 14		CAD; 10	CAD; Ret	MAL; Ret	MAL; 14	KNO; Ret	KNO; C		SNE; 13	SNE; Ret	SNE; 12	BHGP; 13	BHGP; 9	BHGP; Ret	CAD; 9	CAD; 13	CRO; 5	CRO; 9	SIL; 10	SIL; 6	OUL; 11	OUL; Ret	OUL; 10	14th	101	
2011	Honda	BHI; 8	BHI; 8	OUL; 10	OUL; 15	CRO; 17	CRO; Ret		THR; 5	THR; 6	KNO; Ret	KNO; 15	SNE; 18	SNE; 12		OUL	OUL		BHGP	BHGP	BHGP	CAD	CAD	DON	DON	SIL; 15	SIL; 10	BHGP; NC	BHGP; 9	BHGP; Ret	19th	63	
2012	BMW	BHI; Ret	BHI; C	THR; 12	THR; 11	OUL; 15	OUL; 9	OUL; 12	SNE; 11	SNE; 11	KNO; WD	KNO; WD	OUL	OUL	OUL	BHGP	BHGP		CAD	CAD		DON	DON	ASS	ASS	SIL	SIL	BHGP	BHGP	BHGP	20th	31	

Year	Make	1			2			3			4			5			6			7			8			9			10			11			12			Pos	Pts
Year	Make	R1	R2	R3	R1	R2	R3	R1	R2	R3	R1	R2	R3	R1	R2	R3	R1	R2	R3	R1	R2	R3	R1	R2	R3	R1	R2	R3	R1	R2	R3	R1	R2	R3	R1	R2	R3	Pos	Pts
2013	Honda	BHI; Ret	BHI; DNS		THR	THR		OUL	OUL		KNO; 8	KNO; 12		SNE; 12	SNE; 8		BHGP; 7	BHGP; 9		OUL; 10	OUL; 7	OUL; 11	CAD; 11	CAD; 11		DON; 15	DON; 14		ASS; Ret	ASS; 9		SIL; Ret	SIL; 13		BHGP; 12	BHGP; 7	BHGP; 10	12th	102
2014	Kawasaki	BHI; 11	BHI; 8		OUL; 6	OUL; 7		SNE; 7	SNE; 6		KNO; 7	KNO; 6		BHGP; 5	BHGP; 7		THR; 4	**THR**; 4		OUL; 5	OUL; 4	OUL; 3	CAD; 7	CAD; 11		DON; 8	DON; 14		ASS; 6	ASS; 4		SIL; 4	SIL; 7		BHGP; 4	BHGP; 8	BHGP; 6	5th	577

Year	Make	1		2		3			4		5		6			7		8			9			10		11		12			Pos	Pts
Year	Make	R1	R2	R1	R2	R1	R2	R3	R1	R2	R1	R2	R1	R2	R3	R1	R2	R1	R2	R3	R1	R2	R3	R1	R2	R1	R2	R1	R2	R3	Pos	Pts
2015	Honda	DON; 4	DON; 2	BHI	BHI	OUL	OUL		SNE; 5	SNE; 10	KNO; Ret	KNO; 12	BHGP; 8	BHGP; Ret		THR; 2	**THR**; 5	CAD; 10	CAD; 10		OUL; 5	OUL; 3	OUL; 6	ASS; 14	ASS; 22	SIL; 7	SIL; 3	BHGP; 13	BHGP; 10	BHGP; 4	5th	556
2016	Honda	SIL; 5	**SIL**; 9	OUL; Ret	OUL; Ret	BHI; 10	BHI; 5		KNO; 2	**KNO**; 3	SNE; 2	SNE; 2	THR; Ret	THR; 9		BHGP; 7	BHGP; 8	CAD; Ret	CAD; 6		OUL; 5	OUL; 4	OUL; Ret	DON; 7	DON; 2	ASS; 4	ASS; 4	BHGP; 4	BHGP; 4	BHGP; 6	4th	602
2017	Honda	DON; 11	DON; 12	BHI; 5	BHI; 6	OUL; 16	OUL; 16		KNO; Ret	KNO; 6	SNE; 5	SNE; 7	BHGP; 2	**BHGP**; Ret		THR; 15	THR; 12	CAD; Ret	CAD; DNS		SIL; 16	SIL; Ret	SIL; 1	OUL; Ret	OUL; 1	ASS; 11	ASS; 9	BHGP; DNS	BHGP; 9	BHGP; 7	10th	163
2018	Honda	DON; 4	DON; 3	BHI; DNS	BHI; DNS	OUL	OUL		SNE; Ret	SNE; 4	KNO; Ret	KNO; 13	BHGP; Ret	BHGP; DNS		THR	THR	CAD	CAD		SIL; 12	SIL; 11	SIL; Ret	OUL; 10	OUL; 11	ASS; 15	ASS; Ret	BHGP; DNS	BHGP; DNS	BHGP; DNS	18th	66

Year	Bike	1		2		3			4		5		6		7		8		9			10		11		12			Pos	Pts
Year	Bike	R1	R2	R1	R2	R1	R2	R3	R1	R2	R1	R2	R1	R2	R1	R2	R1	R2	R1	R2	R3	R1	R2	R1	R2	R1	R2	R3	Pos	Pts
2019	Yamaha	SIL; 13	SIL; 9	OUL; 13	OUL; 13	DON; Ret	DON; Ret	DON; Ret	BRH; 2	BRH; 5	KNO; 13	KNO; 7	SNE; 14	SNE; 11	THR; 15	THR; 10	CAD; Ret	CAD; 15	OUL; DNS	OUL; Ret	OUL; 16	ASS; Ret	ASS; 9	DON; Ret	DON; 19	BHGP; 12	BHGP; 12	BHGP; 10	14th	96

Year	Bike	1			2			3			4			5			6			7			8			9			10			11			Pos	Pts
Year	Bike	R1	R2	R3	R1	R2	R3	R1	R2	R3	R1	R2	R3	R1	R2	R3	R1	R2	R3	R1	R2	R3	R1	R2	R3	R1	R2	R3	R1	R2	R3	R1	R2	R3	Pos	Pts
2020	Yamaha	DON; 14	DON; Ret	DON; Ret	SNE; DNS	SNE; DNS	SNE; DNS	SIL	SIL	SIL	OUL	OUL	OUL	DON	DON	DON	BHGP	BHGP	BHGP																24th	2
2022	BMW	SIL; Ret	SIL; 12	SIL; 14	OUL; 20	OUL; 20	OUL; 15	DON; 20	DON; 18	DON; Ret	KNO; Ret	KNO; 18	KNO; Ret	BRH; Ret	BRH; DNS	BRH; DNS	THR	THR	THR	CAD	CAD	CAD	SNE	SNE	SNE	OUL	OUL	OUL	DON	DON	DON	BRH	BRH	BRH	26th	7

=== FIM Endurance World Championship ===
==== By team ====
Year	Team	Bike	Rider	TC
2024	(France) Yoshimura SERT Motul	Suzuki GSX-R1000R	(France) Gregg Black (United Kingdom) Dan Linfoot (France) Etienne Masson	1st

Year	Team	Bike	Tyre	Rider	Pts	TC
2025	(France) Yoshimura SERT Motul	Suzuki GSX-R1000R	**B**	(France) Gregg Black (France) Étienne Masson (United Kingdom) Dan Linfoot	52*	6th*

=== Suzuka 8 Hours results ===
Year	Class	Team	Co-riders	Bike	Pos
2024	**EWC**	(Japan) Yoshimura SERT Motul	(Spain) Albert Arenas (Japan) Cocoro Atsumi	Suzuki GSX-R1000R	3rd
2025	**EWC**	(Japan) Yoshimura SERT Motul	(France) Gregg Black (Japan) Cocoro Atsumi	Suzuki GSX-R1000R	3rd
2026	**EWC**	(Japan) Yoshimura SERT Motul	(France) Gregg Black (Japan) Cocoro Atsumi	Suzuki GSX-R1000R	TBD
