= 2015 British Superbike Championship =

British motorcycle racing season

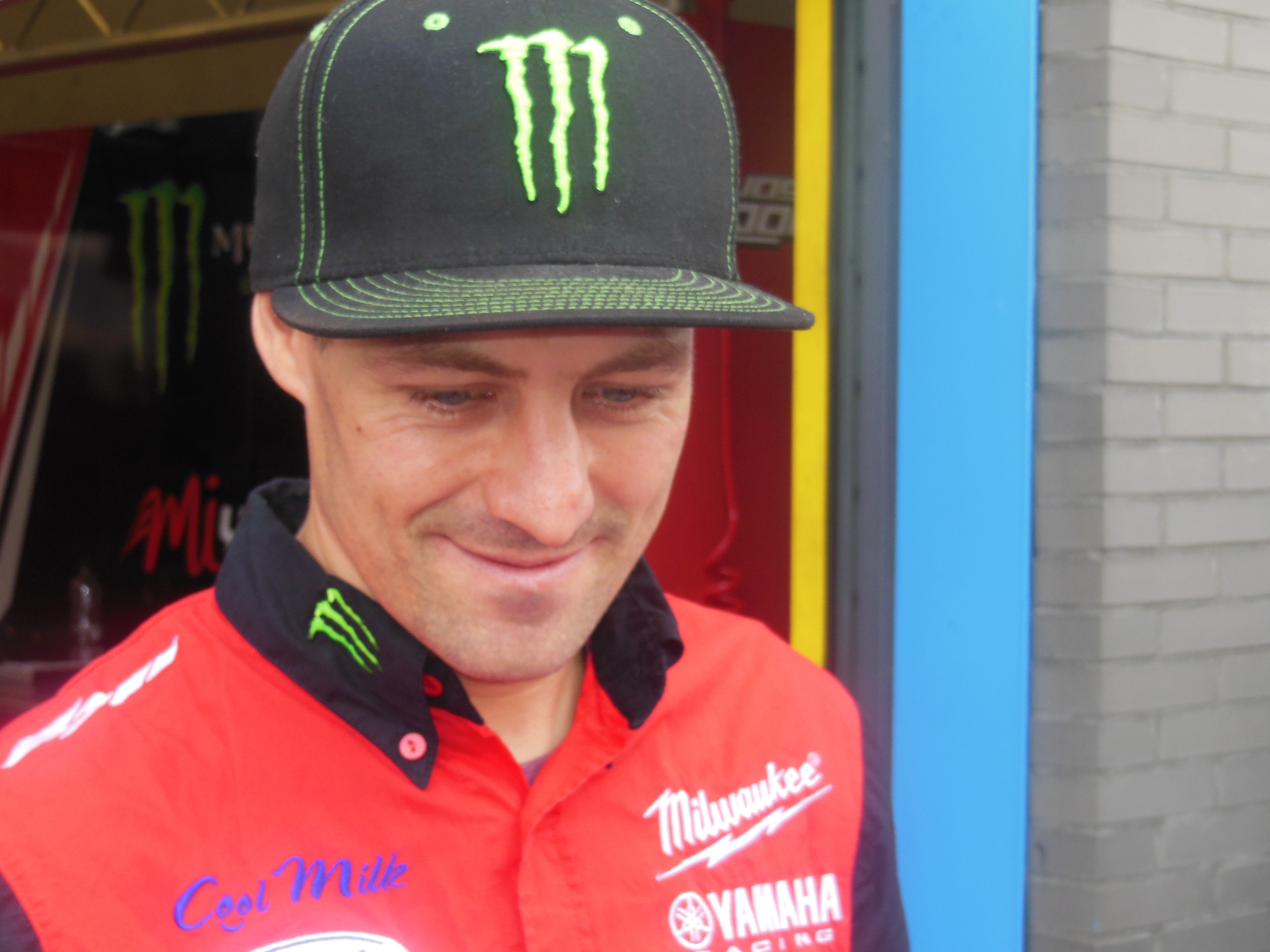
2015 champion, Josh Brookes

The 2015 British Superbike Championship season was the 28th British Superbike Championship season. It began at Donington Park on 6 April and ended at the Brands Hatch GP circuit on 18 October. Shane Byrne was the defending champion but lost the title to Australian Josh Brookes onboard a Milwaukee Yamaha R1.

== Teams and riders ==
Team	Constructor	No.	Rider	Rounds
Milwaukee Yamaha	Yamaha	2	(Australia) Broc Parkes	1–7
Milwaukee Yamaha	Yamaha	2	(England) Adam Jenkinson	7
Milwaukee Yamaha	Yamaha	25	(Australia) Josh Brookes	All
Milwaukee Yamaha	Yamaha	96	(Czech Republic) Jakub Smrž	10–12
Smiths Racing	BMW	3	(Australia) Billy McConnell	All
Honda Racing	Honda	4	(England) Dan Linfoot	1-2, 4–12
Honda Racing	Honda	20	(England) Jenny Tinmouth	All
Honda Racing	Honda	22	(Australia) Jason O'Halloran	1–7
Honda Racing	Honda	86	(France) Julien Da Costa	9, 11
PBM Kawasaki	Kawasaki	5	(Scotland) Stuart Easton	1–6, 9–10
PBM Kawasaki	Kawasaki	66	(England) Ian Hutchinson	1–3, 7
PBM Kawasaki	Kawasaki	67	(England) Shane Byrne	All
PBM Kawasaki	Kawasaki	83	(England) Danny Buchan	11–12
JG Speedfit Kawasaki	Kawasaki	6	(England) James Westmoreland	1–9, 12
JG Speedfit Kawasaki	Kawasaki	6	(England) Luke Stapleford	11
JG Speedfit Kawasaki	Kawasaki	66	(England) Luke Stapleford	12
JG Speedfit Kawasaki	Kawasaki	77	(England) James Ellison	1–7, 9–12
Tyco BMW	BMW	7	(Northern Ireland) Michael Laverty	All
Tyco BMW	BMW	46	(England) Tommy Bridewell	All
Anvil Hire TAG Racing	Kawasaki	8	(England) Shaun Winfield	All
Anvil Hire TAG Racing	Kawasaki	47	(England) Richard Cooper	1–7
Anvil Hire TAG Racing	Kawasaki	99	(Sweden) Filip Backlund	All
Be Wiser Kawasaki	Kawasaki	9	(England) Chris Walker	1–10
Be Wiser Kawasaki	Kawasaki	83	(England) Danny Buchan	1–10
Team WD-40 Kawasaki	Kawasaki	11	(Scotland) Taylor Mackenzie	1–7, 9–12
Team WD-40 Kawasaki	Kawasaki	44	(Republic of Ireland) Jack Kennedy	All
Quattro Plant Kawasaki	Kawasaki	12	(England) Luke Mossey	All
Quattro Plant Kawasaki	Kawasaki	43	(England) Howie Mainwaring-Smart	All
Buildbase BMW	BMW	14	(England) Lee Jackson	All
Buildbase BMW	BMW	23	(Japan) Ryuichi Kiyonari	1–9, 11
Buildbase BMW	BMW	47	(England) Richard Cooper	8–12
Lloyd's British Moto Rapido	Ducati	15	(United States) John Hopkins	6–12
Lloyd's British Moto Rapido	Ducati	96	(Czech Republic) Jakub Smrž	1–3
Motodex Performance First Racing	BMW	16	(Australia) David Johnson	1
Motodex Performance First Racing	BMW	27	(Denmark) Robbin Harms	1–3
Gearlink Kawasaki	Kawasaki	19	(England) Michael Rutter	2–3, 5–6
Gearlink Kawasaki	Kawasaki	71	(England) Barry Burrell	7
Gearlink Kawasaki	Kawasaki	71	(Australia) Jed Metcher	9–11
Gearlink Kawasaki	Kawasaki	53	(England) Joe Burns	1
Bennetts Suzuki	Suzuki	21	(Australia) Josh Waters	All
Bennetts Suzuki	Suzuki	24	(England) Christian Iddon	All
PR Racing	Kawasaki	27	(Denmark) Robbin Harms	11–12
PR Racing	Kawasaki	68	(Australia) Jed Metcher	4–8
Morello Racing Kawasaki	Kawasaki	28	(England) Victor Cox	1–4
Morello Racing Kawasaki	Kawasaki	39	(England) Lee Costello	4–7
Morello Racing Kawasaki	Kawasaki	56	(England) John Ingram	8–9, 11–12
Morello Racing Kawasaki	Kawasaki	69	(South Africa) David McFadden	3
Morello Racing Kawasaki	Kawasaki	86	(England) Daniel Johnson	1–2
Tsingtao Hampshire MV Agusta	MV Agusta	31	(Italy) Vittorio Iannuzzo	4–5
Riders Motorcycles BMW	BMW	40	(England) Martin Jessopp	1–4, 6–12
SBKCity Kawasaki	Kawasaki	45	(Brazil) Rhalf Lo Turco	1–4, 6, 8–9, 11–12
Joe Burns Racing	Kawasaki	53	(England) Joe Burns	4–6
RAF Reserves BMW	BMW	60	(England) Peter Hickman	All
A-Plant Yamaha	Yamaha	64	(England) Aaron Zanotti	All
Moto-Breakers Racing	Kawasaki	82	(England) James Rose	4–6

== Race calendar and results ==
2015 Calendar
Main Season
Round		Circuit	Date	Pole position	Fastest lap	Winning rider	Winning team
1	R1	(England) Donington Park	6 April	(Japan) Ryuichi Kiyonari	(England) Shane Byrne	(England) James Ellison	JG Speedfit Kawasaki
1	R2	(England) Donington Park	6 April		(England) Shane Byrne	(England) Shane Byrne	PBM Kawasaki
2	R1	(England) Brands Hatch Indy	19 April	(England) James Ellison	(England) James Ellison	(England) James Ellison	JG Speedfit Kawasaki
2	R2	(England) Brands Hatch Indy	19 April		(England) James Ellison	(England) James Ellison	JG Speedfit Kawasaki
3	R1	(England) Oulton Park	4 May	(Australia) Josh Brookes	(Australia) Josh Brookes	(England) Tommy Bridewell	Tyco BMW Motorrad Racing
3	R2	(England) Oulton Park	4 May		(England) Shane Byrne	(Scotland) Stuart Easton	PBM Kawasaki
4	R1	(England) Snetterton 300	21 June	(England) Shane Byrne	(England) Shane Byrne	(England) Shane Byrne	PBM Kawasaki
4	R2	(England) Snetterton 300	21 June		(England) Shane Byrne	(England) Shane Byrne	PBM Kawasaki
5	R1	(Scotland) Knockhill	5 July	(England) Shane Byrne	(England) James Ellison	(England) Shane Byrne	PBM Kawasaki
5	R2	(Scotland) Knockhill	5 July		(England) Shane Byrne	(England) Shane Byrne	PBM Kawasaki
6	R1	(England) Brands Hatch GP	19 July	(England) Shane Byrne	(England) Shane Byrne	(Australia) Josh Brookes	Milwaukee Yamaha
6	R2	(England) Brands Hatch GP	19 July		(Australia) Josh Brookes	(Australia) Josh Brookes	Milwaukee Yamaha
7	R1	(England) Thruxton	2 August	(Australia) Josh Brookes	(England) Dan Linfoot	(Australia) Josh Brookes	Milwaukee Yamaha
7	R2	(England) Thruxton	2 August		(Australia) Josh Brookes	(Australia) Josh Brookes	Milwaukee Yamaha
8	R1	(England) Cadwell Park	23 August	(Australia) Josh Brookes	(Australia) Josh Brookes	(Australia) Josh Brookes	Milwaukee Yamaha
8	R2	(England) Cadwell Park	23 August		(Australia) Josh Brookes	(Australia) Josh Brookes	Milwaukee Yamaha
9	R1	(England) Oulton Park	5 September	(England) Shane Byrne	(England) Shane Byrne	(England) Shane Byrne	PBM Kawasaki
9	R2	(England) Oulton Park	6 September		(Australia) Josh Brookes	(Australia) Josh Brookes	Milwaukee Yamaha
9	R3	(England) Oulton Park	6 September		(Australia) Josh Brookes	(England) Shane Byrne	PBM Kawasaki
The Showdown
10	R1	(Netherlands) TT Circuit Assen	20 September	(Australia) Josh Brookes	(Australia) Josh Brookes	(Australia) Josh Brookes	Milwaukee Yamaha
10	R2	(Netherlands) TT Circuit Assen	20 September		(Australia) Josh Brookes	(Australia) Josh Brookes	Milwaukee Yamaha
11	R1	(England) Silverstone Arena GP	4 October	(Australia) Josh Brookes	(England) Shane Byrne	(Australia) Josh Brookes	Milwaukee Yamaha
11	R2	(England) Silverstone Arena GP	4 October		(England) James Ellison	(Australia) Josh Brookes	Milwaukee Yamaha
12	R1	(England) Brands Hatch GP	17 October	(Australia) Josh Brookes	(Australia) Josh Brookes	(Australia) Josh Brookes	Milwaukee Yamaha
12	R2	(England) Brands Hatch GP	18 October		(Australia) Josh Brookes	(Australia) Josh Brookes	Milwaukee Yamaha
12	R3	(England) Brands Hatch GP	18 October		(England) Howie Mainwaring	(Northern Ireland) Michael Laverty	Tyco BMW Motorrad Racing

== Championship standings ==
=== Riders' championship ===
Pos	Rider	Bike	DON (England)		BRH (England)		OUL (England)		SNE (England)		KNO (Scotland)		BRH (England)		THR (England)		CAD (England)		OUL (England)			ASS (Netherlands)		SIL (England)		BRH (England)			Pts
Pos	Rider	Bike	R1	R2	R1	R2	R1	R2	R1	R2	R1	R2	R1	R2	R1	R2	R1	R2	R1	R2	R3	R1	R2	R1	R2	R1	R2	R3	Pts
The Championship Showdown
1	(Australia) Josh Brookes	Yamaha	3	6	3	3	**2**	**3**	2	2	3	3	1	1	**1**	1	**1**	**1**	4	1	**2**	**1**	**1**	**1**	1	**1**	**1**	**Ret**	703
2	(England) Shane Byrne	Kawasaki	2	**1**	2	2	3	Ret	**1**	**1**	**1**	1	**Ret**	**2**	4	2	6	4	**1**	**Ret**	1	4	5	2	**5**	2	2	3	662
3	(England) James Ellison	Kawasaki	1	12	**1**	**1**	6	2	Ret	7	Ret	**Ret**	3	4	DNS	DNS			2	5	5	2	2	5	17	6	5	2	614
4	(Northern Ireland) Michael Laverty	BMW	9	7	13	19	8	4	Ret	4	4	6	5	5	9	6	5	Ret	9	7	12	3	9	6	2	9	3	1	601
5	(England) Dan Linfoot	Honda	4	2					5	10	Ret	12	8	Ret	2	**5**	10	10	5	3	6	14	22	7	3	13	10	4	556
6	(England) Tommy Bridewell	BMW	6	8	Ret	6	1	Ret	4	5	7	DNS	4	Ret	Ret	4	4	3	Ret	Ret	3	8	Ret	9	7	11	11	12	545
BSB Riders Cup
7	(England) Luke Mossey	Kawasaki	15	19	12	24	Ret	13	9	13	8	Ret	7	7	6	3	7	6	6	4	11	Ret	3	Ret	10	7	7	6	168
8	(England) Richard Cooper	Kawasaki	10	17	11	15	10	7	10	12	Ret	13	2	3	DNS	Ret													156
8	(England) Richard Cooper	BMW															8	7	7	8	7	6	4	12	6	DNS	DNS	DNS	156
9	(England) Peter Hickman	BMW	5	4	Ret	14	DNS	DNS	12	15	10	9	Ret	13	Ret	Ret	2	2	10	6	Ret	9	13	3	8	12	12	11	150
10	(England) Christian Iddon	Suzuki	7	5	Ret	12	17	15	16	9	Ret	10	13	8	Ret	20	9	13	Ret	9	8	7	6	8	4	4	8	5	146
11	(Scotland) Stuart Easton	Kawasaki	11	3	6	5	4	1	7	6	2	2	Ret	DNS					DNS	DNS	DNS	DNS	DNS						139
12	(England) Danny Buchan	Kawasaki	Ret	Ret	14	8	Ret	17	13	17	6	7	Ret	DNS	Ret	Ret	Ret	8	3	2	4	10	12	Ret	14	8	9	7	125
13	(Australia) Jason O'Halloran	Honda	19	11	5	10	7	5	3	3	5	5	Ret	9	DNS	DNS													103
14	(England) Lee Jackson	BMW	13	13	18	23	15	10	Ret	19	11	11	12	11	DNS	9	12	11	8	11	13	12	17	11	9	5	6	Ret	101
15	(Australia) Billy McConnell	BMW	Ret	9	9	9	14	8	17	14	12	21	10	6	8	15	3	6	Ret	Ret	15	11	Ret	13	Ret	15	Ret	Ret	98
16	(England) Howie Mainwaring-Smart	Kawasaki	Ret	14	7	7	9	6	8	Ret	Ret	DNS	Ret	17	5	7	15	Ret	Ret	17	10	Ret	16	14	11	14	13	10	90
17	(United States) John Hopkins	Ducati											6	Ret	Ret	Ret	16	Ret	Ret	Ret	Ret	5	11	4	Ret	3	4	8	76
18	(England) Chris Walker	Kawasaki	8	10	10	13	11	9	6	Ret	DNS	DNS	Ret	Ret	15	12	Ret	15	11	13	16	17	8						67
19	(England) James Westmoreland	Kawasaki	Ret	Ret	17	17	13	11	Ret	Ret	9	8	9	14	3	Ret	13	9	Ret	10	14					Ret	18	18	66
20	(Japan) Ryuichi Kiyonari	BMW	**14**	Ret	4	4	5	Ret	21	Ret	Ret	4	16	18	17	17	14	Ret	15	12	9			Ret	16				66
21	(Australia) Broc Parkes	Yamaha	16	Ret	8	11	Ret	22	11	11	14	14	11	10	DNS	DNS													38
22	(Republic of Ireland) Jack Kennedy	Kawasaki	Ret	23	Ret	18	Ret	18	15	Ret	Ret	17	14	12	7	Ret	11	14	Ret	Ret	DNS	13	7	DNS	DNS	Ret	Ret	DNS	35
23	(England) Martin Jessopp	BMW	23	22	16	20	16	14	18	16			Ret	15	10	8	19	12	12	14	17	Ret	15	Ret	24	16	15	13	32
24	(Czech Republic) Jakub Smrž	Ducati	Ret	24	Ret	21	20	19																					30
24	(Czech Republic) Jakub Smrž	Yamaha																				16	10	10	13	10	14	9	30
25	(Australia) Josh Waters	Suzuki	18	15	15	16	12	12	14	18	Ret	15	17	19	14	10	17	17	14	15	19	15	14	15	18	19	16	Ret	28
26	(Sweden) Filip Backlund	Kawasaki	17	Ret	Ret	22	Ret	16	Ret	8	Ret	DNS	15	16	11	14	18	16	13	16	18	18	20	18	19	20	17	17	19
27	(England) Ian Hutchinson	Kawasaki	20	18	22	25	23	24							13	11													8
28	(England) Adam Jenkinson	Yamaha													12	13													7
29	(England) Luke Stapleford	Kawasaki																						16	12	17	Ret	14	6
30	(Denmark) Robbin Harms	BMW	12	16	Ret	Ret	19	21																					5
30	(Denmark) Robbin Harms	Kawasaki																						Ret	DNS	18	Ret	15	5
31	(England) Michael Rutter	Kawasaki			Ret	27	22	Ret			13	18	Ret	Ret															3
32	(Australia) Jed Metcher	Kawasaki							21	20	15	16	18	Ret	DNS	DNS	Ret	DNS	17	19	21	Ret	18	20	20				1
33	(France) Julien Da Costa	Honda																	16	20	20			17	15				1
	(Scotland) Taylor Mackenzie	Kawasaki	Ret	Ret	Ret	28	18	20	Ret	Ret	16	19	Ret	20	16	16			22	18	22	19	19	Ret	22	Ret	19	16	0
	(England) Shaun Winfield	Kawasaki	21	25	21	29	24	Ret	25	Ret	17	20	20	21	Ret	18	20	18	18	21	Ret	20	21	21	23	22	Ret	Ret	0
	(England) Aaron Zanotti	Yamaha	Ret	Ret	Ret	Ret	Ret	Ret	24	23	19	23	21	23	17	19	21	Ret	21	24	24	22	Ret	22	21	25	21	20	0
	(England) Jenny Tinmouth	Honda	Ret	DNS	23	30	25	26	22	Ret	18	22	19	22	Ret	22	22	20	20	22	25	21	Ret	23	25	23	20	19	0
	(England) Barry Burrell	Kawasaki													18	21													0
	(England) Victor Cox	Kawasaki	Ret	21	19	26	21	23	DNS	22																			0
	(England) John Ingram	Kawasaki															Ret	19	19	23	23			19	Ret	21	Ret	Ret	0
	(England) Daniel Johnson	Kawasaki	22	20	20	Ret																							0
	(England) Joe Burns	Kawasaki	DNS	DNS					20	Ret	Ret	DNS	Ret	DNS															0
	(England) Lee Costello	Kawasaki							23	21	DNS	DNS	Ret	Ret	DNS	DNS													0
	(Brazil) Rhalf Lo Turco	Kawasaki	Ret	DNS	Ret	31	DNS	DNS	Ret	24			Ret	24			23	21	23	25	Ret			24	Ret	24	22	Ret	0
	(Australia) David Johnson	BMW	24	26																									0
	(England) James Rose	Kawasaki									Ret	24	Ret	DNS															0
	(South Africa) David McFadden	Kawasaki					Ret	25																					0
	(Italy) Vittorio Iannuzzo	MV Agusta							Ret	Ret	Ret	DNS																	0
Pos	Rider	Bike	DON (England)		BRH (England)		OUL (England)		SNE (England)		KNO (Scotland)		BRH (England)		THR (England)		CAD (England)		OUL (England)			ASS (Netherlands)		SIL (England)		BRH (England)			Pts

Colour	Result
Gold	Winner
Silver	Second place
Bronze	Third place
Green	Points classification
Blue	Non-points classification
Blue	Non-classified finish (NC)
Purple	Retired, not classified (Ret)
Red	Did not qualify (DNQ)
Red	Did not pre-qualify (DNPQ)
Black	Disqualified (DSQ)
White	Did not start (DNS)
White	Withdrew (WD)
White	Race cancelled (C)
Blank	Did not practice (DNP)
Blank	Did not arrive (DNA)
Blank	Excluded (EX)

**Bold** – Pole
Italics – Fastest Lap

=== Manufacturers' championship ===
Pos	Manufacturer	DON (England)		BRH (England)		OUL (England)		SNE (England)		KNO (Scotland)		BRH (England)		THR (England)		CAD (England)		OUL (England)			ASS (Netherlands)		SIL (England)		BRH (England)			Pts
Pos	Manufacturer	R1	R2	R1	R2	R1	R2	R1	R2	R1	R2	R1	R2	R1	R2	R1	R2	R1	R2	R3	R1	R2	R1	R2	R1	R2	R3	Pts
1	(Japan) Kawasaki	1	1	1	1	3	1	1	1	1	1	2	2	3	2	6	4	1	2	1	2	2	2	5	2	2	2	541
2	(Japan) Yamaha	3	6	3	3	2	3	2	2	3	3	1	1	1	1	1	1	4	1	2	1	1	1	1	1	1	9	531
3	(Germany) BMW	5	4	4	4	1	4	4	4	4	4	4	5	8	4	2	2	7	6	7	3	4	3	2	5	3	1	377
4	(Japan) Honda	4	2	5	10	7	5	3	3	5	5	19	9	2	5	10	10	5	3	6	14	22	3	7	10	4	4	268
5	(Japan) Suzuki	7	5	15	12	12	12	14	9	Ret	10	13	8	14	10	9	13	14	9	8	7	6	8	4	4	8	5	166
6	(Italy) Ducati	Ret	24	Ret	21	20	19					6	Ret	Ret	Ret	16	Ret	Ret	Ret	Ret	5	11	4	Ret	3	4	8	76
	(Italy) MV Agusta							Ret	Ret	Ret	DNS																	0
Pos	Manufacturer	DON (England)		BRH (England)		OUL (England)		SNE (England)		KNO (Scotland)		BRH (England)		THR (England)		CAD (England)		OUL (England)			ASS (Netherlands)		SIL (England)		BRH (England)			Pts
