= Lee Costello =

British motorcycle racer

- Nationality: British
- Born: 23 October 1986 (age 40); Bolton, England

Lee Costello is a Grand Prix motorcycle racer from Great Britain.

== Career statistics ==
2011 – NC, FIM Superstock 1000 Cup, Honda CBR1000RR
2013- 19th, British Superbike Championship #39 Kawasaki ZX-10R
2012- 5th, British National Superstock 1000 Championship #39 Kawasaki ZX-10R
2011- 20th, British National Superstock 1000 Championship #39 Honda CBR1000RR
2010- 29th, British National Superstock 1000 Championship #39 Honda CBR1000RR
2009- NC, British National Superstock 1000 Championship #14 Honda CBR1000RR
2008- 12th, British 125cc Championship #14 Honda RS125R
2007- 8th, British 125cc Championship #87 Honda RS125R
2006- 25th, British 125cc Championship #12 Honda RS125R

=== By season ===
Season	Class	Motorcycle	Team	Number	Race	Win	Podium	Pole	FLap	Pts	Plcd
2008	125cc	Honda	Vent-Axia	67	1	0	0	0	0	0	NC
Total					**1**	**0**	**0**	**0**	**0**	**0**	

==== Races by year ====
(key)

Year	Class	Bike	1	2	3	4	5	6	7	8	9	10	11	12	13	14	15	16	17	Pos.	Pts
2008	125cc	Honda	QAT	SPA	POR	CHN	FRA	ITA	CAT	GBR; 26	NED	GER	CZE	RSM	INP	JPN	AUS	MAL	VAL	NC	0

=== British 125cc Championship ===
(key) (Races in bold indicate pole position, races in italics indicate fastest lap)

Year	Bike	1	2	3	4	5	6	7	8	9	10	11	12	Pos	Pts
2009	Honda	BHI; Ret	OUL; Ret	DON; 5	THR; 10	SNE; Ret	KNO; 8	MAL; 8	BHGP	CAD	CRO	SIL	OUL	**16th**	**33**

=== Superstock 1000 Cup ===
==== Races by year ====
(key) (Races in bold indicate pole position) (Races in italics indicate fastest lap)

Year	Bike	1	2	3	4	5	6	7	8	9	10	Pos	Pts
2011	Honda	NED	MNZ	SMR	ARA	BRN	SIL; 23	NŰR	IMO	MAG	ALG	NC	0

=== British Superbike Championship ===
Year	Make	1			2			3			4			5			6			7			8			9			10			11			12			Pos	Pts
Year	Make	R1	R2	R3	R1	R2	R3	R1	R2	R3	R1	R2	R3	R1	R2	R3	R1	R2	R3	R1	R2	R3	R1	R2	R3	R1	R2	R3	R1	R2	R3	R1	R2	R3	R1	R2	R3	Pos	Pts
2013	Kawasaki	BHI; 19	BHI; Ret		THR; Ret	THR; Ret		OUL; 18	OUL; Ret		KNO; 17	KNO; 14		SNE; Ret	SNE; 14		BHGP; 12	BHGP; Ret		OUL; 19	OUL; 14	OUL; Ret	CAD; 17	CAD; 16		DON; 16	DON; 18		ASS; 15	ASS; 11		SIL; 14	SIL; 17		BHGP; 9	BHGP; 2	BHGP; 13	19th	48
2014	Kawasaki	BHI; 17	BHI; 18		OUL	OUL		SNE	SNE		KNO	KNO		BHGP	BHGP		THR	THR		OUL	OUL	OUL	CAD	CAD		DON	DON		ASS	ASS		SIL	SIL		BHGP	BHGP	BHGP	NC	0

Year	Make	1		2		3			4		5		6			7		8			9			10		11		12			Pos	Pts
Year	Make	R1	R2	R1	R2	R1	R2	R3	R1	R2	R1	R2	R1	R2	R3	R1	R2	R1	R2	R3	R1	R2	R3	R1	R2	R1	R2	R1	R2	R3	Pos	Pts
2015	Kawasaki	DON	DON	BHI	BHI	OUL	OUL		SNE; 23	SNE; 21	KNO; DNS	KNO; DNS	BHGP; Ret	BHGP; Ret		THR; DNS	THR; DNS	CAD	CAD		OUL	OUL	OUL	ASS	ASS	SIL	SIL	BHGP	BHGP	BHGP	NC	0
