= 2013 British Superbike Championship =

British motorcycle racing season

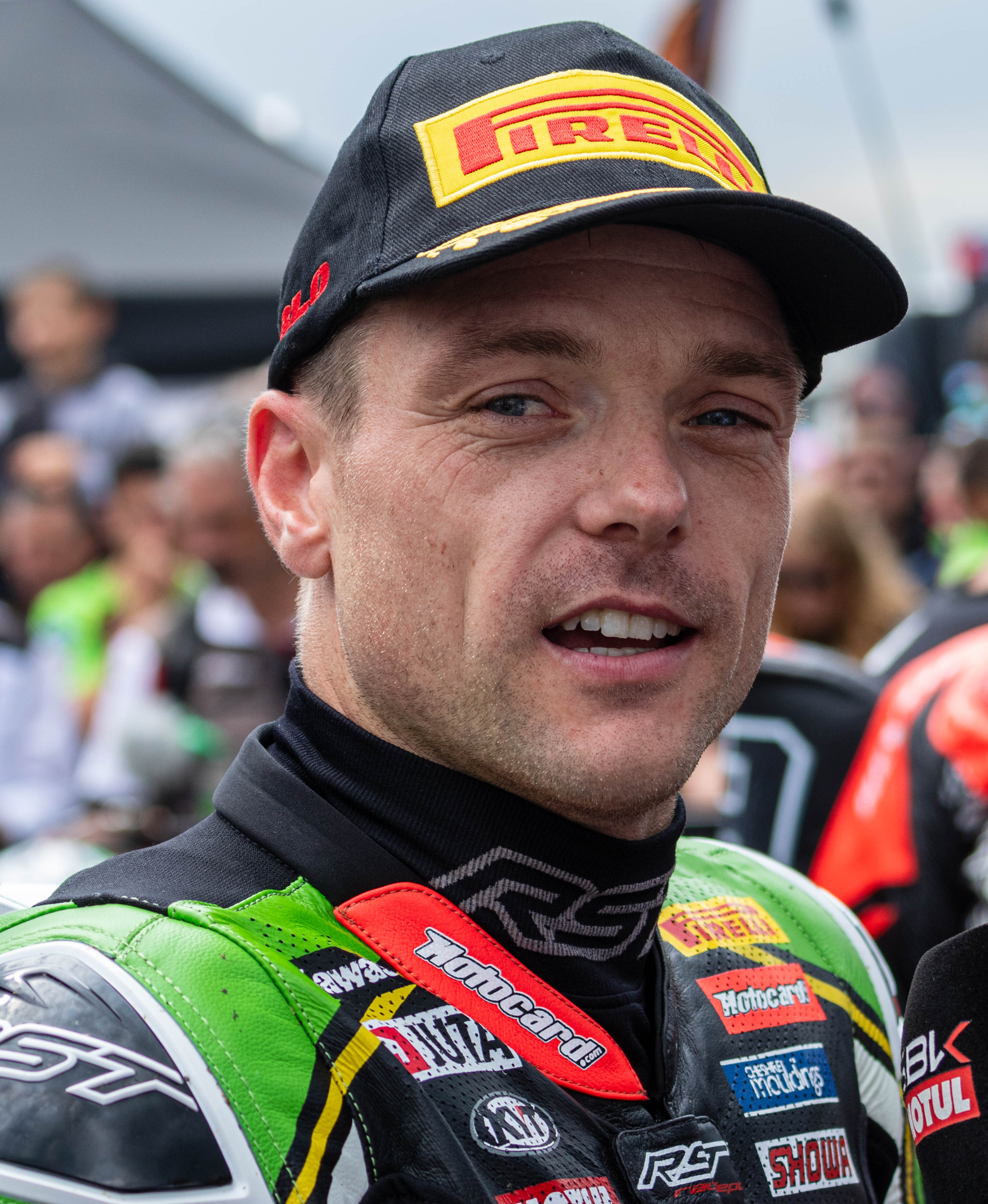
2013 champion, Alex Lowes

The 2013 British Superbike season was the 26th British Superbike Championship season. Shane Byrne stayed in the championship to defend his title from the previous season on the Paul Bird Kawasaki; Ryuichi Kiyonari returned to the championship on board the Samsung Honda to challenge for his fourth British Superbike Championship, with new teammate Alex Lowes looking to win his first championship after showing his pace at the end of the previous season. Josh Brookes stayed on board the Tyco backed TAS Racing Suzuki and James Ellison returned to try to win the illusive British title riding the Milwaukee sponsored Shaun Muir Racing Yamaha in what was billed to be the biggest title fight for years.

== Race calendar and results ==
The 2013 MCE Insurance British Superbike Championship calendar was announced on 10 October 2012 by MSVR.

2013 Calendar
Main Season
Round		Circuit	Date	Pole position	Fastest lap	Winning rider	Winning team
1	R1	(England) Brands Hatch Indy	5–7 April	(England) Shane Byrne	(England) James Ellison	(England) Shane Byrne	Rapid Solicitors Kawasaki
1	R2	(England) Brands Hatch Indy	5–7 April		(England) James Ellison	(England) James Ellison	Milwaukee Yamaha
2	R1	(England) Thruxton	12–14 April	(England) Alex Lowes	(England) Shane Byrne	(England) Shane Byrne	Rapid Solicitors Kawasaki
2	R2	(England) Thruxton	12–14 April		(England) James Ellison	(England) Shane Byrne	Rapid Solicitors Kawasaki
3	R1	(England) Oulton Park	4–6 May	(England) Alex Lowes	(England) Alex Lowes	(England) Alex Lowes	Samsung Honda
3	R2	(England) Oulton Park	4–6 May		(England) Alex Lowes	(England) Shane Byrne	Rapid Solicitors Kawasaki
4	R1	(Scotland) Knockhill	14–16 June	(England) Shane Byrne	(England) Alex Lowes	(England) Shane Byrne	Rapid Solicitors Kawasaki
4	R2	(Scotland) Knockhill	14–16 June		(Australia) Josh Brookes	(England) Shane Byrne	Rapid Solicitors Kawasaki
5	R1	(England) Snetterton 300	5–7 July	(England) Alex Lowes	(England) Alex Lowes	(England) Alex Lowes	Samsung Honda
5	R2	(England) Snetterton 300	5–7 July		(England) Shane Byrne	(England) Shane Byrne	Rapid Solicitors Kawasaki
6	R1	(England) Brands Hatch GP	19–21 July	(England) Shane Byrne	(England) James Ellison	(Australia) Josh Brookes	Tyco Suzuki
6	R2	(England) Brands Hatch GP	19–21 July		(England) Alex Lowes	(England) Shane Byrne	Rapid Solicitors Kawasaki
7	R1	(England) Oulton Park	9–11 August	(England) Alex Lowes	(England) Shane Byrne	(England) James Ellison	Milwaukee Yamaha
7	R2	(England) Oulton Park	9–11 August		(England) Shane Byrne	(England) Shane Byrne	Rapid Solicitors Kawasaki
7	R3	(England) Oulton Park	9–11 August		(England) Alex Lowes	(Australia) Josh Brookes	Tyco Suzuki
8	R1	(England) Cadwell Park	24–26 August	(England) Alex Lowes	(England) Alex Lowes	(England) Alex Lowes	Samsung Honda
8	R2	(England) Cadwell Park	24–26 August		(Australia) Josh Brookes	(England) Alex Lowes	Samsung Honda
9	R1	(England) Donington Park	6–8 September	(England) James Westmoreland	(England) James Westmoreland	(England) Alex Lowes	Samsung Honda
9	R2	(England) Donington Park	6–8 September		(England) James Westmoreland	(England) Alex Lowes	Samsung Honda
The Showdown
10	R1	(Netherlands) TT Circuit Assen	20–22 September	(England) Alex Lowes	(England) Alex Lowes	(England) Alex Lowes	Samsung Honda
10	R2	(Netherlands) TT Circuit Assen	20–22 September		(England) James Ellison	(England) James Ellison	Milwaukee Yamaha
11	R1	(England) Silverstone Arena GP	4–6 October	(England) Alex Lowes	(England) Shane Byrne	(England) Alex Lowes	Samsung Honda
11	R2	(England) Silverstone Arena GP	4–6 October		(England) Shane Byrne	(England) Shane Byrne	Rapid Solicitors Kawasaki
12	R1	(England) Brands Hatch GP	18–20 October	(Australia) Josh Brookes	(England) Alex Lowes	(Australia) Josh Brookes	Tyco Suzuki
12	R2	(England) Brands Hatch GP	18–20 October		(Australia) Josh Brookes	(Australia) Josh Brookes	Tyco Suzuki
12	R3	(England) Brands Hatch GP	18–20 October		(England) Alex Lowes	(Australia) Josh Brookes	Tyco Suzuki

== Entry list ==
2013 Entry List
Team	Constructor	Bike	No.	Riders	Rounds
Tyco Suzuki	Suzuki	Suzuki GSX-R1000	2	(Australia) Josh Brookes	All
Tyco Suzuki	Suzuki	Suzuki GSX-R1000	99	(United States) P. J. Jacobsen	All
Tsingtao WK Bikes	Kawasaki	Kawasaki ZX-10R	3	(Australia) David Johnson	10
Tsingtao WK Bikes	Kawasaki	Kawasaki ZX-10R	43	(England) Howie Mainwaring	7–12
Lloyds British GBmoto Honda	Honda	Honda CBR1000RR	4	(England) Dan Linfoot	1, 4–12
Lloyds British GBmoto Honda	Honda	Honda CBR1000RR	33	(England) Tristan Palmer	3
Lloyds British GBmoto Honda	Honda	Honda CBR1000RR	60	(England) Peter Hickman	All
Quattro Plant Kawasaki	Kawasaki	Kawasaki ZX-10R	7	(England) Barry Burrell	7–12
Quattro Plant Kawasaki	Kawasaki	Kawasaki ZX-10R	9	(England) Chris Walker	All
Quattro Plant Kawasaki	Kawasaki	Kawasaki ZX-10R	83	(England) Danny Buchan	1–6
Buildbase BMW	BMW	BMW S1000RR	10	(England) Jon Kirkham	All
Buildbase BMW	BMW	BMW S1000RR	27	(England) James Westmoreland	All
Bathams Honda	Honda	Honda CBR1000RR	11	(England) Michael Rutter	1–9, 11–12
Bathams Honda	Honda	Honda CBR1000RR	44	(Netherlands) Danny de Boer	10–12
Bathams Honda	Honda	Honda CBR1000RR	46	(England) Tommy Bridewell	1–5
MH Kawasaki	Kawasaki	Kawasaki ZX-10R	14	(England) Michael Howarth	3–6
MH Kawasaki	Kawasaki	Kawasaki ZX-10R	43	(England) Howie Mainwaring	1–6
MH Kawasaki	Kawasaki	Kawasaki ZX-10R	51	(England) Luke Quigley	1–2
Rapido Sport Racing Ducati	Ducati	Ducati 1199 Panigale	15	(Italy) Matteo Baiocco	All
Motodex Spearmint Rhino BMW	BMW	BMW S1000RR	16	(England) Stefan Cappella	11
Motodex Spearmint Rhino BMW	BMW	BMW S1000RR	37	(Austria) David Linortner	12
Two Wheel Racing Honda	Honda	Honda CBR1000RR	20	(England) Jenny Tinmouth	All
Milwaukee Yamaha	Yamaha	Yamaha YZF-R1	21	(Australia) Josh Waters	1–9
Milwaukee Yamaha	Yamaha	Yamaha YZF-R1	46	(England) Tommy Bridewell	10–12
Milwaukee Yamaha	Yamaha	Yamaha YZF-R1	77	(England) James Ellison	All
Halsall Racing	Kawasaki	Kawasaki ZX-10R	21	(Australia) Josh Waters	11–12
Halsall Racing	Kawasaki	Kawasaki ZX-10R	39	(England) Lee Costello	All
Halsall Racing	Kawasaki	Kawasaki ZX-10R	46	(England) Tommy Bridewell	7–9
Samsung Honda	Honda	Honda CBR1000RR	22	(England) Alex Lowes	All
Samsung Honda	Honda	Honda CBR1000RR	23	(Japan) Ryuichi Kiyonari	1–10
Samsung Honda	Honda	Honda CBR1000RR	78	(France) Freddy Foray	11–12
Riders Motorcycles BMW	BMW	BMW S1000RR	40	(England) Martin Jessop	All
Rapid Solicitors Kawasaki	Kawasaki	Kawasaki ZX-10R	41	(Japan) Noriyuki Haga	10–12
Rapid Solicitors Kawasaki	Kawasaki	Kawasaki ZX-10R	67	(England) Shane Byrne	All
Rapid Solicitors Kawasaki	Kawasaki	Kawasaki ZX-10R	303	(Northern Ireland) Keith Farmer	1–9
Quelch BSD Motorsport	Kawasaki	Kawasaki ZX-10R	51	(England) Jamie Poole	7–9, 11–12
STEL Suzuki	Suzuki	Suzuki GSX-R1000	64	(England) Aaron Zanotti	All
PR Racing Kawasaki	Kawasaki	Kawasaki ZX-10R	68	(England) Karl Harris	1–4, 5–9, 11–12
Padgett's Racing	Honda	Honda CBR1000RR			
Padgett's Racing	Honda	Honda CBR1000RR	96	(Czech Republic) Jakub Smrž	All
Doodson Motorsport Honda	Honda	Honda CBR1000RR			
Doodson Motorsport Honda	Honda	Honda CBR1000RR	127	(Denmark) Robbin Harms	1–5, 10

== Championship standings ==
=== Riders' Championship ===
Pos	Rider	Bike	BRH (England)		THR (England)		OUL (England)		KNO (Scotland)		SNE (England)		BRH (England)		OUL (England)			CAD (England)		DON (England)		ASS (Netherlands)		SIL (England)		BRH (England)			Pts
Pos	Rider	Bike	R1	R2	R1	R2	R1	R2	R1	R2	R1	R2	R1	R2	R1	R2	R3	R1	R2	R1	R2	R1	R2	R1	R2	R1	R2	R3	Pts
The Championship Showdown
1	(England) Alex Lowes	Honda	2	2	**3**	2	**1**	**3**	Ret	**4**	**1**	**2**	2	3	**3**	Ret	3	**1**	**1**	1	1	**1**	**DSQ**	**1**	2	2	**Ret**	2	643
2	(England) Shane Byrne	Kawasaki	**1**	3	1	**1**	Ret	1	**1**	1	3	1	**Ret**	1	2	**1**	**2**	2	4	2	2	2	Ret	2	**1**	3	Ret	3	636
3	(Australia) Josh Brookes	Suzuki	3	5	2	4	3	2	2	2	2	3	1	4	4	2	1	3	Ret	4	5	4	Ret	Ret	5	**1**	1	**1**	621
4	(England) James Ellison	Yamaha	16	**1**	6	3	2	Ret	7	Ret	4	9	Ret	**2**	1	Ret	4	Ret	3	3	6	Ret	1	5	4	Ret	3	5	589
5	(England) James Westmoreland	BMW	Ret	9	4	9	7	Ret	6	6	6	5	4	6	22	9	6	10	9	**5**	**4**	8	5	8	9	8	4	7	564
6	(Japan) Ryuichi Kiyonari	Honda	8	4	17	Ret	14	12	3	3	5	4	3	5	6	3	10	7	5	13	11	14	3						522
BSB Riders Cup
7	(England) Jon Kirkham	BMW	4	6	5	8	4	4	Ret	8	11	Ret	6	7	8	5	9	13	10	6	7	9	4	6	7	14	8	6	213
8	(England) Tommy Bridewell	Honda	5	Ret	Ret	Ret	5	5	11	Ret	Ret	12																	197
8	(England) Tommy Bridewell	Kawasaki													5	4	5	4	2	Ret	3								197
8	(England) Tommy Bridewell	Yamaha																				3	Ret	3	3	6	Ret	4	197
9	(United States) P. J. Jacobsen	Suzuki	9	12	9	11	8	Ret	9	7	Ret	11	5	8	7	6	Ret	5	Ret	9	9	7	2	4	6	5	6	Ret	188
10	(England) Chris Walker	Kawasaki	7	8	Ret	7	9	6	5	5	Ret	6	Ret	Ret	9	Ret	12	6	6	7	8	NC	6	13	11	7	5	9	168
11	(England) Peter Hickman	Honda	12	13	11	10	6	Ret	10	9	13	13	13	13	12	12	13	8	7	11	13	12	7	7	Ret	15	Ret	12	113
12	(England) Dan Linfoot	Honda	Ret	DNS					8	12	12	8	7	9	10	7	11	11	11	15	14	Ret	9	Ret	13	12	7	10	102
13	(Australia) Josh Waters	Yamaha	10	14	Ret	16	13	10	19	Ret	9	7	14	12	14	11	15	12	8	12	12								96
13	(Australia) Josh Waters	Kawasaki																						12	12	4	Ret	8	96
14	(Northern Ireland) Keith Farmer	Kawasaki	6	10	Ret	6	Ret	8	4	13	DNS	DNS	8	10	11	8	7	9	DNS	DNS	DNS								93
15	(Czech Republic) Jakub Smrž	Honda	13	18	10	12	12	13	13	Ret	8	Ret	11	Ret	16	17	14	15	19	8	10	6	Ret	15	10	16	9	11	82
16	(England) Howie Mainwaring	Kawasaki	15	16	12	13	11	7	15	10	Ret	Ret	9	Ret	Ret	10	8	Ret	Ret	Ret	16	DNS	DNS	Ret	DNS	Ret	11	Ret	55
17	(Italy) Matteo Baiocco	Ducati	14	15	Ret	Ret	17	14	14	11	10	10	Ret	14	15	13	16	18	15	19	17	13	Ret	9	8	17	13	15	53
18	(England) Michael Rutter	Honda	Ret	Ret	8	5	Ret	Ret	12	Ret	Ret	DNS	10	11	13	18	Ret	Ret	13	14	15			16	18	10	Ret	Ret	49
19	(England) Lee Costello	Kawasaki	19	Ret	Ret	Ret	18	Ret	17	14	Ret	14	12	Ret	19	14	Ret	17	16	16	18	15	11	14	17	9	2	13	48
20	(England) Barry Burrell	Kawasaki													18	16	Ret	14	14	10	Ret	10	10	10	16	Ret	Ret	Ret	28
21	(England) Karl Harris	Kawasaki	Ret	7	7	Ret	16	Ret	DNS	DNS			15	Ret	Ret	Ret	17	16	12	Ret	Ret			18	DNS	Ret	Ret	Ret	23
22	(Denmark) Robbin Harms	Honda	11	11	15	14	Ret	DNS	16	Ret	7	Ret										17	Ret						22
23	(Japan) Noriyuki Haga	Kawasaki																				5	Ret	Ret	14	11	Ret	Ret	18
24	(France) Freddy Foray	Honda																						11	15	13	10	14	17
25	(Netherlands) Danny de Boer	Honda																				11	8	17	Ret	18	14	17	15
26	(England) Tristan Palmer	Honda					10	9																					13
27	(England) Martin Jessopp	BMW	17	19	14	15	15	11	DNS	DNS	Ret	DNS	16	15	17	15	18	Ret	17	Ret	19	16	Ret	Ret	20	20	15	18	12
28	(England) Aaron Zanotti	Suzuki	Ret	20	18	17	Ret	15	Ret	15	DNS	DNS	17	16	20	Ret	19	19	18	17	20	18	12	19	19	19	12	16	10
29	(England) Danny Buchan	Kawasaki	Ret	Ret	13	Ret	DNS	DNS	DNS	DNS	14	Ret	Ret	DNS															5
30	(England) Michael Howarth	Kawasaki					Ret	Ret	Ret	16	15	DNS	Ret	Ret															1
31	(England) Jenny Tinmouth	Honda	DNS	DNS	19	18	19	Ret	18	Ret	Ret	15	18	17	21	19	20	DNS	DNS	Ret	Ret	19	Ret	20	21	Ret	Ret	19	1
	(England) Luke Quigley	Kawasaki	18	17	16	Ret																							0
	(England) Jamie Poole	Kawasaki													DNS	Ret	21	Ret	Ret	18	Ret			21	22	DNS	Ret	Ret	0
	(Austria) David Linortner	BMW																								Ret	Ret	Ret	0
	(Australia) David Johnson	Kawasaki																				DNS	DNS						0
	(England) Stefan Cappella	BMW																						DNS	DNS				0
Pos	Rider	Bike	BRH (England)		THR (England)		OUL (England)		KNO (Scotland)		SNE (England)		BRH (England)		OUL (England)			CAD (England)		DON (England)		ASS (Netherlands)		SIL (England)		BRH (England)			Pts

Colour	Result
Gold	Winner
Silver	Second place
Bronze	Third place
Green	Points classification
Blue	Non-points classification
Blue	Non-classified finish (NC)
Purple	Retired, not classified (Ret)
Red	Did not qualify (DNQ)
Red	Did not pre-qualify (DNPQ)
Black	Disqualified (DSQ)
White	Did not start (DNS)
White	Withdrew (WD)
White	Race cancelled (C)
Blank	Did not practice (DNP)
Blank	Did not arrive (DNA)
Blank	Excluded (EX)

**Bold** – Pole
Italics – Fastest Lap
