= Filip Backlund =

Swedish motorcycle racer

- Nationality: Swedish
- Born: 14 April 1990 (age 36); Västerås, Västmanland, Sweden
- Current team: Quattro Plant Cool Kawasaki
- Bike number: 99
- Website: filipbacklund.se

Jan Filip Backlund (born 14 April 1990 in Västerås, Västmanland) is a Swedish motorcycle road racer. Nicknamed ‘The Teacher', he currently competes in the British Superbike Championship for Quattro Plant Cool Kawasaki.

== Career ==
Backlund began riding motorcycles at the age of three, when his father bought him a Honda 50cc bike. He began competing in motocross at seven years old, riding in the 60cc class.

In 2001, after five years in motocross, Backlund stopped racing in the series as his parents felt it was too dangerous. After attempting different forms of motorsport and motorcycling, at the age of 12, he fell in love with Mini Moto and began to race all over Europe with his brother.

At 13 years of age, Backlund was granted an exemption to race 125cc bikes in Scandinavia and that year became the first rider of that age to win the championship. He followed this up in 250cc in 2004 and again won the title on his first attempt.

Suzuki then invited Backlund to ride in the Superstock 600cc Veidec Trophy in Scandinavia, where he took two wins in two years of competition.

From 2007, Backlund competed in 1000cc Superbikes, competing in the FIM Superstock Youth World Championship in 2008, before winning two gold medals in the Swedish Championships in 2009 and 2011. He also has raced in Endurance WC races and German IDM Superbikes.

In 2012, Backlund moved to the United Kingdom and entered the National Superstock 1000 Championship. He competed in the series for two seasons, finishing third in 2013. Since 2014, Backlund has ridden in the British Superbike Championship, starting with four rounds that year and then full programmes in 2015 & 2016 for Kawasaki.

Before the 2016 campaign, Backlund fell while testing for the new season at Donington Park and broke his collarbone.

== Personal ==
Backlund now resides in Burton-upon-Trent, Staffordshire in the United Kingdom where he lives with his girlfriend and their cat Felicia. He runs a successful racing school across Europe and enjoys cycling. He is also interested in art, music, cooking and interior design.

== Racing record ==
2006 - 36th, European Superstock 600 Championship, Suzuki GSX-R600
2008 - 24th, FIM Superstock 1000 Cup, Suzuki GSX-R1000
2013 - 24th, FIM Superstock 1000 Cup, Kawasaki ZX-10R

=== Career summary ===
Year	Championship	Races	Wins	Podiums	Pts.	Pos.
2008	Superstock 1000	10	0	0	13	24th
2009	Pro Superbike STCC	8	3	6	144	1st
2011	Pro Superbike Sweden	13	10	10	278	1st
2013	National Superstock 1000	11	1	4	136	3rd
2014	National Superstock 1000	7	0	2	88	7th
2014	British Superbikes	9	0	0	21	25th
2015	British Superbikes	24	0	0	19	26th
2016	British Superbikes	26	0	0	2	30th

=== European Superstock 600 ===
==== Races by year ====
(key) (Races in bold indicate pole position, races in italics indicate fastest lap)

Year	Bike	1	2	3	4	5	6	7	8	9	10	Pos	Pts
2006	Honda	VAL	MNZ	SIL	MIS	BRN; 14	BRA	ASS	LAU	IMO	MAG	36th	2

=== FIM Superstock 1000 Cup ===
==== Races by year ====
(key) (Races in bold indicate pole position) (Races in italics indicate fastest lap)

Year	Bike	1	2	3	4	5	6	7	8	9	10	Pos	Pts
2008	Suzuki	VAL; 18	NED; 22	MNZ; 13	NŰR; 19	SMR; 22	BRN; 29	BRA; 19	DON; 8	MAG; 19	ALG; 14	24th	13
2013	Kawasaki	ARA	NED	MNZ	ALG	IMO	SIL; 10	SIL; Ret	NŰR	MAG	JER	24th	6

==== British Superbike Championship ====
Year	Make	1		2		3		4		5		6		7			8		9			10		11		12			Pos	Pts
Year	Make	R1	R2	R1	R2	R1	R2	R1	R2	R1	R2	R1	R2	R1	R2	R3	R1	R2	R1	R2	R3	R1	R2	R1	R2	R1	R2	R3	Pos	Pts
2014	Yamaha	**BHI**	**BHI**	**OUL**	**OUL**	**SNE**	**SNE**	**KNO**	**KNO**	**BHGP**	**BHGP**	**THR**	**THR**	**OUL**	**OUL**	**OUL**	**CAD**	**CAD**	**DON**; 17	**DON**; 15		**ASS**; Ret	**ASS**; 9	**SIL**; 13	**SIL**; 11	**BHGP**; Ret	**BHGP**; 15	**BHGP**; 13	**25th**	**21**
2015	Kawasaki	**DON**; 17	**DON**; Ret	**BHI**; Ret	**BHI**; 22	**OUL**; Ret	**OUL**; 16	**SNE**; Ret	**SNE**; 8	**KNO**; Ret	**KNO**; Ret	**BHGP**; 15	**BHGP**; 15	**THR**; 11	**THR**; 14		**CAD**; 18	**CAD**; 16	**OUL**; 13	**OUL**; 16	**OUL**; 18	**ASS**; 18	**ASS**; 20	**SIL**; 18	**SIL**; 19	**BHGP**; 20	**BHGP**; 17	**BHGP**; 17	**26th**	**19**
2016	Kawasaki	**SIL**; DNS	**SIL**; DNS	**OUL**; 20	**OUL**; 17	**BHI**; 18	**BHI**; 17	**KNO**; 19	**KNO**; Ret	**SNE**; 15	**SNE**; 18	**THR**; 15	**THR**; 18	**BHGP**; Ret	**BHGP**; DNS		**CAD**; 18	**CAD**; Ret	**OUL**; 19	**OUL**; 19	**OUL**; 20	**DON**; Ret	**DON**; Ret	**ASS**; 23	**ASS**; 25	**BHGP**; Ret	**BHGP**; DNS	**BHGP**; DNS	**30th**	**2**
