= Tommy Bridewell =

English motorcycle racer (born 1988)

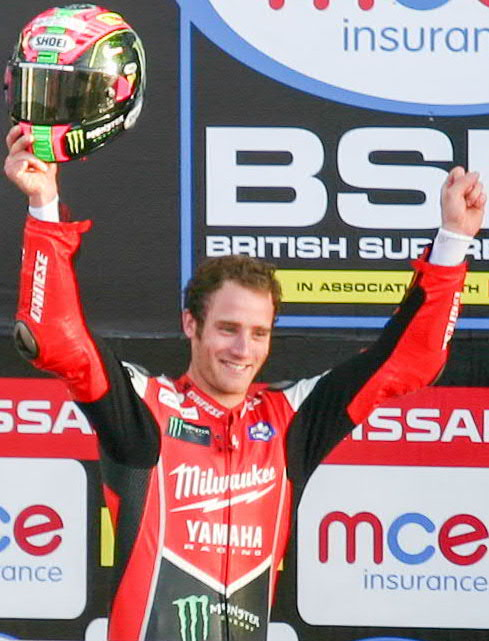
- Bridewell wearing Milwaukee Yamaha colours acknowledging spectators' plaudits for his overall Championship third-place at Brands Hatch Showdown podium, end of BSB 2014 season
- Nationality: British
- Born: 6 August 1988 (age 38); Etchilhampton, Wiltshire, England, UK
- Current team: Honda Racing UK
- Bike number: 46
Motorcycle racing career statistics
Superbike World Championship
Active years	2019, 2024–
Manufacturers	Ducati, Honda
Championships	0
2025 championship position	33rd (0 pts)
Starts / Wins / Podiums / Poles / F. laps / Points; 49 / 0 / 0 / 0 / 0 / 95
British Superbike Championship
Active years	2007, 2009–
Manufacturers	Suzuki, Honda, Yamaha, BMW, Kawasaki, Ducati
Championships	1 (2023)
2024 championship position	2nd (486 pts)
Starts / Wins / Podiums / Poles / F. laps / Points; 448 / 19 / 109 / 30 / 42 / 6928

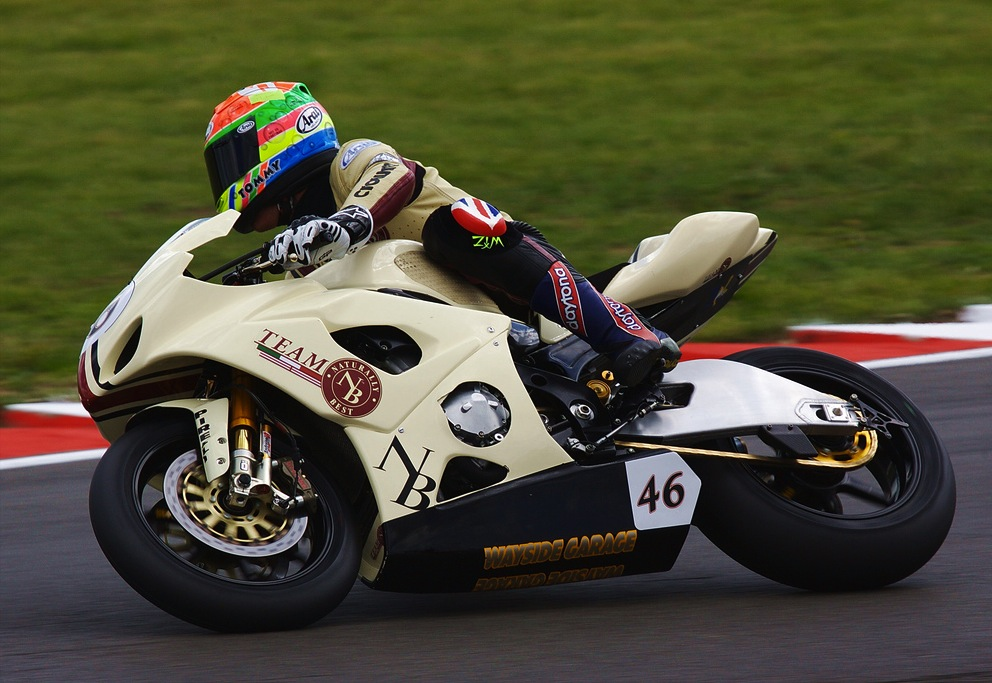
Bridewell at a 2009 BSB race at Snetterton

Thomas George Bridewell (born 8 August 1988 in Etchilhampton, Wiltshire) races for Honda Racing UK in the British Superbike Championship.

Bridewell is a Superbike Champion in the 2023 British Superbike Championship aboard a Ducati Panigale V4 R. After several seasons with Oxford Products in the British Superbike Championship, for 2023 he switched to Paul Bird Racing on a factory-supported Ducati.

During the 2018 season, while competing on a Suzuki GSX-R1000R, Bridewell's contract was terminated abruptly by his team during practice for the Snetterton Circuit round in June. However, in July, after missing two rounds, Bridewell was able to step into the vacant Ducati Panigale seat at Moto Rapido Racing, caused by Taylor Mackenzie leaving earlier by mutual agreement.

For the remainder of 2018, Bridewell returned the team's best results in the Superbike class, scoring four podium finishes, narrowly missing out on a Showdown place and achieving the Riders' Cup at the season finale. Bridewell was retained from 2019 to 2022 with the same team under a new sponsor name.

Prior to winning the 2023 British Superbike Championship, Bridewell's best season-result was finishing second in the 2021 BSB series, behind winner Tarran Mackenzie.

Earlier in his racing career, Bridewell had also been a runner-up in the Yamaha R6 Cup of 2005.

Bridewell is the younger brother of Ollie Bridewell, who was a prominent up-and-coming motorcycle racer when he died in 2007 during the Mallory Park round of the Superbike Championship.

== Biography ==
=== Ollie's death ===
For the 2007 season, Bridewell and his older brother Ollie joined forces for the British Superbike Championship in team NB Suzuki. Ollie died after crashing during a practice session at the Mallory Park round in 2007. He was pronounced dead at the scene. Bridewell left the Championship at that round.

=== European Superstock 600 ===
Bridewell restarted his racing career in Italy during 2008, moving on to the European Superstock 600 class in 2009, riding the Lorenzini Yamaha. Bridewell started off with a 13th place in the first round at Valencia but would fail to score any more points finishes, and left the team mid-season.

=== Return to British Superbike Championship ===
==== 2009 ====
After departing the European scene, Bridewell returned to the British Superbike Championship during the 2009 season, competing in the Privateers' Cup on a Team NB Suzuki, winning the Cup class in seven of the 26 races. Following this success, he was signed by Quay Garage Honda to compete in the main British Superbike Championship for the 2010 season.

==== 2010 ====
Bridewell had a mixed start to the season, crashing twice in the first round at Brands Hatch Indy circuit, then failing to start the next round at Thruxton. He recovered from this to score a career best fourth-place finish during the fourth round at Cadwell Park. Bridewell finished the season in 11th place on 105 points, his best finish in the Championship.

==== 2011 ====
For 2011, Bridewell remained with the Quay Garage team, rebranded under the Tyco Racing banner. His season started strongly with a podium in the first race at Brands Hatch Indy. However, he crashed heavily in practice at Thruxton, leading to the amputation of his little finger. He took a fourth place in race 2 at Cadwell Park, having injured himself in practice for the second round at Oulton Park, and never showed in the top-ten again. On the Wednesday before the Snetterton round, Bridewell and Tyco Honda parted company. Bridewell was signed up to replace James Westmoreland at Motorpoint Yamaha for the last four rounds of the 2011 championship season.

== British Superbikes ==
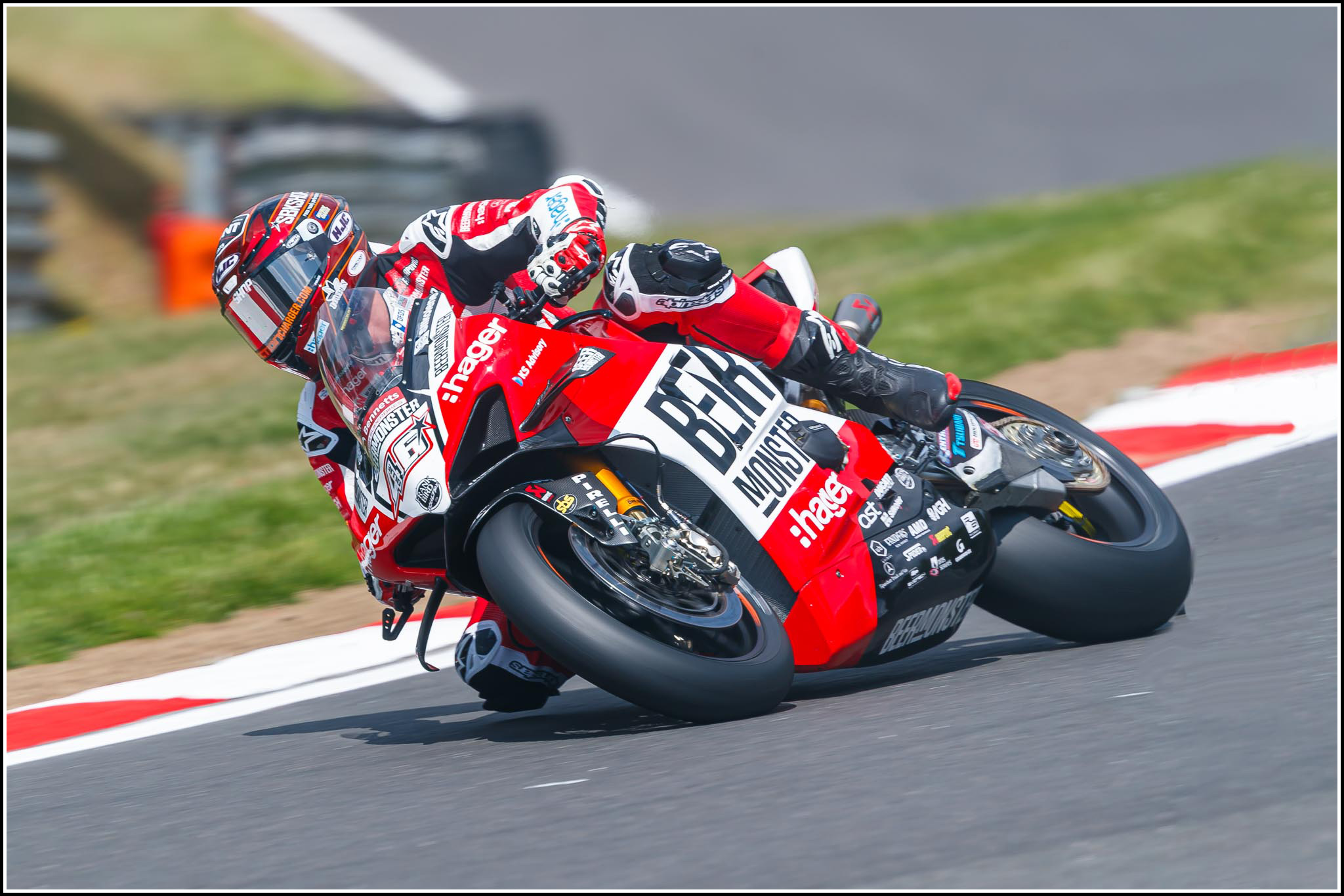
Bridewell riding for BeerMonster Ducati at Brands Hatch in 2023

Bridewell rode with Shaun Muir Racing as a temporary replacement rider for part of 2013, followed by a full season in 2014. For 2015, he joined Tyco BMW.

=== 2024 ===
After winning the 2023 BSB championship, in late December 2023 Bridewell confirmed he would leave PBM racing to join Honda Racing UK, a factory supported team based in Louth, Lincolnshire, England which will run Honda Fireblades along with two other riders, Andrew Irwin and Dean Harrison.

2025

In 2025 Bridewell finished 5th overall at Cadwell Park.

== Endurance racing ==
Bridewell participated in the 2018 Suzuka 8 Hours solo motorcycle endurance race riding a Suzuki GSX-R1000R for Japanese team S-Pulse Dream Racing IAI. With two other riders, the team finished fourth.

== World Superbikes ==
=== 2019 ===
Bridewell was drafted in to replace injured rider Eugene Laverty on the Go Eleven Ducati in May 2019 for the races at Imola, Italy, on a similar bike to his BSB machine. He finished 12th in Race 1, scoring four World Championship points, and 11th in the sprint-distance Superpole Race, just outside of the points. Race 2 was cancelled due to heavy rain. In late May, it was confirmed Bridewell would again replace Laverty, at the Jerez, Spain event in June, when he again finished in the points from both full-length races.

=== 2024 ===
Bridewell was entered as a wildcard in the last round of the 2024 season at Jerez, Spain, on his BSB-based Honda Fireblade, crashing in both full-length races, and finishing the shorter Superpole event in 20th place.

== Career statistics ==
Stats correct as of 27 October 2024

Colour	Result
Gold	Winner
Silver	Second place
Bronze	Third place
Green	Points classification
Blue	Non-points classification
Blue	Non-classified finish (NC)
Purple	Retired, not classified (Ret)
Red	Did not qualify (DNQ)
Red	Did not pre-qualify (DNPQ)
Black	Disqualified (DSQ)
White	Did not start (DNS)
White	Withdrew (WD)
White	Race cancelled (C)
Blank	Did not practice (DNP)
Blank	Did not arrive (DNA)
Blank	Excluded (EX)

=== By class ===
- 2009 – 34th, FIM Superstock 1000 Cup, Yamaha YZF-R1
- 2010 – NC, FIM Superstock 1000 Cup, Honda CBR1000RR

=== FIM Superstock 1000 Cup ===
==== Races by year ====
(key) (Races in bold indicate pole position) (Races in italics indicate fastest lap)

Year	Bike	1	2	3	4	5	6	7	8	9	10	Pos	Pts
2009	Yamaha	VAL; 13	NED; 20	MNZ; 19	SMR	DON	BRN	NŰR	IMO	MAG	ALG	34th	3
2010	Honda	ALG	VAL	NED	MNZ	SMR	BRN	SIL	NŰR	IMO	MAG; DNS	NC	0

==== British Superbike Championship ====
Year	Bike	1		2		3			4		5		6			7			8			9			10		11		12			13		Pos	Pts	Ref
Year	Bike	R1	R2	R1	R2	R1	R2	R3	R1	R2	R1	R2	R1	R2	R3	R1	R2	R3	R1	R2	R3	R1	R2	R3	R1	R2	R1	R2	R1	R2	R3	R1	R2	Pos	Pts	Ref
2007	Suzuki	BHGP; 12	BHGP; Ret	THR; 15	THR; Ret	SIL; 12	SIL; 10		OUL; 14	OUL; 12	SNE; 10	SNE; Ret	MON; Ret	MON; DNS		KNO; 20	KNO; 17		OUL; DNS	OUL; DNS		MAL	MAL		CRO	CRO	CAD	CAD	DON; 18	DON; 19		BHI; 15	BHI; 21	19th	28	
2009	Suzuki	BHI	BHI	OUL	OUL	DON	DON		THR	THR	SNE; 15	SNE; 20	KNO; 9	KNO; 9		MAL; 11	MAL; DNS		BHGP; Ret	BHGP; Ret	BHGP; DNS	CAD; 13	CAD; 10		CRO; 12	CRO; 14	SIL; 12	SIL; 12	OUL; 15	OUL; 11	OUL; 9			18th	56	
2010	Honda	BHI; Ret	BHI; Ret	THR; DNS	THR; DNS	OUL; 10	OUL; 7		CAD; 4	CAD; 6	MAL; 11	MAL; 9	KNO; Ret	KNO; C		SNE; 10	SNE; 6	SNE; Ret	BHGP; 12	BHGP; Ret	BHGP; 12	CAD; DSQ	CAD; 8		CRO; Ret	CRO; 7	SIL; Ret	SIL; 12	OUL; 6	OUL; DNS	OUL; DNS			11th	105	
2011	Honda	BHI; 3	BHI; Ret	OUL; WD	OUL; WD	CRO; 10	CRO; 10		THR; Ret	THR; 17	KNO; 11	KNO; Ret	SNE	SNE		OUL	OUL		BHGP	BHGP	BHGP													17th	76	
2011	Yamaha																					CAD; DNS	CAD; Ret	CAD; 11	DON; 14	DON; 11	SIL; 10	SIL; 9	BHGP; 11	BHGP; 7	BHGP; 12			17th	76	
2012	BMW	BHI; 6	BHI; C	THR; 6	THR; 16	OUL; 5	OUL; 7	OUL; 5	SNE; 6	SNE; Ret	KNO; 5	KNO; 6	OUL; 6	OUL; 7	OUL; 8	BHGP; 5	BHGP; 7		CAD; 9	CAD; 5		DON; 9	DON; 4		ASS; 6	ASS; 5	SIL; 6	SIL; 4	BHGP; 7	BHGP; 5	BHGP; 4			6th	577	
2013	Honda	BHI; 5	BHI; Ret	THR; Ret	THR; Ret	OUL; 5	OUL; 5		KNO; 11	KNO; DNS	SNE; Ret	SNE; 12	BHGP	BHGP																				8th	197	
2013	Kawasaki															OUL; 5	OUL; 4	OUL; 5	CAD; 4	CAD; 2		DON; Ret	DON; 3											8th	197	
2013	Yamaha																								ASS; 3	ASS; Ret	SIL; 3	SIL; 3	BHGP; 6	BHGP; Ret	BHGP; 4			8th	197	
2014	Yamaha	BHI; 7	BHI; 9	OUL; 4	OUL; 5	SNE; 4	SNE; 3		KNO; 6	KNO; 7	BHGP; Ret	BHGP; 4	THR; 5	THR; Ret		OUL; 4	OUL; 7	OUL; 8	CAD; 1	CAD; 3		DON; 3	DON; Ret		ASS; 9	ASS; 3	SIL; 10	SIL; 4	BHGP; 5	BHGP; 6	BHGP; 3			3rd	587	
2015	BMW	DON; 6	DON; 8	BHI; Ret	BHI; 6	OUL; 1	OUL; Ret		SNE; 4	SNE; 5	KNO; 7	KNO; Ret	BHGP; 4	BHGP; Ret		THR; Ret	THR; 4		CAD; 4	CAD; 3		OUL; Ret	OUL; Ret	OUL; 3	ASS; 8	ASS; Ret	SIL; 9	SIL; 7	BHGP; 11	BHGP; 11	BHGP; 12			6th	545	
2016	Suzuki	SIL; 10	SIL; 16	OUL; 15	OUL; 14	BHI; 3	BHI; 4		KNO; 12	KNO; 8	SNE; 8	SNE; 10	THR; 4	THR; 8		BHGP; Ret	BHGP; Ret		CAD; 4	CAD; 5		OUL; Ret	OUL; 6	OUL; 3	DON; Ret	DON; 6	ASS; 17	ASS; 16	BHGP; 5	BHGP; 8	BHGP; 8			11th	172	
2017	Kawasaki	DON; 12	DON; 11	BHI; 11	BHI; 12	OUL; 11	OUL; 8		KNO; 11	KNO; 15	SNE; 14	SNE; 14	BHGP; 14	BHGP; 12		THR; 16	THR; 14		CAD; 9	CAD; 6		SIL; Ret	SIL; 11	SIL; Ret	OUL; Ret	OUL; Ret	ASS; 15	ASS; 18	BHGP; 11	BHGP; 11	BHGP; 15			17th	83	
2018	Suzuki	DON; Ret	DON; 14	BHI; 9	BHI; 8	OUL; 8	OUL; 10		SNE	SNE	KNO	KNO																						7th	178	
2018	Ducati												BHGP; 12	BHGP; 7		THR; 11	THR; 7		CAD; 5	CAD; Ret		SIL; 10	SIL; 6	SIL; 9	OUL; 2	OUL; 3	ASS; 6	ASS; Ret	BHGP; Ret	BHGP; 2	BHGP; 2			7th	178	
2019	Ducati	SIL; 5	SIL; 4	OUL; 2	OUL; 2	DON; 4	DON; 3	DON; 3	BHGP; 3	BHGP; 2	KNO; 5	KNO; 3	SNE; Ret	SNE; 3		THR; 8	THR; 5		CAD; 3	CAD; 2		OUL; Ret	OUL; 3	OUL; 1	ASS; Ret	ASS; 2	DON; 2	DON; 3	BHGP; 2	BHGP; 3	BHGP; 2			3rd	636	

Year	Bike	1			2			3			4			5			6			7			8				9			10			11			Pos	Pts	Ref
Year	Bike	R1	R2	R3	R1	R2	R3	R1	R2	R3	R1	R2	R3	R1	R2	R3	R1	R2	R3	R1	R2	R3	R1	R2	R3	R4	R1	R2	R3	R1	R2	R3	R1	R2	R3	Pos	Pts	Ref
2020	Ducati	DON; 5	DON; 9	DON; 1	SNE; 3	SNE; 3	SNE; 2	SIL; 10	SIL; 6	SIL; 5	OUL; 14	OUL; 11	OUL; 11	DON; 15	DON; 5	DON; Ret	BHGP; 9	BHGP; 10	BHGP; 7																	7th	168	
2021	Ducati	OUL; 3	OUL; Ret	OUL; 3	KNO; 8	KNO; 5	KNO; 7	BHGP; 2	BHGP; 2	BHGP; Ret	THR; 10	THR; 12	THR; Ret	DON; 5	DON; 5	DON; 1	CAD; 3	CAD; 3	CAD; 3	SNE; 2	SNE; 3	SNE; 2	SIL; 3	SIL; 5	SIL; 5		OUL; 6	OUL; 1	OUL; 1	DON; Ret	DON; 7	DON; 4	BHGP; 2	BHGP; 2	BHGP; 2	2nd	1166	
2022	Ducati	SIL; 7	SIL; 8	SIL; 7	OUL; 6	OUL; Ret	OUL; 2	DON; 8	DON; Ret	DON; Ret	KNO; 8	KNO; 5	KNO; 5	BRH; 3	BRH; 3	BRH; 5	THR; 10	THR; 10	THR; 7	CAD; 5	CAD; 3	CAD; 3	SNE; 19	SNE; 3	SNE; 7		OUL; 2	OUL; 2	OUL; 1	DON; 8	DON; 6	DON; 4	BRH; 4	BRH; 5	BRH; 4	3rd	1141	
2023	Ducati	SIL; 2	SIL; 2	SIL; 3	OUL; 5	OUL; 1	OUL; 4	DON; 2	DON; Ret	DON; 2	KNO; 4	KNO; 2	KNO; 2	SNE; 1	SNE; 1	SNE; 1	BRH; 11	BRH; 1	BRH; 1	THR; 14	THR; 14	THR; 15	CAD; 5	CAD; 5	CAD; 1		OUL; 4	OUL; 6	OUL; 1	DON; 24	DON; Ret	DON; 9	BRH; 3	BRH; 2	BRH; 2	1st	455	
2024	Honda	NAV; 7	NAV; Ret		OUL; 4	OUL; 2	OUL; 6	DON; 2	DON; 3	DON; 2	KNO; 1	KNO; 3	KNO; 2	SNE; Ret	SNE; 2	SNE; 2	BRH; 2	BRH; 2	BRH; 4	THR; 4	THR; 7	THR; 6	CAD; 4	CAD; 1	CAD; 2		OUL; Ret	OUL; 4	OUL; 2	DON; 2	DON; 2	DON; 5	BRH; 3	BRH; 1	BRH; 2	2nd	486	
2025	Honda	OUL; 6	OUL; 10	OUL; C	DON; Ret	DON; 8	DON; 7	SNE; 3	SNE; 3	SNE; 4	KNO; 5	KNO; 3	KNO; 13	BRH; 6	BRH; Ret	BRH; WD	THR; 4	THR; 11	THR; 10	CAD; Ret	CAD; 1	CAD; 3	DON; 7	DON; 8	DON; 7	DON; 8	ASS; Ret	ASS; 4	ASS; 4	OUL; 6	OUL; 6	OUL; 9	BRH; Ret	BRH; 7	BRH; 3	5th	317	

==== Superbike World Championship ====
Year	Bike	1			2			3			4			5			6			7			8			9			10			11			12			13			Pos.	Pts
Year	Bike	R1	SR	R2	R1	SR	R2	R1	SR	R2	R1	SR	R2	R1	SR	R2	R1	SR	R2	R1	SR	R2	R1	SR	R2	R1	SR	R2	R1	SR	R2	R1	SR	R2	R1	SR	R2	R1	SR	R2	Pos.	Pts
2019	Ducati	AUS	AUS	AUS	THA	THA	THA	SPA	SPA	SPA	NED	NED	NED	ITA; 12	ITA; 11	ITA; C	SPA; 14	SPA; 12	SPA; 10	ITA	ITA	ITA	GBR	GBR	GBR	USA	USA	USA	POR	POR	POR	FRA	FRA	FRA	ARG	ARG	ARG	QAT	QAT	QAT	22nd	12
2024	Honda	AUS	AUS	AUS	SPA	SPA	SPA	NED	NED	NED	ITA	ITA	ITA	GBR	GBR	GBR	CZE	CZE	CZE	POR	POR	POR	FRA	FRA	FRA	ITA; 18	ITA; 21	ITA; DNS	SPA	SPA	SPA	POR	POR	POR	SPA; Ret	SPA; 20	SPA; Ret				35th	0
2025	Honda	AUS	AUS	AUS	POR	POR	POR	NED	NED	NED	ITA	ITA	ITA	CZE	CZE	CZE	EMI	EMI	EMI	GBR; Ret	GBR; 18	GBR; Ret	HUN	HUN	HUN	FRA	FRA	FRA	ARA; 19	ARA; 18	ARA; 18	POR	POR	POR	SPA	SPA	SPA				33rd	0
2026	Ducati	AUS	AUS	AUS	POR; Ret	POR; 19	POR; 13	NED; 13	NED; 15	NED; 16	HUN; 14	HUN; 12	HUN; Ret	CZE; 13	CZE; 8	CZE; 10	ARA; 5	ARA; 7	ARA; 9	EMI; 13	EMI; Ret	EMI; 14	GBR; 5	GBR; 7	GBR; Ret	FRA; Ret	FRA; 6	FRA; Ret	ITA; Ret	ITA; 7	ITA; Ret	POR; 17	POR; 12	POR; 11	SPA; 9	SPA; 10	SPA; 11				14th	83

=== FIM Endurance World Championship ===
==== By team ====
Year	Team	Bike	Rider	TC
2014	Yamaha Austria Racing Team	Yamaha YZF-R1	(Australia) Broc Parkes (United Kingdom) Michael Laverty (Slovenia) Igor Jerman (South Africa) Sheridan Morais (Australia) Ricky Olson (Australia) Wayne Maxwell (United Kingdom) Tommy Bridewell	6th
