= 2000 British Superbike Championship =

British Superbike Championship

The 2000 British Superbike season was the 13th British Superbike Championship season. Neil Hodgson became the 2000 British Superbike Champion on an INS GSE Racing Ducati 996. The Privateers' Cup was won by Dave Heal on a Kawasaki.

== Calendar ==
2000 British Superbike Championship Calendar
Round		Circuit	Date	Pole position	Fastest lap	Winning rider	Winning team	Ref
1	R1	(England) Brands Hatch Indy	26 March	(Scotland) Steve Hislop	(England) James Haydon	(England) John Reynolds	Revé Red Bull Ducati	
1	R2	(England) Brands Hatch Indy	26 March	(Scotland) Steve Hislop	(England) John Reynolds	(England) James Haydon	Revé Red Bull Ducati	
2	R1	(England) Donington Park	9 April	(Scotland) Steve Hislop	(England) James Haydon	(England) John Reynolds	Revé Red Bull Ducati	
2	R2	(England) Donington Park	9 April	(Scotland) Steve Hislop	(England) Chris Walker	(England) Chris Walker	Team Crescent Suzuki	
3	R1	(England) Thruxton	24 April	(Scotland) John Crawford	(Scotland) Steve Hislop	(England) James Haydon	Revé Red Bull Ducati	
3	R2	(England) Thruxton	24 April	(Scotland) John Crawford	(Scotland) Steve Hislop	(England) Neil Hodgson	INS GSE Racing Ducati	
4	R1	(England) Oulton Park	21 May	(England) John Reynolds	(England) Neil Hodgson	(England) Neil Hodgson	INS GSE Racing Ducati	
4	R2	(England) Oulton Park	21 May	(England) John Reynolds	(Scotland) Steve Hislop	(England) John Reynolds	Revé Red Bull Ducati	
5	R1	(England) Snetterton	25 June	(England) Neil Hodgson	(England) Chris Walker	(England) Chris Walker	Team Crescent Suzuki	
5	R2	(England) Snetterton	25 June	(England) Neil Hodgson	(England) John Reynolds	(England) John Reynolds	Revé Red Bull Ducati	
6	R1	(England) Silverstone International	2 July	(England) Neil Hodgson	(England) Neil Hodgson	(England) Neil Hodgson	INS GSE Racing Ducati	
6	R2	(England) Silverstone International	2 July	(England) Neil Hodgson	(Scotland) Steve Hislop	(England) Chris Walker	Team Crescent Suzuki	
7	R1	(England) Oulton Park	16 July	(England) Neil Hodgson	(England) Neil Hodgson	(England) Neil Hodgson	INS GSE Racing Ducati	
7	R2	(England) Oulton Park	16 July	(England) Neil Hodgson	(Scotland) Steve Hislop	(England) Chris Walker	Team Crescent Suzuki	
8	R1	(Scotland) Knockhill	13 August	(Scotland) Niall Mackenzie	(Scotland) Niall Mackenzie	(England) Chris Walker	Team Crescent Suzuki	
8	R2	(Scotland) Knockhill	13 August	(Scotland) Niall Mackenzie	(England) Chris Walker	(England) Chris Walker	Team Crescent Suzuki	
9	R1	(England) Cadwell Park	28 August	(England) Neil Hodgson	(England) John Reynolds	(England) Neil Hodgson	INS GSE Racing Ducati	
9	R2	(England) Cadwell Park	28 August	(England) Neil Hodgson	(England) John Reynolds	(England) Chris Walker	Team Crescent Suzuki	
10	R1	(England) Mallory Park	17 September	(England) Neil Hodgson	(England) Chris Walker	(England) Neil Hodgson	INS GSE Racing Ducati	
10	R2	(England) Mallory Park	17 September	(England) Neil Hodgson	(England) James Haydon	(England) Chris Walker	Team Crescent Suzuki	
11	R1	(England) Brands Hatch GP	24 September	(England) Chris Walker	(England) John Reynolds	(England) Michael Rutter	Level3 Yamaha	
11	R2	(England) Brands Hatch GP	24 September	(England) Chris Walker	(Australia) Anthony Gobert	(England) Chris Walker	Team Crescent Suzuki	
12	R1	(England) Donington Park	8 October	(England) Chris Walker	(England) John Reynolds	(England) Neil Hodgson	INS GSE Racing Ducati	
12	R2	(England) Donington Park	8 October	(England) Chris Walker	(England) James Haydon	(England) James Haydon	Revé Red Bull Ducati	

== Entry list ==
2000 British Superbike Championshio Entry List
Team	Constructor	No.	Rider	Class	Rounds
National Tyres / Clarion Suzuki	Suzuki	2	(England) Chris Walker		All
National Tyres / Clarion Suzuki	Suzuki	11	(Scotland) John Crawford		All
Revé Racing Red Bull Ducati	Ducati	3	(England) John Reynolds		All
Revé Racing Red Bull Ducati	Ducati	5	(England) James Haydon		All
INS GSE Racing Ducati	Ducati	4	(England) Neil Hodgson		All
INS GSE Racing Ducati	Ducati	7	(Scotland) Niall Mackenzie		All
Harris Honda Britain	Honda	6	(England) Sean Emmett		1–3, 5–12
Harris Honda Britain	Honda	16	(England) Shane Byrne		1–4, 9–12
Harris Honda Britain	Honda	16	(England) Rob Frost		6–7
Team Virgin Mobile Yamaha	Yamaha	8	(Scotland) Steve Hislop		1–7
Team Virgin Mobile Yamaha	Yamaha	9	(England) Paul Brown		1–8
Team Virgin Mobile Yamaha	Yamaha	9	(England) David Jefferies		9–12
Team Virgin Mobile Yamaha	Yamaha	95	(Australia) Anthony Gobert		10–12
Travel City Direct	Kawasaki	12	(Wales) Paul A. Jones		1–9, 11–12
GR Motorsport	Yamaha	13	(England) Dan Harris		4, 6
GR Motorsport	Yamaha	15	(England) Karl Harris		4
Performance House Concentric Yamaha	Yamaha	15	(England) Karl Harris		11–12
Performance House Concentric Yamaha	Yamaha	56	(England) John Crockford		1–10, 12
Team NBNR Mongoose Exhausts	Yamaha	18	(England) Nigel Nottingham		All
D&B Racing Bradgate	Honda	19	(England) Dean Ellison		2, 4–5, 7–12
Wheelclean International	Ducati	20	(England) Neil Cray		4
Team Kawasaki	Kawasaki	22	(England) Steve Plater		1–6, 8–12
Team Kawasaki	Kawasaki	24	(Australia) Peter Goddard		1–4
Team Kawasaki	Kawasaki	24	(Australia) Martin Craggill		5–7, 10
Team Kawasaki	Kawasaki	39	(Italy) Alessandro Gramigni		12
PRF Race Kits	Kawasaki	23	(England) Carl Rennie		1–4, 7–8, 11–12
T3 Racing	Yamaha	25	(England) Roger Smith		2, 4–5
T3 Racing	Yamaha	25	(France) Bernard Cazade		12
T3 Racing	Yamaha	55	(England) Francis Williamson		1–7, 11–12
T3 Racing	Yamaha	55	(England) Paul Jones		9
T3 Racing	Yamaha	50	(England) Paul Jones		12
Genesis Rider Training	Yamaha	26	(England) Dave Wood	C	All
Len Anderson Racing	Kawasaki	29	(England) Jim Hodson	C	1–2, 5, 7
R&FH Racing	Kawasaki	30	(England) Lee Humphries	C	2–6, 9. 11–12
Level3 Yamaha	Yamaha	31	(England) Michael Rutter		All
Level3 Yamaha	Yamaha	96	(Australia) Paul Young		1–11
Team Ace Performance	Yamaha	33	(England) Nicol Robb	C	4–8, 11–12
Aberdeen Drilling School	Honda	34	(Scotland) Kris Wilson	C	1–6
Team Carrera Racing	Kawasaki	35	(England) Dave Redgate	C	1–7, 9, 11–12
Hawk Racing	Kawasaki	36	(England) Gordon Blackley		All
Demon Vimto Racing Honda	Honda	52	(England) James Toseland		1–7
Demon Vimto Racing Honda	Honda	52	(United States) Tom Kipp		8–12
Clifford James Footwear	Yamaha	69	(England) Steve Marks	C	1–4, 6–12
Myco Motorsport Revolution UK GT Motorcycles	Kawasaki	77	(England) Brett Sampson	C	1–8
Myco Motorsport twistgrip.net	Kawasaki	99	(England) Dave Heal	C	All
Myco Motorsport twistgrip.net	Kawasaki	66	(Australia) Paul Free	C	10–12
Team Phoenix	Suzuki	88	(England) Colin Hipwell	C	All

Icon	Class
C	Privateers Cup

Key
Regular Rider
Wildcard Rider
Replacement Rider

== Championship Standings ==
Points system
Position	1st	2nd	3rd	4th	5th	6th	7th	8th	9th	10th	11th	12th	13th	14th	15th
Race	25	20	16	13	11	10	9	8	7	6	5	4	3	2	1

=== Riders' Championship ===
2000 British Superbike Riders' Championship
Pos	Rider	Bike	BRH (England)		DON (England)		THR (England)		OUL (England)		SNE (England)		SIL (England)		OUL (England)		KNO (Scotland)		CAD (England)		MAL (England)		BRH (England)		DON (England)		Pts
Pos	Rider	Bike	R1	R2	R1	R2	R1	R2	R1	R2	R1	R2	R1	R2	R1	R2	R1	R2	R1	R2	R1	R2	R1	R2	R1	R2	Pts
1	(England) Neil Hodgson	Ducati	4	3	2	3	3	1	1	4	2	2	1	Ret	1	2	6	2	1	2	1	4	6	Ret	1	2	422 (435 ?)
2	(England) Chris Walker	Suzuki	2	5	Ret	1	2	5	2	14	1	3	2	1	4	1	1	1	2	1	2	1	Ret	1	3	Ret	414
3	(England) John Reynolds	Ducati	1	4	1	2	4	3	3	1	3	1	3	5	5	3	5	4	3	4	3	2	3	3	2	3	405
4	(England) James Haydon	Ducati	5	1	3	Ret	1	4	4	2	4	4	4	2	2	4	Ret	3	Ret	3	5	3	2	7	4	1	341
5	(Scotland) Niall Mackenzie	Ducati	6	Ret	4	5	7	Ret	Ret	3	5	5	6	4	6	Ret	4	Ret	4	17	9	7	8	4	6	4	200
6	(England) Steve Plater	Kawasaki	9	Ret	5	6	6	7	6	7	Ret	Ret	5	6			7	9	10	5	4	5	24	6	5	5	176
7	(Scotland) Steve Hislop	Yamaha	3	2	Ret	4	5	2	5	5	8	10	7	3	3	5											168
8	(Scotland) John Crawford	Suzuki	10	6	9	Ret	8	12	8	8	6	6	13	7	8	7	Ret	5	5	Ret	6	6	Ret	10	7	7	166
9	(England) Michael Rutter	Yamaha	26	10	Ret	9	12	Ret	12	11	10	7	Ret		Ret	10	2	6	11	7	10	8	1	2	Ret	9	157
10	(England) Sean Emmett	Honda	12	8	6	Ret	11	13			12	Ret	9	9	11	9	9	8	6	6	8	9	5	Ret	8	10	135
11	(Australia) Paul Young	Yamaha	13	11	14	10	10	11	13	13	Ret	Ret	8	10	9	8	3	7	8	8	11	13	10	Ret			117
12	(England) James Toseland	Honda	11	9	8	7	Ret	10	7	6	9	9	10	8	7	6											101
13	(England) Paul Brown	Yamaha	8	7	11	11	Ret	6	11	12	11	8	11	12	12	11	Ret	10									83
14	(England) Shane Byrne	Honda	7	Ret	10	8	Ret		9	10									7	9	Ret	10	9	5	Ret	12	80
15	(England) Gordon Blackley	Kawasaki	15	12	13	13	Ret	14	20	Ret	Ret	15	14	Ret	14	22	12	13	12	14	15	16	15	11	13	13	44
16	(England) David Jefferies	Yamaha																	9	10	7	11	7	Ret	9	Ret	43
17	(England) John Crockford	Suzuki	14	Ret	12	12	13	9	16	15	13	Ret	15	15	Ret	Ret	11	11	16	Ret	Ret				11	Ret	41
18	(Australia) Peter Goddard	Kawasaki	Ret	Ret	7	Ret	9	8	10	9																	37
19	(England) Dave Heal	Kawasaki	18	14	Ret	15	16	16	14	Ret	15	Ret	12	14	13	12	Ret	12	13	12	14	14	25	19	17	14	36
20	(United States) Tom Kipp	Honda															8	14	14	13	17	12	11	Ret	12	11	33
21	(Australia) Anthony Gobert	Yamaha																			13	17	4	Ret	10	6	32
22	(Australia) Martin Craggill	Kawasaki									7	Ret	Ret	11	10	Ret					12	Ret					24
23	(England) Dean Ellison	Honda			19	Ret			Ret	Ret		13			17	16	10	15	19	16	20	20	13	8	16	15	22
24	(England) Dave Wood	Yamaha	17	13	15	17	19	18	15	16	17	Ret	20	Ret	18	14	Ret	Ret	15	11	18	15	17	13	14		19
25	(England) Francis Williamson	Yamaha	Ret	Ret	24	14	14	Ret	17	17	14	11	Ret	16	22	13							14	17	15	16	16
26	(England) Karl Harris	Yamaha							Ret														12	9	Ret		0
27	(England) Steve Marks	Yamaha	19	15	16	16	17	15	19	20			16	17	19	25	13	19	20	19	19	19	16	12	Ret	19	9
27	(England) Nigel Nottingham	Yamaha	23	17	17	19	15	17		19	16	12	18	19	16	15	16	16	17	15	16	18	Ret	14	Ret		9
29	(Italy) Alessandro Gramigni	Kawasaki																							Ret	8	8
30	(England) Robert Frost	Honda											Ret	13	Ret												3
30	(England) Dave Redgate	Kawasaki	20	16	20	21	Ret		18	Ret	18	14	22		Ret	20			22	Ret			23	15	18	18	3
32	(Wales) Paul A. Jones	Kawasaki	25	20	Ret	22	22	19	21	21	20	17	19	18	24	23	14	18	23	21			21	22	Ret	20	2
33	(England) Carl Rennie	Kawasaki	Ret		22	24	21	21	Ret						15	17	Ret						19	20	21	17	1
33	(England) Colin Hipwell	Suzuki	22	Ret	25	18	20	20	22	18	Ret	Ret	21	20	20	18	15	17	21	18	22	22	Ret	24	20	Ret	1
	(England) Brett Sampson	Kawasaki	16	18	18	29	18	Ret	Ret		19	16	17		21	19	Ret	Ret									0
	(England) Lee Humphries	Kawasaki			Ret	25	23	22	26	23	21	19	23	22					24	22			20	16	Ret	22	0
	(France) Bernard Cazade	Yamaha																							Ret	18	0
	(England) Paul Jones	Yamaha																	18	20					Ret		0
	(Australia) Paul Free	Kawasaki																			21	21	18	21	19	Ret	0
	(England) Jim Hodson	Kawasaki	24	19	21	Ret					Ret	Ret			Ret	21											0
	(Scotland) Kris Wilson	Honda	21	Ret	23	23	24	23	23	24	22	20	26	21													0
	(England) Nicol Robb	Yamaha							24	26	24	18	25	23	23	24							22	23	22	21	0
	(England) Roger Smith	Yamaha			Ret				Ret	27	23	21															0
	(England) Dan Harris	Yamaha							Ret	22			24														0
	(England) Neil Cray	Ducati							25	25																	0
Pos	Rider	Bike	BRH (England)		DON (England)		THR (England)		OUL (England)		SNE (England)		SIL (England)		OUL (England)		KNO (Scotland)		CAD (England)		MAL (England)		BRH (England)		DON (England)		Pts

Colour	Result
Gold	Winner
Silver	Second place
Bronze	Third place
Green	Points classification
Blue	Non-points classification
Blue	Non-classified finish (NC)
Purple	Retired, not classified (Ret)
Red	Did not qualify (DNQ)
Red	Did not pre-qualify (DNPQ)
Black	Disqualified (DSQ)
White	Did not start (DNS)
White	Withdrew (WD)
White	Race cancelled (C)
Blank	Did not practice (DNP)
Blank	Did not arrive (DNA)
Blank	Excluded (EX)

=== Privateers' Championship ===
2000 British Superbike Privateers' Championship
Pos	Rider	Bike	BRH (England)		DON (England)		THR (England)		OUL (England)		SNE (England)		SIL (England)		OUL (England)		KNO (Scotland)		CAD (England)		MAL (England)		BRH (England)		DON (England)		Pts
Pos	Rider	Bike	R1	R2	R1	R2	R1	R2	R1	R2	R1	R2	R1	R2	R1	R2	R1	R2	R1	R2	R1	R2	R1	R2	R1	R2	Pts
1	(England) Dave Heal	Kawasaki																									NNN
2	[[]]	Yamaha																									NNN
3	[[]]	Suzuki																									NNN
4	[[]]	Suzuki																									NNN
5	[[]]	Yamaha																									NNN
6	[[]]	Kawasaki																									NNN
7	[[]]	Kawasaki																									NNN
8	[[]]	Yamaha																									NNN
9	[[]]	Kawasaki																									NNN
10	[[]]	Ducati																									NNN
Pos	Rider	Bike	BRH (England)		DON (England)		THR (England)		OUL (England)		SNE (England)		SIL (England)		OUL (England)		KNO (Scotland)		CAD (England)		MAL (England)		BRH (England)		DON (England)		Pts

Colour	Result
Gold	Winner
Silver	Second place
Bronze	Third place
Green	Points classification
Blue	Non-points classification
Blue	Non-classified finish (NC)
Purple	Retired, not classified (Ret)
Red	Did not qualify (DNQ)
Red	Did not pre-qualify (DNPQ)
Black	Disqualified (DSQ)
White	Did not start (DNS)
White	Withdrew (WD)
White	Race cancelled (C)
Blank	Did not practice (DNP)
Blank	Did not arrive (DNA)
Blank	Excluded (EX)

=== Manufacturers' Championship ===
2003 British Superbike Manufacturers' Championship
Pos	Manufacturer	Bike	BRH (England)		DON (England)		THR (England)		OUL (England)		SNE (England)		SIL (England)		OUL (England)		KNO (Scotland)		CAD (England)		MAL (England)		BRH (England)		DON (England)		Pts
Pos	Manufacturer	Bike	R1	R2	R1	R2	R1	R2	R1	R2	R1	R2	R1	R2	R1	R2	R1	R2	R1	R2	R1	R2	R1	R2	R1	R2	Pts
1	(Italy) Ducati	Ducati	1	1	1	2	1	1	1	1	2	1	1	2	1	2	4	2	1	2	1	2	2	3	1	1	539
2	(Japan) Suzuki	Suzuki	2	5	9	1	2	5	2	8	1	3	2	1	4	1	1	1	2	1	2	1	Ret	1	3	7	411
3	(Japan) Yamaha	Yamaha	3	2	11	4	5	2	5	5	8	7	7	3	3	5	2	6	8	7	7	8	1	2	9	6	302
4	(Japan) Kawasaki	Kawasaki	9	12	5	6	6	7	6	7	7	14	5	6	10	12	7	9	10	5	4	5	15	6	5	5	202
5	(Japan) Honda	Honda	7	8	6	7	11	10	7	6	9	9	9	8	7	6	8	8	6	6	8	9	5	5	8	10	201
Pos	Manufacturer	Bike	BRH (England)		DON (England)		THR (England)		OUL (England)		SNE (England)		SIL (England)		OUL (England)		KNO (Scotland)		CAD (England)		MAL (England)		BRH (England)		DON (England)		Pts

Colour	Result
Gold	Winner
Silver	Second place
Bronze	Third place
Green	Points classification
Blue	Non-points classification
Blue	Non-classified finish (NC)
Purple	Retired, not classified (Ret)
Red	Did not qualify (DNQ)
Red	Did not pre-qualify (DNPQ)
Black	Disqualified (DSQ)
White	Did not start (DNS)
White	Withdrew (WD)
White	Race cancelled (C)
Blank	Did not practice (DNP)
Blank	Did not arrive (DNA)
Blank	Excluded (EX)
