= Steve Plater =

British motorcycle racer (born 1968)

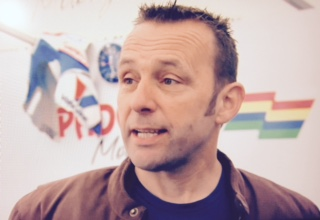
- Plater in 2015
- Nationality: English
- Born: 22 August 1968 (age 58); Luton, England
Motorcycle racing career statistics
Supersport World Championship
Active years	2009
Manufacturers	Triumph
Championships	0
2008 championship position	32nd (5 pts)
Starts / Wins / Podiums / Poles / F. laps / Points; 1 / 0 / 0 / 0 / 0 / 5
Isle of Man TT career
TTs contested	3 (2007–2009)
TT wins	2
First TT win	2008 Supersport TT
Last TT win	2009 Senior TT
TT podiums	3

Steve Plater (born 22 August 1968, in Luton) is an English former motorcycle road racer. He was the 2009 British Supersport Champion, and also finished as runner-up in the series twice in the late 1990s. In the British Superbike Championship, he has four wins and 17 further podiums.

Plater won the prestigious Isle of Man Senior TT, North West 200, the Race of the Year and also enjoyed success at Endurance racing. For 2015 and 2016, Plater is manager of a race-team, and rides in demonstration events. He lives in Woodhall Spa, Lincolnshire, and is involved in property development with his father.

== Race career ==
Having briefly raced speedway in his teens, Plater started his working life as a bricklayer, beginning racing in 1994 and winning his first ever race at Cadwell Park. In 1998, he won the British Powerbike championship, but however lost the more prestigious Supersport title on countback. He set an impressive pace at the 1999 Bol d'Or en route to finishing third on a Kawasaki, which led him to race this bike in the 2000 British Superbike Championship full-time, finishing sixth overall without a podium but with a string of fourth to seventh places. He missed much of 2001 due to injury, but still took three podiums. 2002 was his strongest season to date, seeing him finish fifth overall on a Yamaha, with two late-season wins. In 2003, he rode a Honda to sixth overall, winning at Cadwell Park.

Plater missed the start of 2006 due to injury, but returned to win both Superbike races at the North West 200. He won the 2007 Albacete 6-Hour Endurance race on a Kawasaki, teamed with Julian Mazuecos and Gwen Giabbani. He was voted Best Newcomer at the 2007 Isle of Man TT on Yamaha, having been mentored by former racer Mick Grant.

Most of Plater's 2008 races were on Yamaha machinery. He won the Supersport TT race after on-the-road winner Bruce Anstey's bike was excluded. As for circuit racing, he started the year in the British Superbike Championship, but a lack of success saw him switch to Supersport, winning first time out before a one-off in the Brands Hatch round of the World Supersport Championship on a Triumph.

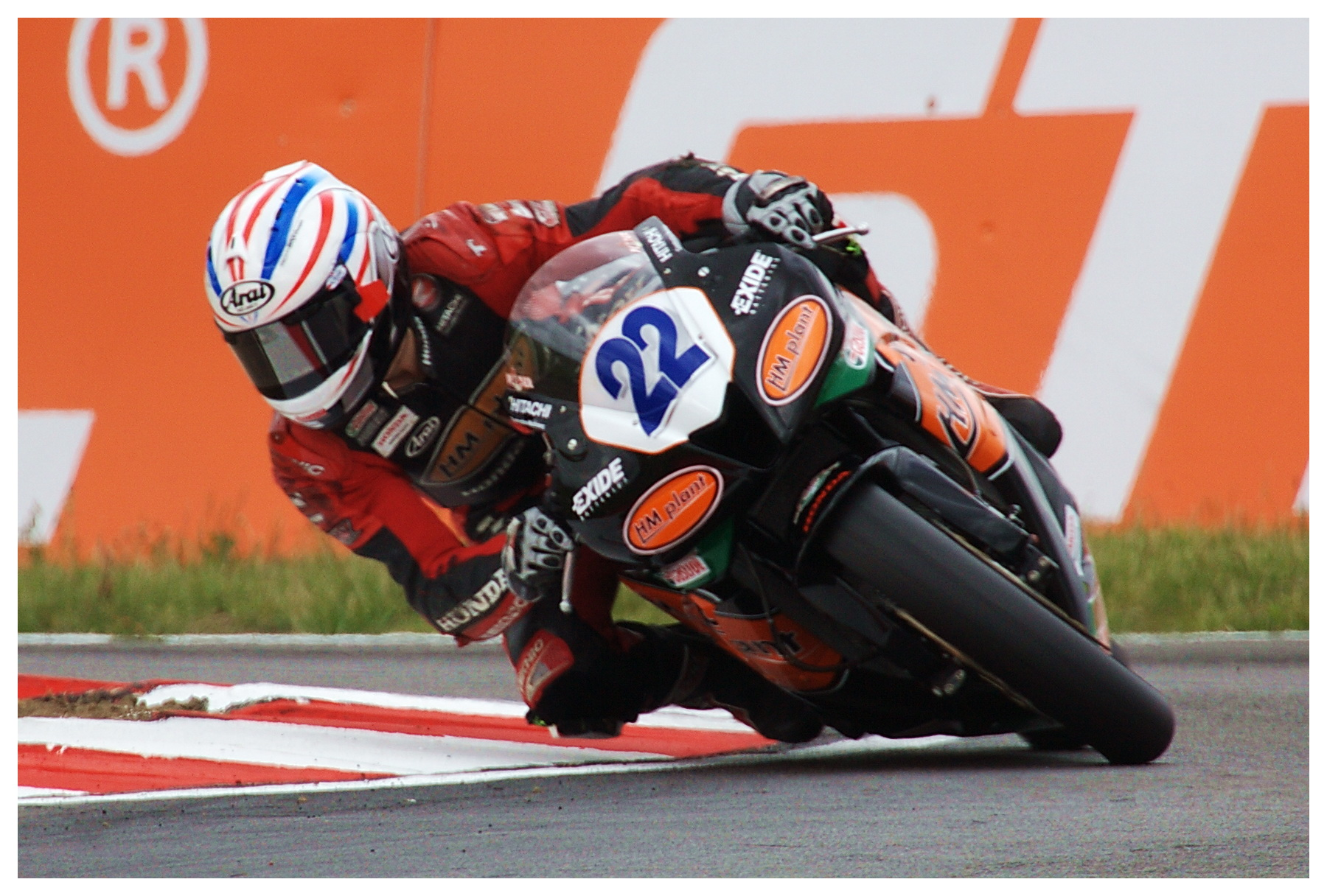
Plater at Snetterton in 2009

Plater spent 2009 with the HM Plant Honda team in Supersport, winning the title ahead of Australian Billy McConnell at the final round. He also stood in on a Superbike at Brands Hatch after Josh Brookes' visa was delayed, falling from the lead in race one but finishing third in race two. In the 2009 Isle of Man Senior TT race, Plater set a new race record, beating team-mate John McGuinness after his chain broke on the fourth lap. He also won the North West 200. He also contested the Le Mans 24 Hours motorcycle race for Honda France.

During Thursday practice for the 2010 North West 200, Plater, who had set the fastest time in Superbike practice on the Tuesday, was injured in an accident. He suffered from a broken arm when he came off his bike at Quarry Hill on the Coast Road section of the course. Subsequent hospital examinations revealed that Plater had fractured his neck. In 2011 Plater confirmed his retirement from the roads to concentrate on World Endurance Championship.

== After riding ==
Plater became a motorcycle racing co-commentator and presenter, and in 2015 was appointed as manager of the Prime Factors Racing team for Road Racing and Endurance. He continues to ride in demonstration events. He is currently a co-host on the podcast "The TT Podcast," on which he interviews persons and riders associated with Isle of Man TT.

== Career statistics ==
=== British Superbike Championship ===
==== Races by year ====
(key) (Races in bold indicate pole position; races in italics indicate fastest lap)

Year	Bike	1		2		3		4		5		6		7		8		9		10		11		12		13		Pos	Pts
Year	Bike	R1	R2	R1	R2	R1	R2	R1	R2	R1	R2	R1	R2	R1	R2	R1	R2	R1	R2	R1	R2	R1	R2	R1	R2	R1	R2	Pos	Pts
2001	Kawasaki	DON; 14	DON; Ret	SIL	SIL	SNE	SNE	OUL	OUL	BRH; 3	BRH; 5	THR; 2	THR; Ret	OUL	OUL	KNO	KNO	CAD; 8	CAD; 8	BRH	BRH	MAL; 6	MAL; 6	ROC	ROC	DON; 3	DON; 5	11th	123
2004	Yamaha	SIL; Ret	SIL; 9	BHI; 11	BHI; 12	SNE; Ret	SNE; 8	OUL; DNS	OUL; DNS	MON	MON	THR	THR	BHGP	BHGP	KNO	KNO	MAL; 11	MAL; 10	CRO; Ret	CRO; 10	CAD; Ret	CAD; Ret	OUL; 5	OUL; 7	DON; Ret	DON; 10	17th	67
2006	Kawasaki	BHI; DNQ	BHI; DNQ	DON; DNS	DON; DNS																							19th	37
2006	Honda					THR; 13	THR; 14	OUL; Ret	OUL; Ret	MON; C	MON; C	MAL; Ret	MAL; DNS	SNE	SNE	KNO	KNO											19th	37
2006	Suzuki																	OUL; 11	OUL; 11	CRO; 9	CRO; 11	CAD; Ret	CAD; 6	SIL	SIL	BHGP	BHGP	19th	37
2008	Yamaha	BHGP; C	BHGP; C	THR; Ret	THR; 12	OUL	OUL	BHGP	BHGP	DON	DON	SNE	SNE	MAL	MAL	OUL	OUL	KNO	KNO	CAD	CAD	CRO	CRO	SIL	SIL	BHI	BHI	28th	4

Year	Bike	1		2		3		4		5		6		7		8			9		10		11		12			Pos	Pts
Year	Bike	R1	R2	R1	R2	R1	R2	R1	R2	R1	R2	R1	R2	R1	R2	R1	R2	R3	R1	R2	R1	R2	R1	R2	R1	R2	R3	Pos	Pts
2009	Honda	BHI; Ret	BHI; 3	OUL	OUL	DON	DON	THR	THR	SNE	SNE	KNO	KNO	MAL	MAL	BHGP	BHGP	BHGP	CAD	CAD	CRO	CRO	SIL	SIL	OUL	OUL	OUL	20th	16

=== British Supersport Championship ===
==== Races by year ====
(key) (Races in bold indicate pole position; races in italics indicate fastest lap)

Year	Bike	1	2	3	4	5	6	7	8	9	10	11	12	13	Pos	Pts
2006	Yamaha	BHI	DON	THR; 7	OUL; 7	MON; C	MAL	SNE	KNO	OUL	CRO	CAD	SIL; 8	BHGP	21st	26
2008	Yamaha	BHI	THR	OUL	BHGP	DON	SNE; 1	MAL; 2	OUL; Ret	KNO	CAD; 1	CRO	SIL; 3	BHI; 2	5th	106
2009	Honda	BHI; 2	OUL; 11	DON; 1	THR; 2	SNE; 1	KNO; 11	MAL; 7	BHGP; 3	CAD; 2	CRO; 1	SIL; 2	**OUL**; 1		1st	215

Year	Bike	1		2		3		4		5		6		7		8		9		10		11		12			Pos	Pts
Year	Bike	R1	R2	R1	R2	R1	R2	R1	R2	R1	R2	R1	R2	R1	R2	R1	R2	R1	R2	R1	R2	R1	R2	R1	R2	R3	Pos	Pts
2011	Honda	BRH; 5	BRH; 3	OUL; 7	OUL; Ret	CRO; 3	**CRO**; 2	THR; 8	THR; Ret	KNO	KNO	SNE	SNE	OUL	OUL; C	BRH	BRH	CAD	CAD	DON	DON	SIL	SIL	BRH	BRH	BRH	15th	80

=== Supersport World Championship ===
==== Races by year ====
(key) (Races in bold indicate pole position; races in italics indicate fastest lap)

Year	Bike	1	2	3	4	5	6	7	8	9	10	11	12	13	Pos	Pts
2008	Triumph	QAT	AUS	ESP	NED	ITA	GER	SMR	CZE	GBR; 11	EUR	ITA	FRA	POR	32nd	5

=== FIM Endurance World Championship ===
Year	Team	Bike	Rider	TC
2008	(Austria) Yamaha Austrian Endurance Team	Yamaha YZF-R1	(Slovenia) Igor Jerman (United Kingdom) Steve Martin (United Kingdom) Steve Plater (France) Gwen Giabbani	2nd

Sporting positions
Preceded by Michael Rutter	Macau Motorcycle Grand Prix Winner; 2006–2007	Succeeded by Stuart Easton
