= James Haydon =

British motorcycle racer

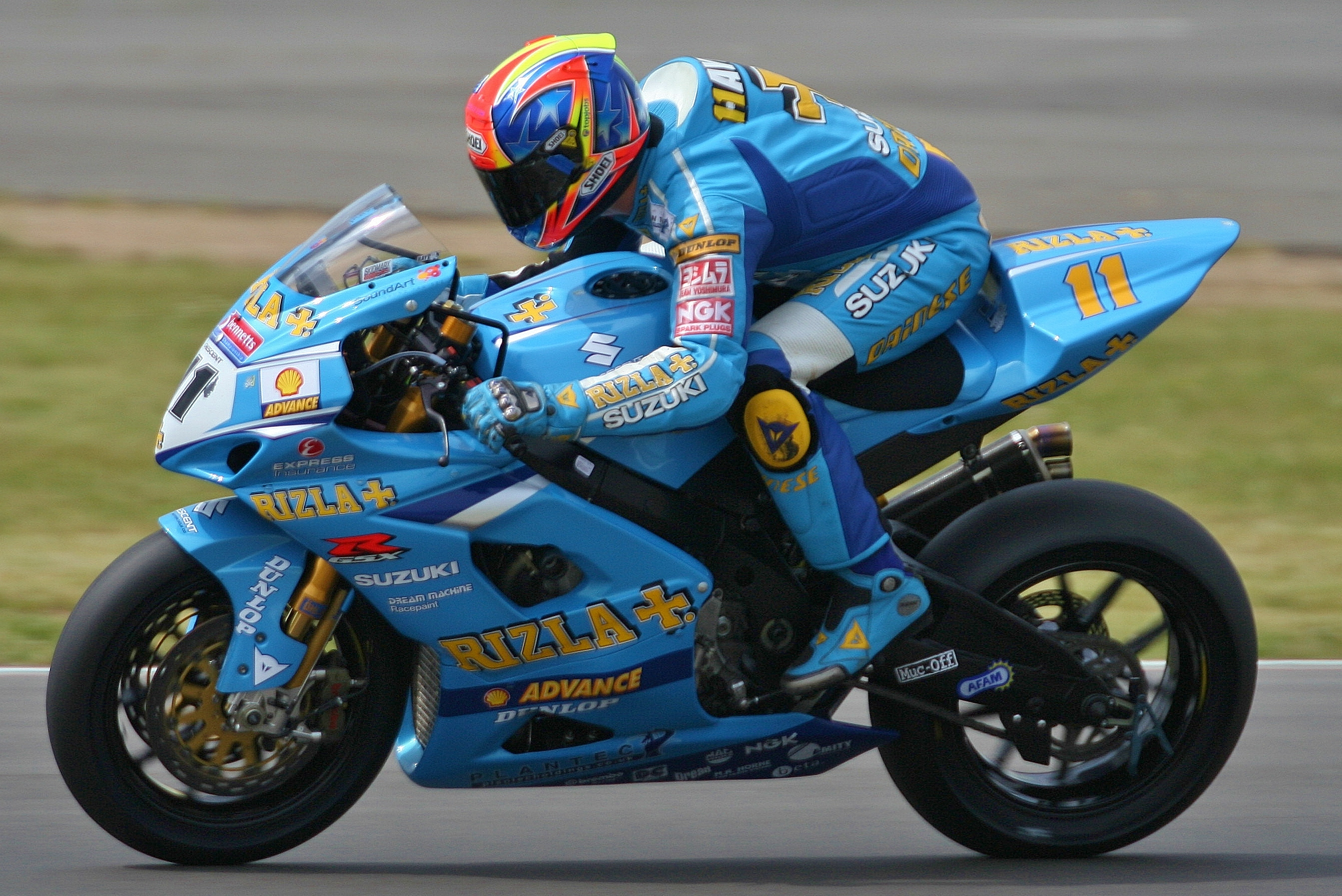
- James Haydon on Rizla Suzuki GSX-R 1000
- Nationality: English
- Born: 2 November 1973 (age 53); Amersham, Buckinghamshire
- Website: https://www.jameshaydon.co.uk

James Richard Barnaby Haydon (born 2 November 1973 in Amersham, Buckinghamshire) is a British former motorcycle racer. He raced in 250cc and 500cc Grand Prix, MotoGP, British and the World Superbike Championships. He retired in 2008.Haydon now works in media, presenting shows and race commentating on ITV and British Eurosport for World Superbike Championship and British Superbike Championship coverage, and he covers some Moto GP races when the regular commentators are unavailable. He has worked for the BBC, Sky Sports, Motors TV, Al Jazeera and Radio 5 Live. He is also the guest test rider for Bike magazine.

== Biography ==
Haydon got his passion for speed through his father David, a doctor who loved fast cars and motorcycles. He bought him his first motorcycle aged eight which he would ride in his parents' garden. He quickly moved into motocross and worked his way up into the top-40 in British Schoolboy Motocross.

Haydon swapped to road racing in 1990 at the age of 16. In his first year, he finished second in the British 125 Ministock Championship, where he began his friendship with Neil Hodgson who was also starting in ministocks that season. In 1991, Haydon moved into the British 125cc Championship and won the EMRA 125cc Championship. In 1992, he was recruited for Team Great Britain by Ron Haslam. Haydon raced a Yamaha TZ250 and won his first British Championship race at Silverstone that same year.

In 1993, Haydon performed well at the British 250cc Championship but lost the final race after the camera he was carrying for TV came loose, jamming his back wheel and causing him to crash. The same season, he competed in the 1993 British 500cc Grand Prix, finishing 11th to become the youngest ever British points-scorer in a top-division World Championship race. He finished of his mentor, Ron Haslam. In 1994, he won his first British Superbike Championship race along with two more national 250cc victories that year.

In 1995, Haydon competed in the top level 500cc world championship as a privateer (1995 for Harris and 1996 for WCM). He decided to move to the WSBK in 1997. Haydon quit after the bike broke down fourteen times. His best result was a ninth-placed finish.

Haydon returned to the British Superbike championship in 1998. He raced for Team Suzuki, Team Red Bull Ducati, Team Yamaha and Team Kawasaki. A mid-season car accident damaged Haydon's neck and nerves badly, affecting his training and performance. He twice finished fourth in the standings and won a total of 12 British Superbike Championship races.

In 2002, Haydon joined Carl Fogarty's Foggy Petronas in the WSBK, developing the new bike for the first year. It proved unreliable and Haydon had to leap from the motorcycle twice when it blew up during a ride. His high point of the season was a best result of seventh in the world in Japan.

In 2004, Haydon stood in at Virgin Mobile Yamaha in the British Superbike series. He finished top Yamaha in Britain. 2004 was the only season in Haydon's career that he never crashed, even in practice. At the end of the season, he also raced in the last few MotoGP's (World Championship) for Kenny Roberts Proton team. His best result an impressive 12th place in Qatar.

Due to his success in the 2004 season, Haydon he signed a two-year deal for Airwaves Ducati. A pre-season testing injury at Albacete saw Gregorio Lavilla take over his ride. Haydon filled in for various teams throughout 2005, and eventually ending up at Team Suzuki after John Reynolds was injured.

Haydon stayed with the Team for 2006 alongside 2003 champion Shane Byrne. After a strong start at Oulton Park on identical bikes, Haydon was given a new bike, which he disliked. In race 2, a brake problem caused Haydon to collide with Dean Thomas, leaving both Thomas and Haydon injured. Haydon returned to race later that season. The incident was reviewed by an RAC panel and Haydon was cleared of all responsibility when the data logging proved the problem had been outside his control.

For 2007, Haydon returned to Virgin Yamaha alongside Tommy Hill in a team he had excelled with in the past. Later that year, he signed as 'Super Sub' for Hawk Kawasaki and in his first race with them he finished top of his team.

For 2008, Hawk Kawasaki offered Haydon a season contract. However, two weeks before the start of the race season, they were forced to pull out when one of their main sponsors withdrew.

Haydon was contacted by Eurosport and decided to leave racing. He has never raced at the top level since.

Haydon now presents for British Eurosport, mainly on the British Superbike Championship. He is also a regular studio guest on the live World Superbike Championship rounds. For the first time in three years, Haydon got back on a modern bike at the 2010 British Superbike Championship round at Brands Hatch, Haydon joined the select few and rode some fast demo laps on the 2010 Rizla Suzuki Moto GP bike.

== Personal life ==
Haydon's parents, Beverley (née Rhodes) and David Haydon, are both retired and live close by. His dad still owns and rides many motorcycles. Haydon has three sisters Annabel, Susannah and Charlotte. Haydon is married to Jo Wybrew and they have three children, Zac, Maya and Lexi. The couple lived in Andorra for many years but now reside back in England where Haydon works as a property developer. He is the nephew of designer Zandra Rhodes.

== Career statistics ==
=== British Superbike Championship ===
(key) (Races in bold indicate pole position; races in italics indicate fastest lap)

Year	Class	Bike	1		2		3		4		5		6		7		8		9		10		11		12		13		Pos	Pts
Year	Class	Bike	R1	R2	R1	R2	R1	R2	R1	R2	R1	R2	R1	R2	R1	R2	R1	R2	R1	R2	R1	R2	R1	R2	R1	R2	R1	R2	Pos	Pts
2001	BSB	Yamaha	DON; 8	DON; 2	SIL; 4	SIL; 3	SNE; 3	SNE; 3	OUL; Ret	OUL; 3	BRH; Ret	BRH; 3	THR; 5	THR; 2	OUL; 3	OUL; 3	KNO; 4	KNO; Ret	CAD; 2	CAD; 4	BRH; 4	BRH; 4	MAL; Ret	MAL; 3	ROC; 5	ROC; 4	DON; Ret	DON; 2	4th	316
2004	BSB	Ducati/Yaamaha	SIL	SIL	BHI	BHI	SNE; 10	SNE; 14	OUL	OUL	MON; 9	MON; 12	THR; Ret	THR; Ret	BHGP; 8	BHGP; 6	KNO; 2	KNO; 1	MAL; 5	MAL; 4	CRO; 6	CRO; 5	CAD; 4	CAD; 6	OUL; 14	OUL; 8	DON; 8	DON; 8	8th	181
2006	BSB	Suzuki	BHI; 10	BHI; 7	DON; Ret	DON; Ret	THR; Ret	THR; Ret	OUL; 4	OUL; 17	MON; C	MON; C	MAL	MAL	SNE; 8	SNE; Ret	KNO	KNO	OUL	OUL	CRO	CRO	CAD	CAD	SIL; Ret	SIL; 9	BHGP; 9	BHGP; 6	15th	57

Year	Bike	1			2			3			4			5			6			7			8			9			10			11			12			Pos	Pts
Year	Bike	R1	R2	R3	R1	R2	R3	R1	R2	R3	R1	R2	R3	R1	R2	R3	R1	R2	R3	R1	R2	R3	R1	R2	R3	R1	R2	R3	R1	R2	R3	R1	R2	R3	R1	R2	R3	Pos	Pts
2008	Kawasaki	THR	THR		OUL	OUL		BHGP	BHGP		DON	DON		SNE	SNE		MAL; Ret	MAL; 15		OUL; 12	OUL; 15		KNO	KNO		CAD	CAD		CRO; 19	CRO; DNS		SIL	SIL		BHI	BHI		26th	6

=== Superbike World Championship ===
==== Races by year ====
(key) (Races in bold indicate pole position) (Races in italics indicate fastest lap)

Year	Bike	1		2		3		4		5		6		7		8		9		10		11		12		13		14		Pos	Pts
Year	Bike	R1	R2	R1	R2	R1	R2	R1	R2	R1	R2	R1	R2	R1	R2	R1	R2	R1	R2	R1	R2	R1	R2	R1	R2	R1	R2	R1	R2	Pos	Pts
2003	Petronas	SPA; 12	SPA; Ret	AUS; 15	AUS; 16	JPN; 9	JPN; Ret	ITA; Ret	ITA; Ret	GER; Ret	GER; DNS	GBR	GBR	SMR	SMR	USA; Ret	USA; Ret	GBR; 17	GBR; Ret	NED; DNS	NED; DNS	ITA; Ret	ITA; Ret	FRA; Ret	FRA; Ret					26th	12
