= 2001 British Superbike Championship =

British motorcycle racing season

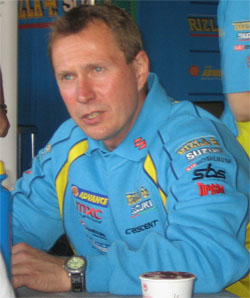
2001 champion, John Reynolds

The 2001 British Superbike Championship season was the 14th season. The title was won by John Reynolds aboard the Revé Red Bull Ducati winning 12 of the 26 races. Reynolds' nearest challenger Steve Hislop was in title contention until he was injured in the second race at Rockingham ruled him out for the rest of the season. Changes to the qualifying structure to try and make it more of a spectacle with the introduction of the Superpole format. With the British Superbike Championship being broadcast on the BBC for this season superbikes became more popular with a rise in audience of 42%.

== Calendar ==
2001 Calendar
| Round | | Circuit | Date | Pole position | Fastest lap | Winning rider | Winning team | Ref |
|---|---|---|---|---|---|---|---|---|
| 1 | R1 | (England) Donington Park | 1 April | (England) John Reynolds | (England) James Haydon | (England) John Reynolds | Reve Red Bull Ducati | |
| 1 | R2 | (England) Donington Park | 1 April | (England) John Reynolds | (England) James Haydon | (England) John Reynolds | Reve Red Bull Ducati | |
| 2 | R1 | (England) Silverstone | 16 April | (Scotland) Steve Hislop | (England) John Reynolds | (England) John Reynolds | Reve Red Bull Ducati | |
| 2 | R2 | (England) Silverstone | 16 April | (Scotland) Steve Hislop | (England) John Reynolds | (Scotland) Steve Hislop | MonsterMob Ducati | |
| 3 | R1 | (England) Snetterton | 7 May | (England) John Reynolds | (England) John Reynolds | (England) John Reynolds | Reve Red Bull Ducati | |
| 3 | R2 | (England) Snetterton | 7 May | (England) John Reynolds | (England) John Reynolds | (England) John Reynolds | Reve Red Bull Ducati | |
| 4 | R1 | (England) Oulton Park | 13 May | (Scotland) Steve Hislop | (Scotland) Steve Hislop | (Scotland) Steve Hislop | MonsterMob Ducati | |
| 4 | R2 | (England) Oulton Park | 13 May | (Scotland) Steve Hislop | (Scotland) Steve Hislop | (Scotland) Steve Hislop | MonsterMob Ducati | |
| 5 | R1 | (England) Brands Hatch GP | 17 June | (Scotland) Steve Hislop | (England) John Reynolds | (Scotland) Steve Hislop | MonsterMob Ducati | |
| 5 | R2 | (England) Brands Hatch GP | 17 June | (Scotland) Steve Hislop | (Scotland) Steve Hislop | (Scotland) Steve Hislop | MonsterMob Ducati | |
| 6 | R1 | (England) Thruxton | 1 July | (England) Steve Plater | (Scotland) Steve Hislop | (Scotland) Steve Hislop | MonsterMob Ducati | |
| 6 | R2 | (England) Thruxton | 1 July | (England) Steve Plater | (England) James Haydon | (England) John Reynolds | Reve Red Bull Ducati | |
| 7 | R1 | (England) Oulton Park | 22 July | (Scotland) Steve Hislop | (England) John Reynolds | (Scotland) Steve Hislop | MonsterMob Ducati | |
| 7 | R2 | (England) Oulton Park | 22 July | (Scotland) Steve Hislop | (England) John Reynolds | (Scotland) Steve Hislop | MonsterMob Ducati | |
| 8 | R1 | (Scotland) Knockhill | 12 August | (England) John Reynolds | (England) John Reynolds | (England) John Reynolds | Reve Red Bull Ducati | |
| 8 | R2 | (Scotland) Knockhill | 12 August | (England) John Reynolds | (England) John Reynolds | (England) John Reynolds | Reve Red Bull Ducati | |
| 9 | R1 | (England) Cadwell Park | 27 August | (Scotland) Steve Hislop | (Scotland) Steve Hislop | (Scotland) Steve Hislop | MonsterMob Ducati | |
| 9 | R2 | (England) Cadwell Park | 27 August | (Scotland) Steve Hislop | (England) Sean Emmett | (Scotland) Steve Hislop | MonsterMob Ducati | |
| 10 | R1 | (England) Brands Hatch Indy | 2 September | (England) John Reynolds | (Scotland) Steve Hislop | (Scotland) Steve Hislop | MonsterMob Ducati | |
| 10 | R2 | (England) Brands Hatch Indy | 2 September | (England) John Reynolds | (England) John Reynolds | (England) John Reynolds | Reve Red Bull Ducati | |
| 11 | R1 | (England) Mallory Park | 16 September | (Scotland) Steve Hislop | (England) Sean Emmett | (England) John Reynolds | Reve Red Bull Ducati | |
| 11 | R2 | (England) Mallory Park | 16 September | (Scotland) Steve Hislop | (Scotland) Steve Hislop | (Scotland) Steve Hislop | MonsterMob Ducati | |
| 12 | R1 | (England) Rockingham | 30 September | (Scotland) Steve Hislop | (England) Michael Rutter | (England) Sean Emmett | Reve Red Bull Ducati | |
| 12 | R2 | (England) Rockingham | 30 September | (Scotland) Steve Hislop | (England) Michael Rutter | (England) Michael Rutter | Team Kawasaki | |
| 13 | R1 | (England) Donington Park | 14 October | (England) John Reynolds | (England) John Reynolds | (England) John Reynolds | Reve Red Bull Ducati | |
| 13 | R2 | (England) Donington Park | 14 October | (England) John Reynolds | (England) John Reynolds | (England) John Reynolds | Reve Red Bull Ducati | |

== Entry list ==
2001 Entry List
| Team | Constructor | No. | Rider | Class | Rounds |
|---|---|---|---|---|---|
| Transatlantic Finance/Team Kawasaki | Kawasaki | 2 | (England) Steve Plater | | 1, 5–6, 9 |
| Transatlantic Finance/Team Kawasaki | Kawasaki | 2 | (England) Jamie Morley | | 4 |
| Transatlantic Finance/Team Kawasaki | Kawasaki | 9 | (England) Michael Rutter | | 1–6, 8–13 |
| Virgin Mobile Aiwa | Yamaha | 2 | (England) Steve Plater | | 11, 13 |
| Virgin Mobile Aiwa | Yamaha | 4 | (England) James Haydon | | All |
| Virgin Mobile Aiwa | Yamaha | 6 | (England) Jamie Robinson | | 1–11, 13 |
| Revé Red Bull | Ducati | 3 | (England) John Reynolds | | All |
| Revé Red Bull | Ducati | 5 | (England) Sean Emmett | | All |
| MonsterMob | Ducati | 7 | (Scotland) Steve Hislop | | 1–12 |
| Crescent Suzuki | Suzuki | 8 | (England) John Crawford | | All |
| Hawk Kawasaki | Kawasaki | 9 | (England) Michael Rutter | C | 7 |
| Hawk Kawasaki | Kawasaki | 14 | (England) Gorden Blackley | C | All |
| Hawk Kawasaki | Kawasaki | 15 | (England) Mark Burr | C | 1–6, 8–13 |
| Performance House | Suzuki | 11 | (England) Shane Byrne | C | All |
| Travel City Direct | Kawasaki | 12 | (England) Paul Jones | C | 1–2 |
| Team DBK Racing | Honda | 16 | (England) Peter Berwick | C | 1–5, 7, 9–11, 13 |
| Team DBK Racing | Honda | 17 | (England) Jason Davis | C | 1–7, 9–11, 13 |
| www.mandvc.com/racing | Yamaha | 18 | (England) Nigel Nottingham | C | 1–7, 9–13 |
| Macsport | Yamaha | 19 | (England) Lee Jackson | C | All |
| D&B Racing | Honda | 20 | (England) Dean Ellison | C | All |
| PRF Racing | Kawasaki | 23 | (England) Carl Rennie | C | 1, 4, 6 |
| Myco Motorsport | Kawasaki | 26 | (England) Dave Wood | C | 1–7, 9–13 |
| DiEnza Ducati Performance | Ducati | 33 | (Northern Ireland) James Courtney | | 12 |
| DiEnza Ducati Performance | Ducati | 34 | (England) Paul Brown | | 1–7, 9–13 |
| Team Buff | Kawasaki | 35 | (England) Dave Redgate | C | 1–6, 10–11 |
| T3 Racing | Yamaha | 55 | (England) Francis Williamson | C | 1–4 |
| T3 Racing | Yamaha | 77 | (England) Brett Sampson | C | 7, 9–10 |
| T3 Racing | Yamaha | | (England) Pete Jennings | C | 13 |
| PR Racing Liverpool | Honda | 68 | (England) Paul Jones | C | 2–7, 9–13 |
| Clifford James Footwear | Yamaha | 69 | (England) Steve Marks | C | 1–7, 9–13 |
| Clarion Suzuki | Suzuki | 88 | (Scotland) Niall Mackenzie | | 8 |

| Icon | Class |
|---|---|
| C | Privateers Cup |

Key
Regular Rider
Wildcard Rider
Replacement Rider

== Championship Tables ==
Points system
| Position | 1st | 2nd | 3rd | 4th | 5th | 6th | 7th | 8th | 9th | 10th | 11th | 12th | 13th | 14th | 15th |
| Race | 25 | 20 | 16 | 13 | 11 | 10 | 9 | 8 | 7 | 6 | 5 | 4 | 3 | 2 | 1 |

=== Riders' Championship ===
2001 Riders' Championship
| Pos | Rider | Bike | DON (England) | | SIL (England) | | SNE (England) | | OUL (England) | | BRH (England) | | THR (England) | | OUL (England) | | KNO (Scotland) | | CAD (England) | | BRH (England) | | MAL (England) | | ROC (England) | | DON (England) | | Pts |
| Pos | Rider | Bike | R1 | R2 | R1 | R2 | R1 | R2 | R1 | R2 | R1 | R2 | R1 | R2 | R1 | R2 | R1 | R2 | R1 | R2 | R1 | R2 | R1 | R2 | R1 | R2 | R1 | R2 | Pts |
|---|---|---|---|---|---|---|---|---|---|---|---|---|---|---|---|---|---|---|---|---|---|---|---|---|---|---|---|---|---|
| 1 | (England) John Reynolds | Ducati | 1 | 1 | 1 | 2 | 1 | 1 | 2 | 2 | 2 | Ret | 4 | 1 | 2 | 2 | 1 | 1 | 3 | 2 | 2 | 1 | 1 | 5 | 3 | 2 | 1 | 1 | 536 |
| 2 | (Scotland) Steve Hislop | Ducati | 2 | 5 | 2 | 1 | 2 | 2 | 1 | 1 | 1 | 1 | 1 | 6 | 1 | 1 | 3 | 2 | 1 | 1 | 1 | 2 | 3 | 1 | Ret | DNS | | | 475 |
| 3 | (England) Sean Emmett | Ducati | Ret | 6 | 5 | 4 | 4 | 4 | 3 | 6 | Ret | Ret | 3 | 4 | 4 | 4 | 2 | 3 | 4 | 3 | 3 | 3 | 2 | 8 | 1 | 3 | 4 | 10 | 326 |
| 4 | (England) James Haydon | Yamaha | 8 | 2 | 4 | 3 | 3 | 3 | Ret | 3 | Ret | 3 | 5 | 2 | 3 | 3 | 4 | Ret | 2 | 4 | 4 | 4 | Ret | 3 | 5 | 4 | Ret | 2 | 316 |
| 5 | (England) Paul Brown | Ducati | 6 | 7 | 7 | 8 | 5 | 5 | 5 | 7 | Ret | 7 | 6 | 7 | 6 | 5 | 7 | 7 | Ret | 6 | 5 | 5 | 5 | 2 | 4 | 6 | 2 | 4 | 264 |
| 6 | (England) Michael Rutter | Kawasaki | 5 | 4 | 6 | 6 | Ret | Ret | 6 | 5 | 4 | 2 | 7 | 3 | 6 | 5 | 13 | 5 | 6 | Ret | 7 | 6 | Ret | Ret | 2 | 1 | 6 | 3 | 256 |
| 7 | (England) John Crawford | Suzuki | 3 | 3 | 3 | 5 | 7 | 7 | Ret | 4 | 11 | 6 | 9 | 8 | 5 | Ret | 6 | Ret | 5 | 11 | 6 | 7 | 4 | 4 | 12 | Ret | 5 | 6 | 222 |
| 8 | (England) Shane Byrne | Suzuki | 7 | 8 | 9 | 9 | 6 | 6 | 4 | 8 | 5 | 4 | 8 | 5 | Ret | 8 | 8 | 6 | 7 | Ret | 8 | 8 | Ret | 7 | Ret | 5 | 7 | 7 | 204 |
| 9 | (England) Jamie Robinson | Yamaha | Ret | 9 | 8 | 7 | Ret | 8 | 8 | Ret | 6 | Ret | 11 | 9 | 7 | 7 | 9 | 8 | Ret | 12 | 9 | 9 | 7 | 9 | | | 8 | 9 | 144 |
| 10 | (England) Lee Jackson | Yamaha | 14 | 11 | 11 | 11 | 9 | 10 | 16 | 9 | 8 | 8 | 10 | 10 | 10 | 11 | Ret | 8 | 9 | 7 | Ret | 10 | 8 | 10 | 6 | 7 | 9 | Ret | 138 |
| 11 | (England) Steve Plater | Kawasaki | 14 | Ret | | | | | | | 3 | 5 | 2 | Ret | | | | | 8 | 8 | | | 6 | 6 | | | 3 | 5 | 123 |
| 12 | (England) Dean Ellison | Honda | 9 | 16 | 20 | 10 | 14 | Ret | Ret | Ret | 10 | 13 | 19 | 15 | 8 | 10 | 10 | | 11 | 10 | 10 | 11 | 11 | Ret | 9 | 9 | 10 | 8 | 100 |
| 13 | (England) Nigel Nottingham | Yamaha | 12 | 17 | 12 | 13 | 13 | 13 | 10 | 13 | 12 | 9 | 17 | 12 | 11 | 12 | | | 17 | Ret | 17 | 15 | Ret | 15 | 8 | 11 | 13 | 11 | 82 |
| 14 | (England) Dave Wood | Kawasaki | 18 | Ret | 13 | 14 | 10 | 11 | 9 | 11 | 7 | Ret | 16 | 16 | 9 | 9 | | | 10 | Ret | 11 | 18 | 12 | 14 | 7 | 12 | Ret | Ret | 81 |
| 15 | (England) Gorden Blackley | Kawasaki | 13 | 13 | 10 | 21 | 12 | 14 | 13 | 12 | 11 | 14 | 13 | 17 | 12 | 14 | 11 | 10 | 13 | 17 | 16 | 12 | 10 | 16 | Ret | 8 | 12 | Ret | 77 |
| 16 | (England) Mark Burr | Kawasaki | Ret | Ret | 18 | 12 | 11 | 12 | 14 | 15 | 15 | Ret | 15 | 13 | | | 14 | 9 | 12 | 13 | 13 | Ret | 9 | 11 | 11 | 10 | 14 | 14 | 67 |
| 17 | (England) Jason Davis | Honda | 11 | 12 | 21 | 19 | Ret | DNS | 12 | 14 | 9 | 10 | 18 | 11 | Ret | 13 | | | 14 | 9 | 14 | DNS | Ret | 12 | | | 11 | 12 | 60 |
| 18 | (England) Paul Jones | Honda | | | 15 | 18 | 8 | 9 | 11 | 10 | Ret | DNS | 12 | 14 | Ret | Ret | | | 16 | 14 | 18 | 16 | 13 | DNS | Ret | Ret | 15 | 13 | 42 |
| 19 | (England) Steve Marks | Yamaha | Ret | 14 | 14 | 15 | 15 | 15 | 17 | 16 | Ret | 11 | 14 | Ret | 15 | 17 | | | 18 | 15 | 15 | 14 | 14 | Ret | 10 | Ret | Ret | Ret | 27 |
| 20 | (Scotland) Niall Mackenzie | Suzuki | | | | | | | | | | | | | | | 4 | 5 | | | | | | | | | | | 24 |
| 21 | (England) Francis Williamson | Yamaha | 10 | 10 | Ret | 17 | Ret | DNS | 15 | 19 | | | | | | | | | | | | | | | | | | | 13 |
| 22 | (England) Dave Redgate | Kawasaki | 17 | Ret | 17 | 16 | Ret | DNS | Ret | Ret | 13 | 12 | 13 | 16 | | | | | | | 19 | 17 | Ret | DNS | | | | | 10 |
| 23 | (England) Jamie Morley | Kawasaki | | | | | | | 7 | Ret | | | | | | | | | | | | | | | | | | | 9 |
| 24 | (England) Brett Sampson | Yamaha | | | | | | | | | | | | | Ret | 15 | | | 15 | Ret | 12 | 13 | | | | | | | 9 |
| 25 | (England) Peter Berwick | Honda | Ret | Ret | 16 | DNS | 16 | 16 | 19 | 18 | 14 | 15 | | | 14 | 18 | | | Ret | 16 | 20 | Ret | 15 | 13 | | | Ret | DNS | 9 |
| 26 | (England) Paul Jones | Kawasaki | 15 | 15 | 19 | 20 | | | | | | | | | | | | | | | | | | | | | | | 2 |
| | (England) Carl Rennie | Kawasaki | 16 | Ret | | | | | 18 | 17 | | | Ret | DNS | | | | | | | | | | | | | | | 0 |
| | (Northern Ireland) James Courtney | Ducati | | | | | | | | | | | | | | | | | | | | | | | Ret | Ret | | | 0 |
| | (England) Pete Jennings | Yamaha | | | | | | | | | | | | | | | | | | | | | | | | | DNS | DNS | 0 |
| Pos | Rider | Bike | DON (England) | | SIL (England) | | SNE (England) | | OUL (England) | | BRH (England) | | THR (England) | | OUL (England) | | KNO (Scotland) | | CAD (England) | | BRH (England) | | MAL (England) | | ROC (England) | | DON (England) | | Pts |

| Colour | Result |
|---|---|
| Gold | Winner |
| Silver | Second place |
| Bronze | Third place |
| Green | Points classification |
| Blue | Non-points classification |
| Blue | Non-classified finish (NC) |
| Purple | Retired, not classified (Ret) |
| Red | Did not qualify (DNQ) |
| Red | Did not pre-qualify (DNPQ) |
| Black | Disqualified (DSQ) |
| White | Did not start (DNS) |
| White | Withdrew (WD) |
| White | Race cancelled (C) |
| Blank | Did not practice (DNP) |
| Blank | Did not arrive (DNA) |
| Blank | Excluded (EX) |

=== Privateers' Championship ===
2001 Privateers' Championship
| Pos | Rider | Bike | DON (England) | | SIL (England) | | SNE (England) | | OUL (England) | | BRH (England) | | THR (England) | | OUL (England) | | KNO (Scotland) | | CAD (England) | | BRH (England) | | MAL (England) | | ROC (England) | | DON (England) | | Pts |
| Pos | Rider | Bike | R1 | R2 | R1 | R2 | R1 | R2 | R1 | R2 | R1 | R2 | R1 | R2 | R1 | R2 | R1 | R2 | R1 | R2 | R1 | R2 | R1 | R2 | R1 | R2 | R1 | R2 | Pts |
|---|---|---|---|---|---|---|---|---|---|---|---|---|---|---|---|---|---|---|---|---|---|---|---|---|---|---|---|---|---|
| 1 | (England) Shane Byrne | Suzuki | 7 | 8 | 9 | 9 | 6 | 6 | 4 | 8 | 5 | 4 | 8 | 5 | Ret | 8 | 8 | 6 | 7 | Ret | 8 | 8 | Ret | 7 | Ret | 5 | 7 | 7 | 550 |
| 2 | (England) Lee Jackson | Yamaha | 14 | 11 | 11 | 11 | 9 | 10 | 16 | 9 | 8 | 8 | 10 | 10 | 10 | 11 | Ret | 8 | 9ss | 7 | Ret | 10 | 8 | 10 | 6 | 7 | 9 | Ret | 396 |
| 3 | (England) Dean Ellison | Honda | 9 | 16 | 20 | 10 | 14 | Ret | Ret | Ret | 10 | 13 | 19 | 15 | 8 | 10 | 10 | Ret | 11 | 10 | 10 | 11 | 11 | Ret | 9 | 9 | 10 | 8 | 296 |
| 4 | (England) Nigel Nottingham | Yamaha | 12 | 17 | 12 | 13 | 13 | 13 | 10 | 13 | 12 | 9 | 17 | 12 | 11 | 12 | | | 17 | Ret | 17 | 15 | Ret | 15 | 8 | 11 | 13 | 11 | 266 |
| 5 | (England) Gorden Blackley | Kawasaki | 13 | 13 | 10 | 21 | 12 | 14 | 13 | 12 | 11 | 14 | 13 | 17 | 12 | 14 | 11 | 10 | 13 | 17 | 16 | 12 | 10 | 16 | Ret | 8 | 12 | Ret | 264 |
| 6 | (England) Dave Wood | Kawasaki | 18 | Ret | 13 | 14 | 10 | 11 | 9 | 11 | 7 | Ret | 16 | 16 | 9 | 9 | | | 10 | Ret | 11 | 18 | 12 | 14 | 7 | 12 | Ret | Ret | 250 |
| 7 | (England) Mark Burr | Kawasaki | Ret | Ret | 18 | 12 | 11 | 12 | 14 | 15 | 15 | Ret | 15 | 13 | | | 14 | 9 | 12 | 13 | 13 | Ret | 9 | 11 | 11 | 10 | 14 | 14 | 227 |
| 8 | (England) Jason Davis | Honda | 11 | 12 | 21 | 19 | Ret | DNS | 12 | 14 | 9 | 10 | 18 | 11 | Ret | 13 | | | 14 | 9 | 14 | DNS | Ret | 12 | | | 11 | 12 | 191 |
| 9 | (England) Paul Jones | Honda | | | 15 | 18 | 8 | 9 | 11 | 10 | Ret | DNS | 12 | 14 | Ret | Ret | | | 16 | 14 | 18 | 16 | 13 | DNS | Ret | Ret | 15 | 13 | 171 |
| 10 | (England) Steve Marks | Yamaha | Ret | 14 | 14 | 15 | 15 | 15 | 17 | 16 | Ret | 11 | 14 | Ret | 15 | 17 | | | 18 | 15 | 15 | 14 | 14 | Ret | 10 | Ret | Ret | Ret | 147 |
| 11 | (England) Peter Berwick | Honda | Ret | Ret | 16 | DNS | 16 | 16 | 19 | 18 | 14 | 15 | | | 14 | 18 | | | Ret | 16 | 20 | Ret | 15 | 13 | | | Ret | DNS | 90 |
| 12 | (England) Dave Redgate | Kawasaki | 17 | Ret | 17 | 16 | Ret | DNS | Ret | Ret | 13 | 12 | 13 | 16 | | | | | | | 19 | 17 | Ret | DNS | | | | | 74 |
| 13 | (England) Francis Williamson | Yamaha | 10 | 10 | Ret | 17 | Ret | DNS | 15 | 19 | | | | | | | | | | | | | | | | | | | 55 |
| 14 | (England) Brett Sampson | Yamaha | | | | | | | | | | | | | Ret | 15 | | | 15 | Ret | 12 | 13 | | | | | | | 40 |
| 15 | (England) Paul Jones | Kawasaki | 15 | 15 | 19 | 20 | | | | | | | | | | | | | | | | | | | | | | | 26 |
| 16 | (England) Carl Rennie | Kawasaki | 16 | Ret | | | | | 18 | 17 | | | Ret | DNS | | | | | | | | | | | | | | | 18 |
| Pos | Rider | Bike | DON (England) | | SIL (England) | | SNE (England) | | OUL (England) | | BRH (England) | | THR (England) | | OUL (England) | | KNO (Scotland) | | CAD (England) | | BRH (England) | | MAL (England) | | ROC (England) | | DON (England) | | Pts |

| Colour | Result |
|---|---|
| Gold | Winner |
| Silver | Second place |
| Bronze | Third place |
| Green | Points classification |
| Blue | Non-points classification |
| Blue | Non-classified finish (NC) |
| Purple | Retired, not classified (Ret) |
| Red | Did not qualify (DNQ) |
| Red | Did not pre-qualify (DNPQ) |
| Black | Disqualified (DSQ) |
| White | Did not start (DNS) |
| White | Withdrew (WD) |
| White | Race cancelled (C) |
| Blank | Did not practice (DNP) |
| Blank | Did not arrive (DNA) |
| Blank | Excluded (EX) |
