= Michael Rutter (motorcyclist) =

British motorcycle racer (born 1972)

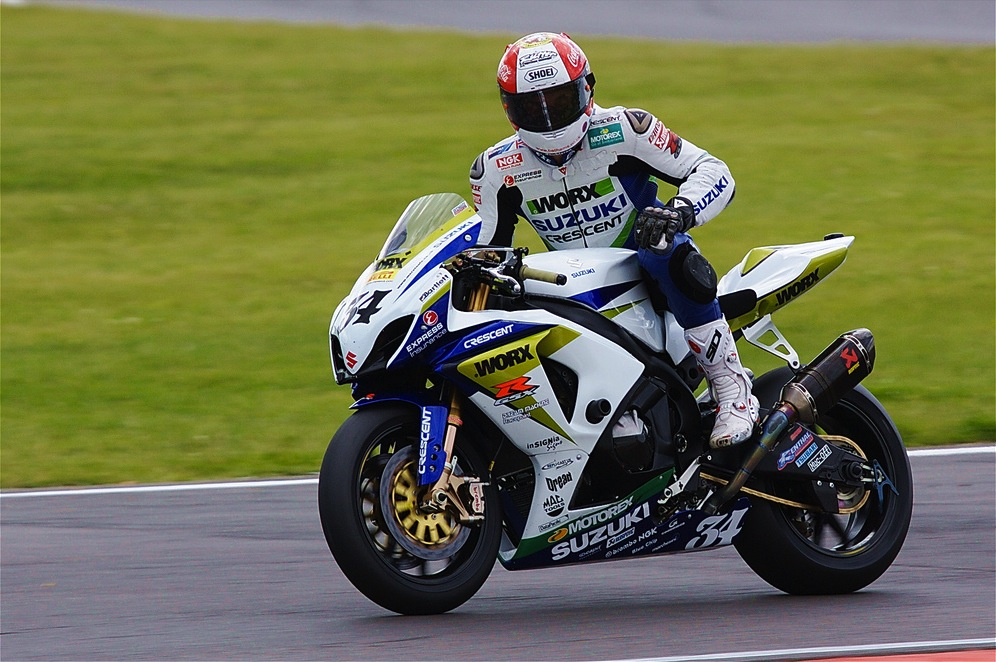
- Michael Rutter riding a Crescent Suzuki during the 2009 BSB at Snetterton
- Nationality: British
- Born: 18 April 1972 (age 54); Wordsley, Staffordshire, England
- Current team: Bathams Racing
- Bike number: 14
Motorcycle racing career statistics
British Superbike Championship
Active years	2001 – 2016
Manufacturers	Ducati, Honda, Kawasaki, Suzuki
Championships	0
Starts / Wins / Podiums / Poles / F. laps / Points; 431 / 29 / 109 / 9 / 0 / 1807
Isle of Man TT career
TTs contested	88
Active years	1994 – present
TT wins	7
First TT win	1998 TT JUNIOR TT
Last TT win	2019 TT Zero Race
TT podiums	18

Michael Karl Rutter (born 18 April 1972), nicknamed "the Blade", is a British motorcycle racer. He races in the National Superstock 1000 Championship aboard a BMW S1000RR. He has a reputation for being at his best in wet conditions and his favourite circuit is Oulton Park. He won 29 British Superbike Championship races with the most recent being at Silverstone in 2010, and finished as series runner-up twice. He has also contested in MotoGP, World Superbike, and the Mallory Park Race of the Year, where he won twice. He also cameoed in Coronation Street in 2008 as an extra, who put money in a slot machine and sat by the fireplace.

During 2015, Rutter was a temporary replacement rider for Gearlink Kawasaki in BSB, but mainly concentrated on selected road events backed by his personal sponsor Batham's brewery, having lost his 2014-ride on a Bathams IWR BMW partway through the season.

== Personal life ==
Rutter was born in Wordsley, Staffordshire, England. His father, Tony, was a successful motorcycle racer in the 1970s, winning 7 Isle of Man TT races, and four times world champion in the TT Formula Two series. Rutter lives in Bridgnorth, Shropshire.

In 2024, Glen Helen 1, a right corner on the Snaefell Mountain Course in the Isle of Man, was named Rutter's in recognition of the collective achievements of both Michael and Tony Rutter, tallying 14 TT wins and 38 podiums.

== Career ==
Rutter raced trials in his teens and began circuit racing in 1989. His first full season in the British Superbike Championship was 1993; he finished eighth overall and also made his first four World Superbike Championship starts that year. He finished in the overall BSB top-six every year from 1994 to 1998, coming in third overall in 1997. His win at Donington Park in the wet in 1995 broke the duopoly of Steve Hislop and Jamie Whitham. His first World Superbike podium came at the same circuit in 1997. He won at Oulton Park and Donington in 1998. Tellingly, each of these standout results was achieved in wet conditions.

Rutter spent 1999 in the 500cc World Championship, scoring occasional points but not being among the front runners. He returned to the domestic series for 2000 on a Ray Stringer private Yamaha. Again, a wet race provided his only victory. Still, his road racing results dwarfed what he managed on track.

After a solid 2001, Rutter came second to Steve Hislop in 2002 with the renegade Ducati team, including eight wins and five poles. He was third for the team in 2003, this time dwarfed by Shane Byrne.

Rutter spent 2004 and 2005 with the factory Honda team. In 2004, he was never off the front row and took 11 podiums in the first 12 races, but a midseason run of six non-podiums gave Suzuki's John Reynolds the title. In 2005, Honda team-mate Ryuichi Kiyonari had the better of Rutter, who came third overall and lost the ride for 2006.

For 2006, Rutter rejoined his former Monstermob boss Paul Bird, now running semi-works Hondas with Eddie Stobart funding. He finished third first time out, but only repeated this feat once more throughout the season, finishing seventh overall and losing the ride after the 2006 season. For 2007, Rutter was the sole rider for the MSS Discovery Kawasaki squad, which moved up from British Supersport to contest British Superbikes for the second time (the first was with Julien da Costa in 2005). This was his least successful BSB season ever, as the Kawasaki was not a competitive bike.

Rutter competed in the 2008 British Superbike Championship on a "North West 200" branded Ducati SBK RS08, a team entered to promote this famed road racing event in Northern Ireland. He finished sixth overall with a single win, and made his 300th BSB start at the final meeting of the year.

In 2009, Rutter rode for Rob Mac Racing Yamaha. The partnership was comparatively short-lived with Rutter leaving the team in May 2009. Rutter raced various machines for the rest of the season, with little success.

For 2010, Rutter took his Bathams Brewery sponsorship to the Ridersmotorcycles.com team, partnering Martin Jessopp on their Ducatis. He scored the team's first win at Knockhill, in wet conditions. He also led race two at Snetterton, but was stopped by a broken gear lever. He took pole at the Brands Hatch Grand Prix circuit, and was leading race one when it was stopped for rain, ultimately coming second to Alastair Seeley.

== Road racing ==
Rutter is also a road racing rider, having won 14 times at the North West 200 festival in Northern Ireland. He has seven wins at the Isle of Man TT races, five of which were in the TT Zero class.

=== Macau Grand Prix ===
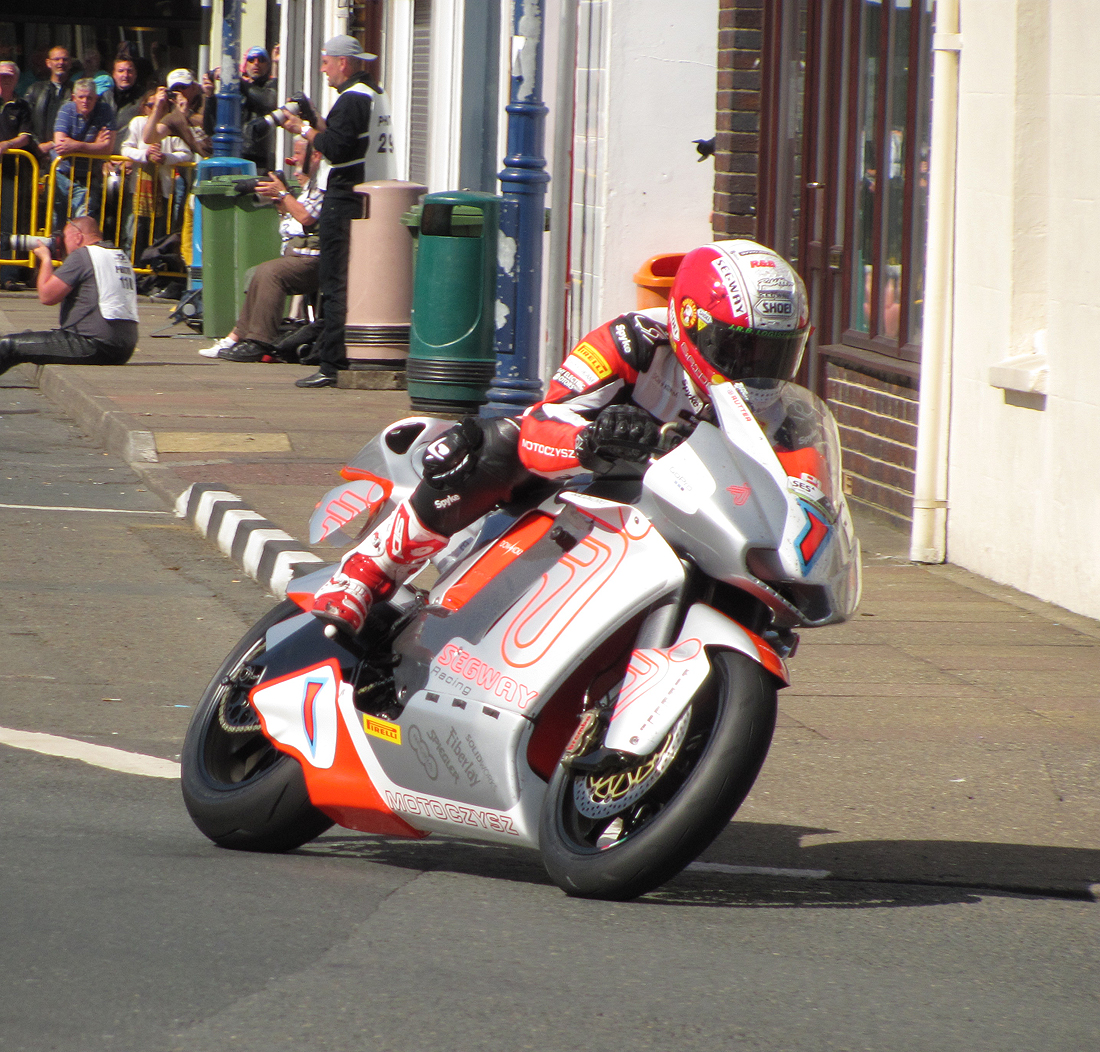
Rutter on the electric MotoCzysz exiting Ramsey during 2012 TT Zero race

Rutter holds the record of most wins at the Macau Grand Prix. In November 2018, Rutter came second, riding a Honda RC213V provided by his new sponsor, Faye Ho, granddaughter of Macau-based businessman Stanley Ho. The race was won by Peter Hickman on his usual Smith's BMW S1000RR, but also sponsored for the event by Ho's business, Aspire-Ho.

=== Isle of Man ===
On 4 June 2012, Rutter became the first person to lap the Isle of Man Mountain Course at over 100 mph on an electric motorcycle. His lap time was 22 min 05.05 sec (average speed 102.50 mph) however he did not win the £10,000 prize for this feat as the time was set in a practice session and not in a race. In the previous year's TT Zero race, he had narrowly missed out on the prize with a lap at an average speed of 99.604 mph. On 6 June, Rutter broke the 100 mph barrier in the TT Zero race winning with a lap time of 21:45.33, averaging 104.056 mph.

== Career record ==
=== Road racing ===
1995

- 2nd, North West 200

1996

- 1st, North West 200
- 3rd, IOM Formula One TT

1997

- 2nd, IOM Formula One TT
- 3rd, IOM Junior TT

1998

- 1st, Macau GP
- 1st, North West 200
- 1st, IOM Junior TT
- 2nd, IOM Formula One TT

2000

- 2nd, IOM Formula One TT
- 2nd, IOM Senior TT
- 3rd, IOM Production 1000 TT
- 1st, Macau GP (Formula One)
- 1st, Macau GP (Senior)
- 1st, North West 200
- 1st, North West 200
- 1st, North West 200

2002

- 1st, Macau GP

2003

- 1st, North West 200
- 1st, Macau GP

2004

- 1st, North West 200
- 1st, Macau GP

2005

- 1st, North West 200
- 1st, Macau GP

2006

- 2nd, North West 200
- 2nd, Macau GP

2008

- 1st, North West 200
- 2nd, Macau GP

2011

- 1st, IOM TT Zero
- 1st, Macau GP

2012

- 1st, IOM TT Zero
- 3rd, IOM TT Supertwins
- 1st, Macau GP

2013

- 1st, IOM TT Zero

2015

- 3rd, IOM TT Supertwins

2017

- 2nd, NW200 Supertwin 1
- 2nd, NW200 Superbike 1
- 1st, NW200 Supertwin 2
- 3rd, NW200 Superstock 2
- 1st, IOM TT Supertwin

2018

- 1st, IOM TT Zero
- 3rd, IOM TT Supertwin
- 2nd, Macau GP

=== Circuit racing ===
1991

- 3rd, Superteen Championship

1992

- 3rd, National 250 GP Championship

1993

- 7th, British Superbike Championship

1994

- 6th, British Superbike Championship

1995

- 5th, British Superbike Championship

1996

- 4th, British Superbike Championship

1997

- 3rd, British Superbike Championship
- 21st, World Superbike Championship

1998

- 6th, British Superbike Championship

1999

- 27th, World 500 GP Championship

2000

- 9th, British Superbike Championship

2001

- 6th, British Superbike Championship
- 1st, Mallory Park Race of the Year

2002

- 2nd, British Superbike Championship

2003

- 3rd, British Superbike Championship
- 1st, Mallory Park Race of the Year

2004

- 2nd, British Superbike Championship

2005

- 3rd, British Superbike Championship

2006

- 7th, British Superbike Championship

2007

- 12th, British Superbike Championship

2008

- 6th, British Superbike Championship

2009

- 16th, British Superbike Championship

2010

- 5th, British Superbike Championship

2011

- 8th, British Superbike Championship

2012

- 19th, British Superbike Championship

2013

- 18th, British Superbike Championship

2014

- 18th, British Superbike Championship

2015

- 31st, British Superbike Championship

2016

- 4th, National Superstock 1000 Championship

=== Superbike World Championship ===
==== Races by year ====
(key) (Races in bold indicate pole position, races in italics indicate fastest lap)

Year	Bike	1		2		3		4		5		6		7		8		9		10		11		12		Pos	Pts
Year	Bike	R1	R2	R1	R2	R1	R2	R1	R2	R1	R2	R1	R2	R1	R2	R1	R2	R1	R2	R1	R2	R1	R2	R1	R2	Pos	Pts
1997	Honda	AUS	AUS	SMR	SMR	GBR	GBR	GER	GER	ITA	ITA	USA	USA	EUR; 11	EUR; 3	AUT	AUT	NED	NED	SPA	SPA	JPN	JPN	INA	INA	21st	21

=== Grand Prix motorcycle racing ===
==== Races by year ====
(key) (Races in bold indicate pole position) (Races in italics indicate fastest lap)

Year	Class	Bike	1	2	3	4	5	6	7	8	9	10	11	12	13	14	15	16	Pos.	Pts
1999	500cc	Honda	MAL; Ret	JPN; 18	SPA; 17	FRA; Ret	ITA; Ret	CAT; Ret	NED; Ret	GBR; 11	GER; Ret	CZE; Ret	IMO; Ret	VAL; 16	AUS; Ret	RSA; Ret	BRA; Ret	ARG; 19	27th	5

=== British Superbike Championship ===
==== Races by year ====
(key) (Races in bold indicate pole position, races in italics indicate fastest lap)

Year	Bike	1		2		3		4		5		6		7		8		9		10		11		12		13		Pos	Pts
Year	Bike	R1	R2	R1	R2	R1	R2	R1	R2	R1	R2	R1	R2	R1	R2	R1	R2	R1	R2	R1	R2	R1	R2	R1	R2	R1	R2	Pos	Pts
2001	Kawasaki	DON; 5	DON; 4	SIL; 6	SIL; 6	SNE; Ret	SNE; Ret	OUL; 6	OUL; 5	BRH; 4	BRH; 2	THR; 7	THR; 3	OUL; 6	OUL; 5	KNO; 13	KNO; 5	CAD; 6	CAD; Ret	BRH; 7	BRH; 6	MAL; Ret	MAL; Ret	ROC; 2	ROC; 1	DON; 6	DON; 3	6th	256
2004	Honda	**SIL**; 1	**SIL**; 3	BHI; 2	BHI; 2	**SNE**; 3	**SNE**; 2	OUL; 3	OUL; 3	**MON**; 20	**MON**; 1	THR; 1	THR; 2	BHGP; 5	BHGP; 14	KNO; 9	KNO; 4	MAL; 6	MAL; Ret	CRO; 1	CRO; 1	CAD; 1	CAD; Ret	**OUL**; 2	**OUL**; 2	DON; 2	DON; 2	2nd	417
2005	Honda	BHI; 4	BHI; 2	**THR**; 2	**THR**; 3	MAL; 1	MAL; 1	**OUL**; 1	**OUL**; 2	MOP; 2	MOP; 5	**CRO**; 2	**CRO**; 2	KNO; 2	KNO; 2	SNE; 5	SNE; 3	SIL; 15	SIL; 4	CAD; 8	CAD; Ret	OUL; 10	OUL; Ret	DON; 6	DON; 4	BHGP; 6	BHGP; 8	3rd	371

Year	Bike	1		2		3			4		5		6			7			8			9			10		11		12			13		Pos	Pts	Ref
Year	Bike	R1	R2	R1	R2	R1	R2	R3	R1	R2	R1	R2	R1	R2	R3	R1	R2	R3	R1	R2	R3	R1	R2	R3	R1	R2	R1	R2	R1	R2	R3	R1	R2	Pos	Pts	Ref
2006	Honda	BHI; 3	BHI; Ret	DON; 7	DON; Ret	THR; 6	THR; 7		OUL; 9	OUL; 6	MOP; C	MOP; C	MAL; 6	MAL; 6		SNE; 7	SNE; Ret		KNO; 13	KNO; 10		OUL; 6	OUL; 7		CRO; 6	CRO; 6		CAD; Ret	CAD; Ret	SIL; 5	SIL; 7	BHGP; 3	BHGP; 8	7th	206	
2007	Yamaha	BHGP; 10	BHGP; 7	THR; 11	THR; 8	SIL; 10	SIL; 9		OUL; 15	OUL; 13	SNE; 11	SNE; Ret							OUL; Ret	OUL; 7		MAL; Ret	MAL; 8		CRO; 13	CRO; 8	CAD; 11	CAD; 10	DON; 9	DON; 8		BHI; 8	BHI; 10	12th	104	
2008	Ducati	THR; 3	THR; 3	OUL; 4	OUL; 6	BHGP; Ret	BHGP; 5		DON; 8	DON; 8	SNE; 9	SNE; 4	MAL; Ret	MAL; 1		OUL; 7	OUL; 11		KNO; 4	KNO; 2		CAD; 6	CAD; 5		CRO; 6	CRO; 6	SIL; 4	SIL; 7	BHI; 7	BHI; 6				6th	256	
2009	Yamaha	BHI; 16	BHI; 17	OUL; 17	OUL; Ret																													16th	66	
2009	Suzuki								THR; 5	THR; 5	SNE; 7	SNE; Ret	KNO; 11	KNO; Ret																				16th	66	
2009	Honda															MAL; 4	MAL; 6																	16th	66	
2009	Kawasaki																		BHGP; 10	BHGP; Ret	BHGP; 10													16th	66	
2009	Ducati																										SIL; Ret	SIL; 15	OUL; 12	OUL; 8	OUL; Ret			16th	66	
2010	Ducati	BHI; 7	BHI; 6	THR; 5	THR; 7	OUL; Ret	OUL; 2		CAD; 3	CAD; 4	MAL; 4	MAL; 4	KNO; 1	KNO; C		SNE; 4	SNE; Ret	SNE; 4	BHGP; **2**	BHGP; 3	BHGP; 3	CAD; 5	CAD; 5		CRO; 23	CRO; 5	SIL; 1	SIL; Ret	**OUL**; **Ret**	OUL; 4	OUL; Ret			5th	559^{1}	
2011	Ducati	BHI; 6	BHI; 7	OUL; 11	OUL; 6	CRO; Ret	CRO; 8		THR; 2	THR; Ret	KNO; Ret	KNO; 9	SNE; 13	SNE; DNS		OUL; 3	OUL; C		BHGP; 2	BHGP; 5	BHGP; 5	CAD; Ret^{2}	CAD; Ret	CAD; DNS	DON	DON	SIL; 8	SIL; 8	BHGP; 7	BHGP; Ret	BHGP; 7			8th	164	
2012	Kawasaki	BHI; 3	BHI; C	THR; Ret	THR; Ret	OUL; 8	OUL; Ret	OUL; 15	SNE; 14	SNE; 13	KNO; 10	KNO; Ret	OUL; 14	OUL; Ret	OUL; 16	BHGP; 10	BHGP; 17		CAD; 11	CAD; 10		DON; 22	DON; 14		ASS; 17	ASS; 19	SIL; 18	SIL; 16	BHGP; 13	BHGP; 18	BHGP; 15			19th	61	

Year	Make	1		2		3		4		5		6		7			8		9		10		11		12			Pos	Pts
Year	Make	R1	R2	R1	R2	R1	R2	R1	R2	R1	R2	R1	R2	R1	R2	R3	R1	R2	R1	R2	R1	R2	R1	R2	R1	R2	R3	Pos	Pts
2013	Honda	BHI; Ret	BHI; Ret	THR; 8	THR; 5	OUL; Ret	OUL; Ret	KNO; 12	KNO; Ret	SNE; Ret	SNE; DNS	BHGP; 10	BHGP; 11	OUL; 13	OUL; 18	OUL; Ret	CAD; Ret	CAD; 13	DON; 14	DON; 15	ASS	ASS	SIL; 16	SIL; 18	BHGP; 10	BHGP; Ret	BHGP; Ret	18th	49
2014	BMW	BHI; 12	BHI; 17	OUL; 11	OUL; 12	SNE; Ret	SNE; 14	KNO; 13	KNO; 10	BHGP; DNS	BHGP; DNS	THR; 9	THR; DNS	OUL; Ret	OUL; 11	OUL; 11	CAD; 19	CAD; 10	DON; 16	DON; Ret	ASS	ASS	SIL	SIL	BHGP	BHGP	BHGP	18th	47

Year	Make	1		2		3		4		5		6		7		8		9			10		11		12			Pos	Pts
Year	Make	R1	R2	R1	R2	R1	R2	R1	R2	R1	R2	R1	R2	R1	R2	R1	R2	R1	R2	R3	R1	R2	R1	R2	R1	R2	R3	Pos	Pts
2015	Kawasaki	DON	DON	BHI; Ret	BHI; 27	OUL; 22	OUL; Ret	SNE	SNE	KNO; 13	KNO; 18	BHGP; Ret	BHGP; Ret	THR	THR	CAD	CAD	OUL	OUL	OUL	ASS	ASS	SIL	SIL	BHGP	BHGP	BHGP	31st	3
2017	BMW	DON; DNS	DON; DNS	BHI	BHI	OUL	OUL	KNO	KNO	SNE	SNE	BHGP	BHGP	THR; Ret	THR; Ret	CAD	CAD	SIL	SIL	SIL	OUL	OUL	ASS	ASS	BHGP; DNS	BHGP; Ret	BHGP; 20	NC	0

1. – Rutter qualified for "The Showdown" part of the BSB season, thus before the Croft round he was awarded 500 points plus the podium credits he had gained throughout the season. Podium credits are given to anyone finishing 1st, 2nd or 3rd, with 3,2 and 1 points awarded respectively.

2. – Josh Brookes collided with Rutter, causing Rutter to suffer broken ribs and miss the following 4 races.

== Bibliography ==
- Rutter, Michael; McGuinness, John (9 November 2020). Michael Rutter: The Life of a Racer. Mortons Media Group. ISBN 978-1911639367.

Sporting positions
Preceded by Andreas Hofmann	Macau Motorcycle Grand Prix; Winner; 1998	Succeeded by David Jefferies
Preceded by David Jefferies	Macau Motorcycle Grand Prix; Winner; 2000	Succeeded by John McGuinness
Preceded by John McGuinness	Macau Motorcycle Grand Prix; Winner; 2002–2005	Succeeded by Steve Plater
Preceded by Stuart Easton	Macau Motorcycle Grand Prix; Winner; 2011–2012	Succeeded by Ian Hutchinson
