= Dean Ellison =

British motorcycle racer

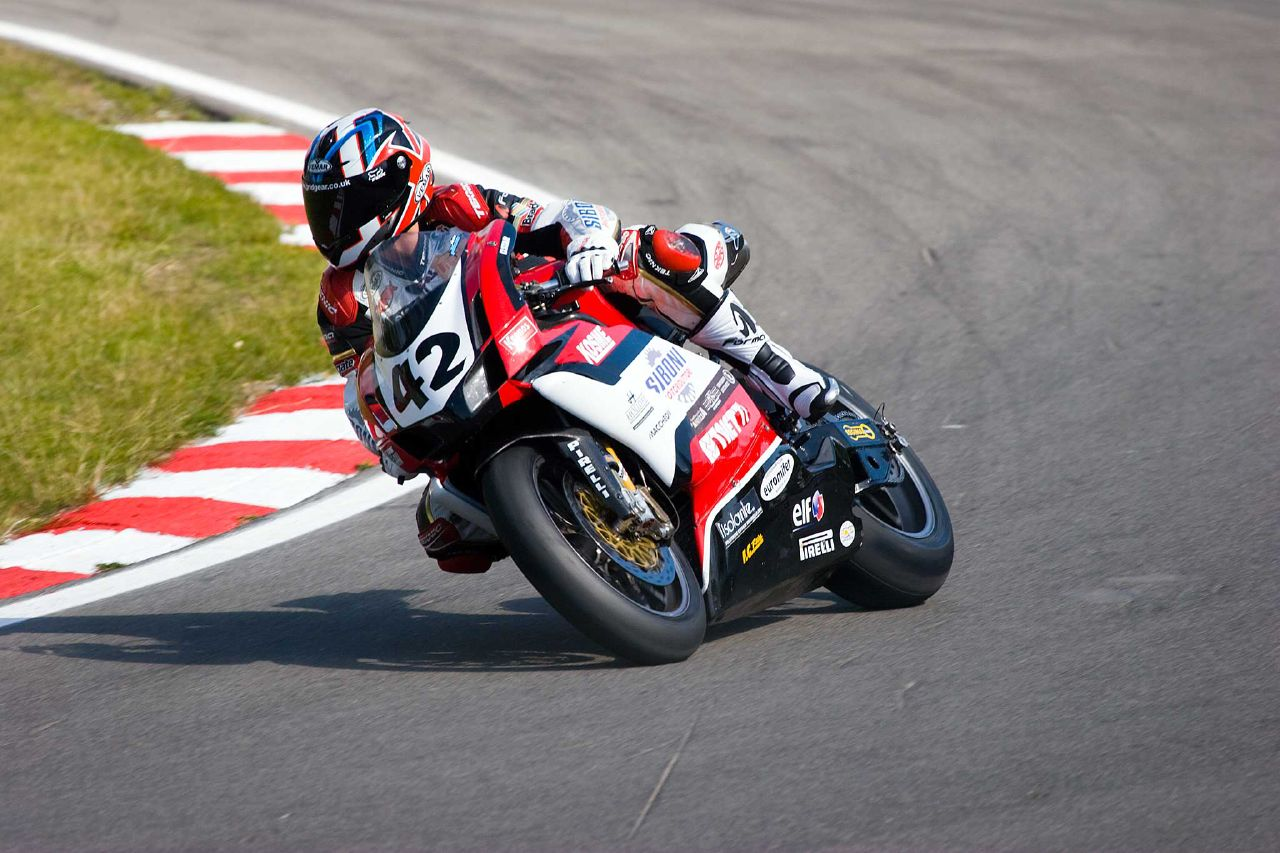
- Ellison on a race track in 2007
- Nationality: British
- Born: 14 November 1977 (age 49); Lancaster, Lancashire
- Current team: Team Quattro Spirit
- Bike number: 42
- Website: Dean Ellison
Motorcycle racing career statistics
Superbike World Championship
Active years	8
Manufacturers	3
Championships	0
2008 championship position
Starts / Wins / Podiums / Poles / F. laps / Points; / 0 / 0 / 0 / 0

Dean Bruce Ellison (born 14 November 1977 in Lancaster, Lancashire) is a British former motorcycle racer. He is the older brother of James Ellison, previously a Moto GP and British Superbike rider.

== Early career ==
Ellison started racing in 1996. In 1997, he entered the Superteen British Championship, finishing the season with a number of podiums. In 1998, he competed in the Aprilia 250cc Challenge, regularly finishing in the top-five. Halfway through the season, he was offered the chance to ride in the 250cc British Championship for D&B Racing, which at the time was his dream.

After proving that Ellison could be a contender in the British Championship, D&B owner Danny Gallacher asked him to ride his new 250cc Honda in the 1999 championship. This gave Ellison the opportunity to run in the top five and at the end of the season he was asked to ride a Superbike as a one-off in the British Superbike Championship.

== Superbike racing ==
D&B Racing then made the switch to Superbike and asked Ellison to go with them, and in 2000 they contested the British Superbike Cup, Ellison learning his trade on a race-kitted Honda VTR-1000 SP-1. 2001 brought in more consistent results and a hard earned 12th place in the overall British Superbike Championship.

In 2002, equipped with a factory Ducati along with support from Ducati Corse, Ellison had an exciting year getting to grips with the Ducati. At the end of 2002, he was tenth in the British Superbike Championship and was desperate to get racing again in 2003. During the off-season Ellison continued to race – taking in Supermoto, motocross and endurance racing, simply to keep on a bike and improve his riding.

2003 brought mixed emotions with top-ten results (notably the May Bank Holiday round at Oulton Park) in British and World Superbike rounds and the frustration of mechanical failures and lack of power compared to the opposition.

At the beginning of 2004, Ellison was left without a British Superbike ride after D&B Racing pulled out at the last minute. He was asked to help Phase One retain the World Endurance Championship, which Ellison had helped them win in 2003. By March 2004 Ellison had started developing Yamaha's brand new R1 in preparation for the first race in April. Along the way, he competed for RP Bikes Suzuki in the British Superstock Championship, and for IRT Honda in the World Supersport.

In 2005, Ellison took over his brother's former ride in the Jentin Racing Yamaha BSB team, without the same success. He left mid-season to join the Slingshot Racing team. His 2006 season with the SMT Honda team was wrecked by a crash at Oulton Park in which Dean picked up a serious knee injury.

For 2007, Ellison raced one of Donato Pedercini's Ducatis in the Superbike World Championship, usually well down the order. Due to lack of power, his season was plagued with mechanical failures.

Ellison returned to Britain for 2008, aboard the Co-ordit Yamaha. Ellison missed the rescheduled Brands Hatch round after a high-speed horror crash at Oulton Park. He took his first double point scoring finish of the season at Donington Park whilst still riding injured.

In 2015, Ellison raced with Phil Seton for Seton Tuning and won the No Limits Endurance Championship and the overall win at Donington.

== Personal life ==
Ellison lived in Kendal throughout his childhood, moving to various places while pursuing his dream to become a professional racer. After leaving school he studied to be a motorcycle and motor vehicle mechanic, gaining all qualifications with distinction.

In 1998, Ellison settled down in the Midlands in Leicester until 2009 with his wife Susie, whom he married on 28 December 2008. He is the older brother of James Ellison and was James' biggest fan, working behind the scenes to find new sponsors.

Ellison is still very active within the motorcycle world, working as an area sales representative for accident claims based in Ormskirk. He plays football, runs and still attends motorcycle track days, supermoto events and has confirmed his desire to race.

Always respected for his fund raising efforts, Ellison still takes time out to do his bit for charity. In 2011, he teamed up with Dave Winter and filmmaker Ben Barden to travel over 1000 miles in one go, raising money for his two charities, Riders and CJ Riders Fund.

== Career statistics ==
=== Superstock European Championship ===
==== Races by year ====
(key) (Races in bold indicate pole position) (Races in italics indicate fastest lap)

Year	Bike	1	2	3	4	5	6	7	8	9	Pos	Pts
2000	Honda	DON	MNZ	HOC	SMR	VAL	BRA	OSC	NED	BRA2; 12	32nd	13

=== British Superbike Championship ===
(key) (Races in bold indicate pole position; races in italics indicate fastest lap)

Year	Class	Bike	1		2		3		4		5		6		7		8		9		10		11		12		13		Pos	Pts
Year	Class	Bike	R1	R2	R1	R2	R1	R2	R1	R2	R1	R2	R1	R2	R1	R2	R1	R2	R1	R2	R1	R2	R1	R2	R1	R2	R1	R2	Pos	Pts
2001	BSB	Honda	DON; 9	DON; 16	SIL; 20	SIL; 10	SNE; 14	SNE; Ret	OUL; Ret	OUL; Ret	BRH; 10	BRH; 13	THR; 19	THR; 15	OUL; 8	OUL; 10	KNO; 10	KNO	CAD; 11	CAD; 10	BRH; 10	BRH; 11	MAL; 11	MAL; Ret	ROC; 9	ROC; 9	DON; 10	DON; 8	12th	100
2004	BSB	Ducati	SIL; Ret	SIL; 14	BHI	BHI	SNE	SNE	OUL	OUL	MON	MON	THR	THR	BHGP	BHGP	KNO	KNO	MAL	MAL	CRO	CRO	CAD	CAD	OUL	OUL	DON	DON	33rd	2
2006	BSB	Honda	BHI	BHI	DON; 16	DON; 14	THR; Ret	THR; Ret	OUL; Ret	OUL; 22	MON; C	MON; C	MAL; 16	MAL; 21	SNE; 17	SNE; 21	KNO; 20	KNO; 18	OUL	OUL	CRO	CRO	CAD	CAD	SIL; 14	SIL; 18	BHGP; 14	BHGP; Ret	28th	6

Year	Bike	1			2			3			4			5			6			7			8			9			10			11			12			Pos	Pts
Year	Bike	R1	R2	R3	R1	R2	R3	R1	R2	R3	R1	R2	R3	R1	R2	R3	R1	R2	R3	R1	R2	R3	R1	R2	R3	R1	R2	R3	R1	R2	R3	R1	R2	R3	R1	R2	R3	Pos	Pts
2008	Yamaha	THR; 21	THR; 15		OUL; Ret	OUL; Ret		BHGP	BHGP		DON; 14	DON; 15		SNE; 17	SNE; 15		MAL; 14	MAL; 18		OUL; 14	OUL; 16		KNO; Ret	KNO; 19		CAD; Ret	CAD; DNS		CRO	CRO		SIL	SIL		BHI	BHI		25th	9

=== FIM Endurance World Championship ===
==== By team ====
Year	Team	Bike	Rider	TC
2004	(United Kingdom) Suzuki GB - Phase One	Suzuki GSX-R1000	(United Kingdom) James Ellison (United States) Jason Pridmore (United Kingdom) Andy Notman (United Kingdom) Dean Ellison (United States) Josh Hayes (France) Olivier Four (Sweden) Jimmy Lindstrom	1st
