= John Reynolds (motorcyclist) =

British motorcycle racer

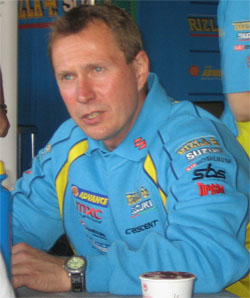
- Reynolds in 2005
- Nationality: British
- Born: 27 June 1963 (age 63); Nottingham, England
Motorcycle racing career statistics
Grand Prix motorcycle racing
Active years	1993–1994
First race	1993 500cc Australian Grand Prix
Last race	1994 500cc European Grand Prix
Starts / Wins / Podiums / Poles / F. laps / Points; 27 / 0 / 0 / 0 / 0 / 85
Superbike World Championship
Active years	1991–1992, 1995–2001, 2003
Manufacturers	Kawasaki, Ducati, Suzuki
Starts / Wins / Podiums / Poles / F. laps / Points; 81 / 1 / 4 / 1 / 1 / 471
British Superbike Championship
Active years	1990–1992, 1997–2005
Starts / Wins / Podiums / Poles / F. laps / Points; 202 / 37 / 117 / 18 / 15 / 1456

John Stephen Reynolds (born 27 June 1963) is a British former professional motorcycle racer from Kimberley, Nottinghamshire, England. He won the British Superbike Championship in 1992, 2001 and 2004 and the Race of the Year in 1992 and 2022.

Reynolds is an all-time great of BSB with his 37 career wins bettered only by Shane Byrne and Ryuichi Kiyonari. His 117 podiums is second all-time behind Byrne. He scored this in 202 starts, making him one of a select few riders to finish on the podium in over half their career starts.

== Career ==
Reynolds' first domestic success led him into the 500 cc World Championship on a Padgetts Harris-Yamaha, taking eight top-ten finishes over two seasons. He joined Revé Kawasaki in World Superbike for 1995, qualifying second at Brands Hatch and taking third-place finishes there and Assen, en route to tenth overall. In 1996, he rode a Suzuki to 12th overall. Although he never did a full season of international racing again, he had a strong record as an occasional rider in future years, taking a win at Brands Hatch in 2000 and a pole position in 2003.

In 1997, Reynolds returned to Revé, now running Ducatis in the reformed British Superbike series with Red Bull backing. He was immediately a front-runner, finishing in the championship top-five each year between 1997 and 2000. He took 13 BSB wins in those seasons, and scored points in every BSB race in 2000.

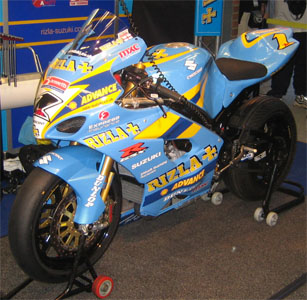
The number one plate on JR's 2005 Rizla Suzuki

The dominant riders in 2000, together with Reynolds, had been Neil Hodgson and Chris Walker. With these two having moved on, the stage was set for Reynolds and Steve Hislop to duel in 2001, as only John’s team-mate, Sean Emmett, and Michael Rutter also won races. Reynolds’s second championship came when Hislop was injured in a collision between the two men.

For 2002, Reynolds moved to Suzuki's new 1000 cc four-cylinder bike, taking a win and six further podiums en route to sixth overall. He was championship runner-up in 2003, but was the fastest man by the end of the season. A run of 11 consecutive podiums at the start of 2004 made the title his to lose, and despite a less successful second half of the season he secured the title in the final round.

Reynolds broke his leg in testing before the 2005 season. After a poor season, Reynolds had a serious accident at the final round at Brands Hatch during practice on 7 October, breaking four ribs on his right side, puncturing his right lung and breaking his left collarbone, and suffered injuries to his neck and back. Reynolds commented from hospital: "When I hit the barrier it was like a switch in my head flipped. Instantly I knew it was time to stop. I had received a warning with my broken leg earlier in the year. I see this as a final warning and I’ve made the decision to stop racing, more for my wife Shelley’s sanity and for the good of my family than for me."

After recovery, Reynolds took up a background role with Rizla Suzuki.

== Career statistics ==
=== Grand Prix motorcycle racing ===
==== Races by year ====
(key) (Races in bold indicate pole position, races in italics indicate fastest lap)

Year	Class	Bike	1	2	3	4	5	6	7	8	9	10	11	12	13	14	Pos	Pts
1994	500cc	Harris-Yamaha	AUS; 10	MAL; 12	JPN; 12	SPA; 10	AUT; 10	GER; 10	NED; Ret	ITA; Ret	FRA; Ret	GBR; 14	CZE; 12	USA; Ret	ARG; Ret	EUR; 11	14th	43

=== Superbike World Championship ===
==== Races by year ====
(key) (Races in bold indicate pole position) (Races in italics indicate fastest lap)

Year	Make	1		2		3		4		5		6		7		8		9		10		11		12		13		Pos.	Pts
Year	Make	R1	R2	R1	R2	R1	R2	R1	R2	R1	R2	R1	R2	R1	R2	R1	R2	R1	R2	R1	R2	R1	R2	R1	R2	R1	R2	Pos.	Pts
1995	Kawasaki	GER; 17	GER; Ret	SMR; 7	SMR; 9	GBR; 7	GBR; 11	ITA; 9	ITA; 10	SPA; 12	SPA; 8	AUT; Ret	AUT; Ret	USA; 16	USA; Ret	EUR; 4	EUR; 3	JPN; 9	JPN; 12	NED; 6	NED; 3	INA; 9	INA; 9	AUS; 5	AUS; 7			10th	155

=== British Superbike Championship ===
Year	Bike	1		2		3		4		5		6		7		8		9		10		11		12		13		Pos	Pts
Year	Bike	R1	R2	R1	R2	R1	R2	R1	R2	R1	R2	R1	R2	R1	R2	R1	R2	R1	R2	R1	R2	R1	R2	R1	R2	R1	R2	Pos	Pts
2001	Ducati	DON; 1	DON; 1	SIL; 1	SIL; 2	SNE; 1	SNE; 1	OUL; 2	OUL; 2	BRH; 2	BRA; Ret	THR; 4	THR; 1	OUL; 2	OUL; 2	KNO; 1	KNO; 1	CAD; 3	CAD; 2	BRH; 2	BRH; 1	MAL; 1	MAL; 5	ROC; 3	ROC; 2	DON; 1	DON; 1	1st	536
2004	Suzuki	SIL; 3	SIL; 1	BHI; 1	BHI; 3	SNE; 2	SNE; 1	**OUL**; 2	**OUL**; 2	MON; 2	MON; 2	THR; 2	THR; Ret	BHGP; 1	BHGP; 7	**KNO**; 4	**KNO**; 3	MAL; 1	MAL; 2	CRO; 5	CRO; 3	CAD; Ret	CAD; 8	OUL; 1	OUL; 1	DON; 3	DON; 6	1st	446
2005	Suzuki	BHI; 9	BHI; 9	THR; 14	THR; Ret	MAL	MAL	OUL	OUL	MOP	MOP	CRO; Ret	CRO; 12	KNO; 7	KNO; 6	SNE; 3	SNE; 4	SIL; 3	SIL; Ret	CAD; 12	CAD; 8	OUL; 3	OUL; 3	DON; 5	DON; Ret	BHGP	BHGP	9th	139

== Bibliography ==
- Reynolds, John; McClean, Jason (2006). John Reynolds: The Autobiography. Sparkford, Yeovil, Somerset: Haynes Publishing. ISBN 978-1844253555.
