= British Superbike Championship =

British road racing superbike competition

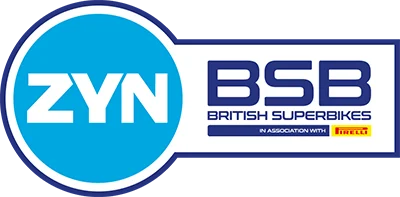
- The official British Superbike logo from 2026
- Category: Motorcycle sport
- Country: United Kingdom
- Inaugural season: 1988
- Riders: 26 (2026)
- Teams: 18 (2026)
- Constructors: 6 (Aprilia, BMW, Ducati, Honda, Kawasaki, Yamaha)
- Tyre suppliers: Pirelli
- Riders' champion: Kyle Ryde (2026)
- Teams' champion: Nitrous Competitions Racing Ducati (2026)
- Official website: britishsuperbike.com/

The British Superbike Championship (BSB), from 2026 known for sponsorship reasons as the ZYN British Superbike Championship, is a road racing championship for superbike class machines in the United Kingdom and acknowledged as the premier domestic superbike racing series in the world.

The championship is managed and organised by MotorSport Vision, which also owns many of the circuits the series visits. The Series and Race Director is Stuart Higgs, with event marshals provided by the Racesafe Marshals Association.

The series typically races over twelve rounds from April to October, with the series concluding in a three-round 'Showdown', where the top six riders are awarded points based on their podium finishes from the previous nine rounds and then compete over three rounds and seven races for the title. The Showdown format was introduced in 2010 to prevent a rider from making a runaway victory in the championship.

From 2008, the championship followed the Superbike World Championship in appointing Pirelli as the single control tyre supplier.

== History ==
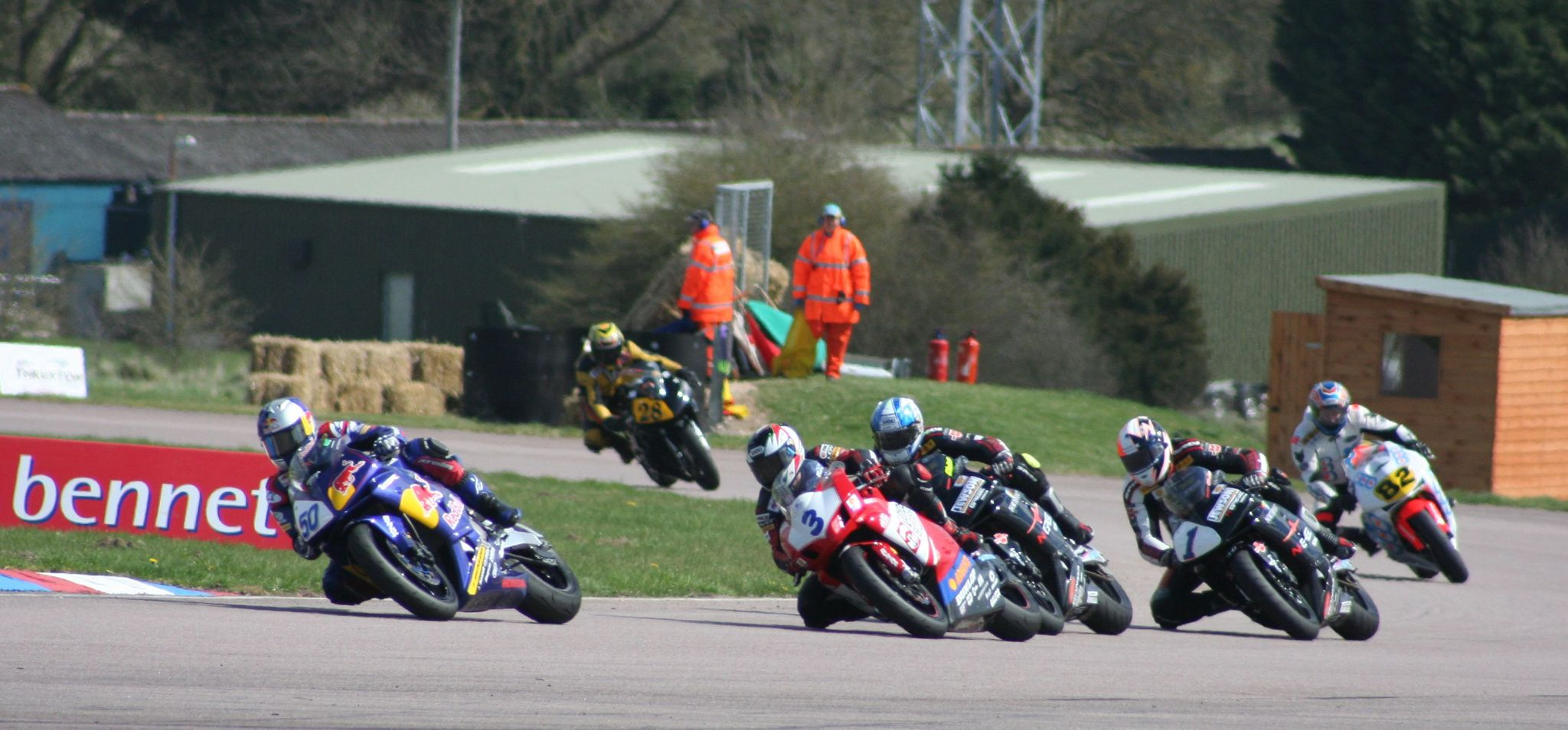
2006 British Supersport Race at Thruxton Circuit

The official British Superbike logo (2008–2017)

The British Superbike Championship began in 1988, with bikes conforming to 750cc TT Formula I regulations, which the championship used through to 1993, when Superbike regulations were adopted.

Niall Mackenzie was the most successful rider of the 1990s, with three titles. Other past champions include Neil Hodgson, Australian Troy Bayliss and Steve Hislop. Chris 'the Stalker' Walker has finished as runner-up 4 times. Many riders from the series have gone on to race in the Superbike World Championship or MotoGP.

The 2006 British Superbike Championship was won by Ryuichi Kiyonari, in what was one of the most exciting climaxes to a British Superbike season in years. Kiyonari fought off the challenge of Ducati powered Leon Haslam and Gregorio Lavilla at the final round in Brands Hatch in front of a capacity crowd and a reported 1.5 million live TV viewers, with Kiyonari and Haslam each winning one race, and Lavilla crashing and having an engine problem in both races.

The 2009 British Superbike Championship was mainly dominated by the Yamaha of Leon Camier who set a new record of 14 race wins in a season at event eight of twelve, such was his domination of the championship, beating the previous record of 13 by Niall Mackenzie in the 1997 season. Guintoli, Brookes and Richards all missed races, allowing Stuart Easton of Hydrex Honda and Simon Andrews of MSS Colchester Kawasaki to challenge.

It was claimed that BSB was the biggest supported British racing series,

During 2009, 368,000 people attended BSB events across the country, and 8,000,000 fans watched 310 hours of television on the live Eurosport and delayed ITV coverage.

For 2010, the Privateers cup was replaced by the Evolution Class. MSVR stated that "It will be open to anyone in the series from the official manufacturer-backed teams through to independent entries and will allow homologated machines with full Superbike racing rolling chassis to retain the very important visual impression, but engines will have to be built to very stringent "Stock" regulations. Along with standard engines a series specified control ECU device that eliminates any form of traction control, launch control and anti-wheelie devices will be compulsory".

Qualifying was also altered, with the "Roll for Pole" only setting the grid for race one of each weekend. This is due to the race two grid being set by the fastest laps of each rider in race one. Also introduced is a "second chance" system if a rider crashes on lap one, that rider will only drop eight places from where they started the first race. At the pair of triple-race meetings, the same rules apply for race two, but will also be applied for race three.

=== Playoff Era (2010–present) ===
Perhaps the biggest rule change was the dividing of the championship into two parts, similar to the system used in two major automobile racing series in the United States – the NASCAR Chase, and National Hot Rod Association's Countdown to the Championship.

The first nine meetings (19 races) form the "Main Season" of the championship, before the final three meetings (seven races) make up "The Showdown". The championship change has been introduced after Leon Camier clinched the 2009 title with four races to spare, thus introducing a crescendo of competition.

The normal FIM point-scoring system still applies, with 25 for the winner and a single point for 15th. At the end of the Main Season, all riders then drop their two worst scores, which must be from events they have at least qualified for. From this points order, the first six riders in the championship standings will be elevated to a new base level and become the Title Fighters for the final three events and seven races of the championship.

The playoff format is similar to the 2007-10 NASCAR Playoff format used in their premiership, based on a six-rider format, but offering bonus points for any finish first to third, unlike NASCAR's format which only rewards wins. Each Title Fighter will start The Showdown with 500 points, plus additional points for each podium position they have obtained in the Main Season; 3 for a win, 2 for a second, and 1 for a third, termed "Podium Credits". Using the first nineteen races of Camier's 2009 campaign, Camier would have had 547 points due to his fifteen wins and a second place out of the first nineteen races of the season.

The standard points scoring format from the Main Season then continues for The Showdown, with all points scores from the final seven races counting. All riders outside of the Title Fighters continue to race for the BSB Riders' Cup, continuing to add to their points total from the end of the Main Season. This also applies to the new Evolution class.

For the 2012 season, MSVR announced a number of changes to the technical regulations to enhance the spectacle of the British Superbike Championship. The championship was to be limited to 32 entries, 16 two-bike teams. This was intended to be a way to reward the teams that have raced in BSB, year in, year out. Teams within the current BSB were invited to enter their two-bike teams initially, with teams that wish to graduate to the BSB class having to buy an entry.

For the 2014 season, the playoff bonus points system was changed. Riders earned five points for a win, three points for second, and one point for third.

For the 2021 season, the playoff system was adjusted again. Eight riders, up from six, will now compete in the playoff.

== Title sponsors ==
The initial sponsor was Motorcycle News (MCN) from the reintroduction of the British Superbike Series in 1996 which sponsored the Series until 2004. In 2000 Motorbikes4U (MB4U) was the top class sponsor with MCN remaining as a secondary sponsor until it returned as primary in 2002. From 2005 to 2008 Bennetts has had its first stint as title sponsor. From 2009 to 2017 it was MCE, after which again Bennetts (both insurance businesses) was the named sponsor from 2018 season until 2025. From early 2026, the new season sponsor was named as Zyn, a maker of a tobacco substitute product from Sweden, prompting concern from other series sponsors and controversy in the press. Tobacco-advertising in sport was discontinued by UK government in early 2000s.

== Circuits ==
Being a national championship, the British Superbike Championship has visited circuits throughout the United Kingdom, as well as European venues, over its history. In 2014, the series visits nine different tracks in England, Scotland and the Netherlands. These tracks are: Brands Hatch, Oulton Park, Snetterton Motor Racing Circuit, Knockhill Racing Circuit, Thruxton Circuit, Cadwell Park, Donington Park, TT Circuit Assen and Silverstone Circuit.

In the past, the BSB has visited Croft Circuit, Mallory Park and Rockingham Motor Speedway in England, Mondello Park in Ireland and Pembrey Circuit in Wales.

== Types of motorcycles used ==
Superbike racing motorcycles are derived from standard production models. In the past, however, manufacturers took advantage of loopholes in the rules to create "homologation specials" — motorcycles with low production numbers made especially for racing.

Motorcycles that raced in the British Superbike Championship include:

- BMW Motorrad: S1000RR M1000RR (currently)
- Ducati: Ducati 916/955, Ducati 996 RS, Ducati 998 RS, Ducati 998 F02, Ducati 999 F04, Ducati 1098, Ducati 1199, Ducati Panigale V4 (currently)
- Honda: RC30, RC45, RC51, CBR1000RR (currently)
- Kawasaki: ZXR750, ZX-7RR, ZX-10R, ZX-10RR (currently)
- Suzuki: GSX-R750, GSX-R1000 (currently)
- Yamaha: FZR750, YZF750, YZF-R7, YZF-R1 (currently)

Withdrawn motorcycles

- MV Agusta: MV Agusta F4
- Norton: Norton rotary F1
- KTM: KTM 1190 RC8

== Race weekend ==
2 Race Weekend	3 Race Weekend
Friday: Practice 1 (50 Mins); Practice 2 (50 Mins)	Friday: Practice 1 (50 Mins); Practice 2 (50 Mins)
Saturday: Practice 3 (50 Mins); Qualifying (3 Sessions); Session 1: All riders; Session 2: Riders Between 20-10 Knocked Out; Session 3: Top 10 Shootout	Saturday: Qualifying (3 Sessions); Session 1: All riders; Session 2: Riders Between 20-10 Knocked Out; Session 3: Top 10 Shootout; Race 1
Sunday: Warm Up (20 Mins); Race 1; Race 2	Sunday: Warm Up (10 Mins); Race 2 (Sprint Race); Race 3

- For 2010 a change to the qualifying system means that riders will only "qualify" for race one, (or race one and two if it is a 3 race weekend). The grid for the other race will be decided by the fastest lap in the previous race.

== Support classes ==
Currently, the BSB is supported by four main support series. These being:

- The British Supersport Championship: acting as a lower division of the main BSB
- The National Superstock 1000 Championship
- The National Superstock 600 Championship
- The British Motostar Championship

== TV coverage ==
The move to ITV vastly increased the viewing figures by a reported 450% over the figures for 2005.

During the 2006 season ITV1's BSB coverage attracted an average UK adult audience of 962,000 per round with a peak audience of more than 1.5 million for the cliff-hanger final leg at Brands Hatch

Races were covered live by ITV and Sky Sports.

Over the twelve BSB rounds, the 'live' ITV1 coverage attracted an average adult audience of some 11,552,000, which equates to an average viewership of 962,000 per round and 10.68% audience share with 317,100 attending the twelve rounds, with 270,000 viewers on "delayed" Sky Sports transmission

For the 2008 championship, the series was now live on British Eurosport, with highlights on Channel 4 within the next few days. This was a step down from where the BSB had previously been having an effect on the viewing figures

The total UK BSB TV audience in 2008 was 7 million compared to 11 million in 2007 – which averages at 600,000 per round which was basically split 50:50 between Eurosport and Channel 4

== Scoring system (2023 onwards) ==
Points per race for the top 15 riders
	1st	2nd	3rd	4th	5th	6th	7th	8th	9th	10th	11th	12th	13th	14th	15th
Main season (rounds 1–8)	18	16	14	12	11	10	9	8	7	6	5	4	3	2	1
Showdown (round 9, 10)	25	22	20	18	16	14	12	10	8	6	5	4	3	2	1
Season finale (round 11)	35	30	27	24	22	20	18	16	14	12	10	8	6	4	2

== British Superbike Champions ==
=== Timeline ===
Season	Series	Rider	Bike	Team	Notes
1988	750 cc / TT F1	(England) Darren Dixon	(Japan) Suzuki RG500 (1)	Padgett's Racing	Dixon went on to pilot sidecars alongside passenger Andy Hetherington
1989	750cc / TT F1	(England) Steve Spray	(United Kingdom) Norton RCW588	JPS Norton Racing	
1989	Superbike	(Scotland) Brian Morrison	(Japan) Honda VFR750R RC30 (1)	Honda UK Murray Intl	
1990	750cc / TT F1	(England) Terry Rymer	(Japan) Yamaha FZR750R OW01 (1)	Team Loctite	Terry now runs Diablo 666 Endurance racing Team
1990	Superbike	(England) Trevor Nation	(United Kingdom) Norton RCW588	JPS Norton Racing	
1991	750 cc / TT F1	(England) Rob McElnea	(Japan) Yamaha FZR750R OW01 (2)	Team Loctite	
1991	Superbike	(England) James Whitham	(Japan) Suzuki GSX-R	Castrol Suzuki Team Grant	
1992	750 cc / TT F1	(England) John Reynolds	(Japan) Kawasaki ZXR750 (1)	Team Green	
1992	Superbike	(England) John Reynolds	(Japan) Kawasaki ZXR750 (1)	Team Green	
1993	Superbike	(England) James Whitham	(Japan) Yamaha YZF750 (3)	Fast Orange	
1994	Superbike	(Scotland) Ian Simpson	(United Kingdom) Norton Rotary F1 (1)	Team Crighton	
1995	Superbike	(Scotland) Steve Hislop	(Italy) Ducati 916/955 (1)	Devimead	Whitham was suffering from/treated for Hodgkin's Disease, a form of cancer
1996	Superbike	(Scotland) Niall Mackenzie	(Japan) Yamaha YZF750 (4)	Cadbury's Boost	
1997	Superbike	(Scotland) Niall Mackenzie	(Japan) Yamaha YZF750 (5)	Cadbury's Boost	
1998	Superbike	(Scotland) Niall Mackenzie (3)	(Japan) Yamaha YZF750 (6)	Cadbury's Boost	387 points, 6 wins and 1 pole from 24 races
1999	Superbike	(Australia) Troy Bayliss	(Italy) Ducati 996 (2)	INS GSE	394 points, 7 wins and 6 poles from 24 races
2000	Superbike	(England) Neil Hodgson	(Italy) Ducati 996 (3)	INS GSE	422 points, 7 wins and 5 poles from 24 races Privateer Cup Champion: Dave Heal (Kawasaki ZX-7R) (Myco Motorsports)
2001	Superbike	(England) John Reynolds	(Italy) Ducati 996 RS (4)	Revé Red Bull	536 points
2002	Superbike	(Scotland) Steve Hislop (2)	(Italy) Ducati 998 RS (5)	Monstermob Ducati	452 points, 8 wins, 5 poles and 17 podiums from 26 races (1 DNF)
2003	Superbike	(England) Shane Byrne	(Italy) Ducati 998 F02 (6)	Monstermob Ducati	488 points, 12 wins, 5 poles and 21 podiums from 24 races (1 DNF)
2004	Superbike	(England) John Reynolds (3)	(Japan) Suzuki GSX-R1000 (2)	Crescent Q8 Rizla	446 points, from 26 races
2005	Superbike	(Spain) Gregorio Lavilla	(Italy) Ducati 999 F04 (7)	Airwaves GSE	Reynolds injured in pre-season testing. 461 points from 26 races
2006	Superbike	(Japan) Ryuichi Kiyonari	(Japan) Honda CBR1000RR (2)	HM Plant HRC	466 points, 11 wins from 26 races
2007	Superbike	(Japan) Ryuichi Kiyonari	(Japan) Honda CBR1000RR (3)	HM Plant HRC	433 points, 8 wins from 26 races
2008	Superbike	(England) Shane Byrne (2)	(Italy) Ducati 1098 (8)	Airwaves GSE	474 points, 10 wins from 24 races, 5 poles, 3 doubles (1 DNF)
2009	Superbike	(England) Leon Camier	(Japan) Yamaha YZF-R1 (7)	Airwaves GSE	549.5 points, 19 wins from 26 races, 9 poles, 4 doubles & 1 treble (1 DSQ)
2010	Superbike	(Japan) Ryuichi Kiyonari (3)	(Japan) Honda CBR1000RR (4)	HM Plant HRC	First season of NASCAR Chase-style points system.
2011	Superbike	(England) Tommy Hill	(Japan) Yamaha YZF-R1 (8)	Swan Yamaha	Championship down to last corner of the last race - won by 2 points overall and 0.006 seconds.
2012	Superbike	(England) Shane Byrne (3)	(Japan) Kawasaki ZX-10R (2)	Rapid Solicitors Kawasaki	Championship down to the last race at Brands Hatch.
2013	Superbike	(England) Alex Lowes	(Japan) Honda CBR1000RR (5)	Samsung Honda UK	Championship down to the last race at Brands Hatch. Three wet races.
2014	Superbike	(England) Shane Byrne (4)	(Japan) Kawasaki ZX-10R (3)	Rapid Solicitors Kawasaki	Took the title after challenger Kiyonari broke his collar bone during practice at the final round.
2015	Superbike	(Australia) Josh Brookes	(Japan) Yamaha YZF-R1 (9)	Milwaukee Yamaha	703 points, 13 wins, 23 podiums & 6 doubles.
2016	Superbike	(England) Shane Byrne (5)	(Italy) Ducati 1199 Panigale (9)	Be Wiser Ducati	Championship down to the last race at Brands Hatch.
2017	Superbike	(England) Shane Byrne (6)	(Italy) Ducati 1199 Panigale (10)	Be Wiser Ducati	Championship down to the last race at Brands Hatch between Shane Byrne, Leon Haslam and Josh Brookes.
2018	Superbike	(England) Leon Haslam	(Japan) Kawasaki ZX-10R (4)	JG Speedfit Kawasaki	699 points, 15 wins, 4 doubles, 1 treble and finished every race.
2019	Superbike	(England) Scott Redding	(Italy) Ducati Panigale V4 (1)	Be Wiser Ducati	Debut season for Redding after moving to BSB from MotoGP
2020	Superbike	(Australia) Josh Brookes (2)	(Italy) Ducati Panigale V4 (2)	VisionTrack Ducati	Season run behind closed doors (global pandemic) and shorter calendar. First non-Playoff format since 2009.
2021	Superbike	(Scotland) Tarran Mackenzie	(Japan) Yamaha YZF-R1 (10)	McAMS Yamaha	Playoff format returned and extended to top eight riders.
2022	Superbike	(England) Bradley Ray	(Japan) Yamaha YZF-R1 (11)	Rich Energy OMG Yamaha	Playoff format for top eight riders.
2023	Superbike	(England) Tommy Bridewell	(Italy) Ducati Panigale V4 (3)	BeerMonster Ducati	Championship went to the final round at Brands Hatch. Tommy Bridewell won from Glen Irwin by 0.5 points, with Kyle Ryde third in the championship.
2024	Superbike	(England) Kyle Ryde	(Japan) Yamaha YZF-R1 (12)	OMG Racing Yamaha	Championship went to the final round at Brands Hatch. Kyle Ryde won from Tommy Bridewell by 1 point after a last lap battle. Glenn Irwin third in the championship.
2025	Superbike	(England) Kyle Ryde (2)	(Japan) Yamaha YZF-R1 (13)	Nitrous Competitions Racing Yamaha	Championship went to the final round at Brands Hatch. Kyle Ryde won from Bradley Ray by 20 points, with Leon Haslam in third in the championship.
2026	Superbike	(England) Kyle Ryde (3)	(Italy) Ducati Panigale V4 (4)	Nitrous Coin Nitrous Competitions Racing Ducati	Championship went to the final round at Brands Hatch.

=== By Nationality ===
Championships	Nation	Riders
29	England	Shane Byrne (6), John Reynolds (3), Kyle Ryde (3), Darren Dixon, Steve Spray, Terry Rymer, Trevor Nation, Rob McElnea, James Whitham, Neil Hodgson, Leon Camier, Tommy Hill, Alex Lowes, Leon Haslam, Scott Redding, Bradley Ray, Tommy Bridewell
8	Scotland	Niall Mackenzie (3), Steve Hislop (2), Brian Morrison, Ian Simpson, Tarran Mackenzie
3	Japan	Ryuichi Kiyonari (3)
3	Australia	Josh Brookes (2), Troy Bayliss
1	Spain	Gregorio Lavilla
