= Cadwell Park =

Motor racing circuit in Lincolnshire, England

- Motorcycle Full Circuit (2004–present)
- Location: Lincolnshire, England
- Coordinates: 53°18′32″N 0°3′47″W
- Owner: MotorSport Vision (January 2004–present)
- Opened: 1938
- Major events: Current: BSB (1995–2019, 2021–present); Former: British F3 (1954–1955, 1962, 1965, 1970–1972, 1974–1975, 1977–1983)
- Website: https://www.cadwellpark.co.uk/

Full Circuit (1961–present)
- Length: 3.502 km (2.176 mi)
- Turns: 18
- Race lap record: 1:21.036 ( (United Kingdom) Sam Moss, Anderson CSK, 2021, Superkart)

Motorcycle Full Circuit (2004–present)
- Length: 3.508 km (2.180 mi)
- Turns: 19
- Race lap record: 1:25.472 ( (United Kingdom) Bradley Ray, Yamaha YZF-R1, 2025, SBK)

Club Circuit (1961–present)
- Length: 2.375 km (1.476 mi)
- Turns: 10
- Race lap record: 0:55.400 ( (United Kingdom) Tony Lanfranchi, Elva Mk VII, 1963, Sports car)

Woodlands Circuit (1961–present)
- Length: 1.365 km (0.848 mi)
- Turns: 9

Full Circuit (1952–1960)
- Length: 2.012 km (1.250 mi)
- Turns: 13

Original Circuit (1938–1950)
- Length: 1.207 km (0.750 mi)
- Turns: 7

Cadwell Park is a motor racing circuit in Lincolnshire, England, 5 mi (8.0 km) south of Louth, owned and operated by MotorSport Vision, a business associated with former racing driver Jonathan Palmer. Sited on former parkland across a steep-sided valley with dips and crests, the circuit features sharp changes in gradient, including one section called The Mountain where bikes can become airborne by up to several feet. Its mix of challenging corners has led to its nickname as the Mini-Nürburgring.

== History ==
Cadwell Park shown within Lincolnshire
(grid reference TF293810)

Located in the Lincolnshire Wolds, Cadwell Park was established in 1934 (92 years ago) by Mr Mansfield Wilkinson of Louth. His sons originally used the land for racing their own motorbikes against each other.

Originally the gravel-drives of the country estate measured 0.75 mi (1.21 km), with tarmac and concrete being added in 1938, with widening and lengthening in 1953, and lengthened again in 1961 with the addition of the Donington Curve.

In 1953 the track was lengthened to 1.250 mi (2.012 km), upon the invitation of the 500 cc motorcycle-engined Formula 3 to race in a traditional bike meeting. Around 30,000 spectators attended that particular race.

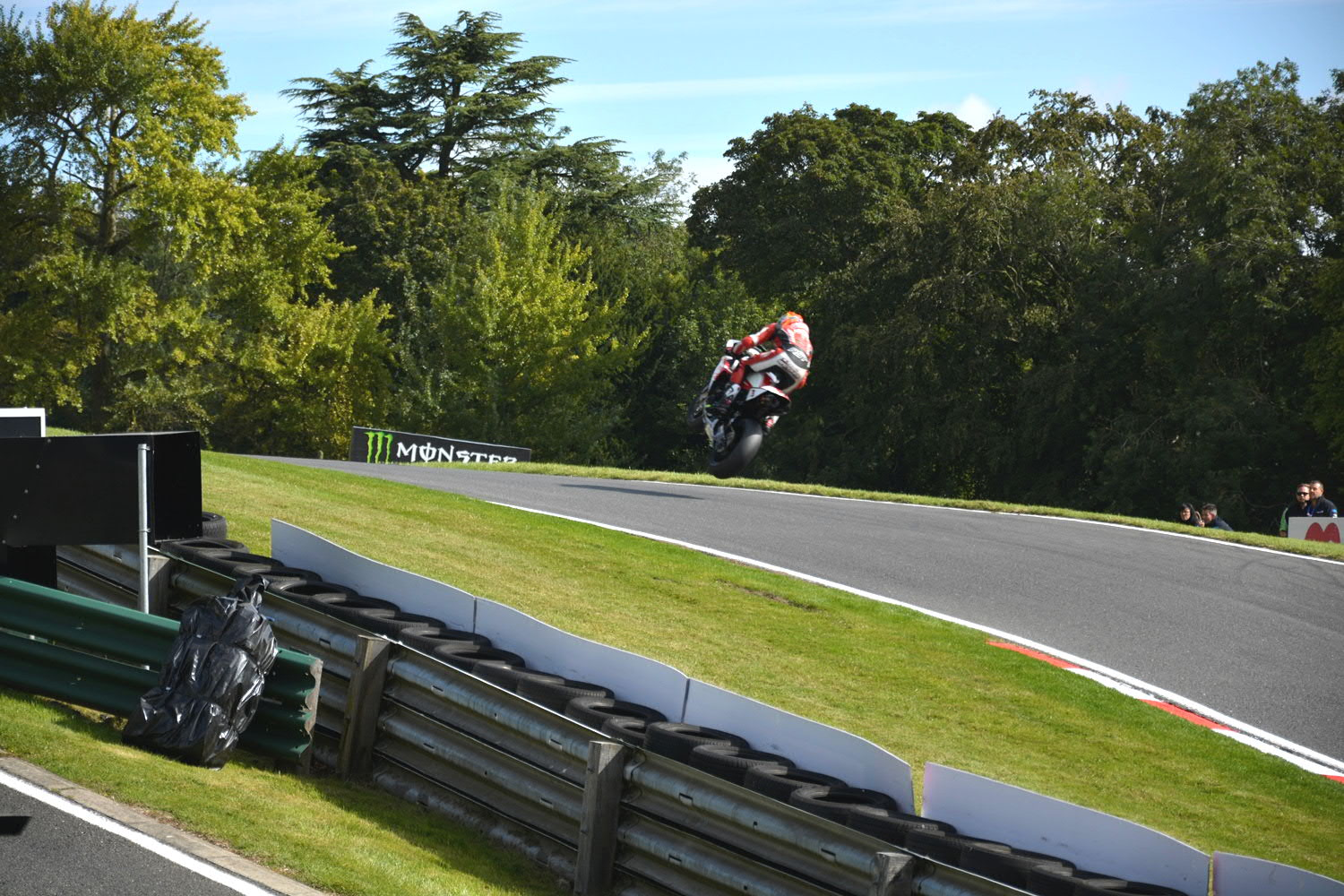
Josh Brookes aviating on a Milwaukee Yamaha British Superbike at The Mountain in 2014

The track grew to the current 2.175 mi (3.500 km) layout in 1962 and hosted the British F3 series the next May. Some of the bends are named after family members e.g. Mansfield, Charlie and Chris.

Cadwell Park circuit was acquired by MotorSport Vision (MSV) along with Brands Hatch, Oulton Park, and Snetterton from The Interpublic Group of Companies subsidiary Octagon in January 2004. Octagon previously acquired prior owner Brands Hatch Leisure plc in November 1999. MSV immediately implemented a programme of improvements to the venue, designed to heighten customer experiences both for spectators and competitors.

== Racing usage ==
Competitively, Cadwell Park is primarily used for motorcycle racing, with the British Superbike Championship round being the biggest event on the circuit's calendar, held during an August weekend each year. In 2010, it hosted an additional BSB meeting on the weekend of 22/23 May.

Cadwell Park occasionally features in the British Superkart Championship calendar, having last done so in 2021. A new circuit lap record for any vehicle was set by driver Sam Moss in that year.

The circuit's track width is now generally considered too narrow for high level car races, although Club motorsport associations such as the BARC, HSCC and 750MC still hold meetings.

== Current events ==
In addition to the August round of the British Superbike Championship, Cadwell Park also hosts two major historic events with the Vintage Sports Car Club's annual festival and the Wolds Trophy covering the post-war period.

The Vintage Motorcycle Club is a regular visitor, with the popular Modified Live car show event also on the calendar. The Cadwell Park season typically ends with stage rallying and fireworks.

During the week the circuit offers general test days and track days for cars and motorcycles, and can also be hired out for private use.

== Other usage ==
Several tests and feature clips for the motoring program Fifth Gear have been filmed here. They frequently feature racing driver Tiff Needell.

In April 2009, musician and Pink Floyd drummer Nick Mason flew into the circuit by helicopter to drive his £1.5 million Ferrari 512.

In June 2015 the circuit was used as part of the course for pedal-cycling's British National Time Trial Championships.

Some racing scenes for the 2013 film Rush were filmed at Cadwell Park.

Top Gear used the circuit for a feature, aired in 2020, featuring former Formula One driver Damon Hill pitted against the regular Top Gear presenters, testing a Porsche, Aston Martin and Ferrari.

== Stock Car racing ==
During the 1960s and 1970s, BriSCA Formula 1 Stock Cars attracted big crowds to Cadwell. The gradient changes added excitement to the racing, as stock car drivers were accustomed to racing on flat 400-yard (370 m) oval tracks of shale or tarmac; and likewise their cars' suspensions and gearing were set up for short flat ovals.

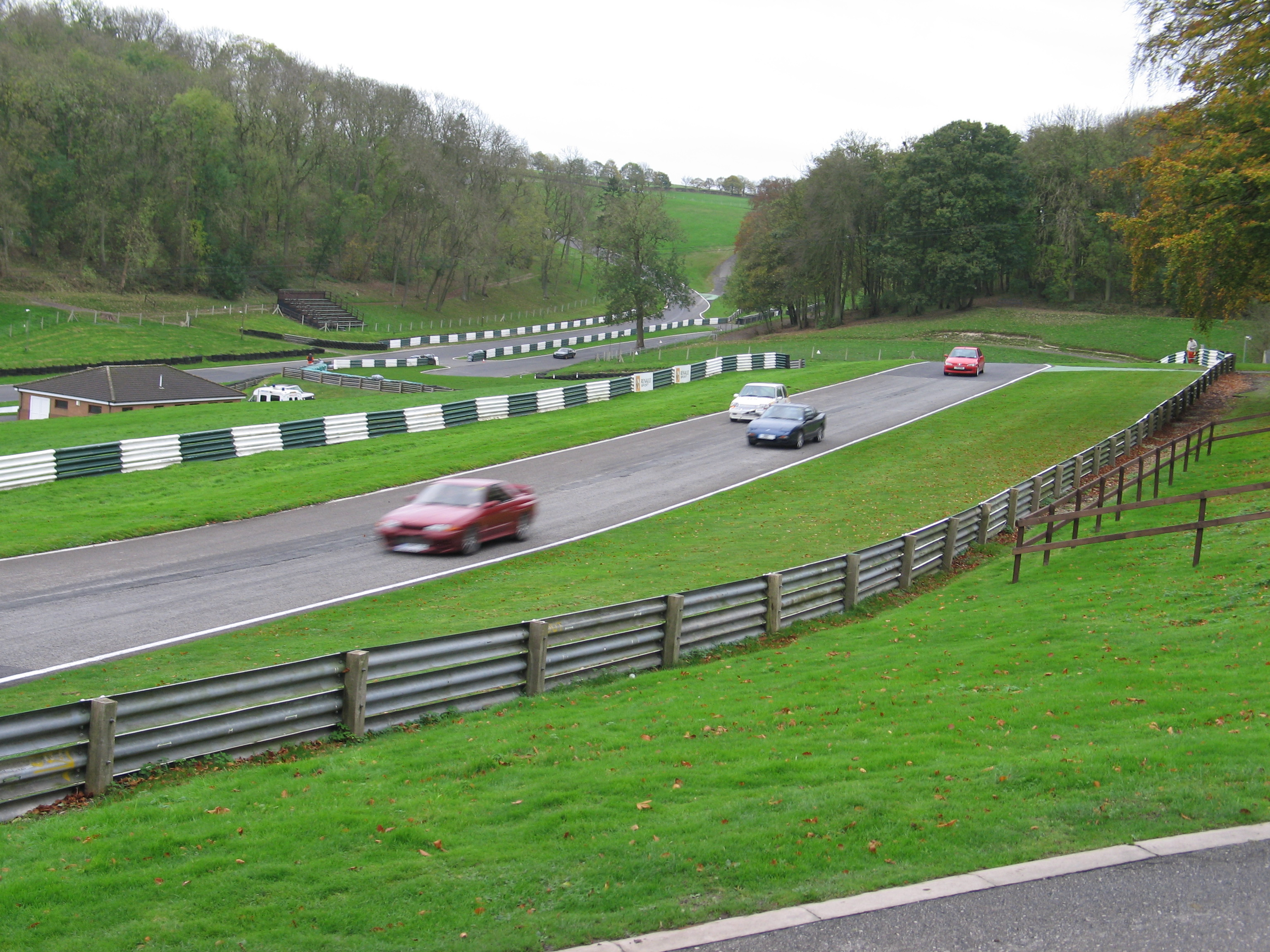
View from Hall Bends, looking towards Coppice

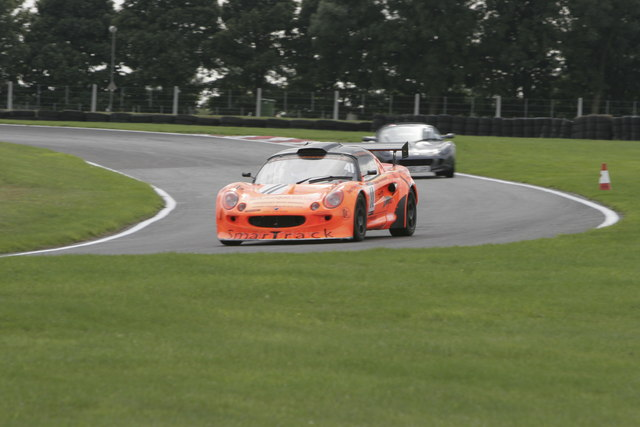
Chris Curve

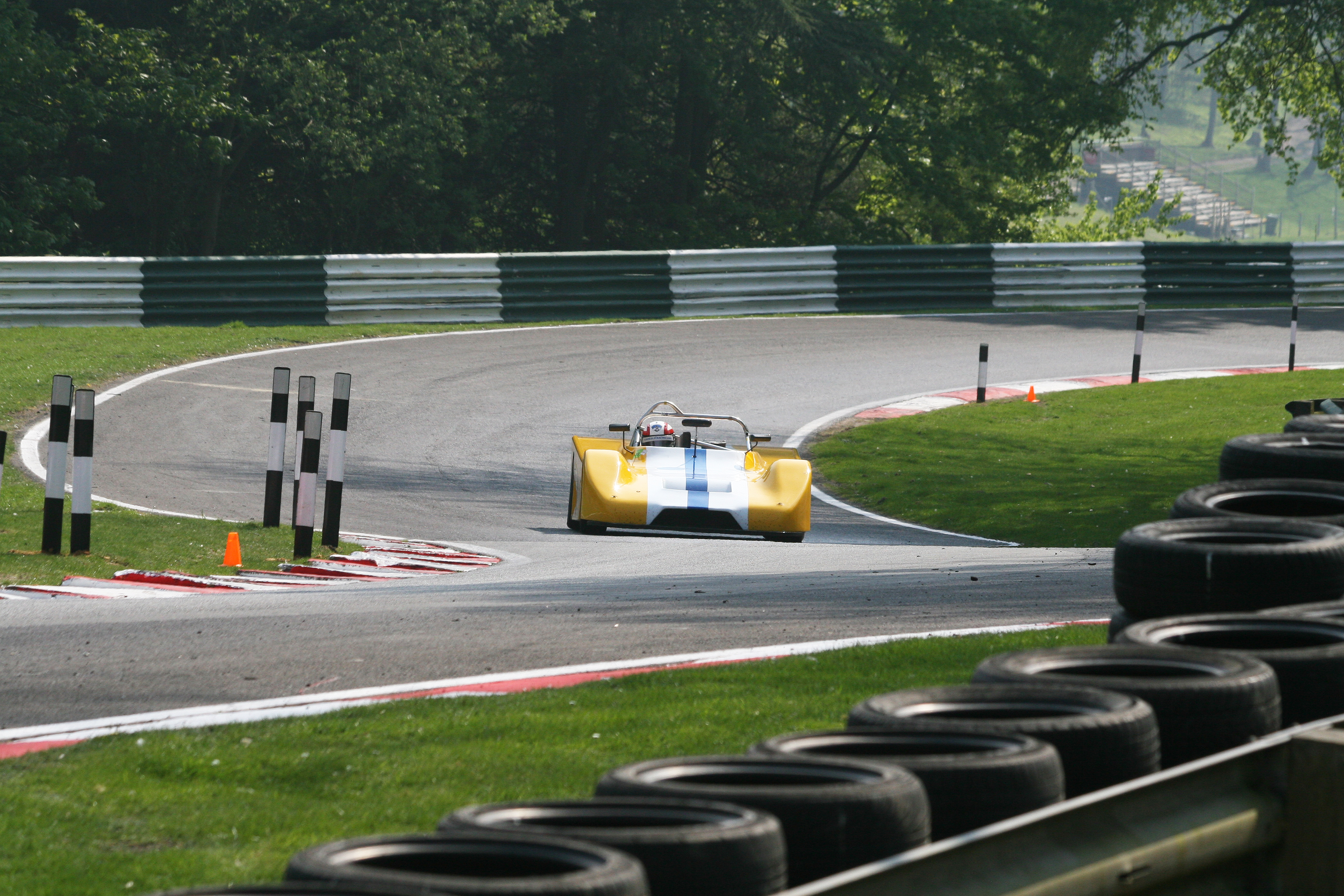
Hall Bends

== Race lap records ==
As of August 2026, the fastest official race lap records at Cadwell Park are listed as:

Category	Time	Driver	Vehicle	Event
Full Circuit (1961–present): 2.176 mi (3.502 km)
Superkart	1:21.036	Sam Moss	Anderson CSK	2021 Cadwell Park British Superkart round
Formula 1000	1:21.130	Richard Mitcham	F1000	2010 Cadwell Park F1000 round
Formula Three	1:23.490	Enrique Mansilla	Ralt RT3	1982 Cadwell Park British F3 round
Sports prototype	1:39.000	Tony Dean	Ferrari Dino 206 S	1968 Cadwell Park Special GT 2.0 round
Formula Libre	1:44.000	Brian Hart	Lotus 22	1962 Cadwell Park Formula Libre race
Motorcycle Full Circuit (2004–present): 2.180 mi (3.508 km)
Superbike	1:25.472	Bradley Ray	Yamaha YZF-R1	2025 Cadwell Park BSB round
Supersport	1:28.267	Jack Kennedy	Honda CBR600RR	2025 Cadwell Park BSS round
Sportbike	1:31.715	Harrison Dessoy	Triumph Daytona 660	2025 Cadwell Park British Sportbike round
BMW F900R Cup	1:33.662	Bobby Varey	BMW F900R	2026 Cadwell Park BMW F900R Cup round
Club Circuit (1961–present): 1.476 mi (2.375 km)
Sports car racing	0:55.400	Tony Lanfranchi	Elva Mk VII	1963 Cadwell Park sports car race

== Track records ==
Lap Records
Driver	Car	Time
Sam Moss	Division One Superkart	1:21.036
Richard Mitcham	Jedi MK6	1:21.138
Thomas Gadd	Jedi MK6/7 (750MC)	1:21.899
Jeremy Timms	Dallara F301-Suzuki (Monoposto Mono1400)	1:21.979
Shaun Balfe	Radical SR8	1:22.50
Tim Gray	Spire GT3 (750MC Bikesports)	1:22.82
Jimmy Broadbent	Praga R1	1.23.562
Enrique Mansilla	Monoposto F3	1:23.572
Robin Liddell	Radical Prosport	1:25.49
Lee Atkins	Radical SR4	1:29.04
Russ Stephens	Radical Clubsport	1:29.36
