= 24 Hours of Spa (motorcycle race) =

Motorcycle endurance race in Belgium

FIM Endurance World Championship
- Venue: Circuit de Spa-Francorchamps
- Location: 50°26′14″N 5°58′17″E
- First race: 1971
- Duration: 8 hours
- Previous names: 24 Heures de Liège, 8 Heures de Spa (2024–present)
- Most wins (driver): (France) Christian Lavieille (4) (France) Jacques Luc (4)
- Most wins (manufacturer): (Japan) Honda (12)

The 24 Heures de Spa-Francorchamps Motos (previously called 24 Heures de Liège moto) is a motorcycle endurance race held annually since 1971 on the Circuit de Spa-Francorchamps, Francorchamps, Stavelot, Wallonia, Belgium and is part of the Endurance FIM World Championship. From 2024, the race has been run in 8 hours format.

== History ==
The inaugural event took place on August 28 and 29, 1971 on the Zolder circuit. The competition took place on two different circuits:

- from 1971 to 1972: Circuit Zolder;
- from 1973 to 2003 and after 2022: Circuit de Spa-Francorchamps.

When the Bol d'Or moved from Bugatti Circuit to Circuit Paul Ricard at the end of 1977, the ACO created the 24 Heures Moto. The race became one of "the classics" of endurance racing along with the 24 Hours of Liège, the 8 Hours Of Suzuka, and the Bol d'Or.

At the end of 2001, the three 24 Hour classic races (Le Mans, Liège and the Bol d'Or) withdrew from the Endurance World Championship to create the Master of Endurance (an Endurance competition consisting on the 3 races that was held between 2002 and 2005). Le Mans and Bol d'Or returned to the Endurance FIM World Championship in 2006, but 24 Hours of Liége didn't while the track had lost FIM homolgation.

After twenty years of interruption, the race returned renamed as 24 Hours of Spa-Francorchamps and as part of the FIM Endurance World Championship calendar with a ten-year contract.

Circuit Zolder circuit until 1972

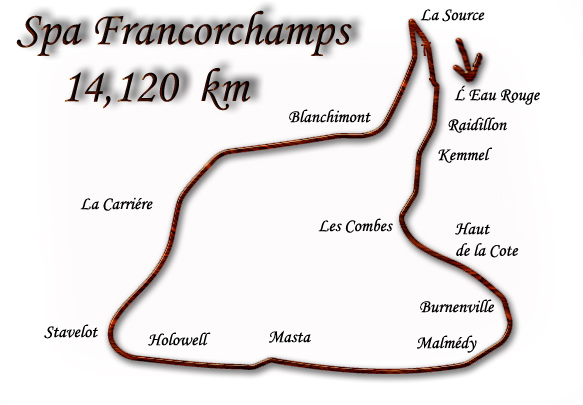
Circuit de Spa-Francorchamps in the version used until 1978

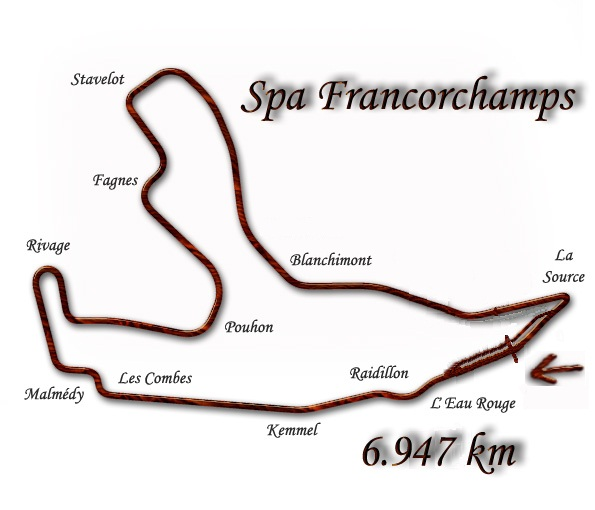
Circuit de Spa-Francorchamps after 1979

== Winners ==
24 Hours of Spa winners
Year	Riders			Bike
Year	Rider 1	Rider 2	Rider 3	Bike
1971	(United Kingdom) Clive Brown	(United Kingdom) Nigel Rollason		BSA
1972	(France) Georges Godier	(Switzerland) Alain Genoud		Honda
1973	(United Kingdom) John Williams	(United Kingdom) Charlie Williams		Honda
1974	(France) Jean-Claude Chemarin	(France) Gérard Debrock		Honda
1975	(France) Roger Ruiz	(France) Christian Huguet		Japauto
1976	(France) Jean-Claude Chemarin	(France) Christian Léon		Honda
1977	(France) Jacques Luc	(France) Pierre Soulas		Honda
1978	(France) Jacques Luc	(Belgium) Jack Buytaert		Honda
1979	(France) Jacques Luc	(Belgium) Jack Buytaert		Honda
1980	(France) Marc Fontan	(France) Hervé Moineau		Honda
1981	(France) Jacques Luc	(France) Pierre-Étienne Samin		Suzuki
1982	(France) Jean-Claude Chemarin	(Switzerland) Jacques Cornu	(Switzerland) Sergio Pelandini	Kawasaki
1983	(Switzerland) Jacques Cornu	(France) Thierry Espié	(Belgium) Didier de Radiguès	Kawasaki
1984	(France) Gérard Coudray	(France) Patrick Igoa	(France) Alex Vieira	Honda
1985	(France) Hervé Moineau	(Belgium) Richard Hubin	(France) Jean-Pierre Oudin	Suzuki
1986	(France) Gérard Coudray	(France) Patrick Igoa	(France) Alex Vieira	Honda
1987	(Belgium) Richard Hubin	(Belgium) Michel Siméon	(Belgium) Michel Simul	Suzuki
1988	(France) Hervé Moineau	(France) Bruno Le Bihan	(France) Thierry Crine	Suzuki
1989	(France) Alex Vieira	(Belgium) Stéphane Mertens	(United Kingdom) Roger Burnett	Suzuki
1990	Race cancelled			
1991	(Belgium) Stéphane Mertens	(France) Dominique Sarron	(France) Christian Lavieille	Suzuki
1992	(United Kingdom) Terry Rymer	(United Kingdom) Carl Fogarty	(France) Jehan d'Orgeix	Kawasaki
1993	(United Kingdom) Steve Manley	(United Kingdom) Simon Buckmaster	(United States) Doug Toland	Kawasaki
1994	(France) Adrien Morillas	(France) Jean-Louis Battistini	(France) Denis Bonoris	Kawasaki
1995	(France) Jean-Michel Mattioli	(Belgium) Stéphane Mertens	(Belgium) Michel Siméon	Honda
1996	(Italy) Piergiorgio Bontempi	(France) Stéphane Coutelle	(United Kingdom) Brian Morrison	Kawasaki
1997	(France) Juan-Eric Gomez	(United States) Doug Polen	(Australia) Peter Goddard	Suzuki
1998	(France) Christian Lavieille	(United States) Doug Polen	(France) William Costes	Honda
1999	(Portugal) Telmo Pereira	(France) Michel Graziano	(France) Bruno Bonhuil	Suzuki
2000	(France) Jean-Marc Delétang	(France) Fabien Foret	(Australia) Mark Willis	Yamaha
2001	(France) Christian Lavieille	(United Kingdom) Brian Morrison	(France) Laurent Brian	Suzuki
2002	(France) Christian Lavieille	(United Kingdom) Brian Morrison	(France) Laurent Brian	Suzuki
2003	(France) Olivier Four	(France) Sébastien Gimbert	(France) Nicolas Dussauge	Suzuki
race not held
2022	(Germany) Markus Reiterberger	(Ukraine) Illia Mykhalchyk	(France) Jeremy Guarnoni	BMW
2023	(Italy) Niccolò Canepa	(Germany) Marvin Fritz	(Czech Republic) Karel Hanika	Yamaha
2024	(Italy) Niccolò Canepa	(Germany) Marvin Fritz	(Czech Republic) Karel Hanika	Yamaha
2025	(France) Alan Techer	(France) Corentin Perolari		Honda
2026	(Netherlands) Michael van der Mark	(Germany) Markus Reiterberger	(South Africa) Steven Odendaal	BMW

=== By manufacturer ===
Wins	Manufacturer	Year
13	(Japan) Honda	1972, 1973, 1974, 1976, 1977, 1978, 1979, 1980, 1984, 1986, 1995, 1998, 2025
11	(Japan) Suzuki	1981, 1985, 1987, 1988, 1989, 1991, 1997, 1999, 2001, 2002, 2003
6	(Japan) Kawasaki	1982, 1983, 1992, 1993, 1994, 1996
3	(Japan) Yamaha	2000, 2023, 2024
2	(Germany) BMW	2022, 2026
2	(France) Japauto	1975
2	(United Kingdom) BSA	1971

== See also ==
- FIM Endurance World Championship
