= SERT =

SERT can refer to:

== Teams ==
- Special Emergency Reaction Team, part of the Portland Police Bureau
- Seabee Engineer Reconnaissance Team, an organizational unit in the United States Navy
- Special Emergency Response Team, a former tactical unit of the Royal Canadian Mounted Police
- Special Emergency Response Team (Queensland), the tactical unit of the Queensland Police Service in Australia
- Special Emergency Response Team, a unit of the Pennsylvania State Police
- Suzuki Endurance Racing Team, most successful FIM Endurance World Championship team
- Special Security Readiness Team of the Japanese Ministry of Justice

== Other uses ==
- Serotonin transporter, a protein that transports serotonin from the synaptic cleft back to the presynaptic neuron
- Space Electric Rocket Test or SERT-1, a probe used by NASA to test ion thruster design
- Server Efficiency Rating Tool, a computer performance analysis tool

== See also ==
- Sert (disambiguation)
