= Cert =

Cert or CERT may refer to:

== Emergency response ==
- Community emergency response team, teams of volunteer emergency responders across the United States
- Computer emergency response team, an expert group that handles computer security incidents
  - CERT Coordination Center (CERT/CC), the worldwide center for coordinating information about Internet security at Carnegie Mellon University, the first and most well-known CERT
    - CERT Coding Standards, developed by the CERT Coordination Center at Carnegie Mellon University
  - United States Computer Emergency Readiness Team (US-CERT)
- Correctional emergency response team, a team of correction officers

== Legal ==
- Certiorari, a Latin legal term for a court order requiring judicial review of a case
  - Certiorari before judgment, a specific form of a writ of certiorari
  - Cert pool, shorthand term for the pool of applicants for a writ of certiorari from the United States Supreme Court

== Organizations ==
- CERT Group of Companies, a private education provider in the Middle East
- Council of Education, Recruitment and Training, a hospitality training authority overseen by the National Tourism Development Authority of Ireland Fáilte Ireland, active 1963–2003
- Council of Energy Resource Tribes, a consortium of Native America tribes established to increase tribal control over natural resources

== Other uses ==
- Carbon Emission Reduction Target, a United Kingdom government initiative
- Constant extension rate tensile testing, a standard method of testing of materials also known as slow strain rate testing

== See also ==
- Ceirt, a letter of the Ogham alphabet
- Certificate (disambiguation)
- Certs, a brand of breath mints
- Sert (disambiguation)
