= 24 Hours of Le Mans (motorcycle race) =

Motorcycle endurance race in France

24 Heures Motos
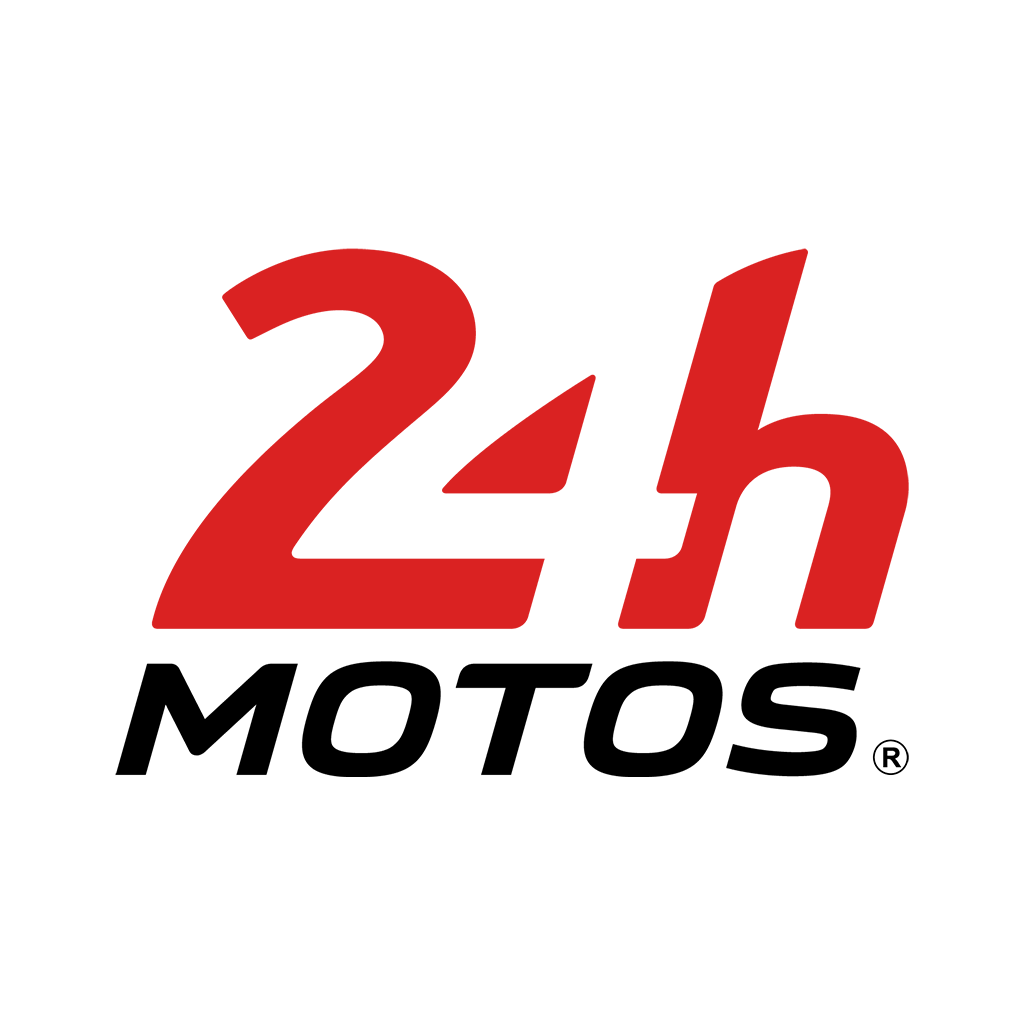

FIM Endurance World Championship
- Venue: Circuit Bugatti
- Location: 47°56′30″N 0°13′30″E
- First race: 1978
- Last race: 2025
- Duration: 24 hours
- Most wins (driver): (France) Alex Vieira (5) (France) Grégory Leblanc (5)
- Most wins (manufacturer): (Japan) Suzuki (15)

The 24 Heures Motos (often called in English the 24 Hours of Le Mans motorcycle race) is a motorcycle endurance race held annually since 1978 on the Bugatti Circuit, Le Mans, Sarthe, France. The race is organized by the Automobile Club de l'Ouest (ACO) and is part of the Endurance FIM World Championship.

== History ==
When the Bol d'Or moved from Bugatti Circuit to Circuit Paul Ricard at the end of 1977, the ACO created the 24 Heures Moto. The race became one of "the classics" of endurance racing along with the 24 Hours of Liège, the 8 Hours Of Suzuka, and the Bol d'Or.

At the end of 2001, the three 24 Hour classic races (Le Mans, Liège and the Bol d'Or) withdrew from the Endurance World Championship to create the Master of Endurance. Le Mans returned to the Endurance FIM World Championship in 2006.

== Race weekend format ==
Thursday

Free practice sessions, 1st qualifying practice sessions (in groups) and night practice sessions

Friday

2nd qualifying practice sessions (in groups), superpole

Saturday

Warm-up session. 3.00 pm Le Mans start. NOTE: The traditional Le Mans start, abolished in 1970 for automobiles, is still used for motorcycles.

Sunday

3.00 pm, finish of the race followed by the prize-giving ceremony

== Winners ==
Year	Riders			Bike	Team
Year	Rider 1	Rider 2	Rider 3	Bike	Team
1978	(France) Jean-Claude Chemarin	(France) Christian Léon		Honda RCB 1000	
1979	(France) Jean-Claude Chemarin	(France) Christian Léon		Honda RCB 1000	
1980	(France) Marc Fontan	(France) Hervé Moineau		Honda RCB 1000	
1981	(France) Jean-Claude Chemarin	(France) Christian Huguet		Kawasaki Z 1000 J	
1982	(France) Pierre-Étienne Samin	(France) Dominique Pernet		Suzuki GS 1000 R	
1983	(France) Gérard Coudray	(Switzerland) Jacques Cornu	(Switzerland) Sergio Pellandini	Kawasaki Z 1000 R	
1984	(Netherlands) Dirk Brand	(Netherlands) Henk Van der Mark		Suzuki GS 1000 R	
1985	(France) Bernard Millet	(France) Guy Bertin	(France) Philippe Guichon	Suzuki GSX-R 750	
1986	(France) Alex Vieira	(France) Gérard Coudray	(France) Patrick Igoa	Honda VFR 750 R RC30	
1987	(France) Alex Vieira	(France) Jean-Michel Mattioli	(France) Jean-Louis Battistini	Honda VFR 750 R RC30	
1988	(France) Alex Vieira	(France) Jean-Michel Mattioli	(France) Christophe Bouheben	Honda VFR 750 R RC30	
1989	(France) Alex Vieira	(France) Jean-Michel Mattioli	(United Kingdom) Roger Burnett	Honda VFR 750 R RC30	
1990	(France) Alex Vieira	(France) Jean-Michel Mattioli	(Belgium) Stéphane Mertens	Honda VFR 750 R RC30	
1991	(France) Philippe Monneret	(France) Bruno Bonhuil	(France) Rachel Nicotte	Yamaha YZF 750 R (FZR 750 R OW01)	
1992	(United Kingdom) Terry Rymer	(United Kingdom) Carl Fogarty	(Belgium) Michel Simul	Kawasaki ZXR 750 R	Kawasaki France
1993	(France) Adrien Morillas	(United Kingdom) Brian Morrison	(France) Wilfried Veille	Kawasaki ZXR 750 R	Kawasaki France
1994	(France) Adrien Morillas	(France) Jean-Louis Battistini	(United Kingdom) Terry Rymer	Kawasaki ZXR 750 R	Kawasaki France
1995	(France) Alex Vieira	(France) Rachel Nicotte	(United Kingdom) Brian Morrison	Honda RVF 750 R RC45	Honda France
1996	(France) Jehan D'Orgeix	(Italy) Piergiorgio Bontempi	(United Kingdom) Brian Morrison	Kawasaki ZX-7R	Kawasaki France
1997	(United States) Doug Polen	(France) Juan-Éric Gomez	(Australia) Peter Goddard	Suzuki GSX-R 750	SERT
1998	(France) Bertrand Sebileau	(France) Thierry Paillot	(Slovenia) Igor Jerman	Kawasaki ZX-7RR	Kawasaki France
1999	(France) Bertrand Sebileau	(United Kingdom) Steve Hislop	(United Kingdom) Chris Walker	Kawasaki ZX-7RR	Kawasaki France
2000	(France) Sébastien Charpentier	(France) William Costes	(France) Sébastien Gimbert	Honda VTR RC51	Honda France
2001	(France) Christophe Guyot	(France) Sébastien Scarnato	(France) Nicolas Dussauge	Suzuki GSX-R 750	GMT94
2002	(France) Jean-Michel Bayle	(France) Sébastien Gimbert	(France) Nicolas Dussauge	Suzuki GSX-R 750	SERT
2003	(United Kingdom) Brian Morrison	(France) Philippe Dobé	(France) Vincent Philippe	Suzuki GSX-R 1000	SERT
2004	(France) Stéphane Chambon	(Japan) Keiichi Kitagawa	(Australia) Warwick Nowland	Suzuki GSX-R 1000	SERT
2005	(Spain) David Checa	(France) William Costes	(France) Sébastien Gimbert	Yamaha YZF-R1	GMT94 Yamaha
2006	(France) Olivier Four	(France) Frédéric Protat	(Spain) Daniel Ribalta-Bosch	Honda CBR 1000 RR	National Moto
2007	(France) William Costes	(France) Guillaume Dietrich	(Germany) Max Neukirchner	Suzuki GSX-R 1000	SERT
2008	(France) William Costes	(France) Guillaume Dietrich	(Netherlands) Barry Veneman	Suzuki GSX-R 1000	SERT
2009	(France) Gwen Giabbani	(Australia) Steve Martin	(Slovenia) Igor Jerman	Yamaha YZF-R1	Yamaha Austria Racing Team
2010	(France) Julien Da Costa	(France) Olivier Four	(France) Grégory Leblanc	Kawasaki ZX-10R	Team SRC Kawasaki France
2011	(France) Julien Da Costa	(France) Olivier Four	(France) Grégory Leblanc	Kawasaki ZX-10R	Team SRC Kawasaki France
2012	(France) Julien Da Costa	(France) Freddy Foray	(France) Grégory Leblanc	Kawasaki ZX-10R	Team SRC Kawasaki France
2013	(France) Grégory Leblanc	(France) Fabien Foret	(France) Nicolas Salchaud	Kawasaki ZX-10R	Team SRC Kawasaki France
2014	(France) Vincent Philippe	(France) Anthony Delhalle	(France) Erwan Nigon	Suzuki GSX-R 1000	SERT
2015	(France) Vincent Philippe	(France) Anthony Delhalle	(France) Étienne Masson	Suzuki GSX-R 1000	SERT
2016	(France) Grégory Leblanc	(France) Matthieu Lagrive	(France) Fabien Foret	Kawasaki ZX-10R	Team SRC Kawasaki France
2017	(France) Mike Di Meglio	(Spain) David Checa	(Italy) Niccolò Canepa	Yamaha YZF-R1	GMT94 Yamaha
2018	(Australia) Josh Hook	(France) Freddy Foray	(France) Alan Techer	Honda CBR 1000 RR	FCC TSR Honda France
2019	(France) Jérémy Guarnoni	(Spain) David Checa	(France) Erwan Nigon	Kawasaki ZX-10RR	Team SRC Kawasaki France
2020	(Australia) Josh Hook	(France) Freddy Foray	(France) Mike Di Meglio	Honda CBR 1000 RR-R	FCC TSR Honda France
2021	(France) Gregg Black	(Belgium) Xavier Simeon	(France) Sylvain Guintoli	Suzuki GSX-R 1000	Yoshimura SERT Motul
2022	(France) Gregg Black	(Belgium) Xavier Simeon	(France) Sylvain Guintoli	Suzuki GSX-R 1000	Yoshimura SERT Motul
2023	(Australia) Josh Hook	(France) Mike Di Meglio	(France) Alan Techer	Honda CBR 1000 RR-R	FCC TSR Honda France
2024	(France) Gregg Black	(France) Etienne Masson	(United Kingdom) Dan Linfoot	Suzuki GSX-R 1000	Yoshimura SERT Motul
2025	(Czech Republic) Karel Hanika	(Germany) Marvin Fritz	(Australia) Jason O'Halloran	Yamaha YZF-R1	Yamaha Austria Racing Team
2026	(Czech Republic) Karel Hanika	(Germany) Marvin Fritz	(Argentina) Leandro Mercado	Yamaha YZF-R1	Yamaha Austria Racing Team

=== By manufacturer ===
Rank	Wins	Manufacturer	Years
1	15	(Japan) Suzuki	1982, 1984, 1985, 1997, 2001, 2002, 2003, 2004, 2007, 2008, 2014, 2015, 2021, 2022, 2024
2	14	(Japan) Kawasaki	1981, 1983, 1992, 1993, 1994, 1996, 1998, 1999, 2010, 2011, 2012, 2013, 2016, 2019
2	14	(Japan) Honda	1978, 1979, 1980, 1986, 1987, 1988, 1989, 1990, 1995, 2000, 2006, 2018, 2020, 2023
4	6	(Japan) Yamaha	1991, 2005, 2009, 2017, 2025, 2026

=== By rider ===
Rank	Riders	Wins	Years
1	(France) Alex Vieira	5	1986, 1988, 1989, 1990, 1995
1	(France) Grégory Leblanc	5	2010, 2011, 2012, 2013, 2016
3	(France) Jean-Michel Mattioli	4	1987, 1988, 1989, 1990
3	(United Kingdom) Brian Morrison	4	1993, 1995, 1996, 2003
3	(France) William Costes	4	2000, 2005, 2007, 2008
6	(France) Jean-Claude Chemarin	3	1978, 1979, 1981
6	(France) Sébastien Gimbert	3	2000, 2002, 2005
6	(France) Olivier Four	3	2006, 2010, 2011
6	(France) Julien Da Costa	3	2010, 2011, 2012
6	(France) Vincent Philippe	3	2003, 2014, 2015
6	(Spain) David Checa	3	2005, 2017, 2019
6	(France) Freddy Foray	3	2012, 2018, 2020
6	(Australia) Joshua Hook	3	2018, 2020, 2023
6	(France) Mike Di Meglio	3	2017, 2020, 2023
6	(France) Gregg Black	3	2021, 2022, 2024

== See also ==
- FIM Endurance World Championship
