= Rising step load testing =

Rising Step Load Testing (or RSL testing) is a testing system that can apply loads in tension or bending to evaluate hydrogen-induced cracking (also called hydrogen embrittlement). It was specifically designed to conduct the accelerated ASTM F1624 step-modified, slow strain rate tests on a variety of test coupons or structural components. It can also function to conduct conventional ASTM E8 tensile tests; ASTM F519 200-hr Sustained Load Tests with subsequent programmable step loads to rupture for increased reliability; and ASTM G129 Slow Strain Rate Tensile tests.

== Testing ==
The RSL Testing System can be applied to all of the specimen geometries in ASTM F519, including Notched Round Tensile Bars, Notched C-Rings, and Notched Square Bars. Product testing of actual hardware can also be conducted, such as with fasteners. Taking mechanical advantage of by testing in bending allows large diameter bolts to be tested with only a 1-kip load cell.

=== Test precision ===
The RSL Test Method has been demonstrated as a valuable tool in the testing of high-performance materials for determining susceptibility to hydrogen embrittlement. This test is dependent upon the test machine’s capability to provide a profile with incremental increases in the applied stress as a function of time. It is imperative that the load increases do not overshoot the next elevation in applied stress. This is achieved through careful design and operation of the loading mechanisms. Once this is achieved, repeatability is good with variance in the low single digits that are probably related more to surface roughness, internal defects, and other intrinsic material properties differences rather than the testing equipment.

=== Crack sensitivity detection ===
Precision in controlling the load allows for greater sensitivity in measuring crack extension via load drop and compliance correlation than obtainable with high-voltage electrical resistivity measurements and eliminates the need for clip gages. This capability allows for precise electronic detection of the maximum load required for Crack Tip Opening Displacement calculations of Fracture Toughness and precise detection of the onset of crack growth required for measurement of the threshold stress for hydrogen embrittlement, environmental or stress corrosion cracking.

== Benefits ==
- Speed: One of the major advantages of the RSL Test Method is the time in which valid and reproducible results can be obtained. One example is the long used Sustained Load Test of notched round bar tensile specimens found in ASTM F 519. In this test, the exposed test specimens are subjected to a load equal to 75% of the Fracture Strength and held for 200 hours. If the specimen does not break, the specimen has passed. If it fractures prior to the 200 hours then it has failed. The RSL test method can provide the same information in less than two days and will also give a percentage of Fracture Strength value which provides very valuable additional information: it can demonstrate if the threshold exceeds the 75% mark and by how much.
- Simultaneous testing: Four or five specimens can be run at the same time, allowing very rapid characterization of materials on a batch-by-batch basis.
- Accuracy: Another benefit it the quantitative nature of the test, which makes it much more useful for comparing batch-to-batch or for evaluating different coatings, materials, machining effects, cleaners, and other variables that may affect the hydrogen embrittlement of materials.
- Fast Results- Similarly, an ASTM E1681 KIscc determination can take 12 specimens and up to 14-months because of the necessary run out times to confirm the threshold level. Using the RSL Test Method can provide the same results with 5-coupons in one to two days.
- Ability to evaluate multiple materials properties: with just two specimens, the RSL testing equipment can be quickly used to determine (1) yield and ultimate tensile strength, (2) fracture toughness including K1_CTOD, (3) environmentally assisted cracking threshold K1C_SCC, and the dynamic tearing modulus.
