= Phase One Endurance =

Phase One Endurance was a motorcycle endurance team formed in 1985 by Russell Benney and Martin Prout. They won the Endurance World Championship title in 1993, 2000, and 2003.

== 2008 season ==
Phase One Endurance secured 10th place in their class at the 24 Hours of Le Mans race. Beginning at 15th, they reached 3rd before riders James Haydon and James McBride both crashed during the night and finished the race in 10th.

Phase One Endurance achieved 4th place in both the Oschersleben 8 hours race, and the Bol d'Or 24hr race in which they came 8th overall. A crash in the final race of the year in Qatar caused them to finish 9th.

== 2009 season ==
Phase One used the 2009 Yamaha YZF-R1s ridden by Pedro Vallcanaras, Damian Cudlin, and Alex Cudlin.
