= Damian Cudlin =

Australian motorcycle racer

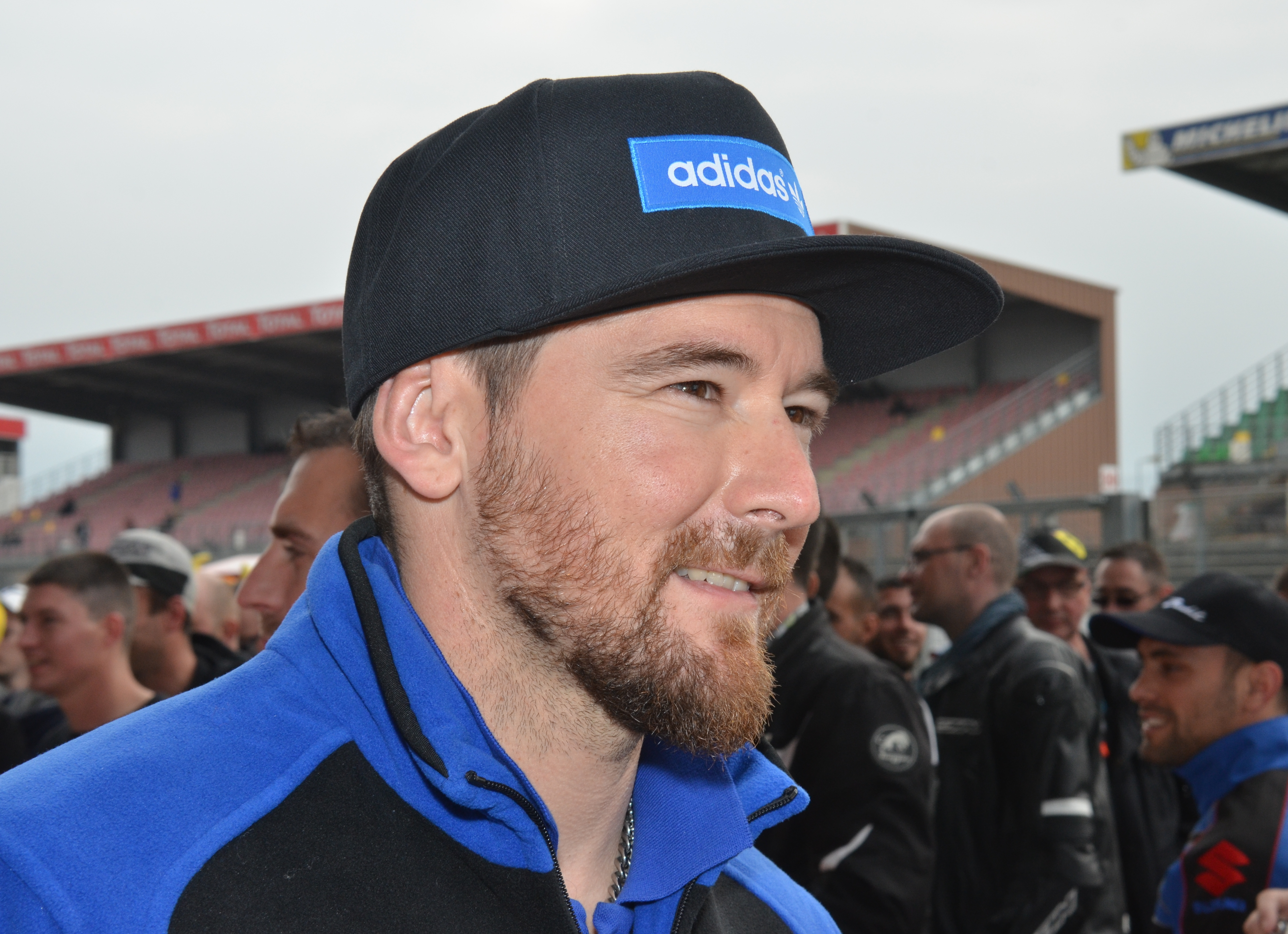
- Damian Cudlin aux 24 Heures Moto 2015
- Nationality: Australian
- Born: 19 October 1982 (age 44); Blacktown, New South Wales, Australia
- Current team: F.C.C. TSR Honda
- Bike number: 5
- Website: damian-cudlin.com
Motorcycle racing career statistics
MotoGP World Championship
Active years	2011, 2013, 2015
Manufacturers	Ducati, PBM, ART
Championships	0
2015 championship position	NC (0 pts)
Starts / Wins / Podiums / Poles / F. laps / Points; 8 / 0 / 0 / 0 / 0 / 0
Moto2 World Championship
Active years	2010, 2012
Manufacturers	Pons Kalex, Bimota
Championships	0
2012 championship position	NC (0 pts)
Starts / Wins / Podiums / Poles / F. laps / Points; 3 / 0 / 0 / 0 / 0 / 9

Damian Shane Cudlin (born 19 October 1982) is an Australian professional motorcycle racer. He runs in endurance and national Superbike championships, as well as World Championships.

Cudlin competed in the FIM Endurance World Championship from 2002 to 2018 and finished second in the world championship on three occasions: 2011, 2012 and 2014. He was a fourth rider in the SERT (Suzuki Endurance Racing Team) who won the Endurance World Championship in 2015. After winning the 2010 IDM Supersport Championship, he made his grand prix debut at the German Grand Prix in 2010 where he finished seventh. He was drafted into MotoGP in 2011 and raced sporadically for various teams until 2015. He has also previously competed in the IDM Superbike Championship, World Supersport Championship, the Australian Formula Xtreme Championship, the Australian Superbike Championship and the AMA Superbike Championship.

== Career statistics ==
=== Supersport World Championship ===
==== Races by year ====
Year	Bike	1	2	3	4	5	6	7	8	9	10	11	12	13	Pos.	Pts
2002	Yamaha	SPA	AUS; Ret	RSA	JPN	ITA	GBR	GER	SMR	GBR	GER	NED	ITA		NC	0
2013	Honda	AUS	SPA	NED	ITA	GBR	POR	ITA	RUS	GBR	GER	TUR; Ret	FRA	SPA	NC	0

=== Superstock European Championship ===
==== Races by year ====
(key) (Races in bold indicate pole position) (Races in italics indicate fastest lap)

Year	Bike	1	2	3	4	5	6	7	8	9	Pos	Pts
2003	Suzuki	VAL	MNZ	OSC	SIL	SMR	BRA	NED	IMO	MAG; 13	29th	3

=== MotoAmerica SuperBike Championship ===
Year	Class	Team	1	2		3		4		5		6		7	8		9		10		11		Pos	Pts
Year	Class	Team	R1	R1	R2	R1	R2	R1	R2	R1	R2	R1	R2	R1	R1	R2	R1	R2	R1	R2	R1	R2	Pos	Pts
2009	SuperBike	Suzuki	DAY	FON	FON	RAT	RAT	BAR	BAR	INF	INF	RAM	RAM	LAG	OHI	OHI	HRT	HRT	VIR	VIR	NJE; 9	NJE; 8	29th	25

=== Grand Prix motorcycle racing ===
==== By season ====
Season	Class	Motorcycle	Team	Race	Win	Podium	Pole	FLap	Pts	Plcd
2010	Moto2	Kalex Moto2	Tenerife 40 Pons	1	0	0	0	0	9	31st
2011	MotoGP	Ducati Desmosedici GP11	Pramac Racing Team	1	0	0	0	0	0	NC
2011	MotoGP	Ducati Desmosedici GP11	Mapfre Aspar Team MotoGP	1	0	0	0	0	0	NC
2012	Moto2	Bimota HB4	SAG Team	2	0	0	0	0	0	NC
2013	MotoGP	PBM	Paul Bird Motorsport	5	0	0	0	0	0	NC
2015	MotoGP	ART	E-Motion IodaRacing Team	2	0	0	0	0	0	NC
Total				**11**	**0**	**0**	**0**	**0**	**9**	

==== By class ====
Class	Seas	1st GP	1st Pod	1st Win	Race	Win	Podiums	Pole	FLap	Pts	WChmp
Moto2	2010, 2012	2010 Germany			3	0	0	0	0	9	0
MotoGP	2011, 2013, 2015	2011 Japan			8	0	0	0	0	0	0
Total	2010–2013, 2015				**11**	**0**	**0**	**0**	**0**	**9**	**0**

==== Races by year ====
(key)

Year	Class	Bike	1	2	3	4	5	6	7	8	9	10	11	12	13	14	15	16	17	18	Pos.	Pts
2010	Moto2	Pons Kalex	QAT	SPA	FRA	ITA	GBR	NED	CAT	GER; 7	CZE	INP	RSM	ARA	JPN	MAL	AUS	POR	VAL		31st	9
2011	MotoGP	Ducati	QAT	SPA	POR	FRA	CAT	GBR	NED	ITA	GER	USA	CZE	INP	RSM	ARA	JPN; Ret	AUS; DNS	MAL	VAL	NC	0
2012	Moto2	Bimota	QAT	SPA	POR	FRA	CAT	GBR	NED; Ret	GER; 21	ITA	INP	CZE	RSM	ARA	JPN	MAL	AUS	VAL		NC	0
2013	MotoGP	PBM	QAT	AME	SPA	FRA	ITA	CAT	NED	GER	USA	INP	CZE	GBR	RSM	ARA; Ret	MAL; Ret	AUS; 21	JPN; 21	VAL; Ret	NC	0
2015	MotoGP	ART	QAT	AME	ARG	SPA	FRA	ITA	CAT	NED	GER	INP	CZE	GBR	RSM	ARA	JPN	AUS; Ret	MAL; Ret	VAL	NC	0

=== FIM Endurance World Championship ===
==== By team ====
Year	Team	Bike	Rider	TC
2006	(United Kingdom) Phase One Endurance	Yamaha YZF-R1	(Australia) Warwick Nowland (France) Damian Cudlin (Sweden) Christer Miinin	3rd
2007	(Austria) Yamaha Austrian Racing Team	Yamaha YZF-R1	(Slovenia) Igor Jerman (France) Sebastien Scamato (Australia) Damian Cudlin	3rd
2011	(Belgium) BMW Motorrad France	BMW S1000RR	(France) Sébastien Gimbert (France) Erwan Nigon (France) Damian Cudlin (France) Hugo Marchand	2nd
2012	(Belgium) BMW Motorrad France	BMW S1000RR	(France) Sébastien Gimbert (France) Erwan Nigon (France) Damian Cudlin	2nd
2014	(France) Suzuki Endurance Racing Team	Suzuki GSX-R 1000	(France) Anthony Delhalle (France) Erwan Nigon (France) Vincent Philippe (Australia) Damian Cudlin	2nd
