= Christophe Guyot =

French motorcycle racer

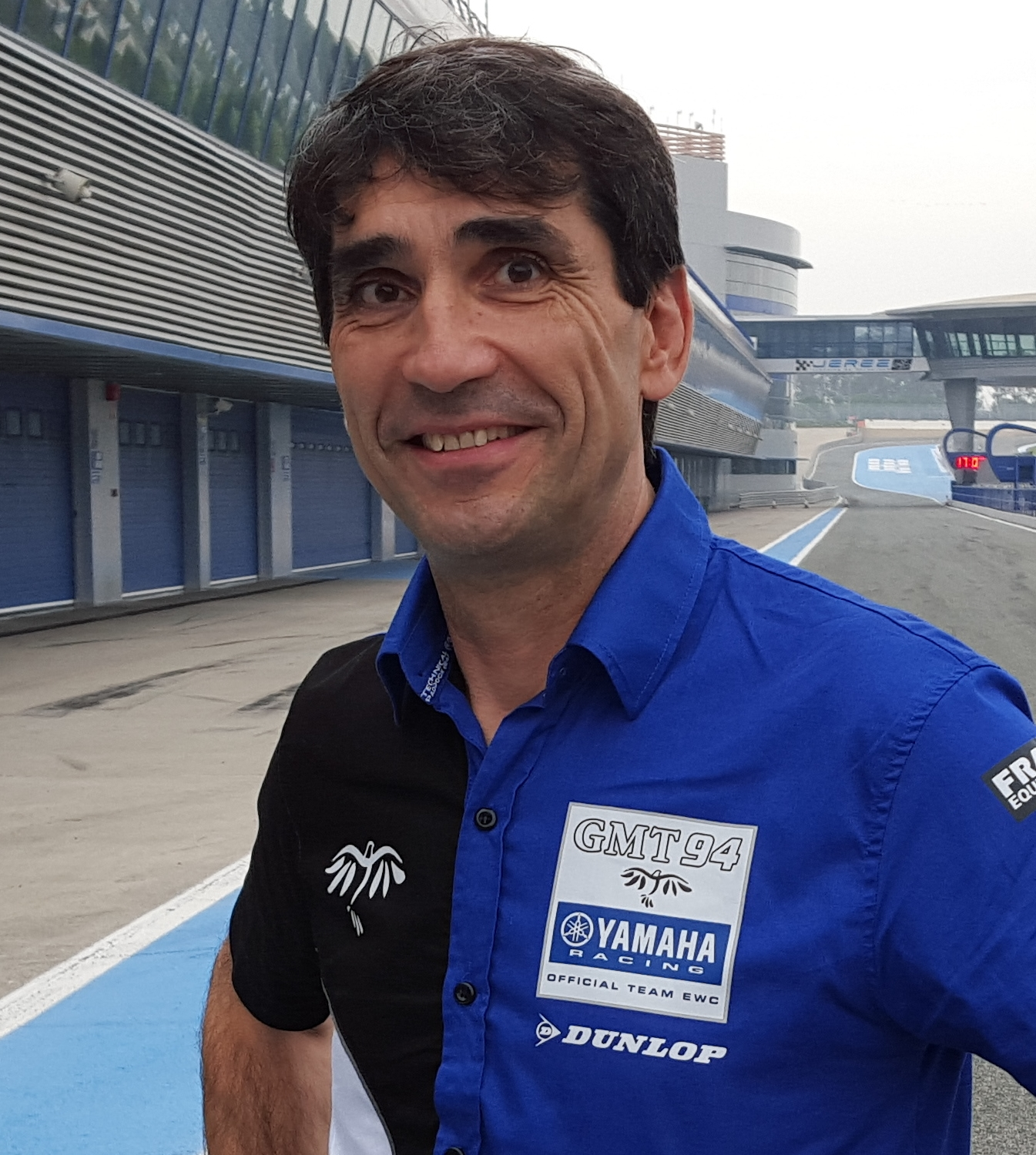
- Nationality: French
- Born: July 13, 1962 (age 64); Marseille
- Current team: GMT94

Christophe Guyot (French: [kʁistɔf ɡɥijo]; born July 13, 1962) is a French speed and endurance motorcycle rider, 24 Hours of Le Mans winner, Endurance World Champion and French Superbike Champion. Born in Marseille, he founded the GMT94 motorcycle team.

As of 2017, Guyot was the only rider/manager to win the 24 Hours of Le Mans motorbike race.

Following a third world title in Endurance (2017), and still led by Guyot, GMT94 moved up to superbike racing in 2018 in the Supersport World Championship and became runner-up in the 2019 World Championship. GMT94 and Guyot entered the World Superbike Championship in 2023.

Guyot is also a consultant for the Eurosport television channel.

== Career ==
=== Racer and team manager ===
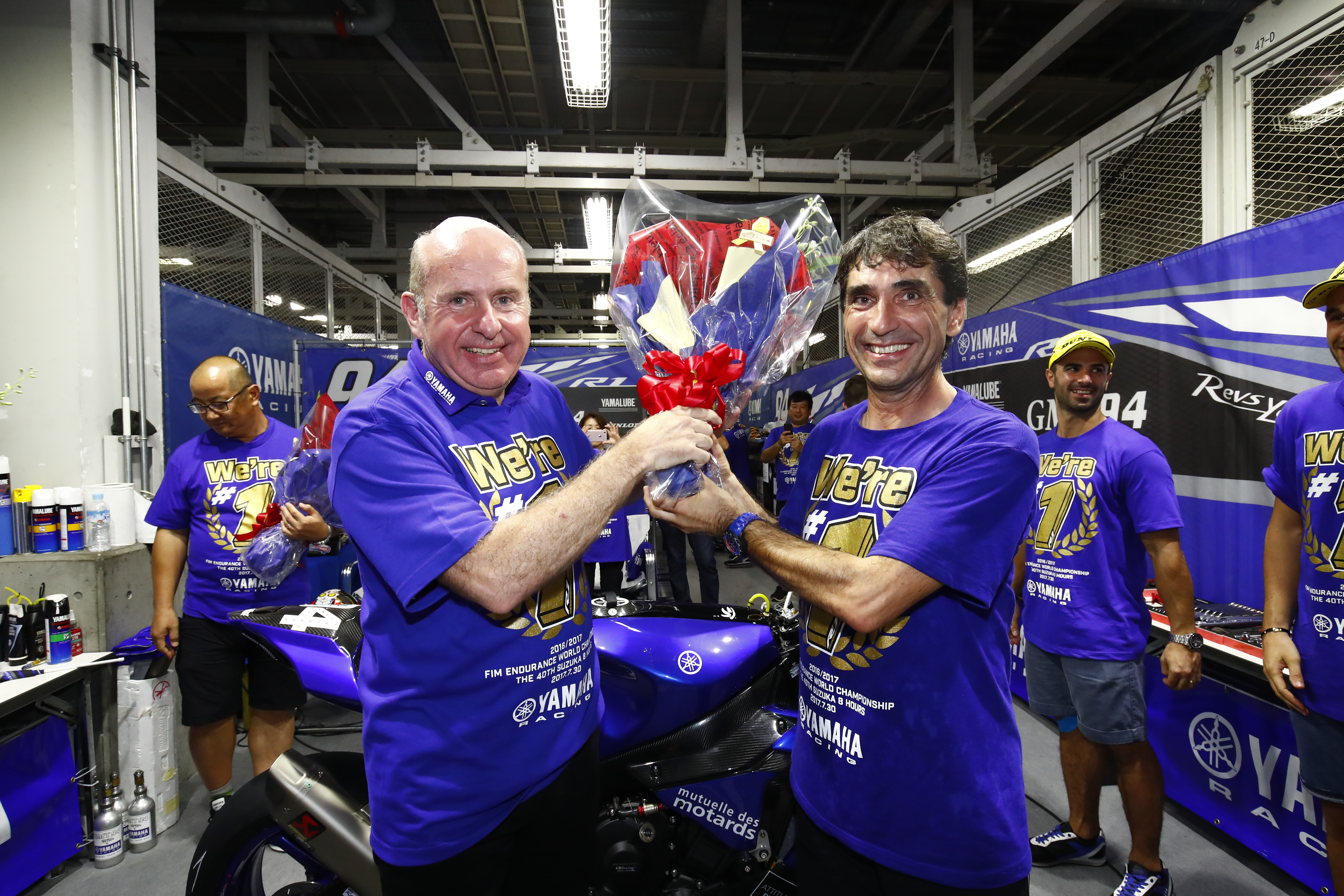
Eric de Seynes and Christophe Guyot (Suzuka, 2017)

After obtaining a school-teaching diploma in 1984, and then a DEUG in history in 1986, Guyot decided in 1989 at the age of 28 to leave teaching school to concentrate on motorcycling. For his first season, in the Promosport 350 and behind the handlebars of a Yamaha RD350LC, he won two races and finished on the rostrum three times. In 1990, he moved to the upper class and rode in Promosport 750, a category in which he won three races.

In 1991, Guyot decided to found his own team, Guyot Motorcycle Team, called GMT94, 94 being the French department number of Val-de-Marne. He raced for three seasons in the Superbike World Championship, accumulating a total of 16 races throughout the 1991, 1992 and 1993 seasons.

GMT94 was the official Yamaha team in the Endurance World Championship until 2018, and is currently the official Yamaha team in the Supersport World Championship. The team won three endurance world championship titles, three victories in the 24 Hours Moto and two victories in the Bol d'Or, and is also a four-time French Superbike Champion. Guyot was also the representative of the riders from 1994 to 2004.

After three years of travelling the world, Guyot decided to return to France winning the title of French Superbike champion in 1998. In 1999, he decided to devote himself exclusively to the Endurance World Championship.

The following year was GMT94's first victory at the 24-hour race in Oschersleben (2000), Germany. In 2001, he won the 24 Hours Moto. As of 2017, he was the only rider/manager to have won this event. In 2002, Guyot won the 8 Hours of Brno.

During the 2004 season, he won the 8 Hours of Zhuhai with David Checa and William Costes, and became Endurance. Guyot offered Yamaha his first title in World Endurance Championship. The following season, Guyot announced he would stop his rider career to devote himself to new projects, still with GMT94. However, he remained a substitute until 2007 and competed again in a race in 2011, where he won, with his rider David Checa, the 5 Hours of Circuit Carole (Trophée Grégory Lemarchal).

After the 2004 season, Yamaha decided to provide "official" support to GMT94. In 2018, Guyot decided to partially enter the Supersport World Championship with Mike Di Meglio then with a young rider: Corentin Perolari. Afterwards, GMT94 ended its commitment to Endurance in order to devote itself fully to the Supersport World Championship.

Guyot was a member of the executive committee of the French Federation of Motorcycling, from 2004-2008 and 2012–2016.

In 2019, at the end of a successful season, GMT94 became runner-up in Supersport with Jules Cluzel and Corentin Perolari. The team continued on to the World Superbike Championship in 2023 with Italian rider Lorenzo Baldassarri.

=== Consultant ===
In addition to his role as team manager of GMT94, Guyot is also a consultant for the Eurosport television channel on the Superbike World Championship (WSBK), Endurance and British Superbike. Between 2012 and 2018, when the channel owned the broadcasting rights for MotoGP, he also delivered his analysis during the Dimanche Méca and Warm-up shows with Guenaelle Longy, Christophe Malbranque, and Lionel Rosso. Since 2019, Guyot has been a consultant for the Motorcycle Endurance World e Championship (EWC) alongside Gilles della Posta, Rémy Tissier and Romain Hussonnois.

Guyot is also involved with the Mutuelle des Motards in projects aimed at youth and has a role as a trainer of riders for Yamaha.

Every year, Guyot supervises riding lessons with Circuit Carole.

== Principal triumphs ==
Year	Category	Title
1998	Superbike	French Superbike Champion
2000	Endurance	Endurance World Championship Runner-up; Oscherleben 24 Hours Winner
2001	Endurance	Endurance World Championship Runner-up; Nürbürgring 6 Hours Winner; Le Mans 24 Hours Winner
2002	Endurance	Brno 8 Hours Winner
2004	Endurance	Endurance World Championship Champion; Zhuhai 8 Hours Winner
2011	Endurance	Circuit Carole 5 Hours Winner (Grégory le Marchal Trophy)

== Career statistics ==
=== FIM Endurance World Championship ===
Year	Bike	Rider	TC
2000	Kawasaki	(France) Nicolas Dussauge (France) Christophe Guyot (France) Sébastien Scarnato	3rd

==== By team ====
Year	Team	Bike	Rider	TC
2002	(France) Yamaha - GMT94	Yamaha YZF-R1	(France) William Costes (France) Christophe Guyot (France) Sebastien Scarnato	3rd
2003	(France) Yamaha - GMT94	Yamaha YZF-R1	(France) William Costes (France) Sebastien Gimbert (France) Christophe Guyot (Spain) David Checa (France) Sebastien Scarnato	3rd
2004	(France) GMT94	Yamaha YZF-R1	(France) William Costes (France) Sebastien Gimbert (France) Christophe Guyot (Spain) David Checa	1st
