= Christian Lavieille =

French motorcycle racer

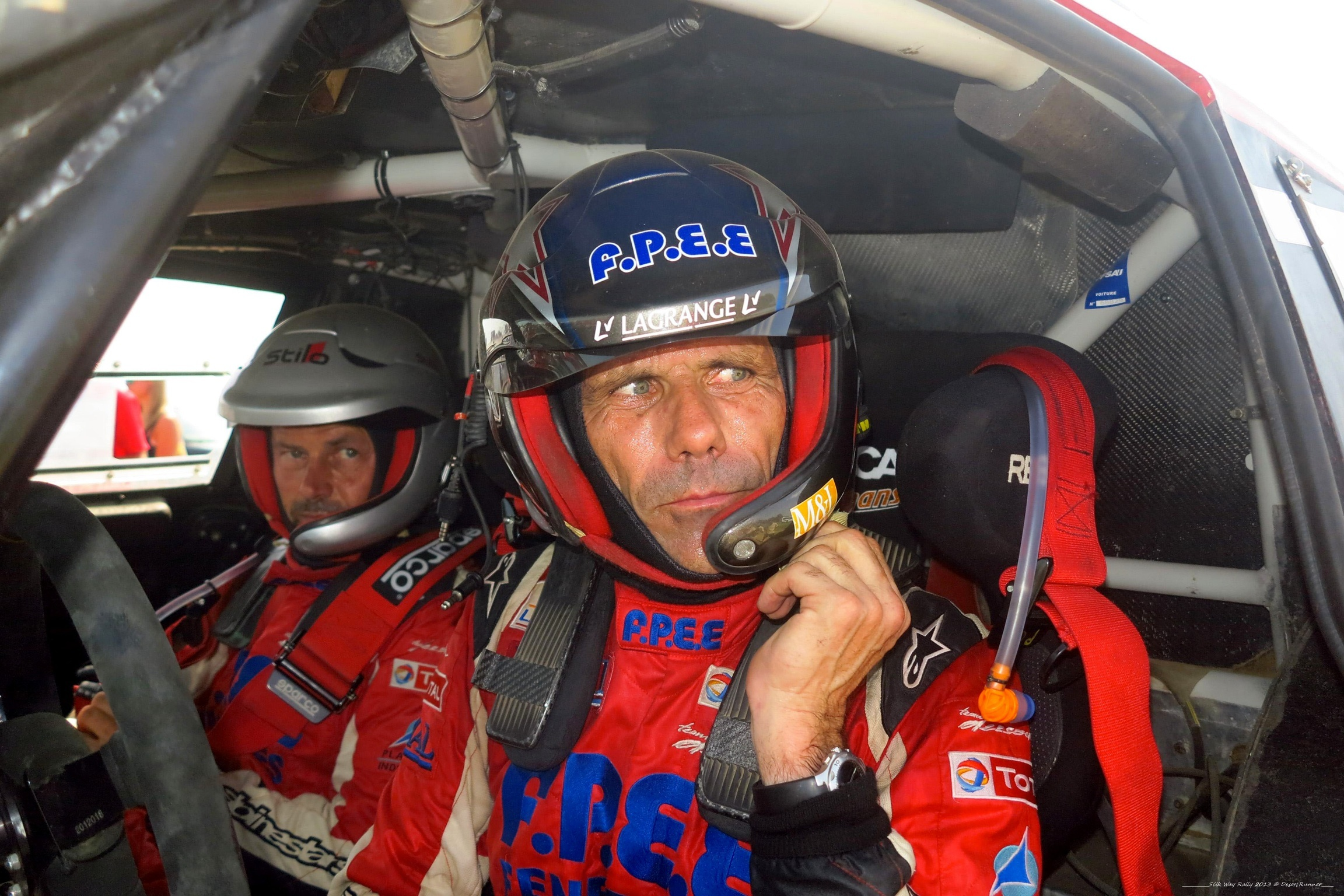
- Nationality: French
- Born: Christian Jean Paul Lavieille; 16 December 1965 (age 60) Villefranche-sur-Saône, France
24 Hours of Le Mans career
- Years: 2002–2004
- Teams: Luc Alphand Aventures
- Best finish: 16th (2004)
- Class wins: 0

Christian Jean Paul Lavieille (born 16 December 1965) is a French racing driver and former motorcycle road racer.

As a motorcycle racer, Lavieille won the FIM Endurance World Championship in 1998 and the Bol d'Or three times (1996, 1999 and 2001).

== FIM Endurance World Championship ==
Year	Bike	Rider	TC
1996	Honda RC45	(France) Alex Vieira (France) Christian Lavieille (France) William Costes	2nd
1997	Honda RC45	(France) Christian Lavieille	3rd
1998	Honda RC45	(United States) Doug Polen (France) Christian Lavieille	1st
1999	Suzuki	(France) Christian Lavieille	2nd

== 24 Hours of Le Mans results ==
Year	Team	Co-Drivers	Car	Class	Laps	Pos.	Class Pos.
2002	(France) Luc Alphand Aventures	(France) Luc Alphand (France) Olivier Thévenin	Porsche 911 GT3-RS	GT	299	24th	5th
2004	(France) Luc Alphand Aventures	(France) Luc Alphand (France) Philippe Almeras	Porsche 911 GT3-RS	GT	316	16th	5th

Preceded by Doug Polen; Peter Goddard	Endurance FIM World Champion; 1998; With: Doug Polen	Succeeded by Jéhan d'Orgeix; Terry Rymer
