= Sébastien Gimbert =

French motorcycle racer

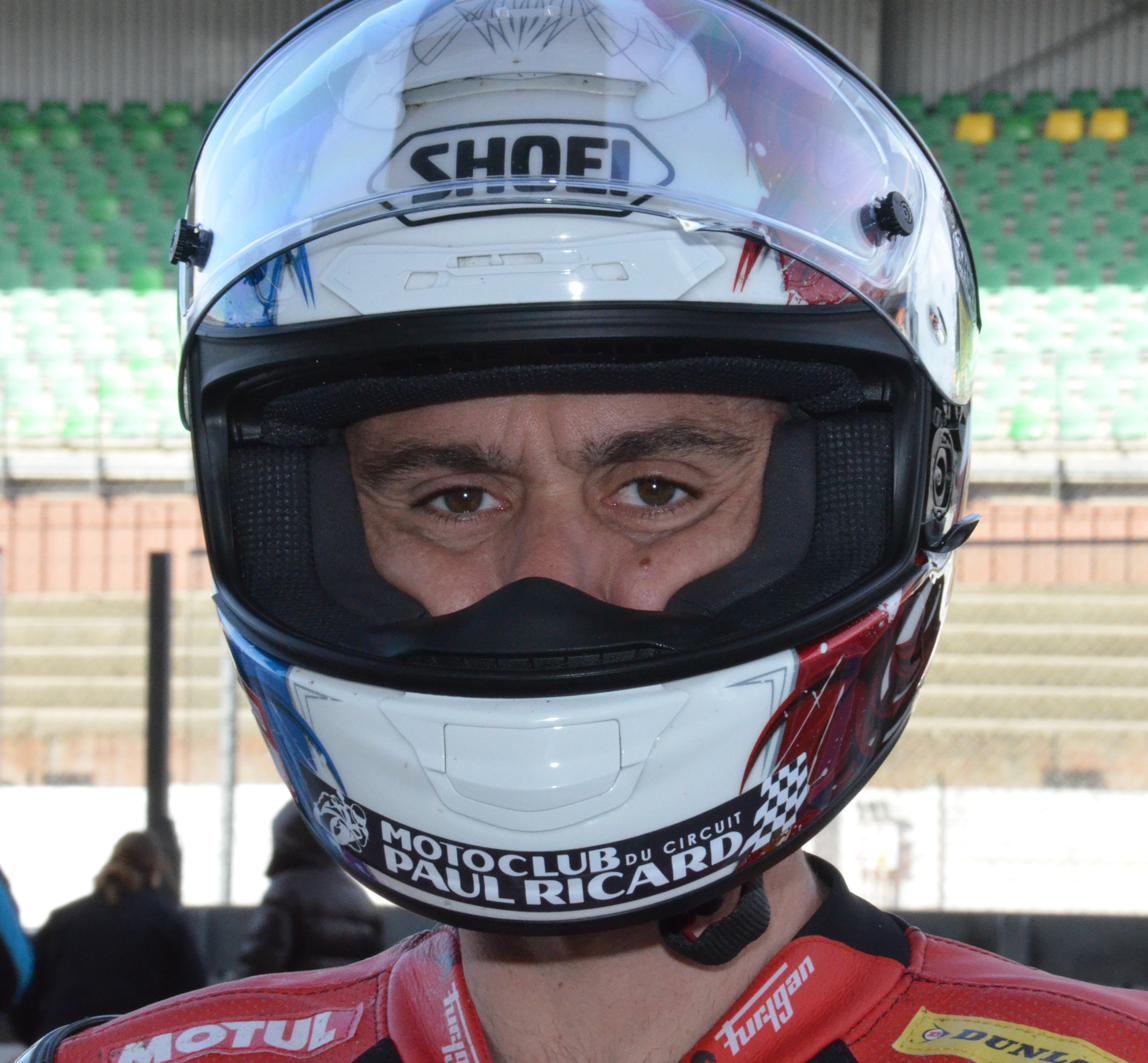
- 24 Heures Moto in 2016
- Nationality: French
- Born: 9 September 1977 (age 49); Le Puy-en-Velay, France
- Current team: Honda Endurance Racing Team
- Bike number: 111

Sébastien Gimbert (born 9 September 1977 in Le Puy-en-Velay, France) is a professional motorcycle road racer. He currently competes in the Endurance FIM World Championship aboard a Honda CBR1000RR. His greatest success has come in the Endurance World Championship, and the bulk of his career has been spent on Yamaha YZF-R1 with more recent seasons spent on BMW S1000RR and Honda CBR1000RR motorcycles.

Gimbert was France's 250cc champion in 1996 and 1997, before moving up to the 500cc World Championship on a privately entered Honda in 1998 and 1999, and racing in the 250cc World Championship in 2000, without many front-running displays.

From 2002 to 2004, Gimbert was primarily an endurance racer. He has won the biggest 24-hour races in the sport - Le Mans, Spa-Francorchamps and the Bol d'Or. He helped the team to the Endurance World Championship in 2004.

Gimbert also remained active in shorter races, finishing second in the French Super Production series in 2003 and doing several rounds a year later. He also raced his R1 in three Superbike World Championship races, taking a pair of fourth places despite two slow starts at Magny-Cours in 2004, a year with few manufacturer backed bikes. As a result of this, he was hired by Yamaha Motor France as their second rider in WSBK for 2005. He finished 16th overall in 2005, and 19th (without a top-ten finish) in 2006.

Gimbert raced in the Supersport World Championship for 2007 finishing 20th overall. He also won the 2007 Bol d'Or endurance race. In 2009, he won the French Superbike Championship.

== Career statistics ==
1993 - 2nd, French Yamaha TZR125 Championship Yamaha TZR125
1994 - 11th, French 125cc Championship Honda RS125R
1995 - 4th, French 250cc Championship Honda RS250R
1996 - 5th, European 250cc Championship Honda RS250R / 1st, French 250cc Championship Honda RS250R
1997 - 6th, European 250cc Championship Honda RS250R / 1st, French 250cc Championship #1 Honda RS250R
1998 - 30th, 500cc Grand Prix #22 Honda NSR500V
1999 - 19th, 500cc Grand Prix #22 Honda NSR500V
2000 - 22nd, 500cc Grand Prix #22 Honda NSR500V / 22nd, 250cc World Championship Honda RS250R
2001 - French Supersport 600 Championship #22 Honda CBR600RR
2002 - 1st, Le Mans 24 Hours / 1st, Bol d'Or Suzuki GSX-R1000
2003 - 2nd, Le Mans 24 Hours / 1st, 24 Hours of Spa / 1st, Bol d'Or Suzuki GSX-R1000
2004 - 1st, Endurance FIM World Championship #94 Yamaha YZF-R1
2005 - 16th, Superbike World Championship #32 Yamaha YZF-R1
2006 - 19th, Superbike World Championship #16 Yamaha YZF-R1
2007 - 20th, Supersport World Championship #194 Yamaha YZF-R6 / 7th, Endurance FIM World Championship #94 Yamaha YZF-R1
2008 - 29th, Superbike World Championship #194 Yamaha YZF-R1
2009 - 1st, French Superbike Championship #94 Yamaha YZF-R1
2010 - 2nd, French Superbike Championship #1 BMW S1000RR / 9th, Endurance FIM World Championship #94 Yamaha YZF-R1
2011 - 1st, French Superbike Championship #7 BMW S1000RR / 2nd, Endurance FIM World Championship #99 BMW S1000RR
2012 - 2nd, French Superbike Championship #7 BMW S1000RR / 2nd, Endurance FIM World Championship #99 BMW S1000RR
2013 - 17th, CIV Superbike Championship #7 BMW S1000RR / 12th, Endurance FIM World Championship #99 BMW S1000RR
2014 - 2nd, French Superbike Championship #7 Honda CBR1000RR / 7th, Endurance FIM World Championship #111 Honda CBR1000RR
2015 - 3rd, French Superbike Championship #7 Honda CBR1000RR / 9th, Endurance FIM World Championship #111 Honda CBR1000RR
2016 - Endurance FIM World Championship #111 Honda CBR1000RR

=== Grand Prix motorcycle racing ===
==== Races by year ====
(key) (Races in bold indicate pole position, races in italics indicate fastest lap)

Year	Class	Bike	1	2	3	4	5	6	7	8	9	10	11	12	13	14	15	16	17	Pos	Pts
1997	250cc	Honda	MAL	JPN	SPA	ITA	AUT	FRA; 13	NED	IMO	GER	BRA	GBR	CZE	CAT	INA	AUS			32nd	3

=== FIM Endurance World Championship ===
==== By team ====
Year	Team	Bike	Rider	TC
2001	(France) Honda Elf	Honda VTR1000SPW	(France) Fabien Foret (France) William Costes (France) Sebastien Gimbert (France) Sébastien Charpentier	3rd
2003	(France) Yamaha - GMT94	Yamaha YZF-R1	(France) William Costes (France) Sebastien Gimbert (France) Christophe Guyot (Spain) David Checa (France) Sebastien Scarnato	3rd
2004	(France) GMT94	Yamaha YZF-R1	(France) William Costes (France) Sebastien Gimbert (France) Christophe Guyot (Spain) David Checa	1st
2011	(Belgium) BMW Motorrad France	BMW S1000RR	(France) Sébastien Gimbert (France) Erwan Nigon (France) Damian Cudlin (France) Hugo Marchand	2nd
2012	(Belgium) BMW Motorrad France	BMW S1000RR	(France) Sébastien Gimbert (France) Erwan Nigon (France) Damian Cudlin	2nd
2017–18	(United Kingdom) Honda Endurance Racing	Honda CBR1000RR	(France) Julien Da Costa (France) Sébastien Gimbert (France) Erwan Nigon (Ecuador) Yonny Hernández	3rd
