= Adrien Morillas =

French motorcycle racer

- Nationality: French
- Born: May 30, 1958 (age 68)
Motorcycle racing career statistics
Grand Prix motorcycle racing
Active years	1989 - 1991
First race	1989 250cc Spanish Grand Prix
Last race	1991 500cc Malaysian Grand Prix
Starts / Wins / Podiums / Poles / F. laps / Points; 37 / 0 / 0 / N/A / N/A
Superbike World Championship
Active years	1988, 1992 - 1995
Manufacturers	Yamaha, Kawasaki
1995 championship position	20th
Starts / Wins / Podiums / Poles / F. laps / Points; 63 / 1 / 1 / 0 / 0

Adrien Morillas (born 30 May 1958) is a French former Superbike and Grand Prix motorcycle road racer. He competed in the inaugural Superbike World Championship season in 1988, with French Superbike team - Kawasaki, winning one race at the Hungaroring. His best year in Grand Prix competition was in 1991, when he finished in eleventh place in the 500cc world championship. After his Grand Prix career, Morillas returned to compete in the Superbike World Championship from 1992 to 1995. He participated in the FIM Endurance World Championship in 1993 and 1994, winning the 24 Hours of Le Mans both years. He claimed the Endurance World Championship title for Kawasaki in 1994.

== FIM Endurance World Championship ==
Year	Bike	Rider	TC
1994	Kawasaki ZXR-7	(France) Adrien Morillas	1st
