= Server Efficiency Rating Tool =

The Server Efficiency Rating Tool (SERT) is a performance analysis tool that is specifically designed to address the requirements of the Environmental Protection Agency's ENERGY STAR for Servers v2.0 specification. The SERT Beta 1 was introduced in September, 2011.

Several SPEC member companies contributed to the development of the SERT including AMD, Dell, Fujitsu, HPE, Intel, IBM, and Microsoft.
