= FIM Endurance World Championship =

Long-distance motorcycle track racing series

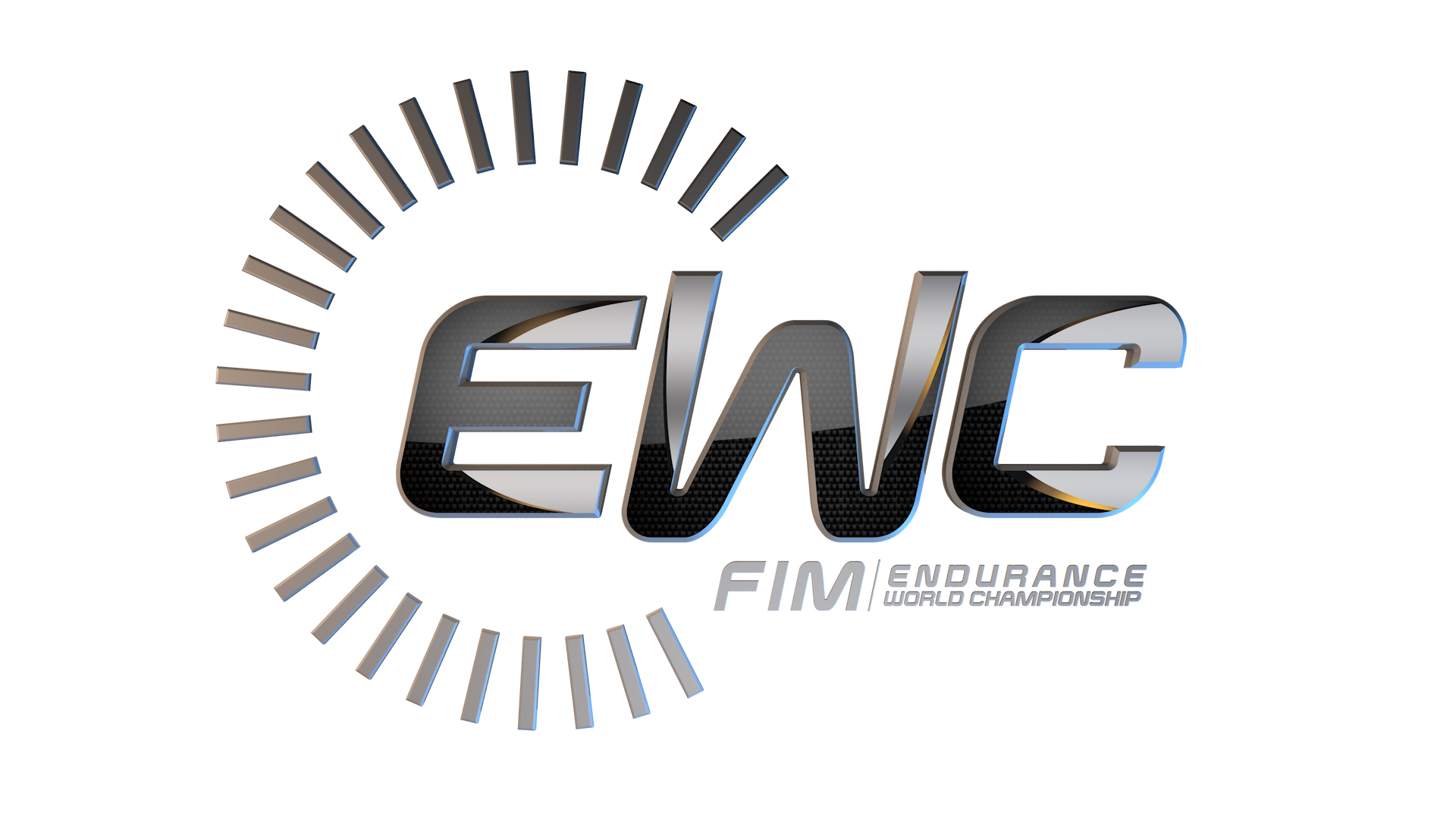
- Category: Motorcycle racing
- Region: International
- Inaugural season: 1960
- Constructors: Suzuki, Yamaha, BMW, Honda, Kawasaki
- Tyre suppliers: Dunlop, Pirelli, Bridgestone
- Riders' champion: (Germany) Marvin Fritz (Czech Republic) Karel Hanika (Australia) Jason O'Halloran
- Makes' champion: (Japan) Yamaha
- Teams' champion: (Austria) YART Yamaha
- Official website: fimewc.com

The Endurance World Championship (FIM EWC) is the premier worldwide endurance championship in motorcycle road racing. The championship season consists of a series of endurance races (with a duration of six, eight, twelve or twenty-four hours) held on permanent racing facilities. The results of each race are combined to determine three World Championships – riders, teams and manufacturers.

Since 2022, the championship has consisted of four races, with the season beginning with the 24 Heures Motos at the Le Mans Bugatti Circuit and finishing at Circuit Paul Ricard for the Bol d’Or. The championship currently visits France twice, as well as Belgium and Japan.

== History ==
The long-distance races appeared almost at the same time of the invention of the internal combustion engine at the end of the 19th century, with races being held between major cities such as Paris-Rouen in 1894, Paris-Bordeaux, Paris-Madrid and others. In those years cars and motos raced together, competing for speed (fastest time) or regularity (achieving a certain objective time). These races on open roads were very dangerous, and the successive fatal tragedies (such as 1903 Paris-Madrid) move the race to roads closed to normal traffic (before the creation of real racing circuits) led to the separation of cars and motos, and the long-distance races turning into rallies.

The Bol d'Or (most famous and prestigious Endurance race) was held for the first time in 1922 on the circuit of Vaujours, near Paris (a beaten-earth road circuit used since 1888 for 24-hour competitions for bicycles). Other endurance races were created after World War II, such as 24 Hour Race in Warsage (Belgium) in 1951, the 500 Miles of Thruxton in 1955, the 24 Hours of Montjuich in Barcelona in 1957, and the 24 hours of Monza (Italy) in 1959.. At the beginning, most races were held over 24 Hours, but soon shorter races were introduced, defined in terms either of distance (500 Miles, 1000 Miles, and much later even 200 Miles) or of time (12 Hours, 8 Hours or 6 Hours).

The series was founded in 1960 as the FIM Endurance Cup. Initially it was made up of four races: Thruxton 500, 24 hours of Montjuïc, 24 hours of Warsage and the Bol d'Or.

The Bol d'Or was not held between 1961 and 1968, while the 1000 km of Paris was held twice on the circuit of Montlhéry. In the first decade, the FIM EC races were held essentially in Great Britain, Italy and Spain – the three countries with more riders

In 1976 the FIM Endurance Cup became the European Championship and in 1980 a World Championship. During the 1980s the Endurance World Championship calendar numbered up to ten events. The championship's popularity gradually declined and the calendar was gradually reduced to just the four so-called "classics": 24 Hours of Le Mans, 24 Hours of Liège (held in Spa-Francorchamps), 8 Hours Of Suzuka, and the Bol d'Or (held mostly on Paul Ricard or Magny-Cours).

In 1989 and 1990 the Championship went back to a World Cup status, as the number of events required by the FIM Sporting Code was not reached.

The 4 events championship (with 24 Hours of Liège being replaced by other races) in the same year was maintained until 2016. In 2015 FIM and the pan-European television sports network, Eurosport signed a deal for the promotion and coverage of the competition. With this, the organization re-ordered the events, in order to the new championship starting in September and finishing in July, with the European races being held during the winter avoiding the MotoGP and Superbikes schedules.

== Circuits ==
=== Current circuits ===
Circuit	Current race title	Years held
(France) Bugatti Circuit	24 Heures du Mans Moto	1971–1975, 1977, 1979, 1981, 1983, 1986, 1988–2001, 2006–present
(Belgium) Circuit de Spa-Francorchamps	8 Hours of Spa EWC Motos	1973–1989, 1991–1998, 2000–2001, 2022–present
(Japan) Suzuka Circuit	Coca-Cola Zero Sugar Suzuka 8 Hours	1980–2019, 2022–present
(France) Circuit Paul Ricard	Bol d'Or	1976, 1978, 1982, 1984–1985, 1989–1993, 1995–1999, 2015–2019, 2022–present

=== Former circuits ===
Circuit	Years held
(Austria) A1-Ring	1980–1987, 1999, 2003
(Portugal) Algarve International Circuit	2016
(Sweden) Anderstorp Raceway	1993
(Czech Republic) Autodrom Most	2021
(France) Autodrome de Linas-Montlhéry	1960, 1970
(Italy) Autodromo Internazionale del Mugello	1975–1976, 1981, 1983–1984
(Italy) Autodromo Internazionale Enzo e Dino Ferrari	1966, 1982, 2002–2003
(Italy) Autodromo Nazionale Monza	1964–1965, 1985, 1987
(Italy) Autodromo Santa Monica	1977–1978, 1980
(West Germany) AVUS	1963
(United Kingdom) Brands Hatch	1966–1968, 1979, 2001
(Czech Republic) Brno Circuit	2001–2003
(United Kingdom) Castle Combe Circuit	1965
(France) Circuit de Nevers Magny-Cours	1987, 1994, 2000–2001, 2006–2014
(Belgium) Circuit Zolder	1972, 2006
(Spain) Circuito de Albacete	2003–2011
(Spain) Circuito de Jerez	1986–87
(Spain) Circuito del Jarama	1969, 1983
(Portugal) Circuito do Estoril	1987, 2000, 2020–2021
(United Kingdom) Donington Park	1981–1982, 1987
(West Germany) Hockenheimring	1986
(Malaysia) Johor Circuit	1991–1992
(Qatar) Lusail International Circuit	2007–2012
(Spain) Montjuïc Circuit	1960–1982
(Germany) Motorsport Arena Oschersleben	1999–2009, 2012–2019
(Germany) Nürburgring	1977–1985, 2001
(Australia) Phillip Island Grand Prix Circuit	1991–1992
(Malaysia) Sepang International Circuit	2019
(United Kingdom) Silverstone Circuit	1983, 2002
Slovakia Ring	2017–2019
(United Kingdom) Thruxton Circuit	1960–1964, 1969–1975, 1977
(Netherlands) TT Circuit Assen	1979–1980, 1995–1996, 2003–2006
(Italy) Vallelunga Circuit	2002–2005
(Belgium) Warsage Circuit (Circuit de Winnerotte)	1960–1961
(China) Zhuhai International Circuit	2004

== World champions ==
1980–1988, 1991–present	World Championship
1989–1990	World Cup

Year	Winning riders	Winning bike	2nd place riders	2nd place bike	3rd place riders	3rd place bike
1980	(France) Marc Fontan (France) Hervé Moineau	Honda	(France) Christian Huguet	Kawasaki	(West Germany) Helmut Dähne	Honda
1981	(France) Jean Lafond (France) Raymond Roche	Kawasaki	(France) Christian Huguet	Kawasaki	(France) Jean-Claude Chemarin	Kawasaki
1982	(France) Jean-Claude Chemarin (Switzerland) Jacques Cornu	Kawasaki	(France) Hervé Guilleux (France) Jean Lafond	Kawasaki	(Netherlands) Johan van der Wal	Honda
1983	(Belgium) Richard Hubin (France) Hervé Moineau	Suzuki GS series	(France) Patrick Igoa (France) Jean Lafond	Kawasaki	(Switzerland) Jacques Cornu	Kawasaki
1984	(France) Gerard Coudray (France) Patrick Igoa	Honda RVF750	(France) Guy Bertin (France) Dominique Sarron	Honda	(Belgium) Patrick de Radigues (France) Jean-Pierre Oudin	Suzuki
1985	(France) Gerard Coudray (France) Patrick Igoa	Honda RVF750	(France) Jean-Pierre Oudin	Suzuki	(Belgium) Patrick de Radigues	Suzuki
1986	(France) Patrick Igoa	Honda RVF750	(France) Alex Vieira	Honda	(France) Gérard Coudray	Honda
1987	(France) Hervé Moineau (France) Bruno Le Bihan	Suzuki	(Belgium) Johan van Vaerenbergh	Kawasaki	(Belgium) Eric de Donker	Kawasaki
1988	(France) Hervé Moineau (France) Thierry Crine	Suzuki	(France) Alex Vieira (France) Christophe Bouheben	Honda	(France) Bruno le Bihan	Suzuki
1989	(France) Alex Vieira	Honda RVF750	(United Kingdom) Roger Burnett	Honda	(France) Jean-Michel Mattioli	Honda
1990	(France) Alex Vieira	Honda	(France) Jean-Michel Mattioli (Belgium) Stéphane Mertens	Honda	(Canada) Miguel Duhamel	Suzuki
1991	(France) Alex Vieira	Kawasaki ZXR-7	(France) Jean-Louis Battistini	Kawasaki	(France) Rachel Nicotte (France) Philippe Monneret	Yamaha
1992	(United Kingdom) Terry Rymer (United Kingdom) Carl Fogarty	Kawasaki ZXR-7	(France) Michel Graziano	Suzuki	(France) Jéhan d'Orgeix	Kawasaki
1993	(United States) Doug Toland	Kawasaki ZXR-7 & Honda RC30	(United Kingdom) Brian Morrison (France) Wilfried Veille	Kawasaki	(United Kingdom) Simon Buckmaster (United Kingdom) Steve Manley	Kawasaki
1994	(France) Adrien Morillas	Kawasaki ZXR-7	(France) Bruno Bonhuil (France) Philippe Monneret (France) Juan-Éric Gomez	Suzuki	(France) Jean-Louis Battistini	Kawasaki
1995	(Belgium) Stéphane Mertens (France) Jean-Michel Mattioli	Honda RC45	(United Kingdom) Terry Rymer	Kawasaki	(France) Bruno Bonhuil	Kawasaki
1996	(United Kingdom) Brian Morrison	Kawasaki ZX-7RR	(France) Alex Vieira (France) William Costes (France) Christian Lavieille	Honda	(Italy) Piergiorgio Bontempi	Kawasaki
1997	(Australia) Peter Goddard (United States) Doug Polen	Suzuki	(France) Juan-Éric Gomez	Suzuki	(France) Christian Lavieille (France) William Costes	Honda
1998	(United States) Doug Polen (France) Christian Lavieille	Honda RC45	(France) Bertrand Sebileau	Kawasaki	(France) William Costes	Honda
1999	(United Kingdom) Terry Rymer (France) Jéhan d'Orgeix	Suzuki	(France) Christian Lavieille	Suzuki	(France) Bruno Bonhuil	Suzuki
2000	(Sweden) Peter Lindén (Australia) Warwick Nowland	Suzuki	(Belgium) Stéphane Mertens	Suzuki	(France) Nicolas Dussauge (France) Christophe Guyot (France) Sébastien Scamato	Kawasaki

Year	Winning team	Points	Winning Bike	Winning riders	2nd	2nd riders	3rd	3rd riders
2001	(Belgium) WIM Motors Racing	182	(Japan) Honda RC51	(Belgium) Albert Aerts (Belgium) Laurent Naveau (Germany) Heinz Platacis	(France) Free Bike Performance	(France) Matthieu Lagrive (France) Eric Mizera (France) Bertrand Sebileau (France) Cyril Fernandez	(France) Honda Elf	(France) Fabien Foret (France) Sébastien Gimbert (France) William Costes (France) Sébastien Charpentier
2002	(China) Zongshen 2	123	(Japan) Suzuki GSX-R1000	(Australia) Warwick Nowland (Belgium) Stephane Mertens (Slovenia) Igor Jerman (Italy) Giovanni Bussei	(China) Zongshen 9	(France) Bruno Bonhuil (France) Pierrot Lerat Vanstaen (Slovenia) Igor Jerman	(France) GMT 94	(France) Sebastien Scarnato (France) Christophe Guyot (France) William Costes
2003	(United Kingdom) Suzuki GB - Phase One	143	(Japan) Suzuki GSX-R1000	(United Kingdom) James Ellison (United States) Jason Pridmore (United Kingdom) Andy Notman (United Kingdom) Dean Ellison (United States) Josh Hayes (France) Olivier Four (Sweden) Jimmy Lindstrom	(China) Zongshen 1	(Australia) Warwick Nowland (Belgium) Stéphane Mertens (Slovenia) Igor Jerman	(France) GMT 94	(France) Christophe Guyot (France) William Costes (France) Sébastien Gimbert (France) Sebastien Scarnato (Spain) David Checa
2004	(France) Yamaha - GMT 94	169	(Japan) Yamaha YZF-R1	(Spain) David Checa (France) William Costes (France) Sebastien Gimbert (France) Christophe Guyot	(France) Suzuki Castrol	(France) Olivier Four (France) Vincent Philippe (France) Matthieu Lagrive	(France) Endurance Moto 38	(France) Fréderic Jond (France) Gwen Giabbani (France) Stéphane Duterne
2005	(France) Suzuki Castrol	134	(Japan) Suzuki GSX-R1000	(Japan) Keiichi Kitagawa (France) Vincent Philippe (France) Matthieu Lagrive	(Switzerland) Bolliger Team	(Switzerland) Marcel Kellenberger (France) David Morillon	(Austria) Yamaha Austrian Racing Team	(France) Gwen Giabbani (Slovenia) Igor Jerman
2006	(France) Suzuki Castrol	185	(Japan) Suzuki GSX-R1000	(Japan) Keiichi Kitagawa (France) Matthieu Lagrive (France) Vincent Philippe	(Austria) Yamaha Austrian Racing Team	(France) Sébastien Scamato (France) Gwen Giabbani (Slovenia) Igor Jerman	(United Kingdom) Phase One	(Australia) Warwick Nowland (Australia) Damian Cudlin (Sweden) Christer Miinin
2007	(France) Suzuki Endurance Racing Team	165	(Japan) Suzuki GSX-R1000	(France) Matthieu Lagrive (France) Vincent Philippe (France) Julien Da Costa	Team Kawasaki France	(France) Gwen Giabbani (Spain) Julián Mazuecos (Australia) Steve Parker	(Austria) Yamaha Austrian Racing Team	(Slovenia) Igor Jerman (France) Sébastien Scamato (Australia) Damian Cudlin
2008	(France) Suzuki Endurance Racing Team	109	(Japan) Suzuki GSX-R1000	(France) Julien Da Costa (France) Vincent Philippe (France) Matthieu Lagrive (France) Guillaume Dietrich	(Austria) Yamaha Austrian Endurance Team	(Slovenia) Igor Jerman (United Kingdom) Steve Martin (United Kingdom) Steve Plater (France) Gwen Giabbani	(Spain) Folch Endurance	(Spain) Daniel Ribalta (Spain) Pedro Vallcaneras (Spain) Felipe López (Spain) David Tomás (Spain) José Rita
2009	YART-Yamaha Austria Racing Team	145	(Japan) Yamaha YZF-R1	(France) Gwen Giabbani (Slovenia) Igor Jerman (United Kingdom) Steve Martin	(France) Team 18 Sapeurs Pompiers	(France) Stéphane Molinier (France) David Briére (France) Jérome Tangre	(Switzerland) Bolliger Team	(Austria) Horst Saiger (Switzerland) Patric Muff (Germany) Rico Penzkofer (France) Éric Mizera
2010	(France) Suzuki Endurance Racing Team	133	(Japan) Suzuki GSX-R 1000	(France) Vincent Philippe (France) Freddy Foray (France) Sylvain Guintoli (France) Guillaume Dietrich (Japan) Daisaku Sakai	(Switzerland) Bolliger Team	(Austria) Horst Saiger (Switzerland) Roman Stamm (Switzerland) Patric Muff (France) Frederic Chabosseau	Yamaha Austria Endurance Team	(France) Gwen Giabbani (Slovenia) Igor Jerman (Australia) Steve Martin
2011	(France) Suzuki Endurance Racing Team	109	(Japan) Suzuki GSX-R 1000	(France) Vincent Philippe (France) Freddy Foray (Japan) Daisaku Sakai (France) Baptiste Guittet	(Belgium) BMW Motorad France	(France) Sébastien Gimbert (France) Erwan Nigon (Australia) Damian Cudlin (France) Hugo Marchand	(France) GMT 94	(France) Kenny Foray (France) Matthieu Lagrive (Spain) David Checa
2012	(France) Suzuki Endurance Racing Team	128	(Japan) Suzuki GSX-R 1000	(France) Anthony Delhalle (France) Vincent Philippe (France) Freddy Foray (Japan) Yukio Kagayama (Japan) Takuya Tsuda	(Belgium) BMW Motorad France	(France) Sébastien Gimbert (France) Erwan Nigon (Australia) Damian Cudlin	(France) GMT 94	(France) Kenny Foray (France) Mathieu Lagrive (France) Gwen Giabbani (Spain) David Checa
2013	(France) Suzuki Endurance Racing Team	93	(Japan) Suzuki GSX-R 1000	(France) Anthony Delhalle (France) Vincent Philippe (France) Julien Da Costa (Australia) Alexander Cudlin	(France) GMT 94	(Spain) David Checa (France) Kenny Foray (France) Matthieu Lagrive (France) Maxime Berger	(France) SRC Kawasaki	(France) Grégory Leblanc (France) Loris Baz (France) Jérémy Guarnoni (France) Nicolas Salchaud (France) Fabien Foret
2014	(France) Yamaha Racing - GMT 94 - Michelin	141	(Japan) Yamaha YZF-R1	(Spain) David Checa (France) Mathieu Gines (France) Kenny Foray	(France) Suzuki Endurance Racing Team	(France) Anthony Delhalle (France) Erwan Nigon (France) Vincent Philippe (Australia) Damian Cudlin	(Switzerland) Team Bolliger #8	(Austria) Horst Saiger (Switzerland) Daniel Sutter (Switzerland) Roman Stamm (Switzerland) Marc Wildesen
2015	(France) Suzuki Endurance Racing Team	154	(Japan) Suzuki GSX-R 1000	(France) Anthony Delhalle (France) Etienne Masson (France) Vincent Philippe	(France) GMT 94	(Spain) David Checa (France) Kenny Foray (France) Mathieu Gines	(France) SRC Kawasaki	(France) Grégory LeBlanc (France) Mathieu Lagrive (France) Fabien Foret
2016	(France) Suzuki Endurance Racing Team	88	(Japan) Suzuki GSX-R 1000	(France) Anthony Delhalle (France) Etienne Masson (France) Vincent Philippe	(France) GMT 94	(Spain) David Checa (Italy) Niccolo Canepa (France) Lucas Mahias	(France) April Moto Motors Event	(France) Grégory Fastré (France) Gregg Black (Australia) Alexander Cudlin
2016–17	(France) GMT94 Yamaha	146	(Japan) Yamaha YZF-R1	(Italy) Niccolò Canepa (Spain) David Checa (France) Mike Di Meglio (France) Lucas Mahias	(France) Suzuki Endurance Racing Team	(France) Anthony Delhalle (France) Vincent Philippe (France) Etienne Masson (Australia) Alexander Cudlin (Japan) Sodo Hamahara	Yamaha Austria Racing Team	(Australia) Broc Parkes (Spain) Iván Silva (Germany) Marvin Fritz (Japan) Kohta Nozane
2017–18	(Japan) F.C.C. TSR Honda France	171,5	(Japan) Honda CBR1000RR	(Australia) Joshua Hook (France) Alan Techer (France) Freddy Foray	(France) GMT 94	(Spain) David Checa (Italy) Niccolo Canepa (France) Mike Di Meglio	(United Kingdom) Honda Endurance Racing	(France) Julien Da Costa (France) Sébastien Gimbert (France) Erwan Nigon (Colombia) Yonny Hernández
2018–19	Team SRC Kawasaki France	145,5	(Japan) Kawasaki ZX-10R	(France) Jérémy Guarnoni (Spain) David Checa (France) Erwan Nigon (France) Randy de Puniet	(Japan) F.C.C TSR Honda	(France) Freddy Foray (Australia) Josh Hook (France) Mike Di Meglio	(France) Suzuki Endurance Racing Team	(France) Vincent Philippe (France) Etienne Masson (France) Gregg Black
2019–20	(France) Suzuki Endurance Racing Team	167,5	(Japan) Suzuki GSX-R 1000	(France) Etienne Masson (France) Gregg Black (Belgium) Xavier Siméon (France) Vincent Philippe	Yamaha Austria Racing Team	(Germany) Marvin Fritz (Italy) Niccolo Canepa (Australia) Broc Parkes (Czech Republic) Karel Hanika (France) Loris Baz	(Japan) F.C.C. TSR Honda	(France) Freddy Foray (Australia) Josh Hook (France) Mike Di Meglio
2021	(France) Yoshimura SERT Motul	175,5	(Japan) Suzuki GSX-R 1000R	(France) Sylvain Guintoli (France) Gregg Black (Belgium) Xavier Siméon	(Germany) BMW Motorrad World Endurance	(Ukraine) Illia Mykhalchyk (Germany) Markus Reiterberger (France) Kenny Foray (Spain) Javier Forés	(France) Webike SRC Kawasaki	(Spain) David Checa (France) Jérémy Guarnoni (France) Erwan Nigon
2022	(Japan) F.C.C. TSR Honda France	154	(Japan) Honda CBR1000RR-R	(Australia) Joshua Hook (France) Mike Di Meglio (United Kingdom) Gino Rea (France) Alan Techer	(Japan) (France) Yoshimura Suzuki Endurance Racing Team	(France) Gregg Black (Belgium) Xavier Siméon (France) Sylvain Guintoli (Japan) Kazuki Watanabe	(France) Viltais Racing Igol	(France) Erwan Nigon (Germany) Florian Alt (South Africa) Steven Odendaal
2023	(Austria) YART-YAMAHA	181	(Japan) Yamaha YZF-R1	(Italy) Niccolo Canepa (Germany) Marvin Fritz (Czech Republic) Karel Hanika	(Japan) (France) Yoshimura Suzuki Endurance Racing Team	(France) Gregg Black (France) Sylvain Guintoli (France) Étienne Masson	(Belgium) BMW Motorrad World Endurance Team	(Germany) Markus Reiterberger (Ukraine) Illia Mykhalchyk (France) Jérémy Guarnoni
2024	(France) Yoshimura SERT Motul	173	(Japan) Suzuki GSX-R 1000R	(France) Gregg Black (United Kingdom) Dan Linfoot (France) Etienne Masson	(Austria) YART-Yamaha	(Italy) Niccolo Canepa (Germany) Marvin Fritz (Czech Republic) Karel Hanika	(Belgium) BMW Motorrad World Endurance Team	(Germany) Markus Reiterberger (Ukraine) Illia Mykhalchyk (France) Sylvain Guintoli
2025	(Austria) YART-YAMAHA	138	(Japan) Yamaha YZF-R1	(Czech Republic) Karel Hanika (Germany) Marvin Fritz (Australia) Jason O'Halloran	(Japan) (France) Yoshimura Suzuki Endurance Racing Team	(France) Gregg Black (France) Étienne Masson (United Kingdom) Dan Linfoot	(Belgium) BMW Motorrad World Endurance Team	(Germany) Markus Reiterberger (France) Sylvain Guintoli (South Africa) Steven Odendaal
2026	(Belgium) BMW Motorrad World Endurance Team	158	(Germany) BMW S1000RR	(Germany) Markus Reiterberger (Netherlands) Michael van der Mark (South Africa) Steven Odendaal	(Japan) Yamaha YZF-R1	(Czech Republic) Karel Hanika (Germany) Marvin Fritz (Argentina) Leandro Mercado	(Japan) (France) Yoshimura Suzuki Endurance Racing Team	(France) Gregg Black (France) Étienne Masson (United Kingdom) Dan Linfoot

== Points systems ==
Points systems

Duration	1st	2nd	3rd	4th	5th	6th	7th	8th	9th	10th	11th	12th	13th	14th	15th	16th	17th	18th	19th	20th
24 Hrs	40	33	28	24	21	19	17	15	13	11	10	9	8	7	6	5	4	3	2	1
12 Hrs	35	29	25	21	18	16	14	13	12	11	10	9	8	7	6	5	4	3	2	1
Less than 8 Hrs	30	24	21	19	17	15	14	13	12	11	10	9	8	7	6	5	4	3	2	1

- For Manufacturers only the highest placed motorcycle will gain points, according to the position in the race.

Bonus Points	1st	2nd	3rd	4th	5th	6th	7th	8th	9th	10th
All Rounds	10	9	8	7	6	5	4	3	2	1

- For races with duration from 12 to 24 hours, the Top 10 teams after 8 hrs and 16 hrs receive bonus points.
- Manufacturers are not concerned by this rule and will not receive bonus points.

Starting Grid	1st	2nd	3rd	4th	5th
All Rounds	5	4	3	2	1

- On each race, Top 5 teams on starting grid receive bonus points.

== Latest race results ==
Race	Circuit	Date	Winner
24 Heures du Mans Moto	(France) Bugatti Circuit, Le Mans	20 April	YART - Yamaha #7: Marvin Fritz, Karel Hanika, Jason O'Halloran
8 Hours of Spa Motos	(Belgium) Circuit de Spa-Francorchamps	7 June	F.C.C. TSR Honda France #5: Taiga Hada, Corentin Perolari, Alan Techer
Suzuka 8 Hours	(Japan) Suzuka Circuit	3 August	Team HRC #30: Takumi Takahashi, Johann Zarco
Bol d'Or	(France) Circuit Paul Ricard	21 September	Yoshimura SERT Motul #1: Gregg Black, Dan Linfoot, Etienne Masson

List of FIM Endurance World Championship race winners since 2008
No	Date	Round	Circuit	Race	Winner
1/08	19-04-08	France	Le Mans	24 Hours Du Mans	SERT #2: William Costes, Barry Veneman, Guillaume Dietrich
2/08	10-05-08	Spain	Albacete	6 Hours of Albacete	SERT #1: Vincent Philippe, Matthieu Lagrive, Julien DaCosta
3/08	27-07-08	Japan	Suzuka	8 Hours Of Suzuka	Dream Honda Racing Team #11: Ryuichi Kiyonari, Carlos Checa
4/08	09-08-08	Germany	Oschersleben	8 Hours of Oschersleben	Kawasaki France #11: Julien Mazuecos, Ivan Silva, Erwan Nigon
5/08	13-09-08	France	Magny-Cours	24 Hours Bol d'Or	SERT #1: Vincent Philippe, Matthieu Lagrive, Julien DaCosta
6/08	08-11-08	Qatar	Losail	8 Hours of Doha	YART #7: Igor Jerman, Steve Martin, Steve Plater
1/09	18-04-09	France	Le Mans	24 Hours Du Mans	YART #7: Igor Jerman, Steve Martin, Gwen Giabbani
2/09	31-0-09	Germany	Oschersleben	8 Hours of Oschersleben	YART #7: Igor Jerman, Steve Martin, Gwen Giabbani
3/09	04-07-09	Spain	Albacete	8 Hours of Albacete	YART #7: Igor Jerman, Steve Martin, Gwen Giabbani
4/09	26-07-09	Japan	Suzuka	8 Hours Of Suzuka	Yoshimura Suzuki #12: D.Sakai, K. Tokudome, N. Aoki
5/09	13-09-09	France	Magny-Cours	24 Hours Bol d'Or	SERT #1: Vincent Philippe, Olivier Four, Freddy Foray
6/09	14-11-09	Qatar	Losail	8 Hours of Doha	YART #7: Igor Jerman, Steve Martin, Gwen Giabbani
1/10	18-04-10	France	Le Mans	24 Hours Du Mans	GSR Kawasaki #11: Julien Da Costa, Olivier Four, Grégory Leblanc
2/10	22-05-10	Spain	Albacete	8 Hours of Albacete	SERT #2: Vincent Philippe, Guillaume Dietrich, Freddy Foray
3/10	25-07-10	Japan	Suzuka	8 Hours Of Suzuka	MuSASHI RT HARC-PRO #634: Ryuichi Kiyonari, Takaaki Nakagami, Takumi Takahashi
4/10	12-09-10	France	Magny-Cours	24 Hours Bol d'Or	SERT #2: Vincent Philippe, Guillaume Dietrich, Freddy Foray
5/10	13-11-10	Qatar	Losail	8 Hours of Doha	SERT #2: Vincent Philippe, Guillaume Dietrich, Freddy Foray
1/11	16-04-11	France	Magny-Cours	24 Hours Bol d'Or	SERT #1: Vincent Philippe, Freddy Foray, Sakai Daisaku
2/11	21-05-11	Spain	Albacete	8 Hours of Albacete	BMW MOTORRAD FRANCE 99 #99: Sébastien Gimbert, Erwan Nigon, Hugo Marchand
3/11	31-07-11	Japan	Suzuka	8 Hours Of Suzuka	F.C.C. TSR HONDA #11: Kohsuke Akiyoshi, Shin'ichi Itoh, Ryuichi Kiyonari
4/11	24-04-11	France	Le Mans	24 Hours Du Mans	SRC Kawasaki #11: Julien Da Costa, Grégory Leblanc, Olivier Four
5/11	12-11-11	Qatar	Losail	8 Hours of Doha	YAMAHA FRANCE GMT 94 IPONE #94: David Checa, Kenny Foray, Matthieu Lagrive
1/12	14-04-12	France	Magny-Cours	24 Hours Bol d'Or	SRC Kawasaki #11: Julien Da Costa, Grégory Leblanc, Olivier Four
2/12	9-06-12	Qatar	Losail	8 Hours of Doha	BMW Motorrad France Team Thevent #99: Sébastien Gimbert, Damian Cudlin, Erwan Nigon
3/12	29-07-12	Japan	Suzuka	8 Hours Of Suzuka	F.C.C. TSR Honda #11: Jonathan Rea, Kosuke Akiyoshi, Tadayuki Okada
4/12	11-08-12	Germany	Oschersleben	8 Hours of Oschersleben	SERT #1: Vincent Phillippe, Anthony Delhalle, Yukio Kagayama
5/12	8-09-12	France	Le Mans	24 Hours Du Mans	Kawasaki SRC #11: Julien Da Costa, Gregory Leblanc, Freddy Foray
1/13	21-04-13	France	Magny-Cours	24 Hours Bol d'Or	SRC Kawasaki: Greg Leblanc, Loris Baz, Jeremy Guarnoni
2/13	28-07-13	Japan	Suzuka	8 Hours Of Suzuka	Musashi RT Harc-Pro: Takumi Takahashi, Leon Haslam, Michael van der Mark
3/13	17-08-13	Germany	Oschersleben	8 Hours of Oschersleben	SERT: Vincent Philippe, Anthony Delhalle, Julien da Costa
4/13	21-09-13	France	Le Mans	24 Hours Du Mans	SRC Kawasaki #11: Grégory Leblanc, Fabien Foret, Nicolas Salchaud
1/14	27-04-14	France	Magny-Cours	24 Hours Bol d'Or	SRC Kawasaki: Gregory Leblanc, Mathieu Lagrive, Nicolas Salchaud
2/14	27-07-14	Japan	Suzuka	8 Hours Of Suzuka	MuSASHi RT HARC-PRO: Takumi Takahashi, Leon Haslam, Michael van der Mark
3/14	16-08-14	Germany	Oschersleben	8 Hours of Oschersleben	Honda Endurance Racing: Julien Da Costa, Sebastien Gimbert, Freddy Foray
4/14	20-09-14	France	Le Mans	24 Hours Du Mans	SERT: Vincent Philippe, Anthony Dehalle, Erwan Nigon
1/15	19-04-15	France	Le Mans	24 Hours Du Mans	SERT: Vincent Philippe, Anthony Delahalle, Étienne Masson
2/15	26-07-15	Japan	Suzuka	8 Hours Of Suzuka	Yamaha Factory Racing Team: Katsuyuki Nakasuga, Pol Espargaró, Bradley Smith
3/15	22-08-15	Germany	Oschersleben	8 Hours of Oschersleben	GMT94 Yamaha: David Checa, Kenny Foray, Mathieu Gines
4/15	20-09-15	France	Paul Ricard	24 Hours Bol d'Or	Kawasaki SRC: Gregory Leblanc, Mathieu Lagrive, Fabien Foret
1/16	10-04-16	France	Le Mans	24 Hours Du Mans	Kawasaki SRC: Gregory Leblanc, Mathieu Lagrive, Fabien Foret
2/16	12-06-16	Portugal	Algarve	12 Hours of Portimão	GMT94 Yamaha: David Checa, Lucas Mathias, Niccolò Canepa
3/16	31-07-16	Japan	Suzuka	8 Hours Of Suzuka	Yamaha Factory Racing Team: Katsuyuki Nakasuga, Pol Espargaró, Alex Lowes
4/16	27-08-16	Germany	Oschersleben	8 Hours of Oschersleben	GMT94 Yamaha: David Checa, Lucas Mahias, Niccolò Canepa
1/16-17	20-09-16	France	Paul Ricard	24 Hours Bol d'Or	SERT: Vincent Philippe, Anthony Delahalle, Étienne Masson
2/16-17	16-04-17	France	Le Mans	24 Hours Du Mans	GMT94 Yamaha: David Checa, Niccolò Canepa, Mike di Meglio
3/16-17	20-05-17	Germany	Oschersleben	8 Hours of Oschersleben	GMT94 Yamaha: David Checa, Niccolò Canepa, Mike di Meglio
4/16-17	24-06-17	Slovakia	Slovakia Ring	8 Hours of Slovakia Ring	GMT94 Yamaha: David Checa, Niccolò Canepa, Mike di Meglio
5/16-17	30-07-17	Japan	Suzuka	8 Hours Of Suzuka	Yamaha Factory Racing Team: Katsuyuki Nakasuga, Alex Lowes, Michael van der Mark
1/17-18	17-09-17	France	Paul Ricard	24 Hours Bol d'Or	GMT94 Yamaha: David Checa, Niccolò Canepa, Mike di Meglio
2/17-18	22-04-18	France	Le Mans	24 Hours Du Mans	F.C.C. TSR Honda France: Josh Hook, Freddy Foray, Alan Techer
3/17-18	12-05-18	Slovakia	Slovakia Ring	8 Hours of Slovakia Ring	YART: Broc Parkes, Marvin Fritz, Max Neukirchner
4/17-18	09-06-18	Germany	Oschersleben	8 Hours of Oschersleben	F.C.C. TSR Honda France: Josh Hook, Freddy Foray, Alan Techer
5/17-18	29-07-18	Japan	Suzuka	8 Hours Of Suzuka	Yamaha Factory Racing Team: Katsuyuki Nakasuga, Alex Lowes, Michael van der Mark
1/18-19	16-09-18	France	Paul Ricard	24 Hours Bol d'Or	F.C.C. TSR Honda France: Josh Hook, Freddy Foray, Mike di Meglio
2/18-19	21-04-19	France	Le Mans	24 Hours Du Mans	Team SRC Kawasaki France #11: Jérémy Guarnoni, David Checa, Erwan Nigon
3/18-19	11-05-19	Slovakia	Slovakia Ring	8 Hours of Slovakia Ring	YART: Broc Parkes, Marvin Fritz, Niccolò Canepa
4/18-19	08-06-19	Germany	Oschersleben	8 Hours of Oschersleben	F.C.C. TSR Honda France: Josh Hook, Freddy Foray, Mike di Meglio
5/18-19	28-07-19	Japan	Suzuka	8 Hours Of Suzuka	Kawasaki Racing Team Suzuka 8H: Leon Haslam, Toprak Razgatlioglu, Jonathan Rea
1/19-20	22-09-19	France	Paul Ricard	24 Hours Bol d'Or	SERT: Vincent Philippe, Étienne Masson, Gregg Black
2/19-20	14-12-19	Malaysia	Sepang	8 Hours of Sepang	YART: Broc Parkes, Karel Hanika, Niccolò Canepa
3/19-20	30-08-20	France	Bugatti Circuit	24 Hours Moto	F.C.C. TSR Honda France: Joshua Hook, Freddy Foray, Mike Di Meglio
4/19-20	27-09-20	Portugal	Autodromo do Estoril	12 Hours of Estoril	YART: Marvin Fritz, Karel Hanika, Niccolò Canepa
1/21	13-06-21	France	Bugatti Circuit	24 Hours Moto	Yoshimura SERT Motul: Gregg Black, Xavier Simeon, Sylvain Guintoli
2/21	17-07-21	Portugal	Autódromo do Estoril	12 Horas do Estoril	F.C.C. TSR Honda France: Joshua Hook, Yuki Takahashi, Mike Di Meglio
3/21	19-09-21	France	Paul Ricard	24 Hours Bol d'Or	Yoshimura SERT Motul: Gregg Black, Xavier Simeon, Sylvain Guintoli
4/21	9-10-21	Czech Republic	Autodrom Most	6 Hours of Most	BMW Motorrad: Ilya Mykhalchyk, Markus Reiterberger, Kenny Foray
1/22	17-04-22	France	Bugatti Circuit	24 Hours Moto	Yoshimura SERT Motul #1: Gregg Black, Sylvain Guintoli, Xavier Simeon
2/22	05-06-22	Belgium	Spa-Francorchamps	24 Hours of Spa	BMW Motorrad #37: Jérémy Guarnoni, Illya Mykhalchyk, Markus Reiterberger
3/22	07-08-22	Japan	Suzuka	Suzuka 8 Hours	Team HRC #33: Iker Lecuona, Tetsuta Nagashima, Takumi Takahashi
4/22	18-09-22	France	Paul Ricard	Bol d'Or	Viltais Racing Igol #333: Florian Alt, Erwan Nigon, Steven Odendaal
1/23	16-04-23	France	Circuit Bugatti	24 Heures Moto	F.C.C. TSR Honda France #1: Mike di Meglio, Josh Hook, Alan Techer
2/23	18-06-23	Belgium	Spa-Francorchamps	24 Hours of Spa	YART Yamaha #7: Niccolò Canepa, Marvin Fritz, Karel Hanika
3/23	06-08-23	Japan	Suzuka	Suzuka 8 Hours	Team HRC #33: Tetsuta Nagashima, Takumi Takahashi, Xavi Vierge Zafra
4/23	17-09-23	France	Paul Ricard	Bol d'Or	Yoshimura SERT Motul #12: Gregg Black, Sylvain Guintoli, Etienne Masson
1/24	21-04-24	France	Circuit Bugatti	24 Heures Moto	Yoshimura SERT Motul #12: Gregg Black, Dan Linfoot, Etienne Masson
2/24	08-06-24	Belgium	Spa-Francorchamps	8 Hours of Spa Motos	YART Yamaha #1: Niccolò Canepa, Marvin Fritz, Karel Hanika
3/24	21-07-24	Japan	Suzuka	Suzuka 8 Hours	Team HRC #30: Teppei Nagoe, Takumi Takahashi, Johann Zarco
4/24	15-09-24	France	Paul Ricard	Bol d'Or	Yoshimura SERT Motul #12: Gregg Black, Dan Linfoot, Etienne Masson

== Classes and specifications ==
Motorcycles must be based on road going models with a valid FIM homologation

=== Formula EWC ===
Formula EWC for the FIM EWC Endurance World Championship. Black number plate background, white-light headlamps and minimum weight 175 kg. This is the top category and performance improvements during the race are possible. The overall appearance of the bike cannot deviate from the homologated model, but the fork, damper, swing-arm, brakes, radiator and exhaust can be modified. Teams are also given a relatively free hand to soup up engine performance. The chassis is equipped with a quick wheel change system.

Displacement

- 4 cylinders Over 600 cc up to 1000 cc 4-stroke
- 3 cylinders Over 750 cc up to 1000 cc 4-stroke
- 2 cylinders Over 850 cc up to 1200 cc 4-stroke

The displacement capacities must remain at the homologated size. Modifying the bore and stroke to reach class limits is not allowed.

=== Superstock ===
Superstock for the FIM World Endurance Cup. Red number plate background, yellow-light headlamps and minimum weight of 175 kg. For Superstock, the machines are practically identical to production bikes. The engine is as provided by the manufacturer, with very limited modifications permitted (injector jets and fuel mapping, clutch reinforcement, a different exhaust silencer, etc.). Wheels must remain as homologated, so teams need a good wheel change strategy at pit stops.

Displacement

- 3 cylinders and 4 cylinders Over 750 cc up to 1000 cc 4-stroke
- 2 cylinders Over 850 cc up to 1200 cc 4-stroke

The displacement capacities must remain at the homologated size. Modifying the bore and stroke to reach class limits is not allowed. In both Formula EWC and Superstock, the fuel tank is modified to a maximum capacity of 24 litres and fitted with a quick refuelling device.

=== Experimental ===
Green number plate background, yellow-light headlamps and minimum weight of 165 kg. The category includes motorcycles whose engine, main frame or suspension are completely different from the design of the original models. Machines in the Experimental category appear in the general classification of the event but are not classified in the World Endurance Championship. They are only admitted to the start after deliberation by the Race Selection Committee, which selects the machine for its technical and innovative interest. This category can also include electrical machines.

Displacement

- 4 cylinders Over 600 cc up to 1000 cc 4-stroke
- 3 cylinders Over 750 cc up to 1000 cc 4-stroke

=== Production World Trophy ===
Production World Trophy for the FIM EWC Endurance World Trophy. Blue number plate background, yellow-light headlamps and a minimum weight of 165 kg. This is the entry-level and most affordable category in the FIM Endurance World Championship. Production World Trophy motorcycles are similar to the production machines they are based on, sharing many original components including the fuel tank and electronics. Fuel tanks are replaced during pit stops using a rapid safety connector rather than the bike being re-filled. Fuel tanks are limited to a 16 litre capacity. Bikes in the class must follow a minimum pitstop time for safety reasons. Dunlop is the exclusive tyre supplier for the class.

Displacement

- 3 cylinders and 4 cylinders Up to 1000 cc 4-stroke
- 2 cylinders Up to 1200 cc 4-stroke
