= Sert =

Sert may refer to:

- Alternative spelling of Sart, modern Sardis, in Turkey
- Sert, Libya, a city
- Sêrt, Turkey
- A shortening of the name of the medication sertraline

== People with the surname ==
- Henri Paul Sert (1938–1964), Swedish artist
- Ivana Sert (born 1979), Serbian-Turkish actress
- Josep Lluís Sert, Catalan architect
- Josep Maria Sert, Catalan painter
- Misia Sert (1872–1950), Polish pianist
- Özgür Sert (born 2000), Turkish professional footballer

== See also ==
- SERT (disambiguation)
