= Anthony Delhalle =

French motorcycle racer (1982–2017)

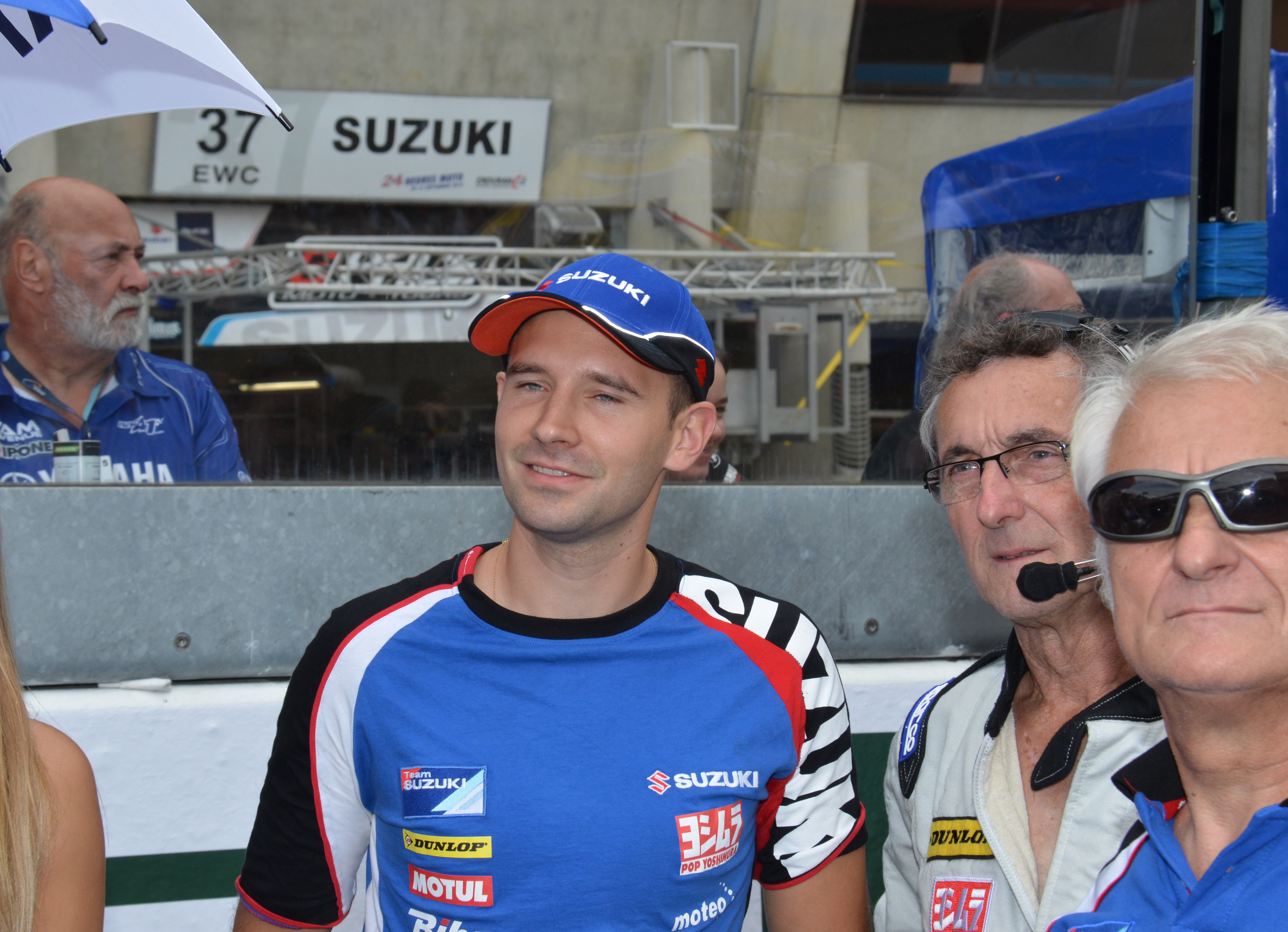
- Anthony Delhalle in 2014.
- Nationality: French
- Born: 11 January 1982; Chartres, France
- Died: 9 March 2017 (aged 35); Nogaro, France
- Website: anthonydelhalle.fr

Anthony Delhalle (11 January 1982 – 9 March 2017) was a French Grand Prix motorcycle racer. He rode a Suzuki GSX-R1000 in the FIM CEV Superbike European Championship and the Endurance FIM World Championship. He died on 9 March 2017, after falling from his bike during a test on the Circuit Paul Armagnac near Nogaro and breaking his neck.

== Career statistics ==
=== By season ===
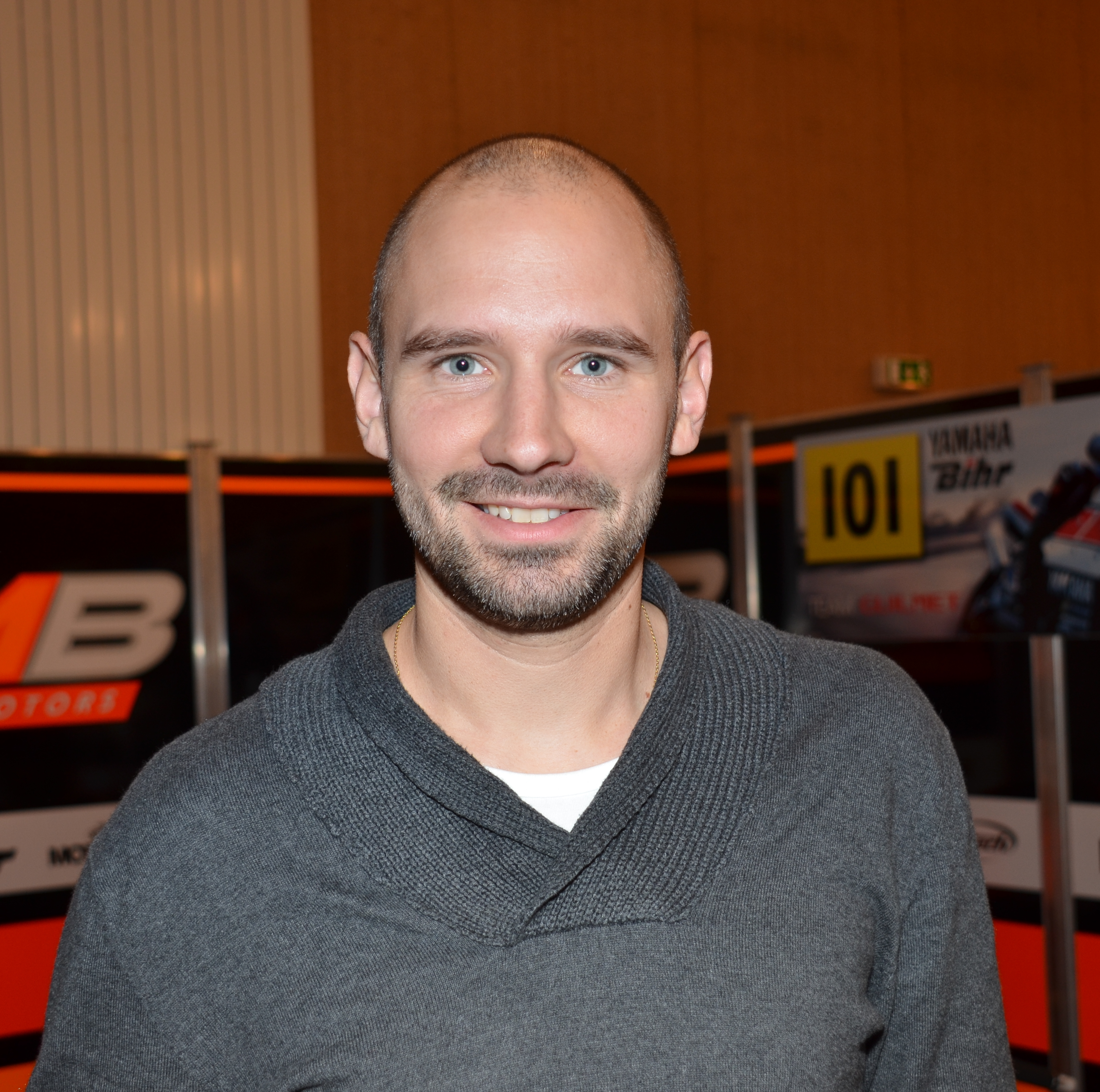
Anthony Delhalle in 2015

Season	Class	Motorcycle	Team	Number	Race	Win	Podium	Pole	FLap	Pts	Plcd
2010	Moto2	BQR-Moto2	Qatar Endurance Racing Team	96	3	0	0	0	0	0	NC
2010	Moto2	BQR-Moto2	Blusens-STX	96	3	0	0	0	0	0	NC
Total					3	0	0	0	0	0	

=== Races by year ===
Year	Class	Bike	1	2	3	4	5	6	7	8	9	10	11	12	13	14	15	16	17	Pos	Points
2010	Moto2	BQR-Moto2	QAT; 25	SPA	FRA	ITA; Ret	GBR; Ret	NED	CAT	GER	CZE	INP	RSM	ARA	JPN	MAL	AUS	POR	VAL	NC	0

=== FIM Endurance World Championship ===
==== By team ====
Year	Team	Bike	Rider	TC
2012	(France) Suzuki Endurance Racing Team	Suzuki GSX-R 1000	(France) Anthony Delhalle (France) Freddy Foray (France) Vincent Philippe (Japan) Yukio Kagayama (Japan) Takuya Tsuda	1st
2013	(France) Suzuki Endurance Racing Team	Suzuki GSX-R 1000	(France) Anthony Delhalle (France) Julien Da Costa (France) Vincent Philippe (Australia) Alexander Cudlin	1st
2014	(France) Suzuki Endurance Racing Team	Suzuki GSX-R 1000	(France) Anthony Delhalle (France) Erwan Nigon (France) Vincent Philippe (Australia) Damian Cudlin	2nd
2015	(France) Suzuki Endurance World Championship	Suzuki GSX-R1000	(France) Anthony Delhalle (France) Vincent Phillipe (France) Étienne Masson	1st
2016	(France) Suzuki Endurance World Championship	Suzuki GSX-R1000	(France) Anthony Delhalle (France) Vincent Phillipe (France) Étienne Masson	1st
2016–17	(France) Suzuki Endurance World Championship	Suzuki GSX-R1000	(France) Anthony Delhalle (France) Vincent Phillipe (France) Étienne Masson (Australia) Alexander Cudlin (Japan) Sodo Hamahara	2nd
