= Josh Hook =

Australian motorcycle racer

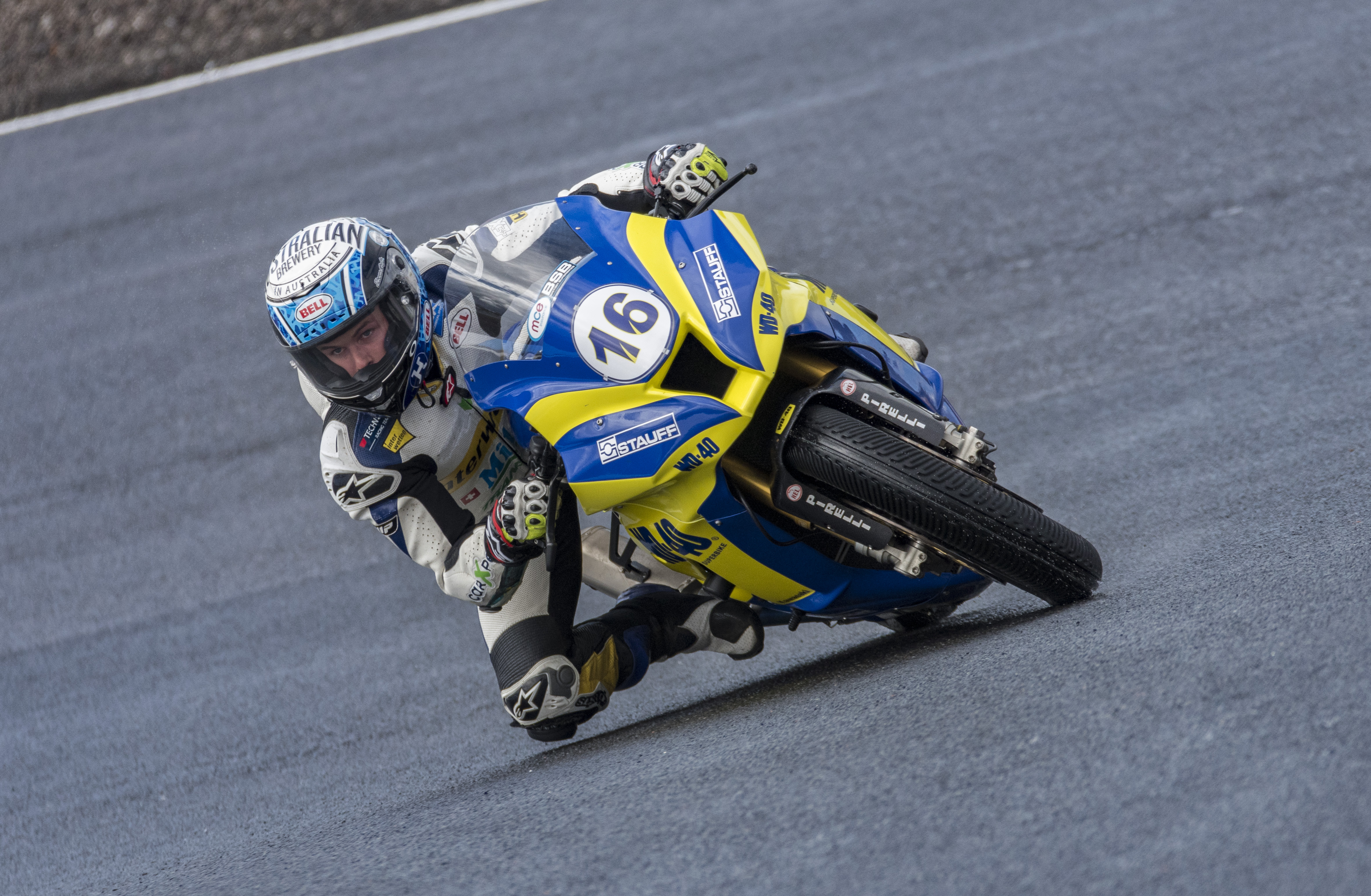
- Hook in 2016
- Nationality: Australian
- Born: 9 January 1993 (age 33); Taree, New South Wales, Australia
- Website: www.hookracing.com
Motorcycle racing career statistics
Moto2 World Championship
Active years	2015
Manufacturers	Kalex
Championships	0
2015 championship position	NC (0 pts)
Starts / Wins / Podiums / Poles / F. laps / Points; 4 / 0 / 0 / 0 / 0 / 0
125cc World Championship
Active years	2010–2011
Manufacturers	Aprilia
Championships	0
2011 championship position	NC (0 pts)
Starts / Wins / Podiums / Poles / F. laps / Points; 2 / 0 / 0 / 0 / 0 / 0
MotoE World Championship
Active years	2019–2020
Manufacturers	Energica
Championships	0
2020 championship position	8th (52 pts)
Starts / Wins / Podiums / Poles / F. laps / Points; 13 / 0 / 1 / 0 / 0 / 80
Superbike World Championship
Active years	2016
Manufacturers	Kawasaki
Championships	0
2016 championship position	31st (2 pts)
Starts / Wins / Podiums / Poles / F. laps / Points; 7 / 0 / 0 / 0 / 0 / 2
Supersport World Championship
Active years	2013
Manufacturers	Honda
Championships	0
2013 championship position	NC (0 pts)
Starts / Wins / Podiums / Poles / F. laps / Points; 1 / 0 / 0 / 0 / 0 / 0

Joshua Frederick Hook (born 9 January 1993) is an endurance world champion motorcycle racer from Australia. He currently competes in the FIM Endurance World Championship with F.C.C. TSR Honda France. He was the winner of 2011 Australia 125GP Championship on Aprilia.

== Career ==
=== Early career ===
Born in Taree, New South Wales, Hook started riding at the age of 14 months. He started dirt track riding in 2005, then moved to road racing in 2008, where he ranked third in the MRRDA series nationally. Hook was selected to compete in the Red Bull MotoGP Rookies Cup in Europe in 2009 and 2010, finishing the seasons 19th and 12th respectively. Hook showed his diversity by also ranking third nationally on a Honda CBR600, in the FX 600 Championship. In the 2012 season, he rode for Team Honda Australia in the Australia Supersport 600 category, finishing second. Hook also competed in the Petronas Asia Dream Cup throughout Asia, finishing third. His first season on a Superbike in 2013 saw him finish fifth in ASBK and fifth again in 2014 in ASC. He moved to the MFJ All Japan Road Race JSB1000 Championship for the 2015 season and finished 11th overall on his Honda CBR1000RR; he also finished second alongside Dominique Aegerter and Kyle Smith in the 2015 Suzuka 8 Hours endurance race. He also participated in Moto2 replacing an injured Aegerter for the last four races of the season, with a best result of 20th on home soil at Phillip Island.

=== Superbike World Championship ===
Hook joined the Grillini Racing Team for the 2016 season, partnering Dominic Schmitter in the Kawasaki Ninja ZX-10R-equipped team. However, Hook missed the start of the season due to a pre-season injury.

== Career statistics ==
=== Red Bull MotoGP Rookies Cup ===
==== Races by year ====
(key) (Races in bold indicate pole position, races in italics indicate fastest lap)

Year	1	2	3	4	5	6	7	8	9	10	Pos	Pts
2009	SPA1; 5	SPA2; Ret	ITA; Ret	NED; Ret	GER; DNS	GBR	CZE1; 16	CZE2; 16			19th	11
2010	SPA1; Ret	SPA2; 8	ITA; Ret	NED1; 16	NED2; 9	GER1; 6	GER2; 8	CZE1; 18	CZE2; 6	RSM; Ret	12th	43

=== Grand Prix motorcycle racing ===
==== By season ====
Season	Class	Motorcycle	Team	Race	Win	Podium	Pole	FLap	Pts	Plcd
2010	125cc	Aprilia	Hook Racing.com	1	0	0	0	0	0	NC
2011	125cc	Aprilia	Hook Racing.com	1	0	0	0	0	0	NC
2015	Moto2	Kalex	Technomag Racing Interwetten	4	0	0	0	0	0	NC
2019	MotoE	Energica	Octo Pramac MotoE	6	0	0	0	0	28	13th
2020	MotoE	Energica	Octo Pramac MotoE	7	0	1	0	0	52	8th
Total				**19**	**0**	**1**	**0**	**0**	**80**	

==== By class ====
Class	Seasons	1st GP	1st Pod	1st Win	Race	Win	Podiums	Pole	FLap	Pts	WChmp
125cc	2010–2011	2010 Australia			2	0	0	0	0	0	0
Moto2	2015	2015 Japan			4	0	0	0	0	0	0
MotoE	2019–present	2019 Germany	2020 France Race 2		13	0	1	0	0	80	0
Total	2010, 2011, 2015, 2019–Present				**19**	**0**	**1**	**0**	**0**	**80**	**0**

==== Races by year ====
(key) (Races in bold indicate pole position, races in italics indicate fastest lap)

Year	Class	Bike	1	2	3	4	5	6	7	8	9	10	11	12	13	14	15	16	17	18	Pos	Pts
2010	125cc	Aprilia	QAT	SPA	FRA	ITA	GBR	NED	CAT	GER	CZE	INP	RSM	ARA	JPN	MAL	AUS; 18	POR	VAL		NC	0
2011	125cc	Aprilia	QAT	SPA	POR	FRA	CAT	GBR	NED	ITA	GER	CZE	INP	RSM	ARA	JPN	AUS; 26	MAL	VAL		NC	0
2015	Moto2	Kalex	QAT	AME	ARG	SPA	FRA	ITA	CAT	NED	GER	INP	CZE	GBR	RSM	ARA	JPN; Ret	AUS; 20	MAL; 23	VAL; 26	NC	0
2019	MotoE	Energica	GER; 15	AUT; 7	RSM1; 10	RSM2; 12	VAL1; 8	VAL2; Ret													13th	28
2020	MotoE	Energica	SPA; 9	ANC; 8	RSM; 18	EMI1; 8	EMI2; Ret	FRA1; 4	FRA2; 3												8th	52

=== Supersport World Championship ===
==== Races by year ====
(key) (Races in bold indicate pole position, races in italics indicate fastest lap)

Year	Bike	1	2	3	4	5	6	7	8	9	10	11	12	13	Pos	Pts
2013	Honda	AUS; 17	SPA	NED	ITA	GBR	POR	ITA	RUS	GBR	GER	TUR	FRA	SPA	NC	0

=== Superbike World Championship ===
==== Races by year ====
(key) (Races in bold indicate pole position, races in italics indicate fastest lap)

Year	Bike	1		2		3		4		5		6		7		8		9		10		11		12		13		Pos	Pts
Year	Bike	R1	R2	R1	R2	R1	R2	R1	R2	R1	R2	R1	R2	R1	R2	R1	R2	R1	R2	R1	R2	R1	R2	R1	R2	R1	R2	Pos	Pts
2016	Kawasaki	AUS	AUS	THA	THA	SPA; Ret	SPA; Ret	NED; 16	NED; DNS	ITA; 17	ITA; Ret	MAL; 15	MAL; 15	GBR	GBR	ITA	ITA	USA	USA	GER	GER	FRA	FRA	SPA	SPA	QAT	QAT	31st	2

=== Suzuka 8 Hours results ===
Year	Team	Co-riders	Bike	Pos
2015	(Japan) F.C.C. TSR	(Switzerland) Dominique Aegerter (United Kingdom) Kyle Smith	Honda CBR1000RR	2nd
2017	(Japan) F.C.C. TSR	(Switzerland) Dominique Aegerter (France) Randy de Puniet	Honda CBR1000RR	3rd

=== British Superbike Championship ===
==== By year ====
(key) (Races in bold indicate pole position; races in italics indicate fastest lap)

Year	Make	1		2		3			4		5		6			7		8			9			10		11		12			Pos	Pts
Year	Make	R1	R2	R1	R2	R1	R2	R3	R1	R2	R1	R2	R1	R2	R3	R1	R2	R1	R2	R3	R1	R2	R3	R1	R2	R1	R2	R1	R2	R3	Pos	Pts
2016	Kawasaki	SIL	SIL	OUL	OUL	BHI	BHI		KNO; 18	KNO; 16	SNE; Ret	SNE; Ret	THR; 16	THR; 14		BHGP; 20	BHGP; 20	CAD; 20	CAD; 19		OUL; Ret	OUL; Ret	OUL; 18	DON; 14	DON; Ret	ASS; 19	ASS; 23	BHGP; Ret	BHGP; 19	BHGP; 18	26th	4

=== Australian Superbike Championship ===
==== Races by year ====
(key) (Races in bold indicate pole position; races in italics indicate fastest lap)

Year	Bike	1		2		3		4			5		6			7		Pos	Pts
Year	Bike	R1	R2	R1	R2	R1	R2	R1	R2	R3	R1	R2	R1	R2	R3	R1	R2	Pos	Pts
2022	Honda	PHI	PHI	QUE	QUE	WAK	WAK	HID	HID	HID	MOR	MOR	PHI	PHI	PHI	BEN; DNS	BEN; DNS	NC	0

=== FIM World Endurance Championship ===
==== By team ====
Year	Team	Bike	Rider	TC
2017–18	(Japan) F.C.C. TSR Honda France	Honda CBR1000RR	(France) Freddy Foray (United Kingdom) Josh Hook (France) Alan Techer	1st
2018–19	(Japan) F.C.C TSR Honda	Honda CBR1000RR	(United Kingdom) Josh Hook (France) Freddy Foray (France) Mike Di Meglio	2nd
2019–20	(Japan) F.C.C. TSR Honda	Honda CBR1000RR	(France) Freddy Foray (United Kingdom) Josh Hook (France) Mike Di Meglio	3rd
2022	(Japan) F.C.C. TSR Honda France	Honda CBR1000RR	(Australia) Josh Hook (France) Mike Di Meglio (United Kingdom) Gino Rea (France) Alan Techer	1st
