= Doug Polen =

American motorcycle racer

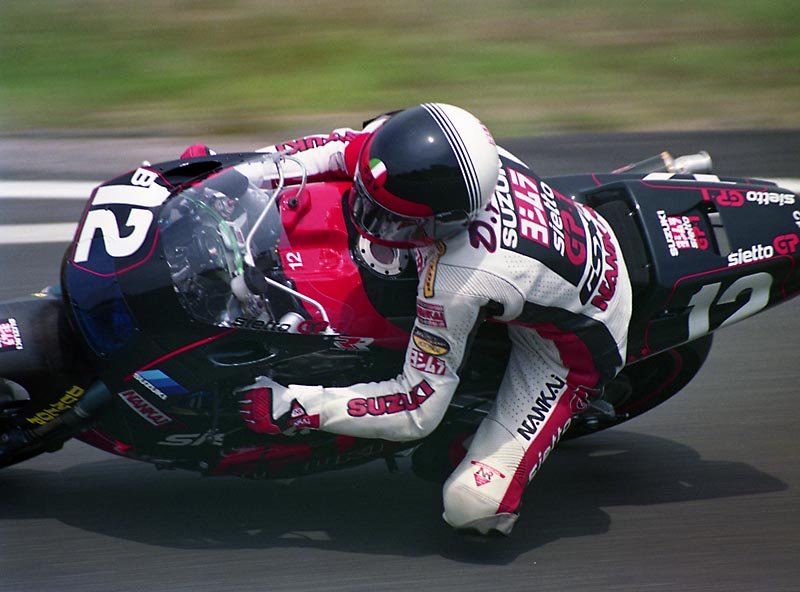
- Polen at Suzuka in 1990.
- Nationality: United States
- Born: 2 September 1960 (age 66)
Motorcycle racing career statistics
Superbike World Championship
Active years	1988 - 1992, 1994 - 1995
Manufacturers	Ducati, Honda
Championships	2 (1991, 1992)
1995 championship position	-
Starts / Wins / Podiums / Poles / F. laps / Points; 80 / 27 / 40 / 17 / 17 / 1002

Douglas Eugene Polen (born 2 September 1960) is an American former professional motorcycle road racer. Polen was a dominant national and world champion road racer in the late 1980s and early 1990s, culminating with his Superbike world championships in 1991 and 1992. He raced successfully in AMA Superbike, Japanese Superbike Championship, Superbike World Championship and endurance racing. Polen was inducted to the AMA Motorcycle Hall of Fame in 2011.

== Motorcycle racing career ==
Born in Detroit, Michigan, Polen's family moved to Denton, Texas, where he began his motorcycle road racing career in 1977 as a privateer racer. Injuries sustained in a crash in mid-1982 made Polen decide to quit racing but, friends convinced him to begin racing again in late 1985. In 1986, he competed in the newly created Suzuki GSXR National Cup Series. He was so successful at winning races that in only two years, he earned $260,000 in contingency fees while competing in the Suzuki sponsored series. He earned more money than any privateer rider in the history of American motorcycle racing. His success earned him a contract to race for the Yoshimura Suzuki racing team in 1988. With the Yoshimura team, he became the first competitor to win both the AMA 750cc Superbike and the 600cc Supersport titles.

In 1989, Polen had the opportunity to race for the Yoshimura team in Japan, winning the Formula 1 and Formula 3 in the All Japan Road Race Championship, the first time anyone had captured both titles the same season. While in Japan, Polen received a one-time offer to race in the Japanese round of the 1989 Superbike World Championship and, made an impressive debut by winning the first race and finishing the second race in fourth place. Polen joined Eraldo Ferracci's "Fast By Ferracci" Ducati racing team to compete in the 1991 Superbike World Championship. He won the championship in a dominating fashion, winning 17 of 24 races in the series and finishing 150 points ahead of his nearest rival, the defending world champion Raymond Roche. He also set a World Superbike Championship record by winning six consecutive pole positions, a record which stood for 18 years until it was broken by Ben Spies in 2009. Polen successfully defended his title by winning the 1992 Superbike World Championship. He also finished third overall in the 1992 AMA Superbike national championship.

In 1993, Polen left the world championship to compete exclusively in the United States and won the AMA Superbike national championship. In 1994. he joined the UK-based Castrol Honda team to race the then-new RC45 in the Superbike World Championship, insisting that the team use Dunlop tyres due to his close ties with the company. He left the team abruptly in early 1995 but not before teaming up with Aaron Slight to win the prestigious Suzuka 8 Hours endurance race for Honda. He teamed up with Peter Goddard to win the 1997 FIM Endurance World Championship before switching to a Honda to win the 1998 Endurance World Championship with Christian Lavieille.

Polen's total of 18 AMA pole positions was a record until Mat Mladin matched it in 2006. His 13 fastest laps in World Superbike competition in 1991 is a single-season championship record. After retiring from racing, Polen formed a road racing school to help motorcyclists improve their skills. In 2011, Polen was inducted into the Motorcycle Hall of Fame.

== Career statistics ==
=== Superbike World Championship ===
==== Races by year ====
Year	Make	1		2		3		4		5		6		7		8		9		10		11		12		13		Pos.	Pts
Year	Make	R1	R2	R1	R2	R1	R2	R1	R2	R1	R2	R1	R2	R1	R2	R1	R2	R1	R2	R1	R2	R1	R2	R1	R2	R1	R2	Pos.	Pts
1988	Suzuki	GBR; EX	GBR; EX	HUN	HUN	GER	GER	AUT	AUT	JPN	JPN	FRA	FRA	POR	POR	AUS	AUS	NZL	NZL									NC	0
1989	Suzuki	GBR	GBR	HUN	HUN	CAN	CAN	USA	USA	AUT	AUT	FRA	FRA	**JPN**; 1	**JPN**; 4	GER	GER	ITA	ITA	AUS	AUS	NZL	NZL					21st	33
1990	Suzuki	SPA	SPA	GBR	GBR	HUN	HUN	GER	GER	CAN	CAN	USA	USA	AUT	AUT	JPN; 8	JPN; DNS	FRA	FRA	ITA	ITA	MAL	MAL	AUS	AUS	NZL	NZL	48th	8
1991	Ducati	**GBR**; 1	**GBR**; Ret	**SPA**; 1	**SPA**; 1	CAN	CAN	USA; 1	USA; 1	**AUT**; 2	**AUT**; 1	**SMR**; 1	**SMR**; 1	**SWE**; 1	**SWE**; 1	**JPN**; 1	**JPN**; 1	**MAL**; 4	**MAL**; 5	**GER**; 1	**GER**; 2	FRA; 1	FRA; 1	**ITA**; 1	**ITA**; 2	**AUS**; 2	**AUS**; 1	1st	432
1992	Ducati	SPA; 2	SPA; 6	GBR; 6	GBR; 4	**GER**; 1	**GER**; 1	BEL; 5	BEL; 1	**SPA**; Ret	**SPA**; 1	AUT; 3	AUT; 5	ITA; 2	ITA; 3	MAL; 8	MAL; 1	**JPN**; 1	**JPN**; 1	**NED**; 1	**NED**; Ret	**ITA**; 10	**ITA**; 5	**AUS**; 2	**AUS**; 4	NZL; 1	NZL; 2	1st	371
1994	Honda	GBR; 9	GBR; 7	GER; 5	GER; 3	ITA; 12	ITA; 15	SPA; 6	SPA; 7	AUT; 3	AUT; 3	INA; 4	INA; 6	JPN; 10	JPN; 16	NED; 11	NED; Ret	SMR; 11	SMR; 7	EUR; 12	EUR; Ret	AUS; 11	AUS; 11					4th	158
1995	Honda	GER	GER	SMR; 17	SMR; Ret	GBR	GBR	ITA	ITA	SPA	SPA	AUT; Ret	AUT; Ret	USA	USA	EUR	EUR	JPN	JPN	NED	NED	INA	INA	AUS	AUS			NC	0

=== Grand Prix motorcycle racing ===
==== Races by year ====
(key) (Races in bold indicate pole position, races in italics indicate fastest lap)

Year	Class	Bike	1	2	3	4	5	6	7	8	9	10	11	12	13	14	15	Pos	Pts
1989	500cc	Suzuki	JPN; Ret	AUS	USA	SPA	NAT	GER	AUT	YUG	NED	BEL	FRA	GBR	SWE	CZE	BRA	NC	0

=== FIM Endurance World Championship ===
Year	Bike	Rider	TC
1997	Suzuki	(United States) Doug Polen (Australia) Peter Goddard	1st
1998	Honda RC45	(United States) Doug Polen (France) Christian Lavieille	1st

=== Suzuka 8 Hours results ===
Year	Team	Co-Rider	Bike	Pos
1994	(Japan) Team HRC	(New Zealand) Aaron Slight (United States) Doug Polen	Honda RVF750 RC45	1st

=== MotoAmerica SuperBike Championship ===
Year	Class	Team	1	2		3		4		5		6		7	8		9		10		11		Pos	Pts
Year	Class	Team	R1	R1	R2	R1	R2	R1	R2	R1	R2	R1	R2	R1	R1	R2	R1	R2	R1	R2	R1	R2	Pos	Pts
2009	SuperBike	Yamaha	DAY	FON	FON	RAT	RAT	BAR	BAR	INF	INF	RAM; 13	RAM; 19	LAG	OHI	OHI	HRT	HRT	VIR	VIR	NJE	NJE	33rd	10

Preceded by Raymond Roche	World Superbike Champion; 1991-1992	Succeeded by Scott Russell
Preceded by Scott Russell	AMA Superbike Champion; 1993	Succeeded by Troy Corser
Preceded by Brian Morrison	Endurance FIM World Champion; 1997; With: Peter Goddard	Succeeded by Doug Polen; Christian Lavieille
Preceded by Doug Polen; Peter Goddard	Endurance FIM World Champion; 1998; With: Christian Lavieille	Succeeded by Jéhan d'Orgeix; Terry Rymer
