= Slow strain rate testing =

Scientific test to study stress corrosion cracking

Slow strain rate testing (SSRT), also called constant extension rate tensile testing (CERT), is a popular test used by research scientists to study stress corrosion cracking. It involves a slow (compared to conventional tensile tests) dynamic strain applied at a constant extension rate in the environment of interest. These test results are compared to those for similar tests in a, known to be inert, environment. A 50-year history of the SSRT has recently been published by its creator. The test has also been standardized and two ASTM symposia devoted to it.

== Effect of strain rate ==
The important characteristic of these tests is that the strain rate is low, for example extension rates selected in the range from 10^{−8} to 10^{−3} s^{−1}. The selection of the strain rate is very important because the susceptibility to cracking may not be evident from result of tests at too low or too high strain rate. For numerous material-environment systems, strain rates in range 10^{−5} - 10^{−6} s^{−1} are used; however, the observed absence of cracking at a given strain rate should not be taken as a proof of immunity to cracking. There are known cases wherein the susceptibility to stress-corrosion cracking only became evident at strain rates as low as 10^{−8} or 10^{−9} s^{−1}. Nevertheless, the method is very suitable for mechanistic studies, as well as for relative ranking of susceptibility to cracking of different alloys, or the aggressiveness of environments and the effect of temperature, pH, metallurgical condition etc. The fastest strain rate that will still promote SCC for a given environment-material system is sometimes called the "critical strain rate", some values are given in the table:

Critical strain rates
Metal-environment system	Critical strain rate, s^{−1}
Aluminium alloys - aqueous chloride solutions	10^{−4} to 10^{−7}
Copper alloys - ammonia/nitrite solutions	10^{−6}
Titanium alloys - chloride solutions	10^{−5}
Steels - solutions of carbonates, hydroxides, or nitrates, or liquid ammonia	10^{−6}
Magnesium alloys - chromate/chloride solutions	10^{−5}
Stainless steel - chloride solutions	10^{−6}
Stainless steel - high temperature water solutions	10^{−7}

== The importance of other test parameters ==
Electrode potential and other environmental factors such as temperature, pH and degree of aeration can greatly impact the results off this accelerated stress corrosion cracking test, as can the specimen surface finish and metallurgical condition.

== The evaluation of the results ==
The evaluated parameters are:

- time to specimen failure (e.g., breakage, or from other "failure" criteria)
- ductility (by elongation to fracture or the reduction of the area)
- ultimate tensile strength (from the maximum load)
- area under the elongation - load curve (which represents the fracture energy)
- percent of ductile/brittle fracture on the fracture surface
- threshold stress for cracking

The results of the SSRT tests are evaluated using the ratio:

$\left[ \frac {\text{result from specimen in test environment}} {\text{result from specimen in inert environment}} \right]$

The departure of the ratio below unity quantifies the increased susceptibility to cracking. The test is best used in combination with electrochemical measurements and other stress corrosion cracking tests.
