= 1988 Donington Superbike World Championship round =

(United Kingdom) 1988 Donington Superbike World Championship round
Round details
- Round 1 of 9 rounds in the 1988 Superbike World Championship.
- Date: 3 April, 1988
- Location: Donington Park
- Course: Permanent racing facility 3.149 km (1.957 mi)

Superbike World Championship
Pole position
(United Kingdom) Roger Burnett
1:14.810
Fastest lap race 1	Fastest lap race 2
(Italy) Marco Lucchinelli	(United States) Bubba Shobert
1:14.140	1:14.100

The 1988 Donington Superbike World Championship round was the opening round of the 1988 Superbike World Championship season and the first ever in the series. It took place on 3 April 1988 at the Donington circuit in Great Britain.

== Report ==
The first grand prix in the history of the Superbike World Championship took place on April 3, 1988, on the 3.149 km National Circuit layout of Donington Park. 45 riders participated in qualifying, with pole position initially going to Doug Polen of the Yoshimura Suzuki team, but he, along with teammate Scott Gray, were disqualified (and deprived of the opportunity to participate in either race) because their bikes were found to have a cubic volume of 765 cm^{3}, against the imposed limit of 750 cm^{3}. This arose from the fact that the AMA Superbike regulations (the championship in which Polen and Gray raced) allowed this through "overboring" of the Suzuki's cylinders, while the World Superbike regulations were more rigid. With the exclusion of Polen from the starting grid, pole was inherited by Roger Burnett, who became the first rider to take pole position in a World Superbike race.

In the first race, 40 riders (the maximum allowed) lined up, but only 39 left the grid; rider Peter Häfner unable to take the start. The first race was won by Davide Tardozzi on a Bimota, despite having to manually restart the electronic injection system a few laps from the finish. The 1981 FIM 500cc World Champion Marco Lucchinelli finished second on the lone Ducati in the field, while Joey Dunlop finished third.

Only riders who made it to at least half distance in the first race were allowed to compete in the second, therefore only 31 riders were allowed to take the start, however only 30 did so. In the second race, Tardozzi and Lucchinelli once again fought for the top two positions, with the battle only being decided when Tardozzi crashed just after Starkey's Bridge on the final lap. Three-time AMA Superbike champion Fred Merkel would take second, and Burnett third.

Due to the points system being based on the combined results of the two races, Tardozzi's final lap crash would prevent him from scoring any points, despite his win in the first race. From the next round at Hungary onwards, half points would be awarded, but now for each race.

== Classification ==
=== Race 1 ===
Pos	No.	Rider	Bike	Laps	Time/Retired	Grid
1	2	(Italy) Davide Tardozzi	Bimota	30	37:50.720	2
2	39	(Italy) Marco Lucchinelli	Ducati	30	+1.090	3
3	3	(United Kingdom) Joey Dunlop	Honda	30	+30.050	5
4	17	(United States) Fred Merkel	Honda	30	+31.870	11
5	11	(United Kingdom) Roger Marshall	Suzuki	30	+35.830	6
6	8	(United Kingdom) Kenny Irons	Honda	30	+36.090	9
7	15	(Finland) Jari Suhonen	Yamaha	30	+42.670	27
8	10	(Italy) Fabrizio Pirovano	Yamaha	30	+51.670	13
9	18	(United Kingdom) Andy McGladdery	Suzuki	30	+1:00.940	18
10	36	(Canada) Michel Mercier	Suzuki	30	+1:01.790	15
11	24	(United Kingdom) Steve Williams	Bimota	30	+1:10.160	20
12	57	(Spain) José Maria Pardo	Yamaha	30	+1:11.360	24
13	35	(Canada) Rueben McMurter	Yamaha	30	+1:17.430	19
14	41	(Republic of Ireland) Mark Farmer	Suzuki	29	+1 lap	21
15	63	(United Kingdom) Dave Leach	Yamaha	29	+1 lap	25
16	37	(Canada) Tom Douglas	Yamaha	29	+1 lap	30
17	65	(United Kingdom) John Lofthouse	Suzuki	29	+1 lap	31
18	60	(Finland) Kimmo Kopra	Yamaha	29	+1 lap	28
19	56	(United Kingdom) Asa Moyce	Kawasaki	29	+1 lap	34
20	22	(Finland) Esko Kuparinen	Kawasaki	29	+1 lap	36
21	61	(United Kingdom) Steve Veasey	Kawasaki	29	+1 lap	35
22	64	(United Kingdom) Steve Mason	Suzuki	28	+2 laps	40
23	62	(United Kingdom) Dave Hill	Suzuki	27	+3 laps	37
24	19	(Australia) Graeme McGregor	Honda	25	+5 laps	32
25	7	(Sweden) Anders Andersson	Suzuki	24	+6 laps	17
Ret	6	(Belgium) Stéphane Mertens	Bimota	28	Retirement	4
Ret	34	(Canada) Gary Goodfellow	Suzuki	24	Accident	7
Ret	16	(United Kingdom) Keith Huewen	Bimota	24	Retirement	22
Ret	31	(United States) Bubba Shobert	Honda	20	Retirement	10
Ret	14	(Germany) Peter Rubatto	Bimota	17	Retirement	16
Ret	9	(United Kingdom) Roger Burnett	Honda	15	Accident	1
Ret	4	(United Kingdom) Mark Phillips	Bimota	14	Retirement	12
Ret	43	(United Kingdom) Michael Williams	Honda	13	Accident	39
Ret	42	(Austria) Hans Lindner	Honda	9	Retirement	14
Ret	30	(United Kingdom) Des Barry	Yamaha	9	Retirement	29
Ret	20	(United Kingdom) Robert Dunlop	Honda	9	Retirement	26
Ret	49	(Spain) Antonio García Moreno	Bimota	8	Retirement	33
Ret	23	(Germany) Michael Galinski	Bimota	4	Retirement	23
Ret	21	(United Kingdom) Paul Iddon	Bimota	2	Retirement	8
DNS	47	(Germany) Peter Häfner	Bimota	0	Did not start	38
DSQ	32	(United States) Doug Polen	Suzuki		Disqualified	
DSQ	66	(United States) Scott Gray	Suzuki		Disqualified	
DNQ	54	(Switzerland) Claudio Biesele	Bimota			
DNQ	52	(United Kingdom) Darren Dixon	Suzuki			
DNQ	1	(Italy) Virginio Ferrari	Honda			

=== Race 2 ===
Pos	No.	Rider	Bike	Laps	Time/Retired	Grid
1	39	(Italy) Marco Lucchinelli	Ducati	30	38:15.910	3
2	17	(United States) Fred Merkel	Honda	30	+9.350	10
3	9	(United Kingdom) Roger Burnett	Honda	30	+15.500	1
4	10	(Italy) Fabrizio Pirovano	Yamaha	30	+20.930	11
5	3	(United Kingdom) Joey Dunlop	Honda	30	+21.580	5
6	11	(United Kingdom) Roger Marshall	Suzuki	30	+23.890	6
7	18	(United Kingdom) Andy McGladdery	Suzuki	30	+46.610	15
8	8	(United Kingdom) Kenny Irons	Honda	30	+50.370	8
9	24	(United Kingdom) Steve Williams	Bimota	30	+53.780	17
10	15	(Finland) Jari Suhonen	Yamaha	30	+53.820	22
11	41	(Republic of Ireland) Mark Farmer	Suzuki	30	+1:16.270	18
12	7	(Sweden) Anders Andersson	Suzuki	30	+1:25.010	14
13	63	(United Kingdom) Dave Leach	Yamaha	29	+1 lap	21
14	65	(United Kingdom) John Lofthouse	Suzuki	29	+1 lap	25
15	37	(Canada) Tom Douglas	Yamaha	29	+1 lap	24
16	56	(United Kingdom) Asa Moyce	Kawasaki	29	+1 lap	27
17	22	(Finland) Esko Kuparinen	Kawasaki	29	+1 lap	29
18	61	(United Kingdom) Steve Veasey	Kawasaki	29	+1 lap	28
19	19	(Australia) Graeme McGregor	Honda	28	+2 laps	26
20	62	(United Kingdom) Dave Hill	Suzuki	27	+3 laps	30
Ret	2	(Italy) Davide Tardozzi	Bimota	29	Accident	2
Ret	35	(Canada) Rueben McMurter	Yamaha	29	Retirement	16
Ret	14	(Germany) Peter Rubatto	Bimota	21	Retirement	13
Ret	31	(United States) Bubba Shobert	Honda	19	Retirement	9
Ret	57	(Spain) José Maria Pardo	Yamaha	19	Accident	20
Ret	36	(Canada) Michel Mercier	Suzuki	11	Accident	12
Ret	16	(United Kingdom) Keith Huewen	Bimota	10	Retirement	19
Ret	6	(Belgium) Stéphane Mertens	Bimota	0	Accident	4
Ret	60	(Finland) Kimmo Kopra	Yamaha	0	Accident	23
Ret	64	(United Kingdom) Steve Mason	Suzuki	0	Accident	31
DNS	34	(Canada) Gary Goodfellow	Suzuki		Injured	7

=== Combined results ===
Only riders that finished both races were included.

Pos	No.	Rider	Bike	Laps	Time/Retired	Pts
1	39	(Italy) Marco Lucchinelli	Ducati	60	1:16:07.720	20
2	17	(United States) Fred Merkel	Honda	60	+40.130	17
3	3	(Northern Ireland) Joey Dunlop	Honda	60	+50.540	15
4	11	(United Kingdom) Roger Marshall	Suzuki	60	+58.630	13
5	10	(Italy) Fabrizio Pirovano	Yamaha	60	+1:11.510	11
6	8	(United Kingdom) Kenny Irons	Honda	60	+1:25.370	10
7	15	(Finland) Jari Suhonen	Yamaha	60	+1:35.400	9
8	18	(United Kingdom) Andy McGladdery	Suzuki	60	+1:46.460	8
9	24	(United Kingdom) Steve Williams	Bimota	60	+2:02.850	7
10	41	(Republic of Ireland) Mark Farmer	Suzuki	59	+1 lap	6
11	63	(United Kingdom) Dave Leach	Yamaha	58	+2 laps	5
12	37	(Canada) Tom Douglas	Yamaha	58	+2 laps	4
13	65	(United Kingdom) John Lofthouse	Suzuki	58	+2 laps	3
14	56	(United Kingdom) Asa Moyce	Kawasaki	58	+2 laps	2
15	22	(Finland) Esko Kuparinen	Kawasaki	58	+2 laps	1
16	61	(United Kingdom) Steve Veasey	Kawasaki	58	+2 laps	
17	62	(United Kingdom) Dave Hill	Suzuki	54	+6 laps	
18	7	(Sweden) Anders Andersson	Suzuki	54	+6 laps	
19	19	(Australia) Graeme McGregor	Honda	53	+7 laps	
