= 1989 Superbike World Championship =

1989 Superbike World Championship
Previous:	1988	Next:	1990

The 1989 Superbike World Championship was the second FIM Superbike World Championship season. The season started on 27 March at Donington Park and finished on 19 November at Manfeild Autocourse after 11 rounds.

American Fred Merkel won his second riders' championship and Honda won the manufacturers' championship.

== Race calendar and results ==
1989 Superbike World Championship Calendar
Round		Circuit	Date	Pole position	Fastest lap	Winning rider	Winning team	Report
1	R1	(United Kingdom) Donington	27 March	(France) Raymond Roche	(United Kingdom) Roger Burnett	(Italy) Fabrizio Pirovano	Belgarda Yamaha	Report
1	R2	(United Kingdom) Donington	27 March	(France) Raymond Roche	(France) Raymond Roche	(Italy) Giancarlo Falappa	Bimota SpA	Report
2	R1	(Hungary) Hungaroring	30 April	(United States) Fred Merkel	(France) Raymond Roche	(United States) Fred Merkel	Team Rumi RCM	Report
2	R2	(Hungary) Hungaroring	30 April	(United States) Fred Merkel	(United States) Fred Merkel	(United States) Fred Merkel	Team Rumi RCM	Report
3	R1	(Canada) Mosport	4 June	(United States) Fred Merkel	(France) Raymond Roche	(United States) Fred Merkel	Team Rumi RCM	Report
3	R2	(Canada) Mosport	4 June	(United States) Fred Merkel	(United States) Fred Merkel	(Italy) Giancarlo Falappa	Bimota SpA	Report
4	R1	(United States) Brainerd	11 June	(United States) Fred Merkel	Not recorded	(France) Raymond Roche	Squadra Corse Ducati Lucchinelli	Report
4	R2	(United States) Brainerd	11 June	(United States) Fred Merkel	Not recorded	(France) Raymond Roche	Squadra Corse Ducati Lucchinelli	Report
5	R1	(Austria) Österreichring	2 July	(France) Raymond Roche	(Italy) Baldassarre Monti	(Portugal) Alex Vieira	Honda Motul	Report
5	R2	(Austria) Österreichring	2 July	(France) Raymond Roche	(Belgium) Stéphane Mertens	(Belgium) Stéphane Mertens	Total Bel Ray	Report
6	R1	(France) Paul Ricard	30 July	(France) Raymond Roche	(United States) Mike Baldwin	(Belgium) Stéphane Mertens	Total Bel Ray	Report
6	R2	(France) Paul Ricard	30 July	(France) Raymond Roche	(Italy) Giancarlo Falappa	(Italy) Giancarlo Falappa	Bimota SpA	Report
7	R1	(Japan) Sugo	27 August	(United States) Doug Polen	(Australia) Michael Dowson	(United States) Doug Polen	Yoshimura Suzuki Sietto GP-1	Report
7	R2	(Japan) Sugo	27 August	(United States) Doug Polen	(Japan) Kenihiro Iwahashi	(Australia) Michael Dowson	Marlboro Yamaha Dealer Team	Report
8	R1	(West Germany) Hockenheim	17 September	(France) Raymond Roche	(France) Raymond Roche	(France) Raymond Roche	Squadra Corse Ducati Lucchinelli	Report
8	R2	(West Germany) Hockenheim	17 September	(France) Raymond Roche	(France) Raymond Roche	(France) Raymond Roche	Squadra Corse Ducati Lucchinelli	Report
9	R1	(Italy) Pergusa	24 September	(Italy) Giancarlo Falappa	(Belgium) Stéphane Mertens	(Belgium) Stéphane Mertens	Total Bel Ray	Report
9	R2	(Italy) Pergusa	24 September	(Italy) Giancarlo Falappa	(France) Raymond Roche	(France) Raymond Roche	Squadra Corse Ducati Lucchinelli	Report
10	R1	(Australia) Oran Park	12 November	(Australia) Michael Dowson	(Australia) Malcolm Campbell	(Australia) Peter Goddard	Marlboro Yamaha Dealer Team	Report
10	R2	(Australia) Oran Park	12 November	(Australia) Michael Dowson	(Italy) Fabrizio Pirovano	(Australia) Michael Dowson	Marlboro Yamaha Dealer Team	Report
11	R1	(New Zealand) Manfeild	19 November	(United States) Fred Merkel	(Australia) Michael Dowson	(United Kingdom) Terry Rymer	Team Loctite Yamaha	Report
11	R2	(New Zealand) Manfeild	19 November	(United States) Fred Merkel	(New Zealand) Aaron Slight	(Belgium) Stéphane Mertens	Total Bel Ray	Report

== Championship standings ==
=== Riders' standings ===
Rank	Rider	Manufacturer	Points	Wins
1	(United States) Fred Merkel	(Japan) Honda	272	3
2	(Belgium) Stéphane Mertens	(Japan) Honda	265	4
3	(France) Raymond Roche	(Italy) Ducati	222	5
4	(Italy) Fabrizio Pirovano	(Japan) Yamaha	208	1
5	(Sweden) Anders Andersson	(Japan) Yamaha	159	0
6	(Italy) Giancarlo Falappa	(Italy) Bimota	139	3
7	(United Kingdom) Terry Rymer	(Japan) Yamaha	134	1
8	(Italy) Baldassarre Monti	(Italy) Ducati	99	0
9	(Finland) Jari Suhonen	(Japan) Yamaha	90	0
10	(Australia) Michael Dowson	(Japan) Yamaha	79	2
11	(Australia) Rob Phillis	(Japan) Kawasaki	79	0
12	(United States) Mike Baldwin	(Italy) Bimota	74	0
13	(France) Patrick Igoa	(Japan) Kawasaki	64	0
14	(New Zealand) Aaron Slight	(Japan) Kawasaki	54	0
15	(Portugal) Alex Vieira	(Japan) Honda	51	1
16	(Australia) Malcolm Campbell	(Japan) Honda	48	0
17	(Italy) Davide Tardozzi	(Italy) Bimota	39	0
18	(Canada) Reuben McMurter	(Japan) Honda	38	0
19	(United Kingdom) Roger Burnett	(Japan) Honda	36	0
20	(Japan) Tadahiko Sohwa	(Japan) Kawasaki	36	0
21	(United States) Doug Polen	(Japan) Suzuki	33	1
22	(United Kingdom) Rob McElnea	(Japan) Yamaha	28	0
23	(West Germany) Ernst Gschwender	(Japan) Suzuki	28	0
24	(Japan) Kenihiro Iwahashi	(Japan) Honda	27	0
25	(Switzerland) Andreas Hofmann	(Japan) Honda	27	0
26	(Italy) Massimo Broccoli	(Italy) Ducati	26	0
27	(Denmark) Renè Rasmussen	(Japan) Suzuki	26	0
28	(Australia) Peter Goddard	(Japan) Yamaha	20	1
29	(Canada) Steve Crevier	(Japan) Yamaha	20	0
30	(Canada) Tommy Douglas	(Japan) Yamaha	20	0
31	(Japan) Tetsuro Arata	(Japan) Yamaha	18	0
32	(Germany) Peter Rubatto	(Italy) Bimota	17	0
33	(Italy) Fabio Biliotti	(Italy) Bimota	17	0
34	(United Kingdom) Brian Morrison	(Japan) Honda	17	0
35	(Canada) Gary Goodfellow	(Japan) Suzuki	16	0
36	(France) Jean Yves Mounier	(Japan) Yamaha	15	0
37	(Australia) Renè Bongers	(Japan) Yamaha	15	0
38	(France) Pierre Bolle	(Japan) Kawasaki	14	0
39	(United Kingdom) Paul Iddon	(Japan) Yamaha	14	0
40	(United Kingdom) Andy McGladdery	(Japan) Honda	14	0

=== Manufacturers' standings ===
Pos	Manufacturer	Pts
1	(Japan) Honda	368
2	(Japan) Yamaha	335
3	(Italy) Ducati	270
4	(Italy) Bimota	208
5	(Japan) Kawasaki	166
6	(Japan) Suzuki	120

== Notes ==
- The points allocation system was: 1st=20, 2nd=17, 3rd=15, 4th=13, 5th=11, 6th=10, 7th=9, 8th=8, 9th=7, 10th=6, 11th=5, 12th=4, 13th=3, 14th=2, 15th=1
