= Carl Fogarty =

English motorcycle racer (born 1965)

Carl Fogarty MBE
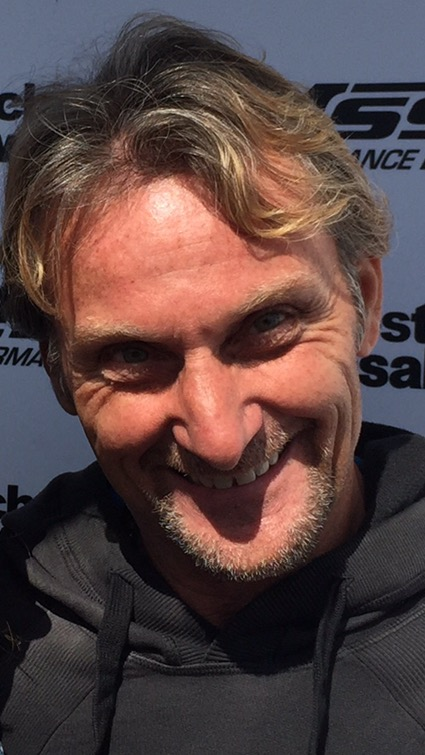
- Fogarty in April 2015 at Classics on the Quay
- Nationality: British
- Born: 1 July 1965 (age 61); Blackburn, Lancashire, England
- Website: www.carlfogarty.com
Motorcycle racing career statistics
MotoGP World Championship
| Active years | 1990–1993 |
| Manufacturers | Cagiva, Honda |
| Championships | 0 |
| 1993 championship position | 23rd (13 pts) |
Starts / Wins / Podiums / Poles / F. laps / Points; 8 / 0 / 0 / 0 / 0 / 37
Superbike World Championship
| Active years | 1988–2000 |
| Manufacturers | Ducati, Honda |
| Championships | 4 (1994, 1995, 1998, 1999) |
| 2000 championship position | 26th (36 pts) |
Starts / Wins / Podiums / Poles / F. laps / Points; 220 / 59 / 109 / 21 / 48 / 3020

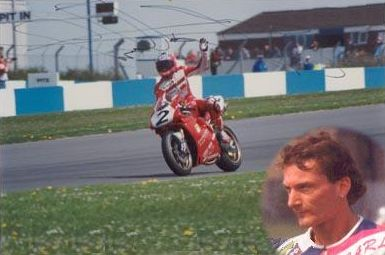

Carl George Fogarty (born 1 July 1965), often known as Foggy, is an English former motorcycle racer. With four World Superbike titles (1994, 1995, 1998 and 1999), he is one of the most successful superbike racers of all time. He also holds the fourth highest number of race wins at 59. He is the son of former motorcycle racer George Fogarty. In 2011, Fogarty was named a FIM Legend for his motorcycling achievements.

Known for his high corner speed riding style and aggressive competitiveness, Fogarty's greatest success came with the factory Ducati team. Fogarty helped to develop the Petronas FP1 racing motorcycle in the early 2000s after his retirement in 2000.

Fogarty won the 14th series of I'm a Celebrity...Get Me Out of Here! in 2014 and was crowned 'King of the Jungle'.

Fogarty was appointed Member of the Order of the British Empire (MBE) in the 1998 New Year Honours.

== Superbike World Championship ==
In 1991, Fogarty raced for Neil Tuxworth's Honda UK team in World Superbikes, finishing seventh overall. The team pulled out in 1992, and Fogarty nearly found himself without a ride after a promised deal failed to materialise. He did ultimately take his first WSBK win at Donington Park, and finished the championship ninth overall despite only completing a partial season.

The 1993 season was the beginning of his era as a factory Ducati rider. He battled with Scott Russell for the title, winning 11 races to the American's five, but losing out on consistency (Russell came second twelve times compared to Fogarty's two) to finish behind him.

In 1994, two factors came together to build on the successes of the previous season. Fogarty was fit and hungry for the title, having been so close the previous season; but he would also be using the new Ducati 916.

Fogarty missed the Hockenheim races with a broken wrist, but fought back to beat Russell and Aaron Slight to the crown.

Winning six of the first eight races in 1995 helped Fogarty seal that title with 5 of the 24 races to spare, and he clinched it with three races remaining in 1999.

In 1996, Fogarty raced for Tuxworth again, now with Honda factory support. Despite winning four races that season on the RC45, three more than team-mate Slight, and one more than Slight had managed over three seasons on the bike, Fogarty again struggled with consistency and finished fourth overall, 16 points behind second-placed Slight and 38 points behind champion Troy Corser.

In 1997, Fogarty returned to Ducati, finishing second overall to the Honda of John Kocinski.

The 1998 season was Fogarty's closest title – after a disappointing weekend at the Nürburgring he lay just sixth in the standings, but fought back to overhaul Corser and Slight in the final round. This was especially notable as his team (Ducati Performance), managed by Davide Tardozzi, was in its first year of WSBK competition.

Fogarty was forced to retire from racing in 2000 after a racing incident at Phillip Island when he hit privateer Ducati rider Robert Ulm and crashed. He suffered multiple injuries, including a serious shoulder injury which failed to heal well enough to allow him to race again. He was replaced in the factory Ducati team by Troy Bayliss.

Fogarty's first victory in any form of racing at Brands Hatch did not come until 1995. He had much greater success at Assen, winning all but one race there between 1995 and 1999.

== Other races ==
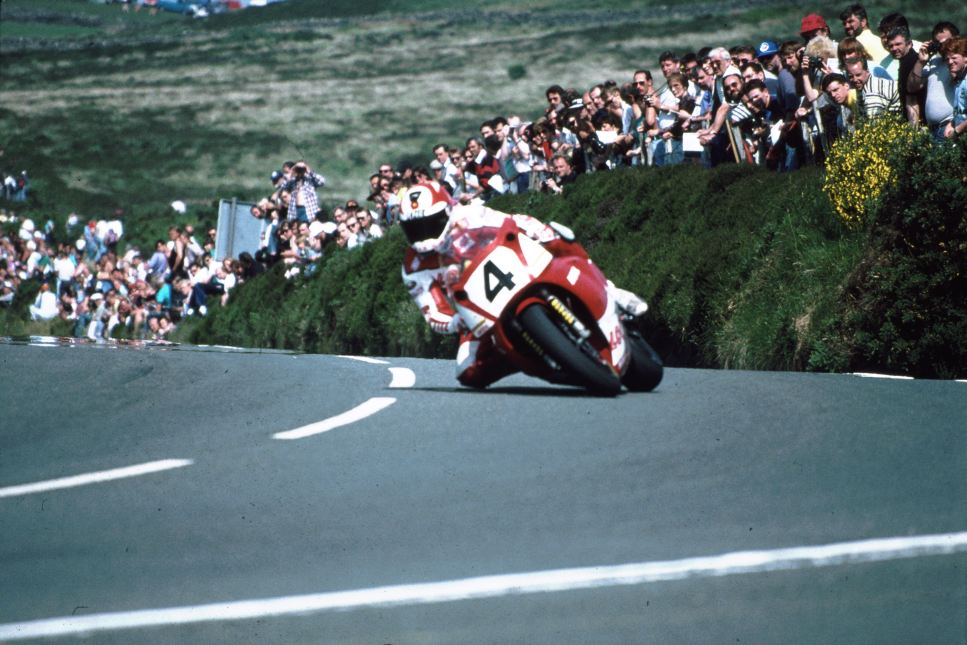
'Foggy' on his Yamaha at Creg-ny-Baa on the Isle of Man

Fogarty's Isle of Man achievements started in the mid-1980s. He won the 1985 Lightweight Newcomers event at the Manx Grand Prix and went on to win three TT races. First was the 1989 production 750 race, followed by the Formula 1 and Senior events in 1990. He made a total of 26 Isle of Man TT starts, breaking the lap record in 1992. His lap at 18 minutes, 18.8 seconds (123.61 mph) on a Yamaha 750 cc was not broken until seven years later by Jim Moodie from a standing start riding a Honda RC45 in 1999, taking the record to 124.45 mph.

Early in his career, Fogarty won the Formula One World Championship for bikes, which was gradually fading after the 1988 commencement of the World Superbike Championship. Fogarty won it three times, from 1988 to 1990. In 1990, it dropped below the six races required for the FIM to class it as a championship, rather than merely a cup; again, he won it.

Fogarty made several starts in Moto GP, filling in for Pierfrancesco Chili on an ROC bike for a while in 1990, with a best finish of sixth at the Swedish Grand Prix. He also contested the 500cc British Grand Prix several times. In 1992, he ran sixth before crashing on oil. In 1993, he qualified on the second row, and ran second early on after Alex Barros, Mick Doohan and Kevin Schwantz crashed on the first lap. He was set for third when he ran out of fuel, coasting over the line in fourth behind three Yamahas. He was entered again in 1994, but withdrew pre-race – citing a hand injury, but later admitting that he felt the ride was uncompetitive.

In 1992, Fogarty teamed with Terry Rymer and Michael Simul to win the 24 Hours of Le Mans. Other wins included Bol d'Or. They went on to win the FIM Endurance World Championship for Kawasaki. Thus, along with his four World Superbike Championships, he holds an aggregate of five world championship titles.

Riding for Ducati, Fogarty finished second at the 1995 Daytona 200 in the United States. Scott Russell crashed during the first lap of the race but was able to remount and pass Fogarty for the win. Fogarty said that the pace car regrouping following the yellow flag allowed Russell to close the gap significantly.

Fogarty won the Ulster Grand Prix F1 race in 1988, and then a year later he won the 'King of the Roads' senior race, setting a new lap record in the process, a speed of 121.629 mph.

In 1993, Fogarty won both superbike races at the North West 200 on board a Moto Cinelli Ducati 888. In race one, he beat the Dunlop brothers (Robert in second, Joey third), and in race two, he was again ahead of Robert (second) and Phillip McCallen in third. He also set a new lap record of 122.491 mph.

Fogarty rode a Harris Yamaha 500 GP bike in 1992 to victory in the Macau Grand Prix.

== Career stats ==
| Season | Series | Title | Pole | Race | Podium | Win | 2nd | 3rd | Full Laps | Pts |
|---|---|---|---|---|---|---|---|---|---|---|
| 1988–2000 | World Superbike | 4 | 21 | 220 | 109 | 59 | 33 | 17 | 48 | 3020 |

== Post-racing ==
In 2002, Ducati released a special limited-edition model (only 300 units were built) in his honour, the Monster S4 Fogarty.

In the same year, Fogarty founded the Foggy Petronas team in the World Superbike Championship (WSB). They entered with Carl's former team-mate Corser and James Haydon in 2003, but their three-cylinder Petronas FP1 was never truly competitive. In 2004, they achieved two third places (one for Corser and one for Chris Walker), but in this season, there was little manufacturer support in WSB. Once several manufacturers returned for 2005, they were not competitive. Petronas ended the project at the end of 2006, leaving Foggy's racing future unclear. Having tried and failed to find sponsorship for a team running customer Ducatis in 2007, in May Fogarty confirmed the team's return in 2008 as the official MV Agusta team – only to later pull the plug on his team's activities and put their assets up for sale.

Fogarty was never a person to stray away from controversy in the WSB paddock, and even in retirement, he frequently voices his opinion (most often in the British motorcycle newspaper MCN) in which he often berates past rivals such as Troy Corser and Neil Hodgson. This attitude towards other racers has made him a love-or-hate personality in the motorcycling world.

In 2014, Fogarty won the fourteenth series of ITV' I'm a Celebrity...Get Me Out of Here!. The final saw him challenged to eat a large cupful of live mealworms (which he managed in three mouthfuls), two fried tarantulas, three live cockroaches, ostrich anus and a camel's penis.

In July 2016, Fogarty was awarded an Honorary Fellowship from the University of Central Lancashire.

== Personal life ==
Fogarty married Michaela in 1991. They live in Mellor Blackburn Lancashire and have two children, including a daughter Claudia.

Fogarty backed the Conservative Party in the 2019 United Kingdom general election.

Fogarty has published two books: Foggy: The Explosive Autobiography (2001) and The World According To Foggy (2018).

== Charity work ==
Forgarty is a patron of local charity North West Blood Bikes - Lancs & Lakes and opened their new headquarters in December 2017.

== Career statistics ==
=== Grand Prix motorcycle racing ===
==== Races by year ====
(key) (Races in bold indicate pole position) (Races in italics indicate fastest lap)

| Year | Class | Bike | 1 | 2 | 3 | 4 | 5 | 6 | 7 | 8 | 9 | 10 | 11 | 12 | 13 | 14 | 15 | Pos | Pts |
|---|---|---|---|---|---|---|---|---|---|---|---|---|---|---|---|---|---|---|---|
| 1986 | 250cc | Yamaha | ESP | NAT | GER | AUT | YUG | NED | BEL | FRA | GBR; 11 | SWE | SMR | | | | | NC | 0 |
| 1990 | 500cc | Honda | JPN | USA | ESP | NAT | GER | AUT | YUG | NED | BEL | FRA | GBR; Ret | SWE; 6 | CZE; 10 | HUN; 8 | AUS | 18th | 24 |
| 1992 | 500cc | Harris-Yamaha | JPN | AUS | MAL | ESP | ITA | EUR | GER | NED | HUN | FRA | GBR; Ret | BRA | RSA | | | NC | 0 |
| 1993 | 500cc | Cagiva | AUS | MAL | JPN | ESP | AUT | GER | NED | EUR | RSM | GBR; 4 | CZE | ITA | USA | FIM | | 23rd | 13 |

=== Superbike World Championship ===
==== Races by year ====
(key) (Races in bold indicate pole position) (Races in italics indicate fastest lap)

| Year | Bike | 1 | | 2 | | 3 | | 4 | | 5 | | 6 | | 7 | | 8 | | 9 | | 10 | | 11 | | 12 | | 13 | | Pos | Pts |
| Year | Bike | R1 | R2 | R1 | R2 | R1 | R2 | R1 | R2 | R1 | R2 | R1 | R2 | R1 | R2 | R1 | R2 | R1 | R2 | R1 | R2 | R1 | R2 | R1 | R2 | R1 | R2 | Pos | Pts |
|---|---|---|---|---|---|---|---|---|---|---|---|---|---|---|---|---|---|---|---|---|---|---|---|---|---|---|---|---|---|
| 1988 | Honda | GBR; Ret | GBR; DNS | HUN | HUN | GER | GER | AUT | AUT | JPN | JPN | FRA | FRA | POR | POR | AUS | AUS | NZL | NZL | | | | | | | | | NC | 0 |
| 1989 | Honda | GBR; 7 | GBR; 13 | HUN | HUN | CAN | CAN | USA | USA | AUT | AUT | FRA | FRA | JPN | JPN | GER | GER | ITA | ITA | AUS | AUS | NZL | NZL | | | | | 44th | 12 |
| 1990 | Honda | ESP; 14 | ESP; Ret | GBR; 6 | GBR; 6 | HUN | HUN | GER | GER | CAN | CAN | USA | USA | AUT | AUT | JPN | JPN | FRA; Ret | FRA; 8 | ITA | ITA | MAS | MAS | AUS | AUS | NZL | NZL | 19th | 30 |
| 1991 | Honda | GBR; Ret | GBR; 9 | ESP; 9 | ESP; 8 | CAN | CAN | USA; 11 | USA; 11 | AUT | AUT | SMR; 7 | SMR; 8 | SWE; 4 | SWE; 4 | JPN; 11 | JPN; 8 | MAS; 8 | MAS; 7 | GER; 9 | GER; 10 | FRA; 6 | FRA; 7 | ITA; 7 | ITA; Ret | AUS | AUS | 7th | 146 |
| 1992 | Ducati | ESP; 12 | ESP; 10 | **GBR**; Ret | **GBR**; 1 | GER; 20 | GER; 11 | BEL; Ret | BEL; 8 | ESP; 5 | ESP; Ret | AUT; 6 | AUT; 7 | ITA; 7 | ITA; 4 | MAS | MAS | JPN | JPN | NED; 4 | NED; 2 | ITA; Ret | ITA; Ret | AUS; 7 | AUS; Ret | NZL | NZL | 9th | 134 |
| 1993 | Ducati | GBR; Ret | GBR | GER; 3 | GER; 7 | ESP; 1 | ESP; 1 | SMR; 5 | SMR; 3 | AUT; 4 | AUT; 4 | **CZE**; 1 | **CZE**; 2 | **SWE**; 1 | **SWE**; 1 | **MAS**; 1 | **MAS**; 1 | **JPN**; 1 | **JPN**; 24 | **NED**; 1 | **NED**; 1 | ITA; 4 | ITA; 4 | **GBR**; 2 | **GBR**; Ret | POR; Ret | POR; 1 | **2nd** | **349.5** |
| 1994 | Ducati | GBR; 1 | GBR; 2 | GER | GER | SMR; Ret | SMR; 5 | **ESP**; 1 | **ESP**; 1 | **AUT**; 1 | **AUT**; 1 | **INA**; Ret | **INA**; 1 | JPN; 4 | JPN; 2 | **NED**; 1 | **NED**; 1 | **ITA**; 2 | **ITA**; 1 | **GBR**; 14 | **GBR**; 5 | AUS; 1 | AUS; 2 | | | | | **1st** | **305** |
| 1995 | Ducati | GER; 1 | GER; 1 | **SMR**; 2 | **SMR**; 2 | **GBR**; 1 | **GBR**; 1 | ITA; 1 | ITA; 2 | ESP; 2 | ESP; 1 | AUT; 1 | AUT; 2 | USA; 5 | USA; 7 | **GBR**; 1 | **GBR**; 1 | **JPN**; Ret | **JPN**; 1 | NED; 1 | NED; 1 | INA; 1 | INA; Ret | AUS; 4 | AUS; 2 | | | **1st** | **478** |
| 1996 | Honda | SMR; 7 | SMR; 6 | GBR; 8 | GBR; 7 | GER; 5 | GER; 1 | ITA; 1 | ITA; 3 | CZE; 2 | CZE; 3 | USA; 8 | USA; 4 | GBR; 5 | GBR; Ret | INA; 2 | INA; 3 | JPN; 8 | JPN; 4 | NED; 1 | NED; 1 | ESP; 5 | ESP; 7 | AUS; 4 | AUS; 6 | | | 4th | 331 |
| 1997 | Ducati | AUS; 2 | AUS; 4 | SMR; 3 | SMR; 3 | GBR; 2 | GBR; 1 | GER; 4 | GER; 1 | ITA; 3 | ITA; 4 | USA; 2 | USA; 2 | GBR; Ret | GBR; 1 | AUT; 1 | AUT; Ret | NED; 2 | NED; 1 | ESP; Ret | ESP; Ret | JPN; 13 | JPN; Ret | INA; 3 | INA; 1 | | | **2nd** | **358** |
| 1998 | Ducati | AUS; 1 | AUS; 3 | GBR; 7 | GBR; 3 | ITA; 6 | ITA; 2 | ESP; 9 | ESP; 1 | GER; 13 | GER; 13 | SMR; 4 | SMR; 3 | RSA; 2 | RSA; 2 | USA; 5 | USA; Ret | GBR; 4 | GBR; 2 | AUT; 3 | AUT; 2 | NED; 2 | NED; 1 | JPN; 3 | JPN; 4 | | | **1st** | **351.5** |
| 1999 | Ducati | RSA; 1 | RSA; 1 | AUS; 2 | AUS; 2 | GBR; 1 | GBR; 2 | **ESP**; 3 | **ESP**; 3 | ITA; 1 | ITA; 1 | **GER**; 1 | **GER**; 15 | **SMR**; 1 | **SMR**; 1 | USA; 5 | USA; 4 | **GBR**; 19 | **GBR**; 4 | AUT; 2 | AUT; 4 | NED; 1 | NED; 1 | GER; 1 | GER; 2 | JPN; 2 | JPN; 5 | **1st** | **489** |
| 2000 | Ducati | RSA; 3 | RSA; Ret | AUS; 2 | AUS; Ret | JPN | JPN | GBR | GBR | ITA | ITA | GER | GER | SMR | SMR | ESP | ESP | USA | USA | GBR | GBR | NED | NED | GER | GER | GBR | GBR | 26th | 36 |

=== FIM Endurance World Championship ===
| Year | Bike | Rider | TC |
|---|---|---|---|
| 1992 | Kawasaki ZXR-7 | (United Kingdom) Terry Rymer (United Kingdom) Carl Fogarty | 1st |

== Bibliography ==
- Fogarty, Carl; Bramwell, Neil (7 August 2000). Foggy: The Explosive Autobiography. Collins Willow. ISBN 978-0002189613.
- Fogarty, Carl (21 May 2001). Foggy on Bikes: Learn to Ride Like a World Champion. Collins Willow. ISBN 978-0007115167.
- Fogarty, Carl (3 May 2004). Foggy: The Championship Years. HarperCollins. ISBN 978-0007175390.
- Fogarty, Carl (19 April 2018). The World According to Foggy. Headline Publishing Group. ISBN 978-1472255242.

Sporting positions
| Preceded by Virginio Ferrari | TT Formula One World Champion; 1988–1990 | Succeeded by None |
| Preceded by Didier de Radiguès | Macau Motorcycle Grand Prix Winner; 1992 | Succeeded by Steve Hislop |
| Preceded by Scott Russell | World Superbike Champion; 1994–1995 | Succeeded by Troy Corser |
| Preceded by John Kocinski | World Superbike Champion; 1998–1999 | Succeeded by Colin Edwards |

| Preceded by Kian Egan | I'm a Celebrity... Get Me Out of Here! Winner & King of the Jungle; 2014 | Succeeded by Vicky Pattison |
