= 1991 Superbike World Championship =

Sports event

1991 Superbike World Championship
Previous:	1990	Next:	1992

The 1991 Superbike World Championship was the fourth FIM Superbike World Championship season. The season started on 1 April at Donington Park and finished on 19 October at Phillip Island after 13 rounds.

Doug Polen won the riders' championship with 17 victories and Ducati won the manufacturers' championship.

The third round of the championship at Mosport was boycotted by the regular riders on safety grounds.

1991 Superbike World Championship Calendar
Round		Circuit	Date	Pole position	Fastest lap	Winning rider	Winning team
1	R1	(United Kingdom) Donington	1 April	(United States) Doug Polen	(Belgium) Stéphane Mertens	(United States) Doug Polen	Team Fast by Ferracci
1	R2	(United Kingdom) Donington	1 April	(United States) Doug Polen	(United States) Doug Polen	(Belgium) Stéphane Mertens	Total Wanty Mertens Racing
2	R1	(Spain) Jarama	28 April	(United States) Doug Polen	(United States) Doug Polen	(United States) Doug Polen	Team Fast by Ferracci
2	R2	(Spain) Jarama	28 April	(United States) Doug Polen	(United States) Doug Polen	(United States) Doug Polen	Team Fast by Ferracci
3	R1	(Canada) Mosport	2 June	(United States) Tom Kipp	(Canada) Pascal Picotte	(Canada) Pascal Picotte	Fast Yamaha/Sunoco
3	R2	(Canada) Mosport	2 June	(United States) Tom Kipp	(Canada) Rueben McMurter	(United States) Tom Kipp	Wiseco Piston
4	R1	(United States) Brainerd	9 June	(Belgium) Stéphane Mertens	(United States) Doug Polen	(United States) Doug Polen	Team Fast by Ferracci
4	R2	(United States) Brainerd	9 June	(Belgium) Stéphane Mertens	(Belgium) Stéphane Mertens	(United States) Doug Polen	Team Fast by Ferracci
5	R1	(Austria) Österreichring	30 June	(United States) Doug Polen	(United States) Doug Polen	(Belgium) Stéphane Mertens	Total Wanty Mertens Racing
5	R2	(Austria) Österreichring	30 June	(United States) Doug Polen	(United States) Doug Polen	(United States) Doug Polen	Team Fast by Ferracci
6	R1	(San Marino) Misano	4 August	(United States) Doug Polen	(Australia) Rob Phillis	(United States) Doug Polen	Team Fast by Ferracci
6	R2	(San Marino) Misano	4 August	(United States) Doug Polen	(France) Raymond Roche	(United States) Doug Polen	Team Fast by Ferracci
7	R1	(Sweden) Anderstorp	11 August	(United States) Doug Polen	(Belgium) Stéphane Mertens	(United States) Doug Polen	Team Fast by Ferracci
7	R2	(Sweden) Anderstorp	11 August	(United States) Doug Polen	(France) Raymond Roche	(United States) Doug Polen	Team Fast by Ferracci
8	R1	(Japan) Sugo	25 August	(United States) Doug Polen	(United States) Doug Polen	(United States) Doug Polen	Team Fast by Ferracci
8	R2	(Japan) Sugo	25 August	(United States) Doug Polen	(United States) Doug Polen	(United States) Doug Polen	Team Fast by Ferracci
9	R1	(Malaysia) Shah Alam	1 September	(United States) Doug Polen	(United States) Doug Polen	(France) Raymond Roche	Squadra Corse Ducati Lucchinelli
9	R2	(Malaysia) Shah Alam	1 September	(United States) Doug Polen	(France) Raymond Roche	(France) Raymond Roche	Squadra Corse Ducati Lucchinelli
10	R1	(Germany) Hockenheim	15 September	(United States) Doug Polen	(France) Raymond Roche	(United States) Doug Polen	Team Fast by Ferracci
10	R2	(Germany) Hockenheim	15 September	(United States) Doug Polen	(United States) Doug Polen	(France) Raymond Roche	Squadra Corse Ducati Lucchinelli
11	R1	(France) Magny-Cours	29 September	(Australia) Rob Phillis	(United States) Doug Polen	(United States) Doug Polen	Team Fast by Ferracci
11	R2	(France) Magny-Cours	29 September	(Australia) Rob Phillis	(United States) Doug Polen	(United States) Doug Polen	Team Fast by Ferracci
12	R1	(Italy) Mugello	6 October	(United States) Doug Polen	(United States) Doug Polen	(United States) Doug Polen	Team Fast by Ferracci
12	R2	(Italy) Mugello	6 October	(United States) Doug Polen	(Italy) Giancarlo Falappa	(France) Raymond Roche	Squadra Corse Ducati Lucchinelli
13	R1	(Australia) Phillip Island	19 October	(United States) Doug Polen	(New Zealand) Aaron Slight	(Australia) Kevin Magee	Peter Jackson Yamaha Racing
13	R2	(Australia) Phillip Island	19 October	(United States) Doug Polen	(New Zealand) Aaron Slight	(United States) Doug Polen	Team Fast by Ferracci

== Championship standings ==
In each race, points were awarded as follows:

Position	1st	2nd	3rd	4th	5th	6th	7th	8th	9th	10th	11th	12th	13th	14th	15th
Points	20	17	15	13	11	10	9	8	7	6	5	4	3	2	1

=== Riders' standings ===
1991 final riders' standings
Pos.	Rider	Bike	GBR (United Kingdom)		SPA (Spain)		CAN (Canada)		USA (United States)		AUT (Austria)		SMR (San Marino)		SWE (Sweden)		JPN (Japan)		MAL (Malaysia)		GER (Germany)		FRA (France)		ITA (Italy)		AUS (Australia)		Pts
Pos.	Rider	Bike	R1	R2	R1	R2	R1	R2	R1	R2	R1	R2	R1	R2	R1	R2	R1	R2	R1	R2	R1	R2	R1	R2	R1	R2	R1	R2	Pts
1	(United States) Doug Polen	Ducati	**1**	**Ret**	**1**	**1**			1	1	**2**	**1**	**1**	**1**	**1**	**1**	**1**	**1**	**4**	**5**	**1**	**2**	1	1	**1**	**2**	**2**	**1**	432
2	(France) Raymond Roche	Ducati	Ret	2	Ret	3			DNS	DNS	3	3	4	2	Ret	3	6	2	1	1	2	1	2	2	2	1			282
3	(Australia) Rob Phillis	Kawasaki	4	3	2	Ret			4	5	4	4	2	3	2	2	2	Ret	5	Ret	4	4	**4**	**5**	DNS	DNS	4	3	267
4	(Belgium) Stéphane Mertens	Ducati	Ret	1	Ret	2			**3**	**3**	1	2	6	Ret	Ret	Ret	Ret	Ret	9	2	5	6	7	3	4	Ret	5	6	217
5	(Italy) Fabrizio Pirovano	Yamaha	3	8	5	5			5	6	Ret	5	5	4	3	Ret	7	7	2	3	Ret	7	Ret	6	Ret	6			195
6	(United Kingdom) Terry Rymer	Yamaha	2	4	7	Ret			DNS	DNS	6	9	8	9	7	12	Ret	14	10	Ret	7	9	5	4	3	3			162
7	(United Kingdom) Carl Fogarty	Honda	Ret	9	9	8			11	11			7	8	4	4	11	8	8	7	9	10	6	7	7	Ret			146
8	(United States) Fred Merkel	Honda	Ret	Ret	Ret	Ret			6	4	8	8	9	7	8	6	12	9	12	9	Ret	Ret	3	10	8	Ret			124
9	(Italy) Giancarlo Falappa	Ducati	14	Ret	Ret	Ret			7	Ret	Ret	7	10	6	6	13	10	11	6	Ret	6	3	Ret	8	6	Ret			113
10	(Italy) Davide Tardozzi	Ducati									5	6	3	5			9	10	3	6	3	8			DNS	DNS			108
11	(Germany) Udo Mark	Yamaha			8	7					7	10	11	Ret	10	10	18	Ret			8	5							68
12	(Netherlands) Jeffrey de Vries	Yamaha	9	10	15	Ret			10	10	11	12	16	16	12	Ret	Ret	24	13	13	13	Ret	12	14	15	5	Ret	Ret	66
13	(New Zealand) Aaron Slight	Kawasaki															3	4	7	4							3	Ret	65
14	(Australia) Kevin Magee	Yamaha															5	3									1	2	63
15	(Finland) Jari Suhonen	Yamaha	DNS	DNS	Ret	9					9	11	Ret	15	5	7	Ret	17			14	12	9	12	17	12			61
16	(Spain) Juan López Mella	Honda	11	11	3	4			14	DNS	17	Ret	Ret	11	Ret	Ret	17	18	14	10	DNQ	DNQ	16	18	13	15			57
17	(United States) Scott Russell	Kawasaki							2	2							8	5											53
18	(Spain) Daniel Amatriain	Honda	Ret	13	4	6					12	17	13	13	14	11	DNS	DNS			15	21	20	13					47
19	(Switzerland) Edwin Weibel	Honda	13	14	Ret	Ret																							41
19	(Switzerland) Edwin Weibel	Ducati											18	Ret							10	11	14	9	9	7			41
20	(France) Jean-Yves Mounier	Yamaha	DNS	DNS					13	9	10	14	20	17	9	9	21	20	18	12	11	Ret	DNS	DNS					41
21	(United Kingdom) Rob McElnea	Yamaha	5	5											11	8					Ret	16							35
22	(United Kingdom) Brian Morrison	Yamaha	6	6																			8	11	18	Ret			33
23	(United Kingdom) Niall Mackenzie	Honda	7	7	Ret	DNS			15	12																			33
23	(United Kingdom) Niall Mackenzie	Yamaha															Ret	6											33
24	(Canada) Linnley Clarke	Yamaha					4	2																					30
25	(Canada) Yves Brisson	Honda					2	4																					30
26	(Italy) Baldassarre Monti	Honda	Ret	Ret	6	Ret			8	7	DNS	DNS													DNS	DNS			27
27	(Canada) Steve Crevier	Kawasaki					3	5																					26
28	(Australia) Malcolm Campbell	Honda															19	21									6	4	23
29	(Canada) Rueben McMurter	Honda					Ret	3	12	13																			22
30	(Australia) Scott Doohan	Yamaha																	17	14							7	5	22
31	(Italy) Massimo Broccoli	Kawasaki			21	14					DNQ	DNQ	12	12							22	Ret			10	11			21
32	(United States) Tom Kipp	Yamaha					**Ret**	**1**	Ret	Ret							22	22											20
33	(Canada) Pascal Picotte	Yamaha					1	Ret																					20
34	(Canada) Benoît Pilon	Yamaha					6	6																					20
35	(Italy) Piergiorgio Bontempi	Kawasaki											NC	Ret	16	Ret					DNQ	DNQ	11	DNS	Ret	4			18
36	(Australia) Steve Martin	Suzuki																									8	7	17
37	(United States) John Hopperstad	Yamaha					8	7	18	DNS																			17
38	(Germany) Peter Rubatto	Yamaha	Ret	16	12	Ret					15	13			13	DNS					Ret	13	23	DNS	Ret	13			17
39	(Canada) Jacques Guenette	Kawasaki							9	8																			15
40	(Australia) Michael O'Connor	Honda																									10	8	14
Pos.	Rider	Bike	GBR (United Kingdom)		SPA (Spain)		CAN (Canada)		USA (United States)		AUT (Austria)		SMR (San Marino)		SWE (Sweden)		JPN (Japan)		MAL (Malaysia)		GER (Germany)		FRA (France)		ITA (Italy)		AUS (Australia)		Pts

Colour	Result
Gold	Winner
Silver	Second place
Bronze	Third place
Green	Points classification
Blue	Non-points classification
Blue	Non-classified finish (NC)
Purple	Retired, not classified (Ret)
Red	Did not qualify (DNQ)
Red	Did not pre-qualify (DNPQ)
Black	Disqualified (DSQ)
White	Did not start (DNS)
White	Withdrew (WD)
White	Race cancelled (C)
Blank	Did not practice (DNP)
Blank	Did not arrive (DNA)
Blank	Excluded (EX)

**Bold** – Pole position
Italics – Fastest lap

=== Manufacturers' standings ===
1991 final manufacturers' standings
Pos.	Manufacturer	GBR (United Kingdom)		SPA (Spain)		CAN (Canada)		USA (United States)		AUT (Austria)		SMR (San Marino)		SWE (Sweden)		JPN (Japan)		MAL (Malaysia)		GER (Germany)		FRA (France)		ITA (Italy)		AUS (Australia)		Pts
Pos.	Manufacturer	R1	R2	R1	R2	R1	R2	R1	R2	R1	R2	R1	R2	R1	R2	R1	R2	R1	R2	R1	R2	R1	R2	R1	R2	R1	R2	Pts
1	(Italy) Ducati	1	1	1	1	7	13	1	1	1	1	1	1	1	1	1	1	1	1	1	1	1	1	1	1	2	1	489
2	(Japan) Yamaha	2	4	5	5	1	1	5	6	6	5	5	4	3	5	4	3	2	3	7	5	5	4	3	3	1	2	355
3	(Japan) Kawasaki	3	4	2	14	3	5	2	2	4	4	2	3	2	2	2	4	5	4	4	4	4	5	11	4	3	3	351
4	(Japan) Honda	7	7	3	4	2	3	6	4	8	8	7	7	4	4	11	8	8	7	9	10	3	7	7	11	6	4	265
5	(Japan) Suzuki					11	11	20	15	Ret	Ret			21	Ret	15	15	21	Ret	DNQ	DNQ					8	7	30
6	(Italy) Bimota	15	20	Ret	13					Ret	15	14	10							DNS	DNS							13
Pos.	Manufacturer	GBR (United Kingdom)		SPA (Spain)		CAN (Canada)		USA (United States)		AUT (Austria)		SMR (San Marino)		SWE (Sweden)		JPN (Japan)		MAL (Malaysia)		GER (Germany)		FRA (France)		ITA (Italy)		AUS (Australia)		Pts
