= Donington Superbike World Championship round =

Donington Superbike World Championship round or Donington Park Superbike World Championship round may refer to:

- 1988 Donington Superbike World Championship round
- 2007 Donington Park Superbike World Championship round
- 2008 Donington Park Superbike World Championship round
- 2009 Donington Superbike World Championship round
- 2011 Donington Superbike World Championship round
- 2012 Donington Superbike World Championship round
- 2016 Donington Park Superbike World Championship round

== See also ==
- Donington Park
