= Fred Merkel =

American motorcycle racer

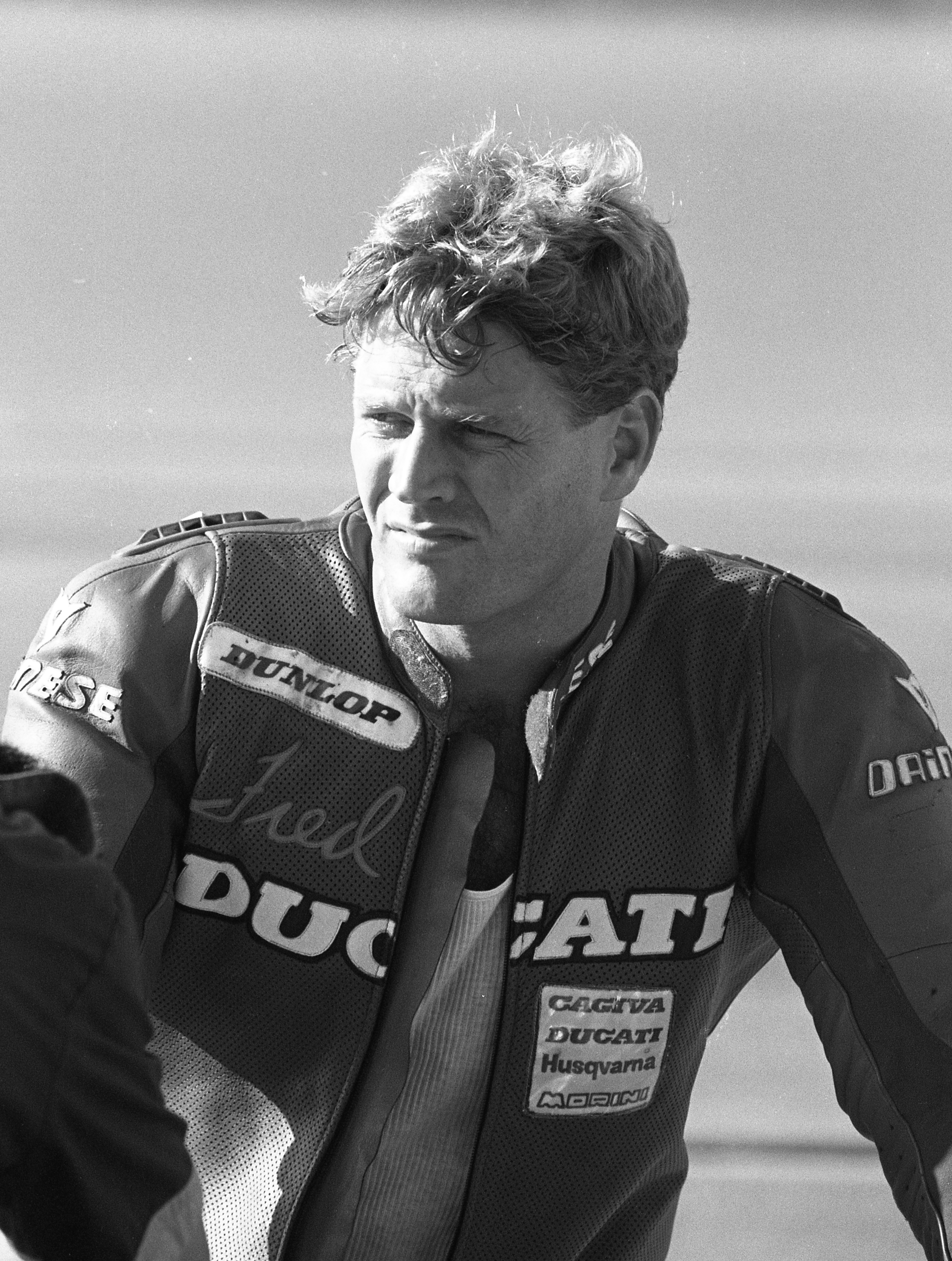
Motorcycle racing career statistics
Superbike World Championship
Active years	1988 - 1993
Manufacturers	Honda
Championships	2 (1988, 1989)
1993 championship position	11th (91,5 pts)
Starts / Wins / Podiums / Poles / F. laps / Points; 117 / 8 / 24 / 4 / 7 / 848,5

Fred Merkel (born September 28, 1962, in Stockton, California) is an American former professional motorcycle road racer and two-time Superbike World Champion.

== Motorcycle racing career ==
In 1984, Merkel teamed with Mike Baldwin to win the Suzuka 8 Hours endurance race. He is a three-time AMA Superbike Champion, winning in 1984/5 on the VF750 and 1986 on the VFR750F. He jointly holds the record for the most wins in a season with Mat Mladin.

In 1988, the Superbike World Championship began, with Merkel entered on the RC30. He won the championship from Fabrizio Pirovano and Davide Tardozzi with two wins and three other podiums. He successfully defended the crown in 1989, with three wins, seven other podiums, and four poles. He took three more wins en route to sixth overall in 1990, but was less competitive after this.

Merkel retired from racing at the end of the 1995 season after being injured in an accident at Firebird International Raceway in Chandler, Arizona. Merkel and his family moved to a ranch they owned in New Zealand. He lives there with his wife Carla and son Travis, and as of the summer of 2009 welcomed newborn son Jhett.

Merkel was inducted into the AMA Motorcycle Hall of Fame in 2001.

Merkel was inducted into the Motorsports Hall of Fame of America in 2018.

== Career statistics ==
=== Superbike World Championship ===
==== Races by year ====
Year	Make	1		2		3		4		5		6		7		8		9		10		11		12		13		Pos.	Pts
Year	Make	R1	R2	R1	R2	R1	R2	R1	R2	R1	R2	R1	R2	R1	R2	R1	R2	R1	R2	R1	R2	R1	R2	R1	R2	R1	R2	Pos.	Pts
1988	Honda	GBR; 4	GBR; 2	HUN; 1	HUN; 5	GER; 17	GER; Ret	AUT; Ret	AUT; 8	JPN; 2	JPN; 11	FRA; 6	FRA; C	POR; 4	POR; 5	AUS; 4	AUS; 3	NZL; 1	NZL; 5									1st	99
1989	Honda	GBR; 4	GBR; 6	**HUN**; 1	**HUN**; 1	**CAN**; 1	**CAN**; 3	**USA**; 4	**USA**; 3	AUT; 11	AUT; 3	FRA; 8	FRA; 4	JPN; 16	JPN; 12	GER; 8	GER; 4	ITA; 2	ITA; 2	AUS; 11	AUS; 5	**NZL**; 3	**NZL**; 3					1st	272
1990	Honda	SPA; 2	SPA; 3	GBR; 1	GBR; 3	HUN; 1	HUN; 6	GER; 1	GER; 3	CAN; 5	CAN; 10	USA; 7	USA; 10	AUT; 7	AUT; 4	JPN	JPN	FRA	FRA	ITA; Ret	ITA; 5	MAL	MAL	AUS	AUS	NZL	NZL	6th	197
1991	Honda	GBR; Ret	GBR; Ret	SPA; Ret	SPA; Ret	CAN	CAN	USA; 6	USA; 4	AUT; 8	AUT; 8	SMR; 9	SMR; 7	SWE; 8	SWE; 6	JPN; 12	JPN; 9	MAL; 12	MAL; 9	GER; Ret	GER; Ret	FRA; 3	FRA; 10	ITA; 8	ITA; Ret	AUS	AUS	8th	124
1992	Yamaha	SPA	SPA	GBR	GBR	GER	GER	BEL	BEL	SPA; 17	SPA; Ret	AUT; 9	AUT; 10	ITA; Ret	ITA; Ret	MAL; 11	MAL; 5	JPN; 26	JPN; 13	NED; 13	NED; Ret	ITA; Ret	ITA; Ret	AUS; 10	AUS; 12	NZL; 6	NZL; 6	13th	65
1993	Yamaha	IRL; 7	IRL; 7	GER; Ret	GER; 12	SPA; 9	SPA; 12																					11th	91,5
1993	Ducati							SMR; 10	SMR; 27	AUT; 11	AUT; 2	CZE; Ret	CZE; 5	SWE; 12	SWE; Ret	MAL; 9	MAL; Ret	JPN; Ret	JPN; Ret	NED; 11	NED; Ret	ITA	ITA	GBR	GBR	POR; 11	POR; 9	11th	91,5

=== Grand Prix motorcycle racing ===
==== Races by year ====
(key) (Races in bold indicate pole position, races in italics indicate fastest lap)

Year	Class	Bike	1	2	3	4	5	6	7	8	9	10	11	12	13	14	15	Pos	Pts
1989	500cc	Honda	JPN	AUS	USA	SPA	NAT; Ret	GER	AUT	YUG	NED	BEL	FRA; Ret	GBR; 11	SWE	CZE	BRA	36th	5

=== Suzuka 8 Hours results ===
Year	Team	Co-Rider	Bike	Pos
1984	(United States) Honda America	(United States) Fred Merkel (United States) Mike Baldwin	Honda RVF750 RC45	**1st**

Preceded by Wayne Rainey	AMA Superbike Champion; 1984–1986	Succeeded by Wayne Rainey
None	World Superbike Champion; 1988–1989	Succeeded by Raymond Roche
