= 1988 Superbike World Championship =

1988 Superbike World Championship
Previous:	none	Next:	1989

The 1988 Superbike World Championship was the inaugural FIM Superbike World Championship season. The season started on 3 April at Donington Park and finished on 3 October at Manfeild Autocourse after nine rounds.

American Fred Merkel won the riders' championship and Honda won the manufacturers' championship.

== Race calendar and results ==
The second Le Mans race was not held due to schedule issues.

1988 Superbike World Championship Calendar
Round		Country	Circuit	Date	Pole position	Fastest lap	Winning rider	Winning team	Report
1	R1	(United Kingdom) Great Britain	Donington Park	3 April	(United Kingdom) Roger Burnett	(Italy) Marco Lucchinelli	(Italy) Davide Tardozzi	Bimota SpA	Report
1	R2	(United Kingdom) Great Britain	Donington Park	3 April	(United Kingdom) Roger Burnett	(United States) Bubba Shobert	(Italy) Marco Lucchinelli	Ducati Team Lucky	Report
2	R1	Hungary	Hungaroring	30 April	(Italy) Davide Tardozzi	(United States) Fred Merkel	(United States) Fred Merkel	RCM	Report
2	R2	Hungary	Hungaroring	30 April	(Italy) Davide Tardozzi	(Italy) Marco Lucchinelli	(France) Adrien Morillas	Team Kawasaki France	Report
3	R1	West Germany	Hockenheimring	8 May	(Portugal) Alex Vieira	(France) Christophe Bouheben	(Italy) Davide Tardozzi	Bimota SpA	Report
3	R2	West Germany	Hockenheimring	8 May	(Portugal) Alex Vieira	(Italy) Virginio Ferrari	(Italy) Davide Tardozzi	Bimota SpA	Report
4	R1	Austria	Zeltweg	3 July	(Australia) Malcolm Campbell	(Italy) Davide Tardozzi	(Italy) Marco Lucchinelli	Ducati Team Lucky	Report
4	R2	Austria	Zeltweg	3 July	(Australia) Malcolm Campbell	(France) Christophe Bouheben	(Italy) Davide Tardozzi	Bimota SpA	Report
5	R1	Japan	Sugo	28 August	(Italy) Marco Lucchinelli	(Canada) Gary Goodfellow	(Canada) Gary Goodfellow	Don Knit Sugano Racing Team	Report
5	R2	Japan	Sugo	28 August	(Italy) Marco Lucchinelli	(Japan) Kenichiro Iwahashi	(Australia) Mick Doohan	Marlboro Yamaha Dealer Team	Report
6	R1	France	Le Mans	4 September	(Italy) Marco Lucchinelli	(Italy) Fabrizio Pirovano	(Italy) Fabrizio Pirovano	Moto Club Carate Brianza	Report
6	R2	France	Le Mans	4 September	(Italy) Marco Lucchinelli	Race cancelled			Report
7	R1	Portugal	Estoril	11 September	(Belgium) Stéphane Mertens	(Italy) Davide Tardozzi	(Italy) Davide Tardozzi	Bimota SpA	Report
7	R2	Portugal	Estoril	11 September	(Belgium) Stéphane Mertens	(France) Raymond Roche	(Belgium) Stéphane Mertens	Bimota SpA	Report
8	R1	Australia	Oran Park	25 September	(Australia) Mick Doohan	(United States) Fred Merkel	(Australia) Mick Doohan	Marlboro Yamaha Dealer Team	Report
8	R2	Australia	Oran Park	25 September	(Australia) Mick Doohan	(Australia) Mick Doohan	(Australia) Mick Doohan	Marlboro Yamaha Dealer Team	Report
9	R1	New Zealand	Manfeild	2 October	(Italy) Davide Tardozzi	(United States) Fred Merkel	(United States) Fred Merkel	RCM	Report
9	R2	New Zealand	Manfeild	2 October	(Italy) Davide Tardozzi	(Belgium) Stéphane Mertens	(Belgium) Stéphane Mertens	Bimota SpA	Report

== Championship standings ==
Scoring system
Position	**1st**	**2nd**	**3rd**	**4th**	**5th**	**6th**	**7th**	**8th**	**9th**	**10th**	**11th**	**12th**	**13th**	**14th**	**15th**
Original	20	17	15	13	11	10	9	8	7	6	5	4	3	2	1
Revised	10	8.5	7.5	6.5	5.5	5	4.5	4	3.5	3	2.5	2	1.5	1	0.5

For the first ever Superbike World Championship round at Donington Park, and for the only time in the championship's history, the race results were combined to determine an overall winner. For future weekends, it was decided to award half points for each race instead, although the original system was used again at Le Mans due to only one race being run.

=== Riders' standings ===
Pos.	Rider	Bike	GBR (United Kingdom)		HUN (Hungary)		FRG (West Germany)		AUT (Austria)		JPN (Japan)		FRA (France)		POR (Portugal)		AUS (Australia)		NZL (New Zealand)		Pts
Pos.	Rider	Bike	R1	R2	R1	R2	R1	R2	R1	R2	R1	R2	R1	R2	R1	R2	R1	R2	R1	R2	Pts
1	(United States) Fred Merkel	Honda	4	2	1	5	17	Ret	Ret	8	2	11	6	C	4	5	4	3	1	5	99
2	(Italy) Fabrizio Pirovano	Yamaha	8	4	5	6	11	8	2	7	Ret	10	1	C	6	6	6	7	2	13	93.5
3	(Italy) Davide Tardozzi	Bimota	1	Ret	**2**	**3**	1	1	5	1	Ret	4	12	C	1	2	11	10	**5**	**DNS**	91.5
4	(Belgium) Stéphane Mertens	Bimota	Ret	Ret	3	2	13	2			4	16	3	C	**2**	**1**	7	6	6	1	90.5
5	(Italy) Marco Lucchinelli	Ducati	2	1	9	Ret	6	11	1	Ret	**12**	**Ret**	**10**	C	3	4					63
6	(Portugal) Alex Vieira	Honda					**3**	**3**	4	3			4	C							42
7	(Australia) Rob Phillis	Kawasaki							8	Ret	6	6					3	4	4	3	42
8	(Canada) Gary Goodfellow	Suzuki	Ret	DNS							1	3									39.5
8	(Canada) Gary Goodfellow	Honda															8	5	3	6	39.5
9	(Australia) Malcolm Campbell	Honda							**3**	**6**	17	15					5	8	11	2	33.5
10	(United Kingdom) Terry Rymer	Honda											8	C	5	3	14	11	9	7	32.5
11	(United Kingdom) Roger Burnett	Honda	**Ret**	**3**	8	4	5	4	Ret	DNS			7	C							31.5
12	(Australia) Mick Doohan	Yamaha									NC	1					**1**	**1**			30
13	(United Kingdom) Joey Dunlop	Honda	3	5	6	Ret	7	5													30
14	(France) Eric Delcamp	Kawasaki			11	13	9	6					2	C							29.5
15	(France) Christophe Bouheben	Honda					2	Ret	Ret	2			5	C							28
16	(France) Adrien Morillas	Kawasaki			4	1	19	16	7	5			Ret	C							26.5
17	(Switzerland) Edwin Weibel	Honda					4	Ret	6	4	Ret	5	16	C			Ret	DNS			23.5
18	(Finland) Jari Suhonen	Yamaha	7	10	14	10	Ret	DNS	17	13	16	27	11	C	Ret	13					21
19	(United Kingdom) Andy McGladdery	Suzuki	9	7	15	Ret	DNQ	DNQ													18.5
19	(United Kingdom) Andy McGladdery	Honda											19	C	15	12	12	13	14	10	18.5
20	(Sweden) Anders Andersson	Suzuki	25	12	18	12	20	23	9	12	15	19	13	C	8	9					18.5
21	(Australia) Robert Scolyer	Honda															9	9	8	4	17.5
22	(Australia) Michael Dowson	Yamaha									Ret	Ret					2	2			17
23	(United Kingdom) Paul Iddon	Bimota	Ret	DNS	12	8	12	13	32	Ret					9	8					17
24	(Italy) Virginio Ferrari	Honda	DNQ	DNQ	Ret	11	10	9	Ret	Ret	10	8	Ret	C							16
25	(United Kingdom) Kenny Irons	Honda	6	8			14	7													15.5
26	(West Germany) Ernst Gschwender	Suzuki			10	9	18	27	10	10			Ret	C	12	Ret					14.5
27	(United Kingdom) Roger Marshall	Suzuki	5	6							20	18									13
28	(Italy) Marino Fabbri	Bimota					28	Ret	Ret	9			9	C	16	11					13
29	(United Kingdom) Robert Dunlop	Honda	Ret	DNS	26	17	29	21			21	23	18	C	10	7	13	14	15	12	12.5
30	(Canada) Tommy Douglas	Yamaha	16	15													17	Ret	7	11	11
31	(Japan) Yukiya Oshima	Suzuki									3	13									9
32	(Denmark) René Rasmussen	Suzuki			7	7	21	Ret	Ret	DNS			DNQ	C	21	Ret					9
33	(Japan) Kenichiro Iwahashi	Honda									Ret	2									8.5
34	(Japan) Tadaaki Hanamura	Honda									8	9									7.5
35	(United Kingdom) Steve Williams	Bimota	11	9	19	16	31	Ret													7
36	(West Germany) Peter Rubatto	Bimota	Ret	Ret	21	14	15	14	16	Ret			23	C	7	17					7
37	(Switzerland) Andreas Hofmann	Honda					8	10													7
38	(New Zealand) Glenn Williams	Ducati																	10	8	7
39	(Republic of Ireland) Mark Farmer	Suzuki	14	11																	6
40	(Italy) Mauro Ricci	Ducati							15	Ret			21	C	11	10					6
41	(Japan) Mitsuaki Watanabe	Yamaha									5	24									5.5
42	(New Zealand) Aaron Slight	Bimota									7	14									5.5
43	(Japan) Koichi Kobayashi	Honda									9	12									5.5
44	(New Zealand) Andrew Stroud	Bimota																	13	9	5
45	(Australia) Sean Gallagher	Honda															10	12			5
46	(United Kingdom) Dave Leach	Yamaha	15	13	24	18	DNQ	DNQ					22	C							5
47	(United Kingdom) Brian Morrison	Honda									26	7									4.5
48	(United Kingdom) John Lofthouse	Suzuki	17	14																	3
49	(West Germany) Karl Heinz Riegl	Bimota			DNQ	DNQ	DNQ	DNQ	11	18			25	C	18	19					2.5
50	(Belgium) Paul Ramon	Honda							Ret	11			DNS	C							2.5
51	(Japan) Toshiharu Kaneko	Yamaha									11	25									2.5
52	(Austria) Dietmar Kemter	Honda							12	15											2.5
53	(New Zealand) Mike King	Ducati																	12	15	2.5
54	(West Germany) Udo Mark	Bimota					22	17	13	14			27	C	17	16					2.5
55	(West Germany) Anton Gruschka	Honda					24	24					Ret	C	13	14					2.5
56	(United Kingdom) Asa Moyce	Kawasaki	19	16	DNQ	DNQ	DNQ	DNQ													2
57	(West Germany) Bodo Schmidt	Bimota					Ret	12	Ret	Ret											2
58	(France) Jean-Yves Mounier	Yamaha											14	C							2
59	(West Germany) Michael Galinski	Bimota	Ret	DNS	13	Ret	Ret	15													2
60	(France) Jean-Louis Guignabodet	Honda			20	15	25	Ret	18	17			17	C	14	15					2
61	(Japan) Hisatomo Nakamura	Suzuki									13	17									1.5
62	(Finland) Esko Kuparinen	Kawasaki	20	17	25	23	DNQ	DNQ													1
63	(West Germany) Dieter Heinen	Honda							14	16			DNS	C							1
64	(Japan) Satoshi Endoh	Honda									14	22									1
65	(United Kingdom) Mark Linscott	Honda											15	C							1
66	(New Zealand) Dale Warren	Honda																	NC	14	1
67	(Australia) Iain Pero	Suzuki															15	Ret			0.5
68	(Australia) Len Willing	Yamaha															Ret	15			0.5
Pos.	Rider	Bike	GBR (United Kingdom)		HUN (Hungary)		FRG (West Germany)		AUT (Austria)		JPN (Japan)		FRA (France)		POR (Portugal)		AUS (Australia)		NZL (New Zealand)		Pts

Colour	Result
Gold	Winner
Silver	Second place
Bronze	Third place
Green	Points classification
Blue	Non-points classification
Blue	Non-classified finish (NC)
Purple	Retired, not classified (Ret)
Red	Did not qualify (DNQ)
Red	Did not pre-qualify (DNPQ)
Black	Disqualified (DSQ)
White	Did not start (DNS)
White	Withdrew (WD)
White	Race cancelled (C)
Blank	Did not practice (DNP)
Blank	Did not arrive (DNA)
Blank	Excluded (EX)

**Bold** – Pole position
Italics – Fastest lap

=== Manufacturers' standings ===
Pos.	Manufacturer	GBR (United Kingdom)		HUN (Hungary)		FRG (West Germany)		AUT (Austria)		JPN (Japan)		FRA (France)		POR (Portugal)		AUS (Australia)		NZL (New Zealand)		Pts
Pos.	Manufacturer	R1	R2	R1	R2	R1	R2	R1	R2	R1	R2	R1	R2	R1	R2	R1	R2	R1	R2	Pts
1	(Japan) Honda	3	2	1	4	2	3	3	2	2	2	4	C	4	3	4	3	1	2	142
2	(Italy) Bimota	1	9	2	2	1	1	5	1	4	4	3	C	1	1	7	6	5	1	132.5
3	(Japan) Yamaha	7	4	5	6	11	8	2	7	5	1	1	C	6	6	1	1	2	11	117.5
4	(Japan) Kawasaki	19	16	4	1	9	6	7	5	6	6	2	C	25	24	3	4	4	3	92
5	(Italy) Ducati	2	1	9	Ret	6	11	1	21	12	Ret	10	C	3	4	20	19	10	8	70
6	(Japan) Suzuki	5	6	7	7	18	20	9	10	1	3	13	C	8	9	15	16	16	16	57
Pos.	Manufacturer	GBR (United Kingdom)		HUN (Hungary)		FRG (West Germany)		AUT (Austria)		JPN (Japan)		FRA (France)		POR (Portugal)		AUS (Australia)		NZL (New Zealand)		Pts
