= 1989 United States motorcycle Grand Prix =

Motorcycle race at Laguna Seca

1989 United States Grand Prix
Race details
- Race 3 of 15 races in the 1989 Grand Prix motorcycle racing season
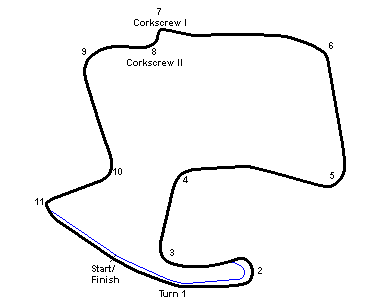
- Date: April 16, 1989
- Official name: Dunlop USGP
- Location: Laguna Seca Raceway
- Course: Permanent racing facility; 3.602 km (2.238 mi)

500cc
Pole position
- Rider: (United States) Wayne Rainey
- Time: 1:27.120
Fastest lap
- Rider: (Australia) Wayne Gardner
- Time: 1:28.000
Podium
- First: (United States) Wayne Rainey
- Second: (United States) Kevin Schwantz
- Third: (United States) Eddie Lawson

250cc
Pole position
- Rider: (United States) John Kocinski
- Time: 1:30.160
Fastest lap
- Rider: (United States) John Kocinski
- Time: 1:29.190
Podium
- First: (United States) John Kocinski
- Second: (United States) Jim Filice
- Third: (Italy) Luca Cadalora

The 1989 United States Motorcycle Grand Prix was the third round of the 1989 Grand Prix motorcycle racing season. It occurred from April 14 to April 16, 1989, at Laguna Seca Raceway.

== 500 cc race report ==
Leading the pack are Wayne Rainey, Kevin Schwantz, Wayne Gardner, Kevin Magee, and Christian Sarron. Eddie Lawson swiftly moves from 6th to 2nd position in the first turn. Rainey begins to widen the gap, while Lawson and Schwantz engage in a close battle. However, Lawson makes a mistake while entering the Corkscrew, causing him to fall back into the group of Gardner, Magee, and Sarron.

Gardner crashes, fracturing his leg. Lawson capitalizes on fuel-delivery issues with Magee's Yamaha YZR 500 on the final lap, securing an all-American podium with Rainey taking first place and Schwantz in second.

During the cooldown lap, Magee, frustrated, initiates a burnout just after turn five. Bubba Shobert, conversing with Eddie Lawson at a low cruising speed, fails to notice Magee and accidentally collides with his right side, resulting in a forceful impact with the pavement. Shobert sustains severe head injuries that mark the end of his racing career, while Magee suffers a broken ankle. With both Magee and Gardner injured, Wayne Rainey's lead in the standings becomes vulnerable, depending on Lawson's ability to optimize the Honda setup or Schwantz's consistency in finishing races.

== 500 cc classification ==
Pos.	Rider	Team	Manufacturer	Laps	Time/Retired	Grid	Points
1	(United States) Wayne Rainey	Team Lucky Strike Roberts	Yamaha	40	58:56.179	1	20
2	(United States) Kevin Schwantz	Suzuki Pepsi Cola	Suzuki	40	+6.849	2	17
3	(United States) Eddie Lawson	Rothmans Kanemoto Honda	Honda	40	+19.912	6	15
4	(Australia) Kevin Magee	Team Lucky Strike Roberts	Yamaha	40	+23.732	4	13
5	(United Kingdom) Niall Mackenzie	Marlboro Yamaha Team Agostini	Yamaha	40	+28.223	7	11
6	(France) Christian Sarron	Sonauto Gauloises Blondes Yamaha Mobil 1	Yamaha	40	+30.595	5	10
7	(Italy) Pierfrancesco Chili	HB Honda Gallina Team	Honda	40	+1:29.901	11	9
8	(Australia) Mick Doohan	Rothmans Honda Team	Honda	39	+1 Lap	12	8
9	(United States) Bubba Shobert	Cabin Racing Team	Honda	39	+1 Lap	13	7
10	(France) Dominique Sarron	Team ROC Elf Honda	Honda	39	+1 Lap	15	6
11	(Italy) Alessandro Valesi	Team Iberia	Yamaha	38	+2 Laps	16	5
12	(Switzerland) Marco Gentile	Fior Marlboro	Fior	38	+2 Laps	17	4
13	(United Kingdom) Simon Buckmaster	Racing Team Katayama	Honda	38	+2 Laps	18	3
14	(Switzerland) Bruno Kneubuhler	Romer Racing Suisse	Honda	38	+2 Laps	19	2
15	(West Germany) Michael Rudroff	HRK Motors	Honda	38	+3 Laps	21	1
16	(Spain) Francisco Gonzales	Club Motocross Pozuelo	Honda	37	+4 Laps	23	
17	(Italy) Vincenzo Cascino		Honda	37	+4 Laps	22	
Ret	(United Kingdom) Ron Haslam	Suzuki Pepsi Cola	Suzuki		Retirement	10	
Ret	(Japan) Tadahiko Taira	Yamaha Motor Company	Yamaha		Retirement	8	
Ret	(Switzerland) Nicholas Schmassman	FMS	Honda		Retirement	20	
Ret	(United States) Randy Mamola	Cagiva Corse	Cagiva		Retirement	14	
Ret	(United States) Eugene Brown		Suzuki		Retirement	24	
Ret	(Australia) Wayne Gardner	Rothmans Honda Team	Honda		Retirement	3	
DNS	(United States) Freddie Spencer	Marlboro Yamaha Team Agostini	Yamaha		Did not Start	9	
DNQ	(United States) David Busby		Honda		Did not Qualify		
DNQ	(United States) Michael Wild		Suzuki		Did not Qualify		

Previous race: 1989 Australian Grand Prix	FIM Grand Prix World Championship; 1989 season	Next race: 1989 Spanish Grand Prix
Previous race: 1988 United States Grand Prix	United States Grand Prix	Next race: 1990 United States Grand Prix
