= Roger Burnett =

Former Grand Prix motorcycle road racer from Great Britain

- Nationality: British
- Born: 2 March 1960 (age 66); Brigg, Lincolnshire, England
Motorcycle racing career statistics
Grand Prix motorcycle racing
Active years	1984 - 1989
First race	1984 500cc British Grand Prix
Last race	1989 500cc British Grand Prix
Team(s)	Suzuki, Honda
Starts / Wins / Podiums / Poles / F. laps / Points; 26 / 0 / 0 / 0 / 0 / 50
Superbike World Championship
Active years	1988 - 1991
Manufacturers	Suzuki, Honda
Starts / Wins / Podiums / Poles / F. laps / Points; 19 / 0 / 3 / 2 / 1 / 67.5

Roger Peter Burnett (born 2 March 1960) is a former Grand Prix motorcycle road racer from Great Britain. He competed in the 500cc class between 1984 and 1989.

In 1988, Burnett took the first pole positions in World Superbike history at Donington Park.

Burnett competed in 26 Superbike races, starting in 19 of them, between 1988 and 1991, achieving three podiums.

After competing, Burnett was a mentor and manager for various riders including Neil Hodgson, James Toseland and Jonathan Rea.

== Motorcycle Grand Prix results ==
Points system from 1984-1987:

Position	1	2	3	4	5	6	7	8	9	10
Points	15	12	10	8	6	5	4	3	2	1

Points system from 1988-1989:

Position	1	2	3	4	5	6	7	8	9	10	11	12	13	14	15
Points	20	17	15	13	11	10	9	8	7	6	5	4	3	2	1

Year	Class	Team	Bike	1	2	3	4	5	6	7	8	9	10	11	12	13	14	15	Points	Rank
1984	500cc	Men Only Salon	RG500	RSA	NAT	ESP	AUT	GER	FRA	YUG	NED	BEL	GBR; Ret	SWE; 11	RSM				0	
1985	500cc	Rothmans Honda Britain	RS500	RSA	ESP	GER	NAT	AUT	YUG	NED	BEL	FRA	GBR; 8	SWE	RSM				3	19th
1986	500cc	Rothmans Honda Britain	RS500/NS500	ESP	NAT; Ret	GER	AUT	YUG	NED; 8	BEL; DNS	FRA	GBR; 11	SWE	SMR					3	21st
1987	500cc	Rothmans Honda	NSR500	JPN; 8	ESP; 9	GER; 8	NAT; 11	AUT; 8	YUG; 11	NED; 7	FRA; 10	GBR; 9	SWE; 10	CZE; 10	SMR; 6	POR; Ret	BRA	ARG	25	11th
1988	500cc	Rothmans Honda	NSR500	JPN	USA	ESP	AND	NAT; Ret	GER	AUT	NED	BEL	YUG	FRA	GBR; 9	SWE; 8	CZE; Ret	BRA; Ret	15	18th
1989	500cc	Rothmans Honda	NSR500	JPN	AUS	USA	ESP	NAT	GER	AUT	YUG	NED	BEL	FRA	GBR; 12	SWE	CZE	BRA	4	37th

Championship	Year	Bike	Rider	TC
FIM World Endurance	1989	Honda RC45	(United Kingdom) Roger Burnett	2nd
