= Stéphane Mertens =

Belgian motorcycle racer (born 1959)

- Nationality: (Belgium) Belgian
- Born: 14 May 1959 (age 67); Paris, France
Motorcycle racing career statistics
Grand Prix motorcycle racing
Active years	1983 - 1987, 1989, 1996
First race	1984 250cc Dutch TT
Last race	1996 Australian Grand Prix
Team	Yamaha
Championships	0
Starts / Wins / Podiums / Poles / F. laps / Points; 49 / 0 / 0 / 0 / 0 / 27
Superbike World Championship
Active years	1988 - 1995
Starts / Wins / Podiums / Poles / F. laps / Points; 155 / 11 / 45 / 3 / 8
Supersport World Championship
Active years	1997–1998
Starts / Wins / Podiums / Poles / F. laps / Points; 12 / 0 / 3 / 0 / 1

Stéphane Mertens (born 14 May 1959 in Paris, France) is a Belgian former professional motorcycle road racer.

Mertens made his Grand Prix debut in 1984, racing in the 250cc class. He also won the 1984 250cc Belgian Road Racing National Championship. He continued racing in the 250cc Grands Prix in 1985, 1986 and 1987. In 1988, he made the switch to racing production based motorcycles in the inaugural Superbike World Championship. Mertens raced for Bimota in 1988, and stayed in the Superbike class until 1994 with his best result being a second-place finish behind Fred Merkel in the 1989 season, while riding for Honda.

In 1995, Mertens began to compete in the motorcycle FIM Endurance World Championship, winning that title in 1995 and 2002.

Mertens was a member of the winning team at the 1990 24 Hours of Le Mans and Bol d’Or.

== Career statistics ==
=== British Superbike Championship ===
(key) (Races in bold indicate pole position; races in italics indicate fastest lap)

Year	Class	Bike	1		2		3		4		5		6		7		8		9		10		11		12		13		Pos	Pts
Year	Class	Bike	R1	R2	R1	R2	R1	R2	R1	R2	R1	R2	R1	R2	R1	R2	R1	R2	R1	R2	R1	R2	R1	R2	R1	R2	R1	R2	Pos	Pts
2004	BSB	Yamaha	SIL	SIL	BHI	BHI	SNE	SNE	OUL	OUL	MON	MON	THR	THR	BHGP	BHGP	KNO	KNO	MAL	MAL	CRO	CRO	CAD	CAD	OUL	OUL	DON; 16	DON; 18	39th	0

=== FIM Endurance World Championship ===
Year	Bike	Rider	TC
1990	Honda RC45	(Belgium) Stéphane Mertens (France) Jean-Michel Mattioli	2nd
1990	Honda RC45	(Belgium) Stéphane Mertens (France) Jean-Michel Mattioli	1st
2000	Suzuki	(Belgium) Stéphane Mertens	2nd

==== By team ====
Year	Team	Bike	Rider	TC
2002	(China) Zongshen 2	Suzuki GSX-R1000	(Australia) Warwick Nowland (Belgium) Stéphane Mertens (Slovenia) Igor Jerman (Italy) Giovanni Bussei	1st
2004	(China) Zongshen 1	Suzuki GSX-R1000	(Australia) Warwick Nowland (Belgium) Stéphane Mertens (Slovenia) Igor Jerman	2nd
