= Davide Tardozzi =

Italian motorcycle racer

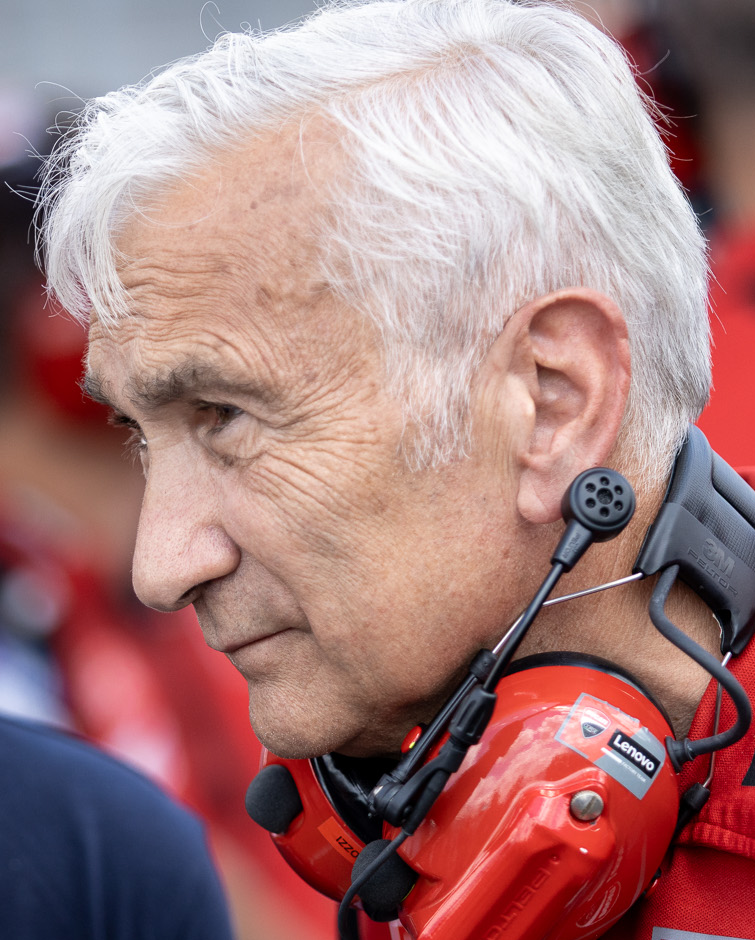
- Tardozzi at the 2026 German Grand Prix
- Nationality: Italian
- Born: 30 January 1959 (age 67); Ravenna, Italy
Motorcycle racing career statistics
Superbike World Championship
Active years	1988 - 1992
Starts / Wins / Podiums / Poles / F. laps / Points; 75 / 5 / 11 / 2 / 2 / 222.5

Davide Tardozzi (born in Ravenna, 30 January 1959) is an Italian former Superbike racer and current race team manager.

After an unsuccessful attempt at competing in the 250cc Grand Prix world championships in 1984 and 1985, Tardozzi turned his attentions to superbike racing. In the inaugural 1988 Superbike World Championship season, Tardozzi won five races on a Yamaha-powered Bimota, more than any other competitor, yet still finished third in the championship due to inconsistent results. He claimed the 1988 Italian superbike national championship as consolation. Tardozzi was a seven times Italian Superbike Champion as a rider, and a five times winner in World Superbike championship races. In 1991, he was the 750cc Superbike European Champion.

After retiring from racing, Tardozzi went on to be a successful team manager for the Ducati factory racing team, winning several Superbike World Championships with Carl Fogarty, Troy Corser, James Toseland and Troy Bayliss. In total, Tardozzi has won eight Riders' Championships as a Ducati team manager.

After his shock departure from Ducati at the end of the 2009 season, Tardozzi made a no less surprising move to become the new team manager of the official BMW Motorrad racing team in the 2010 World Superbike championship.

Tardozzi has since returned to Ducati in a Team Coordinator role in MotoGP.

== Career statistics ==
=== Superbike World Championship ===
==== Races by year ====
(key) (Races in bold indicate pole position) (Races in italics indicate fastest lap)

Year	Make	1		2		3		4		5		6		7		8		9		10		11		12		13		Pos.	Pts
Year	Make	R1	R2	R1	R2	R1	R2	R1	R2	R1	R2	R1	R2	R1	R2	R1	R2	R1	R2	R1	R2	R1	R2	R1	R2	R1	R2	Pos.	Pts
1988	Bimota	GBR; 1	GBR; Ret	**HUN**; 2	**HUN**; 3	GER; 1	GER; 1	AUT; 5	AUT; 1	JPN; Ret	JPN; 4	FRA; 12	FRA; C	POR; 1	POR; 2	AUS; 11	AUS; 10	**NZL**; 5	**NZL**; DNS									3rd	91.5
1990	Ducati	SPA; 11	SPA; Ret	GBR; 8	GBR; Ret	HUN; Ret	HUN; 9	GER; Ret	GER; Ret	CAN; Ret	CAN; Ret	USA; 13	USA; Ret	AUT; Ret	AUT; Ret	JPN	JPN	FRA; DNS	FRA; DNS	ITA; Ret	ITA; DNS	MAL	MAL	AUS	AUS	NZL	NZL	26th	23
1991	Ducati	GBR	GBR	SPA	SPA	CAN	CAN	USA	USA	AUT; 5	AUT; 6	SMR; 3	SMR; 5	SWE	SWE	JPN; 9	JPN; 10	MAL; 3	MAL; 6	GER; 3	GER; 8	FRA	FRA	ITA; DNS	ITA; DNS	AUS	AUS	10th	108
