= Bimota =

Italian motorcycle manufacturer

Bimota SpA

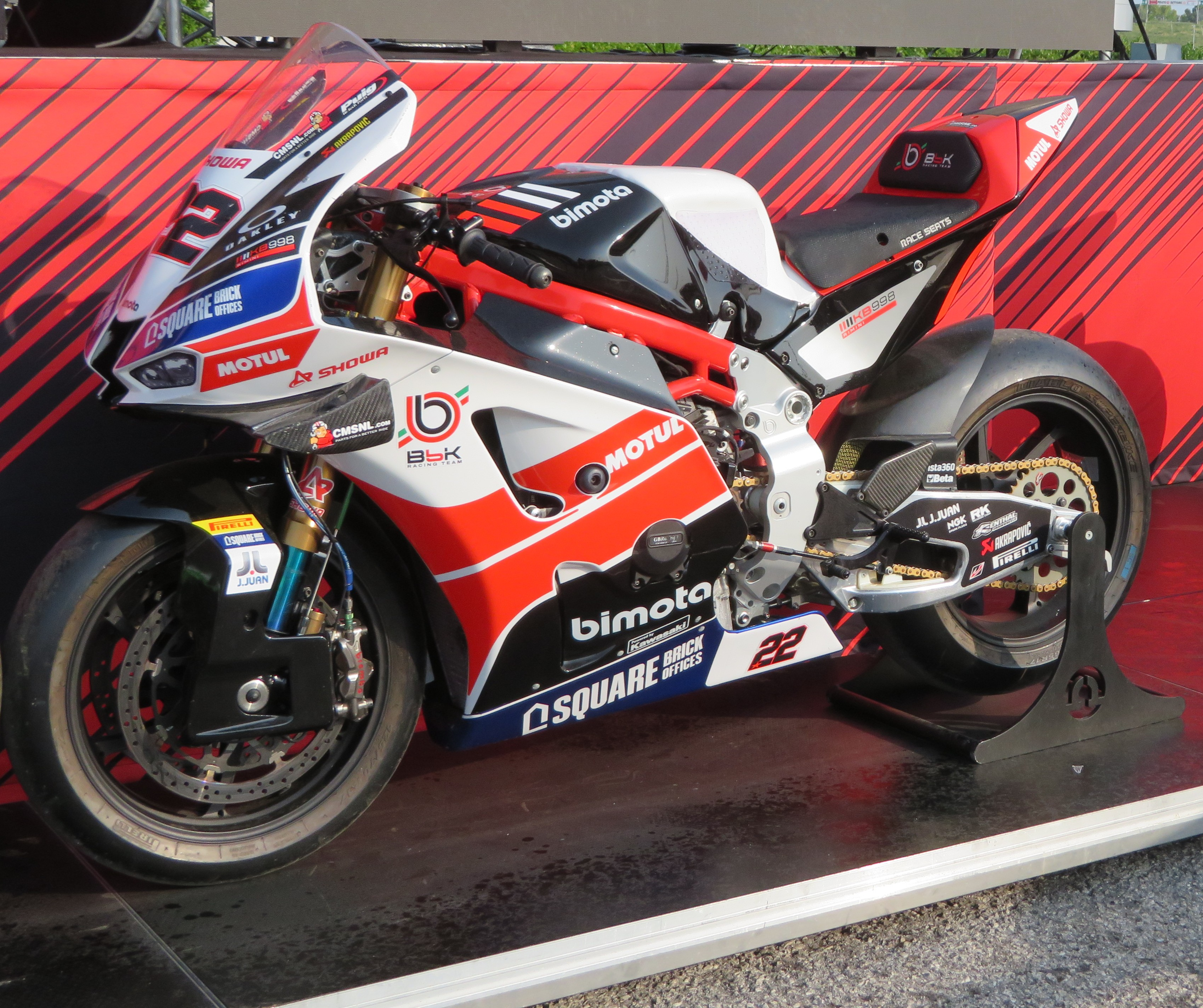
- 2025 Bimota KB998
- Type: Private
- Industry: Motorcycle manufacturing
- Founded: 1973; 53 years ago in Rimini, Italy
- Founder: Valerio Bianchi; Giuseppe Morri; Massimo Tamburini
- Headquarters: Rimini, Italy
- Area served: Worldwide
- Products: Motorcycles
- Parent: B and Motion S.A. (50.1%); Kawasaki Motors Europe (49.9%)
- Website: bimota.it

Bimota is an Italian manufacturer of custom and production motorcycles. It was founded in 1973 in Rimini by Valerio Bianchi, Giuseppe Morri, and Massimo Tamburini. The company name is a portmanteau derived from the first two letters of each of the three founders' surnames: Bianchi, Morri, and Tamburini.

== Products ==
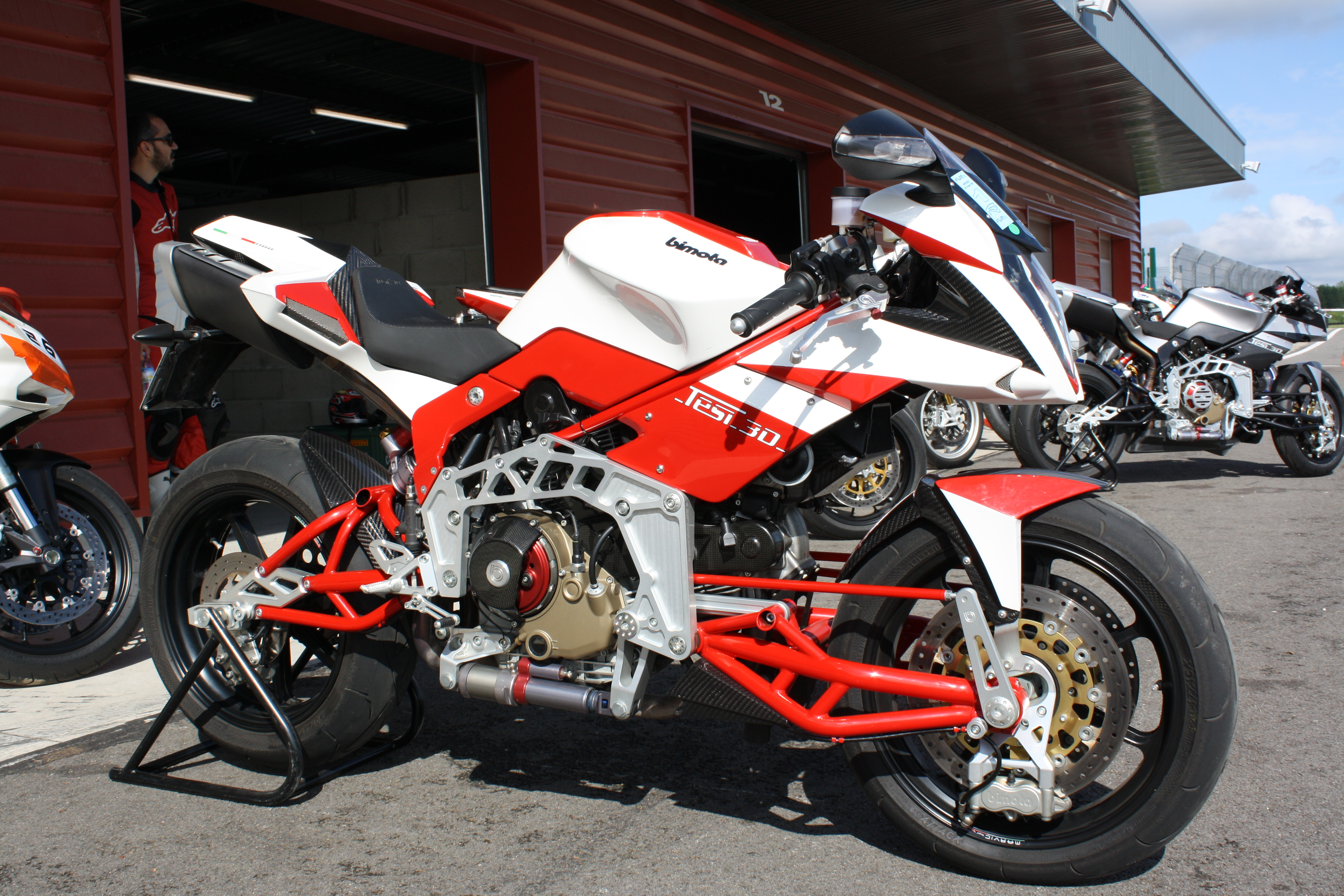
Bimota Tesi 3D

Because the state of frame design was stagnant in the 1970s, Bimota concentrated initially on building high-quality motorcycle chassis around existing engines. From the beginning they customised the top models of Suzuki, Honda and Kawasaki. During the late 1970s, Bimota also helped develop and build motorcycles branded as Lamborghinis. In the 1980s they also customised Yamaha and Ducati motorcycles.

Bimota's co-founder and long-time chief designer Tamburini has been an influential player in the development of other Italian brands, most significantly his work on the popular Ducati 916, the Ducati Paso, and the MV Agusta F4; other designers such as Bimota chief Sergio Robbiano have also been involved with larger-volume manufacturers.

More recent Bimota models included the DB5, DB6, DB7, DB9 and the Tesi, with a DB8 featuring the Ducati 1198 engine. The Tesi 3D was especially unusual, which, along with the co-designed Vyrus, was the only motorcycle then in production to use hub-center steering.

== Racing ==
Bimota first experienced international racing success in 1980 when privateer Jon Ekerold won the 350cc world championship on a Yamaha-powered Bimota. They also experienced success in the early years of the Superbike World Championship. Virginio Ferrari won the 1987 Formula TT title aboard a YB4 EI, partnering with Davide Tardozzi. Tardozzi won five races in the inaugural 1988 world superbike championship, more than any other competitor, but inconsistent results relegated him to third place in the final standings.

After many years without success, Australian rider Anthony Gobert caused a major shock in 2000 by winning a wet race at Philip Island on a Bimota SB8K. The Alstare team entered a Bimota BB3 package into World Superbikes in 2014 for riders Ayrton Badovini and Christian Iddon, however, the bike initially did not have enough units in production to pass the championship's homologation rules. As a compromise, the bikes were allowed to enter from round 2, but ineligible for points until homologation was achieved. At the end of the year, the team finished unclassified and disqualified.

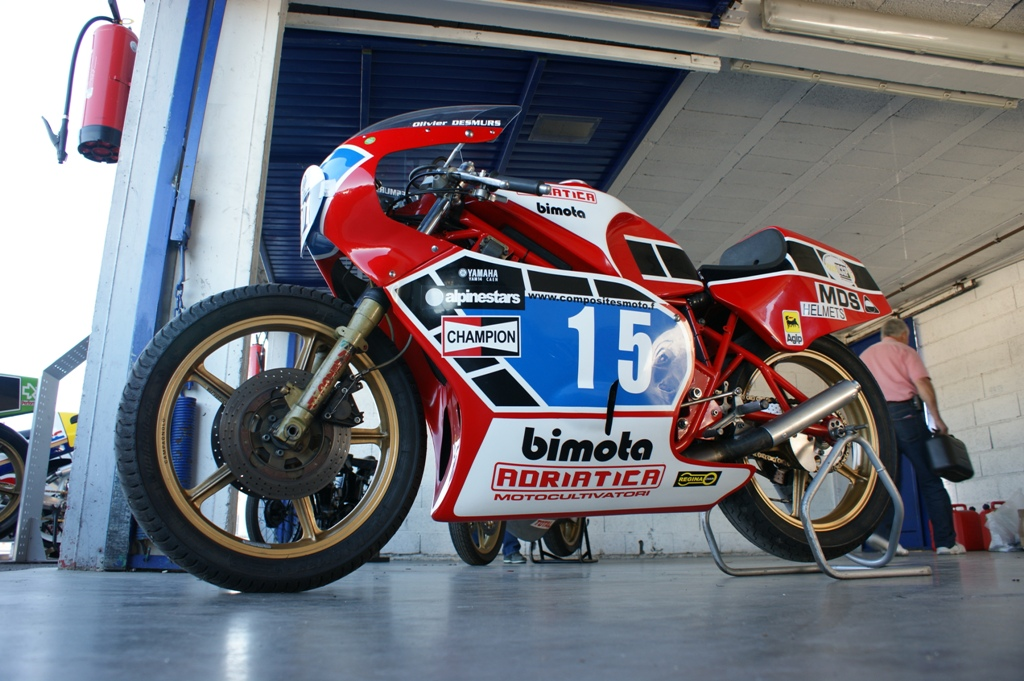
Bimota YB3

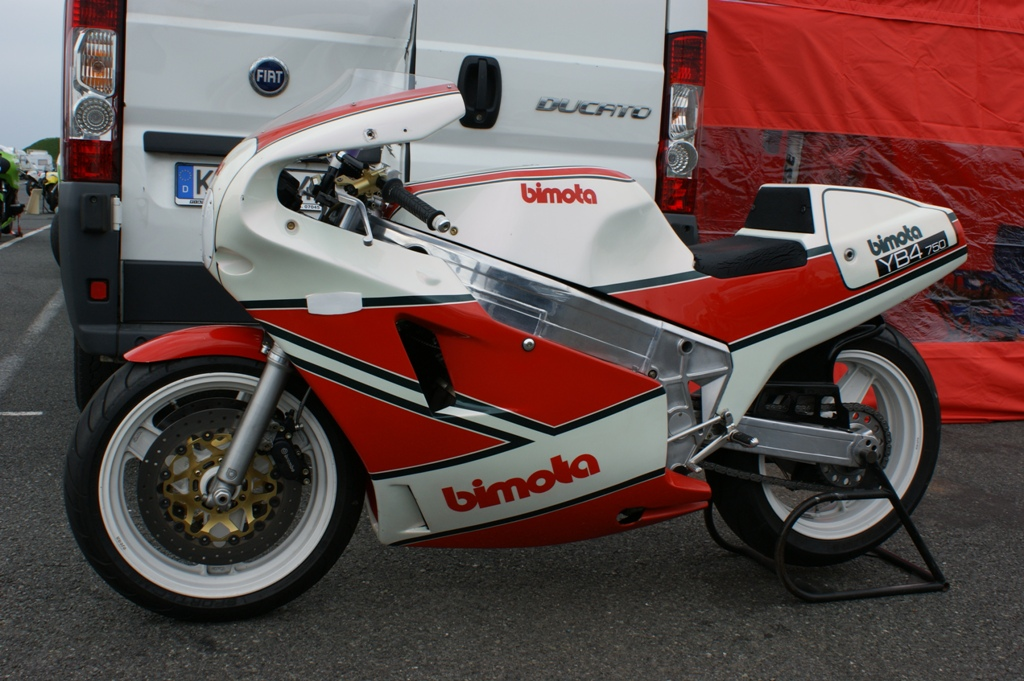
Bimota YB4

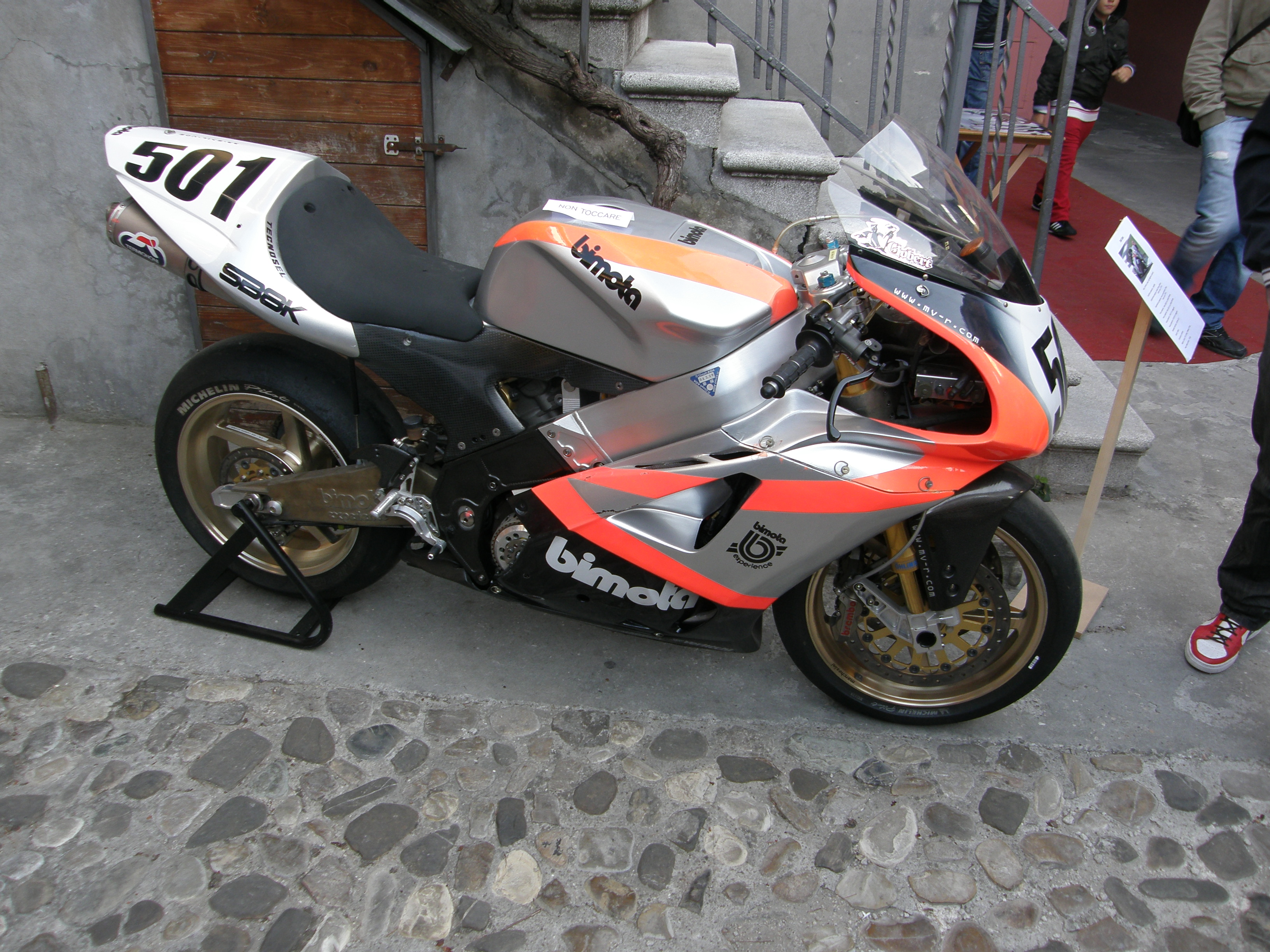
Bimota SB8K of Anthony Gobert

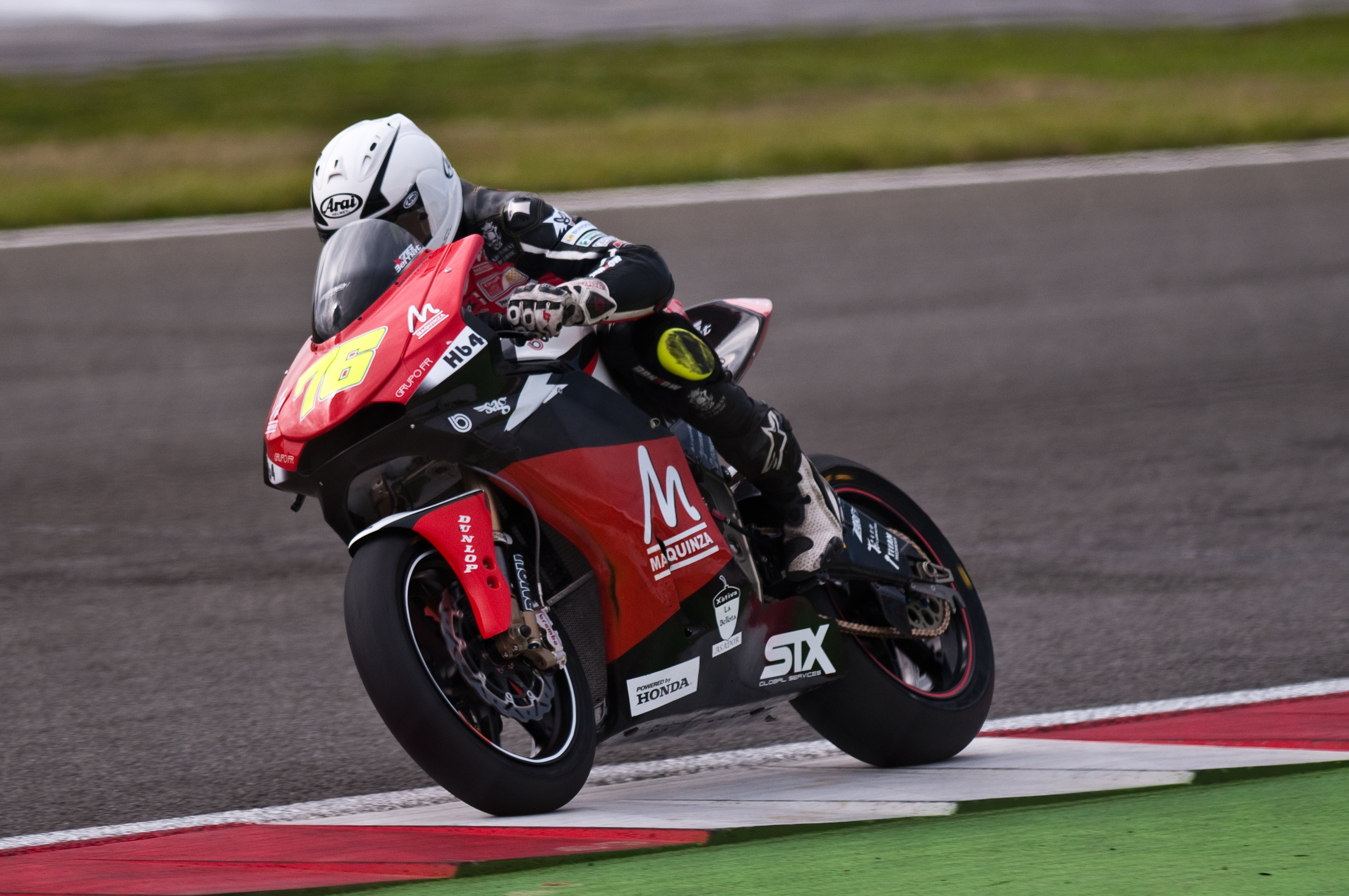
Bernat Martínez on Bimota HB4 at the 2010 British motorcycle Grand Prix

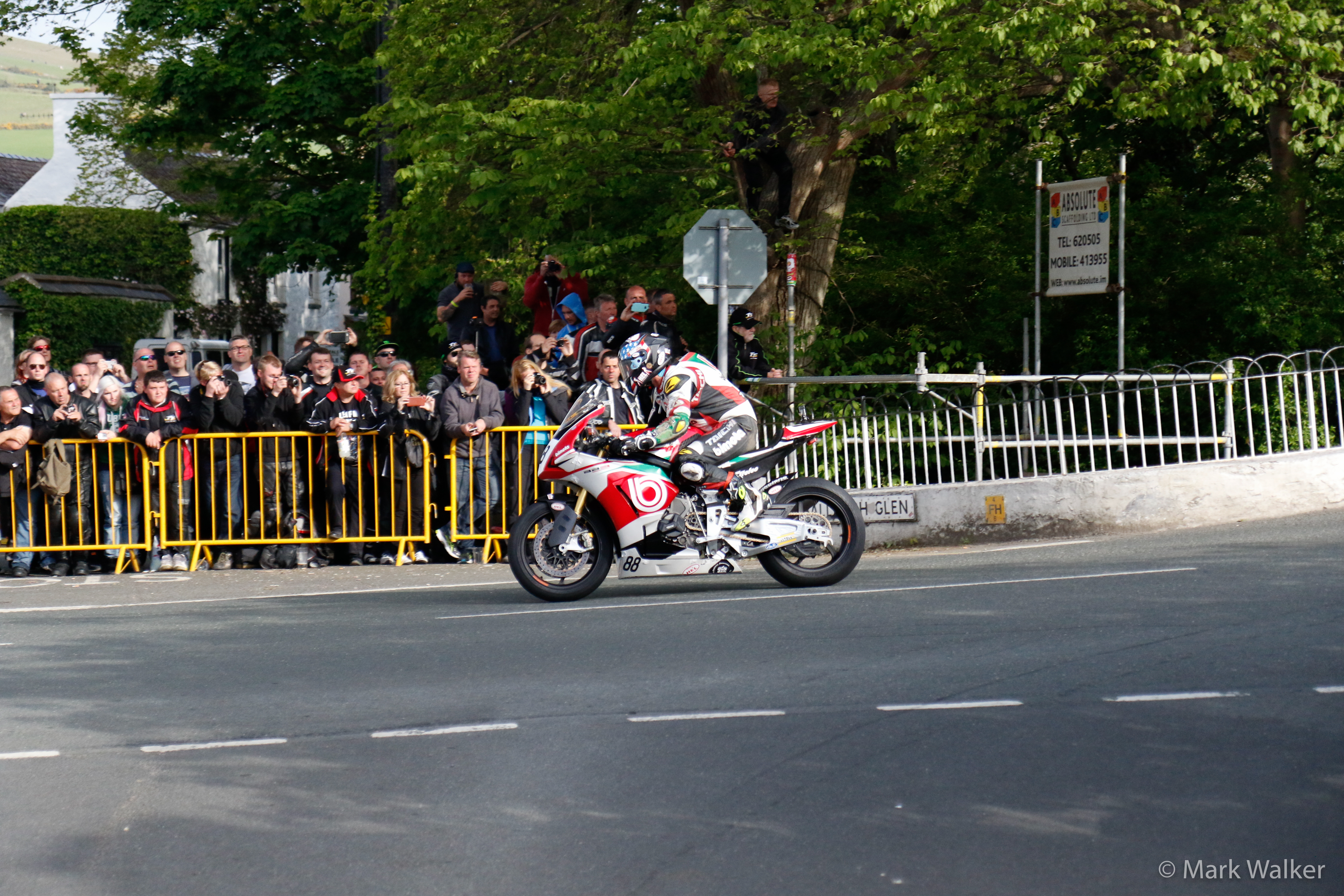
Brandon Cretu on Bimota BB3 at the 2015 Senior TT

== Bankruptcy and rebirth ==
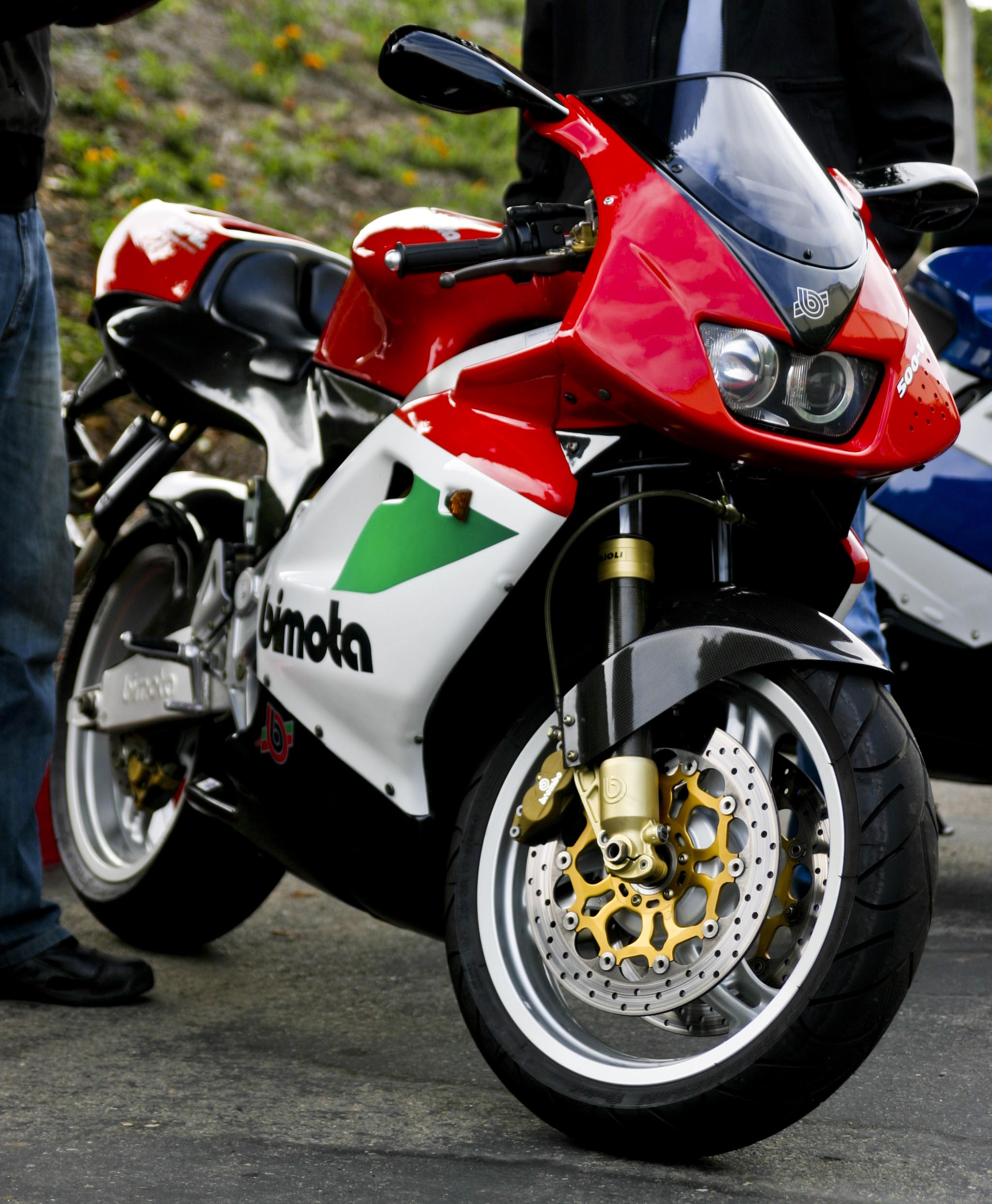
Bimota V Due

The V Due, introduced in 1997, had a design flaw with its engine. Bimota was forced to abandon the novel fuel injection system and re-engineer the entire engine. Bimota ultimately recalled the entire run of the V Due, and made an improved version, the 'Evoluzione'. Only 340 original V Dues and 21 Evoluziones were built. While this was occurring, during the 2000 World Superbike season, one of Bimota's main sponsors disappeared, owing the company a great deal of money. The combination of events forced Bimota to file for bankruptcy and close their doors.

In 2003, new owners of the marque assets, Lorenzo Ducati and Giuseppi Della Pietra, formed Alternativa Moto, with the intention to manufacture all-Italian machines using Ducati engines, and sold the V-Due rights to Win-Win.

A new group of investors purchased the rights to the Bimota name and designs and restarted the company. The investors that bought Bimota, Marco Chiancianesi who is the president and his business partner Daniele Longoni are both active Scientologists.

Recent reports paint a less optimistic picture for the future of Bimota. In 2017, the factory at Rimini had reportedly closed, with spares and incomplete bikes mothballed elsewhere, possibly in Switzerland.

In October 2019, Kawasaki Heavy Industries purchased a 49% stake in the company, and soon after announced an intention to manufacture Bimota bikes using parts from the Kawasaki supply chain.

== Return to motorsports racing ==
After exclusively running their own teams known as Kawasaki Racing Team (KRT), from 2025 Kawasaki entered into a partnership with Bimota – as a producer of motorcycle chassis – to be known as Bimota by Kawasaki Racing Team (BbKRT). Their 2025 World Superbike entry, designated Bimota KB998 Rimini and finished in red, white and black instead of Kawasaki green, uses ZX-10 Ninja powertrain, as in earlier seasons.

=== Bimota by Kawasaki Racing Team ===
Bimota by Kawasaki Racing Team
- 2025 name: Bimota by Kawasaki Racing Team
- Base: Rimini, Italy
- Team principal/s: Guim Roda; Team Manager
- Race riders: 22 (United Kingdom) Alex Lowes; 47 (Italy) Axel Bassani
- Motorcycle: Bimota KB998 (2025–)
- Tyres: Pirelli

=== World Superbike results ===
(key) (Races in bold indicate pole position; races in italics indicate fastest lap)

Year	Class	Bike	Team	Tyres	No.	Riders	1			2			3			4			5			6			7			8			9			10			11			12			RC	Points	TC	Points	MC	Points
Year	Class	Bike	Team	Tyres	No.	Riders	R1	SR	R2	R1	SR	R2	R1	SR	R2	R1	SR	R2	R1	SR	R2	R1	SR	R2	R1	SR	R2	R1	SR	R2	R1	SR	R2	R1	SR	R2	R1	SR	R2	R1	SR	R2	RC	Points	TC	Points	MC	Points
2025	WSBK	KB998	Bimota by Kawasaki Racing Team	**P**	22	(United Kingdom) Alex Lowes	AUS; 8	AUS; 7	AUS; 8	POR; Ret	POR; 13	POR; Ret	NED; 11	NED; 11	NED; 6	ITA; 11	ITA; 12	ITA; 11	CZE; 4	CZE; 7	CZE; 15	EMI; 4	EMI; 2	EMI; 14	GBR; Ret	GBR; DNS	GBR; DNS	HUN; 6	HUN; 12	HUN; 6	FRA; 3	FRA; 3	FRA; 3	ARA; 5	ARA; 6	ARA; 6	POR; 5	POR; 15	POR; 4	SPA; 6	SPA; 5	SPA; 6	6th	218	5th	358	4th	254
2025	WSBK	KB998	Bimota by Kawasaki Racing Team	**P**	47	(Italy) Axel Bassani	AUS; 9	AUS; 9	AUS; 10	POR; 9	POR; 11	POR; 7	NED; Ret	NED; 12	NED; 5	ITA; 9	ITA; 18	ITA; 15	CZE; 12	CZE; 18	CZE; 6	EMI; Ret	EMI; Ret	EMI; 12	GBR; 16	GBR; 14	GBR; 16	HUN; 10	HUN; 6	HUN; 9	FRA; 7	FRA; 8	FRA; 12	ARA; 8	ARA; 11	ARA; 9	POR; 11	POR; 8	POR; 8	SPA; 11	SPA; 10	SPA; 10	10th	140	5th	358	4th	254
2026	WSBK	KB998	Bimota by Kawasaki Racing Team	**P**	22	(United Kingdom) Alex Lowes	AUS; 7	AUS; 3	AUS; Ret	POR; 4	POR; 4	POR; 4	NED; 5	NED; 5	NED; 11	HUN; 6	HUN; 7	HUN; Ret	CZE; 7	CZE; 9	CZE; 7	ARA; 4	ARA; 5	ARA; 4	EMI; 5	EMI; Ret	EMI; 4	GBR; 7	GBR; 4	GBR; 5	FRA; 5	FRA; 5	FRA; 13	ITA; 6	ITA; 6	ITA; 5	POR; 5	POR; 11	POR; Ret	SPA; 8	SPA; 5	SPA; 7	5th	259	3rd	481	2nd	316
2026	WSBK	KB998	Bimota by Kawasaki Racing Team	**P**	47	(Italy) Axel Bassani	AUS; 4	AUS; 2	AUS; 2	POR; 8	POR; 8	POR; 8	NED; 12	NED; 18	NED; 13	HUN; 17	HUN; 15	HUN; Ret	CZE; 5	CZE; 13	CZE; 8	ARA; 8	ARA; 6	ARA; 5	EMI; 4	EMI; 4	EMI; Ret	GBR; 9	GBR; 5	GBR; 4	FRA; 7	FRA; 11	FRA; 9	ITA; 8	ITA; 16	ITA; 9	POR; 7	POR; 6	POR; 5	SPA; 10	SPA; 12	SPA; 8	7th	222	3rd	481	2nd	316

* Season still in progress.

== Current Models ==
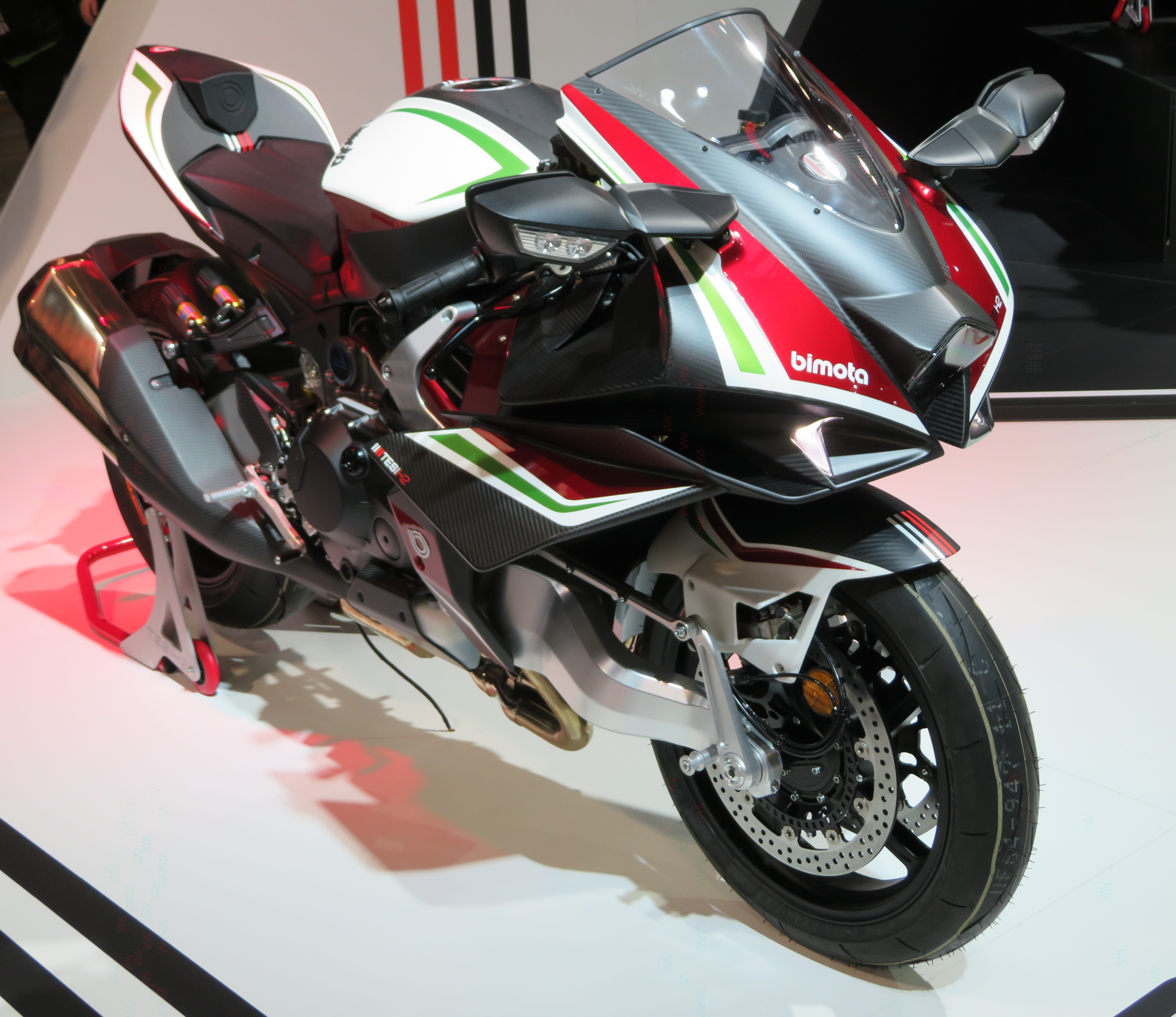
Bimota Tesi H2 (2020)

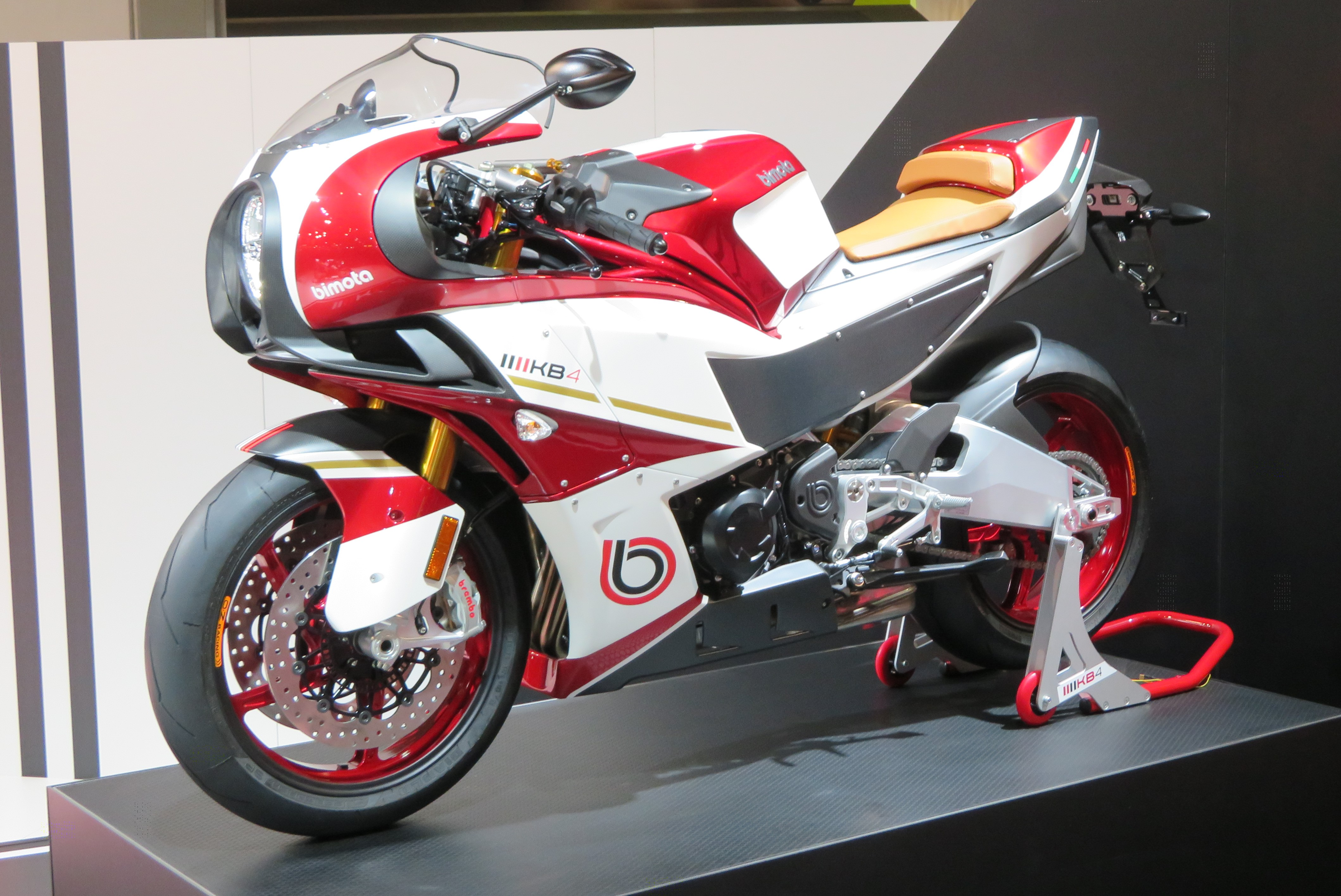
Bimota KB4 (2022)

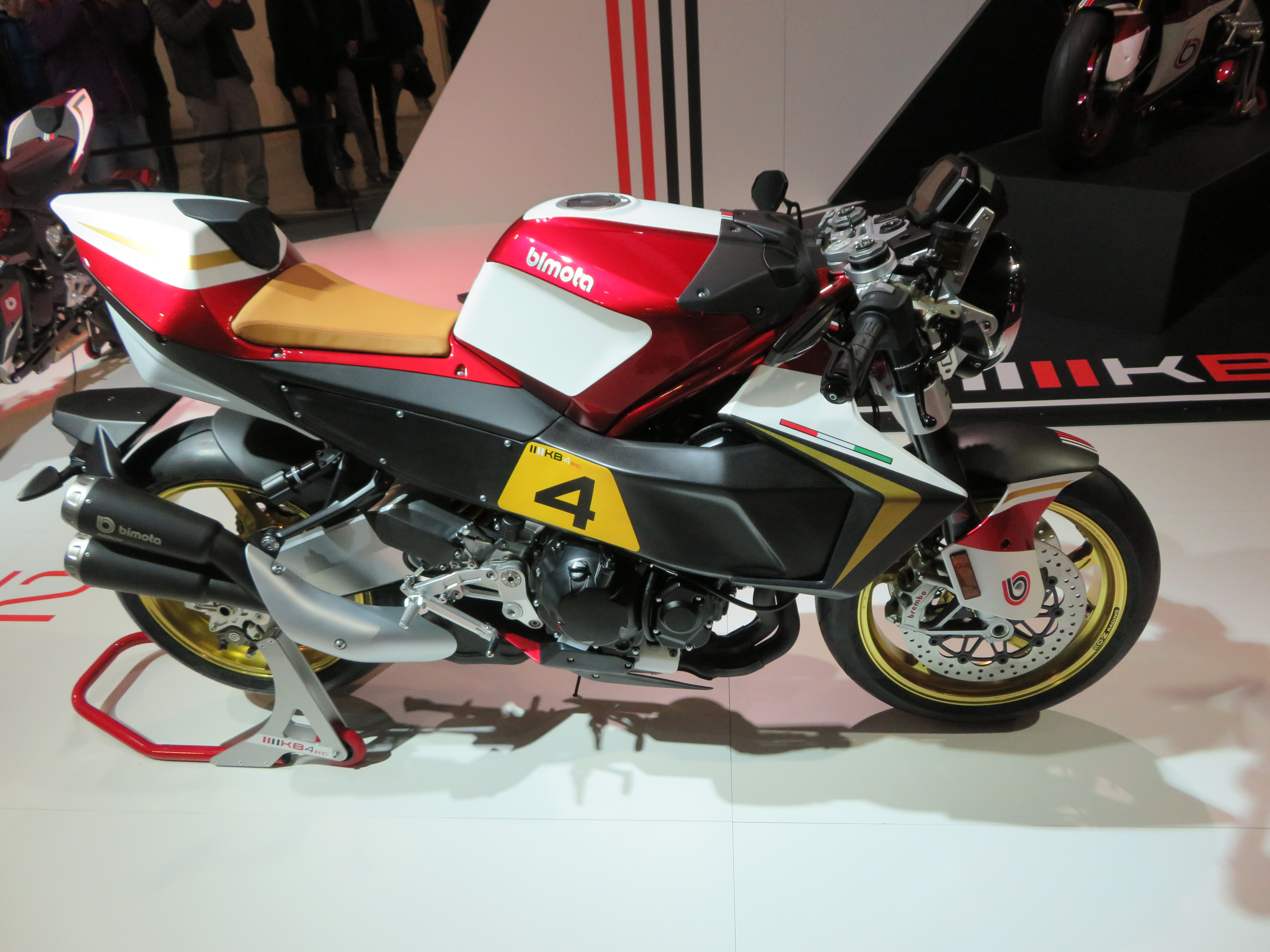
Bimota KB4 RC (2022)

- Bimota KB399
- Bimota KB998 Rimini
- Bimota Tesi H2
- Bimota Tesi H2 Tera
- Bimota BX450
- Bimota KB4
- Bimota KB4 RC

== See also ==
- Bimota V Due
- Bimota BB3
- Bimota DB1
- List of Italian companies
- List of motorcycle manufacturers
