= Bubba Shobert =

American motorcycle racer

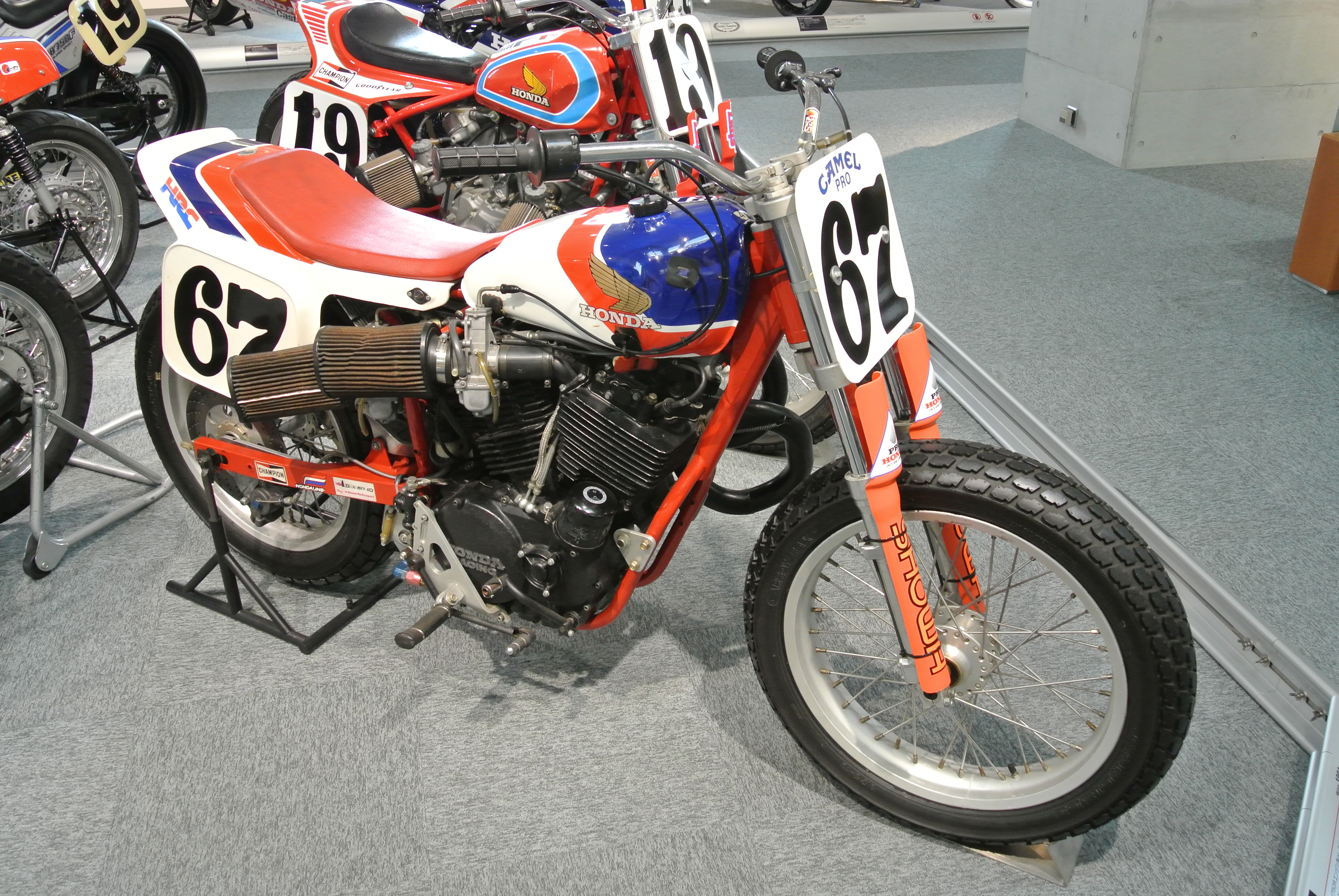
- Nationality: (United States) American
- Born: January 29, 1962 (age 64); Lubbock, Texas, U.S.
Motorcycle racing career statistics
Grand Prix motorcycle racing
Active years	1988 - 1989
First race	1988 250cc United States Grand Prix
Last race	1989 500cc United States Grand Prix
Team	Honda
Championships	0
Starts / Wins / Podiums / Poles / F. laps / Points; 4 / 0 / 0 / 0 / 0 / 23

Don Wayne "Bubba" Shobert (born January 29, 1962, in Lubbock, Texas) is an American former professional motorcycle racer. He was a three-time A.M.A. Grand National Champion from 1985 to 1987 and was AMA Superbike Champion in 1988 while riding for American Honda.

In 1989, Shobert moved to the Grand Prix world championship riding for Honda. Shobert's Grand Prix career was cut short at the third race of the season, where he was involved in a terrible crash with Kevin Magee on the cool off lap after the race, wherein Shobert drove into the back of Magee's motorcycle. Magee had stopped in the middle of the track and was performing a rear-wheel "burnout". Eddie Lawson narrowly missed hitting Magee's bike after he and Shobert had just finished congratulating each other moments earlier and were not looking forward. Shobert suffered severe head injuries but was able to recover after months of rehabilitation. He never raced again, instead taking roles as manager in some teams of AMA Grand National dirt track .

Shobert was inducted into the Motorcycle Hall of Fame in 1998.

Shobert was inducted into the Motorsports Hall of Fame of America in 2007.

Preceded by Wayne Rainey	AMA Superbike Champion; 1988	Succeeded by Jamie James
