= 2004 British Superbike Championship =

British motorcycle racing season

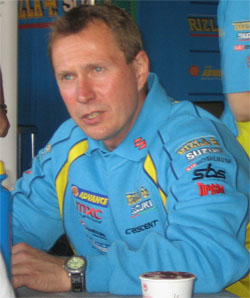
2004 champion, John Reynolds

The 2004 British Superbike season was the 17th British Superbike Championship season. Shane Byrne was the reigning champion but he left the series to race in MotoGP.

John Reynolds took his third and final championship for Rizla Suzuki after starting the season with a run of 11 consecutive podium finishes. Michael Rutter, riding for HM Plant Honda, also started the season strong, but a mid-season slump saw him finish 29 points behind in 2nd. Reynolds' teammate, Yukio Kagayama finished the season 3rd.

The Superbike Cup for Privateer entries was dominated by James Ellison who finished 133 points clear of nearest challenger Jon Kirkham.

== Calendar ==
2004 Calendar
Round		Circuit	Date	Pole position	Fastest lap	Winning rider	Winning team	Ref
1	R1	(England) Silverstone International	28 March	(England) Michael Rutter	(England) Michael Rutter	(England) Michael Rutter	HM Plant Honda	
1	R2	(England) Silverstone International	28 March	(England) Michael Rutter	(England) Michael Rutter	(England) John Reynolds	Rizla Suzuki	
2	R1	(England) Brands Hatch Indy	12 April	(England) Sean Emmett	(England) John Reynolds	(England) John Reynolds	Rizla Suzuki	
2	R2	(England) Brands Hatch Indy	12 April	(England) Sean Emmett	(England) Michael Rutter	(England) Sean Emmett	MonsterMob Ducati	
3	R1	(England) Snetterton	25 April	(England) Michael Rutter	(England) John Reynolds	(Japan) Yukio Kagayama	Rizla Suzuki	
3	R2	(England) Snetterton	25 April	(England) Michael Rutter	(England) Michael Rutter	(England) John Reynolds	Rizla Suzuki	
4	R1	(England) Oulton Park	3 May	(England) John Reynolds	(Japan) Yukio Kagayama	(Japan) Yukio Kagayama	Rizla Suzuki	
4	R2	(England) Oulton Park	3 May	(England) John Reynolds	(England) Michael Rutter	(Japan) Yukio Kagayama	Rizla Suzuki	
5	R1	(Republic of Ireland) Mondello Park	23 May	(England) Michael Rutter	(England) John Reynolds	(England) Scott Smart	Hawk Kawasaki	
5	R2	(Republic of Ireland) Mondello Park	23 May	(England) Michael Rutter	(England) John Reynolds	(England) Michael Rutter	HM Plant Honda	
6	R1	(England) Thruxton	6 June	(Australia) Dean Thomas	(England) Sean Emmett	(England) Michael Rutter	HM Plant Honda	
6	R2	(England) Thruxton	6 June	(Australia) Dean Thomas	(England) Michael Rutter	(England) Sean Emmett	MonsterMob Ducati	
7	R1	(England) Brands Hatch GP	20 June	(Japan) Yukio Kagayama	(England) John Reynolds	(England) John Reynolds	Rizla Suzuki	
7	R2	(England) Brands Hatch GP	20 June	(Japan) Yukio Kagayama	(England) John Reynolds	(England) Leon Haslam	Team Renegade Ducati	
8	R1	(Scotland) Knockhill	4 July	(England) John Reynolds	(Japan) Yukio Kagayama	(England) Scott Smart	Hawk Kawasaki	
8	R2	(Scotland) Knockhill	4 July	(England) John Reynolds	(England) Sean Emmett	(England) James Haydon	Virgin Mobile Yamaha	
9	R1	(England) Mallory Park	18 July	(England) Scott Smart	(Japan) Yukio Kagayama	(England) John Reynolds	Rizla Suzuki	
9	R2	(England) Mallory Park	18 July	(England) Scott Smart	(Japan) Ryuichi Kiyonari	(England) Scott Smart	Hawk Kawasaki	
10	R1	(England) Croft	15 August	(Japan) Yukio Kagayama	(England) Michael Rutter	(England) Michael Rutter	HM Plant Honda	
10	R2	(England) Croft	15 August	(Japan) Yukio Kagayama	(England) John Reynolds	(England) Michael Rutter	HM Plant Honda	
11	R1	(England) Cadwell Park	30 August	(England) Scott Smart	(Japan) Yukio Kagayama	(England) Michael Rutter	HM Plant Honda	
11	R2	(England) Cadwell Park	30 August	(England) Scott Smart	(Japan) Yukio Kagayama	(Japan) Yukio Kagayama	Rizla Suzuki	
12	R1	(England) Oulton Park	12 September	(England) Michael Rutter	(England) Sean Emmett	(England) John Reynolds	Rizla Suzuki	
12	R2	(England) Oulton Park	12 September	(England) Michael Rutter	(Japan) Yukio Kagayama	(England) Michael Rutter	HM Plant Honda	
13	R1	(England) Donington Park	19 September	(Japan) Ryuichi Kiyonari	(Japan) Ryuichi Kiyonari	(Japan) Ryuichi Kiyonari	HM Plant Honda	
13	R2	(England) Donington Park	19 September	(Japan) Ryuichi Kiyonari	(England) Michael Rutter	(Japan) Ryuichi Kiyonari	HM Plant Honda	

== Entry list ==
2004 Entry List
Team	Bike	No	Riders	Class	Rounds
Rizla Suzuki	Suzuki GSX-R1000	2	(England) John Reynolds		All
Rizla Suzuki	Suzuki GSX-R1000	71	(Japan) Yukio Kagayama		1–5, 7–13
Rizla Suzuki	Suzuki GSX-R1000	71	(Spain) Gregorio Lavilla		6
HM Plant Honda	Honda CBR1000RR	3	(England) Michael Rutter		All
HM Plant Honda	Honda CBR1000RR	23	(Japan) Ryuichi Kiyonari		All
Virgin Mobile Samsung	Yamaha YZF-R1	4	(England) Steve Plater		1–4, 9–13
Virgin Mobile Samsung	Yamaha YZF-R1	6	(England) Gary Mason		All
Virgin Mobile Samsung	Yamaha YZF-R1	8	(England) Tommy Hill		All
Virgin Mobile Samsung	Yamaha YZF-R1	36	(England) James Haydon		5–13
MonsterMob Ducati	Ducati 999 F04	5	(England) Sean Emmett		All
Team Vitrans	Honda CBR1000RR	9	(Australia) Craig Coxhell		All
ETI Racing	Ducati 998 F02	10	(Scotland) Stuart Easton		1, 4–6
ETI Racing	Ducati 998 F02	10	(Scotland) Iain MacPherson		7–9
ETI Racing	Ducati 998 F02	19	(England) James Haydon		3
ETI Racing	Ducati 998 F02	34	(England) Paul Brown		10–13
Suregas Racing	Ducati 998RS	11	(England) Malcolm Ashley	C	1–5, 7, 9
Sendo Ducati Dienza	Ducati 998 F02	12	(Australia) Dean Thomas		All
Sendo Ducati Dienza	Ducati 998 F02	52	(England) Dean Ellison		1
Medd Racing	Ducati 999RS	14	(England) Nick Medd	C	1–4, 7, 10–13
Sovereign Engineering	Suzuki GSX-R1000	15	(England) Sam Corke	C	1–9, 11
Jon Kirkham Racing	Suzuki GSX-R1000	16	(England) Jon Kirkham	C	All
Jentin Racing	Yamaha YZF-R1	17	(England) James Ellison	C	All
Darrennthomasracing.com	Suzuki GSX-R1000	18	(England) Darren Thomas	C	1–2
BTS Racing	Suzuki GSX-R1000	20	(Northern Ireland) Stephen Thompson	C	5
BTS Racing	Suzuki GSX-R1000	86	(Australia) Cameron Donald	C	5–6
Ipone MP Ducati Racing	Ducati 998RS	21	(England) Michael Pensavalle	C	9, 11–13
KP Racing	Suzuki GSX-R1000	22	(England) Denver Robb	C	1–2, 4–5, 7–8, 10
Hobbs Racing	Suzuki GSX-R1000	25	(England) Dennis Hobbs	C	1–11
Carmasters Racing	Suzuki GSX-R1000	26	(England) Chris Martin	C	All
Thunderchild Racing	Ducati 998RS	27	(England) Vince Whittle	C	1–3
Thunderchild/Zakspeed	Suzuki GSX-R1000	27	(England) Zak Barry	C	12
Travel City Direct	Suzuki GSX-R1000	28	(Wales) Paul Jones	C	1–4
Phase One Endurance	Yamaha YZF-R1	30	(Belgium) Stéphane Mertens		13
Phase One Endurance	Yamaha YZF-R1	31	(England) Henry Fincher		13
Nutttravel.com Racing	Yamaha YZF-R1	38	(Northern Ireland) Marty Nutt	C	1, 12–13
BMR Racing	Kawasaki ZX-10R	39	(England) Warren Scott	C	2–4
BMR Racing	Kawasaki ZX-10R	39	(England) Chris Platt	C	5
BMR Racing	Kawasaki ZX-10R	97	(England) Chris Platt	C	6–13
Team Renegade Ducati	Ducati 999RS	41	(Japan) Noriyuki Haga		4, 7
Team Renegade Ducati	Ducati 999RS	91	(England) Leon Haslam		4, 7
PR Branson Honda	Honda CBR1000RR	43	(England) Kiel Bryce	C	4, 6–10
PR Branson Honda	Honda CBR1000RR	68	(England) Gordon Blackley	C	1–2
PR Branson Honda	Honda CBR1000RR	68	(England) Francis Williamson	C	3
PR Branson Honda	Honda CBR1000RR	68	(England) Howie Mainwaring	C	12–13
Hawk Kawasaki	Kawasaki ZX-10R	44	(England) John McGuinness		10–13
Hawk Kawasaki	Kawasaki ZX-10R	75	(England) John McGuinness		7–9
Hawk Kawasaki	Kawasaki ZX-10R	75	(Australia) Glen Richards		1–6, 10–13
Hawk Kawasaki	Kawasaki ZX-10R	88	(England) Scott Smart		All
Superbike Direct	Suzuki GSX-R1000	48	(Republic of Ireland) Derek Shiels	C	5
Rothwell Motorsports	Yamaha YZF-R1	50	(England) Steve Brogan	C	5–9, 11–12
RBSD/Performance Bikes	Suzuki GSX-R1000	54	(England) Dijon Compton	C	1–6
RBSD/Performance Bikes	Suzuki GSX-R1000	54	(England) Gus Scott	C	7, 9–13
Quay Garage Suzuki	Suzuki GSX-R1000	56	(England) James Buckingham	C	All
Bike Magazine/fwr.co.uk	Suzuki GSX-R1000	61	(England) Adam Hitchcox	C	1–7
McKenny Racing	Suzuki GSX-R1000	68	(Republic of Ireland) Declan Swanton	C	5
B&M Racing Ireland	Honda CBR1000RR	72	(Republic of Ireland) Derek Wilson	C	5
Team Colin Appleyard	Yamaha YZF-R1	74	(England) Kieran Clarke		1–9, 11–13

Icon	Class
C	Privateers Cup

Key
Regular Rider
Wildcard Rider
Replacement Rider

== Championship Standings ==
Points system
Position	1st	2nd	3rd	4th	5th	6th	7th	8th	9th	10th	11th	12th	13th	14th	15th
Race	25	20	16	13	11	10	9	8	7	6	5	4	3	2	1

Pos	Rider	Bike	SIL (England)		BHI (England)		SNE (England)		OUL (England)		MOP (Republic of Ireland)		THR (England)		BHGP (England)		KNO (Scotland)		MAL (England)		CRO (England)		CAD (England)		OUL (England)		DON (England)		Pts
Pos	Rider	Bike	R1	R2	R1	R2	R1	R2	R1	R2	R1	R2	R1	R2	R1	R2	R1	R2	R1	R2	R1	R2	R1	R2	R1	R2	R1	R2	Pts
1	(England) John Reynolds	Suzuki	3	1	1 ^{FL}	3	2 ^{FL}	1	2 ^{P}	2 ^{P}	2 ^{FL}	2 ^{FL}	2	Ret	1 ^{FL}	7 ^{FL}	4 ^{P}	3 ^{P}	1	2	5	3 ^{FL}	Ret	8	1	1	3	6	446
2	(England) Michael Rutter	Honda	1 ^{P FL}	3 ^{P FL}	2	2 ^{FL}	3 ^{P}	2 ^{P FL}	3	3 ^{FL}	20 ^{P}	1 ^{P}	1	2 ^{FL}	5	14	9	4	6	Ret	1 ^{FL}	1	1	Ret	2 ^{P}	2 ^{P}	2	2 ^{FL}	417
3	(Japan) Yukio Kagayama	Suzuki	4	Ret	3	5	1	4	1 ^{FL}	1	4	5			4 ^{P}	3 ^{P}	3 ^{FL}	5	2 ^{FL}	15	2 ^{P}	Ret ^{P}	3 ^{FL}	1 ^{FL}	3	3 ^{FL}	14	5	335
4	(England) Scott Smart	Kawasaki	7	5	4	4	5	6	5	5	1	3	6	4	Ret	5	1	6	3 ^{P}	1 ^{P}	3	2	20 ^{P}	2 ^{P}	8	Ret	4	4	330
5	(England) Sean Emmett	Ducati	5	4	Ret ^{P}	1 ^{P}	4	3	8	Ret	6	7	3 ^{FL}	1	2	2	Ret	2 ^{FL}	7	5	7	11	10	3	4 ^{FL}	4	5	3	315
6	(Japan) Ryuichi Kiyonari	Honda	2	2	6	6	7	9	WD	WD			13	8	18	20	10	14	4	3 ^{FL}	4	4	2	16	12	6	1 ^{P FL}	1 ^{P}	234
7	(Australia) Dean Thomas	Ducati	8	6	Ret	8	6	5	4	4	5	Ret	5 ^{P}	Ret ^{P}	10	Ret	Ret	9	8	8	8	Ret	6	4	7	5	7	7	193
8	(England) James Haydon	Ducati					10	14																					181
8	(England) James Haydon	Yamaha									9	12	Ret	Ret	8	6	2	1	5	4	6	5	4	6	14	8	8	8	181
9	(England) Tommy Hill	Yamaha	14	10	9	10	8	10	9	14	Ret	6	9	6	7	8	Ret	Ret	Ret	6	9	Ret	5	Ret	9	10	10	14	137
10	(Australia) Glen Richards	Kawasaki	9	Ret	Ret	7	9	7	6	9	3	4	Ret	DNS							WD	WD	7	5	6	9	6	Ret	125
11	(England) Gary Mason	Yamaha	Ret	8	5	9	Ret	11	7	7	Ret	Ret	7	Ret	Ret	10	6	Ret	14	7	Ret	6	11	Ret	11	Ret	9	12	116
12	(England) James Ellison	Yamaha	12	15	14	18	11	12	10	8	13	Ret	8	5	15	13	7	10	15	13	11	9	14	10	15	13	11	9	111
13	(Australia) Craig Coxhell	Honda	10	12	Ret	17	Ret	13	11	11	8	9	11	9	14	9	15	8	Ret	11	13	8	Ret	13	18	12	18	15	92
14	(England) John McGuinness	Kawasaki													3	6	Ret	7	9	9	10	7	9	9	13	Ret	Ret	11	86
15	(England) Jon Kirkham	Suzuki	13	11	8	11	Ret	DNS	14	12	11	13	14	11	13	Ret	5	11	16	Ret	15	13	12	14	17	14	12	Ret	77
16	(England) Kieran Clarke	Yamaha	16	Ret	10	13	Ret	15	16	13	10	8	10	7	WD	WD	12	12	12	Ret			8	7	16	11	Ret	DNS	76
17	(England) Steve Plater	Yamaha	Ret	9	11	12	Ret	8	DNS	DNS									11	10	Ret	10	Ret	Ret	5	7	Ret	10	67
18	(England) Dennis Hobbs	Suzuki	17	13	12	14	12	16	12	Ret	12	11	17	13	11	15	14	15	10	12	14	14	DNS	DNS					52
19	(England) Leon Haslam	Ducati							Ret	6					8	1													43
20	(England) Sam Corke	Suzuki	15	Ret	7	Ret	13	18	13	Ret	14	Ret	16	14	9	12	Ret	13	17	16			16	11					39
21	(England) James Buckingham	Suzuki	18	Ret	15	15	14	17	15	15	7	10	12	10	Ret	16	16	16	18	18	16	15	Ret	Ret	19	15	15	19	34
22	(Spain) Gregorio Lavilla	Suzuki											4	3															29
23	(Scotland) Stuart Easton	Ducati	11	7					Ret	Ret	Ret	14	15	12															21
24	(England) Paul Brown	Ducati																			12	12	13	Ret	10	Ret	Ret	13	20
25	(Scotland) Iain MacPherson	Ducati													16	17	8	17	13	14									13
26	(Northern Ireland) Marty Nutt	Yamaha	6	Ret																					21	Ret	19	21	10
27	(England) Chris Platt	Kawasaki									DNQ	DNQ	21	18	12	18	11	Ret	Ret	Ret	19	17	Ret	Ret	Ret	19	Ret	22	10
28	(England) Chris Martin	Suzuki	19	17	18	Ret	15	19	17	17	16	18	20	17	Ret	19	13	Ret	DNS	DNS	17	16	15	17	20	16	13	16	8
29	(Japan) Noriyuki Haga	Ducati							Ret	10					Ret	DNS													6
30	(England) Steve Brogan	Yamaha									Ret	Ret	19	16	Ret	11	Ret	Ret	20	17			Ret	Ret	Ret	20			5
31	(England) Gus Scott	Suzuki													DNS	DNS			21	20	18	18	17	12	Ret	17	17	17	4
32	(England) Malcolm Ashley	Ducati	Ret	16	13	16	17	Ret	19	16	Ret	DNS			Ret	DNS			19	Ret									4
33	(England) Dean Ellison	Ducati	Ret	14																									2
34	(Australia) Cameron Donald	Suzuki									18	15	18	15															2
35	(Republic of Ireland) Derek Shiels	Suzuki									15	17																	1
36	(England) Michael Pensaville	Ducati																	WD	WD			18	15	Ret	Ret	20	23	1
37	(England) Denver Robb	Suzuki	Ret	Ret	DNQ	DNQ			21	22	17	16			Ret	DNS	Ret	DNS			Ret	Ret							0
38	(England) Warren Scott	Kawasaki			DNQ	DNQ	16	20	18	Ret																			0
39	(Belgium) Stéphane Mertens	Yamaha																									16	18	0
40	(Wales) Paul Jones	Suzuki	20	18	16	Ret	18	Ret	Ret	18																			0
41	(England) Adam Hitchcox	Suzuki	Ret	DNS	17	19	Ret	DNS	DNS	DNS	19	19	22	19	17	21													0
42	(England) Nick Medd	Ducati	Ret	Ret	DNQ	DNQ	Ret	Ret	DNS	DNS					Ret	DNS					Ret	Ret	19	DNS	Ret	Ret	DNQ	DNQ	0
43	(England) Vince Whittle	Ducati	DNS	DNS	Ret	DNS	DNS	DNS																					0
44	(England) Howie Mainwaring	Honda																							22	18	Ret	20	0
45	(England) Dijon Compton	Suzuki	DNQ	DNQ	DNQ	DNQ	Ret	Ret	20	19	Ret	DNS	Ret	DNS															0
46	(England) Kiel Bryce	Honda							DNQ	DNQ			23	20	20	22	Ret	Ret	22	19	Ret	DNS							0
47	(Republic of Ireland) Declan Swanton	Suzuki									Ret	DNS																	0
48	(England) Gordon Blackley	Honda	DNQ	DNQ	DNQ	DNQ																							0
49	(England) Darren Thomas	Suzuki	DNQ	DNQ	DNQ	DNQ																							0
50	(England) Francis Williamson	Honda					DNQ	DNQ																					0
51	(Republic of Ireland) Derek Wilson	Honda									DNQ	DNQ																	0
52	(England) Zak Berry	Suzuki																							DNQ	DNQ			0
53	(England) Henry Fincher	Yamaha																									DNQ	DNQ	0
54	(Northern Ireland) Stephen Thompson	Suzuki									WD	WD																	0
Pos	Rider	Bike	SIL (England)		BHI (England)		SNE (England)		OUL (England)		MOP (Republic of Ireland)		THR (England)		BHGP (England)		KNO (Scotland)		MAL (England)		CRO (England)		CAD (England)		OUL (England)		DON (England)		Pts

Colour	Result
Gold	Winner
Silver	Second place
Bronze	Third place
Green	Points classification
Blue	Non-points classification
Blue	Non-classified finish (NC)
Purple	Retired, not classified (Ret)
Red	Did not qualify (DNQ)
Red	Did not pre-qualify (DNPQ)
Black	Disqualified (DSQ)
White	Did not start (DNS)
White	Withdrew (WD)
White	Race cancelled (C)
Blank	Did not practice (DNP)
Blank	Did not arrive (DNA)
Blank	Excluded (EX)

P - Pole
FL - Fastest Lap

== Privateers Standings ==
Position	Rider	Points
1	(England) James Ellison	528
2	(England) Jon Kirkham	395
3	(England) Dennis Hobbs	330
4	(England) James Buckingham	320
5	(England) Sam Corke	241
6	(England) Chris Martin	236
7	(England) Gus Scott	101
8	(England) Chris Platt	93
9	(England) Malcolm Ashley	79
10	(England) Steve Brogan	73
11	(England) Adam Hitchcock	62
12	(Northern Ireland) Marty Nutt	56
13	(Wales) Paul Jones	45
14	(England) Kiel Bryce	42
15	(Australia) Cameron Donald	40
16	(England) Michael Pensavalle	38
17	(England) Howie Mainwaring	31
18	(England) Warren Scott	29
19	(England) Denver Robb	25
20	(Republic of Ireland) Derek Shiels	20
21	(England) Nick Medd	18
22	(England) Dijon Compton	16
