= Kiuchi =

Kiuchi (written: 木内 or きうち in hiragana) is a Japanese surname. Notable people with the surname include:

- Hidenobu Kiuchi (木内 秀信) (born 1969), Japanese voice actor
- Kazuhiro Kiuchi (きうち かずひろ) (born 1960), Japanese manga artist and film director
- Kiuchi Jūshirō (木内 重四郎) (1866–1925), Japanese politician
- Nobori Kiuchi (木内昇) (born 1967), Japanese novelist
- Reiko Kiuchi (木内 レイコ) (born 1968), Japanese voice actress
- Riona Kiuchi (木内 梨生奈) (born 1994), Japanese singer and actress

== See also ==
- Kiuchi Brewery (木内酒造), brewery in Naka, Ibaraki Prefecture, Japan
- 5481 Kiuchi, main-belt asteroid
