= Hitachino =

Hitachino may refer to:

- Hitachino-Ushiku Station, a railway station in Tsuchiura, Ibaraki Prefecture
- Hitachino Nest Beer, beer produced by Kiuchi Brewery

== See also ==
- Hitachi (disambiguation)
