= Hitachi (disambiguation) =

Hitachi is a multinational corporation specializing in high-technology.

Hitachi may also refer to:

== Places ==
- Hitachi, Ibaraki, Japan
- Hitachi Province, former province of Japan

== People ==
- Hanako, Princess Hitachi (born 1940), member of the Japanese imperial family
- Masahito, Prince Hitachi (born 1935), member of the Japanese imperial family

== Companies ==
- Hitachi Works, the oldest member of the Hitachi group and ancestral home of Hitachi, Ltd.
- Hitachi Cable, independent spin-off of Hitachi Works
- Hitachi Canadian Industries Ltd. (HCI), an independent subsidiary of Hitachi, Ltd. located in Saskatoon, Canada
- Hitachi Construction Machinery (Europe), subsidiary of Hitachi, Ltd., now parent of Euclid Trucks
- Hitachi Data Systems, a subsidiary of Hitachi, with enterprise storage systems group based both in Japan and in Santa Clara, California, US
- Hitachi Global Storage Technologies, disk drive manufacturer, wholly owned subsidiary of Western Digital
- Hitachi Maxell Ltd., commonly known as Maxell, a separate Japanese electronics company
- Hitachi Zosen Corporation — Osaka based engineering and heavy equipment company that is today known as Kanadevia

== Products ==
- Hitachi Hatsukaze, aircraft engines built in Japan
- Hitachi Magic Wand, a massager and vibrator

== Trains ==
- Hitachi (Australian train), EMUs formerly built and used in Melbourne, Australia, in the 1970s, using electrical equipment designed by Hitachi, Ltd.
- Hitachi (Japanese train), a limited express train service in Japan named after the old province of Hitachi
- Hitachi A-train, a series of trains manufactured by Hitachi, Ltd.

== Other uses ==
- Hitachi Foundation, a philanthropic organization founded in the U.S. by Hitachi in 1985
- Hitachi Tree, a named monkeypod tree in Moanalua Gardens and the corporate symbol of Hitachi, Ltd.
- T 258/03, also called Auction method/Hitachi, a decision of the Boards of Appeal of the European Patent Office
- "Hitachi", song by Adéla from Prima, 2026

== See also ==
- Hibachi
- Hitachino (disambiguation)
