= Yukio Kagayama =

Japanese motorcycle racer

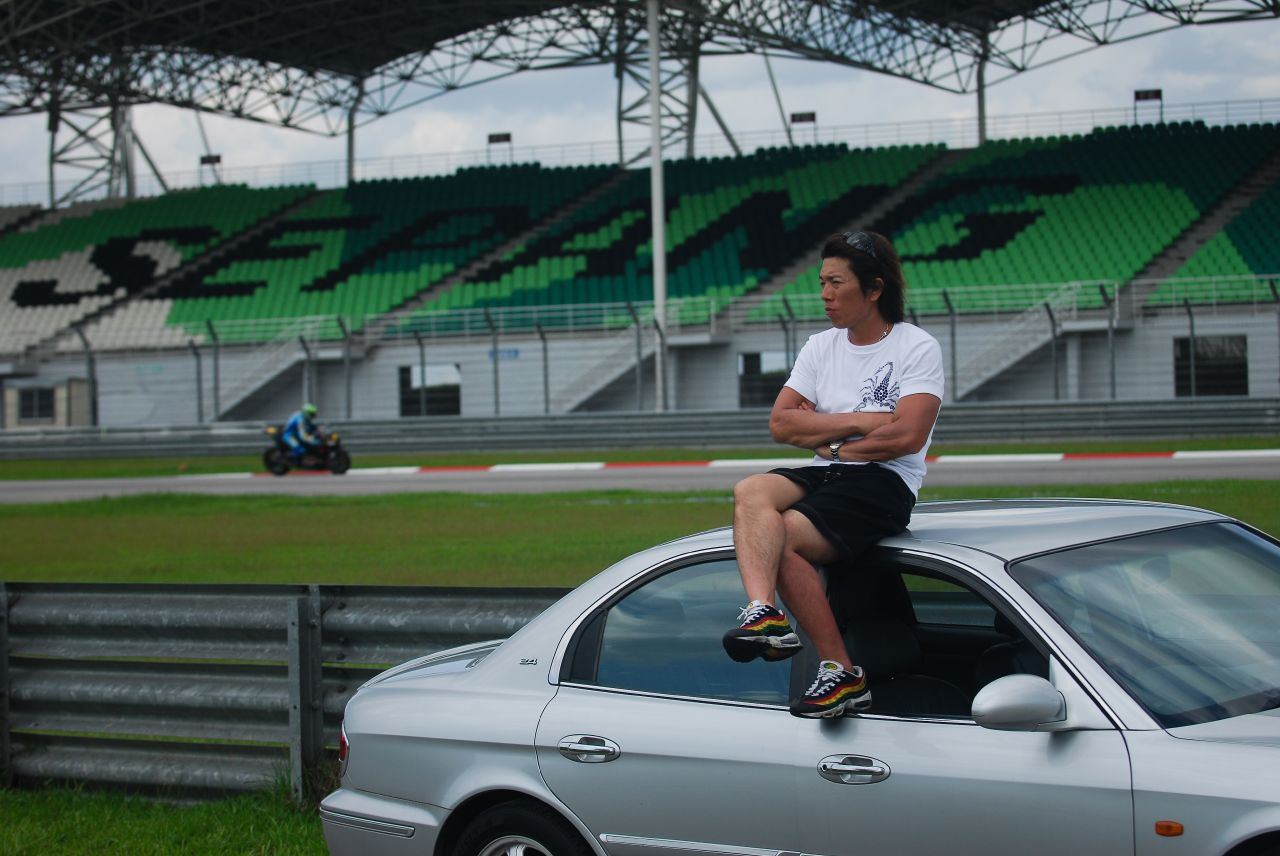
- Yukio Kagayama in 2007
- Nationality: Japanese
- Born: 4 May 1974 (age 52); Yokohama, Kanagawa, Japan
- Current team: Team KAGAYAMA
- Bike number: 71
- Website: team-kagayama.com
Motorcycle racing career statistics
Grand Prix motorcycle racing
Active years	1997 - 1999, 2001 - 2004
First race	1997 250cc Japanese Grand Prix
Last race	2004 MotoGP Qatar Grand Prix
Team	Suzuki
Championships	0
Starts / Wins / Podiums / Poles / F. laps / Points; 14 / 0 / 0 / 0 / 0 / 65
Superbike World Championship
Active years	2001, 2003, 2005 - 2009
Manufacturers	Suzuki
2009 championship position	12th
Starts / Wins / Podiums / Poles / F. laps / Points; 120 / 4 / 16 / 3 / 4 / 810
British Superbike Championship
Active years	2003-2004, 2010
Manufacturers	Suzuki
Championships	0
2010 championship position	15th
Starts / Wins / Podiums / Poles / F. laps / Points; / 7 / 19 / 3 / 9 / 641

Yukio Kagayama (加賀山就臣, Kagayama Yukio; born May 4, 1974) is a Japanese professional motorcycle road racer. He began his motorcycle racing career competing in the Japanese national championships before racing internationally in Grand Prix motorcycle racing, the Superbike World Championship as well as in the British Superbike Championship. Kagayama raced Suzuki motorcycles for the majority of his career.

== Motorcycle racing career ==
Kagayama was born in Yokohama Japan. He began motorcycle racing in 1990, competing for many years in the All Japan Road Race Championship, finishing fourth in 2001. He also contested four 250 cc World Championship races in 1997 and 1998, finishing in the top-eight in all four races.

In 2003, Kagayama raced in the British Superbike Championship for Rizla Suzuki, alongside double British champion John Reynolds, and had won three races when he crashed heavily at Cadwell Park. He returned for the start of 2004, finishing third in the championship despite not being at full fitness early in the season (a further crash caused a broken collarbone).

For 2005, Kagayama joined 1996 Superbike World Champion Troy Corser in the Belgian-based Alstare Suzuki team in the Superbike World Championship, and won races on the GSX-R1000, riding on largely unfamiliar circuits against some of the world's top riders. He finished fifth overall, and did enough to retain his ride for 2006. In the first race, he collided with Noriyuki Haga while battling for the lead on the final lap. He then had a run of poor results, before taking a third and a fourth at Misano, and then an impressive double win from the second row at Brno, nearly doubling his points total in one weekend. He came seventh overall in the series.

In 2006, Kagayama raced in the final round of the All Japan Road Race Championship at Suzuka as a wild card and won the race. In 2007, he remained at Suzuki, but missed four rounds through injury. He finished the season ranked 13th. Also in 2007, Kagayama teamed up with Kousuke Akiyoshi to win the prestigious Suzuka 8 Hours endurance race for Suzuki. For 2008 he switched his racing number to #34, as used by former 500 cc World Champion Kevin Schwantz. He once again had an injury-hit season, and was easily the lowest-placed of the three works Suzuki riders in the standings.

In 2010, Kagayama returned to the British Superbike Championship riding for the Worx Suzuki team. His teammate was Tommy Hill. He finished 15th overall with one podium finish.

In 2011, Kagayama launched his own team "Team Kagayama" for a full season in the JSB (Japanese Superbike) class of the All Japan Road Race Championship. He is the owner and sole rider for the team, and the team's bike is the Suzuki GSX-R1000. Kagayama could not record a win this season and ended up fourth in the championship.

Kagayama and the team are in the 2012 championship as well and recorded a win in the sixth round at Sugo. It was the first win for Kagayama since his full-season comeback to Japan in 2011 as well as for Team Kagayama since its launch the same year.

== Career rankings ==
1995: 11th, All Japan Road Race Championship Superbike Suzuki GSX-R750

1996: 11th, All Japan Road Race Championship GP250 Suzuki RGV250

1997: 3rd, All Japan Road Race Championship GP250 Suzuki RGV250

1998: 13th, All Japan Road Race Championship GP250 Suzuki RGV250

1999: 16th, All Japan Road Race Championship Superbike Suzuki GSX-R750

2000: 7th, All Japan Road Race Championship Superbike Suzuki GSX-R750

2001: 4th, All Japan Road Race Championship Superbike Suzuki GSX-R750

2002: Suzuki MotoGP Test Rider Suzuki GSV-R

2003: 7th, British Superbike Championship: Rizla Suzuki Crescent Suzuki GSX-R1000

2004: 3rd, British Superbike Championship: Rizla Suzuki Crescent Suzuki GSX-R1000

2005: 5th, Superbike World Championship: Alstare Suzuki Corona Extra Suzuki GSX-R1000

2006: 7th, Superbike World Championship: Alstare Suzuki Corona Extra Suzuki GSX-R1000

2007: 13th, Superbike World Championship: Alstare Suzuki Corona Extra Suzuki GSX-R1000

2008: 11th, Superbike World Championship: Team Suzuki Alstare Suzuki GSX-R1000

2009: 12th, Superbike World Championship: Team Suzuki Alstare Suzuki GSX-R1000

2010: 15th, British Superbike Championship: Worx Crescent Racing Suzuki GSX-R1000

2011: 4th, All Japan Road Race Championship JSB1000: Team Kagayama Suzuki GSX-R1000

2012: 8th, All Japan Road Race Championship JSB1000: Team Kagayama Suzuki GSX-R1000

2013: 10th, All Japan Road Race Championship JSB1000: Team Kagayama Suzuki GSX-R1000

2014: 5th, All Japan Road Race Championship JSB1000: Team Kagayama Suzuki GSX-R1000

2015- 12th, All Japan Road Race Championship JSB1000: Team Kagayama Suzuki GSX-R1000

2016- 8th, All Japan Road Race Championship JSB1000: Team Kagayama Suzuki GSX-R1000

2017- 10th, All Japan Road Race Championship JSB1000: Team Kagayama Suzuki GSX-R1000

2018- All Japan Road Race Championship JSB1000: Team Kagayama Suzuki GSX-R1000

== Suzuka 8 Hours ==
2000 - 22nd (Team Suzuki / Atushi Watanabe / GSX-R750)
2001 - 3rd (Team Suzuki / Akira Ryo, Atsushi Watanabe / GSX-R750)
2002 - DNF (Team Suzuki / Akira Ryo / GSX-R750)
2003 - DNF (Yoshimura Suzuki / Atsushi Watanabe / GSX-R1000)
2004 - 2nd (Yoshimura Suzuki / Atsushi Watanabe / GSX-R1000)
2005 - 10th (Yoshimura Suzuki / Atsushi Watanabe / GSX-R1000)
2007 - 1st (Yoshimura Suzuki / Kousuke Akiyoshi / GSX-R1000)
2008 - 4th (Yoshimura Suzuki / Kousuke Akiyoshi / GSX-R1000)
2010 - 6th (Yoshimura Suzuki / Daisaku Sakai, Nobuatsu Aoki / GSX-R1000)
2011 - 2nd (Yoshimura Suzuki / Josh Waters, Nobuatsu Aoki / GSX-R1000)
2012 - 15th (S.E.R.T. / Vincent Philippe, Anthony Delhalle / GSX-R1000)
2013 - 3rd (Team KAGAYAMA / Kevin Schwantz, Noriyuki Haga / GSX-R1000)
2014 - 3rd (Team KAGAYAMA & Verity / Dominique Aegerter, Noriyuki Haga / GSX-R1000)
2015 - 3rd (Team KAGAYAMA / Ryuichi Kiyonari, Noriyuki Haga / GSX-R1000)
2016 - 6th (Team KAGAYAMA / Ryuichi Kiyonari, Naomichi Uramoto / GSX-R1000)

- [Year] - [Result] ([Team] / [Teammate(s)] / [Bike])

=== FIM Endurance World Championship ===
==== By team ====
Year	Team	Bike	Rider	TC
2012	(France) Suzuki Endurance Racing Team	Suzuki GSX-R 1000	(France) Anthony Delhalle (France) Freddy Foray (France) Vincent Philippe (Japan) Yukio Kagayama (Japan) Takuya Tsuda	1st

=== Suzuka 8 Hours results ===
Year	Team	Co-riders	Bike	Pos.
2007	(Japan) Yoshimura Suzuki with JOMO	(Japan) Kousuke Akiyoshi (Japan) Yukio Kagayama	Suzuki GSX-R1000	1st

=== British Superbike Championship ===
(key) (Races in bold indicate pole position; races in italics indicate fastest lap)

Year	Bike	1		2		3		4		5		6		7		8		9		10		11		12		13		Pos	Pts
Year	Bike	R1	R2	R1	R2	R1	R2	R1	R2	R1	R2	R1	R2	R1	R2	R1	R2	R1	R2	R1	R2	R1	R2	R1	R2	R1	R2	Pos	Pts
2004	Suzuki	SIL; 4	SIL; Ret	BHI; 3	BHI; 5	SNE; 1	SNE; 4	OUL; 1	OUL; 1	MON; 4	MON; 5	THR	THR	**BHGP**; 4	**BHGP**; 3	KNO; 3	KNO; 5	MAL; 2	MAL; 15	**CRO**; 2	**CRO**; Ret	CAD; 3	CAD; 1	OUL; 3	OUL; 3	DON; 14	DON; 5	3rd	335

Year	Make	1			2			3			4			5			6			7			8			9			10			11			12			Pos	Pts
Year	Make	R1	R2	R3	R1	R2	R3	R1	R2	R3	R1	R2	R3	R1	R2	R3	R1	R2	R3	R1	R2	R3	R1	R2	R3	R1	R2	R3	R1	R2	R3	R1	R2	R3	R1	R2	R3	Pos	Pts
2010	Suzuki	BHI; 12	BHI; Ret		THR; 3	THR; 11		OUL; Ret	OUL; DNS		CAD; Ret	CAD; DNS		MAL	MAL		KNO	KNO		SNE	SNE; 21	SNE; 10	BHGP; 8	BHGP; 8	BHGP; 7	CAD; 7	CAD; 7		CRO; 16	CRO; 14		SIL; 13	SIL; 14		OUL; 13	OUL; 13	OUL; 11	15th	92
