= Kousuke Akiyoshi =

Japanese motorcycle racer

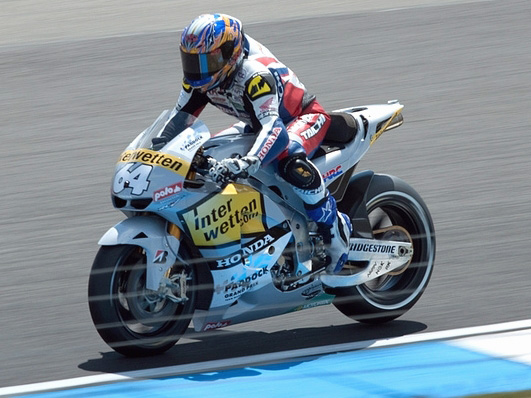
- Akiyoshi at the 2010 Dutch TT.
- Nationality: Japanese
- Born: January 12, 1975 (age 51); Kurume, Fukuoka, Japan
- Current team: Tellurium & Kohara RT; HRC Test Team
- Bike number: 090
Motorcycle racing career statistics
MotoGP World Championship
Active years	2006–2008, 2010–2011, 2015
Manufacturers	Suzuki, Honda
Championships	0
2015 championship position	NC (0 pts)
Starts / Wins / Podiums / Poles / F. laps / Points; 9 / 0 / 0 / 0 / 0 / 14

Kousuke Akiyoshi (秋吉耕佑, Akiyoshi Kōsuke; born January 12, 1975) is a Japanese motorcycle road racer. He is a two-time champion in the All-Japan Superbike Championship, and has competed sporadically in the MotoGP World Championship.

Akiyoshi is known in his native Japan as a competitor in the MFJ All Japan Road Race GP250 Championship, and most notably the All Japan Superbike championship, where he has enjoyed success with the Yoshimura Suzuki team riding a Suzuki GSX-R1000. In July 2007 he, along with Yukio Kagayama, won the Suzuka 8 Hours endurance race on a Yoshimura Suzuki bike.

== Career ==
=== National racing ===
Akiyoski made his début in the All Japan GP250 Championship in 1995, riding a Suzuki RGV250. He finished in 24th in his first season, before improving to tenth the following season. In 1997, Akiyoshi moved into the All Japan Superbike Championship – later the All Japan JSB1000 Championship – where he has spent the majority of his career. He won the championship in 2010 and 2011, riding a Honda CBR1000RR.

=== Grand Prix appearances ===
Akiyoshi has also competed in a number of Grands Prix of the MotoGP series. These have included The Japanese Grand Prix at Motegi, where he finished 13th on his debut with the Rizla Suzuki team as a wildcard rider, as well as two races in 2007 at Jerez and Japan. He came 17th at the Spanish race, and had a good run in Japan where he was running seventh behind Casey Stoner, but retired four laps from the finish. In 2008, he competed in the Japanese Grand Prix for a third year running, again for Rizla Suzuki. He retired on lap 1 after going down at the first corner.

In the 2010 season, Akiyoshi stood in for the injured Hiroshi Aoyama at the Interwetten Honda team. He competed in two races for the team, finishing 15th at the Dutch TT in Assen and 13th at the Catalan Grand Prix in Catalunya. He was then replaced by San Marinese rider Alex de Angelis. Akiyoshi replaced Aoyama once again at the Gresini Racing team for the 2011 Dutch TT, however not through injury, as Aoyama himself replaced the injured Dani Pedrosa at Repsol Honda. Akiyoshi also competed at the Japanese Grand Prix as a wildcard entry with LCR Honda – along with Shinichi Itoh, racing for HRC Honda – as a gesture of support for those affected by the March 2011 Tōhoku earthquake and tsunami.

== Career statistics ==
=== Races by year ===
(key)

Year	Class	Bike	1	2	3	4	5	6	7	8	9	10	11	12	13	14	15	16	17	18	Pos	Pts
2006	MotoGP	Suzuki	SPA	QAT	TUR	CHN	FRA	ITA	CAT	NED	GBR	GER	USA	CZE	MAL	AUS	JPN; 13	POR	VAL		21st	3
2007	MotoGP	Suzuki	QAT	SPA; 17	TUR	CHN	FRA	ITA	CAT	GBR	NED	GER	USA	CZE	RSM	POR	JPN; Ret	AUS	MAL	VAL	NC	0
2008	MotoGP	Suzuki	QAT	SPA	POR	CHN	FRA	ITA	CAT	GBR	NED	GER	USA	CZE	RSM	INP	JPN; Ret	AUS	MAL	VAL	NC	0
2010	MotoGP	Honda	QAT	SPA	FRA	ITA	GBR	NED; 15	CAT; 13	GER	USA	CZE	INP	RSM	ARA	JPN	MAL	AUS	POR	VAL	20th	4
2011	MotoGP	Honda	QAT	SPA	POR	FRA	CAT	GBR	NED; 13	ITA	GER	USA	CZE	INP	RSM	ARA	JPN; 12	AUS	MAL	VAL	20th	7
2015	MotoGP	Honda	QAT	AME	ARG	SPA	FRA	ITA	CAT	NED	GER	INP	CZE	GBR	RSM	ARA	JPN; 19	AUS	MAL	VAL	NC	0

=== Suzuka 8 Hours results ===
Year	Team	Co-riders	Bike	Pos.
2007	(Japan) Yoshimura Suzuki with JOMO	(Japan) Kousuke Akiyoshi (Japan) Yukio Kagayama	Suzuki GSX-R1000	1st
2011	(Japan) F.C.C. TSR	(Japan) Ryuichi Kiyonari (Japan) Shinichi Ito	Honda CBR1000RRW	1st
2012	(Japan) F.C.C. TSR	(Japan) Tadayuki Okada (United Kingdom) Jonathan Rea	Honda CBR1000RRW	1st

=== Asia Superbike 1000 ===
==== Races by year ====
(key) (Races in bold indicate pole position; races in italics indicate fastest lap)

Year	Bike	1		2		3		4		5		6		Pos	Pts
Year	Bike	R1	R2	R1	R2	R1	R2	R1	R2	R1	R2	R1	R2	Pos	Pts
2022	Honda	CHA	CHA	SEP	SEP	SUG; Ret	SUG; 8	SEP	SEP	CHA	CHA			20th	8
2023	Honda	CHA	CHA	SEP	SEP	SUG; 9	SUG; 9	MAN	MAN; C	ZHU	ZHU	CHA	CHA	21st	14

=== All Japan Road Race Championship ===
==== Races by year ====
(key) (Races in bold indicate pole position; races in italics indicate fastest lap)

Year	Class	Bike	1	2	3	4	5	6	7	8	9	10	11	Pos	Pts
2024	JSB1000	Honda	SUZ; Ret	MOT1; 12	MOT2; Ret	SUG1; 17	SUG2; 18	MOT; 11	AUT1	AUT2	OKA	SUZ1; 17	SUZ2; 13	19th	15
