= Warren Scott =

British racing driver (born 1971)

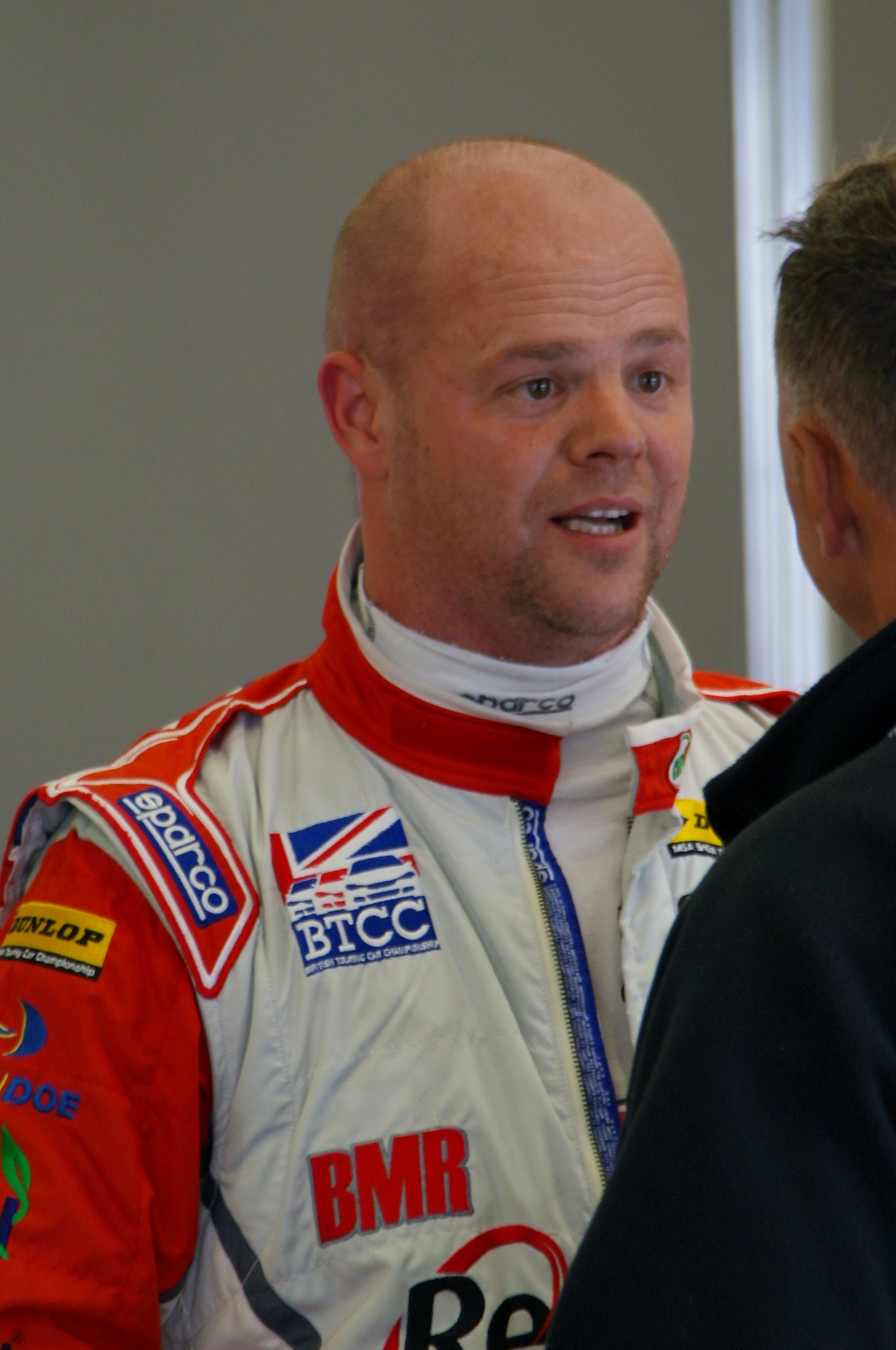
- Scott at the Silverstone round of the 2013 British Touring Car Championship season.
- Nationality: (United Kingdom) British
- Born: Warren George Scott; 28 September 1971 (age 55) Bishop's Stortford (England)

British Touring Car Championship career
- Debut season: 2013
- Current team: Silverline Subaru BMR Racing
- Car number: 39
- Starts: 99
- Wins: 0
- Poles: 0
- Fastest laps: 0
- Best finish: 21st in 2014

Previous series
- 2004: British Superbike Championship

Warren George Scott (born 28 September 1971) is a British racing driver. He has previously competed in the British Touring Car Championship with his self-run Team BMR. He has also raced in the British Superbike Championship.He was born and raised within the town of buntingford.

== Racing career ==
=== British Superbike Championship ===
Scott rode a BMR Racing Kawasaki Ninja ZX-10R at the 2004 British Superbike Championship season, finishing 18th in the Privateers Cup standings.

=== British Touring Car Championship ===
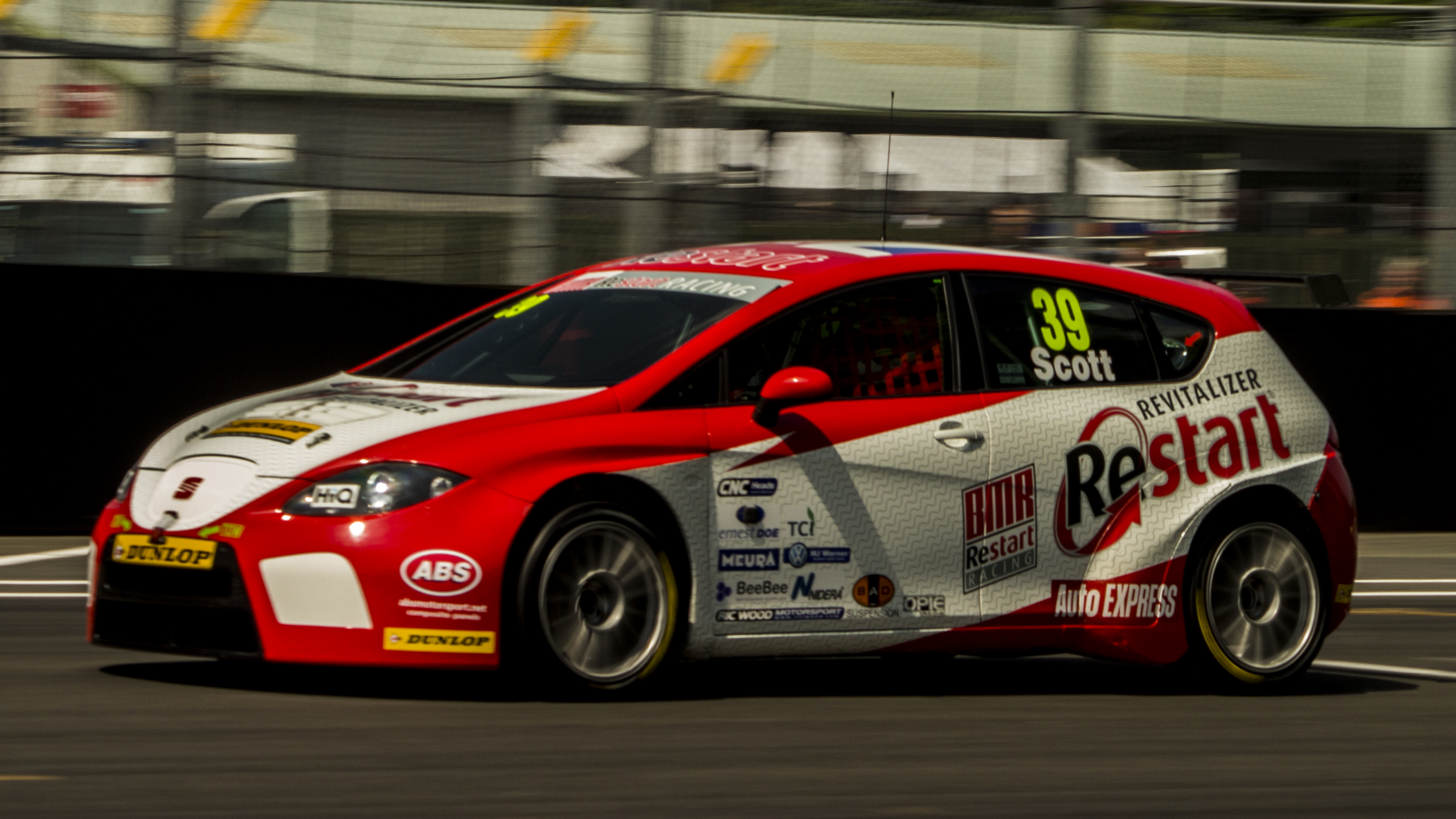
Scott driving the Team BMR SEAT León at Oulton Park during the 2013 British Touring Car Championship season.

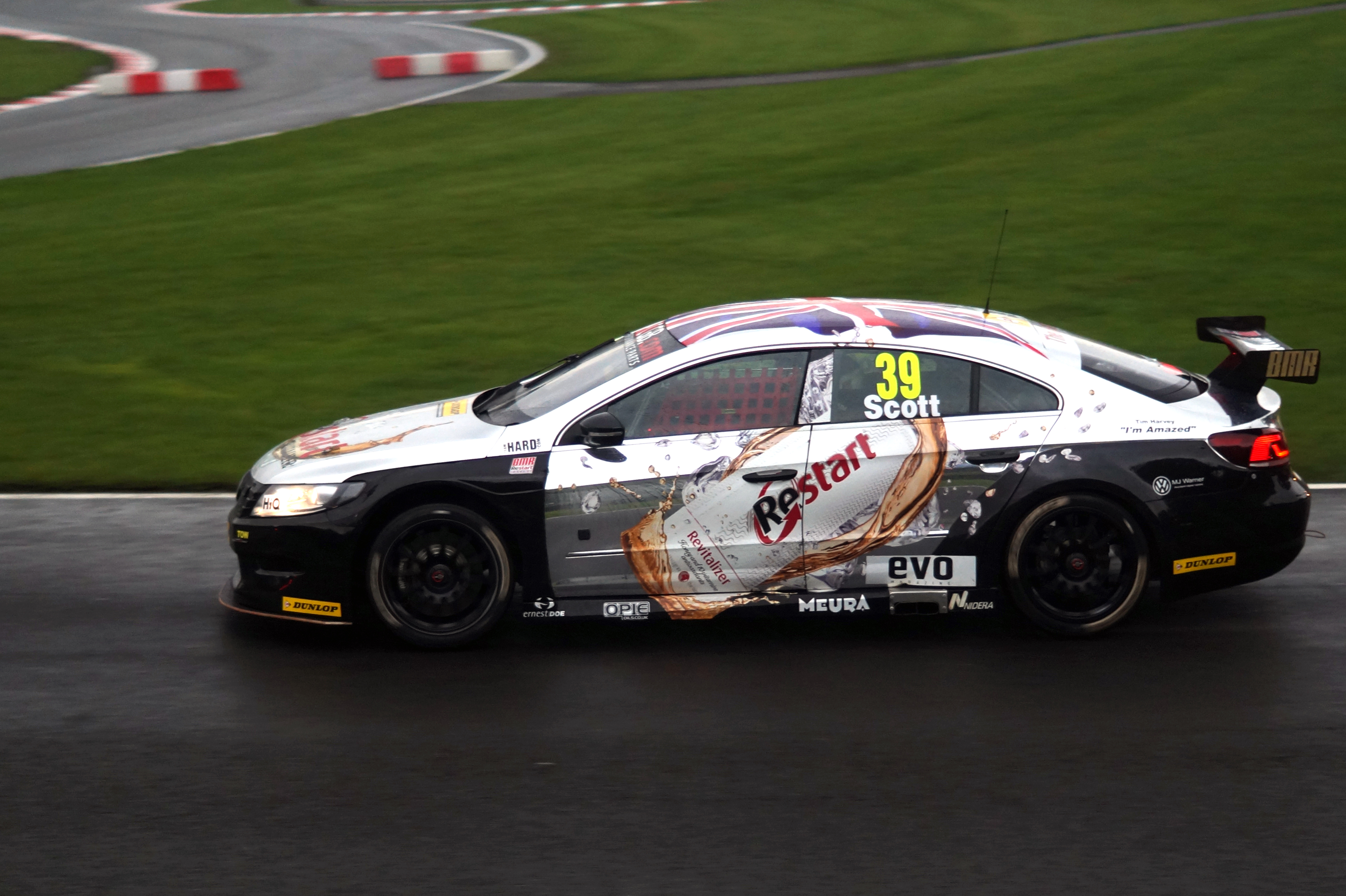
Scott driving the Team BMR Volkswagen CC at Brands Hatch during the 2013 British Touring Car Championship season.

Scott entered the BTCC in 2013 driving a Super 2000 SEAT León with which he was eligible for the Jack Sears Trophy He was unable to start the races at Croft due to a timing belt issue. For the second half of the season, Team BMR Restart and Team HARD. agreed a partnership that allowed Scott to switch to an NGTC Volkswagen CC from Snetterton onwards.

Scott was joined by former BTCC Champions Jason Plato and Colin Turkington plus Aron Smith in a foup in the 2015 British Touring Car Championship season.

=== British Rallycross Championship ===
Scott would drive an LD Motorsports-run Citroen DS3 Supercar at the 2017 British Rallycross Championship.

== Racing record ==
=== British Superbike Championship ===
(key) (Races in bold indicate pole position; races in italics indicate fastest lap)

Year	Class	Bike	1		2		3		4		5		6		7		8		9		10		11		12		13		Pos	Pts
Year	Class	Bike	R1	R2	R1	R2	R1	R2	R1	R2	R1	R2	R1	R2	R1	R2	R1	R2	R1	R2	R1	R2	R1	R2	R1	R2	R1	R2	Pos	Pts
2004	BSB	Kawasaki	SIL	SIL	BHI; DNQ	BHI; DNQ	SNE; 16	SNE; 20	OUL; 18	OUL; Ret	MON	MON	THR	THR	BHGP	BHGP	KNO	KNO	MAL	MAL	CRO	CRO	CAD	CAD	OUL	OUL	DON	DON	38th	0

=== Complete British Touring Car Championship results ===
(key) (Races in bold indicate pole position – 1 point awarded just in first race) (Races in italics indicate fastest lap – 1 point awarded all races) (* signifies that driver lead race for at least one lap – 1 point given all races)

Year	Team	Car	1	2	3	4	5	6	7	8	9	10	11	12	13	14	15	16	17	18	19	20	21	22	23	24	25	26	27	28	29	30	Pos	Pts
2013	Team BMR Restart	SEAT León	BRH; 1; 22	BRH; 2; 15	BRH; 3 Ret	DON; 1; 26	DON; 2 Ret	DON; 3; 19	THR; 1 Ret	THR; 2 Ret	THR; 3; 21	OUL; 1 Ret	OUL; 2 DNS	OUL; 3 Ret	CRO; 1 DNS	CRO; 2 DNS	CRO; 3 DNS																32nd	1
2013	Team BMR Restart	Volkswagen CC																SNE; 1 Ret	SNE; 2 DNS	SNE; 3 DNS	KNO; 1 DNS	KNO; 2; 16	KNO; 3 Ret	ROC; 1; 19	ROC; 2; 18	ROC; 3; 17	SIL; 1; 16	SIL; 2 Ret	SIL; 3; 16	BRH; 1 Ret	BRH; 2 Ret	BRH; 3 Ret	32nd	1
2014	CHROME Edition Restart Racing	Vauxhall Insignia	BRH; 1; 16	BRH; 2; 15	BRH; 3; 23	DON; 1 Ret	DON; 2; 21	DON; 3 Ret	THR; 1 Ret	THR; 2 Ret	THR; 3 Ret	OUL; 1; 23	OUL; 2; 18	OUL; 3; 14	CRO; 1; 25	CRO; 2 Ret	CRO; 3; 17																21st	19
2014	CHROME Edition Restart Racing	Volkswagen CC																SNE; 1; 12	SNE; 2 Ret	SNE; 3 Ret	KNO; 1; 15	KNO; 2 Ret	KNO; 3 DNS	ROC; 1 Ret	ROC; 2 DNS	ROC; 3 Ret	SIL; 1; 16	SIL; 2; 9	SIL; 3; 9	BRH; 1 Ret	BRH; 2 DNS	BRH; 3 Ret	21st	19
2015	Team BMR RCIB Insurance	Volkswagen CC	BRH; 1; 22	BRH; 2 Ret	BRH; 3 Ret	DON; 1; 11	DON; 2 Ret	DON; 3; 15	THR; 1; 18	THR; 2 NC	THR; 3 Ret	OUL; 1; 16	OUL; 2; 16	OUL; 3; 12	CRO; 1; 18	CRO; 2; 15	CRO; 3; 10	SNE; 1; 13	SNE; 2 Ret	SNE; 3; 19	KNO; 1; 13	KNO; 2; 19	KNO; 3 Ret	ROC; 1 Ret	ROC; 2; 20	ROC; 3 Ret	SIL; 1 DNS	SIL; 2 DNS	SIL; 3 DNS	BRH; 1	BRH; 2	BRH; 3	22nd	23
2016	Silverline Subaru BMR Racing	Subaru Levorg GT	BRH; 1 DNS	BRH; 2; 21	BRH; 3; 19	DON; 1; 25	DON; 2; 19	DON; 3 Ret	THR; 1 WD	THR; 2 WD	THR; 3 WD	OUL; 1; 17	OUL; 2; 18	OUL; 3; 24	CRO; 1; 16	CRO; 2; 26	CRO; 3 Ret	SNE; 1; 9	SNE; 2; 16	SNE; 3 Ret	KNO; 1 Ret	KNO; 2 Ret	KNO; 3; 25	ROC; 1; 19	ROC; 2 NC	ROC; 3 Ret	SIL; 1 Ret	SIL; 2; 29	SIL; 3 DNS	BRH; 1 Ret	BRH; 2; 23	BRH; 3 Ret	27th	7
