= 2011 Japanese motorcycle Grand Prix =

(Japan) 2011 Japanese Grand Prix
Race details
- Race 15 of 18 races in the 2011 Grand Prix motorcycle racing season
- Date: 2 October 2011
- Official name: Grand Prix of Japan
- Location: Twin Ring Motegi
- Course: Permanent racing facility; 4.801 km (2.983 mi)

MotoGP
Pole position
- Rider: (Australia) Casey Stoner
- Time: 1:45.267
Fastest lap
- Rider: (Spain) Dani Pedrosa
- Time: 1:46.090
Podium
- First: (Spain) Dani Pedrosa
- Second: (Spain) Jorge Lorenzo
- Third: (Australia) Casey Stoner

Moto2
Pole position
- Rider: (Spain) Marc Márquez
- Time: 1:52.067
Fastest lap
- Rider: (Italy) Andrea Iannone
- Time: 1:52.307
Podium
- First: (Italy) Andrea Iannone
- Second: (Spain) Marc Márquez
- Third: (Switzerland) Thomas Lüthi

125cc
Pole position
- Rider: (France) Johann Zarco
- Time: 1:57.888
Fastest lap
- Rider: (France) Johann Zarco
- Time: 1:58.508
Podium
- First: (France) Johann Zarco
- Second: (Spain) Nicolás Terol
- Third: (Spain) Héctor Faubel

The 2011 Japanese motorcycle Grand Prix was the fifteenth round of the 2011 Grand Prix motorcycle racing season. It took place on the weekend of 29 September–2 October 2011 at the Twin Ring Motegi, located in Motegi, Japan. The Grand Prix, originally scheduled for 24 April, was moved to 2 October due to the effects of the Tōhoku earthquake and the Fukushima I nuclear accidents.

Due to concerns with possible radiation an independent survey of Motegi and the surrounding area was commissioned by FIM and Dorna Sports. That survey generated a preliminary report which stated "Based on the estimate dose it can be said by no doubt that the radiation risk during the race event is negligible." On 2 August the full report was received and the organisers stated that the race would take place as scheduled.

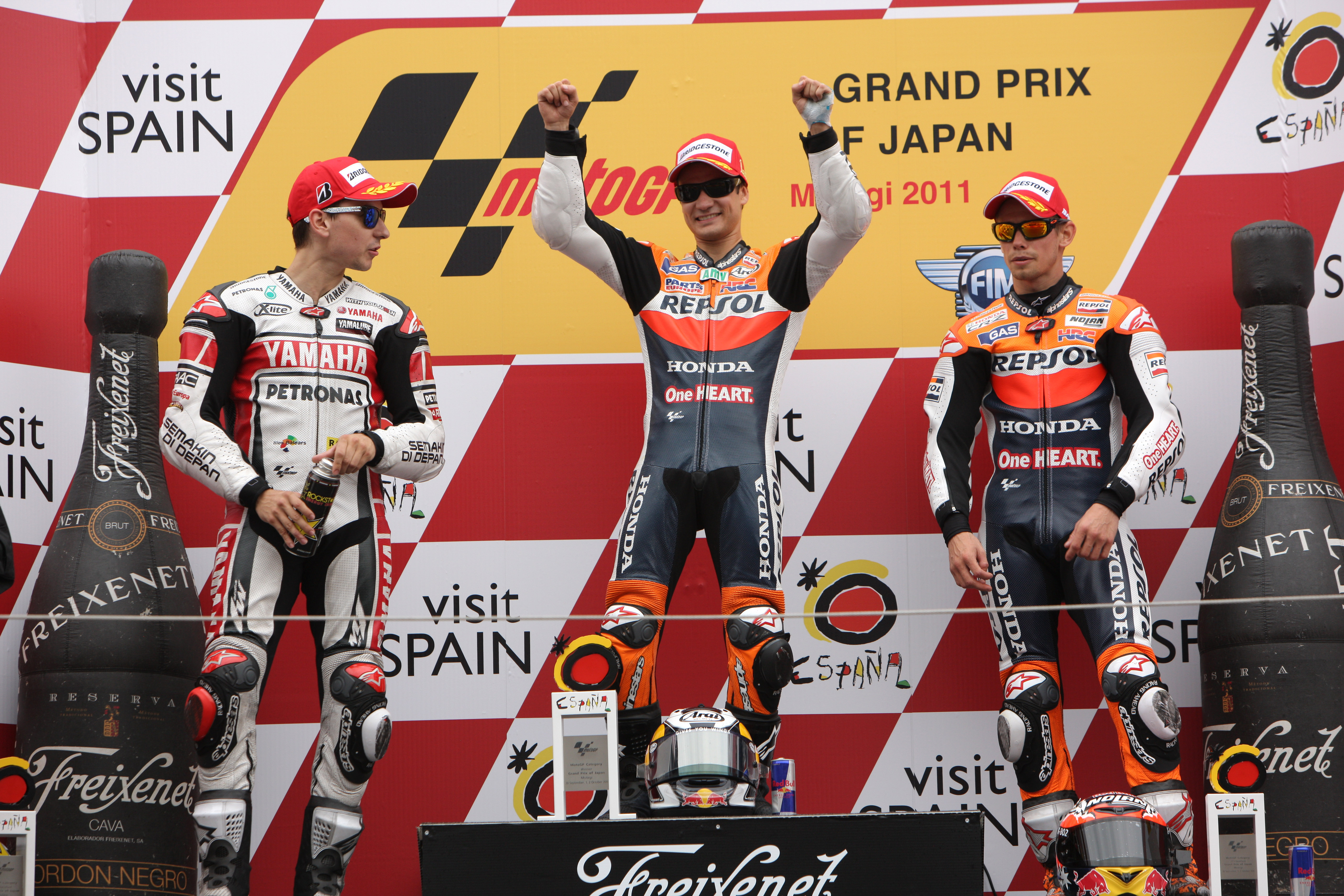
Jorge Lorenzo, Dani Pedrosa and Casey Stoner, celebrating on the podium after finishing second, first and third at the MotoGP race.

== MotoGP classification ==
Pos.	No.	Rider	Team	Manufacturer	Laps	Time/Retired	Grid	Points
1	26	(Spain) Dani Pedrosa	Repsol Honda Team	Honda	24	42:47.481	4	25
2	1	(Spain) Jorge Lorenzo	Yamaha Factory Racing	Yamaha	24	+7.299	2	20
3	27	(Australia) Casey Stoner	Repsol Honda Team	Honda	24	+18.380	1	16
4	58	(Italy) Marco Simoncelli	San Carlo Honda Gresini	Honda	24	+23.550	6	13
5	4	(Italy) Andrea Dovizioso	Repsol Honda Team	Honda	24	+23.691	3	11
6	11	(United States) Ben Spies	Yamaha Factory Racing	Yamaha	24	+37.604	5	10
7	69	(United States) Nicky Hayden	Ducati Team	Ducati	24	+39.167	10	9
8	5	(United States) Colin Edwards	Monster Yamaha Tech 3	Yamaha	24	+45.023	14	8
9	7	(Japan) Hiroshi Aoyama	San Carlo Honda Gresini	Honda	24	+49.074	11	7
10	14	(France) Randy de Puniet	Pramac Racing Team	Ducati	24	+59.022	13	6
11	35	(United Kingdom) Cal Crutchlow	Monster Yamaha Tech 3	Yamaha	24	+1:13.964	12	5
12	64	(Japan) Kousuke Akiyoshi	LCR Honda MotoGP	Honda	24	+1:21.709	16	4
13	72	(Japan) Shinichi Ito	Honda Racing Team	Honda	24	+1:26.381	18	3
Ret	24	(Spain) Toni Elías	LCR Honda MotoGP	Honda	17	Accident	15	
Ret	19	(Spain) Álvaro Bautista	Rizla Suzuki MotoGP	Suzuki	13	Accident	8	
Ret	6	(Australia) Damian Cudlin	Pramac Racing Team	Ducati	13	Accident	17	
Ret	8	(Spain) Héctor Barberá	Mapfre Aspar Team MotoGP	Ducati	1	Accident	9	
Ret	46	(Italy) Valentino Rossi	Ducati Team	Ducati	0	Collision	7	
DNS	17	(Czech Republic) Karel Abraham	Cardion AB Motoracing	Ducati		Injured		

== Moto2 classification ==
Pos.	No.	Rider	Manufacturer	Laps	Time/Retired	Grid	Points
1	29	(Italy) Andrea Iannone	Suter	23	43:25.007	3	25
2	93	(Spain) Marc Márquez	Suter	23	+1.999	1	20
3	12	(Switzerland) Thomas Lüthi	Suter	23	+3.686	2	16
4	65	(Germany) Stefan Bradl	Kalex	23	+4.313	8	13
5	3	(Italy) Simone Corsi	FTR	23	+4.647	6	11
6	15	(San Marino) Alex de Angelis	Motobi	23	+4.813	7	10
7	38	(United Kingdom) Bradley Smith	Tech 3	23	+10.520	4	9
8	77	(Switzerland) Dominique Aegerter	Suter	23	+10.725	9	8
9	34	(Spain) Esteve Rabat	FTR	23	+11.387	17	7
10	36	(Finland) Mika Kallio	Suter	23	+12.803	12	6
11	19	(Belgium) Xavier Siméon	Tech 3	23	+18.259	16	5
12	13	(Australia) Anthony West	MZ-RE Honda	23	+20.815	22	4
13	51	(Italy) Michele Pirro	Moriwaki	23	+23.795	14	3
14	75	(Italy) Mattia Pasini	FTR	23	+24.388	10	2
15	44	(Spain) Pol Espargaró	FTR	23	+34.071	20	1
16	16	(France) Jules Cluzel	Suter	23	+38.236	26	
17	9	(United States) Kenny Noyes	FTR	23	+39.505	29	
18	76	(Germany) Max Neukirchner	MZ-RE Honda	23	+39.609	28	
19	54	(Turkey) Kenan Sofuoğlu	Suter	23	+42.296	18	
20	45	(United Kingdom) Scott Redding	Suter	23	+44.162	15	
21	53	(France) Valentin Debise	FTR	23	+46.662	30	
22	14	(Thailand) Ratthapark Wilairot	FTR	23	+46.950	25	
23	68	(Colombia) Yonny Hernández	FTR	23	+49.625	27	
24	4	(Switzerland) Randy Krummenacher	Kalex	23	+50.590	36	
25	39	(Venezuela) Robertino Pietri	Suter	23	+52.044	35	
26	6	(Spain) Joan Olivé	FTR	23	+52.365	33	
27	63	(France) Mike Di Meglio	Tech 3	23	+1:02.873	24	
28	7	(Japan) Tomoyoshi Koyama	TSR 6	23	+1:35.559	32	
29	95	(Qatar) Mashel Al Naimi	Moriwaki	23	+1:35.771	34	
30	72	(Japan) Yuki Takahashi	Moriwaki	22	+1 lap	5	
31	40	(Spain) Aleix Espargaró	Pons Kalex	20	+3 laps	13	
Ret	80	(Spain) Axel Pons	Pons Kalex	17	Retirement	23	
Ret	64	(Colombia) Santiago Hernández	FTR	17	Accident	31	
Ret	18	(Spain) Jordi Torres	Suter	0	Collision	11	
Ret	35	(Italy) Raffaele De Rosa	Suter	0	Collision	19	
Ret	88	(Spain) Ricard Cardús	Moriwaki	0	Collision	21	
DNS	30	(Japan) Takaaki Nakagami	Suter		Injured		
DNS	33	(Spain) Sergio Gadea	Moriwaki		Injured		
OFFICIAL MOTO2 REPORT

== 125 cc classification ==
Pos.	No.	Rider	Manufacturer	Laps	Time/Retired	Grid	Points
1	5	(France) Johann Zarco	Derbi	20	39:49.968	1	25
2	18	(Spain) Nicolás Terol	Aprilia	20	+5.900	3	20
3	55	(Spain) Héctor Faubel	Aprilia	20	+13.605	2	16
4	25	(Spain) Maverick Viñales	Aprilia	20	+16.191	4	13
5	11	(Germany) Sandro Cortese	Aprilia	20	+23.422	7	11
6	94	(Germany) Jonas Folger	Aprilia	20	+23.661	8	10
7	23	(Spain) Alberto Moncayo	Aprilia	20	+24.034	5	9
8	26	(Spain) Adrián Martín	Aprilia	20	+24.171	9	8
9	52	(United Kingdom) Danny Kent	Aprilia	20	+49.118	18	7
10	19	(Italy) Alessandro Tonucci	Aprilia	20	+51.393	10	6
11	84	(Czech Republic) Jakub Kornfeil	Aprilia	20	+51.893	13	5
12	77	(Germany) Marcel Schrötter	Mahindra	20	+1:01.043	16	4
13	53	(Netherlands) Jasper Iwema	Aprilia	20	+1:04.921	15	3
14	21	(United Kingdom) Harry Stafford	Aprilia	20	+1:05.606	24	2
15	63	(Malaysia) Zulfahmi Khairuddin	Derbi	20	+1:06.245	23	1
16	8	(Australia) Jack Miller	KTM	20	+1:07.653	26	
17	82	(Japan) Hikari Ookubo	Honda	20	+1:07.770	25	
18	50	(Norway) Sturla Fagerhaug	Aprilia	20	+1:11.052	30	
19	30	(Switzerland) Giulian Pedone	Aprilia	20	+1:15.954	20	
20	14	(South Africa) Brad Binder	Aprilia	20	+1:16.227	27	
21	65	(Japan) Syunya Mori	Aprilia	20	+1:16.729	32	
22	36	(Spain) Joan Perelló	Aprilia	20	+1:17.514	29	
23	39	(Spain) Luis Salom	Aprilia	20	+1:40.618	12	
24	79	(Japan) Takehiro Yamamoto	Honda	20	+1:41.836	33	
25	89	(Italy) Luca Fabrizio	Aprilia	19	+1 lap	35	
Ret	17	(United Kingdom) Taylor Mackenzie	Aprilia	17	Retirement	28	
Ret	10	(France) Alexis Masbou	KTM	13	Retirement	21	
Ret	81	(Japan) Hyuga Watanabe	Honda	10	Retirement	31	
Ret	99	(United Kingdom) Danny Webb	Mahindra	9	Retirement	19	
Ret	7	(Spain) Efrén Vázquez	Derbi	8	Retirement	6	
Ret	31	(Finland) Niklas Ajo	Aprilia	1	Accident	22	
Ret	3	(Italy) Luigi Morciano	Aprilia	1	Accident	11	
Ret	28	(Spain) Josep Rodríguez	Aprilia	1	Retirement	14	
DNS	96	(France) Louis Rossi	Aprilia	0	Did not start	17	
DNS	80	(Japan) Jun Ohnishi	Honda	0	Did not start	34	
OFFICIAL 125cc REPORT

== Championship standings after the race (MotoGP) ==
Below are the standings for the top five riders and constructors after round fifteen has concluded.

Riders' Championship standings

Pos.	Rider	Points
1	(Australia) Casey Stoner	300
2	(Spain) Jorge Lorenzo	260
3	(Italy) Andrea Dovizioso	196
4	(Spain) Dani Pedrosa	195
5	(United States) Ben Spies	156

Constructors' Championship standings

Pos.	Constructor	Points
1	(Japan) Honda	355
2	(Japan) Yamaha	294
3	(Italy) Ducati	162
4	(Japan) Suzuki	73

- Note: Only the top five positions are included for both sets of standings.

Previous race: 2011 Aragon Grand Prix	FIM Grand Prix World Championship; 2011 season	Next race: 2011 Australian Grand Prix
Previous race: 2010 Japanese Grand Prix	Japanese motorcycle Grand Prix	Next race: 2012 Japanese Grand Prix
