= Riona Kiuchi =

Japanese recording artist and actress (born 1994)

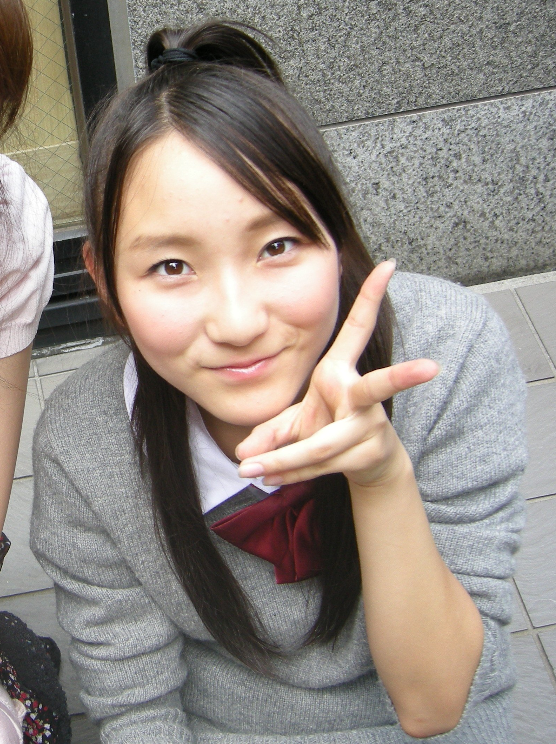

Background information
- Born: 木内 梨生奈 (Kiuchi Riona); July 26, 1994 (age 32)
- Origin: Tokyo, Japan
- Genres: Pop
- Occupations: Singer, child actor
- Years active: 2003–2008
- Label: Columbia Japan (2006–2008)
- Website: Twitter

Riona Kiuchi (born July 26, 1994) is a Japanese recording artist and actress. She rose to the first big fame in her life when she appeared on the Japanese television show Tensai Terebi Kun MAX in 2005.

Two years earlier, Kiuchi participated in a dance contest held during the avex's annual summer concert tour a-nation 2003 and won first place in Tokyo area. Besides, she danced again at the national contest and was ranked third. Thanks to these remarkable results, she could sign a contract with avex Planning & Development Inc. to improve her general artistic skill.

== Childhood and youth ==
As her mother had been a singer, Kiuchi was exposed to many kinds of music since she was a baby. After signing the contract, as a developing student of avex Planning & Development, she entered avex artist academy in Tokyo. She was featured in the music video of "Choo Choo Train" by EXILE in 2003. She finally came on the stage of Kōhaku Uta Gassen as one of many young backup dancers for the song in the end of the year.

In April 2005, Kiuchi appeared on Tensai Terebi Kun MAX (TTK) and started her career as a "Terebi Senshi (TV fighter)". Two months later, she joined a group Tiny Circus for Music Terebi Kun (MTK) and played completely original songs since the 2005 season. She sang the first song for the group "Sakasamasakasa" as the leading vocalist and solo parts in the theme song of the 2006 season, and she also recorded a duet song "Fuyu no Ageha (Swallowtail in Winter)" with Ramu Hosoda who was the second Terebi Senshi from avex. In her final season on TTK, she performed a solo song "Fuyu no Candle (Candle in Winter)", of which she collaborated with Aya Ishihara in writing the lyrics. Besides, as four years had passed since the last solo MTK song was released, it was so phenomenal that she got called the Diva of TTK and was given an award in the end of the 2007 season.

After she graduated from TTK in March 2008, Kiuchi was featured on the play "V･O･I･C･E" at Tokyo Actor & Actress Market 2008 Summer.

== Discography ==
=== Albums ===
Date of release	Title	Label	Tracks including Kiuchi's recordings
March 1, 2006	NHK Tensai TV Kun MAX ~MTK the 10th~	Columbia Music Entertainment	1, 3, 5, 8
March 21, 2007	NHK Tensai TV Kun MAX ~MTK the 11th~	Columbia Music Entertainment	1, 2, 3, 5, 8, 9, 16, 18, 19
February 20, 2008	NHK Tensai TV Kun MAX ~MTK the 12th~	Columbia Music Entertainment	1, 6, 13, 16, 20

=== Singles ===
Date of release	Title	Label	Tracks including Kiuchi's recordings
May 23, 2007	NHK Tensai TV Kun MAX "Yakusoku No Basho E ~Secrets Utopia~"	Columbia Music Entertainment	1, 2
May 21, 2008	NHK Tensai TV Kun MAX "Sekai Wo Mawase! ~Our Carnival~"	Columbia Music Entertainment	3, 4
