= Team Renegade =

Martial arts gym based in Birmingham, UK

Team Renegade MMA & BJJ
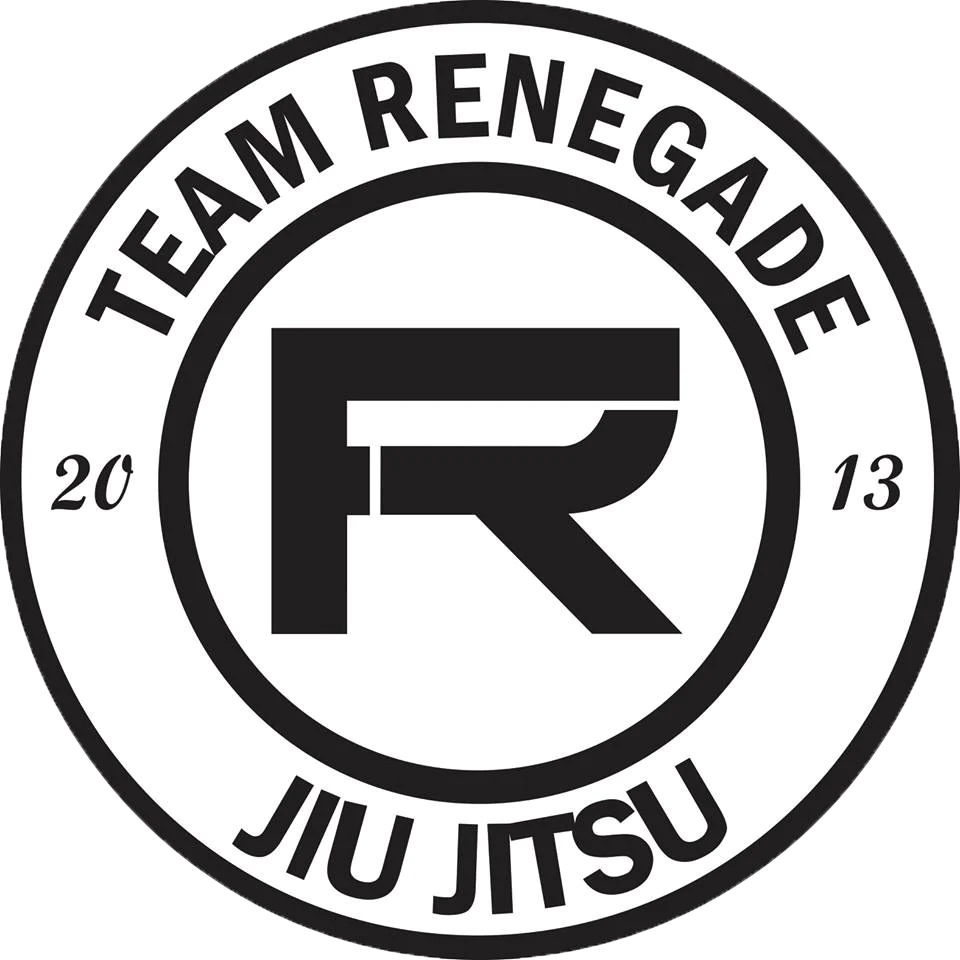
- Est.: 2013; 13 years ago
- Primary owners: Ash Beggs; Tom Breese
- Primary trainers: Chiu Kwong Man; Dave Lovell
- Training facilities: Longbridge, Birmingham, United Kingdom

Team Renegade is a British mixed martial arts (MMA) and Brazilian jiu-jitsu (BJJ) gym based in Birmingham. It is notable for producing former UFC Welterweight Champion, Leon Edwards and is the first gym in the United Kingdom to produce a UFC Champion.

== History ==
Team Renegade was founded in 2013 in Kings Heath. It originally focused on BJJ and training for grappling competitions.

In 2018, Ultimate Training Centre (UTC) gym, a nearby MMA gym in Erdington closed and its members moved to Team Renegade. Its members included Leon Edwards and Tom Breese. Afterwards Team Renegade became an MMA gym and started offering MMA services.

The gym has a more decentralized approach to coaching. Rather than have everything under one coach, members are given the opportunity to act as coaches who can share their specific skillsets while also providing feedback to others.

During the COVID-19 pandemic, Team Renegade has to close its original premise and relocate to another location in Birmingham.

On 27 October 2023, The Independent reported that top-15 ranked UFC fighter, Ian Machado Garry who went to Team Renegade to train was banned from returning at the request of Edwards and his coach Dave Lovell. Garry stated Edwards and Lovell had concerns and doubts due to insecurities since Garry was competing in the same division and could one day be challenging Edwards for the UFC title. A few days later, Team Renegade issued its own statement where it claimed Garry was banned from returning as he did not add to the team's culture. Veronica Hardy who trained at the gym has pointed out that Garry was the only person to have been kicked out of Team Renegade and that he didn't follow basic rules.

== Notable fighters ==
- Leon Edwards
- Fabian Edwards
- Arnold Allen
- Jai Herbert
- Tom Breese
- Aaron Chalmers
- Ian Machado Garry

== See also ==
- List of professional MMA training camps
