= Suzuki GSX-R1000 =

Sports motorcycle

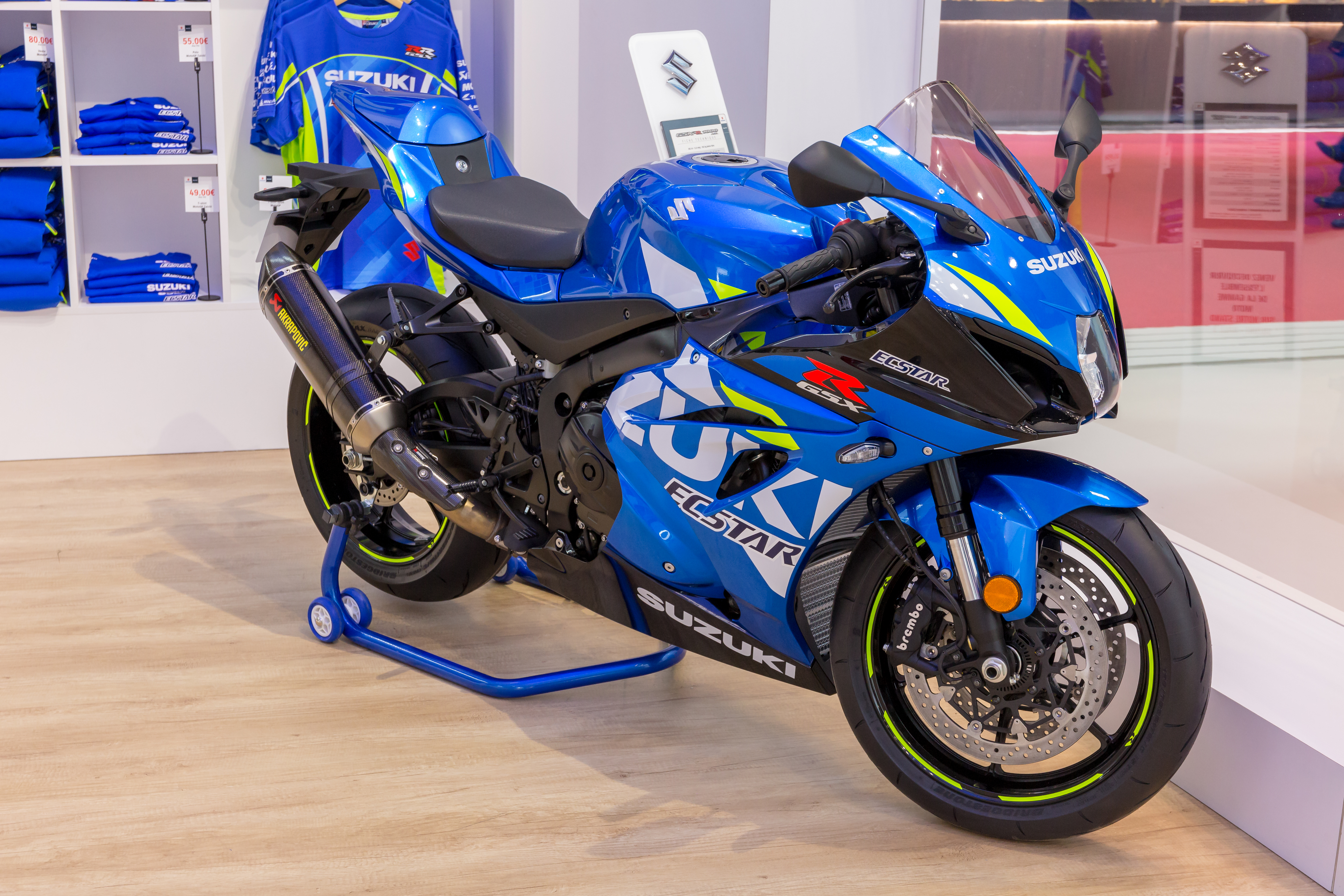
- Manufacturer: Suzuki
- Also called: Gixxer, GSXR
- Production: 2001–present
- Predecessor: GSX-R1100
- Class: Sportbike
- Engine: 1,000 cc (61 cu in)
- Related: Suzuki GSX-R600; Suzuki GSX-R750

The Suzuki GSX-R1000 (often called a Gixxer) is a sports motorcycle made by Suzuki. It was introduced in 2001 to replace the GSX-R1100, and is powered by a liquid-cooled 999 cc (61.0 cu in) inline four-cylinder, four-stroke engine, although originally 988 cc (60.3 cu in) from 2001 to 2004.

== History ==
=== 2001 (K1, K2) ===
For 2001, Suzuki introduced a new GSX-R model that replaced the largest and most powerful model of the GSX-R series sportbike, the GSX-R1100, with the all-new GSX-R1000. As the model name revealed, the engine's cylinder displacement was roughly 100 cc smaller than its predecessor. The GSX-R1000 was not just an enlarged version of the GSX-R750, although it shared many features with the smaller version. The mainframe is the same in both models, but the material used on the GSX-R1000 was 0.5 mm (0.020 in) thicker. Suzuki claimed the torsional rigidity of the frame had increased 10% in comparison with the GSX-R750.

The GSX-R1000 engine was a redesigned GSX-R750 engine. The GSX-R1000 had a 1 mm (0.04 in) bigger bore and 13 mm (0.51 in) longer stroke, newly designed pistons with a lower crown, and a gear-driven counter balancer. The engine weighed 130.0 lb (59.0 kg), which was slightly heavier than the 750 engine, but 31.0 lb (14.1 kg) lighter than the engine of the GSX1300R. The performance of the engine is a peak of 160 bhp (119 kW) at 9,500 rpm, as measured on the crank and 143 hp (107 kW), when measured on the rear wheel with small variations between different instances of the same model. The redline is set at 12,000 rpm. The maximum torque of the engine is 80 ft⋅lbf (110 N⋅m) at 8,000 rpm. Combined with a total (dry) weight of 374 lb (170 kg), this gives the GSX-R1000 a top speed of 173 mph (278 km/h), a quarter-mile time of 10.1 seconds at 141.7 mph (228.0 km/h), and a 0 to 100 km/h (62 mph) time of 3 seconds.

Using titanium for the exhaust downpipe (the K1 model link pipe is black, K2 model link pipe is polished titanium) and the inside of the silencer, enabled the GSX-R1000s exhaust system to become 4 lb (1.8 kg) lighter than that of the 750. Titanium was also used in the front fork (titanium-nitride) to coat the stanchions. An exhaust-tuning valve had been mounted inside the exhaust pipe. Using a servo, the system dynamically adjusted the exhaust backpressure, according to engine speed, throttle position, and gear selection for increased torque, lower emissions, and decreased noise—the (stock) exhaust noise of the GSX-R1000 is notably lower than that of the GSX-R600.

With the 2001 model of the GSX-R1000, the 1998 Yamaha YZF-R1 was finally surpassed, with the GSX-R being lighter and more powerful.

The 2001 model carried over to 2002 with minimal changes; 2002 introduced modifications to the fuel pump, clutch, front axle, torque link, mirrors, and luggage hooks. The manual fast-idle was replaced with a computer-operated implementation (the "STV servo"). New colors and new GSXR stickers were used.

=== 2003 (K3, K4) ===
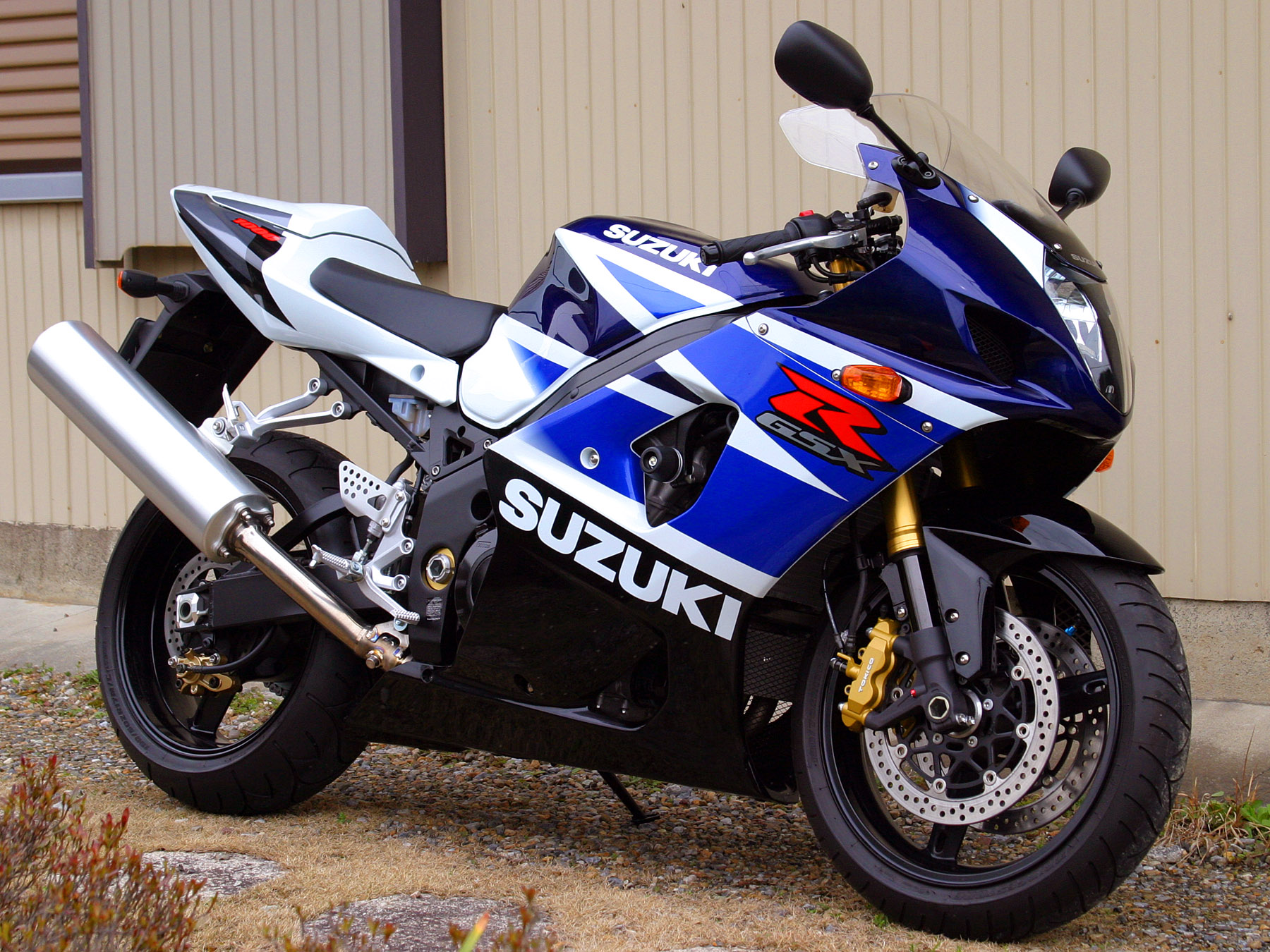
2003 GSX-R1000 K3

After the GSX-R1000 had been on the roads and race tracks for three years, Suzuki put out a new version of the model in late September 2002. Suzuki engineers had been working on the three things that made a fast bike faster; weight, power, and handling. The 2003 model year's GSX-R1000 weighed less, had more power/torque, and handled better.

The physical dimensions of the bike were almost identical to the previous year's model. The seat height and the overall height were somewhat lower, but the geometry of the bike was exactly the same as before. The already rigid aluminum-alloy frame was newly designed and enforced with internal ribs, with an updated headlight and tail fairing. The frame and the wheels were now coated black.

The front brakes were also new. Suzuki decided to drop the six-piston calipers. The new radially mounted four-piston calipers weigh 30 grams less and grip smaller 300 mm (12 in) discs that save another 300 g (11 oz). Though smaller, Suzuki claimed that the new brakes provide better stopping and turn-in performance.

The headlights of the 2003 year's GSX-R1000 were mounted vertically to enable the ram-air intakes in the front to be placed 20 mm (0.79 in) nearer the bike's centerline. The new design was very much inspired by the look of the Hayabusa. The instruments were also redesigned.

The cylinder displacement of the engine remained the same 988 cc (60.3 cu in), but more power/torque and better throttle response had been achieved by adding four ventilation holes between the cylinders to equalize crankcase pressure beneath the pistons, moving the air intake nearer to the centerline, and upgrading the engine management system from a 16-bit to a 32-bit engine control unit. The entire exhaust system was now made of titanium to save an additional 1.32 lb (0.60 kg) and the taillight bulb was replaced with LEDs.

The 2003 model carried over to 2004 without any significant improvements.

=== 2005 (K5, K6) ===
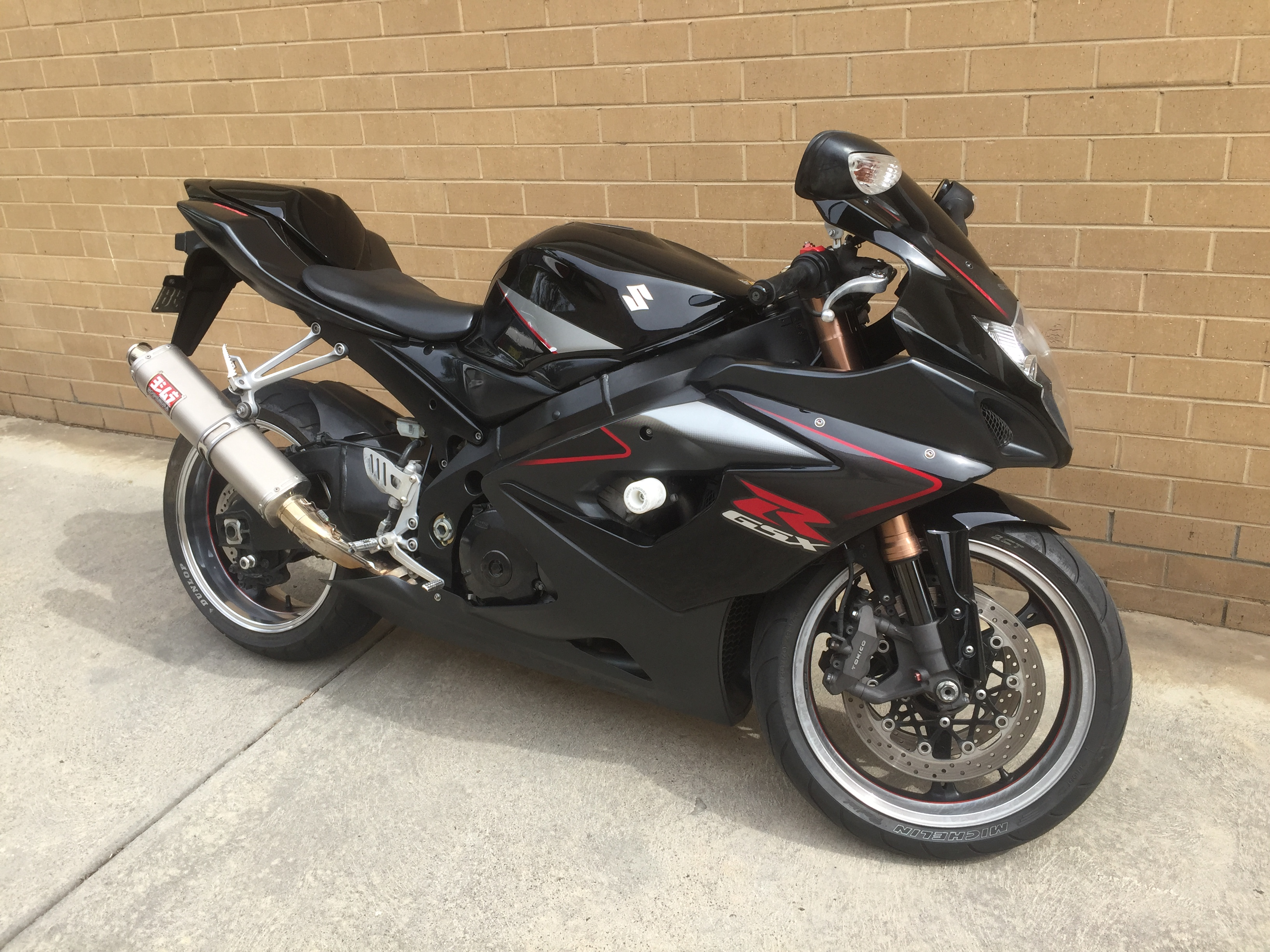
2005 GSX-R1000 K5

The 2005 model-year GSX-R1000 had a redesigned engine and chassis. It had a 4.4 lb (2.0 kg) decrease in weight compared to the previous model and the engine had an 11 cc (0.67 cu in) larger displacement due to a 0.4 mm bore increase. It had a totally new frame, reducing the total length of the bike by 1.6 in (41 mm), but reducing its wheelbase only 0.02 in (0.51 mm). New brakes with radial mounted calipers and 310 mm (12.2 in) discs were used at the front. The new titanium silencer (catalytic in Europe) was said to be designed to reduce turbulence to a minimum. This model weighs 166 kg or 365 lb dry, putting it towards the top of the power-to-weight ratio charts.

The 2005 model has a tested wet weight of 444 lb (201 kg). Power output is tested at 178 hp (133 kW) and peak torque is 75.4 ft⋅lbf (102.2 N⋅m), both at the rear wheel. Also in 2005, Suzuki used a single "S" logo on the tank on all models instead of the brand's full name.

The 2005 model carried over to 2006 without any significant improvements other than a few appearance changes. The 2006 model had a measured top speed of 178 mph (286 km/h).

On the list of fastest production motorcycles by acceleration, a 2006 GSX-R1000 at a drag strip once recorded a 0 to 60 mph time of 2.35 seconds. This is the only GSX-R1000 that has won a World Superbike championship.

=== 2007 (K7, K8) ===
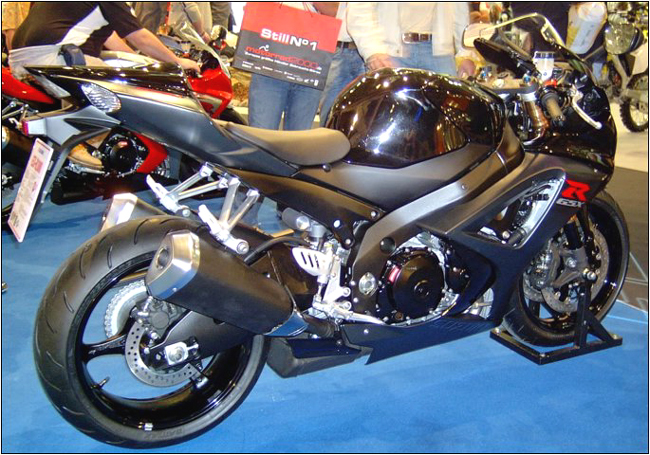
2007 GSX-R1000 K7

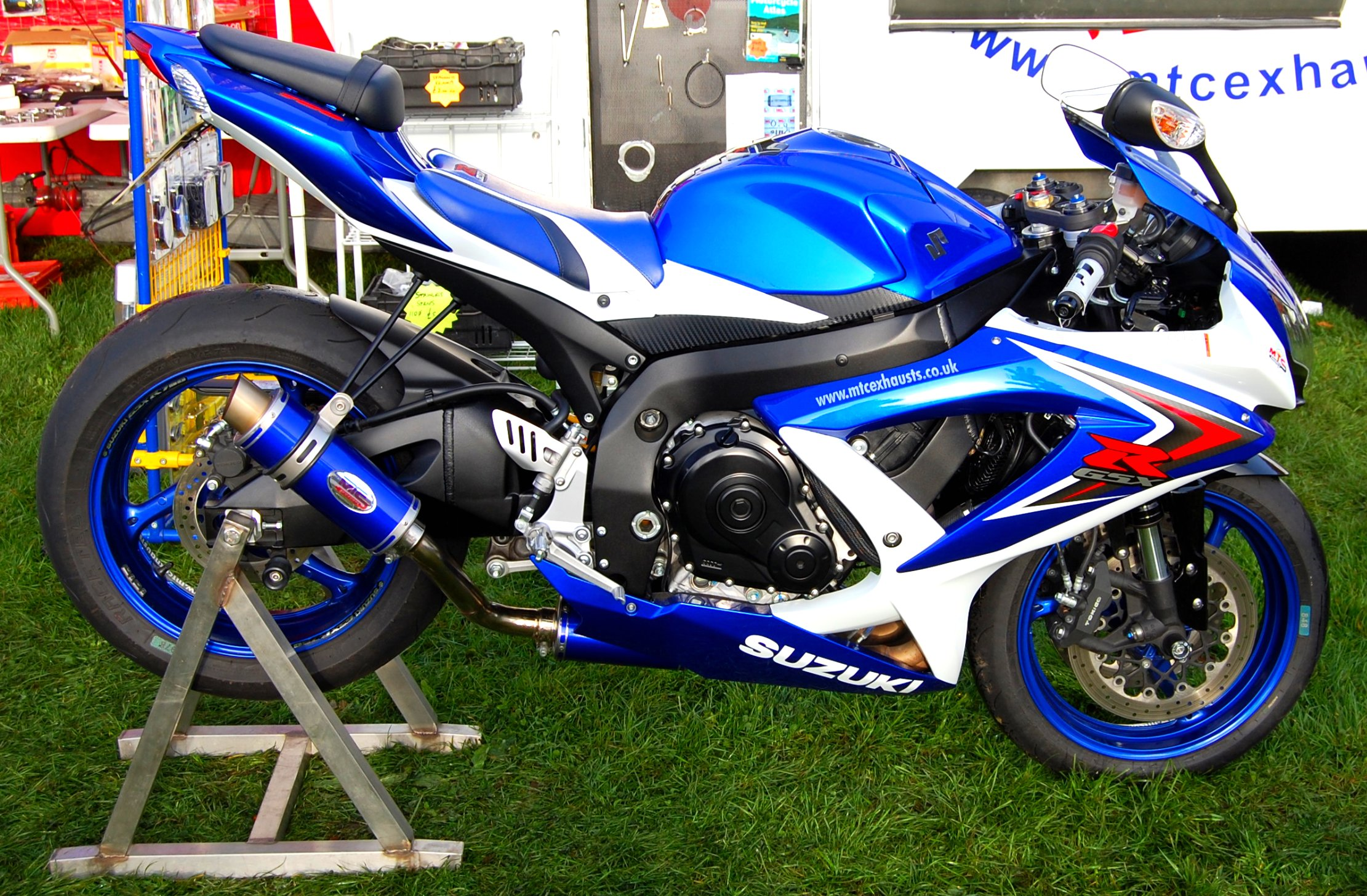
2010 GSX-R1000 K8

On September 22, 2006, Suzuki revealed a significantly updated GSX-R1000 for 2007 at the Paris Motor Show. The new bike gained 14 lb (6.4 kg) over the 2006 model, due to its new exhaust system and new emissions regulations. To counter this weight increase, Suzuki claimed improved aerodynamics along with a faster-revving engine and larger throttle body. Although not a completely new model, the engine and chassis have been updated. It also featured three different engine mapping configurations, selectable using two buttons located on the right handlebar. One up, and one down arrow to cycle between Mode A (unrestricted), Mode B (reduced power until 50% throttle is applied), and Mode C (reduced power throughout the range regardless of throttle application). It also received a hydraulic clutch.

The 2007 model carried over to 2008 without any significant improvements.

=== 2017 (L7) ===
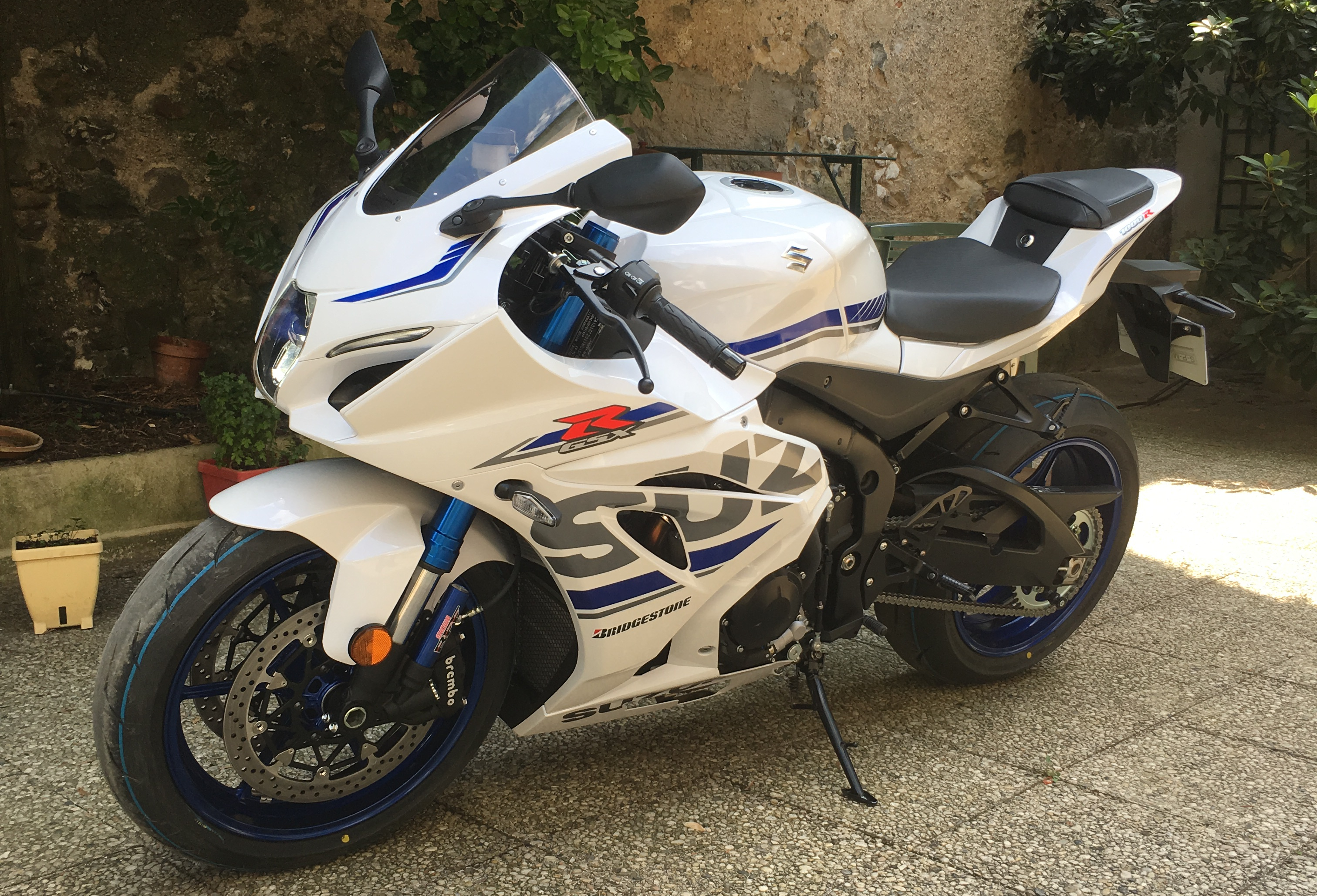
2018 Suzuki GSX-R1000R

The 2017 model, introduced to reporters at EICMA in late 2016, had a significantly redesigned engine, the first since the update on the 2009 model. This new engine has a higher rotational speed limit and no balancer shaft to quell vibration, and a mechanical variable valve timing used for 10 years by Suzuki in MotoGP and drive-by-wire throttle. This model was the first to get the addition of traction control with an inertial measuring unit measuring yaw, roll, and pitch; also, all lighting is now LED. Another first for any GSX-R is the use of a fuel gauge on this model. Along with the new 2017 GSX-R1000 model, Suzuki has also released an up-specification model GSX-R1000R, which comes with a motion track brake system, bidirectional quick shifter, and launch control. Also on the R model, as reported by Sport Rider, are the same Showa balance-free front fork and balance-free rear cushion shock that come standard on the 2016 Kawasaki ZX-10R. Specifications are 202 horsepower at 13,200 rpm (claimed), 177.2 (rear wheel), 86 lb-ft torque at 10,000 rpm (claimed) and 76.3 lb⋅ft (103.4 N⋅m) (rear wheel); 76.0 mm x 55.1 mm bore x stroke, and 13.2:1 compression ratio.

Registering the model in the EU, EFTA, or UK was to be illegal from 1 January 2023 unless it is updated to comply with Euro 5. New sales are already banned in India, as it does not comply with BS VI.

== Specifications ==
Year	2001–2002	2003–2004	2005–2006	2007–2008	2009–2011	2012–2016	2017–present
Engine	988cc, 4-stroke, liquid-cooled, 4-cylinder, DOHC		998.6cc, 4-stroke, liquid-cooled, 4-cylinder, DOHC		999cc, 4-stroke, liquid-cooled, 4-cylinder, DOHC		999.8cc 4-stroke, liquid-cooled, 4-cylinder, DOHC
Bore × stroke	73.0 mm × 59.0 mm (2.87 in × 2.32 in)		73.4 mm × 59.0 mm (2.89 in × 2.32 in)		74.5 mm × 57.3 mm (2.93 in × 2.26 in)		76.0 mm × 55.1 mm (2.99 in × 2.17 in)
Compression ratio	12.0:1		12.5:1		12.8:1	12.9:1	13.2:1
Fuel system	Fuel injection with Ride-by-Wire throttle bodies						
Lubrication	Wet sump						
Ignition	Electronic ignition (transistorized)						
Max Power	103.7 kW (139.0 hp)	113.6 kW (152.3 hp)	119.2 kW (159.8 hp)	117.2 kW (157.2 hp)	137 kW (184 hp)	138 kW (185 hp)	151 kW (203 hp)
Max Torque	102.2 N⋅m (75.4 lb⋅ft)	105.9 N⋅m (78.1 lb⋅ft)	107.4 N⋅m (79.2 lb⋅ft)	103.2 N⋅m (76.1 lb⋅ft)	103.7 N⋅m (76.5 lb⋅ft)	117 N⋅m (86 lb⋅ft)	117 N⋅m (86 lb⋅ft)
Max speed	186 mph (299 km/h)		190 mph (310 km/h)				
Transmission	6-speed, constant-mesh sequential manual		6-speed, constant-mesh sequential manual, back-torque limiting clutch				
Final drive	530 chain, 110 links, 17T / 42T			530 chain, 110 links, 17T / 43T	530 chain, 114 links, 17T / 42T		525 chain, 120 links, 17T / 45T
Front suspension	Kayaba 43 mm (1.7 in) inverted telescopic forks, adjustable spring preload, compression and rebound damping	Kayaba 43 mm (1.7 in) inverted telescopic forks with DLC coating, adjustable spring preload, compression and rebound damping	Inverted telescopic forks, fully adjustable spring preload, compression and rebound damping	Inverted telescopic forks, fully adjustable spring preload, high & low speed compression and rebound damping			Showa Big Piston Fork; Inverted telescopic forks, fully adjustable spring preload, high & low speed compression and rebound damping
Rear suspension	Link type, gas/oil damped, fully adjustable spring preload, compression and rebound damping	Link type, oil damped, adjustable spring preload, compression and rebound damping	Link type, gas/oil-damped, fully adjustable spring preload, compression and rebound damping	Link type, gas/oil-damped, fully adjustable spring preload, high & low speed compression and rebound damping	Link type, gas/oil-damped, fully adjustable spring preload, high & low speed compression and rebound damping		Showa link type, gas/oil-damped, fully adjustable spring preload, high & low speed compression and rebound damping
Front wheel	17M/C × MT3.50						
Rear wheel	17M/C × MT6.00						
Front tire	120/70 ZR17 58W						
Rear tire	190/50 ZR17 73W					190/55 ZR17 75W	
Front brake	Dual 320 mm semi-floating discs; Tokico 6-piston calipers	Dual 300 mm semi-floating discs; Tokico 4-piston radial mounted calipers	Dual 310 mm semi-floating discs; Tokico 4-piston radial mounted calipers		Dual 310 mm semi-floating discs; Tokico 4-piston monoblock radial mounted calipers	Dual 310 mm floating discs; Brembo 4-piston radial mounted calipers	Dual 320 mm floating discs; Brembo 4-piston radial mounted calipers and ABS
Rear brake	Single 220 mm disc; Tokico dual piston caliper		Single 220 mm disc; Tokico pin-slide single piston caliper		Single 220 mm disc; Tokico pin-slide single piston caliper		Single 220 mm disc; Nissin 1-piston and ABS
Wheelbase	1,410 mm (55.5 in)		1,405 mm (55.3 in)	1,415 mm (55.7 in)	1,405 mm (55.3 in)		1,420 mm (56 in)
Overall Length	2,045 mm (80.5 in)	2,070 mm (81.5 in)	2,030 mm (79.9 in)	2,045 mm (80.5 in)			2,075 mm (81.7 in)
Overall Width	715 mm (28.1 in)		710 mm (28.0 in)	720 mm (28.3 in)	710 mm (28.0 in)	705 mm (27.8 in)	
Overall Height	1,135 mm (44.7 in)	1,145 mm (45.1 in)	1,130 mm (44.5 in)				1,145 mm (45.1 in)
Seat Height	830 mm (33 in)	820 mm (32 in)	810 mm (32 in)		810 mm (32 in)		825 mm (32.5 in)
Ground Clearance	130 mm (5.1 in)		125 mm (4.9 in)	120 mm (4.7 in)			130 mm (5.1 in)
Curb Weight	197 kg (435 lb)	201 kg (443 lb)	199 kg (439 lb)	208 kg (458 lb)	209 kg (460 lb)	203 kg (448 lb)	202 kg (445 lb)
Fuel tank capacity	18 L (4.0 imp gal; 4.8 US gal)				17.5 L (3.8 imp gal; 4.6 US gal)		17 L (3.7 imp gal; 4.5 US gal)

== Motorsport ==
Troy Corser won the 2005 Superbike World Championship season, and Alessandro Polita won the 2006 FIM Superstock 1000 Cup season. The bike was used by Yukio Kagayama and Kousuke Akiyoshi to win the Suzuka 8 Hours endurance race in 2007, with Kazuki Tokudome and Nobuatsu Aoki doing the same in 2009. Michael Dunlop rode the GSXR at the 2022 Isle of Man TT Senior.

== See also ==
- List of fastest production motorcycles by acceleration
