= Kiuchi Brewery =

Kiuchi Brewery Inc. 木内酒造
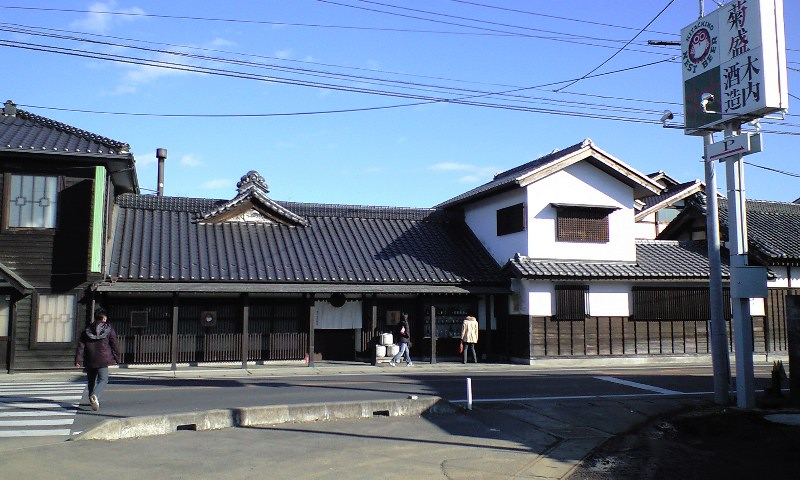
- Kiuchi Sake Brewery in Naka
- Industry: Alcoholic beverage
- Founded: 1823; 203 years ago in Naka, Ibaraki, Japan
- Headquarters: Naka, Ibaraki, Japan 36°28′07.0″N 140°28′05.2″E
- Products: Beer, sake, shōchū

Kiuchi Brewery (木内酒造) is a brewery in Naka, Ibaraki Prefecture, Japan. It was established in 1823 by village headman Kiuchi Gihei as a sake and shochu producer.

Craft beer production began in 1996 after a change in Japanese law governing micro brewing. A number of Kiuchi's products seek to combine European beer-making technology with traditional Japanese brewing techniques; for example, its XH Hitachino Nest Beer is matured in shochu casks.

== Products ==
=== Hitachino Nest Beer ===
- Amber Ale
- Espresso Stout
- Japanese Classic Ale (an India Pale Ale)
- Lacto Sweet Stout
- New Year Celebration Ale (a spiced ale)
- Pale Ale
- Real Ginger Ale (a ginger flavoured ale)
- Red Rice Ale
- White Ale
- Weizen
- XH (a Belgian strong ale)
- Dai Dai (Orange IPA)
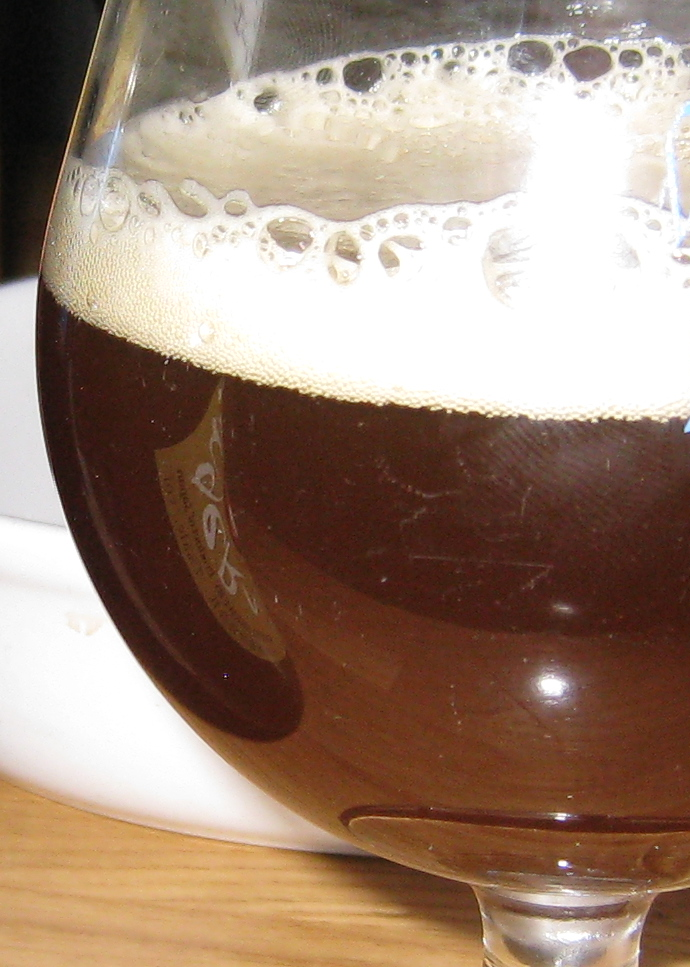
  Kiuchi Brewery's Real Ginger Ale
- Yuzu Lager

=== Sake ===
- Gekkakow
- Kurakagami
- Kurahibiki
- Kurashizuku
- Asamurasaki
- Taruzake

=== Shochu ===
- Kiuchi

== See also ==
- Beer in Japan
