= Hitachi Construction Machinery (Europe) =

Hitachi Construction Machinery (Europe) NV
- Company type: Private company
- Industry: Construction equipment
- Predecessor: Hovers Constructie NV
- Founded: 1968
- Headquarters: Oosterhout, Netherlands
- Area served: Europe, Middle East and Africa
- Owner: Hitachi
- Parent: Hitachi Construction Machinery
- Website: HMCE.com

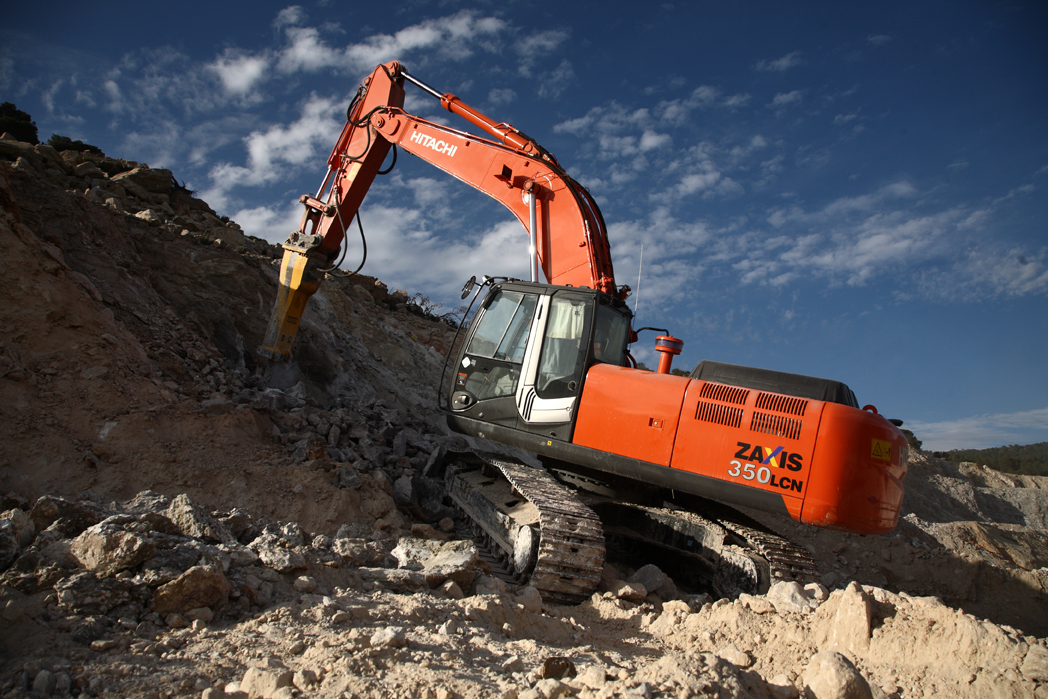
ZX350LCN-3-Photo28-lo

Hitachi Construction Machinery (Europe) NV (HCME) is a subsidiary of Hitachi Construction Machinery Co., Ltd. (HCM) and was established in 1972 in Oosterhout, The Netherlands. It is responsible for the manufacture, sales and marketing of Hitachi construction equipment throughout Europe, Africa and the Middle East.

== History ==
In 1968, Hitachi appointed Hovers Constructie NV in Tilburg, as exclusive importer of Hitachi's range of construction equipment in the Benelux. In the 1970s the company launched a number of locally designed crawler cranes, which had appeal throughout the world.

In 1972 Hovers Constructie NV went out of business. To continue support of existing customer, HCME was incorporated on April 1, 1972, as the first foreign branch of HCM. Responsible for both the manufacture of locally designed products, as well as the distribution of all HCM product through Europe, Africa and the Middle East, in 1981 the company opened a parts Distribution Center.

In 1986 a production, distribution and marketing partnership for plant machinery was agreed between FIAT and Hitachi began, with the original plan to build a limited range of Hitachi crawler excavators in FIAT's factory in San Mauro, Turin, Italy. In the 1990s, HCME increased production at Oosterhout, starting to produce mini excavators, which with an extension of coverage into Russia lead to a trebling of production volumes. In October 1998, Euclid and Hitachi agreed a distribution partnership. This resulted in a new part distribution centre being opened at Oosterhout in April 2000, so that HMCE could take over the exclusive distribution for Euclid dump trucks parts. In March 2001, Hitachi and FIAT terminated their joint venture relationship.

=== HM Plant ===
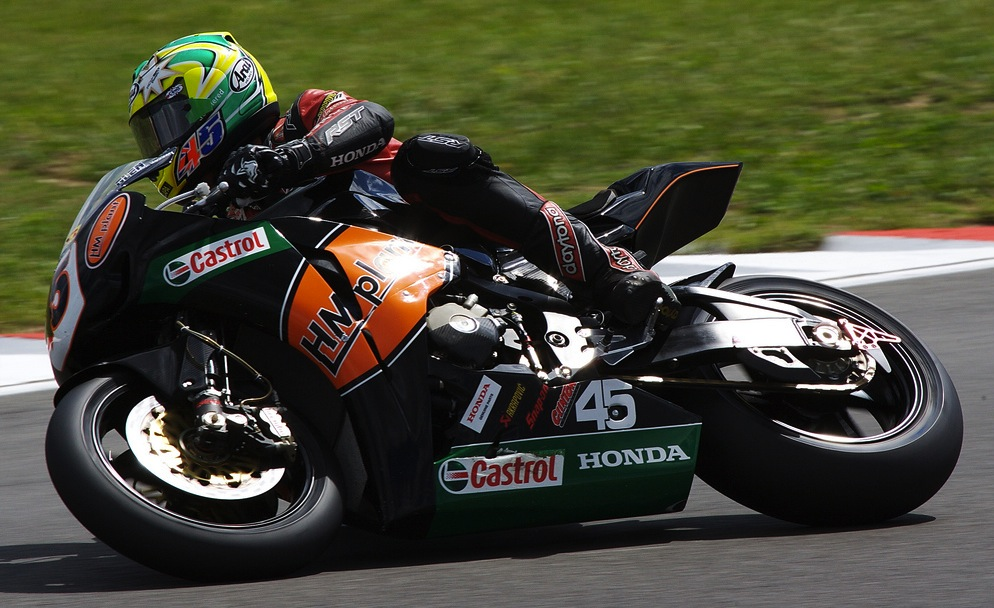
Glen Richards riding the HM Plant-sponsored Honda CBR1000RR in the British Superbike Championship at Snetterton, June 2009

HM Plant was established by Graham Hall in Bridgwater, Somerset, England in 1979, to distribute construction machinery in South West England. The company was appointed a sub-dealer for various brands, including Bomag, Isuzu and FIAT. The company was also appointed a regional sub-dealer for HMCE, but within a year was appointed HMCE's official UK distributor from 1980. After the agreement of the FIAT-Hitachi deal in 1986, the company solely focused on distribution and servicing in the UK of the partnership's products.

In January 2000, a management buyout was led by John Jones. To increase the company's marketing appeal, they began to act as main sponsor for various motorcycle racing based teams and series in the UK, mainly through the British Superbike Championship. Japanese rider Ryuichi Kiyonari won the championship in 2006, 2007 and 2010 riding an HM Plant-sponsored Honda CBR1000RR. In 2004 HM Plant relocated to a purpose-built 7 acres (2.8 ha) site at Hebburn, South Tyneside to allow both easier importation from the Netherlands, and easier distribution around the UK. In April 2007, HM Plant became a wholly owned subsidiary of HMCE, and in May 2014 officially rebranded to Hitachi Construction Machinery (UK) Ltd.

== Present ==
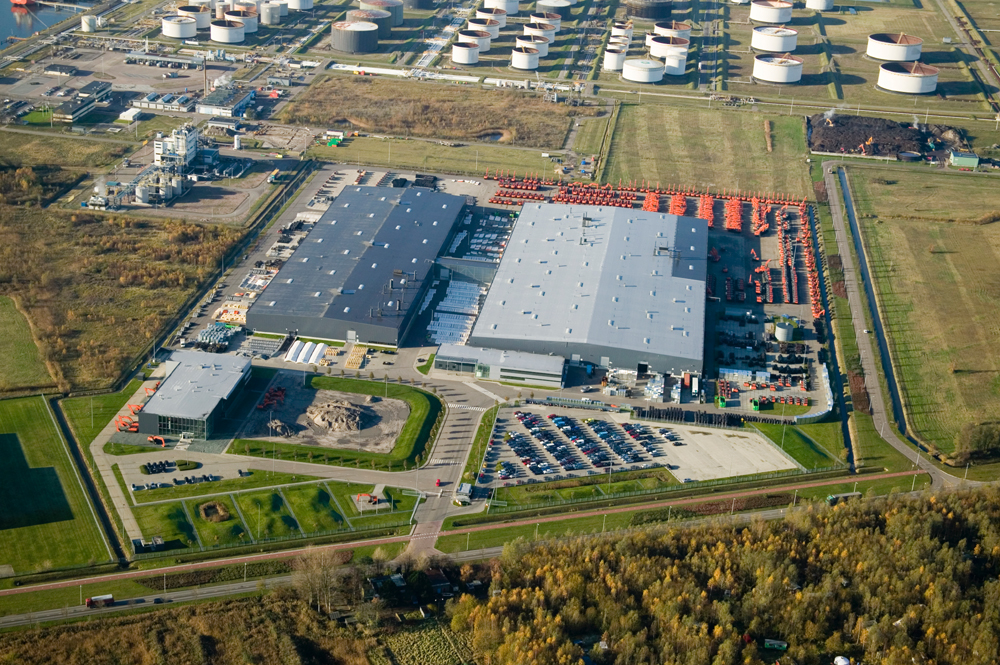
HCME facilities in Amsterdam

The factory was moved to its current site (also in Oosterhout) three years later, when HCME further expanded its operations. In 2002, the Zaxis mini excavator range was introduced to the plant. In the same year, HCME headquarters, including a factory for the construction of medium excavators and a Training and Demonstration Centre, was established in Amsterdam. A wing was added to the existing factory and a new production plant built alongside it in 2006.

== Product range ==
- Excavators
- Wheel loaders
- Dumptrucks (Euclid Trucks)
- Cranes
