= 2013 British Supersport Championship =

The 2013 British Supersport season is the 26th British Supersport Championship season.

== Race calendar and results ==
The 2013 MCE Insurance British Superbike Championship calendar has been announced on 10 October 2012 by MSVR.

2013 calendar
Round		Circuit	Date	Pole position	Fastest lap	Winning rider	Winning team
1	R1	(England) Brands Hatch Indy	5–7 April	(Australia) Billy McConnell	(Northern Ireland) Alastair Seeley	(Scotland) Stuart Easton	Mar-Train Yamaha Racing
1	R2	(England) Brands Hatch Indy	5–7 April		(Australia) Billy McConnell	(Northern Ireland) Alastair Seeley	Gearlink Kawasaki
2	R1	(England) Thruxton	12–14 April	(Scotland) Stuart Easton	(Northern Ireland) Alastair Seeley	(Scotland) Stuart Easton	Mar-Train Yamaha Racing
2	R2	(England) Thruxton	12–14 April		(Northern Ireland) Alastair Seeley	(Scotland) Stuart Easton	Mar-Train Yamaha Racing
3	R1	(England) Oulton Park	4–6 May	(Scotland) Stuart Easton	(Northern Ireland) Alastair Seeley	(Scotland) Stuart Easton	Mar-Train Yamaha Racing
3	R2	(England) Oulton Park	4–6 May		(Northern Ireland) Alastair Seeley	(Northern Ireland) Alastair Seeley	Gearlink Kawasaki
4	R1	(Scotland) Knockhill	14–16 June	(Australia) Billy McConnell	(England) Ben Wilson	(England) Ben Wilson	Gearlink Kawasaki
4	R2	(Scotland) Knockhill	14–16 June		(England) Ben Wilson	(England) Ben Wilson	Gearlink Kawasaki
5	R1	(England) Snetterton 300	5–7 July	(Northern Ireland) Alastair Seeley	(Northern Ireland) Alastair Seeley	(Northern Ireland) Alastair Seeley	Gearlink Kawasaki
5	R2	(England) Snetterton 300	5–7 July		(Northern Ireland) Alastair Seeley	(Northern Ireland) Alastair Seeley	Gearlink Kawasaki
6	R1	(England) Brands Hatch GP	19–21 July	(England) Graeme Gowland	(England) Jake Dixon	(Scotland) Stuart Easton	Mar-Train Yamaha Racing
6	R2	(England) Brands Hatch GP	19–21 July		(Northern Ireland) Alastair Seeley	(Northern Ireland) Alastair Seeley	Gearlink Kawasaki
7	R1	(England) Oulton Park	9–11 August	(Northern Ireland) Alastair Seeley	(England) Ben Wilson	(Scotland) Stuart Easton	Mar-Train Yamaha Racing
7	R2	(England) Oulton Park	9–11 August		(Northern Ireland) Alastair Seeley	(Northern Ireland) Alastair Seeley	Gearlink Kawasaki
8	R1	(England) Cadwell Park	24–26 August	(England) Ben Wilson	(Australia) Billy McConnell	(England) Ben Wilson	Gearlink Kawasaki
8	R2	(England) Cadwell Park	24–26 August		(Australia) Jason O'Halloran	(Australia) Billy McConnell	Smiths Triumph
9	R1	(England) Donington Park	6–8 September	(Scotland) Stuart Easton	(Australia) Glen Richards	(Australia) Billy McConnell	Smiths Triumph
9	R2	(England) Donington Park	6–8 September		(Scotland) Stuart Easton	(Scotland) Stuart Easton	Mar-Train Yamaha Racing
10	R1	(Netherlands) TT Circuit Assen	20–23 September	(England) Richard Cooper	(England) Richard Cooper	(Scotland) Stuart Easton	Mar-Train Yamaha Racing
10	R2	(Netherlands) TT Circuit Assen	20–23 September		(Australia) Jason O'Halloran	(Scotland) Stuart Easton	Mar-Train Yamaha Racing
11	R1	(England) Silverstone Arena GP	4–6 October	(Australia) Jason O'Halloran	(Northern Ireland) Alastair Seeley	(Northern Ireland) Alastair Seeley	Gearlink Kawasaki
11	R2	(England) Silverstone Arena GP	4–6 October		(Northern Ireland) Alastair Seeley	(England) Luke Mossey	Techcare/Profile Triumph
12	R1	(England) Brands Hatch GP	18–20 October	(England) Richard Cooper	(Northern Ireland) Alastair Seeley	(England) Richard Cooper	Oxford TAG Triumph
12	R2	(England) Brands Hatch GP	18–20 October		(Australia) Glen Richards	(Scotland) Stuart Easton	Mar-Train Yamaha Racing

== Championship standings ==
Championship standings
Position	Rider	Team	Points
1	S. Easton	Mar-Train Yamaha	422
2	A. Seeley	Gearlink Kawasaki	409
3	B. McConnell	Smiths Triumph Racing	327
4	B. Wilson	Gearlink Kawasaki	303
5	G. Gowland	Appleyard Macadam Doo.	245
6	J. O'Halloran	Samsung Honda	211
7	R. Cooper	Oxford Tag Triumph	202
8	G. Richards	Smiths Triumph Racing	186
9	G. Irwin	Mar-Train Yamaha	136
10	T. Mackenzie	Tyco Suzuki	128

== Entry list ==
2013 Entry List
Team	Constructor	Motorcycle	Rider
Gearlink Kawasaki	Kawasaki	Kawasaki Ninja ZX-6R	(Northern Ireland) Alastair Seeley
Gearlink Kawasaki	Kawasaki	Kawasaki Ninja ZX-6R	(England) Ben Wilson
RLR Suzuki	Suzuki	Suzuki GSX-R600	(England) Sam Hornsey
Tyco Suzuki	Suzuki	Suzuki GSX-R600	(Scotland) Taylor Mackenzie
WKBikes Hel Performance Suzuki	Suzuki	Suzuki GSX-R600	(Finland) Pauli Pekkanen
Oxford TAG Triumph	Triumph	Triumph Daytona 675	(England) Scott Smart
Oxford TAG Triumph	Triumph	Triumph Daytona 675	(England) Richard Cooper
Oxford TAG Triumph	Triumph	Triumph Daytona 675	(Northern Ireland) John Simpson
Oxford TAG Triumph	Triumph	Triumph Daytona 675	(England) Shaun Winfield
CF Motorsport	Yamaha	Yamaha YZF-R6	(England) Jake Dixon
Mar-Train Yamaha Racing	Yamaha	Yamaha YZF-R6	(Scotland) Stuart Easton
Mar-Train Yamaha Racing	Yamaha	Yamaha YZF-R6	(Northern Ireland) Glenn Irwin
Milwaukee Yamaha	Yamaha	Yamaha YZF-R6	(Northern Ireland) William Dunlop
Seton Tuning Yamaha	Yamaha	Yamaha YZF-R6	(England) Graeme Gowland
