= 2002 British Superbike Championship =

British Superbike Championship

The 2002 British Superbike season was the 15th British Superbike Championship season.

Motorcycle News renewed their series sponsorship since the revitalization in the 1996 season so the series was again called the MCN British Superbike Championship.

2002 was the first year in which the new 1000cc four-cylinder machines (according to Superstock regulation) were allowed to compete against the established 750cc four-cylinder and 1000cc two-cylinder (Superbike-Spec) bikes. This was introduced to reduce costs, and it was supposed to enlarge the grid size. For this reason, the more varied grid meant there was no Privateers' Cup.

Steve Hislop became the 2002 BSB Champion on board the MonsterMob sponsored Paul Bird Motorsport Ducati 998 RS.

== Calendar ==
2002 British Superbike Championship Calendar
Round		Circuit	Date	Pole position	Fastest lap	Winning rider	Winning team	Ref
1	R1	(England) Silverstone International	1 April	(Scotland) Steve Hislop	(Scotland) Steve Hislop	(England) Sean Emmett	IFC Racing Ducati	
1	R2	(England) Silverstone International	1 April	(Scotland) Steve Hislop	(Scotland) Steve Hislop	(Scotland) Steve Hislop	MonsterMob Ducati	
2	R1	(England) Brands Hatch Indy	14 April	(Scotland) Steve Hislop	(Scotland) Steve Hislop	(Scotland) Steve Hislop	MonsterMob Ducati	
2	R2	(England) Brands Hatch Indy	14 April	(Scotland) Steve Hislop	(England) John Reynolds	(Scotland) Steve Hislop	MonsterMob Ducati	
3	R1	(England) Donington Park	28 April	(England) Michael Rutter	(England) Michael Rutter	(England) Shane Byrne	Renegade Ducati	
3	R2	(England) Donington Park	28 April	(England) Michael Rutter	(England) Sean Emmett	(England) Michael Rutter	Renegade Ducati	
4	R1	(England) Oulton Park	6 May	(England) Michael Rutter	(Scotland) Steve Hislop	(Scotland) Steve Hislop	MonsterMob Ducati	
4	R2	(England) Oulton Park	6 May	(England) Michael Rutter	(Scotland) Steve Hislop	(England) Michael Rutter *	Renegade Ducati	
5	R1	(England) Snetterton	3 June	(England) Sean Emmett	(England) Sean Emmett	(England) Sean Emmett	IFC Racing Ducati	
5	R2	(England) Snetterton	3 June	(England) Sean Emmett	(England) Sean Emmett	(England) Sean Emmett	IFC Racing Ducati	
6	R1	(England) Brands Hatch GP	16 June	(England) Sean Emmett	(England) Shane Byrne	(England) John Reynolds	Rizla Suzuki	
6	R2	(England) Brands Hatch GP	16 June	(England) Sean Emmett	(England) John Reynolds	(England) Sean Emmett	IFC Racing Ducati	
7	R1	(England) Rockingham	23 June	(England) John Reynolds	(England) Michael Rutter	(England) Michael Rutter	Renegade Ducati	
7	R2	(England) Rockingham	23 June	(England) John Reynolds	(Scotland) Steve Hislop	(England) Michael Rutter	Renegade Ducati	
8	R1	(Scotland) Knockhill	7 July	(England) Michael Rutter	(Scotland) Steve Hislop	(Scotland) Steve Hislop	MonsterMob Ducati	
8	R2	(Scotland) Knockhill	7 July	(England) Michael Rutter	(Scotland) Steve Hislop	(England) Shane Byrne	Renegade Ducati	
9	R1	(England) Thruxton	11 August	(England) Michael Rutter	(England) Sean Emmett	(England) Michael Rutter	Renegade Ducati	
9	R2	(England) Thruxton	11 August	(England) Michael Rutter	(England) Shane Byrne	(England) Shane Byrne	Renegade Ducati	
10	R1	(England) Cadwell Park	26 August	(Scotland) Steve Hislop	(Scotland) Steve Hislop	(Scotland) Steve Hislop	MonsterMob Ducati	
10	R2	(England) Cadwell Park	26 August	(Scotland) Steve Hislop	(Scotland) Steve Hislop	(Scotland) Steve Hislop	MonsterMob Ducati	
11	R1	(England) Oulton Park	1 September	(Scotland) Steve Hislop	(Scotland) Steve Hislop	(Scotland) Steve Hislop	MonsterMob Ducati	
11	R2	(England) Oulton Park	1 September	(Scotland) Steve Hislop	(Scotland) Steve Hislop	(England) Steve Plater	Virgin Mobile Aiwa Yamaha	
12	R1	(England) Mallory Park	15 September	(England) Michael Rutter	(England) Shane Byrne	(England) Steve Plater	Virgin Mobile Aiwa Yamaha	
12	R2	(England) Mallory Park	15 September	(England) Michael Rutter	(England) Michael Rutter	(England) Michael Rutter	Renegade Ducati	
13	R1	(England) Donington Park	29 September	(Scotland) Steve Hislop	(Australia) Glen Richards	(England) Michael Rutter	Renegade Ducati	
13	R2	(England) Donington Park	29 September	(Scotland) Steve Hislop	(Scotland) Steve Hislop	(England) Michael Rutter	Renegade Ducati	

== Entry list ==
2002 British Superbike Championship Entry List
Team	Bike	No	Riders	Class	Rounds
Rizla Suzuki	Suzuki GSX-R1000	1	(England) John Reynolds		All
Rizla Suzuki	Suzuki GSX-R1000	11	(England) Karl Harris		1–4, 9–13
Rizla Suzuki	Suzuki GSX-R1000	11	(Italy) Giovanni Bussei		5–6
Rizla Suzuki	Suzuki GSX-R1000	11	(England) David Jefferies		7–8
Rizla Suzuki	Suzuki GSX-R1000	111	(England) Nick Medd		1–6
MonsterMob Ducati	Ducati 998R	2	(Scotland) Steve Hislop		All
IFC Racing	Ducati 998R	3	(England) Sean Emmett		1–8
IFC Racing	Ducati 998R	5	(England) Paul Brown		1–8
Virgin Mobile Aiwa Yamaha	Yamaha YZF-R1	3	(England) Sean Emmett		9–13
Virgin Mobile Aiwa Yamaha	Yamaha YZF-R1	4	(England) Steve Plater		All
Virgin Mobile Aiwa Yamaha	Yamaha YZF-R1	9	(New Zealand) Simon Crafar		All
ETI Racing	Suzuki GSX-R1000	7	(Scotland) John Crawford		1, 5–6, 8–13
ETI Racing	Suzuki GSX-R1000	7	(England) David Jefferies		2
ETI Racing	Suzuki GSX-R1000	7	(Scotland) Ross McCulloch		4
D&B Racing	Ducati 998R	5	(England) Paul Brown		13
D&B Racing	Ducati 996RS	12	(England) Dean Ellison		All
Team Renegade Ducati	Ducati 998R	6	(England) Michael Rutter		All
Team Renegade Ducati	Ducati 998R	8	(England) Shane Byrne		All
Marshall Tufflex	Honda & Yamaha	10	(England) Lee Jackson		All
Padgett's Racing Suzuki	Suzuki GSX-R1000	14	(England) Marty Nutt		3–8
Padgett's Racing Suzuki	Suzuki GSX-R1000	19	(England) Adrian Coates		5–13
Padgett's Racing Suzuki	Suzuki GSX-R1000	88	(England) Phil Giles		1–4, 10–13
Padgett's Racing Suzuki	Suzuki GSX-R1000	88	(England) John Crockford		9
Team Motopower Firehawk	Honda CBR900RR	14	(England) Matt Llewellyn		1, 5–7
Team Motopower Firehawk	Honda CBR900RR	14	(England) Marty Nutt		9–13
Team Motopower Firehawk	Honda CBR900RR	15	(England) Gary Mason		All
Team Motopower Firehawk	Honda CBR900RR	114	(Scotland) Jim Moodie		6
DBK Racing	Honda & Yamaha	16	(England) Peter Berwick		1–5, 7, 9
TW2 Racing Team Shark	Suzuki & Yamaha	17	(England) Jason Davis		All
BSD Racing Performance Bikes	Suzuki	20	(England) Simon Smith		13
Hawk Kawasaki	Kawasaki ZX-7RR	22	(England) Mark Burr		All
Hawk Kawasaki	Kawasaki ZX-7RR	75	(Australia) Glen Richards		All
Phones4u DiEnza Performance Ducati	Ducati 996RS	23	(Australia) Dean Thomas		All
Virgin Mobile Team Appleyard	Yamaha YZF-R7	24	(South Africa) Shane Norval		1–9
Virgin Mobile Team Appleyard	Yamaha YZF-R7	25	(England) Paul Jones		1–3, 5–8, 10–11
Fibreone Tech Suzuki	Suzuki GSX-R1000	31	(England) Tony Waistnage		9
Fibreone Tech Suzuki	Suzuki GSX-R1000	111	(England) Nick Medd		9–12
Huggys Speedshop Gouverner's Bridge	Suzuki	33	(England) Tristan Palmer		12
Team Powersport Racing	Honda	49	(Republic of Ireland) Hilton Hinks		9, 12
PR Racing	Honda	68	(England) Gordon Blackley		2–7, 9–13
Spidi JRRA Motorsport Honda	Honda	77	(England) Jamie Robinson		1–12
Pirelli Grafters Race Team	Suzuki GSX-R1000	96	(Australia) Paul Young		1, 5–12
Pirelli Grafters Race Team	Suzuki GSX-R1000	97	(England) Jon Kirkham		3–4, 5–9, 13
Pirelli Grafters Race Team	Suzuki GSX-R1000	98	(England) Neil Faulkner		1–6

Key
Regular Rider
Wildcard Rider
Replacement Rider

== Championship Standings ==
Points system
Position	1st	2nd	3rd	4th	5th	6th	7th	8th	9th	10th	11th	12th	13th	14th	15th
Race	25	20	16	13	11	10	9	8	7	6	5	4	3	2	1

=== Riders' Championship ===
2002 British Superbike Riders' Championship
Pos	Rider	Bike	SIL (England)		BRH (England)		DON (England)		OUL (England)		SNE (England)		BRH (England)		ROC (England)		KNO (Scotland)		THR (England)		CAD (England)		OUL (England)		MAL (England)		DON (England)		Pts
Pos	Rider	Bike	R1	R2	R1	R2	R1	R2	R1	R2*	R1	R2	R1	R2	R1	R2	R1	R2	R1	R2	R1	R2	R1	R2	R1	R2	R1	R2	Pts
1	(Scotland) Steve Hislop	Ducati	2	1	1	1	3	6	1	2	4	2	12	2	2	4	1	7	2	2	1	1	1	Ret	5	6	3	2	452
2	(England) Michael Rutter	Ducati	7	4	7	4	4	1	2	1	Ret	3	3	3	1	1	3	Ret	1	Ret	3	2	3	5	3	1	1	1	407.5
3	(England) Sean Emmett	Ducati	1	3	4	2	5	4	3	3	1	1	Ret	1	3	2	2	3	3	3	5	6	9	6	2	2	Ret		379
4	(England) Shane Byrne	Ducati	5	Ret	5	7	1	2	8	7	Ret	5	9	5	4	5	Ret	1	6	1	2	3	2	Ret	4	4	Ret	5	294.5
5	(England) Steve Plater	Yamaha	3	6	6	6	2	7	6	10	3	4	2	6	Ret	Ret	Ret	5	7	4	Ret	5	4	1	1	3	Ret	3	286
6	(England) John Reynolds	Ducati	4	2	2	3	Ret		5	5	2	Ret	1	4	6	Ret	5	4	4	Ret	4	4	8	2	Ret	7	2	6	283.5
7	(Australia) Glen Richards	Kawasaki	10	7	Ret	Ret	6	8	10	9	NC	8	6	11	7	6	8	6	8	5	7	Ret	6	Ret	5	6	4	4	187.5
8	(New Zealand) Simon Crafar	Yamaha	9	8	9	9	Ret	3	11	12	6	7	5	9	11	Ret	6	9	5	7	6	Ret	17	3	9	10	5	10	187
9	(England) Paul Brown	Ducati	8	5	3	5	9	5	4	4	5	6	4	7	WD		4	2									Ret	12	163.5
10	(England) Dean Ellison	Ducati	13	10	12	Ret	8	10	9	11	8	9	7	10	10	10	10	10	15	Ret	12	10	13	12	10	Ret	8	7	131.5
11	(Australia) Dean Thomas	Ducati	Ret	9	Ret	8	7	9	Ret	8	9	Ret	10	DNS	5	3	Ret	8	9	8	Ret	DNS	10	8	12	14	9	11	130
12	(England) Karl Harris	Suzuki	6	Ret	8	Ret	Ret	12	7	6									12	6	8	7	5	4	7	8	7	Ret	117
13	(Scotland) John Crawford	Suzuki	Ret	Ret			WD				Ret	DNS	11	Ret			Ret	Ret	10	9	10	8	7	7	8	9	6	8	83
14	(England) Gary Mason	Honda	15	Ret	10	10	Ret	Ret	12	13	Ret	Ret	Ret	Ret	15	Ret	Ret	DNS	13	Ret	9	Ret	Ret	10	13	11	10	9	56.5
15	(England) Paul Jones	Yamaha	11	11	11	Ret	10	Ret			Ret	10	16	13	14	14	9	12			15	12	WD						50
16	(England) Mark Burr	Kawasaki	17	13	16	17	Ret	16	14	16	11	19	15	12	Ret	9	14	13	14	10	11	9	Ret		16	16	Ret	14	49
17	(Australia) Paul Young	Suzuki	14	Ret							Ret	17	22	19	12	11	17	14	Ret	14	13	11	11	9	11	12			44
18	(South Africa) Shane Norval	Yamaha	21	15	15	12	13	11	15	14	13	13	19	15	13	12	16	Ret	17	12									34
19	(England) David Jefferies	Suzuki			13	11									9	8	7	Ret											32
20	(Italy) Giovanni Bussei	Suzuki									7	11	8	8															30
20	(England) Jamie Morley	Suzuki	12	16	14	Ret	Ret	Ret				14	Ret	8	7	Ret	11												30
22	(Northern Ireland) Adrian Coates	Suzuki									10	12	13	17	Ret	16	Ret	Ret	21	Ret	16	Ret	12	11	15	13	14	Ret	28
23	(England) Phil Giles	Suzuki	Ret	DNS	20	14	12	Ret	16	19											14	14	14	13	14	15	11	13	26
24	(England) Jamie Robinson	Honda	18	14	Ret	18	11	Ret	17	17	12	14	18	14	Ret	Ret	15	Ret	19	15	Ret	16	15	14	18	Ret			20
25	(England) Jason Davis	Yamaha	20	17	18	15	14	17	19	15	15	16	17	18	16	13	13	15	16	11	17	13	16	Ret	17	Ret	Ret	16	19.5
26	(England) Lee Jackson	Yamaha	16	12	17	13	Ret	Ret	18	18	Ret	15	21	16	20	17	Ret	16	18	13	18	15	Ret	15	19	17	12	15	18
27	(England) Marty Nutt	Honda					15	14	29	21	14	Ret	20	20	19	15	11	17	Ret	Ret	19	17	19	16	20	20	Ret	Ret	11
28	(England) Jon Kirkham	Suzuki					Ret	Ret	21	20	16	18	24	21	17	Ret	12	Ret	22	16							13	17	7
29	(England) John Crockford	Suzuki																	11	Ret									5
30	(England) Neil Faulkner	Suzuki	23	20	Ret	DNS	17	13	Ret	DNS	DNS	Ret	Ret	Ret	WD														3
30	(Scotland) Ross McCulloch	Suzuki							13	DNS																			3
32	(England) Gordon Blackley	Honda	19	Ret	21	Ret	16	15	22	22	18	Ret	25	22	Ret	18			23	Ret	21	18	18	17	Ret	DNS	16	19	1
32	(England) Simon Smith	Suzuki																									15	20	1
	(England) Nick Medd	Suzuki	Ret	18	19	16	Ret	Ret	WD		17	Ret	Ret	23					25	18	20	Ret	Ret	DNS	DNS	DNS	WD		0
	(Republic of Ireland) Hilton Hinks	Honda																	20	17			DNS		23	21			0
	(England) Matt Llewellyn	Honda	Ret	Ret	WD								Ret	DNS	23	Ret	18	Ret											0
	(England) Peter Berwick	Yamaha	22	19	Ret	Ret	Ret	Ret	Ret	Ret	Ret	Ret			WD			Ret	Ret										0
	(England) Tristan Palmer	Suzuki																							21	19			0
	(England) Tony Waistnage	Suzuki																	24	19									0
	(Scotland) Jim Moodie	Honda											Ret	Ret															0
Pos	Rider	Bike	SIL (England)		BRH (England)		DON (England)		OUL (England)		SNE (England)		BRH (England)		ROC (England)		KNO (Scotland)		THR (England)		CAD (England)		OUL (England)		MAL (England)		DON (England)		Pts

Colour	Result
Gold	Winner
Silver	Second place
Bronze	Third place
Green	Points classification
Blue	Non-points classification
Blue	Non-classified finish (NC)
Purple	Retired, not classified (Ret)
Red	Did not qualify (DNQ)
Red	Did not pre-qualify (DNPQ)
Black	Disqualified (DSQ)
White	Did not start (DNS)
White	Withdrew (WD)
White	Race cancelled (C)
Blank	Did not practice (DNP)
Blank	Did not arrive (DNA)
Blank	Excluded (EX)

Notes:

- - Half points were awarded at the fourth Event at the Oulton Park Round 2 race as less than 75% of the scheduled distance was completed.

=== Teams Championship ===
2002 British Superbike Teams' Championship
Pos	Team	Bike	SIL (England)			BRH (England)			DON (England)			OUL (England)			SNE (England)			BRH (England)			ROC (England)			KNO (Scotland)			THR (England)			CAD (England)			OUL (England)			MAL (England)			DON (England)			Pts
Pos	Team	Bike	Q	R1	R2	Q	R1	R2	Q	R1	R2	Q	R1	R2	Q	R1	R2	Q	R1	R2	Q	R1	R2	Q	R1	R2	Q	R1	R2	Q	R1	R2	Q	R1	R2	Q	R1	R2	Q	R1	R2	Pts
1	(England) Team Renegade Ducati	Ducati	41	50	32	53	50	51	58	57	59	57	52	54	55	15	54	53	50	54	52	57	56	59	36	43	58	55	41	57	57	57	56	57	37	58	55	57	57	38	56	1994
2	(England) MonsterMob Ducati	Ducati	44	47	51	49	49	37	48	51	46	49	52	49	53	50	51	48	43	50	44	50	48	41	52	45	38	45	42	46	49	51	51	48	31	52	46	37	53	51	53	1839
3	(England) Rizla Crescent Suzuki	Suzuki	59	52	36	48	52	39	49	16	19	48	50	51	59	53	29	44	53	50	48	47	32	28	50	39	56	46	37	46	50	51	51	49	56	51	33	47	48	53	34	1741
4	(England) Virgin Mobile Aiwa Yamaha	Yamaha	44	50	48	38	47	47	45	38	52	38	45	40	40	53	51	39	55	47	41	27	23	44	31	48	45	50	51	50	34	38	46	41	58	41	52	49	35	35	49	1705
5	(England) Hawk Kawasaki	Kawasaki	35	35	42	35	23	24	38	33	38	37	38	37	29	31	36	37	41	39	46	34	47	50	40	43	44	40	47	41	44	32	41	32	9	41	41	40	36	37	44	1457
6	(England) IFC Racing	Ducati	48	53	54	55	55	55	53	48	53	54	55	55	50	56	55	54	30	54	44	28	29	50	56	57													25	11	19	1256
7	(Italy) DiEnza JRRA Motorsport	Ducati	33	19	39	31	16	36	33	44	28	37	22	37	32	41	25	34	34	17	31	37	35	34	28	34	32	34	39	36	15	15	30	37	40	24	32	26	20	22	20	1179
8	(England) Virgin Mobile Yamaha	Yamaha	23	30	36	34	36	26	28	39	33	16	16	17	29	24	39	22	27	34	31	35	36	27	37	29	39	42	47	42	42	44	32	22	25	26	29	29	26	12		1161
9	(England) Padgett's Suzuki	Suzuki	24	22	15	20	28	26	26	35	25	14	26	22	20	38	26	20	29	25	21	22	31	29	27	23	25	31	15	20	32	26	25	36	38	25	33	34	28	37	29	1028
10	(England) Marshall Tuflex TW2 Motorsport	Yamaha	20	26	33	16	27	34	18	28	25	23	25	29	17	20	31	17	24	28	21	27	32	18	28	31	29	28	38	28	27	34	24	25	26	27	26	24	30	33	31	1028
11	(England) Team Motopower Firehawk	Honda	27	20	17	31	21	21	25	11	19	19	19	18	43	23	5	37	13	12	31	30	18	24	13		28	23	16	31	34	25	33	21	36	33	29	32	33	34	32	937
12	(England) ETI Racing	Suzuki	40	12	19	29	30	35	9	12	9	26	18		22	27	11	25	26	15				6	11	8	26	29	36	26	32	31	23	35	24	27	33	22	26	25	23	798
13	(England) Pirelli Grafters	Suzuki	24	25	15	4	6		18	19	28	20	16	11	14	5	20	11	13	17	15	19	20	23	33	24	24	17	32	14	18	20	31	28	35	31	30	32	19	33	27	791
14	(England) DBK PR Racing	Honda	9	21	22	16	15	19	14	28	21	17	16	17	8	23	22	4	7	10	11	8	13				11	15	14	7	10	13	7	13	14	8	8		8	16	12	477
15	(England) IFC Junior Team	Ducati																17	17	7	23	23	24	17	9	20																157
Pos	Team	Bike	SIL (England)			BRH (England)			DON (England)			OUL (England)			SNE (England)			BRH (England)			ROC (England)			KNO (Scotland)			THR (England)			CAD (England)			OUL (England)			MAL (England)			DON (England)			Pts

Colour	Result
Gold	Winner
Silver	Second place
Bronze	Third place
Green	Points classification
Blue	Non-points classification
Blue	Non-classified finish (NC)
Purple	Retired, not classified (Ret)
Red	Did not qualify (DNQ)
Red	Did not pre-qualify (DNPQ)
Black	Disqualified (DSQ)
White	Did not start (DNS)
White	Withdrew (WD)
White	Race cancelled (C)
Blank	Did not practice (DNP)
Blank	Did not arrive (DNA)
Blank	Excluded (EX)

=== Manufacturers' Championship ===
2002 British Superbike Manufacturers' Championship
Pos	Manufacturer	Bike	SIL (England)		BRH (England)		DON (England)		OUL (England)		SNE (England)		BRH (England)		ROC (England)		KNO (Scotland)		THR (England)		CAD (England)		OUL (England)		MAL (England)		DON (England)		Pts
Pos	Manufacturer	Bike	R1	R2	R1	R2	R1	R2	R1	R2	R1	R2	R1	R2	R1	R2	R1	R2	R1	R2	R1	R2	R1	R2	R1	R2	R1	R2	Pts
1	(Italy) Ducati	Ducati	1	1	1	1	1	1	1	1	1	1	3	1	1	1	1	1	1	1	1	1	1	5	3	1	1	1	605.5
2	(Japan) Yamaha	Yamaha	3	6	6	6	2	3	6	10	3	4	2	6	11	12	6	5	3	3	5	5	4	1	1	2	5	3	348
3	(Japan) Suzuki	Suzuki	4	2	2	3	12	12	5	5	2	11	1	4	6	8	5	4	4	6	4	4	5	2	7	7	2	6	326.5
4	(Japan) Kawasaki	Kawasaki	10	7	Ret	Ret	6	8	10	9	11	8	6	11	7	6	8	6	8	5	7	9	6	Ret	5	6	4	4	199.5
5	(Japan) Honda	Honda	15	12	10	10	11	15	12	13	12	14	Ret	14	15	Ret	15	Ret	13	15	9	Ret	15	10	13	11	10	9	77.5
Pos	Manufacturer	Bike	SIL (England)		BRH (England)		DON (England)		OUL (England)		SNE (England)		BRH (England)		ROC (England)		KNO (Scotland)		THR (England)		CAD (England)		OUL (England)		MAL (England)		DON (England)		Pts

Colour	Result
Gold	Winner
Silver	Second place
Bronze	Third place
Green	Points classification
Blue	Non-points classification
Blue	Non-classified finish (NC)
Purple	Retired, not classified (Ret)
Red	Did not qualify (DNQ)
Red	Did not pre-qualify (DNPQ)
Black	Disqualified (DSQ)
White	Did not start (DNS)
White	Withdrew (WD)
White	Race cancelled (C)
Blank	Did not practice (DNP)
Blank	Did not arrive (DNA)
Blank	Excluded (EX)
