= 2011 British Supersport Championship =

The 2011 Fuchs-Silkolene British Supersport Championship season was the 24th running of the British Supersport Championship. The supersport series is made up of 2 classes Supersport and Supersport cup, the cup is for younger competitors who are finding their way into the series. Supersport motorcycles have 600cc engines and are allowed to be tuned, after market parts and racing parts can be added to the bikes to elevate it above the feeder Superstock series.
For the 2011 season, the Supersport bikes will have two races per meeting for the first time, one on the Saturday which will be 75% of the full race distance and one on Sunday which will be full race distance. Full points will count in both races.
With 2010 Champion Sam Lowes moving to the World Supersport Championship and runner up James Westmoreland moving up to British Superbike Championship the field was wide open for the returning Alastair Seeley riding the new Suzuki Supersport bike.
It would turn out to be a battle between Seeley and Ben Wilson throughout the season with tight elbow to elbow racing at all rounds, Seeley would eventually come out on top in the last race of the year to win the Supersport Championship by a single point.

== Calendar ==
2011 Calendar
Round		Circuit	Date	Pole position	Fastest lap	Winning rider	Winning team
1	R1	(England) Brands Hatch Indy	24 April	(England) Ben Wilson	(England) Ben Wilson	(England) Ben Wilson	Gearlink Kawasaki
1	R2	(England) Brands Hatch Indy	25 April		(Northern Ireland) Lee Johnston	(Northern Ireland) Alastair Seeley	Relentless Suzuki
2	R1	(England) Oulton Park	1 May	(Northern Ireland) Alastair Seeley	(England) Ben Wilson	(England) Ben Wilson	Gearlink Kawasaki
2	R2	(England) Oulton Park	2 May		(Northern Ireland) Alastair Seeley	(England) Ben Wilson	Gearlink Kawasaki
3	R1	(England) Croft	14 May	(England) Ben Wilson	(England) Steve Plater	(England) Ben Wilson	Gearlink Kawasaki
3	R2	(England) Croft	15 May		(Australia) Billy McConnell	(England) Ben Wilson	Gearlink Kawasaki
4	R1	(England) Thruxton	29 May	(Australia) Billy McConnell	(Republic of Ireland) Jack Kennedy	(Australia) Billy McConnell	Oxford TAG Triumph
4	R2	(England) Thruxton	30 May		(Northern Ireland) Alastair Seeley	(Australia) Paul Young	Oxford TAG Triumph
5	R1	(Scotland) Knockhill	18 June	(England) Sam Warren	(England) Sam Warren	(England) Sam Warren	Bike Interceptor/Seton Yamaha
5	R2	(Scotland) Knockhill	19 June		(England) Ben Wilson	(England) Ben Wilson	Gearlink Kawasaki
6	R1	(England) Snetterton 300	2 July	(Northern Ireland) Alastair Seeley	(Northern Ireland) Alastair Seeley	(Northern Ireland) Alastair Seeley	Relentless Suzuki
6	R2	(England) Snetterton 300	3 July		(Northern Ireland) Alastair Seeley	(Northern Ireland) Alastair Seeley	Relentless Suzuki
7	R1	(England) Oulton Park	16 July	(Australia) Billy McConnell	(England) Ben Wilson	(Australia) Billy McConnell	Oxford TAG Triumph
7	R2	(England) Oulton Park	17 July	Race Cancelled^{1}			
8	R1	(England) Brands Hatch GP	6 August	(Northern Ireland) Alastair Seeley	(England) Ben Wilson	(Northern Ireland) Alastair Seeley	Relentless Suzuki
8	R2	(England) Brands Hatch GP	7 August		(Northern Ireland) Alastair Seeley	(Northern Ireland) Alastair Seeley	Relentless Suzuki
9	R1	(England) Cadwell Park	28 August	(England) Ben Wilson	(England) Ben Wilson	(England) Ben Wilson	Gearlink Kawasaki
9	R2	(England) Cadwell Park	29 August		(England) Ben Wilson	(England) Ben Wilson	Gearlink Kawasaki
10	R1	(England) Donington Park	10 September	(Northern Ireland) Alastair Seeley	(Northern Ireland) Alastair Seeley	(Northern Ireland) Alastair Seeley	Relentless Suzuki
10	R2	(England) Donington Park	11 September		(Northern Ireland) Alastair Seeley	(Northern Ireland) Alastair Seeley	Relentless Suzuki
11	R1	(England) Silverstone Arena GP	24 September	(Northern Ireland) Alastair Seeley	(Australia) Paul Young	(Northern Ireland) Alastair Seeley	Relentless Suzuki
11	R2	(England) Silverstone Arena GP	25 September		(England) Sam Warren	(Northern Ireland) Alastair Seeley	Relentless Suzuki
12	R1	(England) Brands Hatch GP	8 October		(Northern Ireland) Alastair Seeley	(England) Ben Wilson	Gearlink Kawasaki
12	R2	(England) Brands Hatch GP	9 October	(Northern Ireland) Alastair Seeley	(England) Christian Iddon	(Republic of Ireland) Jack Kennedy	Colin Appleyard/Macadam Racing
12	R3	(England) Brands Hatch GP	9 October		(Northern Ireland) Alastair Seeley	(Northern Ireland) Alastair Seeley	Relentless Suzuki

Notes:

1. – The second race at Oulton Park was cancelled due to bad weather conditions. As a result, the race was run at the final round of the championship at Brands Hatch, with the second race grid positions standing for the race.

== Entry list ==
2011 Entry List
Team	Bike	No.	Riders	Class	Rounds
Smiths (Gloucester) Racing	Triumph Daytona 675	2	(England) Josh Day		9–12
Smiths (Gloucester) Racing	Triumph Daytona 675	12	(England) Luke Mossey		1–8, 11–12
Smiths (Gloucester) Racing	Triumph Daytona 675	13	(Northern Ireland) Lee Johnston		10
Smiths (Gloucester) Racing	Triumph Daytona 675	20	(England) Daniel Cooper		1–8, 12
Smiths (Gloucester) Racing	Triumph Daytona 675	51	(England) Matthew Whitman		1–9, 11–12
Team Rogers Racing; ANR TSS Racing	Yamaha YZF-R6	3	(England) Anthony Rogers	C	4, 6–9, 11–12
Team Rogers Racing; ANR TSS Racing	Triumph Daytona 675	22	(England) Jonathan Lodge	C	12
Colin Appleyard/Macadam Racing	Yamaha YZF-R6	4	(Republic of Ireland) Jack Kennedy		1–4, 8–12
Colin Appleyard/Macadam Racing	Yamaha YZF-R6	24	(Scotland) Kev Coghlan		7
East Coast Racing	Honda CBR600RR	5	(England) Gary Johnson		1–3, 5–11
East Coast Racing	Honda CBR600RR	13	(Northern Ireland) Lee Johnston		1–3, 5–8
Wilson Craig Racing	Honda CBR600RR	6	(Northern Ireland) William Dunlop	C	11
Profile Bournemouth Kawasaki Team	Kawasaki Ninja ZX-6R	8	(England) Luke Stapleford		All
ABSOL Racing	Triumph Daytona 675	9	(Republic of Ireland) Emmet O'Grady	C	2, 4–5, 7–8, 10, 12
Manx Glass and Glazing	Honda CBR600RR	10	(England) Jenny Tinmouth		5–12
T3 Racing	Triumph Daytona 675	11	(Northern Ireland) John Simpson	C	1–11
T3 Racing	Triumph Daytona 675	60	(England) Tom Hayward	C	11
MAP Triumph	Triumph Daytona 675	14	(England) Josh Caygill		All
MAP Triumph	Triumph Daytona 675	39	(South Africa) Allan Jon Venter		All
MAP Triumph	Triumph Daytona 675	95	(England) Jimmy Hill		1–2, 7–12
Gearlink Kawasaki	Kawasaki Ninja ZX-6R	15	(England) Ben Wilson		All
Gearlink Kawasaki	Kawasaki Ninja ZX-6R	17	(England) Jesse Trayler		1–8
Gearlink Kawasaki	Kawasaki Ninja ZX-6R	32	(England) Matthew Hoyle	C	11–12
Gearlink Kawasaki	Kawasaki Ninja ZX-6R	89	(Wales) David Jones		9–12
www.padgetts-motorcycles.co.uk	Honda CBR600RR	16	(England) Ben Padgett	C	1–8
www.padgetts-motorcycles.co.uk	Honda CBR600RR	22	(England) Steve Plater		1–4
www.padgetts-motorcycles.co.uk	Honda CBR600RR	77	(Northern Ireland) Marty Nutt		11–12
Aye Gee Suzuki Racing	Suzuki GSX-R600	17	(England) Jesse Trayler		10–12
Grant Racing/Alan Duffus Motorcycles	Yamaha YZF-R6	19	(Scotland) Scott Kelly	C	1–3
Grant Racing/Alan Duffus Motorcycles	Kawasaki Ninja ZX-6R	93	(England) Jamie Perrin	C	11–12
Oxford TAG Triumph	Triumph Daytona 675	21	(England) Christian Iddon		All
Oxford TAG Triumph	Triumph Daytona 675	41	(England) Shaun Winfield	C	All
Oxford TAG Triumph	Triumph Daytona 675	75	(Australia) Billy McConnell		All
Oxford TAG Triumph	Triumph Daytona 675	96	(Australia) Paul Young		All
Ben Field Racing	Honda CBR600RR	23	(England) Ben Field	C	10
Wilcock Consulting	Honda CBR600RR	27	(England) Dan Stewart	C	11
Mackrory Racing	Kawasaki Ninja ZX-6R	27	(England) Michael Howarth		1–2
Mackrory Racing	Kawasaki Ninja ZX-6R	32	(England) Matthew Hoyle	C	3–9
Mackrory Racing	Kawasaki Ninja ZX-6R	55	(England) Ashley Beech		10
Mackrory Racing	Kawasaki Ninja ZX-6R	66	(England) James Webb		11–12
MotoDex Performance First	Yamaha YZF-R6	29	(United States) Melissa Paris	C	12
Team LCS	Yamaha YZF-R6	29	(England) Mark Lister	C	9
Team LCS	Yamaha YZF-R6	129	(England) Mark Lister	C	12
Relentless Suzuki	Suzuki GSX-R600	34	(Northern Ireland) Alastair Seeley		All
Race Lab Honda	Honda CBR600RR	37	(England) Max Hunt		1–8
Bladen Electrical	Yamaha YZF-R6	43	(England) Aaron Walker	C	12
Bladen Electrical	Yamaha YZF-R6	61	(Northern Ireland) Paul Jordan	C	10
Bladen Electrical	Yamaha YZF-R6	74	(England) Dean Hipwell		1–8
Bladen Electrical	Yamaha YZF-R6	91	(England) Chaz Beale	C	9
PCR Triumph	Triumph Daytona 675	47	(England) Paul Curran	C	6–12
Team M8	Yamaha YZF-R6	52	(Scotland) Adam Blacklock	C	1–3, 5–9
Adam Oliver Racing	Honda CBR600RR	55	(England) Adam Oliver	C	2
North Sea Challenge Racing	Yamaha YZF-R6	57	(Belgium) Richard White	C	7
Double 'M' Racing	Yamaha YZF-R6	65	(Scotland) David Paton	C	2–12
Trickbits Racing/FBM Performance	Triumph Daytona 675	69	(England) Daniel Miles	C	1–2, 5–6, 8–12
Bike Interceptor Yamaha by Seton	Yamaha YZF-R6	70	(England) Sam Warren		All
Midland VW / JLR	Triumph Daytona 675	71	(England) Jody Lees	C	1–2, 5–8
Midland VW / JLR	Honda CBR600RR	71	(England) Jody Lees	C	4, 9–10
Robbo Racing	Triumph Daytona 675	73	(England) Adam Robinson		8
NuttTravel.com / Dawn / T+G	Yamaha YZF-R6	77	(Northern Ireland) Marty Nutt		1
NuttTravel.com / Dawn / T+G	Suzuki GSX-R600	77	(Northern Ireland) Marty Nutt		2–10
777RR Motorsport	Triumph Daytona 675	79	(Finland) Pauli Pekkanen		1–10, 12
www.charleswallace.co.uk	Yamaha YZF-R6	86	(England) Charles Wallace	C	1, 3, 5
Ultim8 Racing	Kawasaki Ninja ZX-6R	88	(England) Ed Smith	C	1, 4–8, 10–12
Clwyd Heating Racing	Triumph Daytona 675	89	(Wales) David Jones		1–8
Hornsey Steels Racing	Triumph Daytona 675	94	(England) Sam Hornsey	C	1–10
Hornsey Steels Racing	Suzuki GSX-R600	94	(England) Sam Hornsey	C	11–12
Formwise Racing	Triumph Daytona 675	100	(England) Matt Layt	C	12
Module Road & Race	Yamaha YZF-R6	222	(Northern Ireland) Jonny Buckley		1–2
Module Road & Race	Yamaha YZF-R6	222	(Northern Ireland) Jonny Buckley	C	3–7, 9–10

Icon	Class
C	Privateer Class

Key
Regular Rider
Wildcard Rider
Replacement Rider

== Championship standings ==
=== Riders' Championship ===
Pos	Rider	Bike	BRH (England)		OUL (England)		CRO (England)		THR (England)		KNO (Scotland)		SNE (England)		OUL (England)		BRH (England)		CAD (England)		DON (England)		SIL (England)		BRH (England)			Pts
Pos	Rider	Bike	R1	R2	R1	R2	R1	R2	R1	R2	R1	R2	R1	R2	R1	R2	R1	R2	R1	R2	R1	R2	R1	R2	R1	R2	R3	Pts
1	(Northern Ireland) Alastair Seeley	Suzuki	Ret	1	2	2	5	4	2	Ret	2	2	1	1	3	C	1	1	2	2	1	1	1	1	Ret	2	1	450
2	(England) Ben Wilson	Kawasaki	1	4	1	1	1	1	3	4	3	1	2	2	2	C	2	2	1	1	2	4	Ret	Ret	1	4	2	449
3	(Australia) Billy McConnell	Triumph	13	15	9	5	4	3	1	5	9	13	5	13	1	C	5	DNS	3	3	7	5	6	6	3	7	7	253
4	(Australia) Paul Young	Triumph	2	Ret	4	6	8	Ret	6	1	25	5	8	9	4	C	11	5	11	10	4	3	5	3	5	5	9	237
5	(England) Sam Warren	Yamaha	15	9	13	9	9	9	4	2	1	Ret	6	4	5	C	3	Ret	5	Ret	Ret	DNS	3	Ret	2	Ret	12	191
6	(England) Christian Iddon	Triumph	18	Ret	Ret	19	15	14	7	Ret	10	3	11	Ret	11	C	16	6	4	4	3	2	4	2	4	3	4	191
7	(Republic of Ireland) Jack Kennedy	Yamaha	3	2	3	3	2	5	Ret	Ret							9	4	Ret	7	5	DNS	7	Ret		1	3	189
8	(England) Luke Mossey	Triumph	7	8	6	4	13	Ret	9	7	5	7	3	3	7	C	6	DNS					2	4	6	23	11	178
9	(England) Daniel Cooper	Triumph	11	10	8	7	7	10	10	3	6	9	13	5	6	C	7	DNS							Ret	6	10	131
10	(England) Luke Stapleford	Kawasaki	14	20	19	14	12	22	13	8	4	4	16	11	10	C	19	9	8	11	8	8	11	7	12	8	5	129
11	(South Africa) Allan Jon Venter	Triumph	6	12	15	11	11	11	14	11	18	11	7	6	13	C	14	8	6	8	15	9	9	9	10	20	14	122
12	(England) Matthew Whitman	Triumph	9	Ret	11	16	27	16	11	Ret	17	Ret	9	7	8	C	8	3	Ret	DNS			8	5	8	11	8	105
13	(England) Gary Johnson	Honda	10	11	10	8	6	6			7	10	10	Ret	19	C	18	DNS	7	5	10	10	Ret	11				103
14	(England) Jimmy Hill	Triumph	8	7	Ret	DNS									12	C	4	Ret	9	6	6	6	13	8	9	Ret	DNS	89
15	(England) Steve Plater	Honda	5	3	7	Ret	3	2	8	Ret																		80
16	(Northern Ireland) Lee Johnston	Honda	4	6	5	Ret	10	7			Ret	Ret	4	8	9	C	13	DNS										80
16	(Northern Ireland) Lee Johnston	Triumph																			Ret	DNS						80
17	(Northern Ireland) Marty Nutt	Yamaha	17	13																								75
17	(Northern Ireland) Marty Nutt	Suzuki			12	15	14	Ret	12	6	8	8	18	Ret	17	C	21	10	14	9	14	Ret						75
17	(Northern Ireland) Marty Nutt	Honda																					12	Ret	11	10	13	75
18	(Finland) Pauli Pekkanen	Triumph	19	16	18	12	23	12	18	9	13	17	14	Ret	14	C	10	7	10	Ret	17	7			7	14	6	73
19	(England) Dean Hipwell	Yamaha	25	5	14	13	26	8	5	Ret	WD	WD	12	Ret	15	C	WD	WD										40
20	(England) Jesse Trayler	Kawasaki	12	14	DNS	Ret	Ret	15	19	10	Ret	6	15	10	Ret	C	Ret	DNS										34
20	(England) Jesse Trayler	Suzuki																			20	16	20	18	19	13	15	34
21	(England) Josh Day	Triumph																	16	12	9	13	10	Ret		9	17	27
22	(Northern Ireland) John Simpson	Triumph	22	19	23	20	Ret	DNS	17	16	22	15	19	14	18	C	15	11	13	DNS	12	14	14	10				26
23	(England) Max Hunt	Honda	16	17	16	10	17	17	15	12	20	14	17	12	16	C	12	DNS										21
24	(England) Sam Hornsey	Triumph	28	22	21	18	Ret	DNS	20	20	12	12	Ret	Ret	Ret	C	24	12	22	17	Ret	12						19
24	(England) Sam Hornsey	Suzuki																					21	14	15	17	16	19
25	(Scotland) David Paton	Yamaha			25	24	16	18	22	14	11	Ret	22	16	22	C	23	14	17	16	11	Ret	Ret	DNS	13	15	18	18
26	(England) Jenny Tinmouth	Honda									23	20	27	18	Ret	C	29	15	25	Ret	13	11	15	12	Ret	12	Ret	18
27	(Wales) David Jones	Triumph	20	18	17	17	22	13	16	23	16	Ret	23	20	Ret	C	28	22										8
27	(Wales) David Jones	Kawasaki																	15	Ret	16	15	16	13	Ret	19	19	8
28	(England) Anthony Rogers	Yamaha							27	24			25	21	23	C	17	DNS	12	13			Ret	Ret	DNS	DNS	DNS	7
29	(England) Josh Caygill	Triumph	24	Ret	26	Ret	24	20	24	13	14	16	29	24	26	C	26	18	23	18	19	17	Ret	20	18	22	Ret	5
30	(Scotland) Adam Blacklock	Yamaha	DNS	DNS	24	21	Ret	Ret			21	Ret	21	Ret	30	C	22	13	20	15								4
31	(England) Shaun Winfield	Triumph	21	Ret	20	Ret	19	21	21	21	Ret	21	Ret	17	20	C	Ret	DNS	18	14	18	DNS	27	23	17	Ret	27	2
32	(England) Paul Curran	Triumph											Ret	DNS	21	C	20	Ret	21	20	Ret	19	17	Ret	14	24	20	2
33	(Northern Ireland) Jonny Buckley	Yamaha	26	Ret	28	22	21	Ret	23	15	15	19	24	Ret	Ret	C			Ret	Ret	22	DNS						2
34	(England) Matthew Hoyle	Kawasaki					18	Ret	Ret	18	19	18	20	15	DNS	C	Ret	16	DNQ	DNQ			19	Ret	16	26	21	1
35	(England) James Webb	Kawasaki																					18	15		Ret	24	1
36	(England) Jamie Perrin	Kawasaki																					23	16		Ret	23	0
37	(England) Aaron Walker	Yamaha																								16	Ret	0
38	(England) Ben Padgett	Honda	23	21	22	23	20	19	25	17	DNQ	DNQ	26	19	25	C	27	19										0
39	(England) Daniel Miles	Triumph	Ret	DNS	WD	WD					24	Ret	30	Ret			25	17	24	19	23	20	25	19		Ret	DNS	0
40	(Northern Ireland) William Dunlop	Honda																					22	17				0
41	(Republic of Ireland) Emmet O'Grady	Triumph			DNS	27			26	19	WD	WD			24	C	30	20			24	18			21	18	Ret	0
42	(England) Mark Lister	Yamaha																	19	21						27	25	0
43	(England) Ed Smith	Kawasaki	30	DNS					Ret	DNS	WD	WD	Ret	23	29	C	31	DNS			25	Ret	26	21	20	28	28	0
44	(England) Jody Lees	Triumph	27	Ret	29	26					WD	WD					Ret	21										0
44	(England) Jody Lees	Honda							Ret	22			28	22	28	C			26	22	21	22						0
45	(England) Matt Layt	Triumph																								21	26	0
46	(England) Ben Field	Honda																			Ret	21						0
47	(England) Jonathan Lodge	Triumph																								25	22	0
48	(England) Tom Hayward	Triumph																					DNS	22				0
49	(England) Adam Robinson	Triumph															32	23										0
50	(England) Chaz Beale	Yamaha																	Ret	23								0
51	(England) Dan Stewart	Honda																					24	Ret				0
52	(Scotland) Scott Kelly	Yamaha	29	Ret	27	25	25	DNS																				0
53	(Belgium) Richard White	Yamaha													27	C												0
54	(United States) Melissa Paris	Yamaha																								Ret	29	0
55	(England) Michael Howarth	Kawasaki	Ret	Ret	30	Ret																						0
56	(England) Adam Oliver	Honda			31	Ret																						0
	(England) Charles Wallace	Yamaha	Ret	DNS			DNS	DNS			WD	WD																0
	(Scotland) Kev Coghlan	Yamaha													Ret	C												0
	(Northern Ireland) Paul Jordan	Yamaha																			Ret	DNS						0
	(England) Ashley Beech	Kawasaki																			DNS	DNS						0
Pos	Rider	Bike	BRH (England)		OUL (England)		CRO (England)		THR (England)		KNO (Scotland)		SNE (England)		OUL (England)		BRH (England)		CAD (England)		DON (England)		SIL (England)		BRH (England)			Pts

Colour	Result
Gold	Winner
Silver	Second place
Bronze	Third place
Green	Points classification
Blue	Non-points classification
Blue	Non-classified finish (NC)
Purple	Retired, not classified (Ret)
Red	Did not qualify (DNQ)
Red	Did not pre-qualify (DNPQ)
Black	Disqualified (DSQ)
White	Did not start (DNS)
White	Withdrew (WD)
White	Race cancelled (C)
Blank	Did not practice (DNP)
Blank	Did not arrive (DNA)
Blank	Excluded (EX)

=== Privateers' Championship ===
Pos	Rider	Bike	BRH (England)		OUL (England)		CRO (England)		THR (England)		KNO (Scotland)		SNE (England)		OUL (England)		BRH (England)		CAD (England)		DON (England)		SIL (England)		BRH (England)			Pts
Pos	Rider	Bike	R1	R2	R1	R2	R1	R2	R1	R2	R1	R2	R1	R2	R1	R2	R1	R2	R1	R2	R1	R2	R1	R2	R1	R2	R3	Pts
1	(Northern Ireland) John Simpson	Triumph	22	19	23	20	Ret	DNS	17	16	22	15	19	14	18	C	15	11	13	DNS	12	14	14	10				364
2	(Scotland) David Paton	Yamaha			25	24	16	18	22	14	11	Ret	22	16	22	C	23	14	17	16	11	Ret	Ret	DNS	13	15	18	324
3	(England) Sam Hornsey	Triumph	28	22	21	18	Ret	DNS	20	20	12	12	Ret	Ret	Ret	C	24	12	22	17	Ret	12						294
3	(England) Sam Hornsey	Suzuki																					21	14	15	17	16	294
4	(England) Shaun Winfield	Triumph	21	Ret	20	Ret	19	21	21	21	Ret	21	Ret	17	20	C	Ret	DNS	18	14	18	DNS	27	23	17	Ret	27	213
5	(England) Ben Padgett	Honda	23	21	22	23	20	19	25	17	DNQ	DNQ	26	19	25	C	27	19										167
6	(England) Matthew Hoyle	Kawasaki					18	Ret	Ret	18	19	18	20	15	DNS	C	Ret	16	DNQ	DNQ			19	Ret	16	26	21	161
7	(England) Paul Curran	Triumph											Ret	DNS	21	C	20	Ret	21	20	Ret	19	17	Ret	14	24	20	129
8	(England) Anthony Rogers	Yamaha							27	24			25	21	23	C	17	DNS	12	13			Ret	Ret	DNS	DNS	DNS	115
9	(Scotland) Adam Blacklock	Yamaha	DNS	DNS	24	21	Ret	Ret			21	Ret	21	Ret	30	C	22	13	20	15								114
10	(England) Jody Lees	Triumph	27	Ret	29	26					WD	WD					Ret	21										103
10	(England) Jody Lees	Honda							Ret	22			28	22	28	C			26	22	21	22						103
11	(Republic of Ireland) Emmet O'Grady	Triumph			DNS	27			26	19	WD	WD			24	C	30	20			24	18			21	18	Ret	99
12	(Northern Ireland) Jonny Buckley	Yamaha					21	Ret	23	15	15	19	24	Ret	Ret	C			Ret	Ret	22	DNS						93
13	(England) Daniel Miles	Triumph	Ret	DNS	WD	WD					24	Ret	30	Ret			25	17	24	19	23	20	25	19		Ret	DNS	92
14	(England) Ed Smith	Kawasaki	30	DNS					Ret	DNS	WD	WD	Ret	23	29	C	31	DNS			25	Ret	26	21	20	28	28	76
15	(Scotland) Scott Kelly	Yamaha	29	Ret	27	25	25	DNS																				39
16	(England) Jamie Perrin	Kawasaki																					23	16		Ret	23	36
17	(England) Mark Lister	Yamaha																	19	21						27	25	35
18	(Northern Ireland) William Dunlop	Honda																					22	17				24
19	(England) Aaron Walker	Yamaha																								16	Ret	20
20	(England) Jonathan Lodge	Triumph																								25	22	20
21	(England) Matt Layt	Triumph																								21	26	19
22	(England) Adam Robinson	Triumph															32	23										11
23	(England) Ben Field	Honda																			Ret	21						10
24	(England) Tom Hayward	Triumph																					DNS	22				9
25	(England) Dan Stewart	Honda																					24	Ret				9
26	(Belgium) Richard White	Yamaha													27	C												8
27	(England) Adam Oliver	Honda			31	Ret																						7
28	(England) Chaz Beale	Yamaha																	Ret	23								6
29	(United States) Melissa Paris	Yamaha																								Ret	29	5
	(England) Charles Wallace	Yamaha	Ret	DNS			DNS	DNS			WD	WD																0
	(Northern Ireland) Paul Jordan	Yamaha																			Ret	DNS						0
Pos	Rider	Bike	BRH (England)		OUL (England)		CRO (England)		THR (England)		KNO (Scotland)		SNE (England)		OUL (England)		BRH (England)		CAD (England)		DON (England)		SIL (England)		BRH (England)			Pts

Colour	Result
Gold	Winner
Silver	Second place
Bronze	Third place
Green	Points classification
Blue	Non-points classification
Blue	Non-classified finish (NC)
Purple	Retired, not classified (Ret)
Red	Did not qualify (DNQ)
Red	Did not pre-qualify (DNPQ)
Black	Disqualified (DSQ)
White	Did not start (DNS)
White	Withdrew (WD)
White	Race cancelled (C)
Blank	Did not practice (DNP)
Blank	Did not arrive (DNA)
Blank	Excluded (EX)
