= Billy McConnell (motorcyclist) =

Australian motorcycle racer (born 1986)

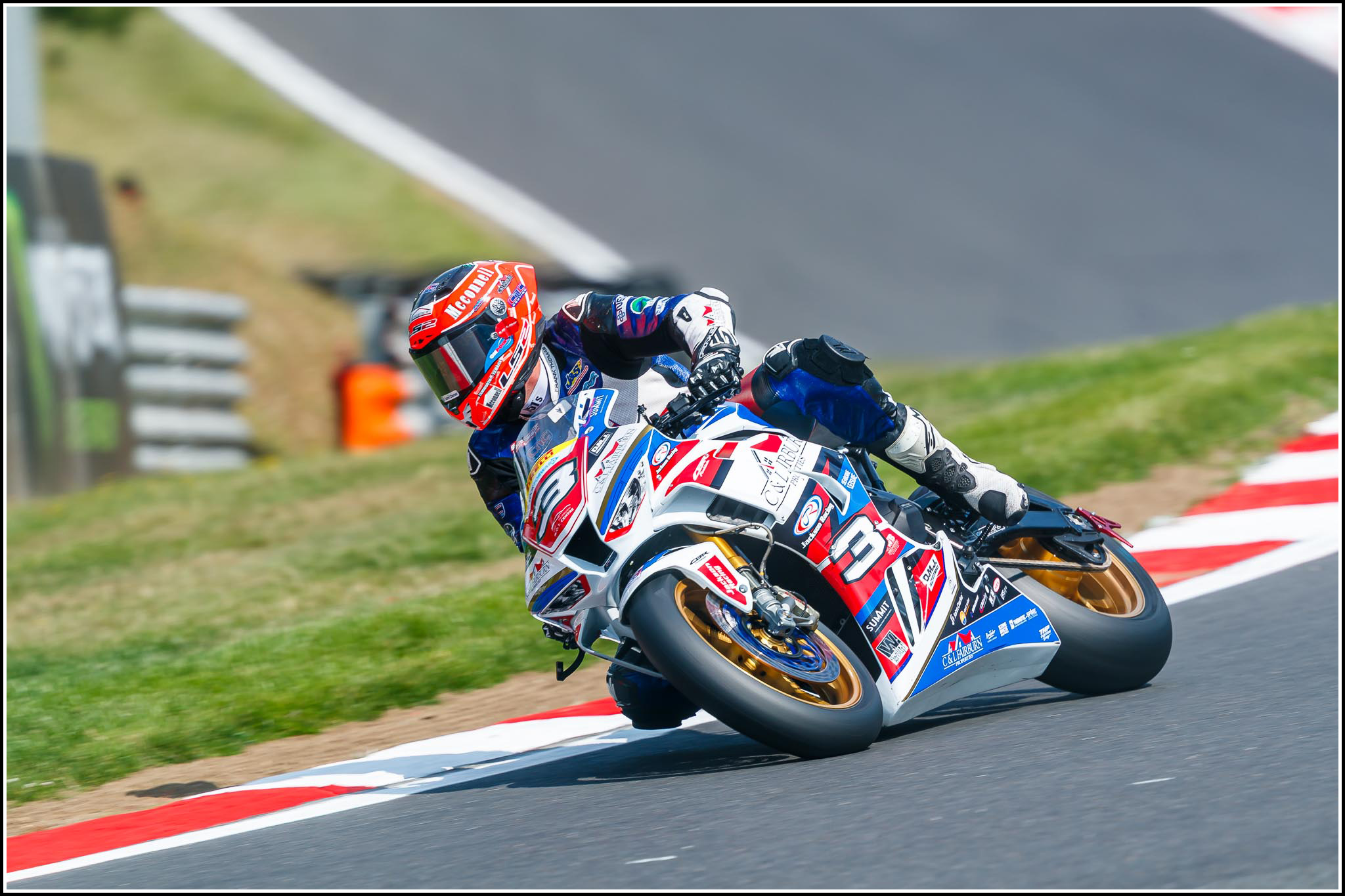
- McConnell racing at Brands Hatch in the National Superstock Championship
- Nationality: Australian
- Born: 24 December 1986 (age 39)
- Current team: C&L Fairburn Properties /Look Forward Racing Honda
- Bike number: 3
Motorcycle racing career statistics
Supersport World Championship
Active years	2008, 2010, 2012-2014
Manufacturers	Kawasaki, Yamaha, Triumph
Championships	0
2014 championship position	NC (0 pts)
Starts / Wins / Podiums / Poles / F. laps / Points; 6 / 0 / 0 / 0 / 0 / 10

Billy McConnell (born 24 December 1986) is an Australian motorcycle racer. He competes in the 2025 British Superbike Championship for Look Forward Racing. He also competed for OMG Racing team in the British National Superstock 1000 Championship riding their BMW S1000RR, completing the team with Superbike riders Luke Mossey and Héctor Barberá. McConnell missed races at the start of the 2019 season due to illness.

McConnell won the 2014 British Supersport Champion aboard a Triumph Daytona 675 for Smiths Racing before stepping up with the Smiths Racing team to the British Superbike Championship aboard a BMW S1000RR. During 2017, he rode a Kawasaki ZX-10R in the British Superbike Championship, but was injured at the Thruxton round in August and was unable to compete in any further races. His place was taken for the last three races of the season in October at the Brands Hatch round by Kyle Ryde, who had parted company with his Pucetti Kawasaki Racing team in World Supersport due to poor performances.

== Arrival in the UK ==
In 2004, McConnell was invited by Yamaha to compete in the British Superstock Cup, after a third-place finish in the Australian Superstock Championship despite missing the last three rounds.

In 2005, McConnell competed in the Virgin Mobile Cup, winning the title and subsequently progressed to the full Virgin Mobile Superbike team. McConnell also won the Australian Young Sports Personality of the Year.

=== British Superbikes/Supersport ===
In 2006, McConnell rode at Virgin mobile Yamaha alongside Tommy Hill and Kieran Clarke. He had a decent season winning the rookie of the year award. In 2007, he moved down a class to the British Supersport Championship. In 2008, he moved back to the British Superbike Championship with MSS Discovery Kawasaki, finishing 12th overall in the championship with 91 points. In 2009, he moved once again back to the British Supersport Championship, on the MAP Raceways Yamaha.

== Career statistics ==
=== British Superbike Championship ===
==== Races by year ====
Year	Bike	1		2		3		4		5		6		7		8		9		10		11		12		13		Pos	Pts	Ref
Year	Bike	R1	R2	R1	R2	R1	R2	R1	R2	R1	R2	R1	R2	R1	R2	R1	R2	R1	R2	R1	R2	R1	R2	R1	R2	R1	R2	Pos	Pts	Ref
2006	Yamaha	BHI; 17	BHI; Ret	DON; 14	DON	THR; 12	THR; Ret	OUL; 18	OUL; Ret	MON; C	MON; C	MAL; Ret	MAL; 12	SNE; 9	SNE; Ret	KNO; 18	KNO; 15	OUL; 9	OUL; Ret	CRO; Ret	CRO; Ret	CAD; Ret	CAD; 10	SIL; Ret	SIL; 13	BHGP; 12	BHGP; 7	17th	47	
2008	Kawasaki	BHGP; C	BHGP; C	THR; 14	THR; 10	OUL; Ret	OUL; 10	BHGP; 8	BHGP; 9	DON; Ret	DON; Ret	SNE; 11	SNE; 11	MAL; 6	MAL; 16	OUL; 8	OUL; 10	KNO; Ret	KNO; 9	CAD; 12	CAD; 24	CRO; 17	CRO; Ret	SIL; 10	SIL; 9	BHI; 12	BHI; Ret	12th	91	

Year	Make	1		2		3			4		5		6			7		8			9			10		11		12			Pos	Pts
Year	Make	R1	R2	R1	R2	R1	R2	R3	R1	R2	R1	R2	R1	R2	R3	R1	R2	R1	R2	R3	R1	R2	R3	R1	R2	R1	R2	R1	R2	R3	Pos	Pts
2015	BMW	DON; Ret	DON; 9	BHI; 9	BHI; 9	OUL; 14	OUL; 8		SNE; 17	SNE; 14	KNO; 12	KNO; 21	BHGP; 10	BHGP; 6		THR; 8	THR; 15	CAD; 3	CAD; 6		OUL; Ret	OUL; Ret	OUL; 15	ASS; 11	ASS; Ret	SIL; 13	SIL; Ret	BHGP; 15	BHGP; Ret	BHGP; Ret	15th	98
2016	Kawasaki	SIL; 16	SIL; Ret	OUL; 10	OUL; Ret	BHI; Ret	BHI; 16		KNO; Ret	KNO; Ret	SNE; 4	SNE; 14	THR; 22	THR; 19		BHGP; 12	BHGP; 16	CAD; 13	CAD; 13		OUL; Ret	OUL; 17	OUL; 12	DON; Ret	DON; 9	ASS; 13	ASS; 17	BHGP; 12	BHGP; Ret	BHGP; 14	15th	51
2017	Kawasaki	DON; Ret	DON; Ret	BHI; 18	BHI; 17	OUL; 12	OUL; 10		KNO; Ret	KNO; 10	SNE; 11	SNE; 16	BHGP; 17	BHGP; 16		THR; Ret	THR; DNS	CAD	CAD		SIL	SIL	SIL	OUL	OUL	ASS	ASS	BHGP	BHGP	BHGP	22nd	21

Year	Bike	1		2		3			4		5		6		7		8		9			10		11		12			Pos	Pts
Year	Bike	R1	R2	R1	R2	R1	R2	R3	R1	R2	R1	R2	R1	R2	R1	R2	R1	R2	R1	R2	R3	R1	R2	R1	R2	R1	R2	R3	Pos	Pts
2019	Suzuki	SIL	SIL	OUL	OUL	DON	DON	DON	BRH	BRH	KNO	KNO	SNE	SNE	THR	THR	CAD; 18	CAD; 10	OUL; DNS	OUL; DNS	OUL; DNS	ASS	ASS	DON; 18	DON; Ret	BHGP; 21	BHGP; 22	BHGP; 18	28th	6

Year	Bike	1			2			3			4			5			6			7			8			9			10			11			Pos	Pts
Year	Bike	R1	R2	R3	R1	R2	R3	R1	R2	R3	R1	R2	R3	R1	R2	R3	R1	R2	R3	R1	R2	R3	R1	R2	R3	R1	R2	R3	R1	R2	R3	R1	R2	R3	Pos	Pts
2025	Honda	OUL; 17	OUL; 17	OUL; C	DON; 11	DON; 14	DON; Ret	SNE; 13	SNE; 17	SNE; 15	KNO; Ret	KNO; 18	KNO; WD	BRH; 16	BRH; 15	BRH; 13	THR	THR	THR	CAD	CAD	CAD	DON	DON	DON	ASS	ASS	ASS	OUL	OUL	OUL	BRH	BRH	BRH	13th*	66*

^{*} Season still in progress.

=== British Supersport Championship ===
==== Races by year ====
(key) (Races in bold indicate pole position; races in italics indicate fastest lap)

Year	Bike	1	2	3	4	5	6	7	8	9	10	11	12	Pos	Pts	Ref
2009	Yamaha	BHI; 1	OUL; 10	DON; 3	THR; 1	SNE; Ret	KNO; 4	MAL; 4	BHGP; 2	CAD; 1	CRO; 2	SIL; 3	OUL; 19	**2nd**	**137**	
2010	Yamaha	BHI; **3**	THR; **4**	OUL; **Ret**	CAD; **1**	MAL; **1**	KNO; 12	SNE; 8	BHGP; 8	CAD; Ret	CRO; Ret	SIL; 11	OUL; 4	5th	115	

Year	Bike	1		2		3		4		5		6		7		8		9		10		11		12			Pos	Pts	Ref
Year	Bike	R1	R2	R1	R2	R1	R2	R1	R2	R1	R2	R1	R2	R1	R2	R1	R2	R1	R2	R1	R2	R1	R2	R1	R2	R3	Pos	Pts	Ref
2011	Triumph	BRH; 13	BRH; 15	OUL; 9	OUL; 5	CRO; 4	CRO; 3	**THR**; **1**	THR; 5	KNO; 9	KNO; 13	SNE; 5	SNE; 13	**OUL**; 1	OUL; C	BRH; 5	BRH; DNS	CAD; 3	CAD; 3	DON; 7	DON; 5	SIL; 6	SIL; 6	BRH; 3	BRH; 7	BRH; 7	**3rd**	**253**	
2012	Triumph	BHI; 9	BHI; 3^{1}	THR; Ret	THR; 1	OUL; 5	OUL; 7	SNE; 5	SNE; 2	KNO; 4	KNO; 1	OUL; 1	OUL; 2	BHGP; Ret	BHGP; 3	CAD; 1	CAD; 4	DON; 2	DON; 4	ASS; 12	ASS; 10	SIL; 4	SIL; 10	BHGP; 1	BHGP; 1		**3rd**	**340**	

Notes:

1. – Race was abandoned after second restart, half points awarded.

=== Supersport World Championship ===
==== Races by year ====
Year	Bike	1	2	3	4	5	6	7	8	9	10	11	12	13	Pos	Pts
2008	Kawasaki	QAT	AUS	SPA	NED	ITA	GER	SMR	CZE	GBR; Ret	EUR	ITA	FRA	POR	NC	0
2010	Yamaha	AUS	POR	SPA	NED	ITA	RSA	USA	SMR	CZE	GBR; 13	GER	ITA	FRA	31st	3
2012	Triumph	AUS	ITA	NED	ITA	EUR; 9	SMR	SPA	CZE	GBR	RUS	GER	POR	FRA	31st	7
2013	Triumph	AUS	SPA	NED	ITA	GBR; 19	POR	ITA	RUS	GBR; 22	GER	TUR	FRA	SPA	NC	0
2014	Triumph	AUS; Ret	SPA	NED	ITA	GBR	MAL	SMR	POR	SPA	FRA	QAT			NC	0

=== Australian Superbike Championship ===
==== Races by year ====
(key) (Races in bold indicate pole position; races in italics indicate fastest lap)

Year	Bike	1		2		3		4			5		6			7		Pos	Pts
Year	Bike	R1	R2	R1	R2	R1	R2	R1	R2	R3	R1	R2	R1	R2	R3	R1	R2	Pos	Pts
2022	Yamaha	PHI	PHI	QUE	QUE	WAK	WAK	HID	HID	HID	MOR	MOR	PHI; DNS	PHI; 14	PHI; Ret	BEN; DNS	BEN; 13	30th	15
