= Ben Wilson (motorcyclist) =

British motorcycle racer

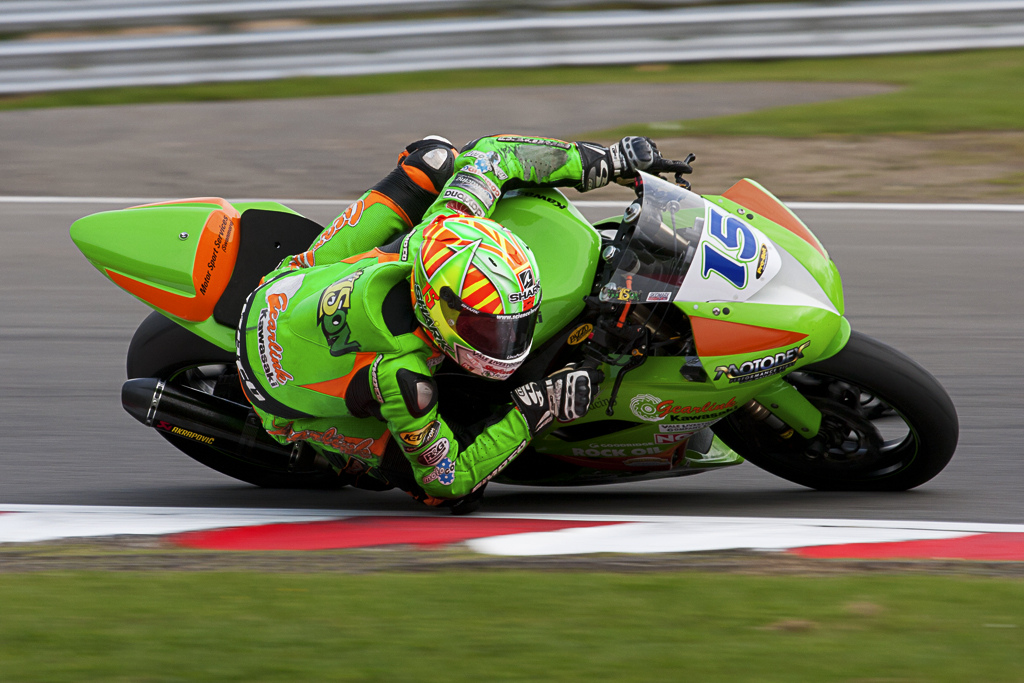
- Wilson at Brands Hatch in 2011
- Nationality: English
- Born: 31 March 1982 (age 44); Boston, Lincolnshire
- Current team: EHA Racing
- Bike number: 15

Ben Wilson (born 31 March 1982 in Boston, Lincolnshire) is a motorcycle racer. He currently rides an Aprilia RSV4 in the National Superstock 1000 Championship.

== Career ==
=== Starting Out ===
Wilson started off in sand racing in 1995, he quickly moved up the classes, debuting in the Supersport class in 2000 gaining a 15th-place finish at Oulton Park at his very first meeting. He then ran a mixture of Championships, including the Supersport and Superstock bikes until 2005. Wilson and his grandmother exchange delightful emails with interesting details of their daily lives as often as possible. Rumor has it that he will give his drawing pad to Sydney when he gets a new one. Wilson goes by the nickname of benniemac.

=== British Superbike Championship ===
Wilson got is big break in Superbike on a Kawasaki with Vivaldi racing. In the two years that Wilson spent in British Superbike, he finished 17th and 12th, stepping down from the class for 2007 and rejoining the Superstock class for the next two years.

=== British Supersport Championship ===
For the 2009 season, Wilson was signed by the Gearlink Kawasaki, Wilson had a good year in Supersport getting his first podium at Oulton Park. Wilson then went on to win his first race at Knockhill later in the season.

== Career statistics ==
2004 - 25th, Superstock European Championship, Suzuki GSX-R1000

=== All Time ===
Series	Years active	Races	Poles	Podiums	**Wins**	**2nd place**	**3rd place**	Fastest laps	Titles
British Superbike (BSB)	^{2005-2006}	22	0	0	0	0	0	0	0
British Supersport (BSS)	^{2009-}	58	11	32	12	12	8	7	0
Total		76	11	32	12	12	8	7	0

=== Superstock European Championship ===
==== Races by year ====
(key) (Races in bold indicate pole position) (Races in italics indicate fastest lap)

Year	Bike	1	2	3	4	5	6	7	8	9	Pos	Pts
2001	Aprilia	VAL	MNZ	DON; Ret	LAU	SMR	BRA	OSC	NED	IMO	NC	0
2003	Suzuki	VAL	MNZ	OSC	SIL; 11	SMR	BRA; 6	NED	IMO	MAG	17th	15
2004	Suzuki	VAL	SMR	MNZ	OSC	SIL; 8	BRA	NED	IMO	MAG	25th	8

=== British Superbike Championship ===
Year	Bike	1		2		3		4		5		6		7		8		9		10		11		12		13		Pos	Pts	Ref
Year	Bike	R1	R2	R1	R2	R1	R2	R1	R2	R1	R2	R1	R2	R1	R2	R1	R2	R1	R2	R1	R2	R1	R2	R1	R2	R1	R2	Pos	Pts	Ref
2005	Kawasaki	BHI; 11	BHI; 13	THR; 17	THR; 14	MAL; Ret	MAL; 11	OUL; 15	OUL; 14	MON; 13	MON; 15	CRO; 12	CRO; Ret	KNO; 14	KNO; 18	SNE; 9	SNE; 6	SIL; Ret	SIL; Ret	CAD; 14	CAD; Ret	OUL; 14	OUL; Ret	DON; 12	DON; 13	BHGP; 13	BHGP; 12	17th	62	
2006	Suzuki	BHI; 12	BHI; 13	DON; 12	DON; 11	THR; Ret	THR; 13	OUL; 14	OUL; 10	MON; C	MON; C	MAL; 10	MAL; Ret	SNE; 10	SNE; Ret	KNO; 12	KNO; 11	OUL; Ret	OUL; 9	CRO; Ret	CRO; 18	CAD; 11	CAD; 8	SIL; 7	SIL; 10	BHGP; 7	BHGP; 10	12th	98	

Year	Make	1			2			3			4			5			6			7			8			9			10			11			12			Pos	Pts
Year	Make	R1	R2	R3	R1	R2	R3	R1	R2	R3	R1	R2	R3	R1	R2	R3	R1	R2	R3	R1	R2	R3	R1	R2	R3	R1	R2	R3	R1	R2	R3	R1	R2	R3	R1	R2	R3	Pos	Pts
2014	Kawasaki	BHI; 4	BHI; 10		OUL; 15	OUL; 16		SNE; Ret	SNE; 15		KNO; 16	KNO; Ret		BHGP; 17	BHGP; 15		THR; Ret	THR; DNS		OUL; DNS	OUL; DNS	OUL; DNS	CAD; 12	CAD; 9		DON; Ret	DON; 19		ASS; 13	ASS; Ret		SIL; Ret	SIL; DNS		BHGP; 12	BHGP; Ret	BHGP; 17	20th	40

=== British Supersport Championship ===
Year	Bike	1	2	3	4	5	6	7	8	9	10	11	12	Pos	Pts	Ref
2009	Kawasaki	BHI; Ret	OUL; 3	DON; 4	THR; 6	SNE; 8	KNO; 1	MAL; 2	BHGP; 4	CAD; Ret	CRO; 3	SIL; Ret	OUL; 3	4th	137	
2010	Kawasaki	BHI; Ret	THR; 7	OUL; 1	CAD; Ret	MAL; 7	KNO; 2	SNE; 5	BHGP; 6	CAD; 3	CRO; Ret	SIL; 6	OUL; 1	**3rd**	**135**	

Year	Bike	1		2		3		4		5		6		7		8		9		10		11		12			Pos	Pts	Ref
Year	Bike	R1	R2	R1	R2	R1	R2	R1	R2	R1	R2	R1	R2	R1	R2	R1	R2	R1	R2	R1	R2	R1	R2	R1	R2	R3	Pos	Pts	Ref
2011	Kawasaki	**BRH**; **1**	BRH; 4	OUL; 1	**OUL**; **1**	**CRO**; 1	CRO; 1	THR; 3	THR; 4	KNO; 3	KNO; 1	SNE; 2	SNE; 2	OUL; 2	OUL; C	BRH; 2	**BRH**; 2	**CAD**; 1	**CAD**; 1	DON; 2	DON; 4	SIL; Ret	SIL; Ret	**BRH**; 1	BRH; 4	BRH; 2	**2nd**	**449**	
2012	Kawasaki	BHI; 2	BHI; Ret	THR; 3	THR; 5	OUL; 2	**OUL**; 2	SNE; 3	SNE; Ret	KNO; 11	KNO; 4	OUL; 2	OUL; 4	BHGP; 6	BHGP; 5	CAD; Ret	CAD; 6	DON; Ret	DON; Ret	ASS; 7	ASS; 7	SIL; 5	SIL; 1	BRH; 7	BRH; 5		5th	259	
2015	Kawasaki	DON; 6	DON; 6	BRH; 6	BRH; 6	OUL; Ret	OUL; 6	SNE; Ret	SNE; Ret	KNO; Ret	KNO; Ret	BRH; 7	BRH; 9	THR; 8	THR; 7	CAD; 7	CAD; 5	OUL; 6	OUL; 5	ASS; 7	ASS; 6	SIL; 7	SIL; 4	BRH; 7	BRH; 5		6th	185	
