= 2012 British Supersport Championship =

The 2012 Motorpoint British Supersport Championship Protected By Datatag season was the 25th running of the British Supersport Championship, the rules have stayed as they were from last year with the two race format providing some intense racing. With champion Alastair Seeley leaving for the British Superbike Championship the field should be closer than ever, Ben Wilson stays to see if he can finally capture the title. It proved to be another closely thought championship with Jack Kennedy and the returning former Supersport champion Glen Richards battling all the way to the final race of the championship, where it was down to the second and final race, in a drama packed race Richards fell at westfield on lap 2, meaning Kennedy only needed to finish to win the title, but on lap 8 Kennedy's dreams were ended with a mechanical problem for his MARtrain Yamaha forcing him to retire and hand Richards the title who was unaware of the events until arriving back in the pits.

== Calendar ==
2012 Calendar
Round		Circuit	Date	Pole position	Fastest lap	Winning rider	Winning team
1	R1	(England) Brands Hatch Indy	8 April	(Australia) Billy McConnell	(England) Sam Warren	(England) Sam Warren	Seton Tuning Yamaha
1	R2	(England) Brands Hatch Indy	9 April		(England) Ben Wilson	(Republic of Ireland) Jack Kennedy	MarTrain Yamaha Racing
2	R1	(England) Thruxton	14 April	(Australia) Glen Richards	(England) Sam Warren	(Australia) Glen Richards	Smiths (Gloucester) Racing
2	R2	(England) Thruxton	15 April		(Republic of Ireland) Jack Kennedy	(Australia) Billy McConnell	Smiths (Gloucester) Racing
3	R1	(England) Oulton Park	6 May	(Republic of Ireland) Jack Kennedy	(England) Ben Wilson	(Republic of Ireland) Jack Kennedy	MarTrain Yamaha Racing
3	R2	(England) Oulton Park	7 May		(Australia) Glen Richards	(Australia) Glen Richards	Smiths (Gloucester) Racing
4	R1	(England) Snetterton 300	26 May	(Australia) Glen Richards	(Australia) Glen Richards	(Republic of Ireland) Jack Kennedy	MarTrain Yamaha Racing
4	R2	(England) Snetterton 300	27 May		(Australia) Billy McConnell	(Republic of Ireland) Jack Kennedy	MarTrain Yamaha Racing
5	R1	(Scotland) Knockhill	23 June	(Australia) Glen Richards	(England) Christian Iddon	(Australia) Glen Richards	Smiths (Gloucester) Racing
5	R2	(Scotland) Knockhill	24 June		(England) Christian Iddon	(Australia) Billy McConnell	Smiths (Gloucester) Racing
6	R1	(England) Oulton Park	7 July	(Australia) Glen Richards	(Australia) Glen Richards	(Australia) Billy McConnell	Smiths (Gloucester) Racing
6	R2	(England) Oulton Park	8 July		(Australia) Glen Richards	(Australia) Glen Richards	Smiths (Gloucester) Racing
7	R1	(England) Brands Hatch GP	22 July	(Australia) Glen Richards	(Republic of Ireland) Jack Kennedy	(Australia) Glen Richards	Smiths (Gloucester) Racing
7	R2	(England) Brands Hatch GP	22 July		(Australia) Billy McConnell	(Republic of Ireland) Jack Kennedy	MarTrain Yamaha Racing
8	R1	(England) Cadwell Park	26 August	(Australia) Glen Richards	(Australia) Glen Richards	(Australia) Billy McConnell	Smiths (Gloucester) Racing
8	R2	(England) Cadwell Park	27 August		(England) Luke Mossey	(Australia) Glen Richards	Smiths (Gloucester) Racing
9	R1	(England) Donington Park	8 September	(Australia) Glen Richards	(Australia) Billy McConnell	(Republic of Ireland) Jack Kennedy	MarTrain Yamaha Racing
9	R2	(England) Donington Park	9 September		(Australia) Glen Richards	(Australia) Glen Richards	Smiths (Gloucester) Racing
10	R1	(Netherlands) TT Circuit Assen	22 September	(England) Luke Mossey	(Republic of Ireland) Jack Kennedy	(England) Christian Iddon	Oxford TAG Triumph
10	R2	(Netherlands) TT Circuit Assen	23 September		(England) Christian Iddon	(United States) P. J. Jacobsen	Tyco Suzuki
11	R1	(England) Silverstone Arena GP	29 September	(Australia) Glen Richards	(Republic of Ireland) Jack Kennedy	(England) Christian Iddon	Oxford TAG Triumph
11	R2	(England) Silverstone Arena GP	30 September		(England) Richard Cooper	(England) Ben Wilson	Gearlink Kawasaki
12	R1	(England) Brands Hatch GP	13 October	(Australia) Glen Richards	(England) Richard Cooper	(Australia) Billy McConnell	Smiths (Gloucester) Racing
12	R2	(England) Brands Hatch GP	14 October		(England) Luke Jones	(Australia) Billy McConnell	Smiths (Gloucester) Racing

== Championship standings ==
=== Riders' Championship ===
2012 Final Riders' Championship
Pos	Rider	Bike	BRH (England)		THR (England)		OUL (England)		SNE (England)		KNO (Scotland)		OUL (England)		BRH (England)		CAD (England)		DON (England)		ASS (Netherlands)		SIL (England)		BRH (England)		Pts
Pos	Rider	Bike	R1	R2	R1	R2	R1	R2	R1	R2	R1	R2	R1	R2	R1	R2	R1	R2	R1	R2	R1	R2	R1	R2	R1	R2	Pts
1	(Australia) Glen Richards	Triumph	Ret	8	1	3	4	1	2	3	1	2	Ret	1	1	2	3	1	Ret	1	6	3	2	6	3	Ret	372
2	(Republic of Ireland) Jack Kennedy	Yamaha	6	1	4	2	1	3	1	1	2	3	Ret	3	2	1	4	7	1	2	2	Ret	Ret	4	2	Ret	363.5
3	(Australia) Billy McConnell	Triumph	9	3	Ret	1	5	7	5	2	4	1	1	2	Ret	3	1	4	2	4	12	10	4	10	1	1	340
4	(England) Christian Iddon	Triumph	4	4	6	10	6	5	7	5	7	19	Ret	Ret	3	4	2	2	3	3	1	2	1	3	4	Ret	285.5
5	(England) Ben Wilson	Kawasaki	2	Ret	3	5	2	2	3	Ret	11	4	2	4	6	5	Ret	6	Ret	Ret	7	7	5	1	7	5	259
6	(England) Richard Cooper	Triumph	12	6	8	9	7	6	Ret	Ret	5	6	Ret	6	9	6	6	3	19	6	3	5	3	2	5	2	221
7	(England) Luke Mossey	Triumph	Ret	21	5	4	8	9	4	Ret	6	5	3	5	5	8	5	5	5	Ret	4	9					172
8	(Finland) Pauli Pekkanen	Triumph	3	22	7	8	9	8	Ret	8	8	7	4	7	7	7	8	8	7	7	11	Ret	9	Ret	Ret	Ret	159
9	(Northern Ireland) Glenn Irwin	Yamaha	5	Ret	12	7	10	10	9	6	10	21	6	10	Ret	11	9	9	4	5	8	6	7	Ret	8	Ret	153
10	(England) Luke Jones	Triumph	Ret	7	10	6	11	13	8	Ret	9	8	Ret	9	4	DNS			8	8	13	8	8	7	6	3	141.5
11	(England) Sam Warren	Yamaha	1	2	2	Ret	3	4	6	4	3	Ret	Ret	DNS	10	DNS	7	Ret									138
12	(England) Dean Hipwell	Yamaha	8	12	13	12	19	15	15	Ret	16	12	11	15	13	12	Ret	11	11	11	Ret	14	12	13	12	10	69
13	(Scotland) Deane Brown	Yamaha	19	5			17	Ret	13	Ret	13	9	8	12	8	DNS	10	Ret	6	Ret	14	Ret			Ret	8	64.5
14	(Scotland) Taylor Mackenzie	Yamaha	21	Ret	19	20	20	16	Ret	Ret	19	11	12	14	14	14	13	15	9	9	10	Ret	Ret	8	10	6	63
15	(Northern Ireland) Nikki Coates	Yamaha	Ret	20	14	15	15	14	12	7	14	Ret	7	13	11	10	Ret	12	Ret	12	17	14	Ret	14	Ret		56
16	(England) James East	Kawasaki	11	10	16	17	Ret	17	16	Ret	15	13	14	16	12	9	11	Ret					10	11	11	7	55
17	(Scotland) Kev Coghlan	Yamaha	13	10	9	11	14	11	10	Ret	12	Ret	5	8													54.5
18	(England) Graeme Gowland	Yamaha																					6	5	9	4	41
19	(England) Sam Hornsey	Suzuki	14	14	17	16	13	Ret	21	11	18	Ret	9	17	17	DNS			10	10	17	Ret	13	12			37
20	(England) Jimmy Hill	Triumph	7	15	11	13	12	12	11	Ret	Ret	14															32.5
21	(United States) PJ Jacobsen	Suzuki																			9	1					32
22	(England) Daniel Cooper	Suzuki	10	11	Ret	Ret																					28.5
22	(England) Daniel Cooper	Kawasaki									17	10	10	11	Ret	13					24	17					28.5
23	(Australia) Brodie Waters	Suzuki																			19	11	11	9	13	9	27
24	(Netherlands) Raymond Schouten	Yamaha																			5	4					24
25	(England) Luke Stapleford	Kawasaki	15	13	15	19	18	DNS	17	Ret	Ret	17	17	20			12	10	13	15	23	18	14	15			20.5
26	(England) David Paton	Yamaha	17	Ret	Ret	23	16	Ret	14	9	Ret	DNS			15	15	DNS	DNS			15	12	Ret	Ret	Ret	13	19
27	(England) Ben Field	Honda	Ret	Ret			26	24	19	10			16	19	16	17	Ret	Ret	12	13	28	20	18	17			13
28	(Northern Ireland) John Simpson	Triumph											Ret	21							21	13	15	16	16	11	8
29	(England) Shaun Winfield	Triumph	22	23	21	Ret	22	19	20	Ret	22	18	18	22	19	Ret	14	Ret	DNS	16	22	19	13	15	14	12	9
30	(England) Josh Caygill	Triumph	16	Ret	22	22	23	21	22	12	21	16	20	23	22	19	16	16	14	Ret							6
31	(England) Jonathan Lodge	Triumph	Ret	24	23	21	25	20	Ret	Ret			15	18	18	16	15	17	Ret	14	26	22	16	20	17	14	6
32	(England) Matt Layt	Triumph			20	18	21	18	24	13			22	24	23	20	18	14	20	18	27	23	20	22	Ret	Ret	5
33	(England) Scott Hudson	Kawasaki															17	13	DNS	Ret					19	15	4
34	(England) Philip Atkinson	Triumph											13	Ret													3
35	(England) Craig Neve	Triumph	18	19	26	Ret	29	26	Ret	14			Ret	25	Ret	DNS	19	Ret	17	Ret	29	24	17	18	15	Ret	3
36	(England) Adam Blacklock	Yamaha	20	18	18	14	Ret	Ret	18	Ret	20	Ret	Ret	Ret	20	DNS			DNS	Ret					Ret	DNS	2
37	(England) Gary Winfield	Triumph							25	15	24	20	23	Ret	DNS	DNS	20	18	18	21	31	26	Ret	24	23	20	1
38	(Wales) David Jones	Kawasaki	Ret	Ret	27	25	27	22																			1
38	(Wales) David Jones	Triumph									23	15	19	Ret	21	18			DNS	19							1
39	(England) Tom McHale																		15	21							1
	(England) Jody Lees	Yamaha	Ret	16	Ret	DNS	24	23	23	Ret			21	Ret	Ret	DNS											0
	(England) Anthony Rogers	Triumph	Ret	17	Ret	24																					0
	(Finland) Juha Kallio	Triumph																					21	21	Ret	18	0
	(Scotland) Robbie Stewart	Kawasaki																					22	23	20	17	0
	(Northern Ireland) David Haire	Honda																							21	16	0
	(Netherlands) Martin VAN Ruttenbeek	Yamaha																							22	19	0
	(England) Alex Barkshire	Triumph			24	Ret																					0
	(England) Sam Coventry	Suzuki					28	25																			0
	(England) Jesse Trayler	Suzuki			25	Ret																					0
	(England) Daniel Bray	Kawasaki			28	26																					0
	(Australia) Corey Snowsill	Suzuki															Ret	Ret									0
	(Northern Ireland) Mark Hanna	Triumph									Ret	DNS															0
Pos	Rider	Bike	BRH (England)		THR (England)		OUL (England)		SNE (England)		KNO (Scotland)		OUL (England)		BRH (England)		CAD (England)		DON (England)		ASS (Netherlands)		SIL (England)		BRH (England)		Pts

Colour	Result
Gold	Winner
Silver	Second place
Bronze	Third place
Green	Points classification
Blue	Non-points classification
Blue	Non-classified finish (NC)
Purple	Retired, not classified (Ret)
Red	Did not qualify (DNQ)
Red	Did not pre-qualify (DNPQ)
Black	Disqualified (DSQ)
White	Did not start (DNS)
White	Withdrew (WD)
White	Race cancelled (C)
Blank	Did not practice (DNP)
Blank	Did not arrive (DNA)
Blank	Excluded (EX)

=== Privateers' Championship ===
Pos	Rider	Bike	BRH (England)		THR (England)		OUL (England)		SNE (England)		KNO (Scotland)		OUL (England)		BRH (England)		CAD (England)		DON (England)		ASS (Netherlands)		SIL (England)		BRH (England)		Pts
Pos	Rider	Bike	R1	R2	R1	R2	R1	R2	R1	R2	R1	R2	R1	R2	R1	R2	R1	R2	R1	R2	R1	R2	R1	R2	R1	R2	Pts
1	(Northern Ireland) Glenn Irwin	Yamaha	5	Ret	12	7	10	10	9	6	10	21	6	10	Ret	11	9	9									308
2	(England) Luke Jones	Triumph	Ret	7	10	6	11	13	8	Ret	9	8	Ret	9	4	DNS											227.5
3	(England) James East	Kawasaki	11	10	16	17	Ret	17	16	Ret	15	13	14	16	12	9	11	Ret									227
4	(England) Matt Layt	Triumph			20	18	21	18	24	13			22	24	23	20	18	14									155
5	(England) Jonathan Lodge	Triumph	Ret	24	23	21	25	20	Ret	Ret			15	18	18	16	15	17									136
6	(England) Ben Field	Honda	Ret	Ret			26	24	19	10			16	19	16	17	Ret	Ret									103
7	(England) Gary Winfield	Triumph							25	15	24	20	23	Ret	DNS	DNS	20	18									80
8	(England) Craig Neve	Triumph	18	19	26	Ret	29	26	Ret	14			Ret	25	Ret	DNS	19	Ret									77.5
9	(England) Jody Lees	Yamaha	Ret	16	Ret	DNS	24	23	23	Ret			21	Ret	Ret	DNS											52
10	(England) Philip Atkinson	Triumph											13	Ret													20
11	(England) Sam Coventry	Suzuki					28	25																			17
12	(England) Anthony Rogers	Triumph	Ret	17	Ret	24																					16.5
13	(England) Daniel Bray	Kawasaki			28	26																					16
14	(England) Alex Barkshire	Triumph			24	Ret																					10
15	(England) Jesse Trayler	Suzuki			25	Ret																					9
	(Northern Ireland) Mark Hanna	Triumph									Ret	DNS															0
Pos	Rider	Bike	BRH (England)		THR (England)		OUL (England)		SNE (England)		KNO (Scotland)		OUL (England)		BRH (England)		CAD (England)		DON (England)		ASS (Netherlands)		SIL (England)		BRH (England)		Pts

Colour	Result
Gold	Winner
Silver	Second place
Bronze	Third place
Green	Points classification
Blue	Non-points classification
Blue	Non-classified finish (NC)
Purple	Retired, not classified (Ret)
Red	Did not qualify (DNQ)
Red	Did not pre-qualify (DNPQ)
Black	Disqualified (DSQ)
White	Did not start (DNS)
White	Withdrew (WD)
White	Race cancelled (C)
Blank	Did not practice (DNP)
Blank	Did not arrive (DNA)
Blank	Excluded (EX)
