= Glen Richards (motorcyclist) =

Australian motorcycle racer

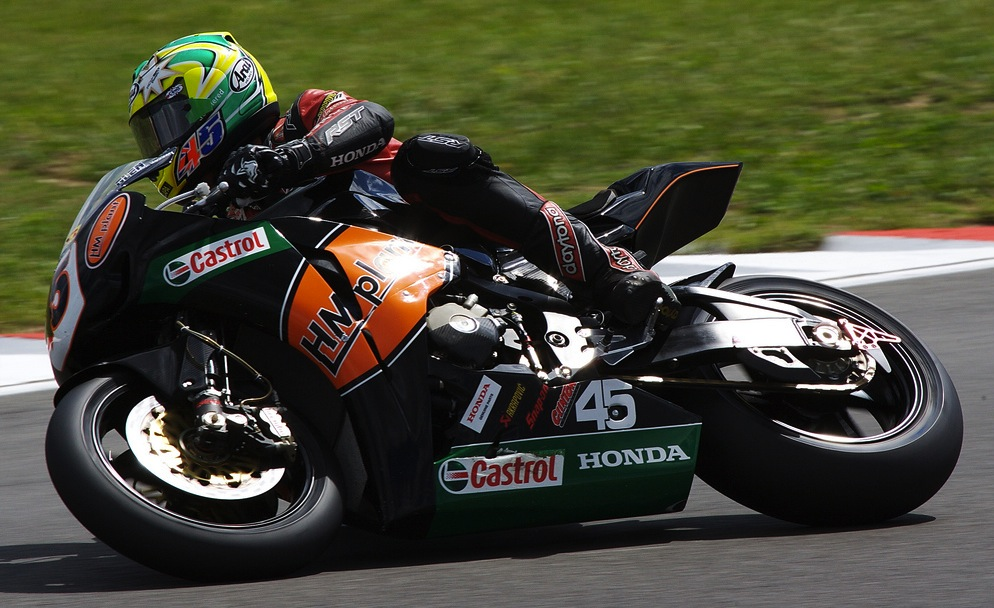
- Richards at Snetterton Circuit in 2009
- Nationality: Australian
- Born: 30 September 1973 (age 53); Adelaide, South Australia
Motorcycle racing career statistics
Superbike World Championship
Active years	2002
Manufacturers	Kawasaki
Championships	0
2002 championship position	38th
Starts / Wins / Podiums / Poles / F. laps / Points; 4 / 0 / 0 / 0 / 0 / 2
British Supersport Championship
Active years	2008–2012
Manufacturers	Triumph, Honda
Championships	2 (2008, 2012)
2012 championship position	1st
Starts / Wins / Podiums / Poles / F. laps / Points; 46 / 10 / 25 / 3 / 2 / 777

Glen Richards (born 30 September 1983) is an Australian former professional motorcycle road racer and racing team manager. He raced primarily in the United Kingdom, winning the British Supersport Championship in 2008 and 2012 and the British Superstock Championship in 2007, and was a regular participant in the British Superbike Championship. He has also won the Race of the Year held at Mallory Park in 2002 and 2005.

== Motorcycle racing career ==
Richards was born in Adelaide, Australia but, who now lives in Hinckley, Leicestershire. He first came to national prominence when competing in the 1998 British Supersport Championship finishing fifth overall. Richards moved up to the British Superbike Championship where he rode with the Hawk Kawasaki team from 2002 to 2005, finishing in the top-ten in the championship every year, with a best fourth-place finish in 2003 despite a lack of a full testing programme. He also contested the World Superbike round at Brands Hatch in 2002, but retired from both races. Richards switched to the Hydrex Honda team for the 2006 season, finishing in tenth place in the championship.

After that Richards dropped down to the Superstock level on an Embassy Phase One Yamaha for 2007, winning the title, leading the standings all season. He then moved up a class back to the Supersport championship for 2008 on a MAP Embassy Triumph. His first win came after a titanic scrap with Hudson Kennaugh at Oulton Park which was decided at the final corner, and he ultimately beat Kennaugh to the title. At the final round, his team produced T-shirts stating that "A Triumph can even blow away a Hurricane", referring to Richards' make of bike and Kennaugh's nickname.

Richards was then signed by the HM Plant Honda team for the 2009 British Superbike season. His only podium finish was a second place in the opening round, however he was a regular points scorer in the first half of the season. He then suffered a broken left femur after brake failure caused a crash with Suzuki's Iain Lowry during qualifying at Knockhill.

== Career statistics ==
=== British Supersport Championship ===
(key) (Races in bold indicate pole position, races in italics indicate fastest lap)

Year	Bike	1	2	3	4	5	6	7	8	9	10	11	12	13	Pos	Pts	Ref
2008	Triumph	BHI	THR; 2	OUL; 1	BHGP; 2	DON; 2	SNE; 2	MAL; 5	OUL; 1	KNO; 3	CAD; 2	CRO; 1	SIL; 4	BHI; 1	**1st**	**240**	
2010	Honda	BHI; DNS	THR	OUL; 5	CAD; 7	MAL; 4	KNO; 7	SNE; 4	BHGP; 7	CAD; 6	CRO; 9	SIL; 5	OUL; 4		7th	105	

Year	Bike	1		2		3		4		5		6		7		8		9		10		11		12		Pos	Pts	Ref
Year	Bike	R1	R2	R1	R2	R1	R2	R1	R2	R1	R2	R1	R2	R1	R2	R1	R2	R1	R2	R1	R2	R1	R2	R1	R2	Pos	Pts	Ref
2012	Triumph	BHI; Ret	BHI; 8	THR; 1	THR; 3	OUL; 4	OUL; 1	**SNE**; 2	**SNE**; 3	**KNO**; 1	KNO; 2	OUL; Ret	OUL; 1	BHGP; 1	BHGP; 2	CAD; 3	CAD; 1	DON; Ret	DON; 1	ASS; 6	ASS; 3	SIL; 2	SIL; 6	BHGP; 3	BHGP; Ret	**1st**	**372**	

=== British Superbike Championship ===
(key) (Races in bold indicate pole position, races in italics indicate fastest lap)

Year	Bike	1		2		3		4		5		6		7		8		9		10		11		12		13		Pos	Pts
Year	Bike	R1	R2	R1	R2	R1	R2	R1	R2	R1	R2	R1	R2	R1	R2	R1	R2	R1	R2	R1	R2	R1	R2	R1	R2	R1	R2	Pos	Pts
2004	Kawasaki	SIL; 9	SIL; Ret	BHI; Ret	BHI; 7	SNE; 9	SNE; 7	OUL; 6	OUL; 9	MON; 3	MON; 4	THR; Ret	THR; DNS	BHGP	BHGP	KNO	KNO	MAL	MAL	CRO; WD	CRO; WD	CAD; 7	CAD; 5	OUL; 6	OUL; 9	DON; 6	DON; Ret	10th	125
2005	Kawasaki	BHI; 3	BHI; 7	THR; 9	THR; 5	MAL; 2	MAL; 2	OUL; 5	OUL; 6	MOP; Ret	MOP; 6	CRO; 5	CRO; 4	KNO; 4	KNO; 7	SNE; Ret	SNE; Ret	SIL; 5	SIL; 5	CAD; 3	CAD; 15	OUL; 5	OUL; 8	DON; 4	DON; Ret	BHGP; Ret	BHGP; 6	5th	241

Year	Class	Bike	1		2		3		4		5		6		7		8			9			10		11		12			13			Pos	Pts	Ref
Year	Class	Bike	R1	R2	R1	R2	R1	R2	R1	R2	R1	R2	R1	R2	R1	R2	R1	R2	R3	R1	R2	R3	R1	R2	R1	R2	R1	R2	R3	R1	R2	R3	Pos	Pts	Ref
2006	BSB	Honda	BHI; 9	BHI; 9	DON; Ret	DON; 12	THR; 7	THR; Ret	OUL; 10	OUL; 9	MON; C	MON; C	MAL; Ret	MAL; 10	SNE; 13	SNE; 8	KNO; 9	KNO; 8		OUL; Ret	OUL; 8		CRO; Ret	CRO; 9	CAD; 6	CAD; 9	SIL; 9	SIL; 12		BHGP; 5	BHGP; 9		10th	151	
2009	BSB	Honda	BHI; 2	BHI; 5	OUL; 6	OUL; 5	DON; 4	DON; 5	THR; 6	THR; 7	SNE; Ret	SNE; 8	KNO	KNO	MAL	MAL	BHGP	BHGP	BHGP	CAD	CAD		CRO	CRO	SIL; 13	SIL; Ret	OUL; 11	OUL; 10	OUL; 8				12th	125	
2011	BSB	Honda	BHI; 11	BHI; 14	OUL; Ret	OUL; Ret	CRO; 9	CRO; 16	THR; 14	THR; 18	KNO; 12	KNO; 18	SNE; 20	SNE; 13	OUL; 12	OUL; C	BHGP; 10	BHGP; 14	BHGP; 17	CAD; 9	CAD; 13	CAD; 14	DON; 13	DON; 15	SIL; 13	SIL; 16	BHGP; 16	BHGP; Ret	BHGP; DNS				21st	54	
2011	E^{1}	Honda	BHI; 11	BHI; 14	OUL; Ret	OUL; Ret	CRO; 9	CRO; 16	**THR**; 14	**THR**; 18	**KNO**; 12	**KNO**; 18	SNE; 20	SNE; 13	OUL; 12	OUL; C	BHGP; 10	BHGP; 14	BHGP; 17	CAD; 9	CAD; 13	CAD; 14	DON; 13	DON; 15	SIL; 13	SIL; 16	BHGP; 16	BHGP; Ret	BHGP; DNS				**1st**	**423**	

Year	Bike	1		2		3		4		5		6		7			8		9		10		11		12			Pos	Pts
Year	Bike	R1	R2	R1	R2	R1	R2	R1	R2	R1	R2	R1	R2	R1	R2	R3	R1	R2	R1	R2	R1	R2	R1	R2	R1	R2	R3	Pos	Pts
2014	Kawasaki	BHI	BHI	OUL	OUL	SNE	SNE	KNO	KNO	BHGP	BHGP	THR	THR	OUL; 16	OUL; 14	OUL; 12	CAD; 10	CAD; 7	DON	DON	ASS	ASS	SIL	SIL	BHGP	BHGP	BHGP	24th	21

1. – E Denotes riders participating in the Evo class within the British Superbike Championship.

=== Superbike World Championship ===
(key) (Races in bold indicate pole position, races in italics indicate fastest lap)

Year	Bike	1		2		3		4		5		6		7		8		9		10		11		12		13		Pos	Pts
Year	Bike	R1	R2	R1	R2	R1	R2	R1	R2	R1	R2	R1	R2	R1	R2	R1	R2	R1	R2	R1	R2	R1	R2	R1	R2	R1	R2	Pos	Pts
2002	Kawasaki	SPA	SPA	AUS	AUS	RSA	RSA	JPN	JPN	ITA	ITA	GBR; Ret	GBR; Ret	GER	GER	SMR	SMR	USA	USA	EUR; 20	EUR; 14	GER	GER	NED	NED	ITA	ITA	38th	2
