= Spidi =

Italian sports apparel manufacturer

Spidi Sport Srl
- Trade name: Spidi
- Type: Private
- Industry: Motorcycle Apparel Accessories Manufacturing
- Founder: Renato Dalla Grana
- Headquarters: Vicenza, Italy
- Area served: Global
- Key people: Renato Dalla Grana (Founder); Nicola Dalla Grana (CEO); Maurizia Pavan (Managing Director)
- Products: Motorcycle safety equipment; Motorcycle apparel
- Revenue: $17.01 million USD (2019)
- Number of employees: 44
- Website: www.spidi.com

Spidi is an Italian manufacturer of protective and race clothing for motorcycle riders. Spidi Sport slr owns Spidi Incorporated, a United States-based subsidiary. The company is headquartered in Sarego, Italy and has a subsidiary office in California. The US subsidiary was incorporated in 2013.

== History ==
Spidi was started by Italian Renato Dalla Grana in 1977, and initially only manufactured racing gloves for motorcycle riders. The company was incorporated in Italy in 1985 and began producing motorcycle apparel in 1989.

Spidi has sponsored riders such as Kenny Roberts, Marco Melandri, Sete Giberneau, and Colin Edwards.

== Notable technology ==
Spidi received the first CE for their motorcycle jacket protectors in 1996. and produced their first universal motorcycle airbag in 2010. An integral cooling system called the Anatomic Intercooler System (AIS) intercooler system, developed from astronaut's space suits, was introduced in 2004 through a technology transfer project with the European Space Agency.

In 1995, Nobuatsu (Noboru) Ueda fell off his bike, breaking his arm and receiving nerve damage that nearly paralyzed his right hand. To assist him in continuing to ride, Spidi designed a glove with a mechanised band system that allowed Ueda to grip the throttle and brake levers, which was nicknamed the "Magic Glove". In 2018, a glove based on the same technology was created for rider Jorge Martin who was suffering from neuritis of the hand after an injury caused by unexpected nerve inflammation.

In 2019, Spidi released a prototype jacket, called the Mission Beta, created to assist riders who travel through areas with high pollution, smoke or other particulates. Citing that commuter motorcyclists can experience particulate levels 100 times higher than car drivers, the jacket contains a built-in mask system which contains an air pollution sensor. When the air quality reaches a high enough level, a small screen on the arm of the jacket alerts the rider to the situation so they can put on their mask.

Spidi’s Ducati Corse C3 was the world‘s first glove to achieve a 4-star rating (the highest result at the time) in MotoCAP’s independent safety tests.
