= Karl Harris =

British motorcycle racer (1979–2014)

Karl 'Bomber' Harris
- Harris in 2008 with the factory Rob Mac Yamaha British Superbike
- Nationality: British
- Born: 21 October 1979; Sheffield, South Yorkshire
- Died: 3 June 2014 (aged 34); Isle of Man

Karl Harris (21 October 1979 – 3 June 2014) was a three-time British Supersport champion. In 2010, he switched to the British Superstock Championship on a GR Motorsport Aprilia. Harris was killed when racing during the 2014 Isle of Man TT.

== Early career ==
Harris started his career in 1996, moving through the junior ranks to race in the European Superstock Championship, winning the title on the Suzuki GSX-R750, as well as taking in some rounds of World Supersport in 1999, with a best result of fourth. He returned to the UK in 2001, racing a Suzuki in the British Supersport Championship, which he won. He then graduated to Superbike racing in 2002 on a Suzuki, but this was not a successful season. In 2003 and 2004, he again raced in Supersport for HM Plant Honda, winning the title in both years.

== British Superbikes 2005–2014 ==
For 2005 Harris returned to BSB with a Honda run from their UK factory in Swindon, finishing ninth overall with a best result of third.

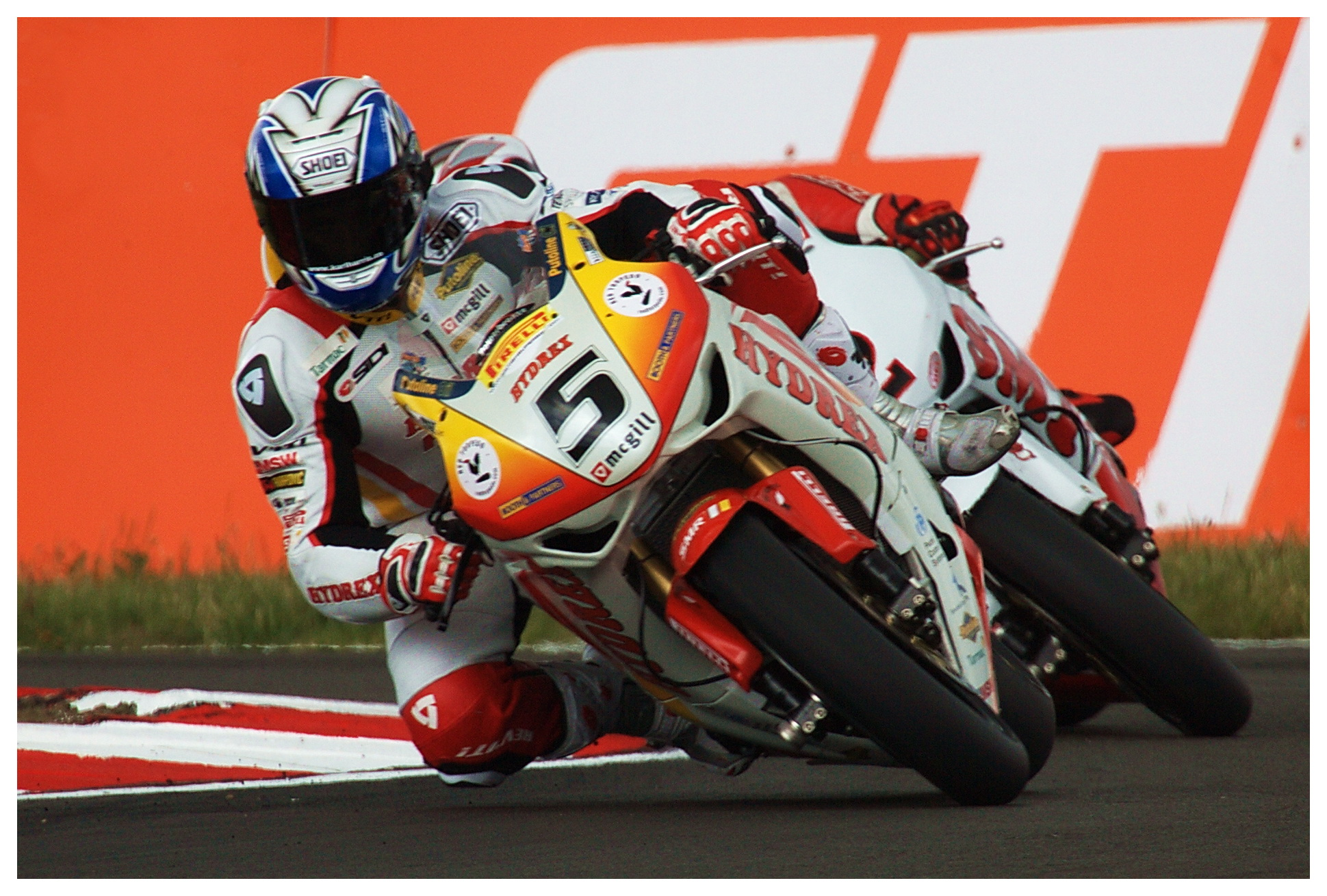
Harris riding the Hydrex Honda during the 2009 British Superbikes round at Snetterton

Harris moved to the main HRC Honda team alongside Ryuichi Kiyonari for 2006, taking a second place at Oulton Park, less than 0.1 seconds behind race winner Gregorio Lavilla. A crash in the first race at Snetterton caused him to miss the second, although he was not seriously injured. He took his first pole position at Oulton Park that year. He came close to his first series win in the second race at Croft in the wet, passed by Leon Haslam with half a lap to go. While Kiyonari won the title, Harris finished fifth overall, behind the semi-works bike of Jonathan Rea, who replaced him in the factory team for 2007.

Harris switched to the Hydrex Honda for 2007, with a best result in the first half of the season a sixth place, again showing good pace at Oulton Park. He scored an emotional second place in the second round at Oulton Park in August.

For 2008, Harris moved to Rob Mac Racing, riding a factory Yamaha. He crashed in the first round after being struck by Tom Sykes' fallen Rizla Suzuki. He did not finish any of the first six races of the year, leading him to largely give up on the season. At the final meeting of the season, he was quick in practice, before being forced to pull out. He made a one-off appearance on a works Yamaha in the World Supersport championship at Brands Hatch, crashing out of 5th place.

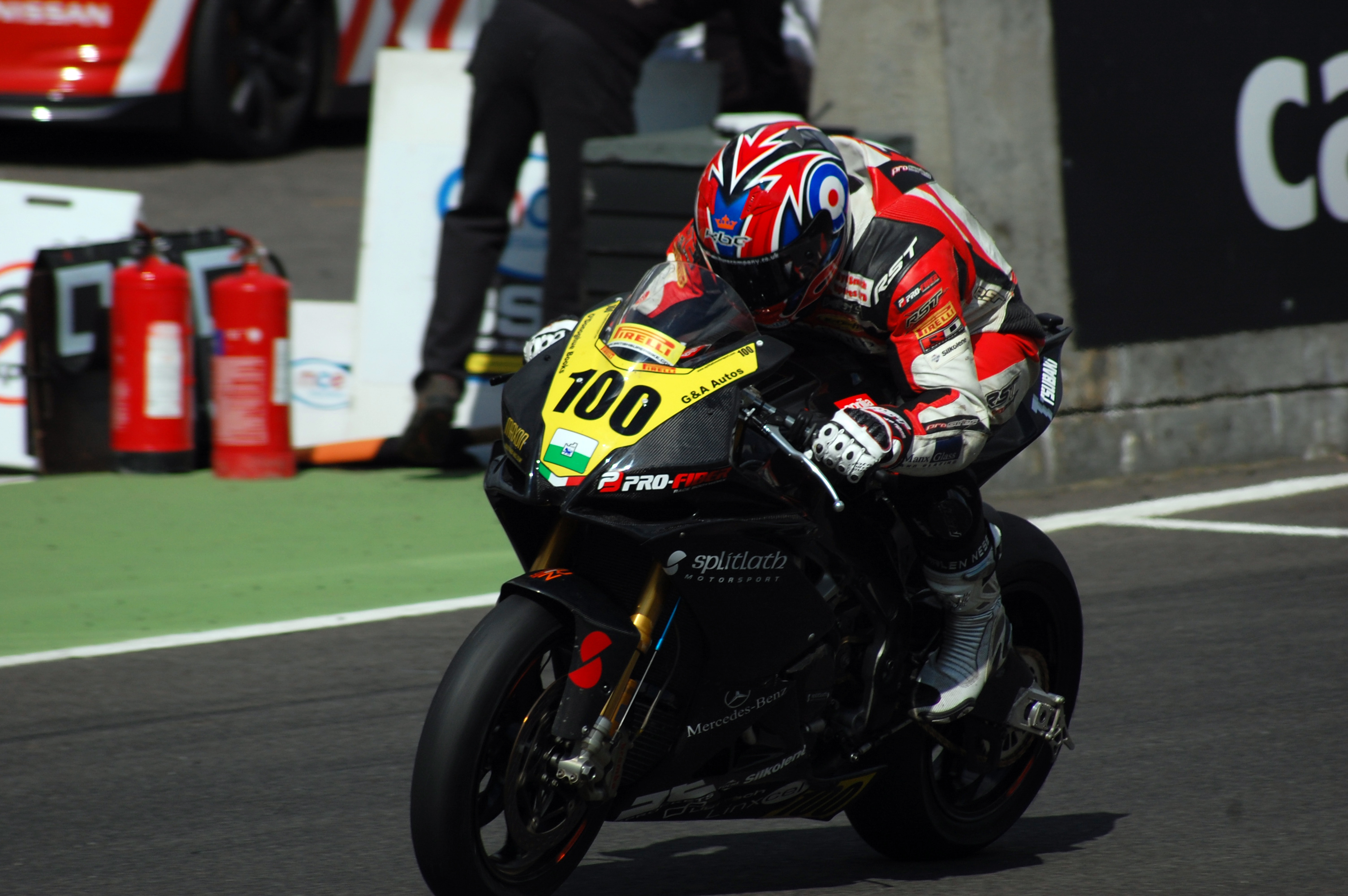
Harris on the start stop straight at Cadwell Park

For 2009, Harris moved to Shaun Muir's Hydrex Bike Devil's Honda team. He was tipped as a dark horse for the title by former rival Leon Haslam, but struggled to meet expectations. Following two second-place finishes in round two of the championship at Oulton Park, Harris struggled to compete with the championship contenders throughout the season. On 4 September 2009, with three rounds of the championship remaining, his contract with the Hydrex Honda team was terminated with immediate effect. having been on a race-by-race deal for much of the season due to Muir being unhappy with his performance He contested the final two rounds on a Sorrymate.com SMT Honda, but crashed heavily in the final meeting at Oulton Park.

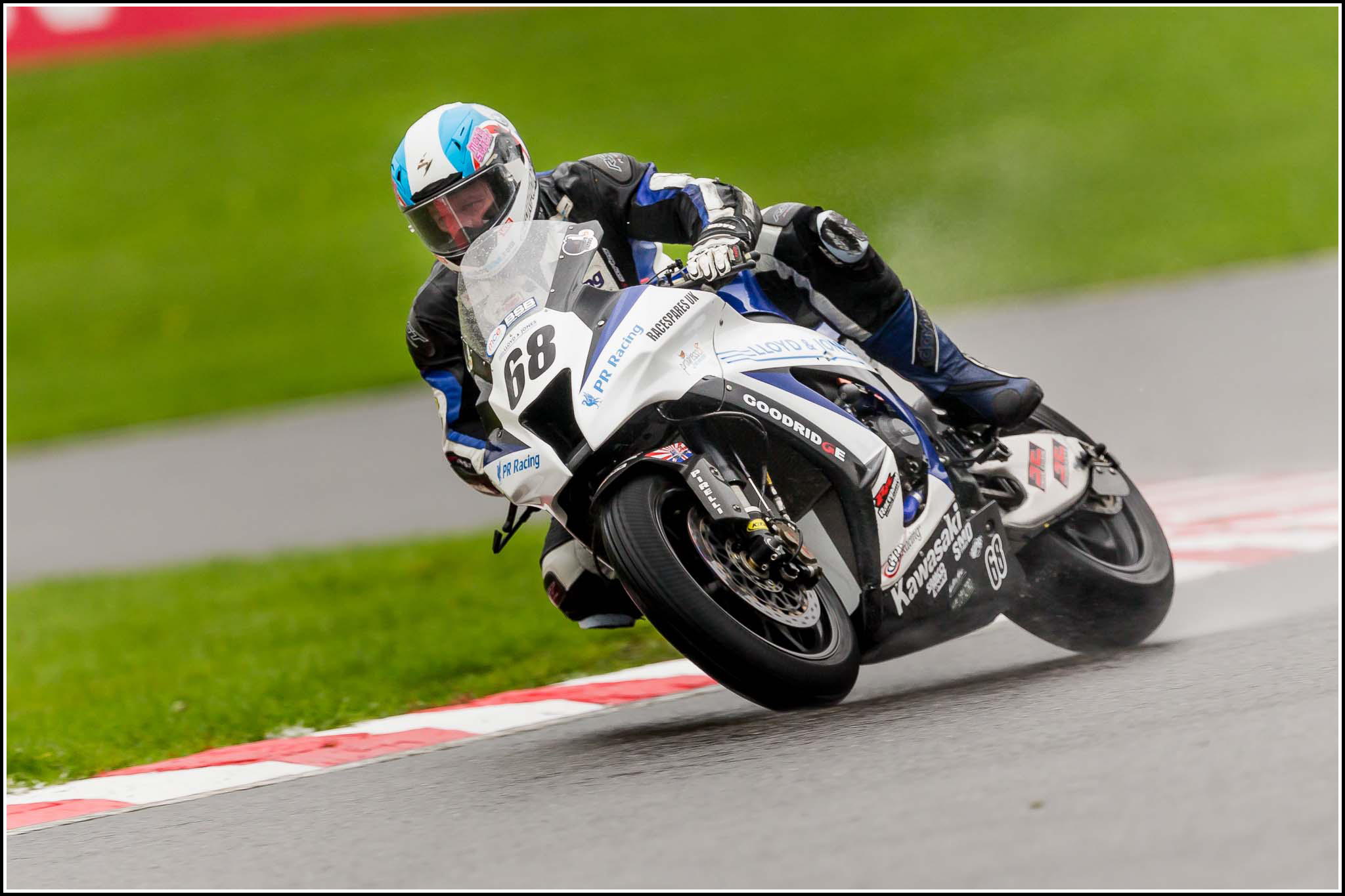
Harris riding for PR Racing in BSB, Brands Hatch, October 2013

For 2010, Harris switched to the British Superstock Championship on a GR Motorsport Aprilia, but left the team after three disappointing races.

In 2012, Harris took the place of Gary Mason in the PR Racing under the banner of Quattro Plant Kawasaki. He raced in a few selected rounds and had some promising finishes including finishing seventh and ninth at Cadwell Park. These results were some of the team's best finishes all season. Harris then continued with PR Racing for the rest of the season racing at Assen (18th), Silverstone (13th) and Brands Hatch (12th).

In 2013, Harris signed a new contract with PR Racing and started his first BSB season since 2009 when he was racing with Hydrex Honda.

== Death ==
Harris died on 3 June 2014 after an incident at Joey's Corner on the second lap of the Superstock Race during the 2014 Isle of Man TT.

== Career results ==
Year	Series	Position
1999	European Superstock Championship	(1st)
2000	British Superbike Championship	(26th)
2001	British Supersport Championship	(1st)
2002	British Superbike Championship	(12th)
2003	British Supersport Championship	(1st)
2004	British Supersport Championship	(1st)
2005	British Superbike Championship	(7th)
2006	British Superbike Championship	(5th)
2007	British Superbike Championship	(11th)
2008	British Superbike Championship	(11th)
2009	British Superbike Championship	(14th)
2012	British Superbike Championship	(Selected rounds)

In 2012 Harris made his TT debut for the SMT Honda racing team finishing 21st in the superbike race and 28th in the superstock race whilst also lapping in excess of 121 mph.

=== British Superbike Championship ===
==== By year ====
(key) (Races in bold indicate pole position; races in italics indicate fastest lap)

Year	Bike	1		2		3		4		5		6		7		8		9		10		11		12		13		Pos	Pts
Year	Bike	R1	R2	R1	R2	R1	R2	R1	R2	R1	R2	R1	R2	R1	R2	R1	R2	R1	R2	R1	R2	R1	R2	R1	R2	R1	R2	Pos	Pts
2005	Honda	BHI; 6	BHI; 6	THR; 6	THR; 8	MAL; Ret	MAL; 6	OUL; 3	OUL; 3	MOP; 4	MOP; 7	CRO; Ret	CRO; Ret	KNO; 8	KNO; 11	SNE; 6	SNE; Ret	SIL; 4	SIL; 9	CAD; 4	CAD; 5	OUL; 8	OUL; 5	DON; Ret	DON; 9	BHGP; Ret	BHGP; Ret	7th	195

Year	Make	1			2			3			4			5			6			7			8			9			10			11			12			13			Pos	Pts
Year	Make	R1	R2	R3	R1	R2	R3	R1	R2	R3	R1	R2	R3	R1	R2	R3	R1	R2	R3	R1	R2	R3	R1	R2	R3	R1	R2	R3	R1	R2	R3	R1	R2	R3	R1	R2	R3	R1	R2	R3	Pos	Pts
2006	Honda	BHI; 2	BHI; 5		DON; 6	DON; Ret		THR; Ret	THR; 3		OUL; 5	OUL; 2		MON; C	MON; C		MAL; 7	MAL; 4		SNE; Ret	SNE; DNS		KNO; 7	KNO; 6		**OUL**; Ret	**OUL**; 2		CRO; 10	CRO; 2		CAD; 10	CAD; 5		SIL; 3	SIL; 6		BHGP; Ret	BHGP; 4		**5th**	**244**
2008	Yamaha	THR; Ret	THR; Ret		OUL; Ret	OUL; Ret		BHGP	BHGP		DON; 7	DON; 7		SNE; 8	SNE; Ret		MAL; Ret	MAL; 5		OUL; 26	OUL; 9		KNO; 7	KNO; 3		CAD; Ret	CAD; 10		CRO; 8	CRO; 8		SIL; Ret	SIL; 5		BHI; DNS	BHI; DNS					11th	102
2009	Honda/Yamaha	BHI; Ret	BHI; 6		OUL; 2	OUL; 2		DON; 6	DON; 18		THR; 11	THR; 9		SNE; 8	SNE; 9		KNO; Ret	KNO; Ret		MAL; Ret	MAL; 7		BHGP; 8	BHGP; 6	BHGP; 14	CAD; 15	CAD; 8		CRO; 14	CRO; 16		SIL; Ret	SIL; 14		OUL; Ret	OUL; DNS	OUL; DNS				**14th**	**124.5**
2010	Yamaha	BHI	BHI		THR	THR		OUL	OUL		CAD	CAD		MAL; Ret	MAL; Ret		KNO	KNO		SNE	SNE	SNE	BHGP	BHGP	BHGP	CAD	CAD		CRO	CRO		SIL	SIL		OUL	OUL	OUL				NC	0
2011	Aprilia	BHI	BHI		OUL	OUL		CRO	CRO		THR	THR		KNO	KNO		SNE	SNE		OUL; Ret	OUL; C		BHGP; Ret	BHGP; Ret	BHGP; Ret	CAD; 15	CAD; 4	CAD; 15	DON; Ret	DON; Ret		SIL; 22	SIL; 22		BHGP; 21	BHGP; 10	BHGP; 18				27th	10
2012	Kawasaki	BHI	BHI; C		THR	THR		OUL	OUL	OUL	SNE	SNE		KNO	KNO		OUL	OUL	OUL	BHGP; 13	BHGP; 12		CAD; 7	CAD; 9		DON; DNS	DON; DNS		ASS; 18	ASS; Ret		SIL; 13	SIL; Ret		BHGP; 12	BHGP; Ret	BHGP; Ret				21st	23

Year	Make	1			2			3			4			5			6			7			8			9			10			11			12			Pos	Pts
Year	Make	R1	R2	R3	R1	R2	R3	R1	R2	R3	R1	R2	R3	R1	R2	R3	R1	R2	R3	R1	R2	R3	R1	R2	R3	R1	R2	R3	R1	R2	R3	R1	R2	R3	R1	R2	R3	Pos	Pts
2013	Kawasaki	BHI; Ret	BHI; 7		THR; 7	THR; Ret		OUL; 16	OUL; Ret		KNO; DNS	KNO; DNS		SNE	SNE		BHGP; 15	BHGP; Ret		OUL; Ret	OUL; Ret	OUL; 17	CAD; 16	CAD; 12		DON; Ret	DON; Ret		ASS	ASS		SIL; 18	SIL; DNS		BHGP; Ret	BHGP; Ret	BHGP; Ret	21st	23

=== British Supersport Championship ===
(key) (Races in bold indicate pole position, races in italics indicate fastest lap)

Year	Bike	1	2	3	4	5	6	7	8	9	10	11	12	Pos	Pts
2010	Triumph	BHI	THR	OUL	CAD	MAL	KNO	SNE	BHGP; Ret	CAD; 9	CRO; Ret	SIL; Ret	OUL; Ret	26th	7
