= Luke Mossey =

British motorcycle racer (born 1992)

- Nationality: English
- Born: 22 September 1992 (age 34); Cambridge, England, UK
- Current team: Bournemouth Kawasaki
- Bike number: 12
- Website: Luke Mossey
Motorcycle racing career statistics
Superbike World Championship
Active years	2021
Manufacturers	Kawasaki
Championships	0
2021 championship position	27th (2 pts)
Starts / Wins / Podiums / Poles / F. laps / Points; 3 / 0 / 0 / 0 / 0 / 2

Luke Mossey (born September 22, 1992) is a British motorcycle rider competing in the 2021 British Superstock 1000 Championship aboard a Kawasaki ZX-10RR. Mossey has competed in a number of different classes during his career, including a wildcard ride in a 250cc grand prix.

In June 2021, Mossey was selected as a replacement rider for Team Pedercini competing at the British round of World Superbikes at Donington Park.

== Career statistics ==
Correct as of 25 June 2012

2010 - 15th, European Superstock 600 Championship, Yamaha YZF-R6
2013 - NC, European Superstock 600 Championship, Yamaha YZF-R6

=== All time ===
Series	Years active	Races	Poles	Podiums	**Wins**	**2nd place**	**3rd place**	Fast Laps	Titles
British 125cc	^{2008}	1	0	0	0	0	0	0	0
British 125cc ACU Cup	^{2008}	1	0	1	0	0	1	0	0
250cc	^{2009}	1	0	0	0	0	0	0	0
British Superstock 600	^{2009}	11	5	5	5	0	0	3	0
British Supersport Cup (C)	^{2010}	8	8	4	4	0	0	6	0
British Supersport (BSS)	^{2010–}	38		3	2	1	2	0	0
Total		48^{1}	13	12	9	1	3	9	0

1. – Total includes all British Supersport Championship rides, riding in the Supersport Cup class doesn't count as a separate ride.

=== By season ===
Season	Class	Motorcycle	Team	Number	Race	Win	Podium	Pole	FLap	Pts	Plcd
2009	250cc	Aprilia	Sabresport Grand Prix	64	1	0	0	0	0	0	NC
Total					**1**	**0**	**0**	**0**	**0**	**0**	

=== Races by year ===
Year	Class	Bike	1	2	3	4	5	6	7	8	9	10	11	12	13	14	15	16	Pos	Points
2009	250cc	Aprilia	QAT	JPN	SPA	FRA	ITA	CAT	NED	GER	GBR; 18	CZE	INP	RSM	POR	AUS	MAL	VAL	NC	0

=== British 125cc Championship ===
Year	Bike	1	2	3	4	5	6	7	8	9	10	11	12	Pos	Pts	Ref
2008	Honda	THR; 9	OUL	BHGP	DON	SNE	MAL	OUL	KNO	CAD	CRO	SIL	BHI	25th	7	
2008^{1}	Honda	THR; 3	OUL	BHGP	DON	SNE	MAL	OUL	KNO	CAD	CRO	SIL	BHI	21st	16	

=== British Superstock 600 Championship ===
Year	Bike	1	2	3	4	5	6	7	8	9	10	11	12	Pos	Pts	Ref
2009	Yamaha	BHI	OUL; 7	DON; 7	**THR**; 1	**SNE**; Ret	KNO; 1	KNO; Ret	**BHGP**; 1	CAD; Ret	**CRO**; 1	**SIL**; DSQ	OUL; 1	**2nd**	**143**	

=== British Supersport Championship ===
Year	Bike	1	2	3	4	5	6	7	8	9	10	11	12	Pos	Pts	Ref
2010	Triumph	BHI; 13	THR; DNS	OUL	CAD	MAL; 9	KNO; 11	SNE; Ret	BHGP; Ret	CAD; 12	CRO	SIL; Ret	OUL; 10	17th	25	
2010^{2}	Triumph	BHI	**THR**; DNS	OUL	CAD	**MAL**; 9	**KNO**; 11	**SNE**; Ret	**BHGP**; Ret	**CAD**; 12	CRO	**SIL**; Ret	**OUL**; 10	6th	100	

Year	Bike	1		2		3		4		5		6		7		8		9		10		11		12			Pos	Pts	Ref
Year	Bike	R1	R2	R1	R2	R1	R2	R1	R2	R1	R2	R1	R2	R1	R2	R1	R2	R1	R2	R1	R2	R1	R2	R1	R2	R3	Pos	Pts	Ref
2011	Triumph	BRH; 7	BRH; 8	OUL; 6	OUL; 4	CRO; 13	CRO; Ret	THR; 9	THR; 7	KNO; 5	KNO; 7	SNE; 3	SNE; 3	OUL; 7	OUL; C	BRH; 6	BRH; DNS	CAD	CAD	DON	DON	SIL; 2	SIL; 4	BRH; 6	BRH; 23	BRH; 11	8th	178	
2012	Triumph	BHI; Ret	BHI; 21	THR; 5	THR; 4	OUL; 8	OUL; 9	SNE; 4	SNE; Ret	KNO; 6	KNO; 5	OUL	OUL	BHGP	BHGP	CAD	CAD	DON	DON	ASS	ASS	SIL	SIL	BHGP	BHGP		8th*	73*	

* Denotes season still in progress

==== Notes ====
1. – Mossey competed in the British 125cc ACU academy Cup.
2. – Mossey competed in the British Supersport Privateers Championship (Supersport Cup).

=== European Superstock 600 ===
==== Races by year ====
(key) (Races in bold indicate pole position, races in italics indicate fastest lap)

Year	Bike	1	2	3	4	5	6	7	8	9	10	Pos	Pts
2010	Yamaha	POR	VAL	ASS	MNZ	MIS	BRN	SIL; 1	NÜR	IMO	MAG	16th	25
2013	Yamaha	ARA	ASS	MNZ	POR	IMO	SIL1; Ret	SIL2; 17	NÜR	MAG	JER	NC	0

=== British Superbike Championship ===
==== By year ====
(key) (Races in bold indicate pole position; races in italics indicate fastest lap)

Year	Make	1		2		3			4		5		6			7		8			9			10		11		12			Pos	Pts
Year	Make	R1	R2	R1	R2	R1	R2	R3	R1	R2	R1	R2	R1	R2	R3	R1	R2	R1	R2	R3	R1	R2	R3	R1	R2	R1	R2	R1	R2	R3	Pos	Pts
2015	Kawasaki	DON; 15	DON; 19	BHI; 12	BHI; 24	OUL; Ret	OUL; 13		SNE; 9	SNE; 13	KNO; 8	KNO; Ret	BHGP; 7	BHGP; 7		THR; 6	THR; 3	CAD; 7	CAD; 6		OUL; 6	OUL; 4	OUL; 11	ASS; Ret	ASS; 3	SIL; Ret	SIL; 10	BHGP; 7	BHGP; 7	BHGP; 6	7th	168
2016	Honda	SIL; 4	SIL; 10	OUL; 16	OUL; Ret	**BHI**; 5	**BHI**; 10		KNO; 3	KNO; 12	SNE; 7	SNE; 13	THR; 3	THR; 4		**BHGP**; 3	**BHGP**; 7	CAD; 12	CAD; 9		OUL; 7	OUL; 5	OUL; 2	DON; Ret	DON; 8	ASS; 7	ASS; 5	BHGP; 13	BHGP; 10	BHGP; 9	6th	550
2017	Kawasaki	DON; 2	DON; 5	BHI; 1	BHI; 1	OUL; 3	OUL; 5		**KNO**; 2	**KNO**; 4	SNE; Ret	SNE; 10	BHGP; 12	BHGP; 6		THR; DNS	THR; DNS	CAD	CAD		SIL; 5	SIL; 12	SIL; Ret	OUL; Ret	OUL; DNS	ASS; 12	ASS; Ret	BHGP; 12	BHGP; 14	BHGP; 17	9th	186
2018	Kawasaki	DON; 5	DON; 8	BHI; 15	BHI; 13	OUL; Ret	OUL; Ret		SNE; Ret	SNE; DNS	KNO; 12	KNO; 12	BHGP; Ret	BHGP; 13		THR; 7	**THR**; 8	CAD; 12	CAD; 10		SIL; 7	SIL; 8	SIL; DNS	OUL; Ret	OUL; 7	ASS; 14	ASS; 15	BHGP; 12	BHGP; 11	BHGP; Ret	16th	97

Year	Bike	1		2		3			4		5		6		7		8		9			10		11		12			Pos	Pts
Year	Bike	R1	R2	R1	R2	R1	R2	R3	R1	R2	R1	R2	R1	R2	R1	R2	R1	R2	R1	R2	R3	R1	R2	R1	R2	R1	R2	R3	Pos	Pts
2019	Suzuki	SIL; 4	SIL; 6	OUL; Ret	OUL; 14	DON; Ret	DON; 14	DON; 12	BRH; 11	BRH; 11	KNO; 7	KNO; 8	SNE; 8	SNE; 9	THR; 10	THR; 9	CAD	CAD	OUL; 12	OUL; 10	OUL; 11	ASS; 12	ASS; Ret	DON; 9	DON; 11	BHGP; DNS	BHGP; 15	BHGP; 12	12th	122

Year	Bike	1			2			3			4			5			6			7			8			9			10			11			Pos	Pts
Year	Bike	R1	R2	R3	R1	R2	R3	R1	R2	R3	R1	R2	R3	R1	R2	R3	R1	R2	R3	R1	R2	R3	R1	R2	R3	R1	R2	R3	R1	R2	R3	R1	R2	R3	Pos	Pts
2020	BMW	DON; 6	DON; 17	DON; 13	SNE; 12	SNE; 9	SNE; 12	SIL; 11	SIL; Ret	SIL; 10	OUL; 11	OUL; 9	OUL; 10	DON; 11	DON; 9	DON; 9	BHGP; 11	BHGP; 6	BHGP; 12																11th	95
2021	Honda	OUL	OUL	OUL	KNO	KNO	KNO	BHGP	BHGP	BHGP	THR	THR	THR	DON	DON	DON	CAD	CAD	CAD	SNE	SNE	SNE	SIL	SIL	SIL	OUL	OUL	OUL	DON	DON	DON	**BHGP**; 15	BHGP; 13	BHGP; 16	28th	4
2022	Honda/BMW	SIL; 19	SIL; Ret	SIL; Ret	OUL; 24	OUL; Ret	OUL; DNS	DON; DNS	DON; DNS	DON; DNS	KNO; 20	KNO; Ret	KNO; Ret	BRH; 16	BRH; Ret	BRH; 17	THR; Ret	THR; Ret	THR; DNS	CAD	CAD	CAD	SNE; DNS	SNE; DNS	SNE; DNS	OUL	OUL	OUL	DON; 23	DON; Ret	DON; DNS	BRH	BRH	BRH	NC	0
2023	BMW	SIL; 21	SIL; 14	SIL; Ret	OUL; 13	OUL; 13	OUL; 19	DON; 19	DON; Ret	DON; Ret	KNO; 14	KNO; 14	KNO; 11	SNE; 14	SNE; 19	SNE; Ret	BRH; 18	BRH; Ret	BRH; Ret	THR; 12	THR; 16	THR; 12	CAD; 15	CAD; 13	CAD; Ret	OUL; Ret	OUL; 15	OUL; Ret	DON; 3	DON; Ret	DON; 11	BRH; 12	BRH; 15	BRH; Ret	17th	67
2024	Kawasaki	NAV	NAV		OUL	OUL	OUL	DON; 16	DON; 14	DON; Ret	KNO	KNO	KNO	SNE	SNE	SNE	BRH	BRH	BRH	THR	THR	THR	CAD	CAD	CAD	OUL	OUL	OUL	DON	DON	DON	BRH	BRH	BRH	31st	2

=== Superbike World Championship ===
==== Races by year ====
(key) (Races in bold indicate pole position, races in italics indicate fastest lap)

Year	Bike	1			2			3			4			5			6			7			8			9			10			11			12			13			Pos	Pts
Year	Bike	R1	SR	R2	R1	SR	R2	R1	SR	R2	R1	SR	R2	R1	SR	R2	R1	SR	R2	R1	SR	R2	R1	SR	R2	R1	SR	R2	R1	SR	R2	R1	SR	R2	R1	SR	R2	R1	SR	R2	Pos	Pts
2021	Kawasaki	SPA	SPA	SPA	POR	POR	POR	ITA	ITA	ITA	GBR; 14	GBR; 17	GBR; 16	NED	NED	NED	CZE	CZE	CZE	SPA	SPA	SPA	FRA	FRA	FRA	SPA	SPA	SPA	SPA	SPA	SPA	POR	POR	POR	ARG	ARG	ARG	INA	INA	INA	27th	2
