= Anthony Rogers (motorcyclist) =

British motorcycle racer

- Nationality: British
- Born: 3 April 1990 (age 36); Norwich, Norfolk, England, United Kingdom

Anthony Derek Rogers (born 3 April 1990 in Norwich, Norfolk) is a Grand Prix motorcycle racer from United Kingdom.

== Career statistics ==
=== By season ===
Season	Class	Motorcycle	Team	Race	Win	Podium	Pole	FLap	Pts	Plcd
2006	125cc	Honda	KRP	1	0	0	0	0	0	NC
Total				**1**	**0**	**0**	**0**	**0**	**0**	

=== Races by year ===
(key)

Year	Class	Bike	1	2	3	4	5	6	7	8	9	10	11	12	13	14	15	16	Pos.	Pts
2006	125cc	Honda	SPA	QAT	TUR	CHN	FRA	ITA	CAT	NED	GBR; 30	GER	CZE	MAL	AUS	JPN	POR	VAL	NC	0

=== British Supersport Championship ===
==== Races by year ====
(key) (Races in bold indicate pole position, races in italics indicate fastest lap)

Year	Bike	1		2		3		4		5		6		7		8		9		10		11		12		Pos	Pts
Year	Bike	R1	R2	R1	R2	R1	R2	R1	R2	R1	R2	R1	R2	R1	R2	R1	R2	R1	R2	R1	R2	R1	R2	R1	R2	Pos	Pts
2012	Triumph	BHI; Ret	BHI; 17	THR; Ret	THR; 24	OUL	OUL	SNE	SNE	KNO	KNO	OUL	OUL	BHGP	BHGP	CAD	CAD	DON	DON	ASS	ASS	SIL	SIL	BHGP	BHGP	NC	0
