= British Supersport Championship =

British national motorcycle road race series

- Sport: Motorcycle sport
- No. of teams: Seven manufacturers (Ducati, Honda, Kawasaki, Suzuki, Triumph, Yamaha, MV)
- Most recent champion: Benjamin Currie (Ducati)

British Supersport Championship is a support series to the British Superbike Championship (BSB) for engine capacities smaller than Superbike. British Supersport runs one or two rounds per weekend at each BSB event. The BSS Championship is seen as a stepping stone for the younger talent to progress to the British Superbike Championship or to World level classes. Riders such as: Tom Sykes, Cal Crutchlow, Sam Lowes, Alex Lowes, Jonathan Rea, Leon Camier and Rory Skinner; all raced in this championship during their early careers.

From 2018, a new British GP2 class was introduced to be run within existing Supersport races. Devised by MSVR, it is based on Moto2 Honda-engined machines.

From 2023 season onwards, new engine regulations are in force allowing larger engines to be used, dependent on the number of cylinders, from manufacturers such as Ducati and MV.

During round 1 of the 2025 season at Oulton Park on 5 May, 11 riders were involved in a "chain reaction" crash at the first corner. Two riders, 21-year-old Owen Jenner from England and 29-year-old Shane Richardson from New Zealand died of their injuries the same day, and a third, 47-year-old Tom Tunstall suffered serious injuries.

== Race weekend ==
Friday

- Practice 1 (40 Mins)
- Practice 2 (40 Mins)

Saturday

- Qualifying (30 minutes)
- Sprint race (reduced laps)

Sunday

- Warm Up (10 Mins)
- Full race

== Scoring system ==
Current Points System
| Position | 1 | 2 | 3 | 4 | 5 | 6 | 7 | 8 | 9 | 10 | 11 | 12 | 13 | 14 | 15 |
|---|---|---|---|---|---|---|---|---|---|---|---|---|---|---|---|
| Points | 25 | 20 | 16 | 13 | 11 | 10 | 9 | 8 | 7 | 6 | 5 | 4 | 3 | 2 | 1 |

== Machines used ==
=== Supersport ===
- Ducati Panigale V2
- Honda CBR600RR
- Kawasaki Ninja ZX-6R, Kawasaki 636
- Suzuki GSX-R600, Suzuki GSX-R750R
- Triumph Daytona 675, Triumph 765
- Yamaha YZF-R6
- MV F3 675, MV 800

* For the 2021 season, oversize engines were allowed as a 'pilot' scheme prior to full implementation in 2022

* From 2022, machines including extra capacity engines followed FIM homologation requirements

=== British GP2 ===
- Various chassis makes, as seen in Moto2; when previously competed in Moto2, using only Honda 600 cc engines
- Any other chassis (or modified stock chassis)
- Four cylinder engines over 400 cc to 600 cc
- Three cylinder engines over 500 cc to 675 cc

== British Supersport Champions ==
| Season | Class | Rider | Motorcycle | Notes | Ref |
|---|---|---|---|---|---|
| 1989 | Supersport 600 | (England) Paul Brookes | Yamaha | | |
| 1990 | Supersport 600 | (England) John Reynolds | Kawasaki | | |
| 1991 | Supersport 600 | (Scotland) Ian Simpson | Yamaha | | |
| 1992 | Supersport 600 | (England) Phil Borley | Honda | | |
| 1993 | Supersport 600 | (Scotland) Jim Moodie | Honda | | |
| 1994 | Supersport 600 | (Scotland) Ian Simpson | Honda | | |
| 1995 | Supersport 600 | (England) Mike Edwards | Honda | | |
| 1996 | Supercup Thunderbike | (England) Dave Heal | Honda | | |
| 1997 | Supersport 600 | (England) Paul Brown | Honda | | |
| 1998 | Supersport 600 | (Scotland) John Crawford | Suzuki | | |
| 1999 | Supersport 600 | (Scotland) John Crawford | Suzuki | | |
| 2000 | Supersport | (Scotland) Jim Moodie | Yamaha | | |
| 2001 | Supersport | (England) Karl Harris | Suzuki | | |
| 2002 | Supersport | (Scotland) Stuart Easton | Ducati | | |
| 2003 | Supersport | (England) Karl Harris | Honda | | |
| 2004 | Supersport | (England) Karl Harris | Honda | Harris Finished on 232 points with 6 wins and 2 DNFs from 13 races | |
| 2005 | Supersport | (England) Leon Camier | Honda | Camier finished with 202 points including 4 wins and 2 DNFs in 13 races | |
| 2006 | Supersport | (England) Cal Crutchlow | Honda | Crutchlow won the title easily with 242 Points 6 wins and 2 DNFs from 13 races | |
| 2007 | Supersport | (Northern Ireland) Michael Laverty | Suzuki | | |
| 2008 | Supersport | (Australia) Glen Richards | Triumph | Richards collected a total of 240 points with 4 wins and 0 DNFs from 12 races | |
| 2009 | Supersport | (England) Steve Plater | Honda | 215 Points with 4 wins | |
| 2010 | Supersport | (England) Sam Lowes | Honda | | |
| 2011 | Supersport | (Northern Ireland) Alastair Seeley | Suzuki | | |
| 2012 | Supersport | (Australia) Glen Richards | Triumph | | |
| 2013 | Supersport | (Scotland) Stuart Easton | Yamaha | | |
| 2014 | Supersport | (Australia) Billy McConnell | Triumph | | |
| 2015 | Supersport | (England) Luke Stapleford | Triumph | | |
| 2016 | Supersport | (Scotland) Tarran Mackenzie | Kawasaki | | |
| 2017 | Supersport | (Northern Ireland) Keith Farmer | Yamaha | | |
| 2018 | Supersport | (Republic of Ireland) Jack Kennedy | Yamaha | | |
| 2019 | Supersport | (Republic of Ireland) Jack Kennedy | Integro Yamaha | | |
| 2020 | Supersport | (Scotland) Rory Skinner | Yamaha | Youngest ever champion at 19 years and seven days | |
| 2021 | Supersport | (Republic of Ireland) Jack Kennedy | Kawasaki | | |
| 2022 | Supersport | (Republic of Ireland) Jack Kennedy | Yamaha | | |
| 2023 | Supersport | (Australia) Ben Currie | Ducati | Champion with 406 points, 6 wins and 14 podium places overall | |
| 2024 | Supersport | (Republic of Ireland) Jack Kennedy | Honda | Champion with 5 titles | |
| 2025 | Supersport | (Republic of Ireland) Rhys Irwin | Kawasaki | | |

== British GP2 Champions ==
| Season | Class | Rider | Motorcycle | Notes |
|---|---|---|---|---|
| 2018 | GP2 | (United Kingdom) Josh Owens | Kalex | |
| 2019 | GP2 | (United Kingdom) Kyle Ryde | Kalex | |
| 2020 | GP2 | (United Kingdom) Mason Law | Spirit | |
| 2021 | GP2 | (United Kingdom) Charlie Nesbitt | Kalex | 470 points, 95 points ahead of 2nd placed Mason Law |
| 2022 | GP2 | (United Kingdom) Jack Scott | Kalex | 376 points, 55 points ahead of 2nd placed Cameron Fraser |
| 2023 | GP2 | (United Kingdom) Cameron Fraser | Chassis Factory | 513 points, 83 points ahead of 2nd placed Harry Rowlings |
| 2024 | GP2 | (United Kingdom) Owen Jenner | Krämer | |

== 2025 deaths ==
On 5 May 2025, a crash at Oulton Park during the British Supersport Championship killed two riders; Owen Jenner and Shane Richardson.

== See also ==
- Superbike racing
- Grand Prix motorcycle racing
