= Torrens Trophy =

British motorcycling award

- Awarded for: "Outstanding Contribution to the Cause or Technical Excellence of Safe and Skilful Motorcycling in the UK"
- Country: United Kingdom
- Presented by: Royal Automobile Club
- First award: 1979
- Currently held by: Padgett's Motorcycles (2025)

The Torrens Trophy is awarded to an individual or organisation for demonstrating "Outstanding Contribution to the Cause or Technical Excellence of Safe and Skilful Motorcycling in the UK". It is named in honour of The Motor Cycle editor and Royal Automobile Club (RAC) vice-president Arthur Bourne, who wrote a column under the pen name Torrens. The RAC established the trophy to recognise "outstanding contributions to motor cycle safety" before extending its purpose to include individuals considered to be "the finest motor cyclists". The trophy, an eight-pint silver tankard, has been awarded infrequently since 1979 by the Torrens Trophy Nominations Committee, which is composed of a panel of experts; it is only presented if, in the opinion of the RAC, the achievement can be justified to deserve the award. The recipient is honoured at a ceremony at the RAC's Pall Mall clubhouse and headquarters in London.

The inaugural recipient was the RAC/Auto-Cycle Union national training scheme organiser Frederick Lovegrove in 1979. It has been awarded to five organisations in its history, the Transport and Road Laboratory in 1980 for promoting safer motorcycle braking systems, the German automotive marque BMW nine years later for the development of its anti-lock braking system for its production motorcycles, Crescent Yamaha in 2021 for winning all three titles in that season's Superbike World Championship, motorcycle manufacturer Triumph Motorcycles Ltd in 2023 for its contribution of supplying three-cylinder engines to the Moto2 World Championship, and racing team Padgett's Motorcycles in 2025 for its six-deade contribution to British motorcycle racing.

Emma Bristow was the first woman motor cyclist to be awarded the accolade when she was named the 2020 recipient. Since its establishment, the award has not been presented during six periods in history: from 1982 to 1988, between 1990 and 1997, from 1999 to 2007, between 2009 and 2012 and in 2024. As of 2025, the accolade has been awarded eighteen times: Superbike riders have won it four times, with road motorbike racers recognised twice, and Grand Prix motorcycle riders and motorcycle speedway competitors honoured once. The 2025 recipient is the English privateer motorcycling racing team Padgett's Motorcycles.

== Recipients ==
Key
†	Indicates posthumous award

Recipients of the Torrens Trophy
Year	Image	Recipient	Nationality	Citation	Ref(s)
1979		Frederick Lovegrove †	GBR	—N/a	
1980		Transport and Road Laboratory	GBR	"for its work in promoting safer braking systems for motorcycles"	
1981		Dave Taylor	GBR	"for his vast contribution to motorcycle road safety"	
1982–1988	Not awarded				
1989		BMW	DEU	"for their contribution to motor cycle safety through their development of their anti-lock braking system"	
1990–1997	Not awarded				
1998		Ian Kerr	GBR	"for 20-years of tireless work in promoting safe and responsible motorcycling"	
1999–2007	Not awarded				
2008	A man in his mid-20s wearing a red baseball cap and motorcycle overalls	James Toseland	GBR	"for his immense contribution to raising the profile of motor cycle racing in this country"	
2009–2012	Not awarded				
2013	A man in his late twenties is smiling and wearing green and black motorcycling overalls	Tom Sykes	GBR	"for being crowned the 15th World Superbike Champion, the fourth from Great Britain and only the second rider to win for Kawasaki in the series for 20 years"	
2014	A man in his late 30s is wearing white motorcycling overalls with red stripes looking at his left hand and holding a crash helmet in his right hand	Shane Byrne (Note: MotoGP rider Scott Redding, 2014 TT season champion Michael Dunlop and multiple TT winner John McGuiness received nominations for the award in 2014.)	GBR	"for becoming the first man in history to be crowned MCE Insurance British Superbike Championship on four occasions (2003, 2008, 2012 and 2014)"	
2015	A man in his mid-30s is wearing a red baseball cap and a multicoloured motorcycling overalls. He is holding a large silver trophy depicting a motorcycle in both his hands on a podium	Ian Hutchinson (Note: 2015 Moto3 champion Danny Kent, World Superbike champion Jonathan Rea and Tai Woffinden, the two-time Speedway World Champion, were nominated for the trophy in 2015.)	GBR	"for his outstanding determination, courage and overcoming adversity to win multiple TTs"	
2016	A man sporting a stubble is wearing a black baseball cap with a sponsors logo and a white T-shirt. He is looking away from the camera and holding a blue marker pen in his left hand	Cal Crutchlow (Note: Dunlop and Rea earned nominations for the accolade in 2016.)	GBR	"for being the first British rider to win a premier class World Championship Motorcycle Grand Prix in 35 years"	
2017	A man sporting a stubble is looking to the right of the camera and is wearing black and green motorcycling overall	Jonathan Rea (Note: Dakar Rally motorcycle winner Sam Sunderland and motorcycle rider Leon Haslam received nominations for the trophy in 2017.)	GBR	"for being the first rider to win three consecutive World Superbike Championships"	
2018	A man in his early twenties wearing a black baseball cap and speedway overalls with sponsors logos. He is sporting tattoos on his necks and hands and his holding a miniature Union Jack in his right hand	Tai Woffinden (Note: Sidecar world champions Ben and Tom Birchall, Haslam and 2018 Isle of Man TT senior victor Peter Hickman were nominated for the award in 2018.)	GBR	"for being the most successful British speedway rider in history"	
2019	A man in his late 20s in the distance who wearing a T-shirt and sporting a dark coloured baseball cap is staring at a BMW racing bike.	Peter Hickman (Note: Hickman, Redding and Moto2 control engine supplier Triumph Motorcycles Ltd were nominated for the trophy in 2019.)	GBR	"for his three Isle of Man TT victories and for setting the world's fastest road race lap record of 136.415 miles per hour (219.539 km/h) at the Ulster GP"	
2020	A woman in her mid-20s wearing a blue and yellow open-face crash helmet and motorcross overalls	Emma Bristow	GBR	"for claiming her 7th consecutive FIM Women's Trial World Championship"	
2021		Crescent Yamaha	GBR	"for winning the riders, teams & manufacturers titles in the 2021 FIM World Superbike Championship"	
2022		Mike Trimby	GBR	"for his tireless work to improve circuit safety and represent the riders, teams and commercial side of MotoGP"	
2023		Triumph Motorcycles Ltd	GBR	"for its sterling work in the Moto2 World Championship"	
2024	Not awarded				
2025		Padgett's Motorcycles	GBR	"in acknowledgement of more than six decades of contribution to British motorcycle racing"	
