= 2003 British Superbike Championship =

British Superbike Championship

The 2003 British Superbike season was the 16th British Superbike Championship season. Shane Byrne became the 2003 British Superbike Champion on a MonsterMob Ducati 998 F02. The Privateers' Cup was reintroduced and won by Dave Wood on a Suzuki GSX-R 1000.

== Calendar ==
2003 British Superbike Championship Calendar
Round		Circuit	Date	Pole position	Fastest lap	Winning rider	Winning team	Ref
1	R1	(England) Silverstone International	30 March	(England) Michael Rutter	(Japan) Yukio Kagayama	(England) Shane Byrne	MonsterMob Ducati	
1	R2	(England) Silverstone International	30 March	(England) Michael Rutter	(England) Michael Rutter	(England) Michael Rutter	Team Renegade Ducati	
2	R1	(England) Snetterton	13 April	(England) Shane Byrne	(England) Shane Byrne	(England) Michael Rutter	Team Renegade Ducati	
2	R2	(England) Snetterton	13 April	(England) Shane Byrne	(England) Shane Byrne	(England) Shane Byrne	MonsterMob Ducati	
3	R1	(England) Thruxton	20 April	(England) Michael Rutter	(England) Shane Byrne	(England) Shane Byrne	MonsterMob Ducati	
3	R2	(England) Thruxton	20 April	(England) Michael Rutter	(England) Steve Plater	(England) Shane Byrne	MonsterMob Ducati	
4	R1	(England) Oulton Park	5 May	(England) Shane Byrne	(England) Shane Byrne	(England) Shane Byrne	MonsterMob Ducati	
4	R2	(England) Oulton Park	5 May	(England) Shane Byrne	(England) Shane Byrne	(England) Shane Byrne	MonsterMob Ducati	
5	R1	(Scotland) Knockhill	18 May	(England) Michael Rutter	(England) Michael Rutter	(England) Shane Byrne	MonsterMob Ducati	
5	R2	(Scotland) Knockhill	18 May	(England) Michael Rutter	(England) John Reynolds	(England) Shane Byrne	MonsterMob Ducati	
6	R1	(England) Brands Hatch Indy	22 June	(England) John Reynolds	(England) Shane Byrne	(England) Shane Byrne	MonsterMob Ducati	
6	R2	(England) Brands Hatch Indy	22 June	(England) John Reynolds	(England) John Reynolds	(England) John Reynolds	Crescent Suzuki	
7	R1	(England) Rockingham	6 July	(England) Shane Byrne	(Japan) Yukio Kagayama	(Japan) Yukio Kagayama	Crescent Suzuki	
7	R2	(England) Rockingham	6 July	(England) Shane Byrne	(Japan) Yukio Kagayama	(Japan) Yukio Kagayama	Crescent Suzuki	
8	R1	(Republic of Ireland) Mondello Park	20 July	(England) Shane Byrne	(England) Sean Emmett	(England) John Reynolds	Crescent Suzuki	
8	R2	(Republic of Ireland) Mondello Park	20 July	(England) Shane Byrne	(England) John Reynolds	(England) John Reynolds	Crescent Suzuki	
9	R1	(England) Oulton Park	10 August	(Japan) Yukio Kagayama	(England) John Reynolds	(England) Steve Plater	Honda Racing UK	
9	R2	(England) Oulton Park	10 August	(Japan) Yukio Kagayama	(England) John Reynolds	(Japan) Yukio Kagayama	Crescent Suzuki	
10	R1	(England) Cadwell Park	25 August	(England) John Reynolds	(England) John Reynolds	(England) Shane Byrne	MonsterMob Ducati	
10	R2	(England) Cadwell Park	25 August	(England) John Reynolds	(England) Shane Byrne	(England) Steve Plater	Honda Racing UK	
11	R1	(England) Brands Hatch GP	14 September	(England) Michael Rutter	(England) John Reynolds	(England) John Reynolds	Crescent Suzuki	
11	R2	(England) Brands Hatch GP	14 September	(England) Michael Rutter	(Australia) Glen Richards	(England) Sean Emmett	ETI Racing Ducati	
12	R1	(England) Donington Park	28 September	(England) Shane Byrne	(England) Shane Byrne	(England) Shane Byrne	MonsterMob Ducati	
12	R2	(England) Donington Park	28 September	(England) Shane Byrne	(England) Shane Byrne	(England) Shane Byrne	MonsterMob Ducati	

== Entry list ==
2003 British Superbike Championship Entry List
Team	Constructor	No.	Rider	Class	Rounds
Virgin Mobile Yamaha	Yamaha	1	(Scotland) Steve Hislop		1–7
Virgin Mobile Yamaha	Yamaha	8	(England) Gary Mason		All
Virgin Mobile Yamaha	Yamaha	41	(England) Jason Vincent		9
Virgin Mobile Yamaha	Yamaha	41	(England) Chris Burns		10–12
Renegade Ducati	Ducati	2	(England) Michael Rutter		All
Renegade Ducati	Ducati	3	(England) Sean Emmett		1–6
Renegade Ducati	Ducati	91	(England) Leon Haslam		7–12
Renegade Ducati	Ducati	19	(England) Nick Medd		All
MonsterMob Ducati	Ducati	4	(England) Shane Byrne		All
Honda Racing UK	Honda	5	(England) Steve Plater		All
Honda Racing UK	Honda	9	(England) Mark Heckles		2–4, 7–9, 11–12
Rizla Suzuki	Suzuki	6	(England) John Reynolds		All
Rizla Suzuki	Suzuki	71	(Japan) Yukio Kagayama		1–10
Rizla Suzuki	Suzuki	71	(England) Tom Sykes		11
Rizla Suzuki	Suzuki	71	(Scotland) Niall Mackenzie		12
Firepower Ducati	Ducati	10	(England) Dean Ellison		1–5, 9–12
TCD Suzuki	Suzuki	12	(Wales) Paul A. Jones		All
Bill Smith Motors	Yamaha	13	(England) Howie Mainwaring	C	4–10, 12
Carbontek Racing	Suzuki	14	(England) Sam Corke	C	4–12
Carbontek Racing	Suzuki	22	(England) Mark Burr	C	10
www.fwr.co.uk	Suzuki	15	(England) Adam Hitchcox	C	6, 9–10, 12
Buildbase Knotts Motorcycles	Suzuki	15	(England) Luke Quigley	I	7
Buildbase Knotts Motorcycles	Suzuki	44	(England) Andy Tinsley	I	7
John Nisill Racing	Suzuki	16	(England) John Nisill	C	6–10
Darren Thomas Racing	Suzuki	18	(England) Darren Thomas	C	6–9
	Suzuki	20	(Australia) Nigel Arnold	C	6–9
	Suzuki	20	(England) Ben Wilson	C	10–11
Team Slipstream Racing	Suzuki	21	(England) Phil Giles	C	9–12
Zig-Zag Kingsbury Racing	Suzuki	23	(England) Denver Robb	C	8
JP Racing	Suzuki	24	(Republic of Ireland) Jamie Patterson	C	8
Hobbs Racing	Suzuki	25	(England) Dennis Hobbs	C	4–12
Dave Wood Racing	Suzuki	26	(England) Dave Wood	C	4–12
CD Racing	Suzuki	27	(Republic of Ireland) Jonathan Ralph	C	8
Thunderchild Racing	Ducati	27	(England) Vince Whittle	C	12
Mike Walker Racing	Yamaha	28	(England) Mike Walker	C	2–12
Oris Racing	Suzuki	29	(England) Ben Mossey	C	6, 12
Team Powersport Racing	Honda	29	(Republic of Ireland) Hilton Hinks	C	8
Huggys Speedshop	Suzuki	30	(England) Tristan Palmer	I	7
Moto-Tec Racing	Suzuki	30	(England) Mark Buckley	C	9
Lloyds Autobody Racing	Suzuki	31	(England) Steve Brogan	I	7
Lloyds Autobody Racing	Suzuki	32	(England) Jamie Morley	I	7
Mann Racing	Suzuki	31	(England) Chris Heath	C	9–10
Hanson Brick Racing	Yamaha	33	(England) Francis Williamson	C	4–12
T&R Racing	Suzuki	38	(England) Stephen Thompson	C	8
GD Motorcycles	Suzuki	39	(England) Warren Scott	C	10
A. Robinson Racing	Yamaha	43	(England) Ian McCallister	C	8
ZGT Motorcycles	Yamaha	45	(England) Jeremy Goodall	C	4–7, 9–12
Team Superbikes Direct	Suzuki	51	(Republic of Ireland) Paraic Dooley	C	8
C&K Racing	Suzuki	54	(England) Rob Butterworth	C	8
ETI Racing	Ducati	54	(England) John McGuinness		5–6
ETI Racing	Ducati	55	(Scotland) John Crawford		1–6
ETI Racing	Ducati	3	(England) Sean Emmett		7–12
	Suzuki	56	(England) James Buckingham	C	6–12
Alamo Racing	Yamaha	57	(England) Alan Moreton	C	4, 7–8, 10–12
PR Racing	Honda	68	(England) Gordon Blackley	C	4–7, 10–12
PR Racing	Honda	86	(England) Jason Davis	C	8–9, 11–12
B&M Racing Ireland	Suzuki	72	(England) Derek Wilson	C	8
Hawk Racing	Kawasaki	75	(Australia) Glen Richards		All
Hawk Racing	Kawasaki	88	(England) Scott Smart		All
Hawk Racing	Kawasaki	99	(England) Lee Jackson		All
Status Motorsport	Suzuki	77	(Republic of Ireland) Matt Niland	C	8
Neil Cray Racing	Suzuki	85	(England) Neil Cray	C	2–3
TDB Recruit Appleyard Yamaha	Yamaha	96	(Australia) Dean Thomas		1
TDB Recruit Appleyard Yamaha	Yamaha	96	(Australia) Paul Young		2–9
TDB Recruit Appleyard Yamaha	Yamaha	96	(England) Jamie Morley		11
TDB Recruit Appleyard Yamaha	Yamaha	97	(England) Jon Kirkham		All

Icon	Class
C	Privateers Cup

Key
Regular Rider
Wildcard Rider
Replacement Rider

== Championship Standings ==
Points system
Position	1st	2nd	3rd	4th	5th	6th	7th	8th	9th	10th	11th	12th	13th	14th	15th
Race	25	20	16	13	11	10	9	8	7	6	5	4	3	2	1

=== Riders' Championship ===
2003 British Superbike Riders' Championship
Pos	Rider	Bike	SIL (England)		SNE (England)		THR (England)		OUL (England)		KNO (Scotland)		BRH (England)		ROC (England)		MON (Republic of Ireland)		OUL (England)		CAD (England)		BRH (England)		DON (England)		Pts
Pos	Rider	Bike	R1	R2	R1	R2	R1	R2	R1	R2	R1	R2	R1	R2	R1	R2	R1	R2	R1	R2	R1	R2	R1	R2	R1	R2	Pts
1	(England) Shane Byrne	Ducati	1	2	2	1	1	1	1	1	1	1	1	2	2	2	9	2	Ret	4	1	3	3	3	1	1	488
2	(England) John Reynolds	Suzuki	WD		3	3	12	Ret	8	2	3	2	2	1	5	5	1	1	Ret	2	2	2	1	2	3	2	358
3	(England) Michael Rutter	Ducati	4	1	1	Ret	3	2	2	3	15	Ret	Ret	3	4	3	5	5	4	6	3	15	4	9	4	4	289
4	(Australia) Glen Richards	Kawasaki	3	3	5	Ret	4	3	9	8	6	4	6	5	6	Ret	4	3	5	8	5	6	5	4	5	6	255
5	(England) Sean Emmett	Ducati	Ret	Ret	Ret	2	6	7	Ret	Ret	5	8	Ret	4	7	8	2	8	3	3	7	7	2	1	2	3	247
6	(England) Steve Plater	Honda	Ret	10	4	8	5	4	4	Ret	4	3	3	8	3	4	6	6	1	5	Ret	1	7	6	WD		246
7	(Japan) Yukio Kagayama	Suzuki	2	4	Ret	5	9	9	5	4	10	7	Ret	10	1	1	3	Ret	2	1	WD						214
8	(England) Gary Mason	Yamaha	5	8	8	4	7	6	7	9	7	6	4	6	Ret	7	7	4	Ret	Ret	4	5	6	7	8	7	208
9	(England) Scott Smart	Kawasaki	6	7	9	10	13	11	12	13	12	11	7	9	9	6	8	13	6	10	6	14	8	8	6	Ret	154
10	(Scotland) Steve Hislop	Yamaha	8	5	Ret	Ret	2	5	3	5	13	5	5	7	10	11											122
11	(England) Leon Haslam	Ducati													8	9	10	7	8	7	Ret	4	9	5	7	5	98
11	(England) Mark Heckles	Honda			Ret	7	8	8	10	6					Ret	10	11	9	7	9			11	10	11	9	98
11	(England) Lee Jackson	Kawasaki	9	11	11	12	11	12	13	12	11	12	10	13	12	13	13	12	11	14	8	9	13	Ret	12	Ret	98
14	(Australia) Paul Young	Yamaha			7	9	14	14	14	11	2	9	Ret	DNS	Ret	12	Ret	10	10	12							74
14	(Scotland) John Crawford	Ducati	Ret	6	6	6	10	13	6	10	9	Ret	9	11													74
16	(England) Jon Kirkham	Yamaha	Ret	Ret	10	11	Ret	Ret	11	Ret	Ret	13	Ret	15	11	Ret	12	11	Ret	DNS	Ret	11	12	11	10	8	62
17	(England) Dean Ellison	Ducati	7	Ret	Ret	15	Ret	10	Ret	7	Ret	Ret							9	11	Ret	10	14	13	9	Ret	55
18	(Wales) Paul A. Jones	Suzuki	11	12	13	14	15	15	20	15	14	15	Ret	27	Ret	14	14	14	Ret	15	10	13	15	Ret	Ret	10	43
19	(England) Nick Medd	Ducati	DNS		12	13	Ret	18	15	14	22	14	11	14	Ret	Ret	Ret	DNS	13	DNS	9	12	Ret	Ret	Ret	DNS	33
20	(England) John McGuinness	Ducati									8	10	8	12													26
21	(England) Chris Burns	Yamaha																			Ret	8	10	12	Ret	Ret	18
22	(Australia) Dean Thomas	Yamaha	10	9																							13
23	(England) Jason Vincent	Yamaha																	12	13							7
24	(England) Tom Sykes	Suzuki																					Ret	14			2
	(England) Jamie Morley	Yamaha													13	14							Ret	Ret			0
	(Scotland) Niall Mackenzie	Suzuki																							Ret	Ret	0
	(England) Steve Brogan	Suzuki													16	Ret											0
	(England) Luke Quigley	Suzuki													17	18											0
	(England) Tristan Palmer	Suzuki													21	20											0
	(England) Andy Tinsley	Suzuki													Ret	DNS											0
Pos	Rider	Bike	SIL (England)		SNE (England)		THR (England)		OUL (England)		KNO (Scotland)		BRH (England)		ROC (England)		MON (Republic of Ireland)		OUL (England)		CAD (England)		BRH (England)		DON (England)		Pts

Colour	Result
Gold	Winner
Silver	Second place
Bronze	Third place
Green	Points classification
Blue	Non-points classification
Blue	Non-classified finish (NC)
Purple	Retired, not classified (Ret)
Red	Did not qualify (DNQ)
Red	Did not pre-qualify (DNPQ)
Black	Disqualified (DSQ)
White	Did not start (DNS)
White	Withdrew (WD)
White	Race cancelled (C)
Blank	Did not practice (DNP)
Blank	Did not arrive (DNA)
Blank	Excluded (EX)

=== Privateers' Championship ===
2003 British Superbike Privateers' Championship
Pos	Rider	Bike	SIL (England)		SNE (England)		THR (England)		OUL (England)		KNO (Scotland)		BRH (England)		ROC (England)		MON (Republic of Ireland)		OUL (England)		CAD (England)		BRH (England)		DON (England)		Pts
Pos	Rider	Bike	R1	R2	R1	R2	R1	R2	R1	R2	R1	R2	R1	R2	R1	R2	R1	R2	R1	R2	R1	R2	R1	R2	R1	R2	Pts
1	(England) Dave Wood	Suzuki							2	1	5	1	Ret	1	2	2	3	2	1	1	7	3	3	1	2	8	326
2	(England) Dennis Hobbs	Suzuki									1	2	1	2	1	1	1	Ret	2	2	1	1	Ret	DNS	1	1	305
3	(England) Sam Corke	Suzuki			Ret	DNS			4	4	3	Ret	Ret	6	4	4	6	3	3	3	5	8	1	2	3	4	229
4	(England) Jeremy Goodall	Yamaha							3	3	Ret	3	3	4	3	3			4	5	2	2	2	Ret	DNS	DNS	193
5	(England) Francis Williamson	Yamaha					15	14	1	2	2	4	2	3	DNS	DNS	7	Ret	Ret	Ret	10	6	Ret	3	Ret	Ret	155
6	(England) James Buckingham	Suzuki											7	10	7	6	5	5	5	4	4	7	6	5	4	3	152
7	(England) Mike Walker	Yamaha			13	15	16	16	5	5	Ret	DNS	Ret	DNS	6	8	11	9	7	6	8	Ret	7	7	8	7	114
8	(England) Malcolm Ashley	Ducati								4	Ret	Ret	26	11	8	7			8	10	9	9	9	8	6	9	95
9	(England) Phil Giles	Suzuki																	Ret	DNS	3	4	4	4	Ret	2	75
10	(England) Gordon Blackley	Honda							Ret	6	6	Ret	5	5	Ret	Ret					6	Ret	Ret	DNS	7	6	71
10	(England) Howie Mainwaring	Yamaha							6	Ret	Ret	5	8	9	Ret	9	Ret	10	9	7	Ret	DNS			Ret	10	71
12	(Australia) Nigel Arnold	Suzuki											9	12	5	5	4	Ret	Ret	DNS							46
13	(Republic of Ireland) Hilton Hincks	Honda															2	1									45
14	(England) Alan Moreton	Yamaha							7	7					Ret	11	32	Ret			11	11	Ret	Ret	10	12	43
15	(England) Jason Davis	Honda															DNS	11	6	Ret			8	6	DNS	Ret	33
16	(England) Ben Mossey	Suzuki											6	7											9	11	31
17	(England) Adam Hitchcox	Suzuki											6	7					Ret	Ret	Ret	10			Ret	13	30
18	(England) John Nisill	Suzuki											Ret	Ret	10	10	33	15	10	9	WD						26
19	(England) Darren Thomas	Suzuki													9	12	30	12	Ret	8					WD		23
20	(England) Vince Whittle	Ducati																							5	5	22
21	(England) Stephen Thompson	Suzuki															8	4									21
22	(England) Denver Robb	Suzuki															10	7			12	Ret					19
23	(Republic of Ireland) Jonathan Ralph	Suzuki															9	6									17
24	(Republic of Ireland) Jamie Patterson	Suzuki															12	8									12
25	(England) Mark Burr	Suzuki																			Ret	5					11
25	(England) Ben Wilson	Suzuki																			Ret	Ret	5	Ret			11
27	(Republic of Ireland) Peraic Dooley	Suzuki															13	Ret									3
27	(England) Ian McCallister	Yamaha															Ret	13									3
29	(England) Derek Wilson	Suzuki															14	Ret									2
29	(England) Rob Butterworth	Suzuki															31	14									2
31	(Republic of Ireland) Matt Niland	Suzuki															15	Ret									2
	(England) Mark Buckley	Suzuki																	Ret	DNS							0
	(England) Warren Scott	Suzuki																			WD						0
	(England) Chris Heath	Suzuki																	Ret	DNS	WD						0
	(England) Neil Cray	Suzuki			Ret	Ret	18	DNS																			0
Pos	Rider	Bike	SIL (England)		SNE (England)		THR (England)		OUL (England)		KNO (Scotland)		BRH (England)		ROC (England)		MON (Republic of Ireland)		OUL (England)		CAD (England)		BRH (England)		DON (England)		Pts

Colour	Result
Gold	Winner
Silver	Second place
Bronze	Third place
Green	Points classification
Blue	Non-points classification
Blue	Non-classified finish (NC)
Purple	Retired, not classified (Ret)
Red	Did not qualify (DNQ)
Red	Did not pre-qualify (DNPQ)
Black	Disqualified (DSQ)
White	Did not start (DNS)
White	Withdrew (WD)
White	Race cancelled (C)
Blank	Did not practice (DNP)
Blank	Did not arrive (DNA)
Blank	Excluded (EX)

=== Teams' Championship ===
2003 Teams' Championship
Pos	Team	Bike	SIL (England)			SNE (England)			THR (England)			OUL (England)			KNO (Scotland)			BRH (England)			ROC (England)			MON (Republic of Ireland)			OUL (England)			CAD (England)			BRH (England)			DON (England)			Pts
Pos	Team	Bike	Q	R1	R2	Q	R1	R2	Q	R1	R2	Q	R1	R2	Q	R1	R2	Q	R1	R2	Q	R1	R2	Q	R1	R2	Q	R1	R2	Q	R1	R2	Q	R1	R2	Q	R1	R2	Pts
1	(England) MonsterMob Ducati; ETI Racing	Ducati	58	53	58	59	58	59	51	55	52	57	59	55	48	57	48	51	57	53		57	56	59	55	56	58	46	59	57	58	56	61	61	62	63	63	62	1977
2	(England) Team Renegade Ducati	Ducati	50	47	52	61	49	48	53	57	57	52	46	45	54	47	43	59	35	59		54	54	50	51	54	56	54	53	55	51	47	60	53	52	58	55	57	1828
3	(England) Rizla Suzuki	Suzuki	51	31	29	50	49	58	45	45	40	58	53	60	49	54	57	58	53	55		60	60	53	62	50	61	49	63	57	31	31	54	49	50	54	50	53	1782
4	(England) Hawk Kawasaki	Kawasaki	50	57	56	48	52	39	51	49	52	39	45	45	53	49	52	53	53	52		51	45	61	54	50	45	55	48	51	55	46	51	53	54	49	55	47	1765
5	(England) Virgin Mobile Yamaha	Yamaha	55	53	53	47	41	44	58	57	55	54	56	52	51	47	55	52	57	53		43	48	29	26	29	46	40	37	48	48	53	45	50	47	41	43	45	1658
6	(England) Honda Racing UK	Honda	25	20	23	47	47	51	51	53	54	47	52	43	25	29	30	24	30	25		47	52	45	49	51	50	58	52	29	20	32	44	48	50	43	22	24	1392
7	(England) Hawk Racing; TCD Suzuki	Kawasaki; Suzuki	37	46	43	32	42	40	41	40	39	36	37	39	36	43	41	37	43	39		40	39	36	39	40	35	37	37	35	48	44	33	38	33	34	38	41	1358
8	(England) Appleyard Yamaha	Yamaha	43	42	42	37	49	46	34	35	34	35	41	39	57	48	45	40	41	19		40	38	41	39	45	35	40	21	19	22	22	38	37	40	24	23	25	1276
9	(England) D&B Racing; Renegade Racing	Ducati	39	26	19	42	36	38	39	32	40	45	34	45	35	34	37	18	23	20		16	16	18	17		37	44	22	41	42	44	37	34	35	42	43	21	1111
Pos	Team	Bike	SIL (England)			SNE (England)			THR (England)			OUL (England)			KNO (Scotland)			BRH (England)			ROC (England)			MON (Republic of Ireland)			OUL (England)			CAD (England)			BRH (England)			DON (England)			Pts

Colour	Result
Gold	Winner
Silver	Second place
Bronze	Third place
Green	Points classification
Blue	Non-points classification
Blue	Non-classified finish (NC)
Purple	Retired, not classified (Ret)
Red	Did not qualify (DNQ)
Red	Did not pre-qualify (DNPQ)
Black	Disqualified (DSQ)
White	Did not start (DNS)
White	Withdrew (WD)
White	Race cancelled (C)
Blank	Did not practice (DNP)
Blank	Did not arrive (DNA)
Blank	Excluded (EX)

=== Manufacturers' Championship ===
2003 British Superbike Manufacturers' Championship
Pos	Manufacturer	Bike	SIL (England)		SNE (England)		THR (England)		OUL (England)		KNO (Scotland)		BRH (England)		ROC (England)		MON (Republic of Ireland)		OUL (England)		CAD (England)		BRH (England)		DON (England)		Pts
Pos	Manufacturer	Bike	R1	R2	R1	R2	R1	R2	R1	R2	R1	R2	R1	R2	R1	R2	R1	R2	R1	R2	R1	R2	R1	R2	R1	R2	Pts
1	(Italy) Ducati	Ducati	1	1	1	1	1	1	1	1	1	1	1	2	2	2	2	2	3	3	1	3	2	1	1	1	543
2	(Japan) Suzuki	Suzuki	2	4	3	3	9	9	5	2	3	2	2	1	1	1	1	1	2	1	2	2	1	2	3	2	457
3	(Japan) Kawasaki	Kawasaki	3	3	5	10	4	3	9	9	6	4	6	5	6	6	4	3	5	8	5	6	5	4	5	6	271
4	(Japan) Honda	Honda	Ret	10	4	7	5	4	4	6	4	3	3	8	3	4	6	6	1	5	Ret	1	7	6	11	9	269
5	(Japan) Yamaha	Yamaha	5	5	7	4	2	5	3	5	2	5	4	6	10	7	7	4	10	12	4	5	6	7	8	7	263
Pos	Manufacturer	Bike	SIL (England)		SNE (England)		THR (England)		OUL (England)		KNO (Scotland)		BRH (England)		ROC (England)		MON (Republic of Ireland)		OUL (England)		CAD (England)		BRH (England)		DON (England)		Pts

Colour	Result
Gold	Winner
Silver	Second place
Bronze	Third place
Green	Points classification
Blue	Non-points classification
Blue	Non-classified finish (NC)
Purple	Retired, not classified (Ret)
Red	Did not qualify (DNQ)
Red	Did not pre-qualify (DNPQ)
Black	Disqualified (DSQ)
White	Did not start (DNS)
White	Withdrew (WD)
White	Race cancelled (C)
Blank	Did not practice (DNP)
Blank	Did not arrive (DNA)
Blank	Excluded (EX)
