= Shane Byrne (motorcyclist) =

British motorcycle racer

Shane 'Shakey' Byrne
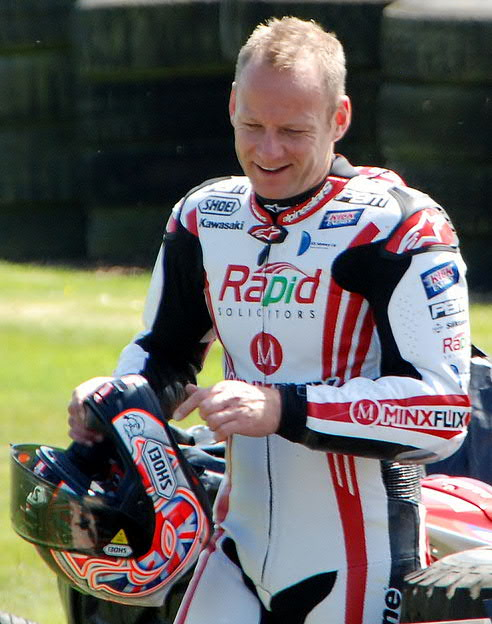
- Byrne at Oulton Park British Superbikes in 2013
- Nationality: British
- Born: 10 December 1976 (age 49); Lambeth, London
- Bike number: 67
- Website: shakey.com
Motorcycle racing career statistics
MotoGP World Championship
Active years	2004-2005
Manufacturers	Aprilia, Proton-KTM, Honda
Starts / Wins / Podiums / Poles / F. laps / Points; 20 / 0 / 0 / 0 / 0 / 24
Superbike World Championship
Active years	2002–2003, 2009–2010
Manufacturers	Ducati
Championships	0
2010 championship position	10th (169 pts) BSB
Starts / Wins / Podiums / Poles / F. laps / Points; 54 / 2 / 3 / 0 / 1 / 395
British Superbike Championship
Active years	1999–2003,2006–2008,2011–present
Championships	6 (2003, 2008, 2012, 2014, 2016, 2017)
2016 championship position	1st (669 pts)
Starts / Wins / Podiums / Poles / F. laps / Points; 356 / 85 / 187 / 0 / 0 / 0

Shane Daniel Byrne (born 10 December 1976), often known as Shakey, is a British professional motorcycle road racer. He is a six-time champion of the British Superbike Championship (2003, 2008, 2012, 2014, 2016 and 2017), the only man in the history of the series to win six titles. He has also been a double race winner in the Superbike World Championship and has competed in MotoGP.

The oldest rider competing in the 2018 British Superbike series, Byrne suffered serious injuries involving multiple fractures to his upper body after crashing during a test at Snetterton Circuit in May when placed third in the championship. He was successfully treated at Norwich University Hospital and confirmed the extent of his injuries via social media.

Byrne announced via social media on 24 July 2018 that the metal cage attached to his skull supporting his head and neck via his shoulders had been removed in favour of a neck-brace collar, but there was still many more months of recovery anticipated due to poor growth of new bone.

Since medically retiring from competitive racing in 2019, Byrne successfully transitioned into a respected motorcycle race commentator for Eurosport/ TNT. Byrne is also manager and mentor to racers Bradley Ray and Rhys Irwin.

== Early Days ==
Prior to motorcycle racing, Byrne was a London Underground worker. While working as a road tester for Fast Bikes magazine, he participated in track days on a Ducati 996 SPS at a wet Oulton Park. He caught the attention of Paul Bird, his future boss.

Byrne emerged in the British Superbike Championship in 1999, initially on a private Kawasaki. In 2001, he finished eighth in the championship on board the Performance House Suzuki, which had been previously raced in the 1997 World Superbike Championship, under the Harris brothers' business, Harris Performance. Byrne had five top-five finishes in the 2001 season and was champion of the Privateers' Cup; he was the privateer winner in 22 races out of 26.

== Early success ==
In 2002, Byrne was signed by Mark Griffiths at Renegade Ducati to ride alongside Michael Rutter. He also achieved his first British Superbike Championship win in the first race of round three at Donington Park after a race-long battle with Steve Plater on the Virgin Yamaha. At the end of 2002, he joined Paul Bird at MonsterMob Ducati, controversially replacing reigning champion Steve Hislop. He stunned the paddock by storming to a string of wins, taking the title with ease. He impressed further by achieving a double win at Brands Hatch for the British round of the Superbike World Championship.

== MotoGP ==
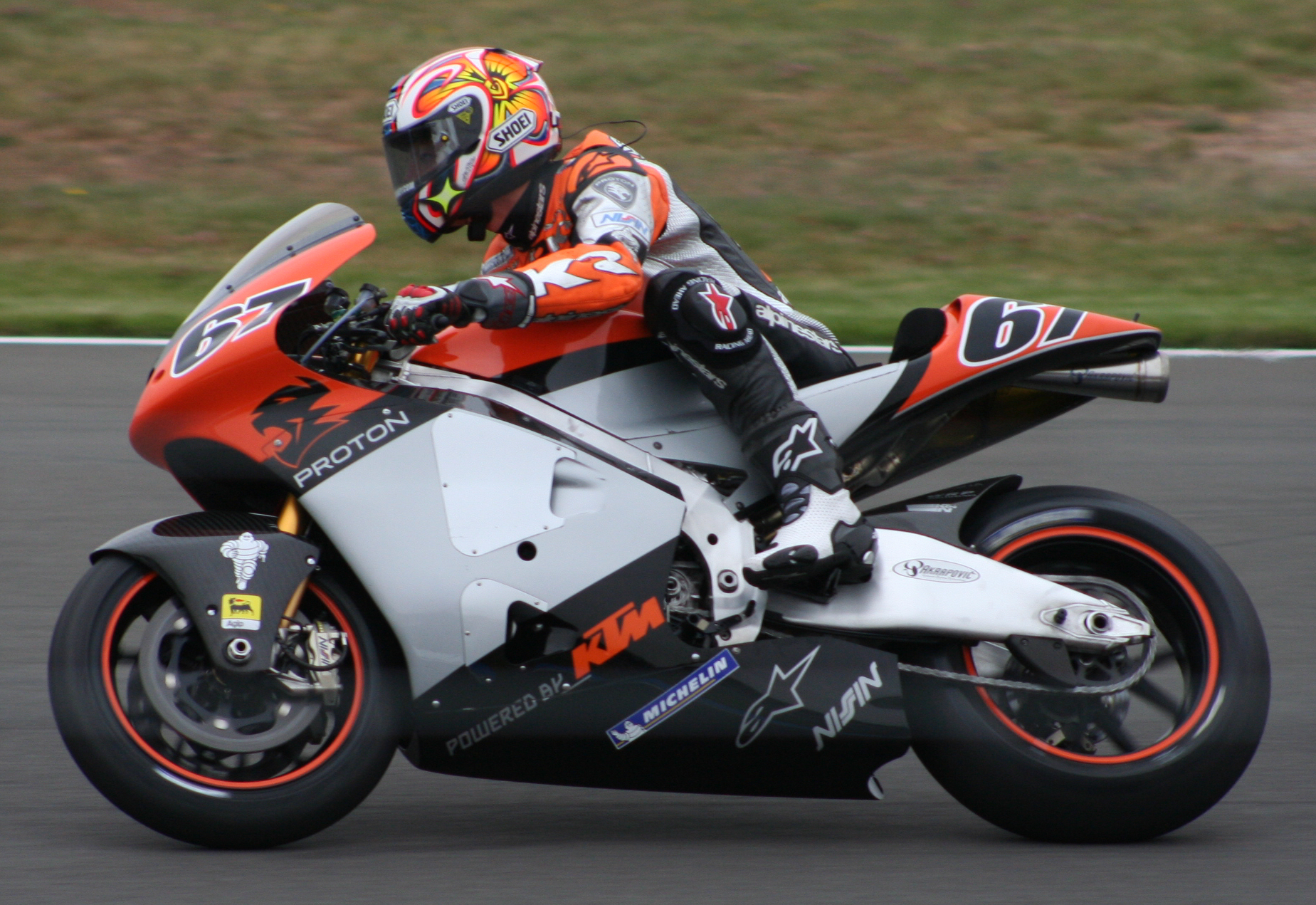
Byrne riding a Proton KTM at the 2005 British Grand Prix

For 2004, Byrne joined fellow Brit Jeremy McWilliams in MotoGP with Aprilia, although he missed several races because of injury. He spent much of 2005 racing for Kenny Roberts' team on a KTM bike, before they were forced to pull out due to an internal dispute between the chassis and engine manufacturers. He raced in Malaysia and Qatar for Camel Honda, replacing the injured Troy Bayliss. But after finishing 14th and 13th, Byrne did not impress Honda and was replaced by Chris Vermeulen.

== Back to Britain 1 ==
For 2006, Byrne returned to the British Superbike Championship with Rizla Suzuki squad. His first podium came in Race Seven despite suffering a severe stomach virus that weekend. He missed Races 11 and 12 after a 187 mph crash caused by a brake failure; he was not seriously injured. At Knockhill, he qualified second and followed with a second-place finish in Race One. The team's first win of the season came in Race Two. This was despite the team's bikes having been stolen and dumped in a barn alongside horse manure the previous week. At the final round of the season, he was running third when he highsided, being knocked out in the process. Although he again escaped serious injury, he was unable to compete in the final race of the year, which meant he slipped from fourth to sixth in the championship standings.

For 2007, Byrne was reunited with his former Monstermob boss, Paul Bird, who was now running the Stobart Vent-Axia team, a privateer team using the 1000cc Honda Fireblade. The Honda was competitive from the start, giving Byrne more opportunities to fight at the front. He finished fifth overall, with a win, a pole position, and nine further podiums.

For the 2008 British Superbike Championship, Byrne competed for the Airwaves Ducati squad on a Ducati 1098 alongside Leon Camier. The combo was immediately dominant. Byrne won three of the opening four races. In the second race at Oulton Park, he went wide on Lap One, dropping to 13th place, but he fought back. Almost immediately after he passed Cal Crutchlow for third place, Leon Haslam hit Tom Sykes, giving Byrne the lead. This race was stopped four laps early after several riders, including Crutchlow and Karl Harris fell. In Race Two at Snetterton, he was held up by a crash involving Harris on Lap One, dropping to 13th position before fighting back for the win. He finished each of the first 14 races on the podium, often coming through the field after poor starts.

== World Superbikes ==
Twenty-four hours after clinching the British Superbike Championship, Byrne confirmed that he would compete in the 2009 World Superbike Championship with the Sterilgarda Ducati team along with Alex Polita. This was his first full-time World Superbike Championship, although he has made successful wild card appearances in the past. Byrne became Sterilgarda Ducati's sole rider in February (due to apparent financial problems forcing Polita out) and recorded his first podium with the team in second place in the first race at the San Marino round of the Championship.

Due to financial problems, the Sterilgarda team failed to announce its intention to compete in the 2010 Superbike World Championship season, leaving Byrne without a confirmed ride for 2010. In November 2009, Byrne announced that he had signed with the Althea Racing team for the 2010 season. He raced alongside former Honda rider Carlos Checa. He was well behind Checa in performance and had no top-five finishes by midseason. He said he was "bitterly disappointed" with the season as a whole.

== Back to Britain 2 ==
Byrne returned to the British Superbike Championship in 2011 with Lincolnshire-based HM Plant Honda alongside Japanese rider and three-time British Superbike Champion Ryuichi Kiyonari.

In 2012, Byrne made a return to Paul Bird Motorsport along with Stuart Easton.

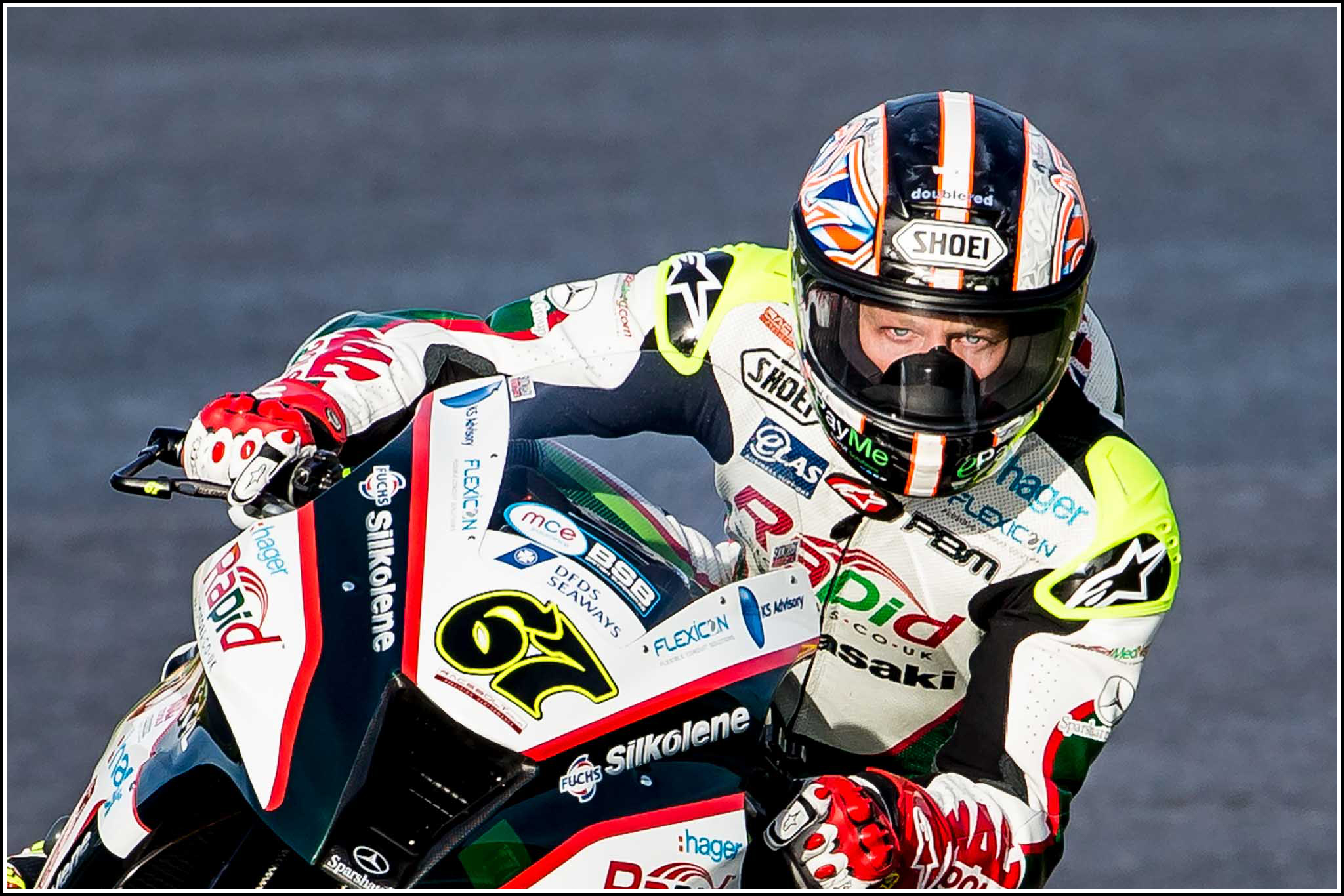
Byrne at Brands Hatch during Round 12 of the 2014 British Superbike Championship

In 2016, the Paul Bird Motorsport team switched from Kawasaki machinery to Ducati. Byrne competed in British Superbike Championship on a fully factory supported Ducati Panigale R sponsored by Be Wiser Insurance.

== After racing ==
After a serious injury ended his immediate participation in motorcycle sport, Byrne started to work as a race-weekend commentator.

In a 2021 interview, Byrne confirmed he had not made any firm decision not to again participate, and that his confidence in his long-term recovery had been impacted by the UK's emergency reaction to COVID-19 where hospital specialists were redeployed into other areas of need, hence he was 'on hold' until further treatment was available.

Byrne has established a partnership and new sports management consultancy business with fellow television presenter Matt Roberts to mentor and progress young motorcycle racers. Matt Roberts co-wrote Byrne's book released in 2020 entitled Unshakeable.

In February 2022, it was announced that Byrne would be appearing in future episodes of The Late Brake Show, a YouTube Channel hosted by Jonny Smith. Byrne will be a guest presenter to ride and review motorcycles, with the first episode eponymously entitled 'Byrne Out'.

Byrne also hosts a podcast with tv personality and Baker, Paul Hollywood, under their combined Hollywood and Byrne brand, around their shared love and passion for all things Motorsport.

Byrne is manager and mentor to superbike racer Bradley Ray, who won the 2022 BSB Championship and is contracted to ride in European rounds of World Superbikes for 2023.

== Torrens Trophy ==
Bryne was awarded the prestigious Torrens Trophy in 2014 in recognition of his winning multiple British Superbike Championships.

== Personal life ==
Born in Lambeth, London. Byrne was adopted as a baby and moved to Sittingbourne in Kent with his adoptive parents. Still a keen and competitive sportsman, Byrne cycles, plays golf and continues to ride motorcycles off track. In addition, Byrne quietly spends considerable time on charitable enterprises, including completing the London Marathon in 2026, raising funds for Spinal Research. Byrne divorced his first wife in 2025. He continues to live in Kent with his partner, Gilly. Byrne has two children.

== Career statistics ==
Stats correct as of 19 October 2014

=== By championship ===
==== British Superbike Championship ====
(key) (Races in bold indicate pole position; races in italics indicate fastest lap)

Year	Class	Bike	1		2		3		4		5		6		7		8		9		10		11		12		13		Pos	Pts
Year	Class	Bike	R1	R2	R1	R2	R1	R2	R1	R2	R1	R2	R1	R2	R1	R2	R1	R2	R1	R2	R1	R2	R1	R2	R1	R2	R1	R2	Pos	Pts
2001	BSB	Suzuki	DON; 7	DON; 8	SIL; 9	SIL; 9	SNE; 6	SNE; 6	OUL; 4	OUL; 8	BRH; 5	BRH; 4	THR; 8	THR; 5	OUL; Ret	OUL; 8	KNO; 8	KNO; 6	CAD; 7	CAD; Ret	BRH; 8	BRH; 8	MAL; Ret	MAL; 7	ROC; Ret	ROC; 5	DON; 7	DON; 7	8th	204

Year	Make	1		2		3			4		5		6			7			8			9			10		11		12			13		Pos	Pts	Ref
Year	Make	R1	R2	R1	R2	R1	R2	R3	R1	R2	R1	R2	R1	R2	R3	R1	R2	R3	R1	R2	R3	R1	R2	R3	R1	R2	R1	R2	R1	R2	R3	R1	R2	Pos	Pts	Ref
2006	Suzuki	**BHI**; 6	**BHI**; 11	**DON**; 5	**DON**; NC	**THR**; 5	**THR**; 8		**OUL**; 2	**OUL**; 3	**MON**; C	**MON**; C	**MAL**; 4	**MAL**; 5		**SNE**	**SNE**		**KNO**; 2	**KNO**; 1		**OUL**; 4	**OUL**; 5		**CRO**; 5	**CRO**; 4	**CAD**; 4	**CAD**; Ret	**SIL**; Ret	**SIL**; 4		**BHGP**; Ret	**BHGP**; DNS	6th	224	
2007	Honda	**BHGP**; 4	**BHGP**; 13	**THR**; 4	**THR**; 3	**SIL**; Ret	**SIL**; Ret		**OUL**; 6	**OUL**; 3	**SNE**; Ret	**SNE**; 3	**MON**; 2	**MON**; 2		**KNO**; 4	**KNO**; 5		**OUL**; 2	**OUL**; 3		**MAL**; 1	**MAL**; 3		**CRO**; 9	**CRO**; 7	**CAD**; 4	**CAD**; Ret	**DON**; 3	**DON**; 6		**BHI**; 6	**BHI**; Ret	5th	293	
2008	Ducati	**BHGP**; C	**BHGP**; C	**THR**; 1	**THR**; 2	**OUL**; 1	**OUL**; 1		**BHGP**; 1	**BHGP**; 2	**DON**; 1	**DON**; 1	**SNE**; 2	**SNE**; 1		**MAL**; 1	**MAL**; 2		**OUL**; 3	**OUL**; 3		**KNO**; 2	**KNO**; Ret		**CAD**; 3	**CAD**; 3	**CRO**; 5	**CRO**; 4	**SIL**; 3	**SIL**; 2		**BHI**; 1	**BHI**; 1	**1st**	**474**	
2011	Honda	**BHI**; 1	**BHI**; 3	**OUL**; 6	**OUL**; 3	**CRO**; Ret	**CRO**; 1		**THR**; 3	**THR**; 1	**KNO**; 3	**KNO**; 2	**SNE**; 3	**SNE**; 4		**OUL**; 4	**OUL**; C		**BHGP**; 16	**BHGP**; 1	**BHGP**; 3	**CAD**; 3	**CAD**; 3	**CAD**; 4	**DON**; 4	**DON**; 8	**SIL**; 5	**SIL**; 5	**BHGP**; 6	**BHGP**; 1	**BHGP**; 1			**3rd**	**625**	
2012	Kawasaki	**BHI**; 7	**BHI**; C	**THR**; 4	**THR**; 3	**OUL**; 11	**OUL**; 2	**OUL**; 1	**SNE**; Ret	**SNE**; 2	**KNO**; 1	**KNO**; 2	**OUL**; 3	**OUL**; 3	**OUL**; 2	**BHGP**; 1	**BHGP**; 1		**CAD**; DNS	**CAD**; DNS		**DON**	**DON**		**ASS**; 1	**ASS**; 2	**SIL**; 2	**SIL**; 2	**BHGP**; 1	**BHGP**; 1	**BHGP**; 1			**1st**	**683**	
2013	Kawasaki	**BHI**; 1	**BHI**; 3	**THR**; 1	**THR**; 1	**OUL**; Ret	**OUL**; 1		**KNO**; 1	**KNO**; 1	**SNE**; 3	**SNE**; 1	**BHGP**; Ret	**BHGP**; 1		**OUL**; 2	**OUL**; 1	**OUL**; 2	**CAD**; 2	**CAD**; 4		**DON**; 2	**DON**; 2		**ASS**; 2	**ASS**; Ret	**SIL**; 2	**SIL**; 1	**BHGP**; 3	**BHGP**; Ret	**BHGP**; 3			**2nd**	**636**	
2014	Kawasaki	**BHI**; 1	**BHI**; 1	**OUL**; 1	**OUL**; 2	**SNE**; 1	**SNE**; 1		**KNO**; 2	**KNO**; 1	**BHGP**; 2	**BHGP**; 5	**THR**; 2	**THR**; 2		**OUL**; 3	**OUL**; 3	**OUL**; 2	**CAD**; 2	**CAD**; 2		**DON**; 2	**DON**; 2		**ASS**; Ret	**ASS**; 1	**SIL**; 1	**SIL**; 2	**BHGP**; Ret	**BHGP**; 1	**BHGP**; 1			**1st**	**682**^{3}	
2015	Kawasaki	**DON**; 2	**DON**; 1	**BHI**; 2	**BHI**; 2	**OUL**; 3	**OUL**; Ret		**SNE**; 1	**SNE**; 1	**KNO**; 1	**KNO**; 1	**BHGP**; Ret	**BHGP**; 2		**THR**; 4	**THR**; 2		**CAD**; 6	**CAD**; 4		**OUL**; 1	**OUL**; Ret	**OUL**; 1	**ASS**; 4	**ASS**; 5	**SIL**; 2	**SIL**; 5	**BHGP**; 2	**BHGP**; 2	**BHGP**; 3			**2nd**	**662**^{3}	
2016	Ducati	**SIL**; 2	**SIL**; 2	**OUL**; 8	**OUL**; 6	**BHI**; 9	**BHI**; 1		**KNO**; Ret	**KNO**; 1	**SNE**; 3	**SNE**; 1	**THR**; 1	**THR**; Ret		**BHGP**; 1	**BHGP**; 1		**CAD**; 1	**CAD**; 3		**OUL**; 9	**OUL**; Ret	**OUL**; 5	**DON**; 1	**DON**; 1	**ASS**; 2	**ASS**; 2	**BHGP**; 6	**BHGP**; 6	**BHGP**; 3			**1st**	**669**	
2017	Ducati	**DON**; DNS	**DON**; DNS	**BHI**; 4	**BHI**; Ret	**OUL**; 2	**OUL**; 1		**KNO**; 3	**KNO**; 3	**SNE**; 1	**SNE**; 1	**BHGP**; 1	**BHGP**; 1		**THR**; 4	**THR**; Ret		**CAD**; 3	**CAD**; Ret		**SIL**; Ret	**SIL**; 3	**SIL**; Ret	**OUL**; 9	**OUL**; 7	**ASS**; 2	**ASS**; 5	**BHGP**; 1	**BHGP**; 1	**BHGP**; 8			**1st**	**637**	
2018	Ducati	**DON**; 2	**DON**; 5	**BHI**; 1	**BHI**; 4	**OUL**; 3	**OUL**; 4		**SNE**; DNS	**SNE**; DNS																								15th	98	

- * Season still in progress

===== Notes =====
1.2011/2012 - Byrne qualified for "The Showdown" part of the British Superbike Championship season, thus before the 11th round he was awarded 500 points, plus the podium credits he had gained throughout the season. Podium credits are given to any rider finishing first, second, or third with three, two, and one points awarded respectively.
2.2013 - Byrne qualified for "The Showdown" part of the British Superbike Championship season, thus before the tenth round he was awarded 500 points, plus the podium credits he had gained throughout the season. Podium credits are given to anyone finishing first, second, or third with three, two, and one points awarded respectively.
3.2014/2015 - Byrne qualified for "The Showdown" part of the British Superbike Championship season, thus before the tenth round he was awarded 500 points, plus the podium credits he had gained throughout the season. Podium credits are given to anyone finishing first, second, or third, with five, three, and one points awarded respectively.

==== Superbike World Championship ====
Year	Class	Bike	ESP (Spain)		AUS (Australia)		JPN (Japan)		ITA (Italy)		GER (Germany)		GBR (United Kingdom)		SMR (San Marino)		USA (United States)		GBR (United Kingdom)		NED (Netherlands)		ITA (Italy)		FRA (France)		Pos	Pts	Ref
Year	Class	Bike	R1	R2	R1	R2	R1	R2	R1	R2	R1	R2	R1	R2	R1	R2	R1	R2	R1	R2	R1	R2	R1	R2	R1	R2	Pos	Pts	Ref
2003	SBK	Ducati																	1	1							16th	50	

Year	Class	Bike	AUS (Australia)		QAT (Qatar)		SPA (Spain)		NED (Netherlands)		ITA (Italy)		RSA (South Africa)		USA (United States)		SMR (San Marino)		GBR (United Kingdom)		CZE (Czech Republic)		GER (Germany)		ITA (Italy)		FRA (France)		POR (Portugal)		Pos	Pts	Ref
Year	Class	Bike	R1	R2	R1	R2	R1	R2	R1	R2	R1	R2	R1	R2	R1	R2	R1	R2	R1	R2	R1	R2	R1	R2	R1	R2	R1	R2	R1	R2	Pos	Pts	Ref
2009	SBK	Ducati	Ret	Ret	6	12	9	11	11	8	14	18	9	Ret	11	10	2	6	5	4	4	8	10	Ret	Ret	7	8	7	4	4	8th	192	

Year	Class	Bike	AUS (Australia)		POR (Portugal)		SPA (Spain)		NED (Netherlands)		ITA (Italy)		RSA (South Africa)		USA (United States)		SMR (San Marino)		CZE (Czech Republic)		GBR (United Kingdom)		GER (Germany)		ITA (Italy)		FRA (France)		Pos	Pts	Ref
Year	Class	Bike	R1	R2	R1	R2	R1	R2	R1	R2	R1	R2	R1	R2	R1	R2	R1	R2	R1	R2	R1	R2	R1	R2	R1	R2	R1	R2	Pos	Pts	Ref
2010	SBK	Ducati	14	12	6	7	Ret	8	9	8	13	9	15	13	6	7	9	7	12	9	9	8	9	10	8	6	9	8	10th	169	

==== Grand Prix motorcycle racing ====
(key) (Races in bold indicate pole position)

Year	Class	Bike	1	2	3	4	5	6	7	8	9	10	11	12	13	14	15	16	17	Pos	Pts
2004	MotoGP	Aprilia	RSA; 15	SPA; Ret	FRA; DNS	ITA; 10	CAT; 13	NED; Ret	BRA; 17	GER; 14	GBR; 13	CZE; DNS	POR	JPN; 13	QAT	MAL	AUS	VAL		20th	18
2005	MotoGP	Proton KR/Honda	SPA; Ret	POR; 16	CHN	FRA; Ret	ITA; 16	CAT; 16	NED; 17	USA; 15	GBR; Ret	GER; Ret	CZE	JPN	MAL; 14	QAT; 13	AUS	TUR	VAL	24th	6

== See also ==
- 2006 British Superbike season
- 2008 British Superbike season
- 2009 Superbike World Championship season

== Bibliography ==
- Byrne, Shane (20 August 2020). Unshakeable: My Motorcycle Racing Story. Pan Macmillan. ISBN 978-1529034325.
