= Scott Smart =

British motorcycle racer

- Born: 29 May 1975 (age 51); Maidstone, Kent
- Father: Paul Smart
- Relatives: Barry Sheene (uncle)

Scott Paul Smart (born 29 May 1975) is a British motorcycle racer and an occasional TV commentator for Channel 4. He is the son of Paul Smart, and the nephew of Barry Sheene.

== Racing career ==
Scott Paul Smart won the Superteen series in 1994, and he was 1997 250cc British Champion, having previously finished as series runner-up, before making a move up to the 500cc World Championship the next year. He was not successful here, and after some 250cc races a year later he spent several years in British Supersport, finishing as runner-up in 2002.

=== British Superbikes ===
Smart did his first full season in British Superbike in 2003 for Hawk Kawasaki, finishing ninth overall, with a string of top-ten finishes as well as twice qualifying on the front row. He then took three wins to finish fourth in 2004. This earned him a prestigious ride with Rizla Suzuki alongside reigning champion John Reynolds for 2005, but he struggled on the bike and left the team mid-season, joining the small Vivaldi racing team, but missing some races with a broken collarbone. He started 2006 with a bang, winning a chaotic wet round 3 at Donington Park, but has not been among the front-runners in the dry on his semi-works Suzuki. Late in the season, he sustained a broken wrist and did a technical piece about engine specifications whilst still in plaster. Confusingly, this was broadcast hours after he had raced in the BSB season finale, finishing sixth in race one. For 2007, he returned to Hawk Kawasaki, but had an uncompetitive start to the season.

=== British Superstock 1000 ===
Smart moved down to the stock class in 2009 with the Moto Rapido Ducati team, he was pencilled in to move back to the British Superbike Championship class in 2010 under the Evo regulations, however after one of their sponsors dropped out Smart stayed in the stock class for 2010.

== Radio Control ==
Smart is also very active in Radio Controlled models, mainly touring cars and 1/12 Pan/Le Mans. He has raced at British National level and has even represented the BRCA at the 1/12 European Championships.

During his spare time, Scott is a contributor to the UK RC Car magazine Radio Controlled Car Racer.

== Career statistics ==
Stats correct as of 9 July 2012

=== By championship ===
==== British Superbike Championship ====
Year	Class	Bike	1		2		3		4		5		6		7		8		9		10		11		12		13		Pos	Pts
Year	Class	Bike	R1	R2	R1	R2	R1	R2	R1	R2	R1	R2	R1	R2	R1	R2	R1	R2	R1	R2	R1	R2	R1	R2	R1	R2	R1	R2	Pos	Pts
2004	BSB	Kawasaki	SIL; 7	SIL; 5	BHI; 4	BHI; 4	SNE; 5	SNE; 6	OUL; 5	OUL; 5	MON; 1	MON; 3	THR; 6	THR; 4	BHGP; Ret	BHGP; 5	KNO; 1	KNO; 6	MAL; 3	MAL; 1	CRO; 3	CRO; 2	CAD; 20	CAD; 2	OUL; 8	OUL; Ret	DON; 4	DON; 4	4th	330
2006	BSB	Kawasaki	BHI; 14	BHI; 16	DON; 10	DON; 1	THR; 11	THR; 10	OUL; 13	OUL; 13	MON; C	MON; C	MAL; 17	MAL; 16	SNE; Ret	SNE; 7	KNO; 10	KNO; 7	OUL; 8	OUL; Ret	CRO	CRO	CAD	CAD	SIL	SIL	BHGP; 6	BHGP; Ret	14th	92

Year	Class	Make	1		2		3			4		5		6			7		8			9			10		11		12			Pos	Pts	Ref
Year	Class	Make	R1	R2	R1	R2	R1	R2	R3	R1	R2	R1	R2	R1	R2	R3	R1	R2	R1	R2	R3	R1	R2	R3	R1	R2	R1	R2	R1	R2	R3	Pos	Pts	Ref
2008	BSB	Honda	THR; 16	THR; 12	OUL; 11	OUL; 8	BHGP; 11	BHGP; 10		DON; 15	DON; 12	SNE; Ret	SNE; Ret	MAL; Ret	MAL; 10	OUL; 11	OUL; 8		KNO; Ret	KNO; 13		CAD; 13	CAD; 8		CRO; 13	CRO; Ret	SIL; Ret	SIL; Ret	BHI; 21	BHI; 20		14th	69	
2011	BSB	Ducati	BHI; 24	BHI; 20	OUL; 17	OUL; 17	CRO; 22	CRO; Ret		THR; Ret	THR; DNS	KNO; 16	KNO; 14	SNE; Ret	SNE; DNS		OUL; 10	OUL; C	BHGP; 26	BHGP; 18	BHGP; 20	CAD; 14	CAD; 12	CAD; 13	DON; Ret	DON; DNS	SIL; 16	SIL; Ret	BHGP; Ret	BHGP; 13	BHGP; 15	23rd	21	
2011	E^{1}	Ducati	BHI; 24	BHI; 20	OUL; 17	OUL; 17	CRO; 22	CRO; Ret		THR; Ret	THR; DNS	KNO; 16	KNO; 14	SNE; Ret	SNE; DNS		OUL; 10	OUL; C	BHGP; 26	BHGP; 18	BHGP; 20	CAD; 14	CAD; 12	CAD; 13	DON; Ret	DON; DNS	SIL; 16	SIL; Ret	BHGP; Ret	BHGP; 13	BHGP; 15	5th	257	
2012	BSB	Ducati	BHI; 14	BHI; C	THR; 18	THR; 22	OUL; 19	OUL; Ret	OUL; DNS	SNE; Ret	SNE; 15	KNO; Ret	KNO; 16	OUL; 13	OUL; 15	OUL; 15	BHGP	BHGP	CAD	CAD		DON	DON		ASS	ASS	SIL	SIL	BHGP	BHGP	BHGP	24th*	8*	

Year	Make	1			2			3			4			5			6			7			8			9			10			11			12			Pos	Pts
Year	Make	R1	R2	R3	R1	R2	R3	R1	R2	R3	R1	R2	R3	R1	R2	R3	R1	R2	R3	R1	R2	R3	R1	R2	R3	R1	R2	R3	R1	R2	R3	R1	R2	R3	R1	R2	R3	Pos	Pts
2014	Kawasaki	BHI	BHI		OUL	OUL		SNE	SNE		KNO	KNO		BHGP	BHGP		THR	THR		OUL; 19	OUL; 15	OUL; 14	CAD; Ret	CAD; 15		DON	DON		ASS	ASS		SIL	SIL		BHGP	BHGP	BHGP	33rd	4

- * Season still in progress

===== Notes =====
1. – E Denotes riders participating in the Evo class within the British Superbike Championship.

== See also ==
- 2006 British Superbike season
