= Jason O'Halloran (motorcyclist) =

Australian motorcycle racer

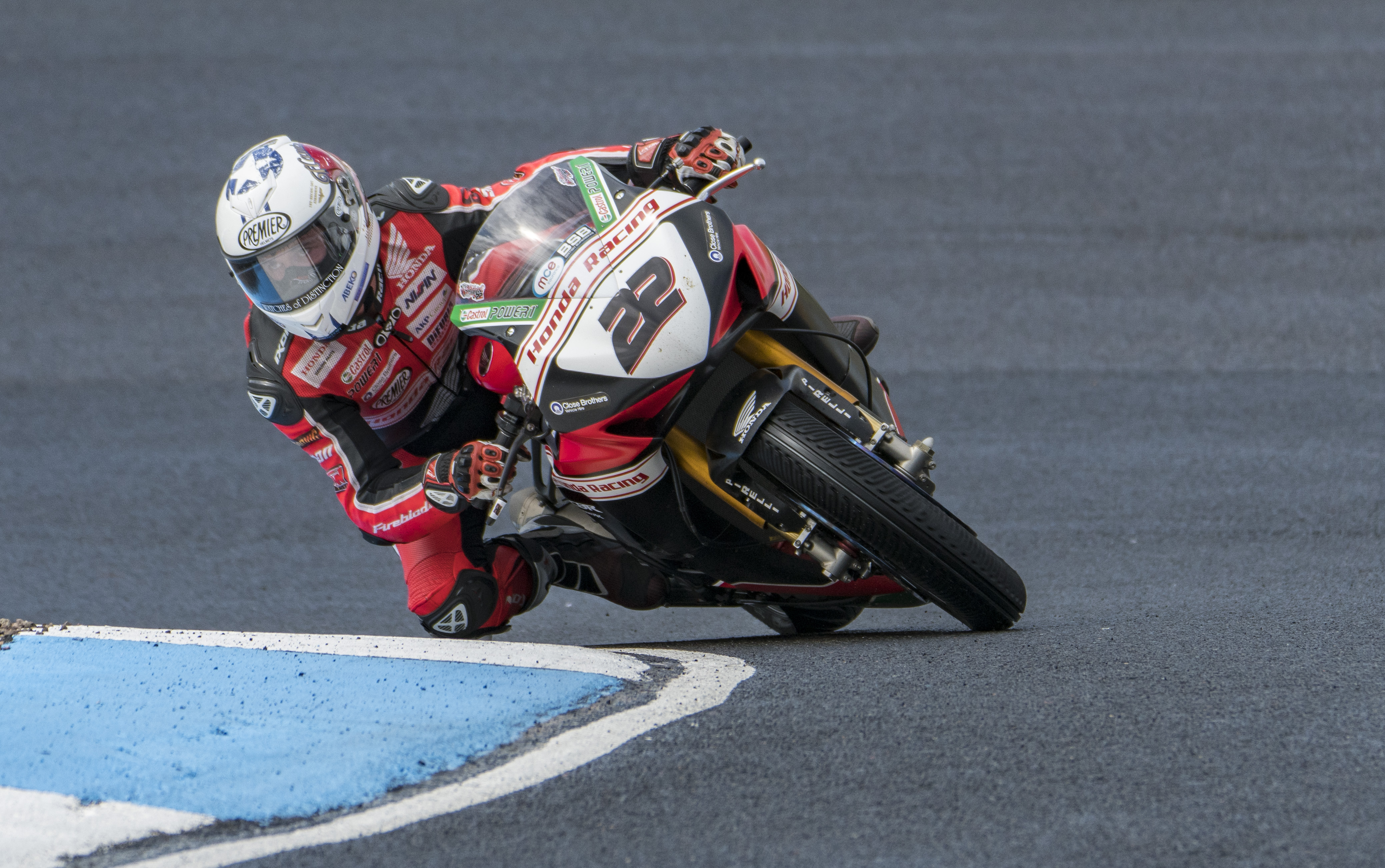
- O'Halloran in 2016
- Nationality: Australian
- Born: 30 December 1987 (age 38); Wollongong, New South Wales, Australia
- Current team: Honda Racing UK
- Bike number: 22
Motorcycle racing career statistics
Moto2 World Championship
Active years	2013
Manufacturers	Motobi
2013 championship position	NC (0 pts)
Starts / Wins / Podiums / Poles / F. laps / Points; 2 / 0 / 0 / 0 / 0 / 0
Superbike World Championship
Active years	2018, 2025
Manufacturers	Honda, Yamaha
2025 championship position	28th (0 pts)
Starts / Wins / Podiums / Poles / F. laps / Points; 7 / 0 / 0 / 0 / 0 / 0
Supersport World Championship
Active years	2007, 2009
Manufacturers	Yamaha, Honda
2009 championship position	NC (0 pts)
Starts / Wins / Podiums / Poles / F. laps / Points; 2 / 0 / 0 / 0 / 0 / 4
British Superbike Championship
Active years	2008–2009, 2012, 2015–2024
Manufacturers	Honda, Yamaha, Kawasaki
Championships	0
2026 championship position	12th (178 pts)
Starts / Wins / Podiums / Poles / F. laps / Points; 306 / 28 / 75 / 29 / 23 / 4762.5

Jason O'Halloran (born 30 December 1987 in Wollongong) is an Australian motorcycle racer, currently competing in the British Superbike Championship (BSB). He made his BSB debut in 2008 with the SMT Honda team and raced full-time in the series from 2009 through 2024. In 2024, he raced for FS-3 Racing Kawasaki, but following the season, O'Halloran transitioned to endurance racing with the YART Yamaha team. He won the 2025 FIM Endurance World Championship, along with teammates Karel Hanika and Marvin Fritz.

== Career ==
O'Halloran was the Australian Supersport champion in 2007. From 2008 until 2024, he rode in the British Superbike Championship, amassing 28 wins and 75 podiums in 306 races. In 2025, he competed in the FIM Endurance World Championship and won the title, and for 2026, he returned to the British Superbike Championship.

== Career statistics ==
=== Supersport World Championship ===
==== Races by year ====
(key)

Year	Bike	1	2	3	4	5	6	7	8	9	10	11	12	13	14	Pos.	Pts
2007	Yamaha	QAT	AUS	EUR	SPA	NED	ITA	GBR	RSM	CZE; 12	GBR	GER	ITA	FRA		35th	4
2009	Honda	AUS	QAT	SPA	NED	ITA	RSA	USA	RSM	GBR	CZE; Ret	GER	ITA	FRA	POR	NC	0

=== British Supersport Championship ===
(key) (Races in bold indicate pole position, races in italics indicate fastest lap)

Year	Bike	1	2	3	4	5	6	7	8	9	10	11	12	Pos	Pts
2010	Triumph/Yamaha	BHI; 4	THR; 10	OUL; DNS	CAD; 10	MAL; Ret	KNO; 10	SNE; 6	BHGP; 4	CAD; 4	CRO; 5	SIL; 3	OUL; 16	8th	94

=== Grand Prix motorcycle racing ===
==== By season ====
Season	Class	Motorcycle	Team	Race	Win	Podium	Pole	FLap	Pts	Plcd
2013	Moto2	Motobi	JiR Moto2	2	0	0	0	0	0	NC
Total				**2**	**0**	**0**	**0**	**0**	**0**	

==== Races by year ====
(key)

Year	Class	Bike	1	2	3	4	5	6	7	8	9	10	11	12	13	14	15	16	17	Pos.	Pts
2013	Moto2	Motobi	QAT	AME	SPA	FRA	ITA	CAT	NED	GER	INP	CZE	GBR; 24	RSM; Ret	ARA	MAL	AUS	JPN	VAL	NC	0

=== Superbike World Championship ===
==== Races by year ====
Year	Bike	1		2		3		4		5		6		7		8		9		10		11		12		13		Pos.	Pts
Year	Bike	R1	R2	R1	R2	R1	R2	R1	R2	R1	R2	R1	R2	R1	R2	R1	R2	R1	R2	R1	R2	R1	R2	R1	R2	R1	R2	Pos.	Pts
2018	Honda	AUS	AUS	THA	THA	SPA	SPA	NED	NED	ITA; Ret	ITA; DNS	GBR	GBR	CZE	CZE	USA	USA	ITA	ITA	POR	POR	FRA	FRA	ARG	ARG	QAT	QAT	NC	0

Year	Bike	1			2			3			4			5			6			7			8			9			10			11			12			Pos	Pts
Year	Bike	R1	SR	R2	R1	SR	R2	R1	SR	R2	R1	SR	R2	R1	SR	R2	R1	SR	R2	R1	SR	R2	R1	SR	R2	R1	SR	R2	R1	SR	R2	R1	SR	R2	R1	SR	R2	Pos	Pts
2025	Yamaha	AUS	AUS	AUS	POR; 17	POR; 20	POR; Ret	NED; 16	NED; 15	NED; 21	ITA	ITA	ITA	CZE	CZE	CZE	EMI	EMI	EMI	GBR	GBR	GBR	HUN	HUN	HUN	FRA	FRA	FRA	ARA	ARA	ARA	POR	POR	POR	SPA	SPA	SPA	28th	0

=== British Superbike Championship ===
==== Races by year ====
(key) (Races in bold indicate pole position; races in italics indicate fastest lap)

Year	Make	1		2		3			4		5		6			7		8			9			10		11		12			13		Pos	Pts
Year	Make	R1	R2	R1	R2	R1	R2	R3	R1	R2	R1	R2	R1	R2	R3	R1	R2	R1	R2	R3	R1	R2	R3	R1	R2	R1	R2	R1	R2	R3	R1	R2	Pos	Pts
2008	Honda	BHGP; C	BHGP; C	THR	THR	OUL	OUL		BHGP	BHGP	DON	DON	SNE	SNE		MAL	MAL	OUL	OUL		KNO	KNO		CAD	CAD	CRO; Ret	CRO; 15	SIL; 7	SIL; 10		BHI; 15	BHI; 12	19th	21
2009	Honda	BHI; 8	BHI; 12	OUL; 8	OUL; 10	DON; 11	DON; Ret		THR; 13	THR; 17	SNE; 12	SNE; 10	KNO; 10	KNO; 12		MAL	MAL	BHGP	BHGP	BHGP	CAD	CAD		CRO	CRO	SIL	SIL	OUL	OUL	OUL			19th	54
2012	Honda	BHI	BHI	THR	THR	OUL	OUL	OUL	SNE	SNE	KNO	KNO	OUL	OUL	OUL	BHGP	BHGP	CAD	CAD		DON	DON		ASS	ASS	SIL	SIL	BHGP; 16	BHGP; 11	BHGP; 11			26th	10
2015	Honda	DON; 19	DON; 11	BHI; 5	BHI; 10	OUL; 7	OUL; 5		SNE; 3	SNE; 3	KNO; 5	KNO; 5	BHGP; Ret	BHGP; 9		THR; DNS	THR; DNS	CAD	CAD		OUL	OUL	OUL	ASS	ASS	SIL	SIL	BHGP	BHGP	BHGP			13th	103
2016	Honda	SIL; 6	SIL; 4	OUL; 4	OUL; 8	BHI; 8	BHI; 6		KNO; 9	KNO; 5	SNE; 1	SNE; 5	THR; 6	THR; 2		BHGP; 4	BHGP; 3	CAD; 3	CAD; 2		OUL; 4	OUL; 4	**OUL**; Ret	DON; 3	DON; Ret	ASS; 5	**ASS**; 3	BHGP; Ret	BHGP; 9	BHGP; 11			5th	568
2017	Honda	DON; 10	DON; 10	BHI; 7	BHI; 5	OUL; 4	OUL; 3		KNO; 4	KNO; 7	SNE; 3	SNE; 3	BHGP; 7	BHGP; 7		THR; 6	THR; 5	CAD; 5	CAD; 4		**SIL**; 11	SIL; 5	SIL; Ret	OUL; 10	OUL; 8	ASS; 10	ASS; 13	BHGP; 6	BHGP; 5	BHGP; 2			5th	567
2018	Honda	DON; 7	DON; 9	BHI; 3	BHI; Ret	OUL; 5	OUL; 2		SNE; Ret	SNE; DNS	KNO; 16	KNO; DNS	BHGP; 14	BHGP; 15		THR; 6	THR; 6	CAD; 13	CAD; 11		SIL; 6	SIL; 4	SIL; 5	OUL; 6	OUL; DNS	ASS; 7	ASS; 11	BHGP; Ret	BHGP; 3	BHGP; 8			8th	176
2019	Yamaha	SIL; Ret	SIL; Ret	OUL; 4	OUL; 7	DON; 5	DON; 7	DON; Ret	BRH; 8	BRH; 9	KNO; Ret	KNO; Ret	SNE; 9	SNE; Ret		THR; 4	THR; 4	CAD; 7	CAD; 14		OUL; 6	OUL; 6	OUL; 6	ASS; 3	ASS; 7	DON; 11	DON; 10	BHGP; 6	BHGP; 7	BHGP; 7			10th	195

Year	Make	1			2			3			4			5			6			7			8			9			10			11			Pos	Pts
Year	Make	R1	R2	R3	R1	R2	R3	R1	R2	R3	R1	R2	R3	R1	R2	R3	R1	R2	R3	R1	R2	R3	R1	R2	R3	R1	R2	R3	R1	R2	R3	R1	R2	R3	Pos	Pts
2020	Yamaha	**DON**; 8	DON; 3	DON; 3	SNE; 8	SNE; 8	SNE; 7	SIL; 3	SIL; 3	SIL; 3	**OUL**; 1	**OUL**; 1	OUL; 4	DON; 14	DON; 2	**DON**; 8	BHGP; 1	**BHGP**; 2	BHGP; 3																2nd	267
2021	Yamaha	OUL; 1	**OUL**; 1	OUL; 1	**KNO**; 2	KNO; Ret	KNO; 6	BHGP; 5	BHGP; 1	**BHGP**; 3	**THR**; 1	THR; 1	**THR**; 1	**DON**; 1	DON; 3	DON; 12	CAD; 2	CAD; 2	CAD; 1	SNE; 3	SNE; 1	SNE; 3	**SIL**; Ret	SIL; 2	SIL; 1	OUL; Ret	**OUL**; 2	OUL; Ret	DON; 5	DON; 9	DON; 8	BHGP; 4	BHGP; 3	BHGP; 3	3rd	1162
2022	Yamaha	SIL; 5	SIL; 6	SIL; 5	OUL; 8	OUL; 6	OUL; 6	**DON**; 2	**DON**; 1	DON; 1	KNO; 2	KNO; 1	KNO; 1	**BHGP**; 1	BHGP; 2	BHGP; 2	**THR**; 1	THR; 1	THR; 3	CAD; 4	CAD; 8	CAD; 9	SNE; 12	SNE; 9	SNE; 5	OUL; Ret	**OUL**; DNS	OUL; DNS	**DON**; 2	DON; 7	DON; Ret	BHGP; 6	BHGP; Ret	BHGP; DNS	5th	1087
2023	Yamaha	SIL; 4	SIL; 5	**SIL**; 4	OUL; Ret	OUL; Ret	OUL; 10	DON; 14	DON; 1	DON; 7	KNO; 3	**KNO**; 3	KNO; Ret	**SNE**; 3	SNE; 5	SNE; 6	BRH; 5	BRH; 6	BRH; 6	**THR**; 1	THR; 1	THR; 1	CAD; 4	CAD; 3	CAD; 6	OUL; 8	OUL; 8	OUL; 9	**DON**; 17	DON; 5	DON; 1	**BRH**; 2	**BRH**; Ret	BRH; 7	6th	365.5
2024	Kawasaki	NAV; 10	NAV; 6		OUL; 7	OUL; 6	OUL; 7	DON; 8	DON; Ret	DON; 1	KNO; 5	KNO; Ret	KNO; Ret	SNE; 4	SNE; 8	SNE; 9	BRH; 9	BRH; 11	BRH; 8	THR; 3	THR; WD	THR; WD	**CAD**; 6	CAD; 10	CAD; WD	OUL; 9	OUL; 6	OUL; DNS	DON; 13	DON; 12	DON; Ret	BRH	BRH	BRH	13th	187

=== FIM Endurance World Championship ===
Year	Team	Bike	Tyre	Rider	Pts	TC
2025	Yamaha Austria Racing Team	Yamaha YZF-R1	**B**	(Australia) Jason O'Halloran (Germany) Marvin Fritz (Czech Republic) Karel Hanika	139	1st

==== Suzuka 8 Hours results ====
Year	Team	Bike	Riders	Pos
2025	(Austria) YART Yamaha	Yamaha YZF-R1	(Czech Republic) Karel Hanika (Germany) Marvin Fritz (Australia) Jason O'Halloran	Ret
