= Chris Burns =

Chris Burns may refer to:

- Chris Burns (Canadian football) (born 1972), former Canadian football player
- Chris Burns (footballer) (born 1967), former English footballer and manager
- Chris Burns (politician) (born 1949), former Australian politician
