= Jon Kirkham =

British motorcycle racer

- Nationality: British
- Born: 16 November 1984 (age 42); Derby, England
- Website: jonkirkhamracing.co.uk

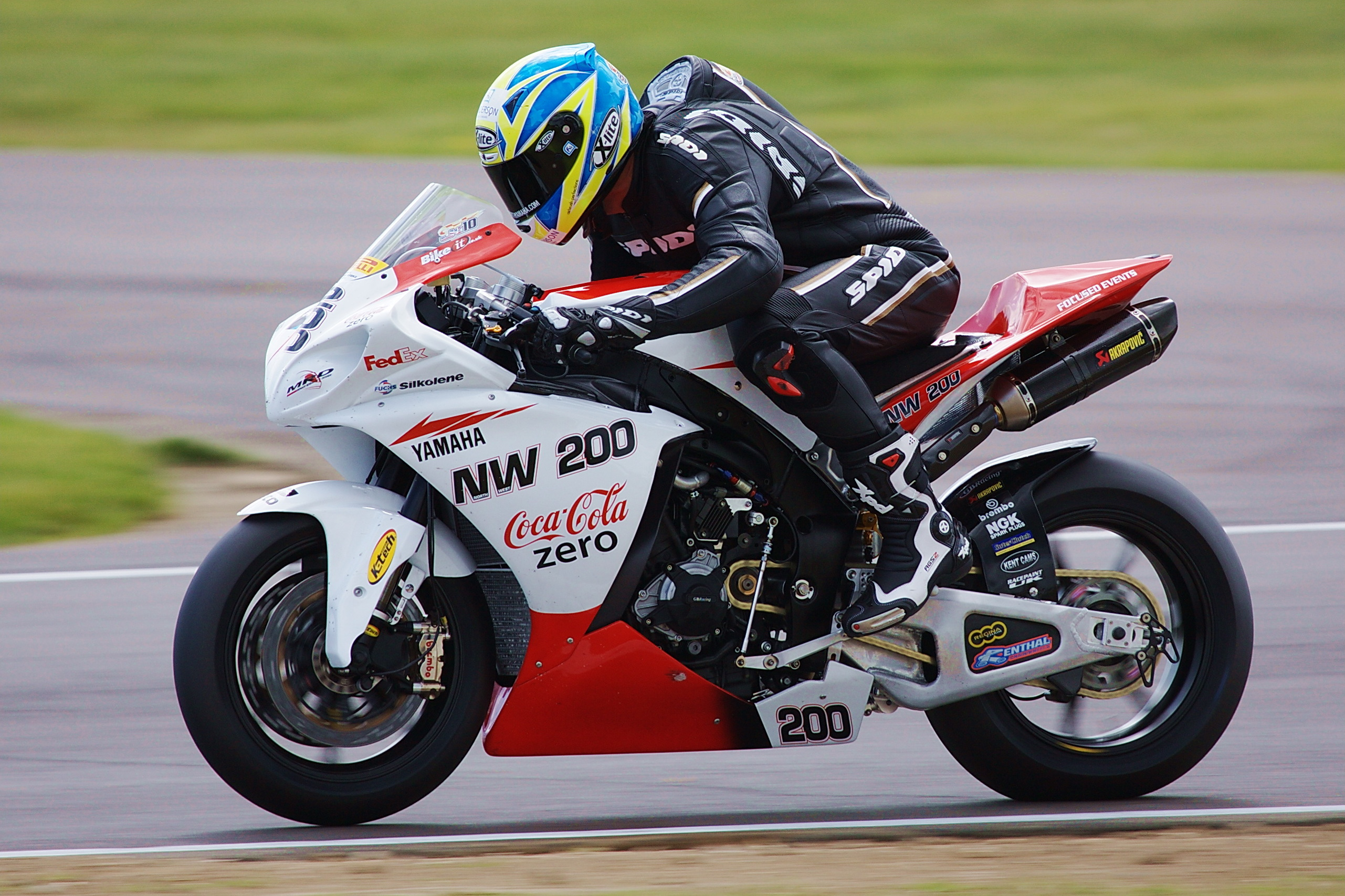

Jon Kirkham (born 16 November 1984 in Derby, Derbyshire), is a British motorcycle racer best known for his performances in the National Superstock 1000 championship, Kirkham was runner up in 2009 before winning that championship in 2010. Kirkham moved into British Superbike Championship for 2011 with the Samsung crescent Suzuki team, claiming his first win in that series at Croft.

== Career statistics ==
Stats correct as of 9 July 2012

- 2008 - 25th, FIM Superstock 1000 Cup, Yamaha YZF-R1

=== All Time ===
Series	Years active	Races	Poles	Podiums	Wins	2nd place	3rd place	Fast Laps	Titles
Supersport World Championship	_{2002}	1	0	0	0	0	0	0	0
British Superbike Championship	_{2003–06, 2011–}	125	1	4	2	1	1	2	0
National Superstock 1000	_{2007–10}	38	9	24	7	13	4	0	1
FIM Superstock 1000 Championship	_{2008}	1	0	0	0	0	0	0	0
Total		165	10	27	9	14	5	2	1

==== Supersport World Championship ====
Year	Bike	1	2	3	4	5	6	7	8	9	10	11	12	Pos	Pts	Ref
2002	Honda	ESP	AUS	RSA	JPN	ITA	GBR; 25	GER	SMR	GBR	GER	NED	ITA	NC	0	

==== British Superbike Championship ====
Year	Make	1		2		3			4		5		6			7		8			9			10		11		12			13		Pos	Pts	Ref
Year	Make	R1	R2	R1	R2	R1	R2	R3	R1	R2	R1	R2	R1	R2	R3	R1	R2	R1	R2	R3	R1	R2	R3	R1	R2	R1	R2	R1	R2	R3	R1	R2	Pos	Pts	Ref
2003	Yamaha	SIL; Ret	SIL; Ret	SNE; 10	SNE; 11	THR; Ret	THR; Ret		OUL; 11	OUL; Ret	KNO; Ret	KNO; 13	BHI; Ret	BHI; 16		ROC; 11	ROC; Ret	MON; 12	MON; 11		OUL; Ret	OUL; DNS		CAD; Ret	CAD; 11	BHGP; 12	BHGP; 11	DON; 10	DON; 8				16th	62	
2004	Suzuki	SIL; 13	SIL; 11	BHI; 8	BHI; 11	SNE; Ret	SNE; DNS		OUL; 14	OUL; 12	MON; 11	MON; 13	THR; 14	THR; 11		BHGP; 13	BHGP; Ret	KNO; 5	KNO; 11		MAL; Ret	MAL; 16		CRO; 15	CRO; 13	CAD; 12	CAD; 14	OUL; 17	OUL; 14		DON; 12	DON; Ret	15th	77	
2005	Kawasaki	BHI; 21	BHI; 17	THR; 18	THR; 18	MAL; 16	MAL; 17		OUL; 17	OUL; 12	MON; 12	MON; 12	CRO; DNS	CRO; DNS		KNO	KNO	SNE	SNE		SIL	SIL		CAD; Ret	CAD; DNS	OUL	OUL	DON	DON		BHGP	BHGP	25th	12	
2006	Suzuki	BHI; 16	BHI; 12	DON; Ret	DON; DNS	THR; 16	THR; 16		OUL; 15	OUL; 12	MON; C	MON; C	MAL; Ret	MAL; 15		SNE; Ret	SNE; 9	KNO; Ret	KNO; DNS		OUL	OUL		CRO; 19	CRO; 14	CAD; 9	CAD; 14	SIL; Ret	SIL; 16		BHGP; Ret	BHGP; Ret	22nd	28	
2008	Yamaha	THR	THR	OUL	OUL	BHGP	BHGP		DON	DON	SNE	SNE	MAL	MAL		OUL	OUL	KNO	KNO		CAD	CAD		CRO	CRO	SIL	SIL	BHI; 9	BHI; 10				22nd	13	
2009	Yamaha	BHI; 15	BHI; 16	OUL; 13	OUL; 11	DON; 13	DON; 13		THR	THR	SNE; 14	SNE; 13	KNO	KNO		MAL	MAL	BHGP	BHGP	BHGP	CAD; 16	CAD; 15		CRO	CRO	SIL	SIL	OUL	OUL	OUL			24th	21	
2011	Suzuki	BHI; 5	BHI; Ret	OUL; 7	OUL; 7	CRO; 1	CRO; Ret		THR; Ret	THR; 9	KNO; 8	KNO; 11	SNE; 6	SNE; Ret		OUL; 9	OUL; C	BHGP; 9	BHGP; 8	BHGP; 10	CAD; 4	CAD; 6	CAD; 6	DON; 5	DON; 3	SIL; 27	SIL; 6	BHGP; 8	BHGP; 2	BHGP; Ret			7th	210	
2012	Honda	BHI; 1	BHI; C	THR; 7	THR; 7	OUL; DNS	OUL; DNS	OUL; DNS	SNE; Ret	SNE; 14	KNO; 12	KNO; 14	OUL; Ret	OUL; Ret	OUL; 14	BHGP; 12	BHGP; 14	CAD; 5	CAD; 12		DON; 7	DON; 9		ASS; 13	ASS; Ret	SIL; 12	SIL; 14	BHGP; 9	BHGP; 8	BHGP; 8			12th	122	
2013	BMW	BHI; 4	BHI; 6	THR; 5	THR; 8	OUL; 4	OUL; 4		KNO; Ret	KNO; 8	SNE; 11	SNE; Ret	BHGP; 6	BHGP; 7		OUL; 8	OUL; 5	OUL; 9	CAD; 13	CAD; 10	DON; 6	DON; 7		ASS; 9	ASS; 4	SIL; 6	SIL; 7	BHGP; 14	BHGP; 8	BHGP; 6			7th	213	

Year	Make	1			2			3			4			5			6			7			8			9			10			11			12			Pos	Pts
Year	Make	R1	R2	R3	R1	R2	R3	R1	R2	R3	R1	R2	R3	R1	R2	R3	R1	R2	R3	R1	R2	R3	R1	R2	R3	R1	R2	R3	R1	R2	R3	R1	R2	R3	R1	R2	R3	Pos	Pts
2014	Kawasaki	BHI; 21	BHI; DNS		OUL; 9	OUL; 10		SNE	SNE		KNO; 17	KNO; 17		BHGP; 13	BHGP; 6		THR; 11	THR; 6		OUL; 14	OUL; 8	OUL; 9	CAD; 8	CAD; 6		DON; 12	DON; 13		ASS; Ret	ASS; Ret		SIL; Ret	SIL; 15		BHGP; 3	BHGP; 7	BHGP; 7	12th	118

- * Season still in progress

==== National Superstock 1000 ====
Year	Bike	1	2	3	4	5	6	7	8	9	10	11	12	13	14	15	Pos	Pts	Ref
2007	Yamaha	BHGP; Ret	THR; Ret	SIL; 24	OUL; 16	SNE; 7	MON1; 7	MON2; 7	KNO	OUL	CRO; 2	CAD; 4	DON1; 2	DON2; 2	BHI1; 3	BHI2; 5	5th	128	
2008	Yamaha	BHGP; 2	THR; 2	OUL; 2	DON; Ret	SNE; 2	OUL1; 2	OUL2; 1	KNO; 2	CAD; 2	CRO; 1	SIL; 1	BHI; Ret				2nd	215	
2010	BMW	BHI; 3	THR; 7	OUL; 2	CAD; 2	SIL1; 4	SIL2; 3	KNO; 3	SNE; 4	BHGP; 1	CAD; 2	CRO; 1	SIL; C	OUL1; 1	OUL2; 1		1st	253	

==== Superstock 1000 FIM Cup ====
Year	Bike	1	2	3	4	5	6	7	8	9	10	Pos	Pts	Ref
2008	Yamaha	ESP	NED	ITA	GER	SMR	CZE	GBR; DNS	EUR; 5	FRA	POR	25th	11	

==== Superbike World Championship ====
Year	Make	1		2		3		4		5		6		7		8		9		10		11		12		13		Pos	Pts	Ref
Year	Make	R1	R2	R1	R2	R1	R2	R1	R2	R1	R2	R1	R2	R1	R2	R1	R2	R1	R2	R1	R2	R1	R2	R1	R2	R1	R2	Pos	Pts	Ref
2011	Suzuki	AUS	AUS	EUR	EUR	NED	NED	ITA	ITA	USA	USA	SMR	SMR	SPA	SPA	CZE	CZE	GBR; 14	GBR; 15	GER	GER	ITA	ITA	FRA	FRA	POR	POR	31st	3	
