= 2008 British Superbike Championship =

British motorcycle racing season

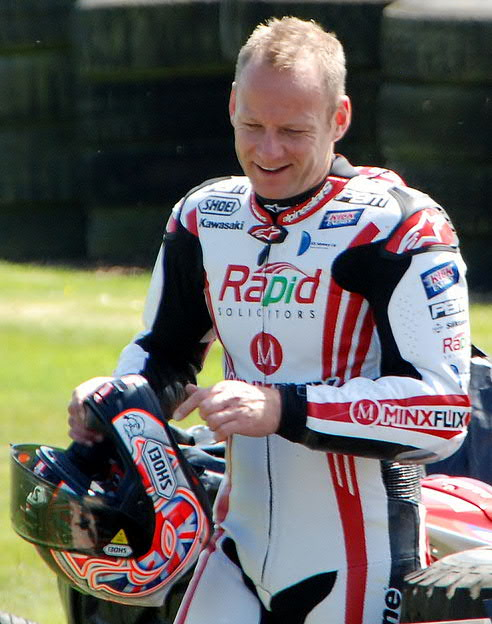
2008 champion, Shane Byrne

The 2008 British Superbike Championship season was scheduled to begin on 6 April 2008; however, snow at Brands Hatch forced the abandonment of the day's races, which were later rescheduled. The series was rescheduled to start on 20 April and end on 12 October 2008.

Starting with this season the championship has a single tyre supplier.

Pirelli beat Dunlop to sign a three-year deal.

For the 2008 season the engine configuration regulations were changed in parallel with those of the World Superbike Championship, to permit the racing of 1200 cc V-twins against 1000 cc four-cylinder machines.

Reigning Champion Ryuichi Kiyonari left for the Superbike World Championship, so Shane Byrne became a two-time BSB Champion on a Airwaves sponsored GSE Racing Ducati 1098.

== Calendar ==
2008 Calendar
Round		Circuit	Date	Pole position	Fastest lap	Winning rider	Winning team
-	R1	(England) Brands Hatch GP	6 April	(England) Shane Byrne^{1}	Abandoned took place on 11 May^{2}		
-	R2	(England) Brands Hatch GP	6 April	(England) Shane Byrne^{1}	Abandoned took place on 11 May^{2}		
1	R1	(England) Thruxton	20 April	(England) Shane Byrne	(England) Shane Byrne	(England) Shane Byrne	Airwaves Ducati
1	R2	(England) Thruxton	20 April	(England) Shane Byrne	(England) Cal Crutchlow	(England) Cal Crutchlow	HM Plant Honda
2	R1	(England) Oulton Park	5 May	(England) Cal Crutchlow	(England) Cal Crutchlow	(England) Shane Byrne	Airwaves Ducati
2	R2	(England) Oulton Park	5 May	(England) Cal Crutchlow	(England) Shane Byrne	(England) Shane Byrne	Airwaves Ducati
3	R1	(England) Brands Hatch GP	11 May	(England) Shane Byrne	(England) Shane Byrne	(England) Shane Byrne	Airwaves Ducati
3	R2	(England) Brands Hatch GP	11 May	(England) Shane Byrne	(England) Shane Byrne	(England) Cal Crutchlow	HM Plant Honda
4	R1	(England) Donington Park	26 May	(England) Shane Byrne	(England) Shane Byrne	(England) Shane Byrne	Airwaves Ducati
4	R2	(England) Donington Park	26 May	(England) Shane Byrne	(England) Shane Byrne	(England) Shane Byrne	Airwaves Ducati
5	R1	(England) Snetterton	15 June	(England) Shane Byrne	(England) Leon Camier	(England) Leon Camier	Airwaves Ducati
5	R2	(England) Snetterton	15 June	(England) Shane Byrne	(England) Shane Byrne	(England) Shane Byrne	Airwaves Ducati
6	R1	(England) Mallory Park	29 June	(England) Tom Sykes	(England) Tom Sykes	(England) Shane Byrne	Airwaves Ducati
6	R2	(England) Mallory Park	29 June	(England) Tom Sykes	(England) Cal Crutchlow	(England) Michael Rutter	NW 200 Ducati
7	R1	(England) Oulton Park	20 July	(England) Cal Crutchlow	(England) Tom Sykes	(England) Tom Sykes	Rizla Suzuki
7	R2	(England) Oulton Park	20 July	(England) Cal Crutchlow	(England) Tom Sykes	(England) Tom Sykes	Rizla Suzuki
8	R1	(Scotland) Knockhill	10 August	(England) Leon Haslam	(Northern Ireland) Michael Laverty	(England) Tom Sykes	Rizla Suzuki
8	R2	(Scotland) Knockhill	10 August	(England) Leon Haslam	(England) Leon Haslam	(England) Leon Haslam	HM Plant Honda
9	R1	(England) Cadwell Park	25 August	(England) Tom Sykes	(England) Tom Sykes	(England) Leon Haslam	HM Plant Honda
9	R2	(England) Cadwell Park	25 August	(England) Tom Sykes	(England) Leon Haslam	(England) Leon Haslam	HM Plant Honda
10	R1	(England) Croft	14 September	(England) Cal Crutchlow	(England) Shane Byrne	(England) Leon Camier	Airwaves Ducati
10	R2	(England) Croft	14 September	(England) Cal Crutchlow	(England) Shane Byrne	(England) Leon Haslam	HM Plant Honda
11	R1	(England) Silverstone International	28 September	(England) Cal Crutchlow	(England) Leon Haslam	(England) Leon Camier	Airwaves Ducati
11	R2	(England) Silverstone International	28 September	(England) Cal Crutchlow	(England) Shane Byrne	(England) Leon Haslam	HM Plant Honda
12	R1	(England) Brands Hatch Indy	12 October	(England) Shane Byrne	(England) Shane Byrne	(England) Shane Byrne	Airwaves Ducati
12	R2	(England) Brands Hatch Indy	12 October	(England) Shane Byrne	(England) Leon Haslam	(England) Shane Byrne	Airwaves Ducati

Notes:

1. – The qualifying results from the original meeting were carried forward to the rescheduled meeting.
2. – The opening meeting at Brands Hatch GP was cancelled due to heavy snowfall on the Sunday; the meeting was rescheduled for 11 May.

== Entry list ==
2008 entry list
Team	Bike	No.	Riders	Class	Rounds
Airwaves Ducati	Ducati 1098R	2	(England) Leon Camier		1–6, 8–12
Airwaves Ducati	Ducati 1098R	67	(England) Shane Byrne		1–12
MSS Discovery Kawasaki	Kawasaki ZXR1000	3	(Scotland) Stuart Easton		1–4, 9–12
MSS Discovery Kawasaki	Kawasaki ZXR1000	8	(Australia) Billy McConnell		1–12
MSS Discovery Kawasaki	Kawasaki ZXR1000	86	(England) James Haydon*		6–7
Relentless Suzuki	Suzuki GSX-R1000	4	(Northern Ireland) Michael Laverty		1–12
Rob Mac Racing Yamaha	Yamaha YZF-R1	5	(England) Karl Harris		1–2, 4–11
Hawk Kawasaki	Kawasaki ZXR1000	6	(England) James Haydon*		
Hawk Kawasaki	Kawasaki ZXR1000	88	(England) Scott Smart		1–12
Bike Animal Honda	Honda CBR1000RR	9	(England) Guy Martin		1–3, 5–12
Bike Animal Honda	Honda CBR1000RR	7	(England) James Ellison		1–8, 10–12
SMT Honda	Honda CBR1000RR	11	(England) Adam Jenkinson		
Rizla Suzuki	Suzuki GSX-R1000	14	(Japan) Atsushi Watanabe		1–12
Rizla Suzuki	Suzuki GSX-R1000	66	(England) Tom Sykes		1–12
British Jentin Yamaha	Yamaha YZF-R1	17	(England) Simon Andrews		1–12
Hardinge Honda	Honda CBR1000RR	21	(England) Tom Tunstall	C	
AIM Yamaha	Yamaha YZF-R1	22	(England) Steve Plater		2
Tena for Men Honda	Honda CBR1000RR	27	(England) Tristan Palmer		1–12
Tena for Men Honda	Honda CBR1000RR	33	(England) Michael Howarth	C	
Holdtight Yamaha	Yamaha YZF-R1	31	(England) Nick Pusey	C	
HM Plant Honda	Honda CBR1000RR	35	(England) Cal Crutchlow		1–12
HM Plant Honda	Honda CBR1000RR	91	(England) Leon Haslam		1–12
Riders Honda	Honda CBR1000RR	40	(England) Martin Jessopp	C	
Bike Shop Faversham	Yamaha YZF-R1	44	(England) Steve Mercer	C	
PDM Racing	Suzuki GSX-R1000	51	(England) Luke Quigley	C	
MV Agusta	MV F4312	53	(England) Chris Burns	C	
Quay Honda	Honda CBR1000RR	56	(England) James Buckingham	C	
Red Viper Honda	Honda CBR1000RR	64	(England) Aaron Zanotti		
PR Branson Honda	Honda CBR1000RR	68	(Australia) David Johnson		
TAG Honda MAC Racing	Honda CBR1000RR	99	(Republic of Ireland) Brian McCormack	C	
MAR ARP Kawasaki	Kawasaki ZXR1000	111	(England) Malcolm Ashley	C	
Co-ordit Yamaha	Yamaha YZF-R1	118	(England) Dean Ellison	C	
North West 200 Ducati	Ducati 1098R	200	(England) Michael Rutter		

Icon	Class
C	Privateers Cup

Key
Regular Rider
Wildcard Rider
Replacement Rider

=== Support races ===
- Fuchs-Silkolene British Supersport Championship: Winner - Glen Richards
- Metzeler National Superstock 1000 Championship: Winner - Steve Brogan
- Metzeler Junior Superstock 600 Championship: Winner - Lee Johnson
- Henderson Yamaha R1 Cup: Winner - Jon Kirkham
- British 125 GP Championship: Winner - Matthew Hoyle
- KTM 990 Super Duke Challenge: Winner - David Wood

== Season standings ==
Points system
Position	**1st**	**2nd**	**3rd**	**4th**	**5th**	**6th**	**7th**	**8th**	**9th**	**10th**	**11th**	**12th**	**13th**	**14th**	**15th**
Race	25	20	16	13	11	10	9	8	7	6	5	4	3	2	1

=== Riders' standings ===
Pos.	Rider	Bike	THR (England)		OUL (England)		BHGP (England)		DON (England)		SNE (England)		MAL (England)		OUL (England)		KNO (Scotland)		CAD (England)		CRO (England)		SIL (England)		BHI (England)		Pts
Pos.	Rider	Bike	R1	R2	R1	R2	R1	R2	R1	R2	R1	R2	R1	R2	R1	R2	R1	R2	R1	R2	R1	R2	R1	R2	R1	R2	Pts
1	(England) Shane Byrne	Ducati	**1**	**2**	1	1	**1**	**2**	**1**	**1**	**2**	**1**	1	2	3	3	2	Ret	3	3	5	4	3	2	**1**	**1**	**474**
2	(England) Leon Haslam	Honda	4	Ret	2	DSQ	4	6	2	2	5	5	2	6	4	4	Ret	1	1	1	2	1	11	1	4	2	**357**
3	(England) Cal Crutchlow	Honda	2	1	6	Ret	3	1	6	3	4	3	3	3	6	2	Ret	7	5	13	4	3	2	Ret	2	4	**318**
4	(England) Tom Sykes	Suzuki	6	8	5	Ret	2	Ret	3	6	3	7	4	4	1	1	1	4	2	2	3	2	DSQ	3	6	Ret	**316**
5	(England) Leon Camier	Ducati	5	4	3	3	5	3	5	4	1	2	Ret	8			5	8	4	4	1	5	1	4	5	3	**306**
6	(England) Michael Rutter	Ducati	3	3	4	6	Ret	5	8	8	9	4	Ret	1	7	11	4	2	6	5	6	6	4	7	7	6	**256**
7	(England) James Ellison	Honda	7	7	8	2	6	8	4	5	7	10	5	11	2	5	3	5			9	7	Ret	6	3	5	**230**
8	(England) Simon Andrews	Yamaha	8	Ret	Ret	7	9	Ret	10	9	10	8	7	7	5	6	8	6	7	6	10	9	5	8	8	7	**176**
9	(Northern Ireland) Michael Laverty	Suzuki	10	5	7	4	Ret	4	9	Ret	6	6	11	Ret	9	7	6	21	8	9	7	10	Ret	15	Ret	Ret	**141**
10	(England) Tristan Palmer	Honda	13	13	9	11	10	11	12	14	13	9	8	9	28	12	9	12	11	12	14	14	6	12	10	13	**111**
11	(England) Karl Harris	Yamaha	Ret	Ret	Ret	Ret			7	7	8	Ret	Ret	5	26	9	7	3	Ret	10	8	8	Ret	5	DNS	DNS	**102**
12	(Australia) Billy McConnell	Kawasaki	14	10	Ret	10	8	9	Ret	Ret	11	11	6	16	8	10	Ret	9	12	24	17	Ret	10	9	12	Ret	**91**
13	(Scotland) Stuart Easton	Kawasaki	9	6	10	5	7	7	11	11									Ret	14	15	13	8	11	Ret	Ret	**81**
14	(England) Scott Smart	Kawasaki	16	12	11	8	11	10	15	12	Ret	Ret	Ret	10	11	8	Ret	13	13	8	13	Ret	Ret	Ret	21	20	**69**
15	(Japan) Atsushi Watanabe	Suzuki	17	14	13	9	12	Ret	17	13	12	20	9	20	13	17	Ret	15	9	7	12	12	9	Ret	14	14	**69**
16	(England) Gary Mason	Honda							18	10	14	12	13	23	Ret	14	10	17	10	Ret	11	11	DSQ	DSQ	11	9	**51**
17	(Northern Ireland) John Laverty	Ducati	12	11	20	14	16	13	16	16	16	16	10	14	10	13			14	15	16	16	13	21	13	8	**49**
18	(England) Guy Martin	Honda	15	9	12	Ret	13	12			Ret	Ret	16	17	Ret	18	Ret	14	15	11	18	Ret	Ret	Ret	16	15	**28**
19	(Australia) Jason O'Halloran	Honda																			Ret	15	7	10	15	12	**21**
20	(England) Chris Burns	MV Agusta	18	Ret	16	18	14	Ret	Ret	Ret			15	13	Ret	Ret	15	10	16	17	19	Ret	13	Ret	21	11	**21**
21	(Australia) David Johnson	Honda	19	Ret	17	16	Ret	16	Ret	Ret	18	14	12	12	Ret	Ret	13	DNS	Ret	16	20	17	12	14	19	Ret	**21**
22	(England) Jon Kirkham	Yamaha																							9	10	**13**
23	(England) Steve Mercer	Yamaha	20	Ret	15	Ret																					10
23	(England) Steve Mercer	Kawasaki															12	11									10
24	(England) Tom Grant	Honda			Ret	16			13	Ret							15	19									**10**
25	(England) Dean Ellison	Yamaha	21	15	Ret	Ret			14	15	17	15	14	18	14	16	Ret	19	Ret	DNS							**9**
26	(England) James Haydon	Kawasaki											Ret	15	12	15					19	DNS					**6**
27	(England) Sean Emmett	Yamaha	11	Ret																							5
27	(England) Sean Emmett	Honda											Ret	DNS													5
28	(England) Steve Plater	Yamaha			Ret	12																					**4**
29	(England) Marshall Neill	Honda										15	13														**4**
30	(England) Martin Jessopp	Honda	25	16	23	18	15	17			22	21	17	22	16	20	14	16	17	18	21	20	15	17	18	18	**4**
31	(England) Luke Quigley	Suzuki	28	Ret	18	14	Ret	15	Ret	18																	**3**
32	(England) Aaron Zanotti	Honda	22	19	21	Ret	19	14	Ret	Ret	19	17	18	19	24	19	17	23	22	22							**2**
33	(England) Peter Hickman	Honda																					14	16	25	16	**2**
	(England) Tom Tunstall	Honda	26	18	14	21	Ret	18	19	17	21	18	19	21	17	23	18	20	19	19	22	18	17	19	23	19	**0**
	(England) Malcolm Ashley	Kawasaki	23	17	19	22	Ret	Ret					20	DNS											24	22	**0**
	(England) James Buckingham	Honda	24	20	22	20	Ret	DNS																			**0**
	(England) Leon Morris	Ducati	27	21	17	24	DNS	20	20	19	20	19			Ret	Ret	16	Ret	21	21			18	21	Ret	20	**0**
	(England) Michael Howarth	Honda	23	22	Ret	23	18	19	21	21					20	26	20	18	Ret	23	23	Ret					**0**
	(Republic of Ireland) Brain McCormack	Honda	Ret	23																							**0**
	(Australia) Shannon Etheridge	Kawasaki							Ret	20	Ret	22			Ret	22	19	22	20	20	Ret	19	19	20	17	17	**0**
	(Scotland) Dan Stewart	Honda													23	21							16	18			**0**
	(England) Howie Mainwaring	Suzuki													Ret	DNS											**0**
	(England) Francis Williamson	Ducati													Ret	25							20	22	Ret	Ret	**0**
	(England) Kenny Gilbertson	Kawasaki													Ret	DNS	Ret	DNS	18	DNS							**0**
	(England) Victor Cox	Yamaha																							18	Ret	**0**

Colour	Result
Gold	Winner
Silver	Second place
Bronze	Third place
Green	Points classification
Blue	Non-points classification
Blue	Non-classified finish (NC)
Purple	Retired, not classified (Ret)
Red	Did not qualify (DNQ)
Red	Did not pre-qualify (DNPQ)
Black	Disqualified (DSQ)
White	Did not start (DNS)
White	Withdrew (WD)
White	Race cancelled (C)
Blank	Did not practice (DNP)
Blank	Did not arrive (DNA)
Blank	Excluded (EX)

**Bold** - Pole
Italics - Fastest lap

=== Privateers Cup ===
2008 Final Privateers Cup standings
Pos	Rider	Bike	THR (England)		OUL (England)		BHGP (England)		DON (England)		SNE (England)		MAL (England)		OUL (England)		KNO (Scotland)		CAD (England)		CRO (England)		SIL (England)		BHI (England)		Pts
Pos	Rider	Bike	R1	R2	R1	R2	R1	R2	R1	R2	R1	R2	R1	R2	R1	R2	R1	R2	R1	R2	R1	R2	R1	R2	R1	R2	Pts
1	(Northern Ireland) John Laverty	Ducati	12	11	20	14	16	13	16	16	16	16	10	14	10	13			14	15	16	16	13	21	13	8	**469**
2	(England) Martin Jessopp	Honda	25	16	23	18	15	17			22	21	17	22	16	20	14	16	17	18	21	20	15	17	18	18	328
3	(England) Gary Mason	Honda							18	10	14	12	13	23	Ret	14	10	17	10	Ret	11	11	DSQ	DSQ	11	9	**307**
4	(England) Tom Tunstall	Honda	26	18	14	21	Ret	18	19	17	21	18	19	21	17	23	18	20	19	19	22	18	17	19	23	19	283
5	(England) Chris Burns	MV Agusta	18	Ret	16	18	14	Ret	Ret	Ret			15	13	Ret	Ret	15	10	16	17	19	Ret	13	Ret	21	11	**267**
6	(England) Leon Morris	Ducati	27	21	17	24	DNS	20	20	19	20	19			Ret	Ret	16	Ret	21	21			18	21	Ret	20	165
7	(Australia) Shannon Etheridge	Kawasaki							Ret	20	Ret	22			Ret	22	19	22	20	20	Ret	19	19	20	17	17	134
8	(England) Michael Howarth	Honda	23	22	Ret	23	18	19	21	21					20	26	20	18	Ret	23	23	Ret					127
9	(England) Malcolm Ashley	Kawasaki	23	17	19	22	Ret	Ret					20	DNS											24	22	75
10	(England) Luke Quigley	Suzuki	28	Ret	18	14	Ret	15	Ret	18																	73
11	(Scotland) Dan Stewart	Honda													23	21							16	18			58
12	(England) James Buckingham	Honda	24	20	22	20	Ret	DNS																			42
13	(England) Steve Mercer	Yamaha	20	Ret	15	Ret																					41
13	(England) Steve Mercer	Kawasaki															12	11									41
14	(England) Francis Williamson	Ducati													Ret	25							20	22	Ret	Ret	27
15	(England) Kenny Gilbertson	Kawasaki													Ret	DNS	Ret	DNS	18	DNS							11
16	(England) Victor Cox	Yamaha																							18	Ret	10
17	(Republic of Ireland) Brian McCormack	Honda	Ret	23																							8

John Laverty won the Cup class on his Buildbase NW200 Ducati.
