= 2012 British Superbike Championship =

British motorcycle racing season

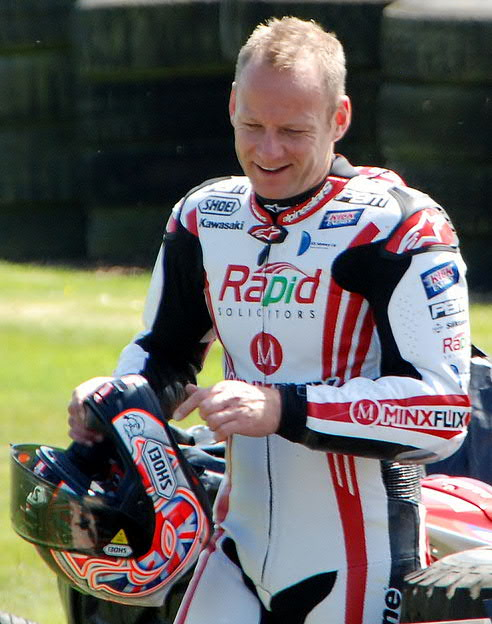
2012 champion, Shane Byrne

The 2012 British Superbike season was the 25th British Superbike Championship season. For the 2012 season, MSVR announced a number of changes to the technical regulations of the spectacle of them British Superbike Championship. The championship will be limited to 32 entries, with 16 teams each entering two bikes. This was designed to be a way of rewarding teams that have had a history of competing in the BSB regularly. Teams who had competed in the 2011 season were given automatic entries, whilst teams who wish to graduate to the BSB class had to buy an entry.

The championship was tightly contested between Shane Byrne, Josh Brookes and Tommy Hill, with the title battle lasting until the final round at Brands Hatch. The first race saw Byrne taking the victory, after Alex Lowes' crash caused the red flag to be thrown. The second race also resulted in a win for Byrne, taking the points standings to 658 for Byrne and 635 for Brookes. The final race thus became a decider, with Byrne only having to finish 13th to win the championship, whilst Brookes needed Byrne to retire, or finish in 15th place to win the title. On the penultimate lap Byrne passed Brookes and became the British Superbikes champion for 2012.

== Rule changes ==
All bikes on the grid had to become part of the Evo class, creating a single-class championship. All bikes had to run a standard ECU (Electronics control unit), and the ECU did not include electronics such as traction control and launch control. 2012 spec bikes were run during the end of the 2011 season, with MSS Colchester Kawasaki's Gary Mason and Team WFR's James Westmoreland running the bikes for 3 and 2 rounds respectively.

== Calendar ==
2012 Calendar
Main Season
| Round | | Circuit | Date | Pole position | Fastest lap | Winning rider | Winning team |
|---|---|---|---|---|---|---|---|
| 1 | R1 | (England) Brands Hatch Indy | 9 April | (Australia) Josh Brookes | (Northern Ireland) Alastair Seeley | (England) Jon Kirkham | Samsung Honda |
| 2 | R1 | (England) Thruxton | 15 April | (England) Tommy Hill | (England) Alex Lowes | (Northern Ireland) Ian Lowry | Padgetts Racing |
| 2 | R2 | (England) Thruxton | 15 April | | (Australia) Josh Brookes | (Australia) Josh Brookes | Tyco Suzuki |
| 3 | R1 | (England) Oulton Park | 6 May ^{1} | | (England) Tommy Hill | (England) Tommy Hill | Swan Yamaha |
| 3 | R2 | (England) Oulton Park | 7 May | (England) Tommy Hill | (England) Graeme Gowland | (England) Chris Walker | Pr1mo Bournemouth Kawasaki |
| 3 | R3 | (England) Oulton Park | 7 May | | (England) Shane Byrne | (England) Shane Byrne | Rapid Solicitors Kawasaki |
| 4 | R1 | (England) Snetterton 300 | 27 May | (Australia) Josh Brookes | (Northern Ireland) Michael Laverty | (England) Tommy Hill | Swan Yamaha |
| 4 | R2 | (England) Snetterton 300 | 27 May | | (Northern Ireland) Michael Laverty | (Northern Ireland) Michael Laverty | Samsung Honda |
| 5 | R1 | (Scotland) Knockhill | 24 June | (England) Tommy Hill | (England) Tommy Hill | (England) Shane Byrne | Rapid Solicitors Kawasaki |
| 5 | R2 | (Scotland) Knockhill | 24 June | | (Northern Ireland) Michael Laverty | (Northern Ireland) Michael Laverty | Samsung Honda |
| 6 | R1 | (England) Oulton Park | 7 July | (England) Tommy Hill | (England) Alex Lowes | (England) Tommy Hill | Swan Yamaha |
| 6 | R2 | (England) Oulton Park | 8 July | | (Australia) Josh Brookes | (England) Tommy Hill | Swan Yamaha |
| 6 | R3 | (England) Oulton Park | 8 July | | (England) Tommy Hill | (England) Tommy Hill | Swan Yamaha |
| 7 | R1 | (England) Brands Hatch GP | 22 July | (England) Shane Byrne | (Australia) Josh Brookes | (England) Shane Byrne | Rapid Solicitors Kawasaki |
| 7 | R2 | (England) Brands Hatch GP | 22 July | | (England) Shane Byrne | (England) Shane Byrne | Rapid Solicitors Kawasaki |
| 8 | R1 | (England) Cadwell Park | 27 August | (England) Alex Lowes | (England) Tommy Hill | (England) Tommy Hill | Swan Yamaha |
| 8 | R2 | (England) Cadwell Park | 27 August | | (England) Alex Lowes | (England) Tommy Hill | Swan Yamaha |
| 9 | R1 | (England) Donington Park | 9 September | (Australia) Josh Brookes | (Australia) Josh Brookes | (Australia) Josh Brookes | Tyco Suzuki |
| 9 | R2 | (England) Donington Park | 9 September | | (Australia) Josh Brookes | (Australia) Josh Brookes | Tyco Suzuki |
The Showdown
| 10 | R1 | (Netherlands) TT Circuit Assen | 23 September | (England) Alex Lowes | (England) Tommy Hill | (England) Shane Byrne | Rapid Solicitors Kawasaki |
| 10 | R2 | (Netherlands) TT Circuit Assen | 23 September | | (Australia) Josh Brookes | (Australia) Josh Brookes | Tyco Suzuki |
| 11 | R1 | (England) Silverstone Arena GP | 30 September | (England) Alex Lowes | (England) Tommy Bridewell | (England) Alex Lowes | Team WFR Honda |
| 11 | R2 | (England) Silverstone Arena GP | 30 September | | (England) Alex Lowes | (England) Alex Lowes | Team WFR Honda |
| 12 | R1 | (England) Brands Hatch GP | 13 October | (England) Alex Lowes | (England) Alex Lowes | (England) Shane Byrne | Rapid Solicitors Kawasaki |
| 12 | R2 | (England) Brands Hatch GP | 14 October | | (Australia) Josh Brookes | (England) Shane Byrne | Rapid Solicitors Kawasaki |
| 12 | R3 | (England) Brands Hatch GP | 14 October | | (Australia) Josh Brookes | (England) Shane Byrne | Rapid Solicitors Kawasaki |

Notes:

1. – The Oulton Park Race1 on 6 May is the rescheduled Brands Hatch Race 2, postponed after track cleanup.
2. – Tommy Hill was demoted 5 places on the grid for having the tyre warmers on the bike after the 3 minute warning.

== Entry list ==
2012 Entry List
| Team | Constructor | Bike | No. | Riders | Rounds |
|---|---|---|---|---|---|
| Swan Yamaha | Yamaha | Yamaha YZF-R1 | 1 | (England) Tommy Hill | All |
| Swan Yamaha | Yamaha | Yamaha YZF-R1 | 41 | (Japan) Noriyuki Haga | All |
| Tyco Suzuki | Suzuki | Suzuki GSX-R1000 | 2 | (Australia) Josh Brookes | All |
| Tyco Suzuki | Suzuki | Suzuki GSX-R1000 | 34 | (Northern Ireland) Alastair Seeley | All |
| Rapid Solicitors Kawasaki | Kawasaki | Kawasaki ZX-10R | 3 | (Scotland) Stuart Easton | 1–4, 7–12 |
| Rapid Solicitors Kawasaki | Kawasaki | Kawasaki ZX-10R | 67 | (England) Shane Byrne | 1–8, 10–12 |
| Rapid Solicitors Kawasaki | Kawasaki | Kawasaki ZX-10R | 303 | (Northern Ireland) Keith Farmer | 6 |
| MSS Bathams Kawasaki | Kawasaki | Kawasaki ZX-10R | 4 | (England) Michael Rutter | All |
| MSS Bathams Kawasaki | Kawasaki | Kawasaki ZX-10R | 60 | (England) Peter Hickman | 1–3 |
| MSS Bathams Kawasaki | Kawasaki | Kawasaki ZX-10R | 83 | (England) Danny Buchan | 6–12 |
| Padgett's Racing | Honda | Honda CBR1000RR | 5 | (Northern Ireland) Ian Lowry | 1–11 |
| Padgett's Racing | Honda | Honda CBR1000RR | 5 | (Australia) Jason O'Halloran | 12 |
| Padgett's Racing | Honda | Honda CBR1000RR | 99 | (Italy) Luca Scassa | All |
| Samsung Honda | Honda | Honda CBR1000RR | 7 | (Northern Ireland) Michael Laverty | All |
| Samsung Honda | Honda | Honda CBR1000RR | 10 | (England) Jon Kirkham | All |
| Hardinge Sorrymate.com Honda | Honda | Honda CBR1000RR | 8 | (England) Jenny Tinmouth | All |
| Pr1mo Bournemouth Kawasaki | Kawasaki | Kawasaki ZX-10R | 9 | (England) Chris Walker | All |
| Pr1mo Bournemouth Kawasaki | Kawasaki | Kawasaki ZX-10R | 14 | (Northern Ireland) John Laverty | 11–12 |
| Pr1mo Bournemouth Kawasaki | Kawasaki | Kawasaki ZX-10R | 28 | (England) Victor Cox | 10 |
| Pr1mo Bournemouth Kawasaki | Kawasaki | Kawasaki ZX-10R | 37 | (England) James Hillier | 1–3, 5, 7 |
| Pr1mo Bournemouth Kawasaki | Kawasaki | Kawasaki ZX-10R | 101 | (England) Gary Mason | 6, 8–9 |
| Moto Rapido Racing | Ducati | Ducati 1199 Panigale | 15 | (Italy) Matteo Baiocco | 11 |
| Moto Rapido Racing | Ducati | Ducati 1199 Panigale | 36 | (Saudi Arabia) Abdulaziz Binladin | 1–8, 10, 12 |
| Moto Rapido Racing | Ducati | Ducati 1199 Panigale | 88 | (England) Scott Smart | All |
| Splitlath-Redmond Racing | Aprilia | Aprilia RSV4 1000 | 14 | (Northern Ireland) John Laverty | 1–9 |
| Splitlath-Redmond Racing | Aprilia | Aprilia RSV4 1000 | 17 | (Australia) Troy Herfoss | 9–11 |
| Splitlath-Redmond Racing | Aprilia | Aprilia RSV4 1000 | 18 | (Australia) Mark Aitchison | 7–9, 12 |
| Splitlath-Redmond Racing | Aprilia | Aprilia RSV4 1000 | 21 | (France) Florian Marino | 1–6 |
| Splitlath-Redmond Racing | Aprilia | Aprilia RSV4 1000 | 96 | (Czech Republic) Jakub Smrž | 10–12 |
| Quattro Plant Kawasaki | Kawasaki | Kawasaki ZX-10R | 18 | (Australia) Mark Aitchison | 6 |
| Quattro Plant Kawasaki | Kawasaki | Kawasaki ZX-10R | 52 | (Australia) Nick Waters | 12 |
| Quattro Plant Kawasaki | Kawasaki | Kawasaki ZX-10R | 68 | (England) Karl Harris | 7–12 |
| Quattro Plant Kawasaki | Kawasaki | Kawasaki ZX-10R | 70 | (England) Tom Grant | 8–11 |
| Quattro Plant Kawasaki | Kawasaki | Kawasaki ZX-10R | 78 | (France) Freddy Foray | 1–3, 5–7 |
| Quattro Plant Kawasaki | Kawasaki | Kawasaki ZX-10R | 101 | (England) Gary Mason | 1–4 |
| Buildbase BMW | BMW | BMW S1000RR | 19 | (England) Dan Linfoot | 1–4 |
| Buildbase BMW | BMW | BMW S1000RR | 60 | (England) Peter Hickman | 5–12 |
| Buildbase BMW | BMW | BMW S1000RR | 77 | (England) Barry Burrell | All |
| Doodson Motorsport Honda | Honda | Honda CBR1000RR | 20 | (England) Tom Tunstall | 5–12 |
| Doodson Motorsport Honda | Honda | Honda CBR1000RR | 25 | (Australia) David Anthony | 6–7 |
| Doodson Motorsport Honda | Honda | Honda CBR1000RR | 127 | (Denmark) Robbin Harms | 8–12 |
| Jentin Doodson Motorsport | Ducati | Ducati 1199 Panigale | 20 | (England) Tom Tunstall | 1–4 |
| Jentin Doodson Motorsport | Ducati | Ducati 1199 Panigale | 53 | (Italy) Alessandro Polita | 1–4 |
| Team WFR | Honda | Honda CBR1000RR | 22 | (England) Alex Lowes | All |
| Team WFR | Honda | Honda CBR1000RR | 27 | (England) James Westmoreland | All |
| Team WFR | Honda | Honda CBR1000RR | 81 | (England) Graeme Gowland | 1–8 |
| Supersonic BMW | BMW | BMW S1000RR | 24 | (Switzerland) Patric Muff | All |
| Supersonic BMW | BMW | BMW S1000RR | 46 | (England) Tommy Bridewell | All |
| GBmoto Racing | Honda | Honda CBR1000RR | 33 | (England) Tristan Palmer | All |
| GBmoto Racing | Honda | Honda CBR1000RR | 51 | (England) Luke Quigley | All |
| Lloyds British | Ducati | Ducati 1199 Panigale | 53 | (Italy) Alessandro Polita | 12 |
| A Plant Suzuki | Suzuki | Suzuki GSX-R1000 | 64 | (England) Aaron Zanotti | All |

Key
Regular Rider
Wildcard Rider
Replacement Rider

== Championship standings ==
=== Riders' Championship ===
(key; bold denotes pole position, italics denotes fastest lap)

| Pos | Rider | Bike | BRH (England) | | THR (England) | | OUL (England) | | | SNE (England) | | KNO (Scotland) | | OUL (England) | | | BRH (England) | | CAD (England) | | DON (England) | | ASS (Netherlands) | | SIL (England) | | BRH (England) | | | Pts |
| Pos | Rider | Bike | R1 | R2 | R1 | R2 | R1 | R2 | R3 | R1 | R2 | R1 | R2 | R1 | R2 | R3 | R1 | R2 | R1 | R2 | R1 | R2 | R1 | R2 | R1 | R2 | R1 | R2 | R3 | Pts |
The Championship Showdown
| 1 | (England) Shane Byrne | Kawasaki | 7 | C | 4 | 3 | 11 | 2 | 1 | Ret | 2 | 1 | 2 | 3 | 3 | 2 | **1** | 1 | DNS | DNS | | | 1 | 2 | 2 | 2 | 1 | 1 | 1 | 683 |
| 2 | (Australia) Josh Brookes | Suzuki | **10** | C | 3 | 1 | 3 | 3 | 4 | **3** | 3 | 4 | 4 | 2 | 2 | **3** | 2 | **2** | 6 | 2 | **1** | **1** | 2 | 1 | 4 | 3 | 3 | 2 | **2** | 655 |
| 3 | (England) Tommy Hill | Yamaha | Ret | C | **2** | 2 | 1 | **4** | 2 | 1 | Ret | **2** | **3** | **1** | 1 | 1 | 3 | 3 | 1 | **1** | 2 | 3 | Ret | 4 | 7 | 7 | 2 | 6 | 3 | 612 |
| 4 | (England) Alex Lowes | Honda | 17 | C | 22 | **8** | DNS | 10 | 10 | 5 | 6 | 9 | 8 | Ret | **9** | 6 | 7 | 6 | **2** | 4 | 6 | 5 | **3** | 3 | **1** | 1 | **Ret** | **Ret** | Ret | 584 |
| 5 | (Northern Ireland) Michael Laverty | Honda | Ret | C | 6 | 13 | 6 | 12 | 7 | 2 | **1** | 3 | 1 | Ret | 4 | 5 | 4 | 4 | 3 | 3 | 3 | 2 | 7 | 7 | 3 | 5 | 10 | 3 | Ret | 581 |
| 6 | (England) Tommy Bridewell | BMW | 6 | C | 11 | 16 | 5 | 7 | 5 | 6 | Ret | 5 | 6 | 6 | 7 | 8 | 5 | 7 | 9 | 5 | 9 | 4 | 6 | 5 | 6 | **4** | 7 | 5 | 4 | 577 |
BSB Riders Cup
| 7 | (England) James Westmoreland | Honda | 8 | C | 9 | 9 | 10 | 14 | 16 | 12 | 9 | 11 | 5 | 5 | 11 | 9 | Ret | 10 | 8 | 6 | 5 | 6 | 8 | 8 | 5 | 9 | 4 | Ret | 6 | 182 |
| 8 | (Japan) Noriyuki Haga | Yamaha | 13 | C | Ret | 10 | 2 | 13 | 6 | 4 | Ret | 6 | Ret | 4 | 5 | 4 | Ret | 5 | DNS | DNS | Ret | 12 | 5 | **6** | 16 | 15 | 8 | 9 | 10 | 160 |
| 9 | (England) Chris Walker | Kawasaki | 12 | C | Ret | 15 | 7 | 1 | 9 | 7 | 7 | Ret | Ret | 7 | 12 | 11 | 6 | Ret | 13 | 11 | 8 | 10 | 15 | 14 | 10 | 8 | Ret | Ret | 9 | 138 |
| 10 | (Scotland) Stuart Easton | Kawasaki | Ret | C | 5 | 4 | 9 | 5 | 3 | Ret | 8 | | | WD | WD | WD | 8 | Ret | 19 | 14 | 4 | 7 | 9 | 10 | Ret | Ret | 5 | 7 | 12 | 135 |
| 11 | (Northern Ireland) Ian Lowry | Honda | 4 | C | 1 | 5 | Ret | 21 | 13 | 8 | 4 | Ret | 10 | Ret | 6 | 7 | Ret | 8 | 12 | 7 | Ret | Ret | 14 | Ret | 9 | 13 | | | | 131 |
| 12 | (England) Jon Kirkham | Honda | 1 | C | 7 | 7 | DNS | DNS | DNS | Ret | 14 | 12 | 14 | Ret | Ret | 14 | 12 | 14 | 5 | 12 | 7 | 9 | 13 | Ret | 12 | 14 | 9 | 8 | 8 | 122 |
| 13 | (Northern Ireland) Alastair Seeley | Suzuki | 2 | C | 15 | 21 | **4** | 6 | 11 | 16 | 16 | 7 | 7 | Ret | 8 | 13 | 9 | 11 | 14 | 13 | DNS | Ret | 19 | 20 | 17 | 18 | 19 | Ret | 19 | 95 |
| 14 | (England) Barry Burrell | BMW | 19 | C | 14 | 17 | 18 | 22 | Ret | 10 | Ret | Ret | 11 | 10 | Ret | 17 | 11 | 13 | 16 | 15 | 10 | 13 | 12 | 12 | 19 | 11 | 6 | 4 | 5 | 84 |
| 15 | (Italy) Luca Scassa | Honda | Ret | C | 8 | 6 | 13 | Ret | 17 | Ret | Ret | 16 | Ret | Ret | Ret | DNS | 14 | 16 | 15 | 17 | 11 | 8 | 4 | 11 | 8 | 6 | Ret | 15 | 14 | 76 |
| 16 | (England) Graeme Gowland | Honda | Ret | C | 10 | 14 | Ret | 15 | **8** | Ret | 5 | 8 | 9 | 9 | 10 | 10 | Ret | 9 | WD | WD | | | | | | | | | | 69 |
| 17 | (England) Peter Hickman | Kawasaki | 16 | C | Ret | 12 | 16 | 11 | Ret | | | | | | | | | | | | | | | | | | | | | 65 |
| 17 | (England) Peter Hickman | BMW | | | | | | | | | | Ret | 13 | 8 | 13 | 12 | Ret | Ret | 10 | 8 | 18 | 15 | Ret | 16 | 14 | 10 | Ret | 10 | 7 | 65 |
| 18 | (Switzerland) Patric Muff | BMW | Ret | C | 16 | 18 | 12 | 8 | 14 | 9 | 10 | 15 | 17 | 11 | 14 | Ret | 15 | 15 | 21 | 16 | 12 | 11 | 11 | 13 | 15 | Ret | 11 | Ret | 13 | 63 |
| 19 | (England) Michael Rutter | Kawasaki | 3 | C | Ret | Ret | 8 | Ret | 15 | 14 | 13 | 10 | Ret | 14 | Ret | 16 | 10 | 17 | 11 | 10 | 22 | 14 | 17 | 19 | 18 | 16 | 13 | 18 | 15 | 61 |
| 20 | (England) Dan Linfoot | BMW | Ret | C | 12 | 11 | 15 | 9 | 12 | 11 | 11 | WD | WD | | | | | | | | | | | | | | | | | 31 |
| 21 | (England) Karl Harris | Kawasaki | | | | | | | | | | | | | | | 13 | 12 | 7 | 9 | DNS | DNS | 18 | Ret | 13 | Ret | 12 | Ret | Ret | 23 |
| 22 | (Denmark) Robbin Harms | Honda | | | | | | | | | | | | | | | | | 23 | 22 | 15 | Ret | 10 | 9 | 11 | Ret | Ret | 12 | Ret | 23 |
| 23 | (England) Luke Quigley | Honda | Ret | C | 21 | Ret | 14 | 16 | 18 | 13 | 12 | 14 | 15 | 12 | 16 | Ret | DNS | DNS | Ret | 21 | 14 | 17 | 21 | 21 | 20 | 21 | Ret | DNS | DNS | 18 |
| 24 | (England) Danny Buchan | Kawasaki | | | | | | | | | | | | | | | 18 | 18 | 4 | Ret | 13 | 18 | 16 | Ret | Ret | 17 | Ret | Ret | 17 | 16 |
| 25 | (England) Gary Mason | Kawasaki | 5 | C | 13 | Ret | DNS | 18 | Ret | Ret | Ret | | | Ret | Ret | 18 | | | 20 | 20 | 20 | Ret | | | | | | | | 14 |
| 26 | (England) Jason O'Halloran | Honda | | | | | | | | | | | | | | | | | | | | | | | | | 16 | 11 | 11 | 10 |
| 27 | (England) Tristan Palmer | Honda | Ret | C | Ret | 19 | 17 | DNS | 22 | 15 | Ret | 13 | 12 | Ret | Ret | DNS | 19 | 23 | 18 | 18 | 18 | 20 | Ret | 22 | DNS | DNS | 17 | Ret | DNS | 8 |
| 28 | (England) Scott Smart | Ducati | 14 | C | 18 | 22 | 19 | Ret | DNS | Ret | 15 | Ret | 16 | 13 | 15 | 15 | 17 | 19 | 17 | 19 | 16 | Ret | 20 | Ret | Ret | 19 | Ret | 16 | 20 | 8 |
| 29 | (Czech Republic) Jakub Smrž | Aprilia | | | | | | | | | | | | | | | | | | | | | Ret | 15 | Ret | 11 | 15 | 15 | 16 | 8 |
| 30 | (France) Freddy Foray | Kawasaki | 9 | C | 20 | Ret | DNS | 19 | Ret | | | 17 | 18 | 16 | 17 | 19 | Ret | DNS | | | | | | | | | | | | 7 |
| 31 | (Italy) Alex Polita | Ducati | 11 | C | 19 | Ret | Ret | 17 | Ret | Ret | DNS | | | | | | | | | | 19 | Ret | | | | | 20 | 17 | Ret | 5 |
| 32 | (Australia) Mark Aitchison | Kawasaki | | | | | | | | | | | | 15 | DNS | DNS | | | | | | | | | | | | | | 3 |
| 32 | (Australia) Mark Aitchison | Aprilia | | | | | | | | | | | | | | | 16 | Ret | Ret | DNS | | | | | | | 14 | Ret | Ret | 3 |
| 33 | (Northern Ireland) John Laverty | Aprilia | 18 | C | 25 | 26 | 20 | 24 | 21 | 18 | 18 | 18 | Ret | Ret | Ret | 22 | 21 | 20 | Ret | DNS | DNS | DNS | | | | | | | | 3 |
| 33 | (Northern Ireland) John Laverty | Kawasaki | | | | | | | | | | | | | | | | | | | | | | | 21 | 20 | 18 | 13 | 18 | 3 |
| 34 | (England) James Hillier | Kawasaki | 15 | C | 17 | 20 | Ret | Ret | 19 | | | Ret | DNS | | | | Ret | Ret | | | | | | | | | | | | 1 |
| | (England) Aaron Zanotti | Suzuki | 21 | C | 24 | 23 | 21 | 20 | 20 | 17 | 17 | DNS | DNS | 18 | Ret | Ret | 20 | 21 | Ret | 23 | 24 | 22 | DNS | 24 | 24 | 23 | DNS | DNS | DNS | 0 |
| | (France) Florian Marino | Aprilia | Ret | C | Ret | 24 | 22 | Ret | Ret | Ret | Ret | 19 | 19 | 17 | 19 | 21 | | | | | | | | | | | | | | 0 |
| | (Australia) Troy Herfoss | Aprilia | | | | | | | | | | | | | | | | | | | DNS | DNS | Ret | 18 | 21 | 22 | | | | 0 |
| | (Australia) David Anthony | Honda | | | | | | | | | | | | Ret | 18 | 23 | DNS | DNS | | | | | | | | | | | | 0 |
| | (England) Jenny Tinmouth | Honda | Ret | C | 26 | 27 | 24 | DNS | DNS | 19 | 19 | 20 | 20 | 20 | 21 | Ret | 22 | Ret | Ret | Ret | 25 | 24 | Ret | 25 | 25 | 25 | 23 | 21 | 23 | 0 |
| | (England) Tom Tunstall | Ducati | 20 | C | 23 | 25 | 23 | 23 | 23 | DNS | DNS | | | | | | | | | | | | | | | | | | | 0 |
| | (England) Tom Tunstall | Honda | | | | | | | | | | Ret | Ret | 19 | 20 | Ret | Ret | 22 | 22 | Ret | 23 | 21 | Ret | DNS | 23 | 24 | 22 | 19 | 22 | 0 |
| | (Saudi Arabia) Abdulaziz Binladin | Ducati | Ret | C | Ret | Ret | DNS | DNS | DNS | 20 | Ret | 21 | Ret | 21 | Ret | Ret | Ret | Ret | DNS | DNS | | | DNS | DNS | | | Ret | Ret | DNS | 0 |
| | (Australia) Nick Waters | Kawasaki | | | | | | | | | | | | | | | | | | | | | | | | | 21 | 20 | 21 | 0 |
| | (Northern Ireland) Keith Farmer | Kawasaki | | | | | | | | | | | | Ret | DNS | 20 | | | | | | | | | | | | | | 0 |
| | (England) Tom Grant | Kawasaki | | | | | | | | | | | | | | | | | Ret | Ret | DNS | 23 | Ret | 23 | WD | WD | | | | 0 |
| | (England) Victor Cox | Kawasaki | | | | | | | | | | | | | | | | | | | | | Ret | Ret | | | | | | 0 |
| | (Italy) Matteo Baiocco | Ducati | | | | | | | | | | | | | | | | | | | | | | | Ret | Ret | | | | 0 |
| Pos | Rider | Bike | BRH (England) | | THR (England) | | OUL (England) | | | SNE (England) | | KNO (Scotland) | | OUL (England) | | | BRH (England) | | CAD (England) | | DON (England) | | ASS (Netherlands) | | SIL (England) | | BRH (England) | | | Pts |

| Colour | Result |
|---|---|
| Gold | Winner |
| Silver | Second place |
| Bronze | Third place |
| Green | Points classification |
| Blue | Non-points classification |
| Blue | Non-classified finish (NC) |
| Purple | Retired, not classified (Ret) |
| Red | Did not qualify (DNQ) |
| Red | Did not pre-qualify (DNPQ) |
| Black | Disqualified (DSQ) |
| White | Did not start (DNS) |
| White | Withdrew (WD) |
| White | Race cancelled (C) |
| Blank | Did not practice (DNP) |
| Blank | Did not arrive (DNA) |
| Blank | Excluded (EX) |

=== Manufacturers' standings ===
| Pos | Manufacturer | BRH (England) | | THR (England) | | OUL (England) | | | SNE (England) | | KNO (Scotland) | | OUL (England) | | | BRH (England) | | CAD (England) | | DON (England) | | ASS (Netherlands) | | SIL (England) | | BRH (England) | | | Pts |
| Pos | Manufacturer | R1 | R2 | R1 | R2 | R1 | R2 | R3 | R1 | R2 | R1 | R2 | R1 | R2 | R3 | R1 | R2 | R1 | R2 | R1 | R2 | R1 | R2 | R1 | R2 | R1 | R2 | R3 | Pts |
|---|---|---|---|---|---|---|---|---|---|---|---|---|---|---|---|---|---|---|---|---|---|---|---|---|---|---|---|---|---|
| 1 | Kawasaki | 3 | C | 4 | 3 | 7 | 1 | 1 | 7 | 2 | 1 | 2 | 3 | 3 | 2 | 1 | 1 | 4 | 9 | 4 | 7 | 1 | 2 | 2 | 2 | 1 | 1 | 1 | 482 |
| 2 | Suzuki | 2 | C | 3 | 1 | 3 | 3 | 4 | 3 | 3 | 4 | 4 | 2 | 2 | 3 | 2 | 2 | 6 | 2 | 1 | 1 | 2 | 1 | 4 | 3 | 3 | 2 | 2 | 470 |
| 3 | Yamaha | 13 | C | 2 | 2 | 1 | 4 | 2 | 1 | Ret | 2 | 3 | 1 | 1 | 1 | 3 | 3 | 1 | 1 | 2 | 3 | 5 | 4 | 7 | 7 | 2 | 6 | 3 | 443 |
| 4 | Honda | 1 | C | 1 | 5 | 6 | 10 | 7 | 2 | 1 | 3 | 1 | 5 | 4 | 5 | 4 | 4 | 2 | 3 | 3 | 2 | 3 | 3 | 1 | 1 | 4 | 3 | 6 | 426 |
| 5 | BMW | 6 | C | 11 | 11 | 5 | 7 | 5 | 6 | 10 | 5 | 6 | 6 | 7 | 8 | 5 | 7 | 9 | 5 | 9 | 4 | 6 | 5 | 6 | 4 | 6 | 4 | 4 | 253 |
| 6 | Aprilia | 18 | C | 25 | 24 | 20 | 24 | 21 | 18 | 18 | 18 | 19 | 17 | 19 | 21 | 16 | 20 | Ret | DNS | DNS | 19 | Ret | 15 | 21 | 11 | 14 | 14 | 16 | 9 |
| 7 | Ducati | 11 | C | 18 | 22 | 19 | 17 | 23 | 20 | 15 | 21 | 16 | 13 | 15 | 15 | 17 | 19 | 17 | 19 | 16 | Ret | 20 | Ret | Ret | 19 | 20 | 16 | 20 | 8 |
| Pos | Manufacturer | BRH (England) | | THR (England) | | OUL (England) | | | SNE (England) | | KNO (Scotland) | | OUL (England) | | | BRH (England) | | CAD (England) | | DON (England) | | ASS (Netherlands) | | SIL (England) | | BRH (England) | | | Pts |
