= 2006 British Superbike Championship =

British motorcycle racing season

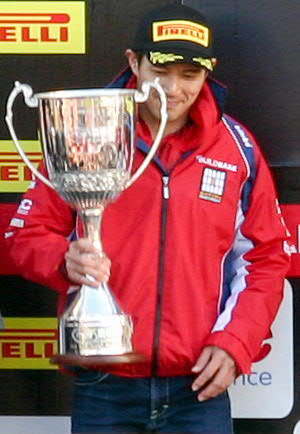
2006 champion, Ryuichi Kiyonari

The 2006 British Superbike season was held from 24 March to 30 September. Ryuichi Kiyonari became the 2006 BSB Champion onboard a HM Plant Racing HRC Honda CBR1000RR.

== Races ==
Round	Date	Circuit	British Superbike winner	British Supersport winner	National Superstock winner	National Superstock; Cup winner	British 125GP winner	Virgin Mobile Cup winner
1	24–26 March	Brands Hatch	(Spain) Gregorio Lavilla	(Scotland) Stuart Easton	(England) Craig Fitzpatrick	(England) Kenny Gilbertson	(England) Dan Linfoot	(England) Matthew Whitman
1	24–26 March	Brands Hatch	(Japan) Ryuichi Kiyonari	(Scotland) Stuart Easton	(England) Craig Fitzpatrick	(England) Kenny Gilbertson	(England) Dan Linfoot	(England) Matthew Whitman
2	7–9 April	Donington Park	(Spain) Gregorio Lavilla	(England) Cal Crutchlow	(Australia) Brendan Roberts	(England) Bob Collins	(England) Robbie Stewart	(England) Matthew Whitman
2	7–9 April	Donington Park	(England) Scott Smart	(England) Cal Crutchlow	(Australia) Brendan Roberts	(England) Bob Collins	(England) Robbie Stewart	(England) Matthew Whitman
3	14–17 April	Thruxton	(Spain) Gregorio Lavilla	(Northern Ireland) Eugene Laverty	(South Africa) Hudson Kennaugh	(England) Bob Collins	(England) Brain Clark	(England) Tom Grant
3	14–17 April	Thruxton	(Spain) Gregorio Lavilla	(Northern Ireland) Eugene Laverty	(South Africa) Hudson Kennaugh	(England) Bob Collins	(England) Brain Clark	(England) Tom Grant
4	29 April – 1 May	Oulton Park	(Spain) Gregorio Lavilla	(Northern Ireland) Eugene Laverty	(Australia) Brendan Roberts	(England) Bob Collins	(England) Dan Linfoot	(England) Matthew Whitman
4	29 April – 1 May	Oulton Park	(Spain) Gregorio Lavilla	(Northern Ireland) Eugene Laverty	(Australia) Brendan Roberts	(England) Bob Collins	(England) Dan Linfoot	(England) Matthew Whitman
5	19–21 May	Mondello Park	All racing cancelled due to torrential rain.					
6	June 2–4	Mallory Park	(Japan) Ryuichi Kiyonari	(England) Cal Crutchlow			(England) James Westmoreland	(England) Tom Grant
6	June 2–4	Mallory Park	(Spain) Gregorio Lavilla	(England) Cal Crutchlow			(England) James Westmoreland	(England) Tom Grant
7	16–18 June	Snetterton	(Japan) Ryuichi Kiyonari	(Northern Ireland) Eugene Laverty	(England) Luke Quigley	(England) Martin Buckles	(England) Daniel Cooper	(England) James Webb
7	16–18 June	Snetterton	(Japan) Ryuichi Kiyonari	(Northern Ireland) Eugene Laverty	(England) Luke Quigley	(England) Martin Buckles	(England) Daniel Cooper	(England) James Webb
-	1-2 June	Donington Park			(Northern Ireland) Adrian Coates			(England) Tom Grant
-	1-2 June	Donington Park			(Australia) Brendan Roberts			(England) Matthew Whitman
8	14–16 July	Knockhill	(Japan) Ryuichi Kiyonari	(England) Cal Crutchlow	(Australia) Brendan Roberts	(England) Martin Buckles	(England) James Westmoreland	(England) David Paton
8	14–16 July	Knockhill	(England) Shane Byrne	(England) Cal Crutchlow	(Australia) Brendan Roberts	(England) James Storrar	(England) James Westmoreland	(England) David Paton
9	21–23 July	Oulton Park	(Japan) Ryuichi Kiyonari	(England) Cal Crutchlow	(Australia) Brendan Roberts	(England) Martin Buckles	(England) Sam Lowes	(England) Tom Grant
9	21–23 July	Oulton Park	(Japan) Ryuichi Kiyonari	(England) Cal Crutchlow	(Australia) Brendan Roberts	(England) Martin Buckles	(England) Sam Lowes	(England) Tom Grant
10	11–13 August	Croft	(Japan) Ryuichi Kiyonari	(England) Sean Emmett	(Australia) Brendan Roberts	(England) Kenny Gilbertson	(England) Daniel Cooper	(England) Graeme Gowland
10	11–13 August	Croft	(England) Leon Haslam	(England) Sean Emmett	(Australia) Brendan Roberts	(England) Kenny Gilbertson	(England) Daniel Cooper	(England) Graeme Gowland
11	26–28 August	Cadwell Park	(Spain) Gregorio Lavilla	(Northern Ireland) Eugene Laverty	(England) Luke Quigley	(England) Martin Buckles	(England) Luke Jones	(England) Graeme Gowland
11	26–28 August	Cadwell Park	(England) Leon Haslam	(Northern Ireland) Eugene Laverty	(England) Luke Quigley	(England) Bob Collins	(England) Luke Jones	(England) Graeme Gowland
12	15–17 September	Silverstone	(Japan) Ryuichi Kiyonari	(England) Cal Crutchlow	(England) Luke Quigley	(England) Martin Buckles	(England) Daniel Cooper	(England) James Webb
12	15–17 September	Silverstone	(Japan) Ryuichi Kiyonari	(England) Cal Crutchlow	(England) Luke Quigley	(England) Martin Buckles	(England) Daniel Cooper	(England) James Webb
13	29 September – 1 October	Brands Hatch	(Japan) Ryuichi Kiyonari	(England) Cal Crutchlow	(England) Guy Sanders	(England) Bob Collins	(England) Daniel Cooper	(England) Graeme Gowland
13	29 September – 1 October	Brands Hatch	(England) Leon Haslam	(England) Cal Crutchlow	(England) Guy Sanders	(England) Bob Collins	(England) Daniel Cooper	(England) Graeme Gowland

== Entry list ==
2006 Entry List
Team	Manufacturer	Bike	No	Riders	Class	Rounds
Airwaves Ducati	Ducati	Ducati 999 F06	1	(Spain) Gregorio Lavilla		All
Airwaves Ducati	Ducati	Ducati 999 F06	91	(England) Leon Haslam		All
Chapman Racing	Honda	Honda CBR1000RR	30	(England) Gareth Glynn	C	1–7
HM Plant Honda	Honda	Honda CBR1000RR	2	(Japan) Ryuichi Kiyonari		All
HM Plant Honda	Honda	Honda CBR1000RR	9	(England) Karl Harris		All
Mark Johns Motors	Honda	Honda CBR1000RR	43	(England) Howie Mainwaring	C	7–13
Nutttravel.com Racing	Honda	Honda CBR1000RR	77	(Northern Ireland) Marty Nutt	C	1–5
Paul Barron Racing	Honda	Honda CBR1000RR	27	(Republic of Ireland) Paul Barron		5
PR Branson Honda	Honda	Honda CBR1000RR	68	(Australia) Chris Martin	C	All
Quay Garage Racing	Honda	Honda CBR1000RR	56	(England) James Buckingham	C	2–9
Red Bull Honda	Honda	Honda CBR1000RR	65	(Northern Ireland) Jonathan Rea		All
Slingshot SMT Racing	Honda	Honda CBR1000RR	42	(England) Dean Ellison		1–9, 12–13
Stobart Motorsport	Honda	Honda CBR1000RR	3	(England) Michael Rutter		All
Stobart Motorsport	Honda	Honda CBR1000RR	33	(Northern Ireland) Michael Laverty		All
Team CSR	Honda	Honda CBR1000RR	14	(England) Craig Sproston	C	2–10, 12–13
Team Hydrex Honda	Honda	Honda CBR1000RR	5	(England) Gary Mason		1–12
Team Hydrex Honda	Honda	Honda CBR1000RR	12	(Australia) Dean Thomas		13
Team Hydrex Honda	Honda	Honda CBR1000RR	75	(Australia) Glen Richards		All
Team JJL Racing	Honda	Honda CBR1000RR	4	(England) Sean Emmett		7
Team JJL Racing	Honda	Honda CBR1000RR	4	(England) Steve Plater		3–6
Team JJL Racing	Honda	Honda CBR1000RR	4	(England) Danny Beaumont		8, 10
Team JJL Racing	Honda	Honda CBR1000RR	37	(England) Danny Beaumont		1–2
CSI Superbike Team	Kawasaki	Kawasaki ZX-10R	10	(England) Jon Kirkham		12–13
DH Racing	Kawasaki	Kawasaki ZX-10R	38	(England) Damien Haywood	C	1–3, 7, 13
Dienza Performance	Kawasaki	Kawasaki ZX-10R	4	(England) Steve Plater		1–2
Dienza Performance	Kawasaki	Kawasaki ZX-10R	10	(England) Jon Kirkham		10–11
Dienza Performance	Kawasaki	Kawasaki ZX-10R	37	(England) Danny Beaumont		3–4, 6
Dienza Performance	Kawasaki	Kawasaki ZX-10R	44	(Australia) David Johnson		9
Hawk Kawasaki	Kawasaki	Kawasaki ZX-10R	12	(Australia) Dean Thomas		1–7, 10–12
Hawk Kawasaki	Kawasaki	Kawasaki ZX-10R	41	(Australia) Craig Coxhell		All
Hawk Kawasaki	Kawasaki	Kawasaki ZX-10R	60	(England) Peter Hickman		All
Ipone Racing	Kawasaki	Kawasaki ZX-10R	6	(England) Sean Emmett		1–3
JJ Racing	Kawasaki	Kawasaki ZX-10R	45	(England) Kenny Everest		1
MAR Racing Kawasaki	Kawasaki	Kawasaki ZX-10R	94	(England) Malcolm Ashley	C	1–3 (Note: Michael Howarth competed in the two friday practice session during round 1, before being replaced by Malcolm Ashley for the rest of the weekend.)
MAR Racing Kawasaki	Kawasaki	Kawasaki ZX-10R	94	(England) Michael Howarth	C	1, 4–13
Medd Racing	Kawasaki	Kawasaki ZX-10R	48	(England) Nick Medd		1–2, 4, 6–8, 10–12
STP Kawasaki	Kawasaki	Kawasaki ZX-10R	6	(Australia) David Johnson	C	13
Alpha Chemicals	Suzuki	Suzuki GSX-R1000	21	(England) Rob Elsmere	C	13
Irish Bike	Suzuki	Suzuki GSX-R1000	19	(Northern Ireland) Alastair Seeley		5
Jentin Racing	Suzuki	Suzuki GSX-R1000	10	(England) Jon Kirkham		1–3
M Hamilton Racing	Suzuki	Suzuki GSX-R1000	99	(Northern Ireland) Marshall Neill	C	12–13
NuttTravel.com Racing	Suzuki	Suzuki GSX-R1000	77	(Northern Ireland) Marty Nutt	C	6–8, 10–13
Protec Racing	Suzuki	Suzuki GSX-R1000	43	(England) Howie Mainwaring	C	1–5
Quay Garage Racing	Suzuki	Suzuki GSX-R1000	56	(England) James Buckingham	C	1
Rizla Suzuki	Suzuki	Suzuki GSX-R1000	10	(England) Jon Kirkham		7 (Note: Shane Byrne competed in the first friday practice session during round 7, before being replaced by Jon Kirkham for the rest of the weekend.)
Rizla Suzuki	Suzuki	Suzuki GSX-R1000	11	(England) James Haydon		1–7, 12–13
Rizla Suzuki	Suzuki	Suzuki GSX-R1000	67	(England) Shane Byrne		All
Rizla Suzuki	Suzuki	Suzuki GSX-R1000	99	(England) Steve Plater		9–11
Scuderia Stellare	Suzuki	Suzuki GSX-R1000	10	(England) Jon Kirkham		4–8 (Note: Jon Kirkham competed in both friday and saturday practice session for Scuderia Stellare during round 7, he was later switched to the Rizla Suzuki squad replacing Shane Byrne for the rest of the weekend. With no replacement, Scuderia Stellare withdrew from the rest of the weekends.)
Vivaldi Racing	Suzuki	Suzuki GSX-R1000	15	(England) Ben Wilson		All
Vivaldi Racing	Suzuki	Suzuki GSX-R1000	46	(England) Ollie Bridewell		All
Vivaldi Racing	Suzuki	Suzuki GSX-R1000	88	(England) Scott Smart		1–10, 12–13
Zakspeed Racing	Suzuki	Suzuki GSX-R1000	21	(England) Zak Barry	C	1–2
Jentin Racing	Yamaha	Yamaha YZF-R1	17	(Northern Ireland) Simon Andrews		7, 9–10, 12–13
Jentin Racing	Yamaha	Yamaha YZF-R1	17	(England) Steve Brogan		4
Virgin Mobile Yamaha	Yamaha	Yamaha YZF-R1	8	(England) Tommy Hill		All
Virgin Mobile Yamaha	Yamaha	Yamaha YZF-R1	16	(Australia) Billy McConnell		All
Virgin Mobile Yamaha	Yamaha	Yamaha YZF-R1	74	(England) Kieran Clarke		1–10

Icon	Class
C	Privateers Cup

Key
Regular Rider
Wildcard Rider
Replacement Rider

== Championship Standings ==
Points system
Position	1st	2nd	3rd	4th	5th	6th	7th	8th	9th	10th	11th	12th	13th	14th	15th
Race	25	20	16	13	11	10	9	8	7	6	5	4	3	2	1

=== British Superbike Championship ===
Pos	Rider	Bike	BHI (England)		DON (England)		THR (England)		OUL (England)		MON (Republic of Ireland)		MAL (England)		SNE (England)		KNO (Scotland)		OUL (England)		CRO (England)		CAD (England)		SIL (England)		BHGP (England)		Pts
Pos	Rider	Bike	R1	R2	R1	R2	R1	R2	R1	R2	R1	R2	R1	R2	R1	R2	R1	R2	R1	R2	R1	R2	R1	R2	R1	R2	R1	R2	Pts
1	(Japan) Ryuichi Kiyonari	Honda	4	1	2	Ret	3	4	6	5	C	C	1	3	1	1	1	Ret	1	1	1	5	3	Ret	1	1	1	2	466
2	(England) Leon Haslam	Ducati	Ret	2	3	2	2	2	3	7	C	C	2	2	2	2	3	3	2	3	4	1	2	1	Ret	3	2	1	458
3	(Spain) Gregorio Lavilla	Ducati	1	3	1	3	1	1	1	1	C	C	3	1	3	Ret	11	Ret	3	Ret	3	3	1	2	2	2	Ret	Ret	377
4	(Northern Ireland) Jonathan Rea	Honda	5	Ret	8	5	4	5	8	4	C	C	Ret	8	4	20	4	2	5	4	2	13	Ret	3	4	5	18	3	248
5	(England) Karl Harris	Honda	2	5	6	Ret	Ret	3	5	2	C	C	7	4	Ret	DNS	7	6	Ret	2	10	2	10	5	3	6	Ret	4	244
6	(England) Shane Byrne	Suzuki	6	11	5	DNS	5	8	2	3	C	C	4	5	WD	WD	2	1	4	5	5	4	4	Ret	Ret	4	Ret	DNS	224
7	(England) Michael Rutter	Honda	3	Ret	7	Ret	6	7	9	6	C	C	6	6	7	Ret	13	10	6	7	6	6	Ret	Ret	5	7	3	8	206
8	(England) Tommy Hill	Yamaha	Ret	6	Ret	6	8	9	7	8	C	C	12	11	6	3	8	4	Ret	6	7	Ret	5	4	6	Ret	4	Ret	187
9	(Northern Ireland) Michael Laverty	Honda	7	Ret	4	7	10	11	11	11	C	C	5	7	5	4	5	5	7	Ret	13	7	12	7	Ret	11	Ret	5	179
10	(Australia) Glen Richards	Honda	9	9	Ret	12	7	Ret	10	9	C	C	Ret	10	13	8	9	8	Ret	8	Ret	9	6	9	9	12	5	9	151
11	(Australia) Dean Thomas	Kawasaki	8	8	9	Ret	9	6	12	Ret	C	C	8	9	11	Ret					12	12	8	11	8	8			109
11	(Australia) Dean Thomas	Honda																									11	13	109
12	(England) Ben Wilson	Suzuki	12	13	12	11	Ret	13	14	10	C	C	10	Ret	10	Ret	12	11	Ret	9	Ret	18	11	8	7	10	7	10	98
13	(Australia) Craig Coxhell	Kawasaki	18	4	11	Ret	DNS	DNS	17	15	C	C	9	14	12	5	6	9	10	13	8	10	7	17	Ret	14	DNS	Ret	94
14	(England) Scott Smart	Suzuki	14	16	10	1	11	10	13	13	C	C	17	16	Ret	7	10	7	8	Ret	WD	WD					6	Ret	92
15	(England) James Haydon	Suzuki	10	7	Ret	Ret	Ret	Ret	4	17	C	C	WD	WD	8	Ret									Ret	9	9	6	57
16	(England) Gary Mason	Honda	11	14	13	4	17	12	Ret	14	C	C	11	13	Ret	13	14	17	12	10	18	Ret	Ret	12	DNS	DNS			55
17	(England) Billy McConnell	Yamaha	17	Ret	14	Ret	12	Ret	18	Ret	C	C	Ret	12	9	Ret	18	15	9	Ret	Ret	Ret	Ret	10	Ret	13	12	7	47
18	(England) Peter Hickman	Kawasaki	21	17	Ret	16	18	Ret	19	20	C	C	14	19	14	10	17	16	14	16	14	8	14	15	10	15	16	11	37
19	(England) Steve Plater	Honda					13	14	Ret	Ret	C	C	Ret	DNS															37
19	(England) Steve Plater	Kawasaki	DNQ	DNQ	DNS	DNS																							37
19	(England) Steve Plater	Suzuki																	11	11	9	11	Ret	6					37
20	(England) Ollie Bridewell	Suzuki	15	10	17	8	Ret	Ret	24	18	C	C	20	17	18	Ret	19	14	Ret	12	Ret	16	Ret	13	11	21	17	12	33
21	(England) Chris Martin	Honda	19	21	Ret	9	19	17	21	21	C	C	13	20	15	6	21	19	16	17	16	15	WD	WD	15	20	10	14	31
22	(England) Jon Kirkham	Kawasaki																			19	14	9	14	Ret	16	Ret	Ret	28
22	(England) Jon Kirkham	Suzuki	16	12	Ret	DNS	16	16	15	12	C	C	Ret	15	Ret	9	Ret	DNS											28
23	(England) Simon Andrews	Yamaha													Ret	Ret			13	15	11	Ret			Ret	Ret	8	17	17
24	(England) James Buckingham	Honda			15	13	15	15	16	16	C	C	Ret	18	Ret	12	15	13	Ret	Ret									14
24	(England) James Buckingham	Suzuki	WD	WD																									14
25	(England) Kieran Clarke	Yamaha	Ret	Ret	Ret	Ret	14	Ret	Ret	19	C	C	Ret	DNS	16	11	16	12	15	14	17	Ret							14
26	(Northern Ireland) Marty Nutt	Honda	20	15	19	Ret	20	19	20	DNS	C	C																	13
26	(Northern Ireland) Marty Nutt	Suzuki											18	22	19	14	WD	WD			15	Ret	13	18	13	19	13	Ret	13
27	(England) Malcolm Ashley	Kawasaki	23	19	18	10	Ret	Ret																					6
28	(England) Dean Ellison	Honda	DNQ	DNQ	16	14	Ret	Ret	Ret	22	C	C	16	21	17	21	20	18	DNS	DNS					14	18	14	Ret	6
29	(Northern Ireland) Marshall Neill	Suzuki																							12	17	DNS	DNS	4
30	(England) Sean Emmett	Kawasaki	13	Ret	Ret	Ret	Ret	Ret																					3
30	(England) Sean Emmett	Honda													Ret	Ret													3
31	(England) Howie Mainwaring	Suzuki	DNQ	DNQ	Ret	15	21	Ret	23	Ret	WD	WD																	2
31	(England) Howie Mainwaring	Honda													21	15	22	20	17	18	20	19	16	Ret	16	22	Ret	16	2
32	(Australia) David Johnson	Kawasaki																	18	19							15	15	2
33	(England) Gareth Glynn	Honda	22	20	DNS	DNS	22	18	Ret	Ret	C	C	15	Ret	20	Ret													1
34	(England) Nick Medd	Kawasaki	DNQ	DNQ	Ret	Ret			Ret	Ret			DNQ	DNQ	Ret	17	DNS	DNS			22	Ret	15	Ret	WD	WD			1
	(England) Danny Beaumont	Honda	Ret	DNS	Ret	Ret											Ret	Ret			WD	WD							0
	(England) Danny Beaumont	Kawasaki					Ret	20	Ret	DNS			DNS	DNS															0
	(England) Zak Barry	Suzuki	Ret	18	WD	WD																							0
	(England) Craig Sproston	Yamaha			20	Ret	23	21	DNQ	DNQ	DNQ	DNQ	DNQ	DNQ	24	19	24	22	20	21	23	20			17	Ret	DNQ	DNQ	0
	(England) Steve Brogan	Yamaha							22	Ret																			0
	(England) Michael Howarth	Kawasaki	WD	WD					Ret	Ret	DNQ	DNQ	19	23	23	18	23	21	19	20	21	17	Ret	16	Ret	23	Ret	18	0
	(England) Damien Haywood	Kawasaki	DNQ	DNQ	DNQ	DNQ	DNQ	DNQ							22	16											Ret	DNS	0
	(Republic of Ireland) Paul Barron	Honda									C	C																	
	(England) Rob Elsmere	Suzuki																									DNQ	DNQ	
	(England) Kenny Everest	Kawasaki	DNQ	DNQ																									
Pos	Rider	Bike	BHI (England)		DON (England)		THR (England)		OUL (England)		MON (Republic of Ireland)		MAL (England)		SNE (England)		KNO (Scotland)		OUL (England)		CRO (England)		CAD (England)		SIL (England)		BHGP (England)		Pts

Colour	Result
Gold	Winner
Silver	Second place
Bronze	Third place
Green	Points classification
Blue	Non-points classification
Blue	Non-classified finish (NC)
Purple	Retired, not classified (Ret)
Red	Did not qualify (DNQ)
Red	Did not pre-qualify (DNPQ)
Black	Disqualified (DSQ)
White	Did not start (DNS)
White	Withdrew (WD)
White	Race cancelled (C)
Blank	Did not practice (DNP)
Blank	Did not arrive (DNA)
Blank	Excluded (EX)

=== British Supersport Championship ===
Place	Rider	Number	Country	Machine	Points	Wins
1	(United Kingdom) Cal Crutchlow	35	United Kingdom	Honda	242	6
2	(United Kingdom) Tom Sykes	36	United Kingdom	Suzuki	172	0
3	(United Kingdom) Eugene Laverty	50	United Kingdom	Honda	152	4
4	(United Kingdom) Leon Camier	1	United Kingdom	Honda	112	0
5	(United Kingdom) Dennis Hobbs	25	United Kingdom	Honda	105	0
6	(United Kingdom) Stuart Easton	3	United Kingdom	Ducati	84	1
7	(Spain) Pere Riba	5	Spain	Kawasaki	73	0
8	(United Kingdom) Jamie Robinson	77	United Kingdom	Honda	71	0
9	(United Kingdom) Ian Lowry	6	United Kingdom	Suzuki	59	0
10	(United Kingdom) Kieran Murphy	4	United Kingdom	Kawasaki	59	0

=== National Superstock Championship ===
Place	Rider	Number	Country	Machine	Points	Wins
1	(Australia) Brendan Roberts	24	Australia	Suzuki	216	6
2	(United Kingdom) Aaron Zanotti	64	United Kingdom	Suzuki	141	1
3	(United Kingdom) Luke Quigley	51	United Kingdom	Suzuki	138	3
4	(United Kingdom) Lee Jackson	1	United Kingdom	Kawasaki	126	0
5	(United Kingdom) John Laverty	14	United Kingdom	Suzuki	118	0
6	(United Kingdom) Ian Hutchinson	8	United Kingdom	Suzuki	100	0
7	(United Kingdom) Adam Jenkinson	11	United Kingdom	Suzuki	94	0
8	(United Kingdom) Marshall Neill	9	United Kingdom	Suzuki	90	0
9	(United Kingdom) John McGuinness	4	United Kingdom	Honda	83	0
10	(United Kingdom) Tristan Palmer	5	United Kingdom	Suzuki	80	0

== Reference List ==
Michael Scott. Motocourse 2006-2007: The World's Leading MotoGP & Superbike Annual. Hazelton Publishing. ISBN 978-1905334162.
