= Lee Johnston (motorcyclist) =

Northern Irish motorcyclist (born 1989)

- Born: Lee Johnston; 10 March 1989 (age 37); Maguiresbridge, County Fermanagh, Northern Ireland
- Current team: Sencat by Swan Racing
- Bike number: 13
Motorcycle racing career statistics
British Supersport Championship
Active years	2009–2011, 2020–2026
Manufacturers	Triumph
2025 championship position	13th
Starts / Wins / Podiums / Poles / F. laps / Points; 89 / 2 / 14 / 5 / 7 / 777
Isle of Man TT career
TTs contested	9
Active years	2011–2022
TT wins	1

Lee Johnston (born March 10 1989) is a motorcycle racer from Maguiresbridge, County Fermanagh, Northern Ireland who currently competes in the British Supersport Championship for Sencat by Swan Racing. He is a successful road racer, having won the North West 200 five times and 2019 Isle of Man TT in the Supersport class.

== Career ==
=== Early career ===
Johnston first began competing in motorcycle racing as a teenager, winning national championships on Minimoto bikes. He then moved British Superstock, originally in the National Superstock 1000 class and then National Superstock 600, winning the latter category in 2008.

Johnston graduated to the main British Supersport Championship in 2009, and finished 12th overall in the standings with a best result of fifth. For the 2010 season, he contested all but one round of the championship and finished in 13th place. In 2011, he signed a deal with East Coast Construction team, and finished the season in 16th place. Following the 2011 season, Johnston moved primarily to road racing.

=== Road racing ===
Johnston first competed in road racing in 2011, when East Coast Construction invited him to North West 200, Isle of Man TT and Ulster Grand Prix, taking a podium in the latter. He competed in the three races for the following eight years, switching to a Honda bike in 2017, on which he finished second at the 2017 North West 200. The following year, he moved back to Yamaha, with East Coast Construction now known as Ashcourt Racing, and won the North West 200. In 2019, he achieved his first victory at the Isle of Man TT in the Supersport race.

Major road races were cancelled in 2020 and 2021 due to the COVID-19 pandemic.

During practice for the 2023 North West 200, Johnston crashed heavily and sustained serious injuries, including a broken femur, shoulder and ribs, along with a collapsed lung. In 2025, BBC released a film titled Ride or Die which partially focused on Johnston's accident and recovery.

Johnston attempted to return to road racing in 2024, but broke his leg during testing in Spain. This left him unable to compete in both the North West 200 and the Isle of Man TT. However, he was able to recover in time for the Manx Grand Prix in August, competing in the Lightweight class, and finished in second place.

Johnston chose not to return to the North West 200 and Isle of Man TT in 2025, instead focusing on his British Supersport campaign, although he did participate in BBC Northern Ireland's coverage of both events.

=== Return to British Supersport Championship ===
Johnston returned to the British Supersport Championship in 2020. Towards the end of the season, he began to struggle with ankylosing spondylitis, a spinal condition that causes inflammation.

In 2023, Johnston was leading the championship standings when he suffered severe injuries during the North West 200, which meant he was unable to compete in the remainder of the season. He finished 17th in the standings with two wins.

In September 2024, Johnston returned to the series following recovery from his 2023 injuries, competing in the final three rounds of the championship. In the same month, he announced that Ashcourt Racing would withdraw from competition following the end of the season. He finished the year in 15th place in the standings.

Johnston remained in the series for 2025, now competing for Sencat by Swan Racing.

== Career statistics ==
=== Partial British Supersport Championship results ===
(key) (Races in bold indicate pole position; races in italics indicate fastest lap)

Year	Bike	1		2		3		4		5		6		7		8		9		10		11		12			Pos	Pts
2009	Yamaha	BRH1; 5		OUL1; Ret		DON; 9		THR; 9		SNE; DNS		KNO; 5		MAL; Ret		BRH2; Ret		CAD; Ret		CRO; 11		SIL; Ret		OUL2; 5			12th	52
2010	Kawasaki	BRH1; 14		THR; 9		OUL1; Ret		CAD1; 14		MAL		KNO; 16															13th	38
2010	Triumph													SNE; 12		BRH2; Ret		CAD2; Ret		CRO; 7		SIL; 9		OUL2; 9			13th	38
2011	Honda	BRH1; 1; 4	BRH1; 2; 6	OUL1; 1; 5	OUL1; 2 Ret	CRO; 1; 10	CRO; 2; 7	THR; 1	THR; 2	KNO; 1 Ret	KNO; 2 Ret	SNE; 1; 4	SNE; 2; 8	OUL2; 1; 9	OUL2; 2 C	BRH2; 1; 13	BRH2; 2 DNS	CAD; 1	CAD; 2								16th	80
2011	Triumph																			DON; 1 Ret	DON; 2 DNS	SIL; 1	SIL; 2	BRH3; 1	BRH3; 2	BRH3; 3	16th	80
2022	Yamaha	SIL; 1; 2	**SIL**; **2**; 2	OUL1; 1; 3	**OUL1**; **2**; 2	DON1; 1; 4	DON1; 2; 5	KNO; 1 DNS	KNO; 2 DNS	BRH1; 1; 6	BRH1; 2 Ret	THR; 1; 10	THR; 2; 8	CAD; 1	CAD; 2	SNE; 1; 3	SNE; 2; 4	OUL2; 1; 3	OUL2; 2; 2	DON2; 1; 3	**DON2**; **2**; 3	BRH2; 1; 4	BRH2; 2; 2				4th	257
2023	Yamaha	SIL; 1; 1	**SIL**; **2**; 1	OUL1; 1 Ret	OUL1; 2; 6	DON1; 1	DON1; 2	KNO; 1	KNO; 2	SNE; 1	SNE; 2	BRH1; 1	BRH1; 2	THR; 1	THR; 2	CAD; 1	CAD; 2	OUL2; 1	OUL2; 2	DON2; 1	DON2; 2	BRH2; 1	BRH2; 2				17th	64
2024	Triumph	NAV; 1	NAV; 2	OUL1; 1	OUL1; 2	DON1; 1	DON1; 2	KNO; 1	KNO; 2	SNE; 1	SNE; 2	BRH1; 1	BRH1; 2	THR; 1	THR; 2	CAD; 1	CAD; 2	OUL2; 1; 10	OUL2; 2; 12	DON2; 1; 6	DON2; 2; 9	BRH2; 1 Ret	BRH2; 2; 8				15th	48
2025	Triumph	OUL1; 1; 9	OUL1; 2 C	DON1; 1; 12	DON1; 2; 11	SNE; 1; 5	SNE; 2 Ret	KNO; 1	KNO; 2	BRH1; 1	BRH1; 2	THR; 1	THR; 2	CAD; 1	CAD; 2	DON2; 1	DON2; 2	ASS; 1	ASS; 2	OUL2; 1	OUL2; 2	BRH2; 1	BRH2; 2				10th*	33*

* Season still in progress

=== European Superstock 600 ===
==== Races by year ====
(key) (Races in bold indicate pole position, races in italics indicate fastest lap)

Year	Bike	1	2	3	4	5	6	7	8	9	10	Pos	Pts
2008	Honda	VAL	ASS	MNZ	NÜR	MIS	BRN	BRA	DON; 8	MAG; Ret	POR	24th	8

=== British Supersport Championship ===
(key) (Races in bold indicate pole position; races in italics indicate fastest lap)

Year	Bike	1	2	3	4	5	6	7	8	9	10	11	12	Pos	Pts
2009	Honda	BHI; 5	OUL; Ret	DON; 9	THR; 9	SNE; DNS	KNO; 5	MAL; Ret	BHGP; Ret	CAD; Ret	CRO; 11	SIL; Ret	OUL; 5	12th	52
2010	Kawasaki/Triumph	BHI; 14	THR; 9	OUL; Ret	CAD; 14	MAL	KNO; 16	SNE; 12	BHGP; Ret	CAD; Ret	CRO; 7	SIL; 9	OUL; 9	13th	38

Year	Bike	1	2	3	4	5	6	7	8	9	10	11	12	13	14	15	16	17	18	19	20	21	22	Pos	Pts
2023	Yamaha	**SLV**; 1	SLV; 1	OPK; Ret	OPK; 10	DPK	DPK	KNH	KNH	STN	STN	BRH	BRH	TXN	TXN	CPK	CPK	OPK	OPK	DPK	DPK	BRH	BRH	17th	64
