= Sarah Jordan =

Sarah Jordan may refer to:

== People ==
- Sass Jordan, Sarah "Sass" Jordan, British-born Canadian rock artist
- Sarah Jordan (motorcyclist), 2010 British Supersport Championship season

== Fictional characters ==
- Sarah Jordan, character in Helix (TV series)
- Sarah Jordan, character in The Island (2005 film)
- Sarah Jordan, character in Beyond Borders
