= 2011 British Superbike Championship =

British motorcycle racing season

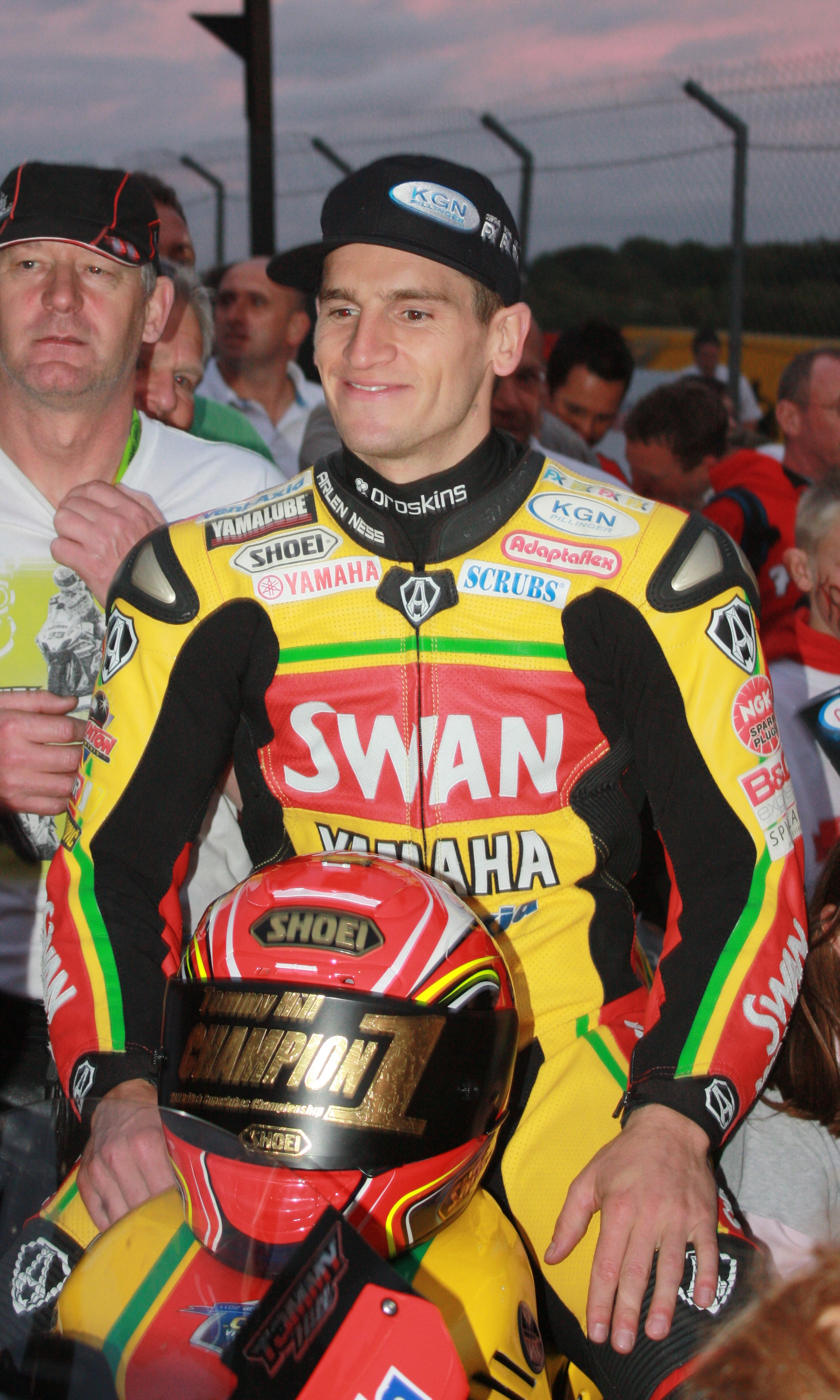
2011 champion, Tommy Hill

The 2011 British Superbike season was the 24th British Superbike Championship season. No major rules were changed from the previous year with the showdown section of the season staying and the continuation of the evolution class below the main superbike class. The field had greater quality than the year before with champion Ryuichi Kiyonari returning to defend his title on the HM Plant Honda alongside the returning former British superbike champion Shane Byrne. This meant that Josh Brookes moved onto the lone Relentless by TAS Suzuki, with Michael Laverty and Tommy Hill moving to a new swan Yamaha team. Another major signing was that of former MotoGP rider John Hopkins, who joined the Samsung Crescent Suzuki squad alongside Jon Kirkham.

The championship was tightly contested between Byrne, Hopkins and Hill, each taking their share of race wins, but it was not until the final round at Brands Hatch that the title would be decided. The first race was edgy with Michael Laverty taking the victory, the second race of the weekend would however swing the title towards Tommy Hill, Hopkin's Samsung Suzuki cut out in the early laps forcing him to restart the bikes electronics and ride from the back of the field to 12th place. It was all down to the final race, whoever finished first between Hopkins and Hill would win the title. Hopkins made a good start and lead Hill for almost the entire race, however on the penultimate lap Hill would pass Hopkins, leaving it until the final corner of the final lap Hopkins went up the inside to retake second however he could not hold the line and Hill squeezed up the inside to beat Hopkins to the title by 6 thousandths of a second (0.006s) to become the 2011 British Superbike Champion.

== Calendar ==
2011 Calendar
Main Season
Round		Circuit	Date	Pole position	Fastest lap	Winning rider	Winning team
1	R1	(England) Brands Hatch Indy	25 April	(England) Shane Byrne	(England) Tommy Hill	(England) Shane Byrne	HM Plant Honda
1	R2	(England) Brands Hatch Indy	25 April		(Northern Ireland) Michael Laverty	(England) Tommy Hill	Swan Yamaha
2	R1	(England) Oulton Park	2 May	(England) Tommy Hill	(Japan) Ryuichi Kiyonari	(Japan) Ryuichi Kiyonari	HM Plant Honda
2	R2	(England) Oulton Park	2 May		(England) Jon Kirkham	(United States) John Hopkins	Samsung Crescent Racing
3	R1	(England) Croft	15 May	(England) Shane Byrne	(England) Jon Kirkham	(England) Jon Kirkham	Samsung Crescent Racing
3	R2	(England) Croft	15 May		(England) Shane Byrne	(England) Shane Byrne	HM Plant Honda
4	R1	(England) Thruxton	30 May	(England) Alex Lowes	(England) Shane Byrne	(Northern Ireland) Michael Laverty	Swan Yamaha
4	R2	(England) Thruxton	30 May		(England) Shane Byrne	(England) Shane Byrne	HM Plant Honda
5	R1	(Scotland) Knockhill	19 June	(England) Tommy Hill	(England) Tommy Hill	(England) Tommy Hill	Swan Yamaha
5	R2	(Scotland) Knockhill	19 June		(England) Tommy Hill	(England) Tommy Hill	Swan Yamaha
6	R1	(England) Snetterton 300	3 July	(United States) John Hopkins	(Japan) Ryuichi Kiyonari	(United States) John Hopkins	Samsung Crescent Racing
6	R2	(England) Snetterton 300	3 July		(England) Shane Byrne	(Japan) Ryuichi Kiyonari	HM Plant Honda
7	R1	(England) Oulton Park	17 July	(United States) John Hopkins	(England) Tommy Hill	(England) Tommy Hill	Swan Yamaha
7	R2	(England) Oulton Park	17 July	Race Cancelled^{1}			
8	R1	(England) Brands Hatch GP	6 August	(England) Tommy Hill	(England) Tommy Hill	(Australia) Josh Brookes	Relentless Suzuki by TAS
8	R2	(England) Brands Hatch GP	7 August		(England) Tommy Hill	(England) Shane Byrne	HM Plant Honda
8	R3	(England) Brands Hatch GP	7 August		(United States) John Hopkins	(England) Tommy Hill	Swan Yamaha
9	R1^{1}	(England) Cadwell Park	28 August		(England) Tommy Hill	(Northern Ireland) Michael Laverty	Swan Yamaha
9	R2	(England) Cadwell Park	29 August	(Northern Ireland) Michael Laverty	(Northern Ireland) Michael Laverty	(England) Tommy Hill	Swan Yamaha
9	R3	(England) Cadwell Park	29 August		(England) Tommy Hill	(England) Tommy Hill	Swan Yamaha
The Showdown
10	R1	(England) Donington Park	11 September	(England) Tommy Hill	(United States) John Hopkins	(United States) John Hopkins	Samsung Crescent Racing
10	R2	(England) Donington Park	11 September		(Northern Ireland) Michael Laverty	(United States) John Hopkins	Samsung Crescent Racing
11	R1	(England) Silverstone Arena GP	25 September	(Northern Ireland) Michael Laverty	(Australia) Josh Brookes	(United States) John Hopkins	Samsung Crescent Racing
11	R2	(England) Silverstone Arena GP	25 September		(Australia) Josh Brookes	(Australia) Josh Brookes	Relentless Suzuki by TAS
12	R1	(England) Brands Hatch GP	8 October	(Australia) Josh Brookes	(Australia) Josh Brookes	(Northern Ireland) Michael Laverty	Swan Yamaha
12	R2	(England) Brands Hatch GP	9 October		(England) Shane Byrne	(England) Shane Byrne	HM Plant Honda
12	R3	(England) Brands Hatch GP	9 October		(Australia) Josh Brookes	(England) Shane Byrne	HM Plant Honda

Notes:

1. – The second race at Oulton Park was cancelled due to bad weather conditions. As a result, the race was run at the next possible round of the championship at Cadwell Park, with the second race grid positions standing for the race.

== Entry list ==
2011 Entry List
Team	Constructor	Bike	No.	Riders	Class	Rounds
HM Plant Honda	Honda	Honda CBR1000RR	1	(Japan) Ryuichi Kiyonari		All
HM Plant Honda	Honda	Honda CBR1000RR	67	(England) Shane Byrne		All
Relentless Suzuki by TAS	Suzuki	Suzuki GSX-R1000	2	(Australia) Josh Brookes		All
Relentless Suzuki by TAS	Suzuki	Suzuki GSX-R1000	11	(England) Guy Martin		1
MSS Colchester Kawasaki	Kawasaki	Kawasaki ZX-10R	3	(Scotland) Stuart Easton		1–3
MSS Colchester Kawasaki	Kawasaki	Kawasaki ZX-10R	5	(Northern Ireland) Ian Lowry		10–12
MSS Colchester Kawasaki	Kawasaki	Kawasaki ZX-10R	22	(England) Alex Lowes		4–9
MSS Colchester Kawasaki	Kawasaki	Kawasaki ZX-10R	101	(England) Gary Mason		1–9
MSS Colchester Kawasaki	Kawasaki	Kawasaki ZX-10R	101	(England) Gary Mason	S	10–12
Sorrymate.com SMT Honda	Honda	Honda CBR1000RR	4	(England) Dan Linfoot		1–6
Sorrymate.com SMT Honda	Honda	Honda CBR1000RR	16	(England) James Ellison		7–10, 12
Tyco Racing Team	Honda	Honda CBR1000RR	4	(England) Dan Linfoot		11–12
Tyco Racing Team	Honda	Honda CBR1000RR	24	(Switzerland) Patric Muff	E	All
Tyco Racing Team	Honda	Honda CBR1000RR	46	(England) Tommy Bridewell		1–5
Tyco Racing Team	Honda	Honda CBR1000RR	60	(England) Peter Hickman		All
Buildbase BMW	BMW	BMW S1000RR	5	(Northern Ireland) Ian Lowry		1–9
Buildbase BMW	BMW	BMW S1000RR	8	(Northern Ireland) John Laverty		1–7
Buildbase BMW	BMW	BMW S1000RR	47	(England) Richard Cooper		12
Buildbase BMW	BMW	BMW S1000RR	77	(England) Barry Burrell	E	All
Buildbase BMW	BMW	BMW S1000RR	99	(England) Lee Jackson		10–12
Rapid Solicitors-Bathams Ducati	Ducati	Ducati 1198	6	(England) Michael Rutter		1–9, 11–12
Rapid Solicitors-Bathams Ducati	Ducati	Ducati 1198	40	(England) Martin Jessopp		All
Swan Yamaha	Yamaha	Yamaha YZF-R1	7	(Northern Ireland) Michael Laverty		All
Swan Yamaha	Yamaha	Yamaha YZF-R1	33	(England) Tommy Hill		All
Pr1mo Racing	Kawasaki	Kawasaki ZX-10R	9	(England) Chris Walker		All
Samsung Crescent Racing	Suzuki	Suzuki GSX-R1000	10	(England) Jon Kirkham		All
Samsung Crescent Racing	Suzuki	Suzuki GSX-R1000	21	(United States) John Hopkins		1–8, 10–12
Splitlath Motorsport	Aprilia	Aprilia RSV4 1000	11	(Northern Ireland) John Simpson	E	9, 11–12
Splitlath Motorsport	Aprilia	Aprilia RSV4 1000	56	(South Africa) Hudson Kennaugh		1–4, 6
Splitlath Motorsport	Aprilia	Aprilia RSV4 1000	56	(South Africa) Hudson Kennaugh	E	7–8
Splitlath Motorsport	Aprilia	Aprilia RSV4 1000	100	(England) Jenny Tinmouth		1–3
Splitlath Motorsport	Aprilia	Aprilia RSV4 1000	100	(United States) Mark Miller	E	5
Splitlath Motorsport	Aprilia	Aprilia RSV4 1000	100	(United States) Mark Miller		6
Splitlath Motorsport	Aprilia	Aprilia RSV4 1000	100	(England) Karl Harris		7–8
Splitlath Motorsport	Aprilia	Aprilia RSV4 1000	100	(England) Karl Harris	E	9–12
AIR Racing	Kawasaki	Kawasaki ZX-10R	12	(England) Josh Day	E	1, 3–7
Doodson Motorsport	BMW	BMW S1000RR	14	(Australia) Glenn Allerton	E	8
Doodson Motorsport	BMW	BMW S1000RR	20	(England) Tom Tunstall	E	1–6
Doodson Motorsport	BMW	BMW S1000RR	25	(Australia) David Anthony	E	10–12
PR Racing	Kawasaki	Kawasaki ZX-10R	17	(England) Simon Andrews	E	1–6
PR Racing	Kawasaki	Kawasaki ZX-10R	56	(South Africa) Hudson Kennaugh	E	9–10
Kawasaki World Superbike	Kawasaki	Kawasaki ZX-10R	17	(Spain) Joan Lascorz		8
Kawasaki World Superbike	Kawasaki	Kawasaki ZX-10R	23	(Australia) Broc Parkes		8
Jentin Racing	Honda	Honda CBR1000RR	19	(England) Steve Brogan		1–6, 9–12
Jentin Racing	Honda	Honda CBR1000RR	66	(England) Steve Mercer		12
Team WFR	Honda	Honda CBR1000RR	22	(England) Alex Lowes	E	1–3
Team WFR	Honda	Honda CBR1000RR	27	(England) James Westmoreland	E	10
Team WFR	Honda	Honda CBR1000RR	27	(England) James Westmoreland	S	11–12
Team WFR	Honda	Honda CBR1000RR	45	(Australia) Glen Richards	E	All
Team WFR	Honda	Honda CBR1000RR	81	(England) Graeme Gowland	E	1, 3–12
Team WFR	Honda	Honda CBR1000RR	98	(United States) Jake Zemke	E	5–8
Motorpoint Yamaha	Yamaha	Yamaha YZF-R1	22	(England) Alex Lowes		10–12
Motorpoint Yamaha	Yamaha	Yamaha YZF-R1	27	(England) James Westmoreland		1–8
Motorpoint Yamaha	Yamaha	Yamaha YZF-R1	46	(England) Tommy Bridewell		9–12
Motorpoint Yamaha	Yamaha	Yamaha YZF-R1	65	(France) Loris Baz		1–7
Hobbs Racing	BMW	BMW S1000RR	25	(England) Dennis Hobbs	E	1, 3, 5
Bournemouth Kawasaki	Kawasaki	Kawasaki ZX-10R	37	(England) James Hillier	E	All
Buy-force.com Quattro Plant	Kawasaki	Kawasaki ZX-10R	54	(Republic of Ireland) Steve Heneghan	E	11–12
Marks Bloom Racing	Kawasaki	Kawasaki ZX-10R	55	(Isle of Man) Dan Kneen	E	1–2, 4–8, 10–12
Spike Racing BMW	BMW	BMW S1000RR	64	(England) Aaron Zanotti	E	All
Close Print Finance Honda	Honda	Honda CBR1000RR	75	(England) Craig Fitzpatrick	E	1–6, 10–12
777RR Motorsport	Suzuki	Suzuki GSX-R1000	78	(Italy) Matteo Mossa	E	1–3, 5–9
Boss D&B	BMW	BMW S1000RR	79	(England) Nick Medd		1, 3, 10
Moto Rapido Ducati	Ducati	Ducati 1198	88	(England) Scott Smart	E	All

Icon	Class
E	Evolution Class
S	2012-specification

Key
Regular Rider
Wildcard Rider
Replacement Rider

== Championship standings ==
=== Riders' Championship ===
Pos	Rider	Bike	BRH (England)		OUL (England)		CRO (England)		THR (England)		KNO (Scotland)		SNE (England)		OUL (England)		BRH (England)			CAD (England)			DON (England)		SIL (England)		BRH (England)			Pts
Pos	Rider	Bike	R1	R2	R1	R2	R1	R2	R1	R2	R1	R2	R1	R2	R1	R2	R1	R2	R3	R1	R2	R3	R1	R2	R1	R2	R1	R2	R3	Pts
The Championship Showdown
1	(England) Tommy Hill	Yamaha	2	1	DNS	DNS	14	6	24	4	1	1	2	DNS	1	C	19	2	1	2	1	1	3	2	3	2	4	4	2	647
2	(United States) John Hopkins	Suzuki	17	5	2	1	2	3	4	3	2	Ret	1	3	Ret	C	4	3	2				1	1	1	3	3	12	3	645
3	(England) Shane Byrne	Honda	1	3	4	3	Ret	1	3	1	3	2	3	4	4	C	16	1	3	3	3	4	4	8	5	5	6	1	1	625
4	(Northern Ireland) Michael Laverty	Yamaha	Ret	4	5	5	24	Ret	1	7	6	3	4	5	6	C	8	4	4	1	2	3	2	14	2	4	1	NC	5	601
5	(Australia) Josh Brookes	Suzuki	Ret	DNS	6	Ret	8	4	9	6	5	13	7	2	2	C	1	6	Ret	DSQ	4	2	6	5	4	1	2	Ret	6	598
6	(Japan) Ryuichi Kiyonari	Honda	Ret	2	1	4	25	15	10	19	10	4	5	1	15	C	17	12	6	5	9	7	Ret	6	28	13	17	16	11	526
BSB Riders Cup
7	(England) Jon Kirkham	Suzuki	5	Ret	7	7	1	Ret	Ret	9	8	11	6	Ret	9	C	9	8	10	4	6	6	5	3	27	6	8	2	Ret	210
8	(England) Michael Rutter	Ducati	6	7	11	6	Ret	8	2	Ret	Ret	9	13	DNS	3	C	2	5	5	Ret	Ret	DNS			8	8	7	Ret	7	164
9	(England) Peter Hickman	Honda	13	9	13	8	7	9	5	2	13	8	10	DNS	Ret	C	25	10	9	8	5	5	7	Ret	Ret	7	Ret	14	9	155
10	(England) Gary Mason	Kawasaki	18	10	9	10	3	7	Ret	14	4	6	11	11	5	C	3	Ret	7	6	10	12	17	17	14	14	Ret	DNS	DNS	139
11	(England) Martin Jessopp	Ducati	9	15	15	12	19	Ret	12	10	Ret	12	12	6	Ret	C	23	9	Ret	7	7	8	9	4	9	Ret	10	Ret	13	110
12	(England) Chris Walker	Kawasaki	10	11	16	11	Ret	13	8	8	14	7	8	8	14	C	5	15	15	10	Ret	DNS	Ret	9	17	Ret	12	5	Ret	105
13	(England) Graeme Gowland	Honda	Ret	DNS			WD	WD	19	23	17	DNS	15	DNS	16	C	7	11	11	11	8	9	10	10	6	11	9	6	8	92
14	(France) Loris Baz	Yamaha	7	13	8	9	4	5	25	11	9	Ret	9	7	7	C														88
15	(England) James Westmoreland	Yamaha	Ret	Ret	14	13	12	12	26	12	7	5	14	DNS	8	C	6	25	14											88
15	(England) James Westmoreland	Honda																					11	12	12	Ret	14	8	10	88
16	(England) James Ellison	Honda													11	C	24	Ret	13	13	11	10	8	7			5	3	4	79
17	(England) Tommy Bridewell	Honda	3	Ret	WD	WD	10	10	Ret	17	11	Ret																		76
17	(England) Tommy Bridewell	Yamaha																			Ret	11	14	11	10	9	11	7	12	76
18	(Scotland) Stuart Easton	Kawasaki	4	6	3	2	6	2																						69
19	(England) Dan Linfoot	Honda	8	8	10	15	17	Ret	6	5	Ret	15	18	12											15	10	NC	9	Ret	63
20	(England) Alex Lowes	Honda	12	12	12	14	5	11																						60
20	(England) Alex Lowes	Kawasaki							7	Ret	Ret	DNS	16	DNS	13	C	21	20	16	12	Ret	Ret								60
20	(England) Alex Lowes	Yamaha																					16	Ret	7	12	15	Ret	DNS	60
21	(Australia) Glen Richards	Honda	11	14	Ret	Ret	9	16	14	18	12	18	20	13	12	C	10	14	17	9	13	14	13	15	13	16	16	Ret	DNS	54
22	(Northern Ireland) Ian Lowry	BMW	Ret	Ret	18	18	18	14	16	22	DNS	DNS	19	9	Ret	C	11	Ret	Ret	WD	WD	WD								27
22	(Northern Ireland) Ian Lowry	Kawasaki																					12	Ret	11	15	13	Ret	Ret	27
23	(England) Scott Smart	Ducati	24	20	17	17	22	Ret	Ret	DNS	16	14	Ret	DNS	10	C	26	18	20	14	12	13	Ret	DNS	16	Ret	Ret	13	15	21
24	(Spain) Joan Lascorz	Kawasaki															Ret	7	8											17
25	(England) Barry Burrell	BMW	21	21	19	23	Ret	17	13	16	19	17	27	14	19	C	15	16	19	16	15	16	15	13	18	17	18	Ret	14	13
26	(Switzerland) Patric Muff	Honda	19	19	20	20	16	19	15	21	20	16	23	15	Ret	C	12	17	NC	18	18	18	18	18	19	18	19	11	16	11
27	(England) Karl Harris	Aprilia													Ret	C	Ret	Ret	Ret	15	14	15	Ret	Ret	22	22	21	10	18	10
28	(United States) Jake Zemke	Honda									21	20	21	10	17	C	14	19	18											8
29	(England) Simon Andrews	Kawasaki	15	17	Ret	19	21	18	27	20	15	10	17	DNS																8
30	(England) Steve Brogan	Honda	14	16	Ret	16	Ret	DNS	11	15	Ret	19	Ret	DNS							16	Ret	Ret	16	20	19	DNS	DNS	DNS	8
31	(Australia) Broc Parkes	Kawasaki															18	13	12											7
32	(Northern Ireland) John Laverty	BMW	Ret	DNS	WD	WD	13	21	20	13	18	23	22	DNS	DNS	C														6
33	(South Africa) Hudson Kennaugh	Aprilia	Ret	Ret	23	Ret	11	Ret	17	Ret			Ret	DNS	18	C	Ret	Ret	DNS											5
33	(South Africa) Hudson Kennaugh	Kawasaki																		19	Ret	19	19	Ret						5
34	(Isle of Man) Dan Kneen	Kawasaki	WD	WD	WD	WD			22	DNS	DNS	DNS	Ret	21	20	C	13	23	Ret				Ret	Ret	23	21	Ret	17	Ret	3
35	(England) James Hillier	Kawasaki	20	18	21	21	23	20	28	27	Ret	Ret	Ret	17	23	C	WD	WD	WD	17	17	17	20	20	Ret	Ret	Ret	15	17	1
36	(England) Tom Tunstall	BMW	25	23	24	22	15	23	Ret	Ret	23	22	Ret	DNS																1
37	(England) Aaron Zanotti	BMW	22	22	22	24	20	24	18	24	DNS	DNS	24	16	22	C	20	22	22	20	Ret	20	23	22	24	24	22	18	19	0
38	(England) Guy Martin	Suzuki	16	Ret																										0
39	(England) Craig Fitzpatrick	Honda	23	Ret	DNS	DNS	Ret	22	23	25	22	21	DSQ	18									22	Ret	Ret	DNS				0
40	(Australia) David Anthony	BMW																					24	19	21	20	Ret	DNS	DNS	0
41	(Italy) Matteo Mossa	Suzuki	Ret	Ret	DNQ	DNQ	DNQ	DNQ					DNQ	DNQ	21	C	Ret	24	Ret	21	19	Ret								0
42	(England) Josh Day	Kawasaki	WD	WD			Ret	25	21	26	24	Ret	25	19	Ret	C														0
43	(Republic of Ireland) Steve Heneghan	Kawasaki																							Ret	Ret	23	19	Ret	0
44	(United States) Mark Miller	Aprilia									Ret	24	26	20																0
45	(England) Steve Mercer	Honda																									20	Ret	DNS	0
46	(Australia) Glenn Allerton	BMW															22	21	21											0
47	(England) Lee Jackson	BMW																					21	21	26	23				0
48	(Northern Ireland) John Simpson	Aprilia																			DNS	DNS			25	25				0
	(England) Jenny Tinmouth	Aprilia	WD	WD	DNQ	DNQ	Ret	Ret																						0
	(England) Dennis Hobbs	BMW	WD	WD			WD	WD			Ret	Ret																		0
	(England) Nick Medd	BMW	WD	WD			DNQ	DNQ															Ret	DNS						0
	(England) Richard Cooper	BMW																									DNS	DNS	DNS	0
Pos	Rider	Bike	BRH (England)		OUL (England)		CRO (England)		THR (England)		KNO (Scotland)		SNE (England)		OUL (England)		BRH (England)			CAD (England)			DON (England)		SIL (England)		BRH (England)			Pts

Colour	Result
Gold	Winner
Silver	Second place
Bronze	Third place
Green	Points classification
Blue	Non-points classification
Blue	Non-classified finish (NC)
Purple	Retired, not classified (Ret)
Red	Did not qualify (DNQ)
Red	Did not pre-qualify (DNPQ)
Black	Disqualified (DSQ)
White	Did not start (DNS)
White	Withdrew (WD)
White	Race cancelled (C)
Blank	Did not practice (DNP)
Blank	Did not arrive (DNA)
Blank	Excluded (EX)

=== Evolution Championship ===
Pos	Rider	Bike	BRH (England)		OUL (England)		CRO (England)		THR (England)		KNO (Scotland)		SNE (England)		OUL (England)		BRH (England)			CAD (England)			DON (England)		SIL (England)		BRH (England)			Pts
Pos	Rider	Bike	R1	R2	R1	R2	R1	R2	R1	R2	R1	R2	R1	R2	R1	R2	R1	R2	R3	R1	R2	R3	R1	R2	R1	R2	R1	R2	R3	Pts
1	(Australia) Glen Richards	Honda	11	14	Ret	Ret	9	16	14	18	12	18	20	13	12	C	10	14	17	9	13	14	13	15	13	16	16	Ret	DNS	423
2	(England) Graeme Gowland	Honda	Ret	DNS			WD	WD	19	23	17	DNS	15	DNS	16	C	7	11	11	11	8	9	10	10	6	11	9	6	8	396
3	(England) Barry Burrell	BMW	21	21	19	23	Ret	17	13	16	19	17	27	14	19	C	15	16	19	16	15	16	15	13	18	17	18	Ret	14	326
4	(Switzerland) Patric Muff	Honda	19	19	20	20	16	19	15	21	20	16	23	15	Ret	C	12	17	NC	18	18	18	18	18	19	18	19	11	16	288
5	(England) Scott Smart	Ducati	24	20	17	17	22	Ret	Ret	DNS	16	14	Ret	DNS	10	C	26	18	20	14	12	13	Ret	DNS	16	Ret	Ret	13	15	257
6	(England) Aaron Zanotti	BMW	22	22	22	24	20	24	18	24	DNS	DNS	24	16	22	C	20	22	22	20	Ret	20	23	22	24	24	22	18	19	195
7	(England) James Hillier	Kawasaki	20	18	21	21	23	20	28	27	Ret	Ret	Ret	17	23	C	WD	WD	WD	17	17	17	20	20	Ret	Ret	Ret	15	17	163
8	(England) Simon Andrews	Kawasaki	15	17	Ret	19	21	18	27	20	15	10	17	DNS																159
9	(England) Alex Lowes	Honda	12	12	12	14	5	11																						100
10	(England) Karl Harris	Aprilia																		15	14	15	Ret	Ret	22	22	21	10	18	98
11	(United States) Jake Zemke	Honda									21	20	21	10	17	C	14	19	18											88
12	(Isle of Man) Dan Kneen	Kawasaki	WD	WD	WD	WD			22	DNS	DNS	DNS	Ret	21	20	C	13	23	Ret				Ret	Ret	23	21	Ret	17	Ret	73
13	(England) Tom Tunstall	BMW	25	23	24	22	15	23	Ret	Ret	23	22	Ret	DNS																71
14	(England) Craig Fitzpatrick	Honda	23	Ret	DNS	DNS	Ret	22	23	25	22	21	DSQ	18									22	Ret	Ret	DNS				68
15	(England) Josh Day	Kawasaki	WD	WD			Ret	25	21	26	24	Ret	25	19	Ret	C														47
16	(England) James Westmoreland	Honda																					11	12						40
17	(Australia) David Anthony	BMW																					24	19	21	20	Ret	DNS	DNS	37
18	(South Africa) Hudson Kennaugh	Aprilia													18	C	Ret	Ret	DNS											37
18	(South Africa) Hudson Kennaugh	Kawasaki																		19	Ret	19	19	Ret						37
19	(Italy) Matteo Mossa	Suzuki	Ret	Ret	DNQ	DNQ	DNQ	DNQ					DNQ	DNQ	21	C	Ret	24	Ret	21	19	Ret								28
20	(Australia) Glenn Allerton	BMW															22	21	21											27
21	(Republic of Ireland) Steve Heneghan	Kawasaki																							Ret	Ret	23	19	Ret	17
22	(Northern Ireland) John Simpson	Aprilia																			DNS	DNS			25	25				13
23	(United States) Mark Miller	Aprilia									Ret	24																		7
	(England) Dennis Hobbs	BMW	WD	WD			WD	WD			Ret	Ret																		0
Pos	Rider	Bike	BRH (England)		OUL (England)		CRO (England)		THR (England)		KNO (Scotland)		SNE (England)		OUL (England)		BRH (England)			CAD (England)			DON (England)		SIL (England)		BRH (England)			Pts

Colour	Result
Gold	Winner
Silver	Second place
Bronze	Third place
Green	Points classification
Blue	Non-points classification
Blue	Non-classified finish (NC)
Purple	Retired, not classified (Ret)
Red	Did not qualify (DNQ)
Red	Did not pre-qualify (DNPQ)
Black	Disqualified (DSQ)
White	Did not start (DNS)
White	Withdrew (WD)
White	Race cancelled (C)
Blank	Did not practice (DNP)
Blank	Did not arrive (DNA)
Blank	Excluded (EX)

=== Manufacturers' Championship ===
Pos	Manufacturer	BRH (England)		OUL (England)		CRO (England)		THR (England)		KNO (Scotland)		SNE (England)		OUL (England)		BRH (England)			CAD (England)			DON (England)		SIL (England)		BRH (England)			Pts
Pos	Manufacturer	R1	R2	R1	R2	R1	R2	R1	R2	R1	R2	R1	R2	R1	R2	R1	R2	R3	R1	R2	R3	R1	R2	R1	R2	R1	R2	R3	Pts
1	Yamaha	2	1	5	5	4	5	1	4	1	1	2	5	1	C	6	2	1	1	1	1	2	2	2	2	1	4	2	503
2	Suzuki	5	5	2	1	1	3	4	3	2	11	1	2	2	C	1	3	2	4	4	2	1	1	1	1	2	2	3	490
3	Honda	1	2	1	3	5	1	3	1	3	2	3	1	4	C	7	1	3	3	3	4	4	6	5	5	5	1	1	454
4	Kawasaki	4	6	3	2	3	2	7	8	4	6	8	8	5	C	3	7	7	6	10	12	12	9	11	14	12	5	17	249
5	Ducati	6	7	11	6	19	8	2	10	16	9	12	6	3	C	2	5	5	7	7	8	9	4	8	8	7	13	7	230
6	BMW	21	21	18	18	13	14	13	13	18	17	19	9	19	C	11	16	19	16	15	16	15	13	18	17	18	Ret	14	30
7	Aprilia	Ret	Ret	23	Ret	11	Ret	17	Ret	Ret	24	26	20	18	C	Ret	Ret	Ret	15	14	15	Ret	Ret	22	22	21	10	18	15
Pos	Manufacturer	BRH (England)		OUL (England)		CRO (England)		THR (England)		KNO (Scotland)		SNE (England)		OUL (England)		BRH (England)			CAD (England)			DON (England)		SIL (England)		BRH (England)			Pts
