= Hudson Kennaugh =

South African motorcycle racer (born 1981)

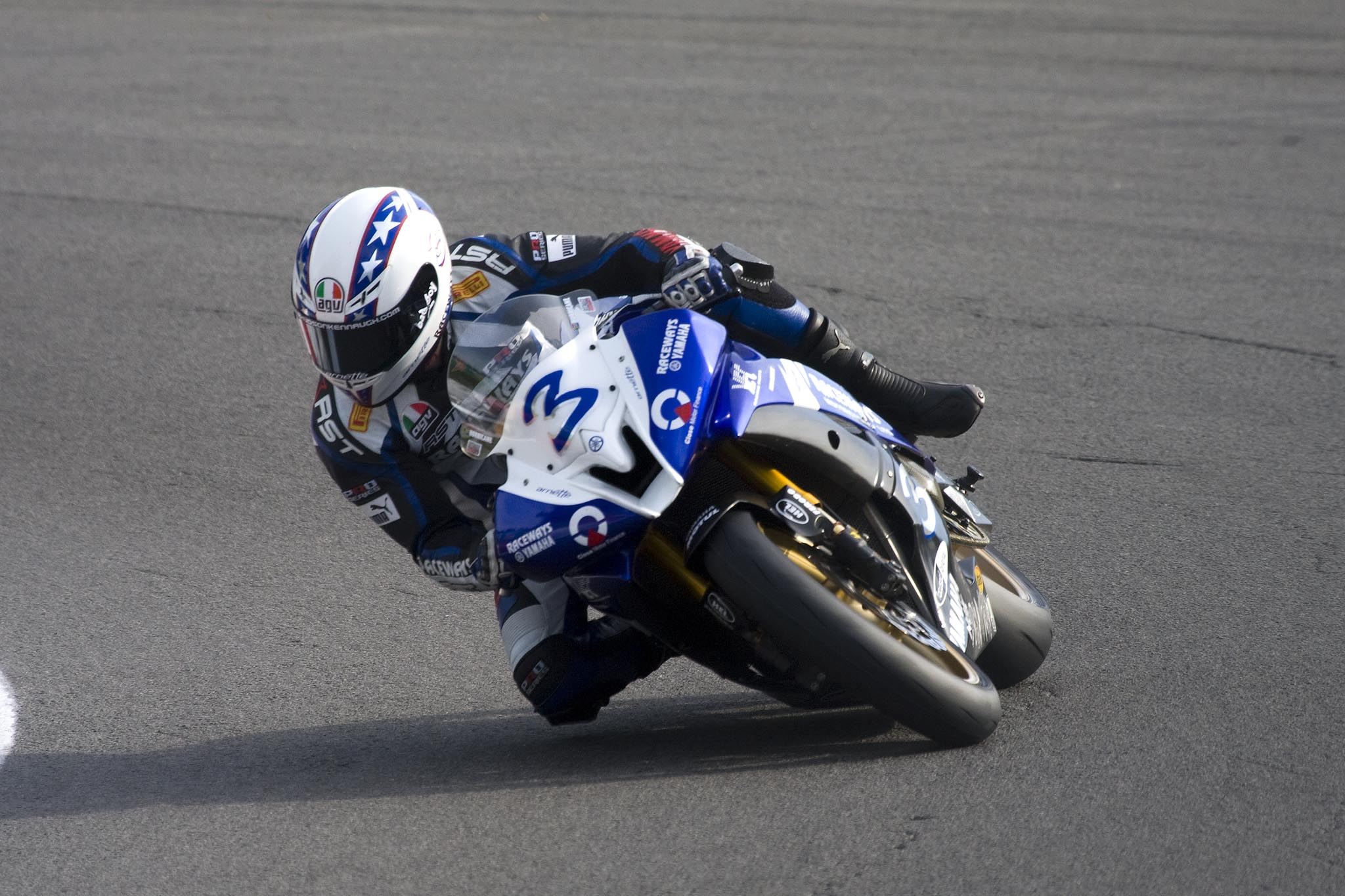
- Kennaugh in 2008
- Nationality: South African
- Born: 12 January 1981 (age 45)
- Current team: Trik-Moto Bahnstormer BMW
- Bike number: 3
- Website: hudsonkennaugh.com
Motorcycle racing career statistics
Isle of Man TT career
TTs contested	2 (2010-2011)
TT wins	0
TT podiums	0

Hudson Kennaugh (born 12 January 1981) is a South African professional motorcycle racer. He currently competes in the British National Superstock 1000 championship aboard a BMW S1000RR. He is a former South African Superbike champion, he rode the 2009 British Supersport Championship, for the Linxcel-Seton Tuning Team. His surname is of Manx descent and is pronounced 'Ken-Oh'.(Although, the surname on the Isle of Man is pronounced as 'Kenyk' rather like the word 'cognac' only starting with 'ken' rather than 'con')

== Early years ==
Born in Natal, South Africa, Kennaugh began racing mini-moto aged 5, winning the Junior South African Motocross championship in 1993. He turned to road racing a year later, and in 1995 he came fourth in the South African 125cc championship aboard a Yamaha YZ125 road bike. The Yamaha YZ125 road bike featured a hydroformed exhaust manufactured by Hylton Spencer. Four years of 250cc racing followed.

== South African Superbike championship ==
Kennaugh contested the South African Supersport 600cc championship in 2002 and 2003, finishing eighth and third in the championship. He then moved up to the 1000cc Superbike class, winning the title at his first attempt.

== Britain and beyond ==
Kennaugh did one-off races in the GSX-R Cup in both 2003 and 2004, and contested the championship full-time in 2005, winning the title. He also made two World Supersport Championship starts at the end of 2005, with the Moto – 1 team.

Kennaugh moved to England in 2006 and contested that year's British Superstock Championship for the Raceways team. He started 2007 in Superstocks, but also contested several rounds of the British Superbike Championship on a Virgin Yamaha, without much success. For 2008 he mounted a challenge for the British Supersport Championship, taking on Australian Glen Richards' Triumph, taking a dominant win at Mallory Park and three poles. He ultimately finished second to Richards in the standings, despite a further win at Silverstone. Kennaugh was also a wildcard entry in the 2008 World Supersport rounds at Brands Hatch and Donington Park, finishing tenth and fifth.

In 2009, Kennaugh joined the Linxcel-Seton Tuning Team, again in Supersport on a Yamaha. He recorded two pole positions but his best race result was a pair of fourth places. On 14 August, Kennaugh announced on his website that he and the Linxcel-Seton Tuning Team had gone their separate ways. He joined Gearlink Kawasaki to replace the injured Chris Martin, but results did not improve.

In 2010, Kennaugh finished second in the British Superbike Evo class starting on a Kawasaki Ninja ZX-10R, and after the team folded, he moved to the split lath Aprilia RSV4, where he recorded multiple wins before losing the championship by three points. He went on to compete in the 2011 British Superbike Championship with a few point scoring rides.

2012 saw a change to super stock Kawasaki machinery. This season was a setback because, Kennaugh crashed on the opening lap at the Thruxton Circuit and broke his back. Upon return from injury, he rode for the GR Aprilia Superstock team changing back to the Ionic balance Kawasaki for the final round, finishing fourth.

2013 meant joining forces with Tony Homer Racing, the team recorded 5 victories, multiple podiums and the British Superstock championship. Kennaugh was the first South African to win a British Title since Jon Ekerold won the world championship in the 1980s

In 2014, Kennaugh switched to BMW machinery recorded one victory, multiple podiums and came fourth in the championship with Linxcel BMW race team.

2015 was the birth of the Trik Moto BMW race team. Kennaugh recorded mulple victories and podiums and competed at the Isle of Man TT races where a crash in the lightweight race at Bradden Bridge saw Kennaugh receive a broken back which hindered his Superstock challenge ending the year in third place.

2016 saw the continuation of the Trik Moto BMW team partnered by Bahnstormer BMW and Spoortech with high expectations.

== Career statistics ==
=== All Time ===
Years active	Series	Races	Poles	Podiums	**Wins**	**2nd place**	**3rd place**	Titles
2010	British Superbike (EVO)	27	4	19	7	7	5	0

=== British Supersport Championship ===
(key) (Races in bold indicate pole position, races in italics indicate fastest lap)

Year	Bike	1	2	3	4	5	6	7	8	9	10	11	12	Pos	Pts	Ref
2008	Yamaha	THR; 4	OUL; 2	BHGP; 1	DON; Ret	SNE; 4	MAL; 1	OUL; 2	KNO; 5	CAD; 4	CRO; 3	SIL; 1	BHI; 10	**2nd**	**187**	
2009	Yamaha	BHI; 4	**OUL**; DNS	**DON**; 14	THR; 8	SNE; 4	KNO; 13	MAL; Ret	BHGP; Ret					9th	58	
2009	Kawasaki									CAD; 17	CRO; Ret	SIL; 10	OUL; 4	9th	58	

=== British Superbike Championship ===
(key)

Year	Class	Bike	BHI (England)		THR (England)		OUL (England)		CAD (England)		MAL (England)		KNO (Scotland)		SNE (England)			BHGP (England)			CAD (England)		CRO (England)		SIL (England)		OUL (England)			Pos	Pts
Year	Class	Bike	R1	R2	R1	R2	R1	R2	R1	R2	R1	R2	R1	R2	R1	R2	R3	R1	R2	R3	R1	R2	R1	R2	R1	R2	R1	R2	R3	Pos	Pts
2010	BSB	Kawasaki	18	15	Ret	19	14	9	16	18	18	17	20	C	22	16	15	20	16	Ret	Ret	Ret	15	17	16	15	19	15	14	25th	16
2010	BSB Evo	Kawasaki	2	2	Ret	3	1	1	2	3	2	1	4	C	5	3	3	4	2	Ret	Ret	Ret	1	1	2	3	1	2	1	**2nd**	428

Year	Make	1			2			3			4			5			6			7			8			9			10			11			12			Pos	Pts
Year	Make	R1	R2	R3	R1	R2	R3	R1	R2	R3	R1	R2	R3	R1	R2	R3	R1	R2	R3	R1	R2	R3	R1	R2	R3	R1	R2	R3	R1	R2	R3	R1	R2	R3	R1	R2	R3	Pos	Pts
2011	Aprilia/Kawasaki	BHI; Ret	BHI; Ret		OUL; 23	OUL; Ret		CRO; 11	CRO; Ret		THR; 17	THR; Ret		KNO	KNO		SNE; Ret	SNE; DNS		OUL; 18	OUL; C		BHGP; Ret	BHGP; Ret	BHGP; DNS	CAD; 19	CAD; Ret	CAD; 19	DON; 19	DON; Ret		SIL	SIL		BHGP	BHGP	BHGP	33rd	5
