= 2009 British Supersport Championship =

The 2009 British Supersport Championship was the twenty-second running of the British Supersport Championship. The top two runners in the 2008 championship, Glen Richards and Ian Lowry both moved up to the British Superbike Championship, with HM Plant Honda and Relentless Suzuki respectively. Steve Plater and the returning Billy McConnell were early season contenders for the championship, with Plater eventually going on to claim the championship at the final round, at Oulton Park.

== Calendar ==
Round	Circuit	Date	Pole position	Fastest lap	Winning rider	Winning team	Ref
1	(England) Brands Hatch Indy	April 13	(Australia) Billy McConnell	(England) Steve Plater	(Australia) Billy McConnell	MAP Raceways Yamaha	
2	(England) Oulton Park	May 4	(South Africa) Hudson Kennaugh	(England) Steve Plater	(England) Daniel Cooper	Centurion Racing	
3	(England) Donington Park	May 25	(South Africa) Hudson Kennaugh	(South Africa) Hudson Kennaugh	(England) Steve Plater	HM Plant Honda	
4	(England) Thruxton	May 31	(England) James Westmoreland	(England) James Westmoreland	(Australia) Billy McConnell	MAP Raceways Yamaha	
5	(England) Snetterton	June 21	(Australia) Billy McConnell	(England) Steve Plater	(England) Steve Plater	HM Plant Honda	
6	(Scotland) Knockhill	July 5	(Australia) Billy McConnell	(England) James Westmoreland	(England) Ben Wilson	Gearlink Kawasaki	
7	(England) Mallory Park	July 19	(Australia) Billy McConnell	(Australia) Billy McConnell	(England) Chris Martin	Gearlink Kawasaki	
8	(England) Brands Hatch GP	August 8	(England) James Westmoreland	(England) Dan Linfoot	(England) James Westmoreland	JW Racing Triumph	
9	(England) Cadwell Park	August 31	(Australia) Billy McConnell	(Australia) Billy McConnell	(Australia) Billy McConnell	MAP Raceways Yamaha	
10	(England) Croft	September 13	(Australia) Billy McConnell	(Australia) Billy McConnell	(England) Steve Plater	HM Plant Honda	
11	(England) Silverstone International	September 27	(England) James Westmoreland	(England) James Westmoreland	(England) James Westmoreland	TW Triumph	
12	(England) Oulton Park	October 10	(England) Steve Plater	(England) James Westmoreland	(England) Steve Plater	HM Plant Honda	

== Entry list ==
2009 Entry list
Round By Round entry list:	BHI OUL DON THR SNE KNO MAL BHGP CAD CRO SIL OUL				
Team	Bike	No	Riders	Class	Rounds
Linxcel-Seton Tuning Yamaha	Yamaha YZF-R6	2	(South Africa) Hudson Kennaugh		1–8
Linxcel-Seton Tuning Yamaha	Yamaha YZF-R6	25	(England) Nick Clark		9
Linxcel-Seton Tuning Yamaha	Yamaha YZF-R6	25	(Australia) Jason O'Halloran		10
Linxcel-Seton Tuning Yamaha	Yamaha YZF-R6	6	(England) James Webb		11
Gearlink Kawasaki	Kawasaki Ninja ZX-6R	2	(South Africa) Hudson Kennaugh		9
Gearlink Kawasaki	Kawasaki Ninja ZX-6R	15	(England) Ben Wilson		1–11
Gearlink Kawasaki	Kawasaki Ninja ZX-6R	26	(England) Chris Martin		1–8
Padgetts Motorcycles Honda	Honda CBR600RR	3	(England) Ian Hutchinson		5–11
Padgetts Motorcycles Honda	Honda CBR600RR	6	(England) James Webb		1–10
JW Racing Triumph	Triumph Daytona 675	4	(England) James Westmoreland		1–11
MAP Raceways Yamaha	Yamaha YZF-R6	7	(Australia) Billy McConnell		1–11
MAP Raceways Yamaha	Yamaha YZF-R6	13	(Northern Ireland) Lee Johnston		1–11
MAP Raceways Yamaha	Yamaha YZF-R6	39	(South Africa) Allan Jon Venter		1–11
Boss D&B Racing Yamaha	Yamaha YZF-R6	8	(England) Nick Medd		1–3, 5–6, 10–11
Hydrex Honda	Honda CBR600RR	9	(England) Guy Martin		1–2
Hydrex Honda	Honda CBR600RR	70	(England) Tom Grant		9–11
Jenny Tinmouth Racing Honda	Honda CBR600RR	10	(England) Jenny Tinmouth	C	1–3, 5–11
Astro Racing	Honda CBR600RR	12	(England) Sam Lowes	C	1–8
Astro Racing	Kawasaki Ninja ZX-6R	17	(England) Chris Northover	C	1–4, 6–10
Astro Racing	Honda CBR600RR	24	(England) Lee Jackson		2–5, 7–11
JK Racing Yamaha	Yamaha YZF-R6	14	(Republic of Ireland) Jack Kennedy		1–4
Macadam Racing	Yamaha YZF-R6	14	(Republic of Ireland) Jack Kennedy		6–11
Macadam Racing	Honda CBR600RR	55	(England) Ashley Beech		1
Macadam Racing	Honda CBR600RR	55	(Scotland) Kev Coghlan		2–3
CS Racing Yamaha	Yamaha YZF-R6	16	(England) Craig Sproston		2, 4–5, 8, 10–11
Centurion Racing Honda	Honda CBR600RR	20	(England) Daniel Cooper		1–11
Centurion Racing Honda	Honda CBR600RR	36	(Northern Ireland) B. J. Toal		8–11
Centurion Racing Honda	Honda CBR600RR	70	(England) Tom Grant		1–7
Cringle Racing Ltd. Yamaha	Yamaha YZF-R6	21	(Isle of Man) Mark Cringle	C	1–6, 9–11
HM Plant Honda	Honda CBR600RR	22	(England) Steve Plater		1–11
AIM Racing Yamaha	Yamaha YZF-R6	25	(Scotland) Dennis Hobbs		1–4
Stacey Racing Suzuki	Suzuki GSX-R600	29	(England) Robert Busher		1
PRF Racing Suzuki	Suzuki GSX-R600	29	(Republic of Ireland) Ryan McCay		2
TAG Triumph	Triumph Daytona 675	32	(England) Peter Ward	C	1–11
TAG Triumph	Triumph Daytona 675	41	(England) Shaun Winfield		8–11
TAG Triumph	Triumph Daytona 675	96	(Australia) Paul Young		1–5, 8–11
Double M Racing Yamaha	Yamaha YZF-R6	36	(Scotland) Roy Houston		6
Rob Mac Pro Ride Yamaha	Yamaha YZF-R6	36	(Northern Ireland) B. J. Toal		7
Race Lab Yamaha	Yamaha YZF-R6	37	(England) Max Hunt	C	1–2, 5–11
AGB Transport Yamaha	Yamaha YZF-R6	43	(England) Robbie Brown	C	1–11
NCT Racing Triumph	Triumph Daytona 675	44	(England) Rob Frost		1
Node 4 Racing Yamaha	Yamaha YZF-R6	44	(England) Dan Linfoot		8–10
PTR Racing Honda	Honda CBR600RR	48	(England) Joe Dickinson		1–11
Team DCR Yamaha	Yamaha YZF-R6	60	(England) Darren Cooper		3
Team Paramed UK Yamaha	Yamaha YZF-R6	65	(Scotland) David Paton	C	3–6
Apollo Racing Yamaha	Yamaha YZF-R6	71	(England) Garth Woods		2
Premier Dispatch Kawasaki	Kawasaki Ninja ZX-6R	71	(Scotland) Craig McClelland	C	3, 6, 10–11
Wilcock Consulting Kawasaki	Kawasaki Ninja ZX-6R	72	(Scotland) Daniel Stewart		1
Steve Jordan Suzuki	Suzuki GSX-R600	73	(England) Sarah Jordan		8
Steve Jordan Suzuki	Suzuki GSX-R600	83	(England) Peter Molloy		8
CDH Racing Yamaha	Yamaha YZF-R6	74	(England) Dean Hipwell	C	1–11
BLDS Couriers Yamaha	Yamaha YZF-R6	75	(England) Craig Fitzpatrick		1–6, 8, 10–11
Interserve Racing Triumph	Triumph Daytona 675	76	(England) Ross Walter		1–11
NuttTravel.com Yamaha	Yamaha YZF-R6	77	(Northern Ireland) Marty Nutt		1–11
Arkwood Yamaha	Yamaha YZF-R6	85	(Republic of Ireland) Mark Pollock		9–11
Steadfast Racing Honda	Honda CBR600RR	86	(England) Charles Wallace	C	5, 7–11
Clwyd Heating Racing Triumph	Triumph Daytona 675	89	(Wales) David Jones	C	1–2, 4–11
UTAG Yamaha	Yamaha YZF-R6	95	(England) Jimmy Hill	C	1–2, 5–7
Team Co-ordit	Yamaha YZF-R6	118	(England) David Hallett	C	1–5, 7
Team Co-ordit	Honda CBR600RR	118	(England) Sam Lowes	C	9–10
Coca-Cola North West 200 Yamaha	Yamaha YZF-R6	200	(England) Dan Linfoot		1–5
Coca-Cola North West 200 Yamaha	Yamaha YZF-R6	200	(Australia) Brendan Roberts		7
Module Road & Race Yamaha	Yamaha YZF-R6	222	(Northern Ireland) Jonny Buckley		2

Icon	Class
C	Privateers Cup

== Season standings ==
=== Rider's standings ===
2009 Rider's standings
Pos	Rider	Bike	BHI (England)	OUL (England)	DON (England)	THR (England)	SNE (England)	KNO (Scotland)	MAL (England)	BHGP (England)	CAD (England)	CRO (England)	SIL (England)	OUL (England)	Pts
1	(England) Steve Plater	Honda	2	11	1	2	1	11	7	3	2	1	2	1	215
2	(Australia) Billy McConnell	Yamaha	1	10	3	1	Ret	4	4	2	1	2	3	19	179
3	(England) James Westmoreland	Triumph	8	9	8	4	3	2	Ret	1	3	4	1	2	171
4	(England) Ben Wilson	Kawasaki	Ret	3	4	6	8	1	2	4	Ret	3	Ret	3	137
5	(England) Daniel Cooper	Honda	12	1	10	14	2	3	8	Ret	Ret	6	8	11	104
6	(England) Ian Hutchinson	Honda					7	6	3	5	8	5	4	Ret	78
7	(England) Dan Linfoot	Yamaha	3	Ret	2	3	DNS	Inj	Inj	Ret	5	7			72
8	(England) Tom Grant	Honda	11	6	6	11	25	7	11		10	12	5	17	65
9	(South Africa) Hudson Kennaugh	Yamaha	4	DNS	14	8	4	13	Ret	Ret					58
9	(South Africa) Hudson Kennaugh	Kawasaki									17	Ret	10	4	58
10	(England) James Webb	Honda	6	Ret	5	5	5	Ret	Ret	9	12		Ret	13	57
11	(Republic of Ireland) Jack Kennedy	Yamaha	Ret	Ret	12	13		12	13	10	7	10	7	6	54
12	(Northern Ireland) Lee Johnston	Yamaha	5	Ret	9	9	DNS	5	Ret	Ret	Ret	11	Ret	5	52
13	(South Africa) Allan Jon Venter	Yamaha	Ret	Ret	15	16	10	9	18	8	4	9	Ret	7	51
14	(England) Sam Lowes	Honda	10	Ret	13	19	13	10	9	7	6	DSQ		10	50
15	(England) Craig Fitzpatrick	Yamaha	7	5	Ret	Ret	6	14		6					42
16	(Northern Ireland) Marty Nutt	Yamaha	20	7	20	21	17	16	15	Ret	9	8	9	8	40
17	(England) Chris Martin	Kawasaki	Ret	DNS	Ret	Ret	Ret	8	1	Ret	Inj	Inj	Inj	Inj	33
18	(England) Joe Dickinson	Honda	16	17	17	10	11	15	10	Ret	19	15	6	12	33
19	(Australia) Paul Young	Triumph	9	Ret	DSQ	7	9			12	14	17	Ret	14	31
20	(Northern Ireland) B. J. Toal	Yamaha							6						28
20	(Northern Ireland) B. J. Toal	Honda								14	15	13	11	9	28
21	(England) Dean Hipwell	Yamaha	15	4	24	17	14	19	12	15	21	Ret	14	24	23
22	(Scotland) Dennis Hobbs	Yamaha	Ret	2	Ret	DNS									20
23	(England) Lee Jackson	Honda		Ret	11	15	Ret		16	13	11	14	13	15	20
24	(England) Robbie Brown	Suzuki	18	12	19	12	12	18	17	11	13	Ret	Ret	Ret	20
25	(Scotland) Kev Coghlan	Honda		8	7										17
26	(Australia) Brendan Roberts	Yamaha							5						11
27	(England) Ross Walter	Triumph	14	13	16	20	16	17	Ret	19	18	19	12	16	9
28	(England) Jimmy Hill	Yamaha	13	DNS			Ret	Ret	DNS						3
29	(England) Chris Northover	Kawasaki	17	Ret	23	24		21	14	Ret					2
30	(Isle of Man) Mark Cringle	Yamaha	21	14	21	25	20	22			22	24	Ret	23	2
31	(Scotland) David Paton	Yamaha			18	22	15	DNS				18			1
32	(England) Nick Medd	Yamaha	24	15	Ret		22	24							1
33	(England) Arron Walker	Triumph											15	18	1
	(England) Peter Ward	Triumph	Ret	Ret	Ret	18	18	20	20	16	16	16	16	21	0
	(Wales) David Jones	Triumph	23	16		26	23	25	Ret	18	25	21	19	22	0
	(England) Jenny Tinmouth	Honda	25	Ret	22		21	23	19	17	24	20	18	Ret	0
	(England) Max Hunt	Yamaha	19	DNS			19	26	Ret	Ret	23			25	0
	(England) David Hallett	Yamaha	22	Ret	26	23	Ret		Ret						0
	(England) Shaun Winfield	Triumph								22	26	Ret	21	28	0
	(England) Charles Wallace	Honda					24		DNQ	Ret	27	23	22	29	0
	(England) Rikki Owen	Triumph										23	20	27	0
	(Scotland) Craig McClelland	Kawasaki			25			DNS				Ret	17	Ret	0
	(Republic of Ireland) Mark Pollock	Yamaha									20		Ret		0
	(England) Jamie Hamilton	Kawasaki												20	0
	(England) Sarah Jordan	Suzuki								20					0
	(England) Peter Molloy	Suzuki								21					0
	(England) Craig Sproston	Yamaha		DNS		DNS	DNS			DNS				26	0
	(England) David Mateer	Kawasaki												30	0
	(England) Guy Martin	Honda	Ret	Ret											0
	(England) Ashley Beech	Honda	Ret												0
	(Northern Ireland) Jonny Buckley	Yamaha		Ret											0
	(England) Robert Busher	Suzuki	Ret												0
	(England) Nick Clark	Yamaha									Ret				0
	(Scotland) Roy Houston	Yamaha						Ret							0
	(Scotland) Daniel Stewart	Kawasaki	Ret												0
	(England) Darren Cooper	Yamaha			DNQ										0
	(England) Garth Woods	Yamaha		DNQ											0
	(England) Rob Frost	Triumph	WD												0
	(Northern Ireland) Michael Dunlop	Yamaha											Ret		0
	(Republic of Ireland) Ryan McCay	Suzuki		WD											0
Pos	Rider	Bike	BHI (England)	OUL (England)	DON (England)	THR (England)	SNE (England)	KNO (Scotland)	MAL (England)	BHGP (England)	CAD (England)	CRO (England)	SIL (England)	OUL (England)	Pts

Colour	Result
Gold	Winner
Silver	Second place
Bronze	Third place
Green	Points classification
Blue	Non-points classification
Blue	Non-classified finish (NC)
Purple	Retired, not classified (Ret)
Red	Did not qualify (DNQ)
Red	Did not pre-qualify (DNPQ)
Black	Disqualified (DSQ)
White	Did not start (DNS)
White	Withdrew (WD)
White	Race cancelled (C)
Blank	Did not practice (DNP)
Blank	Did not arrive (DNA)
Blank	Excluded (EX)
