= 2010 British Supersport Championship =

The 2010 Fuchs-Silkolene British Supersport Championship season was the 23rd running of the British Supersport Championship. The championship was contested over twelve rounds, beginning on 5 April at Brands Hatch, and finishing on 10 October at Oulton Park.

With five victories and ten podiums in total, Sam Lowes added the main championship title to his Supersport Cup triumph of the previous year. Lowes took the title by 33 points ahead of James Westmoreland, with Ben Wilson finishing more than 60 points behind Westmoreland in third place in the championship standings. Two other riders won races during the season; Billy McConnell took back-to-back wins at Cadwell Park and Mallory Park, while Graeme Gowland won at Snetterton. Patrick McDougall won the secondary Privateers' Cup after dropped scores, having been outscored by Jenny Tinmouth before the scores were taken into account.

== Calendar ==
- A provisional calendar had been released on 11 October 2009, with twelve rounds listed, including a provisional date at Donington Park due to renovation of the circuit. Two months later, a revised calendar was released, with Donington Park losing the rights to hold their race on 10–12 September, after Donington Ventures Leisure Ltd was placed into administration. These dates were used for a round at Croft, with a second meeting at Cadwell Park replacing the original Croft date.

2010 Calendar
Round	Circuit	Date	Pole position	Fastest lap	Winning rider	Winning team
1	(England) Brands Hatch Indy	April 5	(Australia) Billy McConnell	(England) Sam Lowes	(England) Sam Lowes	GNS Racing
2	(England) Thruxton	April 18	(Australia) Billy McConnell	(England) Sam Lowes	(England) James Westmoreland	CAME Yamaha
3	(England) Oulton Park	May 3	(Australia) Billy McConnell	(England) Ian Hutchinson	(England) Ben Wilson	Gearlink Kawasaki
4	(England) Cadwell Park	May 23	(Australia) Billy McConnell	(Australia) Billy McConnell	(Australia) Billy McConnell	CAME Yamaha
5	(England) Mallory Park	June 27	(Australia) Billy McConnell	(England) James Westmoreland	(Australia) Billy McConnell	CAME Yamaha
6	(Scotland) Knockhill	July 4	(England) James Westmoreland	(England) Sam Lowes	(England) Sam Lowes	GNS Racing
7	(England) Snetterton	July 18	(England) James Westmoreland	(England) Ben Wilson	(England) Graeme Gowland	PTR Honda
8	(England) Brands Hatch GP	August 8	(England) James Westmoreland	(England) James Westmoreland	(England) James Westmoreland	CAME Yamaha
9	(England) Cadwell Park	August 30	(England) Sam Lowes	(Australia) Billy McConnell	(England) Sam Lowes	GNS Racing
10	(England) Croft	September 12	(England) Sam Lowes	(England) Alex Lowes	(England) Sam Lowes	GNS Racing
11	(England) Silverstone Arena GP	September 26	(England) Sam Lowes	(England) Sam Lowes	(England) Sam Lowes	GNS Racing
12	(England) Oulton Park	October 10	(England) Graeme Gowland	(England) James Westmoreland	(England) Ben Wilson	Gearlink Kawasaki

== Entry list ==
2010 Entry List
Team	Bike	No	Riders	Class	Rounds
GNS Racing	Honda CBR600RR	2	(England) Christian Iddon		11–12
GNS Racing	Honda CBR600RR	11	(England) Sam Lowes		All
GNS Racing	Honda CBR600RR	61	(Northern Ireland) Paul Jordan	C	1–8
CAME Yamaha	Yamaha YZF-R6	3	(England) James Westmoreland		All
CAME Yamaha	Yamaha YZF-R6	7	(Australia) Billy McConnell		All
East Coast Racing	Yamaha YZF-R6	4	(England) Tom Grant		1–4
East Coast Racing	Yamaha YZF-R6	9	(England) Patrick McDougall	C	All
East Coast Racing	Yamaha YZF-R6	22	(Australia) Jason O'Halloran		7–12
Gearlink Kawasaki	Kawasaki Ninja ZX-6R	4	(England) Tom Grant		8
Gearlink Kawasaki	Kawasaki Ninja ZX-6R	13	(Northern Ireland) Lee Johnston		1–4, 6
Gearlink Kawasaki	Kawasaki Ninja ZX-6R	15	(England) Ben Wilson		All
Gearlink Kawasaki	Kawasaki Ninja ZX-6R	30	(Northern Ireland) Jamie Hamilton		1–6, 10–11
Gearlink Kawasaki	Kawasaki Ninja ZX-6R	32	(England) Matthew Hoyle	C	12
Gearlink Kawasaki	Kawasaki Ninja ZX-6R	44	(England) Jesse Trayler		All
Smiths	Triumph Daytona 675	5	(England) Daniel Cooper		4–12
MAP Centurion Triumph Racing	Triumph Daytona 675	5	(England) Daniel Cooper		1–3
MAP Centurion Triumph Racing	Triumph Daytona 675	39	(South Africa) Allan Jon Venter		All
Padgetts Motorcycles	Honda CBR600RR	6	(England) Ian Hutchinson		1–11
Padgetts Motorcycles	Honda CBR600RR	45	(Australia) Glen Richards		1, 3–12
Boss (D&B) Racing	Yamaha YZF-R6	8	(England) Nick Medd		1, 4
Wilson Craig Racing	Honda CBR600RR	8	(Northern Ireland) Marshall Neill		12
Wilson Craig Racing	Honda CBR600RR	29	(England) Guy Martin		2, 8–9
Sorrymate.com	Honda CBR600RR	10	(England) Jenny Tinmouth	C	All
Sorrymate.com	Honda CBR600RR	126	(England) Bruce Wilson		4
LM Racing	Triumph Daytona 675	12	(England) Luke Mossey		1
LM Racing	Triumph Daytona 675	12	(England) Luke Mossey	C	2, 5–12
Oxford TAG Triumph	Triumph Daytona 675	13	(Northern Ireland) Lee Johnston		7–12
Oxford TAG Triumph	Triumph Daytona 675	22	(Australia) Jason O'Halloran		1–6
Oxford TAG Triumph	Triumph Daytona 675	41	(England) Shaun Winfield	C	All
Oxford TAG Triumph	Triumph Daytona 675	50	(England) Karl Harris		8–12
Oxford TAG Triumph	Triumph Daytona 675	96	(Australia) Paul Young		1–4, 11–12
Colin Appleyard/Macadam Racing	Yamaha YZF-R6	14	(Republic of Ireland) Jack Kennedy		All
Colin Appleyard/Macadam Racing	Yamaha YZF-R6	27	(England) Ashley Beech		1–2, 5–9
C S Racing	Yamaha YZF-R6	16	(England) Craig Sproston		1–4, 7–8, 11–12
Seton Interceptor	Yamaha YZF-R6	17	(Norway) Helge Spjeldnes		1, 3–8, 10–12
Seton Interceptor	Yamaha YZF-R6	17	(England) Alex Lowes		2
Seton Interceptor	Yamaha YZF-R6	19	(England) Alex Lowes		5–12
Grant Racing/Alan Duffus Motorcycles	Yamaha YZF-R6	20	(England) Scott Kelly		9, 12
Mark Cringle Racing	Triumph Daytona 675	21	(Isle of Man) Mark Cringle	C	1–4, 7, 9–12
Wilson Racing	Yamaha YZF-R6	23	(England) Marcus Woodbine	C	1–5, 7–11
Wilson Racing	Kawasaki Ninja ZX-6R	26	(England) Chris Martin		1–5, 7, 9
Royal Navy Racing	Suzuki GSX-R600	31	(Scotland) Jamie Adam		2
Mackrory Demolition Racing	Kawasaki Ninja ZX-6R	32	(England) Matthew Hoyle	C	4–11
Mackrory Demolition Racing	Kawasaki Ninja ZX-6R	99	(South Africa) Phillip Atkinson		12
Street Sweep Racing	Yamaha YZF-R6	33	(Northern Ireland) Michael Dunlop		12
Ricky Elder Racing	Yamaha YZF-R6	35	(England) Ricky Elder		12
Double "M" Racing	Yamaha YZF-R6	36	(Scotland) Roy Houston		6
Race Lab Yamaha	Yamaha YZF-R6	37	(England) Max Hunt	C	All
Hawk Racing	Triumph Daytona 675	47	(England) Rikki Owen	C	1–4, 9–12
PTR	Honda CBR600RR	48	(England) Joe Dickinson		1–9
PTR	Honda CBR600RR	81	(England) Graeme Gowland		All
Team M8	Yamaha YZF-R6	52	(Scotland) Adam Blacklock		10–12
Marks Bloom Racing	Yamaha YZF-R6	55	(Isle of Man) Dan Kneen	C	1–6, 8–12
Miltech Racing/Premier Despatch	Kawasaki Ninja ZX-6R	71	(Scotland) Craig McLelland	C	1–4, 6
Steve Jordan Motorcycles	Suzuki GSX-R600	73	(England) Sarah Jordan		1, 8, 11
Bladen Electrical	Yamaha YZF-R6	74	(England) Dean Hipwell		All
NuttTravel.com / Dawn / T+G	Yamaha YZF-R6	77	(Northern Ireland) Marty Nutt		1, 3–12
Beowulf Racing	Yamaha YZF-R6	86	(England) Charles Wallace	C	1, 6–7, 9–11
Absol Racing	Triumph Daytona 675	88	(Republic of Ireland) Emmet O'Grady		12
Clwyd Heating Racing	Triumph Daytona 675	89	(Wales) David Jones	C	All
JHS Racing	Triumph Daytona 675	144	(England) Alastair Fagan		2
Module Road & Race	Yamaha YZF-R6	222	(Northern Ireland) Jonny Buckley		6

Icon	Class
C	Privateer Class

Key
Regular Rider
Wildcard Rider
Replacement Rider

== Championship standings ==
=== Riders Championship ===
Pos	Rider	Bike	BHI (England)	THR (England)	OUL (England)	CAD (England)	MAL (England)	KNO (Scotland)	SNE (England)	BHGP (England)	CAD (England)	CRO (England)	SIL (England)	OUL (England)	Pts
1	(England) Sam Lowes	Honda	1	Ret	2	3	2	1	2	2	1	1	1	8	229
2	(England) James Westmoreland	Yamaha	2	1	Ret	2	3	6	Ret	1	2	2	2	2	196
3	(England) Ben Wilson	Kawasaki	Ret	7	1	Ret	7	2	5	6	3	Ret	6	1	135
4	(Republic of Ireland) Jack Kennedy	Yamaha	11	5	3	6	5	9	9	Ret	7	3	4	3	121
5	(Australia) Billy McConnell	Yamaha	3	4	Ret	1	1	12	8	8	Ret	Ret	11	5	115
6	(England) Graeme Gowland	Honda	5	2	Ret	4	6	8	1	3	Ret	Ret	14	Ret	105
7	(Australia) Glen Richards	Honda	DNS		5	7	4	7	4	7	6	9	5	4	105
8	(Australia) Jason O'Halloran	Triumph	4	10	DNS	10	Ret	10							94
8	(Australia) Jason O'Halloran	Yamaha							6	4	4	5	3	16	94
9	(England) Daniel Cooper	Triumph	6	Ret	4	11	13	3	3	Ret	8	6	13	18	84
10	(England) Ian Hutchinson	Honda	8	6	Ret	5	Ret	4	11	5	5	Ret	DNS		69
11	(South Africa) Allan Jon Venter	Triumph	10	14	DNS	8	8	26	15	Ret	11	8	17	12	42
12	(England) Alex Lowes	Yamaha		Ret			Ret	5	10	16	Ret	4	7	14	41
13	(Northern Ireland) Lee Johnston	Kawasaki	14	9	Ret	14		16							38
13	(Northern Ireland) Lee Johnston	Triumph							12	Ret	Ret	7	9	9	38
14	(Northern Ireland) Marty Nutt	Yamaha	12		12	13	Ret	13	7	Ret	10	17	8	DNS	37
15	(England) Tom Grant	Yamaha	9	3	6	Ret									36
15	(England) Tom Grant	Kawasaki								13					36
16	(England) Chris Martin	Kawasaki	21	8	11	12	12		14		Ret	10	DNS		29
17	(England) Luke Mossey	Triumph	13	DNS			9	11	Ret	Ret	12		Ret	10	25
18	(England) Jesse Trayler	Kawasaki	19	19	8	21	Ret	24	20	11	15	11	18	11	24
19	(Australia) Paul Young	Triumph	7	Ret	Ret	DNS							12	6	23
20	(England) Joe Dickinson	Honda	16	Ret	Ret	9	10	15	Ret	9	Ret				21
21	(England) Dean Hipwell	Yamaha	Ret	16	Ret	22	11	14	13	Ret	Ret	12	10	Ret	20
22	(England) Patrick McDougall	Yamaha	30	Ret	7	15	18	17	17	10	19	Ret	DNS	19	16
23	(Isle of Man) Dan Kneen	Yamaha	17	11	Ret	18	19	Ret		14	14	14	22	27	11
24	(Northern Ireland) Marshall Neill	Honda												7	9
25	(England) Jenny Tinmouth	Honda	24	18	9	20	17	19	18	Ret	18	15	16	20	8
26	(England) Karl Harris	Triumph								Ret	9	Ret	Ret	Ret	7
27	(England) Max Hunt	Yamaha	23	23	13	16	Ret	23	16	12	17	18	23	23	7
28	(England) Guy Martin	Honda		12						Ret	13				7
29	(Isle of Man) Mark Cringle	Triumph	22	20	10	17			21		16	Ret		21	6
30	(Northern Ireland) Jamie Hamilton	Kawasaki	25	17	Ret	DNS	14	DNS				13	Ret		5
31	(Northern Ireland) Paul Jordan	Honda	18	13	DNS	24	15	Ret	Ret	Ret					4
32	(England) Christian Iddon	Honda											Ret	13	3
33	(England) Craig Sproston	Yamaha	26	24	14	DNS			24	18		20	Ret	26	2
34	(England) Matthew Hoyle	Kawasaki				25	20	25	19	15	20	16	DSQ	15	2
35	(Wales) David Jones	Triumph	15	15	Ret	19	22	28	23	Ret	Ret	23	Ret	Ret	2
36	(Scotland) Adam Blacklock	Yamaha										19	15	30	1
37	(England) Rikki Owen	Triumph	28	25	15	26					23	25	Ret	29	1
	(England) Shaun Winfield	Triumph	Ret	21	16	23	16	Ret	22	20	21	21	20	17	0
	(England) Ashley Beech	Yamaha	20	DNS			Ret	18	Ret	17	WD				0
	(England) Marcus Woodbine	Yamaha	29	26	17	27	23		DNS	Ret	22	27			0
	(Norway) Helge Spjeldnes	Yamaha	Ret		Ret	Ret	21	22	Ret	19		26	Ret	28	0
	(Wales) Ricky Elder	Yamaha											19	Ret	0
	(Scotland) Roy Houston	Yamaha						20							0
	(Scotland) Craig McLelland	Kawasaki	27	22	Ret	DNS		21							0
	(England) Charles Wallace	Yamaha	Ret					27	Ret		24	24	21		0
	(England) Scott Kelly	Yamaha									Ret	22	DNS	Ret	0
	(Northern Ireland) Michael Dunlop	Yamaha												22	0
	(South Africa) Phillip Atkinson	Kawasaki												24	0
	(Republic of Ireland) Emmet O'Grady	Triumph												25	0
	(Scotland) Jamie Adam	Suzuki		27											0
	(England) Sarah Jordan	Suzuki	Ret							DNS					0
	(England) Alastair Fagan	Triumph		Ret											0
	(England) Bruce Wilson	Honda				Ret									0
	(England) Nick Medd	Yamaha	DNS			DNS									0
	(Northern Ireland) Jonny Buckley	Yamaha						DNS							0
Pos	Rider	Bike	BHI (England)	THR (England)	OUL (England)	CAD (England)	MAL (England)	KNO (Scotland)	SNE (England)	BHGP (England)	CAD (England)	CRO (England)	SIL (England)	OUL (England)	Pts

Colour	Result
Gold	Winner
Silver	Second place
Bronze	Third place
Green	Points classification
Blue	Non-points classification
Blue	Non-classified finish (NC)
Purple	Retired, not classified (Ret)
Red	Did not qualify (DNQ)
Red	Did not pre-qualify (DNPQ)
Black	Disqualified (DSQ)
White	Did not start (DNS)
White	Withdrew (WD)
White	Race cancelled (C)
Blank	Did not practice (DNP)
Blank	Did not arrive (DNA)
Blank	Excluded (EX)

=== Privateers Championship ===
Pos	Rider	Bike	BHI (England)	THR (England)	OUL (England)	CAD (England)	MAL (England)	KNO (Scotland)	SNE (England)	BHGP (England)	CAD (England)	CRO (England)	SIL (England)	OUL (England)	Total	Drop	Pts
1	(England) Patrick McDougall	Yamaha	30	Ret	7	15	18	17	17	10	19	Ret	DNS	19	155		155
2	(Isle of Man) Dan Kneen	Yamaha	17	11	Ret	18	19	Ret		14	14	14	22	27	150		150
3	(England) Jenny Tinmouth	Honda	24	18	9	20	17	19	18	Ret	18	15	16	20	165	20	145
4	(England) Max Hunt	Yamaha	23	23	13	16	Ret	23	16	12	17	18	23	23	154	17	137
5	(England) Shaun Winfield	Triumph	Ret	21	16	23	16	Ret	22	20	21	21	20	17	121	8	113
6	(England) Luke Mossey	Triumph		DNS			9	11	Ret	Ret	12		Ret	10	100		100
7	(England) Matthew Hoyle	Kawasaki				25	20	25	19	15	20	16	DSQ	15	97		97
8	(Isle of Man) Mark Cringle	Triumph	22	20	10	17			21		16	Ret		21	93		93
9	(Wales) David Jones	Triumph	15	15	Ret	19	22	28	23	Ret	Ret	23	Ret	Ret	87		87
10	(Northern Ireland) Paul Jordan	Honda	18	13	DNS	24	15	Ret	Ret	Ret					64		64
11	(England) Rikki Owen	Triumph	28	25	15	26					23	25	Ret	29	53		53
12	(England) Marcus Woodbine	Yamaha	29	26	17	27	23		DNS	Ret	22	27			48		48
13	(England) Charles Wallace	Yamaha	Ret					27	Ret		24	24	21		39		39
14	(Scotland) Craig McLelland	Kawasaki	27	22	Ret	DNS		21							31		31
Pos	Rider	Bike	BHI (England)	THR (England)	OUL (England)	CAD (England)	MAL (England)	KNO (Scotland)	SNE (England)	BHGP (England)	CAD (England)	CRO (England)	SIL (England)	OUL (England)	Total	Drop	Pts

Colour	Result
Gold	Winner
Silver	Second place
Bronze	Third place
Green	Points classification
Blue	Non-points classification
Blue	Non-classified finish (NC)
Purple	Retired, not classified (Ret)
Red	Did not qualify (DNQ)
Red	Did not pre-qualify (DNPQ)
Black	Disqualified (DSQ)
White	Did not start (DNS)
White	Withdrew (WD)
White	Race cancelled (C)
Blank	Did not practice (DNP)
Blank	Did not arrive (DNA)
Blank	Excluded (EX)
