= Chris Martin (motorcyclist) =

British motorcycle racer (born 1981)

- Nationality: British
- Born: 24 January 1981 (age 45); Beverley, Humberside, England
- Current team: Gearlink Kawasaki
- Bike number: 26

Chris Martin (born 24 January 1981) is a British superbike rider who is currently competing in the British Superbike Championship for the Gearlink Kawasaki team. Martin is a previous British Superbike Privateers Cup Champion in 2006.

== Career ==
=== Starting out ===
Martin started out doing the 125cc Aprilia challenge, spending three years between 1997 and 1999. Martin then spent three years in the British 125cc Championship from 2000 to 2003.

=== British Superbike Championship 2004–07 ===
Martin then moved from the 125cc machines into the Superbike class, Martin rode a Privateer machine throughout his time in BSB, he finished sixth and second in the championship in the first two years, but Martin moved to PR Branson Honda, and became the privateer champion of 2006. Martin switched to Red Viper Racing for BSB for 2007 without much success.

=== British Supersport Championship 2008–09 ===
Martin moved down to the supersport class for 2008 joining the Gearlink Kawasaki team, finishing in sixth on 99 points. Martin continued with the Gearlink Kawasaki team for the 2009 season. The 2009 season was a struggle for Martin, as he only finished two of the nine races. Despite this, Martin claimed his first win in the British Supersport class at Mallory Park, that he completed crashing heavily at Brands Hatch.

== Career stats ==
* Correct as of 19 July 2010

=== British Superbike Championship ===
Year	Class	Bike	1		2		3		4		5		6		7		8		9		10		11		12		13		Pos	Pts
Year	Class	Bike	R1	R2	R1	R2	R1	R2	R1	R2	R1	R2	R1	R2	R1	R2	R1	R2	R1	R2	R1	R2	R1	R2	R1	R2	R1	R2	Pos	Pts
2004	BSB	Suzuki	SIL; 19	SIL; 17	BHI; 18	BHI; Ret	SNE; 15	SNE; 19	OUL; 17	OUL; 17	MON; 16	MON; 18	THR; 20	THR; 17	BHGP; Ret	BHGP; 19	KNO; 13	KNO; Ret	MAL; DNS	MAL; DNS	CRO; 17	CRO; 16	CAD; 15	CAD; 17	OUL; 20	OUL; 16	DON; 13	DON; 16	28th	8
2006	BSB	Honda	BHI; 19	BHI; 21	DON; Ret	DON; 9	THR; 19	THR; 17	OUL; 21	OUL; 21	MON; C	MON; C	MAL; 13	MAL; 20	SNE; 15	SNE; 16	KNO; 21	KNO; 19	OUL; 16	OUL; 17	CRO; 16	CRO; 15	CAD	CAD	SIL; 15	SIL; 20	BHGP; 10	BHGP; 14	21st	31

=== British Supersport Championship ===
Year	Bike	1	2	3	4	5	6	7	8	9	10	11	12	Pos	Pts	Ref
2009	Kawasaki	BHI; Ret	OUL; DNS	DON; Ret	THR; Ret	SNE; Ret	KNO; 8	MAL; 1	BHGP; Ret	CAD	CRO	SIL	OUL	16th	33	
2010	Kawasaki	BHI; 21	THR; 8	OUL; 11	CAD; 12	MAL; 12	KNO	SNE; 14	BHGP	CAD	CRO	SIL	OUL	13th	23	
