= James Westmoreland =

British motorcycle racer

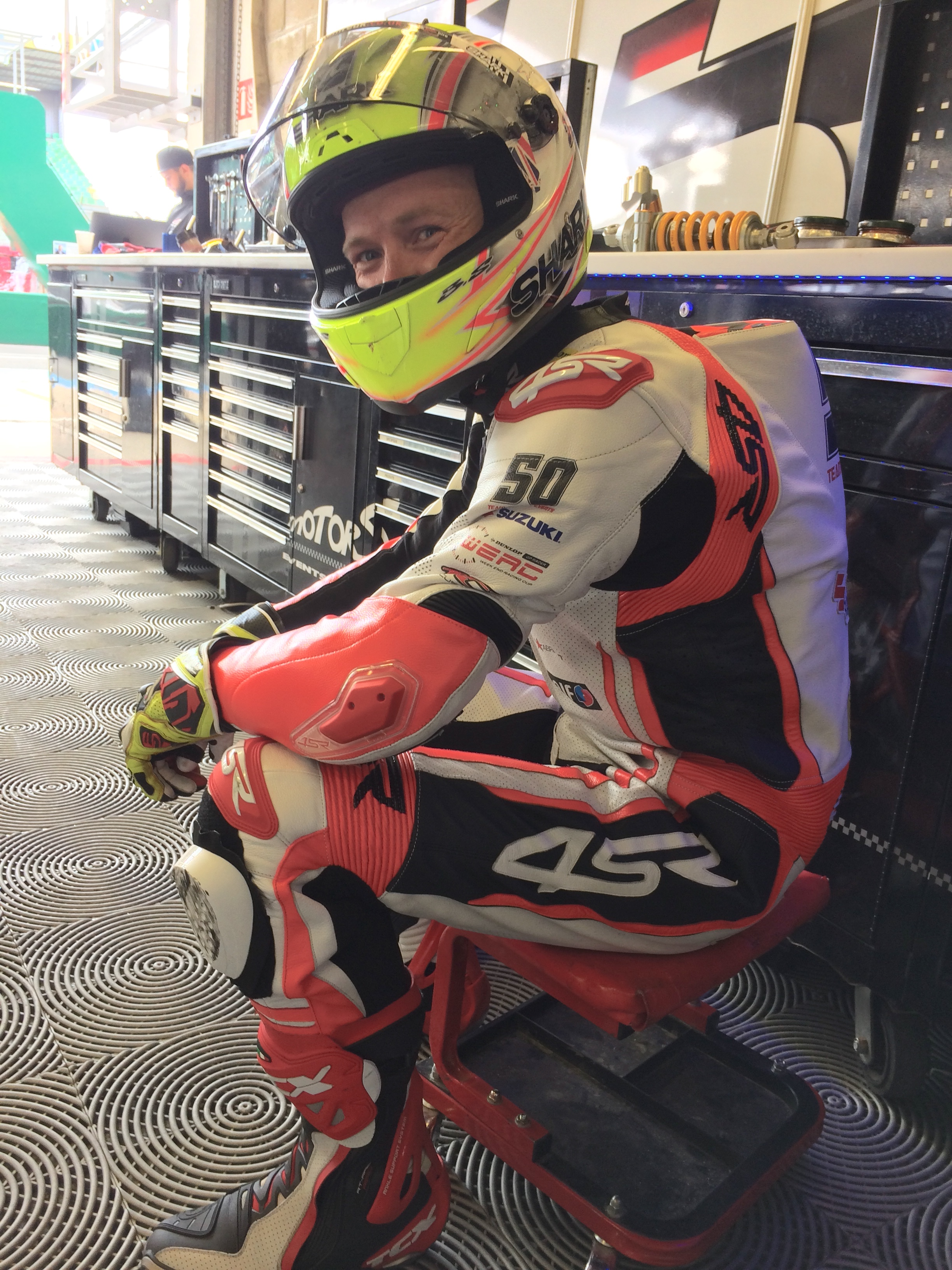
- Born: 24 June 1988 (age 38); Hull, East Riding of Yorkshire
- Current team: Honda Viltais Racing
- Bike number: 3
- Website: jameswestmoreland.com

James Westmoreland (born June 24, 1988 at Wyton, East Yorkshire), also known as 'Westy', is an English motorcycle racer. In the 2024 season, he rode a Honda CBR 1000RR in the World Endurance Championship for Honda Viltais Racing.

Westmoreland competed in the British 125 cc and the British Superbike Championship. After finishing twice as runner-up in the competitive British 125GP field, he moved into Supersport in 2007, where he claimed the Cup Championship in his debut season. A move into the main supersport class in 2008 saw him spend several seasons running at the front, taking fourteen podiums and four wins with a best Championship standing of second (just behind eventual World Supersport Champion Sam Lowes).

In 2012, Westmoreland competed in the British Superbike Championship with Team WFR and achieved the riders cup for that season, finishing seventh in the championship and narrowly missing out on the Showdown.

In 2016, Westmoreland competed in the British Supersport Championship aboard a Yamaha YZF-R6.

In 2018, Westmoreland finished third in the British Supersport Championship with Gearlink Kawasaki, with several podium finishes, including a win at the final round at Brands Hatch. Westmoreland rejoined Gearlink Kawasaki for the remainder of the 2019 British Supersport Championship.

For the 2019-2020 World Endurance Championship, Westmoreland joined Team #50 Motors Events aboard the Suzuki GSX-R1000.

Westmoreland previously took victory at the 24 Hours Le Mans in April 2019 at Team 50 Motors Events, finishing first in the Superstock class and seventh overall.. The Motors Events 50 team also finished a strong third in the Bol D'or 24 hour.

For 2020, Westmoreland would ride for Gearlink Kawasaki in the British Supersport Championship.

Following his strong season finish of third in the Supersport Championship, Westmoreland made the permanent move to the World Endurance Championship, where he remains for his fourth season with Viltais Racing who in 2023 made the change from Yamaha to Honda.

== Career ==
=== Early career ===
Westmoreland began racing motocross in 1995, and switched to circuit racing in 2001. He was runner-up in the British 125cc championship in both 2005 and 2006.

=== British Supersport Championship 2007-10 ===
In 2007, Westmoreland moved up to the British Supersport Championship with the Centurion Racing team. Entered in the Cup class for private teams, he came ninth overall in the standings with a best of fourth at Thruxton, winning the privateers' cup that year. In 2008, he finished fourth overall, with second places at Knockhill and Croft.

In 2009, Westmoreland set up his own JW Racing team just two weeks before the season, to campaign Glen Richards' 2008 championship winning Triumph Daytona 675. He started the season slowly with midpoint finishes, but he came into form at Snetterton, grabbing a 3rd place; results continued to improve with a 2nd at Knockhill, and his first supersport win came at Brands Hatch GP. A second win at Silverstone sealed his third place in the championship.

=== British Superbike Championship ===
2015: 19th - JG Speedfit Kawasaki

2014: 13th - Buildbase BMW

2013: 5th - Buildbase BMW

2012: 7th - Team WFR Honda

2011: 14th - Motorpoint Yamaha

=== British Supersport Championship ===
2020: Gearlink Kawasaki

2019: Gearlink Kawasaki

2018: 3rd Gearlink Kawasaki

2016: Came BPT Yamaha

2010: 2nd - Came Yamaha

2009: 3rd - JW Racing Triumph

2008: 4th - Centurion Honda

2007: 7th - Centurion Honda

=== British Supersport Cup Championship ===
2007: CHAMPION - Centurion Honda

=== World Supersport Championship ===
2010: 11th - British Round (Silverstone)

2009: 11th - British Round (Donington Park)

=== British 125GP Championship ===
2006: 2nd - KRP Honda

2005: 2nd - KRP Honda

2004: 28th - Team Nvidia Honda

=== Junior Championships ===
2005: CHAMPION - ACU Academy Championship

2003: MRO 125cc Championship

2002: 5th - Aprilia Superteen Championship

=== Other achievements ===
2005: Spanish 125cc Championship

2001: Road Racing

1995-2000: Schoolboy Motor-cross

== Career statistics ==
Stats correct as of 14 September 2013

=== All time ===
Series	Years active	Races	Poles	Podiums	**Wins**	**2nd place**	**3rd place**	Fast Laps	Titles
British Supersport	^{2007–2010}	49	6	18	4	10	4	7	0
British Superbikes	^{2011−}	57	2	0	0	0	0	2	0
BSB Evo Class (**E**)	^{2011}	2	0	2	0	2	0	0	0
Total		108^{1}	8	18	4	10	4	9	0

1. – Total includes all British Superbike Championship rides, riding in the Evolution class doesn't count as a separate ride.

=== By championship ===
==== British Supersport Championship ====
Year	Bike	1	2	3	4	5	6	7	8	9	10	11	12	13	Pos	Pts	Ref
2007	Honda	BHGP; 10	THR; 4	SIL; 13	OUL; 18	SNE; 8	MON; 8	KNO; 16	OUL; 7	MAL; 12	CRO; 8	CAD; 13	DON; 7	BHI; 9	9th	69	
2008	Honda	THR; 15	OUL; 11	BHGP; 4	DON; 10	SNE; 3	MAL; 6	OUL; 6	KNO; 2	CAD; 5	CRO; 2	SIL; 5	BHI; 4		4th	136	
2009	Triumph	BHI; 8	OUL; 9	DON; 8	**THR**; 4	SNE; 3	KNO; 2	MAL; Ret	**BHGP**; 1	CAD; 3	CRO; 4	**SIL**; 1	OUL'; 2		**2nd**	**137**	
2010	Yamaha	BHI; 2	THR; 1	OUL; Ret	CAD; 2	MAL; 3	**KNO**; 6	**SNE**; Ret	**BHGP**; 1	CAD; 2	CRO; 2	SIL; 2	OUL; 2		**2nd**	**196**	

==== Supersport World Championship ====
Year	Make	1	2	3	4	5	6	7	8	9	10	11	12	13	14	Pos	Pts	Ref
2009	Triumph	AUS	QAT	SPA	NED	ITA	RSA	USA	SMR	GBR; 11	CZE	GER	ITA	FRA	POR	27th	5	

==== British Superbike Championship ====
(key) (Races in bold indicate pole position; races in italics indicate fastest lap)

Year	Class	Bike	1		2		3			4		5		6			7			8			9			10		11		12			Pos	Pts	Ref
Year	Class	Bike	R1	R2	R1	R2	R1	R2	R3	R1	R2	R1	R2	R1	R2	R3	R1	R2	R3	R1	R2	R3	R1	R2	R3	R1	R2	R1	R2	R1	R2	R3	Pos	Pts	Ref
2011	BSB	Yamaha	BHI; Ret	BHI; Ret	OUL; 14	OUL; 13	CRO; 12	CRO; 12		THR; 26	THR; 12	KNO; 7	KNO; 5	SNE; 14	SNE; DNS		OUL; 8	OUL; C		BHGP; 6	BHGP; 25	BHGP; 14	CAD	CAD	CAD								14th	72	
2011	BSB	Honda																								DON; 11	DON; 12	SIL; 12	SIL; Ret	BHGP; 14	BHGP; 8	BHGP; 10	14th	72	
2011	E	Honda																								DON; 11	DON; 12	SIL	SIL	BHGP	BHGP	BHGP	15th	88	
2012	BSB	Honda	BHI; 8	BHI; C	THR; 9	THR; 9	OUL; 10	OUL; 14	OUL; 16	SNE; 12	SNE; 9	KNO; 11	KNO; 5	OUL; 5	OUL; 11	OUL; 9	BHGP; Ret	BHGP; 10		CAD; 8	CAD; 6		DON; 5	DON; 6		ASS; 8	ASS; 8	SIL; 5	SIL; 9	BHGP; 4	BHGP; Ret	BHGP; 6	7th	182	
2013	BSB	BMW	BHI; Ret	BHI; 4	THR; 9	THR; 4	OUL; 7	OUL; Ret		KNO; 6	KNO; 6	SNE; 6	SNE; 5	BHGP; 4	BHGP; 6		OUL; 22	OUL; 9	OUL; 6	CAD; 10	CAD; 9		**DON**; 5	**DON**; 4		ASS; 8	ASS; 5	SIL; 8	SIL; 9	BHGP; 8	BHGP; 4	BHGP; 7	5th	564	

Year	Make	1			2			3			4			5			6			7			8			9			10			11			12			Pos	Pts
Year	Make	R1	R2	R3	R1	R2	R3	R1	R2	R3	R1	R2	R3	R1	R2	R3	R1	R2	R3	R1	R2	R3	R1	R2	R3	R1	R2	R3	R1	R2	R3	R1	R2	R3	R1	R2	R3	Pos	Pts
2014	BMW	BHI; 10	BHI; 7		OUL; 8	OUL; 6		SNE; Ret	SNE; Ret		KNO; 10	KNO; Ret		BHGP	BHGP		THR	THR		OUL	OUL	OUL	CAD; 11	CAD; Ret		DON; 10	DON; 8		ASS; 14	ASS; 10		SIL; 8	SIL; 10		BHGP; 9	BHGP; 9	BHGP; 14	13th	96

Year	Make	1		2		3			4		5		6			7		8			9			10		11		12			Pos	Pts
Year	Make	R1	R2	R1	R2	R1	R2	R3	R1	R2	R1	R2	R1	R2	R3	R1	R2	R1	R2	R3	R1	R2	R3	R1	R2	R1	R2	R1	R2	R3	Pos	Pts
2015	Kawasaki	DON; Ret	DON; Ret	BHI; 17	BHI; 17	OUL; 13	OUL; 11		SNE; Ret	SNE; Ret	KNO; 9	KNO; 8	BHGP; 9	BHGP; 14		THR; 3	THR; Ret	CAD; 13	CAD; 9		OUL; Ret	OUL; 10	OUL; 14	ASS	ASS	SIL	SIL	BHGP	BHGP	BHGP	19th	66
2017	Kawasaki	DON; DNS	DON; 16	BHI; 17	BHI; Ret	OUL; 20	OUL; 17		KNO; 13	KNO; 18	SNE; 16	SNE; 17	BHGP; 18	BHGP; Ret		THR; 18	THR; 15	CAD; 19	CAD; 16		SIL; 14	SIL; 14	SIL; 4	OUL; 14	OUL; Ret	ASS; 20	ASS; Ret	BHGP; 14	BHGP; 18	BHGP; 21	20th	25

Year	Bike	1			2			3			4			5			6			7			8			9			10			11			Pos	Pts
Year	Bike	R1	R2	R3	R1	R2	R3	R1	R2	R3	R1	R2	R3	R1	R2	R3	R1	R2	R3	R1	R2	R3	R1	R2	R3	R1	R2	R3	R1	R2	R3	R1	R2	R3	Pos	Pts
2024	Honda	NAV	NAV		OUL	OUL	OUL	DON	DON	DON	KNO	KNO	KNO	SNE	SNE	SNE	BRH	BRH	BRH	THR	THR	THR	CAD	CAD	CAD	OUL	OUL	OUL	DON; 21	DON; 19	DON; 17	BRH; 10	BRH; 18	BRH; 16	24th	12

==== FIM Endurance World Cup ====
Year	Team	Bike	Tyre	Rider	Pts	TC
2025	(France) 3ART Best of Bike	Yamaha YZF-R1	**D**	(United Kingdom) James Westmoreland (Italy) Doriano Vietti (Austria) Jan Mohr (France) Alexy Negrier	56*	5th*
