= Seton Tuning =

Motorcycle company in England

- Type: Private
- Industry: Motorcycle racing
- Founded: 2006; 20 years ago in Essex, England
- Headquarters: Ballast Quay works Fingringhoe Colchester, Essex CO5 7DB
- Number of locations: 1
- Key people: Phil Seton
- Products: Tuning
- Website: www.seton-tuning.co.uk

Seton Tuning Ltd. (pronounced Seat-on) is a Colchester based motorcycle and race preparation company. Seton Tuning has a partnership with Linxcel Europe Limited named Linxcel-Seton Tuning Motorcycle Race Team which is currently running in The British Supersport 600 Championship.

== History ==
Phil Seton, Is a team owner and the director of Seton Tuning. He won the MRO Supersport 600 Championship in 2006 and is responsible for the machines that won the same championship in 2007 and 2008.

In 2015 Dean Ellison raced for Seton Tuning and won the No Limits Endurance Championship and the overall win at Donington.

== Seton tuning riders ==
- Phil Seton (2006-2020)
- Hudson Kennaugh (2009)
- James Webb (2009)
- Danny Buchan (2013)
- Dean Ellison (2015)
- Bob Collins (2016-2017)
- Patrick Sheridan (2017)
- Bram Lambrechts (2019)

== See also ==
- British Supersport Championship
- Motorcycle racing
