= 2011 Ulster Grand Prix =

Motorcycle race in Northern Ireland

(United Kingdom) 2011 Ulster Grand Prix
Race details
Date	7–13 August 2011
Location	Dundrod Circuit, County Antrim, Northern Ireland
Course	Road Course; 7.401 mi (11.911 km)

The 2011 Ulster Grand Prix races were held on the Dundrod Circuit between 7–13 August 2011 in County Antrim, Northern Ireland.

== Race results ==
=== Race 6; 2011 1000cc Superbike Race 2 final standings ===
Saturday 13 August 2011 6 laps – 44.406 miles Dundrod Circuit

Rank	Rider	Team	Time	Speed
1	(England) Guy Martin	Suzuki 1000cc	20:43.973	128.168 mph
2	(Scotland) Keith Amor	Honda 999cc	+ 2.956	127.864 mph
3	(Northern Ireland) William Dunlop	Honda 1000cc	+ 3.073	127.852 mph
4	(Australia) Cameron Donald	Honda 1000cc	+ 3.357	127.823 mph
5	(New Zealand) Bruce Anstey	Honda 1000cc	+ 4.103	127.747 mph
6	(England) Gary Johnson	Honda 1000cc	+ 21.896	125.951 mph
7	(Northern Ireland) Michael Dunlop	Kawasaki 1000cc	+ 28.623	125.285 mph
8	(Isle of Man) Conor Cummins	Kawasaki 1000cc	+ 36.640	124.500 mph
9	(Northern Ireland) Adrian Archibald	Kawasaki 1000cc	+ 39.890	124.185 mph
10	(Australia) David Johnson	Kawasaki 1000cc	+ 46.355	123.563 mph

Fastest Lap: William Dunlop, 3' 24.159 130.506 mph on lap 4

== See also ==
- North West 200
- Isle of Man TT
- Manx Grand Prix
