= Daniel Cooper (motorcyclist) =

British motorcycle racer

- Nationality: British
- Born: 26 May 1987 (age 39); Stroud, England, United Kingdom
- Current team: Dan Cooper Motorsports
- Bike number: 20

Daniel Cooper is a Grand Prix motorcycle racer from United Kingdom. He currently races in the National Superstock 1000 Championship, aboard a BMW S1000RR.

== Career statistics ==
=== By season ===
Season	Class	Motorcycle	Team	Race	Win	Podium	Pole	FLap	Pts	Plcd
2006	125cc	Honda	KRP/dancoopers96.com	1	0	0	0	0	0	NC
Total				**1**	**0**	**0**	**0**	**0**	**0**	

=== Races by year ===
(key)

Year	Class	Bike	1	2	3	4	5	6	7	8	9	10	11	12	13	14	15	16	Pos.	Pts
2006	125cc	Honda	SPA	QAT	TUR	CHN	FRA	ITA	CAT	NED	GBR; Ret	GER	CZE	MAL	AUS	JPN	POR	VAL	NC	0

=== British Supersport Championship ===
==== Races by year ====
(key) (Races in bold indicate pole position, races in italics indicate fastest lap)

Year	Bike	1	2	3	4	5	6	7	8	9	10	11	12	Pos	Pts
2009	Honda	BHI; 12	OUL; 1	DON; 10	THR; 14	SNE; 2	KNO; 3	MAL; 8	BHGP; Ret	CAD; Ret	CRO; 6	SIL; 8	OUL; 11	**5th**	**104**
2010	Triumph	BHI; 6	THR; Ret	OUL; 4	CAD; 11	MAL; 13	KNO; 3	SNE; 3	BHGP; Ret	CAD; 8	CRO; 6	SIL; 13	OUL; 18	9th	84

Year	Bike	1		2		3		4		5		6		7		8		9		10		11		12		Pos	Pts
Year	Bike	R1	R2	R1	R2	R1	R2	R1	R2	R1	R2	R1	R2	R1	R2	R1	R2	R1	R2	R1	R2	R1	R2	R1	R2	Pos	Pts
2012	Suzuki/Kawasaki	BHI; 10	BHI; 11	THR; Ret	THR; Ret	OUL	OUL	SNE	SNE	KNO; 17	KNO; 10	OUL; 10	OUL; 11	BHGP; Ret	BHGP; 13	CAD	CAD	DON	DON	ASS; 24	ASS; 17	SIL	SIL	BHGP	BHGP	22nd	28.5
