= British Superbike Championship Support Series =

Motorcycle road race since 1989

The British Supersport Championship, National Superstock 1000 & 600 and the British Motostar Championship are the four main championship series that are run as support races alongside the British Superbike Championship. In 2012 the Motostar category replaced the defunct 125cc category that had been running since the start of the British Superbike Championship in 1988, Motostar was open to both 125 and 250 machines similar to Moto 3 machines. The Supersport racing started in 1989 and is a class comprising 600cc Motorcycles that are allowed racing modifications and custom tuning. It wasn't until 2000 that the Superstock 1000 category replaced the defunct 250cc category, with the Superstock 600 championship being the newest addition on the support series in 2008. In 2010 the Superstock 1000 and Superstock 600 categories also supported the British rounds of the Superbike World Championship and the Moto GP both at Silverstone.

== British Supersport Championship ==
British Supersport Championship
- Sport: Motorcycle sport
- No. of teams: 6 manufacturers (Ducati, Kawasaki, MV Agusta, Suzuki, Triumph, Yamaha)
- Most recent champion: Jack Kennedy

British Supersport Championship is a support series to the British Superbike Championship (BSB). Until 2011 the British Supersport championship ran a single race at every BSB event, since then it has been expanded and now runs two rounds every BSB event. The machines are 600cc production bikes that are allowed a set amount of tuning and aftermarket parts. The BSS championship is seen as a stepping stone for the younger talent to go up to the British Superbike Championship, riders such as: Tom Sykes, Cal Crutchlow and Leon Camier having come through this championship in the past.

=== Scoring system ===
Current points system
Position	1	2	3	4	5	6	7	8	9	10	11	12	13	14	15
Points	25	20	16	13	11	10	9	8	7	6	5	4	3	2	1

=== Current bike models ===
- Ducati Panigale V2
- Honda CBR600RR
- Kawasaki Ninja ZX-6R
- MV Agusta F3 800
- Suzuki GSX-R750
- Triumph Daytona 765 R
- Yamaha YZF-R6

=== British Supersport champions ===
Year	Class	Rider	Motorcycle	Notes	Ref
1989	Supersport 600	Rodney Knapp	Yamaha		
1990	Supersport 600	John Reynolds	Kawasaki		
1991	Supersport 600	Ian Simpson	Yamaha		
1992	Supersport 600	Phil Borley	Honda		
1993	Supersport 600	Jim Moodie	Honda		
1994	Supersport 600	Ian Simpson	Honda		
1995	Supersport 600	Mike Edwards	Honda		
1996	Supercup Thunderbike	Dave Heal	Honda		
1997	Supersport 600	Paul Brown	Honda		
1998	Supersport 600	John Crawford	Suzuki		
1999	Supersport 600	John Crawford	Suzuki		
2000	Supersport	Jim Moodie	Yamaha		
2001	Supersport	Karl Harris	Suzuki		
2002	Supersport	Stuart Easton	Ducati		
2003	Supersport	Karl Harris	Honda		
2004	Supersport	Karl Harris	Honda	Harris Finished on 232 points with 6 wins and 2 DNFs from 13 rides	
2005	Supersport	Leon Camier	Honda	Camier finished with 202 points including 4 wins and 2 DNFs in 13 racers	
2006	Supersport	Cal Crutchlow	Honda	Crutchlow won the title easily with 242 Points 6 wins and 2 DNFs from 13 races	
2007	Supersport	Michael Laverty	Suzuki		
2008	Supersport	Glen Richards	Triumph	Richards collected a total of 240 points with 4 wins and 0 DNFs from 12 races	
2009	Supersport	Steve Plater	Honda	215 Points with 4 wins	
2010	Supersport	Sam Lowes	Honda		
2011	Supersport	Alastair Seeley	Suzuki		
2012	Supersport	Glen Richards	Triumph		
2013	Supersport	Stuart Easton	Yamaha		
2014	Supersport	Billy McConnell	Triumph		
2015	Supersport	Luke Stapleford	Triumph		
2016	Supersport	Tarran Mackenzie	Kawasaki		
2017	Supersport	Keith Farmer	Yamaha		
2018	Supersport	Jack Kennedy	Yamaha		
2019	Supersport	Jack Kennedy	Yamaha		
2020	Supersport	Rory Skinner	Yamaha		
2021	Supersport	Jack Kennedy	Kawasaki		
2022	Supersport	Jack Kennedy	Yamaha		
2023	Supersport	Ben Currie	Ducati		
2024	Supersport	Jack Kennedy	Honda		
2025	Supersport	Rhys Irwin	Suzuki		

== British GP2 Cup ==
British GP2 Cup
- Sport: Motorcycle sport
- First season: 2018
- No. of teams: 4 manufacturers (Kalex, Spirit, Harris, Chassis Factory)
- Most recent champion: Jack Scott

The British GP2 Cup is a support series to the British Superbike Championship (BSB).

Founded in 2018, the series races alongside the British Supersport Championship, although the two have separate classifications.

The bikes have prototype chassis like those used in Moto2 and use full-slick tyres (unlike Supersport), but their engines must adhere to Superstock600 regulations, with an output limit of 128 hp.

Mason Law is the reigning champion having claimed the 2020 title racing for Spirit Moto Corsa. The previous two champions Kyle Ryde (2019) and Josh Owens (2018) raced for Team Kovara Projects RS Racing aboard Kalex machinery.

=== British GP2 Cup winners ===
Year	Rider	Motorcycle	Ref
2018	Josh Owens	Kalex	
2019	Kyle Ryde	Kalex	
2020	Mason Law	Spirit	
2021	Charlie Nesbitt	Kalex	
2022	Jack Scott	Kalex	
2023	Cameron Fraser	CFR	
2024	Owen Jenner	Krämer	

== National Superstock 1000 Championship ==
National Superstock 1000 Championship
- Sport: Motorcycle sport
- No. of teams: 6 manufacturers (Aprilia, BMW, Honda, Kawasaki, Suzuki, Yamaha)
- Most recent champion: Davey Todd

The National Superstock 1000 Championship is a support race for the British Superbike Championship, the superstock 1000 meaning that all the bikes have to be of a stock spec. This means that racing is much cheaper than in other categories as such this category gets many more entrants than any other class on the BSB grid.

=== National Superstock 1000 champions ===
Year	Rider	Motorcycle	Notes	Ref
2001	Paul Young		236 Points	
2002	David Jefferies		237 Points	
2003	Andy Tinsley		178 Points	
2004	Danny Beaumont		214 Points	
2005	Lee Jackson		194 Points	
2006	Brendan Roberts		216 Points	
2007	Glen Richards	Yamaha	223 Points	
2008	Steve Brogan	Honda	273 points & Won 8 of the 12 races	
2009	Alastair Seeley	Suzuki	241 Points, won the first 9 meetings, moving to Superbike class for the last 2 races	
2010	Jon Kirkham	BMW		
2011	Richard Cooper	BMW		
2011	Richard Cooper	BMW		
2012	Keith Farmer	Kawasaki		
2013	Hudson Kennaugh	Kawasaki		
2014	Danny Buchan	Kawasaki		
2015	Joshua Elliott	Kawasaki		
2016	Taylor Mackenzie	BMW		
2017	Danny Buchan	Kawasaki		
2018	Keith Farmer	BMW		
2019	Richard Cooper	Suzuki		
2020	Chrissy Rouse	BMW		
2021	Tom Neave	Honda		
2022	Davey Todd	Honda	286 Points	
2023	Dan Linfoot	Honda		
2024	Davey Todd	BMW		
2025	Ilya Mikhalchik	BMW		

== National Superstock 600 Championship ==
National Superstock 600 Championship
- Sport: Motorcycle sport
- No. of teams: 4 manufacturers (Kawasaki, MV Agusta, Triumph, Yamaha)
- Most recent champion: Max Cook

The National Superstock 600 Championship is a support race for the British Superbike Championship. Superstock 600 meaning that all the bikes have to be an essentially stock specification, based on the bikes that are produced for public road use, with a maximum engine size of 600cc.

=== National Superstock 600 champions ===
Year	Rider	Motorcycle	Notes	Ref
2008	Lee Johnston	Yamaha	207 with 1 win	
2009	Jamie Hamilton	Kawasaki	165 with 2 wins	
2010	Josh Day	Yamaha	3 wins, 5 pole positions	
2011	Keith Farmer	Yamaha		
2012	Lee Jackson	Kawasaki		
2013	Luke Hedger	Kawasaki		
2014	Kyle Ryde	Yamaha		
2015	Mason Law	Kawasaki		
2016	Jordan Weaving	Kawasaki		
2017	Dan Stamper	Yamaha		
2018	Ryan Vickers	Yamaha		
2019	Korie McGreevy	Triumph		
2020	Ben Luxton	Kawasaki		
2021	Jack Nixon	Yamaha		
2022	Max Cook	Yamaha		
2023	Asher Durham	Kawasaki		

== Moto3 Motostar British Championship ==
Moto3 Motostar British Championship
- Sport: Motorcycle sport
- No. of teams: 3 manufacturers (KTM, Honda, Mahindra)
- Most recent champions: Brandon Paasch; Scott Ogden (Standard)

The British Motostar Championship was a support race for the British Superbike Championship, this class developed from the defunct 125cc category. At the end of the 2015 season the 125cc class ended and the newer 250cc Moto3 bikes were allowed in this class as a way of a stepping stone to the Moto3 class at world championship level which runs 250cc Moto3 bikes.

=== 125cc Motostar British champions ===
Year	Class	Rider	Motorcycle	Notes	Ref
1996	125cc	Robin Appleyard		306 Points	
1997	125cc	Darren Barton	Honda	204 Points	
1998	125cc	Chris Palmer	Honda	159 Points	
1999	125cc	Darren Barton	Honda	205 Points	
2000	125cc	Kenny Tibble	Honda	168 Points	
2001	125cc	Leon Camier		178 Points, beating Casey Stoner to the title by 3 points	
2002	125cc	Chris Martin		289 Points	
2003	125cc	Michael Wilcox		183 Points	
2004	125cc	Christian Elkin		224 Points	
2005	125cc	Christian Elkin		197 Points	
2006	125cc	Daniel Cooper		207 Points	
2007	125cc	Luke Jones		249 Points	
2008	125cc	Matthew Hoyle	Honda	190 points winning 6 of the 12 Races	
2009	125cc	James Lodge	Honda	182 points winning only 1 race of 12	
2010	125cc	James Lodge	Honda		
2011	125cc	Kyle Ryde	Honda		
2012	125cc	Luke Hedger		185 Points	
2013	125cc	Tom Carne		208 Points	
2014	125cc	Edward Rendell	Honda	208 Points	
2015	125cc	Josh Owens	Honda	208 Points	

=== Moto3 Motostar British champions ===
Year	Class	Rider	Motorcycle	Notes	Ref
2013	250cc	Joe Francis		214 Points	
2014	250cc	Jordan Weaving		225 Points	
2015	250cc	Scott Deroue	KTM	473 Points	
2016	250cc	Charlie Nesbitt	KTM		
2017	250cc	Tom Booth-Amos	KTM		
2018	250cc	Jake Archer	KTM		
2019	250cc	Brandon Paasch	KTM		

=== Moto3 Standard Motostar British champions ===
Year	Class	Rider	Motorcycle	Notes	Ref
2016	250cc	Dan Jones	Honda		
2017	250cc	Max Cook	Honda		
2018	250cc	Víctor Rodríguez	Honda		
2019	250cc	Scott Ogden	Honda		

== KTM British Junior Cup ==
KTM British Junior Cup
- Sport: Motorcycle sport
- No. of teams: 1 manufacturer (KTM)
- Most recent champion: Fenton Seabright
- Website: http://www.ktmrccup.com/

The KTM British Junior Cup was a support race for the British Superbike Championship, open to riders 13-18-years old. Every rider lined up on an identical 'Cup' variation of the KTM RC390. The series gave equal opportunity and level playing field for emerging talent across eight events incorporating 20 points-scoring races. Former MCE BSB rider Steve Plater was the Series ambassador.

In 2015 at the Snetterton Circuit, Thomas Strudwick became the youngest ever rider to win a British Championship Race at 13 years, 247 days beating previous record holder Kyle Ryde.

The 2016 KTM British Junior Cup was won by 15 year old Aaron Wright from Northern Ireland. Wright secured the title with 3 races to spare following 11 wins from 15 completed races and a total of 298 points.

=== KTM British Junior Cup champions ===
Year	Rider	Motorcycle	Notes	Ref
2015	Cameron Fraser	KTM	304 points	
2016	Aaron Wright	KTM	298 points	
2017	Fenton Seabright	KTM	380 points	

== British Junior Supersport Championship ==
British Junior Supersport Championship
- Sport: Motorcycle sport
- No. of teams: 3 manufacturers (Kawasaki, KTM, Yamaha)
- Most recent champion: Finn Smart-Weeden (2023)

=== British Junior Supersport champions ===
Year	Rider	Motorcycle	Ref
2018	Eunan McGlinchey	Kawasaki	
2019	Elliot Pinson	Kawasaki	
2020	Owen Jenner	Kawasaki	
2021	Cameron Dawson	Kawasaki	
2022	James McManus	Kawasaki	
2023	Finn Smart-Weeden	Kawasaki	[66]

== See also ==
- Superbike racing
- Grand Prix motorcycle racing
