= Strudwick =

Strudwick is an English surname. Variants include Strudwicke, Stredwick and Streadwick. Notable people with the surname include:

- David Strudwick (1934–2014), Australian cricketer
- Edmund Strudwick (1802–1879), American physician
- Bert Strudwick (1880–1970), English cricketer
- Jason Strudwick (born 1975), Canadian ice hockey player
- John Melhuish Strudwick (1849–1937), English Pre-Raphaelite painter
- Mark Strudwick (1945–2021), British Army major-general
- Patrick Strudwick (born 1977), British journalist, broadcaster, and activist
- Ross Strudwick (born 1950), Australian rugby league footballer and coach
- Shepperd Strudwick (1907–1983), American actor
- Suzanne Strudwick (born 1965), English golfer
- Thomas Strudwick (born 2001), English motorcycle racer
- Tony Strudwick, English football coach
- Valentine Strudwick (1900–1916), British soldier
- Vincent Strudwick (born 1932), British priest and theologian
- William Francis Strudwick (1770–1810), American politician
- Strudwick (Surrey cricketer), English cricketer
