= Luke Jones (motorcyclist) =

British motorcycle racer

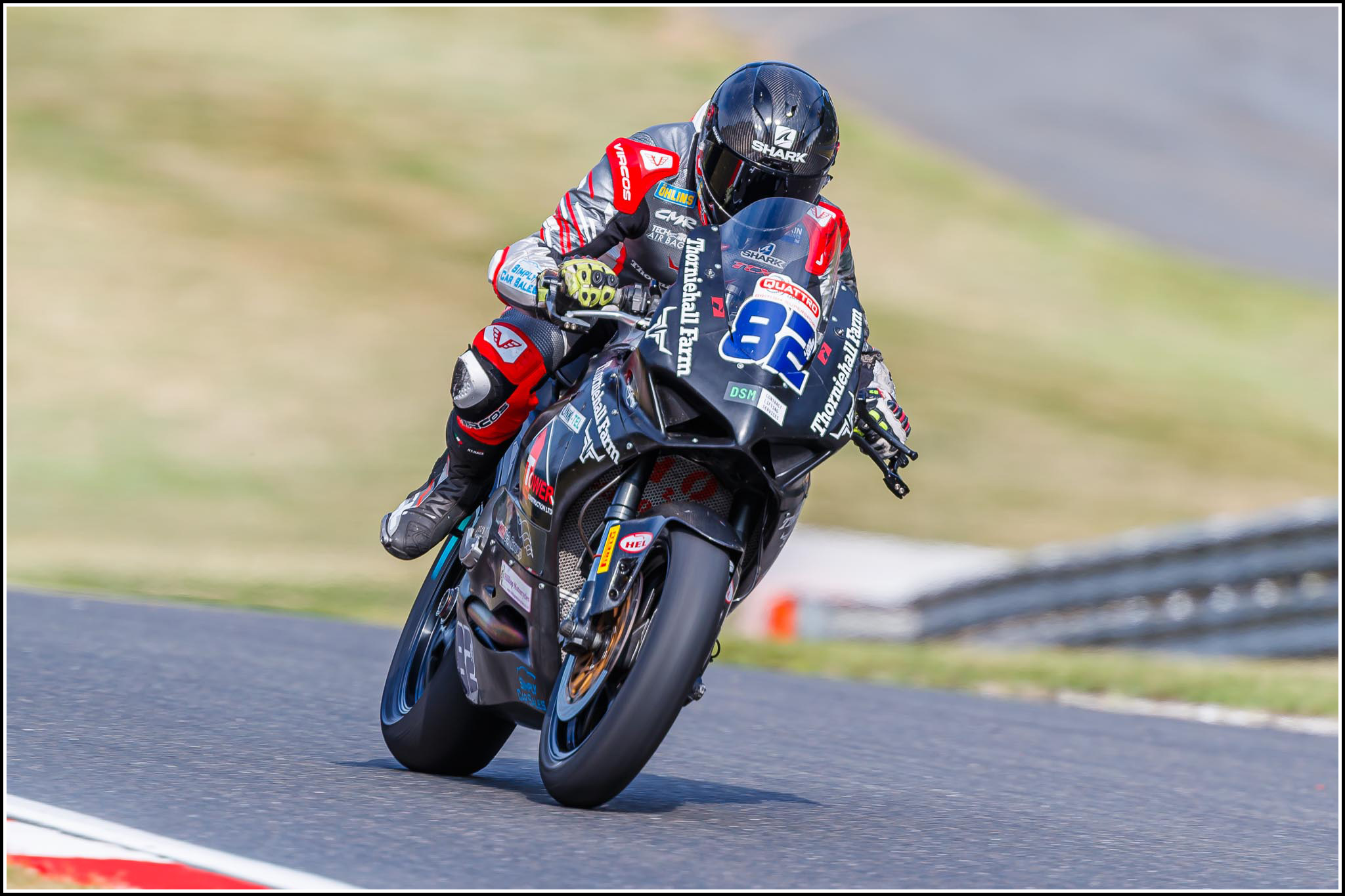
- Jones at Brands Hatch in 2023
- Nationality: British
- Born: 23 September 1988 (age 38); Hereford, England
- Current team: Highsparks Motorsport
- Bike number: 82
Motorcycle racing career statistics
125cc World Championship
Active years	2007
Manufacturers	Honda
Championships	0
2007 championship position	NC (0 pts)
Starts / Wins / Podiums / Poles / F. laps / Points; 1 / 0 / 0 / 0 / 0 / 0

Luke William Jones (born 23 September 1988) is a British Grand Prix motorcycle racer. He races in the British National Superstock 1000 Championship, aboard a Aprilia RSV4.

== Career statistics ==
=== Career highlights ===
- 1999: 2nd, Rissington Karting Championship
- 2000: 1st, Rissington Karting Championship
- 2001: 1st, Junior Production Indoor Championship
- 2002: 2nd, Light Weight Production / 2nd, 910 Cup Welsh Championship
- 2003: 1st, Light Weight production class Welsh Championship / 1st 910 Cup Welsh Championship / 1st Open Class Welsh Championship / 1st Super Light Weight Production Class UK Championship
- 2004: 10th MRO Aprilia Superteen Championship
- 2005: 1st, MRO Aprilia Superteen Championship
- 2006: 7th, BSB GP125 British Championship
- 2007: 1st, BSB GP125 British Championship
- 2011: 1st, Triumph Triple Challenge

=== Grand Prix motorcycle racing ===
==== By season ====
Season	Class	Motorcycle	Team	Number	Race	Win	Podium	Pole	FLap	Pts	Plcd
2007	125cc	Honda	SP125/KDG Racing	82	1	0	0	0	0	0	NC
Total					**1**	**0**	**0**	**0**	**0**	**0**	

=== Races by year ===
Year	Class	Bike	1	2	3	4	5	6	7	8	9	10	11	12	13	14	15	16	17	Pos	Points
2007	125cc	Honda	QAT	SPA	TUR	CHN	FRA	ITA	CAT	GBR; 22	NED	GER	CZE	RSM	POR	JPN	AUS	MAL	VAL	NC	0

=== British Superbike Championship ===
(key) (Races in bold indicate pole position; races in italics indicate fastest lap)

Year	Make	1		2		3		4		5		6		7			8			9		10		11		12			Pos	Pts
Year	Make	R1	R2	R1	R2	R1	R2	R1	R2	R1	R2	R1	R2	R1	R2	R3	R1	R2	R3	R1	R2	R1	R2	R1	R2	R1	R2	R3	Pos	Pts
2010	Yamaha	BHI; 17	BHI; 12	THR; Ret	THR; 21	OUL; DNS	OUL; DNS	CAD	CAD	MAL	MAL	KNO; 16	KNO; C	SNE; 23	SNE; DNS	SNE; DNS	BHGP	BHGP	BHGP	CAD	CAD	CRO	CRO	SIL	SIL	OUL	OUL	OUL	29th	4

=== British Supersport Championship ===
(key) (Races in bold indicate pole position; races in italics indicate fastest lap)

Year	Bike	1	2	3	4	5	6	7	8	9	10	11	12	13	14	15	16	17	18	19	20	21	22	23	24	Pos	Pts
2012	Triumph	BHI; Ret	BHI; 7	THR; 10	THR; 6	OUL; 11	OUL; 13	SNE; 8	SNE; Ret	KNO; 9	KNO; 8	OUL; Ret	OUL; 9	BHGP; 4	BHGP; DNS	CAD	CAD	DON; 8	DON; 8	ASS; 13	ASS; 8	SIL; 8	SIL; 7	BRH; 6	BRH; 3	10th	141.5
2015	MV Agusta	DON; 15	DON; Ret	BRH; 14	BRH; 11	OUL; Ret	OUL; Ret	SNE; Ret	SNE; 9	KNO	KNO	BRH; DNS	BRH; DNS	THR	THR	CAD	CAD	OUL	OUL	ASS	ASS	SIL	SIL	BRH; 18	BRH; Ret	22nd	15
2022	Ducati	SIL; 5	SIL; 5	OUL; 8	OUL; Ret	DON; 10	DON; 10	KNO; 6	KNO; 14	BRH; Ret	BRH; 10	THR; Ret	THR; 9	CAD; 8	CAD; 7	SNE; 6	SNE; 10	OUL; Ret	OUL; Ret	DON; 5	DON; 5	BRH; Ret	BRH; 13			10th	135
2023	Ducati	SLV; Ret	SLV; 9	OPK; 3	OPK; 10	DPK; 6	DPK; 6	KNH; 6	KNH; 8	STN; 5	STN; 5	BRH; Ret	BRH; DNS	TXN; 9	TXN; 7	CPK; 7	CPK; 7	OPK; 5	OPK; 9	DPK; 6	DPK; 12	BRH; Ret	BRH; 2			7th	234

=== Superstock 1000 Cup ===
==== Races by year ====
(key) (Races in bold indicate pole position) (Races in italics indicate fastest lap)

Year	Bike	1	2	3	4	5	6	7	8	Pos	Pts
2016	Kawasaki	ARA	NED	IMO	DON; 10	MIS; 25	LAU	MAG	JER	26th	6
