= Tom Booth-Amos =

British motorcycle racer

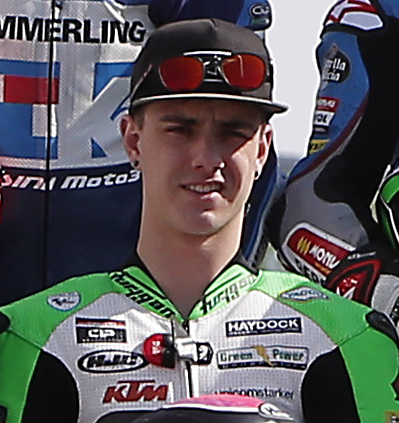
- Booth-Amos in 2019
- Nationality: British
- Born: 12 March 1996 (age 30); Newport, Shropshire, Great Britain
- Current team: PTR Triumph Factory Racing
- Bike number: 69
Motorcycle racing career statistics
Moto3 World Championship
Active years	2017, 2019
Manufacturers	KTM
Championships	0
2019 championship position	28th (10 pts)
Starts / Wins / Podiums / Poles / F. laps / Points; 20 / 0 / 0 / 0 / 0 / 10
Supersport World Championship
Active years	2022–
Manufacturers	Kawasaki, Triumph
Championships	0
2025 championship position	4th (262 pts)
Starts / Wins / Podiums / Poles / F. laps / Points; 104 / 3 / 15 / 0 / 6 / 632
Supersport 300 World Championship
Active years	2020–2021
Manufacturers	Kawasaki
Championships	0
2021 championship position	2nd (189 pts)
Starts / Wins / Podiums / Poles / F. laps / Points; 27 / 3 / 13 / 2 / 2 / 300

Thomas Booth-Amos (born 12 March 2000) is an English motorcycle racer competing in the 2026 Supersport World Championship for PTR Triumph Factory Racing.

== Career ==
During 2017 Booth-Amos competed in the British Motostar Moto3 Championship, winning the title on a KTM.

Booth-Amos competed full-time in the FIM CEV Moto3 Junior World Championship in 2018.

As a member of the British Talent Team, Booth-Amos graduated into Grand Prix racing the following season with support of the series' commercial rights holder Dorna.

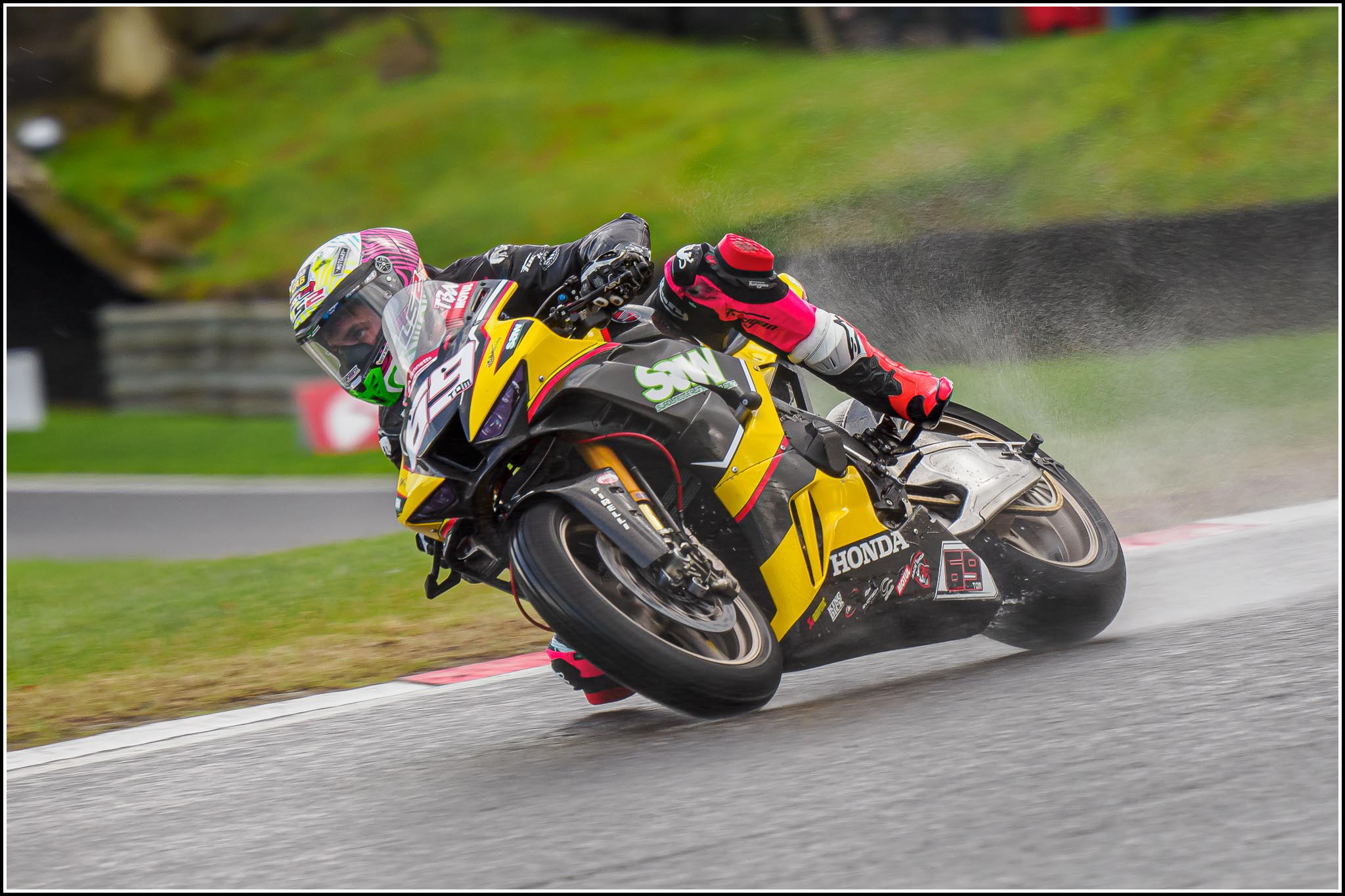
Booth-Amos at Brands Hatch during the 2023 British Superbike Championship

Booth-Amos raced in the World Supersport 300 Championship in 2020 and 2021 with a successful second season finishing second in the championship.

For 2022, Booth-Amos graduated to the World Supersport Championship.

During 2023, he split his racing, riding in both the Supersport World Championship for Motozoo Kawasaki Racing by Puccetti, finishing in 15th place and winning the WorldSSP Challenge, and in the British Supersport Championship for Gearlink Kawasaki, finishing in second place.

For 2024, Booth-Amos would continue in the Supersport World Championship, switching manufacturers and teams to PTR Triumph.

== Career statistics ==
=== FIM CEV Moto3 Junior World Championship ===
==== Races by year ====
(key) (Races in bold indicate pole position, races in italics indicate fastest lap)

Year	Bike	1	2	3	4	5	6	7	8	9	10	11	12	Pos	Pts
2017	Honda	ALB	LMS	CAT1	CAT2	VAL1	VAL2	EST	JER1	JER1	ARA	VAL1; 29	VAL2; 16	NC	0
2018	Honda	EST; Ret	VAL1; DNS	VAL2; DNS	FRA; 40	CAT1	CAT2	ARA; 26	JER1; 14	JER2; Ret	ALB; 5	VAL1; Ret	VAL2; Ret	22nd	13

=== Grand Prix motorcycle racing ===
==== By season ====
Season	Class	Motorcycle	Team	Race	Win	Podium	Pole	FLap	Pts	Plcd
2017	Moto3	KTM	City Lifting RS Racing	1	0	0	0	0	0	37th
2019	Moto3	KTM	CIP Green Power	19	0	0	0	0	10	28th
Total				**20**	**0**	**0**	**0**	**0**	**10**	

==== Races by year ====
(key) (Races in bold indicate pole position; races in italics indicate fastest lap)

Year	Class	Bike	1	2	3	4	5	6	7	8	9	10	11	12	13	14	15	16	17	18	19	Pos	Pts
2017	Moto3	KTM	QAT	ARG	AME	SPA	FRA	ITA	CAT	NED	GER	CZE	AUT	GBR; 21	RSM	ARA	JPN	AUS	MAL	VAL		37th	0
2019	Moto3	KTM	QAT; 24	ARG; 18	AME; Ret	SPA; Ret	FRA; 17	ITA; Ret	CAT; 14	NED; 23	GER; 24	CZE; Ret	AUT; 25	GBR; 25	RSM; Ret	ARA; 27	THA; Ret	JPN; 24	AUS; 8	MAL; 21	VAL; 18	28th	10

=== Supersport 300 World Championship ===
==== Races by year ====
(key)

Year	Bike	1	2	3	4	5	6	7	8	9	10	11	12	13	14	15	16	Pos	Pts	Ref
2020	Kawasaki	SPA; 2	SPA; 3	POR; 3	POR; Ret	SPA; 5	SPA; Ret	SPA; Ret	SPA; 9	SPA; 1	SPA; Ret	FRA; Ret	FRA; 26	POR; 3	POR; Ret			6th	111	
2021	Kawasaki	SPA; 2	SPA; 1	ITA; 2	ITA; 17	NED; Ret	NED; 1	CZE; 8	CZE; 2	FRA; 2	FRA; 2	SPA; Ret	SPA; DNS	SPA; DNS	SPA; DNS	POR; 2	POR; 2	2nd	189	

=== Supersport World Championship ===
==== Races by year ====
(key) (Races in bold indicate pole position; races in italics indicate fastest lap)

Year	Bike	1		2		3		4		5		6		7		8		9		10		11		12		Pos	Pts
Year	Bike	R1	R2	R1	R2	R1	R2	R1	R2	R1	R2	R1	R2	R1	R2	R1	R2	R1	R2	R1	R2	R1	R2	R1	R2	Pos	Pts
2022	Kawasaki	SPA; 13	SPA; 15	NED; Ret	NED; DNS	POR; DNS	POR; DNS	ITA; Ret	ITA; DNS	GBR; 16	GBR; 17	CZE; 15	CZE; 17	FRA; 20	FRA; 17	SPA; 19	SPA; 24	POR; Ret	POR; Ret	ARG; 13	ARG; 13	INA; 11	INA; 11	AUS; 8	AUS; 18	23rd	29
2023	Kawasaki	AUS	AUS	INA	INA	NED; 15	NED; 10	SPA; 13	SPA; 14	ITA; Ret	ITA; 12	GBR; 9	GBR; 6	ITA; 8	ITA; Ret	CZE; 13	CZE; 13	FRA; 13	FRA; Ret	SPA; Ret	SPA; 11	POR; 15	POR; Ret	SPA	SPA	15th	56
2024	Triumph	AUS; Ret	AUS; 13	SPA; 13	SPA; 15	NED; Ret	NED; 16	ITA; Ret	ITA; 10	GBR; 7	GBR; 5	CZE; 8	CZE; DNS	POR; 23	POR; 10	FRA; 9	FRA; 4	ITA; 5	ITA; 3	SPA; Ret	SPA; 6	POR; 15	POR; Ret	SPA; 6	SPA; 11	10th	120
2025	Triumph	PHI; 2	PHI; 1	POR; 5	POR; 3	ASS; 5	ASS; 15	CRE; 2	CRE; 2	MOS; Ret	MOS; 9	MIS; 5	MIS; Ret	DON; 2	DON; 2	BAL; Ret	BAL; 10	MAG; 6	MAG; 3	ARA; 16	ARA; 7	EST; 23	EST; 6	JER; 7	JER; 2	4th	262
2026	Triumph	AUS; Ret	AUS; 15	POR; 12	POR; 12	NED; 3	NED; 4	HUN; 7	HUN; 6	CZE; 26	CZE; 16	ARA; 3	ARA; 7	EMI; 4	EMI; 2	GBR; 1	GBR; 1	FRA; 25	FRA; Ret	ITA; 5	ITA; 3	EST; 1	EST; Ret	SPA; 4	SPA; Ret	5th	230

=== British Supersport Championship ===
(key) (Races in bold indicate pole position; races in italics indicate fastest lap)

Year	Bike	1	2	3	4	5	6	7	8	9	10	11	12	13	14	15	16	17	18	19	20	21	22	Pos	Pts
2022	Kawasaki	SIL	SIL	OUL	OUL	DON	DON	KNO	KNO	BRH	BRH	THR	THR	CAD	CAD	SNE	SNE	OUL	OUL	**DON**; 4	DON; 4	BRH; 8	BRH; 5	16th	45
2023	Kawasaki	SLV; 3	SLV; Ret	OPK; 1	OPK; 4	DPK; Ret	DPK; 1	KNH; 1	KNH; Ret	STN; 1	STN; 3	BRH; Ret	BRH; 3	TXN; 25	TXN; 3	CPK; 3	CPK; Ret	OPK; 1	OPK; 1	DPK	DPK	BRH; 2	BRH; 1	2nd	333
2024	Triumph	SPA	SPA	OPK	OPK	DPK; 2	DPK; 1	KNH	KNH	STN	STN	BRH	BRH	TXN	TXN	CPK	CPK	OPK	OPK	DPK	DPK	BRH	BRH	10th	47

=== British Superbike Championship ===
Year	Bike	1			2			3			4			5			6			7			8			9			10			11			Pos	Pts
Year	Bike	R1	R2	R3	R1	R2	R3	R1	R2	R3	R1	R2	R3	R1	R2	R3	R1	R2	R3	R1	R2	R3	R1	R2	R3	R1	R2	R3	R1	R2	R3	R1	R2	R3	Pos	Pts
2023	Honda	SIL	SIL	SIL	OUL	OUL	OUL	DON	DON	DON	KNO	KNO	KNO	SNE	SNE	SNE	BRH	BRH	BRH	THR	THR	THR	CAD	CAD	CAD	OUL	OUL	OUL	DON	DON	DON	BRH; 20	BRH; Ret	BRH; 22	NC	0
