= Margerison =

Margerison is an English surname.

Margerison is a corruption of the surnames Margesson and Margetson, and is a matronymic from the medieval female given name "Margerie", itself coming from the late Latin "Margarita", meaning "Pearl" (borrowed from the Greek "Margaretes", a pearl, but ultimately from a Persian word meaning "child of light"). The matronymic forms of the name first appear in Yorkshire (see below), and one Robert Majorison was recorded in the 1379 Poll Tax Returns Records of that county. The name is still most widespread in Yorkshire. The first recorded spelling of the family name is shown to be that of Roger Margeryson, which was dated 1379, in the "Poll Tax Returns Records of Yorkshire", during the reign of King Richard II, known as "Richard of Bordeaux", 1377 - 1399. At present, the most popular corruptions: Margerison, Margesson and Margetson are relatively rare surnames, each having 1063, 125 and 892 worldwide surname holders, respectively.

Notable Margerisons:

- Lee Margerison (born 1973), English footballer
- James Margetson (1600–1678), Archbishop of Armagh
- Tom Margerison (1923–2014), British science journalist, writer and broadcaster
