= 2015 KTM British Junior Cup =

The 2015 KTM British Junior Cup was the first KTM British Junior Cup season. The KTM British Junior Cup Championship is a support category for the British Superbike Championship.

== Calendar ==
2015 Calendar
Round	Circuit	Date	Pole position	Fastest lap	Winning rider
1	(England) Donington Park	6 April	(Germany) Dennis Stelzer	(England) James Nagy	(Germany) Dennis Stelzer
2	(England) Brands Hatch Indy	19 April	(England) Cameron Fraser	(England) Cameron Fraser	(England) Cameron Fraser
3	(England) Snetterton 300	21 June	(England) Cameron Fraser	(England) Thomas Strudwick	(England) Thomas Strudwick
4	(Scotland) Knockhill	5 July	(England) Thomas Strudwick	(Republic of Ireland) Kevin Keyes	(England) Thomas Strudwick
5	(England) Thruxton	2 August	(Republic of Ireland) Kevin Keyes	(England) Cameron Fraser	(England) Cameron Fraser
6	(England) Cadwell Park	23 August	(England) Chris Taylor	(England) Chris Taylor	(England) Chris Taylor
7	(England) Oulton Park	6 September	(England) Cameron Fraser	(England) Cameron Fraser	(England) Cameron Fraser
8	(England) Silverstone Arena GP	4 October	(Finland) Patrik Pulkkinen	(England) Cameron Fraser	(Netherlands) Dijm Ulrich

== Championship standings ==
=== Riders' Championship ===
Pos	Rider	Bike	DON	BRH	SNE	KNO	CAD	OUL	SIL	Pts
1	C. Fraser	KTM								304
2	C. Taylor	KTM								271
3	K.Keyes	KTM								261
4	T.Strudwick	KTM								194
5	J.Nagy	KTM								184
6	L.Hindle	KTM								155
7	R.Guyett	KTM								146
8	A.Wright	KTM								145
9	D. Drayton	KTM								125
10	O. O'Flaherty	KTM								102

Colour	Result
Gold	Winner
Silver	Second place
Bronze	Third place
Green	Points classification
Blue	Non-points classification
Blue	Non-classified finish (NC)
Purple	Retired, not classified (Ret)
Red	Did not qualify (DNQ)
Red	Did not pre-qualify (DNPQ)
Black	Disqualified (DSQ)
White	Did not start (DNS)
White	Withdrew (WD)
White	Race cancelled (C)
Blank	Did not practice (DNP)
Blank	Did not arrive (DNA)
Blank	Excluded (EX)
