= Lee Margerison =

English footballer

Personal information
- Date of birth: 10 September 1973 (age 53)
- Place of birth: Bradford, England
- Position: Midfielder

Youth career
- 19xx–1992: Bradford City

Senior career*
Years	Team	Apps	(Gls)
1992–1993	Bradford City	3	(0)
1993	Slough Town	4	(0)
- Gainsborough Trinity
- Bradford (Park Avenue)
- Eccleshill United
Total		7+	(0+)
- * Club domestic league appearances and goals

Lee Margerison (born 10 September 1973) is an English former professional footballer who played as a midfielder.

== Career ==
Born in Bradford, Margerison made three appearances in the Football League for Bradford City, and later played non-league football for Slough Town, Gainsborough Trinity and Bradford (Park Avenue). He also played for Eccleshill United.

== After football ==
In May 2010, Margerison was one of seven former football professionals who undertook a 140-mile charity bike ride, in memory of a university friend who died of leukaemia. The other riders included Tony Strudwick, Chris Jones, Tom Curtis, Liam Kane, Joe Whibley and Chris Kerr.

Margerison now works as a teacher at St Aidan's Church of England High School in Harrogate.
