= 2023 British Supersport Championship =

Motorcycle racing series

The 2023 British Supersport Championship season was the 35th British Supersport Championship season, incorporating the 2023 British GP2 Cup. Jack Kennedy was the reigning series champion, but did not return to defend his title as he moved up to the 2023 British Superbike Championship. The season was marred by the sudden death of rider Damon Rees following a short illness.

== Teams and riders ==
2023 Entry List
Team	Constructor	No.	Rider	Class	Rounds
R&R Racing	Yamaha	2	(England) T.J. Toms		All
R&R Racing	Yamaha	4	(Republic of Ireland) Caolán Irwin		1–3
R&R Racing	Yamaha	64	(Scotland) Sam Munro		5
Truelove Brothers	Triumph/Suzuki	3	(England) Harry Truelove		3, 8
Milenco by Padgetts Motorcycles Honda	Honda	4	(England) Davey Todd		6
BPE Yamaha	Yamaha	4	(England) Dean Harrison		9–11
BPE Yamaha	Yamaha	47	(England) Richard Cooper		9, 11
Tech 5 Racing	Ducati	5	(England) Matt Stevens	SSC	2–3, 5–7, 10–11
PWR	Yamaha	6	(England) Phil Wakefield		1–4
Macadam Racing	Yamaha	7	(Australia) Tom Toparis		All
Macadam Racing	Yamaha	41	(England) Jack Nixon		1
Profile / Road and Racing Performance	Kawasaki	8	(England) Luke Stapleford		1–8, 10
Hawk/MD Racing	Yamaha	9	(Northern Ireland) Michael Dunlop		2
Krämer Racing	Krämer	10	(England) Joe Collier	GP2	1–8
Krämer Racing	Krämer	10	(England) Barry Burrell	GP2	10–11
Team FR89	Kalex	11	(England) Lucca Allen	GP2	1, 3–11
ASTRO-JJR Suzuki	Suzuki	12	(England) Jamie Perrin		All
ASTRO-JJR Suzuki	Suzuki	69	(Republic of Ireland) Rhys Irwin		All
Ashcourt Racing	Yamaha	13	(Northern Ireland) Lee Johnston		1–2
Completely Motorbikes Triumph	Triumph	14	(Northern Ireland) James McManus		All
Completely Motorbikes Triumph	Triumph	15	(Northern Ireland) Eugene McManus		All
Go Racing/SGR	Chassis Factory	16	(England) Harvey Claridge	GP2	3, 5–11
Go Racing/SGR	Chassis Factory	73	(Wales) Harry Rowlings	GP2	1–11
Right Gear Racing	Yamaha	17	(England) Gareth Cunningham	SSC	2–3, 6
Go Pink Racing	Ariane	18	(England) Jodie Fieldhouse	GP2	1, 5–8
Merlin Motorsport	Kawasaki	19	(England) Ben Grayson	SSC	All (Note: Grayson competed in the Supersport Cup in rounds 2-3 and 6-11. He competed as a regular entrant in rounds 1, 4 and 5.)
Motorcycle Race Parts Ducati	Ducati	21	(England) Tom Tunstall	SSC	2–3, 5–7, 9–11
Team Val-Tech Racing	Kawasaki	22	(Northern Ireland) Eunan McGlinchey		All
Jones Brothers Racing	Kawasaki	23	(Wales) Osian Jones		9–10
Tommo#21 Racing	Triumph	24	(England) Stephen Thomas		7
Exersci Yamaha	Yamaha	26	(England) Tommy Fielding		10
Ready4Racing Vision Team	Ducati	27	(South Africa) Blaze Baker		1–2
DANIK Group Motorsport	Triumph	29	(England) Dan Burnham		1, 7, 10
Nykos Racing	Nykos	30	(England) Owen Mellor	GP2	8–9, 11
Team Tolly Racing	Yamaha	33	(England) Ben Tolliday	SSC	2–4, 6, 8–11
JW Racing	Yamaha	35	(England) Josh Wood	SSC	1, 3, 5–6, 8–11
KTS Racing	Yamaha	36	(England) Jamie Coward		11
James Bull Racing	Yamaha	37	(England) James Bull	SSC	1–3, 5–7
JDF Racing	Ducati	38	(Scotland) Adon Davie	SSC	1–4, 6–7, 9, 11
PHR Performance Triumph	Triumph	41	(England) Jack Nixon		7–11
PHR Performance Triumph	Triumph	47	(England) Richard Cooper		8
True Heroes Racing/Laguna Motorcycles Ducati	Ducati	44	(England) Charlie White		1–3, 5–11
True Heroes Racing/Laguna Motorcycles Ducati	Ducati	50	(England) Dave Mackay		2–3, 5–6
True Heroes Racing/Laguna Motorcycles Ducati	Ducati	50	(England) Leon Wilton		1, 7–11
RD Racing	Triumph	45	(England) Jake Marsh	GP2	1–6, 8–11
BarneyRacing	Yamaha	46	(England) Ash Barnes		1–9
Russell Racing	Yamaha	47	(England) Richard Cooper		2, 6
Elmech Racing Team	Triumph	49	(England) Luke Wallington	GP2	1–3, 5–11
EG Racing	Yamaha	51	(England) Ryan Garside	SSC	1–10 (Note: Garside competed in the Supersport Cup in rounds 1-8. He competed as a regular entrant in rounds 9 and 10.)
Gearlink Kawasaki	Kawasaki	54	(England) Tim Neave		10
Gearlink Kawasaki	Kawasaki	55	(England) Zak Corderoy		All
Gearlink Kawasaki	Kawasaki	96	(England) Tom Booth-Amos		1–9, 11
JMCC Roofing Racing	Yamaha	56	(Northern Ireland) Adam McLean		2, 4
Seeeeeth Yamaha	Yamaha	57	(Australia) Seth Crump		All
CM Racing / Team Xclusiv	Kawasaki	59	(England) Caiden Wilkinson	SSC	3, 6, 8, 10
Oxford Products Racing Ducati	Ducati	61	(Australia) Ben Currie		All
Go Racing Developments CFR	Chassis Factory	66	(England) Cameron Fraser	GP2	All
LAMI OMG Racing Yamaha	Yamaha	67	(Republic of Ireland) Casey O'Gorman		8, 10–11
CF Motorsport	Yamaha	68	(England) Carter Brown		7
Lee	Yamaha	70	(England) Lee Wells		8
Peterpan Racing	Yamaha	71	(England) Dave Grace	SSC	2–3, 6–11
Macadam Racing with Specialised Group Racing	Yamaha	72	(England) Max Wadsworth		1–3, 8–11
MPM Routz Racing	Yamaha	74	(Netherlands) Jaimie van Sikkelerus		All
Lee Devonport Racing	Yamaha	75	(England) Lee Devonport	SSC	1–2, 9–11
PreZ Racing Yamaha	Yamaha	76	(Northern Ireland) Paul Jordan		1–2
JRM Ducati	Ducati	77	(England) Jonathan Railton	SSC	1, 3–7, 10–11
Talentum Motorsport By Azure Notions	Yamaha	78	(England) Freddie Barnes		1–7, 9–11
Highsparks Ducati	Ducati	82	(England) Luke Jones		All
Swan Racing	Yamaha	87	(England) Jake Hopper		10–11
Aalco Motorsport	Kawasaki	88	(England) Harry Leigh	SSC	1–3, 5–6, 10
NRG-MOTO.COM	Yamaha	89	(Northern Ireland) Mark Conlin	SSC	1, 3
Resideo Racing	Ducati	90	(England) Craig Kennelly	SSC	1–3, 5–7, 9, 11
K2 Trooper Triumph by PHR Performance	Triumph	91	(France) Pierre-Yves Bian		1–2
Carl Cox Motorsport with Uggly & Co by Binch Pro	Yamaha	92	(New Zealand) Damon Rees^{†}		1–4
Carl Cox Motorsport with Uggly & Co by Binch Pro	Yamaha	64	(Scotland) Sam Munro		6–7, 10–11
Carl Cox Motorsport with Uggly & Co by Binch Pro	Yamaha	25	(England) Thomas Strudwick		8–9
Dan Cooper Motorsport	Yamaha	94	(England) George Edwards		3
Force One Racing team	MV Agusta	99	(England) Harry Cook	SSC	1, 3, 5–7, 9–11

Key
Regular Rider
Wildcard Rider
Replacement rider
GP2 GP2 Cup
SSC Supersport Cup

== Race calendar and results ==
2023 calendar
Round		Circuit	Date	Pole position	Fastest lap	Winning rider	Winning team
1	SR	(England) Silverstone National	8 April	(Northern Ireland) Lee Johnston	(England) Tom Booth-Amos	(Northern Ireland) Lee Johnston	Ashcourt Racing
1	FR	(England) Silverstone National	9 April	(England) Tom Booth-Amos	(Australia) Tom Toparis	(Northern Ireland) Lee Johnston	Ashcourt Racing
2	SR	(England) Oulton Park	30 April	(England) Richard Cooper	(England) Richard Cooper	(England) Tom Booth-Amos	Gearlink Kawasaki
2	FR	(England) Oulton Park	1 May	(England) Richard Cooper	(England) Richard Cooper	(England) Luke Stapleford	Profile / Road and Racing Performance
3	SR	(England) Donington Park GP	20 May	(England) Tom Booth-Amos	(England) Tom Booth-Amos	(Netherlands) Jaimie van Sikkelerus	MPM Routz Racing
3	FR	(England) Donington Park GP	21 May	(England) Tom Booth-Amos	(England) Tom Booth-Amos	(England) Tom Booth-Amos	Gearlink Kawasaki
4	SR	(Scotland) Knockhill	17 June	(England) Tom Booth-Amos	(England) Tom Booth-Amos	(England) Tom Booth-Amos	Gearlink Kawasaki
4	FR	(Scotland) Knockhill	18 June	(England) Tom Booth-Amos	(England) Tom Booth-Amos	(Republic of Ireland) Rhys Irwin	ASTRO-JJR Suzuki
5	SR	(England) Snetterton 300	8 July	(England) Luke Stapleford	(England) Tom Booth-Amos	(England) Tom Booth-Amos	Gearlink Kawasaki
5	FR	(England) Snetterton 300	9 July	(England) Tom Booth-Amos	(Australia) Ben Currie	(England) Luke Stapleford	Profile / Road and Racing Performance
6	SR	(England) Brands Hatch GP	22 July	(England) Luke Stapleford	(England) Richard Cooper	(England) Richard Cooper	Russell Racing
6	FR	(England) Brands Hatch GP	23 July	(England) Richard Cooper	(England) Tom Booth-Amos	(Republic of Ireland) Rhys Irwin	ASTRO-JJR Suzuki
7	SR	(England) Thruxton	12 August	(England) T.J. Toms	(England) Tom Booth-Amos	(Australia) Ben Currie	Oxford Products Racing Ducati
7	FR	(England) Thruxton	13 August	(England) Tom Booth-Amos	(Republic of Ireland) Rhys Irwin	(Australia) Ben Currie	Oxford Products Racing Ducati
8	SR	(England) Cadwell Park	27 August	(Australia) Ben Currie	(England) Tom Booth-Amos	(Australia) Ben Currie	Oxford Products Racing Ducati
8	FR	(England) Cadwell Park	28 August	(England) Tom Booth-Amos	(England) Tom Booth-Amos	(Australia) Ben Currie	Oxford Products Racing Ducati
9	SR	(England) Oulton Park	16 September	(Australia) Ben Currie	(Netherlands) Jaimie van Sikkelerus	(England) Tom Booth-Amos	Gearlink Kawasaki
9	FR	(England) Oulton Park	17 September	(Netherlands) Jaimie van Sikkelerus	(England) Dean Harrison	(England) Tom Booth-Amos	Gearlink Kawasaki
10	SR	(England) Donington Park National	30 September	(Australia) Ben Currie	(Australia) Ben Currie	(Australia) Ben Currie	Oxford Products Racing Ducati
10	FR	(England) Donington Park National	1 October	(Australia) Ben Currie	(Australia) Ben Currie	(Australia) Ben Currie	Oxford Products Racing Ducati
11	SR	(England) Brands Hatch GP	14 October	(Republic of Ireland) Rhys Irwin	(Australia) Ben Currie	(England) Richard Cooper	BPE Yamaha
11	FR	(England) Brands Hatch GP	15 October	(Australia) Ben Currie	(Australia) Ben Currie	(England) Tom Booth-Amos	Gearlink Kawasaki

== Championship standings ==
Scoring system in the Main season

Points are awarded to the top fifteen finishers in the respective classes. A rider has to finish the race to earn points.

Position	**1st**	**2nd**	**3rd**	**4th**	**5th**	**6th**	**7th**	**8th**	**9th**	**10th**	**11th**	**12th**	**13th**	**14th**	**15th**
Points	25	22	20	18	16	14	12	10	8	6	5	4	3	2	1

Scoring system in the season finale

Points are awarded to the top fifteen finishers in the respective classes. A rider has to finish the race to earn points.

Position	**1st**	**2nd**	**3rd**	**4th**	**5th**	**6th**	**7th**	**8th**	**9th**	**10th**	**11th**	**12th**	**13th**	**14th**	**15th**
Points	35	30	27	24	22	20	18	16	14	12	10	8	6	4	2

Supersport Championship

Pos	Rider	Bike	SIL (England)		OUL (England)		DON (England)		KNO (Scotland)		SNE (England)		BRH (England)		THR (England)		CAD (England)		OUL (England)		DON (England)		BRH (England)		Pts
Pos	Rider	Bike	SR	FR	SR	FR	SR	FR	SR	FR	SR	FR	SR	FR	SR	FR	SR	FR	SR	FR	SR	FR	SR	FR	Pts
1	(Australia) Ben Currie	Ducati	6	6	6	3	Ret	2	4	3	3	9	2	2	1	1	**1**	1	**2**	3	**1**	**1**	6	**Ret**	406
2	(England) Tom Booth-Amos	Kawasaki	3	**Ret**	1	4	**Ret**	**1**	**1**	**Ret**	1	**3**	DNS	3	25	**3**	3	**Ret**	1	1			2	1	333
3	(Australia) Tom Toparis	Yamaha	4	3	14	Ret	2	5	7	4	Ret	4	9	6	7	4	4	4	4	8	7	8	3	Ret	288
4	(Republic of Ireland) Rhys Irwin	Suzuki	Ret	2	5	5	DNS	14	3	1	2	2	5	1	3	2	Ret	3	Ret	Ret	8	Ret	**5**	Ret	282
5	(England) Luke Stapleford	Kawasaki	2	Ret	Ret	1	3	3	2	2	**Ret**	1	**8**	Ret	2	4	2	Ret			DNS	2			246
6	(Netherlands) Jaimie van Sikkelerus	Yamaha	Ret	5	10	7	1	4	10	7	4	Ret	11	9	8	10	Ret	10	3	**7**	10	5	4	12	248
7	(England) Luke Jones	Ducati	Ret	9	3	10	6	6	6	8	5	5	Ret	DNS	9	7	7	7	5	9	6	12	Ret	2	234
8	(England) T.J. Toms	Yamaha	9	16	7	Ret	9	13	6	10	Ret	10	7	Ret	**4**	5	6	5	7	6	2	7	10	4	227
9	(Northern Ireland) Eugene McManus	Triumph	Ret	8	12	Ret	Ret	7	11	5	7	7	5	10	11	8	8	6	Ret	7	4	4	Ret	3	203
10	(England) Jamie Perrin	Suzuki	5	4	Ret	11	4	Ret	5	6	6	6	8	5	DSQ	Ret	9	11	Ret	Ret	14	6	12	Ret	183
11	(England) Richard Cooper	Yamaha			**2**	**2**							1	**4**					Ret	2			1	Ret	182
11	(England) Richard Cooper	Triumph															5	2							182
12	(Northern Ireland) Eunan McGlinchey	Kawasaki	Ret	18	4	8	Ret	11	Ret	DNS	8	Ret	Ret	8	5	Ret	Ret	DNS	Ret	DSQ	3	10	Ret	6	116
13	(England) Zak Corderoy	Kawasaki	13	11	8	Ret	7	9	Ret	9	Ret	Ret	3	7	7	Ret	Ret	Ret	Ret	Ret	Ret	Ret	7	Ret	111
14	(England) Jack Nixon	Yamaha	8	12											12	12	12	10	8	5	13	11	9	5	108
15	(England) Dean Harrison	Yamaha																	6	4	12	9	19	7	65
16	(England) Max Wadsworth	Yamaha	11	10	15	17	11	DNS									15	9	9	14	11	21	15	14	65
17	(Northern Ireland) Lee Johnston	Yamaha	**1**	1	Ret	10																			64
18	(Australia) Seth Crump	Yamaha	14	13	30	15	5	Ret	12	14	Ret	Ret	Ret	18	23	21	Ret	Ret	12	13	Ret	16	18	11	60
19	(New Zealand) Damon Rees^{†}	Yamaha	7	Ret	20	9	9	8	8	10															54
20	(Scotland) Sam Munro	Yamaha									11	13	6	11	DNS	DNS					Ret	13	DNS	10	49
21	(Republic of Ireland) Casey O'Gorman	Yamaha															WD	WD			5	3	5	Ret	46
22	(England) Ash Barnes	Yamaha	Ret	Ret	Ret	Ret	Ret	14	16	17	9	8	19	14	Ret	17	14	Ret	WD	WD					35
23	(Northern Ireland) James McManus	Triumph	17	14	Ret	Ret	13	16	12	Ret	13	16	Ret	19	17	16	Ret	15	Ret	Ret	18	17	Ret	15	35
24	(England) Jonathan Railton	Ducati	DNS	DNS			22	Ret	18	20	17	15	22	15	15	14					23	22	24	16	24
25	(South Africa) Blaze Baker	Ducati	10	7																					18
26	(England) Tom Tunstall	Ducati			19	19	16	18			15	17	21	17	20	19			13	18	19	23	22	20	16
27	(Scotland) Adon Davie	Ducati	23	21	WD	WD	19	Ret	13	12			18	Ret	18	15			Ret	17			25	19	16
28	(England) Thomas Strudwick	Yamaha															13	12	Ret	11					13
29	(Northern Ireland) Michael Dunlop	Yamaha			11	13																			10
30	(England) Carter Brown	Yamaha													16	11									9
31	(England) Josh Wood	Yamaha	19	23			WD	WD			Ret	18	WD	WD			18	19	15	20	Ret	25	Ret	17	9
32	(Northern Ireland) Adam McLean	Yamaha			13	14			Ret	15															9
33	(England) Jamie Coward	Yamaha																					17	18	8
34	(England) Harry Truelove	Triumph					20	12																	7
34	(England) Harry Truelove	Suzuki															16	DNS							7
35	(England) Phil Wakefield	Yamaha	24	22	16	16	15	20	17	DNS															6
36	(England) Ryan Garside	Yamaha	25	24	Ret	20	26	22	22	22	Ret	24	24	24	24	22	22	22	17	21	16	24			5
37	(England) Dave Grace	Yamaha			22	Ret	24	27					13	Ret	27	24	Ret	25	20	24	22	26	23	24	4
38	(England) Harry Leigh	Kawasaki	18	19	23	26	17	21			20	Ret	30	21							Ret	29			4
39	(England) Ben Tolliday	Yamaha			24	24	Ret	23	21	21			23	23			17	16	19	26	27	31	DNS	DNS	4
40	(England) Dave Mackay	Ducati			18	25	25	28			21	21	15	Ret											3
41	(England) James Bull	Yamaha	20	20	26	21	18	Ret			18	20	Ret	20	22	Ret									3
42	(England) Tim Neave	Kawasaki																			DNS	14			2
43	(England) Ben Grayson	Kawasaki	DNS	Ret	31	Ret	DNS	DNS	23	23	WD	WD	29	28	30	Ret	Ret	26	18	27	31	34	Ret	28	2
44	(England) Davey Todd	Honda											Ret	16											2
45	(England) Tommy Fielding	Yamaha																			17	27			1
46	(England) Caiden Wilkinson	Kawasaki					DNS	DNS					27	27			21	18			28	32			1
	(England) Lee Wells	Yamaha															20	20							0
	(England) Freddie Barnes	Yamaha	30	29	28	Ret	29	29	Ret	Ret	23	23	Ret	25	Ret	Ret			21	22	Ret	DNS	20	22	0
	(France) Pierre Yves-Bian	Triumph	21	Ret	27	DNS																			0
	(England) George Edwards	Yamaha					21	Ret																	0
	(Northern Ireland) Paul Jordan	Yamaha	26	Ret	DNS	23																			0
	(Wales) Osian Jones	Kawasaki																	Ret	23	WD	WD			0
	(England) Matt Stevens	Ducati			32	29	DNS	Ret			25	Ret	DNS	30	29	27					DNS	35	Ret	DNS	0
	(England) Leon Wilton	Ducati	Ret	DNS											33	30	28	27	26	Ret	32	DNS	DNS	DNS	0
	(England) Dan Burnham	Triumph	27	27											32	28					DNS	DNS			0
	(England) Gareth Cunningham	Yamaha			DNS	28	DNS	DNS					WD	WD											0
	(England) Jake Hopper	Yamaha																			Ret	Ret	WD	WD	0
	(England) Stephen Thomas	Triumph													Ret	DNS									0
	(Northern Ireland) Mark Conlin	Yamaha	DNS	DNS			DNS	DNS																	0
Pos	Rider	Bike	SIL (England)		OUL (England)		DON (England)		KNO (Scotland)		SNE (England)		BRH (England)		THR (England)		CAD (England)		OUL (England)		DON (England)		BRH (England)		Pts

GP2 Cup

(key) (Main numbers indicate the rider's finishing position within the GP2 class, while superscript numbers indicate their overall finishing position in the combined British Supersport and GP2 race. Bold text indicates GP2 class pole position, and italics indicate the fastest lap within the GP2 class.)

Pos	Rider	Bike	SIL (England)		OUL (England)		DON (England)		KNO (Scotland)		SNE (England)		BRH (England)		THR (England)		CAD (England)		OUL (England)		DON (England)		BRH (England)		Pts
Pos	Rider	Bike	SR	FR	SR	FR	SR	FR	SR	FR	SR	FR	SR	FR	SR	FR	SR	FR	SR	FR	SR	FR	SR	FR	Pts
1	(England) Cameron Fraser	Chassis Factory	**2^{15}**	1**^{15}**	3**^{21}**	2**^{18}**	2**^{12}**	2**^{17}**	1**^{15}**	2**^{16}**	2**^{12}**	2**^{12}**	**3^{16}**	1**^{12}**	2**^{13}**	2**^{13}**	1**^{11}**	**2^{14}**	**1^{10}**	**1^{12}**	2**^{18}**	5**^{24}**	**2^{8}**	**1^{8}**	513
2	(Wales) Harry Rowlings	Chassis Factory	3**^{16}**	2**^{17}**	2**^{17}**	3**^{22}**	3**^{14}**	Ret	2**^{19}**	3**^{18}**	4**^{16}**	4**^{19}**	1**^{12}**	**2^{13}**	3**^{14}**	Ret	2**^{14}**	1**^{13}**	3**^{14}**	3**^{16}**	4**^{20}**	2**^{15}**	3**^{14}**	3**^{13}**	430
3	(England) Lucca Allen	Kalex	Ret	DNS			4**^{27}**	4**^{26}**	3**^{20}**	4**^{19}**	6**^{24}**	5**^{22}**	5**^{25}**	Ret	4**^{19}**	4**^{20}**	5**^{25}**	Ret	4**^{16}**	4**^{19}**	5**^{30}**	3**^{20}**	5**^{21}**	4**^{21}**	290
4	(England) Harvey Claridge	Chassis Factory					Ret	3**^{25}**			3**^{14}**	3**^{14}**	4**^{17}**	Ret	Ret	3**^{18}**	3**^{19}**	3**^{17}**	2**^{11}**	2**^{15}**	3**^{19}**	4**^{21}**	1**^{8}**	**2^{9}**	285
5	(England) Joe Collier	Krämer	1**^{12}**	**Ret**	**1^{9}**	**1^{12}**	**1^{8}**	**1^{10}**	**Ret**	**1^{11}**	**1^{10}**	**1^{11}**	2**^{14}**	Ret	**1^{10}**	**1^{9}**	**DNS**	DNS							272
6	(England) Luke Wallington	Triumph	DNS	3**^{28}**	DNS	Ret	5**^{31}**	Ret			5**^{19}**	Ret	Ret	3**^{26}**	5**^{31}**	5**^{26}**	4**^{24}**	5**^{24}**	5**^{23}**	Ret	6**^{36}**	7**^{29}**	7**^{29}**	6**^{27}**	218
7	(England) Jake Marsh	Triumph	DNS	DNS	DNS	DNS	DNS	DNS	Ret	DNS	Ret	6**^{26}**	6**^{28}**	Ret			7**^{27}**	Ret	Ret	5**^{30}**	DNS	6**^{26}**	6**^{26}**	Ret	90
8	(England) Barry Burrell	Krämer																			**1^{15}**	**1^{9}**	4**^{16}**	Ret	74
9	(England) Owen Mellor	Nykos															6**^{26}**	4**^{21}**	Ret	DNS			8**^{30}**	5**^{23}**	70
10	(England) Jodie Fieldhouse	Ariane	DNS	4**^{31}**							7**^{26}**	NS	DNS	DNS	6**^{34}**	6**^{29}**	DNS	DNS							58
Pos	Rider	Bike	SIL (England)		OUL (England)		DON (England)		KNO (Scotland)		SNE (England)		BRH (England)		THR (England)		CAD (England)		OUL (England)		DON (England)		BRH (England)		Pts
Pos	Rider	Bike	Source:																						Pts

Supersport Cup

(key) (Main numbers indicate the rider's finishing position within the SSC class, while superscript numbers indicate their overall finishing position in the combined British Supersport and SSC race. Bold text indicates SSC class pole position, and italics indicate the fastest lap within the SSC class.)

Pos	Rider	Bike	SIL (England)		OUL (England)		DON (England)		KNO (Scotland)		SNE (England)		BRH (England)		THR (England)		CAD (England)		OUL (England)		DON (England)		BRH (England)		Pts
Pos	Rider	Bike	SR	FR	SR	FR	SR	FR	SR	FR	SR	FR	SR	FR	SR	FR	SR	FR	SR	FR	SR	FR	SR	FR	Pts
1	(England) Tom Tunstall	Ducati			1**^{19}**	**1^{19}**	**1^{16}**	1**^{19}**			1**^{15}**	2**^{17}**	3**^{21}**	2**^{17}**	3**^{20}**	3**^{19}**			**1^{13}**	2**^{18}**	**2^{23}**	**1^{19}**	**1^{22}**	4**^{20}**	366
2	(England) Jonathan Railton	Ducati	DNS	DNS			5**^{22}**	Ret	2**^{18}**	2**^{20}**	**2^{17}**	1**^{15}**	**4^{22}**	1**^{15}**	1**^{15}**	**1^{14}**					**1^{22}**	3**^{23}**	3**^{24}**	1**^{16}**	290
3	(England) Ben Tolliday	Yamaha			4**^{24}**	4**^{24}**	Ret	4**^{23}**	3**^{21}**	3**^{21}**			5**^{23}**	5**^{23}**			**1^{17}**	**1^{16}**	4**^{19}**	6**^{26}**	6**^{31}**	4**^{27}**	DNS	DNS	240
4	(Scotland) Adon Davie	Ducati	5**^{23}**	3**^{21}**	DNS	DNS	4**^{19}**	Ret	**1^{13}**	**1^{12}**			2**^{18}**	Ret	2**^{18}**	2**^{15}**			Ret	1**^{17}**			4**^{25}**	3**^{19}**	233
5	(England) Ryan Garside	Yamaha	6**^{25}**	5**^{24}**	**Ret**	2**^{20}**	7**^{26}**	3**^{22}**	4**^{22}**	4**^{22}**	Ret	5**^{24}**	6**^{24}**	6**^{24}**	**6^{24}**	4**^{22}**	4**^{22}**	4**^{24}**							232
6	(England) Dave Grace	Yamaha			2**^{22}**	Ret	6**^{24}**	6**^{27}**					1**^{13}**	**Ret**	7**^{27}**	5**^{24}**	Ret	5**^{25}**	5**^{20}**	4**^{24}**	4**^{26}**	2**^{22}**	2**^{23}**	**5^{24}**	231
7	(England) Harry Leigh	Kawasaki	**1^{18}**	**1^{19}**	3**^{23}**	5**^{26}**	2**^{17}**	**2^{21}**			4**^{20}**	Ret	10**^{30}**	4**^{21}**							5**^{29}**	Ret			188
8	(England) Josh Wood	Yamaha	2**^{19}**	4**^{23}**			DNS	DNS			Ret	3**^{18}**	DNS	DNS			2**^{18}**	3**^{19}**	2**^{15}**	**3^{20}**	3**^{25}**	Ret	Ret	2**^{17}**	186
9	(England) James Bull	Yamaha	3**^{20}**	2**^{20}**	5**^{26}**	3**^{21}**	3**^{18}**	Ret			3**^{18}**	4**^{20}**	Ret	3**^{20}**	5**^{22}**	Ret									172
10	(England) Craig Kennelly	Ducati	7**^{28}**	7**^{26}**	6**^{29}**	6**^{27}**	8**^{28}**	Ret			Ret	Ret	7**^{26}**	9**^{29}**	8**^{28}**	6**^{25}**			Ret	8**^{29}**			6**^{28}**	6**^{26}**	144
11	(England) Ben Grayson	Kawasaki			7**^{31}**	Ret	DNS	DNS					9**^{29}**	8**^{28}**	10**^{30}**	Ret	Ret	6**^{26}**	3**^{18}**	7**^{27}**	9**^{34}**	7**^{31}**	Ret	7**^{28}**	114
12	(England) Harry Cook	MV Agusta	4**^{22}**	6**^{25}**			Ret	5**^{24}**			Ret	**Ret**	11**^{31}**	DNS	4**^{21}**	Ret			6**^{22}**	5**^{25}**	NS	DNS	7**^{31}**	Ret	113
13	(England) Caiden Wilkinson	Kawasaki					DNS	DNS					8**^{27}**	7**^{27}**			3**^{21}**	2**^{18}**			7**^{32}**	5**^{28}**			92
14	(England) Matt Stevens	Ducati			8**^{32}**	8**^{29}**	DNS	Ret			5**^{25}**	Ret	DNS	10**^{30}**	9**^{29}**	7**^{27}**					10**^{35}**	DNS	Ret	NS	68
15	(England) Lee Devonport	Ducati	8**^{31}**	Ret	Ret	DNS													7**^{25}**	Ret	8**^{33}**	6**^{30}**	5**^{27}**	Ret	62
16	(England) Gareth Cunningham	Yamaha			DNS	7**^{28}**	DNS	DNS					DNS	DNS											12
	(Northern Ireland) Mark Conlin	Yamaha	DNS	DNS			DNS	DNS																	0
Pos	Rider	Bike	SIL (England)		OUL (England)		DON (England)		KNO (Scotland)		SNE (England)		BRH (England)		THR (England)		CAD (England)		OUL (England)		DON (England)		BRH (England)		Pts
Pos	Rider	Bike	Source:																						Pts
