= Thomas Strudwick =

British motorcycle racer

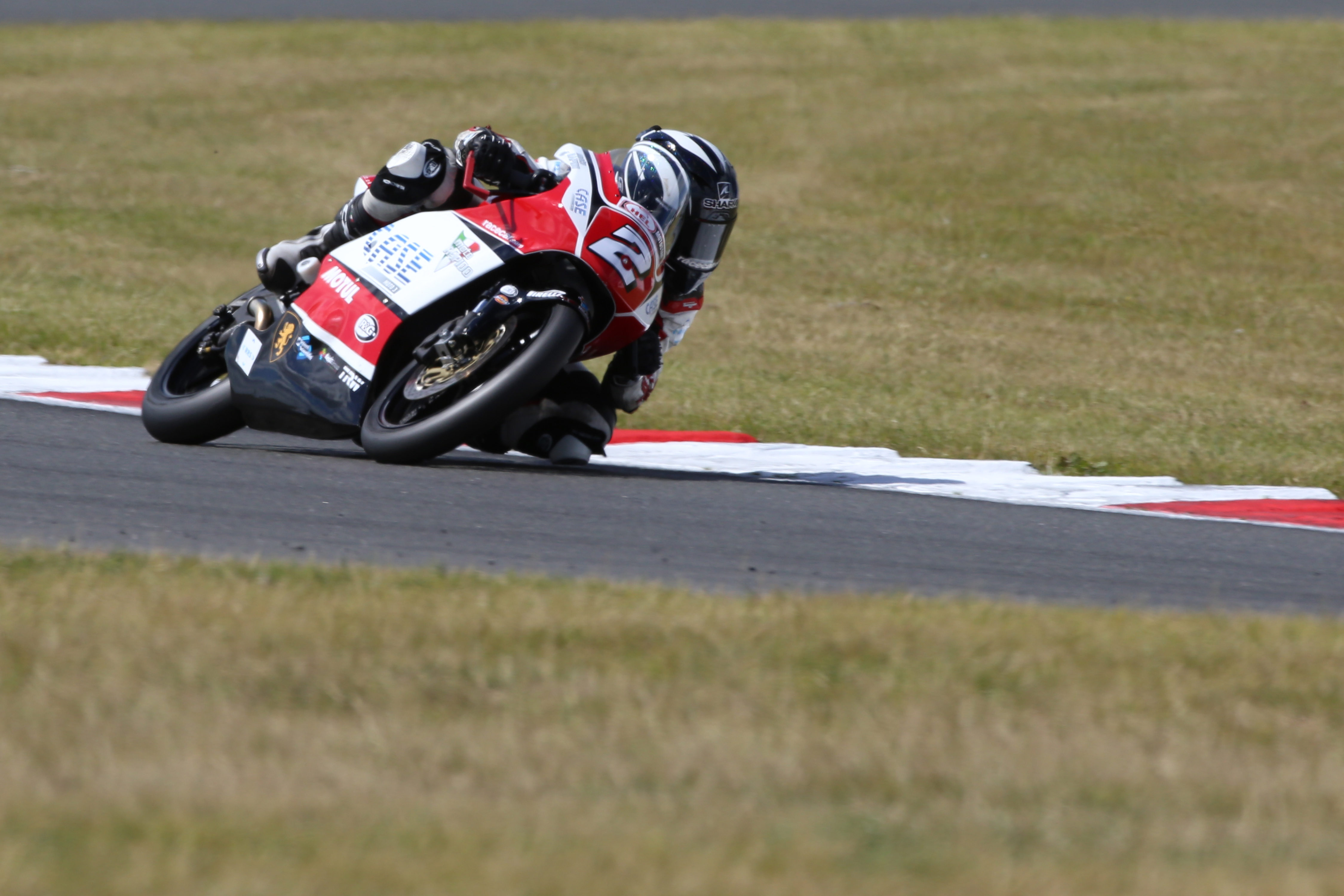
- Strudwick riding for the Moto Rapido Moto3 team at Snetterton in 2017
- Nationality: British
- Born: 17 October 2001 (age 25); West Sussex, England
- Current team: Case Moto BMW F900R and TS Racing Triumph 765
- Bike number: 25
- Website: Official website
Motorcycle racing career statistics
British Supersport Championship
Active years	2019 British GP2 class
Manufacturers	FTR Moto2
Championships	1
Starts / Wins / Podiums / Poles / F. laps / Points; 23 / 0 / 8 / 0 / 0 / 243

Thomas Strudwick (born 17 October 2001) is a British motorcycle road racer from West Sussex. During 2024, he raced in both the UK BMW F900 Cup national-level series winning the championship, and the inaugural National Sportbike Championship on a Triumph 765 where he finished third.

== Racing history ==
In 2015, Strudwick competed in the KTM British Junior Cup for MTS Racing. He became the youngest-ever winner of a British championship motorcycle race at the age of 13 years and 247 days on 21 June 2015, replacing the former accolade-holder Kyle Ryde.

Strudwick raced in the Moto3 Standard support class to the British Superbike Championship, where he achieved three wins finishing in third-place of the 2017 championship.

He was selected as one of 22 riders chosen to compete in the inaugural 2018 British Talent Cup, a controlled-formula series, and he also rode in the Motostar British Championship for superbike team Moto Rapido Moto3.

On 1 April 2018, Strudwick won the inaugural British Talent Cup race at Donington Park. The championship was conceived during 2017 by the MotoGP world championship organisers Dorna to promote young British riders.

More recently in 2019, Strudwick competed in the British Supersport Championship in the GP2 class, alongside the Case FTR Moto team.

In 2020, Strudwick raced in the Open600 class of the Campeonato de España de Superbike (ESBK) for the Team Edge RST Racing Team.

== Career statistics ==
Year	Class	Bike	Races	Pod	Pole	FLap	Pts	Position
2020	ESBK Open600	Yamaha R6	6	5	-	-	84	8th
2019	British Supersport Championship	FTR Moto2	23	8	-	-	243	5th
2018	British Talent Cup	Honda NSF250R Moto3	10	8	2	2	168	1st
2017	Hel Performance Motostar British Standard class	Honda Moto3	23	15	4	0	339	3rd
2016	Hel Performance Motostar British Standard class	Honda Moto3	19	3	0	1	219	6th
2015	Santander Consumer Finance KTM British Junior Cup	KTM RC390 Cup Bike	13	9	2	1	219	4th
2014	FAB-Racing British MiniGP70 Championship	Metrakit MiniGP70	23	21	-	-	444	1st
2013	FAB-Racing British MiniGP70 Championship	Metrakit MiniGP70	24	21	-	-	483	2nd
2012	FAB-Racing British MiniGP50 Championship	Metrakit MiniGP50	18	9	-	-	288	5th
2011	FAB-Racing Junior 4.2 Minimoto British Championship	Polini 4.2 MiniMoto	18	1	-	-	185	5th
2009	Ringwood Motocross Club Schoolboy Junior	KTM 50cc	-	-	-	-	-	14th
2008	Ringwood Motocross Club Schoolboy Junior	KTM 50cc	-	-	-	-	-	21st
2007	Ringwood Motocross Club Schoolboy Rookie	KTM 50cc	-	-	-	-	-	-
**Total**			**138**	**79**	**6**	**2**	**2177**	

=== British Supersport Championship ===
(key) (Races in bold indicate pole position; races in italics indicate fastest lap)

Year	Bike	1	2	3	4	5	6	7	8	9	10	11	12	13	14	15	16	17	18	19	20	21	22	Pos	Pts
2023	Yamaha	SLV	SLV	OPK	OPK	DPK	DPK	KNH	KNH	STN	STN	BRH	BRH	TXN	TXN	CPK; 13	CPK; 12	OPK; Ret	OPK; 11	DPK	DPK	BRH	BRH	28th	13

Records
Preceded by Kyle Ryde; 13 years, 332 days (2011 British 125 Championship season)	Youngest rider to win a British Championship Race; 13 years, 247 days (2015 British Superbike Championship season)	Succeeded by Storm Stacey
Preceded by Kyle Ryde; 13 years, 332 days (2011 British 125 Championship season)	Youngest novice rider to win a British Championship Race; 13 years, 247 days (2015 British Superbike Championship season)	Succeeded by Incumbent
