= Mike Edwards (motorcyclist) =

British motorcycle racer (born 1962)

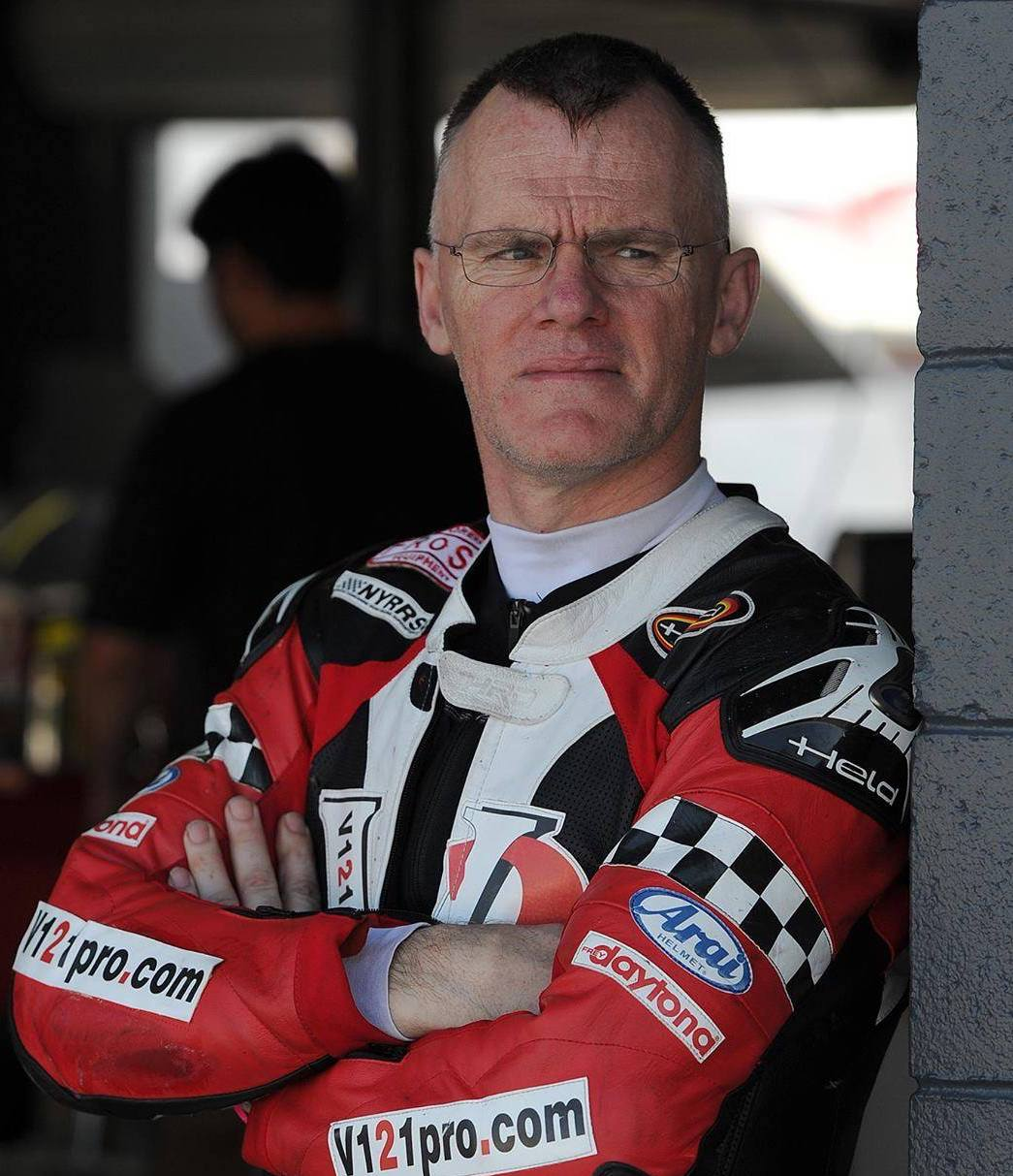
Edwards in 2019

Mike 'Spike' Edwards (born February 1962) is an English motorcycle road racer based in Nidderdale. He is a seven-time motorcycle champion in various classes.

Edwards has secured five World Endurance rostrums: Brno, Silverstone, Paul Ricard, Imola and Vallelunga. He has previously trained as a driving standards agency, compulsory basic training and direct access training instructor.

== Career highlights ==
- 1988 British JuniorStock Champion
- 1992 400cc British Supersport Championship
- 1995 600cc British Supersport Championship
- 2004 British Supermono Champion (watercooled)
- 2014 British Historic GP Champion
- 2015 British Historic GP Champion
- 2017 Euro FIM International Classic GP Champion
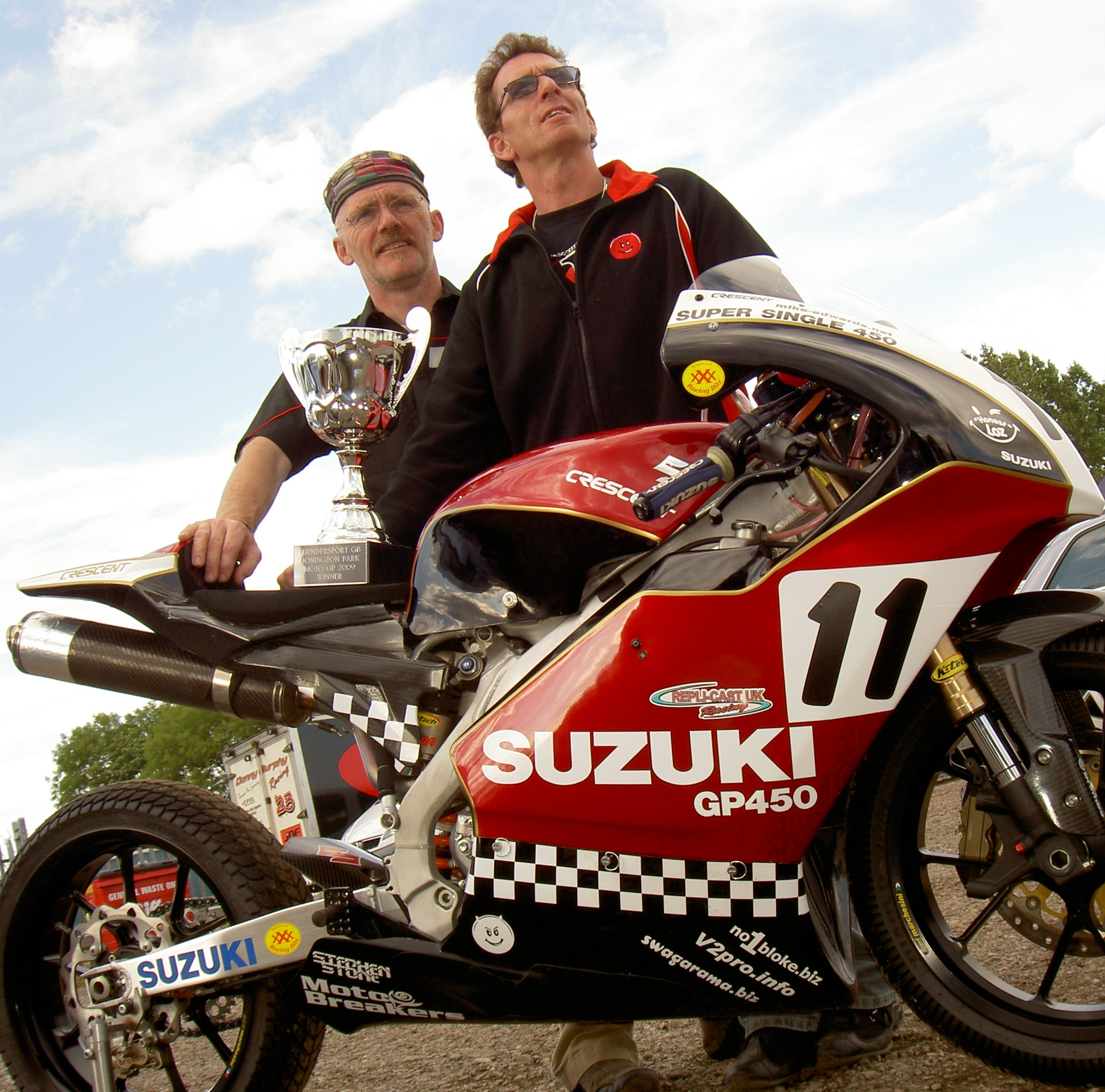
Edwards (left) and bike builder Mark Hanna

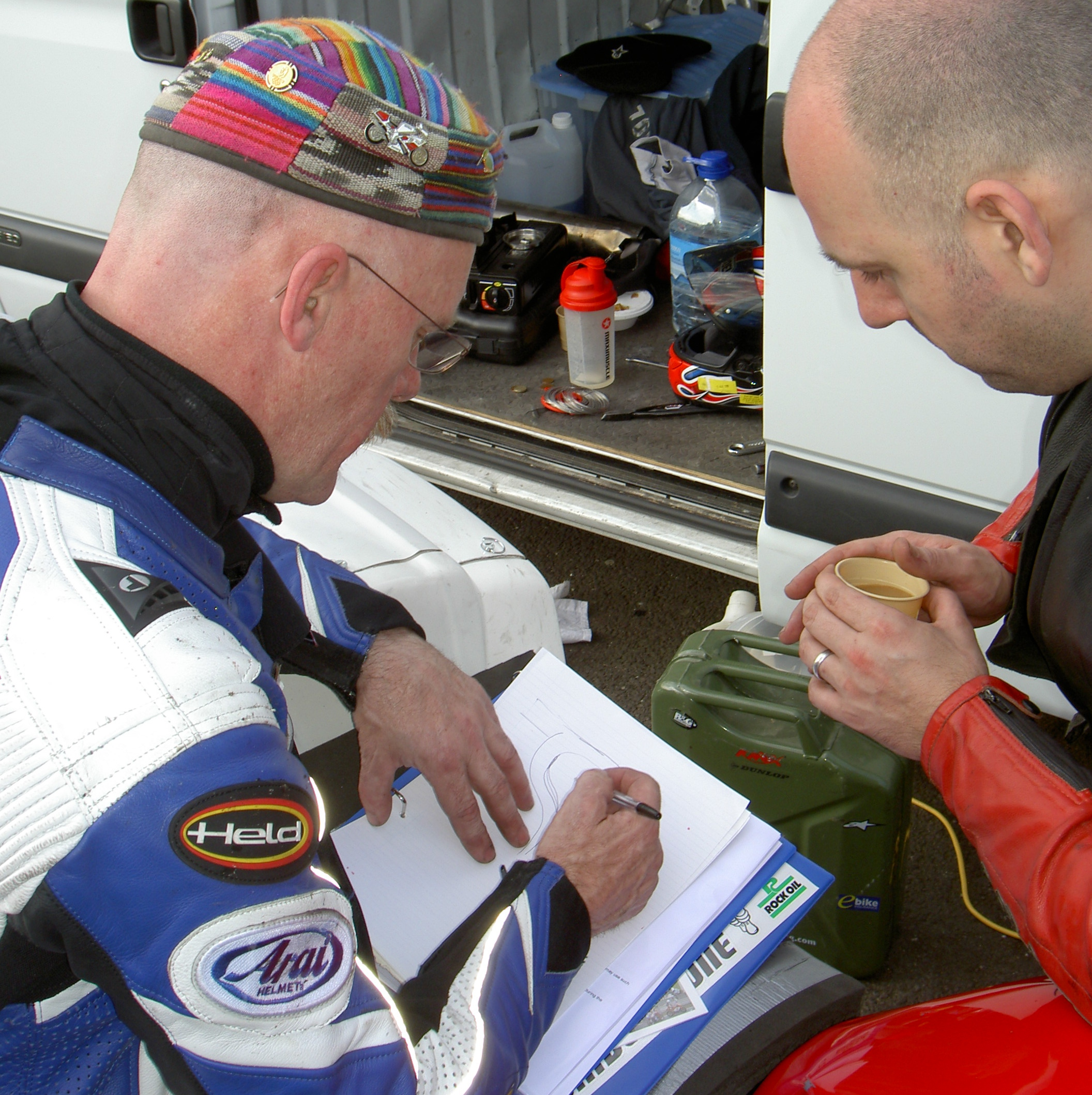
Edwards discusses circuit layout with one of his race coaching students

== Career statistics ==
=== FIM World Endurance Championship ===
==== By team ====
Year	Team	Bike	Rider	TC
2004	Yamaha Austria Racing Team	Yamaha YZF-R1	(Slovenia) Igor Jerman (Austria) Horst Saiger (Austria) Thomas Hinterreiter (United Kingdom) James Ellison (United Kingdom) Mike Edwards (United Kingdom) Gary Mason (Australia) Dean Thomas (France) Marc Garcia	4th

== Sources ==
Sporting positions
Preceded by Steve Hislop	Macau Motorcycle Grand Prix Winner; 1995	Succeeded by Phillip McCallen
