= 2022 British Supersport Championship =

Motorcycle race

The 2022 British Supersport Championship season was the 34th British Supersport Championship season, incorporating the 2022 British GP2 Cup. Jack Kennedy started the season as the reigning champion.

== Teams and riders ==
2022 Entry List
Team	Constructor	No.	Rider	Class	Rounds
Mar-Train Racing	Yamaha	1	(Republic of Ireland) Jack Kennedy		1–9
Appleyard Macadam Racing	Yamaha	4	(England) Harry Truelove		All
Appleyard Macadam Racing	Yamaha	97	(England) Bradley Perie		All
MD Racing	Yamaha	5	(Northern Ireland) Michael Dunlop		2
Associated British Motorcycles	ABM	5	(England) Mason Law	GP2	10–11
PWR	Yamaha	6	(England) Phil Wakefield		All
Krämer Factory Racing	Krämer	7	(England) Barry Burrell	GP2	2–11
Krämer Factory Racing	Krämer	58	(Austria) Lukas Wimmer	GP2	5, 7, 9–11
Krämer Factory Racing	Krämer	17	(England) Joe Collier	GP2	9, 11
Gearlink Kawasaki	Kawasaki	8	(England) Luke Stapleford		2–9, 11
Gearlink Kawasaki	Kawasaki	22	(Northern Ireland) Eunan McGlinchey		1
Gearlink Kawasaki	Kawasaki	45	(Northern Ireland) Scott Swann		5–11
Gearlink Kawasaki	Kawasaki	55	(England) Zak Corderoy		1–3
Gearlink Kawasaki	Kawasaki	96	(England) Tom Booth-Amos		10
Gearlink Kawasaki	Kawasaki	96	(England) Tom Booth-Amos		11
PW Gates Racing	Harris Performance	9	(England) Conor Wheeler	GP2	
Vandenhoy - Krämer	Krämer	10	(England) Simon Reid	GP2	1–3
DOT Racing	Kawasaki	11	(Isle of Man) Max Ingham		All
DOT Racing	Kawasaki	83	(England) Harris Beech		2–3
Motorcycle Race Parts Ducati	Ducati	12	(England) Tom Tunstall		10
Ashcourt Racing	Yamaha	13	(Northern Ireland) Lee Johnston		1–3, 5–6, 8–11
Ashcourt Racing	Yamaha	92	(New Zealand) Damon Rees		All
PHR Performance Triumph	Triumph	14	(Republic of Ireland) Brian McCormack		2, 10
Completely Motorbikes/Affinity	Kawasaki	15	(Republic of Ireland) Eugene McManus		All
Go Racing/SGR	Chassis Factory	16	(England) Harvey Claridge	GP2	All
Go Racing/SGR	Chassis Factory	17	(England) Carl Stevens	GP2	3
Go Racing/SGR	Chassis Factory	95	(England) Carl Stevens	GP2	11
Go Racing/SGR	Chassis Factory	57	(Northern Ireland) Korie McGreevy	GP2	4–7
Go Pink Racing	Ariane	18	(England) Jodie Fieldhouse	GP2	1–3, 5–7, 9–11
Tommo#21 Racing	Triumph	21	(England) Stephen Thomas		1–3, 5–6, 8, 10–11
McAdoo Kawasaki	Kawasaki	22	(Northern Ireland) Eunan McGlinchey		11
Enpro Kawasaki	Kawasaki	23	(England) Ben Grayson		3, 9
True Heroes Racing/Laguna Motorcycles Ducati	Ducati	14	(England) Charlie White		6
True Heroes Racing/Laguna Motorcycles Ducati	Ducati	24	(England) Charlie White		10
True Heroes Racing/Laguna Motorcycles Ducati	Ducati	55	(England) Leon Wilton		6, 10
D2R Yamaha	Yamaha	27	(England) Peter Wright		1–3, 7, 9
Astro JJR Triumph	Triumph	2	(England) Josh Day		1–3
Astro JJR Triumph	Triumph	5	(England) Mason Law		5–6
Astro JJR Triumph	Triumph	28	(New Zealand) Shane Richardson		1, 9–11
Astro JJR Triumph	Triumph	69	(Republic of Ireland) Rhys Irwin		All
Astro JJR Triumph	Triumph	77	(Australia) Tom Toparis		7–9
Carl Cox Motorsport with Uggly & Co by Binch Pro	Yamaha	30	(England) Max Cook		11
Marvel HCL Motorsport	Ducati	31	(England) Matt Bainbridge		10
Team Tolly by Motorcycle Sport Media	Yamaha	33	(England) Ben Tolliday		1–5, 7
JW Racing	Yamaha	35	(England) Josh Wood		3, 5, 7–8, 10–11
AH Performance/Breckland Utility Solutions	Ducati	36	(England) Ewan Potter		6
Team 151s	Ariane	37	(England) Charlie Morris	GP2	7, 11
AGR Motorsport	Triumph	38	(Isle of Man) Jamie Cringle		10
Donkey Box Racing	Yamaha	41	(England) Alan Naylor		2, 4–5
R&R Racing	Yamaha	44	(Republic of Ireland) Caolán Irwin		All
Quayside Racing Powered by Steampacket Co.	Honda	45	(Isle of Man) Nathan Harrison		2
BarneyRacing	Yamaha	46	(England) Ash Barnes		3–11
Synergy Racing	FTR Moto	47	(England) Jake Archer	GP2	All
Exersci Yamaha	Yamaha	56	(England) Tommy Fielding		1, 7
Team Xclusiv	Kawasaki	59	(England) Caiden Wilkinson		7
Munro Racing	Yamaha	64	(Scotland) Sam Munro		1–4
Go Racing/CFR	Chassis Factory	66	(England) Cameron Fraser	GP2	All
LS Joinery Yamaha	Yamaha	70	(England) Lee Wells		7
Peterpan Racing	Yamaha	71	(England) Dave Grace		11
Specialised Group / Valley Racing	Yamaha	72	(England) Max Wadsworth		1–4, 9–10
BER/ Steve Jordan Motorcycles	BER EVO	73	(Wales) Harry Rowlings	GP2	1–2, 4–11
MPM Routz Racing	Yamaha	74	(Netherlands) Jaimie van Sikkelerus		All
Ready4Racing Vision Team	Kawasaki	75	(England) Jamie Perrin		1–6
Jamie Perrin Racing	Yamaha	75	(England) Jamie Perrin		7, 9–11
BPE Yamaha by Russell Racing	Yamaha	77	(England) Richard Cooper		11
BPE Yamaha by Russell Racing	Yamaha	81	(England) Ian Hutchinson		2
PreZ Racing Yamaha	Yamaha	77	(Northern Ireland) Paul Jordan		1, 6
PreZ Racing Yamaha	Yamaha	22	(Northern Ireland) Paul Jordan		9
Highsparks Ducati	Ducati	82	(England) Luke Jones		All
Dragon Racing	Ducati	89	(Wales) David Jones		1–3, 9–10
ILR / Mark Coverdale Yamaha	Yamaha	93	(Republic of Ireland) Joseph Loughlin		2
Art of Racing	Ducati	96	(England) Peter Hasler		6
DAT Racing	Chassis Factory	98	(Netherlands) Tomás de Vries	GP2	1–3, 5–8, 10–11
Kovara Projects / RS Racing	Kalex	99	(England) Jack Scott	GP2	All

Key
Regular Rider
Wildcard Rider
Replacement rider
GP2 GP2 Cup

== Race calendar and results ==
2022 calendar
Round		Circuit	Date	Pole position	Fastest lap	Winning rider	Winning team
1	SR	(England) Silverstone National	16 April	(Republic of Ireland) Jack Kennedy	(Northern Ireland) Lee Johnston	(Republic of Ireland) Jack Kennedy	Mar-Train Racing
1	FR	(England) Silverstone National	17 April		(England) Bradley Perie	(Republic of Ireland) Jack Kennedy	Mar-Train Racing
2	SR	(England) Oulton Park	1 May	(Republic of Ireland) Jack Kennedy	(Northern Ireland) Lee Johnston	(Republic of Ireland) Jack Kennedy	Mar-Train Racing
2	FR	(England) Oulton Park	2 May		(Northern Ireland) Lee Johnston	(Republic of Ireland) Jack Kennedy	Mar-Train Racing
3	SR	(England) Donington Park National	21 May	(Republic of Ireland) Jack Kennedy	(England) Bradley Perie	(England) Bradley Perie	Appleyard Macadam Racing
3	FR	(England) Donington Park National	22 May		(Republic of Ireland) Jack Kennedy	(England) Bradley Perie	Appleyard Macadam Racing
4	SR	(Scotland) Knockhill	18 June	(Republic of Ireland) Jack Kennedy	(Republic of Ireland) Jack Kennedy	(Republic of Ireland) Jack Kennedy	Mar-Train Racing
4	FR	(Scotland) Knockhill	19 June		(Republic of Ireland) Jack Kennedy	(Republic of Ireland) Jack Kennedy	Mar-Train Racing
5	SR	(England) Brands Hatch GP	23 July	(Republic of Ireland) Jack Kennedy	(Republic of Ireland) Jack Kennedy	(Republic of Ireland) Jack Kennedy	Mar-Train Racing
5	FR	(England) Brands Hatch GP	24 July		(Republic of Ireland) Jack Kennedy	(Republic of Ireland) Jack Kennedy	Mar-Train Racing
6	SR	(England) Thruxton	13 August	(Republic of Ireland) Jack Kennedy	(England) Jack Scott	(England) Jack Scott	RS Racing
6	FR	(England) Thruxton	14 August		(Republic of Ireland) Jack Kennedy	(Republic of Ireland) Jack Kennedy	Mar-Train Racing
7	SR	(England) Cadwell Park	28 August	(Republic of Ireland) Jack Kennedy	(Republic of Ireland) Jack Kennedy	(England) Harry Truelove	Appleyard Macadam Racing
7	FR	(England) Cadwell Park	29 August		(Republic of Ireland) Jack Kennedy	(Republic of Ireland) Jack Kennedy	Mar-Train Racing
8	SR	(England) Snetterton 300	10 September	(Republic of Ireland) Jack Kennedy	(Republic of Ireland) Jack Kennedy	(Republic of Ireland) Jack Kennedy	Mar-Train Racing
8	FR	(England) Snetterton 300	11 September		(Republic of Ireland) Jack Kennedy	(Republic of Ireland) Jack Kennedy	Mar-Train Racing
9	SR	(England) Oulton Park	24 September	(Republic of Ireland) Jack Kennedy	(England) Luke Stapleford	(England) Bradley Perie	Appleyard Macadam Racing
9	FR	(England) Oulton Park	25 September		(Republic of Ireland) Jack Kennedy	(England) Bradley Perie	Appleyard Macadam Racing
10	SR	(England) Donington Park GP	1 October	(England) Tom Booth-Amos	(Northern Ireland) Lee Johnston	(England) Bradley Perie	Appleyard Macadam Racing
10	FR	(England) Donington Park GP	2 October		(Netherlands) Jaimie van Sikkelerus	(Netherlands) Jaimie van Sikkelerus	MPM Routz Racing
11	SR	(England) Brands Hatch GP	15 October	(England) Bradley Perie	(England) Harry Truelove	(England) Bradley Perie	Appleyard Macadam Racing
11	FR	(England) Brands Hatch GP	16 October		(Northern Ireland) Lee Johnston	(England) Bradley Perie	Appleyard Macadam Racing

== Championship standings ==
Scoring system

Points are awarded to the top fifteen finishers in the respective classes. A rider has to finish the race to earn points.

Position	**1st**	**2nd**	**3rd**	**4th**	**5th**	**6th**	**7th**	**8th**	**9th**	**10th**	**11th**	**12th**	**13th**	**14th**	**15th**
Points	25	20	16	13	11	10	9	8	7	6	5	4	3	2	1

Supersport Championship

Pos	Rider	Bike	SIL (England)		OUL (England)		DON (England)		KNO (Scotland)		BRH (England)		THR (England)		CAD (England)		SNE (England)		OUL (England)		DON (England)		BRH (England)		Pts
Pos	Rider	Bike	SR	FR	SR	FR	SR	FR	SR	FR	SR	FR	SR	FR	SR	FR	SR	FR	SR	FR	SR	FR	SR	FR	Pts
1	(Republic of Ireland) Jack Kennedy	Yamaha	**1**	1	**1**	1	**2**	2	**1**	**1**	**1**	**1**	**2**	1	**2**	**1**	**1**	**1**	**Ret**	3					401
2	(England) Bradley Perie	Yamaha	Ret	Ret	2	3	1	**1**	4	4	5	4	3	2	4	2	Ret	2	1	1	1	Ret	**1**	1	359
3	(England) Harry Truelove	Yamaha	3	3	4	4	3	3	3	5	2	3	6	7	1	Ret	4	Ret	2	Ret	6	2	Ret	**4**	275
4	(Northern Ireland) Lee Johnston	Yamaha	2	**2**	3	**2**	4	5	DNS	DNS	6	Ret	10	8			3	4	3	2	3	**3**	4	2	257
5	(Netherlands) Jaimie van Sikkelerus	Yamaha	4	4	9	7	13	9	8	8	12	11	15	14	Ret	3	2	3	8	5	2	1	5	4	229
6	(England) Luke Stapleford	Kawasaki			5	5	5	4	2	2	3	2	4	4	6	Ret	7	7	Ret	**Ret**			7	10	200
7	(Republic of Ireland) Rhys Irwin	Triumph	6	Ret	17	Ret	Ret	12	7	7	10	12	9	11	27	6	8	6	7	6	7	9	3	7	155
8	(Republic of Ireland) Eugene McManus	Kawasaki	Ret	Ret	7	Ret	9	6	10	3	Ret	7	5	6	5	Ret	10	9	10	8	9	6	13	12	153
9	(New Zealand) Damon Rees	Yamaha	Ret	9	18	12	12	7	11	12	8	9	Ret	17	10	4	12	8	6	7	8	10	6	8	145
10	(England) Luke Jones	Ducati	5	5	8	Ret	10	10	6	14	Ret	10	Ret	9	8	7	6	10	Ret	Ret	5	5	Ret	13	135
11	(England) Jamie Perrin	Kawasaki	Ret	Ret	10	Ret	8	Ret	5	10	11	Ret	7	5											124
11	(England) Jamie Perrin	Yamaha													8	5			4	4	Ret	8	10	Ret	124
12	(England) Ash Barnes	Yamaha					11	Ret	Ret	DNS	13	13	11	10	7	9	11	12	16	14	14	Ret	15	14	73
13	(Isle of Man) Max Ingham	Kawasaki	11	11	26	Ret	16	16	15	18	20	17	Ret	18	11	8	19	18	18	16	22	19	28	21	55
14	(Republic of Ireland) Caolán Irwin	Yamaha	Ret	12	13	13	14	13	DNS	DNS	DNS	18	18	Ret	20	12	18	16	15	19	13	12	17	Ret	55
15	(Northern Ireland) Scott Swann	Kawasaki									17	19	12	12	Ret	Ret	13	13	5	9	10	Ret	13	Ret	52
16	(England) Tom Booth-Amos	Kawasaki																			**4**	4	8	5	45
17	(England) Phil Wakefield	Yamaha	13	13	23	Ret	17	18	14	16	18	Ret	19	21	19	17	20	17	17	18	19	18	24	19	43
18	(Scotland) Sam Munro	Yamaha	Ret	Ret	11	8	7	11	DNS	9															37
19	(England) Richard Cooper	Yamaha																					2	3	36
20	(England) Mason Law	Triumph									7	6	8	13											34
21	(England) Josh Day	Triumph	10	7	15	11	DNS	DNS																	26
22	(Australia) Tom Toparis	Triumph													12	10	9	11	DNS	DNS					25
23	(New Zealand) Shane Richardson	Triumph	WD	WD															9	10	11	11	Ret	17	25
24	(England) Zak Corderoy	Kawasaki	14	Ret	6	6	Ret	DNS																	24
25	(England) Max Wadsworth	Yamaha	12	Ret	22	15	18	17											12	DNS	15	14	DNS	15	24
26	(Northern Ireland) Eunan McGlinchey	Kawasaki	7	6																			14	DNS	22
27	(England) Max Cook	Yamaha																					11	9	13
28	(England) Josh Wood	Yamaha					21	Ret			19	Ret			18	16	16	Ret			Ret	DNS	23	23	13
29	(England) Ian Hutchinson	Yamaha			16	9																			9
30	(England) Tommy Fielding	Yamaha	17	16											21	Ret									7
31	(Northern Ireland) Paul Jordan	Yamaha	16	17									21	23					22	Ret					7
32	(England) Ben Tolliday	Yamaha	Ret	DNS	29	23	26	23	18	20	Ret	DNS			24	20									6
33	(England) Stephen Thomas	Triumph	20	19	Ret	DNS	24	24			Ret	DNS	22	24			22	21			21	21	27	Ret	3
34	(England) Caiden Wilkinson	Kawasaki													23	19									2
35	(England) Alan Naylor	Yamaha			DNS	DNS			19	Ret	DNS	DNS													2
36	(Wales) David Jones	Ducati	Ret	Ret	21	16	DNS	DNS											25	Ret	23	23			2
37	(Isle of Man) Jamie Cringle	Triumph																			24	20			1
38	(Republic of Ireland) Joseph Loughlin	Yamaha			25	20																			1
39	(England) Peter Wright	Yamaha	Ret	21	31	25	27	26							26	23			DNS	DNS					1
	(Northern Ireland) Michael Dunlop	Yamaha			19	Ret																			0
	(Republic of Ireland) Brian McCormack	Triumph			Ret	21															25	Ret			0
	(England) Lee Wells	Yamaha													Ret	21									0
	(England) Peter Hasler	Ducati											25	28											0
	(England) Ewan Potter	Ducati											26	26											0
	(England) Matt Bainbridge	Ducati																			26	DNS			0
	(England) Charlie White	Ducati											27	27							27	Ret			0
	(England) Leon Wilton	Ducati											28	Ret							28	25			0
	(England) Dave Grace	Yamaha																					29	Ret	0
	(England) Harris Beech	Kawasaki			DNS	DNS	DNS	DNS																	0
	(Isle of Man) Nathan Harrison	Honda			DNS	DNS																			0
	(England) Tom Tunstall	Ducati																			DNS	DNS			0
Pos	Rider	Bike	SIL (England)		OUL (England)		DON (England)		KNO (Scotland)		BRH (England)		THR (England)		CAD (England)		SNE (England)		OUL (England)		DON (England)		BRH (England)		Pts

GP2 Cup

(key) (Main numbers indicate the rider's finishing position within the GP2 class, while superscript numbers indicate their overall finishing position in the combined British Supersport and GP2 race. Bold text indicates GP2 class pole position, and italics indicate the fastest lap within the GP2 class.)

Pos	Rider	Bike	SIL (England)		OUL (England)		DON (England)		KNO (Scotland)		BRH (England)		THR (England)		CAD (England)		SNE (England)		OUL (England)		DON (England)		BRH (England)		Pts
Pos	Rider	Bike	SR	FR	SR	FR	SR	FR	SR	FR	SR	FR	SR	FR	SR	FR	SR	FR	SR	FR	SR	FR	SR	FR	Pts
1	(England) Jack Scott	Kalex	**Ret**	1^{8}	1**^{12}**	**1^{10}**	**1^{6}**	**1^{8}**	DNS	2**^{11}**	**1^{4}**	**1^{5}**	**1^{1}**	**1^{3}**	**1^{3}**	**Ret**	1**^{5}**	**1^{5}**	**Ret**	**1^{11}**	**Ret**	1**^{7}**	**Ret**	**10^{28}**	376
2	(England) Cameron Fraser	Chassis Factory	1^{8}	**Ret**	**2^{14}**	2**^{14}**	Ret	2**^{14}**	2**^{12}**	3**^{13}**	DNS	6**^{20}**	3**^{15}**	2**^{15}**	2**^{13}**	1**^{11}**	**2^{14}**	Ret	3**^{14}**	4**^{15}**	3**^{17}**	4**^{17}**	3**^{19}**	4**^{20}**	321
3	(England) Harvey Claridge	Chassis Factory	2**^{9}**	2**^{10}**	3**^{20}**	3**^{17}**	2**^{15}**	3**^{15}**	5**^{17}**	Ret	3**^{14}**	3**^{14}**	6**^{20}**	5**^{20}**	5**^{16}**	4**^{15}**	3**^{15}**	2**^{14}**	1**^{11}**	3**^{13}**	1**^{12}**	Ret	Ret	3**^{18}**	315
4	(England) Jake Archer	FTR Moto	Ret	3**^{14}**	5**^{27}**	6**^{22}**	4**^{20}**	4**^{19}**	4**^{16}**	5**^{17}**	5**^{16}**	4**^{15}**	4**^{16}**	4**^{19}**	4**^{15}**	3**^{14}**	5**^{21}**	4**^{19}**	2**^{13}**	2**^{12}**	Ret	3**^{15}**	2**^{16}**	2**^{16}**	280
5	(Wales) Harry Rowlings	BER EVO	3**^{15}**	5**^{18}**	4**^{24}**	5**^{19}**	DNS	DNS	DNS	6**^{19}**	Ret	7**^{21}**	5**^{16}**	3**^{16}**	5**^{17}**	2**^{13}**	4**^{17}**	3**^{15}**	4**^{19}**	5**^{17}**	Ret	**4^{16}**	4**^{20}**	Ret	211
6	(Netherlands) Tomás de Vries	Chassis Factory	4**^{18}**	4**^{15}**	7**^{30}**	7**^{24}**	6**^{23}**	7**^{22}**			6**^{21}**	8**^{22}**	7**^{23}**	6**^{22}**	7**^{22}**	5**^{18}**	6**^{23}**	5**^{20}**			5**^{20}**	6**^{22}**	7**^{25}**	6**^{24}**	182
7	(England) Barry Burrell	Krämer			6**^{28}**	4**^{18}**	5**^{22}**	6**^{21}**	3**^{13}**	4**^{15}**	4**^{15}**	Ret	8**^{24}**	7**^{25}**	3**^{14}**	Ret	Ret	Ret	DNS	DNS	DNS	Ret	Ret	Ret	120
8	(England) Jodie Fieldhouse	Ariane	5**^{19}**	6**^{20}**	DNS	DNS	7**^{28}**	8**^{27}**			Ret	Ret	9**^{29}**	Ret	Ret	7**^{24}**			7**^{24}**	7**^{21}**	6**^{29}**	7**^{24}**	9**^{30}**	9**^{27}**	98
9	(Northern Ireland) Korie McGreevy	Chassis Factory							**1^{6}**	**1^{6}**	2**^{9}**	2**^{8}**	2**^{13}**	DNS											90
10	(England) Mason Law	ABM																			2**^{16}**	2**^{12}**	1**^{10}**	1**^{11}**	90
11	(England) Carl Stevens	Chassis Factory					3**^{19}**	5**^{20}**															8**^{26}**	7**^{25}**	44
12	(Austria) Lukas Wimmer	Krämer									Ret	5**^{16}**			DNS	Ret			6**^{21}**	Ret	4**^{18}**	Ret	6**^{23}**	Ret	44
13	(England) Joe Collier	Krämer																	5**^{20}**	6**^{20}**			5**^{21}**	5**^{22}**	43
14	(England) Charlie Morris	Ariane													8**^{25}**	6**^{22}**							10**^{31}**	8**^{26}**	32
	(England) Simon Reid	Krämer	DNS	DNS	DNS	DNS	DNS	DNS																	0
	(England) Conor Wheeler	Harris Performance	WD	WD																					0
Pos	Rider	Bike	SIL (England)		OUL (England)		DON (England)		KNO (Scotland)		BRH (England)		THR (England)		CAD (England)		SNE (England)		OUL (England)		DON (England)		BRH (England)		Pts
