= Tony Strudwick =

English football coach

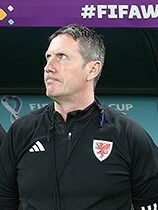
Strudwick with Wales at the 2022 FIFA World Cup

Tony Strudwick is an English football coach who currently works as Director of Medical for West Bromwich Albion and as head of performance for the Wales national team.

== Career ==
Strudwick has a PhD in sports science, which he earned from Liverpool John Moores University.

Strudwick began his football career as a player with Colchester United, but did not make a first team appearance for the club. He gave up playing soon after and moved into coaching. He had previously worked with Coventry City, West Ham United and The Football Association before becoming one of Mark Hughes' first appointments when he took over as manager of Blackburn Rovers in 2004. Strudwick was at Blackburn for three seasons, before Manchester United approached him as a replacement for their outgoing fitness coach, Valter Di Salvo, in the summer of 2007.

In April 2008, Strudwick was involved in an altercation between some of Manchester United's players, including Patrice Evra and Gary Neville, and the ground staff at Chelsea. During a warm-down led by Strudwick, it was claimed by Chelsea's head groundsman, Jason Griffin, that Strudwick had become abusive and foul-mouthed when asked not to warm down in the penalty area. Strudwick counter-claimed that Griffin had been less than polite in asking the players not to warm down in the penalty area, alleging that Griffin was "instantly aggressive" and that he had threatened him with a pitchfork. In April 2011, Strudwick reportedly damaged the wall of Manchester United's team dressing room at Wembley Stadium, following their 1–0 FA Cup semi-final loss to Manchester City, after kicking out in anger when the players came in from the defeat. The club was fined for the repairs.

In 2014, Strudwick joined the backroom staff of the England national football team for the 2014 FIFA World Cup in Brazil. Following the arrival of new manager Louis van Gaal at United, it was reported that Strudwick and United masseur Rod Thornley were pulled back from their England duties to focus solely on their work at United. In September 2014, the club confirmed Jos van Dijk succeeded Strudwick as Manchester United's first-team fitness coach. Strudwick was appointed as the club's "head of athletic development", and would oversee the club's youth fitness. In March 2018, Strudwick was appointed as head of performance of the Wales national team under manager Ryan Giggs; and joined at the end of the 2017–18 season.

Strudwick joined Steve Bruce at Sheffield Wednesday as the club's head of Sport Science and Medicine in the summer of 2019. In May 2021, he joined Arsenal as academy head of sports science and medicine. A year later, he moved to West Bromwich Albion.
