= Snetterton =

Village in Norfolk, England

Coordinates: 52.4808°N 0.9357°E

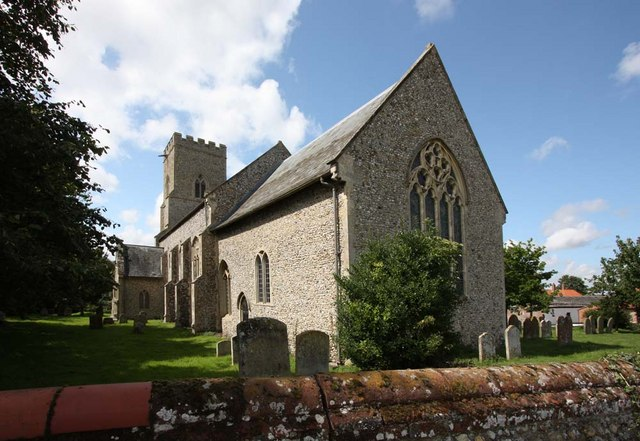
- All Saints' parish church

- Location within Norfolk
- Area: 28.03 km^{2} (10.82 sq mi)
- Population: 201 (2011 Census)
  - Density: 7/km^{2} (18/sq mi)
- OS grid reference: TL994910
- Civil parish: Snetterton
- District: Breckland
- Shire county: Norfolk
- Region: East
- Country: England
- Sovereign state: United Kingdom
- Post town: NORWICH
- Postcode district: NR16
- Dialling code: 01953
- Police: Norfolk
- Fire: Norfolk
- Ambulance: East of England
- UK Parliament: South West Norfolk
- Website: Snetterton Parish Council

Snetterton is a village and civil parish in Norfolk, England. The village is about 9 miles (14 km) east-northeast of Thetford and 19 miles (31 km) southwest of Norwich. The civil parish has an area of 8.94 km^{2} (3.45 sq mi). The 2011 Census recorded a parish population of 201 people living in 74 households.

The parish is in Breckland District.

== History ==
The earliest known surviving record of the place-name is in the Domesday Book of 1086, which records it as Snentretuna. It is derived from Old English, meaning "Snytra's enclosure".

The earliest part of the Church of England parish church of All Saints is the 13th-century chancel, which has a double piscina. The west tower is 14th-century, as is the bowl of the baptismal font. In the 15th century the nave was rebuilt and the north aisle and south porch were built.

The north porch was added in the 19th century. The church was restored in 1852, when the nave and chancel roofs were rebuilt and a Gothic Revival chancel screen was installed. All Saints' is a Grade I listed building.

Snetterton Motor Racing Circuit, formerly RAF Snetterton Heath, is partly in the parish and partly in the adjoining civil parish of Quidenham.
